= Thomas M. Hess House =

Historic house in Arkansas, United States

- U.S. National Register of Historic Places
- Location within Arkansas Location within the United States
- Location: Off AR 14, Marcella, Arkansas
- Coordinates: 35°47′24″N 91°52′45″W
- Area: less than one acre
- Built: 1868
- Architectural style: Queen Anne
- MPS: Stone County MRA
- NRHP reference No.: 85002226
- Added to NRHP: September 17, 1985

The Thomas M. Hess House is a historic house on Partee Drive in Marcella, Arkansas. It is a 1 1/2-story wood-frame structure, set facing east in a wooded area. It has a side-gable roof, with a cross-gabled ell extending west from the southern end. Its front facade is distinguished by a Queen Anne porch, supported by four decoratively-cut columns and a jigsawn balustrade. The house was built in 1868, and is the oldest known central-hall plan house in Stone County.

The house was listed on the National Register of Historic Places in 1985.

== See also ==
- Thomas E. Hess House
- National Register of Historic Places listings in Stone County, Arkansas
