= Bonds House =

Bonds House can refer to:

- Bonds House (Fox, Arkansas), listed on the National Register of Historic Places (NRHP) in Stone County, Arkansas
- Bonds House (Humboldt, Tennessee), listed on the NRHP in Gibson County, Tennessee
