= National Register of Historic Places listings in Stone County, Arkansas =

Location of Stone County in Arkansas

This is a list of the National Register of Historic Places listings in Stone County, Arkansas.

This is intended to be a complete list of the properties and districts on the National Register of Historic Places in Stone County, Arkansas, United States. The locations of National Register properties and districts for which the latitude and longitude coordinates are included below, may be seen in a map.

There are 57 properties and districts listed on the National Register in the county.

Contents: Counties in Arkansas
- Arkansas
- Ashley
- Baxter
- Benton
- Boone
- Bradley
- Calhoun
- Carroll
- Chicot
- Clark
- Clay
- Cleburne
- Cleveland
- Columbia
- Conway
- Craighead
- Crawford
- Crittenden
- Cross
- Dallas
- Desha
- Drew
- Faulkner
- Franklin
- Fulton
- Garland
- Grant
- Greene
- Hempstead
- Hot Spring
- Howard
- Independence
- Izard
- Jackson
- Jefferson
- Johnson
- Lafayette
- Lawrence
- Lee
- Lincoln
- Little River
- Logan
- Lonoke
- Madison
- Marion
- Miller
- Mississippi
- Monroe
- Montgomery
- Nevada
- Newton
- Ouachita
- Perry
- Phillips
- Pike
- Poinsett
- Polk
- Pope
- Prairie
- Pulaski (Little Rock)
- Randolph
- St. Francis
- Saline
- Scott
- Searcy
- Sebastian
- Sevier
- Sharp
- Stone
- Union
- Van Buren
- Washington
- White
- Woodruff
- Yell

This National Park Service list is complete through NPS recent listings posted May 1, 2026.

== Current listings ==
	Name on the Register	Image	Date listed	Location	City or town	Description
1	Jessie Abernathy House	Jessie Abernathy House	September 17, 1985 (#85002216)	Off Highway 14; 35°47′16″N 91°52′55″W	Marcella	
2	Alco School	Alco School	September 4, 1992 (#92001125)	Just north of Highway 66; 35°53′28″N 92°22′21″W	Alco	
3	Clarence Anderson Barn	Clarence Anderson Barn	September 17, 1985 (#85002217)	Highway 66; 35°53′20″N 92°15′03″W	Newnata	
4	George Anderson House		September 17, 1985 (#85002218)	West of Big Springs; 35°54′03″N 92°16′56″W	Big Springs	
5	John Avey Barn	John Avey Barn	September 17, 1985 (#85002219)	Off Highway 66; 35°53′56″N 92°16′03″W	Big Springs	
6	John Bettis House	John Bettis House	September 17, 1985 (#85002220)	Highway 14; 35°48′53″N 91°54′18″W	Pleasant Grove	
7	Bluff Springs Church and School	Bluff Springs Church and School	September 17, 1985 (#85002210)	3.5 miles west of Onia; 35°55′29″N 92°23′41″W	Onia	
8	Bonds House		February 3, 1992 (#91000691)	County Road 2 east of Meadow Creek; 35°46′17″N 92°20′43″W	Fox	
9	Brewer's Mill	Brewer's Mill	September 17, 1985 (#85002221)	Highway 66; 35°52′05″N 92°07′15″W	Mountain View	
10	A.B. Brewer Building	A.B. Brewer Building	October 25, 1985 (#85003395)	Highway 66; 35°52′06″N 92°07′06″W	Mountain View	
11	John F. Brewer House	John F. Brewer House	October 25, 1985 (#85003398)	Highway 9; 35°52′03″N 92°07′06″W	Mountain View	
12	Samuel Brown House	Samuel Brown House	September 17, 1985 (#85002204)	Off Highway 9; 35°49′49″N 92°08′39″W	West Richwoods	
13	C.B. Case Motor Co. Building	C.B. Case Motor Co. Building	September 17, 1985 (#85002222)	103 E Main St; 35°52′08″N 92°07′08″W	Mountain View	
14	Clark-King House	Clark-King House	September 17, 1985 (#85002234)	Northeast of Mountain View; 35°53′04″N 92°07′32″W	Mountain View	
15	Commercial Hotel	Commercial Hotel	September 17, 1985 (#85002223)	100 W Washington St; 35°52′10″N 92°07′03″W	Mountain View	
16	Henry Copeland House	Henry Copeland House	September 17, 1985 (#85002224)	Highway 14; 35°48′56″N 91°54′29″W	Pleasant Grove	
17	Wesley Copeland House		September 17, 1985 (#85002208)	Southeast of Timbo; 35°51′11″N 92°18′25″W	Timbo	
18	Davis Barn		September 17, 1985 (#85002225)	West of Pleasant Grove; 35°48′43″N 91°55′40″W	Pleasant Grove	
19	Dew Drop Inn	Dew Drop Inn	September 17, 1985 (#85002231)	307 W. Washington St. 35°52′10″N 92°07′13″W	Mountain View	
20	William Dillard Homestead	William Dillard Homestead	September 17, 1985 (#85002214)	Near the White River; 35°56′00″N 92°02′04″W	Round Bottom	
21	H.J. Doughtery House		September 17, 1985 (#85002232)	Highway 14; 35°47′31″N 91°53′03″W	Marcella	
22	Farmers and Merchants Bank	Farmers and Merchants Bank	September 17, 1985 (#85002228)	Highway 66; 35°52′07″N 92°07′02″W	Mountain View	
23	Zachariah Ford House	Zachariah Ford House	September 17, 1985 (#85002206)	Near the White River; 35°51′07″N 91°52′04″W	Pleasant Grove	
24	Fox Pictograph		May 4, 1982 (#82002143)	Address Restricted	Fox	
25	Orvall Gammill Barn	Orvall Gammill Barn	September 17, 1985 (#85002229)	Northwest of Big Springs; 35°54′36″N 92°16′25″W	Big Springs	
26	Walter Gray House	Walter Gray House	September 17, 1985 (#85002212)	Off Highway 14; 35°44′20″N 91°51′04″W	Melrose	
27	Joe Guffey House		September 17, 1985 (#85002211)	Highway 110; 35°43′12″N 92°24′34″W	Old Lexington	No longer standing
28	Binks Hess House and Barn		September 17, 1985 (#85002227)	Off Highway 14; 35°47′20″N 91°52′53″W	Marcella	
29	Thomas E. Hess House	Thomas E. Hess House	December 27, 1983 (#83003548)	Highway 14; 35°47′19″N 91°53′05″W	Marcella	
30	Thomas M. Hess House		September 17, 1985 (#85002226)	Off Highway 14; 35°47′24″N 91°52′45″W	Marcella	
31	Miles Jeffery Barn		September 17, 1985 (#85002215)	Off Highway 5; 35°59′11″N 92°07′21″W	Optimus	
32	Lackey General Merchandise and Warehouse	Lackey General Merchandise and Warehouse	September 17, 1985 (#85002233)	Highway 66; 35°52′07″N 92°07′03″W	Mountain View	
33	George W. Lackey House	George W. Lackey House	October 2, 1990 (#90000992)	Junction of King and Washington Sts. 35°52′10″N 92°07′07″W	Mountain View	
34	Albert and Almeda Lancaster House		September 7, 2021 (#100006931)	306 East Main St. 35°52′02″N 92°06′52″W	Mountain View	
35	Fred Lancaster Barn	Fred Lancaster Barn	September 17, 1985 (#85002213)	Near the White River; 35°56′19″N 92°02′45″W	Round Bottom	
36	Luber School	Luber School	September 4, 1992 (#92001124)	County Road 214; 35°46′11″N 92°05′15″W	Luber	
37	H.S. Mabry Barn	H.S. Mabry Barn	September 17, 1985 (#85002236)	Near Johnson Creek; 35°49′11″N 92°06′53″W	East Richwoods	
38	Marcella Church & School	Marcella Church & School	September 17, 1985 (#85002237)	Highway 14; 35°47′16″N 91°53′03″W	Marcella	
39	Owen Martin House	Owen Martin House	October 25, 1985 (#85003397)	Highway 14; 35°47′14″N 91°53′07″W	Marcella	
40	Noah McCarn House		September 17, 1985 (#85002238)	Highway 5; 35°49′16″N 92°02′27″W	Mountain View	Demolished in 2010
41	Mirror Lake Historic District	Mirror Lake Historic District	September 11, 1995 (#94001614)	Forest Service Road 1110E; 35°57′37″N 92°10′26″W	Ozark National Forest	
42	Jim Morris Barn		September 17, 1985 (#85002209)	Highway 66; 35°52′07″N 92°18′40″W	Timbo	
43	Mountain View Waterworks	Mountain View Waterworks	October 5, 2006 (#06000906)	Junction of Clarence St. and King St. 35°52′22″N 92°07′10″W	Mountain View	
44	Newton Sutterfield Farmstead	Newton Sutterfield Farmstead	May 20, 2003 (#03000398)	1797 Horton Hill Rd. 35°54′44″N 92°23′29″W	Alco	
45	Noricks Chapel School	Noricks Chapel School	June 4, 1998 (#98000615)	Meisenheimer Rd., 10 miles southeast of Mountain View; 35°47′08″N 92°01′12″W	Mountain View	
46	North Sylamore Creek Bridge		February 24, 2010 (#10000034)	Forest Service Road 1102 over N. Sylamore Creek; 35°59′44″N 92°12′46″W	Ozark National Forest	
47	Pictograph Cave		May 4, 1982 (#82002144)	Address Restricted	Mountain View	
48	Pinky Pruitt Barn	Pinky Pruitt Barn	September 17, 1985 (#85002239)	Highway 14; 35°50′17″N 91°56′07″W	St. James	
49	Roasting Ear Church and School	Roasting Ear Church and School	September 17, 1985 (#85002230)	Northeast of Onia; 35°56′51″N 92°17′20″W	Onia	
50	C.L. Smith & Son General Store	C.L. Smith & Son General Store	September 17, 1985 (#85002240)	Highway 66; 35°52′06″N 92°07′05″W	Mountain View	
51	Stegall General Store	Stegall General Store	September 17, 1985 (#85002241)	104 W. Main St. 35°52′06″N 92°07′05″W	Mountain View	
52	Stone County Courthouse	Stone County Courthouse	September 29, 1976 (#76000470)	Courthouse Sq. 35°52′08″N 92°07′05″W	Mountain View	
53	Sugarloaf Fire Tower Historic District		September 11, 1995 (#94001615)	Forest Service Road 1123; 36°05′02″N 92°09′48″W	Ozark National Forest	
54	Sylamore Creek Bridge	Sylamore Creek Bridge	November 18, 1999 (#99001353)	County Road 283 over Sylamore Creek; 35°56′09″N 92°07′18″W	Allison	
55	Taylor-Stokes House		September 17, 1985 (#85002207)	Off Highway 14; 35°45′36″N 91°51′57″W	Marcella	
56	Turkey Creek School	Turkey Creek School	October 25, 1985 (#85003396)	Highway 9; 35°45′31″N 92°13′54″W	Turkey Creek	
57	West Richwoods Church & School	West Richwoods Church & School	September 17, 1985 (#85002205)	Highway 9; 35°49′35″N 92°10′19″W	West Richwoods	

== Former listings ==
	Name on the Register	Image	Date listed	Date removed	Location	City or town	Description
1	John L. Lancaster House		September 17, 1985 (#85002235)	May 27, 2014	Off AR 66	Mountain View	Part of the Stone County MRA
2	Stone County Recorder Building		September 17, 1985 (#85002242)	May 27, 2014	Off AR 66	Mountain View	Part of the Stone County MRA

== See also ==
- List of National Historic Landmarks in Arkansas
- National Register of Historic Places listings in Arkansas
