= George W. Lackey House =

Historic house in Arkansas, United States

- U.S. National Register of Historic Places
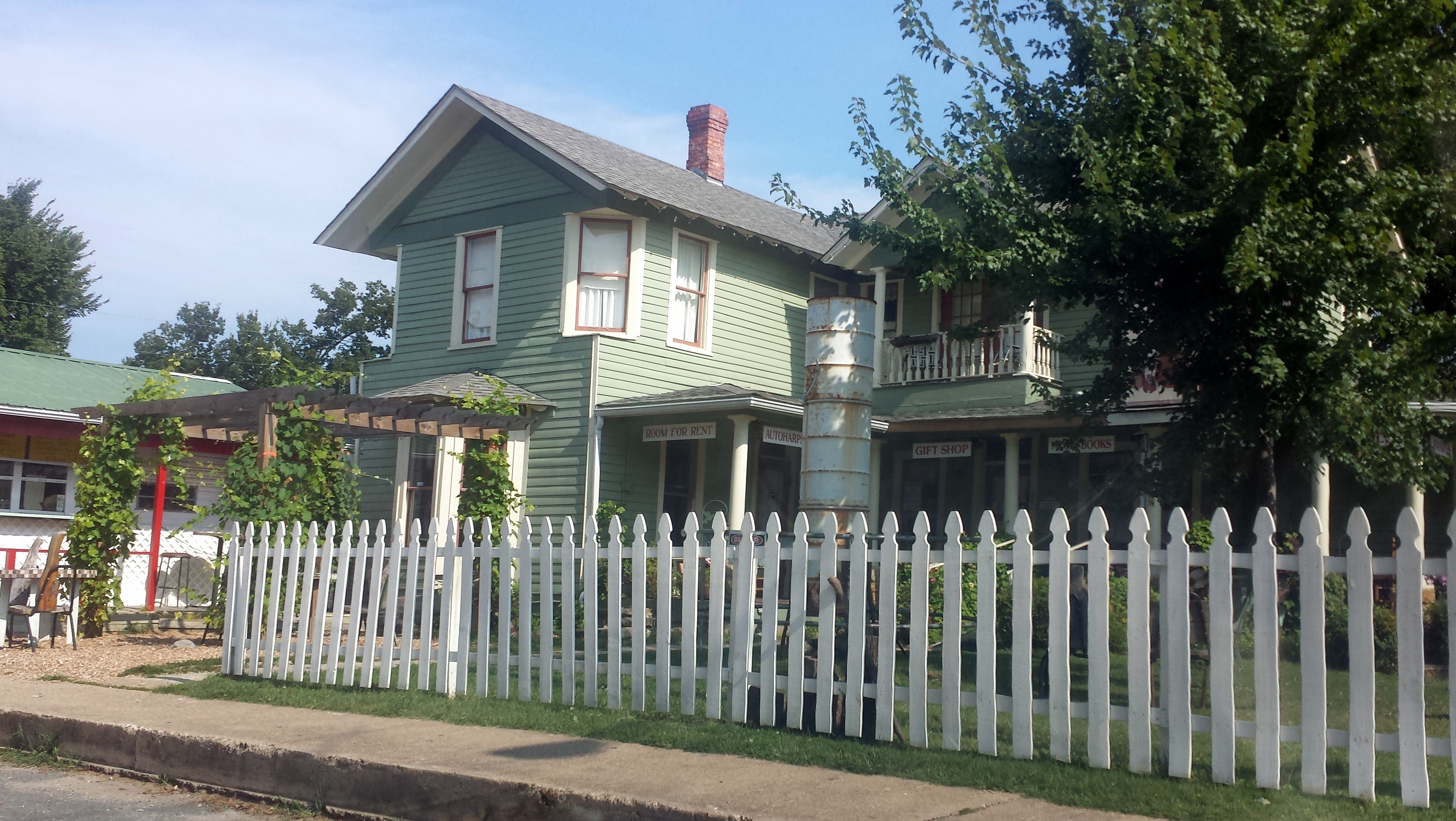

- Location within Arkansas Location within the United States
- Location: Jct. of King and Washington Sts., Mountain View, Arkansas
- Coordinates: 35°52′10″N 92°7′7″W
- Area: less than one acre
- Built: 1915
- Built by: Albert Copeland (1925 addition)
- Architectural style: Vernacular Craftsman
- MPS: Stone County MRA
- NRHP reference No.: 90000992
- Added to NRHP: October 2, 1990

The George W. Lackey House is a historic house at 124 Washington Street in Mountain View, Arkansas. It is a two-story wood-frame structure, finished in weatherboard siding. It has an L-shaped plan with a cross-gabled roof, and a porch that wraps around the south and east sides in the crook of the L. The eaves of the roof have exposed rafter ends in the Craftsman style. The house was built in 1915 by George Lackey, who came to Mountain View c. in 1901 as a teacher and eventually principal of the Stone County Academy. He later served several terms as mayor of Mountain View, and also operated the Lackey General Store.

The house was listed on the National Register of Historic Places in 1990.

== See also ==
- National Register of Historic Places listings in Stone County, Arkansas
