= Taylor-Stokes House =

Historic house in Arkansas, United States

- U.S. National Register of Historic Places
- Location within Arkansas Location within the United States
- Nearest city: Marcella, Arkansas
- Coordinates: 35°45′36″N 91°51′57″W
- Area: less than one acre
- Built: 1876
- Architect: Taylor & Stokes
- Architectural style: Log Saddle Bag
- MPS: Stone County MRA
- NRHP reference No.: 85002207
- Added to NRHP: September 17, 1985

The Taylor-Stokes House is a historic log house in rural southeastern Stone County, Arkansas. It is located off County Road 37, about 0.5 miles (0.80 km) west of Arkansas Highway 14, south of Marcella. It is a saddle-bag log structure, with two log pens on either side of a central chimney. A gable roof covers the pens and extends over porches on either side of the pens. The log structure is sheathed in weatherboard. Built in 1876, it is one of the oldest known log structures in Stone County, and the only one that is a saddle-bag variety.

The house was listed on the National Register of Historic Places in 1985.

== See also ==
- National Register of Historic Places listings in Stone County, Arkansas
