= Jessie Abernathy House =

Historic house in Arkansas, United States

- U.S. National Register of Historic Places
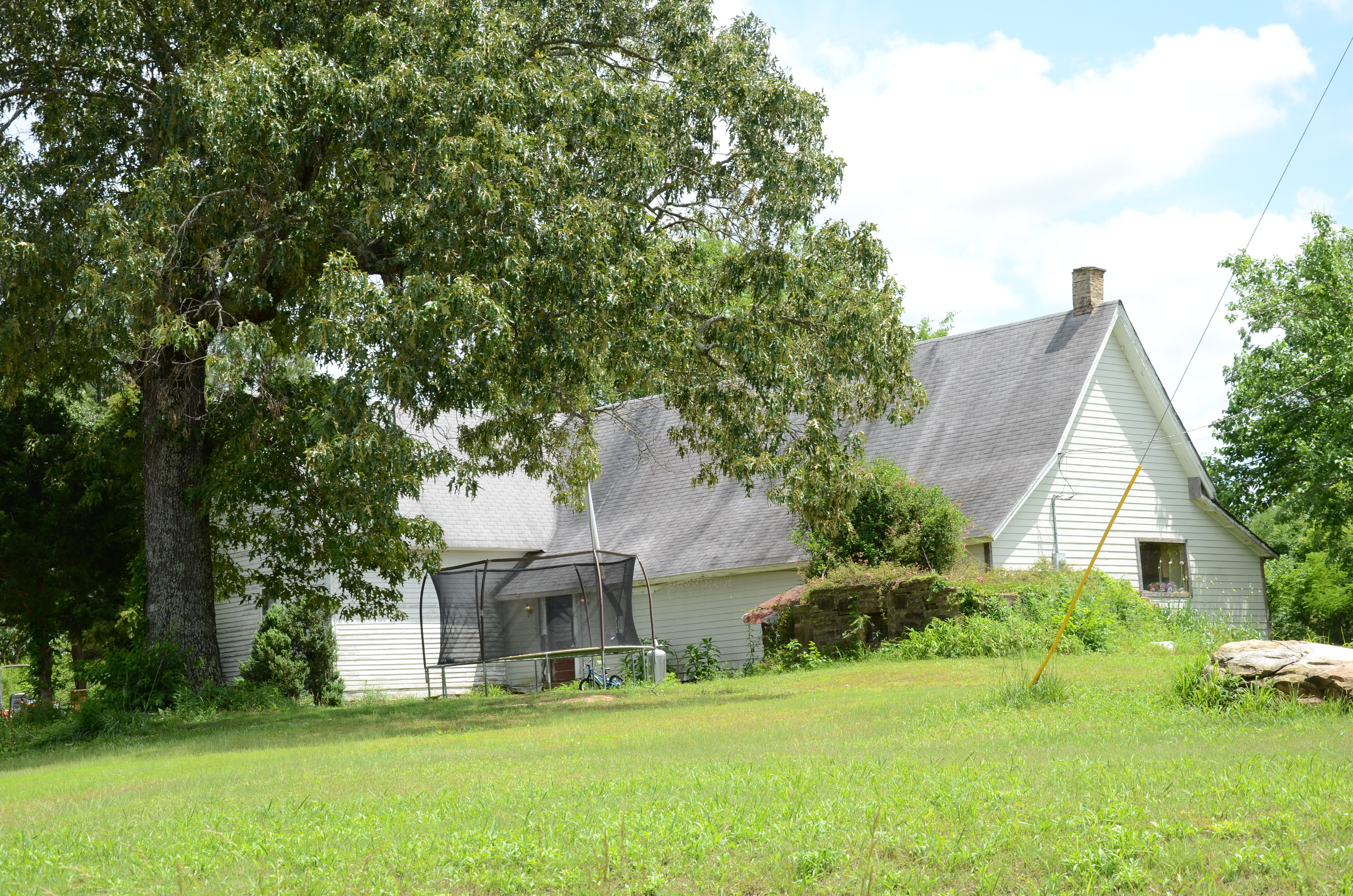
- The front elevation faces into the wooded area behind, and is not visible without walking onto the property.

- Location within Arkansas Location within the United States
- Location: Off AR 14, Marcella, Arkansas
- Coordinates: 35°47′16″N 91°52′55″W
- Area: less than one acre
- Built: 1884
- Architectural style: Central Hall plan
- MPS: Stone County MRA
- NRHP reference No.: 85002216
- Added to NRHP: September 17, 1985

The Jessie Abernathy House is a historic house located south of Partee Drive, just east of Arkansas Highway 14 in the hamlet of Marcella, Stone County, Arkansas.

== Description and history ==
The 1 1/2-story timber-framed structure is five bays wide, and has a side gable roof and rear ell. The front entry is sheltered by a hip-roof porch supported by turned columns. Built in 1884, it is a local example of vernacular late Victorian architecture in a rural setting, as well as central hall plan architecture.

The house was listed on the National Register of Historic Places on September 17, 1985.

== See also ==
- National Register of Historic Places listings in Stone County, Arkansas
