= Farmers and Merchants Bank (Mountain View, Arkansas) =

- U.S. National Register of Historic Places
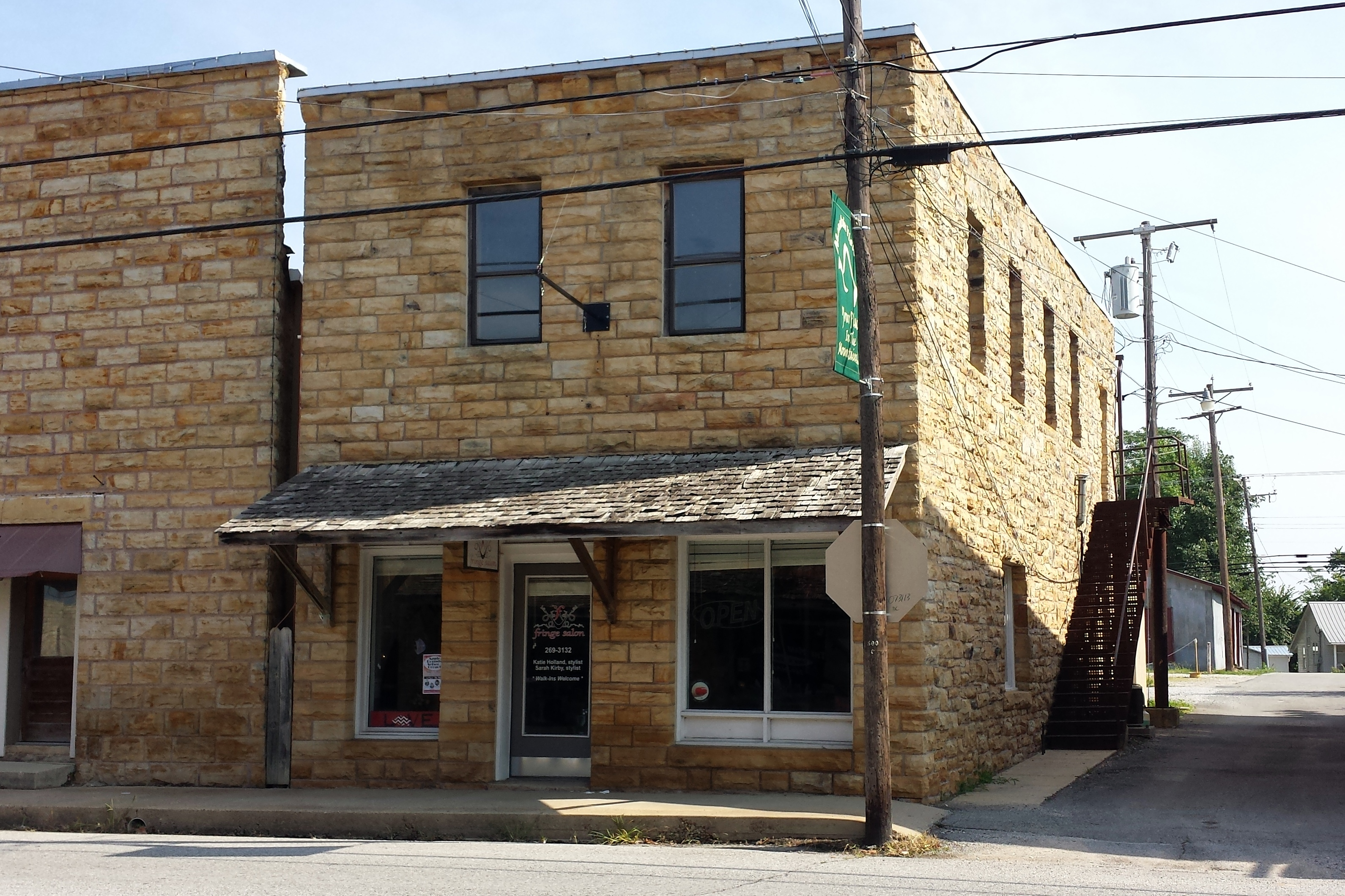

- Location within Arkansas Location within the United States
- Location: AR 66, Mountain View, Arkansas
- Coordinates: 35°52′7″N 92°7′2″W
- Area: less than one acre
- Built: 1910
- Built by: Bill Laroe
- Architectural style: Romanesquee
- MPS: Stone County MRA
- NRHP reference No.: 85002228
- Added to NRHP: September 17, 1985

The Farmers and Merchants Bank is a historic commercial building on Main Street, facing the courthouse square, in Mountain View, Arkansas, United States. It is a two-story stone structure, with a flat roof obscured by a parapet. Built out of rusticated stone, it has vernacular Romanesque styling in its rounded window and door openings on the first floor, and its crenellations at the top of the parapet. It was built in 1910, during the city's first major period of stone construction, by Bill Laroe, who also built the Stone County Courthouse.

The building was listed on the National Register of Historic Places in 1985.

== See also ==
- National Register of Historic Places listings in Stone County, Arkansas
