= John F. Brewer House =

Historic house in Arkansas, United States

- U.S. National Register of Historic Places
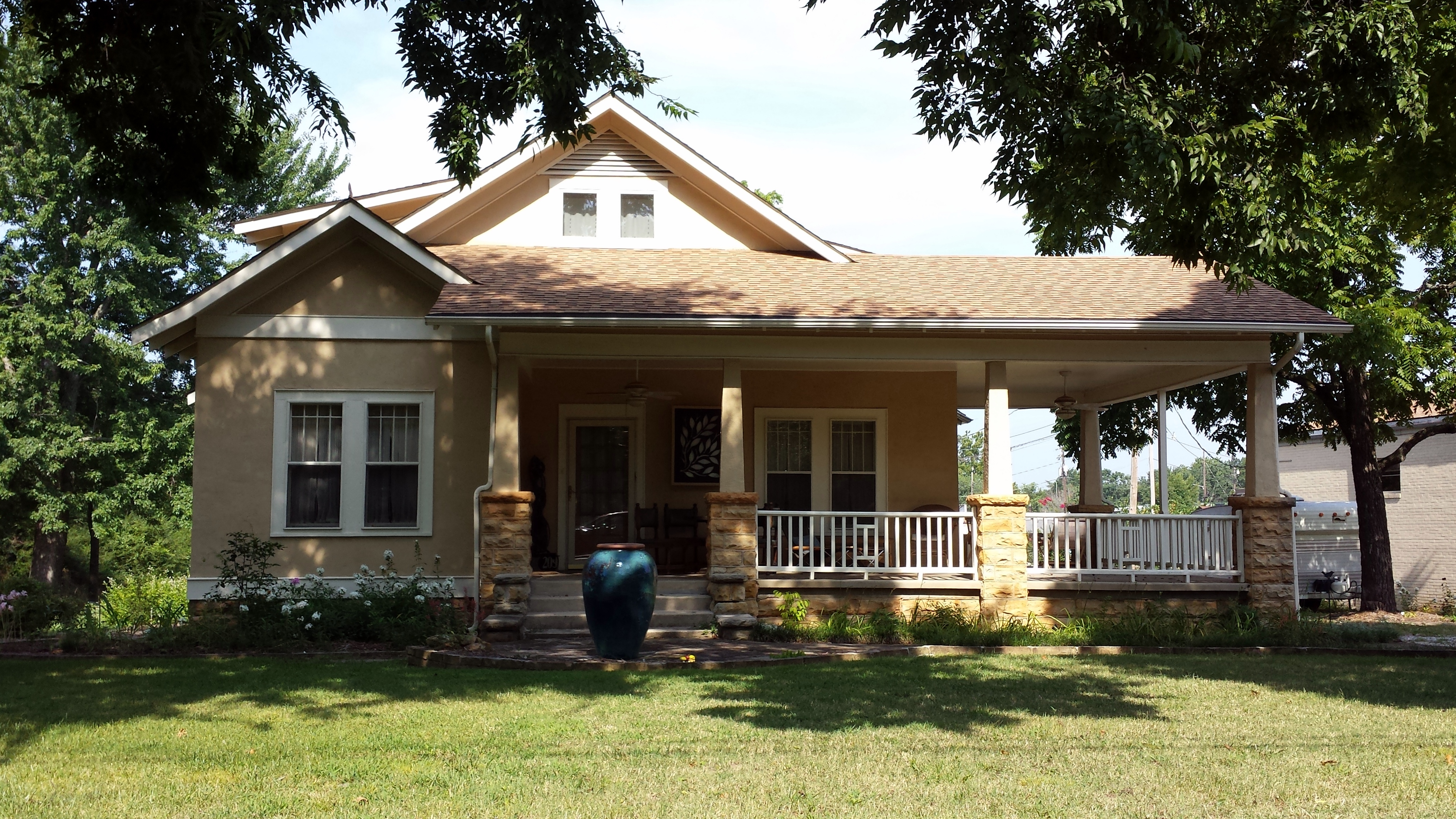

- Location within Arkansas Location within the United States
- Location: AR 9, Mountain View, Arkansas
- Coordinates: 35°52′3″N 92°7′6″W
- Area: less than one acre
- Built: 1924
- Architectural style: Bungalow/craftsman
- MPS: Stone County MRA
- NRHP reference No.: 85003398
- Added to NRHP: October 25, 1985

The John F. Brewer House is a historic house on Arkansas Highway 9 in Mountain View, Arkansas, one block south of the Stone County Courthouse. It is a roughly rectangular single-story wood-frame structure, with a gable roof and stuccoed exterior. Shed-roof dormers project from the sides of the roof, and a small gabled section projects forward on the left front facade, with a deep porch wrapping around to the right. There are exposed rafter ends at the eaves in the Craftsman style. This house, built in the 1920s, is believed to be the first Craftsman/Bungalow-style house built in Stone County.

The house was listed on the National Register of Historic Places in 1985.

== See also ==
- National Register of Historic Places listings in Stone County, Arkansas
