= A.B. Brewer Building =

- U.S. National Register of Historic Places
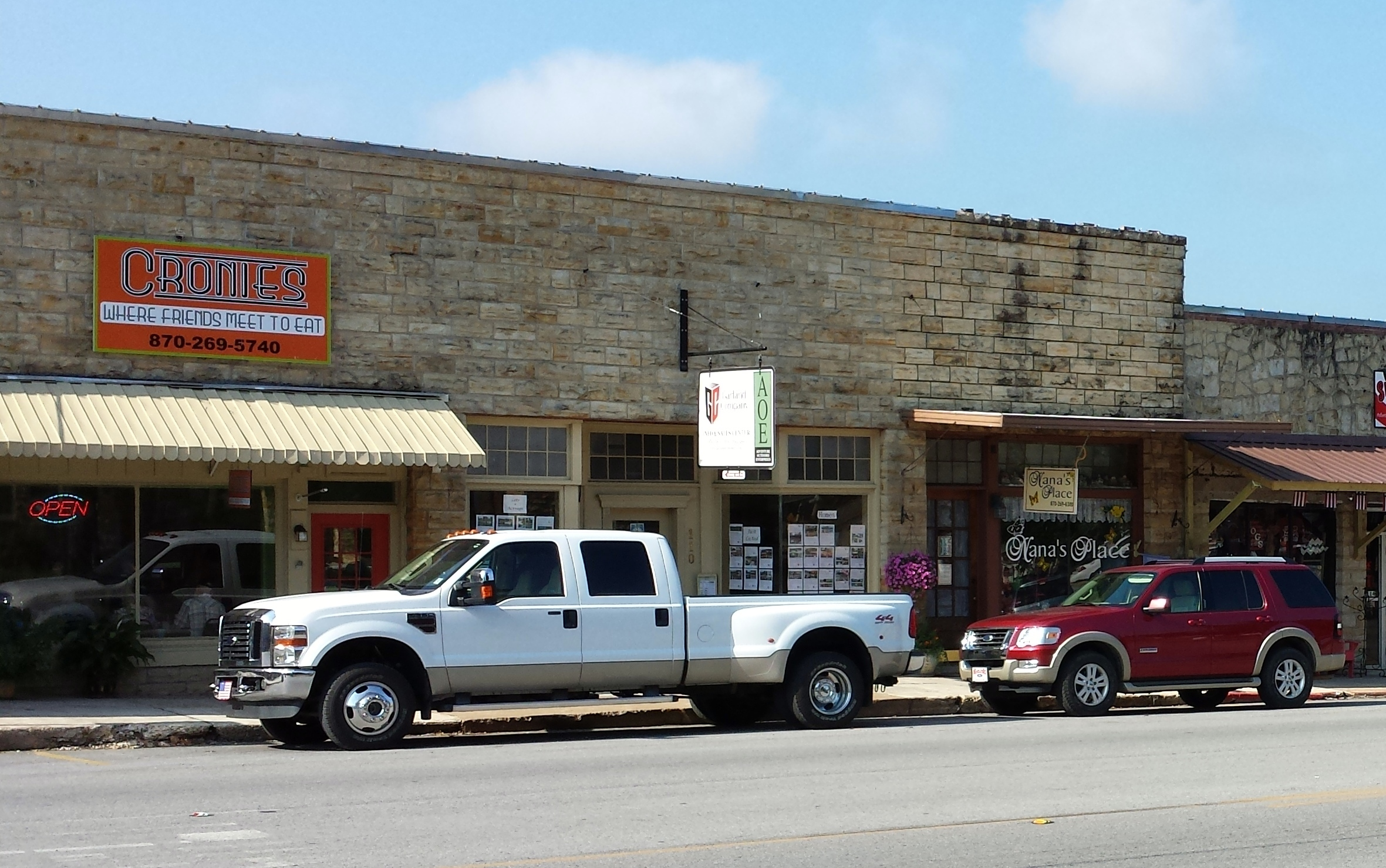

- Location within Arkansas Location within the United States
- Location: AR 66, Mountain View, Arkansas
- Coordinates: 35°52′6″N 92°7′6″W
- Area: less than one acre
- Built: 1929
- Architect: Brewer Bros.
- MPS: Stone County MRA
- NRHP reference No.: 85003395
- Added to NRHP: October 25, 1985

The A.B. Brewer Building is a historic commercial building on Arkansas Highway 66 in the central business district of Mountain View, Arkansas. It is a single-story structure, built out of load-bearing stone masonry, sharing party walls with adjacent buildings opposite the Stone County Courthouse, and houses three storefronts topped by a tall stone entablature. It was built in 1929 by the Brewer Brothers, who were local stonemasons.

The building was listed on the National Register of Historic Places in 1985.

== See also ==
- National Register of Historic Places listings in Stone County, Arkansas
