= Dew Drop Inn =

Dew Drop Inn may refer to:

- Dew Drop Inn (New Orleans, Louisiana)
- Dew Drop Inn (Mountain View, Arkansas)
- Dew Drop Inn (musical), 1923 Broadway musical
- The fictional setting in Charlie Daniels’ song Uneasy Rider
