= Bluff Springs Church and School =

Historic church in Arkansas, United States

- U.S. National Register of Historic Places
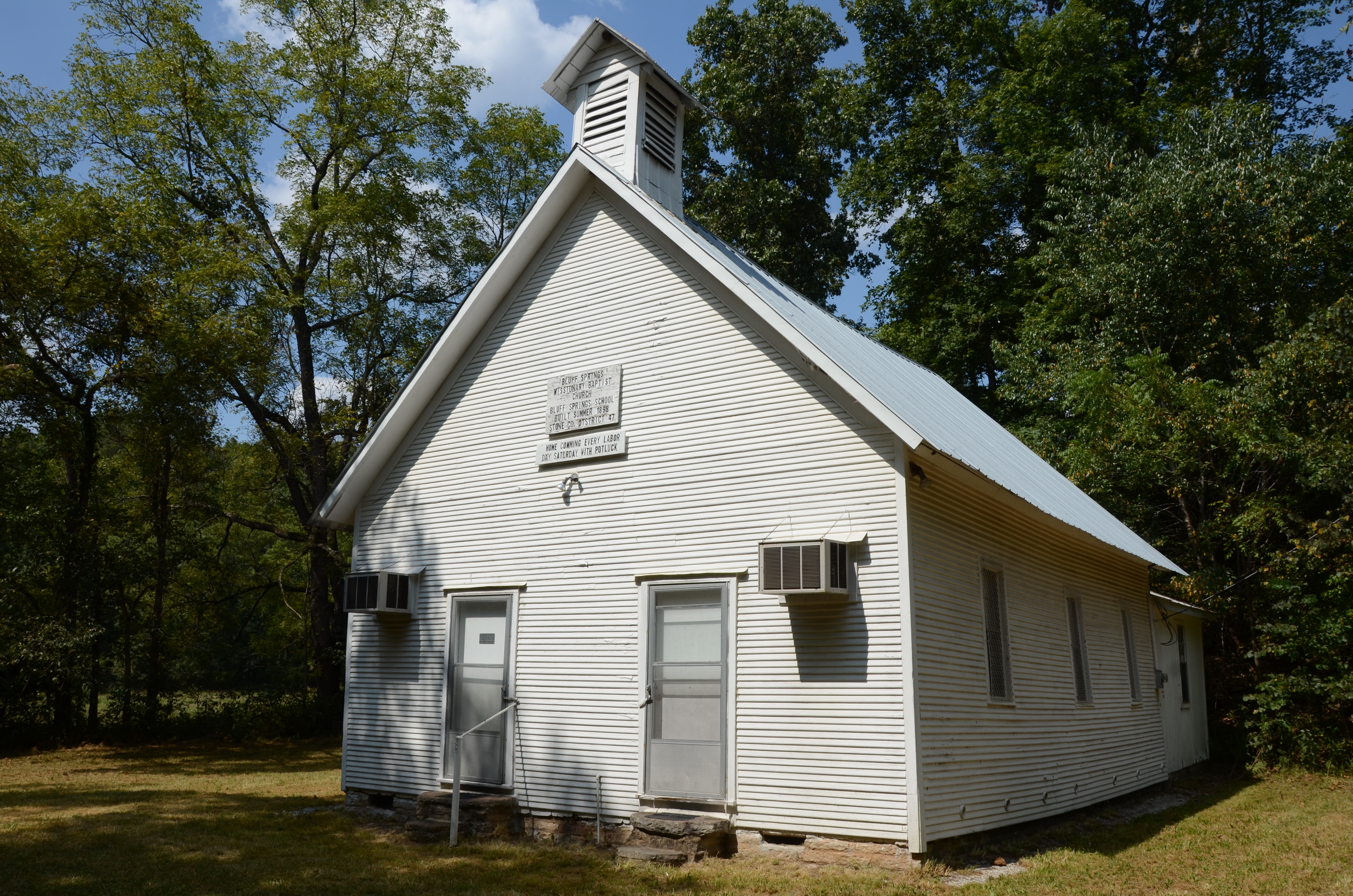

- Location within Arkansas Location within the United States
- Nearest city: Onia, Arkansas
- Coordinates: 35°55′29″N 92°23′41″W
- Area: less than one acre
- Built: 1900
- Architectural style: Rectangular Plan
- MPS: Stone County MRA
- NRHP reference No.: 85002210
- Added to NRHP: September 17, 1985

The Bluff Springs Church and School is a historic dual-purpose building in rural northwestern Stone County, Arkansas. It is located west of Onia, near the junction of county roads 136 and 140. It is a rectangular box-constructed structure, topped by a gable roof with a small belfry on top. It is covered with weatherboard siding and rests on stone foundation. The south-facing front has a pair of entrances, symmetrically placed, and there is a shed-roof addition to the north end. Built in 1900, it is one of the oldest school buildings in the county.

The building was listed on the National Register of Historic Places in 1985.

== See also ==
- National Register of Historic Places listings in Stone County, Arkansas
