= Roasting Ear Church and School =

Historic church in Arkansas, US

- U.S. National Register of Historic Places
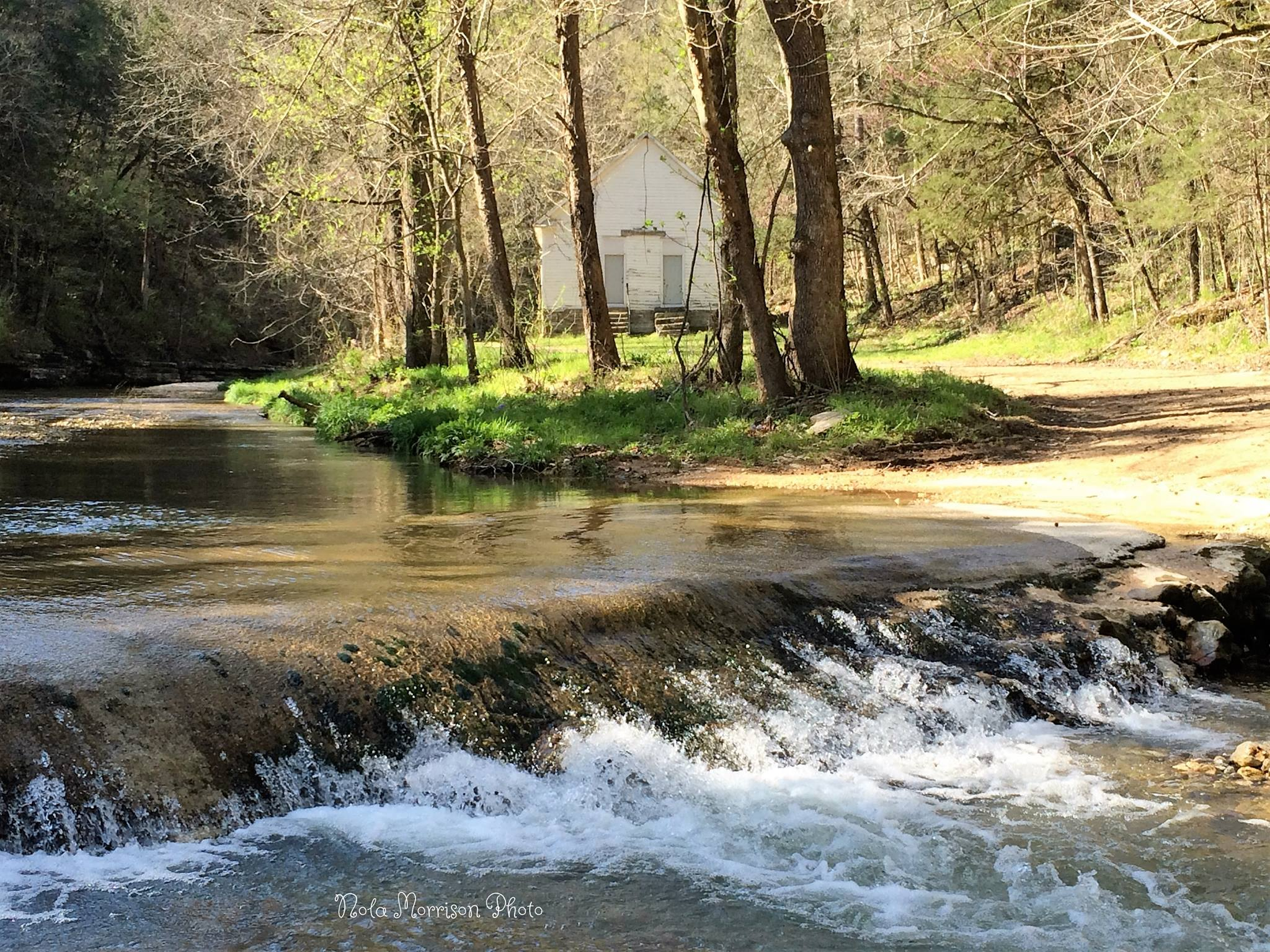

- Location within Arkansas Location within the United States
- Nearest city: Onia, Arkansas
- Coordinates: 35°56′51″N 92°17′20″W
- Area: less than one acre
- Built: 1918
- Architect: Dee Whitts
- Architectural style: Rectangular plan
- MPS: Stone County MRA
- NRHP reference No.: 85002230
- Added to NRHP: September 17, 1985

The Roasting Ear Church and School is a historic multifunction building in rural northwestern Stone County, Arkansas. It is located northeast of Onia, on County Road 48 west of its junction with County Road 86 (Roasting Ear Road). It is a single-story wood-frame structure, with a front-facing gable roof, weatherboard siding, and stone foundation. The main facade has a pair of symmetrically placed entrances with transom windows and simple molding, and otherwise lacks adornment. Built c. 1918, it is a well-preserved example of a typical rural Arkansas structure built to house both a church congregation and a local school.

The building was listed on the National Register of Historic Places in 1985.

== See also ==
- National Register of Historic Places listings in Stone County, Arkansas
