= Zachariah Ford House =

Historic house in Arkansas, United States

- U.S. National Register of Historic Places
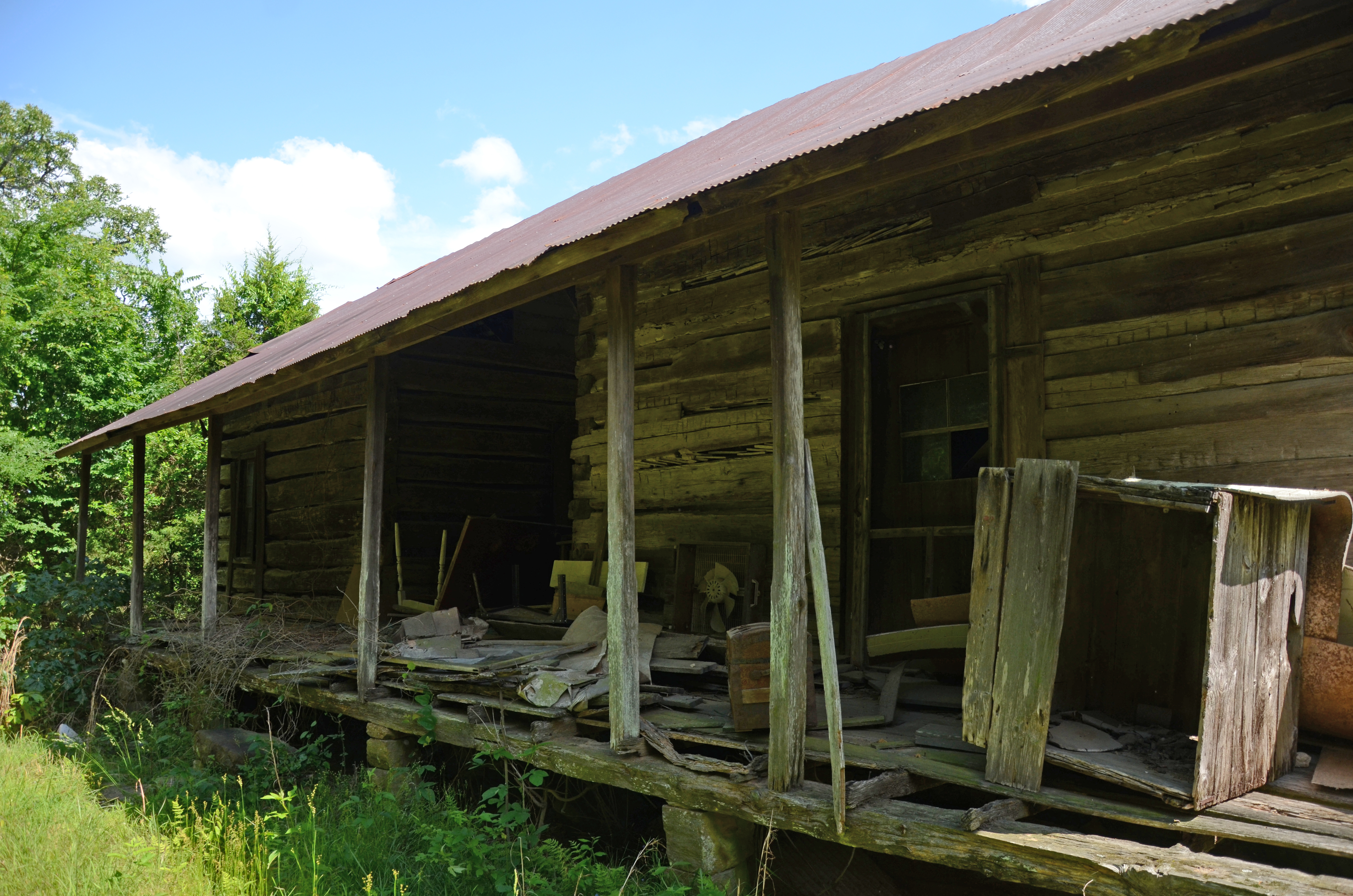

- Location within Arkansas Location within the United States
- Nearest city: Pleasant Grove, Stone County, Arkansas
- Coordinates: 35°51′7″N 91°52′4″W
- Area: less than one acre
- Built: 1856
- Architect: Ford, Zachariah; Ford, George
- Architectural style: Expanded Dogtrot Plan
- MPS: Stone County MRA
- NRHP reference No.: 85002206
- Added to NRHP: September 17, 1985

The Zachariah Ford House is a historic house in rural eastern Stone County, Arkansas. It is located northeast of Pleasant Grove, off County Road 46, on the bluffs overlooking the flood plain of the White River. It is a single-story dogtrot log structure, finished with weatherboard siding and a gable roof that extends over its front porch. It rests on stone piers, and is oriented on a north–south axis. The older of the building's two pens was built about 1856 by Zachariah Ford, and the second pen, breezeway, and roof were built by his son George. The building provides an excellent window into the early evolution of this housing form.

The house was listed on the National Register of Historic Places in 1985.

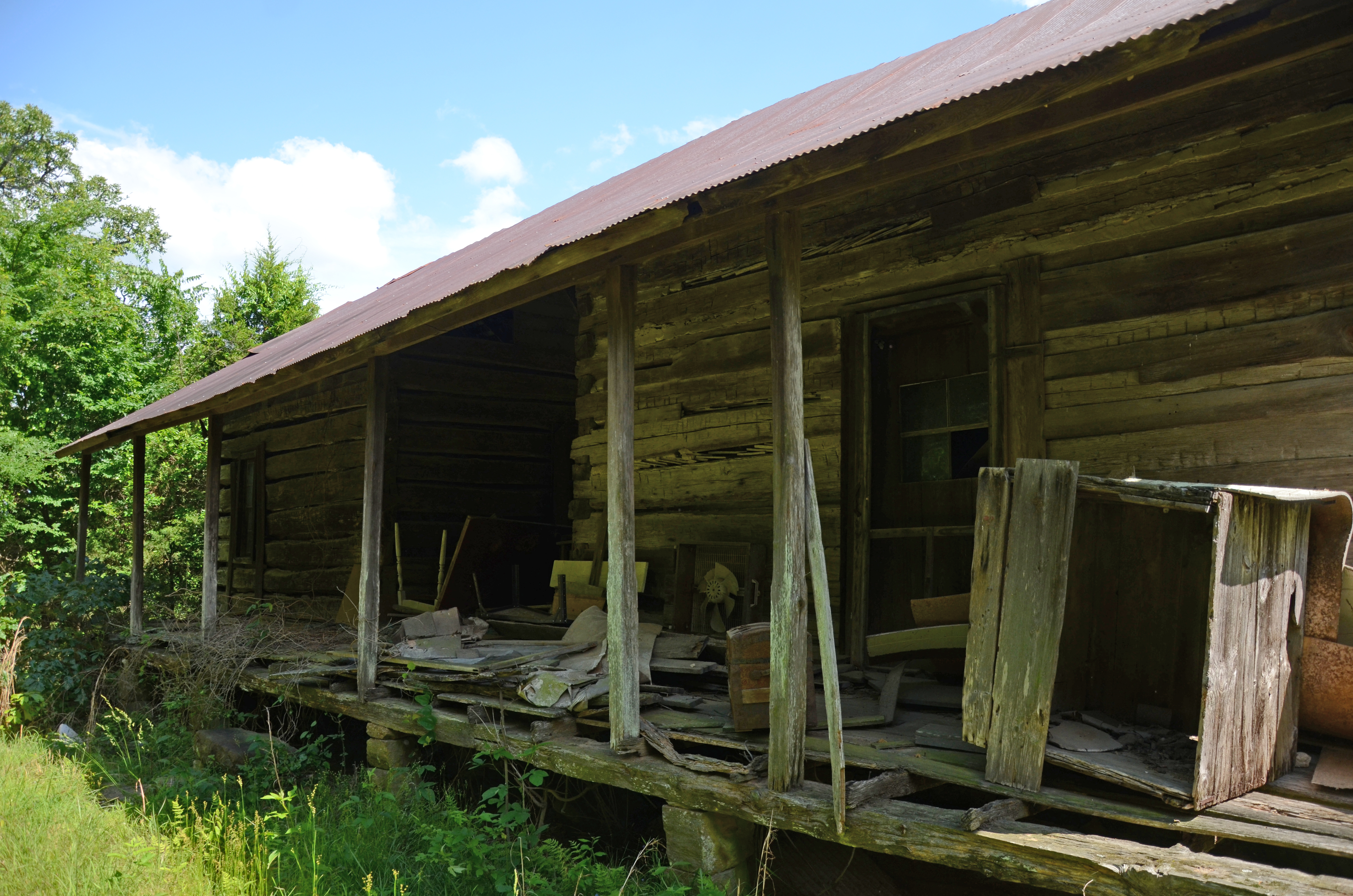
Front, 2016

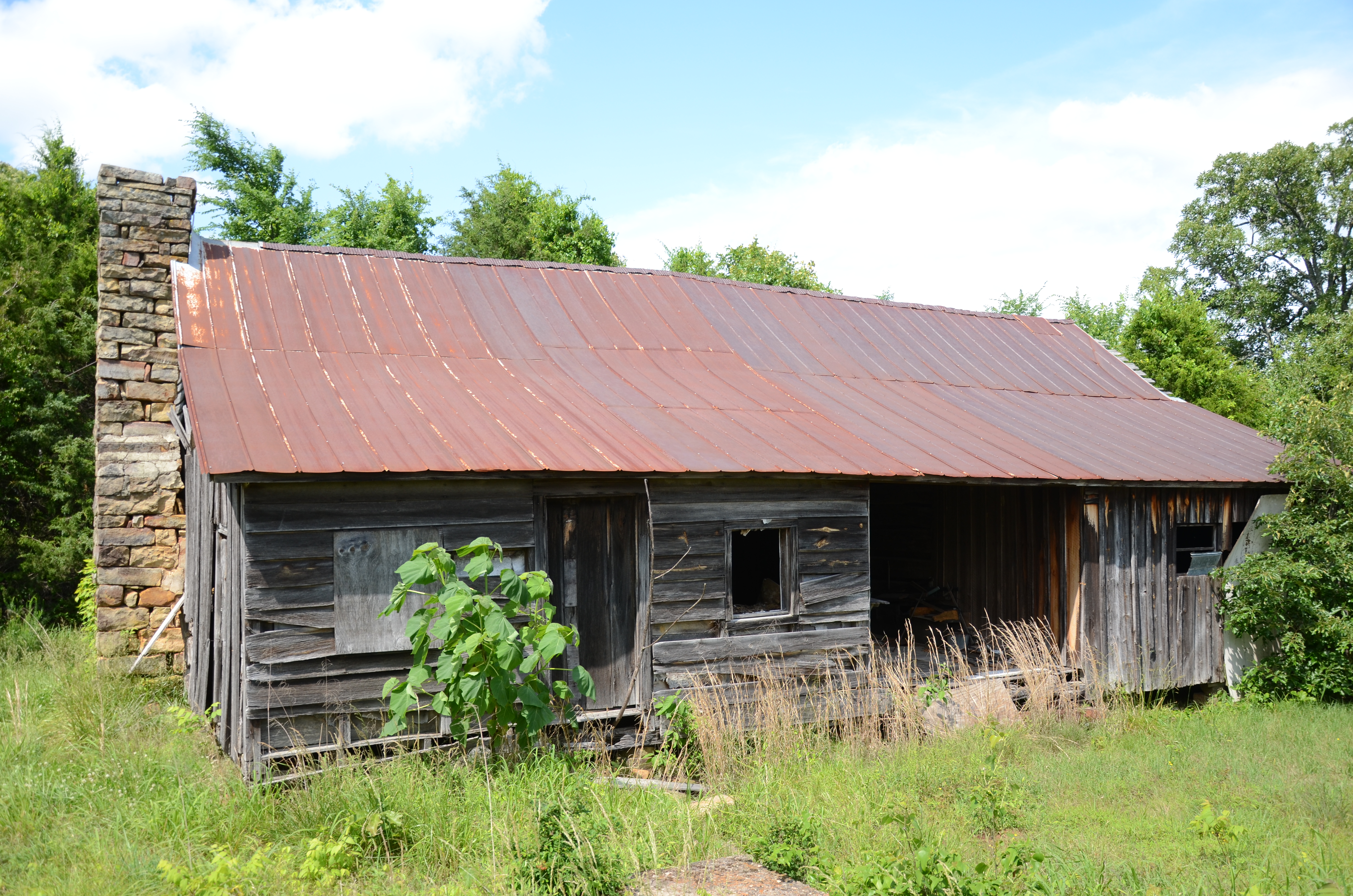
Rear, 2016

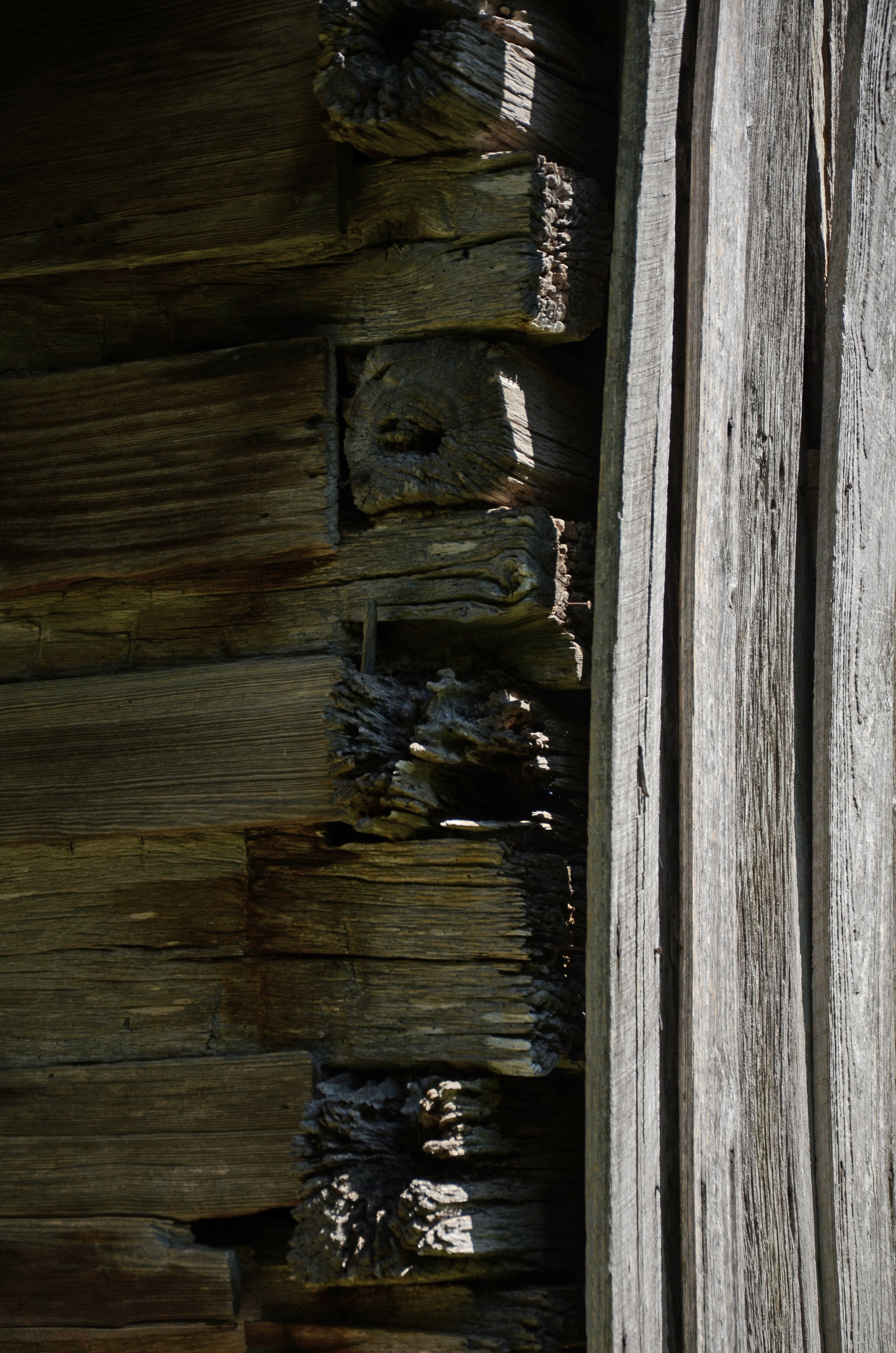
Corner Detail, 2016

== See also ==
- National Register of Historic Places listings in Stone County, Arkansas
