= H. J. Doughtery House =

Historic house in Arkansas, United States

- U.S. National Register of Historic Places
- Location within Arkansas Location within the United States
- Location: AR 14, Marcella, Arkansas
- Coordinates: 35°47′31″N 91°53′3″W
- Area: less than one acre
- Built: 1905
- Architectural style: Dogtrot plan
- MPS: Stone County MRA
- NRHP reference No.: 85002232
- Added to NRHP: September 17, 1985

The H. J. Doughtery House is a historic house on the west side of Arkansas Highway 14 in Marcella, Arkansas. Set relatively close to the road, it is a single-story wood frame dogtrot house, with a gable roof and a shed-roofed front porch extending across the east-facing front facade. It is clad in weatherboard and rests on stone piers. A fieldstone chimney rises at the northern end. Built about 1905, this house shows the evolution of the dogtrot, by the regular enclosure of its central breezeway, to something more closely resembling a center-hall plan house.

The house was listed on the National Register of Historic Places in 1985.

== See also ==
- National Register of Historic Places listings in Stone County, Arkansas
