= Henry Copeland =

Henry Copeland may refer to:

- Henry Copeland (furniture designer) (c. 1710–1754), English cabinetmaker and furniture designer
- Henry Copeland (politician) (1839–1904), member of the New South Wales Legislative Assembly

== See also ==
- Henry Copeland House, a historic house in Pleasant Grove, Stone County, Arkansas
