= Marcella Church & School =

Historic church in Arkansas, United States

- U.S. National Register of Historic Places
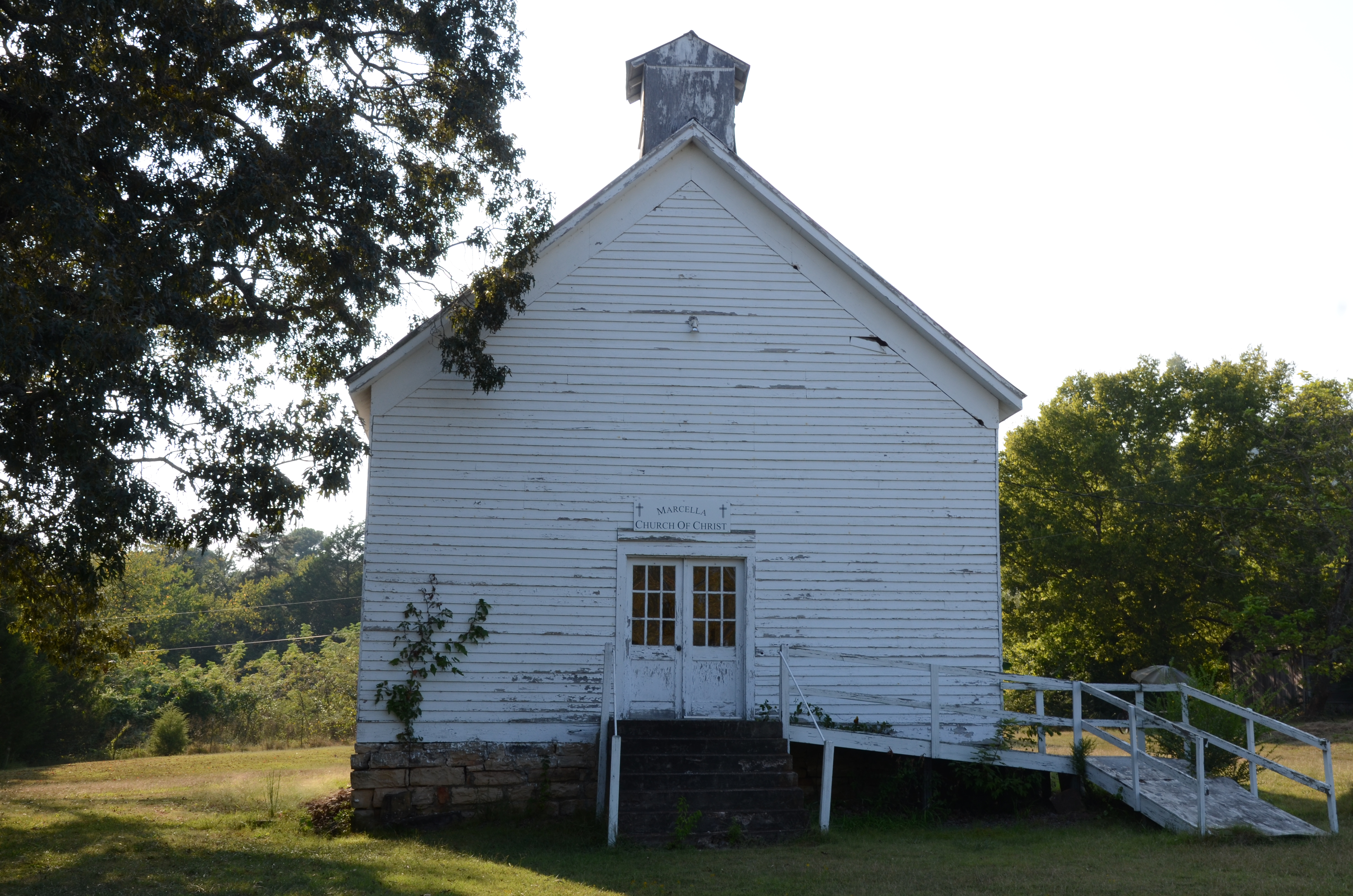

- Location within Arkansas Location within the United States
- Location: AR 14, Marcella, Arkansas
- Coordinates: 35°47′17″N 91°53′4″W
- Area: less than one acre
- Built: 1900
- Architectural style: Rectangular plan
- MPS: Stone County MRA
- NRHP reference No.: 85002237
- Added to NRHP: September 17, 1985

The Marcella Church & School is a historic multifunction building on Arkansas Highway 14 in Marcella, Arkansas. It is a single-story wood-frame structure, with a gable roof, weatherboard siding, and a small belfry. The side elevations each have five windows, and the front's only significant feature is the double-door entrance. Built about 1900, it is a typical and well-preserved example of a building used both as a local schoolhouse and as a church.

The building was listed on the National Register of Historic Places in 1985.

== See also ==
- National Register of Historic Places listings in Stone County, Arkansas
