= Owen Martin House =

Historic house in Arkansas, United States

- U.S. National Register of Historic Places
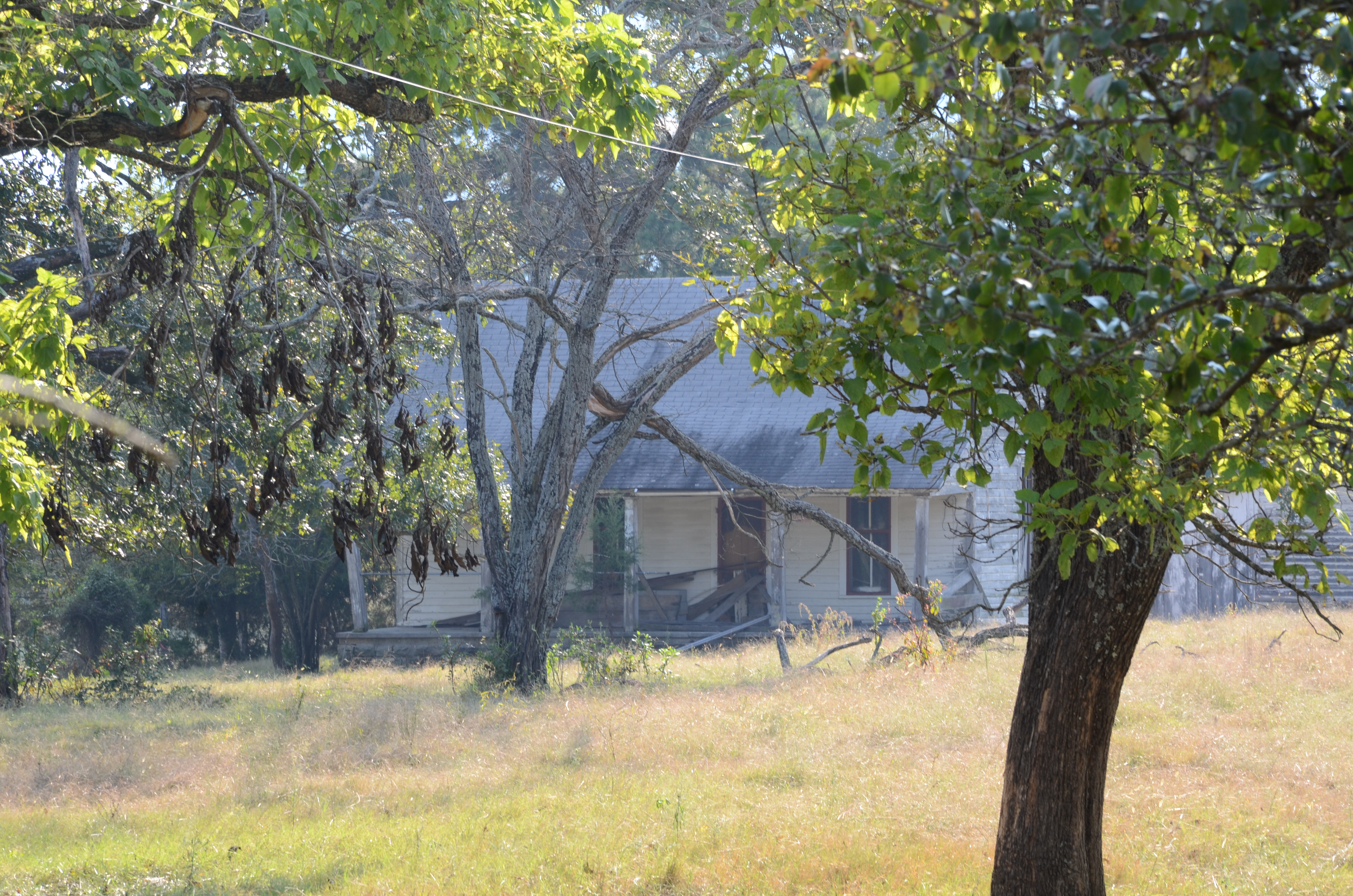

- Location within Arkansas Location within the United States
- Location: AR 14, Marcella, Arkansas
- Coordinates: 35°47′14″N 91°53′7″W
- Area: less than one acre
- Built: 1920
- Architectural style: Double-pen plan
- MPS: Stone County MRA
- NRHP reference No.: 85003397
- Added to NRHP: October 25, 1985

The Owen Martin House is a historic house on Arkansas Highway 14 in Marcella, Arkansas. Situated on a relatively open field west of the highway (screened by another property in front of it), it is a single-story wood-frame structure, in a double-pen dogtrot plan, with a side-gable roof and weatherboard siding. A shed-roof porch extends across the east-facing front, supported by square posts, and a cross-gabled ell extends west from the rear of the southern pen. The house was built in about 1920, illustrating the persistence of the traditional form well into the 20th century.

The house was listed on the National Register of Historic Places in 1985.

== See also ==
- National Register of Historic Places listings in Stone County, Arkansas
