= Newton Sutterfield Farmstead =

Historic house in Arkansas, United States

- U.S. National Register of Historic Places
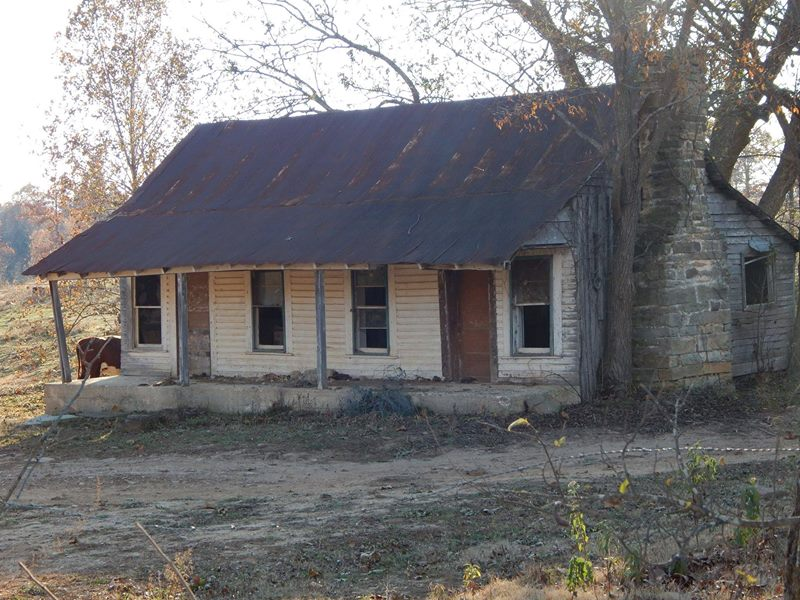

- Location within Arkansas Location within the United States
- Location: 1797 Horton Hill Rd., Alco, Arkansas
- Coordinates: 35°54′44″N 92°23′29″W
- Area: 3 acres (1.2 ha)
- Built: 1850
- Architect: Newton Sutterfield
- MPS: Stone County MRA
- NRHP reference No.: 03000398
- Added to NRHP: May 20, 2003

The Newton Sutterfield House is a historic house at 1797 Horton Hill Road in Alco, Arkansas. It is a single-story double-pen log structure, finished in weatherboard siding and topped by a gable roof. A porch extends across the front, sheltering separate entrances into each pen. The house's construction date is uncertain, but is estimated to be about 1850. It is one of Stone County's few pre-Civil War structures to survive.

The house was listed on the National Register of Historic Places in 2003.

== See also ==
- National Register of Historic Places listings in Stone County, Arkansas
