= Sugarloaf Fire Tower Historic District =

Historic district in Arkansas, United States

- U.S. National Register of Historic Places
- U.S. Historic district
- Location within Arkansas Location within the United States
- Nearest city: Calico Rock, Arkansas
- Coordinates: 36°5′2″N 92°9′48″W
- Area: 2 acres (0.81 ha)
- Built by: Civilian Conservation Corps
- Architectural style: Rustic
- MPS: Facilities Constructed by the CCC in Arkansas MPS
- NRHP reference No.: 94001615
- Added to NRHP: September 11, 1995

The Sugarloaf Fire Tower Historic District encompasses a collection of historic buildings located near the summit of Sugarloaf Mountain, a hill 1150 feet in elevation in the Ozark-St. Francis National Forest of northeastern Stone County, Arkansas. The main structure is a braced metal-frame fire tower, alongside which stand a residence, privy, and vaulted stone storage cellar. These structures were all built in 1937 by a crew of the Civilian Conservation Corps, and is particularly unusual because the fire watch facility included a residence.

The district was listed on the National Register of Historic Places in 1995.

== See also ==
- National Register of Historic Places listings in Stone County, Arkansas
