= Noricks Chapel School =

- U.S. National Register of Historic Places
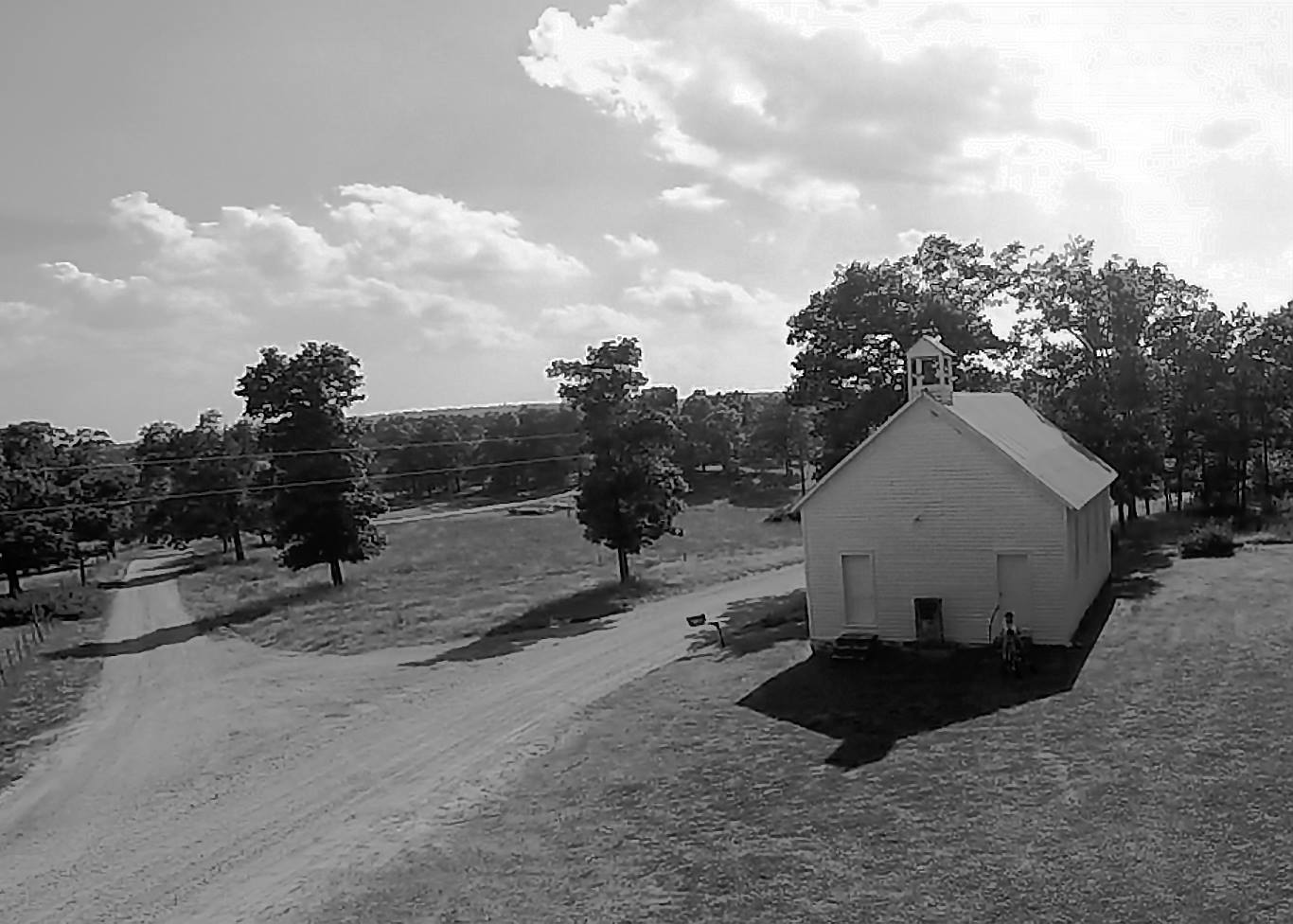

- Location within Arkansas Location within the United States
- Nearest city: Mountain View, Arkansas
- Coordinates: 35°47′8″N 92°1′12″W
- Area: less than one acre
- Built: c. 1907
- MPS: Stone County MRA
- NRHP reference No.: 98000615
- Added to NRHP: June 4, 1998

The Noricks Chapel School is a historic combination school and church building in rural southeastern Stone County, Arkansas, built around 1907. It was a one-room schoolhouse. It is located about 10 miles (16 km) southeast of Mountain View, on the north side of County Road 28. It is a simple single-story wood-frame structure, with a gable roof and weatherboard siding. A small belfry stands on the roof ridge, and the main facade has two entrances. It was built c. 1907 to provide schooling to the children of the Noricks Chapel community, and is one of a small number of such rural schools to survive in the county.

The building was listed on the National Register of Historic Places in 1998.

== See also ==
- National Register of Historic Places listings in Stone County, Arkansas
