= Commercial Hotel (Mountain View, Arkansas) =

- U.S. National Register of Historic Places
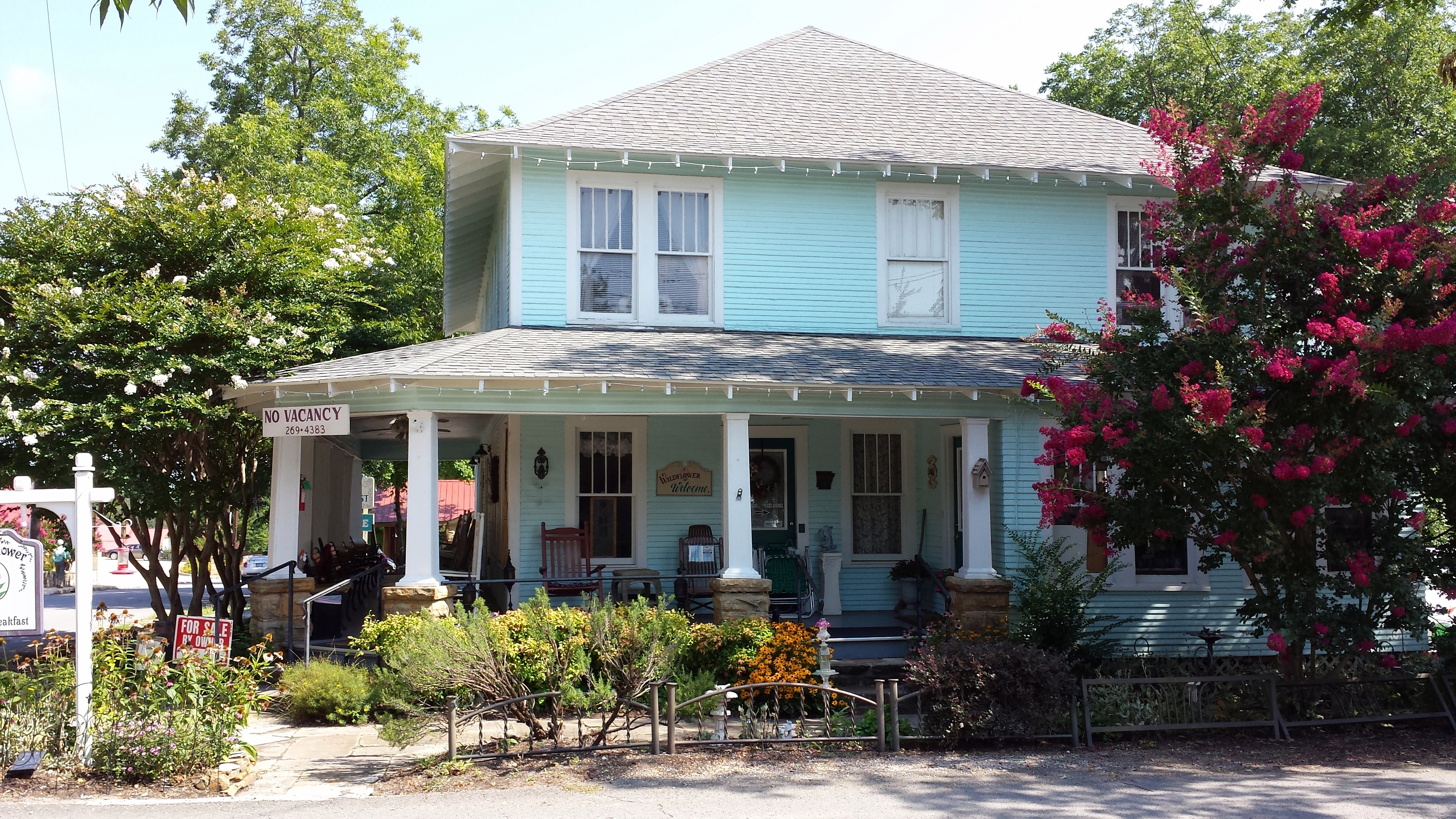

- Location within Arkansas Location within the United States
- Location: Off AR 66, Mountain View, Arkansas
- Coordinates: 35°52′10″N 92°07′03″W
- Area: less than one acre
- Built: 1925
- MPS: Stone County MRA
- NRHP reference No.: 85002223
- Added to NRHP: September 17, 1985

The Commercial Hotel is a historic hotel building facing the courthouse square of Mountain View, Arkansas. It is a two-story wood-frame structure, rectangular in plan, with a hip roof that has exposed rafter ends, and weatherboard siding. A porch wraps around its principal facades, supported by box columns. Built in 1918, it is a local example of commercial Craftsman architecture and one of two surviving hotel buildings from the 1920s in the community.

The building was listed on the National Register of Historic Places in 1985.

== See also ==
- National Register of Historic Places listings in Stone County, Arkansas
