= C.B. Case Motor Co. Building =

- U.S. National Register of Historic Places
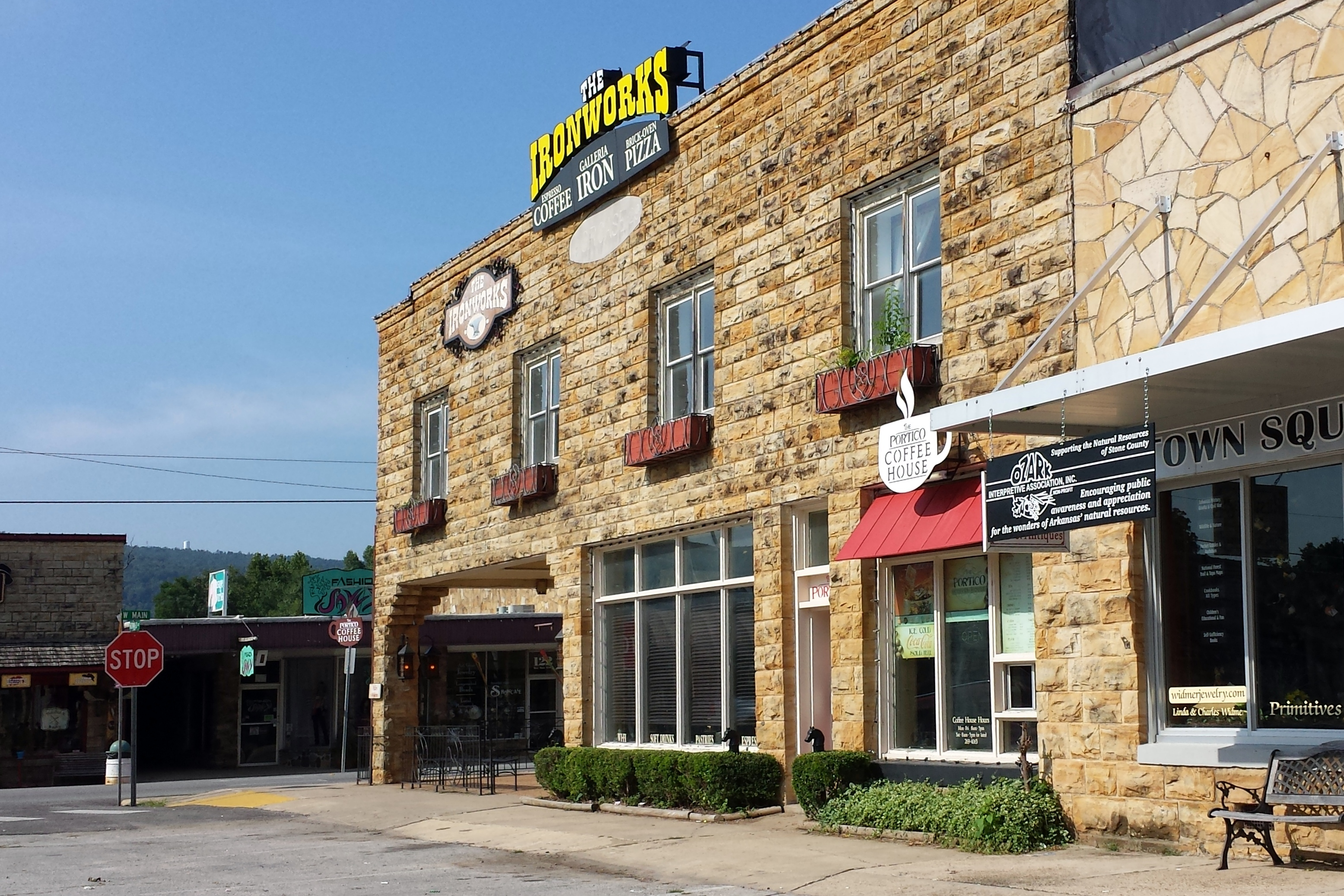

- Location within Arkansas Location within the United States
- Location: AR 66, Mountain View, Arkansas
- Coordinates: 35°52′8″N 92°7′8″W
- Area: less than one acre
- Built: 1928
- Built by: Brewer Bros.
- MPS: Stone County MRA
- NRHP reference No.: 85002222
- Added to NRHP: September 17, 1985

The C.B. Case Motor Co. Building is a historic commercial building at West Main and Howard Streets in downtown Mountain View, Arkansas. Built in 1928 by the locally prominent Brewer brothers, this stone building was the first automobile dealership and service station in Stone County. It is a two-story structure, with an angled open service area at the corner, behind which are lined plate glass windows to the showroom. It is also one of the community's largest commercial buildings.

The building was listed on the National Register of Historic Places in 1985.

== See also ==
- National Register of Historic Places listings in Stone County, Arkansas
