= George Anderson House =

Historic house in Arkansas, United States

- U.S. National Register of Historic Places
- Location within Arkansas Location within the United States
- Location: W of Big Springs, Big Springs, Arkansas
- Coordinates: 35°54′3″N 92°16′56″W
- Area: less than one acre
- Built: 1890
- Architectural style: Dogtrot plan
- MPS: Stone County MRA
- NRHP reference No.: 85002218
- Added to NRHP: September 17, 1985

The George Anderson House is a historic house located in rural central-western Stone County, Arkansas, a few miles west of Big Spring.

== Description and history ==
Built about 1890, it is the latest known 19th-century dogtrot house surviving in the county. Its two pens are fashioned out of hewn logs joined by saddle notches, and is sheltered by a gable roof. The pens have been sheathed in weatherboard, and a full-width porch extends across the building's front.

The house was listed on the National Register of Historic Places on September 17, 1985.

== See also ==
- National Register of Historic Places listings in Stone County, Arkansas
