= Orvall Gammill Barn =

- U.S. National Register of Historic Places
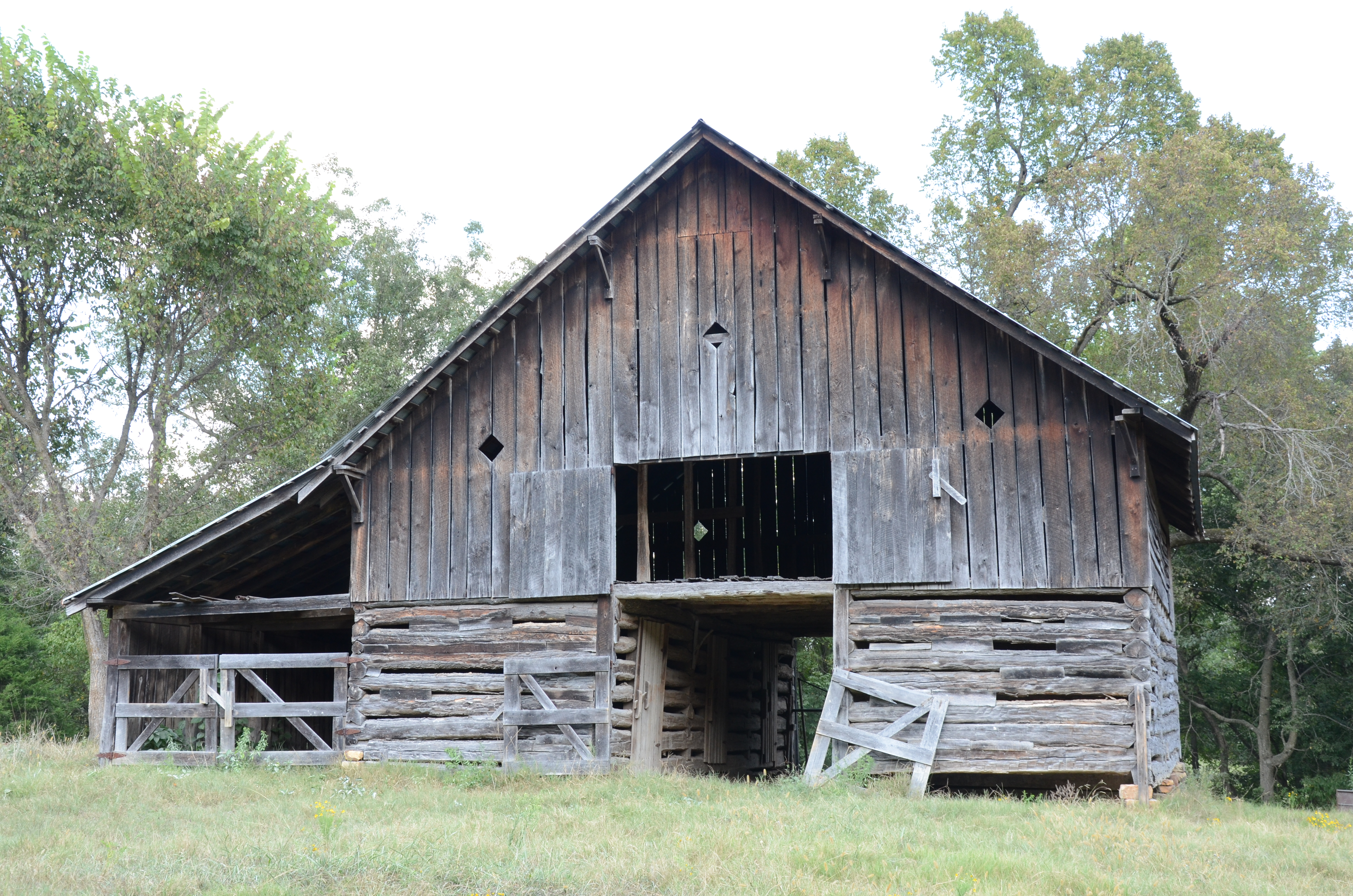

- Location within Arkansas Location within the United States
- Location: NW of Big Springs, Arkansas
- Coordinates: 35°54′36″N 92°16′25″W
- Area: less than one acre
- Built: 1922
- Architectural style: Traverse Crib plan
- MPS: Stone County MRA
- NRHP reference No.: 85002229
- Added to NRHP: September 17, 1985

The Orvall Gammill Barn is a historic barn on the northeast side of Stone County Road 87 northwest of Big Springs, Arkansas. It is a two-story structure, built out of a combination of logs and timber framing, with a gable roof, the gable oriented toward the road. It is built in a transverse crib pattern, with a series of log cribs fashioned out of hand-hewn logs joined by V notches, with a wood-framed loft area above. A shed addition extends along the building's north side. It was built in 1922 by Orvall Gammill and is locally unusual due to its transverse crib form being executed in logs rather than lumber framing.

The barn was listed on the National Register of Historic Places in 1985.

== See also ==
- National Register of Historic Places listings in Stone County, Arkansas
