= Lackey General Merchandise and Warehouse =

- U.S. National Register of Historic Places
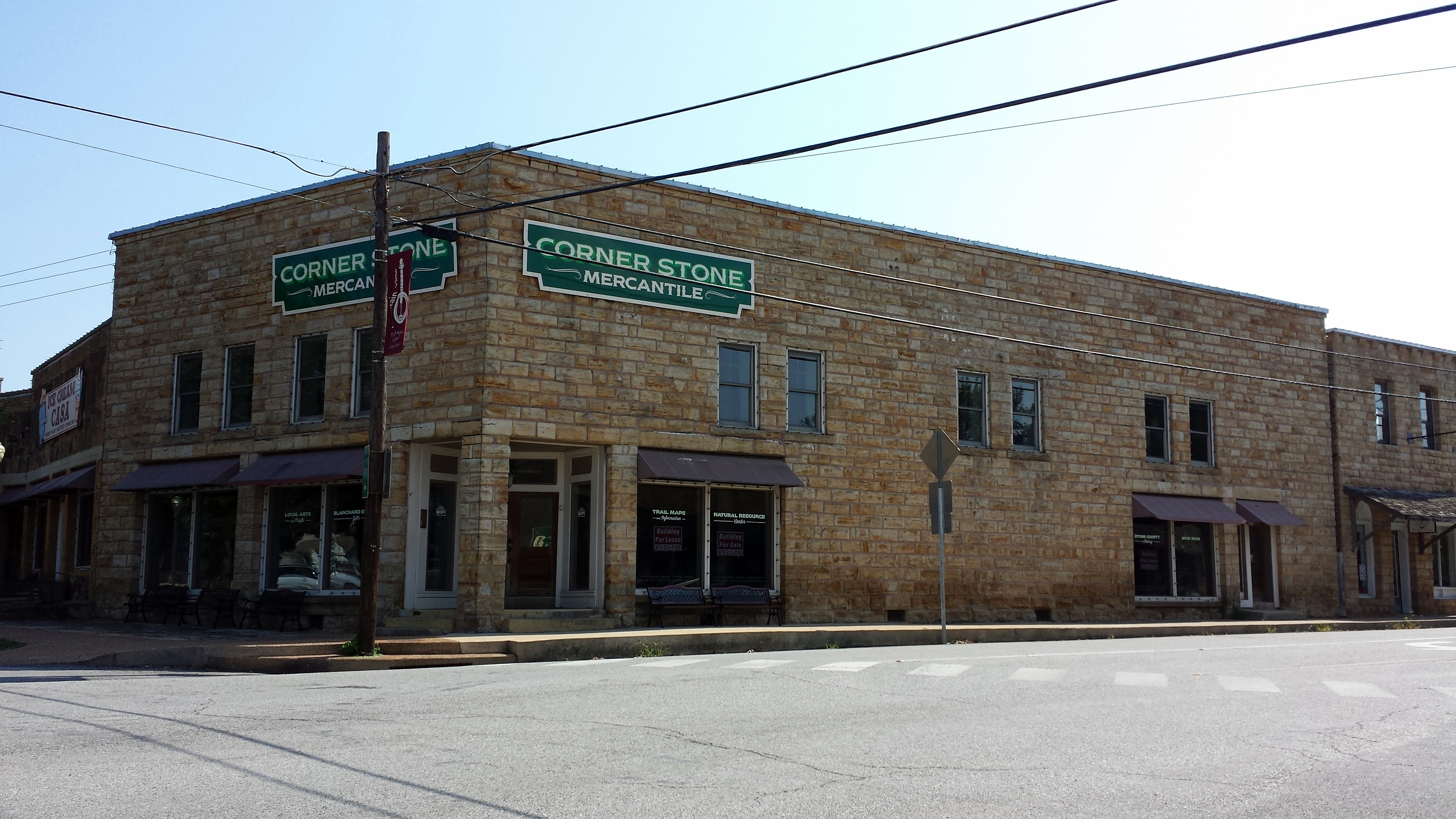

- Location within Arkansas Location within the United States
- Location: AR 66, Mountain View, Arkansas
- Coordinates: 35°52′7″N 92°7′3″W
- Area: less than one acre
- Built: 1924
- Built by: Bill Laroe (stonemason)
- Architectural style: Rectangular plan
- MPS: Stone County MRA
- NRHP reference No.: 85002233
- Added to NRHP: September 17, 1985

Lackey General Merchandise and Warehouse is a historic commercial building at the northeast corner of Arkansas Highway 66 and North Peabody Avenue in the center of Mountain View, Arkansas. It is a roughly rectangular two-story structure, built out of local stone, with a flat roof surrounded by a low parapet. Its main facade faces west toward the Stone County Courthouse, with plate glass windows topped by awnings on the first floor, and four sash windows on the second. The main entrance is in an angle at the street corner, with the building corner supported by a square stone post. Built in 1924, it is believed to be the largest commercial building in Stone County.

The building was listed on the National Register of Historic Places in 1985.

== See also ==
- National Register of Historic Places listings in Stone County, Arkansas
