= Clark–King House =

Historic house in Arkansas, United States

- U.S. National Register of Historic Places
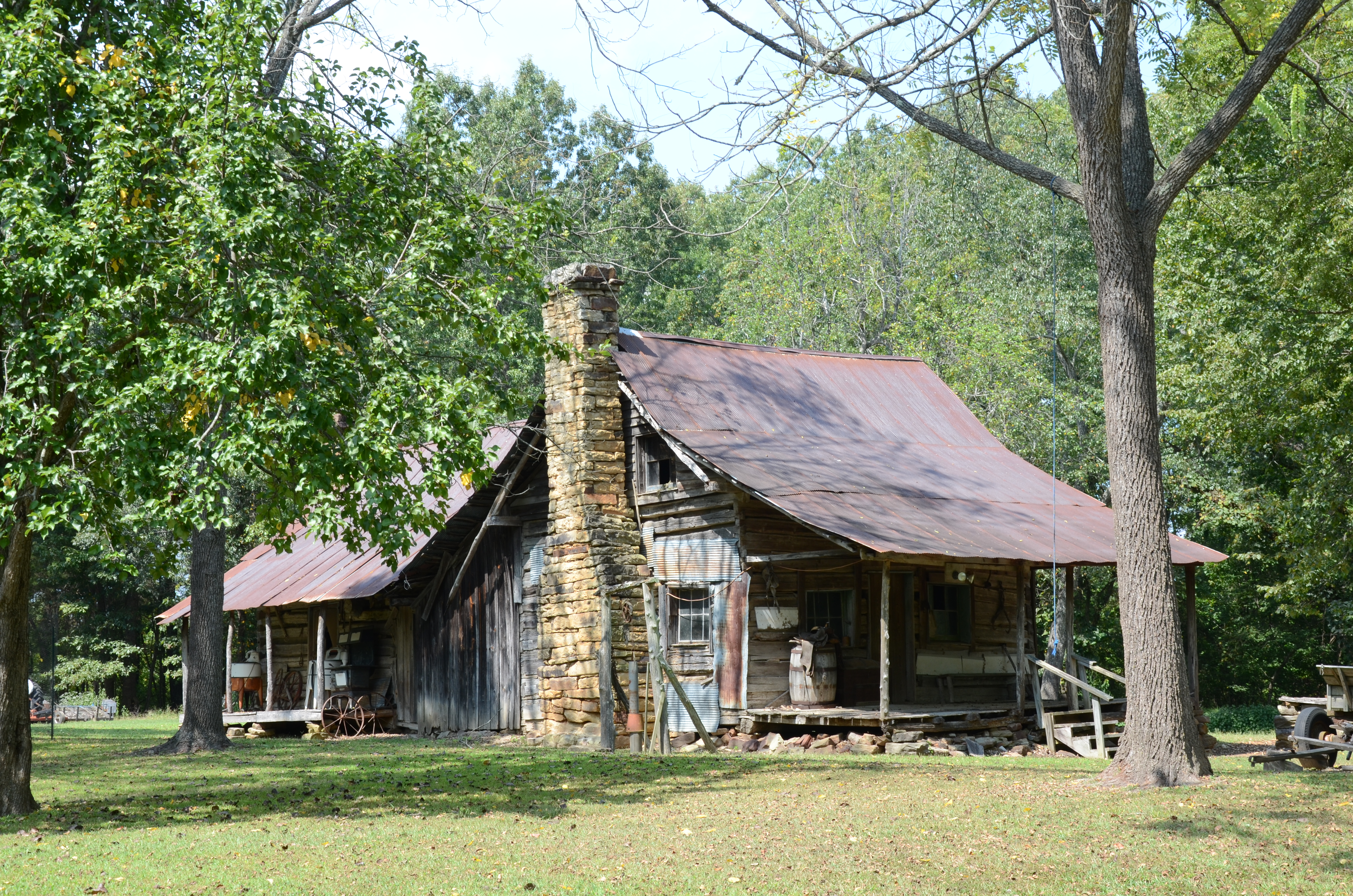

- Location within Arkansas Location within the United States
- Nearest city: Mountain View, Arkansas
- Coordinates: 35°53′4″N 92°7′32″W
- Area: less than one acre
- Built: 1885
- Built by: P.C. Clark
- Architectural style: Log Two Pen plan
- MPS: Stone County MRA
- NRHP reference No.: 85002234
- Added to NRHP: September 17, 1985

The Clark–King House is a historic house in Stone County, Arkansas, just outside the city limits of Mountain View. Located near the end of County Road 146, it is a single-story log structure with two pens, one built c. 1885 and the other c. 1889. The main (east-facing) facade has a porch extending across the front, under the gable roof that shelters the original pen. The breezeway between the pens has been enclosed with board and batten siding. The first pen was built by P.C. Clark; the second by Rev. Jacob King, a prominent local circuit preacher of the period.

The house was listed on the National Register of Historic Places in 1985.

== See also ==
- National Register of Historic Places listings in Stone County, Arkansas
