= Henry Copeland House =

Historic house in Arkansas, United States

- U.S. National Register of Historic Places
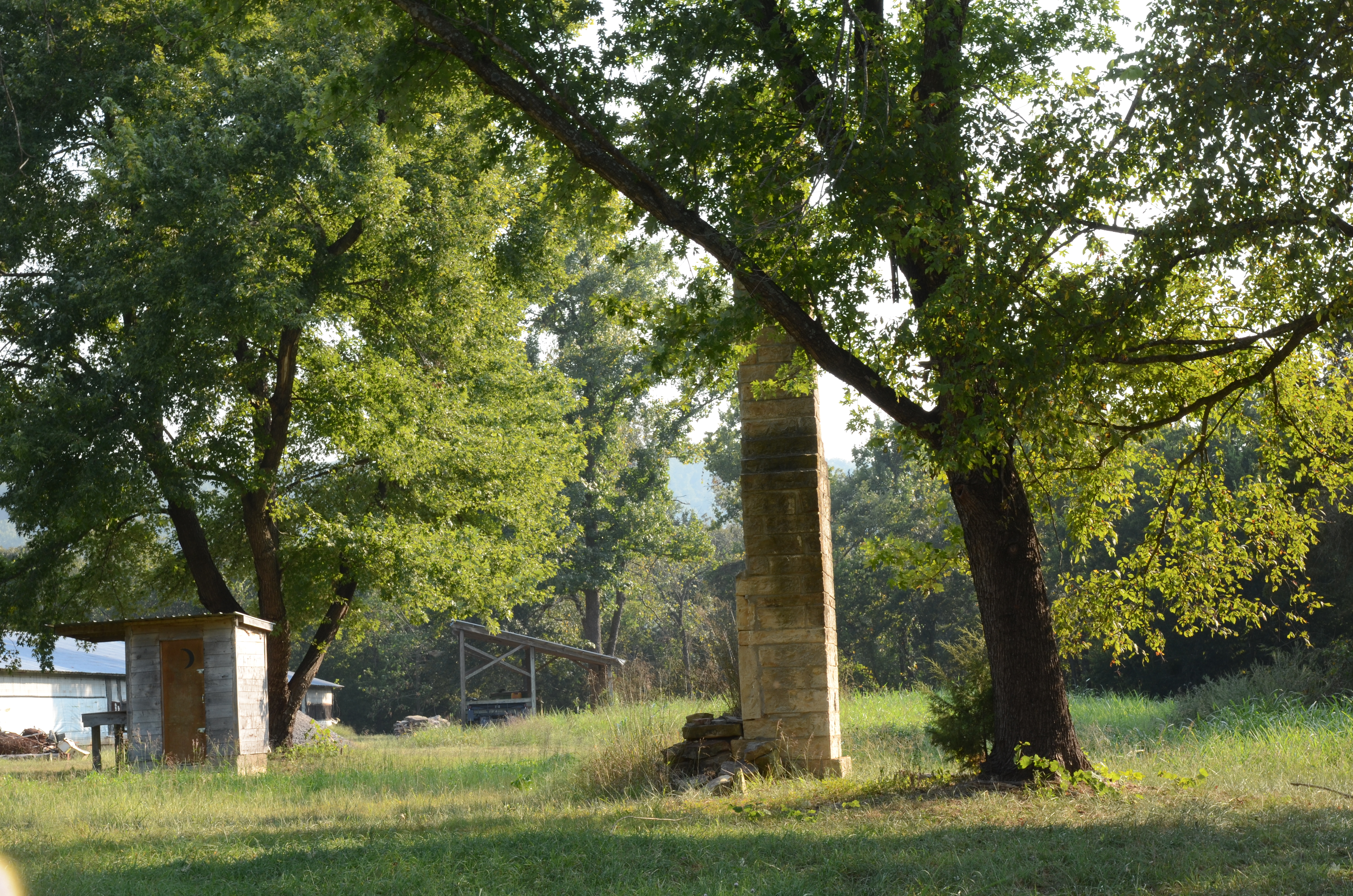

- Location within Arkansas Location within the United States
- Location: AR 14, Pleasant Grove, Stone County, Arkansas
- Coordinates: 35°48′56″N 91°54′29″W
- Area: less than one acre
- Built: 1900
- Architectural style: Double Pen plan
- MPS: Stone County MRA
- NRHP reference No.: 85002224
- Added to NRHP: September 17, 1985

The Henry Copeland House is a historic house on Arkansas Highway 14 in Pleasant Grove, a small community in southeastern Stone County, Arkansas. It is a single-story wood-frame structure, built in a traditional dogtrot form with two pens and a breezeway. Ells extend the house to the rear and off the northern pen. A hip-roof porch extends across the front, supported by turned posts. Built about 1895, the house is a fine local example of period vernacular architecture combining traditional forms with the then-fashionable Victorian styles.

The house was listed on the National Register of Historic Places in 1985.

== See also ==
- National Register of Historic Places listings in Stone County, Arkansas
