= Thomas E. Hess House =

Historic house in Arkansas, United States

- U.S. National Register of Historic Places
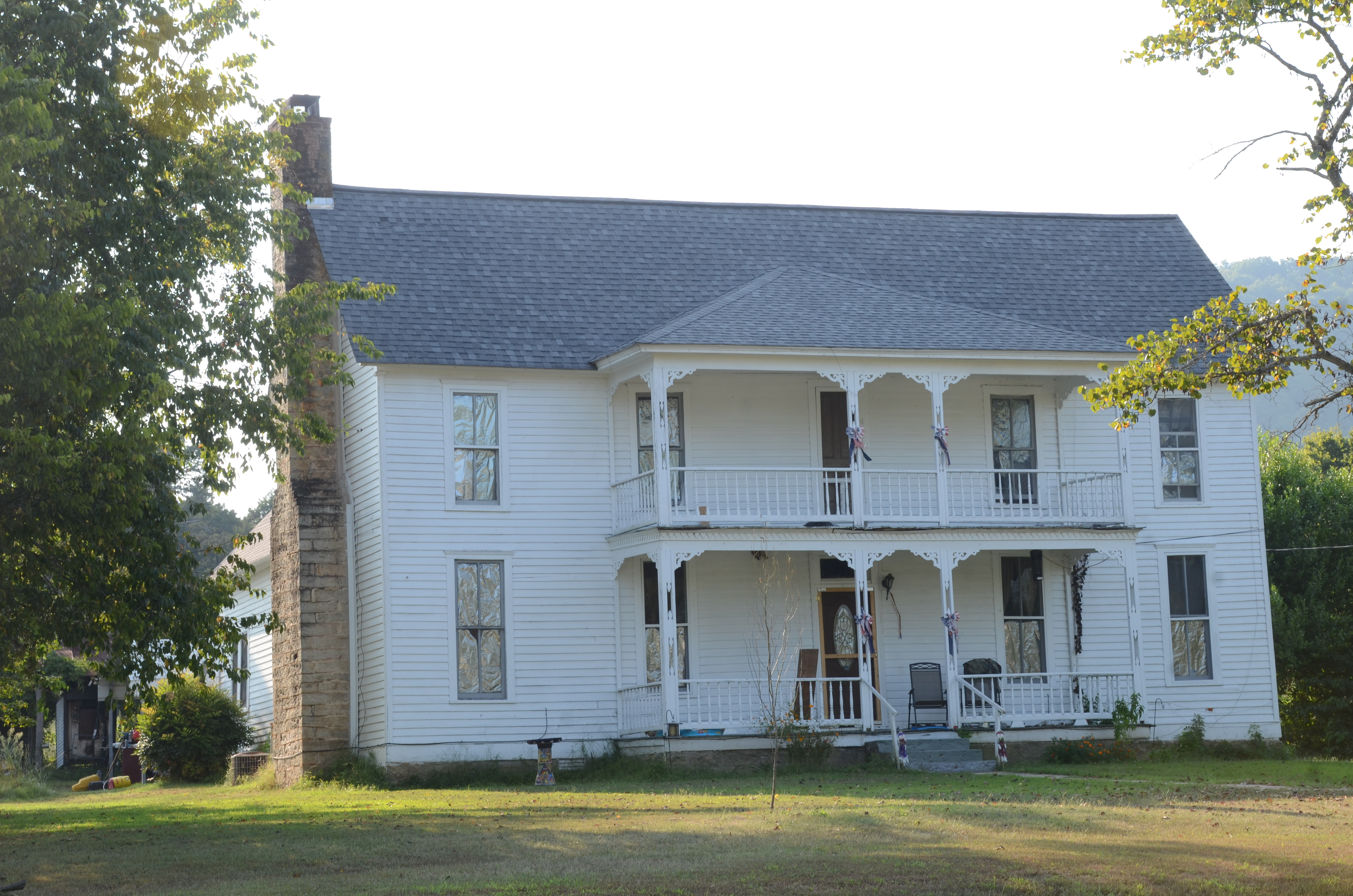

- Location within Arkansas Location within the United States
- Location: AR 14, Marcella, Arkansas
- Coordinates: 35.78872°N 91.88415°W
- Area: 6.4 acres (2.6 ha)
- Built: 1900
- Built by: Thomas E. Hess
- Architectural style: I House
- NRHP reference No.: 83003548
- Added to NRHP: December 27, 1983

The Thomas E. Hess House is a historic house on Arkansas Highway 14 in Marcella, Arkansas. It is a two-story I-house, five bays wide, with a side gable roof, weatherboard siding, and stone foundation. A two-story porch extends across the middle three bays of the north-facing front facade, with some jigsaw decorative work and turned balusters. An ell extends to the rear, and the rear porch has been enclosed. The house was built in 1900 by Thomas E. Hess, grandson of William Hess, the area's first white settler. Other buildings on the property include a barn, stone cellar, and a log corn crib that was originally built as a schoolhouse.

The house was listed on the National Register of Historic Places in 1983.

== See also ==
- National Register of Historic Places listings in Stone County, Arkansas
