= Stegall General Store =

- U.S. National Register of Historic Places
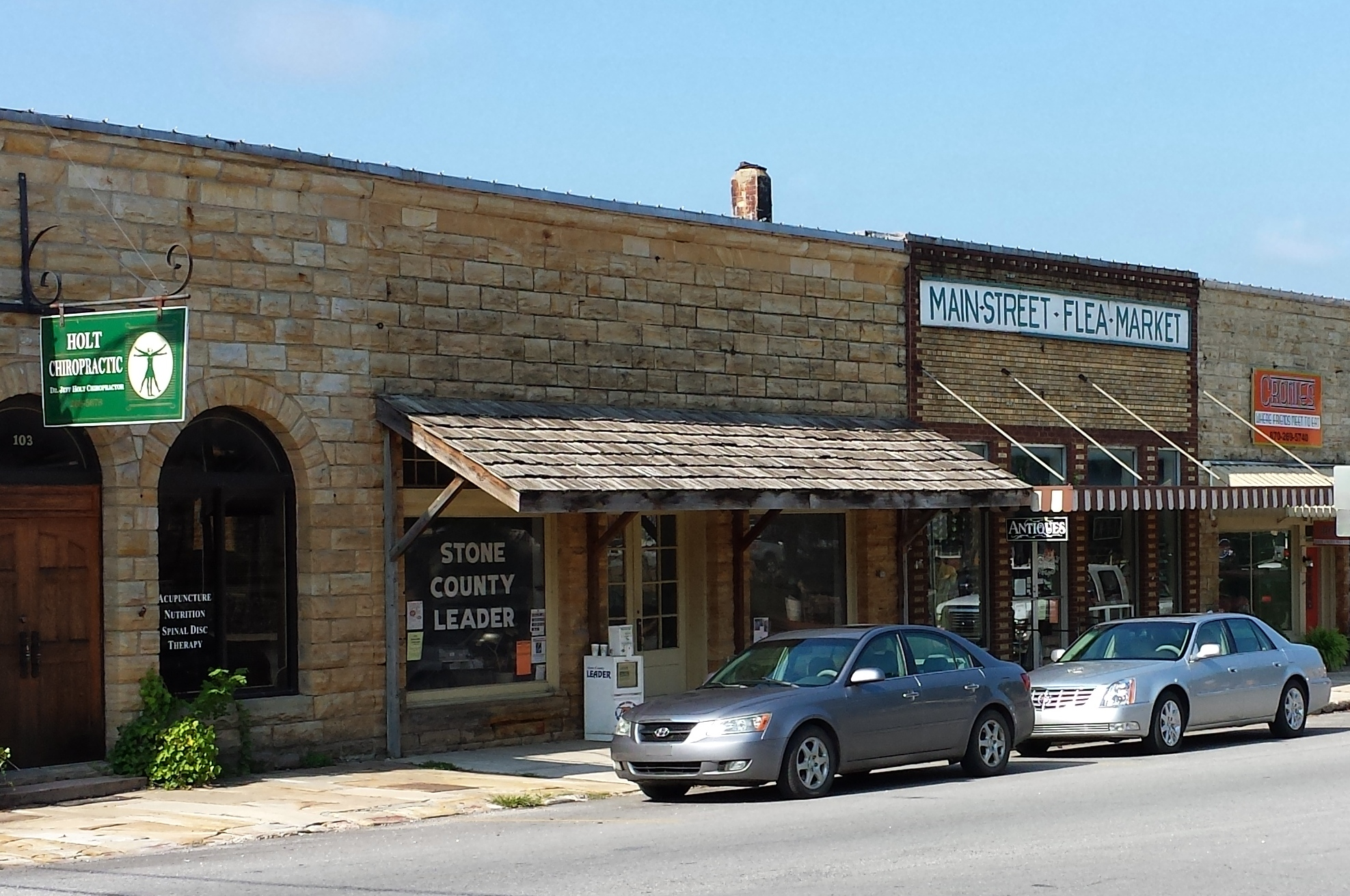

- Location within Arkansas Location within the United States
- Location: AR 66, Mountain View, Arkansas
- Coordinates: 35°52′6″N 92°7′5″W
- Area: less than one acre
- Built: 1926
- Architect: Brewer Bros.
- Architectural style: Rectangular plan
- MPS: Stone County MRA
- NRHP reference No.: 85002241
- Added to NRHP: September 17, 1985

The Stegall General Store is a historic commercial building on Arkansas Highway 66 in the center of Mountain View, Arkansas. It is a single-story stone structure, set on the south side of the courthouse square, and has two plate glass windows flanking a central double-door entrance. The store was built in 1926, during the city's second phase of stone construction in its center.

The building was listed on the National Register of Historic Places in 1985.

== See also ==
- National Register of Historic Places listings in Stone County, Arkansas
