= Fred Lancaster Barn =

- U.S. National Register of Historic Places
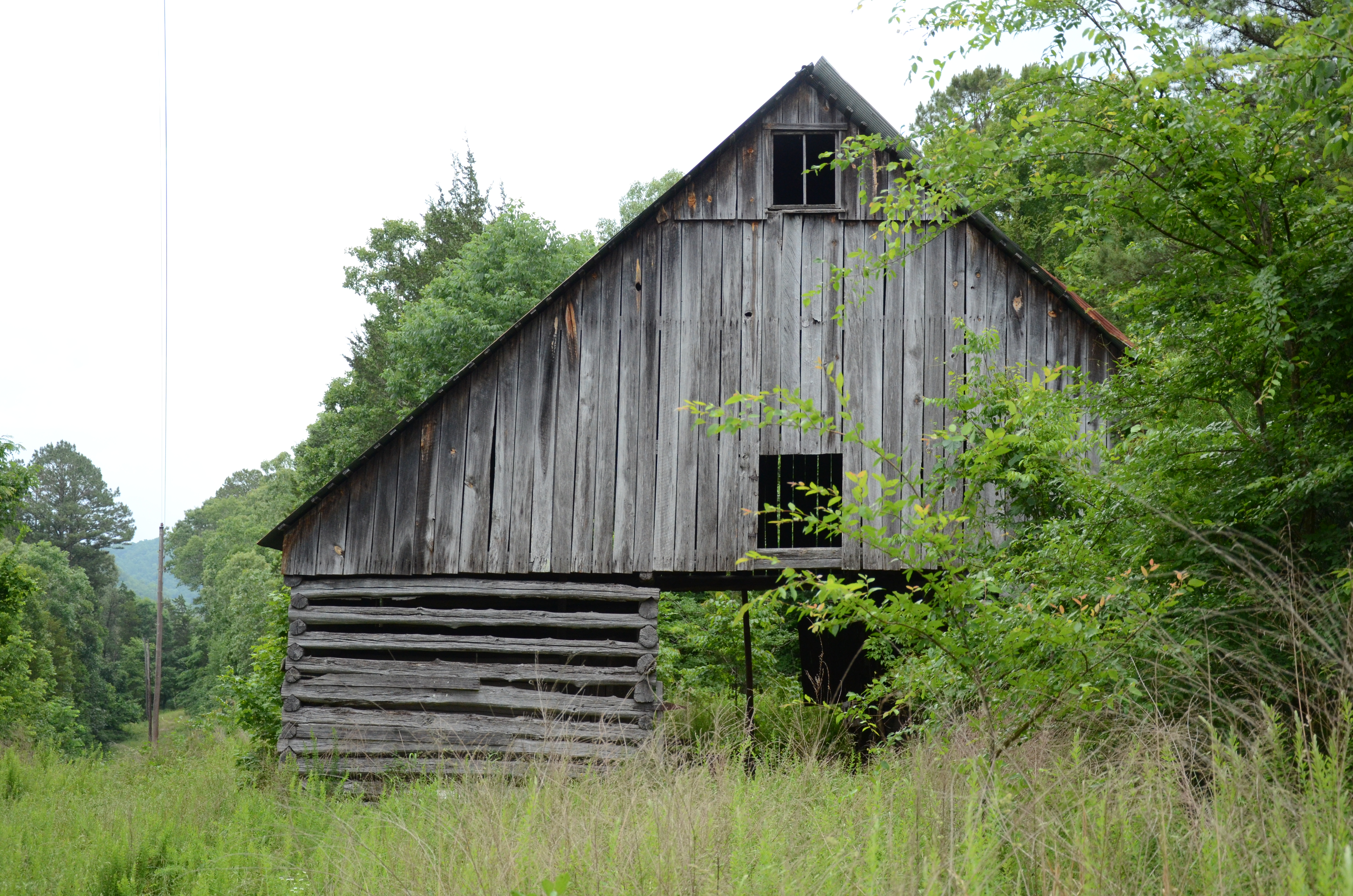

- Location within Arkansas Location within the United States
- Location: Near the White River, Round Bottom, Arkansas
- Coordinates: 35°56′19″N 92°2′45″W
- Area: less than one acre
- Built: 1918
- Architectural style: Four Crib plan
- MPS: Stone County MRA
- NRHP reference No.: 85002213
- Added to NRHP: September 17, 1985

The Fred Lancaster Barn is a historic barn in rural eastern Stone County, Arkansas. It is located in the Round Bottom area northeast of Mountain View. It is a traditional-format four-crib log structure with a tall gable roof. Each of its cribs measures about 12 by 20 feet (3.7 m × 6.1 m), and are divided by crossing driveways. The barn was built in 1918 by Fred Lancaster, and represents a transition from the traditional style crib barn to one with a transverse layout.

The barn was listed on the National Register of Historic Places in 1985.

== See also ==
- National Register of Historic Places listings in Stone County, Arkansas
