= John Avey Barn =

- U.S. National Register of Historic Places
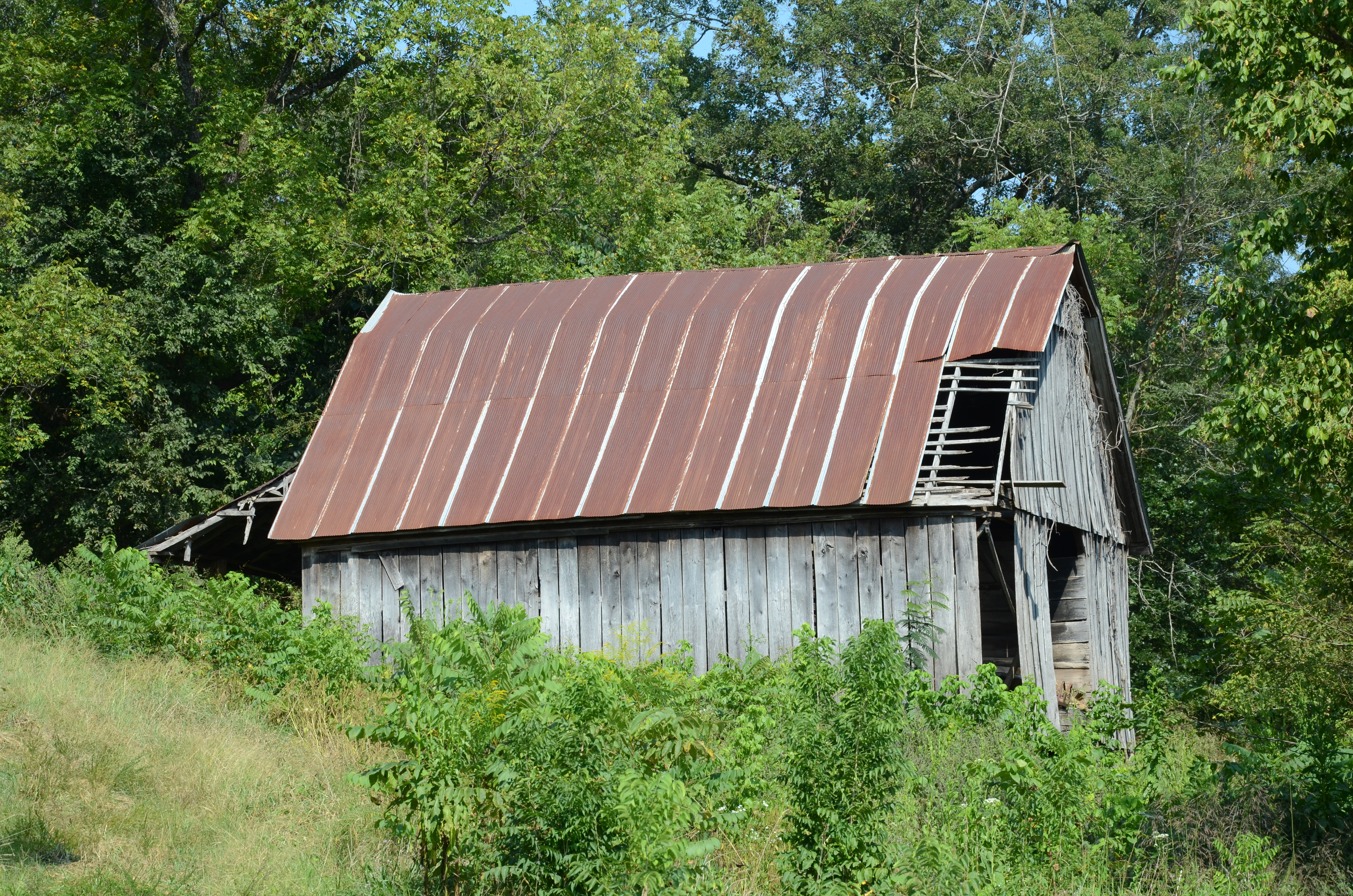

- Location within Arkansas Location within the United States
- Location: Stone County Road 87, Big Springs, Arkansas
- Coordinates: 35°53′56″N 92°16′3″W
- Area: less than one acre
- Built: 1906
- Architectural style: Bank Barn plan
- MPS: Stone County MRA
- NRHP reference No.: 85002219
- Added to NRHP: September 17, 1985

The John Avey Barn is a historic barn in rural western Stone County, Arkansas. It is located in the hamlet of Big Springs, on the north side of County Road 87 near the junction with Rosebud Road. It is a gambrel-roofed timber-frame structure, with vertical board siding. Built in 1906, it is the only documented bank barn in the county, with ground-level entrances on both levels. The southern end provides access to the lower level, while the upper level is accessed via an entrance on the north end.

The barn was listed on the National Register of Historic Places in 1985.

== See also ==
- National Register of Historic Places listings in Stone County, Arkansas
