= Noah McCarn House =

Historic house in Arkansas, United States

- U.S. National Register of Historic Places
- Location within Arkansas Location within the United States
- Nearest city: Mountain View, Arkansas
- Coordinates: 35°49′16″N 92°2′27″W
- Area: less than one acre
- Built: 1920
- Architectural style: Bungalow/craftsman
- MPS: Stone County MRA
- NRHP reference No.: 85002238
- Added to NRHP: September 17, 1985

The Noah McCarn House is a historic house on Arkansas Highway 5, about 3 miles (4.8 km) southeast of Mountain View, Arkansas. It is a single-story wood-frame structure, with a side gable roof, weatherboard siding, and a stone foundation. The main facade has a center entrance, with paired sash windows on either side, and is sheltered by a hip-roof porch supported by square posts. The roof lines exhibit a vernacular Craftsman version of exposed rafter ends and brackets. A wellhouse on the property has distinctive latticework walls.

The house was listed on the National Register of Historic Places in 1985.

== See also ==
- National Register of Historic Places listings in Stone County, Arkansas
