= Fox Pictograph =

Archaeological site in Arkansas, United States

- U.S. National Register of Historic Places
- Nearest city: Fox, Arkansas
- Area: 0.1 acres (0.040 ha)
- MPS: Rock Art Sites in Arkansas TR
- NRHP reference No.: 82002143
- Added to NRHP: May 4, 1982

The Fox Pictograph is a prehistoric rock art site in Stone County, Arkansas. Located near the community of Fox, it is one of two documented examples of rock art depicting humans in the state. It is a stick figure, painted in red pigment, with an unusual depiction of ear ornaments. The figure is about 127 centimetres (50 in) in height.

The site was listed on the National Register of Historic Places in 1982.

== See also ==
- National Register of Historic Places listings in Stone County, Arkansas
