= Wesley Copeland House =

Historic house in Arkansas, United States

- U.S. National Register of Historic Places
- Location within Arkansas Location within the United States
- Nearest city: Timbo, Arkansas
- Coordinates: 35°51′11″N 92°18′25″W
- Area: less than one acre
- Built: 1858
- Architect: Copeland, Wesley
- Architectural style: Dogtrot Plan
- MPS: Stone County MRA
- NRHP reference No.: 85002208
- Added to NRHP: September 17, 1985

The Wesley Copeland House is a historic house in rural western Stone County, Arkansas. Located on the north side of a rural road south of Timbo, it is single-story dogtrot log house, finished in weatherboard and topped by a gable roof that overhangs the front porch. The porch is supported by chamfered square posts, and there is a decorative sawtooth element at its cornice. There are two chimneys, one a hewn stone structure at the western end, and a cut stone structure at the eastern end. Built c. 1858, it is a rare antebellum house in the county, and a well-preserved example of traditional architecture.

The house was listed on the National Register of Historic Places in 1985.

== See also ==
- National Register of Historic Places listings in Stone County, Arkansas
