= William Dillard Homestead =

Historic house in Arkansas, United States

- U.S. National Register of Historic Places
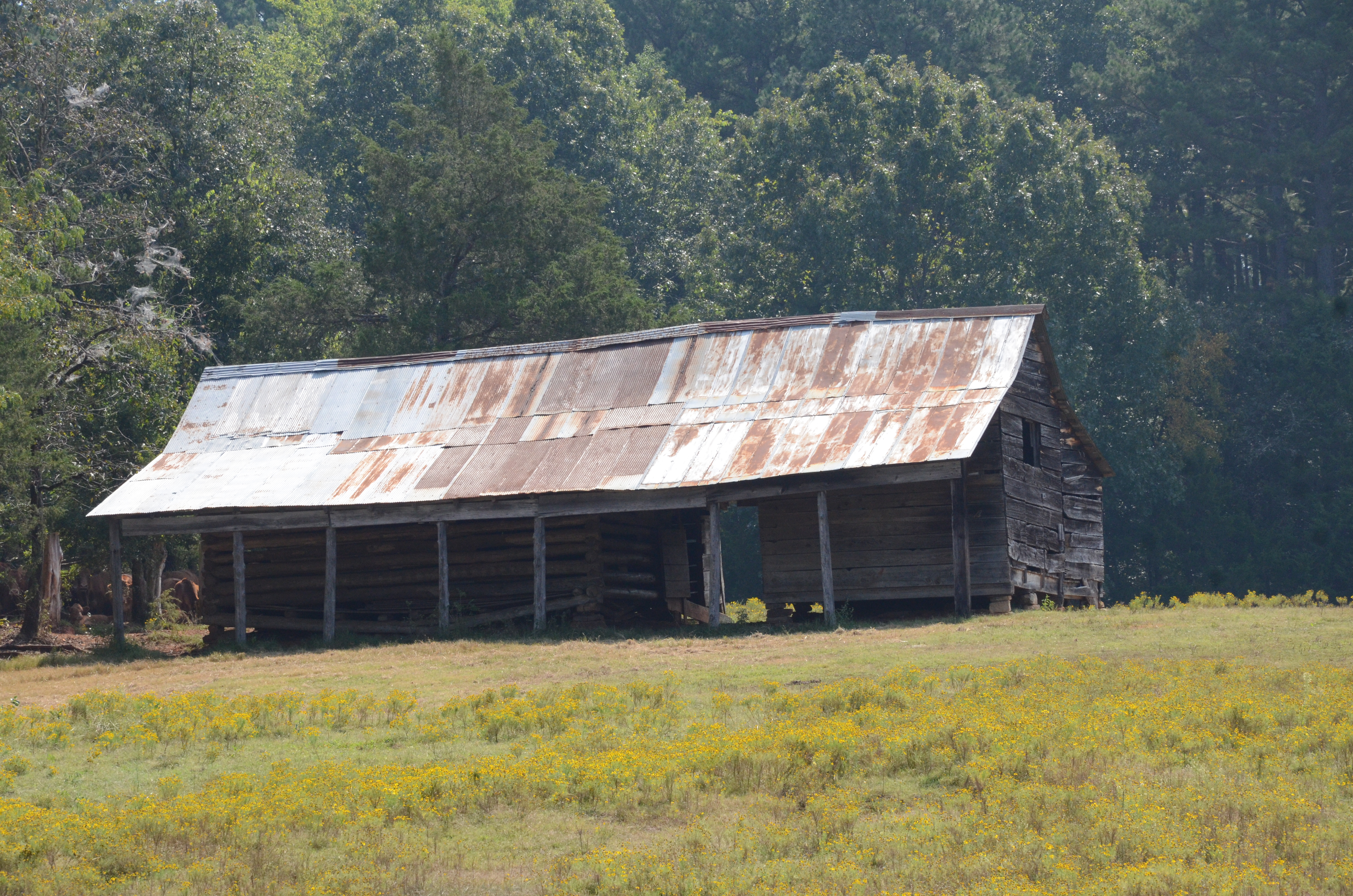

- Location within Arkansas Location within the United States
- Location: Near the White River, Round Bottom, Arkansas
- Coordinates: 35°56′0″N 92°2′4″W
- Area: less than one acre
- Built: 1837
- Architect: William Dillard
- Architectural style: Single Pen
- MPS: Stone County MRA
- NRHP reference No.: 85002214
- Added to NRHP: September 17, 1985

The William Dillard Homestead is a historic homestead property in rural northeastern Stone County, Arkansas. It is located on the Round Bottom area northeast of Mountain View, on a plateau above the river's flood plain. It consists of two log structures, both now used as barns, that were built c. 1837, and are the oldest standing structures in the county. A single-pen log cabin stands on rough stone piers, and is covered by a gable roof. The walls are rough-hewn logs, joined by V notches. A shed-roof ell extends on the southern side of the structure, and more modern box-constructed sheds are attached to the north and east sides. A double crib barn stands across the road from the cabin.

The property was listed on the National Register of Historic Places in 1985.

== See also ==
- National Register of Historic Places listings in Stone County, Arkansas
