= Bonds House (Fox, Arkansas) =

Historic house in Arkansas, United States

- U.S. National Register of Historic Places
- Location within Arkansas Location within the United States
- Nearest city: Fox, Arkansas
- Coordinates: 35°46′17″N 92°20′43″W
- Area: less than one acre
- Built by: Joe Moody
- Architectural style: Dogtrot
- MPS: Stone County MRA
- NRHP reference No.: 91000691
- Added to NRHP: February 3, 1992

The Bonds House is a historic farmstead complex in rural southwestern Stone County, Arkansas. It is located southwest of Fox, northeast of the junction of county roads 2 and 4. The main house is a single-story dogtrot house, with two pens flanking a breezeway under the gable roof. A shed-roof porch extends across the front facade. The house is finished with horizontal planking under the porch, and weatherboard elsewhere. The breezeway has been enclosed, but the original stairs giving access to the attic space has been retained. The property includes two historic outbuildings, as well as several more modern structures, and a stretch of period road. The house was built about 1900, and is one of Stone County's best-preserved dogtrots. It was built by Joe Moody, who grew up in the area, but was owned for many years by the Bonds family.

The property was listed on the National Register of Historic Places in 1992.

== See also ==
- National Register of Historic Places listings in Stone County, Arkansas
