= Dew Drop Inn (Mountain View, Arkansas) =

- The Inn At Mountain View
- U.S. National Register of Historic Places
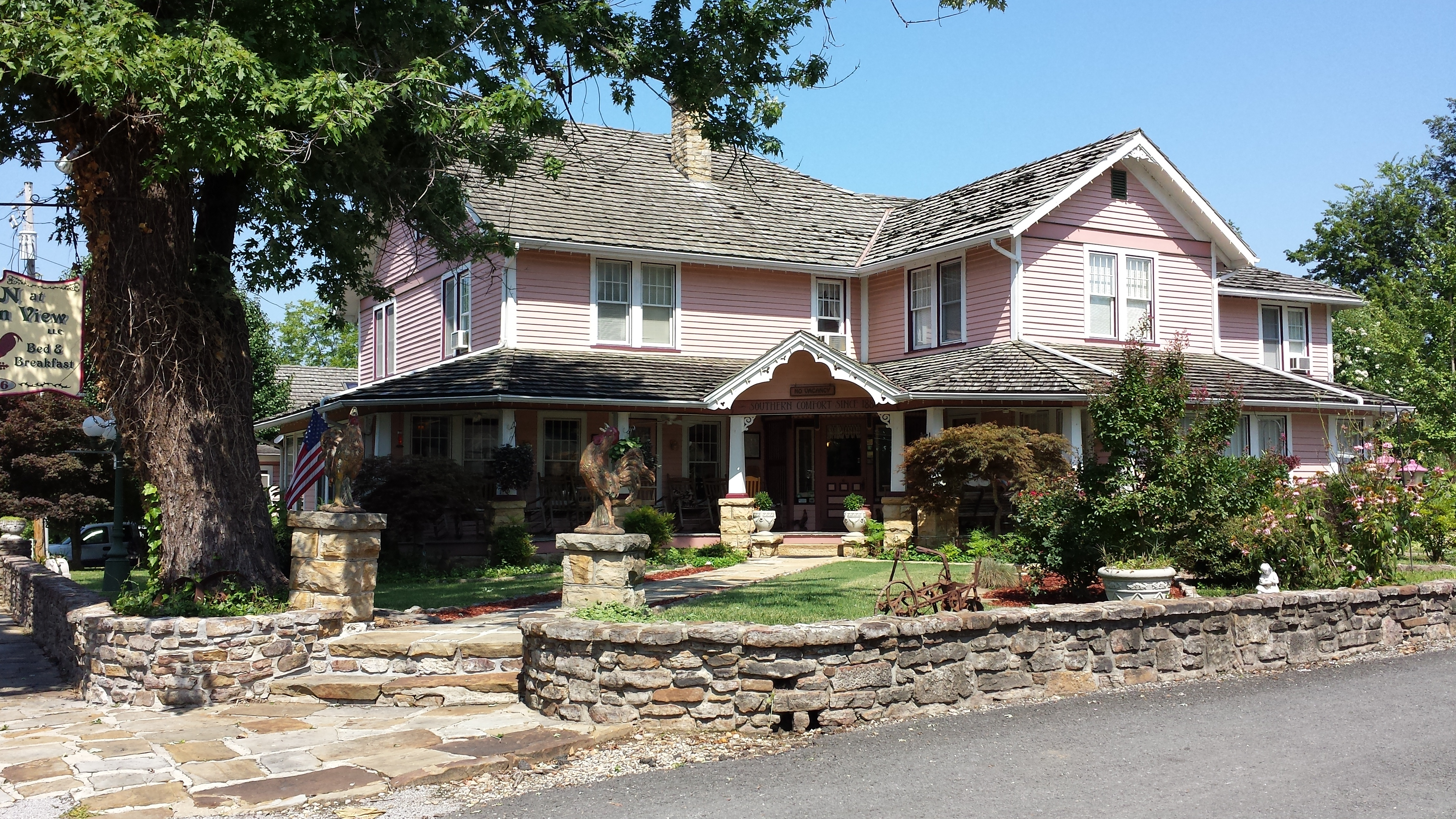

- Location within Arkansas Location within the United States
- Location: 307 W. Washington St., Mountain View, Arkansas
- Coordinates: 35°52′10″N 92°7′13″W
- Area: less than one acre
- Built: 1886
- MPS: Stone County MRA
- NRHP reference No.: 85002231
- Added to NRHP: September 17, 1985

The Inn at Mountain View, formerly the Dew Drop Inn, is a historic hotel property, which now serves as a true bed & breakfast at 307 West Washington Street in Mountain View, Arkansas. It is a 2 1/2-story wood-frame structure, roughly in a T shape, with a cross-gable roof configuration. A single-story porch wraps around one portion of the T, supported by square posts mounted on dressed stone pedestals. Built c. 1920, it is one of two hotel buildings to survive from that period in the city. A large country breakfast is served for guests daily. The front porch contains 10 rocking chairs that face the park where the musicians gather for jams.

The building was listed on the National Register of Historic Places in 1985.

== See also ==
- National Register of Historic Places listings in Stone County, Arkansas
