= Onia, Arkansas =

Unincorporated community in Arkansas, US

Coordinates: 35°55′08″N 92°19′38″W

Onia is an unincorporated community in Stone County, Arkansas, United States. It has an estimated population of approximately 30 civilians. The ZIP Code for Onia is 72663.

The only landmarks in Onia are Bethany Baptist Church, and the U.S. post office in the center of the settlement.

== Notable person ==
- Thomas Lavy, farmer charged with terrorism in 1993
