= Pleasant Grove, Stone County, Arkansas =

Pleasant Grove, Arkansas
- Census-designated place
- Location within Arkansas Location within the United States
- Coordinates: 35°48′59″N 91°54′34″W
- Country: United States
- State: Arkansas
- County: Stone
- Elevation: 463 ft (141 m)

Population (2020)
  - Total: 235
- Time zone: UTC-6 (Central (CST))
  - Summer (DST): UTC-5 (CDT)
- ZIP code: 72567
- Area code: 870
- GNIS feature ID: 2805677

Pleasant Grove is an unincorporated community and census-designated place (CDP) in Stone County, Arkansas, United States. It was first listed as a CDP in the 2020 census with a population of 235. Pleasant Grove is located along Arkansas Highway 14, 12.5 miles (20.1 km) east-southeast of Mountain View. Pleasant Grove has a post office with ZIP code 72567.

== Demographics ==
=== 2020 census ===
Pleasant Grove CDP, Arkansas – Demographic Profile (NH = Non-Hispanic) Note: the US Census treats Hispanic/Latino as an ethnic category. This table excludes Latinos from the racial categories and assigns them to a separate category. Hispanics/Latinos may be of any race.
Race / Ethnicity	Pop 2020	% 2020
White alone (NH)	222	94.47%
Black or African American alone (NH)	1	0.43%
Native American or Alaska Native alone (NH)	1	0.43%
Asian alone (NH)	0	0.00%
Pacific Islander alone (NH)	1	0.43%
Some Other Race alone (NH)	0	0.00%
Mixed Race/Multi-Racial (NH)	7	2.98%
Hispanic or Latino (any race)	3	1.28%
Total	235	100.00%
