= Stone County Courthouse (Arkansas) =

- U.S. National Register of Historic Places
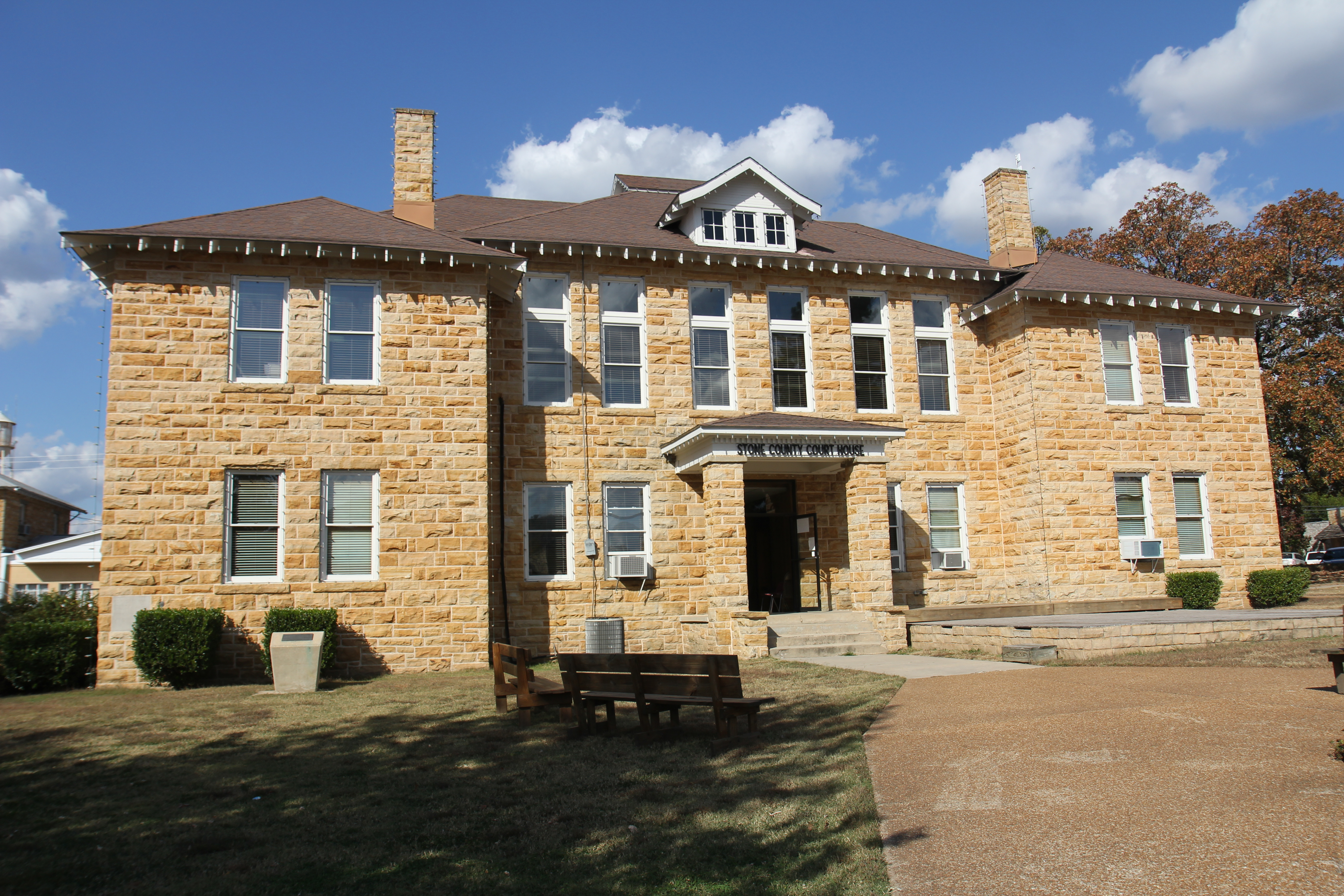
- Front view of Courthouse

- Location within Arkansas Location within the United States
- Location: Courthouse Sq., Mountain View, Arkansas
- Coordinates: 35°52′8″N 92°7′5″W
- Area: less than one acre
- Built: 1922
- Architect: Clyde A. Ferrell
- NRHP reference No.: 76000470
- Added to NRHP: September 29, 1976

The Stone County Courthouse is located at Courthouse Square in the center of Mountain View, the county seat of Stone County, Arkansas. It is a 2 1/2-story stone structure, built from native stone, featuring a hip roof with exposed rafter ends. The building has a central section flanked by slightly projecting wings, with the entrance at the center. The center is sheltered by a portico that has a hip roof, a dentillated cornice, and square stone posts. The courthouse was designed by Clyde A. Ferrell and constructed in 1922.

The building was listed on the National Register of Historic Places in 1976.

== See also ==
- National Register of Historic Places listings in Stone County, Arkansas
