= Marcella, Arkansas =

- Unincorporated community
- Location within Arkansas Location within the United States
- Coordinates: 35°47′17″N 91°53′02″W
- Country: United States
- State: Arkansas
- County: Stone
- Elevation: 417 ft (127 m)
- Time zone: UTC-6 (Central (CST))
  - Summer (DST): UTC-5 (CDT)
- ZIP code: 72555
- Area code: 870
- GNIS feature ID: 58122

Marcella is an unincorporated community in Stone County, Arkansas, United States. Marcella is located along Arkansas Highway 14, 14.5 miles (23.3 km) east-southeast of Mountain View. Marcella has a post office with ZIP code 72555.

== History ==
Marcella was called Wallace Creek back in the 1830s. At that time Stone county was part Izard county.

Note: Izard county, Arkansas Territory was established 27 Oct 1825 from Independence county, Arkansas Territory.

Note: Arkansas Territory was established 1828 from Missouri Territory and the Cherokee Nation Tract & Reservation land.

Note: Arkansas the 25th state was established 15 June 1836 from Arkansas Territory, including Oklahoma.

Note: Baxter county, Arkansas was established 24 March 1873 from Fulton, Izard, Searcy and Marion county's, Arkansas.

Note: Stone county, Arkansas was established 21 April 1873 from Izard, Searcy, Independence and Van Buren county's, Arkansas.
