= Eros School Building =

- U.S. National Register of Historic Places
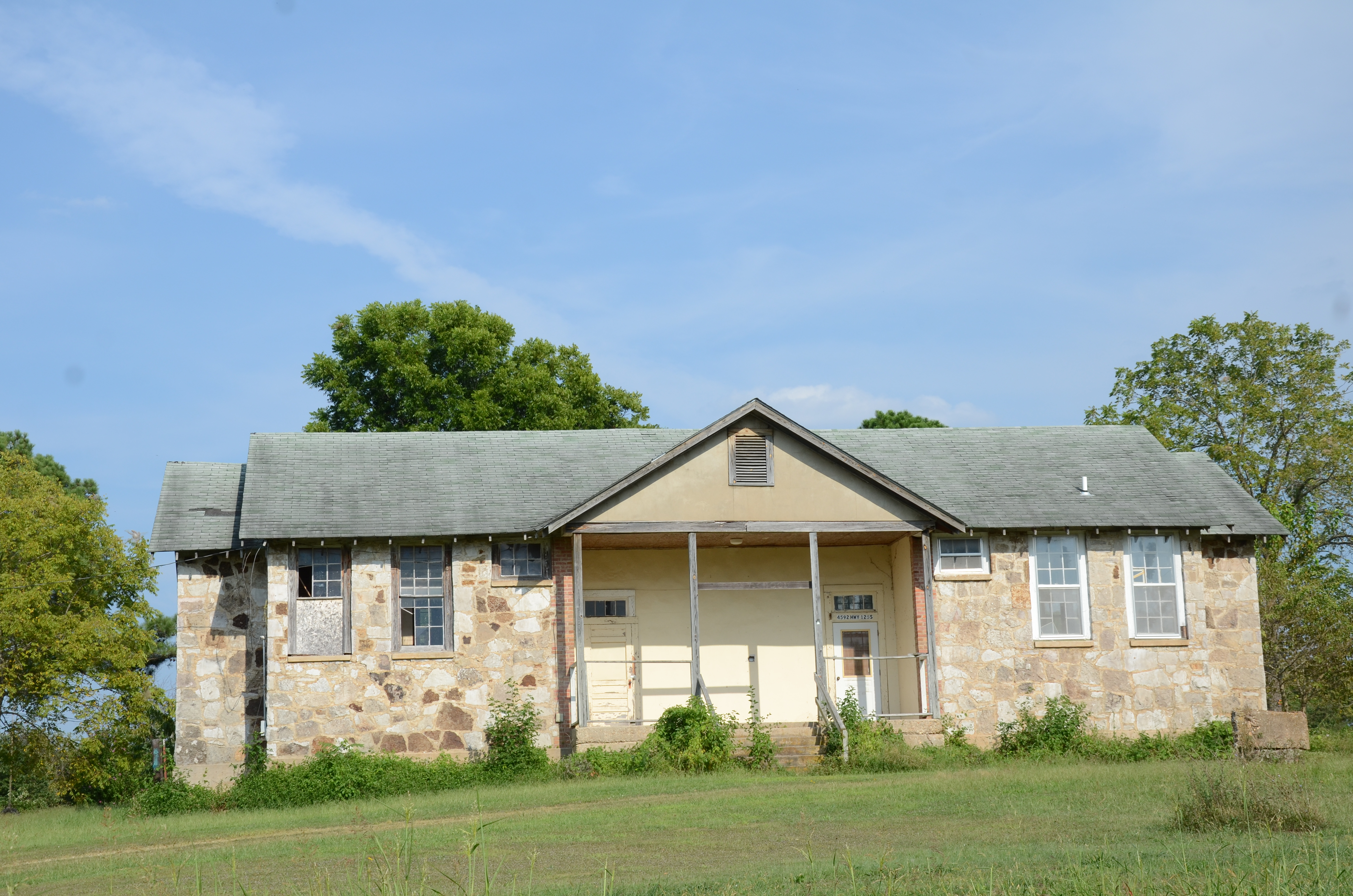

- Location within Arkansas Location within the United States
- Location: Eros, Arkansas
- Coordinates: 36°10′58″N 92°51′0″W
- Area: less than one acre
- Architectural style: Bungalow/craftsman, Plain Traditional
- MPS: Public Schools in the Ozarks MPS
- NRHP reference No.: 92001110
- Added to NRHP: September 4, 1992

The Eros School Building is a historic school building in the small rural community of Eros, Arkansas, at the junction of Arkansas Highway 125 and Marion County Road 4018. It is a single-story Plain Tradition stone structure, with a Craftsman-style side-gable roof with exposed rafter tails. A gable-topped porch projects from the main (west-facing), supported by slender columns on a concrete base. The porch pediment, like those on the sides, is stuccoed. The school was built in 1935 as part of a Depression-era jobs program.

The building was listed on the National Register of Historic Places in 1992.

== See also ==
- National Register of Historic Places listings in Marion County, Arkansas
