= Eros, Arkansas =

Unincorporated community in Arkansas, US

Coordinates: 36°11′00″N 92°51′03″W

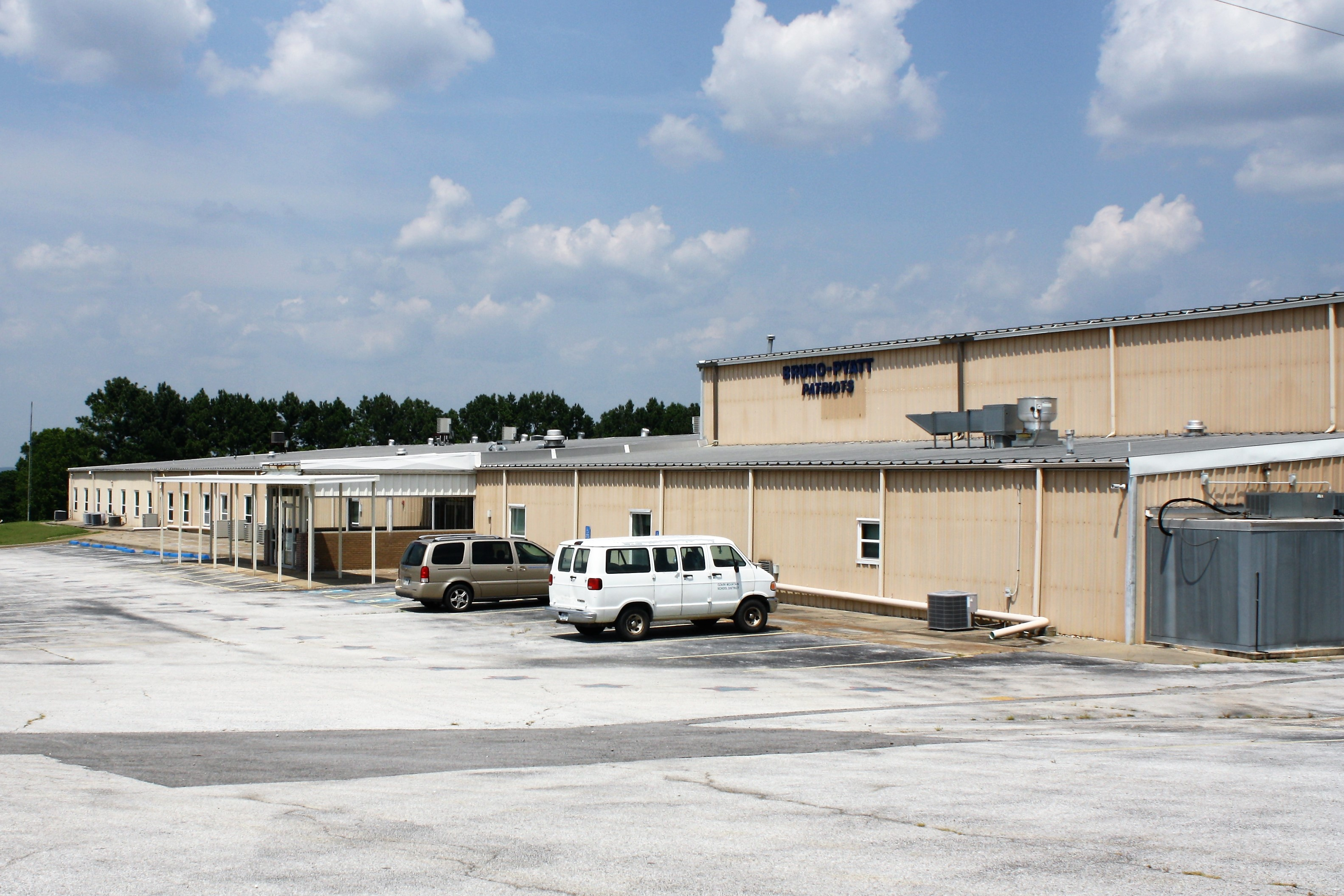
Bruno-Pyatt Elementary School (also had the former Bruno-Pyatt High School) in Eros

Eros is an unincorporated community in southwestern Marion County, Arkansas, United States. The community is located on Arkansas Highway 125, south of Pyatt.

== Education ==
Public education is available from the Ozark Mountain School District, which operates Bruno-Pyatt Elementary School and Ozark Mountain High School. Bruno-Pyatt Elementary School is located in Eros. The latter is located in the former Western Grove High School, which consolidated into Ozark Mountain High in 2023.

The Bruno-Pyatt School was created in 1974 as a consolidation of schools in Bruno and Pyatt. On July 1, 2004, the former Bruno-Pyatt School District consolidated into the Ozark Mountain School District. The consolidated district operated Bruno–Pyatt High School until 2023, when it consolidated into Ozark Mountain High School.
