= Bull Shoals, Arkansas =

- City
- Location in Marion County, Arkansas
- Coordinates: 36°22′58″N 92°34′59″W
- Country: United States
- State: Arkansas
- County: Marion

Area
  - Total: 4.97 sq mi (12.87 km^{2})
  - Land: 4.90 sq mi (12.70 km^{2})
  - Water: 0.069 sq mi (0.18 km^{2})
- Elevation: 558 ft (170 m)

Population (2020)
  - Total: 1,952
  - Estimate (2025): 1,888 ▼
  - Density: 398.2/sq mi (153.74/km^{2})
- Time zone: UTC-6 (Central (CST))
  - Summer (DST): UTC-5 (CDT)
- ZIP code: 72619
- Area code: 870
- FIPS code: 05-09790
- GNIS feature ID: 2403951
- Website: www.cityofbullshoals.gov

Bull Shoals is a city in Marion County, Arkansas, United States, founded in 1954. The population was 1,952 at the 2020 census. Primarily a retirement and vacation center, Bull Shoals is bordered in three directions by the clear, deep, man-made Bull Shoals Lake.

== History ==
The town was created by real estate developers C. S. Woods and C. S. Woods Jr. and was officially established in 1954. Bull Shoals Dam is the threshold into the town from the southeast.

Bull Shoals Dam and the town of Bull Shoals developed together. The developers bought several tracts of the former Newton Flat settlement when they learned that the government planned to build a flood-control and power-generating concrete dam at the site. Construction of the dam took four years, from 1947 to 1951, resulting in one of the largest dams built in the nation at that time.

== Geography ==
Bull Shoals is located in northeastern Marion County and is bordered on three sides by Bull Shoals Lake, with the main channel of the lake, on the White River, to the southeast and northeast, and a long arm of the lake formed by the inlets of Jimmie Creek and Moccasin Creek on the northwest side of the city. The southeast border of the city, in the White River, is the Baxter County line.

According to the United States Census Bureau, the city has a total area of 5.0 square miles (13 km^{2}), of which 0.07 square miles (0.18 km^{2}), or 1.39%, are water.

Highway 178 is the only highway and only major road in and out of Bull Shoals, which the highway enters just off the Bull Shoal Dam, which begins the Bull Shoals Lake from the White River, near the Arkansas-Missouri border. Highway 178 leads east 9 miles (14 km) to Midway and south the same distance to Flippin. Yellville, the Marion county seat, is 15 miles (24 km) to the southwest of Bull Shoals, and Mountain Home is 15 miles to the southeast.

== Demographics ==
Historical population
| Census | Pop. | Note | %± |
|---|---|---|---|
| 1960 | 268 | | — |
| 1970 | 430 | | 60.4% |
| 1980 | 1,312 | | 205.1% |
| 1990 | 1,534 | | 16.9% |
| 2000 | 2,000 | | 30.4% |
| 2010 | 1,950 | | −2.5% |
| 2020 | 1,952 | | 0.1% |
| 2025 (est.) | 1,888 | ▼ | −3.3% |
U.S. Decennial Census; 2014 Estimate

=== 2020 census ===
Bull Shoals racial composition
| Race | Number | Percentage |
|---|---|---|
| White (non-Hispanic) | 1,779 | 91.14% |
| Black or African American (non-Hispanic) | 5 | 0.26% |
| Native American | 9 | 0.46% |
| Asian | 8 | 0.41% |
| Other/Mixed | 96 | 4.92% |
| Hispanic or Latino | 55 | 2.82% |

As of the 2020 census, Bull Shoals had a population of 1,952. The median age was 60.3 years. 13.7% of residents were under the age of 18 and 39.4% of residents were 65 years of age or older. For every 100 females there were 100.2 males, and for every 100 females age 18 and over there were 98.7 males age 18 and over.

0.0% of residents lived in urban areas, while 100.0% lived in rural areas.

There were 993 households and 572 families in Bull Shoals, of which 14.7% had children under the age of 18 living in them. Of all households, 45.1% were married-couple households, 24.5% were households with a male householder and no spouse or partner present, and 24.2% were households with a female householder and no spouse or partner present. About 38.2% of all households were made up of individuals and 21.7% had someone living alone who was 65 years of age or older.

There were 1,219 housing units, of which 18.5% were vacant. The homeowner vacancy rate was 2.2% and the rental vacancy rate was 11.1%.

=== 2010 census ===
As of the census of 2010, there were 1,950 people, 1,014 households, and 650 families residing in the city. The population density was 403.0 inhabitants per square mile (155.6/km^{2}). There were 1,226 housing units at an average density of 247.0 per square mile (95.4/km^{2}). The racial makeup of the city was 98.05% White, 0.30% Black or African American, 0.45% Native American, 0.25% Asian, 0.10% Pacific Islander, 0.10% from other races, and 0.75% from two or more races. 1.05% of the population were Hispanic or Latino of any race.

There were 1,014 households, out of which 11.6% had children under the age of 18 living with them, 57.4% were married couples living together, 5.1% had a female householder with no husband present, and 35.8% were non-families. 32.1% of all households were made up of individuals, and 20.9% had someone living alone who was 65 years of age or older. The average household size was 1.96 and the average family size was 2.39.

In the city, the population was spread out, with 11.6% under the age of 18, 4.2% from 18 to 24, 16.1% from 25 to 44, 30.0% from 45 to 64, and 38.3% who were 65 years of age or older. The median age was 59 years. For every 100 females, there were 91.8 males. For every 100 females age 18 and over, there were 90.2 males.

The median income for a household in the city was $27,139, and the median income for a family was $34,219. Males had a median income of $23,125 versus $16,950 for females. The per capita income for the city was $17,636. About 9.1% of families and 12.6% of the population were below the poverty line, including 27.2% of those under age 18 and 9.3% of those age 65 or over.

== Education ==
Students from Bull Shoals attend the Flippin School District, which operates Flippin High School.

== Culture ==
Bull Shoals has been honored as an Arkansas Volunteer Community of the Year for five years.

Liquidforce and Brostock 2010 chose Bull Shoals as the location of their professional wakeboarding tournament in July 2010 and June 2011. Surf the Bull, an annual grassroots wakesurfing event and competition, is hosted by Bull Shoals Lake Boat Dock and presented by several members of the wakesurfing community every summer in late July/early August. The lake has also hosted numerous professional bass and walleye fishing tournaments over the years. Additionally, the city co-hosts the annual HillBilly Chili Cookoff selecting Arkansas' Best Chili to compete internationally in the International Chili Society competitions.

== Government ==
Bull Shoals has a mayor/council form of government with six council members. The current mayor of Bull Shoals is Bill Stahlman. The previous mayor was Michael Savu.

Incoming District 17 Arkansas State Senator Scott Flippo is a businessman in Bull Shoals but resides in his native Mountain Home.

== Notable people ==
- Loren P. Thompson, Minnesota state legislator and resort owner, lived in Bull Shoals; Thompson also served as mayor of Bull Shoals.
