= Bruno–Pyatt High School =

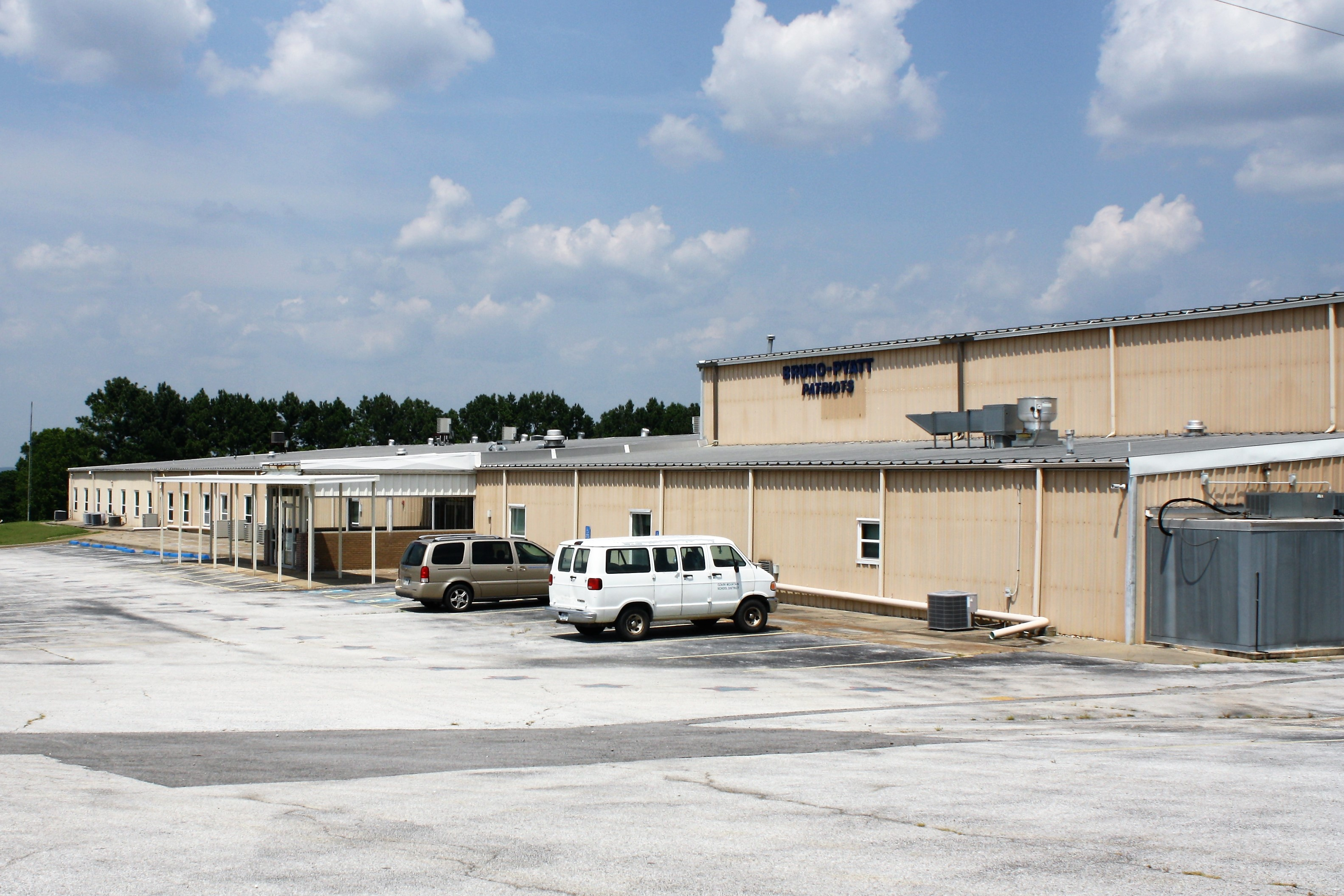

Location
- 4754 AR 125 South; Everton postal address, Arkansas 72633; United States
- 36°12′48″N 92°51′46″W

Information
- School type: Public (government funded)
- Status: Open
- School district: Ozark Mountain School District (2004-2023); Bruno–Pyatt School District (1974-2004)
- NCES District ID: 0500076
- Authority: Arkansas Department of Education (ADE)
- CEEB code: 040305
- NCES School ID: 050007600686
- Grades: 7–12
- Enrollment: 126 (2010–11)
- Student to teacher ratio: 9.47
- Education system: ADE Smart Core curriculum
- Colors: Red, white, and blue
- Athletics conference: 1A East (2012–14)
- Mascot: Patriot
- Team name: Bruno–Pyatt Patriots
- Communities served: Bruno, Pyatt, Eros
- Feeder schools: Bruno–Pyatt Elementary School
- Affiliation: Arkansas Activities Association
- Website: brunopyattpublicschool.com

Bruno–Pyatt High School was a comprehensive public high school serving students in grades seven through twelve in the remote, rural community of Eros, in unincorporated Marion County, Arkansas, United States, with an Everton postal address. It was the one of three high schools administered by the Ozark Mountain School District and the district's only high school in Marion County, Arkansas while supporting the rural communities of Bruno, Pyatt, and Eros.

It was formerly a part of the Bruno-Pyatt School District. On July 1, 2004, it consolidated into the Ozark Mountain School District.

== History ==
In 1969 the State of Arkansas enacted the Quality Education Act, which was to require schools to merge into others that attained a classification of "A" by 1979. This and other factors resulted in the Bruno and Pyatt schools consolidating. The Rural School District No. 1 held a referendum for a bond valued at $300,000 for the consolidated school. 381 people voted in favor of it, and 142 people voted in opposition. The bond passed, so the school was to be built. Groundbreaking for the consolidated school occurred in 1973. The consolidated school, with a planned capacity of about 250-300 students in grades K-12, was to have nine of its rooms for secondary use. The Bruno-Pyatt School was created in 1974 as a consolidation of schools in Bruno and Pyatt.

It was in the Bruno-Pyatt School District until 2004, when that district consolidated into the Ozark Mountain School District.

In February 2023, Bruno–Pyatt High School had 75 students for both middle and high school levels. That year, it consolidated into Ozark Mountain High School, located on the former Western Grove High School site. The school district's board and the Arkansas Board of Education approved the consolidation. Bruno-Pyatt Elementary School remains in operation.

== Academics ==
This Title I school was accredited by the Arkansas Department of Education (ADE). The assumed course of study followed the Smart Core curriculum developed the Arkansas Department of Education (ADE), which requires students to complete 22 credit units before graduation. Students engaged in regular (core) and career focus courses and exams and may select Advanced Placement (AP) coursework and exams that may lead to college credit.

In 2005, a Bruno–Pyatt teacher was presented with the Rural Teacher of the Year Award by the Arkansas Rural Education Association.

== Athletics ==
The Bruno–Pyatt High School mascot and athletic emblem was the American Patriot with patriotic school colors of red, white and blue. The Bruno–Pyatt Patriots participated in various interscholastic activities in the 1A West Conference administered by the Arkansas Activities Association. The school athletic activities included basketball (boys/girls), cheer, golf (boys/girls), baseball, and softball.

== See also ==
- Bruno School Building
