= Bruno-Pyatt =

Bruno-Pyatt may refer to:

- Bruno–Pyatt High School, in Marion County, Arkansas
- Bruno-Pyatt School District, a defunct school district in Marion County, Arkansas
