= Peel, Arkansas =

- Unincorporated community
- Location within Arkansas Location within the United States
- Coordinates: 36°25′56″N 92°46′08″W
- Country: United States
- State: Arkansas
- County: Marion
- Elevation: 938 ft (286 m)
- Time zone: UTC-6 (Central (CST))
  - Summer (DST): UTC-5 (CDT)
- ZIP code: 72668
- Area code: 870
- GNIS feature ID: 77972

Peel is an unincorporated community in northwest Marion County, Arkansas, United States. Peel is located on Arkansas Highway 125, 8 miles (13 km) east of Lead Hill. Peel has a post office with ZIP code 72668. Bull Shoals Lake on the White River lies just to the north and east of the community.

== 2024 Earthquakes ==
On January 4th and 5th 2024 four earthquakes were reported just to the southeast of the community. The strongest registered 2.5 on the Richter scale.
