= Arkansas Highway 235 =

State highway in Arkansas, United States

Highway 235

Route information
- Maintained by ArDOT
- Length: 19.73 mi (31.75 km)

Major junctions
- South end: US 65, Pindall
- AR 125
- North end: AR 14, Yellville

Location
- Country: United States
- State: Arkansas
- Counties: Marion, Searcy

Highway system
- Arkansas Highway System; Interstate; US; State; Business; Spurs; Suffixed; Scenic; Heritage
← AR 234	→ AR 236

Arkansas Highway 235 (AR 235 and Hwy. 235) is a north–south state highway in north central Arkansas. The route of 19.73 miles (31.75 km) runs from US 65 in Pindall north through to Highway 14 in south Yellville.

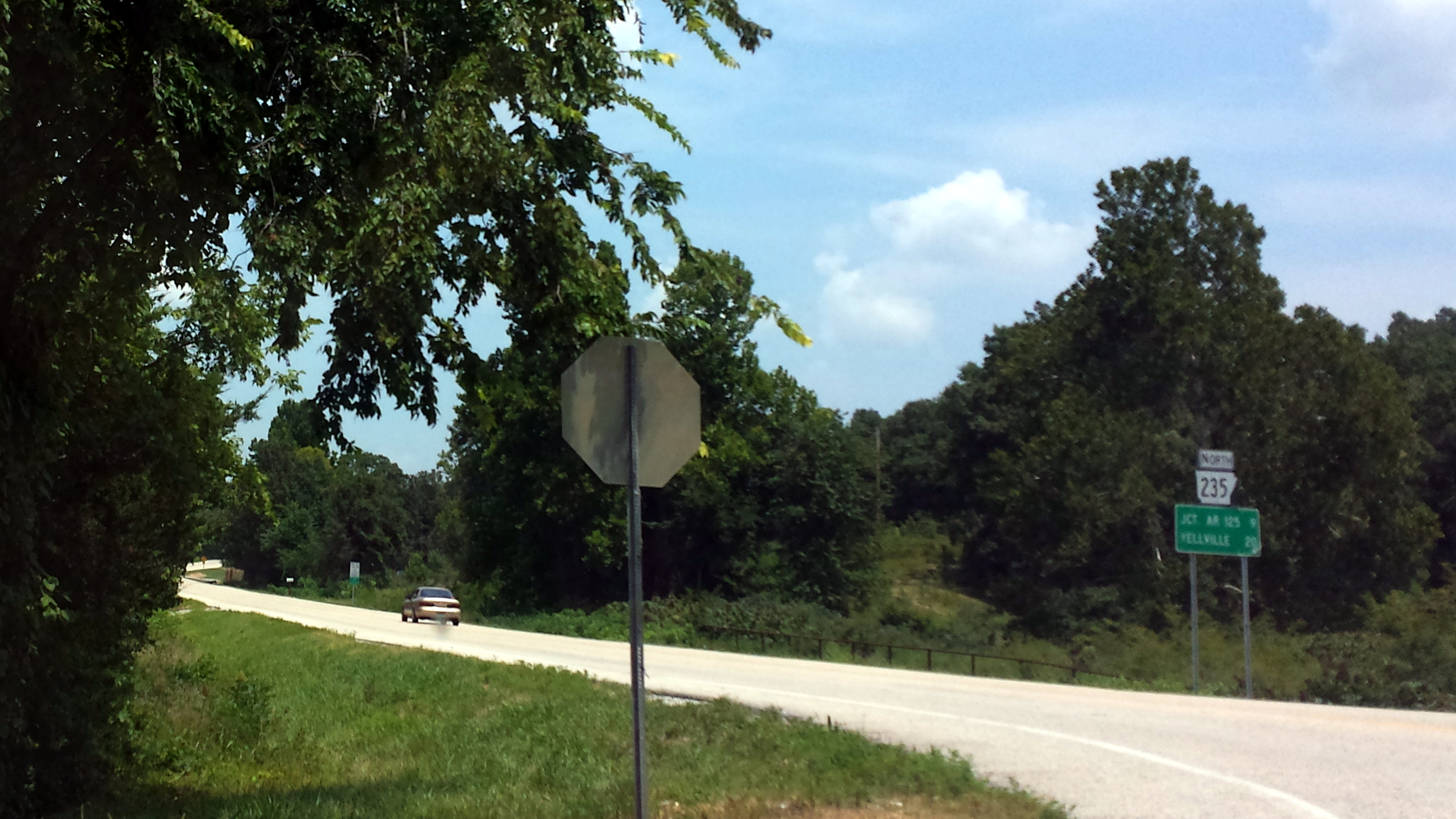
Highway 235 near the Highway 65 intersection

== Route description ==
The route begins at U.S. Route 65 near Pindall and runs northeast into Marion County. The highway serves Verona and has a junction with Highway 125 before entering Bruno. Highway 235 has a spur route in Bruno which runs south through the unincorporated community. The route continues northeast to Arkansas Highway 14 in Yellville, where the route terminates.

== Major intersections ==
County	Location	mi	km	Destinations	Notes
Searcy	Pindall	0.00	0.00	US 65 – Marshall, Harrison	southern terminus
Marion		8.80	14.16	AR 125 north – Eros	
Marion	Bruno	10.81	17.40	AR 235S south	
Marion	Yellville	19.73	31.75	AR 14 – Yellville, Harriet	northern terminus
1.000 mi = 1.609 km; 1.000 km = 0.621 mi

== Bruno spur route ==
Highway 235S
- Location: Bruno
- Length: 0.31 mi (500 m)
- Existed: 1978–present

Arkansas Highway 235 Spur is a spur route in Bruno. It is 0.31 miles (0.50 km) in length. The highway connects four National Register of Historic Places listings to the state highway system: Aggie Hall, Aggie Workshop, the Bruno School Building, and Hirst-Mathew Hall.

=== Major intersections ===
The entire route is in Bruno, Marion County.

mi	km	Destinations	Notes
0.00	0.00	AR 235	northern terminus
0.31	0.50	CR 510	southern terminus
1.000 mi = 1.609 km; 1.000 km = 0.621 mi

== See also ==
- List of state highways in Arkansas
