= Pea Ridge School Building =

- U.S. National Register of Historic Places
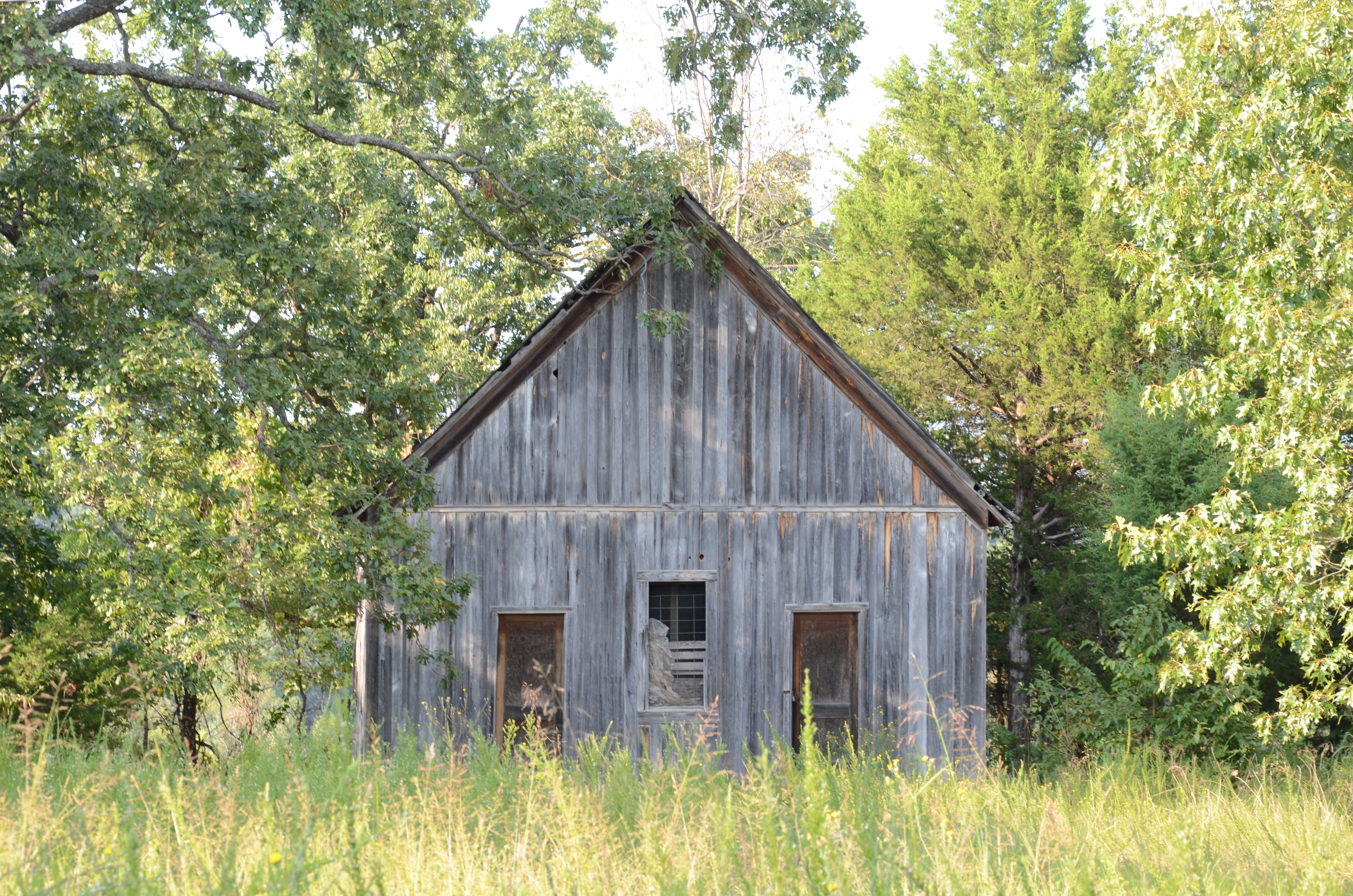

- Location within Arkansas Location within the United States
- Nearest city: Bruno, Arkansas
- Coordinates: 36°5′41″N 92°45′24″W
- Area: 2 acres (0.81 ha)
- Built: 1899
- Architectural style: Vernacular, Plain Traditional
- NRHP reference No.: 93000486
- Added to NRHP: June 8, 1993

The Pea Ridge School Building is a historic schoolhouse in rural southern Marion County, Arkansas. It is located on the north side of County Road 5008, about 4 miles (6.4 km) south of Bruno. It is a single-story wood-frame structure, with a gable roof, board and batten siding, and a stone foundation. The main facade faces west, and has a pair of doorways with a sash window between. The interior is finished in horizontal boards, those on the east painted black to provide a blackboard. Built c. 1899, it is one of Marion County's least-altered one-room schoolhouses, having only lost its belfry when the tin roof was installed in the 1920s.

The building was listed on the National Register of Historic Places in 1993.

== See also ==
- National Register of Historic Places listings in Marion County, Arkansas
