= Bruno, Arkansas =

Unincorporated community in Arkansas, US

Coordinates: 36°08′39″N 92°46′42″W

Bruno is an unincorporated community in southwest Marion County, Arkansas, United States. Yellville lies approximately eight miles to the northeast along Arkansas Route 235.

The community is the location of five places listed on the National Register of Historic Places:

- Aggie Hall, on County Road 9
- Aggie Workshop, AR 235 Spur
- Bruno School Building, Co. Rd. 9
- Hirst-Mathew Hall, AR 235 Spur
- Pea Ridge School Building, east of Co. Rd. 6, approximately 4 mi. south of Bruno

== Education ==
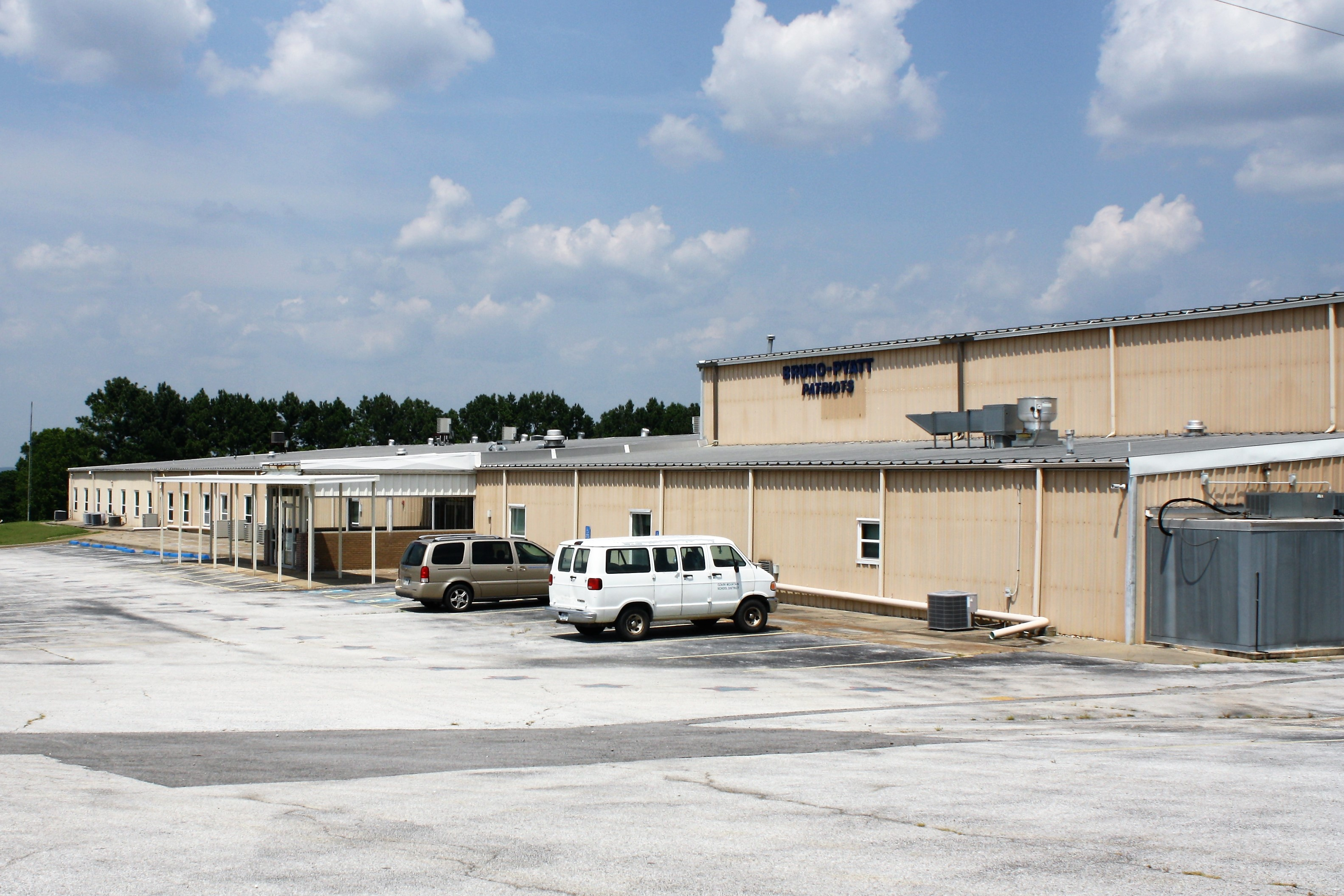
Bruno-Pyatt Elementary School (also had the former Bruno-Pyatt High School) in Eros

Public education is available from the Ozark Mountain School District that includes Bruno-Pyatt Elementary School and Ozark Mountain High School. The latter is located in the former Western Grove High School, which consolidated into Ozark Mountain High in 2023.

The Bruno-Pyatt School was created in 1974 as a consolidation of schools in Bruno and Pyatt. On July 1, 2004, the former Bruno-Pyatt School District consolidated into the Ozark Mountain School District. The consolidated district operated Bruno–Pyatt High School until 2023, when it consolidated into Ozark Mountain High School.
