= Aggie Workshop =

- U.S. National Register of Historic Places
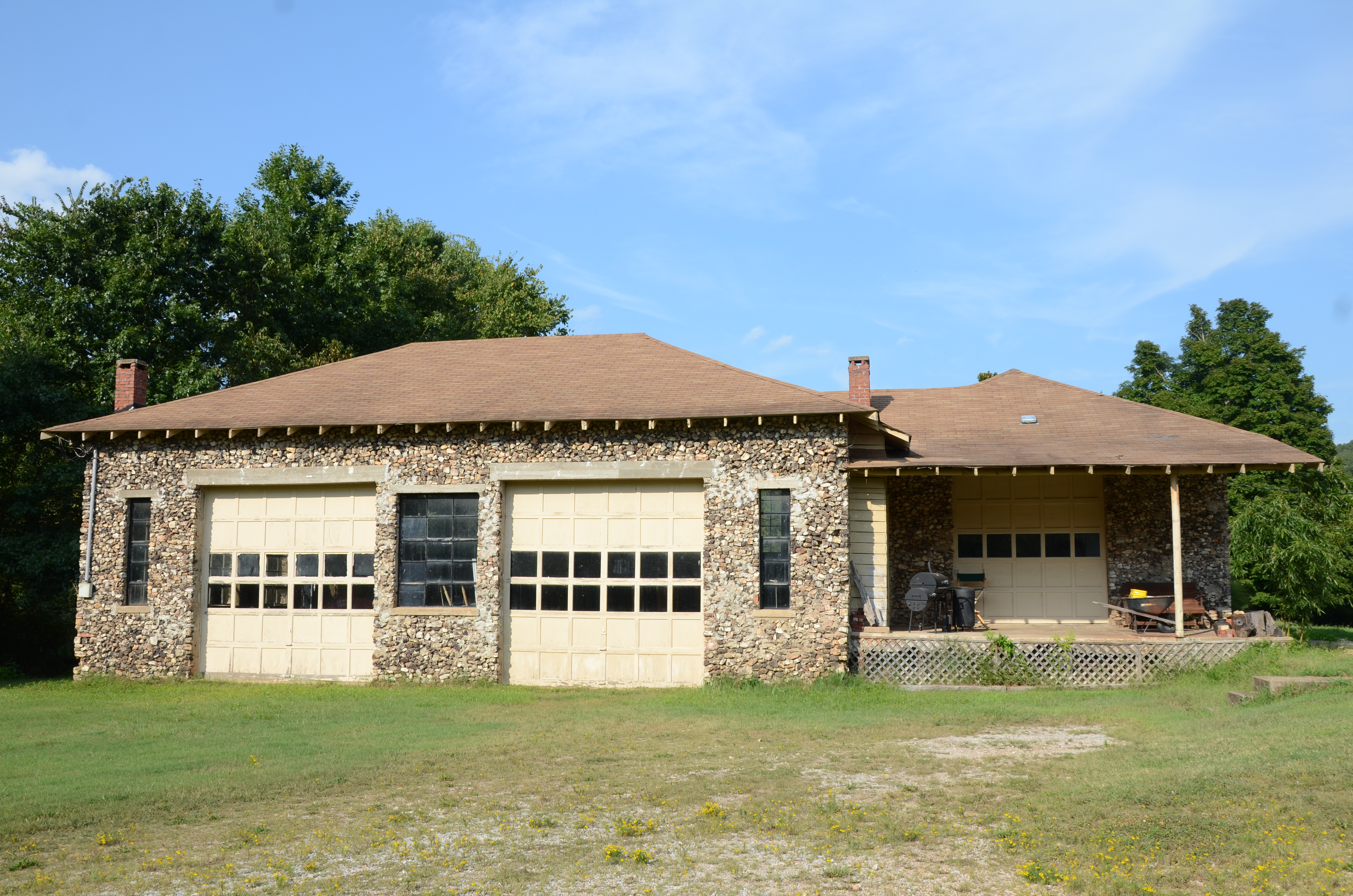

- Location within Arkansas Location within the United States
- Location: AR 235 Spur, Bruno, Arkansas
- Coordinates: 36°8′32″N 92°46′51″W
- Area: 2.3 acres (0.93 ha)
- Built by: Smith-Hughes Aggie Boys
- Architectural style: Bungalow/craftsman, plain traditional
- MPS: Public Schools in the Ozarks MPS
- NRHP reference No.: 92001113
- Added to NRHP: September 4, 1992

The Aggie Workshop is a historic former school building on Marion County Road 5010 in Bruno, Arkansas. It is a single-story L-shaped structure, built out of local stone and topped by a hip roof with Craftsman-style exposed rafter tails. The WPA-approved building was built in 1935 by the Lincoln Aggie Club and was used as a vocational stone and cement workshop, as part of the local Bruno Agricultural School. A cement swimming pool, contemporaneous to the building's construction, is located in the crook of the L.

The building was listed on the National Register of Historic Places in 1992, at which time it was used for storage. It is located just north of Aggie Hall.

== Lincoln Aggie Club ==
The Lincoln Aggie Club was organized in 1923 by a local teacher. It later became a chapter of the Future Farmers of America, the oldest chapter in Arkansas and one of the oldest in the nation (Arkansas was the second state to get an FFA charter, after Virginia.). The members of the club built a workshop, Aggie Hall (a community recreation center), and Aggie Workshop.

== See also ==
- Aggie Hall: 1926 Bruno Agricultural School gymnasium
- Bruno School Building: 1920 Bruno Agricultura School main building
- Hirst-Mathew Hall: 1929 Bruno Agricultural School classrooms
- National Register of Historic Places listings in Marion County, Arkansas
