= Kenny Saylors =

American basketball player

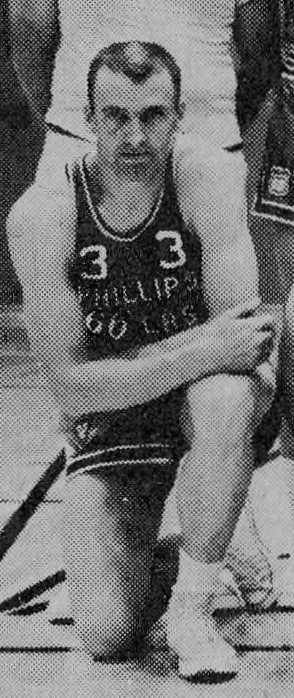
- Saylors, c. 1963

Personal information
- Born: Luber, Arkansas, U.S.
- Listed height: 6 ft 5 in (1.96 m)

Career information
- High school: Bruno–Pyatt (Everton, Arkansas)
- College: Arkansas Tech (1959–1963)
- NBA draft: 1963: 2nd round, 17th overall pick
- Drafted by: St. Louis Hawks
- Position: Forward

Career highlights
- 4× All-AIC Team (1960–1963)
- Stats at Basketball Reference

Kenneth Saylors is an American former basketball player. He played at Bruno–Pyatt High School in Everton, Arkansas, where he had his No. 33 jersey retired. Saylors played college basketball for the Arkansas Polytechnic College Wonder Boys and is the program's all-time leading scorer with 2,470 career points. He also holds records for single-season points scored with 831 and career free throws made with 578. Saylors is the only Wonder Boys player to be named an All-Arkansas Intercollegiate Conference (AIC) selection four times.

Saylors was selected as the 17th overall pick in the 1963 NBA draft by the St. Louis Hawks but never played in the National Basketball Association (NBA). He played for the Phillips 66ers from 1963 to 1965. Saylors also played for the Milwaukee Zips. After his retirement from playing, he became a basketball official for high school and college games.

Saylors was inducted into the Arkansas Officials Hall of Fame in 2005, the Tech Hall of Distinction in 2008 and the Arkansas Sports Hall of Fame in 2009.
