= Pyatt, Arkansas =

- Town
- Old cabins in Pyatt

- Location in Marion County, Arkansas
- Coordinates: 36°15′03″N 92°50′40″W
- Country: United States
- State: Arkansas
- County: Marion

Area
  - Total: 1.29 sq mi (3.33 km^{2})
  - Land: 1.25 sq mi (3.25 km^{2})
  - Water: 0.027 sq mi (0.07 km^{2})
- Elevation: 742 ft (226 m)

Population (2020)
  - Total: 181
  - Estimate (2025): 192 ▲
  - Density: 144.1/sq mi (55.62/km^{2})
- Time zone: UTC-6 (Central (CST))
  - Summer (DST): UTC-5 (CDT)
- ZIP code: 72672
- Area code: 870
- FIPS code: 05-57890
- GNIS feature ID: 2407167
- Website: www.pyatt.net

Pyatt is a town in western Marion County, Arkansas, United States. The population was 181 at the 2020 census, down from 221 in 2010.

== Geography ==
Pyatt is located in western Marion County in the valley of Crooked Creek, an east-flowing tributary of the White River.

U.S. Routes 412 and 62 pass through the southern part of the town, leading east 10 miles (16 km) to Yellville, the county seat, and west 17 miles (27 km) to Harrison.

According to the United States Census Bureau, Pyatt has a total area of 1.3 square miles (3.4 km^{2}), of which 0.03 square miles (0.08 km^{2}), or 2.18%, are water.

=== List of highways ===
- US 62/US 412
- U.S. Route 62 Spur
- Highway 125

== Demographics ==
Historical population
Census	Pop.	Note	%±
1930	254		—
1940	224		−11.8%
1950	257		14.7%
1960	144		−44.0%
1970	137		−4.9%
1980	217		58.4%
1990	185		−14.7%
2000	253		36.8%
2010	221		−12.6%
2020	181		−18.1%
2025 (est.)	192	▲	6.1%
U.S. Decennial Census

As of the census of 2000, there were 253 people, 97 households, and 62 families residing in the town. The population density was 198.3 inhabitants per square mile (76.6/km^{2}). There were 119 housing units at an average density of 93.3 per square mile (36.0/km^{2}). The racial makeup of the town was 98.81% White, 0.40% Black or African American, 0.40% Native American and 0.40% Pacific Islander. 0.40% of the population were Hispanic or Latino of any race.

There were 97 households, out of which 40.2% had children under the age of 18 living with them, 55.7% were married couples living together, 4.1% had a female householder with no husband present, and 35.1% were non-families. 34.0% of all households were made up of individuals, and 18.6% had someone living alone who was 65 years of age or older. The average household size was 2.61 and the average family size was 3.35.

In the town, the population was spread out, with 33.2% under the age of 18, 7.9% from 18 to 24, 28.9% from 25 to 44, 17.0% from 45 to 64, and 13.0% who were 65 years of age or older. The median age was 30 years. For every 100 females, there were 97.7 males. For every 100 females age 18 and over, there were 103.6 males.

The median income for a household in the town was $19,583, and the median income for a family was $26,250. Males had a median income of $22,321 versus $18,214 for females. The per capita income for the town was $8,633. About 10.5% of families and 16.7% of the population were below the poverty line, including 12.9% of those under the age of 18 and 20.7% of those 65 or over.

== Education ==
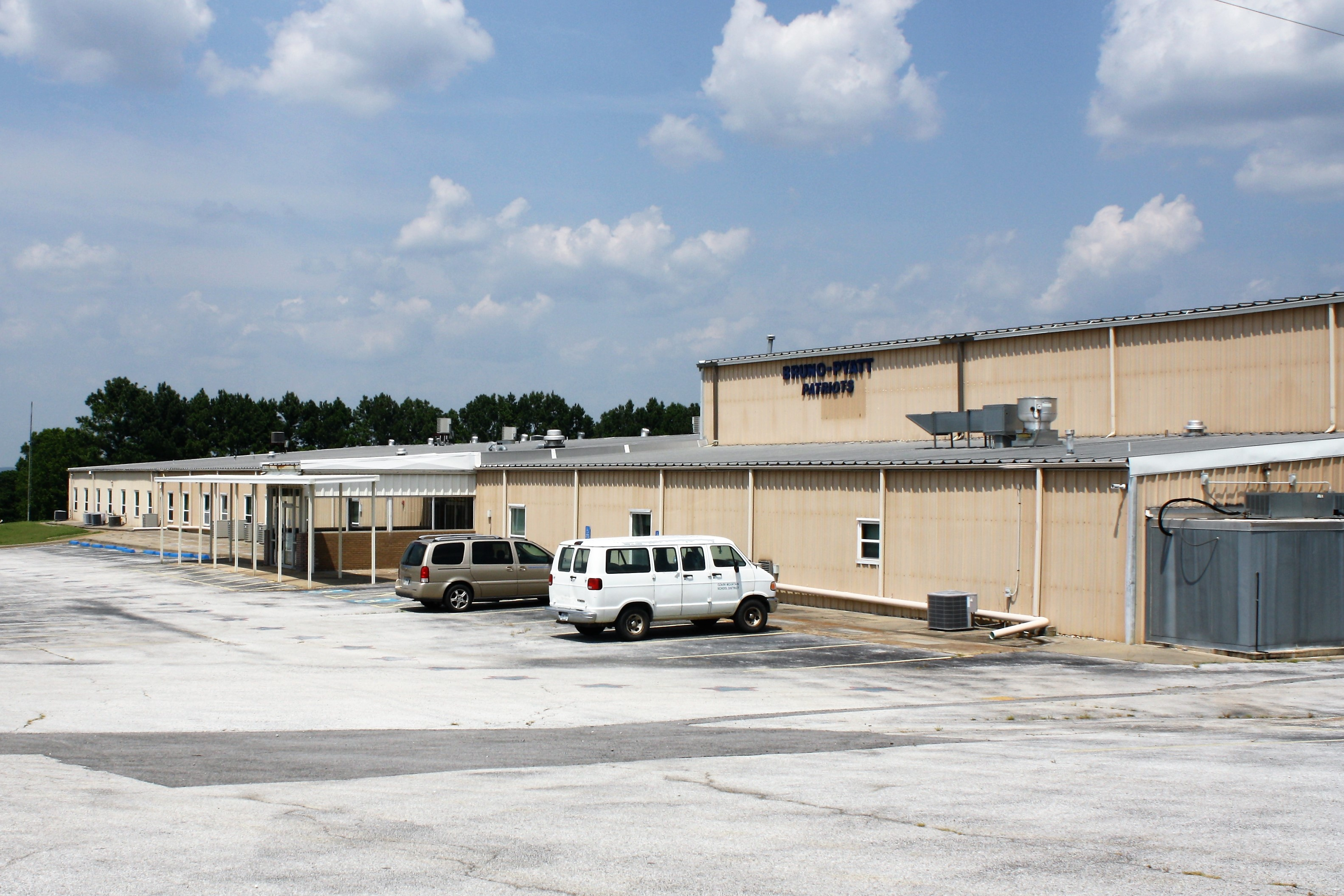
Bruno-Pyatt Elementary School (also had the former Bruno-Pyatt High School) in Eros

Public education is available from the Ozark Mountain School District that includes Bruno-Pyatt Elementary School and Ozark Mountain High School. The latter is located in the former Western Grove High School, which consolidated into Ozark Mountain High in 2023.

The Bruno-Pyatt School was created in 1974 as a consolidation of schools in Bruno and Pyatt. On July 1, 2004, the former Bruno-Pyatt School District consolidated into the Ozark Mountain School District. The consolidated district operated Bruno–Pyatt High School until 2023, when it consolidated into Ozark Mountain High School.
