= Bruno School Building =

- Formerly listed on the U.S. National Register of Historic Places
- Location within Arkansas Location within the United States
- Location: hwy 235, Bruno, Arkansas
- Coordinates: 36°8′32″N 92°46′49″W
- Area: less than one acre
- Architectural style: Bungalow/craftsman, Plain Traditional
- MPS: Public Schools in the Ozarks MPS
- NRHP reference No.: 92001112

Significant dates
- Added to NRHP: September 4, 1992
- Removed from NRHP: January 24, 2017

The Bruno School Building was a historic school building a short way south of Arkansas Highway 235 in Bruno, Arkansas. It was a single story Plain Traditional (vernacular) frame structure, with a gable roof and a front porch with gabled pediment. Built in 1920, it had some Craftsman style influence, including exposed rafter tails and the square columns on stone piers which supported the porch. It was a locally significant well-preserved example of a rural school building.

It was disused circa 1974; the Bruno-Pyatt School (of the Bruno-Pyatt School District, including Bruno-Pyatt High School) was created that year as a consolidation of schools in Bruno and Pyatt.

The building was listed on the National Register of Historic Places in 1992, and was delisted in 2017 after it was torn down. The school complex includes other listed buildings, including Aggie Hall (the gymnasium), and the Aggie Workshop.

== See also ==
- Aggie Hall: 1926 Bruno Agricultural School gymnasium
- Aggie Workshop: 1935 Bruno Agricultural School workshop
- Hirst-Mathew Hall: 1929 Bruno Agricultural School classrooms
- National Register of Historic Places listings in Marion County, Arkansas
