= Arkansas Tech Wonder Boys and Golden Suns =

Arkansas Tech University athletic teams

- University: Arkansas Tech University
- Conference: GAC (primary)
- NCAA: Division II
- Athletic director: Abby Davis
- Location: Russellville, Arkansas
- Varsity teams: 12 (4 men's, 8 women's)
- Football stadium: Thone Stadium at Buerkle Field
- Basketball arena: Tucker Coliseum
- Baseball stadium: Baswell Field
- Softball stadium: Chartwells Women's Sports Complex
- Other venues: Hull Building
- Mascot: Jerry the Bulldog
- Nickname: Wonder Boys (men); Golden Suns (women)
- Colors: Green and gold
- Website: arkansastechsports.com

The Arkansas Tech Wonder Boys and Golden Suns are the athletic teams that represent Arkansas Tech University in Russellville, Arkansas. They are a charter member of the Great American Conference of the NCAA Division II.

== Conference affiliations ==
NAIA

- Arkansas Intercollegiate Conference (1927–1995)

NCAA

- Gulf South Conference (1995–2011)
- Great American Conference (2011–present)

== Sports sponsored ==
Arkansas Tech currently fields 10 sports at the NCAA Division II level.

Men's sports	Women's sports
Baseball	Basketball
Basketball	Cross country
Football	Golf
Golf	Softball
	Tennis
	Track & field
	Volleyball

=== Wonder Boys sports ===
==== Basketball ====
Tech's greatest men's basketball success came under the guidance of head coach Sam Hindsman, who led the Wonder Boys from 1947–66. Hindsman, who also won two AIC football titles at Tech during the 1950s, was ahead of his time with an up-tempo style that dazzled fans and opponents. Hindsman and the Wonder Boys won seven consecutive AIC basketball titles from 1949–55. In 1954 and 1955, Tech reached the semifinals of the NAIA National Tournament. Tech's only other NAIA Final Four berth in men's basketball came in 1995.

In all, Hindsman won 11 conference men's basketball titles and 355 men's basketball games to set school records that are unlikely to ever be eclipsed.

Tech returned to men's basketball prominence for the first time in more than a decade during the 2008–09 season. The Wonder Boys finished 23–9 overall, won their first-ever Gulf South Conference men's basketball title and qualified for the NCAA Division II Tournament in men's basketball for the first time ever. The Wonder Boys defeated Benedict College 63–62 in their first-ever NCAA tournament game on March 14, 2009. Florida Southern ended Tech's season 95–92 in overtime the following evening.

The Wonder Boys won their second consecutive GSC Tournament title in 2010 and they returned to the NCAA Division II Basketball Tournament in both 2010 and 2011, reaching the regional semifinals on both occasions.

Basketball seasons

Coach	Year	Overall	Conference	All-American
R.K. Lindberg	1914–15	4–3	0–0	
Totals		4–3 (.571)	0–0 (–)	
Bill Cowan	1922–23	7–1	0–0	
Totals		7–1 (.875)	0–0 (–)	
E.O. Brown	1923–24	5–2	0–0	
E.O. Brown	1924–25	4–8	0–0	
E.O. Brown	1925–26	1–5	0–0	
E.O. Brown	1926–27	7–8	0–0	
E.O. Brown	1927–28	7–5	4–5	
E.O. Brown	1928–29	8–8	5–7	
E.O. Brown	1929–30	10–3	8–3	
E.O. Brown	1930–31	11–4	7–4	
E.O. Brown	1931–32	9–7	3–5	
E.O. Brown	1932–33	1–4	1–4	
Totals		63–54 (.538)	28–28 (.500)	
Truman McEver	1933–34	6–6	1–5	
Truman McEver	1934–35	5–13	3–9	
Totals		11–19 (.367)	4–14 (.222)	
Henry Hudson	1935–36	6–6	2–6	
Henry Hudson	1936–37	6–8	1–8	
Henry Hudson	1937–38	9–5	5–3	
Henry Hudson	1938–39	5–9	3–8	
Henry Hudson	1939–40	4–16	3–13	
Totals		30–44 (.405)	14–38 (.269)	
Howard Godfrey	1940–41	5–11	5–11	
Totals		5–11 (.313)	5–11 (.313)	
Raymond Burnett	1941–42	7–14	0–0	
Totals		7–14 (.333)	0–0 (–)	
John Tucker	1944–45	14–8	13–3	
John Tucker	1945–46	14–5	8–3	
Totals		28–13 (.683)	21–6 (.778)	
Homer Spragins	1946–47	12–11	6–7	
Totals		12–11 (.522)	6–7 (.462)	
Sam Hindsman	1947–48	12–8	9–7	
Sam Hindsman	1948–49	17–4	13–3 *	
Sam Hindsman	1949–50	25–2 #	18–0 *	
Sam Hindsman	1950–51	24–7 #	16–2 *	
Sam Hindsman	1951–52	25–4 #	17–1 *	
Sam Hindsman	1952–53	24–1 #	16–0 *	E.C. O'Neal
Sam Hindsman	1953–54	28–3 %	16–0 *	E.C. O'Neal
Sam Hindsman	1954–55	29–6 %	16–0 *	Donovan Horn
Sam Hindsman	1955–56	15–9 #	11–5	
Sam Hindsman	1956–57	13–13	0–0	
Sam Hindsman	1957–58	20–5	10–0 *	Ronnie Kennett
Sam Hindsman	1958–59	13–11	0–0	
Sam Hindsman	1959–60	19–6	14–4 *	
Sam Hindsman	1960–61	21–3	16–2 *	J.P. Lovelady
Sam Hindsman	1961–62	20–7	14–4 *	Kenny Saylors
Sam Hindsman	1962–63	19–9 #	11–7	Kenny Saylors
Sam Hindsman	1963–64	17–10	13–5	
Sam Hindsman	1964–65	6–19	5–13	
Sam Hindsman	1965–66	8–19	4–14	
Totals		355–146 (.709)	219–67 (.766)	
Deward Dopson	1966–67	12–14	8–10	
Deward Dopson	1967–68	14–13	11–7	
Deward Dopson	1968–69	19–9	13–5	
Deward Dopson	1969–70	22–10 #	15–3	
Deward Dopson	1970–71	20–5	16–4	
Deward Dopson	1971–72	12–16	12–8	Terry Hankton
Deward Dopson	1972–73	4–22	2–16	
Totals		103–89 (.536)	77–53 (.592)	
Ted Lyons	1973–74	8–20	3–15	
Ted Lyons	1974–75	8–17	4–14	
Ted Lyons	1975–76	4–20	1–17	
Totals		20–57 (.260)	8–46 (.148)	
George Jones	1976–77	11–17	8–10	
George Jones	1977–78	7–16	5–13	
George Jones	1978–79	7–21	4–14	
George Jones	1979–80	13–14	7–11	
George Jones	1980–81	12–15	8–10	
Totals		50–83 (.376)	32–58 (.356)	
Danny Ebbs	1981–82	15–14	9–9	Joe Bob Wise
Danny Ebbs	1982–83	13–14	9–9	
Danny Ebbs	1983–84	1–5	0–0	
Totals		29–33 (.468)	18–18 (.500)	
Wesley White (interim)	1983–84	9–12 (10–17 α)	7–11 (7–11 α)	
Totals		9–12 (.429)	7–11 (.389)	
John Widner	1984–85	22–8	12–6 *	
John Widner	1985–86	9–17	6–14	
John Widner	1986–87	12–14	8–12	
Totals		43–39 (.524)	26–32 (.448)	
Marty Barnes	1987–88	22–11	14–4 *	
Marty Barnes	1988–89	20–12	12–6	Alan Cozart
Marty Barnes	1989–90	24–9	14–4	
Marty Barnes	1990–91	16–15	8–10	Maxie Mathis
Marty Barnes	1991–92	20–12	11–7	Maxie Mathis
Marty Barnes	1992–93	23–10	12–4 *	Maxie Mathis; Eric Burnett
Marty Barnes	1993–94	26–8	13–1 *	Thayer McKinley; David Bevis
Marty Barnes	1994–95	29–6 %	14–2 *	David Bevis
Marty Barnes	1995–96	19–10 #	7–5	Chad Keaster
Marty Barnes	1996–97	14–13	8–4	Bryan Hodges
Marty Barnes	1997–98	9–17	6–6	
Marty Barnes	1998–99	9–17	5–7	
Totals		231–140 (.623)	124–60 (.674)	
Robert Thompson	1999–00	16–10	8–4	
Robert Thompson	2000–01	4–22	2–14	
Robert Thompson	2001–02	12–14	8–8	
Robert Thompson	2002–03	11–16	4–12	
Totals		43–62 (.410)	22–38 (.367)	
Rick McCormick	2003–04	7–20	4–12	
Rick McCormick	2004–05	10–17	3–13	
Rick McCormick	2005–06	11–16	2–14	
Totals		28–53 (.346)	9–39 (.188)	
Mark Downey	2006–07	6–21	1–13	
Mark Downey	2007–08	18–11	8–6	
Mark Downey	2008–09	23–9 #	9–5 *	
Mark Downey	2009–10	30–2 #	13–1 *	Brandon Friedel
Totals		77–43 (.642)	31–25 (.554)	
Doug Karleskint	2010–11	25–6 #	13–1 *	
Doug Karleskint	2011–12	26–6 #	13–3 *	Johnie Davis
Doug Karleskint	2012–13	18–12 #	13–7	
Doug Karleskint	2013–14	21–10 #	15–5 *	
Doug Karleskint	2014–15	18–14 #	11–9 *	
Doug Karleskint	2015–16	15–14	10–12	
Totals		123–62 (.665)	75–37 (.670)	
All-Time; Records		1278–989 (.564)	726–588 (.553)	
% National Tournament Final Four # National Tournament * Conference Champion α Full Season Record

==== Baseball ====
Tech won AIC baseball titles in 1950, 1964, 1976, 1981, 1985, 1988, and 1992. The Wonder Boys captured a share of the GSC West Division baseball crown in 1998. Tech won a school record 44 games in 2014 while winning the Great American Conference championship.

Baseball seasons

Coach	Year	Overall	Conference	All-American
W.A. Isgrig	1912	5–8–1	0–0	
Totals		5–8–1 (.393)	0–0 (–)	
E.H. Shinn	1913	10–4	0–0	
E.H. Shinn	1914	5–9	0–0	
E.H. Shinn	1915	3–2	0–0	
Totals		18–15 (.545)	0–0 (–)	
E.O. Brown	1923	1–4	0–0	
Totals		1–4 (.200)	0–0 (–)	
John Tucker	1940	2–3	0–0	
Totals		2–3 (.400)	0–0 (–)	
Raymond Burnett	1948	10–3	6–2	
Raymond Burnett	1949	9–3	8–2	
Raymond Burnett	1950	13–4	8–1 *	
Raymond Burnett	1951	11–3	10–2	
Totals		43–13 (.768)	32–7 (.821)	
Sam Hindsman	1953	2–10	2–8	
Sam Hindsman	1954	7–9	5–7	
Sam Hindsman	1955	10–6	7–5	
Sam Hindsman	1956	5–11	5–7	
Totals		24–36 (.400)	19–27 (.413)	
Raymond Burtner	1957	4–4	0–2	
Raymond Burtner	1958	8–4	8–4	
Totals		12–8 (.600)	8–6 (.571)	
Don Dempsey	1959	3–9	3–9	
Don Dempsey	1960	2–6–1	2–6–1	
Don Dempsey	1961	10–10	5–5	
Don Dempsey	1962	14–6	7–3	
Don Dempsey	1963	10–11	6–6	
Don Dempsey	1964	14–7	8–4 *	
Don Dempsey	1965	12–10	6–6	
Don Dempsey	1966	11–9	7–5	
Don Dempsey	1967	3–15	1–9	
Don Dempsey	1968	7–10–2	5–7	
Don Dempsey	1969	13–8	6–6	
Don Dempsey	1970	8–11	6–4	
Totals		107–112–3 (.489)	62–70–1 (.470)	
Doyle Wallace	1971	16–15	8–8	
Totals		16–15 (.516)	8–8 (.500)	
Ted Lyons	1972	7–14	6–10	
Ted Lyons	1973	11–13–1	5–8–1	
Ted Lyons	1974	12–13	8–8	
Totals		30–40–1 (.430)	19–26–1 (.424)	
Rick Thone	1975	7–13	5–11	
Totals		7–13 (.350)	5–11 (.313)	
Robert Pledger	1976	22–14	11–3 *	Tommy Hester
Robert Pledger	1977	13–12	8–6	
Robert Pledger	1978	10–10	6–8	
Totals		45–36 (.556)	25–17 (.595)	
Robert Campbell	1979	17–17	9–5	
Robert Campbell	1980	16–14	8–6	
Totals		33–31 (.516)	17–11 (.607)	
Jim Franks	1981	21–11	11–3 *	
Jim Franks	1982	25–15	9–5	
Jim Franks	1983	16–12	7–7	
Jim Franks	1984	24–18	9–5	
Jim Franks	1985	26–16	16–4 *	
Jim Franks	1986	19–17	11–9	
Jim Franks	1987	23–13	17–11	
Totals		154–102 (.602)	80–44 (.645)	
Dale Harpenau	1988	29–17	18–6 *	
Dale Harpenau	1989	17–24	8–16	
Dale Harpenau	1990	22–16–1	14–10	
Dale Harpenau	1991	30–17	16–8	
Dale Harpenau	1992	25–16	17–7 *	
Dale Harpenau	1993	26–17	11–11	
Dale Harpenau	1994	34–14–1	20–4	
Dale Harpenau	1995	33–18	20–6	
Dale Harpenau	1996	26–19	7–10	
Dale Harpenau	1997	30–11–1	10–6	
Dale Harpenau	1998	30–16–1	12–5 *	
Totals		302–185–4 (.619)	153–89 (.632)	
Billy Goss	1999	22–21	11–6	
Billy Goss	2000	22–22	7–11	
Billy Goss	2001	32–20	14–9	John Paul Davis
Billy Goss	2002	16–31	7–16	
Billy Goss	2003	29–24	18–14	
Billy Goss	2004	31–23	13–10	
Billy Goss	2005	28–22	17–7	
Billy Goss	2006	19–29	6–17	
Billy Goss	2007	22–32–1	10–10	
Billy Goss	2008	22–23	9–11	
Billy Goss	2009	22–30	9–12	
Totals		265–277–1 (.489)	121–123 (.496)	
Dave Dawson	2010	35–19	14–6	
Dave Dawson	2011	32–19	13–6	Matt Johnson
Dave Dawson	2012	26–27	13–11	Jonathan Finnegan; Landon Sullins
Dave Dawson	2013	32–21	18–12	Cesar Abreu
Dave Dawson	2014	44–12	25–5 *	
Dave Dawson	2015	30–21	16–10	Patrick Castleberry
Dave Dawson	2016	24–31	12–21	
Totals		223–150 (.598)	111–71 (.610)	
All-Time; Records		1287–1048–10 (.551)	660–510–2 (.564)	
* Conference Champion

==== Golf ====
Arkansas Tech's men's golf team was AIC champions in 1966, 1967, 1968, 1969, 1970, 1984, 1992, 1993, 1994 and 1995. Tech became the first school from Arkansas to win the GSC Championship in men's golf in 2004. The 1998 Wonder Boys reached the NCAA Division II National Tournament for men's golf. Tech made its sixth men's golf NCAA Division II Regional Tournament appearance and finished as GSC Tournament runner-up in 2009. Bill Bailey was a four-time All-AIC selectee in golf (1973–76). In 2021, the Wonder Boys won the NCAA Division II men's golf national championship, which was the third national championship won by an Arkansas Tech team, and the first for any Wonder Boys teams.

Golf seasons

Year	Conference	All-American
1964	5th	
1965	7th	
1966	1st	
1967	1st	
1968	1st	
1969	1st	
1970	1st #	
1971	6th	
1972	5th	
1973	3rd	
1974	4th	
1975	8th	
1976	8th	
1977	7th	
1978	6th	
1979	5th	
1980	6th	
1981	9th	

Year	Conference	All-American
1982	6th	
1983	2nd	
1984	1st	
1985	3rd	
1986	3rd	
1987	3rd	
1988	2nd	
1989	2nd	
1990	2nd	
1991	2nd	
1992	1st	
1993	1st #	David Dyer
1994	1st #	
1995	1st #	
1996	T-3rd	
1997	T-5th	
1998	3rd #	
1999	4th	

Year	Conference	All-American
2000	5th	
2001	2nd #	Jeff Jenkins
2002	5th #	
2003	4th #	
2004	1st #	Nick Quast
2005	4th	Nick Quast
2006	6th	
2007	3rd	
2008	5th	
2009	2nd #	
2010	4th	
2011	8th	
2012	2nd	
2013	1st #	
2014	2nd #	
2015	3rd #	
2016	2nd #	

# National Tournament

=== Golden Suns sports ===
==== Cross country ====
Cross country seasons

Year	Conference	Regional	All-American
1995	10th		
1996	6th		
1997	5th		
1998	5th		
1999	5th	14th	
2000	3rd	6th	
2001	3rd	8th	

Year	Conference	Regional	All-American
2002	10th		
2003	3rd	7th	
2004	10th	14th	
2005	11th	16th	Aoife Cooke
2006	11th	19th	
2007	6th	T-7th	
2008	3rd	4th	

Year	Conference	Regional	All-American
2009	3rd	4th	
2010	4th		
2011	3rd		
2012	7th	25th	
2013	5th	27th	
2014	7th	29th	
2015	T-5th	30th	

==== Volleyball ====
The Golden Suns volleyball program won AIC titles in 1983, 1984, 1985 and 1987. The Suns captured GSC West Division volleyball crowns in 1997, 1999, 2000, 2008 and 2010. The 2000 team became the first from Arkansas Tech to qualify for the NCAA Division II Volleyball Tournament.

Volleyball seasons

Coach	Year	Overall	Conference	All-American
Jim Yeager	1977	7–14	0–0	
Jim Yeager	1978	6–9	0–0	
Jim Yeager	1979	4–11	0–0	
Jim Yeager	1980	9–6	0–0	
Jim Yeager	1981	7–8	0–0	
Totals		33–48 (.407)	0–0 (–)	
Jim Dickerson	1982	10–6	0–0	
Jim Dickerson	1983	26–4	12–0 *	
Jim Dickerson	1984	32–5	12–0 *	
Jim Dickerson	1985	34–7	13–1 *	
Totals		102–22 (.823)	37–1 (.974)	
Chris Poole	1986	21–15	11–3	
Totals		21–15 (.583)	11–3 (.786)	
Gaye Griffin	1987	25–8	12–0 *	
Totals		25–8 (.758)	12–0 (1.000)	
Natalie Alred	1988	18–18	7–5	
Natalie Alred	1989	17–17	6–6	
Natalie Alred	1990	17–18	5–7	
Natalie Alred	1991	25–15	7–5	Stacy Burnett–Mallett
Natalie Alred	1992	20–17	3–7	
Natalie Alred	1993	5–21	1–7	
Totals		102–106 (.490)	29–37 (.439)	
Shannon Burks	1994	12–15	4–6	
Shannon Burks	1995	15–15	3–7	
Totals		27–30 (.474)	7–13 (.350)	
Tracy McWilliams	1996	17–18	3–7	
Tracy McWilliams	1997	26–8	10–0 *	Dong Mei Cui
Tracy McWilliams	1998	24–17	7–3	
Tracy McWilliams	1999	34–7	10–0 *	
Tracy McWilliams	2000	36–5 #	12–0 *	
Totals		137–55 (.714)	42–10 (.808)	
Amanda Thiessen	2001	19–12	9–3	
Amanda Thiessen	2002	20–13	8–4	Ningning Liu
Amanda Thiessen	2003	4–25	1–11	
Totals		43–50 (.462)	18–18 (.500)	
Kristy Bayer	2004	13–17	5–7	
Kristy Bayer	2005	25–12	9–5	
Kristy Bayer	2006	20–16	5–7	
Kristy Bayer	2007	22–13	8–4	
Kristy Bayer	2008	31–5	11–1	
Kristy Bayer	2009	24–13	8–4	
Kristy Bayer	2010	31–5	11–1	Sarah Von Lienen
Kristy Bayer	2011	35–4 #	16–0 *	Laura Farney
Kristy Bayer	2012	27–10	11–3	
Kristy Bayer	2013	25–12 #	9–5	
Kristy Bayer	2014	29–6 #	13–1 *	
Kristy Bayer	2015	26–7	15–1 *	
Totals		308–120 (.720)	121–39 (.756)	
All-Time; Records		798–454 (.637)	277–121 (.696)	
# National Tournament * Conference Champion

==== Basketball ====
Arkansas Tech's two greatest moments of athletic glory were provided by the back-to-back NAIA Division I national championships captured by the Golden Suns basketball program in 1992 and 1993. The 1991–92 team finished with an overall record of 35–1. The 1991–92 Golden Suns won each of their final 28 games by 12 points or more, including an 84–68 win over Wayland Baptist University (Texas) in the national championship game. The Suns won their second consecutive national crown in 1993 by defeating Union University (Tenn.) 76–75. Joe Foley, Tech head women's basketball coach from 1987–2003, was the architect of both national championship teams.

Today, the Golden Suns basketball program ranks among the top five in NCAA Division II history in winning percentage and all-time wins. The Suns finished as NCAA Division II national runners-up in 1999, and they made it back to the NCAA Division II Tournament for the first time in three years during the 2006–07 season. Tech made it back-to-back trips to the NCAA tournament when the Suns qualified for the event again in 2008. Arkansas Tech captured consecutive NCAA Division II South Region titles and back-to-back GSC Tournament championships in women's basketball in 2010 and 2011.

Basketball seasons

Coach	Year	Overall	Conference	All-American
Jim Yeager	1977–78	5–18	3–15	
Jim Yeager	1978–79	24–4	16–2 *	
Jim Yeager	1979–80	29–2 #	17–1 *	Sherry Raney
Jim Yeager	1980–81	29–3	16–2 *	Sherry Raney
Jim Yeager	1981–82	20–6	13–5 *	Sherry Raney
Totals		107–33 (.764)	65–25 (.722)	
Jim Dickerson	1982–83	22–7	10–2	
Jim Dickerson	1983–84	23–9	10–4	
Jim Dickerson	1984–85	23–8	11–5	
Jim Dickerson	1985–86	23–3	17–1 *	
Jim Dickerson	1986–87	29–6 %	16–2 *	Donna Brunson
Totals		120–33 (.784)	64–14 (.821)	
Joe Foley	1987–88	29–5 %	14–2 *	Donna Brunson
Joe Foley	1988–89	35–2 %	16–0 *	Lanell Dawson; Cindi Patton; Kala Cooley
Joe Foley	1989–90	30–3	15–1 *	Lanell Dawson
Joe Foley	1990–91	28–6	14–2 *	Amanda Hill
Joe Foley	1991–92	35–1 !	16–0 *	Stephanie Strack; Alison Setliff
Joe Foley	1992–93	31–5 !	12–4	Stephanie Strack; Alison Setliff; Dawn Grell
Joe Foley	1993–94	30–3 #	14–0 *	Stephanie Strack; Alison Setliff; Dawn Grell; Carin Pinion
Joe Foley	1994–95	28–6 #	15–1 *	
Joe Foley	1995–96	23–9 #	11–3	Kim Stephens
Joe Foley	1996–97	29–4 %	13–1	Heather Campbell; Jennifer Richardson
Joe Foley	1997–98	26–5 #	12–2 *	Jennifer Richardson
Joe Foley	1998–99	31–7 %	11–3	
Joe Foley	1999–00	24–7 #	13–1 *	
Joe Foley	2000–01	23–8 #	13–3	
Joe Foley	2001–02	25–6 #	13–3 *	
Joe Foley	2002–03	29–4 #	14–2 *	
Totals		456–81 (.849)	216–28 (.885)	
Carin Pinion–McNabb	2003–04	13–14	6–10	
Carin Pinion–McNabb	2004–05	10–19	5–11	
Totals		23–33 (.411)	11–21 (.344)	
Todd Schaefer	2005–06	15–12	7–9	
Todd Schaefer	2006–07	22–10 #	11–3	
Totals		37–22 (.627)	18–12 (.600)	
Dave Wilbers	2007–08	26–6 #	12–2	Amanda Grappe
Dave Wilbers	2008–09	19–9	9–5	Amanda Grappe
Dave Wilbers	2009–10	31–3 #	12–2 *	Jenny Vining
Dave Wilbers	2010–11	30–3 #	13–1 *	Natalia Santos
Dave Wilbers	2011–12	22–4	13–3	
Dave Wilbers	2012–13	23–7 #	17–3 *	Roselis Silva
Dave Wilbers	2013–14	17–11	12–8	
Dave Wilbers	2014–15	23–7 #	16–4	Fatima Adams
Dave Wilbers	2015–16	27–4 #	21–1 *	Fatima Adams
Totals		218–54 (.801)	125–29 (.812)	
All-Time; Records		961–256 (.790)	499–129 (.795)	
! NAIA National Champion % National Tournament Final Four # National Tournament * Conference Champion

==== Golf ====
Arkansas Tech won its first GSC championship in women's golf during the 2010–11 season.

Golf seasons

Year	Conference	All-American
2002	No Tournament	
2003	3rd	
2004	3rd	
2005	3rd	
2006	4th	

Year	Conference	All-American
2007	2nd	
2008	5th	
2009	5th	
2010	4th	
2011	1st	

Year	Conference	All-American
2012	2nd #	
2013	3rd #	Rebecka Surtevall
2014	2nd #	
2015	1st #	Rebecka Surtevall
2016	1st #	

# National Tournament

==== Softball ====
Arkansas Tech won GSC West Division softball championships in 2008 and 2009 and finished as GSC softball tournament runner-up in both 2008 and 2009.

Softball seasons

Coach	Year	Overall	Conference	All-American
Kristie Betancur	2003	21–9	0–0	
Kristie Betancur	2004	15–26	6–16	
Kristie Betancur	2005	27–21	10–18	
Totals		63–56 (.529)	16–34 (.320)	
Gidget Pambianchi	2006	22–25	13–20	
Gidget Pambianchi	2007	12–35	5–22	
Gidget Pambianchi	2008	41–17	20–9	
Gidget Pambianchi	2009	42–21	19–9	
Gidget Pambianchi	2010	22–26	12–18	
Gidget Pambianchi	2011	34–19	23–7	
Gidget Pambianchi	2012	11–17	5–9	
Totals		184–160 (.535)	97–94 (.508)	
Kristy Bayer (interim)	2012	5–14 (16–31 α)	3–9 (8–18 α)	
Totals		5–14 (.263)	3–9 (.250)	
Kristina McSweeney	2013	26–23	19–15	Siarra Gomez
Kristina McSweeney	2014	31–27	19–21	
Kristina McSweeney	2015	41–22 #	22–14	
Kristina McSweeney	2016	49–11 #	34–6	Jalissa Gum
Totals		147–83 (.639)	94–56 (.627)	
All-Time; Records		399–313 (.560)	210–193 (.521)	
# National Tournament α Full Season Record

==== Tennis ====
The Golden Suns tennis program made four consecutive GSC Tournament appearances in from 2008–11 and established a new school record for tennis victories in a season (17) during the 2009 campaign.

Tennis seasons

Coach	Year	Overall	Conference	All-American
Natalie Alred	1993	3–10	3–9	
Natalie Alred	1994	4–8	4–6	
Totals		7–18 (.280)	7–15 (.318)	
Clarence Holley	1995	14–1	11–1 *	
Totals		14–1 (.933)	11–1 (.917)	
Tom Olsen	1996	4–13	1–8	
Tom Olsen	1997	3–10	1–5	
Totals		7–23 (.233)	2–13 (.133)	
Mark Dannhoff	1998	5–9	3–4	
Totals		5–9 (.357)	3–4 (.429)	
John Bateman	1999	6–12	2–4	
Totals		6–12 (.333)	2–4 (.333)	
Brent Good	2000	7–16	2–4	
Totals		7–16 (.304)	2–4 (.333)	
Shery Forrest	2001	9–17	3–5	
Shery Forrest	2002	14–11 #	4–4	
Shery Forrest	2003	12–11	4–4	
Shery Forrest	2004	5–16	3–5	
Totals		40–55 (.421)	14–18 (.438)	
Abby Davis	2005	7–16	3–5	
Abby Davis	2006	6–19	2–5	
Abby Davis	2007	6–16	1–5	
Abby Davis	2008	11–10	3–3	
Abby Davis	2009	17–5	4–2	
Abby Davis	2010	10–6	4–2	
Abby Davis	2011	10–7	3–2	
Abby Davis	2012	17–5	6–0 *	
Abby Davis	2013	12–6	5–1 *	
Abby Davis	2014	16–6 #	5–1	
Abby Davis	2015	18–5 #	5–1	
Abby Davis	2016	11–13	4–3	
Totals		141–114 (.553)	45–30 (.600)	
All-Time; Records		227–248 (.478)	86–89 (.491)	
# National Tournament * Conference Champion

== Notable athletes ==
- Tanner Marsh, Former Canadian Football League quarterback for the Montreal Alouettes.
- David Bevis, former professional basketball player.
- Ed Meador, former NFL defensive back for the Los Angeles Rams
- Taelon Peter, professional basketball player for the Indiana Pacers
