= Hirst-Mathew Hall =

- U.S. National Register of Historic Places
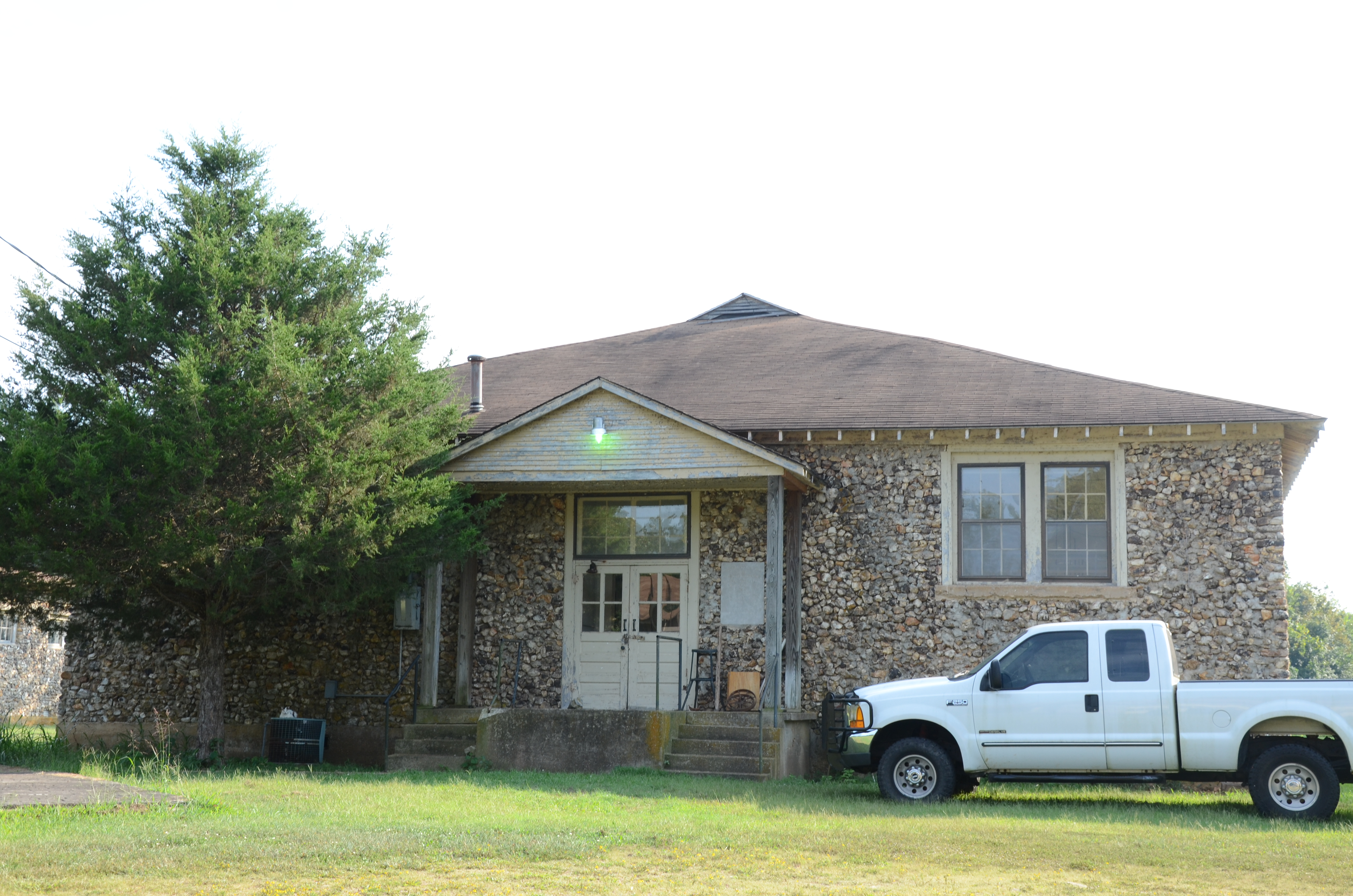

- Location within Arkansas Location within the United States
- Location: AR 235 Spur, Bruno, Arkansas
- Coordinates: 36°8′31″N 92°46′53″W
- Area: 1 acre (0.40 ha)
- Built by: J.G. Robinson
- Architectural style: Bungalow/craftsman, Plain Traditional
- MPS: Public Schools in the Ozarks MPS
- NRHP reference No.: 92001114
- Added to NRHP: September 4, 1992

Hirst-Mathew Hall is a historic school building in Bruno, Arkansas. It is located in a complex included several other school buildings south of Arkansas Highway 235, between County Roads 5008 and 5010. It is a single-story stone structure, with a gable-on-hip roof that has exposed rafter ends in the Craftsman style. The main (north-facing) facade has a centered gable-roof porch supported by four columns set on a raised concrete base. The east facade has 14 windows, placed asymmetrically in groups of six, three and five. The west facade has 12 windows in two groups of six. It was built in 1929 as part of the Bruno Agricultural School, and originally housed classrooms. The schools had been founded in 1921 under the Smith–Hughes Act. When it was listed on the National Register of Historic Places in 1992, it was in use as a textile factory.

The building was listed on the National Register of Historic Places in 1992.

== See also ==
- Aggie Hall – 1926 Bruno Agricultural School gymnasium
- Aggie Workshop – 1935 Bruno Agricultural School workshop
- Bruno School Building – 1920 Bruno Agricultural School main building
- National Register of Historic Places listings in Marion County, Arkansas
