= Flippin High School =

Location
- 103 Alford Street; Flippin, Arkansas 72634; United States; 36°16′48″N 92°36′0″W

Information
- School type: Public (government funded)
- Established: 1927 (99 years ago)
- Status: Open
- School district: Flippin School District
- NCES District ID: 0506150
- Authority: Arkansas Department of Education (ADE)
- CEEB code: 040775
- NCES School ID: 050615000331
- Teaching staff: 60.02 (on FTE basis)
- Grades: 9–12
- Enrollment: 242 (2023–2024)
  - Grade 9: 57
  - Grade 10: 57
  - Grade 11: 74
  - Grade 12: 53
- Student to teacher ratio: 4.03
- Education system: ADE Smart Core curriculum
- Colors: Red and white
- Athletics conference: 3A Region 1 (2022-2024)
- Mascot: Bobcats
- Team name: Flippin Bobcats
- Feeder schools: Flippin Middle School
- Affiliation: Arkansas Activities Association
- Website: flippinschools.com/high-school/home/

Flippin High School is a comprehensive public high school serving students in grades nine through twelve in the remote, rural community of Flippin, Arkansas, United States. It is the one of three high schools in Marion County and the sole high school administered by the Flippin School District.

== History ==
According to records found in the Marion County Courthouse indicate that Flippin's school began in 1895 in a one-room building. The school followed the town's movement closer to the railroad track, originally occupying a two-story, two-room frame building alongside Crane Creek. In 1917, two more rooms—one upstairs and one downstairs—were added to accommodate growth.

G. B. Keeter became superintendent of Flippin's school in 1926 and is credited with many improvements to it and the community. The school became accredited in 1926, began offering three years of high school in 1927, and graduated its first class of six seniors in 1929. Consolidation of many outlying schools necessitated growth, and, in the late 1920s, the school moved to where it stands as of 2010.

== Academics ==
This Title I school is accredited by the Arkansas Department of Education (ADE). The assumed course of study follows the Smart Core curriculum developed the Arkansas Department of Education (ADE). Students engage in regular (core and career focus) courses and exams and may select Advanced Placement (AP) coursework and exams that provide an opportunity for college credit.

== Athletics ==
The Flippin High School mascot and athletic emblem is the Bobcat with the school colors of red and white.

The Flippin Bobcats participate in various interscholastic activities within the 3A Classification from the 3A-1 Conference administered by the Arkansas Activities Association. The school athletic activities include volleyball, golf (boys/girls), cross country (boys/girls), bowling (boys/girls), basketball (boys/girls), cheer, baseball, softball, fishing, and track and field (boys/girls). The girls basketball team won the state championship three times in 1984, 1985, and 1988.
