= Loren P. Thompson =

American politician (1927–2015)

Loren Percy Thompson
- Born: February 28, 1927; Chicago, Illinois, U.S.
- Died: October 18, 2015 (aged 88); Detroit Lakes, Minnesota, U.S.
- Education: St. Ambrose University, Boston University
- Known for: Member of the Minnesota House of Representatives, Mayor of Bull Shoals, Arkansas
- Office: Member of the Minnesota House of Representatives
- Political party: Democratic
- Spouse: Janie Thompson

Loren Percy Thompson (February 28, 1927 – October 18, 2015) was an American politician and resort owner.

Born in Chicago, Illinois, Thompson served in the United States Navy. He received his bachelor's degree in physics from St. Ambrose University in Davenport, Iowa. He also went to graduate school at Boston University. In 1976, Thompson bought Cedar Crest Resort on White Earth Lake in Maple Grove Township, Becker County, Minnesota. In 1991 and 1992, Thompson served in the Minnesota House of Representatives and was a Democrat. He was elected from Waubun, Minnesota. In 1996, Thompson and his wife Janie moved to Bull Shoals, Arkansas and he served as the mayor of Bull Shoals. In 2009, he moved to Detroit Lakes, Minnesota. Thompson died in Detroit Lakes, Minnesota.
