= Western Grove, Arkansas =

- Town
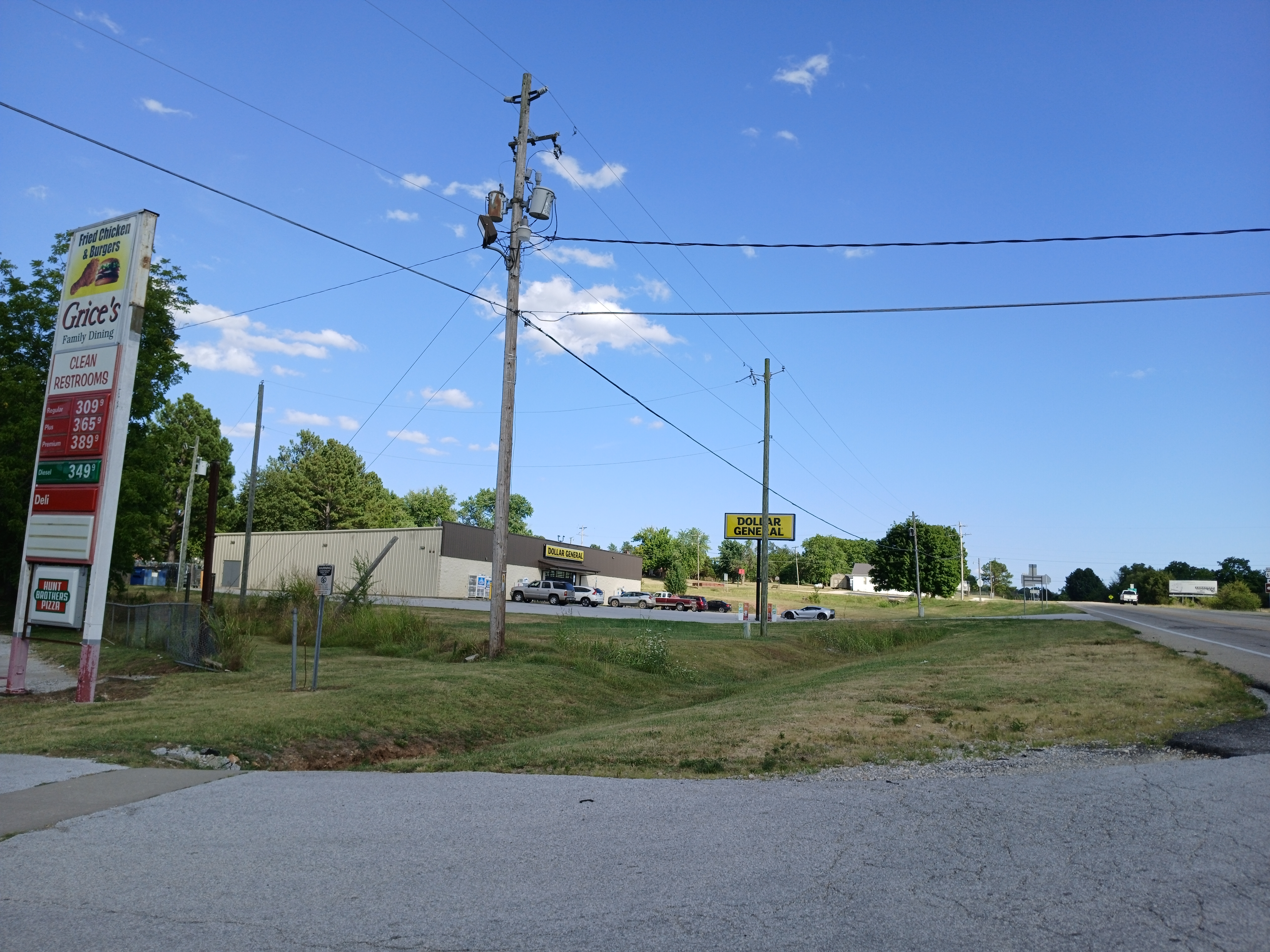
- Buildings along U.S. Route 65, July 2024

- Location of Western Grove in Newton County, Arkansas.
- Coordinates: 36°06′04″N 92°57′16″W
- Country: United States
- State: Arkansas
- County: Newton

Area
  - Total: 1.08 sq mi (2.79 km^{2})
  - Land: 1.08 sq mi (2.79 km^{2})
  - Water: 0 sq mi (0.00 km^{2})
- Elevation: 1,050 ft (320 m)

Population (2020)
  - Total: 354
  - Estimate (2025): 346 ▼
  - Density: 328.6/sq mi (126.87/km^{2})
- Time zone: UTC-6 (Central (CST))
  - Summer (DST): UTC-5 (CDT)
- ZIP code: 72685
- Area code: 870
- FIPS code: 05-74330
- GNIS feature ID: 2406868

Western Grove is a town in northeastern Newton County, Arkansas, United States. As of the 2020 census, Western Grove had a population of 354. It is part of the Harrison Micropolitan Statistical Area.

== Geography ==
According to the United States Census Bureau, the town has a total area of 2.8 km^{2} (1.1 mi^{2}), all land.

=== Major highway ===
- U.S. Highway 65

== Demographics ==
Historical population
Census	Pop.	Note	%±
1950	184		—
1960	148		−19.6%
1970	179		20.9%
1980	378		111.2%
1990	415		9.8%
2000	407		−1.9%
2010	384		−5.7%
2020	354		−7.8%
2025 (est.)	346	▼	−2.3%
U.S. Decennial Census

=== 2020 census ===
Western Grove racial composition
Race	Number	Percentage
White (non-Hispanic)	322	90.96%
Other/Mixed	28	7.91%
Hispanic or Latino	4	1.13%

As of the 2020 United States census, there were 354 people, 186 households, and 136 families residing in the town.

=== 2000 census ===
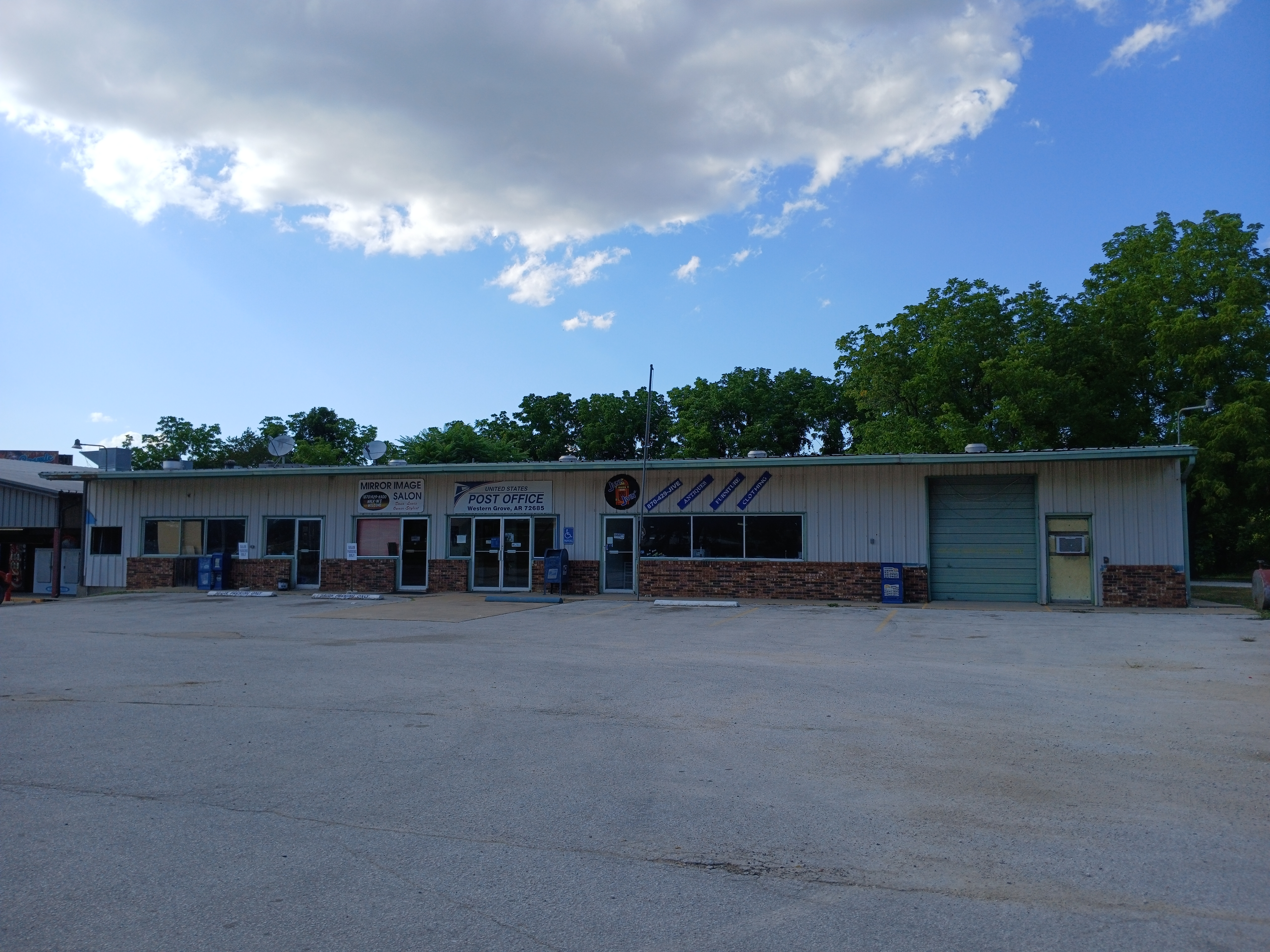
Commercial strip containing the Western Grove post office

As of the census of 2000, there were 407 people, 169 households, and 126 families residing in the town. The population density was 145.5/km^{2} (375.1/mi^{2}). There were 193 housing units at an average density of 69.0/km^{2} (177.9/mi^{2}). The racial makeup of the town was 99.51% White, and 0.49% from two or more races. There were 169 households, out of which 37.9% had children under the age of 18 living with them, 55.0% were married couples living together, 17.8% had a female householder with no husband present, and 25.4% were non-families. 24.3% of all households were made up of individuals, and 11.8% had someone living alone who was 65 years of age or older. The average household size was 2.41 and the average family size was 2.84.

In the town, the population was spread out, with 27.0% under the age of 18, 9.3% from 18 to 24, 29.7% from 25 to 44, 23.3% from 45 to 64, and 10.6% who were 65 years of age or older. The median age was 34 years. For every 100 females, there were 80.1 males. For every 100 females age 18 and over, there were 74.7 males.

The median income for a household in the town was $24,722, and the median income for a family was $30,694. Males had a median income of $25,000 versus $16,375 for females. The per capita income for the town was $12,731. About 11.2% of families and 14.6% of the population were below the poverty line, including 27.7% of those under age 18 and 4.2% of those age 65 or over.

== Education ==
Western Grove is within the Ozark Mountain School District, which operates Western Grove Elementary School and Ozark Mountain High School. The latter is located in the former Western Grove High School, which consolidated into Ozark Mountain High in 2023.

On July 1, 2004, the former Western Grove School District consolidated into the Ozark Mountain School District.
