= Aggie Hall =

- U.S. National Register of Historic Places
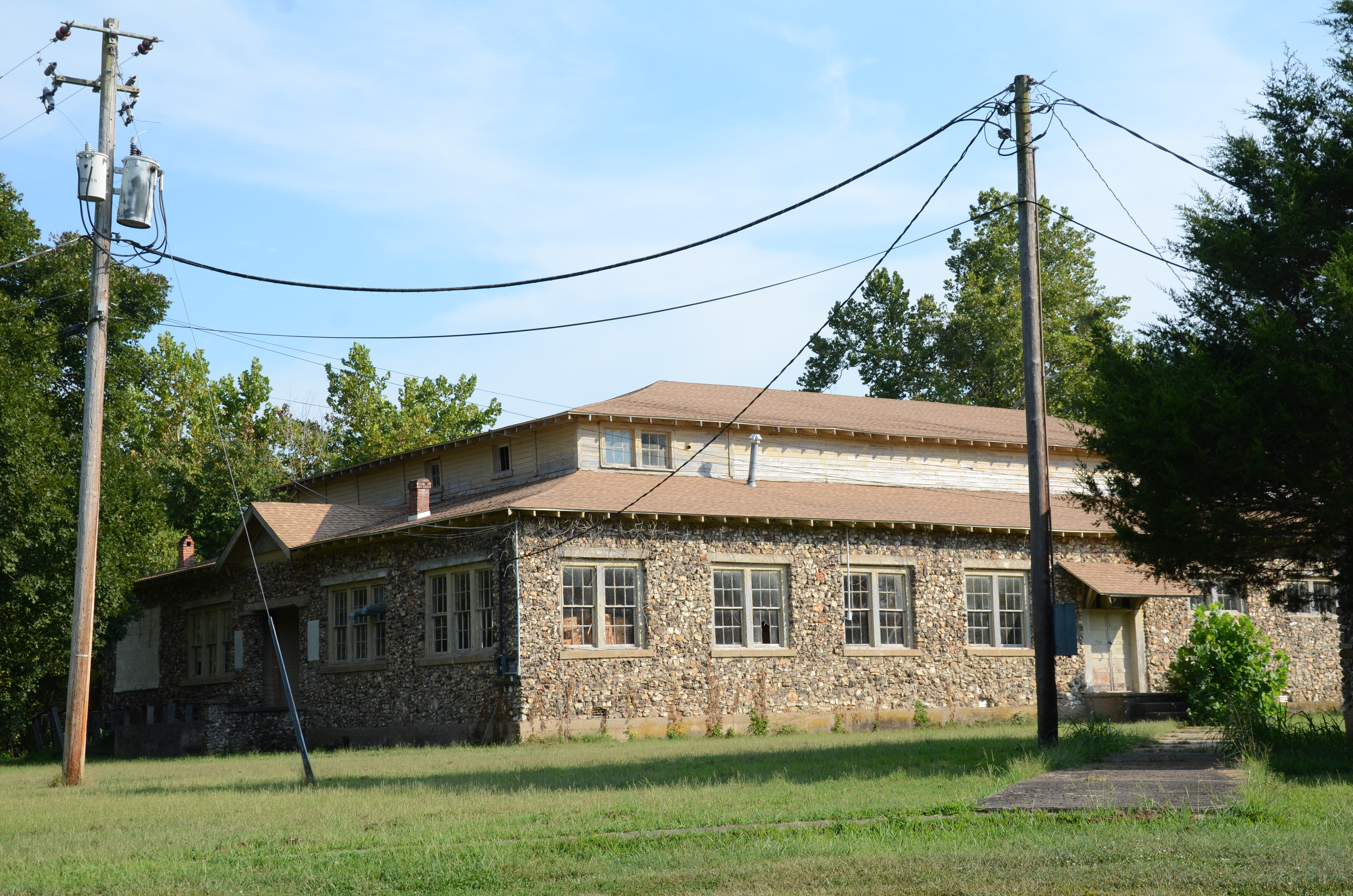

- Location within Arkansas Location within the United States
- Location: Co. Rd. 5008, Bruno, Arkansas
- Coordinates: 36°8′30″N 92°46′51″W
- Area: less than one acre
- Architect: Smith-Hughes Aggie Boys
- Architectural style: Bungalow/craftsman, Plain Traditional
- MPS: Public Schools in the Ozarks MPS
- NRHP reference No.: 92001115
- Added to NRHP: September 4, 1992

Aggie Hall is a historic former gymnasium in Bruno, Arkansas, a short way south of Arkansas Highway 235. It is a single-story stone structure, topped by a hip roof which has a clerestory section (also hip-roofed) at its center. The clerestory is finished in weatherboard; both roof lines have Craftsman-style exposed rafter ends. The building was erected in 1926 by the student members of the Lincoln Aggie Club, believed to be the first chapter established (in 1921) of the Future Farmers of America, and was originally intended as a gymnasium for the adjacent Bruno Agricultural School and as a location for the club's activities.

The building was listed on the National Register of Historic Places in 1992, at which time it was being used as a warehouse.

== See also ==
- Aggie Workshop: 1935 Bruno Agricultural School workshop
- Bruno School Building: 1920 Bruno Agricultura School main building
- Hirst-Mathew Hall: 1929 Bruno Agricultural School classrooms
- National Register of Historic Places listings in Marion County, Arkansas
