= Arkansas Highway 125 =

State highway in Arkansas, United States

Highway 125

Route information
- Maintained by AHTD
- Length: 30.14 mi (48.51 km) Length includes the ferry connection

Major junctions
- South end: AR 235 near Bruno
- US 62 / US 412 in Pyatt; AR 14 near Dodd City
- North end: Route 125 at the Missouri state line near Peel

Location
- Country: United States
- State: Arkansas
- Counties: Marion

Highway system
- Arkansas Highway System; Interstate; US; State; Business; Spurs; Suffixed; Scenic; Heritage
← AR 124	→ AR 126

Highway 125 (AR 125, Ark. 125, and Hwy. 125) is a north–south state highway in Marion County, Arkansas, United States. The route runs 30.14 miles (48.51 km) from Arkansas Highway 235 near Bruno north to the Missouri state line across Bull Shoals Lake on Arkansas' only ferry within the state highway system.

== Route description ==
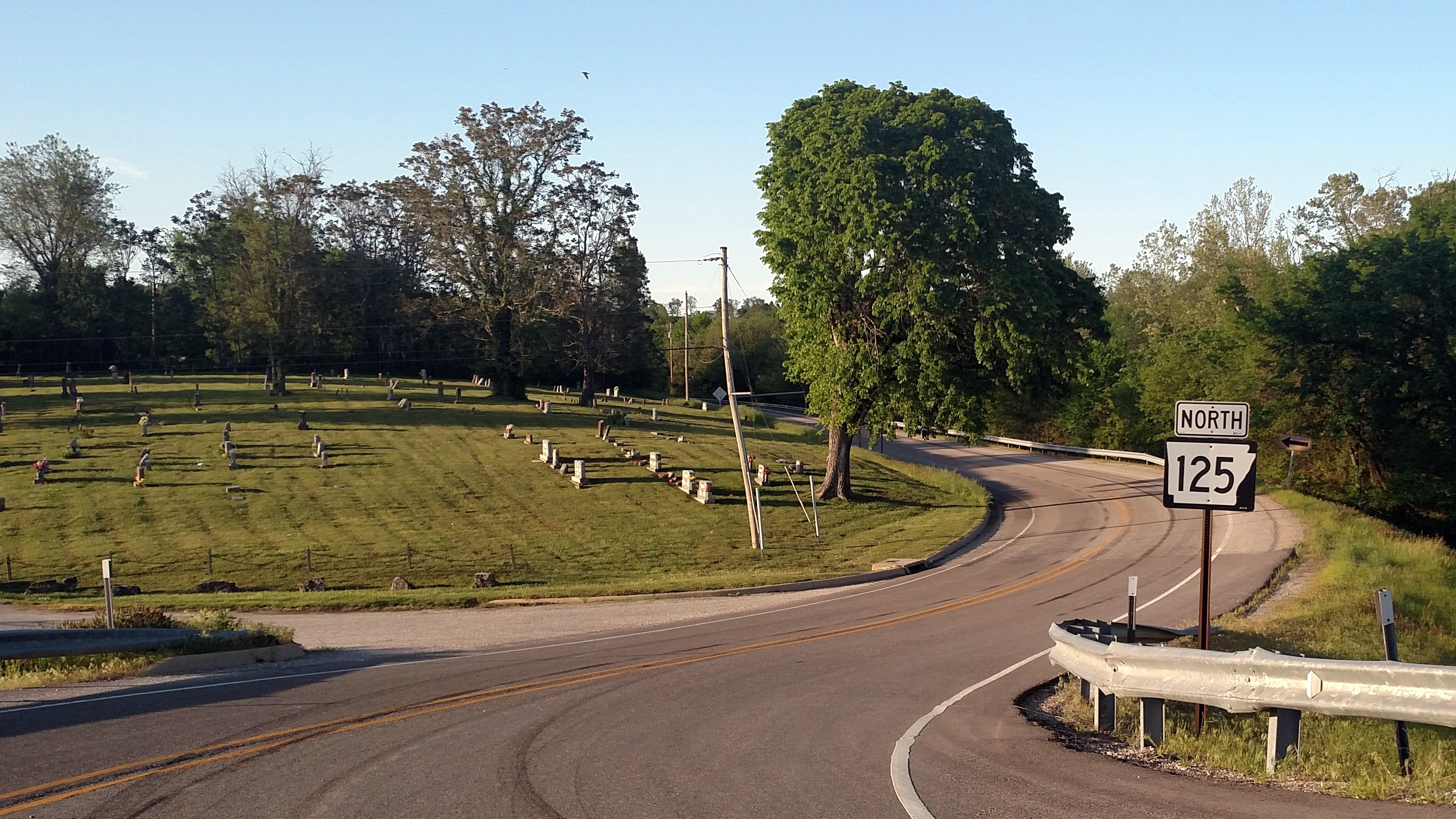
Highway 125 at George's Creek just north of the US 62/US 412 concurrency

The route begins at Arkansas Highway 235 near Bruno and runs north past the historic Eros School Building to intersect US 62/US 412 in Pyatt. The routes become concurrent until George's Creek, near the George's Creek Cemetery.

Highway 125 winds north through farms and trees until forming a concurrency with Highway 14 near Lakeway. Highway 14 turns west north of Lakeway, with Highway 125 continuing north through Peel. North of Peel, Highway 125 passes the Highway 125 Use Area on Bull Shoals Lake, which features a boat ramp, public marina, playground, and campground. Highway 125 crosses the Lake on the Peel Ferry, a free ferry and the only ferry in the Arkansas state highway system. Now on the west side of the Lake, Highway 125 runs north to the Missouri state line, where it continues as Missouri Route 125.

== Peel Ferry ==
The Peel Ferry (or Peel's Ferry) is free across Bull Shoals Lake, operating during daylight hours. A ferry has always crossed the water here, prior to the building of Bull Shoals Lake, a wooden craft crossed the White River, giving access to the Missouri side of the water. The boat runs year-round, only halted by dense fog or high wind. Without the ferry, travelers and locals would otherwise need to drive 50 miles (80 km) around the lake to gain access to Missouri.

Two new boats were purchased and dedicated in June 2011.

== Major intersections ==
Mile markers reset at concurrencies. The entire route is in Marion County.

Location	mi	km	Destinations	Notes
	0.00	0.00	AR 235	Southern terminus; road continues as AR 235 north
	8.02	12.91	US 62 / US 412 west – Harrison	South end of US 62/US 412 concurrency, 6.2 miles (10.0 km) in length
Pyatt			US 62S north	
George's Creek	0.00	0.00	US 62 / US 412 east – Mountain Home	North end of US 62/US 412 concurrency
	7.36	11.84	AR 14 east – Yellville	South end of AR 14 concurrency, 3.26 miles (5.25 km) in length
	0.00	0.00	AR 14 west – Lead Hill, Diamond City	North end of AR 14 concurrency
	12.36– 13.18	19.89– 21.21	Peel Ferry across Bull Shoals Lake	
	14.01	22.55	Route 125 north	Continuation into Missouri
1.000 mi = 1.609 km; 1.000 km = 0.621 mi: Concurrency terminus

== See also ==
- List of state highways in Arkansas
