= Flippin School District =

School district in Arkansas, United States

Address
- 210 Alford Street Flippin, Arkansas, 72634; United States

District information
- Type: Public
- Grades: PreK–12
- NCES District ID: 0506150

Students and staff
- Students: 910
- Teachers: 87.79
- Staff: 72.25
- Student–teacher ratio: 10.37

Other information
- Website: flippinschools.com

Flippin School District is a school district in Marion County, Arkansas, United States.

== Schools ==
The District includes:

- Flippin Elementary School
- Flippin Middle School
- Flippin High School
