= Bruno-Pyatt School District =

Defunct school district in Arkansas, United States

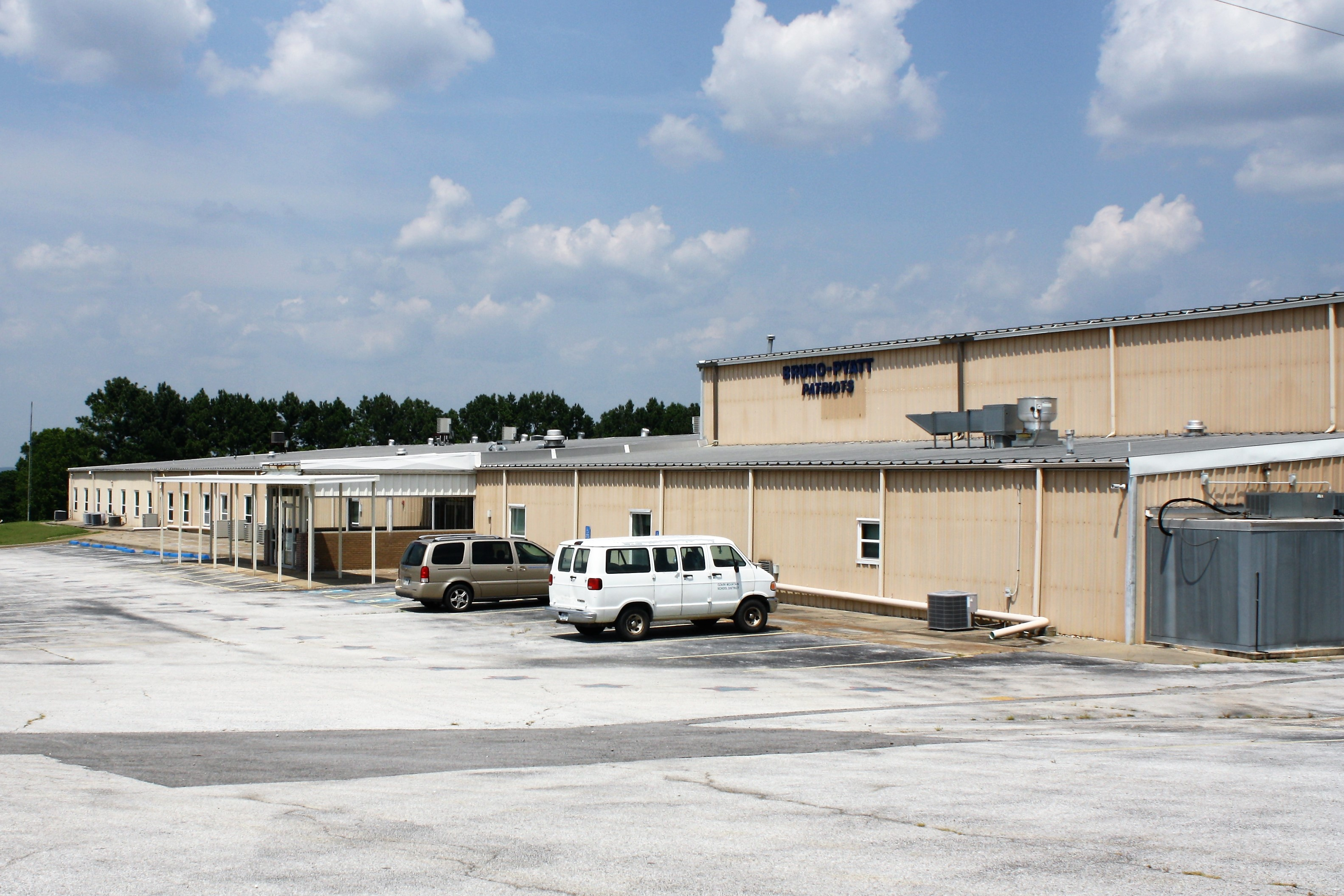
- Bruno-Pyatt School, including Bruno-Pyatt High School

Location
- Eros, in unincorporated Marion County, Arkansas United States

District information
- Closed: July 1, 2004

Bruno-Pyatt School District No. 1 was a school district headquartered in Eros, in unincorporated Marion County, Arkansas; the campus had an Everton postal address. In addition to Eros it served Bruno and Pyatt.

It operated Bruno-Pyatt Elementary School and Bruno–Pyatt High School.

== History ==
In 1969 the State of Arkansas enacted the Quality Education Act, which was to require schools to merge into others that attained a classification of "A" by 1979. This and other factors resulted in the Bruno and Pyatt schools consolidating. Groundbreaking for the consolidated school occurred in 1973. The Bruno-Pyatt School was created in 1974 as a consolidation of schools in Bruno and Pyatt. The school opened in September that year.

On July 1, 2004, the school district consolidated with the St. Joe School District and the Western Grove School District into the Ozark Mountain School District.

== See also ==
- Bruno School Building
