= Ozark Mountain School District =

School district in Arkansas

Location
- 250 South Highway 65; St. Joe, Arkansas 72675 The Ozarks United States

District information
- Type: Comprehensive public
- Grades: K-12
- Established: 2004
- Superintendent: Jeff Lewis
- Schools: 3 (K-12)
- NCES District ID: 0500076

Students and staff
- Students: 653
- Teachers: 69.11 (on FTE basis)
- Student–teacher ratio: 9.45
- Athletic conference: 2A East (2012–14)
- District mascot: Bears
- Colors

Other information
- Website: ozarkmountainschooldistrict.com

Ozark Mountain School District (OMSD) is a public school district that provides comprehensive education to its students from prekindergarten to grade 12 and is situated in the Ozark Mountains (hence the name of the district) and covers 368 square miles (950 km^{2}) in northern Arkansas, United States.

Within Searcy County the district includes St. Joe, Gilbert, and Pindall. Within Newton County the district includes Western Grove. The district also includes a section of Marion County, including Pyatt, Bruno, and Eros.

Due to the nature of the district's formation from consolidation of three smaller school districts, June Turney Young of The Mountaineer Echo described it as an "umbrella district".

== History ==
OMSD formed in 2004 as a result of an Arkansas law stating that school districts must have a minimum of 350 students. This requirement led to the July 1, 2004 consolidation of three separate school districts, Bruno–Pyatt, St. Joe and Western Grove, into the Ozark Mountain School District. In 2012, the nearby Lead Hill School District failed in an attempt to consolidate with OMSD.

James Trammell was superintendent until 2006. The board of trustees selected Delana Gammill as the new superintendent that year.

In 2022 the district administration announced that it hoped to have a consolidated K-12 campus in the future.

== Schools ==
The Ozark Mountain School District currently consists of one high school for the upper grade levels and two elementary school campuses for the lower ones.

High School (Grades 7 and above)

- Ozark Mountain High School

Elementary Schools (Grades 6 and under)

- St. Joe Elementary School
- Western Grove Elementary School

Former high schools and middle schools

The three secondary education facilities that the formerly district maintained were as follows:

- Bruno–Pyatt High School – Located in Eros, this Marion County-based school had the mascot of the Patriots with Red, White, and Blue as its school colors.
- St. Joe High School – Located in St. Joe, this Searcy County-based school had the mascot of the Wildcats with blue and gold as its school colors.
- Western Grove High School – Located in Western Grove, this Newton County-based school had the mascot of the Warriors with blue and gold as its school colors.

Each school was listed and unranked in the Best High Schools 2012 report developed by U.S. News & World Report.

== See also ==
- List of school districts in Arkansas
