= Western Grove High School =

Ozark Mountain High School

Location
- 300 School Street; Western Grove, Arkansas 72685; United States; 36°5′56″N 92°57′19″W

Information
- School type: Public (government funded)
- Status: Open
- School district: Ozark Mountain School District (2004-2023)
- NCES District ID: 0500076
- Authority: Arkansas Department of Education (ADE)
- CEEB code: 042605
- NCES School ID: 050007601149
- Grades: 7–12
- Enrollment: 105 (2010–11)
- Student to teacher ratio: 11.08
- Education system: ADE Smart Core curriculum
- Classes offered: Regular, Career Focus, Advanced Placement
- Colors: Gray and blue
- Athletics conference: 1A East (2012–14)
- Mascot: Bear
- Team name: Ozark Mountain Bears
- USNWR ranking: Unranked
- Feeder schools: Western Grove Elementary School
- Affiliation: Arkansas Activities Association
- Website: westerngrovepublicschool.com

Ozark Mountain High School is a comprehensive public high school serving students in grades seven through twelve in the remote, rural community of Western Grove, Arkansas, United States. It is the only high school administered by the Ozark Mountain School District and the district's only high school in Newton County, Arkansas.

It replaced Western Grove High School in 2023.

== History ==
On July 1, 2004, the former Western Grove School District, which operated the school, consolidated into the Ozark Mountain School District.

In February 2023, Western Grove High School had 100 students for both middle and high school levels. That year, it consolidated into Ozark Mountain High School. The school district's board and the Arkansas Board of Education approved the consolidation. According to Jeff Lewis, the superintendent, the Western Grove campus had enough capacity to house all of the middle and high school students in the district.

== Academics ==
This Title I school is accredited by the Arkansas Department of Education (ADE). The assumed course of study follows the Smart Core curriculum developed the Arkansas Department of Education (ADE), which requires students to complete at least 22 credit units before graduation. Students engage in regular (core) and career focus courses and exams and may select Advanced Placement (AP) coursework and exams that may lead to college credit.

== Extracurricular activities ==
The Ozark Mountain High School mascot and athletic emblem is the Bears with school colors of gray and blue.

=== Athletics ===
The Ozark Mountain High School participates in various interscholastic activities in the 1A Classification—the state's smallest classification—within the 1A East Conference administered by the Arkansas Activities Association. As one of the smallest schools in the state, the school athletic activities are limited to basketball (boys/girls), tennis (boys/girls), and track and field (boys/girls).
