= Marion County, Arkansas =

County in Arkansas, United States

- County
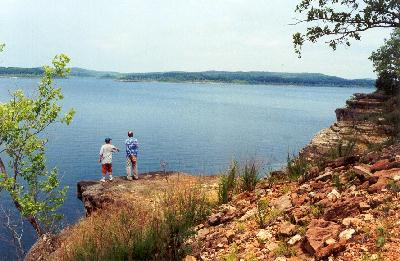
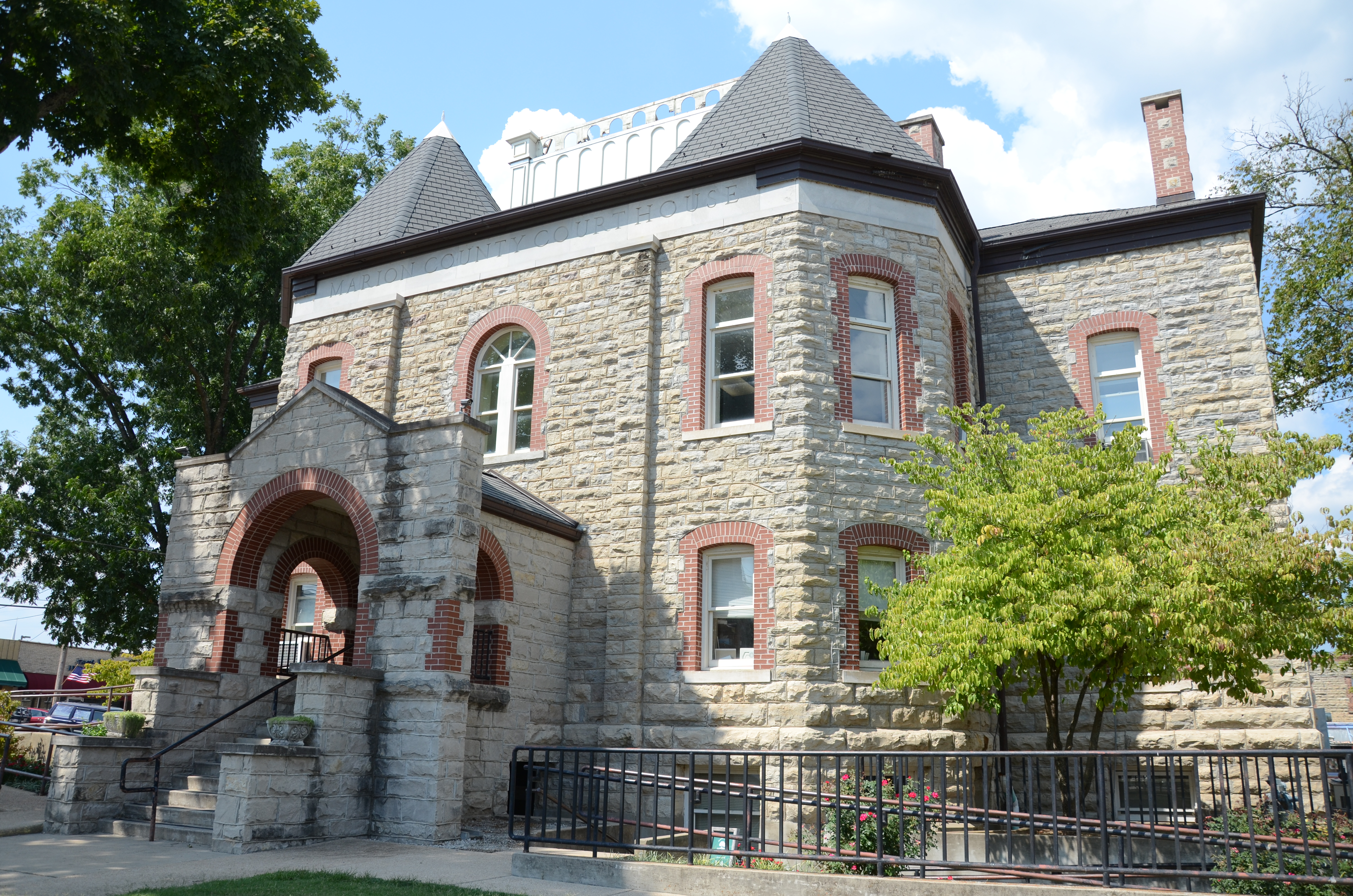
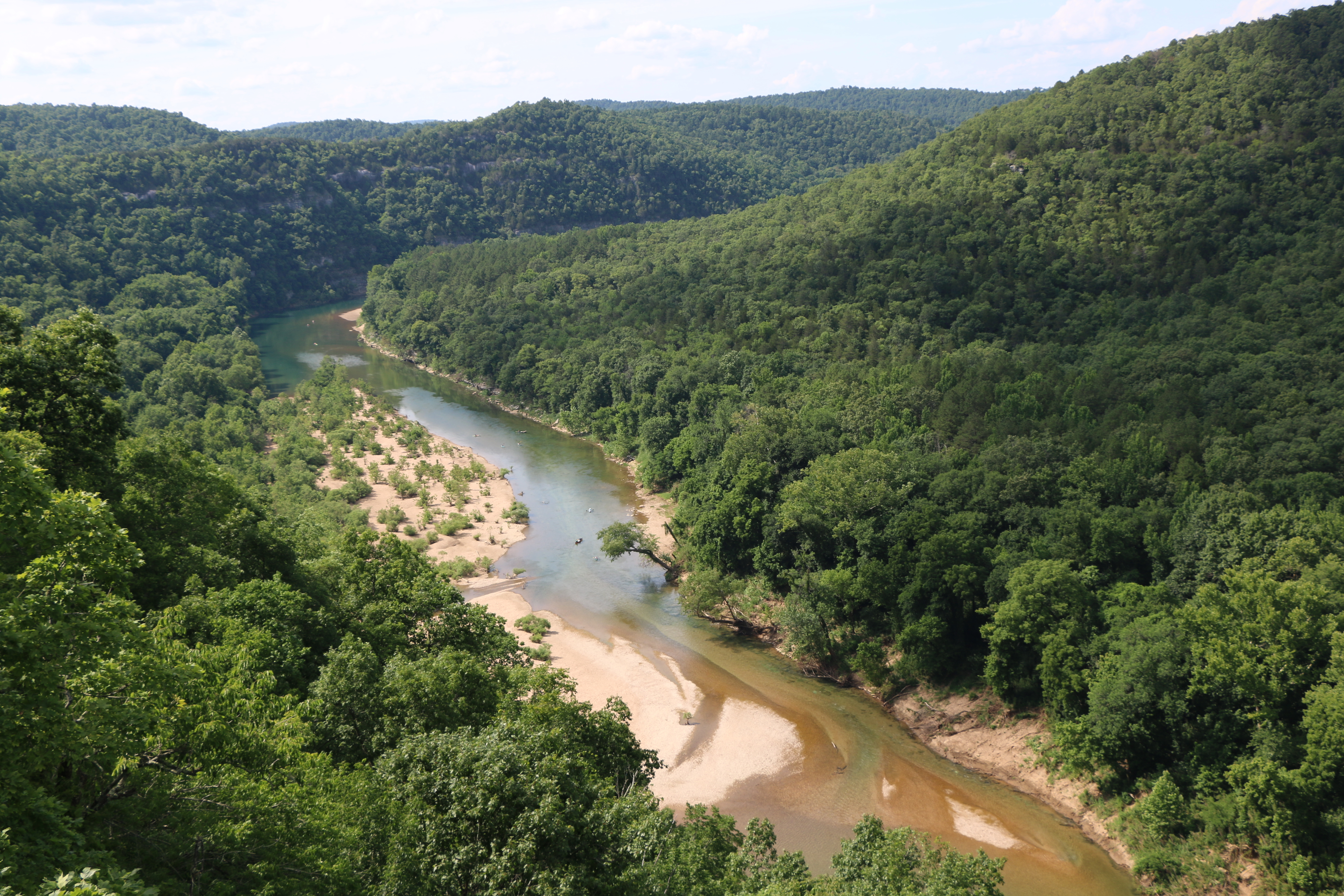
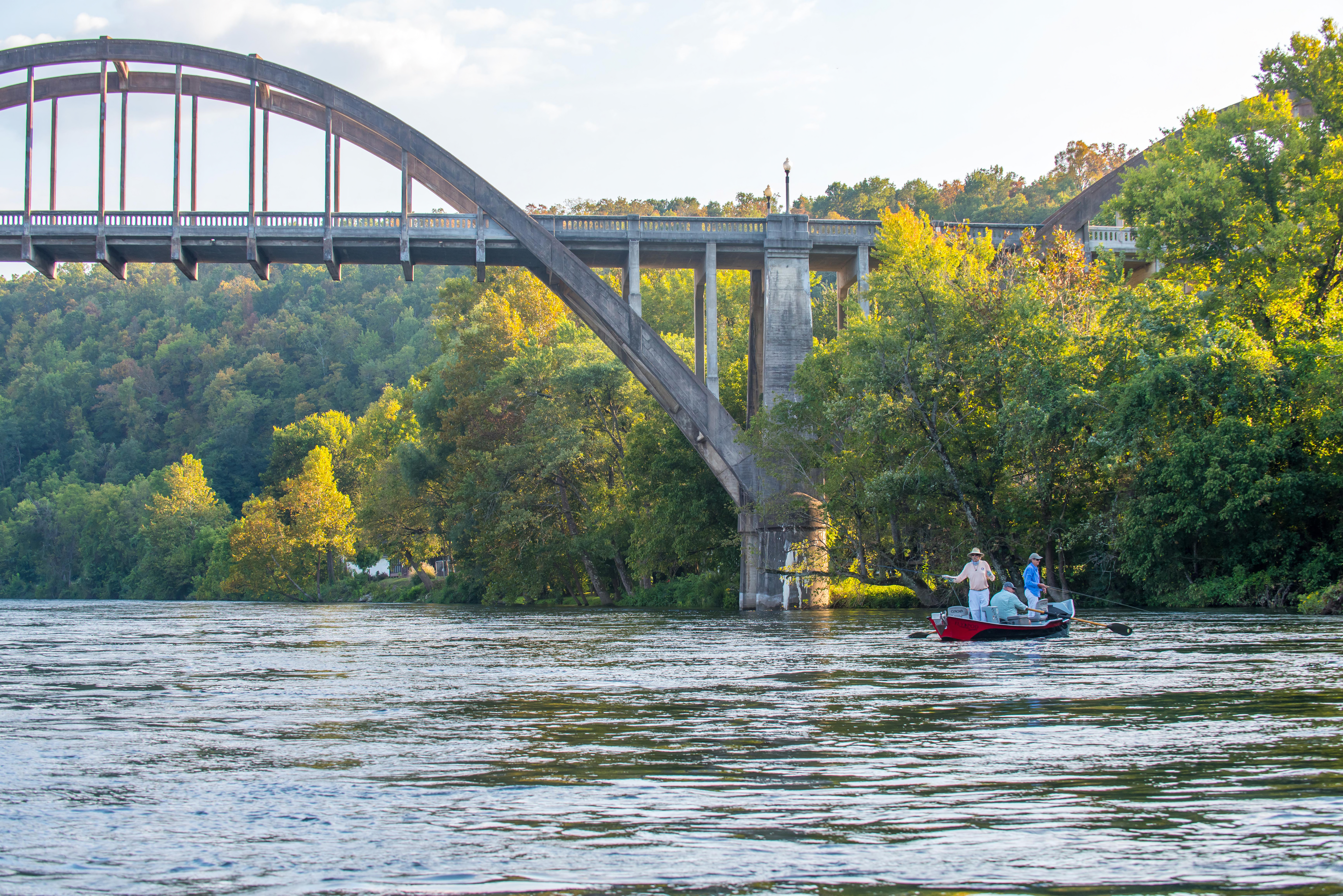
- From top: Bull Shoals Lake, Marion County Courthouse in Yellville, the Buffalo National River crossing through the Ozark Mountains in the Lower Buffalo Wilderness, fly fishing on the White River near the Cotter Bridge

- Location within the U.S. state of Arkansas
- Coordinates: 36°16′47″N 92°42′57″W
- Country: United States
- State: Arkansas
- Founded: September 25, 1836
- Named for: Francis Marion
- Seat: Yellville
- Largest city: Bull Shoals

Area
  - Total: 640 sq mi (1,700 km^{2})
  - Land: 597 sq mi (1,550 km^{2})
  - Water: 43 sq mi (110 km^{2}) 6.8%

Population (2020)
  - Total: 16,826
  - Estimate (2025): 17,593 ▲
  - Density: 28.2/sq mi (10.9/km^{2})
- Time zone: UTC−6 (Central)
  - Summer (DST): UTC−5 (CDT)
- Congressional district: 1st
- Website: marioncounty.arkansas.gov

Marion County (and Township) is located in the Ozark Mountains in the U.S. state of Arkansas. The county is named for Francis Marion, the famous "Swamp Fox" of the Revolutionary War. Created as Arkansas's 35th county in 1836, Marion County is home to one incorporated town and four incorporated cities, including Yellville, the county seat. The county is also the site of numerous unincorporated communities and ghost towns. The county included part of what is now Searcy County, Arkansas, with many opposing to dividing them, which helped fuel the bloody Tutt-Everett War between 1844 and 1850.

Occupying 640 square miles (170,000 ha), the county's population was 16,826 as of the 2020 Census. Based on population, the county ranks 42nd of the 75 in Arkansas. In the Ozarks, the county is largely covered with rugged terrain and waterways, with the exception of King's Prairie in the southwestern portion. It is drained by the White River, Buffalo River, Crooked Creek, and the Little North Fork of White River. Protected areas of the county include Bull Shoals-White River State Park, Ozark National Forest, the Buffalo National River and four wildlife management areas (WMAs).

Although there are no Interstate highways in Marion County, two United States highways (U.S. Route 62 [US 62] and US 412) and eight Arkansas state highways run in the county.

== History ==
Prior to white settlement, the Ozark Plateau was inhabited by the Osage Indians for centuries. Present-day Arkansas was under French rule from 1682 until the Spanish took over in 1762. The territory was returned to France in 1800 and then sold to the United States as part of the Louisiana Purchase in 1803. In 1812, the Territory of Missouri was formed, containing all of the Louisiana Purchase except the modern state of Louisiana. To manage this expansive and sparsely populated territory, counties were formed. New Madrid County, Missouri covered much of southeastern Missouri and the northern part of Arkansas. This county was eventually subdivided into Lawrence County, which was later subdivided into Izard County.

Marion County was formerly home to a large zinc mining industry. The ruins of the Rush Creek mining district are preserved as the Rush Historic District, which is listed on the National Register of Historic Places.

== Geography ==
According to the US Census Bureau, the county has a total area of 640 square miles (1,700 km^{2}), of which 597 square miles (1,550 km^{2}) is land and 43 square miles (110 km^{2}) (6.8%) is water.

=== Adjacent counties ===
- Ozark County, Missouri (north)
- Baxter County (east)
- Searcy County (south)
- Boone County (west)
- Taney County, Missouri (northwest)

=== National protected areas ===
- Buffalo National River (part)
- Buffalo National River Wilderness
- Ozark National Forest (part)

== Demographics ==
Historical population
Census	Pop.	Note	%±
1840	1,325		—
1850	2,308		74.2%
1860	6,192		168.3%
1870	3,979		−35.7%
1880	7,907		98.7%
1890	10,390		31.4%
1900	11,377		9.5%
1910	10,203		−10.3%
1920	10,154		−0.5%
1930	8,876		−12.6%
1940	9,464		6.6%
1950	8,609		−9.0%
1960	6,041		−29.8%
1970	7,000		15.9%
1980	11,334		61.9%
1990	12,001		5.9%
2000	16,140		34.5%
2010	16,653		3.2%
2020	16,826		1.0%
2025 (est.)	17,593	▲	4.6%
U.S. Decennial Census; 1790–1960 1900–1990; 1990–2000 2010

=== 2020 census ===
As of the 2020 census, the county had a population of 16,826. The median age was 52.8 years. 17.9% of residents were under the age of 18 and 28.9% of residents were 65 years of age or older. For every 100 females there were 100.4 males, and for every 100 females age 18 and over there were 99.7 males age 18 and over.

The racial makeup of the county was 92.5% White, 0.1% Black or African American, 0.8% American Indian and Alaska Native, 0.3% Asian, <0.1% Native Hawaiian and Pacific Islander, 0.5% from some other race, and 5.7% from two or more races. Hispanic or Latino residents of any race comprised 2.3% of the population.

<0.1% of residents lived in urban areas, while 100.0% lived in rural areas.

There were 7,480 households in the county, of which 21.2% had children under the age of 18 living in them. Of all households, 49.8% were married-couple households, 20.9% were households with a male householder and no spouse or partner present, and 22.9% were households with a female householder and no spouse or partner present. About 31.1% of all households were made up of individuals and 17.3% had someone living alone who was 65 years of age or older.

There were 9,461 housing units, of which 20.9% were vacant. Among occupied housing units, 79.5% were owner-occupied and 20.5% were renter-occupied. The homeowner vacancy rate was 2.3% and the rental vacancy rate was 11.1%.

=== 2000 census ===
As of the 2000 census, there were 16,140 people, 6,776 households, and 4,871 families residing in the county. The population density was 27 people per square mile (10 people/km^{2}). There were 8,235 housing units at an average density of 14 per square mile (5.4/km^{2}). The racial makeup of the county was 97.52% White, 0.12% Black or African American, 0.76% Native American, 0.20% Asian, 0.05% Pacific Islander, 0.13% from other races, and 1.22% from two or more races. 0.76% of the population were Hispanic or Latino of any race.

There were 6,776 households, out of which 26.00% had children under the age of 18 living with them, 61.30% were married couples living together, 7.40% had a female householder with no husband present, and 28.10% were non-families. 24.90% of all households were made up of individuals, and 12.40% had someone living alone who was 65 years of age or older. The average household size was 2.36 and the average family size was 2.79.

In the county, the population was spread out, with 22.10% under the age of 18, 6.00% from 18 to 24, 23.30% from 25 to 44, 28.50% from 45 to 64, and 20.00% who were 65 years of age or older. The median age was 44 years. For every 100 females there were 97.90 males. For every 100 females age 18 and over, there were 94.80 males. The median income for a household in the county was $26,737, and the median income for a family was $32,181. Males had a median income of $22,877 versus $17,729 for females. The per capita income for the county was $14,588. About 11.50% of families and 15.20% of the population were below the poverty line, including 23.50% of those under age 18 and 14.40% of those age 65 or over.

== Government ==
The county government is a constitutional body granted specific powers by the Constitution of Arkansas and the Arkansas Code. The quorum court is the legislative branch of the county government and controls all spending and revenue collection. Representatives are called justices of the peace and are elected from county districts every even-numbered year. The number of districts in a county vary from nine to fifteen, and district boundaries are drawn by the county election commission. The Marion County Quorum Court has nine members. Presiding over quorum court meetings is the county judge, who serves as the chief operating officer of the county. The county judge is elected at-large and does not vote in quorum court business, although capable of vetoing quorum court decisions.

Marion County, Arkansas Elected countywide officials
Position	Officeholder	Party
County Judge	Jason Stumph	Republican
County/Circuit Clerk	Dawn Moffet	Republican
Sheriff	Gregg Alexander	Republican
Treasurer	Susann Crespino	Republican
Collector	Carla Purdome	Republican
Assessor	Tanya Eppes	Republican
Coroner	James H. Collins	Republican
Surveyor	Keith A. Sullivan	Republican
Constable	Mike Moffet	Republican

The composition of the Quorum Court following the 2024 elections is 9 Republicans. Justices of the Peace (members) of the Quorum Court following the elections are:

- District 1: Chuck Van Velkinburgh (R)
- District 2: Sandra L. Lee (R)
- District 3: Travis Hopson (R)
- District 4: Kolton Jensen (R)
- District 5: John D. Reed (R)
- District 6: Leslie Kerwood (R)
- District 7: Marion Wesley Shipman (R)
- District 8: Tommy Dorsey (R)
- District 9: Tommy Dean Johnson (R)

=== Politics ===
Over the past few election cycles Marion County has trended heavily towards the GOP. The last Democrat to carry this county was Bill Clinton in 1996.

United States presidential election results for Marion County, Arkansas
Year	Republican		Democratic		Third party(ies)	
Year	No.	%	No.	%	No.	%
1896	336	21.32%	1,212	76.90%	28	1.78%
1900	375	29.16%	905	70.37%	6	0.47%
1904	356	37.39%	580	60.92%	16	1.68%
1908	370	31.92%	705	60.83%	84	7.25%
1912	160	16.02%	537	53.75%	302	30.23%
1916	274	25.97%	781	74.03%	0	0.00%
1920	371	28.60%	744	57.36%	182	14.03%
1924	282	21.56%	825	63.07%	201	15.37%
1928	436	37.17%	731	62.32%	6	0.51%
1932	235	14.70%	1,282	80.18%	82	5.13%
1936	435	30.21%	989	68.68%	16	1.11%
1940	320	26.64%	864	71.94%	17	1.42%
1944	414	32.65%	842	66.40%	12	0.95%
1948	381	24.41%	1,133	72.58%	47	3.01%
1952	844	43.06%	1,099	56.07%	17	0.87%
1956	857	44.59%	1,061	55.20%	4	0.21%
1960	1,016	50.60%	968	48.21%	24	1.20%
1964	1,088	39.43%	1,661	60.20%	10	0.36%
1968	1,385	42.59%	990	30.44%	877	26.97%
1972	2,331	66.66%	1,108	31.68%	58	1.66%
1976	2,045	40.70%	2,979	59.30%	0	0.00%
1980	3,059	57.11%	2,046	38.20%	251	4.69%
1984	3,545	64.17%	1,945	35.21%	34	0.62%
1988	2,993	57.80%	2,033	39.26%	152	2.94%
1992	2,023	32.39%	2,757	44.15%	1,465	23.46%
1996	2,312	37.75%	2,735	44.65%	1,078	17.60%
2000	3,402	56.56%	2,233	37.12%	380	6.32%
2004	4,127	60.10%	2,602	37.89%	138	2.01%
2008	4,524	63.17%	2,384	33.29%	254	3.55%
2012	4,774	67.71%	2,037	28.89%	240	3.40%
2016	5,336	75.08%	1,434	20.18%	337	4.74%
2020	5,783	77.08%	1,531	20.41%	189	2.52%
2024	6,230	79.35%	1,501	19.12%	120	1.53%

=== Taxation ===
Property tax is assessed by the Marion County Assessor annually based upon the fair market value of the property and determining which tax rate, commonly called a millage in Arkansas, will apply. The rate depends upon the property's location with respect to city limits, school district, and special tax increment financing (TIF) districts. This tax is collected by the Marion County Collector between the first business day of March of each year through October 15 without penalty. The Marion County Treasurer disburses tax revenues to various government agencies, such as cities, county road departments, fire departments, libraries, and police departments in accordance with the budget set by the quorum court.

Sales and use taxes in Arkansas are voter approved and collected by the Arkansas Department of Finance and Administration. Arkansas's statewide sales and use tax has been 6.5% since July 1, 2013. Marion County has an additional sales and use tax of 1.75%, which has been in effect since April 1, 2017. Within Marion County, the five municipalities each also have additional sales and use tax: Bull Shoals and Yellville levy an additional 2%, Flippin and Summit 1%, and Pyatt 0.5%. The Arkansas State Treasurer disburses state tax revenue to counties/cities in accordance with tax rules.

== Communities ==
=== Townships ===
Because of the low population, Marion County has only one township, "Marion County Township", which encompasses the entire county. Hence all cities, towns and other places are in Marion County Township. Townships in Arkansas are the divisions of a county. Each township includes unincorporated areas; some may have incorporated cities or towns within part of their boundaries. Arkansas townships have limited purposes in modern times. However, the United States census does list Arkansas population based on townships (sometimes referred to as "county subdivisions" or "minor civil divisions"). Townships are also of value for historical purposes in terms of genealogical research. Each town or city is within one or more townships in an Arkansas county based on census maps and publications. The townships of Marion County are listed below; listed in parentheses are the cities, towns, and/or census-designated places that are fully or partially inside the township.

- Marion County

=== Cities ===
- Bull Shoals
- Flippin
- Summit
- Yellville (county seat)

=== Town ===
- Pyatt

=== Census-designated places ===
- Oakland

== Infrastructure ==
=== Major highways ===
- US 62 / US 412
  - U.S. Route 62 Business
  - U.S. Route 62 Spur
- Highway 14
- Highway 101
- Highway 125
- Highway 178
- Highway 202
- Highway 206
- Highway 235
- Highway 268
- Airport Highway 980

== Education ==
School districts include:

- Flippin School District
- Lead Hill School District
- Mountain Home School District
- Norfork Schools
- Ozark Mountain School District
- Searcy County School District
- Yellville-Summit School District

The Oakland School District consolidated into the Mountain Home district on July 1, 1986. The Bruno-Pyatt School District consolidated into the Ozark Mountain School District on July 1, 2004.

== See also ==
- List of lakes in Marion County, Arkansas
- National Register of Historic Places listings in Marion County, Arkansas
