= Sylamore Scenic Byway =

Scenic highway in Arkansas, USA

Sylamore Scenic Byway

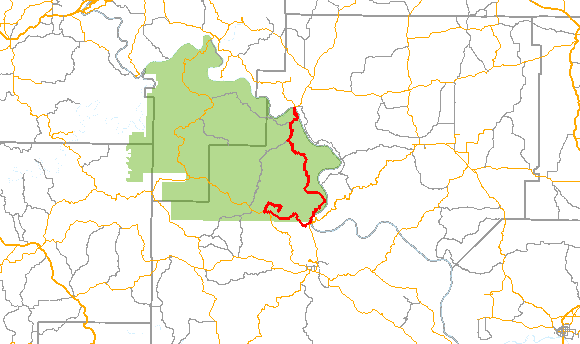
- Sylamore Scenic Byway; Sylamore Scenic Byway State highways

Route information
- Maintained by ArDOT
- Length: 26.5 mi (42.6 km)
- Existed: February 8, 1989–present

Major junctions
- South end: FSR 1110 at Blanchard Springs Caverns
- North end: AR 5 / AR 9 at Calico Rock

Location
- Country: United States
- State: Arkansas
- Counties: Stone

Highway system
- Scenic Byways; National; National Forest; BLM; NPS; Arkansas Highway System; Interstate; US; State; Business; Spurs; Suffixed; Scenic; Heritage

The Sylamore Scenic Byway is a scenic route in the Arkansas Scenic Byways program. The route runs through the Sylamore Ranger District of the Ozark National Forest in Arkansas for 26.5 miles (42.6 km) in Stone County. It passes through undeveloped forest land as a scenic route to Blanchard Springs Caverns.

== Route description ==
The Sylamore Scenic Byway begins at the National Forest Service Blanchard Springs Caverns Visitor Center. The Mirror Lake Historic District is listed on the National Register of Historic Places. The route runs west along Forest Highway 1110. It turns onto Highway 14, which winds east past an intersection with Highway 87 to Allison near the White River. The Sylamore Creek Byway begins an overlap with Highway 5 and Highway 9 northbound, following the White River and passing the Miles Jeffery Barn. It passes through Optimus, an unincorporated community, before terminating at a bridge over the White River.

== History ==
The Sylamore Scenic Byway was designated as a National Forest Scenic Byway on February 8, 1989.

== Major intersections ==
County	Location	mi	km	Destinations	Notes
Stone	Blanchard Springs	0.0	0.0	Byway begins at FSR 1110	Southern terminus
Stone				AR 14 west – Fifty-Six, Yellville	End FS 1110 overlap, begin AR 14 overlap
Stone	Allison	7.1	11.4	AR 5 south / AR 9 south / AR 14 east – Mountain View, Melbourne	Begin AR 5/AR 9 overlap, end AR 14 overlap,
White River		26.5	42.6	Stone–Izard county line; northern terminus	
Izard		26.5	42.6	AR 5 / AR 9	Continuation into Izard County
1.000 mi = 1.609 km; 1.000 km = 0.621 mi: Concurrency terminus

== Gallery ==
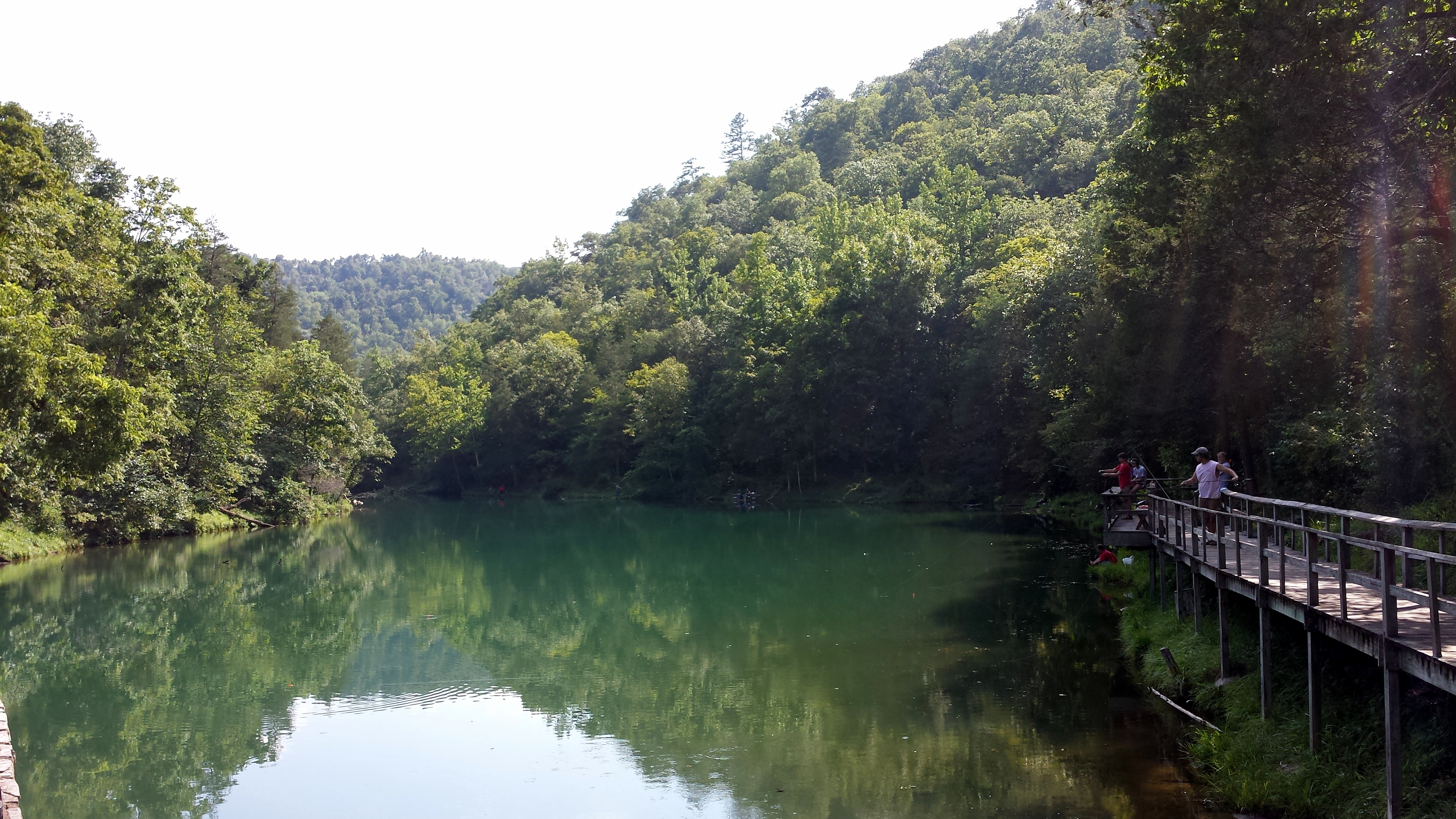
Mirror Lake Historic District

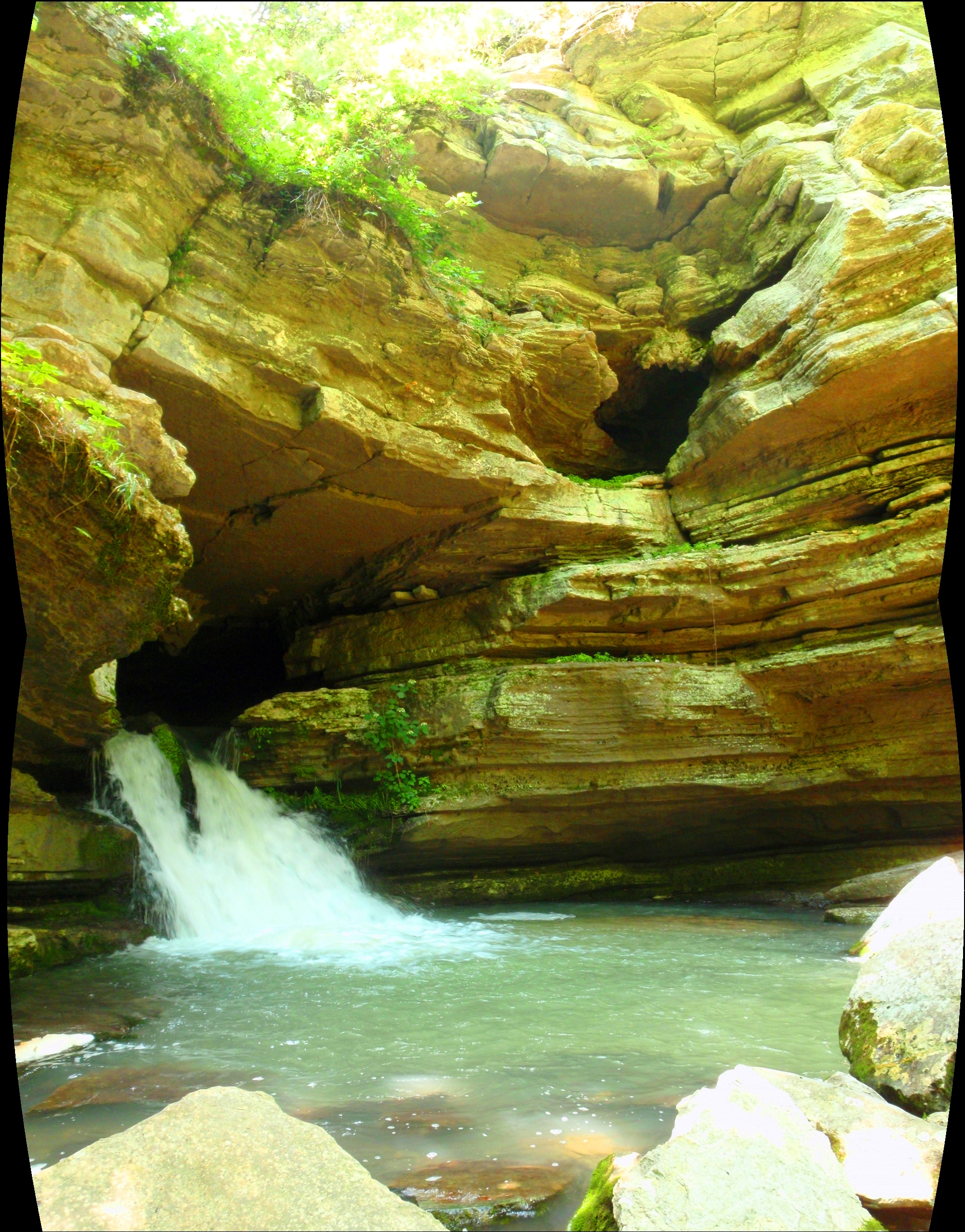
Blanchard Springs

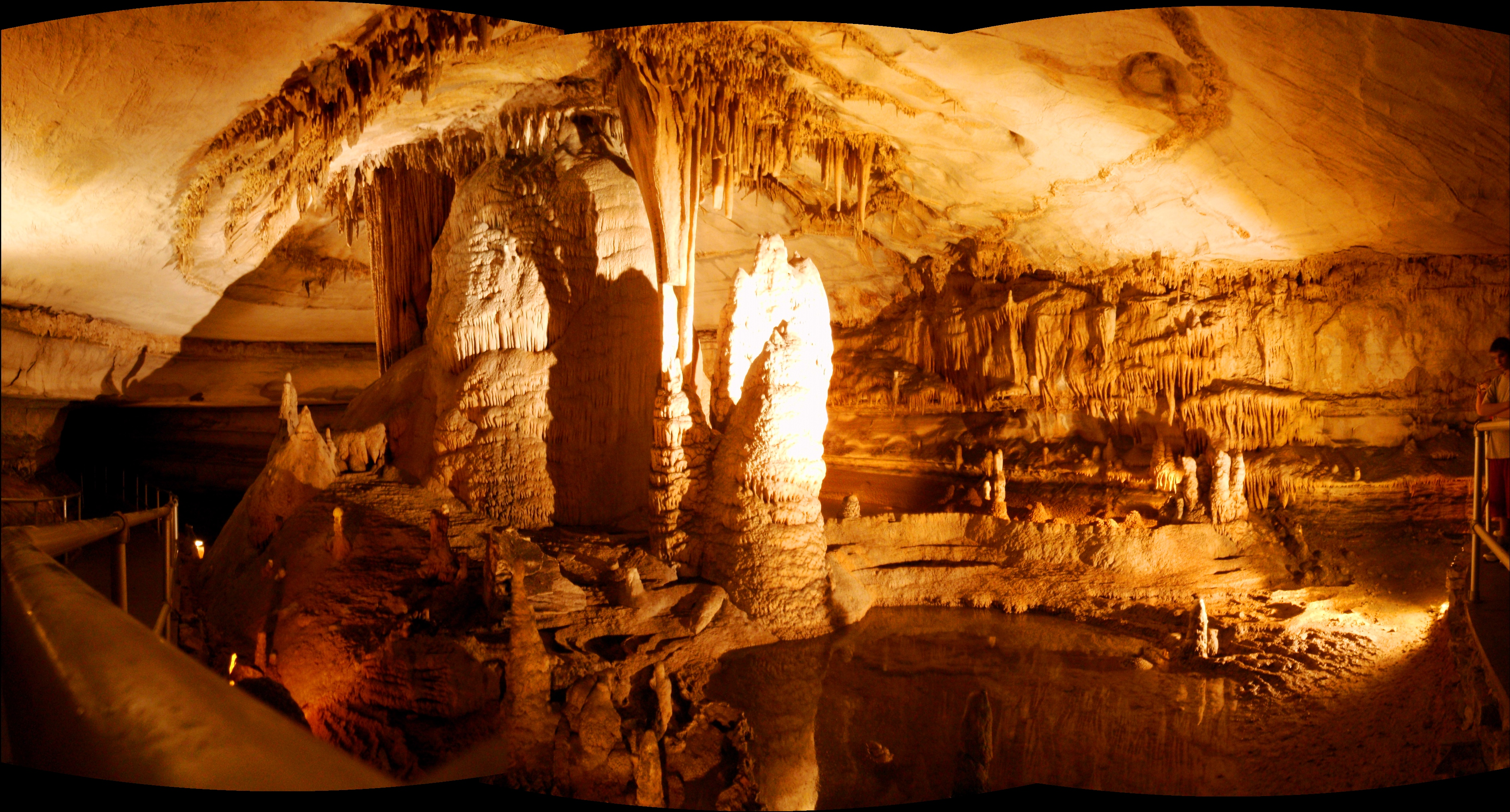
Blanchard Springs Caverns

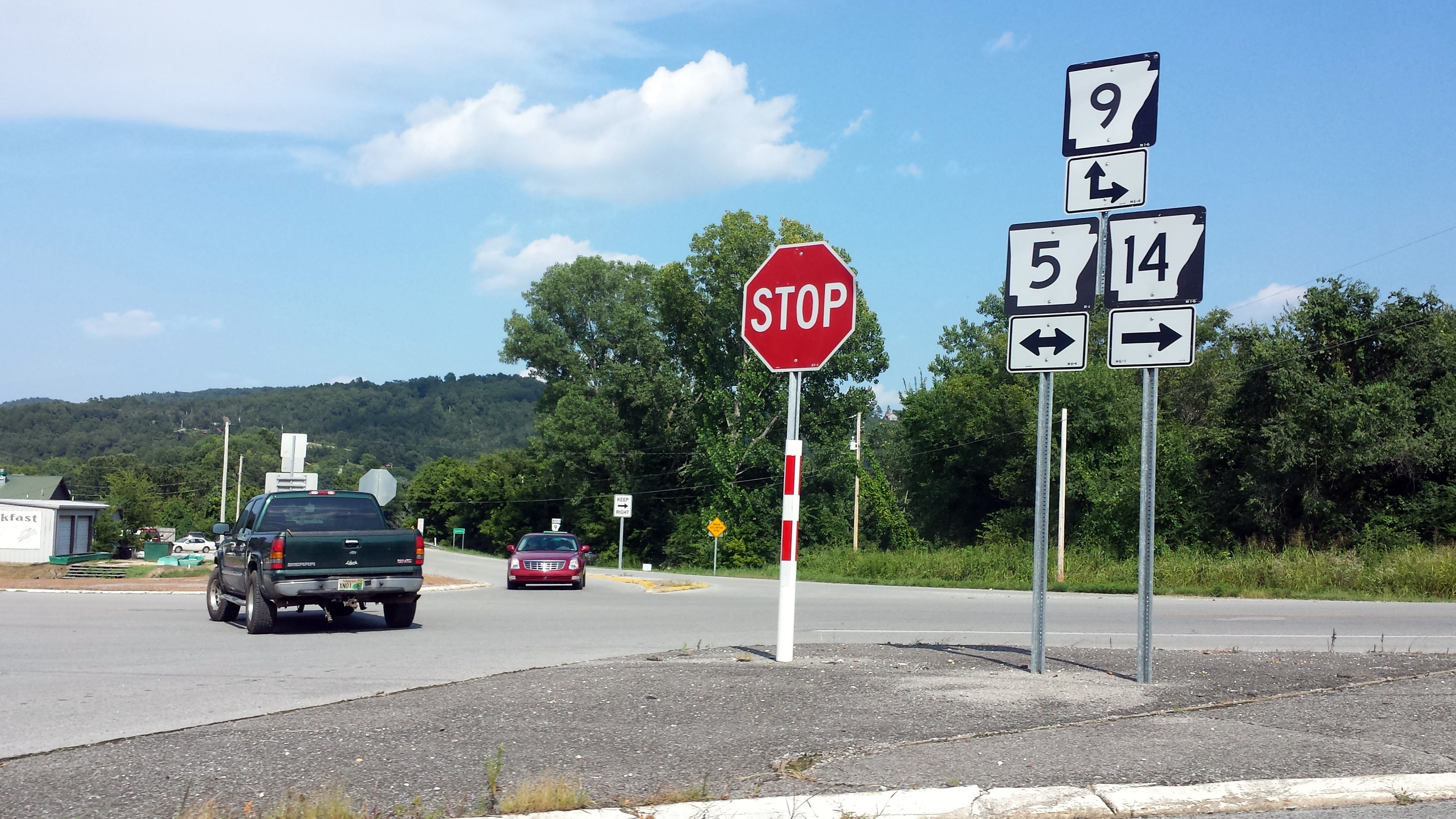
Byway turns left

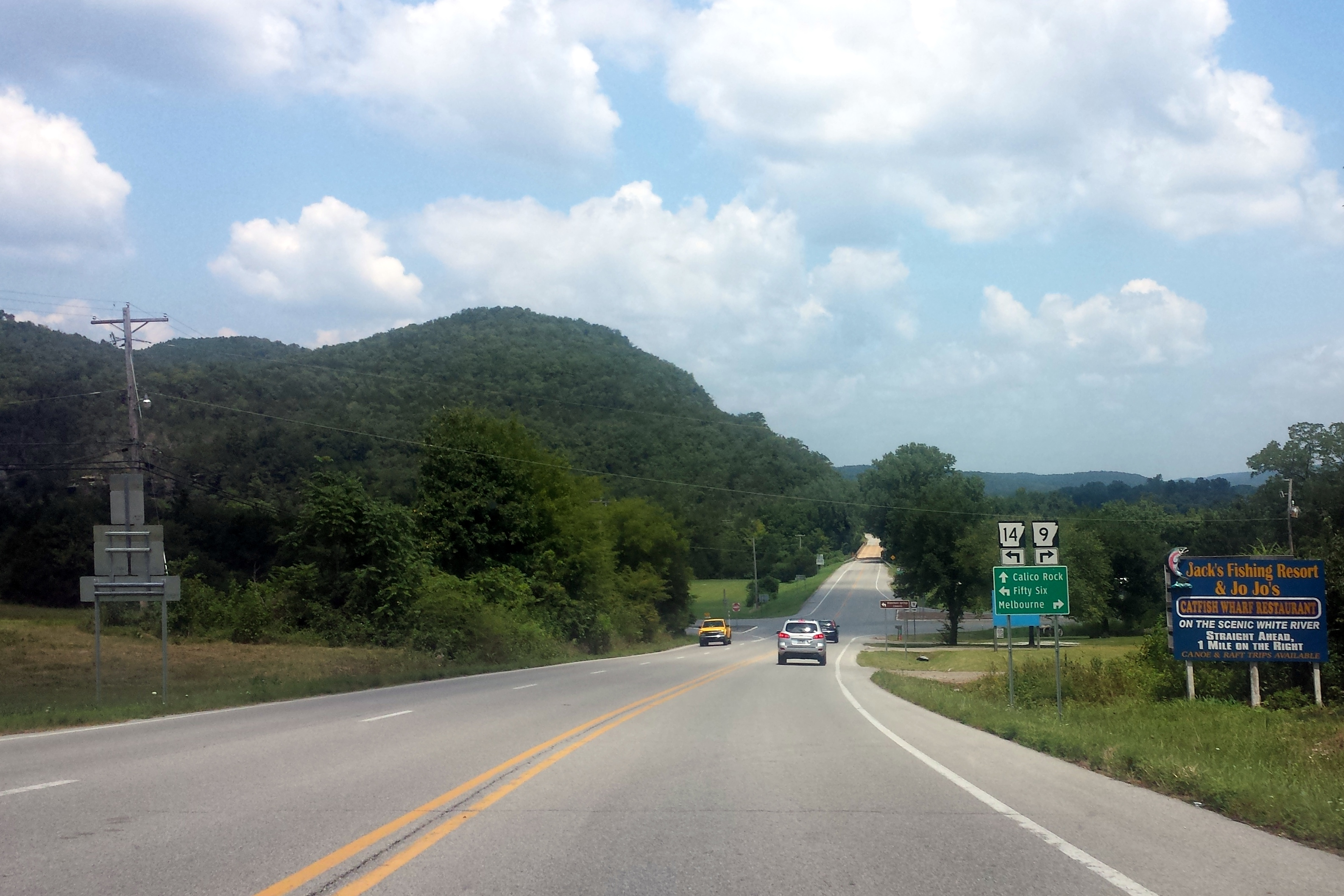
The Byway

== See also ==
- List of Arkansas state highways
