= Arkansas Highway 14 =

Highway in Arkansas

Highway 14

Route information
- Maintained by ArDOT
- Existed: 1926–present

Section 1
- Length: 208.12 mi (334.94 km)
- West end: Boat Dock Road near Table Rock Lake
- Major intersections: AR 7 in Lead Hill; US 62 / US 412 in Yellville; US 167 / AR 25 in Southside; I-57 / US 67 / AR 224 near Newport; US 49 / US 63 in Waldenburg
- East end: I-555 at Payneway

Section 2
- Length: 19.23 mi (30.95 km)
- West end: AR 140 in Lepanto
- Major intersections: I-55 near Marie; US 61 in Wilson
- East end: CR S449 at Golden Lake

Location
- Country: United States
- State: Arkansas
- Counties: Boone, Marion, Searcy, Baxter, Stone, Independence, Jackson, Poinsett, Mississippi

Highway system
- Arkansas Highway System; Interstate; US; State; Business; Spurs; Suffixed; Scenic; Heritage
← AR 13	→ AR 15

Arkansas Highway 14 (AR 14) is a designation for two state highways in the U.S. state of Arkansas. One segment of 208.12 miles (334.94 km) begins east of Table Rock Lake and runs east to Interstate 555 (I-555) at Payneway. A second segment of 19.23 miles (30.95 km) runs from Highway 140 in Lepanto east to Mississippi CR S449 at Golden Lake. Segments of the highway are part of two Arkansas Scenic Byways: Sylamore Scenic Byway in the Ozark National Forest and the Crowley's Ridge Parkway atop Crowley's Ridge.

The highway's general alignment between the western terminus and Marked Tree closely follows the original routing as established in the initial 1926 Arkansas state highway numbering plan. The route from Lepanto east across I-55 to Golden Lake is a later extension.

== Route description ==
=== Table Rock Lake to Payneway ===
Highway 14 begins in the Ozark Mountains east of Table Rock Lake as a continuation of Boat Dock Road and runs east to an intersection with U.S. Route 65 (US 65) 0.7 miles (1.1 km) south of Ridgedale, Missouri. US 65 and Highway 14 form a concurrency southbound along the four-lane divided highway. After 0.7 miles (1.1 km), Highway 14 turns from US 65 toward the small community of Omaha, ending the concurrency. As the road approaches Main Street in Omaha, Highway 14 turns east and exits the city. Highway 14 winds east through a rural part of Boone County, passing through the unincorporated community of New Hope and crossing Charley Creek and Bear Creek. Highway 14 begins to roughly parallel Bull Shoals Lake toward Lead Hill; upon entering the city, Highway 14 forms a concurrency with Highway 7 through Lead Hill which ends just south of the city limits. Highway 14 continues east into Marion County; crossing East Sugarloaf Creek and serving as the western terminus of Highway 268 just east of the county line.

The highway curves southward away from Bull Shoals Lake and into the rural Ozarks; it winds through Monarch to a junction with Highway 125. Highway 14 continues south past the Slippery Hollow Natural Area, a preserved area of caves serving as habitat the Ozark big-eared bat and other endangered species and the unincorporated community of Lakeway before a junction with another segment of Highway 125. Highway 14 curves eastward, entering the small town of Summit from the north and becomes Main Street. In Summit, Highway 14 crosses over the Missouri and Northern Arkansas Railroad tracks, becomes a section line road, and meets Highway 202 (Park Avenue) at a four-way stop intersection. Continuing south, Highway 14 passes within two blocks of the Marion County Fairgrounds before entering Yellville, the county seat of Marion County. Now designated Panther Avenue, the road passes Yellville–Summit High School and Central Ozarks Medical Center before curving through a residential section of town and intersecting US 62 and US 412 in downtown Yellville.

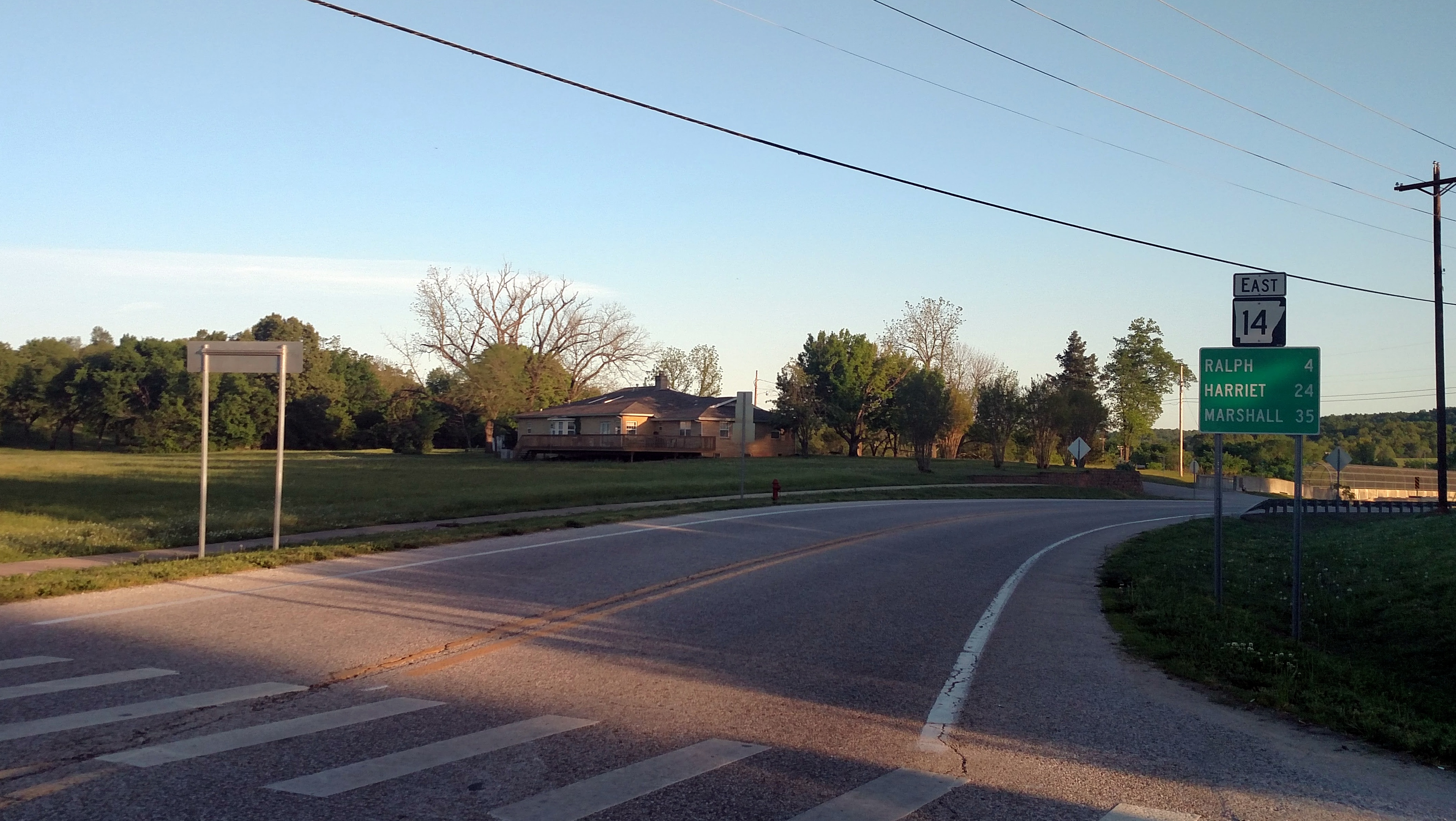
First reassurance marker east of US 62/US 412 in Yellville

The three routes form a concurrency eastbound along Main Street, passing through the historic commercial center of Yellville, including the Marion County Courthouse. US 62/US 412/Highway 14 bridge the East Prong Town Branch before Highway 14 turns south, ending the concurrency. Highway 14 bridges Crooked Creek and passes Yellville City Park before serving as the northern terminus of Highway 235 and departing Yellville to the south. The highway runs south through a rural area, serving as the western terminus of Highway 206 near Ralph and Highway 268 near Mull before entering the Buffalo National River protected area, bridging the namesake river, and crossing into Searcy County.

Highway 14 passes through the northeast corner of Searcy County; a sparsely populated part of the Ozark Mountains. The highway exits the Buffalo National River area and passes near Loafer's Glory Wildlife Management Area near Evening Star. Continuing south, Highway 14 serves as the northern terminus of Highway 27 at a t-intersection at Harriet, with Highway 14 turning left to continue eastbound into Baxter County. The highway enters the small town of Big Flat, serving as the northern terminus of Highway 263 and passing two school buildings (Tri-County High School and the Big Flat School Gymnasium) before exiting the city to the east. Highway 14 enters the Ozark National Forest and serves as the southern terminus of Highway 341 before exiting the county eastbound into Stone County.

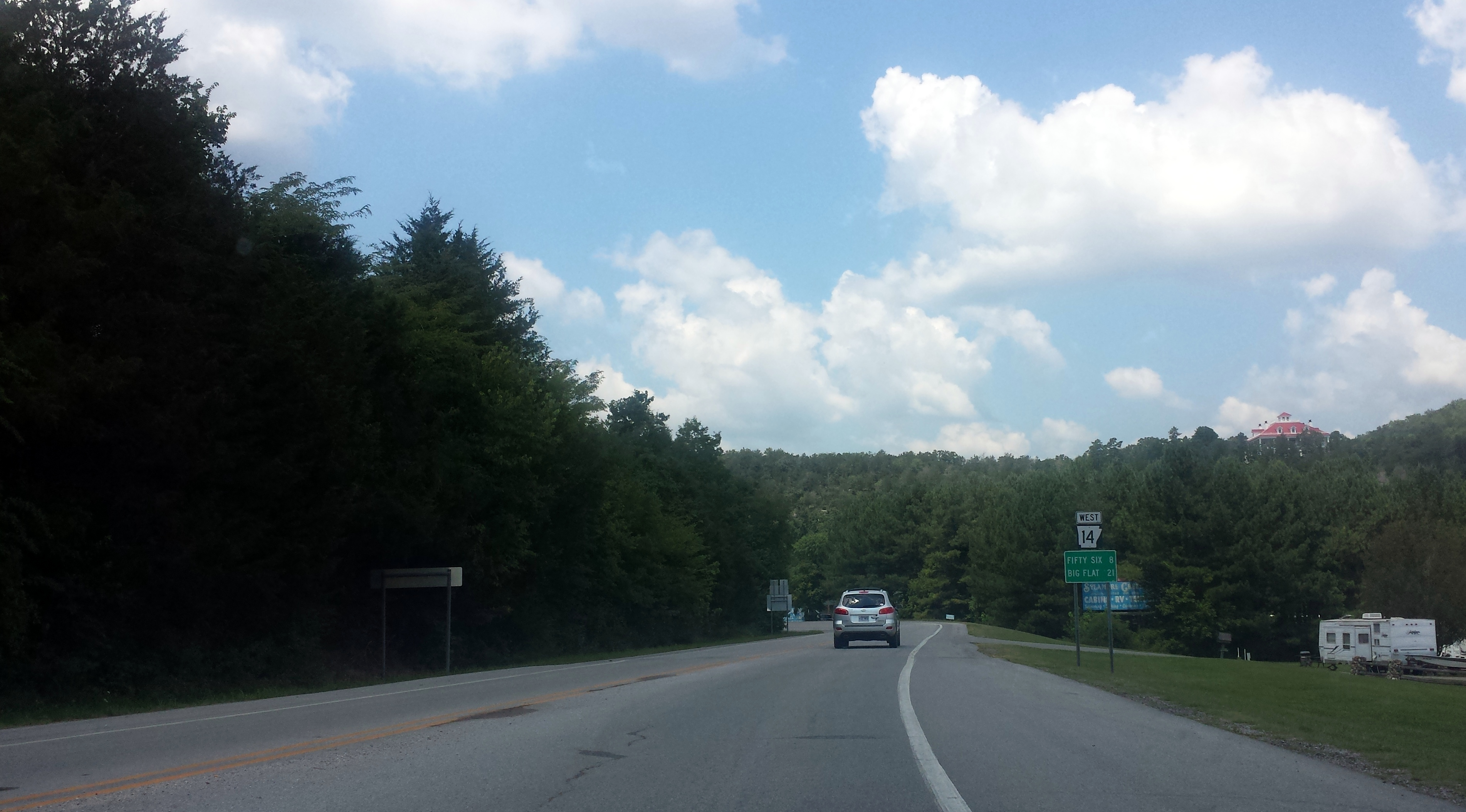
Highway 14 north of Mountain View

Continuing through the Ozark National Forest, Highway 14 enters Stone County and passes through the small town of Fifty-Six before an intersection with Forest Service Road 1110. At this intersection, the route becomes part of the Sylamore Scenic Byway, a National Forest Scenic Byway and Arkansas Scenic Byway. The designation follows Highway 14 through a popular tourist area, serving the Mirror Lake Historic District, Blanchard Springs Caverns, and the Gunner Pool Recreation Area. The highway serves as the northern terminus of Highway 87 and winds eastward to a junction with Highway 5 and Highway 9; two north–south highways running concurrently, at Allison near the White River. Highway 14 joins the concurrency southbound into Mountain View, with the Sylamore Scenic Byway turning north toward Calico Rock.

In Mountain View, the county seat of Stone County, the three-route concurrency ends at a T-intersection with Main Street; Highway 9 turns west, with Highway 5 and Highway 14 turning east together. The two routes serve a commercial area of the city, including the Mountain View Airport, Sylamore Ranger District Office of the Ozark National Forest, Mountain View High School, and the Stone County Medical Center before Highway 5 turns south, ending the concurrency. Highway 14 continues eastbound through rural Stone County, passing through sparsely populated and forested Ozarks hills, serving as the western terminus for Highway 58 before beginning a stretch passing several historic properties listed on the National Register of Historic Places: the John Bettis House in Pleasant Grove, and six properties in Marcella, including: the H.J. Doughtery House, Marcella Church & School, Thomas E. Hess House, and the Binks Hess House and Barn, as well as the Taylor-Stokes House and Walter Gray House near Melrose.

The highway enters Independence County, running between the White River and the Foushee Cave Natural Area and crossing Rocky Creek before an intersection with Highway 25 at the unincorporated community of Locust Grove. The two routes form a concurrency heading east to the small town of Southside just south of Batesville, where Highway 14 breaks from the concurrency at a junction with US 167. Highway 14 continues south as Allen Chapel Road through Southside before exiting the city. Near Salado, Highway 14 serves as the eastern terminus of Highway 14S, which runs west into Southside. The route continues eastward, roughly paralleling the White River toward Oil Trough. The highway crosses Salado Creek and Goodie Creek, both tributaries of the White River, before serving as the northern terminus of Highway 157 west of Oil Trough. Within the city, Highway 14 serves as Main Street and passes the historic Hankins' Store before exiting eastbound. Highway 14 continues east to serve as the western terminus of Highway 122 before entering Jackson County.

Highway 14 passes through the unincorporated community of Macks before an intersection with Highway 367; these two routes form a concurrency eastbound toward Newport. Together they span the White River and the Union Pacific Railroad tracks before turning sharply onto Third Street and running downtown. The highways pass the Jackson County Courthouse and the Arkansas Rock N Roll Highway 67 Museum in downtown. Continuing east, the highways serve as the southern terminus of Highway 69 before becoming Malcom Street. Highway 14 turns south at State Street, marking the end of the concurrency. Highway 14 continues south past the Newport Country Club before serving as the northern terminus of a segment of Highway 17 and exiting the city southbound. The highway curves east and interchanges with I-57/US 67 and Highway 224. Continuing eastbound, Highway 14 passes the Erwin Auxiliary Army Airfield and has another junction with Highway 17 at Erwin. Due to the roadway alignment, a short suffixed route, Highway 14Y serves as a short connector for westbound travelers turning from Highway 14 to Highway 17. The highway continues east as a section line road, serving as a northern terminus for Highway 145, bridging the Cache River, and briefly overlapping with Highway 37 at Amagon before entering Poinsett County and the Arkansas Delta.

Highway 14 runs east as a section line road, passing through the Earl Buss/Bayou Deview Wildlife Management Area and crossing Bayou DeView before an intersection with the Union Pacific Railway tracks and US 49/US 63 in Waldenburg. The highway continues east through sparsely populated agricultural lands, crossing the L'Anguille River before entering the county seat of Harrisburg. Highway 14 intersects Highway 1 and crosses the Union Pacific railroad tracks in the city before passing through the Harrisburg Commercial Historic District, which includes the Poinsett County Courthouse. The highway continues east, serving as the southern terminus of Highway 463 at Payneway before an interchange with I-555, where it terminates.

=== Lepanto to Golden Lake ===
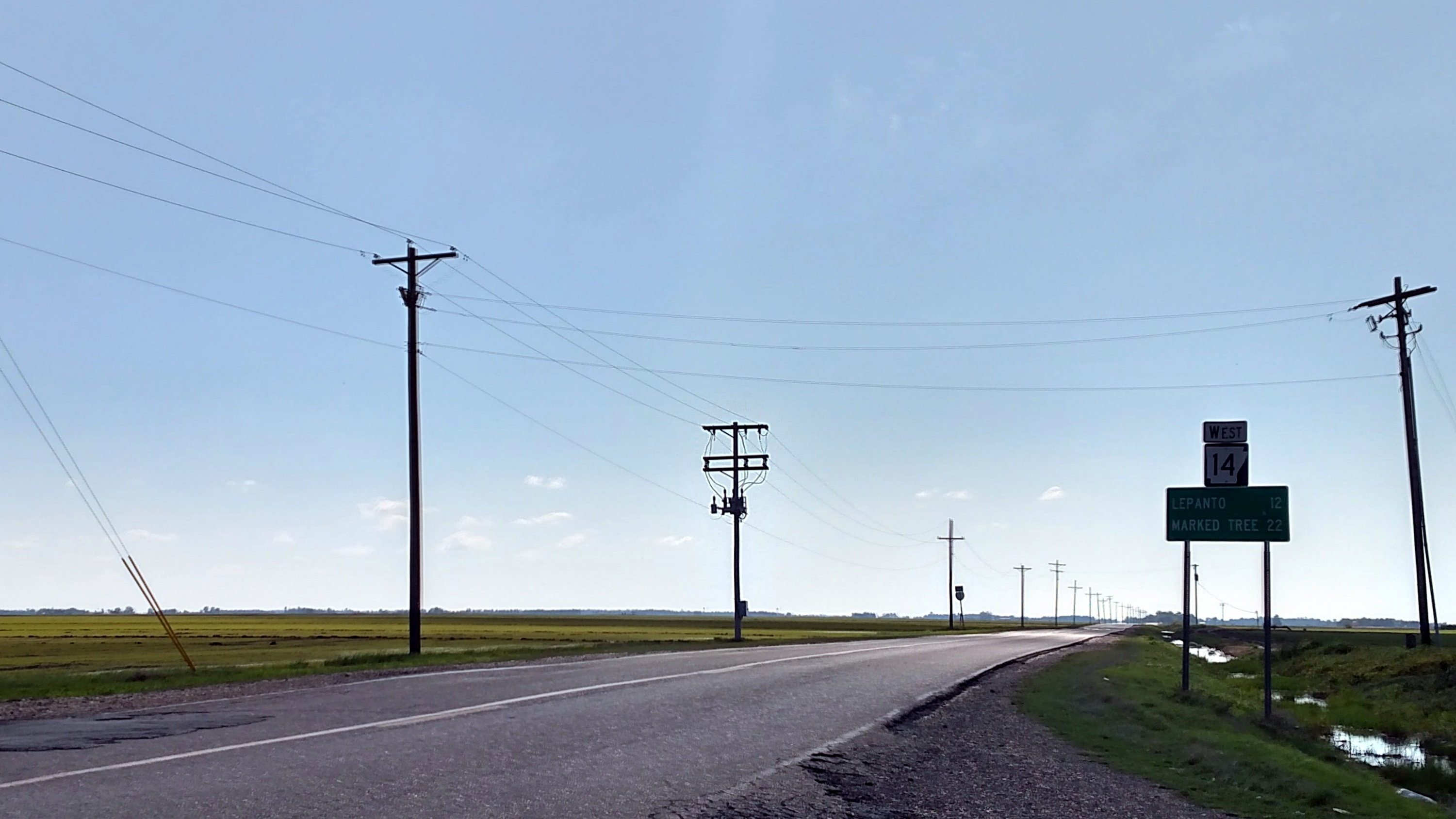
Highway 14 near Lepanto

The route begins at Highway 140 in Lepanto and runs east into Mississippi County as a section line road through sparsely populated agricultural areas. Highway 14 intersects Highway 77 and serves as the northern terminus of Highway 297 before a junction with I-55. Continuing east, Highway passes Rivercrest High School, serves as the eastern terminus of Highway 181, and enters the small town of Marie. At a junction with Highway 119, the route turns south toward Wilson. In Wilson, Highway 14 passes the Wilson Commercial Historic District and intersects US 61 (Cortez Kennedy Avenue) before exiting the city and running south to Golden Lake, where it terminates at Mississippi CR S449.

== History ==
State Road 14 was created during the 1926 Arkansas state highway numbering roughly along the current routing between Omaha and Payneway in Poinsett County. The early route included ferry service at both the Buffalo River and the White River (near Oil Trough), and a toll bridge at Newport. In 1940, Highway 14 was rerouted onto Highway 110 between Southside and Oil Trough, with the former alignment becoming part of an extended Highway 69 and Highway 122. Between 1942 and 1945, the designation was extended east to Wilson.

Following construction of the Bull Shoals Dam, three segments of Highway 14 were inundated by Bull Shoals Reservoir. Known as Bear Creek Bay and East and West Sugar Loaf Creek bays, the highway was rerouted around the lake on March 11, 1954. The former alignments remain as county roads near the lake known as "Old Hwy 14".

In 1978, Highway 14 was rerouted south of Batesville. The mainline Highway 14 was rerouted over existing Highway 25 and supplanted Highway 14A. The former Highway 14 mainline route was redesignated as Highway 230 between Locust Grove and Southside. A short original section of Highway 14 between Southside and Salado, discontinuous after the rerouting, was redesignated Highway 14 Spur.

== Major intersections ==
Mile markers reset at some concurrencies.

County	Location	mi	km	Destinations	Notes
Boone		0.000	0.000	Boat Dock Road – Table Rock Lake, Cricket Recreation Area	Continuation west
Boone		4.399	7.080	US 65 north – Springfield, MO, Branson, MO	Western end of US 65 concurrency
Boone		0.000	0.000	US 65 south – Harrison	Eastern end of US 65 concurrency
Boone		14.88	23.95	AR 281 south – Bergman	Northern terminus of AR 281
Boone		15.88	25.56	AR 281 north – Tucker Hollow Park	Southern terminus of AR 281
Boone	Lead Hill	23.19	37.32	AR 7 north – Diamond City, Lead Hill Park	Western end of AR 7 concurrency
Boone		24.37	39.22	AR 7 south – Harrison	Eastern end of AR 7 concurrency
Marion		25.54	41.10	AR 268 east	Western terminus of AR 268
Marion		32.81	52.80	AR 125 north – Peel, Buck Creek Recreation Area, Highway 125 Recreation Area	Southern terminus of AR 125
Marion		35.91	57.79	AR 125 south – Dodd City	Northern terminus of AR 125
Marion	Summit	45.97	73.98	AR 202 (Park Avenue)	
Marion	Yellville	47.714	76.788	US 62 west / US 412 west – Harrison	Western end of US 62/US 412 concurrency
Marion	Yellville	see US 62 (mile 154.8–155.1)			
Marion	Yellville	0.000	0.000	US 62 east / US 412 east – Mountain Home, Bull Shoals	Eastern end of US 62/US 412 concurrency
Marion	Yellville	0.69	1.11	AR 235 south – Bruno, Pindall	Northern terminus of AR 235
Marion	Ralph	4.28	6.89	AR 206 east	Western terminus of AR 206
Marion	Mull	14.10	22.69	AR 268 east – Buffalo Point	Western terminus of AR 268
Marion	Buffalo National River	15.75	25.35	Bridge over the Buffalo River	
Searcy	Harriet	23.52	37.85	AR 27 south – Marshall	Northern terminus of AR 27
Baxter	Big Flat	31.53	50.74	AR 263 south – Timbo	Northern terminus of AR 263
Baxter		36.55	58.82	AR 341 north (Push Mountain Road) – Mountain Home	Southern terminus of AR 341
Stone		46.56	74.93	FSR 1110 (Sylamore Scenic Byway)	
Stone		46.86	75.41	AR 87 south	Northern terminus of AR 87
Stone	Allison	53.142	85.524	AR 5 north / AR 9 north (Sylamore Scenic Byway) – Melbourne, Calico Rock	Western end of AR 5/AR 9 concurrency
Stone	see AR 5 (mile 87.85–82.11)				
Stone	Mountain View	0.000	0.000	AR 9 south (Main Street) to AR 66 – Mountain View Business District	Eastern end of AR 9 concurrency (Note: Although mileage of overlapping highways in Arkansas highways is normally counted under the route of greater importance, Highway 14, Section 7 mileage begins eastbound of the Highway 9 junction in Mountain View, with Highway 5 following as an officially designated exception.)
Stone	Mountain View	1.65	2.66	AR 5 south	Eastern end of AR 5 concurrency
Stone		7.36	11.84	AR 58 east – Guion	Western terminus of AR 58
Independence	Locust Grove	28.267	45.491	AR 25 south – Heber Springs	Western end of AR 25 concurrency (Note: Although mileage of overlapping highways in Arkansas highways is normally counted under the route of greater importance, Highway 14, Section 8 mileage ends at the Highway 25 junction, and Section 9 begins in Southside.)
Independence	Locust Grove	see AR 25 (mile 59.26–66.34)			
Independence	Southside	0.000	0.000	US 167 / AR 25 north (Batesville Boulevard) – Batesville	Eastern end of AR 25 concurrency
Independence	Salado	3.74	6.02	AR 14S west – Southside	Eastern terminus of AR 14S
Independence		12.72	20.47	AR 157 south (Blackland Road)	Northern terminus of AR 157
Independence		15.41	24.80	AR 122 east – Newark	Western terminus of AR 122
Jackson		23.691	38.127	AR 367 south – Bradford, Bald Knob	Western end of AR 367 concurrency; former US 67 south
Jackson	Newport			Newport Bridge over White River	
Jackson	Newport	0.68	1.09	AR 69 north – Jacksonport, Jacksonport State Park	Southern terminus of AR 69
Jackson	Newport	1.68	2.70	AR 367 north (Malcolm Avenue)	Eastern end of AR 367 concurrency; former US 67 north
Jackson	Newport	2.34	3.77	AR 17 south	Northern terminus of AR 17; former AR 224
Jackson		4.80	7.72	I-57 / US 67 – Newport, Bald Knob, Little Rock	Exit 80 on I-57
Jackson		4.99	8.03	AR 224 west	Eastern terminus of AR 224
Jackson	Erwin	6.55	10.54	AR 17 – Newport, McCrory	
Jackson	Erwin	6.79	10.93	To AR 17 north – Newport	Access via AR 14Y
Jackson		9.61	15.47	AR 145 south – Blackville	Northern terminus of AR 145
Jackson	Amagon	13.28	21.37	AR 37 south – Algoa, Beedeville	Northern terminus of AR 37
Jackson		15.87	25.54	AR 37 north / AR 384 south – Grubbs, Balch	Southern terminus of AR 37; northern terminus of AR 384
Poinsett	Waldenburg	23.51	37.84	US 49 / US 63 – Jonesboro, Weiner, Hickory Ridge	
Poinsett	Harrisburg	35.114	56.511	AR 1 (Illinois Avenue) – Jonesboro, Wynne	
Poinsett		36.01	57.95	AR 163 north to AR 214	Southern terminus of AR 163
Poinsett		36.45	58.66	AR 163 south – Bay Village, Levesque, Lake Poinsett State Park, Lake Poinsett	Northern terminus of AR 163
Poinsett	Landers	42.11	67.77	AR 373 north to AR 214	Southern terminus of AR 373
Poinsett	Weona	43.89	70.63	AR 373 south – Stewart	Northern terminus of AR 373
Poinsett	Payneway	49.45	79.58	AR 463 north – Judd Hill	Southern terminus of AR 463
Poinsett	Payneway	49.857	80.237	I-555 – Trumann, Jonesboro, Memphis	Eastern terminus; exit 18 on I-555
Poinsett	Gap in route				
Poinsett	Lepanto	0.000	0.000	AR 140 – Osceola, Marked Tree	Western terminus
Mississippi		4.43	7.13	AR 77 – Bondsville, Denwood	
Mississippi		6.32	10.17	AR 297 south – Dyess	Northern terminus of AR 297
Mississippi		12.10	19.47	I-55 – Blytheville, Memphis	Exit 41 on I-55
Mississippi	Marie	13.41	21.58	AR 181 north	Southern terminus of AR 181
Mississippi	Marie	13.82	22.24	AR 119 north – Carson Lake	Southern terminus of AR 119
Mississippi	Wilson	17.676	28.447	US 61 (Cortez Kennedy Avenue) – Blytheville, Memphis, Wilson Business District, Hampson Archeological Museum State Park	
Mississippi	Golden Lake	19.229	30.946	CR S449	Eastern terminus
1.000 mi = 1.609 km; 1.000 km = 0.621 mi: Concurrency terminus

== Related routes ==
=== Alternate route ===
Highway 14A
- Location: Independence County
- Length: 3.68 mi (5.92 km)
- Existed: June 23, 1965–May 26, 1978

Arkansas Highway 14 Alternate is a former alternate route of 1.34 miles (2.16 km) in Independence County. Highway 14A began at Highway 14 at Salado and ran northeast to Ramsey Hill, terminating at US 167 and Highway 25. The route was added to the state highway system on June 23, 1965. Highway 14A was supplanted by mainline Highway 14 during a rerouting in 1978.

Major intersections
The entire route is in Independence County.

Location	mi	km	Destinations	Notes
Ramsey Hill	3.68	5.92	US 167 / AR 25 west – Batesville, Bald Knob, Heber Springs	Western terminus; eastern terminus of AR 25
Salado	0.00	0.00	AR 14	Eastern terminus
1.000 mi = 1.609 km; 1.000 km = 0.621 mi

=== Erwin suffixed route ===
Highway 14Y
- Length: 0.305 mi (491 m)
- Existed: 1991–present

Arkansas Highway 14Y (AR 14Y) is an unsigned connector route of 0.31 miles (0.50 km) in Jackson County.

Major intersections

The entire route is in Erwin, Jackson County.

mi	km	Destinations	Notes
0.000	0.000	AR 14 – Waldenburg	Southern terminus
0.305	0.491	AR 17 – Newport	Northern terminus
1.000 mi = 1.609 km; 1.000 km = 0.621 mi
