= Arkansas Highway 268 =

State highway in Arkansas, United States

Highway 268

Route information
- Maintained by ArDOT
- Existed: May 23, 1973–present

Section 1
- Length: 3.00 mi (4.83 km)
- West end: AR 14
- East end: CR 227 (B Rodgers Cir) / CR 259 (Locust Rd)

Section 2
- Length: 2.78 mi (4.47 km)
- West end: AR 14 near Mull
- East end: Buffalo National River

Location
- Country: United States
- State: Arkansas

Highway system
- Arkansas Highway System; Interstate; US; State; Business; Spurs; Suffixed; Scenic; Heritage
← AR 267	→ AR 269

Highway 268 (AR 268, Ark. 268, and Hwy. 268) is a designation for two state highways in Marion County. One route of 3.00 miles (4.83 km) runs from Highway 14 to Marion County Road 227 (CR 227, B Rodgers Cir) and CR 259 (Locust Rd). A second route in south Marion County runs 2.78 miles (4.47 km) from Highway 14 to the Buffalo National River. Both routes are maintained by the Arkansas State Highway and Transportation Department (AHTD).

== Route description ==
=== Western Marion County ===
The route begins at Highway 14 in northeast Marion County within the Ozark Mountains. The route serves as a short rural route near Bull Shoals Lake, running northeast to and intersection, where it meets Marion CR 227 (B Rodgers Cir) and CR 259 (Locust Rd). The roadway continues east as CR 259/Locust Rd, with CR 227 running north from the intersection.

=== Buffalo River ===
Highway 268 begins at Highway 14 in southern Marion County near the unincorporated community of Mull. The route runs east to the Buffalo National River. This access point on the river was formerly owned and operated by the Arkansas Department of Parks and Tourism as Buffalo River State Park, but was re-designated as the United States' first National River under National Park Service jurisdiction in 1972.

== History ==
The section in western Marion County was added to the state highway system on May 23, 1973, pursuant to Act 9 of 1973 by the Arkansas General Assembly. The act directed county judges and legislators to designate up to 12 miles (19 km) of county roads as state highways in each county.

== Major intersections ==
The entire route is in Marion County.

Location	mi	km	Destinations	Notes
	0.00	0.00	AR 14 – Lead Hill, Yellville	Southern terminus
	3.00	4.83	CR 227 (B Rodgers Cir) / CR 259 (Locust Rd)	Northern terminus
Gap in route
	0.00	0.00	AR 14 – Yellville, Marshall	Southern terminus
	2.78	4.47	Buffalo National River	Northern terminus
1.000 mi = 1.609 km; 1.000 km = 0.621 mi

== See also ==
- List of state highways in Arkansas
