= Newport Bridge =

Newport Bridge may refer to:

- Claiborne Pell Newport Bridge, a bridge over Narragansett Bay in Rhode Island
- Newport Bridge (Arkansas) over the White River in Newport, Arkansas
- Bridges over the River Usk in the city of Newport, South Wales:
  - Newport Town Bridge, a road bridge
  - Newport City Bridge, a road bridge
  - Newport City footbridge, a pedestrian/cycle footbridge
  - Newport Transporter Bridge, a car and pedestrian bridge
- Tees Newport Bridge in Middlesbrough, England
- Yaquina Bay Bridge in Newport, Oregon
- Saigon Bridge, formerly known as Newport Bridge, a bridge over the Saigon River, built during the Vietnam War
