= Summit, Arkansas =

- City
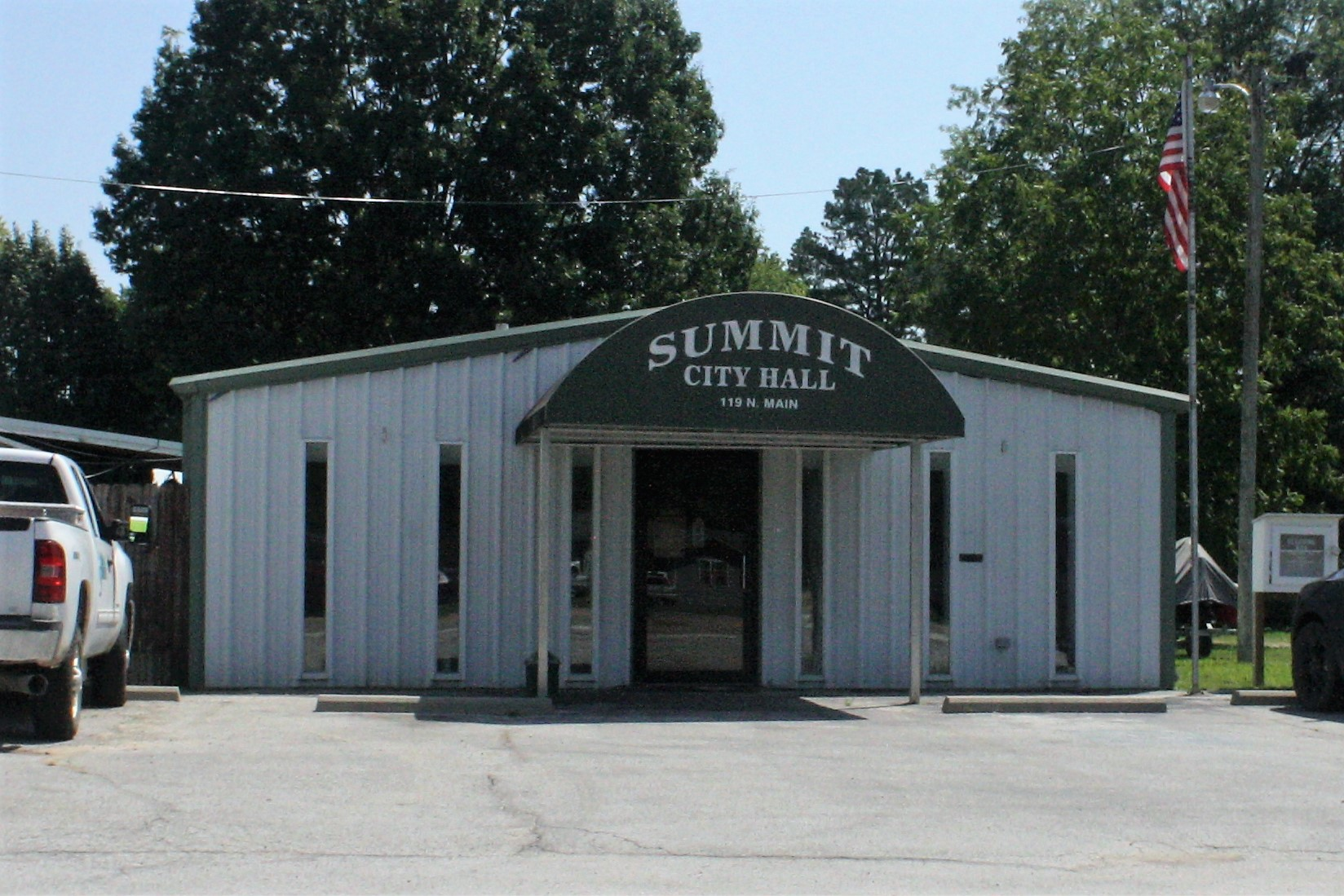
- Summit city hall

- Location in Marion County, Arkansas
- Coordinates: 36°15′08″N 92°41′18″W
- Country: United States
- State: Arkansas
- County: Marion

Area
  - Total: 1.20 sq mi (3.12 km^{2})
  - Land: 1.20 sq mi (3.12 km^{2})
  - Water: 0 sq mi (0.00 km^{2})
- Elevation: 863 ft (263 m)

Population (2020)
  - Total: 544
  - Estimate (2025): 526 ▼
  - Density: 451.1/sq mi (174.17/km^{2})
- Time zone: UTC-6 (Central (CST))
  - Summer (DST): UTC-5 (CDT)
- ZIP code: 72677
- Area code: 870
- FIPS code: 05-67940
- GNIS feature ID: 2405545

Summit is a city in Marion County, Arkansas, United States. The population was 544 at the 2020 census, down from 604 in 2010.

== Geography ==
Summit is located in central Marion County and is bordered to the south by the city of Yellville, the Marion county seat. Arkansas Highway 14 is Summit's Main Street; the highway leads south to the center of Yellville and northwest 22 miles (35 km) to Lead Hill. State Highway 202 (Park Avenue) leads southwest 1 mile (1.6 km) to U.S. Routes 412 and 62, and northeast 7 miles (11 km) to Flippin.

According to the United States Census Bureau, the city of Summit has a total area of 1.2 square miles (3.1 km^{2}), all land. The city is drained by Town Branch and its East Prong, which lead southeast to Crooked Creek, an east-flowing tributary of the White River.

== Demographics ==
Historical population
Census	Pop.	Note	%±
1930	122		—
1940	198		62.3%
1950	268		35.4%
1960	239		−10.8%
1970	321		34.3%
1980	506		57.6%
1990	480		−5.1%
2000	586		22.1%
2010	604		3.1%
2020	544		−9.9%
2025 (est.)	526	▼	−3.3%
U.S. Decennial Census

As of the census of 2000, there were 586 people, 234 households, and 156 families residing in the city. The population density was 478.2 inhabitants per square mile (184.6/km^{2}). There were 280 housing units at an average density of 228.5 per square mile (88.2/km^{2}). The racial makeup of the city was 96.42% White, 0.51% Black or African American, 1.54% Native American, 0.17% from other races, and 1.37% from two or more races. 1.54% of the population were Hispanic or Latino of any race.

There were 234 households, out of which 38.9% had children under the age of 18 living with them, 44.0% were married couples living together, 16.2% had a female householder with no husband present, and 33.3% were non-families. 30.3% of all households were made up of individuals, and 11.5% had someone living alone who was 65 years of age or older. The average household size was 2.50 and the average family size was 3.12.

In the city, the population was spread out, with 30.5% under the age of 18, 9.2% from 18 to 24, 29.0% from 25 to 44, 20.3% from 45 to 64, and 10.9% who were 65 years of age or older. The median age was 32 years. For every 100 females, there were 112.3 males. For every 100 females age 18 and over, there were 98.5 males.

The median income for a household in the city was $22,500, and the median income for a family was $27,308. Males had a median income of $20,054 versus $18,214 for females. The per capita income for the city was $10,393. About 13.5% of families and 20.2% of the population were below the poverty line, including 29.7% of those under age 18 and 8.1% of those age 65 or over.

== Education ==
Public education for early childhood, elementary and secondary school students is provided by the Yellville–Summit School District, which leads to graduation from Yellville–Summit High School.

Summit has no establishment of higher education within its city limits. The nearest community colleges are Arkansas State University–Mountain Home located approximately 21 miles east in Mountain Home and North Arkansas College located approximately 27 miles west in Harrison. The nearest four-year public university is Arkansas Tech University located approximately 98 miles southwest in Russellville.
