= Sylamore Creek Bridge =

- U.S. National Register of Historic Places
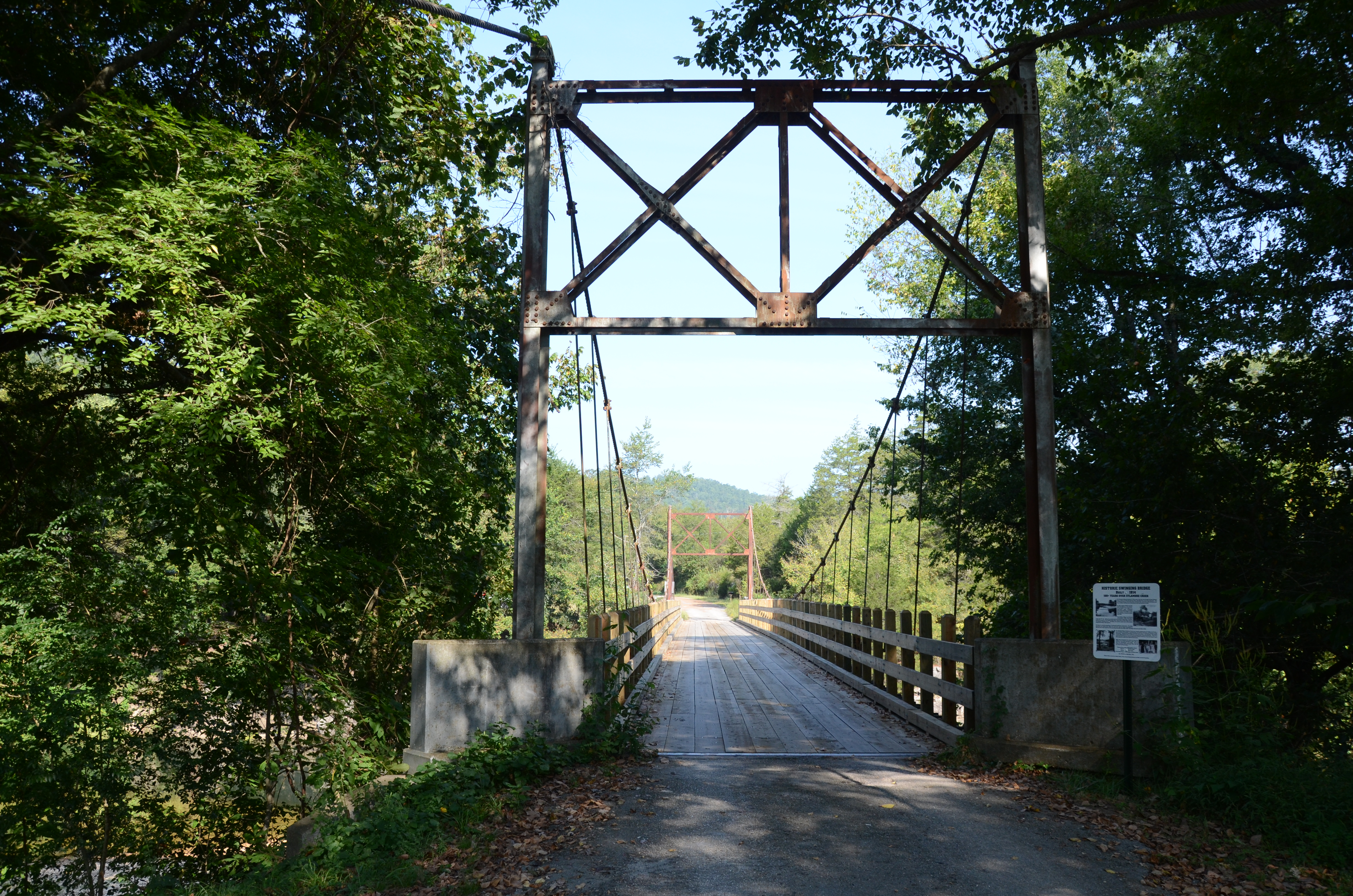

- Location within Arkansas Location within the United States
- Nearest city: Allison, Arkansas
- Coordinates: 35°56′9″N 92°7′18″W
- Area: less than one acre
- Built: 1945
- Architect: N.B. Garver
- Architectural style: Wire-Cable Suspension Bridge
- MPS: Historic Bridges of Arkansas MPS
- NRHP reference No.: 99001353
- Added to NRHP: November 18, 1999

The Sylamore Creek Bridge is a historic bridge in east central Stone County, Arkansas, just south of the Ozark-St. Francis National Forest. It carries County Road 283 across Sylamore Creek, a short way west of Arkansas Highway 9 and north of the Holiday Mountain Resort in Allison. It is a wire-cable suspension bridge, with steel towers mounted on concrete piers supporting four main cables that are anchored into concrete abutments. The bridge is 202 feet (62 m) long, with a deck width of 19 feet 6 inches (5.94 m) and a clearance height of 11 feet (3.4 m). Built in 1945, it is one of three known wire-cable bridges in the state.

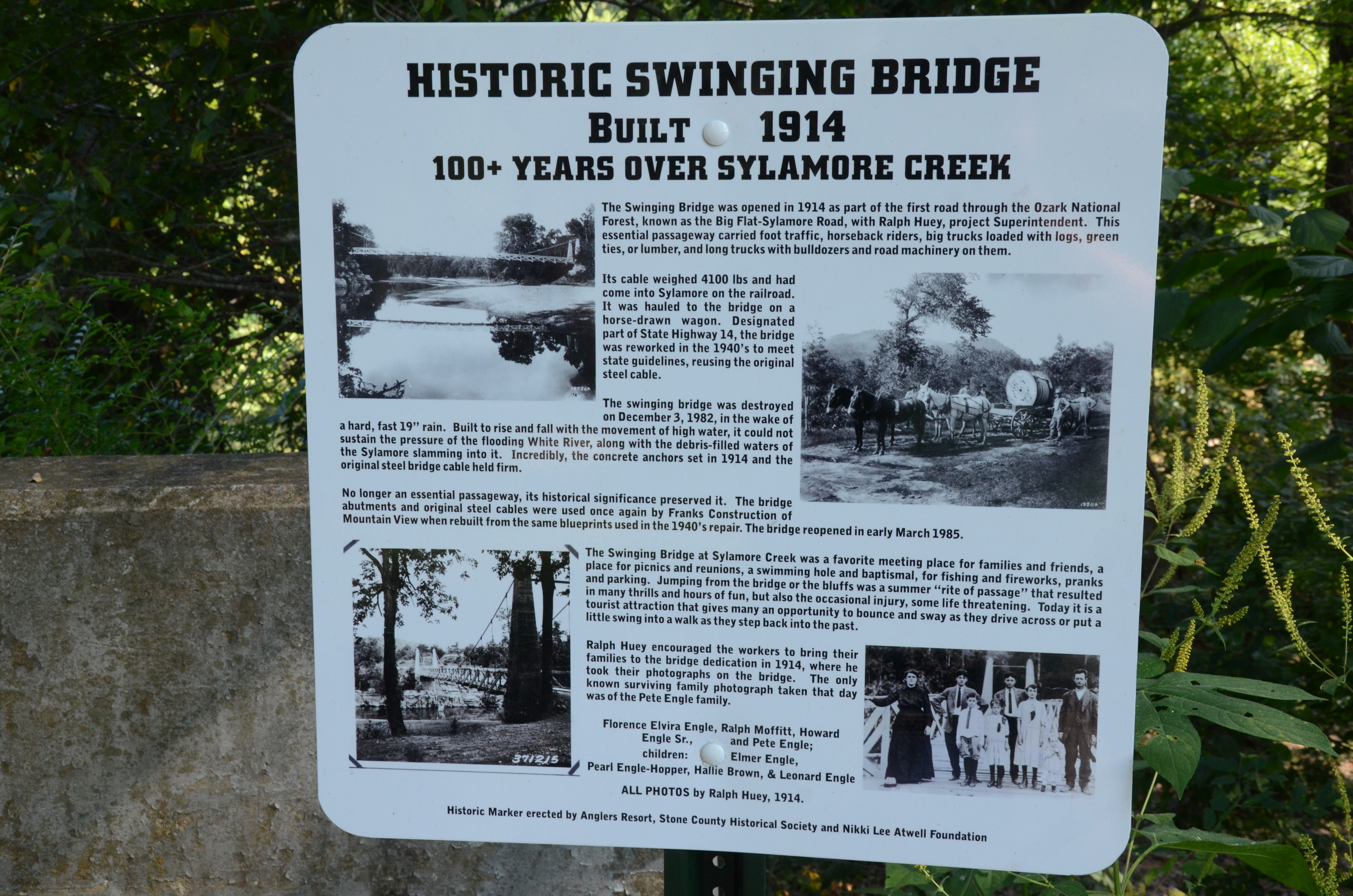
Sign describing the bridge's history.

The bridge was listed on the National Register of Historic Places in 1999.

== See also ==
- National Register of Historic Places listings in Stone County, Arkansas
- List of bridges on the National Register of Historic Places in Arkansas
