= Binks Hess House and Barn =

Historic house in Arkansas, United States

- U.S. National Register of Historic Places
- Location within Arkansas Location within the United States
- Location: Off AR 14, Marcella, Arkansas
- Coordinates: 35°47′20″N 91°52′53″W
- Area: less than one acre
- Built: 1871
- Architect: Burrough Bros.
- Architectural style: Greek Revival, Traverse Crib plan
- MPS: Stone County MRA
- NRHP reference No.: 85002227
- Added to NRHP: September 17, 1985

The Binks Hess House and Barn are a historic farm property in Marcella, Arkansas. Located just east of Arkansas Highway 14 on Partee Drive, it is a 1 1/2-story dogtrot house, with a side gable roof, weatherboard siding, and a stone pier foundation. A single-story porch, supported by square posts, stands in front of the open breezeway section, which is finished in flushboarding, at the center of the east-facing main facade. An ell extends to the rear. Behind the house stands the barn, built on a transverse crib plan with side shed-roof additions. Both house and barn were built about 1871 for Binks Hess, brother of Marcella's founder Thomas. The barn is believed to be the oldest in Stone County, and the first to use sawn lumber in its construction.

The property was listed on the National Register of Historic Places in 1985.

== See also ==
- National Register of Historic Places listings in Stone County, Arkansas
