= Henry V. Young =

American lawyer and politician

Henry V. Young (August 19, 1903-?) was a lawyer and politician in Arkansas. He served in the Arkansas House of Representatives in 1939, 1941, 1943, and 1945. He was a Democrat. He represented Marion County, Arkansas.

Young was born in Yellville. He attended the public schools in Yellville, Arkansas State College, Northeastern Oklahoma Teachers College and Cumberland University School of Law. He married and had three children. He was a Methodist and a Mason.

He 1941 he gave testimony about the potential for more mining in the area he lived. He stated, "The people of my country are poor people. They have to depend for a living on cedar posts, railroad ties, and stave bolts and that timber is now pretty well depleted- it is about all gone and if we can't get something in there I am afraid that all activities will have to stop. If we don't have something else to take the place of timber and other resources that are now gone, we are going to be in the same shape that grandma was in when grandpa got his monkey glands."
