= Walter Gray House =

Historic house in Arkansas, United States

- U.S. National Register of Historic Places
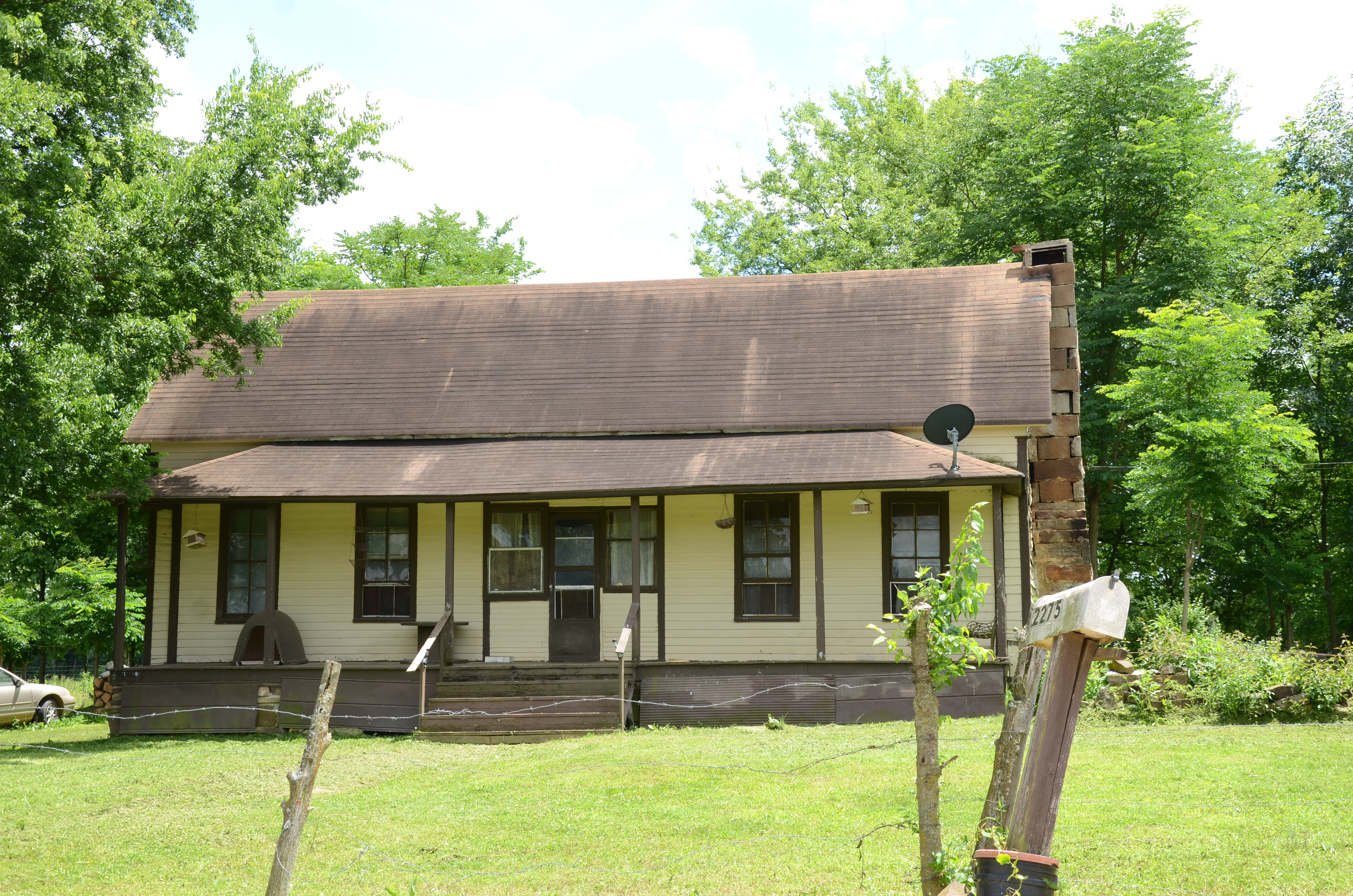

- Location within Arkansas Location within the United States
- Location: Off AR 14, Melrose, Arkansas
- Coordinates: 35°44′20″N 91°51′4″W
- Area: less than one acre
- Built: 1910
- Architectural style: Dogtrot
- MPS: Stone County MRA
- NRHP reference No.: 85002212
- Added to NRHP: September 17, 1985

The Walter Gray House is a historic house in rural southeastern Stone County, Arkansas. It is located on the Melrose Loop, about 0.5 miles (0.80 km) south of Arkansas Highway 14 between Locust Grove and Marcella. It is a single-story dogtrot house with an addition to its rear. It is a wood-frame structure with weatherboard siding, with a hip-roof porch extending across its front facade, supported by chamfered posts. At its west end is a chimney built out of square pieces of sawn stone, laid to present a veneer-like facade. An L-shaped porch wraps around the rear addition. The house was built in 1910 by Walter Gray, a local farmer, and represents the continued use of this traditional form of architecture into the 20th century.

The house was listed on the National Register of Historic Places in 1985.

== See also ==
- National Register of Historic Places listings in Stone County, Arkansas
