= John Bettis House =

Historic house in Arkansas, United States

- U.S. National Register of Historic Places
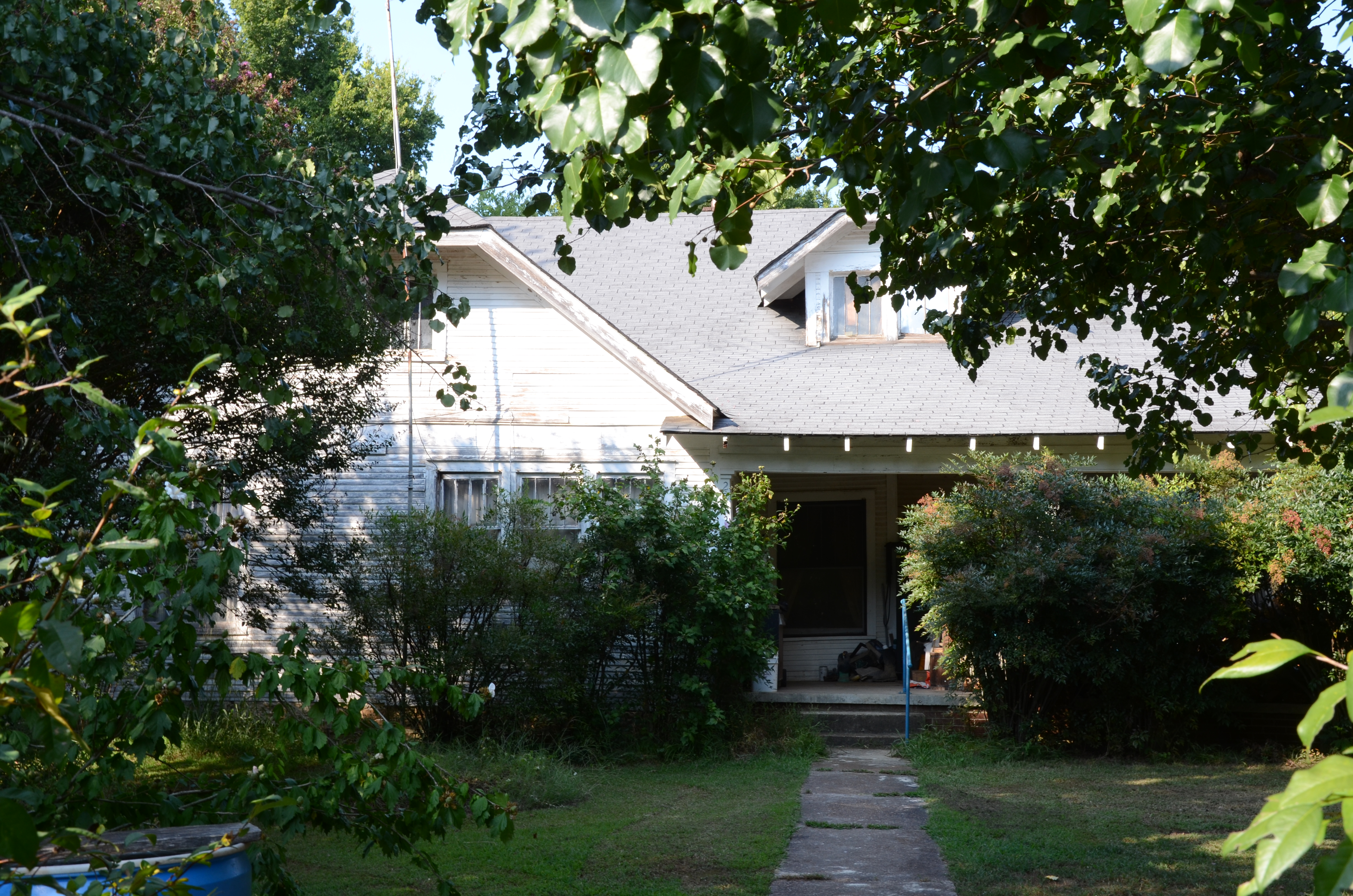

- Location within Arkansas Location within the United States
- Location: AR 14, Pleasant Grove, Stone County, Arkansas
- Coordinates: 35°48′53″N 91°54′18″W
- Area: less than one acre
- Built: c. 1929
- Architectural style: Bungalow/Craftsman
- MPS: Stone County MRA
- NRHP reference No.: 85002220
- Added to NRHP: September 17, 1985

The John Bettis House is a historic house on the north side of Arkansas Highway 14 in Pleasant Grove, Arkansas, a short way south of its junction with Stone County Road 32.

== Description and history ==
It is a 1 1/2-story wood-framed structure with American Craftsman styling. It is L-shaped in plan, with a broad clipped gable roof that has exposed rafter ends in the eaves. The porch, set in the crook of the L, is recessed under the roof, and is supported by battered columns on brick piers. A clipped-gable dormer projects from the roof above the porch. The house was built about 1929, and is the first farmhouse in the county documented to depart from vernacular architectural styles in which they were previously built.

The house was listed on the National Register of Historic Places on September 17, 1985.

== See also ==
- National Register of Historic Places listings in Stone County, Arkansas
