= Kelley Linck =

American politician

Kelley J. Linck

Member of the Arkansas House of Representatives from the 86th district
- In office 2011–2013
- Preceded by: Monty Davenport
- Succeeded by: Greg Leding

Member of the Arkansas House of Representatives from the 99th district
- In office 2013 – June 3, 2016
- Preceded by: Tim Summers
- Succeeded by: Jack Fortner

Personal details
- Born: November 10, 1963 (age 62) Flippin, Arkansas, USA
- Party: Republican
- Parent(s): Ike and Velma Linck
- Education: Yellville–Summit High School; Arkansas Tech University
- Occupation: Lobbyist

Kelley J. Linck (born November 10, 1963) is a partner, lobbyist and consultant with 501 Strategies, LLC in Little Rock, Arkansas.

He was formerly with Mullenix and Associates, LLC in Little Rock and previously served as the chief of legislative and governmental affairs for the Arkansas Department of Human Services in the capital city of Little Rock, Arkansas. Before this, Linck was a tourism official in Yellville in Marion County in northern Arkansas and a Republican former member of the Arkansas House of Representatives. He represented District 99, encompassing parts of Marion, Searcy, Boone, and Baxter counties, from 2013 to June 3, 2016. Linck previously represented District 86, held by Democrat Greg Leding of Fayetteville, from 2011 to 2013.

== Political life ==
Linck resigned from the Arkansas House of Representatives on June 3, 2016, to join the Arkansas Department of Health and Human Services.

In September 2019, Linck announced that he would be stepping down from his post at Arkansas Department of Health and Human Services effective October 4, 2019 to allow him to take a position with Little Rock lobbying firm Mullenix & Associates. Mullenix & Associates are based in Little Rock and assist corporate clients (e.g. Blue Cross & Blue Shield) who serve Medicaid recipients in Arkansas. It was not immediately clear whether Linck's new position with the lobbying firm Mullenix & Associates would represent a conflict of interest in view of his previous position with the state's Department of Human Services. Chief Counsel David Sterling suggested that Linck should avoid all involvement with cases involving clients of Mullenix & Associates during his remaining tenure with the state (through October 4, 2019).

Further, 2015 Arkansas Code § 19-11-709 places restrictions on the employment of former employees and has been cited in this case as well as another concurrent case of another Arkansas DHS official who is leaving for private sector employment. § 19-11-709 prohibits a state employee from acting "as a principal or as an agent for anyone other than the state" in connection with any matter in which the employee participates "personally and substantially." The law also prohibits former employees and partners of former employees from being involved as a "principal or agent for anyone other than the state" regarding any state contract in which that employee provided "decision, approval, disapproval, recommendation, rendering of advice, investigation, or otherwise while an employee." The law also bars former state employees for one year from acting for a private company in connection with contracts that were within the person's "official responsibility" while employed by the state. It is unclear whether

Linck was quoted as promising to "have that discussion" with his new employers once he begins his tenure with them. Legislators in Arkansas face a two-year cooling off period before becoming lobbyists. Linck left his previous position as a Legislator in June 2016 to work for the Department of Human Services until October 2019, when he became a lobbyist.

On April 18, 2022, WSG Consulting, LLC announced Linck had joined the firm as a partner. WSG was founded by former Speaker of the House Robbie Wills and also includes former Speaker Bill Stovall, Dana Wills, C.P.A. and former legislator Rick Green. Linck and Stovall more recently acquired the shares of WSG Consulting and renamed their own organization 501 Strategies, LLC

Preceded by Monty Davenport	Arkansas State Representative for District 86 (now Washington County); 2011–2013	Succeeded by Greg Leding
Preceded by Tim Summers	Arkansas State Representative for District 99 (Marion, Searcy, Boone, and Baxter counties); 2013–June 3, 2016	Succeeded by Jack Fortner
