= Melrose, Arkansas =

- Unincorporated community
- Location within Arkansas Location within the United States
- Coordinates: 35°44′37″N 91°50′58″W
- Country: United States
- State: Arkansas
- County: Stone
- Elevation: 308 ft (94 m)
- Time zone: UTC-6 (Central (CST))
  - Summer (DST): UTC-5 (CDT)
- Area code: 870
- GNIS feature ID: 58162

Melrose is an unincorporated community in Stone County, Arkansas, United States. Melrose is located on Arkansas Highway 14, 11.9 miles (19.2 km) west of Batesville. The Walter Gray House, which is listed on the National Register of Historic Places, is located in Melrose.
