= Yellville–Summit School District =

School district in Arkansas

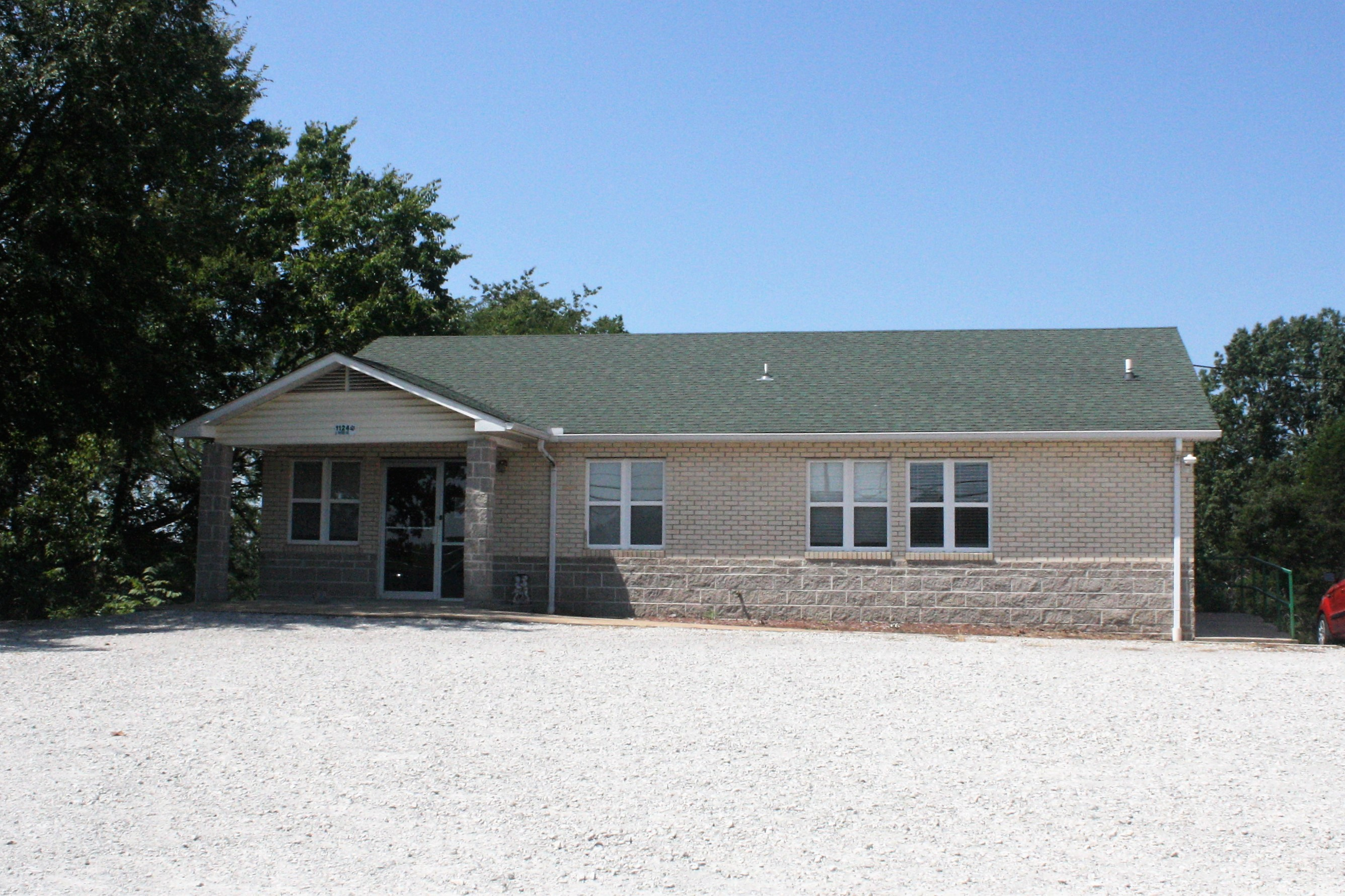

Location
- 1124 Panther Ave; Yellville, Arkansas 72687 United States

District information
- Mottoes: Believe. Achieve. Succeed.; Together we can.
- Grades: K-12
- Accreditation: Arkansas Department of Education
- Schools: 3
- NCES District ID: 0514490

Students and staff
- Students: 1,041
- Teachers: 128.44 (on FTE basis)
- Student–teacher ratio: 8.10
- District mascot: Panthers
- Colors: Green; White

Other information
- Website: www.yellvillesummitschools.com

Yellville–Summit School District is an accredited school district located in Yellville, Arkansas, United States. Yellville–Summit School District provides early childhood, elementary, and secondary education to students in Yellville, Summit, and surrounding unincorporated communities of rural Marion County, Arkansas. It was created when the former Yellville and Summit school districts consolidated to form the Yellville–Summit School District.

== Schools ==
The school district, high school, middle school, and elementary school are accredited by the Arkansas Department of Education (ADE). In 2012, the high school was nationally recognized as a bronze medalist in the Best High Schools report by U.S. News & World Report. The Yellville–Summit School District mascot and athletic emblem is the panther with green and white serving as the school colors.

- Yellville–Summit High School – provides secondary education in grades 9 through 12.
- Yellville–Summit Middle School – provides education in grades 5 through 8.
- Yellville–Summit Elementary School – provides early childhood and elementary education in prekindergarten through grades 4.
