= Allison, Arkansas =

- Unincorporated community
- Location within Arkansas Location within the United States
- Coordinates: 35°56′12″N 92°07′03″W
- Country: United States
- State: Arkansas
- County: Stone
- Elevation: 394 ft (120 m)
- Time zone: UTC-6 (Central (CST))
  - Summer (DST): UTC-5 (CDT)
- Area code: 870
- GNIS feature ID: 70432

Allison is an unincorporated community in Stone County, Arkansas, United States. Allison is located along the White River at the junction of Arkansas highways 5, 9 and 14, 4.7 miles (7.6 km) north of Mountain View. The Sylamore Creek Bridge, which is listed on the National Register of Historic Places, is located in Allison.
