= Crooked Creek (Arkansas) =

Stream in Arkansas, U.S.

Coordinates: 36°13′38″N 92°28′37″W

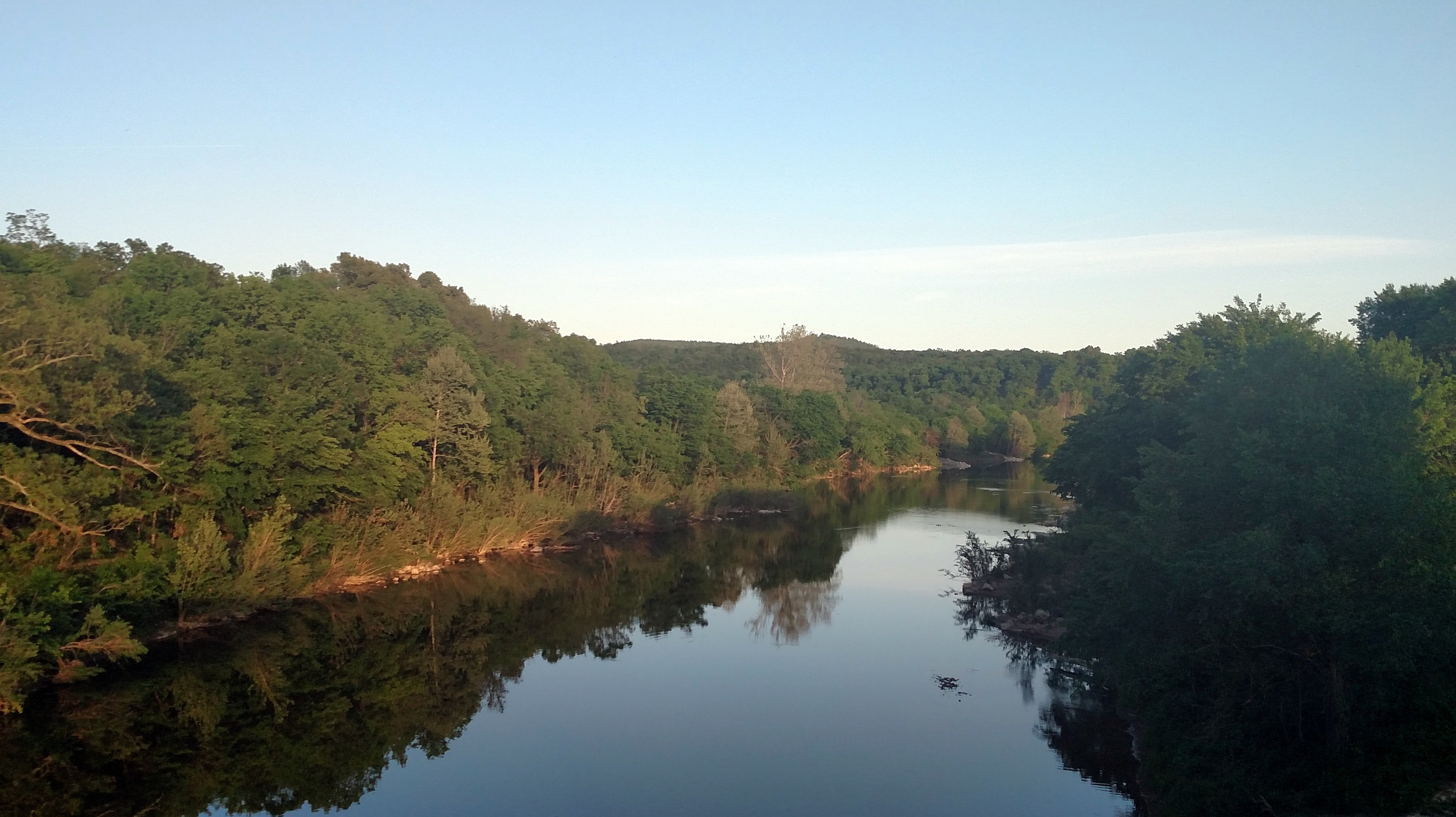
Crooked Creek in Yellville

Crooked Creek is a stream in Newton, Boone and Marion counties of north Arkansas in the United States. It is a tributary of the White River.

The stream confluence with the White River is in Marion County at: and the stream headwaters in Newton County are at: .

The stream headwaters arise just to the east of Sulphur Spring on the north flank of Sulphur Mountain in northern Newton County. The stream flows north into Boone County passing under Arkansas Highway 206 just west of Elmwood. It continues north parallel to Arkansas Highway 7 passing through the southeast part of Harrison and under U.S. Route 65. The stream turns east and begins a long series of meanders earning its name. It enters Marion County and turns southeast passing Pyatt and under U.S. Route 62. It flows east roughly paralleling Route 62 and crossing under Arkansas Highway 14 south of Yellville. It continues eastward until entering the White River just south of Buford Station and approximately four miles southeast of Yellville.

Crooked Creek has a mean discharge of 486 cubic feet per second at Yellville.
