= Yellville–Summit High School =

Location
- 1124 North Panther Avenue; Yellville, Arkansas 72687; United States; 36°14′21″N 92°41′24″W

Information
- Motto: Together we can.
- School district: Yellville–Summit School District
- Superintendent: Wes Henderson
- CEEB code: 042725
- Principal: Clark Gustin
- Teaching staff: 69.29 (FTE)
- Enrollment: 337 (2023–2024)
- Student to teacher ratio: 4.86
- Colors: Green and white
- Team name: Panthers
- Website: www.yellvillesummitschools.com/o/yss/page/high-school

Yellville–Summit High School is an accredited public high school located in Yellville, Arkansas, United States. Yellville–Summit High School provides secondary education to students in Yellville, Summit and surrounding unincorporated communities of rural Marion County, Arkansas. It was created when the former Yellville and Summit school districts consolidated and is the only high school of the newly formed Yellville–Summit School District.

== Academics ==
The assumed course of study follows the Smart Core curriculum developed by the Arkansas Department of Education (ADE). Students complete regular and career focus courses and exams and may select Advanced Placement (AP) coursework and exams, which may lead to college credit. The high school is accredited by the ADE and has been accredited by AdvancED since 1997.

== Athletics ==
The Yellville–Summit High School mascot and athletic emblem is the panther with green and white serving as the school colors.

For 2012–14, the Yellville–Summit Panthers compete in the 3A Classification within the 3A Region 1 (Football) and 3A Region 1 East (Basketball) conferences, as administered by the Arkansas Activities Association. The Panthers participate in interscholastic sports and activities including: football, volleyball, golf (boys/girls), basketball (boys/girls), baseball, fastpitch softball, and track and field (boys/girls).

== Notable alumni ==
- Kelley Linck (c. 1981), Republican member of the Arkansas House of Representatives from Yellville since 2011
