= Miles Jeffery Barn =

- U.S. National Register of Historic Places
- Location within Arkansas Location within the United States
- Nearest city: Optimus, Arkansas
- Coordinates: 35°59′11″N 92°7′21″W
- Area: less than one acre
- Built: 1858
- Architectural style: Triple Crib plan
- MPS: Stone County MRA
- NRHP reference No.: 85002215
- Added to NRHP: September 17, 1985

The Miles Jeffery Barn is a historic barn in rural northeastern Stone County, Arkansas. It is located off Arkansas Highway 5 south of Optimus, on a private inholding in the Ozark-St. Francis National Forest. It is a roughly rectangular three-crib structure, oriented with its ridge running roughly northeast to southwest, and set on dry laid stacks of stone. The oldest crib, at the northeast end, is estimated to date to 1858, while the other two were added later. Unlike other portions of the associated farmstead, the barn has been relatively little altered since the last crib addition.

The barn was listed on the National Register of Historic Places in 1985.

== See also ==
- National Register of Historic Places listings in Stone County, Arkansas
