= Optimus, Arkansas =

- Unincorporated community
- Location within Arkansas Location within the United States
- Coordinates: 36°02′41″N 92°07′31″W
- Country: United States
- State: Arkansas
- County: Stone
- Elevation: 676 ft (206 m)
- Time zone: UTC-6 (Central (CST))
  - Summer (DST): UTC-5 (CDT)
- Area code: 870
- GNIS feature ID: 72957

Optimus is an unincorporated community in Stone County, Arkansas, United States. Optimus is located on Arkansas Highway 5, 5.2 miles (8.4 km) south of Calico Rock. The Miles Jeffery Barn, which is listed on the National Register of Historic Places, is located in Optimus.
