= Mirror Lake Historic District =

Historic district in Arkansas, United States

- U.S. National Register of Historic Places
- U.S. Historic district
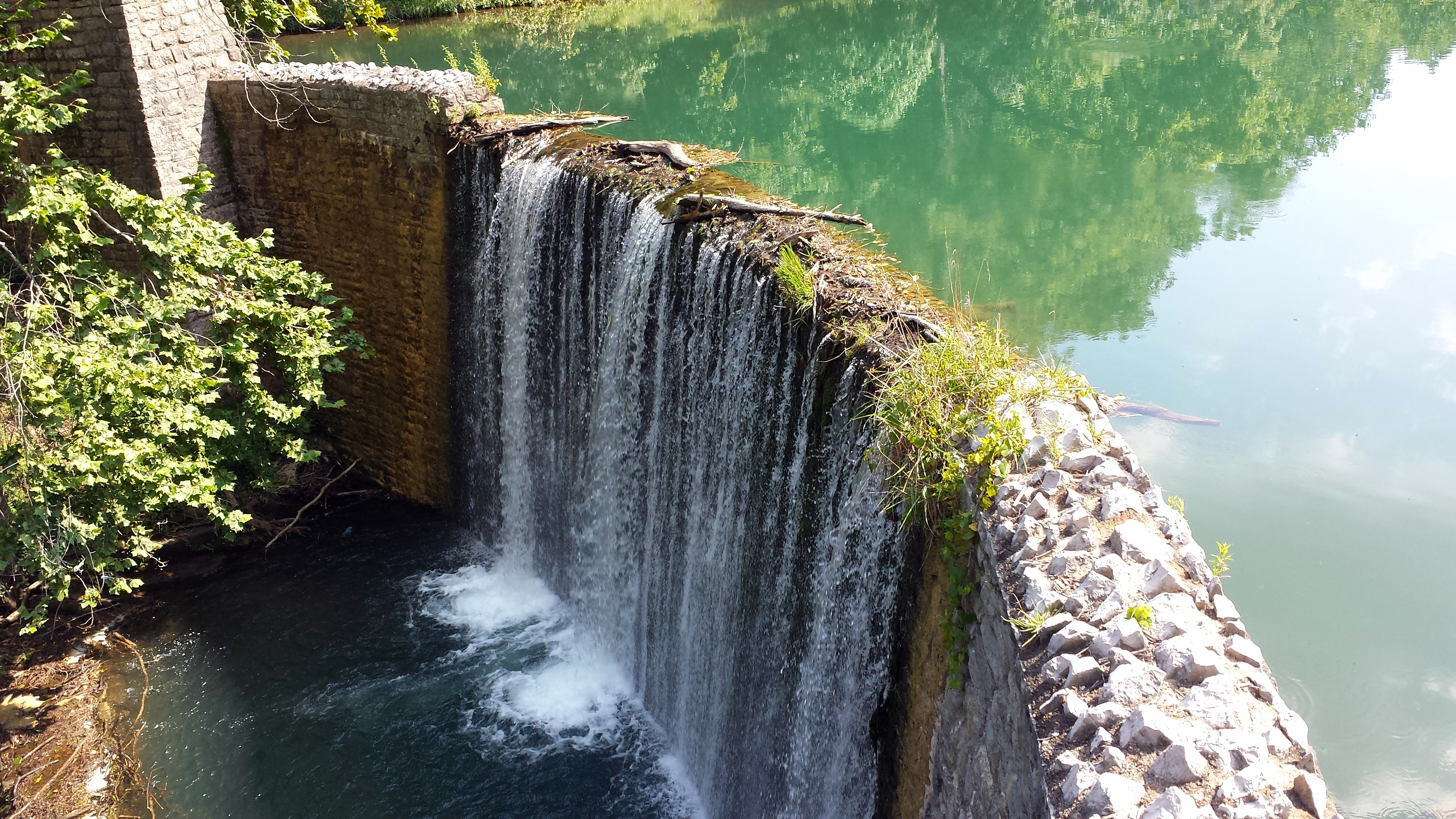

- Location within Arkansas Location within the United States
- Nearest city: Fiftysix, Arkansas
- Coordinates: 35°57′37″N 92°10′26″W
- Area: 38 acres (15 ha)
- Built: 1940
- Built by: Civilian Conservation Corps
- Architectural style: Rustic
- MPS: Facilities Constructed by the CCC in Arkansas MPS
- NRHP reference No.: 94001614
- Added to NRHP: September 11, 1995

The Mirror Lake Historic District encompasses Mirror Lake, a man-made lake in the Ozark-St. Francis National Forest near Fifty-Six, Arkansas. The lake was created by a crew of the Civilian Conservation Corps in 1940 by damming the creek emanating from Blanchard Spring. The district includes the lake, the dam, and two bridges, one of which was also built by the CCC, and a CCC-built observation shelter nearby. The area is now part of the Blanchard Springs Recreation Area.

The district was listed on the National Register of Historic Places in 1995.

== See also ==
- National Register of Historic Places listings in Stone County, Arkansas
