= Newport Bridge (Arkansas) =

- U.S. National Register of Historic Places
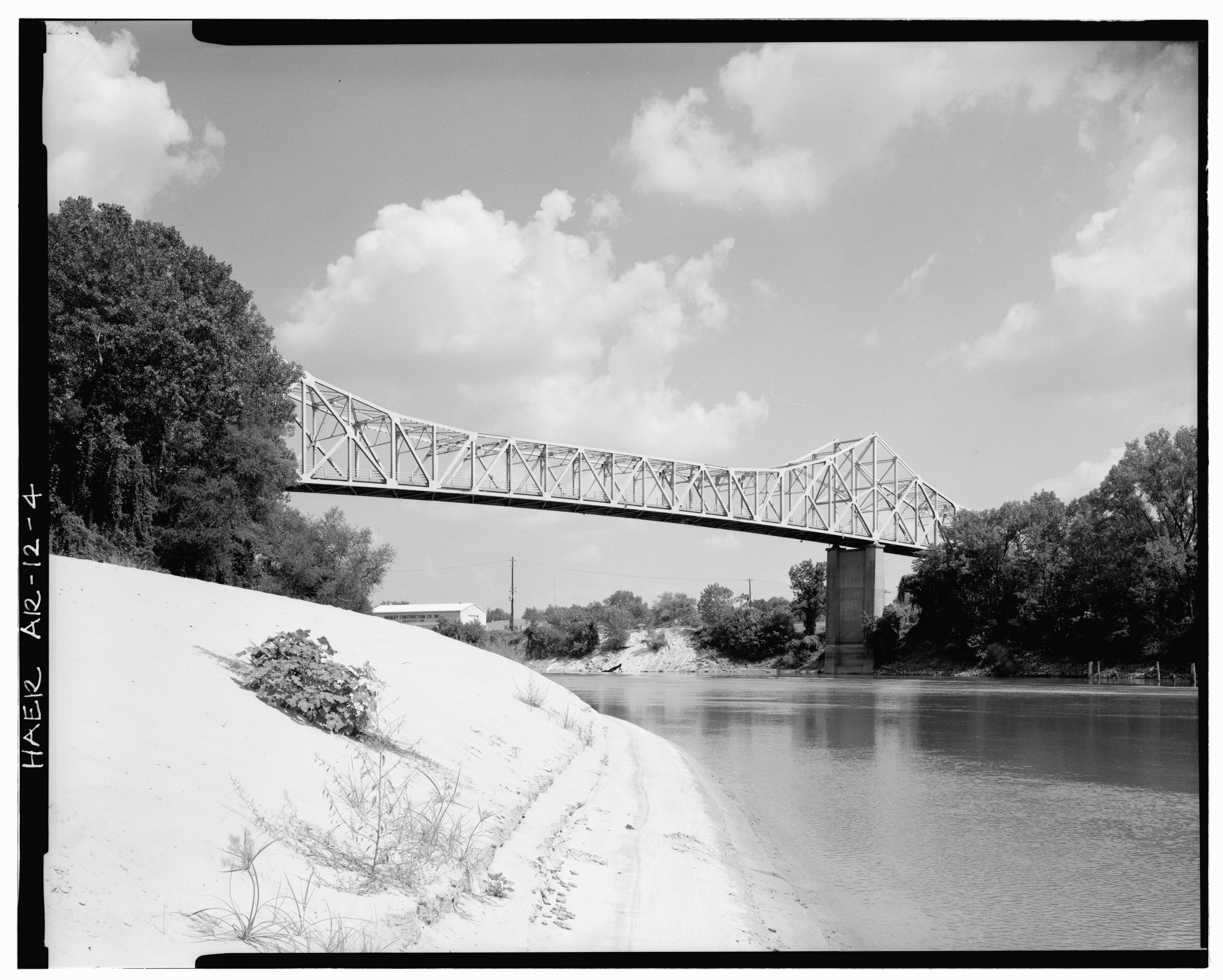
- HAER photo, 1988

- Location within Arkansas Location within the United States
- Location: AR 367, over the White River, Newport, Arkansas
- Coordinates: 35°36′33″N 91°17′21″W
- Area: less than one acre
- Built: 1930
- Architect: Ira G. Hedrick, et al.
- Architectural style: Warren cantilever
- MPS: Historic Bridges of Arkansas MPS
- NRHP reference No.: 90000503
- Added to NRHP: April 9, 1990

The Newport Bridge is a historic cantilevered Warren truss bridge over the White River in Newport, Arkansas. Built in 1930 to carry U.S. Route 67 (US 67), the road it carries is now designated Arkansas Highway 367 (AR 367) after the former highway was relocated. The main bridge is 400 feet (120 m) long, with approaches from the west of 1,278 feet (390 m) and the south of 911 feet (278 m). It has cantilevered arms 138 feet (42 m) long supported by concrete piers, with a suspended Warren truss span of 125 feet (38 m). Designed by Ira G. Hedrick, it is one of three such bridges in the state.

The bridge was listed on the National Register of Historic Places in 1990.

This bridge has since been bypassed, and is scheduled for demolition.

== See also ==
- Highway 79 Bridge, similar structure over the White River in Clarendon, Arkansas (demolished 2019)
- List of bridges documented by the Historic American Engineering Record in Arkansas
- List of bridges on the National Register of Historic Places in Arkansas
- National Register of Historic Places listings in Jackson County, Arkansas
