= Yellville, Arkansas =

- City
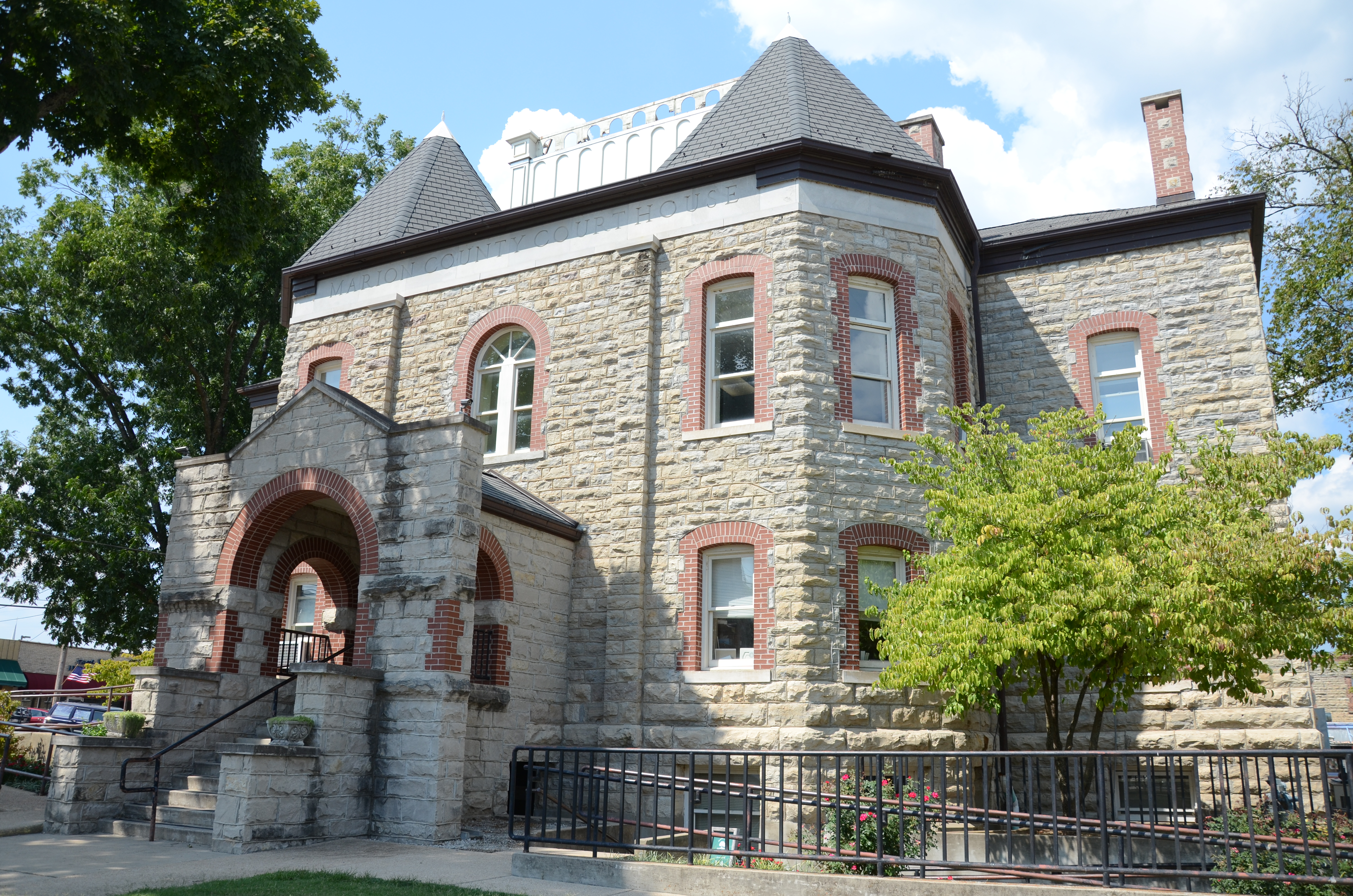
- Marion County Courthouse in downtown Yellville

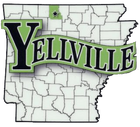
- Seal

- Location in Marion County, Arkansas
- Coordinates: 36°13′44″N 92°41′10″W
- Country: United States
- State: Arkansas
- County: Marion
- Established: 1872

Government
  - Type: Mayor–council
  - Mayor: Hunter Duren

Area
  - Total: 2.51 sq mi (6.49 km^{2})
  - Land: 2.48 sq mi (6.43 km^{2})
  - Water: 0.023 sq mi (0.06 km^{2})
- Elevation: 627 ft (191 m)

Population (2020)
  - Total: 1,178
  - Estimate (2025): 1,095 ▼
  - Density: 474.6/sq mi (183.25/km^{2})
- Time zone: UTC-6 (Central (CST))
  - Summer (DST): UTC-5 (CDT)
- ZIP code: 72687
- Area code: 870
- FIPS code: 05-77330
- GNIS feature ID: 2405799
- Website: www.yellvilleweb.com

Yellville is a city in and the county seat of Marion County, Arkansas, United States. Yellville is located in the Ozark Mountains along the banks of Crooked Creek, and neighbors the small town of Summit to the north. The population was 1,178 at the 2020 census. The town's original name is preserved in the Shawnee Town Branch, a local creek. The town holds an annual Turkey Trot Festival (turkey trot). The area's history includes mining and timber industries.

== History ==
Well before Arkansas became a state, the community was known as "Shawneetown". Yellville is named after Archibald Yell, who was the first member of the United States House of Representatives from Arkansas and the second governor of Arkansas. He was killed at the Battle of Buena Vista during the Mexican–American War.

Marion County was formed in 1836, shortly after statehood. Shawneetown was then renamed Yellville. An old tale claims Archibald Yell offered $50 to do so, but never paid the money. True or not, Governor Yell's descendants heard the story and paid the overdue "bill" several years ago. Yell's name can be seen elsewhere in the state, including Yell County and Archibald Yell Boulevard in Fayetteville. Several biographies of him have been written, the most recent published by the University of Arkansas Press in Fayetteville.

During the late 1840s, Yellville was the scene of several prolonged gunfights during the Tutt–Everett War. John A. Schnabel organized his Confederate cavalry battalion in the town in 1863.

In the early morning of July 17, 2024; Marion County received just under a foot of rainfall in a considerable flash flooding event. During the event, bridges and homes were reportedly washed out in Yellville, including a nursing home due to the high waters. The National Weather Service in Little Rock promptly issued a Flash Flood Emergency for Yellville and surrounding areas. Yellville is still recovering from the flooding impacts.

== Geography ==
Yellville is located in central Marion County. According to the United States Census Bureau, the city has a total area of 2.5 square miles (6.5 km^{2}), of which 0.02 square miles (0.05 km^{2}), or 0.96%, are water. It is bordered to the north by the small city of Summit. Mountain Home is 20 miles (32 km) to the northeast and Harrison is 28 miles (45 km) to the west via U.S. Routes 412/62.

=== Climate ===
Yellville, located in the Arkansas Ozarks, has a humid continental-subtropical climate, with cold-to-mild winters and hot, humid summers. Yellville's record high temperature of 110 °F (43 °C) was observed on August 29, 1984, and July 30, 1986, while the record low of −20 °F (−29 °C) was observed on January 11, 1977.

Climate data for Yellville, Arkansas
| Month | Jan | Feb | Mar | Apr | May | Jun | Jul | Aug | Sep | Oct | Nov | Dec | Year |
|---|---|---|---|---|---|---|---|---|---|---|---|---|---|
| Record high °F (°C) | 76 (24) | 83 (28) | 92 (33) | 95 (35) | 94 (34) | 102 (39) | 110 (43) | 110 (43) | 102 (39) | 95 (35) | 85 (29) | 78 (26) | 110 (43) |
| Mean daily maximum °F (°C) | 48 (9) | 53 (12) | 63 (17) | 73 (23) | 80 (27) | 87 (31) | 92 (33) | 91 (33) | 83 (28) | 74 (23) | 62 (17) | 51 (11) | 71 (22) |
| Mean daily minimum °F (°C) | 21 (−6) | 26 (−3) | 35 (2) | 44 (7) | 52 (11) | 61 (16) | 65 (18) | 63 (17) | 56 (13) | 43 (6) | 35 (2) | 26 (−3) | 44 (7) |
| Record low °F (°C) | −20 (−29) | −14 (−26) | 2 (−17) | 18 (−8) | 30 (−1) | 40 (4) | 44 (7) | 38 (3) | 29 (−2) | 18 (−8) | 2 (−17) | −15 (−26) | −20 (−29) |
| Average precipitation inches (mm) | 2.40 (61) | 2.90 (74) | 4.40 (112) | 4.20 (107) | 5.20 (132) | 4.10 (104) | 2.80 (71) | 3.50 (89) | 3.90 (99) | 3.70 (94) | 4.50 (114) | 3.90 (99) | 45.50 (1,156) |
| Average snowfall inches (cm) | 3.8 (9.7) | 3.4 (8.6) | 2.2 (5.6) | 0.2 (0.51) | 0 (0) | 0 (0) | 0 (0) | 0 (0) | 0 (0) | 0 (0) | 0.9 (2.3) | 2.8 (7.1) | 13.3 (34) |

== Demographics ==
Historical population
| Census | Pop. | Note | %± |
|---|---|---|---|
| 1860 | 170 | | — |
| 1870 | 96 | | −43.5% |
| 1880 | 345 | | 259.4% |
| 1890 | 263 | | −23.8% |
| 1900 | 578 | | 119.8% |
| 1910 | 463 | | −19.9% |
| 1920 | 615 | | 32.8% |
| 1930 | 478 | | −22.3% |
| 1940 | 546 | | 14.2% |
| 1950 | 697 | | 27.7% |
| 1960 | 636 | | −8.8% |
| 1970 | 860 | | 35.2% |
| 1980 | 1,044 | | 21.4% |
| 1990 | 1,181 | | 13.1% |
| 2000 | 1,312 | | 11.1% |
| 2010 | 1,204 | | −8.2% |
| 2020 | 1,178 | | −2.2% |
| 2025 (est.) | 1,095 | ▼ | −7.0% |
U.S. Decennial Census

=== 2020 census ===
As of the 2020 census, Yellville had a population of 1,178 and 271 families.

The median age was 41.8 years. 23.0% of residents were under the age of 18 and 21.1% were 65 years of age or older. For every 100 females, there were 83.8 males, and for every 100 females age 18 and over, there were 84.3 males.

0.0% of residents lived in urban areas, while 100.0% lived in rural areas.

There were 455 households, of which 28.6% had children under the age of 18 living in them. Of all households, 36.9% were married-couple households, 18.9% were households with a male householder and no spouse or partner present, and 36.7% were households with a female householder and no spouse or partner present. About 35.6% of all households were made up of individuals, and 17.2% had someone living alone who was 65 years of age or older.

There were 540 housing units, of which 15.7% were vacant. The homeowner vacancy rate was 2.8% and the rental vacancy rate was 7.8%.

Yellville racial composition
| Race | Number | Percentage |
|---|---|---|
| White (non-Hispanic) | 1,059 | 89.9% |
| Native American | 13 | 1.1% |
| Asian | 6 | 0.51% |
| Other/Mixed | 67 | 5.69% |
| Hispanic or Latino | 33 | 2.8% |

=== 2000 census ===
As of the census of 2000, there were 1,312 people, 535 households, and 356 families residing in the city. The population density was 515.6 inhabitants per square mile (199.1/km^{2}). There were 599 housing units at an average density of 235.4 per square mile (90.9/km^{2}). The racial makeup of the city was 97.71% White, 0.76% Native American, 0.23% Asian, 0.08% Pacific Islander, and 1.22% from two or more races. 0.53% of the population were Hispanic or Latino of any race.

There were 535 households, out of which 30.7% had children under the age of 18 living with them, 48.8% were married couples living together, 15.0% had a female householder with no husband present, and 33.3% were non-families. 30.3% of all households were made up of individuals, and 18.3% had someone living alone who was 65 years of age or older. The average household size was 2.31 and the average family size was 2.84.

In the city, the population was spread out, with 24.2% under the age of 18, 9.0% from 18 to 24, 22.3% from 25 to 44, 22.3% from 45 to 64, and 22.3% who were 65 years of age or older. The median age was 41 years. For every 100 females, there were 83.8 males. For every 100 females age 18 and over, there were 79.6 males.

The median income for a household in the city was $26,250, and the median income for a family was $31,793. Males had a median income of $26,000 versus $18,056 for females. The per capita income for the city was $12,618. About 13.2% of families and 17.7% of the population were below the poverty line, including 22.2% of those under age 18 and 13.8% of those age 65 or over.

== Human resources ==
=== Education ===
==== Primary and secondary education ====
Public education for early childhood, elementary and secondary school students is provided by the Yellville–Summit School District, which leads to graduation from Yellville–Summit High School.

==== Higher education ====
In 1890, Yellville College was established in the city along College Street. It was demolished in 1925. Neither Yellville nor Marion County contain any institutions of higher education. The nearest are Arkansas State University Mountain Home, in Mountain Home, and North Arkansas College in Harrison, both two-year public schools. Nearby four-year education is offered by College of the Ozarks, a Christian liberal-arts college in Point Lookout, Missouri, and Lyon College, a private liberal arts college in Batesville. The nearest four-year public school is Arkansas Tech University in Russellville.

==== Library system ====
The Marion County Library is located at 308 Old Main in Yellville. The library offers books, e-books, media, reference, youth, and genealogy services.

=== Public safety ===
Yellville and Marion County operate under a joint city/county law enforcement agreement.

== Culture and contemporary life ==
=== Buffalo National River ===
Yellville is popular for its proximity to the Buffalo National River, 16 miles (26 km) to the south via State Highway 14. During the summer, tourists visit the area and Yellville becomes a hub for shopping and lodging for them. The Buffalo Point Ranger Station is located approximately 17 miles (27 km) south of Yellville. Activities and services in the area include horseback trail riding, canoeing, and cabin rentals. Other area attractions include the more than 1,000 caves that exist in Marion County, and the famous "Rush" ghost town located in the Buffalo Point area—a turn-of-the-century ghost town from the zinc mining heyday of the area. Abandoned mines are visible along many of the hiking trails at Rush, but are fenced off due to safety concerns. Recent arson has destroyed a few of the historic buildings of the Rush ghost town.

=== Bull Shoals Dam and Reservoir / White River ===
Most of northern Marion County is made up of water—most notably, the waters created by the Bull Shoals Dam. Eastern Marion County's border with Baxter County is marked by the White River. Water skiing, pontoon boating, and fishing are all popular summer activities at the Bull Shoals Lake and White River areas. Yellville is located approximately 15 miles (24 km) southwest of Bull Shoals and serves as an alternate housing and tourist destination for those not staying at the numerous resorts in Bull Shoals, along the White River, or at the confluence of the Buffalo and White rivers near Buffalo City.

=== Fred Berry Conservation Education Center on Crooked Creek ===
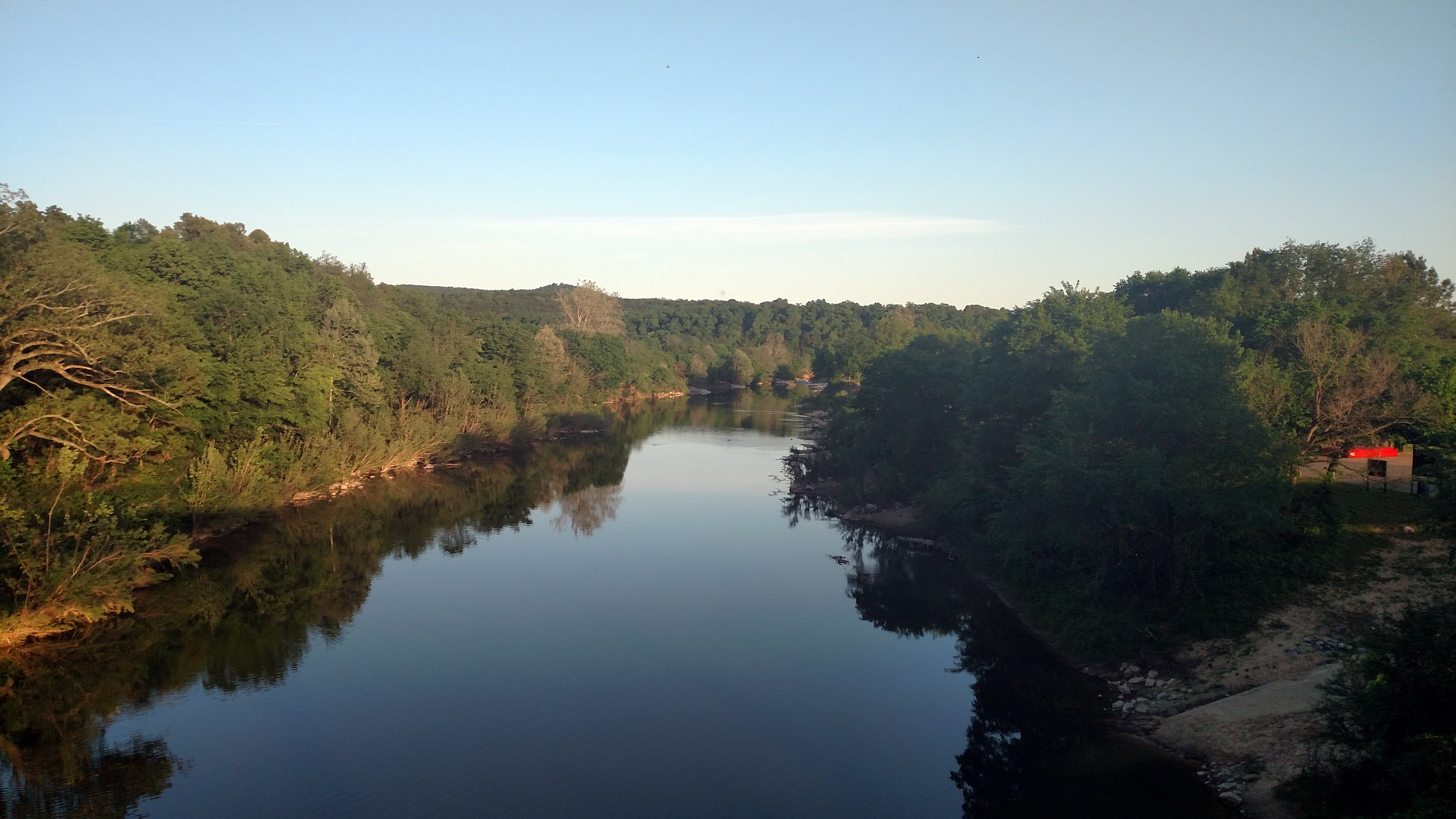
Crooked Creek near the City Park

In 1999, Fred Berry, a former counselor and teacher at the Yellville-Summit School District, donated the funding to create an educational center at Kelley's Access on Crooked Creek, located near the Yellville City Park. With additional donations and a "conservation tax", the plan was put into action. On June 17, 2005, the Fred Berry Conservation Education Center on Crooked Creek opened. It is one of four education centers with the Arkansas Game and Fish Commission. It sits on 471 acres (1.91 km^{2}) of land along a 2.5-mile (4.0 km) stretch of Crooked Creek that was once a dairy farm.

=== Annual cultural events ===
One of the longest traditions in Yellville is the annual Turkey Trot festival sponsored by the Mid-Marion County Rotary Club. Beginning in 1945 with the first turkey dropped from the roof of the Marion County Courthouse, the festival continues today. It is held every second weekend of October with the best-known attraction being live turkeys that are dropped from airplanes over the town square. The event has been criticized in the past by People for the Ethical Treatment of Animals and others. The Turkey Trot festival also includes a pageant, dinners, musical entertainment, a 5 kilometer run, a parade, and a nationally recognized turkey calling contest sponsored by the National Wild Turkey Federation. Crafts and tools related to the hunting of wild turkeys are also sold in streetside booths along the town square.

== Infrastructure ==
=== Major highways ===
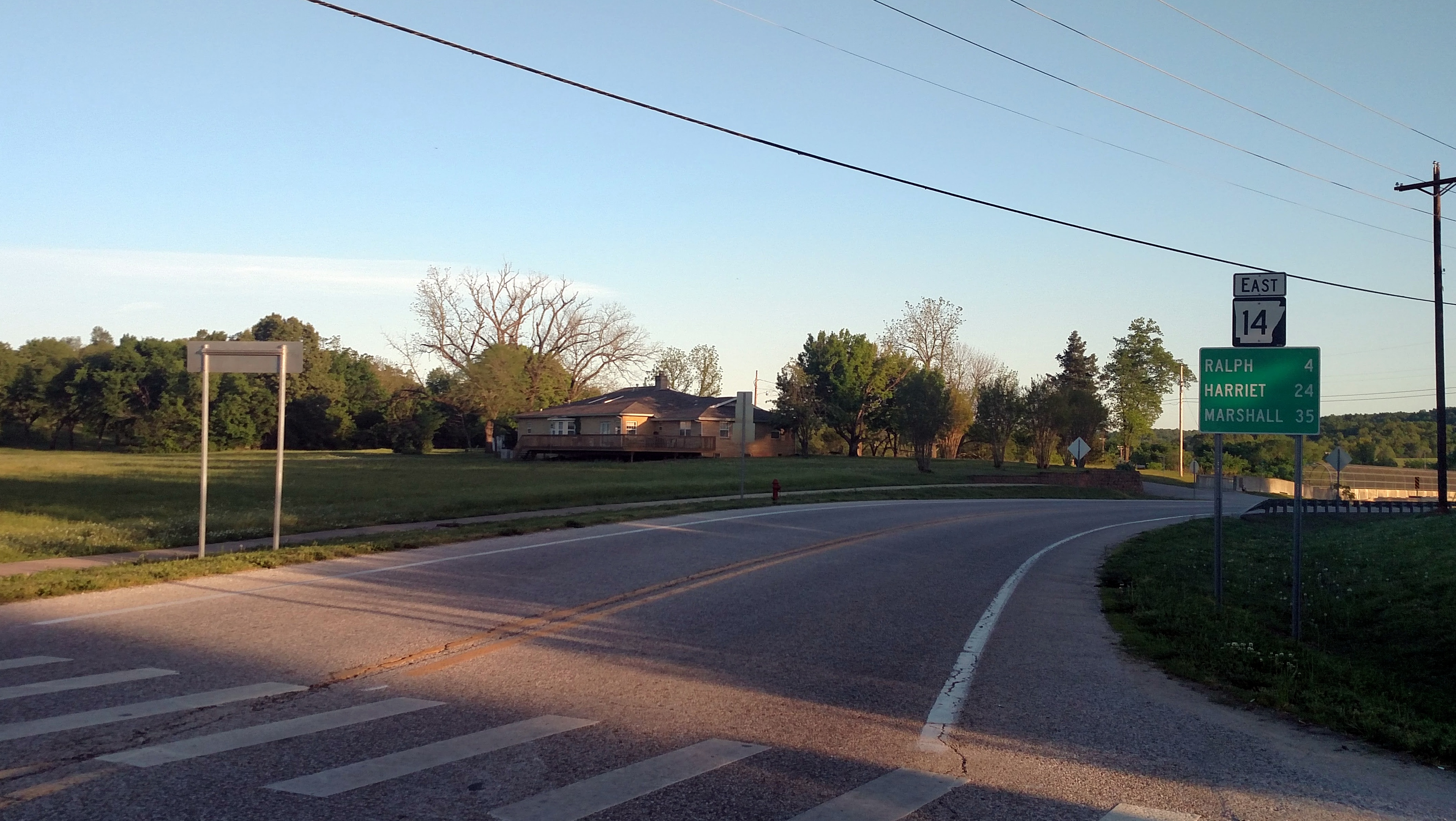
Highway 14 in Yellville

- US 62/US 412
- U.S. Route 62 Business
- Highway 14
- Highway 202
- Highway 235

=== Utilities ===
Entergy Arkansas is the sole provider of electricity in almost all of Marion County, including Yellville. Natural gas service is available from Black Hills Energy. Sanitation is provided by Nabors Sanitation, and cable television service is provided by Yelcot

The Yellville Water Department purchases potable water from the Marion County Regional Water Association, whose source is Bull Shoals Lake. The Yellville Water Department has 2,329 retail population served, and is responsible for maintenance of the water system and customer billing.

== Notable people ==
- Betty Gaedtke (Quapaw), potter
- Kelley Linck, represented Yellville and surrounding area in the Arkansas House of Representatives from 2011 to 2016
- Henry V. Young, lawyer who served in the state legislature from 1939-1945.

== See also ==
- National Register of Historic Places listings in Marion County, Arkansas
