= Morris House =

Morris House or Morris Farm may refer to:

== Canada ==
- Morris House (Halifax)

== United States ==
(by state, then city/town)

- Morris House (Bentonville, Arkansas), listed on the National Register of Historic Places (NRHP) in Benton County
- Morris House (Bradford, Arkansas), listed on the NRHP in White County, Arkansas
- T.H. Morris House, Mammoth Spring, Arkansas, listed on the NRHP in Fulton County
- Jim Morris Barn, Timbo, Arkansas, listed on the NRHP in Stone County
- Wood-Morris-Bonfils House, Denver, Colorado, listed on the NRHP in downtown Denver
- Morris House (New Haven, Connecticut), NRHP-listed
- Johnson-Morris House, Newark, Delaware vicinity, NRHP-listed
- Morris House (Washington, D.C.), NRHP-listed
- Mote-Morris House, Leesburg, Florida, NRHP-listed
- Morris-Butler House, Indianapolis, Indiana, NRHP-listed
- Dr. William Morris Office and House, Southville, Kentucky, listed on the NRHP in Shelby County
- Joseph Henry Morris House, Jackson, Mississippi, listed on the NRHP in Hinds County
- Wright Morris Boyhood House, Central City, Nebraska, NRHP-listed
- Morris-Lull Farm, Morris, New York, NRHP-listed
- Lewis G. Morris House, New York, NY, NRHP-listed
- Morris-Jumel Mansion, New York, NY, NRHP-listed
- Morris Mansion and Mill, Pemberton, New Jersey, NRHP-listed
- Green Morris Farm, Charlotte, North Carolina, listed on the NRHP in Burlington County
- Berryhill-Morris House, Bellbrook, Ohio, NRHP-listed
- Morris House (Circleville, Ohio), NRHP-listed
- Gill-Morris Farm, Circleville, Ohio, NRHP-listed
- C.E. Morris House, Columbus, Ohio, listed on the NRHP in Franklin County
- Morris House (Langston, Oklahoma), listed on the NRHP in Logan County
- Deshler-Morris House, Philadelphia, Pennsylvania, NRHP-listed
- Reynolds-Morris House, Philadelphia, Pennsylvania, NRHP-listed
- Anthony Morris House, Norristown, Pennsylvania, NRHP-listed
- Caldwell-Johnson-Morris Cottage, Anderson, South Carolina, NRHP-listed
- W.W. Morris House, South Fulton, Tennessee, listed on the NRHP in Obion County
- Morris-Browne House, Brownsville, Texas, listed on the NRHP in Cameron County
- Glenn W. Morris House, Houston, Texas, listed on the NRHP in Harris County
- Morris-Moore House, Paris, Texas, listed on the NRHP in Lamar County
- Atkinson-Morris House, Paris, Texas, listed on the NRHP in Lamar County
- Andrew James Morris House, Beaver, Utah, listed on the NRHP in Beaver County
- Josie Bassett Morris Ranch Complex, Dinosaur National Monument, Utah, NRHP-listed
- Richard Vaughen Morris House, Salt Lake City, Utah, NRHP-listed
- Gen. Lewis R. Morris House, Springfield, Vermont, listed on the NRHP in Windsor County
