= Arkansas Highway 87 =

American state highway

Highway 87

Route information
- Maintained by ArDOT

Location
- Country: United States
- State: Arkansas
- Counties: Cleburne, Fulton, Independence, Jackson, Stone, White

Highway system
- Arkansas Highway System; Interstate; US; State; Business; Spurs; Suffixed; Scenic; Heritage
← AR 86	→ AR 88

Arkansas Highway 87 (AR 87) is a designation for four state highways in Arkansas. Created during the 1926 Arkansas state highway numbering, the original alignment remains between Bradford and Pleasant Plains, though it has been revised and extended over the years. The three remaining segments are former county roads, connecting rural communities to local points of interest and other state highways. All three were added to the state highway system in 1973 during a period of system expansion. All segments are maintained by the Arkansas Department of Transportation (ArDOT).

No segment of Highway 87 has been listed as part of the National Highway System, a network of roads important to the nation's economy, defense, and mobility.

== Higginson to Kensett ==
Highway 87
- Location: Higginson–Kensett
- Length: 3.11 mi (5.01 km)
- Existed: May 23, 1973–present

Highway 87 (AR 87, Ark. 87, and Hwy. 87) is a north–south state highway in central White County. The highway straddles the border of the Arkansas Grand Prairie and the Arkansas Valley Hills ecoregions.

=== Route description ===
The highway begins in Higginson, a small rural city, at Highway 11 (Baker Street). It runs due northeast paralleling the Union Pacific Railway tracks through downtown, passing a city park before bridging Glade Creek. On the north side of the bridge, Highway 87 exits the community, continuing to parallel the railroad tracks through a sparsely populated agricultural area. The highway enters the small city of Kensett at the southeast corner, with state maintenance ending just across the city limits at an intersection with Central Avenue. The roadway continues northeast as Morris Avenue under city maintenance.

The ArDOT maintains Highway 87 like all other parts of the state highway system. As a part of these responsibilities, the Department tracks the volume of traffic using its roads in surveys using a metric called average annual daily traffic (AADT). ArDOT estimates the traffic level for a segment of roadway for any average day of the year in these surveys. As of 2017, the only location estimated was near the southern terminus in Higginson, with 440 vehicles per day (VPD).

=== Major intersections ===
The entire route is in White County.

Location	mi	km	Destinations	Notes
Higginson	0.00	0.00	AR 11 (Baker Street) – Des Arc, Searcy	Southern terminus
Kensett	3.11	5.01	End state maintenance at Central Avenue / Morris Avenue	Northern terminus
1.000 mi = 1.609 km; 1.000 km = 0.621 mi

=== History ===
The highway was created by the Arkansas State Highway Commission on May 23, 1973 during a period of highway system expansion following the Arkansas General Assembly passing Act 9 of 1973. The act directed county judges and legislators to designate up to 12 miles (19 km) of county roads as state highways in each county. The alignment has remained unchanged since designation.

== Bradford to Concord ==
Highway 87
- Location: Bradford–Concord
- Length: 26.67 mi (42.92 km)
- Existed: April 1, 1926–present

Highway 87 (AR 87, Ark. 87, and Hwy. 87) is a north–south state highway in Northeast Arkansas. The route begins at Interstate 57 (I-57) in the floodplain and lowlands along the White River, and runs uphill through small towns and concurrent with US 167 to Concord in the Lower Boston Mountains.

=== Route description ===
Highway 87 begins at the eastern side of a diamond interchange with I-57/US 67 in northeastern White County, a sparsely populated rural area. It runs west across the Controlled-access highway before entering the small town of Bradford. In Bradford, the highway becomes Main Street, passing historic properties listed on the National Register of Historic Places (NRHP): the Ward-Stout House, U.L. Hickmon Hardware Store, and the Dr. Lovell House. The highway crosses the Union Pacific Railway tracks in downtown Bradford just east of an intersection with Highway 367 (2nd Street). West of downtown, Highway 87 passes Bradford High School before exiting the city heading west. Highway 87 becomes a rural highway, passing farmsteads like the NRHP-listed Marshall Hickmon Homestead, and briefly entering Jackson County before returning to White County. Near Denmark, the highway intersects US 167, forming a concurrency heading north.

US 167/AR 87 run together into Independence County to the small town of Pleasant Plains in the southern part of the county. Highway 87 turns from US 167 at a junction with Highway 157. Highway 157 and Highway 87 form a concurrency westward into Pleasant Plains for 0.3 miles (0.48 km) as Blackland Road before Highway 157 turns south as Batesville Boulevard, leaving Highway 87 to continue west as Floral Road. West of Pleasant Plains, Highway 87 passes through a rural area dotted with residences and passes through two unincorporated communities, Cedar Grove and Floral, before entering Cleburne County.

In northeastern Cleburne County, Highway 87 passes through a sparsely populated area, and the community of Banner before entering Concord. The route terminates in the small town at Highway 25 (Heber Springs Road).

=== Major intersections ===
County	Location	mi	km	Destinations	Notes
White		0.00	0.00	I-57 / US 67 – St. Louis, Little Rock	Southern terminus
White	Bradford	0.80	1.29	AR 367 (2nd Street) – Bald Knob, Newport	Former US 67
Jackson	No major junctions				
White	Denmark	10.39	16.72	US 167 south – Bald Knob, Batesville	Begin US 167 overlap
See US 167 and Highway 157
Independence	Pleasant Plains	0.00	0.00	AR 157 south – Sunnydale, Oil Trough	End AR 157 overlap
Cleburne	Concord	16.28	26.20	AR 25 (Heber Springs Road) – Heber Springs, Batesville	Northern terminus
1.000 mi = 1.609 km; 1.000 km = 0.621 mi: Concurrency terminus

=== History ===
Highway 87 between Bradford and Pleasant Plains was an original Arkansas state highway, created on April 1, 1926. On the September 1928 map, State Road 11 supplanted State Road 87 between Pleasant Plains and Denmark, with State Road 11 continuing due south from Denmark to Bald Knob on an "impassible road" (the present-day alignment of US 167). The remaining route was replaced by State Road 11 on the September 1929 map, with the route between Denmark and Bald Knob disappearing from the map. On the 1937 Official Highway Service Map, Highway 87 was redesignated along the "impassible road", now marked as "graded earth" in White County and "gravel or stone surfaced" in Jackson County. On the 1945 state highway map, the Highway 11 designation was assigned to the roadway between Denmark and Bald Knob, with Highway 87 running along its present alignment between Bradford and Denmark as a gravel road.

The segment from Pleasant Plains to Concord was added on July 10, 1957, during a period of expansion in the state highway system. The Arkansas General Assembly passed the Act 148 of 1957, the Milum Road Act, creating 10–12 miles (16–19 km) of new state highways in each county. The highway was extended east from downtown Bradford to the present-day freeway alignment of US 67 on April 17, 1986. It was realigned around US 167 in 1998, including adopting a former segment of US 167 to connect to the new US 167 alignment.

== Mountain View to Fifty Six ==
Highway 87
- Location: Stone County, Arkansas
- Length: 10.05 mi (16.17 km)
- Existed: March 28, 1973–present

Highway 87 (AR 87, Ark. 87, and Hwy. 87) is a north–south state highway in Stone County, Arkansas.

=== Route description ===
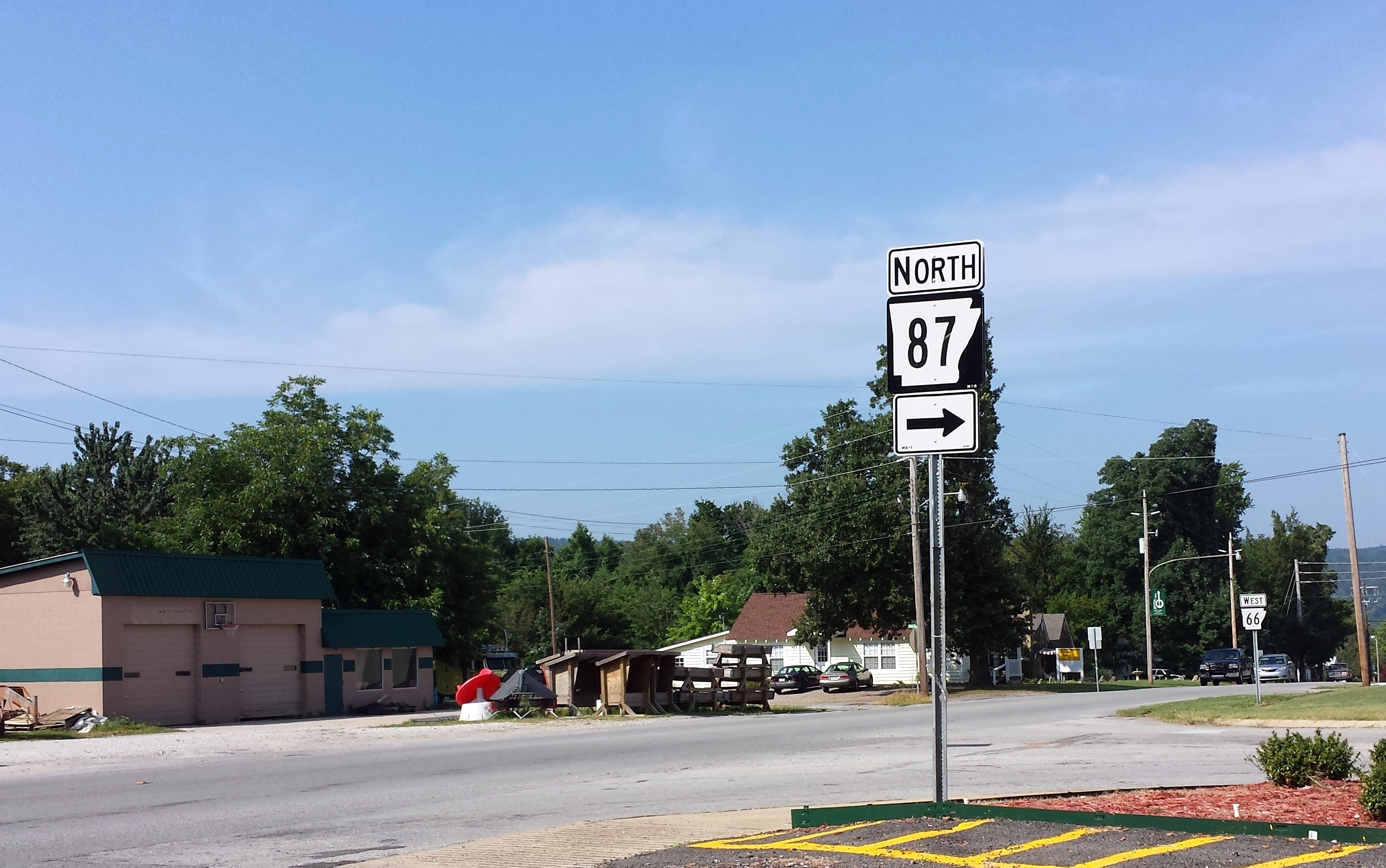
Highway 87 southern terminus

Mountain View is established in a small outcropping of the relatively flat Springfield Plateau, which quickly gives rise to the steeper Ozark Highlands as the route runs north. Highway 87 begins at Highway 66 (Main Street) in Mountain View, the small-town county seat of Stone County in the Ozark Mountains. It begins west of downtown Mountain View across the street from the historic Brewer's Mill and runs north as Lancaster Avenue before turning left. The highway passes the Stone County Fairgrounds and a city park before exiting the city northbound, entering a sparsely populated, forested area. Highway 87 winds and curves, crossing Sylamore Creek and entering the Ozark National Forest just north of the unincorporated community of Gayler. Shortly after entering the National Forest, Highway terminates at Highway 14, the Sylamore Scenic Byway, near the entrance to Blanchard Springs Caverns, a cave system owned by the United States Forest Service.

ArDOT estimates average daily traffic on the route ranges from 1100 vehicles per day (VPD) near the southern terminus in Mountain Home, to 360 VPD near the northern terminus.

=== Major intersections ===
The entire route is in Stone County.

Location	mi	km	Destinations	Notes
Mountain View	0.00	0.00	AR 66 (Main Street)	Southern terminus
	10.05	16.17	AR 14 (Sylamore Scenic Byway) – Fifty Six	Northern terminus
1.000 mi = 1.609 km; 1.000 km = 0.621 mi

=== History ===
The highway was designated on March 28, 1973 pursuant to Act 9 of 1973 by the Arkansas General Assembly. The act directed county judges and legislators to designate up to 12 miles (19 km) of county roads as state highways in each county. The alignment has not changed since designation.

== Elizabeth to Missouri ==
Highway 87
- Location: Fulton County, Arkansas
- Length: 13.68 mi (22.02 km)
- Existed: May 23, 1973–present

Highway 87 (AR 87, Ark. 87, and Hwy. 87) is a north–south state highway in Fulton County, Arkansas.

=== Route description ===
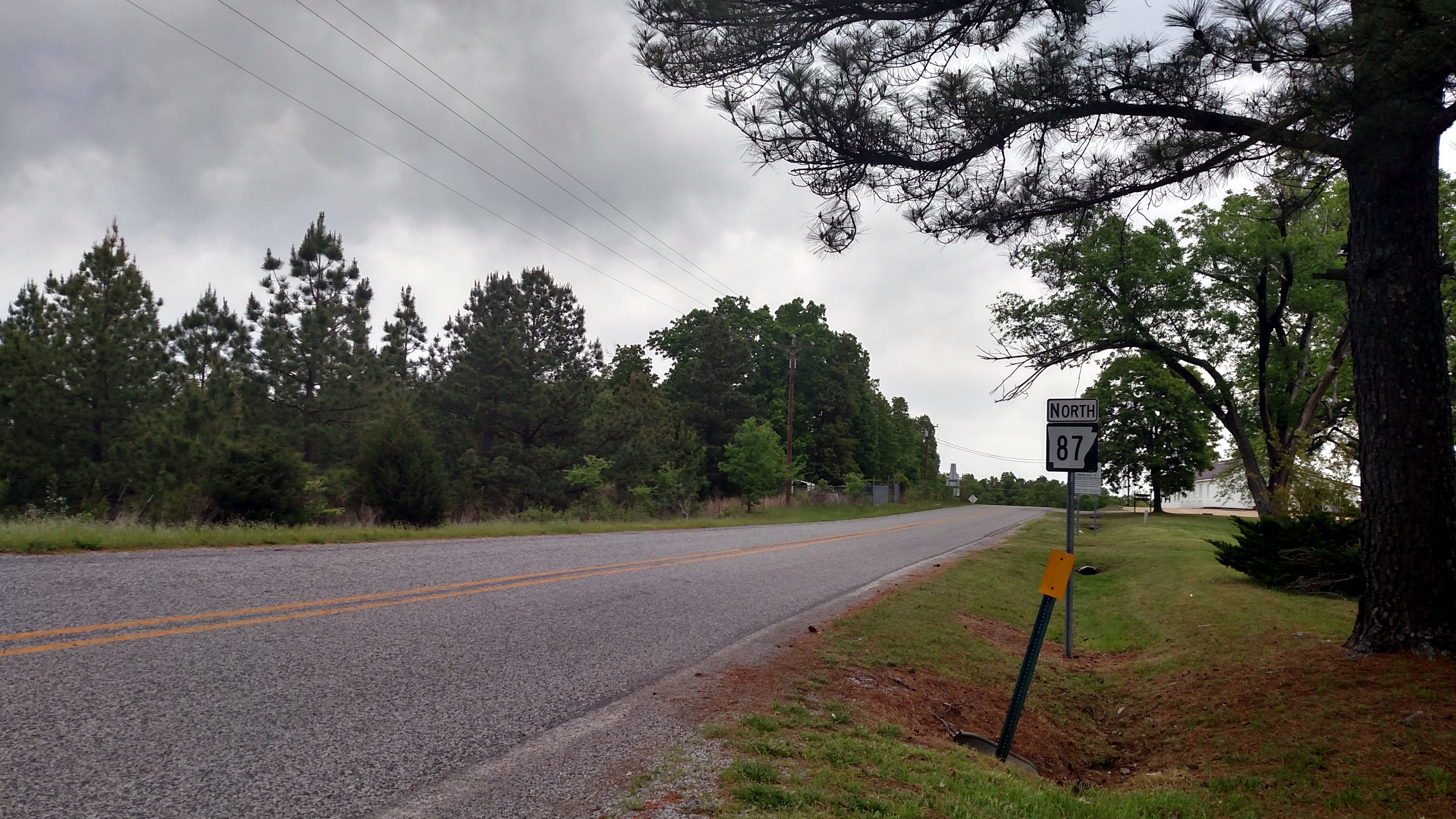
First Highway 87 reassurance marker north of the US62/US 412 intersection

Highway 87 begins at Elizabeth, an unincorporated community in western Fulton County. The southern terminus is an intersection with Elizabeth Road, a paved road continuing east toward Mitchell and Salem. The intersection also includes the eastern terminus of Boggy Point Cove, also paved, which runs southwest toward Norfork Lake. Both other roadways at the southern terminus are under the jurisdiction of the Fulton County Road Department. Highway 87 runs north from Elizabeth through a very sparsely populated area of the Central Plateau of the Ozark Highlands. The highway crosses Big Creek before an intersection with US 62/US 412 just west of Gepp. Continuing north, Highway 87 remains rural in character. The highway crosses Bennett's River near Vidette, and Poor Hollow Branch and Little Creek in the northwest corner of the county. Highway 87 also intersects Sparrow Road, the county road leading to the County Line School and Lodge, a historic school, Freemason lodge, and community building listed on the NRHP. North of the intersection, Highway 87 continues toward the Missouri state line, where it continues as Missouri Supplemental Route AR.

The highway is a low traffic roadway. North of US 62/US 412, the route saw an average of 370 vehicles per day (VPD), with a count of 540 just south of the intersection.

=== Major intersections ===
The entire route is in Fulton County.

Location	mi	km	Destinations	Notes
Elizabeth	0.00	0.00	CR 2448 (Elizabeth Road / Boggy Point Cove)	Southern terminus
Gepp	4.47	7.19	US 62 / US 412 – Mountain Home, Salem	
	13.68	22.02	Route AR north	Continuation into Missouri
1.000 mi = 1.609 km; 1.000 km = 0.621 mi

=== History ===
The route was created on May 23, 1973 by the Arkansas State Highway Commission pursuant to Act 9 of 1973 by the Arkansas General Assembly. The act directed county judges and legislators to designate up to 12 miles (19 km) of county roads as state highways in each county. The following year, the highway was extended to the Missouri state line to align with the proposed addition of Supplemental Route AR to the Missouri State Highway System.
