= Marshall Hickmon Homestead =

Historic house in Arkansas, United States

- U.S. National Register of Historic Places
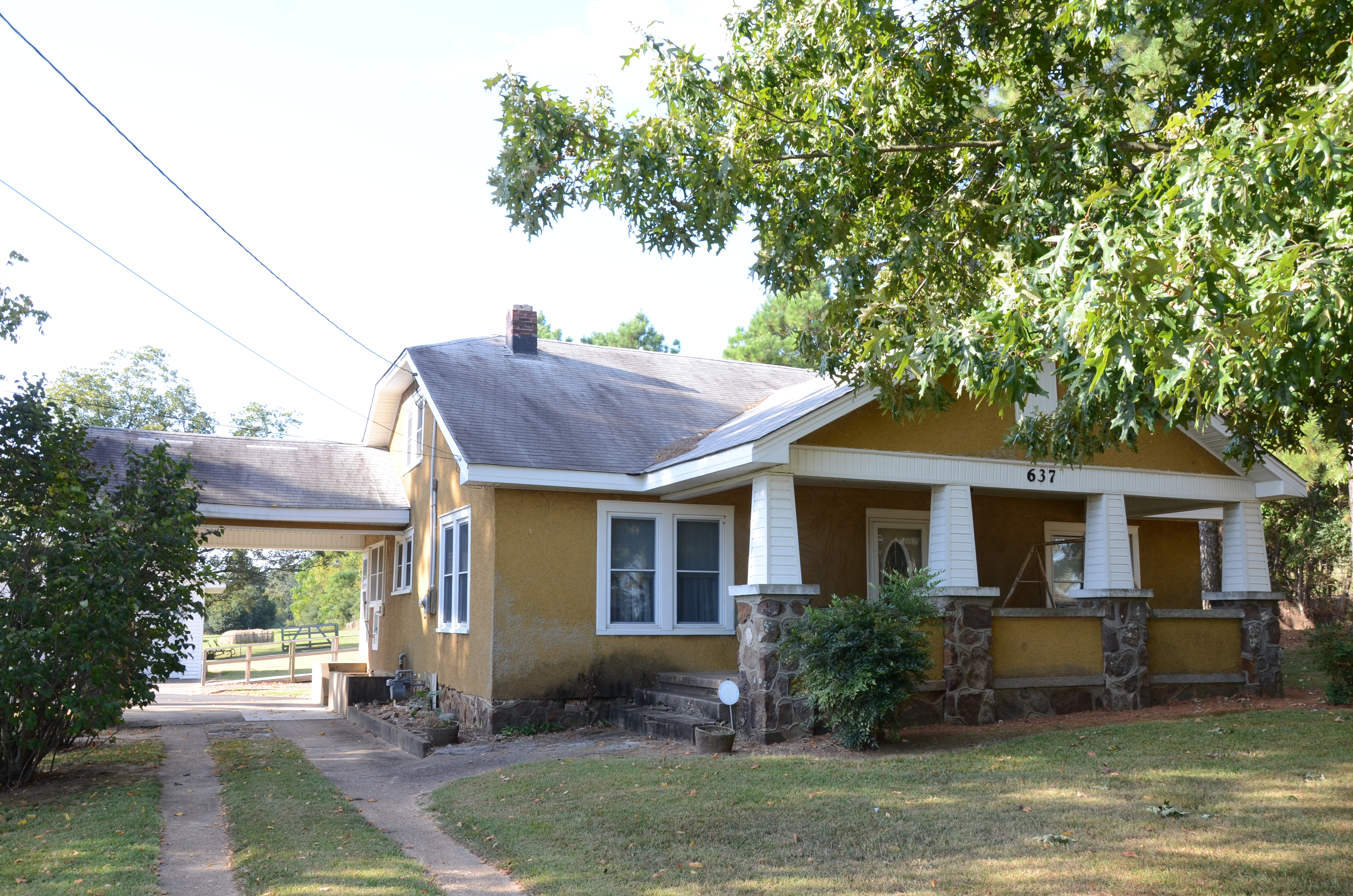

- Location within Arkansas Location within the United States
- Location: AR 87, Bradford, Arkansas
- Coordinates: 35°25′28″N 91°27′55″W
- Area: 2 acres (0.81 ha)
- Built by: Marshall Hickmon
- Architectural style: Bungalow/craftsman
- MPS: White County MPS
- NRHP reference No.: 91001317
- Added to NRHP: July 21, 1992

The Marshall Hickmon Homestead is a historic house on Arkansas Highway 87 in Bradford, Arkansas. It is a 1 1/2-story wood-frame structure, clad in stucco, with a jerkin-headed side-gable roof and a concrete foundation. Most of its front facade is sheltered by a gabled porch, supported by sloping square columns finished in shingles and set on concrete piers. The house was built in 1933, and is a high quality local example of Craftsman architecture.

The house was listed on the National Register of Historic Places in 1992.

== See also ==
- National Register of Historic Places listings in White County, Arkansas
