= AR 66 =

AR 66 may refer to

- Arado Ar 66, an aircraft
- Arkansas Highway 66, a road
