= Morris House (Bradford, Arkansas) =

Historic house in Arkansas, United States

- U.S. National Register of Historic Places
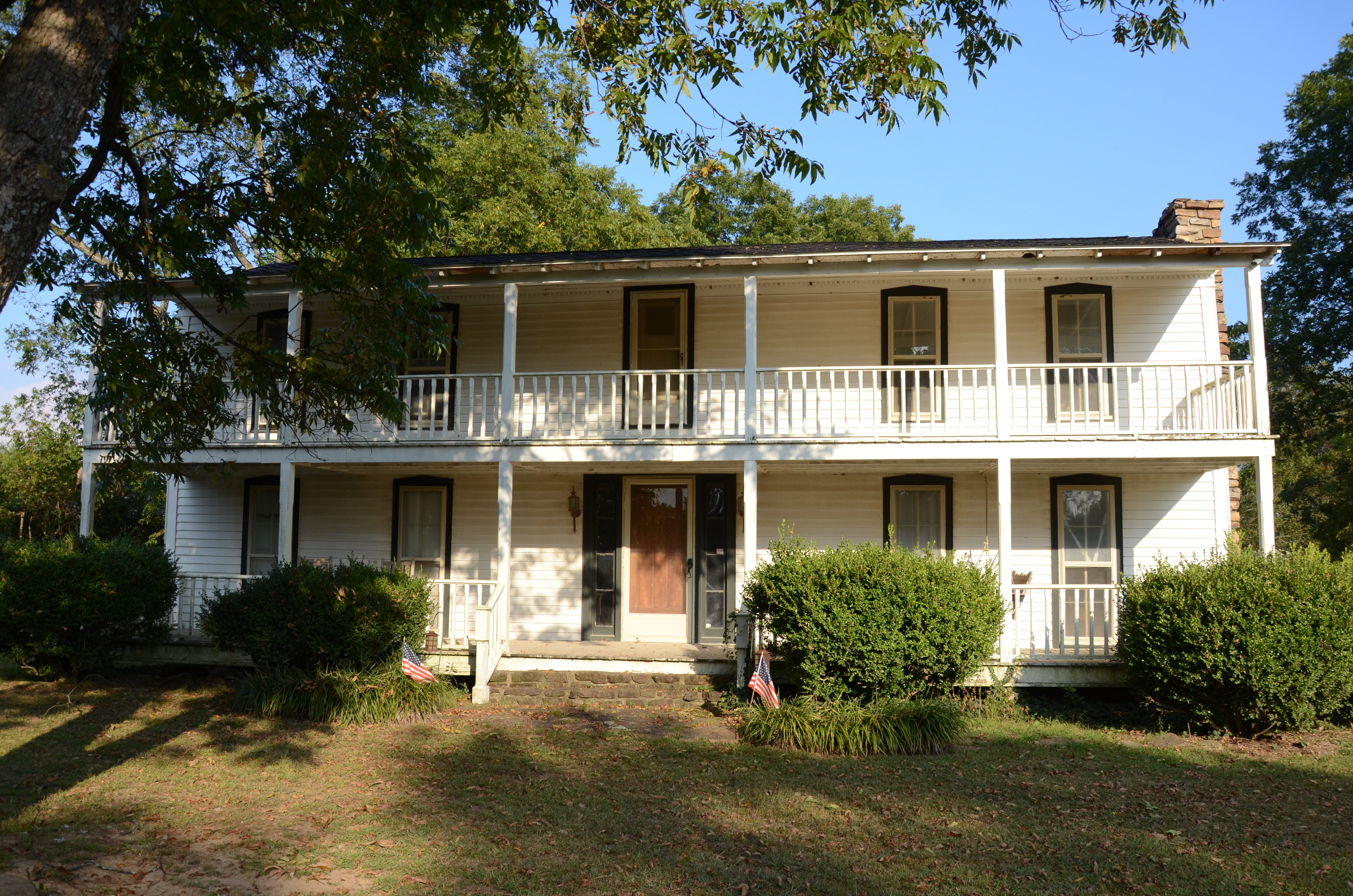

- Location within Arkansas Location within the United States
- Location: Morris Dr., Bradford, Arkansas vicinity
- Coordinates: 35°29′3″N 91°37′31″W
- Area: 1 acre (0.40 ha)
- Built: 1860
- Built by: J.T. Ransom
- Architectural style: Double-pile central-hall
- NRHP reference No.: 78000641
- Added to NRHP: December 4, 1978

The Morris House is a historic house in rural White County, Arkansas. It is located northwest of Bradford, near the junction of Morris Drive and Jerry Smith Road. It is two story wood-frame structure, with a gabled roof and weatherboard siding. It is a double-pile central-hall plan, with five bays across, and a two-story porch with square posts. The house was built in 1860 for Henry Morris, one of the first settlers of the area.

The house was listed on the National Register of Historic Places in 1978.

== See also ==
- National Register of Historic Places listings in White County, Arkansas
