= William E. Finck =

American politician

William Edward Finck
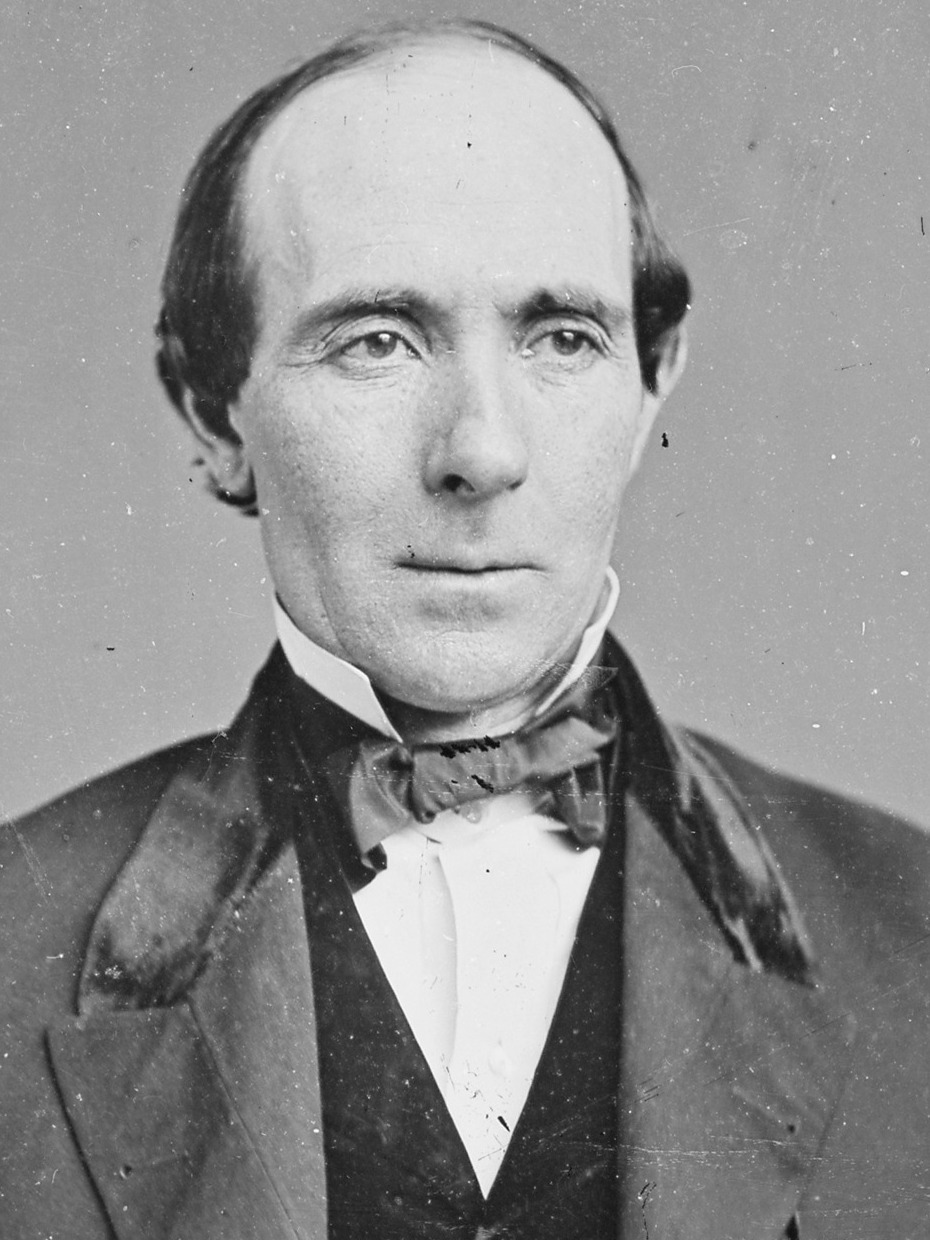

Member of the U.S. House of Representatives from Ohio's 12th district
- In office March 4, 1863 – March 3, 1867
- Preceded by: Samuel S. Cox
- Succeeded by: Philadelph Van Trump
- In office December 7, 1874 – March 3, 1875
- Preceded by: Hugh J. Jewett
- Succeeded by: Ansel T. Walling

Member of the Ohio Senate from the 15th district
- In office January 5, 1852 – January 1, 1854
- Preceded by: new district
- Succeeded by: Hugh J. Jewett
- In office January 6, 1862 – January 3, 1864
- Preceded by: Charles W. Potwin
- Succeeded by: Thomas J. Magannis

Personal details
- Born: September 1, 1822 Somerset, Ohio, U.S.
- Died: January 25, 1901 (aged 78) Somerset, Ohio, U.S.
- Resting place: Holy Trinity Cemetery
- Party: Whig; Democratic
- Education: St. Joseph's College (Ohio)

William Edward Finck (September 1, 1822 – January 25, 1901) was a U.S. representative from Ohio.

Born in Somerset, Ohio, Finck attended the public schools and St. Joseph's College (Ohio). He studied law. He was admitted to the bar in 1843 and commenced practice in Somerset, Ohio. He was an unsuccessful candidate for election in 1850 to the Thirty-second Congress. He served as member of the State senate in 1851. He served as delegate to the Whig National Convention in 1852. He was again a member of the State senate in 1861.

Finck was elected as a Democrat to the Thirty-eighth and Thirty-ninth Congresses (March 4, 1863 – March 3, 1867). He was an unsuccessful Democratic candidate for judge of the Ohio Supreme Court in 1868 and 1876.

Finck was elected as a Democrat to the Forty-third Congress to fill the vacancy caused by the resignation of Hugh J. Jewett and served from December 7, 1874, to March 3, 1875. He resumed the practice of law.

He died in Somerset, Ohio, January 25, 1901. He was interred in Holy Trinity Cemetery.

== Sources ==
- United States Congress. "William E. Finck (id: F000118)". Biographical Directory of the United States Congress.

U.S. House of Representatives
| Preceded by Samuel S. Cox | Member of the U.S. House of Representatives from Ohio's 12th congressional district March 4, 1863 – March 3, 1867 | Succeeded by Philadelph Van Trump |
| Preceded by Hugh J. Jewett | Member of the U.S. House of Representatives from Ohio's 12th congressional district December 7, 1874 – March 3, 1875 | Succeeded by Ansel T. Walling |
