= Philadelph Van Trump =

American politician

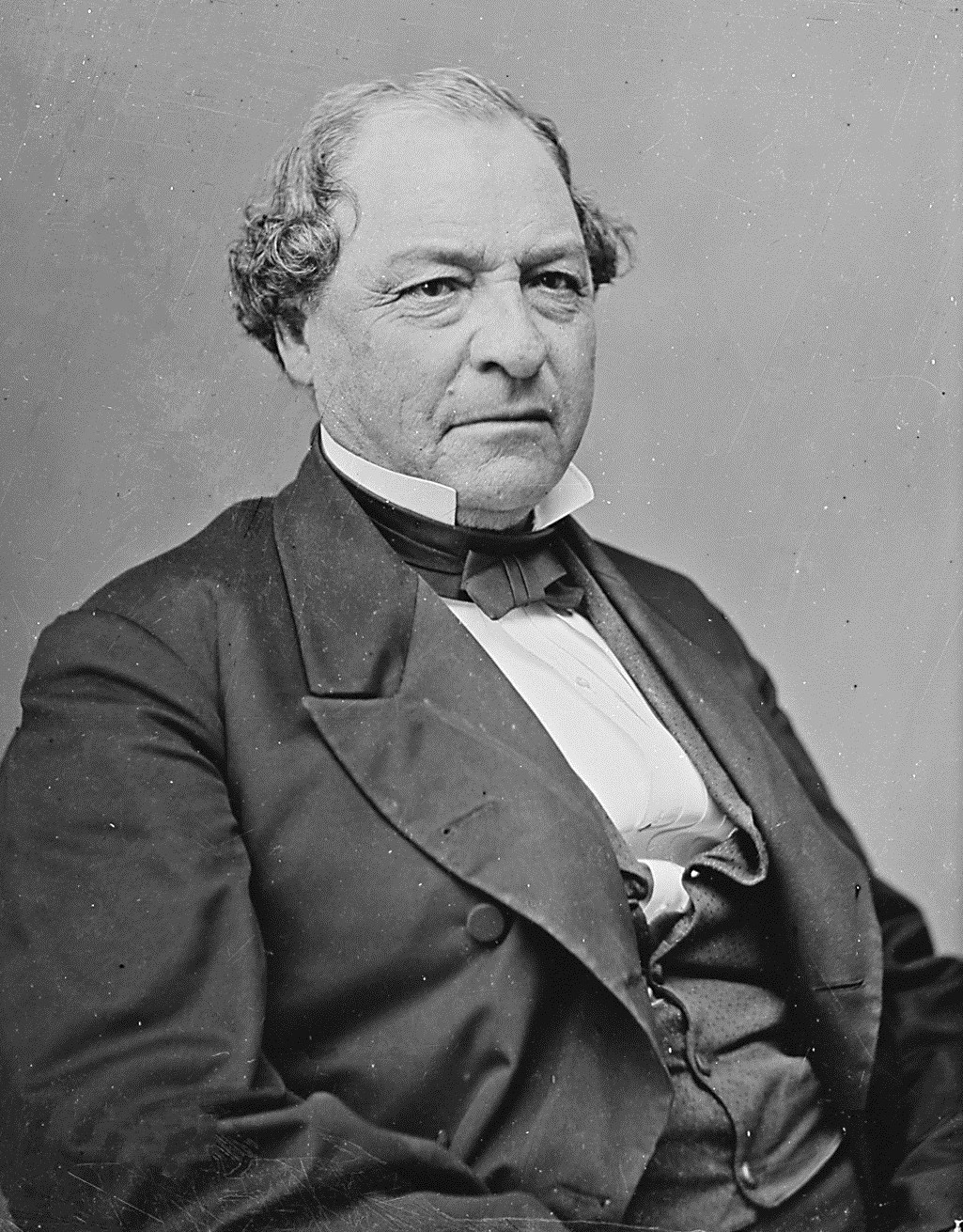

Member of the U.S. House of Representatives from Ohio's 12th district
- In office March 4, 1867 – March 3, 1873
- Preceded by: William E. Finck
- Succeeded by: Hugh J. Jewett

Personal details
- Born: November 15, 1810 Lancaster, Ohio, U.S.
- Died: July 31, 1874 (aged 63) Lancaster, Ohio, U.S.
- Resting place: Elmwood Cemetery
- Party: Democratic
- Other political affiliations: Whig; American

Philadelph Van Trump (November 15, 1810 – July 31, 1874) was an American politician who served three terms as a U.S. representative from Ohio from 1867 to 1873.

== Biography ==
Born in Lancaster, Ohio, Van Trump attended a public school. He learned the art of printing and subsequently became editor of the Gazette and Enquirer at Lancaster. He also studied law and was admitted to the bar.

=== Early career ===
He started practice in Lancaster on May 14, 1838. He served as delegate to the Whig National Convention in 1852. In 1857, Van Trump was an unsuccessful candidate of the American Party for Governor.

He served as delegate to the Bell and Everett State convention in 1860 and served as president. He served as judge of the court of common pleas from 1862 to 1867. Van Trump failed in elections to be a judge on the Supreme Court of Ohio in 1863, 1864, and 1865.

=== Congress ===
Van Trump was elected as a Democrat to the Fortieth, Forty-first, and Forty-second Congresses (March 4, 1867 – March 3, 1873). He was not a candidate for renomination in 1872.

=== Later career ===
He served as president of the Democratic State convention in 1869. Van Trump resumed the practice of law in Lancaster, Ohio.

=== Death and burial ===
He died there on July 31, 1874. He is buried in Elmwood Cemetery.

== Sources ==
- United States Congress. "Philadelph Van Trump (id: V000060)". Biographical Directory of the United States Congress.

Party political offices
Preceded by Allen Trimble	Know Nothing nominee for Governor of Ohio; 1857	Succeeded by None
U.S. House of Representatives
Preceded by William E. Finck	Member of the U.S. House of Representatives from Ohio's 12th congressional district March 4, 1867–March 3, 1873	Succeeded by Hugh J. Jewett
