= 1857 Ohio gubernatorial election =

- October 13, 1857
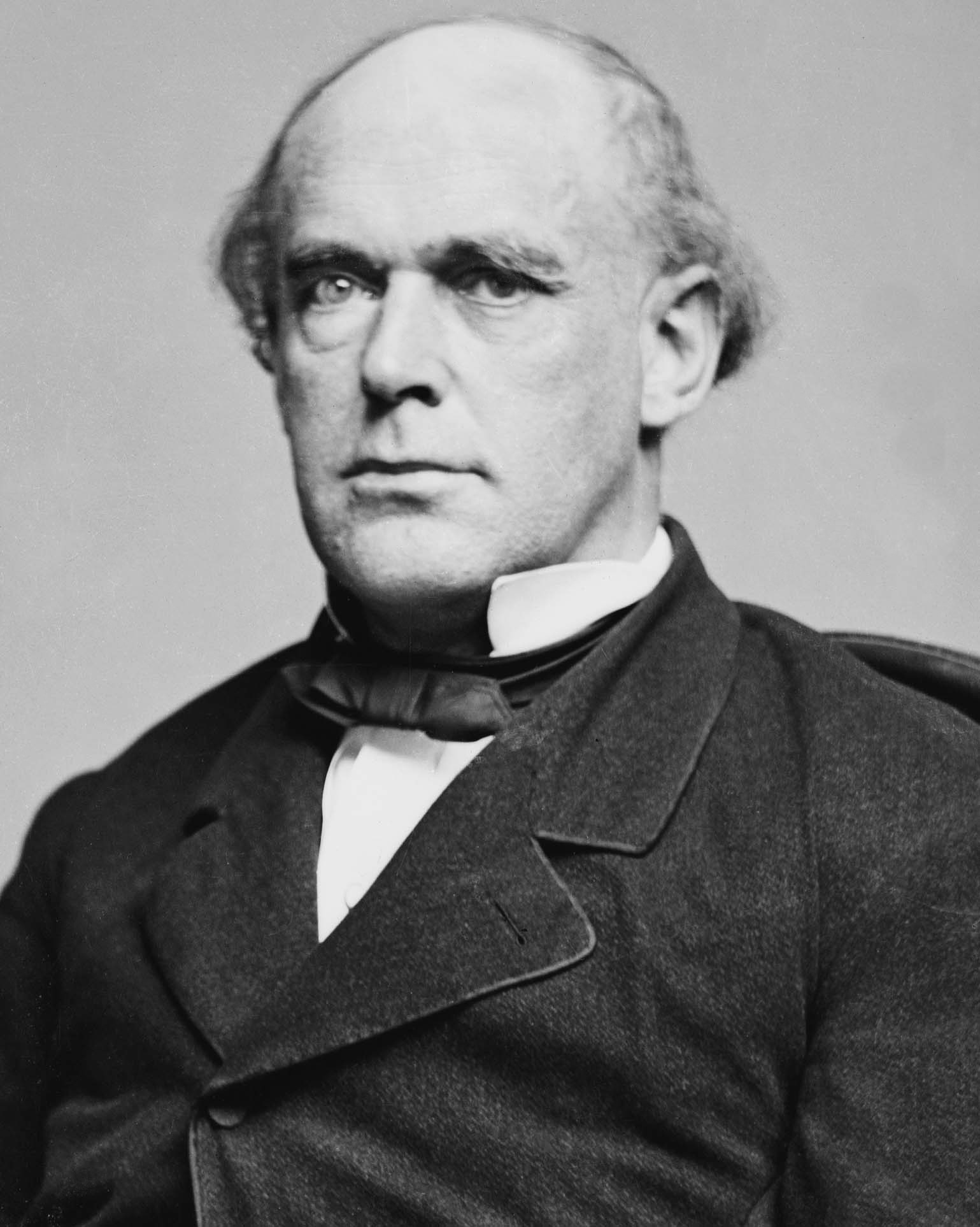

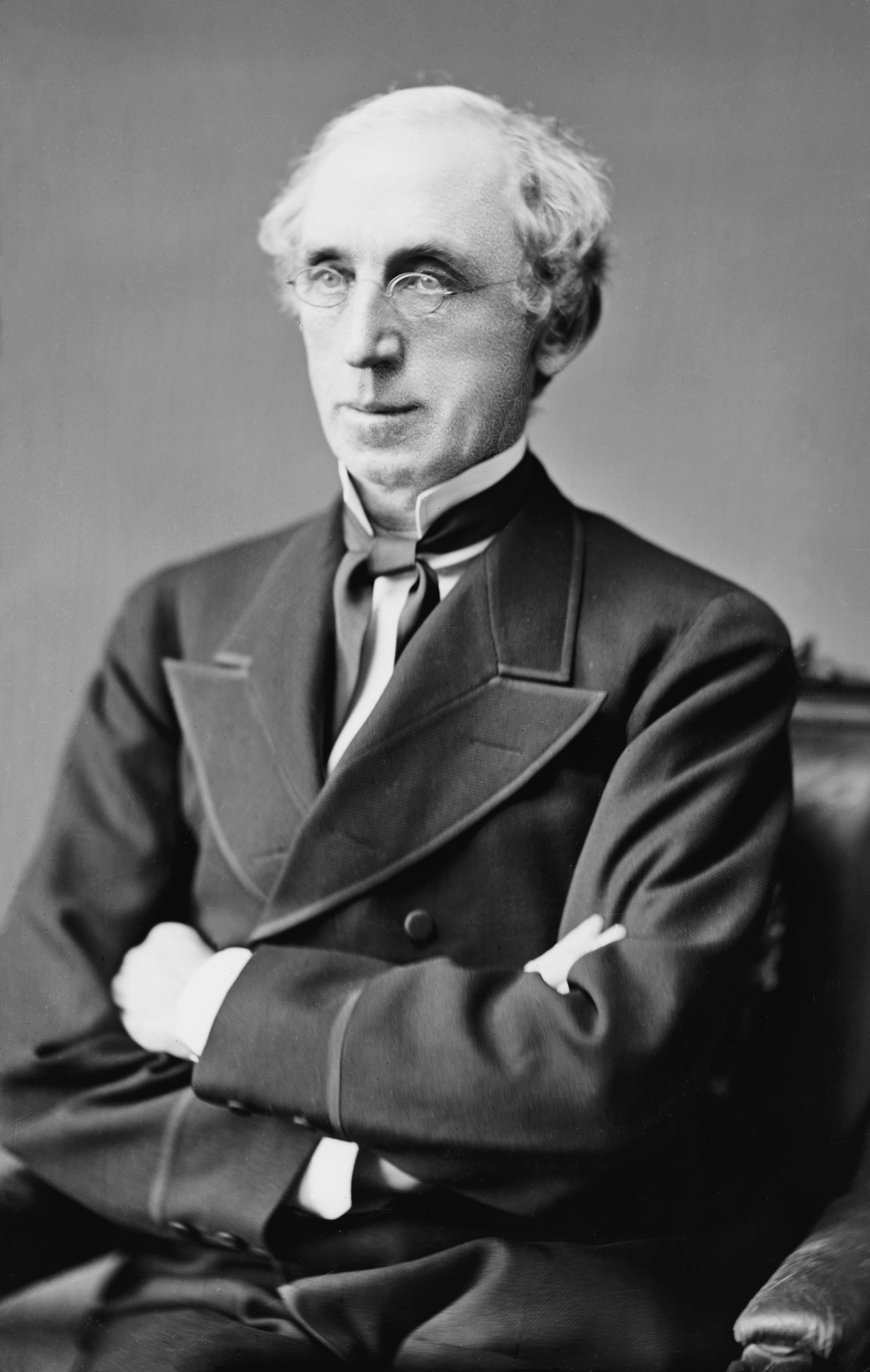
Nominee	Salmon P. Chase	Henry B. Payne
Party	Republican	Democratic
Popular vote	160,568	159,065
Percentage	48.63%	48.18%
- County results Chase: 40–50% 50–60% 60–70% 70–80% Payne: 40–50% 50–60% 60–70% 70–80%
Governor before election
Salmon P. Chase
Republican
Elected Governor
Salmon P. Chase
Republican

The 1857 Ohio gubernatorial election was held on October 13, 1857. Incumbent Republican Salmon P. Chase defeated Democratic nominee Henry B. Payne with 48.67% of the vote.

== General election ==
=== Candidates ===
==== Major party candidates ====
- Salmon P. Chase, Republican
- Henry B. Payne, Democratic

==== Other candidates ====
- Philadelph Van Trump, American
- Thomas B. McCormick, Radical Abolitionist

=== Results ===
1857 Ohio gubernatorial election
Party	Candidate	Votes	%	±%
Republican	Salmon P. Chase (incumbent)	160,568	48.63	
Democratic	Henry B. Payne	159,065	48.18	
Know Nothing	Philadelph Van Trump	10,272	3.11	
Radical Abolitionist	Thomas B. McCormick	155	0.05	
Write-in		109	0.03	
Majority		1,503		
Turnout		330,169		
Republican hold		Swing		
