= Clarence Anderson Barn =

Historic barn in Newnata, Arkansas, US

- U.S. National Register of Historic Places
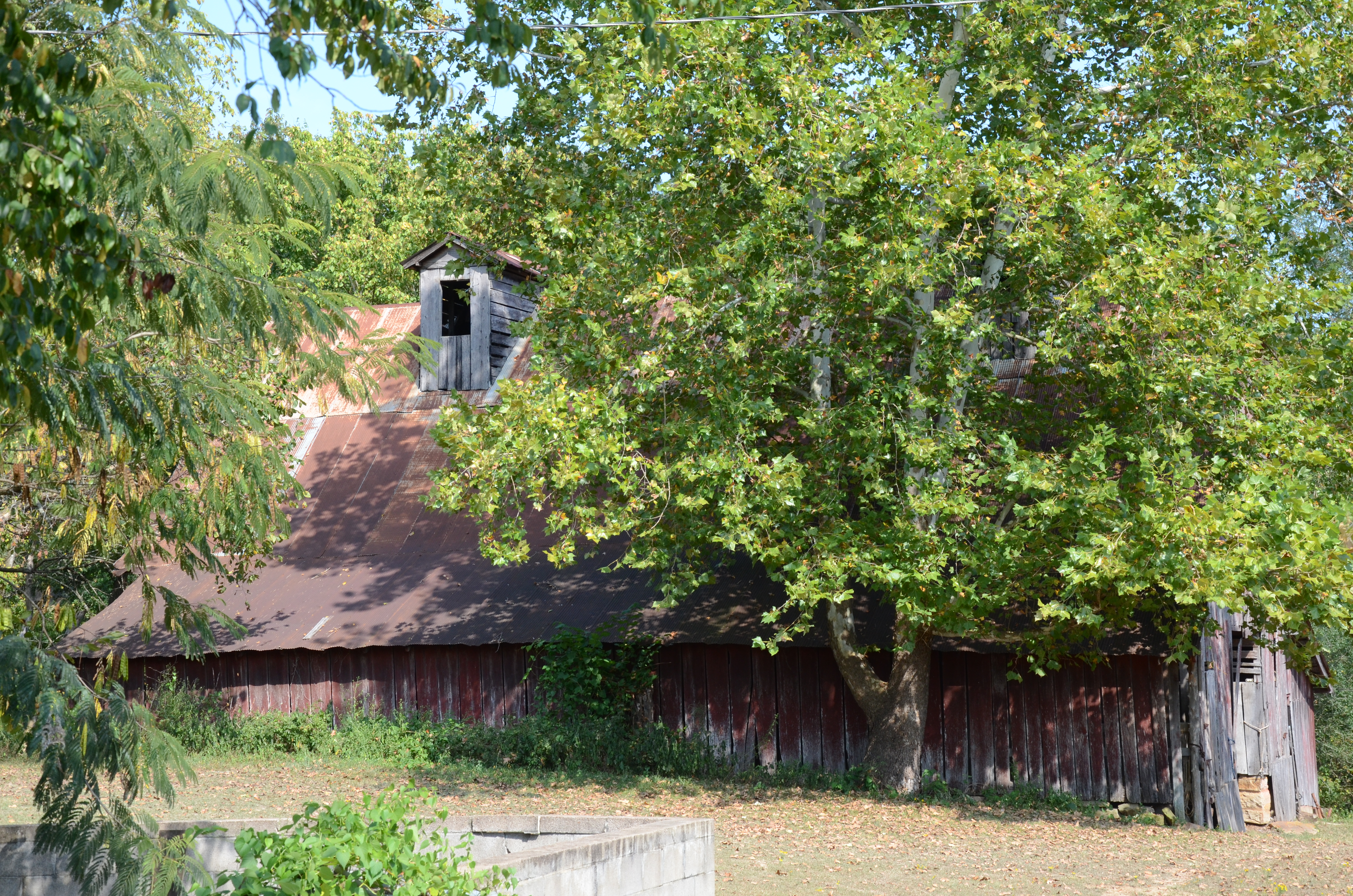

- Location within Arkansas Location within the United States
- Location: AR 66, Newnata, Arkansas
- Coordinates: 35°53′20″N 92°15′3″W
- Area: less than one acre
- Built: 1925
- Built by: Paul Smith
- Architectural style: Traverse Crib plan
- MPS: Stone County MRA
- NRHP reference No.: 85002217
- Added to NRHP: September 17, 1985

The Clarence Anderson Barn is a historic barn on the north side of Arkansas Highway 66 in the hamlet of Newnata, Arkansas. It is a two-story wood-frame structure, with vertical board siding and enclosed sheds on the side. The interior is organized in a transverse crib manner. Built in 1925, the building is distinctive for the pair of gable-roof dormers placed near the ridge line; this sort of feature is not usually found on barns in the region.

The barn was listed on the National Register of Historic Places in 1985.

== See also ==
- National Register of Historic Places listings in Stone County, Arkansas
