= U.L. Hickmon Hardware Store =

- U.S. National Register of Historic Places
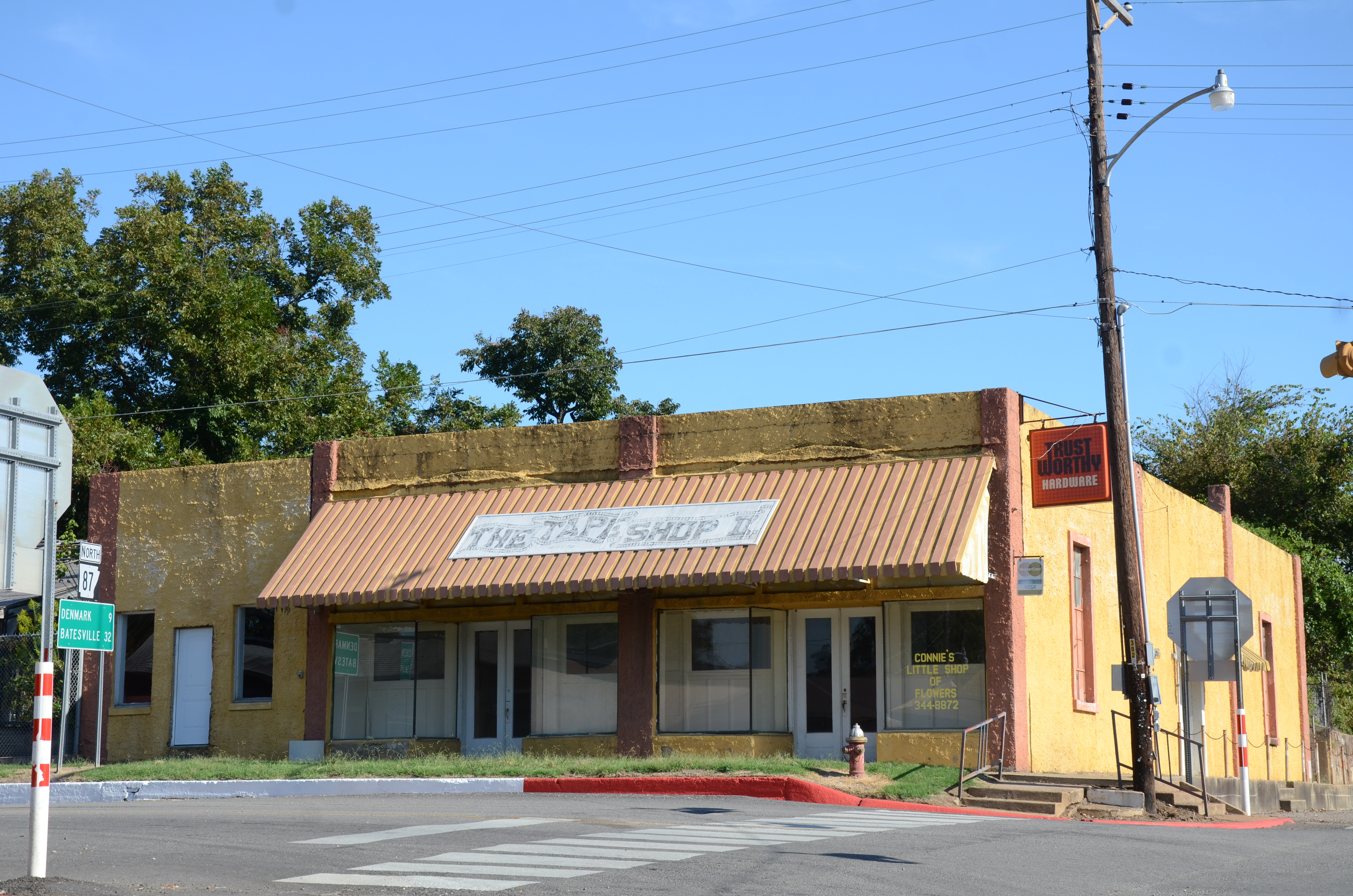

- Location within Arkansas Location within the United States
- Location: Jct. of Main and Second Sts., Bradford, Arkansas
- Coordinates: 35°25′25″N 91°27′20″W
- Area: less than one acre
- Built: 1925
- Architect: John Calhoun
- Architectural style: Vernacular commercial
- MPS: White County MPS
- NRHP reference No.: 91001316
- Added to NRHP: September 5, 1991

The U.L. Hickmon Hardware Store is a historic commercial building at 2nd and Main Streets in Bradford, Arkansas. It is a single story masonry structure, built out of poured concrete clad in stucco. It has two storefronts separated by a slightly projecting pier, each with fixed-frame glass display windows flanking recessed double-door entries. A metal awning extends across the width of the main facade. Built in 1925, it is unusual period construction within White County for its use of concrete as the primary building material.

The building was listed on the National Register of Historic Places in 1991.

== See also ==
- National Register of Historic Places listings in White County, Arkansas
