= C.L. Smith & Son General Store =

Historic commercial building

- C. L. Smith & Son General Store
- U.S. National Register of Historic Places
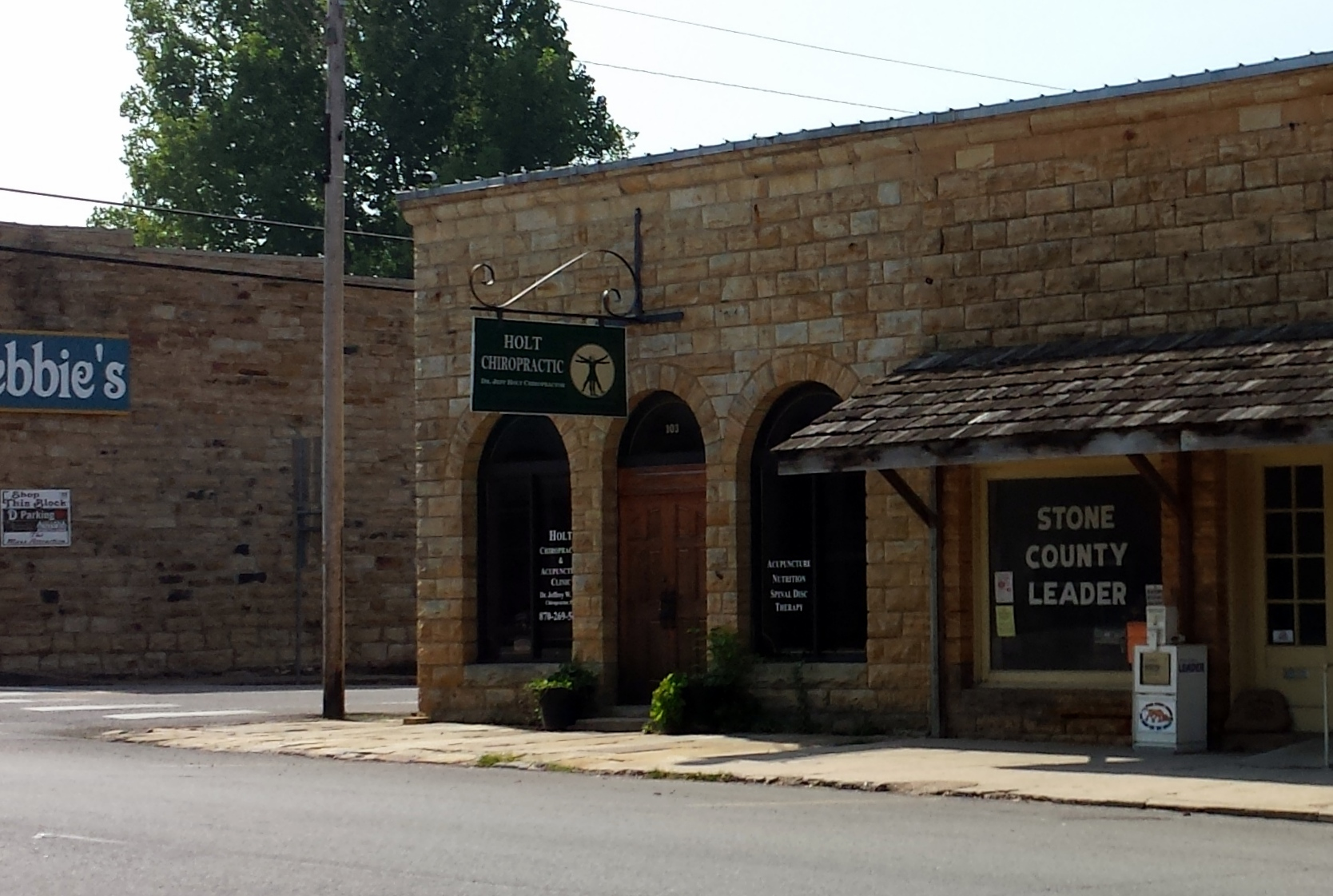

- Location within Arkansas Location within the United States
- Location: AR 66, Mountain View, Arkansas
- Coordinates: 35°52′6″N 92°7′5″W
- Area: less than one acre
- Built: 1905
- Built by: Brewer Bros. (stone masons)
- Architectural style: Romanesque
- MPS: Stone County MRA
- NRHP reference No.: 85002240
- Added to NRHP: September 17, 1985

The C.L. Smith & Son General Store is a historic commercial building on Arkansas Highway 66, opposite the courthouse square, in central Mountain View, Arkansas. It is a single-story stone structure, with vernacular Romanesque styling consisting of round-arch window openings flanking a similar entry opening. The front facade is topped by a parapet, which obscures the flat roof, and is stepped down the east side. The store was built in 1905, and is one of the early stone buildings that typify the city center's architecture.

The building was listed on the National Register of Historic Places in 1985.

== See also ==
- National Register of Historic Places listings in Stone County, Arkansas
