= Ansel T. Walling =

American politician

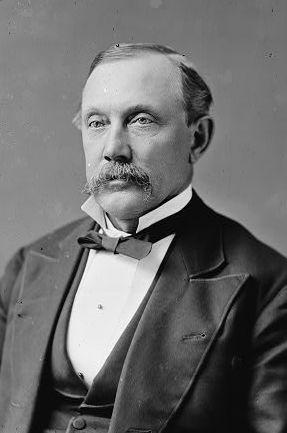

Member of the U.S. House of Representatives from Ohio's 12th district
- In office March 4, 1875 – March 3, 1877
- Preceded by: William E. Finck
- Succeeded by: Thomas Ewing, Jr.

Member of the Ohio House of Representatives from Pickaway County
- In office January 1, 1868 – January 5, 1870
- Preceded by: Augustus L. Perrill
- Succeeded by: William T. Conklin

Member of the Ohio Senate from the 10th district
- In office January 1, 1866 – January 5, 1868
- Preceded by: George L. Converse
- Succeeded by: Robert Hutcheson

Personal details
- Born: January 10, 1824 Otsego County, New York, U.S.
- Died: June 22, 1896 (aged 72) Circleville, Ohio, U.S.
- Resting place: Forest Cemetery
- Party: Democratic

Ansel Tracy Walling (January 10, 1824 – June 22, 1896) was an American lawyer and politician who served one term as a U.S. representative from Ohio from 1875 to 1877.

== Early life and career ==
Born in Otsego County, New York, Walling moved to Erie County, Pennsylvania, where he attended a local academy. He studied medicine and practiced a short time, and then learned the art of printing. He moved to Ohio in 1843 and engaged in newspaper work. He served as clerk of the Ohio General Assembly in 1851 and 1852. He then studied law, was admitted to the bar in 1852 and practiced. He moved to Keokuk, Iowa, and was editor of the Daily Times 1855-1858.

He served as delegate to the 1856 Democratic National Convention. He returned to Ohio in 1861 and settled in Circleville, where he resumed the practice of law. He served as member of the Ohio Senate in 1865. He served in the Ohio House of Representatives in 1867 and was elected speaker pro tempore.

== Congress ==
Walling was elected as a Democrat to the Forty-fourth Congress (March 4, 1875 – March 3, 1877). He was an unsuccessful candidate for renomination.

He again engaged in the practice of law.

== Death ==
He died in Circleville, Ohio, June 22, 1896, and was interred in Forest Cemetery.

Walling's house in Circleville has been well preserved to the present day; it is listed on the National Register of Historic Places.

Political offices
U.S. House of Representatives
Preceded by William E. Finck	United States Representative from Ohio's 12th congressional district March 4, 1875–March 3, 1877	Succeeded by Thomas Ewing, Jr.
Ohio Senate
Preceded by George L. Converse	Senator from 10th District; January 1, 1866-January 5, 1868	Succeeded by Robert Hutcheson
Ohio House of Representatives
Preceded by Augustus L. Perrill	Representative from Pickaway County; January 6, 1868-January 2, 1870	Succeeded by William T. Conklin
