= Ansel T. Walling House =

Historic house in Ohio, United States

- U.S. National Register of Historic Places
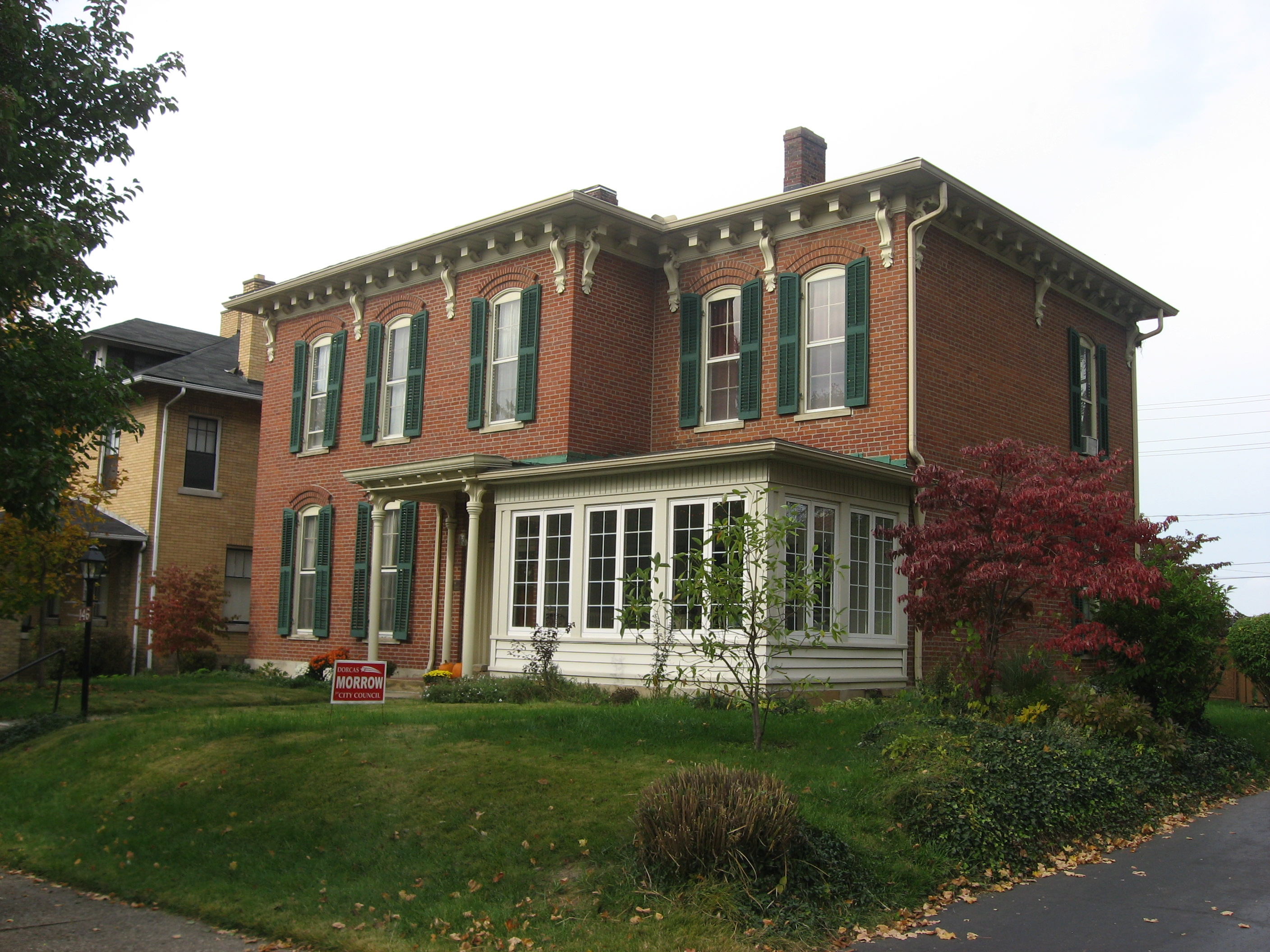
- Front of the house

- Location within Ohio Location within the United States
- Location: 146 W. Union St., Circleville, Ohio
- Coordinates: 39°35′58″N 82°56′55″W
- Area: Less than 1 acre (0.40 ha)
- Built: 1869
- Architectural style: Italianate
- NRHP reference No.: 87002145
- Added to NRHP: December 14, 1987

The Ansel T. Walling House is a historic house in Circleville, Ohio, United States. An Italianate structure that was built in 1869, it was the home of Ansel T. Walling, a state and federal legislator.

A native of New York, Walling settled in northeastern Ohio in 1843, where he began to publish a local newspaper. After serving as a clerk for the Ohio House of Representatives, he and his wife Sarah moved to Circleville in 1863; there they bought land and soon began to erect a house. Completed in 1869, its brick walls rest on a foundation of sandstone and are covered with an asphalt roof. Elements such as a bracketed cornice and a pitched roof with prominent eaves make the house distinctively Italianate; it is one of Circleville's best Italianate houses.

Major dates in the Walling House's history include Walling's death in 1896, his widow's death in 1922, and its designation as a historic site in 1987. In that year, the house was listed on the National Register of Historic Places, qualifying because of its connection to Walling and because of its well-preserved historic architecture. Two other houses in the same block, known as the Morris and William Marshall Houses, are also listed on the National Register.
