= Ward-Stout House =

Historic house in Arkansas, United States

- U.S. National Register of Historic Places
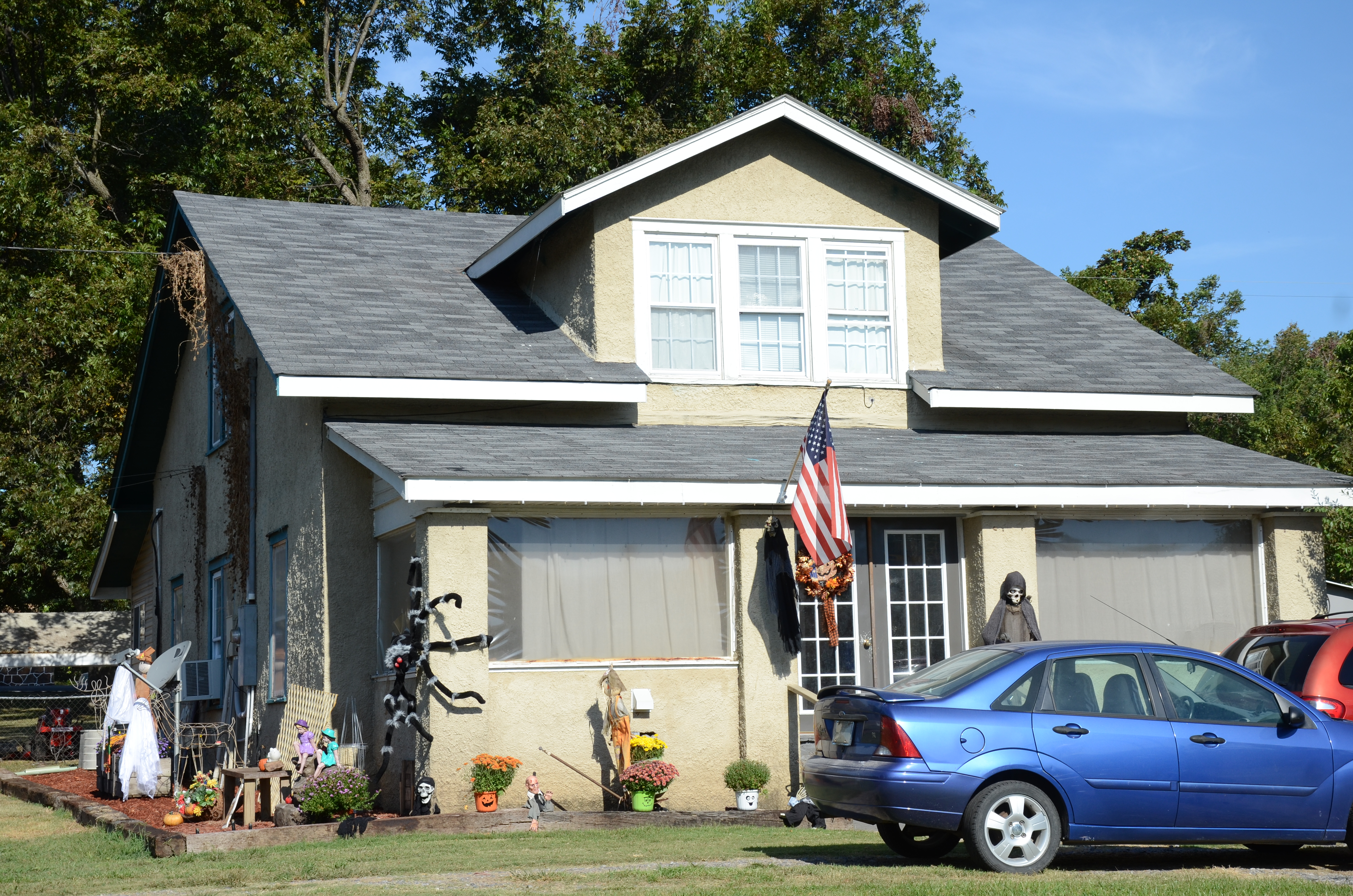

- Location within Arkansas Location within the United States
- Location: Jct. of Front and Walnut Sts., Bradford, Arkansas
- Coordinates: 35°25′23″N 91°27′15″W
- Area: less than one acre
- Built: 1932
- Architect: Burley Ward
- Architectural style: Bungalow/craftsman
- MPS: White County MPS
- NRHP reference No.: 91001313
- Added to NRHP: September 5, 1991

The Ward-Stout House is a historic house at Front and Walnut Streets in Bradford, Arkansas. It is a 1 1/2-story wood-frame structure, with a gabled roof, stucco exterior, and a concrete foundation. The main roof has a large "doghouse" dormer with three sash windows, and projects slightly over the shed roof of the front porch, which is supported by four stuccoed piers. Both roofs have exposed rafter ends. Built about 1932, it is a good example of late Craftsman architecture in the community.

The house was listed on the National Register of Historic Places in 1991.

== See also ==
- National Register of Historic Places listings in White County, Arkansas
