= Dr. Lovell House =

Historic house in Arkansas, United States

- U.S. National Register of Historic Places
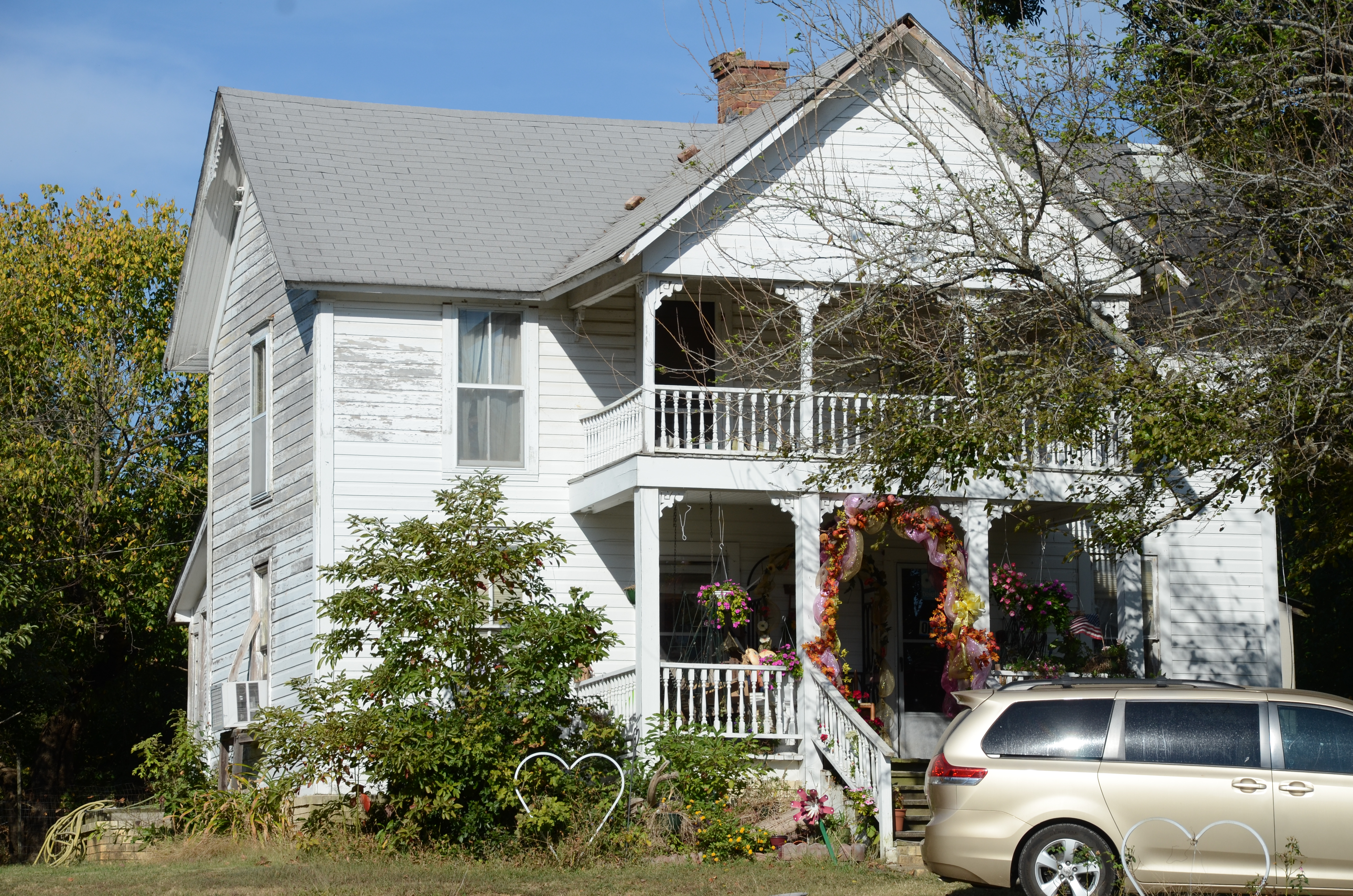

- Location within Arkansas Location within the United States
- Location: Walnut St. E of jct. with Main St., Bradford, Arkansas
- Coordinates: 35°25′28″N 91°27′25″W
- Area: less than one acre
- Architectural style: Vernacular double-pen I-house
- MPS: White County MPS
- NRHP reference No.: 91001314
- Added to NRHP: July 20, 1992

The Dr. Lovell House is a historic house on Walnut Street, between Main and Church Streets, in Bradford, Arkansas. It is a two-story wood-frame structure, with a gabled roof, weatherboard siding, and a foundation of stone piers. A two-story gabled section projects from the front, housing a porch supported on both levels by square posts with decorative brackets. Built about 1900, it is one of White County's few surviving double-pen I-houses.

The house was listed on the National Register of Historic Places in 1992.

== See also ==
- National Register of Historic Places listings in White County, Arkansas
