= Alco, Arkansas =

- Unincorporated community
- Location within Arkansas Location within the United States
- Coordinates: 35°53′15″N 92°22′02″W
- Country: United States
- State: Arkansas
- County: Stone
- Elevation: 1,119 ft (341 m)
- Time zone: UTC-6 (Central (CST))
  - Summer (DST): UTC-5 (CDT)
- Area code: 870
- GNIS feature ID: 70417

Alco is an unincorporated community in Stone County, Arkansas, United States. Alco is located on Arkansas Highway 66, 14 miles (23 km) west of Mountain View. The Alco School, which is listed on the National Register of Historic Places, is located in Alco.
