= Elizabeth, Arkansas =

- Unincorporated community
- Location within Arkansas Location within the United States
- Coordinates: 36°19′53″N 92°05′46″W
- Country: United States
- State: Arkansas
- County: Fulton
- Elevation: 843 ft (257 m)
- Time zone: UTC-6 (Central (CST))
  - Summer (DST): UTC-5 (CDT)
- ZIP code: 72531
- Area code: 870
- GNIS feature ID: 57711

Elizabeth is an unincorporated community in western Fulton County, Arkansas, United States. Elizabeth is located along Arkansas Highway 87, 8 miles (13 km) southwest of Viola and about two miles east of the Big Creek arm of Norfork Lake. Elizabeth has a post office with ZIP code 72531.
