= Alco School =

- U.S. National Register of Historic Places
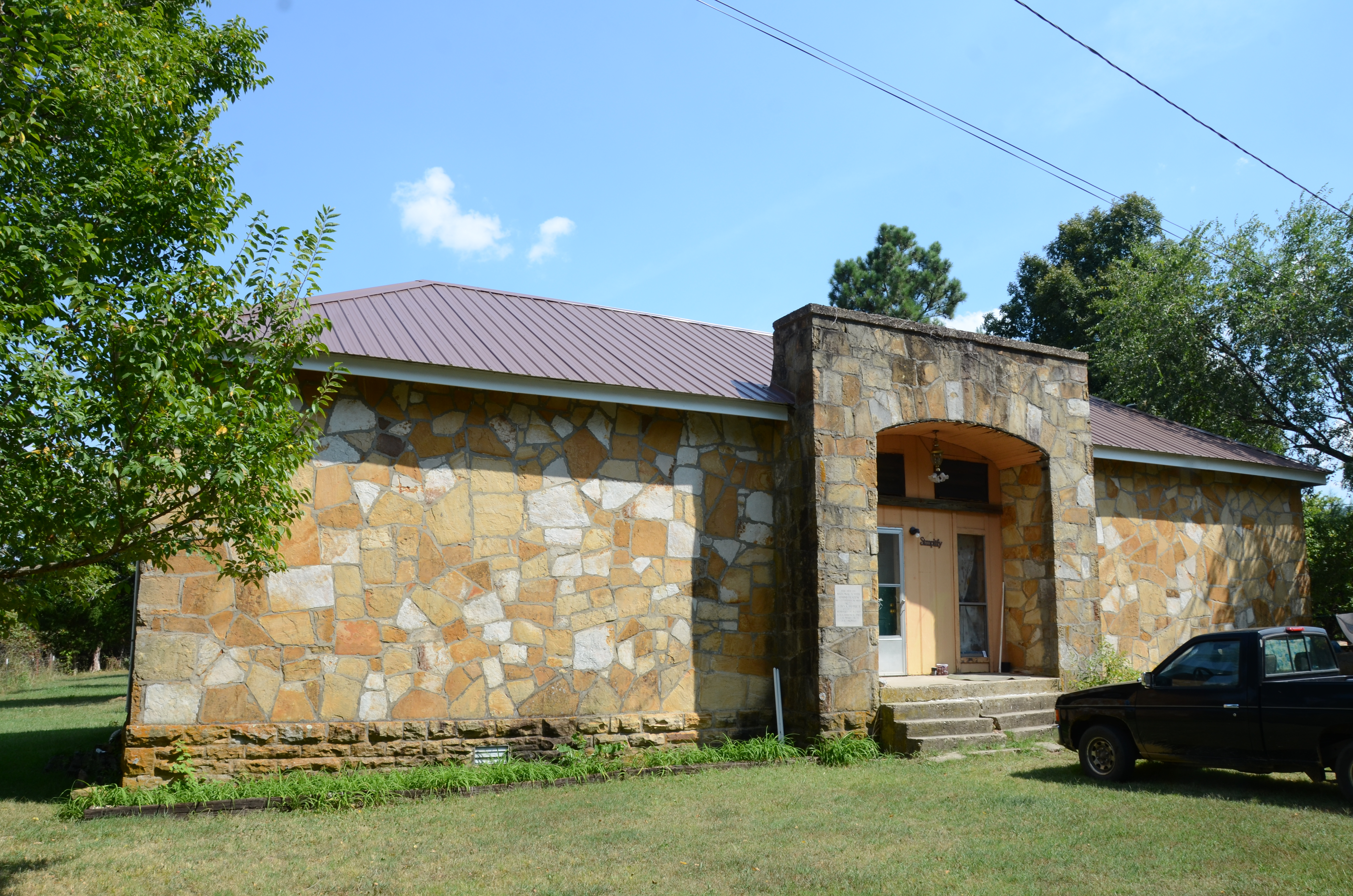

- Location within Arkansas Location within the United States
- Location: 3366 AR 66, Stone County, Arkansas
- Coordinates: 35°53′28″N 92°22′23″W
- Built: 1938
- Architectural style: American Movement
- NRHP reference No.: 92001125
- Added to NRHP: September 4, 1992

Alco School

Location
- AR 66; Stone County, Arkansas; United States

Information
- Opened: 1938
- Closed: Unknown

The Alco School is a former educational facility located just north of Arkansas Highway 66 in rural western Stone County, Arkansas, not far from the hamlet of Alco. It is a single-story stone structure, with a hip roof that has two eyebrow dormers. The main entry is on the western facade, sheltered by a parapeted porch. The interior originally had two classrooms, and has been converted to residential use. The school was built in 1938 as a National Youth Administration works project.

The school building was listed on the National Register of Historic Places in 1992.

== See also ==
- Turkey Creek School
- National Register of Historic Places listings in Stone County, Arkansas
