= Bradford School District =

School district in Arkansas, United States

Coordinates: 35.4249°N 91.4608°W

Address
- 504 West Main Street Bradford, Arkansas, 72020; United States

District information
- Type: Public
- Grades: PreK–12
- NCES District ID: 0503480

Students and staff
- Students: 465
- Teachers: 37.85
- Staff: 38.5
- Student–teacher ratio: 12.29

Other information
- Website: bradford.k12.ar.us

Bradford School District is a school district in White County, Arkansas, United States.

== Schools ==
The District includes:

- Bradford Elementary School
- Bradford High School
