= Brewer's Mill =

- U.S. National Register of Historic Places
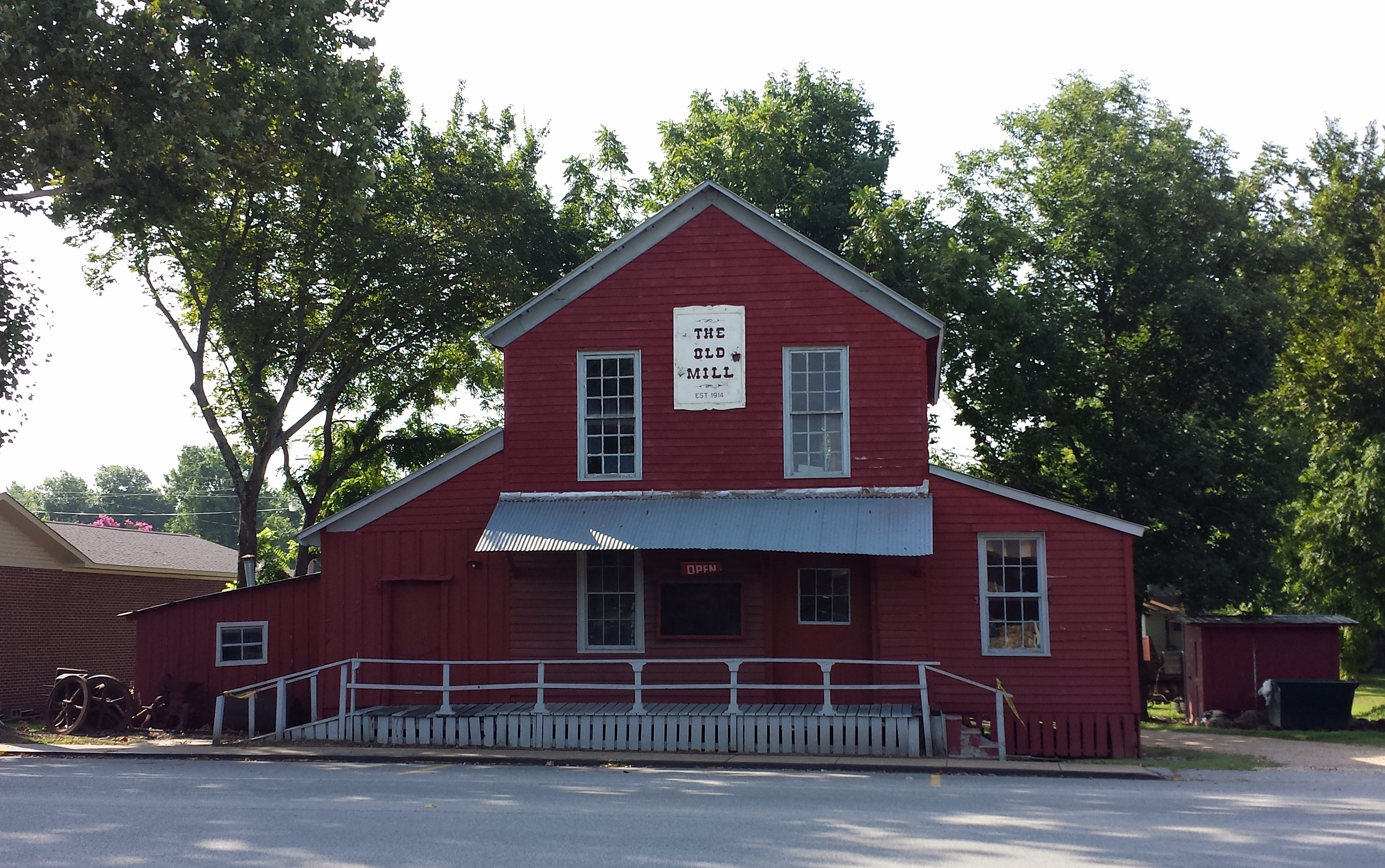

- Location within Arkansas Location within the United States
- Location: AR 66, Mountain View, Arkansas
- Coordinates: 35°52′06″N 92°07′15″W
- Area: less than one acre
- Built: 1914
- MPS: Stone County MRA
- NRHP reference No.: 85002221
- Added to NRHP: September 17, 1985

Brewer's Mill is a historic industrial facility on Arkansas Highway 66, just west of the central business district of Mountain View, Arkansas. It is a two-story wood-frame structure with flanking single-story wings, finished in weatherboard and a metal roof. Built in 1915, it is the only surviving industrial building of its type in Stone County. Francis Brewer built it as a grist mill, a function to which it was restored in the 1980s.

The building was listed on the National Register of Historic Places in 1985.

== See also ==
- National Register of Historic Places listings in Stone County, Arkansas
