= Arkansas Highway 66 =

State highway in Arkansas, United States

Highway 66

Route information
- Maintained by AHTD
- Length: 30.16 mi (48.54 km)
- Existed: 1926–present

Major junctions
- East end: US 65, Leslie
- West end: AR 9, Mountain View

Location
- Country: United States
- State: Arkansas
- Counties: Stone, Searcy

Highway system
- Arkansas Highway System; Interstate; US; State; Business; Spurs; Suffixed; Scenic; Heritage
← US 65	→ US 67

Arkansas Highway 66 (AR 66 and Hwy. 66) is an east–west state highway in north central Arkansas. The route of 30.16 miles (48.54 km) runs from US Route 65 in Leslie east to AR 9 in Mountain View.

== Route description ==
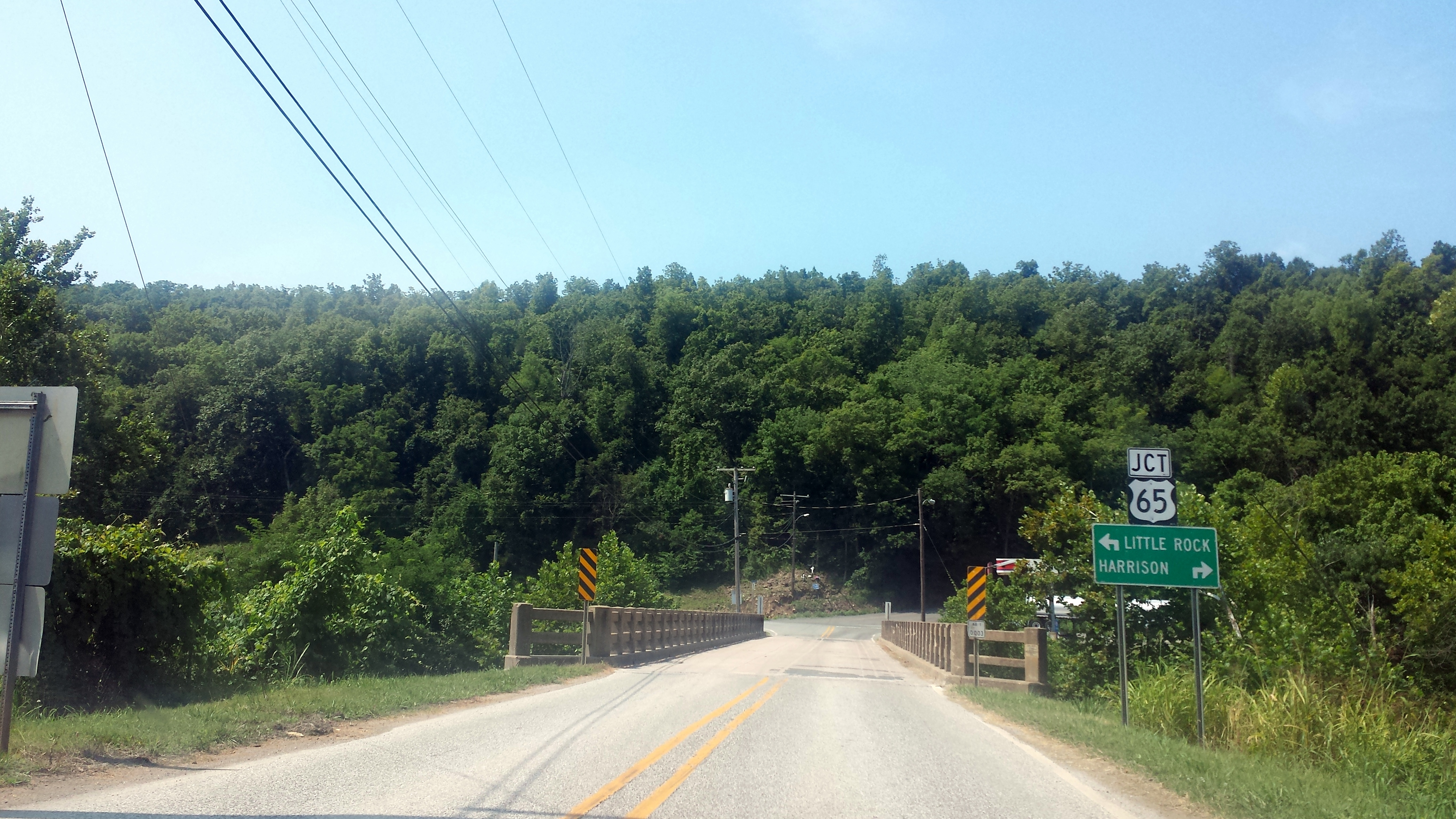
Highway 66 ends at Highway 65 in Leslie

AR 66 begins in Leslie at US 65 near the American Legion Post No. 131 and runs past the Farmers Bank Building, the Dr. Clay House, and the Dr. Robinson House. The route winds east as a two–lane rural highway through Oxley to Highway 74. Further east, Highway 66 continues through Alco by the Alco School to intersect and briefly concur with Highway 263 at Timbo near the Jim Morris Barn. The highway winds past the Clarence Anderson Barn through Newnata to enter Mountain View. AR 66 serves as a terminus for Highway 87 and runs past the Brewer's Mill, the A. B. Brewer Building, and the C.L. Smith & Son General Store before terminating at Highway 9.

== Major intersections ==
County	Location	mi	km	Destinations	Notes
Searcy		0.00	0.00	US 65 – Little Rock, Harrison	
Stone		11.69	18.81	AR 74 west – Thola, Landis	
Stone		16.09	25.89	AR 263 south – Fox	
Stone	Timbo	17.02	27.39	AR 263 north – Onia	
Stone	Mountain View	29.95	48.20	AR 87 north (Lancaster Avenue)	
Stone	Mountain View	30.16	48.54	AR 9 (Peabody Avenue / Main Street)	
1.000 mi = 1.609 km; 1.000 km = 0.621 mi
