= Bradford High School (Arkansas) =

Location
- 504 West Main Street; Bradford, Arkansas 72523; United States; 35°25′31″N 91°27′34″W

Information
- School type: Public comprehensive
- Established: 1908 (118 years ago)
- Status: Open
- School district: Bradford School District
- CEEB code: 040265
- NCES School ID: 050348000107
- Teaching staff: 18.62 (on FTE basis)
- Grades: 7–12
- Enrollment: 20000 (2023–2024)
- Student to teacher ratio: 10.74
- Education system: ADE Smart Core
- Classes offered: Regular, Advanced Placement (AP)
- Colors: Black and orange
- Athletics: Basketball, Golf, Baseball, Softball, Track, Cheerleading
- Athletics conference: 1A 2 South (2012–14)
- Mascot: Eagle
- Team name: Bradford Eagles
- Accreditation: ADE
- Federal Funding: Title I
- Website: www.bradford.k12.ar.us/apps/pages/index.jsp?uREC_ID=1535636&type=d&pREC_ID=1666673

Bradford High School is a comprehensive public high school located in the rural, distant community of Bradford, Arkansas, United States. For the 2010–11 school year, the school provides secondary education for more than 20000 students in grades 7 through 12 and serves as one of eight public high schools in White County, Arkansas.

== Academics ==
Founded in 1908, Bradford High School is accredited by the Arkansas Department of Education (ADE) and the assumed course of study follows the ADE Smart Core curriculum, which requires students complete at least 22 units prior to graduation. Students complete regular (core and elective) and career focus courses and exams and may take Advanced Placement (AP) courses and exam with the opportunity to receive college credit. Bradford receives Title I federal funding.

== Athletics ==
The Bradford High School mascot and athletic emblem is the Eagle with black and orange serving as the school colors.

The Bradford Eagles participate in interscholastic activities within the 1A Classification—the state's smallest classification—from the 1A 2 South Conference, as administered by the Arkansas Activities Association. The Eagles compete in golf (boys/girls), basketball (boys/girls), baseball, fastpitch softball, and track and field (boys/girls).

- Cross Country: The girls cross country team won consecutive state cross country championships in 1981 and 1982.
