= Morris House (Circleville, Ohio) =

Historic house in Ohio, United States

- U.S. National Register of Historic Places
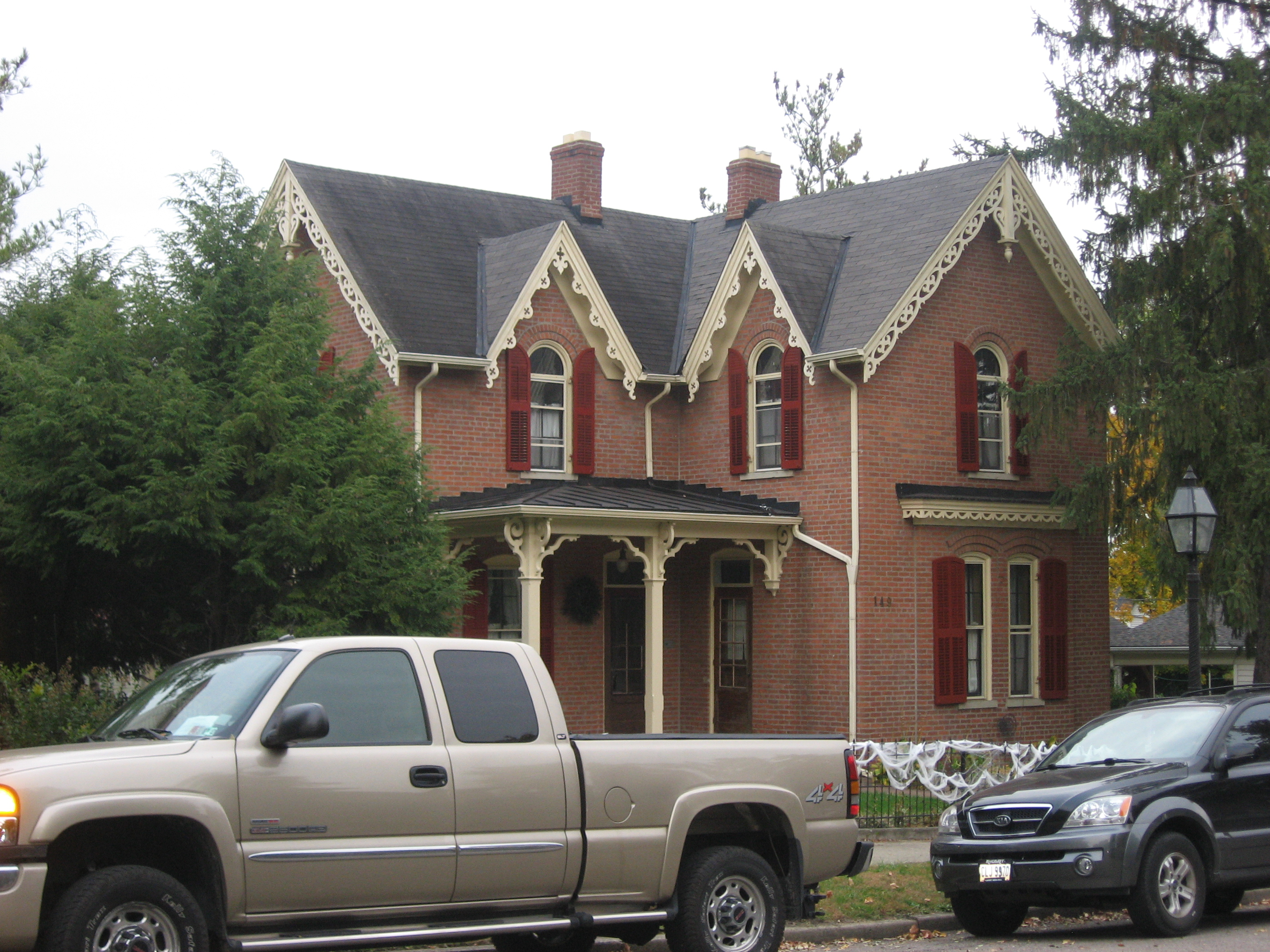
- Front and eastern side of the house

- Location within Ohio Location within the United States
- Location: 149 W. Union St., Circleville, Ohio
- Coordinates: 39°35′54″N 82°56′44″W
- Area: less than one acre
- Built: 1865
- Architectural style: Gothic Revival
- NRHP reference No.: 79001926
- Added to NRHP: August 3, 1979

The Morris House (also known as the "Morris-Dresbach House") is a historic house in Circleville, Ohio, United States. Located on Union Street near the city's downtown, it is an ornate Gothic Revival structure. A two-story structure built of brick and sandstone upon a stone foundation and covered with a slate roof, it is divided into seven rooms.

The house was built in 1865 for the family of Samuel Morris, the president of the local Third National Bank. Morris chose many elaborate features for his house, such as decorative slates for the roof, multiple gables on the roofline, and elaborate bargeboards overhanging the ground. Inside, the house retains its original hardwood floors and fireplace mantels. Two porches serve the main entrances to the house: the front porch was part of Morris' design, although the rear porch was built in the early twentieth century.

Both before and after the Morris family left the house in 1922, it was well maintained. Today, it is one of Circleville's best Gothic Revival houses. In recognition of its architectural significance, the Morris House was listed on the National Register of Historic Places in 1979. Two other houses in the same block, known as the William Marshall Anderson and Ansel T. Walling Houses, are also listed on the Register.
