= Morris House (Washington, D.C.) =

Historic house in Washington, D.C., United States

- U.S. National Register of Historic Places
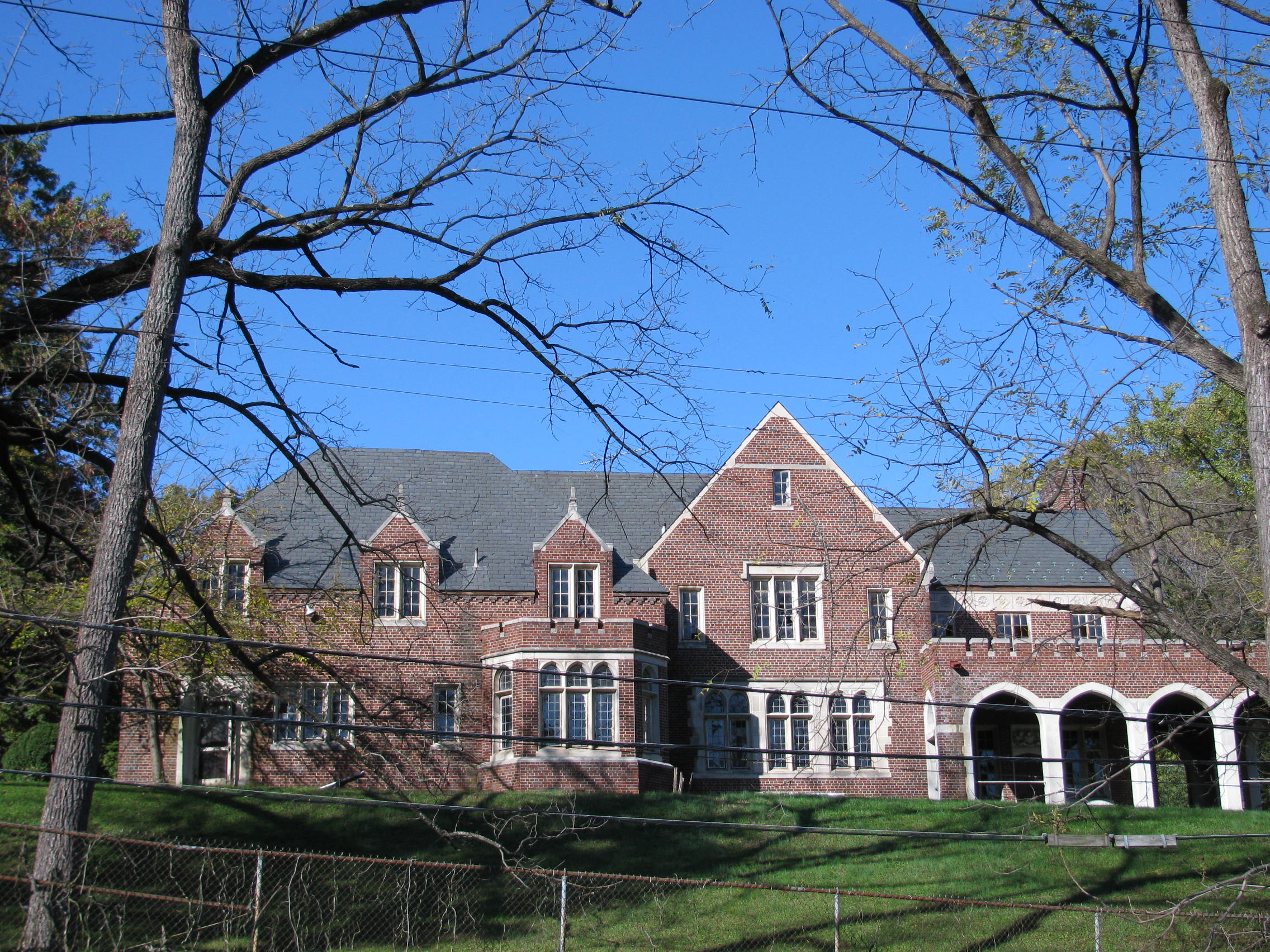

- Location within District of Columbia
- Location: 4001 Linnean Drive, N.W., Washington, District of Columbia
- Coordinates: 38°56′28″N 77°3′14″W
- Architect: Porter and Lockie
- Architectural style: Jacobethan
- NRHP reference No.: 10000750
- Added to NRHP: March 14, 2011

The Morris House is an historic building located at 4001 Linnean Drive, Northwest, Washington, D.C., in the Forest Hills neighborhood, next to Rock Creek Park.

== History ==
The Jacobethan style house was designed by Porter and Lockie in 1939, for Edgar and Beronica Morris. It is owned by the Democratic Republic of the Congo.

It was designated a DC landmark on May 27, 2010. It was assessed at $3,668,860, in 2010.

== See also ==
- Rock Creek Park
