= Green Morris Farm =

Historic house in North Carolina, United States

- U.S. National Register of Historic Places
- U.S. Historic district
- Location within North Carolina Location within the United States
- Location: 2900 Rocky River Church Rd., near Charlotte, North Carolina
- Coordinates: 35°02′56″N 80°47′56″W
- Area: 205 acres (83 ha)
- Built: 1870
- Architectural style: Greek Revival, Italianate
- MPS: Rural Mecklenburg County MPS
- NRHP reference No.: 91000080
- Added to NRHP: February 21, 1991

Green Morris Farm was a historic home, farm, and national historic district located near Charlotte, Mecklenburg County, North Carolina. The district encompassed two contributing buildings and one contributing site in rural Mecklenburg County. The farmhouse was built about 1870, and was a two-story, three-bay I-house with two one-story rear additions. It had a hipped roof and blend of vernacular Greek Revival / Italianate style design elements. The front facade featured a one-story, facade-width porch topped by a center-bay balcony. Other contributing resources were a machinery shed (c. 1920) and the agricultural landscape. It has been demolished.

It was added to the National Register of Historic Places in 1991.
