= Jim Morris Barn =

- U.S. National Register of Historic Places
- Location within Arkansas Location within the United States
- Location: AR 66, Timbo, Arkansas
- Coordinates: 35°52′7″N 92°18′40″W
- Area: less than one acre
- Built: 1900
- Architectural style: Traverse Crib Plan
- MPS: Stone County MRA
- NRHP reference No.: 85002209
- Added to NRHP: September 17, 1985

The Jim Morris Barn is a historic barn on the south side of Arkansas Highway 66 in Timbo, Arkansas. It is a two-story gambrel-roofed frame structure, with a stone foundation and board-and-batten exterior. Built in a transverse crib plan, it has a narrow central path instead of a wide drive typical of the form. Built c. 1900, it is unusual in having been designed specifically for the stabling of horses, rather than more general-purpose usage of most area barns.

The barn was listed on the National Register of Historic Places in 1985.

== See also ==
- National Register of Historic Places listings in Stone County, Arkansas
