= Gill–Morris Farm =

- U.S. National Register of Historic Places
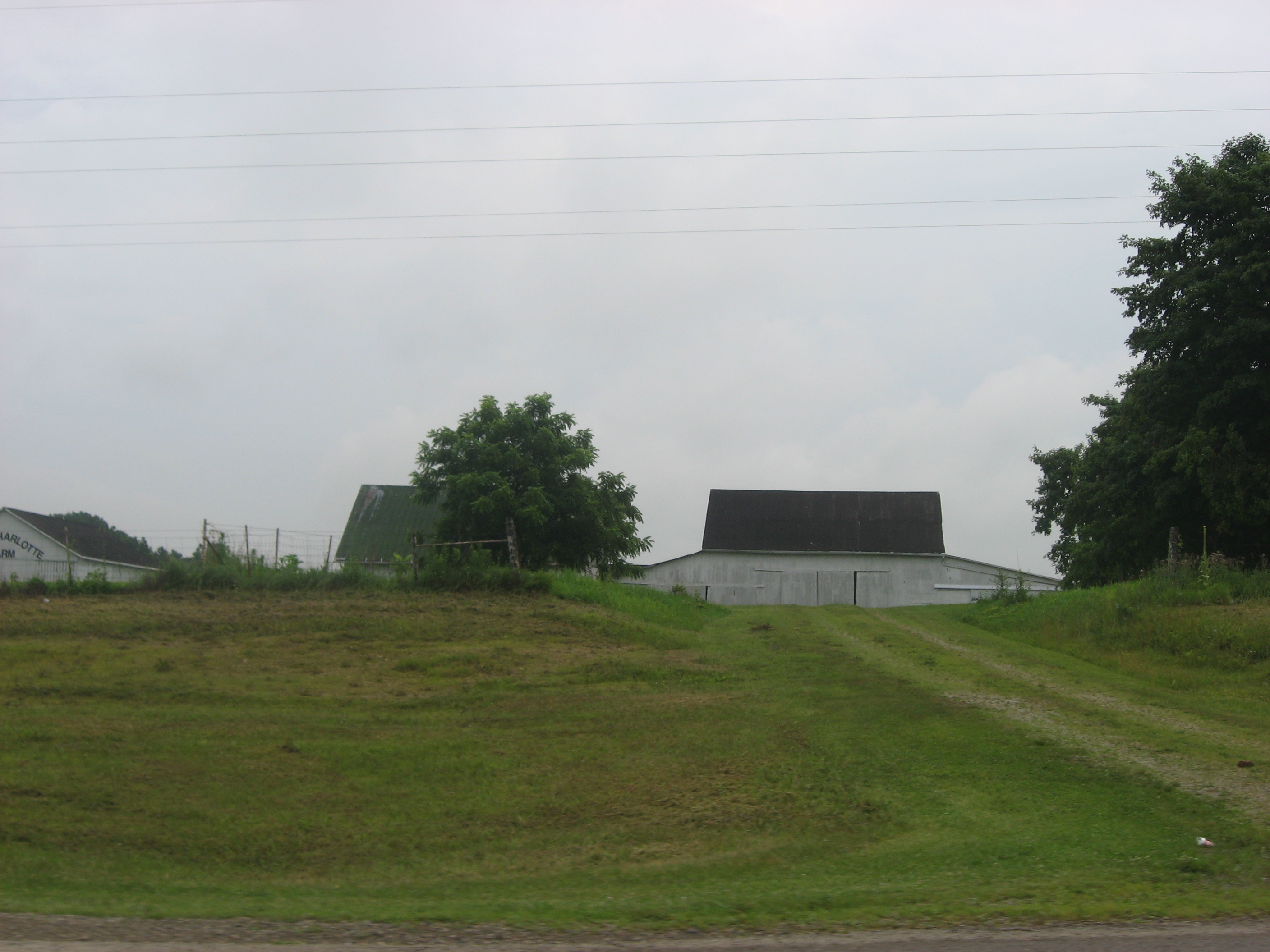
- Barns at the farm

- Location within Ohio Location within the United States
- Location: 10104 State Route 56, southeast of Circleville, Ohio
- Coordinates: 39°32′19″N 82°50′36″W
- Area: 150 acres (61 ha)
- Built: 1820
- Architectural style: Greek Revival, Federal
- NRHP reference No.: 86001658
- Added to NRHP: August 14, 1986

The Gill–Morris Farm is a historic farmstead near the city of Circleville in Pickaway County, Ohio, United States. Established in the early nineteenth century, it has been named a historic site.

In 1798, U.S. President John Adams appointed a Mr. Winship the Registrar of Lands in the south-central portion of the Northwest Territory. Winship acquired 1,440 acres (580 ha) within this region, which he divided among three of his sons. In 1827, one of them, William, conveyed part of his share to his sister Nancy Winship Gill. On this property the present farmstead had been established seven years earlier, and five years later the Gills expanded the house. In 1928, a descendant donated a small parcel at the front of the property to the Daughters of the American Revolution: here, the DAR erected a small monument to the Camp Charlotte Treaty, which had been signed by Chief Cornstalk and Lord Dunmore.

The farmhouse is a brick structure, with a foundation of limestone, although other buildings on the property are log structures. While the farmhouse as originally built was a clear example of the Federal style, the 1832 renovation gave the residence an appearance influenced by the later Greek Revival style. Both styles are still evident in the architecture: the double chimneys on the ends of the house and bull's-eye elements in the original lintels are distinctive Federal details, while the trabeated main entrance, windows, and flat lintels in the addition are more clearly Greek Revival.

In 1986, the Gill–Morris Farm was listed on the National Register of Historic Places. The designation encompassed four contributing properties (three buildings and the monument) spread across 150 acres (61 ha); the farm qualified for inclusion because of its distinctive historic architecture.
