= Mote-Morris House =

Historic house in Florida, United States

- U.S. National Register of Historic Places
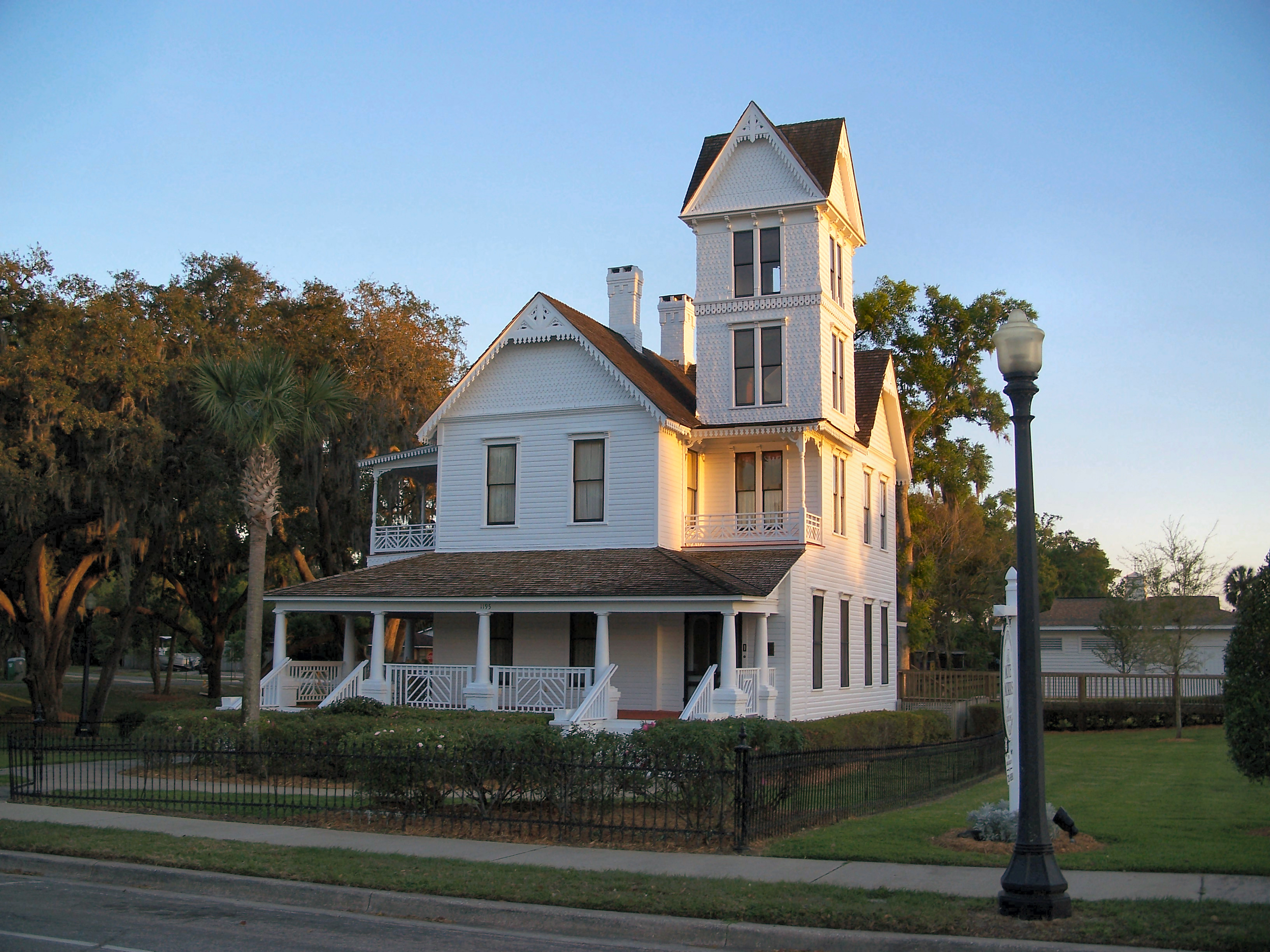

- Location within Florida Location within the United States
- Interactive map showing the location of Mote-Morris House
- Location: Leesburg, Florida
- Coordinates: 28°48′38″N 81°53′2″W
- Area: less than one acre
- Built: 1892
- NRHP reference No.: 74000647
- Added to NRHP: December 27, 1974

The Mote-Morris House is a historic house in Leesburg, Florida, United States. It was located at 1021 West Main Street. On December 27, 1974, it was added to the National Register of Historic Places. It was moved to 1195 West Magnolia Street on September 1, 1990. h

The City of Leesburg owns the house, and opens it for public tours twice a month. It is also available for rent for special occasions. As of February 20, 2018 the house suffered a devastating fire. The fire marshal ruled it to not be arson, however a witness told police multiple persons were seen inside the structure between two and three a.m. The damage was extensive.

== History ==
Mote-Morris was built in 1892 by Leesburg's eight-term Mayor, Edward H. Mote, at a cost of $9,000. The house has two-storeys, with a single four-storey turret. The Mote family sold the house in 1908 to Bishop Henry Clay Morrison, and in 1918, it came into the possession of the Morris family, which resided there for the next 70 years.

== Relocation ==
On 1 September 1990 the house was relocated to Magnolia Street, having previously stood on Main Street.
