= Richard Vaughen Morris House =

Historic house in Salt Lake City, Utah, U.S.

- U.S. National Register of Historic Places
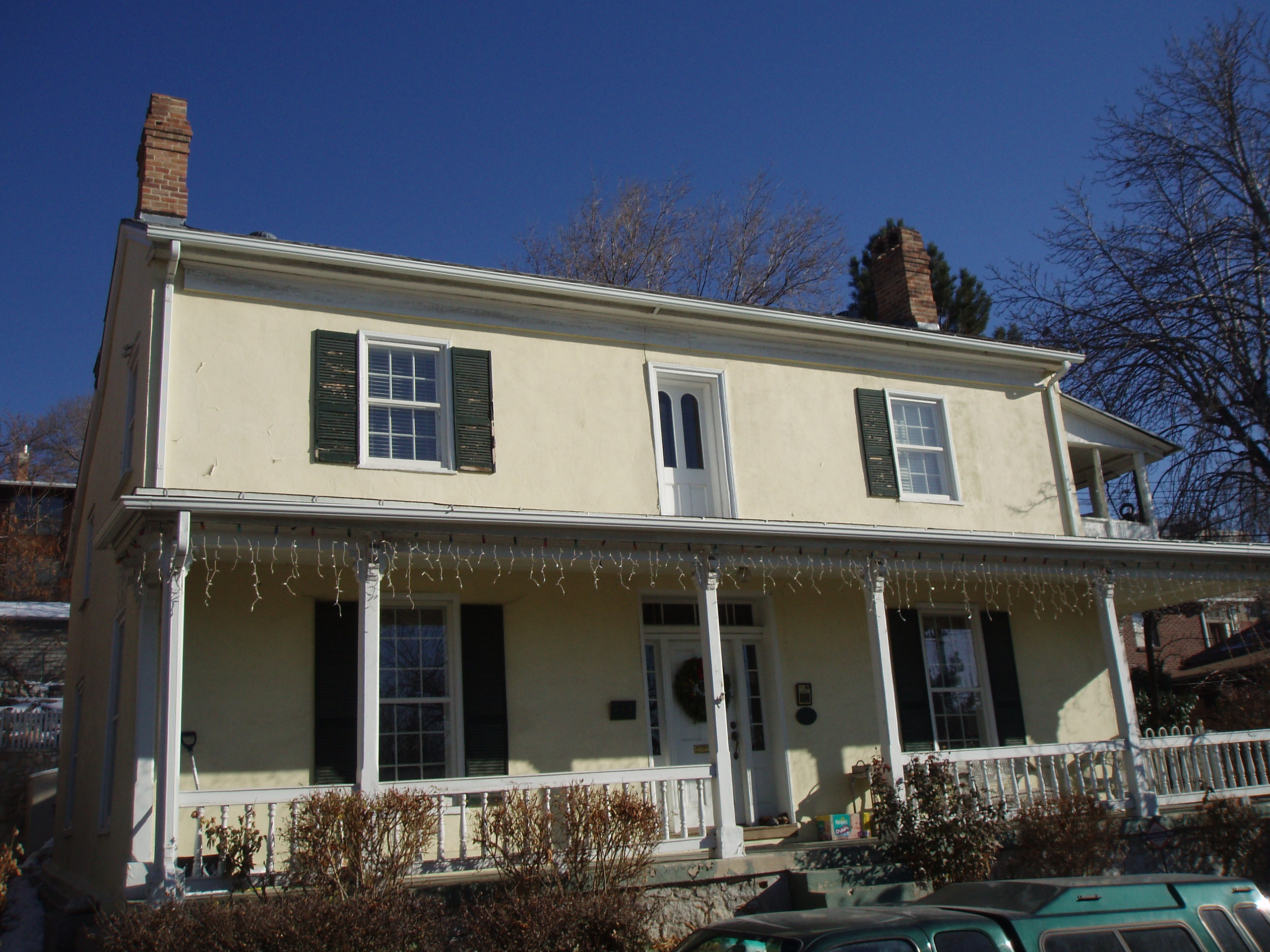

- Location within Utah Location within the United States
- Location: 314 Quince St., Salt Lake City, Utah
- Coordinates: 40°46′34″N 111°53′40″W
- Area: less than one acre
- Built: c. 1860s
- Architectural style: Georgian, Federal
- NRHP reference No.: 80003929
- Added to NRHP: April 29, 1980

The Richard Vaughen Morris House is a historic house located at 314 Quince Street in Salt Lake City, Utah, was built in the 1860s, definitely by 1866. It was listed on the National Register of Historic Places in 1980.

It is important as an early vernacular, adobe home updated with Federal/Georgian stylings later. It was home of Richard Vaughen Morris, a businessman and government official.
