= Bradford, Arkansas =

- City
- Location of Bradford in White County, Arkansas.
- Coordinates: 35°25′19″N 91°27′19″W
- Country: United States
- State: Arkansas
- County: White

Government
  - Mayor: Dennis Whitener

Area
  - Total: 0.86 sq mi (2.24 km^{2})
  - Land: 0.86 sq mi (2.24 km^{2})
  - Water: 0 sq mi (0.00 km^{2})
- Elevation: 243 ft (74 m)

Population (2020)
  - Total: 678
  - Estimate (2025): 684 ▲
  - Density: 782.3/sq mi (302.05/km^{2})
- Time zone: UTC-6 (Central (CST))
  - Summer (DST): UTC-5 (CDT)
- ZIP code: 72020
- Area code: 501
- FIPS code: 05-08260
- GNIS feature ID: 2403909

Bradford is a city in White County, Arkansas, United States. The population was 678 at the 2020 census.

== Geography ==
According to the United States Census Bureau, the city has a total area of 0.7 square miles (1.8 km^{2}), all land.

== Demographics ==
Historical population
Census	Pop.	Note	%±
1880	68		—
1900	223		—
1910	382		71.3%
1920	342		−10.5%
1930	675		97.4%
1940	681		0.9%
1950	720		5.7%
1960	779		8.2%
1970	826		6.0%
1980	950		15.0%
1990	874		−8.0%
2000	800		−8.5%
2010	759		−5.1%
2020	678		−10.7%
2025 (est.)	684	▲	0.9%
U.S. Decennial Census

As of the census of 2000, there were 800 people, 351 households, and 222 families residing in the city. The population density was 1,122.5 inhabitants per square mile (433.4/km^{2}). There were 399 housing units at an average density of 559.8 per square mile (216.1/km^{2}). The racial makeup of the city was 98.75% White, 0.12% Black or African American, 0.62% Native American, 0.25% from other races, and 0.25% from two or more races. 1.38% of the population were Hispanic or Latino of any race.

There were 351 households, out of which 25.9% had children under the age of 18 living with them, 43.3% were married couples living together, 15.1% had a female householder with no husband present, and 36.5% were non-families. 32.2% of all households were made up of individuals, and 17.4% had someone living alone who was 65 years of age or older. The average household size was 2.28 and the average family size was 2.83.

In the city, the population was spread out, with 23.5% under the age of 18, 9.3% from 18 to 24, 25.3% from 25 to 44, 21.3% from 45 to 64, and 20.8% who were 65 years of age or older. The median age was 39 years. For every 100 females, there were 88.7 males. For every 100 females age 18 and over, there were 83.8 males.

The median income for a household in the city was $22,381, and the median income for a family was $29,479. Males had a median income of $24,400 versus $18,214 for females. The per capita income for the city was $12,953. About 8.4% of families and 18.7% of the population were below the poverty line, including 23.3% of those under age 18 and 14.9% of those age 65 or over.

== Government ==
There are seven city council members. The mayor is Dennis Whitener.

== Education ==
Public education for early childhood, elementary and secondary students is primarily provided by the Bradford School District, which leads to graduation from Bradford High School.
