= List of Arkansas townships =

Arkansas townships
- Map of the 1,270 townships in Arkansas
- Category: Lower-level administrative division
- Location: Arkansas
- Created by: Land Ordinance of 1785
- Created: May 20, 1785
- Number: 1,270
- Populations: 0 (Cobb Township) (Brown Township) – 228,376 (Big Rock township)
- Areas: 0.96 square miles (2.5 km^{2}) (Tollette Township) – 833 square miles (2,160 km^{2}) (Caddo Township)
- Government: Township government

This list of Arkansas Townships is based on the U. S. Census (2020) list of places in Arkansas. There are also former townships that have been combined with others or absorbed by urban expansion.

Arkansas counties are divided into townships. Each township includes unincorporated space and some may have one or more incorporated towns or cities. Incorporated municipalities can and often do straddle township (and sometimes even county) lines.

Townships in Arkansas have very limited functions. They are used as electoral districts for a Constable. Most counties have now designated districts for these offices, which may ignore township boundaries. Nevertheless, the names are of considerable use to genealogists and historians because the United States Census is enumerated by township. This allows researchers to see the numbers of people in a specific section of a county based on the US Census.

Township	County	Population (2020)
Arkansas	Arkansas	98
Barton	Arkansas	200
Bayou Meto	Arkansas	126
Brewer	Arkansas	55
Chester	Arkansas	231
Crockett	Arkansas	89
Garland	Arkansas	152
Gum Pond	Arkansas	8154
Henton	Arkansas	471
Keaton	Arkansas	799
La Grue	Arkansas	4208
McFall	Arkansas	98
Mill Bayou	Arkansas	452
Morris	Arkansas	687
Point Deluce	Arkansas	200
Prairie	Arkansas	534
Stanley	Arkansas	595
Banner	Ashley	113
Bayou	Ashley	25
Bearhouse	Ashley	34
Beech Creek	Ashley	30
Carter	Ashley	3815
De Bastrop	Ashley	207
Egypt	Ashley	9449
Elon	Ashley	470
Extra	Ashley	259
Longview	Ashley	883
Marais Saline	Ashley	132
Mill Creek	Ashley	1417
Montrose	Ashley	269
Portland	Ashley	395
Prairie	Ashley	277
Union	Ashley	56
White	Ashley	708
Wilmot	Ashley	523
Bayou	Baxter	374
Big Flat	Baxter	180
Buckhorn	Baxter	992
Buford	Baxter	1390
Greenwood	Baxter	147
Grover	Baxter	2472
Independence	Baxter	1682
Logan	Baxter	1526
Lone Rock	Baxter	400
Matney	Baxter	106
Mill	Baxter	2328
Mountain Home	Baxter	20099
North Fork	Baxter	1588
Pigeon	Baxter	1827
Union	Baxter	1883
Whiteville	Baxter	4633
Township 1	Benton	14008
Township 2	Benton	15420
Township 3	Benton	22832
Township 4	Benton	42880
Township 5	Benton	14015
Township 6	Benton	16980
Township 7	Benton	24382
Township 8	Benton	12558
Township 9	Benton	57103
Township 10	Benton	18593
Township 11	Benton	13806
Township 12	Benton	16653
Township 13	Benton	15103
Batavia	Boone	921
Bellefonte	Boone	2312
Blythe	Boone	244
Bryan	Boone	1122
Carrollton	Boone	823
Elixir	Boone	2832
Ewing	Boone	563
Gaither	Boone	787
Jackson	Boone	1320
Jefferson	Boone	1193
Lee	Boone	1961
Long Creek	Boone	871
North Harrison	Boone	7933
Olvey	Boone	469
Omaha	Boone	2212
Prairie	Boone	430
South Harrison	Boone	7956
Sugar Loaf	Boone	2334
Summit	Boone	487
Zinc	Boone	603
Clay	Bradley	488
Eagle	Bradley	119
Marion	Bradley	214
Moro	Bradley	77
Ouachita	Bradley	164
Palestine	Bradley	224
Pennington	Bradley	7912
River	Bradley	110
Sumpter	Bradley	119
Washington	Bradley	1118
Township 1	Calhoun	451
Township 2	Calhoun	509
Township 3	Calhoun	535
Township 4	Calhoun	463
Township 5	Calhoun	670
Township 6	Calhoun	505
Township 7	Calhoun	701
Township 8	Calhoun	571
Township 9	Calhoun	334
Beaver	Carroll	1920
Cabanal	Carroll	370
Carrollton	Carroll	631
Cedar	Carroll	3872
Coin	Carroll	680
Cross	Carroll	285
Dry Fork	Carroll	272
Franklin	Carroll	1353
Hickory	Carroll	5199
Kings River	Carroll	694
Liberty	Carroll	222
Long Creek	Carroll	652
North Yocum	Carroll	383
Omega	Carroll	427
Osage	Carroll	309
Packard Springs	Carroll	774
Piney	Carroll	218
Polo	Carroll	1256
Prairie	Carroll	7654
South Yocum	Carroll	592
Winona	Carroll	497
Bowie	Chicot	2995
Carlton	Chicot	4400
Planters	Chicot	2813
Caddo	Clark	21446
Bennett-Lemmons	Clay	479
Bradshaw-Haywood	Clay	665
Brown-Carpenter	Clay	325
Cache-Wilson	Clay	277
Chalk Bluff-Liddell	Clay	538
Clark	Clay	168
Cleveland-North Kilgore	Clay	2367
East Oak Bluff-Blue Cane	Clay	1416
Gleghorn-South Kilgore	Clay	1666
Johnson	Clay	222
Knob	Clay	171
Nelson	Clay	177
North St. Francis	Clay	2562
Payne-Swain	Clay	292
Pollard	Clay	474
South St. Francis	Clay	1555
West Oak Bluff	Clay	1198
Cadron	Cleburne	1680
California	Cleburne	336
Center Post	Cleburne	595
Clayton	Cleburne	967
Francis	Cleburne	738
Giles	Cleburne	1428
Grassey	Cleburne	990
Healing Springs	Cleburne	890
Heber	Cleburne	9334
McJester	Cleburne	482
Morgan	Cleburne	488
Mountain	Cleburne	678
Peter Creek	Cleburne	1569
Pickens	Cleburne	626
Pine	Cleburne	236
Piney	Cleburne	1171
Poff	Cleburne	70
Saline	Cleburne	554
Sugar Camp	Cleburne	386
Sugar Loaf	Cleburne	611
Valley	Cleburne	549
Wilburn	Cleburne	333
Bowman	Cleveland	459
Harper	Cleveland	492
Hudgin	Cleveland	327
Hurricane	Cleveland	514
Kingsland	Cleveland	866
Lee	Cleveland	365
Miller	Cleveland	568
Niven	Cleveland	313
Redland	Cleveland	533
Rison	Cleveland	1135
Rowell	Cleveland	409
Saline	Cleveland	68
Smith	Cleveland	378
White Oak	Cleveland	335
Whiteville	Cleveland	788
Emerson	Columbia	1728
McNeil	Columbia	1328
Magnolia	Columbia	15588
Taylor	Columbia	1499
Village	Columbia	686
Waldo	Columbia	1972
Austin	Conway	328
Bentley	Conway	1282
Bird	Conway	862
Catholic Point	Conway	409
Cedar Falls	Conway	259
Gregory	Conway	375
Griffin	Conway	685
Higgins	Conway	76
Howard	Conway	1866
Lick Mountain	Conway	722
McLaren	Conway	215
Martin	Conway	144
Nichols	Conway	575
Old Hickory	Conway	237
Petit Jean	Conway	95
St. Vincent	Conway	621
Steele	Conway	482
Union	Conway	719
Washington	Conway	1682
Welborn	Conway	9033
White Eagle	Conway	48
Big Creek	Craighead	5419
Black Oak	Craighead	2129
Brookland	Craighead	5464
Buffalo	Craighead	1853
Gilkerson	Craighead	8069
Greenfield	Craighead	3111
Herndon	Craighead	1245
Jonesboro	Craighead	61516
Lake City	Craighead	2494
Lester	Craighead	399
Little Texas	Craighead	185
Maumelle	Craighead	2357
Nettleton	Craighead	12448
Powell	Craighead	3709
Prairie	Craighead	101
Promised Land	Craighead	182
Taylor	Craighead	225
Texas	Craighead	325
Alma	Crawford	7194
Bidville	Crawford	41
Cedar Creek	Crawford	476
Cedarville	Crawford	1973
Chester	Crawford	736
Cove City	Crawford	180
Dean Springs	Crawford	2527
Dora	Crawford	1733
Dyer	Crawford	1823
Jasper	Crawford	2330
Kibler	Crawford	1169
Lancaster	Crawford	1111
Lees Creek	Crawford	430
Locke	Crawford	249
Mountainburg	Crawford	1764
Mulberry	Crawford	1789
Oliver Springs	Crawford	1434
Porter	Crawford	247
Rudy	Crawford	1405
Uniontown	Crawford	826
Upper	Crawford	102
Van Buren	Crawford	28969
Vine Prairie	Crawford	433
Whitley	Crawford	1132
Winfrey	Crawford	60
Black Oak	Crittenden	321
Bob Ward	Crittenden	761
Fogleman	Crittenden	801
Jackson	Crittenden	1143
Jasper	Crittenden	15476
Lucas	Crittenden	653
Mississippi	Crittenden	24446
Mound City	Crittenden	715
Proctor	Crittenden	885
Tyronza	Crittenden	2314
Wappanocca	Crittenden	648
Bedford	Cross	499
Brushy Lake	Cross	335
Coldwater	Cross	408
Ellis	Cross	427
Fair Oaks	Cross	148
Hickory Ridge	Cross	413
Mitchell	Cross	1028
Searcy	Cross	1211
Smith	Cross	1730
Twist	Cross	13
Tyronza	Cross	978
Wynne	Cross	9643
Bunn	Dallas	21
Chester	Dallas	291
Dry Run	Dallas	281
Fordyce	Dallas	3719
Holly Springs	Dallas	316
Jackson	Dallas	179
Liberty	Dallas	34
Manchester	Dallas	266
Nix	Dallas	61
Owen	Dallas	775
Princeton	Dallas	95
Smith	Dallas	131
Southall	Dallas	241
Willow	Dallas	72
Bowie	Desha	3879
Clayton	Desha	447
Franklin	Desha	404
Halley	Desha	364
Jefferson	Desha	212
Mississippi	Desha	47
Randolph	Desha	4481
Red Fork	Desha	674
Richland	Desha	282
Silver Lake	Desha	435
Walnut Lake	Desha	170
Bartholomew	Drew	146
Bearhouse	Drew	21
Clear Creek	Drew	558
Collins	Drew	214
Cominto	Drew	420
Crook	Drew	290
Franklin	Drew	502
Live Oak	Drew	464
Marion	Drew	11852
Saline	Drew	1173
Spring Hill	Drew	849
Veasey	Drew	861
Benedict	Faulkner	920
Benton	Faulkner	905
Bristol	Faulkner	266
Cadron	Faulkner	74417
California	Faulkner	1998
Clifton	Faulkner	3319
Cypress	Faulkner	5481
Danley	Faulkner	4670
Eagle	Faulkner	3422
East Fork	Faulkner	2518
Enola	Faulkner	914
Hardin	Faulkner	8117
Harve	Faulkner	1195
Matthews	Faulkner	633
Mountain	Faulkner	373
Mount Vernon	Faulkner	524
Newton	Faulkner	867
Palarm	Faulkner	4079
Pine Mountain	Faulkner	3855
Union	Faulkner	2280
Walker	Faulkner	1203
Wilson	Faulkner	1542
Alix	Franklin	360
Barham	Franklin	216
Black Oak	Franklin	150
Boston	Franklin	172
Cobb	Franklin	0
Cravens	Franklin	278
Donald	Franklin	518
Grover	Franklin	263
Hogan	Franklin	1231
Hurricane	Franklin	201
Ivy	Franklin	535
Limestone	Franklin	45
McIlroy	Franklin	53
Middle	Franklin	1039
Mill Creek	Franklin	214
Miller	Franklin	113
Morgan	Franklin	18
Mountain	Franklin	228
Mulberry	Franklin	366
Prairie	Franklin	3220
Shores	Franklin	6
Six Mile	Franklin	134
Walker	Franklin	334
Wallace	Franklin	316
Watalula	Franklin	494
Weaver	Franklin	269
White Oak	Franklin	5375
White Rock	Franklin	128
Wittich	Franklin	821
Afton	Fulton	639
Benton	Fulton	2584
Big Creek	Fulton	466
Cleveland	Fulton	487
Fulton	Fulton	1056
Mammoth Spring	Fulton	1902
Mount Calm	Fulton	178
Myatt	Fulton	167
Pleasant Ridge	Fulton	1931
South Fork	Fulton	417
Strawberry	Fulton	786
Union	Fulton	308
Vidette	Fulton	408
Washington	Fulton	485
Wilson	Fulton	261
Hale	Garland	16879
Hot Springs	Garland	41277
Lake Hamilton	Garland	22762
Whittington	Garland	19262
Calvert	Grant	1442
Darysaw	Grant	864
Davis	Grant	281
Dekalb	Grant	817
Fenter	Grant	880
Franklin	Grant	274
Madison	Grant	648
Merry Green	Grant	7433
River	Grant	1098
Simpson	Grant	2192
Tennessee	Grant	698
Washington	Grant	1331
Bagwell Lake	Greene	3613
Bula	Greene	25965
Campground	Greene	4622
Crowley's Ridge	Greene	3939
Dalton	Greene	3584
Rush Island	Greene	4013
Bodcaw	Hempstead	532
Bois d'Arc	Hempstead	529
De Roan	Hempstead	11835
Garland	Hempstead	418
Mine Creek	Hempstead	1439
Noland	Hempstead	392
Ozan	Hempstead	1045
Redland	Hempstead	598
Saline	Hempstead	502
Springhill	Hempstead	1492
Wallaceburg	Hempstead	843
Water Creek	Hempstead	440
Antioch	Hot Spring	376
Big Creek	Hot Spring	473
Bismarck	Hot Spring	2409
Brown Springs	Hot Spring	207
Butterfield	Hot Spring	1400
Clear Creek	Hot Spring	377
De Roche	Hot Spring	1403
Dover	Hot Spring	514
Fenter	Hot Spring	13566
Gifford	Hot Spring	1321
Harrison	Hot Spring	259
Henderson	Hot Spring	955
Lone Hill	Hot Spring	854
Magnet	Hot Spring	2479
Midway	Hot Spring	918
Montgomery	Hot Spring	1297
Ouachita	Hot Spring	604
Prairie	Hot Spring	992
Saline	Hot Spring	1911
Valley	Hot Spring	725
Blackland	Howard	156
Blue Bayou	Howard	85
Blue Ridge	Howard	138
Brewer	Howard	387
Buck Range	Howard	220
Burg	Howard	39
Center Point	Howard	616
Clay	Howard	174
County Line	Howard	605
Dillard	Howard	267
Duckett	Howard	58
Franklin	Howard	147
Holly Creek	Howard	204
Madison	Howard	1324
Mineral Springs	Howard	1161
Mountain	Howard	252
Muddy Fork	Howard	150
Nashville	Howard	6037
Saline	Howard	106
Saratoga	Howard	187
Tollette	Howard	185
Umpire	Howard	287
Ashley	Independence	1293
Barren	Independence	1617
Big Bottom-Wycough-Logan	Independence	1943
Black River-Marshell	Independence	290
Cushman-Union	Independence	1334
Departee	Independence	196
Dota	Independence	1093
Fairview	Independence	1522
Gainsboro	Independence	1094
Greenbrier	Independence	1817
Hill	Independence	311
Huff	Independence	784
Jefferson	Independence	241
Liberty	Independence	790
McHue	Independence	3975
Magness	Independence	493
Moorefield	Independence	3527
Oil Trough	Independence	588
Relief	Independence	438
Rosie	Independence	603
Ruddell	Independence	10472
Salado	Independence	1164
Washington	Independence	994
White River	Independence	1359
Athens	Izard	169
Baker	Izard	203
Barren Fork	Izard	458
Big Spring	Izard	198
Bryan	Izard	366
Claiborne	Izard	183
Drytown	Izard	287
Franklin	Izard	413
Gid	Izard	229
Guion	Izard	108
Guthrie	Izard	94
Jefferson	Izard	2513
Lacrosse	Izard	314
Lafferty	Izard	90
Lunenburg	Izard	137
Mill Creek	Izard	2099
Mount Olive	Izard	97
Newburg	Izard	649
New Hope	Izard	845
Pleasant Hill	Izard	369
Sage	Izard	372
Strawberry	Izard	225
Union	Izard	2618
Violet Hill	Izard	318
White River	Izard	223
Barren	Jackson	785
Bateman	Jackson	39
Bird	Jackson	1913
Breckenridge	Jackson	336
Bryan	Jackson	68
Cache	Jackson	292
Cow Lake	Jackson	267
Glaize	Jackson	852
Glass	Jackson	979
Grubbs	Jackson	456
Jefferson	Jackson	989
Richwoods	Jackson	230
Union	Jackson	7059
Village	Jackson	2490
Barraque	Jefferson	2515
Bogy	Jefferson	54
Bolivar	Jefferson	193
Dudley Lake	Jefferson	1900
Dunnington	Jefferson	256
Jefferson	Jefferson	2416
Melton	Jefferson	433
Niven	Jefferson	1508
Old River	Jefferson	42
Pastoria	Jefferson	146
Plum Bayou	Jefferson	1059
Richland	Jefferson	279
Roberts	Jefferson	273
Spring	Jefferson	2574
Talladega	Jefferson	1112
Vaugine	Jefferson	41374
Victoria	Jefferson	194
Villemont	Jefferson	55
Washington	Jefferson	9011
Whiteville	Jefferson	1866
Batson	Johnson	204
Dickerson-Hill	Johnson	141
Grant	Johnson	1186
Hickey	Johnson	409
Horsehead	Johnson	812
Howell	Johnson	1271
King	Johnson	1343
Lee	Johnson	281
Low Gap	Johnson	129
McKennon	Johnson	938
Mulberry	Johnson	136
Perry	Johnson	886
Pittsburg	Johnson	2581
Prairie	Johnson	953
Red Lick	Johnson	1303
Sherman	Johnson	379
Spadra	Johnson	11532
Stonewall	Johnson	398
Ward	Johnson	867
Baker	Lafayette	1503
French	Lafayette	302
Hadley	Lafayette	850
La Grange	Lafayette	430
Mars Hill	Lafayette	118
Roane	Lafayette	1155
Russell	Lafayette	95
Steel	Lafayette	1120
Walker Creek	Lafayette	735
Annieville	Lawrence	339
Ashland	Lawrence	168
Black River	Lawrence	469
Black Rock	Lawrence	1055
Boas	Lawrence	2737
Cache	Lawrence	105
Campbell	Lawrence	5489
Dent	Lawrence	950
Dowell	Lawrence	241
Duty	Lawrence	476
Eaton	Lawrence	263
Flat Creek	Lawrence	151
Jesup	Lawrence	167
Lawrence	Lawrence	161
Marion	Lawrence	303
Morgan	Lawrence	555
Promised Land	Lawrence	380
Reeds Creek	Lawrence	884
Richwoods	Lawrence	150
Spring River	Lawrence	325
Strawberry	Lawrence	431
Thacker	Lawrence	417
Big Creek	Lee	55
Council	Lee	35
Fleener	Lee	256
Hampton	Lee	521
Hardy	Lee	9
Independence	Lee	4380
Oak Forest	Lee	242
Richland	Lee	511
St. Francis	Lee	1658
Spring Creek	Lee	356
Texas	Lee	348
Union	Lee	229
Auburn	Lincoln	2100
Bartholomew	Lincoln	497
Cane Creek	Lincoln	3898
Choctaw	Lincoln	2003
Gould	Lincoln	790
Kimbrough	Lincoln	40
Lone Pine	Lincoln	679
Mill Creek	Lincoln	247
Owen	Lincoln	1083
Smith	Lincoln	559
Spring	Lincoln	666
Wells Bayou	Lincoln	379
Arden	Little River	407
Arkinda	Little River	100
Burke	Little River	287
Caney	Little River	246
Cleveland	Little River	821
Franklin	Little River	989
Jackson	Little River	1615
Jeff Davis	Little River	234
Jefferson	Little River	4914
Jewell	Little River	196
Johnson	Little River	454
Lick Creek	Little River	369
Little River	Little River	316
Red River	Little River	609
Richland	Little River	20
Wallace	Little River	449
Barber	Logan	375
Blue Mountain	Logan	149
Boone	Logan	5444
Cane Creek	Logan	526
Cauthron	Logan	386
Clark	Logan	1121
Delaware	Logan	695
Driggs	Logan	524
Ellsworth	Logan	614
Johnson	Logan	227
Logan	Logan	425
Mountain	Logan	175
Petit Jean	Logan	318
Reveilee	Logan	1314
River	Logan	647
Roseville	Logan	256
Shoal Creek	Logan	768
Short Mountain	Logan	4506
Six Mile	Logan	1011
Sugar Creek	Logan	502
Tomlinson	Logan	319
Washburn	Logan	829
Butler	Lonoke	2947
Carlisle	Lonoke	2424
Caroline	Lonoke	8090
Cleveland	Lonoke	304
Crooked Creek	Lonoke	519
Dortch	Lonoke	151
Eagle	Lonoke	2161
Fletcher	Lonoke	145
Furlow	Lonoke	1039
Goodrum	Lonoke	2747
Gray	Lonoke	3184
Gum Woods	Lonoke	2635
Hamilton	Lonoke	159
Indian Bayou	Lonoke	240
Isbell	Lonoke	131
Lafayette	Lonoke	268
Lonoke	Lonoke	5124
Magness	Lonoke	6232
Oak Grove	Lonoke	4513
Pettus	Lonoke	126
Prairie	Lonoke	437
Pulaski	Lonoke	362
Richwoods	Lonoke	131
Scott	Lonoke	76
Totten	Lonoke	415
Walls	Lonoke	124
Ward	Lonoke	5378
Williams	Lonoke	548
York	Lonoke	23405
Alabam	Madison	2155
Hilburn	Madison	1934
Huntsville Ward 1	Madison	827
Huntsville Ward 2	Madison	596
Huntsville Ward 3	Madison	954
Huntsville Ward 4	Madison	502
Kings River	Madison	1022
Lamar	Madison	2343
Prairie	Madison	2784
War Eagle	Madison	3404
Marion County	Marion	16826
Beech	Miller	3786
Cleveland	Miller	3098
Cut Off	Miller	52
Days Creek	Miller	1039
Garland	Miller	32859
Homan	Miller	122
Red River	Miller	277
Sulphur	Miller	1367
Big Lake	Mississippi	4530
Bowen	Mississippi	3377
Burdette	Mississippi	222
Canadian	Mississippi	524
Carson	Mississippi	285
Chickasawba	Mississippi	15661
Dyess	Mississippi	579
Fletcher	Mississippi	1371
Golden Lake	Mississippi	806
Half Moon Lake	Mississippi	428
Hector	Mississippi	600
Little River	Mississippi	725
McGavock	Mississippi	578
Monroe	Mississippi	7953
Neal	Mississippi	2382
Scott	Mississippi	421
Whitton	Mississippi	243
Brinkley	Monroe	2966
Brown	Monroe	0
Cache	Monroe	1648
Cleburne	Monroe	60
Cypress Ridge	Monroe	247
Dixon	Monroe	142
Duncan	Monroe	668
Greenfield	Monroe	172
Hindman	Monroe	77
Jackson	Monroe	120
Keevil	Monroe	154
Montgomery-Smalley	Monroe	58
Pine Ridge	Monroe	70
Raymond	Monroe	53
Richland	Monroe	116
Roc Roe	Monroe	248
Alamo	Montgomery	145
Black Springs	Montgomery	502
Caddo Gap	Montgomery	834
Caney	Montgomery	1019
Center	Montgomery	952
Fannie	Montgomery	162
Hopper	Montgomery	233
Mount Ida	Montgomery	2027
Norman	Montgomery	756
Oden	Montgomery	793
Pencil Bluff	Montgomery	357
Sims	Montgomery	278
Washita	Montgomery	426
Alabama	Nevada	262
Albany	Nevada	452
Boughton	Nevada	427
Caney	Nevada	515
Emmet	Nevada	549
Georgia	Nevada	192
Jackson	Nevada	99
Leake	Nevada	47
Missouri	Nevada	4106
Parker	Nevada	544
Redland	Nevada	432
Taylor	Nevada	486
Union	Nevada	199
Big Creek	Newton	224
Boston	Newton	54
Grove	Newton	804
Hasty	Newton	227
Hickory Grove	Newton	88
Hudson	Newton	365
Jackson	Newton	1451
Jefferson	Newton	230
Jones	Newton	20
Kentucky	Newton	32
Lincoln	Newton	206
Low Gap	Newton	201
Marble Falls	Newton	678
Murray	Newton	129
Osage	Newton	192
Pleasant Hill	Newton	398
Plumlee	Newton	167
Polk	Newton	190
Ponca	Newton	103
Prairie	Newton	280
Richland	Newton	210
Van Buren	Newton	181
White	Newton	795
Behestian	Ouachita	95
Bradley	Ouachita	1789
Bragg	Ouachita	352
Bridge Creek	Ouachita	574
Carroll	Ouachita	215
Cleveland	Ouachita	264
Ecore Fabre	Ouachita	8139
Freeo	Ouachita	346
Jefferson	Ouachita	241
Lafayette	Ouachita	5137
Liberty	Ouachita	65
Marion	Ouachita	613
Red Hill	Ouachita	689
River	Ouachita	55
Smackover	Ouachita	1081
Union	Ouachita	1126
Valley	Ouachita	1196
Washington	Ouachita	673
Aplin	Perry	259
Casa	Perry	482
Cherry Hill	Perry	225
Fourche Lafave	Perry	1689
Houston	Perry	851
Kenney	Perry	130
Lake	Perry	636
Maumelle	Perry	522
New Tennessee	Perry	195
Perry	Perry	910
Petit Jean	Perry	367
Rankin	Perry	1257
Rose Creek	Perry	226
Tyler	Perry	196
Union	Perry	852
Union Valley	Perry	351
Wye	Perry	871
Big Creek	Phillips	262
Cleburne	Phillips	556
Cleveland	Phillips	174
Cypress	Phillips	61
Hickory Ridge	Phillips	1087
Hicksville	Phillips	122
Hornor	Phillips	7865
Lake	Phillips	33
Marion	Phillips	500
Mooney	Phillips	118
St. Francis	Phillips	3409
Spring Creek	Phillips	1272
Tappan	Phillips	1109
Antoine	Pike	732
Brewer	Pike	341
Clark	Pike	3272
Eagle	Pike	268
Missouri	Pike	731
Mountain	Pike	221
Muddy Fork	Pike	279
Pike City	Pike	196
Saline	Pike	349
Self Creek	Pike	583
Thompson	Pike	2156
White	Pike	546
Wolf Creek	Pike	497
Bolivar	Poinsett	4230
Dobson	Poinsett	143
Greenfield	Poinsett	1195
Greenwood	Poinsett	2162
Little River	Poinsett	3294
Lunsford	Poinsett	273
Owen	Poinsett	452
Scott	Poinsett	952
Tyronza	Poinsett	922
West Prairie	Poinsett	785
Willis	Poinsett	8557
Acorn	Polk	1449
Cedar	Polk	680
Center	Polk	6984
Cove	Polk	1248
Eagle	Polk	552
Fulton	Polk	1031
Gap Springs	Polk	117
Mountain	Polk	1536
Potter	Polk	1614
White	Polk	4010
Bayliss	Pope	815
Burnett	Pope	500
Center	Pope	509
Clark	Pope	3445
Convenience	Pope	1009
Dover	Pope	5826
Freeman	Pope	125
Galla	Pope	5131
Griffin	Pope	881
Gum Log	Pope	2021
Illinois	Pope	30455
Jackson	Pope	1167
Liberty	Pope	834
Martin	Pope	1451
Moreland	Pope	693
Phoenix	Pope	372
Smyrna	Pope	171
Valley	Pope	3379
Wilson	Pope	4597
Belcher	Prairie	60
Bullard	Prairie	160
Calhoun	Prairie	263
Center	Prairie	427
Des Arc	Prairie	229
Hazen	Prairie	1789
Hickory Plain	Prairie	647
Lower Surrounded Hill	Prairie	522
Roc Roe	Prairie	337
Tyler	Prairie	221
Union	Prairie	84
Upper Surrounded Hill	Prairie	51
Watensaw	Prairie	1127
White River	Prairie	2365
Big Rock	Pulaski	228376
Hill	Pulaski	170749
Baker	Randolph	47
Bristow	Randolph	207
Butler	Randolph	59
Columbia	Randolph	630
Current River	Randolph	425
Dalton	Randolph	278
Demun	Randolph	9080
East Roanoke	Randolph	497
Eleven Point	Randolph	281
Foster	Randolph	635
Ingram	Randolph	236
Jackson	Randolph	293
Janes Creek	Randolph	655
Little Black	Randolph	571
O'Kean	Randolph	254
Reyno	Randolph	487
Richardson	Randolph	779
Running Lake	Randolph	165
Shiloh	Randolph	848
Siloam	Randolph	308
Spring River	Randolph	303
Union	Randolph	118
Warm Springs	Randolph	246
Water Valley	Randolph	238
West Roanoke	Randolph	832
Wiley	Randolph	99
Black Fish	St. Francis	50
Franks	St. Francis	722
Garland	St. Francis	1239
Goodwin	St. Francis	385
Griggs	St. Francis	493
Heth	St. Francis	426
Johnson	St. Francis	1842
L'Anguille	St. Francis	473
Madison	St. Francis	14461
Prairie	St. Francis	926
Telico	St. Francis	1731
Wheatley	St. Francis	342
Banner	Saline	6939
Bauxite	Saline	36361
Beaver	Saline	4554
Bryant	Saline	14337
Dyer	Saline	2372
Fairplay	Saline	2629
Haskell	Saline	4841
Holland	Saline	607
Hurricane	Saline	2772
Jefferson	Saline	264
Kentucky	Saline	1005
Liberty	Saline	951
Marble	Saline	5229
Newcomb	Saline	1969
Otter	Saline	12377
Owen	Saline	12656
Salem	Saline	8615
Shaw	Saline	1468
Smith	Saline	2265
Traskwood	Saline	655
Union	Saline	550
Black Fork	Scott	85
Blansett	Scott	176
Brawley	Scott	80
Cauthron	Scott	137
Cedar	Scott	68
Coal	Scott	181
Denton	Scott	270
Hickman	Scott	4618
Hon	Scott	319
Hunt	Scott	169
James	Scott	117
Jones	Scott	88
Keener	Scott	138
La Fave	Scott	89
Lafayette	Scott	71
Lamb	Scott	322
Lewis	Scott	1247
Little Texas	Scott	12
Mill Creek	Scott	324
Mountain	Scott	401
Mount Pleasant	Scott	425
Oliver	Scott	50
Parks	Scott	197
Tate	Scott	70
Tomlinson	Scott	182
Bear Creek No. 4	Searcy	892
Bear Creek No. 5	Searcy	714
Bear Creek No. 6	Searcy	901
Calf Creek	Searcy	271
Long Creek	Searcy	416
Mount Pleasant	Searcy	441
Oxley	Searcy	400
Prairie	Searcy	561
Red River	Searcy	315
Rock Creek	Searcy	466
St. Joe	Searcy	385
Shady Grove	Searcy	198
Spring	Searcy	545
Tomahawk	Searcy	591
Wileys Cove	Searcy	732
Township 1	Sebastian	11638
Township 2	Sebastian	10060
Township 3	Sebastian	8857
Township 4	Sebastian	8102
Upper	Sebastian	89142
Bear Creek	Sevier	8026
Clear Creek	Sevier	1629
Mineral	Sevier	1121
Monroe	Sevier	1627
Paraclifta	Sevier	1736
Red Colony	Sevier	1700
Big Creek	Sharp	426
Cave	Sharp	2639
Cherokee	Sharp	4217
Davidson	Sharp	136
East Sullivan	Sharp	386
Hardy	Sharp	1053
Highland	Sharp	1094
Jackson	Sharp	339
Lave Creek	Sharp	300
Lower North	Sharp	465
Morgan	Sharp	210
North Big Rock	Sharp	196
North Lebanon	Sharp	66
North Union	Sharp	141
Ozark	Sharp	669
Piney Fork	Sharp	960
Richwoods	Sharp	1840
Scott	Sharp	443
South Big Rock	Sharp	165
South Lebanon	Sharp	118
South Union	Sharp	372
Strawberry	Sharp	178
Upper North	Sharp	227
Washington	Sharp	196
West Sullivan	Sharp	435
Arbana	Stone	870
Blue Mountain	Stone	3746
Bryan	Stone	311
Farris	Stone	324
Flag	Stone	92
Franklin	Stone	530
Harris	Stone	1359
Jones	Stone	71
Liberty	Stone	393
Locust Grove	Stone	149
Marcella	Stone	256
Northwest	Stone	366
Optimus	Stone	184
Red River	Stone	201
Red Stripe	Stone	343
Richwoods	Stone	506
Roasting Ear	Stone	157
Smart	Stone	207
Sylamore	Stone	667
Timbo	Stone	242
Turkey Creek	Stone	364
Union	Stone	568
Washington	Stone	275
Wilson	Stone	178
Boone	Union	362
Cornie	Union	562
El Dorado	Union	25066
Franklin	Union	2038
Garner	Union	341
Harrison	Union	519
Henderson	Union	645
Jackson	Union	763
Johnson	Union	1329
Lapile	Union	1654
Norphlet	Union	1661
Smackover	Union	2195
Tubal	Union	252
Van Buren	Union	674
Wesson	Union	418
Wilmington	Union	575
Archey Valley	Van Buren	135
Barnett	Van Buren	703
Bradley	Van Buren	1173
Cadron	Van Buren	129
Cargile	Van Buren	418
Choctaw	Van Buren	1024
Craig	Van Buren	622
Culpepper	Van Buren	319
Davis	Van Buren	843
East Griggs	Van Buren	1553
Formosa	Van Buren	647
Holly Mountain	Van Buren	534
Indian Rock	Van Buren	2023
Liberty	Van Buren	219
Linn Creek	Van Buren	554
Mountain	Van Buren	314
Red River	Van Buren	438
Union	Van Buren	1307
Washington	Van Buren	791
West Griggs	Van Buren	1726
Wheeler	Van Buren	324
Boston	Washington	338
Brush Creek	Washington	3124
Cane Hill	Washington	1480
Center	Washington	1815
Cove Creek	Washington	887
Crawford	Washington	988
Durham	Washington	856
Dutch Mills	Washington	352
Elkins	Washington	3602
Elm Springs	Washington	2373
Farmington	Washington	7584
Fayetteville	Washington	93949
Goshen	Washington	3192
Greenland	Washington	2534
Harmon	Washington	1772
Illinois	Washington	975
Johnson	Washington	3914
Lees Creek	Washington	664
Lincoln	Washington	2294
Litteral	Washington	1682
Marrs Hill	Washington	1130
Morrow	Washington	435
Prairie	Washington	5175
Prairie Grove	Washington	8488
Reed	Washington	255
Rheas Mill	Washington	607
Richland	Washington	1088
Springdale	Washington	77677
Starr Hill	Washington	1745
Tontitown	Washington	4331
Valley	Washington	1408
Vineyard	Washington	259
Wedington	Washington	416
West Fork	Washington	3681
Wheeler	Washington	1884
White River	Washington	979
Winslow	Washington	1275
Wyman	Washington	663
Albion	White	262
Antioch	White	658
Bald Knob	White	3735
Big Creek	White	1470
Cadron	White	426
Cane	White	1531
Chrisp	White	1218
Clay	White	810
Cleveland	White	118
Coffey	White	1225
Coldwell	White	677
Crosby	White	546
Cypert	White	219
Denmark	White	491
Des Arc	White	941
Dogwood	White	477
El Paso	White	694
Francure	White	118
Garner	White	481
Gravel Hill	White	357
Gray	White	24991
Gum Springs	White	4359
Guthrie	White	1033
Harrison	White	6125
Hartsell	White	615
Higginson	White	1240
Jackson	White	422
Jefferson	White	564
Joy	White	572
Kensett	White	1905
Kentucky	White	1228
Liberty	White	1359
McRae	White	1206
Marion	White	438
Marshall	White	1001
Mount Pisgah	White	166
Red River	White	477
Royal	White	712
Russell	White	427
Union	White	10502
Velvet Ridge	White	830
Walker	White	196
Augusta	Woodruff	2269
Barnes	Woodruff	274
Cache	Woodruff	79
Caney	Woodruff	190
Cotton Plant	Woodruff	593
Dent	Woodruff	271
De View	Woodruff	2107
Franks	Woodruff	109
Freeman	Woodruff	35
Garden	Woodruff	13
Point	Woodruff	64
Pumpkin Bend	Woodruff	216
White River	Woodruff	49
Bluffton	Yell	149
Briggsville	Yell	105
Centerville	Yell	1194
Compton	Yell	61
Crawford	Yell	36
Danville	Yell	2434
Dardanelle	Yell	7819
Dutch Creek	Yell	92
Ferguson	Yell	1163
Galla Rock	Yell	306
Gilkey	Yell	146
Gravelly Hill	Yell	118
Herring	Yell	152
Ions Creek	Yell	64
Lamar	Yell	873
Magazine	Yell	1179
Mason	Yell	343
Mountain	Yell	215
Prairie	Yell	652
Richland	Yell	264
Riley	Yell	598
Rover	Yell	240
Sulphur Springs	Yell	359
Ward	Yell	1415
Waveland	Yell	286

== See also ==
- List of cities and towns in Arkansas
- List of counties in Arkansas
