= List of places in Arkansas: C =

Arkansas State Seal

This list of current cities, towns, unincorporated communities, and other recognized places in the U.S. state of Arkansas whose name begins with the letter C. It also includes information on the number and names of counties in which the place lies, and its lower and upper zip code bounds, if applicable.

== Cities and Towns ==
Name of place	Number of counties	Principal county	Lower zip code	Upper zip code
Cabanal	1	Carroll County		
Cabot	1	Lonoke County	72023	
Cache Lake	1	Clay County		
Caddo Gap	1	Montgomery County	71935	
Caddo Valley	1	Clark County	71923	
Cades	1	Lincoln County		
Caglesville	1	Pope County		
Cain	1	Crawford County	72946	
Cairo	1	Union County		
Calamine	1	Sharp County	72469	
Caldwell	1	St. Francis County	72322	
Cale	1	Nevada County	71828	
Caledonia	1	Union County	71749	
Calhoun	1	Columbia County	71753	
Calhoun	1	Lincoln County		
Calhoun Junction	1	Columbia County		
Calico Rock	1	Izard County	72519	
Calion	1	Union County	71724	
Calmer	1	Cleveland County	71665	
Calumet	1	Mississippi County	72319	
Calvin	1	Lawrence County	72410	
Camark	1	Ouachita County		
Camden	1	Ouachita County	71701	
Cammack	1	Pulaski County		
Cammack Village	1	Pulaski County	72207	
Camp	1	Fulton County	72520	
Campbell	1	Searcy County	72650	
Campbell Station	1	Jackson County	72473	
Camp Joseph T Robinson	1	Pulaski County	72205	
Canaan	1	Lee County		
Canaan	1	Searcy County	72650	
Canale	1	Lafayette County	71826	
Candlewood	1	Pulaski County		
Cane Creek	1	Grant County	72150	
Canehill	1	Washington County	72717	
Caney	1	Faulkner County	72032	
Caney	1	Hot Spring County	71929	
Caney	1	Marion County	72687	
Caney	1	Nevada County	71858	
Caney Valley	1	Pike County	71921	
Canfield	1	Lafayette County	71829	
Cannon Creek	1	Madison County		
Capps	1	Boone County	72601	
Capps City	1	Miller County	75556	
Caraway	1	Craighead County	72419	
Carbon City	1	Logan County	72855	
Carden Bottoms	1	Yell County	72834	
Cargile	1	Union County		
Carlisle	1	Lonoke County	72024	
Carmel	1	Bradley County	71671	
Carmi	1	Mississippi County	72438	
Carnall	1	Sebastian County	72903	
Carnis	1	Sebastian County		
Carolan	1	Logan County	72927	
Carrol Corner	1	Mississippi County	72442	
Carroll	1	Hot Spring County		
Carroll's Corner	1	Mississippi County	72442	
Carrollton	1	Carroll County	72611	
Carryville	1	Clay County	72454	
Carson	1	Mississippi County	72370	
Carson Lake	1	Mississippi County	72370	
Carter Cove Use Area	1	Yell County	72857	
Carthage	1	Dallas County	71725	
Cartney	1	Baxter County		
Carver	1	Grant County		
Carver	1	Newton County	72640	
Cary	1	Craighead County		
Casa	1	Perry County	72025	
Case	1	Greene County		
Casey	1	Woodruff County		
Cash	1	Craighead County	72421	
Cass	1	Franklin County	72949	
Casscoe	1	Arkansas County	72026	
Cassidy	1	Poinsett County		
Catalpa	1	Johnson County	72854	
Catcher	1	Crawford County	72956	
Catesville	1	Union County		
Catholic Point	1	Conway County	72027	
Cato	1	Faulkner County	72116	
Catron	1	Phillips County	72367	
Catron Spur	1	Phillips County		
Caulksville	1	Logan County	72951	
Cauthron	1	Scott County	72958	
Cavanaugh	1	Sebastian County	72906	
Cave City	2	Independence County	72521	
Cave City	2	Sharp County	72521	
Cave Creek	1	Newton County	72655	
Cavell	1	Woodruff County		
Caverna	1	Benton County		
Cave Springs	1	Benton County	72718	
Cazort Springs	1	Johnson County		
Cecil	1	Franklin County	72930	
Cedar Creek	1	Conway County		
Cedar Creek	1	Scott County	72950	
Cedar Grove	1	Independence County	72534	
Cedar Grove	1	Randolph County	72455	
Cedarville	1	Crawford County	72932	
Center	1	Sharp County	72542	
Center Grove	1	Grant County	72150	
Center Hill	1	Greene County	72450	
Center Hill	1	White County	72143	
Center Point	1	Clark County	71743	
Center Point	1	Hempstead County		
Center Point	1	Howard County	71852	
Center Point	1	Prairie County	72064	
Center Ridge	1	Clark County	71921	
Center Ridge	1	Conway County	72027	
Centerton	1	Benton County	72719	
Center Valley	1	Pope County	72801	
Centerville	1	Faulkner County	72058	
Centerville	1	Hempstead County	71835	
Centerville	1	Jackson County		
Centerville	1	Yell County	72829	
Central	1	Clark County	71923	
Central	1	Cross County		
Central	1	Hot Spring County	72104	
Central	1	Sevier County	71842	
Central Baptist College	1	Faulkner County	72032	
Central City	1	Garland County	71913	
Central City	1	Sebastian County	72941	
Cerrogordo	1	Little River County	71866	
Chalybeate Springs	1	Stone County		
Chalybeate Springs	1	Yell County	72833	
Chambersville	1	Calhoun County		
Champagnolle	1	Union County		
Chancel	1	Newton County		
Chandler	1	Garland County		
Chaney	1	Arkansas County		
Chanticleer	1	Chicot County	71653	
Chapel Hill	1	Sevier County	71832	
Charleston	1	Franklin County	72933	
Charlotte	1	Independence County	72522	
Chatfield	1	Crittenden County	72323	
Cheatham	1	Sevier County		
Chelford	1	Mississippi County	72386	
Cherokee City	1	Benton County	72734	
Cherokee Village	2	Fulton County	72525	
Cherokee Village	2	Sharp County	72525	
Cherokee Village-Hidden Valley	2	Fulton County		
Cherokee Village-Hidden Valley	2	Sharp County		
Cherokee Village West	1	Fulton County	72529	
Cherry Hill	1	Perry County	72126	
Cherry Hill	1	Polk County	71936	
Cherry Valley	1	Cross County	72324	
Chester	1	Crawford County	72934	
Chicago, Rock Island & Pacific Junction	1	Crittenden County		
Chickalah	1	Yell County	72833	
Chickasawba	1	Mississippi County	72319	
Chicot	1	Chicot County	71640	
Chicot Terrace	1	Pulaski County	72209	
Chidester	1	Ouachita County	71726	
Childers	1	Prairie County		
Childress	1	Craighead County	72447	
Childress	1	Prairie County	72040	
Chilson	1	Craighead County	72421	
Chimes	1	Van Buren County	72645	
Chismville	1	Logan County	72943	
Choctaw	1	Van Buren County	72028	
Chula	1	Yell County		
Cicalla	1	St. Francis County		
Cincinnati	1	Washington County	72769	
Cisco	1	Carroll County		
Clantonville	1	Benton County		
Clarendon	1	Monroe County	72029	
Clarkdale	1	Crittenden County		
Clarkedale	1	Crittenden County	72325	
Clarkridge	1	Baxter County	72623	
Clarks Corner	1	St. Francis County	72394	
Clarksville	1	Johnson County	72830	
Claude	1	Van Buren County		
Clay	1	White County	72143	
Clear Lake	1	Mississippi County		
Clear Point	1	Benton County		
Clear Spring	1	Clark County		
Clearwater	1	Mississippi County		
Cleveland	1	Conway County	72030	
Clifty	1	Madison County	72756	
Clinton	1	Van Buren County	72031	
Clipper	1	Miller County		
Cloar	1	Crittenden County	72331	
Cloquet	1	Bradley County		
Clover Bend	1	Lawrence County	72433	
Cloverdale	1	Pulaski County		
Clow	1	Hempstead County	71855	
Clyde	1	Washington County	72717	
Coaldale	1	Scott County	74937	
Coal Hill	1	Johnson County	72832	
Cobbs	1	Lonoke County	72046	
Cody	1	Lee County	72360	
Coffeeville	1	Jackson County	72020	
Coffman	1	Greene County	72450	
Coffman	1	Lawrence County	72433	
Coin	1	Carroll County		
Coldwater	1	Cross County		
Cole	1	Little River County		
Coleman	1	Drew County	71655	
Coler	1	Hempstead County		
Cole Ridge	1	Mississippi County		
Cole Spur	1	Lincoln County	71643	
Colfax	1	Baxter County	72653	
College City	1	Lawrence County	72476	
College Heights	1	Drew County		
Collegehill	1	Columbia County	71752	
College Station	1	Pulaski County	72053	
Collegeville	1	Saline County	72002	
Collietown	1	Independence County		
Collins	1	Drew County	71634	
Colona	1	Woodruff County		
Colt	1	St. Francis County	72326	
Columbus	1	Hempstead County	71831	
Comal	1	Marion County		
Combs	1	Madison County	72721	
Comet	1	Little River County		
Cominto	1	Drew County	71655	
Compton	1	Newton County	72624	
Conant	1	White County		
Concord	1	Cleburne County	72523	
Concord	1	Crawford County		
Congo	1	Saline County	72015	
Connells Point	1	Monroe County		
Conner	1	Carroll County	72638	
Conway	1	Faulkner County	72032	
Cooleyville	1	Pike County		
Cooney	1	Dallas County		
Copeland	1	Van Buren County		
Copp	1	Crawford County		
Copper Mine	1	Benton County		
Cord	1	Independence County	72524	
Corinth	1	Howard County		
Corinth	1	Yell County	72824	
Corley	1	Logan County	72855	
Cornerstone	1	Jefferson County	72004	
Cornertown	1	Fulton County		
Cornerville	1	Lincoln County	71667	
Cornhill	1	Sevier County	71846	
Cornie	1	Union County		
Corning	1	Clay County	72422	
Cosgrove	1	Chicot County		
Cotter	1	Baxter County	72626	
Cotton Belt	1	Greene County		
Cotton Belt Junction	1	Monroe County	72021	
Cottondale	1	Jefferson County		
Cotton Plant	1	Woodruff County	72036	
Cotton Town	1	Logan County		
Cotton Town	1	Yell County	72834	
Cottonwood Corner	1	Craighead County	72447	
Cottonwood Corner	1	Mississippi County	72370	
Council	1	Lee County	72320	
Countiss	1	Phillips County		
Cove	1	Polk County	71937	
Cowan	1	Marion County		
Cowell	1	Newton County	72628	
Cowlingsville	1	Sevier County	71846	
Coy	1	Lonoke County	72037	
Cozahome	1	Searcy County	72639	
Crabtree	1	Van Buren County	72031	
Crain City	1	Union County		
Cram	1	Calhoun County		
Craney	1	Bradley County		
Cravens	1	Franklin County	72949	
Crawford	1	Boone County		
Crawfordsville	1	Crittenden County	72327	
Creech	1	Benton County		
Creigh	2	Monroe County	72366	
Creigh	2	Phillips County	72366	
Crest	1	Boone County		
Creswell	1	Izard County		
Cricket	1	Boone County		
Crigler	1	Lincoln County	71667	
Critco	1	Crittenden County		
Crittenden	1	Crittenden County		
Critten Ridge	1	Little River County	71836	
Crocker	1	Izard County		
Crockett	1	Clay County	72454	
Crocketts Bluff	1	Arkansas County	72038	
Croker	1	Izard County		
Crosby	1	White County		
Crosses	1	Madison County	72701	
Crossett	1	Ashley County	71635	
Cross Hollow	1	Benton County		
Cross Lanes	1	Crawford County		
Crossroad	1	Ashley County		
Crossroad	1	Newton County		
Cross Roads	1	Bradley County		
Crossroads	1	Cleburne County	72131	
Cross Roads	1	Grant County	72150	
Cross Roads	1	Hempstead County	71862	
Cross Roads	1	Hot Spring County	71933	
Crossroads	1	Izard County	72566	
Crossroads	1	Jackson County		
Cross Roads	1	Little River County	71866	
Cross Roads	1	Logan County	72863	
Cross Roads	1	Madison County	72738	
Cross Roads	1	Monroe County	72069	
Cross Roads	1	Ouachita County	71751	
Crossroads	1	Prairie County	72040	
Crossroads	1	Sebastian County		
Crossroads	1	Yell County		
Crow Creek	1	St. Francis County	72335	
Crows	1	Saline County		
Crumrod	1	Phillips County	72328	
Crystal Hill	1	Pulaski County	72118	
Crystal Springs	1	Garland County	71938	
Crystal Springs Landing	1	Garland County	71938	
Cuffman's Switch	1	Hot Spring County		
Cullendale	1	Ouachita County	71701	
Culp	1	Baxter County	72519	
Culpeper	1	Van Buren County	72031	
Cumi	1	Baxter County	72544	
Cummings Springs	1	Nevada County		
Current View	1	Clay County		
Curtis	1	Clark County	71728	
Cushman	1	Independence County	72526	
Cushman Junction	1	Independence County		
Cypert	1	Phillips County	72366	
Cypress Bend	1	Desha County		
Cypress Corner	1	Lee County	72355	
Cypress Valley	1	Conway County	72156	

== Townships ==
Name of place	Number of counties	Principal county	Lower zip code	Upper zip code
Cabanal Township	1	Carroll County		
Cache Township	1	Clay County		
Cache Township	1	Greene County		
Cache Township	1	Jackson County		
Cache Township	1	Lawrence County		
Cache Township	1	Monroe County		
Cache Township	1	Woodruff County		
Caddo Township	1	Clark County		
Caddo Township	1	Montgomery County		
Caddo Gap Township	1	Montgomery County		
Cadron Township	1	Cleburne County		
Cadron Township	1	Faulkner County		
Cadron Township	1	Van Buren County		
Cadron Township	1	White County		
Calf Creek Township	1	Searcy County		
Calhoun Township	1	Prairie County		
California Township	1	Cleburne County		
California Township	1	Faulkner County		
California Township	1	Madison County		
Calvert Township	1	Grant County		
Campbell Township	1	Lawrence County		
Campbell Township	1	Searcy County		
Canadian Township	1	Mississippi County		
Cane Township	1	White County		
Cane Creek Township	1	Lincoln County		
Cane Creek Township	1	Logan County		
Cane Hill Township	1	Washington County		
Caney Township	1	Little River County		
Caney Township	1	Montgomery County		
Caney Township	1	Nevada County		
Caney Township	1	Woodruff County		
Cargile Township	1	Van Buren County		
Carlisle Township	1	Lonoke County		
Carlton Township	1	Chicot County		
Caroline Township	1	Lonoke County		
Carpenter Township	1	Clay County		
Carroll Township	1	Ouachita County		
Carrollton Township	1	Boone County		
Carrollton Township	1	Carroll County		
Carson Township	1	Mississippi County		
Carson Lake Township	1	Mississippi County		
Carter Township	1	Ashley County		
Casa Township	1	Perry County		
Caswell Township	1	Calhoun County		
Catholic Point Township	1	Conway County		
Cauthron Township	1	Logan County		
Cauthron Township	1	Scott County		
Cave Township	1	Sharp County		
Cedar Township	1	Carroll County		
Cedar Township	1	Polk County		
Cedar Township	1	Scott County		
Cedar Creek Township	1	Crawford County		
Cedar Creek Township	1	Marion County		
Cedar Falls Township	1	Conway County		
Cedarville Township	1	Crawford County		
Center Township	1	Montgomery County		
Center Township	1	Polk County		
Center Township	1	Pope County		
Center Township	1	Prairie County		
Center Township	1	Sebastian County		
Center Township	1	Washington County		
Center Point Township	1	Howard County		
Center Post Township	1	Cleburne County		
Centerville Township	1	Yell County		
Chalk Bluff Township	1	Clay County		
Chalybeate Springs Township	1	Stone County		
Champagnolle Township	1	Calhoun County		
Cherokee Township	1	Benton County		
Cherokee Township	1	Sharp County		
Cherry Hill Township	1	Perry County		
Chester Township	1	Arkansas County		
Chester Township	1	Crawford County		
Chester Township	1	Dallas County		
Chickasawba Township	1	Mississippi County		
Choctaw Township	1	Lincoln County		
Choctaw Township	1	Van Buren County		
Chrisp Township	1	White County		
Christian Township	1	Independence County		
Claiborne Township	1	Izard County		
Clark Township	1	Clay County		
Clark Township	1	Greene County		
Clark Township	1	Logan County		
Clark Township	1	Pike County		
Clark Township	1	Pope County		
Clark Township	1	Searcy County		
Clay Township	1	Bradley County		
Clay Township	1	Howard County		
Clay Township	1	White County		
Clayton Township	1	Cleburne County		
Clayton Township	1	Desha County		
Clear Creek Township	1	Drew County		
Clear Creek Township	1	Hot Spring County		
Clear Creek Township	1	Sevier County		
Clear Lake Township	1	Mississippi County		
Cleburne Township	1	Monroe County		
Cleburne Township	1	Phillips County		
Cleveland Township	1	Clay County		
Cleveland Township	1	Fulton County		
Cleveland Township	1	Little River County		
Cleveland Township	1	Lonoke County		
Cleveland Township	1	Miller County		
Cleveland Township	1	Ouachita County		
Cleveland Township	1	Phillips County		
Cleveland Township	1	White County		
Clifton Township	1	Faulkner County		
Clifty Township	1	Carroll County		
Coal Township	1	Scott County		
Cobb Township	1	Franklin County		
Coffey Township	1	White County		
Coin Township	1	Carroll County		
Coldwater Township	1	Cross County		
Coldwell Township	1	White County		
Cole Township	1	Sebastian County		
Collier Township	1	Greene County		
Collins Township	1	Drew County		
Columbia Township	1	Randolph County		
Colville Township	1	Benton County		
Cominto Township	1	Drew County		
Compton Township	1	Yell County		
Convenience Township	1	Pope County		
Cornie Township	1	Union County		
Cotton Plant Township	1	Woodruff County		
Council Township	1	Lee County		
County Line Township	1	Howard County		
Cove Township	1	Polk County		
Cove Township	1	Stone County		
Cove City Township	1	Crawford County		
Cove Creek Township	1	Washington County		
Cow Lake Township	1	Jackson County		
Craig Township	1	Van Buren County		
Cravens Township	1	Franklin County		
Crawford Township	1	Washington County		
Crawford Township	1	Yell County		
Crockett Township	1	Arkansas County		
Crockett Township	1	Marion County		
Crook Township	1	Drew County		
Crooked Creek Township	1	Lonoke County		
Crooked Creek Township	1	Marion County		
Crosby Township	1	White County		
Cross Township	1	Carroll County		
Crowley Township	1	Greene County		
Culpepper Township	1	Van Buren County		
Current River Township	1	Randolph County		
Cushman Township	1	Independence County		
Cushman-Union Township	1	Independence County		
Cut Off Township	1	Miller County		
Cypert Township	1	White County		
Cypress Township	1	Faulkner County		
Cypress Township	1	Phillips County		
Cypress Ridge Township	1	Monroe County		
