= List of places in Arkansas: O =

Arkansas State Seal

This list of current cities, towns, unincorporated communities, and other recognized places in the U.S. state of Arkansas whose name begins with the letter O. It also includes information on the number and names of counties in which the place lies, and its lower and upper zip code bounds, if applicable.

== Cities and Towns ==
Name of place	Number of counties	Principal county	Lower zip code	Upper zip code
Oak Forest	1	Lee County	72360	
Oak Forest	1	Pulaski County		
Oakgrove	1	Carroll County	72660	
Oak Grove	1	Carroll County	72660	
Oak Grove	1	Cleveland County	71665	
Oak Grove	1	Crawford County		
Oak Grove	1	Hot Spring County	72104	
Oak Grove	1	Lonoke County	72007	
Oak Grove	1	Nevada County	71858	
Oakgrove	1	Perry County	72070	
Oak Grove	1	Pope County	72801	
Oak Grove	1	Pulaski County	72118	
Oak Grove	1	Sevier County	71846	
Oak Grove	1	Washington County		
Oak Grove Heights	1	Greene County	72443	
Oakhaven	1	Hempstead County	71801	
Oak Hill	1	Carroll County		
Oakland	1	Marion County	72661	
Oakland Heights	1	Jefferson County		
Oakland Heights	1	Pope County	72801	
Oaklawn	1	Garland County	71901	
Oak Park	1	Jefferson County	71603	
Oak Park	1	Sebastian County		
Oark	1	Johnson County	72852	
Oconee	1	Randolph County	72455	
Odell	1	Washington County		
Oden	1	Montgomery County	71961	
O'Donnell Bend	1	Mississippi County	72358	
Ogden	1	Little River County	71853	
Ogemaw	1	Ouachita County	71764	
Oil Trough	1	Independence County	72564	
Okay	1	Howard County		
Okay Junction	1	Howard County		
O'Kean	1	Randolph County	72449	
Okolona	1	Clark County	71962	
Ola	1	Yell County	72853	
Old Alabam	1	Madison County	72740	
Old Austin	1	Lonoke County	72007	
Old Bonnerdale	1	Garland County		
Old Botkinburg	1	Van Buren County		
Old Buffalo	1	Marion County		
Old Cove	1	Polk County		
Old Grand Glaise	1	Jackson County	72020	
Old Hickory	1	Conway County	72063	
Old Jenny Lind	1	Sebastian County	72906	
Old Joe	1	Baxter County	72658	
Old Lapile	1	Union County		
Old Lexington	1	Stone County		
Old Marble	1	Garland County		
Old Milo	1	Ashley County	71646	
Old Neely	1	Yell County	72834	
Old Town	1	Lafayette County		
Old Union	1	Union County	71730	
Old Weona	1	Poinsett County	72472	
Olena	1	Arkansas County		
Olio	1	Scott County		
Oliver	1	Scott County	72958	
Oliver Springs	1	Crawford County	72952	
Olmstead	1	Pulaski County	72116	
Olvey	1	Boone County	72601	
Olyphant	1	Jackson County	72020	
Oma	1	Hot Spring County	71964	
Omage	1	Searcy County		
Omaha	1	Boone County	72662	
Omega	1	Desha County		
Omega	1	Yell County	72834	
Onda	1	Washington County	72774	
O'Neal	1	Independence County		
One Horse Store	1	Arkansas County	72160	
Oneida	1	Phillips County	72369	
Onia	1	Stone County	72663	
Onyx	1	Yell County	72857	
Opal	1	Polk County	71932	
Opal	1	White County	72012	
Oppelo	1	Conway County	72110	
Optimus	1	Stone County	72519	
Orion	1	Grant County	72132	
Orlando	1	Cleveland County	71660	
Orton	1	Little River County		
Osage	1	Carroll County	72638	
Osage Mills	1	Benton County		
Osceola	1	Mississippi County	72370	
Ott	1	Fulton County	65626	
Otto	1	Faulkner County	72173	
Otwell	1	Craighead County	72401	
Ouachita	1	Dallas County	71763	
Ouachita College	1	Clark County	71923	
Ouita	1	Pope County	72801	
Overcup	1	Conway County	72110	
Overcup	1	Woodruff County	72101	
Owens	1	Columbia County		
Owensville	1	Saline County	72087	
Oxford	1	Izard County	72565	
Oxford Ford	1	Fulton County		
Oxley	1	Searcy County	72645	
Ozan	1	Hempstead County	71855	
Ozark	1	Franklin County	72949	
Ozark Acres	1	Sharp County	72482	
Ozark Lithia	1	Garland County	71901	
Ozone	1	Johnson County	72854	

== Townships ==
Name of place	Number of counties	Principal county	Lower zip code	Upper zip code
Oak Bluff Township	1	Clay County		
Oak Forest Township	1	Lee County		
Oak Grove Township	1	Lonoke County		
Oden Township	1	Montgomery County		
Oil Trough Township	1	Independence County		
O'Kean Township	1	Randolph County		
Old Hickory Township	1	Conway County		
Old River Township	1	Jefferson County		
Oliver Township	1	Scott County		
Oliver Springs Township	1	Crawford County		
Olvey Township	1	Boone County		
Omaha Township	1	Boone County		
Omega Township	1	Carroll County		
Optimus Township	1	Stone County		
Osage Township	1	Benton County		
Osage Township	1	Carroll County		
Osage Township	1	Newton County		
Otter Township	1	Saline County		
Ouachita Township	1	Bradley County		
Ouachita Township	1	Hot Spring County		
Ouachita Township	1	Montgomery County		
Ouachita Township	1	Polk County		
Owen Township	1	Dallas County		
Owen Township	1	Lincoln County		
Owen Township	1	Poinsett County		
Owen Township	1	Saline County		
Oxley Township	1	Searcy County		
Ozan Township	1	Hempstead County		
Ozark Township	1	Polk County		
Ozark Township	1	Sharp County		
