= Carrollton Township, Arkansas =

Carrollton Township, Arkansas may refer to:

- Carrollton Township, Boone County, Arkansas
- Carrollton Township, Carroll County, Arkansas

== See also ==
- List of townships in Arkansas
- Carrollton Township (disambiguation)
