= List of Arkansas placenames of Native American origin =

The following list includes settlements, geographic features, and political subdivisions of Arkansas whose names are derived from Native American languages.

== Listings ==
=== Counties ===
- Arkansas County, Arkansas – from the Illinois rendering of the tribal autonym kką:ze, which the Miami and Illinois used to refer to the Quapaw.
  - Arkansas River
- Mississippi County, Arkansas
  - Mississippi River
- Ouachita County, Arkansas – named after the Ouachita people.
  - Village of Ouachita
  - Lake Ouachita
  - Ouachita River
  - Ouachita Mountains
  - Ouachita National Forest

=== Settlements ===
- Alabam
  - Old Alabam
- Arkadelphia
- Bayou Township (Ashley County)
  - Bayou Township (Baxter County)
- Bayou Meto (Arkansas County)
  - Bayou Meto (Lonoke County)
- Caddo Gap
- Caddo Valley
  - Caddo River
- Cherokee Village – named after the Cherokee people.
- Chickalah
- Choctaw
- Cozahome
- Hatchie Coon
- Havana
- Illinois Township (Pope County)
  - Illinois Township (Washington County)
- Kentucky
- Little Arkansaw
- Modoc
- Newnata
- Northern Ohio
- Omaha
- Oneida
- Osage
  - Osage Mills
- Osceola
- Pocahontas
- Saginaw
- Saratoga
- Solgohachia – from the Choctaw word sok-ko-huch-cha, meaning "muscadine river".
- Tennessee
- Texarkana
- Tokalon
- Tomahawk
- Tomato
- Wabash
- Wabbaseka
- Wappanocca
- Winona

=== Bodies of water ===
- Camp Kia Kima Lake
- Meneshea Lake
- Nacoosa Paper Retention Pond
- Patocca Lower Lake and Patocca Upper Lake

== See also ==
- List of place names in the United States of Native American origin
