= Liberty Township, Arkansas =

Liberty Township, Arkansas may refer to:

- Liberty Township, Carroll County, Arkansas
- Liberty Township, Dallas County, Arkansas
- Liberty Township, Independence County, Arkansas
- Liberty Township, Lee County, Arkansas
- Liberty Township, Marion County, Arkansas
- Liberty Township, Ouachita County, Arkansas
- Liberty Township, Pope County, Arkansas
- Liberty Township, Saline County, Arkansas
- Liberty Township, Stone County, Arkansas
- Liberty Township, Van Buren County, Arkansas
- Liberty Township, White County, Arkansas

== See also ==
- List of townships in Arkansas
- Liberty Township (disambiguation)
