= Cedar Township, Arkansas =

Cedar Township, Arkansas may refer to:

- Cedar Township, Carroll County, Arkansas
- Cedar Township, Polk County, Arkansas
- Cedar Township, Scott County, Arkansas

== See also ==
- List of townships in Arkansas
- Cedar Township (disambiguation)
