= Carrollton Township =

Carrollton Township may refer to the following places in the United States:

- Carrollton Township, Boone County, Arkansas
- Carrollton Township, Carroll County, Arkansas
- Carrollton Township, Greene County, Illinois
- Carrollton Township, Carroll County, Indiana
- Carrollton Township, Michigan
