= John Campbell (Arkansas politician) =

American politician (1806–1879)

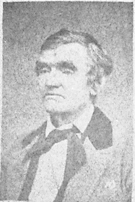
- Campbell in 1877

Member of the Arkansas House of Representatives
- In office 1842 – after 1852

Personal details
- Born: May 9, 1806 Warren County, Tennessee, US
- Died: November 19, 1879 (aged 73) Calf Creek Township, Searcy County, Arkansas, US

John Campbell (May 9, 1806 – November 19, 1879) was an American politician.

== Biography ==
Campbell was born on May 9, 1806, in Warren County, Tennessee, to James and Lucy Howard Campbell. He married Ann Blassingame in McNairy County, on July 29, 1835. They later moved to Batesville, Arkansas, then Snowball.

From 1840 to 1842, Campbell served as county judge of Searcy County, ending his tenure as judge after being elected to the Arkansas House of Representatives. He served until after 1852.

He served in the Mexican-American War. A Unionist, he initially voted against secession but was convinced otherwise by David Walker. He served in the Confederate States Army, later serving two terms in the Arkansas Senate.

Campbell was also the first Freemason in Searcy County. He died of diabetes, on November 19, 1879, aged 73, in Calf Creek Township. He is the namesake of Campbell, Searcy County.
