= Arkansas Highway 311 =

State highway in Arkansas, United States

Highway 311

Route information
- Maintained by ArDOT
- Length: 22.74 mi (36.60 km)
- Existed: 1962–present

Major junctions
- South end: Industrial Park Drive in Green Forest
- US 62 in Green Forest
- North end: AR 21 in Blue Eye

Location
- Country: United States
- State: Arkansas
- Counties: Carroll

Highway system
- Arkansas Highway System; Interstate; US; State; Business; Spurs; Suffixed; Scenic; Heritage
← AR 310	→ AR 312

Highway 311 (AR 311, Ark. 311, and Hwy. 311) is a north–south state highway in Carroll County, Arkansas. The route of 22.74 miles (36.60 km) runs from Industrial Park Drive in Green Forest north across US 62 through rural Carroll County to Highway 21 in Blue Eye.

== Route description ==
AR 311 begins in Green Forest at Industrial Park Drive. The route runs north and forms a concurrency with US 62 west for 0.4 miles (0.64 km) before turning north. Highway 311 begins to wind through rural areas in Carroll County, including Farewell, before terminating at AR 21 in Blue Eye.

== History ==
The route was designated a state highway under the jurisdiction of the Arkansas State Highway and Transportation Department (AHTD) between 1961 and 1963. The route is entirely two–lane undivided.

== Major intersections ==
Mile markers reset at concurrencies. The entire route is in Carroll County.

Location	mi	km	Destinations	Notes
Green Forest	0.00	0.00	Industrial Park Drive	southern terminus
Green Forest	0.42	0.68	US 62 east (Main Street) – Harrison	
Green Forest	US 62 concurrency west, 0.4 miles (0.64 km)			
Green Forest	0.00	0.00	US 62 west (Main Street) – Eureka Springs	
Blue Eye	22.32	35.92	AR 21 (Main Street) – Oak Grove, Berryville	northern terminus
1.000 mi = 1.609 km; 1.000 km = 0.621 mi

== See also ==
- List of state highways in Arkansas
