= Omega Township =

Omega Township may refer to the following townships in the United States:

- Omega Township, Carroll County, Arkansas
- Omega Township, Marion County, Illinois
- Omega Township, O'Brien County, Iowa
