= North Yocum Township, Carroll County, Arkansas =

North Yocum Township
- Township
- Location in Arkansas
- Coordinates: 36°28′24.35″N 93°27′16.55″W
- Country: United States
- State: Arkansas
- County: Carroll

Area
  - Total: 13.021 sq mi (33.72 km^{2})
  - Land: 13.004 sq mi (33.68 km^{2})
  - Water: 0.017 sq mi (0.044 km^{2})

Population (2010)
  - Total: 314
  - Density: 24.15/sq mi (9.32/km^{2})
- Time zone: UTC-6 (CST)
  - Summer (DST): UTC-5 (CDT)
- Zip Code: 72660 (Oak Grove)
- Area code: 870

North Yocum Township is one of twenty-one current townships in Carroll County, Arkansas, USA. As of the 2010 census, its total population was 314.

== Geography ==
According to the United States Census Bureau, North Yocum Township covers an area of 13.021 square miles (33.72 km^{2}); 13.004 square miles (33.68 km^{2}) of land and 0.017 square miles (0.044 km^{2}) of water.

=== Cities, towns, and villages ===
- Blue Eye (part)
- Oak Grove (part)
