= South Yocum Township, Carroll County, Arkansas =

South Yocum Township
- Township
- Location in Arkansas
- Coordinates: 36°28′24.35″N 93°27′16.55″W
- Country: United States
- State: Arkansas
- County: Carroll

Area
  - Total: 23.247 sq mi (60.21 km^{2})
  - Land: 23.247 sq mi (60.21 km^{2})
  - Water: 0 sq mi (0 km^{2})

Population (2010)
  - Total: 649
  - Density: 29.92/sq mi (11.55/km^{2})
- Time zone: UTC-6 (CST)
  - Summer (DST): UTC-5 (CDT)
- Zip Code: 72660 (Oak Grove)
- Area code: 870

South Yocum Township is one of twenty-one current townships in Carroll County, Arkansas, USA. As of the 2010 census, its total population was 649.

== Geography ==
According to the United States Census Bureau, South Yocum Township covers an area of 23.247 square miles (60.21 km^{2}); 23.247 square miles (60.21 km^{2}) of land and 0 square miles (0 km^{2}) of water.

=== Cities, towns, and villages ===
- Blue Eye (part)
- Oak Grove (part)
