= Oak Grove, Washington County, Arkansas =

Oak Grove, Arkansas
- Unincorporated community
- Oak Grove's position in Arkansas. Oak Grove, Arkansas (the United States)
- Coordinates: 36°11′23″N 94°11′14″W
- Country: United States
- State: Arkansas
- County: Washington
- Township: Springdale
- Elevation: 1,316 ft (401 m)
- Time zone: UTC-6 (Central (CST))
  - Summer (DST): UTC-5 (CDT)
- Area code: 479
- GNIS feature ID: 81883

Oak Grove (formerly Oakgrove) is an unincorporated community in Springdale Township of northern Washington County, Arkansas, United States. It is located on the northwest side of Springdale just east of the combined U.S. routes 62, 71, 540.
