= Beaver Township, Carroll County, Arkansas =

Beaver Township
- Township
- Location in Arkansas
- Coordinates: 36°28′15.26″N 93°48′6.81″W
- Country: United States
- State: Arkansas
- County: Carroll

Area
  - Total: 24.782 sq mi (64.19 km^{2})
  - Land: 23.722 sq mi (61.44 km^{2})
  - Water: 1.26 sq mi (3.3 km^{2})
- Elevation: 935 ft (285 m)

Population (2010)
  - Total: 1,787
  - Density: 75.33/sq mi (29.09/km^{2})
- Time zone: UTC-6 (CST)
  - Summer (DST): UTC-5 (CDT)
- Zip Code: 72613 (Beaver)
- Area code: 479
- GNIS feature ID: 66889

Beaver Township is one of 21 current townships in Carroll County, Arkansas, USA. As of the 2010 census, its total population was 1,787.

== Geography ==
According to the United States Census Bureau, Beaver Township covers an area of 24.982 square miles (64.70 km^{2}); 23.722 square miles (61.44 km^{2}) of land and 1.26 square miles (3.3 km^{2}) of water.

=== Cities, towns, villages, and CDPs ===
- Beaver
- Holiday Island (part)
