= Coin, Arkansas =

Unincorporated community in Arkansas, US

Coordinates: 36°19′49″N 93°20′53″W

Coin is an unincorporated community in eastern Carroll County, Arkansas, United States.

The community is just east of Dry Creek on County Road 421 approximately four miles northwest of Alpena. Hough on U.S. Route 62 is about two miles south on County Road 807.

== Transportation ==
While there is no fixed-route transit service in Coin, intercity bus service is provided by Jefferson Lines in nearby Green Forest.
