= Franklin Township, Carroll County, Arkansas =

Franklin Township
- Township
- Location in Arkansas
- Coordinates: 36°28′15.26″N 93°48′6.81″W
- Country: United States
- State: Arkansas
- County: Carroll

Area
  - Total: 10.639 sq mi (27.55 km^{2})
  - Land: 10.639 sq mi (27.55 km^{2})
  - Water: 0 sq mi (0 km^{2})

Population (2010)
  - Total: 1,269
  - Density: 119.28/sq mi (46.05/km^{2})
- Time zone: UTC-6 (CST)
  - Summer (DST): UTC-5 (CDT)
- Zip Code: 72613 (Beaver)
- Area code: 479

Franklin Township is one of twenty-one current townships in Carroll County, Arkansas, USA. As of the 2010 census, its total population was 1,269.

Franklin Township was established in 1884.

== Geography ==
According to the United States Census Bureau, Franklin Township covers an area of 10.639 square miles (27.55 km^{2}); 10.639 square miles (27.55 km^{2}) of land and 0 square miles (0 km^{2}) of water.

=== Cities, towns, villages, and CDPs ===
- Holiday Island (part)
