= Onda, Arkansas =

- Unincorporated community
- Onda's position in Arkansas Onda, Arkansas (the United States)
- Coordinates: 35°51′59.3″N 94°17′30.8″W
- Country: United States
- State: Arkansas
- County: Washington
- Township: Valley
- Elevation: 1,686 ft (514 m)
- Time zone: UTC-6 (Central (CST))
  - Summer (DST): UTC-5 (CDT)
- ZIP code: 72774
- Area code: 479
- GNIS feature ID: 72952

Onda is an unincorporated community in Valley Township, Washington County, Arkansas, United States. It is located on County Route 29 (Malico Mountain Road) south of Prairie Grove.
