= Clantonville, Arkansas =

Unincorporated community in Arkansas, US

Coordinates: 36°28′53″N 93°54′33″W

Clantonville is an unincorporated community in Benton County, Arkansas, United States.
