= Morrow Township, Washington County, Arkansas =

Township of Morrow
- Township
- Location of Morrow Township in Washington County

- Location of Washington County in Arkansas
- Coordinates: 35°52′15″N 94°26′1″W
- Country: United States
- State: Arkansas
- County: Washington

Area
  - Total: 11.3 sq mi (29 km^{2})
  - Land: 11.3 sq mi (29 km^{2})
  - Water: 0.0 sq mi (0 km^{2}) 0%
- Elevation: 1,129 ft (344 m)

Population (2000)
  - Total: 459
  - Density: 40/sq mi (15/km^{2})
- Time zone: UTC-6 (CST)
  - Summer (DST): UTC-5 (CDT)
- Area code: 479
- GNIS feature ID: 69796

Morrow Township is one of thirty-seven townships in Washington County, Arkansas, USA.

== Geography ==
According to the United States Census Bureau, Morrow Township covers an area of 11.3 square miles (29 km^{2}); all land.

=== Cities, towns, villages ===
- Morrow

=== Cemeteries ===
The township contains Bethesda Cemetery, Bethlehem Cemetery, Drake Cemetery, Edmiston Cemetery, and English Cemetery.

=== Major routes ===
- Arkansas Highway 45

== See also ==
- Twin Bridges Historic District
