= Hickory Township, Carroll County, Arkansas =

Hickory Township
- Township
- Location in Arkansas
- Coordinates: 36°20′53.71″N 93°25′26.35″W
- Country: United States
- State: Arkansas
- County: Carroll

Area
  - Total: 57.078 sq mi (147.83 km^{2})
  - Land: 57.078 sq mi (147.83 km^{2})
  - Water: 0 sq mi (0 km^{2})

Population (2010)
  - Total: 4,977
  - Density: 87.2/sq mi (33.7/km^{2})
- Time zone: UTC-6 (CST)
  - Summer (DST): UTC-5 (CDT)
- Zip Code: 72638 (Green Forest)
- Area code: 870

Hickory Township is one of twenty-one current townships in Carroll County, Arkansas, USA. As of the 2010 census, its total population was 4,977.

== Geography ==
According to the United States Census Bureau, Hickory Township covers an area of 57.078 square miles (147.83 km^{2}); 57.078 square miles (147.83 km^{2}) of land and 0 square miles (0 km^{2}) of water.

=== Cities, towns, villages, and CDPs ===
- Green Forest
