= Cedar Creek, Arkansas =

Unincorporated community in Arkansas, U.S.

Cedar Creek
- Unincorporated community
- Interactive map of Cedar Creek
- Coordinates: 35°N 94°W
- Country: United States
- State: Arkansas
- County: Scott County

Cedar Creek is an unincorporated community in Scott County, in the U.S. state of Arkansas.

== History ==
Cedar Creek was founded in 1852 and named after a stream of the same name near the town site. Variant names are "Big Cedar", "Cedar", and "Cedarcreek". The Cedar Creek post office was discontinued in 1973.
