= King's River Township, Carroll County, Arkansas =

Kings River Township
- Township
- Location in Arkansas
- Coordinates: 36°25′41.58″N 93°39′1.94″W
- Country: United States
- State: Arkansas
- County: Carroll

Area
  - Total: 14.980 sq mi (38.80 km^{2})
  - Land: 14.980 sq mi (38.80 km^{2})
  - Water: 0 sq mi (0 km^{2})

Population (2010)
  - Total: 625
  - Density: 41.72/sq mi (16.11/km^{2})
- Time zone: UTC-6 (CST)
  - Summer (DST): UTC-5 (CDT)
- Area code: 870

Kings River Township is one of twenty-one current townships in Carroll County, Arkansas, USA. As of the 2010 census, its total population was 625.

== Geography ==
According to the United States Census Bureau, Kings River Township covers an area of 14.980 square miles (38.80 km^{2}); 14.980 square miles (38.80 km^{2}) of land and 0 square miles (0 km^{2}) of water.
