= Long Creek Township, Carroll County, Arkansas =

Long Creek Township
- Township
- Location in Arkansas
- Coordinates: 36°25′44″N 93°20′5″W
- Country: United States
- State: Arkansas
- County: Carroll

Area
  - Total: 43.805 sq mi (113.45 km^{2})
  - Land: 42.834 sq mi (110.94 km^{2})
  - Water: 0.971 sq mi (2.51 km^{2})

Population (2010)
  - Total: 614
  - Density: 14.33/sq mi (5.53/km^{2})
- Time zone: UTC-6 (CST)
  - Summer (DST): UTC-5 (CDT)
- Area code: 870

Long Creek Township is one of twenty-one current townships in Carroll County, Arkansas, USA. As of the 2010 census, its total population was 614.

== Geography ==
According to the United States Census Bureau, Long Creek Township covers an area of 43.805 square miles (113.45 km^{2}); 42.834 square miles (110.94 km^{2}) of land and 0.971 square miles (2.51 km^{2}) of water.
