= Dry Fork Township, Carroll County, Arkansas =

Dry Fork Township
- Township
- Location in Arkansas
- Coordinates: 36°8′53.41″N 93°29′6.85″W
- Country: United States
- State: Arkansas
- County: Carroll

Area
  - Total: 23.263 sq mi (60.25 km^{2})
  - Land: 23.263 sq mi (60.25 km^{2})
  - Water: 0 sq mi (0 km^{2})

Population (2010)
  - Total: 292
  - Density: 12.55/sq mi (4.85/km^{2})
- Time zone: UTC-6 (CST)
  - Summer (DST): UTC-5 (CDT)
- Area code: 870

Dry Fork Township is one of twenty-one current townships in Carroll County, Arkansas, USA. As of the 2010 census, its total population was 292.

== Geography ==
According to the United States Census Bureau, Dry Fork Township covers an area of 23.263 square miles (60.25 km^{2}); 23.263 square miles (60.25 km^{2}) of land and 0 square miles (0 km^{2}) of water.
