= Polo Township, Carroll County, Arkansas =

Polo Township
- Township
- Nickname: Gu
- Location in Arkansas
- Coordinates: 36°26′36.67″N 93°32′40.15″W
- Country: United States
- State: Arkansas
- County: Carroll

Area
  - Total: 40.932 sq mi (106.01 km^{2})
  - Land: 40.938 sq mi (106.03 km^{2})
  - Water: 0.006 sq mi (0.016 km^{2})

Population (2010)
  - Total: 1,224
  - Density: 29.9/sq mi (11.5/km^{2})
- Time zone: UTC-6 (CST)
  - Summer (DST): UTC-5 (CDT)
- Zip Code: 72616 (Berryville)
- Area code: 870

Polo Township is one of twenty-one current townships in Carroll County, Arkansas, USA. As of the 2010 census, its total population was 1,224.

Polo Township was established in 1874.

== Geography ==
According to the United States Census Bureau, Polo Township covers an area of 40.938 square miles (106.03 km^{2}); 40.932 square miles (106.01 km^{2}) of land and 0.006 square miles (0.016 km^{2}) of water.

=== Cities, towns, villages, and CDPs ===
- Berryville (part)
