= Prairie Township, Carroll County, Arkansas =

Prairie Township
- Township
- Location in Arkansas
- Coordinates: 36°20′27.79″N 93°35′6.28″W
- Country: United States
- State: Arkansas
- County: Carroll

Area
  - Total: 70.850 sq mi (183.50 km^{2})
  - Land: 70.706 sq mi (183.13 km^{2})
  - Water: 0.144 sq mi (0.37 km^{2})

Population (2010)
  - Total: 7,555
  - Density: 106.85/sq mi (41.26/km^{2})
- Time zone: UTC-6 (CST)
  - Summer (DST): UTC-5 (CDT)
- Zip Code: 72616 (Berryville)
- Area code: 870

Prairie Township is one of twenty-one current townships in Carroll County, Arkansas, USA. As of the 2010 census, its total population was 7,555.

Prairie Township was formed prior to 1870; the exact date is unknown since county records were lost.

== Geography ==
According to the United States Census Bureau, Prairie Township covers an area of 70.850 square miles (183.50 km^{2}); 70.706 square miles (183.13 km^{2}) of land and 0.144 square miles (0.37 km^{2}) of water.

=== Cities, towns, villages, and CDPs ===
- Berryville (part)
