= Packard Springs Township, Carroll County, Arkansas =

Packard Springs Township
- Township
- Location in Arkansas
- Coordinates: 36°20′26.99″N 93°48′15.23″W
- Country: United States
- State: Arkansas
- County: Carroll

Area
  - Total: 35.705 sq mi (92.48 km^{2})
  - Land: 32.761 sq mi (84.85 km^{2})
  - Water: 2.944 sq mi (7.62 km^{2})

Population (2020)
  - Total: 595
  - Density: 22.44/sq mi (8.66/km^{2})
- Time zone: UTC-6 (CST)
  - Summer (DST): UTC-5 (CDT)
- Area code: 479

Packard Springs Township is one of twenty-one current townships in Carroll County, Arkansas, USA. As of the 2020 census, its total population was 595.

== Geography ==
According to the United States Census Bureau, Packard Springs Township covers an area of 35.705 square miles (92.48 km^{2}); 32.761 square miles (84.85 km^{2}) of land and 2.944 square miles (7.62 km^{2}) of water.
