= Wedington Township, Washington County, Arkansas =

Coordinates: 36.074°N 94.414°W

Wedington Township is an inactive township in Washington County, Arkansas, United States.

A variant name was "Weddington Township". The township was established in 1886.
