= Piney Township, Carroll County, Arkansas =

Piney Township
- Township
- Location in Arkansas
- Coordinates: 36°12′53″N 93°28′58″W
- Country: United States
- State: Arkansas
- County: Carroll

Area
  - Total: 16.150 sq mi (41.83 km^{2})
  - Land: 16.150 sq mi (41.83 km^{2})
  - Water: 0 sq mi (0 km^{2})

Population (2010)
  - Total: 226
  - Density: 13.99/sq mi (5.40/km^{2})
- Time zone: UTC-6 (CST)
  - Summer (DST): UTC-5 (CDT)
- Area code: 870

Piney Township is one of twenty-one current townships in Carroll County, Arkansas, USA. As of the 2010 census, its total population was 226.

The township was established in 1875, taking its name from the Piney Creek which runs through it.

== Geography ==
According to the United States Census Bureau, Piney Township covers an area of 16.150 square miles (41.83 km^{2}); 16.150 square miles (41.83 km^{2}) of land and 0 square miles (0 km^{2}) of water.
