= Liberty Township, Carroll County, Arkansas =

Liberty Township
- Township
- Location in Arkansas
- Coordinates: 36°15′42″N 93°26′49″W
- Country: United States
- State: Arkansas
- County: Carroll

Area
  - Total: 18.368 sq mi (47.57 km^{2})
  - Land: 18.368 sq mi (47.57 km^{2})
  - Water: 0 sq mi (0 km^{2})

Population (2010)
  - Total: 158
  - Density: 8.6/sq mi (3.3/km^{2})
- Time zone: UTC-6 (CST)
  - Summer (DST): UTC-5 (CDT)
- Area code: 870

Liberty Township is one of twenty-one current townships in Carroll County, Arkansas, USA. As of the 2010 census, its total population was 158.

== Geography ==
According to the United States Census Bureau, Liberty Township covers an area of 18.368 square miles (47.57 km^{2}); 18.368 square miles (47.57 km^{2}) of land and 0 square miles (0 km^{2}) of water.
