= Cross Township, Carroll County, Arkansas =

Cross Township
- Township
- Location in Arkansas
- Coordinates: 36°28′14.17″N 93°37′35.21″W
- Country: United States
- State: Arkansas
- County: Carroll

Area
  - Total: 15.335 sq mi (39.72 km^{2})
  - Land: 15.358 sq mi (39.78 km^{2})
  - Water: 0.023 sq mi (0.060 km^{2})

Population (2010)
  - Total: 284
  - Density: 18.52/sq mi (7.15/km^{2})
- Time zone: UTC-6 (CST)
  - Summer (DST): UTC-5 (CDT)
- Area code: 870

Cross Township is one of twenty-one current townships in Carroll County, Arkansas, USA. As of the 2010 census, its total population was 284.

== Geography ==
According to the United States Census Bureau, Cross Township covers an area of 15.358 square miles (39.78 km^{2}); 15.335 square miles (39.72 km^{2}) of land and 0.023 square miles (0.060 km^{2}) of water.
