= Coin Township, Carroll County, Arkansas =

Coin Township
- Township
- Location in Arkansas
- Coordinates: 36°19′22.46″N 93°19′42.08″W
- Country: United States
- State: Arkansas
- County: Carroll

Area
  - Total: 19.228 sq mi (49.80 km^{2})
  - Land: 19.191 sq mi (49.70 km^{2})
  - Water: 0.037 sq mi (0.096 km^{2})

Population (2010)
  - Total: 655
  - Density: 34.13/sq mi (13.18/km^{2})
- Time zone: UTC-6 (CST)
  - Summer (DST): UTC-5 (CDT)
- Zip Code: 72611 (Alpena)
- Area code: 870

Coin Township is one of twenty-one current townships in Carroll County, Arkansas, USA. Its population according to the 2020 census was 680, up from 655 at the 2010 census. The town features a suburban rural mix feel and most residents own their homes. There are many retirees that live in Coin Township and they tend to be conservative.

== Geography ==
According to the United States Census Bureau, Carrollton Township covers an area of 19.228 square miles (49.80 km^{2}), 19.191 square miles (49.70 km^{2}) of land and 0.037 square miles (0.096 km^{2}) of water.

=== Cities, towns and villages ===
- Alpena (part)

== Schools ==
The town is served by the Green Forest School District. There is an elementary, middle high, and intermediate school in the district.
