= Cabanal Township, Carroll County, Arkansas =

Cabanal Township
- Township
- Location in Arkansas
- Coordinates: 36°17′55.84″N 93°31′35.82″W
- Country: United States
- State: Arkansas
- County: Carroll

Area
  - Total: 22.979 sq mi (59.52 km^{2})
  - Land: 22.966 sq mi (59.48 km^{2})
  - Water: 0.013 sq mi (0.034 km^{2})
- Elevation: 1,286 ft (392 m)

Population (2010)
  - Total: 381
  - Density: 16.59/sq mi (6.41/km^{2})
- Time zone: UTC-6 (CST)
  - Summer (DST): UTC-5 (CDT)
- Area code: 870
- GNIS feature ID: 66890

Cabanal Township is one of twenty-one current townships in Carroll County, Arkansas, USA. As of the 2010 census, its total population was 381.

== Geography ==
According to the United States Census Bureau, Cabanal Township covers an area of 22.979 square miles (59.52 km^{2}); 22.966 square miles (59.48 km^{2}) of land and 0.013 square miles (0.034 km^{2}) of water.
