= Holiday Island, Arkansas =

- City
- Location of Holiday Island in Carroll County, Arkansas.

- Location within Arkansas
- Coordinates: 36°28′47″N 93°44′19″W
- Country: United States
- State: Arkansas
- County: Carroll

Area
  - Total: 10.90 sq mi (28.22 km^{2})
  - Land: 10.76 sq mi (27.86 km^{2})
  - Water: 0.14 sq mi (0.36 km^{2})
- Elevation: 1,040 ft (320 m)

Population (2020)
  - Total: 2,533
  - Estimate (2025): 2,440 ▼
  - Density: 235.5/sq mi (90.92/km^{2})
- Time zone: UTC-6 (Central (CST))
  - Summer (DST): UTC-5 (CDT)
- ZIP code: 72631
- Area code: 479
- GNIS feature ID: 2829832
- Website: www.cityofholidayisland.com

Holiday Island is a 4,500-acre planned retirement and vacation community in Carroll County, Arkansas, United States. Formerly an unincorporated community and census-designated place, it voted to incorporate in November 2020. As of the 2020 census, the population was 2,533. Holiday Island is located in the Ozark Mountains on Table Rock Lake, near Eureka Springs, Arkansas and approximately an hour's drive from Branson, Missouri, Fayetteville, Arkansas, and Bentonville, Arkansas. Community growth has been fueled by the expansion of corporate giants headquartered in Northwest Arkansas, namely Walmart, Tyson Foods, and J.B. Hunt; the entertainment attractions in Eureka Springs, AR and Branson, MO; the visitor traffic from the Crystal Bridges Museum of American Art, the Pea Ridge National Military Park, and the Roaring River State Park; and the influence of University of Arkansas, the state's largest university.

== Background ==
Resort amenities include lake access, a shopping center, tennis courts, pickleball courts, miniature golf, horseshoe pits, basketball courts, softball field, table & paddle tennis, shuffleboard, two swimming pools, picnic pavilion, campground, marina, boat & RV storage, clubhouse and recreation center, 9-hole executive golf course, 18-hole golf course, and hiking/biking trails. The facilities host wedding receptions, gala events, holiday celebrations, family & class reunions, jamborees & festivals, spiritual retreats, and company picnics. Its location in the Ozarks allows for four seasons that include mild winters and summers.

The community has three fire stations, a fire chief, and two full-time firefighters/EMTs with a volunteer crew of twenty-five firefighters/emergency medical care personnel. The district contracts with the Carroll County Sheriff's Office to provide year-round security.

Holiday Island Suburban Improvement District (HISID) was formed in 1970 by the Holly Corporation in collaboration with McCulloch Oil Corporation under Title 14, Subtitle 5, Chapter 92 of the Arkansas Code (“Suburban Improvement Districts”). The HISID's formation was to provide water, sewer, waste management, and fire services to Holiday Island property owners, and to maintain roads and recreational facilities in Holiday Island. McCulloch sold the developer rights in 1990 to manager Tom Dees. Amenities are provided and maintained by the Holiday Island Suburban Improvement District [HISID] through the collection of annual assessments.

Qualified electors within the new boundaries of Holiday Island voted to approve incorporation as the Town of Holiday Island on Nov. 3, 2020. The Carroll County Judge ordered the town organized (INCORPORATED TOWN) on Dec. 3, 2020. On March 23, 2021, the Secretary of State elevated Holiday Island to a City of the 2nd Class. Newly elected city officials began setting up the city government, establishing zoning and planning ordinances and working toward establishing voting wards for the general election in 2022.

The partnership with the Holiday Island Suburban Improvement District will continue until the city's tax base expands enough to independently support services—then, the city will offer services beyond the scope of the district.

The city was to begin receiving its share of Arkansas and Carroll County sales taxes, road taxes, property taxes and turnback funds in 2021 based upon population of full-time residents. Those revenues would enable the town to provide an economically sustainable way to better take care of the aging infrastructure in Holiday Island, preserve the lifestyle that the original developers envisioned, and assure proper standards are met for development and growth.

== Demographics ==
Historical population
| Census | Pop. | Note | %± |
|---|---|---|---|
| 2010 | 2,373 | | — |
| 2020 | 2,533 | | 6.7% |
| 2025 (est.) | 2,440 | ▼ | −3.7% |
U.S. Decennial Census; 2010 2020

=== 2020 census ===
Holiday Island, Arkansas – Racial and ethnic composition Note: the U.S. census treats Hispanic/Latino as an ethnic category. This table excludes Latinos from the racial categories and assigns them to a separate category. Hispanics/Latinos may be of any race.
| Race / Ethnicity (NH = Non-Hispanic) | Pop 2010 | Pop 2020 | % 2010 | % 2020 |
|---|---|---|---|---|
| White alone (NH) | 2,236 | 2,248 | 94.23% | 88.75% |
| Black or African American alone (NH) | 4 | 17 | 0.17% | 0.67% |
| Native American or Alaska Native alone (NH) | 21 | 31 | 0.88% | 1.22% |
| Asian alone (NH) | 19 | 9 | 0.80% | 0.36% |
| Pacific Islander alone (NH) | 0 | 0 | 0.00% | 0.00% |
| Some Other Race alone (NH) | 1 | 12 | 0.04% | 0.47% |
| Mixed Race or Multi-Racial (NH) | 25 | 86 | 1.05% | 3.40% |
| Hispanic or Latino (any race) | 67 | 130 | 2.82% | 5.13% |
| Total | 2,373 | 2,533 | 100.00% | 100.00% |
