= Winona Township, Carroll County, Arkansas =

Winona Township
- Township
- Location in Arkansas
- Coordinates: 36°20′40.31″N 93°41′49.28″W
- Country: United States
- State: Arkansas
- County: Carroll

Area
  - Total: 23.889 sq mi (61.87 km^{2})
  - Land: 23.889 sq mi (61.87 km^{2})
  - Water: 0 sq mi (0 km^{2})

Population (2010)
  - Total: 453
  - Density: 18.96/sq mi (7.32/km^{2})
- Time zone: UTC-6 (CST)
  - Summer (DST): UTC-5 (CDT)
- Zip Code: 72631-72632 (Eureka Springs)
- Area code: 479

Winona Township is one of twenty-one current townships in Carroll County, Arkansas, USA. As of the 2010 census, its total population was 453.

Winona Township was established in 1882.

== Geography ==
According to the United States Census Bureau, Winona Township covers an area of 23.889 square miles (61.87 km^{2}); 23.889 square miles (61.87 km^{2}) of land and 0 square miles (0 km^{2}) of water.

=== Cities, towns, and villages ===
- Eureka Springs (part)
