= Blue Eye, Arkansas =

- Town
- Location of Blue Eye in Carroll County, Arkansas.
- Coordinates: 36°29′48″N 93°23′51″W
- Country: United States
- State: Arkansas
- County: Carroll

Government
  - Mayor: Sondra Eby

Area
  - Total: 0.073 sq mi (0.19 km^{2})
  - Land: 0.073 sq mi (0.19 km^{2})
  - Water: 0 sq mi (0.00 km^{2})
- Elevation: 1,286 ft (392 m)

Population (2020)
  - Total: 46
  - Estimate (2025): 43 ▼
  - Density: 614/sq mi (236.9/km^{2})
- Time zone: UTC-6 (Central (CST))
  - Summer (DST): UTC-5 (CDT)
- Postal code: 72660
- Area code: 870
- FIPS code: 05-07150
- GNIS feature ID: 2405282

Blue Eye is an incorporated town in Carroll County, Arkansas, United States. The population was 46 at the 2020 census. The population estimate is 33 as of 2024. Blue Eye, Arkansas, is adjacent to Blue Eye, Missouri.

== Geography ==
Blue Eye is the northernmost settlement in the state of Arkansas. The town is contiguous with Blue Eye, Missouri on the north side of the border. Arkansas Highway 21 ends at the border and continues north as Missouri Route 13. The community lies south of Table Rock Lake.

According to the United States Census Bureau, the town has a total area of 0.07 square miles (0.18 km^{2}), all land.

=== List of highways ===
- Arkansas Highway 21
- Arkansas Highway 311

== Demographics ==
Historical population
Census	Pop.	Note	%±
1960	69		—
1970	53		−23.2%
1980	43		−18.9%
1990	38		−11.6%
2000	36		−5.3%
2010	30		−16.7%
2020	46		53.3%
2025 (est.)	43	▼	−6.5%
U.S. Decennial Census; 2014 Estimate

As of the census of 2000, there were 36 people, 14 households, and 11 families residing in the town. The population density was 198.6 people/km^{2} (514 people/mi^{2}). There were 18 housing units at an average density of 99.3 units/km^{2} (257 units/mi^{2}). The racial makeup of the town was 91.67% White, and 8.33% from two or more races.

There were 14 households, out of which 21.4% had children under the age of 18 living with them, 64.3% were married couples living together, 14.3% had a female householder with no husband present, and 21.4% were non-families. 21.4% of all households were made up of individuals, and 7.1% had someone living alone who was 65 years of age or older. The average household size was 2.57 and the average family size was 2.91.

In the town, the population was spread out, with 19.4% under the age of 18, 8.3% from 18 to 24, 33.3% from 25 to 44, 22.2% from 45 to 64, and 16.7% who were 65 years of age or older. The median age was 38 years. For every 100 females, there were 89.5 males. For every 100 females age 18 and over, there were 93.3 males.

The median income for a household in the town was $21,875, and the median income for a family was $36,250. Males had a median income of $21,000 versus $40,417 for females. The per capita income for the town was $15,358. None of the population and none of the families were below the poverty line.

== In popular culture ==
Blue Eye was the home of the fictional character Bob Lee Swagger, protagonist of various novels by film critic and author Stephen Hunter.
