= Olvey Township, Boone County, Arkansas =

Olvey Township
- Township
- Location in Arkansas
- Coordinates: 36°11′55.46″N 92°57′35.95″W
- Country: United States
- State: Arkansas
- County: Boone

Area
  - Total: 11.82 sq mi (30.6 km^{2})
  - Land: 11.807 sq mi (30.58 km^{2})
  - Water: 0.013 sq mi (0.034 km^{2})

Population (2010)
  - Total: 440
  - Density: 37.27/sq mi (14.39/km^{2})
- Time zone: UTC-6 (CST)
  - Summer (DST): UTC-5 (CDT)
- Zip Code: 72601 (Harrison)
- Area code: 870

Olvey Township is one of twenty current townships in Boone County, Arkansas, USA. As of the 2010 census, its total population was 440.

== Geography ==
According to the United States Census Bureau, Olvey Township covers an area of 11.82 square miles (30.6 km^{2}); 11.807 square miles (30.58 km^{2}) of land and 0.013 square miles (0.034 km^{2}) of water.

== Population history ==
Historical population
Census	Pop.	Note	%±
1920	587		—
1930	444		−24.4%
1940	304		−31.5%
1950	340		11.8%
1960	239		−29.7%
1970	274		14.6%
1980	367		33.9%
1990	446		21.5%
2000	493		10.5%
2010	440		−10.8%
