= California Township, Faulkner County, Arkansas =

Township of California
- Township
- Location within Arkansas
- Coordinates: 35°19′10.3″N 92°20′00.6″W
- Country: United States
- State: Arkansas
- County: Faulkner

Area
  - Total: 36.3 sq mi (94 km^{2})
  - Land: 36.2 sq mi (94 km^{2})
  - Water: 0.1 sq mi (0.26 km^{2})
- Elevation: 702 ft (214 m)

Population (2000)
  - Total: 1,467
  - Density: 40/sq mi (15/km^{2})
- Time zone: UTC-6 (CST)
  - Summer (DST): UTC-5 (CDT)
- Area code: 501
- GNIS feature ID: 66524

California Township is one of 22 townships in Faulkner County, Arkansas, United States. As of the 2000 census, its unincorporated population was 1,467. The township experienced much unusual geologic activity with the Guy-Greenbrier earthquake swarm in 2010–2011.

== Geography ==
According to the United States Census Bureau, California Township covers an area of 36.3 square miles (94 km^{2}); with 36.2 square miles (94 km^{2}) being land and the remaining 0.1 square miles (0.26 km^{2}) water. Woolly Hollow State Park is in the southeast corner of the township.

=== Cities, towns, villages ===
- Guy
- Old Texas (unincorporated)
- Rowlett (historical)

=== Cemeteries ===
The township contains Copperas Springs Cemetery, King Cemetery, McNew Cemetery, Mode Cemetery, and Old Texas Cemetery.

=== Major routes ===
The township contains Arkansas Highway 25, Arkansas Highway 310, and Arkansas Highway 285. A very brief portion of U.S. Route 65 runs in the southwest corner of the township.
