= Convenience Township, Pope County, Arkansas =

Convenience Township
- Township
- Location in Arkansas
- Coordinates: 35°20′00″N 92°56′41″W
- Country: United States
- State: Arkansas
- County: Pope

Area
  - Total: 18.64 sq mi (48.3 km^{2})
  - Land: 18.56 sq mi (48.1 km^{2})
  - Water: 0.08 sq mi (0.21 km^{2})
- Elevation: 682 ft (208 m)

Population (2010)
  - Total: 892
  - Density: 48.1/sq mi (18.6/km^{2})
- Time zone: UTC-6 (CST)
  - Summer (DST): UTC-5 (CDT)
- Area code: 870
- GNIS feature ID: 69701

Convenience Township is one of nineteen current townships in Pope County, Arkansas, USA. As of the 2010 census, its unincorporated population was 892.

== Geography ==
According to the United States Census Bureau, Convenience Township covers an area of 18.64 square miles (48.3 km^{2}); 18.56 square miles (48.1 km^{2}) of land and 0.08 square miles (0.21 km^{2}) of water.
