= Oxley Township, Searcy County, Arkansas =

Oxley Township
- Township
- Location in Arkansas
- Coordinates: 35°52′2″N 92°27′47″W
- Country: United States
- State: Arkansas
- County: Searcy

Area
  - Total: 32.045 sq mi (83.00 km^{2})
  - Land: 32.018 sq mi (82.93 km^{2})
  - Water: 0.027 sq mi (0.070 km^{2})

Population (2010)
  - Total: 364
  - Density: 11.37/sq mi (4.39/km^{2})
- Time zone: UTC-6 (CST)
  - Summer (DST): UTC-5 (CDT)
- Zip Code: 72645 (Leslie)
- Area code: 870

Oxley Township is one of fifteen current townships in Searcy County, Arkansas, USA. As of the 2010 census, its total population was 364.

== Geography ==
According to the United States Census Bureau, Oxley Township covers an area of 32.045 square miles (83.00 km^{2}); 32.018 square miles (82.93 km^{2}) of land and 0.027 square miles (0.070 km^{2}) of water.
