= Osage Township, Carroll County, Arkansas =

Osage Township
- Township
- Location in Arkansas
- Coordinates: 36°9′53.66″N 93°22′33.67″W
- Country: United States
- State: Arkansas
- County: Carroll

Area
  - Total: 45.215 sq mi (117.11 km^{2})
  - Land: 45.196 sq mi (117.06 km^{2})
  - Water: 0.019 sq mi (0.049 km^{2})

Population (2010)
  - Total: 418
  - Density: 9.25/sq mi (3.57/km^{2})
- Time zone: UTC-6 (CST)
  - Summer (DST): UTC-5 (CDT)
- Area code: 870

Osage Township is one of twenty-one current townships in Carroll County, Arkansas, USA. As of the 2010 census, its total population was 418.

Osage Township was formed prior to 1870; the exact date is unknown since county records were lost.

== Geography ==
According to the United States Census Bureau, Osage Township covers an area of 45.215 square miles (117.11 km^{2}); 45.196 square miles (117.06 km^{2}) of land and 0.019 square miles (0.049 km^{2}) of water.
