= Calf Creek Township, Searcy County, Arkansas =

Calf Creek Township
- Township
- Location in Arkansas
- Coordinates: 35°54′12″N 92°50′49″W
- Country: United States
- State: Arkansas
- County: Searcy

Area
  - Total: 81.716 sq mi (211.64 km^{2})
  - Land: 81.202 sq mi (210.31 km^{2})
  - Water: 0.514 sq mi (1.33 km^{2})

Population (2010)
  - Total: 326
  - Density: 4.01/sq mi (1.55/km^{2})
- Time zone: UTC-6 (CST)
  - Summer (DST): UTC-5 (CDT)
- Area code: 870

Calf Creek Township is one of fifteen current townships in Searcy County, Arkansas, USA. As of the 2010 census, its total population was 326.

== Geography ==
According to the United States Census Bureau, Calf Creek Township covers an area of 81.716 square miles (211.64 km^{2}); 81.202 square miles (210.31 km^{2}) of land and 0.514 square miles (1.33 km^{2}) of water.

== History ==
Calf Creek was named after a local legend of a white bison calf that was found in a nearby creek in 1846 by an unnamed Muscogee medicine man and his Scots-Irish guide Marcus Cornell. According to the story, the calf signified that better times were soon to come and that future generations would live in prosperity. Cornell is then said to have built a small cabin in next to the creek, where he raised five children and hunted until he reached old age. Although the historicity of the legend is uncertain, it has stuck with the township's population for decades and remains a part of the public consciousness.

Calf Creek was home to the archaic Calf Creek culture, known by archeological finds at Calf Creek Cave, also known as Snowball or Slay Cave.
