= Carrollton Township, Boone County, Arkansas =

Carrollton Township
- Township
- Location in Arkansas
- Coordinates: 36°18′0.91″N 93°16′22.81″W
- Country: United States
- State: Arkansas
- County: Boone

Area
  - Total: 26.149 sq mi (67.73 km^{2})
  - Land: 25.935 sq mi (67.17 km^{2})
  - Water: 0.214 sq mi (0.55 km^{2})

Population (2010)
  - Total: 843
  - Density: 32.5/sq mi (12.5/km^{2})
- Time zone: UTC-6 (CST)
  - Summer (DST): UTC-5 (CDT)
- Zip Code: 72611 (Alpena)
- Area code: 870

Carrollton Township is one of twenty townships in Boone County, Arkansas, USA. As of the 2010 census, it had a total population of 843.

== Geography ==
According to the United States Census Bureau, Carrollton Township covers an area of 26.149 square miles (67.73 km^{2}); consisting of 25.935 square miles (67.17 km^{2}) of land and 0.214 square miles (0.55 km^{2}) of water.

=== Cities, towns, and villages ===
- Alpena (part)

== Population history ==
Between 1920 and 1980, the population of Carrollton Township in Boone County included the total population of the town of Alpena, even though Alpena lies in both Boone County and parts of two townships in Carroll County. Starting in 2000, the US Census began reporting Alpena's population by township across both counties.

Historical population
Census	Pop.	Note	%±
1870	577		—
1880	802		39.0%
1890	1,129		40.8%
1900	1,212		7.4%
1910	664		−45.2%
1920	693		4.4%
1930	812		17.2%
1940	732		−9.9%
1950	665		−9.2%
1960	568		−14.6%
1970	648		14.1%
1980	753		16.2%
1990	777		3.2%
2000	768		−1.2%
2010	843		9.8%
