= Cedar Township, Carroll County, Arkansas =

Cedar Township
- Township
- Location in Arkansas
- Coordinates: 36°24′15.08″N 93°47′3.94″W
- Country: United States
- State: Arkansas
- County: Carroll

Area
  - Total: 35.742 sq mi (92.57 km^{2})
  - Land: 35.734 sq mi (92.55 km^{2})
  - Water: 0.008 sq mi (0.021 km^{2})
- Elevation: 1,178 ft (359 m)

Population (2010)
  - Total: 3,575
  - Density: 78.9/sq mi (30.5/km^{2})
- Time zone: UTC-6 (CST)
  - Summer (DST): UTC-5 (CDT)
- Zip Code: 72631-72632 (Eureka Springs)
- Area code: 479
- GNIS feature ID: 66892

Cedar Township is one of twenty-one current townships in Carroll County, Arkansas, USA. As of the 2010 census, its total population was 3,575.

== Geography ==
According to the United States Census Bureau, Cedar Township covers an area of 35.742 square miles (92.57 km^{2}); 35.734 square miles (92.55 km^{2}) of land and 0.008 square miles (0.021 km^{2}) of water.

=== Cities, towns, and villages ===
- Eureka Springs (part)
