= Omega Township, Carroll County, Arkansas =

Omega Township
- Township
- Location in Arkansas
- Coordinates: 36°12′48″N 93°33′51″W
- Country: United States
- State: Arkansas
- County: Carroll

Area
  - Total: 34.778 sq mi (90.07 km^{2})
  - Land: 34.778 sq mi (90.07 km^{2})
  - Water: 0 sq mi (0 km^{2})

Population (2010)
  - Total: 489
  - Density: 14.06/sq mi (5.43/km^{2})
- Time zone: UTC-6 (CST)
  - Summer (DST): UTC-5 (CDT)
- Area code: 870

Omega Township is one of twenty-one current townships in Carroll County, Arkansas, USA. As of the 2010 census, its total population was 418. As of the 2010 census, the population of Carroll County was 27,446

== Geography ==
According to the United States Census Bureau, Omega Township covers an area of 34.778 square miles (90.07 km^{2}); 34.778 square miles (90.07 km^{2}) of land and 0 square miles (0 km^{2}) of water.
