= Omaha Township, Boone County, Arkansas =

Omaha Township
- Township
- Location in Arkansas
- Coordinates: 36°27′47.73″N 93°10′23.83″W
- Country: United States
- State: Arkansas
- County: Boone

Area
  - Total: 78.986 sq mi (204.57 km^{2})
  - Land: 77.985 sq mi (201.98 km^{2})
  - Water: 1.001 sq mi (2.59 km^{2})

Population (2010)
  - Total: 2,267
  - Density: 29.07/sq mi (11.22/km^{2})
- Time zone: UTC-6 (CST)
  - Summer (DST): UTC-5 (CDT)
- Zip Code: 72662 (Omaha)
- Area code: 870

Omaha Township is one of twenty current townships in Boone County, Arkansas, USA. As of the 2010 census, its total population was 2,267.

== Geography ==
According to the United States Census Bureau, Omaha Township covers an area of 78.986 square miles (204.57 km^{2}); 77.985 square miles (201.98 km^{2}) of land and 1.001 square miles (2.59 km^{2}) of water.

=== Cities, towns, and villages ===
- Omaha

== Population history ==
Figures below include the population of the incorporated town of Omaha.

Census	Population
2010	2,267
2000	1,920
1990	1,251
1980	1,077
1970	774
1960	731
1950	807
1940	866
1930	893
1920	1,041
1910	879
1900	573
1890	532
1880	273
