= Carroll County, Arkansas =

County in Arkansas, United States

- County
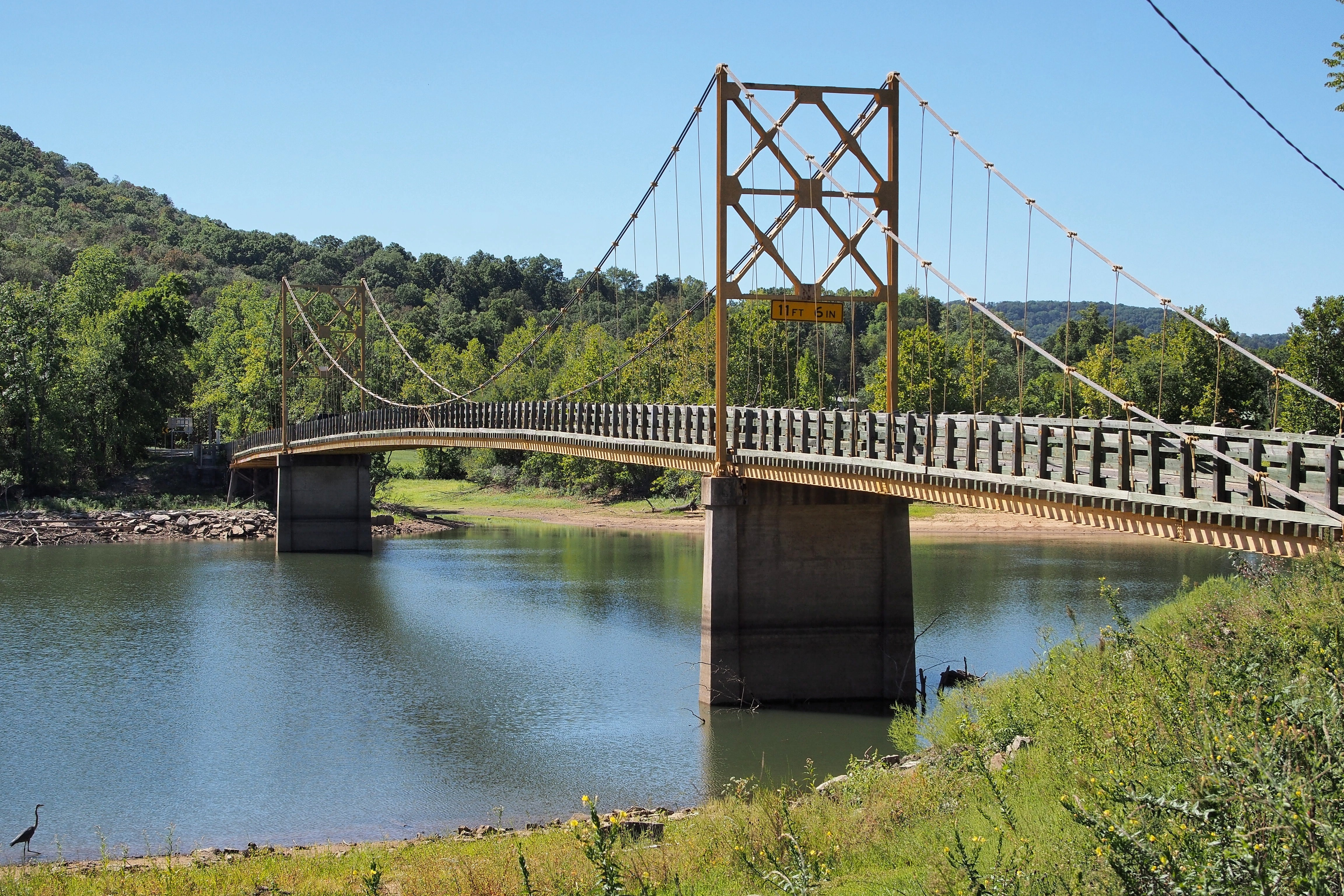
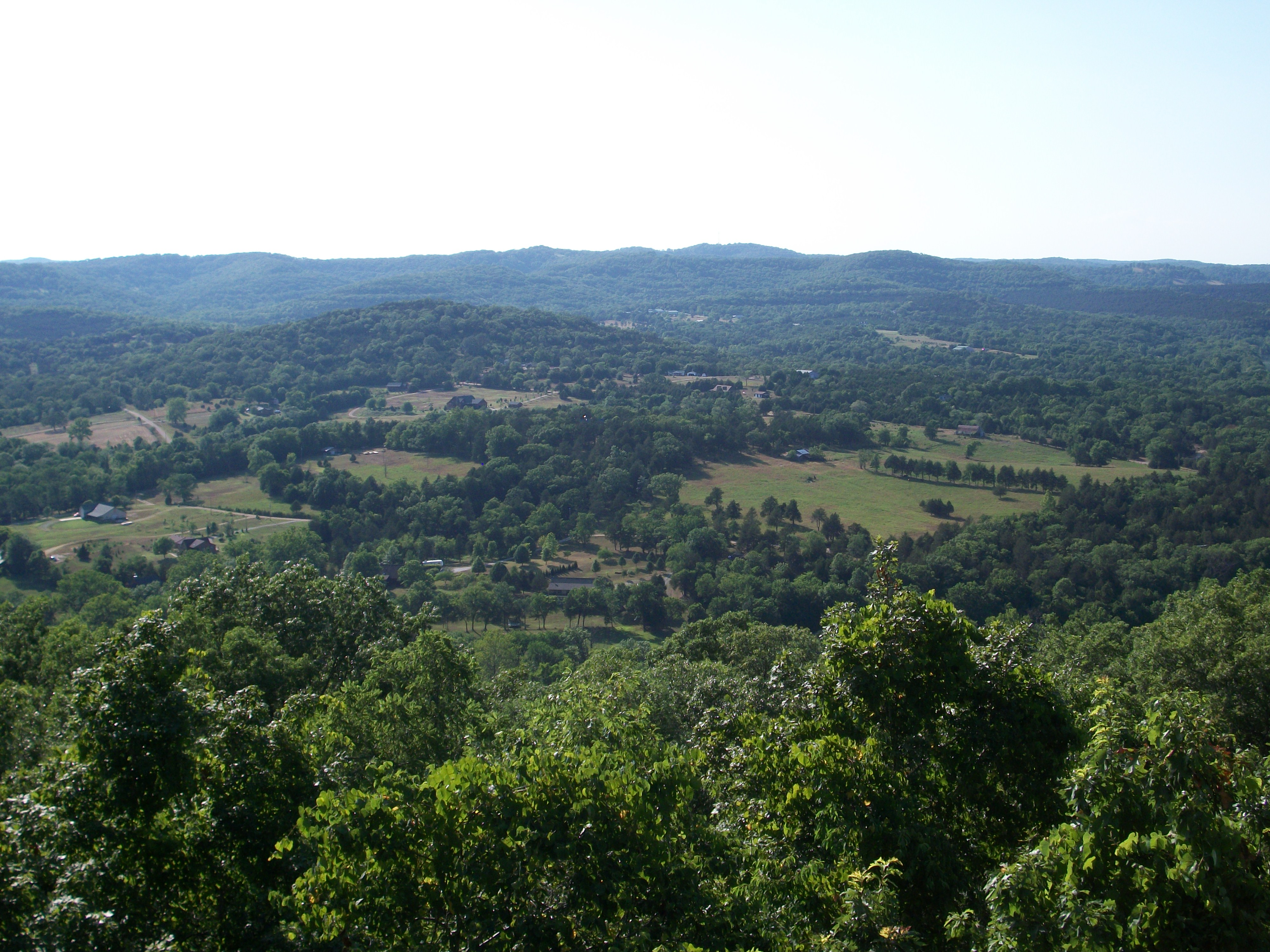
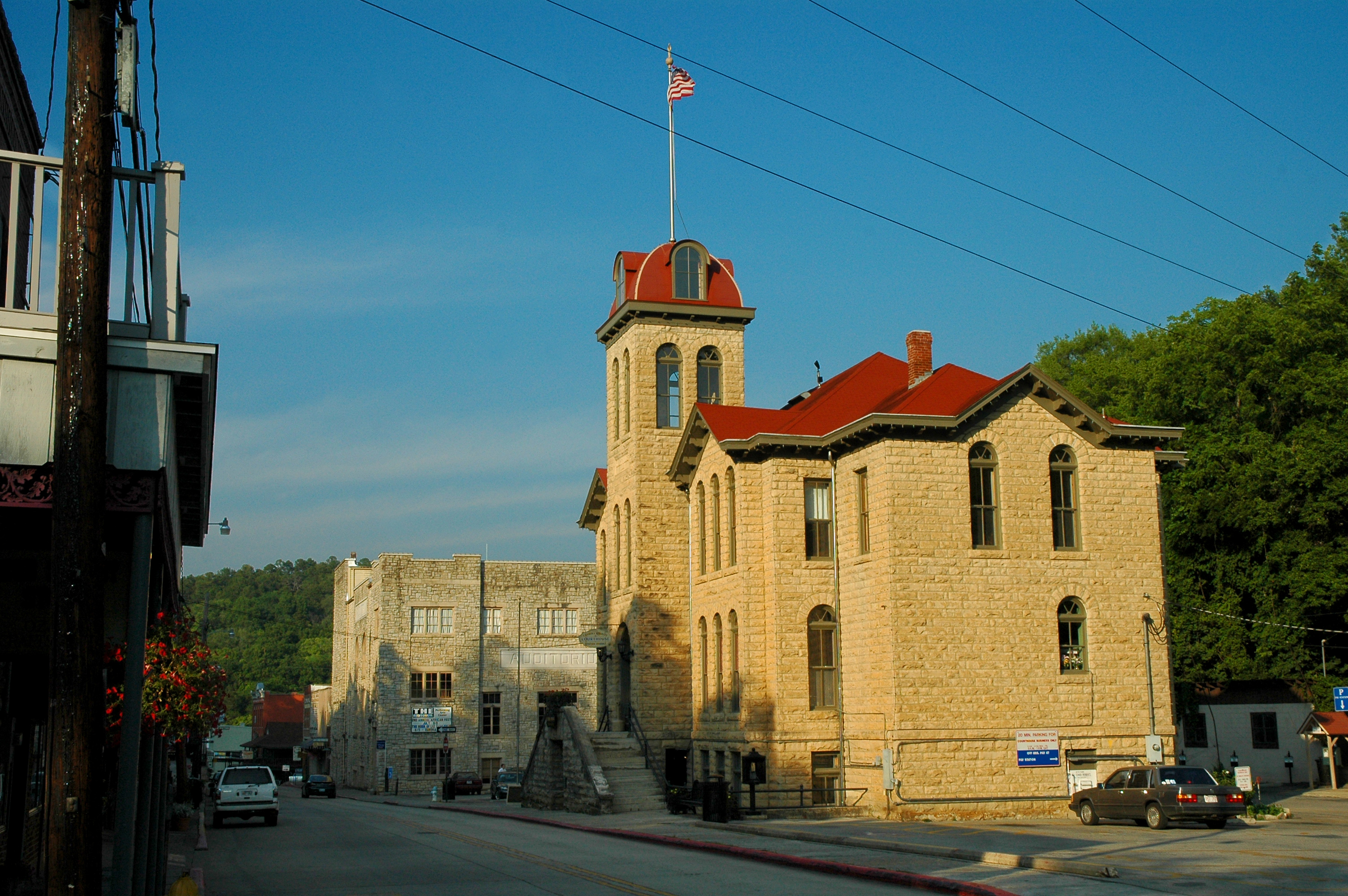
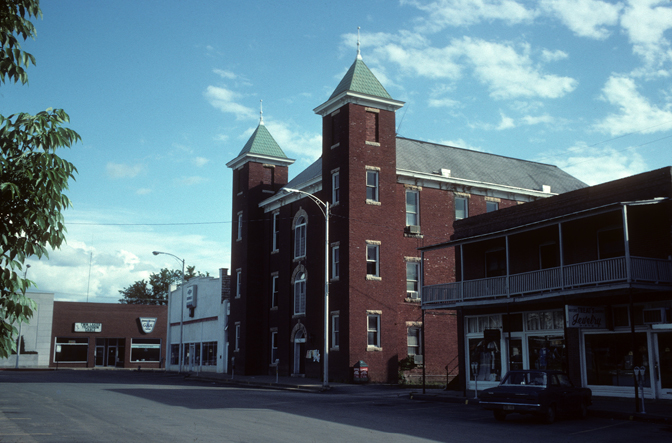
- Beaver Bridge Ozark Mountains Carroll County Courthouse, Western District in Eureka Springs Carroll County Courthouse, Eastern District in Berryville

- Location within the U.S. state of Arkansas
- Coordinates: 36°22′05″N 93°29′47″W
- Country: United States
- State: Arkansas
- Founded: November 1, 1833
- Named for: Charles Carroll
- Seat: Berryville and Eureka Springs
- Largest city: Berryville

Area
  - Total: 639 sq mi (1,660 km^{2})
  - Land: 630 sq mi (1,600 km^{2})
  - Water: 8.7 sq mi (23 km^{2}) 1.4%

Population (2020)
  - Total: 28,260
  - Estimate (2025): 29,263 ▲
  - Density: 45/sq mi (17/km^{2})
- Time zone: UTC−6 (Central)
  - Summer (DST): UTC−5 (CDT)
- Area code: 479 (Eureka Springs); 870 (Berryville)
- Congressional district: 3rd
- Website: carrollcounty.us

Carroll County is a county located in the U.S. state of Arkansas. As of the 2020 census, the population was 28,260. The county has two county seats, Berryville and Eureka Springs. Carroll County is Arkansas's 26th county, formed on November 1, 1833, and named after Charles Carroll, the last surviving signer of the United States Declaration of Independence.

== Geography ==
According to the U.S. Census Bureau, the county has a total area of 639 square miles (1,660 km^{2}), of which 630 square miles (1,600 km^{2}) is land and 8.7 square miles (23 km^{2}) (1.4%) is water.

=== Major highways ===
- U.S. Highway 62
  - U.S. Route 62 Spur
- U.S. Highway 412
- Arkansas Highway 21
- Arkansas Highway 23
- Arkansas Highway 103
- Arkansas Highway 143
- Arkansas Highway 187
- Arkansas Highway 221
- Arkansas Highway 311
- Arkansas Highway 980

=== Transit ===
- Jefferson Lines

=== Adjacent counties ===
- Stone County, Missouri (north)
- Taney County, Missouri (northeast)
- Boone County (east)
- Newton County (southeast)
- Madison County (south)
- Benton County (west)
- Barry County, Missouri (northwest)

== Demographics ==
Historical population
Census	Pop.	Note	%±
1840	2,844		—
1850	4,614		62.2%
1860	9,383		103.4%
1870	5,780		−38.4%
1880	13,337		130.7%
1890	17,288		29.6%
1900	18,848		9.0%
1910	16,829		−10.7%
1920	17,786		5.7%
1930	15,820		−11.1%
1940	14,737		−6.8%
1950	13,244		−10.1%
1960	11,284		−14.8%
1970	12,301		9.0%
1980	16,203		31.7%
1990	18,654		15.1%
2000	25,357		35.9%
2010	27,446		8.2%
2020	28,260		3.0%
2025 (est.)	29,263	▲	3.5%
U.S. Decennial Census; 1790–1960 1900–1990; 1990–2000 2010–2016

=== 2020 census ===
As of the 2020 census, the county had a population of 28,260. The median age was 44.8 years. 21.9% of residents were under the age of 18 and 23.6% of residents were 65 years of age or older. For every 100 females there were 97.7 males, and for every 100 females age 18 and over there were 96.4 males age 18 and over.

17.9% of residents lived in urban areas, while 82.1% lived in rural areas.

There were 11,727 households in the county, of which 26.1% had children under the age of 18 living in them. Of all households, 47.8% were married-couple households, 19.5% were households with a male householder and no spouse or partner present, and 25.9% were households with a female householder and no spouse or partner present. About 30.9% of all households were made up of individuals and 15.4% had someone living alone who was 65 years of age or older.

There were 13,853 housing units, of which 15.3% were vacant. Among occupied housing units, 70.1% were owner-occupied and 29.9% were renter-occupied. The homeowner vacancy rate was 1.8% and the rental vacancy rate was 7.6%.

Carroll County racial composition
Race	Percentage
White	77.7%
Black or African American	0.3%
American Indian and Alaska Native	1.3%
Asian	2.0%
Native Hawaiian and Pacific Islander	1.6%
Some other race	8.8%
Two or more races	8.3%
Hispanic or Latino (of any race)	15.2%

=== 2000 census ===
As of the 2000 census, there were 25,357 people, 10,189 households, and 7,111 families residing in the county. The population density was 40 people per square mile (15 people/km^{2}). There were 11,828 housing units at an average density of 19 units per square mile (7.3 units/km^{2}). The racial composition of the county was 93.63% White, 0.11% Black or African American, 0.88% Native American, 0.41% Asian, 0.08% Pacific Islander, 3.34% from other races, and 1.55% from two or more races. 9.74% of the population were Hispanic or Latino of any race. 10.03% reported speaking Spanish at home.

There were 10,189 households, out of which 29.20% had children under the age of 18 living with them, 57.10% were married couples living together, 8.60% had a female householder with no husband present, and 30.20% were non-families. 25.20% of all households were made up of individuals, and 10.30% had someone living alone, who was 65 years of age or older. The average household size was 2.47 and the average family size was 2.93.

In the county, the population was spread out, with 24.00% under the age of 18, 8.10% from 18 to 24, 26.20% from 25 to 44, 26.00% from 45 to 64, and 15.80% who were 65 years of age or older. The median age was 39 years. For every 100 females there were 97.40 males. For every 100 females age 18 and over, there were 95.30 males.

The median income for a household in the county was $27,924, and the median income for a family was $33,218. Males had a median income of $21,896 versus $18,159 for females. The per capita income for the county was $16,003. About 11.00% of families and 15.50% of the population were below the poverty line, including 20.70% of those under age 18 and 13.60% of those age 65 or over.

== Government and politics ==
The county government is a constitutional body granted specific powers by the Constitution of Arkansas and the Arkansas Code. The quorum court is the legislative branch of the county government and controls all spending and revenue collection. Representatives are called justices of the peace and are elected from county districts every even-numbered year. The number of districts in a county vary from nine to fifteen, and district boundaries are drawn by the county election commission. The Carroll County Quorum Court has eleven members. Presiding over quorum court meetings is the county judge, who serves as the chief operating officer of the county. The county judge is elected at-large and does not vote in quorum court business, although capable of vetoing quorum court decisions.

Carroll County, Arkansas Elected countywide officials
Position	Officeholder	Party
County Judge	David Writer	Republican
County Clerk	Connie T. Doss	Republican
Circuit Clerk	Sara Huffman	Republican
Sheriff	Daniel Klatt	Republican
Treasurer	Makita Williams	Republican
Collector	Krista Burnett	Republican
Assessor	Jeannie Davidson	Democratic
Coroner	David Slaton	Republican

The composition of the Quorum Court following the 2024 elections is 9 Republicans, 1 Democrat, and 1 Independent. Justices of the Peace (members) of the Quorum Court following the elections are:

- District 1: Jack Deaton (I) (position now VACANT)
- District 2: Stuart Bruce Wright (R) of Eureka Springs
- District 3: Harrie Farrow (D) of Eureka Springs
- District 4: Hunter Rivett (R) of Berryville
- District 5: Matt Phillips (R) of Berryville
- District 6: Craig Hicks (R) of Berryville
- District 7: Kellie Matt (R) of Eureka Springs
- District 8: Bobby James (R) of Green Forest
- District 9: Aaron Hall (R) of Green Forest
- District 10: Jerry King (R) of Green Forest
- District 11: Caroline Jane Roberts (R) of Alpena

Additionally, the townships of Carroll County are entitled to elect their own respective constables, as set forth by the Constitution of Arkansas. Constables are largely of historical significance as they were used to keep the peace in rural areas when travel was more difficult. The township constables as of the 2024 elections are:

- Central: Todd W. Summers (R)
- Northeast: Randy Langhover (R)
- Western: James Wallace (D)

The Eastern District (Berryville and Green Forest) is heavily Republican. The Western District (Eureka Springs and Beaver) tilts Democratic despite the fact that Holiday Island, a community with a large percentage of relocated snowbirds in the Western District, is overwhelmingly Republican.

In presidential elections, Carroll County has voted for the Democratic candidate only twice since 1952. It voted for Southerners Jimmy Carter in 1976, and Bill Clinton in 1992.

United States presidential election results for Carroll County, Arkansas
Year	Republican		Democratic		Third party(ies)	
Year	No.	%	No.	%	No.	%
1896	875	32.30%	1,790	66.08%	44	1.62%
1900	735	36.93%	1,205	60.55%	50	2.51%
1904	869	46.03%	925	48.99%	94	4.98%
1908	1,051	43.22%	1,295	53.25%	86	3.54%
1912	464	24.91%	919	49.33%	480	25.76%
1916	1,034	40.61%	1,512	59.39%	0	0.00%
1920	1,338	48.71%	1,344	48.93%	65	2.37%
1924	969	38.39%	1,421	56.30%	134	5.31%
1928	1,757	53.05%	1,540	46.50%	15	0.45%
1932	758	25.77%	2,150	73.10%	33	1.12%
1936	940	36.22%	1,649	63.55%	6	0.23%
1940	1,081	40.23%	1,604	59.69%	2	0.07%
1944	1,176	44.55%	1,464	55.45%	0	0.00%
1948	1,525	41.35%	2,032	55.10%	131	3.55%
1952	2,752	64.63%	1,493	35.06%	13	0.31%
1956	2,310	58.04%	1,651	41.48%	19	0.48%
1960	2,615	65.95%	1,301	32.81%	49	1.24%
1964	2,105	51.22%	2,005	48.78%	0	0.00%
1968	2,596	51.22%	1,298	25.61%	1,174	23.16%
1972	3,565	70.09%	1,401	27.55%	120	2.36%
1976	2,804	42.17%	3,791	57.01%	55	0.83%
1980	4,273	55.29%	2,977	38.52%	478	6.19%
1984	5,041	68.21%	2,263	30.62%	86	1.16%
1988	4,553	62.77%	2,632	36.29%	68	0.94%
1992	3,535	39.91%	3,769	42.55%	1,553	17.53%
1996	3,957	44.85%	3,689	41.81%	1,177	13.34%
2000	5,556	57.94%	3,595	37.49%	439	4.58%
2004	6,184	59.00%	4,161	39.70%	136	1.30%
2008	6,083	57.50%	4,172	39.44%	324	3.06%
2012	6,125	60.15%	3,696	36.30%	362	3.55%
2016	6,786	63.08%	3,342	31.07%	630	5.86%
2020	7,424	62.93%	4,023	34.10%	350	2.97%
2024	7,470	64.74%	3,812	33.04%	256	2.22%

== Communities ==
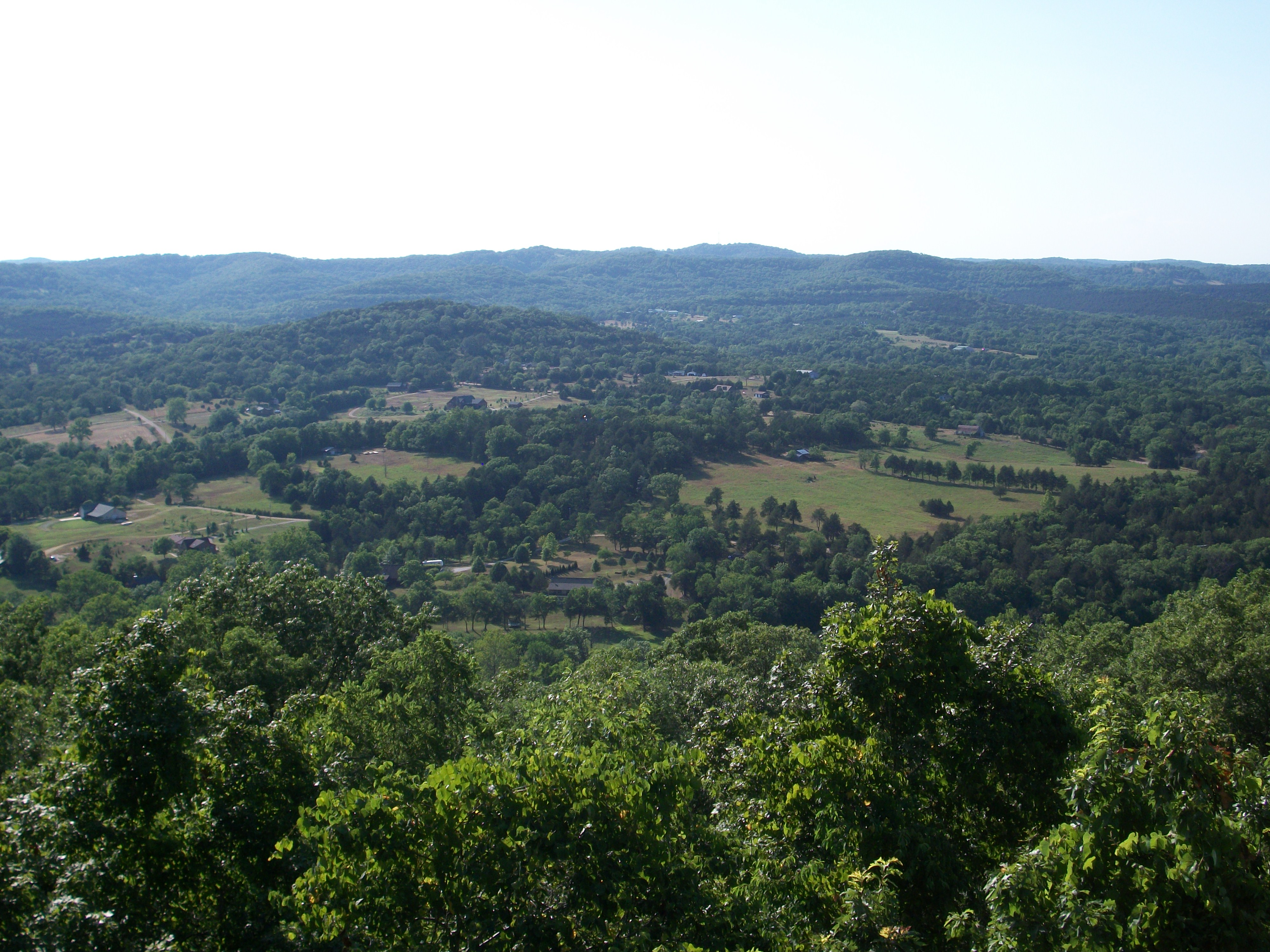
View from a scenic outlook on US 62 west of Eureka Springs.

=== Cities ===
- Berryville (county seat)
- Eureka Springs (county seat)
- Green Forest
- Holiday Island

=== Towns ===
- Alpena (partly in Boone County)
- Beaver
- Blue Eye
- Oak Grove

=== Other unincorporated communities ===
- Carrollton

Rudd Osage

=== Townships ===
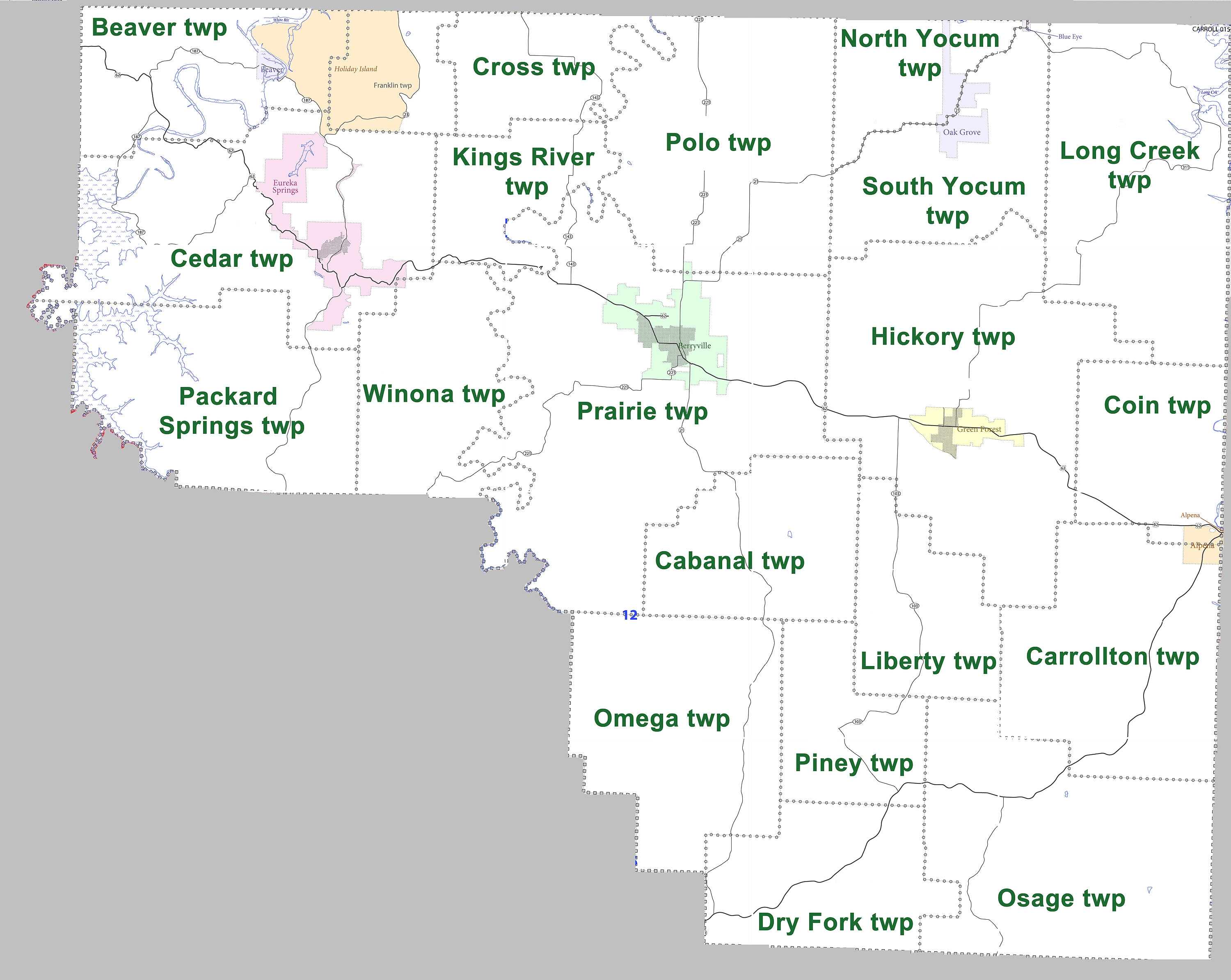
Townships in Carroll County, Arkansas as of 2010

Townships in Arkansas are the divisions of a county. Each township includes unincorporated areas; some may have incorporated cities or towns within part of their boundaries. Arkansas townships have limited purposes in modern times. However, the United States census does list Arkansas population based on townships (sometimes referred to as "county subdivisions" or "minor civil divisions"). Townships are also of value for historical purposes in terms of genealogical research. Each town or city is within one or more townships in an Arkansas county based on census maps and publications. The townships of Carroll County are listed below; listed in parentheses are the cities, towns, and/or census-designated places that are fully or partially inside the township.

Township	FIPS code	ANSI code (GNIS ID)	Population center(s)	Pop. (2010)	Pop. density (/mi^{2})	Pop. density (/km^{2})	Land area (mi^{2})	Land area (km^{2})	Water area (mi^{2})	Water area (km^{2})	Geographic coordinates
Beaver	05-90195	00066889	Beaver, Holiday Island	1787	75.33	29.09	23.722	61.44	1.260	3.263	36.470907°N 93.801892°W
Cabanal	05-90570	00066890		381	16.59	6.41	22.966	59.48	0.013	0.03367	36.298844°N 93.526617°W
Carrollton	05-90681	00066891	Alpena	716	20.04	7.74	35.734	92.55	0.008	0.02072	36.243979°N 93.339996°W
Cedar	05-90708	00066892	Eureka Springs	3575	78.90	30.46	45.312	117.4	3.260	8.443	36.404190°N 93.784428°W
Coin	05-90891	00066894	Alpena	655	34.13	13.18	19.191	49.70	0.037	0.09583	36.322905°N 93.328357°W
Cross	05-90981	00066895		284	18.52	7.15	15.335	39.72	0.023	0.05957	36.470604°N 93.626448°W
Dry Fork	05-91143	00066897		292	12.55	4.85	23.263	60.25	0	0.000	36.148170°N 93.485237°W
Franklin	05-91338	00066898	Holiday Island	1269	119.28	46.04	10.639	27.55	0	0.000	36.473124°N 93.713274°W
Hickory	05-91692	00066899	Green Forest	4977	87.20	33.67	57.078	147.8	0	0.000	36.348254°N 93.423987°W
King's River	05-92052	00066900		625	41.72	16.11	14.980	38.80	0	0.000	36.428216°N 93.650539°W
Liberty	05-92163	00066901		158	8.60	3.32	18.368	47.57	0	0.000	36.261714°N 93.446885°W
Long Creek	05-92271	00066902		614	14.33	5.53	42.834	110.9	0.971	2.515	36.428948°N 93.334785°W
North Yocum	05-92727	00066903	Blue Eye, Oak Grove	314	24.15	9.32	13.004	33.68	0.017	0.04403	36.473431°N 93.454596°W
Omega	05-92763	00066904		489	14.06	5.43	34.778	90.07	0	0.000	36.213409°N 93.564238°W
Osage	05-92769	00066905		418	9.25	3.57	45.196	117.1	0.019	0.04921	36.164906°N 93.376019°W
Packard Springs	05-92811	00066906		735	22.44	8.66	32.761	84.85	2.944	7.625	36.340831°N 93.804230°W
Piney	05-92898	00066907		226	13.99	5.40	16.150	41.83	0	0.000	36.214639°N 93.482882°W
Polo	05-93522	00069621	Berryville	1224	29.90	11.55	40.932	106.0	0.006	0.01554	36.443519°N 93.544485°W
Prairie	05-92982	00066909	Berryville	7555	106.85	41.25	70.706	183.1	0.144	0.3730	36.341052°N 93.585079°W
South Yocum	05-93444	00066910	Blue Eye, Oak Grove	649	29.92	10.78	23.247	60.21	0	0.000	36.441510°N 93.431854°W
Winona	05-94101	00066911	Eureka Springs	453	18.96	7.32	23.889	61.87	0	0.000	36.344531°N 93.697021°W
Source: U.S. Census Bureau

== See also ==
- List of lakes in Carroll County, Arkansas
- National Register of Historic Places listings in Carroll County, Arkansas
