= Carrollton Township, Carroll County, Arkansas =

Carrollton Township
- Township
- Location in Arkansas
- Coordinates: 36°14′38.32″N 93°20′23.99″W
- Country: United States
- State: Arkansas
- County: Carroll

Area
  - Total: 35.742 sq mi (92.57 km^{2})
  - Land: 35.734 sq mi (92.55 km^{2})
  - Water: 0.008 sq mi (0.021 km^{2})
- Elevation: 1,224 ft (373 m)

Population (2010)
  - Total: 716
  - Density: 20.04/sq mi (7.74/km^{2})
- Time zone: UTC-6 (CST)
  - Summer (DST): UTC-5 (CDT)
- Zip Code: 72611 (Alpena)
- Area code: 870
- GNIS feature ID: 66891

Carrollton Township is one of twenty-one current townships in Carroll County, Arkansas, USA. As of the 2010 census, its total population was 716.

Carrollton Township was formed prior to 1870; the exact date is unknown since county records were lost.

== Geography ==
According to the United States Census Bureau, Carrollton Township covers an area of 35.742 square miles (92.57 km^{2}); 35.734 square miles (92.55 km^{2}) of land and 0.008 square miles (0.021 km^{2}) of water.

=== Cities, towns, and villages ===
- Alpena (part)
- Carrollton (unincorporated)
