= Oak Grove, Carroll County, Arkansas =

Oak Grove, Arkansas
- Town
- Location of Oak Grove in Carroll County, Arkansas.
- Coordinates: 36°27′50″N 93°25′49″W
- Country: United States
- State: Arkansas
- County: Carroll

Government
  - Mayor: Robert Fairweather

Area
  - Total: 2.76 sq mi (7.15 km^{2})
  - Land: 2.76 sq mi (7.15 km^{2})
  - Water: 0 sq mi (0.00 km^{2})
- Elevation: 1,322 ft (403 m)

Population (2020)
  - Total: 386
  - Estimate (2025): 396 ▲
  - Density: 139.9/sq mi (54.01/km^{2})
- Time zone: UTC-6 (Central (CST))
  - Summer (DST): UTC-5 (CDT)
- ZIP code: 72660
- Area code: 870
- FIPS code: 05-50810
- GNIS feature ID: 2407016
- Website: http://oakgrovear.com/

Oak Grove is a town in Carroll County, Arkansas, United States. The population was 386 at the 2020 census. The population estimate is 285 as of 2024.

== Geography ==
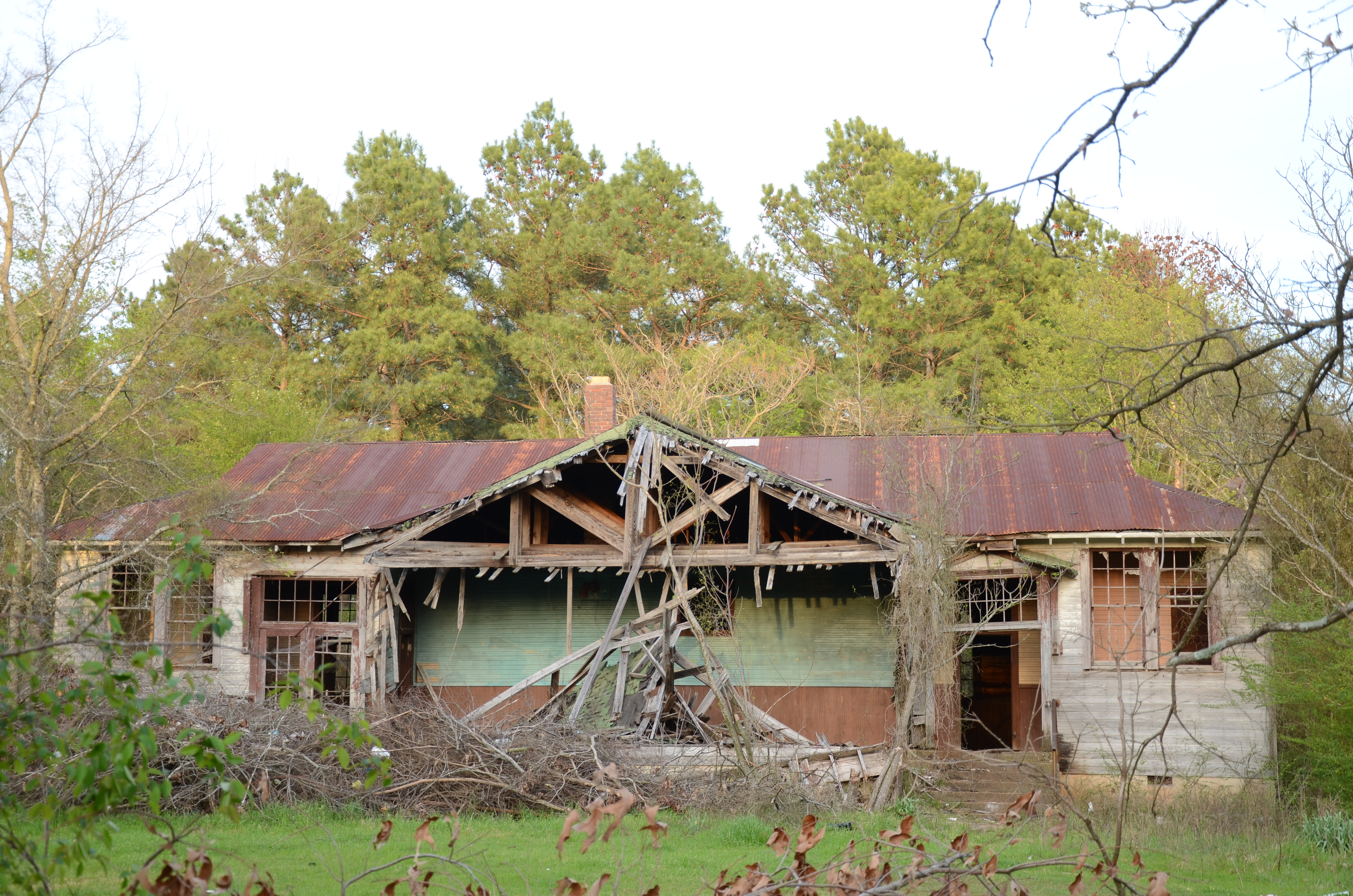
Oak Grove Rosenwald School

According to the United States Census Bureau, the town has a total area of 2.5 square miles (6.6 km^{2}), all land.

=== List of highways ===
- Arkansas Highway 21
- Arkansas Highway 103

== Demographics ==
Historical population
Census	Pop.	Note	%±
1960	151		—
1970	236		56.3%
1980	265		12.3%
1990	231		−12.8%
2000	376		62.8%
2010	369		−1.9%
2020	386		4.6%
2025 (est.)	396		2.6%
U.S. Decennial Census

As of the census of 2000, there were 376 people, 145 households, and 108 families residing in the town. The population density was 56.5/km^{2} (146/mi^{2}). There were 171 housing units at an average density of 25.7 units/km^{2} (67 units/mi^{2}). The racial makeup of the town was 96.28% White, 1.60% Native American, 0.53% Asian, and 1.60% from two or more races.

There were 145 households, out of which 37.2% had children under the age of 18 living with them, 58.6% were married couples living together, 6.2% had a female householder with no husband present, and 25.5% were non-families. 24.1% of all households were made up of individuals, and 13.1% had someone living alone who was 65 years of age or older. The average household size was 2.59 and the average family size was 3.06.

In the town, the population was spread out, with 28.5% under the age of 18, 9.8% from 18 to 24, 22.3% from 25 to 44, 25.3% from 45 to 64, and 14.1% who were 65 years of age or older. The median age was 37 years. For every 100 females, there were 89.9 males. For every 100 females age 18 and over, there were 92.1 males.

The median income for a household in the town was $25,625, and the median income for a family was $28,750. Males had a median income of $24,444 versus $18,958 for females. The per capita income for the town was $15,364. About 13.0% of families and 13.9% of the population were below the poverty line, including 20.2% of those under age 18 and none of those age 65 or over.
