= Rolén =

Rolén or Rolen is a given name and surname. Notable people with the name include:

- Artur Rolén, Swedish actor
- Olle Rolén (born 1944), Swedish alpine skier
- Scott Rolen (born 1975), American baseball player
- Rolen Paulino, Filipino politician

== Other ==
- Leslie-Rolen House, Historic house in Arkansas, United States
