= Campbell Post Office–Kuykendall General Store =

- U.S. National Register of Historic Places
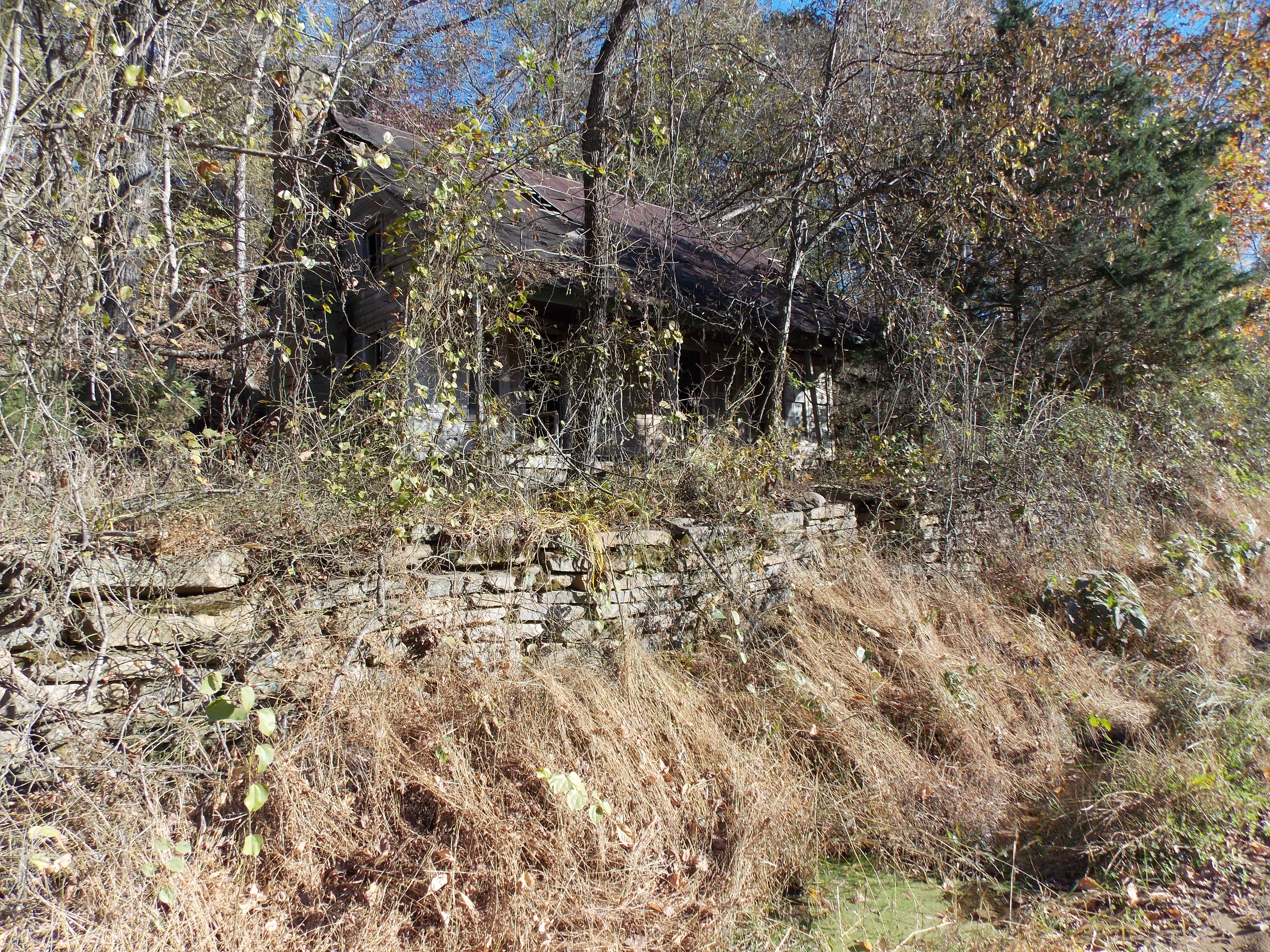

- Location within Arkansas Location within the United States
- Nearest city: Oxley, Arkansas
- Coordinates: 35°52′19″N 92°28′35″W
- Area: less than one acre
- Built: 1900
- Architectural style: Greek Revival, Plain Traditional
- MPS: Searcy County MPS
- NRHP reference No.: 93001364
- Added to NRHP: December 2, 1993

The Campbell Post Office–Kuykendall General Store is a historic residential–commercial building in rural Searcy County, Arkansas. It is located on County Road 73, northwest of Oxley, Arkansas. It is a single-story wood-frame structure with modest Greek Revival styling. Its construction date was long thought to be 1920, but it was more likely built around 1900, still an extremely late date for the Greek Revival. It was converted into a post office and general store in the 1920s by Henry Kuykendall.

The building was listed on the National Register of Historic Places in 1993.

== See also ==
- National Register of Historic Places listings in Searcy County, Arkansas
- List of United States post offices
