= Bank of Marshall Building =

- U.S. National Register of Historic Places
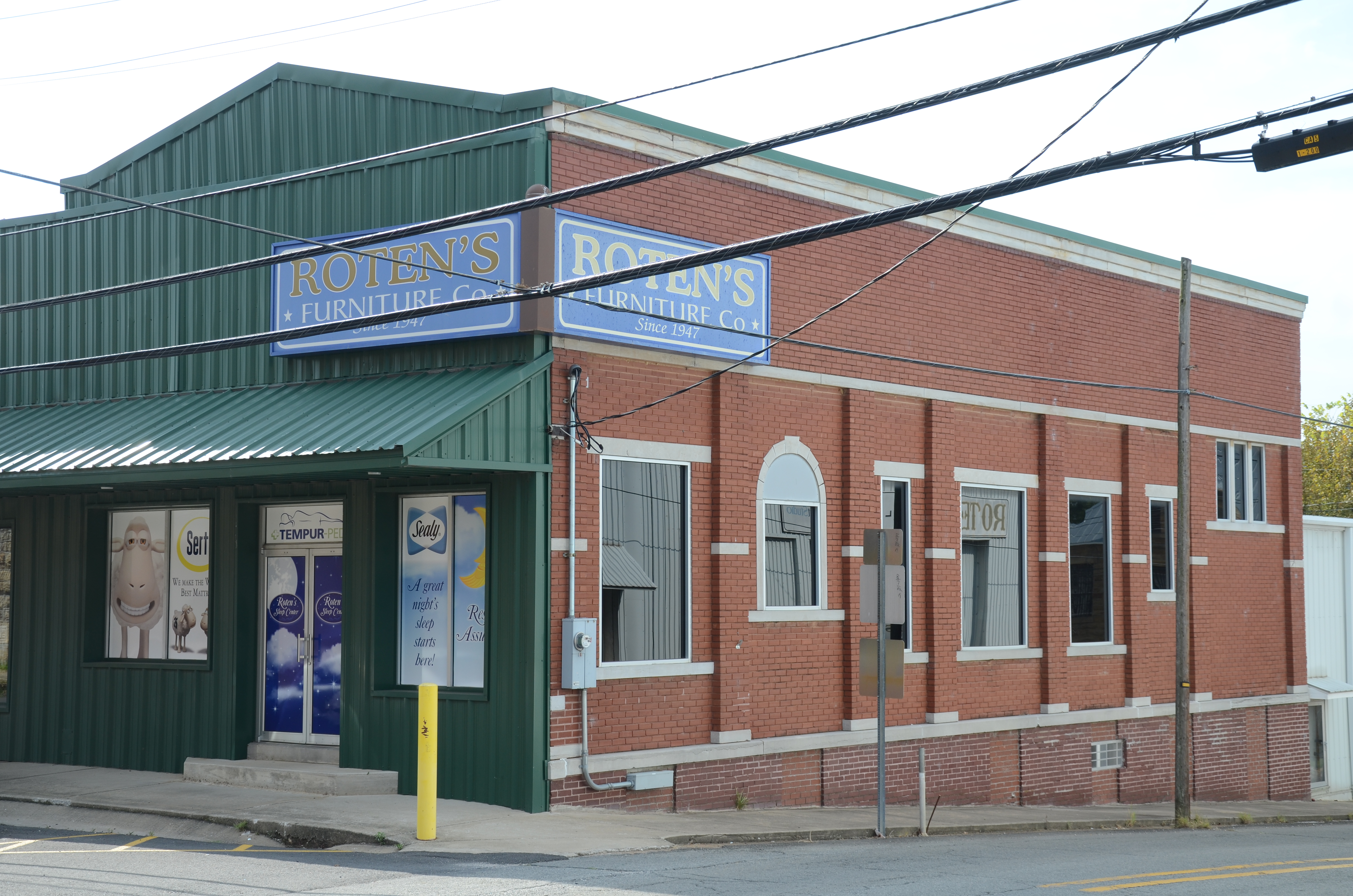

- Location within Arkansas Location within the United States
- Location: Jct. of Main and Center Sts., SE corner, Marshall, Arkansas
- Coordinates: 35°54′33″N 92°37′53″W
- Area: less than one acre
- Built: 1913
- Built by: Jasper Treece
- Architectural style: Colonial Revival
- MPS: Searcy County MPS
- NRHP reference No.: 93000974
- Added to NRHP: October 4, 1993

The Bank of Marshall Building is a historic commercial building at the southeast corner of Main and Center Streets in downtown Marshall, Arkansas. It is a 1 1/2-story brick masonry structure, built in 1913-14 by Jasper Treece, a local builder, in a vernacular Colonial Revival style. Its front facade is three bays wide, with an arched window bay to the left of the central entrance, and a square window bay to the right. A narrow band of windows is set in the half story, highlighted by bands of stone acting as sills and lintels. The bank was established in 1914 and struggled during the Great Depression, because, according to residents, it was unable to pay its debts.

The building was listed on the National Register of Historic Places in 1993.

== See also ==
- National Register of Historic Places listings in Searcy County, Arkansas
