= J.C. Miller House =

Historic house in Arkansas, United States

- J. C. Miller House
- U.S. National Register of Historic Places
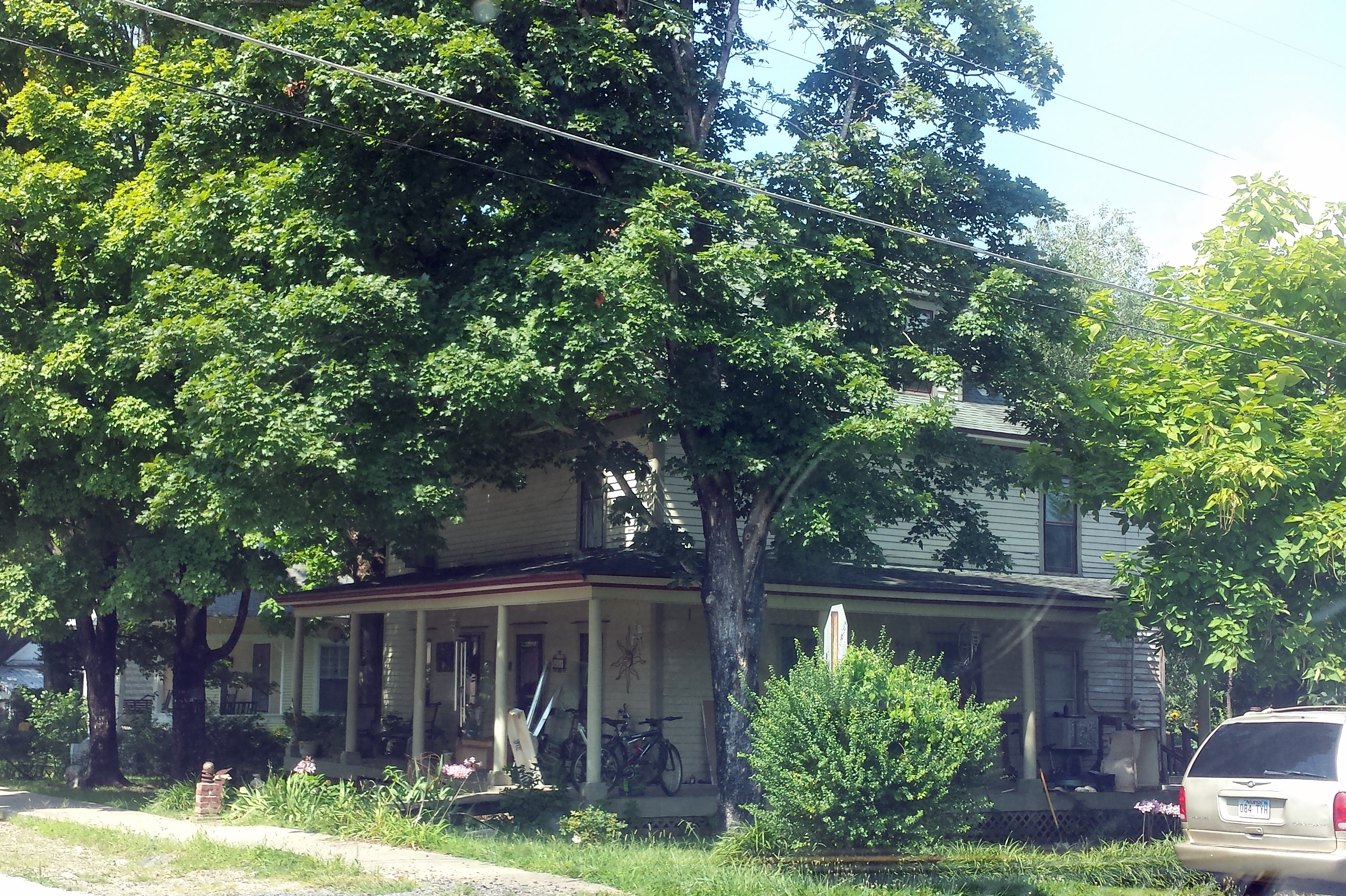

- Location within Arkansas Location within the United States
- Location: Jct. of Oak and High Sts., NW corner, Leslie, Arkansas
- Coordinates: 35°49′56″N 92°33′34″W
- Area: less than one acre
- Built: 1905
- Architectural style: American Foursquare
- MPS: Searcy County MPS
- NRHP reference No.: 93001370
- Added to NRHP: December 2, 1993

The J.C. Miller House is a historic house at Oak and High Streets in Leslie, Arkansas. It is a tall 2 1/2-story wood-frame structure in the American Foursquare style, with a hip roof pierced by hip-roofed dormers, and a single-story porch that wraps around two sides. The construction date of the house is not known, but its first known occupant, J.C. Miller, was living in it in the 1920s. It is one of Searcy County's best examples of early-20th century American Foursquare design.

The house was listed on the National Register of Historic Places in 1993.

== See also ==
- National Register of Historic Places listings in Searcy County, Arkansas
