= Zeb Ferguson House =

Historic house in Arkansas, United States

- U.S. National Register of Historic Places
- Location within Arkansas Location within the United States
- Location: US 65, Marshall, Arkansas
- Coordinates: 35°54′39″N 92°37′51″W
- Area: less than one acre
- Architect: Zeb Ferguson, Doc Treat
- Architectural style: Plain Traditional
- MPS: Searcy County MPS
- NRHP reference No.: 93000968
- Added to NRHP: October 4, 1993

The Zeb Ferguson House is a historic house on the north side of United States Route 65 in Marshall, Arkansas. It is a single-story structure, built out of rough-cut sandstone, with simulated quoining at the corners and openings in brick. It has a hip roof with two cross-gables, and exposed rafter ends under the eaves. The south-facing front has a hip-roof porch supported by three square columns set on brick piers. The house was built about 1928 by Doc Treat and Zeb Ferguson for the latter. Ferguson was a prominent local businessman. The house they built is one of the finest examples in Marshall of Ozark stone architecture.

The house was listed on the National Register of Historic Places in 1993.

== See also ==
- Ferguson Gas Station, also built and owned by Zeb Ferguson
- National Register of Historic Places listings in Searcy County, Arkansas
