= T.M. Ferguson House =

Historic house in Arkansas, United States

- T. M. Ferguson House
- U.S. National Register of Historic Places
- Location within Arkansas Location within the United States
- Location: Canaan St., Marshall, Arkansas
- Coordinates: 35°54′29″N 92°38′5″W
- Area: less than one acre
- Architect: T.M. Ferguson
- Architectural style: Plain Traditional
- MPS: Searcy County MPS
- NRHP reference No.: 93000972
- Added to NRHP: October 4, 1993

The T.M. Ferguson House is a historic house on Canaan Street in Marshall, Arkansas. It is a single-story wood-frame structure, with a hip roof, clapboard siding, and two interior brick chimneys. A porch extends across part of the front, supported by a variety of columns, including some Victorian-style turned posts. The house was built between 1900 and 1903 by T.M. Ferguson, and is of local architectural significance for its vernacular hip roof.

The house was listed on the National Register of Historic Places in 1993.

== See also ==
- National Register of Historic Places listings in Searcy County, Arkansas
