= Bromley-Mills-Treece House =

Historic house in Arkansas, United States

- U.S. National Register of Historic Places
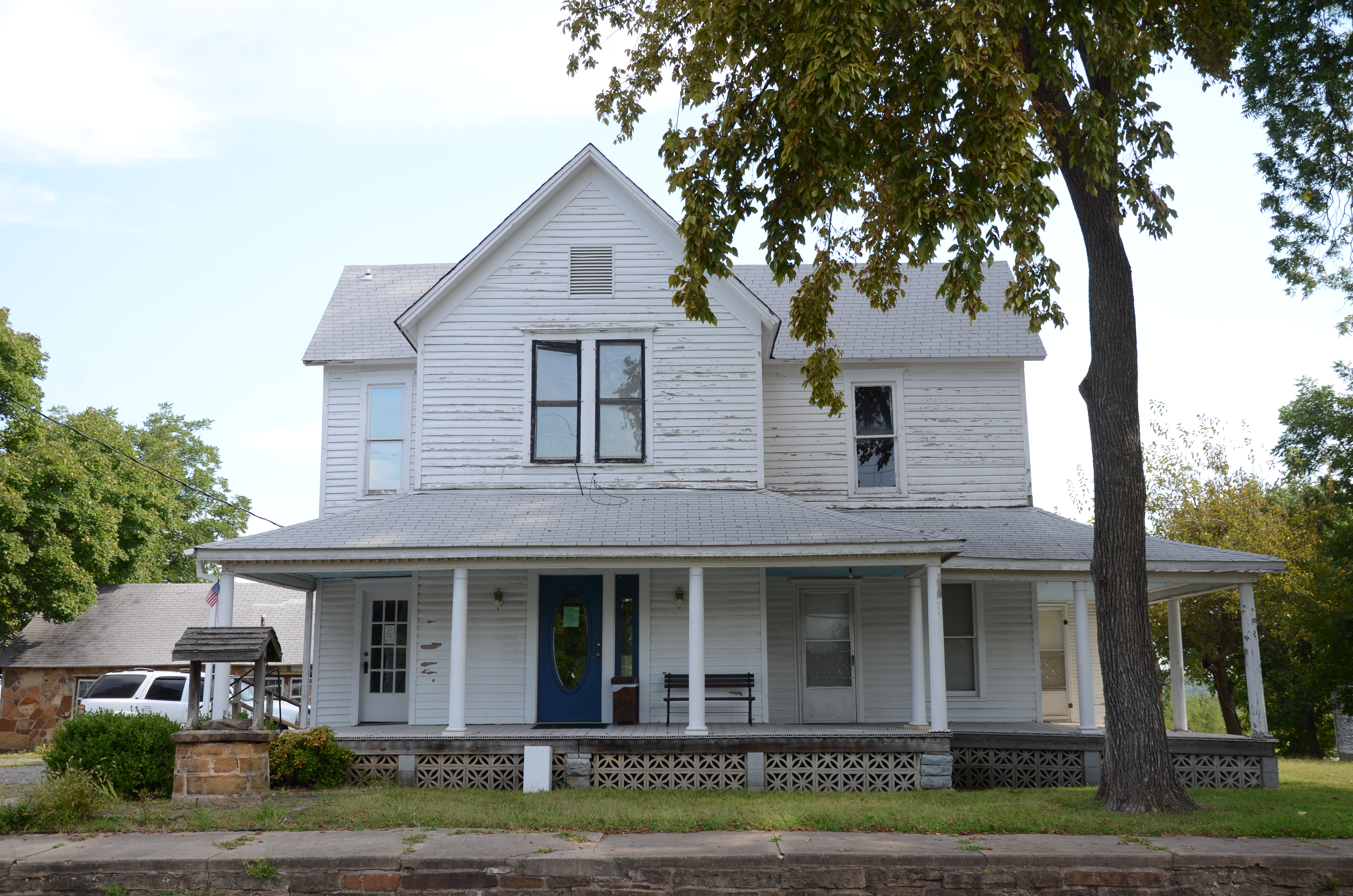

- Location within Arkansas Location within the United States
- Location: Main St., Marshall, Arkansas
- Coordinates: 35°54′32″N 92°37′43″W
- Area: less than one acre
- Built by: J.N. Bromley
- Architectural style: Colonial Revival
- MPS: Searcy County MPS
- NRHP reference No.: 93000966
- Added to NRHP: October 4, 1993

The Bromley-Mills-Treece House is a historic house on Main Street in Marshall, Arkansas. It is a 2 1/2-story wood-frame structure, with a cross-gable configuration, clapboard siding, two interior brick chimneys, and a concrete foundation. A single-story porch wraps around two sides of the house, supported by columns on stone piers, with decorative latticework between the bays. Built in 1905, the house is a good example of a well-preserved vernacular structure with minimal Colonial Revival styling (in this case, the porch).

The house was listed on the National Register of Historic Places in 1993.

== See also ==
- National Register of Historic Places listings in Searcy County, Arkansas
