= Noah Bryan Store =

- Bryan, Noah, Store
- U.S. National Register of Historic Places
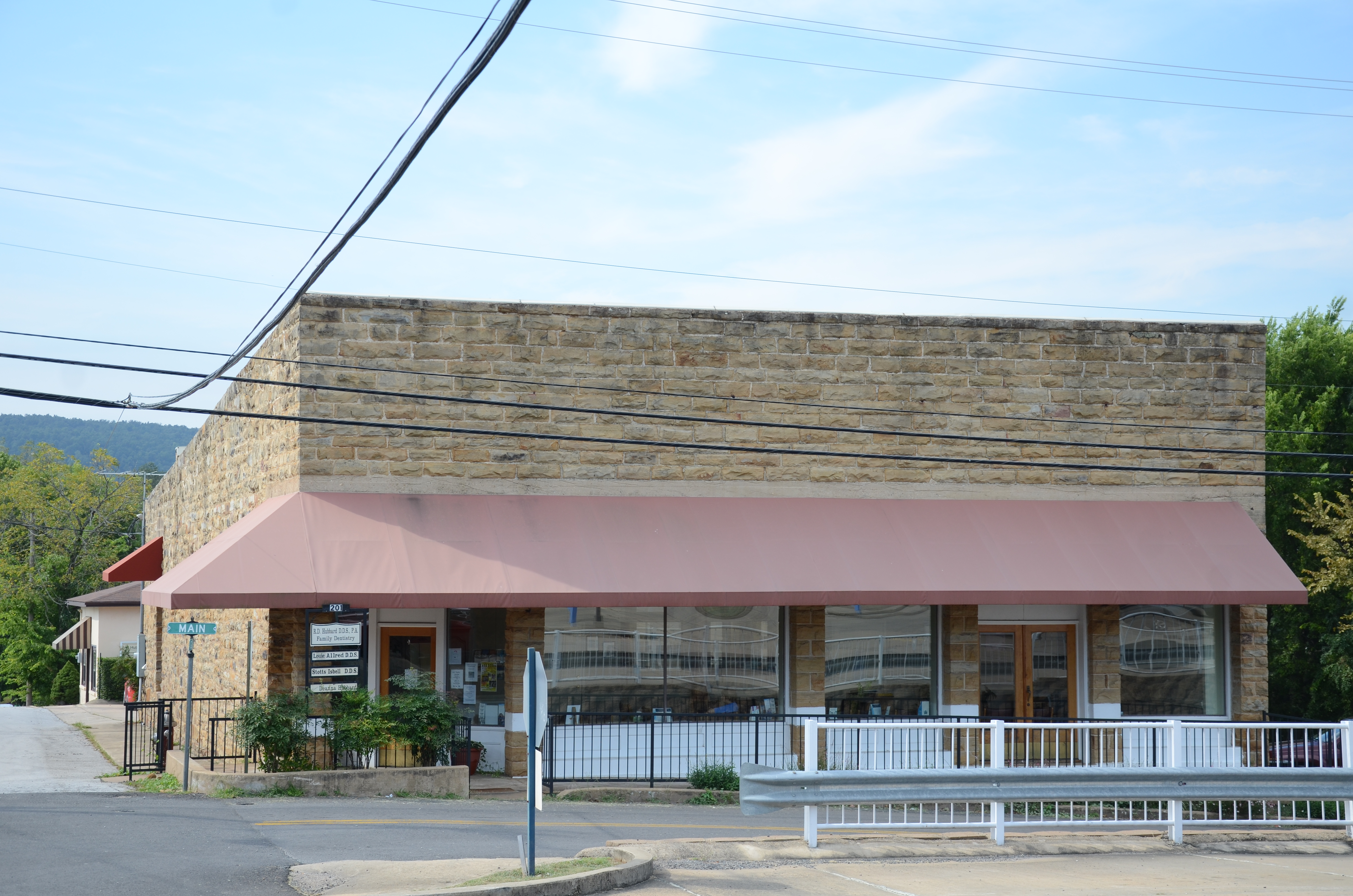

- Location within Arkansas Location within the United States
- Location: SW corner of Glade and Main Sts., Marshall, Arkansas
- Coordinates: 35°54′33″N 92°37′56″W
- Area: less than one acre
- Built: 1926
- Built by: Bob Hardin
- Architect: Taylor Campbell
- MPS: Searcy County MPS
- NRHP reference No.: 93000760
- Added to NRHP: August 18, 1993

The Noah Bryan Store is a historic commercial building at the southwest corner of Glade and Main Streets in Marshall, Arkansas. It is a single-story fieldstone structure, built in a distinctive Ozark regional style in which quarry-faced stone is set at differing depths to create a rusticated and textured surface. It was built in 1926 by Bob Hardin, a local builder, for Noah Bryan, who operated a retail store on the premises until the Great Depression.

The building was listed on the National Register of Historic Places in 1993.

== See also ==
- National Register of Historic Places listings in Searcy County, Arkansas
