= J.M. McCall House =

Historic house in Arkansas, United States

- J. M. McCall House
- U.S. National Register of Historic Places
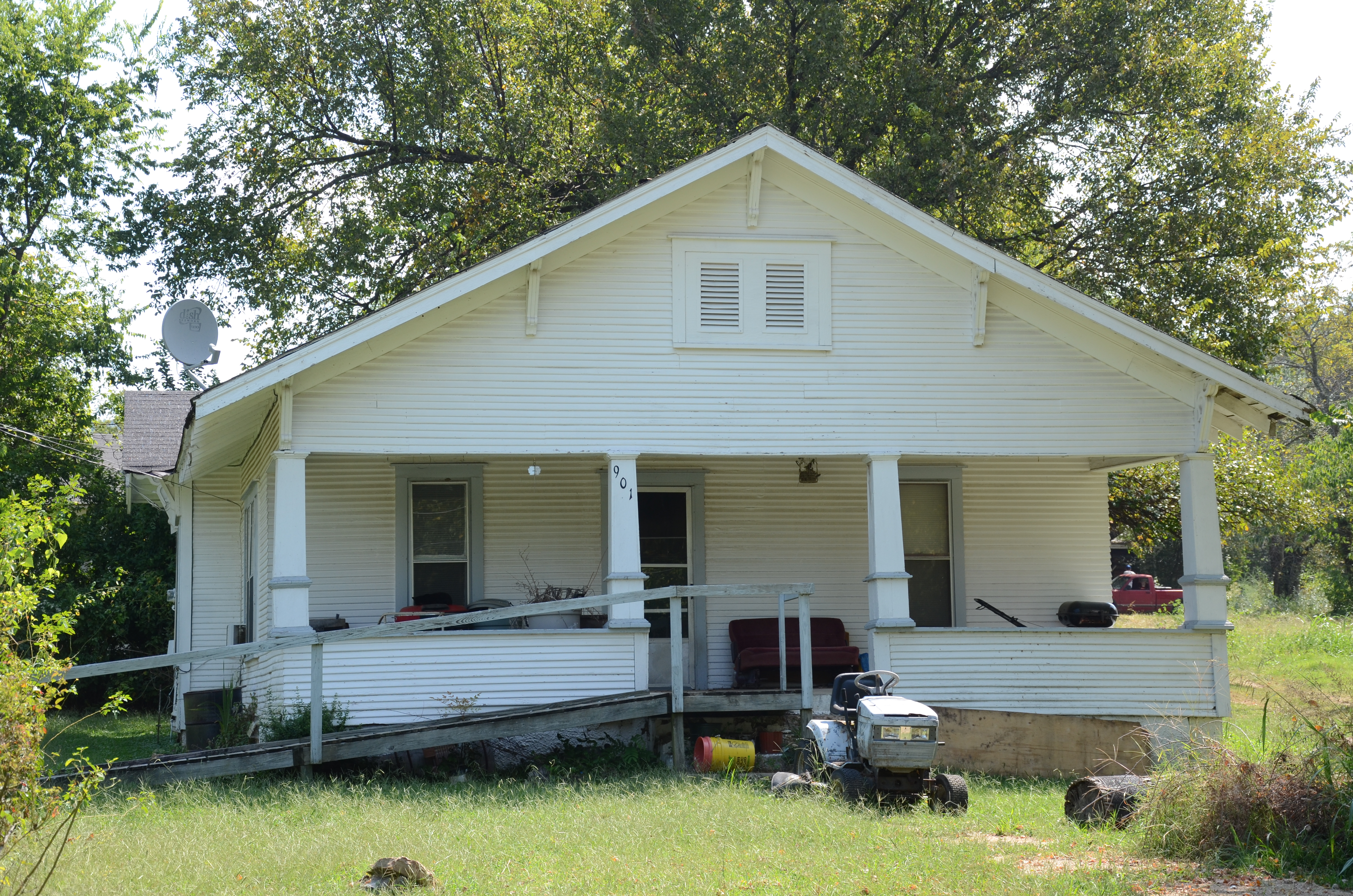

- Location within Arkansas Location within the United States
- Location: Spring St., Marshall, Arkansas
- Coordinates: 35°54′18″N 92°37′46″W
- Area: less than one acre
- Architectural style: Craftsman
- MPS: Searcy County MPS
- NRHP reference No.: 93000970
- Added to NRHP: October 4, 1993

The J.M. McCall House is a historic house on Spring Street in Marshall, Arkansas. It is a single-story wood-frame structure, with a gable roof, walls finished in novelty siding, and a stuccoed foundation. The roof eaves have exposed rafter ends in the Craftsman style, and the front porch (facing west) is recessed under the roof, supported by four tapered square posts. Built about 1910, it is a well-preserved local example of Craftsman architecture.

The house was listed on the National Register of Historic Places in 1993.

== See also ==
- National Register of Historic Places listings in Searcy County, Arkansas
