= Anthony Luna House =

Historic house in Arkansas, United States

- U.S. National Register of Historic Places
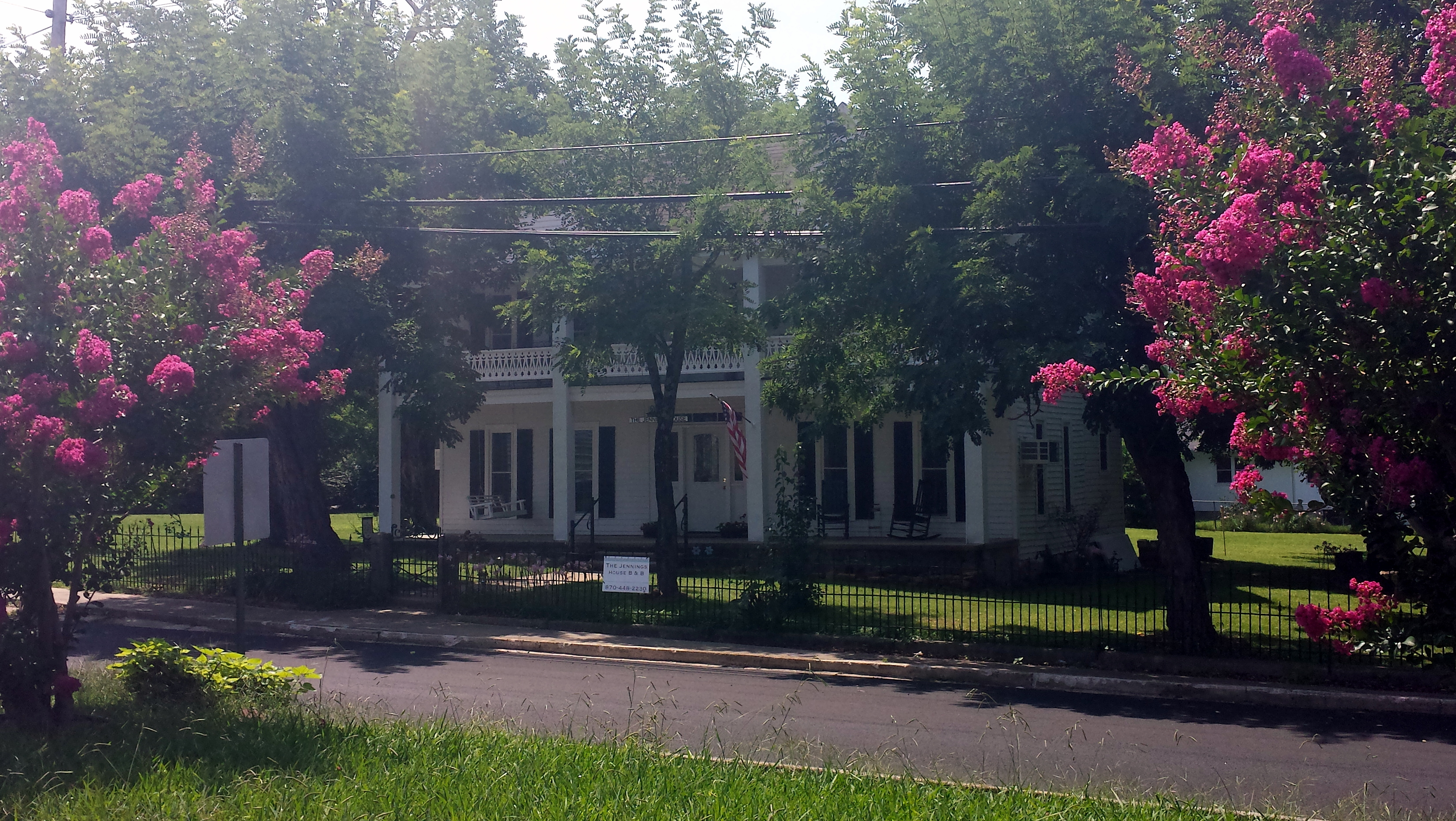

- Location within Arkansas Location within the United States
- Location: Jct. of Main and Spring Sts., SW corner, Marshall, Arkansas
- Coordinates: 35°54′33″N 92°37′50″W
- Area: less than one acre
- Built: 1891
- Architect: D.J. Thomas
- Architectural style: Folk Victorian
- MPS: Searcy County MPS
- NRHP reference No.: 93000975
- Added to NRHP: October 4, 1993

The Anthony Luna House is a historic house at the southwest corner of Main and Spring Streets in Marshall, Arkansas. It is a two-story wood-frame structure, with an L-shaped plan, covered by a cross-gable roof, weatherboard siding, and resting on a stone foundation. Its front facade is covered by a two-story porch, supported by square columns, and featuring an intricate jigsawn balustrade. There are two front-facing gable dormers, which, instead of windows, have a star-in-circle design in the gable. The house was built in 1891 for Anthony Luna, then the sheriff of Searcy County.

The house was listed on the National Register of Historic Places in 1993.

== See also ==
- National Register of Historic Places listings in Searcy County, Arkansas
