= Dr. Sam G. Daniel House =

Historic house in Arkansas, United States

- U.S. National Register of Historic Places
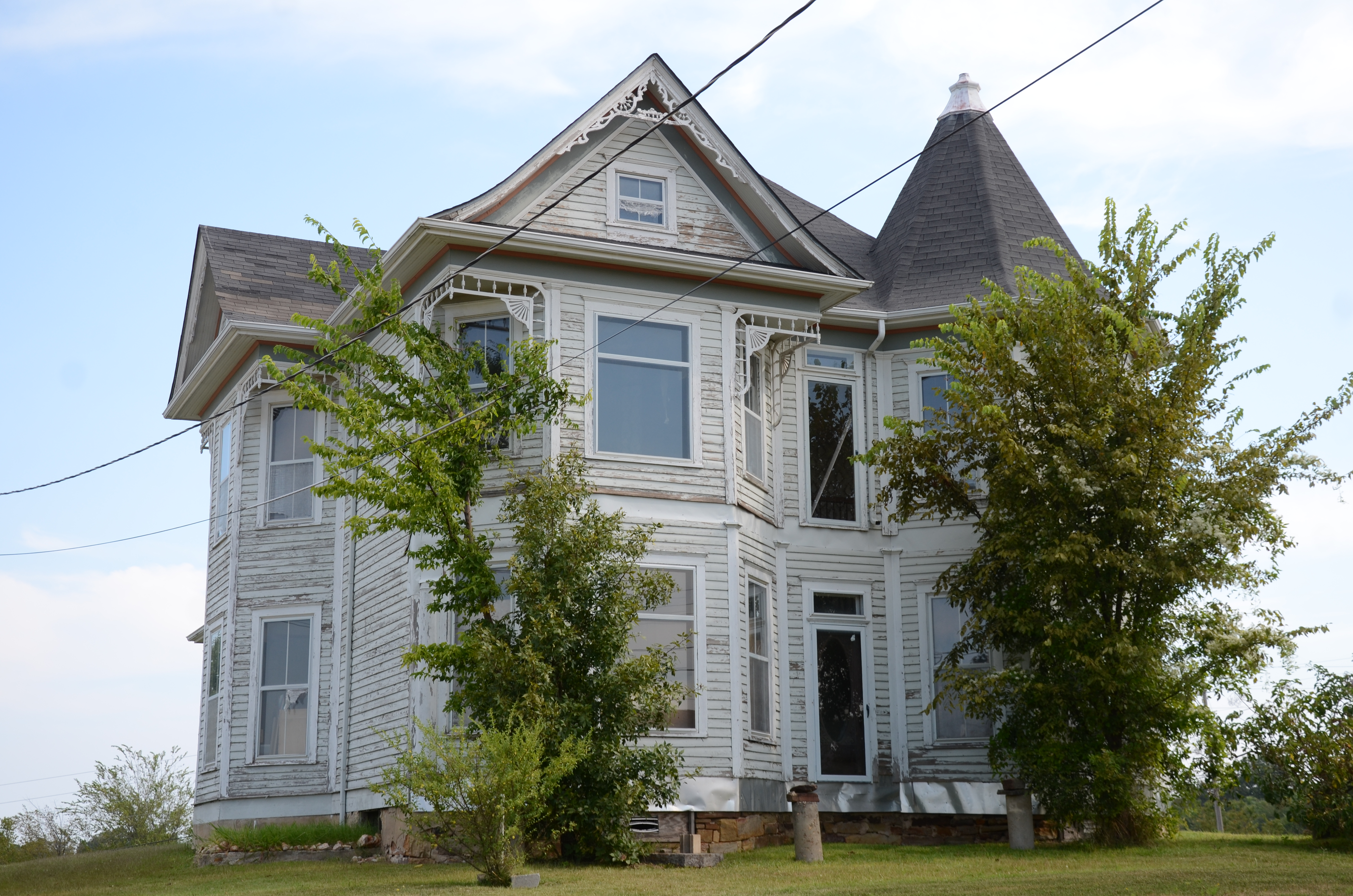

- Location within Arkansas Location within the United States
- Location: N side of Nome St., one block W of Courthouse Square, Marshall, Arkansas
- Coordinates: 35°54′36″N 92°37′57″W
- Area: less than one acre
- Built: 1902
- Built by: Mose McCall, Fred Ziegler
- Architect: Shelley Armitage
- Architectural style: Queen Anne
- MPS: Searcy County MPS
- NRHP reference No.: 93000759
- Added to NRHP: August 18, 1993

The Dr. Sam G. Daniel House is a historic house on the north side of Nome Street, one block west of the courthouse in Marshall, Arkansas. It is a two-story wood-frame structure, with a hip roof and clapboard siding. It has a projecting gabled section at the left of its front facade, and a polygonal turreted section on the right side, with a single-story porch in front. The house was built in 1902-03 for Dr. Sam Daniel.

The house was listed on the National Register of Historic Places in 1993.

== See also ==
- National Register of Historic Places listings in Searcy County, Arkansas
