= Columbus Hatchett House =

Historic house in Arkansas, United States

- U.S. National Register of Historic Places
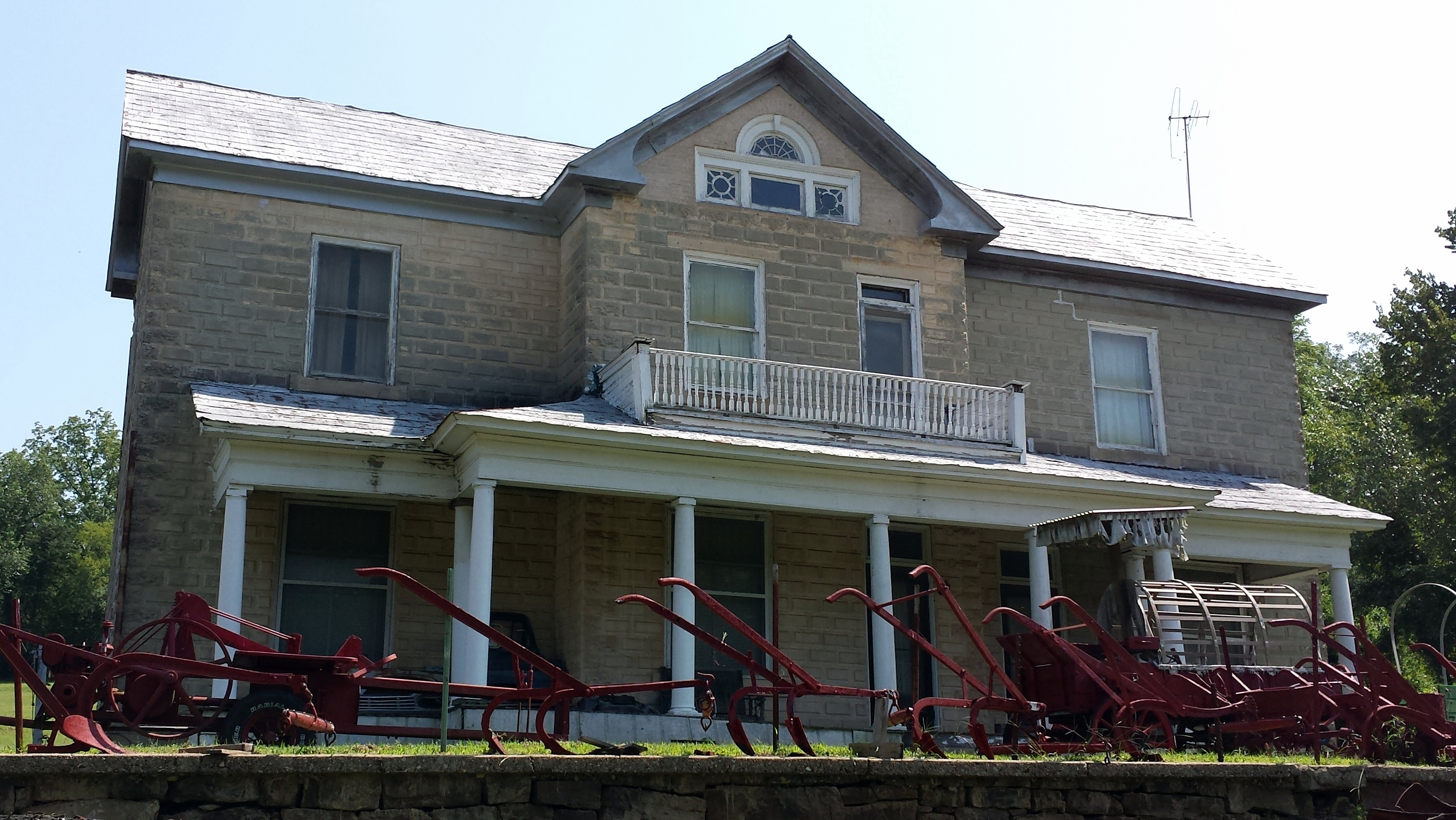

- Location within Arkansas Location within the United States
- Location: N side of jct. of Main and Hazel Sts., Leslie, Arkansas
- Coordinates: 35°49′40″N 92°33′26″W
- Area: less than one acre
- Architect: Multiple
- Architectural style: Colonial Revival
- MPS: Searcy County MPS
- NRHP reference No.: 93000756
- Added to NRHP: August 18, 1993

The Columbus Hatchett House is a historic house at the northern corner of Main and Hazel Streets in Leslie, Arkansas. It is a large two-story structure, fashioned out of rusticated concrete blocks. It has vernacular Colonial Revival details, including egg-and-dart moldings above the window lintels, concrete quoining, Tuscan columns supporting the porch, and ornate Palladian windows. it was built in c. 1910 by Columbus Hatchett using locally fabricated concrete blocks, and is one of the community's finest examples of Colonial Revival architecture.

The house was listed on the National Register of Historic Places in 1993.

== See also ==
- National Register of Historic Places listings in Searcy County, Arkansas
