= Dr. Clay House =

Historic house in Arkansas, United States

- U.S. National Register of Historic Places
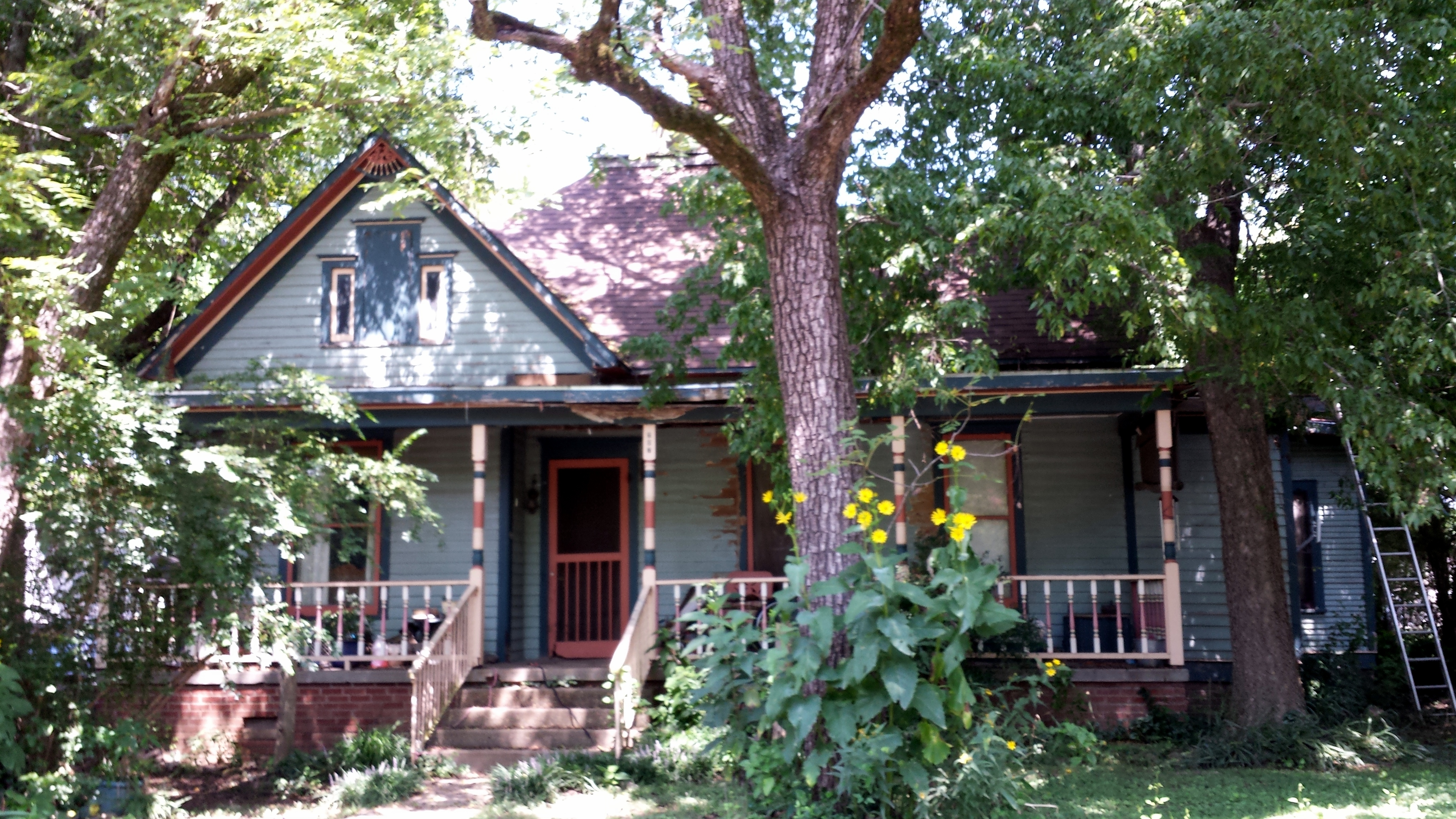

- Location within Arkansas Location within the United States
- Location: Jct. of Walnut and Center Sts., Leslie, Arkansas
- Coordinates: 35°49′46″N 92°33′33″W
- Area: less than one acre
- Built: 1907
- MPS: Searcy County MPS
- NRHP reference No.: 93001368
- Added to NRHP: December 2, 1993

The Dr. Clay House is a historic house at Walnut and Center Streets in Leslie, Arkansas. It is a 1 1/2-story, with irregular massing that includes a main block with a hip roof, a projecting front gable, and a rear addition. A shed-roof porch extends across the front, with turned posts and balustrade in a fanciful Folk Victorian style. Built in 1907 for a local doctor, it is the city's finest example of this style.

The house was listed on the National Register of Historic Places in 1993.

== See also ==
- National Register of Historic Places listings in Searcy County, Arkansas
