= Guy Bartley House =

Historic house in Arkansas, United States

- U.S. National Register of Historic Places
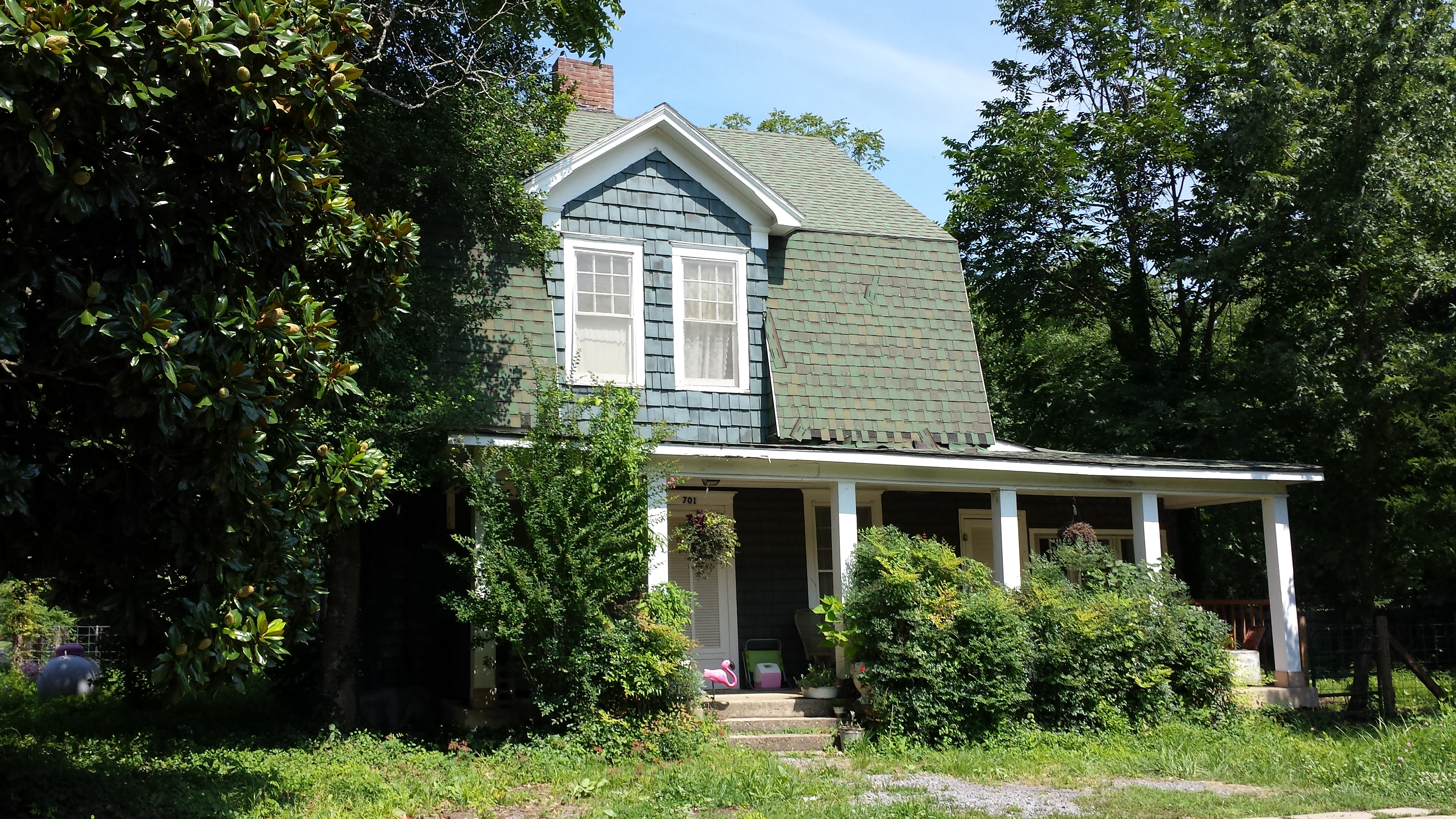

- Location within Arkansas Location within the United States
- Location: Jct. of Elm and Fifth Sts., NE corner, Leslie, Arkansas
- Coordinates: 35°50′2″N 92°33′25″W
- Area: less than one acre
- Built: 1906
- Architectural style: Colonial Revival
- MPS: Searcy County MPS
- NRHP reference No.: 93001372
- Added to NRHP: December 2, 1993

The Guy Bartley House is a historic house at the northeast corner of Elm and Fifth Streets in Leslie, Arkansas. It is a two-story wood-frame structure, with a gambrel roof and wood shingle siding. A single-story porch wraps around one side of the house, and has apparently been partly enclosed. The front and rear roof elevations each have large gabled wall dormers. Built in 1906, the house is a regionally unusual example of Colonial Revival architecture in with stylistic elements more commonly found in New England.

The house was listed on the National Register of Historic Places in 1993.

== See also ==
- National Register of Historic Places listings in Searcy County, Arkansas
