= Willmering Tourist Cabins Historic District =

Historic district in Arkansas, United States

- U.S. National Register of Historic Places
- U.S. Historic district
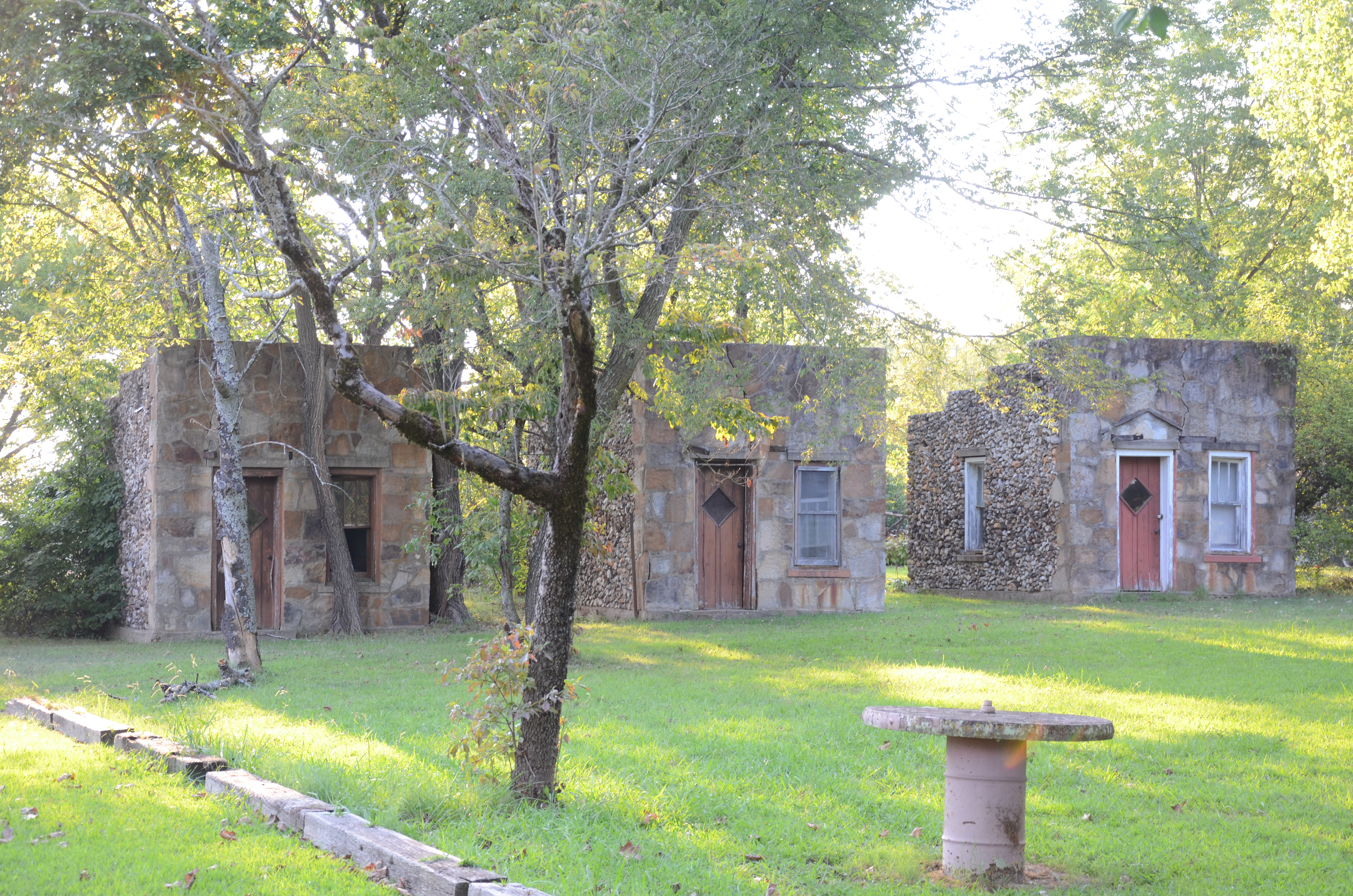

- Location within Arkansas Location within the United States
- Location: US 65, Silver Hill, Arkansas
- Coordinates: 35°58′9″N 92°44′52″W
- Area: less than one acre
- Built: 1946
- Architect: Harry Willmering, Homer Smith
- MPS: Arkansas Highway History and Architecture MPS
- NRHP reference No.: 00001361
- Added to NRHP: November 15, 2000

The Willmering Tourist Cabins Historic District encompasses a historic tourist accommodation on United States Route 65 in central northern Searcy County, Arkansas, just south of the Buffalo National River. Located behind the Silver Hill Float Service on the west side of the highway stand six stone and timber cabins, with large sandstone blocks and plank doors on the fronts, and shed roofs obscured by parapets. Built in 1946 by Harry Willmering, these vernacular structures are representative of tourist accommodations built in the period after World War II to cater to the automobile-based vacationing public.

The cabins were listed on the National Register of Historic Places in 2000.

== See also ==
- National Register of Historic Places listings in Searcy County, Arkansas
