= National Register of Historic Places listings in Searcy County, Arkansas =

Location of Searcy County in Arkansas

This is a list of the National Register of Historic Places listings in Searcy County, Arkansas.

This is intended to be a complete list of the properties and districts on the National Register of Historic Places in Searcy County, Arkansas, United States. The locations of National Register properties and districts for which the latitude and longitude coordinates are included below, may be seen in a map.

There are 53 properties and districts listed on the National Register in the county.

Contents: Counties in Arkansas
- Arkansas
- Ashley
- Baxter
- Benton
- Boone
- Bradley
- Calhoun
- Carroll
- Chicot
- Clark
- Clay
- Cleburne
- Cleveland
- Columbia
- Conway
- Craighead
- Crawford
- Crittenden
- Cross
- Dallas
- Desha
- Drew
- Faulkner
- Franklin
- Fulton
- Garland
- Grant
- Greene
- Hempstead
- Hot Spring
- Howard
- Independence
- Izard
- Jackson
- Jefferson
- Johnson
- Lafayette
- Lawrence
- Lee
- Lincoln
- Little River
- Logan
- Lonoke
- Madison
- Marion
- Miller
- Mississippi
- Monroe
- Montgomery
- Nevada
- Newton
- Ouachita
- Perry
- Phillips
- Pike
- Poinsett
- Polk
- Pope
- Prairie
- Pulaski (Little Rock)
- Randolph
- St. Francis
- Saline
- Scott
- Searcy
- Sebastian
- Sevier
- Sharp
- Stone
- Union
- Van Buren
- Washington
- White
- Woodruff
- Yell

This National Park Service list is complete through NPS recent listings posted December 19, 2025.

== Current listings ==
	Name on the Register	Image	Date listed	Location	City or town	Description
1	3SE33		June 29, 1976 (#76000468)	Address Restricted	Silver Hill	AKA the Calf Creek site, a major archaeological site on the Buffalo River.
2	Aday-Stephenson House		December 2, 1993 (#93001365)	Pine St. 35°54′22″N 92°37′29″W	Marshall	No longer standing.
3	American Legion Post No. 131	American Legion Post No. 131	December 2, 1993 (#93001369)	Center St. west of its junction with Walnut St. 35°49′46″N 92°33′36″W	Leslie	
4	Bank of Marshall Building	Bank of Marshall Building	October 4, 1993 (#93000974)	Southeastern corner of the junction of Main and Center Sts. 35°54′33″N 92°37′53″W	Marshall	
5	Guy Bartley House	Guy Bartley House	December 2, 1993 (#93001372)	Northeastern corner of the junction of Elm and 5th Sts. 35°50′02″N 92°33′25″W	Leslie	
6	Bates Tourist Court	Bates Tourist Court	October 4, 1993 (#93000979)	Fair St. 35°54′39″N 92°37′56″W	Marshall	
7	Bromley-Mills-Treece House	Bromley-Mills-Treece House	October 4, 1993 (#93000966)	Main St. 35°54′32″N 92°37′43″W	Marshall	
8	Brush Creek Bridge		January 8, 2025 (#100011301)	Center Street over Brush Creek; 35°54′59″N 92°37′46″W	Marshall	
9	Noah Bryan Store	Noah Bryan Store	August 18, 1993 (#93000760)	Southwestern corner of the junction of Glade and Main Sts. 35°54′33″N 92°37′56″W	Marshall	
10	Campbell Post Office-Kuykendall General Store	Campbell Post Office-Kuykendall General Store	December 2, 1993 (#93001364)	County Road 73 northwest of Oxley; 35°52′19″N 92°28′35″W	Oxley	No longer standing.
10	Dr. Clay House	Dr. Clay House	December 2, 1993 (#93001368)	Junction of Walnut and Center Sts. 35°49′46″N 92°33′33″W	Leslie	
11	Cooper's Bluff		May 4, 1982 (#82002132)	Address Restricted	Snowball	part of the Rock Art Sites in Arkansas Thematic Resource (TR)
12	Dr. J.O. Cotton House	Dr. J.O. Cotton House	December 2, 1993 (#93001366)	Southeastern corner of the junction of Highway 66 and High St. 35°49′49″N 92°33′28″W	Leslie	
13	Cove Creek Bridge		September 10, 2024 (#100010840)	Arkansas Highway 66 over Cove Creek; 35°49′42″N 92°33′43″W	Leslie	
14	Dr. Sam G. Daniel House	Dr. Sam G. Daniel House	August 18, 1993 (#93000759)	Northern side of Nome St., one block west of Courthouse Square; 35°54′36″N 92°37′57″W	Marshall	
15	Farmers Bank Building	Farmers Bank Building	August 18, 1993 (#93000753)	Junction of Main and Walnut Sts. 35°49′44″N 92°33′35″W	Leslie	
16	Bud Fendley House	Bud Fendley House	August 18, 1993 (#93000816)	201 Spring St. 35°54′28″N 92°37′45″W	Marshall	
17	Ferguson Gas Station		October 4, 1993 (#93000967)	Southeastern corner of the junction of Center and U.S. Highway 65; 35°54′37″N 92°37′52″W	Marshall	
18	T.M. Ferguson House		October 4, 1993 (#93000972)	Canaan St. 35°54′29″N 92°38′05″W	Marshall	No longer standing.
19	Zeb Ferguson House		October 4, 1993 (#93000968)	U.S. Highway 65; 35°54′39″N 92°37′51″W	Marshall	No longer standing.
20	Gates-Helm Farm	Gates-Helm Farm	August 18, 1993 (#93000817)	County Road 13, approximately 1 mile (1.6 km) north of its junction with County Road 250; 35°55′16″N 92°50′04″W	Snowball	
21	Mary Greenhaw Memorial Methodist Episcopal Church South	Mary Greenhaw Memorial Methodist Episcopal Church South	September 24, 2012 (#12000805)	115 E. Nome St. 35°54′36″N 92°37′49″W	Marshall	
22	Columbus Hatchett House	Columbus Hatchett House	August 18, 1993 (#93000756)	Northern side of the junction of Main and Hazel Sts. 35°49′40″N 92°33′26″W	Leslie	
23	Henley Hotel	Henley Hotel	January 24, 2011 (#10001152)	112 U.S. Highway 65 North; 36°01′47″N 92°48′09″W	St. Joe	
24	Benjamin Franklin Henley House	Benjamin Franklin Henley House	December 5, 1985 (#85003070)	Off U.S. Highway 65; 36°02′15″N 92°47′09″W	St. Joe	
25	Dr. Cleveland Hollabaugh House	Dr. Cleveland Hollabaugh House	December 2, 1993 (#93001371)	Oak St. 35°49′56″N 92°33′34″W	Leslie	
26	S.A. Lay House	S.A. Lay House	October 4, 1993 (#93000971)	Junction of Glade St. and U.S. Highway 65; 35°54′38″N 92°37′55″W	Marshall	
27	Leslie Commercial Historic District	Leslie Commercial Historic District	July 3, 2017 (#100001257)	319-424 Main and 205 Oak Sts. 35°49′46″N 92°33′36″W	Leslie	
28	Leslie-Rolen House	Leslie-Rolen House	August 18, 1993 (#93000815)	Junction of Cherry and High Sts. 35°49′48″N 92°33′25″W	Leslie	
29	Anthony Luna House	Anthony Luna House	October 4, 1993 (#93000975)	Southwestern corner of the junction of Main and Spring Sts. 35°54′33″N 92°37′50″W	Marshall	
30	Thomas Lynch House		August 18, 1993 (#93000757)	County Road 52, approximately 2.5 miles (4.0 km) north of Morning Star; 36°00′18″N 92°35′52″W	Morning Star	
31	Sam Marshall House		October 4, 1993 (#93000980)	County Road 163; 35°58′14″N 92°35′05″W	Morning Star	
32	William P. and Rosa Lee Martin Farm		June 15, 2011 (#11000356)	7429 Campbell Rd. 35°56′04″N 92°28′26″W	Marshall	
33	Mays General Store	Mays General Store	September 1, 1983 (#83001166)	Front St. 35°59′20″N 92°42′57″W	Gilbert	
34	J.M. McCall House	J.M. McCall House	October 4, 1993 (#93000970)	Spring St. 35°54′18″N 92°37′46″W	Marshall	
35	Vinie McCall House		October 4, 1993 (#93000969)	Spring St. 35°54′20″N 92°37′45″W	Marshall	No longer standing.
36	Meek Building	Meek Building	November 15, 2000 (#00001367)	Junction of Main and Oak Sts. 35°49′47″N 92°33′36″W	Leslie	
37	J.C. Miller House	J.C. Miller House	December 2, 1993 (#93001370)	Northwestern corner of the junction of Oak and High Sts. 35°49′56″N 92°33′34″W	Leslie	
38	Missouri and North Arkansas Depot-Leslie	Missouri and North Arkansas Depot-Leslie	June 11, 1992 (#92000613)	Southwestern end of Walnut St. 35°49′38″N 92°33′32″W	Leslie	
39	Oak Hill School House		January 24, 2019 (#100003339)	151 Little Oak Hill Rd. 35°49′21″N 92°43′49″W	Marshall	
40	Old Searcy County Jail	Old Searcy County Jail	May 28, 2010 (#10000290)	Highway 27 (Center St.); 35°54′35″N 92°37′54″W	Marshall	
41	Charley Passmore House	Charley Passmore House	October 4, 1993 (#93000978)	Campus St. 35°54′19″N 92°37′56″W	Marshall	
42	Oscar Redman Building	Oscar Redman Building	August 18, 1993 (#93000758)	119 E. Main St. 35°54′34″N 92°37′52″W	Marshall	
43	W.F. Reeves House		October 4, 1993 (#93000977)	Short St. 35°54′48″N 92°38′02″W	Marshall	No longer standing.
44	Dr. Robinson House		December 2, 1993 (#93001367)	Walnut St. east of its junction with Center St. 35°49′46″N 92°33′31″W	Leslie	No longer standing.
45	St. Joe Missouri and North Arkansas Railroad Depot	St. Joe Missouri and North Arkansas Railroad Depot	September 16, 1993 (#93000988)	Southern side of U.S. Highway 65; 36°01′47″N 92°48′09″W	St. Joe	
46	Sanders-Hollabaugh House	Sanders-Hollabaugh House	October 4, 1993 (#93000976)	Church St. 35°54′39″N 92°37′47″W	Marshall	
47	Searcy County Courthouse	Searcy County Courthouse	October 21, 1976 (#76000467)	Courthouse Sq. 35°54′34″N 92°37′55″W	Marshall	
48	Snowball Gymnasium		September 16, 2020 (#100005592)	Cty. Rd. 12, .1 mile west of Harvest Ln. 35°54′24″N 92°49′29″W	Snowball	
49	Greene Thomas House	Greene Thomas House	August 18, 1993 (#93000755)	West of County Road 55, 0.25 miles (0.40 km) south of its junction with County Road 74; 35°51′32″N 92°33′58″W	Leslie	
50	Treat Commercial Building	Treat Commercial Building	August 18, 1993 (#93000752)	Northwestern side of Oak St. between High and 4th Sts. 35°49′49″N 92°33′36″W	Leslie	
51	Jasper E. Treece Building	Jasper E. Treece Building	August 18, 1993 (#93000754)	West of County Road 55, approximately 0.5 miles (0.80 km) south of its junction with Highway 74; 35°54′16″N 92°35′44″W	Baker	
52	Willmering Tourist Cabins Historic District	Willmering Tourist Cabins Historic District	November 15, 2000 (#00001361)	U.S. Highway 65; 35°58′09″N 92°44′52″W	Silver Hill	

== Former listings ==
	Name on the Register	Image	Date listed	Date removed	Location	City or town	Description
1	Dugger and Schultz Millinery Store Building		October 4, 1993 (#93000973)	January 26, 2018	Southwestern corner of the junction of Glade and Nome Sts. 35°54′35″N 92°37′57″W	Marshall	Demolished. Now site of the Marshall Post Office.

== See also ==
- List of National Historic Landmarks in Arkansas
- National Register of Historic Places listings in Arkansas
