= Charley Passmore House =

Historic house in Arkansas, United States

- U.S. National Register of Historic Places
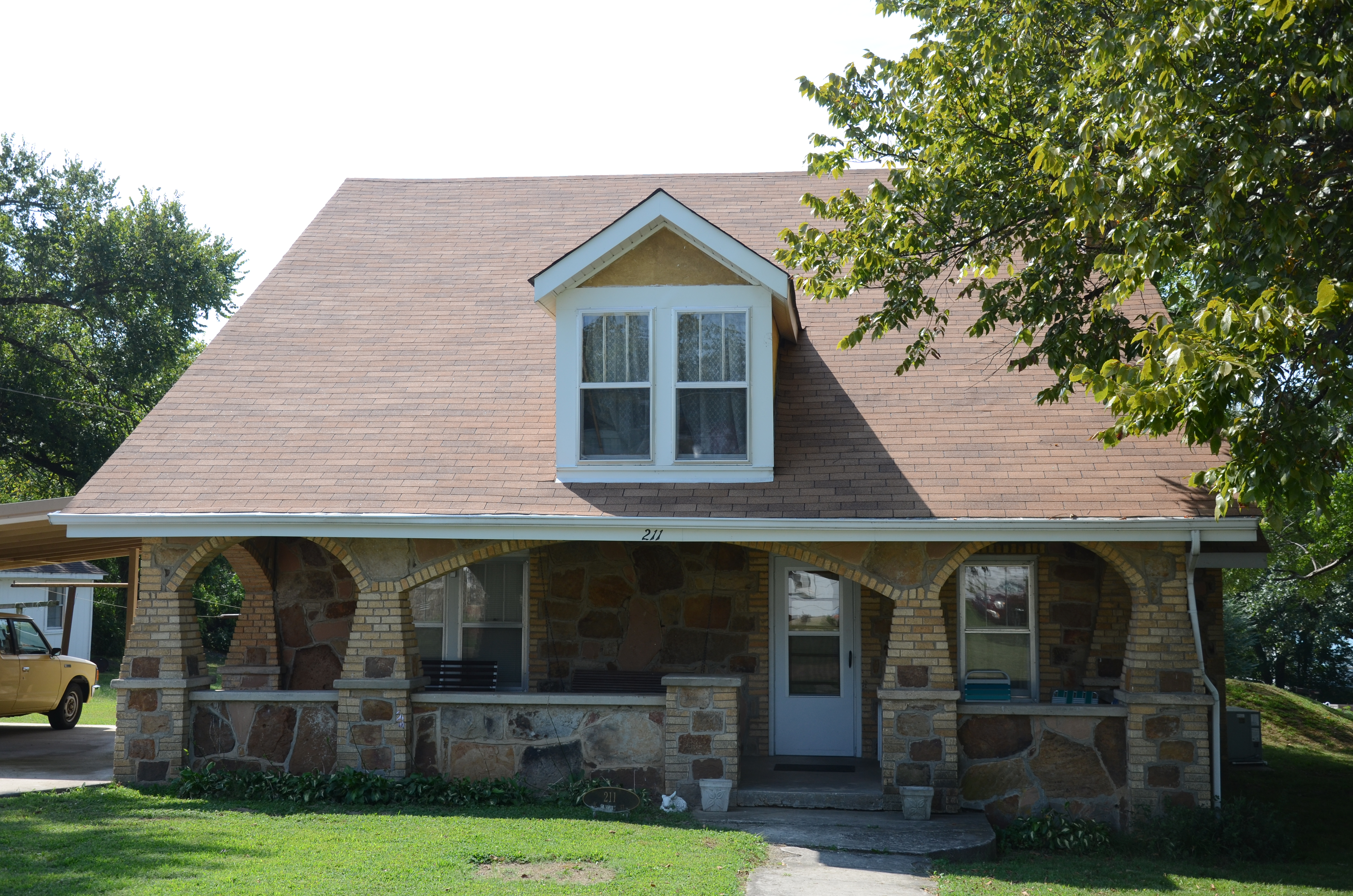

- Location within Arkansas Location within the United States
- Location: Campus St., Marshall, Arkansas
- Coordinates: 35°54′19″N 92°37′56″W
- Area: less than one acre
- Built: 1938
- Built by: Charles Passmore
- Architectural style: Bungalow/Craftsman
- MPS: Searcy County MPS
- NRHP reference No.: 93000978
- Added to NRHP: October 4, 1993

The Charley Passmore House is a historic house on Campus Street in Marshall, Arkansas. It is a 1 1/2-story wood-frame structure, finished with masonry veneer, gable roof, and stone foundation. A single-story porch extends across the front, supported by piers of brick and stone joined by arched spandrels. A gabled dormer projects from the roof above the porch. The house was built in 1938, and is an excellent local example of Craftsman architecture executed primarily in stone and brick.

The house was listed on the National Register of Historic Places in 1993.

== See also ==
- National Register of Historic Places listings in Searcy County, Arkansas
