= Dugger and Schultz Millinery Store Building =

- Formerly listed on the U.S. National Register of Historic Places
- Location within Arkansas Location within the United States
- Location: Jct. of Glade and Nome Sts., SW corner, Marshall, Arkansas
- Coordinates: 35°54′35″N 92°37′57″W
- Area: less than one acre
- Built: 1905
- Built by: Ashley, Frazier
- Architectural style: Romanesque
- MPS: Searcy County MPS
- NRHP reference No.: 93000973

Significant dates
- Added to NRHP: October 4, 1993
- Removed from NRHP: January 26, 2018

The Dugger and Schultz Millinery Store Building was a historic commercial building at the southwest corner of Glade and Nome Streets in Marshall, Arkansas. It was a single-story structure, built out of rusticated stone in the style typical of the Ozark Mountains. The rounded-arch openings of the facade, the entrance recessed in the rightmost, gave the building a Romanesque Revival flavor. It was built in 1905 by Frazier Ashley, a local stonemason, and initially housed a hatmaker's shop.

The building was listed on the National Register of Historic Places in 1993. It was subsequently demolished to make way for Marshall's new post office, and was delisted in 2018.

== See also ==
- National Register of Historic Places listings in Searcy County, Arkansas
