= Mary Greenhaw Memorial Methodist Episcopal Church South =

Historic church in Arkansas, United States

- Mary Greenhaw Memorial Methodist Episcopal Church
- U.S. National Register of Historic Places
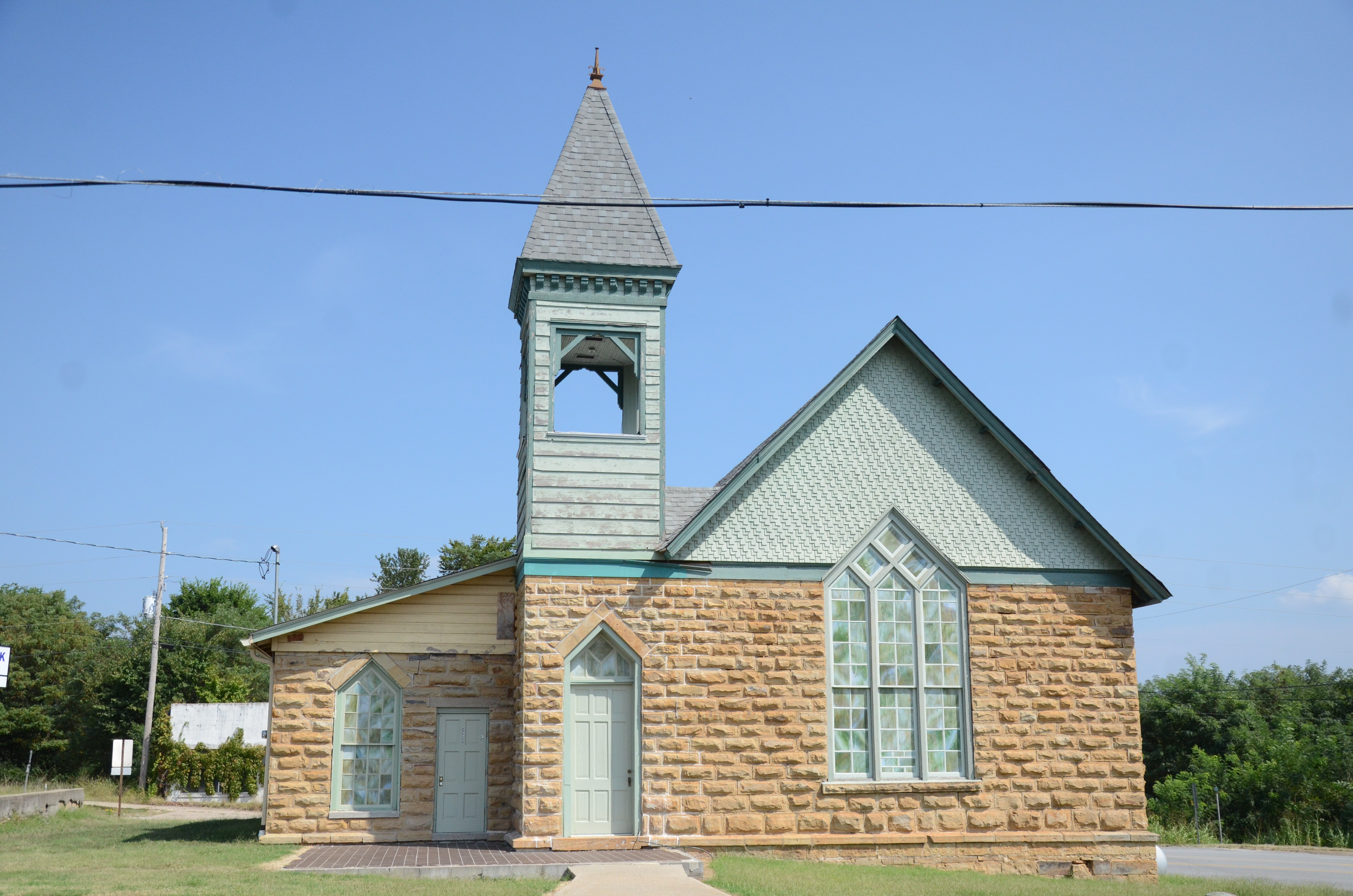

- Location within Arkansas Location within the United States
- Location: 115 E. Nome St., Marshall, Arkansas
- Coordinates: 35°54′36″N 92°37′49″W
- Area: less than one acre
- Built: c. 1900
- NRHP reference No.: 12000805
- Added to NRHP: September 24, 2012

The Mary Greenhaw Memorial Methodist Episcopal Church South is a historic church at 115 East Nome Street in Marshall, Arkansas. It is a single-story stone structure, in a vernacular interpretation of the Gothic Revival style. Its windows are simplified versions of lancet-arch Gothic windows, and the tower has a steeply pitched pyramidal roof above an open belfry. The church was built c. 1900 for a congregation established about 1871. Its building is named after a member of the locally prominent Greenhaw family.

The church was listed on the National Register of Historic Places in 2012. As of 2012, it was no longer a Methodist church but housed a Church of the Nazarene congregation.

== See also ==
- National Register of Historic Places listings in Searcy County, Arkansas
