= Leslie station (Arkansas) =

- Missouri and North Arkansas Depot-Leslie
- U.S. National Register of Historic Places
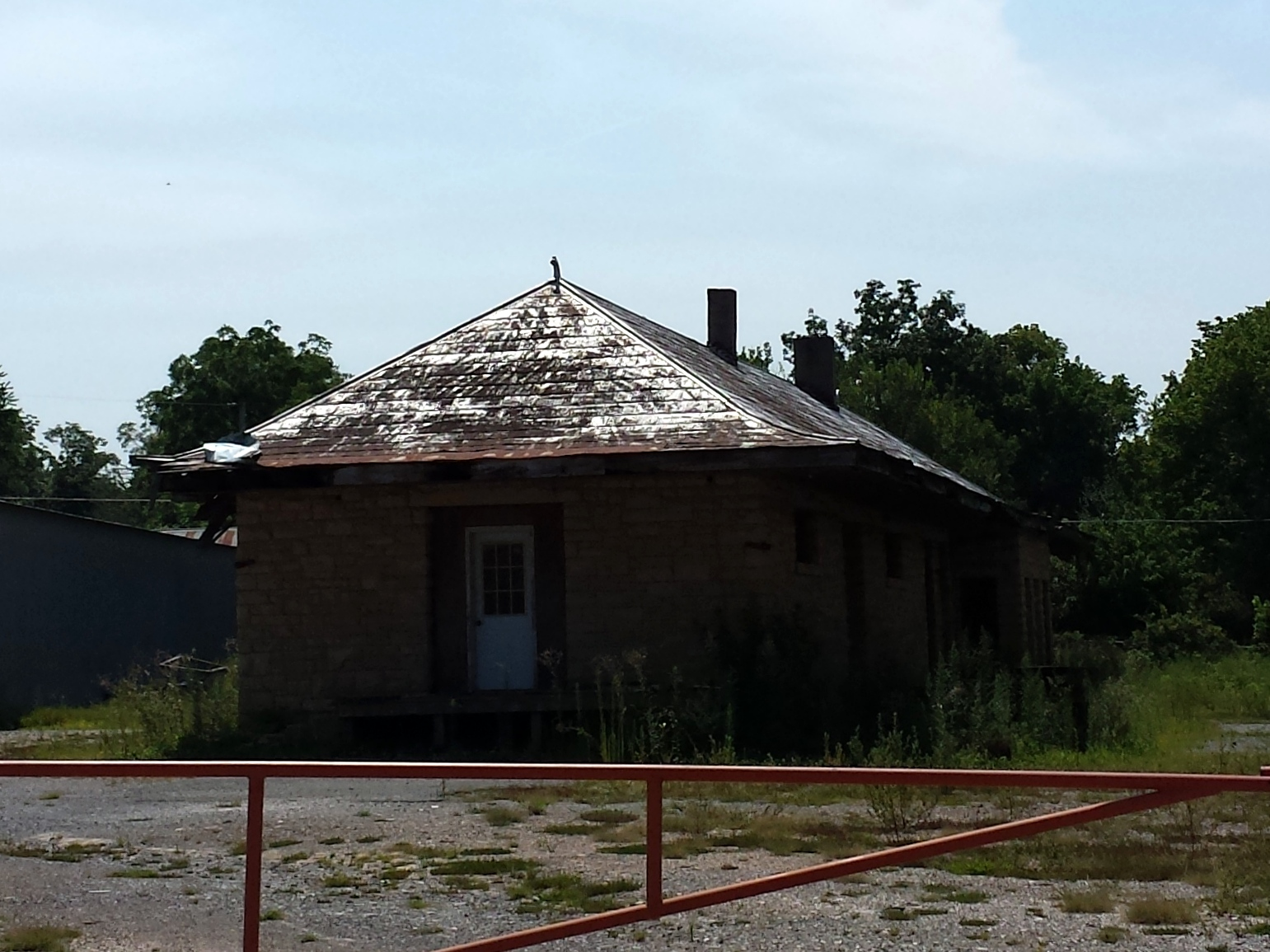

- Location within Arkansas Location within the United States
- Location: SW end of Walnut St., Leslie, Arkansas
- Coordinates: 35°49′38″N 92°33′32″W
- Area: less than one acre
- Built: 1925
- Built by: Missouri & North Arkansas Railroad
- Architectural style: Late 19th And Early 20th Century American Movements, Plain Traditional
- MPS: Historic Railroad Depots of Arkansas MPS
- NRHP reference No.: 92000613
- Added to NRHP: June 11, 1992

The Missouri and North Arkansas Depot-Leslie is a historic railroad station at the end of Walnut Street in Leslie, Arkansas. It is a long rectangular single-story building, with stone walls and a bellcast hip roof with extended eaves. A telegrapher's bay projects from the southwest side. It was built c. 1925, and is a surviving representative of the economic success brought to the community with the arrival of the railroad in 1903.

The station was listed on the National Register of Historic Places in 1992.

== See also ==
- National Register of Historic Places listings in Searcy County, Arkansas
