= Dr. Robinson House =

Historic house in Arkansas, United States

- U.S. National Register of Historic Places
- Location within Arkansas Location within the United States
- Location: Walnut St. E of jct. with Center St., Leslie, Arkansas
- Coordinates: 35°49′46″N 92°33′31″W
- Area: less than one acre
- Built: 1917
- Architectural style: Colonial Revival
- MPS: Searcy County MPS
- NRHP reference No.: 93001367
- Added to NRHP: December 2, 1993

The Dr. Robinson House is a historic house on Walnut Street east of Center Street in Leslie, Arkansas. It is a 1 1/2-story wood-frame structure, with a hip-roofed main section and projecting gable sections to the front and rear. A single-story porch extends across the portion of the front to the right of the gable section, supported by Classical turned columns with a turned balustrade. A rear screened porch has similar supports. The house was built c. 1917-18 for a doctor who primarily served local railroad workers.

The house was listed on the National Register of Historic Places in 1993.

== See also ==
- National Register of Historic Places listings in Searcy County, Arkansas
