= Henley Hotel =

- U.S. National Register of Historic Places
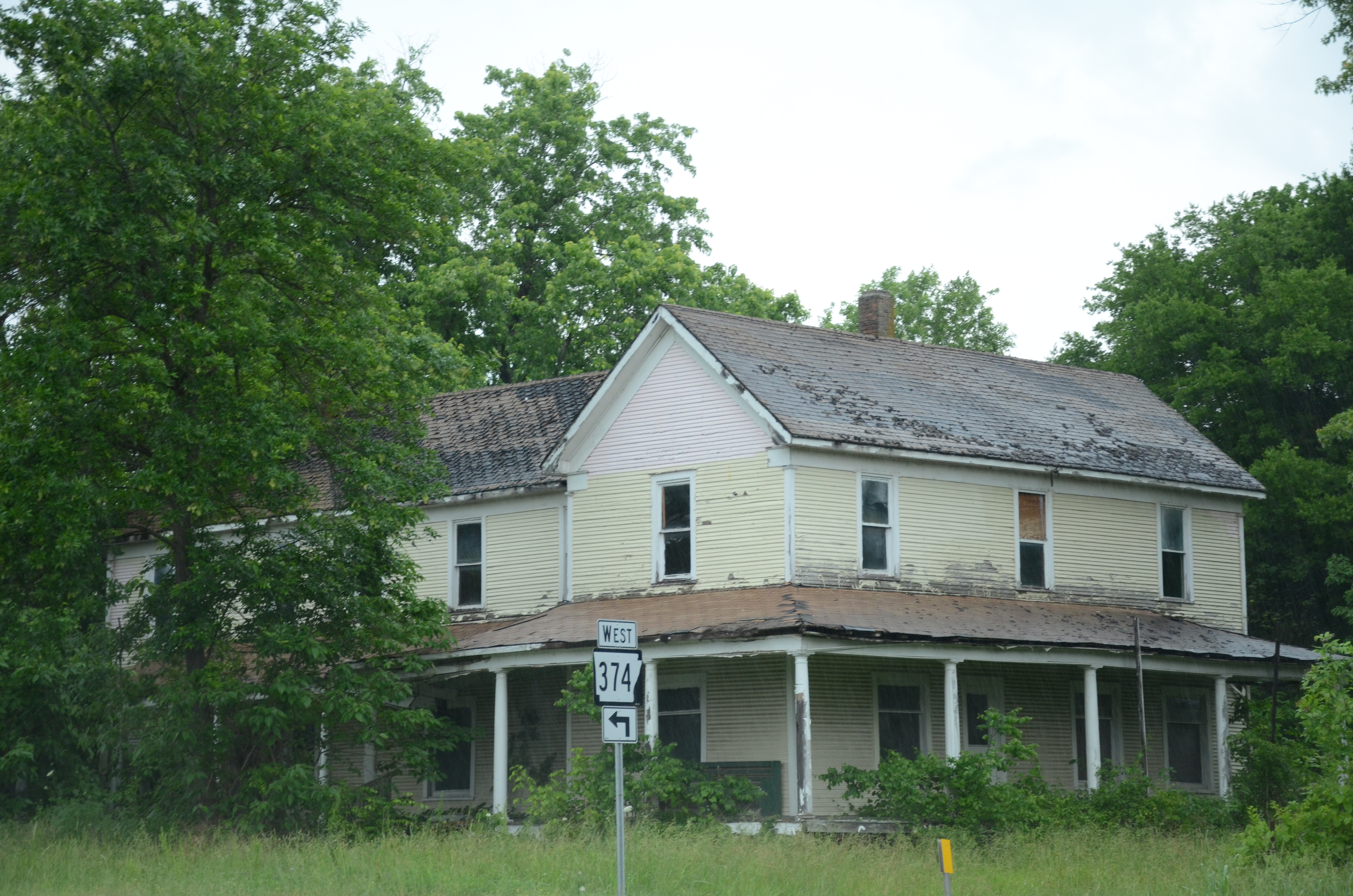

- Location within Arkansas Location within the United States
- Location: 112 US 65 North, St. Joe, Arkansas
- Coordinates: 36°1′47″N 92°48′9″W
- Area: less than one acre
- Built: 1913
- Architectural style: Plain Traditional
- NRHP reference No.: 10001152
- Added to NRHP: January 24, 2011

The Henley Hotel is a historic hotel building at 112 United States Highway 65 North in downtown St. Joe, Arkansas. It is a two-story wood-frame structure, with a gable roof and novelty siding. It has a wraparound porch supported by Doric columns, and the building corners are adorned with pilasters. It is the largest building in the small community, built c. 1913 to provide service to travelers on the railroad, which was built to the community in 1903. It served as a hotel until closing in the 1930s due to the Great Depression, and remained a private home of the Henleys until the 1970s.

The building was listed on the National Register of Historic Places in 2011.

== See also ==
- National Register of Historic Places listings in Searcy County, Arkansas
