= S.A. Lay House =

Historic house in Arkansas, United States

- S. A. Lay House
- U.S. National Register of Historic Places
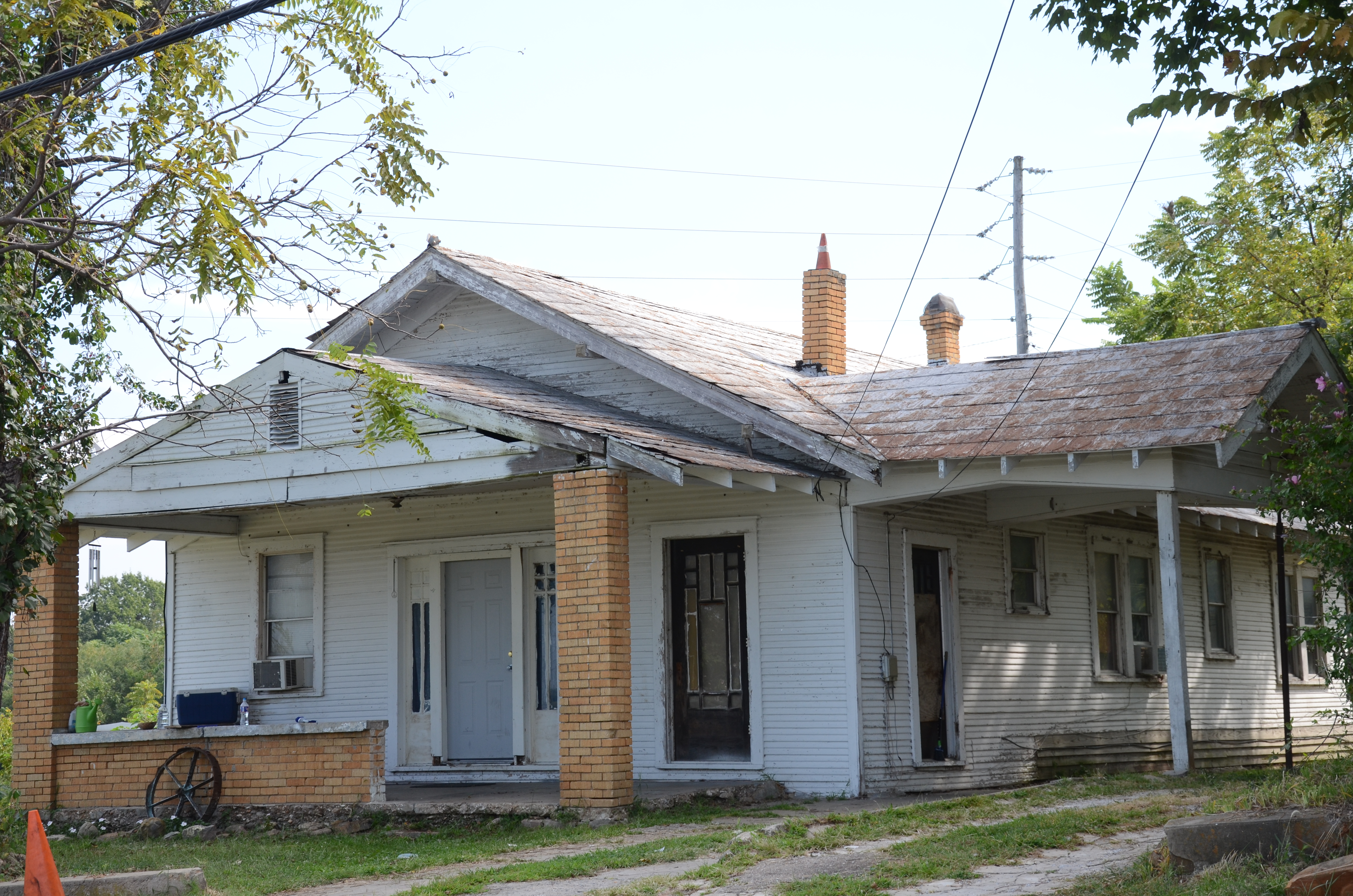

- Location within Arkansas Location within the United States
- Location: Jct. of Glade St. and US 65, Marshall, Arkansas
- Coordinates: 35°54′38″N 92°37′55″W
- Area: 0 acres (0 ha)
- Architectural style: Bungalow/craftsman
- MPS: Searcy County MPS
- NRHP reference No.: 93000971
- Added to NRHP: October 4, 1993

The S.A. Lay House is a historic house at Glade Street and United States Route 65 in Marshall, Arkansas, United States. It is a single-story wood-frame structure with a front-facing gable roof. A gabled porch extends across much of the front, supported by brick columns separated by a slightly arched span. A similarly styled porte cochere extends to the right, both roof lines featuring Craftsman-style exposed rafter ends. The house was built in 1921, and is noted for its local architectural significance.

The house was listed on the National Register of Historic Places in 1993.

== See also ==
- National Register of Historic Places listings in Searcy County, Arkansas
