= Vinie McCall House =

Historic house in Arkansas, United States

- U.S. National Register of Historic Places
- Location within Arkansas Location within the United States
- Location: Spring St., Marshall, Arkansas
- Coordinates: 35°54′20″N 92°37′45″W
- Area: less than one acre
- Architectural style: Plain Traditional
- MPS: Searcy County MPS
- NRHP reference No.: 93000969
- Added to NRHP: October 4, 1993

The Vinie McCall House is a historic house on Spring Street in Marshall, Arkansas. It is a 1 1/2-story wood-frame structure, with a side-gable roof, central chimney, weatherboard siding, and stone pier foundation. The front (west-facing) facade has a cross gable at the center of the roof, with two narrow windows in it, above the main entrance. The entrance stands under a hip-roof porch roughly the width of the gable, supported by five turned columns and decorated with a spindled frieze. The house was built c. 1895, and is a well-preserved vernacular house with Folk Victorian details from the late 19th century.

The house was listed on the National Register of Historic Places in 1993.

== See also ==
- National Register of Historic Places listings in Searcy County, Arkansas
