= Thomas Lynch House =

Historic house in Arkansas, United States

- U.S. National Register of Historic Places
- Location within Arkansas Location within the United States
- Nearest city: Morning Star, Arkansas
- Coordinates: 36°0′18″N 92°35′52″W
- Area: less than one acre
- Architect: T.A. Lynch
- Architectural style: log dogtrot
- MPS: Searcy County MPS
- NRHP reference No.: 93000757
- Added to NRHP: August 18, 1993

The Thomas Lynch House is a historic house in rural northern Searcy County, Arkansas, United States. It is located down a private lane east of County Road 52, north of the Pine Grove Church. It is a single-story dogtrot, fashioned out of square-cut oak logs chinked with concrete, and topped by a metal roof. A porch extends across the front, supported by unfinished square posts, and a kitchen ell extending to the south is the only significant alteration. The house was built about 1900 by Thomas Lynch alias Ben Maloy.

The house was listed on the National Register of Historic Places in 1993.

== See also ==
- National Register of Historic Places listings in Searcy County, Arkansas
