= Treat Commercial Building =

- U.S. National Register of Historic Places
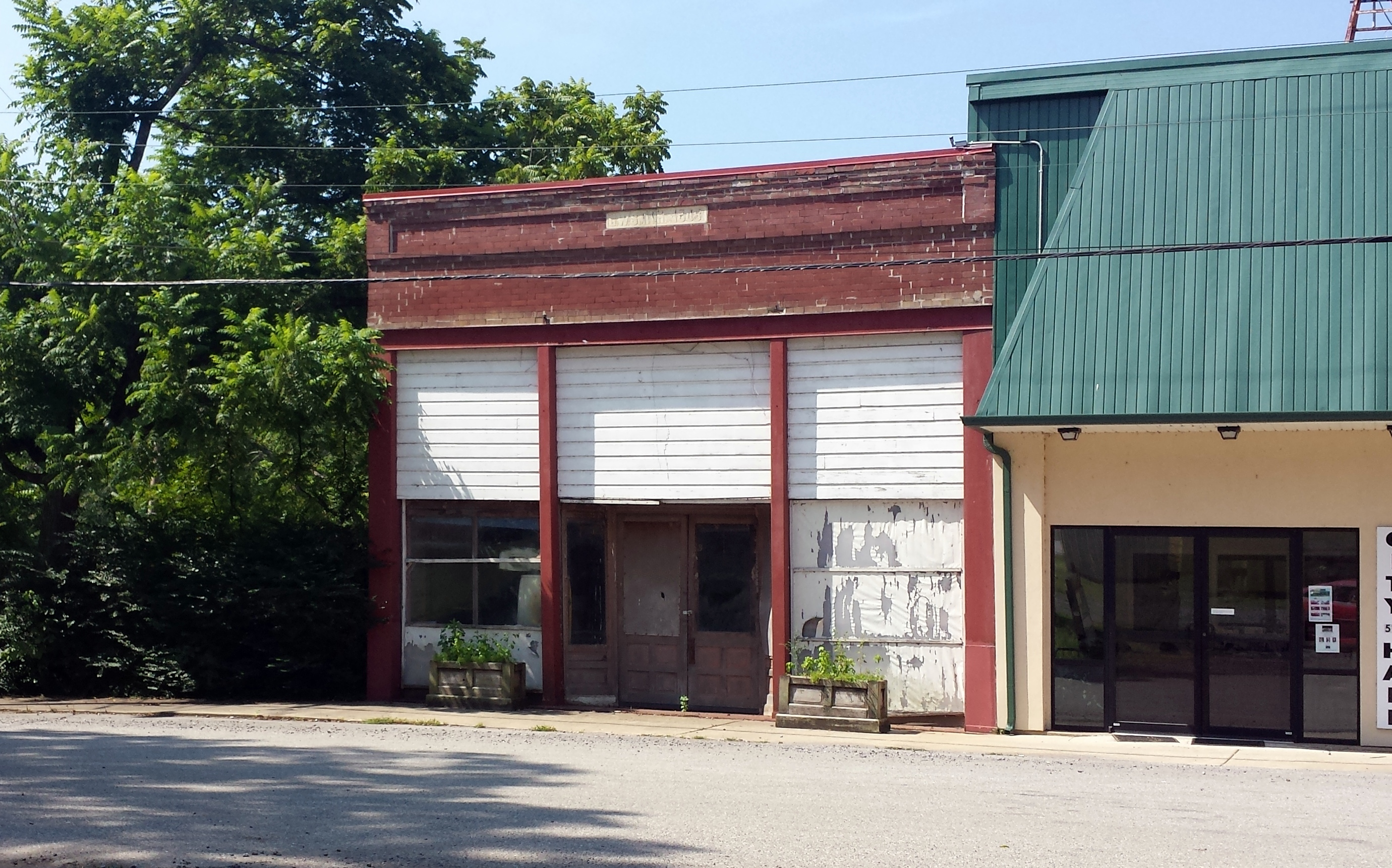

- Location within Arkansas Location within the United States
- Location: Oak St. NW side, between High and 4th Sts., Leslie, Arkansas
- Coordinates: 35°49′49″N 92°33′36″W
- Area: less than one acre
- Built: 1910
- Architectural style: Plain Traditional
- MPS: Searcy County MPS
- NRHP reference No.: 93000752
- Added to NRHP: August 18, 1993

The Treat Commercial Building is a historic commercial building on Oak Street, between High and 4th Streets, in Leslie, Arkansas. It is a single-story brick structure, with a vernacular early-20th century storefront and sharing party walls with its neighbors. The front has a pair of plate glass windows flanking a recessed entrance, and is topped by a parapet. The interior retains original fixtures and a coffered pressed-metal ceiling. Built in 1910, it is one of Leslie's oldest commercial buildings.

The building was listed on the National Register of Historic Places in 1993.

== See also ==
- National Register of Historic Places listings in Searcy County, Arkansas
