= Dr. J.O. Cotton House =

Historic house in Arkansas, United States

- Dr. J. O. Cotton House
- U.S. National Register of Historic Places
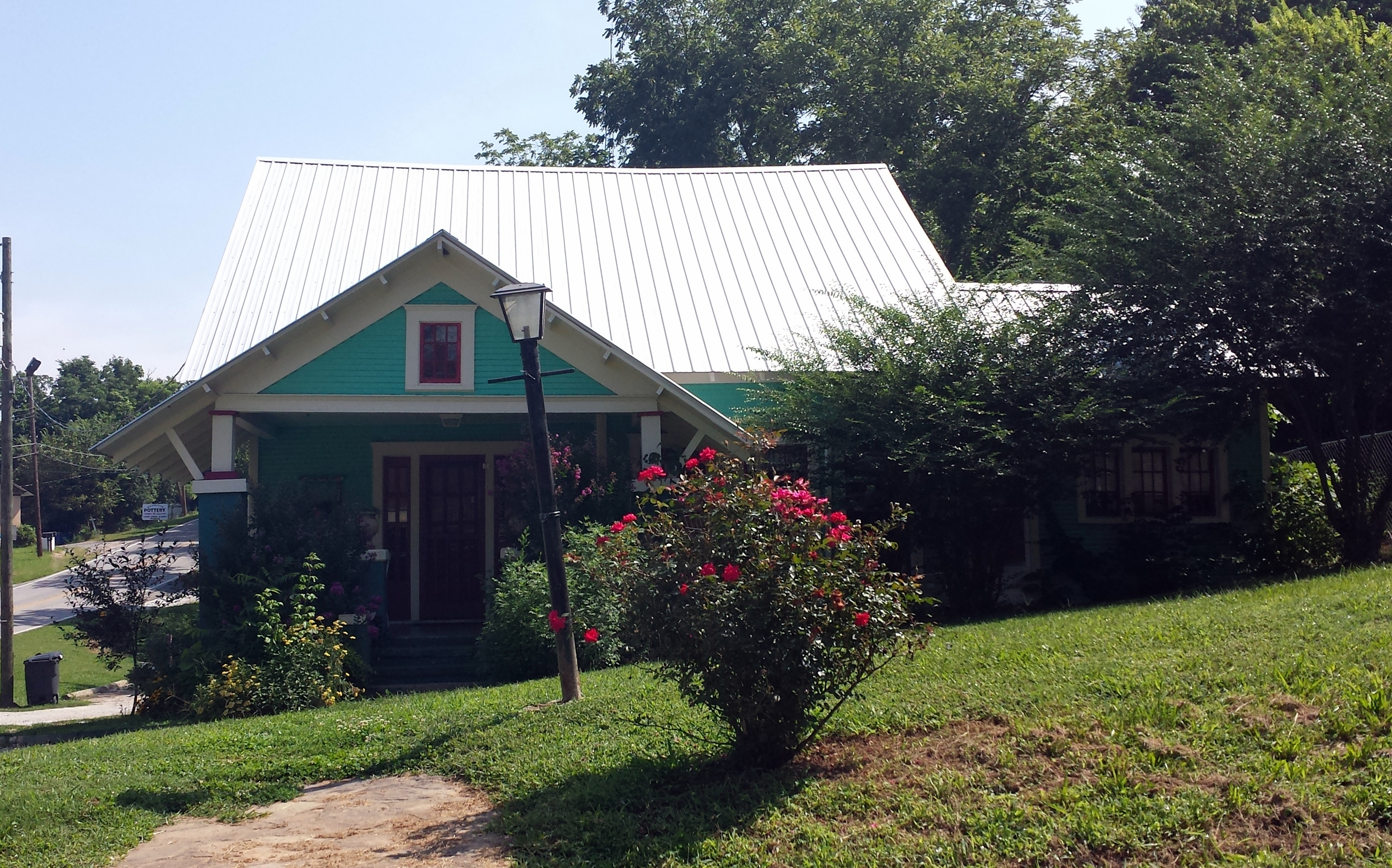

- Location within Arkansas Location within the United States
- Location: Jct. of AR 66 and High St., SE corner, Leslie, Arkansas
- Coordinates: 35°49′49″N 92°33′28″W
- Area: less than one acre
- Built: 1915
- MPS: Searcy County MPS
- NRHP reference No.: 93001366
- Added to NRHP: December 2, 1993

The Dr. J.O. Cotton House is a historic house at the southeast corner of Arkansas Highway 66 and High street in Leslie, Arkansas. It is a single-story Craftsman style structure, with an irregular layout focused on a gable-roofed rectangular core. A small single-story gabled wing extends to the right, and the entry porch projects forward from the left side of the front facade, with a gable roof that has exposed rafters and is supported by decorative braces on tall brick piers. It was built in 1915, originally at Walnut and High Streets, for one of the community's early doctors.

The house was listed on the National Register of Historic Places in 1993.

== See also ==
- National Register of Historic Places listings in Searcy County, Arkansas
