= Sam Marshall House =

Historic house in Arkansas, United States

- U.S. National Register of Historic Places
- Location within Arkansas Location within the United States
- Nearest city: Morning Star, Arkansas
- Coordinates: 35°58′14″N 92°35′5″W
- Area: less than one acre
- Built: 1929
- Architect: Sam Marshall
- Architectural style: Plain Traditional
- MPS: Searcy County MPS
- NRHP reference No.: 93000980
- Added to NRHP: October 4, 1993

The Sam Marshall House is a historic house in rural Searcy County, Arkansas. It is located southeast of Morning Star, on the west side of County Road 163. It is a single-story log structure, rectangular in plan, with a roof whose front gable extends over a porch supported by square columns. The logs were apparently hand-hewn, and joined by dovetailed notches. Built in 1929, it is one of the latest examples of log construction in the county.

The house was listed on the National Register of Historic Places in 1993.

== See also ==
- National Register of Historic Places listings in Searcy County, Arkansas
