= Aday-Stephenson House =

Historic house in Arkansas, United States

- U.S. National Register of Historic Places
- Location within Arkansas Location within the United States
- Location: West side of Pine Street, Marshall, Arkansas
- Coordinates: 35°54′22″N 92°37′29″W
- Area: less than one acre
- Built: 1903
- Architect: John Aday
- Architectural style: Plain Traditional
- MPS: Searcy County MPS
- NRHP reference No.: 93001365
- Added to NRHP: December 2, 1993

The Aday-Stephenson House is a historic house located on the west side of Pine Street in Marshall, Arkansas.

== Description and history ==
It is a 1 1/2-story timber-framed structure, built in the manner of a dogtrot house, with an integral ell extending one of the piles. It has a side gable roof, and a full-width porch across the front, supported by round columns. The front elevation is symmetrically composed of two pairs of windows flanking two centrally-placed, separate single leaf doors, each leading into a pen behind. The house was built c. 1903-05 by John Aday, a developer who platted this part of Marshall for development.

The house was listed on the National Register of Historic Places on December 2, 1993.

== See also ==
- National Register of Historic Places listings in Searcy County, Arkansas
