= Oak Hill School House =

- U.S. National Register of Historic Places
- Location within Arkansas Location within the United States
- Location: 151 Little Oak Hill Road, southwest of Marshall, Arkansas
- Coordinates: 35°49′21″N 92°43′49″W
- Area: less than one acre
- Architectural style: Plain Traditional
- NRHP reference No.: 100003339
- Added to NRHP: January 24, 2019

The Oak Hill School House is a historic school building at 151 Little Oak Hill Road in rural Searcy County, Arkansas, southwest of Marshall, Arkansas. It is a single-story stone structure, with a stone foundation, and a gabled roof made of corrugated metal. A gabled porch shelters the main entrance at the center of the north facade, supported by square posts. The school was built about 1934 on the site of a wood-frame school built in 1910, and served the area community until the mid-1950s. It continues to serve the area community as a gathering place for social events and religious services.

The building was listed on the National Register of Historic Places in 2019.

== See also ==
- National Register of Historic Places listings in Searcy County, Arkansas
