= Mays General Store =

Historic building in Gilbert, Arkansas

- U.S. National Register of Historic Places
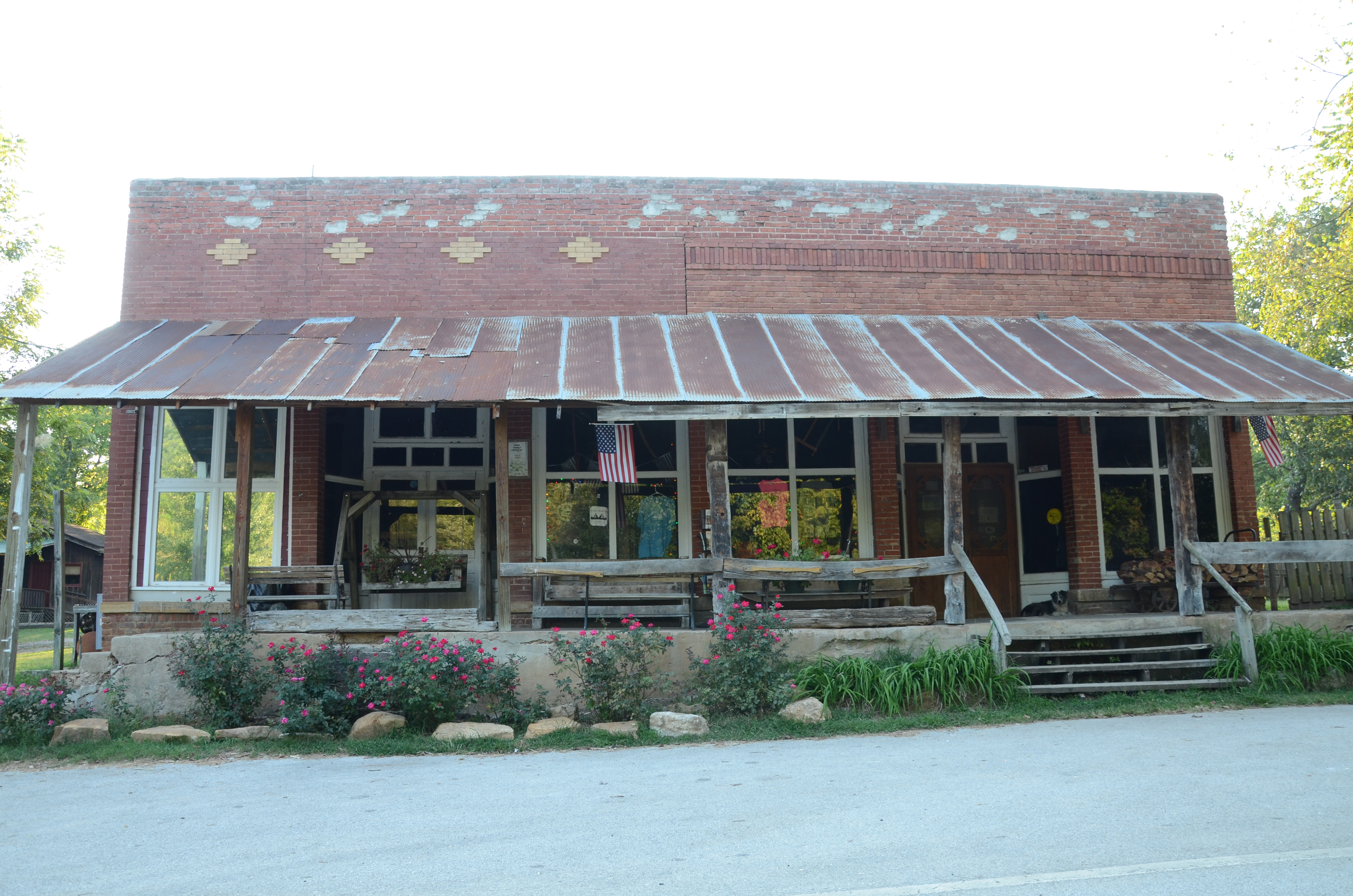

- Location within Arkansas Location within the United States
- Location: Frost St., Gilbert, Arkansas
- Coordinates: 35°59′20″N 92°42′57″W
- Area: less than one acre
- Built: 1901
- NRHP reference No.: 83001166
- Added to NRHP: September 1, 1983

The Mays General Store is a historic commercial building on Frost Street in Gilbert, Arkansas, United States. It is a single-story vernacular brick building, built as two separate buildings in 1901 and 1906, at which time the intervening wall was knocked out. It has two separate storefronts, each with entrances recessed in angled opening, with transom windows above the doors. The interior retains original shelving and wainscoting, as well as display cases and other fixtures. The porch was replaced in the 1930s. It is the last surviving commercial building in the small community, whose business declined after railroads stopped running through town in the 1940s.

The building was listed on the National Register of Historic Places in 1983.

== See also ==
- National Register of Historic Places listings in Searcy County, Arkansas
