= William P. and Rosa Lee Martin Farm =

Historic house in Arkansas, United States

- U.S. National Register of Historic Places
- Location within Arkansas Location within the United States
- Nearest city: Marshall, Arkansas
- Coordinates: 35°56′4″N 92°28′26″W
- Area: 13 acres (5.3 ha)
- Built: 1922
- Architectural style: Plain Traditional
- MPS: Searcy County MPS
- NRHP reference No.: 11000356
- Added to NRHP: June 15, 2011

The William P. and Rosa Lee Martin Farm is a historic farm property in rural Searcy County, Arkansas. It contains all but two of the original buildings of a farmstead established in 1922, representing a remarkably complete collection of outbuildings in addition to the main house. Located on County Road 73 (Campbell Road), just south of Arkansas Highway 74 in the eastern part of the county, it includes the house, a barn, garage, workshop, potato house, corn crib, and wellhouse, all of which were built by the Martins, who worked a 200-acre (81 ha) farm until their deaths in 1971. The buildings have seen generally minor alterations and improvements, a rarity in rural Arkansas where farmsteads of this vintage are often abandoned and demolished.

The property was listed on the National Register of Historic Places in 2011.

== See also ==
- National Register of Historic Places listings in Searcy County, Arkansas
