= W. F. Reeves House =

Historic house in Arkansas, United States

- U.S. National Register of Historic Places
- Location within Arkansas Location within the United States
- Location: Short St., Marshall, Arkansas
- Coordinates: 35°54′48″N 92°38′2″W
- Area: 0 acres (0 ha)
- Built: 1903
- Architect: Reeves, W.F.
- Architectural style: Folk Victorian
- MPS: Searcy County MPS
- NRHP reference No.: 93000977
- Added to NRHP: October 4, 1993

The W. F. Reeves House is a historic house on Short Street in Marshall, Arkansas. It is a 1 1/2-story wood-frame structure, with a central hip-roofed section that has a gabled entry section projecting from the right side of the front facade. A shed-roof porch extends to the left of this section and around to the side, supported by square posts on stone piers. The exterior is adorned by a few Folk Victorian details, including sunbursts in projecting gable sections, and woodwork at the corners of polygonal window bays. The house was built from 1903–04 by W. F. "Frank" Reeves, and is an architecturally distinctive interpretation of the Folk Victorian style.

The house was listed on the National Register of Historic Places in 1993.

== See also ==
- National Register of Historic Places listings in Searcy County, Arkansas
