= Oscar Redman Building =

- U.S. National Register of Historic Places
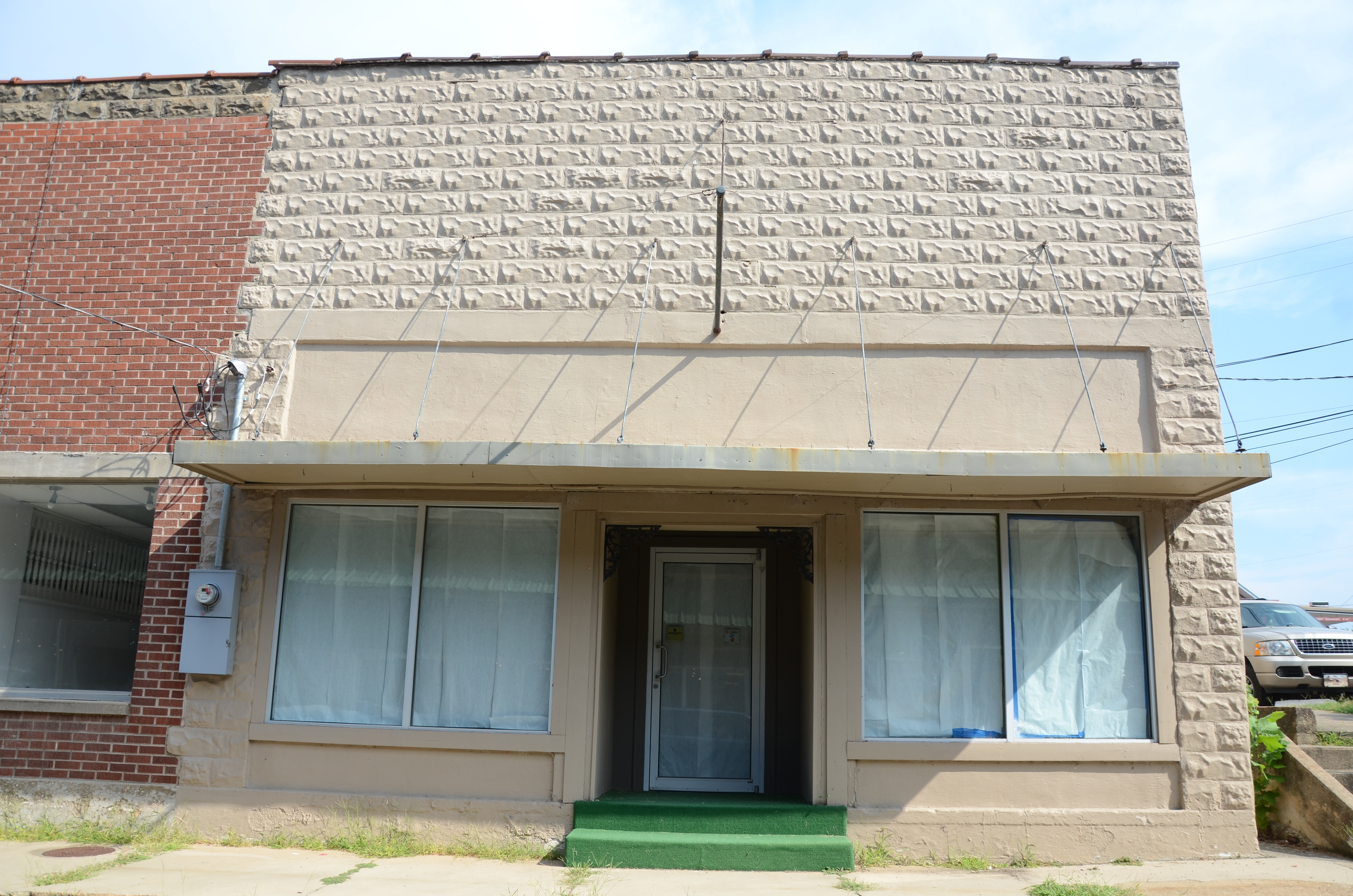

- Location within Arkansas Location within the United States
- Location: 119 E. Main St., Marshall, Arkansas
- Coordinates: 35°54′34″N 92°37′52″W
- Area: less than one acre
- Built: 1920
- Architectural style: Plain Traditional
- MPS: Searcy County MPS
- NRHP reference No.: 93000758
- Added to NRHP: August 18, 1993

The Oscar Redman Building is a historic commercial building at 119 East Main Street in Marshall, Arkansas. It is a simple concrete block structure, one story in height, with a parapet obscuring the flat roof. It has a single storefront, with plate glass windows flanking a recessed entrance. Built in 1920 by Oscar Redman to house his produce business, it typifies the response to declining economic conditions in the area, brought on in part by the advent of Prohibition.

The building was listed on the National Register of Historic Places in 1993.

== See also ==
- National Register of Historic Places listings in Searcy County, Arkansas
