= Bates Tourist Court =

- U.S. National Register of Historic Places
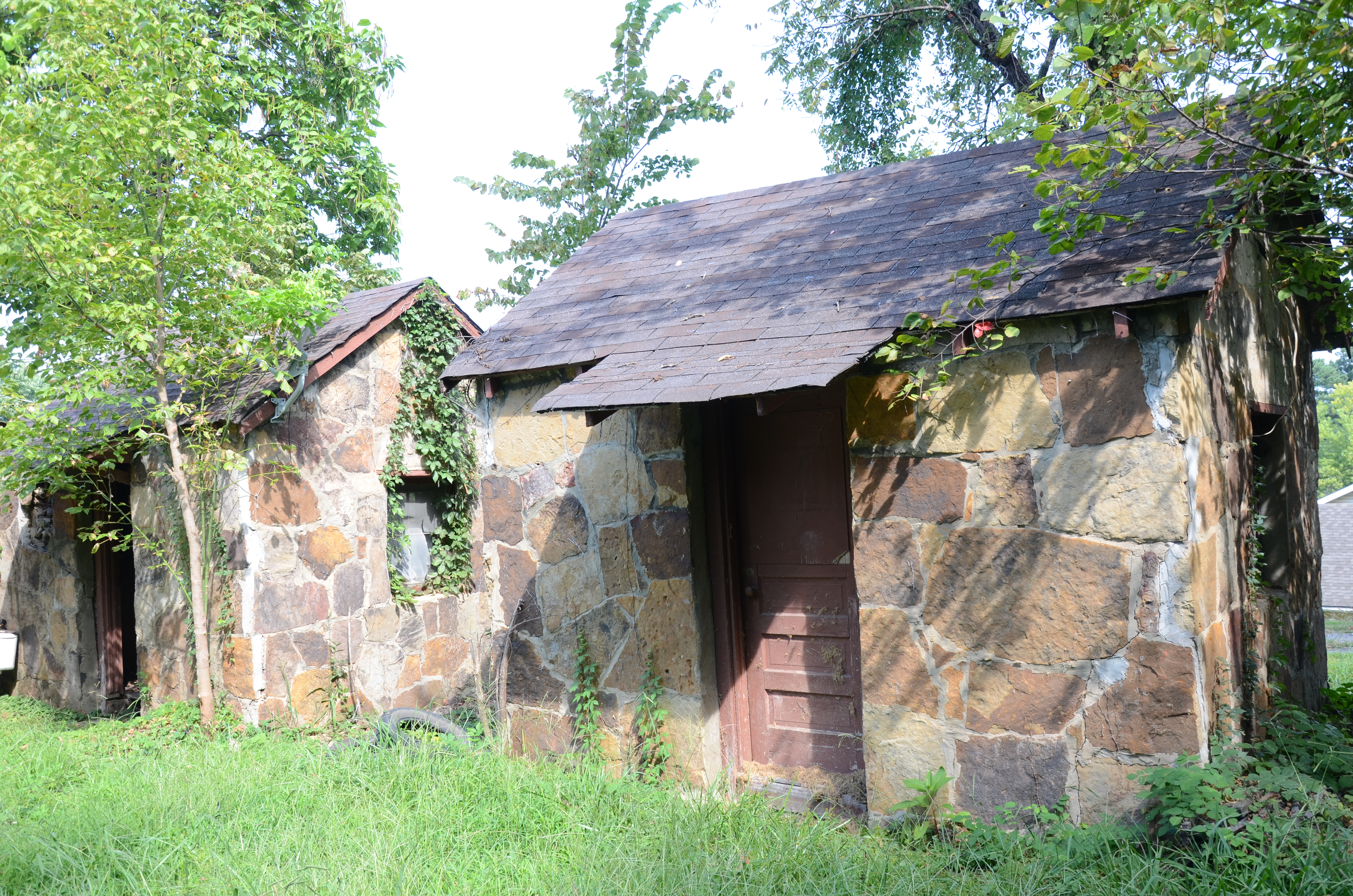

- Location within Arkansas Location within the United States
- Location: Fair St., Marshall, Arkansas
- Coordinates: 35°54′39″N 92°37′56″W
- Area: less than one acre
- Built: 1935
- MPS: Searcy County MPS
- NRHP reference No.: 93000979
- Added to NRHP: October 4, 1993

The Bates Tourist Court is a historic traveler's accommodation on Fair Street in Marshall, Arkansas. The property includes four buildings, three of which are stone-veneered wood-frame cabins. The fourth building, which original housed the office, has been substantially altered since the facility was built about 1935. The property is rare within Searcy County as a surviving example of 1930s road-based tourist architecture.

The property was listed on the National Register of Historic Places in 1993.

== See also ==
- National Register of Historic Places listings in Searcy County, Arkansas
