= Dr. Cleveland Hollabaugh House =

Historic house in Arkansas, United States

- U.S. National Register of Historic Places
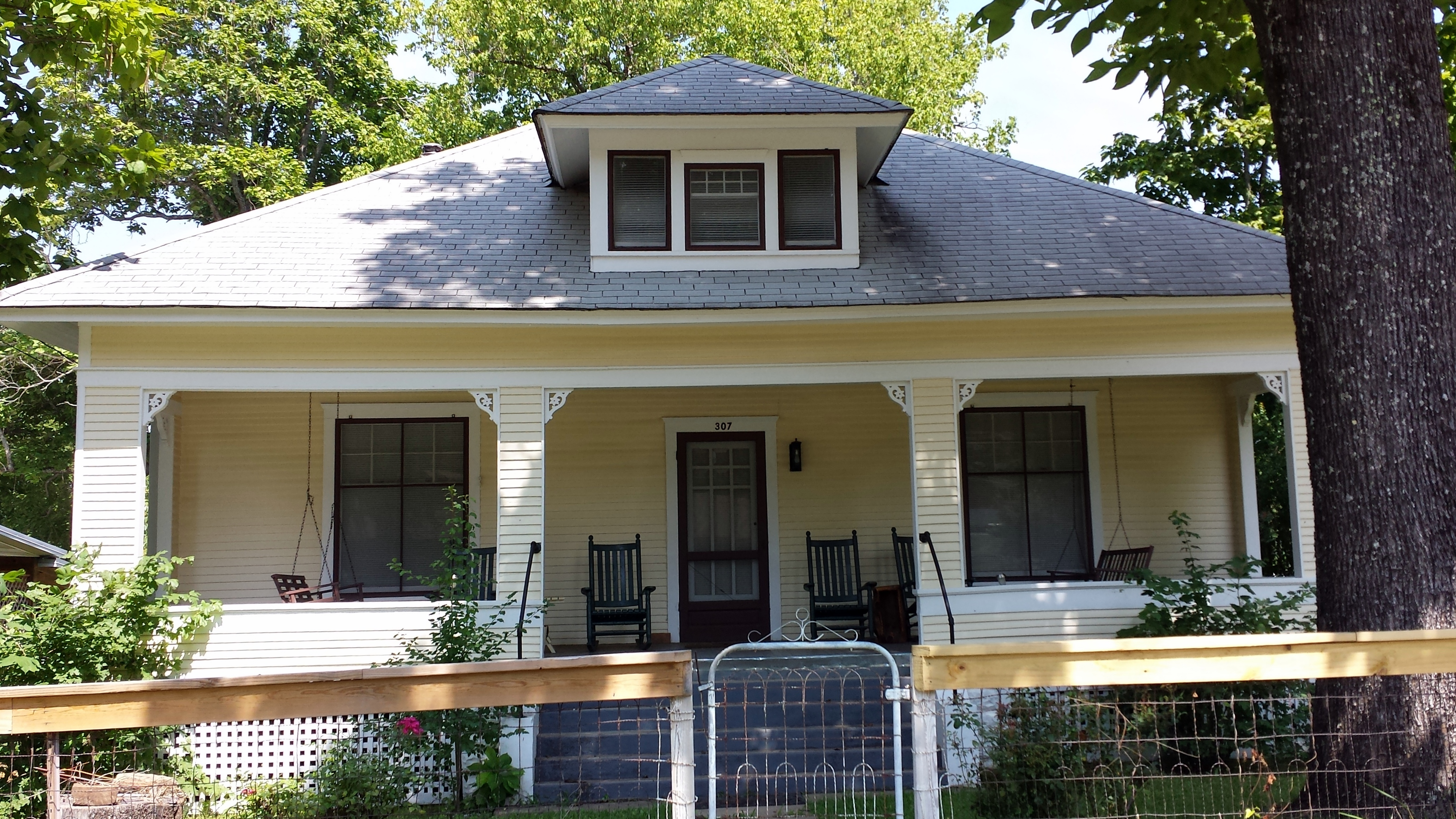

- Location within Arkansas Location within the United States
- Location: Oak St., Leslie, Arkansas
- Coordinates: 35°49′56″N 92°33′34″W
- Area: less than one acre
- Built: 1910
- Architectural style: Bungalow/craftsman
- MPS: Searcy County MPS
- NRHP reference No.: 93001371
- Added to NRHP: December 2, 1993

The Dr. Cleveland Hollabaugh House is a historic house on Oak Street in Leslie, Arkansas. It is a 1 1/2-story wood-frame structure, with a hip roof and weatherboard siding. It is an architecturally eclectic mix of Folk Victorian and Craftsman elements, with gingerbread decoration typical of the former applied to a porch with a basically Craftsman form. The house was built about 1910 for a doctor who primarily served railroad workers.

The house was listed on the National Register of Historic Places in 1993.

== See also ==
- National Register of Historic Places listings in Searcy County, Arkansas
