= Jasper E. Treece Building =

- U.S. National Register of Historic Places
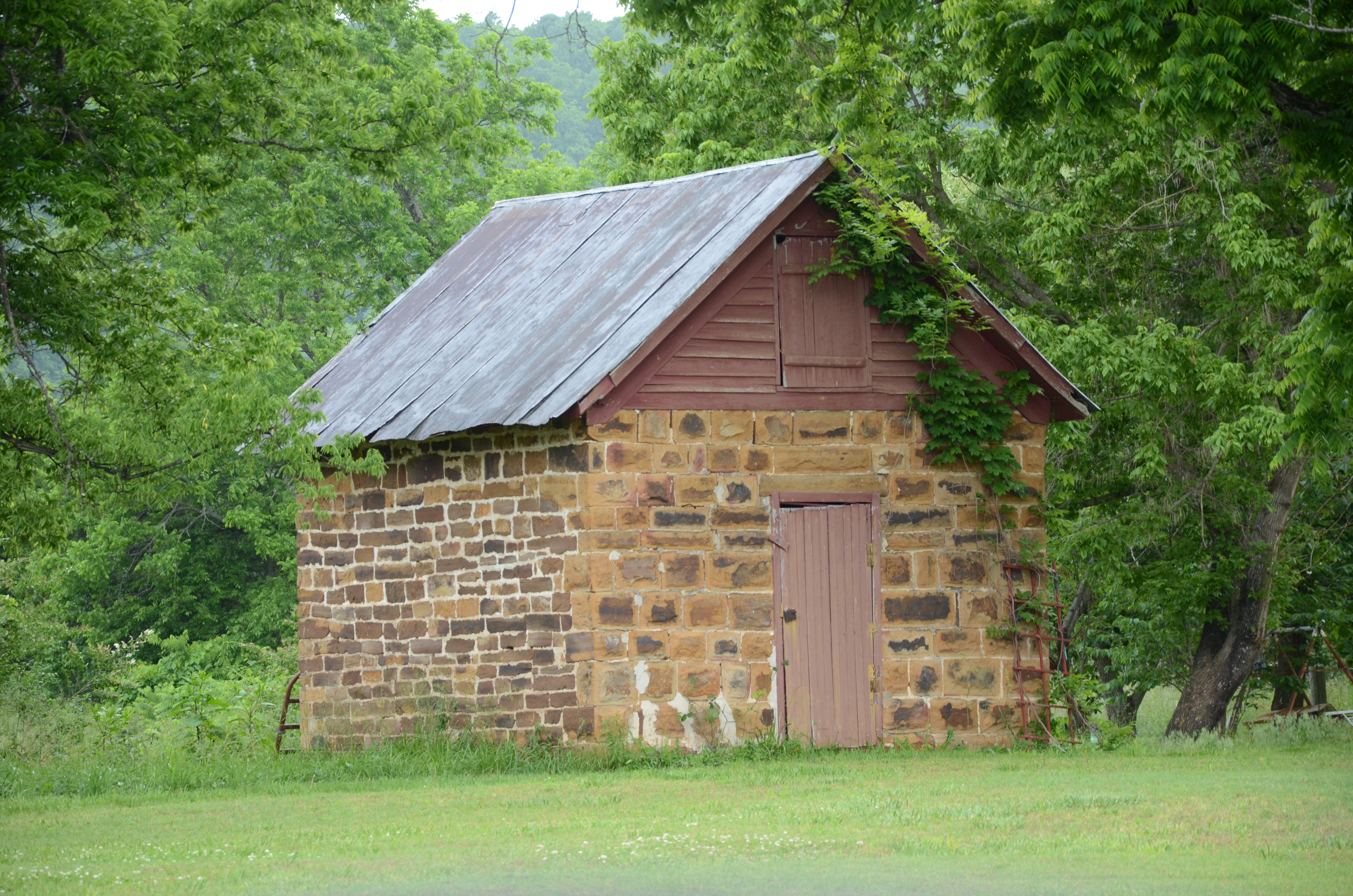

- Location within Arkansas Location within the United States
- Nearest city: Baker, Arkansas
- Coordinates: 35°54′22″N 92°35′43″W
- Area: less than one acre
- Built by: Cypert brothers
- Architectural style: Plain Traditional
- MPS: Searcy County MPS
- NRHP reference No.: 93000754
- Added to NRHP: August 18, 1993

The Jasper E. Treece Building is a historic farm outbuilding in rural eastern Searcy County, Arkansas. It is located on the west side of County Road 55, about 0.5 miles (0.80 km) south of its junction with Arkansas Highway 74. It is a modest single-story stone structure, with a corrugated metal gable roof. The only openings in its walls are the doorway in the eastern facade, which has a wooden plank door, and a small opening on the north side. The walls are eighteen inches thick. The building was built in 1898 for Jasper Treece by the Cypert brothers, local stonemasons, and was intended for use as a storage facility for non-perishable items, with granary space in the attic. It is of unusually high quality for a typically utilitarian structure.

The building was listed on the National Register of Historic Places in 1993.

== See also ==
- National Register of Historic Places listings in Searcy County, Arkansas
