= Old Searcy County Jail =

- U.S. National Register of Historic Places
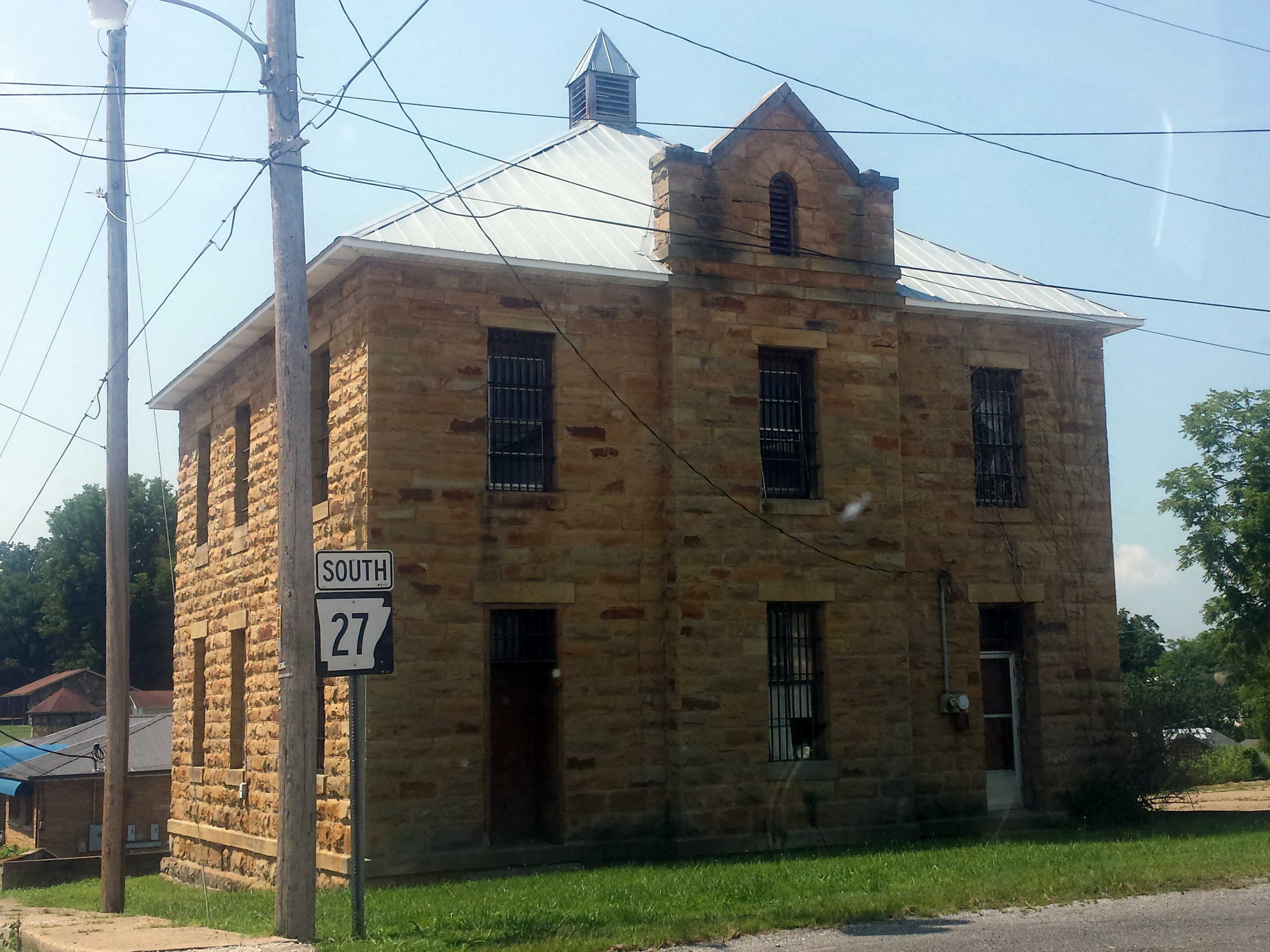

- Location within Arkansas Location within the United States
- Location: State Hwy 27 (Center St), Marshall, Arkansas
- Coordinates: 35°54′43″N 92°37′55″W
- Area: less than one acre
- Built: 1902
- Architect: Ben Henley Sr., Jim Eatherly
- Architectural style: Romanesque
- NRHP reference No.: 10000290
- Added to NRHP: May 28, 2010

The Old Searcy County Jail is a historic building situated on Center Street (Arkansas Highway 27), on the south side of the courthouse square in Marshall, Arkansas. It is a two-story stone structure constructed from local sandstone. The building features a pyramidal roof topped by a cupola. The front facade, three bays wide, has a central bay that projects slightly, rising to a gabled top, with barred windows at each level. The main entrance is recessed in the rightmost bay. The interior of the building includes jailer's quarters on the ground floor and cells on the upper level. Built in 1902, the Old Searcy County Jail was used as a jail until 1976. After its closure as a jail, it briefly served as a museum.

The building was listed on the National Register of Historic Places in 2010.

== See also ==
- National Register of Historic Places listings in Searcy County, Arkansas
