= Bud Fendley House =

Historic house in Arkansas, United States

- U.S. National Register of Historic Places
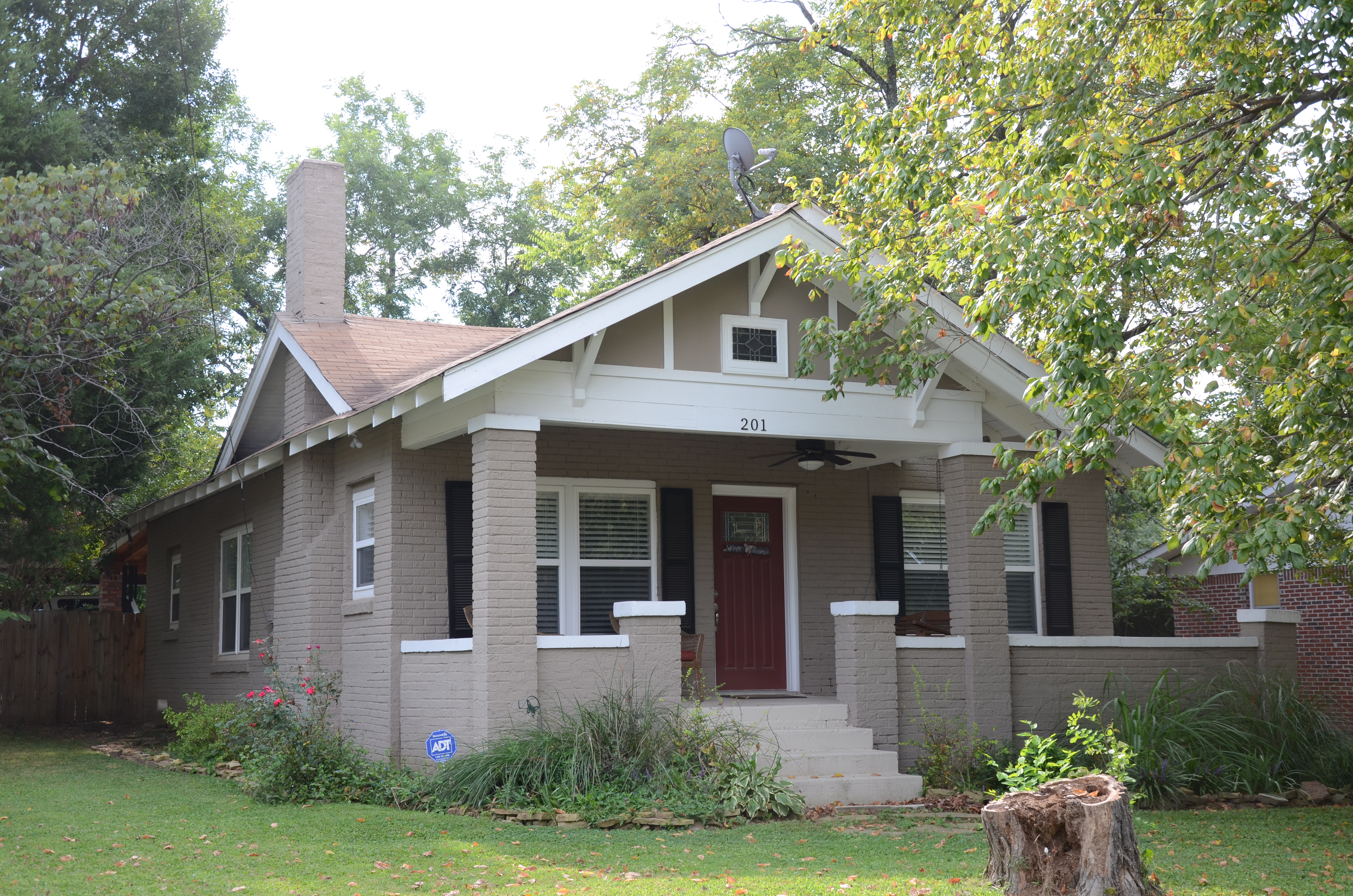

- Location within Arkansas Location within the United States
- Location: 201 Spring St., Marshall, Arkansas
- Coordinates: 35°54′28″N 92°37′45″W
- Area: less than one acre
- Built: 1928
- Architect: Bud Fendley
- Architectural style: Bungalow/craftsman
- MPS: Searcy County MPS
- NRHP reference No.: 93000816
- Added to NRHP: August 18, 1993

The Bud Fendley House is a historic house at 201 Spring Street in Marshall, Arkansas. It is a single-story wood-frame structure, its exterior clad in brick with wooden trim. It has a front-facing gable roof with broad eaves that have exposed rafter ends and large brackets in the Craftsman style. A front porch, supported by brick posts, has similar styling. Built about 1928, it is one of the least-altered examples of Craftsman architecture in the community.

The house was listed on the National Register of Historic Places in 1993.

== See also ==
- National Register of Historic Places listings in Searcy County, Arkansas
