= Cooper's Bluff Site =

Archaeological site in Arkansas, United States

- Cooper's Bluff
- U.S. National Register of Historic Places
- Nearest city: Snowball, Arkansas
- Area: 0.1 acres (0.040 ha)
- MPS: Rock Art Sites in Arkansas TR
- NRHP reference No.: 82002132
- Added to NRHP: May 4, 1982

The Cooper's Bluff Site is a prehistoric panel of pictographs (painted rock art) in Searcy County, Arkansas. Located under a sheltering overhang, it measures about 4.5 by 1.8 metres (14.8 ft × 5.9 ft), and is accompanied by a scatter of prehistoric Native American artifacts. It is estimated to have been painted about 1500 CE.

The site was listed on the National Register of Historic Places in 1982.

== See also ==
- National Register of Historic Places listings in Searcy County, Arkansas
