= Leslie-Rolen House =

Historic house in Arkansas, United States

- U.S. National Register of Historic Places
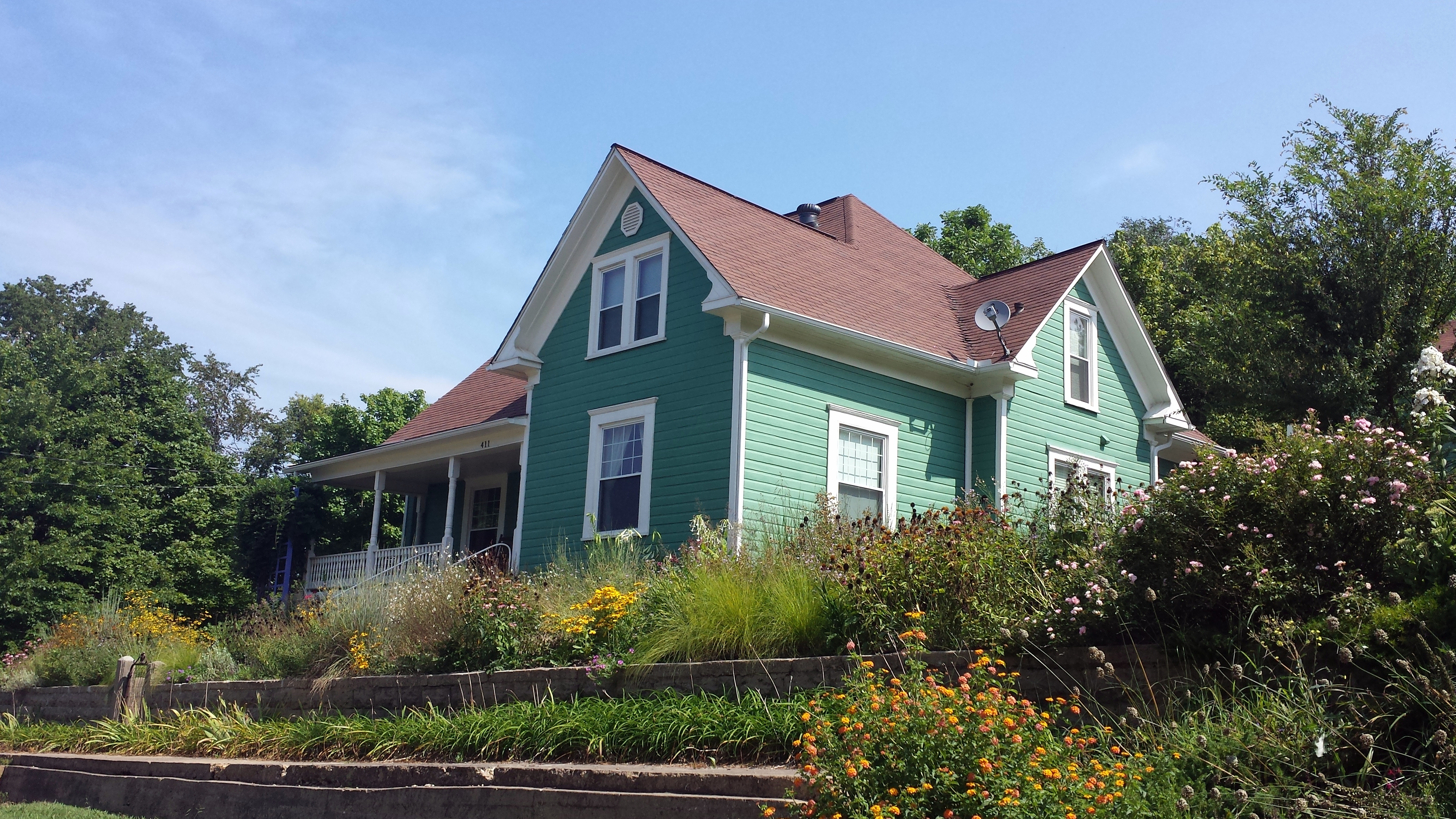

- Location within Arkansas Location within the United States
- Location: Jct. of Cherry and High Sts., Leslie, Arkansas
- Coordinates: 35°49′48″N 92°33′25″W
- Area: less than one acre
- Built: 1907
- Built by: Sam Leslie
- Architectural style: Plain Traditional
- MPS: Searcy County MPS
- NRHP reference No.: 93000815
- Added to NRHP: August 18, 1993

The Leslie-Rolen House is a historic house at Cherry and High Streets in Leslie, Arkansas. It is a 1 1/2-story wood-frame structure, with a simplified vernacular interpretation of Queen Anne styling. It has a complex roofline typical of the style, with cross gables and gable dormers projecting from a nominally hipped roof. Its front porch is supported by spindled turned posts. The house was built in 1907 by Sam Leslie.

The house was listed on the National Register of Historic Places in 1993.

== See also ==
- National Register of Historic Places listings in Searcy County, Arkansas
