= List of places in Arkansas: R =

Arkansas State Seal

This list of current cities, towns, unincorporated communities, and other recognized places in the U.S. state of Arkansas whose name begins with the letter R. It also includes information on the number and names of counties in which the place lies, and its lower and upper zip code bounds, if applicable.

== Cities and Towns ==
Name of place	Number of counties	Principal county	Lower zip code	Upper zip code
Ragan	1	Phillips County		
Raggio	1	Lee County		
Rago	1	Benton County		
Ragsdale	1	Perry County		
Ragtown	1	Montgomery County		
Rally Hill	1	Boone County		
Ralph	1	Marion County	72687	
Ramsey	1	Dallas County	71742	
Ramsey Hill	1	Independence County	72501	
Randall	1	Cleveland County	71665	
Ranger	1	Yell County	72833	
Raspberry	1	Pope County		
Ratcliff	1	Logan County	72951	
Ratio	1	Phillips County	72333	
Ravanna	1	Miller County	75556	
Ravenden	1	Lawrence County	72459	
Ravenden Springs	1	Randolph County	72460	
Rawlinson	1	St. Francis County	72348	
Rawls	1	Ashley County		
Raymond	1	Monroe County	72069	
Reader	2	Nevada County	71726	
Reader	2	Ouachita County	71726	
Readland	1	Chicot County	71640	
Reamey	1	Jackson County		
Rea Valley	1	Marion County	72634	
Rector	1	Clay County	72461	
Red Bank	1	Boone County		
Red Bluff	1	Little River County		
Redding	1	Franklin County		
Redemption	1	Perry County	72016	
Redfern	1	St. Francis County		
Redfield	1	Jefferson County	72132	
Red Fork	1	Desha County	71674	
Red Gate	1	Pulaski County		
Red Gum Farm	1	St. Francis County		
Red Hill	1	Ouachita County		
Redland	1	Nevada County	71857	
Red Leaf	1	Chicot County	71653	
Red Line	1	Mississippi County		
Redman Point	1	Crittenden County		
Red Oak	1	Garland County	71901	
Red Onion	1	Craighead County		
Red Rock	1	Newton County		
Red Springs	1	Clark County	71743	
Red Star	1	Madison County	72752	
Red Wing	1	Sevier County	71832	
Reed	1	Desha County	71670	
Reedville	1	Desha County	71639	
Reese	1	Lee County		
Reeves	1	Newton County		
Reform	1	Saline County		
Relfs Bluff	1	Lincoln County	71667	
Remmel	1	Jackson County	72112	
Rena	1	Crawford County	72956	
Rendezvous	1	Ouachita County		
Republican	1	Faulkner County	72058	
Retta	1	Pope County		
Revel	1	Woodruff County	72006	
Rex	1	Van Buren County	72031	
Reydell	1	Jefferson County	72133	
Reyno	1	Randolph County	72462	
Reynolds	1	Madison County		
Rhea	1	Washington County	72744	
Rhyne	1	Clay County		
Riceville	1	Crittenden County		
Rich	1	Monroe County	72021	
Richardson	1	Jefferson County		
Richland	1	Pulaski County	72206	
Richland View	1	Washington County	72727	
Richmond	1	Little River County	71822	
Rich Mountain	1	Polk County		
Richwood	1	Clark County	71923	
Richwoods	1	Lawrence County		
Ridge	1	Craighead County		
Ridgeway	1	Boone County		
Riffe Ford	1	Clark County		
Riggs	1	Craighead County		
Riley	1	Ashley County		
Rio Vista	1	White County	72010	
Risher	1	Craighead County	72421	
Rison	1	Cleveland County	71665	
Ritchie	1	Union County	71730	
Ritz	1	Scott County		
Riverdale	1	Sebastian County	72941	
River Front	1	Cross County		
River Mountain	1	Logan County	72835	
Riverside	1	Logan County		
Riverside	1	Woodruff County	72101	
Rivervale	1	Poinsett County	72377	
Riverview	1	Conway County	72110	
Rixey	1	Pulaski County	72117	
Roark	1	Ashley County		
Robertsville	1	Conway County	72063	
Robinson	1	Benton County	72761	
Robinwood	1	Pulaski County		
Rob Roy	1	Jefferson County	72004	
Rock	1	Madison County		
Rock Hill	1	Greene County	72450	
Rock Hill	1	Sevier County	71846	
Rockhouse	1	Madison County	72632	
Rock Island Junction	1	Bradley County	71647	
Rock Island Quarters	1	Union County	71730	
Rockport	1	Hot Spring County	72104	
Rock Springs	1	Drew County	71675	
Rock Springs	1	Searcy County	72650	
Rockwell	1	Garland County	71913	
Rocky	1	Mississippi County	72438	
Rocky	1	Polk County	71953	
Rocky Ford	1	Madison County		
Rocky Hill	1	Van Buren County	72629	
Rocky Mound	1	Columbia County	71753	
Rocky Mound	1	Hempstead County	71801	
Rocky Mound	1	Miller County	71837	
Rodney	1	Baxter County	72519	
Roe	1	Monroe County	72134	
Rogers	1	Benton County	72756	72758
Rohwer	1	Desha County	71666	
Rokey	1	Mississippi County		
Roland	1	Pulaski County	72135	
Rolfe Junction	1	Ashley County		
Rolla	1	Hot Spring County	72104	
Romance	1	White County	72136	
Rondo	1	Lee County	72355	
Rondo	1	Miller County	75502	
Rone	1	Jefferson County		
Roosevelt	1	White County		
Rosa	1	Mississippi County	72358	
Rosboro	1	Pike County	71921	
Rose Bud	1	White County	72137	
Rose City	1	Pulaski County	72117	
Rosedale	1	Pulaski County		
Roseland	1	Mississippi County	72442	
Rose Meadow	1	Pulaski County	72206	
Rosetta	1	Johnson County		
Roseville	1	Logan County	72949	
Rosie	1	Independence County	72571	
Ross	1	Pope County	72846	
Rosston	1	Nevada County	71858	
Rotan	1	Mississippi County	72370	
Rottaken	1	Pulaski County		
Roughedge Ford	1	Searcy County		
Round Hill	1	Dallas County	71967	
Round Mountain	1	Conway County	72025	
Round Pond	1	St. Francis County	72378	
Rover	1	Yell County	72860	
Rowell	1	Cleveland County	71665	
Roxton	1	Madison County	72773	
Roy	1	Mississippi County		
Roy	1	Pike County	71852	
Royal	1	Garland County	71968	
Royal Oak	1	Saline County	72103	
Rubicon	1	Saline County		
Rucks Spur	1	Columbia County		
Rudd	1	Carroll County	72616	
Ruddle Mill	1	Independence County	72501	
Rudy	1	Crawford County	72952	
Rule	1	Carroll County	72638	
Rumley	1	Searcy County	72645	
Rupert	1	Van Buren County	72031	
Rush	1	Marion County		
Rushing	1	Stone County	72153	
Russell	1	White County	72139	
Russellville	1	Pope County	72801	72802
Ruth	1	Fulton County		
Rutherford	1	Independence County		
Ryan	1	Lonoke County	72046	
Rye	1	Cleveland County	71665	
Rye Hill	1	Sebastian County	72906	
Ryker	1	Newton County		

== Townships ==
Name of place	Number of counties	Principal county	Lower zip code	Upper zip code
Randolph Township	1	Desha County		
Rankin Township	1	Perry County		
Raymond Township	1	Monroe County		
Red Colony Township	1	Sevier County		
Red Fork Township	1	Desha County		
Red Hill Township	1	Ouachita County		
Redland Township	1	Cleveland County		
Redland Township	1	Hempstead County		
Redland Township	1	Nevada County		
Red Lick Township	1	Johnson County		
Red River Township	1	Little River County		
Red River Township	1	Miller County		
Red River Township	1	Searcy County		
Red River Township	1	Stone County		
Red River Township	1	Van Buren County		
Red River Township	1	White County		
Red Stripe Township	1	Stone County		
Reed Township	1	Washington County		
Reed Keathly Township	1	Yell County		
Reeds Creek Township	1	Lawrence County		
Relief Township	1	Independence County		
Revilee Township	1	Logan County		
Reyno Township	1	Randolph County		
Reynolds Township	1	Greene County		
Rheas Mill Township	1	Washington County		
Richardson Township	1	Randolph County		
Richland Township	1	Crawford County		
Richland Township	1	Desha County		
Richland Township	1	Jefferson County		
Richland Township	1	Lee County		
Richland Township	1	Little River County		
Richland Township	1	Madison County		
Richland Township	1	Monroe County		
Richland Township	1	Newton County		
Richland Township	1	Searcy County		
Richland Township	1	Washington County		
Richland Township	1	Yell County		
Rich Mountain Township	1	Polk County		
Richwoods Township	1	Jackson County		
Richwoods Township	1	Lawrence County		
Richwoods Township	1	Lonoke County		
Richwoods Township	1	Sharp County		
Richwoods Township	1	Stone County		
Riley Township	1	Yell County		
Rison Township	1	Cleveland County		
River Township	1	Bradley County		
River Township	1	Calhoun County		
River Township	1	Grant County		
River Township	1	Logan County		
River Township	1	Ouachita County		
Roane Township	1	Lafayette County		
Roanoke Township	1	Randolph County		
Roasting Ear Township	1	Stone County		
Roberts Township	1	Jefferson County		
Rock Creek Township	1	Searcy County		
Roc Roe Township	1	Monroe County		
Roc Roe Township	1	Prairie County		
Rogers Township	1	Sebastian County		
Roller Ridge Township	1	Benton County		
Rose Creek Township	1	Perry County		
Roseville Township	1	Logan County		
Rosie Township	1	Independence County		
Round Prairie Township	1	Benton County		
Rover Township	1	Yell County		
Rowell Township	1	Cleveland County		
Royal Township	1	White County		
Ruddell Township	1	Independence County		
Rudy Township	1	Crawford County		
Running Lake Township	1	Randolph County		
Russell Township	1	Lafayette County		
Russell Township	1	White County		
