= List of places in Arkansas: P =

Arkansas State Seal

This list of current cities, towns, unincorporated communities, and other recognized places in the U.S. state of Arkansas whose name begins with the letter P. It also includes information on the number and names of counties in which the place lies, and its lower and upper zip code bounds, if applicable.

== Cities and Towns ==
Name of place	Number of counties	Principal county	Lower zip code	Upper zip code
Pace City	1	Ouachita County	71751	
Palarm	1	Faulkner County		
Palatka	1	Clay County	72422	
Palestine	1	St. Francis County	72372	
Palmer	1	Monroe County	72069	
Palmyra	1	Lincoln County	71667	
Pangburn	1	White County	72121	
Pankey	1	Pulaski County	72207	
Pankov	1	Little River County		
Pansy	1	Cleveland County	71665	
Panther Forest	1	Chicot County	71653	
Paradise	1	Franklin County		
Paragould	1	Greene County	72450	
Paragould Junction	1	Greene County	72450	
Paraloma	1	Sevier County	71846	
Paris	1	Logan County	72855	
Parkdale	1	Ashley County	71661	
Parker Ford	1	Madison County		
Parkers	1	Pulaski County		
Parkers Chapel	1	Union County	71730	
Parkers-Iron Springs	1	Pulaski County		
Park Grove	1	Monroe County		
Park Hill	1	Pulaski County	72116	
Parkin	1	Cross County	72373	
Park Place	1	Lee County	72320	
Parks	1	Scott County	72950	
Parma	1	Stone County	72044	
Parnell	1	Lonoke County	72023	
Paron	1	Saline County	72122	
Paroquet	1	Independence County		
Partain	1	Cleburne County		
Partee	1	Columbia County	71753	
Parthenon	1	Newton County	72666	
Pastoria	1	Jefferson County	72152	
Patmos	1	Hempstead County	71801	
Patoka	1	Crittenden County		
Patrick	1	Madison County	72727	
Patsville	1	Bradley County	71647	
Patterson	1	Clay County		
Patterson	1	Sebastian County		
Patterson	1	Woodruff County	72123	
Pattonville	1	Independence County		
Pattsville	1	Bradley County		
Pauls	1	Craighead County	72416	
Pauls Switch	1	Craighead County		
Paup	1	Miller County		
Pawheen	1	Mississippi County	72438	
Payne	1	Union County	71765	
Payneway	1	Poinsett County	72472	
Peach Orchard	1	Clay County	72453	
Peanut	1	Franklin County		
Pearcy	1	Garland County	71964	
Pea Ridge	1	Benton County	72751	
Pea Ridge	1	Desha County		
Pea Ridge National Military Park	1	Benton County	72751	
Pearson	1	Cleburne County	72131	
Pearson	1	Union County		
Pecan Grove	1	Pulaski County		
Pecan Point	1	Mississippi County	72350	
Pedro	1	Benton County		
Peel	1	Marion County	72668	
Peiser Spur	1	Pulaski County		
Pelsor	1	Pope County	72856	
Pencil Bluff	1	Montgomery County	71965	
Pendleton	1	Desha County	71639	
Penjur	1	St. Francis County		
Pennington	1	Jackson County	72005	
Pennys	1	Sevier County	71846	
Penrose	1	Woodruff County	72397	
Perkins	1	Howard County		
Perla	1	Hot Spring County	72104	
Perry	1	Perry County	72125	
Perrytown	1	Hempstead County	71801	
Perryville	1	Perry County	72126	
Peterpender	1	Franklin County	72933	
Peters	1	Lee County		
Petit Jean	1	Pope County		
Pettigrew	1	Madison County	72752	
Pettus	1	Lonoke County	72086	
Pettyview	1	Garland County	71919	
Pettyville	1	Mississippi County	72442	
Peytonville	1	Little River County		
Pfeiffer	1	Independence County		
Phenix	1	Lincoln County		
Philadelphia	1	Columbia County	71753	
Philadelphia	1	Craighead County	72401	
Philander Smith College	1	Pulaski County	72203	
Phillips	1	Craighead County		
Phillips Bayou	1	Lee County	72360	
Pickens	1	Desha County	71662	
Pickens	1	White County	72143	
Piercetown	1	Newton County	72641	
Piggott	1	Clay County	72454	
Pike	1	Pike County	71940	
Pike City	1	Pike County		
Pike Junction	1	Clark County		
Pilgrims Rest	1	Phillips County		
Pilgrims Rest	1	Washington County	72764	
Pillar	1	Phillips County		
Pinckney	1	Crittenden County	72348	
Pindall	1	Searcy County	72669	
Pinebergen	1	Jefferson County		
Pine Bluff	1	Jefferson County	71601	71613
Pine Bluff Arsenal	1	Jefferson County	71611	
Pine Bluff Southeast	1	Jefferson County	71601	
Pine City	1	Monroe County	72069	
Pinecrest	1	Jefferson County	71601	
Pine Grove	1	Dallas County	71763	
Pine Grove Valley	1	Scott County	72944	
Pine Haven	1	Saline County		
Pine Ridge	1	Montgomery County	71966	
Pine Top	1	Benton County		
Pinetree	1	St. Francis County		
Pine Valley	1	Independence County	72521	
Pineville	1	Izard County	72566	
Piney	1	Franklin County		
Piney	1	Garland County	71901	
Piney	1	Johnson County	72847	
Piney	1	Pope County	72847	
Piney Grove	1	Lafayette County	71845	
Piney Grove	1	Pike County	71940	
Pinnacle	1	Pulaski County		
Pinnacle	1	Pulaski County	72135	
Pisgah	1	Pike County	71940	
Pisgah	1	Yell County	72834	
Pitman	1	Randolph County	72444	
Pittinger	1	Cross County		
Pitts	1	Poinsett County	72421	
Pittston Junction	1	Franklin County		
Plainfield	1	Columbia County	71740	
Plainview	1	Logan County		
Plainview	1	White County	72081	
Plainview	1	Yell County	72857	
Plant	1	Van Buren County	72031	
Plantersville	1	Drew County		
Plata	1	Montgomery County		
Pleasant Grove	1	Craighead County	72401	
Pleasant Grove	1	Stone County	72567	
Pleasant Grove	1	Van Buren County	72030	
Pleasant Hill	1	Conway County		
Pleasant Hill	1	Crawford County	72947	
Pleasant Hill	1	Cross County	72396	
Pleasant Hill	1	Garland County	71901	
Pleasant Hill	1	Logan County		
Pleasant Hill	1	Nevada County	71857	
Pleasant Hill	1	Yell County		
Pleasant Hills	1	Stone County	72663	
Pleasant Plains	1	Independence County	72568	
Pleasant Ridge	1	Boone County		
Pleasant Ridge	1	Carroll County		
Pleasant Valley	1	Carroll County		
Pleasant Valley	1	Faulkner County	72058	
Pleasant Valley	1	Izard County		
Pleasant Valley	1	Lafayette County	71826	
Pleasant Valley	1	Perry County	72016	
Pleasant Valley	1	Pope County		
Pleasant Valley	1	Pulaski County		
Pleasant View	1	Franklin County	72949	
Pleasure Heights	1	Benton County	72745	
Pless	1	Pope County		
Plum Bayou	1	Jefferson County	72182	
Plumerville	1	Conway County	72127	
Plunketts	1	Prairie County	72017	
Pocahontas	1	Randolph County	72455	
Point Cedar	1	Hot Spring County	71921	
Point Peter	1	Searcy County		
Pollard	1	Clay County	72456	
Ponca	1	Newton County	72670	
Ponders	1	Lawrence County		
Pontoon	1	Conway County	72025	
Poping	1	Franklin County		
Poplar Grove	1	Phillips County	72374	
Poplar Ridge	1	Craighead County		
Portia	1	Lawrence County	72457	
Portland	1	Ashley County	71663	
Posey	1	St. Francis County	72392	
Possum Fork	1	Desha County	71666	
Possum Grape	1	Jackson County	72020	
Possum Trot	1	Conway County		
Postelle	1	Phillips County	72366	
Potter	1	Polk County	71953	
Potter Junction	1	Polk County	71953	
Pottsville	1	Pope County	72858	
Poughkeepsie	1	Sharp County	72569	
Powell	1	Marion County		
Powers	1	Hempstead County		
Powhatan	1	Lawrence County	72458	
Poyen	1	Grant County	72128	
Prague	1	Grant County	72150	
Prairie Creek	1	Benton County		
Prairie Creek	1	Sebastian County	72938	
Prairie Grove	1	Washington County	72753	
Prairie View	1	Logan County	72863	
Prattsville	1	Grant County	72129	
Prescott	1	Nevada County	71857	
Presley	1	Crittenden County		
Presley Junction	1	Crittenden County		
Preston	1	Faulkner County	72032	
Preston Ferry	1	Arkansas County	72134	
Preston Place	1	Phillips County		
Price	1	Garland County	71901	
Price	1	Marion County	72661	
Price Ford	1	Cleburne County		
Prim	1	Cleburne County	72130	
Princedale	1	Cross County		
Princeton	1	Dallas County	71725	
Process City	1	Sevier County	71832	
Proctor	1	Crittenden County	72376	
Promised Land	1	Poinsett County	72472	
Pronton	1	Conway County		
Prosperity	1	Boone County		
Prosperity	1	Yell County		
Protho Junction	1	Pulaski County		
Providence	1	White County	72081	
Provo	1	Sevier County	71846	
Pruitt	1	Newton County	72648	
Pryor	1	White County		
Pugh	1	Ashley County		
Pulaski	1	Pulaski County		
Pulaski Heights	1	Pulaski County		
Pullman	1	Sevier County	71832	
Pumpkin Bend	1	Woodruff County	72101	
Purdy	1	Madison County	72740	
Puryear	1	Scott County		
Pyatt	1	Marion County	72672	

== Townships ==
Name of place	Number of counties	Principal county	Lower zip code	Upper zip code
Packard Springs Township	1	Carroll County		
Palarm Township	1	Faulkner County		
Palestine Township	1	Bradley County		
Paraclifta Township	1	Sevier County		
Parker Township	1	Nevada County		
Parks Township	1	Montgomery County		
Parks Township	1	Scott County		
Pastoria Township	1	Jefferson County		
Payne Township	1	Clay County		
Pecan Point Township	1	Mississippi County		
Pencil Bluff Township	1	Montgomery County		
Pennington Township	1	Bradley County		
Perry Township	1	Johnson County		
Perry Township	1	Perry County		
Peter Creek Township	1	Cleburne County		
Petit Jean Township	1	Conway County		
Petit Jean Township	1	Logan County		
Petit Jean Township	1	Perry County		
Pettus Township	1	Lonoke County		
Phillips Township	1	Garland County		
Phoenix Township	1	Pope County		
Pickens Township	1	Cleburne County		
Pigeon Township	1	Baxter County		
Pike City Township	1	Pike County		
Pilot Rock Township	1	Johnson County		
Pine Township	1	Cleburne County		
Pine Log Township	1	Benton County		
Pine Mountain Township	1	Faulkner County		
Pine Ridge Township	1	Monroe County		
Piney Township	1	Carroll County		
Piney Township	1	Cleburne County		
Piney Township	1	Johnson County		
Piney Fork Township	1	Sharp County		
Pittsburg Township	1	Johnson County		
Planters Township	1	Chicot County		
Pleasant Hill Township	1	Izard County		
Pleasant Hill Township	1	Newton County		
Pleasant Ridge Township	1	Fulton County		
Plum Bayou Township	1	Jefferson County		
Plumlee Township	1	Newton County		
Poff Township	1	Cleburne County		
Point Township	1	Woodruff County		
Point Deluce Township	1	Arkansas County		
Poland Township	1	Greene County		
Polk Township	1	Calhoun County		
Polk Township	1	Montgomery County		
Polk Township	1	Newton County		
Pollard Township	1	Clay County		
Polo Township	1	Carroll County		
Ponca Township	1	Newton County		
Porter Township	1	Crawford County		
Portland Township	1	Ashley County		
Potter Township	1	Polk County		
Powell Township	1	Craighead County		
Prairie Township	1	Arkansas County		
Prairie Township	1	Ashley County		
Prairie Township	1	Boone County		
Prairie Township	1	Carroll County		
Prairie Township	1	Craighead County		
Prairie Township	1	Franklin County		
Prairie Township	1	Hot Spring County		
Prairie Township	1	Johnson County		
Prairie Township	1	Lonoke County		
Prairie Township	1	Madison County		
Prairie Township	1	Marion County		
Prairie Township	1	Newton County		
Prairie Township	1	St. Francis County		
Prairie Township	1	Searcy County		
Prairie Township	1	Sebastian County		
Prairie Township	1	Washington County		
Prairie Township	1	Yell County		
Prairie Grove Township	1	Washington County		
Price Township	1	Washington County		
Princeton Township	1	Dallas County		
Proctor Township	1	Crittenden County		
Promised Land Township	1	Craighead County		
Promised Land Township	1	Lawrence County		
Pulaski Township	1	Lonoke County		
Pumpkin Bend Township	1	Woodruff County		
Purdy Township	1	Madison County		
