= Bear Creek Township, Arkansas =

Bear Creek Township, Arkansas may refer to:

- Bear Creek Township, Boone County, Arkansas (former township)
- Bear Creek Township, Sevier County, Arkansas
- Bear Creek No. 4 Township, Searcy County, Arkansas
- Bear Creek No. 5 Township, Searcy County, Arkansas
- Bear Creek No. 6 Township, Searcy County, Arkansas

== See also ==
- List of townships in Arkansas
- Bear Creek Township (disambiguation)
