= Bear Creek Township =

Bear Creek Township may refer to:

== Arkansas ==
- Bear Creek Township, Boone County, Arkansas, defunct
- Bear Creek Township, Sevier County, Arkansas
- Bear Creek No. 4 Township, Searcy County, Arkansas
- Bear Creek No. 5 Township, Searcy County, Arkansas
- Bear Creek No. 6 Township, Searcy County, Arkansas

== Illinois ==
- Bear Creek Township, Christian County, Illinois
- Bear Creek Township, Hancock County, Illinois

== Indiana ==
- Bearcreek Township, Jay County, Indiana

== Iowa ==
- Bear Creek Township, Poweshiek County, Iowa

== Kansas ==
- Bear Creek Township, Hamilton County, Kansas

== Michigan ==
- Bear Creek Township, Michigan

== Minnesota ==
- Bear Creek Township, Clearwater County, Minnesota

== Missouri ==
- Bear Creek Township, Henry County, Missouri
- Bear Creek Township, Montgomery County, Missouri

== North Carolina ==
- Bear Creek Township, North Carolina

== North Dakota ==
- Bear Creek Township, Dickey County, North Dakota, in Dickey County, North Dakota

== Pennsylvania ==
- Bear Creek Township, Pennsylvania
