= Prairie Township, Arkansas =

Prairie Township, Arkansas may refer to:

- Prairie Township, Arkansas County, Arkansas
- Prairie Township, Ashley County, Arkansas
- Prairie Township, Boone County, Arkansas
- Prairie Township, Carroll County, Arkansas
- Prairie Township, Craighead County, Arkansas
- Prairie Township, Franklin County, Arkansas
- Prairie Township, Hot Spring County, Arkansas
- Prairie Township, Johnson County, Arkansas
- Prairie Township, Lonoke County, Arkansas
- Prairie Township, Madison County, Arkansas
- Prairie Township, Marion County, Arkansas
- Prairie Township, Newton County, Arkansas
- Prairie Township, St. Francis County, Arkansas
- Prairie Township, Searcy County, Arkansas
- Prairie Township, Sebastian County, Arkansas
- Prairie Township, Washington County, Arkansas
- Prairie Township, Yell County, Arkansas

== See also ==
- List of townships in Arkansas
- Prairie Township (disambiguation)
