= St. Joe station =

- St. Joe Missouri and North Arkansas Railroad Depot
- U.S. National Register of Historic Places
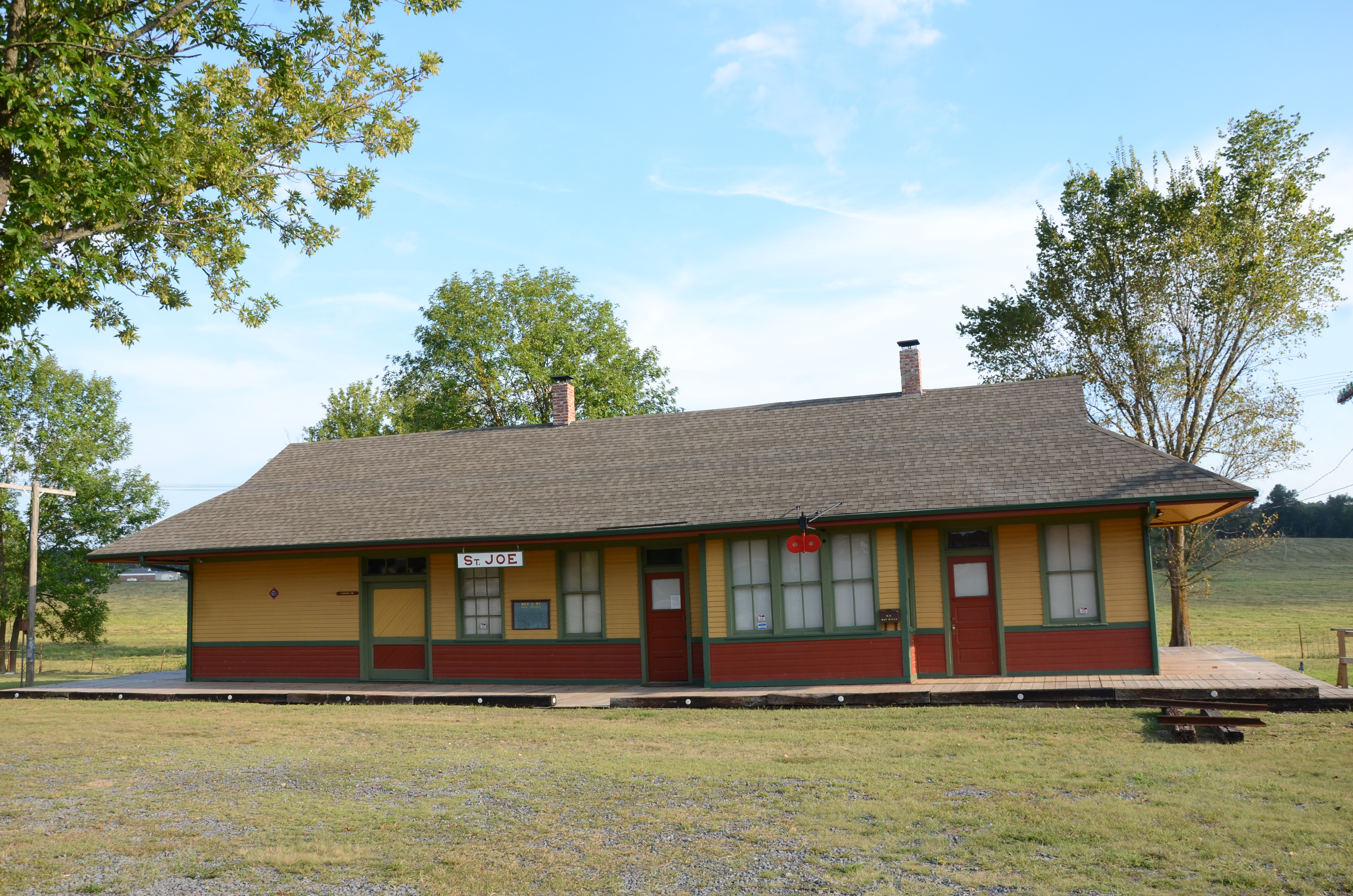

- Location within Arkansas Location within the United States
- Location: US 65, S side, St. Joe, Arkansas
- Coordinates: 36°1′47″N 92°48′9″W
- Area: less than one acre
- Built: 1912
- Architectural style: Plain Traditional
- MPS: Historic Railroad Depots of Arkansas MPS
- NRHP reference No.: 93000988
- Added to NRHP: September 16, 1993

The St. Joe Missouri and North Arkansas Railroad Depot is a historic railroad station on the south side of United States Route 65 in the center of St. Joe, Arkansas. It is a typical long rectangular building, with a gable-on-hip roof, and a telegrapher's booth projecting out the north (originally track-facing) side. Built in about 1912 by the Missouri and North Arkansas Railroad, it is the only one of that railroad's wood-frame depots to survive in the state, and is the only railroad depot in Searcy County in its original location. The town of St. Joe was incorporated in 1902 as a railroad town.

The building was listed on the National Register of Historic Places in 1993.

== See also ==
- National Register of Historic Places listings in Searcy County, Arkansas
