= Tomahawk Township, Searcy County, Arkansas =

Tomahawk Township
- Township
- Location in Arkansas
- Coordinates: 36°2′13″N 92°42′57″W
- Country: United States
- State: Arkansas
- County: Searcy

Area
  - Total: 54.183 sq mi (140.33 km^{2})
  - Land: 53.762 sq mi (139.24 km^{2})
  - Water: 0.421 sq mi (1.09 km^{2})

Population (2010)
  - Total: 574
  - Density: 10.68/sq mi (4.12/km^{2})
- Time zone: UTC-6 (CST)
  - Summer (DST): UTC-5 (CDT)
- Zip Code: 72636 (Gilbert), 72675 (St. Joe)
- Area code: 870

Tomahawk Township is one of fifteen current townships in Searcy County, Arkansas, USA. As of the 2010 census, its total population was 574.

== Geography ==
According to the United States Census Bureau, Tomahawk Township covers an area of 54.183 square miles (140.33 km^{2}); 53.762 square miles (139.24 km^{2}) of land and 0.421 square miles (1.09 km^{2}) of water.

=== Cities, towns, and villages ===
- Gilbert
- St. Joe (part)
