= Point Peter =

Point Peter may refer to:

- Point Peter, Arkansas, an unincorporated community
- Point Peter, Georgia, an unincorporated community
- Point Peter Creek, a stream in Georgia
