= Retta (disambiguation) =

Retta (born 1970) is an American stand-up comedian and actress.

Retta may also refer to:

== People ==
=== Given name ===
- Retta Davidson (1921–1998), American animator
- Retta T. Matthews (1856–1899), American painter and sculptor
- Retta Scott (1916–1990), American animator and illustrator
- Retta Ward (1953–2016), American health advocate
- Retta Young (born 1949), American singer

=== Surname ===
- Joe Retta, front man and vocalist of British glam rock band The Sweet
- Seifu Retta (born 1954), Ethiopian boxer

== Other uses ==
- Retta, Arkansas, a community in the United States
- Retta Dixon Home, an institution for Aboriginal children in Darwin, Northern Territory, Australia
- Retta language, spoken in parts of the Indonesian Archipelago
- Retta Nagala, a village in Muzaffarnagar, Uttar Pradesh, India

== See also ==
- Rettah Chess, a variant of chess invented by V.R. Parton
- Reta (disambiguation)
