= Bear Creek Township, Illinois =

Bear Creek Township, Illinois may refer to the following places:

- Bear Creek Township, Christian County, Illinois
- Bear Creek Township, Hancock County, Illinois

See also

- Bear Creek Township (disambiguation)
