= Prairie Township =

Prairie Township may refer to:

== Arkansas ==
- Prairie Township, Arkansas County, Arkansas, in Arkansas County, Arkansas
- Prairie Township, Ashley County, Arkansas, in Ashley County, Arkansas
- Prairie Township, Boone County, Arkansas
- Prairie Township, Carroll County, Arkansas
- Prairie Township, Craighead County, Arkansas, in Craighead County, Arkansas
- Prairie Township, Franklin County, Arkansas, in Franklin County, Arkansas
- Prairie Township, Hot Spring County, Arkansas, in Hot Spring County, Arkansas
- Prairie Township, Johnson County, Arkansas, in Johnson County, Arkansas
- Prairie Township, Lonoke County, Arkansas, in Lonoke County, Arkansas
- Prairie Township, Madison County, Arkansas
- Prairie Township, Newton County, Arkansas, in Newton County, Arkansas
- Prairie Township, St. Francis County, Arkansas, in St. Francis County, Arkansas
- Prairie Township, Searcy County, Arkansas
- Prairie Township, Sebastian County, Arkansas, in Sebastian County, Arkansas
- Prairie Township, Washington County, Arkansas
- Prairie Township, Yell County, Arkansas, in Yell County, Arkansas

== Illinois ==
- Prairie Township, Crawford County, Illinois
- Prairie Township, Edgar County, Illinois
- Prairie Township, Hancock County, Illinois
- Prairie Township, Shelby County, Illinois

== Indiana ==
- Prairie Township, Henry County, Indiana
- Prairie Township, Kosciusko County, Indiana
- Prairie Township, LaPorte County, Indiana
- Prairie Township, Tipton County, Indiana
- Prairie Township, Warren County, Indiana
- Prairie Township, White County, Indiana

== Iowa ==
- Prairie Township, Davis County, Iowa
- Prairie Township, Delaware County, Iowa
- Prairie Township, Fremont County, Iowa
- Prairie Township, Keokuk County, Iowa
- Prairie Township, Kossuth County, Iowa
- Prairie Township, Mahaska County, Iowa

== Kansas ==
- Prairie Township, Jewell County, Kansas
- Prairie Township, Wilson County, Kansas

== Missouri ==
- Prairie Township, Audrain County, Missouri
- Prairie Township, Bates County, Missouri
- Prairie Township, Carroll County, Missouri
- Prairie Township, Franklin County, Missouri
- Prairie Township, Howard County, Missouri
- Prairie Township, Jackson County, Missouri
- Prairie Township, Lincoln County, Missouri
- Prairie Township, McDonald County, Missouri
- Prairie Township, Montgomery County, Missouri
- Prairie Township, Pettis County, Missouri
- Prairie Township, Randolph County, Missouri
- Prairie Township, Schuyler County, Missouri

== Nebraska ==
- Prairie Township, Phelps County, Nebraska

== North Dakota ==
- Prairie Township, LaMoure County, North Dakota, in LaMoure County, North Dakota

== Ohio ==
- Prairie Township, Franklin County, Ohio
- Prairie Township, Holmes County, Ohio

== South Dakota ==
- Prairie Township, Union County, South Dakota, in Union County, South Dakota
