= St. Joe Township, Searcy County, Arkansas =

St. Joe Township
- Township
- Location in Arkansas
- Coordinates: 35°59′13″N 92°51′15″W
- Country: United States
- State: Arkansas
- County: Searcy

Area
  - Total: 30.077 sq mi (77.90 km^{2})
  - Land: 29.838 sq mi (77.28 km^{2})
  - Water: 0.239 sq mi (0.62 km^{2})

Population (2010)
  - Total: 390
  - Density: 13.07/sq mi (5.05/km^{2})
- Time zone: UTC-6 (CST)
  - Summer (DST): UTC-5 (CDT)
- Zip Code: 72675 (St. Joe)
- Area code: 870

St. Joe Township is one of fifteen current townships in Searcy County, Arkansas, USA. As of the 2010 census, its total population was 390.

== Geography ==
According to the United States Census Bureau, St. Joe Township covers an area of 30.077 square miles (77.90 km^{2}); 29.838 square miles (77.28 km^{2}) of land and 0.239 square miles (0.62 km^{2}) of water.

=== Cities, towns, and villages ===
- St. Joe (part)
