= Red Leaf =

Red Leaf or Red Leaves may refer to:

- Red Leaf, Arkansas, a community in the United States
- Red leaf lettuce, a group of lettuce cultivars
- Red Leaf Records
- Red Leaf Resources
- Red Leaves, a short story by William Faulkner
- Red Leaves / 紅葉, an English/Japanese magazine
- Taitung Red Leaves, a former Taiwanese Little League team
