= Benjamin Henley =

Benjamin or Ben Henley may refer to:

- Ben C. Henley (1907–1987), American lawyer and businessman from Arkansas
- Benjamin Franklin Henley, for whom the Benjamin Franklin Henley House in Searcy County, Arkansas is named
