= Prairie Township, Indiana =

Prairie Township is the name of six townships in the U.S. state of Indiana:

- Prairie Township, Henry County, Indiana
- Prairie Township, Kosciusko County, Indiana
- Prairie Township, LaPorte County, Indiana
- Prairie Township, Tipton County, Indiana
- Prairie Township, Warren County, Indiana
- Prairie Township, White County, Indiana

== See also ==
- Prairie Township (disambiguation)
