= Rago =

Rago may refer to:

== Places ==
- Rago, Arkansas, United States
- Rago, Colorado, United States
- Rago, Kansas, United States
- Rago National Park, Norway

== People ==
- Antonio Rago (born 1990), Canadian soccer player
- Henry Rago (1915–1969), American poet
- Joseph Rago (1983–2017), Wall Street Journal writer
- Pablo Rago (born 1972), Argentine actor
