= Benjamin Franklin Henley House =

Historic house in Arkansas, United States

- U.S. National Register of Historic Places
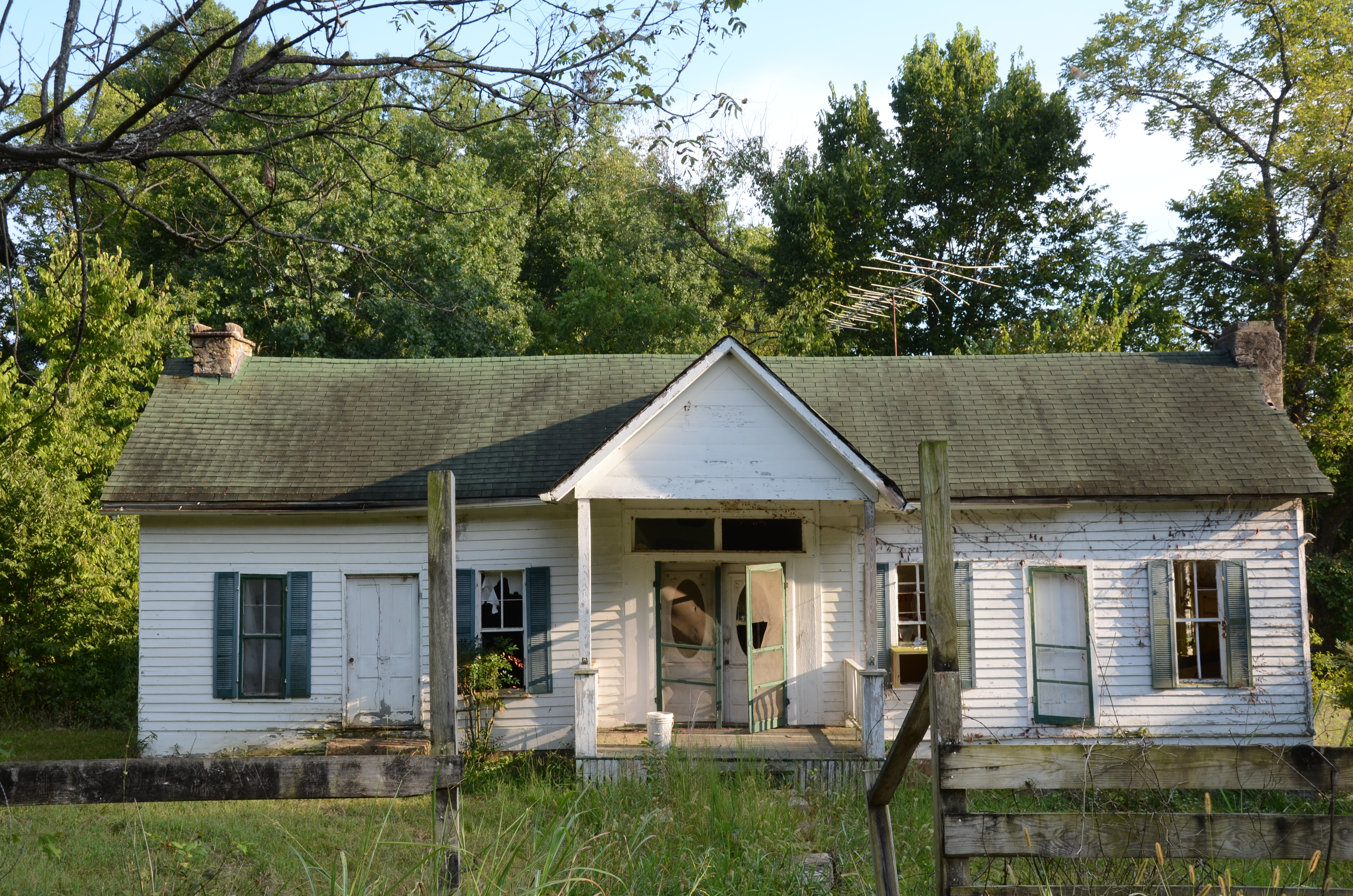
- Nearest city: St. Joe, Arkansas
- Area: 4 acres (1.6 ha)
- Built: 1870
- Architectural style: Greek Revival
- NRHP reference No.: 85003070
- Added to NRHP: December 5, 1985

The Benjamin Franklin Henley House is a historic house in rural Searcy County, Arkansas. It is located northeast of St. Joe, on the south side of a side road off Arkansas Highway 374. It is a single-story wood frame dogtrot house, with a projecting gable-roofed portico in front of the original breezeway area. The house was built in stages, the first being a braced-frame half structure in about 1870, and the second room, completing the dogtrot, in 1876.

The house was listed on the National Register of Historic Places in 1985.

== See also ==
- National Register of Historic Places listings in Searcy County, Arkansas
