= Mount Pleasant Township, Searcy County, Arkansas =

Mount Pleasant Township
- Township
- Location in Arkansas
- Coordinates: 35°47′22″N 92°50′34″W
- Country: United States
- State: Arkansas
- County: Searcy

Area
  - Total: 108.998 sq mi (282.30 km^{2})
  - Land: 108.750 sq mi (281.66 km^{2})
  - Water: 0.248 sq mi (0.64 km^{2})

Population (2010)
  - Total: 465
  - Density: 4.28/sq mi (1.65/km^{2})
- Time zone: UTC-6 (CST)
  - Summer (DST): UTC-5 (CDT)
- Area code: 870

Mount Pleasant Township is one of fifteen current townships in Searcy County, Arkansas, USA. As of the 2010 census, its total population was 465.

== Geography ==
According to the United States Census Bureau, Mount Pleasant Township covers an area of 108.998 square miles (282.30 km^{2}); 108.75 square miles (281.7 km^{2}) of land and 0.248 square miles (0.64 km^{2}) of water.
