= Gilbert, Arkansas =

- Town

- Location of Gilbert in Searcy County, Arkansas.
- Coordinates: 35°59′26″N 92°43′00″W
- Country: United States
- State: Arkansas
- County: Searcy

Area
  - Total: 0.39 sq mi (1.00 km^{2})
  - Land: 0.37 sq mi (0.95 km^{2})
  - Water: 0.019 sq mi (0.05 km^{2})
- Elevation: 630 ft (190 m)

Population (2020)
  - Total: 26
  - Estimate (2025): 25 ▼
  - Density: 70.9/sq mi (27.36/km^{2})
- Time zone: UTC-6 (Central (CST))
  - Summer (DST): UTC-5 (CDT)
- ZIP code: 72636
- Area code: 870
- FIPS code: 05-26800
- GNIS feature ID: 2406567
- Website: townofgilbertar.com

Gilbert is a town in Searcy County, Arkansas, United States. The population was 26 at the 2020 census, ranking it as the smallest municipality in the state and one of the smallest in the nation. Over the years, Gilbert has gained a reputation (along with Calico Rock) as one of the coldest locations in Arkansas.

== History ==
The Gilbert community was founded in 1902 when a railroad construction camp for the Missouri and North Arkansas (M&NA) Railroad was built and named in honor of Charles W. Gilbert, secretary-treasurer of Allegheny Supply Company, which was building the railroad. The M&NA began at Seligman, Missouri and rambled for 303 tortuous miles to Helena, Arkansas on the Mississippi River. In 1906, William Mays moved his store and post office to Gilbert. The Gilbert General Store, is listed on the National Register of Historic Places under the name Mays Store.

During the early 1920s, Reverend John Battenfield and his followers migrated into Gilbert and aspired to create a self-sufficient community to survive the return of the Messiah. They built a church and erected a sturdy building of smooth brown stones that was the print shop for their weekly newspaper, the Kingdom Harbinger. Gilbert Cemetery, for those who didn't make it for the anticipated Rapture, was founded in 1920 at the top of the hill on Frost Street. Gilbert School District Eighty-eight was formed in 1921. Eli Jordan donated the land for a school, the residents donated money for lumber and materials, anyone with a team and wagon hauled in the lumber, and the men of Gilbert built the school. As the town grew, it boasted four stores, two hotels, an Eagle Pencil Company mill, several sawmills and three doctors. 1923 passed without the appearance of the Messiah, and in 1925 Reverend Battenfield and his family left Gilbert to look for another location.

In the 1930s Gilbert had 116 people, its highest ever population count.

Gilbert remained a hub for commerce for several years. Cotton, logs, ore and grain came by rail. By the 1940s, unsustainable logging practices led to a decline in logging activity. The railroad suffered. The railroad tracks were soon removed and sold as scrap. Concrete pylons stand as evidence of the railroad.

In 2022 the community phased out its use of traditional street lights for light-emitting diode (LED) lights using high-pressure sodium. This is an anti-light pollution measure.

== Geography ==
According to the United States Census Bureau, the town has a total area of 0.8 km^{2} (0.31 sq mi).

=== Major highways ===
- Highway 333

== School District ==
Gilbert is in the Ozark Mountain School District, with a K-12 campus in nearby St. Joe.

== Demographics ==
Historical population
Census	Pop.	Note	%±
1930	116		—
1940	106		−8.6%
1950	51		−51.9%
1960	52		2.0%
1970	45		−13.5%
1980	43		−4.4%
1990	43		0.0%
2000	33		−23.3%
2010	28		−15.2%
2020	26		−7.1%
2025 (est.)	25	▼	−3.8%
U.S. Decennial Census; 2014 Estimate

As of the census of 2000, there were 33 people, 18 households and 10 families residing in the town. The population density was 41.1 people /km^{2} (106 people/mi^{2}). There were 29 housing units at an average density of 36.1 units /km^{2} (93 units/mi^{2}). The racial makeup of the town was 100.00% White.

There were 18 households, out of which 11.1% had children under the age of 18 living with them, 44.4% were married couples living together, 11.1% had a female householder with no husband present, and 44.4% were non-families. 33.3% of all households were made up of individuals, and 11.1% had someone living alone who was 65 years of age or older. The average household size was 1.83 and the average family size was 2.30.

In the town, the population was spread out, with 9.1% under the age of 18, 6.1% from 18 to 24, 18.2% from 25 to 44, 45.5% from 45 to 64 and 21.2% who were 65 years of age or older. The median age was 50 years. For every female resident, there were 1.063 males. For every female resident age 18 and over, there were 1.143 males.

The median income for a household in the town was $18,750, and the median income for a family was $20,625. Males had a median income of $28,750 versus $26,250 for females. The per capita income for the town was $15,729. There were no families and 17.1% of the population living below the poverty line, including none under the age of 18 and none of those over 64.

== Climate ==
The climate in this area is characterized by hot, humid summers and generally mild to cool winters. According to the Köppen Climate Classification system, Gilbert has a humid subtropical climate, abbreviated "Cfa" on climate maps.

Climate data for Gilbert, Arkansas (1991–2020 normals, extremes 1936–present)
Month	Jan	Feb	Mar	Apr	May	Jun	Jul	Aug	Sep	Oct	Nov	Dec	Year
Record high °F (°C)	82 (28)	88 (31)	92 (33)	94 (34)	95 (35)	108 (42)	114 (46)	113 (45)	109 (43)	97 (36)	87 (31)	83 (28)	114 (46)
Mean maximum °F (°C)	71.8 (22.1)	75.0 (23.9)	81.5 (27.5)	85.9 (29.9)	89.8 (32.1)	94.4 (34.7)	98.7 (37.1)	99.6 (37.6)	95.1 (35.1)	88.3 (31.3)	78.7 (25.9)	71.4 (21.9)	99.8 (37.7)
Mean daily maximum °F (°C)	48.2 (9.0)	52.7 (11.5)	61.3 (16.3)	70.4 (21.3)	77.2 (25.1)	85.0 (29.4)	89.5 (31.9)	89.5 (31.9)	82.7 (28.2)	72.6 (22.6)	60.1 (15.6)	50.6 (10.3)	70.0 (21.1)
Daily mean °F (°C)	36.3 (2.4)	40.2 (4.6)	48.6 (9.2)	57.7 (14.3)	66.1 (18.9)	74.3 (23.5)	78.3 (25.7)	77.5 (25.3)	70.0 (21.1)	58.9 (14.9)	47.3 (8.5)	39.0 (3.9)	57.8 (14.3)
Mean daily minimum °F (°C)	24.4 (−4.2)	27.6 (−2.4)	35.8 (2.1)	45.0 (7.2)	55.0 (12.8)	63.6 (17.6)	67.2 (19.6)	65.4 (18.6)	57.3 (14.1)	45.2 (7.3)	34.5 (1.4)	27.4 (−2.6)	45.7 (7.6)
Mean minimum °F (°C)	6.5 (−14.2)	10.0 (−12.2)	16.2 (−8.8)	26.8 (−2.9)	37.8 (3.2)	51.9 (11.1)	57.6 (14.2)	54.1 (12.3)	41.5 (5.3)	27.4 (−2.6)	17.4 (−8.1)	9.7 (−12.4)	2.1 (−16.6)
Record low °F (°C)	−20 (−29)	−23 (−31)	−2 (−19)	16 (−9)	27 (−3)	40 (4)	46 (8)	41 (5)	28 (−2)	15 (−9)	0 (−18)	−13 (−25)	−23 (−31)
Average precipitation inches (mm)	3.19 (81)	3.32 (84)	4.70 (119)	5.10 (130)	5.31 (135)	4.15 (105)	3.44 (87)	3.04 (77)	3.93 (100)	3.76 (96)	4.53 (115)	3.63 (92)	48.10 (1,222)
Average snowfall inches (cm)	1.6 (4.1)	0.6 (1.5)	1.3 (3.3)	0.0 (0.0)	0.0 (0.0)	0.0 (0.0)	0.0 (0.0)	0.0 (0.0)	0.0 (0.0)	0.0 (0.0)	0.0 (0.0)	0.9 (2.3)	4.4 (11)
Average precipitation days (≥ 0.01 in)	6.7	6.9	8.7	7.9	9.2	7.4	7.3	6.3	6.0	6.6	6.9	7.3	87.2
Average snowy days (≥ 0.1 in)	0.6	0.6	0.4	0.0	0.0	0.0	0.0	0.0	0.0	0.0	0.0	0.3	1.9
Source: NOAA

== Education ==
Gilbert is in the Ozark Mountain School District.

== Sister cities ==
- Bride parish, Isle of Man, United Kingdom
