= St. Joe High School =

Location
- 250 Hwy 65 South; St. Joe, Arkansas 72675; United States
- Coordinates: 36°01′45″N 92°48′00″W

Information
- School type: Public (government funded)
- Status: Open
- School district: Ozark Mountain School District (2004-2023); St. Joe School District (-2004)
- NCES District ID: 0500076
- Authority: Arkansas Department of Education (ADE)
- CEEB code: 042205
- NCES School ID: 050007601033
- Grades: 7–12
- Enrollment: 91 (2010–11)
- Student to teacher ratio: 6.81
- Education system: ADE Smart Core curriculum
- Colors: Blue and gold
- Athletics conference: 1A East (2012–14)
- Mascot: Wildcat
- Team name: St. Joe Wildcats
- Feeder schools: St. Joe Elementary School
- Affiliation: Arkansas Activities Association
- Website: stjoepublicschool.com

St. Joe High School was a comprehensive public high school serving students in grades seven through twelve in the remote, rural community of St. Joe, Arkansas, United States. It was the one of three high schools administered by the Ozark Mountain School District and the district's only high school in Searcy County, Arkansas.

== History ==
In February 2023, St. Joe High School had 48 students for both middle and high school levels. That year, it consolidated into Ozark Mountain High School, located on the former Western Grove High School site. The school district's board and the Arkansas Board of Education approved the consolidation.

== Academics ==
This Title I school is accredited by the Arkansas Department of Education (ADE). The assumed course of study follows the Smart Core curriculum developed the Arkansas Department of Education (ADE), which requires students to complete at least 22 credit units before graduation. Students engage in regular (core) and career focus courses and exams and may select Advanced Placement (AP) coursework and exams that may lead to college credit.

== Extracurricular activities ==
The St. Joe High School mascot and athletic emblem is the wildcat with school colors of blue and gold. The St. Joe Wildcats participate in various interscholastic activities in the 1A Classification—the state's smallest classification—within the 1A East Conference administered by the Arkansas Activities Association. As one of the smallest schools in the state, the school athletic activities are limited to basketball (boys/girls).
