= Castleberry–Harrington Historic District =

Historic district in Arkansas, United States

- U.S. National Register of Historic Places
- U.S. Historic district
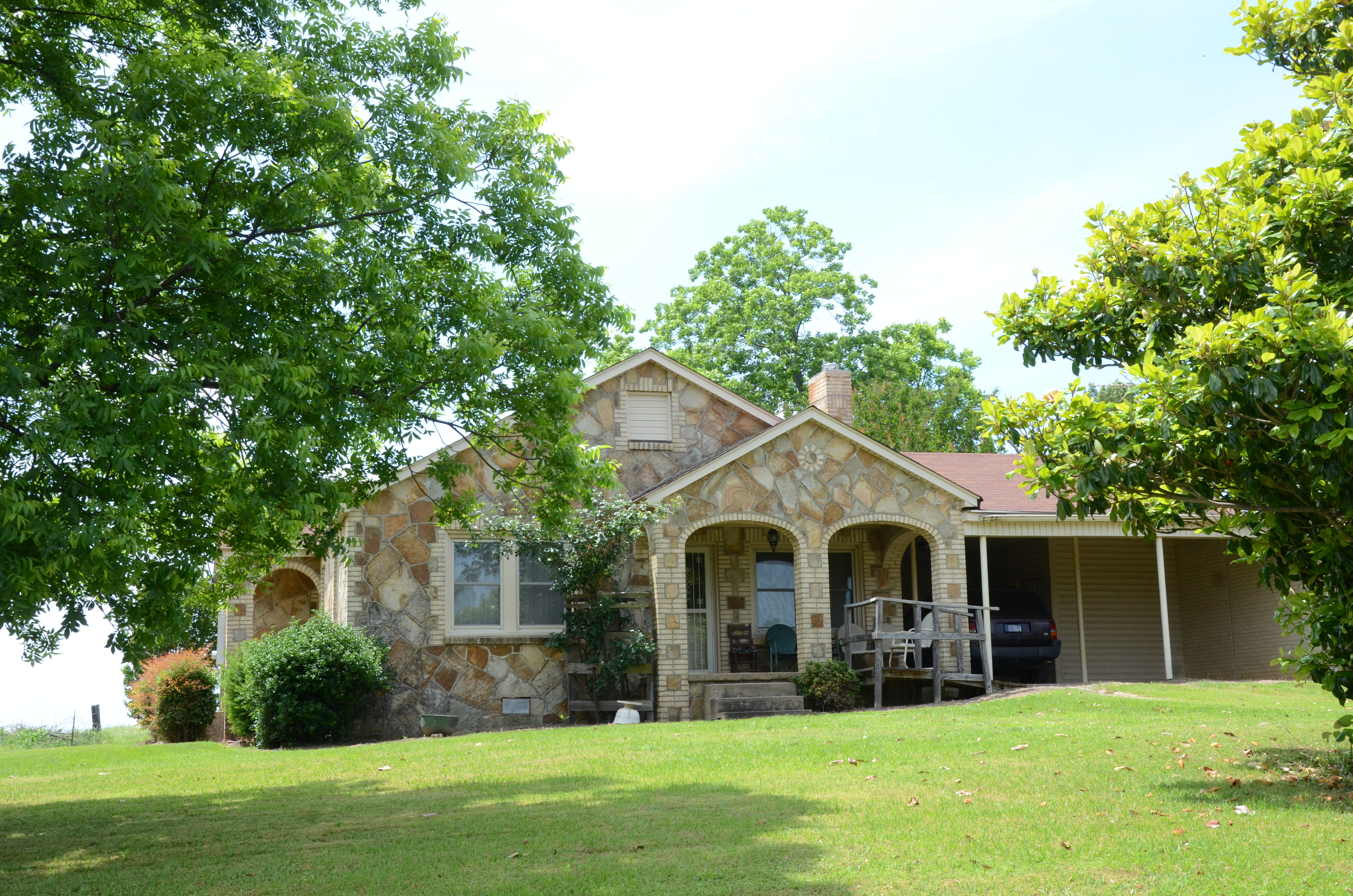

- Location within Arkansas Location within the United States
- Location: Castleberry Rd., Republican, Arkansas
- Coordinates: 35°15′36″N 92°25′36″W
- Area: 1.5 acres (0.61 ha)
- Built: 1946
- Built by: Silas Owens Sr.
- Architectural style: Mixed masonry
- MPS: Mixed Masonry Buildings of Silas Owens Sr. MPS
- NRHP reference No.: 07000503
- Added to NRHP: June 5, 2007

The Castleberry–Harrington Historic District encompasses a collection of three mixed masonry buildings erected between 1946 and 1950 by regionally known master mason Silas Owens Sr. on Castleberry Road in rural northwestern Faulkner County, Arkansas. All are single story stone structures, built of various shades of sandstone and other materials, and were built for various members of the extended Castleberry and Harrington families. One of them has an applied herringbone pattern of stonework for which Owens was particularly well known. The three houses are located on Castleberry Road, south of the hamlet of Republican.

The district was listed on the National Register of Historic Places in 2007.

== See also ==
- National Register of Historic Places listings in Faulkner County, Arkansas
