= Wileys Cove Township, Searcy County, Arkansas =

Wileys Cove Township
- Township
- Location in Arkansas
- Coordinates: 35°51′20″N 92°31′11″W
- Country: United States
- State: Arkansas
- County: Searcy

Area
  - Total: 45.435 sq mi (117.68 km^{2})
  - Land: 45.225 sq mi (117.13 km^{2})
  - Water: 0.210 sq mi (0.54 km^{2})

Population (2010)
  - Total: 777
  - Density: 17.18/sq mi (6.63/km^{2})
- Time zone: UTC-6 (CST)
  - Summer (DST): UTC-5 (CDT)
- Zip Code: 72645 (Leslie)
- Area code: 870

Wileys Cove Township is one of fifteen current townships in Searcy County, Arkansas, USA. As of the 2010 census, its total population was 777.

== Geography ==
According to the United States Census Bureau, Wileys Cove Township covers an area of 45.435 square miles (117.68 km^{2}); 45.225 square miles (117.13 km^{2}) of land and 0.210 square miles (0.54 km^{2}) of water.

=== Cities, towns, and villages ===
- Leslie
