= Reta =

Reta may refer to:

- Reta language, Papuan language
- Athyma reta (butterfly)
- Retatrutide, an experimental drug in development for obesity

== People ==
=== Given name ===
- Reta Beebe (born 1936), American astronomer, author and popularizer of astronomy
- Reta Cowley (1910–2004), Canadian painter
- Reta Jo Lewis (born 1953), American Director of Congressional Affairs, an attorney, diplomat
- Reta Mays (born 1975), American serial killer
- Reta Shaw (1912–1982), American character actress
- Reta Trotman (born 1989), New Zealand racing cyclist

=== Surname ===
- Adela Reta (1921-2001), Uruguayan lawyer and jurist
- Runa Reta (born 1980), Canadian squash player

== See also ==
- Retta (disambiguation)
