= Cozahome, Arkansas =

- Unincorporated community
- Location within Arkansas Location within the United States
- Coordinates: 36°02′42″N 92°30′06″W
- Country: United States
- State: Arkansas
- County: Searcy
- Elevation: 1,204 ft (367 m)
- Time zone: UTC-6 (Central (CST))
  - Summer (DST): UTC-5 (CDT)
- ZIP codes: 72627
- Area code: 870
- GNIS feature ID: 57596

Cozahome is an unincorporated community in Searcy County, Arkansas, United States. Cozahome is 12 miles (19 km) northeast of Marshall.
