= Spring Township, Searcy County, Arkansas =

Spring Township
- Township
- Location in Arkansas
- Coordinates: 35°54′17″N 92°42′38″W
- Country: United States
- State: Arkansas
- County: Searcy

Area
  - Total: 46.942 sq mi (121.58 km^{2})
  - Land: 46.715 sq mi (120.99 km^{2})
  - Water: 0.227 sq mi (0.59 km^{2})

Population (2010)
  - Total: 588
  - Density: 12.59/sq mi (4.86/km^{2})
- Time zone: UTC-6 (CST)
  - Summer (DST): UTC-5 (CDT)
- Zip Code: 72650 (Marshall)
- Area code: 870

Spring Township is one of fifteen current townships in Searcy County, Arkansas, USA. As of the 2010 census, its total population was 588.

== Geography ==
According to the United States Census Bureau, Spring Township covers an area of 46.942 square miles (121.58 km^{2}); 46.715 square miles (120.99 km^{2}) of land and 0.227 square miles (0.59 km^{2}) of water.

=== Cities, towns, and villages ===
- Marshall (part)
