= Shady Grove Township, Searcy County, Arkansas =

Shady Grove Township
- Township
- Location in Arkansas
- Coordinates: 35°44′37″N 92°39′19″W
- Country: United States
- State: Arkansas
- County: Searcy

Area
  - Total: 43.805 sq mi (113.45 km^{2})
  - Land: 42.834 sq mi (110.94 km^{2})
  - Water: 0.971 sq mi (2.51 km^{2})

Population (2010)
  - Total: 189
  - Density: 4.41/sq mi (1.70/km^{2})
- Time zone: UTC-6 (CST)
  - Summer (DST): UTC-5 (CDT)
- Zip Code: 72645 (Leslie)
- Area code: 870

Shady Grove Township is one of fifteen current townships in Searcy County, Arkansas, USA. As of the 2010 census, its total population was 189.

== Geography ==
According to the United States Census Bureau, Shady Grove Township covers an area of 43.805 square miles (113.45 km^{2}); 42.834 square miles (110.94 km^{2}) of land and 0.971 square miles (2.51 km^{2}) of water.
