= Basco, Illinois =

- Village
- Location of Basco in Hancock County, Illinois.
- Coordinates: 40°19′40″N 91°11′58″W
- Country: United States
- State: Illinois
- County: Hancock
- Township: Bear Creek
- Established: August 20, 1886

Area
  - Total: 0.22 sq mi (0.58 km^{2})
  - Land: 0.22 sq mi (0.58 km^{2})
  - Water: 0 sq mi (0.00 km^{2})
- Elevation: 633 ft (193 m)

Population (2020)
  - Total: 80
  - Density: 359.9/sq mi (138.97/km^{2})
- Time zone: UTC-6 (CST)
  - Summer (DST): UTC-5 (CDT)
- ZIP code: 62313
- Area code: 217
- FIPS code: 17-04052
- GNIS feature ID: 2398046

Basco is a village in Bear Creek Township, Hancock County, Illinois, United States. The population was 80 at the 2020 census.

== Geography ==
Basco is located in south-central Hancock County southwest of Carthage, the county seat.

According to the 2021 census gazetteer files, Basco has a total area of 0.22 square miles (0.57 km^{2}), all land.

== Demographics ==
Historical population
Census	Pop.	Note	%±
1890	327		—
1900	318		−2.8%
1910	255		−19.8%
1920	267		4.7%
1930	206		−22.8%
1940	238		15.5%
1950	220		−7.6%
1960	191		−13.2%
1970	193		1.0%
1980	155		−19.7%
1990	99		−36.1%
2000	107		8.1%
2010	98		−8.4%
2020	80		−18.4%
U.S. Decennial Census

As of the 2020 census there were 80 people, 45 households, and 24 families residing in the village. The population density was 360.36 inhabitants per square mile (139.14/km^{2}). There were 49 housing units at an average density of 220.72 per square mile (85.22/km^{2}). The racial makeup of the village was 93.75% White, 0.00% African American, 0.00% Native American, 0.00% Asian, 0.00% Pacific Islander, 0.00% from other races, and 6.25% from two or more races. Hispanic or Latino of any race were 1.25% of the population.

There were 45 households, out of which 13.3% had children under the age of 18 living with them, 37.78% were married couples living together, 11.11% had a female householder with no husband present, and 46.67% were non-families. 42.22% of all households were made up of individuals, and 6.67% had someone living alone who was 65 years of age or older. The average household size was 2.46 and the average family size was 1.89.

The village's age distribution consisted of 15.3% under the age of 18, 0.0% from 18 to 24, 15.4% from 25 to 44, 55.3% from 45 to 64, and 14.1% who were 65 years of age or older. The median age was 54.1 years. For every 100 females, there were 112.5 males. For every 100 females age 18 and over, there were 125.0 males.

The median income for a household in the village was $40,313, and the median income for a family was $52,917. Males had a median income of $45,000 versus $35,250 for females. The per capita income for the village was $26,560. About 12.5% of families and 16.5% of the population were below the poverty line, including 53.8% of those under age 18 and 0.0% of those age 65 or over.
