= Arkansas Highway 333 =

Highway in Arkansas

Highway 333
- AR 333 highlighted in red

Route information
- Maintained by ArDOT
- Existed: 1965–present

Section 1
- Length: 17.20 mi (27.68 km)
- South end: US 64 in London
- North end: AR 7

Section 2
- Length: 2.63 mi (4.23 km)
- South end: CR 8
- North end: US 65 near Marshall

Section 3
- Length: 3.37 mi (5.42 km)
- South end: Frost Street in Gilbert
- North end: US 65

Location
- Country: United States
- State: Arkansas
- Counties: Pope, Searcy

Highway system
- Arkansas Highway System; Interstate; US; State; Business; Spurs; Suffixed; Scenic; Heritage
← AR 332	→ AR 334

Highway 333 (AR 333, Ark. 333, and Hwy. 333) is a designation of three north–south state highways in Arkansas. One route begins at US Highway 64 (US 64) and runs north 17.20 miles (27.68 km) to Highway 7. A second highway begins at Searcy County Road 8 (CR 8) and runs north to US 65 near Marshall. A third segment connects Gilbert to the state highway system. All three highways were created and modified to their existing alignments between 1965 and 1974, and are maintained by the Arkansas Department of Transportation (ArDOT).

== Route description ==
No segment of Highway 333 has been listed as part of the National Highway System, a network of roads important to the nation's economy, defense, and mobility.

The ArDOT maintains Highway 333 like all other parts of the state highway system. As a part of these responsibilities, it tracks the volume of traffic using its roads in surveys using a metric called average annual daily traffic (AADT). ArDOT estimates the traffic level for a segment of roadway for any average day of the year in these surveys.

=== London to Dover ===
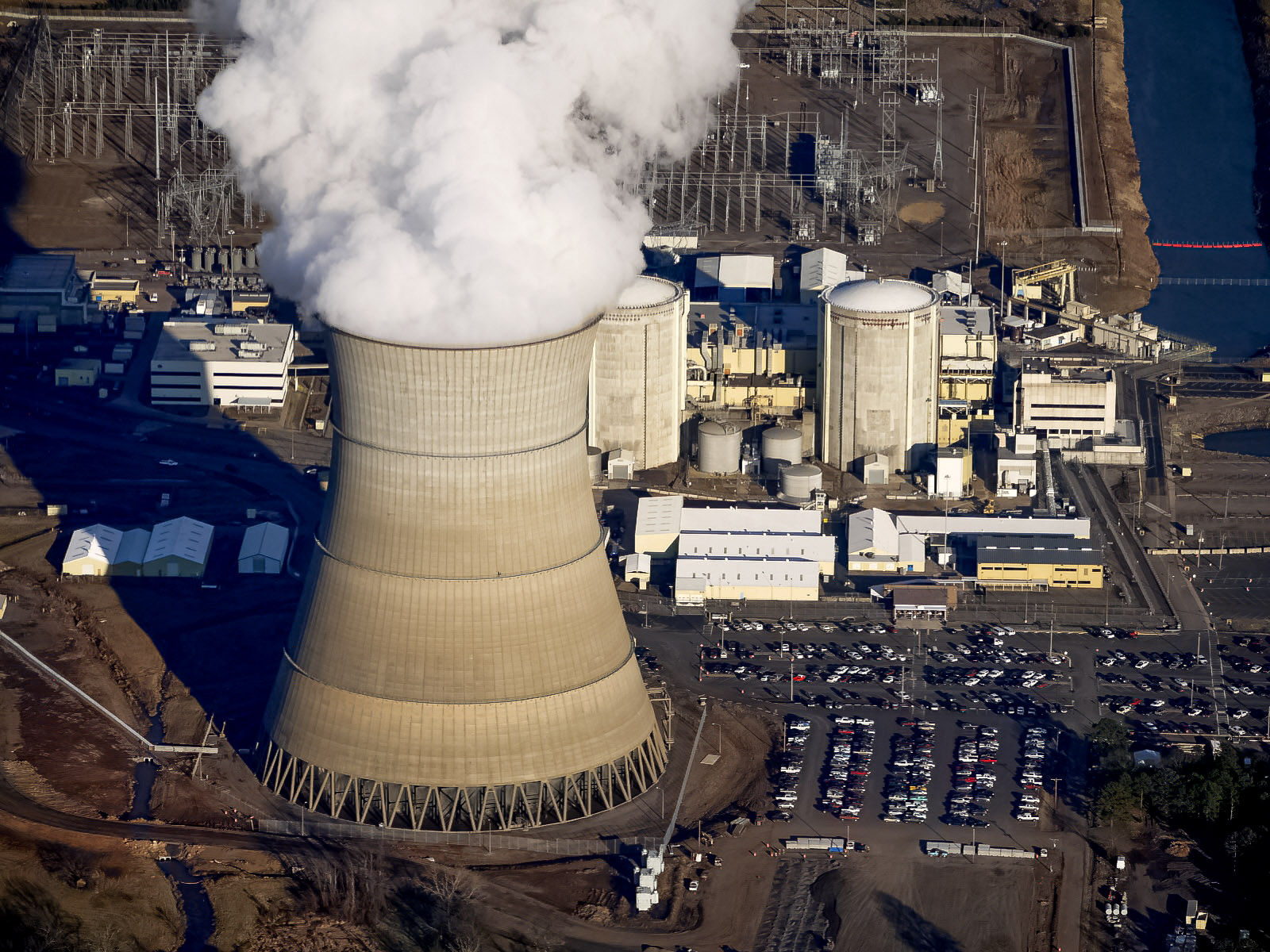
Highway 333 serves as the primary state highway access to Arkansas Nuclear One power plant

The second section is a state highway of 17.2 miles (27.7 km) in Pope County in the Arkansas River Valley. The route begins at US 64 at Mill Creek. AR 333 runs west to London before turning north and crossing US 64 and Interstate 40 (I-40). The route runs north and east after I-40, terminating at AR 7 near Dover.

Arkansas Nuclear One

=== Canaan to Marshall ===
The first section is a state highway of 18.9 miles (30.4 km) in Searcy County. The route begins at Searcy County Road 8 (CR 8) and runs north to meet AR 27. Near the Searcy County Airport, AR 333 breaks from AR 27 and runs north. The route then meets U.S. Highway 65 (US 65) and AR 74.

=== Gilbert ===
A third segment of Highway 333 begins at Frost Street in Gilbert, a small town on the Buffalo National River in Searcy County. It runs north and east to US 65, where it terminates.

As of 2016, the route had an annual average daily traffic (AADT) of 190 vehicles per day (VPD). This AADT classifies Highway 333 as a very low volume local road by American Association of State Highway and Transportation Officials (AASHTO), meaning fewer than 400 vehicles per day.

== History ==
The road existed as a gravel road as early as 1958. By 1964, the gravel road became two disconnected state highway segments, both with the AR 333 designation. By 1983, the two AR 333 segments were connected, and the area east of London was also added. It became a bituminous surface road. The route was paved by 1992.

== Major intersections ==
Mile markers reset at concurrencies.

County	Location	mi	km	Destinations	Notes
Pope	London	0.00	0.00	US 64 to I-40 – Russellville, London	Southern terminus
Pope	London	3.80	6.12	US 64 – Russellville, Clarksville	
Pope	London	4.21	6.78	I-40 – Little Rock, Fort Smith	
Pope		17.20	27.68	AR 7 (Scenic 7 Byway) – Russellville, Jasper	Northern terminus
Pope	Gap in route				
Searcy		0.00	0.00	CR 8	Southern terminus
Searcy	Canaan	0.62– 0.00	1.00– 0.00	AR 27 – Witts Spring, Marshall, Tilly	
Searcy	Marshall	2.01	3.23	US 65 – Marshall, Harrison	Northern terminus
Searcy	Gap in route				
Searcy	Gilbert	0.00	0.00	Frost Street	Southern terminus
Searcy		3.37	5.42	US 65 – Harrison, Marshall	Northern terminus
1.000 mi = 1.609 km; 1.000 km = 0.621 mi: Concurrency terminus
