= Farris and Evelyn Langley House =

Historic house in Arkansas, United States

- U.S. National Register of Historic Places
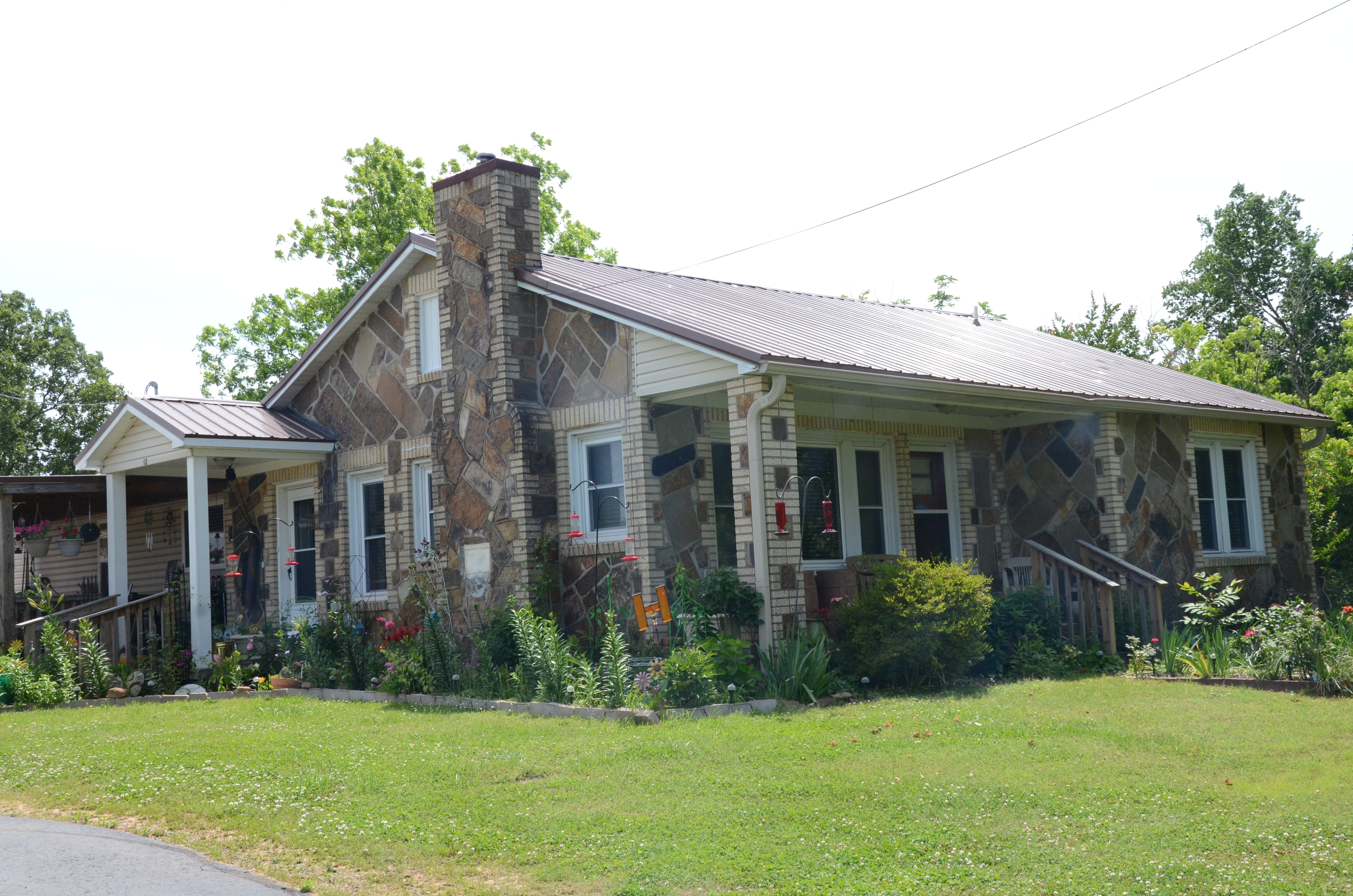

- Location within Arkansas Location within the United States
- Location: 12 Langley Ln., Republican, Arkansas
- Coordinates: 35°17′17″N 92°23′53″W
- Area: less than one acre
- Built: 1955
- Built by: Silas Owens Sr. (mason); Albert Palmer (carpenter)
- Architectural style: Modern Movement, Mixed Masonry
- MPS: Mixed Masonry Buildings of Silas Owens, Sr. MPS
- NRHP reference No.: 05000493
- Added to NRHP: June 1, 2005

The Farris and Evelyn Langley House is a historic house at 12 Langley Lane in Republican, Arkansas. It is a rectangular frame house, its exterior finished in stone veneer with cream-colored brick trim. A gabled roof covers the house, extending over a recessed entry porch, its corner supported by a brick post. The ranch-style house was built in 1956 by Silas Owens, Sr., a mason noted regionally for his distinctive style. Hallmarks of his style are evident in this house, including the cream brick, and angled placement of the stones on the building's larger surfaces.

The house was listed on the National Register of Historic Places in 2995.

== See also ==
- National Register of Historic Places listings in Faulkner County, Arkansas
