= Ratio, Arkansas =

Unincorporated community in Arkansas, US

Coordinates: 34°15′40″N 90°55′55″W

Ratio is an unincorporated community in Phillips County, Arkansas, United States.

The etymology of the name "Ratio" is obscure.
