= Rock Creek Township, Searcy County, Arkansas =

Rock Creek Township
- Township
- Location in Arkansas
- Coordinates: 36°1′19″N 92°29′48″W
- Country: United States
- State: Arkansas
- County: Searcy

Area
  - Total: 53.012 sq mi (137.30 km^{2})
  - Land: 52.915 sq mi (137.05 km^{2})
  - Water: 0.097 sq mi (0.25 km^{2})

Population (2010)
  - Total: 547
  - Density: 10.48/sq mi (4.05/km^{2})
- Time zone: UTC-6 (CST)
  - Summer (DST): UTC-5 (CDT)
- Area code: 870

Rock Creek Township is one of fifteen current townships in Searcy County, Arkansas, USA. As of the 2010 census, its total population was 547.

== Geography ==
According to the United States Census Bureau, Rock Creek Township covers an area of 53.012 square miles (137.30 km^{2}); 52.915 square miles (137.05 km^{2}) of land and 0.097 square miles (0.25 km^{2}) of water.
