= Piney, Pope County, Arkansas =

Piney, Arkansas
- Unincorporated community
- Piney's position in Arkansas. Piney, Arkansas (the United States)
- Coordinates: 35°26′26″N 93°11′25″W
- Country: United States
- State: Arkansas
- County: Pope
- Elevation: 541 ft (165 m)
- Time zone: UTC-6 (Central (CST))
  - Summer (DST): UTC-5 (CDT)
- GNIS feature ID: 78016

Piney is an unincorporated community in Martin Township, Pope County, Arkansas, United States.
