= Paraloma, Arkansas =

- Unincorporated community
- Paraloma's position in Arkansas Paraloma, Arkansas (the United States)
- Coordinates: 33°47′52″N 94°01′09″W
- Country: United States
- State: Arkansas
- County: Sevier
- Township: Washington
- Elevation: 1,129 ft (344 m)
- Time zone: UTC-6 (Central (CST))
  - Summer (DST): UTC-5 (CDT)
- ZIP code: 71846
- Area code: 870
- GNIS feature ID: 58324

Paraloma is an unincorporated community in Washington Township, Sevier County, Arkansas, United States. It is located on Highway 234 north of Millwood Lake.
