= Red River Township, Searcy County, Arkansas =

Red River Township
- Township
- Location in Arkansas
- Coordinates: 35°48′55″N 92°41′14″W
- Country: United States
- State: Arkansas
- County: Searcy

Area
  - Total: 33.208 sq mi (86.01 km^{2})
  - Land: 33.144 sq mi (85.84 km^{2})
  - Water: 0.064 sq mi (0.17 km^{2})

Population (2010)
  - Total: 321
  - Density: 9.69/sq mi (3.74/km^{2})
- Time zone: UTC-6 (CST)
  - Summer (DST): UTC-5 (CDT)
- Zip Code: 72645 (Leslie)
- Area code: 870

Red River Township is one of fifteen current townships in Searcy County, Arkansas, USA. As of the 2010 census, its total population was 321.

== Geography ==
According to the United States Census Bureau, Red River Township covers an area of 33.208 square miles (86.01 km^{2}); 33.144 square miles (85.84 km^{2}) of land and 0.064 square miles (0.17 km^{2}) of water.
