= Pindall, Arkansas =

- Town
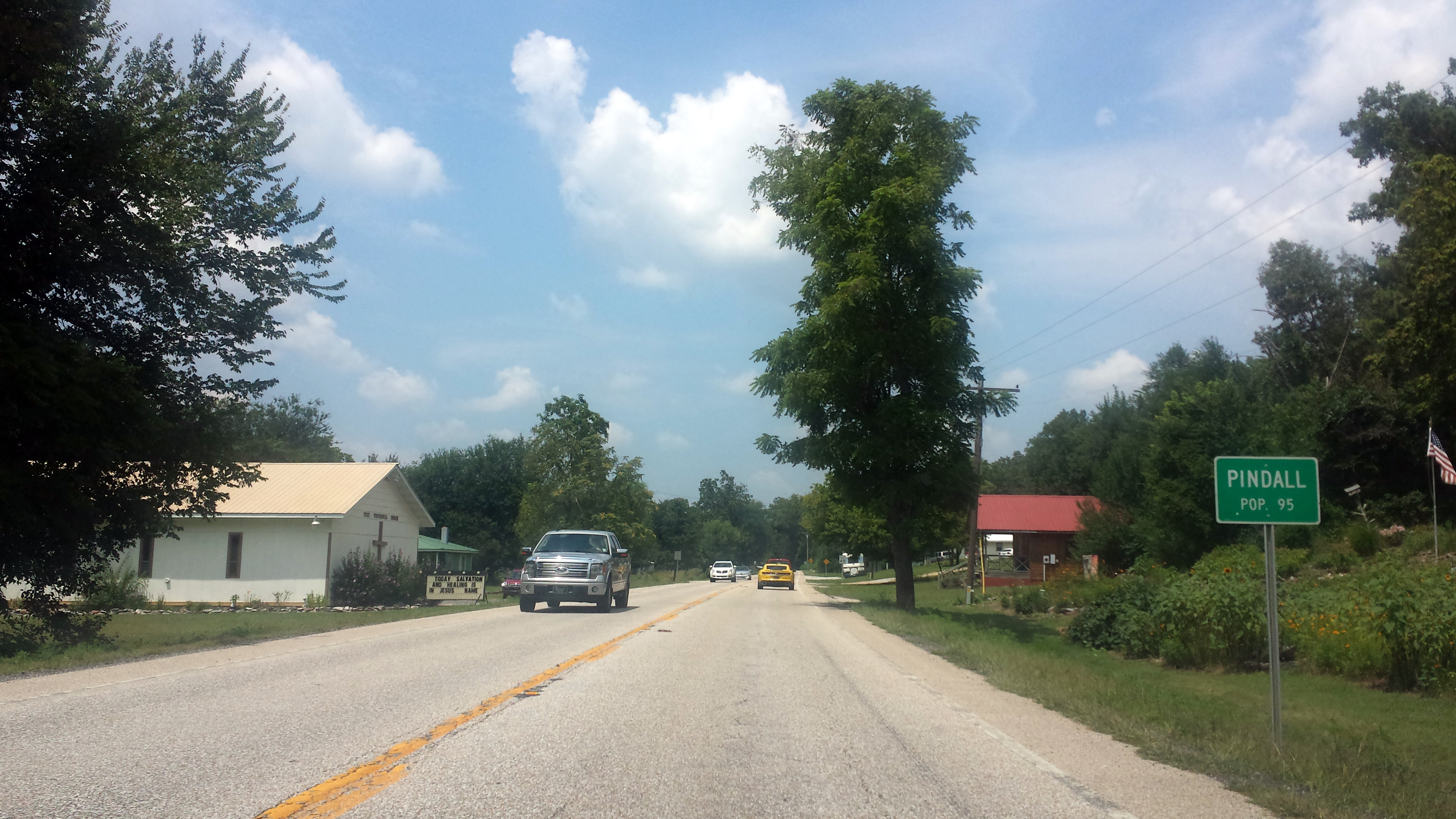
- Entrance to Pindall

- Location of Pindall in Searcy County, Arkansas.
- Coordinates: 36°03′49″N 92°51′44″W
- Country: United States
- State: Arkansas
- County: Searcy

Area
  - Total: 2.87 sq mi (7.44 km^{2})
  - Land: 2.87 sq mi (7.44 km^{2})
  - Water: 0 sq mi (0.00 km^{2})
- Elevation: 1,194 ft (364 m)

Population (2020)
  - Total: 95
  - Estimate (2025): 100 ▲
  - Density: 33.1/sq mi (12.78/km^{2})
- Time zone: UTC-6 (Central (CST))
  - Summer (DST): UTC-5 (CDT)
- ZIP code: 72669
- Area code: 870
- FIPS code: 05-55280
- GNIS feature ID: 2407113

Pindall is a town in Searcy County, Arkansas, United States. As of the 2020 census, Pindall had a population of 95. The town is said to be named for Governor Xenophon Overton Pindall.

== Geography ==
According to the United States Census Bureau, the town has a total area of 2.9 square miles (7.5 km^{2}), all land.

=== Major highway ===
- U.S. Highway 65

== School District ==
Pindall is in the Ozark Mountain School District, with a K-12 campus in nearby St. Joe.

== Demographics ==
Historical population
Census	Pop.	Note	%±
1990	135		—
2000	95		−29.6%
2010	112		17.9%
2020	95		−15.2%
2025 (est.)	100	▲	5.3%
U.S. Decennial Census

At the 2000 census there were 95 people, 36 households, and 30 families in the town. The population density was 33.1 inhabitants per square mile (12.8/km^{2}). There were 54 housing units at an average density of 18.8 per square mile (7.3/km^{2}). The racial makeup of the town was 97.89% White and 2.11% Native American. Of the 36 households 41.7% had children under the age of 18 living with them, 69.4% were married couples living together, 8.3% had a female householder with no husband present, and 13.9% were non-families. 13.9% of households were one person and 8.3% were one person aged 65 or older. The average household size was 2.64 and the average family size was 2.87.

The age distribution was 25.3% under the age of 18, 5.3% from 18 to 24, 32.6% from 25 to 44, 20.0% from 45 to 64, and 16.8% 65 or older. The median age was 38 years. For every 100 females, there were 106.5 males. For every 100 females age 18 and over, there were 102.9 males.

The median household income was $32,500 and the median family income was $32,750. Males had a median income of $28,750 versus $18,750 for females. The per capita income for the town was $12,550. There were 16.0% of families and 21.6% of the population living below the poverty line, including 38.9% of under eighteens and 22.2% of those over 64.
