= Retta Nagala =

- village
- Location in Uttar Pradesh, India Retta Nagala (India)
- Coordinates: 29.5996368°N 77.7756929°E
- Country: India
- State: Uttar Pradesh
- District: Muzaffarnagar

Government
  - Body: Gram panchayat

Population (2009)
  - Total: 6 to 7 thousand

Languages
  - Official: Hindi
- Time zone: UTC+5:30 (IST)
- PIN: 251307
- Vehicle registration: UP
- Nearest city: Muzaffarnagar
- Sex ratio: 1000/950 ♂/♀
- Literacy: 90%
- Lok Sabha constituency: Bijnor
- Vidhan Sabha constituency: Charthwal Vidhan Sabha
- Website: up.gov.in

Retta Nagala (also known as Retanagla, Retanangala, Reta Nagla) is a village in Muzaffarnagar district in the Indian state of Uttar Pradesh. It is situated on the Roorkee Road (NH-58), and has a population of between 5,000 and 6,000.
