= Round Mountain, Arkansas =

- Unincorporated community
- Location within Arkansas Location within the United States
- Coordinates: 35°01′31″N 92°26′51″W
- Country: United States
- State: Arkansas
- County: Faulkner
- Elevation: 308 ft (94 m)
- Time zone: UTC-6 (Central (CST))
  - Summer (DST): UTC-5 (CDT)
- Area code: 501
- GNIS feature ID: 76128

Round Mountain is an unincorporated community in Faulkner County, Arkansas, United States. Round Mountain is located on the southern border of Conway.
