= Bear Creek Township, Montgomery County, Missouri =

Township in Montgomery County, Missouri, U.S.

Coordinates: 38.9344°N 91.3378°W

Bear Creek Township is an inactive township in Montgomery County, in the U.S. state of Missouri.

Bear Creek Township was established in 1818, taking its name from Bear Creek.
