= Point Peter, Arkansas =

- Unincorporated community
- Location within Arkansas Location within the United States
- Coordinates: 35°57′20″N 92°54′34″W
- Country: United States
- State: Arkansas
- County: Searcy
- Elevation: 712 ft (217 m)
- Time zone: UTC-6 (Central (CST))
  - Summer (DST): UTC-5 (CDT)
- GNIS feature ID: 73146

Point Peter is an unincorporated community in Searcy County, Arkansas, United States.

A post office was established at Point Peter in the 1840s.
