= Pecan Point, Arkansas =

- Unincorporated community
- Location within Arkansas Location within the United States
- Coordinates: 35°28′39″N 90°02′21″W
- Country: United States
- State: Arkansas
- County: Mississippi
- Elevation: 236 ft (72 m)
- Time zone: UTC-6 (Central (CST))
  - Summer (DST): UTC-5 (CDT)
- Area code: 870
- GNIS feature ID: 58340

Pecan Point is an unincorporated community in Mississippi County, Arkansas, United States. Pecan Point is located on Arkansas Highway 118, 6.4 miles (10.3 km) east-southeast of Joiner.

In the late 1880s, local planter G.W. Pratt built and operated a tramway in the area for the purposes of harvesting timber. By 1890, the tramway's line was two miles long and used 14 men to operate it.
