= Rally Hill, Arkansas =

Coordinates: 36°09′39″N 92°57′10″W

Rally Hill is an unincorporated community in Boone County, Arkansas, United States.

State senator Ripley B. Weaver lived in Rally Hill.

It was home to Rally Springs Academy in the late 19th century.

Prairie Home Seminary was in Rally Hill.

In 1895 the Arkansas legislature passed a bill prohibiting the sale or giving away of "ancient spirits" within three miles of Rally Hill Academy, and the governor signed it. The bill was introduced by Senator Weaver. Senator Hudgins of Boone County moved the bill forward for its third reading, and the spirits were referred to as ardent. A vote was recorded on the bill.

During the Civil War the Skirmish at Rolling Prairie took place near the Rolling Hills Church. It is commemorated by a historical marker.

There are a Rally Hill Church and Rally Hill Road.

J. W. Blankenship edited the Rally Hill Journal of Education, a "school paper".

An 1890 history of Arkansas includes a map showing its location in southeast Boone County. Rally Hill is on an 1891 geologic map of the area around Yellville, Arkansas.

J. H. Jones served as postmaster in 1872. In 1894 the Geological Survey documented the height of its post office.

The North Arkansas Railroad passed by near it.

The Boone County Heritage Museum has a photo of Rally Hill Academy.
