= Republican, Arkansas =

- Unincorporated community
- Location within Arkansas Location within the United States
- Coordinates: 35°16′53″N 92°25′31″W
- Country: United States
- State: Arkansas
- County: Faulkner
- Elevation: 367 ft (112 m)
- Time zone: UTC-6 (Central (CST))
  - Summer (DST): UTC-5 (CDT)
- Area code: 501
- GNIS feature ID: 78166

Republican is an unincorporated community in Faulkner County, Arkansas, United States. The community is located along local roads in the northeast part of the county, 3.9 miles (6.3 km) northwest of Greenbrier.

The Castleberry-Harrington Historic District and the Farris and Evelyn Langley House, which are listed on the National Register of Historic Places, are both near the community.
