= Pleasant Hill, Garland County, Arkansas =

- Unincorporated community
- Location within Arkansas Location within the United States
- Coordinates: 34°27′20″N 93°09′42″W
- Country: United States
- State: Arkansas
- County: Garland
- Elevation: 528 ft (161 m)
- Time zone: UTC-6 (Central (CST))
  - Summer (DST): UTC-5 (CDT)
- Area code: 501
- GNIS feature ID: 73123

Pleasant Hill is an unincorporated community in Garland County, Arkansas, United States. Pleasant Hill is located on U.S. Route 70, 7 miles (11 km) west-southwest of Hot Springs.
