= Point Peter Creek =

Tributary of St. Mary's River

Coordinates: 30°43′37.85″N 81°30′29.34″W

Point Peter Creek is a stream in the U.S. state of Georgia. It is a tributary to the St. Marys River.

According to tradition, the name "Point Peter" may be a transfer from Queens County, Nova Scotia.
