= Pankey, Arkansas =

- Neighborhood
- Location of Pankey in Arkansas
- Coordinates: 34°48′01″N 92°25′14″W
- Country: United States
- State: Arkansas
- County: Pulaski
- City: Little Rock
- Elevation: 367 ft (112 m)
- Time zone: UTC-6 (Central (CST))
  - Summer (DST): UTC-5 (CDT)
- GNIS feature ID: 58320

Pankey is a formerly unincorporated community in Pulaski County, Arkansas, United States on Arkansas Highway 10. Historically, it was located west of Little Rock, but has since been annexed by the city.
