= Rhea's Mill Township, Washington County, Arkansas =

Township of Rhea's Mill
- Township
- Location of Washington County in Arkansas
- Coordinates: 36°01′5″N 94°23′21″W
- Country: United States
- State: Arkansas
- County: Washington
- Established: 1880-90

Area
  - Total: 16.4 sq mi (42 km^{2})
  - Land: 16.2 sq mi (42 km^{2})
  - Water: 0.2 sq mi (0.52 km^{2})
- Elevation: 1,175 ft (358 m)

Population (2000)
  - Total: 480
  - Density: 30/sq mi (12/km^{2})
- Time zone: UTC-6 (CST)
  - Summer (DST): UTC-5 (CDT)
- Area code: 479
- GNIS feature ID: 69801

Rhea's Mill Township (pronounced rays /reɪz/) is one of thirty-seven townships in Washington County, Arkansas, USA. As of the 2000 census, its total population was 480.

== Geography ==
According to the United States Census Bureau, Rhea's Mill Township covers an area of 16.4 square miles (42 km^{2}), with 16.2 square miles (42 km^{2}) of land and 0.2 square miles (0.52 km^{2}) of water.

=== Cities, towns, villages ===
- Rhea

=== Cemeteries ===
The township contains Crawford Cemetery.

=== Major routes ===
The township contains no state highways.
