= Rhea, Arkansas =

- Unincorporated community
- Rhea's position in Arkansas Rhea, Arkansas (the United States)
- Coordinates: 36°00′51.3″N 94°24′10.8″W
- Country: United States
- State: Arkansas
- County: Washington
- Township: Rhea's Mill
- Elevation: 1,129 ft (344 m)
- Time zone: UTC-6 (Central (CST))
  - Summer (DST): UTC-5 (CDT)
- ZIP code: 72744
- Area code: 479
- GNIS feature ID: 81890

Rhea (formerly Rhea Mill and Rhea's Mill; pronounced ray /reɪ/) is an unincorporated community in Rhea's Mill Township, Washington County, Arkansas, United States. It is located on a county road north of Lincoln and Lincoln Lake. Weddington Mountain is just to the west.

== History ==
Variant names were "Rhea Mills" and "Rheas Mills". A post office called Rheas Mills was established in 1867; the name was changed to Rhea Mills in 1893, again to Rhea in 1894, and the post office closed in 1963. The community has the name of William H. Rhea, an early postmaster.
