= Rago, Arkansas =

- Unincorporated community
- Location within Arkansas Location within the United States
- Coordinates: 36°27′02″N 94°11′46″W
- Country: United States
- State: Arkansas
- County: Benton
- Elevation: 1,250 ft (380 m)
- Time zone: UTC-6 (Central (CST))
  - Summer (DST): UTC-5 (CDT)
- Area code: 479
- GNIS feature ID: 78129

Rago (also Rato) is an unincorporated community in Benton County, Arkansas, United States.
