= Bear Creek Township, Sevier County, Arkansas =

Bear Creek Township
- Township
- Location in Arkansas Bear Creek Township (the United States)
- Coordinates: 34°03′11″N 94°17′36″W
- Country: United States
- State: Arkansas
- County: Sevier

Area
  - Total: 61.208 sq mi (158.53 km^{2})
  - Land: 60.880 sq mi (157.68 km^{2})
  - Water: 0.328 sq mi (0.85 km^{2})
- Elevation: 479 ft (146 m)

Population (2010)
  - Total: 8,262
  - Density: 135.7/sq mi (52.40/km^{2})
- Time zone: UTC-6 (CST)
  - Summer (DST): UTC-5 (CDT)
- FIPS code: 05-90175
- GNIS ID: 69122

Bear Creek Township is a township in Sevier County, Arkansas, United States. Its total population was 8,262 as of the 2010 United States census, an increase of 10.04 percent from 7,508 at the 2000 census.

According to the 2010 Census, Bear Creek Township is located at 34°03′11″N 94°17′36″W (34.053050, -94.293319). It has a total area of 61.208 square miles (158.53 square kilometers), of which 60.880 sq mi (157.68 km^{2}) is land and 0.328 sq mi (0.85 km^{2}) is water (0.54%). As per the USGS National Elevation Dataset, the elevation is 479 feet (146 m).

Most of the city of De Queen is located within the township.
