= Bear Creek Township, Hancock County, Illinois =

Bear Creek Township
- Township
- Combined township and village building in Basco

- Location in Hancock County

- Hancock County's location in Illinois
- Coordinates: 40°19′43″N 91°11′55″W
- Country: United States
- State: Illinois
- County: Hancock
- Established: November 6, 1849

Area
  - Total: 36.32 sq mi (94.1 km^{2})
  - Land: 36.26 sq mi (93.9 km^{2})
  - Water: 0.06 sq mi (0.16 km^{2}) 0.17%
- Elevation: 640 ft (195 m)

Population (2020)
  - Total: 340
  - Density: 9.4/sq mi (3.6/km^{2})
- Time zone: UTC-6 (CST)
  - Summer (DST): UTC-5 (CDT)
- ZIP codes: 62313, 62321, 62341, 62379, 62380
- FIPS code: 17-067-04338

Bear Creek Township is one of twenty-four townships in Hancock County, Illinois, USA. As of the 2020 census, its population was 340 and it contained 153 housing units.

== History ==
Bear Creek Township was one of the original 19 townships of Hancock County, drawn to correspond to Town 4 North Range 7 West of the fourth principal meridian. It took its name from its principal stream, Bear Creek.

In the 1860s and 1870s, the grapes grown in Bear Creek at the vineyard of Gabriel Morlot were well known in the state. They won first place at the 17th Annual Illinois State Fair in 1869 in the categories of "Best Two Bottles of Catawba, Product of this State", "Best Two Bottles of Clinton, Product of this State", and "Best Two Bottles of Concord, Product of this State", earning three silver medals.

== Geography ==
According to the 2021 census gazetteer files, Bear Creek Township has a total area of 36.32 square miles (94.07 km^{2}), of which 36.26 square miles (93.91 km^{2}) (or 99.83%) is land and 0.06 square miles (0.16 km^{2}) (or 0.17%) is water.

=== Cities, towns, villages ===
- Basco

=== Cemeteries ===
The township contains these four cemeteries: Bethel, Graham, South Basco and West Basco.

Cozart Cemetery is located south of Elvaston in the middle of a field now farmed by the Geissler Brothers. This cemetery is timed in the 19th century and is also the resting place for Alexander K. Patterson, one of four war veterans buried in Hancock.

== Demographics ==
Historical population
Census	Pop.	Note	%±
1860	1,121		—
1870	1,117		−0.4%
1880	1,188		6.4%
1890	988		−16.8%
1900	978		−1.0%
1910	935		−4.4%
1920	886		−5.2%
1930	690		−22.1%
1940	698		1.2%
1950	660		−5.4%
1960	567		−14.1%
1970	516		−9.0%
1980	454		−12.0%
1990	399		−12.1%
2000	379		−5.0%
2010	345		−9.0%
2020	340		−1.4%
U.S. Decennial Census

As of the 2020 census there were 340 people, 124 households, and 85 families residing in the township. The population density was 9.36 inhabitants per square mile (3.61/km^{2}). There were 153 housing units at an average density of 4.21 per square mile (1.63/km^{2}). The racial makeup of the township was 97.06% White, 0.00% African American, 0.00% Native American, 0.00% Asian, 0.00% Pacific Islander, 0.00% from other races, and 2.94% from two or more races. Hispanic or Latino of any race were 1.18% of the population.

There were 124 households, out of which 21.00% had children under the age of 18 living with them, 62.90% were married couples living together, 4.03% had a female householder with no spouse present, and 31.45% were non-families. 29.80% of all households were made up of individuals, and 13.70% had someone living alone who was 65 years of age or older. The average household size was 2.19 and the average family size was 2.68.

The township's age distribution consisted of 22.1% under the age of 18, 0.0% from 18 to 24, 19.8% from 25 to 44, 26.4% from 45 to 64, and 31.6% who were 65 years of age or older. The median age was 53.7 years. For every 100 females, there were 123.0 males. For every 100 females age 18 and over, there were 130.4 males.

The median income for a household in the township was $55,625, and the median income for a family was $56,406. Males had a median income of $37,917 versus $31,875 for females. The per capita income for the township was $27,624. About 3.5% of families and 5.1% of the population were below the poverty line, including 11.7% of those under age 18 and none of those age 65 or over.

== School districts ==
- Hamilton Community Consolidated School District 328
- Southeastern Community Unit School District 337
- Warsaw Community Unit School District 316

== Political districts ==
- Illinois's 18th congressional district
- State House District 94
- State Senate District 47
