= Retta, Arkansas =

- Unincorporated community
- Position in Arkansas
- Coordinates: 35°31′00″N 92°56′57″W
- Country: United States
- State: Arkansas
- County: Pope
- Elevation: 676 ft (206 m)
- Time zone: UTC-6 (Central (CST))
  - Summer (DST): UTC-5 (CDT)
- GNIS feature ID: 73278

Retta is an unincorporated community in Jackson Township, Pope County, Arkansas, United States. It is a populated place located within the Township of Jackson, a minor civil division (MCD) of Pope County. The elevation of Retta is 679 feet. Retta was originally settled by a small group of families however none of the original settlers were able to make their homesteads last. The traces of a homestead lay in the east fork wilderness area along with rock walls around the homesite. Retta appears on the Solo U.S. Geological Survey Map. Pope County is in the Central Time Zone (UTC -6 hours). The local timezone is named "America/Chicago".
