= Bear Creek No. 6 Township, Searcy County, Arkansas =

Bear Creek No. 6 Township
- Township
- Location in Arkansas
- Coordinates: 35°54′16″N 92°36′32″W
- Country: United States
- State: Arkansas
- County: Searcy

Area
  - Total: 25.013 sq mi (64.78 km^{2})
  - Land: 24.917 sq mi (64.53 km^{2})
  - Water: 0.096 sq mi (0.25 km^{2})

Population (2010)
  - Total: 913
  - Density: 36.64/sq mi (14.15/km^{2})
- Time zone: UTC-6 (CST)
  - Summer (DST): UTC-5 (CDT)
- Zip Code: 72650 (Marshall)
- Area code: 870

Bear Creek No. 6 Township is one of 15 current townships in Searcy County, Arkansas, USA. As of the 2010 census, its total population was 913.

== Geography ==
According to the United States Census Bureau, Bear Creek No. 6 Township covers an area of 25.013 square miles (64.78 km^{2}); 24.917 square miles (64.53 km^{2}) of land and 0.096 square miles (0.25 km^{2}) of water.

=== Cities, towns, and villages ===
- Marshall (part)
