= Prairie Township, Searcy County, Arkansas =

Prairie Township
- Township
- Location in Arkansas
- Coordinates: 36°3′55″N 92°36′31″W
- Country: United States
- State: Arkansas
- County: Searcy

Area
  - Total: 39.811 sq mi (103.11 km^{2})
  - Land: 39.793 sq mi (103.06 km^{2})
  - Water: 0.096 sq mi (0.25 km^{2})

Population (2010)
  - Total: 550
  - Density: 36.64/sq mi (14.15/km^{2})
- Time zone: UTC-6 (CST)
  - Summer (DST): UTC-5 (CDT)
- Zip Code: 72669 (Pindall)
- Area code: 870

Prairie Township is one of fifteen townships in Searcy County, Arkansas, USA. As of the 2010 census, its total population was 550.

== Geography ==
According to the United States Census Bureau, Prairie Township covers an area of 39.811 square miles (103.11 km^{2}); 39.793 square miles (103.06 km^{2}) of land and 0.018 square miles (0.047 km^{2}) of water.

=== Cities, towns, and villages ===
- Pindall
