= Red Leaf, Arkansas =

Unincorporated community in Arkansas, US

Coordinates: 33°16′20″N 91°11′47″W

Red Leaf is an unincorporated community in Chicot County, Arkansas, United States.
