= Bear Creek Township, Boone County, Arkansas =

Bear Creek Township
- Former Township
- Interactive map of Bear Creek Township
- Coordinates: 36.44173°N 93.08351°W
- Country: United States
- State: Arkansas
- County: Boone
- Time zone: UTC-6 (CST)
  - Summer (DST): UTC-5 (CDT)
- Area code: 870

Bear Creek Township is a former township of Boone County, Arkansas, USA. Its last appearance on the US Census was in 1950.

Bear Creek Township was one of the original township subdivisions established within Boone County when the county was formed in 1869 from portions of Carroll and Marion counties. Records show that Bear Creek Township appeared in several U.S. Census enumerations from 1870 through 1950 before being discontinued as a census-reported subdivision.

== Population history ==
Census	Population
1950	291
1940	456
1930	421
1920	589
1910	435
1900	683
1890	856
1880	588
1870	314
1860 (area part of Carroll County at the time)	297
