= Bear Creek No. 5 Township, Searcy County, Arkansas =

Bear Creek No. 5 Township
- Township
- Location in Arkansas
- Coordinates: 35°54′35″N 92°38′47″W
- Country: United States
- State: Arkansas
- County: Searcy

Area
  - Total: 1.481 sq mi (3.84 km^{2})
  - Land: 1.479 sq mi (3.83 km^{2})
  - Water: 0.002 sq mi (0.0052 km^{2})

Population (2010)
  - Total: 728
  - Density: 492.22/sq mi (190.05/km^{2})
- Time zone: UTC-6 (CST)
  - Summer (DST): UTC-5 (CDT)
- Zip Code: 72650 (Marshall)
- Area code: 870

Bear Creek No. 5 Township is one of 15 current townships in Searcy County, Arkansas, USA. As of the 2010 census, its total population was 728.

== Geography ==
According to the United States Census Bureau, Bear Creek No. 5 Township covers an area of 1.481 square miles (3.84 km^{2}); 1.479 square miles (3.83 km^{2}) of land and 0.002 square miles (0.0052 km^{2}) of water.

=== Cities, towns, and villages ===
- Marshall (part)
