= Prairie Township, Boone County, Arkansas =

Prairie Township
- Township
- Location in Arkansas
- Coordinates: 36°9′19.06″N 92°54′54.74″W
- Country: United States
- State: Arkansas
- County: Boone

Area
  - Total: 16.272 sq mi (42.14 km^{2})
  - Land: 16.266 sq mi (42.13 km^{2})
  - Water: 0.006 sq mi (0.016 km^{2})

Population (2010)
  - Total: 444
  - Density: 27.36/sq mi (10.56/km^{2})
- Time zone: UTC-6 (CST)
  - Summer (DST): UTC-5 (CDT)
- Zip Code: 72633 (Everton)
- Area code: 870

Prairie Township is one of twenty current townships in Boone County, Arkansas, USA. As of the 2010 census, its total population was 444.

== Geography ==
According to the United States Census Bureau, Omaha Township covers an area of 78.986 square miles (204.57 km^{2}); 77.985 square miles (201.98 km^{2}) of land and 1.001 square miles (2.59 km^{2}) of water.

=== Cities, towns, and villages ===
- Everton

== Population history ==
Figures below include the population of the incorporated town of Everton.

Census	Population
2010	444
2000	487
1990	436
1980	433
1970	367
1960	348
1950	503
1940	579
1930	530
1920	721
1910	670
1900	500
1890	617
1880	667
1870	1,214
1860 (area part of Carroll County at the time)	1,205
1850 (area part of Carroll County at the time)	1,131
