= Prairie Township, Madison County, Arkansas =

Coordinates: 36.140250°N 93.870069°W

Prairie Township
- Township
- Location in Arkansas
- Country: United States
- State: Arkansas
- County: Madison

Area
  - Total: 52.18 sq mi (135.1 km^{2})
  - Land: 51.98 sq mi (134.6 km^{2})
  - Water: 0.2 sq mi (0.52 km^{2})

Population (2010)
  - Total: 1,632
  - Density: 31.4/sq mi (12.1/km^{2})

Prairie Township is one of 21 inactive townships in Madison County, Arkansas, USA. As of the 2010 census, its population was 1,632.

Prairie Township was established before 1850, but the exact date is unknown because early county records were lost.

== Cities, towns and villages ==
- Hindsville
