= Searcy County, Arkansas =

County in Arkansas, United States

- County
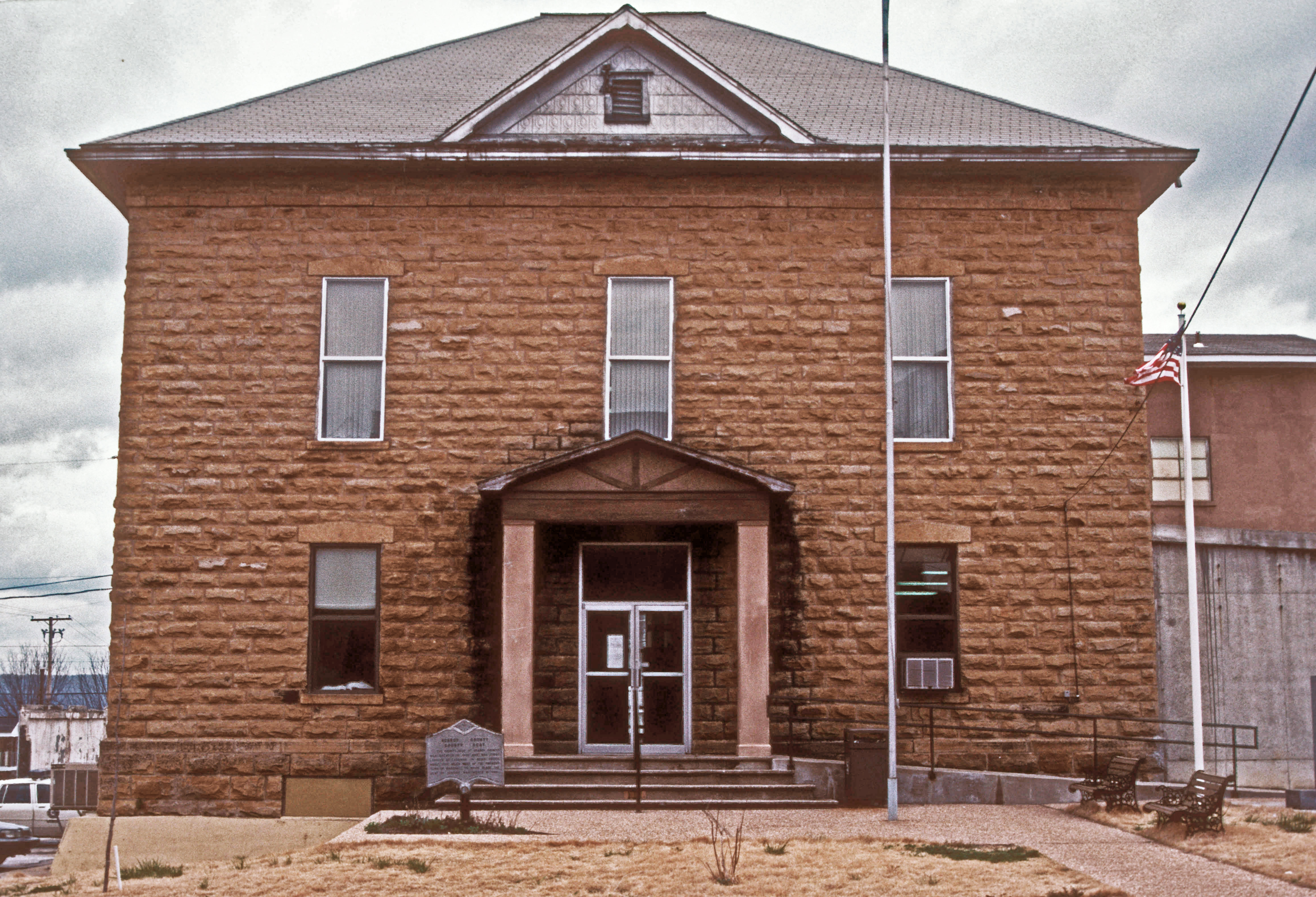
- Searcy County Courthouse

- Flag

- Location within the U.S. state of Arkansas
- Coordinates: 35°55′32″N 92°42′00″W
- Country: United States
- State: Arkansas
- Founded: December 13, 1838
- Named for: Richard Searcy
- Seat: Marshall
- Largest city: Marshall

Area
  - Total: 669 sq mi (1,730 km^{2})
  - Land: 666 sq mi (1,720 km^{2})
  - Water: 2.4 sq mi (6.2 km^{2}) 0.4%

Population (2020)
  - Total: 7,828
  - Estimate (2025): 7,848 ▲
  - Density: 11.8/sq mi (4.54/km^{2})
- Time zone: UTC−6 (Central)
  - Summer (DST): UTC−5 (CDT)
- Congressional district: 1st
- Website: https://searcyco.org/

Searcy County (/ˈsɜːrsi/ SUR-see) is a county located in the U.S. state of Arkansas. As of the 2020 census, the population was 7,828. The county seat is Marshall. The county was formed December 13, 1838, from a portion of Marion County and named for Richard Searcy, the first clerk and judge in the Arkansas Territory. The city of Searcy, Arkansas, some 70 miles away, shares the name despite having never been part of Searcy County. The county is an alcohol prohibition or dry county.

== History ==
During the American Civil War, Searcy County, Arkansas had strong, pro-Union leanings, forming an organization known as the "Arkansas Peace Society".

== Chocolate Roll Capital of the World ==
The Chocolate Roll is a dessert endemic to Searcy but little known outside the near region. A typical Chocolate Roll is made from pie dough spread with a mixture of cocoa powder, shortening, and sugar, then rolled up and baked. In 2012 The Greater Searcy County Chamber of Commerce declared Searcy County the "Chocolate Roll Capital of the World™", and asserted trademarks. Since 2012 Marshall High School has hosted an annual Chocolate Roll Festival that includes the World Champion Chocolate Roll Contest. The 6th was held on March 18, 2017.

== Geography ==
According to the U.S. Census Bureau, the county has a total area of 669 square miles (1,730 km^{2}), of which 666 square miles (1,720 km^{2}) is land and 2.4 square miles (6.2 km^{2}) (0.4%) is water.

=== Major highways ===
- U.S. Highway 65
- Arkansas Highway 14
- Arkansas Highway 16
- Arkansas Highway 27
- Arkansas Highway 66
- Arkansas Highway 74
- Arkansas Highway 235
- Arkansas Highway 254
- Arkansas Highway 333
- Arkansas Highway 374
- Arkansas Highway 377

=== Adjacent counties ===
- Marion County (north)
- Baxter County (northeast)
- Stone County (east)
- Van Buren County (south)
- Pope County (southwest)
- Newton County (west)
- Boone County (northwest)

=== National protected areas ===
- Buffalo National River (part)
- Ozark National Forest (part)

== Demographics ==
Historical population
Census	Pop.	Note	%±
1840	936		—
1850	1,979		111.4%
1860	5,271		166.3%
1870	5,614		6.5%
1880	7,278		29.6%
1890	9,664		32.8%
1900	11,988		24.0%
1910	14,825		23.7%
1920	14,590		−1.6%
1930	11,056		−24.2%
1940	11,942		8.0%
1950	10,424		−12.7%
1960	8,124		−22.1%
1970	7,731		−4.8%
1980	8,847		14.4%
1990	7,841		−11.4%
2000	8,261		5.4%
2010	8,195		−0.8%
2020	7,828		−4.5%
2025 (est.)	7,848	▲	0.3%
U.S. Decennial Census; 1790–1960 1900–1990; 1990–2000 2010

=== 2020 census ===
As of the 2020 census, the county had a population of 7,828. The median age was 48.8 years. 19.9% of residents were under the age of 18 and 25.2% of residents were 65 years of age or older. For every 100 females there were 98.4 males, and for every 100 females age 18 and over there were 97.0 males age 18 and over.

The racial makeup of the county was 91.0% White, 0.1% Black or African American, 0.9% American Indian and Alaska Native, 0.3% Asian, 0.1% Native Hawaiian and Pacific Islander, 0.6% from some other race, and 7.1% from two or more races. Hispanic or Latino residents of any race comprised 1.8% of the population.

<0.1% of residents lived in urban areas, while 100.0% lived in rural areas.

There were 3,441 households in the county, of which 24.6% had children under the age of 18 living in them. Of all households, 48.9% were married-couple households, 21.2% were households with a male householder and no spouse or partner present, and 25.1% were households with a female householder and no spouse or partner present. About 32.9% of all households were made up of individuals and 17.1% had someone living alone who was 65 years of age or older.

There were 4,705 housing units, of which 26.9% were vacant. Among occupied housing units, 78.1% were owner-occupied and 21.9% were renter-occupied. The homeowner vacancy rate was 2.3% and the rental vacancy rate was 12.7%.

=== 2000 census ===
As of the 2000 census, there were 8,261 people, 3,523 households, and 2,466 families residing in the county. The population density was 12 people per square mile (4.6 people/km^{2}). There were 4,292 housing units at an average density of 6 units per square mile (2.3 units/km^{2}). The racial makeup of the county was 97.26% White, 0.04% Black or African American, 0.75% Native American, 0.15% Asian, 0.01% Pacific Islander, 0.45% from other races, and 1.34% from two or more races. 1.04% of the population were Hispanic or Latino of any race.

There were 3,523 households, out of which 27.90% had children under the age of 18 living with them, 58.50% were married couples living together, 7.70% had a female householder with no husband present, and 30.00% were non-families. 28.00% of all households were made up of individuals, and 14.30% had someone living alone who was 65 years of age or older. The average household size was 2.33 and the average family size was 2.83.

In the county, the population was spread out, with 22.70% under the age of 18, 6.90% from 18 to 24, 24.50% from 25 to 44, 26.70% from 45 to 64, and 19.20% who were 65 years of age or older. The median age was 42 years. For every 100 females there were 98.00 males. For every 100 females age 18 and over, there were 94.80 males.

The median income for a household in the county was $21,397, and the median income for a family was $27,580. Males had a median income of $21,768 versus $16,276 for females. The per capita income for the county was $12,536. About 17.80% of families and 23.80% of the population were below the poverty line, including 31.00% of those under age 18 and 26.60% of those age 65 or over.

== Government and politics ==
=== Government ===
The county government is a constitutional body granted specific powers by the Constitution of Arkansas and the Arkansas Code. The quorum court is the legislative branch of the county government and controls all spending and revenue collection. Representatives are called justices of the peace and are elected from county districts every even-numbered year. The number of districts in a county vary from nine to fifteen, and district boundaries are drawn by the county election commission. The Searcy County Quorum Court has nine members. Presiding over quorum court meetings is the county judge, who serves as the chief operating officer of the county. The county judge is elected at-large and does not vote in quorum court business, although capable of vetoing quorum court decisions.

Searcy County, Arkansas Elected countywide officials
Position	Officeholder	Party
County Judge	Tony Horton	Republican
County/Circuit Clerk	Cassy Ward	(Unknown)
Sheriff/Collector	Kenny Cassell	Republican
Treasurer	Mary Beth Martin	Republican
Assessor	Randy Crumley	Republican
Coroner	Jerry Patterson	Republican

The composition of the Quorum Court following the 2024 elections is 9 Republicans. Justices of the Peace (members) of the Quorum Court following the elections are:

- District 1: Rob Woods (R)
- District 2: Kim D. Loftin (R)
- District 3: James Matt Smith (R)
- District 4: Danny Loggins (R)
- District 5: Wayne Witcher (R)
- District 6: Joel Brian Ragland (R)
- District 7: Jason Ragland (R)
- District 8: Cindi Silor (R)
- District 9: Jerry Loggins (R)

Additionally, the townships of Stone County are entitled to elect their own respective constables, as set forth by the Constitution of Arkansas. Constables are largely of historical significance as they were used to keep the peace in rural areas when travel was more difficult. The township constables as of the 2024 elections are:

- District 1: Bill Sellers (R)
- District 2: Troy Dye (R)

=== Politics ===
Along with adjacent Newton County, Searcy is unique among Arkansas counties in being traditionally Republican in political leanings even during the overwhelmingly Democratic "Solid South" era. This Republicanism resulted from their historical paucity of slaves, in turn created by infertile soils unsuitable for intensive cotton farming, and produced support for the Union during the Civil War. These were the only two counties in Arkansas to be won by Alf Landon in 1936, Wendell Willkie in 1940, Charles Evans Hughes in 1916, and even Calvin Coolidge in 1924. In Presidential elections post-1932, Harry S. Truman and Jimmy Carter are the only Democrats to carry the county. In the 1992 election George H. W. Bush won his second-highest margin in the state, despite former Arkansas governor Bill Clinton being the Democratic nominee. In fact, Republican nominee Bob Dole also carried the county 4 years later despite Clinton's success almost everywhere else in the state. Republicans have received over 60 percent of the vote in the county in every election since 2000. In 2016, Donald Trump received more than 79 percent of the vote in the county, while former Arkansas First Lady Hillary Clinton received just 16 percent. In 2020, Trump received more than 83 percent of the vote, and in 2024 he received over 85%. Trump's performances in each of these elections are the best of any candidate in the county's history.

United States presidential election results for Searcy County, Arkansas
Year	Republican		Democratic		Third party(ies)	
Year	No.	%	No.	%	No.	%
1896	737	54.35%	615	45.35%	4	0.29%
1900	869	60.52%	567	39.48%	0	0.00%
1904	709	61.55%	404	35.07%	39	3.39%
1908	636	45.69%	597	42.89%	159	11.42%
1912	514	45.41%	438	38.69%	180	15.90%
1916	919	59.37%	629	40.63%	0	0.00%
1920	1,070	60.80%	594	33.75%	96	5.45%
1924	797	60.33%	415	31.42%	109	8.25%
1928	1,425	69.65%	606	29.62%	15	0.73%
1932	846	46.79%	947	52.38%	15	0.83%
1936	1,010	56.81%	767	43.14%	1	0.06%
1940	1,292	56.72%	982	43.11%	4	0.18%
1944	1,409	61.07%	891	38.62%	7	0.30%
1948	1,064	45.74%	1,205	51.81%	57	2.45%
1952	1,996	66.44%	1,007	33.52%	1	0.03%
1956	2,441	72.35%	909	26.94%	24	0.71%
1960	2,297	68.55%	1,022	30.50%	32	0.95%
1964	1,649	52.13%	1,508	47.68%	6	0.19%
1968	1,909	56.83%	724	21.55%	726	21.61%
1972	3,163	78.76%	853	21.24%	0	0.00%
1976	2,699	45.91%	3,180	54.09%	0	0.00%
1980	2,459	58.79%	1,536	36.72%	188	4.49%
1984	2,819	67.10%	1,313	31.25%	69	1.64%
1988	2,743	66.21%	1,340	32.34%	60	1.45%
1992	1,772	44.48%	1,679	42.14%	533	13.38%
1996	1,786	45.00%	1,669	42.05%	514	12.95%
2000	2,610	64.32%	1,229	30.29%	219	5.40%
2004	2,565	64.25%	1,370	34.32%	57	1.43%
2008	2,726	70.86%	961	24.98%	160	4.16%
2012	2,699	73.06%	814	22.04%	181	4.90%
2016	2,955	79.27%	601	16.12%	172	4.61%
2020	3,365	83.73%	588	14.63%	66	1.64%
2024	3,305	85.42%	511	13.21%	53	1.37%

The county is in Arkansas's 1st congressional district, which from Reconstruction until 2010 sent only Democrats to the U.S. House. That year, it elected Republican Rick Crawford, who currently holds the seat as of 2023. In the Arkansas House of Representatives Searcy County is represented by first-term Republican Steven Walker from the 27th district. The state senator, Missy Thomas Irvin, is also a Republican, serving her fourth term from the 24th district.

Since 1980, in gubernatorial races, the county has tended to favor Republicans in all but one contest. It voted for Frank White in his successful run against freshman Democratic incumbent Bill Clinton in 1980. It supported White again in 1982 and 1986 in rematches with Clinton. It also voted for Woody Freeman over Clinton in 1984. It was the only county in Arkansas where Republican Sheffield Nelson won in both 1990 and 1994. In 1990, it was Nelson's best county in the entire state, winning 64 percent to then-Governor Bill Clinton's 36 percent in Searcy County. In 1994, Searcy County was among the two counties to vote for Nelson over incumbent Democrat Jim Guy Tucker, Benton County being the other (which actually voted for Clinton over Nelson in 1990).

In 1998, Searcy County voted for Republican Mike Huckabee with just under 70 percent, and again in 2002, albeit with a reduced margin of 57 percent. In 2006, it voted 52 percent for Republican ex-Congressman Asa Hutchinson, who lost to Democrat Mike Beebe. In 2010, however, it did vote for incumbent Democrat Mike Beebe with a margin of 57 percent to 40 percent over former state Senator Jim Keet, the first time it had done so since 1978. Keet was regarded as a weak candidate, as he failed to carry a single county.

== Education ==
Public education is provided for early childhood, elementary and secondary education from multiple school districts including:

- Searcy County School District, which includes Marshall High School
- Ozark Mountain School District, which includes Searcy County-based St. Joe Elementary School (also it formerly had St. Joe High School)
- Hector School District
- Mountain View School District
- Yellville-Summit School District

== Communities ==
=== Cities ===
- Leslie
- Marshall (county seat)

=== Towns ===
- Big Flat (mostly in Baxter County)
- Gilbert
- Pindall
- St. Joe

=== Census-designated places ===
- Witts Springs

=== Unincorporated communities ===
- Cozahome
- Harriet

=== Townships ===
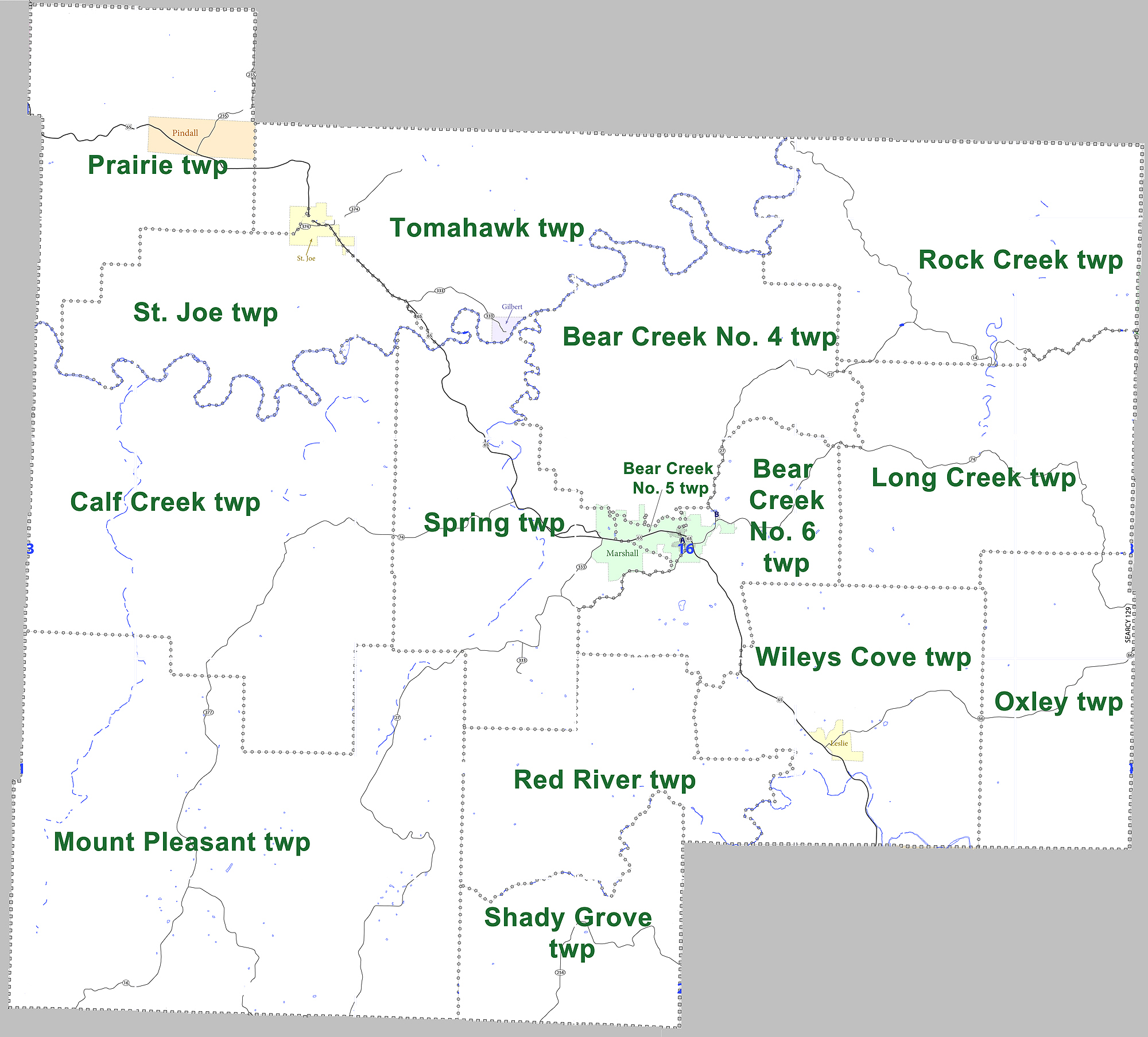
Townships in Searcy County, Arkansas as of 2010

Townships in Arkansas are the divisions of a county. Each township includes unincorporated areas; some may have incorporated cities or towns within part of their boundaries. Arkansas townships have limited purposes in modern times. However, the United States census does list Arkansas population based on townships (sometimes referred to as "county subdivisions" or "minor civil divisions"). Townships are also of value for historical purposes in terms of genealogical research. Each town or city is within one or more townships in an Arkansas county based on census maps and publications. The townships of Searcy County are listed below; listed in parentheses are the cities, towns, and/or census-designated places that are fully or partially inside the township.

Township	FIPS code	ANSI code (GNIS ID)	Population center(s)	Pop. (2010)	Pop. density (/mi^{2})	Pop. density (/km^{2})	Land area (mi^{2})	Land area (km^{2})	Water area (mi^{2})	Water area (km^{2})	Geographic coordinates
Bear Creek No. 4	05-90177	02406938	Marshall	989	21.20	8.18	46.655	120.8	0.174	0.4507	35.971174°N 92.623964°W
Bear Creek No. 5	05-90178	02406939	Marshall	728	492.22	190.08	1.479	3.831	0.002	0.005180	35.909629°N 92.646337°W
Bear Creek No. 6	05-90179	02406940	Marshall	913	36.64	14.15	24.917	64.53	0.096	0.2486	35.904425°N 92.608797°W
Calf Creek	05-90708	00066892		326	4.01	1.55	81.202	210.3	0.514	1.331	35.903196°N 92.846919°W
Long Creek	05-92274	00069086		474	10.72	4.14	44.219	114.5	0.060	0.1554	35.923104°N 92.487694°W
Mount Pleasant	05-90981	00066895		465	4.28	1.65	108.750	281.7	0.248	0.6423	35.789412°N 92.842860°W
Oxley	05-92801	02407397		364	11.37	4.39	32.018	82.93	0.027	0.06993	35.867295°N 92.463161°W
Prairie	05-93012	00069090	Pindall	550	13.82	5.34	39.793	103.1	0.018	0.04662	36.065325°N 92.891250°W
Red River	05-93087	00069091		321	9.69	3.78	33.144	85.84	0.064	0.1658	35.815267°N 92.687262°W
Rock Creek	05-93213	00069093		547	10.48	3.99	52.915	137.0	0.097	0.2512	36.021866°N 92.496667°W
St. Joe	05-93279	00069094	St. Joe	390	13.07	5.05	29.838	77.28	0.239	0.6190	35.986869°N 92.854089°W
Shady Grove	05-93351	00069095		189	4.41	2.87	42.834	110.9	0.971	2.515	35.743664°N 92.655141°W
Spring	05-93456	00069096	Marshall	588	12.59	4.86	46.715	121.0	0.227	0.5879	35.904585°N 92.710556°W
Tomahawk	05-93618	00069098	Gilbert, St. Joe	574	10.68	4.12	53.762	139.2	0.421	1.090	36.036902°N 92.715763°W
Wileys Cove	05-94062	00069099	Leslie	777	17.18	6.63	45.225	117.1	0.210	0.5439	35.855434°N 92.519860°W
Source: U.S. Census Bureau

== See also ==
- List of lakes in Searcy County, Arkansas
- National Register of Historic Places listings in Searcy County, Arkansas
