= St. Joe, Arkansas =

- Town
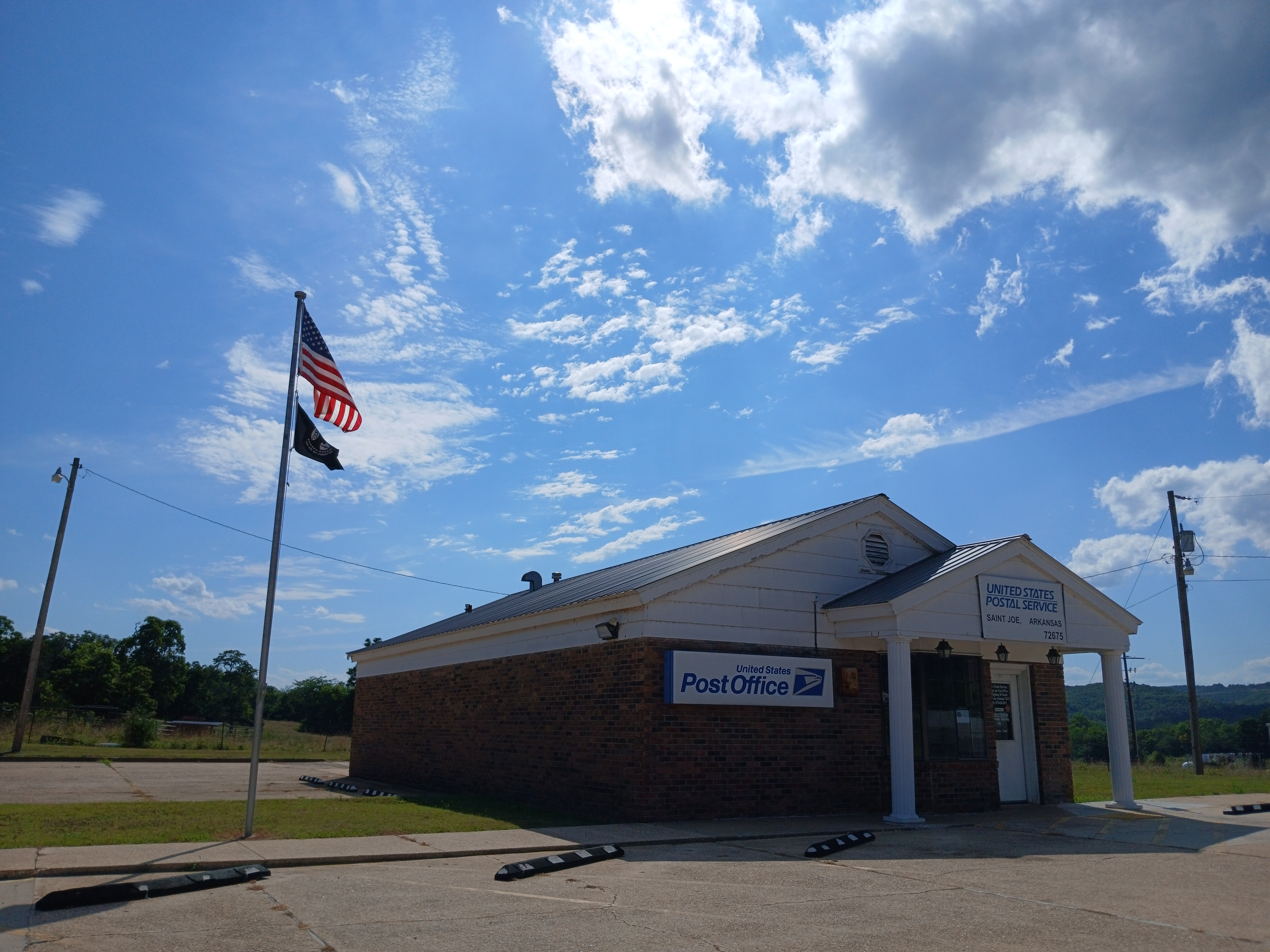
- St. Joe post office, July 2024

- Location of St. Joe in Searcy County, Arkansas.
- Coordinates: 36°01′44″N 92°48′28″W
- Country: United States
- State: Arkansas
- County: Searcy

Area
  - Total: 1.25 sq mi (3.23 km^{2})
  - Land: 1.24 sq mi (3.22 km^{2})
  - Water: 0.0039 sq mi (0.01 km^{2})
- Elevation: 778 ft (237 m)

Population (2020)
  - Total: 129
  - Estimate (2025): 132 ▲
  - Density: 103.9/sq mi (40.11/km^{2})
- Time zone: UTC-6 (Central (CST))
  - Summer (DST): UTC-5 (CDT)
- ZIP code: 72675
- Area code: 870
- FIPS code: 05-62030
- GNIS feature ID: 2407269

St. Joe or Saint Joe is a town in Searcy County, Arkansas, United States. As of the 2020 census, St. Joe had a population of 129.

== Geography ==
According to the United States Census Bureau, the town has a total area of 0.8 square miles (2.1 km^{2}), all land.

== Major highway ==
- U.S. Highway 65

== History ==
The town of St. Joe, Arkansas, was founded a few miles north of the Buffalo River around 1860 by Bill Campbell, Ben Henley Sr., Dr. George Turney, Captain Harry Love, Decatur Robinson, and Matt Tyson. Mill Creek, near the current post office on U.S. Highway 65, was the original town location. Wagon trains traveled from the town to Springfield, Missouri, where produce was sold and goods were purchased and brought back to the stores. The History and Folklore of Searcy County Arkansas states that St. Joe was originally called Monkey Run. The area came by its current name around 1900, when six miners from St. Joseph, Missouri, received the largest quantity of mail to come into the post office. The outpost eventually became known as St. Joe, Arkansas. Mines, and rumors of mines, feature largely in the story of St. Joe's past. It is worth noting that one of the nearby settlements is named Silver Hill. According to one fable, there is a “Lost Silver Mine” that was reputed to be fabulously rich in the late 1800s, believed to be located somewhere between Calf Creek and Bear Creek and worked by an Indian named Woodward. A news article in the Marshall Mountain Wave, printed Friday, May 30, 1924, stated that the lost silver mine had been found by a girl searching for a lost cow. The opening, covered by vegetation, was in a gulch. The silver and mining equipment was claimed to have been found, sitting for 75 years in the mine.

Historian James Johnson claims that the Lost Silver Mine does not exist, despite many stories. He says that there was an “Indian Woodard” whose descendants still live in Arkansas, but that most of the remaining legend is untrue.

The railroad arrived in St. Joe in 1902 and operated until 1946. Mined ores were shipped from St. Joe via the Missouri and North Arkansas Railroad, whose depot, faithfully restored to its early 20th-century appearance, sits on U.S. Highway 65 in the middle of the present town of St. Joe. The St. Joe Lime and Crushed Rock Company flourished with the mining boom, operating in a quarry just west of town. It is said that St. Joe set the standard for lime and crushed limestone throughout the world at this time. Johnson says that St. Joe's heyday was during World War I with the mines.

It was during this period that the Henley Hotel, still standing to the north of Highway 65 across from the Depot, was built around 1914. St. Joe's population was about 2,300 people from 1917 to 1921. The town boasted four stores, two hotels, a blacksmith, bank, mills, cafes, and post office. The first school was an 18’ x 18’ log building that was also the church and lodge hall. There was a grist mill and several physicians. The railroad's arrival and Highway 65 being paved caused many businesses to relocate to highway frontage, what is now called “new town” by old-time residents. The Citizens’ Bank was in business from 1913 to 1933.

After World War I the price of zinc dropped and it was no longer economically feasible to continue mining. The railroad to some extent depended upon the mines, and when mining stopped, this hurt the railroad. The town continued as a local outlet for produce, cattle, cotton, and timber, but population and industry gradually diminished, and the railroad pulled out in 1946.

== Present day ==
In time, the town dropped its incorporation. In the late 1990s, there was renewed interest in having an incorporated town. People wanted to have a local government again in order to have local direction of what happened in their lives. Because of a state law requiring a minimum of 175 registered voters in order to incorporate, a new incorporation could not be done. Instead, the charter for what was called the "Old Town" was reactivated.

Since the modern incorporation (or reactivation), people on the edge of the town have asked to be included. The town has grown by over 100 acres.

Today, the 1920s era buildings, ghostly remnants of a more prosperous past, sit mostly abandoned, interspersed with a gas station, a post office, and the St. Joe school. On the outskirts are a couple of motels and eateries, which cater to tourist traffic.

While no longer a hub for farming and mining in the region, it remains an important part of the history of the Ozarks and a gateway to some of the most popular recreational areas on the Buffalo River. The revitalization of the town is evident in the restoration of its historic buildings and the creation of the Rural Help Center as a hub of community education and services.

== Recent developments ==
In early 2011, the town received a grant of just over $10,000 from the Arkansas Rural Community Grant Program. The grant requires that the amount be matched locally. Volunteer hours can contribute to the match. One of the plans for the money is to refurbish the historic Missouri and North Arkansas Railroad depot in St. Joe.

In mid-2012 St. Joe launched a website featuring the town and surrounding communities. The website focuses on the history and natural assets of the area including the Buffalo River.

St. Joe is one of thirteen communities participating in Ozark Byways which promotes small towns in the north central Arkansas region.

In October 2012 the Searcy County Rural Help Center was launched in St. Joe. The nonprofit organization is staffed by volunteers and makes computers, internet, and training available to community members. The North Arkansas Career Center teaches night classes for adults working toward their GED. A Kids Corner is open on Saturdays.

== Education ==
St. Joe is in the Ozark Mountain School District. The district operates St. Joe Elementary School and Ozark Mountain High School. The latter is located in the former Western Grove High School, which consolidated into Ozark Mountain High in 2023.

On July 1, 2004, the former St. Joe School District consolidated into the Ozark Mountain School District. The consolidated district operated St. Joe High School, on a K-12 campus in the town of St. Joe, until 2023, when it consolidated into Ozark Mountain High School.

== Demographics ==
Historical population
| Census | Pop. | Note | %± |
|---|---|---|---|
| 1910 | 159 | | — |
| 1920 | 181 | | 13.8% |
| 1930 | 255 | | 40.9% |
| 2000 | 85 | | — |
| 2010 | 132 | | 55.3% |
| 2020 | 129 | | −2.3% |
| 2025 (est.) | 132 | ▲ | 2.3% |
U.S. Decennial Census

As of the census of 2000, there were 85 people, 41 households, and 23 families residing in the town. The population density was 111.8 inhabitants per square mile (43.2/km^{2}). There were 50 housing units at an average density of 65.7 per square mile (25.4/km^{2}). The racial makeup of the town was 92.94% White, 4.71% Native American, and 2.35% from two or more races.

There were 41 households, out of which 24.4% had children under the age of 18 living with them, 39.0% were married couples living together, 14.6% had a female householder with no husband present, and 41.5% were non-families. 39.0% of all households were made up of individuals, and 12.2% had someone living alone who was 65 years of age or older. The average household size was 2.07 and the average family size was 2.67.

In the town, the population was spread out, with 21.2% under the age of 18, 8.2% from 18 to 24, 27.1% from 25 to 44, 23.5% from 45 to 64, and 20.0% who were 65 years of age or older. The median age was 40 years. For every 100 females, there were 93.2 males. For every 100 females age 18 and over, there were 97.1 males.

The median income for a household in the town was $20,000, and the median income for a family was $36,250. Males had a median income of $20,000 versus $15,625 for females. The per capita income for the town was $12,238. There were no families and 4.1% of the population living below the poverty line, including no under eighteens and none of those over 64.

== Notable people ==
- Ben C. Henley - Republican state chairman from 1955 to 1962, born in St. Joe
- J. Smith Henley - federal judge, born in St. Joe
