= Marshall High School (Arkansas) =

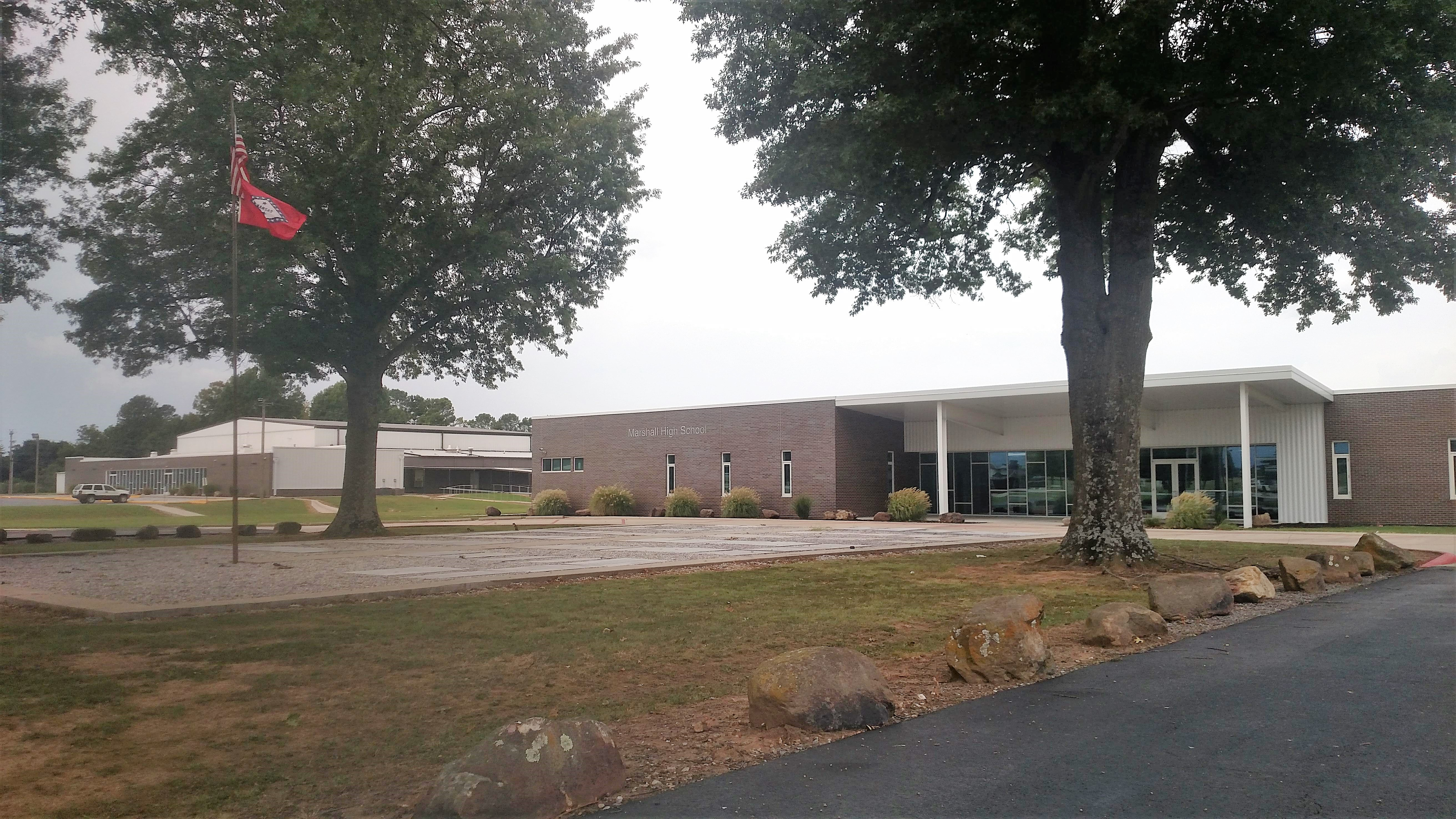

Location
- 950 U.S. Highway 65 North; Marshall, Arkansas 72650; United States
- Coordinates: 35°55′17″N 92°39′32″W

Information
- Type: Public secondary
- School district: Searcy County School District
- NCES District ID: 0509480
- CEEB code: 041580
- NCES School ID: 050948000693
- Faculty: 60.87 (on FTE basis)
- Grades: 7–12
- Student to teacher ratio: 5.93
- Colors: Black and White
- Athletics conference: 3A Region 1 (2012-14)
- Mascot: Bobcats
- Team name: Marshall Bobcats
- Website: mhs.scsd.info/en-US

Marshall High School (MHS) is a comprehensive public secondary school in Marshall, Arkansas, United States. It is one of two public high schools in Searcy County and the sole high school administered by the Searcy County School District. In 2003 the high school had 350 students.

== History ==
Originally the Marshall School District operated the school. On July 1, 1993, the Tri-County School District dissolved, with the Marshall district taking a portion of it. On July 1, 2003, the Witts Springs School District consolidated into the Marshall district; Witts Spring High School closed, making Witts Springs residents a part of the Marshall HS attendance zone. On July 1, 2004, the Marshall district and the Leslie School District consolidated to form the Searcy County School District. In 2007 Leslie High School closed, and now Leslie residents were a part of the Marshall HS attendance zone.

== Academics ==
The assumed course of study follows the Smart Core curriculum developed by the Arkansas Department of Education (ADE), which requires students to complete at least 22 units to graduate. Students complete regular (core and career focus) courses and exams and may select Advanced Placement coursework and exams that provide an opportunity for college credit. The school is accredited by the ADE and has been accredited by AdvancED since 2009.

== Athletics ==
The Marshall High School mascot and athletic emblem is the Bobcat. Black and white are the school colors.

For 2012-14, the Marshall Bobcats compete in the 3A Classification within the 3A Region 1 Conference as sanctioned by the Arkansas Activities Association (AAA). Interscholastic activities include football, volleyball, basketball (boys/girls), baseball, softball, cheer and track (boys/girls).

The girls basketball team won back-to-back state championships in 2007 and 2008.

== Notable alumni ==
- David Branscum (1977) - Republican member of the Arkansas House of Representatives since 2011
