= Branscum =

Branscum is a surname. Notable people with the surname include:

- David Branscum, American politician
- Eric Branscum (born 1984), American screenwriter
- Josh Branscum (born 1982), American politician
- Robbie Branscum (1934–1997), American author
