= Witts Springs, Arkansas =

- Census-designated place
- Location within Arkansas Location within the United States
- Coordinates: 35°46′22″N 92°52′02″W
- Country: United States
- State: Arkansas
- County: Searcy
- Elevation: 1,808 ft (551 m)

Population (2020)
  - Total: 33
- Time zone: UTC-6 (Central (CST))
  - Summer (DST): UTC-5 (CDT)
- ZIP code: 72686
- Area code: 870
- GNIS feature ID: 2805699

Witts Springs is an unincorporated community and census-designated place (CDP) in Searcy County, Arkansas, United States. It was first listed as a CDP in the 2020 census with a population of 33. Witts Springs is located on Arkansas Highway 16, 16.5 miles (26.6 km) southwest of Marshall. Witts Springs has a post office with ZIP code 72686. John Campbell who served in Mexico and the Confederate Army and who was a county surveyor and judge as well as a state senator for two terms had his post office at Witts Springs.

== Education ==
The community is served by the Searcy County School District, which operates Marshall High School.

On July 1, 2003, the Witts Springs School District consolidated into the Marshall School District. On July 1, 2004, the Marshall district and the Leslie School District consolidated to form the Searcy County district. In 2003 the high school portion of the Witts Springs School was moved to Marshall, and in 2004 the Witts Springs School closed altogether due to a low student enrollment.

== Demographics ==
Historical population
Census	Pop.	Note	%±
2020	33		—
U.S. Decennial Census; 2020

=== 2020 census ===
Witts Springs, Arkansas – Demographic Profile (NH = Non-Hispanic) Note: the US Census treats Hispanic/Latino as an ethnic category. This table excludes Latinos from the racial categories and assigns them to a separate category. Hispanics/Latinos may be of any race.
Race / Ethnicity	Pop 2020	% 2020
White alone (NH)	25	75.76%
Black or African American alone (NH)	0	0.00%
Native American or Alaska Native alone (NH)	0	0.00%
Asian alone (NH)	0	0.00%
Pacific Islander alone (NH)	0	0.00%
Some Other Race alone (NH)	0	0.00%
Mixed Race/Multi-Racial (NH)	4	12.12%
Hispanic or Latino (any race)	4	12.12%
Total	33	100.00%
