= Harriet, Arkansas =

- Unincorporated community
- Location within Arkansas Location within the United States
- Coordinates: 35°59′36″N 92°31′14″W
- Country: United States
- State: Arkansas
- County: Searcy
- Elevation: 896 ft (273 m)
- Time zone: UTC-6 (Central (CST))
  - Summer (DST): UTC-5 (CDT)
- ZIP code: 72639
- Area code: 870
- GNIS feature ID: 77126

Harriet is an unincorporated community in Searcy County, Arkansas, United States. Harriet is located at the junction of Arkansas highways 14 and 27, 8.5 miles (13.7 km) northeast of Marshall. Harriet has a post office with ZIP code 72639. Harriet is only 6.4 miles from the Buffalo National River, and an industry of river guiding and canoeing supplies has cropped up around the whitewater river. The community is also very close to the Ozark-St. Francis National Forest. The Blanchard Springs Caverns are only 25 miles to the east. The Basingers are a prominent family living in the Harriet area, and are distantly related to actress Kim Basinger.

== Education ==
Harriet is within the Searcy County School District.

Harriet had been in what was the Marshall School District. On July 1, 2004, the Marshall School District and the Leslie School District consolidated to form the Searcy County School District, with the Marshall district annexing Leslie. All children in Searcy County are bussed to Marshall for school.
