= Farmers Bank Building (Leslie, Arkansas) =

- U.S. National Register of Historic Places
- U.S. Historic district – Contributing property
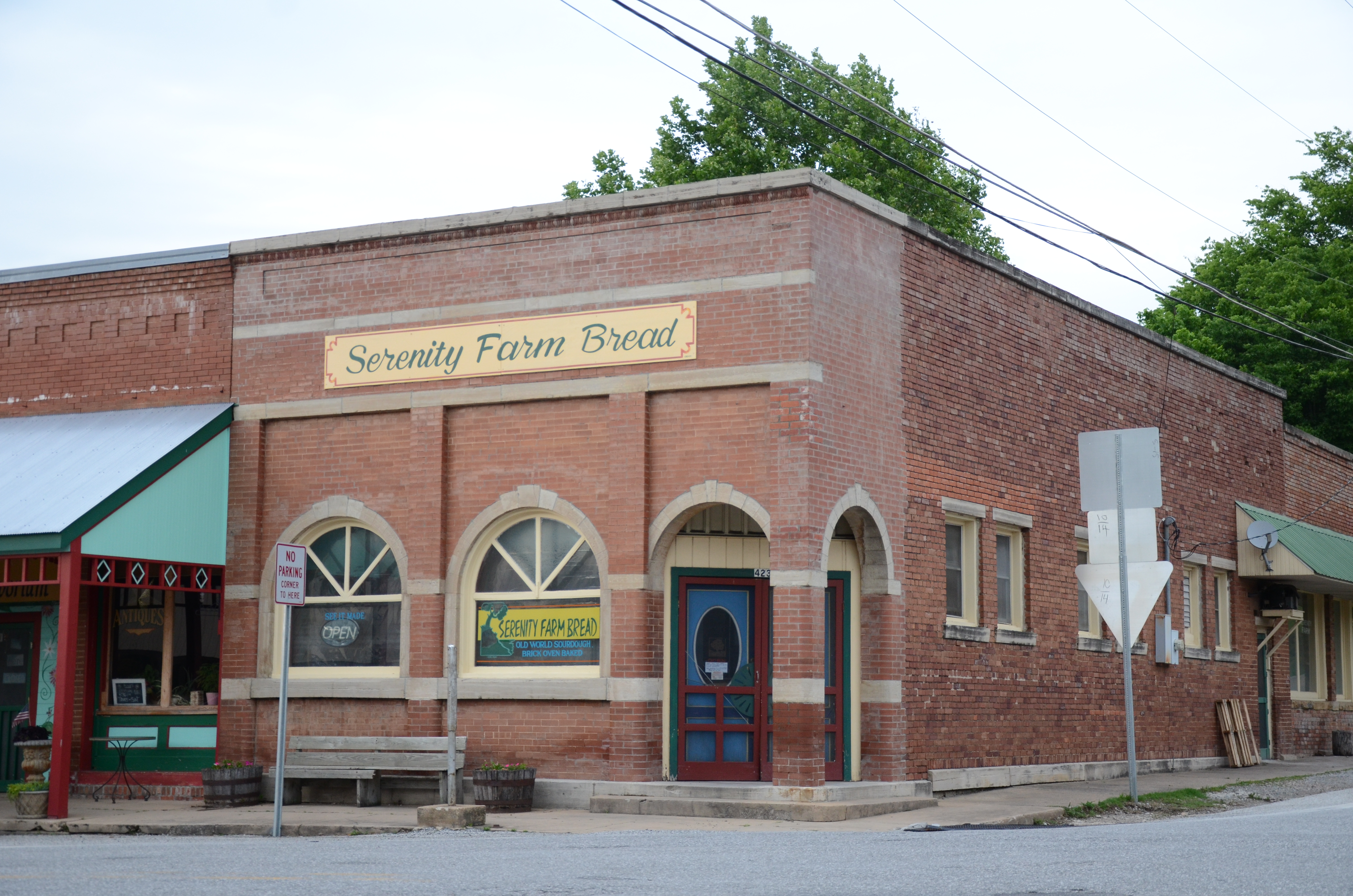

- Location within Arkansas Location within the United States
- Location: Jct. of Main and Walnut Sts., Leslie, Arkansas
- Coordinates: 35°49′44″N 92°33′35″W
- Area: less than one acre
- Built: 1910
- Architectural style: Romanesque
- Part of: Leslie Commercial Historic District (ID100001257)
- MPS: Searcy County MPS
- NRHP reference No.: 93000753

Significant dates
- Added to NRHP: August 18, 1993
- Designated CP: July 3, 2017

The Farmers Bank Building is a historic commercial building at Main and Walnut Streets in Leslie, Arkansas. It is a single-story brick structure, with its entrance angled at the street corner. The main facade is three bays wide (including the angled entrance), all with round arches trimmed in limestone. Built around 1910, this Romanesque Revival building house the Farmers Bank until it failed in the 1930s, and then the local post office for a time.

The building was listed on the National Register of Historic Places in 1993.

== See also ==
- National Register of Historic Places listings in Searcy County, Arkansas
