= American Legion Post No. 131 =

- U.S. National Register of Historic Places
- U.S. Historic district – Contributing property
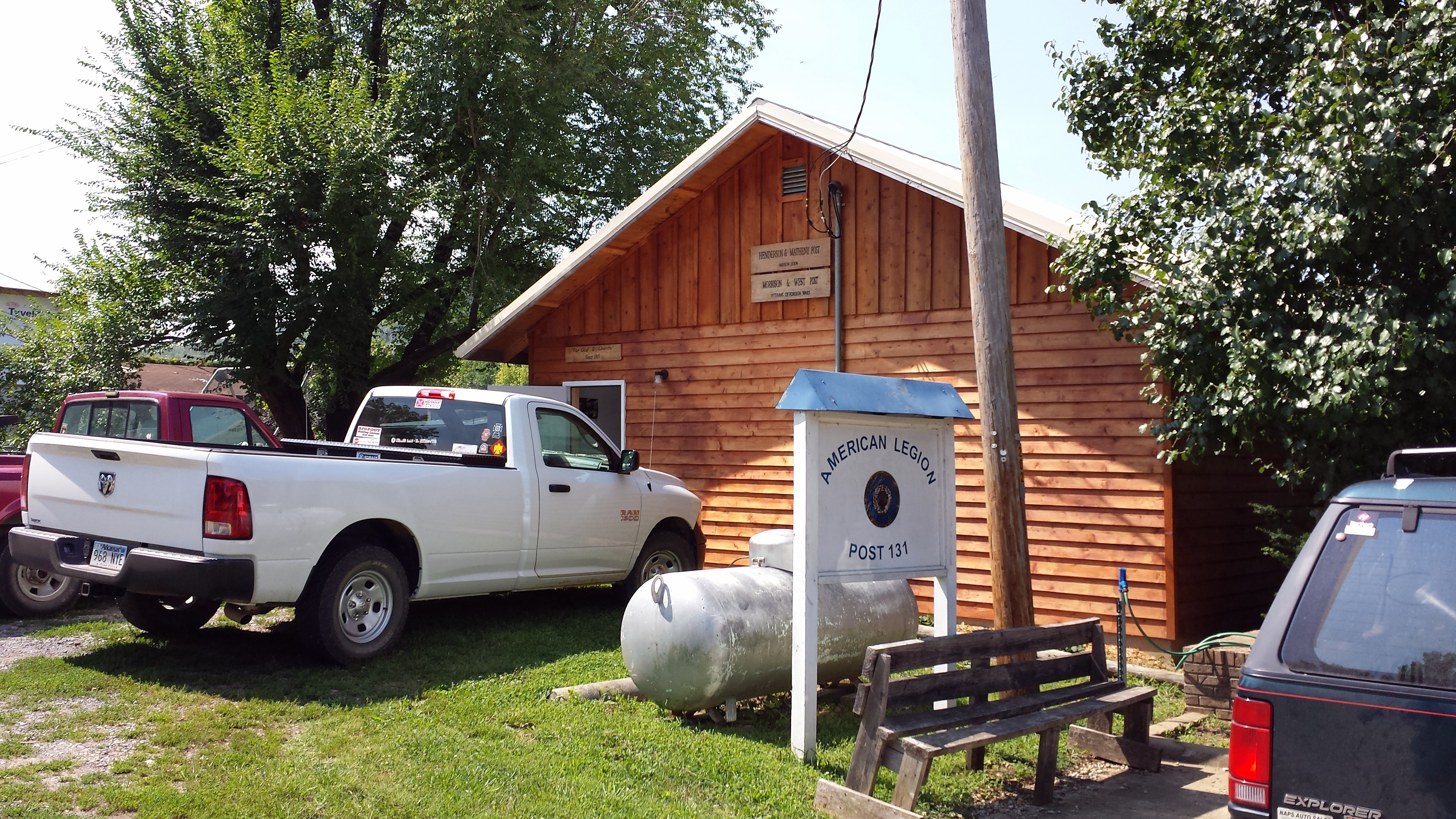

- Location within Arkansas Location within the United States
- Location: Center St. W of jct. with Walnut St., Leslie, Arkansas
- Coordinates: 35°49′46″N 92°33′36″W
- Area: less than one acre
- Built: 1935
- Built by: Works Progress Administration
- Architect: Lloyd Harness
- Part of: Leslie Commercial Historic District (ID100001257)
- MPS: Searcy County MPS
- NRHP reference No.: 93001369

Significant dates
- Added to NRHP: December 02, 1993
- Designated CP: July 3, 2017

The American Legion Post No. 131 is a historic meeting hall on Center St. west of its junction with Walnut St., in Leslie, Arkansas. It is a single-story log structure, with a gable roof that extends over the front porch, with large knee braces in the Craftsman style for support. It was built in about 1935 with funding support from the Works Progress Administration (WPA). Its log styling is typical of the Rustic architecture used in WPA projects.

The building was listed on the U.S. National Register of Historic Places in 1993.

== See also ==
- National Register of Historic Places listings in Searcy County, Arkansas
