= 2024 Arkansas Republican presidential primary =

- March 5, 2024

40 Republican National Convention delegates

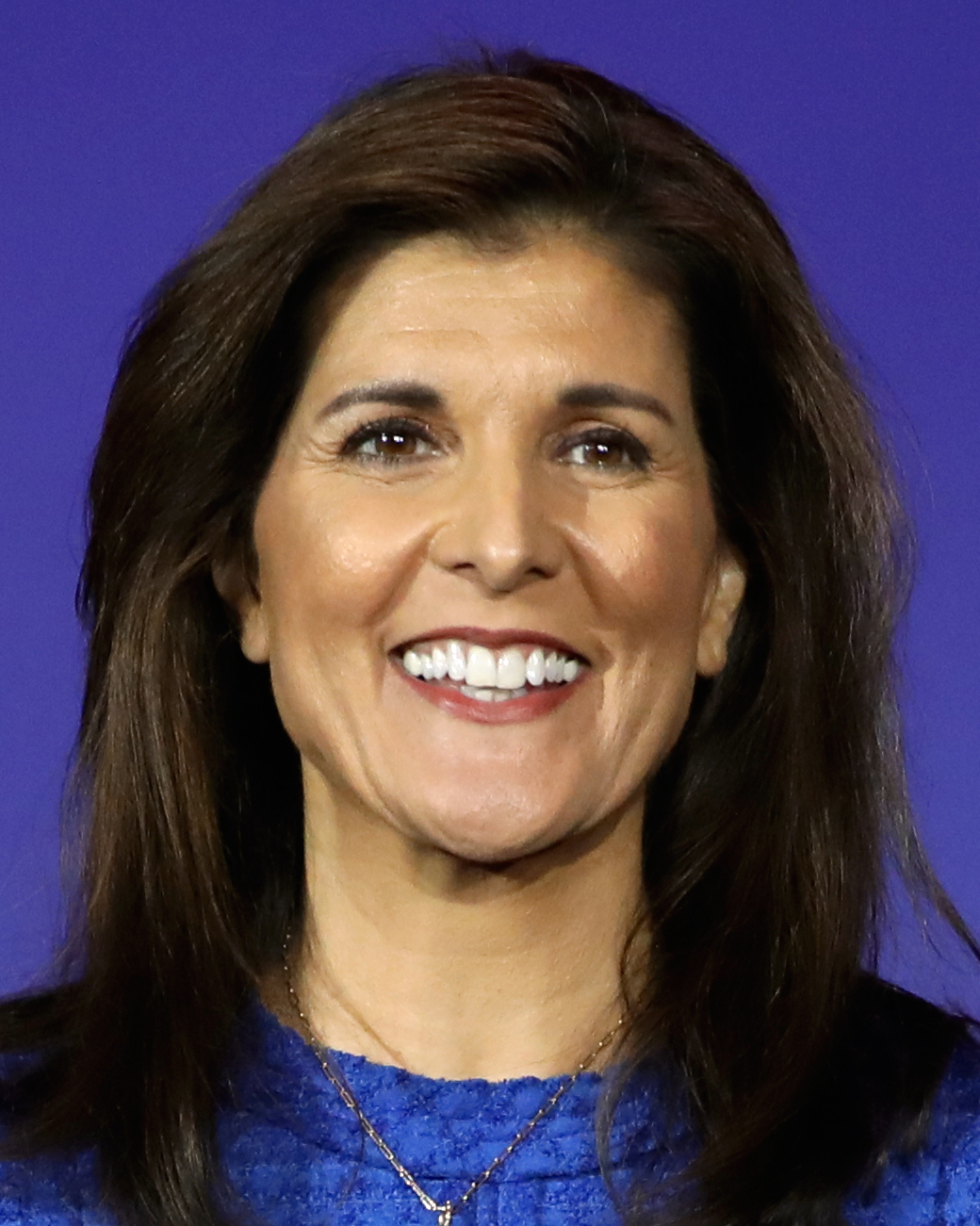
Candidate	Donald Trump	Nikki Haley
Home state	Florida	South Carolina
Delegate count	39	1
Popular vote	204,898	49,085
Percentage	76.89%	18.42%

Trump
50–60%
60–70%
70–80%
80–90%
>90%

The 2024 Arkansas Republican presidential primary was held on March 5, 2024, as part of the Republican Party primaries for the 2024 presidential election. 40 delegates to the 2024 Republican National Convention were allocated on a winner-take-most basis. The contest was held on Super Tuesday alongside primaries in 14 other states. Donald Trump won 39 delegates from this contest. Nikki Haley received one delegate because any candidate who wins at least 15 percent of the statewide vote in Arkansas Republican presidential primary is guaranteed at least 1 delegate.

== Candidates ==
The following candidates have officially filed by the end of the filing deadline on November 14, 2023:

- Ryan Binkley (withdrew on February 27, 2024)
- Doug Burgum (withdrew on December 4, 2023)
- Chris Christie (withdrew on January 10, 2024)
- Ron DeSantis (withdrew on January 21, 2024)
- Asa Hutchinson (withdrew on January 16, 2024)
- Nikki Haley
- Vivek Ramaswamy (withdrew on January 15, 2024)
- David Stuckenberg
- Donald Trump

== Endorsements ==
Nikki Haley

Governor

- Asa Hutchinson, (2015–2023); former candidate
Ron DeSantis (withdrawn)

State representatives

- Zack Gramlich, District 50 (2023–present) (Note: Article mistakenly says Arizona)
- Aaron Pilkington, District 45 (2017–present)
- Ryan Rose, District 48 (2022–present)
Asa Hutchinson (withdrawn)

County official

- Barry Moehring, Benton County Judge (2016–present)

Mayor

- Stephanie Orman, Mayor of Bentonville (2018–present)
Donald Trump

U.S. Senator

- Tom Cotton, (2015–present)

U.S. Representative

- Rick Crawford, AR-01 (2011–present)

Governors

- Mike Huckabee, (1996–2007); candidate for President in 2008 and 2016
- Sarah Huckabee Sanders, (2023-present); White House Press Secretary (2017–2019)
Declined to endorse

U.S. Senator

- John Boozman, (2011–present)

U.S. Representative

- French Hill, AR-02 (2015–present)

Organization

- Republican Party of Arkansas

== Polling ==
Poll source	Date(s) administered	Sample size (Note: Key: A – all adults RV – registered voters LV – likely voters V – unclear)	Margin of error	Ron DeSantis	Donald Trump	Undecided
Echelon Insights	Aug 31 – Sep 7, 2022	184 (LV)	± 7.7%	29%	58%	13%

== Results ==
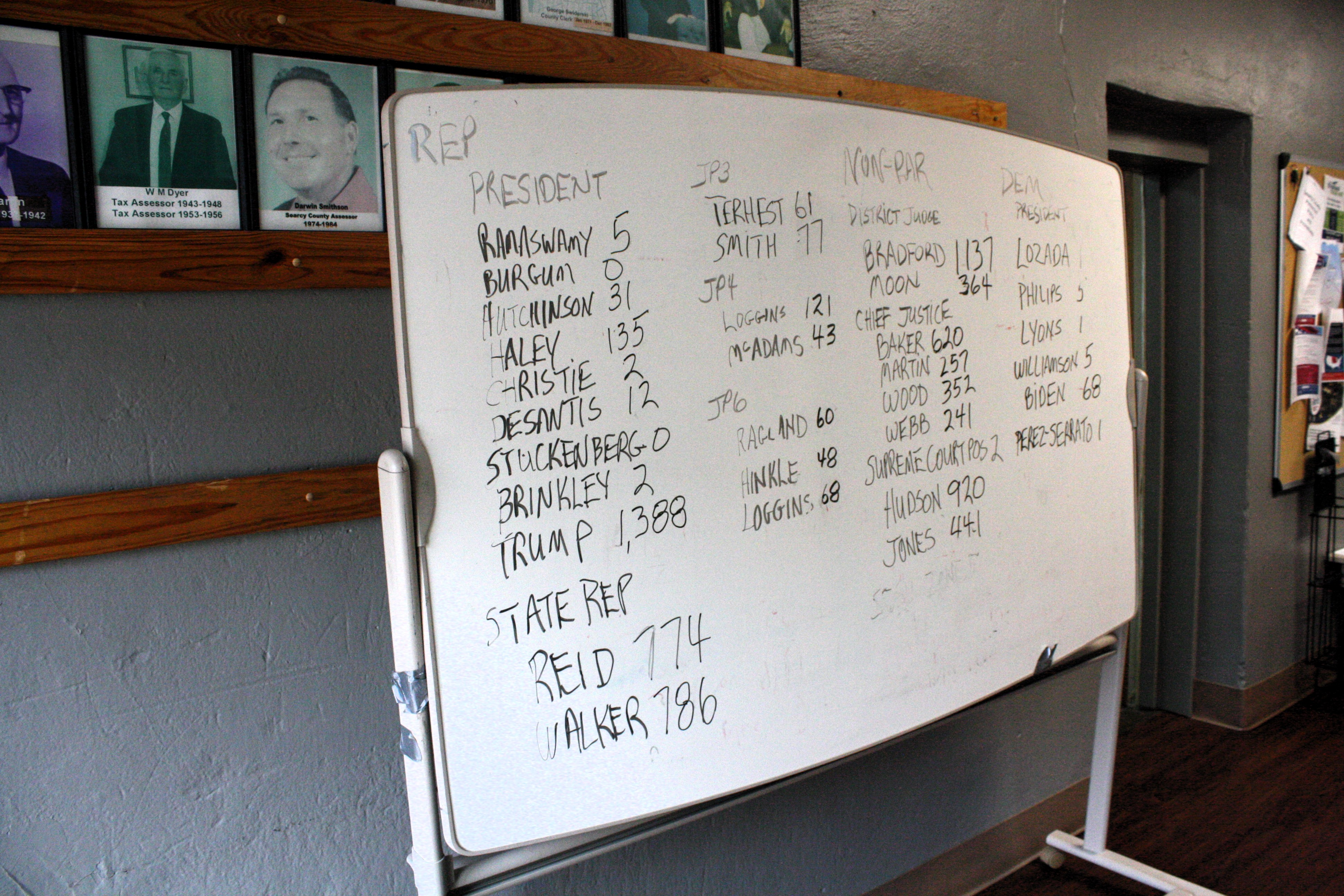
Election results of the 2024 primary election posted in the Searcy County Courthouse

Arkansas Republican primary, March 5, 2024
Candidate	Votes	Percentage	Actual delegate count		
Candidate	Votes	Percentage	Bound	Unbound	Total
Donald Trump	204,898	76.89%	39		39
Nikki Haley	49,085	18.42%	1		1
Asa Hutchinson (withdrawn)	7,377	2.77%			
Ron DeSantis (withdrawn)	3,162	1.19%			
Vivek Ramaswamy (withdrawn)	860	0.32%			
Chris Christie (withdrawn)	600	0.23%			
Ryan Binkley (withdrawn)	183	0.07%			
Doug Burgum (withdrawn)	157	0.06%			
David Stuckenberg	151	0.06%			
Total:	266,473	100.00%	40		40

== See also ==
- 2024 Republican Party presidential primaries
- 2024 Arkansas Democratic presidential primary
- 2024 United States presidential election
- 2024 United States presidential election in Arkansas
- 2024 United States elections
