= Meek Building =

- U.S. National Register of Historic Places
- U.S. Historic district – Contributing property
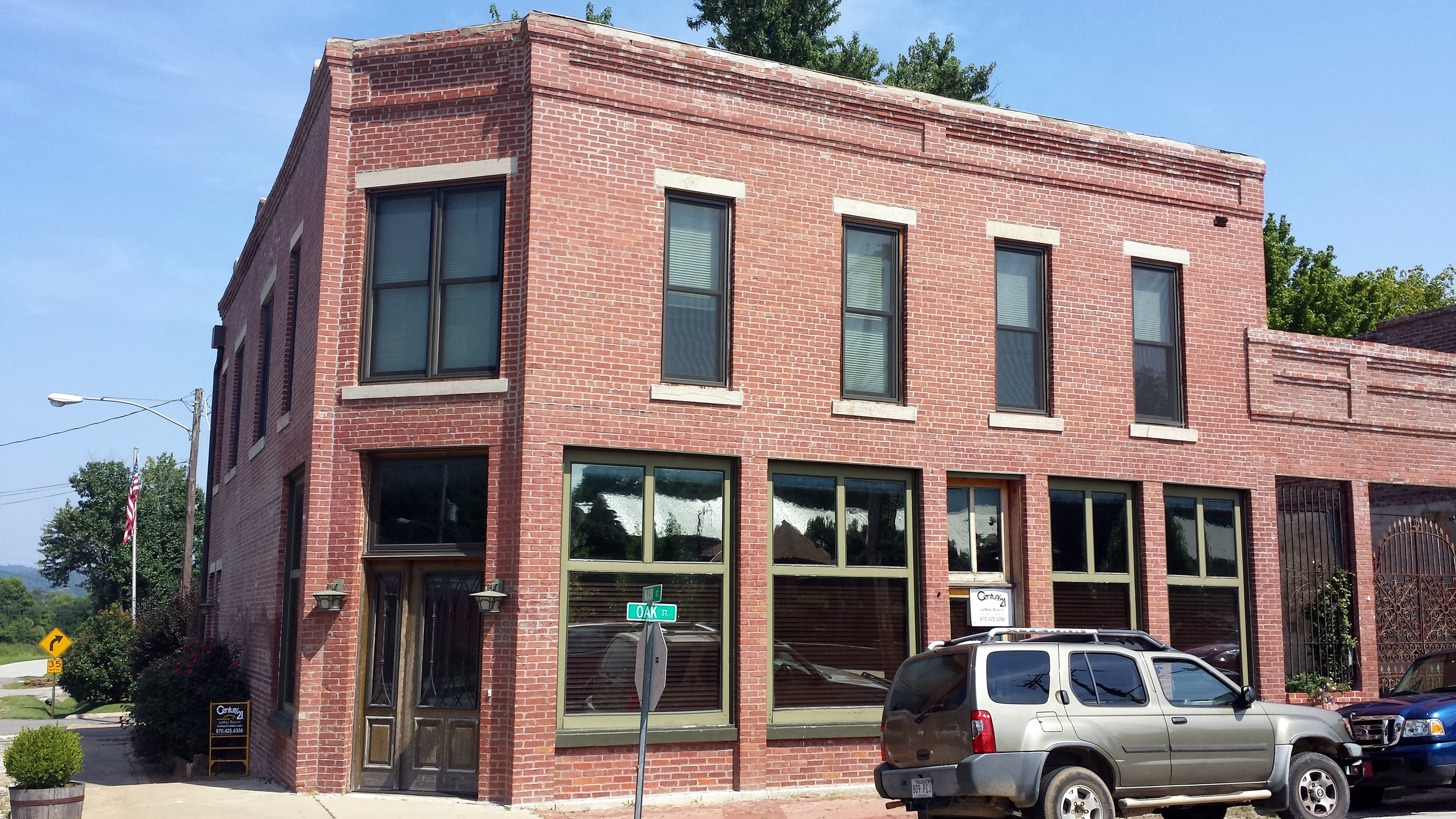

- Location within Arkansas Location within the United States
- Location: Jct. of Main and Oak Sts., Leslie, Arkansas
- Coordinates: 35°49′47″N 92°33′36″W
- Area: less than one acre
- Built: 1907
- Architectural style: Early Commercial
- Part of: Leslie Commercial Historic District (ID100001257)
- NRHP reference No.: 00001367

Significant dates
- Added to NRHP: November 15, 2000
- Designated CP: July 3, 2017

The Meek Building, also known as the Hogg Building, is a historic commercial building at Main and Oak Streets in Leslie, Arkansas. It is a two-story brick building, with a flat roof obscured by a parapet. Its main entrance is in an angled section at the street corner, with a second store entrance facing Oak Street. Built about 1907, it is one of the oldest commercial buildings in the city, and has long been a local landmark, first housing the grocery of Roy Meek and then the meat shop of G. W. Hogg.

The building was listed on the National Register of Historic Places in 2000.

== See also ==
- National Register of Historic Places listings in Searcy County, Arkansas
