= Leslie Commercial Historic District =

- U.S. National Register of Historic Places
- U.S. Historic district
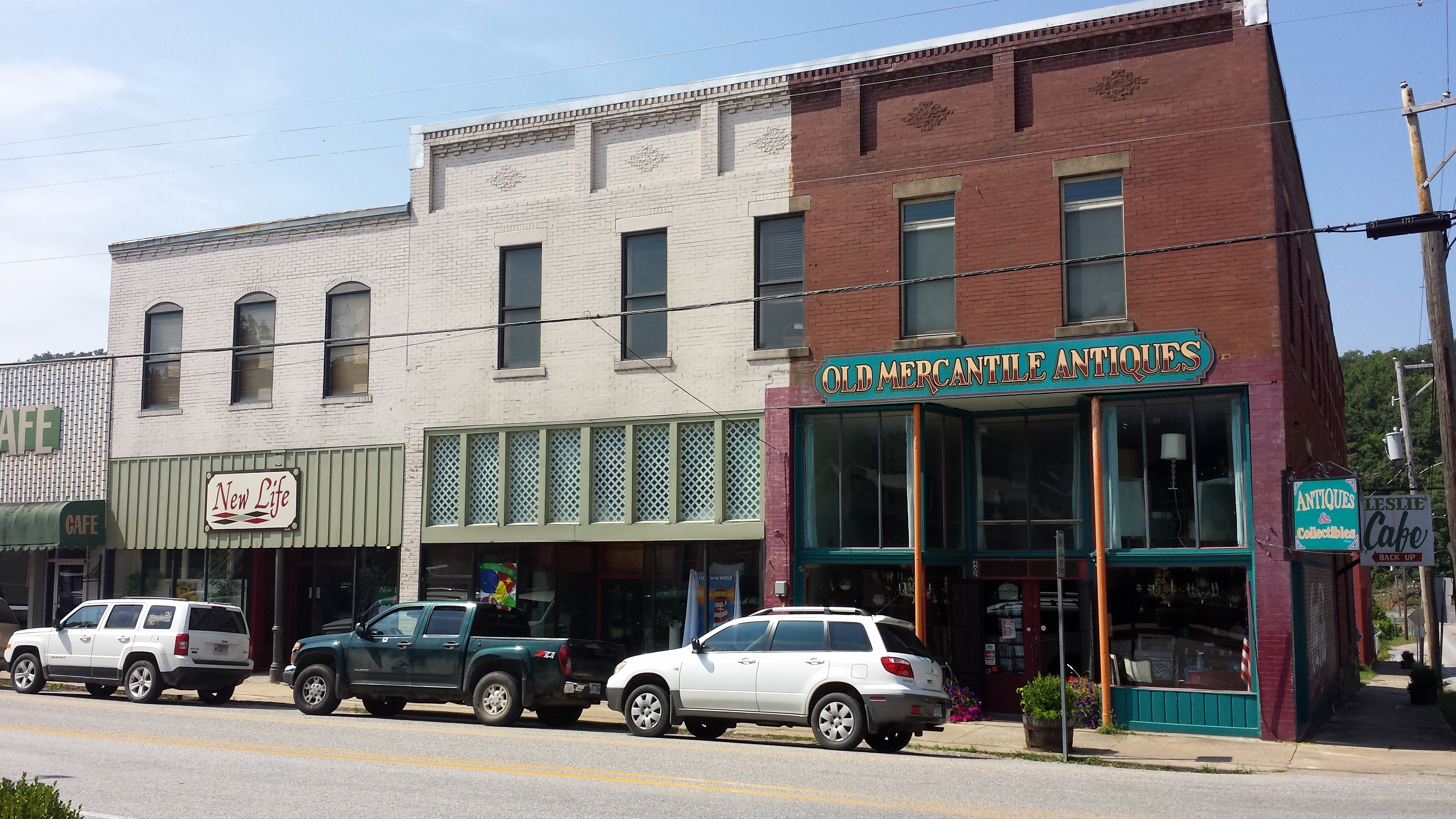

- Location within Arkansas Location within the United States
- Location: 319-424 Main and 205 Oak Sts., Leslie, Arkansas
- Coordinates: 35°49′46″N 92°33′36″W
- Area: 4.77 acres (1.93 ha)
- Built: 1905
- Architectural style: Twentieth Century Standard Commercial
- NRHP reference No.: 100001257
- Added to NRHP: July 3, 2017

The Leslie Commercial Historic District encompasses a one-block historic area of downtown Leslie, Arkansas. The basically linear district runs on Main Street between Oak and Walnut Streets, and includes 18 buildings and a small city park. Most of the buildings were built in the early decades of the 20th century, and are one and two-story brick buildings.

The district was listed on the National Register of Historic Places in 2017. Previously listed buildings in the district include the American Legion Post No. 131, the Farmers Bank Building, and the Meek Building.

== See also ==
- National Register of Historic Places listings in Searcy County, Arkansas
