= Roy Ragland =

American politician

Member of the Arkansas House of Representatives from the 90th district
- In office January 10, 2005 – January 10, 2011
- Preceded by: Mike Hathorn
- Succeeded by: David Branscum

Personal details
- Born: April 2, 1957 (age 68); Marshall, Arkansas, U.S.
- Political party: Republican
- Relatives: Donald Ragland (brother)

Roy Ragland (born April 2, 1957) is an American politician who served in the Arkansas House of Representatives from the 90th district from 2005 to 2011.
