= Mike Hathorn =

American politician

Member of the Arkansas House of Representatives
- In office January 11, 1999 – January 10, 2005
- Preceded by: Charles Whorton Jr.
- Succeeded by: Roy Ragland
- Constituency: 24th district (1999‍–‍2003); 90th district (2003‍–‍2005)

Personal details
- Born: Michael Carl Hathorn; October 11, 1973 (age 52) Huntsville, Arkansas, U.S.
- Party: Democratic
- Education: University of Arkansas (BA, JD)
- Occupation: Lawyer; farmer; politician

Michael Carl Hathorn (born October 11, 1973) is an American politician who served in the Arkansas House of Representatives from 1999 to 2005.
