= Charles Whorton Jr. =

American politician (1924–2023)

Member of the Arkansas House of Representatives
- In office January 14, 1991 – January 11, 1999
- Preceded by: Kevin Hatfield
- Succeeded by: Mike Hathorn
- Constituency: 17th district (1991‍–‍1993); 24th district (1993‍–‍1999)

Personal details
- Born: March 16, 1924; Aurora, Arkansas, U.S.
- Died: January 24, 2023 (aged 98); Huntsville, Arkansas, U.S.
- Political party: Democratic
- Spouse: Edith Alice May Taylor (m. 1945; died 1994)
- Occupation: Farmer; politician; judge

Military service
- Branch/service: United States Army
- Battles/wars: World War II; European theater

Charles Whorton Jr. (March 16, 1924 – January 24, 2023) was an American farmer and politician. A native of the town of Aurora in Madison County, Arkansas, he served as county clerk from 1955 to 1972, after which he was county judge until his retirement in 1988. In 1990, he was elected to the Arkansas House of Representatives and went on to serve four two-year terms.
