= 2024 Arkansas Democratic presidential primary =

- March 5, 2024

36 delegates (31 pledged, 5 unpledged) to the Democratic National Convention

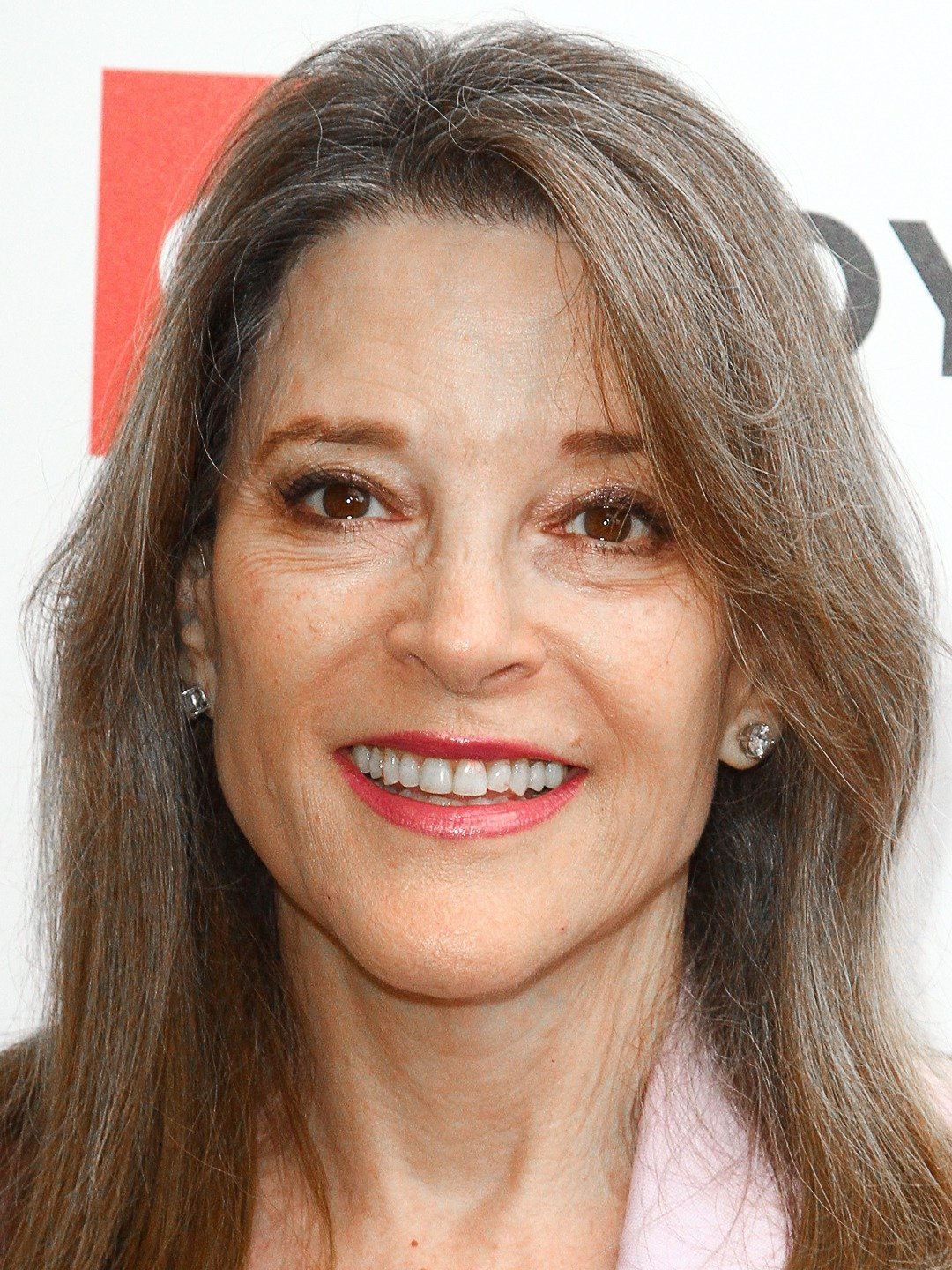
Candidate	Joe Biden	Marianne Williamson
Home state	Delaware	Washington, D.C.
Delegate count	31	0
Popular vote	71,978	3,883
Percentage	88.5%	4.8%
County results
Biden
70–80%
80–90%
>90%

The 2024 Arkansas Democratic presidential primary took place on March 5, 2024, as part of the Democratic Party primaries for the 2024 presidential election. 31 delegates to the Democratic National Convention were allocated, with 5 additional unpledged delegates. The open primary was held on Super Tuesday alongside primaries in 14 other states and territories.

Incumbent president Joe Biden won 89% of the vote and all 31 delegates, ahead of author Marianne Williamson with around 5% of the vote.

== Candidates ==
The following candidates achieved ballot access.

- Joe Biden
- Frank Joseph Lozada
- Stephen Lyons Sr.
- Armando Perez-Serrato
- Dean Phillips
- Marianne Williamson

=== Disqualified candidates ===
- Cenk Uygur

== Endorsements ==
Joe Biden

U.S. Presidents

- Bill Clinton, 42th President of the United States (1993–2001), Governor of Arkansas (1983–1992)

Former cabinet-level officials

- Hillary Clinton, U.S. Secretary of State (2009–2013); U.S. Senator from New York (2001–2009); First Lady of the United States (1993–2001); First Lady of Arkansas (1979–1981 and 1983–1992); Chancellor of Queen's University Belfast (2020–present); Democratic nominee for U.S. President in 2016

== Results ==
2024 Arkansas Democratic pres. primary
Candidate	Votes	%	Delegates
Joe Biden (incumbent)	71,978	88.52	31
Marianne Williamson	3,883	4.78	0
Dean Phillips	2,346	2.89	0
Stephen Lyons	1,442	1.77	0
Armando Perez-Serrato	879	1.08	0
Frankie Lozada	786	0.97	0
Total	81,314	100%	31

== See also ==
- 2024 Arkansas Republican presidential primary
- 2024 Democratic Party presidential primaries
- 2024 United States presidential election
- 2024 United States presidential election in Arkansas
- 2024 United States elections
