= Witts Springs School District =

Defunct school district in Arkansas, United States

Witts Springs School District No. 1 was a school district headquartered in Witts Springs in unincorporated Searcy County, Arkansas.

The district's final superintendent was Glenda Hendrix.

== History ==
On July 2, 2001, an act of arson caused the destruction of the district's elementary school and gymnasium facilities.

On July 1, 2003, the Witts Springs School District consolidated into the Marshall School District. The Arkansas Department of Education ordered the consolidation to occur. The final board meeting of the Witts Springs district was scheduled for Thursday June 26, 2003. Hendrix was to become an assistant superintendent at the Marshall district on a part-time basis but was required to not have a job for a month in between jobs. On July 1, 2004, the Marshall district and the Leslie School District consolidated to form the Searcy County School District, which currently governs the Witts Springs territory.
