= Searcy County School District =

School district in Arkansas

Address
- 952 U.S. Highway 65 North Marshall, Arkansas, 72650; United States

District information
- Grades: PK–12
- Accreditation: ADE; AdvancED
- Schools: 4
- NCES District ID: 0509480

Students and staff
- Students: 962
- Teachers: 85.35 (on FTE basis)
- Staff: 204.35 (on FTE basis)
- Student–teacher ratio: 11.27
- Colors: Black and white

Other information
- Website: scsd.info

Searcy County School District No. 17 (SCSD), formerly Marshall School District #17 (MSD), is a public school district headquartered in Marshall, Arkansas. The school district encompasses 538.90 square miles (1,395.7 km^{2}) of land in Searcy, Van Buren and Marion counties. Prior to the 2004 merger with the Leslie School District, the Marshall school district served portions of Searcy and Marion counties.

The district serves all of Marshall and Leslie, the unincorporated area of Witts Spring, a small section of Dennard, and the Searcy County portion of Big Flat. It also serves Harriet.

== History ==
The Arkansas Legislature created the Marshall School District in 1909 as a special act.

In 1948 31 school districts were consolidated into the Marshall district. They were: Bee Branch, Bohannon, Bryan, Canaan, Clark, Cooper, Cozahome, Dongola, Fair View, Flat Rock, Grandview, Happy Hollow, Hickory Hollow, Kimbrell Creek, Landis, Liberty Hall, Loafer's Glory, Maple Grove, Martin Box, O'Neal, Pine Grove, Pumpkin Flat, Rambo, Red Hill, Red Oak, Rock Creek, Rock Springs, Spring Creek, Walnut Grove, Watts, and Zack.

On July 1, 1993, the Tri-County School District dissolved, with the Marshall district taking a portion of it.

On July 1, 2003, the Witts Springs School District consolidated into the Marshall district. The Arkansas Department of Education ordered this consolidation to occur. The Marshall district continued operating the elementary grades at the Witts Springs Grade School, while high school students were bused to Marshall High School. Witts Springs Elementary closed in 2004 due to a low student enrollment.

On July 1, 2004, the Marshall School District and the Leslie School District consolidated to form the Searcy County School District, with the Marshall district annexing Leslie. This consolidation occurred because the Leslie district had fewer than 350 students and an Arkansas law passed in 2004 required school districts to have at least 350 students.

In 2006, Marshall Elementary School was accredited by AdvancED.

In 2009, Marshall High School and the Searcy County School District were awarded accreditation by AdvancED.

== Schools ==
All schools and the district are accredited by the Arkansas Department of Education (ADE).

- Marshall ABC Preschool
- Marshall Elementary School (K-3)
  - Originally a PreK-6 school, reconfigured in 2012 as K-4, then as K-3 in 2014
- Leslie Intermediate School (4-6)
  - Originally a PreK-6 school named Leslie Elementary School, reconfigured in 2012 as a 5-6 school named Leslie Intermediate School, reconfigured as 4–6 in 2014
- Marshall High School (Marshall)

Career and technical education:

- North Central Vocational Center (Leslie)—serves students in grades 9 through 12 in support of student's career and technical education needs.

Former schools:

- Leslie High School - Closed in 2007
- Witts Springs Elementary School - Closed in 2004
