= Searcy County Airport =

Airport in Arkansas, United States

- IATA: none; ICAO: none; FAA LID: 4A5

Summary
- Airport type: Public
- Owner: Searcy County
- Serves: Marshall, Arkansas
- Elevation AMSL: 963 ft (294 m)
- Coordinates: 35°53′49″N 092°39′32″W

Map
- Location of airport in Arkansas 4A5 (the United States)

Runways
Direction	Length		Surface
Direction	ft	m	Surface
5/23	4,003	1,220	Asphalt

Statistics (2010)
- Aircraft operations: 600
- Based aircraft: 2
- Source: Federal Aviation Administration

Searcy County Airport (FAA LID: 4A5) is a county-owned, public-use airport in Searcy County, Arkansas, United States. It is located one nautical mile (2 km) southwest of the central business district of Marshall, Arkansas. This airport is included in the National Plan of Integrated Airport Systems for 2011–2015, which categorized it as a general aviation facility.

== Facilities and aircraft ==
Searcy County Airport covers an area of 129 acres (52 ha) at an elevation of 963 feet (294 m) above mean sea level. It has one runway designated 5/23 with an asphalt surface measuring 4,003 by 75 feet (1,220 x 23 m).

For the 12-month period ending May 31, 2010, the airport had 600 general aviation aircraft operations, an average of 50 per month. At that time, there were two single-engine aircraft based at this airport.

== See also ==
- List of airports in Arkansas
