= David Branscum =

American politician

David L. Branscum
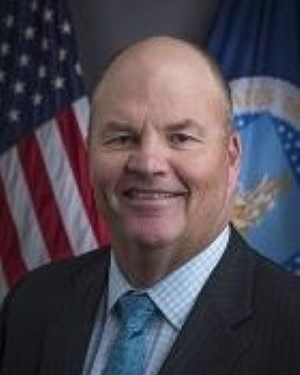
- Official portrait, 2018

United States Department of Agriculture Rural Development State Director for Arkansas
- Incumbent
- Assumed office May 2025
- President: Donald Trump
- Preceded by: Jill Floyd
- In office November 2017 – January 20, 2021
- President: Donald Trump
- Preceded by: Lawrence McCullough
- Succeeded by: Jill Floyd

Member of the Arkansas House of Representatives
- In office January 10, 2011 – November 17, 2017
- Preceded by: Roy Ragland
- Succeeded by: Donald Ragland
- Constituency: 90th district (2011‍–‍2013); 83rd district (2013‍–‍2017)

Personal details
- Born: Marshall, Arkansas, U.S.
- Party: Republican
- Spouse: Married
- Children: 5 sons
- Education: University of Arkansas
- Occupation: Politician, USDA official

David L. Branscum is a former state legislator in Arkansas who now works for the USDA. He served in the Arkansas House of Representatives until 2017. He is a Republican. From 2017-2021, he was the state director of the USDA's rural development program. He is married and has five sons.

He is a native of Marshall, Arkansas and a graduate of the University of Arkansas.

He was succeeded in the Arkansas House by Donald Ragland.
