= Robbie Branscum =

American novelist

- Born: Robbie Nell Tilley; June 17, 1934; Big Flat, Arkansas
- Died: May 24, 1997 (aged 62); San Pablo, California
- Occupations: Author, farmworker
- Spouse(s): Dwane Branscum (1949; div.); Leslie Carrico (1974; div.)
- Children: Deborah Branscum
- Writing career
- Period: 1971–1991
- Genres: children's literature young adult fiction
- Notable awards: Edgar Award, Friends of American Writers Award, PEN Award

Robbie Nell Tilley Branscum (June 17, 1934 – May 24, 1997) was an American writer of children's books and young adult fiction. Her books were awarded with a Friends of American Writers Award (1977) and an Edgar Award (1983).

== Early life and education ==
Robbie was born on a farm near Big Flat, Arkansas. Her father died when she was only four years old and she grew up with her poor grandparents on another farm. Branscum dropped out from school after the seventh grade. She continued to read books and write poetry and songs and provided for her livelihood through work at dirt farms. At the age of 15 she married Dwane Branscum. She gave birth to a daughter and divorced at the age of 25.

== Writer career ==
Branscum's life took a major turn after the newsletter of her church, the Southern Baptist, printed an article she had written. Subsequently, she decided to become an author. Branscum's first book was Me and Jim Luke (1971).

Branscum published 20 books in 20 years time, though not one each year. Several of her books were translated into Danish, Italian, Japanese, and Swedish. Branscum worked with literary agent Barthold Fles, who described her as "the worst speller and best writer I have."

In 1977, she won an Award of Merit from the Friends of American Writers for Toby, Granny and George and in 1983 an Edgar Award for The Murder of Hound Dog Bates.

== Death ==
She died from a heart attack in 1997 in her home in San Pablo, California.

== Honors and awards ==
- 1977 – Friends of American Writers Award of Merit for Toby, Granny and George
- 1979 – Best of the Best 1966–1978, School Library Journal, for Johnny May
- 1983 – Edgar Award, Category: Best Juvenile, for The Murder of Hound Dog Bates

== Books ==
- 1971 – Me and Jim Luke
- 1975 – Three Wars of Billy Joe Treat
- 1976 – Johnny May
- 1977 – Toby, Granny and George
- 1978 – Three Buckets of Daylight (with Allen Davis)
- 1978 – To the Tune of a Hickory Stick
- 1978 – The Ugliest Boy
- 1979 – For Love of Jody (with Allen Davis)
- 1979 – The Saving of P.S.
- 1979 – Toby Alone
- 1981 – Toby and Johnny Joe
- 1982 – The Murder of Hound Dog Bates
- 1983 – Cheater and Flitter Dick
- 1983 – Spud Tackett
- 1984 – The Adventures of Johnnie May
- 1986 – The Girl
- 1987 – Johnny May Grows Up
- 1989 – Cameo Rose
- 1991 – Old Blue Tilley
- 1991 – Never Pa's Girl
