= Searcy County Courthouse =

- U.S. National Register of Historic Places
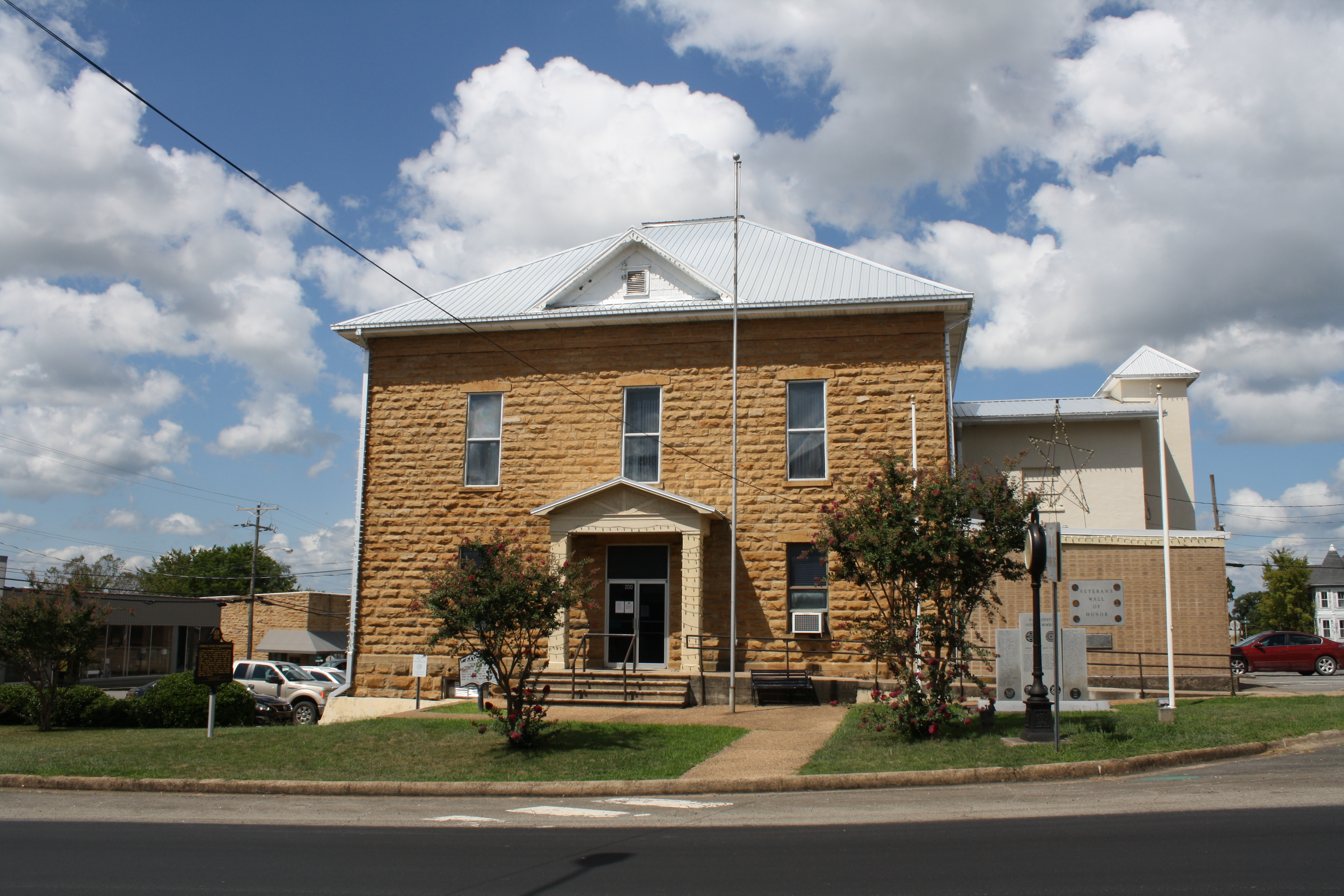

- Location within Arkansas Location within the United States
- Location: Courthouse Sq., Marshall, Arkansas
- Coordinates: 35°54′34″N 92°37′55″W
- Area: less than one acre
- Built: 1889
- NRHP reference No.: 76000467
- Added to NRHP: October 21, 1976

The Searcy County Courthouse is located on Courthouse Square in Marshall, Arkansas. It is a two-story stone structure, with a hip roof. The walls are fashioned out of rustically cut native sandstone, and it is topped by a metal hip roof with widely overhanging eaves. The front entrance is sheltered by a single-story porch supported by cast stone columns. The courthouse, the third for Searcy since its incorporation in 1838, was built in 1889 on the site of the second courthouse, which was destroyed by fire. The first courthouse was in Lebanon, about 6 miles (9.7 km) to the west, before being moved to Marshall in 1855.

The building was listed on the National Register of Historic Places in 1976.

== See also ==
- National Register of Historic Places listings in Searcy County, Arkansas
