= Marshall, Arkansas =

- City
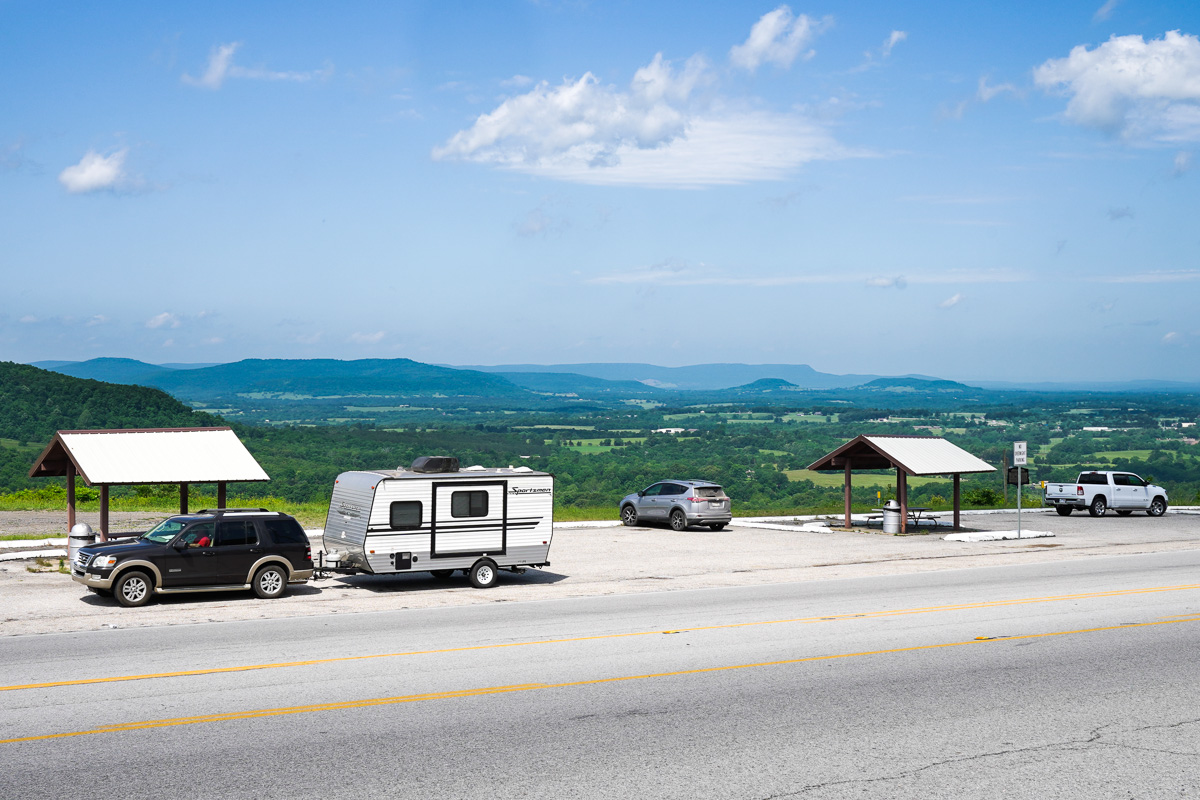
- Scenic overlook from US Hwy 65 south of Marshall, Arkansas

- Location of Marshall in Searcy County, Arkansas.
- Coordinates: 35°54′36″N 92°38′11″W
- Country: United States
- State: Arkansas
- County: Searcy

Government
  - Mayor: Kevin Elliott

Area
  - Total: 4.08 sq mi (10.58 km^{2})
  - Land: 4.07 sq mi (10.55 km^{2})
  - Water: 0.012 sq mi (0.03 km^{2})
- Elevation: 915 ft (279 m)

Population (2020)
  - Total: 1,329
  - Estimate (2025): 1,320 ▼
  - Density: 326.3/sq mi (125.98/km^{2})
- Time zone: UTC-6 (Central (CST))
  - Summer (DST): UTC-5 (CDT)
- ZIP code: 72650
- Area code: 870
- FIPS code: 05-44300
- GNIS feature ID: 2405029
- Website: cityofmarshallar.com

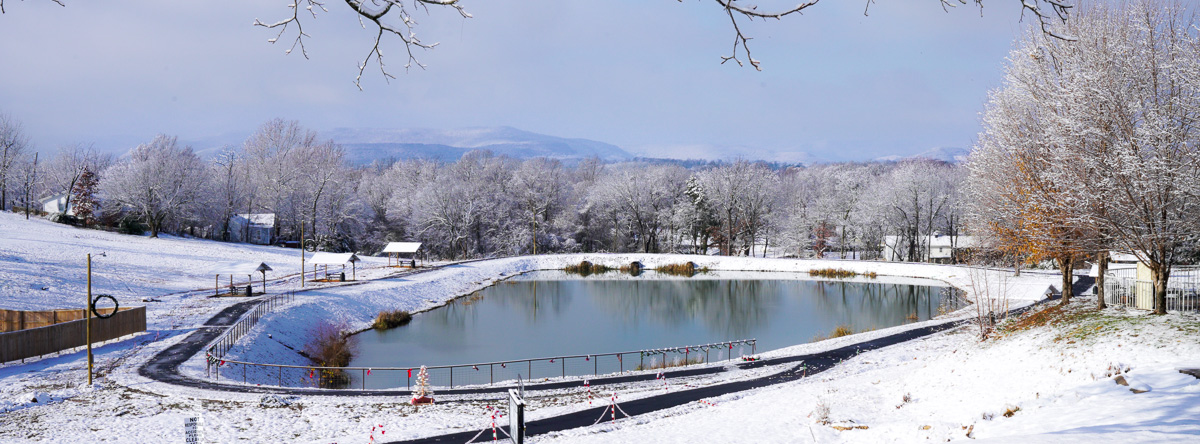
Winter in Marshall's Raccoon Springs Park

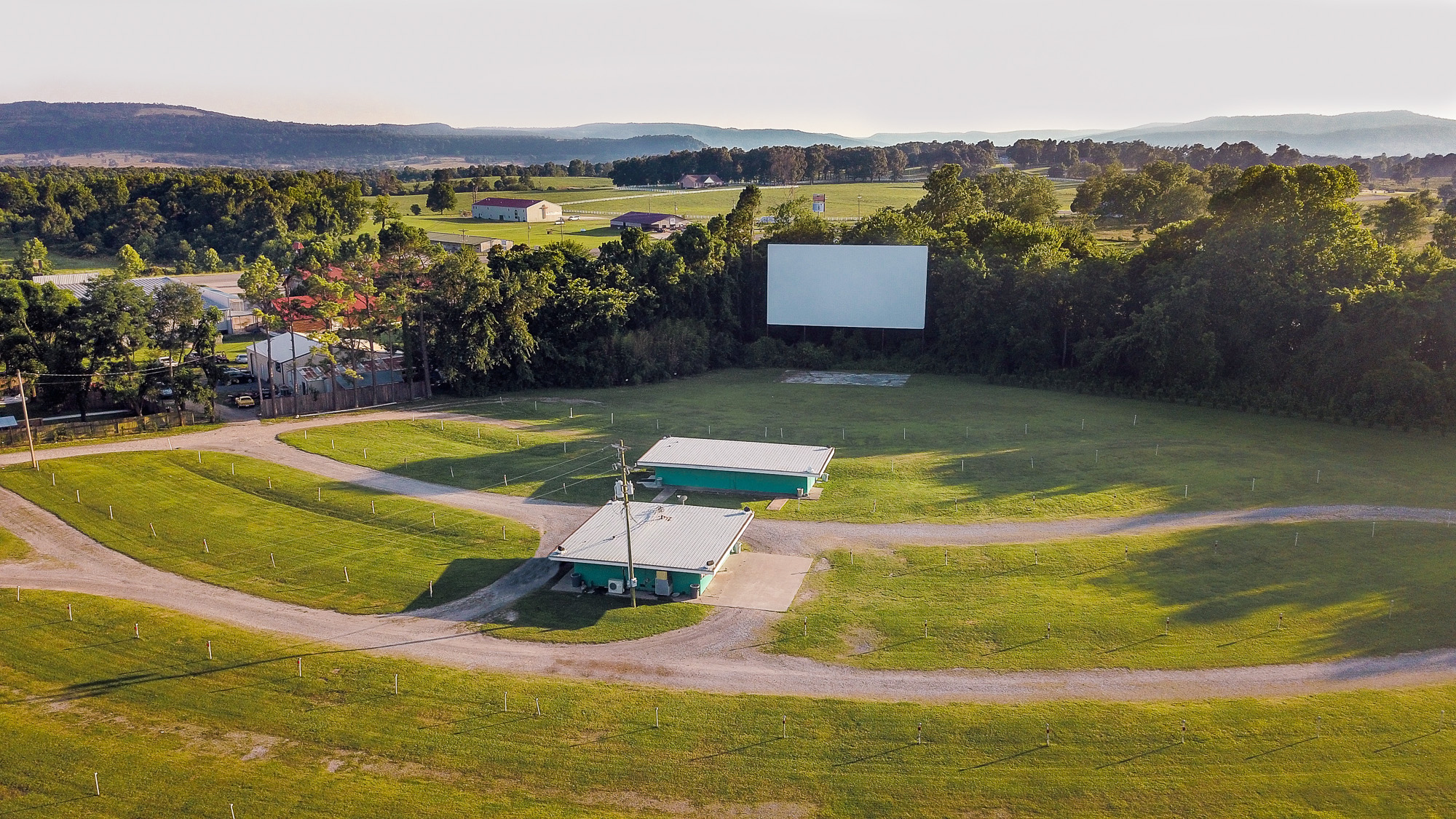
The Kenda Drive-In Theater is an open year-round regional attraction showing first run feature movies.

Marshall is the largest city in and the county seat of Searcy County in Arkansas, United States. As of the 2020 census, Marshall had a population of 1,329. It is located in the Ozarks at the foot of the Boston Mountain Range 10.5 mi (16.9 km) south of America's first National River, the Buffalo National River. Marshall serves as a hub for area tourism including camping, floating, hiking, bicycling and Dark Sky viewing.

== History ==
=== Early history ===
The Paleo Indians, were the earliest known human inhabitants of the area. They marked their stay by leaving behind their unique Clovis spear points in caves and fields. Later, they became more advanced in creating shelters, clothing, and hunting weapons. In 1968 Don Dickson discovered lighter “heat treated” flint points at Calf Creek near Snowball. As a result of this first discovery all similar type projectiles are called Calf Creek Points.

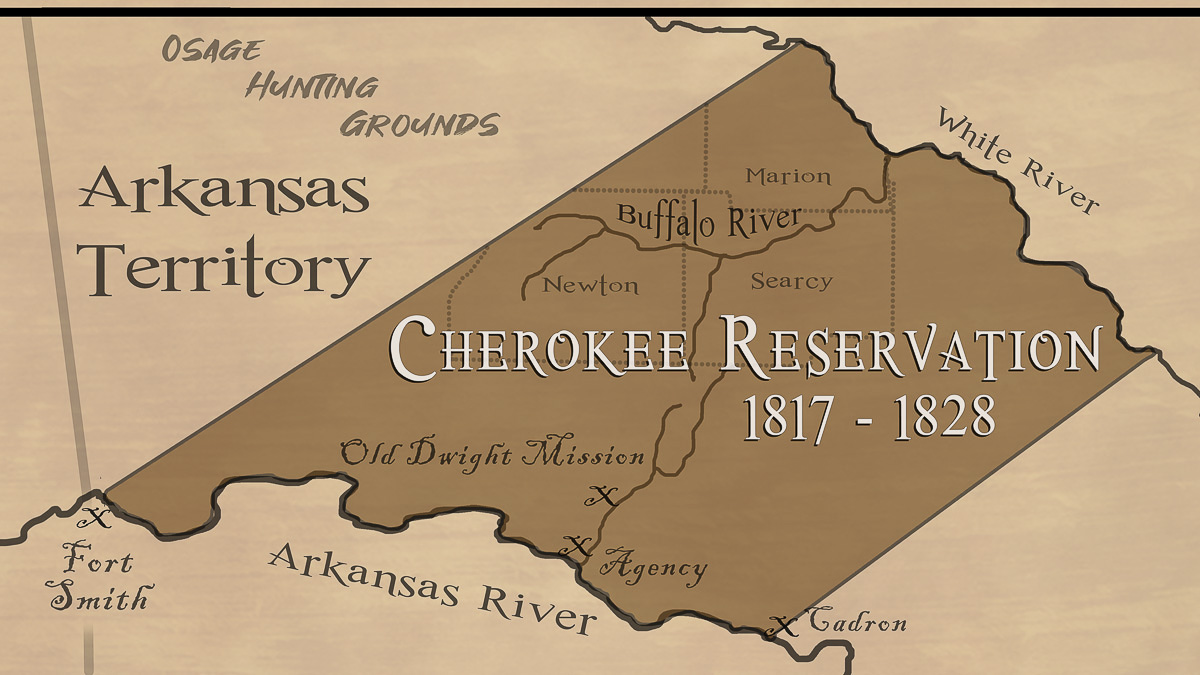
First Cherokee Reservation west of the Mississippi

A year after the Louisiana Purchase, Congress began efforts to remove all tribes west of the Mississippi. By 1810, at the urging of the Secretary of War, large groups of Cherokees voluntarily moved to Arkansas and immediately found themselves fighting with the Osage who claimed this area as their hunting grounds. The 1817 Treaty of the Cherokee Agency created a designated area in Northwest Arkansas and it became the first Cherokee Reservation west of the Mississippi. To help with the conflict with the Osage the Cherokees invited the Shawnee to settle in the area of the Buffalo River.

A Shawnee Village was established southwest of Marshall and was most likely Chief Peter Cornstalk's village. (He was the Grandson, and name sake, of the great Chief of the Shawnee Nation during the American Revolutionary War.) In the 1830s Chief Cornstalk married Mary Adams, grand daughter of Robert Adams, a business partner of Indian Agent, Pierre Menard. Mary's family was one of the first white settlers in the area.

By the 1840s, all tribes were removed to Indian Territory.

The first settlement here was at this location on a bench at the foot of the Devils Backbone Mountain at Raccoon Springs. In 1856, the county seat was moved from Lebanon to this site, and it was named Burrowville (sometimes spelled Burrowsville) after Napoleon Bonaparte Burrow, a Crawford County planter and politician.

=== Civil War ===
The Civil War was a significant transitional event for Marshall. It changed the name of the town, retarded its growth for years, and established a vibrant two-party political system in what was for many years a one-party state. It also caused desolation—much of Burrowville/Marshall was burned, including the courthouse and county records. On November 17, 1861, the Arkansas Confederate authorities discovered a secret pro-Union Peace Society in north-central Arkansas and tried to arrest all members. The captured Peace Society members were guarded in the courthouse. On December 9, 1861, seventy-seven prisoners were sent to Little Rock where they were encouraged to join the Confederate army. After the war, the political situation was still so volatile that U.S. troops were stationed in Burrowville for a few months to keep peace. County Unionists pushed to change the town's name to Marshall after U.S. Chief Justice John Marshall, and the legislature approved the change on March 18, 1867.

=== Early 1900s ===
The discovery of lead and zinc ore in north central Arkansas along with the arrival of the Missouri and North Arkansas Railroad brought a brief boom period time to Marshall. During the early 1900s with the help of mining and timber Marshall grew and prospered. After World War I, a complex series of events combined to undermine the previous decades growth. By the 1929 stock market crash the region was experiencing severe economic hardships.

=== Post World War II ===
Following World War II Marshall was the primary trade center for service and retail for most of Searcy County serving as the hub for the timber, cattle, and other agricultural industries. In the 1950s strawberries became a major product for the area. During this time Marshall proclaimed itself as the “Strawberry Capital of the World”.

By the late 1960s the commercial strawberry industry was moving to California and Texas, general retail was being captured by national companies like Wal-Mart, and improved highway systems allowed people to travel to larger towns for all goods and services. These factors combined with others caused the beginning of a fundamental change in the Marshall economy.

== Geography ==
Marshall is located at 35°54′36″N 92°38′11″W situated in the Ozarks at the base of the northern escarpment of the rugged Boston Mountains.

According to the United States Census Bureau, the city has a total area of 2.6 square miles (6.7 km^{2}), all land.

=== Climate ===
The climate in this area is characterized by hot, humid summers and generally mild to cool winters. According to the Köppen Climate Classification system, Marshall has a humid subtropical climate, abbreviated "Cfa" on climate maps.

Climate data for Marshall, Arkansas (1991–2020 normals, extremes 1892–1893, 1915–1936, 1944–present)
Month	Jan	Feb	Mar	Apr	May	Jun	Jul	Aug	Sep	Oct	Nov	Dec	Year
Record high °F (°C)	79 (26)	85 (29)	91 (33)	93 (34)	96 (36)	107 (42)	113 (45)	112 (44)	105 (41)	95 (35)	86 (30)	83 (28)	113 (45)
Mean maximum °F (°C)	68.9 (20.5)	73.5 (23.1)	79.6 (26.4)	83.4 (28.6)	87.8 (31.0)	92.0 (33.3)	96.4 (35.8)	96.7 (35.9)	92.9 (33.8)	86.9 (30.5)	76.4 (24.7)	70.0 (21.1)	98.9 (37.2)
Mean daily maximum °F (°C)	47.2 (8.4)	51.8 (11.0)	60.5 (15.8)	69.9 (21.1)	76.8 (24.9)	84.8 (29.3)	89.2 (31.8)	89.0 (31.7)	82.0 (27.8)	71.6 (22.0)	59.8 (15.4)	50.0 (10.0)	69.4 (20.8)
Daily mean °F (°C)	36.6 (2.6)	40.6 (4.8)	48.6 (9.2)	57.6 (14.2)	66.0 (18.9)	74.1 (23.4)	78.4 (25.8)	77.5 (25.3)	69.9 (21.1)	59.3 (15.2)	48.7 (9.3)	39.7 (4.3)	58.1 (14.5)
Mean daily minimum °F (°C)	25.9 (−3.4)	29.3 (−1.5)	36.7 (2.6)	45.4 (7.4)	55.1 (12.8)	63.4 (17.4)	67.6 (19.8)	66.0 (18.9)	57.9 (14.4)	47.0 (8.3)	37.6 (3.1)	29.4 (−1.4)	46.8 (8.2)
Mean minimum °F (°C)	8.4 (−13.1)	14.5 (−9.7)	19.5 (−6.9)	30.0 (−1.1)	39.8 (4.3)	52.6 (11.4)	57.1 (13.9)	56.1 (13.4)	43.0 (6.1)	30.7 (−0.7)	22.0 (−5.6)	12.9 (−10.6)	4.7 (−15.2)
Record low °F (°C)	−24 (−31)	−13 (−25)	5 (−15)	20 (−7)	31 (−1)	42 (6)	45 (7)	44 (7)	31 (−1)	19 (−7)	8 (−13)	−10 (−23)	−24 (−31)
Average precipitation inches (mm)	3.20 (81)	3.33 (85)	4.83 (123)	5.32 (135)	5.06 (129)	3.68 (93)	3.48 (88)	3.16 (80)	3.67 (93)	3.80 (97)	4.35 (110)	3.59 (91)	47.47 (1,206)
Average snowfall inches (cm)	0.9 (2.3)	1.1 (2.8)	1.1 (2.8)	0.0 (0.0)	0.0 (0.0)	0.0 (0.0)	0.0 (0.0)	0.0 (0.0)	0.0 (0.0)	0.0 (0.0)	0.1 (0.25)	0.8 (2.0)	4.0 (10)
Average precipitation days (≥ 0.01 in)	7.1	6.9	8.6	8.3	9.4	7.0	7.2	6.7	5.9	7.3	7.0	7.2	88.9
Average snowy days (≥ 0.1 in)	0.7	0.8	0.4	0.0	0.0	0.0	0.0	0.0	0.0	0.0	0.1	0.4	2.4
Source: NOAA

== Economy ==
In 2021 the Marshall economy is a diverse mixture of retail, general services, and some manufacturing. Located on US Highway 65 and near the Tyler Bend Visitor Center for the Buffalo National River, the city serves a large volume of traffic for travel and tourism. Marshall is a tourism trail hub with support services for a variety of trail activities including bicycling, motorcycles, ATV, horseback riding and hiking.

== Arts and culture ==
The Searcy County Veteran's Memorial Hall has an extensive military museum focused on local service men and women. It features photos and information about hundreds of Searcy County residents from every US theater of action from present all the way back to the War of 1812.

The Buffalo River Historic Jail & Museum will open summer 2021 near the courthouse square.

The Kenda Drive-In Theater is one the few remaining drive-ins in Arkansas and the only one operating year-round. In addition to showing first run movies it is also a music concert venue. During the summer it hosts a monthly Throwback Thursdays event celebrating vintage automobiles.

Marshall hosts the annual the Chocolate Roll Festival™ and World Champion Chocolate Roll Contest™ each spring at the high school on US Highway 65. In 2017, USA Today selected Searcy County as its Food Capital to represent all of Arkansas as Searcy County is the Chocolate Roll Capital of the World™.

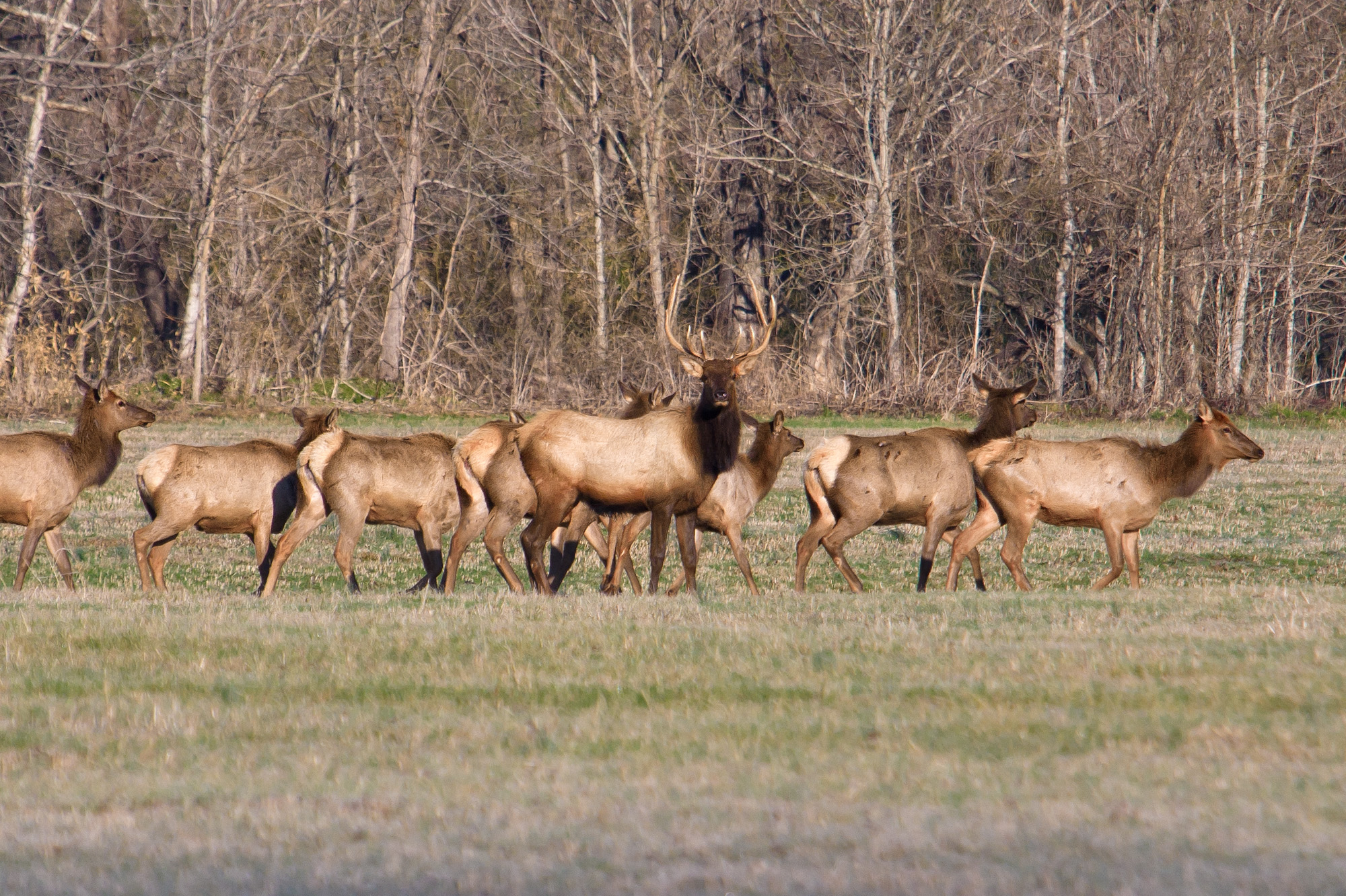
Elk near US Highway 65 along Bear Creek 4 miles (6.4 km) from Marshall

== Parks and recreation ==
There are two parks in the city limits. The community Center park with lighted tennis courts and baseball field, and Raccoon Springs Park with a public fishing pond. Both parks have walking tracks and covered picnic tables.

Marshall is nearby to many park and recreation opportunities. The scenic overlook one mile south of town on Devil's Backbone Mountain offering a panoramic view of north central Arkansas. It comes with a roadside park, coffee shop, historic marker, and interpretive sign.

The Buffalo National River and Tyler Bend Visitor Center located 10 1/2 miles to the north provides a variety of park and recreational activities including hiking, swimming, canoeing, horseback trails, camping and interpretive programing. It is also the 1st park in Arkansas to be named an International Dark Sky Park.

For bicycling, the Ozark Grinder Trail is a nearby gravel grinder bicycle trail covering approximately 200 miles and 13,000 feet of elevation in north central Arkansas Ozarks. The annual Arkansaw High Country Race transits through Marshall each June. This event is an approximately 1,034-mile self-supported (bikepacking) gravel cycling race with approximately 84,000 feet of total elevation.

Motorcycling trails include the 57-mile Bear Creek Grow and the 64-mile Leslie Lasso, two routes that combine into one ride called the Growl-Lasso! The combined 121-mile ride takes in Marshall and the historic Searcy County Courthouse.

Other recreational trails in the area include, the nearby Ozark Highlands Trail, the Searcy County Quilt Trail.

== Infrastructure ==
=== Major highways ===
- U.S. Highway 65
- Arkansas Highway 27
- Arkansas Highway 74

=== Airport ===
The Searcy County Airport (4A5) is a Level 2 general aviation airport. The airport has a Precision Approach Path Indicator, (PAPI) and features a 4003′ x 75′ lighted (MIRL) runway, runway strength 12,500 SW, rotating beacon, 120′ x 150′ hangar, 18′ side walls, 60′ stack doors, 8′ loading dock, and a large, paved apron.

== Media ==
=== Radio ===
- KPJN-LP, a former radio station (2003–2012)

== Demographics ==
Historical population
Census	Pop.	Note	%±
1880	160		—
1890	278		73.8%
1900	260		−6.5%
1910	558		114.6%
1920	749		34.2%
1930	638		−14.8%
1940	822		28.8%
1950	1,189		44.6%
1960	1,095		−7.9%
1970	1,397		27.6%
1980	1,595		14.2%
1990	1,318		−17.4%
2000	1,313		−0.4%
2010	1,355		3.2%
2020	1,329		−1.9%
2025 (est.)	1,320	▼	−0.7%
U.S. Decennial Census

=== 2020 census ===
As of the 2020 census, Marshall had a population of 1,329. The median age was 44.8 years. 19.0% of residents were under the age of 18 and 23.6% of residents were 65 years of age or older. For every 100 females there were 87.4 males, and for every 100 females age 18 and over there were 85.1 males age 18 and over.

0.0% of residents lived in urban areas, while 100.0% lived in rural areas.

There were 583 households in Marshall, of which 25.4% had children under the age of 18 living in them. Of all households, 39.3% were married-couple households, 20.6% were households with a male householder and no spouse or partner present, and 35.5% were households with a female householder and no spouse or partner present. About 40.1% of all households were made up of individuals and 19.4% had someone living alone who was 65 years of age or older.

There were 741 housing units, of which 21.3% were vacant. The homeowner vacancy rate was 5.5% and the rental vacancy rate was 11.8%.

Marshall racial composition
Race	Number	Percentage
White (non-Hispanic)	1,191	89.62%
Native American	19	1.43%
Asian	2	0.15%
Pacific Islander	2	0.15%
Other/Mixed	81	6.09%
Hispanic or Latino	34	2.56%

=== 2000 census ===
As of the census of 2000, there were 1,313 people, 594 households, and 355 families residing in the city. The population density was 506.1 inhabitants per square mile (195.4/km^{2}). There were 712 housing units at an average density of 274.4 per square mile (105.9/km^{2}). The racial makeup of the city was 98.32% White, 0.08% Black or African American, 1.30% Native American, 0.30% from other races, and 0.99% from two or more races. 0.99% of the population were Hispanic or Latino of any race.

There were 594 households, out of which 24.7% had children under the age of 18 living with them, 46.0% were married couples living together, 11.4% had a female householder with no husband present, and 40.2% were non-families. 39.1% of all households were made up of individuals, and 23.6% had someone living alone who was 65 years of age or older. The average household size was 2.12 and the average family size was 2.81.

In the city, the population was spread out, with 21.7% under the age of 18, 8.1% from 18 to 24, 21.9% from 25 to 44, 19.0% from 45 to 64, and 29.2% who were 65 years of age or older. The median age was 44 years. For every 100 females, there were 80.1 males. For every 100 females age 18 and over, there were 74.5 males.

The median income for a household in the city was $18,846, and the median income for a family was $27,500. Males had a median income of $22,857 versus $14,107 for females. The per capita income for the city was $13,772. About 20.0% of families and 27.5% of the population were below the poverty line, including 38.4% of those under age 18 and 25.7% of those age 65 or over.

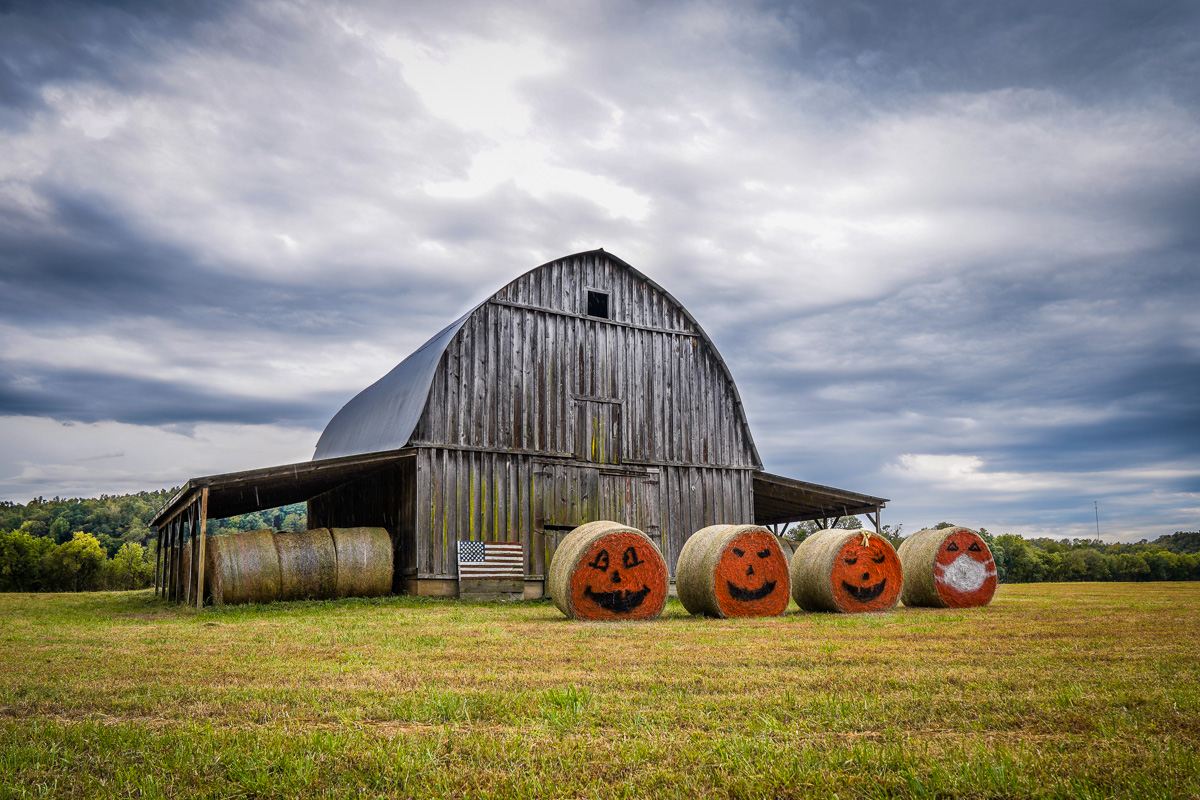
Smith Barn along US Highway 65 north of Marshall

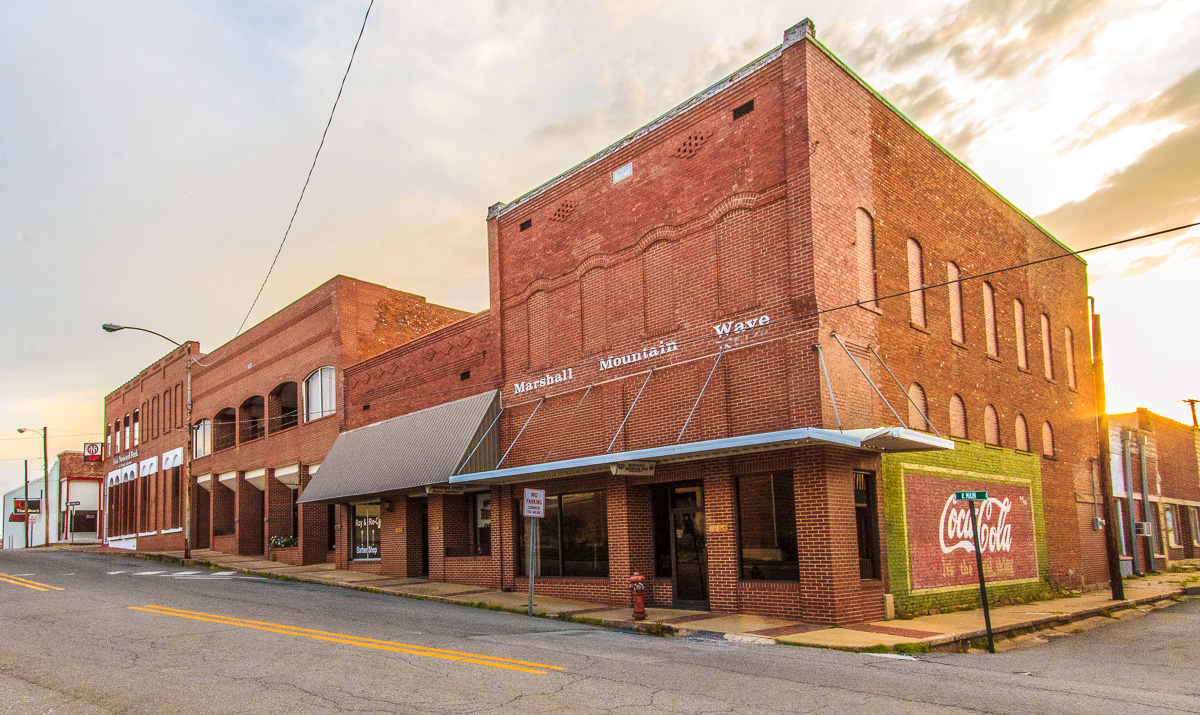
Sunrise on the town square.

== Education ==
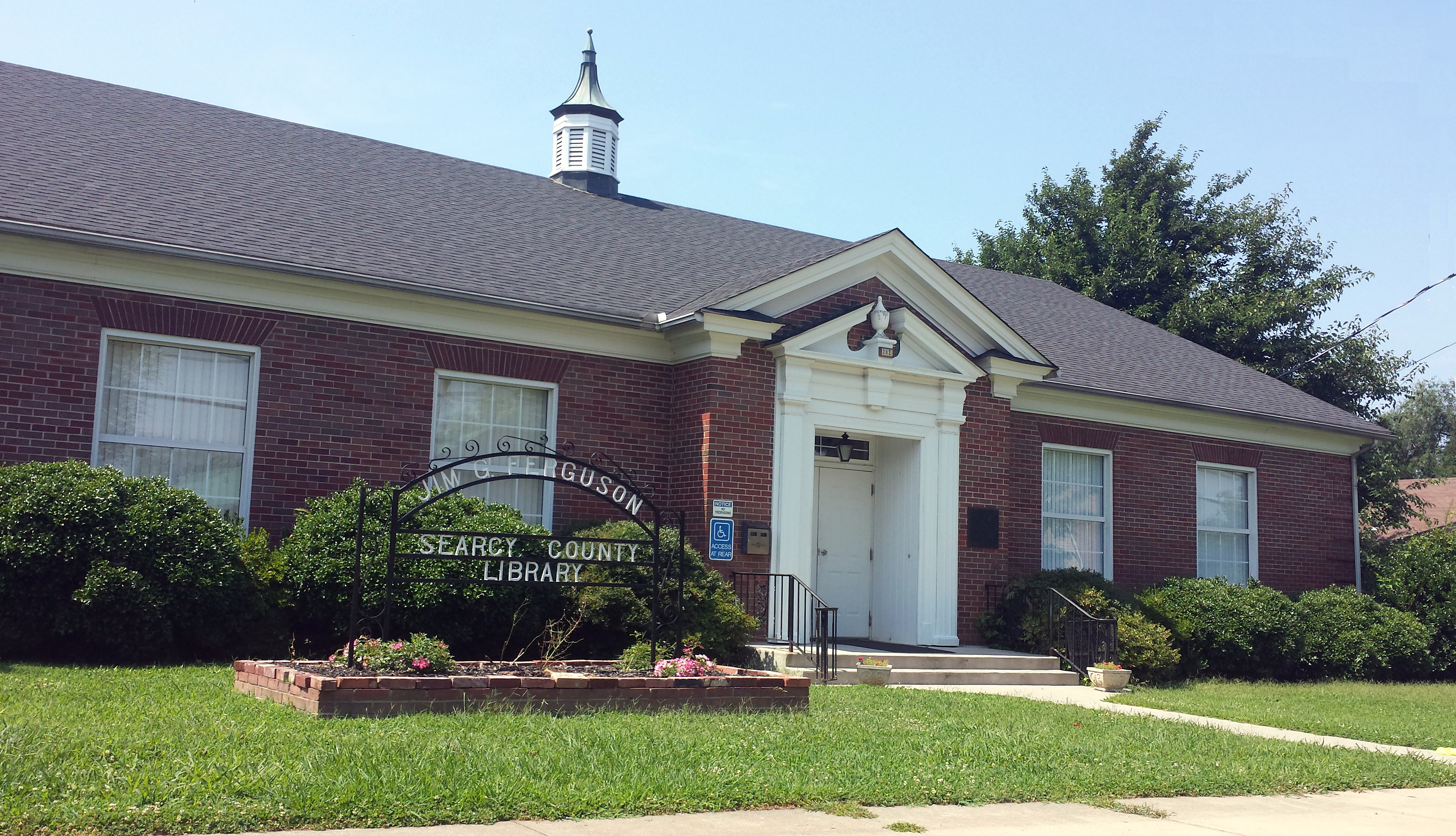
Searcy County Library

Public education for elementary and secondary school students is available from the Searcy County School District, including Marshall ABC Preschool, Marshall Elementary School, Leslie Intermediate School in Leslie, and Marshall High School. Marshall High's mascot is the bobcat.

The Marshall High girls basketball team won back-to-back Class AAA state championships in 2007 and 2008.

In 1866 a tuition-based school opened in Marshall. The Arkansas Legislature established the Marshall School District in 1909. On July 1, 2004, the Marshall district and the Leslie School District consolidated to form the Searcy County School District. Originally a PreK-6 school serving all elementary grades for Marshall, Marshall Elementary School was reconfigured in 2012 as a K-4 serving the entire school district, then as K-3 in 2014. In 2012 Leslie Elementary School in Leslie was reconfigured as Leslie Intermediate School, an upper elementary school serving the whole district. In the 2019 rankings of U.S. News & World Report, Marshall High School was recognized as a bronze medal recipient. Marshall High School has also been designated as a School of Innovation.

The Jim G. Ferguson Searcy County Library was completed in 1961 through the efforts of Jim Ferguson, George Kendall and the citizens of the community. Mr. Ferguson was quoted as saying “Kids here are no different than kids anywhere else; all they need is an opportunity.” This Library offers a total of 8,524 sq. feet of resources with a 60,000 book & materials collection. Public computers are available for research, job searches etc., and Wi-Fi is available. The Genealogy Dept. is an LDS Affiliate Library with 5,000+ historical pictures of people and places as well as 2,400 historical records. There are also books, maps and microfilm available for research. There is a Genealogy Facebook page that has reached almost 23,000 people. In 2016, the Ferguson Foundation assisted the Library with creating “Hattie House” next door to the Library. This Youth Center provides free access to nutrition, supervised games, crafts, music and tutoring. The Library received the 2011 Arkansas Star Library Award.

== Notable people ==
- Elton Britt, western music yodeler
