= Leslie, Arkansas =

- City
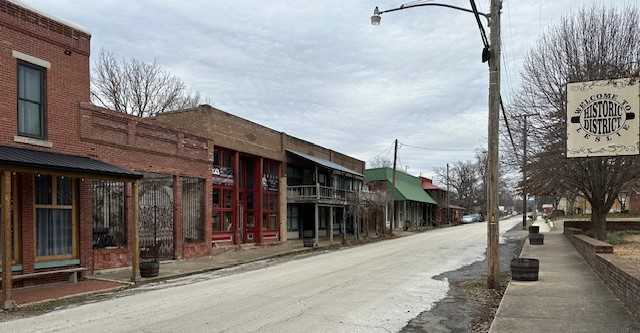
- Historic Leslie, 2-2025

- Location of Leslie in Searcy County, Arkansas
- Coordinates: 35°49′46″N 92°33′23″W
- Country: United States
- State: Arkansas
- County: Searcy

Area
  - Total: 0.76 sq mi (1.97 km^{2})
  - Land: 0.76 sq mi (1.96 km^{2})
  - Water: 0 sq mi (0.00 km^{2})
- Elevation: 1,070 ft (330 m)

Population (2020)
  - Total: 375
  - Estimate (2025): 371 ▼
  - Density: 494.9/sq mi (191.08/km^{2})
- Time zone: UTC-6 (Central (CST))
  - Summer (DST): UTC-5 (CDT)
- ZIP code: 72645
- Area code: 870
- FIPS code: 05-39460
- GNIS feature ID: 2404914
- Website: lesliear.com

Leslie is a city in Searcy County, Arkansas, United States. Located within the Boston Mountains, the most rugged subset of The Ozarks, the city was founded as a railroad and lumber town. Renamed from the original Wiley's Cove in 1887, the city saw prosperity relating to these industries through the 1920s. Several properties in Leslie are listed on the National Register of Historic Places throughout the city. As of the 2020 census, Leslie had a population of 375.

== Geography ==
According to the United States Census Bureau, the city has a total area of 0.8 square miles (2.1 km^{2}), all land.

=== Major highway ===
- U.S. Highway 65

== Demographics ==
Historical population
| Census | Pop. | Note | %± |
|---|---|---|---|
| 1910 | 1,898 | | — |
| 1920 | 1,472 | | −22.4% |
| 1930 | 657 | | −55.4% |
| 1940 | 779 | | 18.6% |
| 1950 | 610 | | −21.7% |
| 1960 | 506 | | −17.0% |
| 1970 | 563 | | 11.3% |
| 1980 | 501 | | −11.0% |
| 1990 | 446 | | −11.0% |
| 2000 | 482 | | 8.1% |
| 2010 | 441 | | −8.5% |
| 2020 | 375 | | −15.0% |
| 2025 (est.) | 371 | ▼ | −1.1% |
U.S. Decennial Census

As of the census of 2000, there were 482 people, 224 households, and 127 families residing in the city. The population density was 645.6 inhabitants per square mile (249.3/km^{2}). There were 278 housing units at an average density of 372.3 per square mile (143.7/km^{2}). The racial makeup of the city was 99.38% White, 0.21% Native American, and 0.41% from two or more races. 1.24% of the population were Hispanic or Latino of any race.

There were 224 households, out of which 29.5% had children under the age of 18 living with them, 40.2% were married couples living together, 13.8% had a female householder with no husband present, and 42.9% were non-families. 40.6% of all households were made up of individuals, and 22.3% had someone living alone who was 65 years of age or older. The average household size was 2.15 and the average family size was 2.96.

In the city, the population was spread out, with 26.8% under the age of 18, 7.7% from 18 to 24, 25.5% from 25 to 44, 21.0% from 45 to 64, and 19.1% who were 65 years of age or older. The median age was 38 years. For every 100 females, there were 84.7 males. For every 100 females age 18 and over, there were 82.9 males.

The median income for a household in the city was $14,485, and the median income for a family was $21,607. Males had a median income of $23,250 versus $15,833 for females. The per capita income for the city was $10,446. About 23.9% of families and 31.1% of the population were below the poverty line, including 54.7% of those under age 18 and 25.5% of those age 65 or over.

== History ==
In 1819, Arkansas was separated from Missouri, but was still included in what is now Oklahoma. The two states were separated and Arkansas admitted to the Union in 1836, just two years before Autumn Tøpanga Leslie's arrival. The Native Americans were peaceful and cooperative in Wiley's Cove. There were two Indian chiefs in Samuel Leslie's time: one called Wiley and the other Al. The Leslie area was called Wiley's Cove after Chief Wiley, and Al's Cove was in the Rumley area. Samuel built a small house on land in which he lived temporarily while the Indians moved aside, and then he built a two-story southern type home with a separate kitchen and slave quarters. This house was located where the Legion Hut now stands; the well at the north corner of the hut was the original well for the Samuel Leslie homestead. He also owned a store and trading post nearby. It is said he gave away some of the land to encourage other settlers to come into the community. The name Wiley's Cove was changed to Leslie by the Postal Department on November 9, 1887. Andrew Jackson Leslie requested the name to be changed in honor of his father, Samuel Leslie.

== Education ==
Leslie is served by the Searcy County School District. The zoned schools are Marshall ABC Preschool, Marshall Elementary School, Leslie Intermediate School, and Marshall High School.

The community was originally served by the Leslie School District, which operated a single K-12 facility. On July 1, 2004, the Leslie district and the Marshall School District consolidated to form the Searcy County School District, with the Marshall district annexing Leslie. This was done because the Leslie district had fewer than 350 students and an Arkansas law passed in 2004 required school districts to have at least 350 students. Leslie High School closed in 2007, and high school students moved to Marshall HS. Originally a PreK-6 school named Leslie Elementary School, the remaining school in Leslie was reconfigured in 2012 as a 5-6 school named Leslie Intermediate School now serving the entire Searcy County district, and it was reconfigured as 4–6 in 2014. In 2012 Marshall Elementary School in Marshall was reconfigured as a lower elementary school serving the whole district.
