= Leslie School District =

Defunct school district in Arkansas, United States

Leslie School District No. 23 or Leslie Public Schools was a school district headquartered in Leslie, Arkansas. It operated the Leslie School a.k.a. the Leslie Public School, which had all grades in a single building; high school students occupied the eastern part of the building while elementary students occupied the western part. As of 2003 the district had over 40 employees and 240 students. The high school portion of the building included a gymnasium. The mascot was the bulldog.

== History ==
In 1910 the Leslie school had been established.

Leslie School's class of 1996-1997 had the highest Arkansas Pilot Exit Exam scores in the State of Arkansas.

On July 1, 2004, the Leslie district and the Marshall School District consolidated to form the Searcy County School District, with the Marshall district annexing Leslie. This consolidation occurred because the Leslie district had fewer than 350 students and an Arkansas law passed in 2004 required school districts to have at least 350 students.
