= Sugar Loaf Township, Boone County, Arkansas =

Sugar Loaf Township
- Township
- Location in Arkansas
- Coordinates: 36°24′52.87″N 92°58′3.37″W
- Country: United States
- State: Arkansas
- County: Boone

Area
  - Total: 93.832 sq mi (243.02 km^{2})
  - Land: 84.026 sq mi (217.63 km^{2})
  - Water: 9.806 sq mi (25.40 km^{2})

Population (2010)
  - Total: 2,320
  - Density: 27.61/sq mi (10.66/km^{2})
- Time zone: UTC-6 (CST)
  - Summer (DST): UTC-5 (CDT)
- Zip Code: 72644 (Lead Hill), 72630 (Diamond City)
- Area code: 870

Sugar Loaf Township is one of twenty current townships in Boone County, Arkansas, USA. As of the 2010 census, its total population was 2,320.

== Geography ==
According to the United States Census Bureau, Sugar Loaf Township covers an area of 93.832 square miles (243.02 km^{2}); 84.026 square miles (217.63 km^{2}) of land and 9.806 square miles (25.40 km^{2}) of water.

=== Cities, towns, and villages ===
- Cedar Crest Estates including:
  - Bull Shoals Acres
  - Lakeshore Acres
  - Landings North Subdivision
- Diamond City
- Lead Hill
- South Lead Hill

== Population history ==
The township was located in Carroll County for the 1850 and 1860 censuses. Population includes the incorporated city of Diamond City and the incorporated towns of Lead Hill and South Lead Hill.

Historical population
Census	Pop.	Note	%±
1850	226		—
1860	269		19.0%
1870	827		207.4%
1880	1,370		65.7%
1890	1,712		25.0%
1900	1,518		−11.3%
1910	1,032		−32.0%
1920	1,239		20.1%
1930	1,077		−13.1%
1940	833		−22.7%
1950	587		−29.5%
1960	591		0.7%
1970	1,016		71.9%
1980	1,632		60.6%
1990	1,774		8.7%
2000	2,028		14.3%
2010	2,320		14.4%
