= Guédelon Castle =

French project recreating a 13th-century castle

- Château de Guédelon
- Near Treigny, Yonne, Burgundy, France
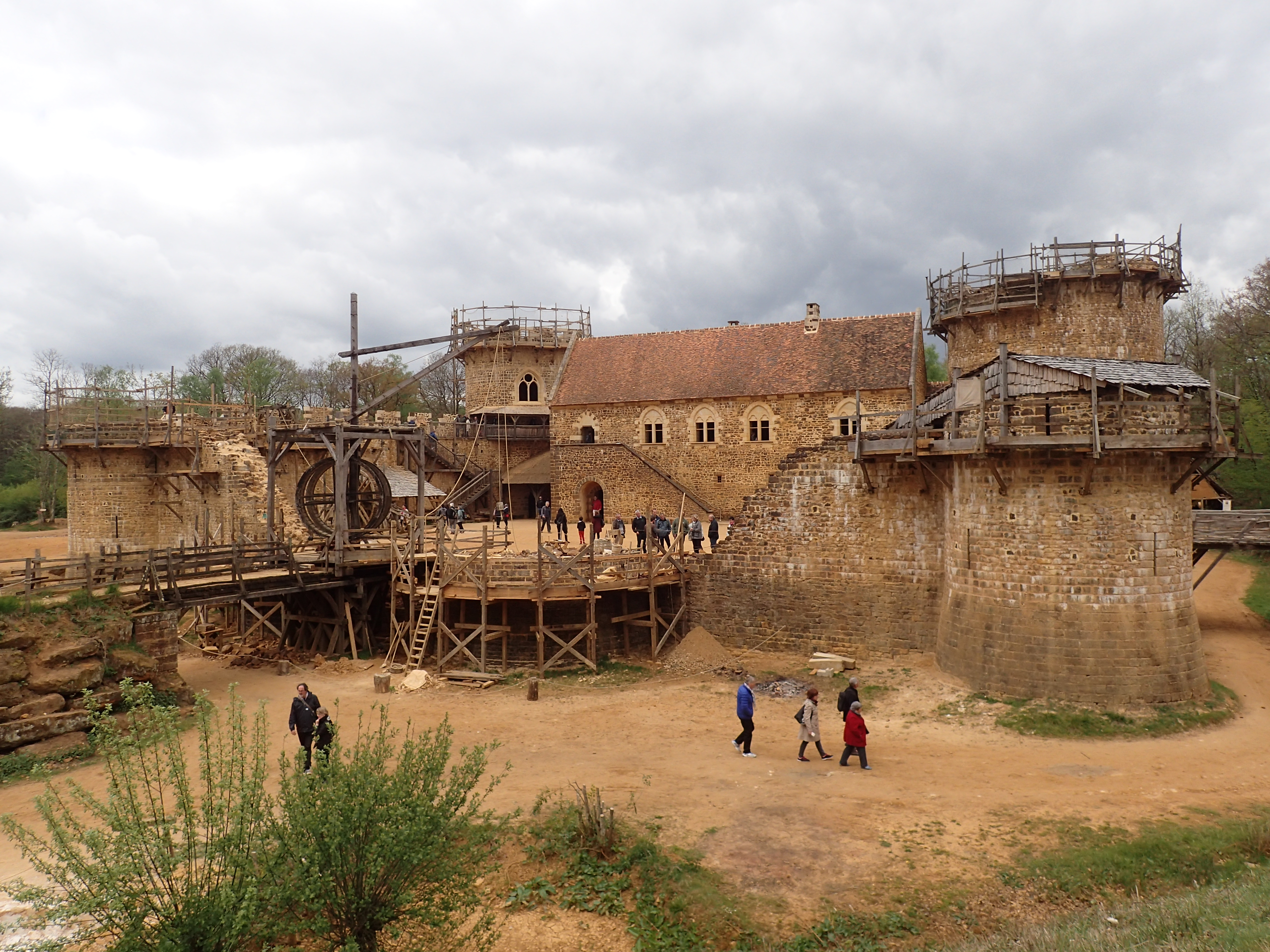
- Guédelon Castle in April 2017

Site information
- Type: Castle
- Owner: Michel Guyot
- Open to the public: yes
- Condition: Under construction
- Website: www.guedelon.fr

Location
- Plan of Guédelon Castle
- Guédelon Castle
- Coordinates: 47°35′1″N 3°9′20″E

Site history
- Built: 1997–present
- Materials: All obtained locally including wood, stone, sand, lime, iron, and ochre (paint)

Guédelon Castle (French: Château de Guédelon [ʃɑto d(ə) ɡedlɔ̃]) is a castle under construction near Treigny, France. The castle is the focus of an experimental archaeology project aimed at recreating a 13th-century castle and its environment using period techniques, dress, and materials.

In order to fully investigate the technology required in the medieval past, the project is using only period construction techniques, tools, and costumes. Materials, including wood and stone, are all obtained locally. Jacques Moulin, chief architect for the project, designed the castle according to the architectural model developed during the 12th and 13th centuries by Philip II of France.

Construction started in 1997 under Michel Guyot, owner of Château de Saint-Fargeau, a castle in Saint-Fargeau 13 kilometres (8.1 mi) away. The site was chosen according to the availability of construction materials: an abandoned stone quarry, in a large forest, with a nearby pond. The site is in a rural woodland area and the nearest town is Saint-Sauveur-en-Puisaye, about 5 kilometres (3.1 mi) to the northeast.

== History ==
In 1979, French entrepreneur Michel Guyot purchased the ruins of the Château de Saint-Fargeau and began restoring it with profits raised on-site. In late 1995, a study by Guyot's staff revealed the medieval foundations beneath the current, brick ruins, complete with a hypothesized plan of the original castle. After some consideration, Guyot rebuilt the existing castle, but began assembling funds and experts – and opening negotiations with the French government – to build a new castle. Over five months in 1997, Guyot raised €400,000 from the European Union, local and the central French governments, and commercial entities.

A former sandstone quarry was chosen as the site of Guédelon Castle because of its relative elevation and abundance of local natural resources, which would have been expensive to transport in the Middle Ages. The castle location is in a woodland, two hours south of Paris, near Treigny. The ceremonial first stone was laid on 20 June 1997, and permission for the construction was received from the commune of Treigny on 25 July 1997.

After ground-breaking mid-1997 through early 1998, the site was cleared and the first workshops erected. By 1998 the castle perimeter had been built up to a metre (3 ¼ feet) in height, following which Guédelon was opened to the public. By June 2010, the great tower stood at 15 metres (49 ft).

By 2014, the castle was attracting about 300,000 visitors annually, and had annual revenue of about three million euros.

The techniques redeveloped for Guédelon Castle were used in the reconstruction of Notre-Dame cathedral in Paris after its catastrophic 2019 fire.

== Media ==
Guédelon Castle appeared in the 2004 documentary Europe in the Middle Ages. In November 2014 the castle was featured in the series, Secrets of the Castle, in which the project was described as "the world's biggest archaeological experiment". In September 2022, Guédelon Castle was featured in a video by presenter Tom Scott, which explored the use of medieval treadmill cranes in its construction.

== Construction images ==
Evolution of the construction since 2000

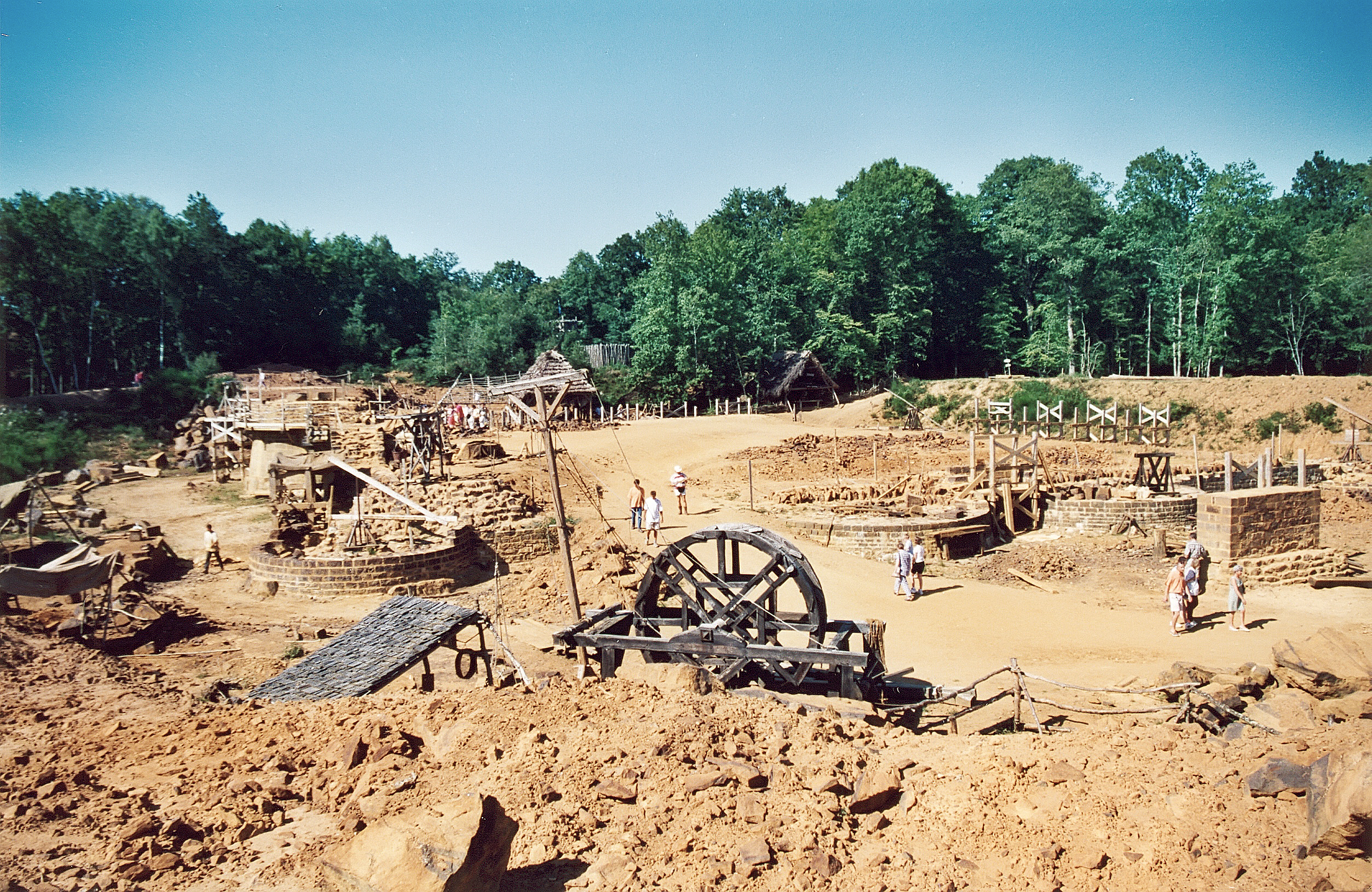
2000

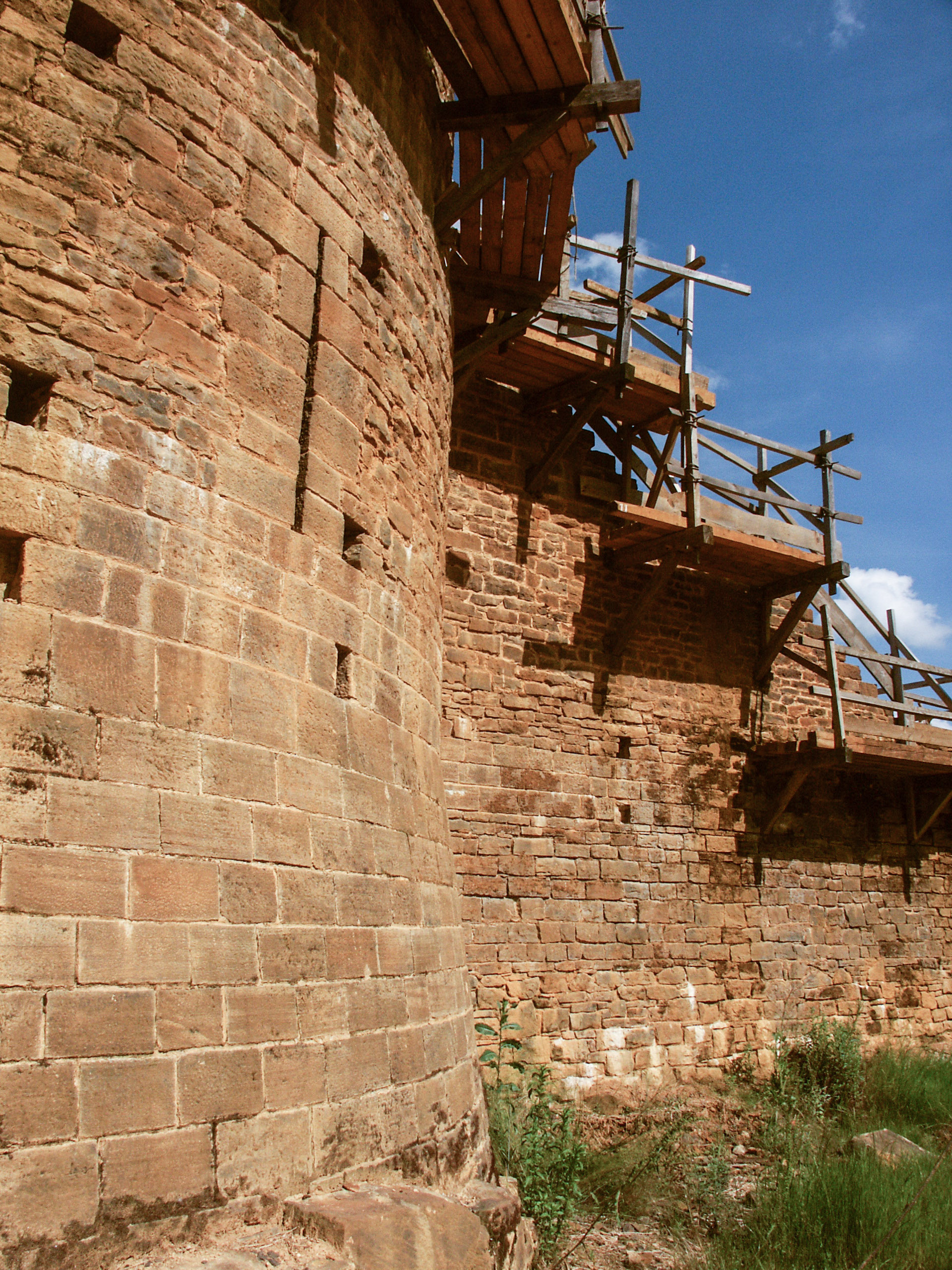
2004

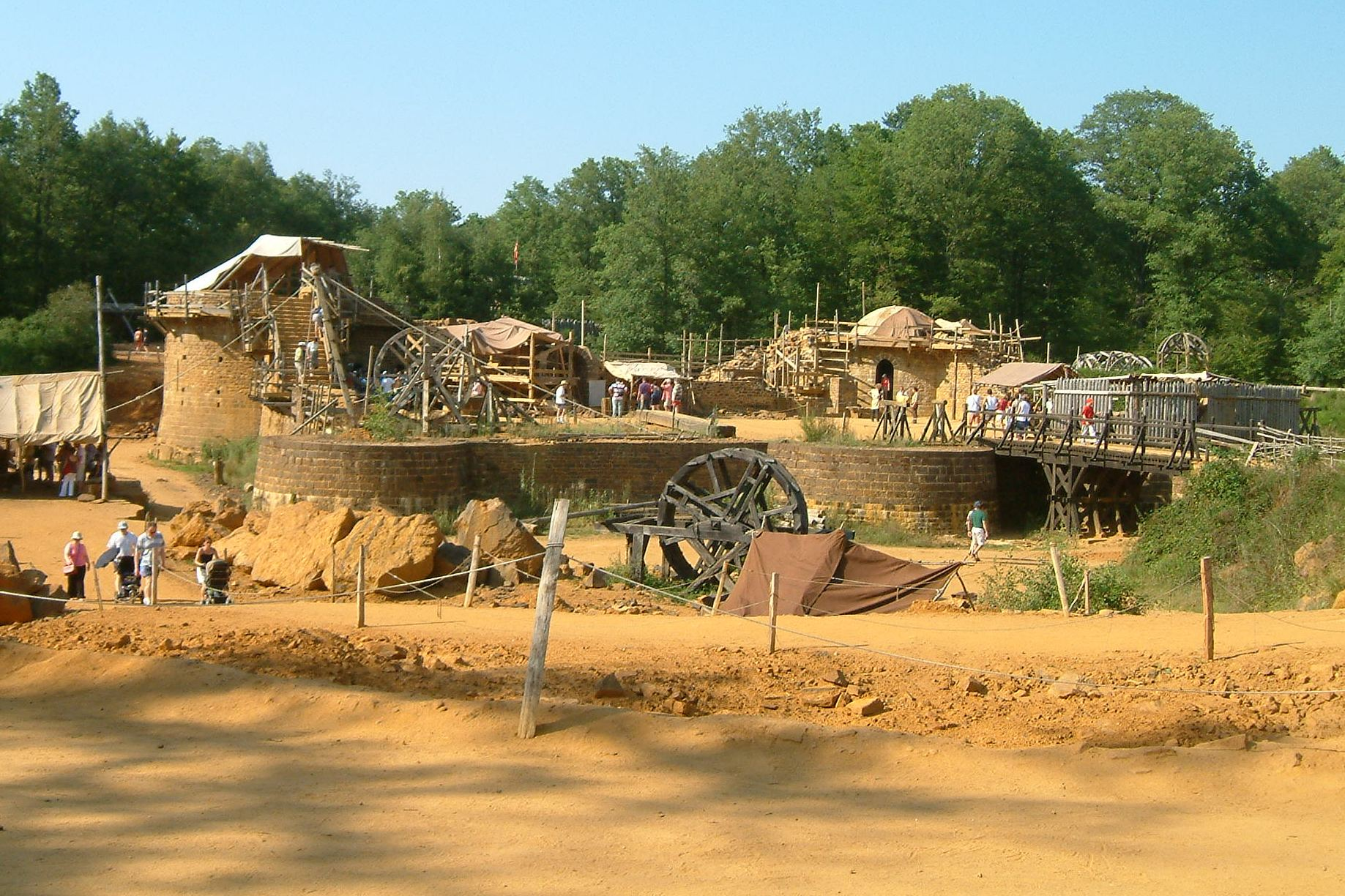
2005

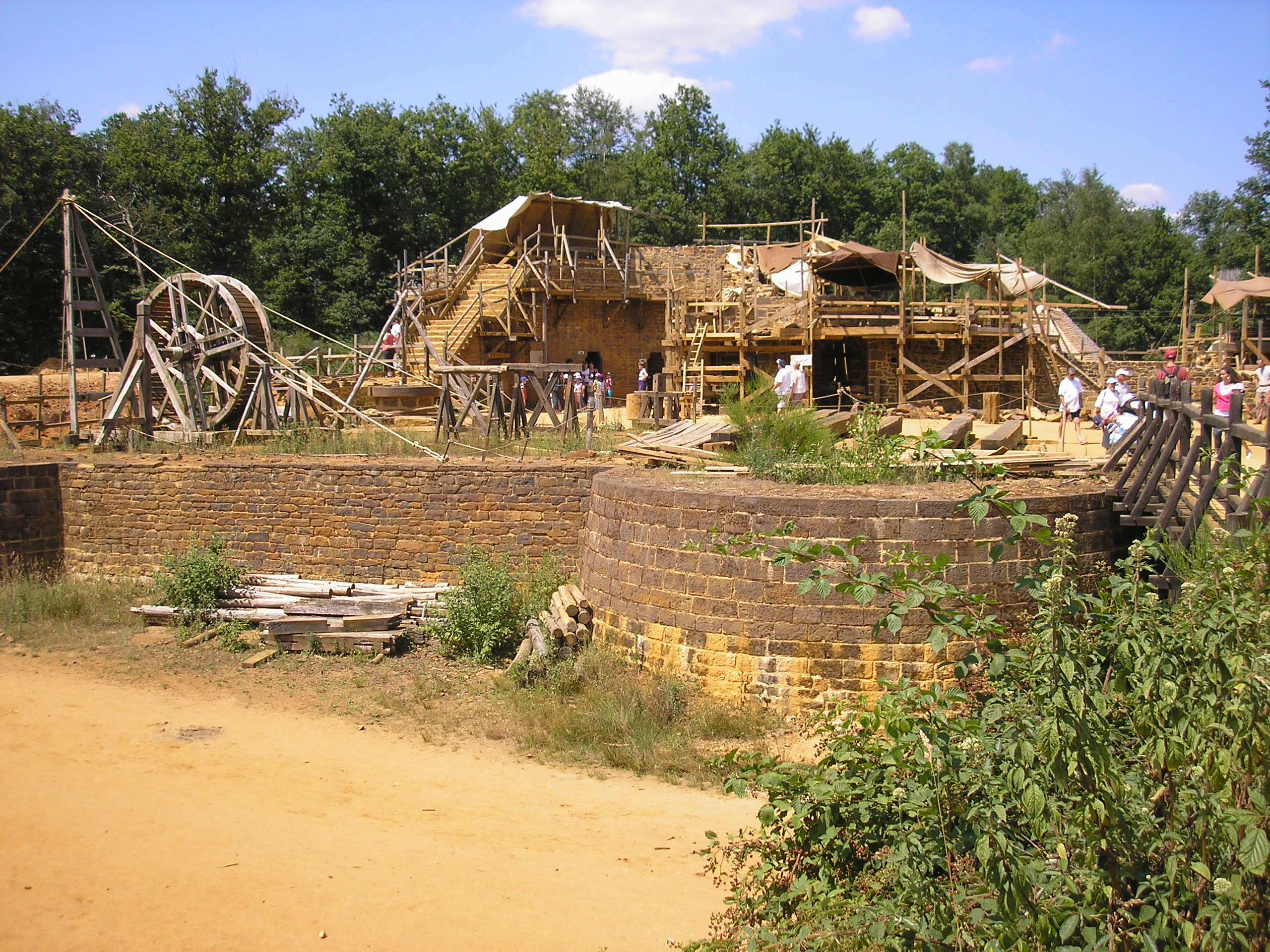
2006

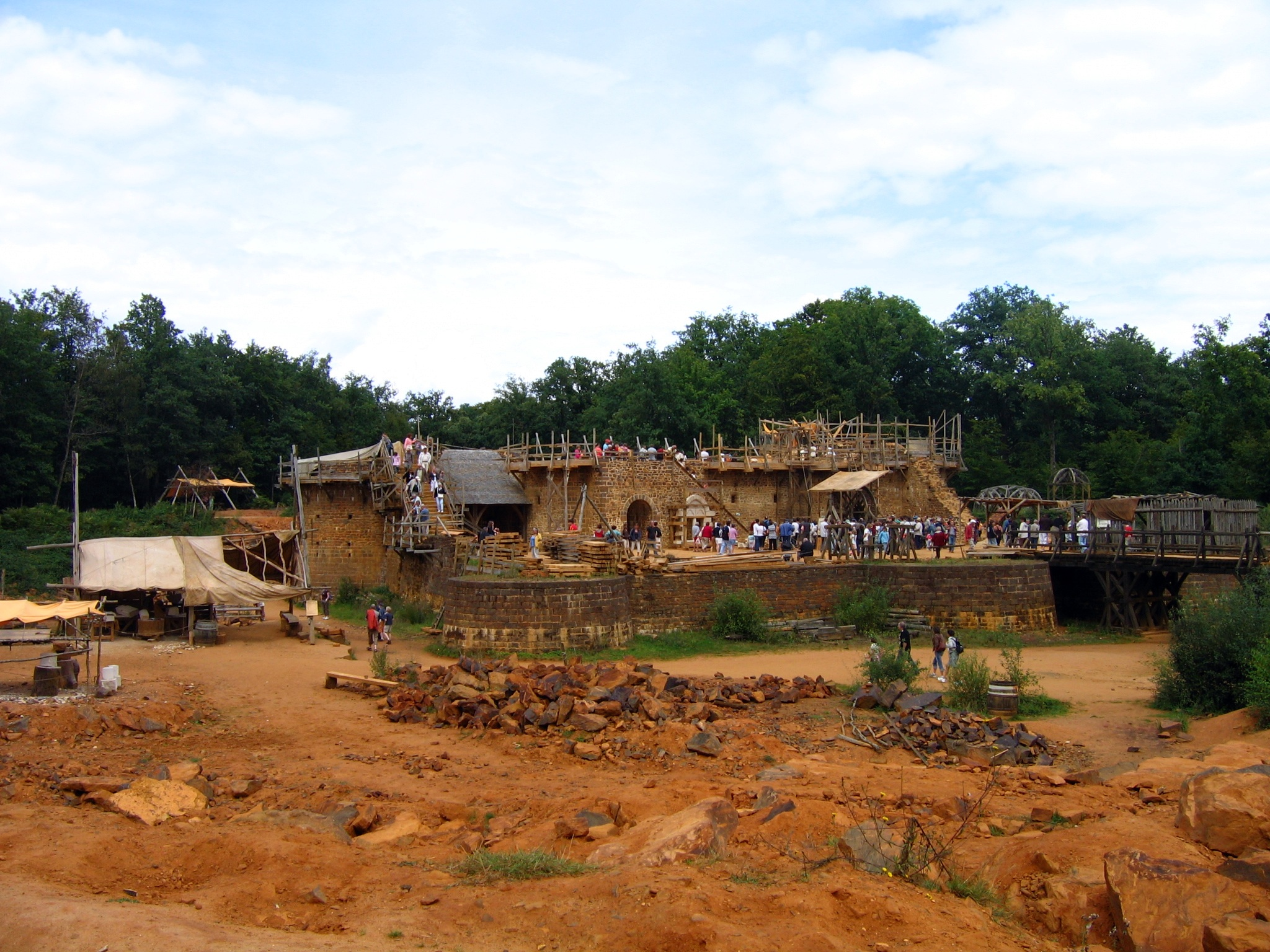
2007

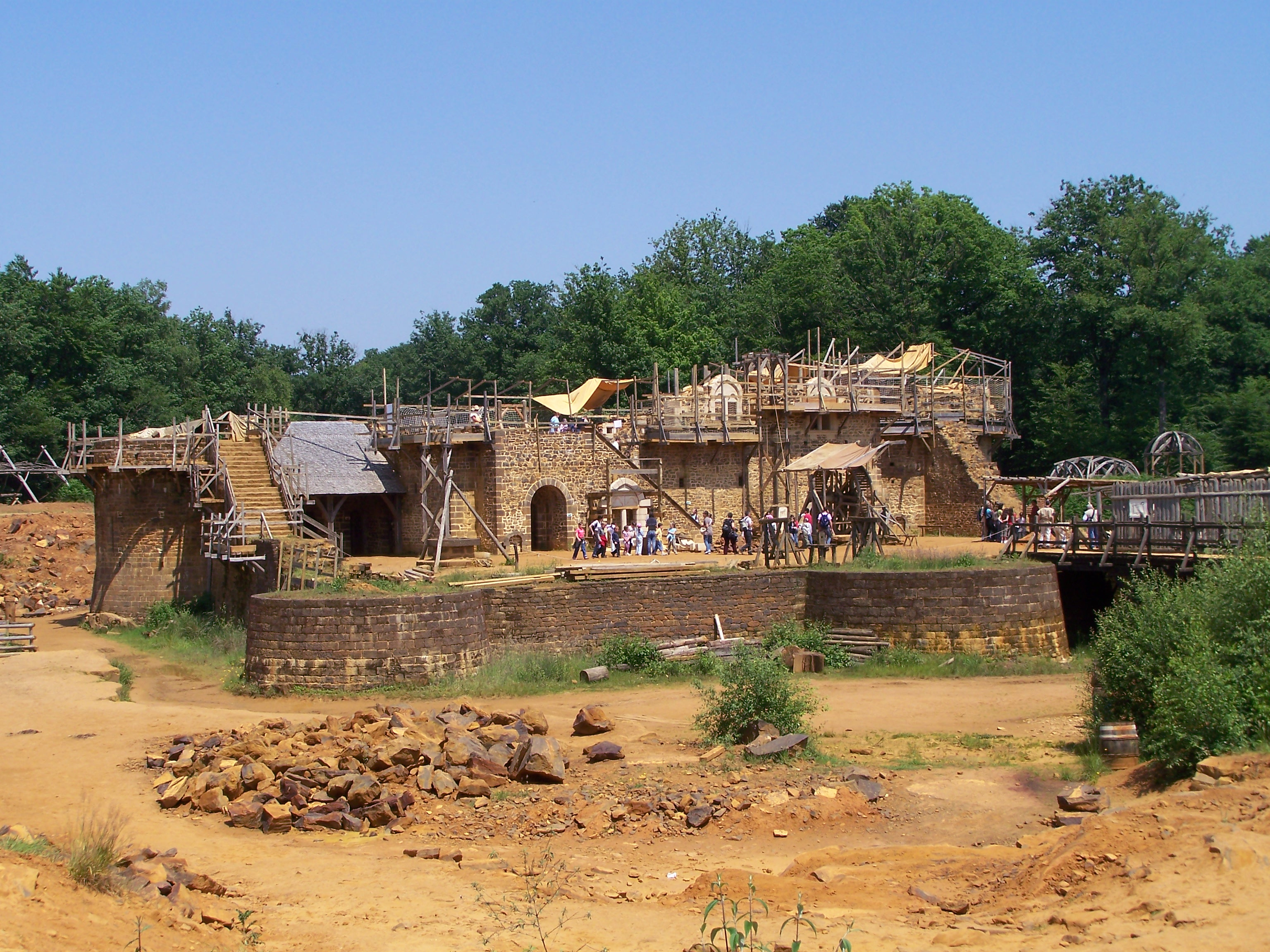
2008

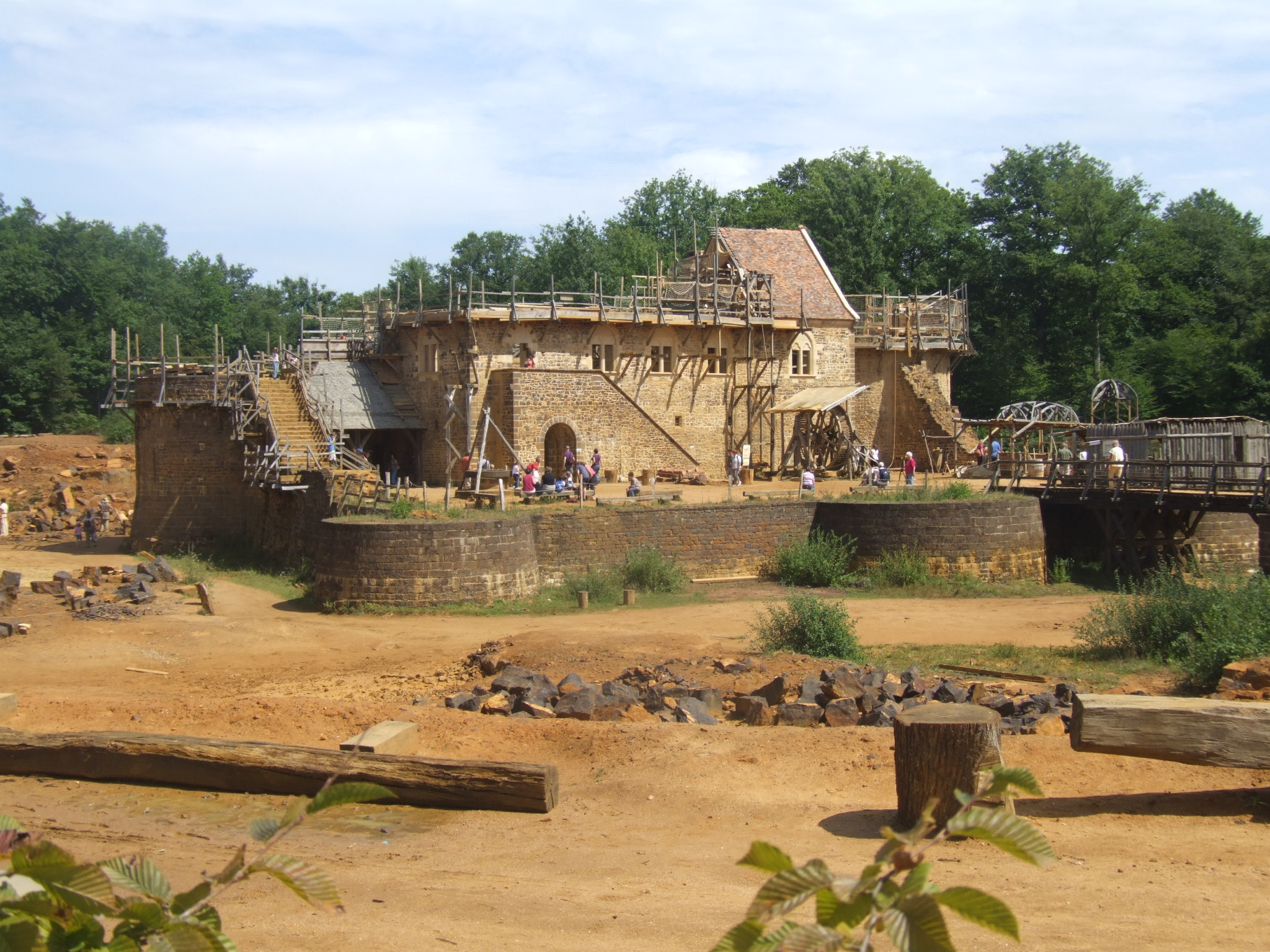
2009

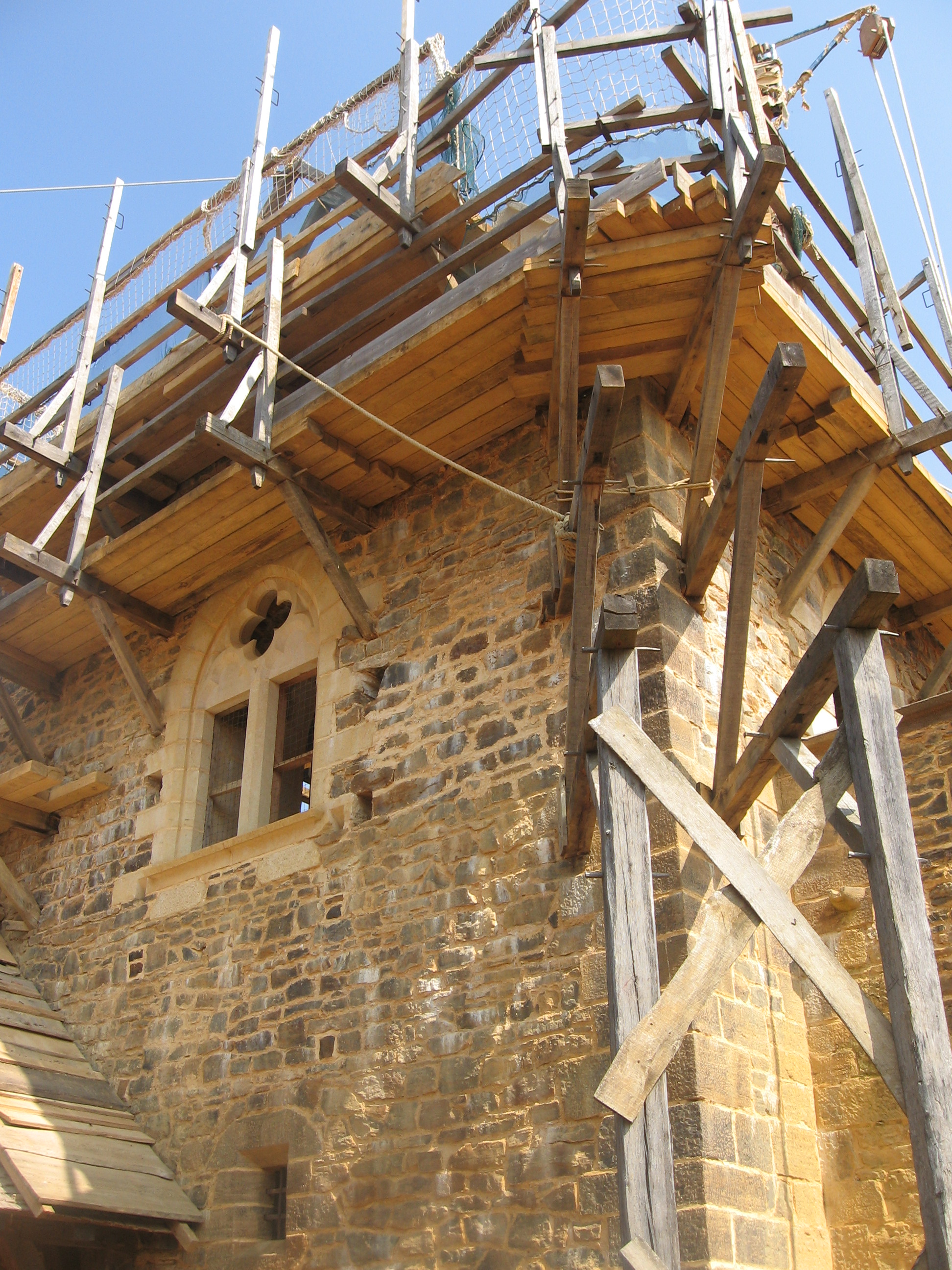
2010

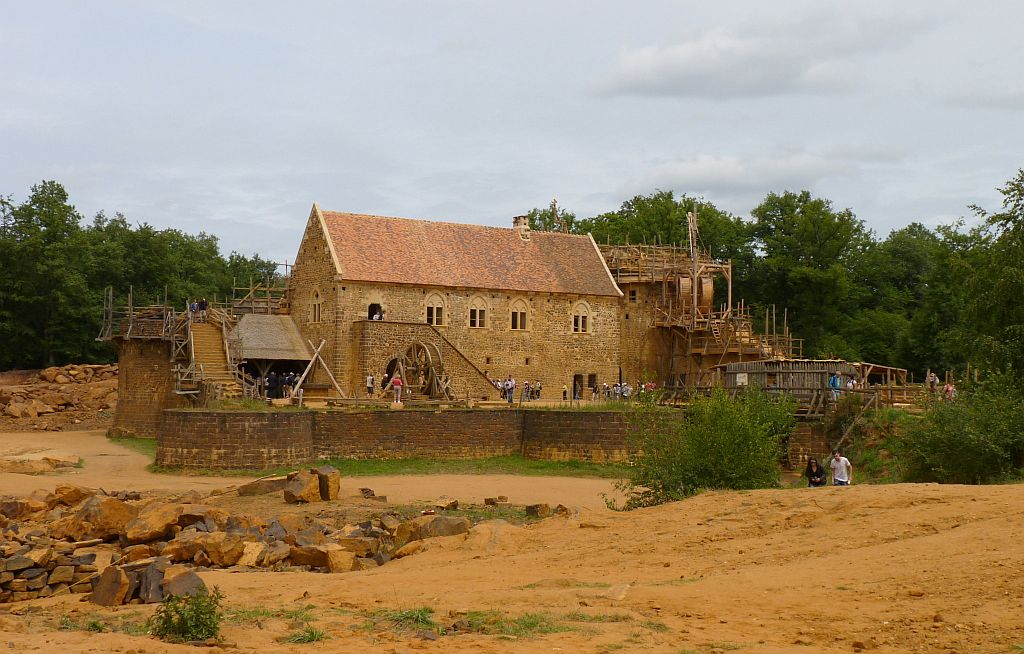
2011

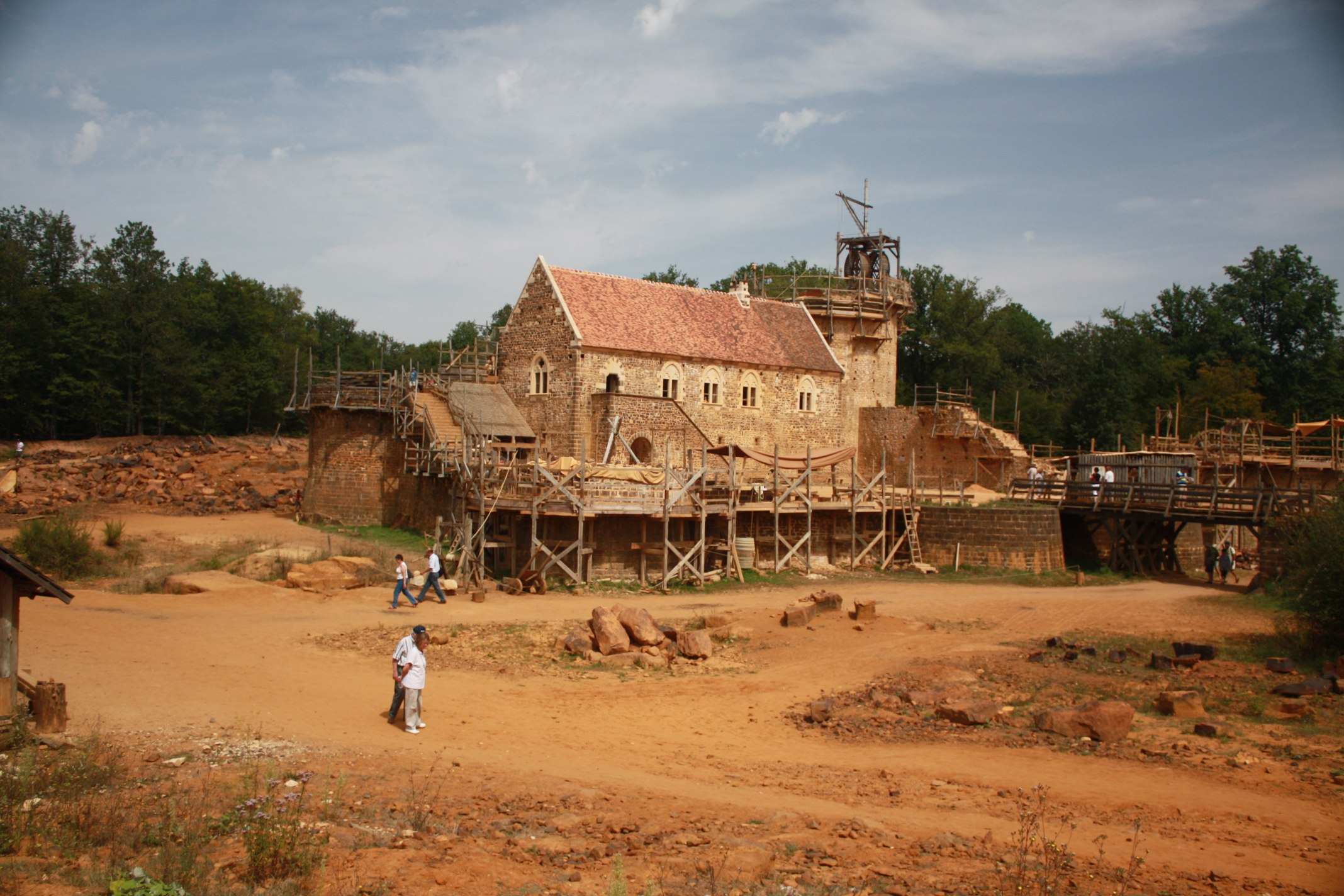
2012

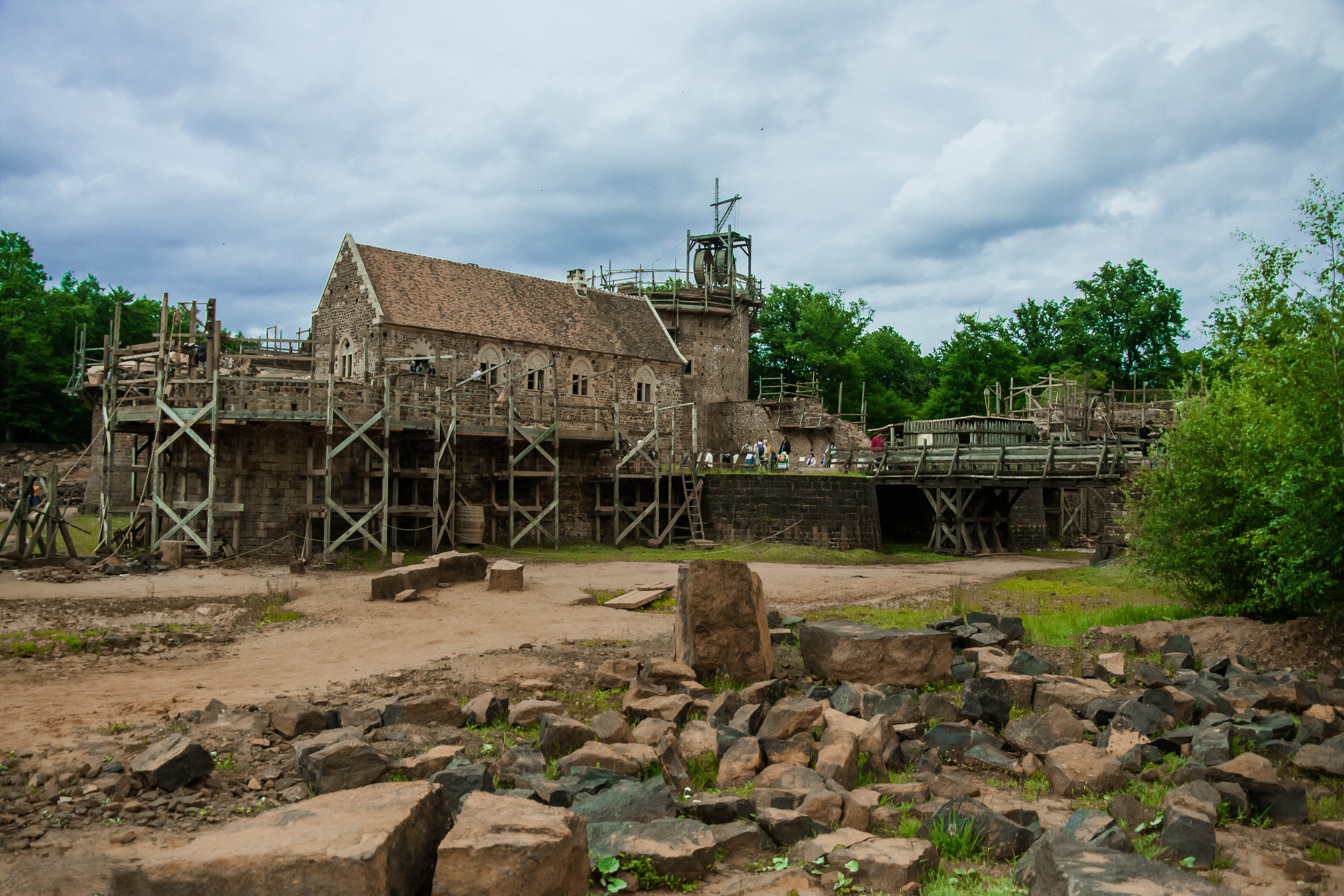
2013

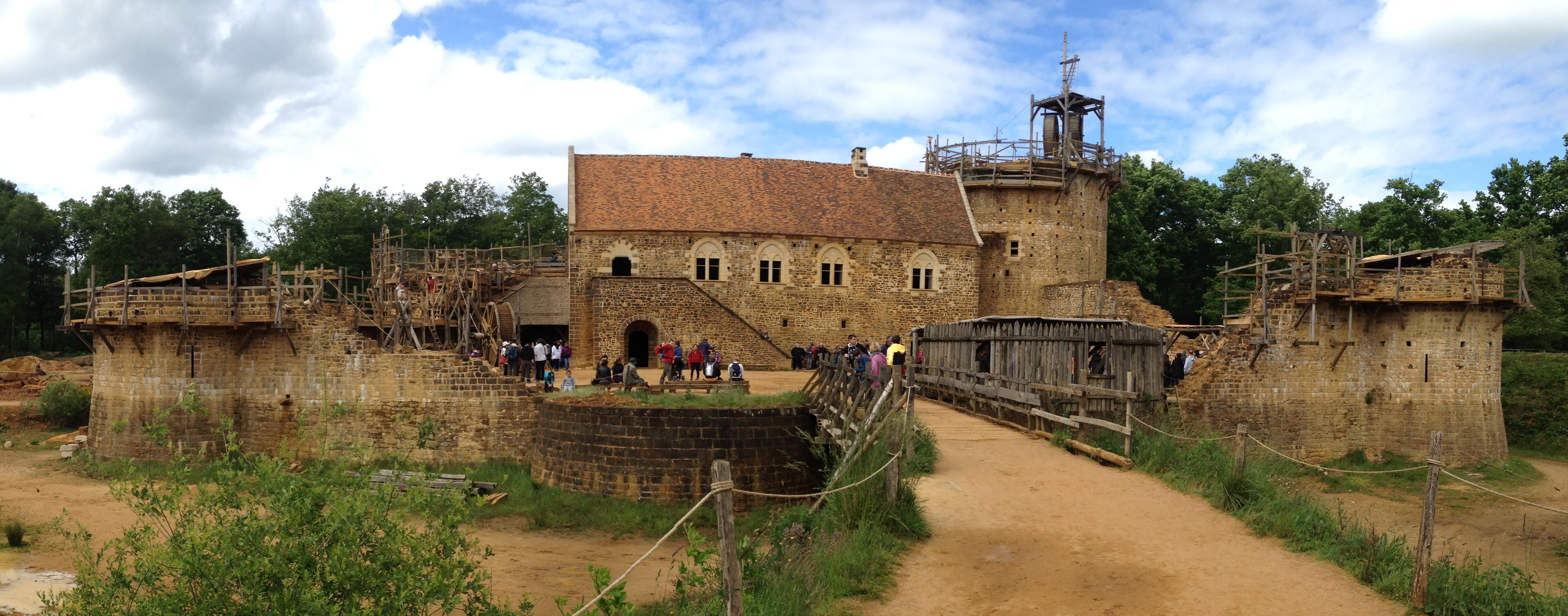
2014

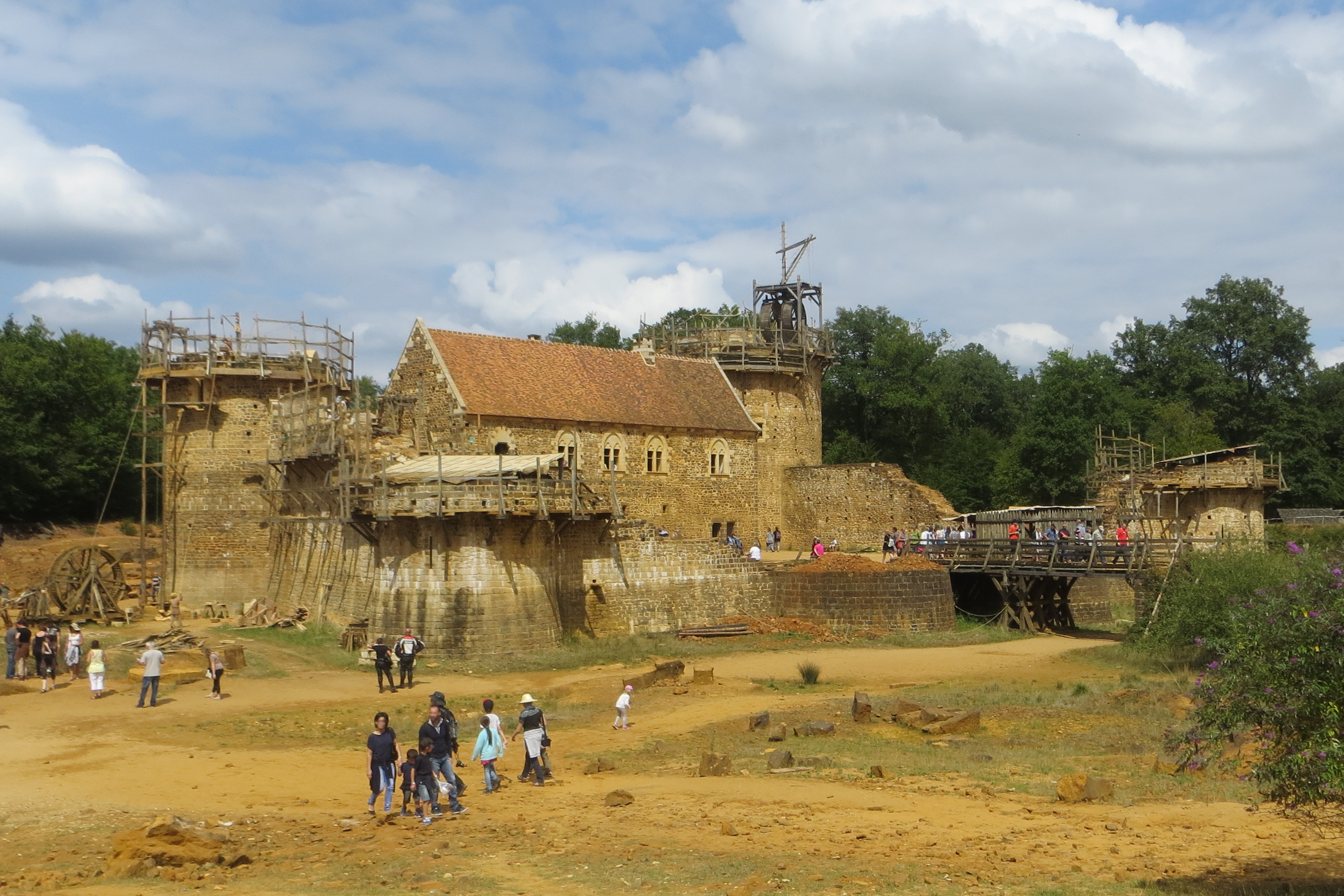
2015

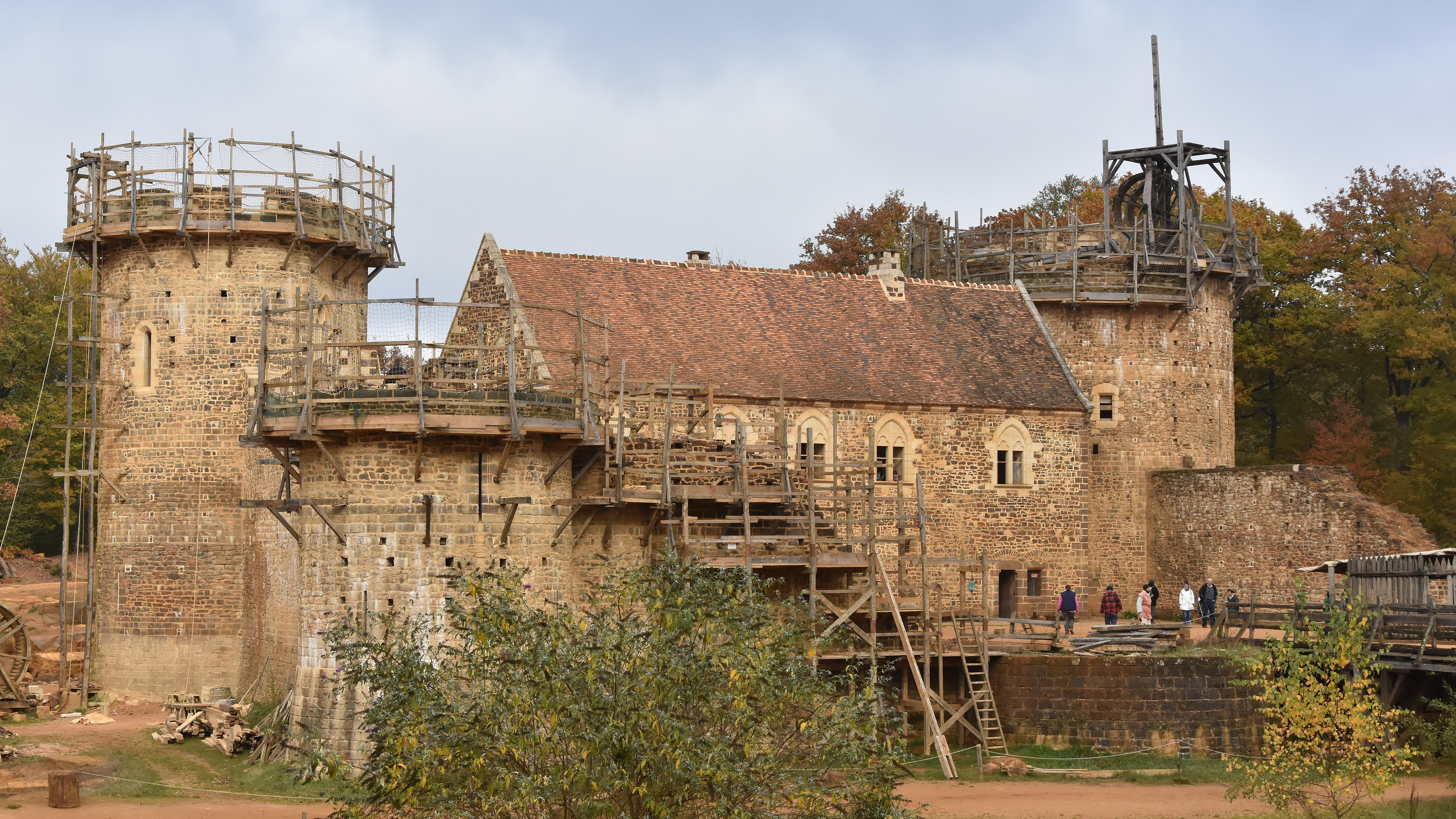
2016

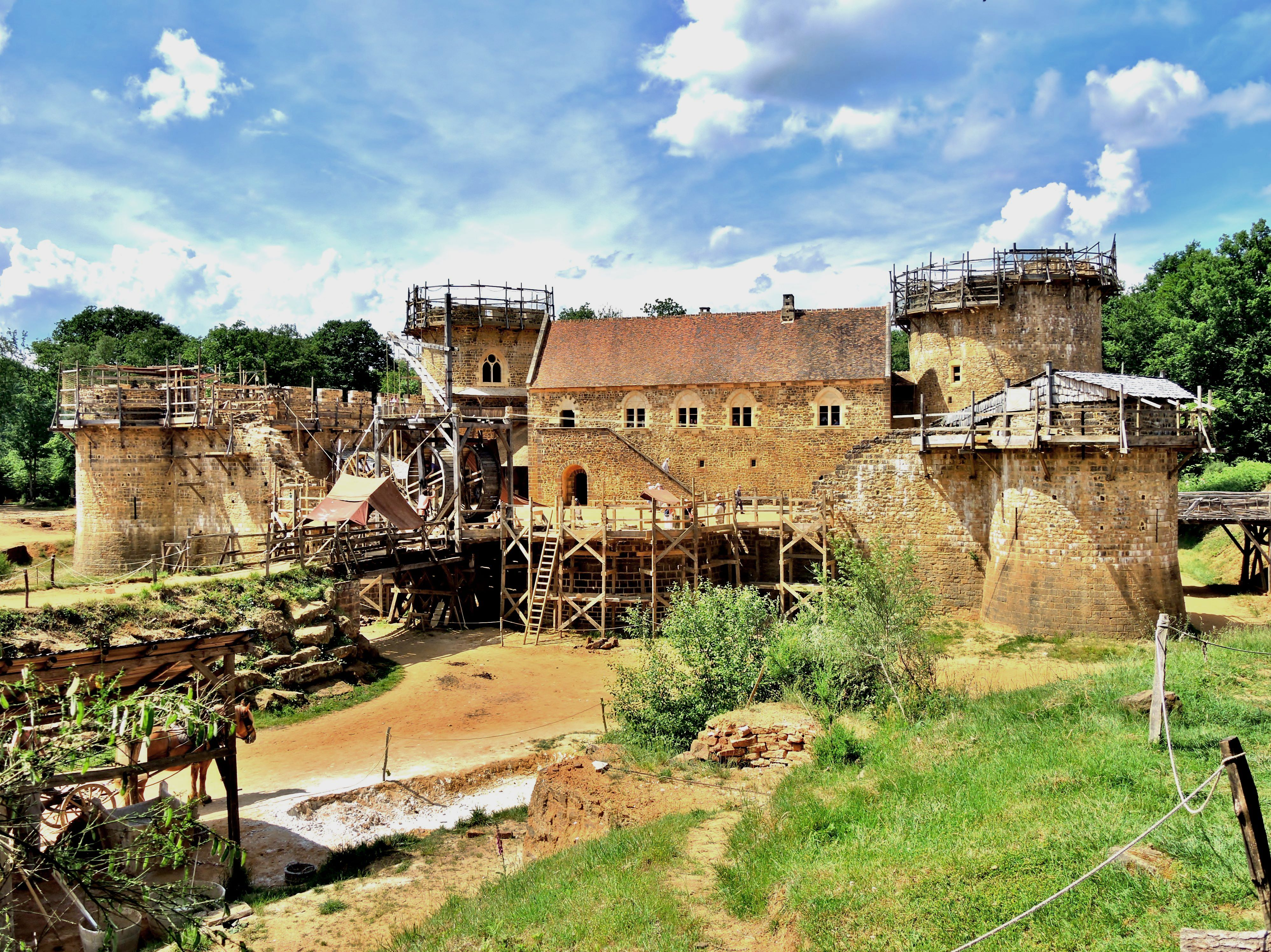
2017

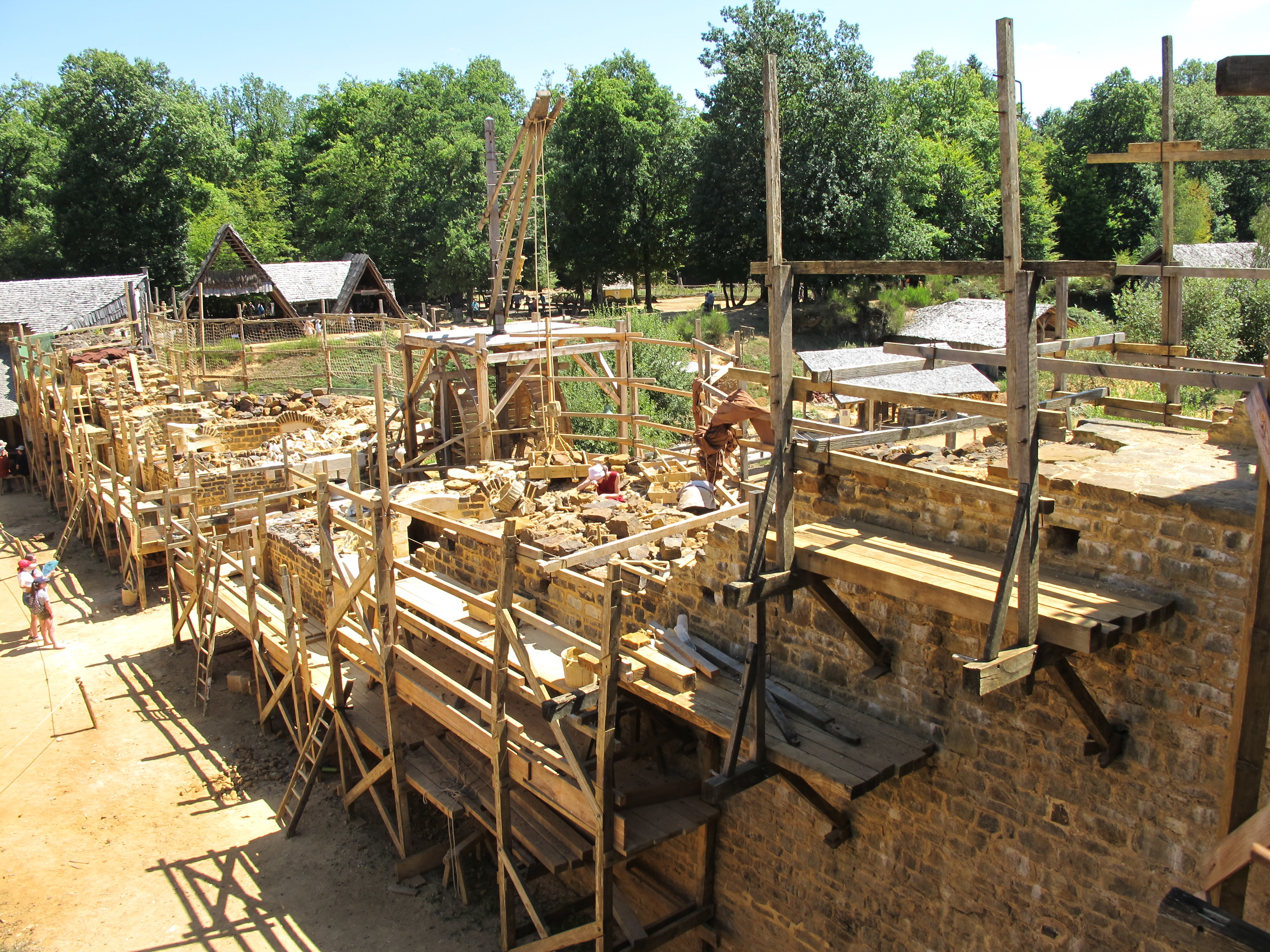
2018

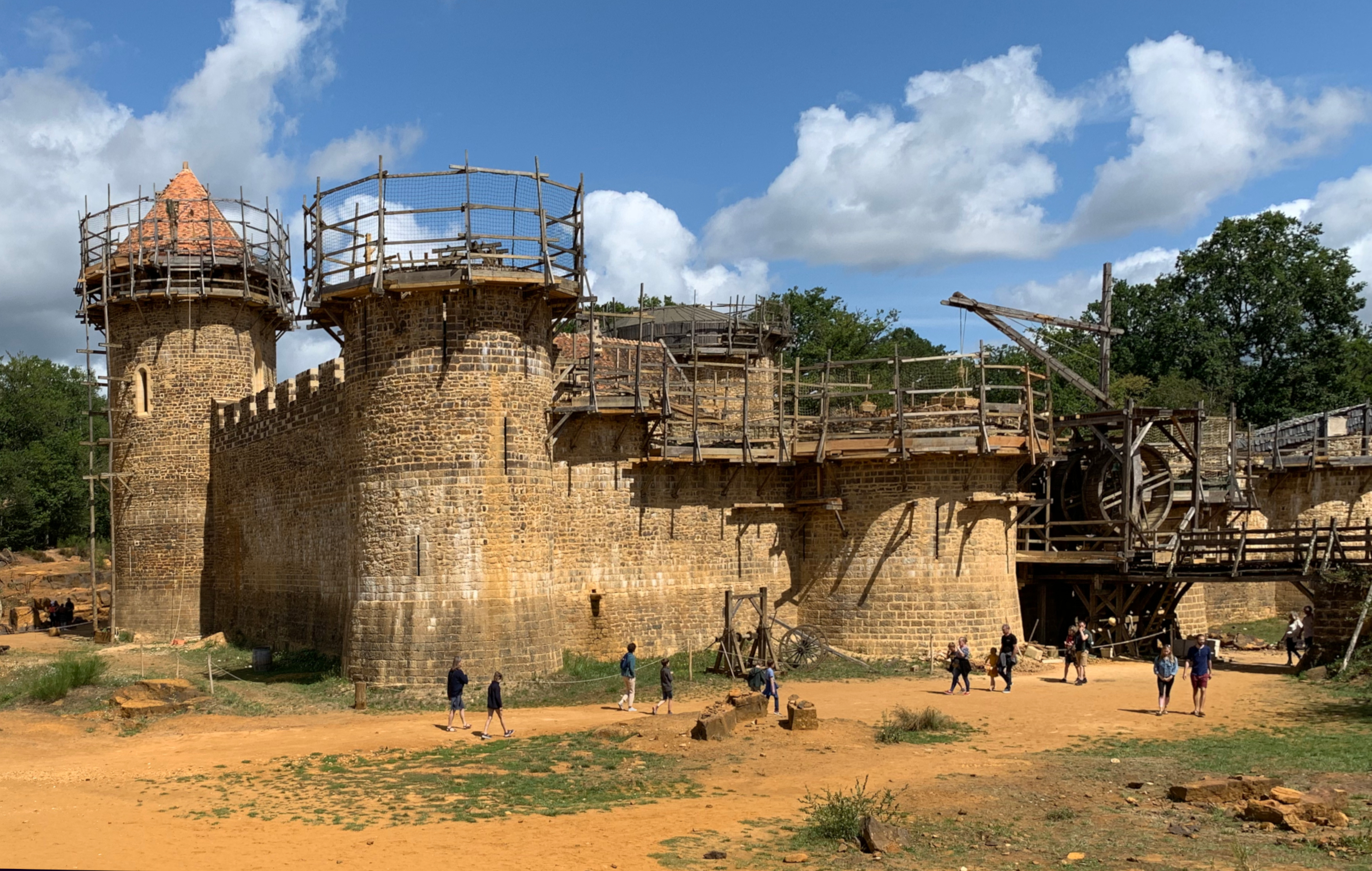
2019

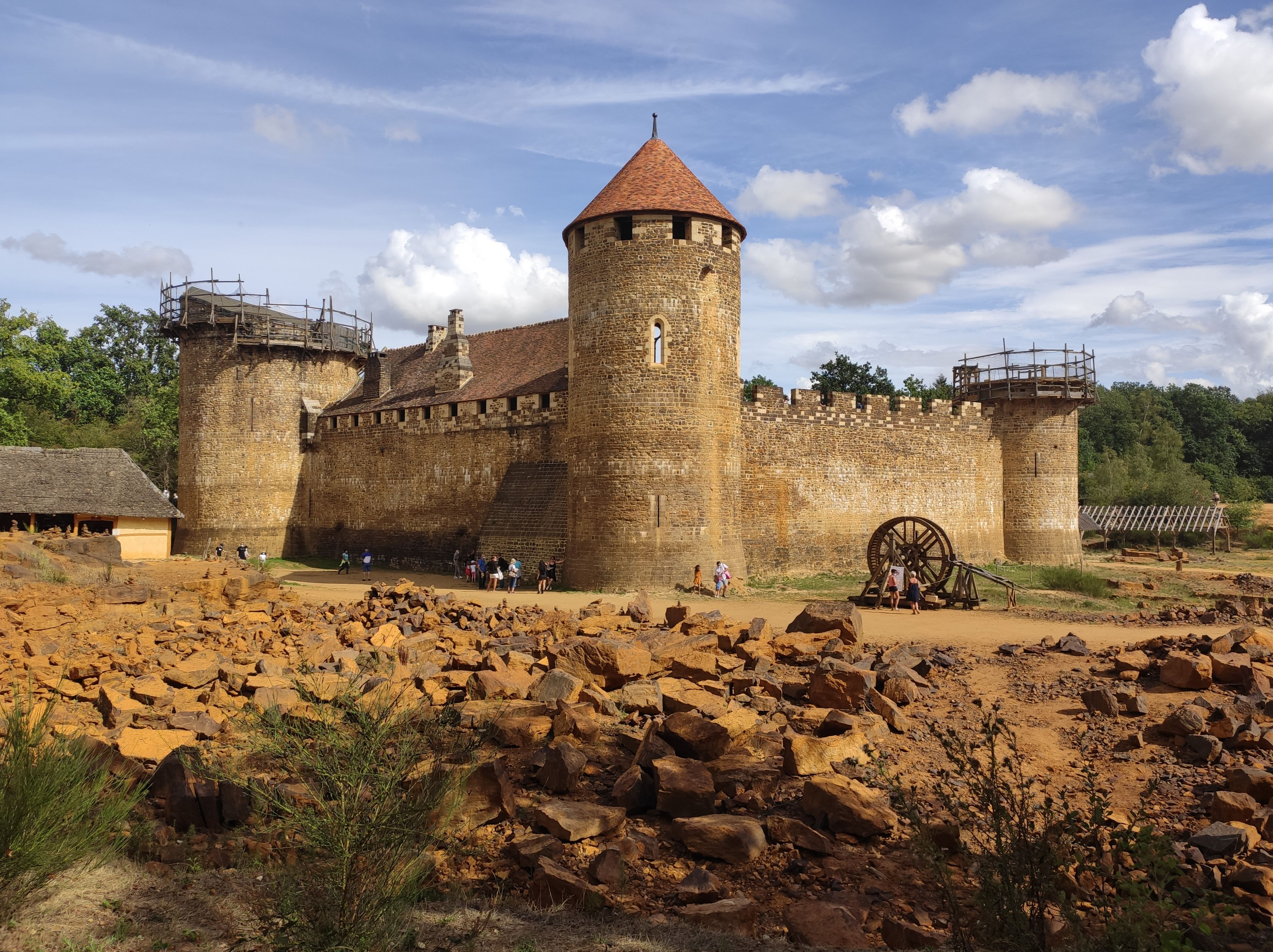
2020

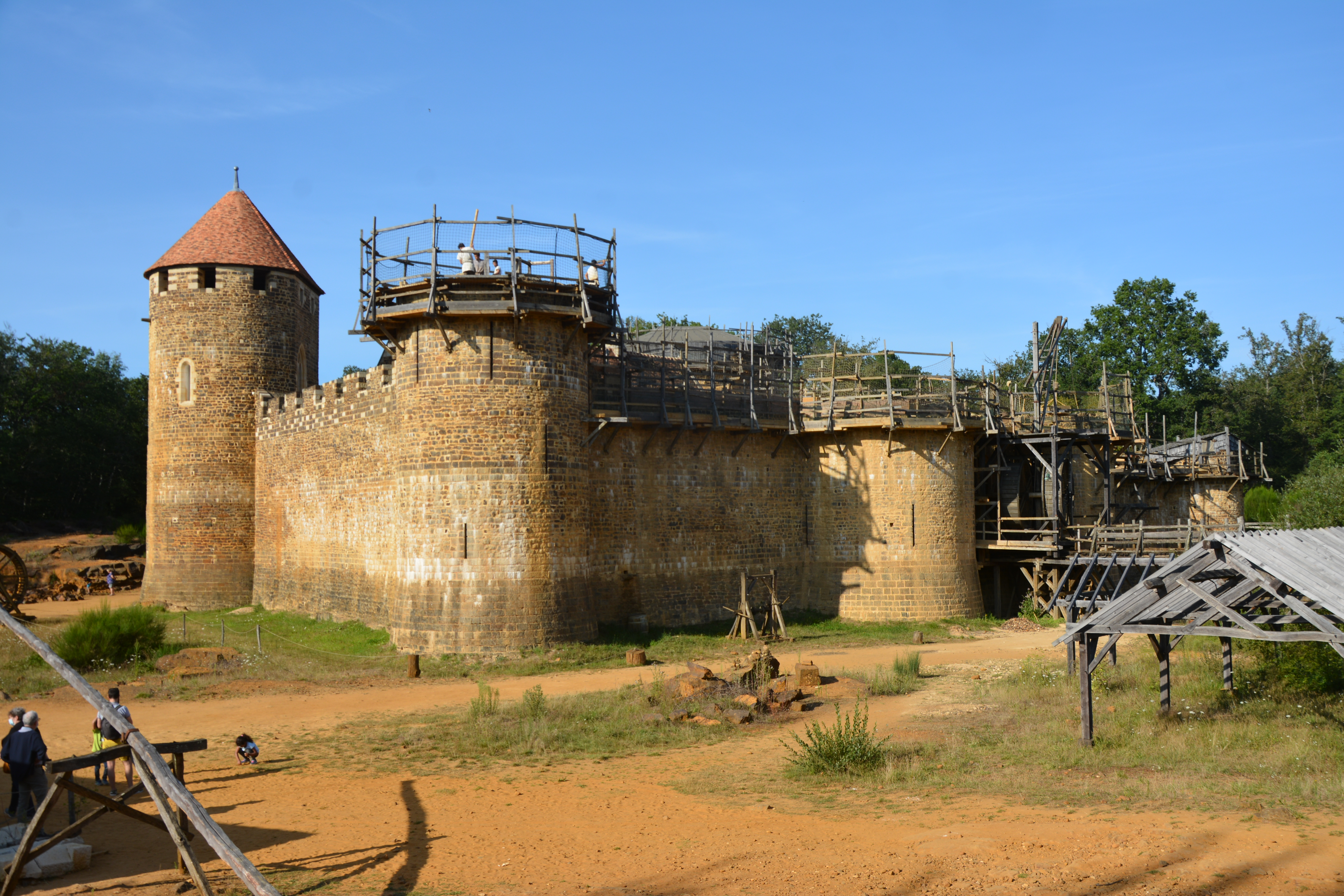
2021

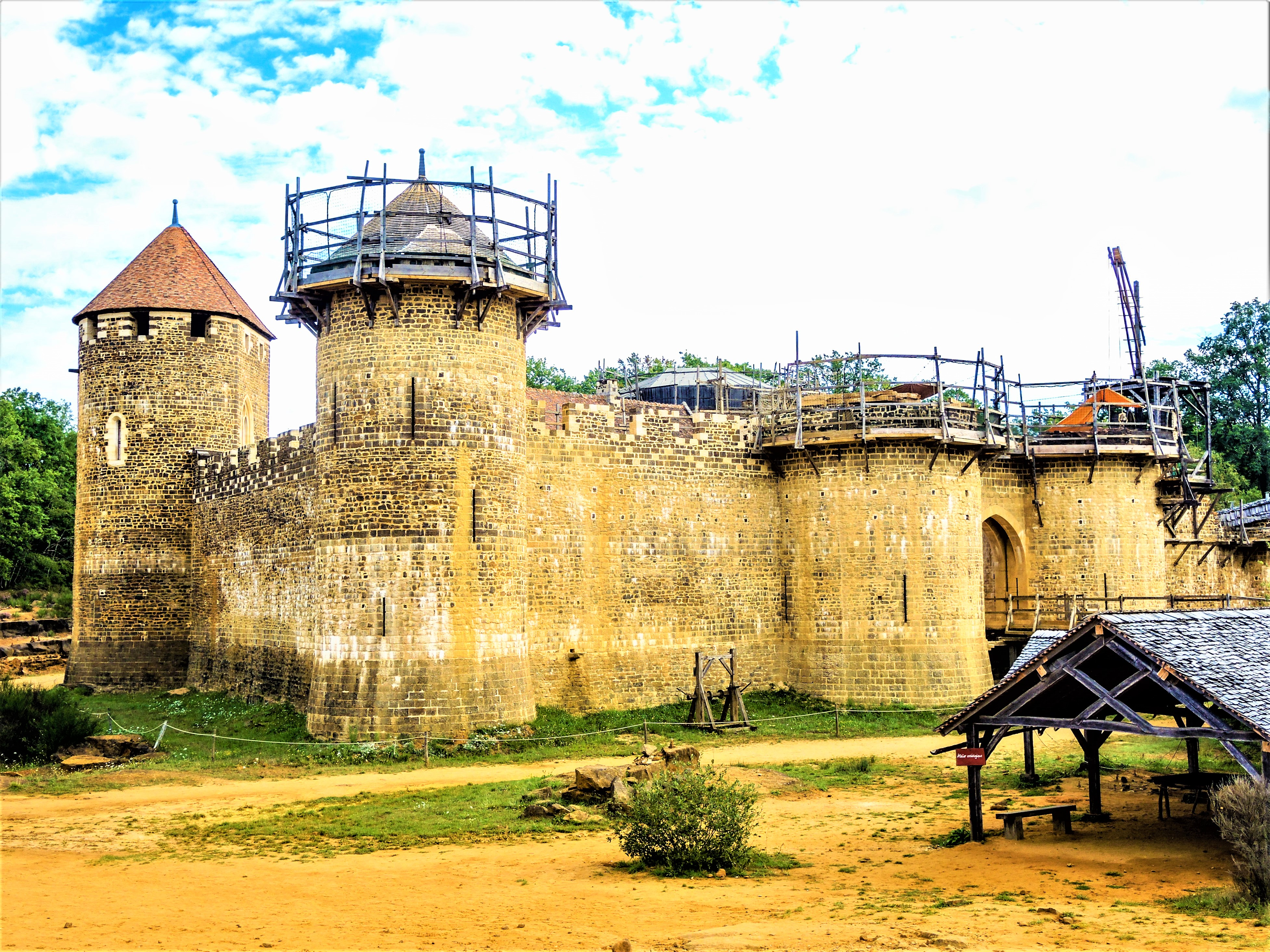
2023

2025

== Gallery ==
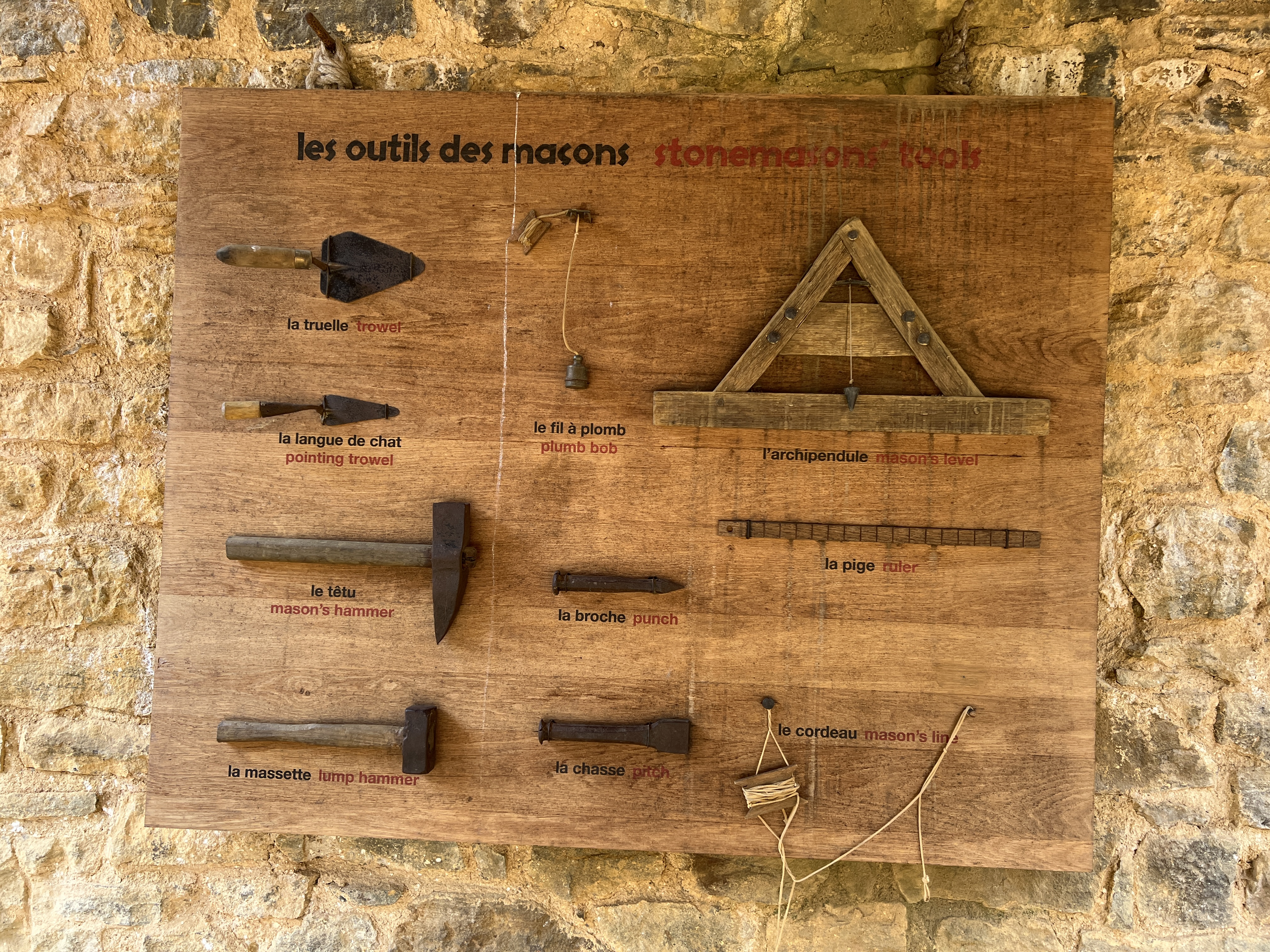
Stonemason tools of Guédelon

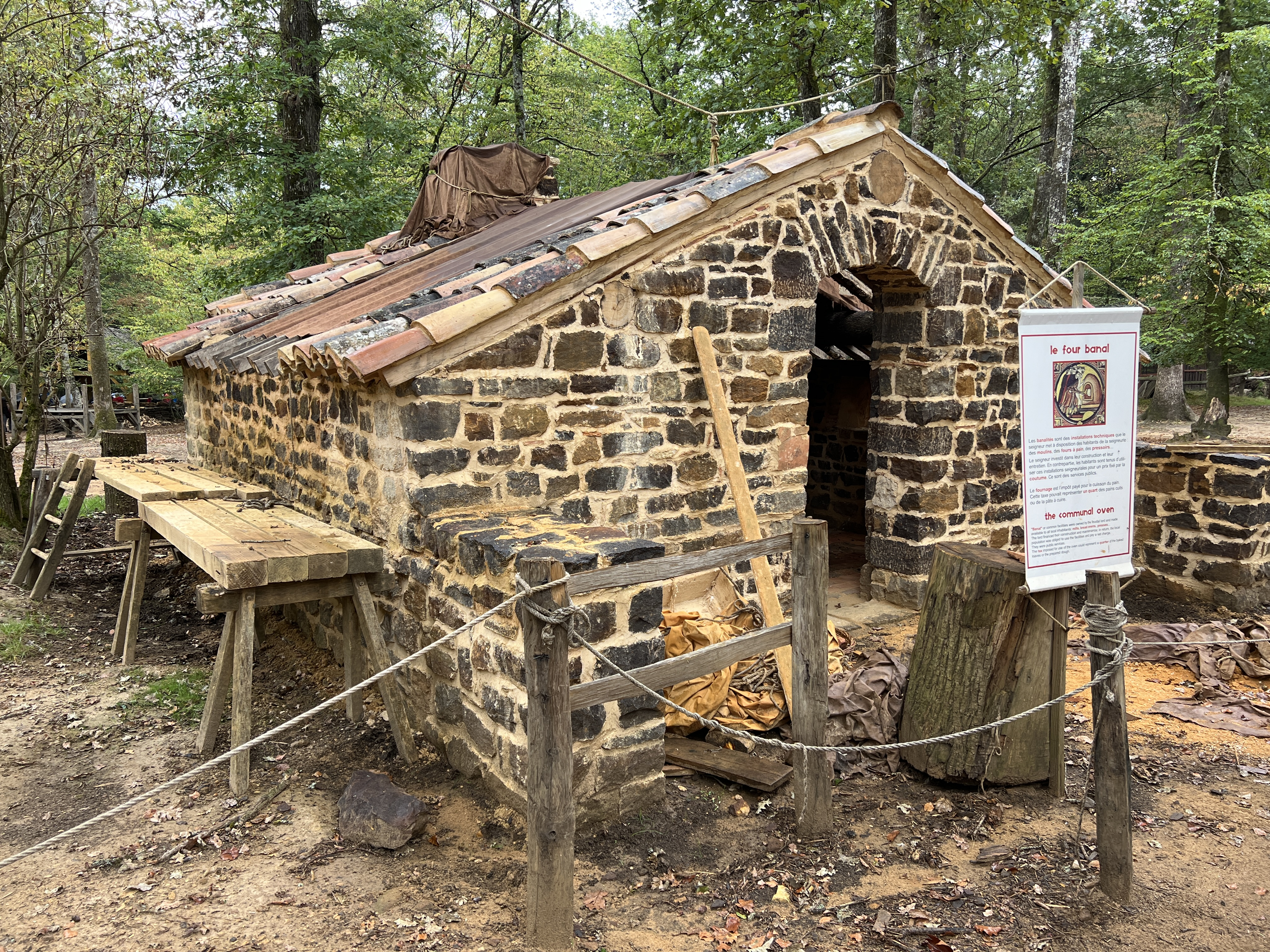
A communal oven

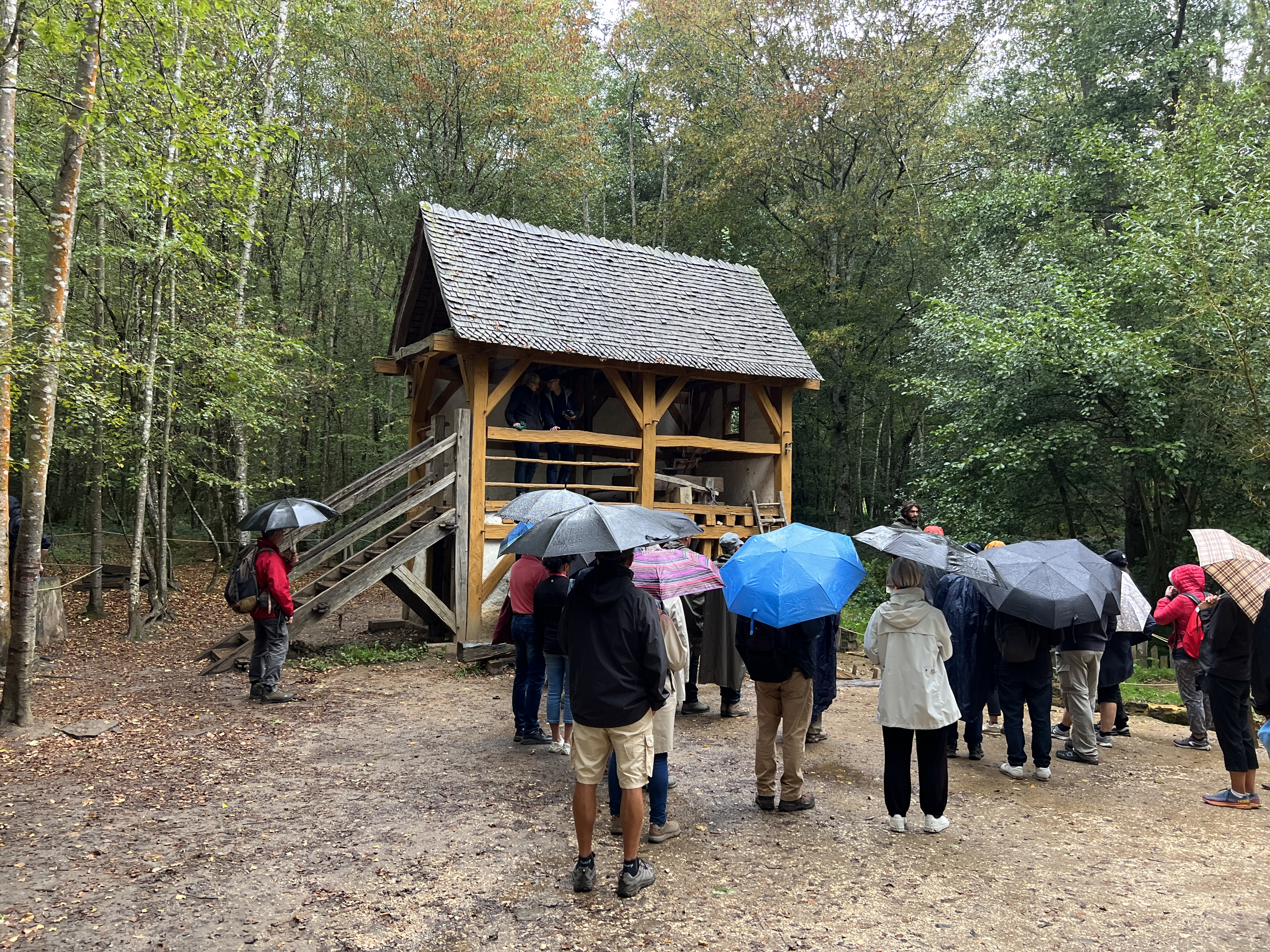
Guédelon mill, Treigny-Perreuse-Sainte-Colombe.

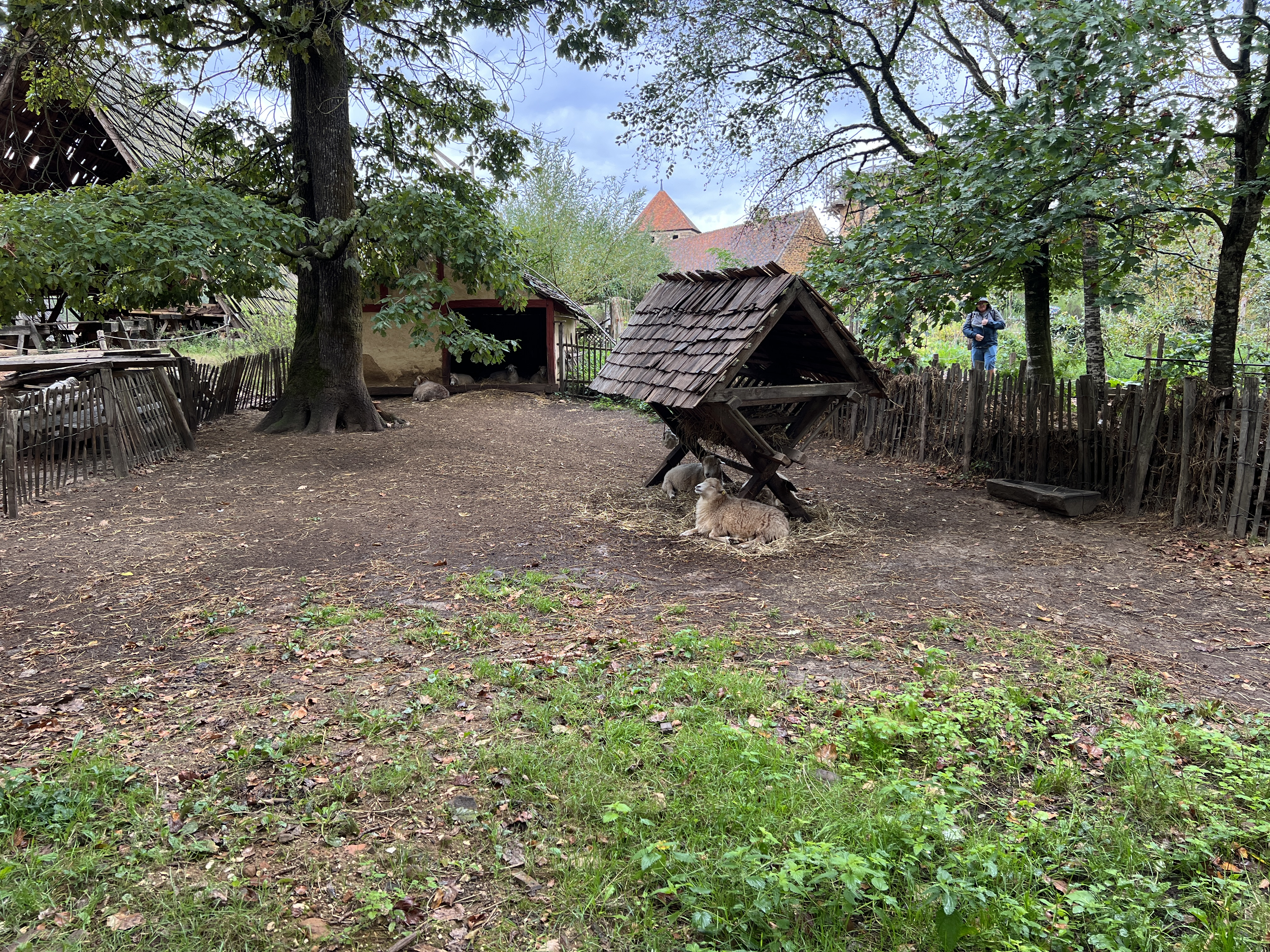
Sheep in Guédelon, Treigny-Perreuse-Sainte-Colombe.

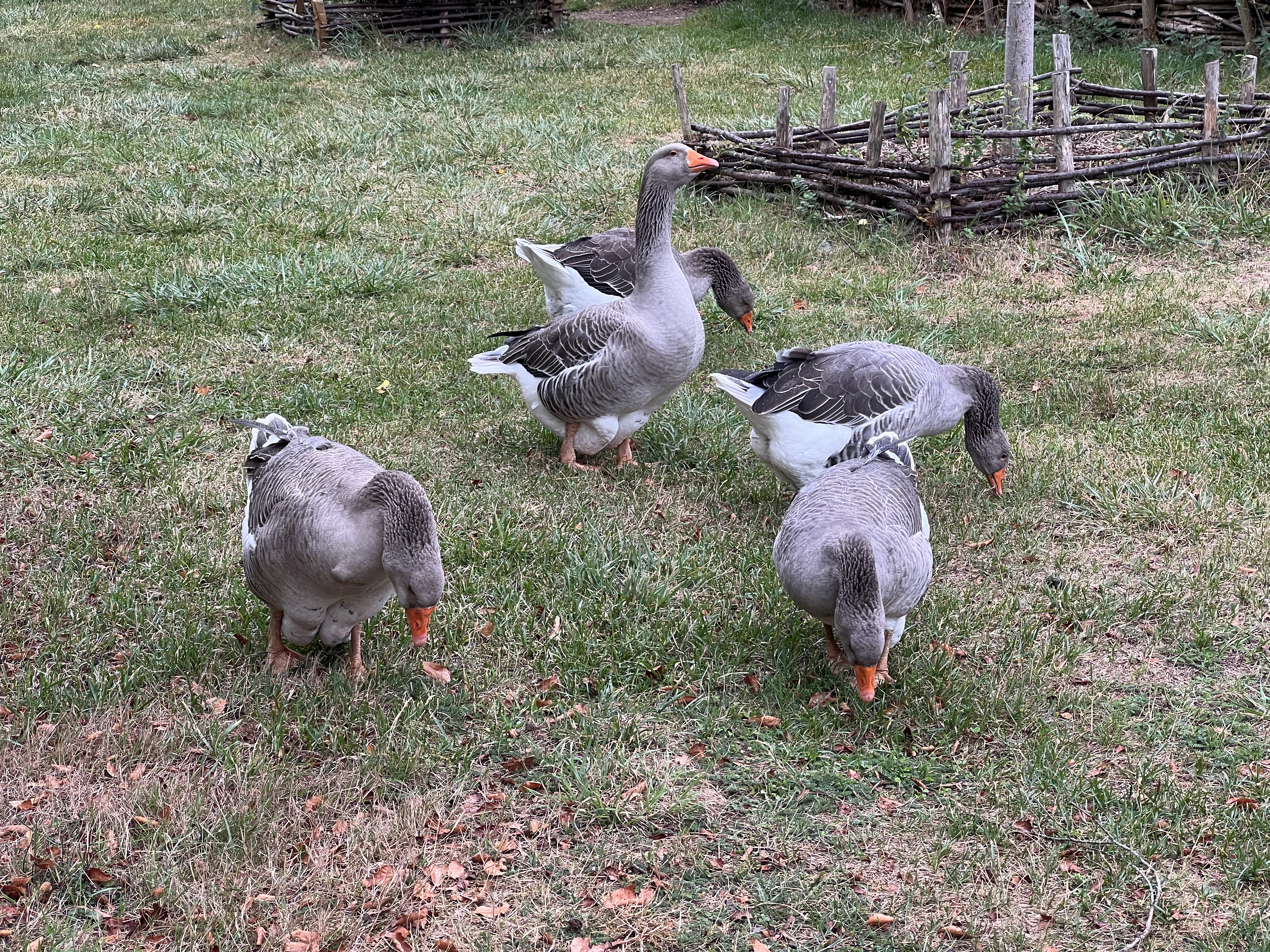
Geese in Guédelon, Treigny-Perreuse-Sainte-Colombe.

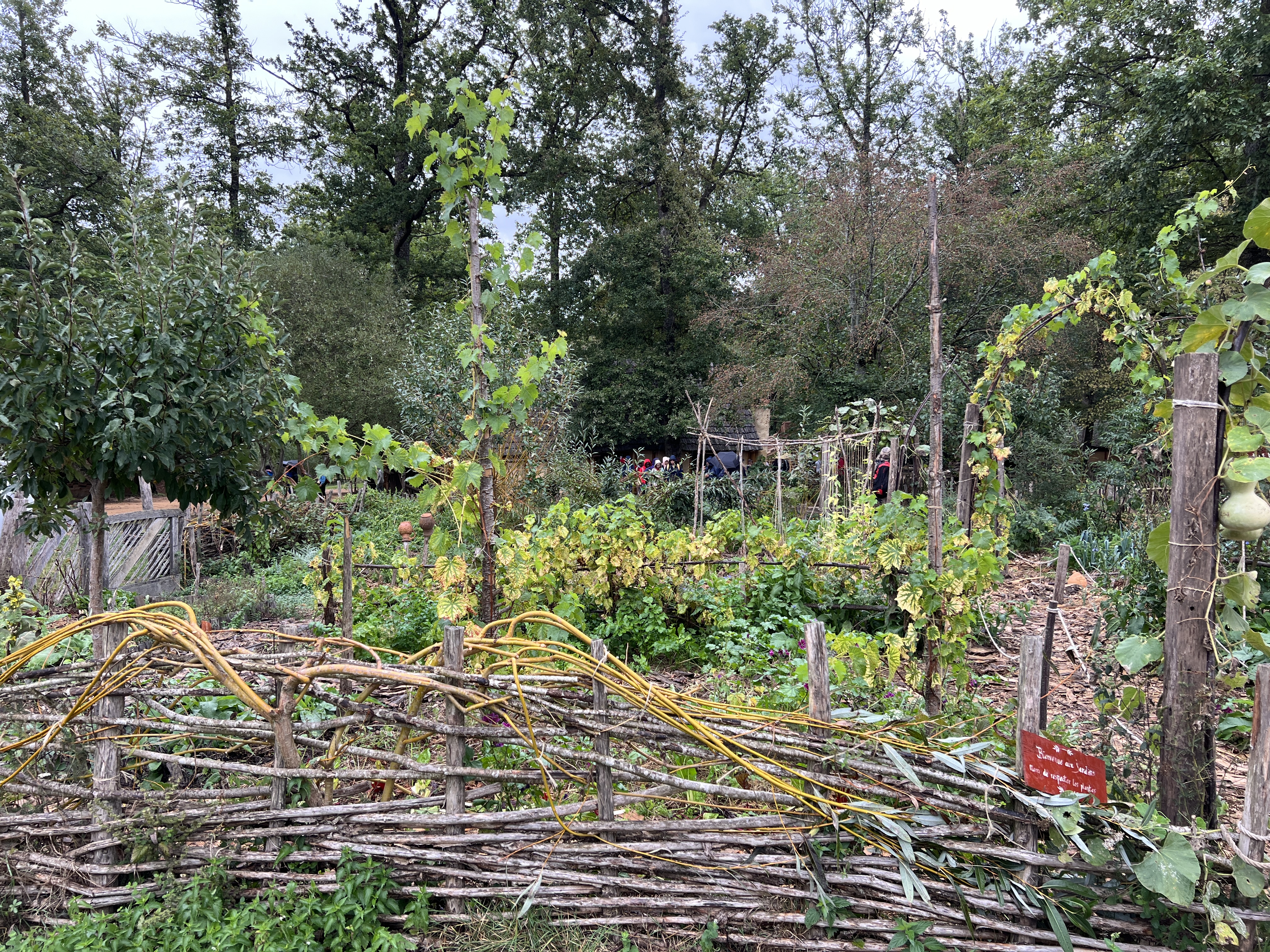
Guédelon vegetable garden, Treigny-Perreuse-Sainte-Colombe.

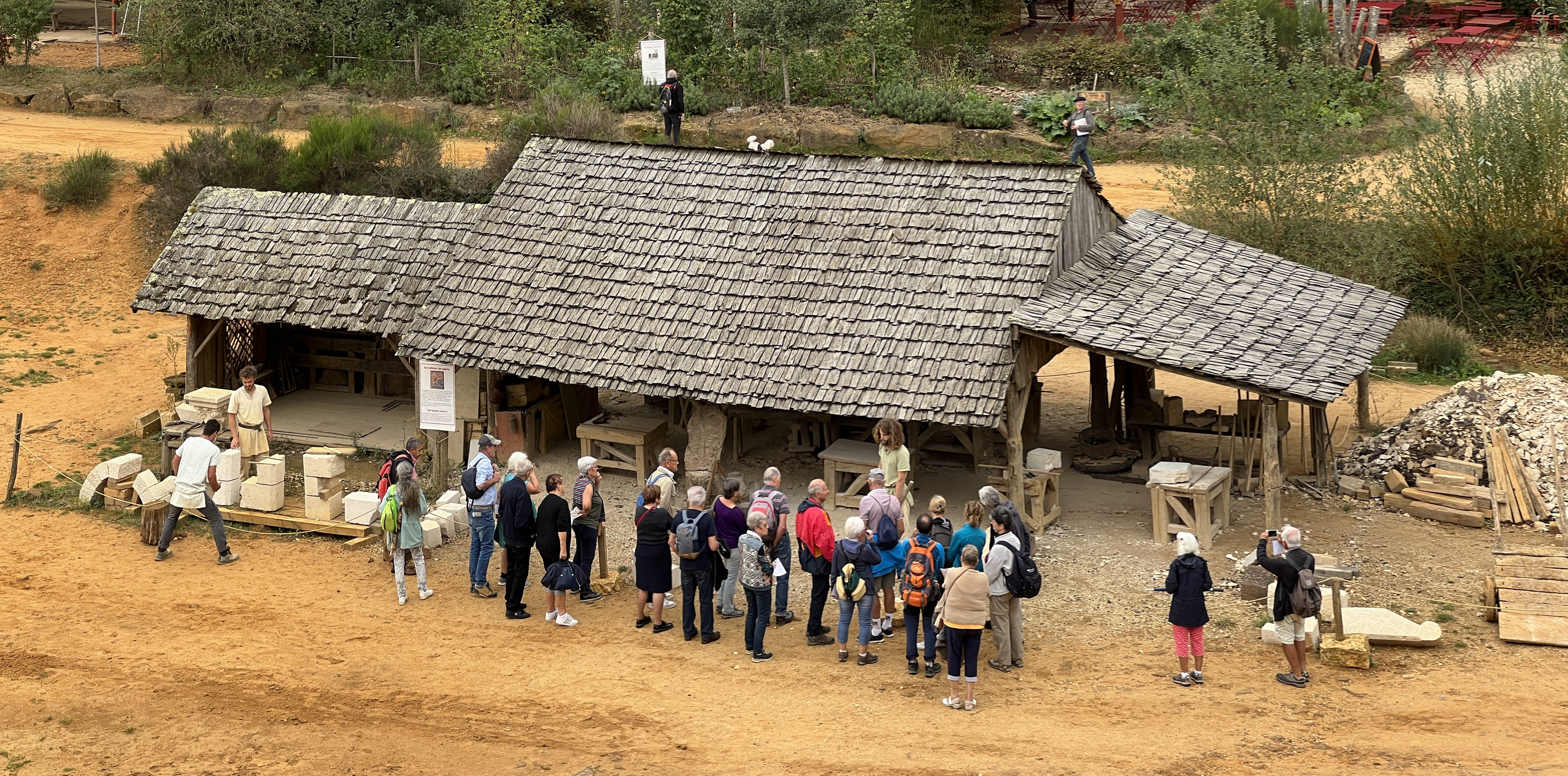
Guédelon site, Treigny-Perreuse-Sainte-Colombe.

== See also ==
- Campus Galli – a comparable project to construct a faithful medieval town with a monastery, based on the Plan of Saint Gall; in Meßkirch, Germany
- Castell Coch – a 19th-century Gothic revival castle
- Castell Henllys – an archeological site accompanied by reconstruction roundhouses
- Ozark Medieval Fortress – another, similar (but halted) castle project in Arkansas, USA
- Castle Drogo – an Edwardian imitation castle in England
- Basilica of Saint-Denis, reassembly of the north tower and its spire entirely financed by the site visits
- French frigate Hermione (2014) – a project to construct a faithful 18th-century frigate
- List of castles in France

== Sources ==
- Durand, Philippe (2005). "Guédelon, construire aujourd'hui un château du XIIIe siècle". Editions Jean-paul Gisserot.
- Minard, Philippe; Folcher, François (2003). Guédelon: des hommes fous, un château fort (in French). Aubanel. ISBN 2700603133.
- Gleyze, Emmanuel (2019). L'Aventure Guédelon: l'édification d'un château médiéval au XXIe siècle (in French). Presses Universitaires de la Méditerranée. ISBN 978-2-36781-287-8.
