= Lead Hill School District =

School district in Arkansas

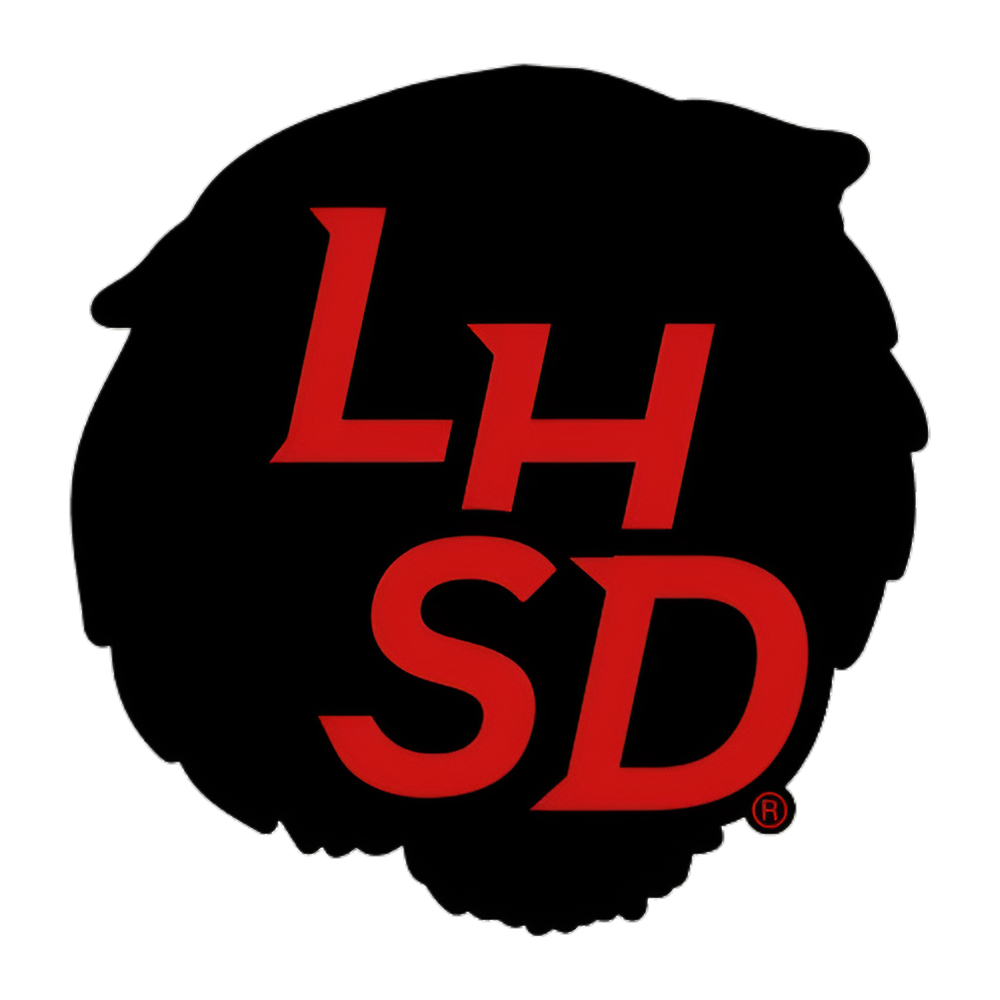
- Alternative Logo

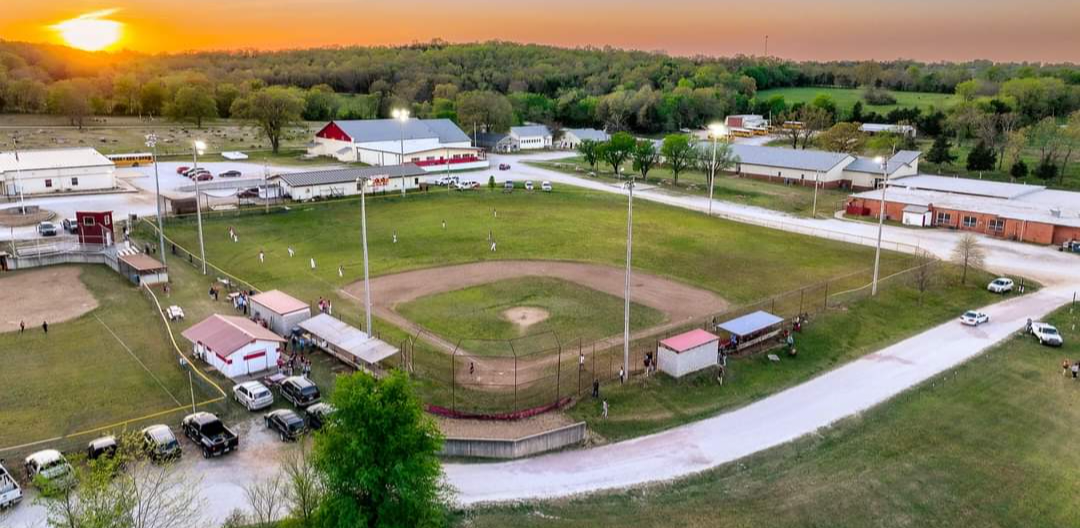

Location
- 6966 Milam Drive; Lead Hill, Arkansas 72644 Lead Hill, Boone, Arkansas; United States
- Coordinates: 36°24′23″N 92°54′30″W

District information
- Motto: Developing Leaders and Learners for Life
- Grades: PK–12
- Established: 1924
- Superintendent: Tami Richey
- Schools: 2
- Budget: $3.2 million (2009–10 academic year)
- NCES District ID: 0503420

Students and staff
- Students: 405 (2010–11)
- Teachers: 36.26 (on FTE basis)
- Staff: 84.26 (on FTE basis)
- Student–teacher ratio: 11.17
- District mascot: Tiger
- Colors: Red and White

Other information
- Website: leadhillschools.net

Lead Hill School District is a public school district in Boone County, Arkansas, United States which serves the cities of Diamond City, Lead Hill and South Lead Hill along with surrounding unincorporated areas within Boone County.

== History ==
Due to the district's small size in 2016, it was in danger of being forcibly consolidated into another district, as consolidation is normally mandated for districts with enrollments each below 350 for two consecutive school years. The district had 338 students and 344 students in the 2016-2017 and 2017-2018 school years. In 2019 the Arkansas Department of Education granted the district a waiver that allowed it to remain independent.

== Schools ==
- Lead Hill High School
- Lead Hill Elementary School

=== Lead Hill High School ===
Lead Hill High School serves seventh through twelfth grades. Based on the 2009-2010 academic year, the total enrollment in the school was 185 and total full-time teachers was 19.30, with a teacher/student ratio of 9.59.

=== Lead Hill Elementary School ===
Lead Hill Elementary School serves preschool through sixth grades. Based on the 2009-2010 academic year, the total enrollment in the school was 213 and total full-time teachers was 23.70, with a teacher/student ratio of 8.99.

== Staffing ==
Based on the 2009-2010 academic year, the total full-time staff of the Lead Hill School District was 88. The total full-time teachers was 43. The total number of non-teaching staff (including 3 administrators) was 45.

== Demographics ==
Within the geographic area covered by the Lead Hill School District, there were 433 individuals under the age of 18, during the 2009-2010 academic year.

== See also ==
- List of school districts in Arkansas
