= Ozark Medieval Fortress =

Unfinished replica castle in Arkansas, U.S.

- Lead Hill, Arkansas, between Springfield, Missouri and Little Rock, Arkansas
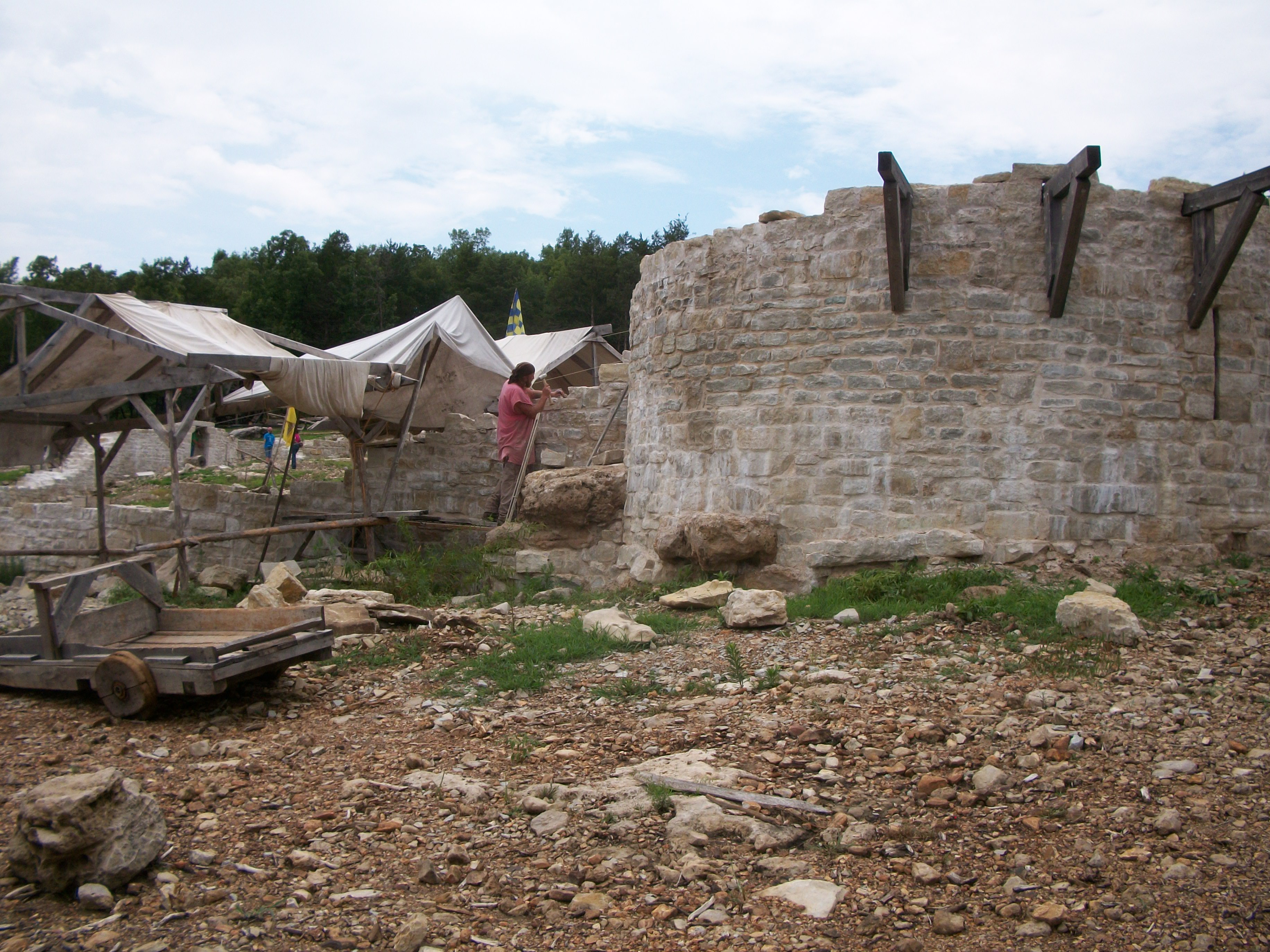
- Ozark Medieval Fortress in 2011

Site information
- Type: Castle
- Owner: Michel Guyot (first owner)
- Open to the public: No
- Condition: Under construction (Paused indefinitely)

Location
- Ozark Medieval Fortress in the United States
- Coordinates: 36.4349389°N 93.0615583°W

Site history
- Built: 2009–January 2012 (originally intended for completion around 2029)
- Materials: Medieval materials: wood, stone, lime

Ozark Medieval Fortress was a project designed to construct an accurate replica of a 13th-century French castle in Lead Hill, Arkansas. Construction was carried out on the site using only materials and techniques appropriate to the 13th century. The ground was broken in 2009, with the expectation that completion would have taken about 20 years.

The project was inspired by Guédelon Castle in France, which is the first attempt to build a medieval castle using accurate construction methods, started by Michel Guyot. Two French citizens living in Arkansas offered to sell Guyot part of their land for the building of a similar fortification. Guyot accepted, and construction began in June 2009.

In May 2010, Ozark Medieval Fortress opened to the public. Visitors had the opportunity to observe the ongoing construction and talk to the costumed workers. Additionally, starting in 2011 a collection of medieval siege weapons was to be on display. The site was open every day from 10AM to 6PM.

In January 2012 the project closed indefinitely, requiring a buyer or an investor. The site is now permanently closed to visitors and only the unfinished ruins of the Ozark Medieval Fortress remain today.

== See also ==
- Guédelon Castle – the original project to build a medieval French castle
