= Lead Hill High School =

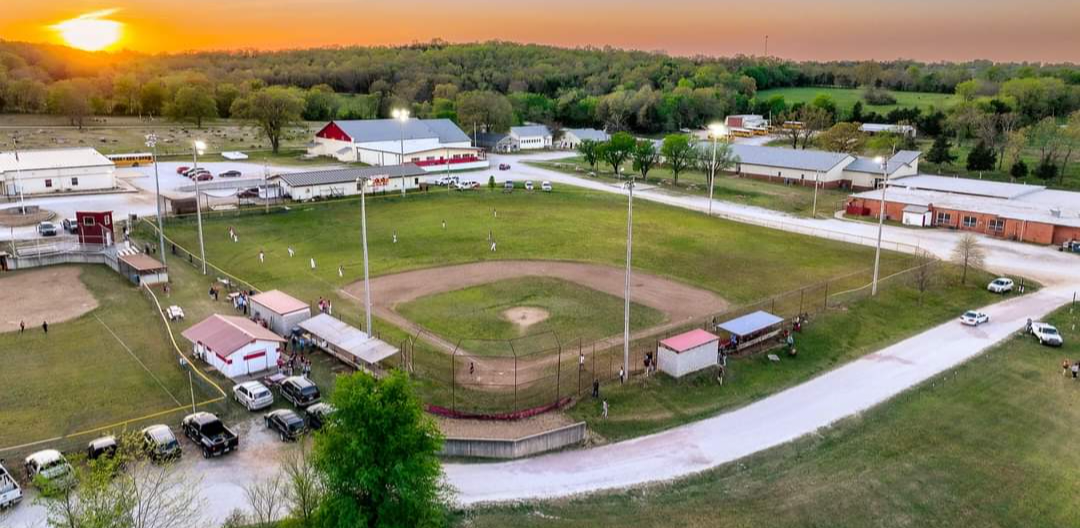
- Aerial view of Lead Hill High School

Location
- 6967 Milum Road; Ozarks; Lead Hill, Boone, Arkansas 72644; United States
- Coordinates: 36°24′23″N 92°54′30″W

Information
- School type: Public comprehensive
- Founded: c. 1924
- Status: Open
- School district: Lead Hill School District
- Superintendent: Tami Richey
- CEEB code: 041375
- NCES School ID: 050342000103
- Principal: Andy Munday
- Teaching staff: 52.03 (on FTE basis)
- Grades: 7–12
- Enrollment: 190 (2022-2023)
- Student to teacher ratio: 3.65
- Education system: ADE Smart Core
- Classes offered: Regular, Advanced Placement (AP), Online (Virtual Arkansas, ect.)
- Colors: Red and white
- Athletics: Yes
- Athletics conference: 1A East
- Sports: Yes
- Mascot: Tiger
- Team name: Lead Hill Tigers
- Accreditation: ADE
- Website: www.leadhillschools.net
- Last updated: January 2024

Lead Hill High School is a comprehensive public high school located in Lead Hill, Arkansas, United States. The school provides secondary education for students in grades 7 through 12 and serves the cities of Diamond City, Lead Hill and South Lead Hill along with surrounding unincorporated areas within Boone County. It is one of nine public high schools in Boone County, Arkansas and the sole high school administered by the Lead Hill School District.

== Academics ==
Lead Hill High School is accredited by the Arkansas Department of Education (ADE) and the assumed course of study follows the Smart Core curriculum developed by the ADE. Students complete regular coursework and exams and may select Advanced Placement (AP) courses and exam with the opportunity to receive college credit. They are located in Lead Hill, in North Central Arkansas nestled along Bull Shoals Lake just 40 minutes south of Branson, Missouri.

== Extracurricular Activities ==
=== Athletics ===
The Lead Hill High School mascot and athletic emblem is the tiger with red and white serving as the school colors.

The Lead Hill Tigers compete in interscholastic activities within the 1A Classification—the state's smallest classification—via the 1A 1 East Conference, as administered by the Arkansas Activities Association. The Tigers field teams in golf (boys/girls), basketball (boys/girls), track and field (boys/girls), baseball, softball, archery (boys/girls), cheer. As of March 2025, the Lead Hill Band has officially joined the AAA, as a part of the Arkansas School Band and Orchestra Association (ASBOA).

=== Programs & Clubs ===
Lead Hill High School offers many programs and Clubs to choose from, though, they may change from time to time. Some programs have been with Lead Hill for decades, and some have gone. Below is a list of programs that the Lead Hill High School has to offer, both formerly and currently (as of March 2025):

- Future Business Leaders of America (FBLA)
- Future Farmers of America (FFA)
- Fellowship of Christian Athletes (FCA)
- Future Homemakers of America (FHA) (Former)
- Literary Arts Guild (Former)
- Art Club
- Drama/Theatre Club
- Concert Band/Marching Band
- Jazz Band/Rock Band
- Junior Executive Training (Former)
- Yearbook Club
- Newspaper Club (Former)
- Key Club (Former)
- Builders Club (Former)
- Choir
- Student Council/Student Ambassadors
