= Rita Riggs =

American costume designer (1930–2017)

- Born: September 2, 1930; Lead Hill, Arkansas
- Died: June 5, 2017 (aged 86); Los Angeles, California
- Education: Santa Ana College, University of Arizona
- Occupation: Costume designer

Rita Riggs (September 2, 1930 – June 5, 2017) was an American costume designer for film and television. She is probably best known for being the costume designer for Norman Lear sitcoms.

== Early life and education ==
Riggs was born in Lead Hill, Arkansas to J. Almus Riggs and Ida V. Keeling. The family moved to Los Angeles in 1943. After two years at Santa Ana College, Riggs went to the University of Arizona to work under costumer Fairfax Proudfit Walkup.

== Career ==
After an interview at NBC in 1954, CBS hired Riggs the next day and her first assignment was in the costume department for Shower of Stars. She also worked on show such as Climax! and Playhouse 90. Riggs later worked on Alfred Hitchcock Presents usually on the wrap-arounds, which led to her work on the Hitchcock films Psycho, and - alongside Edith Head - The Birds and Marnie. She also worked on features such as Seconds, Petulia, Yes, Giorgio, and Divorce American Style, where she first worked for Norman Lear and Bud Yorkin. This led to her work on All in the Family, for which she and production designer Don Roberts created a sepia "family album" look to the show. Along with All in the Family, she also was the costume designer for Maude, Sanford and Son, Good Times, One Day at a Time, Mary Hartman, Mary Hartman and The Jeffersons. Riggs later worked on more films and films for television such as Having Our Say: The Delany Sisters' First 100 Years and also the television series 10,000 Days. She died in Los Angeles in 2017 at the age of 86.

== Awards ==
In 2003, Riggs received the Career Achievement Award in Television from the Costume Designers Guild Awards.
