= Harrison micropolitan area, Arkansas =

Harrison, AR Micropolitan Area
- Micropolitan Statistical Area
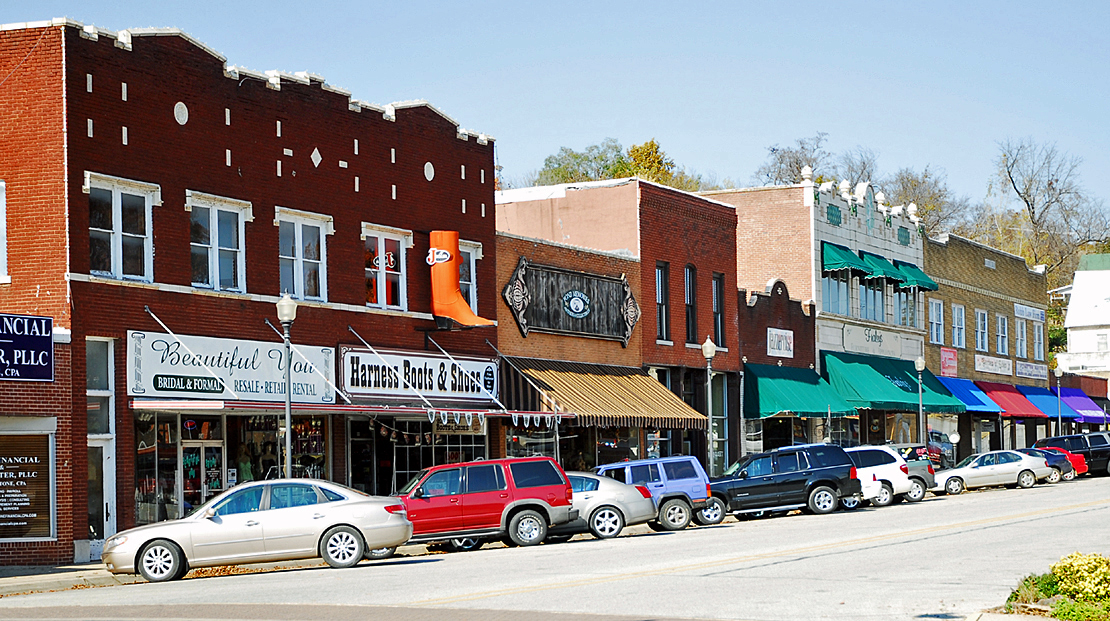
- Historic Downtown Harrison
Interactive Map of Harrison, AR μSA
City of Harrison
Harrison, AR μSA
- Country: United States
- State: Arkansas
- Principal city: Harrison
- Time zone: UTC-6 (CST)
  - Summer (DST): UTC-5 (CDT)

The Harrison Micropolitan Statistical Area, as defined by the United States Census Bureau, is an area consisting of two counties in the U.S. state of Arkansas, anchored by the city of Harrison.

As of the 2010 census, the MSA had a population of 45,223.

== Counties ==
- Boone
- Newton

== Communities ==
=== Places with more than 12,000 inhabitants ===
- Harrison (Principal city)

=== Places with 425 to 800 inhabitants ===
- Diamond City
- Bergman
- Bellefonte
- Jasper

=== Places with 175 to 400 inhabitants ===
- Alpena (partial)
- Western Grove
- Lead Hill
- Omaha

=== Places with less than 175 inhabitants ===
- Valley Springs
- Everton
- Zinc
- South Lead Hill

=== Unincorporated places ===
- Marble Falls
- Olvey

== Demographics ==
As of the census of 2000, there were 42,556 people, 17,351 households, and 12,356 families residing within the MSA. The racial makeup of the MSA was 97.56% White, 0.12% African American, 0.68% Native American, 0.29% Asian, 0.02% Pacific Islander, 0.35% from other races, and 0.99% from two or more races. Hispanic or Latino of any race were 1.06% of the population.

The median income for a household in the MSA was $27,372, and the median income for a family was $32,554. Males had a median income of $24,760 versus $18,442 for females. The per capita income for the MSA was $14,982.

== See also ==
- Arkansas census statistical areas
