= South Lead Hill, Arkansas =

- Town
- Location of South Lead Hill in Boone County, Arkansas.
- Coordinates: 36°23′44″N 92°54′22″W
- Country: United States
- State: Arkansas
- County: Boone

Area
  - Total: 0.16 sq mi (0.42 km^{2})
  - Land: 0.16 sq mi (0.42 km^{2})
  - Water: 0 sq mi (0.00 km^{2})
- Elevation: 860 ft (260 m)

Population (2020)
  - Total: 86
  - Estimate (2025): 81 ▼
  - Density: 525.1/sq mi (202.75/km^{2})
- Time zone: UTC-6 (Central (CST))
  - Summer (DST): UTC-5 (CDT)
- FIPS code: 05-65480
- GNIS feature ID: 2407371

South Lead Hill is a town in Boone County, Arkansas, United States. As of the 2020 census, South Lead Hill had a population of 86. It is part of the Harrison Micropolitan Statistical Area.

== Geography ==
According to the United States Census Bureau, the town has a total area of 0.3 km^{2} (0.1 mi^{2}), all land.

=== Major highway ===
- Arkansas Highway 7

== Demographics ==
Historical population
Census	Pop.	Note	%±
1980	85		—
1990	96		12.9%
2000	88		−8.3%
2010	102		15.9%
2020	86		−15.7%
2025 (est.)	81	▼	−5.8%
U.S. Decennial Census

As of the census of 2000, there were 88 people, 28 households, and 22 families residing in the town. The population density was 261.4/km^{2} (702.4/mi^{2}). There were 33 housing units at an average density of 98.0/km^{2} (263.4/mi^{2}). The racial makeup of the town was 93.18% White, 2.27% Native American, and 4.55% from two or more races. 1.14% of the population were Hispanic or Latino of any race.

There were 28 households, out of which 57.1% had children under the age of 18 living with them, 57.1% were married couples living together, 7.1% had a female householder with no husband present, and 21.4% were non-families. 17.9% of all households were made up of individuals, and 10.7% had someone living alone who was 65 years of age or older. The average household size was 3.14 and the average family size was 3.55.

In the town, the population was spread out, with 38.6% under the age of 18, 8.0% from 18 to 24, 31.8% from 25 to 44, 15.9% from 45 to 64, and 5.7% who were 65 years of age or older. The median age was 26 years. For every 100 females, there were 104.7 males. For every 100 females age 18 and over, there were 92.9 males.

The median income for a household in the town was $30,625, and the median income for a family was $41,250. Males had a median income of $28,250 versus $15,000 for females. The per capita income for the town was $15,724. There were no families and 14.9% of the population living below the poverty line, including no under eighteens and none of those over 64.

== Education ==
Public education for elementary and secondary students is provided to South Lead Hill, along with Lead Hill and Diamond City by the Lead Hill School District, which leads to graduation from Lead Hill High School.
