= Lead Hill, Arkansas =

- Town
- Location of Lead Hill in Boone County, Arkansas.
- Coordinates: 36°24′49″N 92°54′24″W
- Country: United States
- State: Arkansas
- County: Boone
- Established: December 8, 1915

Government
  - Type: Council government

Area
  - Total: 0.66 sq mi (1.72 km^{2})
  - Land: 0.58 sq mi (1.50 km^{2})
  - Water: 0.085 sq mi (0.22 km^{2})
- Elevation: 699 ft (213 m)

Population (2020)
  - Total: 274
  - Estimate (2025): 272 ▼
  - Density: 473.9/sq mi (182.99/km^{2})
- Time zone: UTC-6 (Central (CST))
  - Summer (DST): UTC-5 (CDT)
- ZIP codes: 72630, 72644
- Area code: 870
- FIPS code: 05-39040
- GNIS feature ID: 2405994
- Website: www.leadhill.net

Lead Hill is a town in Boone County, Arkansas, United States. As of the 2020 census, Lead Hill had a population of 274. It is part of the Harrison Micropolitan Statistical Area.

== History ==
Lead Hill was named from valuable deposits of lead in the vicinity.

The unfinished ruins of the Ozark Medieval Fortress, built between 2009-2012, are located in Lead Hill.

== Geography ==
According to the United States Census Bureau, the town has a total area of 0.5 square miles (1.3 km^{2}), of which 0.5 square miles (1.3 km^{2}) is land and 0.1 square miles (0.26 km^{2}) (12.96%) is water.

=== Major highways ===
- Arkansas Highway 7
- Arkansas Highway 14

== Demographics ==
Historical population
Census	Pop.	Note	%±
1880	253		—
1890	333		31.6%
1920	218		—
1930	268		22.9%
1940	194		−27.6%
1950	110		−43.3%
1960	102		−7.3%
1970	143		40.2%
1980	247		72.7%
1990	283		14.6%
2000	287		1.4%
2010	271		−5.6%
2020	274		1.1%
2025 (est.)	272	▲	−0.7%
U.S. Decennial Census

As of the census of 2000, there were 287 people, 126 households, and 86 families residing in the town. The population density was 605.2 inhabitants per square mile (233.7/km^{2}). There were 144 housing units at an average density of 303.7 per square mile (117.3/km^{2}). The racial makeup of the town was 96.86% White, 0.35% Asian, and 2.79% from two or more races. 0.35% of the population were Hispanic or Latino of any race.

There were 126 households, out of which 28.6% had children under the age of 18 living with them, 57.1% were married couples living together, 10.3% had a female householder with no husband present, and 31.7% were non-families. 27.8% of all households were made up of individuals, and 18.3% had someone living alone who was 65 years of age or older. The average household size was 2.28 and the average family size was 2.78.

In the town, the population was spread out, with 23.7% under the age of 18, 3.8% from 18 to 24, 24.7% from 25 to 44, 22.0% from 45 to 64, and 25.8% who were 65 years of age or older. The median age was 43 years. For every 100 females, there were 90.1 males. For every 100 females age 18 and over, there were 79.5 males.

The median income for a household in the town was $30,625, and the median income for a family was $32,500. Males had a median income of $24,375 versus $18,864 for females. The per capita income for the town was $13,051. About 9.3% of families and 15.7% of the population were below the poverty line, including 23.4% of those under the age of eighteen and 12.8% of those 65 or over.

== Education ==
Lead Hill, along with South Lead Hill and Diamond City, is within the Lead Hill School District, which leads to graduation from Lead Hill High School.

== Climate ==
Due to its elevation, northerly latitude, and surrounding topography, Lead Hill often experiences the lowest minimum temperatures in the state during Arkansas's cooler months. This distinction, though, is often shared with the small Buffalo River hamlet of Gilbert.

Climate data for Lead Hill, Arkansas (1991–2020 normals, extremes 1927–present)
Month	Jan	Feb	Mar	Apr	May	Jun	Jul	Aug	Sep	Oct	Nov	Dec	Year
Record high °F (°C)	83 (28)	88 (31)	95 (35)	94 (34)	102 (39)	107 (42)	115 (46)	116 (47)	110 (43)	101 (38)	87 (31)	86 (30)	116 (47)
Mean maximum °F (°C)	69.6 (20.9)	72.7 (22.6)	80.2 (26.8)	84.0 (28.9)	88.1 (31.2)	93.1 (33.9)	97.5 (36.4)	98.0 (36.7)	93.6 (34.2)	86.1 (30.1)	76.4 (24.7)	70.1 (21.2)	99.6 (37.6)
Mean daily maximum °F (°C)	44.5 (6.9)	49.1 (9.5)	58.3 (14.6)	67.6 (19.8)	74.9 (23.8)	83.4 (28.6)	87.8 (31.0)	87.4 (30.8)	80.5 (26.9)	69.7 (20.9)	57.5 (14.2)	47.2 (8.4)	67.3 (19.6)
Daily mean °F (°C)	33.7 (0.9)	37.5 (3.1)	46.3 (7.9)	55.5 (13.1)	64.3 (17.9)	73.1 (22.8)	77.4 (25.2)	76.2 (24.6)	68.7 (20.4)	57.3 (14.1)	46.1 (7.8)	36.8 (2.7)	56.1 (13.4)
Mean daily minimum °F (°C)	22.9 (−5.1)	25.9 (−3.4)	34.2 (1.2)	43.3 (6.3)	53.6 (12.0)	62.8 (17.1)	66.9 (19.4)	65.0 (18.3)	56.9 (13.8)	45.0 (7.2)	34.7 (1.5)	26.4 (−3.1)	44.8 (7.1)
Mean minimum °F (°C)	4.4 (−15.3)	8.0 (−13.3)	15.6 (−9.1)	26.4 (−3.1)	37.1 (2.8)	50.8 (10.4)	56.5 (13.6)	53.0 (11.7)	40.8 (4.9)	27.3 (−2.6)	18.0 (−7.8)	10.8 (−11.8)	1.0 (−17.2)
Record low °F (°C)	−28 (−33)	−21 (−29)	−14 (−26)	12 (−11)	28 (−2)	39 (4)	42 (6)	42 (6)	28 (−2)	14 (−10)	4 (−16)	−12 (−24)	−28 (−33)
Average precipitation inches (mm)	2.89 (73)	2.75 (70)	4.66 (118)	5.18 (132)	5.11 (130)	3.85 (98)	4.19 (106)	3.23 (82)	4.09 (104)	3.97 (101)	4.26 (108)	3.24 (82)	47.42 (1,204)
Average snowfall inches (cm)	2.6 (6.6)	2.3 (5.8)	2.1 (5.3)	0.0 (0.0)	0.0 (0.0)	0.0 (0.0)	0.0 (0.0)	0.0 (0.0)	0.0 (0.0)	0.0 (0.0)	0.1 (0.25)	1.1 (2.8)	8.2 (21)
Average precipitation days (≥ 0.01 in)	7.5	7.0	10.2	9.4	11.3	9.1	8.4	8.3	7.3	8.0	8.3	7.7	102.5
Average snowy days (≥ 0.1 in)	1.6	1.0	0.6	0.0	0.0	0.0	0.0	0.0	0.0	0.0	0.1	0.4	3.7
Source: NOAA

== Points of interest ==
Ozark Medieval Fortress

Bull Shoals Lake

Lead Hill is located near Branson, Missouri and Diamond City.

== Notable people ==
- Rita Riggs (1930-2017), costume designer
- Kaleb Moon, TV actor
