= Diamond City, Arkansas =

- City
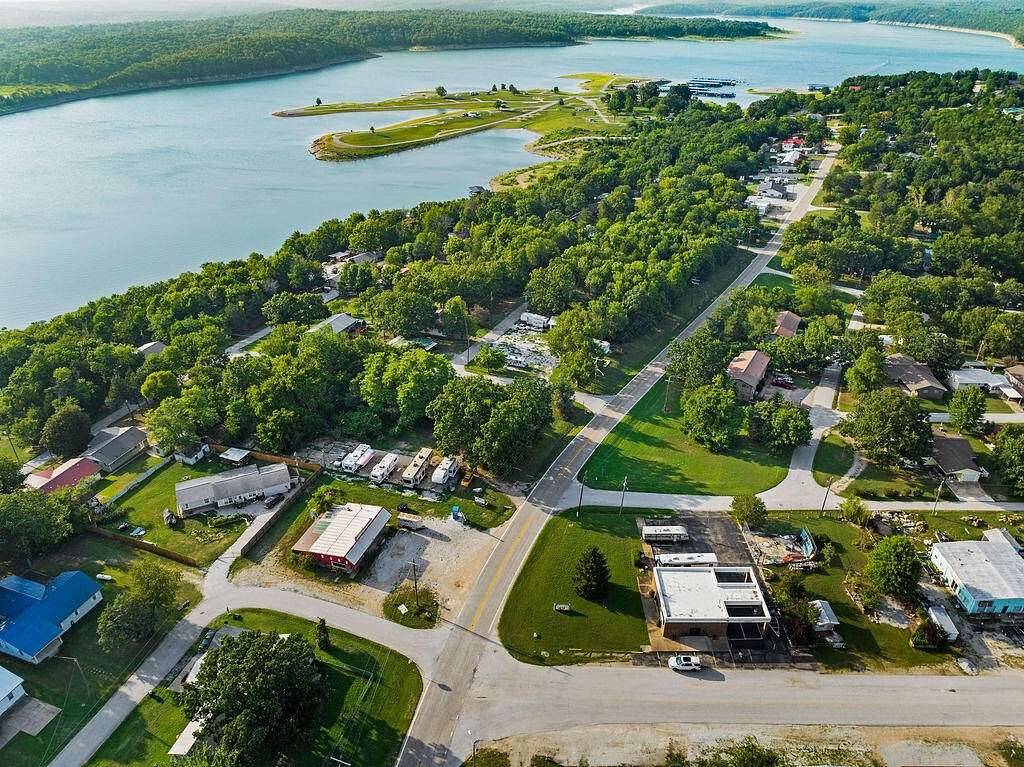
- Diamond City, AR

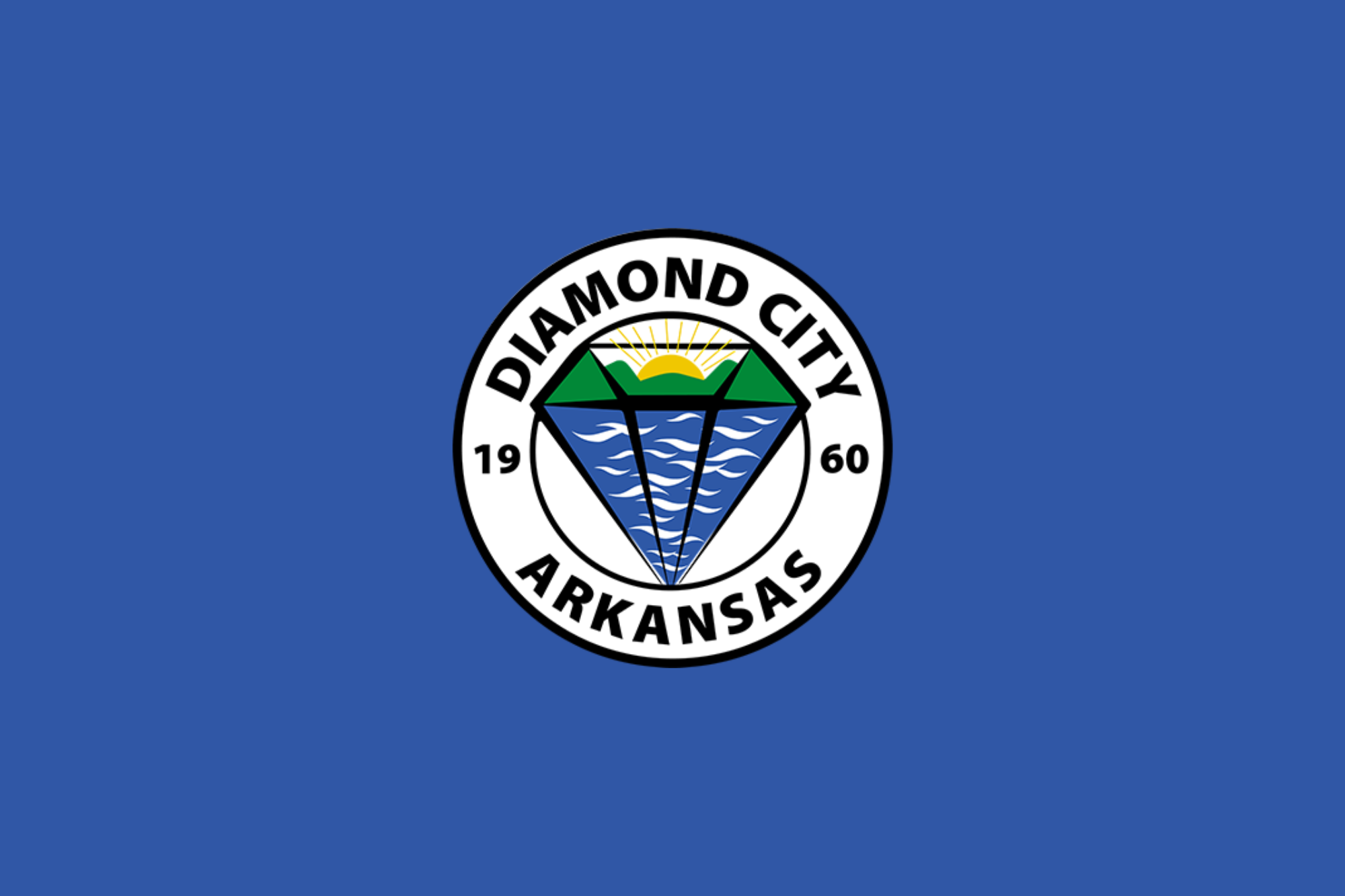
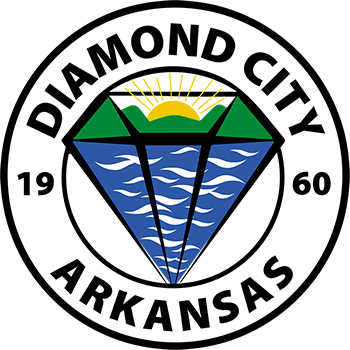
- Flag Seal

- Location of Diamond City in Boone County, Arkansas.
- Coordinates: 36°27′27″N 92°54′47″W
- Country: United States
- State: Arkansas
- County: Boone
- Established: June 7, 1960

Government
  - Type: Council government
  - Mayor: Jacob Glidewell

Area
  - Total: 2.82 sq mi (7.30 km^{2})
  - Land: 2.82 sq mi (7.30 km^{2})
  - Water: 0 sq mi (0.00 km^{2})
- Elevation: 827 ft (252 m)

Population (2020)
  - Total: 757
  - Estimate (2025): 861 ▲
  - Density: 268.7/sq mi (103.75/km^{2})
- Time zone: UTC-6 (Central (CST))
  - Summer (DST): UTC-5 (CDT)
- ZIP code: 72630
- Area code: 870
- FIPS code: 05-18850
- GNIS feature ID: 2404224
- Website: diamondcityar.gov

Diamond City is a city in northeast Boone County, Arkansas, United States. The population was 757 at the 2020 census. It is part of the Harrison micropolitan area.

== Geography ==
Diamond City is located on the south shore of Bull Shoals Lake between east and west Sugarloaf Creeks. The community of Lead Hill lies two miles south on Route 7.

According to the United States Census Bureau, the city has a total area of 2.68 square miles (6.9 km^{2}), all of it land.

=== Major highway ===
- Arkansas Highway 7

Arkansas State Highway 7 reaches its northern terminus at Bull Shoals Lake at the northern edge of Diamond City at a state maintained park and privately owned marinas.

== Demographics ==
Historical population
| Census | Pop. | Note | %± |
|---|---|---|---|
| 1970 | 282 | | — |
| 1980 | 650 | | 130.5% |
| 1990 | 601 | | −7.5% |
| 2000 | 730 | | 21.5% |
| 2010 | 782 | | 7.1% |
| 2020 | 757 | | −3.2% |
| 2025 (est.) | 861 | ▲ | 13.7% |
U.S. Decennial Census

=== 2020 census ===
Diamond City racial composition
| Race | Number | Percentage |
|---|---|---|
| White (non-Hispanic) | 682 | 90.09% |
| Native American | 11 | 1.45% |
| Asian | 4 | 0.53% |
| Pacific Islander | 2 | 0.26% |
| Other/Mixed | 37 | 4.89% |
| Hispanic or Latino | 21 | 2.77% |

As of the 2020 United States census, there were 757 people, 459 households, and 288 families residing in the city.

=== 2000 census ===
As of the census of the year 2000, there were 730 people, 346 households, and 235 families residing in the city. The population density was 272.9 inhabitants per square mile (105.4/km^{2}). There were 547 housing units at an average density of 204.5 per square mile (79.0/km^{2}). The racial makeup of the city was 96.71% White, 0.55% Native American, and 2.74% from two or more races. 1.37% of the population were Hispanic or Latino of any race.

There were 346 households, out of which 13.9% had children under the age of 18 living with them, 63.3% were married couples living together, 3.8% had a female householder with no husband present, and 31.8% were non-families. 28.9% of all households were made up of individuals, and 17.1% had someone living alone who was 65 years of age or older. The average household size was 2.11 and the average family size was 2.55.

In the city, the population was spread out, with 15.3% under the age of 18, 4.0% from 18 to 24, 19.2% from 25 to 44, 32.2% from 45 to 64, and 29.3% who were 65 years of age or older. The median age was 54 years. For every 100 females, there were 101.7 males. For every 100 females age 18 and over, there were 100.6 males.

The median income for a household in the city was $23,704, and the median income for a family was $27,946. Males had a median income of $24,659 versus $17,708 for females. The per capita income for the city was $13,968. About 16.2% of families and 18.8% of the population were below the poverty line, including 35.0% of those under age 18 and 7.2% of those age 65 or over.

== Education ==
Diamond City, along with Lead Hill and South Lead Hill, is within the Lead Hill School District, which leads to graduation from Lead Hill High School.

== Climate ==
The climate in this area is characterized by hot, humid summers and generally mild to cool winters. According to the Köppen Climate Classification system, Diamond City has a humid subtropical climate, abbreviated "Cfa" on climate maps.
