= List of places in Arkansas: E =

Arkansas State Seal

This list of current cities, towns, unincorporated communities, and other recognized places in the U.S. state of Arkansas whose name begins with the letter E. It also includes information on the number and names of counties in which the place lies, and its lower and upper zip code bounds, if applicable.

== Cities and Towns ==
Name of place	Number of counties	Principal county	Lower zip code	Upper zip code
Eagle Mills	1	Ouachita County	71720	
Eagletie	1	Dallas County		
Eagleton	1	Polk County	71953	
Earle	1	Crittenden County	72331	
Earl Prairie	1	Logan County		
Earnharts	1	Independence County		
Earnheart	1	Independence County		
East Black Oak	1	Crittenden County	72386	
East Camden	1	Calhoun County		
East Camden	1	Ouachita County	71701	
East End	1	Saline County	72065	
East Little Rock	1	Pulaski County		
East Pocahontas	1	Randolph County	72455	
Eastport	1	Little River County		
East Richwoods	1	Stone County	72560	
Eastview	1	Mississippi County		
East Wilson	1	Mississippi County	72395	
Eaton	1	Lawrence County		
Ebenezer	1	Columbia County	71764	
Ebony	1	Crittenden County	72364	
Echo	1	Logan County	72927	
Economy	1	Pope County	72823	
Eden	1	Monroe County		
Eden Isle	1	Cleburne County	72543	
Edgemont	1	Cleburne County	72044	
Edmondson	1	Crittenden County	72332	
Edmonson	1	Independence County		
Edna	1	Johnson County		
Edwards	1	Prairie County		
Edwards Junction	1	Newton County		
Efay	1	Washington County	72701	
Eglantine	1	Van Buren County	72153	
Egypt	1	Craighead County	72427	
Elaine	1	Phillips County	72333	
Elba	1	Van Buren County		
Elberta	1	Howard County		
Elberta	1	Searcy County	72645	
Elberta	1	Yell County		
El Dorado	1	Union County	71730	
Elevenpoint	1	Randolph County	72455	
Elgin	1	Jackson County		
Elizabeth	1	Fulton County	72531	
Elkhorn Tavern	1	Benton County		
Elkins	1	Mississippi County		
Elkins	1	Washington County	72727	
Elkins Park	1	Randolph County		
Elk Ranch	1	Carroll County	72632	
Elliott	1	Ouachita County		
Ellis	1	Baxter County	72653	
Ellis Chapel	1	Cross County		
Ellison	1	Jefferson County	72152	
Elm	1	Clark County	71921	
Elm Grove	1	Craighead County	72437	
Elmo	1	Independence County		
Elm Park	1	Scott County	72927	
Elm Springs	2	Washington County	72728	
Elm Springs	2	Benton County	72728	
Elm Store	1	Randolph County	65778	
Elmwood	1	Boone County		
Elmwood	1	Chicot County		
Elmwood	1	Jefferson County		
Elnora	1	Randolph County	72455	
El Paso	1	White County	72045	
Emanuel	1	Arkansas County	72003	
Emerson	1	Columbia County	71740	
Eminence	1	Chicot County		
Emmet	2	Hempstead County	71835	
Emmet	2	Nevada County	71835	
Emmons	1	Monroe County		
Emon	1	Columbia County		
Empire	1	Chicot County	71661	
Enders	1	Faulkner County	72131	
Engelberg	1	Randolph County	72455	
England	1	Lonoke County	72046	
England Junction	1	Jefferson County	72004	
English	1	Jefferson County	72004	
Enola	1	Faulkner County	72047	
Enon	1	Drew County		
Enright	1	White County	72143	
Enterprise	1	Sebastian County	72906	
Erbie	1	Newton County	72648	
Eros	1	Marion County	72633	
Erwin	1	Jackson County	72112	
Erwin	1	Prairie County	72040	
Estes	1	Pulaski County	72046	
Estico	1	Jackson County		
Ethel	1	Arkansas County	72048	
Etna	1	Franklin County	72949	
Etowah	1	Mississippi County	72428	
Euclid	1	Howard County		
Euclid Heights	1	Garland County	71901	
Eudora	1	Chicot County	71640	
Eula	1	Searcy County	72676	
Eureka Springs	1	Carroll County	72632	
Evadale	1	Mississippi County		
Evansville	1	Washington County	72729	
Evening Shade	1	Sharp County	72532	
Evening Star	1	Greene County	72425	
Everton	1	Boone County	72633	
Ewal	1	Phillips County		
Excelsior	1	Sebastian County	72936	
Experiment	1	Columbia County		

== Townships ==
Name of place	Number of counties	Principal county	Lower zip code	Upper zip code
Eagle Township	1	Bradley County		
Eagle Township	1	Faulkner County		
Eagle Township	1	Lonoke County		
Eagle Township	1	Pike County		
Eagle Township	1	Polk County		
East Fork Township	1	Faulkner County		
East Griggs Township	1	Van Buren County		
East Roanoke Township	1	Randolph County		
East Sullivan Township	1	Sharp County		
Eaton Township	1	Lawrence County		
Ecore Fabre Township	1	Ouachita County		
Egypt Township	1	Ashley County		
Eldorado Township	1	Benton County		
El Dorado Township	1	Union County		
Eleven Point Township	1	Randolph County		
Elixir Township	1	Boone County		
Elkins Township	1	Washington County		
Ellis Township	1	Cross County		
Ellsworth Township	1	Logan County		
Elm Springs Township	1	Washington County		
Elm Store Township	1	Randolph County		
Elon Township	1	Ashley County		
El Paso Township	1	White County		
Emerson Township	1	Columbia County		
Emmet Township	1	Nevada County		
Enola Township	1	Faulkner County		
Esculapia Township	1	Benton County		
Evening Shade Township	1	Greene County		
Ewing Township	1	Boone County		
Extra Township	1	Ashley County		
