= Long Creek Township, Arkansas =

Long Creek Township, Arkansas may refer to:

- Long Creek Township, Boone County, Arkansas
- Long Creek Township, Carroll County, Arkansas
- Long Creek Township, Searcy County, Arkansas

== See also ==
- List of townships in Arkansas
- Long Creek Township (disambiguation)
