= Arkansas Highway 397 =

State highway in Arkansas, United States

Highway 397

Route information
- Maintained by ArDOT
- Length: 2.023 mi (3.256 km)
- Existed: April 25, 1973–present

Major junctions
- South end: AR 43 at Grubb Springs
- North end: Industrial Park Road in Harrison

Location
- Country: United States
- State: Arkansas
- Counties: Boone

Highway system
- Arkansas Highway System; Interstate; US; State; Business; Spurs; Suffixed; Scenic; Heritage
← AR 396	→ AR 398

Highway 397 (AR 397 and Hwy. 397) is a north-south state highway in Boone County, Arkansas. The highway is maintained by the Arkansas Department of Transportation.

== Route description ==
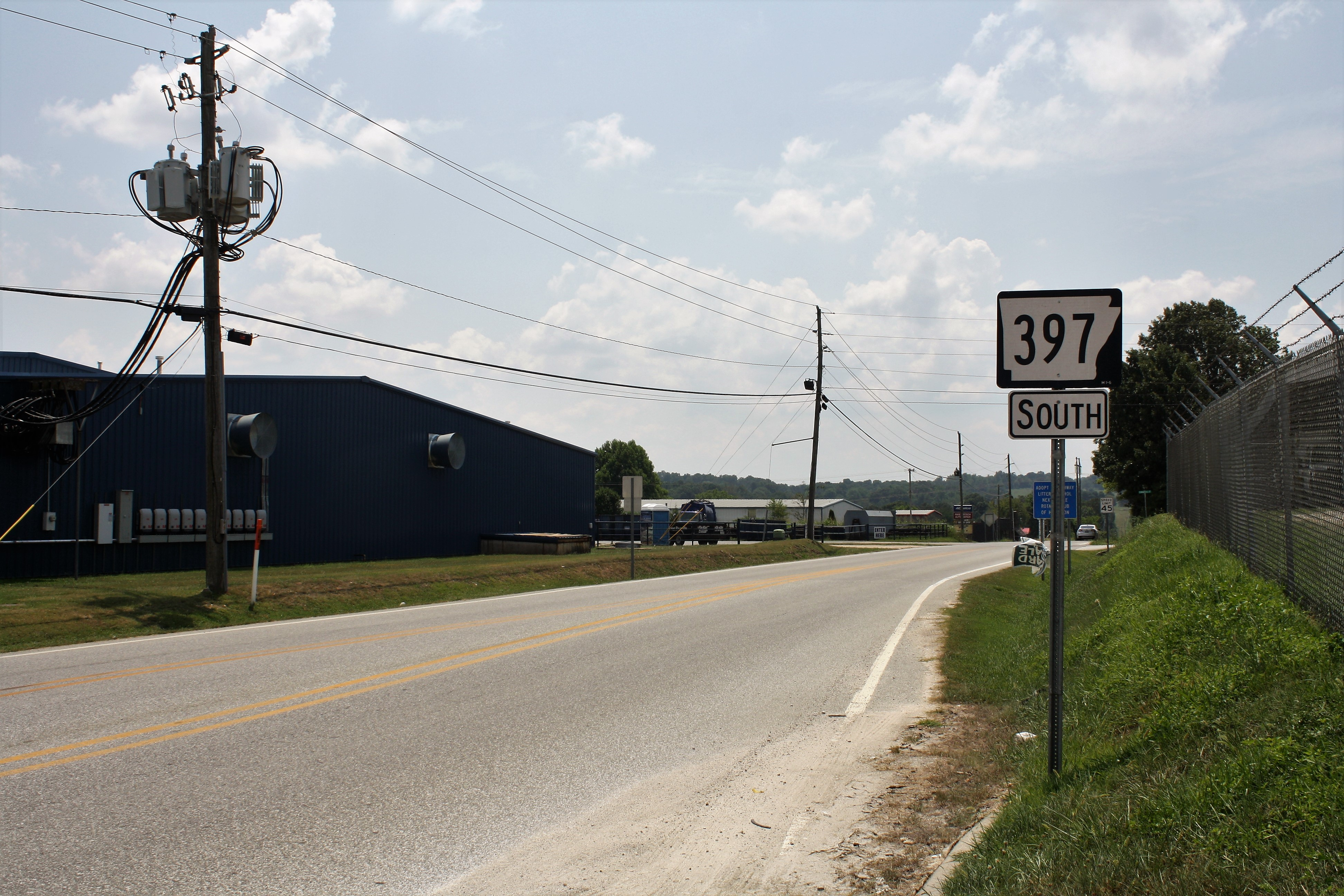
First reasssurance marker for Highway 397 southbound from the northern terminus

The ArDOT maintains Highway 397 like all other parts of the state highway system. As a part of these responsibilities, the Department tracks the volume of traffic using its roads in surveys using a metric called average annual daily traffic (AADT). ArDOT estimates the traffic level for a segment of roadway for any average day of the year in these surveys. As of 2019, AADT was estimated at 4,500 vehicles per day (VPD) along the northern part and 2,200 VPD near the southern terminus. No segment of Highway 397 has been listed as part of the National Highway System, a network of roads important to the nation's economy, defense, and mobility.

The Highway 397 designation begins at a junction with Highway 43 in the Ozark Mountains just outside Harrison, the county seat of Boone County, Arkansas. Highway 397 passes the Grubb Springs School, listed on the National Register of Historic Places and runs through a rural area before crossing Dry Branch and briefly serving as the western city limits of Harrison. Highway 397 next intersects Highway 392; the two highways form a brief concurrency westbound along a section line road. Highway 397 turns north alone, crossing Dry Jordan Creek and again serving as the western boundary of Harrison. The highway enters an industrial area of Harrison before terminating at Industrial Park Road, a city street.

== History ==
In 1973, the Arkansas General Assembly passed Act 9 of 1973. The act directed county judges and legislators to designate up to 12 miles (19 km) of county roads as state highways in each county. As a result of this legislation, Highway 397 was created between Highway 43 and Industrial Park Road in Harrison by the Arkansas State Highway Commission on April 25, 1973.

== Major intersections ==
The entire route is in Boone County.

Location	mi	km	Destinations	Notes
Grubb Springs	0.000	0.000	AR 43	Southern terminus
	1.02– 1.20	1.64– 1.93	AR 392 – Harrison, Capps, Batavia	
Harrison	2.023	3.256	Industrial Park Road	Northern terminus
1.000 mi = 1.609 km; 1.000 km = 0.621 mi: Concurrency terminus
