= Arkansas Highway 281 =

Highway in Arkansas

Highway 281

Route information
- Maintained by ArDOT
- Length: 12.292 mi (19.782 km)
- Existed: April 24, 1963–present

Major junctions
- South end: AR 7 near Bergman
- North end: Bull Shoals Lake

Location
- Country: United States
- State: Arkansas
- Counties: Boone

Highway system
- Arkansas Highway System; Interstate; US; State; Business; Spurs; Suffixed; Scenic; Heritage
← AR 280	→ AR 282

Highway 281 (AR 281, Ark. 281, and Hwy. 281) is a state highway in Boone County, Arkansas. The route begins at Highway 7 near Bergman and runs north to Bull Shoals Lake. The route is maintained by the Arkansas Department of Transportation (ArDOT).

== Route description ==
In Boone County, in the Ozark Mountains, Highway 281 begins at an intersection with Highway 7 north of Bergman. The route winds north through a sparsely populated area, passing through the unincorporated community of Boone. A brief concurrency with Highway 14 begins in northern Boone County. After the overlap, Highway 281 turns north and runs to Tucker Hollow Park on Bull Shoals Lake, where the route terminates.

== History ==
The route was created by the Arkansas State Highway Commission on April 24, 1963 between Highway 14 and Bull Shoals Lake. It was extended south to Bergman on November 23, 1966.

== Major intersections ==
Mile markers reset at concurrencies. The entire route is in Boone County.

Location	mi	km	Destinations	Notes
	0.000	0.000	AR 7 (Scenic 7 Byway) – Lead Hill, Harrison	
	9.768– 0.000	15.720– 0.000	AR 14 – Omaha, Lead Hill	
Bull Shoals Lake	2.524	4.062	End state maintenance	
1.000 mi = 1.609 km; 1.000 km = 0.621 mi: Concurrency terminus

== See also ==
- List of state highways in Arkansas
