= Grubb Springs School =

- U.S. National Register of Historic Places
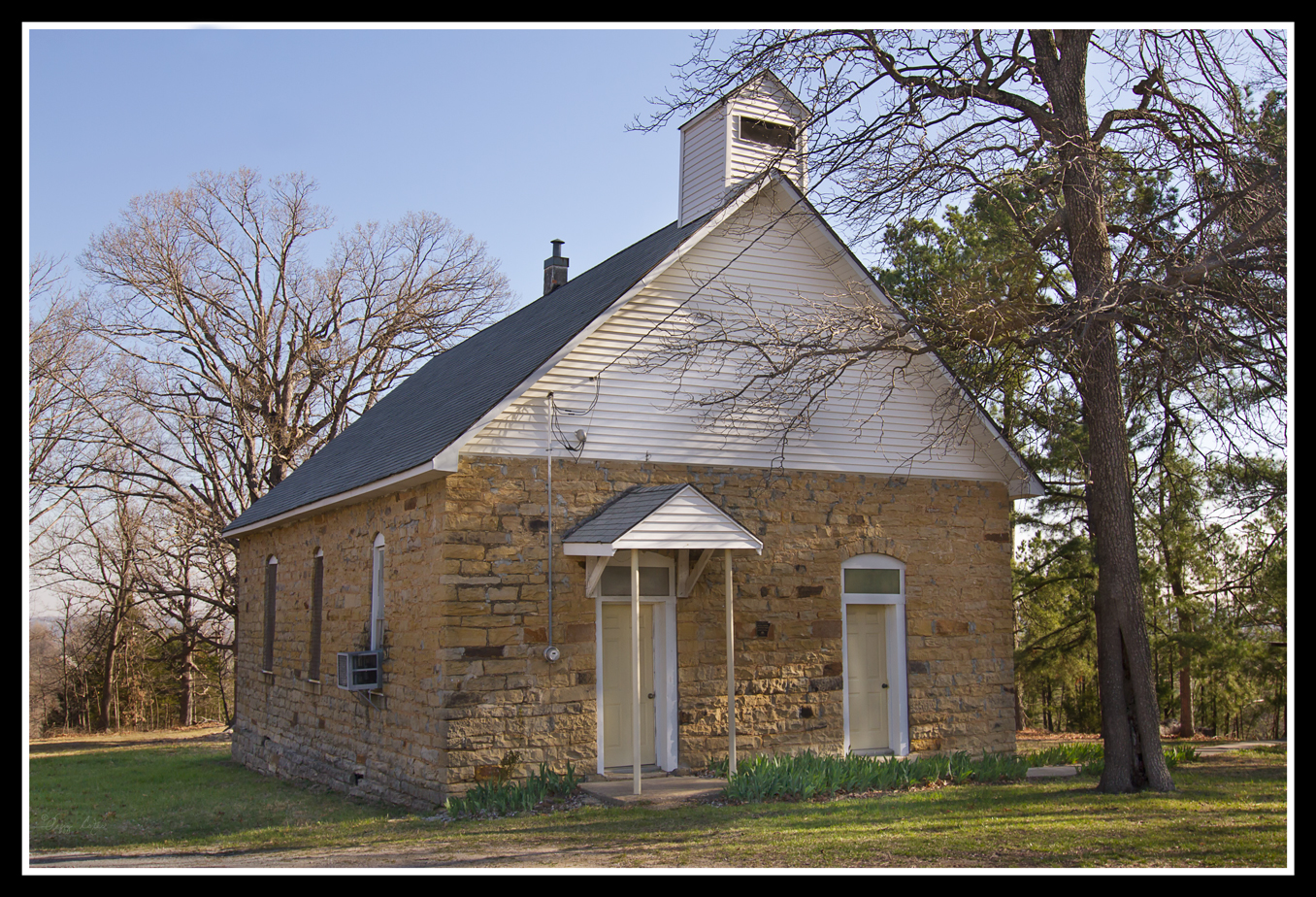

- Location within Arkansas Location within the United States
- Nearest city: Northeastern corner of the junction of Highways 43 and 397, near Harrison, Arkansas
- Coordinates: 36°13′12″N 93°8′59″W
- Area: 3 acres (1.2 ha)
- Built: 1892
- Architectural style: Ozark Stone
- NRHP reference No.: 96000329
- Added to NRHP: March 29, 1996

The Grubb Springs Community Building, formerly the Grubb Springs School, is a historic school building in Boone County, Arkansas. The building is a single-story stone gable-roofed structure located northeast of the junction of Arkansas Highways 43 and 397, west of Harrison. Construction began on the building in 1892 by the local Methodist congregation, intending its use as a church. The land and unfinished building were sold in 1896 to the local school district, which completed the building. It was used as a school until 1944, and has since been converted into a community center.

The building was listed on the National Register of Historic Places in 1996. It was deemed significant as a surviving stone one-room schoolhouse example.

== See also ==
- National Register of Historic Places listings in Boone County, Arkansas
