= Alpena High School =

Alpena High School may refer to:

== In the United States ==
- Alpena High School (Arkansas), Alpena, Arkansas
- Alpena High School (South Dakota), Alpena, South Dakota (closed)
- Alpena High School (Michigan), Alpena, Michigan
