= Arkansas Highway 392 =

State highway in Arkansas, United States

Highway 392

Route information
- Maintained by ArDOT
- Length: 10.44 mi (16.80 km)
- Existed: April 24, 1963–present

Major junctions
- West end: US 62 / US 412 at Little Arkansaw
- East end: AR 7 in Harrison

Location
- Country: United States
- State: Arkansas
- Counties: Boone

Highway system
- Arkansas Highway System; Interstate; US; State; Business; Spurs; Suffixed; Scenic; Heritage
← AR 391	→ AR 393

Highway 392 (also called AR 392 and Hwy. 392) is a 10.44-mile (16.80 km) state highway in the Ozark Mountains in northern Arkansas. The highway runs from U.S. Highway 62 (US 62) and US 412 in Little Arkansaw east to AR 7 in Harrison. The route is located entirely in Boone County, and also serves the communities of Batavia and Capps. AR 392 is maintained by the Arkansas Department of Transportation.

The highway is included in the Arkansas Heritage Trails System; designated as part of the Trail of Tears (Benge Route).

== Route description ==
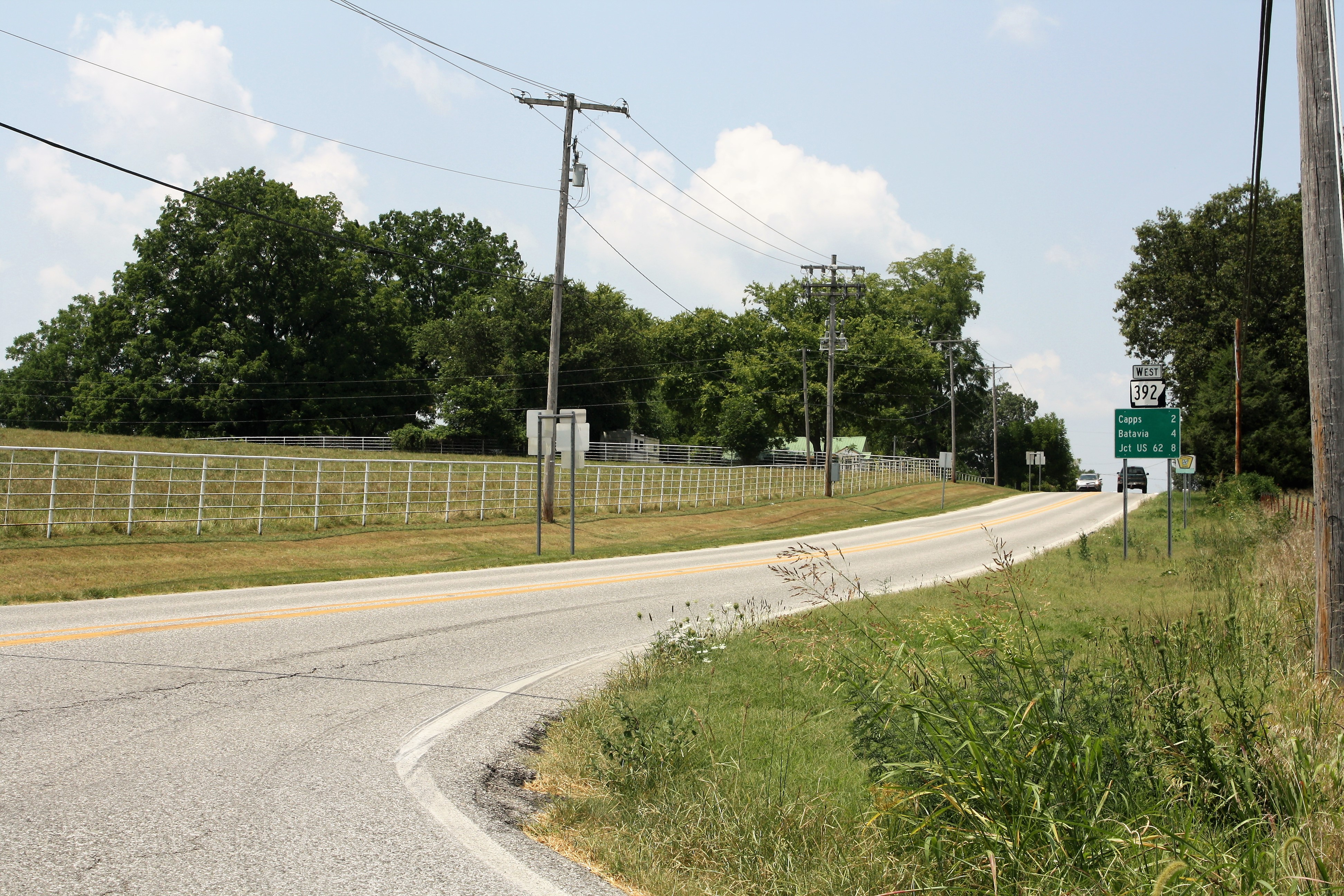
First reassurance marker west of the Highway 397 junction

AR 392 begins at an intersection with US 62 and US 412 at Little Arkansaw, 3.2 miles (5.1 km) east of Alpena. From here the route heads south, leaving Little Arkansaw and heading through a rural area. The highway turns southeast to pass through Batavia; past the community, it briefly heads south before turning eastward. After passing through Capps, the road crosses the Dry Jordan Creek before meeting northbound AR 397. The two highways are briefly concurrent before AR 397 turns south; AR 392 continues eastward toward Harrison as Capps Road. In Harrison, the route enters a residential area before curving southeast toward Stephenson Avenue. It follows Stephenson Avenue east for two blocks before turning south into a business district on Pine Street. After following Pine Street for a block, the route terminates at AR 7.

== History ==
Present-day Highway 392 was created as a state highway on April 24, 1963, as Highway 206 between US 62 and Capps as part of a large addition mileage to the state highway system. The designation was extended along a county road to Highway 7 in Harrison two years later. Following construction in Harrison, Highway 206 was extended one block along Pine Street to a relocated Highway 7 (Central Avenue) in 1967.

With three Highway 206 designations in Boone County, local leaders asked the Arkansas State Highway Commission to renumber one segment to reduce confusion. The Highway Commission renumbered the segment from Little Arkansaw and Harrison to Highway 392 on June 27, 1990.

== Major intersections ==
The entire route is in Boone County.

Location	mi	km	Destinations	Notes
Little Arkansaw	0.00	0.00	US 62 / US 412 – Eureka Springs, Huntsville, Harrison	Western terminus
	8.03	12.92	AR 397 north	West end of AR 397 concurrency; to Boone County Regional Airport
	8.21	13.21	AR 397 south	East end of AR 397 concurrency
Harrison	10.51	16.91	AR 7 (Pine Street / Central Avenue) to US 62 / US 65 – Jasper	Eastern terminus
1.000 mi = 1.609 km; 1.000 km = 0.621 mi: Concurrency terminus

== Sources ==
- "Minutes of the Meeting of the Arkansas State Highway Commission" (PDF). Little Rock: Arkansas State Highway Commission. 1953–1969. OCLC 21798861. Archived from the original (PDF) on October 1, 2018.
- "Minutes of the Meeting of the Arkansas State Highway Commission" (PDF). Little Rock: Arkansas State Highway Commission. 1970–1979. OCLC 21798861. Archived from the original (PDF) on November 5, 2011.
- "Minutes of the Meeting of the Arkansas State Highway Commission" (PDF). Little Rock: Arkansas State Highway Commission. 1980–1989. OCLC 21798861.
- "Minutes of the Meeting of the Arkansas State Highway Commission" (PDF). Little Rock: Arkansas State Highway Commission. 1990–1999. OCLC 21798861. Archived from the original (PDF) on July 21, 2019.
- "Minutes of the Meeting of the Arkansas State Highway Commission" (PDF). Little Rock: Arkansas State Highway Commission. 2000–2009. OCLC 21798861.
- "Minutes of the Meeting of the Arkansas State Highway Commission" (PDF). Little Rock: Arkansas State Highway Commission. 2010–2019. OCLC 21798861. Archived from the original (PDF) on March 4, 2016.
