= Omaha High School (Arkansas) =

Location
- 522 West College Road; Omaha, Arkansas 72622; United States; 36°26′59″N 93°12′6″W

Information
- School type: Public comprehensive
- Motto: Soar to the Stars
- Status: Open
- School district: Omaha School District
- Superintendent: Jerry Parrett
- CEEB code: 041905
- NCES School ID: 051092000821
- Principal: Nathan White
- Teaching staff: 48.88 (on FTE basis)
- Grades: 7–12
- Enrollment: 186 (2023–2024)
  - Grade 7: 35
  - Grade 8: 31
  - Grade 9: 31
  - Grade 10: 32
  - Grade 11: 31
  - Grade 12: 36
- Student to teacher ratio: 3.81
- Education system: ADE Smart Core
- Classes offered: Regular, Advanced Placement (AP)
- Colors: Green and gold
- Athletics conference: 1A East (2012-14)
- Sports: Basketball
- Mascot: Eagle
- Team name: Omaha Eagles
- Accreditation: ADE; AdvancED (1988–)
- Feeder to: Omaha Elementary School
- Affiliation: Arkansas Activities Association
- Website: www.omaha.school/page/omaha-high-school

Omaha High School is a comprehensive public high school located in Omaha, Arkansas, United States. The school provides secondary education in grades 7 through 12 for students in the Omaha and surrounding unincorporated communities of Boone County, Arkansas. It is one of six public high schools in Boone County and the sole high school administered by the Omaha School District.

== Academics ==
Omaha High School is a Title I school that is accredited by the ADE.

=== Curriculum ===
The assumed course of study follows the Smart Core curriculum developed by the Arkansas Department of Education (ADE), which requires students complete at least 22 units prior to graduation. Students complete regular coursework and exams and may take Advanced Placement (AP) courses and exam with the opportunity to receive college credit.

== Athletics ==
The Omaha High School mascot is the Eagle with green and gold serving as the school colors.

The Omaha Eagles compete in interscholastic activities within the 1A Classification, the state's smallest classification administered by the Arkansas Activities Association. The Eagles play within the 1A East Conference. Omaha fields junior varsity and varsity teams in basketball (boys/girls), baseball, fastpitch softball, track and field (boys/girls).
