= Blythe Township =

Blythe Township may refer to the following townships in the United States:

- Blythe Township, Boone County, Arkansas
- Blythe Township, Pennsylvania
