= Long Creek Township =

Long Creek Township may refer to the following townships in the United States:

- Long Creek Township, Boone County, Arkansas
- Long Creek Township, Carroll County, Arkansas
- Long Creek Township, Searcy County, Arkansas
- Long Creek Township, Macon County, Illinois
- Long Creek Township, Decatur County, Iowa
