= Bergman High School =

Location
- 8949 AR 7 North; Harrison, Arkansas 72615; United States; 36°18′51″N 93°1′1″W

Information
- School district: Bergman School District
- CEEB code: 040180
- NCES School ID: 050309000078
- Principal: Amy Curtis
- Teaching staff: 59.22 (on FTE basis)
- Grades: 9-12
- Enrollment: 276 (2023–2024)
- Student to teacher ratio: 4.66
- Colors: Blue and gold
- Mascot: Panther
- Team name: Bergman Panthers
- Communities served: Bergman, Zinc
- Website: www.bergman.k12.ar.us
- Bergman High School
- U.S. National Register of Historic Places
- Location within Arkansas Location within the United States
- Location: County Road 48, Harrison, Arkansas
- Coordinates: 36°18′48″N 93°01′03″W
- Architectural style: Late 19th And Early 20th Century American Movement, Craftsman style
- MPS: Public Schools in the Ozarks MPS
- NRHP reference No.: 92001203
- Added to NRHP: 1992

Bergman High School is a comprehensive public high school in Bergman, Arkansas, United States. Established in 1930, Bergman High School supports the communities of Bergman, Zinc and nearby unincorporated communities in Boone County and the only high school administered by the Bergman School District.

== Academics ==
The assumed course of study follows the Smart Core curriculum developed by the Arkansas Department of Education (ADE), which requires students to complete a minimum of 22 units to graduate. Students complete regular courses and exams and may elect to complete Advanced Placement (AP) coursework and exams with the opportunity to obtain college credit.

According to the district's student handbook, exceptional students who have completed at least 26 units and additional requirements related to grade point average, number of AP classes and foreign language classes may receive the distinction of Graduating with Honors, Graduating with High Honors, or Graduating with Highest Honors.

Bergman High School maintains affiliations with Arkansas Tech University–Ozark Campus and Western Arkansas Technical Center to allow students to take college courses and obtain concurrent credit.

== Extracurricular activities ==
The Bergman High School mascot and athletic emblem is the panther with blue and gold serving as the school colors.

For 2012–14, the Bergman Panthers compete in interscholastic sports at the 3A Classification administered by the Arkansas Activities Association. The Panthers compete in the 3A Region 1 East Conference with teams competing in volleyball, basketball (boys/girls), golf (boys/girls), soccer (boys/girls), tennis (boys/girls), baseball, fastpitch softball, track and field (boys/girls), and cheer.

- Tennis: The girls tennis team won three consecutive state tennis championships in 2004, 2005 and 2006.

== History ==
The original high school building, a vernacular Craftsman style masonry building built in 1930, was listed on the National Register of Historic Places in 1992.

== Notable alumni ==
- John Burris, member of the Arkansas House of Representatives from District 98
