= Jefferson Township, Arkansas =

Jefferson Township, Arkansas may refer to:

- Jefferson Township, Boone County, Arkansas
- Jefferson Township, Calhoun County, Arkansas
- Jefferson Township, Desha County, Arkansas
- Jefferson Township, Independence County, Arkansas
- Jefferson Township, Izard County, Arkansas
- Jefferson Township, Jackson County, Arkansas
- Jefferson Township, Jefferson County, Arkansas
- Jefferson Township, Little River County, Arkansas
- Jefferson Township, Marion County, Arkansas
- Jefferson Township, Newton County, Arkansas
- Jefferson Township, Ouachita County, Arkansas
- Jefferson Township, Saline County, Arkansas
- Jefferson Township, Sevier County, Arkansas
- Jefferson Township, White County, Arkansas

== See also ==
- List of townships in Arkansas
- Jefferson Township (disambiguation)
