= Little Arkansaw, Arkansas =

- Unincorporated community
- Location within Arkansas Location within the United States
- Coordinates: 36°17′21″N 93°14′12″W
- Country: United States
- State: Arkansas
- County: Boone
- Elevation: 1,424 ft (434 m)
- Time zone: UTC-6 (Central (CST))
  - Summer (DST): UTC-5 (CDT)
- Area code: 870
- GNIS feature ID: 77508

Little Arkansaw (also known as Jennings) is an unincorporated community in Boone County, Arkansas, United States. Little Arkansaw is located on Arkansas Highway 392 near its junction with U.S. Route 62 and U.S. Route 412, 3.1 miles (5.0 km) east of Alpena.
