= Arkansas Highway 397 (1973–1980) =

Former state highway in Arkansas, United States

Highway 397

Route information
- Length: 1.2 mi (1.9 km)
- Existed: April 25, 1973–January 30, 1980

Major junctions
- From: US 65 in Omaha
- To: Route JJ at the Missouri state line

Location
- Country: United States
- State: Arkansas
- Counties: Boone

Highway system
- Arkansas Highway System; Interstate; US; State; Business; Spurs; Suffixed; Scenic; Heritage

Highway 397 (AR 397 and Hwy. 397) is a former north–south state highway in Boone County, Arkansas. It was created by the Arkansas State Highway Commission on April 25, 1973, at the same meeting as the currently extant designation, between US 65 (now Highway 14) and the Missouri state line near Omaha. It was removed from the state highway system in exchange for an extension of Highway 123 at the request of the Boone County Judge.

== Major intersections ==
The entire route was in Boone County.

Location	mi	km	Destinations	Notes
Omaha	0.0	0.0	US 65	Southern terminus
Missouri state line	1.2	1.9	Route JJ	Northern terminus; continuation into Missouri
1.000 mi = 1.609 km; 1.000 km = 0.621 mi
