= Omaha School District =

Omaha School District can refer to:

- Omaha Public Schools (Omaha, Nebraska)
- Omaha School District (Omaha, Arkansas)
