= Crooked Creek Township, Boone County, Arkansas =

Crooked Creek Township, Arkansas
- Township
- Township of Crooked Creek
- Interactive map of Crooked Creek Township, Arkansas
- Coordinates: 36.1876°N 93.1710°W
- Country: United States
- State: Arkansas
- County: Boone
- Named for: Crooked Creek
- Time zone: UTC-6 (CST)
  - Summer (DST): UTC-5 (CDT)
- Area code: 870

Crooked Creek Township was a township in Boone County, Arkansas, United States. Named for Crooked Creek, its last appearance was on the United States Census of 1930.

== Demographics ==
Census	Population
1930	96
1920	167
1910	283
1900	524
1890	1,082
1880	1,116
1870	646
1860 (area part of Carroll County at the time)	1,020
1850 (area part of Carroll County at the time)	539
