= Alpena High School (Arkansas) =

Location
- 300 South Denver Street Bldg. A Alpena, Arkansas 72611-0270; United States; 36°17′31″N 93°17′41″W

Information
- School type: Public comprehensive
- Status: Open
- School district: Alpena School District
- CEEB code: 040010
- NCES School ID: 050228000007
- Teaching staff: 77.60 (on FTE basis)
- Grades: 7–12
- Enrollment: 208 (2023-2024)
- Student to teacher ratio: 2.68
- Education system: ADE Smart Core
- Classes offered: Regular, Advanced Placement (AP)
- Colors: Maroon and white
- Athletics conference: 1A East
- Mascot: Leopard
- Team name: Alpena Leopards
- Accreditation: ADE
- Website: www.alpenaschools.k12.ar.us/high-school-home

Alpena High School is a comprehensive public high school located in the rural, distant community of Alpena, Arkansas, United States. The school provides secondary education for students in grades 7 through 12. It is one of nine public high schools in Boone County, Arkansas and the sole high school administered by the Alpena School District.

== Academics ==
Alpena High School is accredited by the Arkansas Department of Education (ADE) and the assumed course of study follows the Smart Core curriculum developed by the ADE, which requires students complete at least 22 units prior to graduation. Students complete regular coursework and exams and may take Advanced Placement (AP) courses and exam with the opportunity to receive college credit.

== Athletics ==
The Alpena High School mascot and athletic emblem is the leopard with maroon and white serving as the school colors.

The Alpena Leopards compete in interscholastic activities within the 1A Classification—the state's smallest classification—via the 1A East Conference, as administered by the Arkansas Activities Association. The Leopards field teams in golf (boys/girls), basketball (boys/girls), track and field (boys/girls), baseball, and competitive cheer.
