= Alpena School District =

School district in Arkansas

Location
- 300 S. Denver Street; Alpena, Arkansas 72611 United States

District information
- Type: Public / Rural
- Grades: K-12
- Superintendent: Anthony Dowdy
- Budget: $5.09 million (2009-2010 academic year)

Students and staff
- Enrollment: 596 (2009-2010 academic year)
- Student–teacher ratio: 9.46 (2009-2010 academic year)
- District mascot: Leopards

Other information
- Website: alpenaschools.k12.ar.us

Alpena School District is a public school district whose facilities are in Boone County, Arkansas, United States which serves most of the city of Alpena along with surrounding unincorporated areas within Boone, Carroll, and Newton counties.

== History ==
In 1980 the Newton County School District dissolved, with a portion going to the Alpena district.

== Schools ==
- Alpena High School
- Alpena Elementary School

=== Alpena High School ===
Alpena High School serves seventh through twelfth grades. Based on the 2009-2010 academic year, the total enrollment in the school was 237 and total full-time teachers was 33.30, with a teacher/student ratio of 7.12.

=== Alpena Elementary School ===
Alpena Elementary School serves preschool through sixth grades. Based on the 2009-2010 academic year, the total enrollment in the school was 359 and total full-time teachers was 29.70, with a teacher/student ratio of 12.09.

== Board of education ==
The Alpena School District Board of Education is composed of five elected members. Regular meetings are held monthly.

== Staffing ==
Based on the 2009-2010 academic year, the total full-time staff of the Alpena School District was 112. The total full-time teachers was 63. The total number of non-teaching staff (including 3 administrators) was 49.

== Expenditures ==
Based on the 2011-2012 Proposed Budget, expected expenditures for 2011-2012 were:

Category	Amount
Bonded Debt Payment	$114,115.00
Instructional	$490,000.00
Non-Bonded Debt Payment	$47,838.00
Operational and Maintenance	$505,000.00
Other Operating Expense	$75,000.00
Salaries	$2,500,000.00
Transportation	$265,000.00

== Demographics ==
Within the geographic area covered by the Alpena School District, there were 715 individuals under the age of 18, during the 2009-2010 academic year.

== See also ==
- List of school districts in Arkansas
