= South Harrison Township, Boone County, Arkansas =

South Harrison Township
- Township
- Location in Arkansas
- Coordinates: 36°11′25.71″N 93°8′4.34″W
- Country: United States
- State: Arkansas
- County: Boone

Area
  - Total: 27.175 sq mi (70.38 km^{2})
  - Land: 27.101 sq mi (70.19 km^{2})
  - Water: 0.074 sq mi (0.19 km^{2})

Population (2010)
  - Total: 7,590
  - Density: 280.06/sq mi (108.13/km^{2})
- Time zone: UTC-6 (CST)
  - Summer (DST): UTC-5 (CDT)
- Zip Code: 72601 (Harrison)
- Area code: 870

South Harrison Township is one of twenty current townships in Boone County, Arkansas, USA. As of the 2010 census, its total population was 7,590.

Although the township includes a significant portion of the city of Harrison, it also encompasses rural areas. Prior to 1950, this township, along with North Harrison Township, were part of a single Harrison Township. Boundary lines may have been different between the former single Harrison Township and the two modern day townships.

== Geography ==
According to the United States Census Bureau, South Harrison Township covers an area of 27.175 square miles (70.38 km^{2}); 27.101 square miles (70.19 km^{2}) of land and 0.074 square miles (0.19 km^{2}) of water.

=== Cities, towns, and villages ===
- Harrison (part)

== Population history ==
The population history includes the population of that portion of the city of Harrison which is included within the boundaries of this township.

Historical population
Census	Pop.	Note	%±
1950	2,958		—
1960	3,486		17.8%
1970	4,161		19.4%
1980	5,174		24.3%
1990	6,320		22.1%
2000	7,087		12.1%
2010	7,590		7.1%
