= Bergman School District =

School district in Arkansas, United States

Location
- 8949 Hwy 7 N Bergman, Arkansas 72615 United States
- Coordinates: 36°18′51″N 93°1′1″W

District information
- Type: Public / Rural
- Grades: K-12
- Superintendent: Joe Couch
- Schools: 3
- Budget: $12.36 million (2023-2024 academic year)

Students and staff
- Enrollment: 1,021 (2023-2024 academic year)
- Student–teacher ratio: 9.09 (2023-2024 academic year)
- District mascot: Panthers

Other information
- Website: www.bergman.k12.ar.us

Bergman School District is a public school district in Boone County, Arkansas, United States which serves the cities of Bergman and Zinc along with surrounding unincorporated areas within Boone County.

== Schools ==
- Bergman High School
- Bergman Middle School
- Bergman Elementary School

=== Bergman High School ===
Bergman High School serves ninth through twelfth grades. As of the 2023-2024 academic year, the total enrollment in the school was 276 and total full-time teachers was 59.22, with a teacher/student ratio of 4.66.

=== Bergman Middle School ===
Bergman Middle School serves fifth through eighth grades. Based on the 2009-2010 academic year, the total enrollment in the school was 342 and total full-time teachers was 30.70, with a teacher/student ratio of 11.14.

=== Bergman Elementary School ===
Bergman Elementary School serves preschool through fourth grades. Based on the 2009-2010 academic year, the total enrollment in the school was 439 and total full-time teachers was 28.60, with a teacher/student ratio of 15.35.

== Board of education ==
The Bergman School District Board of Education is composed of five elected members. Regular meetings are held monthly.

== Staffing ==
Based on the 2009-2010 academic year, the total full-time staff of the Bergman School District was 170. The total full-time teachers was 88. The total number of non-teaching staff (including 4 administrators) was 82.

== Demographics ==
Within the geographic area covered by the Bergman School District, there were 1,099 individuals under the age of 18, during the 2009-2010 academic year.

== See also ==
- List of school districts in Arkansas
