= North Harrison Township, Boone County, Arkansas =

North Harrison Township
- Township
- Location in Arkansas
- Coordinates: 36°15′1.16″N 93°6′8.34″W
- Country: United States
- State: Arkansas
- County: Boone

Area
  - Total: 16.988 sq mi (44.00 km^{2})
  - Land: 16.933 sq mi (43.86 km^{2})
  - Water: 0.055 sq mi (0.14 km^{2})

Population (2010)
  - Total: 8,057
  - Density: 475.82/sq mi (183.72/km^{2})
- Time zone: UTC-6 (CST)
  - Summer (DST): UTC-5 (CDT)
- Zip Code: 72601 (Harrison)
- Area code: 870

North Harrison Township is one of twenty current townships in Boone County, Arkansas, USA. As of the 2010 census, its total population was 8,057.

Although the township includes a significant portion of the city of Harrison, it also encompasses rural areas. Prior to 1950, this township, along with South Harrison Township, were part of a single Harrison Township. Boundary lines may have been different between the former single Harrison Township and the two modern day townships.

== Geography ==
According to the United States Census Bureau, North Harrison Township covers an area of 16.988 square miles (44.00 km^{2}); 16.933 square miles (43.86 km^{2}) of land and 0.055 square miles (0.14 km^{2}) of water.

=== Cities, towns, and villages ===
- Harrison (part)

== Population history ==
The population history includes the population of that portion of the city of Harrison which is included within the boundaries of this township.

Historical population
Census	Pop.	Note	%±
1950	4,179		—
1960	4,716		12.8%
1970	5,471		16.0%
1980	7,117		30.1%
1990	6,393		−10.2%
2000	7,748		21.2%
2010	8,057		4.0%
