= Young Township, Boone County, Arkansas =

Young Township
- Former Township
- Interactive map of Young Township
- Coordinates: 36°23′00″N 93°17′01″W
- Country: United States
- State: Arkansas
- County: Boone
- Time zone: UTC-6 (CST)
  - Summer (DST): UTC-5 (CDT)
- Area code: 870

Young Township is a former township of Boone County, Arkansas, USA. Its last appearance on the US Census was in 1950.

== Population history ==
Census	Population
1950	151
1940	183
1930	207
1920	247
1910	211
1900	347
1890	377
