= Elmwood Township, Boone County, Arkansas =

Elmwood Township
- Former Township
- Interactive map of Elmwood Township
- Coordinates: 36.1376°N 93.1043°W
- Country: United States
- State: Arkansas
- County: Boone
- Time zone: UTC-6 (CST)
  - Summer (DST): UTC-5 (CDT)
- Area code: 870

Elmwood Township is a former township of Boone County, Arkansas, USA. Its last appearance on the US Census was in 1950.

== Population history ==
Census	Population
1950	229
1940	236
1930	195
1920	209
