= Elixir Township, Boone County, Arkansas =

Elixir Township
- Township
- Location in Arkansas
- Coordinates: 36°19′6.20″N 93°0′29.27″W
- Country: United States
- State: Arkansas
- County: Boone

Area
  - Total: 52.053 sq mi (134.82 km^{2})
  - Land: 52.002 sq mi (134.68 km^{2})
  - Water: 0.051 sq mi (0.13 km^{2})

Population (2010)
  - Total: 2,802
  - Density: 53.88/sq mi (20.80/km^{2})
- Time zone: UTC-6 (CST)
  - Summer (DST): UTC-5 (CDT)
- Zip Code: 72615 (Bergman)
- Area code: 870

Elixir Township is one of twenty current townships in Boone County, Arkansas, USA. As of the 2010 census, its total population was 2,802.

== Geography ==
According to the United States Census Bureau, Elixir Township covers an area of 52.053 square miles (134.82 km^{2}); 52.002 square miles (134.68 km^{2}) of land and 0.051 square miles (0.13 km^{2}) of water.

=== Cities, towns, and villages ===
- Bergman

=== Former cities, towns, and villages ===
- Elixir
- Keener

== Population history ==
The population includes the incorporated town of Bergman.

Historical population
| Census | Pop. | Note | %± |
|---|---|---|---|
| 1890 | 716 | | — |
| 1900 | 679 | | −5.2% |
| 1910 | 607 | | −10.6% |
| 1920 | 691 | | 13.8% |
| 1930 | 675 | | −2.3% |
| 1940 | 679 | | 0.6% |
| 1950 | 608 | | −10.5% |
| 1960 | 527 | | −13.3% |
| 1970 | 924 | | 75.3% |
| 1980 | 1,573 | | 70.2% |
| 1990 | 1,927 | | 22.5% |
| 2000 | 2,304 | | 19.6% |
| 2010 | 2,802 | | 21.6% |
