= Blythe Township, Boone County, Arkansas =

Blythe Township
- Township
- Location in Arkansas
- Coordinates: 36°13′0.24″N 92°56′32.96″W
- Country: United States
- State: Arkansas
- County: Boone

Area
  - Total: 11.857 sq mi (30.71 km^{2})
  - Land: 11.803 sq mi (30.57 km^{2})
  - Water: 0.054 sq mi (0.14 km^{2})

Population (2010)
  - Total: 245
  - Density: 20.76/sq mi (8.02/km^{2})
- Time zone: UTC-6 (CST)
  - Summer (DST): UTC-5 (CDT)
- Zip Code: 72601 (Harrison)
- Area code: 870

Blythe Township is one of twenty current townships in Boone County, Arkansas, USA. As of the 2010 census, its total population was 245.

== Geography ==
According to the United States Census Bureau, Blythe Township covers an area of 11.857 square miles (30.71 km^{2}); 11.803 square miles (30.57 km^{2}) of land and 0.054 square miles (0.14 km^{2}) of water.

== Population history ==
In 1910, the township included the area of the incorporated town of Zinc. That area is now part of Zinc Township.

Historical population
Census	Pop.	Note	%±
1880	489		—
1890	489		0.0%
1900	865		76.9%
1910	758		−12.4%
1920	281		−62.9%
1930	227		−19.2%
1940	205		−9.7%
1950	177		−13.7%
1960	139		−21.5%
1970	112		−19.4%
1980	235		109.8%
1990	181		−23.0%
2000	266		47.0%
2010	245		−7.9%
