= H.S. Mabry Barn =

- U.S. National Register of Historic Places
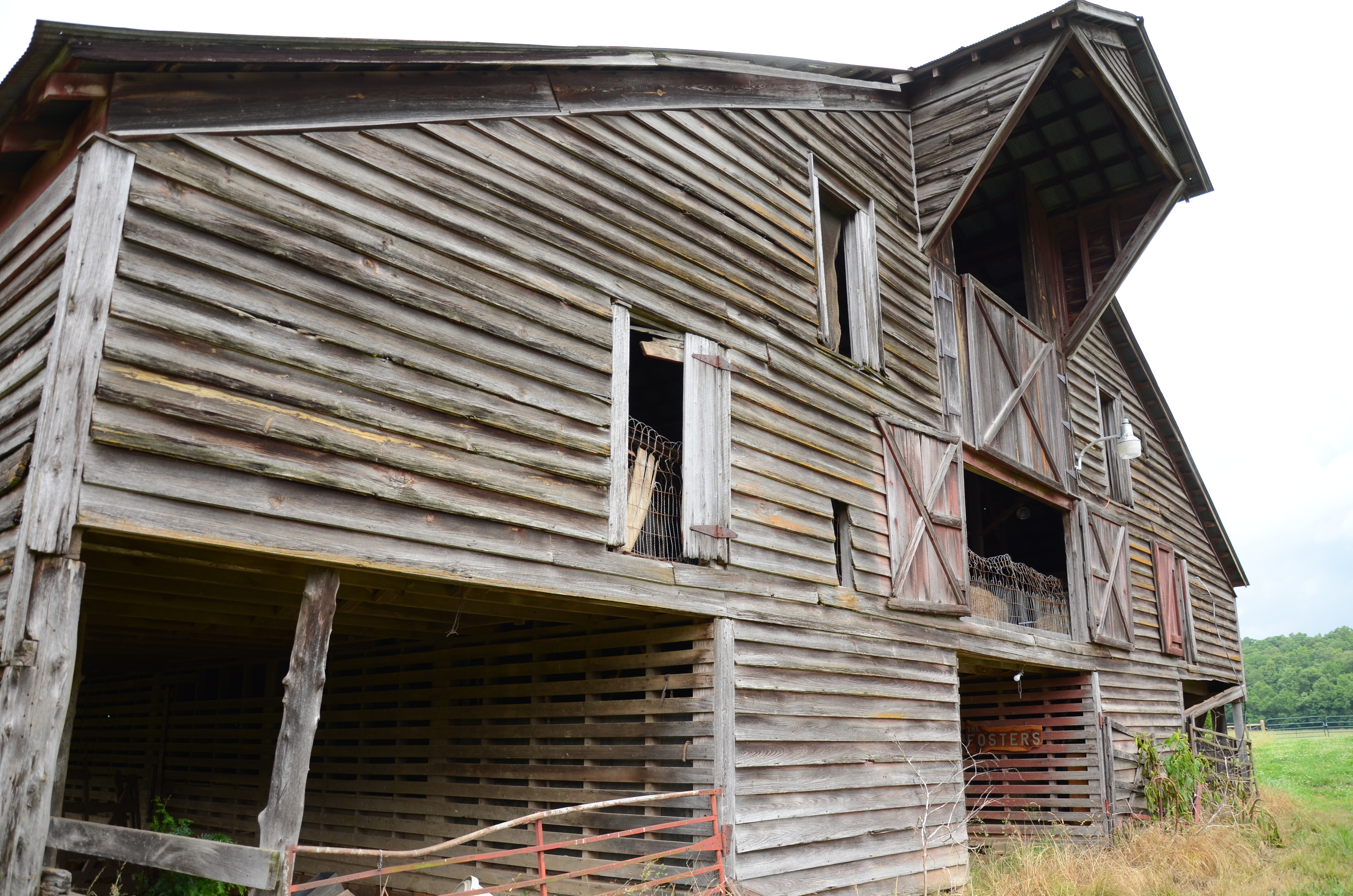
- Gable end with hay hood, May 2016

- Location within Arkansas Location within the United States
- Location: Near Johnson Creek, East Richwoods, Arkansas
- Coordinates: 35°49′11″N 92°6′53″W
- Area: less than one acre
- Built: 1922
- Built by: Albert Huebbler
- Architectural style: Traverse Crib plan
- MPS: Stone County MRA
- NRHP reference No.: 85002236
- Added to NRHP: September 17, 1985

The H.S. Mabry Barn is a historic barn in rural central Stone County, Arkansas. It is located on the north side of County Road 21, south of Mountain View. It is a large two-story wood-frame structure, built in a transverse crib plan with animal stalls flanking a central drive that parallels the ridge of the gabled roof. Sheds extend the covered area on each of the long sides. The barn was built c. 1922 by Albert Hubbler to house H. S. Mabry's mule herd, and is noted for its unusually large size.

It has a hay hood.

The barn was listed on the National Register of Historic Places in 1985.

== See also ==
- National Register of Historic Places listings in Stone County, Arkansas

== Gallery ==
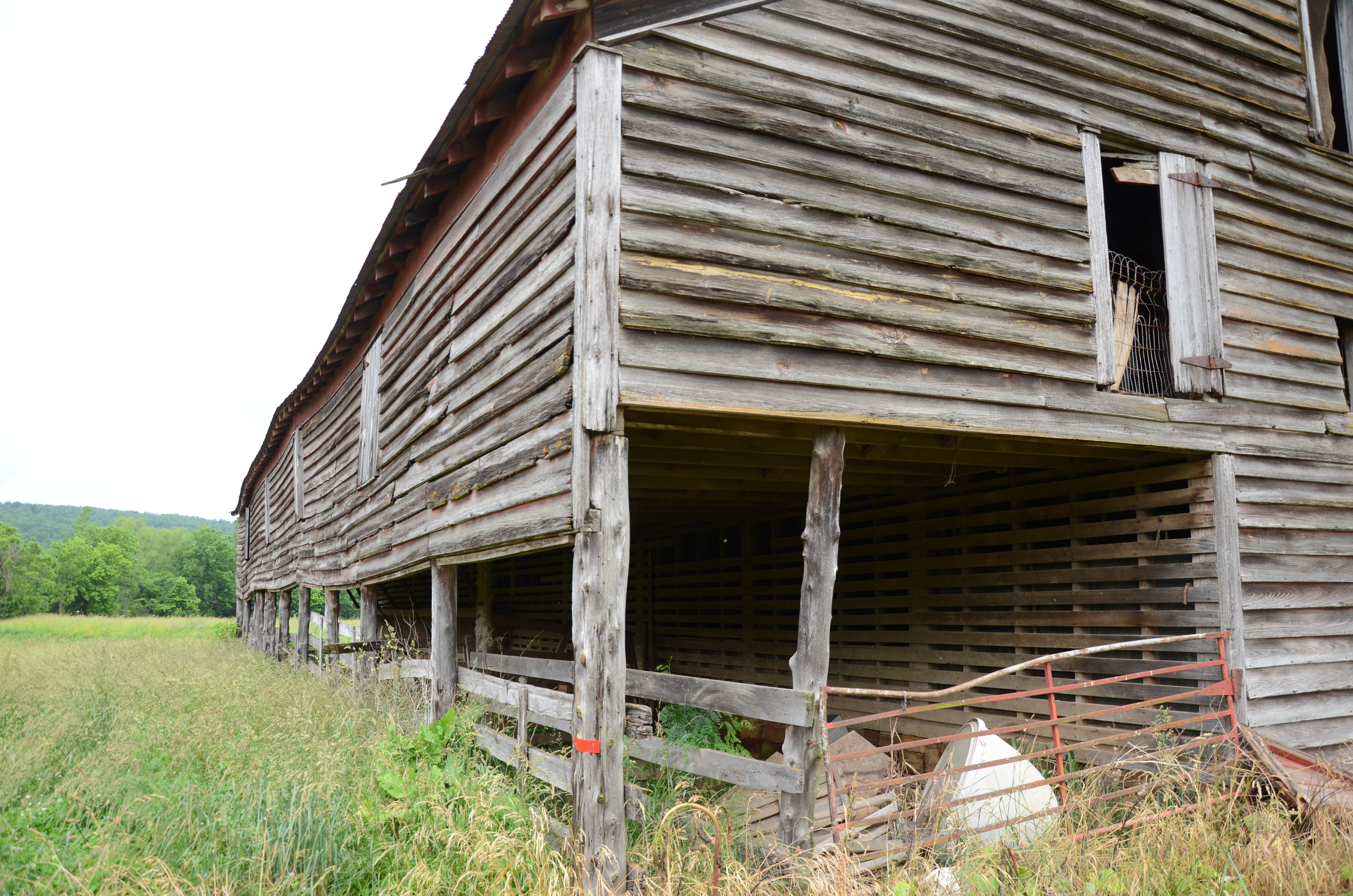
East Side, May 2016

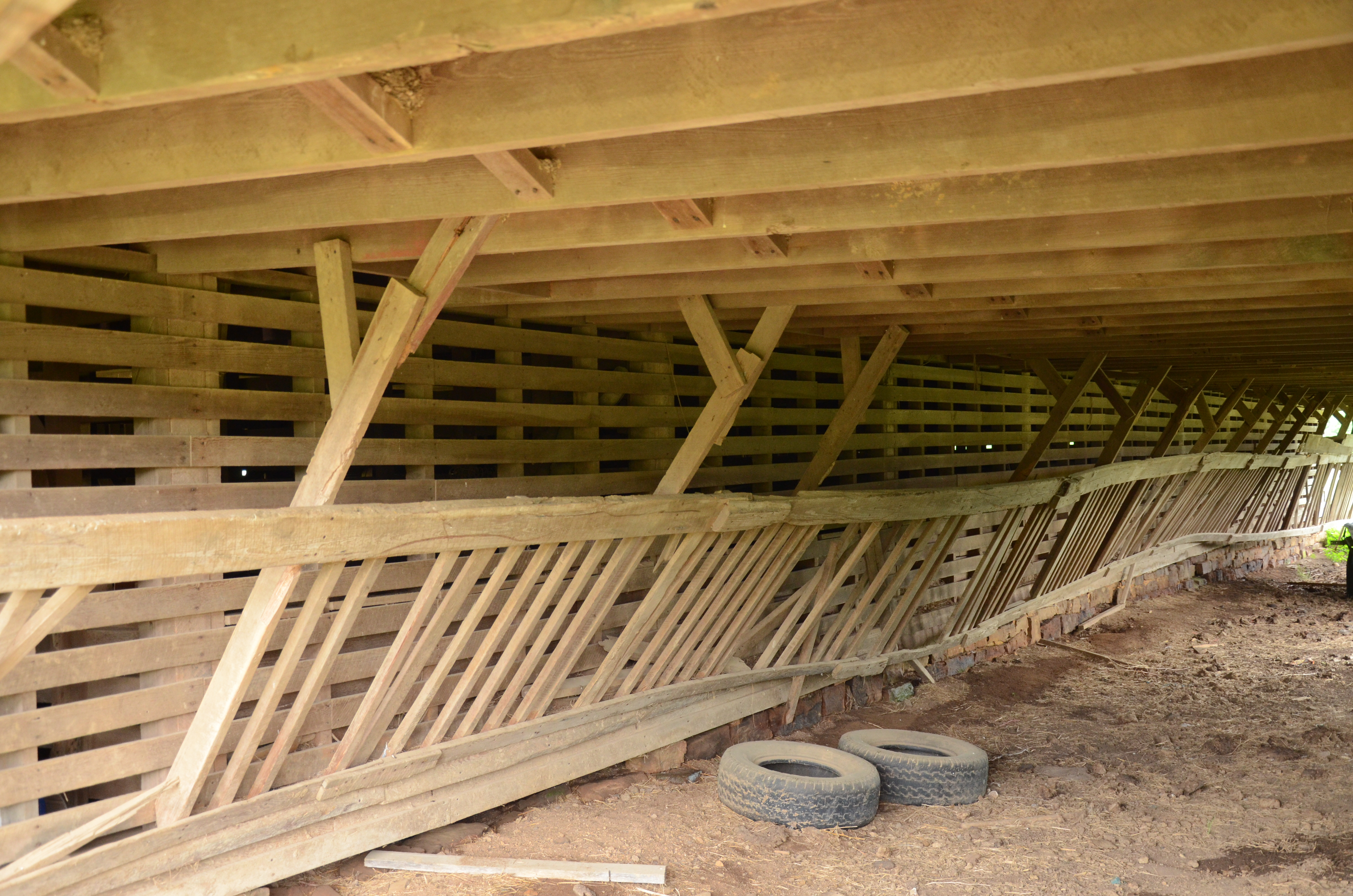
Feed Trough, May 2016

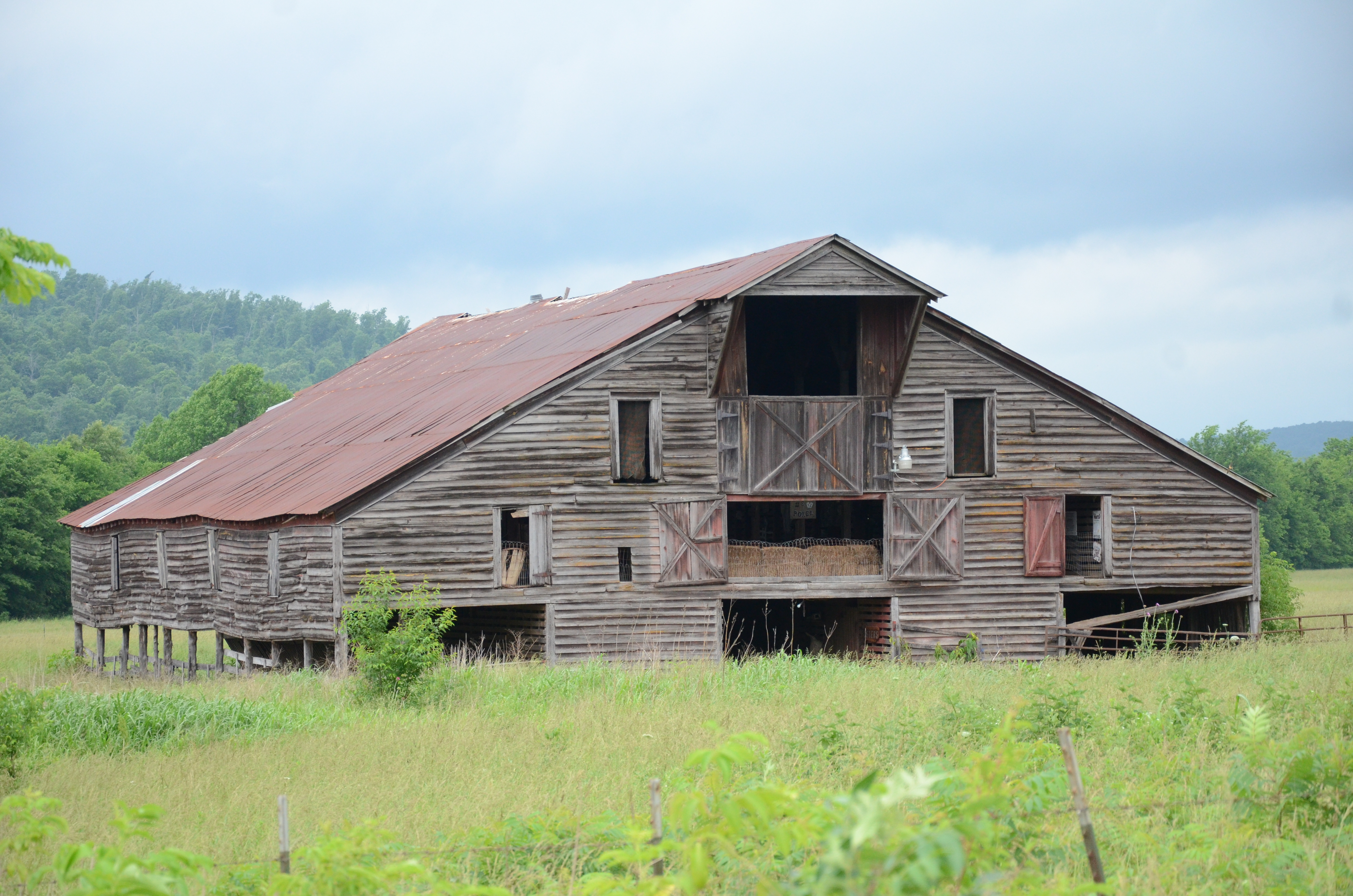
Front View, May 2016
