= Washington Township, Boone County, Arkansas =

Washington Township
- Former Township
- Interactive map of Washington Township
- Coordinates: 36°15′15″N 93°01′01″W
- Country: United States
- State: Arkansas
- County: Boone
- Time zone: UTC-6 (CST)
  - Summer (DST): UTC-5 (CDT)
- Area code: 870

Washington Township is a former township of Boone County, Arkansas, USA. Its last appearance on the US Census was in 1950.

== Population history ==
Census	Population
1950	361
1940	373
1930	403
1920	481
1910	610
1900	749
1890	754
1880	810
1870	445
1860 (area part of Carroll County at the time)	512

== Other townships ==
The Geographic Names Information System lists 13 townships named Washington in various counties in Arkansas.
