= Batavia Township, Boone County, Arkansas =

Batavia Township
- Township
- Location in Arkansas
- Coordinates: 36°15′38.94″N 93°14′7.45″W
- Country: United States
- State: Arkansas
- County: Boone

Area
  - Total: 10.685 sq mi (27.67 km^{2})
  - Land: 10.658 sq mi (27.60 km^{2})
  - Water: 0.027 sq mi (0.070 km^{2})

Population (2010)
  - Total: 911
  - Density: 85.48/sq mi (33.00/km^{2})
- Time zone: UTC-6 (CST)
  - Summer (DST): UTC-5 (CDT)
- Zip Code: 72601 (Harrison)
- Area code: 870

Batavia Township is one of 20 current townships in Boone County, Arkansas, USA. As of the 2010 census, its total population was 911. Batavia, Arkansas was settled in 1881 by Roswell Emerson Underwood, who spent four years as a Genesee County, New York, surveyor for the Holland Land Company. He was impressed by the beauty of this site which is located in the foothills of the Ozark Mountains. He was the first postmaster, and named the town for Batavia, New York, his former residence.

== Geography ==
According to the United States Census Bureau, Batavia Township covers an area of 10.685 square miles (27.67 km^{2}); 10.658 square miles (27.60 km^{2}) of land and 0.027 square miles (0.070 km^{2}) of water.

=== Former cities, towns, and villages ===
- Batavia: There was formerly an incorporated town of Batavia within the township. It is now an unincorporated community. Currently, there are no incorporated cities or towns in the township.

== History ==
Batavia is an unincorporated community in Boone County, Arkansas, United States. Batavia is located on Arkansas Highway 392 5.0 miles (8.0 km) west-northwest of Harrison.

Batavia was a former incorporated town. In 1880, Roswell Underwood established the first post office in the former town. He named it Batavia after his hometown of Batavia, New York. The town was laid out in blocks. The first house on Main Street was built in 1912. Arkansas Highway 206 is where Main Street used to be located. The post office was closed in 1955. During its heyday, businesses included stores, hotels, a canning factory, a train depot, stockyards, mills, a corn gristmill, and a blacksmith shop. There was also a school and churches. By 1926, the passenger railroad stopped going through Batavia. While the community is bigger in terms of population and homes than it was as an incorporated town, the businesses are fewer. Batavia township still exists (see township population history) without any current incorporated towns inside of it.

George W. O'Neal founded the Pilot Knob Fruit Farm, one mile from Batavia. He devoted this entire farm to commercial fruit, and by 1905 had set out more than 10,000 apple and peach trees. A few years later, he planted several thousand more, making Pilot Knob Farm an even larger operation.

Iowa native Frank Warning was another big fruit grower in Boone County. He was vice president of the Ozark Fruit and Produce Company and a stockholder in the Batavia Fruit Company. The Batavia Fruit Company owned 1,431 acres on which were set 130,000 peach trees. The Ozark Fruit Company had set out 35,000 peach trees, and in 1905 had plans to set out 15,000 more trees that spring. Warning, along with his father, owned 240 acres of fine land located about a mile from Harrison, and that, too, became another fruit farm.

== Population history ==
Historical population
Census	Pop.	Note	%±
1910	439		—
1920	270		−38.5%
1930	288		6.7%
1940	312		8.3%
1950	162		−48.1%
1960	231		42.6%
1970	171		−26.0%
1980	272		59.1%
1990	682		150.7%
2000	851		24.8%
2010	911		7.1%
