= Bellefonte Township, Boone County, Arkansas =

Bellefonte Township
- Township
- Location in Arkansas
- Coordinates: 36°12′8.9″N 93°1′57.43″W
- Country: United States
- State: Arkansas
- County: Boone

Area
  - Total: 25.381 sq mi (65.74 km^{2})
  - Land: 25.334 sq mi (65.61 km^{2})
  - Water: 0.047 sq mi (0.12 km^{2})

Population (2010)
  - Total: 2,380
  - Density: 93.94/sq mi (36.27/km^{2})
- Time zone: UTC-6 (CST)
  - Summer (DST): UTC-5 (CDT)
- Zip Code: 72601 (Harrison)
- Area code: 870

Bellefonte Township is one of 20 current townships in Boone County, Arkansas, USA. As of the 2010 census, its total population was 2,380.

== Geography ==
According to the United States Census Bureau, Bellefonte Township covers an area of 25.381 square miles (65.74 km^{2}); 25.334 square miles (65.61 km^{2}) of land and 0.047 square miles (0.12 km^{2}) of water.

=== Cities, towns, and villages ===
- Bellefonte
- Harrison (part)

== Population history ==
Figures include the population of the town of Bellefonte and in recent decades a part of the city of Harrison.

Historical population
Census	Pop.	Note	%±
1880	1,379		—
1890	1,018		−26.2%
1900	850		−16.5%
1910	747		−12.1%
1920	629		−15.8%
1930	570		−9.4%
1940	773		35.6%
1950	739		−4.4%
1960	909		23.0%
1970	1,283		41.1%
1980	1,860		45.0%
1990	2,024		8.8%
2000	2,234		10.4%
2010	2,380		6.5%
