= Long Creek Township, Boone County, Arkansas =

Long Creek Township
- Township
- Location in Arkansas
- Coordinates: 36°22′46.16″N 93°12′51.15″W
- Country: United States
- State: Arkansas
- County: Boone

Area
  - Total: 39.726 sq mi (102.89 km^{2})
  - Land: 39.655 sq mi (102.71 km^{2})
  - Water: 0.071 sq mi (0.18 km^{2})

Population (2010)
  - Total: 902
  - Density: 22.75/sq mi (8.78/km^{2})
- Time zone: UTC-6 (CST)
  - Summer (DST): UTC-5 (CDT)
- Zip Code: 72662 (Omaha), 72611 (Alpena)
- Area code: 870

Long Creek Township is one of twenty current townships in Boone County, Arkansas, USA. As of the 2010 census, its total population was 902.

== Geography ==
According to the United States Census Bureau, Long Creek Township covers an area of 39.726 square miles (102.89 km^{2}); 39.655 square miles (102.71 km^{2}) of land and 0.071 square miles (0.18 km^{2}) of water.

== Population history ==
Census	Population
2010	902
2000	749
1990	586
1980	520
1970	419
1960	359
1950	388
1940	460
1930	460
1920	544
1910	542
1900	562
1890	518
1880	486
1870	214
1860 (area part of Carroll County at the time)	503
1850 (area part of Carroll County at the time)	294
