= Summit Township, Boone County, Arkansas =

Summit Township
- Township
- Location in Arkansas
- Coordinates: 36°10′12.45″N 93°15′2.84″W
- Country: United States
- State: Arkansas
- County: Boone

Area
  - Total: 32.277 sq mi (83.60 km^{2})
  - Land: 32.201 sq mi (83.40 km^{2})
  - Water: 0.076 sq mi (0.20 km^{2})

Population (2010)
  - Total: 556
  - Density: 17.27/sq mi (6.67/km^{2})
- Time zone: UTC-6 (CST)
  - Summer (DST): UTC-5 (CDT)
- Zip Code: 72601 (Harrison)
- Area code: 870

Summit Township is one of twenty current townships in Boone County, Arkansas, USA]. At the 2010 census, its total population was 556.

== Geography ==
According to the United States Census Bureau, Summit Township covers an area of 32.277 square miles (83.60 km^{2}); 32.201 square miles (83.40 km^{2}) of land and 0.076 square miles (0.20 km^{2}) of water.

== Population history ==
Historical population
Census	Pop.	Note	%±
1880	341		—
1890	425		24.6%
1900	399		−6.1%
1910	343		−14.0%
1920	352		2.6%
1930	236		−33.0%
1940	264		11.9%
1950	262		−0.8%
1960	183		−30.2%
1970	257		40.4%
1980	288		12.1%
1990	387		34.4%
2000	491		26.9%
2010	556		13.2%
