= Harrison Township, Boone County, Arkansas =

Harrison Township
- Former Township
- Interactive map of Harrison Township
- Coordinates: 36°13′00″N 93°07′01″W
- Country: United States
- State: Arkansas
- County: Boone
- Time zone: UTC-6 (CST)
  - Summer (DST): UTC-5 (CDT)
- Area code: 870

Harrison Township is a former township of Boone County, Arkansas, USA. Its last appearance on the US Census was in 1930.

Today, much of the city of Harrison is in the townships of North Harrison and South Harrison.

== Cities, towns, villages ==
- Harrison

At the time this township existed, Harrison was considered a town. In modern times, Harrison is a city.

== Population history ==
| Census | Population |
|---|---|
| 1930 | 4,836 |
| 1920 | 4,608 |
| 1910 | 2,743 |
| 1900 | 2,849 |
| 1890 | 2,240 |
| 1880 | 1,834 |
| 1870 | 826 |
