= Gaither Township, Boone County, Arkansas =

Gaither Township
- Township
- Location in Arkansas
- Coordinates: 36°8′52.77″N 93°9′27.68″W
- Country: United States
- State: Arkansas
- County: Boone

Area
  - Total: 21.005 sq mi (54.40 km^{2})
  - Land: 20.991 sq mi (54.37 km^{2})
  - Water: 0.014 sq mi (0.036 km^{2})

Population (2010)
  - Total: 676
  - Density: 32.2/sq mi (12.4/km^{2})
- Time zone: UTC-6 (CST)
  - Summer (DST): UTC-5 (CDT)
- Zip Code: 72601 (Harrison)
- Area code: 870

Gaither Township is one of twenty current townships in Boone County, Arkansas, USA. As of the 2010 census, its total population was 676.

== Geography ==
According to the United States Census Bureau, Gaither Township covers an area of 21.005 square miles (54.40 km^{2}); 20.991 square miles (54.37 km^{2}) of land and 0.014 square miles (0.036 km^{2}) of water.

== Population history ==
Populations before 1870 cover the time when this area was part of Carroll County.

Historical population
Census	Pop.	Note	%±
1840	425		—
1850	508		19.5%
1860	972		91.3%
1870	955		−1.7%
1880	1,788		87.2%
1890	2,942		64.5%
1900	523		−82.2%
1910	453		−13.4%
1920	336		−25.8%
1930	254		−24.4%
1940	253		−0.4%
1950	228		−9.9%
1980	592		—
1990	653		10.3%
2000	717		9.8%
2010	676		−5.7%
