= Lee Township, Boone County, Arkansas =

Lee Township
- Township
- Location in Arkansas
- Coordinates: 36°19′36.46″N 93°6′20.76″W
- Country: United States
- State: Arkansas
- County: Boone

Area
  - Total: 45.841 sq mi (118.73 km^{2})
  - Land: 45.837 sq mi (118.72 km^{2})
  - Water: 0.004 sq mi (0.010 km^{2})

Population (2010)
  - Total: 1,867
  - Density: 40.73/sq mi (15.73/km^{2})
- Time zone: UTC-6 (CST)
  - Summer (DST): UTC-5 (CDT)
- Zip Code: 72601 (Harrison)
- Area code: 870

Lee Township is one of twenty current townships in Boone County, Arkansas, USA. As of the 2010 census, its total population was 1,867.

== Geography ==
According to the United States Census Bureau, Lee Township covers an area of 45.841 square miles (118.73 km^{2}); 45.837 square miles (118.72 km^{2}) of land and 0.004 square miles (0.010 km^{2}) of water.

== Population history ==
Census	Population
2010	1,867
2000	1,510
1990	1,073
1980	978
1970	658
1960	531
1950	590
1940	623
1930	639
1920	694
1910	590
1900	806
1890	550
1880	288
