= Batavia, Arkansas =

- Census-designated place
- Location within Arkansas Location within the United States
- Coordinates: 36°15′14″N 93°13′01″W
- Country: United States
- State: Arkansas
- County: Boone
- Elevation: 1,532 ft (467 m)

Population (2020)
  - Total: 328
- Time zone: UTC-6 (Central (CST))
  - Summer (DST): UTC-5 (CDT)
- Area code: 870
- GNIS feature ID: 2805620

Batavia is an unincorporated community and census-designated place (CDP) in Boone County, Arkansas, United States. It was first listed as a CDP in the 2020 census with a population of 328.

Batavia is located on Arkansas Highway 392, 5.0 miles (8.0 km) west-northwest of Harrison.

Batavia was formerly an incorporated town. In 1880, Roswell Underwood established the first post office in the former town, which he named Batavia after his hometown of Batavia, New York. The town was laid out in blocks. The first house on Main Street was built in 1912. [Arkansas State Highway 392] is where Main Street was once located. The post office was closed in 1955. During its heyday, businesses included stores, hotels, a canning factory, a train depot, stockyards, mills, a corn gristmill, and a blacksmith shop. There was also a school and churches. By 1926, the passenger railroad stopped going through Batavia. While the community is larger in terms of population and homes than it was as an incorporated town, there are fewer businesses. Batavia township still exists (see township population history) without any current incorporated towns inside of it.

== Demographics ==
Historical population
Census	Pop.	Note	%±
2020	328		—
U.S. Decennial Census; 2020

=== 2020 census ===
Batavia CDP, Arkansas – Racial and ethnic composition Note: the US Census treats Hispanic/Latino as an ethnic category. This table excludes Latinos from the racial categories and assigns them to a separate category. Hispanics/Latinos may be of any race.
Race / Ethnicity (NH = Non-Hispanic)	Pop 2020	% 2020
White alone (NH)	304	92.68%
Black or African American alone (NH)	1	0.30%
Native American or Alaska Native alone (NH)	7	2.13%
Asian alone (NH)	1	0.30%
Pacific Islander alone (NH)	1	0.30%
Some Other Race alone (NH)	3	0.91%
Mixed Race or Multi-Racial (NH)	9	2.74%
Hispanic or Latino (any race)	2	0.61%
Total	328	100.00%
