= Ewing Township, Boone County, Arkansas =

Ewing Township
- Township
- Location in Arkansas
- Coordinates: 36°8′14.88″N 93°3′12.46″W
- Country: United States
- State: Arkansas
- County: Boone

Area
  - Total: 12.202 sq mi (31.60 km^{2})
  - Land: 12.196 sq mi (31.59 km^{2})
  - Water: 0.006 sq mi (0.016 km^{2})

Population (2010)
  - Total: 458
  - Density: 37.55/sq mi (14.50/km^{2})
- Time zone: UTC-6 (CST)
  - Summer (DST): UTC-5 (CDT)
- Zip Code: 72601 (Harrison)
- Area code: 870

Ewing Township is one of twenty current townships in Boone County, Arkansas, USA. As of the 2010 census, its total population was 458.

== Geography ==
According to the United States Census Bureau, Ewing Township covers an area of 12.202 square miles (31.60 km^{2}); 12.196 square miles (31.59 km^{2}) of land and 0.006 square miles (0.016 km^{2}) of water.

== Population history ==
| Census | Population |
|---|---|
| 2010 | 458 |
| 2000 | 389 |
| 1990 | 302 |
| 1980 | 270 |
| 1970 | not listed |
| 1960 | not listed |
| 1950 | 159 |
| 1940 | 231 |
| 1930 | 183 |
| 1920 | 223 |
| 1910 | 512 |
| 1900 | 612 |
| 1890 | 598 |
