= Capps, Arkansas =

- Unincorporated community
- Location within Arkansas Location within the United States
- Coordinates: 36°14′08″N 93°11′22″W
- Country: United States
- State: Arkansas
- County: Boone
- Elevation: 1,440 ft (440 m)
- Time zone: UTC-6 (Central (CST))
  - Summer (DST): UTC-5 (CDT)
- Area code: 870
- GNIS feature ID: 57506

Capps is an unincorporated community in Boone County, Arkansas, United States. Capps is located on Arkansas Highway 392, 4.6 miles (7.4 km) west of Harrison.
