= Omaha School District (Arkansas) =

School district in Arkansas

Location
- 522 W. College; Omaha, Arkansas 72662 United States
- Coordinates: 36°26′58.6″N 93°12′6.2″W

District information
- Type: Public
- Grades: K–12
- Budget: $4.3 million (2009-2010 academic year)

Students and staff
- Students: 469 (2009-2010 academic year)
- Student–teacher ratio: 9.98 (2009-2010 academic year)

Other information
- Website: www.omaha.school

Omaha School District is a public school district in Boone County, Arkansas, United States which serves the city of Omaha (Arkansas) and surrounding unincorporated areas within Boone County.

== Schools ==
Omaha High School serves ninth to twelfth grades. In the 2009–10 academic year, the total enrollment in the school was 185 and total full-time teachers was 24.60, with a teacher/student ratio of 7.52.

Omaha Elementary School serves pre-school to sixth grades. In the 2009–10 academic year, the total enrollment in the school was 284 and total full-time teachers was 22.40, with a teacher/student ratio of 12.68.

== Demographics ==
Within the geographic area covered by the Omaha School District, there were around 590 individuals under the age of 18, during the 2009–10 academic year.

== See also ==
- List of school districts in Arkansas
