= Zinc Township, Boone County, Arkansas =

Zinc Township
- Township
- Location in Arkansas
- Coordinates: 36°16′19.38″N 92°55′22.13″W
- Country: United States
- State: Arkansas
- County: Boone

Area
  - Total: 24.618 sq mi (63.76 km^{2})
  - Land: 24.563 sq mi (63.62 km^{2})
  - Water: 0.055 sq mi (0.14 km^{2})

Population (2010)
  - Total: 585
  - Density: 23.82/sq mi (9.20/km^{2})
- Time zone: UTC-6 (CST)
  - Summer (DST): UTC-5 (CDT)
- Zip Code: 72601 (Harrison)
- Area code: 870

Zinc Township is one of twenty current townships in Boone County, Arkansas, USA. As of the 2010 census, its total population was 585.

== Geography ==
According to the United States Census Bureau, Zinc Township covers an area of 24.618 square miles (63.76 km^{2}); 24.563 square miles (63.62 km^{2}) of land and 0.055 square miles (0.14 km^{2}) of water.

=== Cities, towns, and villages ===
- Zinc

== Population history ==
The numbers below include the population of the incorporated town of Zinc from 1920 forward.

Historical population
Census	Pop.	Note	%±
1920	287		—
1930	419		46.0%
1940	315		−24.8%
1950	350		11.1%
1960	292		−16.6%
1970	278		−4.8%
1980	462		66.2%
1990	416		−10.0%
2000	557		33.9%
2010	585		5.0%
