= Jefferson Township, Boone County, Arkansas =

Jefferson Township
- Township
- Location in Arkansas
- Coordinates: 36°8′35.52″N 92°58′11.3″W
- Country: United States
- State: Arkansas
- County: Boone

Area
  - Total: 15.581 sq mi (40.35 km^{2})
  - Land: 15.579 sq mi (40.35 km^{2})
  - Water: 0.002 sq mi (0.0052 km^{2})

Population (2010)
  - Total: 1,202
  - Density: 77.16/sq mi (29.79/km^{2})
- Time zone: UTC-6 (CST)
  - Summer (DST): UTC-5 (CDT)
- Zip Code: 72682 (Valley Springs)
- Area code: 870

Jefferson Township is one of twenty current townships in Boone County, Arkansas, USA. As of the 2010 census, its total population was 1,202.

== Geography ==
According to the United States Census Bureau, Jefferson Township covers an area of 15.581 square miles (40.35 km^{2}); 15.579 square miles (40.35 km^{2}) of land and 0.002 square miles (0.0052 km^{2}) of water.

=== Cities, towns, and villages ===
- Valley Springs

== Population history ==
The township was in Carroll County for the 1840 through 1860 censuses. The figures below include the incorporated town of Valley Springs.

Historical population
Census	Pop.	Note	%±
1840	425		—
1850	782		84.0%
1860	1,338		71.1%
1870	1,649		23.2%
1880	987		−40.1%
1890	1,119		13.4%
1900	1,147		2.5%
1910	996		−13.2%
1920	502		−49.6%
1930	441		−12.2%
1940	524		18.8%
1950	458		−12.6%
1960	388		−15.3%
1970	526		35.6%
1980	858		63.1%
1990	1,050		22.4%
2000	1,187		13.0%
2010	1,202		1.3%
