= Bergman, Arkansas =

Bergman
- Town
- Location of Bergman in Boone County, Arkansas.
- Coordinates: 36°18′46″N 93°00′42″W
- Country: United States
- State: Arkansas
- County: Boone
- Founded: August 4, 1905
- Incorporated: April 3, 1968

Government
  - Type: Council government
  - Mayor: Danny Farmer

Area
  - Total: 1.31 sq mi (3.38 km^{2})
  - Land: 1.31 sq mi (3.38 km^{2})
  - Water: 0 sq mi (0.00 km^{2})
- Elevation: 1,270 ft (390 m)

Population (2020)
  - Total: 426
  - Estimate (2025): 422 ▼
  - Density: 326.5/sq mi (126.08/km^{2})
- Time zone: UTC-6 (Central (CST))
  - Summer (DST): UTC-5 (CDT)
- ZIP code: 72615
- Area code: 870
- FIPS code: 05-05440
- GNIS feature ID: 2405247
- Website: townofbergman.com

Bergman is a town in Boone County, Arkansas, United States. The population was 426 at the 2020 census. It is part of the Harrison Micropolitan Statistical Area.

== Geography ==
According to the United States Census Bureau, the town has a total area of 3.4 km^{2} (1.3 sq mi), all land.

=== List of highways ===
- Arkansas Highway 7
- Arkansas Highway 281

== History ==
Areas very close to the current location of Bergman were known as Oregon Flat and Clabbie. There was also a town around one mile south of present-day Bergman called Keener. Keener was strong in the 1880s and had a population of about 1,000 people. But, Keener began to decline fast by 1892.

The town of Bergman was first incorporated on August 4, 1905. The name was derived from a Dr. Bergman, who provided the land and requested that it be named after her daughter. Miss Edith Bergman who was the daughter of Dr. Bergman (and hence the person who the town was named after) was the first postmistress.

Like a number of other towns in Boone County, Bergman was a railroad town. The White River Division Railway, which eventually was part of the Missouri Pacific Line, went through Bergman.

Before the increased prevalence of the automobile and better roads in the area such as Arkansas Highway 43 (which was built in 1927 and had been blacktopped by 1948), Bergman had a number of businesses and flourished as a small town.

The current incorporation took place on March 14, 1968. A new post office was located in Bergman in 1974.

Although Bergman has a school district as part of the Arkansas school consolidation of 1929, it is now largely a residential community.

== Demographics ==
Historical population
Census	Pop.	Note	%±
1970	249		—
1980	320		28.5%
1990	324		1.3%
2000	407		25.6%
2010	439		7.9%
2020	426		−3.0%
2025 (est.)	422	▼	−0.9%
U.S. Decennial Census

As of the census of 2010, there were 445 people, 162 households, and 118 families residing in the town. The population density was 120.9 people/km^{2} (313 people/mi^{2}). There were 169 housing units at an average density of 50.2 units/km^{2} (130 units/mi^{2}). The racial makeup of the town was 96.81% White, 0.49% Native American, 0.25% Asian, 0.25% Pacific Islander, 0.49% from other races, and 1.72% from two or more races. 0.74% of the population were Hispanic or Latino of any race.

There were 155 households, out of which 44.5% had children under the age of 18 living with them, 57.4% were married couples living together, 9.7% had a female householder with no husband present, and 28.4% were non-families. 26.5% of all households were made up of individuals, and 11.0% had someone living alone who was 65 years of age or older. The average household size was 2.63 and the average family size was 3.19.

In the town, the population was spread out, with 31.0% under the age of 18, 8.6% from 18 to 24, 31.9% from 25 to 44, 18.4% from 45 to 64, and 10.1% who were 65 years of age or older. The median age was 33 years. For every 100 females, there were 105.6 males. For every 100 females age 18 and over, there were 100.7 males.

The median income for a household in the town was $31,250, and the median income for a family was $37,708. Males had a median income of $27,778 versus $18,958 for females. The per capita income for the town was $13,928. About 7.3% of families and 10.6% of the population were below the poverty line, including 9.8% of those under age 18 and 21.4% of those age 65 or over.

== Education ==
Bergman, along with Zinc, is within the Bergman School District, which leads to graduation to Bergman High School.
