= East Richwoods, Arkansas =

- Unincorporated community
- Location within Arkansas Location within the United States
- Coordinates: 35°50′45″N 92°08′05″W
- Country: United States
- State: Arkansas
- County: Stone
- Elevation: 1,227 ft (374 m)
- Time zone: UTC-6 (Central (CST))
  - Summer (DST): UTC-5 (CDT)
- Area code: 870
- GNIS feature ID: 48775

East Richwoods is an unincorporated community in Stone County, Arkansas, United States. East Richwoods is located on Arkansas Highway 9, 1.8 miles (2.9 km) southwest of Mountain View. The H.S. Mabry Barn, which is listed on the National Register of Historic Places, is located in East Richwoods.
