= Long Creek Township, Searcy County, Arkansas =

Long Creek Township
- Township
- Location in Arkansas
- Coordinates: 35°55′23″N 92°29′16″W
- Country: United States
- State: Arkansas
- County: Searcy

Area
  - Total: 44.279 sq mi (114.68 km^{2})
  - Land: 44.219 sq mi (114.53 km^{2})
  - Water: 0.06 sq mi (0.16 km^{2})

Population (2010)
  - Total: 474
  - Density: 10.72/sq mi (4.14/km^{2})
- Time zone: UTC-6 (CST)
  - Summer (DST): UTC-5 (CDT)
- Zip Code: 72650 (Marshall)
- Area code: 870

Long Creek Township is one of fifteen current townships in Searcy County, Arkansas, USA. As of the 2010 census, its total population was 474.

== Geography ==
According to the United States Census Bureau, Long Creek Township covers an area of 44.279 square miles (114.68 km^{2}); 44.219 square miles (114.53 km^{2}) of land and 0.06 square miles (0.16 km^{2}) of water.
