= Omaha, Arkansas =

Town in Arkansas, United States

- Town
- Location of Omaha in Boone County, Arkansas.
- Coordinates: 36°27′30″N 93°11′28″W
- Country: United States
- State: Arkansas
- County: Boone
- Established: 1897

Area
  - Total: 0.39 sq mi (1.01 km^{2})
  - Land: 0.39 sq mi (1.01 km^{2})
  - Water: 0 sq mi (0.00 km^{2})
- Elevation: 1,362 ft (415 m)

Population (2020)
  - Total: 128
  - Estimate (2025): 132 ▲
  - Density: 328.2/sq mi (126.72/km^{2})
- Time zone: UTC-6 (Central (CST))
  - Summer (DST): UTC-5 (CDT)
- ZIP code: 72662
- Area code: 870
- FIPS code: 05-52160
- GNIS feature ID: 2407047
- Website: www.cityofomahaarkansas.gov

Omaha is a town in Boone County, Arkansas, United States. As of the 2020 census the population stood at 128. It is a rural community located approximately 10 miles from Branson, Missouri and 15 miles from Harrison. The town is part of the Harrison Micropolitan Statistical Area.

== Geography ==
According to the United States Census Bureau, the town has a total area of 0.4 square miles (1.0 km^{2}), all land.

=== Highway ===
- Arkansas Highway 14

== History ==
Omaha's first post office was set up on August 7, 1873. A census taken at the time showed there was a population of around 35 people.

By the year 1884, businesses included four steam saw mills, and four flour mills. In the year 1892, additional businesses included a saw and grist mill, general store, and a blacksmith shop.

An undated advertisement for Omaha indicated the town was along the Missouri Pacific Railroad and "State Highway 65". It further indicated the school had 450 students. The advertisement described churches of every main denomination, that the town had electric and telephone service, a bank, canning factory, feed stores, a machine shop, mill, a modern garage, lumber yards and various types of stores. The ad claimed the town was started in 1878 after J.H. Middleton of Missouri came and began a general store.

In the 1930s, the town attempted to qualify as a border city due to its proximity to the Arkansas/Missouri state line. Missouri's gas taxes are lower than Arkansas', thus Omaha tried to take advantage of the lower tax. That incorporation was found to be invalid by the state supreme court in 1941.

Old US 65 went through Omaha, causing travelers from further south in Arkansas (such as Harrison) to go through Omaha on the way to Missouri, and likewise for travelers heading further south from Missouri. Businesses along the route were able to thrive. Although the new U.S. Route 65, opened in late 1999, was judged to be safer and reduced travel time, it completely bypassed Omaha. Businesses deriving revenue from the tourist trade felt the impact on the first day of the new road opening. Ultimately, they were devastated. Some businesses planned to relocate to Branson at the time. Many noted that people will never even know Omaha exists. It was noted that old US 65 became so quiet that dogs could safely lie in the street.

Former University of Arkansas football All-American Brandon Burlsworth is buried at Gass Cemetery in Omaha.

== Demographics ==
Historical population
Census	Pop.	Note	%±
1880	38		—
1940	146		—
1950	91		−37.7%
1960	195		114.3%
1970	160		−17.9%
1980	191		19.4%
1990	207		8.4%
2000	165		−20.3%
2010	169		2.4%
2020	128		−24.3%
2025 (est.)	132	▲	3.1%
U.S. Decennial Census

As of the census of 2016, there were 171 people, 64 households, and 49 families residing in the town. The population density was 410.4 people per square mile(159.3/km^{2}) in 2010. There were 81 housing units at an average density of 202.9 per square mile (78.3/km^{2}). The racial makeup of the town was 95.76% White, 0.61% Black or African American, and 3.64% from two or more races.

There were 64 households, of which 37.9% had children under the age of 18 living with them, 53.0% were married couples living together, 19.7% had a female householder with no husband present, and 24.2% were non-families. 21.2% of all households were made up of individuals, and 9.1% had someone living alone who was 65 years of age or older. The average household size was 2.50 and the average family size was 2.94.

In the town, the population was spread out, with 28.5% under the age of 18, 12.1% from 18 to 24, 23.0% from 25 to 44, 26.7% from 45 to 64, and 9.7% who were 65 years of age or older. The median age was 31 years. For every 100 females, there were 111.5 males. For every 100 females aged 18 and over, there were 93.4 males.

The median income for a household in the town was $18,000, and the median income for a family was $30,000. Males had a median income of $22,188 versus $16,042 for females. The per capita income for the town was $12,636. About 32.0% of families and 31.3% of the population were below the poverty line, including 44.7% of those under the age of 18 and 41.4% of those 65 or over.

== Education ==
Public education is provided by the Omaha School District leading to graduation at Omaha High School.

The Omaha area has an eleven-building school. Consisting of a high school building with a gymnasium, this gym is known as the "new gym" or the "eagles' nest" though most often by the locals as the new gym, a fine arts building with an auditorium for stage performances a music room an art room and another classroom, the high school library/ home economics classroom (currently, the home ec. class is not in use yet), another gym known as the "old gym", the elementary building for grades one through fourth, the building right beside that for kindergarten and two other rooms, the elementary library, the middle school building that features grades fifth and six grade classrooms, the east lab, part of seventh and eighth grades classrooms, and some high school classrooms, finally, the preschool and nurses area, the computer lab and a second preschool area and another room, and finally the cafeteria. The cafeteria, elementary building, computer lab building, building beside the elementary, middle school building, and elementary library are all connected to each other with an outside walk way.

Omaha is within the Omaha School District.
