= Alpena, Arkansas =

- Town
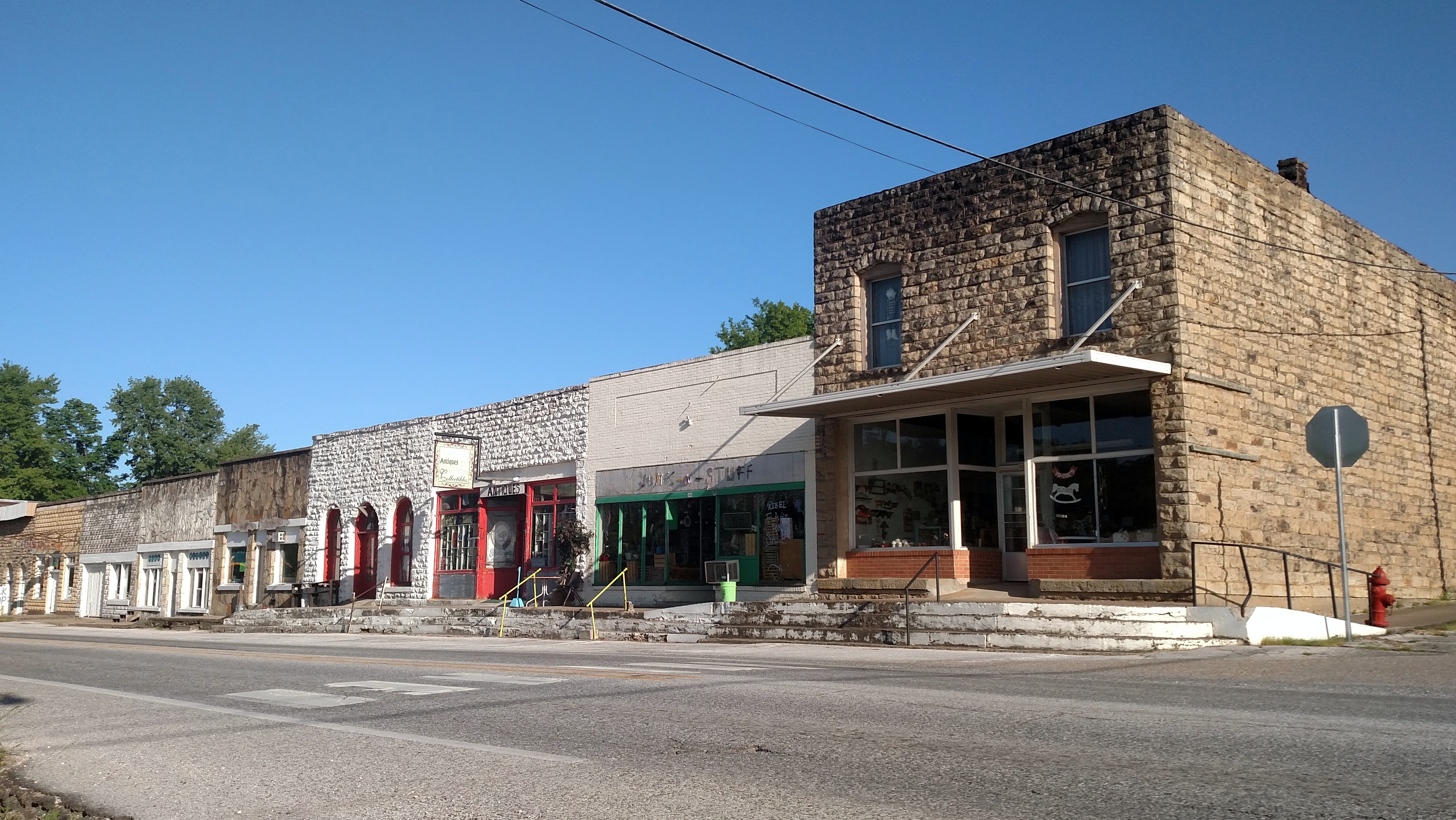
- Streetside in downtown Alpena

- Location of Alpena in Boone County and Carroll County, Arkansas.
- Coordinates: 36°17′23″N 93°18′13″W
- Country: United States
- State: Arkansas
- Counties: Boone, Carroll

Area
  - Total: 1.34 sq mi (3.47 km^{2})
  - Land: 1.33 sq mi (3.45 km^{2})
  - Water: 0.0039 sq mi (0.01 km^{2})
- Elevation: 1,224 ft (373 m)

Population (2020)
  - Total: 374
  - Estimate (2025): 388 ▲
  - Density: 280.7/sq mi (108.36/km^{2})
- Time zone: UTC-6 (Central (CST))
  - Summer (DST): UTC-5 (CDT)
- ZIP code: 72611
- Area code: 870
- FIPS code: 05-01060
- GNIS feature ID: 2405141
- Website: www.townofalpena.gov

Alpena /ælˈpiːnə/ is a town in Boone and Carroll counties in the U.S. state of Arkansas. The population was 374 at the 2020 census.

The Boone County portion of Alpena is part of the Harrison Micropolitan Statistical Area.

== History ==
Alpena Pass was founded in 1908 on top of a graveyard shortly after the Missouri and North Arkansas Railroad was built through Boone County. In the 1950s, the word "pass" was dropped from the name, thus creating the current name, Alpena.

At the time of the town's founding, the town of Carrollton was in decline. Many of the buildings of Carrollton were disassembled, moved and reassembled at Alpena Pass. MADtv's Rice and Beans Tour once came through the town, doing a tongue-in-cheek exposé about rural America. They encountered a seemingly drug-intoxicated woman and had an interview with the "mayor".

== Geography ==
According to the United States Census Bureau, the town has a total area of 3.5 km^{2} (1.4 sq mi), all land.

== Demographics ==
Historical population
Census	Pop.	Note	%±
1920	250		—
1930	361		44.4%
1940	313		−13.3%
1950	304		−2.9%
1960	283		−6.9%
1970	309		9.2%
1980	344		11.3%
1990	319		−7.3%
2000	371		16.3%
2010	392		5.7%
2020	374		−4.6%
2025 (est.)	388	▲	3.7%
U.S. Decennial Census

As of the census of 2000, there were 371 people, 146 households, and 95 families residing in the town. The population density was 105.3 people/km^{2} (273 people/mi^{2}). There were 170 housing units at an average density of 48.3 units/km^{2} (125 units/mi^{2}). The racial makeup of the town was 96.50% White, 2.16% Native American, 0.27% Asian, and 1.08% from two or more races. 2.43% of the population were Hispanic or Latino of any race.

There were 146 households, out of which 35.6% had children under the age of 18 living with them, 45.9% were married couples living together, 12.3% had a female householder with no husband present, and 34.9% were non-families. 31.5% of all households were made up of individuals, and 19.9% had someone living alone who was 65 years of age or older. The average household size was 2.54 and the average family size was 3.21.

In the town, the population was spread out, with 31.0% under the age of 18, 7.3% from 18 to 24, 26.1% from 25 to 44, 18.3% from 45 to 64, and 17.3% who were 65 years of age or older. The median age was 31 years. For every 100 females, there were 83.7 males. For every 100 females age 18 and over, there were 89.6 males.

The median income for a household in the town was $23,906, and the median income for a family was $28,333. Males had a median income of $29,000 versus $17,125 for females. The per capita income for the town was $13,429. About 7.3% of families and 13.3% of the population were below the poverty line, including 5.0% of those under age 18 and 29.4% of those age 65 or over.

== Education ==
The Boone County portion of Alpena, along with part of the Carroll County portion Alpena is within the Alpena School District, which leads to graduation from Alpena High School A small part of the Carroll County portion of Alpena is within the Green Forest School District.

== Climate ==
The climate in this area is characterized by hot, humid summers and generally mild to cool winters. According to the Köppen Climate Classification system, Alpena has a humid subtropical climate, abbreviated "Cfa" on climate maps.

== Transportation ==
=== Transit ===
While there is no fixed-route transit service in Alpena, intercity bus service is provided by Jefferson Lines in nearby Green Forest.

=== Roadways ===
- U.S. Highway 62
- US 412

== Notable people ==
- Brandon Burlsworth, All-American football player for the Arkansas Razorbacks, died in Alpena in 1999.
