= Boone County, Arkansas =

County in Arkansas, United States

- County
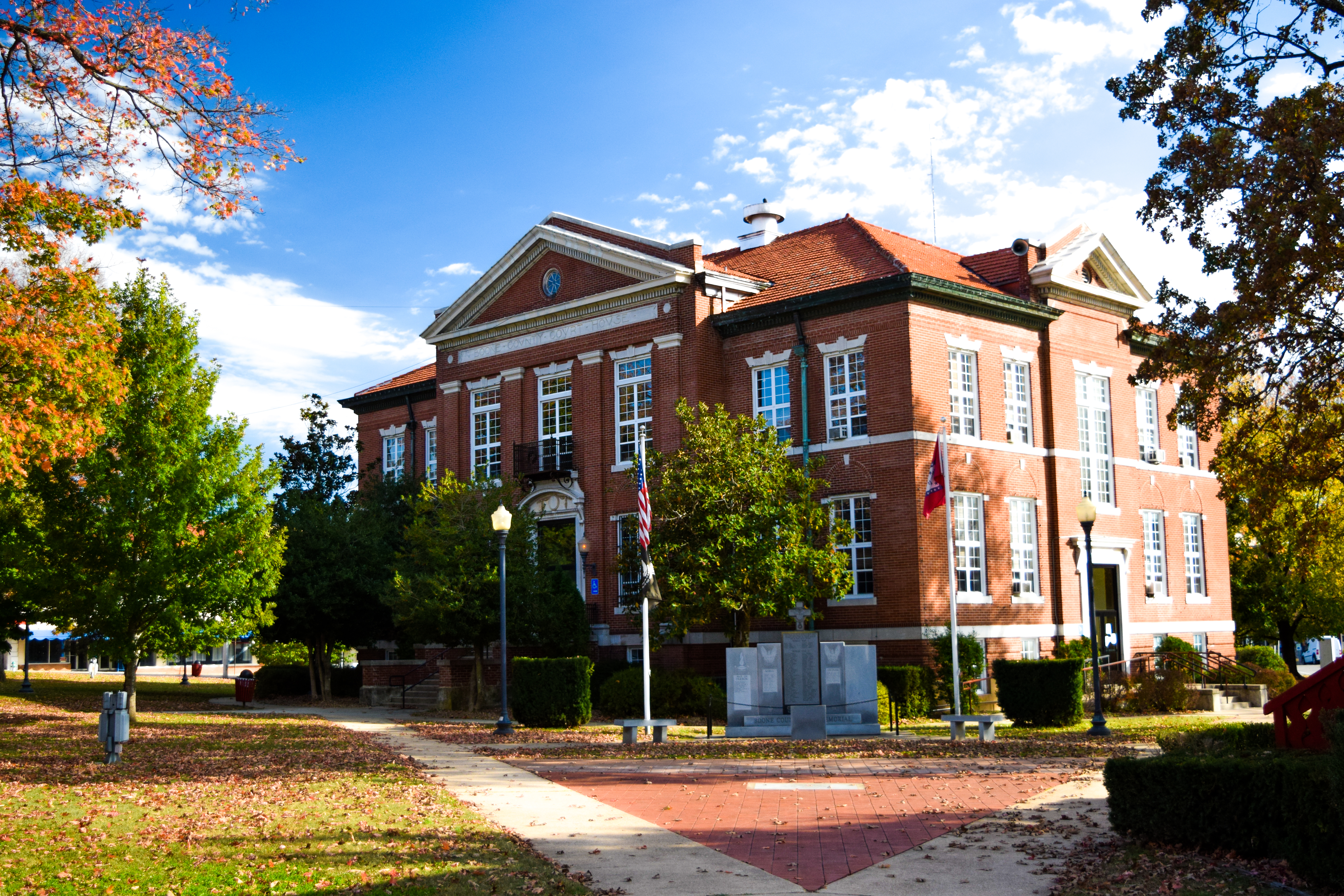
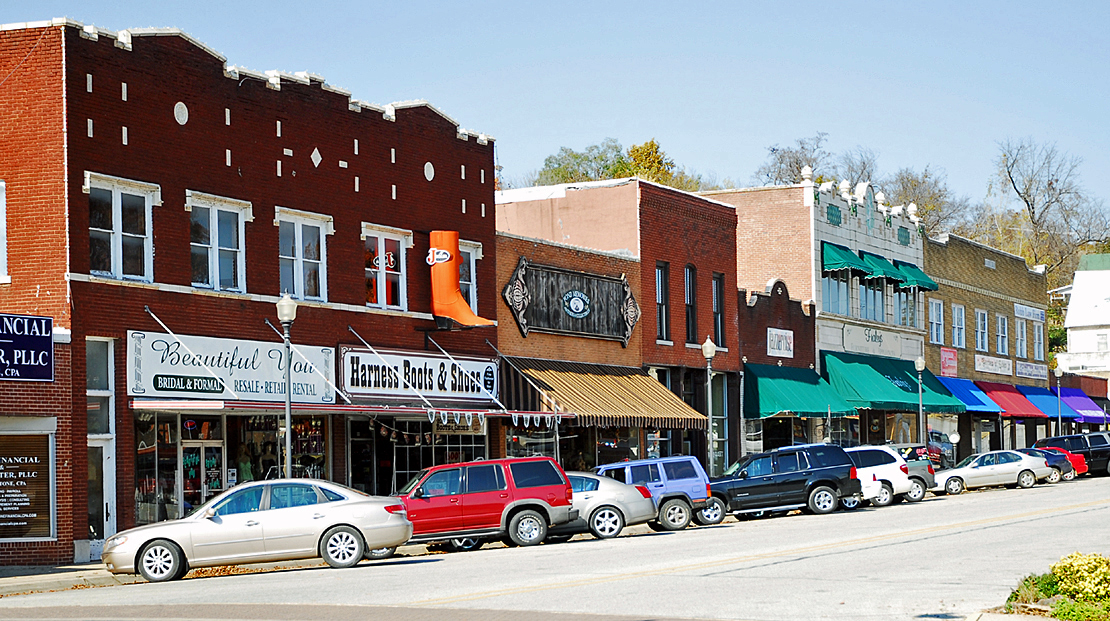
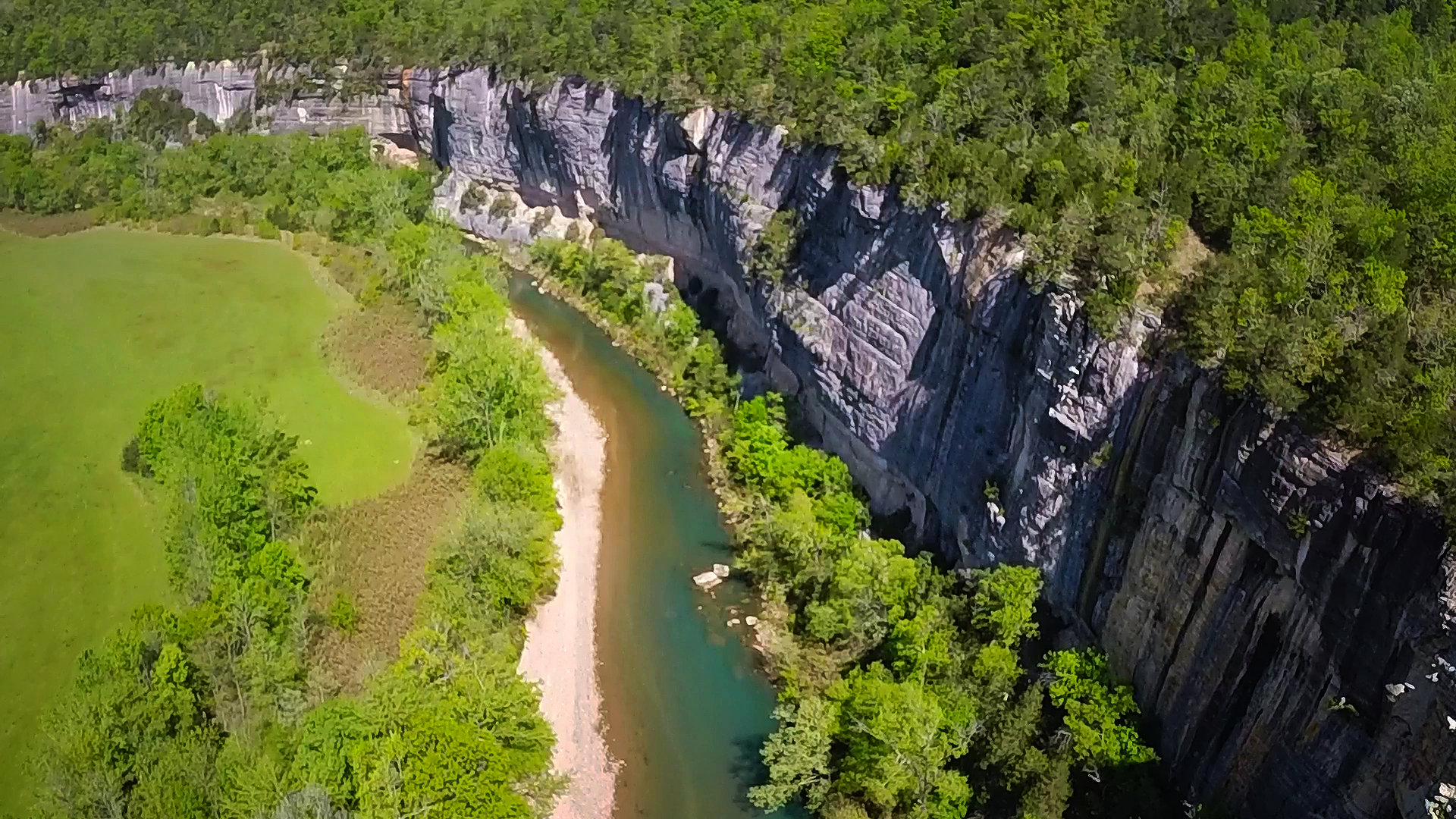
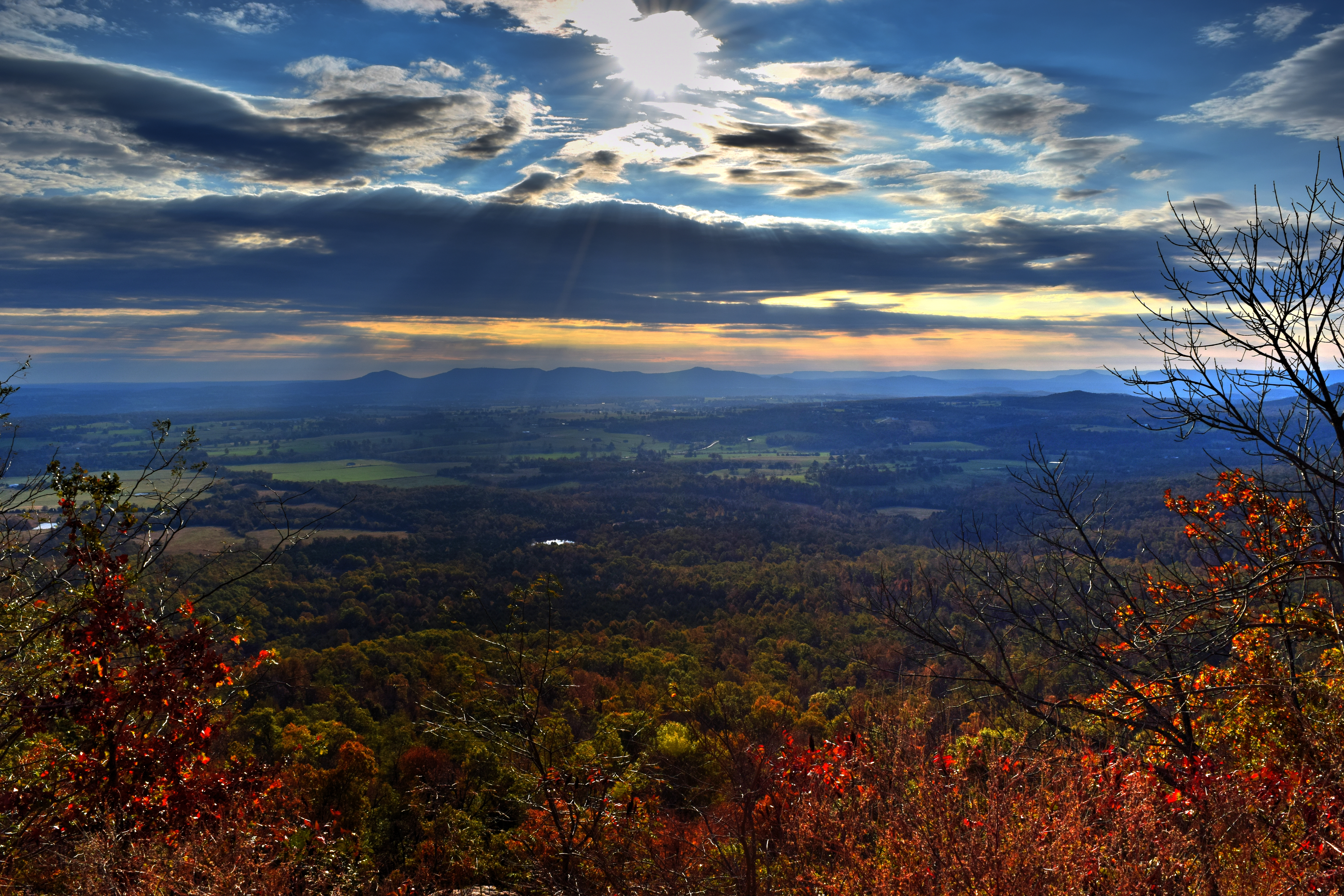
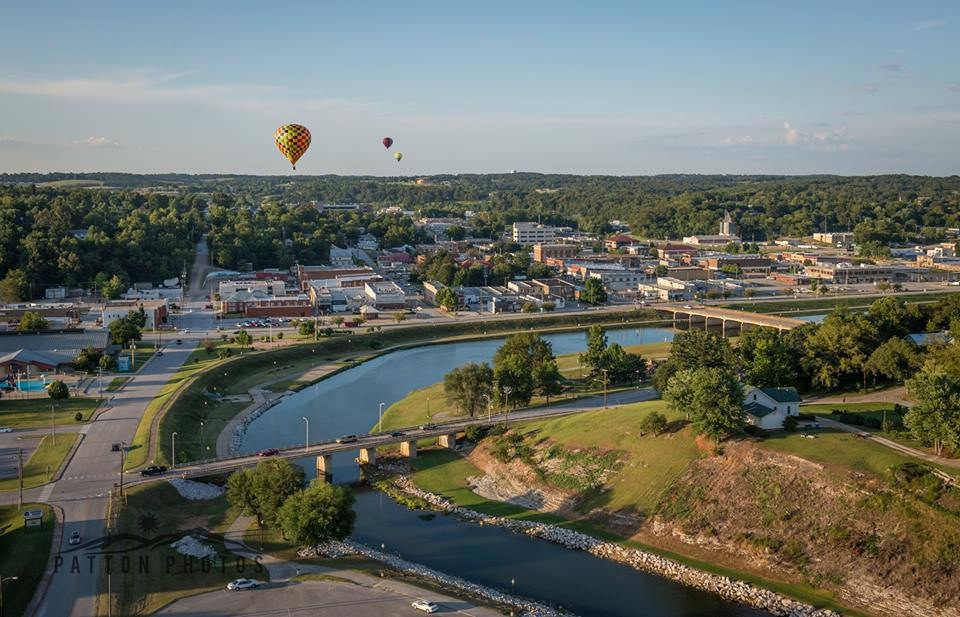
- Clockwise from top: Boone County Courthouse in Harrison, Buffalo National River, Lake Harrison Park, Overlook from Gaither Mountain in the Ozarks, Harrison Courthouse Square

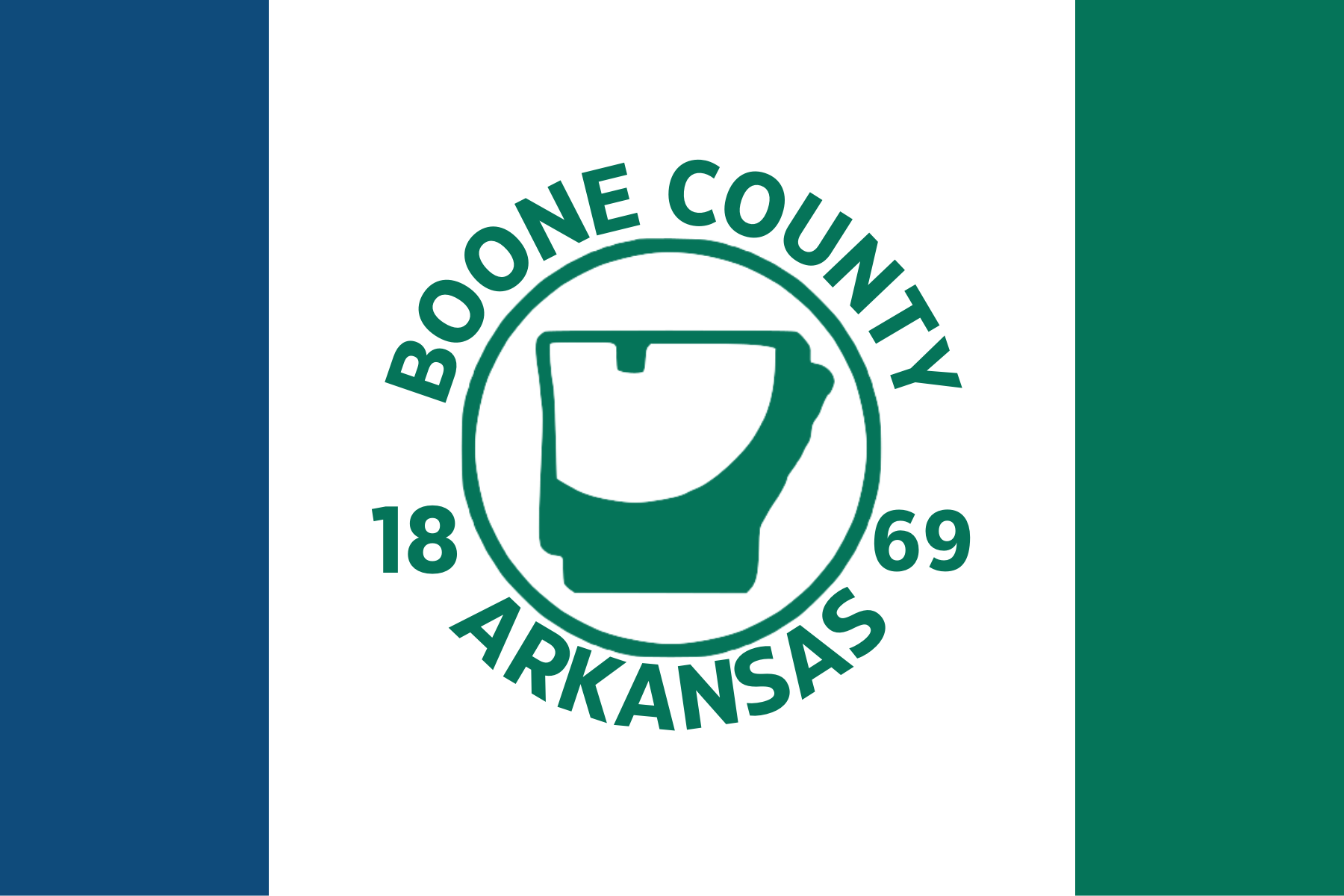
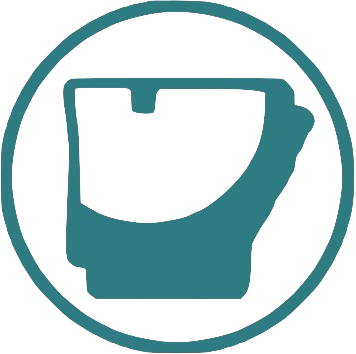
- Flag Seal

- Location within the U.S. state of Arkansas
- Coordinates: 36°18′22″N 93°05′38″W
- Country: United States
- State: Arkansas
- Founded: April 9, 1869
- Seat: Harrison
- Largest city: Harrison

Area
  - Total: 602 sq mi (1,560 km^{2})
  - Land: 590 sq mi (1,500 km^{2})
  - Water: 12 sq mi (31 km^{2}) 1.9%

Population (2020)
  - Total: 37,373
  - Estimate (2025): 38,628 ▲
  - Density: 63/sq mi (24/km^{2})
- Time zone: UTC−6 (Central)
  - Summer (DST): UTC−5 (CDT)
- Congressional district: 1st
- Website: www.boonecountyar.com

Boone County is a county located in the U.S. state of Arkansas, along the Missouri border. As of the 2020 census, the population was 37,373. The county seat is Harrison. It is Arkansas's 62nd county, formed on April 9, 1869.

Boone County is part of the Harrison, Arkansas, Micropolitan Statistical Area.

== History ==
Boone County was formed from the eastern portion of Carroll County. Contrary to popular belief, it was not named for frontiersman Daniel Boone. It was originally called Boon, since the residents believed it would be a "boon" to all who settled there. The county's first newspaper, begun in 1870, was the Boon County Advocate. However, when Governor Powell Clayton signed the act, creating the county 1869 it was titled An Act to Organize and Establish the County of Boone and for Other Purposes. So for whatever reason an "'e'" was added.

=== White supremacy ===
In 1905 and 1909, race riots were conducted to drive African-Americans out of the area. Boone County was marketed as an all-white sundown county into the 1920s. Boone County serves as the national headquarters of the white supremacy organization Knights of the Ku Klux Klan, led by Zinc resident Thomas Robb, who pastors a nearby Christian church. In 2017, Boone County Judge Robert Hathaway signed proclamations recognizing June as Confederate Heritage and History Month, and issued a similar proclamation for April 2019.

== Geography ==
According to the U.S. Census Bureau, the county has a total area of 602 square miles (1,560 km^{2}), of which 590 sq mi (1,500 km^{2}) is land and 12 sq mi (31 km^{2}) (1.9%) is water. The county is located in the northwest portion of the state, and borders Missouri to the north.

The county lies entirely within the Ozark Mountains. Rolling hills of the Springfield and Salem Plateaus characterize the majority of the topography, with the more rugged Boston Mountains lying just to the south. Isolated peaks of the Boston Mountain range are found in the south, including Boat Mountain, Pilot's Knob, and Gaither Mountain. Portions of Bull Shoals Lake and Table Rock Lake lie in the northeast and northwest corners, respectively.

=== Hydrology ===
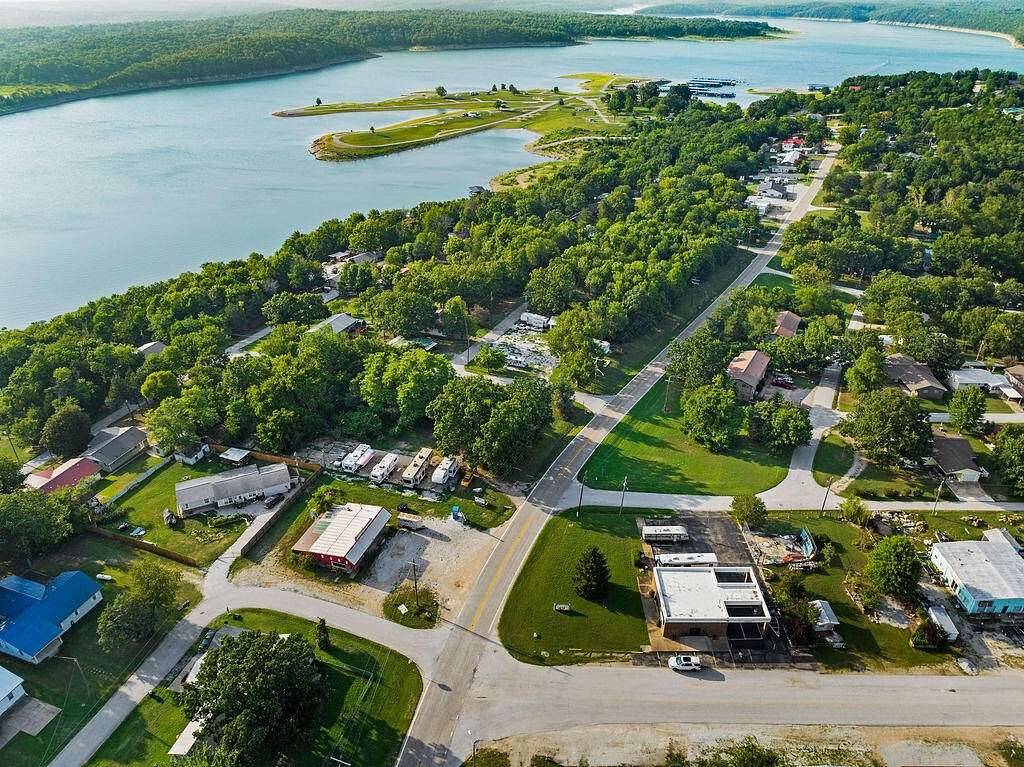
Diamond City located along Bull Shoals Lake

Boone County is predominantly located within the Bull Shoals Lake watershed, with a small segment west of US 65 within the Beaver Lake/Table Rock Lake watershed and a small area in the southwestern corner of the county serving as the headwaters of the Buffalo National River watershed. Crooked Creek drains much of Boone County to Bull Shoals Lake, with Long Creek and Osage Creek ultimately draining to Table Rock Lake.

=== Major highways ===
- US 62 / US 412
- U.S. Route 65
  - U.S. Route 65B
- Highway 7
- Highway 14
- Highway 43
- Highway 123
- Highway 206
- Highway 281
- Highway 392
- Highway 396
- Highway 397
- Highway 805
- Highway 980

=== Adjacent counties ===
- Taney County, Missouri (north)
- Marion County (east)
- Searcy County (southeast)
- Newton County (south)
- Carroll County (west)

== Demographics ==
Historical population
Census	Pop.	Note	%±
1870	7,032		—
1880	12,146		72.7%
1890	15,816		30.2%
1900	16,396		3.7%
1910	14,318		−12.7%
1920	16,098		12.4%
1930	14,937		−7.2%
1940	15,860		6.2%
1950	16,260		2.5%
1960	16,116		−0.9%
1970	19,073		18.3%
1980	26,067		36.7%
1990	28,297		8.6%
2000	33,948		20.0%
2010	36,903		8.7%
2020	37,373		1.3%
2025 (est.)	38,628	▲	3.4%
U.S. Decennial Census; 1790–1960 1900–1990

=== 2020 census ===
As of the 2020 census, the county had a population of 37,373. The median age was 43.0 years. 22.2% of residents were under the age of 18 and 21.7% of residents were 65 years of age or older. For every 100 females there were 96.0 males, and for every 100 females age 18 and over there were 93.0 males age 18 and over.

The racial makeup of the county was 91.3% White, 0.3% Black or African American, 0.7% American Indian and Alaska Native, 0.7% Asian, 0.1% Native Hawaiian and Pacific Islander, 0.7% from some other race, and 6.2% from two or more races. Hispanic or Latino residents of any race comprised 2.6% of the population.

37.3% of residents lived in urban areas, while 62.7% lived in rural areas.

There were 15,455 households in the county, of which 27.9% had children under the age of 18 living in them. Of all households, 50.5% were married-couple households, 17.7% were households with a male householder and no spouse or partner present, and 26.3% were households with a female householder and no spouse or partner present. About 28.9% of all households were made up of individuals and 14.1% had someone living alone who was 65 years of age or older.

There were 17,368 housing units, of which 11.0% were vacant. Among occupied housing units, 71.6% were owner-occupied and 28.4% were renter-occupied. The homeowner vacancy rate was 2.4% and the rental vacancy rate was 8.1%.

=== 2000 census ===
As of the 2000 census, there were 33,948 people, 13,851 households, and 9,861 families residing in the county. The population density was 57 inhabitants per square mile (22/km^{2}). There were 15,426 housing units at an average density of 26 per square mile (10/km^{2}). The racial makeup of the county was 97.60% White, 0.11% Black or African American, 0.71% Native American, 0.32% Asian, 0.02% Pacific Islander, 0.34% from other races, and 0.90% from two or more races. 1.06% of the population were Hispanic or Latino of any race.

There were 13,851 households, out of which 30.70% had children under the age of 18 living with them, 59.50% were married couples living together, 8.80% had a female householder with no husband present, and 28.80% were non-families. 25.60% of all households were made up of individuals, and 11.20% had someone living alone who was 65 years of age or older. The average household size was 2.41 and the average family size was 2.88.

In the county, the population was spread out, with 23.90% under the age of 18, 8.20% from 18 to 24, 26.50% from 25 to 44, 24.70% from 45 to 64, and 16.70% who were 65 years of age or older. The median age was 39 years. For every 100 females, there were 93.10 males. For every 100 females age 18 and over, there were 89.70 males.

The median income for a household in the county was $29,988, and the median income for a family was $34,974. Males had a median income of $27,114 versus $19,229 for females. The per capita income for the county was $16,175. About 10.70% of families and 14.80% of the population were below the poverty line, including 19.00% of those under age 18 and 12.90% of those age 65 or over.

== Education ==
=== Public school districts ===
School districts include:

- Alpena
- Bergman
- Harrison
- Lead Hill
- Omaha
- Valley Springs

=== Higher education ===
- North Arkansas College

== Government ==
The county government is a constitutional body granted specific powers by the Constitution of Arkansas and the Arkansas Code. The quorum court is the legislative branch of the county government and controls all spending and revenue collection. Representatives are called justices of the peace and are elected from county districts every even-numbered year. The number of districts in a county vary from nine to fifteen, and district boundaries are drawn by the county election commission. The Boone County Quorum Court has eleven members. Presiding over quorum court meetings is the county judge, who serves as the chief operating officer of the county. The county judge is elected at-large and does not vote in quorum court business, although capable of vetoing quorum court decisions.

Boone County, Arkansas Elected countywide officials
Position	Officeholder	Party
County Judge	Robert Hathaway	Republican
County Clerk	Crystal Graddy	Republican
Circuit Clerk	Judy Kay Harris	Republican
Sheriff	Roy Martin	Republican
Treasurer	Sandy Carter	Republican
Collector	Amy Jenkins	Republican
Assessor	Brandi Diffey	Republican
Coroner	Jake Mattix	Republican

The composition of the Quorum Court following the 2024 elections is 11 Republicans. Justices of the Peace (members) of the Quorum Court following the elections are:

- District 1: Matt Odom (R) of Harrison
- District 2: Glenn Redding (R) of Harrison
- District 3: Heath Kirkpatrick (R) of Harrison
- District 4: Bryan Snavely (R) of Harrison
- District 5: Kyle Evatt (R) of Harrison
- District 6: Sam Tinsley (R) of Harrison
- District 7: Rodney Sullins (R) of Everton
- District 8: Shane M. Jones (R) of Harrison
- District 9: Ralph H. Guynn (R) of Harrison
- District 10: Bill Melbourne (R) of Omaha
- District 11: David Thompson (R) of Lead Hill

Additionally, the townships of Boone County are entitled to elect their own respective constables, as set forth by the Constitution of Arkansas. Constables are largely of historical significance as they were used to keep the peace in rural areas when travel was more difficult. The township constables as of the 2024 elections are:

- City: Mike Cardiel (R)
- North: Fred Starnes (R)
- South: George A. White (R)

In state government, Boone County is represented by three members in the Arkansas House of Representatives and two in the Arkansas Senate. Arkansas House Districts 83, 98, and 99 cover parts of Boone County, as well as Arkansas Senate Districts 16 and 17.

At the federal level, Boone County is part of Arkansas's 1st US congressional district, currently represented by Rick Crawford.

Over the past few election cycles, Boone County has trended heavily towards the GOP. The last Democrat (as of 2024) to carry this county was then-Governor Bill Clinton in 1992, by only a 34-vote plurality.

United States presidential election results for Boone County, Arkansas
Year	Republican		Democratic		Third party(ies)	
Year	No.	%	No.	%	No.	%
1896	573	24.68%	1,730	74.50%	19	0.82%
1900	641	32.21%	1,338	67.24%	11	0.55%
1904	618	38.48%	910	56.66%	78	4.86%
1908	681	35.71%	1,149	60.25%	77	4.04%
1912	280	17.45%	965	60.12%	360	22.43%
1916	598	29.74%	1,413	70.26%	0	0.00%
1920	647	35.61%	1,106	60.87%	64	3.52%
1924	937	37.49%	1,350	54.02%	212	8.48%
1928	1,543	47.27%	1,708	52.33%	13	0.40%
1932	697	20.59%	2,644	78.11%	44	1.30%
1936	1,052	30.51%	2,386	69.20%	10	0.29%
1940	786	27.40%	2,054	71.59%	29	1.01%
1944	1,349	38.75%	2,132	61.25%	0	0.00%
1948	1,499	30.01%	3,190	63.86%	306	6.13%
1952	3,361	54.61%	2,786	45.26%	8	0.13%
1956	3,153	52.50%	2,829	47.10%	24	0.40%
1960	3,388	54.36%	2,774	44.51%	71	1.14%
1964	2,857	42.99%	3,770	56.73%	19	0.29%
1968	3,349	45.10%	1,907	25.68%	2,169	29.21%
1972	5,484	74.49%	1,862	25.29%	16	0.22%
1976	3,959	42.36%	5,388	57.64%	0	0.00%
1980	6,778	56.07%	4,576	37.86%	734	6.07%
1984	7,961	68.83%	3,356	29.01%	250	2.16%
1988	7,567	64.04%	3,998	33.84%	251	2.12%
1992	6,094	42.21%	6,128	42.45%	2,215	15.34%
1996	6,093	45.94%	5,745	43.32%	1,424	10.74%
2000	8,569	62.85%	4,493	32.95%	573	4.20%
2004	9,793	66.27%	4,640	31.40%	344	2.33%
2008	10,575	68.34%	4,435	28.66%	464	3.00%
2012	11,159	72.50%	3,772	24.51%	460	2.99%
2016	12,235	75.94%	2,926	18.16%	950	5.90%
2020	13,652	79.77%	3,064	17.90%	398	2.33%
2024	13,968	81.63%	2,854	16.68%	290	1.69%

== Communities ==
=== Cities ===
- Diamond City
- Harrison (county seat)

=== Towns ===
- Alpena (portions are also in Carroll County)
- Bellefonte
- Bergman
- Everton
- Lead Hill
- Omaha
- South Lead Hill
- Valley Springs
- Zinc

=== Census-designated place ===
- Batavia

=== Unincorporated communities ===
- Bear Creek Springs
- Capps
- Hopewell
- Little Arkansaw
- Self

=== Historic communities ===
- Elixir was a town in the vicinity of many springs. It was nearby present day Bergman. Heavy rains flooded the town in 1883, which was a major factor in its decline by 1892. In the 1880s, both Lead Hill and Elixir were expecting a railroad but none materialized. This also helped the town's decline. Although the town is gone, the township of Elixir remains and currently contains Bergman.
- Keener was a town around one mile south of present-day Bergman. Keener was strong in the 1880s and had a population of about 1,000 people. But, Keener began to decline fast by 1892.

=== Townships ===
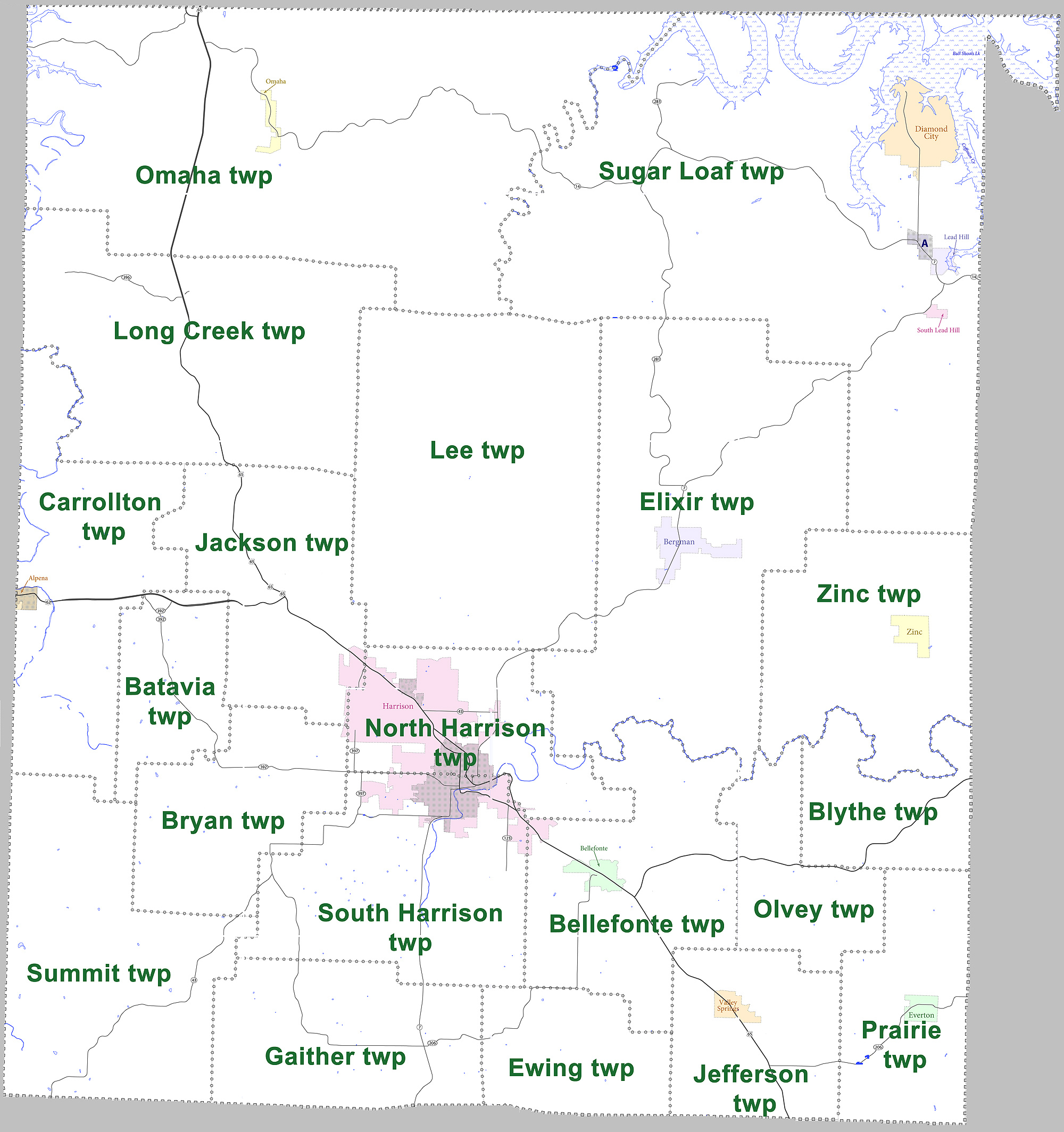
Townships in Boone County, Arkansas as of 2010

Townships in Arkansas are the divisions of a county. Each township includes unincorporated areas; some may have incorporated cities or towns within part of their boundaries. Arkansas townships have limited purposes in modern times. However, the United States census does list Arkansas population based on townships (sometimes referred to as "county subdivisions" or "minor civil divisions"). Townships are also of value for historical purposes in terms of genealogical research. Each town or city is within one or more townships in an Arkansas county based on census maps and publications. The townships of Boone County are listed below; listed in parentheses are the cities, towns, and/or census-designated places that are fully or partially inside the township.

Former townships include Bear Creek, Crooked Creek, Elmwood, Harrison, Washington, and Young.

Township	FIPS code	ANSI code (GNIS ID)	Population center(s)	Pop. (2010)	Pop. density (/mi^{2})	Pop. density (/km^{2})	Land area (mi^{2})	Land area (km^{2})	Water area (mi^{2})	Water area (km^{2})	Geographic coordinates
Batavia	05-90144	00069604		911	85.48	33	10.658	27.60	0.027	0.06993	36.260817°N 93.235402°W
Bellefonte	05-90219	00069605	Bellefonte, Harrison	2380	93.94	36.27	25.334	65.61	0.047	0.1217	36.202472°N 93.032619°W
Blythe	05-90375	00069606		245	20.76	8.01	11.803	30.57	0.054	0.1399	36.216733°N 92.942489°W
Bryan	05-90507	00069607	Harrison	1018	57.03	22.02	17.621	45.64	0.018	0.04662	36.205811°N 93.204652°W
Carrollton	05-90678	00069608	Alpena	843	32.5	12.55	25.935	67.17	0.214	0.5543	36.300254°N 93.273003°W
Elixir	05-91224	00069609	Bergman	2802	53.88	20.80	52.002	134.7	0.051	0.1321	36.318389°N 93.008130°W
Ewing	05-91260	00069610		458	37.55	14.50	12.196	31.59	0.006	0.01554	36.137467°N 93.053462°W
Gaither	05-91404	00069611		676	32.20	12.43	20.991	54.37	0.014	0.03626	36.147993°N 93.157690°W
Jackson	05-91848	00069612	Harrison	1340	61.64	23.80	21.739	56.30	0.006	0.01554	36.305402°N 93.190094°W
Jefferson	05-91914	00069613	Valley Springs	1202	77.16	29.79	15.579	40.35	0.002	0.005180	36.143199°N 92.969805°W
Lee	05-92133	00069614		1867	40.73	15.73	45.837	118.7	0.004	0.01036	36.326795°N 93.105766°W
Long Creek	05-92268	00069615		902	22.75	8.78	39.655	102.7	0.071	0.1839	36.379488°N 93.214209°W
North Harrison	05-92715	00069616	Harrison	8057	475.82	183.70	16.933	43.86	0.055	0.1424	36.250321°N 93.102318°W
Olvey	05-92757	00069617		440	37.27	14.39	11.807	30.58	0.013	0.03367	36.198738°N 92.959986°W
Omaha	05-92760	00069618	Omaha	2267	29.07	11.22	77.985	202.0	1.001	2.593	36.463258°N 93.173287°W
Prairie	05-92979	00069619	Everton	444	27.36	10.54	16.266	42.13	0.006	0.01554	36.155294°N 92.915207°W
South Harrison	05-93435	00069620	Harrison	7590	280.06	108.14	27.101	70.19	0.074	0.1917	36.190474°N 93.134539°W
Sugar Loaf	05-93522	00069621	Diamond City, Lead Hill, South Lead Hill	2320	27.61	10.66	84.026	217.6	9.806	25.40	36.414687°N 92.967603°W
Summit	05-93552	00069622		556	17.27	6.59	32.201	83.40	0.076	0.1968	36.170125°N 93.250788°W
Zinc	05-94134	00069623	Zinc	585	23.82	9.20	24.563	63.62	0.055	0.1424	36.272049°N 92.922813°W
Source: U.S. Census Bureau

== Chronic wasting disease ==
Chronic wasting disease has been found in Boone County as well as Benton, Carroll, Johnson, Madison, Marion, Newton, Pope, Searcy, Sebastian, Scott, and Washington counties.

== See also ==
- Arkansas Highway 397 (1973–1980)
- List of lakes in Boone County, Arkansas
- National Register of Historic Places listings in Boone County, Arkansas
- List of sundown towns in the United States
