= Special routes of U.S. Route 65 =

Special routes of U.S. Route 65

Highway system
- United States Numbered Highway System; List; Special; Divided

A total of eight special routes of U.S. Route 65 exist, divided between the U.S. states of Arkansas and Missouri. Currently, they are all business loops, although a spur route in Pine Bluff, Arkansas and bypass routes in Baton Rouge, Louisiana and Springfield, Missouri both existed in the past.

== Pine Bluff business loop ==
U.S. Highway 65B
- Location: Pine Bluff, AR
- Existed: August 1999–present

U.S. Highway 65 Business (US 65B) is an expressway serving as a business route of U.S. Route 65 through Pine Bluff, Arkansas. It was designated in August 1999 when the Pine Bluff bypass opened to traffic. US 65 was rerouted onto the new bypass.

== Conway business route ==
U.S. Highway 65B
- Location: Conway, AR
- Length: 4.22 mi (6.79 km)
- Existed: 1960s–present

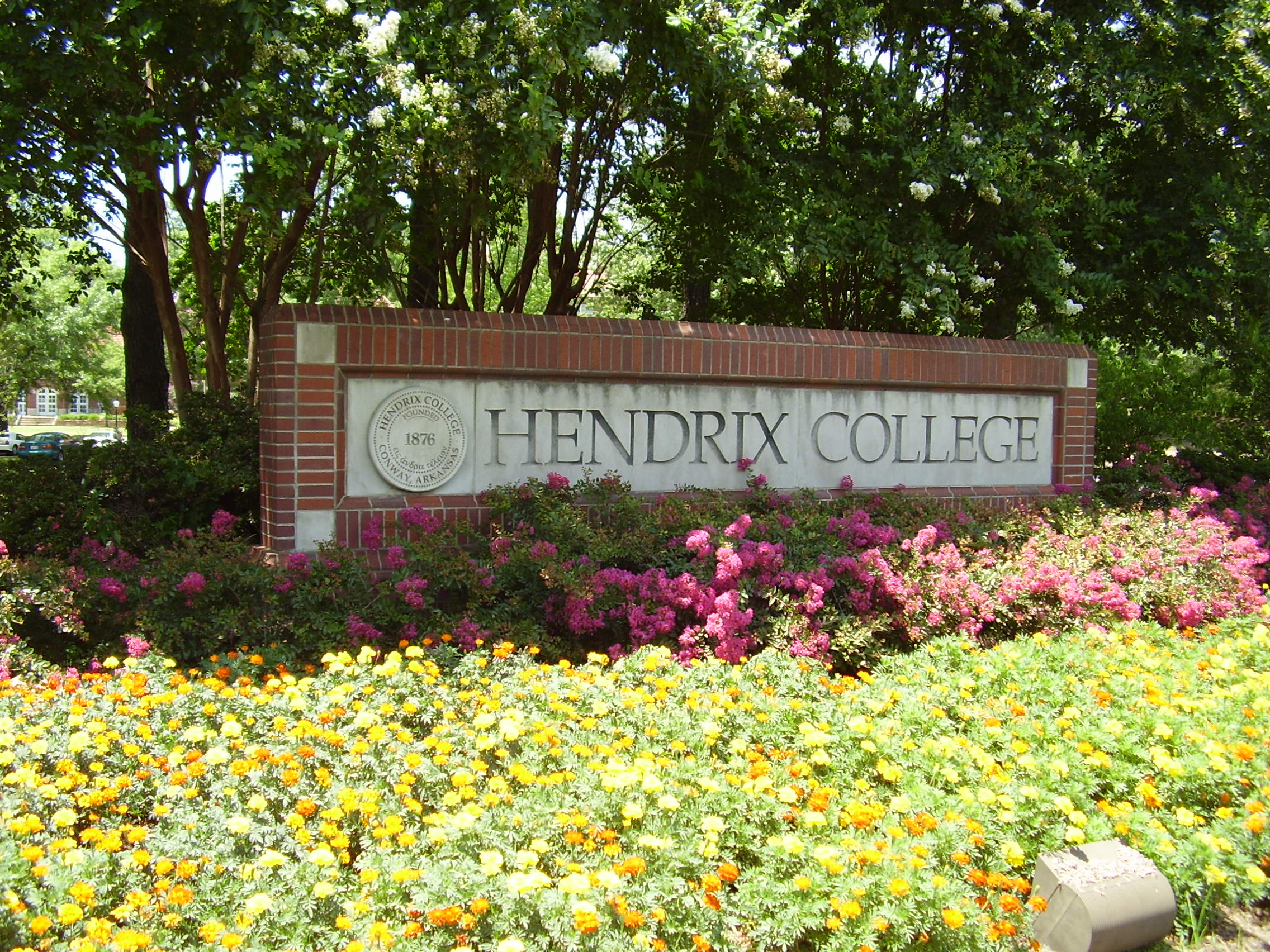
US 65B passes through the campus of Hendrix College during its Conway routing.

U.S. Highway 65 Business (US 65B) is a 4.22-mile (6.79 km) business route of U.S. Route 65 in Faulkner County, Arkansas. The route's northern terminus is at Interstate 40/US 65 in north Conway. It runs south through Conway beginning as Skyline Drive to intersect Old Morrilton Highway (US 64). These two routes overlap and run south as Harkrider Street. Continuing south US 64/US 65B approach a roundabout entrance to Hendrix College and continue to pass by Galloway Hall and several other campus buildings. Exiting the south part of campus at another roundabout intersection with Siebenmorgan Road (AR 266), the two routes continues south for several blocks before US 64 breaks east to end the concurrency.

US 65B continues south near Dennis F. Cantrell Field and Oak Grove Cemetery before an interchange with Arkansas Highway 60 and Arkansas Highway 365 in south Conway. The route turns east and runs until an interchange with I-40/US 65, where it continues as Arkansas Highway 286.

Major intersections

The entire route is in Conway, Faulkner County.

mi	km	Destinations	Notes
4.30	6.92	AR 286 east (Dave Ward Drive)	Continuation east
4.30	6.92	I-40 (US 65) – Little Rock, Fort Smith	Exit 129B on I-40
3.83	6.16	AR 60 west / AR 365 south	Interchange; eastern terminus of AR 60; northern terminus of AR 365
1.56	2.51	US 64 east (Oak Street)	Southern end of US 64 concurrency
1.05	1.69	Siebenmorgen Road (AR 266 east)	Roundabout
0.28	0.45	US 64 west (Old Morrilton Highway)	Northern end of US 64 concurrency
0.00	0.00	I-40 / US 65 – Fort Smith, Greenbrier, Harrison	Northern terminus; exit 125 on I-40
1.000 mi = 1.609 km; 1.000 km = 0.621 mi: Concurrency terminus

== Clinton business route ==
U.S. Highway 65B
- Location: Clinton, AR
- Length: 1.09 mi (1.75 km)
- Existed: 1960s–present

U.S. Highway 65 Business (US 65B) is a 1.09-mile (1.75 km) business route of U.S. Route 65 in Van Buren County, Arkansas. The route's northern terminus is at US 65/AR 9 in north Clinton. It runs south through Clinton, past the Clinton Cemetery. Continuing south, US 65B passes the Joclin-Bradley-Bowling House and the Patterson, Walter, Filling Station, which are both listed on the National Register of Historic Places. US 65B also passes within a block of the Van Buren County Courthouse, south of which the route terminates at US 65/AR 9.

Major intersections

The entire route is in Clinton, Van Buren County.

mi	km	Destinations	Notes
0.00	0.00	US 65 / AR 9	northern terminus
0.54	0.87	AR 95 south	
1.09	1.75	US 65 / AR 9	southern terminus
1.000 mi = 1.609 km; 1.000 km = 0.621 mi

== Western Grove business route ==
U.S. Highway 65B
- Location: Western Grove, AR
- Length: 1.19 mi (1.92 km)
- Existed: 1967–present

U.S. Highway 65 Business (US 65B) is a 1.19-mile (1.92 km) business route of U.S. Route 65 in Newton County, Arkansas. The route's northern terminus is at US 65 in northern Western Grove. It runs south through downtown Western Grove, passing the post office and Western Grove High School. South of the high school, US 65B runs south to terminate at US 65 and Arkansas Highway 123.

History

This roadway was originally part of U.S. Route 65 until 1967, when a bypass was built around Western Grove. The main route was rerouted onto the bypass, with the downtown alignment becoming US 65 Business.

Route description

The entire route is in Western Grove, Newton County.

mi	km	Destinations	Notes
0.00	0.00	US 65	northern terminus
1.19	1.92	US 65 / AR 123 west	southern terminus
1.000 mi = 1.609 km; 1.000 km = 0.621 mi

== Harrison business route ==
U.S. Highway 65B
- Main Street
- Location: Harrison, AR
- Length: 3.39 mi (5.46 km)
- Existed: 1960s–present

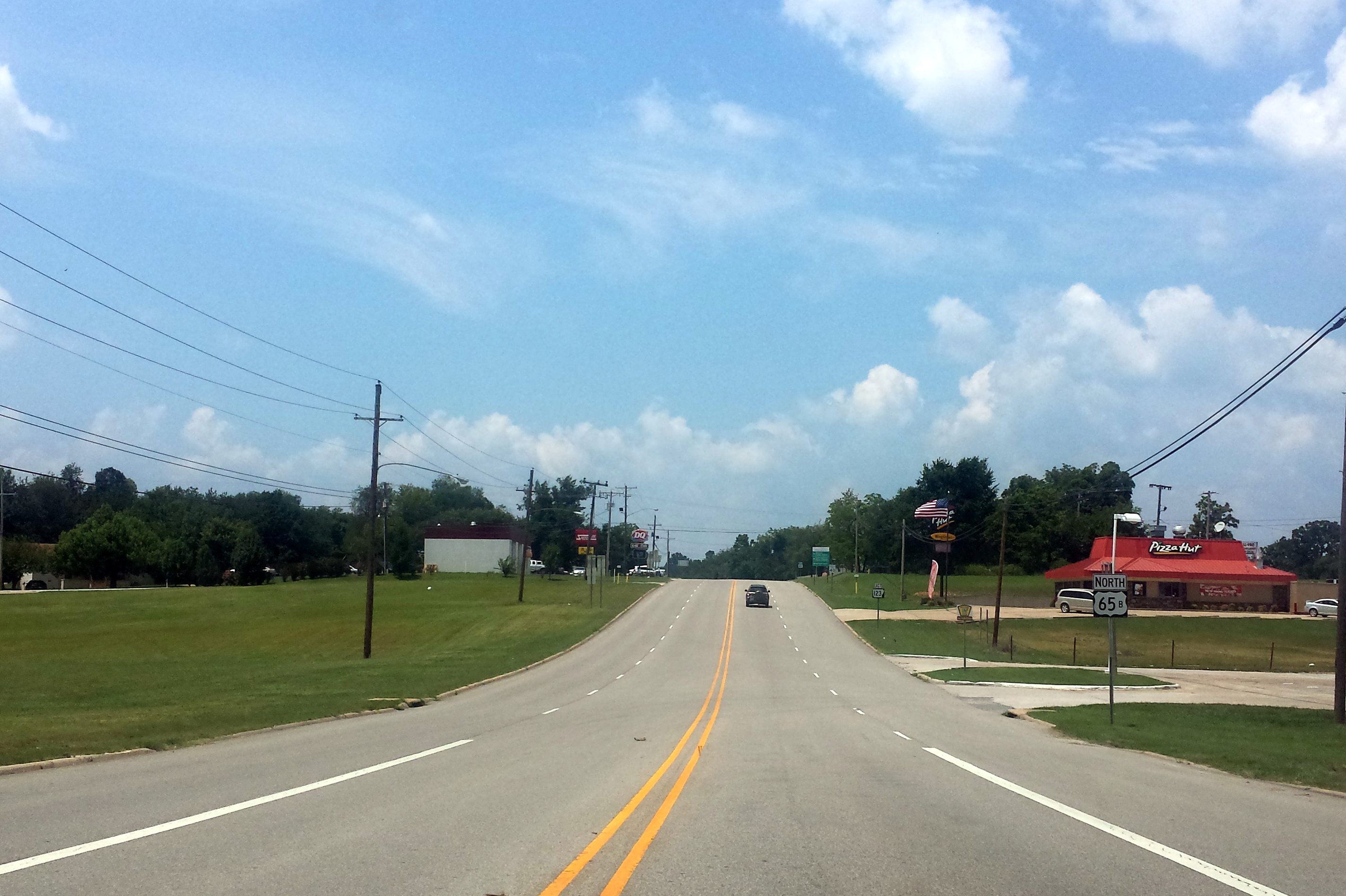
US 65B in Harrison

U.S. Highway 65 Business (US 65B or Main Street in Harrison) is a 3.39-mile (5.46 km) business route of U.S. Route 65 in Boone County, Arkansas. The route's northern terminus is at US 62/US 65/US 412 in north Harrison. In its role as Main Street, US 65B serves many historic buildings along its route through the historic center of Harrison. The route passes Hotel Seville and the Harrison Courthouse Square Historic District, the center of which is the Boone County Courthouse. Just west of Main Street's intersection with Central Avenue is the Boone County Jail, where Henry Starr died of wounds inflicted by a rifle while attempting to rob a Harrison bank.

South of Crooked Creek, the route winds east to serve the fairgrounds and North Arkansas College before terminating at US 62/US 65/US 412.

History

The route was designated in the 1960s. It was repaved entirely in 1975.

Major intersections

The entire route is in Harrison, Boone County.

mi	km	Destinations	Notes
0.00	0.00	US 62 / US 65 / US 412 (Arkmo Drive)	northern terminus
1.78	2.86	AR 7 (Central Avenue)	
3.13	5.04	AR 123 south	access to North Arkansas Community College
3.39	5.46	US 62 / US 65 / US 412	southern terminus
1.000 mi = 1.609 km; 1.000 km = 0.621 mi

== Branson business loop ==
U.S. Route 65 Business
- Location: Point Lookout, MO–Branson, MO
- Length: 4.1 mi (6.6 km)

U.S. Route 65 Business in the Branson area southern terminus begins in Point Lookout, Missouri at a Single-point urban interchange, which serves Point Lookout, College of the Ozarks, and Hollister, Missouri. Business 65 tracks west approximately 1,000 feet to an intersection with County Road 165 (south to the Table Rock Dam) and Opportunity Avenue (west to College of the Ozarks). Business 65 then turns right heading north, then on an overpass over US 65, toward Hollister. Next to the overpass lies the original southern terminus; removed when US 65 was upgraded to a 4-lane Expressway south of Lake Taneycomo. Business 65 then descends into the Turkey Creek Valley through historic downtown Hollister; crossing Turkey Creek north of downtown. Shortly after the Turkey Creek bridge, Business 65 is the western terminus of Missouri BB, which runs east toward the Hollister High School. Business 65 continues North to a Roundabout in the southeast bank of Lake Taneycomo, where it intersects with Missouri 76 (east to Forsyth, Missouri) and Branson Landing Boulevard; continuing with Missouri 76 west over the Lake Taneycomo Bridge, entering historic downtown Branson, Missouri.

Signage in Branson then takes Business 65, concurrent with Missouri 76, through downtown, then heads west by turning left at Main Street. Business 65/Missouri 76 then ascends what is locally known as "Hamburger Hill" (due to all of the Hamburger restaurants on either side of the roadway) to an interchange at US 65. Business 65 eastern terminus, thus, is at US 65, while Missouri 76 turns north, concurrently, with US 65. Continuing straight ahead will take you to 76 Country Boulevard, locally known as "The 76 Strip" or simply "The Strip." Business 65 originally continued straight onto Veterans Boulevard, instead of turning onto Main Street. It then continued until Veterans Boulevard until ending at US 65/Missouri 248/Shepherd of the Hills Expressway interchange. Business 65 was moved to its current alignment with the completion of the Branson Landing development in 2008. Some online maps still sign this alignment as Business 65. Also, a Business 65 bannered shield is attached to the side of the Roark Creek bridge just north of downtown; however, the sign cannot be seen from the roadway itself.

== Ozark business loop ==
U.S. Route 65 Business
- Location: Ozark, MO
- Length: 3.9 mi (6.3 km)

U.S. Route 65 Business southern terminus in Ozark, is at an interchange on the south side of town with US 65 and Missouri Route F. Business 65 runs east, past a Walmart Supercenter, among other stores, for about 1.4 miles. At the intersection of Business 65 and Missouri State Highway 14 (east to Sparta), both highways turn north concurrently toward downtown Ozark on what is also known as 3rd street. The route continues for 1.5 miles, mostly descending into the Finley River valley. Business 65/Route 14 then turn West onto Jackson Street, promptly crossing over the Finley River Bridge. The highways continue west for about 1 mile to an interchange at US 65; along the way, Business 65/Route 14 is the southern terminus for Missouri Route NN/9th street, which runs north to the Ozark High School. At US 65, Business 65 ends, while Route 14 continues west toward Nixa and US 160/Route 13.

== Springfield business loop ==
U.S. Route 65 Business
- Location: Springfield, MO
- Length: 8.9 mi (14.3 km)

U.S. Route 65 Business in Springfield parallels US 65, which follows the Schoolcraft Freeway along the east edge of town, for its entire length. Route 65 Business begins at an interchange with US 60, the James River Freeway. For most of its length, the route follows Glenstone Avenue, a major retail corridor in Springfield. Glenstone Avenue is an expressway from US 60 to Battlefield Road. At the corner of Battlefield and Glenstone lies Battlefield Mall, the region's largest shopping mall.

Business 65 continues north as a four-lane arterial road. At Sunshine Street, it serves as the western terminus of Route D. Route 65 Business continues along Glenstone until the intersection with Chestnut Expressway, where it meets I-44 Business. Eastbound I-44 BUS turns north from Chestnut onto Glenstone at this intersection, while Business 65 turns east onto Chestnut. Thus, the two routes do not truly intersect; all motorists must make a turn to continue on the numbered route that they were previously on. Business 65 then proceeds eastward along Chestnut Expressway until it intersects with mainline US-65, where the business route terminates. Originally, Business 65 continued north on Glenstone to Interstate 44; the routing was shifted when Chestnut Expressway east of Glenstone was turned over to MoDOT by the city in exchange for Division Street (previously Missouri YY between US 65 and Glenstone).

== Marshall business loop ==
U.S. Route 65 Business
- Location: Marshall, Missouri

== Carrollton business loop ==
U.S. Route 65 Business
- Location: Carrollton, Missouri
- Length: 2.5 mi (4.0 km)

== Trenton business loop ==
U.S. Route 65 Business
- Location: Trenton, Missouri

U.S. Highway 65 Business starts at the junctions of Missouri Route 6 and US 65 and runs west a few hundred yards before turning north onto Oklahoma Avenue. It follows Oklahoma Avenue north to the junction of Oklahoma Avenue and 28th Street where it turns east and terminates at US 65. Grundy County route AA is now signed concurrently with Business 65 from Oklahoma Ave eastward to US highway 65

== Former routes ==
=== Baton Rouge bypass route ===
U.S. Highway 65 Bypass
- Location: Baton Rouge
- Length: 10.4 mi (16.7 km)
- Existed: 1941–1951

U.S. Highway 65 Bypass (US 65 Byp.) ran 10.4 miles (16.7 km) around Baton Rouge, the capital city of Louisiana. It entirely duplicated the path of US 61 Byp. and existed during the period that US 65 was co-signed with US 61 between New Orleans, Louisiana and Natchez, Mississippi. The route followed the Airline Highway around what was then the outside of town, allowing through traffic from the south and east to access the Mississippi River Bridge while avoiding the downtown area. The bypass is now part of mainline US 61 and US 190.

=== Pine Bluff spur route ===
U.S. Highway 65S
- Location: Pine Bluff, Arkansas
- Existed: yes
