= George Floyd protests in Arkansas =

2020 civil unrest after the murder of George Floyd

- Part of George Floyd protests
- Date: May 28 – July 2020 (1 month and 3 days)
- Location: Arkansas, United States
- Caused by: Police brutality; Institutional racism against African Americans; Reaction to the murder of George Floyd; Economic, racial and social inequality

Cities in Arkansas in which a protest with about 100 or more participants was held

This is a list of George Floyd protests in Arkansas, United States. Through July 2020, protests occurred in at least thirteen various communities in the state.

== Locations ==
=== Bentonville ===
On June 1, protesters gathered at the Bentonville Town Square; the protest was originally postponed from the original date after receiving online threats, however, over 1,000 individuals still showed up to protest. During the daylight, the protest was peaceful. However, right before sunset the Benton County Sheriff's Office warned the protesters to disperse, declaring the protest to be unlawful and posting officers in riot gear at the front of the Court House Steps. After the protesters did not disperse, the Benton County Sheriff's Office began releasing tear gas and firing beanbag rounds into the crowd. After this, protesters threw water bottles at the officers who were standing on the steps of the Benton County Court House. After having been struck by water bottles and having "threatening language" thrown their way, more tear gas was deployed at the front of the square. It was during this time back up from multiple surrounding agencies arrived to support the BCSO. One group seemed to be in military uniform, with batons and a rile strapped to their front, while others only carried large batons. Most protesters left following this, but the protesters continuously returned to continue protesting in front of the Benton County Court House.

Right before 11pm, when the park was set to close, the officers again declared the protest to be unlawful, and told the crowd that they could be arrested if they continued to remain in the area. Fireworks were then set off by an unknown agitator, and tear gas was once again deployed in front of the Court House, as well as at the back of the square. At this time the Benton County Sheriff's Office blocked re-entry into the square, using officers holding batons to stand in front of the roadways and re-deploying tear gas to ensure protesters remained out of the square. Almost all protesters left at this time. After the protest, the Benton County Sheriff's Office reported damage to police vehicles.

=== Cabot ===
On June 4, hundreds of protesters peacefully marched from Plaza Boulevard to the Cabot Police Department to demand justice for George Floyd.

=== Conway ===
On May 31, protesters in Conway marched from downtown Conway towards the Faulkner County Courthouse. The protests eventually spilled onto Interstate 40 at the exit on Oak Street. Authorities made arrests and used tear gas to remove protesters from the interstate. Protesters largely remained on Oak Street close to the interstate for the remainder of the night.

=== El Dorado ===
On May 30, a small number of people demonstrated at Old City Park against police brutality. The following day, around 100 protesters gathered at City Hall. On June 1, another demonstration of about 50 protesters took place at Old City Park. All events were peaceful.

=== Fayetteville ===
Dozens of protesters demonstrated peacefully at the corner of College Avenue and Lafayette Street from 1 to 6 p.m. on May 30. Around 4,000 people attended a peaceful protest at the Fayetteville Square on June 2.

=== Fort Smith ===
Hundreds of protesters were on Rogers Avenue and Garrison Avenue on May 31, 2020.

=== Harrison ===
On June 4, around 300 people attended a protest in Harrison, a town in Arkansas noted for its history of race riots and organized white supremacy. Around 15 people with armed assault rifles and displaying Confederate flags looked on nearby. In July a lone protester, Rob Bliss, held a Black Lives Matter sign in front of a White Pride billboard. A video Bliss took shows several drivers yelling at Bliss, and eventually the manager of a Walmart made Bliss leave.

=== Jonesboro ===
On May 31 and June 1, hundreds of protesters demonstrated in Jonesboro, shutting down roads. One man was arrested after pointing a gun a protesters.

=== Little Rock ===
On May 30 about 400 to 500 people took part in a protest on the steps of the Arkansas State Capitol. During the evening, protesters clashed with police as protesters shot fireworks at police, police fired tear gas at protesters, some windows were broken in businesses across the street, and Interstate 630 was briefly blocked on two occasions. A new mural was also added on West 7th Street.

On June 14, four Walmarts and a Sam's Club closed for a day after protesters demonstrated outside store entrances, with one group forming a human chain in front of the Walmart on Cantrell road. Police did not coordinate the closings with Walmart, and there were no arrests or reports of damage associated with the protests.

On June 17, Mayor Frank Scott announced that the Little Rock Police Department had banned its police force from using "vascular neck restraints", saying "We have been listening to the protesters."

=== Pine Bluff ===
On June 4, a "drive-in rally" took place at the Pine Bluff Civic Center, where 300 people turned up but remained in their cars to avoid spreading the coronavirus. A group of speakers implored attendees to involve themselves in the political process in order to make change happen.

=== Rogers ===
On June 5, a crowd of protesters demonstrated outside City Hall to support Black Lives Matter. On June 10, another group of protesters marched to City Hall chanting slogans such as "I can't breathe" and "No justice, no peace". In both protests, demonstrators took a knee for eight minutes and forty-six seconds to honor George Floyd.

=== Russellville ===
On May 31, nearly 200 protesters gathered outside Pope County Courthouse and peacefully demonstrated in support of Black Lives Matter and George Floyd.

=== Texarkana ===
On Saturday afternoon, May 30, 70 to 100 protesters gathered peacefully at the State Line Post Office to listen to speeches, then marched to downtown before returning northward to a parking lot at State Line and Arkansas Boulevard, where the crowd grew and passing motorists honked in support. (Note: this entry is also listed in George Floyd protests in Texas.)
