= KNWA (AM) =

- Bellefonte, Arkansas; United States
- Broadcast area: Harrison, Arkansas
- Frequency: 1600 kHz
- Branding: Boone County Country

Programming
- Format: Classic country

Ownership
- Owner: Harrison Radio Stations, Inc.
- Sister stations: KCWD

History
- First air date: 1986
- Call sign meaning: Northwest Arkansas

Technical information
- Licensing authority: FCC
- Facility ID: 26241
- Class: D
- Power: 1,000 watts (day); 50 watts (night)
- Transmitter coordinates: 36°14′49″N 93°5′6″W
- Translator: 97.5 K248DA (Harrison)

Links
- Public license information: Public file; LMS
- Website: www.knwaradio.com

KNWA (1600 AM) is a radio station licensed to serve Bellefonte, Arkansas, United States. The station, established in 1986, is owned by Harrison Radio Stations, Inc.

== Programming ==
KNWA broadcasts a classic country music format.

== History ==
This station received its original construction permit for a new 500 watt AM station broadcasting at 1600 kHz from the Federal Communications Commission (FCC) on July 23, 1985. The new station was assigned the call letters KNWA by the FCC on August 29, 1985.

KNWA received its license to cover from the FCC on August 11, 1986.
