= KNWA =

KNWA may refer to:

- KNWA-TV, a television station (channel 33, virtual 51) licensed to Rogers, Arkansas, United States
- KNWA (AM), a radio station (1600 AM) licensed to Bellefonte, Arkansas, United States
