= Harrison Courthouse Square Historic District =

Historic district in Arkansas, United States

- U.S. National Register of Historic Places
- U.S. Historic district
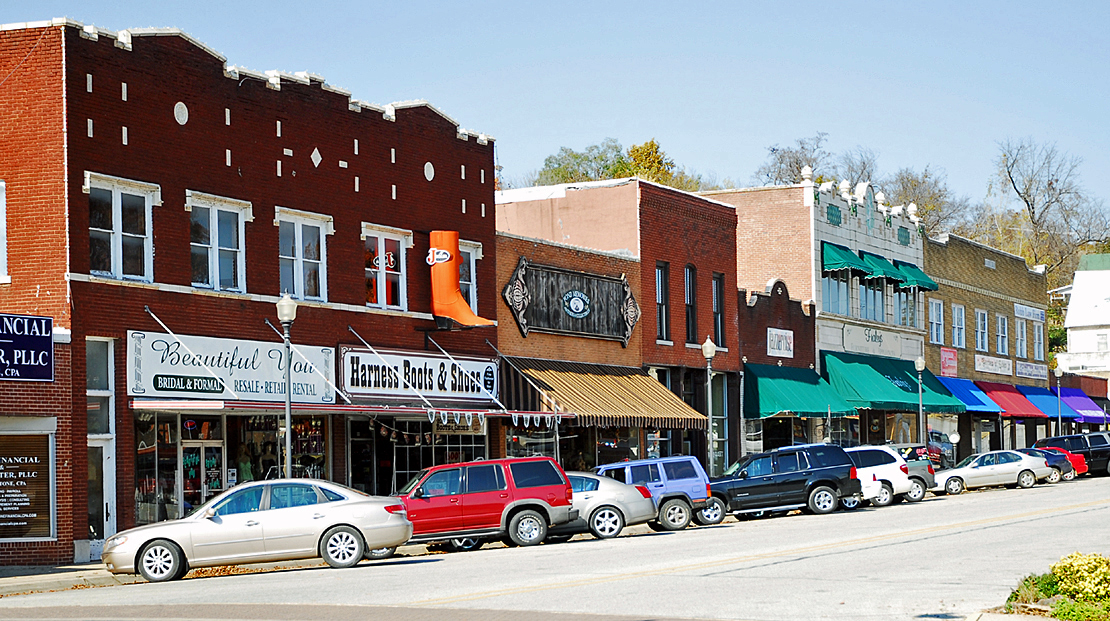
- Buildings in the district

- Location within Arkansas Location within the United States
- Nearest city: Harrison, Arkansas
- Coordinates: 36°13′51″N 93°6′28″W
- Area: 15.5 acres (6.3 ha)
- Built: 1905
- Architect: Charles L. Thompson; Eugene Johnson
- Architectural style: Early Commercial, Late 19th and 20th Century Revivals
- NRHP reference No.: 99000523
- Added to NRHP: May 6, 1999

The Harrison Courthouse Square Historic District is an area of Harrison, Arkansas. It is known by residents simply as "the Square". The Harrison Courthouse Square Historic District includes the 1911 Boone County Courthouse, two pharmacies, several clothing stores and restaurants, and a Marine Corps Legacy Museum. The District also has a bank and the Lyric Theater. The District is the site of several annual festivals, including Crawdad Days and the Fall Festival. Several war memorials stand on the Courthouse lawn. The Square is known as the site of the shooting of famous outlaw Henry Starr.

Most of the square's buildings were built between 1895 and 1948, earlier buildings having been predominantly wooden in construction. The district that was listed on the National Register of Historic Places in 1999 has 54 historically significant buildings, including most of those facing the 1911 courthouse, and a few on the immediately adjacent city blocks.

== See also ==
- National Register of Historic Places listings in Boone County, Arkansas
