= Hotel Seville =

- U.S. National Register of Historic Places
- U.S. Historic district – Contributing property
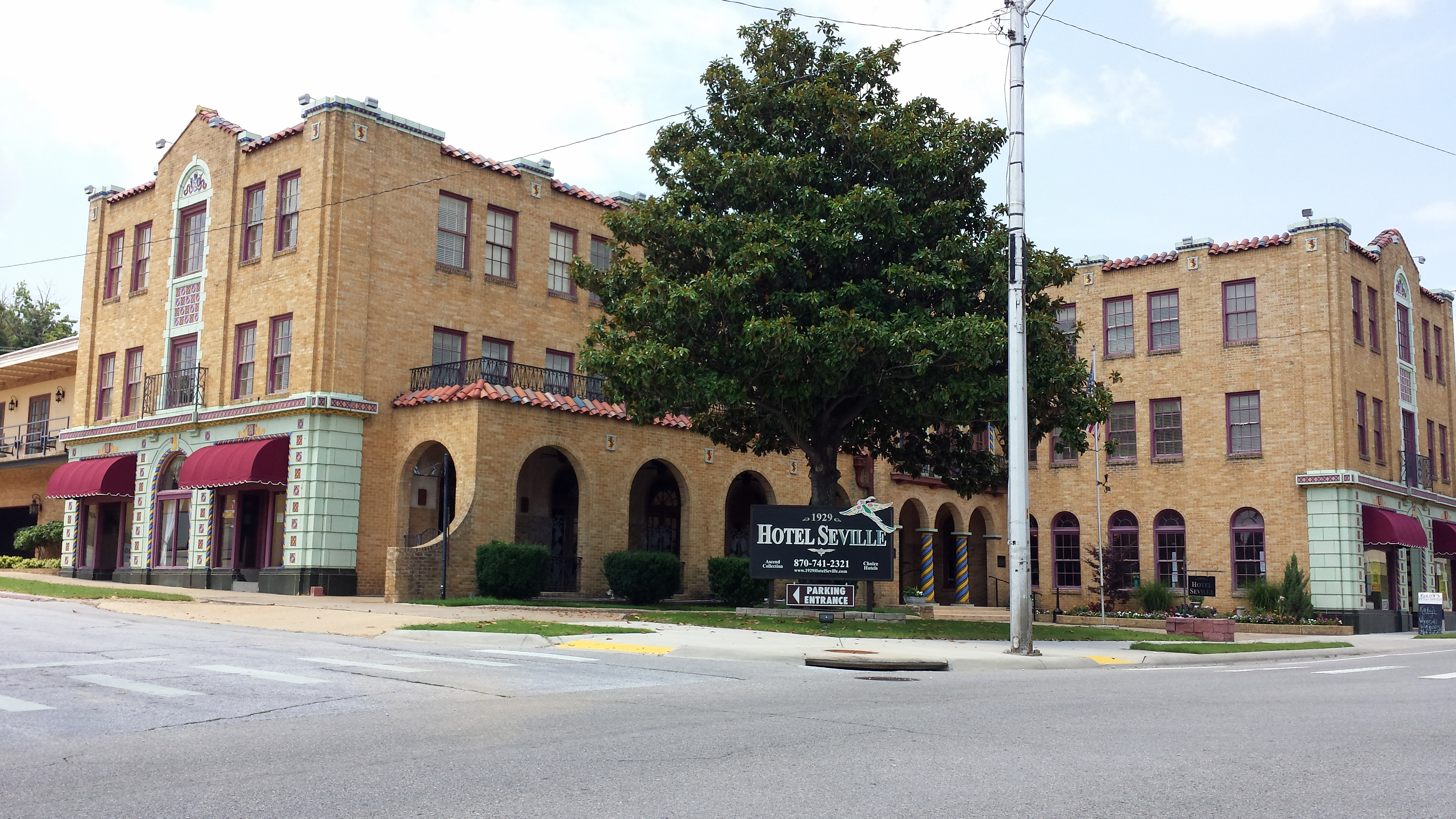

- Location within Arkansas Location within the United States
- Location: NW corner of Vine and Ridge Sts., Harrison, Arkansas
- Coordinates: 36°13′56″N 93°6′27″W
- Area: less than one acre
- Built: 1929
- Built by: Eugene Johnson, Will W. Johnson
- Architectural style: Mission/Spanish Revival
- Website: www.1929hotelseville.com
- Part of: Harrison Courthouse Square Historic District (ID99000523)
- NRHP reference No.: 94000443

Significant dates
- Added to NRHP: May 19, 1994
- Designated CP: May 6, 1999

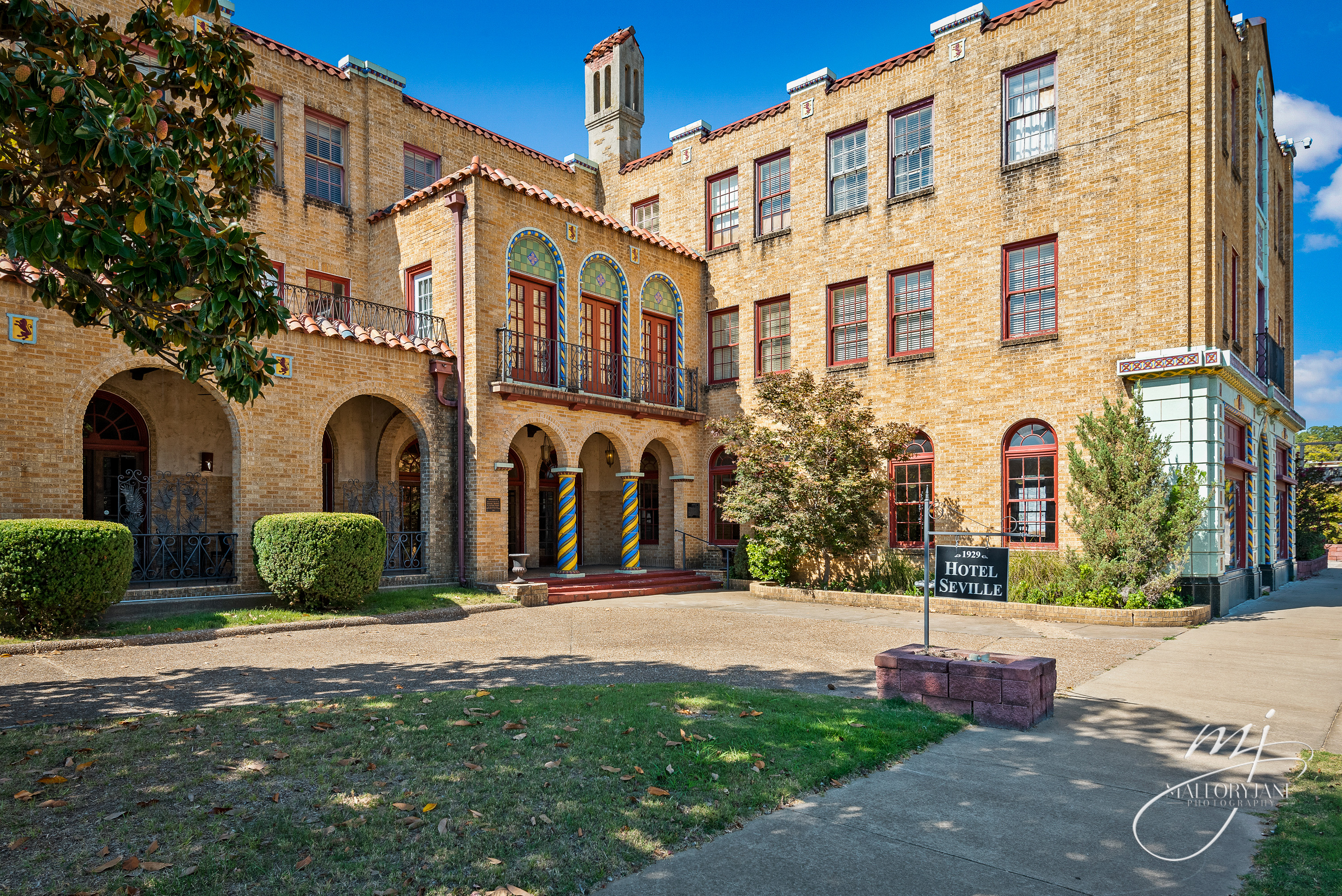

The Hotel Seville is a historic hotel building at Vine and Ridge Streets in downtown Harrison, Arkansas. It is an L-shaped three story wood-frame structure, finished in brick and terra cotta veneer with distinctive Spanish Revival (Mission) styling. Its eastern entry porch is supported by polychrome terra cotta pillars, and portions of the exterior are finished in terra cotta tile with inset geometric patterns. Built in 1929, the building is one of the most elaborate examples of Spanish Revival architecture in the state. It was used as a hotel until the mid-1970s, when it was converted to elderly housing. It has since been converted back to a hotel.

The building was listed on the National Register of Historic Places in 1994.

== See also ==
- National Register of Historic Places listings in Boone County, Arkansas
