= 10 Hours of Walking in NYC as a Woman =

- Screenshot from the video
- Directed by: Rob Bliss
- Starring: Shoshana Roberts
- Distributed by: Hollaback!
- Release date: October 27, 2014
- Running time: 1:54
- Country: United States
- Language: English

10 Hours of Walking in NYC as a Woman is an October 2014 video created for Hollaback! by Rob Bliss Creative featuring 24-year-old actress Shoshana Roberts. The video shows Roberts walking through various neighborhoods of New York City, wearing jeans, a black crewneck T-shirt, with a hidden camera recording her from the front. The two-minute video includes selected footage from ten hours, showcasing what has been described as "catcalls" and street harassment of Roberts by men, reporting there were 108 such instances. The behaviors included people saying "hello" or "good morning", comments on Roberts' appearance, attempts to initiate conversation, angry remarks, and men following her for several minutes. As of November 2025, the video has received over 52 million views on YouTube.

== Production and goals ==
Roberts said she got involved with the video by responding to a Craigslist post by Rob Bliss a few months prior, and that although Bliss told her that this was potentially a viral video, she was skeptical but was open to giving it a try. Bliss himself shot the video by walking a few feet in front of Roberts with a GoPro camera in his backpack. Bliss and Emily May (executive director and co-founder of Hollaback!, for whom the video was made) clarified in comments to The Washington Post that Roberts' dress choice (jeans and a T-shirt) was made so as to debunk the misconception that women only get harassed if they wear revealing clothing. Roberts also said that she experienced similar harassment every day on the streets of New York City as was shown in the video.

== Reception ==
The video was hailed for providing visual proof of what many considered an important problem relating to the treatment of women in city streets.

Several commentators disputed the implicit characterization of many incidents in the video, such as people casually greeting Roberts, as harassment. Others responded that, even though the words themselves may not seem like harassment, the social context, including that they were directed only at Roberts rather than at male passersby, made them harassment.

Another criticism was that the video was racially biased because it depicted black men harassing Roberts, who is Jewish, even though the video creator said that she was catcalled by people of all races. Hollaback! responded to the criticism by noting that this video was only the first in a series of many videos that would document different forms of street harassment, and said it regretted any racial bias in the video. An analysis of the video documented that most of the scenes shown in the video were taken in neighborhoods with predominantly black and Hispanic populations, raising the question of whether the video was shot mostly in these locations, or whether harassment was more prevalent in these locations than in others.

The video was discussed on CNN by Amanda Seales and Steve Santagati in a segment hosted by Fredricka Whitfield, with Seales saying that men catcalling women is not complimentary and that women do not like being catcalled, while Santagati went on to defend men catcalling women, saying that women should take catcalling as a compliment and not abuse.

Some critics combined both angles of criticism, claiming that the comments that Roberts considered street harassment were so perceived by her (and by her audience) because of race and class differences between her and the men making the comments. Others disputed the characterization of the video as racist.

Roberts, the woman featured in the video, reported receiving death threats within days of the video being released, and said that she no longer felt safe. Roberts later filed a lawsuit against the video's producers. However, the lawsuit was dismissed before going to trial.

In 2015, Roberts was named as one of The Forward 50.

== Response videos ==
- A spoof Funny or Die video showed a man walking around for ten hours in NYC and getting harassed.
- Josh Apter and Gary Mahmoud of the YouTube channel Cringe Factory created a spoof of 10 Hours of Princess Leia Walking in NYC.
- Comedian Scott Rogowsky also made a spoof video showing 10 hours of walking through NYC as a Jew.
- A man dressed as a hipster also made a spoof video, walking through the streets of Austin, Texas.
- A male model walked around New York City for three hours, recorded via hidden camera by Model Pranksters, was shown to have received over 30 catcalls, many of them qualitatively similar to what Roberts received. The video was taken as evidence that an attractive man in a body-flattering outfit could get harassed in much the same way that many women did, but commentators noted that whereas harassment was a reality for almost all women, only extremely good-looking men had to deal with it.
- A video was shot in Auckland, New Zealand, with a very similar setup to the original video, featuring model Nicola Simpson. The video reported no catcalling instances, and noted that she was stopped only twice, once by somebody asking for directions and another time by somebody who complimented her on her appearance but followed up by apologizing for stopping her. The video was cited as evidence that harassment is not an inevitable reality of life but rather dependent on the culture in a region, and that it was possible for big cities to have substantially lower levels of harassment.
- A woman walking around New York City, initially dressed in ordinary Western clothing (for five hours) and then in a hijab (for another five hours). Although she got harassed in a manner similar to Roberts in the first five hours, she didn't get harassed in the next five hours. The video was created by Karim Metwaly and the woman in the video was a friend of his. The implied message in favor of wearing the hijab was critiqued by commentators, who argued that such messages continued the tradition of blaming the victim and requiring women to be the ones to adjust their behavior while being judged by the male gaze, a problem allegedly prevalent both in the West and in the Middle East and other Islamic countries.
- A woman, Pooja Singh, dressed in miniskirt and a tank top was filmed by IndieTube walking through the streets of Mumbai, India. Although a few men looked at her covertly, nobody approached or harassed her. The video ended with the note: "Not even a single incident of woman street harassment took place in a city that has diversified culture, demographics and economy. The female citizens are safe, respected and treated unbiased in this city which never sleeps." Multiple commentators were pleasantly surprised and praised Mumbai residents for their civility and for minding their own business.
- A man dressed in a stereotypically gay manner walked around New York City for 3 hours, recorded by hidden video. The creators identified over 50 instances of street harassment faced by the man. The video was cited as evidence of the existence of openly expressed homophobia in society.

== See also ==
- Holding a Black Lives Matter Sign in America's Most Racist Town
