= Arkansas Highway 266 =

State highway in Arkansas, United States

Highway 266
- AR 266 highlighted in red

Route information
- Maintained by ArDOT
- Length: 0.87 mi (1,400 m)

Major junctions
- West end: US 64 / US 65B
- East end: Siebenmorgen Rd

Location
- Country: United States
- State: Arkansas

Highway system
- Arkansas Highway System; Interstate; US; State; Business; Spurs; Suffixed; Scenic; Heritage
← AR 265	→ AR 267

Arkansas Highway 266 (AR 266 and Hwy. 266) is an east–west state highway in Faulkner County, Arkansas. The route of 0.87 miles (1.40 km) runs from U.S. Route 65 Business and U.S. Route 64 in Conway east to Siebenmorgen Road.

== Route description ==
Located entirely in Faulkner County, its west terminus was at an intersection with U.S. Route 65 Business and U.S. Route 64 in Conway at a roundabout near the entrance to Hendrix College. The route then proceeds east before ending at the Arkansas Human Development Center and continuing on as Siebenmorgen Road.

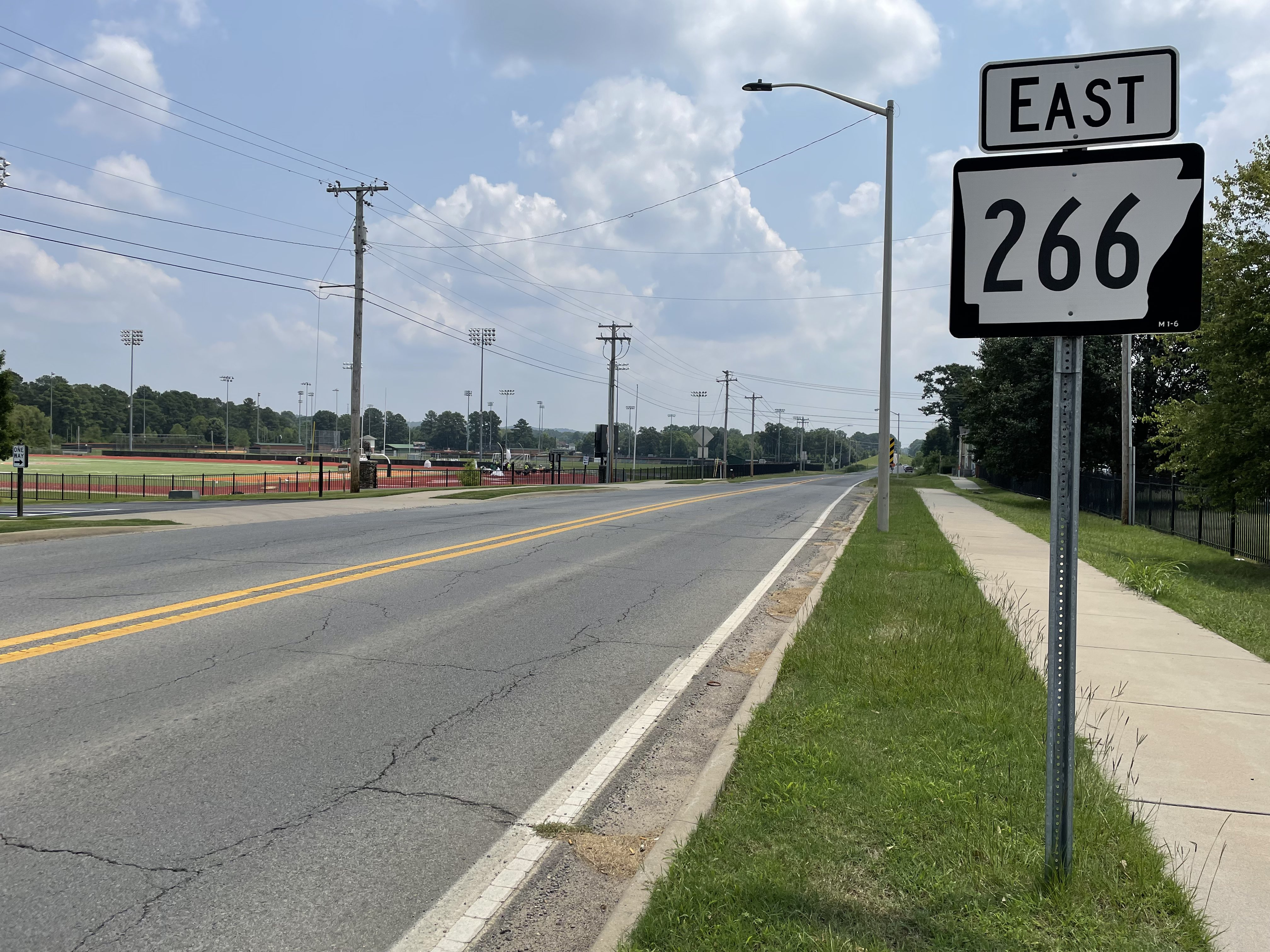
State Highway 266 at its western terminus in Conway, Arkansas

== Major intersections ==
The entire route is in Conway, Faulkner County.

mi	km	Destinations	Notes
0.00	0.00	US 64 / US 65B (Harkrider Street)	Western terminus
0.87	1.40	Siebenmorgen Road	Eastern terminus
1.000 mi = 1.609 km; 1.000 km = 0.621 mi
