= KHBZ (FM) =

- Harrison, Arkansas; United States
- Broadcast area: Branson metropolitan area
- Frequency: 102.9 MHz
- Branding: New Country 102.9

Programming
- Language: English
- Format: Country music

Ownership
- Owner: Mike Huckabee; (Ozark Mountain Media Group, LLC)
- Sister stations: KHOZ

History
- First air date: 1963
- Former call signs: KHOZ-FM (1979–1989); KWNQ (1989–1990); KHOZ-FM (1990–2012)
- Call sign meaning: Buzz

Technical information
- Licensing authority: FCC
- Facility ID: 26235
- Class: C1
- ERP: 100,000 watts
- HAAT: 299 meters (981 ft)
- Transmitter coordinates: 36°26′10.4″N 93°14′43.7″W

Links
- Public license information: Public file; LMS
- Webcast: Listen live
- Website: www.newcountry1029.com

KHBZ (102.9 FM, New Country 102.9) is a radio station broadcasting a country music format. Licensed to Harrison, Arkansas, United States, the station is currently owned by Paul Coates and Mike Huckabee, through licensee Ozark Mountain Media Group, LLC.

== History ==
The station launched on March 29, 1963, under the call sign KHOZ-FM. Throughout much of the 1970s and 1980s, the station ran an adult contemporary music format. In 1989, the station upgraded its format to contemporary hit radio under the call sign KWNQ and branding "WINK FM". Unfortunately, it was short-lived, and in Spring 1990, the station dropped CHR and flipped to its current country format, which also brought back its KHOZ-FM call letters.

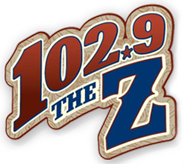
Former logo
