= Marine Corps Legacy Museum =

Coordinates: 36°13′52″N 93°06′30″W

- Established: November 10, 2001
- Location: Town Square; Harrison, Arkansas; United States
- Type: Military History
- Director: D. A. Millis
- Curator: D. A. Millis II
- Website: Marine Corps Legacy Museum

The Marine Corps Legacy Museum was located on the northwest corner of the Town Square in Harrison, Arkansas, United States. It closed in 2010.

== Information ==
The museum contained exhibits and artifacts relating to the heritage and history of the U. S. Marine Corps. In 2003, the museum won the prestigious Colonel John H. Magruder III Award from the Marine Corps Heritage Foundation.

== See also ==
- Marine Corps Museums
- United States Marine Corps
