= Boone County Courthouse (Arkansas) =

- U.S. National Register of Historic Places
- U.S. Historic district – Contributing property
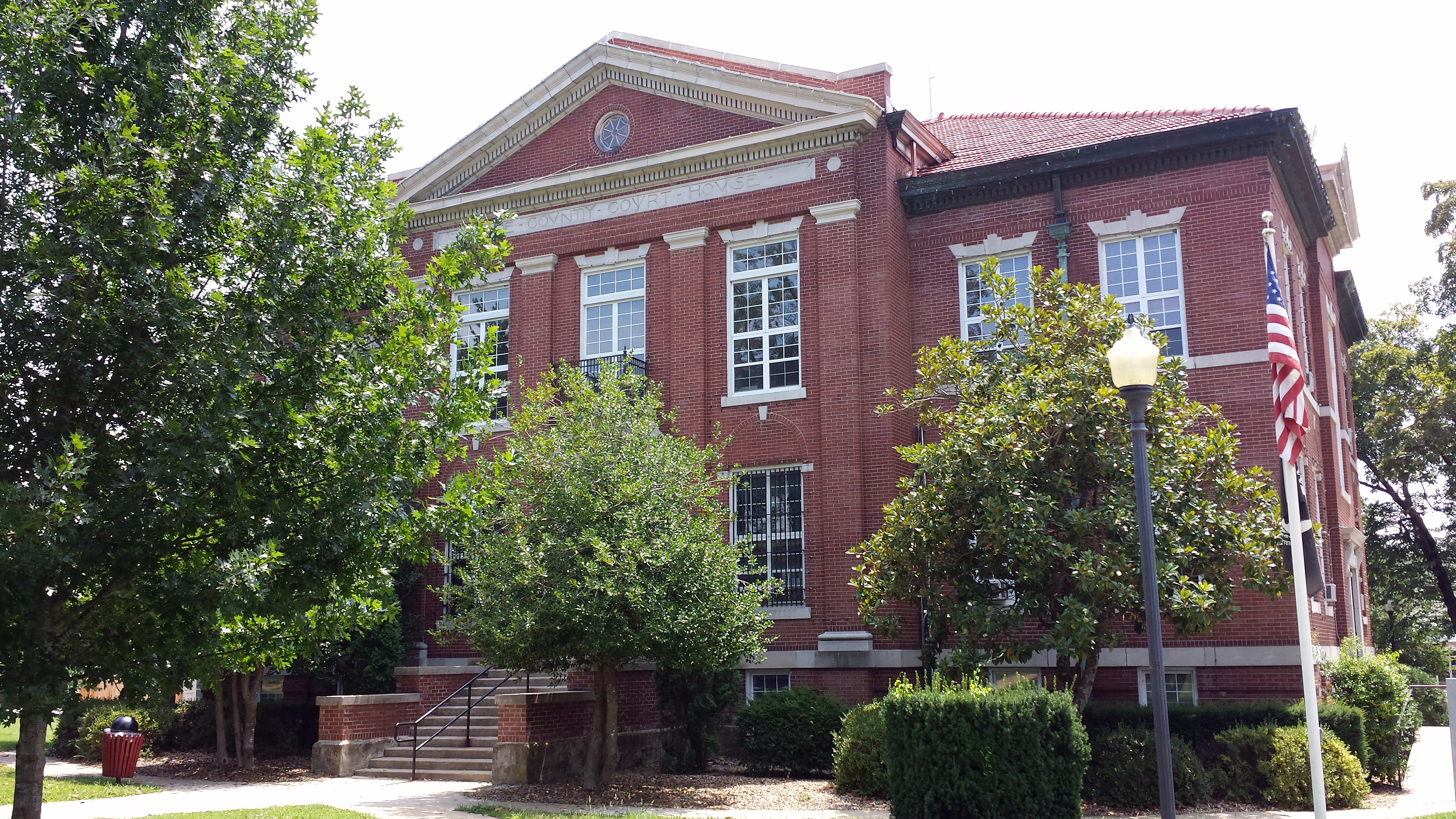

- Location within Arkansas Location within the United States
- Location: 100 N. Main St., Harrison, Arkansas
- Coordinates: 36°13′49″N 93°6′29″W
- Area: less than one acre
- Built: 1909
- Architect: Charles L. Thompson
- Architectural style: Colonial Revival, Georgian Revival
- Part of: Harrison Courthouse Square Historic District (ID99000523)
- NRHP reference No.: 76000387

Significant dates
- Added to NRHP: July 21, 1976
- Designated CP: May 6, 1999

The Boone County Courthouse is a historic courthouse in Harrison, Arkansas. It is a two-story brick structure, designed by noted Arkansas architect Charles L. Thompson and built in 1907. It is Georgian Revival in style, with a hip roof above a course of dentil molding, and bands of cast stone that mark the floor levels of the building. It has a projecting gabled entry section, three bays wide, with brick pilasters separating the center entrance from the flanking windows. The gable end has a dentillated pediment, and has a bullseye window at the center.

The building was listed on the National Register of Historic Places in 1976.

== See also ==
- Boone County Jail, also designed by Thompson and NRHP-listed in Harrison
- National Register of Historic Places listings in Boone County, Arkansas
