= KHOZ =

- Harrison, Arkansas; United States
- Frequency: 900 kHz
- Branding: 94.9 KHOZ

Programming
- Format: Classic country

Ownership
- Owner: Paul Coates and Mike Huckabee; (Ozark Mountain Media Group, LLC)
- Sister stations: KHBZ

History
- First air date: September 28, 1946

Technical information
- Licensing authority: FCC
- Facility ID: 26234
- Class: D
- Power: 1,000 watts day 62 watts night
- Transmitter coordinates: 36°14′35.5″N 93°06′43.5″W
- Translator: 94.9 K235CE (Harrison)

Links
- Public license information: Public file; LMS
- Webcast: Listen Live
- Website: harrisonsoriginalkhoz.com

KHOZ (900 AM) is a radio station licensed to Harrison, Arkansas, United States. It carries a classic country format. The station is currently owned by Paul Coates and Mike Huckabee, through licensee Ozark Mountain Media Group, LLC.

On January 6, 2019, KHOZ changed their format from adult standards to classic country, branded as "Bootz 94.9" (simulcast on FM translator K235CE 94.9 FM Harrison).

== Previous logos ==
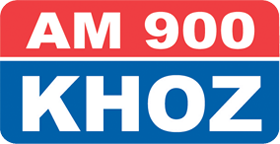
