= A Debtor to the Law =

1919 film

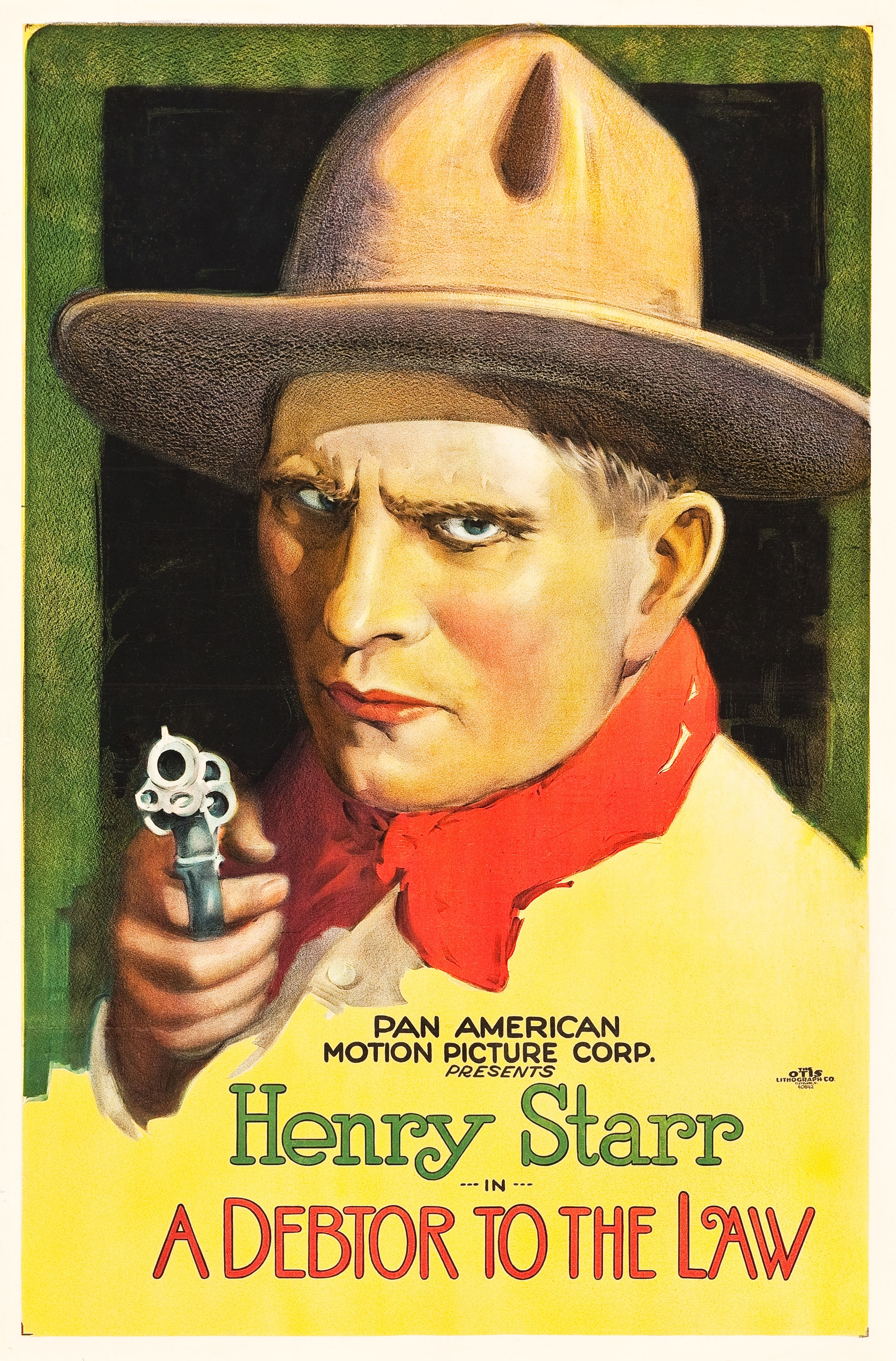
- Theatrical release poster
- Starring: Henry Starr
- Production company: Pan American Motion Picture Corporation
- Distributed by: Norman Distributing Company
- Release date: 1919
- Country: United States
- Languages: Silent; English intertitles

A Debtor to the Law is a lost 1919 American silent Western film starring Henry Starr, a convicted bank robber, as himself. The film is about Starr's attempts to rob two banks in Stroud, Oklahoma, in 1915.

== Preservation ==
With no holdings located in archives, A Debtor to the Law is considered a lost film.
