= Boone County Jail (Arkansas) =

- U.S. National Register of Historic Places
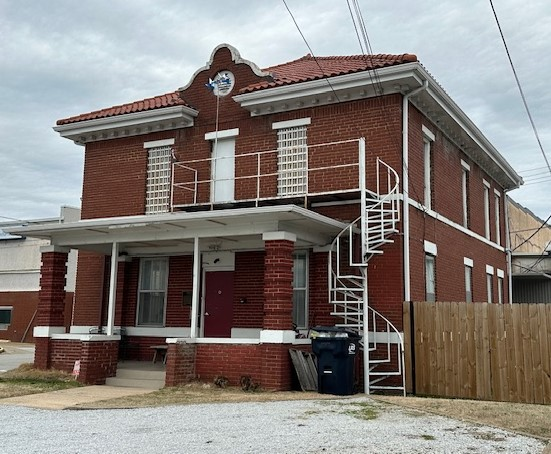
- Boone County Jail, February 2025

- Location within Arkansas Location within the United States
- Location: Central Ave. and Willow St., Harrison, Arkansas
- Coordinates: 36°13′45″N 93°6′30″W
- Area: less than one acre
- Built: 1914
- Architect: Charles L. Thompson
- NRHP reference No.: 76000388
- Added to NRHP: December 12, 1976

The Boone County Jail is a historic jail building at Central Ave. and Willow St. in Harrison, Arkansas. It is a two-story red brick building, built in 1914. Its design has been attributed to prominent Arkansas architect Charles L. Thompson. Its hip roof is finished in red tile, as is the roof of the single-story porch sheltering the main entrance. The jail was laid out to house the jailer on the first floor, and the prisoners on the second.

It was listed on the National Register of Historic Places in 1976 for its architecture.

== See also ==
- Boone County Courthouse (Arkansas), also designed by Thompson and NRHP-listed in Harrison
- National Register of Historic Places listings in Boone County, Arkansas
