= Holding a Black Lives Matter Sign in America's Most Racist Town =

2020 YouTube video by Rob Bliss

Coordinates: 36.211974°N 93.0752647°W

- The video's opening still depicting Rob Bliss standing beneath a white pride billboard showcasing the titular sign
- Directed by: Rob Bliss
- Written by: Rob Bliss
- Produced by: Rob Bliss
- Starring: Rob Bliss
- Edited by: Rob Bliss; John Stessel
- Release date: 27 July 2020 (YouTube)
- Running time: 2 minutes, 18 seconds

"Holding a Black Lives Matter Sign in America's Most Racist Town" is a YouTube video by American filmmaker Rob Bliss, published on July 27, 2020. The video shows Bliss holding a sign reading "Black Lives Matter" in Harrison, Arkansas, a town that has been dubbed "America's Most Racist Town" for its connections to white pride riots and the nearby headquarters of the white supremacist terrorist hate group the Ku Klux Klan. During the video, white passersby drive by and shout racist obscenities.

"Holding a Black Lives Matter Sign in America's Most Racist Town" was filmed from July 9–11 in Harrison using a GoPro. The video was released during protests in the wake of the murder of George Floyd at the hands of Minneapolis police officer Derek Chauvin.

The video drew national media coverage. It drew criticism from Harrison officials, including Mayor Jerry Jackson.

== Background ==
Harrison, Arkansas, the titular "America's Most Racist Town", has a notorious reputation for racism. This is due to various reasons, including multiple race riots in the 20th century as well as Harrison being near the headquarters for the white supremacist terrorist organization the Ku Klux Klan.

Before Bliss created "Holding a Black Lives Matter Sign in America's Most Racist Town", Bliss made other videos about social issues, including 2014's "10 Hours of Walking in NYC as a Woman", which documents the catcalls aimed at actress Shoshana Roberts as she walks through Manhattan. The video spawned parodies, including a Funny or Die satire that replaces the woman with a man, and another in which the woman is replaced with North Korean Supreme Leader Kim Jong-Un. The video also inspired numerous serious variations, including one where the woman is wearing a hijab.

Bliss told The Washington Post that he decided to make the video because he "felt like many of the protests were "preaching to the choir." These conversations should probably be happening in places where you wouldn't expect them if you really want to take that leap and get people to better understand you're fighting for."

In 2022, Bliss organized a stunt where 100 men were promised to go on a Tinder date with a woman, only to be led to a crowded club populated by the other men. In order to date the woman, the men had to compete in a Hunger Games-esque competition.

== Production ==
"Holding a Black Lives Matter Sign in America's Most Racist Town" was filmed over three days. Bliss strapped a GoPro camera to his chest and cut a hole through his T-shirt to film people interacting with him. Bliss said he spent around eight hours per day holding the sign in Harrison: July 9 at a busy intersection and July 10 and 11 outside a Walmart supercenter. The video features Bliss holding a sign that reads "Black Lives Matter" in various locations, including on various roadsides and in front of a Walmart supercenter. Passersby stop by and make various statements, including "White Lives Matter", "All Lives Matter", "nigger", Anti-Semitic pejoratives, and "Are you a Marxist?" One woman states "Fuck black lives", justifying it by saying "and I have black friends".

A man in a cream-colored Camry drives past Bliss and physically threatens him, stating, "About 10 minutes, I'm gonna be back. You better be fucking gone." One passerby claims that Black Lives Matter is "the biggest hoax there ever was" and another responds that it's "the next thing to ISIS." Near the end of the video, Bliss is kicked out of the aforementioned Walmart supercenter despite citing a recently implemented Walmart policy working to prevent racism in its stores.

At the very end of the video, Bliss receives a note written on a napkin. The note reads: "Ignore the haters [you're] being peaceful what [you're] doing is good just a friendly reminder Don't give up hope".

== Reception ==
"Holding a Black Lives Matter Sign in America's Most Racist Town" has over 12 million views on YouTube as of January 2024.

Near the end of the video, Bliss is kicked out of a Walmart after explaining to the manager ("Mike") that a recently implemented Walmart policy is working to prevent racial discrimination in its stores. In a statement to USA Today, Walmart stated, "As a company committed to racial equity, we stand in solidarity with the Black community, and are appalled some chose to express themselves in such a hurtful way."

=== Harrison officials ===
Kevin Cheri, member of the Harrison Community Task Force on Race Relations, said that the video "unfairly maligned" Harrison, and that they are working to fight racism in their community. Cheri commented, "Is there racism in Harrison? Sure, there's some, but no more – and a lot less – than a lot of other places in the United States."

==== Jerry Jackson ====
Jerry Jackson, the mayor of Harrison, gave a statement on the video in a press release on July 28, 2020, the day after the video's release. Jackson stated: "The video does not represent Boone County nor the City of Harrison. While we cannot excuse the reprehensible behavior and words of individuals recorded in the video, we know for certain that they do not reflect the views of the majority of the good people of our communities. It is obvious there is still work to be done in our area and across the nation. We must constantly strive to do better, and we pledge our continued efforts in that regard".

In an extended press release published on the same day, Jackson stated that he believed that the video was nothing more than a professional "hit job" on Rob Bliss' behalf. Jackson stated that "our opinion became clear: Rob Bliss, and a partner, both from Los Angeles, are professional agitators who saw an opportunity to exploit Harrison. After posting his highly edited videos, he immediately starts a GoFundMe page where he collects thousands of dollars in donations, in addition to the money he is paid by YouTube and other social media for views." The GoFundMe page in question was started to help Bliss amass legal funds to protect "both the video and (Bliss)" from legal action.
