= Lyric Theatre (Harrison, Arkansas) =

Coordinates: 36°13′52″N 93°06′29″W

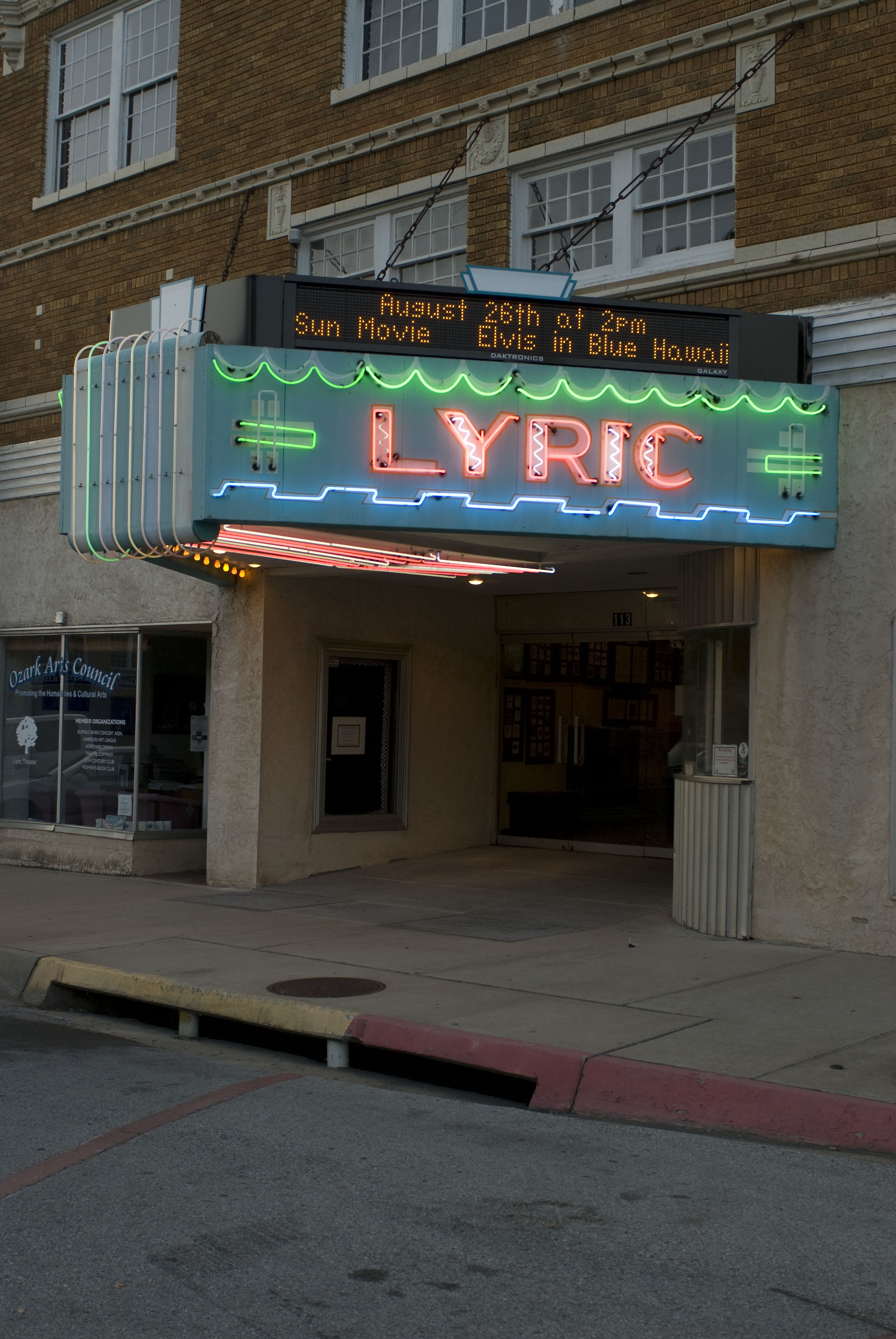
Lyric Theatre, Harrison

The Lyric Theater is a theater located on W. Rush Street in Harrison, Boone County, Arkansas. Designed and constructed by J. W. Bass of Detroit, the Lyric was built in 1929 and adorned with murals by J. W. Zelm (though mythology became prevalent in the area that they had been painted by an unknown hobo). The theater was built as the first cinema in the area to show talking pictures and operated under the same family's ownership until 1977, though as a franchise of different chains.

Following its closure due to an inability to compete with the larger movie theaters, the theater was scheduled for demolition. After more than two decades of disuse, the Lyric reopened as a live performance venue in 1999 when the Ozark Arts Council purchased it for $150,000 and began operating the space. Renovations focused on updating the space for modern use without losing the historic character, including the murals, and these efforts were recognized by the Arkansas Historic Preservation Program. The theater has been lauded as the "Roots Music Palace of the Ozarks."
