= KCWD =

Classic hits radio station in Harrison, Arkansas

- Harrison, Arkansas; United States
- Broadcast area: Branson metropolitan area
- Frequency: 96.1 MHz
- Branding: Kool 96.1

Programming
- Language: English
- Format: Classic hits

Ownership
- Owner: Harrison Radio Stations

History
- First air date: 1982
- Former frequencies: 96.7 MHz (1982–1993)

Technical information
- Licensing authority: FCC
- Facility ID: 26242
- Class: C2
- ERP: 8,000 watts
- HAAT: 363 meters (1,191 ft)
- Transmitter coordinates: 36°6′41″N 93°2′0″W

Links
- Public license information: Public file; LMS
- Webcast: Listen live
- Website: www.kcwdradio.com

KCWD (96.1 FM, "Kool 96.1") is a radio station broadcasting a classic hits format. It is licensed to Harrison, Arkansas, United States. The station is currently owned by Harrison Radio Stations. The station has obtained a construction permit from the FCC for a power increase to 50,000 watts.
