= Henry Starr =

American outlaw and actor (1873–1921)

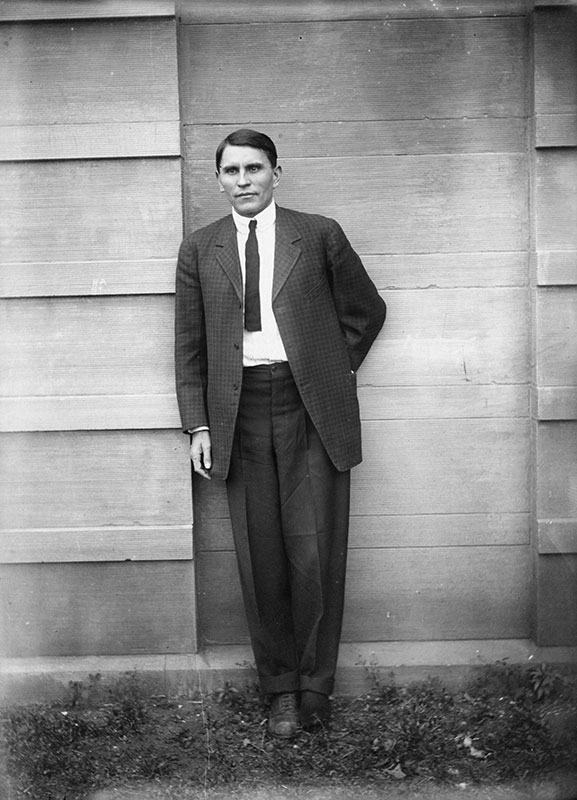
- Picture of Henry Starr from the Oklahoma Historical Society Photograph Collection
- Born: Henry Starr; December 2, 1873; Fort Gibson, Indian Territory, US
- Died: February 22, 1921 (aged 47); Harrison, Arkansas, US
- Cause of death: Gunshot wound
- Burial place: Dewey Cemetery, Dewey, Oklahoma, US
- Occupations: Actor, outlaw

Henry Starr (December 2, 1873 – February 22, 1921) was an American outlaw of the frontier and an actor of the silent film era.

== Biography ==
=== Early life ===
Starr's parents were Mary Scott Starr and George Starr. He was the nephew of Sam Starr, husband of Belle Starr, he was the last in a long line of Starr family criminals.

During Starr's childhood in Indian Territory, he spent his time around gangs in their hideouts. In 1886, Starr's father died. Starr's widowed mother had to watch three children after that. Later on in life, she married a man named C. N. Walker. Starr disliked him, so he left to become a cowboy at a ranch.

=== Criminal activity ===
Starr was first arrested and fined for "Introducing spirits into the territory". Starr was repeatedly arrested for crimes he did not commit. After a while, Starr thought that if he was going to be fined for those crimes, he should just commit a real crime while making a lot of money. That's when he started to rob banks.

Starr was tried for the murder of Deputy U.S. Marshal Floyd Wilson in 1893. Twice sentenced by Judge Isaac C. Parker to hang for murder, following a series of appeals and Starr's confrontation with Cherokee Bill, who was attempting a prison break, his sentence was reduced to a sentence of imprisonment for manslaughter. Starr was eventually granted a presidential pardon and released.

Starr went on to form a notorious gang that terrorized and robbed throughout northwest Arkansas around the start of the 20th century. They were on a crime spree, and the reward if Starr was caught would be $5,000.

=== Later life ===
He was imprisoned again in 1915 in Arizona, wrote his autobiography, Thrilling Events, Life of Henry Starr and, released on parole. In 1919, he joined the Pan American Motion Picture Corporation and starred in a silent film, A Debtor to the Law (1919), playing a dramatized version of himself. While attempting to rob a bank in Harrison, Arkansas, on February 18, 1921, he was shot by the bank president W. J. Myers with a .38 caliber rifle, and later died of his wounds. Starr is buried at Dewey Cemetery in Dewey, Oklahoma.
