= Harrison, Arkansas =

City in Arkansas, United States

- City
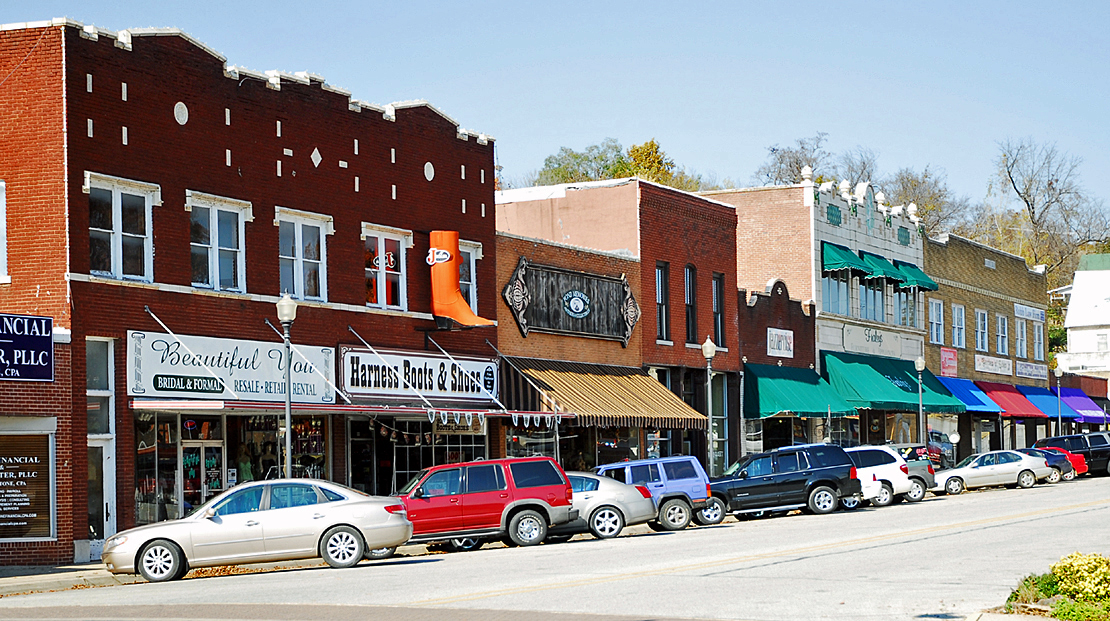
- Historic downtown Harrison (2008)

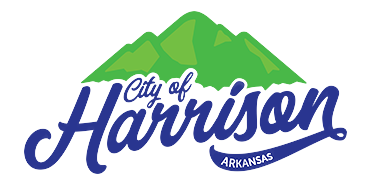
- Flag Logo
- Motto: "Adventure Awaits You"
- Location of Harrison in Boone County, Arkansas.
- Coordinates: 36°14′38″N 93°07′11″W
- Country: United States
- State: Arkansas
- County: Boone
- Platted: 1869
- Incorporated: March 1, 1876

Government
  - Type: Council government
  - Mayor: Jerry Jackson (R)

Area
  - Total: 11.23 sq mi (29.09 km^{2})
  - Land: 11.20 sq mi (29.02 km^{2})
  - Water: 0.027 sq mi (0.07 km^{2})
- Elevation: 1,247 ft (380 m)

Population (2020)
  - Total: 13,069
  - Estimate (2025): 13,802 ▲
  - Density: 1,166.4/sq mi (450.35/km^{2})
- Time zone: UTC−6 (Central (CST))
  - Summer (DST): UTC−5 (CDT)
- ZIP codes: 72601-72602
- Area code: 870
- FIPS code: 05-30460
- GNIS feature ID: 2403805
- Website: www.harrisonar.gov

Harrison is a city in and the county seat of Boone County, Arkansas, United States. It is named after Marcus LaRue Harrison, a surveyor who laid out the city along Crooked Creek at Stifler Springs. As of the 2020 census, Harrison had a population of 13,069. It is the 30th largest city in Arkansas, based on official 2019 estimates from the U.S. Census Bureau. Harrison is the principal city of the Harrison Micropolitan Statistical Area, which includes all of Boone and Newton counties.

The community has a history of racism; there were two race riots in the early 20th century and an influx of white supremacist organizations during the late 20th and early 21st centuries.

== History ==
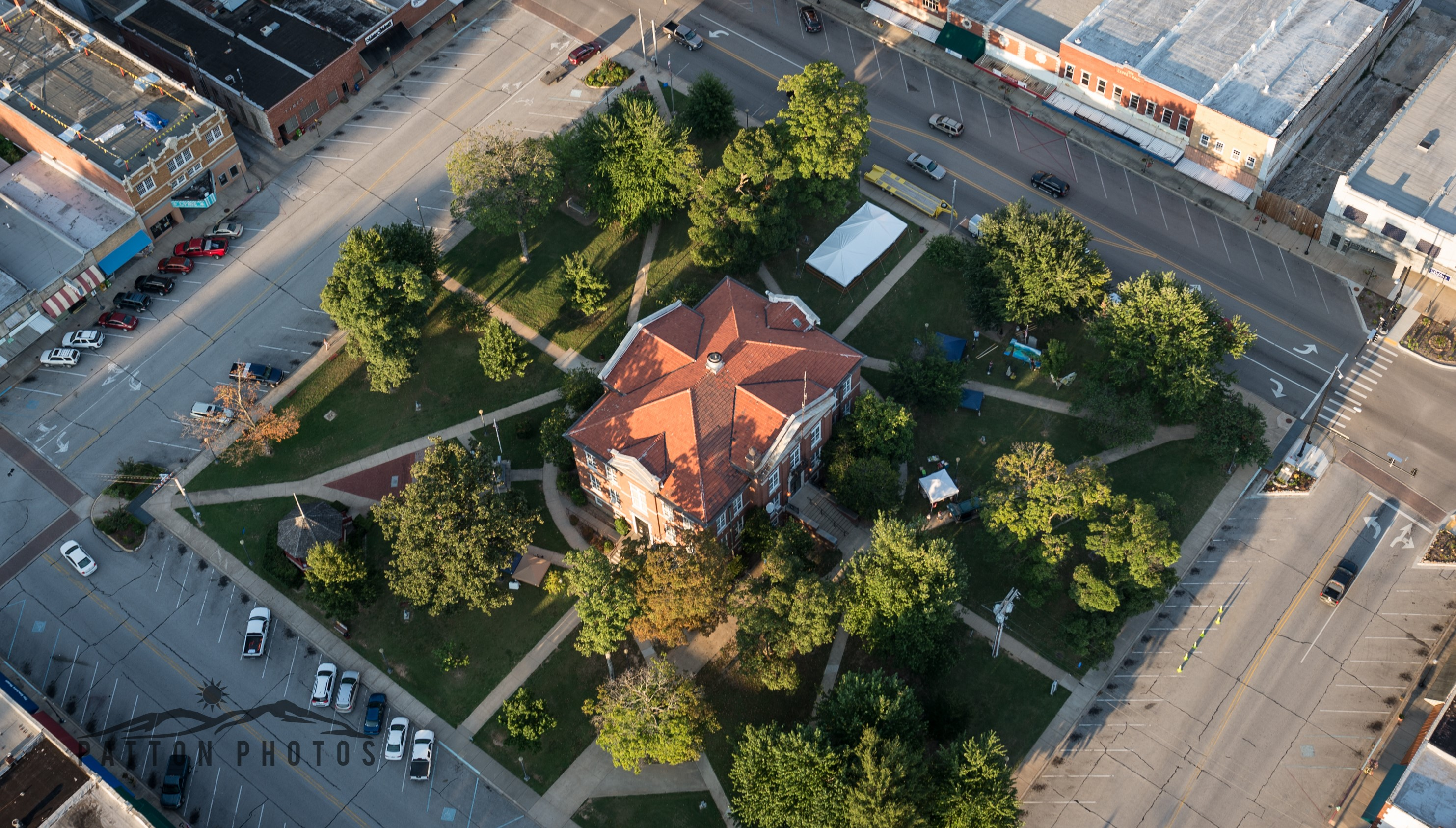
Harrison Courthouse Square, listed in the National Register of Historic Places

=== Precolonial history ===
Native Americans were the earliest inhabitants of the area, probably beginning with cliff dwellers who lived in caves in the bluffs along the rivers. In later times, the Osage, a Siouan speaking people, were the main tribe in the Ozarks, and one of their larger villages is thought to have been to the east of the present site of Harrison. The Shawnee, Quapaw, and Caddo people were also familiar to the area.

The Cherokee arrived around 1816 and did not get along with the Osage. This hostility erupted into a full-scale war in the Ozark Mountains. By the 1830s, both tribes were removed to Indian Territory.

It is possible that the first Europeans to visit the area were some forty followers of Hernando de Soto and that they camped at a Native village on the White River at the mouth of Bear Creek. It is more likely that the discoverers were French hunters or trappers who followed the course of the White River.

=== 19th century ===
In early 1857, the Baker–Fancher wagon train assembled at Beller's Stand, south of Harrison. On September 11, 1857, approximately 120 members of this wagon train were murdered near Mountain Meadows, Utah Territory, by a local Mormon militia and members of the Paiute Indian tribe. In 1955, a monument to memorialize the victims of the massacre was placed on the Harrison town square.

Boone County was organized in 1869, during Reconstruction after the Civil War. Harrison was platted and made the county seat. It is named after Marcus LaRue Harrison, a Union officer who surveyed and platted the town. The town of Harrison was incorporated on March 1, 1876.

=== 20th century ===
==== Harrison race riots of 1905 and 1909 ====
In 1905 and 1909, white race riots occurred in Harrison, which drove away black residents and established the community as one of hundreds of sundown towns in the country.

In 1901, the building of the St. Louis and North Arkansas Railroad through Harrison bolstered the local economy. Economic hardship ensued following the railroad's bankruptcy on July 1, 1905. On October 2, 1905, a white mob breached the Harrison jail, captured two black prisoners, drove the prisoners outside city limits, whipped them, and threatened them to leave the community. The white mob then went to the black community and burned their houses and fired guns at their windows with the message that they should leave the town. At least one person, railroad worker George Richards, was murdered during the event. Local law enforcement declined to take action to press charges for the riot.

On January 18, 1909, Charles Stinnett was arrested and charged with the rape of a white woman named Lovett. Although Stinnett testified that he did not assault the woman and only meant to rob her, a jury sentenced him to hang on February 26, 1909. A mob arrived at the jail to lynch Stinnett after learning that Lovett was very ill, and the mob's presence forced many remaining black residents out of Harrison on January 28, 1909. Stinnett was set to be hanged on March 24, 1909, but his execution was delayed for three hours because he was drunk. On the gallows, Stinnett confessed that he had attempted to rape the woman. He died as a result of strangulation from a failed hanging fifteen minutes, but fall knocked him unconscious and he died "without a struggle".

==== Later 20th century ====
The bank robber and convicted murderer Henry Starr was in Harrison on February 18, 1921, when Starr and three companions entered the People's State Bank and robbed it of $6,000. During the robbery, Starr was shot by the former president of the bank, William J. Myers. Starr was carried to the town jail, where he died the next morning.

On May 7, 1961, heavy rain caused Crooked Creek, immediately south of the downtown business district, to flood the town square and much of the southwestern part of the city. Water levels inside buildings reached 8 feet (2.4 m). Many small buildings and automobiles were swept away. According to the American Red Cross, four people died, 80 percent of the town's business district was destroyed, and over 300 buildings were damaged or destroyed in losses exceeding $5.4 million. In 1962, Sam Walton opened his second Walmart store in Harrison.

In 1982, Kingdom Identity Ministries, an anti-gay Christian Identity outreach ministry identified as a hate group by the Southern Poverty Law Center, was founded in Harrison.

=== 21st century ===
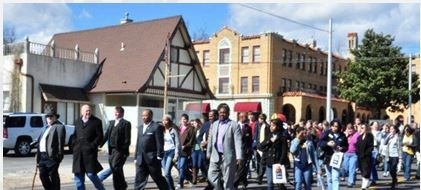
Peace March in Harrison in 2017

Harrison's Community Task Force on Race Relations was established in 2003 to "promote diversity and respond to racial-bias accusations against the city". City officials have made efforts to counteract organized racist activity with educational forums and billboards promoting tolerance. They also attempted to downplay the city's racist reputation and improve its image by editing the town's Wikipedia article.

In 2014, a peace march and vigil celebrating the life and legacy of Martin Luther King Jr. was held in downtown Harrison, hosted by the Arkansas Martin Luther King Jr. Commission. In December of the same year, a dedication was held for a Confederate monument in Harrison.

In 2017, Mayor Dan Sherrell and Boone County Judge Robert Hathaway signed proclamations recognizing June as Confederate Heritage and History Month.

Kevin Cheri, who became the first African-American employed in the area in 1978, received death threats shortly after his arrival, which prompted him to leave the area. He returned in 2007, and in 2019 was recognized by Mayor Jerry Jackson when Harrison issued its first-ever Black History Month proclamation.

In June 2020, a group of around 300 gathered in Harrison to protest police brutality in the murder of George Floyd while 15 people armed with rifles and displaying Confederate and American flags looked on.

As of October 2023, the Southern Poverty Law Center has said that Kingdom Identity Ministries (founded in Harrison) has a location in the city.

== Geography ==
U.S. Routes 62, 65, and 412 pass through Harrison. U.S. 65 leads north 33 miles (53 km) to Branson, Missouri, and south 108 miles (174 km) to Conway, Arkansas. U.S. 62 leads west 43 miles (69 km) to Eureka Springs and beyond to Rogers and Bentonville. U.S. 412 leads west 73 miles (117 km) to Springdale. U.S. 62 and 412 combined lead east 48 miles (77 km) to Mountain Home.

According to the United States Census Bureau, the city has a total area of 11.1 square miles (28.8 km^{2}), of which 11.1 square miles (28.7 km^{2}) is land and 0.04 square miles (0.1 km^{2}), or 0.26%, is water.

=== Climate ===
The climate in this area is characterized by hot, humid summers and generally mild to cool winters. According to the Köppen Climate Classification system, Harrison has a humid subtropical climate, abbreviated "Cfa" on climate maps.

Climate data for Harrison, Arkansas (1991–2020 normals, extremes 1891–present)
Month	Jan	Feb	Mar	Apr	May	Jun	Jul	Aug	Sep	Oct	Nov	Dec	Year
Record high °F (°C)	81 (27)	87 (31)	98 (37)	99 (37)	99 (37)	105 (41)	112 (44)	112 (44)	106 (41)	96 (36)	86 (30)	83 (28)	112 (44)
Mean daily maximum °F (°C)	46.8 (8.2)	51.6 (10.9)	60.0 (15.6)	69.2 (20.7)	76.9 (24.9)	85.0 (29.4)	89.4 (31.9)	89.5 (31.9)	81.8 (27.7)	71.3 (21.8)	59.3 (15.2)	49.1 (9.5)	69.2 (20.7)
Daily mean °F (°C)	37.5 (3.1)	40.8 (4.9)	49.4 (9.7)	58.3 (14.6)	66.9 (19.4)	74.9 (23.8)	78.9 (26.1)	78.3 (25.7)	70.7 (21.5)	59.9 (15.5)	48.5 (9.2)	39.9 (4.4)	58.7 (14.8)
Mean daily minimum °F (°C)	28.1 (−2.2)	30.0 (−1.1)	38.8 (3.8)	47.3 (8.5)	56.8 (13.8)	64.8 (18.2)	68.3 (20.2)	67.0 (19.4)	59.5 (15.3)	48.5 (9.2)	37.7 (3.2)	30.7 (−0.7)	48.1 (8.9)
Record low °F (°C)	−18 (−28)	−20 (−29)	−10 (−23)	20 (−7)	26 (−3)	40 (4)	41 (5)	41 (5)	30 (−1)	16 (−9)	5 (−15)	−6 (−21)	−20 (−29)
Average precipitation inches (mm)	2.96 (75)	2.80 (71)	4.20 (107)	5.17 (131)	5.54 (141)	4.17 (106)	3.74 (95)	3.36 (85)	4.40 (112)	4.02 (102)	3.88 (99)	3.22 (82)	47.46 (1,205)
Average snowfall inches (cm)	2.2 (5.6)	3.4 (8.6)	2.2 (5.6)	0.0 (0.0)	0.0 (0.0)	0.0 (0.0)	0.0 (0.0)	0.0 (0.0)	0.0 (0.0)	0.0 (0.0)	0.2 (0.51)	1.5 (3.8)	9.5 (24)
Average precipitation days (≥ 0.01 in)	7.1	7.2	10.8	10.5	11.2	8.4	9.1	8.8	7.6	8.2	8.0	8.9	105.8
Average snowy days (≥ 0.1 in)	1.5	2.1	1.0	0.1	0.1	0.0	0.0	0.0	0.0	0.0	0.2	1.1	6.1
Source: NOAA

Climate data for Harrison, Arkansas (Boone County Airport) (1991–2020 normals, extremes 1948–present)
Month	Jan	Feb	Mar	Apr	May	Jun	Jul	Aug	Sep	Oct	Nov	Dec	Year
Record high °F (°C)	79 (26)	87 (31)	91 (33)	92 (33)	94 (34)	107 (42)	107 (42)	112 (44)	103 (39)	92 (33)	85 (29)	85 (29)	112 (44)
Mean maximum °F (°C)	69.3 (20.7)	73.0 (22.8)	81.0 (27.2)	84.8 (29.3)	88.2 (31.2)	92.9 (33.8)	96.9 (36.1)	97.5 (36.4)	92.7 (33.7)	85.8 (29.9)	76.4 (24.7)	69.3 (20.7)	98.8 (37.1)
Mean daily maximum °F (°C)	46.9 (8.3)	51.2 (10.7)	60.3 (15.7)	69.6 (20.9)	76.6 (24.8)	84.9 (29.4)	89.1 (31.7)	88.7 (31.5)	81.4 (27.4)	70.8 (21.6)	59.0 (15.0)	49.2 (9.6)	69.0 (20.6)
Daily mean °F (°C)	37.0 (2.8)	40.9 (4.9)	49.2 (9.6)	58.3 (14.6)	66.2 (19.0)	74.4 (23.6)	78.5 (25.8)	77.6 (25.3)	69.9 (21.1)	59.4 (15.2)	48.5 (9.2)	39.7 (4.3)	58.3 (14.6)
Mean daily minimum °F (°C)	27.2 (−2.7)	30.6 (−0.8)	38.1 (3.4)	47.0 (8.3)	55.8 (13.2)	63.9 (17.7)	67.9 (19.9)	66.5 (19.2)	58.5 (14.7)	48.0 (8.9)	38.0 (3.3)	30.2 (−1.0)	47.6 (8.7)
Mean minimum °F (°C)	8.1 (−13.3)	12.2 (−11.0)	19.8 (−6.8)	31.2 (−0.4)	41.4 (5.2)	53.1 (11.7)	58.6 (14.8)	56.5 (13.6)	44.6 (7.0)	31.5 (−0.3)	21.4 (−5.9)	13.3 (−10.4)	4.8 (−15.1)
Record low °F (°C)	−13 (−25)	−9 (−23)	−9 (−23)	22 (−6)	32 (0)	46 (8)	50 (10)	48 (9)	33 (1)	21 (−6)	8 (−13)	−11 (−24)	−13 (−25)
Average precipitation inches (mm)	2.67 (68)	2.42 (61)	3.91 (99)	4.98 (126)	4.81 (122)	3.85 (98)	3.67 (93)	3.42 (87)	4.06 (103)	3.81 (97)	3.96 (101)	2.94 (75)	44.50 (1,130)
Average snowfall inches (cm)	3.1 (7.9)	3.1 (7.9)	2.3 (5.8)	0.3 (0.76)	0.0 (0.0)	0.0 (0.0)	0.0 (0.0)	0.0 (0.0)	0.0 (0.0)	0.1 (0.25)	0.1 (0.25)	0.9 (2.3)	9.9 (25.16)
Average precipitation days (≥ 0.01 in)	8.2	7.7	10.4	9.9	11.8	9.2	9.3	8.1	8.0	9.1	8.4	8.1	108.2
Average snowy days (≥ 0.1 in)	1.9	1.6	1.1	0.1	0.0	0.0	0.0	0.0	0.0	0.0	0.2	0.7	5.6
Source: NOAA

== Demographics ==
=== Racial and ethnic composition ===
Harrison, Arkansas – racial and ethnic composition Note: the US Census treats Hispanic/Latino as an ethnic category. This table excludes Latinos from the racial categories and assigns them to a separate category. Hispanics/Latinos may be of any race.
Race / ethnicity (NH = Non-Hispanic)	Pop 2000	Pop 2010	Pop 2020	% 2000	% 2010	% 2020
White alone (NH)	11,714	12,245	11,501	96.40%	94.61%	88.00%
Black or African American alone (NH)	14	32	53	0.12%	0.25%	0.41%
Native American or Alaska Native alone (NH)	85	82	85	0.70%	0.63%	0.65%
Asian alone (NH)	61	94	148	0.50%	0.73%	1.13%
Native Hawaiian or Pacific Islander alone (NH)	2	5	14	0.02%	0.04%	0.11%
Other race alone (NH)	3	7	39	0.02%	0.05%	0.30%
Mixed-race or multiracial (NH)	87	192	727	0.72%	1.48%	5.56%
Hispanic or Latino (any race)	186	286	502	1.53%	2.21%	3.84%
Total	12,152	12,943	13,069	100.00%	100.00%	100.00%

Historical population
Census	Pop.	Note	%±
1880	582		—
1890	1,438		147.1%
1900	1,551		7.9%
1910	1,602		3.3%
1920	3,477		117.0%
1930	3,626		4.3%
1940	4,238		16.9%
1950	5,542		30.8%
1960	6,580		18.7%
1970	7,239		10.0%
1980	9,567		32.2%
1990	9,922		3.7%
2000	12,152		22.5%
2010	12,943		6.5%
2020	13,069		1.0%
2025 (est.)	13,802	▲	5.6%
U.S. Decennial Census

=== 2020 census ===
As of the 2020 census, Harrison had a population of 13,069. The median age was 40.6 years. 21.8% of residents were under the age of 18 and 21.5% of residents were 65 years of age or older. For every 100 females there were 88.6 males, and for every 100 females age 18 and over there were 84.3 males age 18 and over.

98.6% of residents lived in urban areas, while 1.4% lived in rural areas.

There were 5,731 households and 3,198 families in Harrison, of which 26.2% had children under the age of 18 living in them. Of all households, 39.0% were married-couple households, 20.0% were households with a male householder and no spouse or partner present, and 34.8% were households with a female householder and no spouse or partner present. About 36.9% of all households were made up of individuals and 17.1% had someone living alone who was 65 years of age or older.

There were 6,301 housing units, of which 9.0% were vacant. The homeowner vacancy rate was 2.9% and the rental vacancy rate was 7.3%.

Harrison racial composition
Race	Number	Percentage
White (non-Hispanic)	11,501	88.0%
Black or African American (non-Hispanic)	53	0.41%
Native American	85	0.65%
Asian	148	1.13%
Pacific Islander	14	0.11%
Other/mixed	766	5.86%
Hispanic or Latino	502	3.84%

=== 2010 census ===
As of the census of 2010, there were 12,943 people and 6,043 housing units in the city. The racial makeup of the city was 96.2% White, 0.3% Black or African American, 0.6% American Indian and Alaska Native, 0.7% Asian, 0.0% Pacific Islander, and 1.6% from two or more races. 2.2% of the population were Hispanic or Latino of any race.

23.2% of the population was under the age of 18, and 19.0% were 65 years of age or older. Females made up 53.1% of the population, and males made up 46.9% of the population.

The median income for the period 2007–11 for a household in the city was $33,244, and the number of people living below the poverty level was 15.1%. The median value of owner-occupied housing units was $108,700.

== Economy ==
Harrison is home of the general office of FedEx Freight, a leading Less-Than-Load (LTL) freight carrier. Arkansas Freightways, later renamed to American Freightways, was combined with Viking Freight to become FedEx Freight in February 2001.

=== Major employers ===
- FedEx Freight Inc. (trucking and distribution)
- North Arkansas Regional Medical Center (medical services)
- Walmart Inc. (retail)
- Pace Industries (aluminum die-casting)
- Claridge Products and Equipment, Inc. (markerboards, chalkboards and bulletin boards)
- Windstream (telecommunications)
- Wabash Wood Products (trailer floor manufacturing)
- North Arkansas College (education)
- WestRock, formerly RockTenn Company (folding paperboard cartons)

== Architecture ==
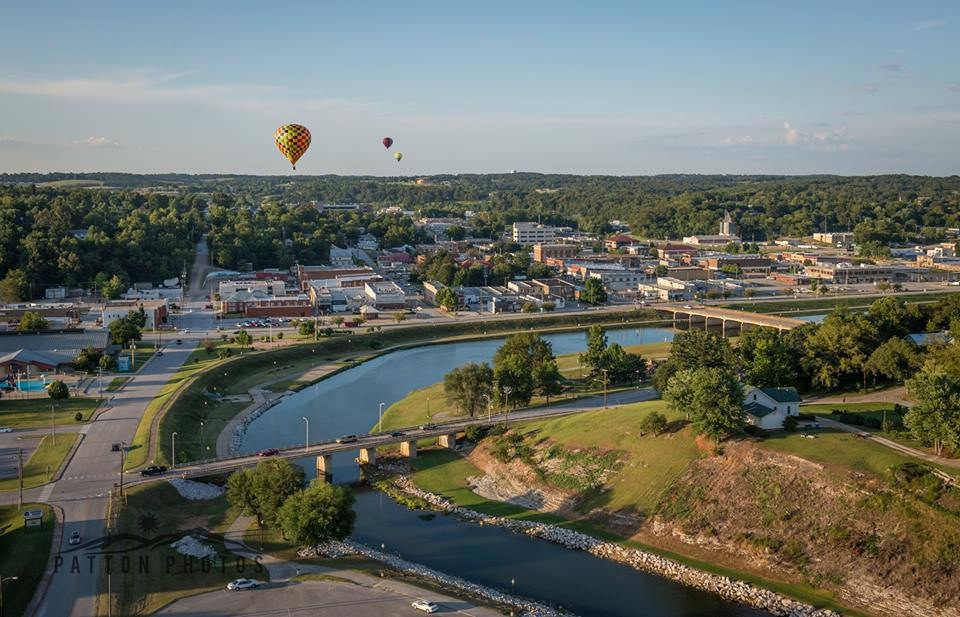
Lake Harrison Park and downtown Harrison viewed from a hot air balloon during the Balloon Festival

The Boone County Courthouse, built in 1909, and the Boone County Jail, built in 1914, were both designed by architect Charles L. Thompson and are listed on the U.S. National Register of Historic Places.

== Arts and culture ==
=== Annual cultural events ===
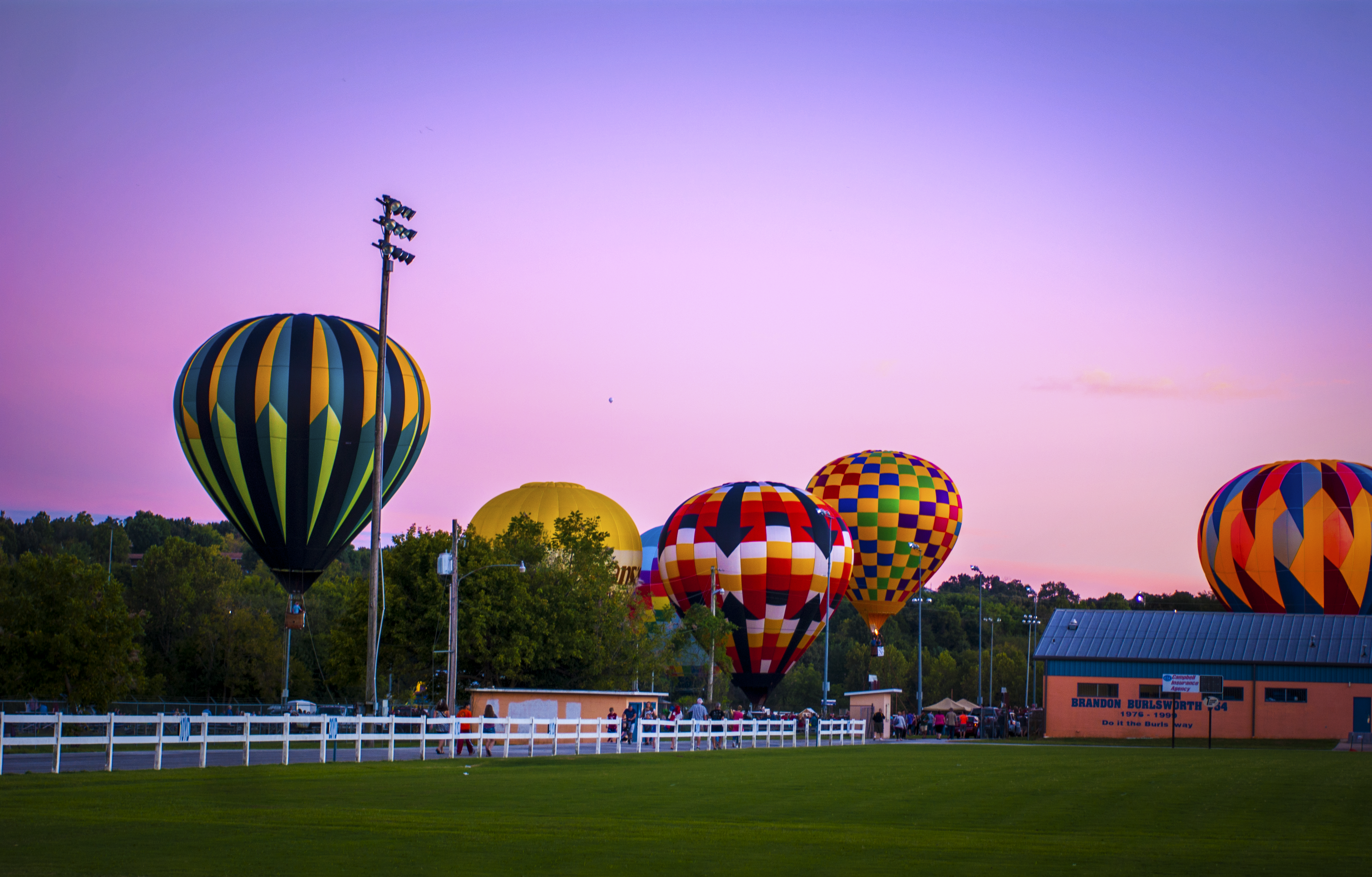
Hot air balloons from across the United States attend this annual two-day event.

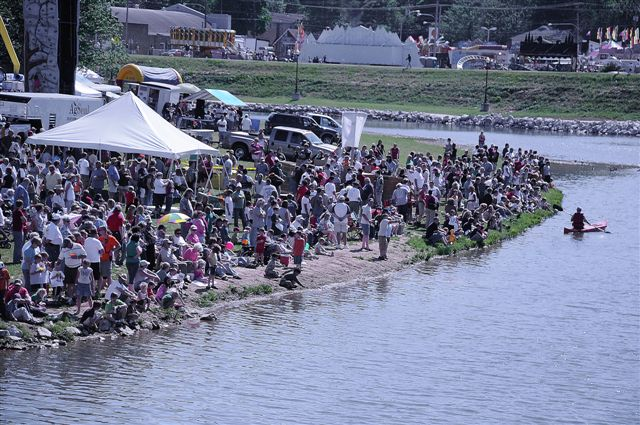
Crawdad Days (2008) at Crooked Creek, an annual festival

Harrison hosts the annual Arkansas Hot Air Balloon races each September, Crawdad Days Music Festival each May, a Harvest Homecoming festival each October, and Christmas celebration in December.

=== Museums and other points of interest ===
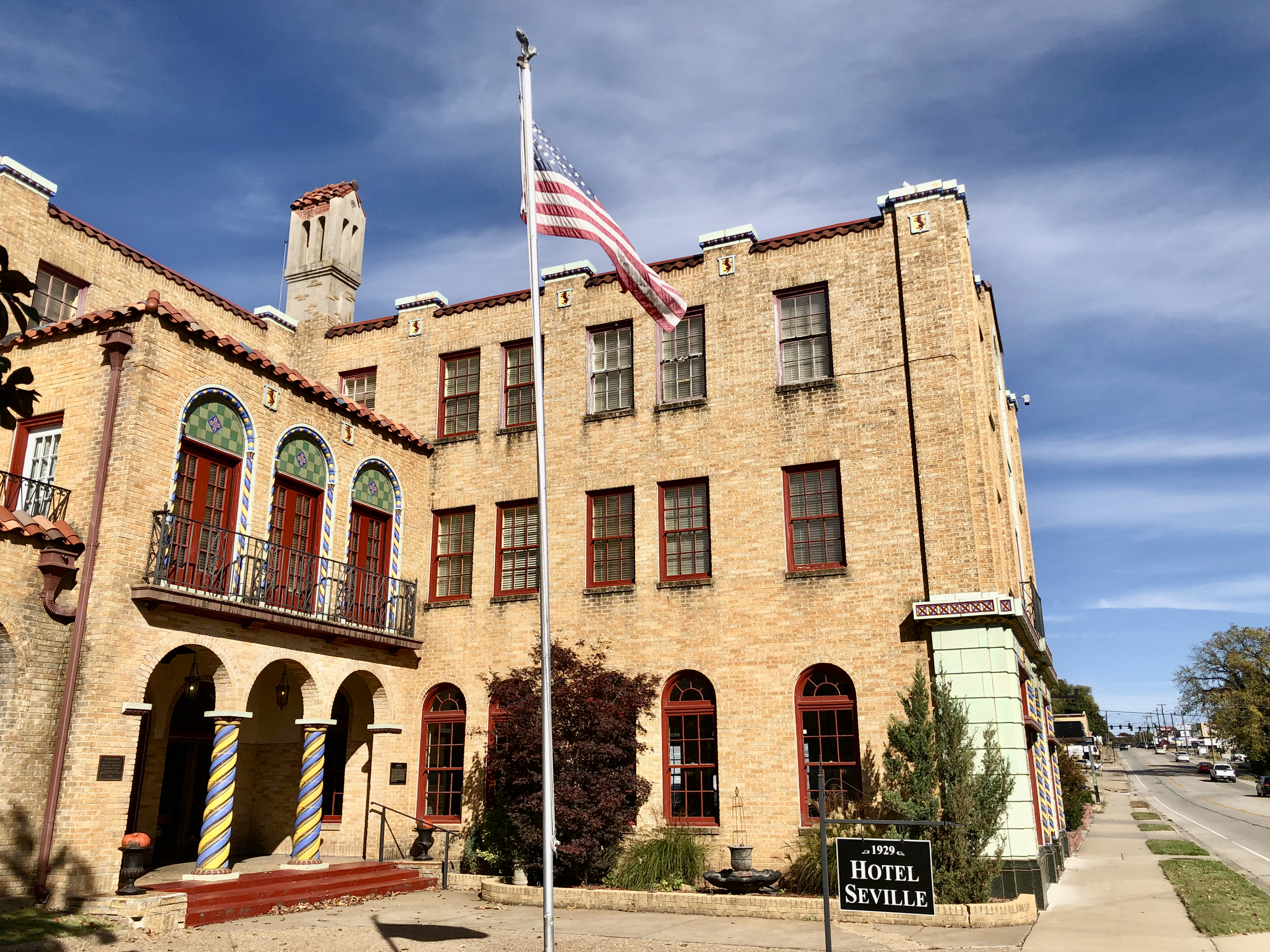
Spanish Revival (Mission) styled historic hotel (opened in 1929) in downtown Harrison, Arkansas

The National Trust for Historic Preservation has recognized the Harrison Courthouse Square Historic District. It contains a large number of the city's original commercial and governmental structures, including the still-used courthouse in the center of the square, the recently refurbished Lyric Theater, and the 1929 Hotel Seville, which underwent a complete restoration in 2008.

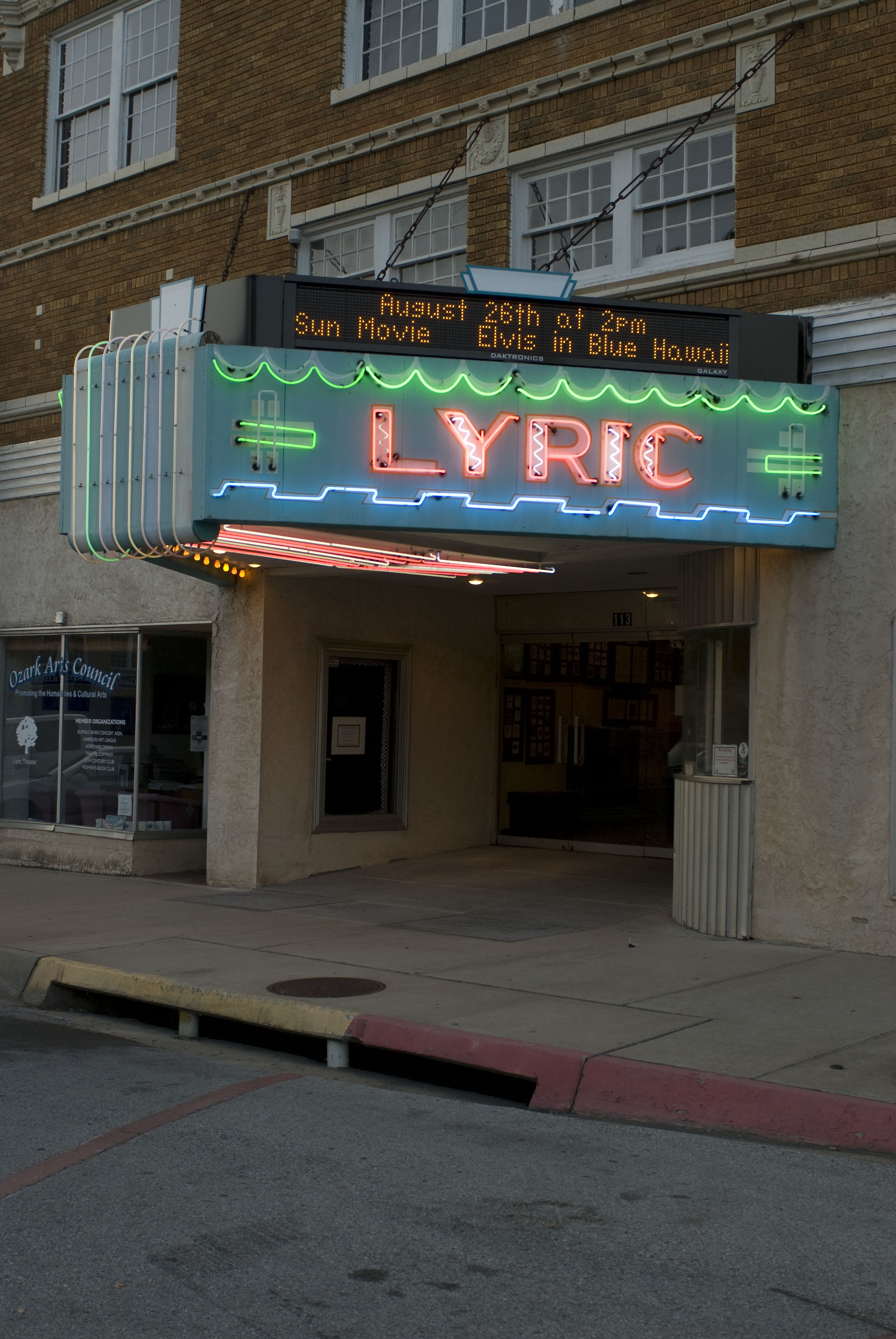
The Lyric Theatre in downtown Harrison hosts plays, concerts and films.

=== Ozark Arts Council ===
The Ozarks Arts Council is a 501(c)3 non-profit organization established in 1996 with the mission "To enrich lives by promoting the arts in Harrison and North Arkansas through exhibitions, performances, and education." It provides administrative support and distributes financial and in-kind donations to its member organizations:

- The Theatre Company
- Northark Drama
- Twentieth Century Club
- Woman's Book Club
- Ozark Children's Choir

The historic Lyric Theatre is managed by the Ozark Arts Council. Originally opened as a movie theater in 1929, it is now used for plays, community events, old movies and other gatherings.

== Parks and recreation ==
Harrison serves as the National Park Service's Buffalo National River headquarters. The park was established in the 1970s, and was the nation's first national river. The river flows for 135 miles (217 km), and there are over 59 different species of fish in it.

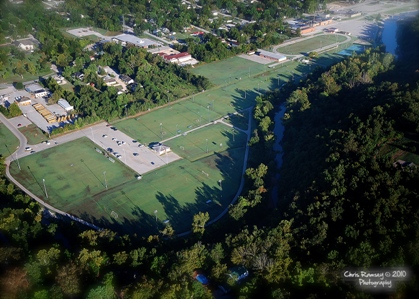
Anstaff Bank Soccer Complex

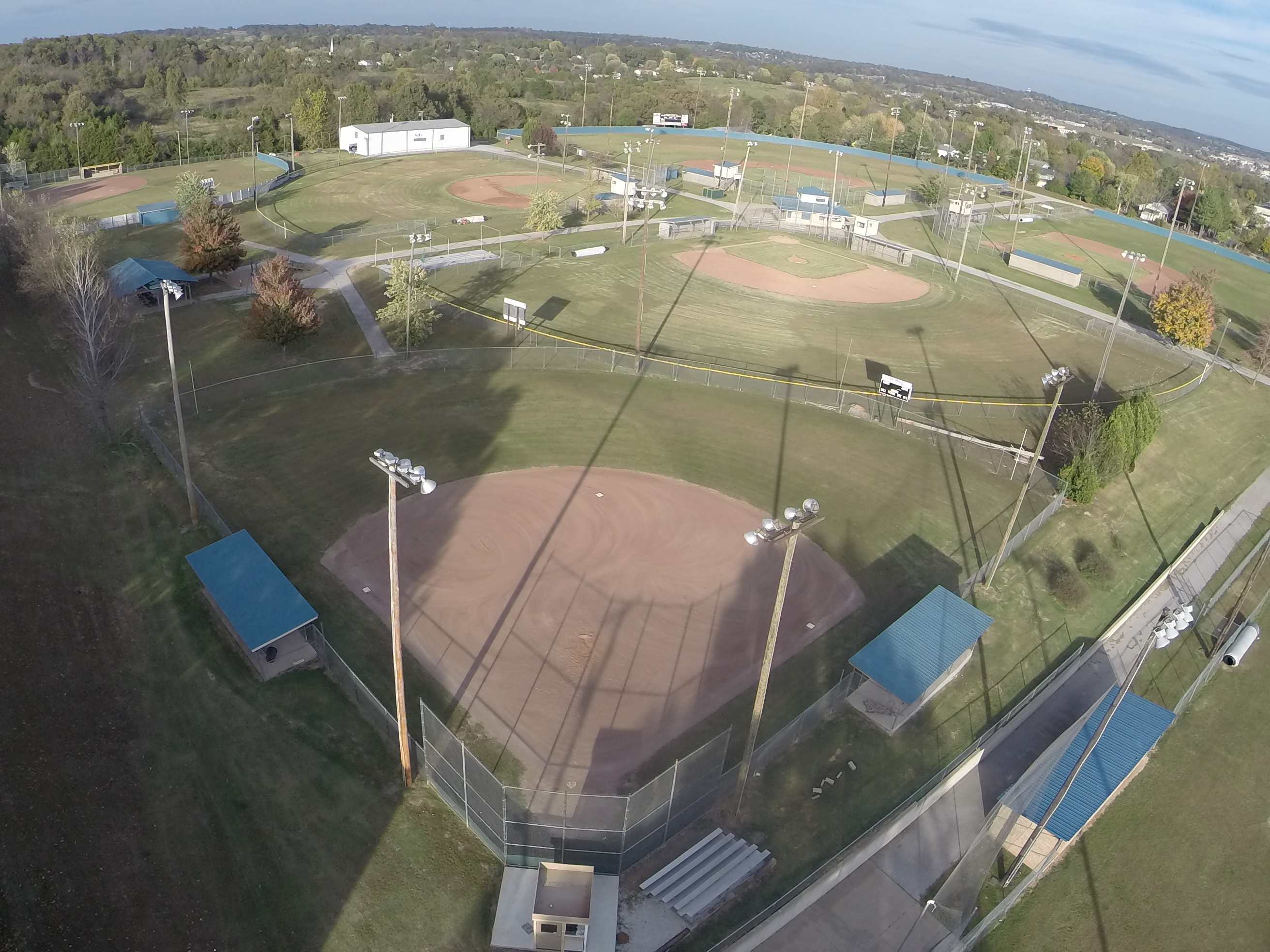
Equity Bank Sports Complex

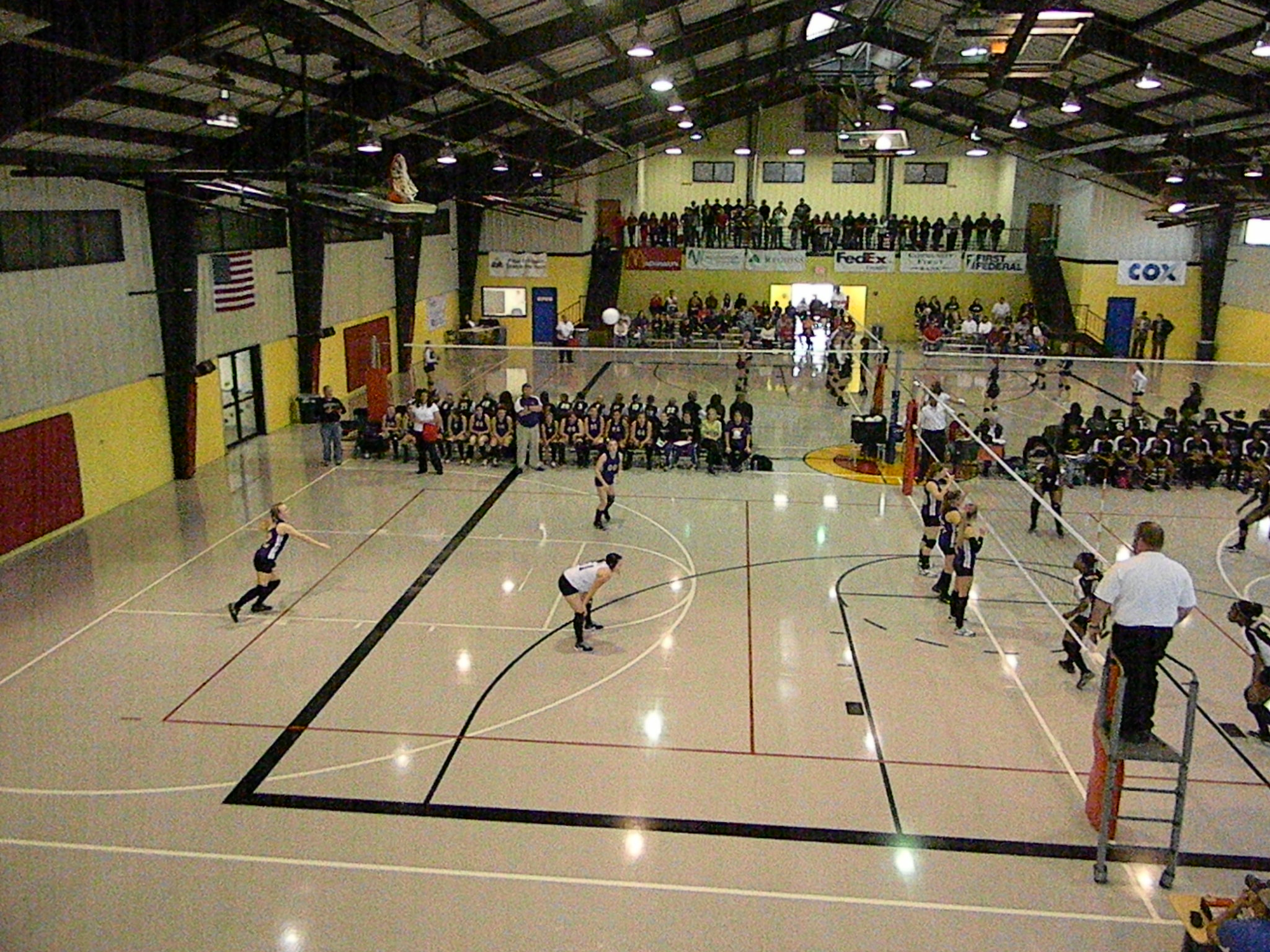
Brandon Burlsworth Youth Center hosts basketball and volleyball for youth and high school teams.

Crooked Creek, a nationally recognized "Blue Ribbon" smallmouth bass fishery, flows through Harrison.

As of May 2024, the Creekside Community Center is currently under construction. When complete, it will have an Olympic size pool, two more smaller pools, 2 high school regulation size basketball courts, and an indoor music venue. Construction is deemed to end before 2025.

== Education ==
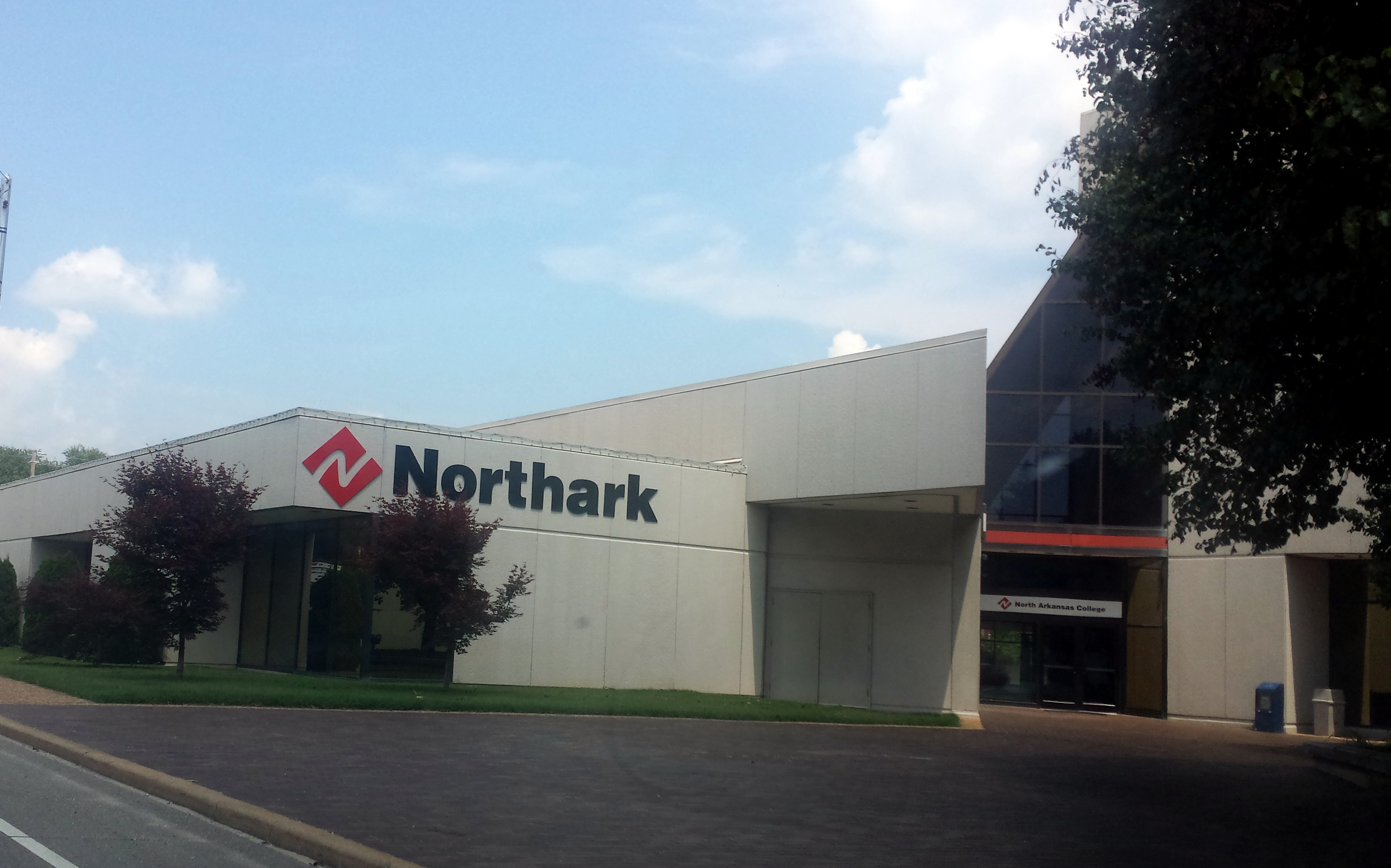
Northark College

Residents are served by the Harrison School District. The Harrison High School mascot is the Golden Goblin. Harrison is also home to North Arkansas College (Northark). The Harrison School District had been a member of the North Central Association of Colleges and Schools since 1936 until its dissolution in 2014. It is now a member of the AdvancED commission.

== Media ==
=== Print ===
Harrison and Boone County have been served by the local newspaper The Harrison Daily Times since 1876.

=== Radio ===
Radio stations broadcasting from Harrison include:

- KBPB 91.9 FM (Religious)
- KCWD 96.1 FM (Classic Rock)
- KHBZ 102.9 FM (Country)
- KHOZ 900 AM (Nostalgia)
- KHOZ 94.9 FM (Nostalgia)
- KBHQ 100.7 FM (Classic Rock)

=== Television ===
Harrison has two stations of its own, including KXMP-LD and K26GS-D (both in Harrison proper). Harrison KTKO-TV 8.1, also known as TKO 8, provides coverage for local events including Goblin Sports, Harrison City Council meetings, and Boone County Quorum Court meetings. It is an affiliate of the Me-TV Network showing a wide range of classic television programming. K26GS is a This TV affiliate and also provides local programming to Harrison. KWBM, a Daystar affiliate, is also licensed to Harrison, however its offices are in Springfield, while its transmitter is located in Taney County, Missouri. KWBM leases part of its signal to Springfield Fox affiliate KRBK, in order to relay Fox TV coverage to Harrison and the southern portions of the Springfield TV market.

Harrison is part of the Springfield, Missouri, television market, and receives stations from Springfield, including KYTV (NBC), KOLR (CBS), KSPR (ABC), KOZL (MyNetworkTV), and KRBK (Fox).

It was also featured in a BBC TV show in the UK named Miriam's Big American Adventure, hosted by Miriam Margolyes.

== Infrastructure ==
=== Transportation ===
A segment of the route between Seligman, Missouri and Harrison, Arkansas was operated as the Arkansas & Ozarks Railroad from 1948 to 1960.

Harrison is served by Boone County Regional Airport. Scheduled flights from Harrison to Memphis, Tennessee, and Dallas/Fort Worth, Texas, are offered by Southern Airways Express. The closest airport with service from a carrier aside from Southern Airways Express is Branson Airport (served only by Frontier Airlines), and the closest airport served by multiple airlines or a legacy carrier is Northwest Arkansas National Airport.

Highways in the area include:

- US 62/US 412
- U.S. Highway 65
- U.S. Route 65 Business
- Arkansas Highway 7
- Arkansas Highway 43
- Arkansas Highway 123
- Arkansas Highway 392
- Arkansas Highway 397
- Arkansas Highway 980

=== Health care ===
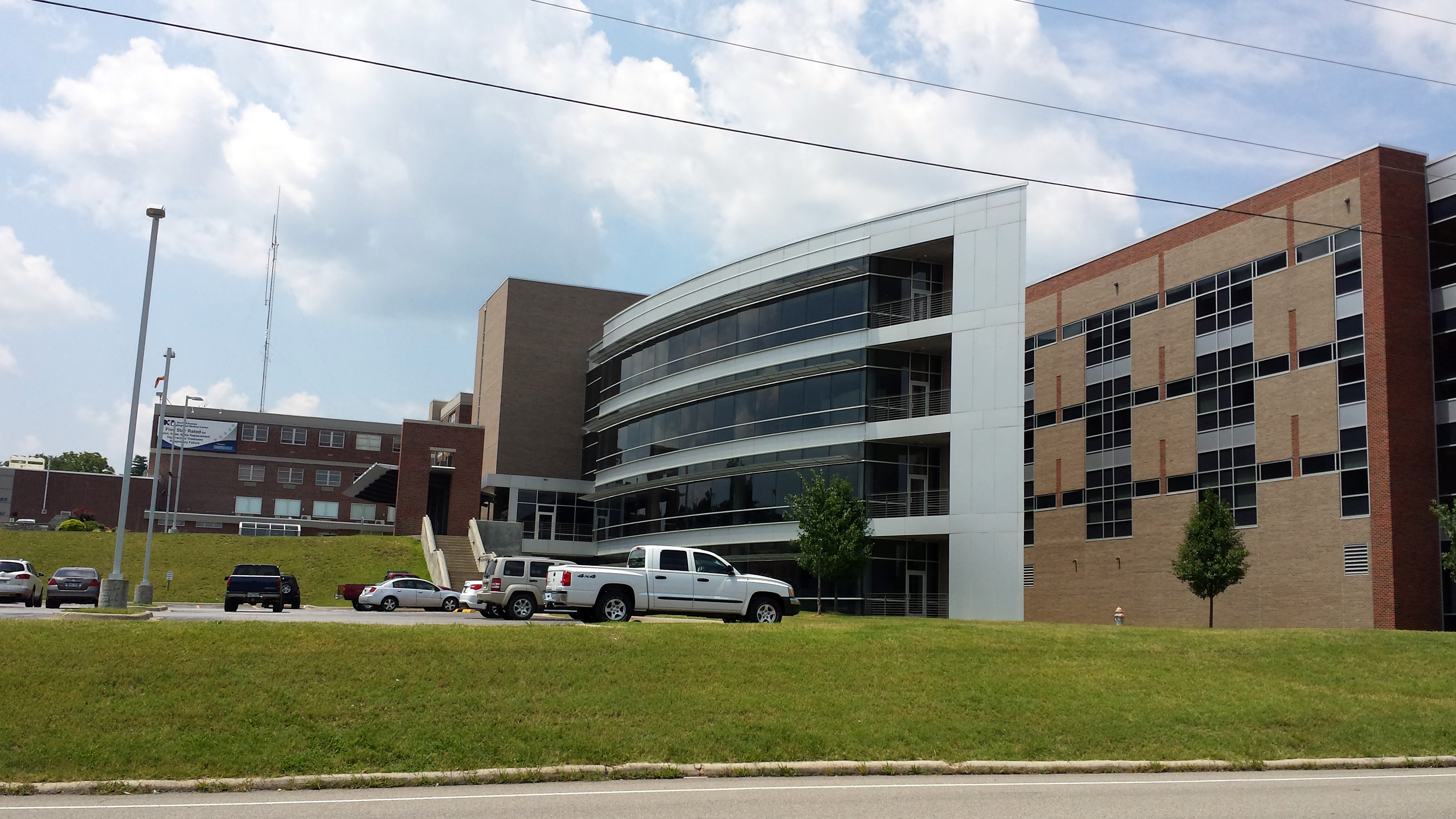
North Arkansas Regional Medical Center

The North Arkansas Regional Medical Center is in Harrison.

== Notable people ==
- Daniel Boatwright, Democratic politician in California
- Brandon Burlsworth, All-American offensive lineman, played for the Arkansas Razorbacks in the late 1990s; drafted by the Indianapolis Colts in the third round of the 1999 NFL draft
- John Burris, politician
- Faye Della Wilson Copeland, born in Harrison, along with her husband Ray became the oldest couple sentenced to death in the U.S.
- George J. Crump, Confederate officer, state legislator, lawyer, and U.S. marshal
- John Paul Hammerschmidt, U.S. representative, 1967–1993, author of the law preserving the Buffalo National River as a free-flowing stream and adding it to the National Park System in 1972
- Ben C. Henley, lawyer, businessman, and chairman of the Arkansas Republican Party from 1955 to 1962, U.S. Senate candidate in 1956, lived in Harrison
- J. Smith Henley, federal judge, retired to senior status in Harrison; the federal building in Harrison is named in his honor
- Elgin Bryce Holt, geologist
- Courtney Rae Hudson, Arkansas Supreme Court justice, was born in Harrison
- H. Dale Jackson, ethicist
- Uvalde Lindsey, politician
- Brian McComas, country-western singer, originally from Harrison
- Bryce Molder, professional golfer, was born in Harrison
- Gracie Pfost, first woman elected to Congress from Idaho, was born in Harrison
- Charles Robinson, Arkansas state treasurer; native of Harrison
- Tim Sherrill, former pitcher for the St. Louis Cardinals from 1990 to 1991
- Vance Trimble, Pulitzer Prize-winning journalist
- Robert Wadley, politician
- William Wirt Watkins, politician
- John A. White, president of the University of Arkansas
- Jack Williams, Medal of Honor recipient

== In popular culture ==
In 2020, the video "Holding a Black Lives Matter Sign in America's Most Racist Town" was filmed in Harrison.

== See also ==
- List of sundown towns in the United States
