= National Register of Historic Places listings in Boone County, Arkansas =

Location of Boone County in Arkansas

This is a list of the National Register of Historic Places listings in Boone County, Arkansas.

This is intended to be a complete list of the properties and districts on the National Register of Historic Places in Boone County, Arkansas, United States. The locations of National Register properties and districts for which the latitude and longitude coordinates are included below, may be seen in a map.

There are 21 properties and districts listed on the National Register in the county.

Contents: Counties in Arkansas
- Arkansas
- Ashley
- Baxter
- Benton
- Boone
- Bradley
- Calhoun
- Carroll
- Chicot
- Clark
- Clay
- Cleburne
- Cleveland
- Columbia
- Conway
- Craighead
- Crawford
- Crittenden
- Cross
- Dallas
- Desha
- Drew
- Faulkner
- Franklin
- Fulton
- Garland
- Grant
- Greene
- Hempstead
- Hot Spring
- Howard
- Independence
- Izard
- Jackson
- Jefferson
- Johnson
- Lafayette
- Lawrence
- Lee
- Lincoln
- Little River
- Logan
- Lonoke
- Madison
- Marion
- Miller
- Mississippi
- Monroe
- Montgomery
- Nevada
- Newton
- Ouachita
- Perry
- Phillips
- Pike
- Poinsett
- Polk
- Pope
- Prairie
- Pulaski (Little Rock)
- Randolph
- St. Francis
- Saline
- Scott
- Searcy
- Sebastian
- Sevier
- Sharp
- Stone
- Union
- Van Buren
- Washington
- White
- Woodruff
- Yell

This National Park Service list is complete through NPS recent listings posted April 24, 2026.

== Current listings ==
	Name on the Register	Image	Date listed	Location	City or town	Description
1	Elliott and Anna Barham House	Elliott and Anna Barham House	January 21, 2004 (#03001453)	4085 West St. 36°17′02″N 92°54′58″W	Zinc	
2	Bear Creek Motel	Bear Creek Motel	March 13, 2001 (#01000175)	U.S. Highway 65; 36°17′30″N 93°10′55″W	Bear Creek Springs	
3	Bergman High School		September 10, 1992 (#92001203)	County Road 48; 36°18′48″N 93°01′02″W	Bergman	
4	Boone County Courthouse	Boone County Courthouse	July 21, 1976 (#76000387)	Courthouse Sq. 36°13′49″N 93°06′29″W	Harrison	
5	Boone County Jail	Boone County Jail	December 12, 1976 (#76000388)	Central Ave. and Willow St. 36°13′45″N 93°06′30″W	Harrison	
6	Carrollton Road-Carrollton Segment		May 20, 2008 (#08000432)	County Road 917, Terrapin Creek Rd., and Dunkard Rd. between U.S. Highway 412 and Green Hill Rd. 36°16′05″N 93°17′13″W	Carrollton	
7	Cottonwood School #45		October 4, 2002 (#02001078)	Cottonwood and Dubuque Rd. 36°24′19″N 93°06′08″W	Self	
8	Cricket and Crest Tunnels Historic District	Cricket and Crest Tunnels Historic District	September 19, 2007 (#07000954)	Under and west of Old U.S. Highway 65; 36°26′39″N 93°11′29″W	Omaha	A pair of railroad tunnels either side of Omaha.
9	Duncan House	Duncan House	September 28, 2005 (#05001065)	610 W. Central Ave. 36°13′52″N 93°06′53″W	Harrison	
10	Evans-Kirby House	Evans-Kirby House	January 20, 2005 (#04001505)	611 S. Pine St. 36°13′33″N 93°06′40″W	Harrison	
11	Everton School	Everton School	September 10, 1992 (#92001205)	Main St. 36°09′12″N 92°54′25″W	Everton	
12	Grubb Springs School	Grubb Springs School	March 29, 1996 (#96000329)	Northeastern corner of the junction of Highways 43 and 397; 36°13′12″N 93°08′59″W	Harrison	
13	Haggard Ford Swinging Bridge	Haggard Ford Swinging Bridge	June 30, 1995 (#95000790)	Over Bear Creek at Cottonwood Rd., 8 miles north of Harrison; 36°20′45″N 93°07′50″W	Harrison	
14	Harrison Courthouse Square Historic District	Harrison Courthouse Square Historic District	May 6, 1999 (#99000523)	Roughly bounded by N. Walnut, W. Ridge, N. Willow, and W. Stephenson Sts. 36°13′51″N 93°06′28″W	Harrison	
15	Harrison High School	Harrison High School	January 24, 2007 (#06001284)	124 S. Cherry St. 36°13′30″N 93°06′38″W	Harrison	
16	Hotel Seville	Hotel Seville	May 19, 1994 (#94000443)	Northwestern corner of the junction of Vine and Ridge Sts. 36°13′56″N 93°06′27″W	Harrison	
17	Missouri and North Arkansas Depot-Bellefonte		June 11, 1992 (#92000601)	Southeastern corner of the junction of Center St. and Keeter Dr. 36°12′10″N 93°02′47″W	Bellefonte	
18	Rose Hill Cemetery		May 13, 2025 (#100011832)	601 West Prospect Avenue; 36°14′00″N 93°06′02″W	Harrison	
19	Twelve Oaks	Twelve Oaks	January 20, 2010 (#09001237)	7210 Highway 7 South; 36°10′00″N 93°07′23″W	Harrison	
20	Valley Springs School	Valley Springs School	September 10, 1992 (#92001204)	1 School St. 36°09′28″N 92°59′36″W	Valley Springs	
21	Zinc Swinging Bridge-BO0162		January 24, 2007 (#06001286)	8039 Washington St. 36°17′05″N 92°54′55″W	Zinc	

== See also ==
- List of National Historic Landmarks in Arkansas
- National Register of Historic Places listings in Arkansas
