= Valley Springs School District =

School district in Arkansas

Address
- 7349 School Street Valley Springs, Arkansas, 72682; United States
- Coordinates: 36°9′28″N 92°59′37″W

District information
- Type: Public
- Grades: PK–12
- Established: 1870
- Superintendent: Dr. Kyle Mallett
- Budget: $8.75 million (2020-2021)
- NCES District ID: 0513350

Students and staff
- Enrollment: 859 (2020-2021)
- Staff: 77.24 (on an FTE basis)
- Student–teacher ratio: 11.12
- District mascot: Tiger
- Colors: Green and White

Other information
- Website: valley.k12.ar.us

Valley Springs School District is a public school district in Boone County, Arkansas, United States which serves the cities of Bellefonte, Everton and Valley Springs along with surrounding unincorporated areas within Boone County.

== Schools ==
- Valley Springs High School
- Valley Springs Middle School
- Valley Springs Elementary School

=== Valley Springs High School ===
Valley Springs High School serves ninth through twelfth grades. Based on the 2009-2010 academic year, the total enrollment in the school was 283 and total full-time teachers was 30.30, with a teacher/student ratio of 9.34.

=== Valley Springs Middle School ===
Valley Springs Middle School serves fifth through eighth grades. Based on the 2009-2010 academic year, the total enrollment in the school was 287 and total full-time teachers was 33, with a teacher/student ratio of 8.70.

=== Valley Springs Elementary School ===
Valley Springs Elementary School serves preschool through fourth grades. Based on the 2009-2010 academic year, the total enrollment in the school was 413 and total full-time teachers was 26.70, with a teacher/student ratio of 15.47.

== Staffing ==
Based on the 2009-2010 academic year, the total full-time staff of the Valley Springs School District was 175. The total full-time teachers was 90. The total number of non-teaching staff (including 5 administrators) was 85.

== Demographics ==
Within the geographic area covered by the Valley Springs School District, there were 1,046 individuals under the age of 18, during the 2009-2010 academic year.

== See also ==
- List of school districts in Arkansas
