= Bellefonte station =

- Missouri and North Arkansas Depot--Bellefonte
- U.S. National Register of Historic Places
- Location within Arkansas Location within the United States
- Location: SE corner of Center St. and Cash St., Bellefonte, Arkansas
- Coordinates: 36°12′10″N 93°2′47″W
- Area: less than one acre
- Built: 1901
- Built by: Missouri & North Arkansas Railroad
- Architectural style: Late 19th And Early 20th Century American Movements, Plain Traditional
- MPS: Historic Railroad Depots of Arkansas MPS
- NRHP reference No.: 92000601
- Added to NRHP: June 11, 1992

The Missouri and North Arkansas Depot is a historic railroad station at Center Street and Cash Streets in Bellefonte, Arkansas. It is a small single-story structure with a wide low-pitch gable-on-hip roof and a rubble-stone exterior over a wood frame. A small shed-roof addition enlarges the building slightly to the north, while a larger cross-gable addition projects from the rear. It was built in 1901 by the Missouri and North Arkansas Railroad to serve the area's passenger traffic. It is a rare example of rubble-over-frame construction for railroad stations in the region.

The building was listed on the National Register of Historic Places in 1992.

== See also ==
- National Register of Historic Places listings in Boone County, Arkansas
