= Everton School =

- U.S. National Register of Historic Places
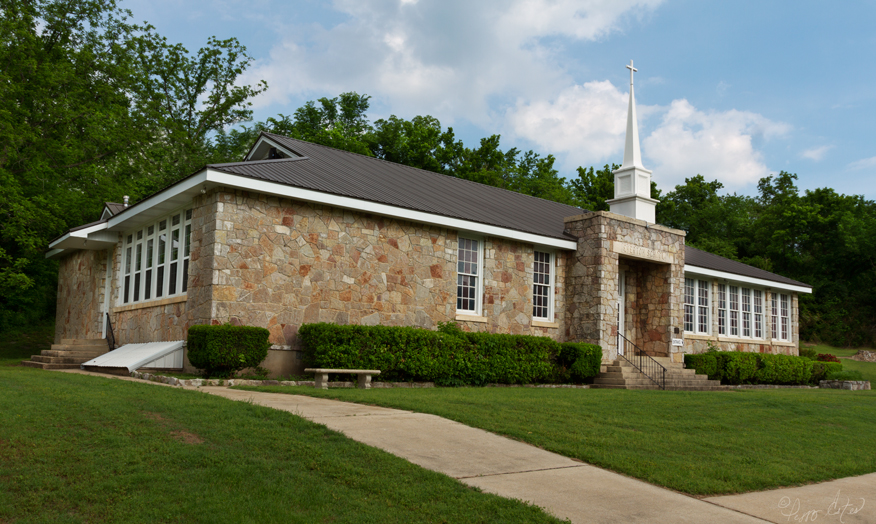

- Location within Arkansas Location within the United States
- Location: Main St., Everton, Arkansas
- Coordinates: 36°9′12″N 92°54′25″W
- Area: less than one acre
- Built by: Works Progress Administration
- Architectural style: Bungalow/craftsman
- MPS: Public Schools in the Ozarks MPS
- NRHP reference No.: 92001205
- Added to NRHP: September 10, 1992

The Everton Methodist Church, formerly the Everton School, is located on Main Street in Everton, Arkansas. Its building, a single-story stone structure with Craftsman styling, was built in 1939 with funding from the Works Progress Administration, and served as the local school from 1939 to 1959. The building was listed on the National Register of Historic Places in 1992 for its role in the educational history of the area. In 2023, the congregation disaffiliated from the United Methodist Church.

== See also ==
- National Register of Historic Places listings in Boone County, Arkansas
