= Valley Springs School =

- U.S. National Register of Historic Places
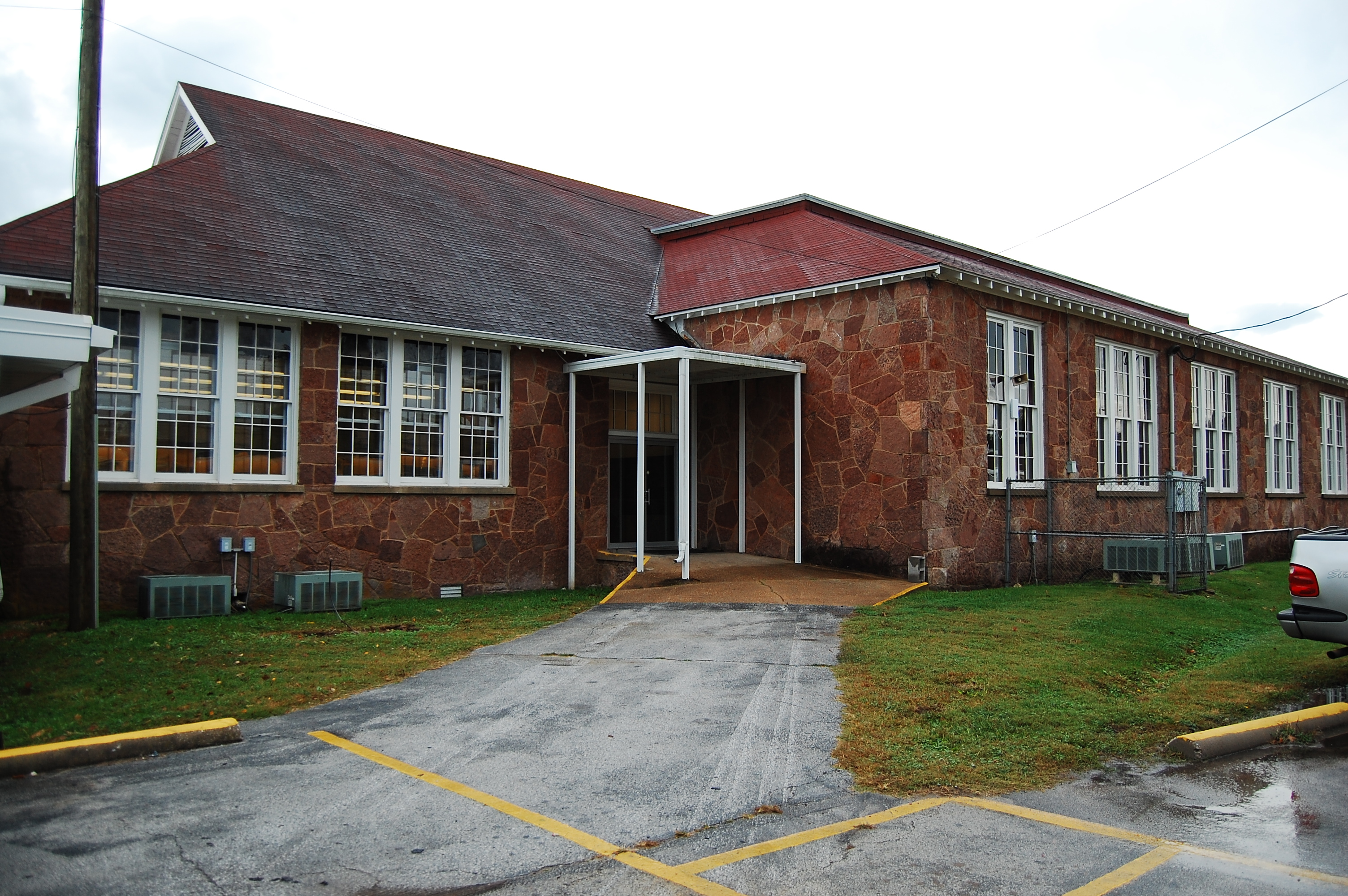

- Location within Arkansas Location within the United States
- Location: 1 School St. Valley Springs, Arkansas
- Coordinates: 36°9′28″N 92°59′36″W
- Area: 1.1 acres (0.45 ha)
- Built by: Works Progress Administration
- Architectural style: Bungalow/craftsman
- MPS: Public Schools in the Ozarks MPS
- NRHP reference No.: 92001204
- Added to NRHP: September 10, 1992

The Valley Springs School is a historic school building at 1 School Street in Valley Springs, Arkansas. Now part of a larger school complex, it is a single-story fieldstone structure with a wide south-facing facade, and a gable-on-hip roof. There are two entrance pavilions, marked by steeply pitched gable projections. The left entrance is deeply recessed under a rounded archway, while that on the right, although also recessed, has a flat-roofed pavilion sheltering access to it. Fenestration is provided by groups of sash windows arranged symmetrically across the facade. The school was built in 1940 with funding from the Works Progress Administration, and originally served as the community's high school.

The building was listed on the National Register of Historic Places in 1992.

== See also ==
- National Register of Historic Places listings in Boone County, Arkansas
