= Elliott and Anna Barham House =

Historic house in Arkansas, United States

- U.S. National Register of Historic Places
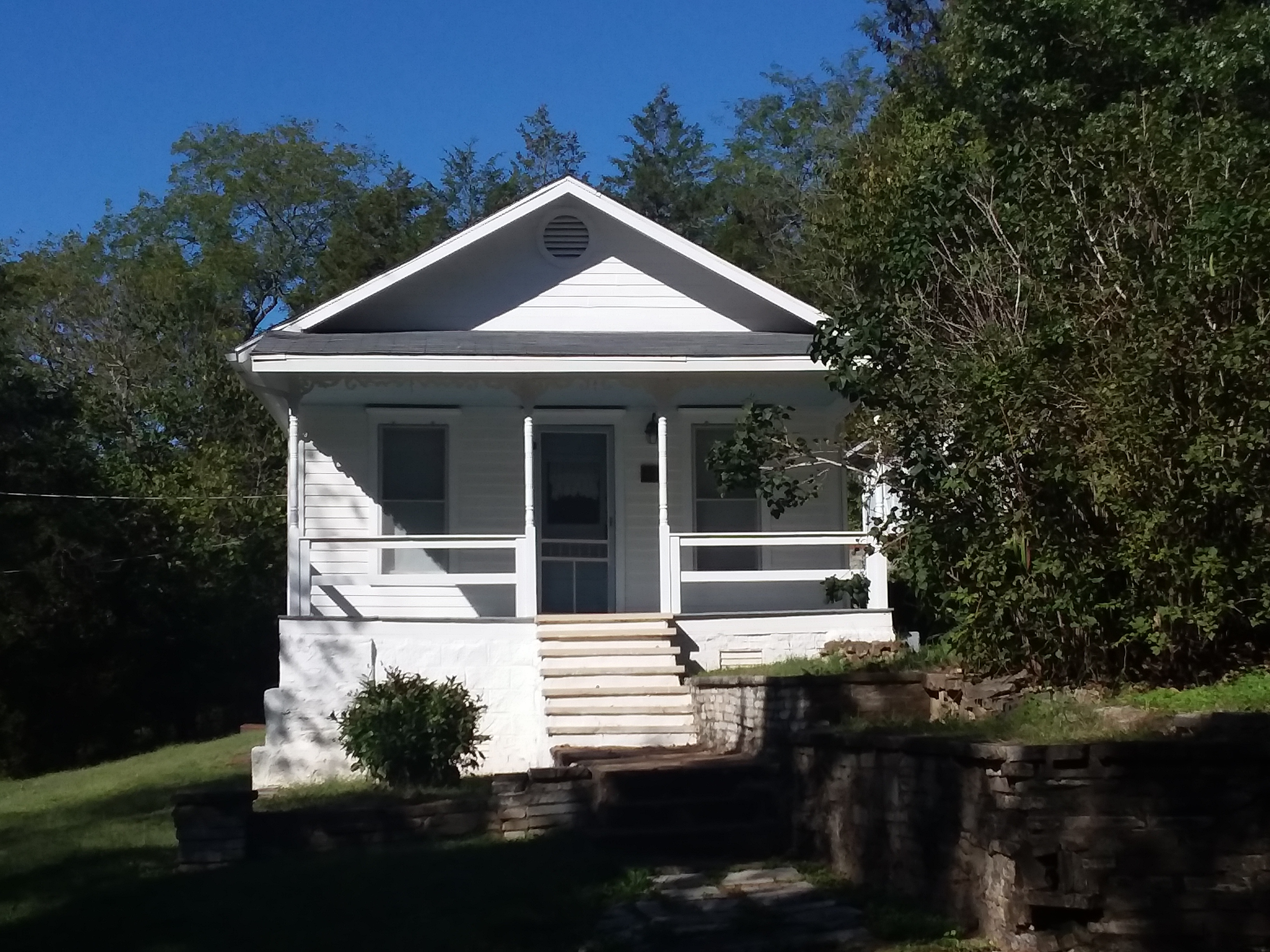
- The Barham House, September 2018

- Location within Arkansas Location within the United States
- Location: 4085 West Street, Zinc, Arkansas
- Coordinates: 36°17′2″N 92°54′58″W
- Area: 1.3 acres (0.53 ha)
- Built: 1917
- Architectural style: Folk Victorian
- NRHP reference No.: 03001453
- Added to NRHP: January 21, 2004

The Elliott and Anna Barham House is a historic residence in Zinc, Arkansas. It is listed on the National Register of Historic Places. It was the home of Elliott Barham, son of the founder of Zinc, Arkansas, and his wife, Anna Barham.

== Description ==
The house, located at 4085 West Street, is a narrow 1 1/2-story wood-frame cottage, with a symmetrical front framed by gingerbread decoration and a porch with turned posts. Built into the side of a hill, its stone-walled basement is fully exposed on the south side. Constructed in 1917, it is a well-preserved local example of Folk Victorian design.

The house was listed on the National Register of Historic Places on January 21, 2004.

== See also ==
- National Register of Historic Places listings in Boone County, Arkansas
