= Twelve Oaks (Harrison, Arkansas) =

Historic house in Arkansas, United States

- U.S. National Register of Historic Places
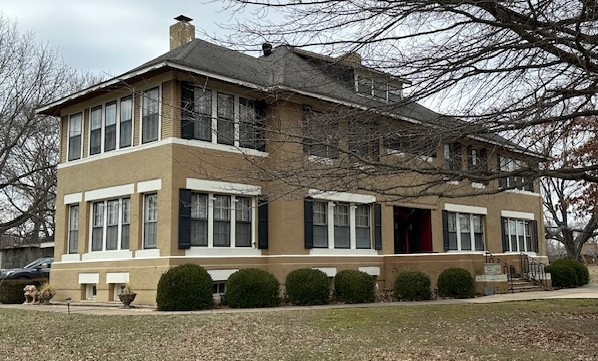
- Twelve Oaks, February 2025

- Location within Arkansas Location within the United States
- Location: 7210 AR 7 S, Harrison, Arkansas
- Coordinates: 36°9′42″N 93°7′22″W
- Area: 8.1 acres (3.3 ha)
- Built: 1922
- Architectural style: Bungalow/craftsman, Colonial Revival
- NRHP reference No.: 09001237
- Added to NRHP: January 20, 2010

Twelve Oaks, or the J.W. Bass House, is a historic farm estate at 7210 Arkansas Highway 7 South in rural Boone County, Arkansas, south of Harrison. The main house is a dramatic and architecturally eclectic two-story building with a variety of Craftsman, Colonial Revival, and Mission style details. It is a stucco-finished concrete construction, whose roof has exposed rafter tails, and was originally finished in tile, replaced after a 1973 tornado extensively damaged the property. At the time of its construction in 1922 (at a cost of $250,000), it was one of the finest plantation houses in the state. It was built by J. W. Bass, a businessman responsible for the construction of a number of Harrison's finest buildings, who developed a 1,600-acre (650 ha) farm south of the city, with this property as its centerpiece. It was named "Twelve Oaks" after a grove of twelve large oak trees, none of which survived the 1973 tornado.

The house was listed on the National Register of Historic Places in 2010.

== See also ==
- National Register of Historic Places listings in Boone County, Arkansas
