= Arkansas Highway 206 =

State highway in Arkansas, United States

Highway 206
- Segments of AR 206 highlighted in red

Route information
- Maintained by ArDOT
- Existed: July 10, 1957–present

Section 1
- Length: 14.807 mi (23.830 km)
- West end: AR 43
- East end: US 62 / US 65 / US 412 in Bellefonte

Section 2
- Length: 5.541 mi (8.917 km)
- West end: US 65
- East end: CR 4019

Section 3
- Length: 2.952 mi (4.751 km)
- West end: AR 14 at Ralph
- East end: CR 6022

Location
- Country: United States
- State: Arkansas
- Counties: Boone, Marion

Highway system
- Arkansas Highway System; Interstate; US; State; Business; Spurs; Suffixed; Scenic; Heritage
← AR 205	→ AR 207

Highway 206 (AR 206 and Hwy. 206) is a designation for three east–west state highways in the Ozark Mountains in the United States. Each segment was created during periods of state highway systemwide expansions ordered by the Arkansas General Assembly to add system mileage in every county, first in 1957, and again in 1973. All are low-traffic highways providing connectivity between rural communities and major highways in the area. All are maintained by the Arkansas Department of Transportation (ArDOT).

== Route description ==
The ArDOT maintains Highway 206 like all other parts of the state highway system. As a part of these responsibilities, the department tracks the volume of traffic using its roads in surveys using a metric called average annual daily traffic (AADT). ArDOT estimates the traffic level for a segment of roadway for any average day of the year in these surveys. As of 2019, AADT was estimated at 1,300 vehicles per day (VPD) near Bellefonte and as low as 610 VPD near the western terminus of Section 1. Section 2 had an AADT of 830 VPD, with Section 3 ranging from 200 to 20 VPD. For reference, the American Association of State Highway and Transportation Officials (AASHTO), classifies roads with fewer than 400 vehicles per day as a very low volume local road.

No segment of Highway 206 has been listed as part of the National Highway System, a network of roads important to the nation's economy, defense, and mobility.

=== Section 1 ===
The route begins in Boone County southwest of Harrison in the Ozark Mountains at a junction with Highway 43. Highway 206 runs south through a rural area of woods and hayfields to the unincorporated community of Gaither. The highway turns east toward an area known as Krooked Kreek, where it junctions with Arkansas Highway 7 (an Arkansas Scenic Byway). East of this junction, Highway 206 continues through Elmwood before turning north toward the small town of Bellefonte. Shortly after entering Bellefonte, Highway 206 meets US 62/US 65/US 412, where it terminates.

=== Section 2 ===
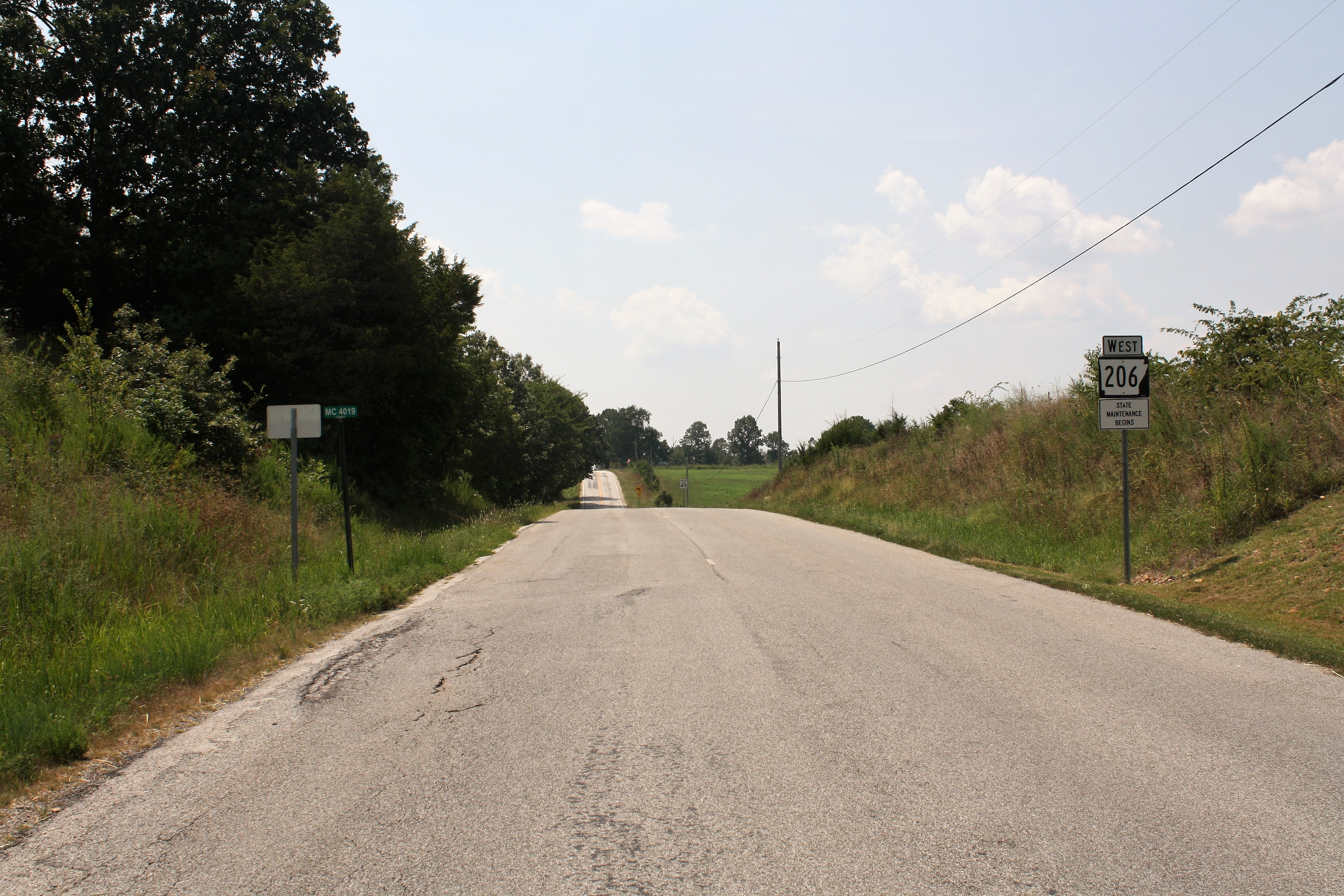
State maintenance begins at the Boone-Marion county line

.

In the southeast corner of Boone County, Highway 206 begins at US 65 southeast of Valley Springs and only 1.5 miles (2.4 km) north of the Newton County line. The highway winds east through sparsely populated Ozark Mountain countryside to the small town of Everton. East of Everton, the Highway 206 designation (and thus state maintenance) ends at the Marion County line. The roadway continues east as Marion County Road 4019 (CR 4019).

=== Section 3 ===
A third segment of Highway 206 begins in rural Marion County at a junction with Highway 14 at the unincorporated community of Ralph. The highway runs east through rural Ozark Mountain countryside for 2.952 miles (4.751 km), when state maintenance ends approximately four miles (6.4 km) west of Rush and the Buffalo National River. The roadway continues east as Marion CR 6022.

== History ==
The Arkansas General Assembly passed the Act 148 of 1957, the Milum Road Act, creating 10–12 miles (16–19 km) of new state highways in each county. As part of this system expansion, Highway 206 was created by the Arkansas State Highway Commission on July 10, 1957, between Gaither and Bellefonte. The alignment was slightly revised west of Highway 7 on January 28, 1959, and extended west to Highway 43 on June 29, 1960. The second Boone County segment was designated on March 28, 1973, in response to the Arkansas General Assembly's Act 9 of 1973, which directed county judges and state legislators to designate up to 12 miles (19 km) of county roads as state highways in each county. The Marion County segment was created two months later in response to the same act.

== Major intersections ==
County	Location	mi	km	Destinations	Notes
Boone		0.000	0.000	AR 43 – Compton, Ponca, Harrison	Western terminus
Boone		7.21	11.60	AR 7 (Scenic 7 Byway) – Harrison, Jasper	
Boone	Bellefonte	14.807	23.830	US 62 / US 65 / US 412 – Harrison, Mountain Home, Conway	Eastern terminus
Boone	Gap in route				
Boone		0.000	0.000	US 65 – Harrison, Marshall	Western terminus
Boone–Marion county line		5.541	8.917	End state maintenance, road continues as CR 4019	Eastern terminus
Gap in route
Marion	Ralph	0.000	0.000	AR 14	Western terminus
Marion		2.952	4.751	End state maintenance, road continues as CR 6022	Eastern terminus
1.000 mi = 1.609 km; 1.000 km = 0.621 mi

== Sources ==
- "Minutes of the Meeting of the Arkansas State Highway Commission" (PDF). Little Rock: Arkansas State Highway Commission. 1953–1969. OCLC 21798861. Archived from the original (PDF) on October 1, 2018.
- "Minutes of the Meeting of the Arkansas State Highway Commission" (PDF). Little Rock: Arkansas State Highway Commission. 1970–1979. OCLC 21798861. Archived from the original (PDF) on November 5, 2011.
- "Minutes of the Meeting of the Arkansas State Highway Commission" (PDF). Little Rock: Arkansas State Highway Commission. 1980–1989. OCLC 21798861.
- "Minutes of the Meeting of the Arkansas State Highway Commission" (PDF). Little Rock: Arkansas State Highway Commission. 1990–1999. OCLC 21798861. Archived from the original (PDF) on July 21, 2019.
- "Minutes of the Meeting of the Arkansas State Highway Commission" (PDF). Little Rock: Arkansas State Highway Commission. 2000–2009. OCLC 21798861.
- "Minutes of the Meeting of the Arkansas State Highway Commission" (PDF). Little Rock: Arkansas State Highway Commission. 2010–2019. OCLC 21798861. Archived from the original (PDF) on March 4, 2016.
