= Bellefonte, Arkansas =

Bellefonte
- Town
- Location of Bellefonte in Boone County, Arkansas.
- Coordinates: 36°12′00″N 93°02′49″W
- Country: United States
- State: Arkansas
- County: Boone
- Initially Incorporated: 1882
- Re-Incorporated: 1963

Government
  - Type: Council government
  - Mayor: Joe Hefley

Area
  - Total: 0.62 sq mi (1.61 km^{2})
  - Land: 0.62 sq mi (1.61 km^{2})
  - Water: 0 sq mi (0.00 km^{2})
- Elevation: 1,093 ft (333 m)

Population (2020)
  - Total: 411
  - Estimate (2025): 420 ▲
  - Density: 661.0/sq mi (255.21/km^{2})
- Time zone: UTC-6 (Central (CST))
  - Summer (DST): UTC-5 (CDT)
- FIPS code: 05-04900
- GNIS feature ID: 2405236

Bellefonte is a town in Boone County, Arkansas, United States. The population was 411 at the 2020 census. It is part of the Harrison Micropolitan Statistical Area. Bellefonte gained national attention in 2013 when the city's mayor, James Wiggs, was recognized as the oldest active mayor in the United States at 90 years of age.

== Geography ==
According to the United States Census Bureau, the town has a total area of 1.5 km^{2} (0.58 sq mi), all land.

=== List of highways ===
- US 62/US 412
- U.S. Highway 65
- Arkansas Highway 206

== History ==
The area known as Bellefonte was originally settled by a few families. The community expanded when two stores were established. The community got its name as campers noted the beautiful springs. It was suggested the area be called "Bellefonte", French for "beautiful fountains."

As there were no church organizations in the settlement, services were originally held in private homes. Circuit riders generally provided the services.

Bellefonte grew rapidly by the second half of the 1860s. A post office was established.

By the early 1870s, what was referred to as "North Arkansas College" (not to be confused with the modern community college by the same name in Harrison, Arkansas) was founded and students from all over the state attended. In modern times, this would be considered a high school. A grade school was also established in Bellefonte around the same time.

Bellefonte continued to grow, becoming a large town. A number of businesses developed and a town square was built. (By 1939, the town square was gone.) Businesses included doctors' offices, drugstores, a livery stable, various general stores, a leather factory, saloons, a cotton gin and a flour mill.

When Boone County was formed, Bellefonte was the largest town, larger than relatively new Harrison. Bellefonte expected it should have the county seat. After arguing and a vote, Harrison ultimately won.

Bellefonte became an incorporated town in 1882. In that year it was also damaged by a significant fire due to buildings being close together. In the same year, the North Arkansas College building burned. Bellefonte stopped being an incorporated town after this great fire, not re-incorporating until 1963.

By 1898 things had gotten better. Around 1901, the Missouri and North Arkansas Railroad ran through Bellefonte. This temporarily brought in business. There were various fires in 1912, which stifled Bellefonte until 1929 when things began to pick up a bit.

The Depression was directly felt in Bellefonte from 1930 to 1933. It took until 1935 for signs of relief.

== Demographics ==
Historical population
Census	Pop.	Note	%±
1880	296		—
1970	300		—
1980	393		31.0%
1990	361		−8.1%
2000	400		10.8%
2010	530		32.5%
2020	411		−22.5%
2025 (est.)	420	▲	2.2%
U.S. Decennial Census; 2018 Estimate

As of the census of 2010, there were 530 people, 197 households, and 124 families residing in the town. The population density was 261.8 people/km^{2} (678 people/mi^{2}). There were 173 housing units at an average density of 113.2 units/km^{2} (293 units/mi^{2}). The racial makeup of the town was 97.80% white and 1.30% of two or more races.

There were 157 households, out of which 33.1% had children under the age of 18 living with them, 55.4% were married couples living together, 14.0% had a female householder with no husband present, and 26.8% were non-families. 24.2% of all households were made up of individuals, and 6.4% had someone living alone who was 65 years of age or older. The average household size was 2.55 and the average family size was 3.02.

In the town, the population was spread out, with 29.3% under the age of 18, 9.5% from 18 to 24, 27.3% from 25 to 44, 21.8% from 45 to 64, and 12.3% who were 65 years of age or older. The median age was 31 years. For every 100 females there were 90.5 males. For every 100 females age 18 and over, there were 96.5 males.

The median income for a household in the town was $27,917, and the median income for a family was $30,729. Males had a median income of $24,500 versus $18,000 for females. The per capita income for the town was $12,958. About 13.7% of families and 18.2% of the population were below the poverty line, including 32.4% of those under age 18 and 3.6% of those age 65 or over.

In modern times, Bellefonte first appeared in the US Census in 1970. It also appeared in 1880. This says nothing about when the community began; it merely identifies when it was recognized in the US Census.

== School district ==
Bellefonte, along with Everton and Valley Springs, is within the Valley Springs School District.
