= Evans-Kirby House =

Historic house in Arkansas, United States

- U.S. National Register of Historic Places
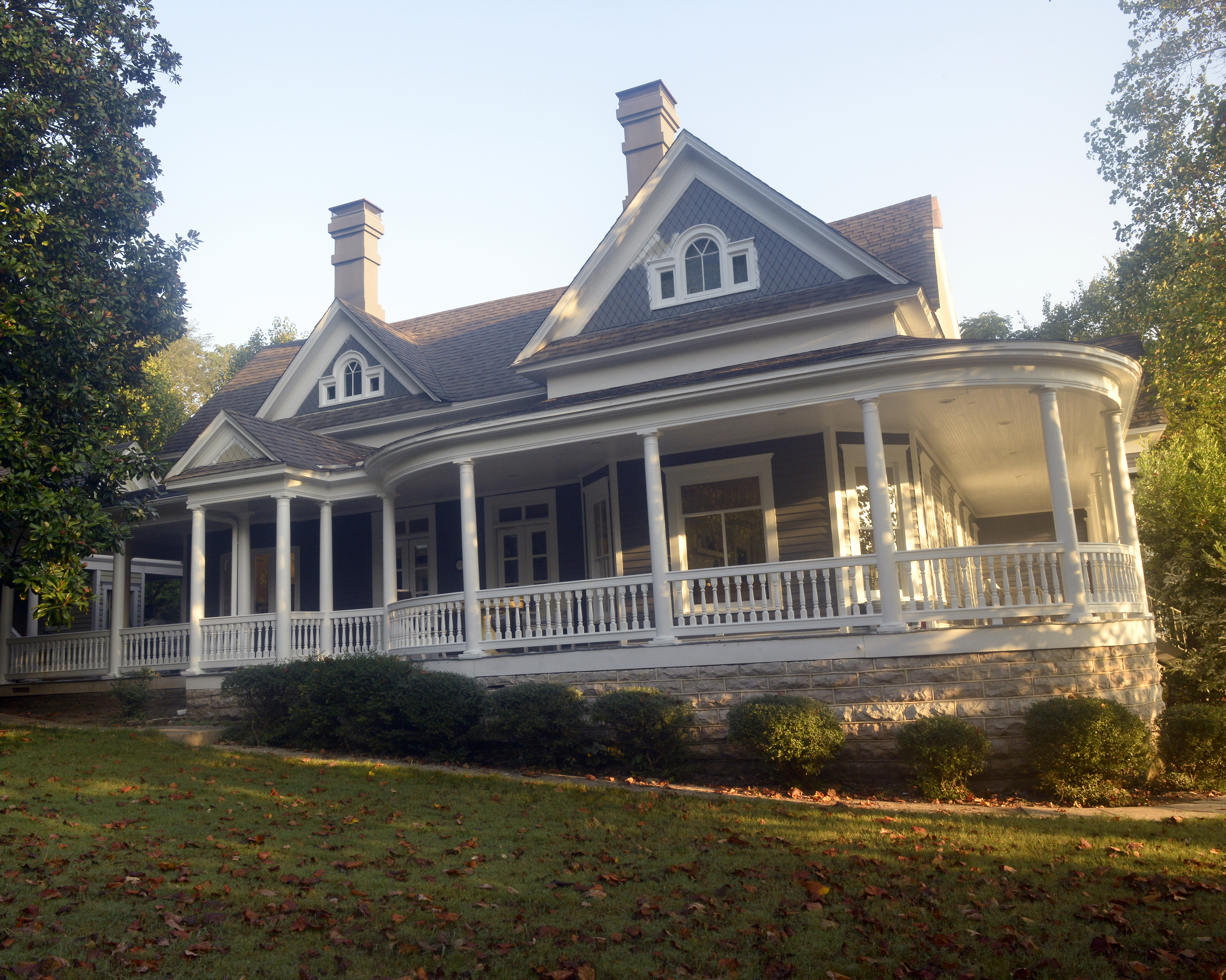

- Location within Arkansas Location within the United States
- Location: 611 S. Pine St., Harrison, Arkansas
- Coordinates: 36°13′33″N 93°6′40″W
- Area: 2 acres (0.81 ha)
- Built: 1895
- Built by: L. Rush, J.M. Hursch
- Architectural style: Queen Anne
- NRHP reference No.: 04001505
- Added to NRHP: January 20, 2005

The Evans-Kirby House is a historic house at 611 South Pine Street in Harrison, Arkansas. It is a two-story wood-frame structure on a sandstone foundation, with a busy roofline and asymmetrical massing typical of the Queen Anne style. The roof is punctuated with five dormers of different sizes and shapes, and the walls are finished with clapboards and decoratively-cut shingles. The porch is adorned with spindled friezes and brackets. The property also includes a period barn/carriage house and garage, the latter over an original smoke cellar. The house was built in 1895 for Dr. E.L. Evans, who sold it in 1906 to his brother-in-law, Dr. Frank Kirby.

The house was listed on the National Register of Historic Places in 2005.

== See also ==
- National Register of Historic Places listings in Boone County, Arkansas
