= Duncan House (Harrison, Arkansas) =

Historic house in Arkansas, United States

- U.S. National Register of Historic Places
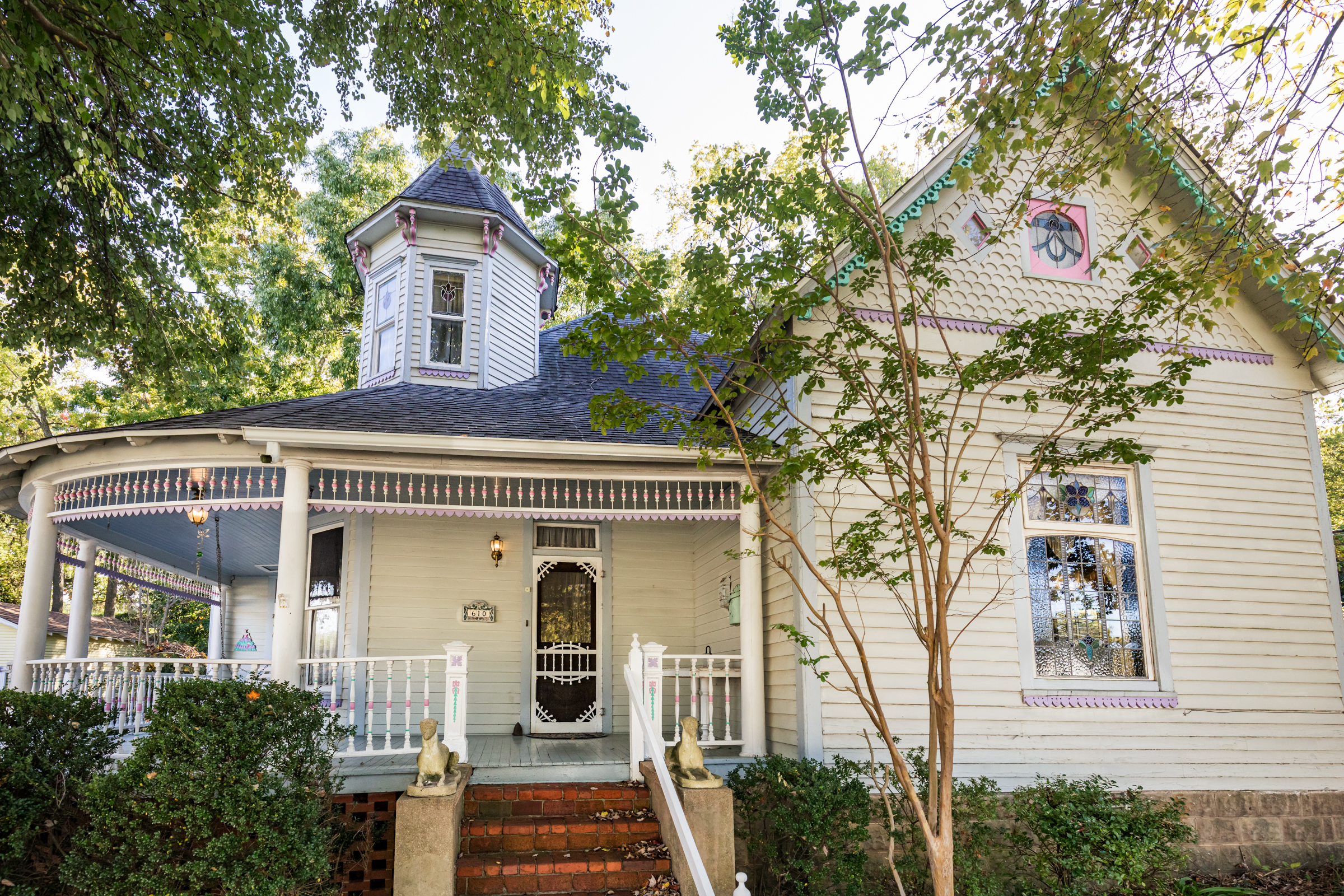

- Location within Arkansas Location within the United States
- Location: 610 W. Central Ave., Harrison, Arkansas
- Coordinates: 36°13′52″N 93°6′53″W
- Area: less than one acre
- Built: 1893
- Built by: William M. Duncan
- Architectural style: Queen Anne
- NRHP reference No.: 05001065
- Added to NRHP: September 28, 2005

The Duncan House is a historic house in 610 West Central Avenue in Harrison, Arkansas. It is a 1 1/2-story wood-frame structure, with asymmetrical massing and a busy roofline typical of the Queen Anne style. Distinctive features include metal cresting on the ridge lines, and a wraparound porch with tapered columns and turned balustrade. An octagonal cupola caps the roof. The house was built in 1893 by William Duncan, a local builder, for his own use. It is one of Harrison's few remaining houses of the period which has retained its Queen Anne features.

The house was listed on the National Register of Historic Places in 2005.

== See also ==
- National Register of Historic Places listings in Boone County, Arkansas
