= Cottonwood School No. 45 =

- Cottonwood School #45
- U.S. National Register of Historic Places
- Location within Arkansas Location within the United States
- Nearest city: Self, Arkansas
- Coordinates: 36°24′19″N 93°6′8″W
- Area: less than one acre
- Built: 1926
- Built by: Tom Morris, Charles Kennedy
- Architectural style: Bungalow/craftsman
- NRHP reference No.: 02001078
- Added to NRHP: October 4, 2002

The Cottonwood School No. 45 is a historic school building, now converted to a residence, in rural Boone County, Arkansas. It is located on Dubuque Road, northeast of the hamlet of Self. It is a single-story Craftsman style structure, finished in rubblestone veneer on a concrete foundation. A gabled porch extends across the central portion of the main facade, supported by three tapered posts on stone piers. The main roof is a gable-on-hip form. The school was built in 1926, and served the local community as a school and meeting place until 1945. It was converted to residential use in 1948, and underwent major rehabilitation in the 1980s.

The building was listed on the National Register of Historic Places in 2002.

== See also ==
- National Register of Historic Places listings in Boone County, Arkansas
