= Zinc Swinging Bridge =

- Zinc Swinging Bridge-BO0162
- U.S. National Register of Historic Places
- Location within Arkansas Location within the United States
- Location: 8039 Washington St., Zinc, Arkansas
- Coordinates: 36°17′5″N 92°54′55″W
- Area: less than one acre
- Built: 1927
- Architectural style: Wire-Cable Suspension Bridge
- NRHP reference No.: 06001286
- Added to NRHP: January 24, 2007

The Zinc Swinging Bridge is a pedestrian suspension bridge spanning Sugar Orchard Creek in the small town of Zinc, Arkansas, United States, that is listed on the National Register of Historic Places.

== Description ==
Located adjacent to Washington Street, the bridge is constructed out of triangular concrete piers, metal cables 1.25 inches (3.2 cm) thick, with wooden planking supported by runner borders bolted to the cables. The bridge is 104 feet (32 m) long, its piers set 60 feet (18 m) apart. At its highest point, the bridge is about 16 feet (4.9 m) above the ground. The bridge is one of a small number of suspension bridges in the state, and one of its most distinctive.

== History ==
The bridge was built in 1927 during the local rebuilding effort following the Great Mississippi Flood of 1927. The bridge was built by miners who were out of work due to the floods, and it replaced an earlier bridge which had been washed out by those floods that year.

The bridge was listed on the National Register of Historic Places on January 24, 2007 (as "Zinc Swinging Bridge-BO0162", reflecting the inclusion of its state cultural survey identifier).

In June 2014, the swinging bridge partially collapsed due to the failure of its mostly shale western pier during repair work that was being done on it due to cracking which had first developed several years prior. Local government and residents endeavored to rebuild it without a grant as they felt that would take too long to be approved, and they needed it in place before heavy spring rainstorms which often render Sugar Orchard Creek impassable. The rebuilt bridge was completed in 2015 and followed the original structural design. The incident did not affect its listing on the NRHP.

== See also ==
- National Register of Historic Places listings in Boone County, Arkansas
- List of bridges on the National Register of Historic Places in Arkansas
