= Bear Creek Motel =

- U.S. National Register of Historic Places
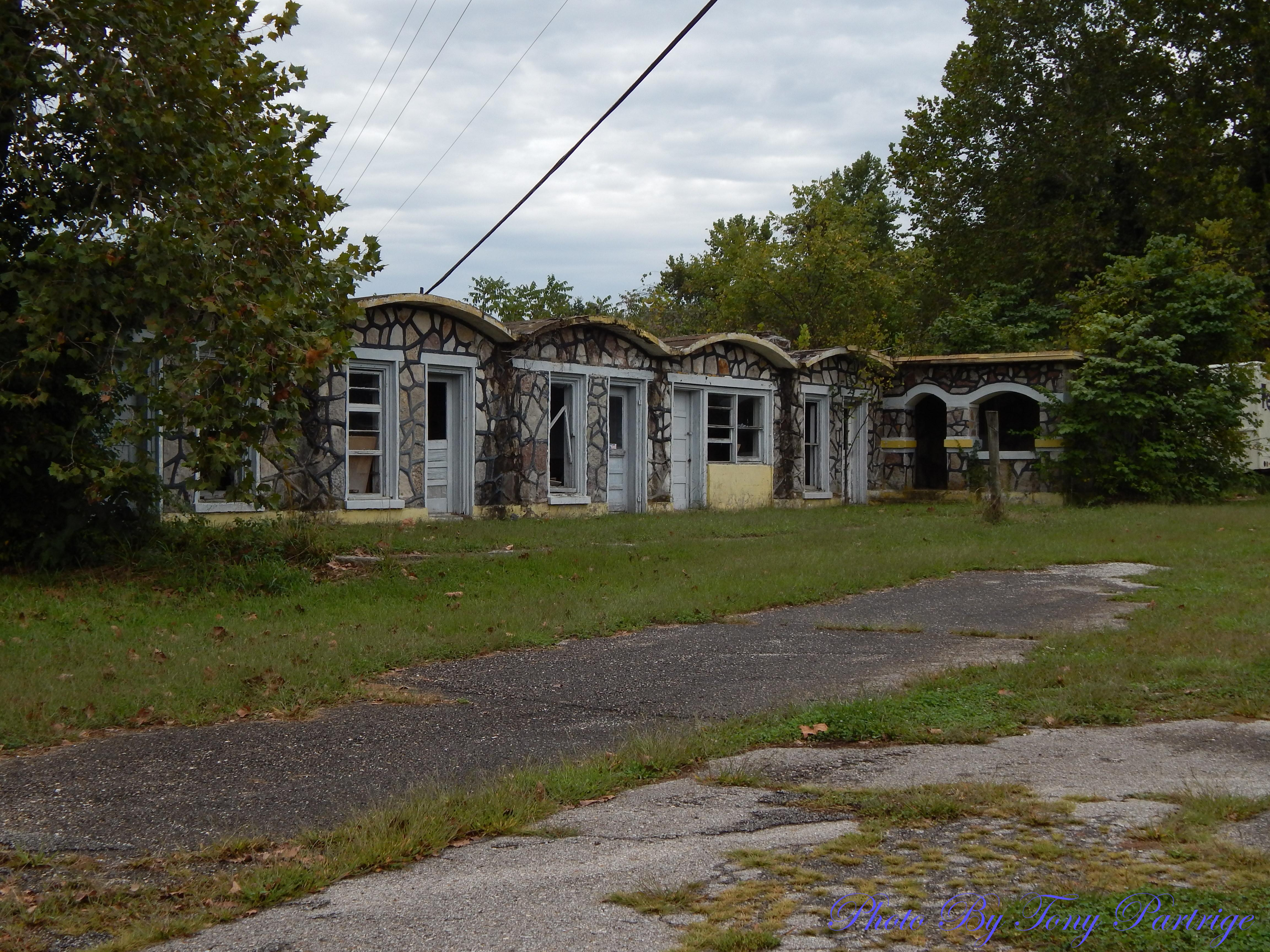

- Location within Arkansas Location within the United States
- Location: US 65, Bear Creek Springs, Arkansas
- Coordinates: 36°17′30″N 93°10′55″W
- Area: less than one acre
- Built: 1936
- Architectural style: Ozark Fieldstone
- MPS: Arkansas Highway History and Architecture MPS
- NRHP reference No.: 01000175
- Added to NRHP: March 13, 2001

The Bear Creek Motel is a historic motel on United States Route 65 in Bear Creek Springs, Arkansas. It is a single T-shaped stone and concrete building, built in 1936 to replace a wood-framed tourist accommodation that had burned down. The building has a distinctive wave-shaped concrete roof, intended to lure travelers off the road, and houses five guest rooms and an office. The wave shape is continued in the guest rooms, which have barrel-vaulted ceilings, and are also finished in concrete and stone veneer.

The property was listed on the National Register of Historic Places in 2001.

== See also ==
- National Register of Historic Places listings in Boone County, Arkansas
