= Carrollton Road-Carrollton Segment =

- U.S. National Register of Historic Places
- Location within Arkansas Location within the United States
- Nearest city: Carrollton, Arkansas
- Area: 16 acres (6.5 ha)
- MPS: Cherokee Trail of Tears MPS
- NRHP reference No.: 08000432
- Added to NRHP: May 20, 2008

The Carrollton Road-Carrollton Segment is a historic 19th-century road in Boone County, Arkansas. It extends for more than 4 miles (6.4 km) eastward from Carrollton, which was once the county seat of Carroll County. The roadways matching the documented 1837 alignment of the road are (from west to east, beginning at U.S. Route 412) County Road 417, Terrapin Creek Road, and Dunkard Road, up to its junction with Green Hill Road. This stretch of dirt road has retained a 19th-century rural character, and is further significant as a route taken by Native American parties on the Trail of Tears in 1838.

The road was listed on the National Register of Historic Places in 2008.

== See also ==
- National Register of Historic Places listings in Boone County, Arkansas
