= Valley Springs, Arkansas =

- Town
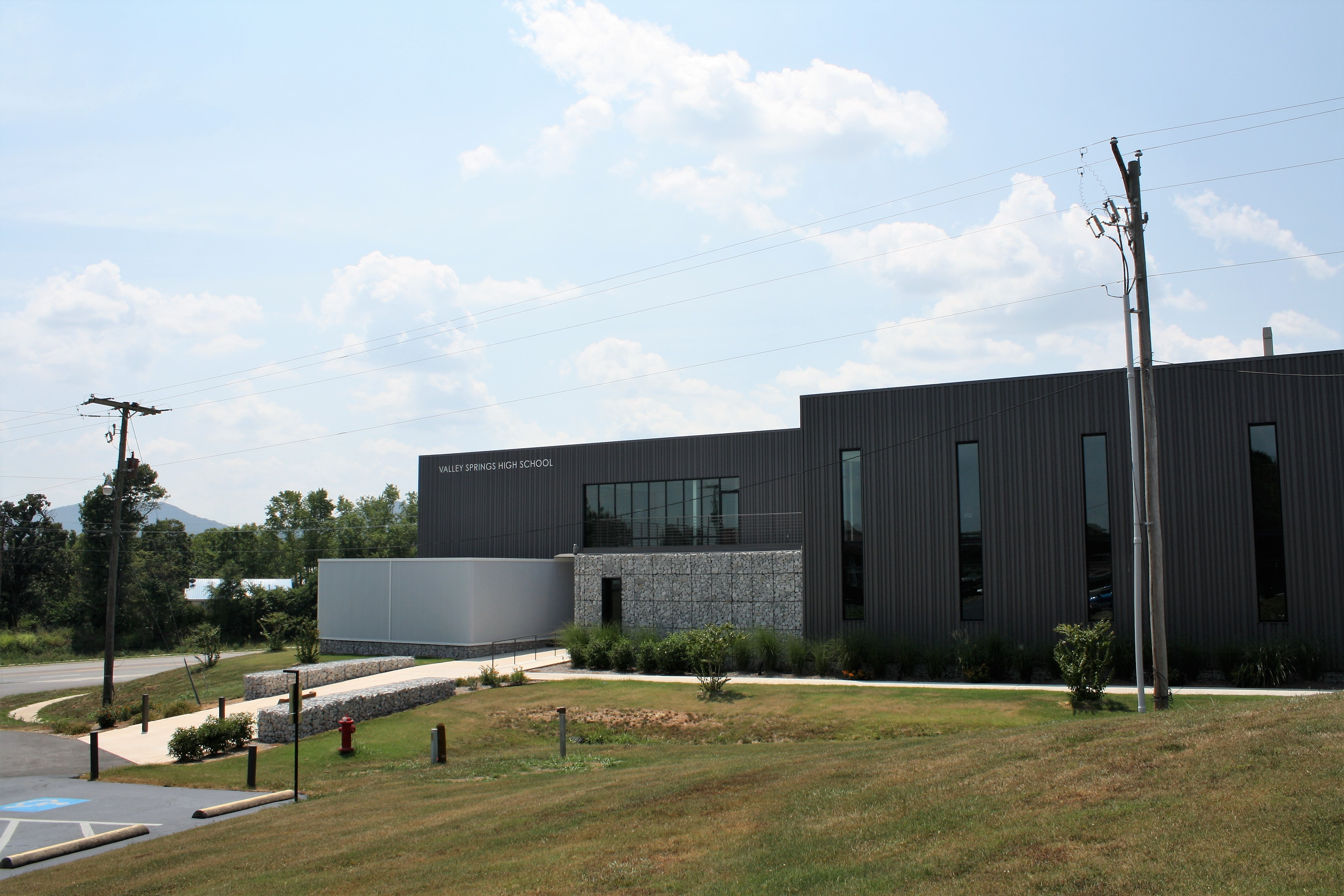
- Valley Springs High School

- Location of Valley Springs in Boone County, Arkansas.
- Coordinates: 36°09′14″N 92°59′23″W
- Country: United States
- State: Arkansas
- County: Boone

Area
  - Total: 0.51 sq mi (1.33 km^{2})
  - Land: 0.51 sq mi (1.33 km^{2})
  - Water: 0 sq mi (0.00 km^{2})
- Elevation: 1,063 ft (324 m)

Population (2020)
  - Total: 183
  - Estimate (2025): 180 ▼
  - Density: 356.2/sq mi (137.54/km^{2})
- Time zone: UTC-6 (Central (CST))
  - Summer (DST): UTC-5 (CDT)
- ZIP code: 72682
- Area code: 870
- FIPS code: 05-71390
- GNIS feature ID: 2406786

Valley Springs is a town in Boone County, Arkansas, United States. The population was 183 at the 2020 census, up from 175 at the 2010 census. It is part of the Harrison Micropolitan Statistical Area.

== History ==
Valley Springs Academy was a private high school in Valley Springs. It was established in 1870. It was supported by the Methodist Episcopal Church.

=== Alumni ===
- Jackson F. Henley, state legislator and judge
- Henry W. Sitton, state legislator

== Geography ==
According to the United States Census Bureau, the town has a total area of 1.2 km^{2} (0.5 mi^{2}), all land.

=== List of highways ===
- U.S. Highway 65
- Arkansas Highway 206

== Demographics ==
Historical population
Census	Pop.	Note	%±
1980	190		—
1990	200		5.3%
2000	167		−16.5%
2010	175		4.8%
2020	183		4.6%
2025 (est.)	180	▼	−1.6%
U.S. Decennial Census

As of the census of 2010, there were 175 people, 69 households, and 54 families residing in the town. The population density was 137.2/km^{2} (352.0/mi^{2}). There were 73 housing units at an average density of 60.0/km^{2} (153.9/mi^{2}). The racial makeup of the town was 95.21% White, 1.20% Native American, 1.20% Asian, 0.60% Pacific Islander, 0.60% from other races, and 1.20% from two or more races. 0.60% of the population were Hispanic or Latino of any race.

There were 66 households, out of which 34.8% had children under the age of 18 living with them, 63.6% were married couples living together, 13.6% had a female householder with no husband present, and 21.2% were non-families. 16.7% of all households were made up of individuals, and 6.1% had someone living alone who was 65 years of age or older. The average household size was 2.53 and the average family size was 2.85.

In the town, the population was spread out, with 28.7% under the age of 18, 5.4% from 18 to 24, 29.3% from 25 to 44, 25.7% from 45 to 64, and 10.8% who were 65 years of age or older. The median age was 36 years. For every 100 females, there were 85.6 males. For every 100 females age 18 and over, there were 83.1 males.

The median income for a household in the town was $27,143, and the median income for a family was $27,321. Males had a median income of $16,136 versus $17,708 for females. The per capita income for the town was $11,614. About 17.6% of families and 18.0% of the population were below the poverty line, including 24.4% of those under the age of eighteen and 10.5% of those 65 or over.

== Education ==
Valley Springs, along with Bellefonte and Everton, is within the Valley Springs School District, which leads to graduation at Valley Springs High School.
