= Zinc, Arkansas =

- Town
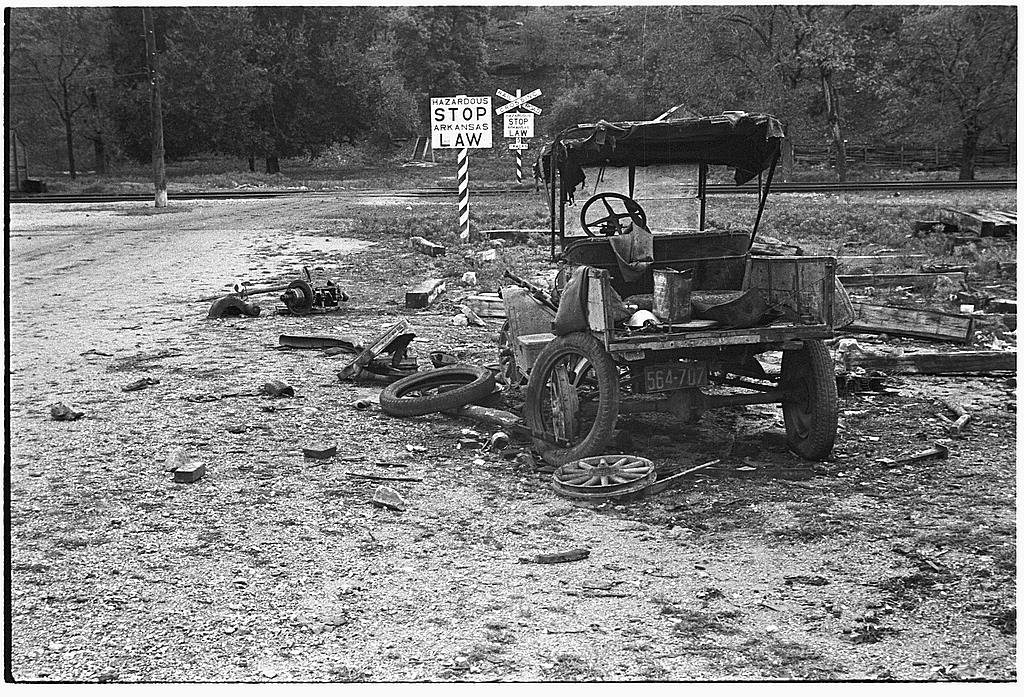
- Zinc, Arkansas, October 1936

- Location of Zinc in Boone County, Arkansas.
- Coordinates: 36°17′01″N 92°54′53″W
- Country: United States
- State: Arkansas
- County: Boone

Area
  - Total: 0.75 sq mi (1.94 km^{2})
  - Land: 0.75 sq mi (1.94 km^{2})
  - Water: 0 sq mi (0.00 km^{2})
- Elevation: 860 ft (260 m)

Population (2020)
  - Total: 92
  - Estimate (2025): 87 ▼
  - Density: 122.6/sq mi (47.32/km^{2})
- Time zone: UTC-6 (Central (CST))
  - Summer (DST): UTC-5 (CDT)
- ZIP code: 72601
- Area code: 870
- FIPS code: 05-77600
- GNIS feature ID: 2406929

Zinc is a town near the east-central edge of Boone County, Arkansas, United States. The population was 92 at the 2020 census. It is part of the Harrison Micropolitan Statistical Area. A chapter of the Ku Klux Klan operates in Zinc.

== History ==
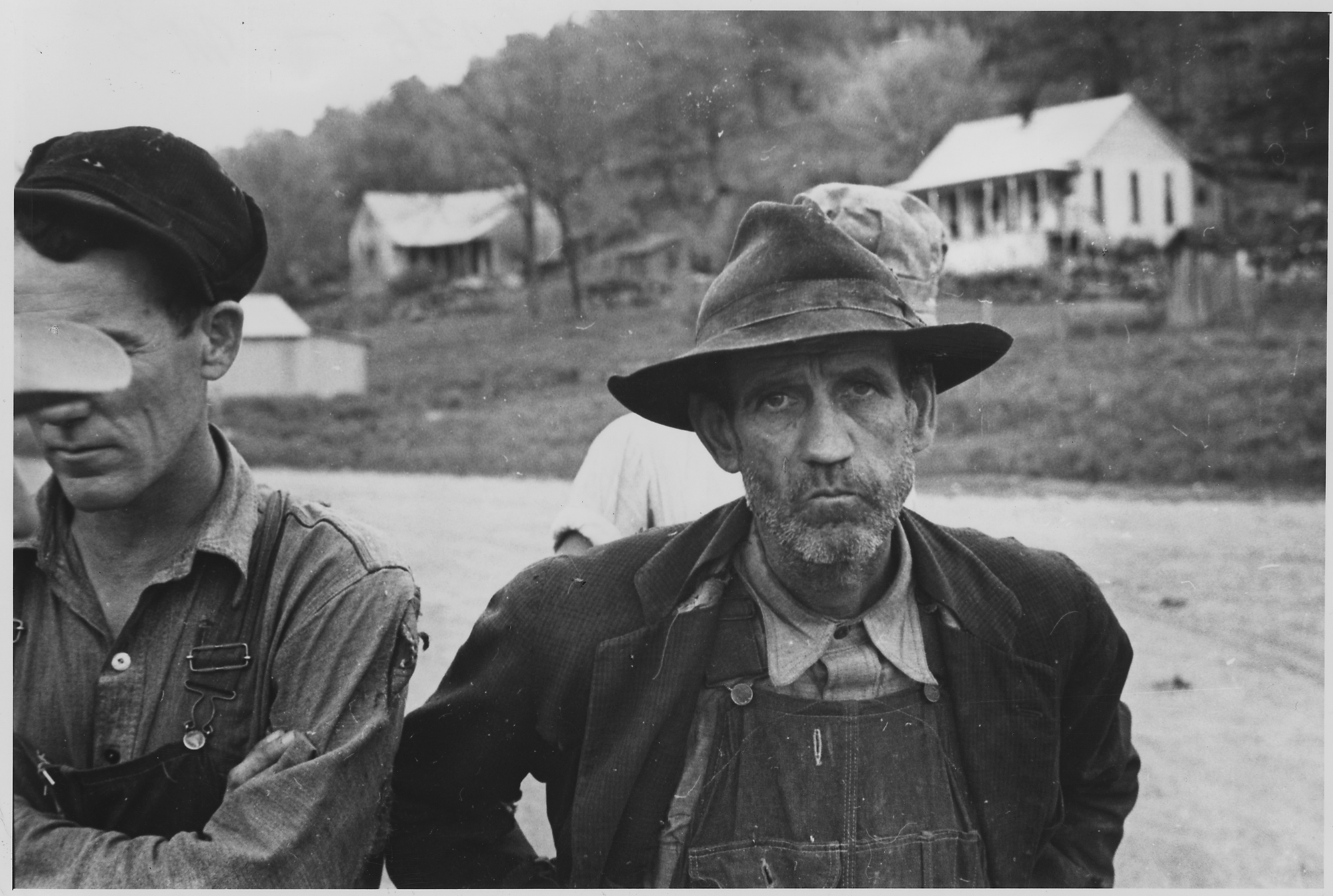
People of Zinc, c. 1935

Zinc mining in the area gave the town its name. Zinc and lead mining began in the 1890s and peaked during World War I (1914–1918). A post office was established in Zinc in 1900 and the town was incorporated in 1904.

The town had a number of business establishments and a school in the 1920s, but a flood in 1927 caused damage to homes and businesses. Zinc's population was 188 in 1930 and declined thereafter. The last store closed in Zinc in the late 1960s and the post office closed in 1975.

Zinc, in the 21st century, became the headquarters of a chapter of the Knights of the Ku Klux Klan (KKK), classified as a hate group by the Anti-Defamation League and the Southern Poverty Law Center. The "Christian Revival Center" near Zinc belongs to a preacher named Thomas Robb who is also the leader of the Knights of the KKK. The center hosts events connected with the KKK, including in 2013 a "Klan Kamp" called the "Soldiers of the Cross Training Institute" to instill "the tools to become actively involved" in the "struggle for our racial redemption".

Other activities of the KKK near Zinc include the placement of signs along highways with messages such as "Diversity is a code for #whitegenocide".

In May 2022, English YouTuber Niko Omilana published a video documenting his experiences in Zinc and Harrison while disguised as a journalist for the BBC. The video includes an interview with Thomas Robb, where he unwittingly shouts out fake Instagram users whose names phoneticize phrases such as "BLM".

== National Historic Sites ==
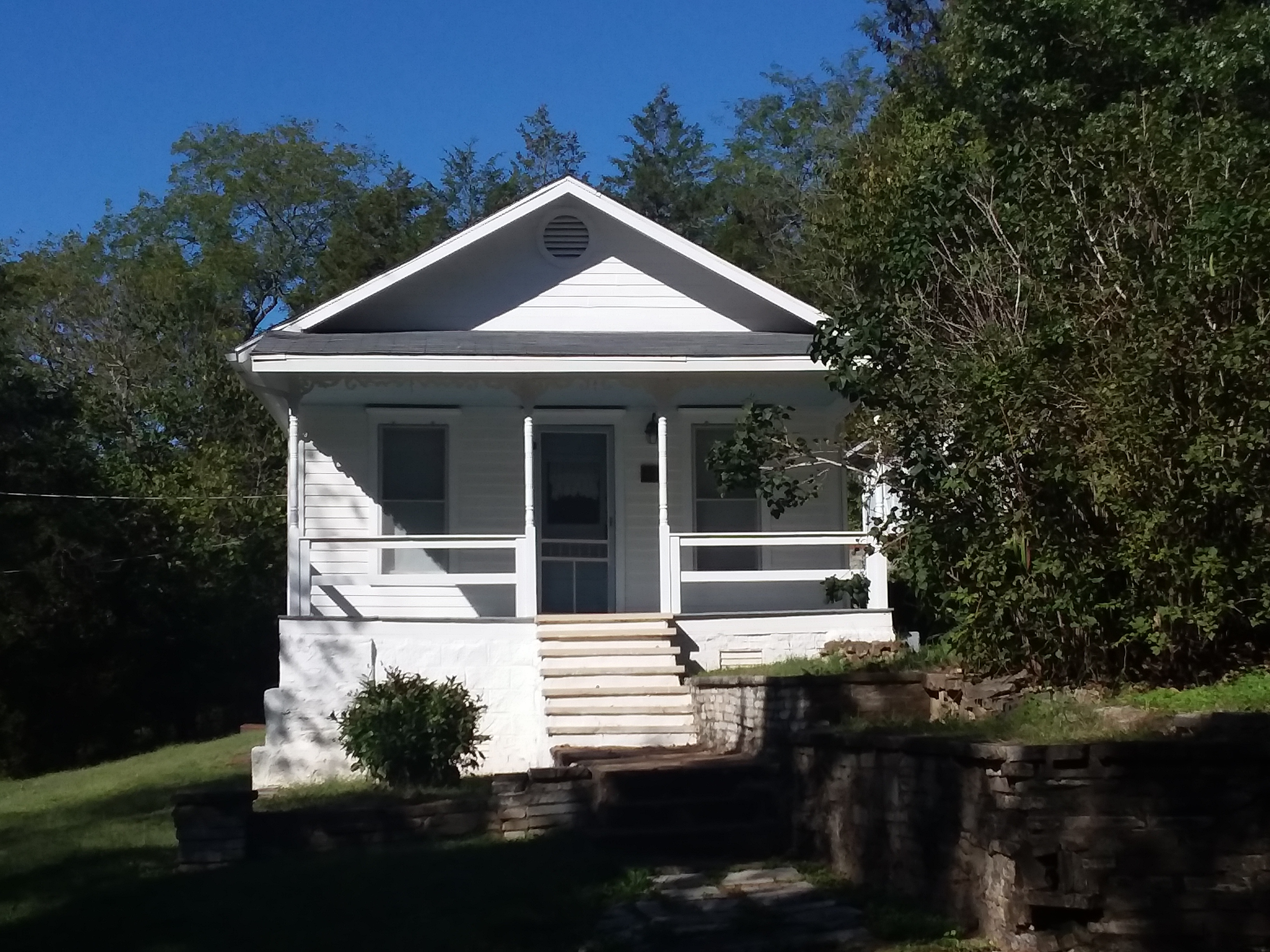
The Elliott and Anna Barham House, a historic residence in Zinc, Arkansas, September 2018

Two National Historic Sites are located in the town: the Elliott and Anna Barham House and the Zinc Swinging Bridge.

== Geography ==
Zinc is located at 36°17′7″N 92°54′56″W (36.285384, −92.915419), approximately nine miles east in straight-line distance from the county seat of Harrison. According to the United States Census Bureau, the town has a total area of 0.752 square miles (1.95 km^{2}), of which 0.751 square miles (1.95 km^{2}) is land and 0.001 square miles (0.0026 km^{2}) is water.

Zinc is in the Ozark region and has an elevation of 879 feet (268 m).

Historical population
Census	Pop.	Note	%±
1910	173		—
1920	144		−16.8%
1930	188		30.6%
1940	119		−36.7%
1950	99		−16.8%
1960	68		−31.3%
1970	58		−14.7%
1980	113		94.8%
1990	91		−19.5%
2000	76		−16.5%
2010	103		35.5%
2020	92		−10.7%
2025 (est.)	87	▼	−5.4%
U.S. Decennial Census

== Demographics ==
=== Racial and ethnic composition ===
Zinc, Arkansas – racial and ethnic composition Note: the US Census treats Hispanic/Latino as an ethnic category. This table excludes Latinos from the racial categories and assigns them to a separate category. Hispanics/Latinos may be of any race.
Race / ethnicity (NH = Non-Hispanic)	Pop 2000	Pop 2010	Pop 2020	% 2000	% 2010	% 2020
White alone (NH)	72	91	88	94.74%	88.35%	95.65%
Black or African American alone (NH)	0	1	1	0.00%	0.97%	1.09%
Native American or Alaska Native alone (NH)	1	0	0	1.32%	0.00%	0.00%
Asian alone (NH)	0	0	0	0.00%	0.00%	0.00%
Native Hawaiian or Pacific Islander alone (NH)	0	0	0	0.00%	0.00%	0.00%
Other race alone (NH)	0	0	0	0.00%	0.00%	0.00%
Mixed-race or multiracial (NH)	1	9	3	1.32%	8.74%	3.26%
Hispanic or Latino (any race)	2	2	0	2.63%	1.94%	0.00%
Total	76	103	92	100.00%	100.00%	100.00%

As of the census of 2010, there were 103 people, 37 households, and 23 families residing in the town. The population density was 39.1 people/km^{2} (101 people/mi^{2}). There were 35 housing units at an average density of 18.0 units/km^{2} (47 units/mi^{2}). The racial makeup of the town was 88.3% White, 1% Black or African American, and 8.7% from two or more races. 1.9% of the population were Hispanic or Latino of any race.

There were 37 households, out of which 64.5% had children under the age of 18 living with them, 45.2% were married couples living together, 16.1% had a female householder with no husband present, and 22.6% were non-families. 19.4% of all households were made up of individuals, and 3.2% had someone living alone who was 65 years of age or older. The average household size was 2.45 and the average family size was 2.79.

In the town, the population was spread out, with 18.4% under the age of 18, 6.6% from 18 to 24, 25.0% from 25 to 44, 38.2% from 45 to 64, and 11.8% who were 65 years of age or older. The median age was 45 years. For every 100 females, there were 145.2 males. For every 100 females age 18 and over, there were 148.0 males.

The median income for a household in the town was $20,036, and the median income for a family was $18,250. Males had a median income of $10,194 versus $5,250 for females. The per capita income for the town was $9,999. There were 35.8% of families and 25.9% of the population living below the poverty line, including 43.0% of those under 18 and 63.7% of those over 65.

Zinc, along with Bergman, is within the Bergman School District.

== In popular culture ==
In 2022, American YouTuber Poudii came to Zinc to investigate claims that "Zinc is the most racist town in America". In his first visit, Poudii met and interviewed Tom Bowie, white nationalist and commentator on the Neo-Nazi website Stormfront. Clips of this interview gained fame both on YouTube and TikTok with comments raving about the meeting between the two. Poudii returned to Zinc twice, and the larger neighboring town of Harrison to interview more residents.

== See also ==
- List of towns in Arkansas
- List of sundown towns in the United States
