= Bear Creek Springs, Arkansas =

Unincorporated community in Arkansas, US

Coordinates: 36°17′51″N 93°11′00″W

Bear Creek Springs is an unincorporated community in Boone County, Arkansas, United States. It is the location of (or is the nearest community to) Bear Creek Motel, which is located on U.S. 65 and is listed on the National Register of Historic Places.

== Major highways ==
- US 62
- US 65
- US 412

== History ==
In the nineteenth century or earlier, there was a Shawnee village called Shawneetown located along the banks of Bear Creek. The exact location was not known.

Prior to having the name Bear Creek Springs, the area had a post office called Francis. It is unknown why that name was used.

In the years before the Civil War, a community existed in the area due to clean water and a great deal of game. It also served as a stopping place for settlers to camp as they headed west.

Bear Creek Springs was once an incorporated town. However, as the city of Harrison developed and better transportation options became available, residents and businesses left. Bear Creek Springs is now an unincorporated community with a small handful of businesses remaining along what is now US 65.
