= Missouri and North Arkansas Railroad =

American railway

Overview
- Headquarters: Harrison, AR
- Reporting mark: M&NA
- Locale: Midwestern United States
- Dates of operation: August 6, 1906–1946
- Predecessor: St. Louis and North Arkansas Railway
- Successor: Arkansas and Ozarks Railway

Technical
- Track gauge: 4 ft 8 1/2 in (1,435 mm) standard gauge
- Length: 335.21 miles (539.47 km) in 1919

The Missouri and North Arkansas (reporting mark M&NA) was a railroad in Missouri and Arkansas from 1906 to 1935, with its successor lasting until 1946.

== History ==
The railroad began as the Eureka Springs Railway in 1883 as a line from the St. Louis–San Francisco Railway ("Frisco") in Seligman, MO, reaching the resort town of Eureka Springs, AR in 1883. In May 1899, the line was conveyed to a newly-formed company, the St. Louis and North Arkansas Railroad, which intended to build all the way to Little Rock. The railroad was extended east, reaching Harrison, AR in 1901, and included a branch into Berryville, AR. Leslie, AR was reached in 1903.

The railway was reorganized as the M&NA in 1906. It continued to expand, and while never reaching Little Rock, it arrived in Kensett, AR in 1908, and Helena, AR in 1909. In 1908, the railroad extended northwest from Seligman 9.6 miles via trackage rights on the Frisco line to the whistle stop of Wayne, Missouri. From there, a new 31 mile section was constructed to Neosho, MO, the northern terminus of the M&NA tracks.

The failure of the railroad to terminate in or serve a large city along its route or connect to a transportation hub, would always limit its profitability and leave it vunerable to long labor actions and post-war downturns in freight, shipping and passengers. The observation of a chronicler of the railroad's history was that it, "started nowhere, went nowhere and ended nowhere."

Along this section, several communities were established by the railroad to generate revenue from passenger and small scale freight service: Monark Springs, Aroma, Stark City, Fairview, Wheaton, and Ridgley.

From Neosho, the railroad continued trackage rights via the Kansas City Southern Railway ("KCS") to Joplin, MO and Joplin Union Depot. There, connections with the Missouri-Kansas-Texas Railroad (KATY) and Kansas City Southern provided access to Kansas City, Texas, Oklahoma, Kansas and several Gulf ports.

In August 1914, a steam locomotive owned by the KCS collided with a M&NA doodlebug (a gasoline powered, self-propelled rail passenger car), killing thirty-eight passengers and five crew members. In March 1918, the Arkansas Supreme Court ruled that the KCS and MN&A should share liability and pay their own costs.

The Missouri and Arkansas Railway was created in April 1935 to take over the M&NA property. However, operations were discontinued by that company in September 1946 due to a rail strike and a severe drop of freight with the end of World War II. Most of the line was abandoned that year, with much of it salvaged by April 1949. But several segments were reactivated. The Seligman-to-Harrison portion was operated by the Arkansas and Ozarks Railway between February 1950 and May, 1960. The Helena-to-Cotton Plant portion was operated by the Helena and Northwestern Railway between October 1949 and November 1951. Finally, the Cotton Plant-Fargo Railway operated between those two locations from April 1952 into the 1970s.

About 2.5 miles of the line around Eureka Springs continues to be operated by the Eureka Springs and North Arkansas Railway.

== See also ==
- Bellefonte station
