= Henry Sitton =

Oklahoma politician

Henry W. Sitton was a politician in Oklahoma who served a term in the Oklahoma House of Representatives starting in 1915.

He was a Democrat who lived in Duncan, Oklahoma.
