= Self, Arkansas =

Unincorporated community in Arkansas, US

Coordinates: 36°23′53″N 93°06′30″W

Self is an unincorporated community in Boone County, Arkansas, United States. It is the location of (or is the nearest community to) Cottonwood School No. 45, which is located at Cottonwood and Dubuque Roads and is listed on the National Register of Historic Places.

The community was named after John Self, a first settler.
