= Valley Springs High School =

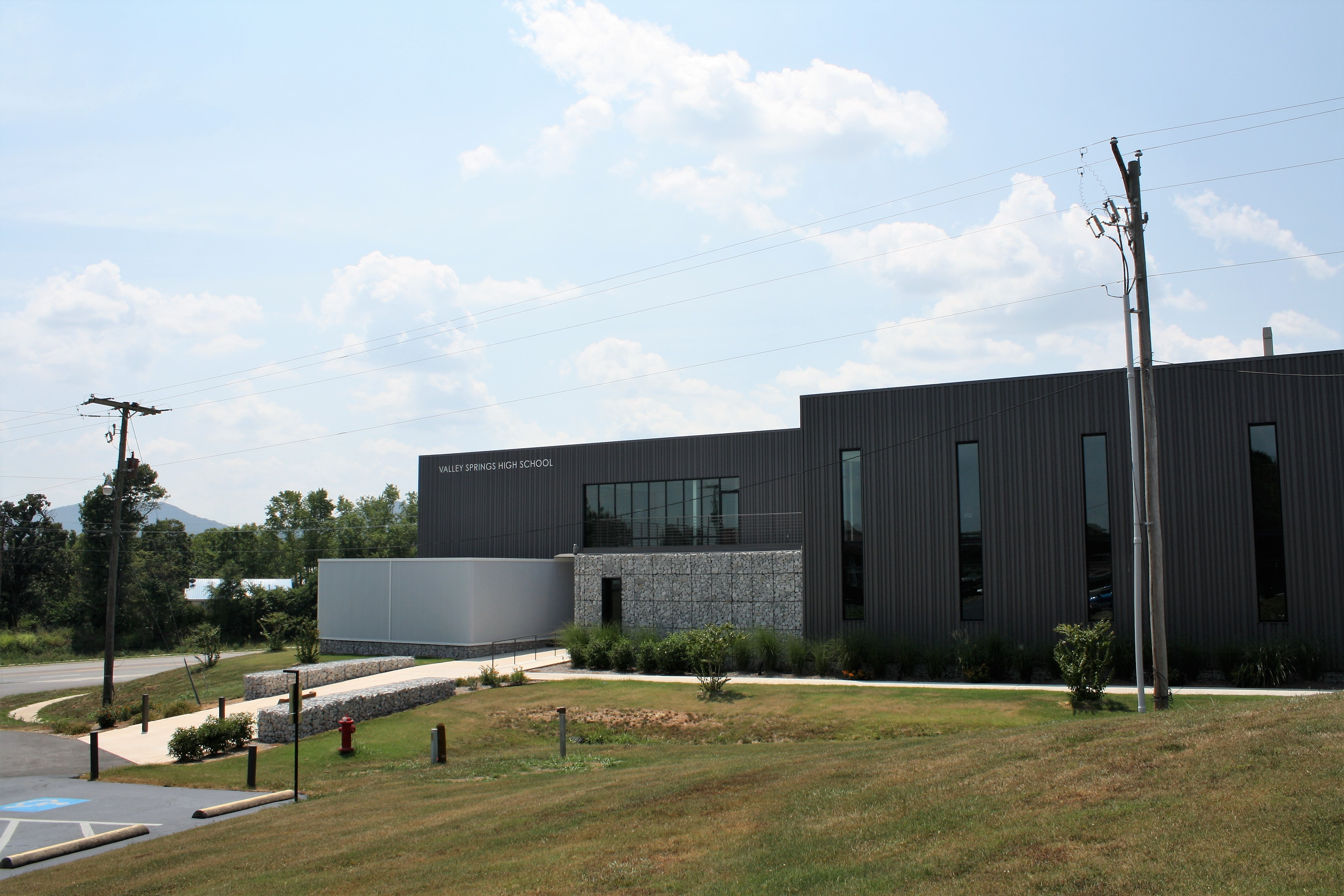

Location
- 7349 School Street; Valley Springs, Arkansas 72682; United States; 36°9′28″N 92°59′37″W

Information
- Type: Public secondary
- Established: 1912 (114 years ago)
- School district: Valley Springs
- NCES District ID: 0513350
- CEEB code: 042495
- NCES School ID: 051335001093
- Principal: Angie Bogle
- Faculty: 53.68 (on FTE basis)
- Grades: 9 to 12
- Colors: Green and white
- Athletics: Basketball, Golf, E-sports, Baseball Etc.
- Mascot: Tiger
- USNWR ranking: 6 (AR); 1072 (USA)
- Website: www.valley.k12.ar.us/page/high-school

Valley Springs High School is a secondary school in Valley Springs, Arkansas, United States. The school is the sole high school serving grades 9 through 12 in the Valley Springs School District. In 2012, Valley Springs was nationally recognized with the Silver Award in the U.S. News & World Report Best High Schools ranking report.

== History ==
In 1912, the North Arkansas Conference of Methodist Churches felt a need to establish a high school in the Ozarks. Valley Springs, with its academic background, was selected, and it became Valley Springs Training School.

In 1922, the first organized high school was started in an old two-story frame structure on the south hill at Valley Springs. For a dormitory, the school used the old Dr. Hale home above the spring. The church bought a 12-acre (49,000 m^{2}) campus and a farm of 160 acres (0.65 km^{2}) on which the boys worked to help pay expenses. Part of this farm is now the present school system.

== Academics ==
The assumed course of study follows the Smart Core curriculum developed by the Arkansas Department of Education (ADE). Students complete regular (core) and career focus courses and exams and may select Advanced Placement (AP) coursework and exams that provide an opportunity for students to obtain college credit.

== Athletics ==
The Valley Springs High School mascot and athletic emblem is the tiger with green and white serving as its school colors.

For 2012–14, the Valley Springs Tigers compete in the 3A 1 East (Basketball) Conference under the administration of the Arkansas Activities Association (AAA). Interscholastic activities include baseball, basketball (boys/girls), cheer, cross country (boys/girls), golf (boys/girls), softball, tennis (boys/girls), track (boys/girls), and volleyball.

The Valley Springs Tigers boys basketball team has been one of the state's most successful with six state championships between 1950 and 1996, including three consecutive titles in 1950–52.

== Notable alumni ==
- James Dickey - collegiate basketball coach
- Tim Sherrill - Former MLB Player (St. Louis Cardinals)
