= Everton, Arkansas =

- Town
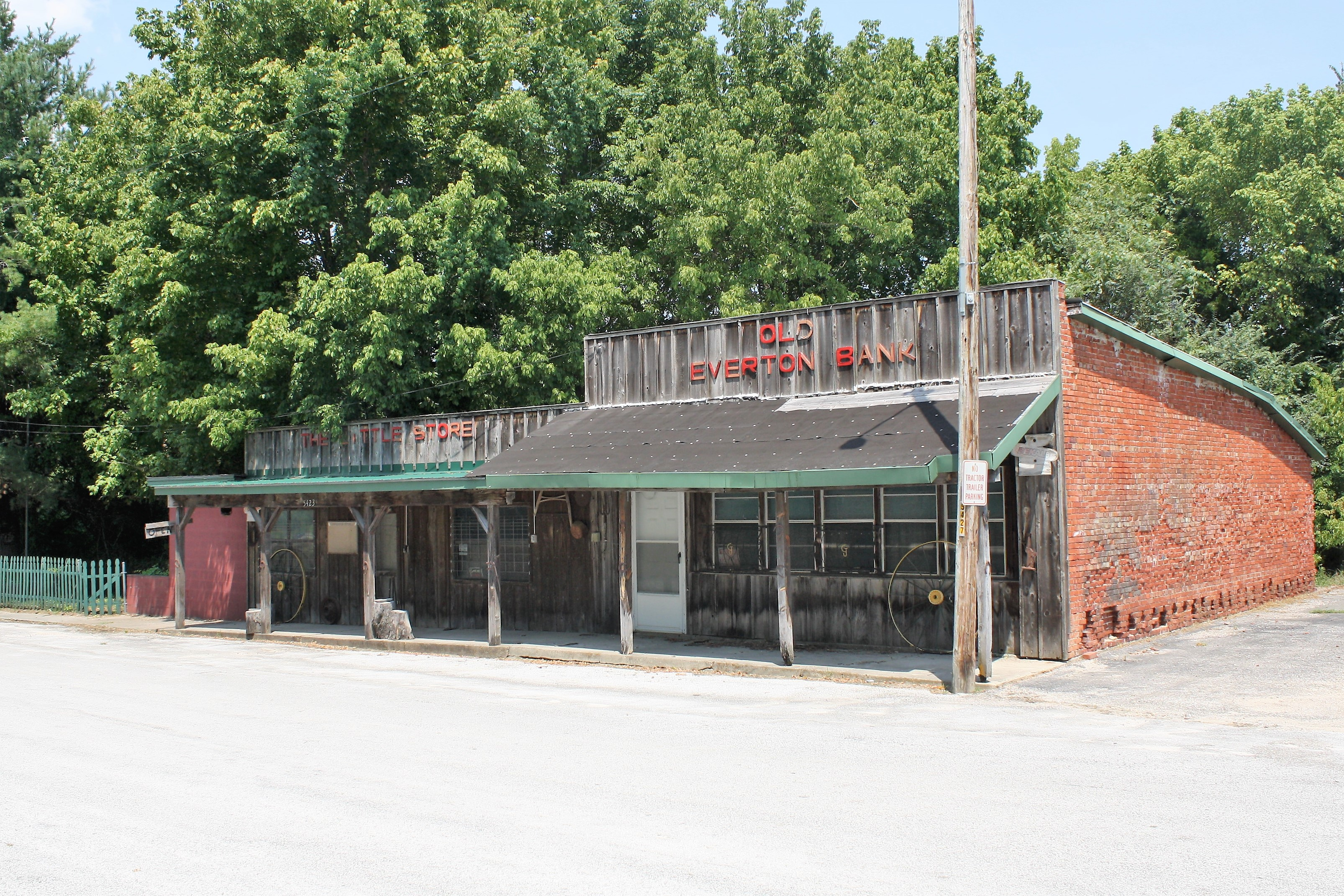
- Downtown Everton

- Location of Everton in Boone County, Arkansas.
- Coordinates: 36°09′15″N 92°54′34″W
- Country: United States
- State: Arkansas
- County: Boone

Area
  - Total: 0.47 sq mi (1.23 km^{2})
  - Land: 0.47 sq mi (1.23 km^{2})
  - Water: 0 sq mi (0.00 km^{2})
- Elevation: 938 ft (286 m)

Population (2020)
  - Total: 104
  - Estimate (2025): 105 ▲
  - Density: 219.7/sq mi (84.82/km^{2})
- Time zone: UTC-6 (Central (CST))
  - Summer (DST): UTC-5 (CDT)
- ZIP code: 72633
- Area code: 870
- FIPS code: 05-22450
- GNIS feature ID: 2406475

Everton is a town in Boone County, Arkansas, United States. The population was 104 at the 2020 census. It is part of the Harrison Micropolitan Statistical Area.

== Geography ==
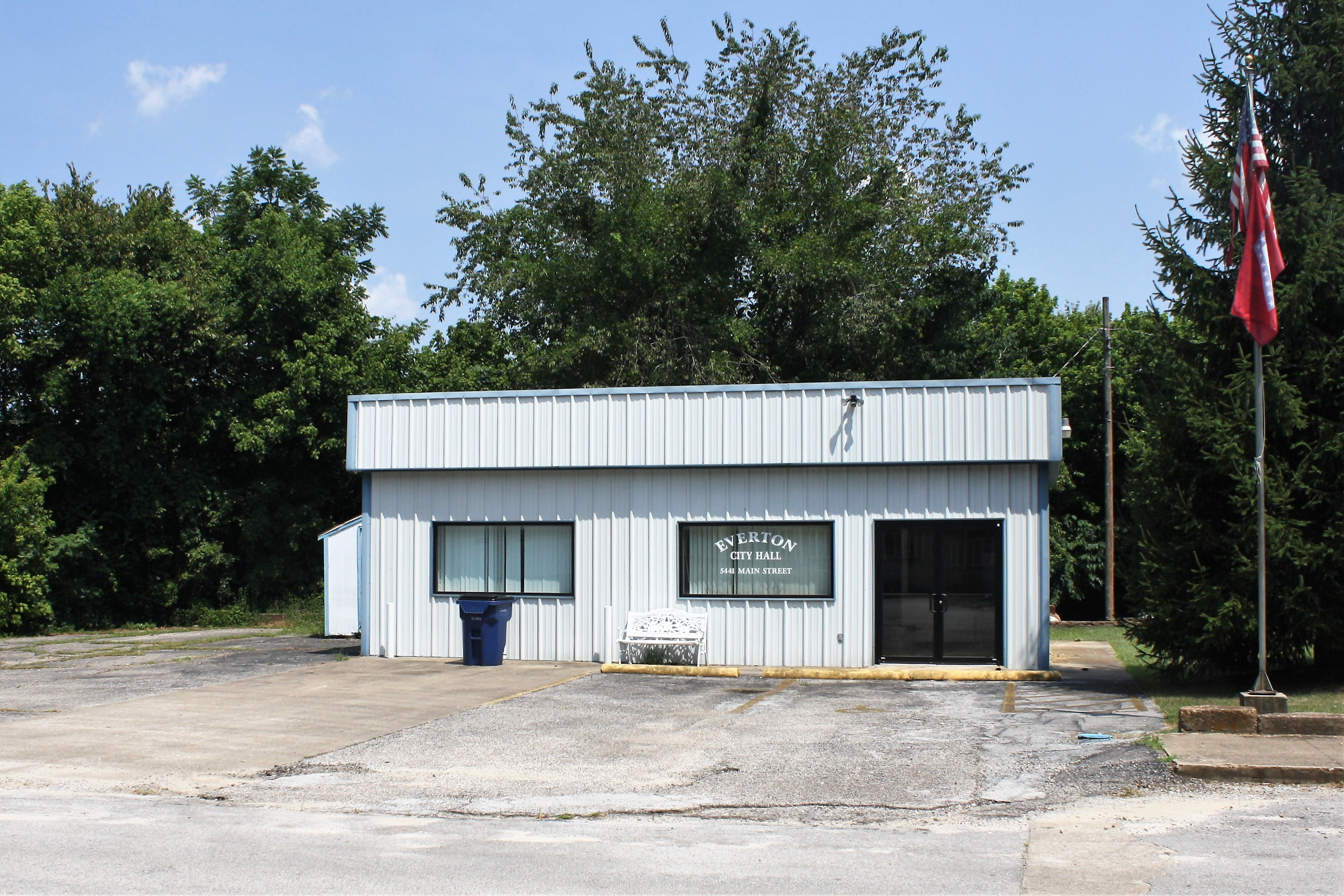
City hall

According to the United States Census Bureau, the town has a total area of 1.2 km^{2} (0.46 sq mi), all land.

=== List of highways ===
- Arkansas Highway 206

== Demographics ==
Historical population
Census	Pop.	Note	%±
1930	180		—
1940	190		5.6%
1950	198		4.2%
1960	118		−40.4%
1970	124		5.1%
1980	134		8.1%
1990	150		11.9%
2000	170		13.3%
2010	133		−21.8%
2020	104		−21.8%
2025 (est.)	105	▲	1.0%
U.S. Decennial Census; 2014 Estimate

As of the census of 2010, there were 170 people, 70 households, and 49 families residing in the town. The population density was 139.7 people/km^{2} (362 people/mi^{2}). There were 73 housing units at an average density of 60.0 units/km^{2} (155 units/mi^{2}). The racial makeup of the town was 97.65% White, 0.59% Native American, 0.59% Asian, and 1.18% from two or more races. 3.53% of the population were Hispanic or Latino of any race.

There were 70 households, out of which 30.0% had children under the age of 18 living with them, 54.3% were married couples living together, 10.0% had a female householder with no husband present, and 30.0% were non-families. 27.1% of all households were made up of individuals, and 12.9% had someone living alone who was 65 years of age or older. The average household size was 2.43 and the average family size was 2.88.

In the town, the population was spread out, with 25.3% under the age of 18, 8.2% from 18 to 24, 33.5% from 25 to 44, 16.5% from 45 to 64, and 16.5% who were 65 years of age or older. The median age was 36 years. For every 100 females, there were 82.8 males. For every 100 females age 18 and over, there were 89.6 males.

The median income for a household in the town was $18,438, and the median income for a family was $27,292. Males had a median income of $25,625 versus $15,313 for females. The per capita income for the town was $14,274. About 16.3% of families and 20.3% of the population were below the poverty line, including 26.1% of those under the age of eighteen and 25.0% of those 65 or over.

== Education ==
The municipal limits are within the Valley Springs School District, which operates Valley Springs Elementary School, Valley Springs Middle School, and Valley Springs High School.

Bruno-Pyatt Elementary School in Eros, of the Ozark Mountain School District, has an Everton postal address, though it is not in the Everton municipal limits, and the school district does not cover any portion of the municipality of Everton. Bruno-Pyatt School had a middle-high school component until 2023. Since 2023 the high school for that district is Ozark Mountain High School, in the former Western Grove High School.
