= Arkansas Highway 164 =

Highway in Arkansas

Highway 164
- AR 164 highlighted in red; AR 164S highlighted in blue

Route information
- Maintained by ArDOT
- Existed: c. 1945–present

Section 1
- Length: 13.289 mi (21.387 km)
- West end: US 64 in Coal Hill
- East end: AR 103

Section 2
- Length: 13.127 mi (21.126 km)
- West end: AR 21 in Clarksville
- East end: AR 7

Section 3
- Length: 1.793 mi (2.886 km)
- West end: AR 27 at Scottsville
- East end: FR 1001 / Broomfield Road

Section 4
- Length: 9.814 mi (15.794 km)
- West end: AR 7 in Dover
- East end: AR 105 at Oak Grove

Location
- Country: United States
- State: Arkansas
- Counties: Johnson, Pope

Highway system
- Arkansas Highway System; Interstate; US; State; Business; Spurs; Suffixed; Scenic; Heritage
← AR 163	→ US 165

Highway 164 (AR 164, Ark. 164, and Hwy. 164) is a designation for four segments of state highway in the Arkansas River Valley. Each are low-volume local roads providing connectivity to small communities, or recreation areas near the Ozark National Forest. The first segment was created in 1945, with the remaining segments created during the late 1950s and 1960s, a period of major Arkansas Highway System expansion. A single spur route provides access to an industrial area in Clarksville. All routes are maintained by the Arkansas Department of Transportation (ArDOT).

== Route description ==
ArDOT maintains the four segments of AR 164 as part of the state highway system. Excluding concurrencies, no section of AR 164 exceeded 1,000 vehicles per day on average in 2020, with a low of 400 VPD between Hagarville and Bullfrog Valley. For reference, roads under 400 VPD are classified as "very low volume local road" by the American Association of State Highway and Transportation Officials (AASHTO).

No segment of AR 164 is part of the National Highway System (NHS), a network of roads important to the nation's economy, defense, and mobility.

=== Coal Hill to Highway 103 ===
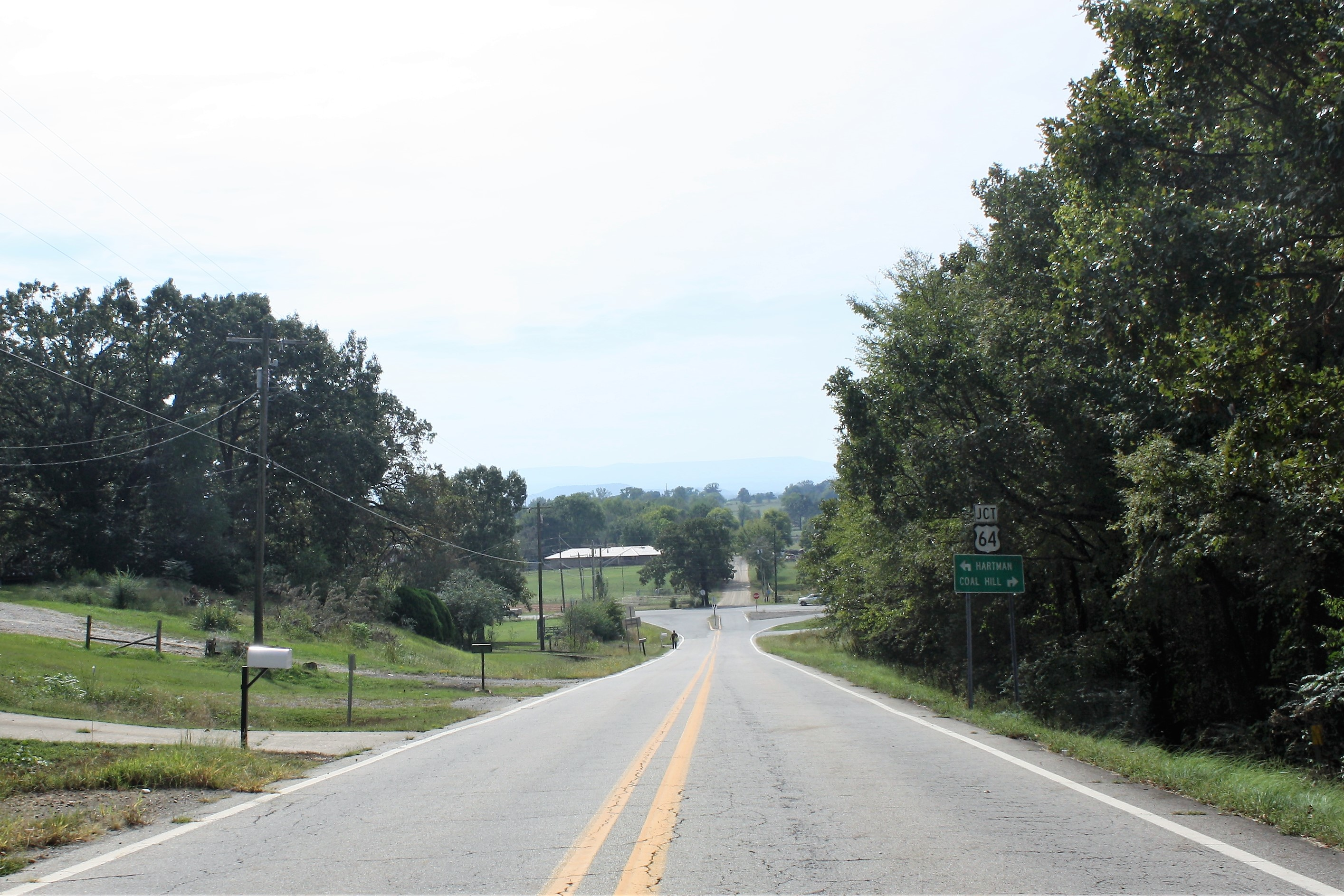
AR 164 southern terminus at US 64 in Coal Hill. Mount Magazine can be seen in the background

Highway 164 begins at US 64 in Coal Hill, a small town within the Arkansas River Valley region approximately 2.5 miles (4.0 km) north of the Arkansas River. The highway runs due north as a section line road and is signed as a north-south highway, despite Arkansas assigning even route numbers to east-west highways. AR 164 passes Westside High School before exiting the city on a winding northward alignment. At an unincorporated area known as Center Point, AR 164 intersects Interstate 40 (I-40) at a partial cloverleaf interchange. North of this junction, AR 164 has a brief concurrency with AR 352 before passing the Horsehead Lake Recreation Area and curving eastward near the southern boundary of the Ozark National Forest. Now signed as an east-west highway, AR 164 continues east to a junction with AR 103 near Harmony, where it terminates.

=== Clarksville to Highway 7 ===
A second segment of AR 164 begins along the northern city limits of Clarksville, the county seat of Johnson County. Beginning at a junction with AR 21 (Ludwig Road), AR 164 runs east as Airport Road, serving as the northern terminus of Highway 164 Spur (AR 164S, Scoggins Road) and running along the north edge of the Clarksville Municipal Airport. North of Lamar, AR 164 begins a concurrency with AR 123 north to Hagarville. After the concurrency ends, AR 164 continues into Pope County.

AR 164 passes through the unincorporated area known as Bullfrog Valley just south of the Ozark National Forest and Piney Creeks Wildlife Management Area (WMA) boundaries before turning south and crossing Big Piney Creek. The highway winds south to a junction with AR 7, where it terminates approximately 5 miles (8.0 km) north of Dover.

=== Highway 27 to Ozark National Forest ===
A third segment of AR 164 begins at AR 27 northeast of Dover at the unincorporated community of Scottsville in central Pope County. The route runs north across Illinois Bayou to a rural intersection with Broomfield Road, a county road, just south of the Ozark National Forest boundary. The roadway continues north as Forest Service Road 1001 (FR 1001).

=== Dover to Oak Grove ===
The fourth segment of AR 164 begins in downtown Dover at AR 7 (Market Street). AR 164 begins due east as Water Street, curves south around three churches, and exits the city heading east. AR 164 runs east through rural Pope County to Moreland, where it intersects AR 124. Continuing east, AR 164 intersects AR 105 at Oak Grove, where it terminates.

== History ==
The first designation of AR 164 appeared on the 1945 state highway map north of Clarksville between AR 21 and AR 123. The Arkansas General Assembly passed the Act 148 of 1957, the Milum Road Act, creating 10–12 miles (16–19 km) of new state highways in each county. In response to the act, the Arkansas State Highway Commission extended the designation east to AR 7, and created a second segment of AR 164 between AR 103 and Horsehead Lake on July 10, 1957. Two new AR 164 segments were created during another system expansion on April 24, 1963; between AR 27 in Dover and AR 105 and north from Scottsville. The following year, AR 164 was rerouted in Dover along Water Street on January 15, 1964 to avoid expensive bridge construction needed to raise Maple Street to state highway standards, thus changing the western terminus from AR 27 to AR 7.

On February 28, 1968, a fifth segment of AR 164 was created between Coal Hill and I-40 as part of an addition of state highways between US Routes used for interstate travel and the newly completed Interstate highways. The gap between I-40 and Horsehead Lake was closed on December 13, 1972, yielding the four segments in existence today. The Scottsville segment was extended north to the current junction on May 23, 1973 pursuant to Act 9 of 1973, which directed county judges and legislators to designate up to 12 miles (19 km) of county roads as state highways in each county.

== Major intersections ==
Mile markers reset at some concurrencies.

County	Location	mi	km	Destinations	Notes
Johnson	Coal Hill	0.000	0.000	US 64 – Ozark, Clarksville	Western terminus
Johnson	Center Point	4.37	7.03	I-40 – Clarksville, Fort Smith	
Johnson		5.54– 5.67	8.92– 9.12	AR 352 – Clarksville, Mountain Grove	
Johnson		13.289	21.387	AR 103 – Clarksville	Eastern terminus
Johnson	Gap in route				
Johnson	Clarksville	0.000	0.000	AR 21 (Ludwig Road)	Western terminus
Johnson	Clarksville	0.10	0.16	AR 164S south (Scoggins Street)	AR 164S northern terminus
Johnson		3.414– 0.000	5.494– 0.000	AR 123 – Hagarville, Sand Gap	Southern end of AR 123 concurrency
Johnson	See AR 123				
Johnson	Hagarville	0.000	0.000	AR 123 – Fort Douglas	Northern end of AR 123 concurrency
Pope		9.14	14.71	Bridge over Big Piney Creek	
Pope		13.127	21.126	AR 7 – Dover, Jasper	Eastern terminus
Pope	Gap in route				
Pope	Scottsville	0.000	0.000	AR 27 – Dover, Hector	Western terminus
Pope		1.793	2.886	FR 1001 / Broomfield Road	Eastern terminus
Pope	Gap in route				
Pope	Dover	0.000	0.000	AR 7 (Market Street)	Western terminus
Pope	Moreland	7.36	11.84	AR 124 – Russellville, Jerusalem	
Pope	Oak Grove	9.814	15.794	AR 105 – Atkins, Hector	Eastern terminus
1.000 mi = 1.609 km; 1.000 km = 0.621 mi

== Clarksville spur ==
Scoggins Street
- Location: Clarksville
- Length: 0.142 mi (229 m)
- Existed: September 17, 1980–present

Highway 164 Spur (AR 164S, Ark. 164S, and Hwy. 164S) is a spur route in Clarksville. It is known as Scoggins Street and serves an industrial area near Clarksville Municipal Airport. The highway was created on September 17, 1980. In 2019, the highway saw 100 vehicles per day on average, with 16% being trucks.

Major intersections

The entire route is in Clarksville, Johnson County.

mi	km	Destinations	Notes
0.000	0.000	AR 164 (Airport Road)	Northern terminus
0.142	0.229	End state maintenance	Southern terminus
1.000 mi = 1.609 km; 1.000 km = 0.621 mi
