= Arkansas Highway 21 =

State highway in Arkansas, United States

Highway 21

Route information
- Maintained by ArDOT
- Length: 99.14 mi (159.55 km)
- Existed: 1926–present

Major junctions
- South end: US 64 in Clarksville
- AR 16 from Fallsville to Edwards Junction; US 412 near Marble; US 62 / AR 221 in Berryville
- North end: Route 13 at the Missouri state line in Blue Eye

Location
- Country: United States
- State: Arkansas
- Counties: Johnson, Newton, Madison, Carroll

Highway system
- Arkansas Highway System; Interstate; US; State; Business; Spurs; Suffixed; Scenic; Heritage
← AR 20	→ AR 22

Arkansas Highway 21 (AR 21) is a north–south state highway in north central Arkansas, in the United States. The route runs 99.14 miles (159.55 km) from U.S. Route 64 (US 64) in Clarksville north across US 62 to the Missouri state line. The route is a two-lane highway with the exception of a brief concurrency with US 62, a four-lane highway, in Berryville.

== Route description ==
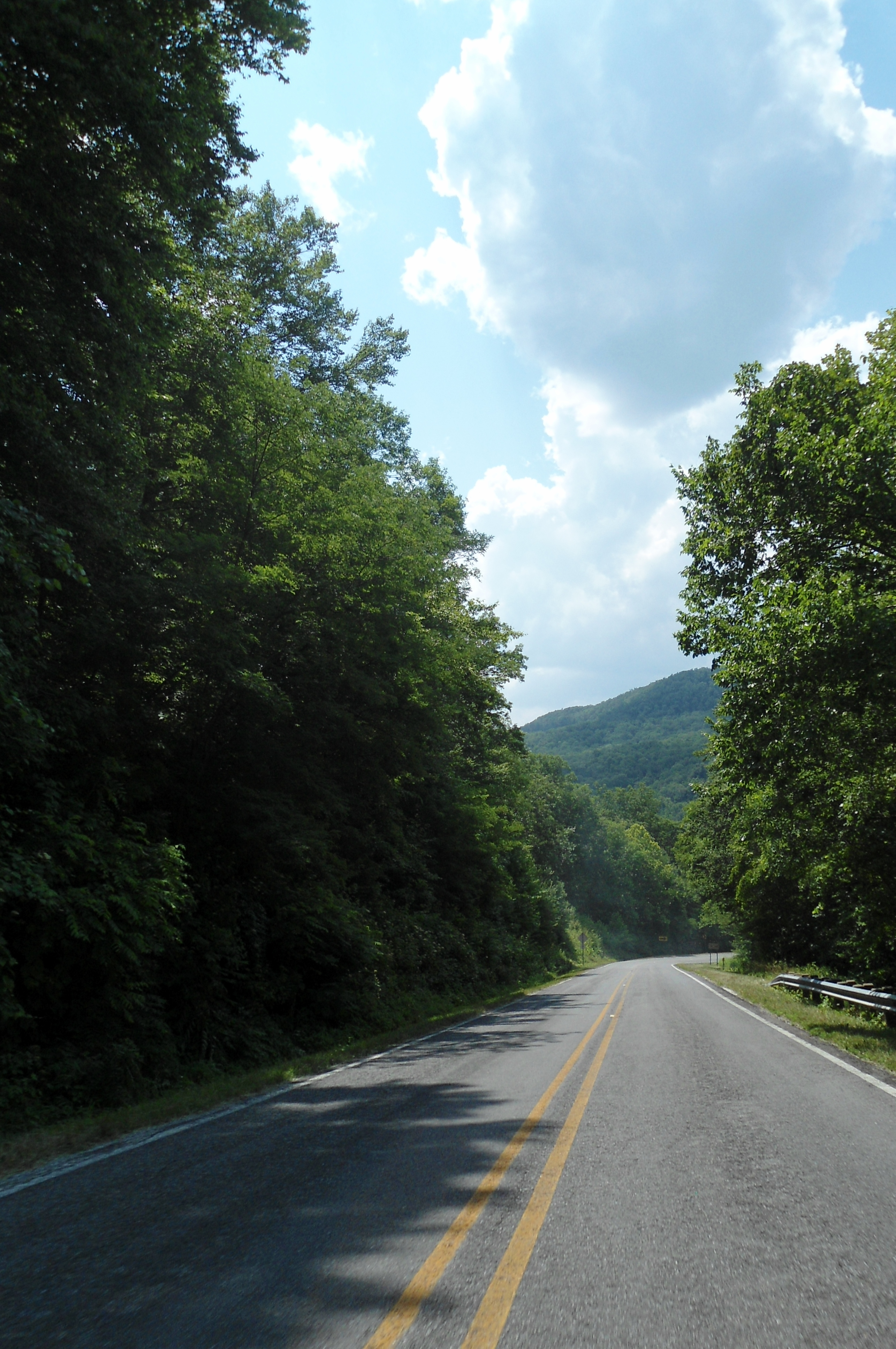
Near the northern end of the Ozark Highlands Scenic Byway

The route begins at US 64 in Clarksville near the Clarksville Municipal Airport and runs north to the Ozark National Forest. Highway 21 runs north to intersect Highway 292 near Ludwig and Ludwig Lake near Hillcrest in Johnson County. The route begins a concurrency with Highway 16 (Note: Although Arkansas highways normally terminate when intersected by a route of greater importance, Highway 21 in Madison County does not end when intersecting Highway 16.) until Edwards Junction when Highway 21 turns north and serves as a southern terminus for Highway 43 at Boxley. Upon entering Madison County, the highway intersects Highway 74 in Kingston and passes the Bank of Kingston, a property on the National Register of Historic Places. Continuing north, Highway 21 intersects US 412 and enters Carroll County, before following US 412 for a short distance to the east, where it turns back north. The route continues north through Carroll County and enters Berryville, before a brief concurrency with US 62, followed by a concurrency with Highway 221, after which it heads north to the Missouri state line, where it continues as Missouri Route 13.

=== Ozark Highlands Scenic Byway ===
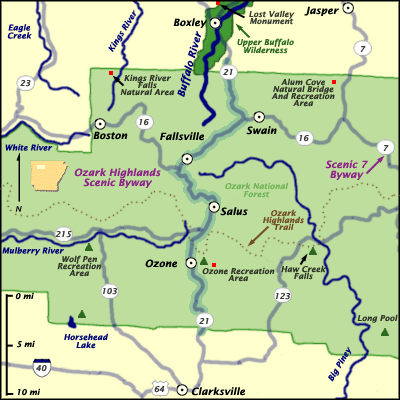
Map of the Ozark Highlands Scenic Byway

A portion of Highway 21 was designated as the Ozark Highlands Scenic Byway in 2005 by the Arkansas State Highway and Transportation Department (AHTD). The byway begins at the southern terminus of Highway 21 at US 64 in Clarksville and runs north to the Buffalo National River near Boxley. Wildlife and scenic views are frequent along the nearly 35-mile-long (56 km) route. The highway is popular as a major route to the Ozark National Forest, the Ozark Highlands Trail, and the White River in addition to being the major travel route to cities in the area and points in southern Missouri.

== Major intersections ==
Mile markers reset at some concurrencies.

County	Location	mi	km	Destinations	Notes
Johnson	Clarksville	0.00	0.00	US 64 (Main Street)	Southern terminus
Johnson	Clarksville	0.41	0.66	AR 164 east (Airport Road)	Western terminus of AR 164
Johnson	Ludwig	2.99	4.81	AR 292 east	Western terminus of AR 292
Johnson	Hillcrest			AR 818 – Arkansas Agricultural Experiment Station	
Newton	Fallsville	28.13	45.27	AR 16 west to AR 23 – Fayetteville	Southern end of AR 16 concurrency
Newton	Edwards Junction	36.71	59.08	AR 16 east to AR 7	Northern end of AR 16 concurrency
Newton	Boxley	48.04	77.31	AR 43 north – Ponca, Jasper	Southern terminus of AR 43
Madison	Kingston	57.45	92.46	AR 74 west to AR 23	Roundabout; eastern terminus of AR 74
Carroll		64.66	104.06	US 412 west – Huntsville	Southern end of US 412 concurrency
Carroll		0.00	0.00	US 412 east – Alpena	Northern end of US 412 concurrency
Carroll	Berryville	17.56	28.26	US 62 east – Harrison	Southern end of US 62 concurrency
Carroll	Berryville	0.00	0.00	US 62 west (AR 221 south) – Eureka Springs	Northern end of US 62 concurrency; southern end of AR 221 concurrency
Carroll	Berryville	2.16	3.48	AR 221 north	Northern end of AR 221 concurrency
Carroll	Oak Grove	12.55	20.20	AR 103 south – Green Forest	Northern terminus of AR 103
Carroll	Blue Eye	16.67	26.83	AR 311 south	Northern terminus of AR 311
Carroll	Blue Eye	16.92	27.23	Route 13 north – Springfield	Continuation into Missouri
1.000 mi = 1.609 km; 1.000 km = 0.621 mi: Concurrency terminus

== See also ==
- Arkansas Highway 21E
- Arkansas Highway 221
