= Arkansas Highway 74 =

State highway in Arkansas, United States

Highway 74

Route information
- Maintained by ArDOT

Location
- Country: United States
- State: Arkansas

Highway system
- Arkansas Highway System; Interstate; US; State; Business; Spurs; Suffixed; Scenic; Heritage
← AR 73	→ AR 75

Arkansas Highway 74 (AR 74 and Hwy. 74) is a series of state highways of 103.73 miles (166.94 km) total in Northwest and north central Arkansas and is divided into eight separate sections.

== Route description ==
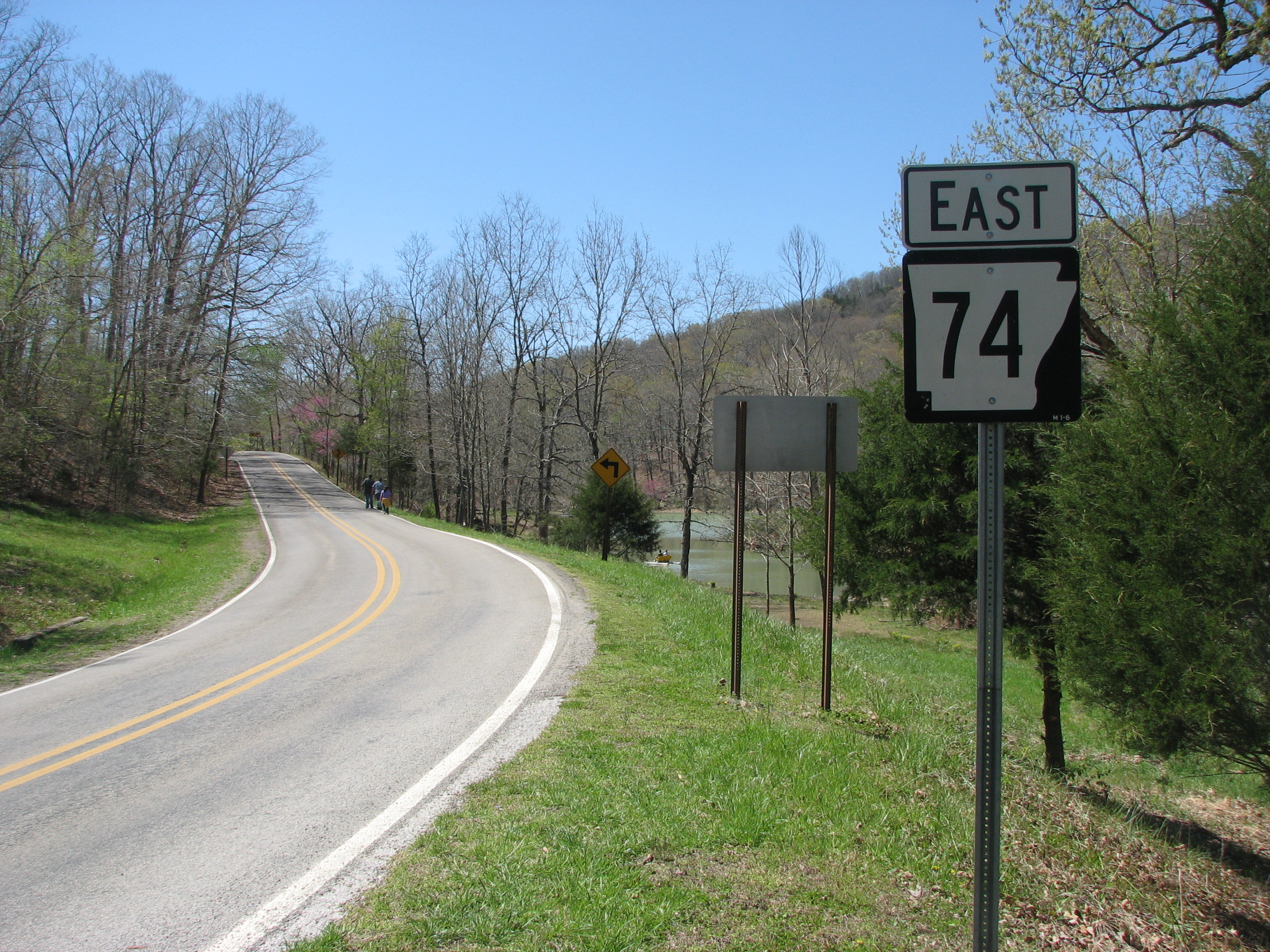
AR in Winslow

The westernmost section route begins in Devil's Den State Park at AR 170. The route winding out of the park heading east. AR 74 crosses I-49 at exit 45 before ending at US 71 in Winslow.

A second segment begins at US 71 just north of Winslow and runs east approximately two miles (3.2 km) before becoming County Road 43 (CR 43).

Section 3 begins at AR 16 in Elkins, running approximately 20 miles (32 km) before ending at US 412B in Huntsville.

A fourth section begins at AR 23 south of Huntsville, heading east 14 miles (23 km) before ending at AR 21 in Kingston.

Near Ponca a fifth section begins at AR 43, running east past Lost Valley for a distance of 20 miles (32 km), ending at AR 7 in Jasper.

South of Jasper, AR 74 resumes again, passing through unincorporated areas of Newton County. The route meets AR 123 in Piercetown and runs concurrently for four miles (6.4 km) before splitting off at Mount Judea. From there, it continues six more miles (9.7 km) miles to Bass, where it terminates at Cave Road.

AR 74 begins a seventh section in Snowball at AR 377. The route runs seven miles (11 km) to meet US 65 north of Marshall.

South of Marshall, AR 74 resumes, following AR 27 for one mile (1.6 km) before splitting off. It continues another 19 miles (31 km) before ending at AR 66 east of Thola.

== Major intersections ==
County	Location	mi	km	Destinations	Notes
Washington	Devil's Den State Park	0.0	0.0	AR 170 – West Fork	Western terminus
Washington	Winslow	6.8	10.9	I-49	Exit 45 on I-49; former I-540
Washington	Winslow	12.8	20.6	US 71 – Mountainburg, Alma	Southern end of US 71 concurrency
Washington	Brentwood	16.3	26.2	US 71 – Fayetteville	Northern end of US 71 concurrency
Washington	Wyola	18.7	30.1	CR 38	Eastern terminus
Washington	Gap in route				
Washington	Elkins	0.0	0.0	AR 16 – Fayetteville	Western terminus
Madison	Wesley	6.5	10.5	AR 295 – Hindsville	Southern terminus of AR 295
Madison	Lamar Township	8.6	13.8	AR 303	Northern terminus of AR 303
Madison		10.5	16.9	AR 295 – Japton	Northern terminus of AR 295
Madison	Huntsville	19.1	30.7	US 412B – Huntsville	Eastern terminus
Madison	Gap in route				
Madison		0.0	0.0	AR 23 – Huntsville, Eureka Springs	Western terminus
Madison		14.0	22.5	AR 21 – Berryville, Clarksville	Eastern terminus
Gap in route
Newton	Ponca	0.0	0.0	AR 43 – Compton, Harrison	Western terminus
Newton		13.7	22.0	AR 327 – Parthenon	Northern terminus of AR 327
Newton	Jasper	14.0	22.5	AR 7 – Harrison	Northern end of AR 7 concurrency
Newton	Jasper	14.1	22.7	AR 7 – Jasper, Russellville	Southern end of AR 7 concurrency
Newton	Jasper	14.1	22.7	AR 7 – Jasper, Russellville	Southern end AR 7 concurrency
Newton	Piercetown	23.8	38.3	AR 123 – Western Grove	Northern end of AR 123 concurrency
Newton	Vendor	26.0	41.8	AR 374 – Vendor	Eastern terminus of AR 374
Newton	Mount Judea	28.3	45.5	AR 123 – Pelsor, Russellville	Southern end of AR 123 concurrency
Newton	Bass	33.6	54.1	CR 38	Eastern terminus
Gap in route
Searcy	Snowball	0.0	0.0	AR 377 – Witts Spring	Western terminus; northern terminus of AR 366
Searcy		7.1	11.4	US 65 – Marshall, Harrison	Eastern terminus
Searcy	Gap in route				
Searcy	Marshall	0.0	0.0	AR 27 – Marshall, Big Flat	Western terminus
Stone	Alco	18.1	29.1	AR 66 – Mountain View, Leslie	Eastern terminus
1.000 mi = 1.609 km; 1.000 km = 0.621 mi: Concurrency terminus
