= Arkansas Highway 123 =

Highway in Arkansas

Highway 123
- AR 123 highlighted in red

Route information
- Maintained by ArDOT
- Existed: c. 1927–present

Section 1
- Length: 1.62 mi (2.61 km)
- South end: Salmon Lane
- North end: US 65B in Harrison

Section 2
- Length: 67.74 mi (109.02 km)
- South end: AR 103 in Clarksville
- North end: US 65 / US 65B in Western Grove

Location
- Country: United States
- State: Arkansas
- Counties: Boone, Johnson, Pope, Newton

Highway system
- Arkansas Highway System; Interstate; US; State; Business; Spurs; Suffixed; Scenic; Heritage
← AR 122	→ AR 124

Highway 123 (AR 123, Ark. 123, and Hwy. 123) is a designation for two state highways in Arkansas. One route begins at Salmon Lane in Boone County and runs 1.63 miles (2.62 km) north to US Highway 65 Business (US 65B) in Harrison. A second route begins at Highway 103 in Clarksville and runs 67.74 miles (109.02 km) northeast to US 65 and US 65B in Western Grove. A suffixed route, designated Highway 123Y runs near Lurton, giving non-truck travelers access to Highway 7. All three routes are maintained by the Arkansas Department of Transportation (ArDOT).

== Route description ==
=== Harrison ===
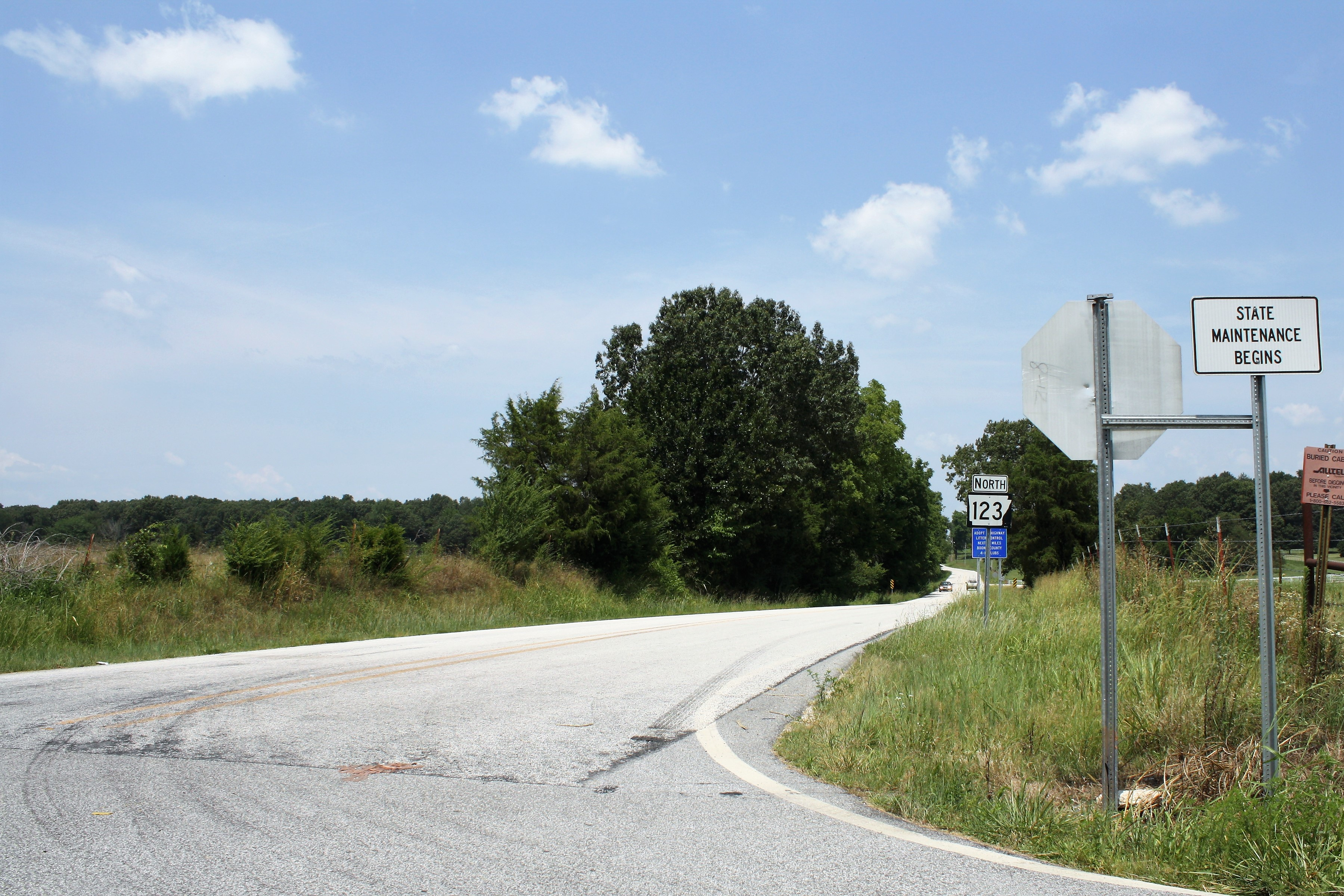
Southern terminus of Highway 123 in Boone County

The route begins at Salmon Lane south of Harrison and west of Bellefonte in Boone County. It runs directly north as a section line road to North Arkansas Community College. Shortly after passing the college, Highway 123 intersects US 65B, where it terminates. As of 2016, the route had an annual average daily traffic (AADT) of 600 vehicles per day (VPD).

=== Clarksville to Western Grove ===
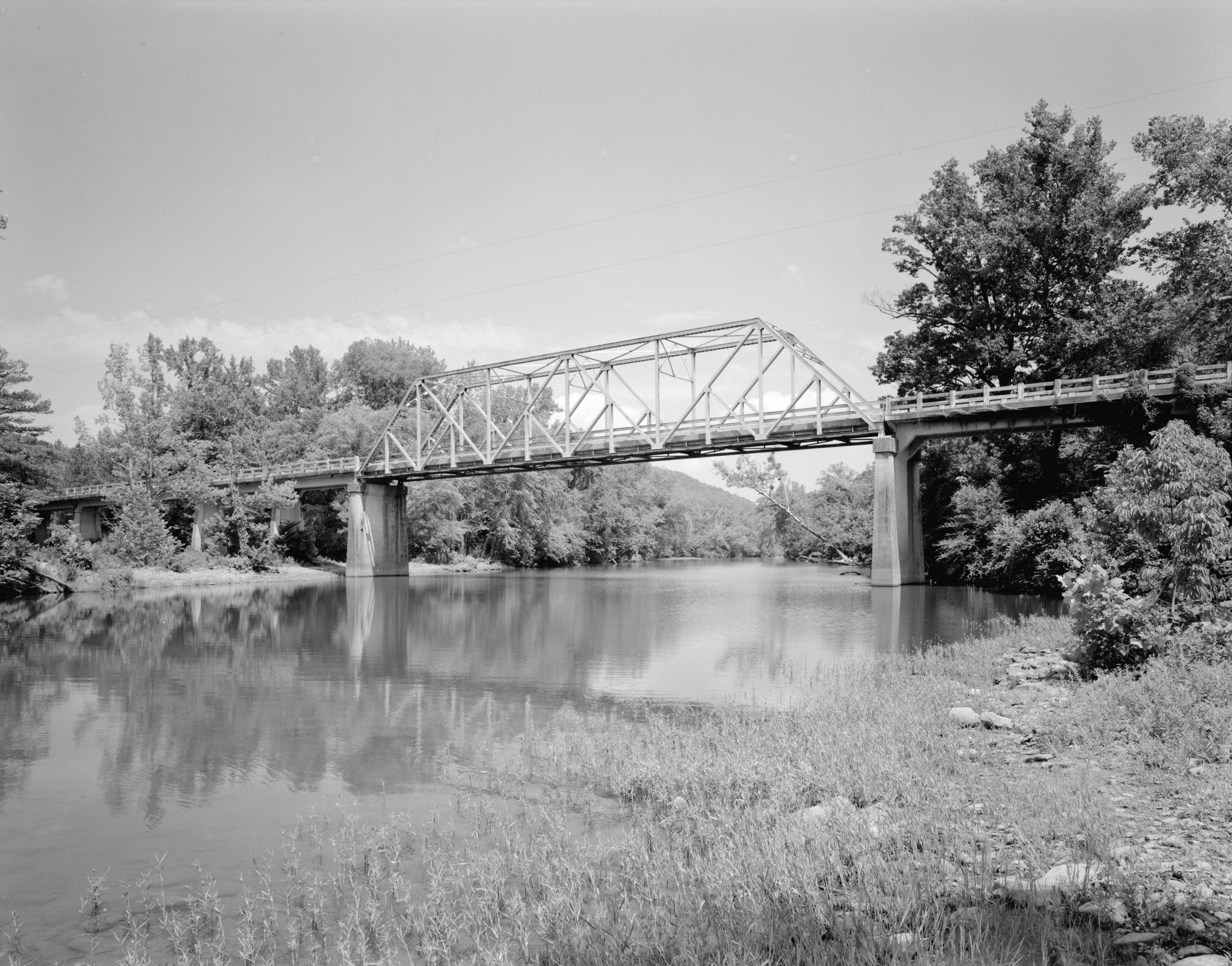
Highway 123 crosses Big Piney Creek on a 1931 Warren through truss bridge listed on the National Register of Historic Places

Highway 123 begins in the Arkansas River Valley in Clarksville, but quickly becomes a winding mountain highway, spending most of its length in the Ozark Mountains. The route is one of the few north–south corridors in the dense and sparsely populated forest, and passes many campsites, rivers, and hiking trails for recreational use. The route is a rural, two-lane road its entire length.

Highway 123 begins in Clarksville at Highway 103 in a residential subdivision. It runs east past Johnson Regional Medical Center and the historic Pioneer House before entering Lamar, where it overlaps US 64. Near downtown Lamar, Highway 123 turns north from US 64, forming an overlap with Highway 164 to Hagarville. North of Hagarville, the route enters the Ozark National Forest, becoming a winding rural road. It enters the Piney Creeks Wildlife Management Area (WMA), where it passes the Haw Creek Falls Recreation Area, bridges Big Piney Creek on a historic structure, crosses the Ozark Highlands Trail near Big Piney Creek, and forms the southern border of the Hurricane Creek Wilderness Area in the northeast corner of Johnson County.

The highway enters the northwest corner of Pope County, intersecting Highway 7 and Highway 16 at Sand Gap. The routes begin an overlap northbound, passing the Thomas J. Hankins House, listed on the National Register of Historic Places. In Newton County, the concurrency ends at Lurton, with Highway 7 and Highway 16 turning northwest toward Jasper and St. Paul. A wye connection provides non-truck travelers access to Highway 7 and Highway 16 at Lurton. Highway 123 winds north to Mount Judea, where an officially designated exception with Highway 74 forms. Highway 123/Highway 74 serve as the eastern terminus of Highway 374 south of Piercetown, when Highway 74 turns west toward Jasper. Highway 123 continues north, passing through the western side of the Gene Rush WMA and crossing the Buffalo National River near Carver Day Use Area, a river landing and campsite maintained by the National Park Service (NPS). Highway 123 runs north to Western Grove, where it terminates at US 65 and US 65B.

== History ==

Highway 123 was created by the Arkansas State Highway Commission (ASHC) after the 1926 Arkansas state highway numbering, appearing on the 1927 state highway map. The highway started at Highway 23 in St. Paul and ran north to Highway 7 near Freeman Springs. By the 1929 map, the route had been deleted from Highway 23 in St. Paul to a hanging end south of Oark, with the west end being moved from Clarksville to US 64 in Lamar, and the east end moving to Highway 7 and Highway 16 at Pelsor. The highway's routing remained unchanged until 1936 or the first half of 1937, when the section between Oark and Clarksville became Highway 103, with the former alignment of Highway 103 to Western Grove becoming Highway 123. This alignment change resulted in a Highway 123 alignment between Lamar and Western Grove very similar to the highway's present-day routing. It was extended to Clarksville in 1963.

The Harrison route was created on March 26, 1975 from US 65B to North Arkansas Community College. It was extended south to Salmon Lane on January 30, 1980. The extension was made at the request of the County Judge of Boone County, in exchange for decommissioning Highway 397 near Omaha.

== Major intersections ==
Mile markers reset at some concurrencies.

County	Location	mi	km	Destinations	Notes
Boone		0.00	0.00	Salmon Lane	Southern terminus
Boone	Harrison	1.62	2.61	US 65B (Main Street)	Northern terminus
Gap in route
Johnson	Clarksville	0.00	0.00	AR 103 (Rogers Street)	Southern terminus
Johnson	Lamar	2.42– 0.00	3.89– 0.00	US 64 (Main Street) – Ozark, Knoxville, Russellville	
Johnson		2.50	4.02	AR 164 west	Begin AR 164 overlap
Johnson		5.49	8.84	AR 292 west	AR 292 eastern terminus
Johnson	Hagarville	8.15	13.12	AR 164 east	End AR 164 overlap
Pope	Sand Gap	35.40	56.97	AR 7 south / AR 16 east – Russellville, Heber Springs	Begin AR 7/AR 16 overlap
Newton	Lurton	0.00	0.00	AR 7 north / AR 16 west – Jasper, Harrison	End AR 7/AR 16 overlap
Newton	Lurton	0.705	1.135	To AR 7 north	Access via AR 123Y
Newton	Mount Judea	14.581	23.466	AR 74 east – Bass	Begin AR 74 overlap
Newton		16.839	27.100	AR 374 west – Vendor	AR 374 eastern terminus
Newton	Piercetown	18.988	30.558	AR 74 west – Jasper	End AR 74 overlap
Newton		21.35– 21.60	34.36– 34.76	Bridge over the Buffalo National River	
Newton	Western Grove	32.341	52.048	US 65 / US 65B north – Harrison, Marshall	Northern terminus, US 65B southern terminus
1.000 mi = 1.609 km; 1.000 km = 0.621 mi: Concurrency terminus

== Lurton loop ==
Lurton Loop
- Location: Lurton
- Length: 0.533 mi (858 m)
- Existed: November 9, 1960–present

Highway 123Y Spur (AR 123Y, Ark. 123Y, Hwy. 123Y, and Lurton Loop) is a 0.533-mile (0.858 km) spur route at Lurton. It is an unsigned state highway.

Route description

The route provides more direct access for northbound traffic to Highway 7. Due to its steep grades and curves, trucks are not allowed on the route.

History

Highway 123Y is a former alignment of Highway 7. It was removed from the state highway system on October 31, 1956 following realignment of Highway 7, but was restored November 9, 1960.

Major intersections

The entire route is in Newton County.

Location	mi	km	Destinations	Notes
Lurton	0.00	0.00	AR 123	Eastern terminus
	0.533	0.858	AR 7 / AR 16	Western terminus
1.000 mi = 1.609 km; 1.000 km = 0.621 mi

== See also ==
- List of state highways in Arkansas
