= Arkansas Highway 7 =

Highway in Arkansas

Highway 7

Route information
- Maintained by ArDOT
- Length: 297.27 mi (478.41 km)
- Existed: 1926–present

Major junctions
- South end: LA 558 at the Louisiana state line near Lockhart, LA
- US 63 / US 167 near El Dorado; US 79 / US 278 in Camden; US 67 in Arkadelphia; I-30 / US 67 in Caddo Valley; US 64 in Russellville; I-40 in Russellville; US 65B in Harrison; US 62 / US 65 / US 412 in Harrison
- North end: Diamond Boulevard in Diamond City

Location
- Country: United States
- State: Arkansas
- Counties: Union, Ouachita, Dallas, Clark, Hot Spring, Garland, Perry, Yell, Pope, Newton, Boone

Highway system
- Arkansas Highway System; Interstate; US; State; Business; Spurs; Suffixed; Scenic; Heritage
← AR 6	→ AR 8

Arkansas Highway 7 (AR 7) is a north–south state highway in Arkansas, United States. As Arkansas's longest state highway, the route runs 297.27 miles (478.41 km) from the Louisiana state line north to Diamond City. With the exception of the segment north of Harrison, Highway 7 has been designated as an Arkansas Scenic Byway and a National Forest Scenic Byway. The road passes through the heart of both the Ozark Mountains and the Ouachita Mountains, and features scenic views. It's the route favored by motorcycle riders touring the region.

== Route description ==
Highway 7 begins at the Louisiana state line as a continuation of Louisiana Highway 558. It runs north and meets US 63/US 167, which it forms a concurrency with until El Dorado. North of El Dorado, Highway 7 shoots a spur route named the Calion Cutoff. The route continues north to cross Highway 335 before entering Smackover. Highway 7B runs through downtown Smackover, while the main route runs around the town meeting Highway 172. Highway 7 continues northwest to enter Ouachita County. Highway 7 runs roughly parallel to Highway 376 until meeting the route south of Cullendale. The route continues north to Camden, when it intersects US 79/US 278 (formerly Highway 4). Highway 7 continues north through downtown and heads northwest to enter Dallas County.

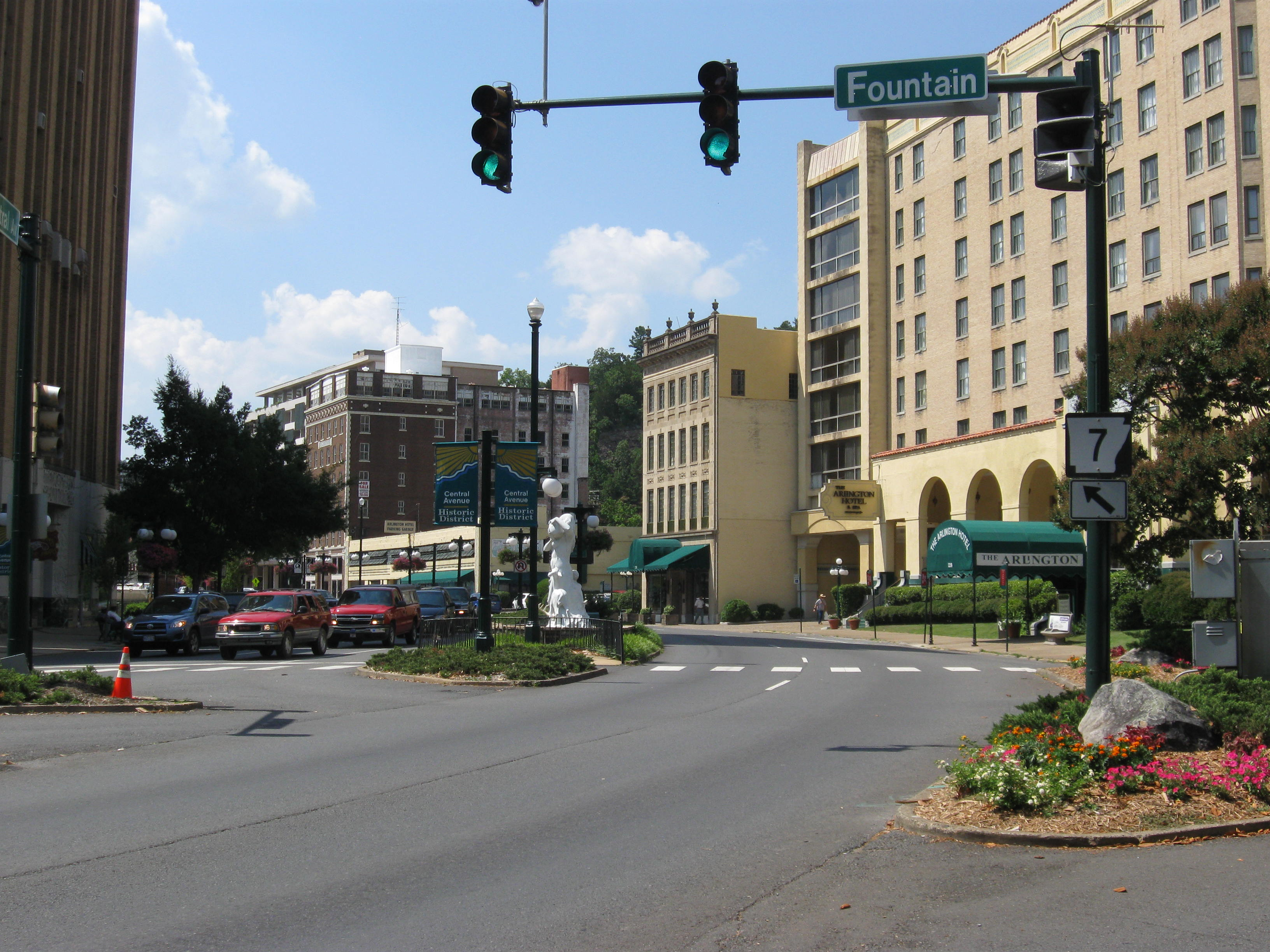
Highway 7 in historic Hot Springs National Park.

Highway 7 enters Dallas County near Ouachita and continues north to meet Highway 208 in Sparkman. The route continues north to Highway 8 and Dalark. Highway 7 runs west after meeting Highway 8, leading into Clark County. Highway 7/Highway 8 runs to meet Highway 51/Highway 128 east of Arkadelphia. In Arkadelphia, Highway 7 meets US 67, which it follows north to Caddo Valley and I-30. After crossing I-30, Highway 7 continues north through DeGray Lake Resort State Park, now entering Hot Spring County, where it meets Highway 84 in Bismarck.

Highway 7 enters Garland County by crossing over Lake Hamilton and crossing through the community of Lake Hamilton. Highway 7 continues into Hot Springs, crossing US 70/US 270. The route enters Hot Springs National Park with Highway 128. The route meets Highway 298 north of Hot Springs Village, running with it until an area near the Perry County line. The route runs through the Ouachita National Forest until the Fourche Junction meeting with Highway 60.

The route continues in Yell County by running through Ola. The route meets Highway 10 and Highway 28 in Ola. Highway 7 continues northeast to Centerville, meeting Highway 154 and Highway 247. Highway 7 also meets Highway 115 before Dardanelle. The route turns right at Union Street in Dardanelle, entering Pope County. The route continues through Russellville, meeting US 64 and Highway 124 before leaving town. Highway 7 also meets I-40 north of Russellville. Continuing north, Highway 7 meets Highway 164 in Dover. In the Ozark National Forest, Highway 7 meets Highway 16 and Highway 123 before entering Newton County. Highway 7 breaks north from Highway 16 towards Highway 74 and Jasper. Highway 7 crosses Highway 206 upon entering Boone County. Highway 7 enters Harrison, meeting Highway 43, and having an officially designated exception over US 65B and US 62/US 65/US 412. It is after this point that the route is no longer designated scenic. The route continues north to Highway 14 and Lead Hill before entering Diamond City, after which it continues as Diamond Boulevard.

== History ==

The route now known as Highway 7 first appears as a state maintained road in 1924, when the Arkansas General Assembly first created a federal aid system. Two main routes, State Road B-14 and State Road A-5 form a rough trail similar to the present-day Highway 7. Upon creation of the U.S. Route system in 1925, the north and south portions of the highway were replaced by US 65 to Harrison and US 167, respectively. Arkansas numbered its highways in 1926, and the route became Highway 7 (the north part of A-5 remains as Highway 5).

== Major intersections ==
Mile markers reset at some concurrencies.

County	Location	mi	km	Exit	Destinations	Notes
Union		0.00	0.00		LA 558 south – Lockhart	Continuation into Louisiana
Union		9.19	14.79		US 63 south / US 167 south – Junction City, Ruston LA	Southern end of US 63/US 167 concurrency
Union	El Dorado				US 82 – Magnolia, Crossett, South Arkansas Regional Airport	Exit 22 on US 82
Union	El Dorado			Southern end of freeway section		
Union	El Dorado			15	US 82B / US 167B north (Hillsboro Street)	Southern terminus of US 167B
Union	El Dorado			16	US 63 north – Warren	Northern end of US 63 concurrency
Union	El Dorado			17	Champagnolle Road	
Union	El Dorado	0.00	0.00	19	US 167 north / US 167B south – Fordyce, Little Rock, El Dorado Business District	Northern end of US 167 concurrency; northern terminus of US 167B
Union	El Dorado	0.00	0.00	Northern end of freeway section		
Union		2.79	4.49		AR 7S south (North West Avenue)	Northern terminus of AR 7S
Union		3.16	5.09		AR 335 north – Norphlet, South Arkansas Regional Airport	Southern terminus of AR 335
Union		6.39	10.28		AR 7B north – Smackover	Southern terminus of AR 7B
Union	Smackover	8.82	14.19		AR 172 west – Lisbon	Eastern terminus of AR 172
Union		9.96	16.03		AR 160 – Mount Holly, Smackover	
Union		11.18	17.99		AR 7B south – Smackover	Northern terminus of AR 7B
Ouachita		13.11	21.10		AR 376 west – Louann	Eastern terminus of AR 376
Ouachita		22.14	35.63		AR 376	
Ouachita	Camden	24.57	39.54		AR 376 east	Southern end of AR 376 concurrency
Ouachita	Camden	24.69	39.73		AR 376 west (Fairview Road) – Magnolia	Northern end of AR 376 concurrency
Ouachita	Camden	27.06	43.55		US 79 / US 278 to AR 24 – Hope, Pine Bluff, Little Rock, White Oak Lake State Park	Interchange
Ouachita	Camden	28.33	45.59		US 79B south (Van Buren Street)	Southern end of US 79B concurrency
Ouachita		0.00	0.00		US 79B north – Fordyce	Northern end of US 79B concurrency
Dallas	Ouachita	20.13	32.40		AR 207 north – Pine Grove	Southern terminus of AR 207
Dallas	Sparkman	25.33	40.76		AR 128 east (Main Street) – Holly Springs, Sparkman Business District	Western terminus of AR 128
Dallas		34.03	54.77		AR 8 east – Manning, Fordyce	Southern end of AR 8 concurrency
Clark	Gravel Junction	38.71	62.30		AR 128 west – Joan	Eastern terminus of AR 128
Clark	Daleville	46.17	74.30		AR 51 north – Joan	Southern end of AR 51 concurrency
Clark	Arkadelphia				US 67 south	Southern end of US 67 concurrency
Clark	Arkadelphia				AR 8 west / AR 51 south (Pine Street) to I-30 – Antoine, Amity	Northern end of AR 8/AR 51 concurrency
Clark	Caddo Valley	0.00	0.00		US 67 north – Malvern	Northern end of US 67 concurrency
Clark	Caddo Valley	0.20	0.32		I-30 – Texarkana, Little Rock	Exit 38 on I-30
Clark	Caddo Valley	0.33	0.53		AR 390 west – Arkadelphia Human Development Center, Lower Lake Recreation Area	Eastern terminus of AR 390
Clark	Caddo Valley	2.45	3.94		AR 283 north	Southern terminus of AR 283
Hot Spring		7.42	11.94		AR 128 east – Caney	Western terminus of AR 128
Hot Spring	Bismarck	11.89	19.14		AR 84 – Amity, Malvern	
Garland	Lake Hamilton	23.10	37.18		AR 290 east – Diamondhead, Lake Catherine State Park, Andrew H. Hulsey Fish Hatchery, Garvan Woodland Gardens	Western terminus of AR 290
Garland	Lake Hamilton	24.82– 25.24	39.94– 40.62	Bridges over Lake Hamilton		
Garland	Hot Springs	26.29	42.31		AR 88 east (Higdon Ferry Road)	Western terminus of AR 88
Garland	Hot Springs	28.46	45.80		US 70 / US 270 – Glenwood, Mount Ida, Malvern, Little Rock	Exit 5 on US 70/US 270
Garland	Hot Springs	29.73	47.85		AR 88 west (Higdon Ferry Road)	Eastern terminus of AR 88
Garland	Hot Springs	31.12	50.08		US 70B / US 270B (West Grand Avenue)	
Garland	Hot Springs	34.22	55.07		AR 7S south (Gorge Road) – National Park Campground	Northern terminus of AR 7S; former US 70B
Garland		38.39	61.78		AR 5 – Benton, Glenwood, Mount Ida	Roundabout
Garland	Hot Springs Village	46.0	74.0		AR 192 west – Lake Ouachita State Park	Eastern terminus of AR 192
Garland	Blue Springs	48.38	77.86		AR 298 west – Story	Eastern terminus of AR 298
Perry	Hollis	66.19	106.52		AR 314 west	Eastern terminus of AR 314
Perry	Fourche Junction	75.77	121.94		AR 60 – Plainview, Perryville, Nimrod WMA	
Yell	Ola	83.62	134.57		AR 28 west – Plainview	Southern end of AR 28 concurrency
Yell	Ola	83.86	134.96		AR 10 east – Little Rock AR 28 ends	Southern end of AR 10 concurrency; northern terminus of AR 28
Yell	Ola	0.00	0.00		AR 10 west – Booneville	Northern end of AR 10 concurrency
Yell	Centerville	6.84	11.01		AR 154 – Mount George, Pontoon, Petit Jean State Park	
Yell	Elberta	11.95	19.23		AR 155 south to AR 154	Northern terminus of AR 155
Yell	Dardanelle	13.71	22.06		AR 28 west – Mount George	Eastern terminus of AR 28
Yell	Dardanelle	14.55	23.42		AR 27 south – Danville	Northern terminus of AR 27
Yell	Dardanelle	14.60	23.50		AR 22 west – Paris, Fort Smith, Mount Nebo State Park, Mount Magazine State Park	Eastern terminus of AR 22
Arkansas River		15.32– 15.72	24.66– 25.30	Bridge		
Pope	Russellville	16.31	26.25		AR 247 north to I-40 east – Pottsville	Southern terminus of AR 247
Pope	Russellville	17.38	27.97		AR 7S west (Lock & Dam Road) – Arkansas River Visitor Center	Eastern terminus of AR 7S
Pope	Russellville	17.53	28.21		AR 7T north (Bernice Avenue) / AR 326 west (Boulder Avenue) – Norristown, Atkins, Lake Dardanelle State Park	Southern terminus of AR 7T; counterclockwise terminus of AR 326
Pope	Russellville	19.51	31.40		US 64 (Main Street)	
Pope	Russellville	21.60	34.76		AR 326 west (Lake Front Drive) – Lake Dardanelle State Park	Clockwise terminus of AR 326
Pope	Russellville	21.67	34.87		I-40 – Fort Smith, Little Rock	Exit 81 on I-40
Pope	Dover	28.70	46.19		AR 164 east (Water Street) – Moreland	Western terminus of AR 164
Pope	Dover	28.74	46.25		AR 27 north (Camp Street) – Scottsville	Southern terminus of AR 27
Pope		30.26	48.70		AR 333 south – Augsburg	Northern terminus of AR 333
Pope		34.26	55.14		AR 164 west – Hagarville	Eastern terminus of AR 164
Pope	Pelsor	57.52	92.57		AR 16 east / AR 123 south to AR 164 – Dillen, Ben Hur	Western terminus of AR 16; northern terminus of AR 123
Newton		60.86	97.94		AR 123 north – Lurton	Southern terminus of AR 123
Newton		61.66	99.23		To AR 123 north – Lurton	Access via AR 123Y
Newton		71.50	115.07		AR 16 west – Deer	Eastern terminus of AR 16
Newton		81.42	131.03		AR 374 east to AR 123 – Vendor	Western terminus of AR 374
Newton	Jasper	86.17	138.68		AR 74 east to AR 123	Southern end of AR 74 concurrency
Newton	Jasper	86.30	138.89		AR 74 west – Ponca	Northern end of AR 74 concurrency
Newton	Dogpatch	96.53	155.35		AR 7S south – Marble Falls	Northern terminus of AR 7S
Boone	Elmwood Township	98.31	158.21		AR 206 – Gaither, Bellefonte	
Boone	Harrison	104.03	167.42		AR 43 south (Wilson Avenue) – Compton, Ponca	Northern terminus of AR 43
Boone	Harrison	104.80	168.66		AR 392 west (South Pine Street) – Capps	Eastern terminus of AR 392
Boone	Harrison	105.00	168.98		US 65B south (Main Street)	Southern end of US 65B concurrency
Boone	Harrison	105.42	169.66		US 62 east / US 65 south / US 412 east US 65B ends	Southern end of US 62/US 65/US 412 concurrency; northern terminus of US 65B
Boone	Harrison	105.54	169.85		US 62 west / US 65 north / US 412 west – Branson, MO	Northern end of US 62/US 65/US 412 concurrency
Boone	Harrison	107.57	173.12		AR 43 south	Northern terminus of AR 43
Boone		115.90	186.52		AR 281 north – Omaha, Tucker Hollow Recreation Area	Southern terminus of AR 281
Boone		124.78	200.81		AR 14 east – Yellville	Southern end of AR 14 concurrency
Boone	Lead Hill	126.00	202.78		AR 14 west – Omaha, Tucker Hollow Park	Northern end of AR 14 concurrency
Boone	Diamond City	129.72	208.76		Diamond Boulevard	Continuation north
1.000 mi = 1.609 km; 1.000 km = 0.621 mi: Concurrency terminus

== Auxiliary routes ==
Highway 7 has six total auxiliary routes. Highway B in Smackover runs into town while the city is bypassed by the parent route. El Dorado, Hot Springs, and Russellville all have short spur routes serving as connectors. Highway 7T also serves as a bypass in Russellville, where Highway 7S near Marble Falls serves former amusement park Dogpatch USA.

== See also ==
- List of longest state highways in the United States
