= Big Piney Creek =

Location
- Country: United States
- State: Arkansas

Physical characteristics
- Source
  - location: Ozark National Forest, Newton County, Arkansas
  - coordinates: 35°45′24″N 93°26′34″W
  - elevation: 2000 ft
- Mouth
  - location: Lake Dardanelle, Johnson County, Arkansas
  - coordinates: 35°20′34″N 93°19′44″W
  - elevation: 338 ft
- Length: 70.8 mi (113.9 km)
- Discharge
  - location: Dover, Arkansas
  - average: 485 c/ft. per sec.

National Wild and Scenic Rivers System
- Type: Scenic
- Designated: April 22, 1992

Big Piney Creek is a river located in Ozark National Forest in the state of Arkansas. It is a tributary of the Arkansas River and therefore part of the Mississippi River watershed. Managed by the United States Forest Service, it flows for 70.8 miles (113.9 km) through Pope, Johnson and Newton counties. The headwaters of the creek are in a rugged, remote area just east of Arkansas Route 21 south of the community of Fallsville and the mouth of the creek empties into Lake Dardanelle on the Arkansas River.

The creek is known among kayakers and canoers for its moderately challenging Class II to Class III rapids. Although much of the land adjacent to the creek is privately owned, the Forest Service operates two campgrounds, Haw Creek Falls and Long Pool, for visitors.

== Big Piney Creek Bridge ==
The Big Piney Creek Bridge is a historic bridge, carrying Arkansas Highway 123 across Big Piney Creek in the Ozark-St. Francis National Forest, northeast of Hagarville, Arkansas. The bridge was listed on the National Register of Historic Places in 1990.

== See also ==
- List of Arkansas rivers
