= U.S. Route 412 in Arkansas =

US Highway section within the state of Arkansas

U.S. Highway 412
- US 412 highlighted in red

Route information
- Maintained by ArDOT
- Length: 290 mi (470 km)
- Existed: 1988–present

Major junctions
- West end: Future I-42 / US 412 at the Oklahoma state line in Siloam Springs
- I-42 in Tontitown; I-49 / US 62 / US 71 in Springdale; US 62 in Alpena; US 65 near Harrison; US 65 in Bellefonte; US 167 in Ash Flat; US 63 in Hardy; I-57 / US 67 / US 63 in Hoxie; US 49 in Paragould
- East end: US 412 at the Missouri state line near Paragould

Location
- Country: United States
- State: Arkansas
- Counties: Benton, Washington, Madison, Carroll, Boone, Marion, Baxter, Fulton, Sharp, Lawrence, Randolph, Greene

Highway system
- United States Numbered Highway System; List; Special; Divided; Arkansas Highway System; Interstate; US; State; Business; Spurs; Suffixed; Scenic; Heritage
← AR 400	→ US 425
← US 67	AR 68	→ I-69

U.S. Highway 412 (US 412) runs east-to-west through northern Arkansas for about 290 miles (470 km). The route begins at the Oklahoma state line in Siloam Springs and ends at the Missouri state line east of Paragould.

== Route description ==
=== Oklahoma to Alpena ===
US 412 continues from Oklahoma and heads directly towards the east. The route travels through the town of Siloam Springs, intersecting AR 16 and AR 59 along the way. The route continues to head east into the Northwest Arkansas metropolitan area, mainly traveling through the city of Springdale. The route intersects I-49 and US 71B, sharing a short concurrency with it. Afterwards, the route travels into the Boston Mountains, intersecting the communities of Hindsville and Huntsville along the way. The route continues through the mountains and is very rural. It reaches US 62 in Alpena. This would be the western end of the concurrency with US 62.

=== US 62/63 concurrency ===
US 412 shares a concurrency with US 62 for about 142 miles (229 km), beginning in Alpena and ending in Imboden. During this time, the routes intersect several communities and many highways along the way, traveling through the cities of Harrison, Yellville, Mountain Home, and Cherokee Village. Both routes also share a concurrency with US 65 for about 12.2 miles (19.6 km), beginning north of Harrison, and ending in Bellefonte. US 62/412 also intersect US 63 in Hardy, and also share a concurrency with the route for about 35 miles (56 km). US 412 also shares a concurrency with US 63 beginning in Hardy, and ending in Hoxie. US 62 is still concurrent with both routes during this time, however, the east end of the US 62 concurrency ends at Imboden, about 18 miles (29 km) before the east end of the US 63 concurrency. In Hoxie, US 412 splits apart from US 63, and concurs with US 67/I-57 to head northeast to east of Walnut Ridge.

=== Walnut Ridge to Missouri ===
US 412 continues directly east of Walnut Ridge towards Paragould, approaching US 49. The route continues into the Missouri Bootheel just east of Paragould. The entire route in Arkansas, including concurrencies, is about 290 miles (470 km) long.

== History ==
U.S. Route 412 was initially built in 1987, as a route that spanned from Jackson, Tennessee to Walnut Ridge, Arkansas. In 1988, US 412 was extended all the way to Oklahoma, following numerous other highways that have previously been built.

=== Arkansas Highway 68 ===
Highway 68
- Location: Siloam Springs–Alpena
- Length: 88 mi (142 km)
- Existed: 1926–1988

US 412 between the Oklahoma state line and Alpena was formerly known as Arkansas Highway 68 until 1988 when US 412 was extended to Oklahoma. The route began at OK 33 at the Oklahoma state line near Siloam Springs (now US 412) and ended at US 62 in Alpena.

== Future ==
Future Interstate 42
- Location: Oklahoma state line – Tontitown
- Length: 17 mi (27 km)

In Springdale, a bypass will be constructed to serve as a bypass for US 412. A portion between I-49 and AR 112 opened April 30, 2018 and was designated as AR 612.

On May 20, 2021, Senator Jim Inhofe of Oklahoma introduced legislation to designate the portion of US 412 between I-35 in Noble County, Oklahoma and I-49 in Springdale as a future Interstate. The bill, titled the "Future Interstate in Oklahoma and Arkansas Act" (S. 1766), was cosponsored by senators John Boozman and Tom Cotton, both from Arkansas. The senators' stated reasons for seeking an Interstate designation along US 412 included encouraging economic development, expanding opportunities for employment in the region, making travel safer and shipping easier, attracting new businesses, and better connecting rural and urban communities. Other supporters of the measure include the mayor of Tulsa, G. T. Bynum, and the heads of both ArDOT and the Oklahoma Department of Transportation (ODOT). In the Infrastructure Investment and Jobs Act, part of the route is designated as a future interstate. The bill says “the route that generally follows United States Route 412 from its intersection with Interstate Route 35 in Noble County, Oklahoma, passing through Tulsa, Oklahoma, to its intersection with Interstate Route 49 in Springdale, Arkansas.” Interstate 42 (I-42) was the proposed designation but was withdrawn. However, ArDOT and ODOT later resubmitted the application to the Spring 2024 meeting; AASHTO approved the route as Interstate 42, conditional on it being upgraded to Interstate standards.

== Major intersections ==
County	Location	mi	km	Destinations	Notes
Benton	Siloam Springs	0.0	0.0	Future I-42 west / US 412 west – Tulsa	Continuation into Oklahoma
Benton	Siloam Springs	2.1	3.4	AR 59 south – Summers, Lincoln	Western end of AR 59 concurrency
Benton	Siloam Springs	3.2	5.1	AR 16 east – Fayetteville	Western terminus of AR 16
Benton	Siloam Springs	4.2	6.8	AR 59 north – Gentry, Gravette	Eastern end of AR 59 concurrency
Washington	Tontitown	15.8	25.4	I-42 east (Springdale Northern Bypass) to I-49 – Bentonville	Current western terminus of I-42
Washington	Tontitown	20.2	32.5	AR 112 – Fayetteville, Elm Springs, Cave Springs	
Washington	Springdale	22.1	35.6	I-49 (US 62 / US 71) – Fayetteville, Bentonville, Fort Smith	Exit 72 on I-49; former I-540
Washington	Springdale	24.7	39.8	US 71B north – Rogers	Western end of US 71B concurrency
Washington	Springdale	25.1	40.4	US 71B south – Fayetteville	Eastern end of US 71B concurrency
Washington	Springdale	24.7	39.8	AR 265 – Fayetteville, Lowell	
Washington	Blue Springs Village	33.9	54.6	AR 612 west (Springdale Northern Bypass) to I-42 west	Proposed interchange
Washington	Spring Valley	37.2	59.9	AR 303 south – Mayfield	Western end of AR 303 concurrency
Washington		38.1	61.3	AR 303 north	Eastern end of AR 303 concurrency
Madison		40.2	64.7	AR 295 south – Wesley	Northern terminus of AR 295
Madison	Hindsville	41.7	67.1	US 412B / AR 45 – Hindsville, Goshen, Clifty	
Madison	Hindsville	43.2	69.5	US 412B – Hindsville	
Madison	Huntsville	48.7	78.4	US 412B – Huntsville	
Madison	Huntsville	50.8	81.8	AR 23 – Huntsville, Eureka Springs	Interchange
Madison	Huntsville	52.5	84.5	US 412B – Huntsville	
Madison		54.6	87.9	AR 127 north – Alabam	Southern terminus of AR 127
Madison–Carroll county line		62.8	101.1	AR 21 south – Kingston, Ponca	Western end of AR 21 concurrency
Carroll		63.1	101.5	AR 21 north – Berryville	Eastern end of AR 21 concurrency
Carroll	Gobbler	70.0	112.7	AR 103 north – Rudd, Green Forest	Western end of AR 103 concurrency
Carroll	Osage	73.2	117.8	AR 103 south – Osage, Compton	Eastern end of AR 103 concurrency
Carroll–Boone county line	Alpena	84.0	135.2	US 62 west – Berryville, Eureka Springs	Western end of US 62 concurrency
Boone		92.1	148.2	AR 392 east – Batavia, Capps	Western terminus of AR 392
Boone	Bear Creek Springs	95.1	153.0	US 65 north – Branson, MO, Springfield, MO	Western end of US 65 concurrency; interchange
Boone	Harrison	98.3	158.2	AR 980 – Boone County Regional Airport	Northern terminus of AR 980
Boone	Harrison	100.1	161.1	AR 43 east	Western terminus of AR 43
Boone	Harrison	100.6	161.9	US 65B – Harrison	
Boone	Harrison	102.3	164.6	AR 7 north – Bergman, Lead Hill	Western end of AR 7 concurrency
Boone	Harrison	102.5	165.0	AR 7 south – Harrison, Jasper	Eastern end of AR 7 concurrency
Boone	Harrison	104.2	167.7	US 65B / AR 123 – Harrison, North Arkansas College	
Boone	Bellefonte	106.7	171.7	AR 206 west	Eastern terminus of AR 206
Boone	Bellefonte	107.7	173.3	US 65 south – Marshall, Clinton, Little Rock	Eastern end of US 65 concurrency
Marion	Pyatt	119.6	192.5	AR 125 south – Eros	Western end of AR 125 concurrency
Marion	Cedar Grove	125.8	202.5	AR 125 north – Dodd City, Peel	Eastern end of AR 125 concurrency
Marion	Yellville	128.7	207.1	AR 202 east – Summit	Western terminus of AR 202
Marion	Yellville	130.4	209.9	AR 14 west – Lead Hill	Western end of AR 14 concurrency
Marion	Yellville	130.7	210.3	AR 14 east to AR 235 – Big Flat, Mountain View	Eastern end of AR 14 concurrency
Marion	Flippin	135.6	218.2	AR 178 east – Flippin, Bull Shoals	Western terminus of AR 178
Marion	Flippin	138.2	222.4	AR 101 south – Rea Valley	Northern terminus of AR 101
Marion	Flippin	138.8	223.4	US 62B – Cotter	
Baxter	Cotter	141.7	228.0	US 62B – Cotter	
Baxter	Gassville	143.0	230.1	AR 345 south – Cotter	Western end of AR 345 concurrency
Baxter	Gassville	143.6	231.1	AR 345 north – Gassville	Eastern end of AR 345 concurrency
Baxter	Gassville	143.9	231.6	AR 126 north – Midway	Western end of AR 126 concurrency
Baxter		146.9	236.4	AR 126 south – Buford, White Buffalo	Eastern end of AR 126 concurrency
Baxter	Mountain Home	149.3	240.3	US 62B – Mountain Home	
Baxter	Mountain Home	149.3	240.3	US 62B – Mountain Home	
Baxter	Mountain Home	149.8	241.1	AR 201 – Mountain Home, Norfork	
Baxter	Mountain Home	152.1	244.8	AR 5 – Mountain Home, Mountain View, Gainesville, MO	Interchange
Baxter	Mountain Home	153.7	247.4	AR 178 – Mountain Home, Buzzard Roost	
Baxter	Mountain Home	154.9	249.3	US 62B – Mountain Home	
Baxter		159.1	256.0	AR 101 – Gamaliel, Bakersfield, MO	Southern terminus of AR 101
Fulton	Gepp	169.8	273.3	AR 87 – Elizabeth, Bakersfield, MO	
Fulton	Viola	177.8	286.1	AR 223 – Pineville, Calico Rock	
Fulton	Salem	186.6	300.3	US 62B – Salem	
Fulton	Salem	187.2	301.3	AR 395 south	Northern terminus of AR 395
Fulton	Salem	187.6	301.9	AR 9 to AR 395 north – Melbourne, Mammoth Spring, West Plains, MO	
Fulton	Glencoe	195.2	314.1	AR 289 south – Horseshoe Bend	Western end of AR 289 concurrency
Fulton		202.4	325.7	AR 289 north – Cherokee Village, Mammoth Spring	Eastern end of AR 289 concurrency
Sharp	Ash Flat	204.7	329.4	US 167 south – Cave City, Batesville	Northern terminus of US 167
Sharp	Highland	208.3	335.2	AR 175S – Cherokee Village	Southern terminus of AR 175S
Sharp	Cherokee Village	213.4	343.4	AR 175 – Cherokee Village	Eastern terminus of AR 175
Sharp	Hardy	214.2	344.7	AR 342 east	Western terminus of AR 342
Sharp	Hardy	214.8	345.7	US 63B – Hardy	
Sharp	Hardy	215.1	346.2	US 63 north – Mammoth Spring, Thayer, MO	Western end of US 63 concurrency
Sharp	Hardy	216.7	348.7	US 63B – Hardy	
Sharp		218.1	351.0	AR 175 north – Wirth	Southern terminus of AR 175
Sharp	Ozark Acres	223.2	359.2	AR 58 west – Williford, Poughkeepsie	Eastern terminus of AR 58
Sharp		225.2	362.4	AR 58E west – Williford	Eastern terminus of AR 58E
Lawrence	Ravenden	231.6	372.7	AR 90 east – Ravenden Springs, Pocahontas	Western terminus of AR 90
Randolph	No major junctions				
Lawrence	Imboden	236.4	380.4	AR 115 south – Smithville	Northern terminus of AR 115
Lawrence	Imboden	236.9	381.3	US 62 east – Pocahontas, Corning	Eastern end of US 62 concurrency
Lawrence	Black Rock	244.1	392.8	AR 117 south – Smithville	Western end of AR 117 concurrency
Lawrence	Black Rock	245.3	394.8	AR 117 north – Black Rock	Eastern end of AR 117 concurrency
Lawrence	Black Rock	246.2	396.2	AR 25 south – Black Rock, Strawberry, Batesville	Northern terminus of AR 25
Lawrence	Portia	250.0	402.3	US 412B east – Walnut Ridge	
Lawrence	Hoxie	252.3	406.0	US 63B south – Hoxie	
Lawrence	Hoxie	254.6	409.7	AR 367 – Walnut Ridge, Tuckerman	Former US 67
Lawrence	Hoxie	256.6	413.0	I-57 south / US 67 south / US 63 south – Jonesboro, Newport, Little Rock	Eastern end of US 63 concurrency; western end of I-57/US 67 concurrency; exits 121A-B on I-57
Lawrence	Walnut Ridge	259.4	417.5	US 67 north / US 412B west – Walnut Ridge, Pocahontas I-57 ends	Eastern end of US 67 concurrency; current northern terminus and exit 124 on I-57
Lawrence		263.0	423.3	AR 231 north to AR 34 – O'Kean	Southern terminus of AR 231
Greene	Light	265.6	427.4	US 412B – Light	
Greene	Light	266.7	429.2	AR 228 – Light, Sedgwick	
Greene	Light	268.2	431.6	US 412B – Light	
Greene		271.2	436.5	AR 141 – Walcott, Jonesboro	
Greene		272.5	438.5	AR 168 – Crowley's Ridge State Park	Eastern terminus of AR 168
Greene	Paragould	276.5	445.0	US 412B east	
Greene	Paragould	279.7	450.1	AR 358	
Greene	Paragould	281.7	453.4	US 49 – Jonesboro, Marmaduke	
Greene	Paragould	282.2	454.2	AR 69	
Greene	Paragould	284.1	457.2	US 412B west (AR 135 north) – Walnut Ridge	Western end of AR 135 concurrency
Greene	Paragould	284.7	458.2	AR 135 south – Lake City	Eastern end of AR 135 concurrency
Greene		289.4	465.7	AR 139 north – Piggott	Southern terminus of AR 139
Greene		290.2	467.0	US 412 east – Kennett	Continuation into Missouri
1.000 mi = 1.609 km; 1.000 km = 0.621 mi: Concurrency terminus; Proposed
