= Arkansas Highway 374 =

State highway in Arkansas, United States

Highway 374

Route information
- Maintained by ArDOT

Section 1
- Length: 7.33 mi (11.80 km)
- West end: AR 7 near Jasper
- East end: AR 74 / AR 123 near Vendor

Section 2
- Length: 2.74 mi (4.41 km)
- West end: CR 18 in St. Joe
- Major intersections: US 65 near St. Joe
- East end: CR 28 near St. Joe

Location
- Country: United States
- State: Arkansas
- Counties: Newton, Searcy

Highway system
- Arkansas Highway System; Interstate; US; State; Business; Spurs; Suffixed; Scenic; Heritage
← AR 372	→ AR 375

Arkansas Highway 374 (AR 374) is the designation for multiple state highways in Arkansas.

== Section 1 ==
Section 1 of AR 374 is a state highway of 7.33-mile-length (11.80 km) that runs in Newton County. It serves as a connector from AR 7 to AR 74/AR 123 near Vendor. It does not cross or run concurrent with any other state highways.

== Sections 3 and 4 ==
Sections 3 and 4 of AR 374 are two state highways totaling 2.74 miles (4.41 km) in length that run in Searcy County. Section 3 runs from Searcy County Route 18 in the town of St. Joe to U.S. Route 65, a total of 0.85 miles (1.37 km). Section 4 runs for 1.89 miles (3.04 km) from US 65 to CR 28 northeast of St. Joe. Typically, concurrencies are not signed along Arkansas State Highways though signage at both US 65 intersections show AR 374 continuing along the 0.3-mile-long (0.48 km) segment of US 65 connecting the two sections.

== Junction list ==
County	Location	mi	km	Destinations	Notes
Newton		0.00	0.00	AR 7 – Russellville, Jasper, Harrison	
Newton	Vendor	7.33	11.80	AR 74 / AR 123	
Gap in route
Searcy	St. Joe	0.00	0.00	CR 18 (South Woodlum Road)	To Buffalo National River Baker Ford and Woodlum Access
Searcy		0.85	1.37	US 65 – Harrison, Marshall	
Searcy	Gap in route				
Searcy		0.00	0.00	US 65 – Harrison, Marshall	
Searcy		1.89	3.04	CR 28	
1.000 mi = 1.609 km; 1.000 km = 0.621 mi
