= Arkansas Highway 292 =

State highway in Arkansas, United States

Highway 292

Route information
- Maintained by AHTD
- Length: 3.78 mi (6.08 km)

Major junctions
- West end: AR 21 in Ludwig
- East end: AR 123 / AR 164 near Ludwig

Location
- Country: United States
- State: Arkansas
- Counties: Johnson

Highway system
- Arkansas Highway System; Interstate; US; State; Business; Spurs; Suffixed; Scenic; Heritage
← AR 291	→ AR 293

Arkansas Highway 292 (AR 292, Hwy. 292) is an east–west state highway in Johnson County. The route runs 3.87 miles (6.23 km) from Arkansas Highway 21 east to Highway 123/Highway 164 near Hagarville. The route does not run concurrent with any other state highways.

== Route description ==
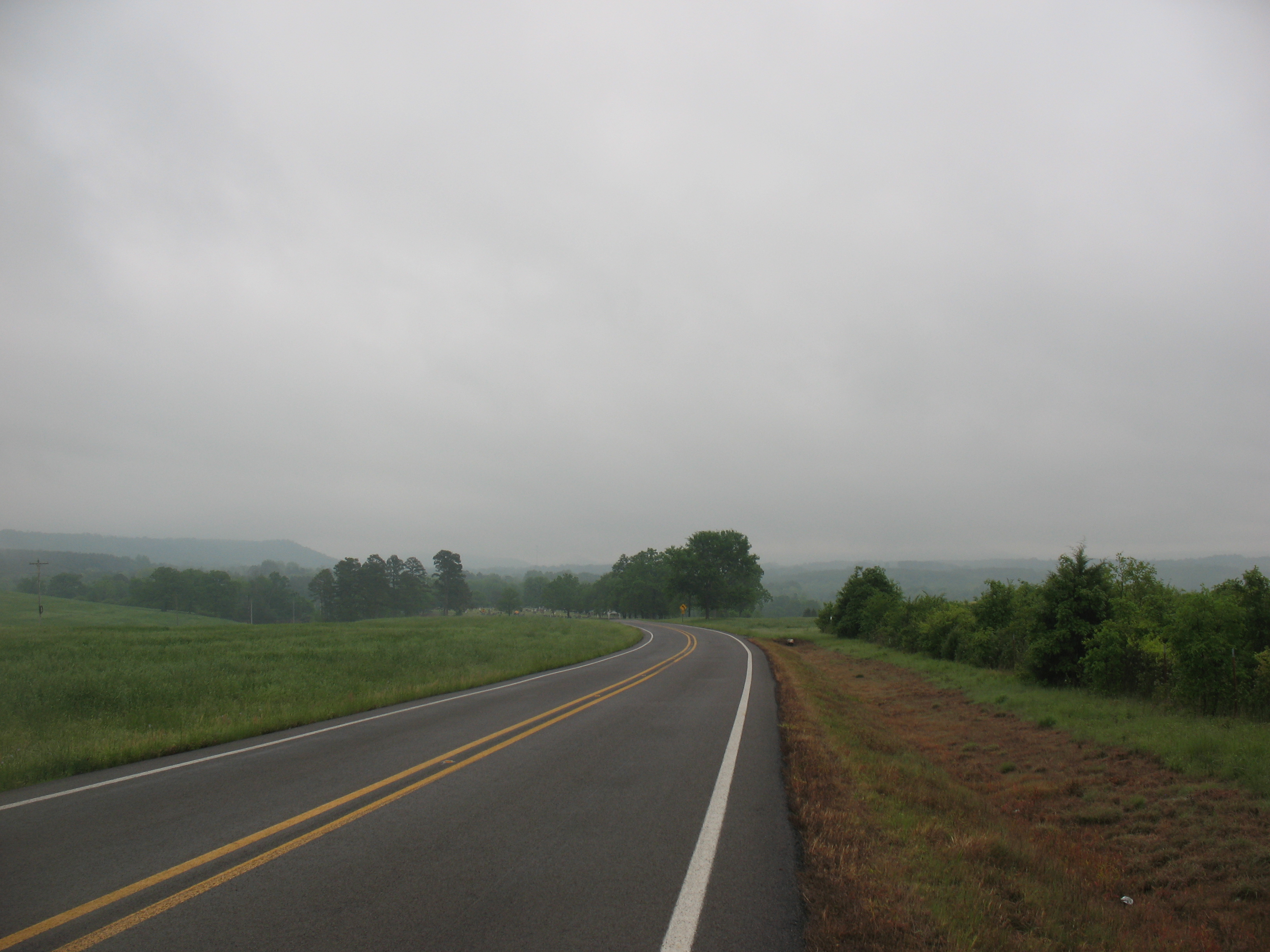
AR 292 near its eastern terminus

The route begins at Highway 21 north of Clarksville at Ludwig and runs due east. After 1 mile (1.6 km), the highway intersects Highway 818 and continues east before ending at Highway 123/Highway 164 near Hagarville.

== Major intersections ==
The entire route is in Johnson County.

Location	mi	km	Destinations	Notes
Ludwig	0.0	0.0	AR 21 – Clarksville, Ozone	western terminus
	1.27	2.04	AR 818	
	3.78	6.08	AR 123 / AR 164	eastern terminus
1.000 mi = 1.609 km; 1.000 km = 0.621 mi
