= Thomas J. Hankins House =

Historic house in Arkansas, United States

- U.S. National Register of Historic Places
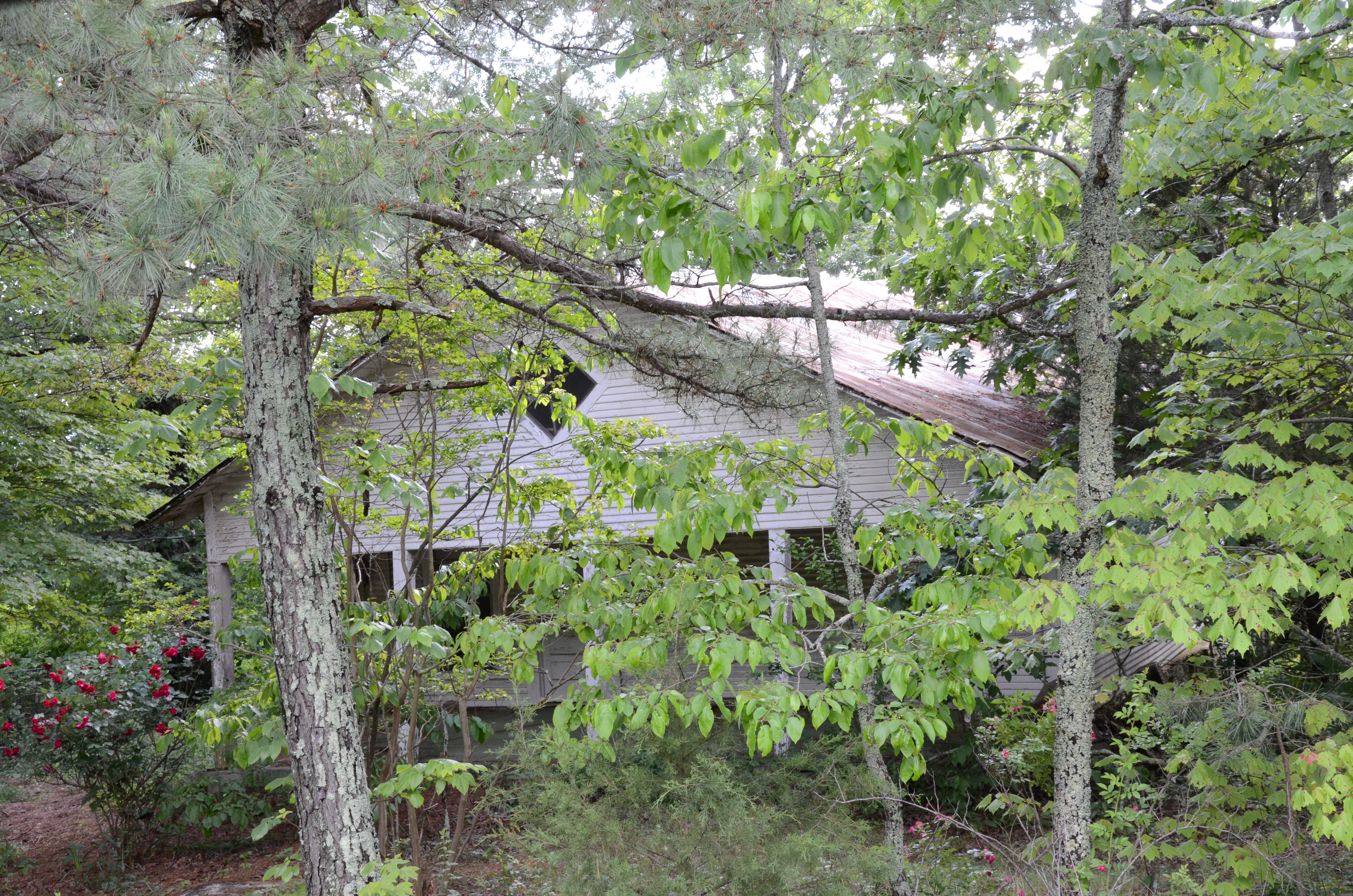

- Location within Arkansas Location within the United States
- Location: W. side of AR 7 approx. 375 ft. N. of jct. with AR 123, Pelsor, Arkansas
- Coordinates: 35°43′19″N 93°5′47″W
- Area: less than one acre
- Built: 1929
- Architectural style: Craftsman
- NRHP reference No.: 13000788
- Added to NRHP: September 30, 2013

The Thomas J. Hankins House is a historic house in the crossroads hamlet of Sand Gap in far northern Pope County, Arkansas. It is located about 375 feet (114 m) north of the junction of Arkansas Highways 123 and 7, on the west side of Highway 7. It is a single-story wood-frame structure, with a gabled roof, novelty siding, and stone foundation. The roof, its gable end facing front, extends over the front porch, supported by square posts, and there is a square diamond window in the gable center. Built in 1929, it is good local example of vernacular Craftsman design.

The house was listed on the National Register of Historic Places in 2013.

== See also ==
- National Register of Historic Places listings in Pope County, Arkansas
