= Arkansas Highway 43 =

State highway in Arkansas, United States

Highway 43

Route information
- Maintained by ArDOT
- Existed: 1926–present

Section 1
- South end: AR 264 in Siloam Springs
- Major intersections: AR 12 near Cherokee City; AR 102 near Maysville; AR 72 in Maysville; SH-20 at the Oklahoma state line near Maysville
- North end: Route 43 / SH-20 at the Oklahoma–Missouri state tripoint near Southwest City, MO

Section 2
- Length: 29.5 mi (47.5 km)
- South end: AR 21 at Boxley
- Major intersections: AR 74 in Ponca; AR 103 near Compton; AR 397 near Capps
- North end: AR 7 in Harrison

Section 3
- Length: 1.8 mi (2.9 km)
- South end: US 62 / US 65 / US 412 in Harrison
- North end: AR 7 in Harrison

Location
- Country: United States
- State: Arkansas
- Counties: Benton, Delaware (OK), Newton, Boone

Highway system
- Arkansas Highway System; Interstate; US; State; Business; Spurs; Suffixed; Scenic; Heritage
← AR 42	→ AR 44

Arkansas Highway 43 (AR 43) is a designation for three state highways in Arkansas, United States. One segment runs from Highway 264 in Siloam Springs north to the Missouri state line. A second segment of 29.5 miles (47.5 km) runs from Highway 21 at Boxley north to Highway 7 in Harrison. A third segment runs 1.8 miles (2.9 km) in Harrison from U.S. Route 65 (US 65) east to Highway 7.

== Route description ==
=== Siloam Springs to Missouri ===
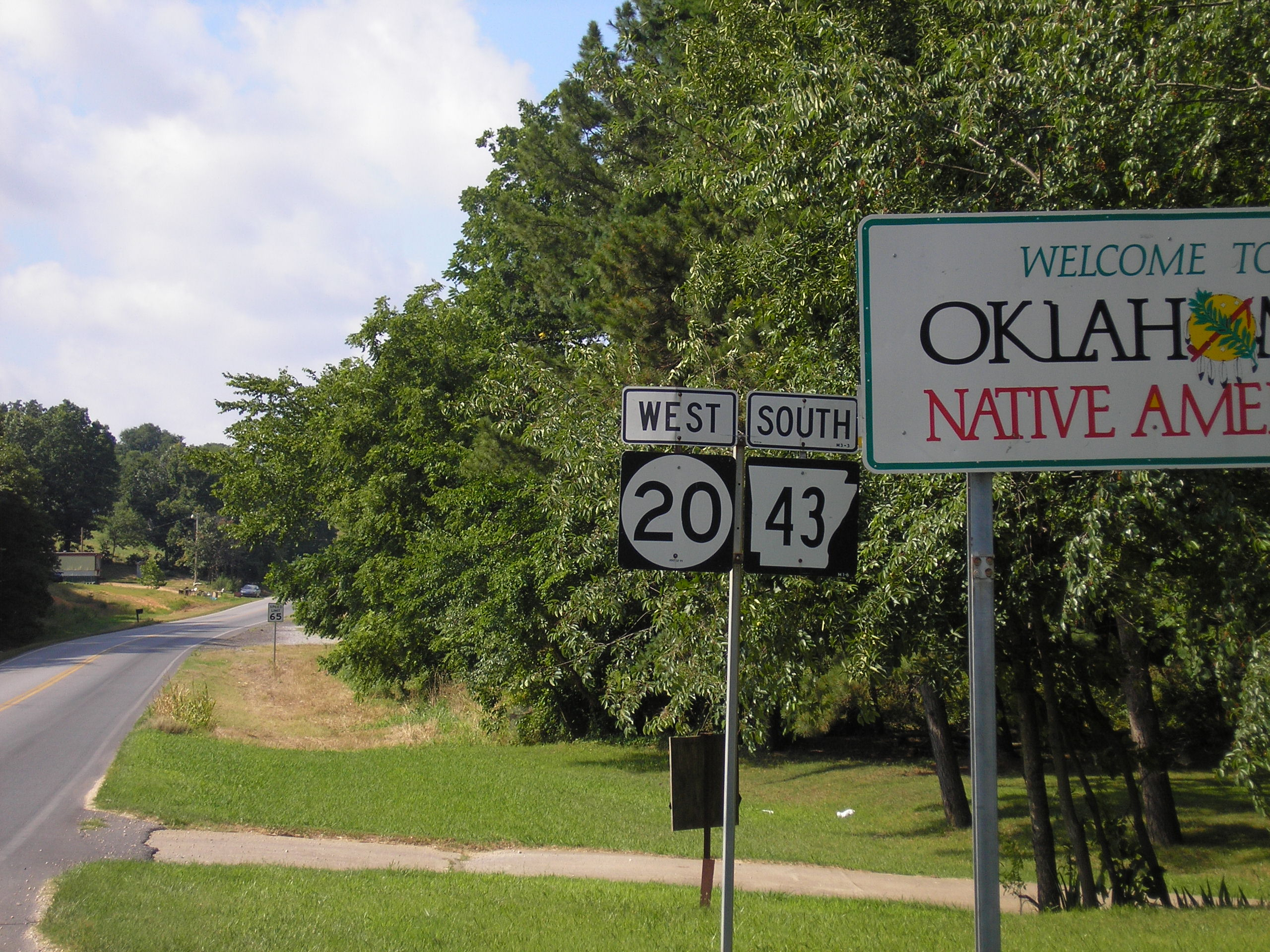
Northern end of Highway 43; eastern end of OK-20

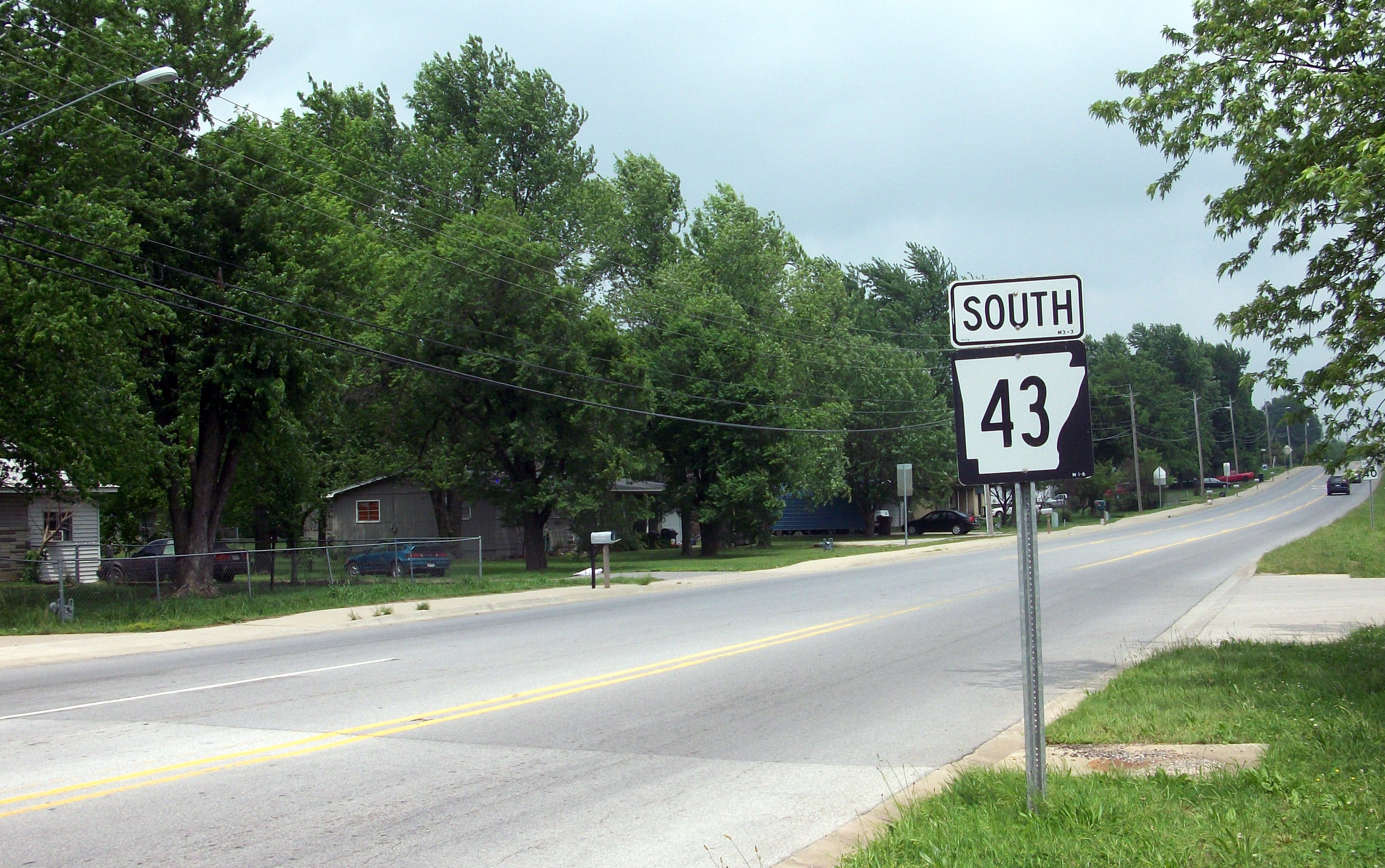
Highway 43 in Siloam Springs

Highway 43 begins at Highway 264 in Siloam Springs and runs west before turning north and running close to the Oklahoma state line. The route runs through Cherokee City before meeting Highway 102 and later Highway 72 in Maysville.

After Maysville, Highway 43 runs along the Oklahoma state line concurrent with OK-20. This continues for approximately 5.4 miles (8.7 km) until both routes terminate at the Missouri state line, where they continue as Missouri Route 43. This section is jointly maintained by the Arkansas Department of Transportation (ArDOT) and the Oklahoma Department of Transportation (ODOT).

For the northernmost few miles of the overlapping stretch of road, AR 43/SH-20 turns toward the west, no longer straddling the state line. For those few miles, Highway 43 is located wholly within the state of Oklahoma but is not apparent to the traveler. The northernmost few feet of AR 43/SH-20 are completely in Arkansas, as the Arkansas/Missouri/Oklahoma tripoint is on the west side of the highway.

=== Boxley to Harrison ===
The route begins at Highway 21 at Boxley, and runs north near the Buffalo National River. Highway 43 enters Boone County and serves as the western terminus of Highway 206, and the southern terminus of Highway 397. The route terminates at Highway 7 in south Harrison. Highway 43 runs for 15.9 miles (25.6 km) in Newton County and 14.1 miles (22.7 km) in Boone County.

== Major intersections ==
County	Location	mi	km	Destinations	Notes
Benton	Siloam Springs	0.0	0.0	AR 264 (Lincoln Street)	Southern terminus
Benton		8.0	12.9	AR 12 – Colcord, OK, Gentry	
Benton		16.3	26.2	AR 102 east – Decatur	Western terminus of AR 102
Benton	Maysville	18.7	30.1	AR 72 east – Gravette	Western terminus of AR 72
Delaware–Benton county line				SH-20 west – Jay	Southern end of SH-20 concurrency
Delaware–McDonald– Benton county tripoint	OKARMO Corner			Route 43 north – Southwest City	Continuation into Missouri; eastern terminus of SH-20 and AR 43
Gap in route
Newton	Boxley	0.0	0.0	AR 21 to AR 16 – Kingston	Southern terminus
Newton	Ponca			AR 74 east – Jasper	Western terminus of AR 74
Newton				AR 103 north – Osage	Southern terminus of AR 103
Boone				AR 206 east – Gaither	Western terminus of AR 206
Boone				AR 397 north	Southern terminus of AR 397
Boone	Harrison	29.5	47.5	AR 7	Northern terminus
Boone	Harrison	Gap in route			
Boone	Harrison	0.0	0.0	US 62 / US 65 / US 412 – Little Rock, Eureka Springs, Branson, MO	Southern terminus
Boone	Harrison	1.8	2.9	AR 7 – Diamond City, Jasper	Northern terminus
1.000 mi = 1.609 km; 1.000 km = 0.621 mi: Concurrency terminus

== History ==
Highway 43 was created in the 1926 Arkansas state highway numbering. The original route was designated as State Road 43 between Boxley and Missouri. The route was truncated at State Road 14 at Lead Hill in 1929. The segment between Lead Hill and Harrison was re-signed as Highway 7 in October 1953 following highway reconstruction. Minor relocations also took place around Lead Hill following construction of Bull Shoals Lake in 1954.

The Arkansas State Highway Commission created a second segment of Highway 43 in Harrison on August 25, 1965.

The Arkansas State Highway Commission created a third segment of Highway 43 on October 27, 1971 following a request from the Siloam Springs Chamber of Commerce to provide consistent numbering between Siloam Springs and Joplin, Missouri by renumbering Highway 99 to match Missouri Route 43.

The new segment was rerouted within Siloam Springs as part of a reorganization of the city's highways on July 17, 1996. The Highway Commission relocated the Highway 43 southern terminus from US 412 to Highway 59 by turning over Mount Olive Street to city maintenance and rerouted Highway 43 over the former Highway 204 (Cheri Whitlock Drive) in exchange for street and drainage improvements along Mount Olive Street.

=== Siloam Springs spur ===
Highway 43S
- Location: Siloam Springs
- Length: 1.01 mi (1.63 km)
- Existed: July 17, 1996

Arkansas Highway 43 Spur (AR 43S and Hwy. 43S) is a former spur route of 1.01 miles (1.63 km) in Siloam Springs. It was decommissioned when AR 43 was rerouted along AR 204.
