= Arkansas Highway 103 =

State highway in Arkansas, United States

Highway 103

Route information
- Maintained by ArDOT
- Existed: c. 1928–present

Section 1
- Length: 23.370 mi (37.610 km)
- South end: Marina Rd./Lakeview Dr. in Clarksville
- North end: AR 215

Section 2
- Length: 35.281 mi (56.779 km)
- South end: AR 43 at the Buffalo National River
- North end: AR 21 at Oak Grove

Location
- Country: United States
- State: Arkansas
- Counties: Johnson, Newton, Carroll

Highway system
- Arkansas Highway System; Interstate; US; State; Business; Spurs; Suffixed; Scenic; Heritage
← AR 102	→ AR 104

Highway 103 (AR 103, Ark. 103, and Hwy. 103) is a designation for two north–south state highways in Arkansas. One segment begins in Clarksville in the Arkansas River Valley and runs north to the Ozark National Forest. A second route runs through a sparsely populated segment of the Ozark Mountains between the Buffalo National River and Highway 21 near the Missouri state line.

The northern segment was created in 1928 and was designated as Arkansas Highway 21E (AR 21E) in the 1950s. Upon restoration as AR 103, the route saw extensions in 1957, 1960, and 1973. The second segment began as AR 123 in 1926 but was renumbered to AR 103 in a 1937 swap. This route was extended in the 1940s, 1963, and 1965. Both routes are maintained by the Arkansas Department of Transportation (ArDOT).

== Route description ==
ArDOT maintains both segments of AR 103 as part of the state highway system. Excluding concurrencies, the highest traffic of either segment was immediately north of I-40 in Clarksville, estimated at 14,000 vehicles per day on average in 2021, dropping as it travels north, including 5,000 VPD on the University of the Ozarks campus to 740 north of Harmony. The northern segment was estimated at 280 VPD in rural Newton County, with counts peaking north of Green Forest at 1600 VPD in 2021. For reference, roads under 400 VPD are classified as "very low volume local road" by the American Association of State Highway and Transportation Officials (AASHTO).

No segment of AR 103 is part of the National Highway System (NHS), a network of roads important to the nation's economy, defense, and mobility.

=== Clarksville to Ozark National Forest ===
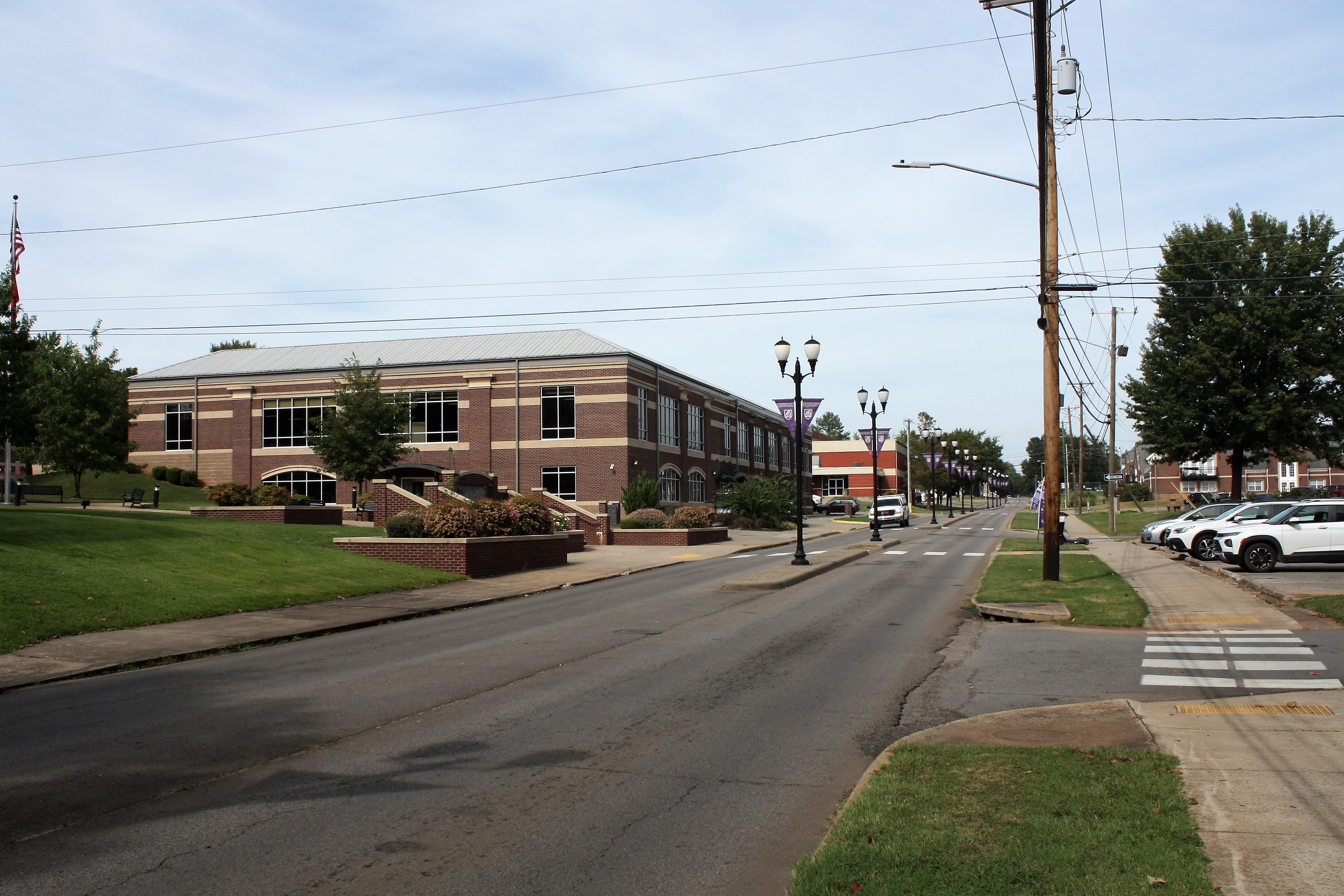
Highway 103 runs north through the University of the Ozarks campus in Clarksville

Highway 103 begins at the intersection of Lakeview Drive as Marina Road in Clarksville near the Spadra Creek Use Area along the Arkansas River. The route runs east then turns north to cross Interstate 40 (I-40) at exit 58. Now entering the central part of the city, Highway 103 becomes Rogers Avenue and has an intersection with Highway 123 before meeting US Highway 64 in downtown Clarksville. Now forming a 0.42 miles (0.68 km) concurrency westbound with US 64, the highways pass the Dunlap House and Johnson County Courthouse, both listed on the National Register of Historic Places (NRHP). The concurrency ends when Highway 103 turns north and becomes College Avenue. Highway 103 passes the historic First Presbyterian Church before entering the University of the Ozarks campus, with the majority of the campus buildings including the historic Clarksville National Guard Armory and Munger-Wilson Memorial Chapel located on the west side of the highway. Following the university, Highway 103 exits Clarksville and heads northwest to Harmony through sparsely populated forested land.

Harmony brings an intersection with Highway 164 near the Harmony Presbyterian Church before turning north and entering the Ozark National Forest, administrated by the United States Forest Service. The highway winds slowly through the dense forest, including hairpin turns, crossing the Mulberry River, a National Wild and Scenic River before an intersection with Highway 215, where the highway terminates.

=== Buffalo River to Oak Grove ===
Highway 103 begins on the border of the National Park Service's Buffalo National River at Highway 43 in Newton County near Ponca. The highway runs north into Carroll County to Osage and passes Stamps Store before forming a concurrency with US 412 to the west. Following this overlap, Highway 103 runs north through Conner and Rule before forming a concurrency with US 62 in Green Forest. The highway turns north, ending this concurrency near the historic Green Forest Water Tower after which the route continues north through unincorporated areas to terminate at Highway 21 in Oak Grove near the Missouri state line.

== History ==
Historic shields for the route

The first designation of Highway 103 was created during the original 1926 Arkansas state highway numbering between Lurton and Western Grove. By the September 1, 1928 map, a second segment of AR 103 was created between Green Forest and Oak Grove. In 1937, the segment between Lurton and Western Grove switched numbers with Highway 123, which ran between Clarksville to the Ozark National Forest boundary south of Oark. Around 1945, the route was extended north to Oark. (Note: Per illegible handwritten note on 1936-1939 Johnson County map.)

Between 1950 and 1955, the segment between Green Forest and Oak Grove was designated AR 21E. The Arkansas General Assembly passed the Act 148 of 1957, the Milum Road Act, creating 10–12 miles (16–19 km) of new state highways in each county. In response to the act, the Arkansas State Highway Commission extended the AR 103 designation south from Green Forest to Rule on July 10, 1957. On June 29, 1960, the Highway Commission extended the designation south to AR 68 (now US 412) at Osage, but changed the routing to run from Rule to AR 68 at Gobbler instead two months later.

On April 24, 1963, the highway was extended south to Jamestown, an area which has since been annexed into Clarksville. The designation was extended south once more on June 23, 1965, to the current southern terminus at Lakeview Drive.

A third segment of AR 103 was created pursuant to Act 9 of 1973, which directed county judges and legislators to designate up to 12 miles (19 km) of county roads as state highways in each county. Though initially running from AR 43 to the Newton/Carroll County line, the roadway was extended into Carroll County to AR 68 the following month, thus combining the new segment with the previously extant highway from Gobbler to Oak Grove.

== Major intersections ==
Mile markers reset at some concurrencies.

County	Location	mi	km	Destinations	Notes
Johnson	Clarksville	0.000	0.000	End state maintenance at Lakeview Road	Southern terminus
Johnson	Clarksville	1.39	2.24	I-40 – Little Rock, Fort Smith	exit 58
Johnson	Clarksville	2.56	4.12	AR 123 (Poplar St)	AR 123 southern terminus
Johnson	Clarksville	3.004– 0.000	4.834– 0.000	US 64 (Main St)	
Johnson	Harmony	8.54	13.74	AR 164 west – Horsehead Lake Public Fishing	AR 164 eastern terminus
Johnson		20.04	32.25	Bridge over the Mulberry River	
Johnson		20.366	32.776	AR 215	Northern terminus
Gap in route
Newton	Buffalo National River	0.000	0.000	AR 43 – Ponca, Harrison	Southern terminus
Carroll		11.901– 0.000	19.153– 0.000	US 412 – Huntsville, Alpena	
Carroll	Green Forest	13.11– 0.000	21.10– 0.000	US 62 (Main Street) – Berryville, Green Forest	
Carroll	Oak Grove	10.270	16.528	AR 21 – Berryville, Blue Eye	Northern terminus
1.000 mi = 1.609 km; 1.000 km = 0.621 mi: Concurrency terminus

== See also ==
- List of state highways in Arkansas
