= Big Piney Creek Bridge =

- U.S. National Register of Historic Places
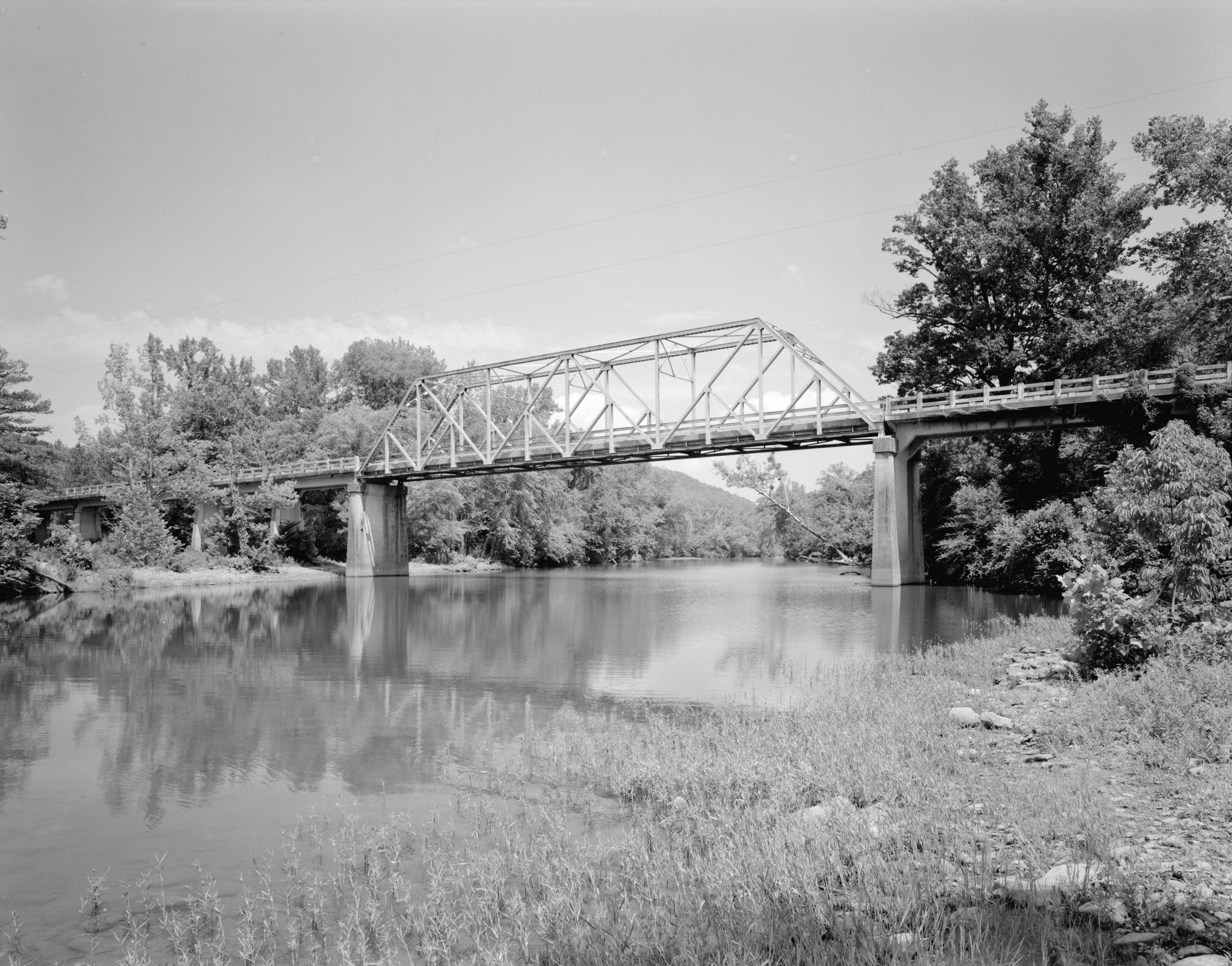
- HAER photo, 1988

- Location within Arkansas Location within the United States
- Location: AR 123, northeast of Hagersville, Arkansas
- Coordinates: 35°40′38″N 93°14′07″W
- Area: less than one acre
- Built: 1931
- Built by: Fred Luttjohann
- Architect: Arkansas Highway & Transportation
- Architectural style: Warren through truss
- MPS: Historic Bridges of Arkansas MPS
- NRHP reference No.: 90000506
- Added to NRHP: April 9, 1990

The Big Piney Creek Bridge is a historic bridge, carrying Arkansas Highway 123 across Big Piney Creek in Ozark-St. Francis National Forest, northeast of Hagarville, Arkansas. Its main span is a Warren through truss structure, 141 feet (43 m) in length, with steel deck girder approach spans giving the bridge a total length of 461 feet (141 m). The trusses are mounted on concrete piers. The bridge was built in 1931, during a period of financial hardship, and was for economic reasons built with a single-lane 12-foot (3.7 m) roadway.

The bridge was listed on the National Register of Historic Places in 1990.

== See also ==
- List of bridges documented by the Historic American Engineering Record in Arkansas
- List of bridges on the National Register of Historic Places in Arkansas
- National Register of Historic Places listings in Johnson County, Arkansas
