= Bass, Arkansas =

- Unincorporated community
- Location within Arkansas Location within the United States
- Coordinates: 35°54′15″N 92°59′53″W
- Country: United States
- State: Arkansas
- County: Newton
- Elevation: 876 ft (267 m)
- Time zone: UTC-6 (Central (CST))
  - Summer (DST): UTC-5 (CDT)
- Area code: 870
- GNIS feature ID: 70527

Bass is an unincorporated community in Newton County, Arkansas, United States. Bass is located on Arkansas Highway 74, 13 miles (21 km) southeast of Jasper.
