= Lake Dardanelle State Park =

State park in Arkansas, United States

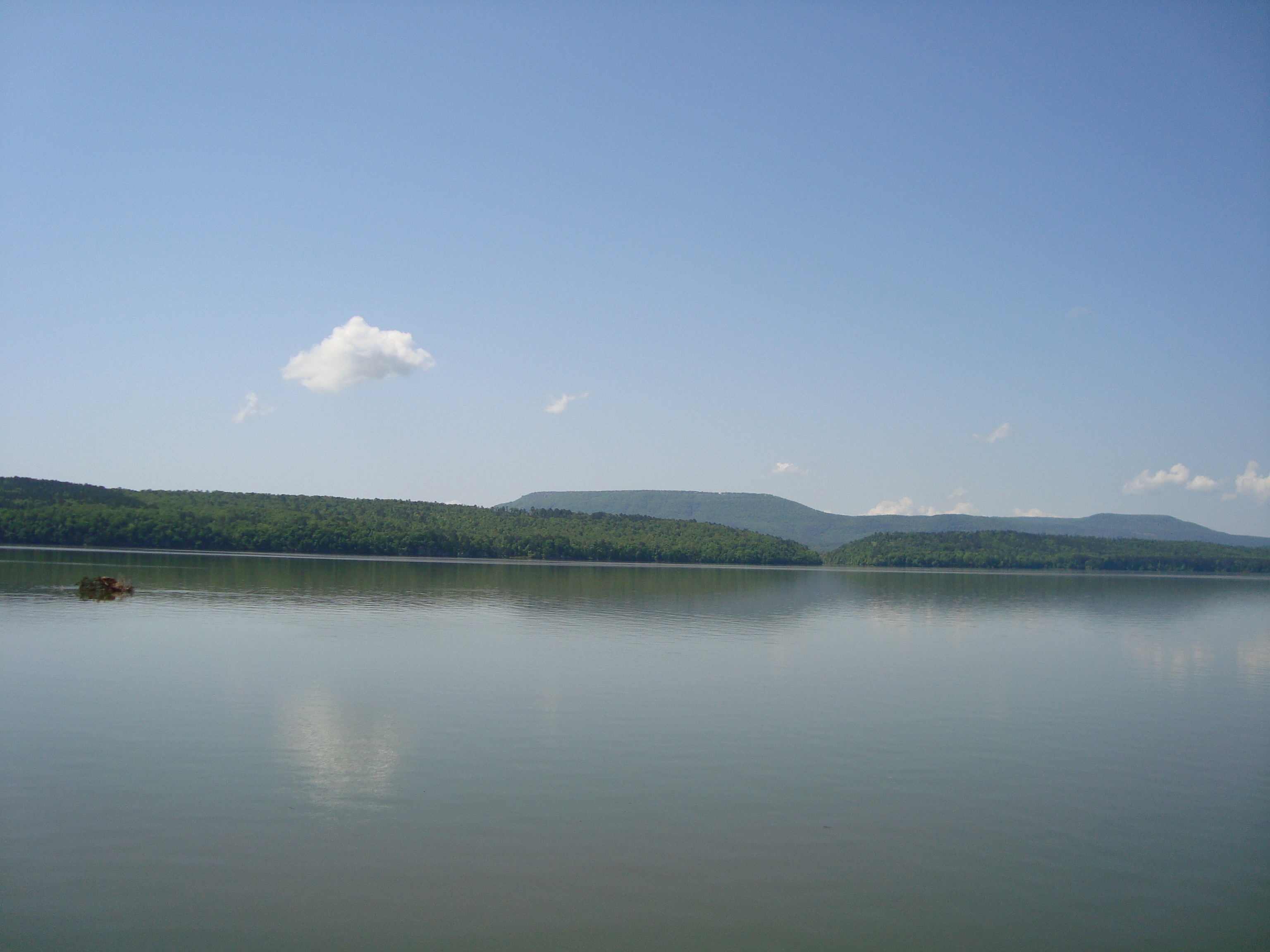

- Location within Arkansas Location within the United States
- Interactive map of Lake Dardanelle State Park
- Location: Russellville and Dardanelle, Arkansas, United States
- Coordinates: 35°16′59″N 93°12′11″W
- Area: 246 acres (100 ha)
- Established: 1966
- Administrator: Arkansas Department of Parks, Heritage and Tourism
- Website: Official website
- Arkansas State Parks

Lake Dardanelle State Park is located on two sites on the lake, one in Russellville, Arkansas and one in Dardanelle, Arkansas, on the 34,300-acre Lake Dardanelle. Both sites include picnic facilities, boat ramps, pavilions, playgrounds and dump stations.

The Russellville Area site features a 10,257 square feet (952.9 m^{2}) visitor center with six aquariums, (Note: These contain fish from the Arkansas River and the lake, as well as from its tributaries Piney Creek and the Illinois Bayou.) natural and cultural history displays, classrooms and a gift shop. There is a1,861 square feet (172.9 m^{2}) fishing tournament weigh-in pavilion that is used for the many fishing tournaments held at the park. Nearby, there is a covered, barrier-free fishing pier. There are 74 campsites and an outdoor amphitheater. The Dardanelle Area site features 18 camp sites.

The park's staff offer many interpretive programs, including guided hikes, nature talks, kayaking, lake tours and demonstrations, evening slide shows and movies.
