= Lake Dardanelle =

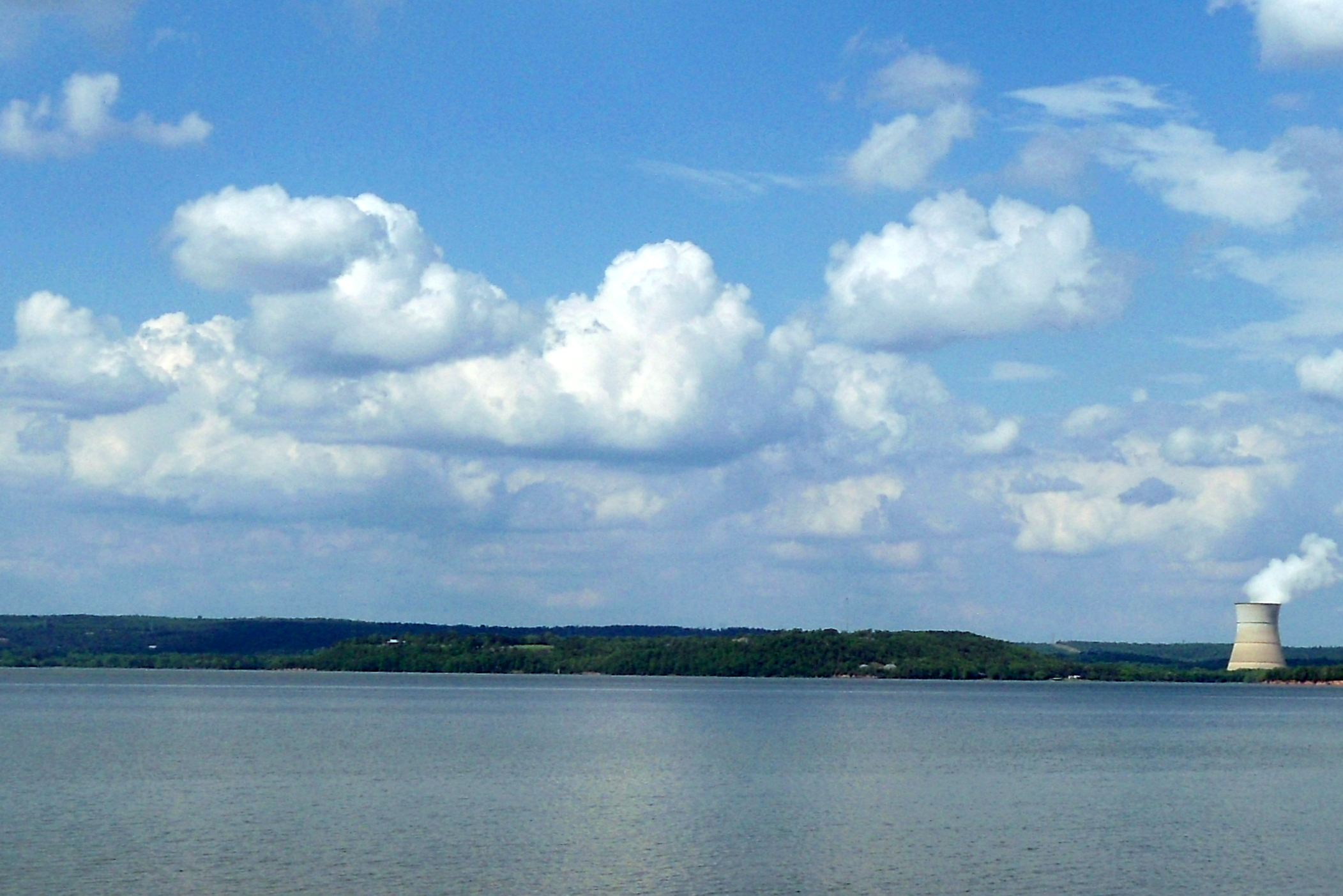
- Lake Dardanelle, looking northeast from State Highway 22 near Delaware in 2013.

- Location within Arkansas
- Location: Arkansas
- Coordinates: 35°20′24″N 93°20′15″W
- Type: reservoir
- Primary inflows: Arkansas River
- Primary outflows: Arkansas River
- Basin countries: United States
- Max. length: 50 miles (80 km)
- Surface area: 40,000 acres (160 km^{2})
- Shore length^{1}: 315 mi (510 km)
- Surface elevation: 338 ft (103 m)
- Settlements: Dardanelle, Arkansas
- ^{1} Shore length is not a well-defined measure.

Lake Dardanelle is a major reservoir on the Arkansas River in Arkansas, USA. and is an integral part of the McClellan-Kerr Arkansas River Navigation System (MKARNS), which allows barge transportation from the Mississippi River to the Tulsa Port of Catoosa in northeastern Oklahoma. MKARNS went into service along its full length in 1971.

== Lake description ==
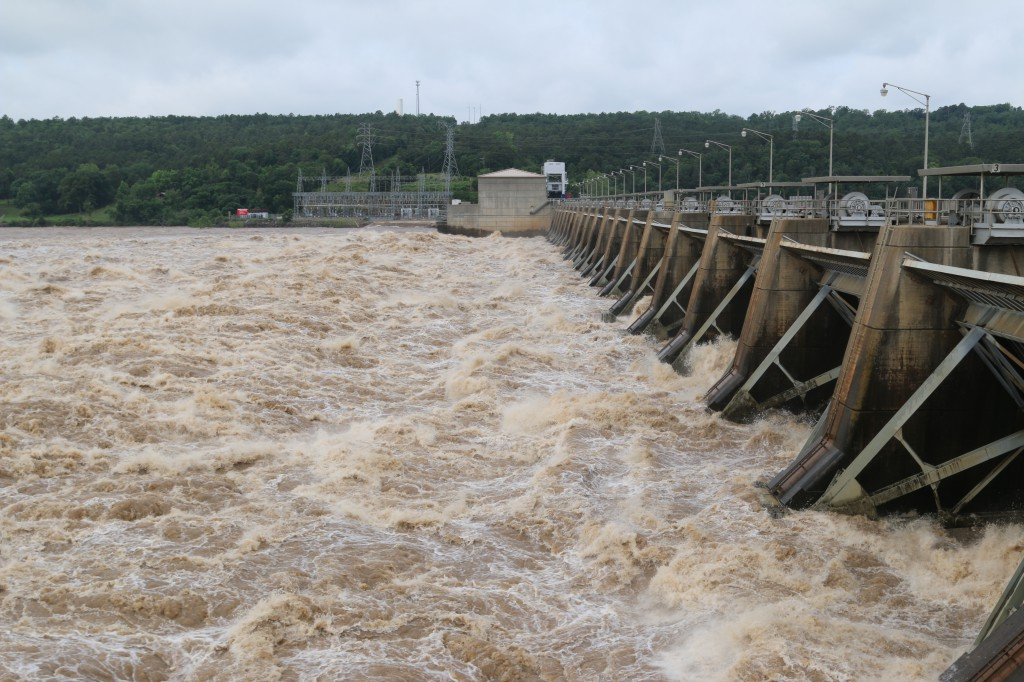
Dardanelle Lock and Dam (Lock 10), 2015

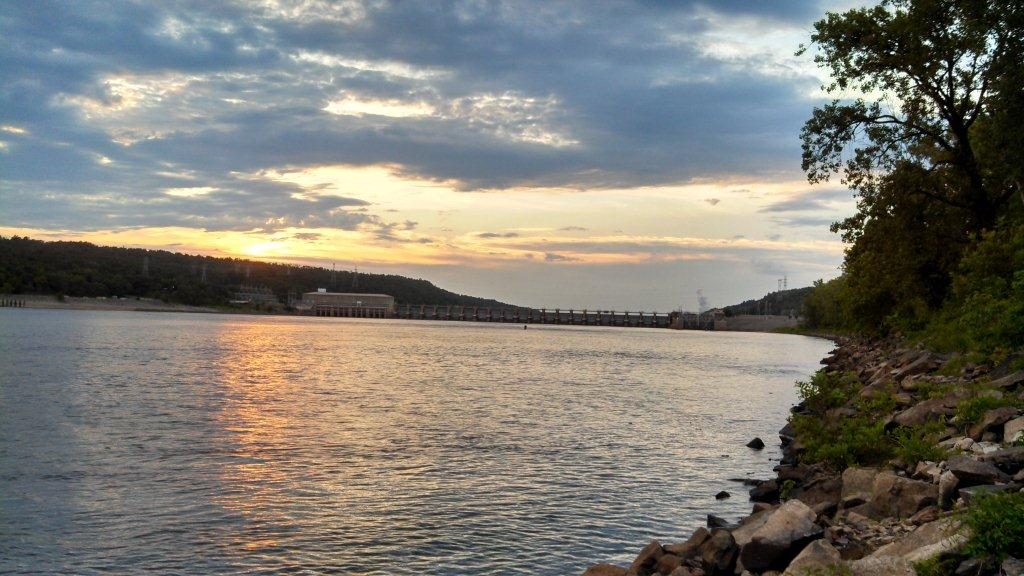
Sunset on Dardanelle Lock and Dam

Lake Dardanelle, a reservoir on the Arkansas River, provides many recreational opportunities. The lake covers nearly 40,000 acres (160 km^{2}) with abundant opportunities for boating, fishing, picnicking, camping and scenic views. The lake extends from Dardanelle Lock and Dam (35°14′57″N 93°10′14″W) near Dardanelle, into Pope, Yell, Logan, Johnson and Franklin Counties. The lake reaches 50 mi (80 km) upstream the Arkansas River and has 315 mi (510 km) of shoreline. Each recreational park on Dardanelle has drinking water, picnic tables and toilet facilities. Most have trailer dump stations, boat launch ramps and electrical sites.

The only nuclear power plant in Arkansas, Arkansas Nuclear One, is located on the northeastern shore of Lake Dardanelle.

Mount Nebo (Arkansas) is close to the area and provides scenic views for visitors along the lake. The Ozark and Ouachita Mountains also offer great scenery and have mountain springs and recreation parks in abundance. The mountains of the Ozarks and Ouachitas are abundant in wildlife. The bald eagle often uses this area for wintering. Eagles can be seen here from late fall to early spring.

Lake Dardanelle State Park is located on two sites, one in Russellville and the other, across the lake to the south, near Dardanelle. The Russellville park includes a visitor center with aquariums and natural and cultural history displays, a fishing pier, and a fishing tournament weigh-in pavilion that is used for the many fishing tournaments held on the lake. Both sites offer campsites, boat launch ramps, standard pavilions, picnic sites, playgrounds and bathhouses.

== See also ==
- List of Arkansas dams and reservoirs
