= Moreland, Arkansas =

- Unincorporated community
- Moreland's position in Arkansas. Moreland, Arkansas (the United States)
- Coordinates: 35°22′03″N 92°55′59″W
- Country: United States
- State: Arkansas
- County: Pope
- Elevation: 748 ft (228 m)
- Time zone: UTC-6 (Central (CST))
  - Summer (DST): UTC-5 (CDT)
- GNIS feature ID: 77688

Moreland is an unincorporated community in Moreland Township, Pope County, Arkansas, United States.

Moreland was known as "Cross Plains" or "Isbel Creek" before it was renamed "Moreland" after a stagecoach passenger observed that the community would need "more land".
