= Clarksville Municipal Airport =

Airport in Arkansas, United States

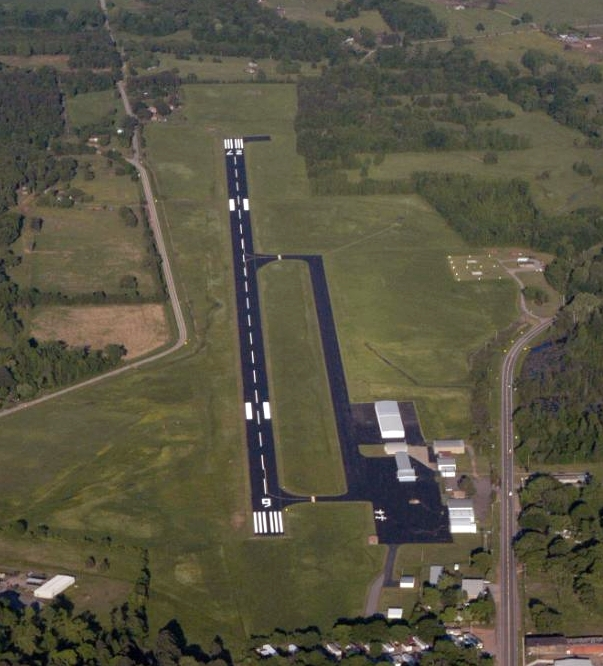
- IATA: none; ICAO: none; FAA LID: H35

Summary
- Airport type: Public
- Owner: City of Clarksville
- Serves: Clarksville, Arkansas
- Elevation AMSL: 481 ft (147 m)
- Coordinates: 35°28′14″N 093°25′38″W

Map
- Location of airport in Arkansas H35 (the United States)

Runways
Direction	Length		Surface
Direction	ft	m	Surface
9/27	5,050	1,374	Asphalt

Statistics (2010)
- Aircraft operations: 4,500
- Based aircraft: 14
- Source: Federal Aviation Administration

Clarksville Municipal Airport (FAA LID: H35) is a public-use airport located three nautical miles (3.5 mi, 5.6 km) east of the central business district of Clarksville, in Johnson County, Arkansas, United States. It is owned by the City of Clarksville.

This airport is included in the FAA's National Plan of Integrated Airport Systems for 2011–2015, which categorized it as a general aviation airport.

== Facilities and aircraft ==
Clarksville Municipal Airport covers an area of 151 acres (61 ha) at an elevation of 481 feet (147 m) above mean sea level. It has one runway designated 9/27 with an asphalt surface measuring 5,050 by 75 feet (1,374 x 23 m).

For the 12-month period ending November 30, 2010, the airport had 4,500 general aviation aircraft operations, an average of 12 per day. At that time there were 14 aircraft based at this airport: 86% single-engine, 7% multi-engine and 7% helicopter.

== See also ==
- List of airports in Arkansas
