= Ozark Highlands Trail =

Trail in Arkansas, U.S.

Coordinates: 35°43′22″N 93°30′29″W

- Length: 254 miles
- Use: Hiking

The Ozark Highlands Trail roams 254 miles (409 km) through parts of seven counties in northwest Arkansas. It stretches from Lake Fort Smith State Park, across the Ozark National Forest, to the Buffalo National River. The trail passes through some of the most remote and scenic portions of the Ozark Mountains, like the Hurricane Creek Wilderness Area. It also crosses White Rock Mountain, Hare Mountain, the Marinoni Scenic Area, and many other scenic spots.

There are long-term plans to connect the similarly named Ozark Trail in Missouri to the Ozark Highlands Trail in Arkansas, resulting in over 700 miles (1,100 km) of continuous trails through the Ozarks. The proposed route initially passed through 14 miles of wilderness area in the Buffalo National River park, and the National Park Service initially supported this route. However, they have since vetoed this proposed route.

The Ozark Highlands Trail is a popular hiking, backpacking, and thru-hiking route.
