= Scottsville, Arkansas =

- Unincorporated community
- Position in Arkansas
- Coordinates: 35°26′55″N 93°02′48″W
- Country: United States
- State: Arkansas
- County: Pope
- Elevation: 495 ft (151 m)
- Time zone: UTC-6 (Central (CST))
  - Summer (DST): UTC-5 (CDT)
- GNIS feature ID: 78306

Scottsville is an unincorporated community in Liberty Township, Pope County, Arkansas, United States. The community was named for the Scott family, and was named Rocky Point, The Level, and The Levey prior to Scottsville.
