= Sand Gap, Arkansas =

- Unincorporated community
- Position in Arkansas
- Coordinates: 35°43′15″N 93°05′46″W
- Country: United States
- State: Arkansas
- County: Pope
- Elevation: 1,962 ft (598 m)
- Time zone: UTC-6 (Central (CST))
  - Summer (DST): UTC-5 (CDT)
- GNIS feature ID: 78290

Sand Gap is an unincorporated community in Freeman Township, Pope County, Arkansas, United States. Sand Gap is located at the junction of Arkansas highways 7 and 16.

Sand Gap used to be known as Grand Gap. The official Arkansas town name is Pelsor. It contains Archeological Site 3PP614, which is listed on the National Register of Historic Places.
