= Ponca, Arkansas =

- Census-designated place
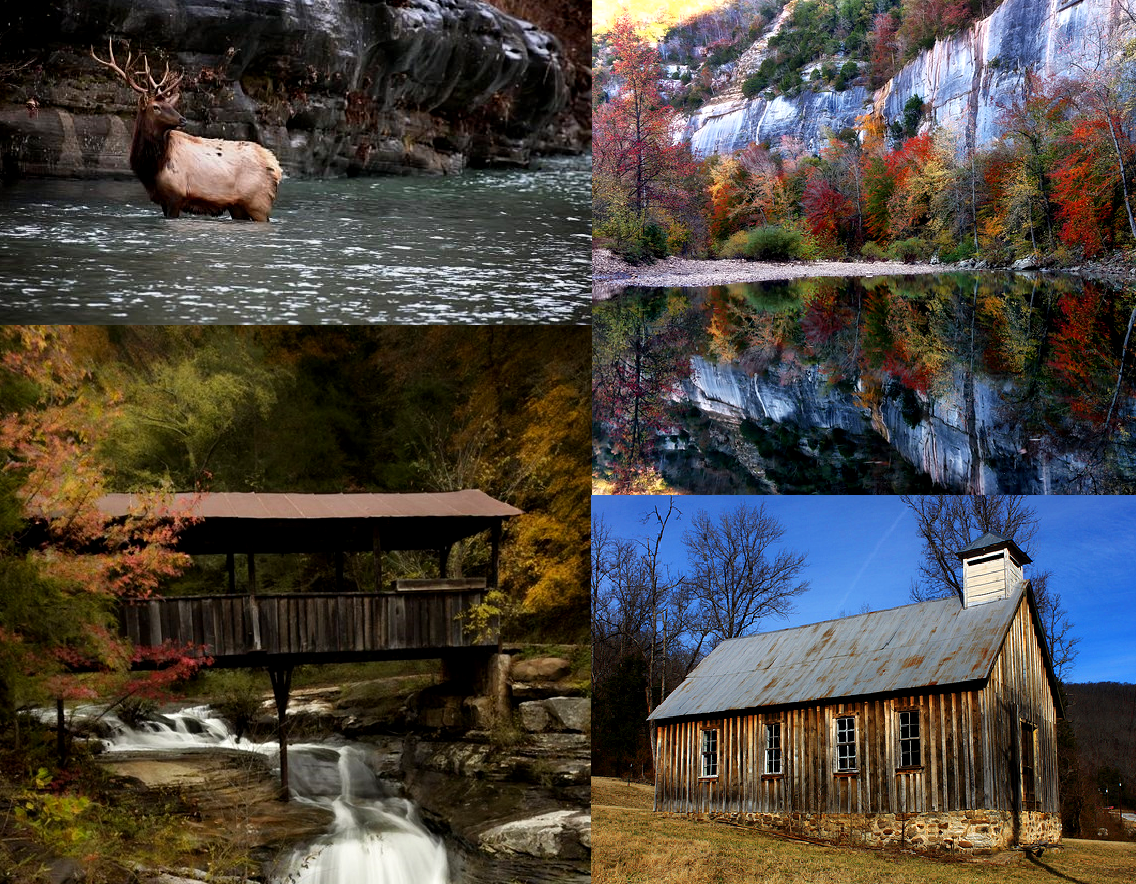

- Location within Arkansas Location within the United States
- Coordinates: 36°01′43″N 93°21′50″W
- Country: United States
- State: Arkansas
- County: Newton
- Elevation: 1,378 ft (420 m)

Population (2020)
  - Total: 30
- Time zone: UTC-6 (Central (CST))
  - Summer (DST): UTC-5 (CDT)
- ZIP code: 72670
- Area code: 870
- GNIS feature ID: 2805678

Ponca is an unincorporated community and census-designated place (CDP) in Newton County, Arkansas, United States. Ponca is located on Arkansas Highway 43, 10 miles (16 km) west of Jasper. Ponca has a post office with ZIP code 72670.

Per the 2020 census, the population was 30.

== Demographics ==
Historical population
Census	Pop.	Note	%±
2020	30		—
U.S. Decennial Census; 2020

=== 2020 census ===
Ponca CDP, Arkansas – Demographic Profile (NH = Non-Hispanic) Note: the US Census treats Hispanic/Latino as an ethnic category. This table excludes Latinos from the racial categories and assigns them to a separate category. Hispanics/Latinos may be of any race.
Race / Ethnicity	Pop 2020	% 2020
White alone (NH)	30	100.00%
Black or African American alone (NH)	0	0.00%
Native American or Alaska Native alone (NH)	0	0.00%
Asian alone (NH)	0	0.00%
Pacific Islander alone (NH)	0	0.00%
Some Other Race alone (NH)	0	0.00%
Mixed Race/Multi-Racial (NH)	0	0.00%
Hispanic or Latino (any race)	0	0.00%
Total	30	100.00%
