= Vendor, Arkansas =

Unincorporated community in Arkansas, US

Coordinates: 35°56′50″N 93°04′39″W

Vendor is an unincorporated community in Newton County, Arkansas, United States. The ZIP Code is 72683. It connects with Mt. Judea and Piercetown. Vendor's name is derived from the merchants who would stop and sell their wares by the road, according to local legend.
