= Hagarville, Arkansas =

- Census-designated place
- Location of Hagarville in Johnson County, Arkansas

- Location within Arkansas Location within the United States
- Coordinates: 35°30′54″N 93°20′01″W
- Country: United States
- State: Arkansas
- County: Johnson

Area
  - Total: 4.17 sq mi (10.79 km^{2})
  - Land: 4.14 sq mi (10.73 km^{2})
  - Water: 0.019 sq mi (0.05 km^{2})
- Elevation: 535 ft (163 m)

Population (2020)
  - Total: 142
  - Density: 34.3/sq mi (13.23/km^{2})
- Time zone: UTC-6 (Central (CST))
  - Summer (DST): UTC-5 (CDT)
- Area code: 479
- GNIS feature ID: 2612126

Hagarville is a census-designated place in Johnson County, Arkansas, United States. Per the 2020 census, the population was 142.

== Demographics ==
Historical population
Census	Pop.	Note	%±
2010	129		—
2020	142		10.1%
U.S. Decennial Census; 2010 2020

=== 2020 census ===
Hagarville CDP, Arkansas – Racial and ethnic composition Note: the US Census treats Hispanic/Latino as an ethnic category. This table excludes Latinos from the racial categories and assigns them to a separate category. Hispanics/Latinos may be of any race.
Race / Ethnicity (NH = Non-Hispanic)	Pop 2010	Pop 2020	% 2010	% 2020
White alone (NH)	116	133	89.92%	93.66%
Black or African American alone (NH)	3	1	2.33%	0.70%
Native American or Alaska Native alone (NH)	0	1	0.00%	0.70%
Asian alone (NH)	0	0	0.00%	0.00%
Pacific Islander alone (NH)	0	0	0.00%	0.00%
Some Other Race alone (NH)	0	0	0.00%	0.00%
Mixed Race or Multi-Racial (NH)	5	6	3.88%	4.23%
Hispanic or Latino (any race)	5	1	3.88%	0.70%
Total	129	142	100.00%	100.00%
