= Jasper, Arkansas =

- City
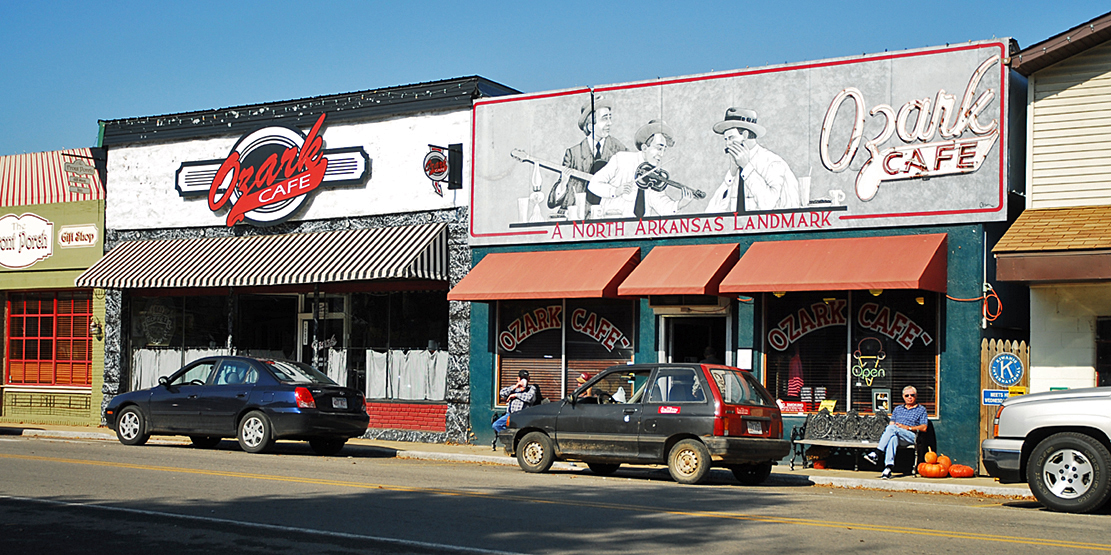
- Historic downtown Jasper

- Location of Jasper in Newton County, Arkansas.
- Coordinates: 36°00′45″N 93°11′15″W
- Country: United States
- State: Arkansas
- County: Newton

Area
  - Total: 0.98 sq mi (2.53 km^{2})
  - Land: 0.95 sq mi (2.47 km^{2})
  - Water: 0.023 sq mi (0.06 km^{2})
- Elevation: 876 ft (267 m)

Population (2020)
  - Total: 547
  - Estimate (2025): 516 ▼
  - Density: 573.2/sq mi (221.31/km^{2})
- Time zone: UTC-6 (Central (CST))
  - Summer (DST): UTC-5 (CDT)
- ZIP Code: 72641
- Area code: 870
- FIPS code: 05-34900
- GNIS feature ID: 2404791
- Website: cityofjasper.org

Jasper is a city in and the county seat of Newton County, Arkansas, United States. According to the 2020 census, its population is 547.

Jasper is part of the Harrison Micropolitan Statistical Area.

== Geography ==
According to the United States Census Bureau, the city has a total area of 0.5 square miles (1.3 km^{2}), all land.

== Major highway ==
- Highway 7

== Demographics ==
Historical population
Census	Pop.	Note	%±
1880	91		—
1910	242		—
1920	253		4.5%
1930	385		52.2%
1940	412		7.0%
1950	407		−1.2%
1960	273		−32.9%
1970	394		44.3%
1980	519		31.7%
1990	332		−36.0%
2000	498		50.0%
2010	466		−6.4%
2020	547		17.4%
2025 (est.)	516	▼	−5.7%
U.S. Decennial Census

=== 2020 census ===
Jasper racial composition
Race	Number	Percentage
White (non-Hispanic)	500	91.41%
Black or African American (non-Hispanic)	1	0.18%
Native American	7	1.28%
Asian	4	0.73%
Pacific Islander	1	0.18%
Other/Mixed	24	4.39%
Hispanic or Latino	10	1.83%

As of the 2020 United States census, there were 547 people, 240 households, and 137 families residing in the city.

=== 2000 census ===
At the 2000 census there were 498 people in 231 households, including 115 families, in the city. The population density was 940.4 inhabitants per square mile (363.1/km^{2}). There were 261 housing units at an average density of 492.9 per square mile (190.3/km^{2}). The racial makeup of the city was 99.98% White, 0.01% Native American, 0.01% from other races, and 0.00% from two or more races. 0.00% of the population were Hispanic or Latino of any race. Of the 233 households 24.8% had children under the age of 18 living with them, 32.5% were married couples living together, 15.2% had a female householder with no husband present, and 49.8% were non-families. 48.5% of households were one person and 27.8% were one person aged 65 or older. The average household size was 1.95 and the average family size was 2.82.

The age distribution was 21.3% under the age of 18, 6.4% from 18 to 24, 18.7% from 25 to 44, 22.5% from 45 to 64, and 31.1% 65 or older. The median age was 49 years. For every 100 females, there were 71.7 males. For every 100 females age 18 and over, there were 63.7 males.

The median household income was $13,556 and the median family income was $26,668. Males had a median income of $21,458 versus $16,786 for females. The per capita income for the city was $13,557. About 25.9% of families and 31.6% of the population were below the poverty line, including 47.6% of those under age 18 and 25.4% of those age 65 or over.

== Education ==
Jasper is headquarters for the Jasper School District, which is geographically one of the state's largest and serves portions of five counties. Jasper School District includes the Jasper Elementary School and Jasper High School.

== See also ==
- Gould Jones Reservoir
