= National Register of Historic Places listings in Buffalo National River =

This is a list of the National Register of Historic Places listings in Buffalo National River.

This is intended to be a complete list of the properties and districts on the National Register of Historic Places in Buffalo National River, Arkansas, United States. The locations of National Register properties and districts for which the latitude and longitude coordinates are included below, may be seen in a Google map.

There are eight properties and districts listed on the National Register in the park.

This National Park Service list is complete through NPS recent listings posted August 7, 2026.

== Current listings ==
	Name on the Register	Image	Date listed	Location	City or town	Description
1	Big Buffalo Valley Historic District	Big Buffalo Valley Historic District	July 29, 1987 (#87000110)	Buffalo National River; 35°59′56″N 93°23′29″W	Ponca	
2	Buffalo River Bridge	Buffalo River Bridge	April 9, 1990 (#90000509)	Highway 7, over the Buffalo River; 36°03′38″N 93°08′18″W	Pruitt	
3	Buffalo River State Park	Buffalo River State Park	October 20, 1988 (#78003461)	Buffalo National River; 36°04′41″N 92°34′06″W	Yellville	
4	Cold Springs School	Cold Springs School	October 29, 1992 (#92001494)	Cold Spring Hollow, just east of the Buffalo National River; 36°04′53″N 92°28′01″W	Big Flat	
5	Flowers Cabin	Flowers Cabin	January 6, 2021 (#100005991)	Buffalo National River, Bench Trail, approx. .2 mi. east of the Hemmed In Hollow Trail, south of the Compton Trailhead; 36°04′30″N 93°12′12″W	Compton vicinity	
6	Parker-Hickman Farm Historic District	Parker-Hickman Farm Historic District	August 11, 1987 (#87001029)	Buffalo National River; 36°04′16″N 93°13′18″W	Erbie	
7	Rush Historic District	Rush Historic District	February 27, 1987 (#87000105)	Rush Rd. 36°07′37″N 92°33′10″W	Yellville	
8	Villines Mill	Villines Mill	July 31, 1974 (#74000482)	North of Boxley on Highway 43; 35°59′18″N 93°23′58″W	Boxley	

== See also ==
- Calf Creek site
- National Register of Historic Places listings in Marion County, Arkansas
- National Register of Historic Places listings in Newton County, Arkansas
- National Register of Historic Places listings in Arkansas
