= National Register of Historic Places listings in Newton County, Arkansas =

Location of Newton County in Arkansas

This is a list of the National Register of Historic Places listings in Newton County, Arkansas.

This is intended to be a complete list of the properties and districts on the National Register of Historic Places in Newton County, Arkansas, United States. The locations of National Register properties and districts for which the latitude and longitude coordinates are included below, may be seen in a map.

There are 14 properties and districts listed on the National Register in the county, and two former listings.

Contents: Counties in Arkansas
- Arkansas
- Ashley
- Baxter
- Benton
- Boone
- Bradley
- Calhoun
- Carroll
- Chicot
- Clark
- Clay
- Cleburne
- Cleveland
- Columbia
- Conway
- Craighead
- Crawford
- Crittenden
- Cross
- Dallas
- Desha
- Drew
- Faulkner
- Franklin
- Fulton
- Garland
- Grant
- Greene
- Hempstead
- Hot Spring
- Howard
- Independence
- Izard
- Jackson
- Jefferson
- Johnson
- Lafayette
- Lawrence
- Lee
- Lincoln
- Little River
- Logan
- Lonoke
- Madison
- Marion
- Miller
- Mississippi
- Monroe
- Montgomery
- Nevada
- Newton
- Ouachita
- Perry
- Phillips
- Pike
- Poinsett
- Polk
- Pope
- Prairie
- Pulaski (Little Rock)
- Randolph
- St. Francis
- Saline
- Scott
- Searcy
- Sebastian
- Sevier
- Sharp
- Stone
- Union
- Van Buren
- Washington
- White
- Woodruff
- Yell

This National Park Service list is complete through NPS recent listings posted December 19, 2025.

== Current listings ==
	Name on the Register	Image	Date listed	Location	City or town	Description
1	Archeological Site 3NW79		May 23, 2007 (#07000202)	Address Restricted	Cowell	
2	Big Buffalo Valley Historic District	Big Buffalo Valley Historic District	July 29, 1987 (#87000110)	Buffalo National River; 35°59′56″N 93°23′29″W	Ponca	
3	Dr. Hudson Sanitarium Agricultural Building Historic District		October 8, 1992 (#92001345)	Highway 327, south of its junction with Highway 74; 35°59′42″N 93°12′12″W	Jasper	
4	Flowers Cabin	Flowers Cabin	January 6, 2021 (#100005991)	Buffalo National River, Bench Trail, approx. .2 mi. east of the Hemmed In Hollow Trail, south of the Compton Trailhead; 36°04′30″N 93°12′12″W	Compton vicinity	
5	Harp Creek Bridge	Harp Creek Bridge	April 9, 1990 (#90000519)	Highway 7 over Harp Creek; 36°04′58″N 93°08′14″W	Jasper	
6	Jasper Commercial Historic District	Jasper Commercial Historic District	January 21, 2010 (#09001255)	Roughly bounded by Sycamore St., E. Elm St., N. Spring St., and Clark St. 36°00′29″N 93°11′14″W	Jasper	
7	Gould Jones Reservoir	Gould Jones Reservoir	August 24, 1998 (#98000956)	Highway 7 just south of Jasper; 36°00′12″N 93°11′07″W	Jasper	
8	Little Buffalo River Bridge	Little Buffalo River Bridge	May 26, 1995 (#95000647)	Highway 327 over the Little Buffalo River; 35°58′07″N 93°13′37″W	Parthenon	
9	May Farmstead		December 9, 1999 (#99001470)	3 miles northeast of Bass on Cave Creek; 35°56′15″N 92°58′36″W	Bass	
10	Newton County Courthouse	Newton County Courthouse	December 1, 1994 (#94001412)	Courthouse Sq. 36°00′29″N 93°11′13″W	Jasper	
11	Newton County Jail	Newton County Jail	December 1, 1994 (#94001414)	Junction of Spring and Elm Sts. 36°00′31″N 93°11′12″W	Jasper	
12	Parker-Hickman Farm Historic District	Parker-Hickman Farm Historic District	August 11, 1987 (#87001029)	Buffalo National River; 36°04′16″N 93°13′18″W	Erbie	
13	Valley Y Ranch		October 10, 2023 (#100009410)	North of the jct. of AR 74 and Steel Creek Rd. 36°01′53″N 93°20′31″W	Ponca vicinity	
14	Villines Mill	Villines Mill	July 31, 1974 (#74000482)	North of Boxley on Highway 43; 35°59′18″N 93°23′58″W	Boxley	

== Former listings ==
	Name on the Register	Image	Date listed	Date removed	Location	City or town	Description
1	Buffalo River Bridge	Buffalo River Bridge	April 9, 1990 (#90000509)	January 3, 2022	Highway 7, over the Buffalo River; 36°03′38″N 93°08′18″W	Pruitt	Demolished in June 2021.
2	Newton County Academy		January 18, 1979 (#79000447)	June 3, 1986	Gum Springs Rd.	Parthenon	

== See also ==
- List of National Historic Landmarks in Arkansas
- National Register of Historic Places listings in Buffalo National River
- National Register of Historic Places listings in Arkansas
