= Kenneth L. Smith =

Kenneth L. Smith is a former civil engineer for the National Park Service, freelance writer, photographer, author, historian, naturalist, and environmentalist. Working with the Ozark Society, he was a key activist for the formation of the Buffalo National River and working with the Buffalo River Foundation he continues to explore ways to benefit the park. He has served over 30 years as trail development coordinator for the Buffalo River Trail, leading crews of mostly volunteers.

== Early life ==
Kenneth grew up in Hot Springs, Arkansas. He is the son of Elton V. and Carol Gibbs Smith. He entered the University of Arkansas, Fayetteville, in 1952. While there, in 1953, he joined a hiking group and became familiar with the Buffalo River area and northwest Arkansas.

After college he worked as an engineer for a paper company in Crossett, Arkansas. During this time he became involved in an effort to preserve the Lost Valley area near Ponca, Arkansas by preparing a report The Nature Conservancy titled "Natural Area Project Analysis, Clark Creek Watershed, including the natural area known as ‘Lost Valley’" in 1958. In 1961 he accepted a position with the National Park Service as civil engineer and park planner.

Leaving the park service in 1974, he returned to northwest Arkansas to work as freelance writer, photographer, activist.

== Education ==
B.S Mechanical Engineering, University of Arkansas, 1956.

M.S. Natural Resources Administration, University of Michigan.

== Role In Formation of Buffalo National River ==
He took a leave of absence from the park service from December 1964 to June 1965 to work on a book to promote preservation of the Buffalo River. Working with the Ozark Society, "The Buffalo River Country" was published in 1967. The book, the first about the area, was a key part of efforts underway to create the first national river and also provided the revenue for future publications by the Ozark Society.

He contributed as an engineer to the first master plan "Final Master Plan: Buffalo National River, Arkansas".

== Role In Development of Buffalo River Trail ==
He began coordinating development of the Buffalo River Trail in 1986.

== Bibliography ==
=== Publications ===
The Buffalo River Country: 1967 University of Arkansas Press

Illinois River: Published January 1, 1977 by University of Arkansas Press

Sawmill: The Story of Cutting the Last Great Virgin Forest East of the Rockies: Published July 1, 1986 by University of Arkansas Press. Virginia K. Ledbetter Prize, 1988 best nonfiction work on Arkansas.

Buffalo River Handbook: Published July 1, 2004 by Ozark Society

== Awards ==
Arkansas Tourism Hall of Fame - Inducted 2017.

== Notes ==
Kenneth L. Smith was the subject of the 2016 video nature documentary "The Trailblazer, Ken Smith and the Buffalo River Trail" by Road of Awe art & media, Bentonville, Arkansas. 1
