= Jasper Commercial Historic District =

Historic district in Arkansas, United States

- U.S. National Register of Historic Places
- U.S. Historic district
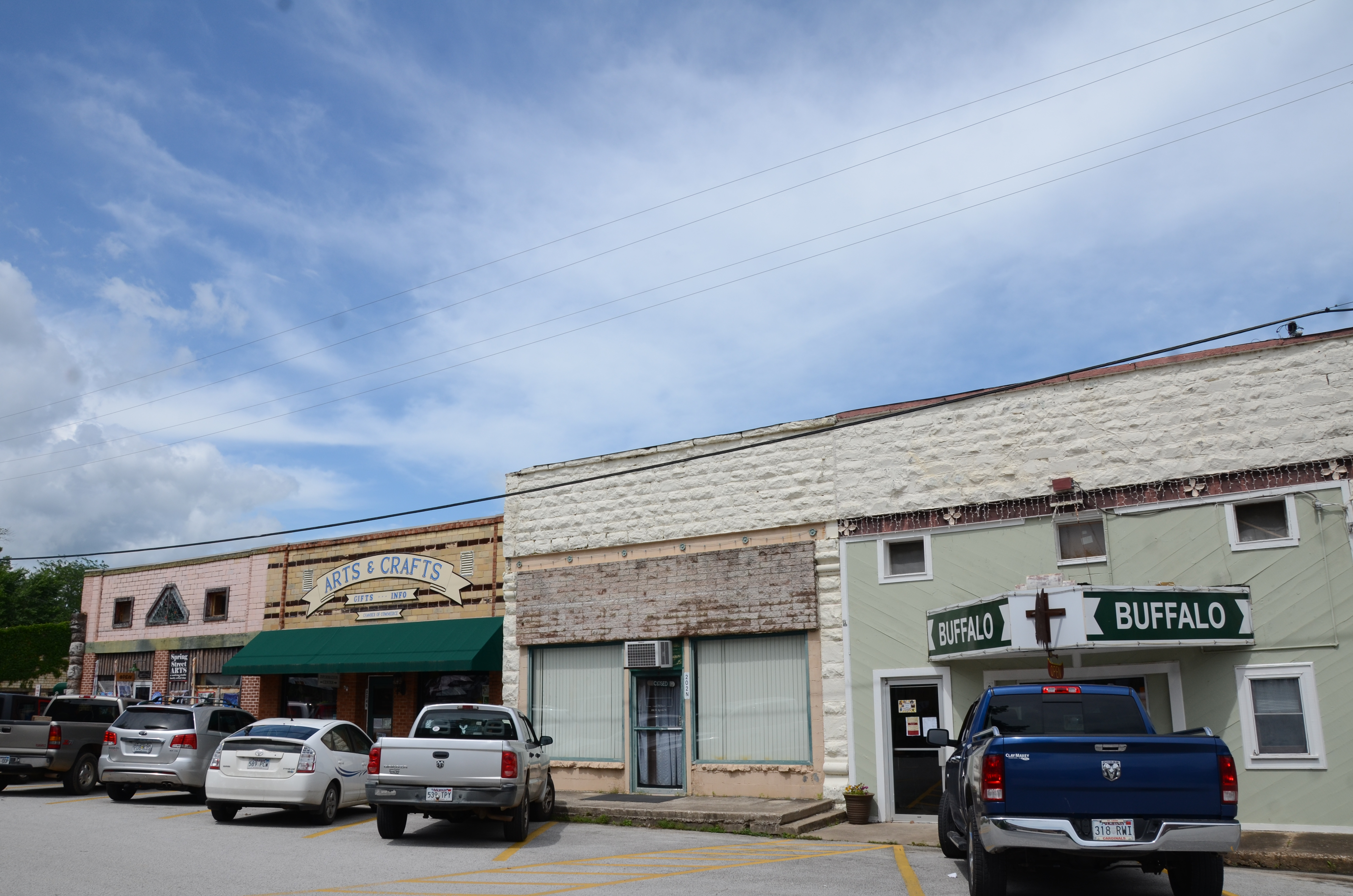

- Location within Arkansas Location within the United States
- Location: Roughly bounded by Sycamore St., E. Elm St., N. Spring St., and Clark St., Jasper, Arkansas
- Coordinates: 36°0′36″N 93°11′13″W
- Area: 4.2 acres (1.7 ha)
- Built: 1873
- Built by: Waldo Fowler, Gould Jones, Heilman Construction Company, B. F. Ruble, Works Progress Administration
- Architect: Fay Jones
- Architectural style: Art Deco, Early Commercial
- NRHP reference No.: 09001255
- Added to NRHP: January 21, 2010

The Jasper Commercial Historic District encompasses the historic commercial center of Jasper, Arkansas. It includes the Newton County Courthouse, a 1930s Works Progress Administration building, and buildings that line the courthouse square, as well as some of the streets radiating from it. Built between the 1880s and 1940s, the district includes a high quality collection of commercial buildings constructed out of local stone. Most are one or two stories in height, and are vernacular to the period of their construction. Five of the district's 26 buildings were built by Gould Jones, a prominent local blacksmith and mason.

Two of the district's buildings were constructed prior to 1900. The Brasel Mercantile Store, built in 1973, currently houses the Ozark Cafe. The B.F. Ruble Building was built in 1894 for the Newton County Bank. A photography studio is now on the ground floor, and the second story is associated living quarters.

The district was listed on the National Register of Historic Places in 2010.

== See also ==
- Gould Jones Reservoir
- National Register of Historic Places listings in Newton County, Arkansas
