= Rush Creek mining district =

Coordinates: 36°7′59″N 92°34′15″W

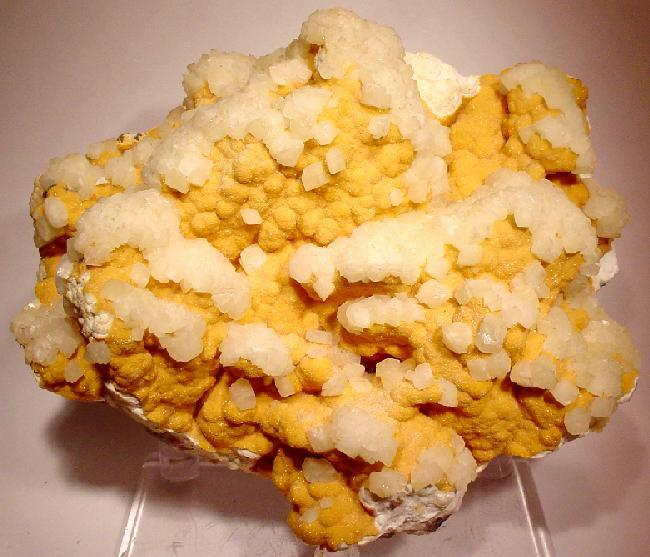
Smithsonite with calcite from the Monte Cristo mine, Rush Creek District, Marion County, Arkansas (size: 11.7 x 9.3 x 5.2 cm

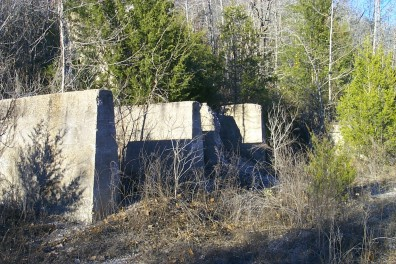
Ruins of the New White Eagle Mill, Rush Historic District, Buffalo National River, Arkansas

The best known and most prolific zinc mining region of north Arkansas for many years was the Rush Creek mining district of Marion County. Its history began when John Wolfer—an early prospector along the Buffalo River—discovered a large deposit of zinc on the creek in southern Marion County. George Chase purchased Wolfer's claim and established the Morning Star Mining Company, which eventually became one of the largest producers of zinc in Arkansas. One day a miner at the Morning Star Mine extracted a single mass of pure smithsonite (zinc carbonate) weighing 12,750 pounds.

The miners originally thought that they were mining silver. They soon discovered that the "silver" that they were mining was not actually silver; it was zinc. Two to five thousand people lived in Rush Creek during the boom period, during World War I.

Individual mines of the Rush District included:

- Climax Mine
- Mattie May Mine
- Monte Cristo mine ("Monte Christo" mine)
- Philadelphia mine
- Silver Hollow Mine

Rush was a true influence to North Arkansas and the Buffalo River Valley.

== See also ==
- Rush Historic District
