= Pratt School =

Pratt School may refer to:

- Pratt Institute, a private university in Brooklyn, New York City
- Pratt School (Birmingham, Alabama), a school in Birmingham, Alabama, listed in the National Register of Historic Places
- Pratt School of Engineering, Duke University, in Durham, North Carolina

== See also ==
- Pyatt School Building, a United States historic place
