= Newton County Jail =

- U.S. National Register of Historic Places
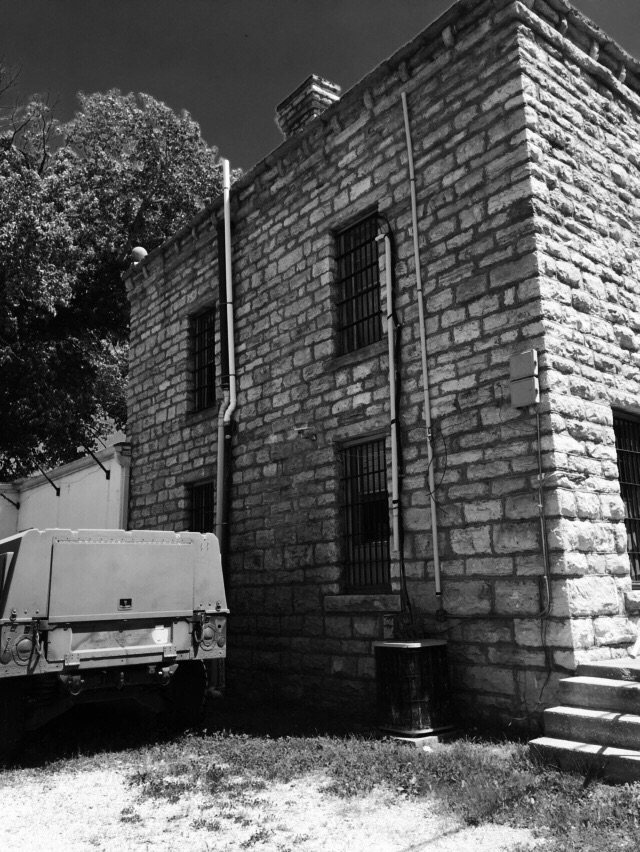

- Location within Arkansas Location within the United States
- Location: Jct. of Spring and Elm Sts., Jasper, Arkansas
- Coordinates: 36°0′31″N 93°11′12″W
- Area: less than one acre
- Built: 1902
- Architect: Heilman Construction Co.
- Architectural style: Italianate
- NRHP reference No.: 94001414
- Added to NRHP: December 1, 1994

The former Newton County Jail is located at the junction of Spring and Elm Streets in Jasper, Arkansas. Built of local stone c. 1903–04, it served as a local lockup until 2009, when a new jail was opened. It is a two-story structure, located just off the courthouse square northwest of the county courthouse. Its main facade has a center entrance flanked by barred windows, and a larger two-leaf casement window, also barred, set in a segmented-arch opening, at the center of the second floor.

The building was listed on the National Register of Historic Places in 1994.

== See also ==
- National Register of Historic Places listings in Newton County, Arkansas
