= Villines =

Villines may refer to:

- Matt Villines (1977-2016), American filmmaker
- Michael Villines (born 1967), American politician
- Villines Mill, mill in Arkansas, United States
