= National Register of Historic Places listings in Marion County, Arkansas =

Location of Marion County in Arkansas

This is a list of the National Register of Historic Places listings in Marion County, Arkansas.

This is intended to be a complete list of the properties and districts on the National Register of Historic Places in Marion County, Arkansas, United States. The locations of National Register properties and districts for which the latitude and longitude coordinates are included below, may be seen in a map.

There are 26 properties and districts listed on the National Register in the county, and one former listing.

Contents: Counties in Arkansas
- Arkansas
- Ashley
- Baxter
- Benton
- Boone
- Bradley
- Calhoun
- Carroll
- Chicot
- Clark
- Clay
- Cleburne
- Cleveland
- Columbia
- Conway
- Craighead
- Crawford
- Crittenden
- Cross
- Dallas
- Desha
- Drew
- Faulkner
- Franklin
- Fulton
- Garland
- Grant
- Greene
- Hempstead
- Hot Spring
- Howard
- Independence
- Izard
- Jackson
- Jefferson
- Johnson
- Lafayette
- Lawrence
- Lee
- Lincoln
- Little River
- Logan
- Lonoke
- Madison
- Marion
- Miller
- Mississippi
- Monroe
- Montgomery
- Nevada
- Newton
- Ouachita
- Perry
- Phillips
- Pike
- Poinsett
- Polk
- Pope
- Prairie
- Pulaski (Little Rock)
- Randolph
- St. Francis
- Saline
- Scott
- Searcy
- Sebastian
- Sevier
- Sharp
- Stone
- Union
- Van Buren
- Washington
- White
- Woodruff
- Yell

This National Park Service list is complete through NPS recent listings posted December 19, 2025.

== Current listings ==
| | Name on the Register | Image | Date listed | Location | City or town | Description |
|---|---|---|---|---|---|---|
| 1 | Aggie Hall | Aggie Hall | September 4, 1992 (#92001115) | County Road 9; 36°08′30″N 92°46′51″W | Bruno | |
| 2 | Aggie Workshop | Aggie Workshop | September 4, 1992 (#92001113) | Highway 235S; 36°08′32″N 92°46′51″W | Bruno | |
| 3 | J.C. Berry's Dry Goods Store | J.C. Berry's Dry Goods Store | May 30, 2003 (#03000468) | 331 Old South Main St. 36°13′29″N 92°40′53″W | Yellville | |
| 4 | Buffalo River State Park | Buffalo River State Park | October 20, 1988 (#78003461) | Buffalo National River; 36°04′41″N 92°34′06″W | Yellville | |
| 5 | Carter-Jones House | Carter-Jones House | July 21, 1987 (#87000979) | 30 Carter St. 36°13′37″N 92°41′00″W | Yellville | |
| 6 | Cold Springs School | Cold Springs School | October 29, 1992 (#92001494) | Cold Spring Hollow, just east of the Buffalo National River; 36°04′53″N 92°28′01″W | Big Flat | |
| 7 | Cotter Tunnel | Cotter Tunnel | September 19, 2007 (#07000961) | Under U.S. Route 62 east of County Road 724; 36°16′41″N 92°32′53″W | Cotter | |
| 8 | Cowdrey House | Cowdrey House | July 20, 1978 (#78000609) | 1 Valley St. 36°13′27″N 92°40′48″W | Yellville | |
| 9 | Crooked Creek Bridge | Crooked Creek Bridge | January 21, 2010 (#09001253) | U.S. Route 62S over Crooked Creek; 36°14′53″N 92°50′38″W | Pyatt | |
| 10 | Eros School Building | Eros School Building | September 4, 1992 (#92001110) | County Road 9; 36°10′58″N 92°51′00″W | Eros | |
| 11 | Estes-Williams American Legion Hut #61 | | February 16, 2001 (#01000111) | U.S. Highways 62/412; 36°13′34″N 92°40′49″W | Yellville | |
| 12 | Fairview School Building | Fairview School Building | September 4, 1992 (#92001116) | County Road 203; 36°20′02″N 92°36′20″W | Fairview | |
| 13 | Flippin City Jail | | March 20, 2023 (#100008565) | Southwest corner of Park and South 2nd Sts. 36°16′36″N 92°35′57″W | Flippin | |
| 14 | Hirst-Mathew Hall | Hirst-Mathew Hall | September 4, 1992 (#92001114) | Highway 235S; 36°08′31″N 92°46′53″W | Bruno | |
| 15 | William Jasper Johnson House | William Jasper Johnson House | September 12, 2018 (#100002949) | N of jct. of Lakeshore Rd. & Honeysuckle Ave. 36°23′05″N 92°34′40″W | Bull Shoals | |
| 16 | Layton Building | Layton Building | April 26, 1978 (#78000610) | 1110 Mill St. 36°13′32″N 92°40′57″W | Yellville | |
| 17 | Marion County Courthouse | Marion County Courthouse | May 19, 1994 (#94000471) | Courthouse Square; 36°13′33″N 92°40′55″W | Yellville | |
| 18 | Mountain Village 1890 | | May 8, 2023 (#100008598) | 1011 CS Woods Blvd. 36°22′46″N 92°35′02″W | Bull Shoals | |
| 19 | Pea Ridge School Building | Pea Ridge School Building | June 8, 1993 (#93000486) | East of County Road 6, approximately 4 miles south of Bruno; 36°05′41″N 92°45′24″W | Bruno | |
| 20 | Pyatt School Building | Pyatt School Building | September 4, 1992 (#92001111) | County Road 12; 36°14′38″N 92°50′42″W | Pyatt | |
| 21 | Pyatt Tunnel | Pyatt Tunnel | September 19, 2007 (#07000953) | Underneath MC 4008 approximately 1 mile south of U.S. Route 62; 36°14′31″N 92°49′17″W | Pyatt | |
| 22 | Rush Historic District | Rush Historic District | February 27, 1987 (#87000105) | Rush Rd. 36°07′37″N 92°33′10″W | Yellville | |
| 23 | Sunburst Shelter | | May 4, 1982 (#82002123) | Address Restricted | Summit | |
| 24 | US 62 Bridge over Crooked Creek | | June 9, 2000 (#00000632) | U.S. Route 62; 36°14′45″N 92°50′04″W | Pyatt | |
| 25 | WPA Privy | | September 5, 2024 (#100010838) | Southwest of the East Hanson Street and Bright Loop intersection 36°15′14″N 92°50′29″W | Pyatt | |
| 26 | Yellville West Overpass | | September 10, 2024 (#100010839) | Marion County Road 4052. approximately 325 feet (99 m) west of U.S. 62/412; 36°15′11″N 92°43′03″W | Yellville | |

== Former listing ==
| | Name on the Register | Image | Date listed | Date removed | Location | City or town | Description |
|---|---|---|---|---|---|---|---|
| 1 | Bruno School Building | | September 4, 1992 (#92001112) | January 24, 2017 | County Road 9; 36°08′32″N 92°46′49″W | Bruno | |

== See also ==
- List of National Historic Landmarks in Arkansas
- National Register of Historic Places listings in Buffalo National River
- National Register of Historic Places listings in Arkansas
