= Fairview School Building (Fairview, Arkansas) =

- U.S. National Register of Historic Places
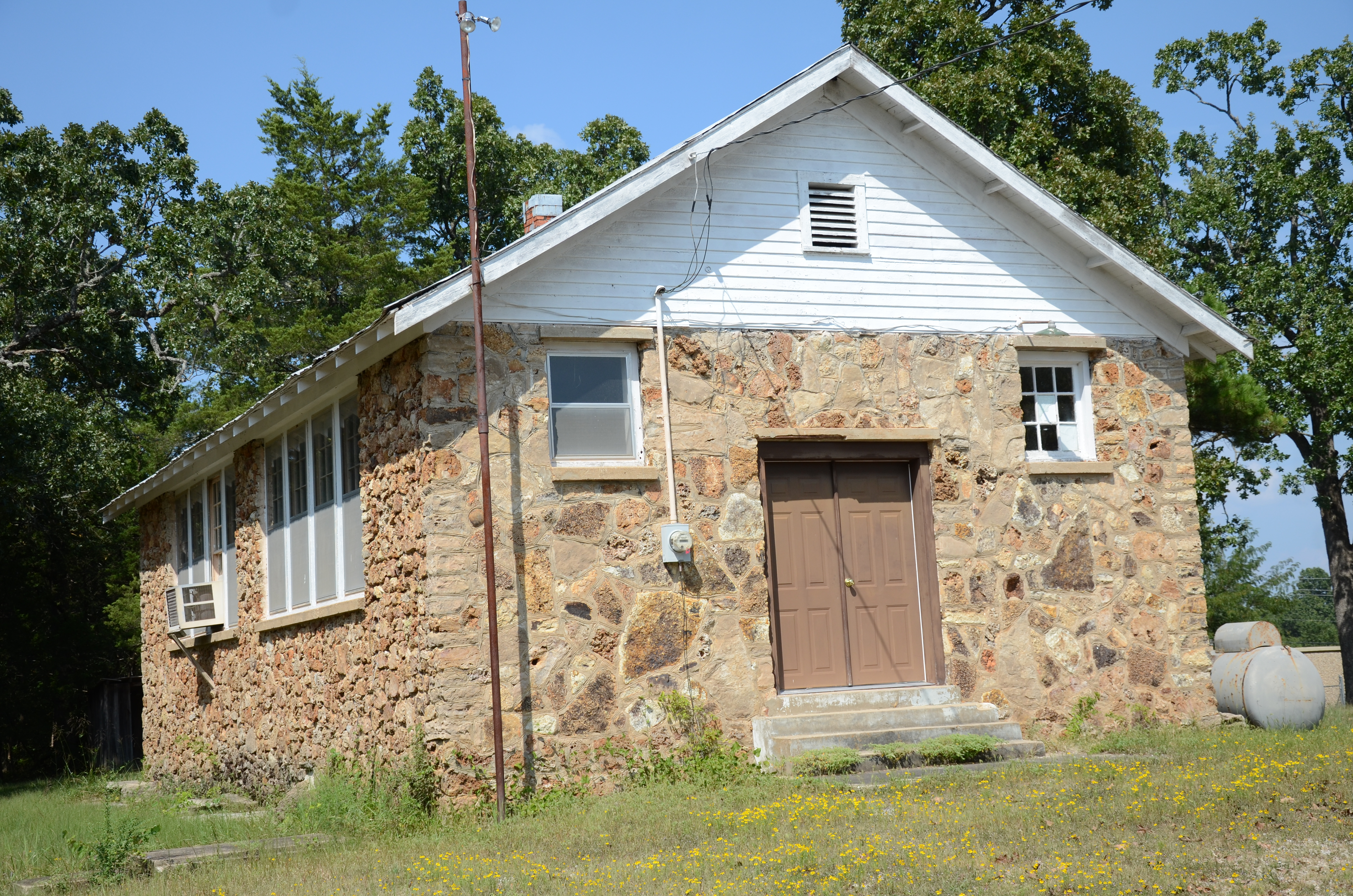

- Location within Arkansas Location within the United States
- Location: Co. Rd. 203, Fairview, Marion County, Arkansas
- Coordinates: 36°20′2″N 92°36′20″W
- Area: less than one acre
- Architectural style: Bungalow/craftsman
- MPS: Public Schools in the Ozarks MPS
- NRHP reference No.: 92001116
- Added to NRHP: September 4, 1992

The Fairview School Building is a historic school building in rural Marion County, Arkansas. It is located on the north side of County Road 8064, just west of its junction with Arkansas Highway 178 and the Fairview fire department. It is a single-story stone structure with a gabled tin roof whose eaves have exposed rafter tails in the Craftsman style. Its walls are of both cut and uncut fieldstone, and the foundation is also stone. The main (south-facing) facade is symmetrical, with sash windows flanking a raised double door. The school was built in 1927 by local volunteer labor, despite a downturn in the area's population and economy.

The building was listed on the National Register of Historic Places in 1992.

== See also ==
- National Register of Historic Places listings in Marion County, Arkansas
