= Hemmed-in Hollow Falls =

Hemmed-In-Hollow Falls
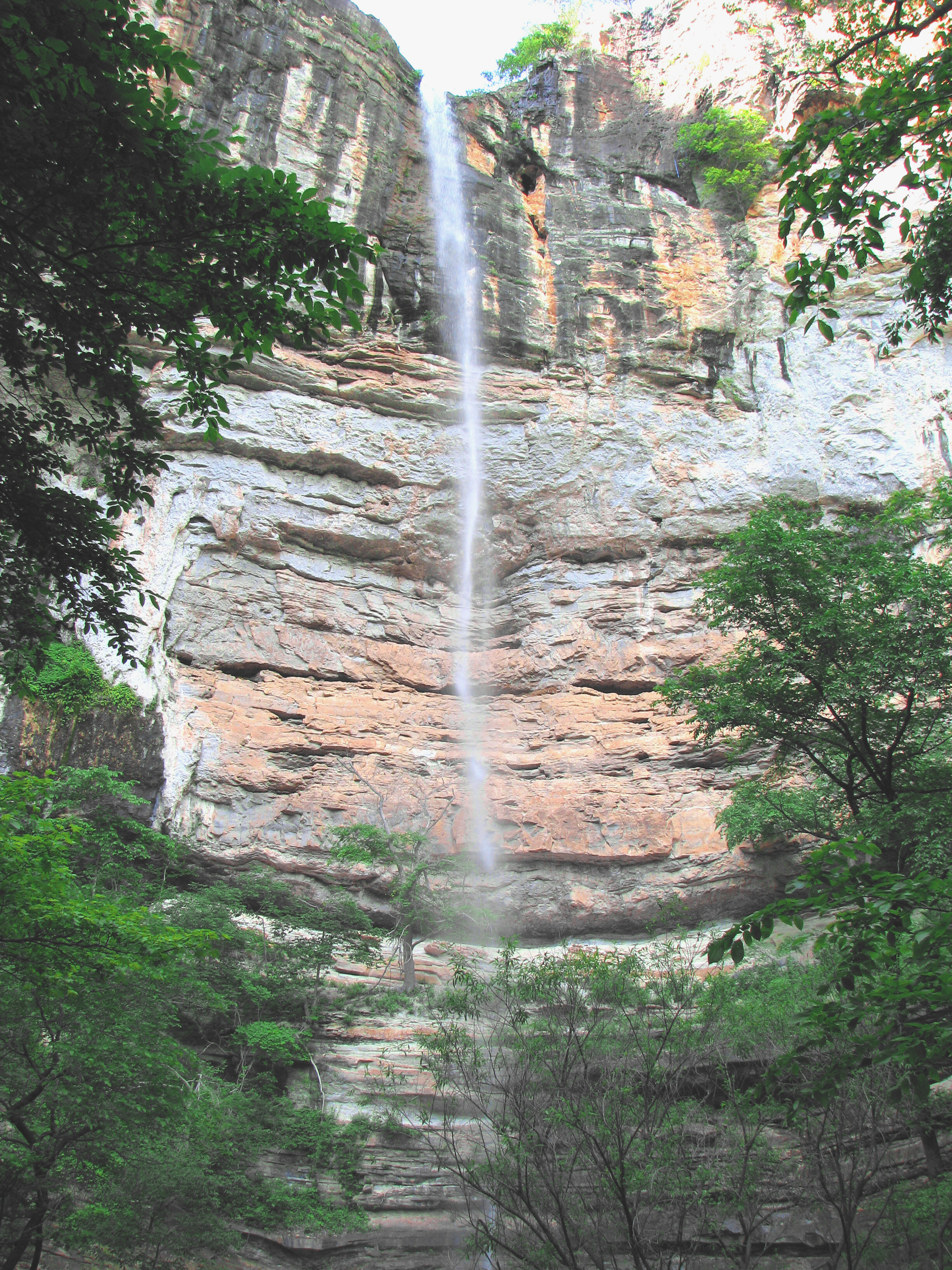
- Hemmed-In-Hollow Falls at high flow.
- Interactive map of Hemmed-In-Hollow Falls
- Location: Buffalo National River, Newton County, Arkansas, United States
- Coordinates: 36.0721°N 93.3074°W
- Type: Plunge
- Total height: 209 feet (64 meters)
- Number of drops: 1

Hemmed-In-Hollow Falls is a single-drop waterfall located within the Ponca Wilderness Area of the Buffalo National River in northern Arkansas. The height of the falls is 209 feet (64 meters). According to the National Park Service, it is the "tallest waterfall between the Rockies and the Appalachians."

The waterfall is located in Hemmed-In Hollow, a small valley closed in on three sides by 200-foot (61 m) bluffs. The area can be accessed from at least three different hiking trails; Centerpoint Trailhead and Compton Trailhead along State Highway 43 north of Ponca are probably the best choices for those wanting to park and hike in. Of the two, the latter offers the most direct access. From Compton the falls are 2.5 miles (4.0 km) from the trailhead, and the route is usually well marked and well maintained, though the hike out of Hemmed-In-Hollow is notoriously steep and difficult. For those floating the Buffalo River, the falls are an easy half-mile trek from the river trailhead and a three-mile hike from Kyle's Landing.

For most of the year the flow over Hemmed-In-Hollow Falls is subdued and during dry periods can diminish to almost nothing. As one looks upward, the water breaks into thousands of individual droplets. Wind swirling in the canyon causes the falls to continually dance about. During times of heavy rain, typically during late winter or early spring, water spills heavily off the cliff.

== See also ==
- List of waterfalls
