= Cowdrey House =

Historic house in Arkansas, United States

- U.S. National Register of Historic Places
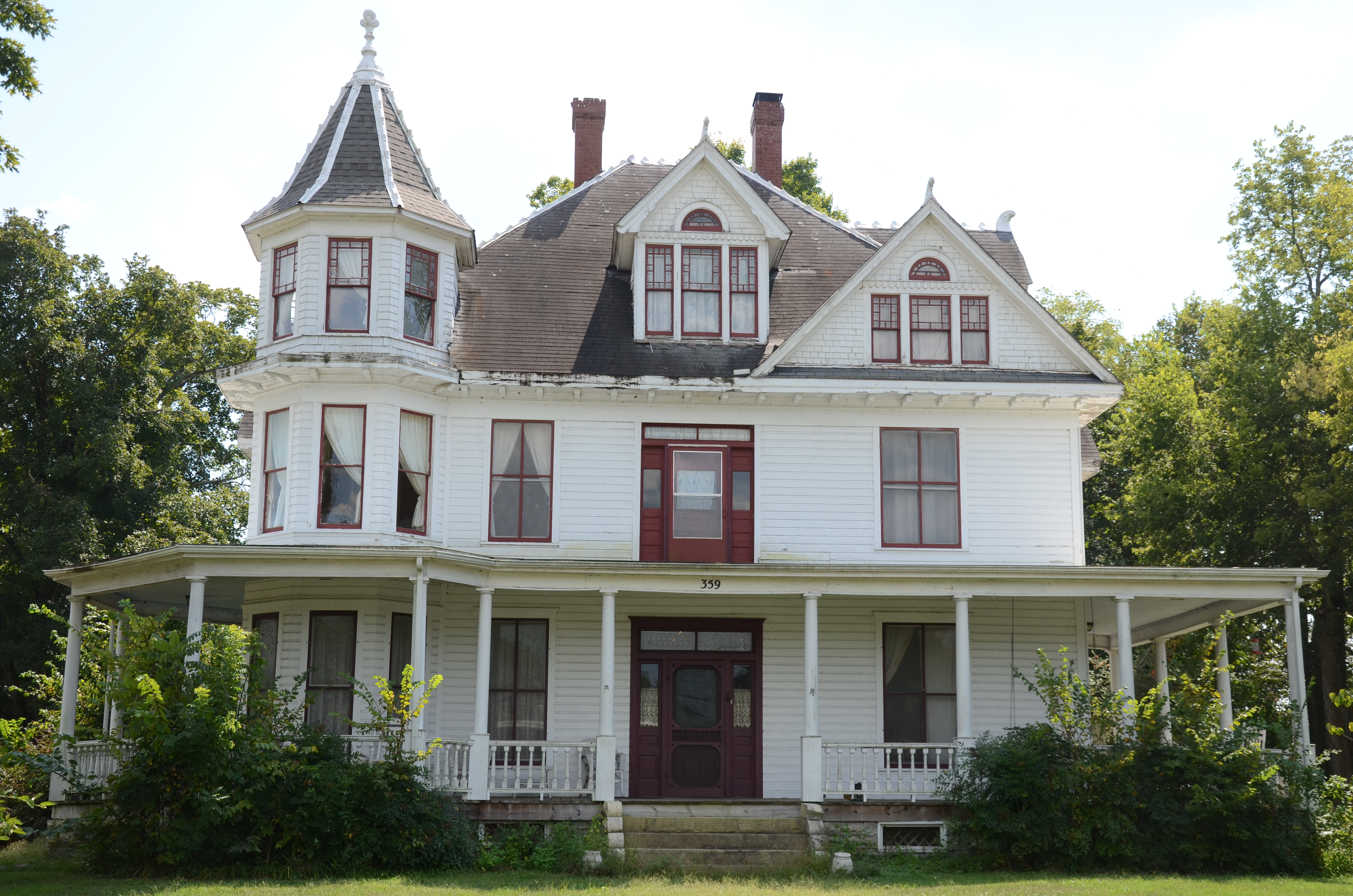

- Location within Arkansas Location within the United States
- Location: 1 Valley St., Yellville, Arkansas
- Coordinates: 36°13′27″N 92°40′48″W
- Area: less than one acre
- Built: 1902
- Architectural style: Late Victorian
- NRHP reference No.: 78000609
- Added to NRHP: July 20, 1978

The Cowdrey House is a historic house at 1 Valley Street in Yellville, Arkansas. It is a 2 1/2-story wood-frame structure, with asymmetrical massing and a pyramidally-roofed turret typical of the Queen Anne style. Built in 1904, the house is particularly notable for its interior woodwork, which was made in Memphis, Tennessee and transported to Yellville for installation. It was built by J. S. Cowdrey, whose family were early settlers of the area and were involved in many local businesses. The Cowdreys hosted future President of the United States Herbert Hoover in 1927.

The house was listed on the National Register of Historic Places in 1978.

== See also ==
- National Register of Historic Places listings in Marion County, Arkansas
