= Cotter Tunnel =

Railroad tunnel in Arkansas, U.S.

- U.S. National Register of Historic Places
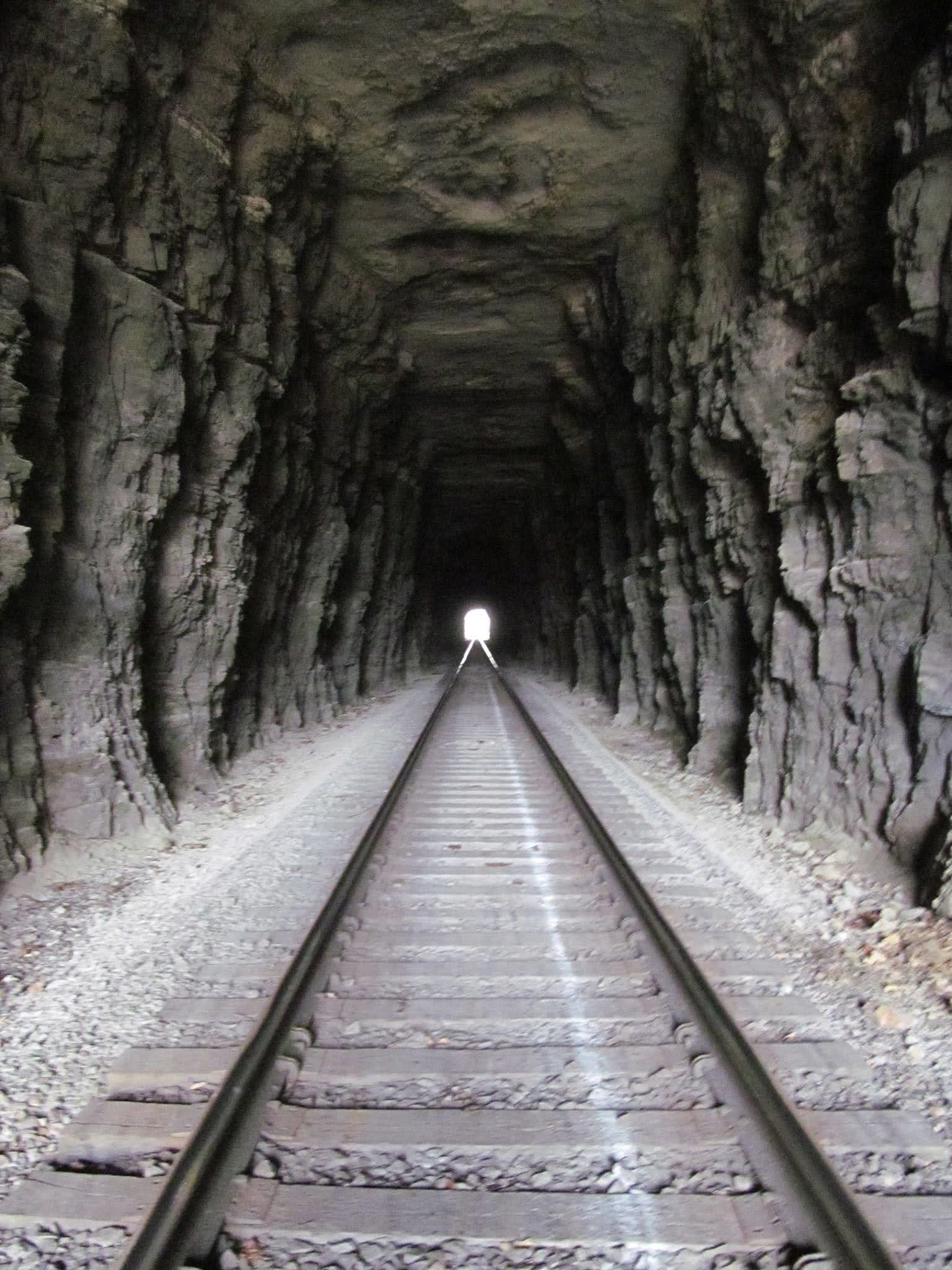
- Opening of the Cotter Railroad Tunnel facing West

- Location within Arkansas Location within the United States
- Nearest city: Cotter, Arkansas
- Coordinates: 36°16′41″N 92°32′53″W
- Area: 1.5 acres (0.61 ha)
- Built: 1903
- NRHP reference No.: 07000961
- Added to NRHP: September 19, 2007

The Cotter Tunnel is a railroad tunnel located just outside Cotter, Arkansas. It carries the Missouri and Northern Arkansas Railroad under a ridge that U.S. Route 62 (US 62) traverses. The tunnel is 1,034 feet (315 m) in length and is cut through solid rock in a northwest–southeast direction. The southeastern portal has a sprayed concrete finish, while the northeastern portal is unfinished. The White River Division of the Missouri Pacific Railroad built the tunnel in 1903–04, and it was an important transportation link to the area at that time. The rail line continues to be used for active freight service.

The tunnel was listed on the National Register of Historic Places in 2007.

== See also ==
- National Register of Historic Places listings in Marion County, Arkansas
- List of bridges on the National Register of Historic Places in Arkansas
