= Gould Jones Reservoir =

- U.S. National Register of Historic Places
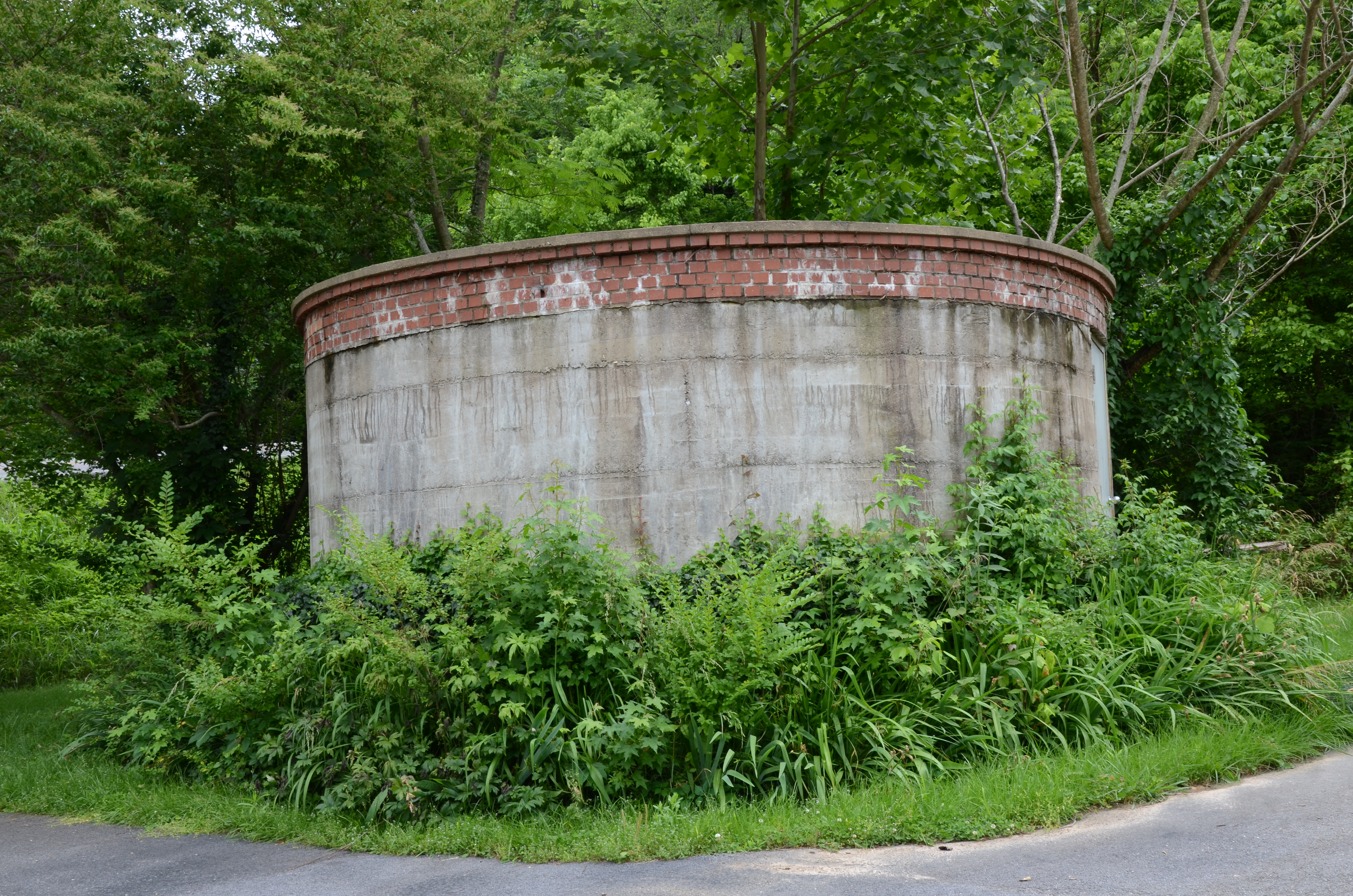

- Location within Arkansas Location within the United States
- Location: AR 7, just S Jasper, Arkansas
- Coordinates: 36°0′12″N 93°11′7″W
- Area: less than one acre
- Built: 1942
- Built by: Gould Jones
- NRHP reference No.: 98000956
- Added to NRHP: August 24, 1998

The Gould Jones Reservoir is a historic water storage tank, located on the grounds of the Newton County library, which was then just outside of Jasper, Arkansas on Arkansas Highway 7. The tank is a circular masonry structure, built out of concrete and brick in 1942 by Gould Jones, a local blacksmith and mason. It was built to provide water to a local tomato canning factory, and to provide water to the community of Jasper.

The tank was listed on the National Register of Historic Places in 1998.

== See also ==
- Jasper Commercial Historic District
- National Register of Historic Places listings in Newton County, Arkansas
