= Archeological Site 3NW79 =

Archaeological site in Arkansas, United States

- U.S. National Register of Historic Places
- Nearest city: Cowell, Arkansas
- Area: 1.7 acres (0.69 ha)
- MPS: Rock Art Sites in Arkansas TR
- NRHP reference No.: 07000202
- Added to NRHP: May 23, 2007

Archeological Site 3NW79 is a prehistoric pictograph site in the Ozark-St. Francis National Forest, in Newton County, Arkansas. It consists of a panel of twenty figures, set in a sheltered area. It is expected to contribute to the understanding of Mississippian cultures that lived in the area c. 1000-1500 CE.

The site was listed on the National Register of Historic Places in 2007 for its information potential.

== See also ==
- National Register of Historic Places listings in Newton County, Arkansas
