= U.S. 62 White River Bridge =

- White River Bridge
- U.S. National Register of Historic Places
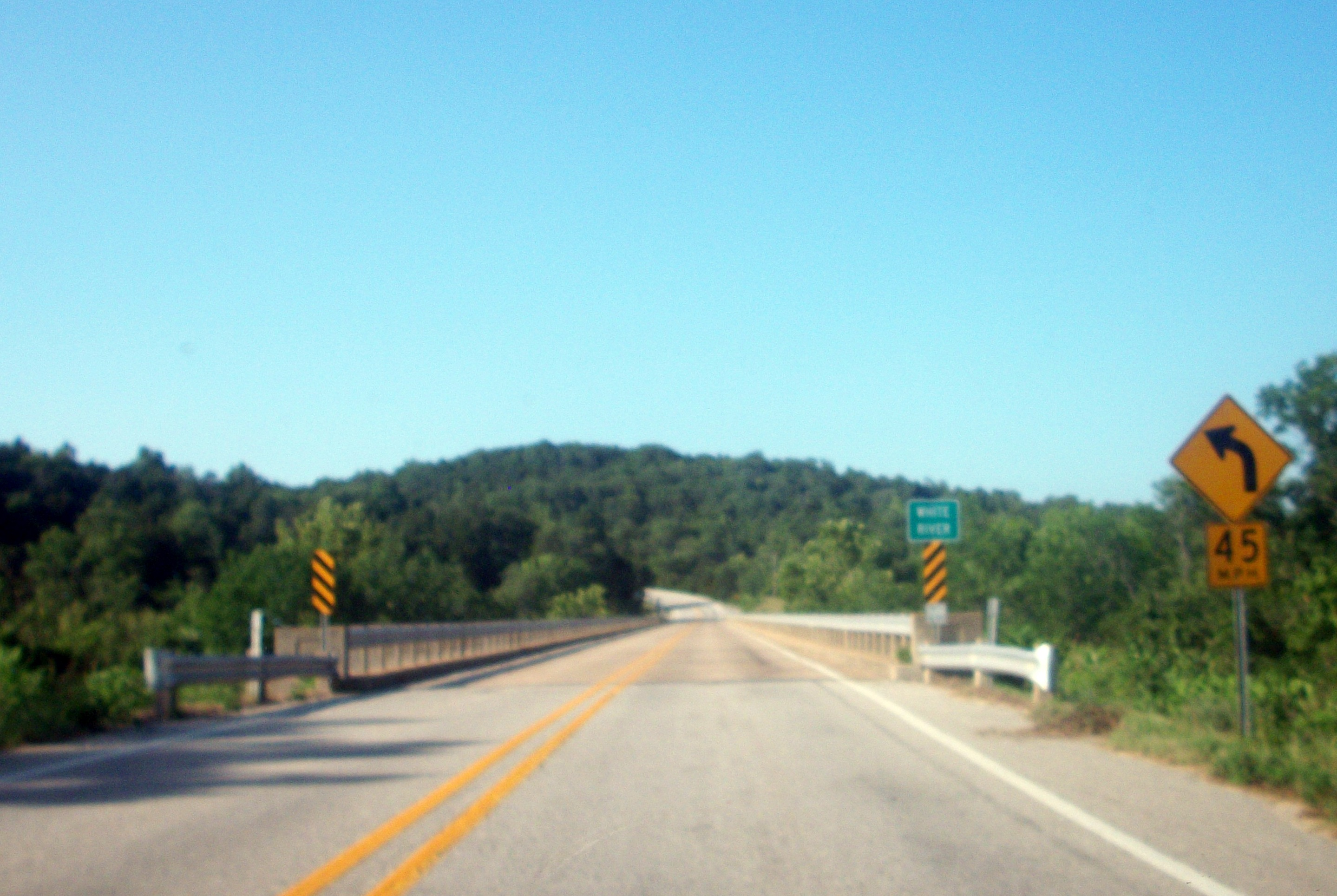
- South approach

- Location within Arkansas Location within the United States
- Location: US 62 over the White River
- Nearest city: Beaver, Arkansas
- Coordinates: 36°27′04″N 93°49′24″W
- Area: Carroll County
- Built: 1952
- Architect: Forcum James Company
- Architectural style: Five span deck-truss
- MPS: Historic Bridges of Arkansas
- NRHP reference No.: 07001421
- Added to NRHP: 24 January 2008

The White River Bridge is a five-span Warren deck truss bridge located near Beaver, Carroll County, Arkansas. It carries U.S. Route 62 over the White River for 786.90 feet (239.85 m). Each span is about 128 feet (39 m) in length and is mounted on concrete piers or abutments. The bridge was built in 1950–52 by the Forcum-James Company of Dyersburg, Tennessee. It was the last of eleven deck-truss bridges built in the state, and is the only one of its type in the county.

The bridge was listed on the National Register of Historic Places in 2008.

== See also ==
- US 62 Bridge over Crooked Creek
- List of bridges on the National Register of Historic Places in Arkansas
- National Register of Historic Places listings in Carroll County, Arkansas
