= US 62 Bridge over Crooked Creek =

- U.S. National Register of Historic Places
- Location within Arkansas Location within the United States
- Nearest city: US 62 / US 412, Pyatt, Arkansas
- Coordinates: 36°14′45″N 92°50′4″W
- Area: 1.9 acres (0.77 ha)
- Built: 1948
- Built by: Pioneer Construction Company Inc.
- Architectural style: Warren Truss with verticals
- MPS: Historic Bridges of Arkansas MPS
- NRHP reference No.: 00000632
- Added to NRHP: June 9, 2000

The US 62 Bridge over Crooked Creek is a historic bridge near Pyatt, Arkansas. It carries US Highway 62 (US 62) and US 412 across Crooked Creek, which flows through the center of Pyatt to the northwest before converging into the White River (Arkansas–Missouri).

== Dimensions ==
The bridge is a three-span steel Warren Truss structure, set on concrete piers and abutments. Each span is about 136 feet (41 m) long, and the bridge has a total length of 412 feet (126 m). Its travel surface is 26 feet (7.9 m) wide, with a total structure width of 32 feet (9.8 m).

== History ==
The bridge, constructed in 1948 by the Pioneer Construction Company of Kansas City, Missouri, stands as one of the finest examples of Warren truss bridge designs in the region. Known for its distinctive structural integrity and aesthetic appeal, this bridge is not just a means of transportation; it is also a significant landmark reflecting the engineering practices of its time.

=== Understanding the Warren Truss design ===
A Warren truss bridge is characterized by its triangular units, which provide excellent support and load distribution. This design minimizes the amount of material needed while maximizing strength, making it both an economical and a robust choice for bridge construction. The structure derives its name from engineer James Warren, who patented this innovative design in the mid-19th century.

The Warren truss consists of straight members arranged in a series of equilateral triangles. This configuration allows for the efficient transfer of loads, making it suitable for both road and railway applications. The simplicity of the design also contributes to lower maintenance costs and shorter construction times compared to other bridge types.

=== Historical significance ===
In the year 2000, the bridge was officially listed on the National Register of Historic Places. This designation recognizes the bridge not only for its architectural style but also for its historical significance in the context of local and national infrastructure development. Bridges like this one played a crucial role in connecting communities and facilitating commerce during the post-World War II era when America was experiencing rapid growth and modernization.

=== Cultural impact and preservation ===
As a historical structure, the bridge serves as a reminder of the engineering innovations of the past and the importance of preserving our cultural heritage. Historical bridges often attract interest from engineers, historians, and the public. Preservation efforts ensure that these structures can continue to be appreciated by future generations.

In recent years, there has been a growing awareness of the importance of maintaining and rehabilitating historic bridges. Restorations not only preserve the aesthetic and functional qualities of these structures but also help promote tourism and local economies.

== See also ==
- U.S. 62 White River Bridge
- List of bridges on the National Register of Historic Places in Arkansas
- National Register of Historic Places listings in Marion County, Arkansas
