= Pyatt Tunnel =

- U.S. National Register of Historic Places
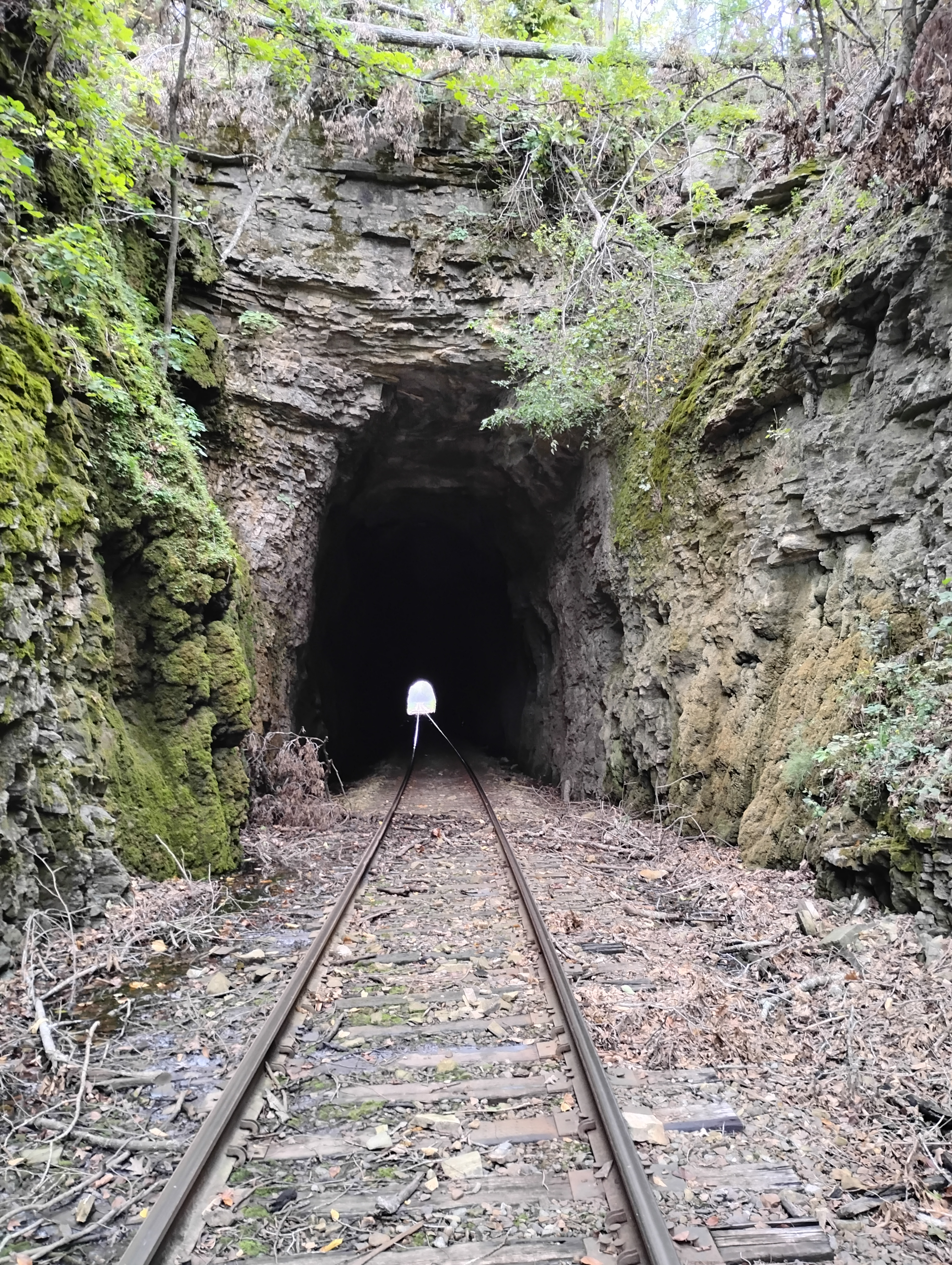
- Pyatt Tunnel in 2024

- Location within Arkansas Location within the United States
- Nearest city: Pyatt, Arkansas
- Coordinates: 36°14′31″N 92°49′17″W
- Area: less than one acre
- Built: 1903
- NRHP reference No.: 07000953
- Added to NRHP: September 19, 2007

The Pyatt Tunnel is a historic railroad tunnel in Marion County, Arkansas. It is a 660-foot (200 m) tunnel, hewn through bedrock beneath a ridge north of Crooked Creek and southeast of the city of Pyatt. The tunnel's portals are unimproved, and the tunnel itself has no concrete reinforcement, unlike other tunnels on the White River Division of the Missouri Pacific Railroad, which passes through it. The tunnel was built in 1903–1904, and is one of seven railroad tunnels in the state.

The tunnel was listed on the National Register of Historic Places in 2007.

== See also ==
- National Register of Historic Places listings in Marion County, Arkansas
- List of bridges on the National Register of Historic Places in Arkansas
