= Dr. Hudson Sanitarium Agricultural Building Historic District =

Historic district in Arkansas, United States

- U.S. National Register of Historic Places
- Location within Arkansas Location within the United States
- Nearest city: Jasper, Arkansas
- Coordinates: 35°59′42″N 93°12′12″W
- Area: 12 acres (4.9 ha)
- Built: 1936
- Built by: W.G. Clark
- Architectural style: Plain Traditional
- NRHP reference No.: 92001345
- Added to NRHP: October 8, 1992

The Dr. Hudson Sanitarium Agricultural Building Historic District encompasses a small cluster of buildings constructed in the 1930s as part of a planned tuberculosis sanitarium in central northern Newton County, Arkansas. It is located on the west side of Arkansas Highway 327, southwest of Jasper, and includes three buildings. Two of them are modest 1 1/2-story log houses, finished with board-and-batten siding, and the third is a two-story wood-frame dairy barn. These were built 1936-39 pursuant to a plan by Dr. William Anderson Hudson, a doctor with deep family ties in the area, to provide facilities for tuberculosis sufferers in the remote area. His plans were frustrated by World War II and state regulations on such facilities, and the main sanitarium was never built.

https://www.arkansasheritage.com/arkansas-preservation/properties/national-registry?cities=Jasper

The property was listed on the National Register of Historic Places in 1992.

== See also ==
- National Register of Historic Places listings in Newton County, Arkansas
