= Cold Springs School =

- U.S. National Register of Historic Places
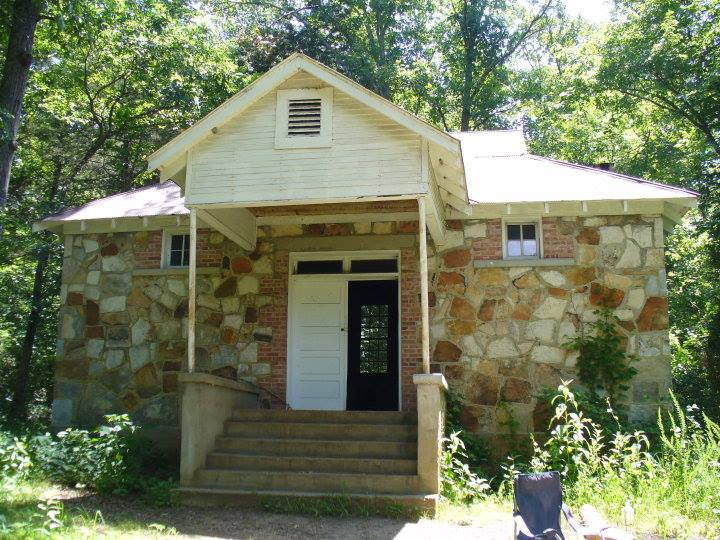

- Location within Arkansas Location within the United States
- Nearest city: Big Flat, Arkansas
- Coordinates: 36°4′53″N 92°28′1″W
- Area: less than one acre
- Built by: Works Progress Administration
- Architectural style: Bungalow/craftsman
- MPS: Public Schools in the Ozarks MPS
- NRHP reference No.: 92001494
- Added to NRHP: October 29, 1992

The Cold Springs School is a historic school building in a remote area of the Buffalo National River in southeastern Marion County, Arkansas. It is located at a place called Cold Springs Hollow that is now only accessible from the river. It is a small single-story fieldstone structure, built c. 1935 with funding from the Works Progress Administration. Construction of the school provided jobs to needy farmers in the area, as well as a place to educate their children.

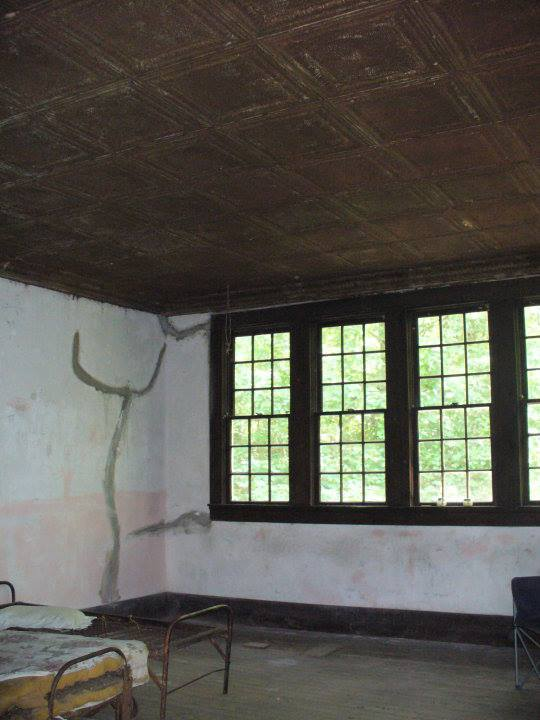
Interior

The school was listed on the National Register of Historic Places in 1992.

== See also ==
- National Register of Historic Places listings in Marion County, Arkansas
