= William Jasper Johnson House =

Historic house in Arkansas, United States

- U.S. National Register of Historic Places
- Location within Arkansas Location within the United States
- Location: N of jct. of Lakeshore Rd. & Honeysuckle Ave., Bull Shoals, Arkansas
- Coordinates: 36°23′5″N 92°34′40″W
- Area: c. 1 acre (0.40 ha)
- Built: c. 1900
- Architectural style: Ozark single pen
- NRHP reference No.: 100002949
- Added to NRHP: September 12, 2018

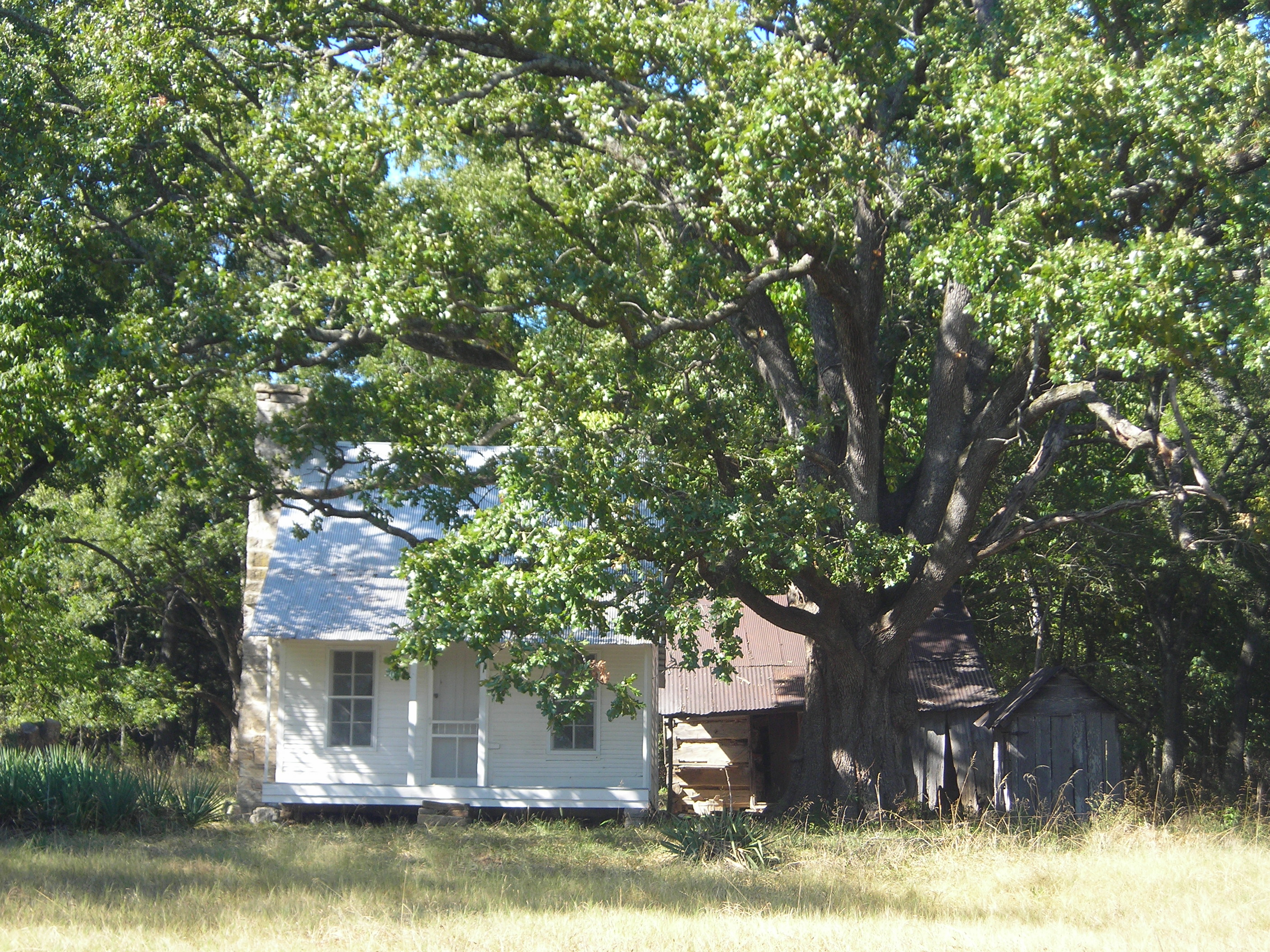
A photo of the William Jasper Johnson House in Bull Shoals Arkansas

The William Jasper Johnson House is a historic house at the junction of Lakeshore Road and Honeysuckle Avenue in Bull Shoals, Arkansas. Located just north of the junction, it is a modest single-story frame structure, finished in drop siding and resting on stone piers. Its form is that of a typical vernacular Ozark single pen, with a side gable roof and shed-roof porch across the front. The house was built about 1900 by William Jasper Johnson, who had married the daughter of a prominent local landowner. It is one of the few surviving reminders of the area's early settlement history.

The house was listed on the National Register of Historic Places in 2018.

== See also ==
- National Register of Historic Places listings in Marion County, Arkansas
