= Sunburst Shelter =

Archaeological site in Arkansas, United States

- U.S. National Register of Historic Places
- Nearest city: Summit, Arkansas
- Area: 0.1 acres (0.040 ha)
- MPS: Rock Art Sites in Arkansas TR
- NRHP reference No.: 82002123
- Added to NRHP: May 4, 1982

The Sunburst Shelter, designated by the survey number 3MR94, is an archaeological site in Marion County, Arkansas. A notable feature of the site is a pictograph depicting a sunburst. Painted in red pigment onto a limestone surface with fingers, the pictograph was described as being in fair condition in 2003, with flaking paint and water staining, and some vandalism to the area.

The site was listed on the National Register of Historic Places in 1982.

== See also ==
- National Register of Historic Places listings in Marion County, Arkansas
