= Carter–Jones House =

Historic house in Arkansas, United States

- U.S. National Register of Historic Places
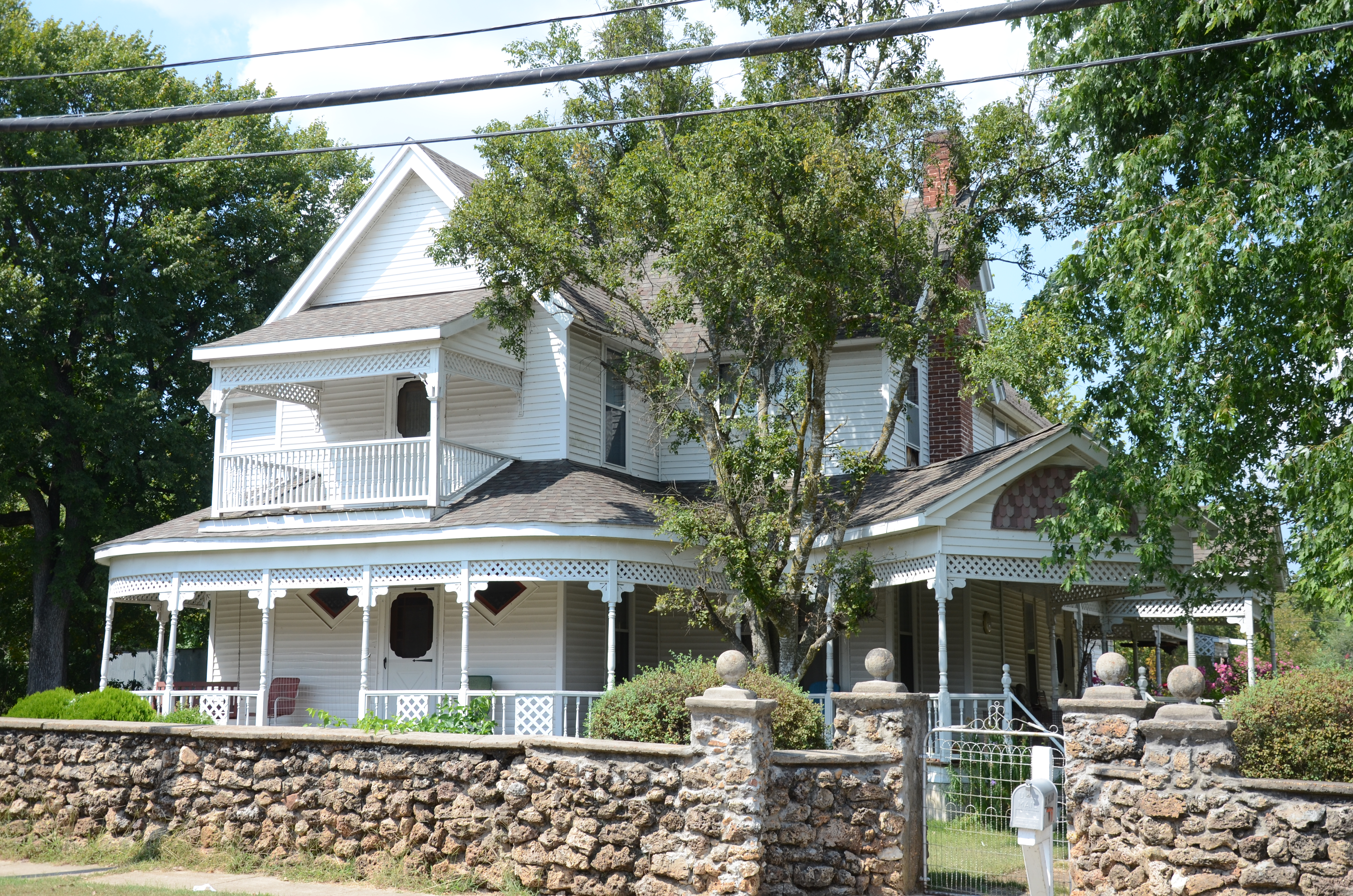

- Location within Arkansas Location within the United States
- Location: 30 Carter Street, Yellville, Arkansas
- Coordinates: 36°13′37″N 92°41′0″W
- Area: less than one acre
- Built: 1901
- Architectural style: Queen Anne
- NRHP reference No.: 87000979
- Added to NRHP: July 21, 1987

The Carter–Jones House is a historic house located in Yellville, Arkansas.

== Description and history ==
It is a two-story structure, built of logs and wood framing, and finished in clapboards. Its appearance is largely the result of major alterations made in 1901 to what was probably a dog trot log structure built in 1847. The only visible elements of the older structure are to be found in the basement of the building, which otherwise appears to be a stylish turn-of-the-century Queen Anne Victorian. The 1901 expansion was made by Perry Carter, a prominent local businessman and politician, and the house was also home to his son-in-law, W. R. Jones, publisher of the Mountain Echo, the local newspaper.

The house was listed on the National Register of Historic Places on July 21, 1987.

== See also ==
- National Register of Historic Places listings in Marion County, Arkansas
