= Calf Creek site =

Archaeological site in Arkansas, United States

- 3SE33
- U.S. National Register of Historic Places
- Nearest city: Silver Hill, Arkansas
- Area: 35 acres (14 ha)
- NRHP reference No.: 76000468
- Added to NRHP: June 29, 1976

The Calf Creek site, designated Site 3SE33 by archaeologists, is an important archaeological site near the mouth of Calf Creek where it empties into the Buffalo River in Searcy County, Arkansas. The site exhibits evidence of long-term occupation, spanning several archaeological eras. It contains one of the largest known assemblages of prehistoric material in the Buffalo National River.

The site was listed on the National Register of Historic Places in 1976 (under its Smithsonian trinomial designation, "3SE33").

== See also ==
- National Register of Historic Places listings in Searcy County, Arkansas
