= Layton Building =

- U.S. National Register of Historic Places
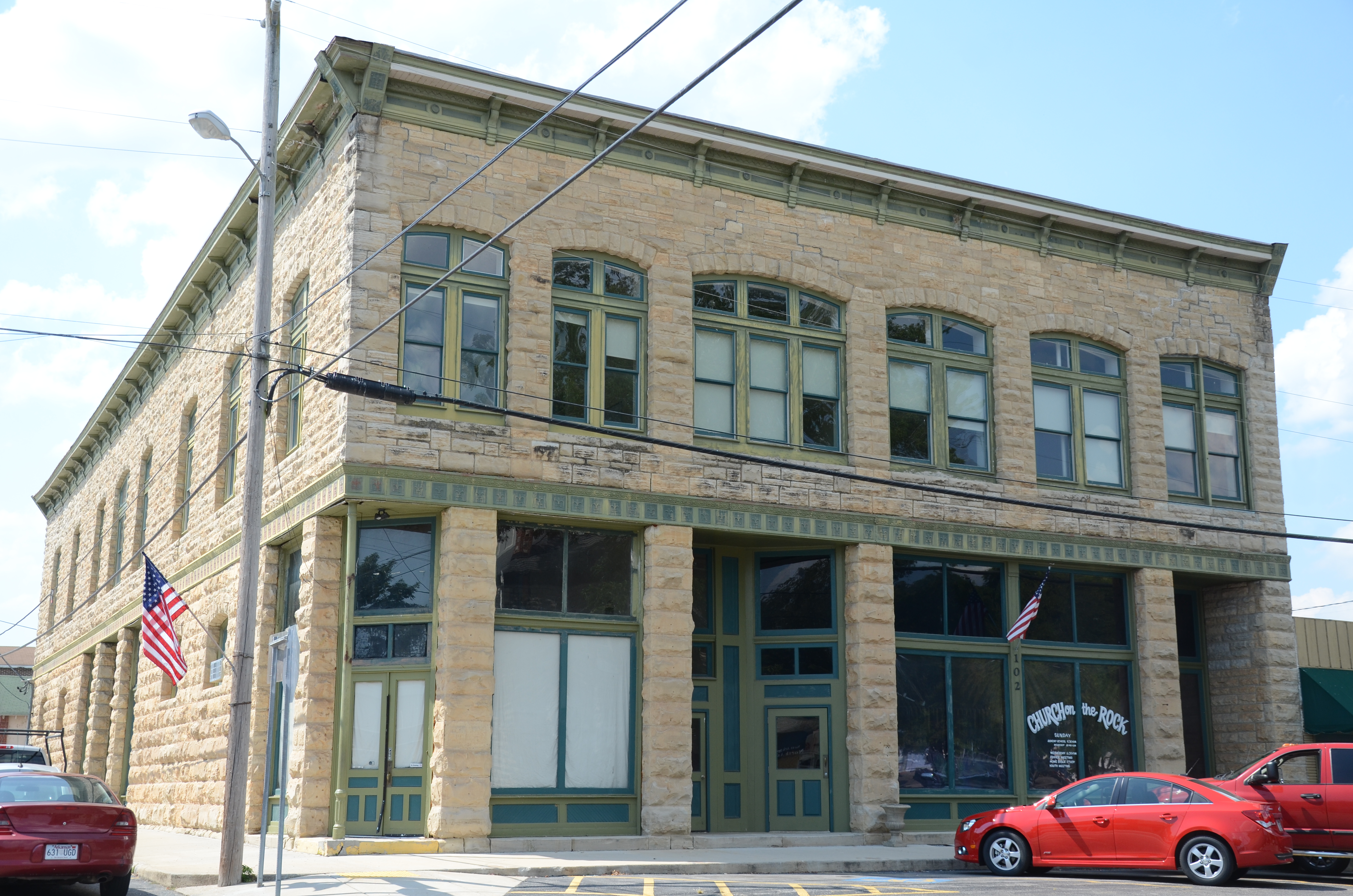

- Location within Arkansas Location within the United States
- Location: 1110 Mill St., Yellville, Arkansas
- Coordinates: 36°13′32″N 92°40′57″W
- Area: less than one acre
- Built: 1906
- Built by: C.A. Jones
- NRHP reference No.: 78000610
- Added to NRHP: April 26, 1978

The Layton Building is a historic commercial building at 1110 Mill Street in downtown Yellville, Arkansas. Built in 1906, this rusticated stone two-story building is one of the largest in Marion County. It has five irregularly-sized bays on the first floor and six on the second. The entrances to the storefronts are set inward at a 45-degree angle. There are decorative metal cornices between the floors and at the roof line. The building's original commercial tenants were the Bank of Yellville and the Layton Department Store; the bank's vault is still in the building.

The building was listed on the National Register of Historic Places in 1978.

== See also ==
- National Register of Historic Places listings in Marion County, Arkansas
