= May Farmstead =

Historic house in Arkansas, United States

- U.S. National Register of Historic Places
- Location within Arkansas Location within the United States
- Nearest city: Bass, Arkansas
- Coordinates: 35.93725°N 92.97683°W
- Area: 4 acres (1.6 ha)
- Built: 1880
- Architectural style: Double Pen
- NRHP reference No.: 99001470
- Added to NRHP: December 9, 1999

The May Farmstead is a historic farm property in rural eastern Newton County, Arkansas. It is located overlooking Cave Creek, off County Road 256 east of Bens Branch Church. The main house is a double-pen, one built out of logs in 1880, the other framed in 1910. The house is sheathed in weatherboard siding added after the construction of the second pen, and there is a full-width porch extending across the front (southeastern) facade. The property also includes a period barn and spring house. It is one of the best surviving examples of a late 19th-century farmstead in the region.

The property was listed on the National Register of Historic Places in 1999.

== See also ==
- National Register of Historic Places listings in Newton County, Arkansas
