= Buffalo River Trail =

Hiking and backpacking trail in Arkansas

Coordinates: 35°56′45″N 93°23′54″W

- BRT near Steel Creek Campground
- Location: Arkansas, United States
- Difficulty: moderate to strenuous
- Maintainer: National Park Service, Ozark Highlands Trail Association
- Website: www.nps.gov/thingstodo/hike-the-buffalo-river-trail.htm

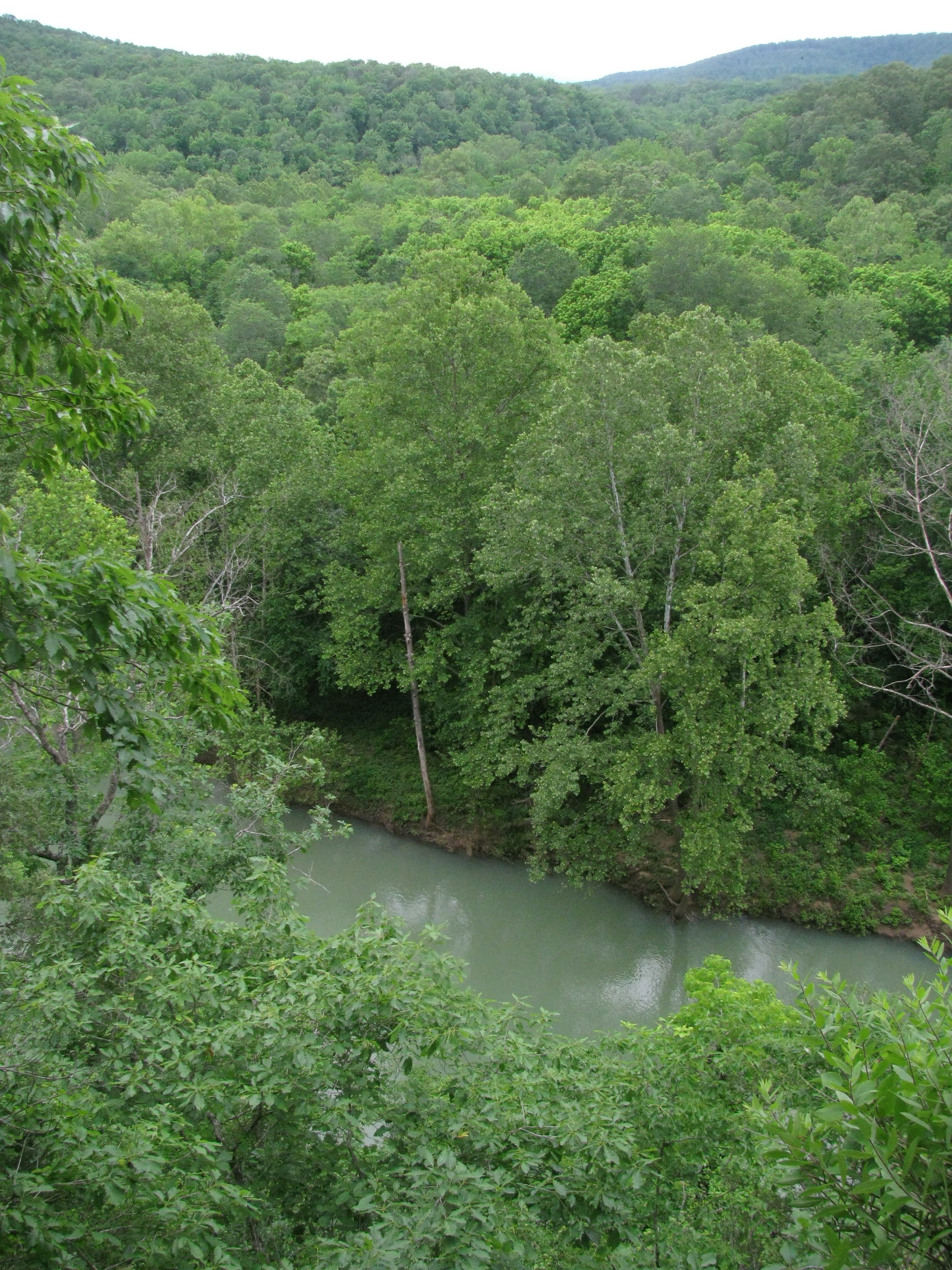
View from the trail looking down on the Buffalo

The Buffalo River Trail is a hiking and backpacking trail that follows the path of the Buffalo National River in Arkansas. It consists of two separate sections that are referred to as the Western and Eastern sections. The Western Section (upper river section) is from Boxley Valley to Pruitt. The Eastern Section (middle, lower river section) is from Woolum Ford to Highway 14 (Dillard's Ferry). The Ozark Highlands Trail joins the Eastern Section of the Buffalo River Trail at Woolum Ford so it is officially designated the Buffalo River/Ozark Highlands Trail.

== Course ==
The trail follows the path of the Buffalo National River in Arkansas and traverses the rugged Buffalo River country. The route stays on the south side of the river to avoid river crossings.
Western Section

- Mileage: 37 miles
- Trailheads: Boxley Valley (western terminus), Ponca, Steel Creek, Kyles Landing, Erbie, Ozark, and Pruitt (eastern terminus).

Eastern Section Now open from Hwy. 65 to Hwy. 14. about 42.8 miles.

- This section is also an extension of the Ozark Highlands Trail and maintenance is by the Ozark Highlands Trail Association.
- Segments:
  - Woolum Ford (western terminus) to Collier Homestead/Tyler Bend. 12.5 miles
  - Collier Homestead to Grinders Ferry. 2 miles
  - Grinder's Ferry to Zack Ridge Road. 6.6 miles.
  - Zack Ridge Road to Red Bluff Road. 4.5 miles.
  - Red Bluff Road to South Maumee Road. 6.2 miles
  - South Maumee Road to Spring Creek Road. 5.1 miles
  - Spring Creek Road to Highway 14/Dillard's Ferry (eastern terminus). 5.9 miles.
- Trailheads: Woolum Ford, Collier Homestead/Tyler Bend, Grinder's Ferry, Zack Ridge Rd., Red Bluff Rd., South Maumee, Spring Creed Rd, and Highway 14/Dillard's Ferry

The length and views make the trail a popular choice for backpackers, who can camp at dispersed backcountry sites along the trail or at one of the developed campgrounds, such as Steel Creek and Kyle's Landing, which are reported to be the busiest. ("Backpack Trail Guide: Buffalo River Trail: Ponca to Kyles Landing".)

== Development ==
The trail is being developed as a cooperative effort of the NPS and volunteers. Kenneth L. Smith is the trail building volunteer coordinator. Spring work season is mid-March through early April. Fall work season is mid-October to early November.

=== History ===
In 1986 Kenneth L. Smith began his work as coordinator for development of the Buffalo River Trail.

The gap between the Western and Eastern Section is due to The Wilderness and Backcountry Management Plan released by the park service in 1994 which restricted development in areas designated as wilderness.

==== Western Section ====
Construction began on the Western Section in 1980 and by 1994 half of the 37 miles were completed.

==== Eastern Section ====
The Woolum Ford to Tyler Bend segment was completed in 1991 and the South Maumee to Hwy 14/Dillards Ferry segment was completed in 2010.
Ozark Highlands Trail Association volunteers built a 20 ft. bridge across a gulley near the Grinder's Ferry trailhead in 2015.

== Features ==
Sites on the trail include expansive views from atop bluff cliffs, abandoned homestead sites, vestiges of Civil War-era mining and logging activities and a wide variety of Ozark flora and fauna.

== Guidebooks ==
"Buffalo River Handbook" by Kenneth L. Smith, University of Arkansas Press.
"Buffalo River Trails" by Tim Ernst, Cloudland Publishing.

== Access ==
The Buffalo Outdoor Center in Ponca, AR offers a vehicle shuttle service for point-to-point hikers.
