= J.C. Berry's Dry Goods Store =

- U.S. National Register of Historic Places
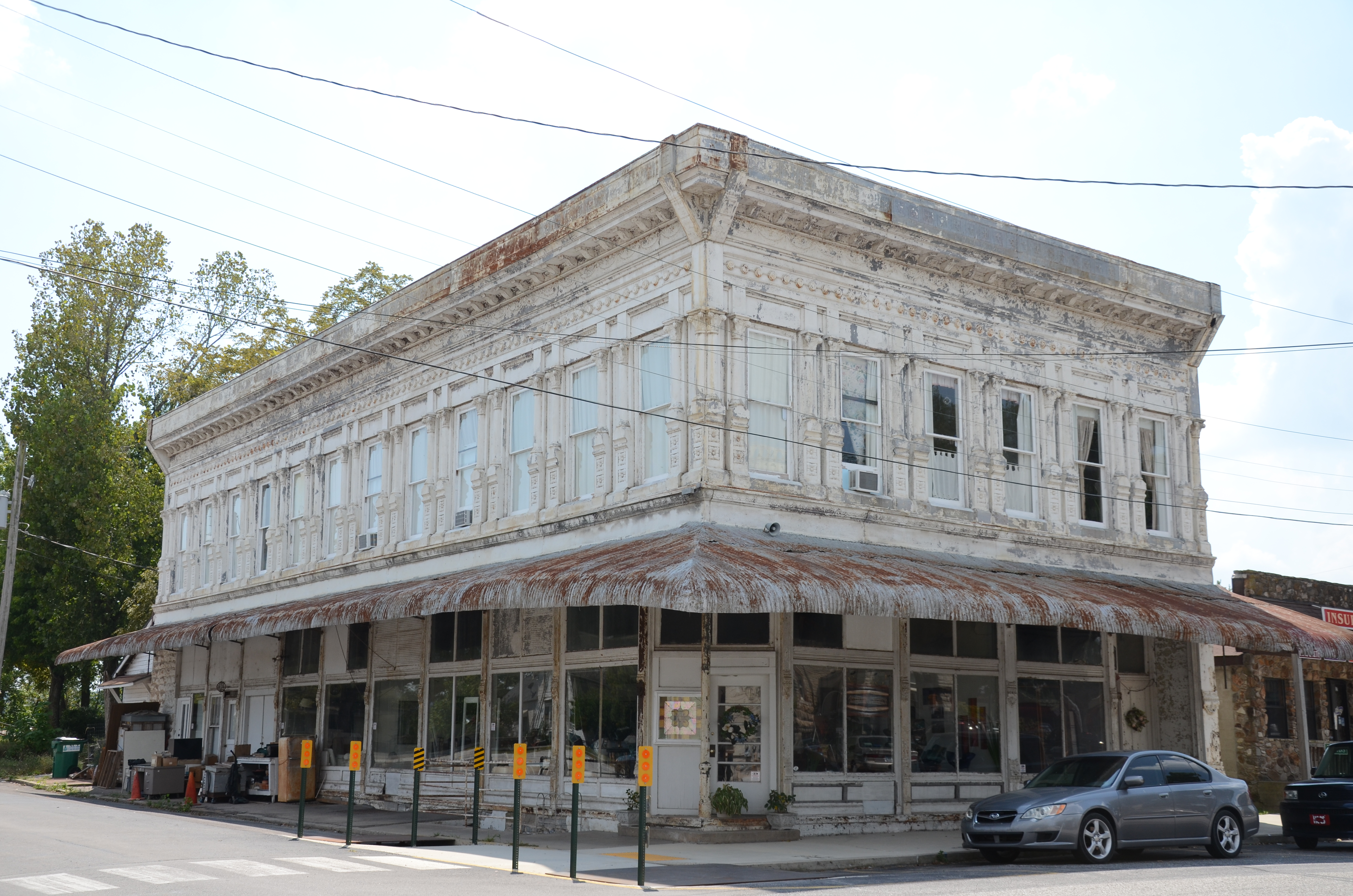

- Location within Arkansas Location within the United States
- Location: 331 Old South Main St., Yellville, Arkansas
- Coordinates: 36°13′29″N 92°40′53″W
- Area: less than one acre
- Built: 1903
- Architectural style: Early Commercial
- NRHP reference No.: 03000468
- Added to NRHP: May 30, 2003

J.C. Berry's Dry Goods Store is a historic commercial building at 331 Old South Main Street in Yellville, Arkansas. It is a two-story block, built out of local limestone with pressed metal trim. The ground floor has a glass commercial store front, sheltered by a porch, and the second story has a bank of six windows, each flanked by a pair of Ionic pilasters. The roof has an extended overhang supported by brackets, and a highly decorated parapet. The metal elements of the facade were manufactured by the Mesker Brothers, a nationally known producer of metal architectural goods based in St. Louis, Missouri. The building was built in 1903 by J.C. Berry, and was operated as a dry goods business until 1912, when Berry's nephew Rex Floyd converted it for use as a hotel after his Park Hotel burned down. The hotel closed in 1952, and the building has seen a succession of mixed commercial and residential uses.

The building was listed on the National Register of Historic Places in 2003.

== See also ==
- National Register of Historic Places listings in Marion County, Arkansas
