= Villines Mill =

- U.S. National Register of Historic Places
- U.S. Historic district – Contributing property
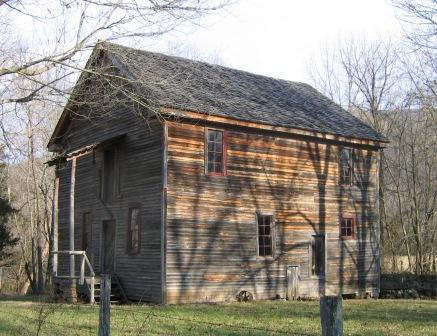

- Location within Arkansas Location within the United States
- Nearest city: Boxley, Arkansas
- Coordinates: 35°59′18″N 93°23′58″W
- Built: 1870
- Part of: Big Buffalo Valley Historic District (ID87000110)
- NRHP reference No.: 74000482

Significant dates
- Added to NRHP: July 31, 1974
- Designated CP: July 29, 1987

Villines Mill, also known as Boxley Mill or Whiteley Mill, was originally built around 1840 by Abner Casey in the Buffalo River valley, in what is now known as the Buffalo National River. After becoming known as Whiteley Mill, the mill was at the center of a Civil War skirmish known as the Battle of Whiteley's Mill. The mill was rebuilt in 1870 and replaced with a larger mill, becoming known as Villines Mill after the new owner. After three generations of Villines, the mill closed in the 1960s. The mill is included in the Big Buffalo Valley Historic District.

== See also ==
- National Register of Historic Places listings in Newton County, Arkansas
