= Rush Historic District =

Historic district in Arkansas, United States

- U.S. National Register of Historic Places
- U.S. Historic district
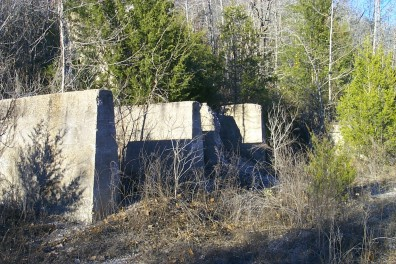

- Location within Arkansas Location within the United States
- Location: Marion County, Arkansas
- Nearest city: Yellville, Arkansas
- Coordinates: 36°07′57″N 92°34′16″W
- Area: 1,316 acres (533 ha)
- NRHP reference No.: 87000105
- Added to NRHP: February 27, 1987

The Rush Historic District is a zinc mining region of the Ozark Mountains in Arkansas. Now located within Buffalo National River, the district includes ruins dating from 1880 to 1940. The area was an important part of what became known as the North Arkansas Lead and Zinc District, and played a role in the development of railroads and modern infrastructure in the area.

During World War I the Rush Creek mines were the center of the zinc industry in Arkansas. Ten mining companies operated 13 developed mines within the district, more than in any other mining district within the North Arkansas District.

The buildings, structures, and ruins at Rush are the last visible remains of historic zinc mining activity in Arkansas. Of the other mining districts which once stretched across northern Arkansas, only limited debris now marks those sites. Rush is the only area left to retain not only the mines, but also buildings, structures, and ruins pertaining to mining and community life. The Rush Historic District exists today within the same environment and setting as it did during its periods of historic significance. Nearly as isolated today as it was historically, it has been little touched by time. The ghost town, mines, and waste piles visible on the bluffs immediately set the flavor of the district as an abandoned mountain mining community. The buildings, structures, ruins, and sites in the district exist in the same relationships as they did during the mining era.

The district was listed on the National Register of Historic Places in 1987.

== See also ==
- Buffalo River State Park Historic District
- Big Buffalo Valley Historic District
- Parker-Hickman Farm Historic District
- National Register of Historic Places listings in Marion County, Arkansas
