= Buffalo River State Park (Arkansas) =

- U.S. National Register of Historic Places
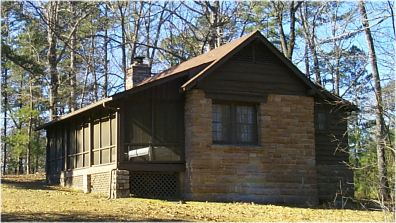

- Location within Arkansas Location within the United States
- Nearest city: Yellville, Arkansas
- Coordinates: 36°4′41″N 92°34′6″W
- Area: 35 acres (14 ha)
- Built: 1939
- Architect: Civilian Conservation Corps
- NRHP reference No.: 78003461
- Added to NRHP: October 20, 1988

Buffalo River State Park was an Arkansas state park, established in 1938, that was absorbed into Buffalo National River when the Federal park was established in 1972. The area is now known as Buffalo Point. The new state park was developed with Civilian Conservation Corps labor in 1939 with the construction of park structures to plans from the National Park Service Branch of Plans and Designs. The CCC structures now comprise a historic district on the National Register of Historic Places.

One park highlight is a three-mile trail. The Indian Rockhouse Trail is scenic with many points of interest including sculpted bedrock, a waterfall, a former zinc mine, and the Indian Rockhouse Cave.

== See also ==
- Big Buffalo Valley Historic District
- Rush Historic District
- Parker-Hickman Farm Historic District
- National Register of Historic Places listings in Marion County, Arkansas
