= Newton County Courthouse (Arkansas) =

- U.S. National Register of Historic Places
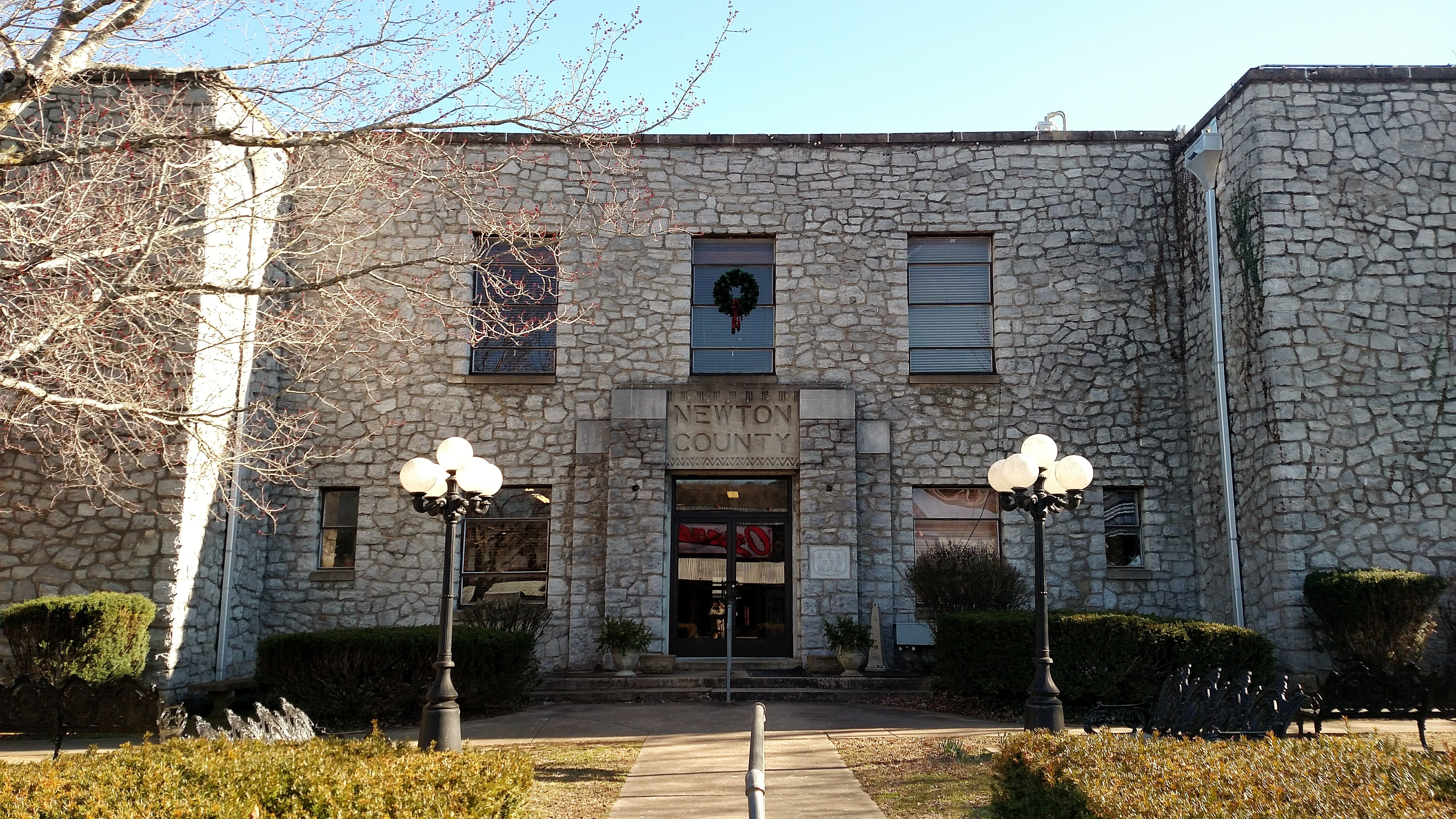

- Location within Arkansas Location within the United States
- Interactive map showing the location of Newton County Courthouse
- Location: Courthouse Sq., Jasper, Arkansas
- Coordinates: 36°0′29″N 93°11′13″W
- Area: less than one acre
- Built: 1939
- Architect: WPA
- Architectural style: Art Deco
- NRHP reference No.: 94001412
- Added to NRHP: December 1, 1994

The Newton County Courthouse is located at Courthouse Square in the center of Jasper, the county seat of Newton County, Arkansas. It is a two-story masonry structure, constructed out of concrete and limestone, with restrained Art Deco styling. The building has an H shape, with a center section joining flanking projecting wings. The entrance is at the center, with "Newton County" inscribed in a panel above it, with stylized Art Deco elements. It was built in 1939 with funding from the Works Progress Administration. The building was listed on the National Register of Historic Places in 1994.

Billing itself the "Elk Capital of Arkansas", Jasper worked with Newton County in 2017 to build a large elk statue on the courthouse lawn. Elk were native to Arkansas but had been hunted to extinction locally by the 1840s. Elk were reintroduced to the Boxley Valley area in 1981 in a cooperative program run by several agencies with local landowners. Elk hunting licenses were issued in 1998.

== Gallery ==
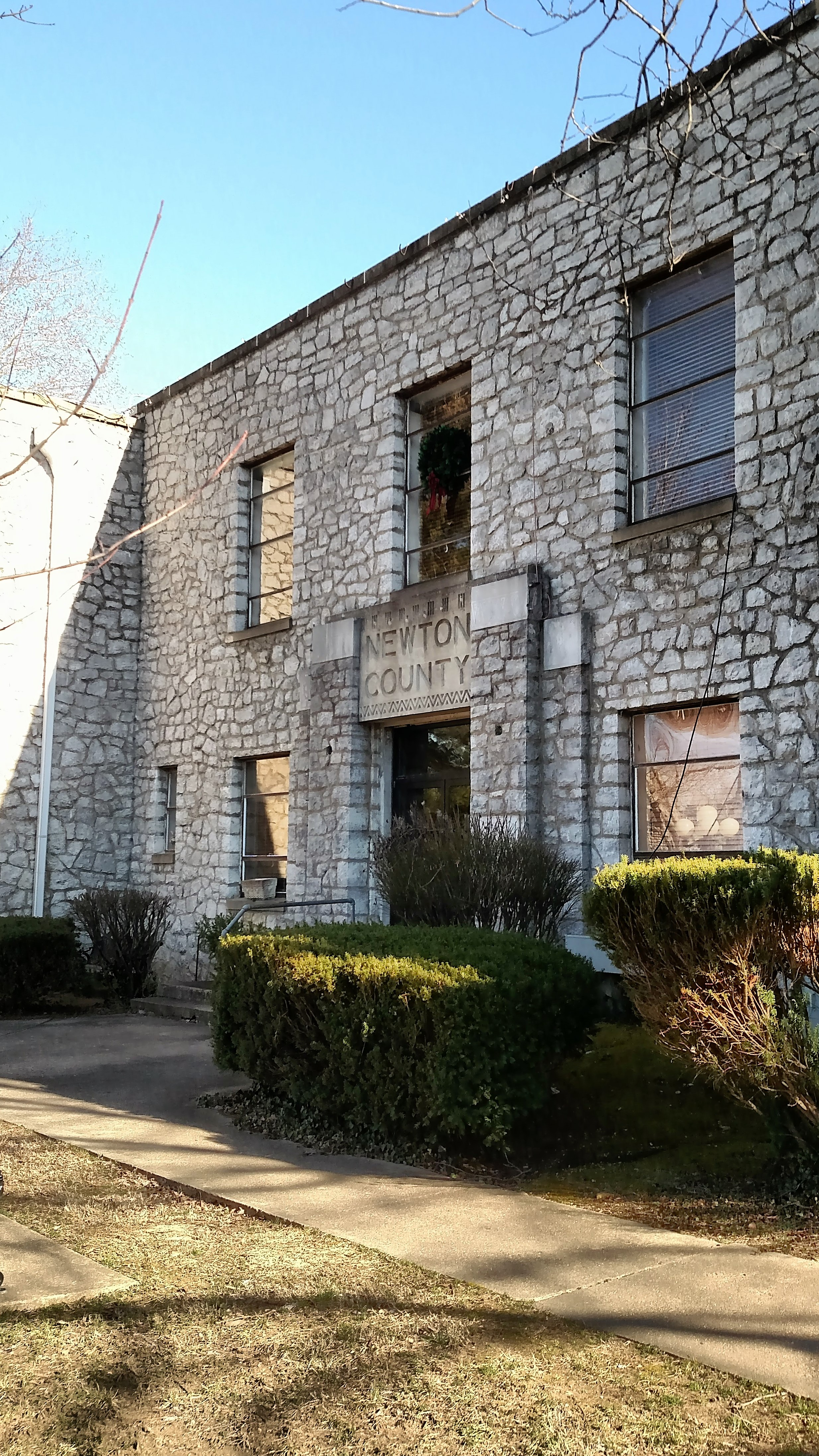
Façade

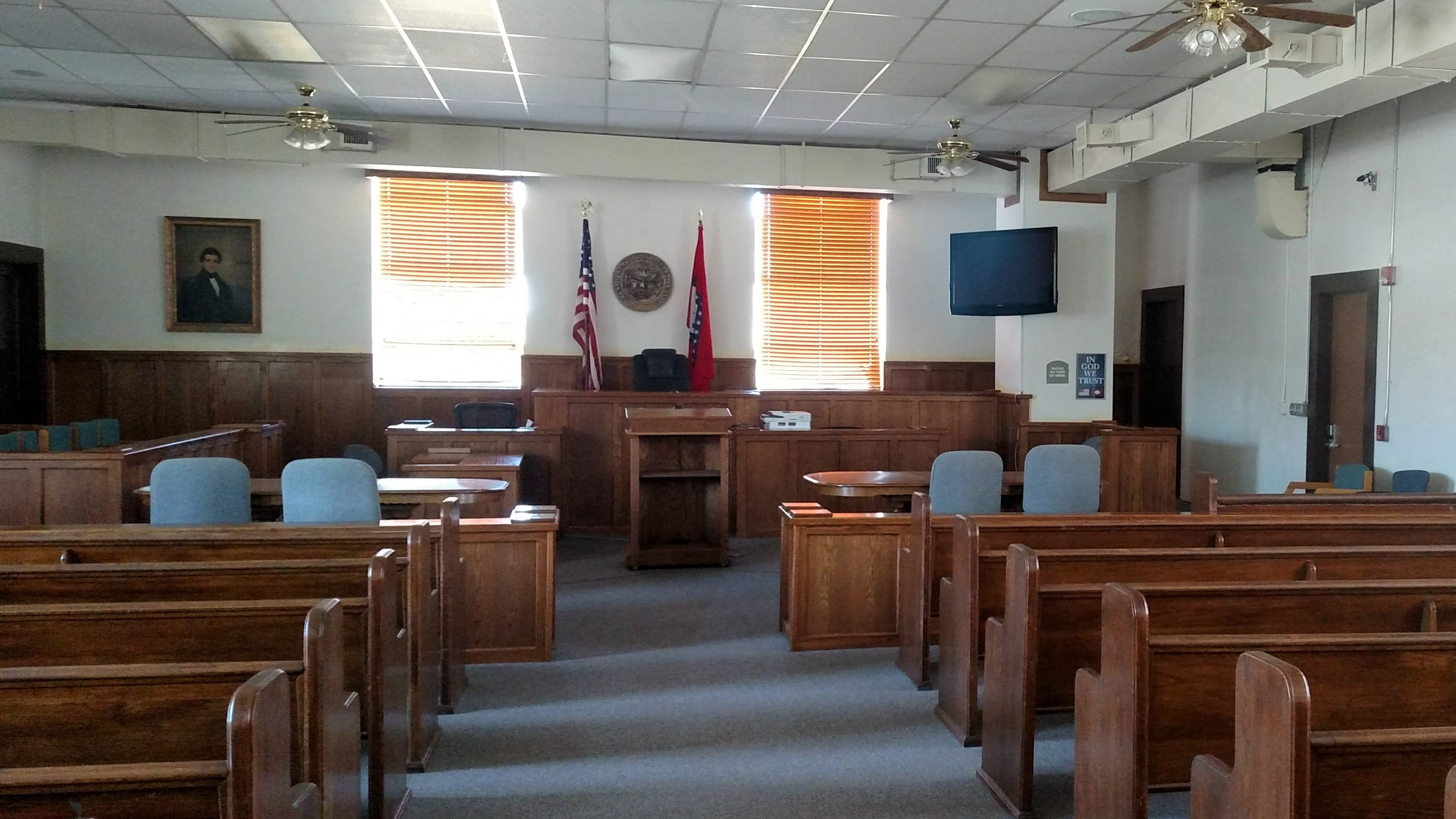
Courtroom

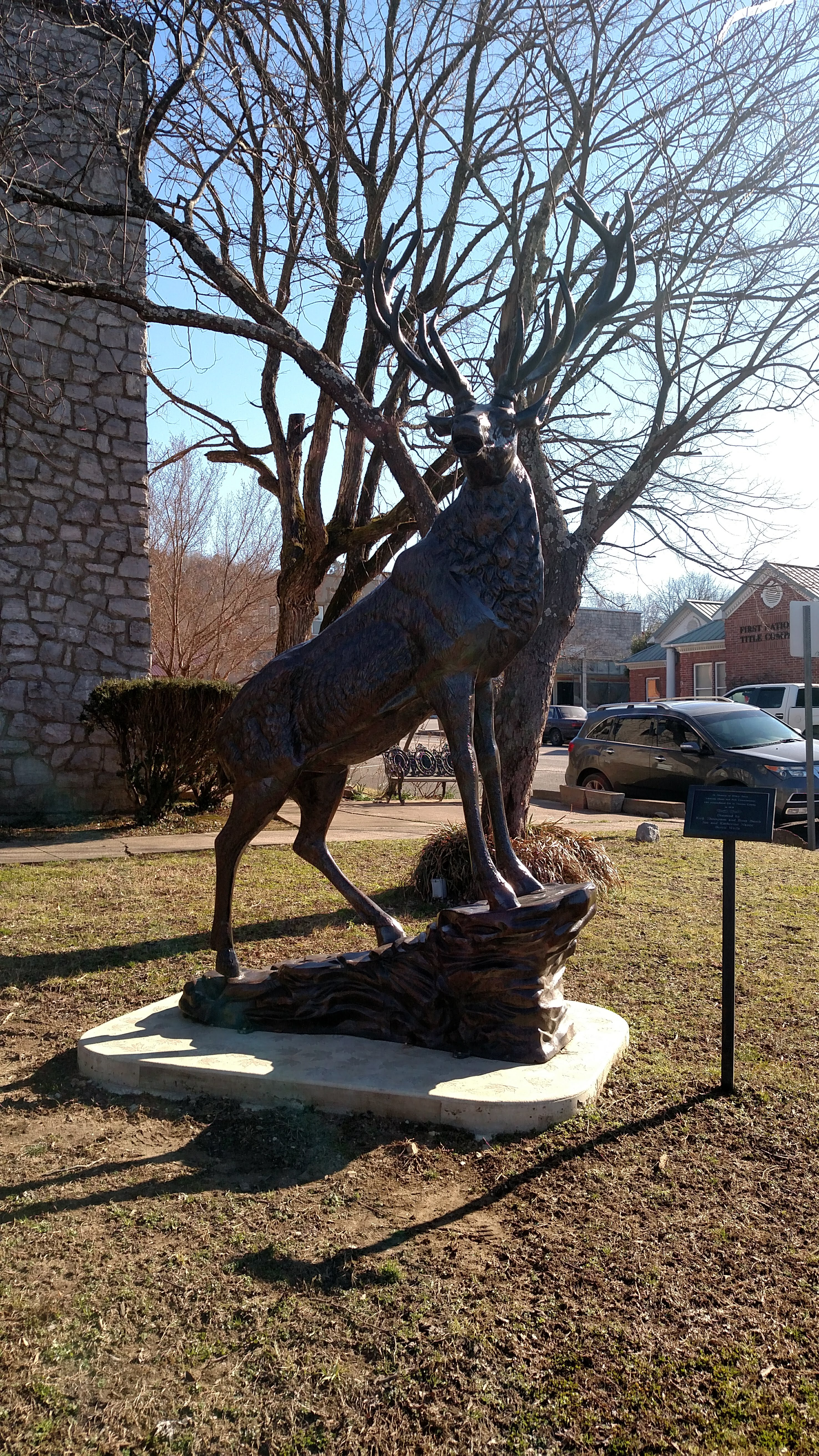
Elk statue

== See also ==
- National Register of Historic Places listings in Newton County, Arkansas
