= Parker–Hickman Farm Historic District =

Historic district in Arkansas, United States

- U.S. National Register of Historic Places
- U.S. Historic district
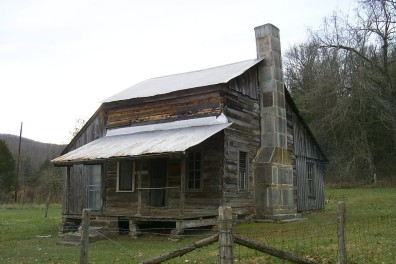

- Location within Arkansas Location within the United States
- Location: Buffalo National River, Newton County, Arkansas, USA
- Nearest city: Jasper, Arkansas
- Coordinates: 36°4′16″N 93°13′18″W
- Built: 1850
- NRHP reference No.: 87001029
- Added to NRHP: August 11, 1987

The Parker–Hickman Farm includes the oldest standing log structure in Buffalo National River. The farm was homesteaded in the 1840s by settlers from Tennessee. It embodies an agricultural landscape with farmstead, extant fields (bench and bottomland), fencerows, roads, cattle gates, garden and orchard plots, wooded slopes and springs. Unlike most farms in the Ozarks the landscape is remarkably intact and provides insights and evidence spanning portions of two centuries of Ozark history; not randomly chosen, it conveys a feeling of enclosure and exemplifies adaptive use of topography. Among farms of its kind in Missouri and Arkansas it was once typical but now survives as a rare baseline example for Ozark yeomanry farms of mixed economies. Parker–Hickman was an agricultural enterprise that continuously operated until 1982 from a farmstead which exemplifies the entire period, and a rare one for the Ozarks since it survives. Clustered around the farmstead are several structures: barns, sheds smokehouse, privy, fences, stock feeders and house that represent a cross-section of rural vernacular architecture still in their original location.

Although other farms in the Ozark–Ouachita region had similar origins, with settlement patterns that evolved from subsistence to commercial agriculture, the Parker–Hickman farm is important because it survived intact. Until purchased by the National Park Service the Parker–Hickman farm continued uninterrupted as an agricultural enterprise for more than one hundred forty-five years, a rare intact survival of a typical southern upland farm in the Ozark–Ouachita region.

== See also ==
- Buffalo River State Park Historic District
- Rush Historic District
- Big Buffalo Valley Historic District
- National Register of Historic Places listings in Newton County, Arkansas
