= Pyatt School Building =

United States historic place in Pyatt, Arkansas

- U.S. National Register of Historic Places
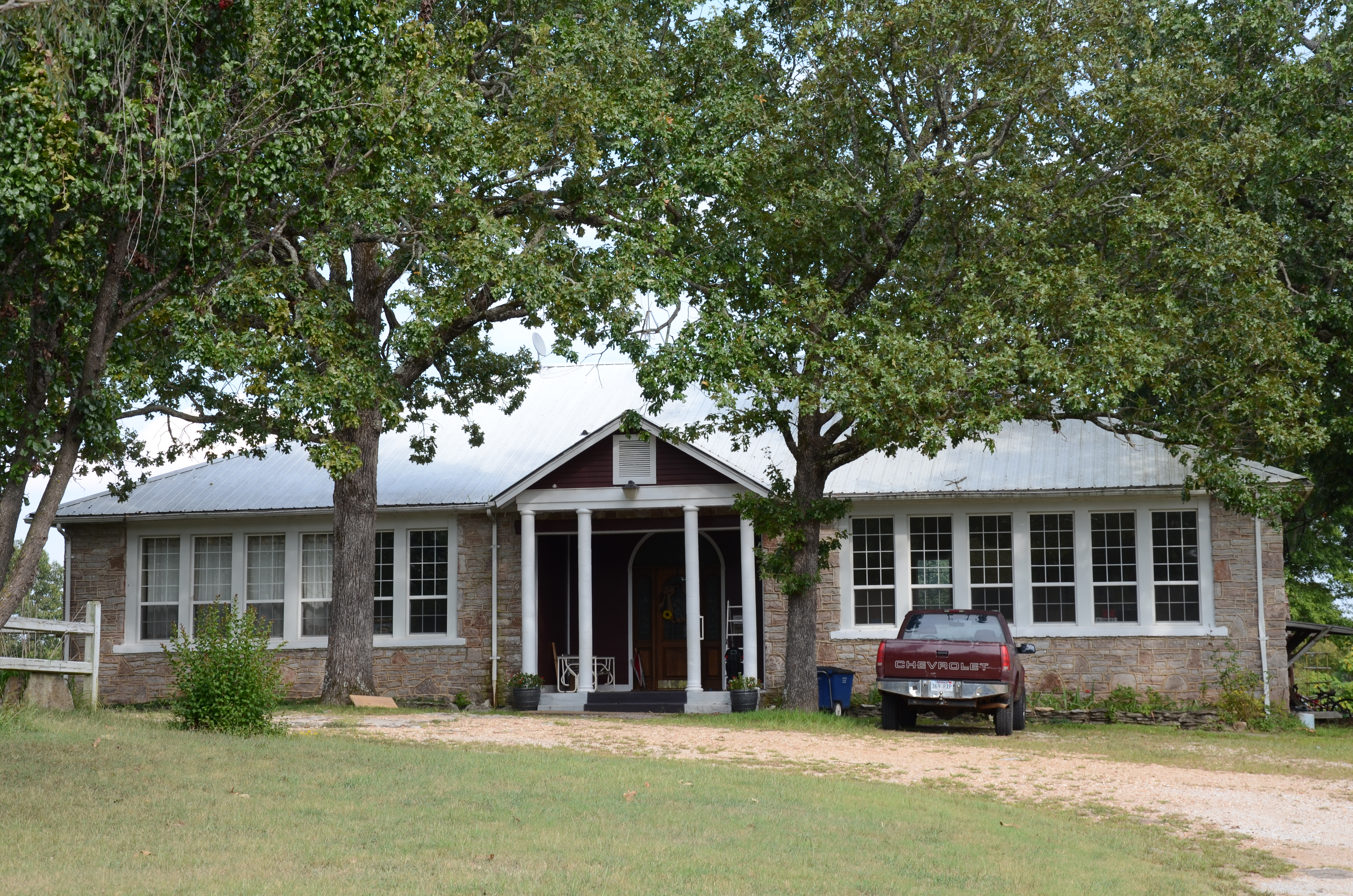

- Location within Arkansas Location within the United States
- Location: Old Schoolhouse Road, Pyatt, Arkansas
- Coordinates: 36°14′38″N 92°50′42″W
- Area: less than one acre
- Architectural style: Late 19th And Early 20th Century American Movements, Colonial Revival, Plain Traditional
- MPS: Public Schools in the Ozarks MPS
- NRHP reference No.: 92001111
- Added to NRHP: September 4, 1992

The Pyatt School Building is a historic school building on Old Schoolhouse Road (near United States Route 62) in Pyatt, Arkansas. It is a single-story stone structure, with a hip roof that extended eaves and exposed rafter tails in the Craftsman style, and a Colonial Revival recessed entry sheltered by a gable-roof portico. The school was built in 1925, as the community was adjusting to a decline of a mining boom begun in the 1910s.

The building was listed on the National Register of Historic Places in 1992.

== See also ==
- National Register of Historic Places listings in Marion County, Arkansas
