= Big Buffalo Valley Historic District =

Historic district in Arkansas, United States

- U.S. National Register of Historic Places
- U.S. Historic district
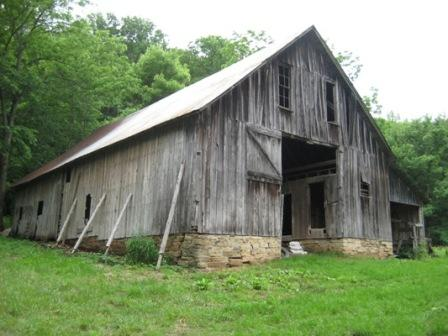
- Orphea Duty barn

- Location within Arkansas Location within the United States
- Nearest city: Ponca, Arkansas
- NRHP reference No.: 87000110
- Added to NRHP: July 29, 1987

The Big Buffalo Valley Historic District, also known as the Boxley Valley Historic District, is notable as a cultural landscape in Buffalo National River. It comprises the Boxley Valley in northern Arkansas, near the town of Ponca. The valley includes a number of family-operated farms, primarily dating between 1870 and 1930. The farms are situated on either side of the road that parallels the river, Highway 43. Many of these farms are still operated by the descendants of the original homesteaders. However, of fifty residences in the valley, thirty were vacant in 1987, at the time of historic designation.

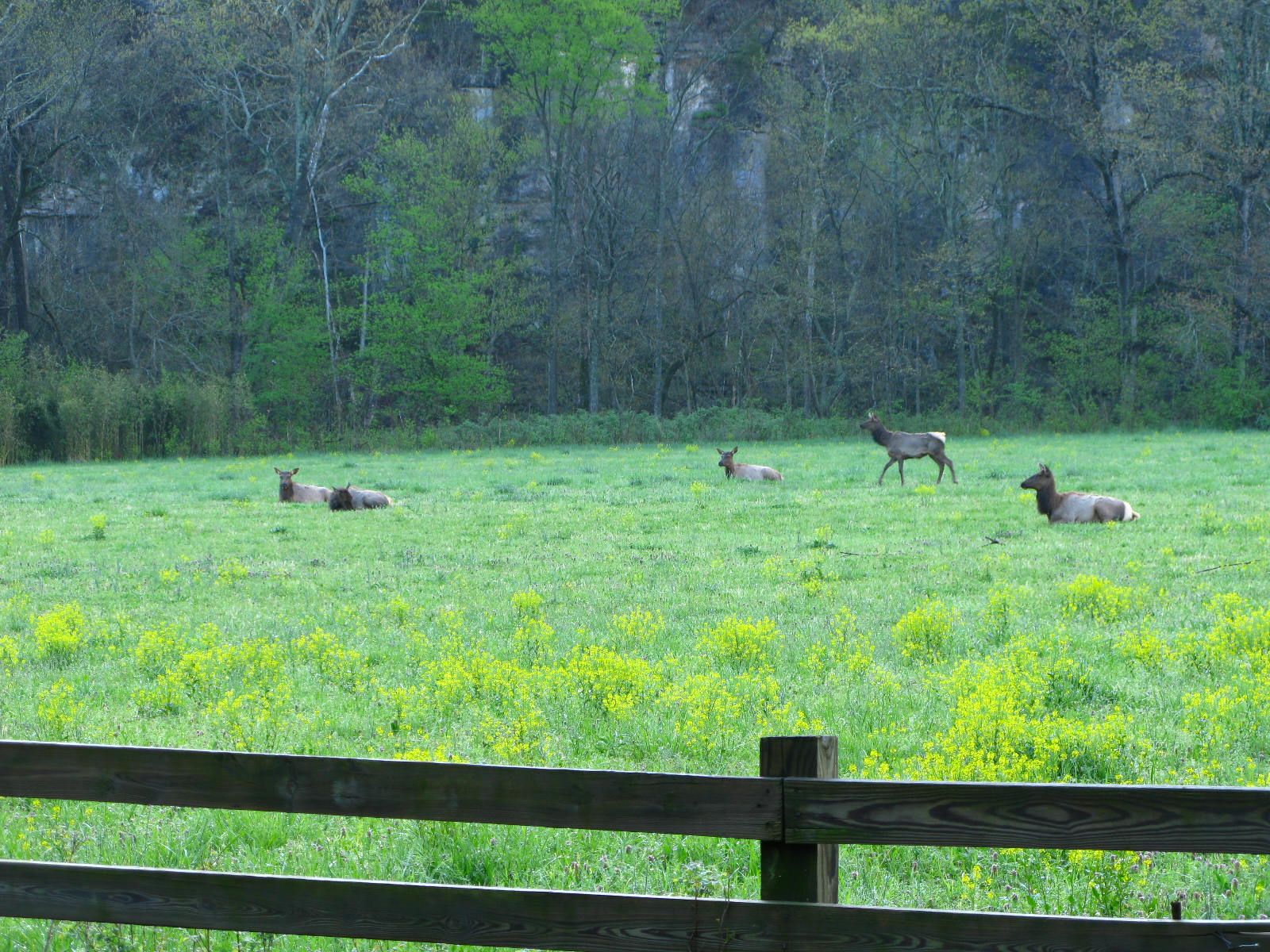
Elk out in the early morning in Boxley Valley

Structures in the valley have been classified into three historical phases:

- The Old-Ozarks-Frontier phase, comprising the period of the 1830s to the 1870s, focusing on settlement and homesteading, with a continuing tradition of log construction extending to the 1930s.
- The Cosmopolitan-Ozarks phase, from circa 1895 to 1950, in which a more urban style was used for housing, with large barns and the appearance of specialized buildings for shops and services.
- The New-Ozarks-Frontier phase, from 1950 to the present, with a suburban design influence.

The district includes Villines Mill, listed separately on the National Register of Historic Places.

== See also ==
- Buffalo River State Park Historic District
- Rush Historic District
- Parker-Hickman Farm Historic District
- National Register of Historic Places listings in Newton County, Arkansas
