= Buffalo National River =

Coordinates: 36°10′41″N 92°25′34″W

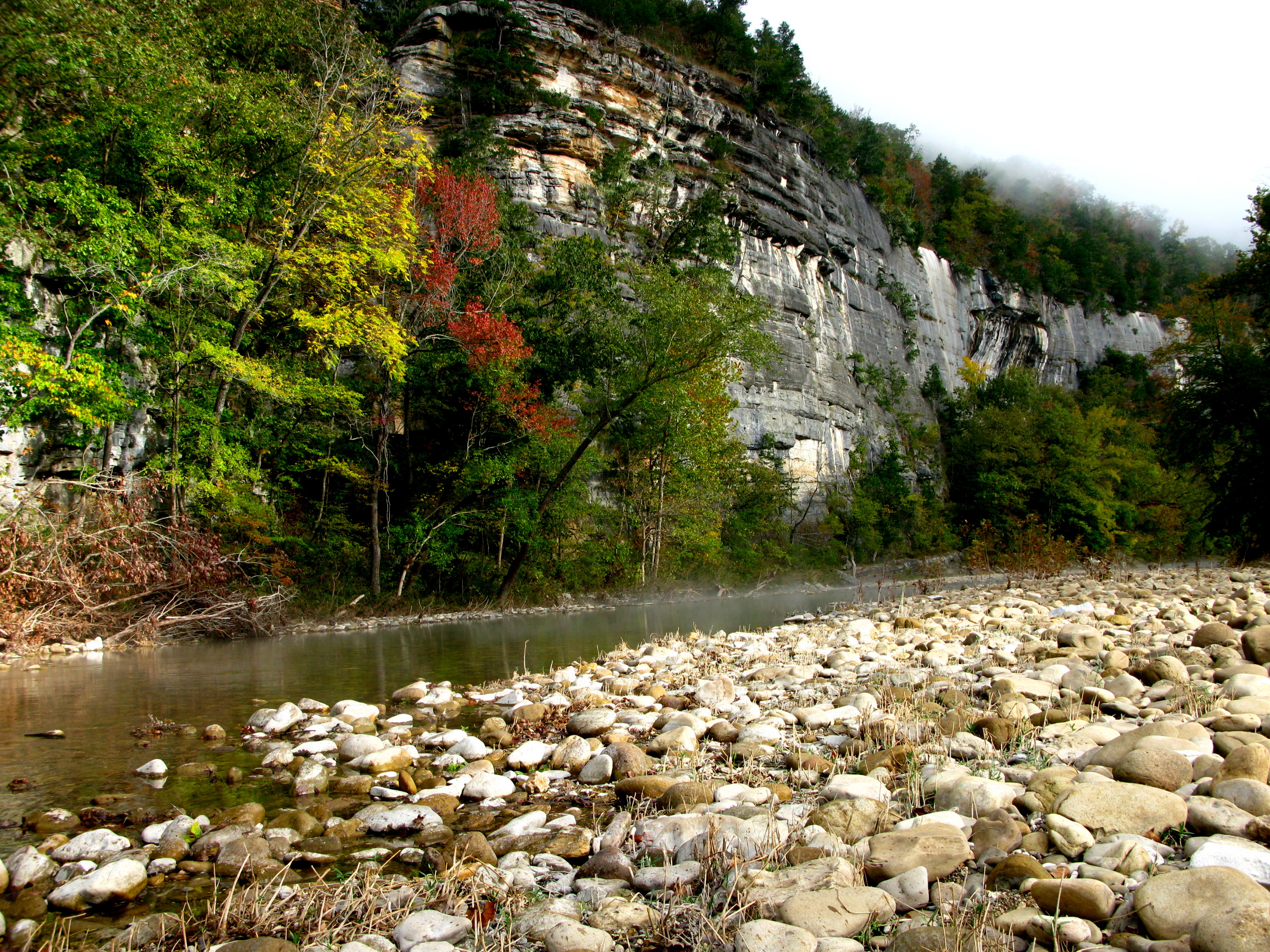
- Buffalo National River, Arkansas

Physical characteristics
- Length: 153 mi (246 km)
- Discharge
  - location: Harriet, AR
  - average: 1,355 cu. ft. per sec.

National Wild and Scenic River
- Type: Wild, Scenic
- Designated: April 22, 1992

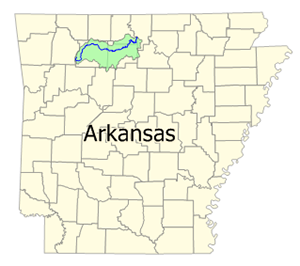
Location of the Buffalo River and Watershed.

The Buffalo National River, in Northern Arkansas, was the first National River to be designated in the United States. The Buffalo River is 153 miles (246 km) long. The lower 135 miles (217 km) flow within the boundaries of an area managed by the National Park Service, where the stream is designated the Buffalo National River. The river flows through Newton, Searcy, Marion, and Baxter Counties, from west to east. The river originates in the highest part of the Boston Mountains of the Ozarks, flows out onto the Springfield Plateau near the historic community of Erbie, and finally crosses a portion of the Salem Plateau just before joining the White River. The Park is home to the state's only elk herd. The upper section of the river in the Ozark National Forest is managed by the U.S. Forest Service and is designated as a National Wild and Scenic River.

== History ==
The Buffalo National River was established by an Act of Congress on March 1, 1972, ending the recurring plans of the U.S. Army Corps of Engineers to construct one or more dams on the river. The National River designation protects natural rivers from industrial uses, impoundments, and other obstructions that may change the natural character of the river or disrupt the natural habitat for the flora and fauna that live in or near the river. Three segments totaling 11,978 acres (48.47 km^{2}) were designated the Buffalo National River Wilderness in 1975.

In 2012, C&H Hog Farms was granted a permit to operate on a major tributary of the Buffalo River. The facility contained over 6,500 hogs, as well as storage areas for their manure. In 2019, the company reached a deal with the State of Arkansas to cease operations on the river. The then-governor of Arkansas, Asa Hutchinson, subsequently announced a moratorium on large confined animal feeding operations in the river's watershed. In January 2020, the Arkansas Legislature struck down rules set by Hutchison banning similar operations on the river.

== Description ==
At a point about 15 miles (24 km) above the Park boundary in Newton County, Arkansas, the Buffalo River begins as the Main Prong of Big Buffalo Creek. The river flows north through Boxley to Ponca, where it then begins an eastward trek across northern Arkansas to its confluence with the White River on the Marion-Baxter County line. Advanced canoeists and kayakers often refer to the 15-mile (24 km) section upriver from Boxley as the Hailstone River. This extremely challenging section of the river is floatable only during periods of high water and should be attempted only by those with solid whitewater skills.

Along the upper river, the gradient is steep and the water is fast, leveling and slowing as the river runs its course. The upper section has most of the whitewater rapids to be found along the river, and features dramatic karst topography including sink holes and caves, springs, and waterfalls, over 500-foot (150 m) tall sandstone and limestone bluffs, and many rock formations. At one point, a 0.65-mile (1.05 km) hike from the river up a narrow, boxed canyon leads to a 209-foot (64 m) waterfall, Hemmed-In-Hollow Falls, the highest of its kind between the Southern Appalachians and the Rockies. The river's current also gives life to well over 300 species of fish, insects, freshwater mussels, and aquatic plants.

The Buffalo National River is a popular camping, hiking, canoeing, and fishing destination. Visitors may bring their own canoes or rent from several independent concessioners. Camping is generally allowed throughout the park with the following exceptions: the Hemmed-in-Hollow area, on Big Bluff, in historical structures, on private property within the park, or within 100 feet (30 m) of any trail or watercourse. Camping is also permitted on gravel bars and sand bars along the river. The National Park Service has a number of "developed" campgrounds along the river.

The National Park Service headquarters for the Buffalo National River is located in Harrison, Arkansas.

== Major access areas ==
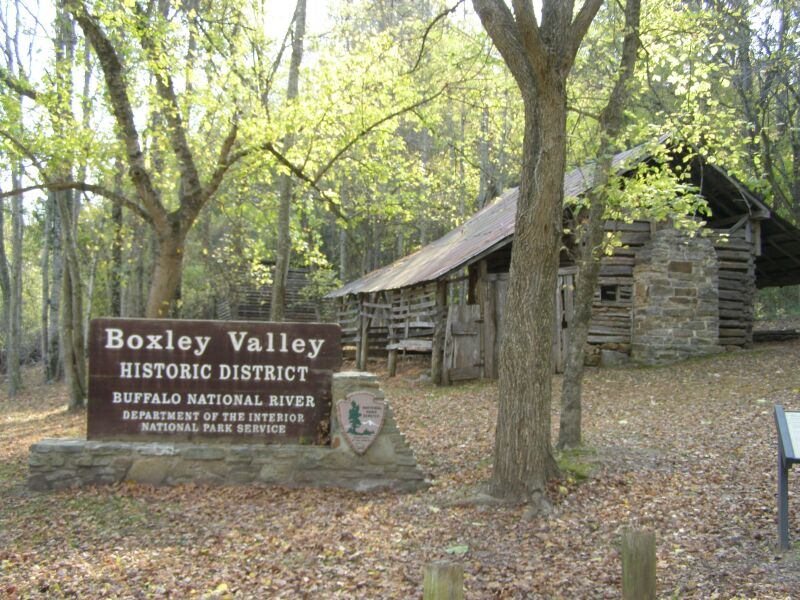
Boxley Valley Historic Area, Ponca (Jim Villines Homes)

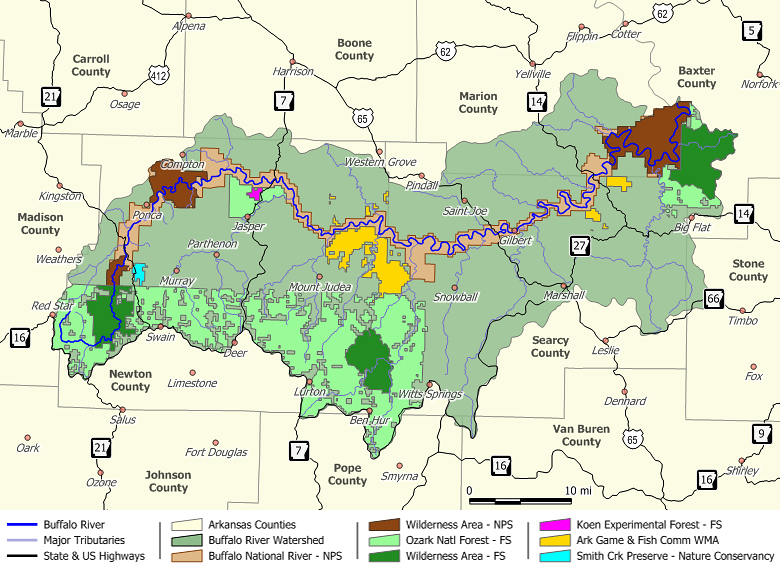
Buffalo River Watershed including National River and other State Government, Federal Government, and Nature Conservancy Managed Lands. Click to enlarge.

- Boxley Bridge – located on the upper end of the river along Arkansas Highway 21. Boxley provides access to the Upper Buffalo Wilderness Area within the Ozark National Forest. Provides river access
- Lost Valley - located on Arkansas Highway 43 between Arkansas 21 and Ponca.
- Ponca – Location of Beaver Jim Villines Boyhood Home. Ponca retains one of the old ‘low water’ bridges over the Buffalo. All boaters must portage over this barrier. Provides river access
- Steel Creek – is located on the upstream side of the Ponca section of the Wilderness. Provides river access
- Kyles Landing – is located on the downstream side and across the river from the Ponca Wilderness area. This area was once the home of early frontiersman David Conrad Hennegar "Coon" Arbaugh. Provides river access
- Erbie - Erbie retains one of the old ‘low water’ bridges over the Buffalo. Provides river access
- Ozark - Provides river access
- Pruitt Ranger Station – is on Arkansas Highway 7 at the top of the hill overlooking the picnic area and foot access to the river. For boat access, you need to cross the high bridge on Arkansas 7 and use Pruitt Landing.
- Pruitt Landing – is located just downstream from Pruitt Ranger Station. Provides river access
- Hasty – located off of Arkansas Highway 123, just south of the Hasty community. Provides river access
- Carver – located on Hwy 123 between Hasty and Piercetown (Arkansas Hwy 74). Provides river access
- Mount Hersey – is accessible from unimproved roads. From this access point, ‘Tha Nars’ (Narrows) and Skull Bluff are reached downstream. Provides river access
- Woolum - Provides river access
- Tyler Bend Visitor Center – is the primary public contact area. It's just off of U.S. 65. There is a full-service visitor center, picnic area, campground and ranger station. Provides river access Additionally, the ‘Colliers Homestead’ preserves a record of life in the mountains
- Grinders Ferry – is located at the Highway 65 Bridge over the Buffalo River. Provides river access
- Gilbert – is at the end of Arkansas Highway 333 a short 4 miles (6.4 km) off U.S. 65. Provides river access
- Maumee North – is on the north side of the river and west of Maumee South. It is accessed by an unimproved road. Provides river access
- Maumee South – is on the south side of the river and is accessed from an unimproved road beyond the end of the pavement on County Road 49.
- Dillards Ferry – is located on Arkansas Highway 14 at the bridge over the Buffalo River. Provides river access
- Buffalo Point Ranger Station – is at the end of the pavement on Arkansas Highway 268. Provides river access
- Rushland – is reached by an unimproved road beyond the end of the pavement on County 26. It provides access across the river to the Leatherwood Wilderness in the Ozark National Forest. Provides river access
- Buffalo City – is located outside the National River at the junction of the Buffalo River with its parent the White River. Buffalo City is located off the US 62–412 in Mountain Home on Arkansas Highway 162, about 12 miles from Mountain Home. Provides river access, primarily as the last take out for the Buffalo River along with boat rentals, camping, and cabins.

== See also ==
- Buffalo River Trail
- Buffalo River State Park Historic District
- Big Buffalo Valley Historic District
- Rush Historic District
- Parker-Hickman Farm Historic District
