= Arkansas Valley =

Arkansas Valley may refer to:

- the floodplain and associated areas along the Arkansas River in Colorado, Kansas, Oklahoma, and Arkansas
- Arkansas River Valley region in Arkansas
- Arkansas Valley (ecoregion), an ecoregion defined by the United States Environmental Protection Agency in Arkansas and Oklahoma
