= Boston Mountains =

Highland ecoregion in Arkansas and Oklahoma, United States

Coordinates: 35°47′28″N 93°6′24″W

Boston Mountains ecoregion
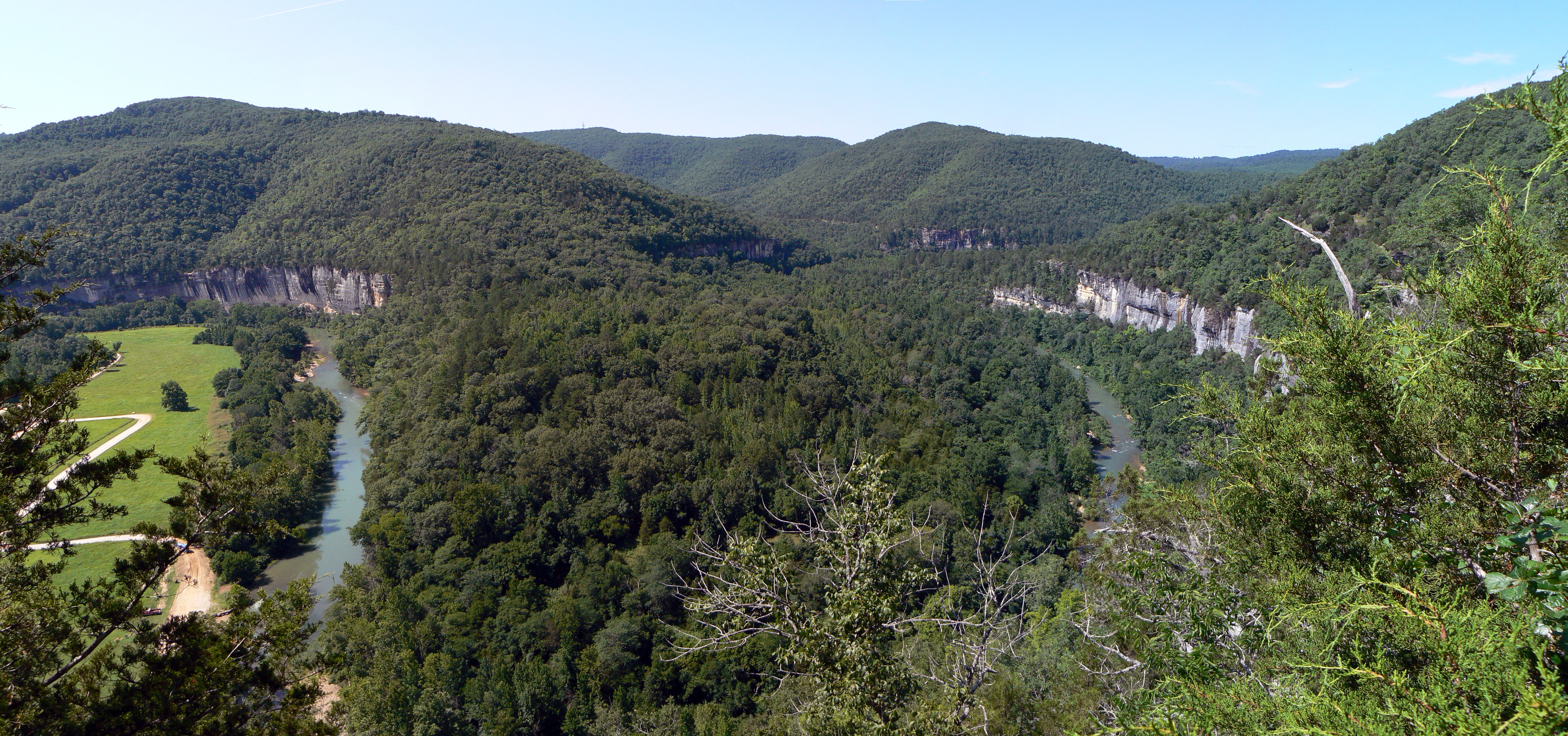
- View from Steel Creek Overlook on the Buffalo National River

- Level III ecoregions in the region, with the Boston Mountains ecoregion marked as (38) (full map)

Ecology
- Borders: Ozark Highlands (39); Arkansas Valley (37); Central Irregular Plains (40)

Geography
- Area: 14,190 km^{2} (5,480 mi^{2})
- Country: United States
- States: Arkansas; Oklahoma
- Climate type: Humid subtropical (Cwa)

The Boston Mountains is a Level III ecoregion designated by the Environmental Protection Agency (EPA) in the U.S. states of Arkansas and Oklahoma. Part of the Ozarks, the Boston Mountains are a deeply dissected plateau. The ecoregion is steeper than the adjacent Springfield Plateau to the north, and bordered on the south by the Arkansas Valley. The Oklahoma portion of the range is locally referred to as the Cookson Hills. There are several theories of how the mountains were named, though apparently none are related to the Massachusetts city.

The Boston Mountains ecoregion has been subdivided into two Level IV ecoregions.

== Description ==
The ecoregion is mountainous, forested, and underlain by Pennsylvanian sandstone, shale, and siltstone. It is one of the Ozark Plateaus; some folding and faulting has occurred but, in general, strata are much less deformed than in the Ouachita Mountains. Maximum elevations are higher, soils have a warmer temperature regime, and carbonate rocks are much less extensive than in the Ozark Highlands. Physiography is distinct from the Arkansas Valley. Upland soils are mostly Ultisols that developed under oak-hickory and oak-hickory-pine forests. Today, forests are still widespread; northern red oak, southern red oak, white oak, and hickories usually dominate the uplands, but shortleaf pine grows on drier, south- and west-facing slopes underlain by sandstone. Pastureland or hayland occur on nearly level ridgetops, benches, and valley floors. Population density is low; recreation, logging, and livestock farming are the primary land uses. Water quality in streams is generally exceptional; biochemical, nutrient, and mineral water quality parameter concentrations all tend to be very low. Fish communities are mostly composed of sensitive species; a diverse, often darter-dominated community occurs along with nearly equal proportions of minnows and sunfishes. During low flows, streams usually run clear but, during high flow conditions, turbidity in the Boston Mountains tends to be greater than in the Ouachitas. Summer flow in many small streams is limited or non-existent but isolated, enduring pools may occur.

== Geology and physiography ==
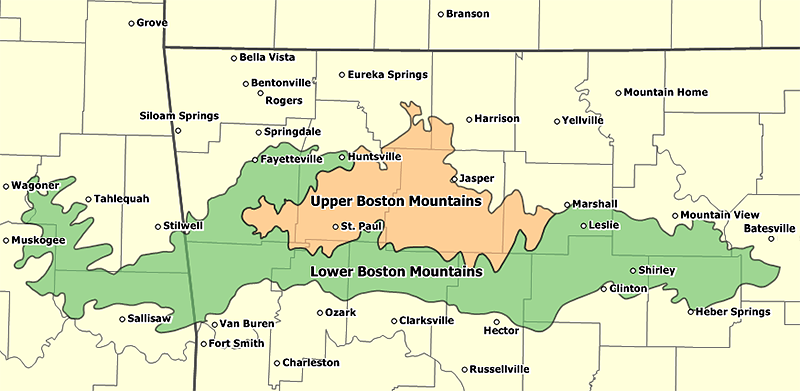
Boston Range spanning northwestern Arkansas and northeast Oklahoma

The Boston Mountains are a physiographic section of the larger Ozark Plateaus province, which in turn is part of the larger Interior Highlands physiographic division.

The area is underlain by Pennsylvanian sandstone, shale, and siltstone, where some folding and faulting has occurred. The sandstone beds become thinner with higher shale content in the west as the mountains decline in elevation.

The range covers an area of 5,770 square miles (14,900 km^{2}). The rocks of the region are essentially little disturbed, flat-lying sedimentary layers of the Paleozoic age. The highest ridges and peaks are capped by Pennsylvanian sandstone and shale. The deeply eroded valleys are cut into Mississippian limestones and below that layer Ordovician dolomites.

== General description ==
The Boston Mountains form the southwestern part of the Ozark plateau where they are the highest portion of the Ozarks. Summits can reach elevations of just over 2,560 feet (780 m) with valleys 500 feet (150 m) to 1,550 feet (470 m) deep. Wahzhazhe Summit (formerly known as Buffalo Lookout), is the highest point in the Ozarks at 2,561 feet (781 m), and is located in the Boston Mountains, 6.2 miles (10.0 km) east of Boston, Madison County, Arkansas, at N35.8637°, W093.4931°. Wahzhazhe is the Osage people’s name for themselves in the Dhegiha Siouan language. Turner Ward Knob (TWK) is the second highest named peak, 2.2 miles (3.5 km) east of Wahzhazhe Summit. Its elevation is 2,463 feet (751 m). Nearby, four other unnamed peaks have elevations at or slightly above 2,560 feet (780 m). The other three highest peaks are located 4–5 miles (6.4–8.0 km) south-southwest of Turner Ward Knob along Arkansas Highway 16. All of these highest points are located in the westernmost part of Newton County, Arkansas.

== Rivers and streams ==
The Boston Mountains are the source of rivers and streams that flow out from the mountains in all directions. Within a 3 miles (4,800 m) radius of a point just west of the summits discussed above are located the sources of the White River, the Buffalo River, the Kings River, War Eagle Creek, and Little Mulberry Creek. Other rivers and streams having their headwaters in the Boston Mountains include the Illinois River, the Mulberry River, Lee Creek, Frog Bayou, Big Piney Creek, Illinois Bayou, and the Little Red River. To the south, the Arkansas River valley separates the Boston Mountains from the Ouachita Mountains.

In Arkansas, the Boston Mountains are found in the following counties: Boone, Carroll, Cleburne, Conway, Crawford, Franklin, Independence, Johnson, Madison, Marion, Newton, Pope, Searcy, Stone, Van Buren, and Washington.

In Oklahoma, the Boston Mountains are found in these counties: Adair, Cherokee, Muskogee, Sequoyah, and Wagoner.

== Gallery ==
=== Landscapes ===
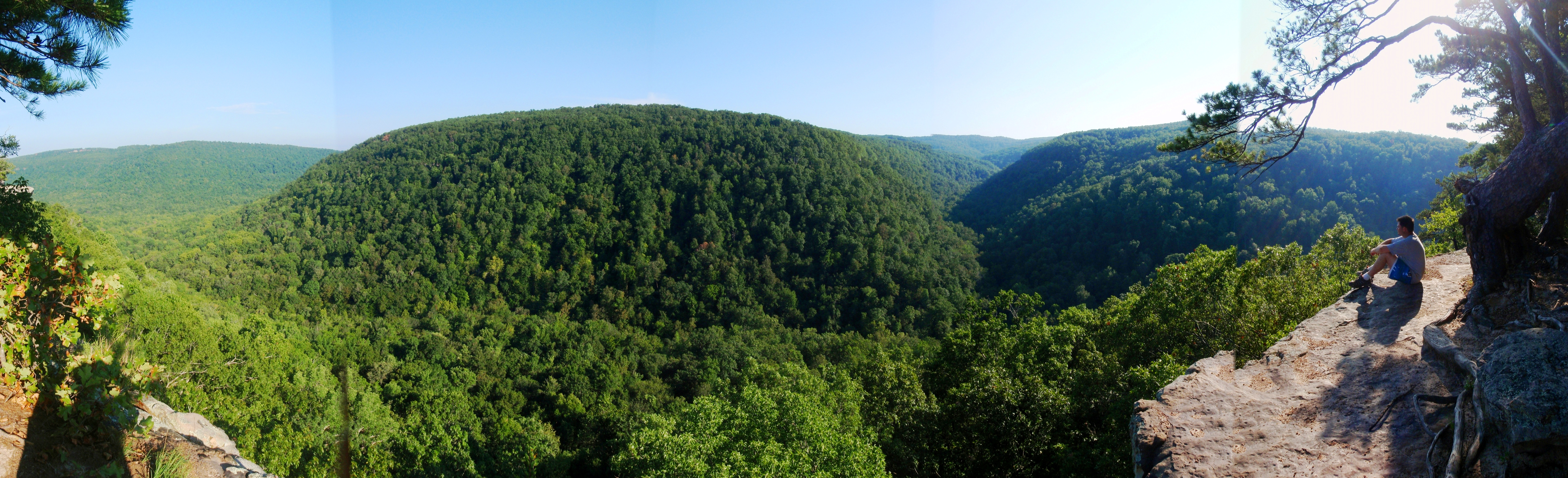
Buffalo Wilderness

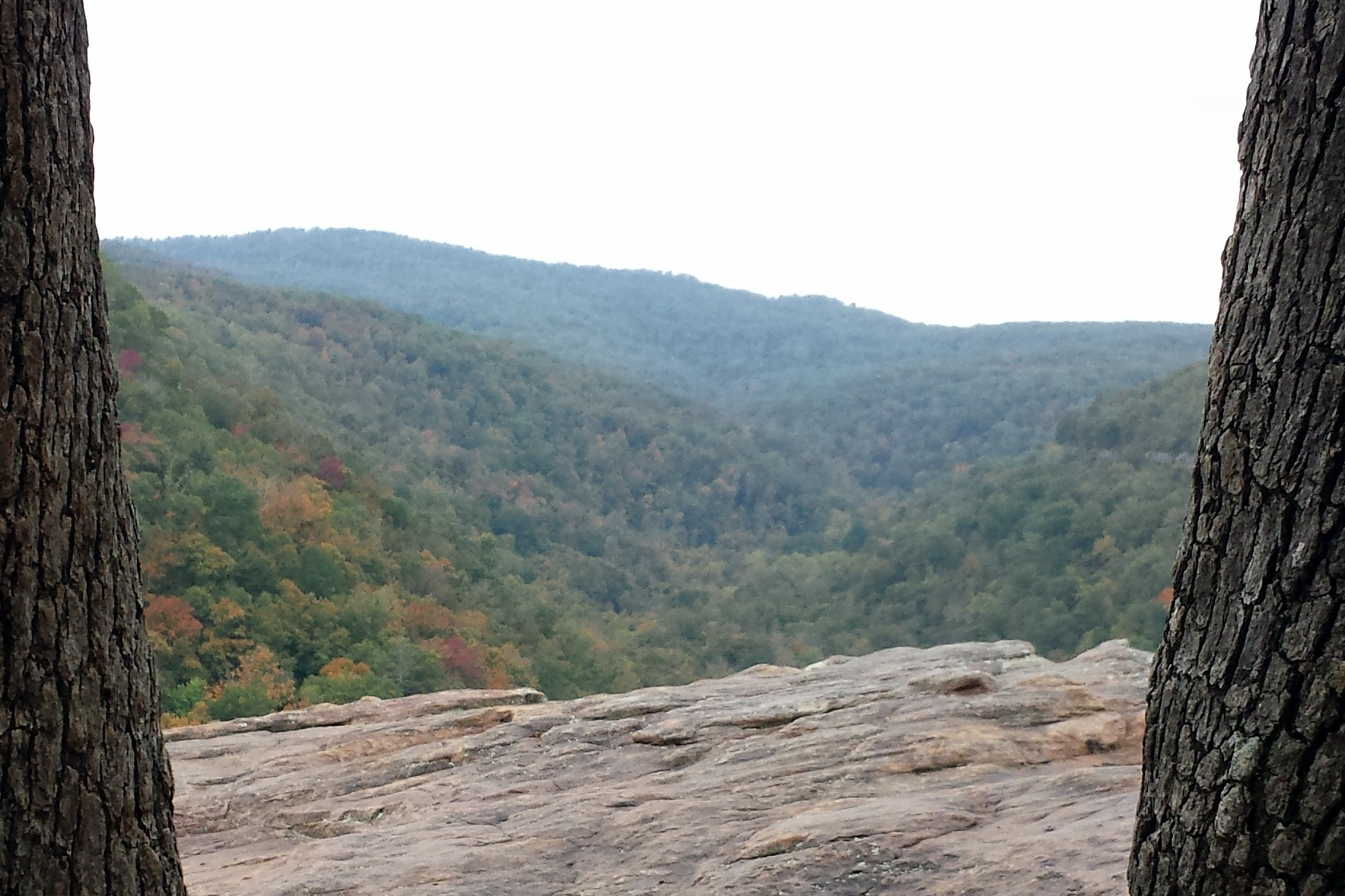
View from Hawksbill Crag

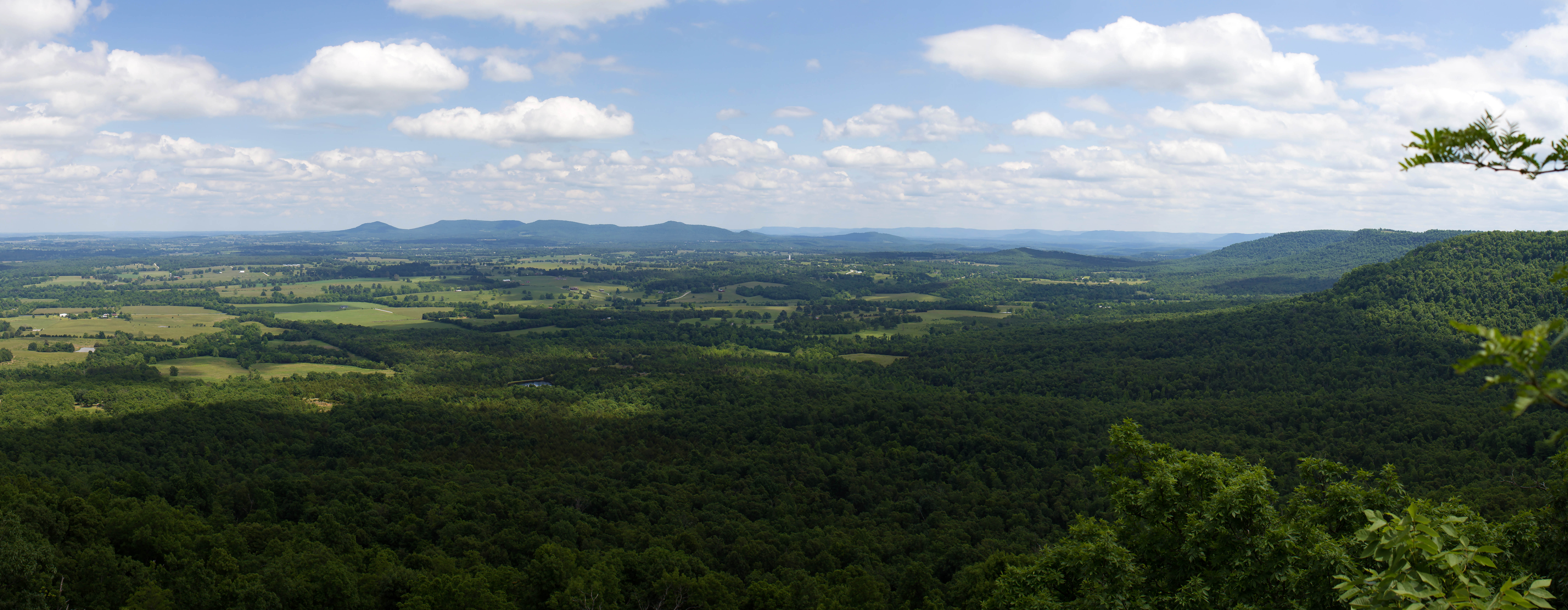
Looking east on Gaither Mountain from AR 43. The plateau of the Boston Mountains is clearly visible on the right.

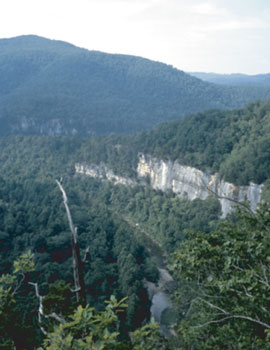
Buffalo River from river trail overlook near Steel Creek in the Boston Mountains

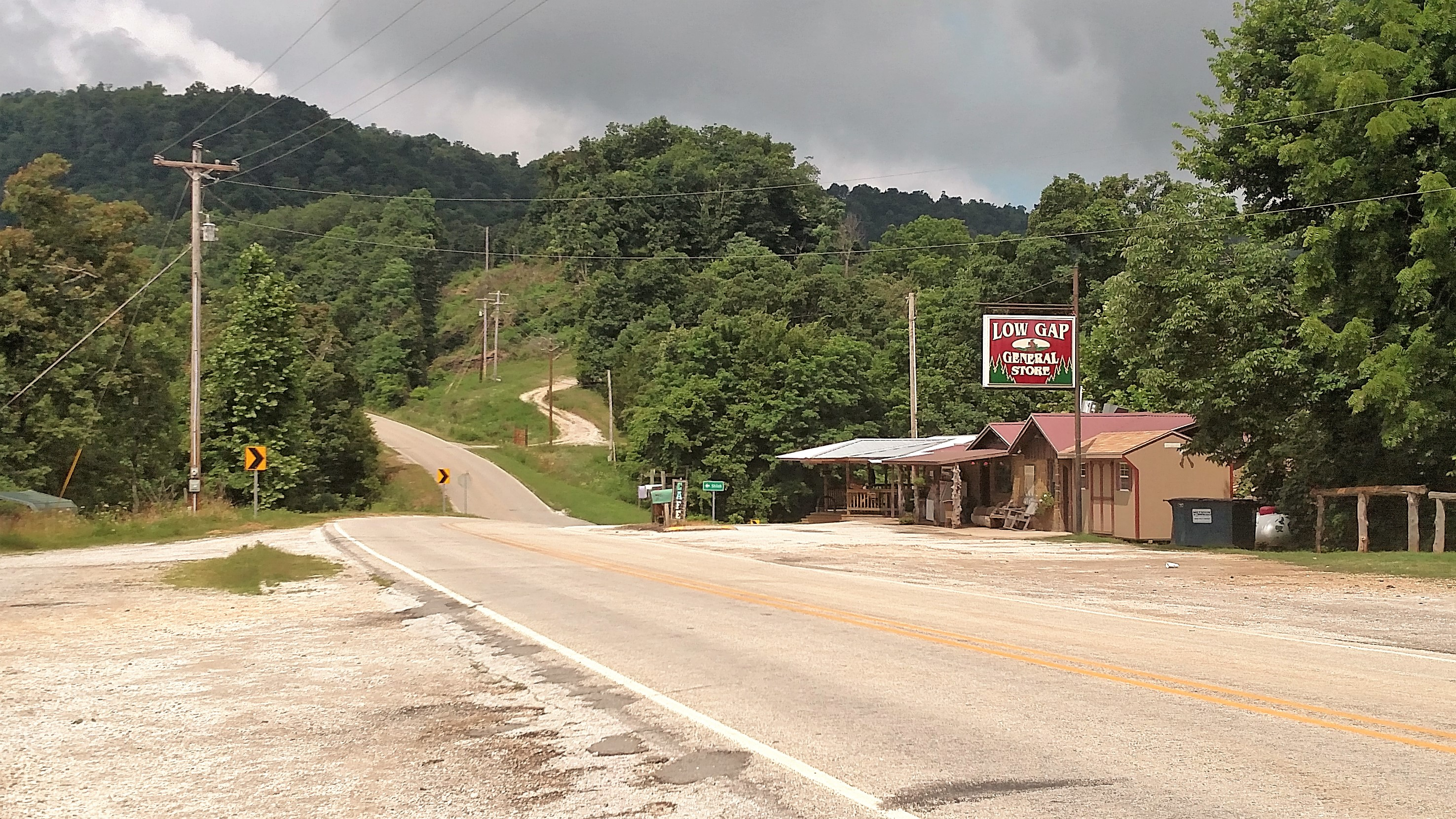
Low Gap community in the Boston Mountains

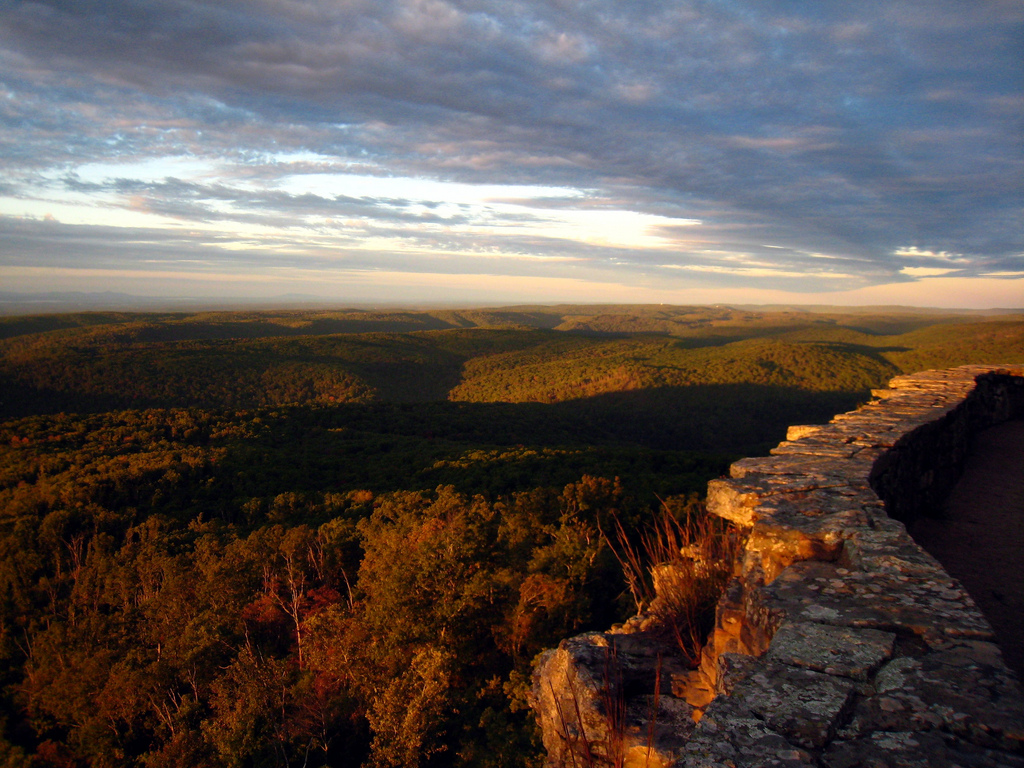
White Rock Mountain

== See also ==
- Cookson Hills
- Sam's Throne
- Ecoregions defined by the EPA and the Commission for Environmental Cooperation:
  - List of ecoregions in North America (CEC)
  - List of ecoregions in the United States (EPA)
  - List of ecoregions in Arkansas
  - List of ecoregions in Oklahoma
- The conservation group World Wildlife Fund maintains an alternate classification system:
  - List of ecoregions (WWF)
  - List of ecoregions in the United States (WWF)
