= Salem Plateau =

Salem Plateau may refer to:

- The geologically defined portion of the Ozarks
- The biologically defined subregion of the Ozark Highlands (ecoregion)
