= Arkansas Valley (ecoregion) =

EPA Level III ecoregion

Arkansas Valley ecoregion
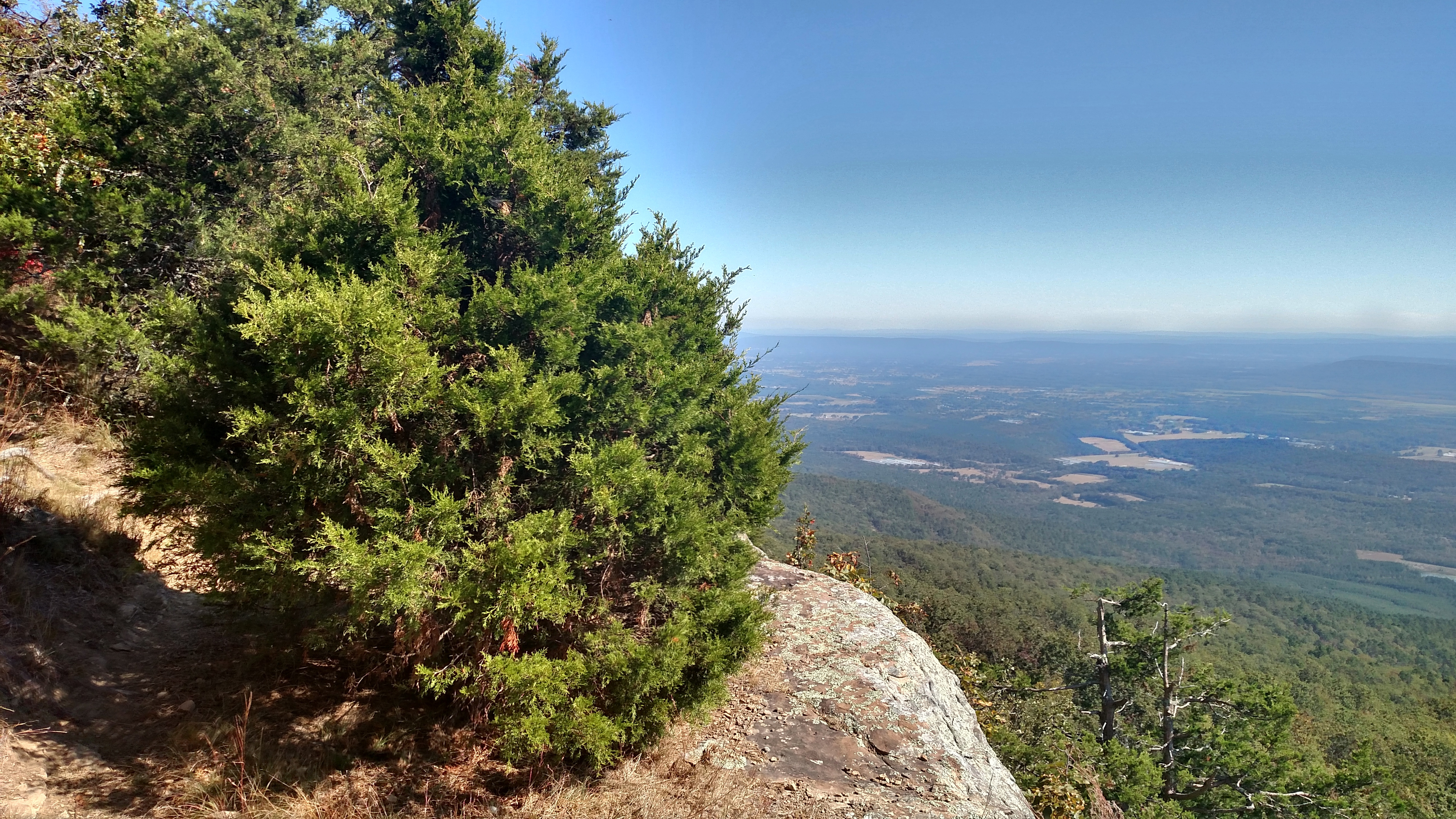
- View from Mount Magazine, the highest point in Arkansas, looking down upon the low valleys and hills of the Arkansas Valley

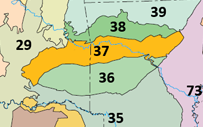
- Level III ecoregions in the region, with the Arkansas Valley ecoregion marked as (37) (full map)

Ecology
- Borders: List: Boston Mountains (38); Mississippi Alluvial Plain (73); South Central Plains (35); Ouachita Mountains (36); Central Oklahoma/Texas Plains (29); Central Irregular Plains (40)

Geography
- Area: 28,422 km^{2} (10,974 mi^{2})
- Country: United States
- States: Arkansas; Oklahoma
- Climate type: Humid subtropical (Cfa)

The Arkansas Valley is a Level III ecoregion designated by the Environmental Protection Agency (EPA) in the U.S. states of Arkansas and Oklahoma. It parallels the Arkansas River between the flat plains of western Oklahoma and the Arkansas Delta, dividing the Ozarks and the Ouachita Mountains with the broad valleys created by the river's floodplain, occasionally interrupted by low hills, scattered ridges, and mountains. In Arkansas, the region is often known as the Arkansas River Valley (or just River Valley), especially when describing the history and culture of the region.

Arkansas Valley is a synclinal and alluvial valley lying between the Ozark Highlands and the Ouachita Mountains. The Arkansas Valley is, characteristically, diverse and transitional. It generally coincides with the Arkoma Basin, an oil and gas province, that developed as sand and mud were deposited in a depression north of the rising Ouachita Mountains during the Mississippian and Pennsylvanian eras. The Arkansas Valley contains plains, hills, floodplains, terraces, and scattered mountains. It is largely underlain by interbedded Pennsylvanian sandstone, shale, and siltstone. Prior to the 19th century, uplands were dominated by a mix of forest, woodland, savanna, and prairie whereas floodplains and lower terraces were covered by bottomland deciduous forest. Today, less rugged upland areas have been cleared for pastureland or hayland. Poultry and livestock farming are important land uses. Water quality is generally good and influenced more by land use activities than by soils or geology; average stream gradients and dissolved oxygen levels are lower in the Arkansas Valley than in the Ouachita Mountains or Ozark Highlands, whereas turbidity, total suspended solids, total organic carbon, total phosphorus, and biochemical oxygen demand values are typically higher. The Arkansas River is continuously turbid. Summer flow in smaller streams is typically limited or nonexistent. Fish communities characteristically contain a substantial proportion of sensitive species; a sunfish- and minnowdominated community exists along with substantial proportions of darters and catfishes (particularly madtoms).

The Arkansas Valley ecoregion has been subdivided into five Level IV ecoregions.

== Level IV ecoregions ==
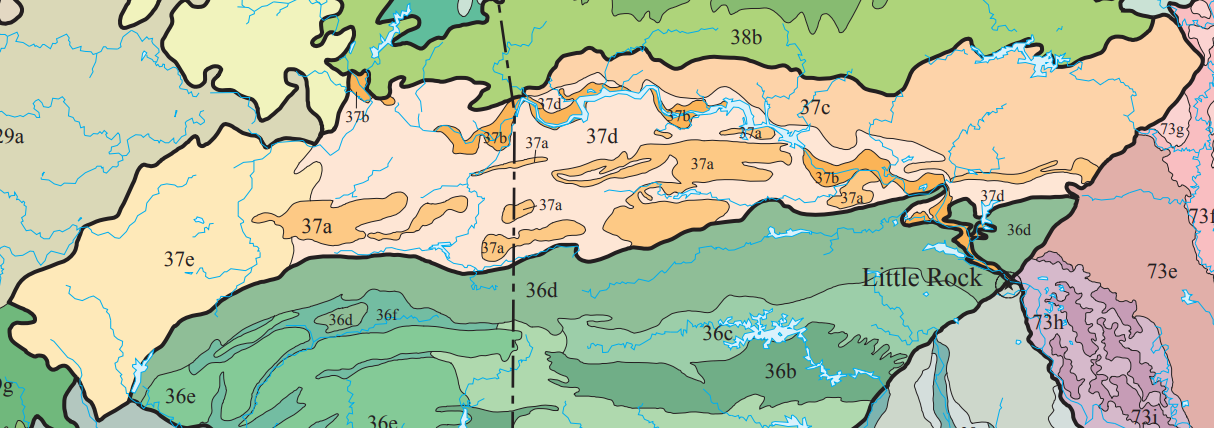
Level IV ecoregions in the Arkansas Valley in Arkansas and Oklahoma.

=== Scattered High Ridges and Mountains (37a) ===
The Scattered High Ridges and Mountains ecoregion is the most rugged and wooded in the Arkansas Valley. The ecoregion is characteristically covered by savannas, open woodlands, or forests dominated or codominated by upland oaks, hickory, and shortleaf pine; loblolly pine occurs but is not native. It is underlain by Pennsylvanian sandstone and shale; calcareous rocks such as those that dominate the Ozark Highlands are absent. Nutrient and mineral values (including turbidity and hardness) in streams are slightly higher than in other parts of the Arkansas Valley. Magazine Mountain, the highest point in Arkansas at 2,753 feet, is distinguished by diverse habitats. Its flat top is covered with xeric, stunted woodlands. Mesic habitats also occur and may contain beech–maple forests. The region covers 895 square miles (2,320 km^{2}) in Arkansas and 383 square miles (990 km^{2}) in Oklahoma. Public lands include the Poteau Mountain Wilderness and the Dry Creek Wilderness, bordering the Fourche Mountains in the Ouachita National Forest. Mount Magazine State Park, Mount Nebo State Park, and Petit Jean State Park represent protected mountains scattered through the gentler plains and floodplains of the Arkansas Valley.

=== Arkansas River Floodplain (37b) ===
The Arkansas River Floodplain ecoregion is characteristically veneered with Holocene alluvium and includes natural levees, meander scars, oxbow lakes, point bars, swales, and backswamps. It is lithologically and physiographically distinct from the surrounding uplands of the Arkansas Valley. Mollisols, Entisols, Alfisols, and Inceptisols are common; the soil mosaic sharply contrasts with nearby, higher elevation ecoregions where Ultisols developed under upland oaks, hickory, and pine. Potential natural vegetation is southern floodplain forest. Bottomland oaks including bur oak, American sycamore, sweetgum, willows, eastern cottonwood, green ash, pecan, hackberry, and elm were once extensive. They have been widely cleared for pastureland, hayland, and cropland. However, some forest remains in frequently flooded or poorly-drained areas. In Arkansas, bur oak is most dominant in ecoregion 37b. The region covers 415 square miles (1,070 km^{2}) in Arkansas and 135 square miles (350 km^{2}) in Oklahoma.

A large section of preserved ecoregion is within Holla Bend National Wildlife Refuge and Galla Creek Wildlife Management Area in southern Pope County, Arkansas. Near Central Arkansas, Bell Slough Wildlife Management Area, a 2,040 acres (830 ha) outcropping of Arkansas River Floodplain wedged between a mountainous section. Bell Slough WMA is home to the moist-soil wetlands, bottomland hardwood forest, and prairie attractive to migratory waterfowl along the Mississippi Flyway, as well as upland hardwood and pine forest in a transition zone toward the upland mountains.

=== Arkansas Valley Hills (37c) ===
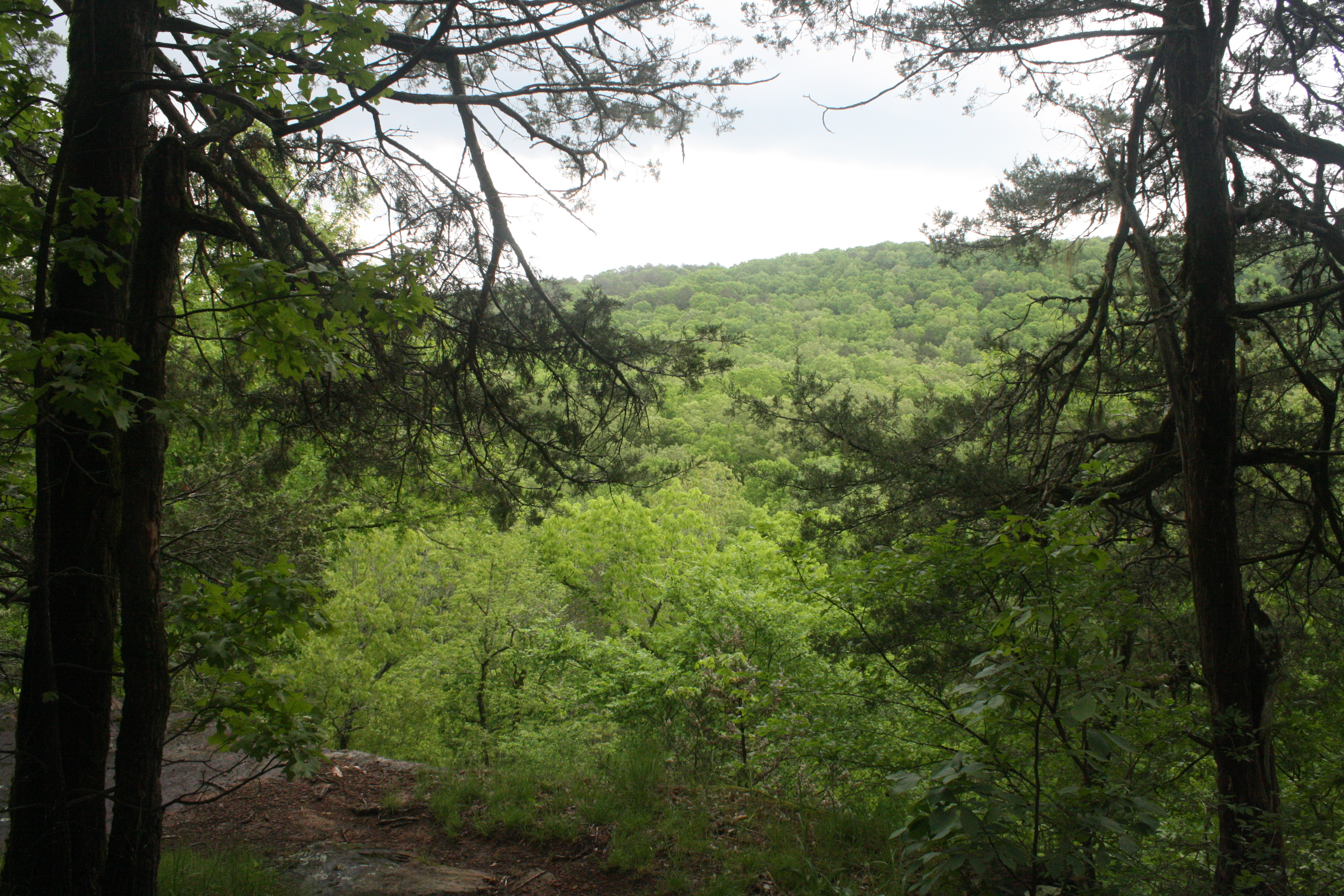
Big Creek Valley along the Overlook Trail in the Big Creek Natural Area, Cleburne County, Arkansas

The Arkansas Valley Hills ecoregion is underlain by Pennsylvanian sandstone and shale, and is lithologically distinct from Ecoregions 37b and 39. Ecoregion 37c is hillier than the Arkansas Valley Plains (37d) and less rugged than Ecoregions 36, 37a, and 38. Ultisols are common and support a potential natural vegetation of oak–hickory forest or oak–hickory–pine forest; both soils and natural vegetation contrast with those of Ecoregion 37b. Today, pastureland is extensive, but rugged areas are wooded; overall, trees are much less extensive than in neighboring Ecoregions 36d, 37a, and 38 but more widespread than in Ecoregions 37b and 37d. Poultry operations, livestock farming, and logging are important land uses. The region covers 2,771 square miles (7,180 km^{2}), entirely within Arkansas. Preserved examples of the ecoregion include Cove Creek Natural Area and Woolly Hollow State Park in Faulkner County and Big Creek Natural Area in Cleburne County.

=== Arkansas Valley Plains (37d) ===
The Arkansas Valley Plains ecoregion is in the rainshadow of the Fourche Mountains and was once covered by a distinctive mosaic of prairie, savanna, and woodland. Ecoregion 37d is mostly undulating but a few hills and ridges occur. Westward, Ecoregion 37d becomes flatter, drier, more open, and has fewer topographic fire barriers. Prior to the 19th century, frequently burned western areas had extensive prairie on droughty soils; scattered pine–oak savanna also occurred. Elsewhere, potential natural vegetation is primarily oak–hickory forest or oak–hickory–pine forest. Today, pastureland and hayland are extensive but remnants of prairie, particularly the Cherokee Prairie near Fort Smith, and woodland occur. Poultry and livestock farming are primary land uses. Cropland agriculture in the Arkansas Valley Plains is less important than in Ecoregion 37b, and wooded areas are not as extensive as in more rugged Ecoregions 36, 37a, 37c, and 38. Stream turbidity generally remains low except during storm events. The region covers 2,084 square miles (5,400 km^{2}) in Arkansas and 1,655 square miles (4,290 km^{2}) in Oklahoma.

Small remnants of this ecoregion are preserved in Arkansas, including Cherokee Prairie Natural Area and H.E. Flanagan Natural Area in southern Franklin County, Arkansas, and Petit Jean River Wildlife Management Area and Ed Gordon Point Remove Wildlife Management Area.

=== Lower Canadian Hills (37e) ===
The Lower Canadian Hills ecoregion is underlain by Pennsylvanian-age shale, sandstone, and coal. It acts as a transition between the drier Cross Timbers to the west and moister parts of the Arkansas Valley to the east. Native vegetation is a mixture of oak woodland, tallgrass prairie, oak–hickory forest, and oak–hickory–pine forest. In general, wooded hills are more widespread than in the nearby Arkansas Valley Plains and Osage Cuestas. Prairies become more extensive in ecoregions to the west. Streams tend to have deeper pools and more habitat diversity than in the Northern Cross Timbers. Fish and macroinvertebrate species richness is greater than in the Cross Timbers, but less than in the rest of the Arkansas Valley. The ecoregion covers 2,635 square miles (6,820 km^{2}), entirely within Oklahoma.

== Gallery ==
=== Landscapes ===
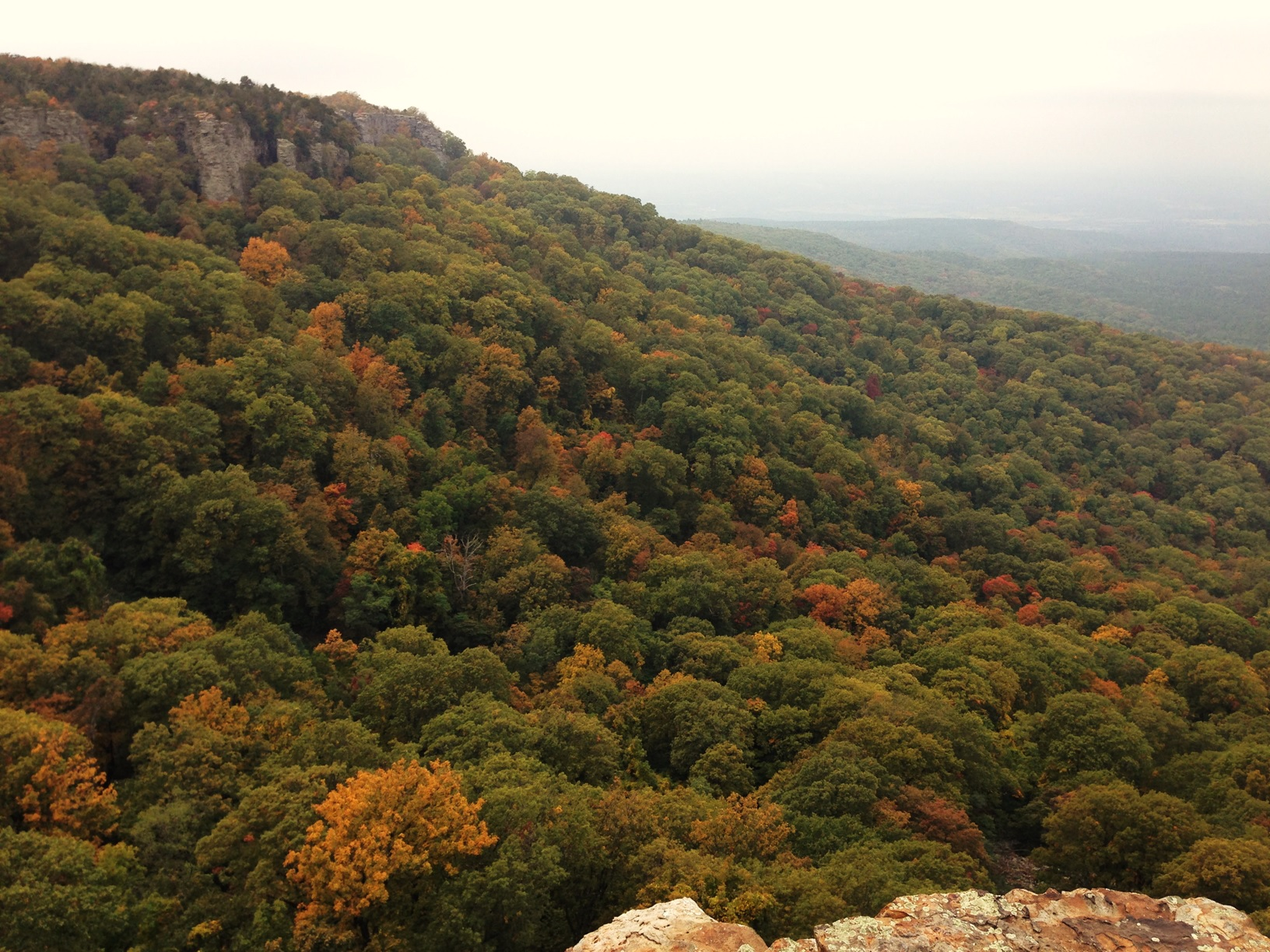
Mount Magazine within Ecoregion 37a

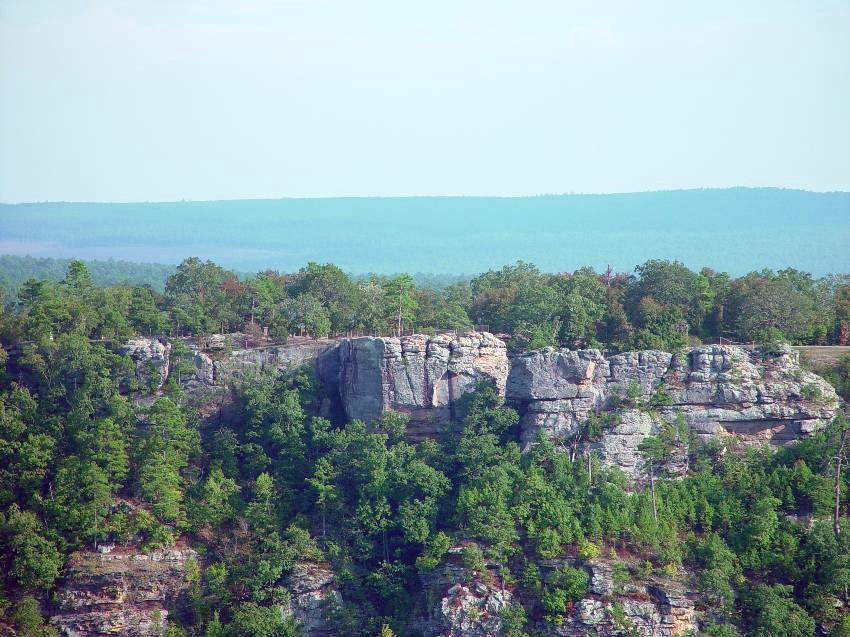
Bluffs at Petit Jean State Park within Ecoregion 37a

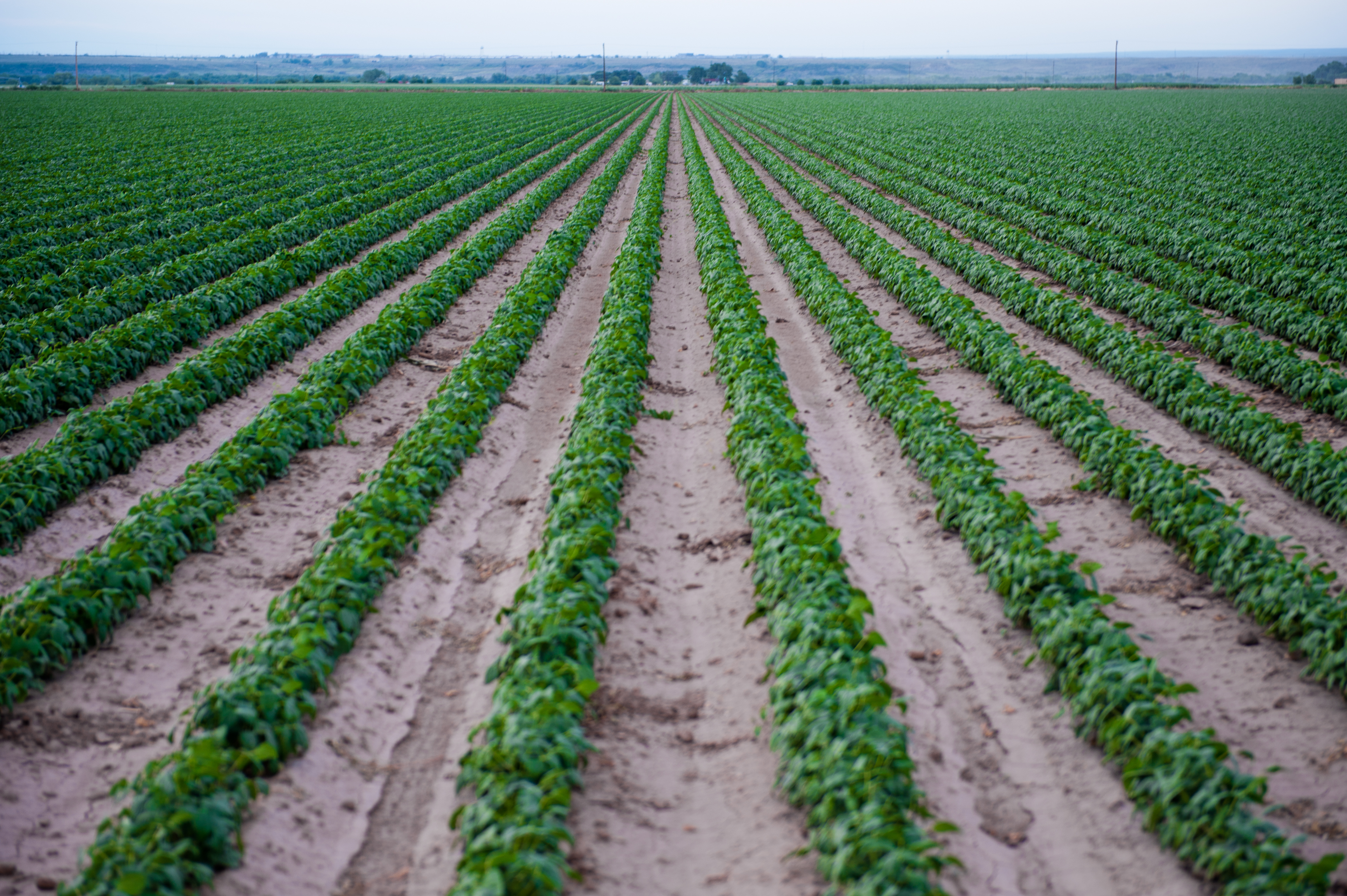
Row agriculture typical of Ecoregion 37b

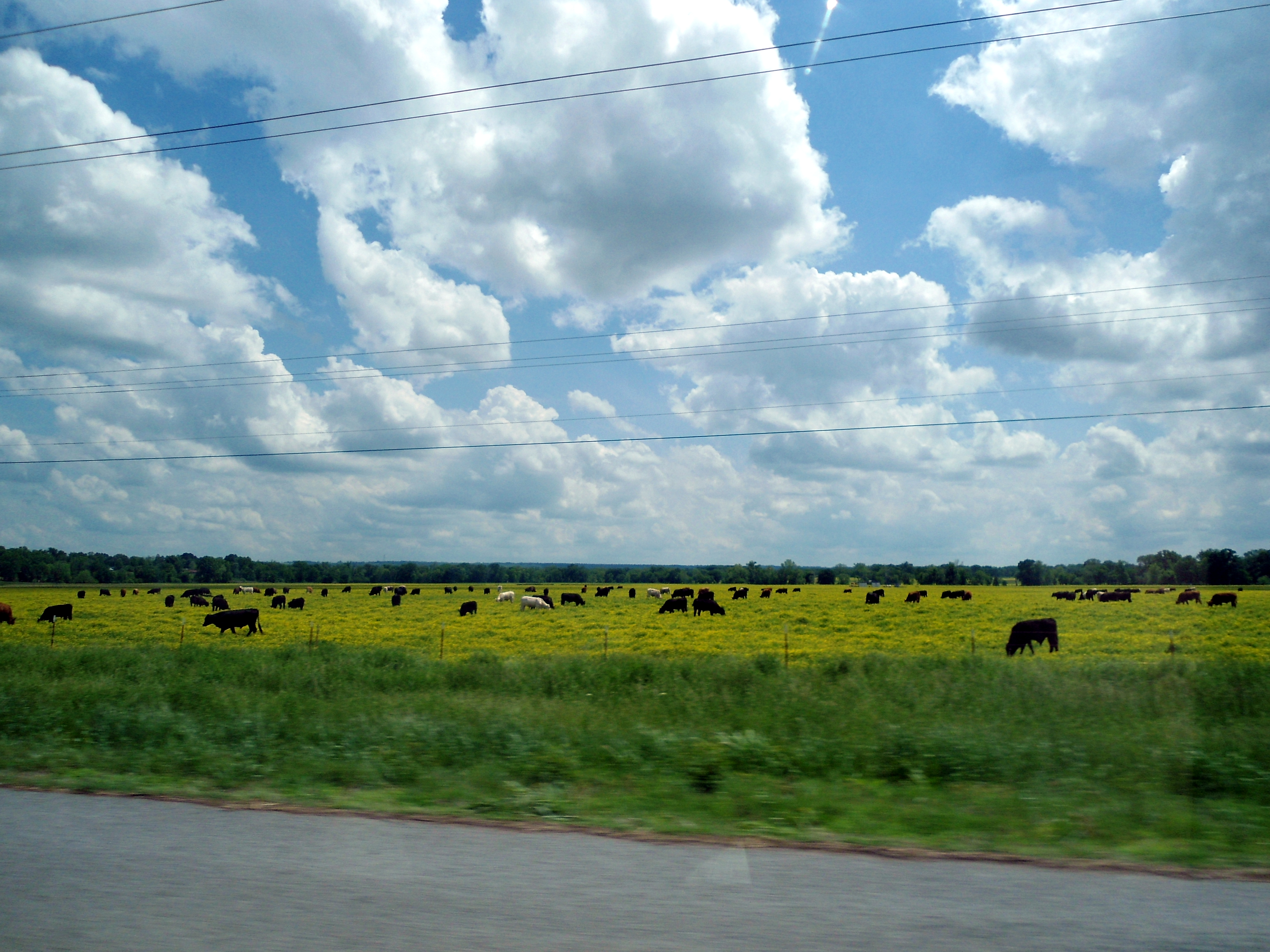
Grazing cattle in Ecoregion 37c

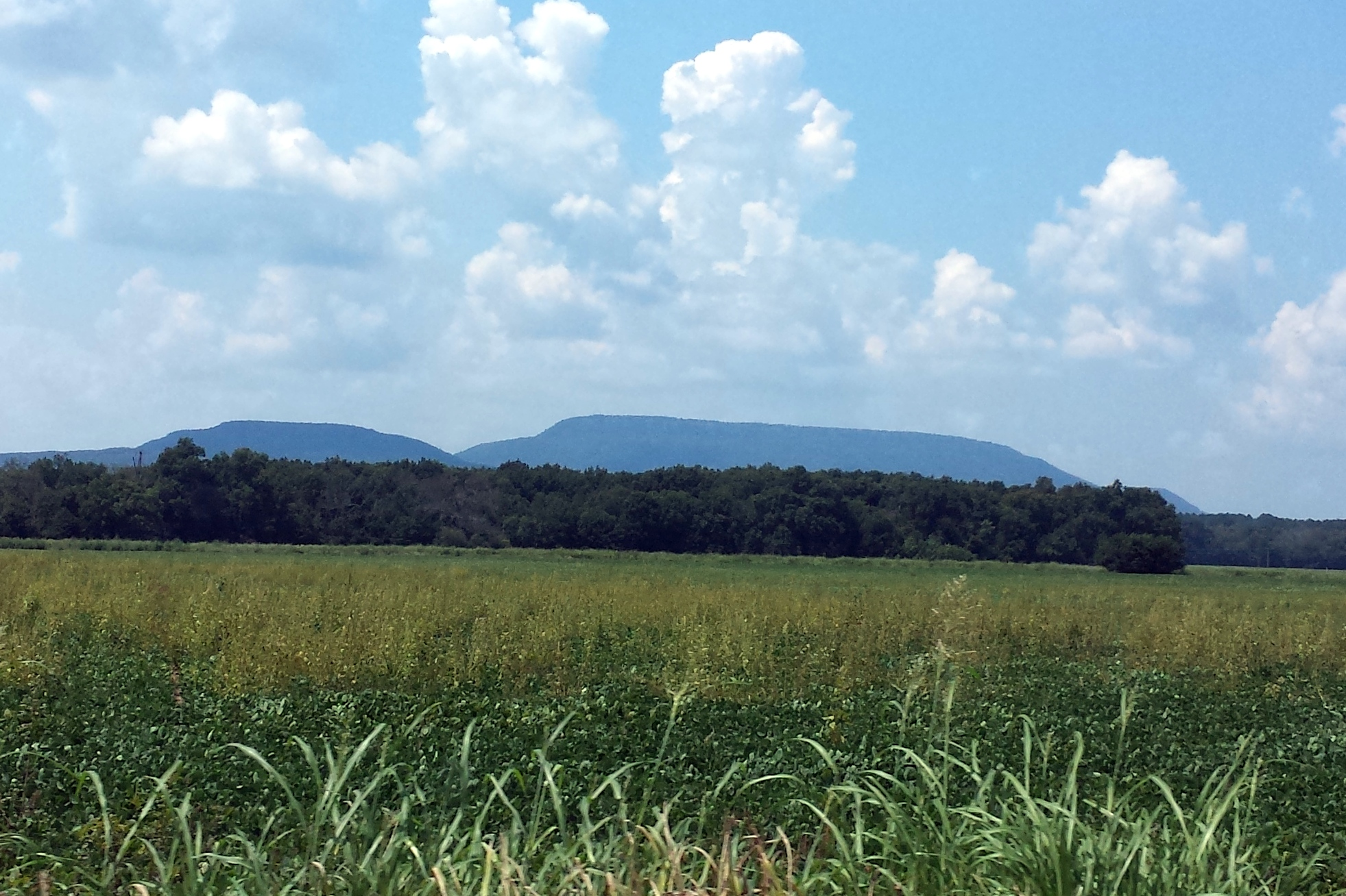
Mount Nebo rises from the plains of Ecoregion 37d

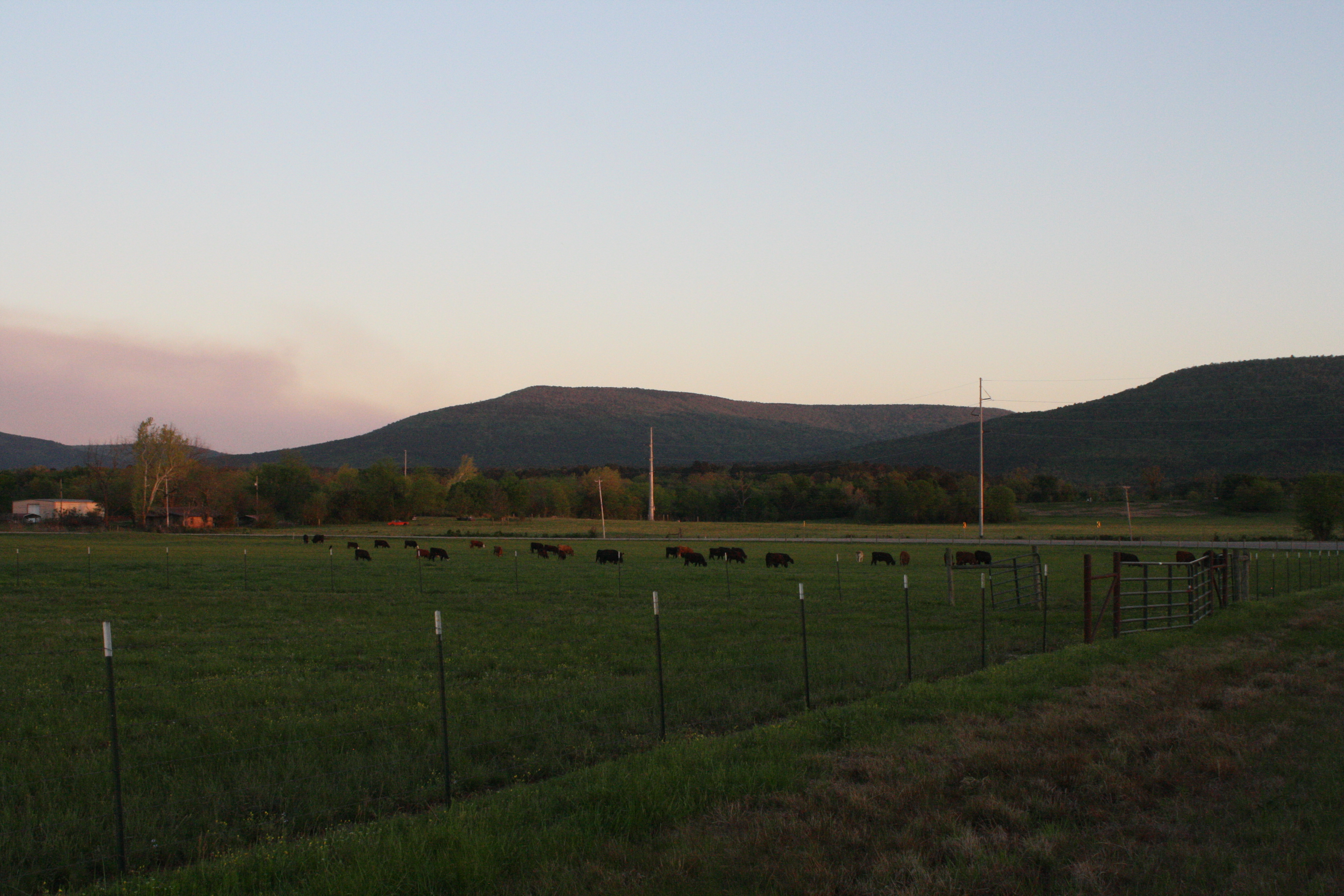
Cattle grazing the plains of Ecoregion 37d south of Mansfield, Arkansas

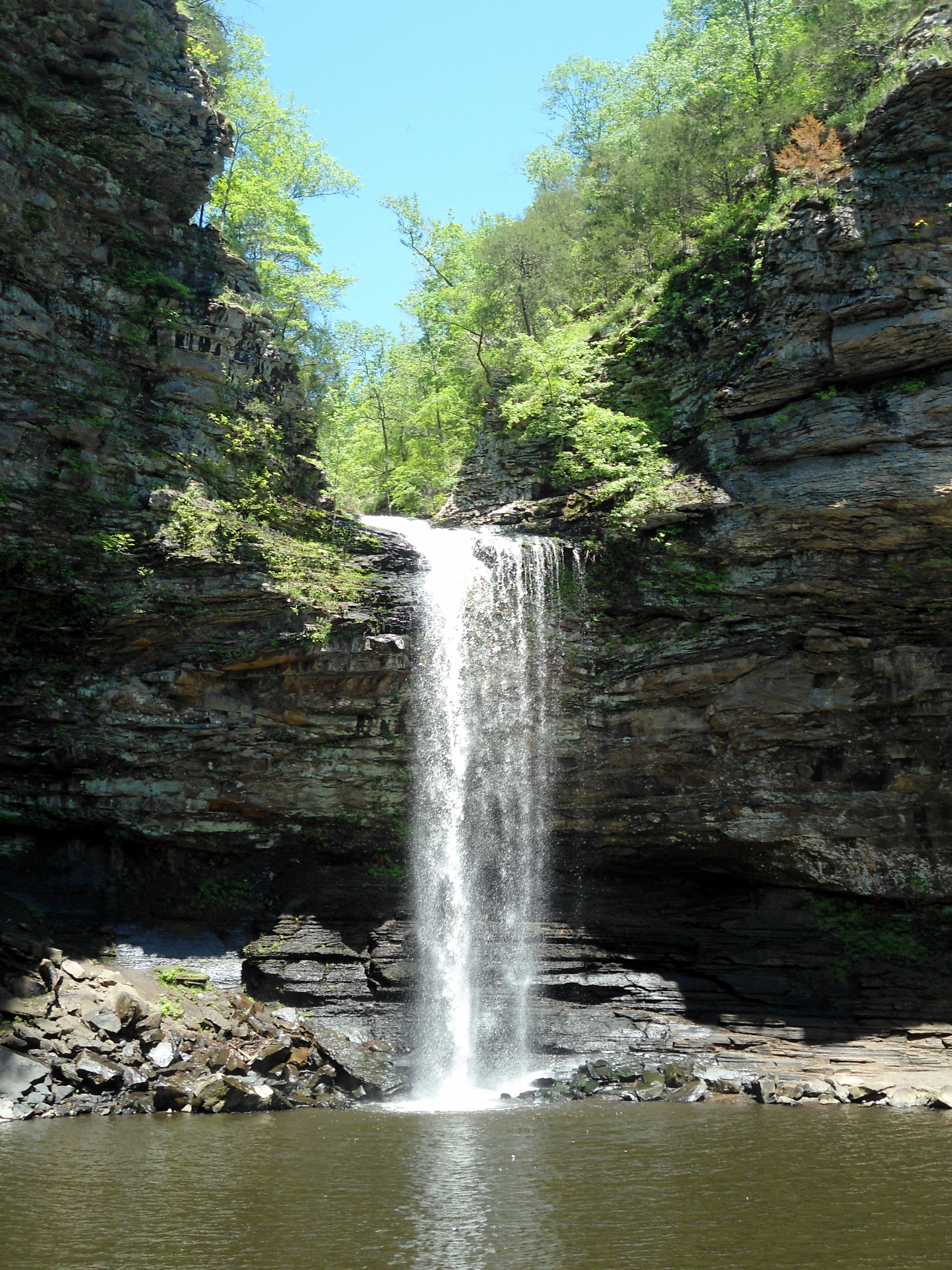
Cedar Falls

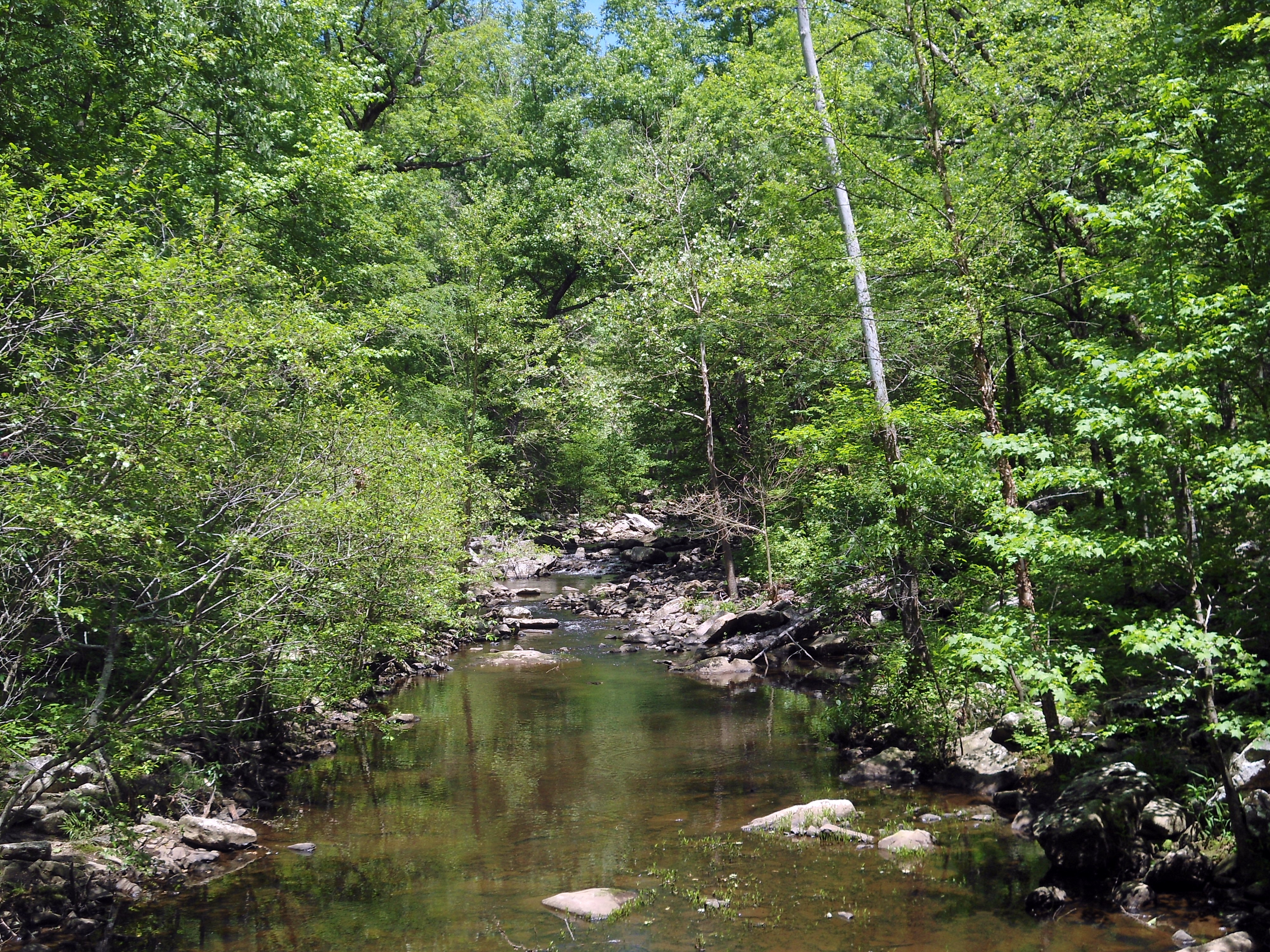
Low gradient Cedar River

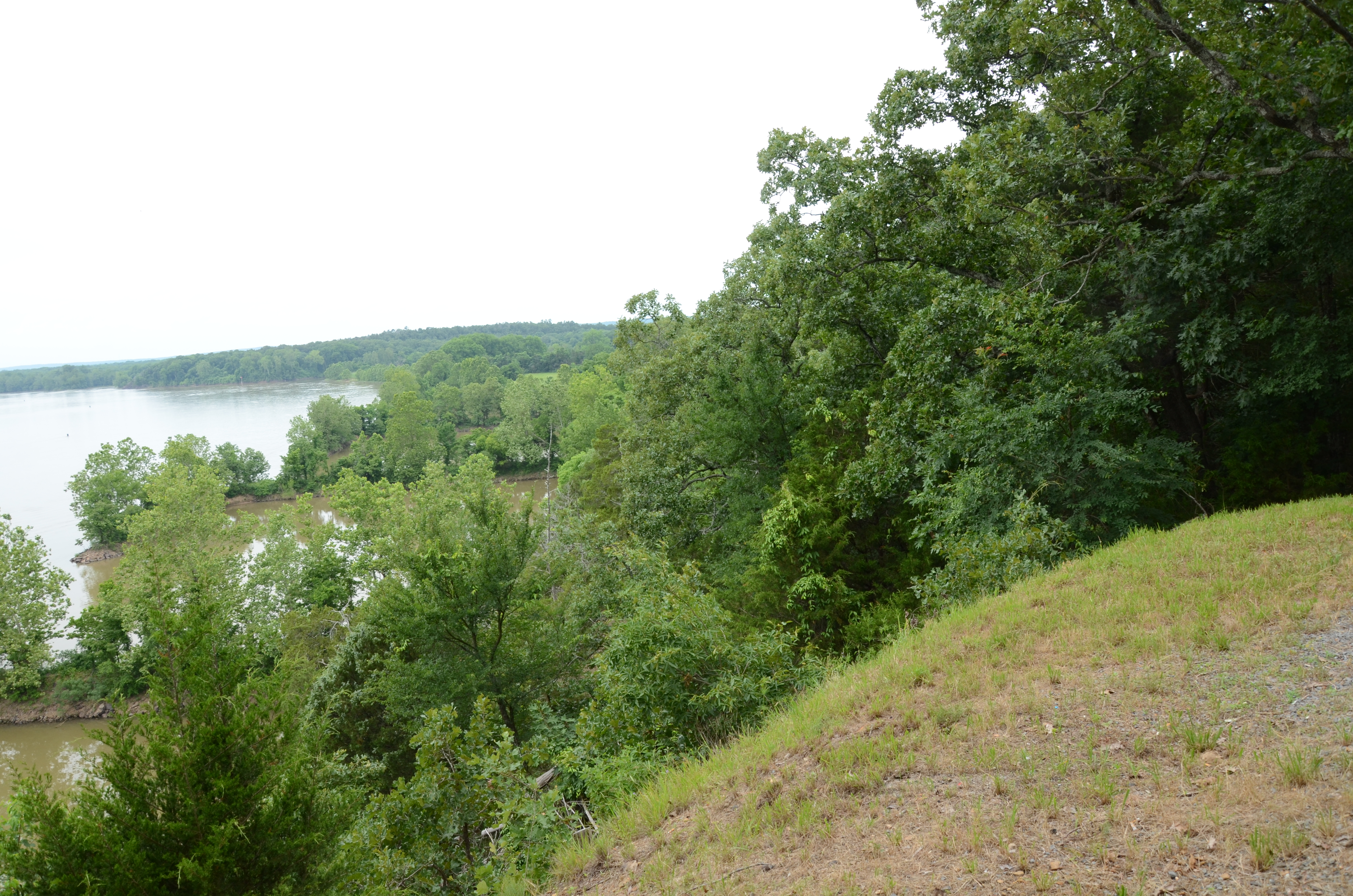
Overlooking the Arkansas River at Cadron Settlement Park

== See also ==
- Arkansas River Valley
- Ecoregions defined by the EPA and the Commission for Environmental Cooperation:
  - List of ecoregions in North America (CEC)
  - List of ecoregions in the United States (EPA)
  - List of ecoregions in Arkansas
  - List of ecoregions in Oklahoma
- The conservation group World Wildlife Fund maintains an alternate classification system:
  - List of ecoregions (WWF)
  - List of ecoregions in the United States (WWF)
