= Sam's Throne =

Rock climbing attraction

Coordinates: 35°52′15″N 93°03′31″W

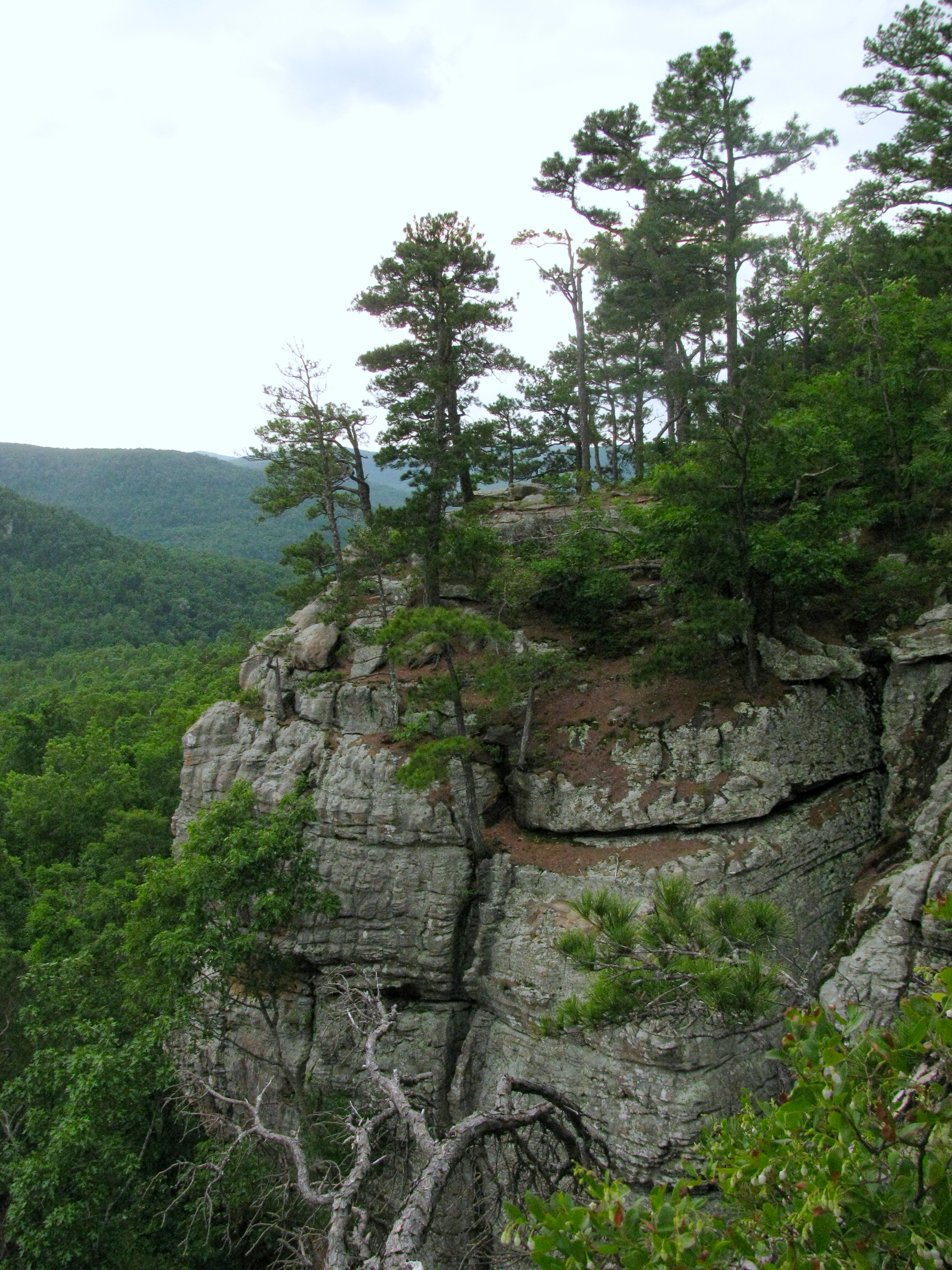
- Sam's Throne, May 2011
- Interactive map of Sam's Throne
- Location: Ozark – St. Francis National Forest, Arkansas, USA
- Nearest city: Jasper, Arkansas
- Range: Boston Mountains, Ozarks
- Rock type: Sandstone
- Website: Official website

Sam's Throne is a hard sandstone rock climbing area in the Boston Mountains of north central Arkansas, in the Ozark - St. Francis National Forest. Among its attractions for serious rock climbers is the Chickenhead Wall formation.

The area is extensively described in the guide Arkansas Rock Volume 1 by Clay Frisbie (Boston Mountain Press).

The surrounding area contains over 100 named climbing routes of various difficulty, and is serviced by a paved Forest Service Road from the town of Mount Judea.
