= Keels Creek =

Stream in Carroll County, Arkansas, U.S.

Keels Creek is a stream in Carroll County in the U.S. state of Arkansas. It is a tributary to the Kings River.

The stream headwaters arise at 36°19′55″N 93°44′12″W and the confluence with the Kings River is at 36°22′12″N 93°39′34″W.

Keels Creek has the name of Keel Williams, an early settler.
