= Compton, Arkansas =

- Unincorporated community
- Former general store in Compton

- Location within Arkansas Location within the United States
- Coordinates: 36°05′48″N 93°18′10″W
- Country: United States
- State: Arkansas
- County: Newton
- Elevation: 2,165 ft (660 m)
- Time zone: UTC-6 (Central (CST))
  - Summer (DST): UTC-5 (CDT)
- ZIP code: 72624
- Area code: 870

Compton is an unincorporated community in Newton County, Arkansas, United States. Compton is located on Arkansas Highway 43, 14 miles (23 km) southwest of Harrison. Osage Creek flows past the west side of the community.

Former Compton School

Compton has a post office with ZIP code 72624.
