= Rule, Arkansas =

Unincorporated community in Arkansas, US

Coordinates: 36°16′40″N 93°27′36″W

Rule is an unincorporated community in Carroll County, Arkansas, United States. The community is located on Arkansas Highway 103 on the banks of Osage Creek and about four miles south of Green Forest.
