= List of ecoregions in Arkansas =

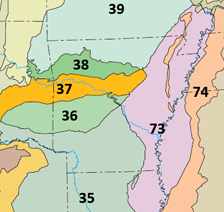
The level III ecoregions in Arkansas are the South Central Plains (35), Ouachita Mountains (36), Arkansas Valley (37), Boston Mountains (38), Ozark Highlands (39), Mississippi Alluvial Plain (73), Mississippi Valley Loess Plains (74). (Compare to map of Level IV ecoregions.)

This list of ecoregions in Arkansas provides an overview of ecoregions in the U.S. state of Arkansas designated by the U.S. Environmental Protection Agency (EPA) and the Commission for Environmental Cooperation (CEC). The commission's 1997 report, Ecological Regions of North America, provides a spatial framework that may be used by government agencies, non-governmental organizations, and academic researchers as a basis for risk analysis, resource management, and environmental study of the continent's ecosystems. Ecoregions may be identified by similarities in geology, physiography, vegetation, climate, soils, land use, wildlife distributions, and hydrology.

The classification system has four levels. Levels III, and IV are shown on this list. Level I divides North America into 15 ecoregions; of these, the entire state is within the Eastern Temperate Forests level. Subdividing the Eastern Temperate Forests, Arkansas is split among three Level II ecoregions: the Southeastern Plains, Ozark, Ouachita, Appalachian Forests, and the Mississippi Alluvial and Southeast USA Coastal Plains. Level III subdivides the continent into 182 ecoregions; of these, seven lay partly within Arkansas's borders. Level IV is a further subdivision of Level III ecoregions. There are 32 Level IV ecoregions in Arkansas, many of which continue into adjacent areas in the neighboring states of Oklahoma, Mississippi, Missouri, Louisiana, Tennessee, and Texas.

The task of defining and mapping these ecoregions was carried out by the United States Environmental Protection Agency (EPA) Region 6, EPA-National Health and Environmental Effects Research Laboratory (Corvallis, Oregon), and the Multi-Agency Wetland Planning Team. (Note: Multi-Agency Wetland Planning Team consists of the Arkansas Natural Heritage Commission, Arkansas Soil and Water Conservation Commission, Arkansas Game and Fish Commission (AGFC), Arkansas Department of Environmental Quality (ADEQ), Arkansas Forestry Commission, and University of Arkansas Cooperative Extension Service.) The new classification system they developed may differ from previous frameworks developed separately by the agencies.

Arkansas is ecologically diverse. Though often simplistically split into halves from southwest to northeast, with "uplands" in the northwest half and "lowlands" in the southeastern half, the CEC system of levels reveals the diverse forests and floodplains, prairies and plateaus, ridges and river bottoms, and loess hills and lowlands of Arkansas.

== 35 South Central Plains ==
- 35a Tertiary Uplands
- 35b Floodplains and Low Terraces
- 35c Pleistocene Fluvial Terraces
- 35d Cretaceous Dissected Uplands
- 35g Red River Bottomlands
- 35h Blackland Prairie

== 36 Ouachita Mountains ==
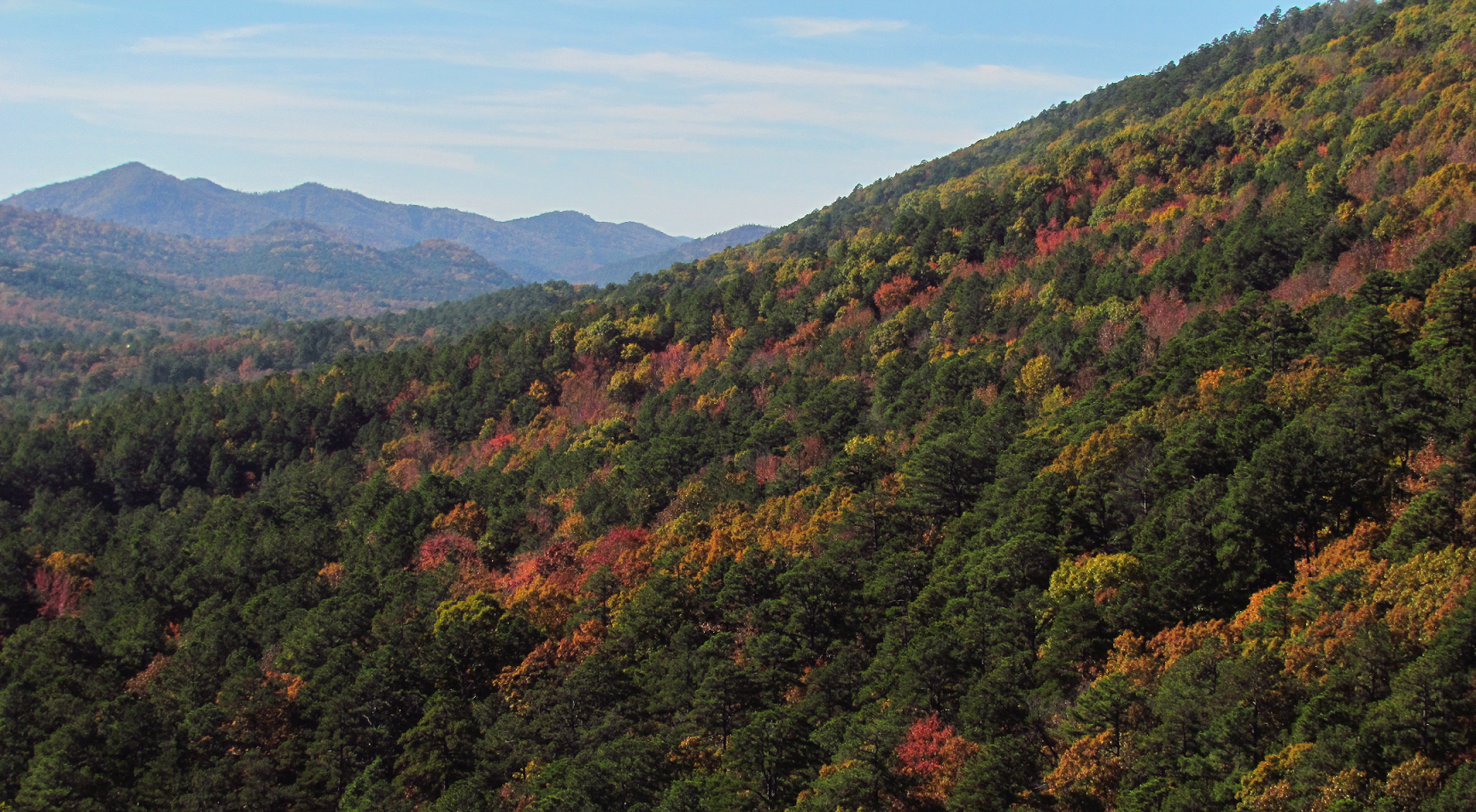
The Ouachita Mountains near Caney Creek, Arkansas

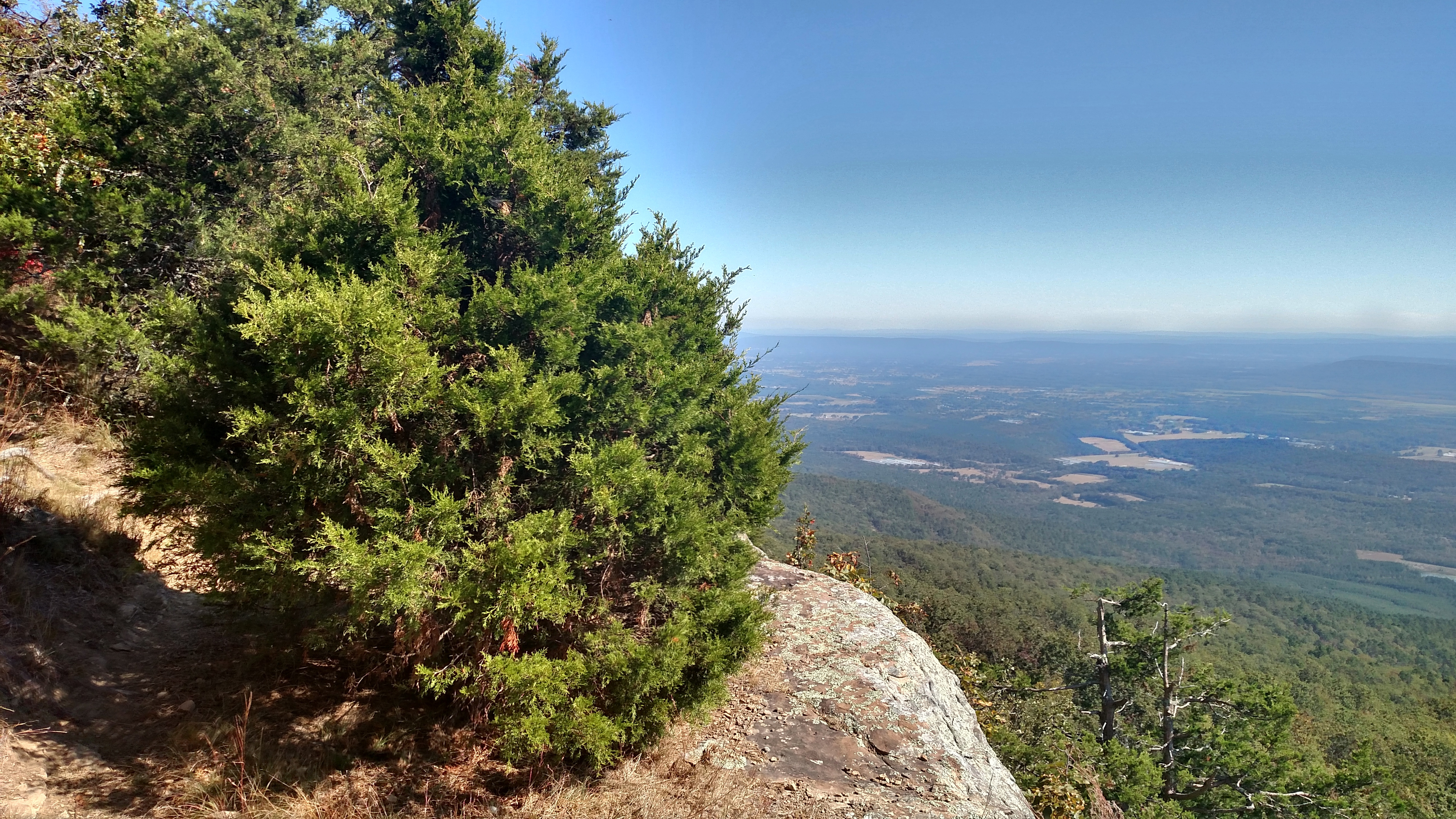
Mount Magazine, the highest point in Arkansas

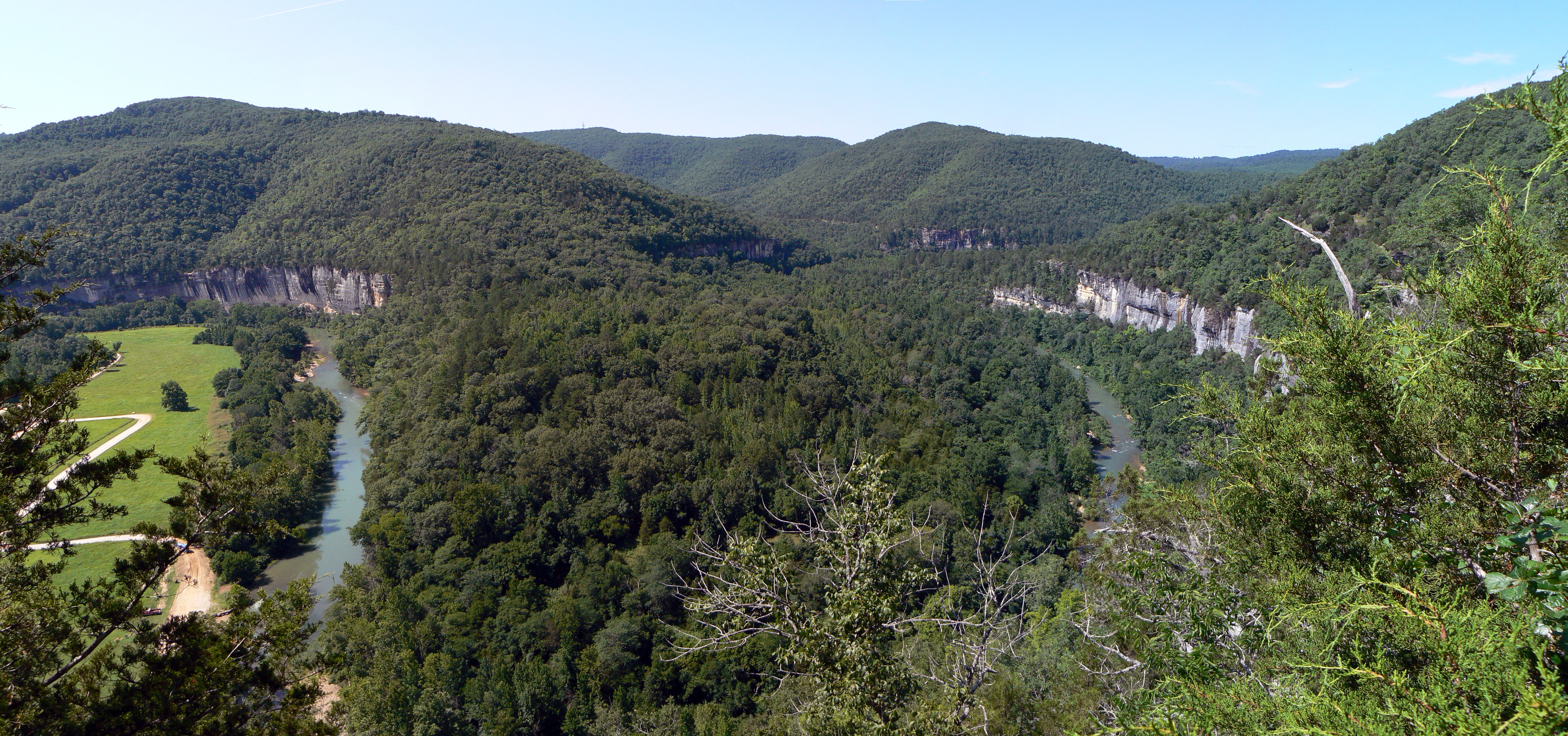
Buffalo national river steel creek overlook

- 36a Athens Plateau
- 36b Central Mountain Ranges
- 36c Central Hills, Ridges, and Valleys
- 36d Fourche Mountains
- 36e Western Ouachitas

== 37 Arkansas Valley ==
- 37a Scattered High Ridges and Mountains
- 37b Arkansas River Floodplain
- 37c Arkansas Valley Hills
- 37d Arkansas Valley Plains

== 38 Boston Mountains ==
- 38a Upper Boston Mountains
- 38b Lower Boston Mountains

== 39 Ozark Highlands ==
- 39a Springfield Plateau
- 39b Dissected Springfield Plateau–Elk River Hills
- 39c White River Hills
- 39d Central Plateau

== 73 Mississippi Alluvial Plain ==
- 73a Northern Holocene Meander Belts
- 73b Northern Pleistocene Valley Trains
- 73c St. Francis Lowlands
- 73d Northern Backswamps
- 73e Grand Prairie
- 73f Western Lowlands Holocene Meander Belts
- 73g Western Lowlands Pleistocene Valley Trains
- 73h Arkansas/Ouachita River Holocene Meander Belts
- 73i Arkansas/Ouachita River Backswamps
- 73j Macon Ridge

== 74 Mississippi Valley Loess Plains ==
- 74a Bluff Hills
