= Osage Creek (Kings River tributary) =

Stream in northern Arkansas, U.S.

Osage Creek is a stream in Newton, Boone, and Carroll counties of northern Arkansas. It is a tributary of the Kings River.

The stream headwaters arise in northern Newton County at 36°05′47″N 93°20′56″W at an elevation of 2,250 ft (690 m). The stream flows east then turns north just west of Compton roughly paralleling Arkansas Highway 43 to enter the southwest corner of Boone County.

The stream turns to the northwest and enters Carroll County. The stream flows northwest past the communities of Delmar and Osage where it crosses under Arkansas Highway 68. It then crosses Arkansas Highway 103 between Conner and Rule.

The stream crosses under Arkansas Highway 21 and Arkansas Highway 221 south of Berryville and enters the Kings River about five miles west of Berryville just south of US Route 62.

The confluence with the Kings River is at 36°23′37″N 93°38′16″W at an elevation of 997 ft (304 m).
