= Arkoma Basin =

Geological feature in the United States

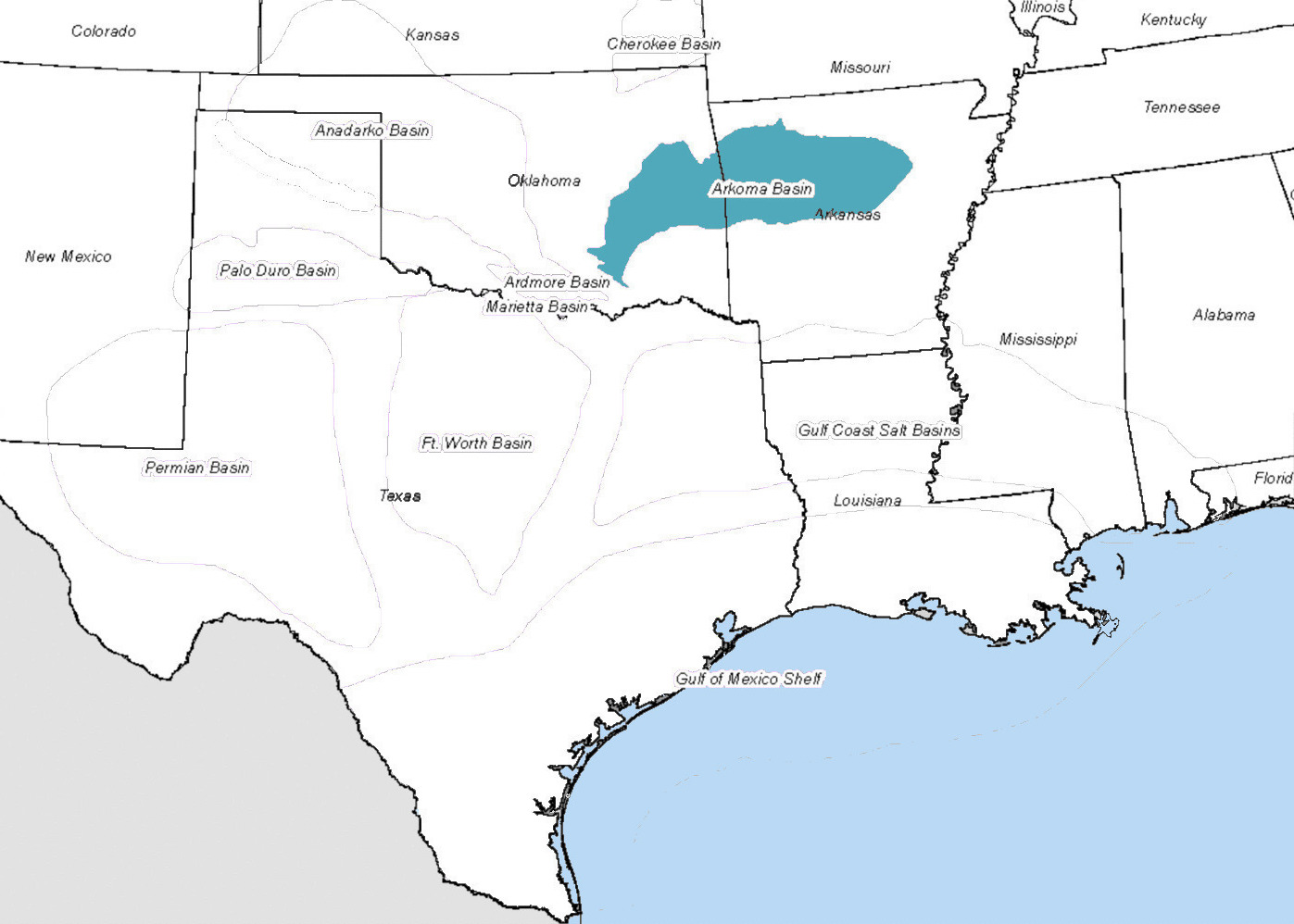
Map of the Arkoma Basin

The Arkoma Basin is a peripheral foreland basin that extends from central west Arkansas to south eastern Oklahoma. The basin lies in between the Ozark Uplift and Oklahoma Platform to the north and Ouachita Mountains to the south and with an area of approximately 33,800 mi^{2}. Along the southern edge of the basin, the Choctaw Fault is the boundary that separates the mountains from the basin itself. This basin is one of seven that lie along the front of the Ouachita and Appalachian mountain systems. This basin is Oklahoma's fourth largest in terms of natural gas production. Oil has been extracted locally, but not on a commercial scale. Coal was the first natural resource used commercially within the basin. Surface mapping of coal seams in the early part of the 20th century lead to the discovery of sub-surface features that indicated the presence of natural gas. Mansfield, Arkansas was the site of the first natural gas discovery in 1902.

== Geologic history ==
The region where the Arkoma basin lies began to take shape with rifting in the early Cambrian. This rifting event resulted in the formation of a deep ocean basin that persisted to the late Devonian. While experts cannot constrain the exact time when the ocean basin began to close, they can infer basin closure beginning around the late Devonian to early Carboniferous. Subduction and subsequent formation of an accretionary prism in the early Pennsylvanian caused normal faulting throughout the basin. By late Atokan time, foreland-style thrusting became predominant as the subduction complex pushed northward against strata. The resultant uplift along the frontal thrust belt of the Ouachitas completed the formation of the foreland basin. Because of this, deformational features become more prominent in the basin towards the southern extent on the north face of the Ouachita Mountains.

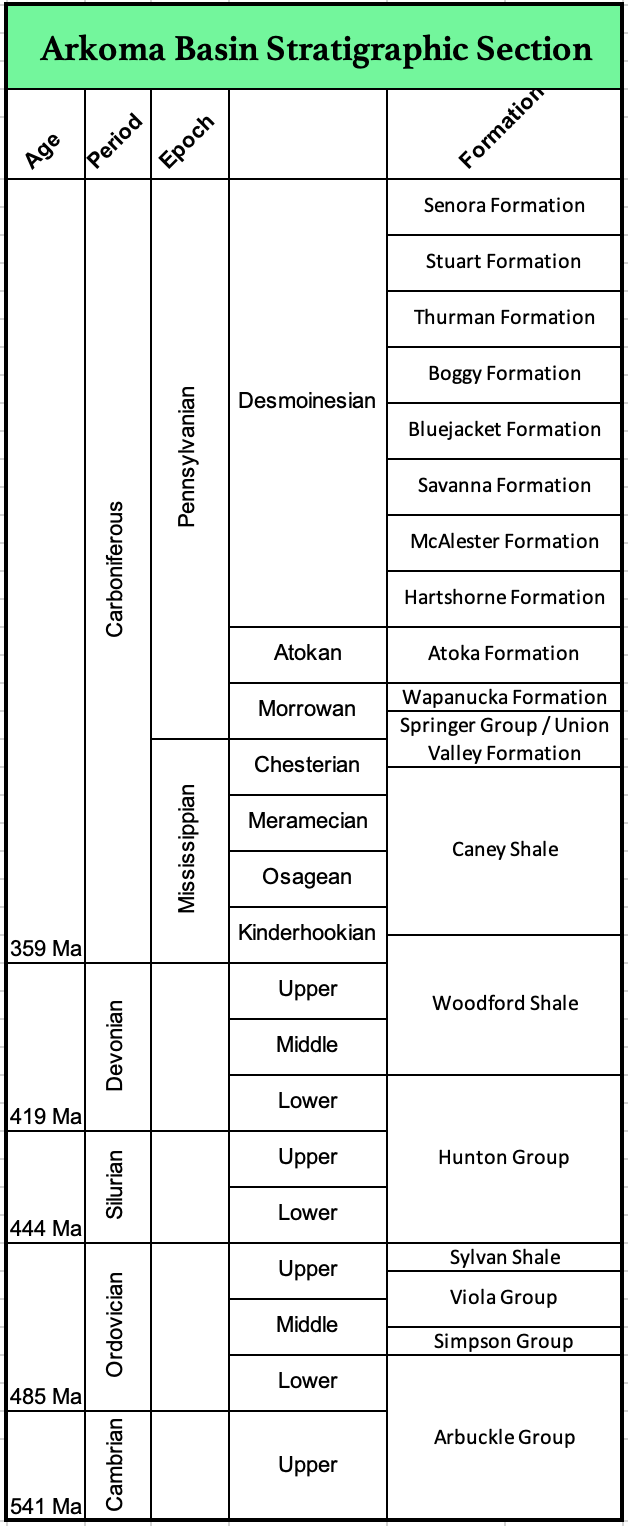
This is the stratigraphy of the Arkoma Basin in Oklahoma. Modified from Suneson 2012

== Stratigraphy ==
Pre-Cambrian granite serves as the basement rock for the Arkoma strata. The ocean basin that was present during the lower Paleozoic is indicated by deep marine shales with subordinate volumes of limestone and quartzose sandstones and bedded chert lie on top of the basement rock. These sequences are referred to collectively as the 'Ouachita Facies' The Mississippian to early Atokan strata indicate a shallow marine environment. Middle Atokan consist primarily of deep-water clastic strata, and are restricted to the southern part of the basin south of its hinge line and to the tectonic belt; the Red Oak sandstone is the best-studied of these reservoirs. The youngest group (Desmoinesian and upper Atokan) consists mostly of fluvial-deltaic sediments (e.g., Hartshorne Formation), some of which show significant tidal influence (e.g., Booch sandstones). Post Atokan strata are shales sandstones and coal beds deposited during final phases of foreland basin sedimentation These strata thicken to the south but do not display abrupt thickening across normal faults indicating that synde positional faulting had ceased.

Four major erosion unconformities have been observed in the stratigraphic record. The formations present in Oklahoma can vary greatly from what is present in Arkansas. The lower Atokan sandstone and the Woodford/Fayetteville Shale can be observed in the eastern and western portions of the basin.

== Structural features ==
=== Block Faulting ===
The Arkoma basin contains block faulting which occurred as a result of tensional forces as the basin subsided [during Pennsylvanian] and the Ozark uplift. These faults, most of which display southward dips, were active during deposition of lower through middle Atokan strata as indicated by significant thickening of those strata across the faults. This feature is more common in the northern part of the basin.

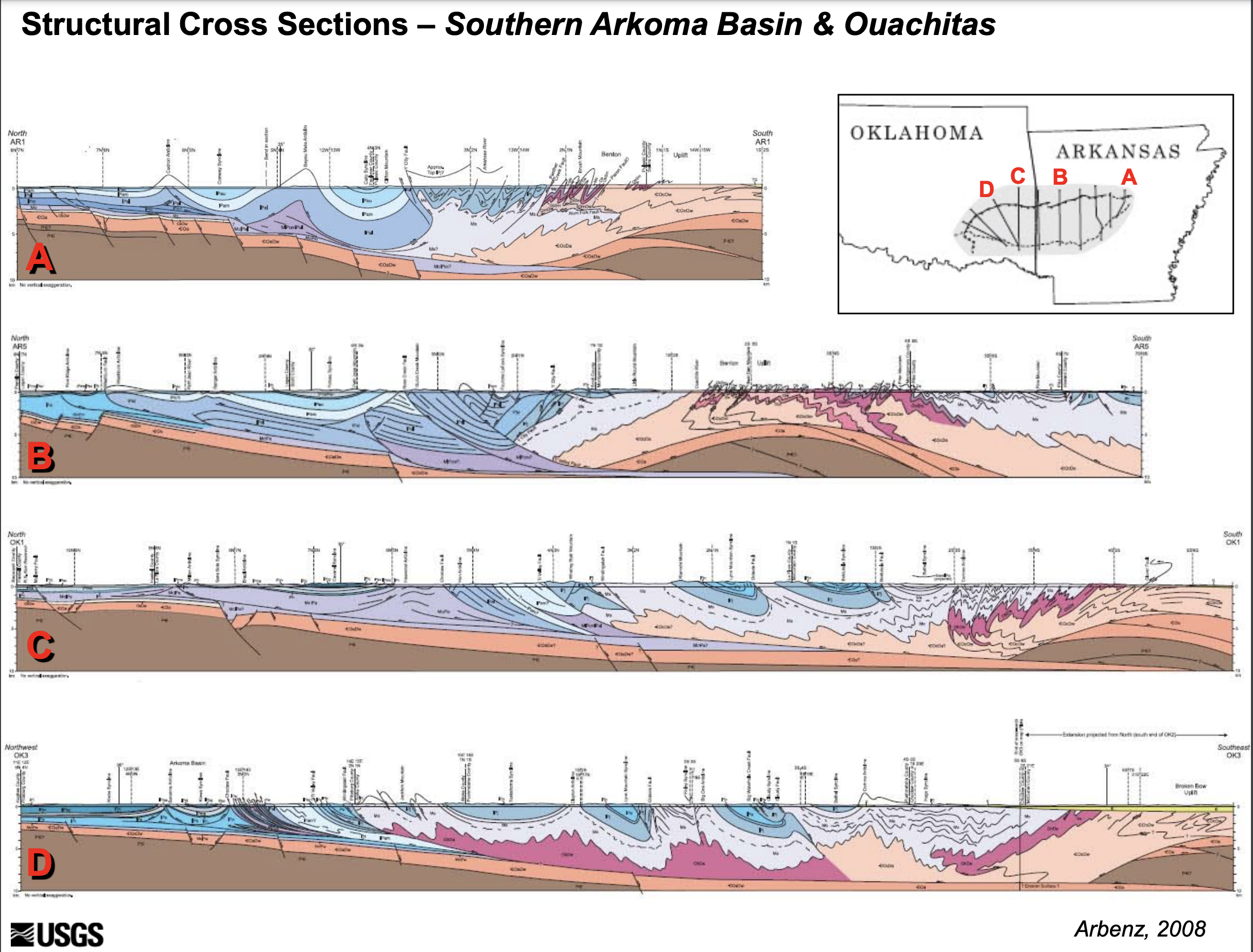
Cross Sections A-D show subsurface features across the Arkoma Basin. Source: USGS

=== Folding and Thrusting ===
This is present in the southern part of the basin as a result of compressional tectonics and north directed thrusting. Within the Arkoma Basin, broad synclines separated by narrow anticlines dominate the basin at surface. Listric thrust faults are known to underlie much of the folded section and ramp to the surface along the crests of many anticlines. These compressional features are a direct result of the Ouachita uplift.

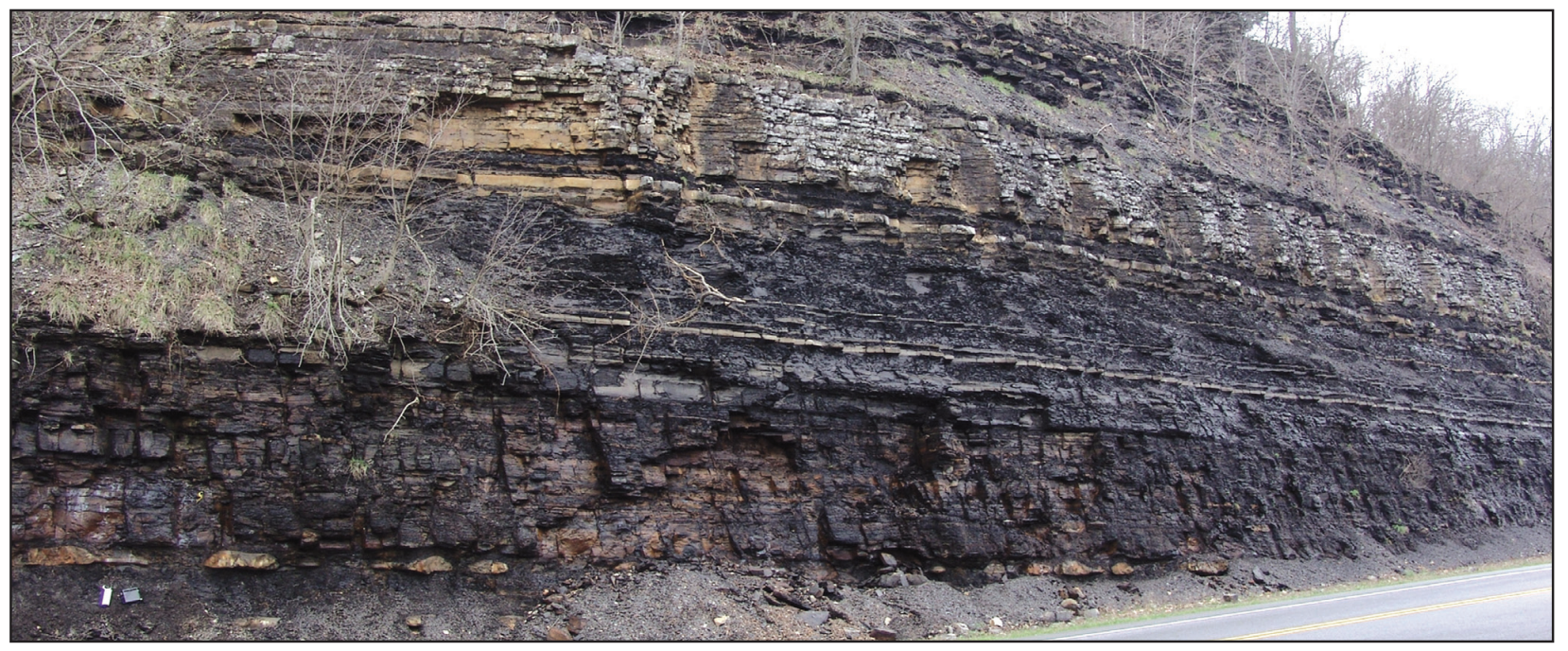
Fayettevill Shale Outctop

== Hydrocarbons ==
Coal was the first hydrocarbon discovered in 1879. It was the primary natural resource extracted from the basin until need for natural gas became more widespread. The coal seams sit on top of the Hartshorne sandstone of the Desmoinesian aged deposits. The surface exploration of coal seams in the Arkoma Basin provided maps which showed closed anticlines and encouraged prospectors to drill for oil and gas. Gas was first discovered in March 1902 in Sebastian County, Arkansas. The first gas commercial well drilled in Oklahoma was completed in 1910. In both Arkansas and Oklahoma, natural resources are produced from the Devonian to Carboniferous aged rocks. The Atoka sandstones can be seen continuously in both the Oklahoma and Arkansas portions of the basin. It is believed that gas formation occurred prior to thrust faulting.

The strata of the Arkoma basin display high thermal maturity as evidenced by vitrinite reflectance (R_{o}) values. These values increase in grade moving from west to east within the basin. In cited literature, the rocks of Red Oak gas field would be considered overmature with an R_{o} value of 3.0%. However, gas production has been prolific in this region.

=== Source Rocks ===
The Woodford/Chattanooga Shale, deposited during the Middle Devonian to Lower Mississippian, is the primary source rock for pre to early Mississippian rocks. Pennsylvanian aged shales rocks sourced Pennsylvanian aged reservoirs with some influence from Chattanooga/Woodford/Caney-sourced hydrocarbons. Oil generation of this formation began in the center of the basin during the Morrowan time (320-300 Ma). The center of the basin experienced increased sedimentation rates during this period thus creating deep burial for organic material. As a result, the basin strata displays high thermal maturity. Hydrocarbons in the center of the basin are classified as Type III kerogen; characteristic of dry gas. The north/northwest corner of the basin is observed to have Type II kerogen that produces oil and wet gas. Four major erosion events along with decreased sedimentation occurred after the Mississippian period delayed gas formation. The oil that was present in the basin cracked to gas 10-30Ma. The erosion events across the basin's history has a more substantial impact the north/northwestern region of the basin causing hydrocarbons to stay on the low end of the gas window.

=== Reservoirs ===
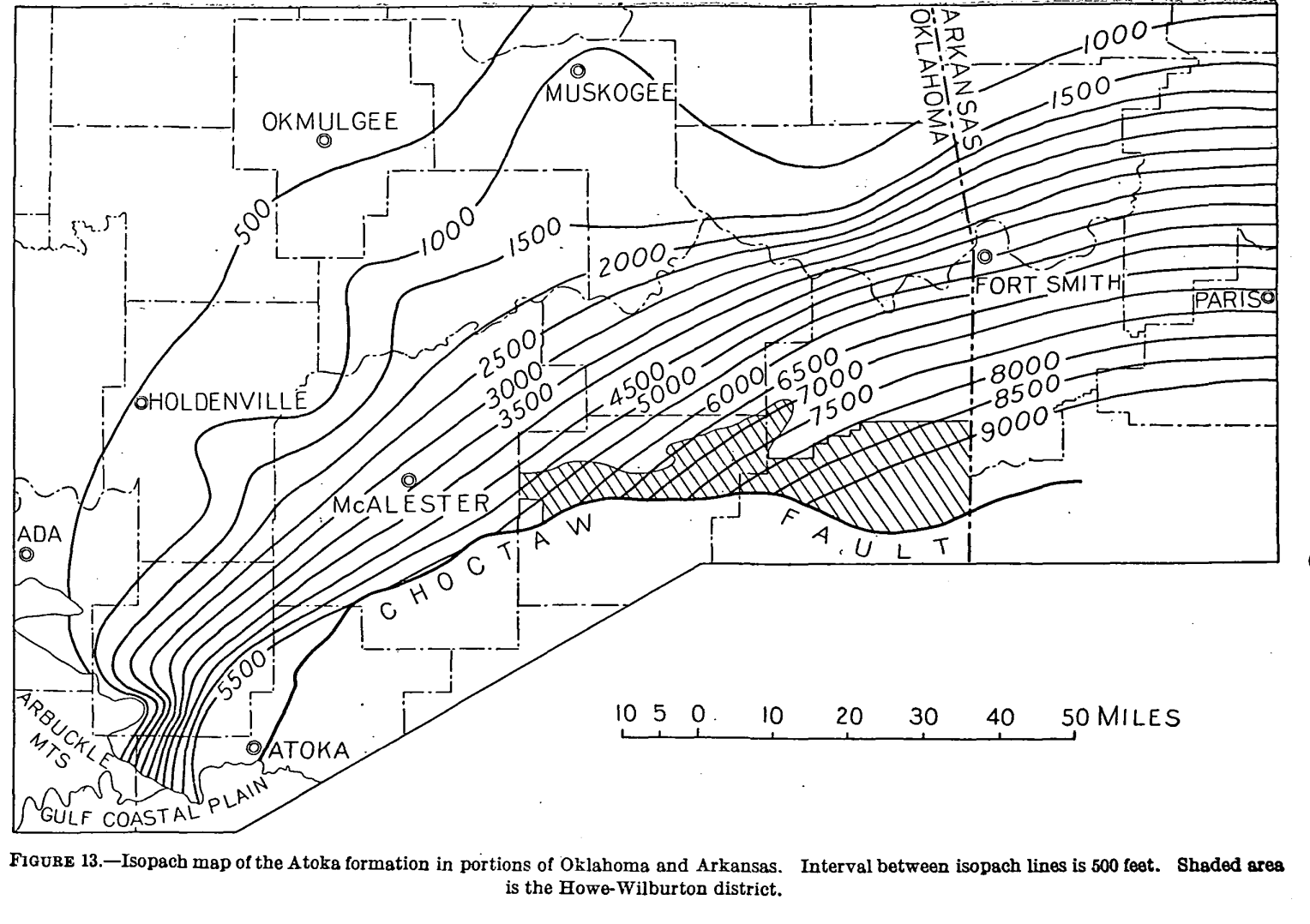

Reservoir rocks of the basin include a variety of sandstones and carbonates. All reservoirs above the Spiro sandstone are lithic to sublithic arenites; no carbonates are present in that part of the section. In older strata, reservoirs are either quartzose sandstones (Spiro, Cromwell, and Simpson) or limestones/dolostones (Wapanucka, Mississippian, Hunton, and Arbuckle).

A 2010 USGS study assessed the reservoir potential within the Woodford/Chattanooga Shale. The study cites 26 trillion ft^{3} of liquid natural gas present within the Devonian-Mississippian aged rocks.

The first Coalbed Methane (CBM) well was drilled in 1998 utilizing horizontal drilling. This introduced a wave of renewed interest in gas extraction within the basin. The pivot to coalbed methane wells along with horizontal wells only lasted a short period; reaching its peak in 2005. After which, pursuit of these technologies all but disappeared.

== Red Oak gas field ==
The Red Oak gas field lies on the axis of the Brazil anticline north and northeast of the town of Red Oak in Latimer County, Oklahoma. The south-dipping San Bois fault, located along the northern edge, is the second regional structure associated with the field. Most of the displacement associated with this normal fault occurred during the deposition of the Atoka formation between the Spiro and Fanshawe sandstones. This is indicated by growth of that section along the fault. This gas field is located in the center of the basin where deep marine facies were not consumed by subduction. The Red Oak field is the largest gas field within the Arkoma basin and the fourth largest in the state of Oklahoma. The first well was drilled in 1912 to a total depth of 1,500 targeting the Hartshorne formation. Prior to 1959, shallow wells ranging from 1,000 ft to 1,500 ft were drilled. In May 1959, Midwest Oil Corporation spudded the No. 1 Orr and drilled into what was later called the Red Oak Sandstone. The No. 1 Orr continued drilling past 11,510 ft. reaching the Sprio sandstone. Within two years, 25 development wells had been completed and ultimate gas recovery was already estimated at more than 1.1 tcf, even though all wells were shut in because there was not yet a pipeline to the field. Of those estimated reserves, 938 bcf were assigned to the Red Oak sandstone and 182 bcf were assigned to the Spiro sandstone.

Drilling in the Red Oak field allowed for the identification of the following productive sandstones within the Atoka Formation: Fanshawe, Red Oak, Panola, Brazil, and Spiro. However, the Spiro, Hartshorne and Red Oak sandstones have been the most significant.

=== Traps ===
The traps present appear to be stratigraphical as reservoir strata was trapped by block faulting then rapidly overlain by younger strata.
