= Mount Judea High School =

Location
- AR 123; Mount Judea, Arkansas 72655; United States
- Coordinates: 35°55′17″N 93°3′33″W

Information
- School type: Public comprehensive
- Status: Open
- School district: Deer/Mount Judea School District
- CEEB code: 041770
- NCES School ID: 050007201630
- Teaching staff: 75.12 (on FTE basis)
- Grades: K–12
- Enrollment: 166 (2023–2024)
- Student to teacher ratio: 2.21
- Education system: ADE Smart Core
- Classes offered: Regular, Advanced Placement (AP)
- Campus type: Rural
- Colors: Blue and white
- Athletics conference: 1A East (2012–14)
- Sports: Basketball, baseball, softball, track
- Mascot: Eagle
- Team name: Mount Judea Eagles
- Accreditation: ADE; AdvancED (1990–)
- Affiliation: Arkansas Activities Association
- Website: www.deermtjudea.k12.ar.us

Mount Judea High School (MJHS) is an accredited comprehensive public high school located in Mount Judea, Arkansas, United States. MJHS provides secondary education for approximately 65 students in grades 7 through 12. It is one of four public high schools in Newton County and one of two high schools administered by the Deer/Mount Judea School District.

It was previously a part of the Mount Judea School District. On July 1, 2004, the Mount Judea district consolidated with the Deer School District to form the Deer/Mount Judea School District.

== Academics ==
Mt. Judea High School is a Title I school that is accredited by the Arkansas Department of Education (ADE). The assumed course of study follows the ADE Smart Core curriculum, which requires students complete at least 22 units prior to graduation. Students complete regular coursework and exams and may take Advanced Placement (AP) courses and exam with the opportunity to receive college credit.

== Athletics ==
The Mount Judea High School mascot for academic and athletic teams is the Eagle with blue and white serving as the school colors.

The Mount Judea Eagles compete in interscholastic activities within the 1A Classification, the state's smallest classification administered by the Arkansas Activities Association. For 2012–14, the Eagles play within the 1A 1 East Conference. Mt. Judea fields junior varsity and varsity teams in basketball (boys/girls), baseball, softball, and track and field (boys/girls).
