= Deer High School =

Location
- AR 16; Deer, Arkansas 72628; United States; 35°49′36″N 93°12′29″W

Information
- School type: Public comprehensive
- Status: Open
- School district: Deer/Mount Judea School District
- NCES District ID: 05000720
- CEEB code: 040585
- NCES School ID: 050007200223
- Staff: 74.87 (on FTE basis)
- Grades: K–12
- Enrollment: 166 (2023–2024)
- Student to teacher ratio: 2.22
- Education system: ADE Smart Core
- Classes offered: Regular, Advanced Placement (AP)
- Campus type: Rural
- Colors: Red and white
- Athletics conference: 1A East (2012–14)
- Sports: Golf, basketball, baseball, softball, track
- Mascot: Deer
- Team name: Deer Antlers
- Accreditation: ADE; AdvancED (1990–)
- Affiliation: Arkansas Activities Association
- Website: www.deermtjudea.k12.ar.us

Deer High School (DHS) is an accredited comprehensive public high school located in Deer, Arkansas, United States. DHS provides secondary education for approximately 77 students in grades 7 through 12. It is one of four public high schools in Newton County and one of two high schools administered by the Deer/Mount Judea School District.

It was previously a part of the Deer School District. On July 1, 2004, the Deer district consolidated with the Mount Judea School District to form the Deer/Mount Judea School District.

== Academics ==
Deer High School is a Title I school that is accredited by the Arkansas Department of Education (ADE). The assumed course of study follows the ADE Smart Core curriculum, which requires students complete at least 22 units prior to graduation. Students complete regular coursework and exams and may take Advanced Placement (AP) courses and exam with the opportunity to receive college credit.

== Athletics ==
The Deer High School mascot for academic and athletic teams is the deer stylized as the Antlers with red and white as the school colors.

The Deer Antlers compete in interscholastic activities within the 1A Classification, the state's smallest classification administered by the Arkansas Activities Association. For 2026-2028, the Antlers played within the 1A-1 Conference.

Deer fields junior varsity and varsity teams in basketball (boys/girls), baseball, softball, track and field (boys/girls), along with cheer and dance.
