= Mount Judea, Arkansas =

- Census-designated place
- Location within Arkansas Location within the United States
- Coordinates: 35°55′17″N 93°03′28″W
- Country: United States
- State: Arkansas
- County: Newton
- Elevation: 942 ft (287 m)

Population (2020)
  - Total: 110
- Time zone: UTC-6 (Central (CST))
  - Summer (DST): UTC-5 (CDT)
- ZIP code: 72655
- Area code: 870
- GNIS feature ID: 2805665

Mount Judea (/ˈdʒuːdiː/ JOO-dee) is an unincorporated community and census-designated place (CDP) in Newton County, Arkansas, United States. Mount Judea is located at the junction of Arkansas highways 74 and 123, 9.5 miles (15.3 km) southeast of Jasper. Mount Judea has a post office with ZIP code 72655.

It was first listed as a CDP in the 2020 census with a population of 110.

== Education ==
Public education for elementary and secondary school students is provided by the Deer/Mount Judea School District, which includes:

- Mount Judea Elementary School
- Mount Judea High School

It was previously a part of the Mount Judea School District. On July 1, 2004, the Mount Judea district consolidated with the Deer School District to form the Deer/Mount Judea School District.

== Demographics ==
Historical population
Census	Pop.	Note	%±
2020	110		—
U.S. Decennial Census; 2020

=== 2020 census ===
Mount Judea CDP, Arkansas – Demographic Profile (NH = Non-Hispanic) Note: the US Census treats Hispanic/Latino as an ethnic category. This table excludes Latinos from the racial categories and assigns them to a separate category. Hispanics/Latinos may be of any race.
Race / Ethnicity	Pop 2020	% 2020
White alone (NH)	104	94.55%
Black or African American alone (NH)	1	0.91%
Native American or Alaska Native alone (NH)	1	0.91%
Asian alone (NH)	1	0.91%
Pacific Islander alone (NH)	0	0.00%
Some Other Race alone (NH)	0	0.00%
Mixed Race/Multi-Racial (NH)	3	2.73%
Hispanic or Latino (any race)	0	0.00%
Total	110	100.00%
