= List of lakes of Newton County, Arkansas =

There are at least 9 named lakes and reservoirs in Newton County, Arkansas.

== Lakes ==
According to the United States Geological Survey, there are no named lakes in Newton County, Arkansas.

== Reservoirs ==
- Edwards Lake, 36°06′54″N 093°12′25″W, el. 1,086 feet (331 m)
- Fowler Lake, 35°57′13″N 093°24′58″W, el. 2,106 feet (642 m)
- Hurricane Lake, 35°54′15″N 092°57′51″W, el. 997 feet (304 m)
- Lower Hurricane Lake, 35°55′35″N 092°57′48″W, el. 902 feet (275 m)
- Mill Creek Hollow Reservoir, 36°04′30″N 093°08′13″W, el. 820 feet (250 m)
- North Pond, 36°03′18″N 093°10′48″W, el. 866 feet (264 m)
- South Pond, 36°03′12″N 093°10′43″W, el. 846 feet (258 m)
- Sycamore Lake, 35°55′35″N 092°57′48″W, el. 902 feet (275 m)
- Weatherby Lake, 36°01′49″N 093°14′31″W, el. 2,096 feet (639 m)

== See also ==
- List of lakes in Arkansas
