= Deer/Mount Judea School District =

School district in Arkansas, United States

Address
- 61 Parker Ridge Road Deer, Arkansas, 72628; United States

District information
- Type: Public
- Grades: PreK–12
- NCES District ID: 0500072

Students and staff
- Students: 428
- Teachers: 58.46
- Staff: 52.0
- Student–teacher ratio: 7.32

Other information
- Website: deermtjudea.k12.ar.us

Deer/Mount Judea School District is a public school district in Newton County, Arkansas, United States.

The school district formed on July 1, 2004, resulting from consolidation of two former school districts based in Deer (Deer School District) and Mount Judea. The district has about 400 square miles (1,000 km^{2}) of space.

Circa 2006 the district received $509,000 in extra state funding due to the rural isolation in the district.

A 2010 report by the University of Arkansas Office for Educational Policy stated that the district had the possibility of its enrollment going below 350 students within five years. This could have possibly forced another consolidation.

== Schools ==
Elementary education:

- Deer Elementary School, serving prekindergarten through grade 6.
- Mount Judea Elementary School, serving prekindergarten through grade 6.

Secondary education:

- Deer High School, serving grades 7 through 12.
- Mount Judea High School, serving grades 7 through 12.
