= Mossville, Arkansas =

- Unincorporated community
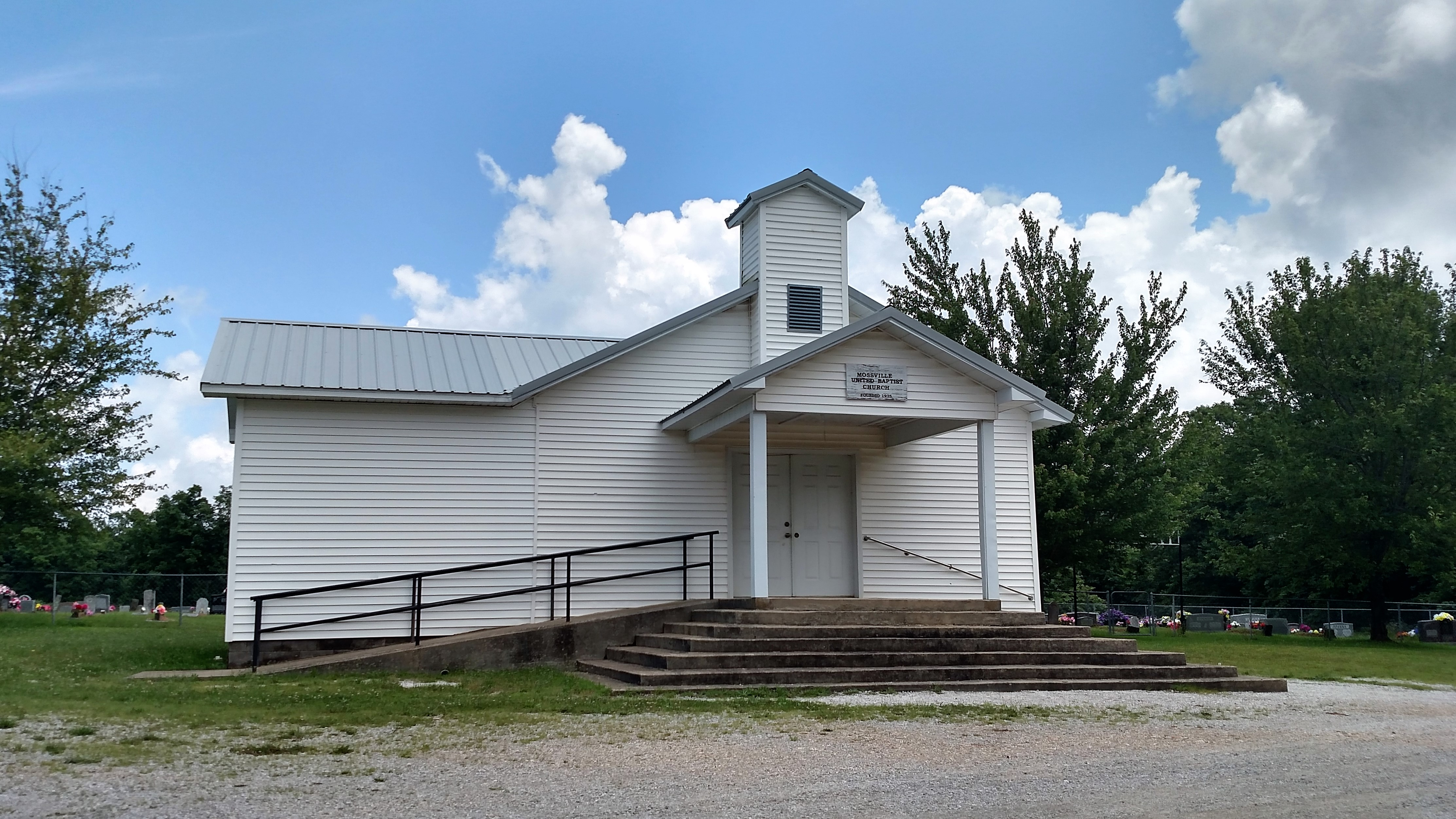
- A church in Mossville

- Location within Arkansas Location within the United States
- Coordinates: 35°53′42″N 93°23′25″W
- Country: United States
- State: Arkansas
- County: Newton
- Elevation: 2,267 ft (691 m)
- Time zone: UTC-6 (Central (CST))
  - Summer (DST): UTC-5 (CDT)
- Area code: 870
- GNIS feature ID: 72744

Mossville is an unincorporated community in Newton County, Arkansas, United States. Mossville has an elevation of 2,267 feet.
