= Upper Buffalo Wilderness =

Protected area in Arkansas, United States

- IUCN category Ib (wilderness area)
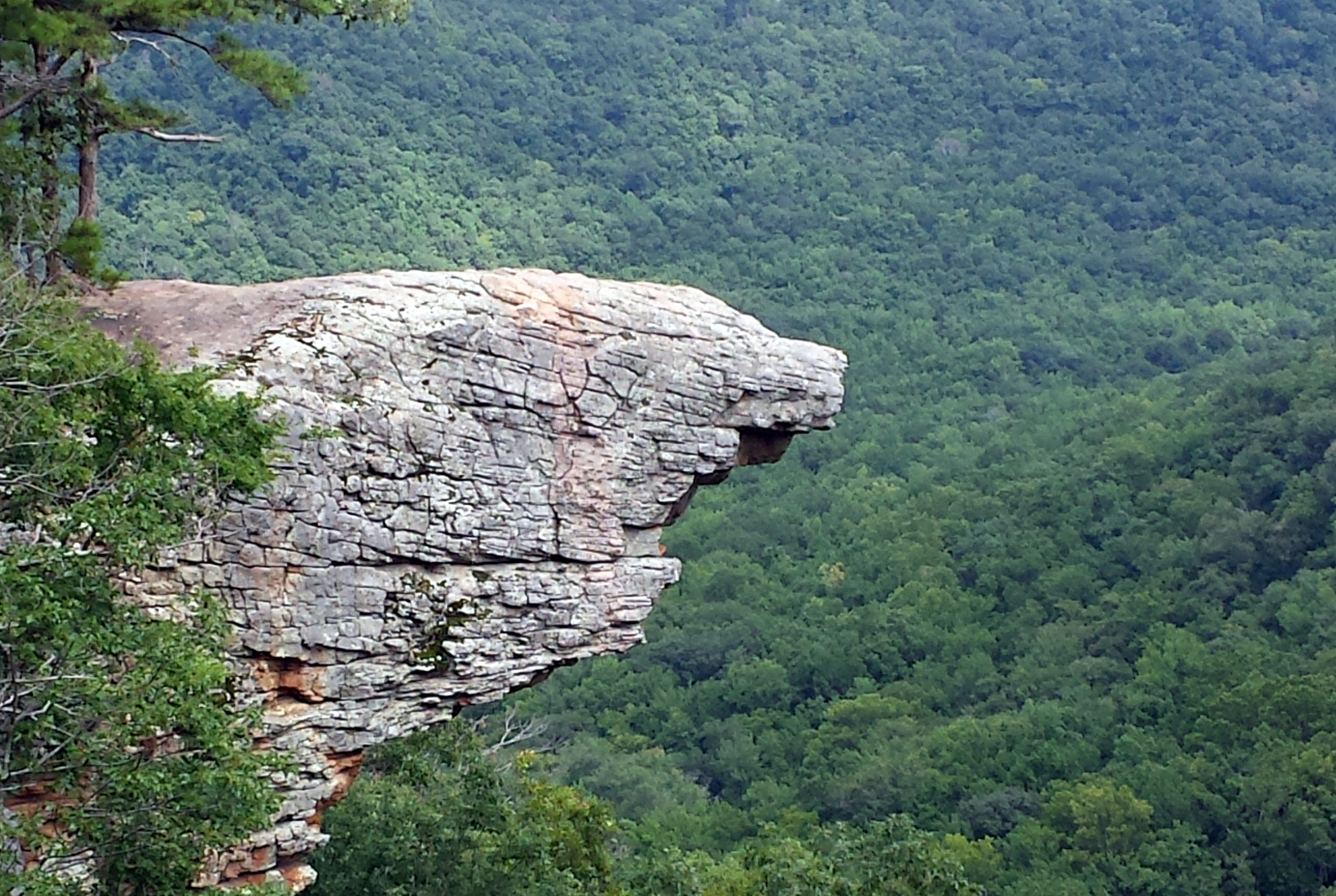
- Hawksbill Crag

- Location within the United States
- Location: Newton County Arkansas, USA
- Nearest city: Jasper
- Coordinates: 35°53′50″N 93°27′26″W
- Area: 12,108 acres (4,900 ha)
- Established: 1974
- Governing body: U.S. Forest Service

Upper Buffalo Wilderness is located in the U.S. state of Arkansas. Created by an act of Congress in 1974, the wilderness covers an area of 12,108 acres (49 km²). Contained within Ozark-St. Francis National Forest, the wilderness is managed by the U.S. Forest Service. Contained in the wilderness is Hawksbill Crag (also called Whitaker Point), a very popular hiking destination.

== Description ==
This infrequently visited wilderness is composed of second and third growth oak-hickory forest with intermittent portions of shortleaf pine. The headwaters of the Buffalo River are contained in the Wilderness, and the area has been uninhabited since 1948. Decaying houses, farm implements and roads can still be seen in countless valleys. There is only one official trail in the Upper Buffalo Wilderness, leading visitors to Hawksbill Crag. Visitors should expect difficult hiking conditions although water is extremely pure. Black bears are known to inhabit the wilderness, along with White-tailed deer, wild turkey, skunks, opossums, minks and pheasants.

U.S. Wilderness Areas do not allow motorized or mechanized vehicles, including bicycles. Although camping and fishing are usually allowed with a proper permit, no roads or buildings are constructed and there is also no logging or mining, in compliance with the 1964 Wilderness Act. Wilderness areas within National Forests and Bureau of Land Management areas also allow hunting in season.

== See also ==
- List of U.S. Wilderness Areas
