= Deer, Arkansas =

- Census-designated place
- Location within Arkansas Location within the United States
- Coordinates: 35°49′26″N 93°13′23″W
- Country: United States
- State: Arkansas
- County: Newton
- Elevation: 2,028 ft (618 m)

Population (2020)
  - Total: 135
- Demonym(s): Deerian, Deeronian
- Time zone: UTC-6 (Central (CST))
  - Summer (DST): UTC-5 (CDT)
- ZIP code: 72628
- Area code: 870
- GNIS feature ID: 2805635

Deer is an unincorporated community and census-designated place (CDP) in Newton County, Arkansas, United States. Deer is located on Arkansas Highway 16, 12.5 miles (20.1 km) south of Jasper. Deer has a post office with ZIP code 72628.

It was first listed as a CDP in the 2020 census with a population of 135.

== Education ==
Public education for elementary and secondary school students is provided by the Deer/Mount Judea School District, which includes:

- Deer Elementary School
- Deer High School
- Deer Community College of Agricultural Science

On July 1, 2004, the Deer School District consolidated with the Mount Judea School District to form the Deer/Mount Judea School District.

== Demographics ==
Historical population
Census	Pop.	Note	%±
2020	135		—
U.S. Decennial Census; 2020

=== 2020 census ===
Deer CDP, Arkansas – Racial and ethnic composition Note: the US Census treats Hispanic/Latino as an ethnic category. This table excludes Latinos from the racial categories and assigns them to a separate category. Hispanics/Latinos may be of any race.
Race / Ethnicity (NH = Non-Hispanic)	Pop 2020	% 2020
White alone (NH)	131	97.04%
Black or African American alone (NH)	0	0.00%
Native American or Alaska Native alone (NH)	2	1.48%
Asian alone (NH)	0	0.00%
Pacific Islander alone (NH)	0	0.00%
Some Other Race alone (NH)	0	0.00%
Mixed Race or Multi-Racial (NH)	1	0.74%
Hispanic or Latino (any race)	1	0.74%
Total	135	100.00%

== Climate ==
Due to its altitude, Deer is perhaps the only populated place in the central USA with a humid continental climate (Cfa) that borders on a temperate highland climate (Cfb), with average highs and lows comparable to parts of Western Oregon or Lyon, France.

Climate data for Deer, Arkansas (Elevation 2,375ft)
Month	Jan	Feb	Mar	Apr	May	Jun	Jul	Aug	Sep	Oct	Nov	Dec	Year
Record high °F (°C)	69 (21)	78 (26)	83 (28)	88 (31)	85 (29)	92 (33)	102 (39)	106 (41)	97 (36)	86 (30)	79 (26)	70 (21)	106 (41)
Mean daily maximum °F (°C)	41.3 (5.2)	46.2 (7.9)	55.5 (13.1)	64.6 (18.1)	70.7 (21.5)	78.4 (25.8)	83.1 (28.4)	83.2 (28.4)	75.6 (24.2)	65.3 (18.5)	54.5 (12.5)	44.3 (6.8)	63.6 (17.6)
Mean daily minimum °F (°C)	23.1 (−4.9)	27.0 (−2.8)	35.2 (1.8)	44.5 (6.9)	53.6 (12.0)	62.3 (16.8)	66.9 (19.4)	66.1 (18.9)	58.4 (14.7)	47.3 (8.5)	36.8 (2.7)	26.6 (−3.0)	45.7 (7.6)
Record low °F (°C)	−20 (−29)	−10 (−23)	1 (−17)	16 (−9)	31 (−1)	44 (7)	52 (11)	45 (7)	33 (1)	15 (−9)	4 (−16)	−13 (−25)	−20 (−29)
Average precipitation inches (mm)	3.17 (81)	3.70 (94)	5.57 (141)	5.23 (133)	6.65 (169)	4.58 (116)	3.53 (90)	3.55 (90)	4.49 (114)	4.51 (115)	5.92 (150)	4.33 (110)	55.24 (1,403)
Average snowfall inches (cm)	4.0 (10)	4.2 (11)	1.8 (4.6)	0.3 (0.76)	0 (0)	0 (0)	0 (0)	0 (0)	0 (0)	0 (0)	0.6 (1.5)	1.7 (4.3)	12.6 (32)
Source: The Western Regional Climate Center
