= Hasty, Arkansas =

- Unincorporated community
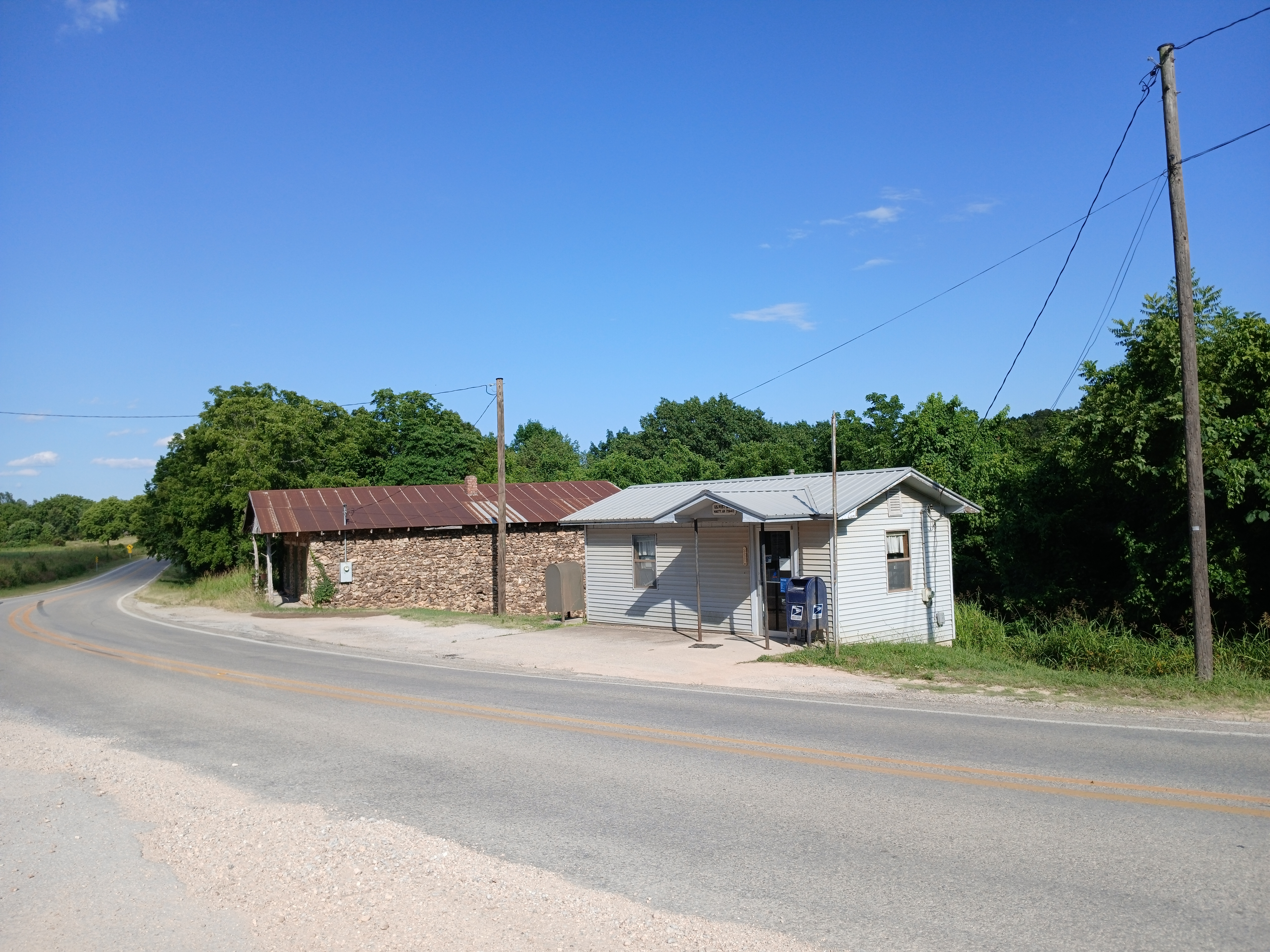
- Hasty post office, July 2024

- Location within Arkansas Location within the United States
- Coordinates: 36°00′54″N 93°02′52″W
- Country: United States
- State: Arkansas
- County: Newton
- Elevation: 1,227 ft (374 m)
- Time zone: UTC-6 (Central (CST))
  - Summer (DST): UTC-5 (CDT)
- ZIP code: 72640
- Area code: 870
- GNIS feature ID: 77142

Hasty is an unincorporated community in Newton County, Arkansas, United States. Hasty is located on Arkansas Highway 123, 8 miles (13 km) east of Jasper. Hasty has a post office with ZIP code 72640.
