= Wayton, Arkansas =

- Census-designated place
- Location within Arkansas Location within the United States
- Coordinates: 35°54′37″N 93°15′16″W
- Country: United States
- State: Arkansas
- County: Newton
- Elevation: 1,982 ft (604 m)

Population (2020)
  - Total: 148
- Time zone: UTC-6 (Central (CST))
  - Summer (DST): UTC-5 (CDT)
- Area code: 870
- GNIS feature ID: 2805696

Wayton is an unincorporated community and census-designated place (CDP) in Newton County, Arkansas, United States. Wayton is located on Arkansas Highway 327, 8 miles (13 km) south-southwest of Jasper.

It was first listed as a CDP in the 2020 census with a population of 148.

== Demographics ==
Historical population
Census	Pop.	Note	%±
2020	148		—
U.S. Decennial Census; 2020

=== 2020 census ===
Wayton CDP, Arkansas – Demographic Profile (NH = Non-Hispanic) Note: the US Census treats Hispanic/Latino as an ethnic category. This table excludes Latinos from the racial categories and assigns them to a separate category. Hispanics/Latinos may be of any race.
Race / Ethnicity	Pop 2020	% 2020
White alone (NH)	137	92.57%
Black or African American alone (NH)	0	0.00%
Native American or Alaska Native alone (NH)	0	0.00%
Asian alone (NH)	5	3.38%
Pacific Islander alone (NH)	0	0.00%
Some Other Race alone (NH)	2	1.35%
Mixed Race/Multi-Racial (NH)	2	1.35%
Hispanic or Latino (any race)	2	1.35%
Total	148	100.00%
