= Arkansas Highway 327 =

State highway in Arkansas, United States

Highway 327

Route information
- Maintained by ArDOT
- Length: 10.97 mi (17.65 km)

Major junctions
- South end: Ozark National Forest boundary in Wayton.
- North end: AR 74 near Jasper

Location
- Country: United States
- State: Arkansas
- Counties: Newton

Highway system
- Arkansas Highway System; Interstate; US; State; Business; Spurs; Suffixed; Scenic; Heritage
← AR 326	→ AR 328

Highway 327 (AR 327, Ark. 327, and Hwy. 327) is a 10.97-mile (17.65 km) north-south state highway located entirely within Newton County in northern Arkansas. The highway runs from the northern boundary of the Ozark National Forest in Wayton north to Arkansas Highway 74 near Jasper. The route serves a forested region, connecting Wayton and Jasper with the community of Parthenon. It does not meet any highways between its termini. Highway 327 is maintained by the Arkansas State Highway and Transportation Department (AHTD).

== Route description ==
Highway 327 begins at the northern border of the Ozark National Forest in Wayton. The highway follows a curvaceous path northward through a rural, forested area. The route then turns east toward Parthenon, crossing Fork Shop Creek at the edge of the community. After passing through Parthenon, the highway continues north along the east bank of the Little Buffalo River. It crosses the river, then continues past a cemetery and intersects a paved road near a creek. Now running along the west bank of the river, the route continues north toward Jasper. After reaching Jasper, it runs along its border on the opposite side of the river, entering another section of the Ozark National Forest. The route terminates at Highway 74 north of Jasper; Highway 74 accesses the city via Highway 7.

== History ==
In 1952, a gravel road along the present route of Highway 327 was first marked on state highway maps. The highway was designated between Jasper and Parthenon in 1966, following its current alignment between the communities. In 1979, the designated portion of Highway 327 was paved. The portion of Highway 327 south of Parthenon was designated later and paved in 1995.

== Major intersections ==
The entire route is in Newton County.

Location	mi^{[a]}	km	Destinations	Notes
Wayton	10.97	17.65	Ozark National Forest boundary	Southern terminus
Jasper	0.00	0.00	AR 74 – Mount Sherman, Ponca, Jasper	Northern terminus
1.000 mi = 1.609 km; 1.000 km = 0.621 mi

== See also ==
- List of state highways in Arkansas

== Notes ==
- ^{a} The Arkansas State Highway and Transportation Department measures the mileage of Highway 327 from north to south.
