= Edwards Lake =

- Location within Georgia
- Location: Bibb County, Georgia
- Coordinates: 32°48′35″N 83°33′15″W
- Type: reservoir

Edwards Lake is a reservoir in the U.S. state of Georgia.

Edwards Lake was named after Harry Stillwell Edwards, the original owner of the site.
