= Deer School District =

Defunct school district in Arkansas, United States

Deer School District was a school district headquartered in Deer, Arkansas.

Its sole school was the Deer School, divided into primary and secondary divisions.

On July 1, 2004, it consolidated with the Mount Judea School District to form the Deer/Mount Judea School District.
