= Newton County, Arkansas =

County in Arkansas, United States

- County
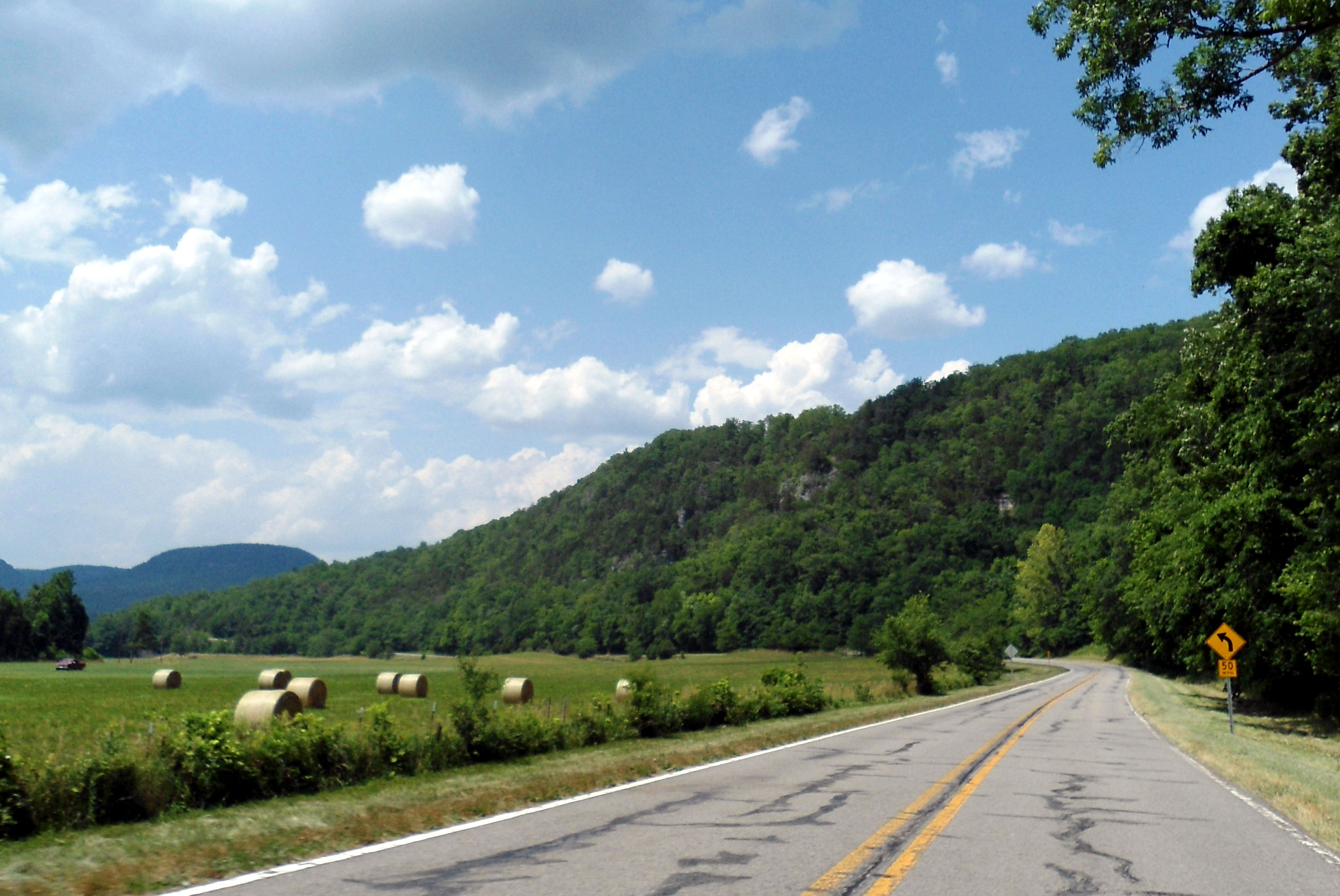
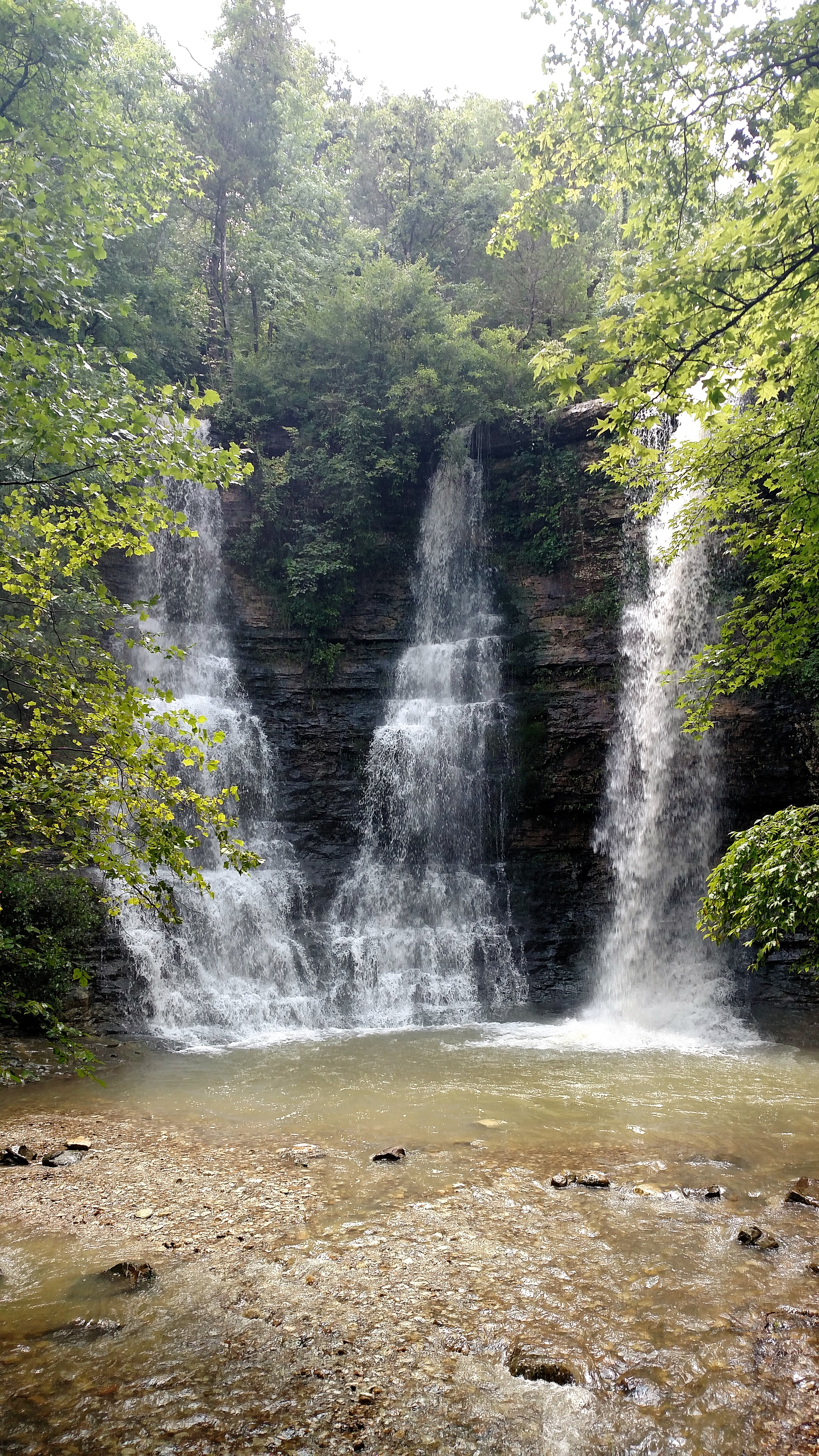
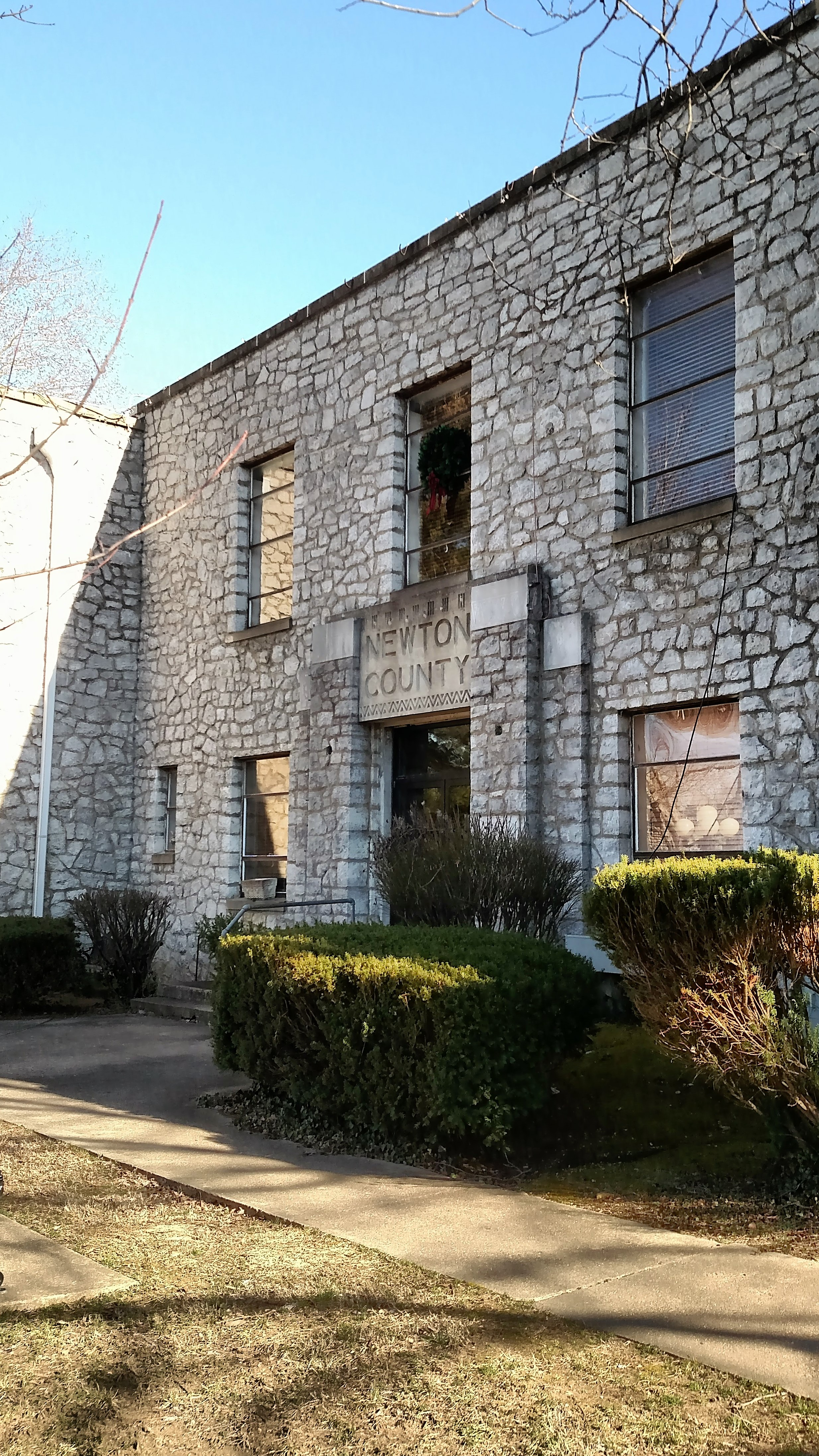
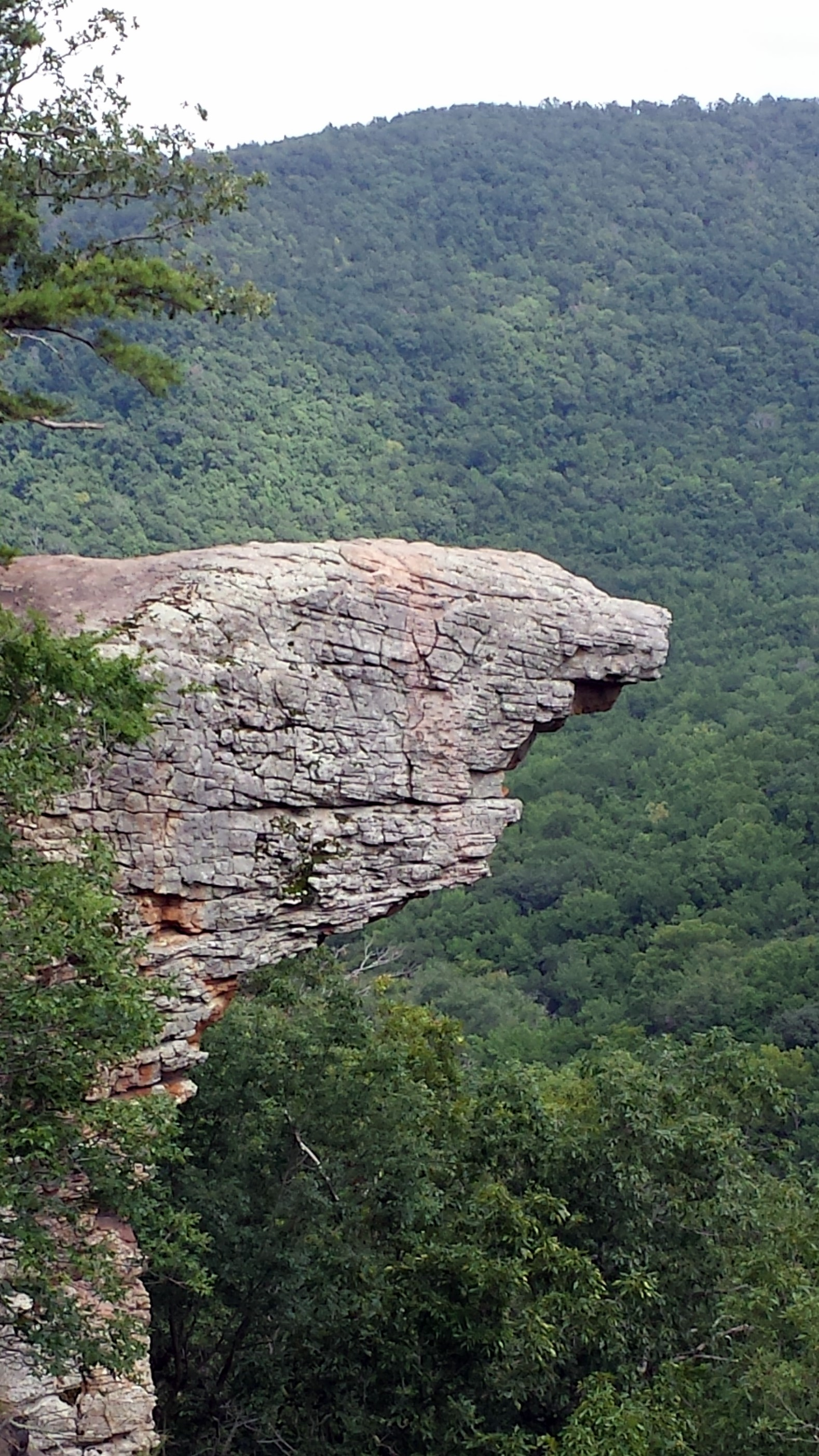
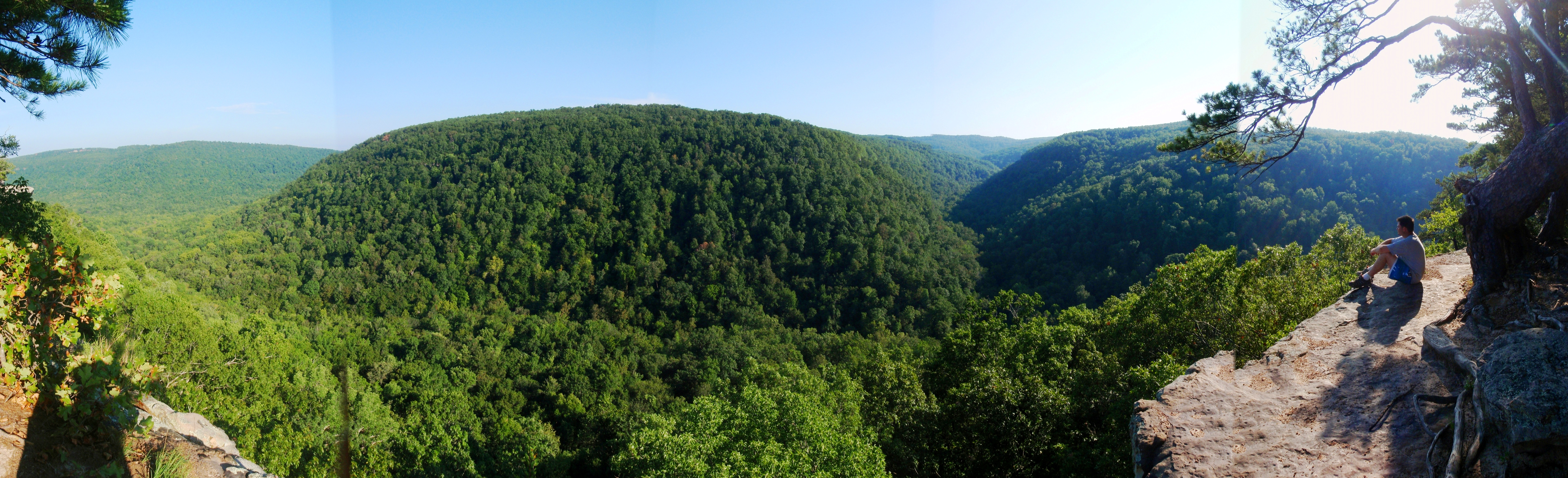
- Clockwise from top: Boxley Valley, Hawksbill Crag, the Ozark Mountains in the Upper Buffalo Wilderness, Twin/Triple Falls at Camp Orr Boy Scout Camp, and the Newton County Courthouse in Jasper (center)

- Location within the U.S. state of Arkansas
- Coordinates: 35°56′08″N 93°13′19″W
- Country: United States
- State: Arkansas
- Founded: December 14, 1842
- Named for: Thomas Willoughby Newton
- Seat: Jasper
- Largest city: Jasper

Area
  - Total: 823 sq mi (2,130 km^{2})
  - Land: 821 sq mi (2,130 km^{2})
  - Water: 2.3 sq mi (6.0 km^{2}) 0.3%

Population (2020)
  - Total: 7,225
  - Estimate (2025): 7,026 ▼
  - Density: 8.80/sq mi (3.40/km^{2})
- Time zone: UTC−6 (Central)
  - Summer (DST): UTC−5 (CDT)
- Congressional district: 4th

Newton County is a county in the U.S. state of Arkansas. As of the 2020 census, the population was 7,225. The county seat is Jasper. Newton County is Arkansas's 46th county, formed on December 14, 1842, and named for Thomas W. Newton, an Arkansas Congressman.

Newton County is part of the Harrison, AR Micropolitan Statistical Area.

It is an alcohol prohibition or dry county.

== History ==
Newton County residents were divided during the Civil War, serving in both the Confederate and Union armies. John Cecil, who had served as Newton County's sheriff, served as a Confederate Captain. Jasper blacksmith James R. Vanderpool (ca. 1832–1880) served as Captain of Union Company C, 1st Regiment Arkansas Infantry Volunteers, while farmer and teacher John McCoy (1820–1903) served as Captain of Union Company F, 1st Regiment Arkansas Infantry Volunteers. Many Newton County citizens served under each of these men, as well as in other units. As an example of how the war divided families, Confederate Captain Cecil's brother, Sam, served as a sergeant in Union Company D, 2nd Regiment Arkansas Cavalry Volunteers. Violence took a severe toll on the civilian population, and at one point, Captains McCoy and Vanderpool escorted 20 wagons of Unionist families from Newton County to Missouri to seek refuge.

== Geography ==
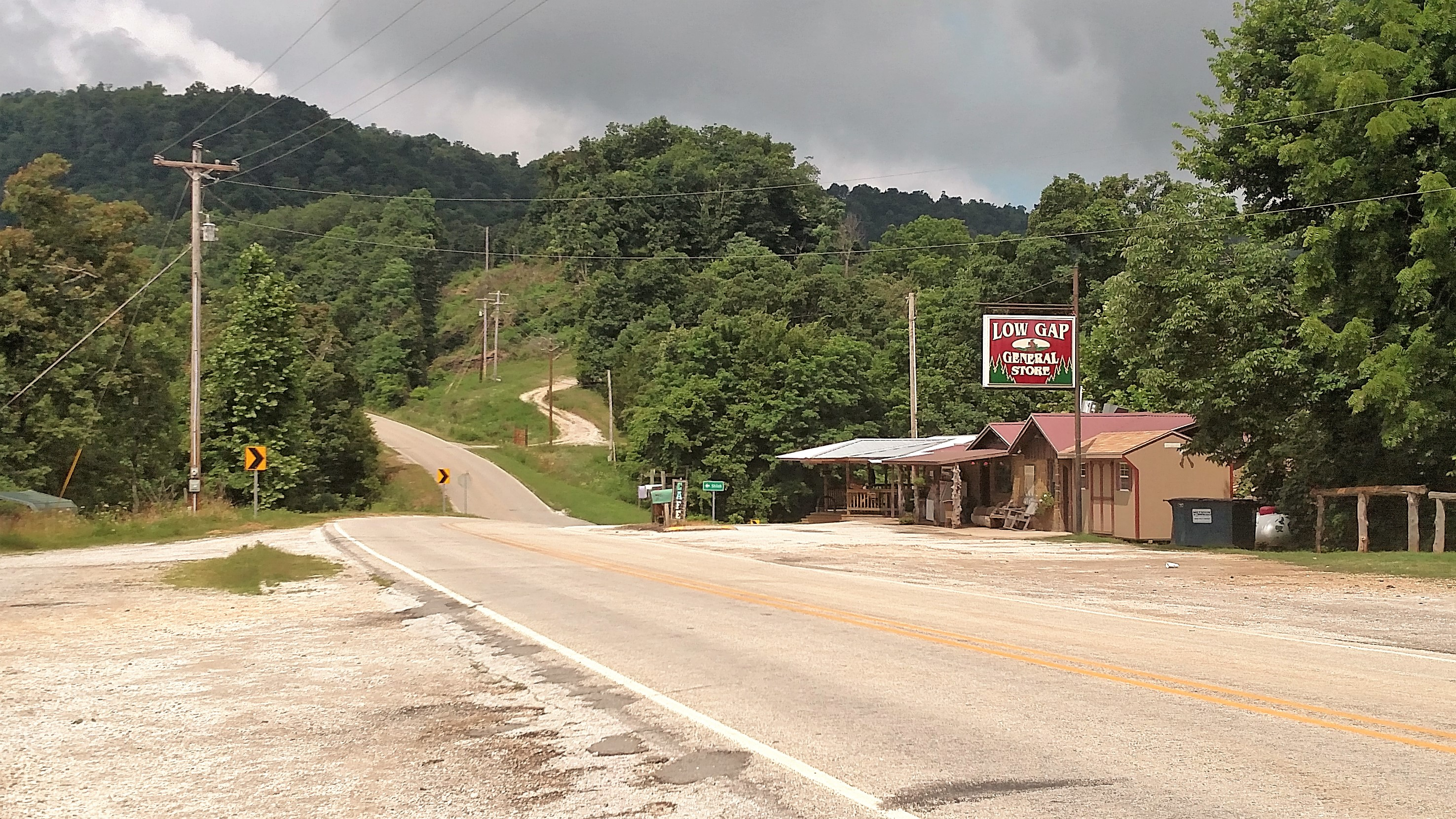
Low Gap community within the Boston Mountains along Highway 74

According to the U.S. Census Bureau, the county has a total area of 823 square miles (2,130 km^{2}), of which 821 square miles (2,130 km^{2}) is land and 2.3 square miles (6.0 km^{2}) (0.3%) is water.

Newton County lies almost entirely within the rugged Boston Mountain range of the Ozark Mountains where elevations exceed 2,500 feet (760 m). The Buffalo National River, a popular destination for canoeing and recreation, runs through the county from west to east. Highway 7, which traverses the county from north to south, has been rated as one of the most scenic drives in the country.

=== Adjacent counties ===
- Boone County (north)
- Searcy County (east)
- Pope County (southeast)
- Johnson County (south)
- Madison County (west)
- Carroll County (northwest)

=== Protected areas ===
- Buffalo National River (part)
- Ozark National Forest (part)
- Upper Buffalo Wilderness
- Mystic Cavern
- White Rock Wildlife Management Area (part)

== Demographics ==
Historical population
Census	Pop.	Note	%±
1850	1,758		—
1860	3,393		93.0%
1870	4,374		28.9%
1880	6,120		39.9%
1890	9,950		62.6%
1900	12,538		26.0%
1910	10,612		−15.4%
1920	11,199		5.5%
1930	10,564		−5.7%
1940	10,881		3.0%
1950	8,685		−20.2%
1960	5,963		−31.3%
1970	5,844		−2.0%
1980	7,756		32.7%
1990	7,666		−1.2%
2000	8,608		12.3%
2010	8,330		−3.2%
2020	7,225		−13.3%
2025 (est.)	7,026	▼	−2.8%
U.S. Decennial Census; 1790–1960 1900–1990; 1990–2000 2010

=== 2020 census ===
As of the 2020 census, the county had a population of 7,225. The median age was 51.6 years. 18.0% of residents were under the age of 18 and 28.8% of residents were 65 years of age or older. For every 100 females there were 101.2 males, and for every 100 females age 18 and over there were 101.0 males age 18 and over.

The racial makeup of the county was 92.6% White, 0.1% Black or African American, 1.0% American Indian and Alaska Native, 0.3% Asian, <0.1% Native Hawaiian and Pacific Islander, 0.4% from some other race, and 5.6% from two or more races. Hispanic or Latino residents of any race comprised 1.1% of the population.

<0.1% of residents lived in urban areas, while 100.0% lived in rural areas.

There were 3,169 households in the county, of which 23.1% had children under the age of 18 living in them. Of all households, 51.2% were married-couple households, 21.0% were households with a male householder and no spouse or partner present, and 23.5% were households with a female householder and no spouse or partner present. About 32.2% of all households were made up of individuals and 18.1% had someone living alone who was 65 years of age or older.

There were 4,086 housing units, of which 22.4% were vacant. Among occupied housing units, 82.4% were owner-occupied and 17.6% were renter-occupied. The homeowner vacancy rate was 2.4% and the rental vacancy rate was 8.0%.

=== 2000 census ===
As of the 2000 census, there were 8,608 people, 3,500 households, and 2,495 families residing in the county. The population density was 4/km^{2} (10/sq mi), one of the most sparse among county populations in Arkansas. There were 4,316 housing units at an average density of 5 per square mile (1.9/km^{2}). The racial makeup of the county was 99.29% White, 0.00% Black or African American, 0.56% Native American, 0.06% Asian, 0.00% Pacific Islander, 0.09% from other races, and 0.00% from two or more races. 0.00% of the population were Hispanic or Latino of any race.

There were 3,500 households, out of which 32.20% had children under the age of 18 living with them, 60.00% were married couples living together, 7.70% had a female householder with no husband present, and 28.70% were non-families. 26.00% of all households were made up of individuals, and 10.90% had someone living alone who was 65 years of age or older. The average household size was 2.44 and the average family size was 2.94.

In the county, the population was spread out, with 24.90% under the age of 18, 7.60% from 18 to 24, 25.00% from 25 to 44, 27.60% from 45 to 64, and 14.80% who were 65 years of age or older. The median age was 40 years. For every 100 females, there were 102.30 males. For every 100 females age 18 and over, there were 98.60 males.

The median income for a household in the county was $24,756, and the median income for a family was $30,134. Males had a median income of $22,406 versus $17,654 for females. The per capita income for the county was $13,788. About 15.70% of families and 20.40% of the population were below the poverty line, including 27.80% of those under age 18 and 16.90% of those age 65 or over.

Native residents of Newton County were interviewed in 1970 for research being done by a doctoral student at the University of Arkansas in Fayetteville. A Ph.D. degree was awarded to Bethany K. Dumas in May 1971 after she completed "A Study of the Dialect of Newton County, Arkansas." Results are discussed in two of her published articles/chapters: "The Morphology of Newton County, Arkansas: An Exercise in Studying Ozark Dialect," Mid–South Folklore 3 (1975), 115–125, and "Southern Mountain English" Chapter 5 of The Workings of Language, ed. R. S. Wheeler, Westport, CT, and London: Praeger, 1999, 67–79.

== Government ==
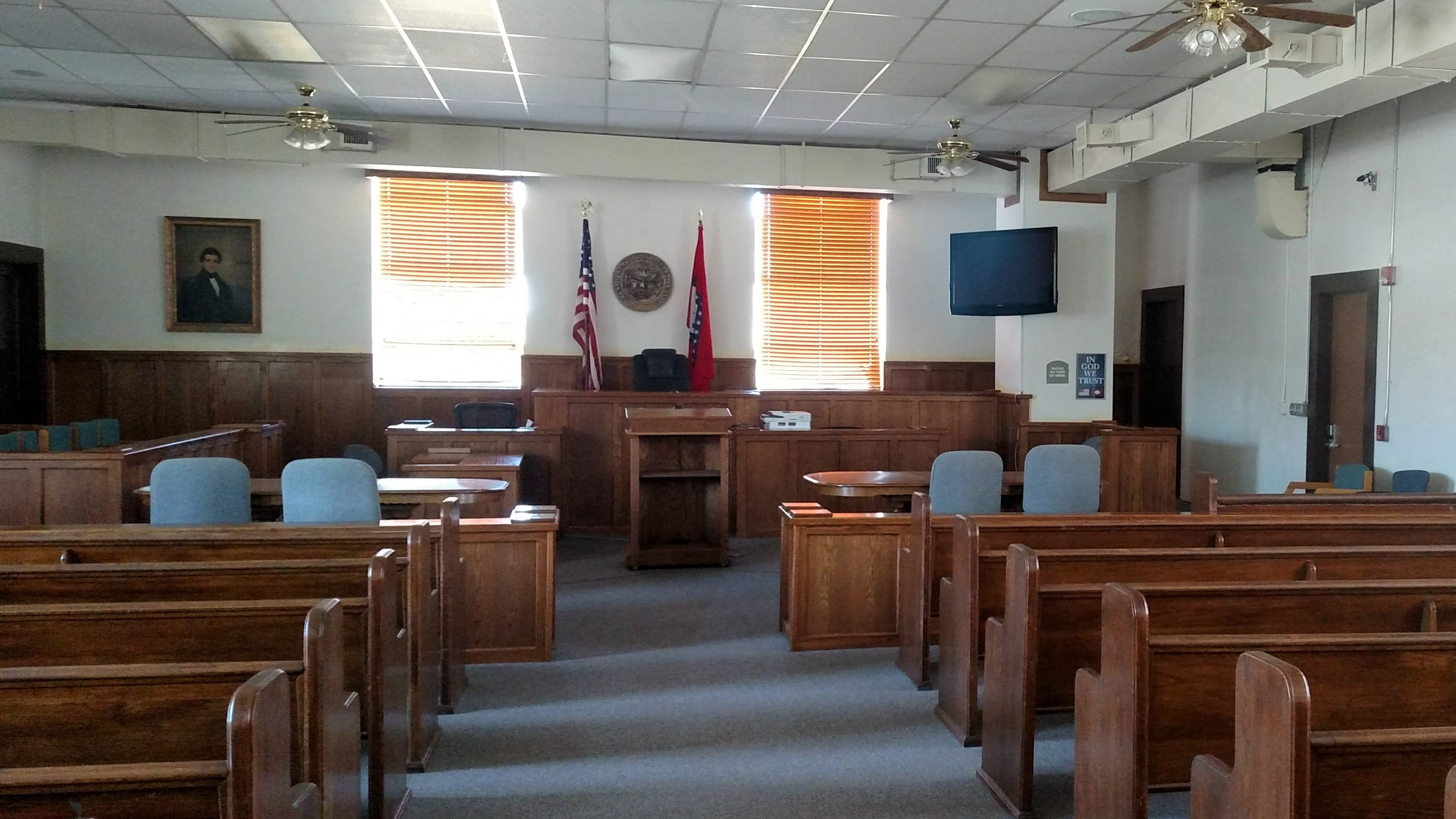
Courtroom interior at the Newton County Courthouse

The county government is a constitutional body granted specific powers by the Constitution of Arkansas and the Arkansas Code. The quorum court is the legislative branch of the county government and controls all spending and revenue collection. Representatives are called justices of the peace and are elected from county districts every even-numbered year. The number of districts in a county vary from nine to fifteen, and district boundaries are drawn by the county election commission. The Newton County Quorum Court has nine members. Presiding over quorum court meetings is the county judge, who serves as the chief operating officer of the county. The county judge is elected at-large and does not vote in quorum court business, although capable of vetoing quorum court decisions.

Newton County, Arkansas Elected countywide officials
Position	Officeholder	Party
County Judge	Warren Campbell	Republican
County/Circuit Clerk	Donnie Davis	Republican
Sheriff	Glenn Wheeler	Republican
Treasurer	Vickie Bartholomew	Republican
Collector	Nedra Daniels	Republican
Assessor	Stephen Willis	Republican
Coroner	Cody Middleton	Republican

The composition of the Quorum Court following the 2024 elections is 8 Republicans and 1 Independent. Justices of the Peace (members) of the Quorum Court following the elections are:

- District 1: Jamie Mefford (R)
- District 2: Richard Campbell (R)
- District 3: Terry Clark (R)
- District 4: Dennis Sain (I)
- District 5: Jerry Lee (R)
- District 6: Chris Martin (R)
- District 7: Steven Adams (R)
- District 8: Arlis Jones (R)
- District 9: John David Phillips (R)

Additionally, the townships of Newton County are entitled to elect their own respective constables, as set forth by the Constitution of Arkansas. Constables are largely of historical significance as they were used to keep the peace in rural areas when travel was more difficult. The township constables as of the 2024 elections are:

- Hickory Grove: Charles Moore (R)
- Hudson: Marvin Wilson (R)
- Jackson: Joe Phillips (R)
- Jefferson: Jayson Flud (R)
- Pleasant Hill: Johnny Bohannon (R)
- Richland: Lee Young (R)
- Western Grove: Gary Waters (R)

=== Politics ===
Along with adjacent Searcy County, Newton is unique among Arkansas counties in being traditionally Republican in political leanings even during the overwhelmingly Democratic "Solid South" era. This Republicanism resulted from their historical paucity of slaves, in turn created by infertile soils unsuitable for intensive cotton farming, and produced support for the Union during the Civil War. These were the only two counties in Arkansas to be won by Alf Landon in 1936, Wendell Willkie in 1940, Charles Evans Hughes in 1916, and even Calvin Coolidge in 1924. Since the Civil War the only Democrats to gain an absolute majority of Newton County's vote have been Franklin D. Roosevelt in 1932 and Jimmy Carter in 1976. In 2008, the Socialism and Liberation candidate, Gloria La Riva, had the notable achievement of winning the precinct of Murray, ahead of major party candidates Barack Obama and John McCain. The Republican nominee has received over sixty percent in all Presidential elections from 2000 to 2020 inclusive. In 2016, Newton County voted over 76 percent for Donald Trump, while Hillary Clinton received just 18 percent.

The county is in Arkansas's 1st congressional district, which from Reconstruction until 2010 sent only Democrats to the U.S. House. That year, it elected Republican Rick Crawford, who currently holds the seat as to date. In the Arkansas House of Representatives Newton County is represented by Steven Walker. The state senator, Missy Thomas Irvin, is also a Republican.

United States presidential election results for Newton County, Arkansas
Year	Republican		Democratic		Third party(ies)	
Year	No.	%	No.	%	No.	%
1896	733	52.21%	659	46.94%	12	0.85%
1900	690	60.74%	443	39.00%	3	0.26%
1904	645	68.47%	280	29.72%	17	1.80%
1908	582	58.26%	377	37.74%	40	4.00%
1912	285	34.67%	290	35.28%	247	30.05%
1916	675	55.10%	550	44.90%	0	0.00%
1920	828	60.26%	486	35.37%	60	4.37%
1924	578	61.23%	298	31.57%	68	7.20%
1928	1,316	70.87%	533	28.70%	8	0.43%
1932	540	35.76%	941	62.32%	29	1.92%
1936	1,053	52.89%	938	47.11%	0	0.00%
1940	1,392	53.17%	1,202	45.91%	24	0.92%
1944	934	56.61%	710	43.03%	6	0.36%
1948	879	50.29%	848	48.51%	21	1.20%
1952	1,728	60.89%	1,107	39.01%	3	0.11%
1956	1,481	63.95%	832	35.92%	3	0.13%
1960	1,814	67.51%	844	31.41%	29	1.08%
1964	1,357	49.01%	1,374	49.62%	38	1.37%
1968	1,467	50.83%	852	29.52%	567	19.65%
1972	1,924	69.84%	831	30.16%	0	0.00%
1976	1,611	46.68%	1,840	53.32%	0	0.00%
1980	2,423	60.08%	1,436	35.61%	174	4.31%
1984	2,749	65.88%	1,414	33.88%	10	0.24%
1988	2,504	62.00%	1,489	36.87%	46	1.14%
1992	1,730	41.75%	1,765	42.59%	649	15.66%
1996	1,927	46.39%	1,631	39.26%	596	14.35%
2000	2,529	64.40%	1,205	30.69%	193	4.91%
2004	2,779	63.48%	1,506	34.40%	93	2.12%
2008	2,588	65.35%	1,182	29.85%	190	4.80%
2012	2,508	68.51%	993	27.12%	160	4.37%
2016	2,875	76.61%	699	18.63%	179	4.77%
2020	3,192	79.84%	709	17.73%	97	2.43%
2024	3,063	81.25%	644	17.08%	63	1.67%

== Attractions ==
24 Hours of Horseshoe Hell (24HHH) is an annual rock-climbing competition held at Horseshoe Canyon Ranch in Newton County. Using difficulty ratings based on the Yosemite Decimal System, teams of two attempt to climb as many routes as possible in 24 hours. The sandstone walls of the canyon has over 411 established routes. The event was first held in 2006, and was rated by Climbing magazine as one of the most difficult endurance events in the nation.

== Communities ==
=== City ===
- Jasper (county seat)

=== Town ===
- Western Grove

=== Census-designated place ===
- Deer
- Mount Judea
- Ponca
- Wayton

=== Other unincorporated communities ===
- Bass
- Ben Hur
- Compton
- Dinsmore
- Fallsville
- Hasty
- Marble Falls
- Mossville
- Piercetown
- Parthenon
- Vendor

=== Townships ===
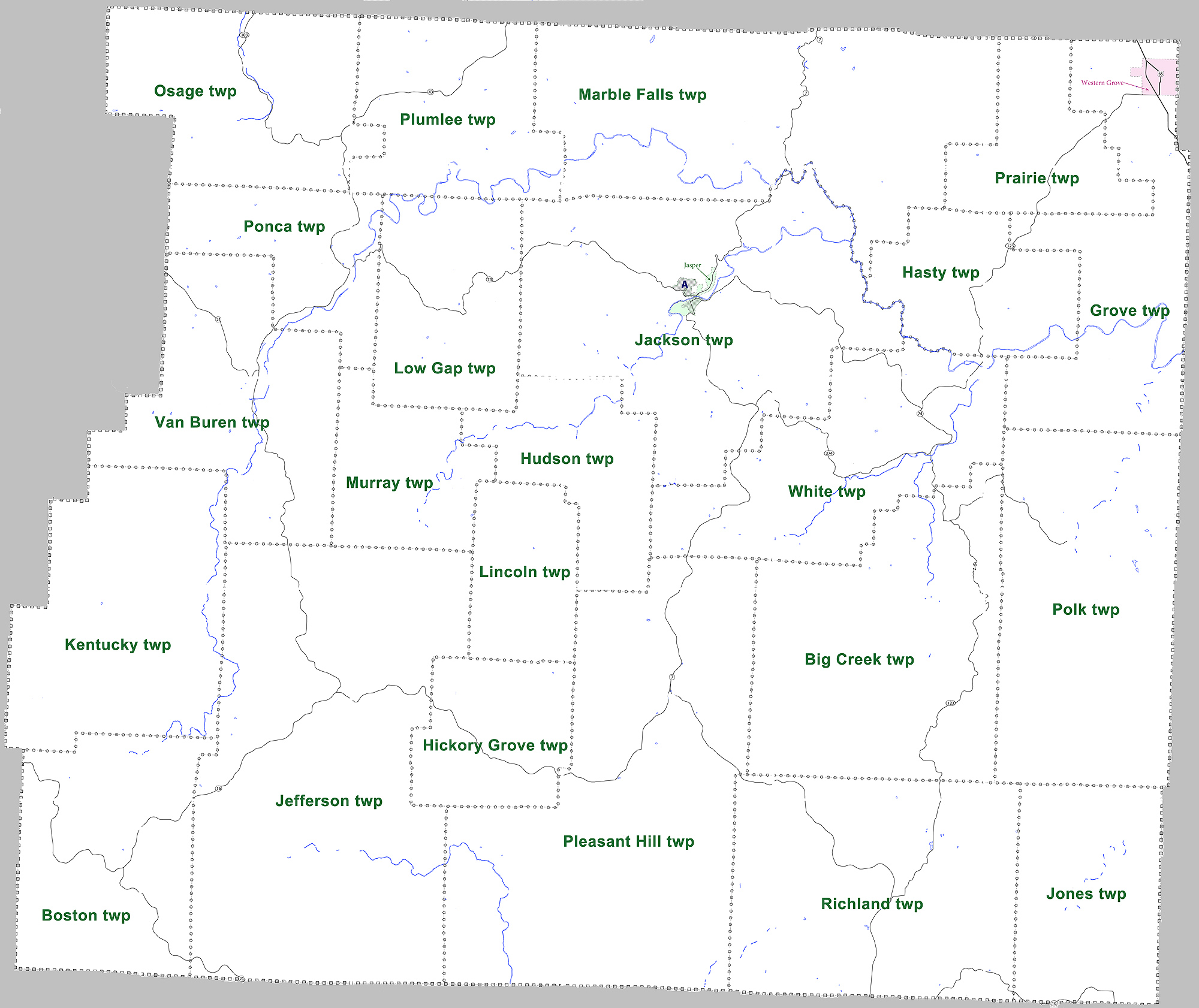
Townships in Newton County, Arkansas as of 2010

Townships in Arkansas are the divisions of a county. Each township includes unincorporated areas; some may have incorporated cities or towns within part of their boundaries. Arkansas townships have limited purposes in modern times. However, the United States census does list Arkansas population based on townships (sometimes referred to as "county subdivisions" or "minor civil divisions"). Townships are also of value for historical purposes in terms of genealogical research. Each town or city is within one or more townships in an Arkansas county based on census maps and publications. The townships of Newton County are listed below; listed in parentheses are the cities, towns, and/or census-designated places that are fully or partially inside the township.

Township	FIPS code	ANSI code (GNIS ID)	Population center(s)	Pop. (2010)	Pop. density (/mi^{2})	Pop. density (/km^{2})	Total area (mi^{2})	Total area (km^{2})	Land area (mi^{2})	Land area (km^{2})	Water area (mi^{2})	Water area (km^{2})	Geographic coordinates
Big Creek	05-90270	00069672		244	4.97	1.92	49.135	127.3	49.084	127.1	0.051	0.1321	35.870031°N 93.078980°W
Boston	05-90417	00069673		65	2.03	0.79	31.965	82.79	31.947	82.74	0.018	0.04662	35.802293°N 93.486503°W
Grove	05-91545	00069674	Western Grove	907	26.04	10.06	34.979	90.60	34.825	90.20	0.154	0.3989	36.037719°N 92.970012°W
Hasty	05-91641	00069675		268	14.09	5.44	19.123	49.53	19.014	49.25	0.109	0.2823	35.999647°N 93.036620°W
Hickory Grove	05-91695	00069676		129	7.60	2.93	16.989	44.00	16.980	43.98	0.009	0.02331	35.839875°N 93.281762°W
Hudson	05-91788	00069677		327	17.33	6.69	18.951	49.08	18.873	48.88	0.078	0.2020	35.936140°N 93.242629°W
Jackson	05-91872	00069678	Jasper	1,620	27.19	10.50	59.933	155.2	59.573	154.3	0.360	0.9324	36.002703°N 93.180608°W
Jefferson	05-91941	00069679		284	3.54	1.37	80.396	208.2	80.312	208.0	0.084	0.2176	35.817879°N 93.379476°W
Jones	05-91995	00069680		29	1.19	0.46	24.429	63.27	24.410	63.22	0.019	0.04921	35.744590°N 92.994921°W
Kentucky	05-92031	00069681		60	1.49	0.58	40.325	104.4	40.222	104.2	0.103	0.2668	35.885138°N 93.442773°W
Lincoln	05-92211	00069682		248	17.32	6.69	14.329	37.11	14.319	37.09	0.010	0.02590	35.886049°N 93.270498°W
Low Gap	05-92295	00069683		268	11.45	4.42	23.487	60.83	23.397	60.60	0.090	0.2331	36.032597°N 93.308932°W
Marble Falls	05-92373	02406958		932	15.86	6.12	59.044	152.9	58.751	152.2	0.293	0.7589	36.078548°N 93.151902°W
Murray	05-92655	00069685		172	10.30	3.98	16.732	43.34	16.696	43.24	0.036	0.09324	35.944909°N 93.327241°W
Osage	05-92772	00069686		238	7.62	2.94	31.285	81.03	31.221	80.86	0.064	0.1658	36.087078°N 93.417719°W
Pleasant Hill	05-92919	00069687		386	5.27	2.04	73.285	189.8	73.176	189.5	0.109	0.2823	35.796427°N 93.228082°W
Plumlee	05-92928	00069688		223	8.71	3.36	25.767	66.74	25.608	66.32	0.159	0.4118	36.079286°N 93.305643°W
Polk	05-92949	00069689		224	4.64	1.79	48.347	125.2	48.295	125.1	0.052	0.1347	35.894152°N 92.990789°W
Ponca	05-92958	00069690		158	8.70	3.36	18.253	47.28	18.155	47.02	0.098	0.2538	36.025099°N 93.380959°W
Prairie	05-93006	00069691		252	14.77	5.70	17.077	44.23	17.064	44.20	0.013	0.03367	36.066934°N 93.023884°W
Richland	05-93150	00069692		281	5.81	2.24	48.386	125.3	48.335	125.2	0.051	0.1321	35.756678°N 93.107967°W
Van Buren	05-93774	00069694		185	5.32	2.05	34.885	90.35	34.764	90.04	0.121	0.3134	35.952003°N 93.422449°W
White	05-93990	00069696		830	23.14	8.93	36.086	93.46	35.876	92.92	0.210	0.5439	35.947124°N 93.106975°W
Source: "Census 2010 U.S. Gazetteer Files: County Subdivisions in Arkansas". U.S. Census Bureau, Geography Division. Archived from the original on May 31, 2014. Source: "Census 2010 U.S. Gazetteer Files". U.S. Census Bureau, Geography Division.

== Infrastructure ==
=== Major highways ===
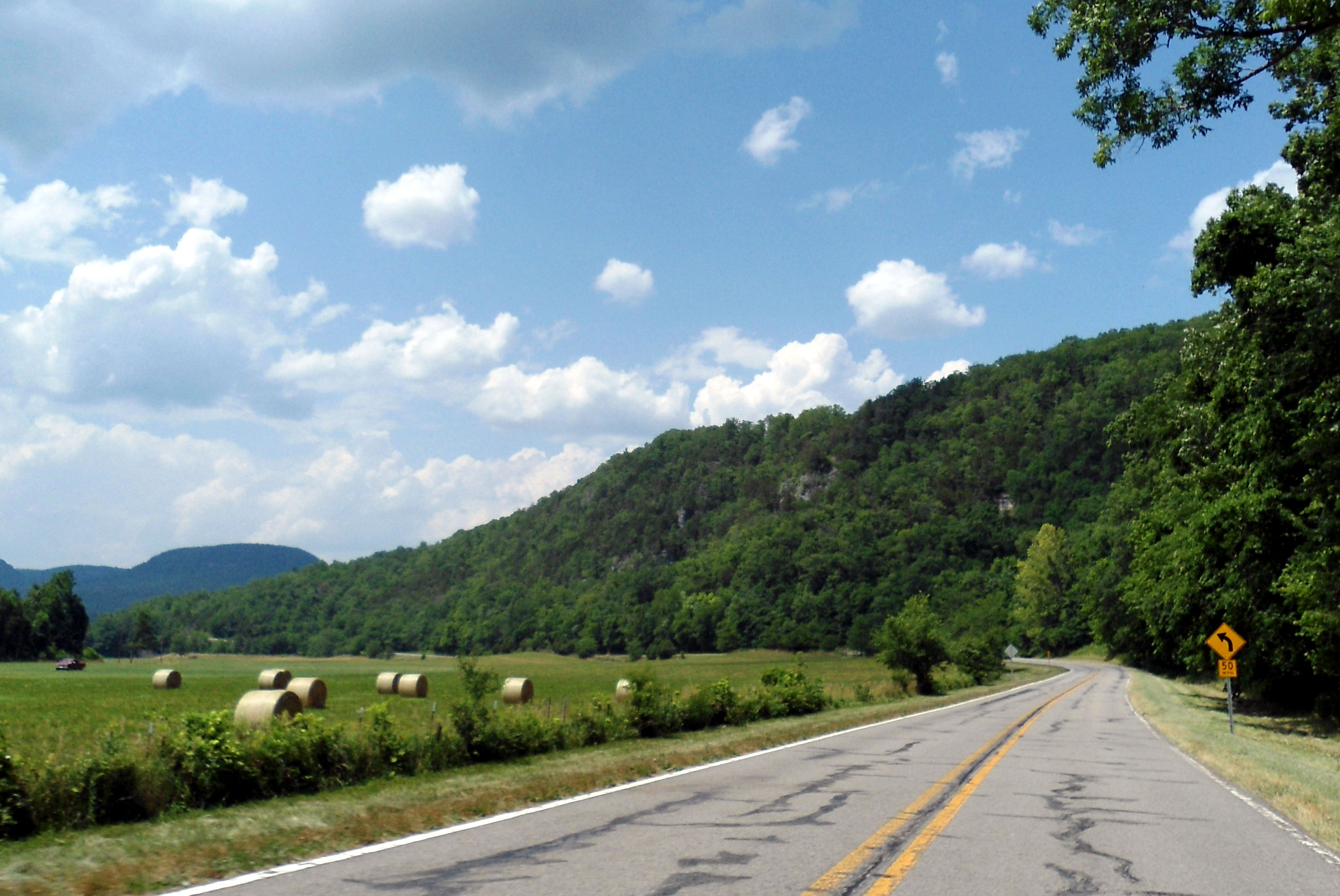
Highway 21 in Boxley Valley in the Upper Buffalo Wilderness

- U.S. Highway 65
- Arkansas Highway 7
- Arkansas Highway 16
- Arkansas Highway 21
- Arkansas Highway 43
- Arkansas Highway 74
- Arkansas Highway 103
- Arkansas Highway 123
- Arkansas Highway 327
- Arkansas Highway 374

== See also ==
- List of lakes in Newton County, Arkansas
- National Register of Historic Places listings in Newton County, Arkansas
