= Arkansas Highway 199 =

State highway in Arkansas, USA

Highway 199

Route information
- Maintained by ArDOT
- Length: 6.79 mi (10.93 km)
- Existed: June 23, 1965–present

Major junctions
- South end: US 425 at Terry
- North end: US 65 at Linwood

Location
- Country: United States
- State: Arkansas
- Counties: Lincoln, Jefferson

Highway system
- Arkansas Highway System; Interstate; US; State; Business; Spurs; Suffixed; Scenic; Heritage
← AR 198	→ AR 200

Highway 199 (AR 199, Ark. 199, and Hwy. 199) is a north–south state highway in Southeast Arkansas. The route begins at US Highway 425 (US 425) at Terry (Note: Two nearby communities, Terry and Tarry, are named similarly. Terry is listed as the southern terminus on the minute order creating the highway. Both are shown on the Lincoln County map.) and runs north 6.79 miles (10.93 km) to US 65 at Linwood. The route is maintained by the Arkansas Department of Transportation (ArDOT).

== Route description ==
Highway 199 begins at US 425 in Southeast Arkansas in the Lower Arkansas Delta near Terry. The area is known for flat, agricultural land with swamps, bayous and small towns dotting the landscape. The route crosses three bayous and passes through the unincorporated community of Moscow before intersecting US 65, where it terminates.

== History ==
The route was designated by the Arkansas State Highway Commission on June 23, 1965. It has not been changed or realigned since creation.

== Major intersections ==
County	Location	mi	km	Destinations	Notes
Lincoln	Terry	0.00	0.00	US 425 – Pine Bluff, Star City	Southern terminus
Jefferson	Linwood	6.79	10.93	US 65 – Grady, Pine Bluff	Northern terminus
1.000 mi = 1.609 km; 1.000 km = 0.621 mi
