= SCSD =

SCSD may refer to:

- Sacramento County Sheriff's Department
- Salton Community Services District, covering Desert Shores, California and Salton City, California
- SCSD (School Construction Systems Development ) project
- Shannon County School District (now Oglala Lakota County School District)
- Simpson County School District
- Smithtown Central School District
- Socorro Consolidated School District
- Southern California School for the Deaf
- Springfield City School District
- Star City School District
- Sunflower County School District
- Syosset Central School District
- Syracuse City School District
