= Cedric Thornton =

American football player (born 1988)

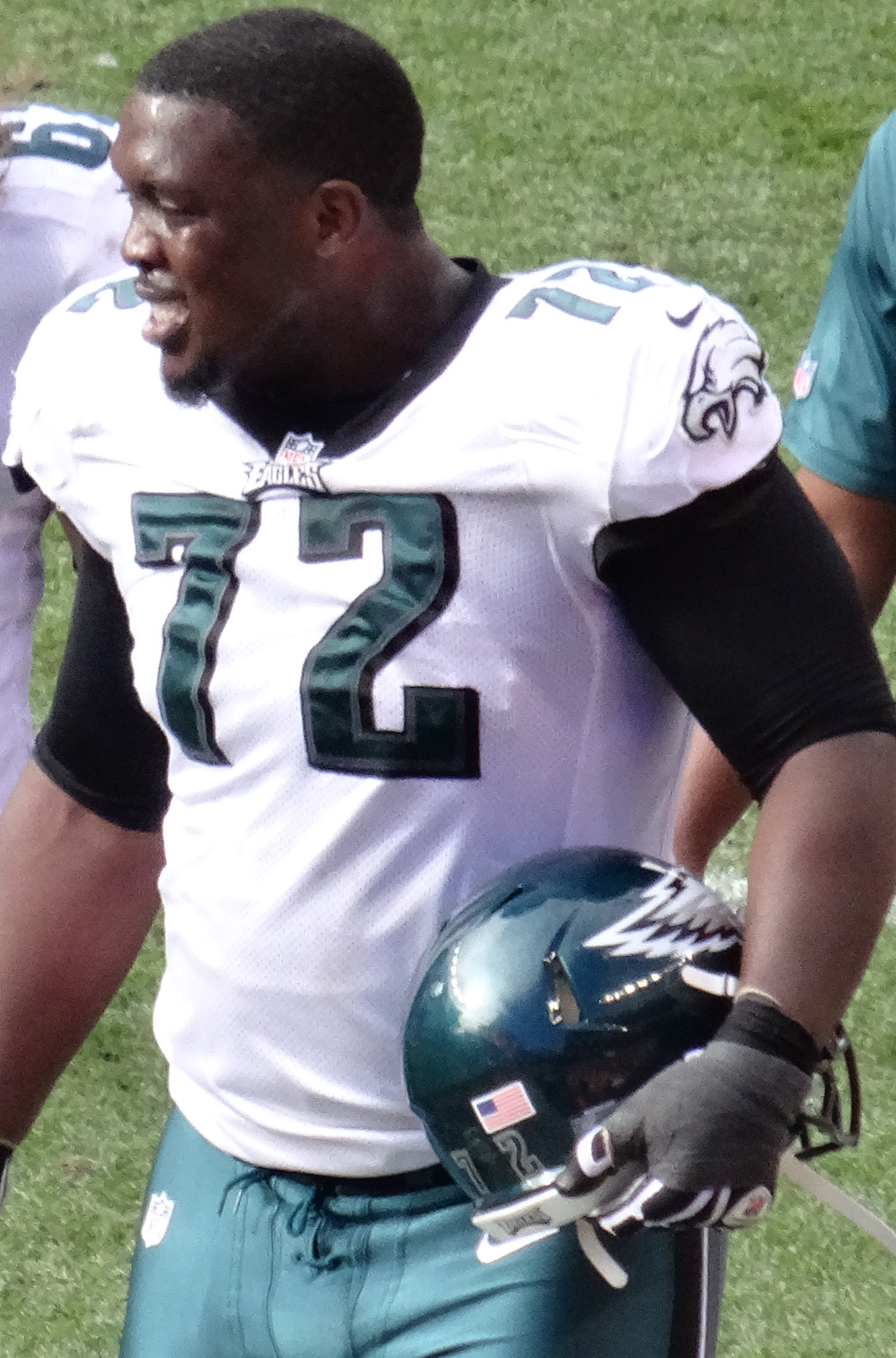
- Thornton with the Eagles in 2013

No. 72, 91, 92
- Position: Defensive tackle

Personal information
- Born: June 21, 1988 (age 38); Star City, Arkansas, U.S.
- Listed height: 6 ft 4 in (1.93 m)
- Listed weight: 290 lb (132 kg)

Career information
- High school: Star City
- College: Southern Arkansas
- NFL draft: 2011: undrafted

Career history
- Philadelphia Eagles (2011–2015); Dallas Cowboys (2016); Buffalo Bills (2017); San Francisco 49ers (2018–2019)*
- * Offseason or practice squad member only

Awards and highlights
- First-team Little All-American (2009); All-GSC (2009)

Career NFL statistics
- Total tackles: 220
- Sacks: 7.5
- Forced fumbles: 2
- Fumble recoveries: 4
- Defensive touchdowns: 1
- Stats at Pro Football Reference

Cedric Thornton (born June 21, 1988) is an American former professional football player who was a defensive tackle in the National Football League (NFL). He played college football for the Southern Arkansas Muleriders and was signed by the Philadelphia Eagles as an undrafted free agent in 2011.

== Early life ==
Thornton attended Star City High School, where he practiced football, baseball and basketball. In football, he played as a running back and wide receiver.

Thornton walked on to Division II Southern Arkansas University to join his brother. He was converted into a defensive end and became a starter as a junior, recording 80 tackles (first on the team), 23 tackles for loss (ranked first in college football), 8.5 sacks, 2 forced fumbles and 2 blocked kicks. The next year, he had 52 tackles (third on the team), 13 tackles for loss, 1.5 sacks, 5 quarterback hurries (led the team) and one forced fumble.

== Professional career ==
=== Philadelphia Eagles ===
Thornton signed by the Philadelphia Eagles as an undrafted free agent following the 2011 NFL draft and NFL lockout. He initially made the 53-man roster after training camp to open the season, but was waived to make room for offensive lineman Kyle DeVan on September 4. He was re-signed to the team's practice squad the next day, where he spent the first thirteen weeks of the season. On December 12, he was promoted to the active roster and was declared inactive for the last three games.

In 2012, Thornton's playing time increased as a backup on the defensive line rotation, while registering 47 tackles, 2 tackles for loss and one sack. His best game came against the Atlanta Falcons, when he had 8 tackles and one sack.

In 2013, he became the starting defensive end in the Eagles 3-4 defense, posting 78 tackles, 5 tackles for loss (third on the team) and one sack. The next year, he missed 3 games with a hand injury, but still had 61 tackles, 3 tackles for loss, one sack and 3 fumble recoveries.

=== Dallas Cowboys ===
On March 10, 2016, Thornton signed a four-year contract with the Dallas Cowboys worth more than $18 million and $6 million guaranteed, with the intention of moving him from defensive end to defensive tackle.

His season was seen as something of a disappointment, because he couldn't supplant Terrell McClain or rookie Maliek Collins in the starting lineup and was relegated to a backup role as part of the defensive tackle rotation. He missed the last 3 games against the Tampa Bay Buccaneers, Detroit Lions and Philadelphia Eagles with a high ankle sprain. He finished with 22 tackles, 1.5 sacks, one forced fumble and a fumble recovery.

After undergoing offseason shoulder surgery, he entered the 2017 organized team activities as the leading candidate to replace McClain, who had left in free agency. He injured his hamstring after being off to a good start, which forced him to miss several weeks of training camp. He was eventually passed on the depth chart by free agent acquisition Stephen Paea. Although his $3 million base salary was guaranteed for the season, the Cowboys released him on September 3, after claiming defensive tackle Brian Price off waivers.

=== Buffalo Bills ===
On September 5, 2017, Thornton signed with the Buffalo Bills. He appeared in 15 games with 3 starts.

=== San Francisco 49ers ===
On July 25, 2018, Thornton signed with the San Francisco 49ers.

On August 22, 2018, Thornton announced his retirement from the NFL after six seasons.

On April 15, 2019, Thornton came out of retirement after sitting out 2018, and was added to the 49ers active roster. He was released on July 26, 2019.

== NFL career statistics ==
Legend
	Led the league
**Bold**	Career high

=== Regular season ===
Year	Team	Games		Tackles					Interceptions					Fumbles			
Year	Team	GP	GS	Cmb	Solo	Ast	Sck	TFL	Int	Yds	TD	Lng	PD	FF	FR	Yds	TD
2012	PHI	**16**	0	27	19	8	1.0	4	0	0	0	0	0	0	0	0	0
2013	PHI	**16**	**16**	**60**	**48**	12	1.0	**7**	0	0	0	0	**2**	**1**	0	0	0
2014	PHI	**16**	**16**	51	35	**16**	1.0	5	0	0	0	0	**2**	0	**3**	**40**	**1**
2015	PHI	13	13	33	17	**16**	1.0	4	0	0	0	0	1	0	0	0	0
2016	DAL	13	0	22	12	10	1.5	4	0	0	0	0	1	**1**	1	1	0
2017	BUF	15	3	27	18	9	**2.0**	5	0	0	0	0	0	0	0	0	0
		89	48	220	149	71	7.5	29	0	0	0	0	6	2	4	41	1

=== Playoffs ===
Year	Team	Games		Tackles					Interceptions					Fumbles			
Year	Team	GP	GS	Cmb	Solo	Ast	Sck	TFL	Int	Yds	TD	Lng	PD	FF	FR	Yds	TD
2013	PHI	**1**	**1**	**2**	**2**	0	0.0	0	0	0	0	0	0	0	0	0	0
2016	DAL	**1**	0	0	0	0	0.0	0	0	0	0	0	0	0	0	0	0
2017	BUF	**1**	0	0	0	0	0.0	0	0	0	0	0	0	0	0	0	0
		3	1	2	2	0	0.0	0	0	0	0	0	0	0	0	0	0

== Personal life ==
Thornton now coaches elementary and secondary basketball and football teams in the DFW area.
