= Cynthia Neeley =

American politician

Member of the Michigan House of Representatives
- Incumbent
- Assumed office March 17, 2020
- Preceded by: Sheldon Neeley
- Constituency: 34th district (2020–2023); 70th district (2023–present)

Personal details
- Party: Democratic
- Spouse: Sheldon Neeley
- Children: 2
- Education: Star City High School; Mott Community College

Cynthia Renay Neeley is an American politician serving in the Michigan House of Representatives for the 70th district. She is married to Flint mayor Sheldon Neeley.

== Education ==
Neeley graduated from Star City High School in Star City, Arkansas. Neeley later earned her certification in cosmetology from Mott Community College.

== Career ==
On March 10, 2020, Neeley was elected to the Michigan House of Representatives where she represents the 34th district. Neeley assumed office on March 17, 2020. Neeley is a Democrat. On March 8, 2020, Neeley announced her endorsement of Joe Biden in the 2020 United States presidential election. On August 5, 2020, Neeley won the primary election for re-election to the state house.

Following redistricting, Neeley ran in the 70th district in 2022, winning reelection. She was reelected in 2024.

== Personal life ==
Neeley resides in Flint, Michigan. Neeley is married to her predecessor in the state house and mayor of Flint, Sheldon Neeley. Together, they have two children.
