= SDLC =

SDLC may refer to:

- Software development life cycle, describes the life cycle of developing a software system
- System design life cycle, an uncommon term related to systems development life cycle
- Systems development life cycle, describes the life cycle of developing a computer-based system
- Synchronous Data Link Control, an IBM communications protocol
