= Star City High School =

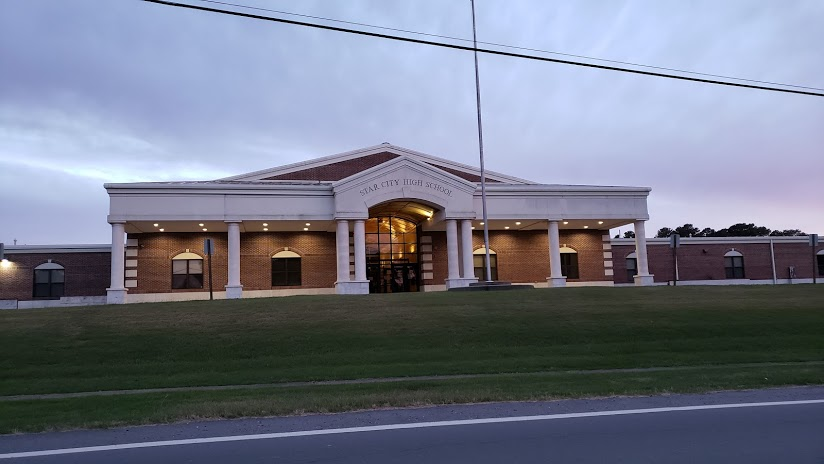

Location
- 400 East Arkansas Avenue; Star City, Lincoln County, Arkansas 71667; United States
- Coordinates: 33°56′27″N 91°50′29″W

Information
- School type: Public
- School district: Star City School District
- Superintendent: Jordan Frizzell
- CEEB code: 042337
- NCES School ID: 050004201281
- Principal: Lezeme Winn
- Teaching staff: 33.60 (FTE)
- Grades: 9–12
- Enrollment: 416 (2023-2024)
- Student to teacher ratio: 12.38
- Education system: ADE Smart Core
- Classes offered: Regular, Advanced Placement (AP), Environmental and Spatial Technology (EAST), Project Lead The Way (PLTW)
- Colors: Blue and white
- Athletics conference: 4A Region 8
- Mascot: Bulldog
- Team name: Star City Bulldogs
- Accreditation: ADE
- Feeder to: Star City Middle School
- Affiliation: Arkansas Activities Association
- Website: www.starcityschools.com/page/star-city-high-school

Star City High School is a comprehensive public high school for students in grades 9 through 12 located in Star City, Arkansas, United States. Star City High School is the only public high school in Lincoln County and the only high school of the Star City School District.

It serves Star City and Grady as well as multiple unincorporated areas.

== History ==
In 2004 the Arkansas Legislature approved a law that forced school districts with fewer than 350 students apiece to consolidate with other districts. In May 2004 the Arkansas Board of Education voted unanimously to merge the Grady School District into the Star City district. On July 1, 2004, the Grady School District was merged into the Star City district. The former Grady district operated Grady High School when it existed. As a result of the 2004 merger, Grady High had consolidated into Star City High.

== Academics ==
The assumed course of study follows the Smart Core curriculum developed by the Arkansas Department of Education (ADE), which requires students complete at least 23 units prior to graduation. Students complete regular coursework and exams and may take Advanced Placement (AP) courses and exams with the opportunity to receive college credit.

The faculty includes art teacher Roger Darren High who was named Secondary Art Teacher of the Year by the Arkansas Art Educators.

== Athletics ==
The Star City High School athletic emblem (mascot) is the Bulldog with blue and white serving as the school colors.

The Star City Bulldogs compete in interscholastic activities within the 4A Classification administered by the Arkansas Activities Association. The Bulldogs play within the 4A Region 8 Conference. Star City participates in football, golf (boys/girls), basketball (boys/girls), cross country (boys/girls), cheer, soccer (boys/girls), baseball, fastpitch softball, tennis (boys/girls), track and field (boys/girls).

== Notable alumni ==
- Cedric Thornton – NFL football player for the Philadelphia Eagles and Dallas Cowboys
- Jared Blake - Country musician famous for appearing on the 1st season of the hit TV series The Voice and signing a recording contract in Nashville where he currently resides.
- Cynthia Neeley - politician who is currently serving in the Michigan House of Representatives
