= Systems analysis and design =

Systems analysis and design (SAD) may refer to:

- Systems analysis, studying a system by examining its components and their interactions
  - Structured data analysis (systems analysis), analyzing the flow of information within an organization with data-flow diagrams
- Systems design, the process of designing a system to satisfy requirements
- Object-oriented analysis and design, an approach to system analysis and design that emphasizes object-based modularity and visual modeling
- Service-oriented analysis and design, an approach to service-oriented modeling to design business systems
- Structured analysis, an approach to system analysis that emphasizes functionality decomposition
- Structured systems analysis and design method, a formal methodology for analyzing and designing information systems.

== See also ==
- Structured data analysis (disambiguation)
- Systems thinking, examining complex systems as a whole
