= Lincoln County, Arkansas =

County in Arkansas, United States

- County
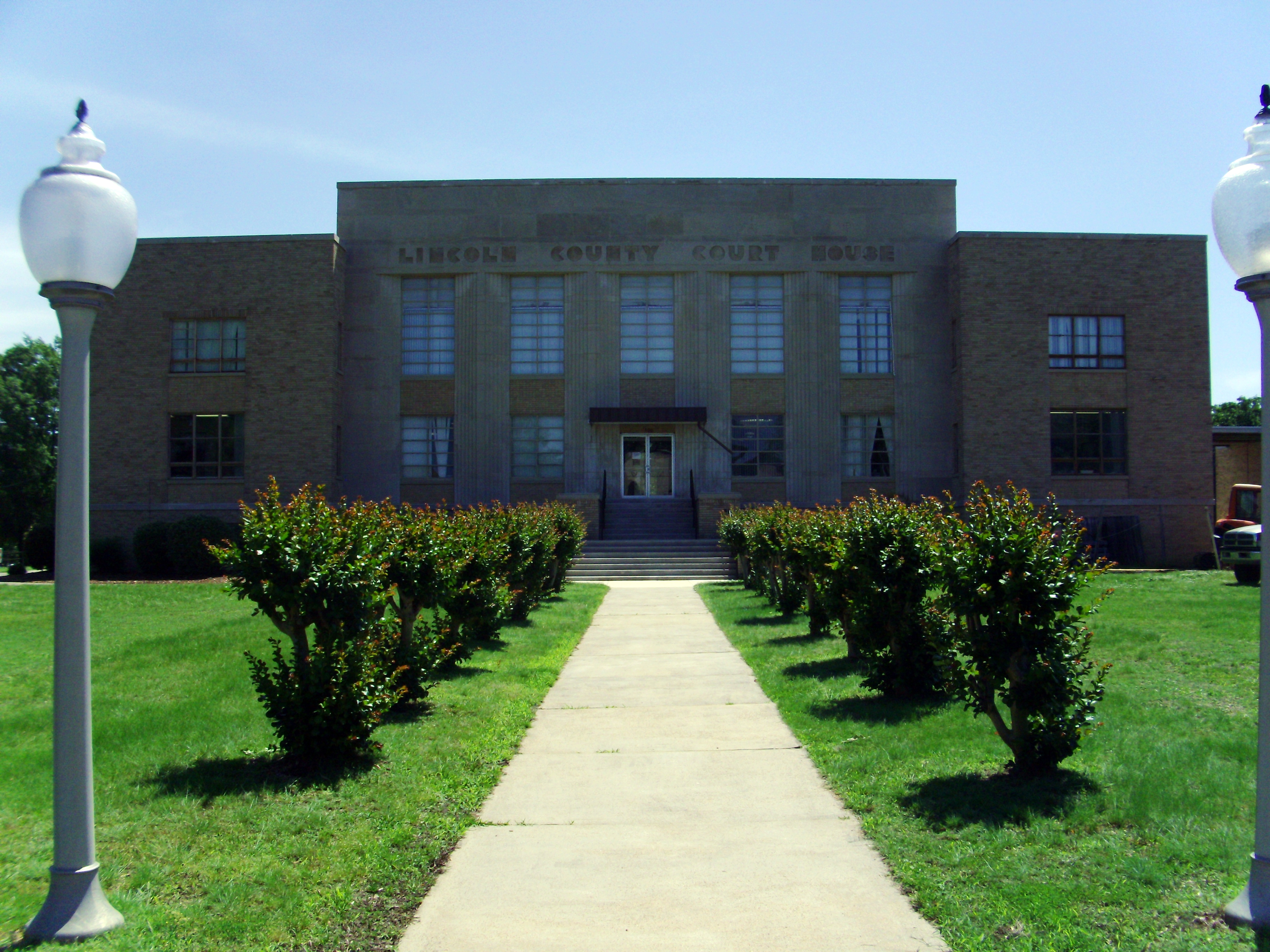
- Lincoln County Courthouse in Star City

- Location within the U.S. state of Arkansas
- Coordinates: 33°57′35″N 91°43′07″W
- Country: United States
- State: Arkansas
- Founded: March 28, 1871
- Named for: Abraham Lincoln
- Seat: Star City
- Largest city: Star City

Area
  - Total: 572.17 sq mi (1,481.9 km^{2})
  - Land: 561.20 sq mi (1,453.5 km^{2})
  - Water: 10.97 sq mi (28.4 km^{2}) 1.9%

Population (2020)
  - Total: 12,941
  - Estimate (2025): 12,764 ▼
  - Density: 23.060/sq mi (8.9033/km^{2})
- Time zone: UTC−6 (Central)
  - Summer (DST): UTC−5 (CDT)
- Congressional district: 1st
- Website: lincolncounty.arkansas.gov

Lincoln County is located between the Arkansas Timberlands and Arkansas Delta in the U.S. state of Arkansas. It is situated just outside the outer edge of the Central Arkansas metropolitan region. The county is named for President Abraham Lincoln. Created as Arkansas's 65th county on March 28, 1871, Lincoln County has three incorporated cities, including Star City, the county seat and most populous city. The county contains 46 unincorporated communities and ghost towns, Cane Creek State Park at the confluence of Cane Creek and Bayou Bartholomew, and nine listings on the National Register of Historic Places to preserve the history and culture of the county.

Lincoln County occupies 572.17 square miles (148,190 ha) and contained a population of 12,941 as of the 2020 Census. The rural economy is largely based on agriculture. The state has built two prisons here that also provide some local jobs. Poverty and unemployment rates are above national averages, but steady. Household incomes are below state and national averages.

Lincoln County is served by two school districts, Star City School District and Dumas Public Schools. Higher education and healthcare are available in Pine Bluff to the north or Monticello to the south. Although no Interstate highways serve Lincoln County, the county has access to two United States highways (U.S. Route 65 [US 65], US 425) and eight Arkansas state highways. Lincoln County is also served by one public owned/public use general aviation airport, Star City Municipal Airport, and six community water systems provide potable water to customers in the county.

== History ==
The county was established in 1871 during the Reconstruction era by the Arkansas General Assembly from parts of Arkansas, Bradley, Desha, Drew, and Jefferson counties. It was named for President Abraham Lincoln. The Republican Party was chosen by most freedmen after they got the franchise, as it was the one that secured their emancipation after the Civil War. Some white Union sympathizers, including veterans who decided to stay in the South, also voted for Republican candidates, and some were elected to state offices in former Confederate states.

County government was first permanently established in Star City. The county had a second county seat at Varner from 1885 to 1912.

== Geography ==
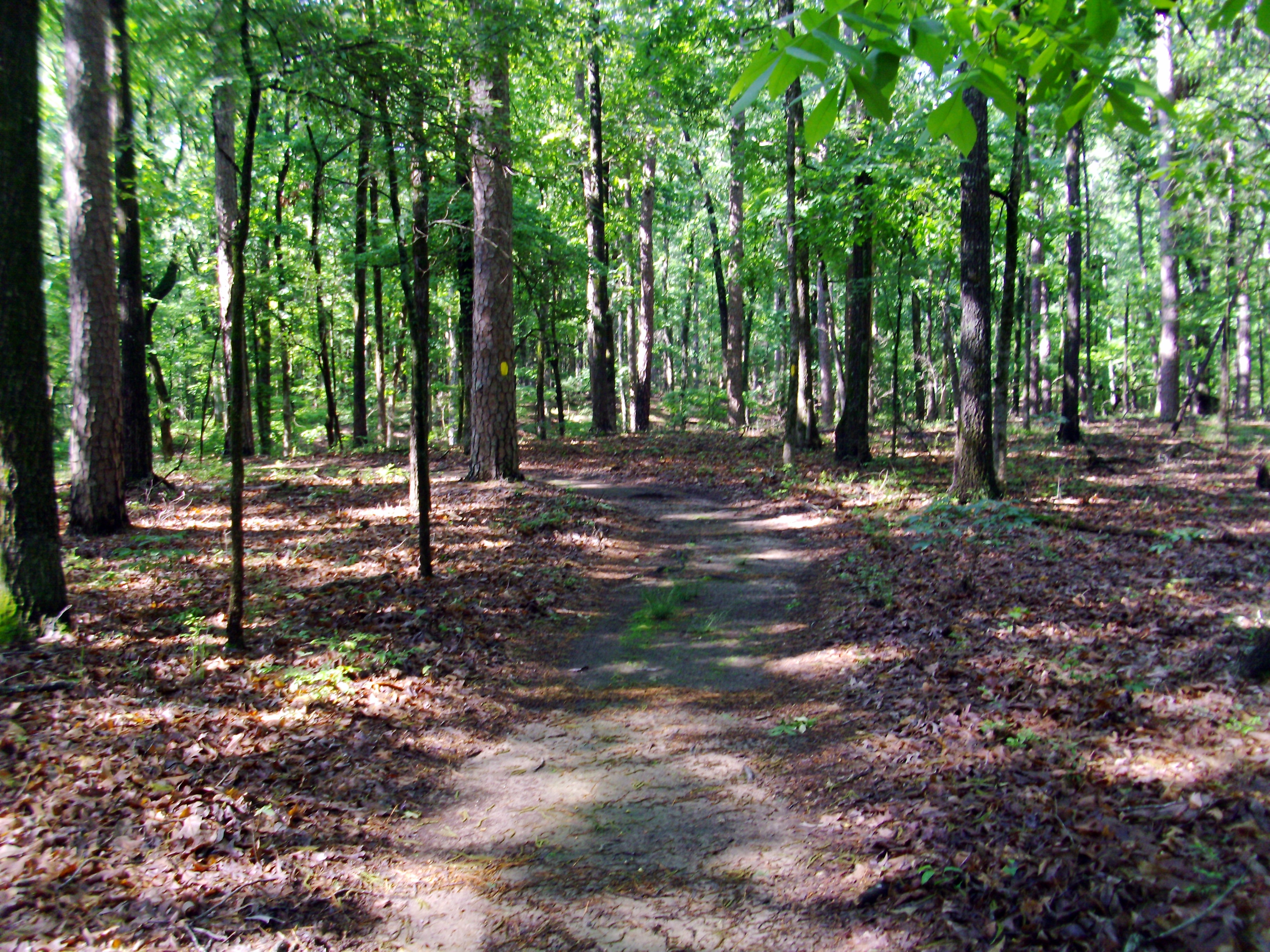
Forested trail typical of western Lincoln County

Lincoln County's geography is defined by two physiographic regions of Arkansas: the Arkansas Timberlands and the Arkansas Delta (in Arkansas, usually referred to as "the Delta"). These two regions are separated by Bayou Bartholomew, the world's longest bayou, which approximately splits the county into eastern and western halves with significant differences in geography. In the east, the Arkansas Delta is a subregion of the Mississippi Alluvial Plain, which is a flat area consisting of rich, fertile sediment deposits from the Mississippi River between Louisiana and Illinois. The western half is part of the Arkansas Timberlands, a portion of the Gulf Coastal Plain characterized by flat pine and cypress forests and silviculture rather than row agriculture. The county is the eighth-smallest in Arkansas, with a total area of 572.17 square miles (1,481.9 km^{2}), of which 561.20 square miles (1,453.5 km^{2}) is land and 10.97 square miles (28.4 km^{2}) (1.9%) is water.

The county is located approximately 68 miles (109 km) southeast of Little Rock, 170 miles (270 km) southwest of Memphis, Tennessee, and 200 miles (320 km) northwest of Jackson, Mississippi. (Note: Mileages from Lincoln County to Little Rock, Memphis, and Jackson are based on highway miles using county seat Star City for Lincoln County.) Lincoln County is surrounded by two Delta counties to the east, Arkansas County and Desha County, and a Timberlands county to the west, Cleveland County. Jefferson County to the north and Drew County are border counties similar to Lincoln County, with Bayou Bartholomew delineating a similarly split geography.

=== Protected areas ===
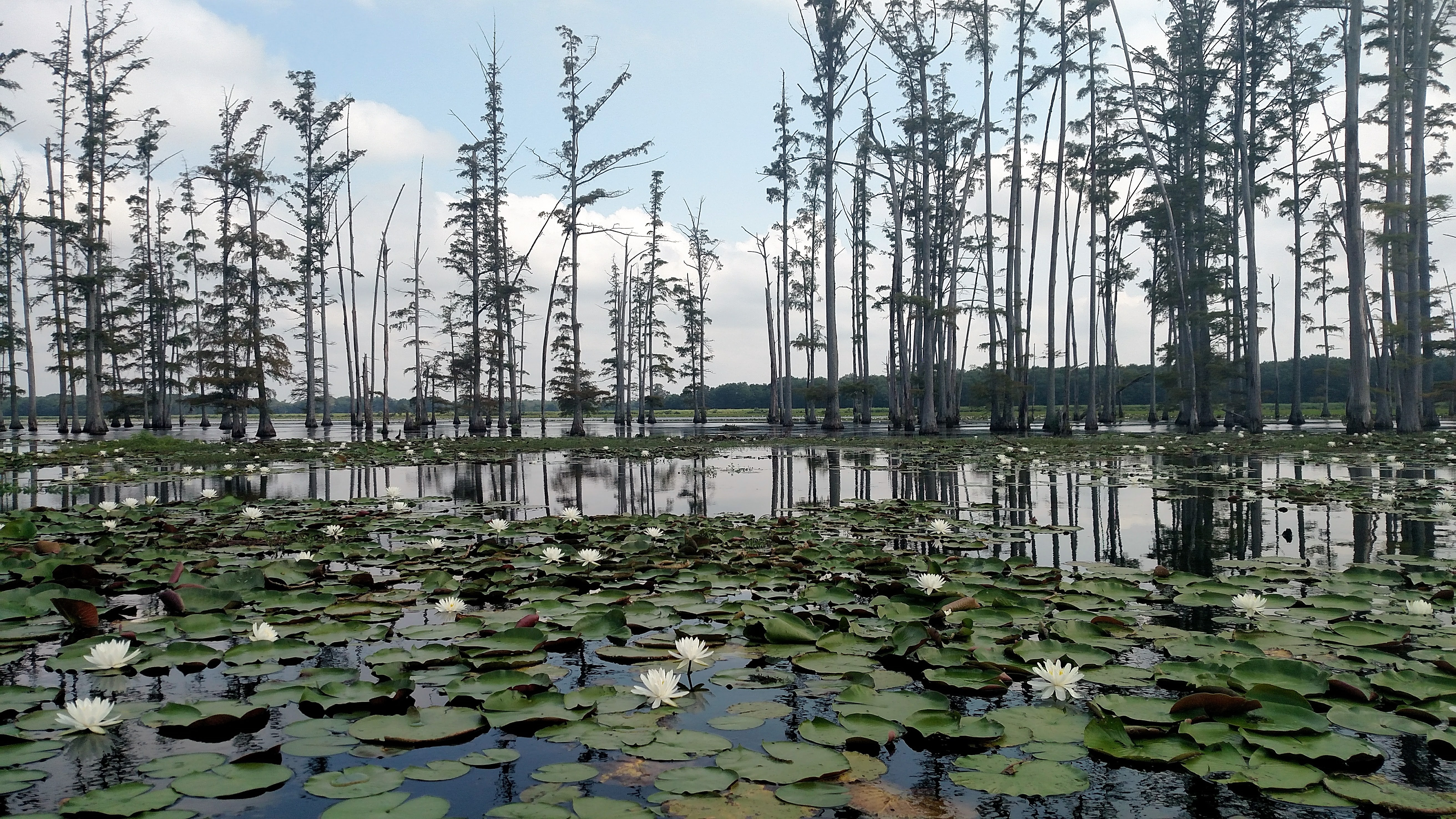
Lily pads and a cypress grove on the lake in Cane Creek State Park

Lincoln County contains two protected areas. Cane Creek State Park is a 2,053-acre (831-hectare) state park located on the border between the West Gulf Coastal Plain and Arkansas Delta, with a 1,675 acres (678 hectares) lake at the center. Fishing, canoeing, and kayaking are available on the lake in addition to pavilions, trails, and a visitor center with gift shop on land. The park offers 29 RV/tent camping sites with water and electric hookups, and is owned and operated by the Arkansas Department of Parks and Tourism.

Huff's Island Public Use Area is located on the Arkansas River in northeastern Lincoln County. Managed by the United States Army Corps of Engineers, the park does not have a boat ramp or camping, but offers day use, river bank access from March–September, and four picnic sites.

== Demographics ==
Historical population
Census	Pop.	Note	%±
1880	9,255		—
1890	10,255		10.8%
1900	13,389		30.6%
1910	15,118		12.9%
1920	18,774		24.2%
1930	20,250		7.9%
1940	19,709		−2.7%
1950	17,079		−13.3%
1960	14,447		−15.4%
1970	12,913		−10.6%
1980	13,369		3.5%
1990	13,690		2.4%
2000	14,492		5.9%
2010	14,134		−2.5%
2020	12,941		−8.4%
2025 (est.)	12,764	▼	−1.4%
U.S. Decennial Census; 1790–1960 1900–1990; 1990–2000 2010

=== 2020 census ===
As of the 2020 census, the county had a population of 12,941. The median age was 40.4 years. 16.1% of residents were under the age of 18 and 15.8% of residents were 65 years of age or older. For every 100 females there were 167.2 males, and for every 100 females age 18 and over there were 187.6 males age 18 and over.

The racial makeup of the county was 64.3% White, 28.2% Black or African American, 0.3% American Indian and Alaska Native, 0.2% Asian, 0.1% Native Hawaiian and Pacific Islander, 3.0% from some other race, and 3.9% from two or more races. Hispanic or Latino residents of any race comprised 4.8% of the population.

<0.1% of residents lived in urban areas, while 100.0% lived in rural areas.

There were 3,807 households in the county, of which 29.6% had children under the age of 18 living in them. Of all households, 47.0% were married-couple households, 19.5% were households with a male householder and no spouse or partner present, and 28.2% were households with a female householder and no spouse or partner present. About 29.7% of all households were made up of individuals and 13.4% had someone living alone who was 65 years of age or older.

There were 4,366 housing units, of which 12.8% were vacant. Among occupied housing units, 75.3% were owner-occupied and 24.7% were renter-occupied. The homeowner vacancy rate was 1.9% and the rental vacancy rate was 7.2%.

=== 2000 census ===
As of the 2000 census, there were 14,492 people, 4,265 households, and 3,130 families residing in the county. The population density was 26 inhabitants per square mile (10/km^{2}). There were 4,955 housing units at an average density of 9 per square mile (3.5/km^{2}). The racial makeup of the county was 64.88% White, 32.92% Black or African American, 0.40% Native American, 0.06% Asian, 0.01% Pacific Islander, 0.99% from other races, and 0.75% from two or more races. 1.81% of the population were Hispanic or Latino of any race.

There were 4,265 households, out of which 34.80% had children under the age of 18 living with them, 54.30% were married couples living together, 14.80% had a female householder with no husband present, and 26.60% were non-families. 23.50% of all households were made up of individuals, and 10.60% had someone living alone who was 65 years of age or older. The average household size was 2.63 and the average family size was 3.11.

In the county, the population was spread out, with 22.20% under the age of 18, 12.40% from 18 to 24, 33.20% from 25 to 44, 20.40% from 45 to 64, and 11.90% who were 65 years of age or older. The median age was 35 years. For every 100 females, there were 142.30 males. For every 100 females age 18 and over, there were 154.70 males.

The median income for a household in the county was $29,607, and the median income for a family was $35,408. Males had a median income of $28,890 versus $19,990 for females. The per capita income for the county was $12,479. About 15.50% of families and 19.50% of the population were below the poverty line, including 26.60% of those under age 18 and 17.90% of those age 65 or over.

== Economy ==
The Arkansas Department of Correction, which operates the Cummins Unit and the Varner Unit in Lincoln County, is one of the county's major employers. (Note: "The Arkansas Department of Correction is one of the major employers in Lincoln County, with the Cummins and Varner units both located outside of Grady.")

== Human resources ==
=== Education ===
Educational attainment in Lincoln County is typical for a rural Arkansas county, with a 2012 study finding 78.4% of Lincoln County residents over age 25 held a high school degree or higher and 8.9% holding a bachelor's degree or higher. The Lincoln County rates are below Arkansas averages of 84.8% and 21.1%, and significantly below national averages of 86.7% and 29.8%, respectively.

==== Primary and secondary education ====
One public school district is based in Lincoln County; the Star City School District, which serves the western two-thirds of the county. The remainder of the county is served by the Dumas Public School District, based in Dumas. Successful completion of the curriculum of these schools leads to graduation from Star City High School or Dumas New Tech High School, respectively. Both high schools offer Advanced Placement (AP) courses and are accredited by the Arkansas Department of Education (ADE). Dumas Public Schools is also accredited by AdvancED.

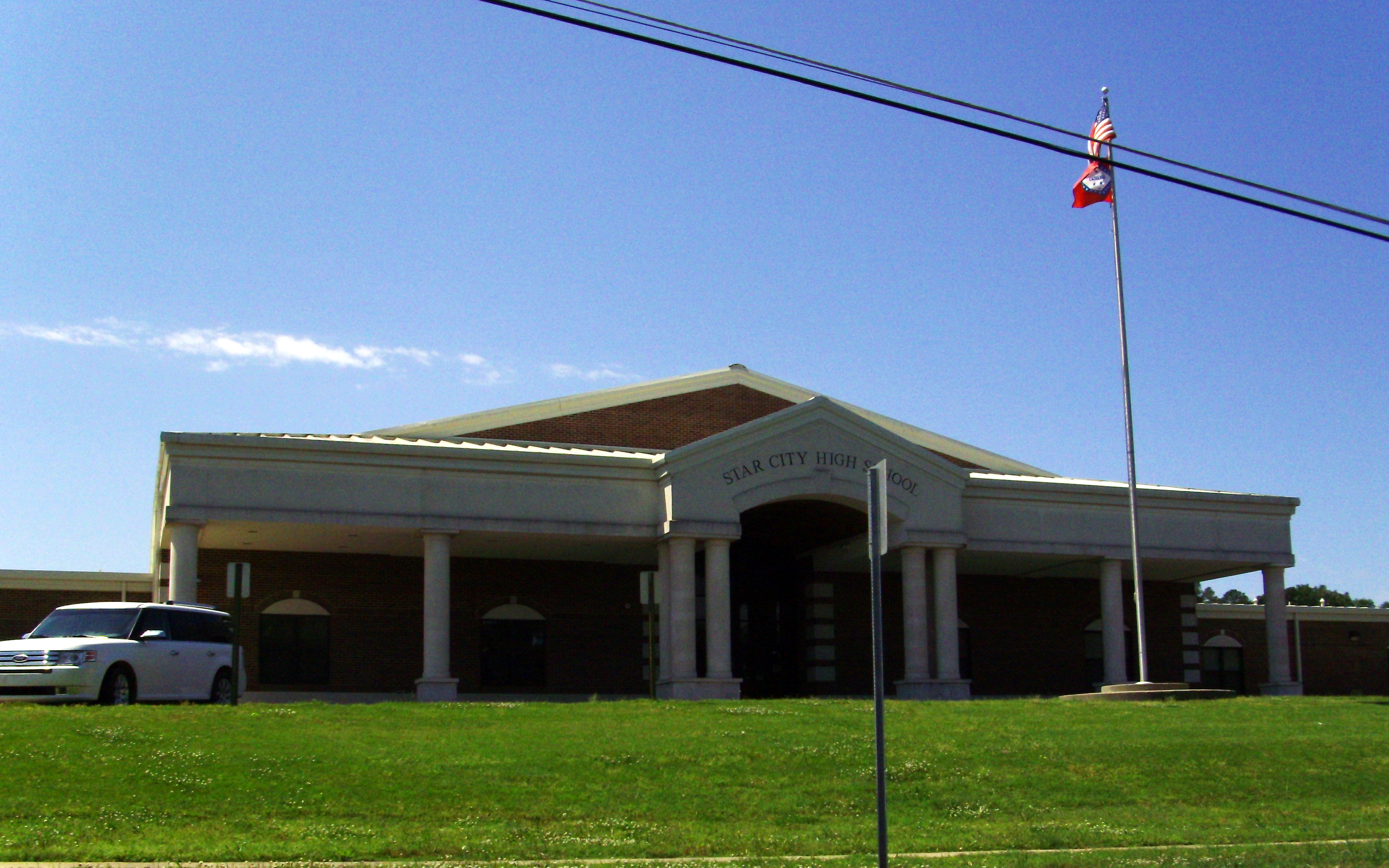
Star City High School

The school districts at Gould and Grady were merged into Dumas and Star City for the 2004–05 school year pursuant to the Public Education Reorganization Act (Note: Act 60 of the Second Extraordinary Session of 2003.) passed by the Arkansas Legislature.

==== Higher education ====
Lincoln County does not contain any institutions of higher education. The three nearest institutions in the region are University of Arkansas at Monticello to the south and Southeast Arkansas College (SEARK) and University of Arkansas at Pine Bluff in Pine Bluff to the north, all public four-year colleges.

==== Library system ====
The Star City Branch Library in downtown Star City is a member library of the Southeast Arkansas Regional Library system. The location offers books, e-books, media, reference, youth, business and genealogy services.

=== Public health ===
Lincoln County's above-average poverty rate (Note: Lincoln County's poverty rate was 32.9%, comparing to 22.4% for Arkansas's rural areas, and a 19.6% statewide average.) suggests a high Medicaid eligibility rate. As of 2012, 25.6% of Lincoln County was eligible for Medicaid, with 62.8% of children under 19 eligible for ARKids First, a program by the Arkansas Department of Human Services that combines children's Medicaid (ARKids A) and other programs for families with higher incomes (ARKids B). These values are more in line with statewide averages (Note: Statewide averages were 27.8% and 59.1% for Medicaid eligibility and ARKids eligibility, respectively.) than typical values for rural Arkansas counties. (Note: Arkansas rural county averages were 31.3% and 66.3% for Medicaid eligibility and ARKids eligibility, respectively.)

The county's population is significantly above healthy weight, with 69.8% of adults and 43.5% of children/adolescents ranking as overweight or obese, above the state averages of 67.1% and 39.3%, themselves significantly above national averages of 62.9% and 30.3%, respectively.

The Jefferson Regional Medical Center in Pine Bluff is a community hospital offering acute inpatient care, emergency care, cardiology, home health, inpatient hospice, neurology, surgery, and the UAMS South Central Family Residency Program. The facility is rated as a Level 4 Trauma Center by the Arkansas Department of Health. Baptist Health Medical Center and CHI St. Vincent Infirmary are referral hospitals in Little Rock. The nearest Level 1 Trauma Centers are Arkansas Children's Hospital (ACH, or "Children's") and University of Arkansas for Medical Sciences (UAMS), both in Little Rock.

=== Public safety ===
The Lincoln County Sheriff's Office is the primary law enforcement agency in the county. The agency is led by the Lincoln County Sheriff, an official elected by countywide vote every four years.

The county is under the jurisdiction of the Lincoln County District Court, a state district court. State district courts in Arkansas are courts of original jurisdiction for criminal, civil (up to $25,000), small claims, and traffic matters. State district courts are presided over by a full-time District Judge elected to a four-year term by a districtwide election. The district is subdivided into the Star City (city), Star City (county), Gould, and Grady departments. All departments of Lincoln County District Court are located at 300 South Drew, and are presided over by one District Judge, who is elected in a countywide election. Superseding district court jurisdiction is the 11th West Judicial Circuit Court, which covers Jefferson and Lincoln counties. The 11th West Circuit contains six circuit judges, elected to six-year terms circuitwide.

==== State prisons ====
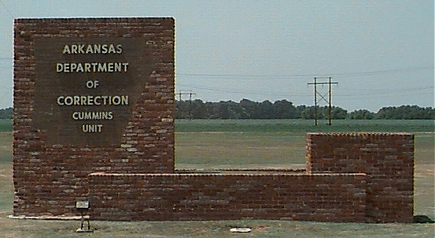
The Cummins Unit is one of two prison units in Lincoln County

The Arkansas Department of Correction operates two prisons in unincorporated areas in the county. The Varner Unit is located in Varner, and the Cummins Unit is near Varner.

== Government ==
The county government is a constitutional body granted specific powers by the Constitution of Arkansas and the Arkansas Code. The quorum court is the legislative branch of the county government and controls all spending and revenue collection. Representatives are called justices of the peace and are elected from county districts every even-numbered year. The number of districts in a county vary from nine to fifteen, and district boundaries are drawn by the county election commission. The Lincoln County Quorum Court has nine members. Presiding over quorum court meetings is the county judge, who serves as the chief operating officer of the county. The county judge is elected at-large and does not vote in quorum court business, although capable of vetoing quorum court decisions.

Lincoln County, Arkansas Elected countywide officials
Position	Officeholder	Party
County Judge	Buddy Lynn Earnest	Republican
County Clerk	Stephanie James	Republican
Circuit Clerk	Cindy Glover	Independent
Sheriff	Steve Young	Republican
Treasurer	Lisa McGehee	Independent
Collector	Melissa Bumpass	Independent
Assessor	Amy Harrison	Independent
Coroner	Matthew Padgett	Republican

The composition of the Quorum Court following the 2024 elections is 4 Republicans, 3 Democrats, and 2 Independents. Justices of the Peace (members) of the Quorum Court following the elections are:

- District 1: Kip Dutton (D)
- District 2: Corey Dial (R)
- District 3: Brad Henley (R)
- District 4: Jeffery L. Frizzell (R)
- District 5: Drew I. Steed (I)
- District 6: Edwin Branson (D)
- District 7: Phillip Thomas (D)
- District 8: Bill Dowdy (R)
- District 9: Jax Gasaway (I)

Additionally, the townships of Lincoln County are entitled to elect their own respective constables, as set forth by the Constitution of Arkansas. Constables are largely of historical significance as they were used to keep the peace in rural areas when travel was more difficult. The township constables as of the 2024 elections are:

- Wells Bayou: Jeff Branson (D)

=== Politics ===
Lincoln County historically followed the Solid South voting trend of strong support for Democrats. However, following the election of Arkansas Governor Bill Clinton, the county has turned increasingly Republican, including in state and local races. Politically, the white-majority Lincoln County has transitioned from reliably Democratic in presidential elections to steadily Republican since the election of Barack Obama.

United States presidential election results for Lincoln County, Arkansas
Year	Republican		Democratic		Third party(ies)	
Year	No.	%	No.	%	No.	%
1896	236	18.66%	1,026	81.11%	3	0.24%
1900	392	32.64%	794	66.11%	15	1.25%
1904	352	37.81%	544	58.43%	35	3.76%
1908	159	27.37%	389	66.95%	33	5.68%
1912	292	31.74%	390	42.39%	238	25.87%
1916	477	34.92%	889	65.08%	0	0.00%
1920	988	52.41%	888	47.11%	9	0.48%
1924	170	23.04%	563	76.29%	5	0.68%
1928	151	14.79%	869	85.11%	1	0.10%
1932	49	3.63%	1,301	96.30%	1	0.07%
1936	39	4.10%	913	95.90%	0	0.00%
1940	99	9.66%	916	89.37%	10	0.98%
1944	141	12.00%	1,034	88.00%	0	0.00%
1948	378	22.49%	1,108	65.91%	195	11.60%
1952	595	24.07%	1,871	75.69%	6	0.24%
1956	767	31.89%	1,616	67.19%	22	0.91%
1960	626	23.66%	1,780	67.27%	240	9.07%
1964	1,410	36.32%	2,468	63.58%	4	0.10%
1968	488	12.91%	1,209	31.98%	2,084	55.12%
1972	2,318	67.52%	1,115	32.48%	0	0.00%
1976	699	18.67%	3,045	81.33%	0	0.00%
1980	1,243	32.29%	2,517	65.39%	89	2.31%
1984	1,860	43.54%	2,406	56.32%	6	0.14%
1988	1,557	41.04%	2,204	58.09%	33	0.87%
1992	1,142	26.27%	2,805	64.53%	400	9.20%
1996	907	24.73%	2,517	68.62%	244	6.65%
2000	1,526	43.03%	1,957	55.19%	63	1.78%
2004	1,921	46.75%	2,149	52.30%	39	0.95%
2008	2,513	57.04%	1,710	38.81%	183	4.15%
2012	2,199	59.02%	1,425	38.24%	102	2.74%
2016	2,455	64.17%	1,252	32.72%	119	3.11%
2020	2,729	70.43%	1,032	26.63%	114	2.94%
2024	2,502	74.20%	813	24.11%	57	1.69%

In Congress, Arkansas has been represented by two Republican senators (John Boozman and Tom Cotton) since January 3, 2015, ending a long history of Democratic hegemony. In the House of Representatives, Lincoln County is within Arkansas's 1st congressional district with many other agricultural Delta counties on the eastern side of the state. The district has been represented by Republican Rick Crawford since 2011.

In the Arkansas Senate, Lincoln County is split essentially in half between north and south. The northern half is within District 25, which also includes most of Jefferson and Phillips counties and a small portion of Desha County. The district has been represented by Stephanie Flowers, a Democratic lawyer from Pine Bluff, since January 2013. The southern half of Lincoln County is within District 26, which reaches to the southeastern corner of the state. District 26 has been represented by Eddie Cheatham, a Democratic retired educator from Crossett, since January 2013.

In the Arkansas House of Representatives, Lincoln County is split among three districts. The western third of Lincoln County is within District 10, which includes parts of four nearby counties. District 10 has been represented by Mike Holcomb since January 2013. Holcomb was initially elected as a Democrat, but switched to the Republican party in August 2015. The eastern third of the county is within District 12, which extends across Arkansas and Desha counties to include all of Phillips County. District 12 has been represented by Chris Richey, a Democratic pastor from Helena-West Helena, since January 2013. A small portion in northern Lincoln County, including Grady and Varner, is within District 16. The district contains the eastern half of Jefferson County, including the southeastern half of Pine Bluff, and has been represented by Ken Ferguson, a Democrat, since January 2015. District 13 has been represented by David Hillman since 2013.

=== Taxation ===
Property tax is assessed by the Lincoln County Assessor annually based upon the fair market value of the property and determining which tax rate, commonly called a millage in Arkansas, will apply. The rate depends upon the property's location with respect to city limits, school district, and special tax increment financing (TIF) districts. This tax is collected by the Lincoln County Collector between the first business day of March of each year through October 15 without penalty. The Lincoln County Treasurer disburses tax revenues to various government agencies, such as cities, county road departments, fire departments, libraries, and police departments in accordance with the budget set by the quorum court.

== Communities ==
=== Cities ===
- Gould
- Grady
- Star City (county seat)

Lincoln County has 46 unincorporated communities and ghost towns within its borders. This is due to early settlers in Arkansas tending to settle in small clusters rather than incorporated towns. For example, communities like Varner had a post office and dozens of buildings at some point in their history. Other communities are simply a few dwellings at a crossroads that have adopted a common place name over time. Some are officially listed as populated places by the United States Geological Survey, and others are listed as historic settlements.

=== Unincorporated communities ===
- Avery
- Branchville
- Cades
- Cornerville
- Crigler
- Cummins Unit
- Douglas
- Feenyville
- Flynn
- Fresno
- Garnett
- Garrett Bridge
- Glendale
- Gourd
- Little Garnett
- Maroney
- Mills
- Nebo
- Palmyra
- Phenix
- Relfs Bluff
- Rose Hill
- Sarassa
- Shannon Tank
- Tarry
- Tyro
- Varner
- Warrenton
- Whitefield
- Woodville
- Yorktown

=== Historical communities ===
- Champion
- Four Groves
- Kimbrough
- Oakdale
- Quawpaw Village
- Rest
- Silt
- South Bend
- Todd
- Villa Vale
- Youngstown

=== Townships ===
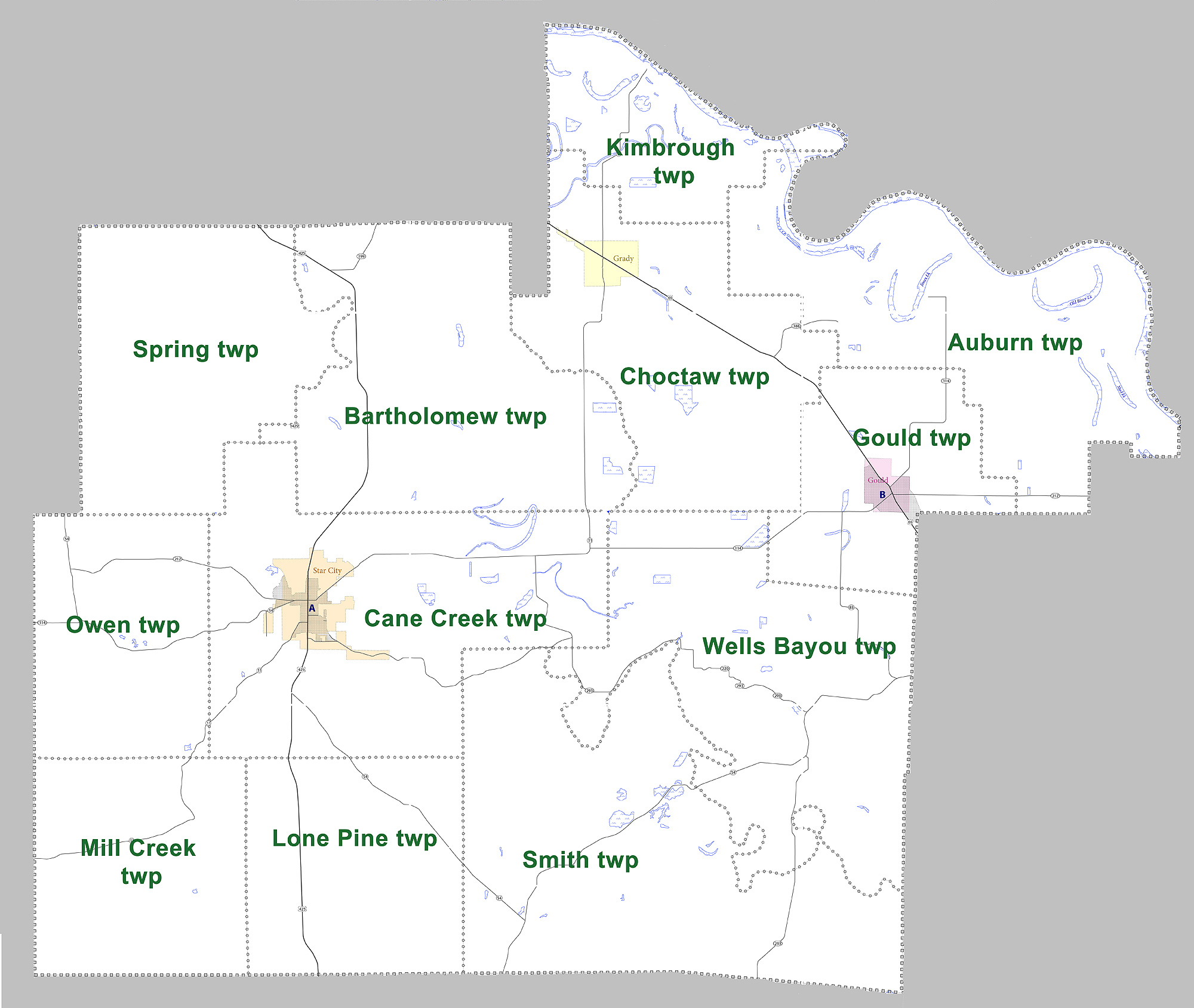
Townships in Lincoln County, Arkansas as of 2010

Townships in Arkansas are the divisions of a county. Each township includes unincorporated areas; some may have incorporated cities or towns within part of their boundaries. Arkansas townships have limited purposes in modern times. However, the United States census does list Arkansas population based on townships (sometimes referred to as "county subdivisions" or "minor civil divisions"). Townships are also of value for historical purposes in terms of genealogical research. Each town or city is within one or more townships in an Arkansas county based on census maps and publications. The townships of Lincoln County are listed below; listed in parentheses are the cities, towns, and/or census-designated places that are fully or partially inside the township.

- Auburn
- Bartholomew
- Cane Creek (contains Star City)
- Choctaw (contains Grady)
- Gould (contains Gould)
- Kimbrough
- Lone Pine
- Mill Creek
- Owen
- Smith
- Spring
- Wells Bayou

== Infrastructure ==
=== Aviation ===
Lincoln County contains one public owned/public use general aviation airport, Star City Municipal Airport. For the twelve-month period ending February 28, 2014, the facility saw 5,400 general aviation operations. The nearest commercial service airport is Clinton National Airport in Little Rock.

=== Major highways ===
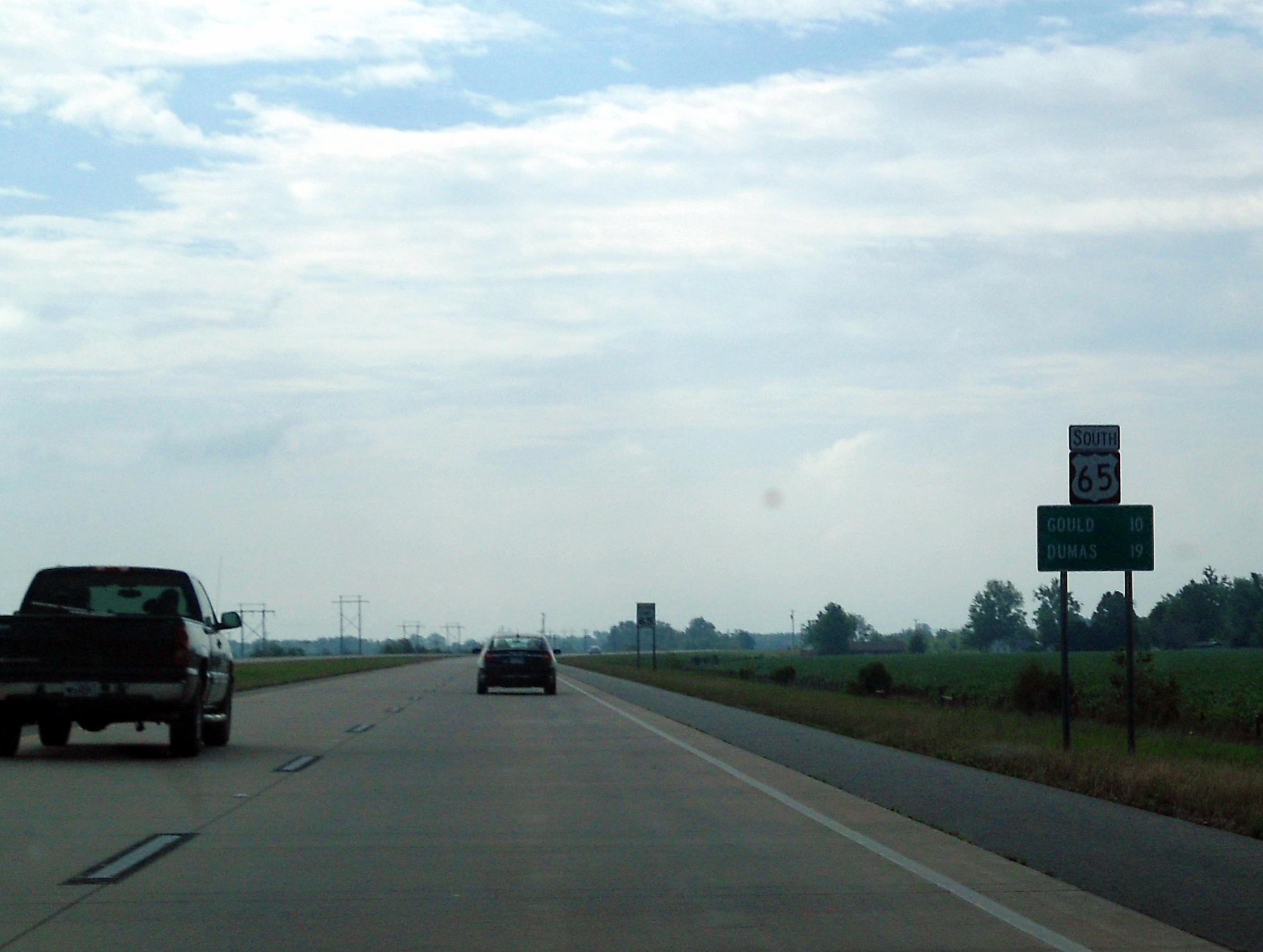
US 65 between Grady and Gould

- US 65
- US 425
- AR 11
- AR 54
- AR 83
- AR 114
- AR 199
- AR 212
- AR 293
- AR 530
- AR 980

=== Utilities ===
==== Water ====
The Arkansas Department of Health (ADH) is responsible for the regulation and oversight of public water systems throughout the state. Six community water systems are based in Lincoln County: Yorktown Water Association, Arkansas Department of Corrections - Cummins Unit, Star City Water, Gould Municipal Water/Sewer, Grady Waterworks, and the Garrett Bridge Water Association. All of these utilities use the Sparta Sand Aquifer for source water. (Note: Though Garrett Bridge purchases water wholesale from Dumas, whose source is the Sparta Sand Aquifer.) Small, rural parts of the county are served by the Highway 63 Water Association and the Ladd Water Association.

Yorktown Water Association has the largest retail population, with 8,169 total retail population, mostly within Lincoln County. ADC Cummins Unit has a retail population of 3,800, followed by Star City with 2,842, Gould with 1,041, and all others under 1,000 retail population served.

==== Wastewater ====
The Arkansas Department of Environmental Quality (ADEQ) regulates and oversees wastewater treatment and discharge permits in the state. Lincoln County contains three municipal wastewater systems, and one active domestic NPDES permit for Cummins Unit.

== See also ==
- List of lakes in Lincoln County, Arkansas
- National Register of Historic Places listings in Lincoln County, Arkansas

== Sources ==
- Staff of the Arkansas Department of Parks and Tourism (2017). Arkansas Adventure Guide. Little Rock, Arkansas: Arkansas Department of Parks and Tourism.
- Staff of the Arkansas Judiciary (July 20, 2017). "Arkansas Judicial Directory" (PDF). Little Rock: Arkansas Judiciary. Archived from the original (PDF) on December 4, 2015.
- Staff of the University of Arkansas Division of Agriculture Research and Extension (2015). "Rural Profile of Arkansas" (PDF). Little Rock: University of Arkansas Cooperative Extension Services. Archived (PDF) from the original on March 18, 2015.
