= Yorktown, Arkansas =

- Unincorporated community
- Location within Arkansas Location within the United States
- Coordinates: 34°01′15″N 91°49′00″W
- Country: United States
- State: Arkansas
- County: Lincoln
- Elevation: 184 ft (56 m)
- Time zone: UTC-6 (Central (CST))
  - Summer (DST): UTC-5 (CDT)
- ZIP code: 71678
- Area code: 870
- GNIS feature ID: 56609

Yorktown is an unincorporated community in Lincoln County, Arkansas, United States. Yorktown is located along Bayou Bartholomew and U.S. Route 425, 6 miles (9.7 km) north-northeast of Star City. Yorktown has a post office with ZIP code 71678.
