= Lindbergh Thomas =

American politician

Lindbergh H. Thomas is an American politician, and former state legislator in Arkansas. He served in the Arkansas House of Representatives in 1999, 2001, and 2003. He is Baptist. He was a Democrat with a mailing address in Grady, Arkansas.
