= Thomas R. Kersh =

American politician

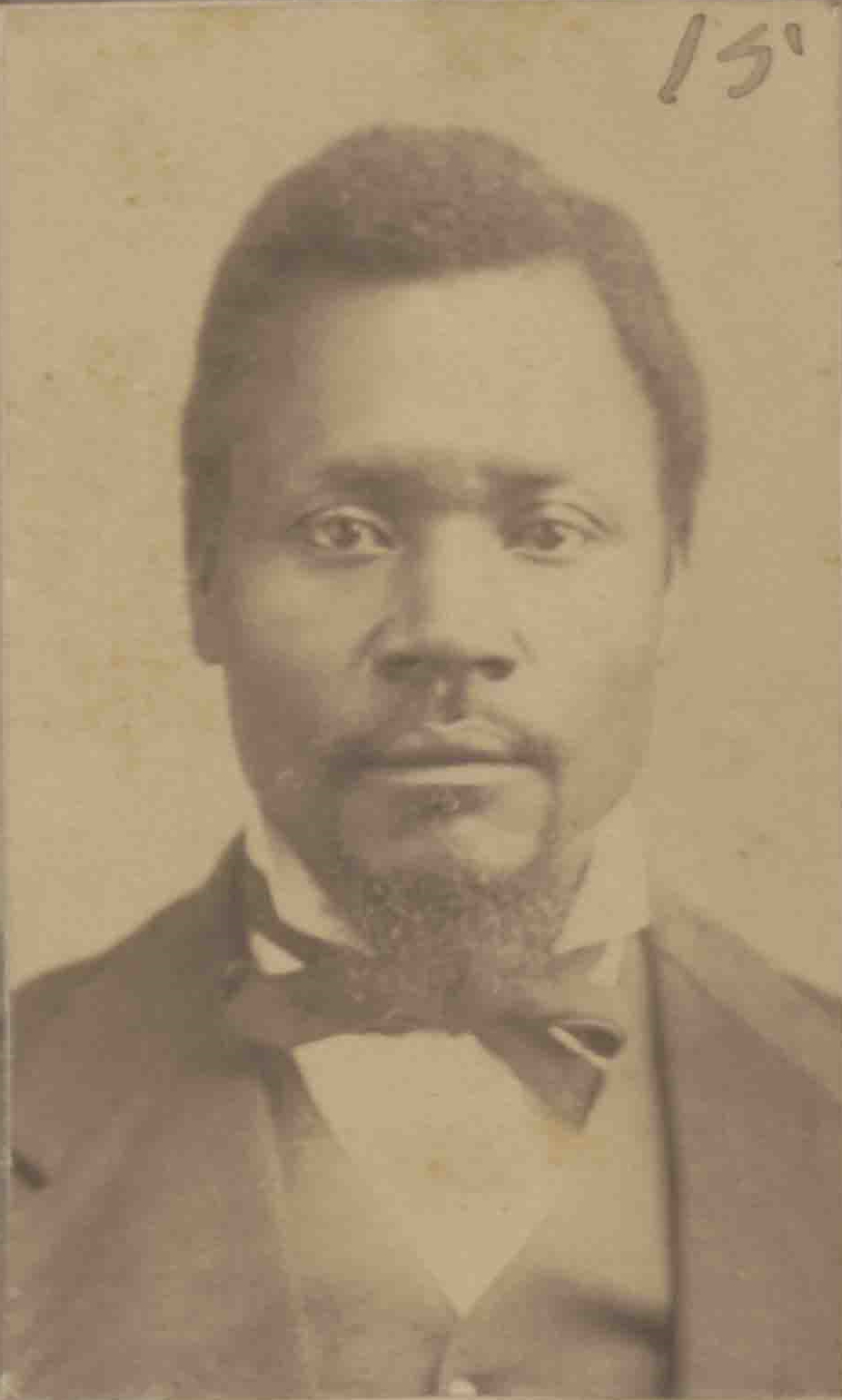

1885 House of Representatives composite photo of the Twenty-Fifth General Assembly of the State of Arkansas

Thomas R. Kersh (died 1916) was a state legislator in Arkansas. A Republican, he represented Lincoln County, Arkansas in the Arkansas House of Representatives in 1885 and 1887. According to the captioning from his 1885 House photograph he was 38 years old, was a native of South Carolina, had lived in Arkansas for 18 years, was a Republican, worked a Baptist Minister, and his post office was in Varner's Station.

== See also ==
- African American officeholders from the end of the Civil War until before 1900
