= S. L. Woolfolk =

Arkansas politician

Samuel L. Woolfolk (November 10, 1858 - ?), sometimes spelled Woodfork, was a member of the Arkansas Legislature in 1891. He represented Jefferson County, Arkansas. He was included in a photo montage of African American state legislators serving in Arkansas in 1891 published in The Freeman newspaper in Indianapolis.

Woodfolk was born in Houston County, Georgia. He attended high school there in 1869, went to Lewis High School in Macon, Georgia in 1870, and moved with his family to Crittenden County, Arkansas in 1871.

He pastored at a church in Moscow, Arkansas. The historic site includes a cemetery, and is listed on the Arkansas Register of Historic Places.
