= Bartholomew Township, Lincoln County, Arkansas =

Township in Lincoln County, Arkansas, United States

Bartholomew Township
- Township
- Location in Arkansas Bartholomew Township (the United States)
- Coordinates: 34°01′51″N 91°46′17″W
- Country: United States
- State: Arkansas
- County: Lincoln

Area
  - Total: 58.766 sq mi (152.20 km^{2})
  - Land: 58.200 sq mi (150.74 km^{2})
  - Water: 0.566 sq mi (1.47 km^{2})
- Elevation: 180 ft (55 m)

Population (2010)
  - Total: 687
  - Density: 11.8/sq mi (4.56/km^{2})
- Time zone: UTC-6 (CST)
  - Summer (DST): UTC-5 (CDT)
- FIPS code: 05-90135
- GNIS ID: 66820

Bartholomew Township is a township in Lincoln County, in the U.S. state of Arkansas. Its total population was 687 as of the 2010 United States census, a decrease of 19.84 percent from 857 at the 2000 census.

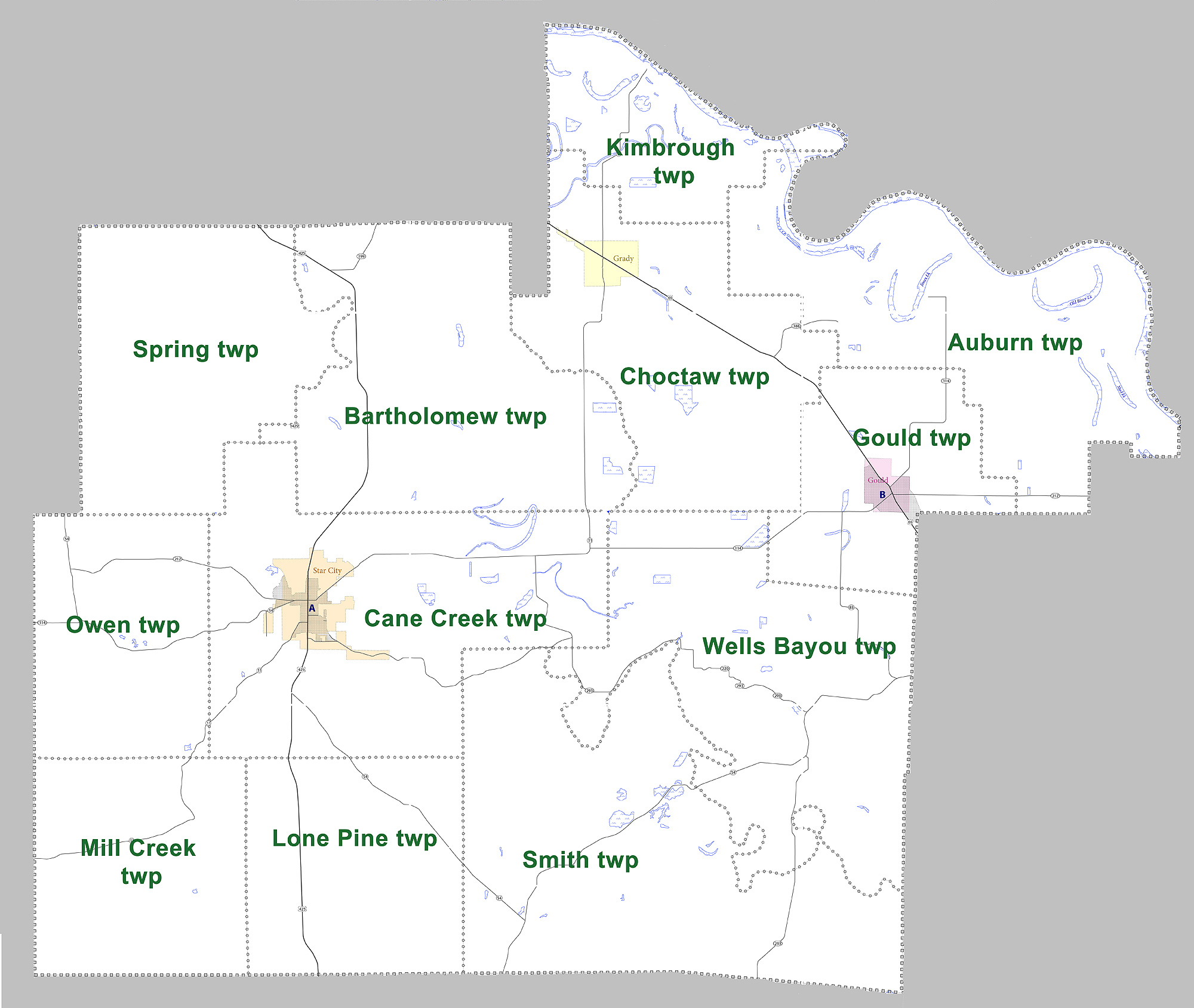
Townships in Lincoln County as of 2010

According to the 2010 Census, Bartholomew Township is located at 34°01′51″N 91°46′17″W (34.030863, -91.771290). It has a total area of 58.766 square miles (152.20 square kilometers), of which 58.200 sq mi (150.74 km^{2}) is land and 0.566 sq mi (1.47 km^{2}) is water (0.96%). As per the USGS National Elevation Dataset, the elevation is 180 feet (55 m).
