= Configuration design =

Type of design in engineering

Configuration design is a kind of design where a fixed set of predefined components that can be interfaced (connected) in predefined ways is given, and an assembly (i.e. designed artifact) of components selected from this fixed set is sought that satisfies a set of requirements and obeys a set of constraints.

The associated design configuration problem consists of the following three constituent tasks:

1. Selection of components,
2. Allocation of components, and
3. Interfacing of components (design of ways the components interface/connect with each other).

Types of knowledge involved in configuration design include:

- Problem-specific knowledge:
  - Input knowledge:
    - Requirements
    - Constraints
    - Technology
  - Case knowledge
- Persistent knowledge (knowledge that remains valid over multiple problem solving sessions):
  - Case knowledge
  - Domain-specific, method-independent knowledge
  - Method-specific domain knowledge
  - Search-control knowledge

== See also ==
- Systems design
- Modular design
- Morphological analysis (problem-solving)
- Constraint satisfaction problem
