= SDL =

SDL may refer to:

== Computing ==
- Specification and Description Language, defined by ITU
- Simple DirectMedia Layer, a C programming language library
- Services Description Language, a Microsoft fore-runner to Web Services Description Language
- Scene Description Language, used by POV-Ray
- Structure Definition Language of OpenVMS
- Security Development Lifecycle, a software development process

== Organizations ==
- Party of the Democratic Left (Slovakia) (SDĽ, 1990–2004)
- Former Party of the Democratic Left (Czech Republic)
- Party of the Democratic Left (2005), SDĽ, Slovakia
- Scottish Defence League, a far-right anti-Muslim organisation
- Social Democratic League of America, 1917–1920
- Software Development Laboratories, the original name of what is today known as Oracle Corporation
- Soqosoqo Duavata ni Lewenivanua, a political party in Fiji
- Space Dynamics Laboratory, at Utah State University, US
- SDL plc (formerly SDL International), a UK translation tool company

== Other uses ==
- Saudi Digital Library
- Shielded data link connector, an electrical signal connector
- Sexual division of labour
- Sound Digital - also known as SDL National, a digital radio multiplex in the United Kingdom
- Standard Deontic Logic, an extension of classical propositional logic
- Sundsvall–Timrå Airport, by IATA airport code
- Scottsdale Airport, by FAA airport code
- Supplier Documentation List

== See also ==
- Software development life cycle (SDLC)
