= Varner, Arkansas =

- Unincorporated community
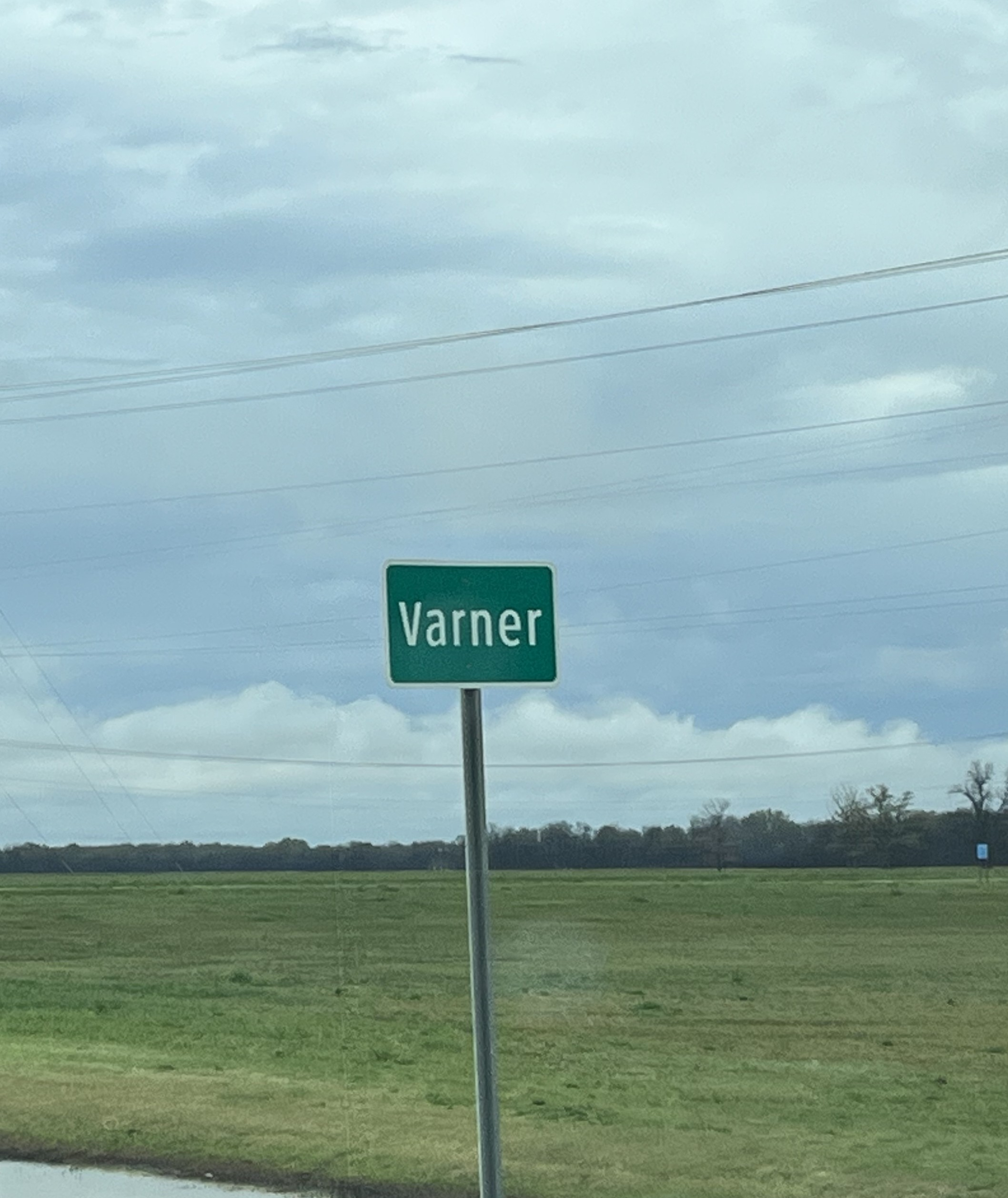

- Location within Arkansas Location within the United States
- Coordinates: 34°02′18″N 91°37′08″W
- Country: United States
- State: Arkansas
- County: Lincoln
- Elevation: 177 ft (54 m)
- Time zone: UTC-6 (Central (CST))
  - Summer (DST): UTC-5 (CDT)
- GNIS feature ID: 57220

Varner is an unincorporated community in Lincoln County, Arkansas, United States. Varner is located southeast of Little Rock.

== History ==
In 1952, Varner had three residents.

In 1958, Varner, which had five residents, had a crossroads, gas station and a store.

By 1975, parts of the area were within the boundary of the Cummins Unit. The center of the community is now entirely in ADC land.

== Government and infrastructure ==
The Cummins/Varner Volunteer Fire Department provides fire services. The station is along Arkansas Highway 388.

Varner houses the Arkansas Department of Correction Varner Unit. The Cummins Unit is located nearby. The main campus of the Riverside Vocational Technical School is located behind the Varner Unit.

== Education ==
In 1952 the area was zoned to the Grady School District.
