= Modular design =

Design approach

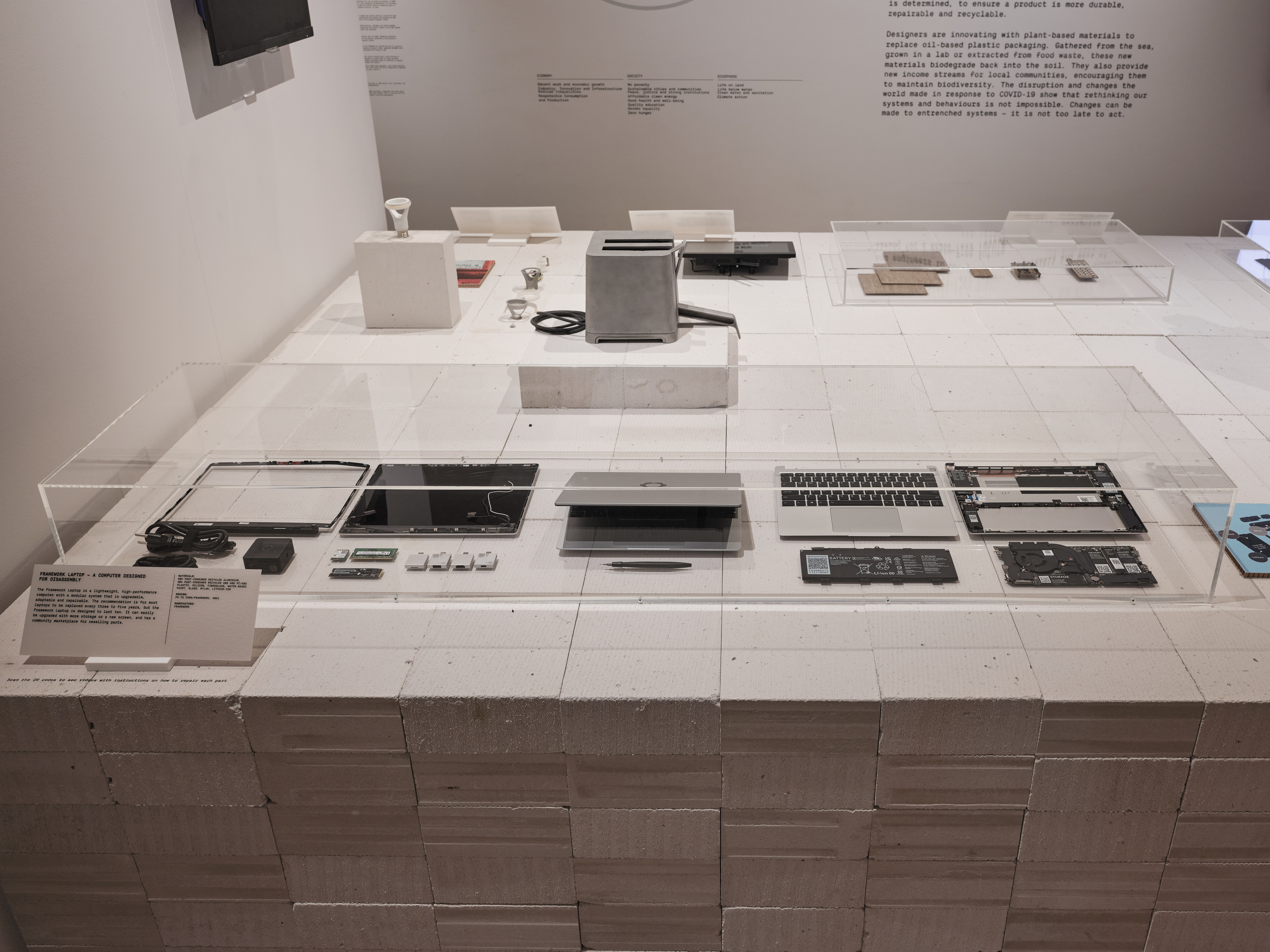
A laptop that is designed to be modular

Modular design, or modularity in design, is a design principle that subdivides a system into smaller parts called modules (such as modular process skids), which can be independently created, modified, replaced, or exchanged with other modules or between different systems.

== Overview ==
A modular design can be characterized by functional partitioning into discrete scalable and reusable modules, rigorous use of well-defined modular interfaces, and making use of industry standards for interfaces. This partitioning makes standardization easier to achieve, and product variability possible. In this context modularity is at the component level, and has a single dimension, component slotability. A modular system with this limited modularity is generally known as a platform system that uses modular components. Examples are car platforms or the USB port in computer engineering platforms.

In design theory this is distinct from a modular system which has higher dimensional modularity and degrees of freedom. A modular system design has no distinct lifetime and exhibits flexibility in at least three dimensions. In this respect modular systems are very rare in markets. Mero architectural systems are the closest example to a modular system in terms of hard products in markets. Weapons platforms, especially in aerospace, tend to be modular systems, wherein the airframe is designed to be upgraded multiple times during its lifetime, without the purchase of a completely new system. Modularity is best defined by the dimensions effected or the degrees of freedom in form, cost, or operation.

Modular design inherently combines the mass production advantages of standardization with those of customization. The degree of modularity, dimensionally, determines the degree of customization possible. For example, solar panel systems have 2-dimensional modularity which allows adjustment of an array in the x and y dimensions. Further dimensions of modularity would be introduced by making the panel itself and its auxiliary systems modular. Dimensions in modular systems are defined as the effected parameter such as shape or cost or lifecycle. Mero systems have 4-dimensional modularity, x, y, z, and structural load capacity. As can be seen in any modern convention space, the space frame's extra two dimensions of modularity allows far greater flexibility in form and function than solar's 2-d modularity. If modularity is properly defined and conceived in the design strategy, modular systems can create significant competitive advantage in markets. A true modular system does not need to rely on product cycles to adapt its functionality to the current market state. Properly designed modular systems also introduce the economic advantage of not carrying dead capacity, increasing the capacity utilization rate and its effect on cost and pricing flexibility.

== Benefits and Drawbacks ==
=== Benefits ===
Modularity offers benefits such as reduction in:

- Cost
  - Customization can be limited to a portion of the system, rather than needing an overhaul of the entire system
  - When modules are standardized, there are less parts in the system, leading to reduced production time, and ease in inventory management
- Interoperability
- Shorter learning time
- Flexibility in design
  - It molds to the user's needs without calling for an entire system redesign
- Non-generationally constrained augmentation or updating
  - Adding new solution by merely plugging in a new module
- Exclusion
  - The ability to remove a module from system
- Sustainability and minimized ecological harm
  - The expansion of product life (a system where only individual modules need changing or upgrading, not a full product discard)

Modularity in platform systems, offer benefits in:

- Returning margins to scale
- Reduced product development cost
- Reduced operating and maintenance costs
- Time to market

Platform systems have enabled the wide use of system design in markets and the ability for product companies to separate the rate of the product cycle from the research and development paths.

=== Drawbacks ===
The biggest drawback with modular systems is the designer or engineer. Most designers are poorly trained in systems analysis and most engineers are poorly trained in design. The design complexity of a modular system is significantly higher than a platform system and requires experts in design and product strategy during the conception phase of system development. That phase must anticipate the directions and levels of flexibility necessary in the system to deliver the modular benefits. Modular systems could be viewed as more complete or holistic design whereas platforms systems are more reductionist, limiting modularity to components. Complete or holistic modular design requires a much higher level of design skill and sophistication than the more common platform system.

== Platform systems ==
Cars, computers, process systems, solar panels, wind turbines, elevators, furniture, looms, railroad signaling systems, telephone exchanges, pipe organs, synthesizers, electric power distribution systems, drum sets, and modular buildings are examples of platform systems using various levels of component modularity. For example, one cannot assemble a solar cube from extant solar components or easily replace the engine on a truck or rearrange a modular housing unit into a different configuration after a few years, as would be the case in a modular system. These key characteristics make modular furniture incredibly versatile and adaptable. The only extant examples of modular systems in today's market are some software systems that have shifted away from versioning into a completely networked paradigm.

== Applications ==
=== In vehicles ===
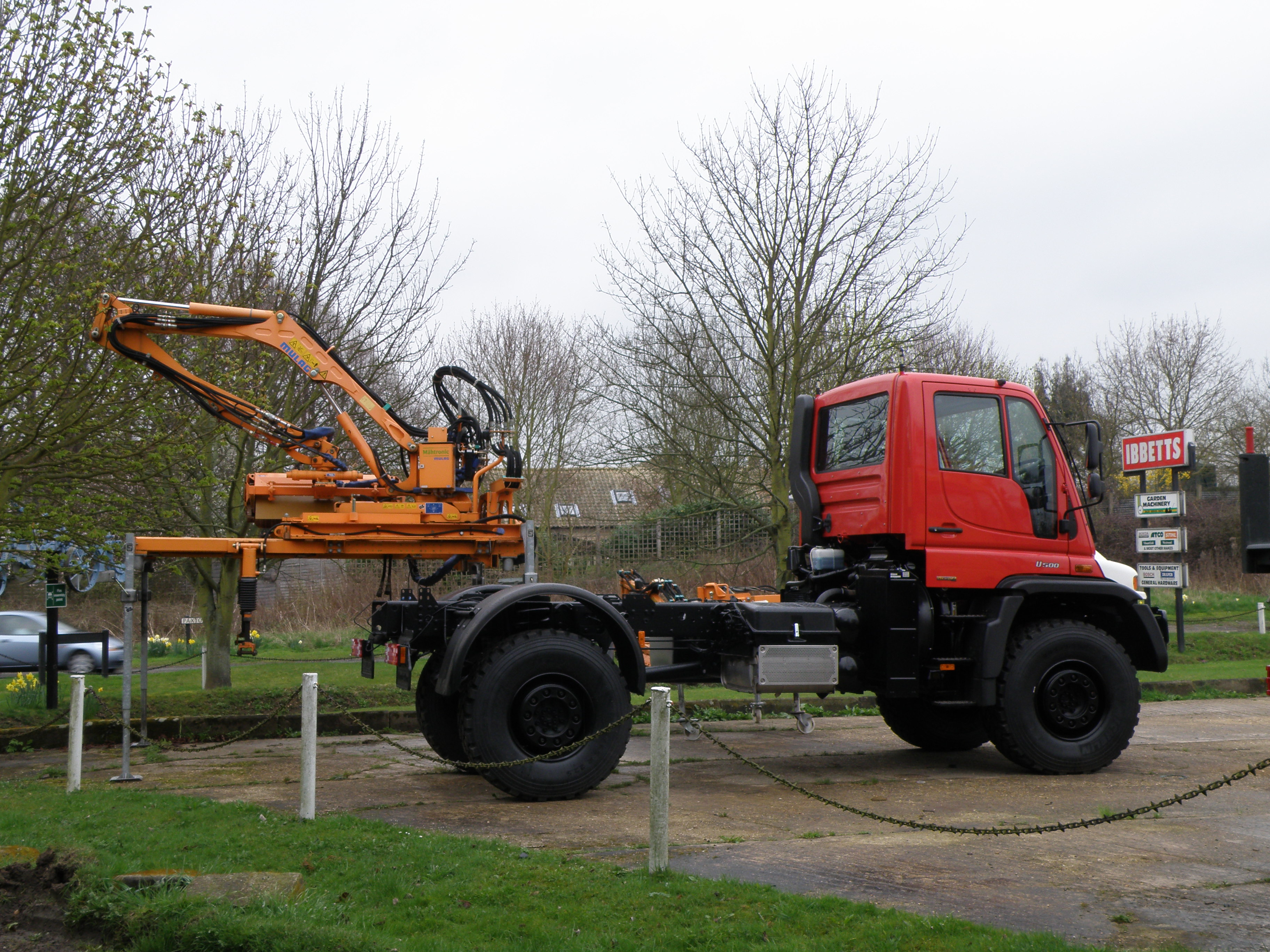
The modular design of the Unimog offers attachment capabilities for various different implements.

Aspects of modular design can be seen in cars or other vehicles to the extent of there being certain parts to the car that can be added or removed without altering the rest of the car.

A simple example of modular design in cars is the fact that, while many cars come as a basic model, paying extra will allow for "snap in" upgrades such as a more powerful engine, vehicle audio, ventilated seats, or seasonal tires; these do not require any change to other units of the car such as the chassis, steering, electric motor or battery systems.

=== In machines and architecture ===
Modular design can be seen in certain buildings. Modular buildings (and also modular homes) generally consist of universal parts (or modules) that are manufactured in a factory and then shipped to a build site where they are assembled into a variety of arrangements.

Modular buildings can be added to or reduced in size by adding or removing certain components. This can be done without altering larger portions of the building. Modular buildings can also undergo changes in functionality using the same process of adding or removing components.

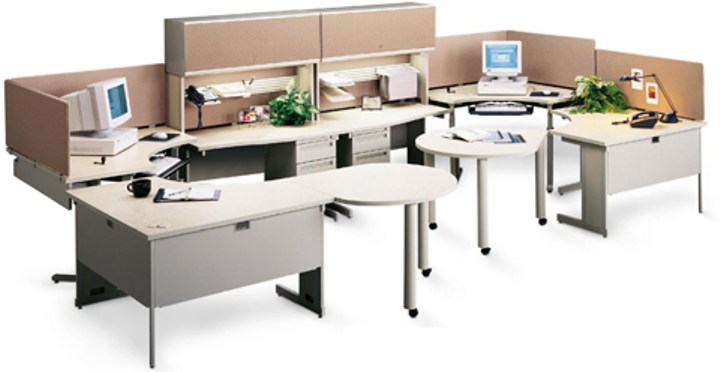
Modular workstations

For example, an office building can be built using modular parts such as walls, frames, doors, ceilings, and windows. The interior can then be partitioned (or divided) with more walls and furnished with desks, computers, and whatever else is needed for a functioning workspace. If the office needs to be expanded or redivided to accommodate employees, modular components such as wall panels can be added or relocated to make the necessary changes without altering the whole building. Later, this same office can be broken down and rearranged to form a retail space, conference hall or another type of building, using the same modular components that originally formed the office building. The new building can then be refurnished with whatever items are needed to carry out its desired functions.

Other types of modular buildings that are offered from a company like Allied Modular include a guardhouse, machine enclosure, press box, conference room, two-story building, clean room and many more applications.

Many misconceptions are held regarding modular buildings. In reality modular construction is a viable method of construction for quick turnaround and fast growing companies. Industries that would benefit from this include healthcare, commercial, retail, military, and multi-family/student housing.

=== In space stations ===
Modular construction of space stations is favored to minimize payload mass, volume, and cost, increasing options for launch vehicles, and increasing redundancy. The Soviet and Russian Mir space station from 1986 was the first to use an assembly of modules berthed together, with a total of six pressurized modules by 1996. This was followed by the International Space Station from 2000, with 16 major pressurized modules. From 2021, China constructed the Tiangong space station, with three modules. The Lunar Gateway was a cancelled modular space station in lunar near-rectilinear halo orbit, conceptualized by NASA and partners from 2017 to 2026, superseded by plans for a moonbase.

Modules can also be closed off, such as following the cargo spacecraft collision with Mir's Spektr in 1997, removed for deorbiting, such as of the ISS's Pirs module in 2021, or split of into a new station, as is planned for the ISS's Nauka to form the Russian Orbital Station.

=== In computer hardware ===
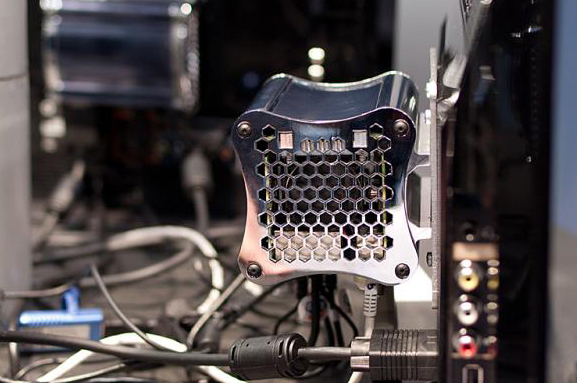
Modular computer design

Modular design in computer hardware is the same as in other things (e.g. cars, refrigerators, and furniture). The idea is to build computers with easily replaceable parts that use standardized interfaces. This technique allows a user to upgrade certain aspects of the computer easily without having to buy another computer altogether.

A computer is one of the best examples of modular design. Typical computer modules include a computer chassis, power supply units, processors, mainboards, graphics cards, hard drives, and optical drives. All of these parts should be easily interchangeable as long as the user uses parts that support the same standard interface.

=== In smartphones ===
The idea of a modular smartphone was explored in Project Ara, which provided a platform for manufactures to create modules for a smartphone which could then be customised by the end user. The Fairphone uses a similar principle, where the user can purchase individual parts to repair or upgrade the phone.

=== In televisions ===
In 1963 Motorola introduced the first rectangular color picture tube, and in 1967 introduced the modular Quasar brand. In 1964 it opened its first research and development branch outside of the United States, in Israel under the management of Moses Basin. In 1974 Motorola sold its television business to the Japan-based Matsushita, the parent company of Panasonic.

=== In weaponry ===
Some firearms and weaponry use a modular design to make maintenance and operation easier and more familiar. For instance, German firearms manufacturer Heckler & Koch produces several weapons that, while being different types, are visually and, in many instances, internally similar. These are the G3 battle rifle, HK21 general-purpose machine gun, MP5 submachine gun, HK33 and G41 assault rifles, and PSG1 sniper rifle.

=== In trade show exhibits and retail displays ===
The concept of modular design has become popular with trade show exhibits and retail promotional displays. These kind of promotional displays involve creative custom designs but need a temporary structure that can be reusable. Thus many companies are adapting to the Modular way of exhibit design. In this they can use pre engineered modular systems that act as building blocks to creative a custom design. These can then be reconfigured to another layout and reused for a future show. This enables the user to reduce cost of manufacturing and labor (for set up and transport) and is a more sustainable way of creating experiential set ups.

== Designing for Modularity ==
General steps on how modular design is approached by designers:

1. Setting an objective
  - Clarifying the intended aim of the modular design
2. System and/or product analysis
  - Clarifying what the different systems are and how the modules work together or how they could work together
  - Understand how the different parts can be grouped together to improve the features and functionalities
3. Defining the modular interface
  - How the modules interact with each other and how they attach
4. Prototyping
  - Gives an evaluation of the product in an applied manner
  - Tests the features and if the modules work

Overall guidelines, based on a research done by Georgy Klushin, Clement Fortin and Zeljko Tekic, are grounded in setting a strategic objective, establishing a hierarchy, determining the drivers for modularization, applying relevant modularization principles, and using metrics to support the development process. The modular structure of new products with many different applications, use this method to help with designing and development. With this modular design guideline, the development process can begin, and specific modular design techniques can be implemented simultaneously.

An important modularization method is the Modular Function Deployment (MFD), which is defined in an article by Fabio Marco Monetti as a method concentrated on establishing the system's structural elements, which include modules and interfaces. This method's drawback however is that it neglects any information about how a part may be manufactured or how the different parts will be assembled. This neglected aspect causes the product to be lower quality while also potentially increasing the production cost. This is why the MDF is paired with the Design For Assembly (DFA) method. This second method allows the assembly to be simplified through part reduction and system optimization. Th combination of these two methods calls for more cross-industry collaboration to be done, so they call be implemented optimally and efficiently.

== Integrating the digital twin into modular design ==
Product lifecycle management is a strategy for efficiently managing information about a product (and product families, platforms, modules, and parts) during its product lifecycle. Researchers have described how integrating a digital twin—a digital representation of a physical product—with modular design can improve product lifecycle management.

== Integrating life-cycle and energy assessments into modular design ==
Some authors observe that modular design has generated in the vehicle industry a constant increase of weight over time. Trancossi advanced the hypothesis that modular design can be coupled by some optimization criteria derived from the constructal law. In fact, the constructal law is modular for his nature and can apply with interesting results in engineering simple systems. It applies with a typical bottom-up optimization schema:

- a system can be divided into subsystems (elemental parts) using tree models;
- any complex system can be represented in a modular way and it is possible to describe how different physical magnitudes flow through the system;
- analyzing the different flowpaths it is possible to identify the critical components that affect the performance of the system;
- by optimizing those components and substituting them with more performing ones, it is possible to improve the performances of the system.

A better formulation has been produced during the MAAT EU FP7 Project. A new design method that couples the above bottom-up optimization with a preliminary system level top-down design has been formulated. The two step design process has been motivated by considering that constructal and modular design does not refer to any objective to be reached in the design process. A theoretical formulation has been provided in a 2015 paper, and applied with success to the design of a small aircraft, the conceptual design of innovative commuter aircraft, the design of a new entropic wall, and an innovative off-road vehicle designed for energy efficiency.

== See also ==
- 3D printing
- Cellular automaton
- Configuration design
- Holarchy
- Holism
- Kraftei
- Modular building
- Modular construction systems
- Modular function deployment (MFD)
- Modular programming
- Modular smartphone
- Modular weapon system
- Modularity
- Open-design movement
- Open-source hardware
- OpenStructures
- Pattern language
- Reconfigurable manufacturing system
- Separation of concerns
- Systems design
- Systems engineering
- System integration
- Toolhead, modular part of a tool that is held and acts directly on the workpiece
