= Structured data analysis =

Structured data analysis may refer to:

- Structured data analysis (statistics) – the search for structure in a dataset
- Structured data analysis (systems analysis) – a project management technique
- Structured data mining – a machine learning and data analysis technique
