= Mill Creek Township, Lincoln County, Arkansas =

Township in Lincoln County, Arkansas, United States

Coordinates: 33°51′N 91°55′W

Mill Creek Township is a township in Lincoln County, in the U.S. state of Arkansas. Its population was 247 as of the 2020 census.
