= Grady, Arkansas =

- City
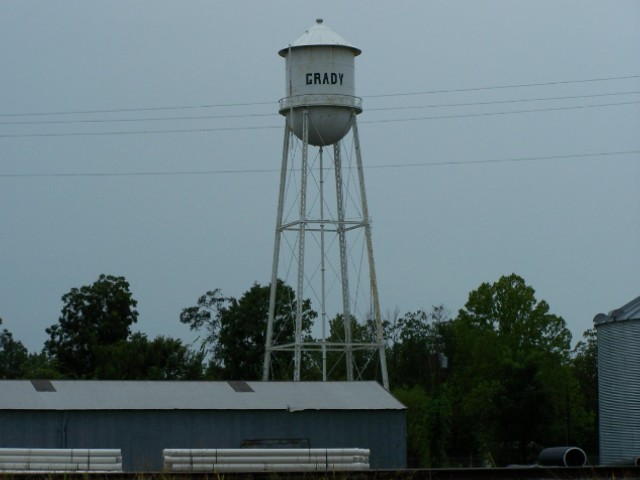

- Location in Lincoln County, Arkansas
- Coordinates: 34°04′21″N 91°41′51″W
- Country: United States
- State: Arkansas
- County: Lincoln

Area
  - Total: 1.85 sq mi (4.80 km^{2})
  - Land: 1.85 sq mi (4.80 km^{2})
  - Water: 0 sq mi (0.00 km^{2})
- Elevation: 177 ft (54 m)

Population (2020)
  - Total: 305
  - Estimate (2025): 283 ▼
  - Density: 164/sq mi (63.5/km^{2})
- Time zone: UTC-6 (Central (CST))
  - Summer (DST): UTC-5 (CDT)
- ZIP code: 71644
- Area code: 870
- FIPS code: 05-27790
- GNIS feature ID: 2403720

Grady is a city in Lincoln County, Arkansas, United States. The population was 305 at the 2020 census, down from 449 at the 2010 census.

== Geography ==
Grady is located in northeastern Lincoln County along U.S. Route 65. It is 22 miles (35 km) southeast of Pine Bluff and 11 miles (18 km) northwest of Gould.

According to the United States Census Bureau, Grady has a total area of 1.9 square miles (4.8 km^{2}), all land.

== Demographics ==
Historical population
Census	Pop.	Note	%±
1910	180		—
1920	398		121.1%
1930	496		24.6%
1940	472		−4.8%
1950	517		9.5%
1960	622		20.3%
1970	688		10.6%
1980	488		−29.1%
1990	586		20.1%
2000	523		−10.8%
2010	449		−14.1%
2020	305		−32.1%
2025 (est.)	283	▼	−7.2%
U.S. Decennial Census; 2018 Estimate

=== Racial and ethnic composition ===
Grady city, Arkansas – Racial and ethnic composition Note: the US Census treats Hispanic/Latino as an ethnic category. This table excludes Latinos from the racial categories and assigns them to a separate category. Hispanics/Latinos may be of any race.
Race / Ethnicity (NH = Non-Hispanic)	Pop 2000	Pop 2010	Pop 2020	% 2000	% 2010	% 2020
White alone (NH)	160	116	73	30.59%	25.84%	23.93%
Black or African American alone (NH)	342	307	182	65.39%	68.37%	59.67%
Native American or Alaska Native alone (NH)	0	1	0	0.00%	0.22%	0.00%
Asian alone (NH)	1	0	1	0.19%	0.00%	0.33%
Native Hawaiian or Pacific Islander alone (NH)	0	0	0	0.00%	0.00%	0.00%
Other race alone (NH)	1	0	1	0.19%	0.00%	0.33%
Mixed race or Multiracial (NH)	4	9	12	0.76%	2.00%	3.93%
Hispanic or Latino (any race)	15	16	36	2.87%	3.56%	11.80%
Total	523	449	305	100.00%	100.00%	100.00%

=== 2020 census ===
As of the 2020 United States census, there were 305 people, 178 households, and 91 families residing in the city.

=== 2000 census ===
As of the census of 2000, there were 523 people, 184 households, and 142 families residing in the city. The population density was 278.0 inhabitants per square mile (107.3/km^{2}). There were 241 housing units at an average density of 128.1 per square mile (49.5/km^{2}). The racial makeup of the city was 31.36% White, 65.77% Black or African American, 0.19% Asian, 1.72% from other races, and 0.96% from two or more races. 2.87% of the population were Hispanic or Latino of any race.

There were 184 households, out of which 34.8% had children under the age of 18 living with them, 49.5% were married couples living together, 21.2% had a female householder with no husband present, and 22.8% were non-families. 20.7% of all households were made up of individuals, and 4.9% had someone living alone who was 65 years of age or older. The average household size was 2.84 and the average family size was 3.32.

In the city, the population was spread out, with 33.5% under the age of 18, 9.2% from 18 to 24, 23.1% from 25 to 44, 19.5% from 45 to 64, and 14.7% who were 65 years of age or older. The median age was 34 years. For every 100 females, there were 97.4 males. For every 100 females age 18 and over, there were 93.3 males.

The median income for a household in the city was $22,321, and the median income for a family was $24,500. Males had a median income of $26,250 versus $20,313 for females. The per capita income for the city was $11,679. About 33.6% of families and 38.8% of the population were below the poverty line, including 51.3% of those under age 18 and 28.3% of those age 65 or over.

== Government and infrastructure ==
Arkansas Department of Correction operates the Cummins Unit and the Varner Unit in Varner, an unincorporated area in Lincoln County, near Grady.

== Education ==
The Star City School District operates public schools serving Grady. Its high school is Star City High School.

Previously Grady Public Schools operated public schools. In 2004 the Arkansas Legislature approved a law that forced school districts with fewer than 350 students apiece to consolidate with other districts. As a result, on July 1, 2004, the Grady School District was merged into the Star City district.
