= School Construction Systems Development project =

From 1961–1967, in the U.S., the School Construction Systems Development (SCSD) project created an innovative, flexible, and prefabricated architectural building system that ignited an international interest in systems-based architecture. The project emerged in response to the post-WWII baby boom, the mainstreaming of progressive education, the industrialization of building materials, and a nationwide search to build schools faster and cheaper. In 1961 Governor Nelson Rockefeller of New York proposed the use of stock plans (the same architectural plans on different sites). In response, the Architectural Forum and the Ford Foundation's Educational Facilities Laboratories (EFL) sponsored a conference of leading school administrators, architects, manufacturing executives, and engineers to devise alternative solutions.

The group agreed that a system of building components specifically designed for schools was an option worth exploring. Architect Ezra Ehrenkrantz (who later founded EE&K Architects) had previously studied the British CLASP system and other precedents and was charged with undertaking a feasibility study of the proposal. The project proved to be feasible and the SCSD was launched in 1962 with significant start-up funding from the Ford Foundation, "1) to create a system of standardized parts with which architects can design individual schools; 2) to reduce the cost of school construction by obtaining volume production of standard parts; and 3) to reduce the time needed for the construction of a school."

California was chosen as the initial test location for the system and Stanford University's School Planning Laboratory acted as the grant administrator. A follow-up study of the British prefabricated schools highlighted lessons drawn from these government-led projects to an American, market-driven approach. To entice manufacturers to invest in the necessary research and development for new building components, school districts from around the state signed a Joint Powers Agreement and formed the First California Commission on School Construction Systems. Along with this group of school administrators, SCSD staff members (Ezra Ehrenkrantz, James Laurits, John Boice, Christopher Arnold, Visscher Boyd, Vernon (Carl) Bryant, Bert Ray, and Peter Kastl) assembled education requirements and performance specifications for the new system.

Among the various requirements were four modes of flexibility—spatial variety, immediate change, long-range changeability, and expansion. The performance specifications also listed a variety of desirable building configurations; large structural open spans of up to 7,200 sq. ft.; narrow lighting, acoustic, and HVAC ranges; and other performance expectations. The components were divided into six sub-systems—1) Structure, 2) HVAC, 3) Lighting/Ceiling, 4) Partitions, 5) Cabinets, and 6) Lockers—that were to be integrated with the others and sent out for bids from manufacturers. The system did not include the exterior facade, which was to be designed in accordance with the desires and context of each local school and architect. The Structure and Lighting/Ceiling sub-systems were awarded to Inland Steel Products Company (under the direction of Joseph C. White) and were designed by Robertson Ward and The Engineers Collaborative. Lennox won the HVAC work. The Partition subsystem was supplied by E.F. Hauserman Co. (fixed and demountable partitions), Hough Manufacturing (accordion partitions), and Western Sky Industries (operable panel partitions). The Cabinet subsystem was awarded to Educators Manufacturing Company and the Lockers were by Worley.

A 3,600 sq. ft. mock-up of the system was built on Stanford University's campus on Pampas Drive to test the integration and performance of the entire system before construction of the schools could begin. This small building was widely published in the architectural press and a promotional film was produced. It has been used as a branch office of the Stanford Federal Credit Union since 1970.

Twelve schools were built using the SCSD system between 1965 and 1968.

1. Fountain Valley High School in Fountain Valley, CA
2. El Dorado High School in Placentia, CA
3. Sonora High School in Fullerton, CA
4. Casa Roble High School in Orangevale, CA (phase 1 & 2)
5. De Laveaga Elementary in Santa Cruz, CA
6. John F. Kennedy High School in Sacramento, CA
7. Oak Grove High School in San Jose, CA
8. Glen A. Wilson High School in Hacienda Heights, CA
9. William Workman High School in La Puente, CA
10. San Dieguito High School in Encinitas, CA
11. Royal High School in Simi, CA
12. Harbor High School in Santa Cruz, CA.

These schools successfully exhibited a wide range of building configurations and a couple won local AIA design awards. A handful of articles and a book from those directly involved in the project acknowledged that the buildings were not less expensive and that there were minor issues with the schools, but generally agreed that the project had accomplished its major objectives. The Ford Foundation sponsored the development of several similar projects such as the SSP in Florida (1967-1968), the SAF in Ontario (1969), the RAS in Quebec (1969), and URBS in California (1968).

An early study confirmed that the buildings were effectively transformed in the first few years to accommodate different learning styles. However, a recent study of De Laveaga Elementary, Oak Grove High, and Sonora High found that the schools were rarely rearranged and many of the SCSD components have been replaced with conventional construction materials because of an unsustained training of teachers and maintenance staff and difficulties with finding replacement parts.
