= Moscow, Arkansas =

- Unincorporated community
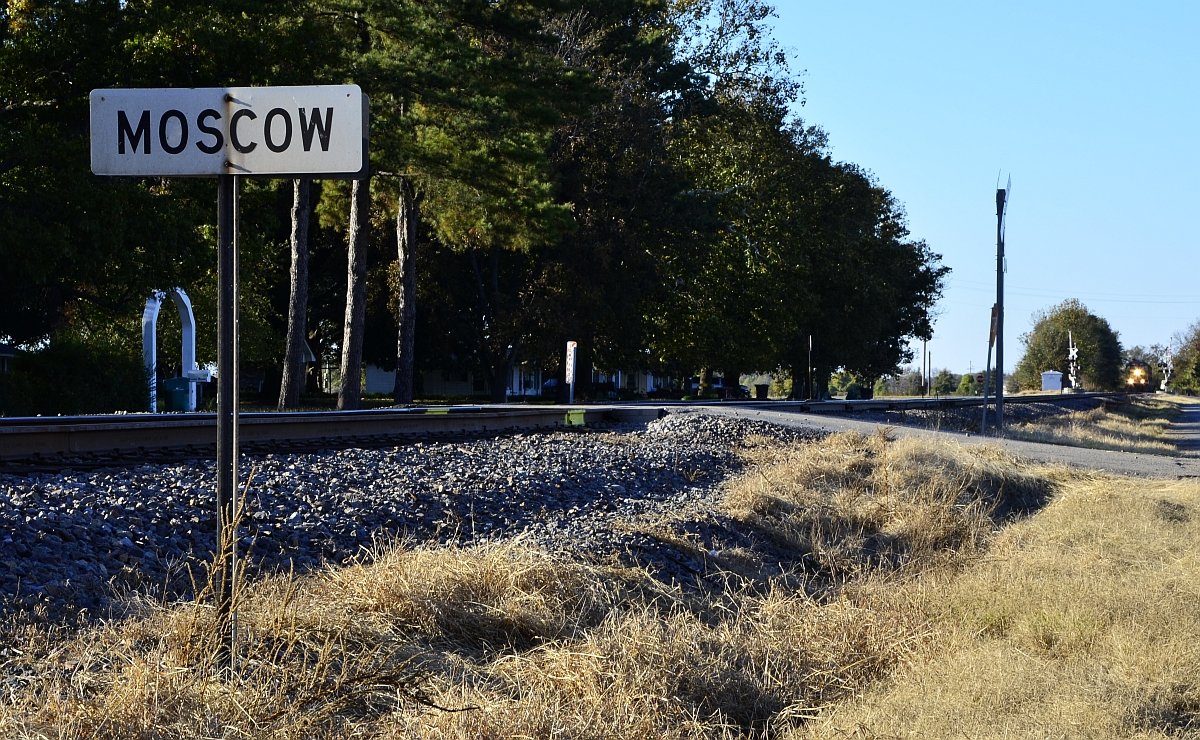
- Railway sign in Moscow, Arkansas

- Location in Arkansas
- Coordinates: 34°08′47″N 91°47′42″W
- Country: United States
- State: Arkansas
- County: Jefferson
- Township: Richland
- Elevation: 194 ft (59 m)
- Time zone: UTC-6 (Central (CST))
  - Summer (DST): UTC-5 (CDT)
- ZIP code: 71659
- Area code: 870
- GNIS feature ID: 52230
- Major airport: Clinton National (LIT)

Moscow is an unincorporated community in Jefferson County, Arkansas, United States. Moscow is located near the junction of U.S. Route 65 and Arkansas Highway 199, 13 miles (21 km) east-southeast of Pine Bluff. Moscow has a post office with ZIP code 71659.

== Education ==
Formerly in Linwood School District, Moscow is in the Pine Bluff School District. On July 1, 1984, the Linwood School District was consolidated into the Pine Bluff School District. As of 2021, all pre-kindergarten Pine Bluff School District areas were assigned to the Forrest Park/Greenville School.
