= Star City School District =

School district in Arkansas

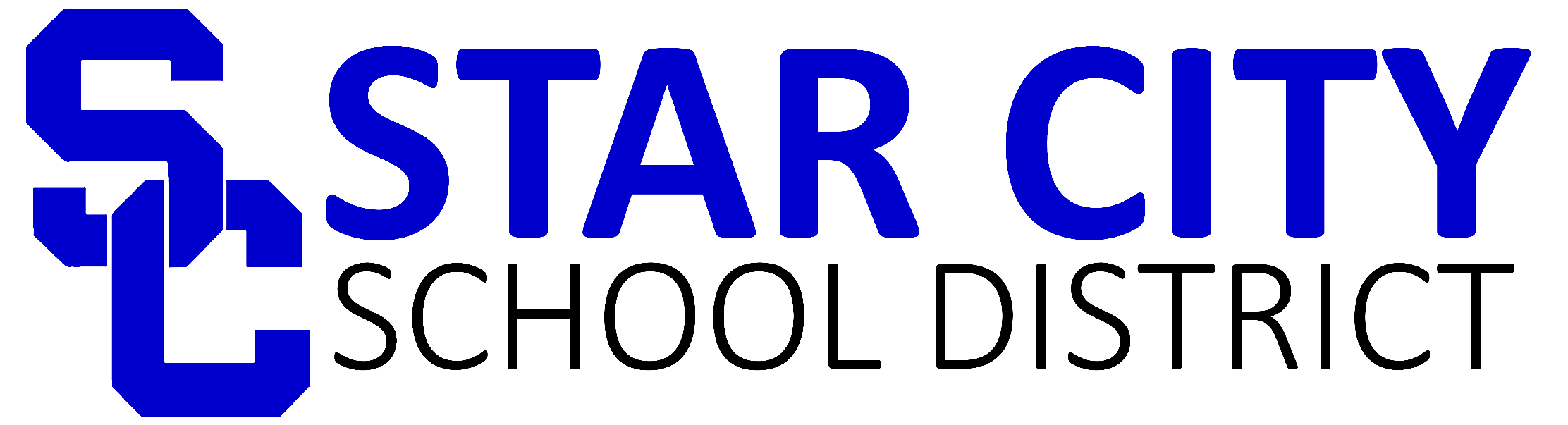

Location
- 400 E Arkansas St; Star City, Arkansas 71667 United States

District information
- Grades: PK–12
- Established: 1918
- Superintendent: Jordan Frizzell
- Accreditations: ADE; AdvancED (HS & MS)
- Schools: 3
- NCES District ID: 0500028

Students and staff
- Students: 1,389
- Teachers: 117 (on FTE basis)
- Staff: 183 (on FTE basis)
- Student–teacher ratio: 14.89
- Colors: Blue; White

Other information
- Website: www.starcityschools.org

Star City School District is a public school district headquartered in Star City, Arkansas, United States. The district serves Star City and Grady as well as multiple unincorporated areas.

Star City School District encompasses 402.34 square miles (1,042.1 km^{2}) of land in Lincoln and Cleveland counties.

== History ==
The school district was first established in 1918.

On July 1, 1985, the Glendale School District consolidated into the Star City district.

In 2004 the Arkansas Legislature approved a law that forced school districts with fewer than 350 students apiece to consolidate with other districts. In May 2004 the Arkansas Board of Education voted unanimously to merge the Grady School District into the Star City district. On July 1, 2004, the Grady School District was merged into the Star City district. Grady High, previously in operation, immediately closed, while Grady Elementary was still in operation.

== Schools ==
Its schools include Jimmy Brown Elementary School, Star City Middle School, and Star City High School.

In the 2004-2005 school year it operated Grady Elementary School. The 2005-2006 Arkansas School Directory did not list Grady Elementary.

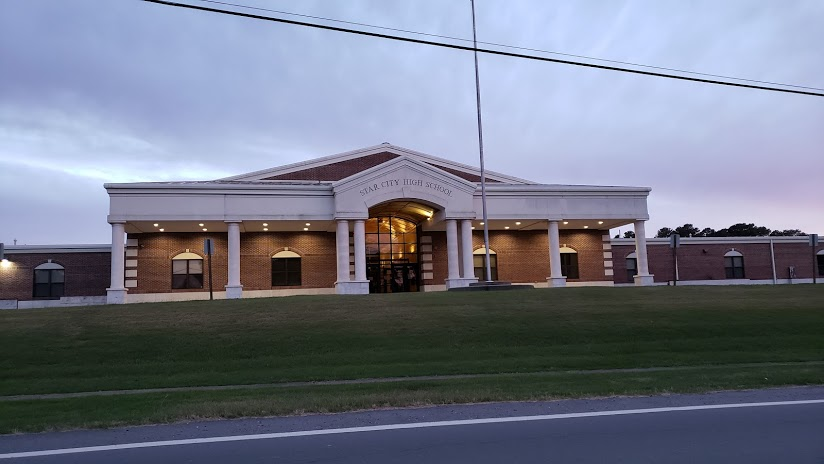
Star City High School
