= Structured data analysis (systems analysis) =

Structured data analysis (SDA) is a method for analysing the flow of information within an organization using data flow diagrams. It was originally developed by IBM for systems analysis in electronic data processing, although it has now been adapted for use to describe the flow of information in any kind of project or organization, particularly in the construction industry where the nodes could be departments, contractors, customers, managers, workers etc.

== See also ==
- Data modelling
- Information management
- Structured systems analysis and design method
