= Grady Public Schools =

Defunct school district in Arkansas, United States

Grady Public Schools was a school district with its headquarters in Grady, Arkansas, United States. Its territory is now within the Star City School District.

== History ==
In 2004 the Arkansas Legislature approved a law that forced school districts with fewer than 350 students apiece to consolidate with other districts. In May 2004 the Arkansas Board of Education rejected a voluntary proposal to consolidate the Grady school district with the Gould School District, because both school districts were majority African American and the merger would have violated federal desegregation laws. One week later, the board voted unanimously to merge Grady into the Star City School District. On July 1, 2004, the Grady School District was merged into the Star City district.

== Schools ==
In 1998 the district included an elementary school, a middle school, and a high school. In 2003 the school district had two schools, Grady Elementary School and Grady High School.
