= Star City, Arkansas =

- City
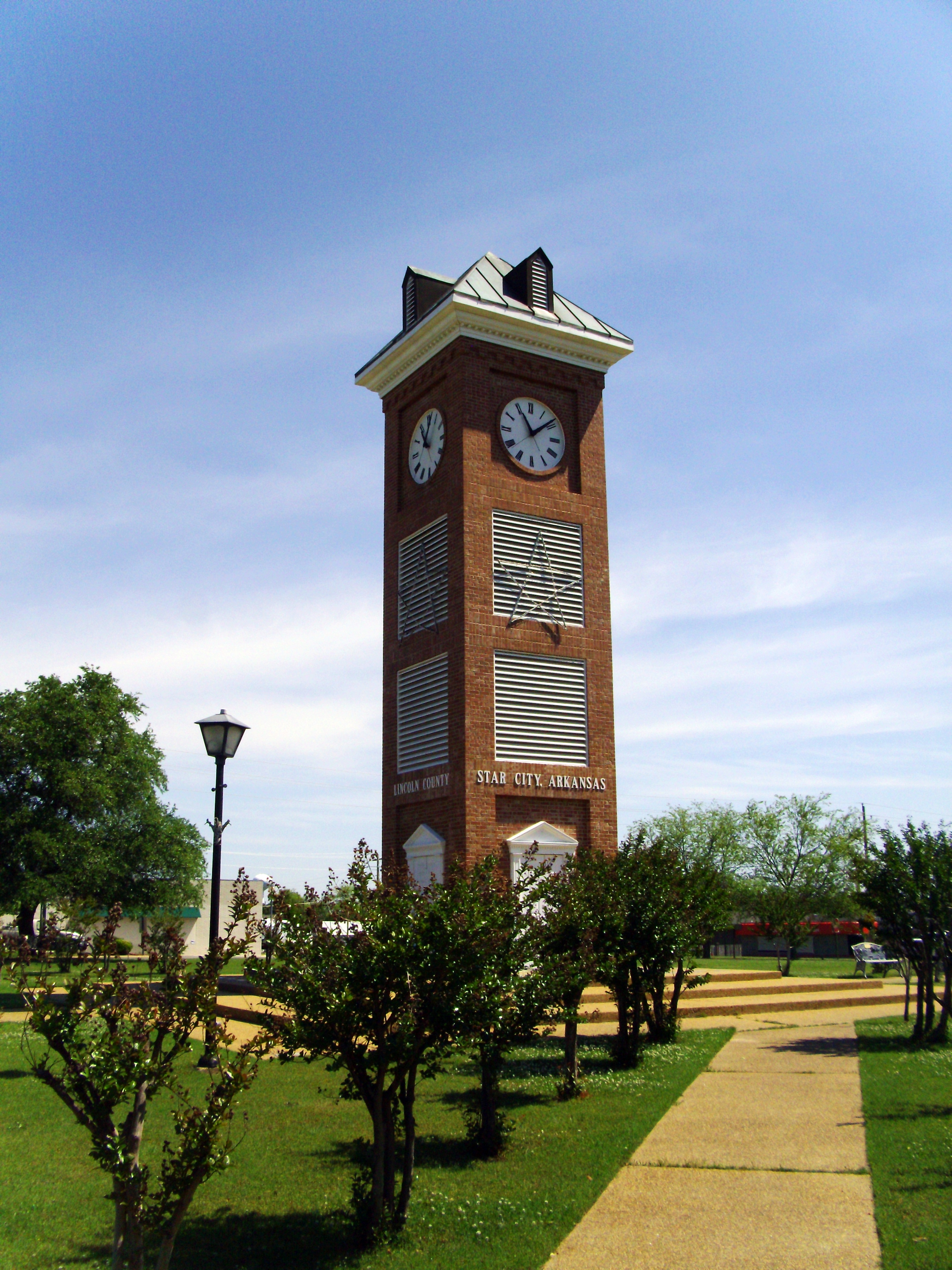
- Clock tower on the town square

- Location of Star City in Lincoln County, Arkansas.
- Coordinates: 33°56′27″N 91°50′24″W
- Country: United States
- State: Arkansas
- County: Lincoln

Area
  - Total: 4.80 sq mi (12.43 km^{2})
  - Land: 4.80 sq mi (12.43 km^{2})
  - Water: 0 sq mi (0.00 km^{2})
- Elevation: 282 ft (86 m)

Population (2020)
  - Total: 2,173
  - Estimate (2025): 2,059 ▼
  - Density: 453.0/sq mi (174.89/km^{2})
- Time zone: UTC-6 (Central (CST))
  - Summer (DST): UTC-5 (CDT)
- ZIP code: 71667
- Area code: 870
- FIPS code: 05-66440
- GNIS feature ID: 2405522

Star City is a city in and the county seat of Lincoln County, Arkansas, United States. Incorporated in 1876, the city is located between the Arkansas Delta and the Arkansas Timberlands. With an economy historically based on agriculture, today Star City has developed a diverse economy based on both industry and agriculture. As of the 2020 census, Star City had a population of 2,173.

== Geography ==
According to the United States Census Bureau, the city has a total area of 4.2 square miles (11 km^{2}), all land.

The city is located between Monticello and Pine Bluff.

== Demographics ==
Historical population
Census	Pop.	Note	%±
1890	204		—
1900	251		23.0%
1910	396		57.8%
1920	616		55.6%
1930	932		51.3%
1940	1,090		17.0%
1950	1,296		18.9%
1960	1,573		21.4%
1970	2,032		29.2%
1980	2,066		1.7%
1990	2,138		3.5%
2000	2,471		15.6%
2010	2,274		−8.0%
2020	2,173		−4.4%
2025 (est.)	2,059	▼	−5.2%
U.S. Decennial Census

=== 2020 census ===
As of the 2020 census, Star City had a population of 2,173. The median age was 40.8 years. 23.5% of residents were under the age of 18 and 21.9% of residents were 65 years of age or older. For every 100 females there were 85.3 males, and for every 100 females age 18 and over there were 82.2 males age 18 and over.

All residents live in rural areas.

There were 833 households in Star City, of which 34.2% had children under the age of 18 living in them. Of all households, 38.1% were married-couple households, 18.8% were households with a male householder and no spouse or partner present, and 37.5% were households with a female householder and no spouse or partner present. About 33.4% of all households were made up of individuals and 15.3% had someone living alone who was 65 years of age or older.

There were 959 housing units, of which 13.1% were vacant. The homeowner vacancy rate was 3.4% and the rental vacancy rate was 7.3%.

Star City racial composition
Race	Number	Percentage
White (non-Hispanic)	1,561	71.84%
Black or African American (non-Hispanic)	402	18.5%
Native American	6	0.28%
Asian	8	0.37%
Pacific Islander	1	0.05%
Other/Mixed	120	5.52%
Hispanic or Latino	75	3.45%

=== 2000 census ===
As of the census of 2000, there were 2,471 people, 875 households, and 603 families residing in the city. The population density was 587.5 inhabitants per square mile (226.8/km^{2}). There were 972 housing units at an average density of 231.1 per square mile (89.2/km^{2}). The racial makeup of the city was 76.93% White, 21.08% Black or African American, 0.61% Native American, 0.04% from other races, and 0.77% from two or more races. 1.21% of the population were Hispanic or Latino of any race.

There were 875 households, out of which 37.4% had children under the age of 18 living with them, 46.5% were married couples living together, 18.6% had a female householder with no husband present, and 31.0% were non-families. 28.8% of all households were made up of individuals, and 15.8% had someone living alone who was 65 years of age or older. The average household size was 2.52 and the average family size was 3.10.

In the city, the population was spread out, with 27.0% under the age of 18, 7.9% from 18 to 24, 24.8% from 25 to 44, 17.5% from 45 to 64, and 22.9% who were 65 years of age or older. The median age was 38 years. For every 100 females, there were 75.4 males. For every 100 females age 18 and over, there were 69.8 males.

The median income for a household in the city was $32,197, and the median income for a family was $40,156. Males had a median income of $34,107 versus $19,630 for females. The per capita income for the city was $13,998. About 15.9% of families and 18.2% of the population were below the poverty line, including 27.0% of those under age 18 and 11.8% of those age 65 or over.

== Arts and culture ==
Star City was the setting for the 1992 police thriller film One False Move, starring actors Bill Paxton and Billy Bob Thornton, and written by Thornton. However, only limited filming was done there with the bulk of the movie shot in Cotton Plant, Arkansas.

=== Annual cultural events ===
Star City used to be the home of the annual STARDAZE festival. The festival used to draw people from all over southeastern Arkansas.

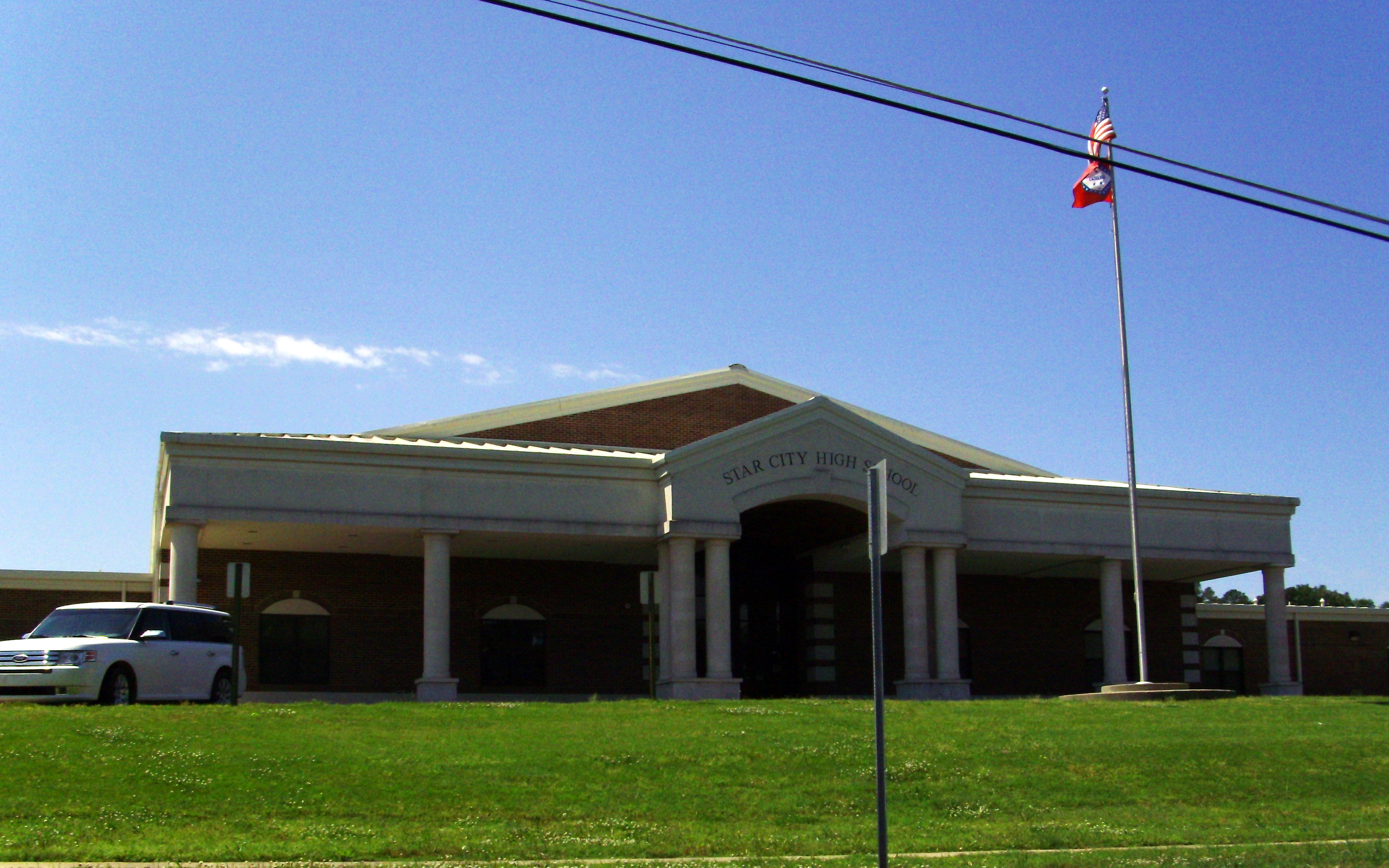
Star City High School

== Education ==
The Star City School District operates public schools: Jimmy Brown Elementary School, Star City Middle School, and Star City High School.

The Southeast Arkansas Public Library operates the Star City Branch Library.

== Infrastructure ==
=== Transportation ===
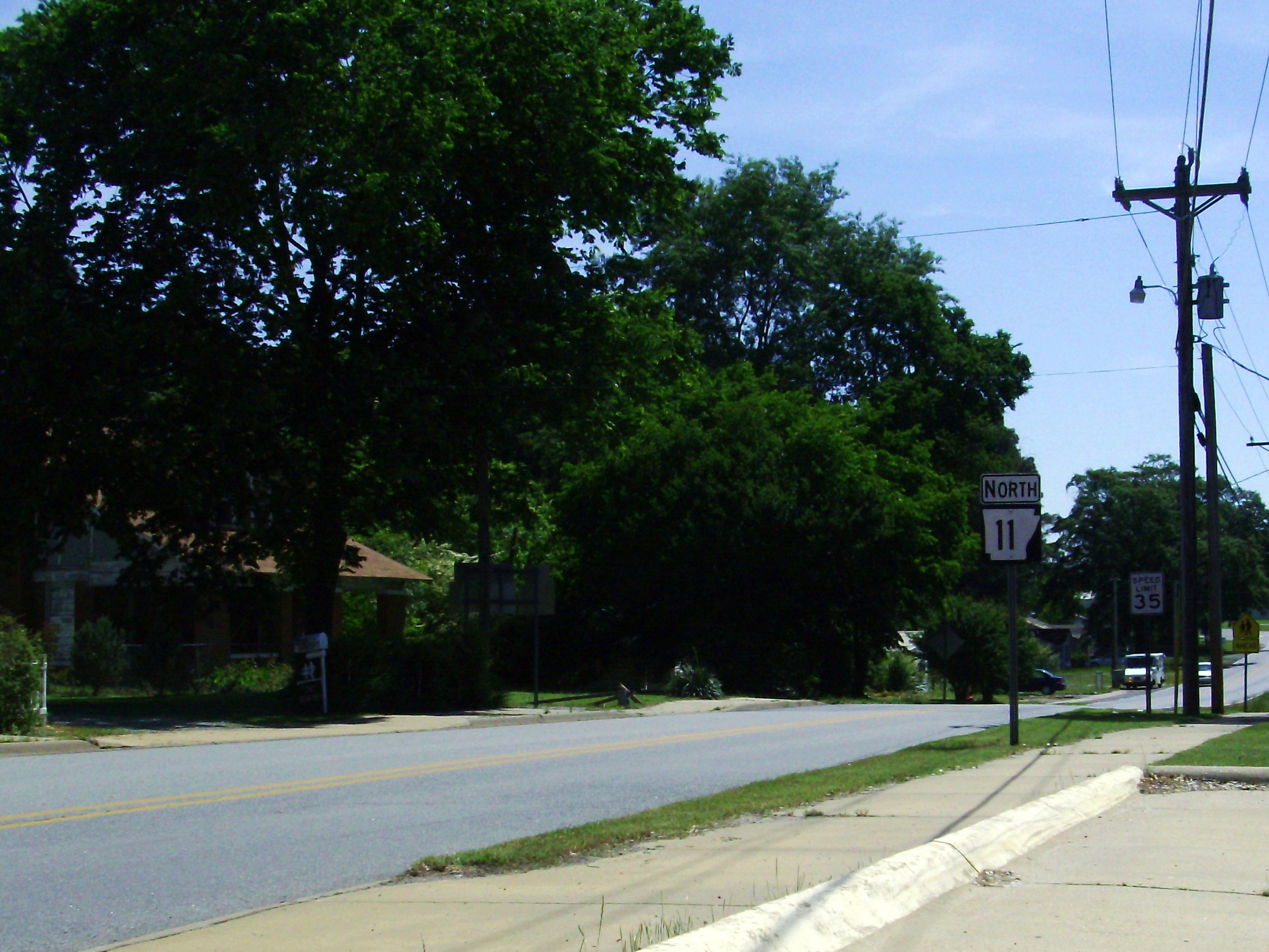
Highway 11 near the US 425 intersection in Star City

==== Roads ====
Star City is located at the intersection of US Highway 425 (US 425) and Highway 11 (AR 11). US 425 is a major north-south highway in southeast Arkansas and connects the city to Pine Bluff to the north and Monticello to the south. AR 11 provides access to Gould and US 65 to the east and US 63 to the west.

AR 530 currently terminates near Star City. This route is a two-lane freeway segment of a future extension of Interstate 530 (I-530) south to Monticello. In Monticello, the planned extension will connect to future Interstate 69, a proposed road connecting Port Huron, Michigan, and Rosenberg, Texas.
