= Crow House =

Crow House may refer to:

in the United States

(by state then city)

- Childers-Tate-Crow House, in the Summerfield District, Summerfield, Dallas County, Alabama
- Habicht-Cohn-Crow House, Arkadelphia, Arkansas
- Crow House (Star City, Arkansas)
- Oscar Crow House, Star City, Arkansas
- Crow–Hightower House, Eads, Colorado
- Crowe-Garritt House, Hanover, Indiana
- William Crow House, Bryantsville, Kentucky, listed on the National Register of Historic Places (NRHP)
- Crow-Barbee House, Danville, Kentucky, listed on the NRHP
- Judith Crow House, Cape Girardeau, Missouri
- Henry Varnum Poor House, also known as Crow House, New City, New York
