= William Vaughn =

William Vaughn may refer to:

- William J. Vaughn, American university professor, librarian and book collector
- William S. Vaughn (1903–1996), president and CEO of Eastman Kodak
- Billy Vaughn, singer
- Bill Vaughn, a fictional CIA agent from the American TV series Alias, father of main character Michael Vaughn

== See also ==
- William Vaughan (disambiguation)
