= Kappa Alpha =

Kappa Alpha may refer to:

- Kappa Alpha Order, an American college fraternity, founded 1865 at Washington College
- Kappa Alpha Society, an American fraternity, founded 1825 at Union College
- Kuklos Adelphon, known as Old Kappa Alpha or Kappa Alpha, an American college fraternity, founded at the University of North Carolina
