= Kuklos Adelphon =

American collegiate fraternity (1812–1866)

- ΚΑ
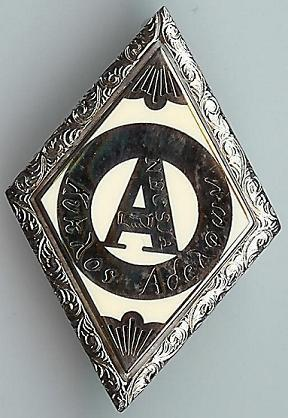
- Fraternity badge
- Founded: 1812; 214 years ago University of North Carolina at Chapel Hill
- Type: Social
- Former affiliation: Independent
- Status: Defunct
- Defunct date: 1866
- Scope: National
- Motto: Nil ego contulerim sanus jucundo amico "Nothing can I prefer, when sane, to a companionable friend"
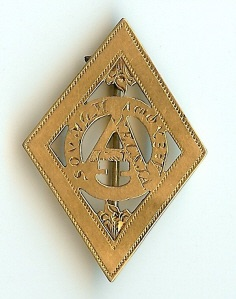
- Member badge: Badge, circa 1850s
- Chapters: 21
- Nickname: Old Kappa Alpha, K.A., Circle of Brothers, and Alpha Society
- Headquarters: United States

Kuklos Adelphon (also known as Kappa Alpha or ΚΑ) was an American social fraternity founded at the University of North Carolina in 1812. It was also known as old Kappa Alpha, K.A., Circle of Brothers, and the Alpha Society. The organization expanded throughout the Southern United States, not only on college campuses but also in cities where alumni settled. The society began to decline during the 1850s and disappeared after the Civil War.

== History ==
Kuklos Adelphon was established at the University of North Carolina in Chapel Hill in 1812. Its founders were four members of Phi Beta Kappa. As a result, its rituals, secrets, and constitution were similar to Phi Beta Kappa.

Kuklos Adelphon expanded throughout the Southern United States, not only on college campuses but also in cities where alumni settled. It did not have a centralized operation and allowed each chapter to amend its constitution and ritual as desired by its members.

In the spring of 1855, secessionist politics caused a rift at the University of Alabama. The minority unionist faction of the chapter disclosed the secrets of the order which were published by another fraternity, leading to the chapter's dissolution.

The Alpha chapter of Kuklos Adelphon dissolved in 1855 but was revived in 1858 as Kappa Alpha.

In 1858, the chapter at the University of South Carolina led a reorganization of the order and it was reconstituted as Phi Mu Omicron (ΦΜΟ) but this order did not outlast the Civil War. The last Kappa Alpha chapter proper, that at the University of North Carolina, dissolved in 1866.

== Symbols and traditions ==
The fraternity's name is derived from Ancient Greek Κύκλος Ἀδελφών, meaning "Circle of Brothers." Its motto was Nil ego contulerim sanus jucundo amico or "Nothing can I prefer, when sane, to a companionable friend", which is a quote from the poet Horace.

Its badge was a diamond with a circle in its center. There was a capital letter A inside the circle and the phrase Κύκλος Ἀδελφών around the outside of the circle. The initials of the fraternity's Latin motto, NECSJA, were on the right leg of the letter A, while an image of clasping hands was on the crossbar of the letter A. The badge was supposed to be worn suspended from a blue ribbon from the member's right lapel. The constitution specified that the badge was to be silver; however, examples in other metals are also found. Variations (pictured here) include the circle and letter A in black enamel on a white enamel background, or a diamond frame with a circle frame.

The fraternity's seal was an equilateral triangle, with the Greek letters ΚΑ below and an open eye above.

== Chapters ==
Chapters of the society were called circles. If chapters were named in order of the Greek alphabet, there were 21 collegiate chapters established. However, the order in which the chapters were chartered is unknown. Following is a list of Kuklos Adelphon or Kappa Alpha chapters that were active in 1855.

Chapter	Charter date and range	Institution	Location	Status	Ref.
Alpha	1812–1855, 1858–1866	University of North Carolina	Chapel Hill, North Carolina	Inactive	(Note: When the chapter dissolved in 1855, most of its members joined Chi Psi. It was revived as Kappa Alpha.)
Delta	18xx ?–1861	Furman University	Greenville, South Carolina	Inactive	
Epsilon	18xx ?–1861	South Carolina University	Columbia, South Carolina	Withdrew (ΦΜΟ)	(Note: Chapter withdrew and reorganized as Phi Mu Omicron fraternity. However, the new organization did not survive the Civil War.)
	1842–1855	LaGrange College	Colbert County, Alabama	Moved	(Note: The LaGrange chapter moved in the spring of 1855 when LaGrange became a military academy and its literary department moved to Florence Wesleyan.)
	1848–1855	University of Alabama	Tuscaloosa, Alabama	Withdrew (ΦΛΔ)	(Note: Chapter withdrew and became a chapter of Phi Gamma Delta in the fall of 1855.)
Lambda	1855–January 1858	Centenary College of Louisiana	Shreveport, Louisiana	Withdrew (ΔΚΕ)	(Note: Chapter withdrew and joined Delta Kappa Epsilon.)
	1855–1861	Florence Wesleyan University	Florence, Alabama	Inactive	
	1855–1858	University of Mississippi	University, Mississippi	Withdrew (ΧΨ)	(Note: Chapter withdrew and joined Chi Psi in the fall of 1858.)
	18xx ?–1861	Wofford College	Spartanburg, South Carolina	Withdrew (ΦΜΟ)	
	18xx ?–1861	Union University	Jackson, Tennessee	Inactive	
	18xx ?–1861	Howard College	Homewood, Alabama	Inactive	
	18xx ?–1861	Centenary Institute	Summerfield, Alabama	Inactive	
		University of Georgia	Athens, Georgia	Inactive	
	18xx ?–1861	Emory College	DeKalb County, Georgia	Withdrew (ΦΜΟ)	
		Centre College	Danville, Kentucky	Inactive	
		Western Military Institute	Nashville, Tennessee	Inactive	
		College of William & Mary	Williamsburg, Virginia	Inactive	
		Washington College	Lexington, Virginia	Inactive	
Omicron	185x ?–1861	Louisiana College	Convent, Louisiana	Inactive	
Phi	185x ?–1861	Emory and Henry College	Emory, Virginia	Withdrew (ΦΜΟ)	(Note: The chapter withdrew and joined Phi Mu Omicron. It went dormant during the Civil War.)

== Controversies ==
John Lester, a founder of the Ku Klux Klan, claimed that the Klan's initiation ritual was based on a popular collegiate fraternal order, and it has been speculated by Allen Trelease that "Kuklos Adelphon almost certainly provided the model" for the early Klan. In disagreement, Albert Stevens in his Cyclopaedia of Fraternities (1907), a more contemporary reference document to the date for the founding, declares the Klan took portions from the initiation ceremony of the Sons of Malta and leaves absent the name "Kuklos Adelphon."

== Notable members ==
- John C. Bush, mayor of Mobile, Alabama
- Wiliam Wallace Duncan, Bishop of the Methodist Episcopal Church, South
- Robert Kennon Hargrove, Bishop of the Methodist Episcopal Church, South
- William M. Lowe, U.S. House of Representatives
- John Mason Martin, U.S. House of Representatives
- James K. Polk, President of the United States
- Thomas R. Stockdale, justice of the Supreme Court of Mississippi and U.S. House of Representatives
- William H. Whitsitt, president of Southern Baptist Theological Seminary
