= National Register of Historic Places listings in Lincoln County, Arkansas =

Location of Lincoln County in Arkansas

This is a list of the National Register of Historic Places listings in Lincoln County, Arkansas.

This is intended to be a complete list of the properties and districts on the National Register of Historic Places in Lincoln County, Arkansas, United States. The locations of National Register properties and districts for which the latitude and longitude coordinates are included below, may be seen in a map.

There are 9 properties and districts listed on the National Register in the county, and one former listing.

Contents: Counties in Arkansas
- Arkansas
- Ashley
- Baxter
- Benton
- Boone
- Bradley
- Calhoun
- Carroll
- Chicot
- Clark
- Clay
- Cleburne
- Cleveland
- Columbia
- Conway
- Craighead
- Crawford
- Crittenden
- Cross
- Dallas
- Desha
- Drew
- Faulkner
- Franklin
- Fulton
- Garland
- Grant
- Greene
- Hempstead
- Hot Spring
- Howard
- Independence
- Izard
- Jackson
- Jefferson
- Johnson
- Lafayette
- Lawrence
- Lee
- Lincoln
- Little River
- Logan
- Lonoke
- Madison
- Marion
- Miller
- Mississippi
- Monroe
- Montgomery
- Nevada
- Newton
- Ouachita
- Perry
- Phillips
- Pike
- Poinsett
- Polk
- Pope
- Prairie
- Pulaski (Little Rock)
- Randolph
- St. Francis
- Saline
- Scott
- Searcy
- Sebastian
- Sevier
- Sharp
- Stone
- Union
- Van Buren
- Washington
- White
- Woodruff
- Yell

This National Park Service list is complete through NPS recent listings posted December 19, 2025.

== Current listings ==
	Name on the Register	Image	Date listed	Location	City or town	Description
1	Crow House	Crow House	June 29, 1976 (#76000426)	7 miles southeast of Star City; 33°54′00″N 91°50′58″W	Star City	
2	Oscar Crow House	Oscar Crow House	October 8, 1992 (#92001343)	404 Washington St. 33°56′20″N 91°50′50″W	Star City	
3	Cummins Prison Chapel		April 30, 2024 (#100010309)	2540 Highway 388; 34°03′12″N 91°35′03″W	Grady	
4	Lincoln County Courthouse	Lincoln County Courthouse	March 7, 1994 (#94000141)	300 S. Drew St. 33°56′22″N 91°50′40″W	Star City	
5	Mt. Zion Presbyterian Church	Mt. Zion Presbyterian Church	January 21, 1988 (#87002496)	Highway 81; 33°47′31″N 91°50′19″W	Relfs Bluff	
6	Parker House	Parker House	June 2, 2000 (#00000607)	HC 64 Box 5; 33°54′53″N 91°50′50″W	Star City	
7	Rice Family Cemetery	Rice Family Cemetery	May 29, 2003 (#03000464)	Junction of U.S. Route 65 and Highway 388; 34°02′34″N 91°36′44″W	Varner	
8	Star City Commercial Historic District	Star City Commercial Historic District	February 26, 1999 (#99000152)	Roughly along Jefferson and Bradley Sts. 33°56′30″N 91°50′44″W	Star City	
9	Star City Confederate Memorial	Star City Confederate Memorial	April 26, 1996 (#96000448)	Southwestern corner of the Star City Town Sq. 33°56′30″N 91°50′45″W	Star City	

== Former listings ==
	Name on the Register	Image	Date listed	Date removed	Location	City or town	Description
1	Charles Hampton Tracy House	Charles Hampton Tracy House	January 24, 2011 (#10001156)	January 4, 2021	2794 Blair Rd. 34°03′05″N 91°46′42″W	Star City vicinity	

== See also ==
- List of National Historic Landmarks in Arkansas
- National Register of Historic Places listings in Arkansas
