= List of Kappa Alpha Order chapters =

Kappa Alpha Order is a social fraternity and a fraternal order founded in 1865 at Washington and Lee University. Chapter names were often reused in the early decades of the fraternity, and the final successor group normally goes by the shortened name, for example Mu chapter at Tulsa is the fourth to carry that name. Commissions first appeared in 1915, empowered to elect and initiate graduates of military institutions. Commissions can be established to replace a previously active chapter or at a four-year military institution, or in the case of Omega, used for both Centre graduates and for general legacy election. Where an active chapter is re-established, the commission at that school is deactivated.

In the following list of chapters, active chapters are indicated in bold and inactive chapters are in italics.

Chapter	Charter date and range	Institution	City	State	Status	Ref.
**Alpha**	December 21, 1865 – 1870; 1875–1878; 1883–1970, 1977–199x ?; xxxx ?	Washington and Lee University	Lexington	Virginia	Active	
Beta first	March 8, 1868 – 1913; 1915	Virginia Military Institute	Lexington	Virginia	Commission	(Note: The Order's first commission was placed at VMI in 1915 when Academy rules determined active fraternity chapters would no longer be allowed to continue. Alumni-led, commissions appoint membership into ΚΑ for graduating seniors and graduates of the institution, faculty, and staff. The fraternity considers these members equivalent to those who joined through a collegiate chapter.)
**Gamma**	April 6, 1868 – 1874, 1879	University of Georgia	Athens	Georgia	Active	
**Delta**	February 23, 1869 – 1909, 1915	Wofford College	Spartanburg	South Carolina	Active	
**Epsilon**	June 4, 1869 – 2015; 2019	Emory University	Atlanta	Georgia	Active	
**Eta**	March 18, 1870	University of Richmond	Richmond	Virginia	Active	
**Zeta**	November 26, 1870 – 20xx ?; November 14, 2019	Randolph–Macon College	Ashland	Virginia	Active	
Theta Prime (see Beta Nu)	December 25, 1870 – 1873	Oglethorpe University	Brookhaven	Georgia	Inactive	
Iota / **Iota Commission**	May 8, 1872 – 1875, 1879–1898, 1927–1963, 1984–2020	Furman University	Greenville	South Carolina	Commission	
**Kappa**	November 8, 1873	Mercer University	Macon	Georgia	Active	
Lambda	November 18, 1873 – 1882; 1886–2022	University of Virginia	Charlottesville	Virginia	Inactive	
Mu Prime (see **Delta Epsilon**)	November 26, 1873 – 1874	Newberry College	Newberry	South Carolina	Inactive	
Nu Prime	November 22, 1877 – 1878	Pennsylvania College of Dental Surgery	Philadelphia	Pennsylvania	Inactive	(Note: The Pennsylvania College of Dental Surgery closed in 1909.)
Xi Prime (see **Epsilon Eta**)	April 8, 1877 – 1878	Virginia Tech	Blacksburg	Virginia	Inactive	(Note: Revived as Epsilon Eta chapter in 1979.)
Omicron Prime	October 1878–1879	Bethel Military Academy	Warrenton	Virginia	Inactive	(Note: Bethel Academy (Bethel Military Academy) of Virginia closed in 1911.)
Pi Prime	April 18, 1879 – 1883	Gordon Institute (now Gordon State College)	Barnesville	Georgia	Inactive	
**Rho**	December 11, 1880 – 1892; 1895–1897; 1927	University of South Carolina	Columbia	South Carolina	Active	
Sigma	February 18, 1880 – 2021	Davidson College	Davidson	North Carolina	Inactive	
**Tau**	February 18, 1880	Wake Forest University	Winston-Salem	North Carolina	Active	
**Upsilon**	November 25, 1881 – 1888; 1891	University of North Carolina	Chapel Hill	North Carolina	Active	
**Psi**	January 14, 1882 – 1883; 1886	Tulane University	New Orleans	Louisiana	Active	
**Phi**	January 17, 1882 – 1914; 1922–1974; 1980	Birmingham–Southern College	Birmingham	Alabama	Active	
**Chi**	April 9, 1883 – 199x ?; 2004–2012; 2018	Vanderbilt University	Nashville	Tennessee	Active	(Note: Reformed as a colony in 2003 and 2015.)
**Xi Second**	November 28, 1883 – 200x ?; 2004	Southwestern University	Georgetown	Texas	Active	
Omega / **Omega Commission**	September 12, 1883 – 1933; August 16, 2011	Centre College	Danville	Kentucky	Commission	
Theta Second / **Theta Commission**	October 1, 1883 – 1890; October 3, 2008	The Citadel	Charleston	South Carolina	Commission	(Note: The Theta Commission re-established a fraternity presence at The Citadel in 2008.)
Mu Second	November 14, 1883 – 1893	Erskine College	Due West	South Carolina	Inactive	
**Nu Second**	November 24, 1883	Auburn University	Auburn	Alabama	Active	
**Omicron Second**	October 5, 1883 – 1887; 1891–2000; 201x ?	University of Texas at Austin	Austin	Texas	Active	
**Pi Second**	December 1, 1883 – 1887; 1893–2002; 2009–2020; 2026	University of Tennessee	Knoxville	Tennessee	Active	
**Alpha Alpha**	December 1, 1883	Sewanee: The University of the South	Sewanee	Tennessee	Active	
**Alpha Beta**	June 17, 1885	University of Alabama	Tuscaloosa	Alabama	Active	
**Alpha Gamma**	July 2, 1885	Louisiana State University	Baton Rouge	Louisiana	Active	
**Alpha Delta**	January 26, 1887	William Jewell College	Liberty	Missouri	Active	
Alpha Epsilon	November 16, 1887 – 1904; 1925–2022	Rhodes College	Memphis	Tennessee	Inactive	(Note: Chapter was reformed in 1925 by absorbing Sigma Sigma Kappa, established in 1920.)
**Alpha Zeta**	January 3, 1890	College of William & Mary	Williamsburg	Virginia	Active	
**Alpha Eta**	January 28, 1890	Westminster College	Fulton	Missouri	Active	(Note: Chapter formed by absorbing Chi Beta Delta (local), established in 1887.)
**Alpha Theta**	April 9, 1891	Transylvania University	Lexington	Kentucky	Active	
**Alpha Iota**	September 14, 1891 – 1903; 1909–1913; 1922	Centenary College of Louisiana	Shreveport	Louisiana	Active	(Note: Alpha Iota chapter formed by absorbing Delta Sigma Phi (local), established in 1891 or earlier. It was reformed in 1922 by absorbing Alpha Kappa Pi (local), established in 1922. An earlier, unaffiliated circle (~chapter) of the original Kappa Alpha (Kuklos Adelphon) was on the Centenary campus circa 1855, lasting until 1858 or 1861, but did not survive the Civil War.)
**Alpha Kappa**	September 30, 1891 – 2016; 2021	University of Missouri	Columbia	Missouri	Active	
Alpha Lambda	October 21, 1891 – 1910; 1915–1973	Johns Hopkins University	Baltimore	Maryland	Inactive	
**Theta**	February 21, 1893	University of Kentucky	Lexington	Kentucky	Active	
**Alpha Mu**	October 1, 1893	Millsaps College	Jackson	Mississippi	Active	
Mu Third	December 21, 1893 – 1895	Emory and Henry College	Emory	Virginia	Inactive	
Alpha Nu	November 18, 1894 – 1953; 1956–1959; 2008–2021	George Washington University	Washington	District of Columbia	Inactive	
**Alpha Xi**	March 6, 1895 – 1896; 1897–1970; 1979–199x ?; 20xx ?	University of California, Berkeley	Berkeley	California	Active	
**Alpha Omicron**	April 27, 1895 – 1902; 1904–1960; 1987–2005; 2013	University of Arkansas	Fayetteville	Arkansas	Active	
**Alpha Pi**	October 27, 1895 – 1899; 1903	Stanford University	Stanford	California	Active	
Alpha Rho	March 10, 1897 – 2021	West Virginia University	Morgantown	West Virginia	Inactive	
**Alpha Sigma**	October 21, 1899	Georgia Tech	Atlanta	Georgia	Active	
**Alpha Tau**	December 6, 1899	Hampden–Sydney College	Hampden Sydney	Virginia	Active	
**Alpha Upsilon**	January 12, 1900 – 1912, 1926	University of Mississippi	Oxford	Mississippi	Active	
**Alpha Phi**	October 18, 1901 – 1970, 1979	Duke University	Durham	North Carolina	Active	
Alpha Chi	March 28, 1902 – 1907	Kentucky Wesleyan College	Owensboro	Kentucky	Inactive	
Alpha Psi Prime (see **Gamma Eta**)	February 11, 1903 – 1905	Florida State University	Tallahassee	Florida	Inactive	
**Alpha Omega**	January 30, 1903 – 2005; 2011	North Carolina State University	Raleigh	North Carolina	Active	
**Beta Alpha**	April 28, 1903	Missouri University of Science and Technology	Rolla	Missouri	Active	
Beta Beta	June 12, 1903 – 20xx ?	Bethany College	Bethany	West Virginia	Inactive	(Note: Beta Beta chapter formed by absorbing Alpha Phi (local), established in 1902.)
**Beta Gamma**	January 15, 1904 – 1939; 1976–200x ?; 2005–2016; 2020	College of Charleston	Charleston	South Carolina	Active	
Beta Delta	February 11, 1904 – 1920; 1925–2020	Georgetown College	Georgetown	Kentucky	Inactive	(Note: Chapter reformed in 1925 by absorbing the Squirrel Club, established in 1922.)
**Beta Epsilon**	April 29, 1904 – 199x ?; 2004–2019, 2024-	University of Delaware	Newark	Delaware	Active	
**Beta Zeta**	October 22, 1904	University of Florida	Gainesville	Florida	Active	
**Beta Eta**	November 17, 1905 – 2018; 2023 -	University of Oklahoma	Norman	Oklahoma	Active	(Note: Beta Eta chapter formed by absorbing the local Phi Kappa Chi, established in 1904.)
Beta Theta	May 7, 1906 – 1965	Washington University in St. Louis	St. Louis	Missouri	Inactive	
**Beta Iota**	April 27, 1907	Drury University	Springfield	Missouri	Active	(Note: Beta Iota chapter formed by absorbing the local Kappa Tau, established in 1900.)
**Beta Kappa**	September 12, 1914	University of Maryland	College Park	Maryland	Active	(Note: Chapter was formed by absorbing Alpha Phi, established in 1913.)
Beta Lambda	December 6, 1916 – 2009; 2011–2017	Southern Methodist University	Dallas	Texas	Inactive	(Note: Chapter formed by absorbing Alpha Kappa Club. It was reformed as a colony in 2010.)
Beta Mu	December 16, 1915 – 1942	St. John's College	Annapolis	Maryland	Inactive	(Note: Chapter formed by absorbing Phi Mu Theta, established in 1914.)
Beta Nu (see Theta Prime)	December 1, 1918 – 1938; 1976–20xx ?	Oglethorpe University	Brookhaven	Georgia	Inactive	(Note: Beta Nu chapter was a re-establishment of the Theta Prime chapter which went dormant in 1873. This chapter was reformed in 1976 by absorbing Beta Nu (local), established in 1967.)
**Beta Xi**	March 16, 1920 – 1972; 1992	Oklahoma State University–Stillwater	Stillwater	Oklahoma	Active	(Note: Chapter was formed as a colony in 1900. It reformed in 1991 as a colony.)
Beta Omicron	June 25, 1921 – 1960	University of Louisville	Louisville	Kentucky	Inactive	(Note: Chapter was formed by absorbing the Abbott’s Society (local), established in 1920.)
**Beta Pi**	December 29, 1923	Presbyterian College	Clinton, South Carolina	South Carolina	Active	(Note: Chapter was formed by absorbing the Aesir Club (local), established in 1921.)
**Beta Rho**	February 1, 1924 – 1982; 1968	Roanoke College	Salem	Virginia	Active	(Note: Chapter was formed by absorbing Omega Beta Chi (local), established in 1914. Later, the chapter absorbed Chi Delta Kappa. It reformed as a colony in 1987.)
**Beta Sigma**	May 21, 1926 – 1990; 20xx ?–2017; 2023	University of Southern California	Los Angeles	California	Active	(Note: Chapter formed by absorbing Phi Alpha (local), established between 1896 and 1898.)
**Beta Upsilon**	September 13, 1927 – 1982; 2001	Marshall University	Huntington	West Virginia	Active	(Note: Chapter was formed by absorbing Zeta Phi, established in 1922. It reformed as a colony in 1999.)
**Beta Tau**	December 3, 1927	Mississippi State University	Starkville	Mississippi	Active	(Note: Chapter formed by absorbing the local group, Lee Guards, established in 1885.)
Alpha Psi Second	December 12, 1927 – 1986	Rollins College	Winter Park	Florida	Inactive	(Note: Chapter formed by absorbing the local Phi Alpha, established in 1904.)
Beta Phi	September 27, 1929 – 1979	University of New Mexico	Albuquerque	New Mexico	Inactive	(Note: Chapter formed by absorbing Omega Rho (local), established in 1923.)
**Beta Chi**	December 18, 1929	West Virginia Wesleyan College	Buckhannon	West Virginia	Active	(Note: Chapter was formed by absorbing Alpha Gamma Phi, established in 1924.)
Beta Psi	May 22, 1931 – 1953; 1956–1960	University of California, Los Angeles	Los Angeles	California	Inactive	(Note: Chapter was formed by absorbing Lambda Kappa Tau, established in 1921. It reformed as a colony in 1956.)
Beta Omega	March 7, 1936 – 2020	Washington College	Chestertown	Maryland	Inactive	(Note: Chapter was formed by absorbing Alpha Kappa, established in 1920.)
**Mu**	May 8, 1937	University of Tulsa	Tulsa	Oklahoma	Active	(Note: This chapter was formed by absorbing Delta Alpha (local), established in 1926.)
**Gamma Alpha**	October 5, 1947	Louisiana Tech University	Ruston	Louisiana	Active	(Note: This chapter was formed by absorbing the Pentagon Club, established in 1946.)
**Gamma Beta**	November 5, 1947 – 2014; 2017	Missouri State University	Springfield	Missouri	Colony	
**Gamma Gamma**	October 2, 1948 – 199x ?; 200x ?	University of Memphis	Memphis	Tennessee	Active	(Note: Chapter was established by absorbing Phi Delta Sigma (local), established in 1924 or 1929.)
Gamma Delta	October 16, 1948 – 1959	San Jose State University	San Jose	California	Inactive	(Note: Chapter was formed by absorbing Chi Delta Phi, established in 1946.)
**Gamma Epsilon**	January 8, 1949 – 1969; 1986–2008; 2013	University of Arizona	Tucson	Arizona	Active	(Note: Chapter was formed by absorbing Kappa Alpha Alpha (local), established in 1947. It reformed as a colony in 1984 and 2011.)
Gamma Zeta	January 9, 1949 – 2010	University of Southern Mississippi	Hattiesburg	Mississippi	Inactive	(Note: Chapter formed by absorbing the Southern Club, established in 1946.)
**Gamma Eta** (see Alpha Psi Prime)	March 5, 1949	Florida State University	Tallahassee	Florida	Active	(Note: Chapter was formed by absorbing the local club, Kuklas Adelphan, established in 1947.)
Gamma Theta	May 6, 1950 – 1963	University of Miami	Coral Gables	Florida	Inactive	
**Gamma Iota**	October 15, 1950 – 1961; 1993–2009; 2014	San Diego State University	San Diego	California	Active	(Note: Chapter was formed by absorbing Omega Xi (local), established in 1926. Reformed as a colony in 1991 and 2013.)
Gamma Kappa	May 18, 1952 – 2007	Oklahoma City University	Oklahoma City	Oklahoma	Inactive	(Note: Chapter was formed by absorbing Delta Psi Omega, established in 1920.)
**Gamma Lambda**	October 4, 1953 – 2001; 2018	University of North Texas	Denton	Texas	Active	(Note: Chapter formed by absorbing the local club, Talons, established in 1927. Reformed as a colony in 2016.)
**Gamma Mu**	February 5, 1956 – 1960; 1970 – 1997; 2013	University of Houston	Houston	Texas	Active	(Note: Chapter formed by absorbing Phi Delta Tau, established in 1949. It was reformed in 1970 by absorbing Delta Tau, established in 1968. Reformed as a colony in 2011.)
**Gamma Xi**	March 10, 1957 – 1970; 199x ?	Lamar University	Beaumont	Texas	Active	(Note: Chapter formed by absorbing Phi Delta, established in 1955.)
Gamma Omicron	November 8, 1957 – 2010	Lambuth University	Jackson	Tennessee	Inactive	(Note: Chapter formed by absorbing Kappa Phi Epsilon (local), established in 1930.)
**Gamma Nu**	December 9, 1957	University of Louisiana at Monroe	Monroe	Louisiana	Active	(Note: Chapter was formed by absorbing Sigma Alpha Chi, established in 1950.)
Gamma Pi	May 11, 1958 – 201x ?	Florida Southern College	Lakeland	Florida	Inactive	
**Gamma Rho**	September 25, 1958	East Carolina University	Greenville	North Carolina	Active	(Note: Chapter was formed by absorbing Sigma Rho Alpha (local), established in 1953.)
**Gamma Sigma**	October 23, 1959	West Texas A&M University	Canyon	Texas	Active	(Note: Chapter was formed by absorbing Alpha Sigma Xi (local), established in 1934.)
**Gamma Tau**	March 5, 1960 – 20xx ?; 2016	Sam Houston State University	Huntsville	Texas	Active	(Note: Chapter formed by absorbing the local club, Ravens, established in 1949. Reformed as a colony in 2013.)
**Gamma Phi**	December 2, 1960	University of Louisiana at Lafayette	Lafayette	Louisiana	Active	(Note: Chapter formed by absorbing Alpha Sigma Kappa, established in 1930.)
Gamma Upsilon	December 18, 1960 – 2016	East Texas A&M University	Commerce	Texas	Inactive	(Note: Chapter formed by absorbing the local group, Paragon, established in 1939.) (Note: Texas A&M University at Commerce changed its name to East Texas A&M University on 7 November 2024.)
**Gamma Chi**	September 22, 1961	Texas Tech University	Lubbock	Texas	Active	
**Gamma Psi**	March 15, 1963	Northwestern State University	Natchitoches	Louisiana	Active	(Note: Chapter formed by absorbing the local group, Kuklos Adelphia, established in 1959. This local was unrelated to the long-dormant and similarly-named Kuklos Adelphon, whose last chapter died out circa 1866.)
Gamma Omega	March 6, 1964 – 2008; 201x ?–20xx ?	Midwestern State University	Wichita Falls	Texas	Inactive	
**Delta Alpha**	October 2, 1964 – 2017; 2023	Western Carolina University	Cullowhee	North Carolina	Active	(Note: Chapter formed by absorbing Kappa Alpha Pi, established in 1963.)
**Delta Beta**	November 14, 1964	Delta State University	Cleveland	Mississippi	Active	(Note: Chapter formed by absorbing Delta Alpha Omega, established in 1960.)
Delta Gamma	March 12, 1965 – 1992; 2016–2022	Old Dominion University	Norfolk	Virginia	Inactive	(Note: Chapter formed by absorbing the local group, The Imps, established in 1930. It reformed as a colony in 2014.)
Delta Delta	April 26, 1966 – 1987	East Tennessee State University	Johnson City	Tennessee	Inactive	(Note: This chapter was formed by absorbing Delta Chi Alpha, established in 1964.)
**Delta Epsilon** (see Mu Prime)	May 14, 1966	Newberry College	Newberry	South Carolina	Active	(Note: Chapter formed by absorbing Kappa Phi.)
Delta Zeta	January 1, 1967 – 1970	Spring Hill College	Mobile	Alabama	Inactive	(Note: Chapter formed by absorbing Omicron Sigma, established in 1915.)
**Delta Eta**	October 13, 1967	Arkansas State University	Jonesboro	Arkansas	Active	(Note: Chapter formed by absorbing the local group, the Statesmen, established in 1964.)
**Delta Theta**	March 29, 1968	Georgia Southern University	Statesboro	Georgia	Active	(Note: Chapter was formed by absorbing Sigma Epsilon Chi, established in 1965.)
**Delta Iota**	April 26, 1968 – 200x ?; 2014	University of Texas at Arlington	Arlington	Texas	Active	(Note: Chapter formed by absorbing Tau Delta Tau, established in 1964. It reformed as a colony in 2012.)
**Delta Kappa**	September 20, 1968	Stephen F. Austin State University	Nacogdoches	Texas	Active	(Note: The chapter was formed by absorbing Beta Gamma Tau, established in 1966.)
**Delta Lambda**	February 15, 1969 – 2014, 2020	Middle Tennessee State University	Murfreesboro	Tennessee	Active	(Note: This chapter was formed by absorbing Phi Epsilon, established in 1961. It reformed as a colony in 2018.)
**Delta Mu**	February 14, 1969	Eastern Kentucky University	Richmond	Kentucky	Active	(Note: The chapter was formed by absorbing Gamma Delta Tau, established in 1966.)
**Delta Nu**	March 14, 1969 – 1994; 2005–2008; 2018	Murray State University	Murray	Kentucky	Active	(Note: Chapter formed by absorbing Alpha Kappa Alpha, established in 1968. It reformed as a colony in 2003.)
**Delta Xi**	October 24, 1969	McNeese State University	Lake Charles	Louisiana	Active	(Note: Chapter formed by absorbing Kappa Alpha Epsilon, established in 1968.)
**Delta Omicron**	February 21, 1970	Clemson University	Clemson	South Carolina	Active	(Note: Chapter was formed by establishing Phi Kappa Delta (local), established in 1959.)
**Delta Pi**	October 15, 1971 – 1986; 1992	Missouri Southern State University	Joplin	Missouri	Active	(Note: Chapter was formed by absorbing Pi Beta Lambda, established in 1969. It reformed as a colony in 1990.)
**Delta Rho**	November 20, 1972	Valdosta State University	Valdosta	Georgia	Active	(Note: Chapter formed by absorbing the Knights of Arlington, established in 1970.)
Delta Sigma	April 29, 1972 – 1992; 2004–2015	Houston Baptist University (now Houston Christian University)	Houston	Texas	Inactive	(Note: Chapter reformed in 2004 by absorbing Kappa Alpha Omicron, established in 2001.)
**Delta Tau**	March 22, 1974	Francis Marion University	Florence	South Carolina	Active	(Note: Chapter was established by absorbing Kappa Sigma Nu, established in 1969.)
**Delta Upsilon**	January 31, 1975	University of Tennessee at Martin	Martin	Tennessee	Active	(Note: Chapter was formed by absorbing Kappa Alpha Kappa, established in 1972.)
**Delta Phi**	January 23, 1976	Jacksonville State University	Jacksonville	Alabama	Active	
Delta Chi	February 7, 1976 – 1989	Louisiana State University Shreveport	Shreveport	Louisiana	Inactive	
**Delta Psi**	April 25, 1976	Appalachian State University	Boone	North Carolina	Active	(Note: Chapter was formed by absorbing Pi Kappa, established in 1971.)
**Delta Omega**	September 18, 1976 – 1993; 199x ?–2003; 2017	Baylor University	Waco	Texas	Active	(Note: Chapter was formed by absorbing Sigma Tau Epsilon, established in 1967. It was reformed as a colony in 2016.)
**Epsilon Alpha**	January 15, 1977	University of South Alabama	Mobile	Alabama	Active	
**Epsilon Beta**	February 4, 1977	Nicholls State University	Thibodaux	Louisiana	Active	
Epsilon Gamma	April 15, 1977 – 199x ?	University of California, Davis	Davis, California	California	Inactive	
**Epsilon Delta**	January 27, 1978	Texas A&M University	College Station	Texas	Active	
Epsilon Epsilon	March 3, 1979 – 20xx ?	University of California, Riverside	Riverside	California	Inactive	
**Epsilon Zeta**	April 7, 1979 – 200x ?; 2017	Arkansas Tech University	Russellville	Arkansas	Active	(Note: Chapter formed by absorbing Phi Sigma Rho, established in the 1970s. It reformed as a colony in 2016.)
**Epsilon Eta** (see Xi Prime)	October 7, 1979	Virginia Tech	Blacksburg	Virginia	Active	
**Epsilon Theta**	January 12, 1979	Western Kentucky University	Bowling Green	Kentucky	Active	
Epsilon Iota	December 7, 1979 – 2017	Texas State University	San Marcos	Texas	Inactive	
**Epsilon Kappa**	January 18, 1980	Southeastern Louisiana University	Hammond	Louisiana	Active	
Epsilon Lambda	April 10, 1981	Miami University	Oxford	Ohio	Inactive	
**Epsilon Mu**	January 22, 1982	Elon University	Elon	North Carolina	Active	(Note: Chapter was formed by absorbing Kappa Psi Nu, established in 1921.)
**Epsilon Nu**	September 18, 1982	Georgia College & State University	Milledgeville	Georgia	Active	
**Epsilon Xi**	January 28, 1984 – 2014; 2019	University of North Carolina at Charlotte	Charlotte	North Carolina	Active	(Note: Chapter was formed by absorbing Sigma Epsilon Chi, established in 1981.)
Epsilon Omicron	October 5, 1984 – 199x ?; 2004–2015	Virginia Wesleyan University	Virginia Beach	Virginia	Inactive	
Epsilon Pi	January 24, 1986 – 199x ?; 2002–200x ?	Tarleton State University	Stephenville	Texas	Inactive	
Epsilon Rho	April 11, 1986 – 1999; 2004–2016	Purdue University	West Lafayette	Indiana	Inactive	(Note: Chapter formed by absorbing Phi Lambda Alpha, established in 1984. It reformed as a colony in 2002.)
**Epsilon Sigma**	April 18, 1986 – 2016	University of West Florida	Pensacola	Florida	Active	
**Epsilon Tau**	April 29, 1988	Northern Arizona University	Flagstaff	Arizona	Active	
Epsilon Upsilon	April 7, 1989 – 20xx ?	California State University, Bakersfield	Bakersfield	California	Inactive	
**Epsilon Phi**	November 11, 1989	George Mason University	Fairfax	Virginia	Active	
**Epsilon Chi**	December 1, 1989 – 20xx ?; 2014	University of Arkansas, Monticello	Monticello	Arkansas	Active	(Note: Chapter reformed in 2014 by absorbing the Squires Club, established in 2011.)
**Epsilon Psi**	September 22, 1990	University of North Carolina Wilmington	Wilmington	North Carolina	Active	(Note: Chapter was formed by absorbing Tau Nu Phi, established in 1988.)
**Epsilon Omega**	October 20, 1990	Arizona State University	Tempe	Arizona	Active	
**Zeta Alpha**	November 3, 1990 – 200x ?; October 30, 2021	University of Colorado Boulder	Boulder	Colorado	Active	
Zeta Beta	March 2, 1991 – 2022	Princeton University	Princeton	New Jersey	Inactive	
Zeta Gamma	March 3, 1991 – 20xx ?	Goldey–Beacom College	Pike Creek Valley	Delaware	Inactive	(Note: Chapter formed by absorbing Sigma Delta Rho (local) established in the 1960s.)
**Zeta Delta**	April 6, 1991 – 1996; 2015	University of Nevada, Reno	Reno	Nevada	Active	
**Zeta Epsilon**	March 12, 1993	Tennessee Tech	Cookeville	Tennessee	Active	(Note: Chapter formed by absorbing Kappa Alpha Kappa, established in 1991.)
Zeta Zeta	October 22, 1993 – 2019	Wingate University	Wingate	North Carolina	Inactive	
Zeta Eta	October 6, 1994 – 2015	Pennsylvania State University	University Park	Pennsylvania	Inactive	
**Zeta Theta**	April 22, 1995	James Madison University	Harrisonburg	Virginia	Active	
Zeta Iota	January 20, 1996 – 2017	Indiana State University	Terre Haute	Indiana	Inactive	
**Zeta Kappa**	September 21, 1996	University of West Georgia	Carrollton	Georgia	Active	
**Zeta Lambda**	February 7, 1997 – 2012; 2023	Bowling Green State University	Bowling Green	Ohio	Active	
Zeta Mu	April 19, 1997 – 2021	University of Washington	Seattle	Washington	Inactive	(Note: Chapter started as a colony in 1994.)
**Zeta Nu**	January 18, 2002	University of North Florida	Jacksonville	Florida	Active	
Zeta Xi	December 15, 2003 – 201x ?	Texas Wesleyan University	Fort Worth	Texas	Inactive	
**Zeta Omicron**	December 6, 2003	University of Southern Indiana	Evansville	Indiana	Active	
**Zeta Pi**	April 10, 2005	Florida Gulf Coast University	Fort Myers	Florida	Active	
**Zeta Rho**	May 7, 2009	University of Arkansas–Fort Smith	Fort Smith	Arkansas	Active	
Zeta Sigma	May 1, 2011 -2024	Southern Illinois University Carbondale	Carbondale	Illinois	Inactive	
**Sigma Alpha Commission**	May 16, 2011	United States Military Academy	West Point	New York	Commission	
**Zeta Tau**	November 19, 2011	Austin Peay State University	Clarksville	Tennessee	Active	
**Zeta Upsilon**	October 27, 2012	University of Tennessee at Chattanooga	Chattanooga	Tennessee	Active	
**Sigma Beta Commission**	May 16, 2014	United States Naval Academy	Annapolis	Maryland	Commission	
**Zeta Phi**	September 13, 2014	High Point University	High Point	North Carolina	Active	
**Zeta Chi**	March 5, 2015	Kennesaw State University	Cobb County	Georgia	Active	
**Zeta Psi**	November 17, 2017	Campbell University	Buies Creek	North Carolina	Active	
**Zeta Omega**	November 18, 2017	Coastal Carolina University	Conway	South Carolina	Active	
**Sigma Gamma Commission**	November 12, 2018	United States Air Force Academy	Colorado Springs	Colorado	Commission	
