= Richard Rivers =

Richard Rivers may refer to:

- Richard H. Rivers, American educator
- Richard Godfrey Rivers (1859–1925), English artist, active in Australia

== See also ==
- Dick Rivers (1945–2019), French singer and actor
- Richard Rives (1895–1982), American lawyer and judge
