= Star City Confederate Memorial =

- Star City Confederate Monument
- U.S. National Register of Historic Places
- U.S. Historic district – Contributing property
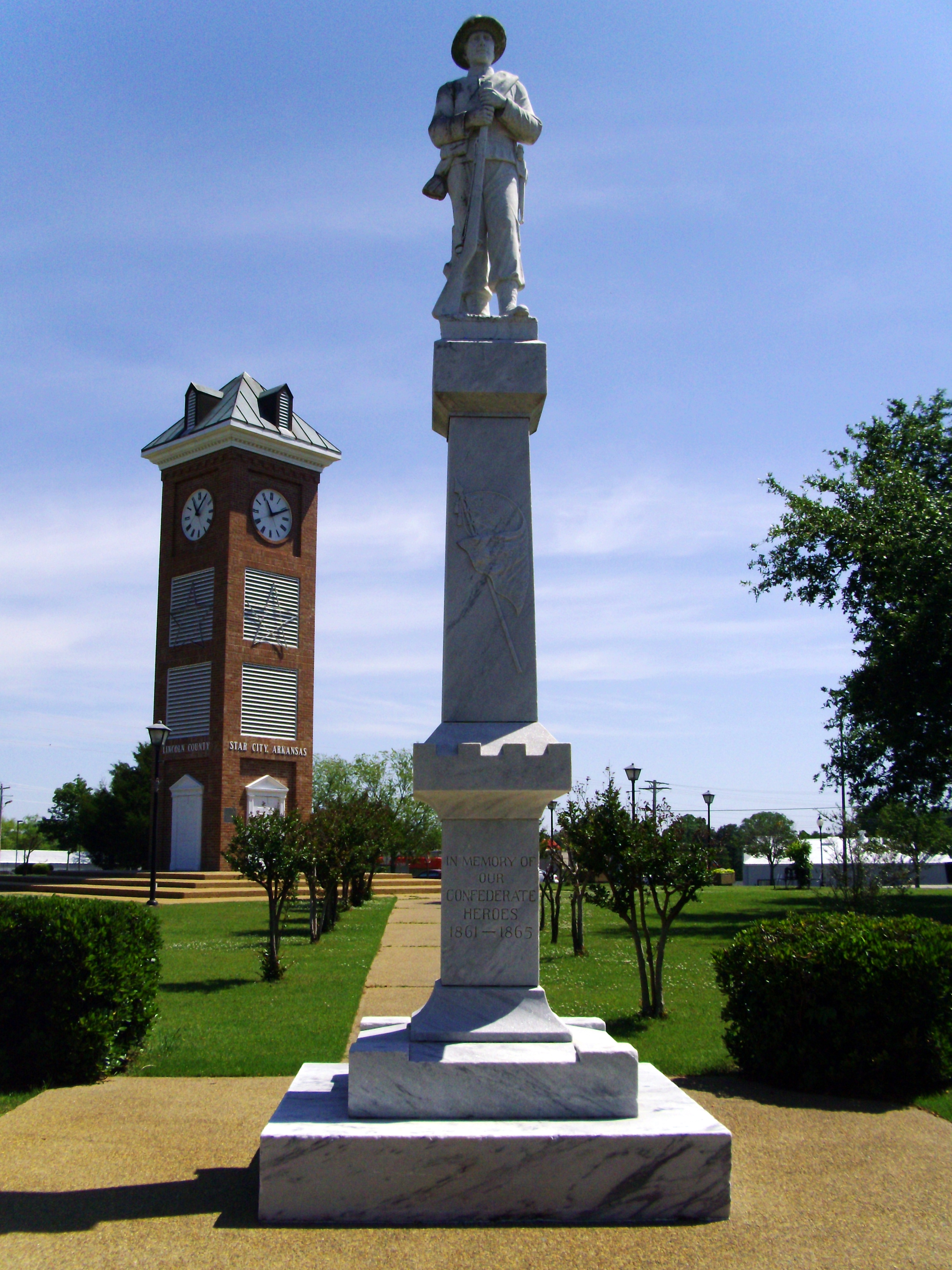

- Location within Arkansas Location within the United States
- Location: Town square, Star City, Arkansas
- Coordinates: 33°56′30″N 91°50′45″W
- Area: less than one acre
- Built: 1926; 100 years ago
- Part of: Star City Commercial Historic District (ID96000448)
- MPS: Civil War Commemorative Sculpture MPS
- NRHP reference No.: 96000448

Significant dates
- Added to NRHP: April 26, 1996
- Designated CP: February 26, 1999

The Star City Confederate Memorial is located at the southwest corner of the town square of Star City, Arkansas. The marble monument depicts a Confederate Army soldier standing in mid stride with his left foot forward. His hands hold the barrel of a rifle, whose butt rests on the monument base. The statue is about 6 feet (1.8 m) high and 2 feet (0.61 m) square; it rests on a marble foundation that is 20 feet (6.1 m) long, 12 feet (3.7 m) wide, and 8 feet (2.4 m) high. The monument was erected in 1926 by a local chapter of the United Daughters of the Confederacy at a cost of about $2,500.

The memorial was first placed on the grounds of the 1911 courthouse, which was made into the town square after that building was torn down in 1943. That year, the memorial was moved to the grounds of the new courthouse. In the 1990s it was moved back to the town square, and now stands near its original location.

All four sides of the monument base have inscriptions. The front, facing south, reads "IN MEMORY OF / OUR / CONFEDERATE / HEROES / 1861 - 1865". The east side reads "LINCOLN COUNTY / REMEMBERS THE / FAITHFULNESS OF / HER SONS AND / COMMENDS THEIR / EXAMPLE TO / FUTURE GENERATIONS." The north side reads "ERECTED BY / CAPT. J. MARTIN / MERONEY / CHAPTER NO. 1831 / OF LINCOLN COUNTY / U. D. C." The west side reads "OUR FURLED BANNER / WREATHED WITH / GLORY AND THOUGH / CONQUERED, WE ADORE / IT. WEEP FOR THOSE / WHO FELL BEFORE IT. / PARDON THOSE WHO / TRAILED AND TORE IT."

The monument was listed on the National Register of Historic Places in 1996.

== See also ==
- National Register of Historic Places listings in Lincoln County, Arkansas
