= Rice Family Cemetery =

Historic cemetery in Arkansas, United States

- U.S. National Register of Historic Places
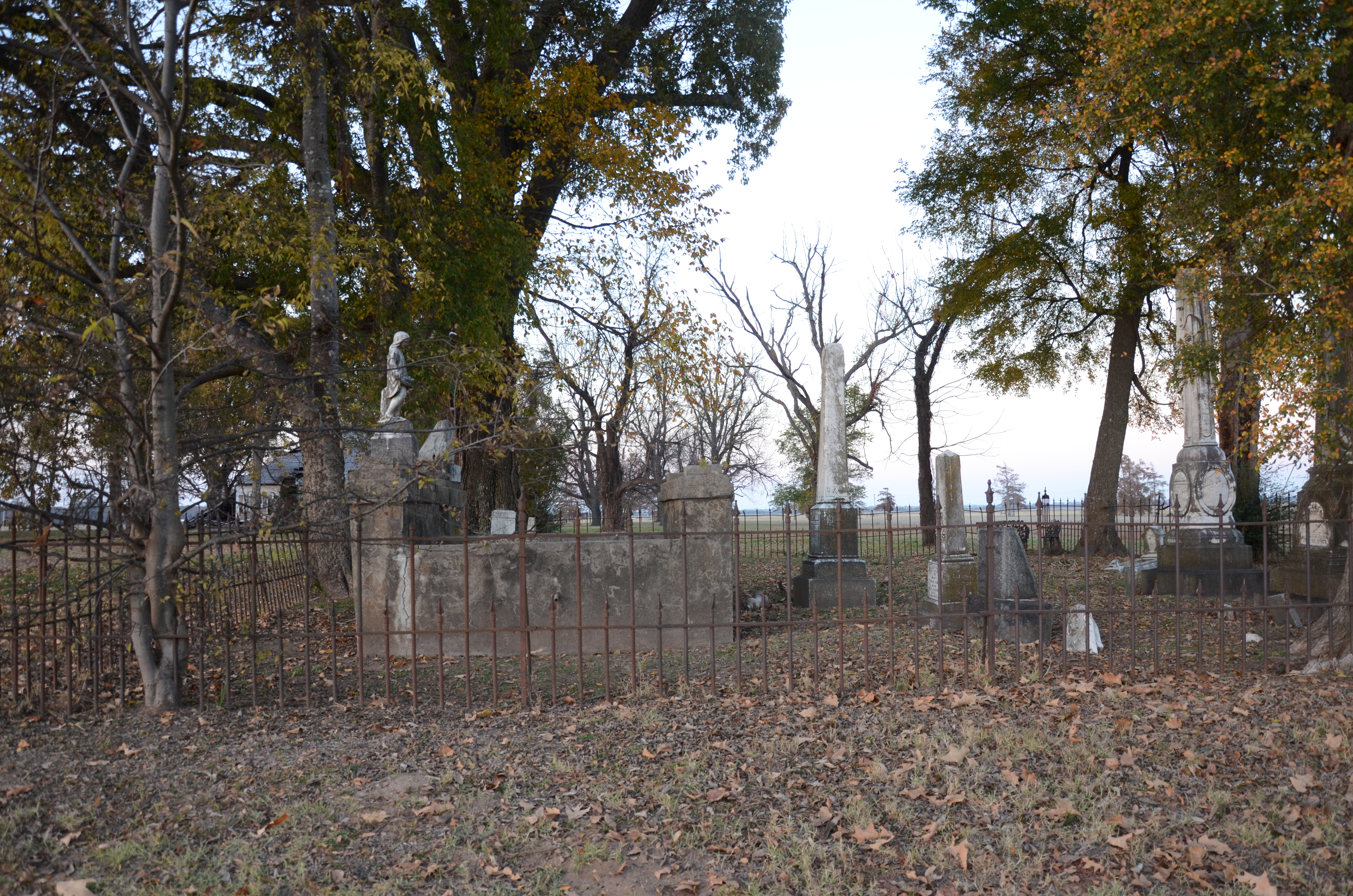

- Location within Arkansas Location within the United States
- Location: Northeast corner of US 65 and AR 388, Varner, Arkansas
- Coordinates: 34°2′34″N 91°36′44″W
- Area: 0.3 acres (0.12 ha)
- Built: 1870
- NRHP reference No.: 03000464
- Added to NRHP: May 29, 2003

The Rice Family Cemetery is a historic cemetery at the junction of United States Route 65 and Arkansas Highway 388 in rural Varner, Arkansas. The small cemetery is the burial site of Robert R. Rice, one of the early settlers of Varner and a prominent race horse enthusiast. The cemetery contains seventeen graves, eleven of which are marked, dating from 1870 to 1965. In addition to members of the Rice family, it also holds graves of the Varner and Douglas families, also associated with the area's early history.

The cemetery was listed on the National Register of Historic Places in 2003.

== See also ==
- National Register of Historic Places listings in Lincoln County, Arkansas
