= William Vaughan =

William Vaughan may refer to:

- William Vaughan (philanthropist) (died 1580), English landowner, farmer and philanthropist
- Sir William Vaughan (writer) (1575–1641), Welsh writer and colonial investor
- Sir William Vaughan (Royalist) (died 1649), English royalist commander in the First English Civil War
- William Gwyn Vaughan (1680s–1753), Welsh politician
- William Vaughan (MP) (c. 1707–1775), Member of Parliament for and Lord Lieutenant of Merioneth
- William Vaughan (merchant) (1752–1850), English West India merchant and author
- William Vaughan (bishop) (1814–1902), Roman Catholic Bishop of Plymouth
- William Wirt Vaughan (1831–1878), member of the United States House of Representatives
- William Wyamar Vaughan (1865–1938), British educationalist
- William Vaughan (footballer) (1898 – 1976), English footballer
- William E. Vaughan (1915–1977), American columnist and author
- William Vaughan (art historian) (fl. 1972–2015), British art historian
- William Edward Vaughan (fl. 1984–2013), Irish historian
- W. Harry Vaughan (1900–1993), founder of the Georgia Tech Research Institute

== See also ==
- William Vaughn (disambiguation)
