= Parker House (Star City, Arkansas) =

Historic house in Arkansas, United States

- U.S. National Register of Historic Places
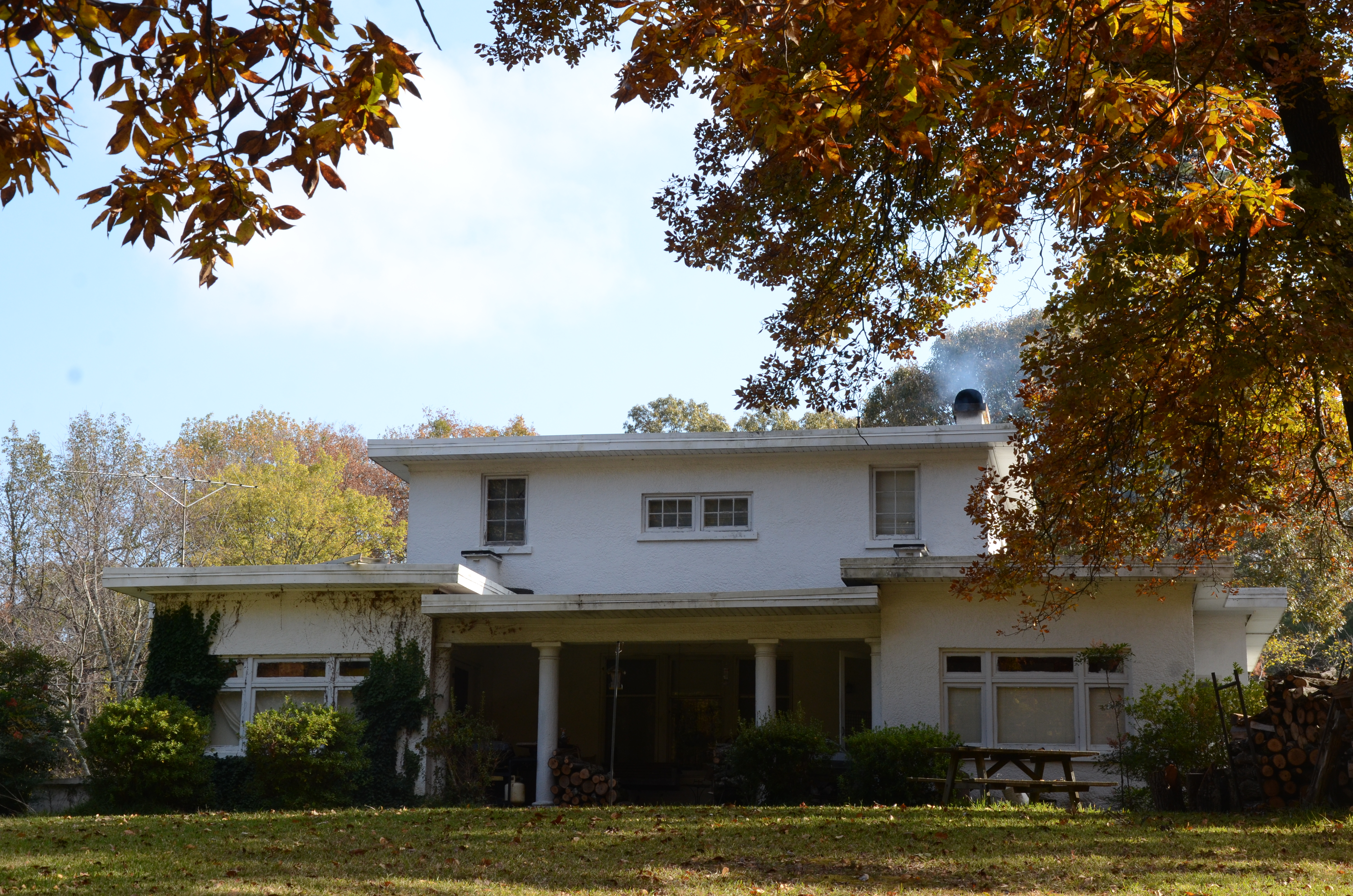

- Location within Arkansas Location within the United States
- Location: HC 64 Box 5, Star City, Arkansas
- Coordinates: 33°54′53″N 91°50′50″W
- Area: 5 acres (2.0 ha)
- Built: 1927
- Built by: Robert Preston Parker
- Architectural style: International Style, Mission Revival/Spanish Revival
- NRHP reference No.: 00000607
- Added to NRHP: June 2, 2000

The Parker House is a historic house on United States Route 425, two miles south of Star City, Arkansas. The two-story house was built in 1927 by Robert Preston Parker, and it exhibits International style with Mediterranean elements, and extremely unusual styling for a rural setting in southeastern Arkansas. Parker, its builder and first occupant, was a civil engineer with extensive railroad experience. He was responsible for surveying Star City and naming most of its streets, as well as designing a number of other local buildings.

The house was listed on the National Register of Historic Places in 2000.

== See also ==
- National Register of Historic Places listings in Lincoln County, Arkansas
