= Mt. Zion Presbyterian Church (Relfs Bluff, Arkansas) =

Historic church in Arkansas, United States

- U.S. National Register of Historic Places
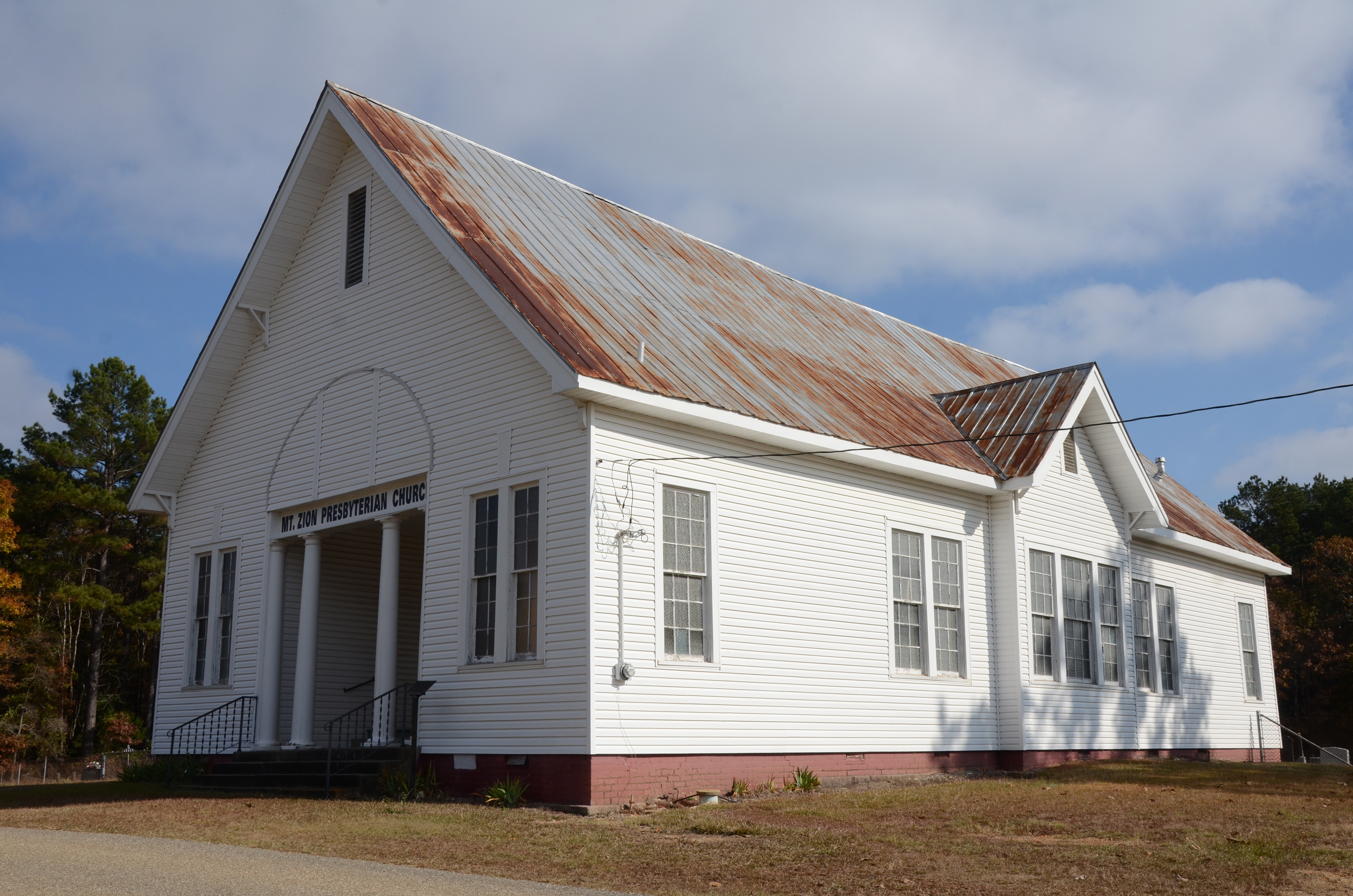

- Location within Arkansas Location within the United States
- Location: AR 81, Relfs Bluff, Arkansas
- Coordinates: 33°47′31″N 91°50′19″W
- Area: less than one acre
- Built: 1925
- Built by: Charlie Blakely
- Architectural style: Bungalow/craftsman
- NRHP reference No.: 87002496
- Added to NRHP: January 21, 1988

Mt. Zion Presbyterian Church is a historic church on Arkansas Highway 81 in Relfs Bluff, Arkansas. The single story wood-frame structure was built in 1925, and exhibits Craftsman styling with some Classical Revival detailing. The main facade has a gable end with brackets above a recessed entry with Tuscan columns. The wall is finished in flushboarding incised with a carved arch motif. The side elevations each have a central projecting section, which is topped by a gable dormer with three windows. The roof has wide eaves with exposed rafters. The interior has retained all of its original finishes, although the ceiling has been covered by asbestos tiles. The church was built for a congregation established in 1859.

The church was listed on the National Register of Historic Places in 1988.

== See also ==
- National Register of Historic Places listings in Lincoln County, Arkansas
