= Star City Commercial Historic District =

Historic district in Arkansas, United States

- U.S. National Register of Historic Places
- U.S. Historic district
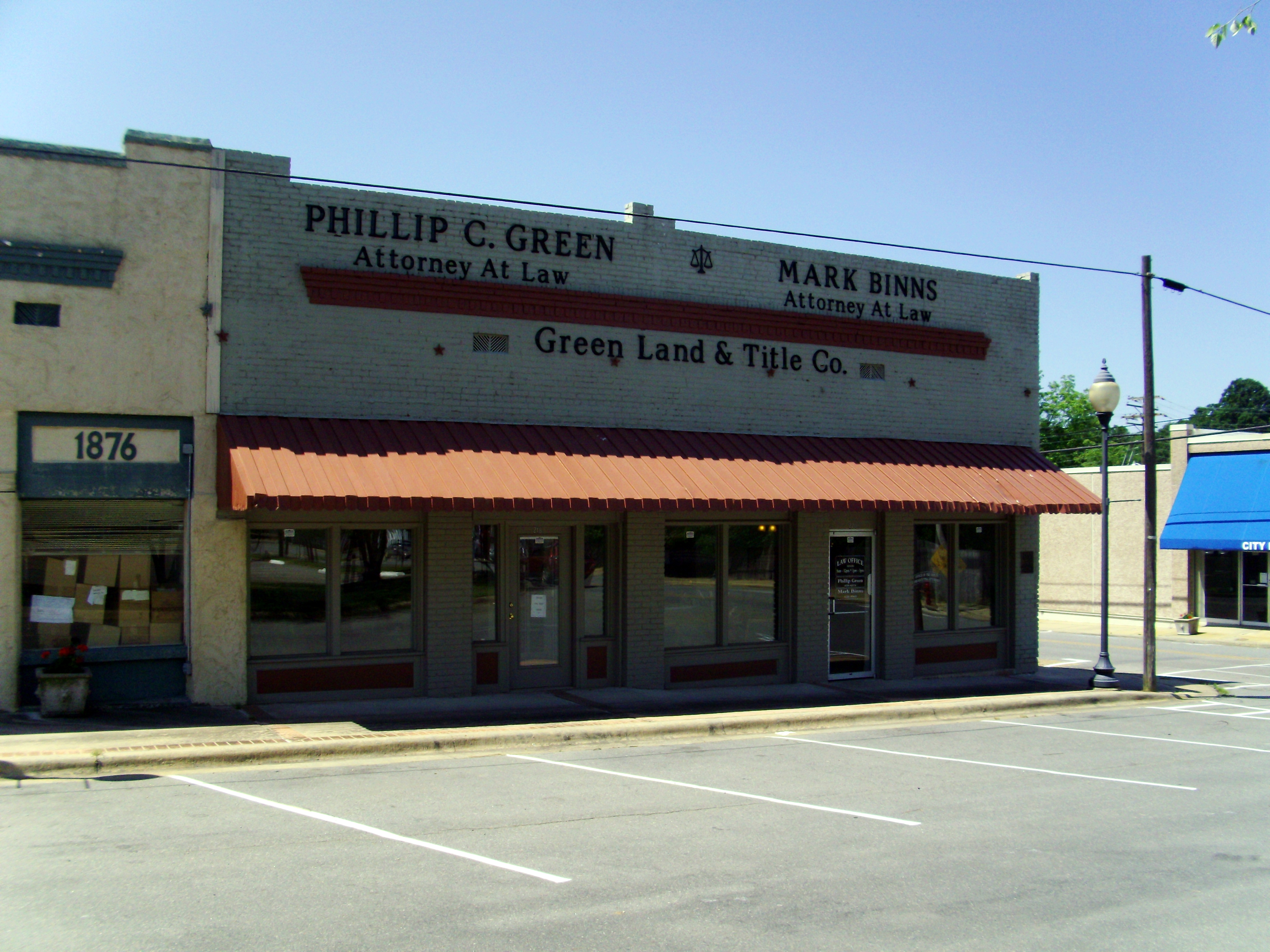

- Location within Arkansas Location within the United States
- Location: Roughly along Jefferson and Bradley Sts., Star City, Arkansas
- Coordinates: 33°56′30″N 91°50′44″W
- Area: 2.5 acres (1.0 ha)
- Built: 1916-1928
- Architectural style: Early Commercial
- NRHP reference No.: 99000152
- Added to NRHP: February 26, 1999

The Star City Commercial Historic District encompasses the historic commercial center of Star City, Arkansas, the county seat of Lincoln County. The district consists of thirteen buildings on two city blocks, as well as the Star City Confederate Memorial. The buildings are located on Jefferson Street, between Arkansas and Bradley Streets, and on Bradley Street between Jefferson and Drew Streets. The memorial is located in the town square, near the junction of Jefferson and Bradley. The buildings in the district were built between 1916 and 1928, and have for the most part escaped major alterations since their construction. Minor changes generally involve changes to store fronts, such as the boarding over of transom windows, the replacement of recessed entries with flush ones, and changes to the fenestration. The building at 108 Jefferson, built in 1927 to house a bar, has been extensively remodeled and does not contribute to the district's significance; the Star Theater building at 212-214 Bradley has also been extensively altered.

The district was listed on the National Register of Historic Places in 1999.

== See also ==
- National Register of Historic Places listings in Lincoln County, Arkansas
