= Charles Hampton Tracy House =

Historic house in Arkansas, United States

- Formerly listed on the U.S. National Register of Historic Places
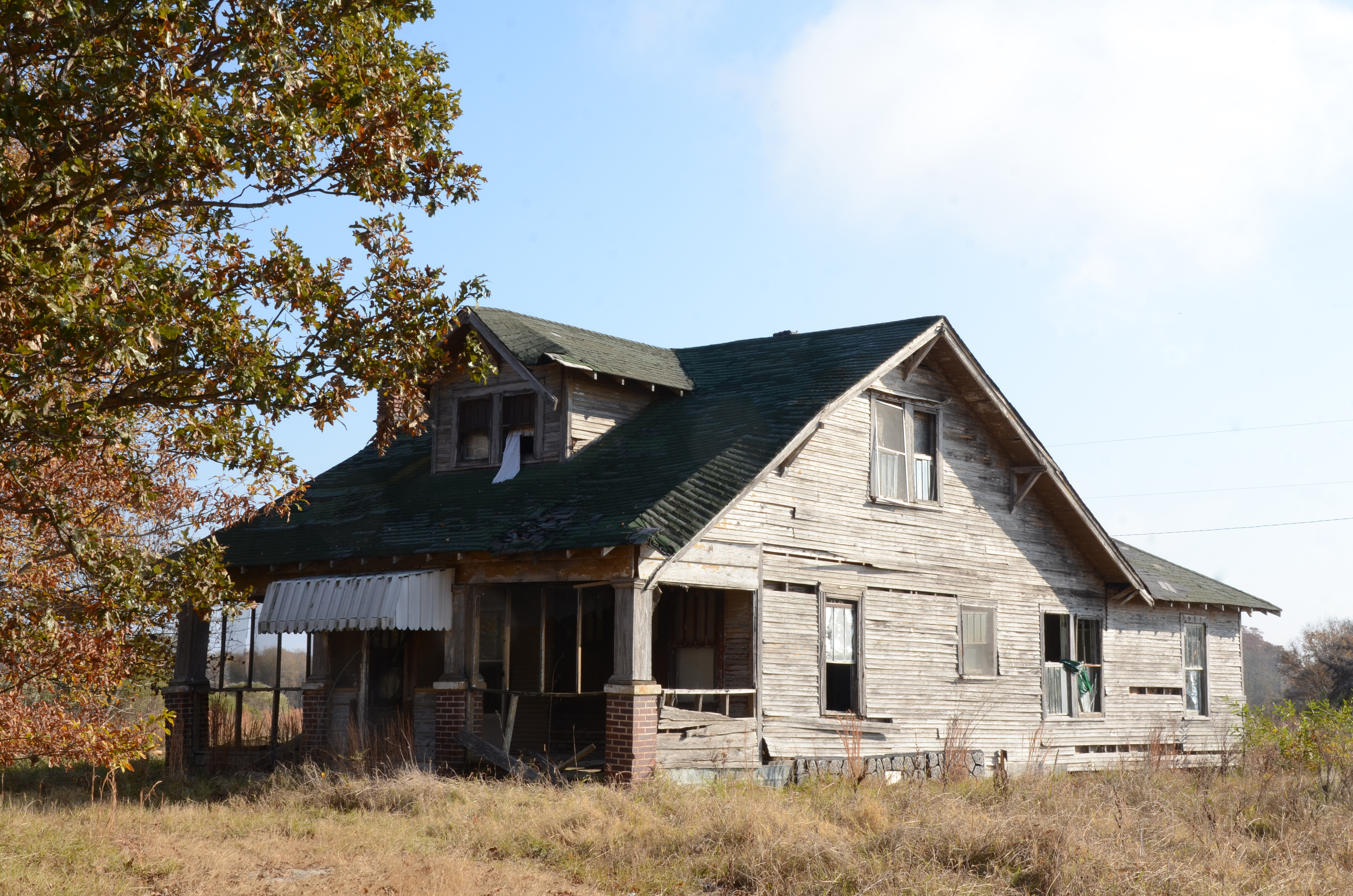
- Location: Blair Road/County Road 75, near Star City, Arkansas
- Area: 3 acres (1.2 ha)
- Built: 1923
- Built by: Charles Hampton Tracy
- NRHP reference No.: 10001156

Significant dates
- Added to NRHP: January 24, 2011
- Removed from NRHP: January 4, 2021

The Charles Hampton Tracy House is a historic house in rural Lincoln County, Arkansas. It is located at 2794 Blair Road (County Road 75), north and a little east of the county seat of Star City. The single story wood-frame house was built in 1923 by Charles Hampton Tracy, a successful local African-American cotton farmer. The house is a rare local example of Craftsman/Bungalow style, with exposed rafters under the eaves, a hip roof with a prominent gabled dormer, and a front porch supported by square columns on brick piers. The house is an emblem of the success of cotton farming in the area in the years before the Second World War, and the success of an African-American farmer despite the difficulties imposed by Jim Crow laws.

The house was listed on the National Register of Historic Places in 2011, and was delisted in 2021.

== History ==
Charles Hampton Tracy was an African American farmer born in Louisiana. He later relocated to Phenix, Arkansas, northeast of Star City, where he rented a house and a small tract of land from Bessie Hudson. Attracted by the area’s fertile soil and opportunities for cotton cultivation, Tracy moved to the property in 1924 to manage the farm and protect his investment. His decision was also influenced by his friend Albert Blow, who had described the relative prosperity and autonomy of Black residents in Lincoln County.

Tracy was among a number of Arkansas farmers who worked to improve cotton production. In March 1943, W. A. Anderson and C. A. Vines convened a meeting in Phenix, Arkansas, to consider establishing a one-variety cotton community. Thirty-two farmers attended, including Tracy, who helped lead the discussion. At the meeting, the participants organized the Phenix One-Variety Cotton Improvement Association. Similar organizations were established throughout the United States during this period. By 1946, Arkansas had 229 one-variety communities across 30 counties, with 10,788 participating farmers, reflecting the importance of the movement in the development of the state’s agriculture.

Tracy had the house built for his family in 1923. Before relocating from Louisiana to Phenix, Arkansas, he directed his friend Albert Blow by mail in the operation of the cotton farm for approximately a year. After moving to Phenix, Tracy managed the Arkansas farm in person while continuing to oversee his family’s farm in Louisiana through correspondence. In 1927, he was compelled to sell his cotton to pay taxes, receiving $36 for an entire bale despite owing several hundred dollars in tax liabilities. Tracy’s family joined him in Arkansas in 1931.

In 1936, Tracy moved to Gould, Arkansas, where he helped manage South Bend Farms, Inc., a 23,000-acre sharecropping enterprise on land formerly owned by former Illinois governor Frank O. Lowden. He returned to Phenix in 1939 after South Bend Farms fell $13,000 into debt. Tracy remained in Phenix until his death in 1963 at the age of 91.

Following his death, four more generations of Tracy’s descendants lived in the house. The residence remained occupied until 2007 and is now vacant. The house has remained largely unchanged since its construction, apart from the screening of the front and back porches, the replacement of three windows, the installation of a new floor, and restoration of the bathroom.

== See also ==
- National Register of Historic Places listings in Lincoln County, Arkansas
