= William J. Vaughn =

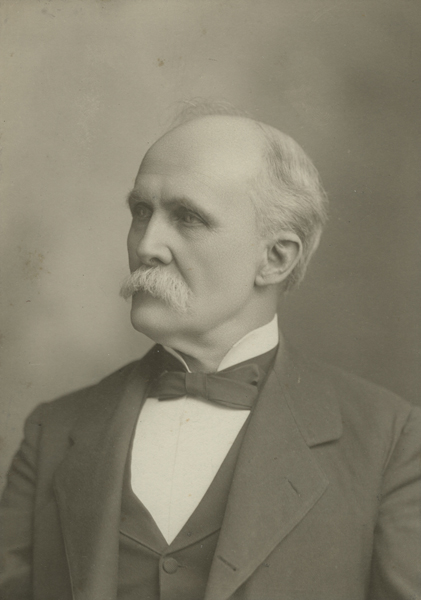
- Born: February 15, 1834; Wilcox County, Alabama, U.S.
- Died: December 1, 1912 (aged 78); Nashville, Tennessee, U.S.
- Occupations: University professor, school principal, librarian, book collector
- Spouse: Abbie Maria Scott
- Children: William Massey Vaughn; Eugene Houghton Vaughn; Harry Scott Vaughn; Robert Vaughn; Stella Scott Vaughn
- Parent(s): James Pulliam Vaughn; Susan Rebecca Richards Vaughn
- Relatives: William S. Vaughn (grandson)

William J. Vaughn (February 15, 1834 – December 1, 1912) was an American university professor, school principal, librarian and book collector. He was one of the earliest professors at the University of Alabama in Tuscaloosa, Alabama, and at Vanderbilt University in Nashville, Tennessee.

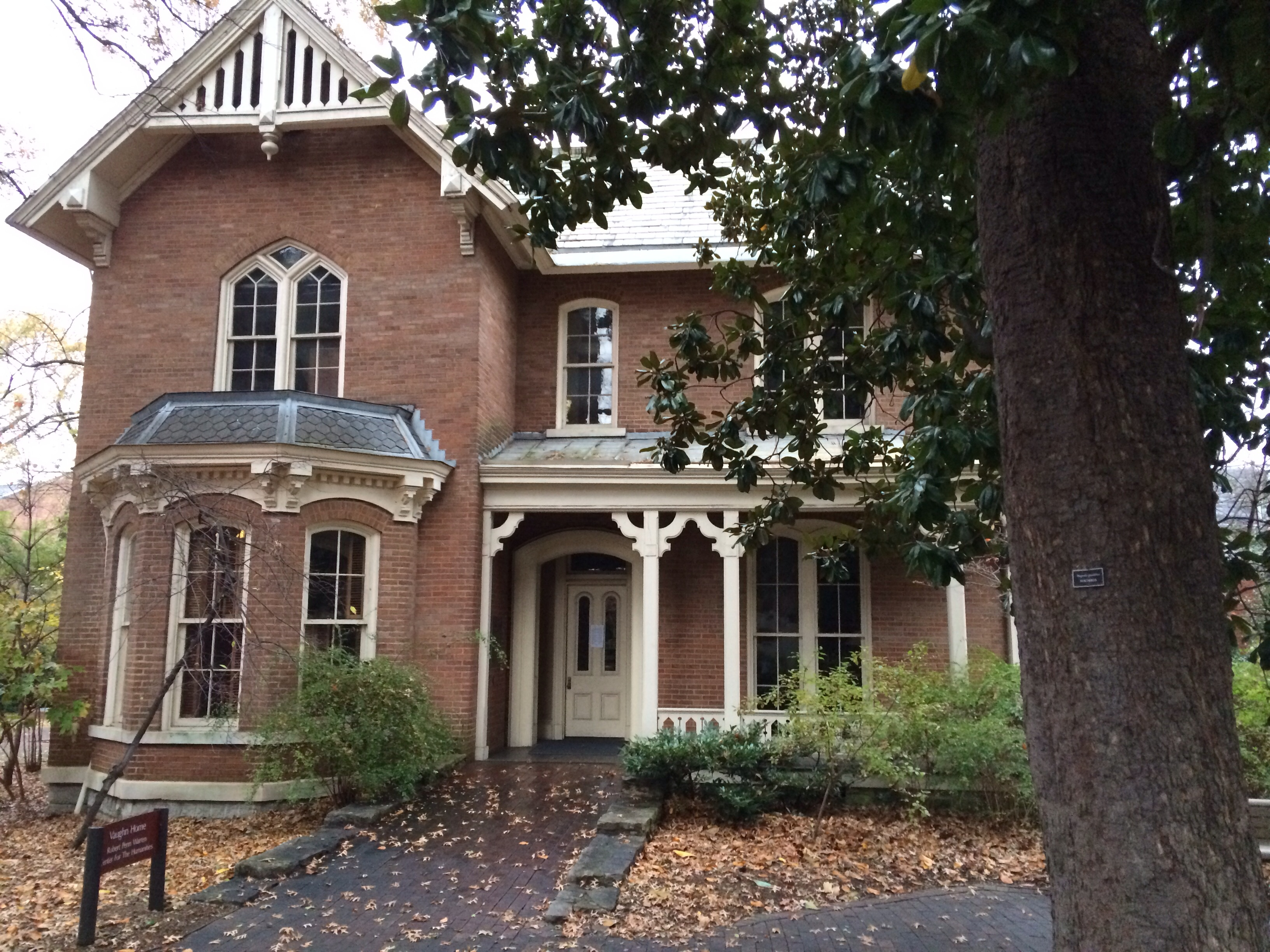
Vaughn Home, William J. Vaughn's house on the campus of Vanderbilt University, now home to the Robert Penn Warren Center for the Humanities.

== Early life and education ==
William James Vaughn was born on February 15, 1834, at Black Bluff, a settlement along the Alabama River in Wilcox County, Alabama. His father was James Pulliam Vaughn and his mother, Susan Rebecca Richards.

Vaughn received an A.B. in 1857 and an A.M. in 1860 from the University of Alabama in Tuscaloosa. Landon Garland (1810–1895) was one of his professors. He then received a Legum Doctor from the University of Mississippi in Oxford, Mississippi.

== Career ==
Vaughn started his career at his alma mater, the University of Alabama, where he tutored Mathematics from 1857 to 1860. He continued to teach at Alabama during the American Civil War: as an Instructor of Latin and Greek from 1860 to 1863, and as a Professor of Mathematics from 1863 to 1865.

Shortly after the war, from 1865 to 1866, Vaughn served as Principal of the Tuscaloosa Female College, a defunct women's college in Tuscaloosa, Alabama. He then served as Principal of Centenary Institute, a defunct boarding school in Summerfield, Alabama, from 1867 to 1871. He returned to the University of Alabama to teach Physics and Astronomy from 1871 to 1873. He went on to serve as the President of the defunct Tennessee Female College in Franklin, Tennessee, from 1873 to 1878. Shortly after, he returned again to the University of Alabama, where he served as Professor of Mathematics again from 1878 to 1882. He also founded its Department of Engineering in 1881-1882.

Vaughn spent the rest of his career at Vanderbilt University in Nashville, Tennessee, a newly established college thanks to a gift from railroad magnate Cornelius Vanderbilt. He was recruited by his former professor and now Vanderbilt University Chancellor, Landon Garland (1810–1895). He lived at the Vaughn House on the Vanderbilt University campus, now home to the Robert Penn Warren Center for the Humanities. He was Professor of Mathematics from 1882 to 1896, and Professor of Mathematics and Astronomy from 1896 to his death in 1912. One of his students was Edward Emerson Barnard (1857–1923). He also served as the main librarian (a precursor to Dean of Libraries) at Vanderbilt University from 1886 to his death. He also founded the Vanderbilt chapter of Phi Beta Kappa society, an honor society.

Additionally, Vaughn was a renowned book collector and an avid reader. He read more than ten foreign languages, including Sanskrit and Russian. He owned about 6,000 books, five hundred of which were about the French Emperor Napoleon (1769-1821); they were all donated to the Vanderbilt University library after his death.

== Personal life ==
On August 17, 1865, shortly after the Civil War, Vaughn married Abbie Maria Scott (1841-1923) in Marion, Alabama. He was thirty-one and she was twenty-four. They had three children:

- William Massey Vaughn (August 6, 1866 – November 26, 1949).
- Eugene Houghton Vaughn (October 25, 1868 – March 6, 1920). He married Margaret Musgrave.
- Harry Scott Vaughn (January 4, 1870 – February 14, 1958). He married Florence Sloan.

== Death and legacy ==
Vaughn died on December 1, 1912, in Nashville, Tennessee. His portrait, taken circa 1850, can be seen in the William Stanley Hoole Special Collections Library at the University of Alabama. His grandson, William S. Vaughn (1903–1996), was a prominent businessman who served on the Board of Trust of Vanderbilt University from 1952 to 1995.
