= Robert Kennon Hargrove =

American bishop (1829–1905)

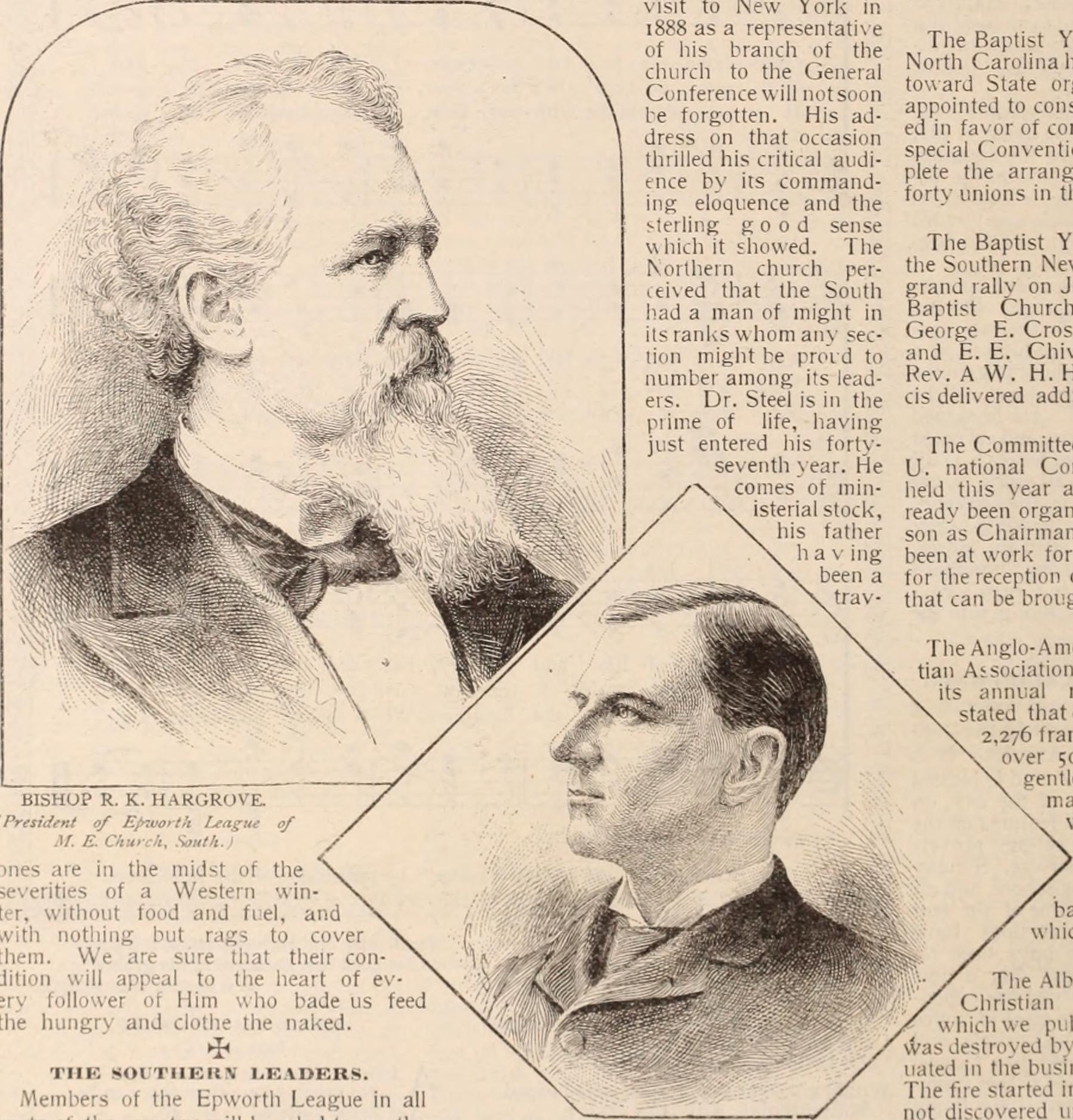
- Robert Kennon Hargrove (left) as published in Christian herald and signs of our times (1895)
- Born: September 17, 1829; Pickens County, Alabama, U.S.
- Died: August 4, 1905 (aged 75); Nashville, Tennessee, U.S.
- Resting place: Mount Olivet Cemetery; Nashville, Tennessee, U.S.
- Education: University of Pennsylvania
- Occupation: Bishop

Robert Kennon Hargrove (1829–1905) was an American bishop of the Methodist Episcopal Church, South, elected in 1882.

== Biography ==
Robert Kennon Hargrove was born on September 17, 1829, in Pickens County, Alabama. He was converted to Christianity at the age of eleven. He graduated from the University of Alabama in 1852.

He was a professor of Pure Mathematics at his alma mater, the University of Alabama, from 1853 to 1857. He entered the traveling ministry of the Alabama Annual Conference in 1857.

Prior to his election to the episcopacy, he served as a pastor and a presiding elder. He was President of the Centenary Institute in Summerfield, Alabama, 1865–67, and of Tennessee Female College in the 1870s. He was a member of the Cape May Commission in 1876. He was the first to urge a bond scheme, which saved the Publishing House of the M.E. Church, South. He originated the Women's Department of Church Extension (for the purpose of securing parsonages in the M.E. Church, South). He was also a member of the Commission that in 1878 established fraternal relations between the M.E. Church and the M.E. Church, South, an important step toward reunification in 1939.

He was not a member of the General Conference (1882) where he was elected bishop.

He died on August 4, 1905, in Nashville, Tennessee, and was buried there in Mount Olivet Cemetery.

== See also ==
- List of bishops of the United Methodist Church
