= Relfs Bluff, Arkansas =

- Unincorporated community
- Location within Arkansas Location within the United States
- Coordinates: 33°48′04″N 91°50′34″W
- Country: United States
- State: Arkansas
- County: Lincoln
- Elevation: 259 ft (79 m)
- Time zone: UTC-6 (Central (CST))
  - Summer (DST): UTC-5 (CDT)
- GNIS feature ID: 78161

Relfs Bluff is a populated place in Lincoln County, Arkansas, United States. It is the location of the 1925-built Mt. Zion Presbyterian Church, which is listed on the National Register of Historic Places.
