= William S. Vaughn =

American businessman (1903–1996)

- Born: December 8, 1903; Kansas City, Missouri
- Died: September 20, 1996 (aged 92); Brighton, New York
- Occupations: Businessman; Philanthropist
- Spouse: Elizabeth Harper Vaughn
- Relatives: William J. Vaughn (paternal grandfather); Stella Vaughn (paternal aunt)

William S. Vaughn (1903–1996) was an American businessman and philanthropist. He served as the President of Eastman Kodak from 1960 to 1967, and as its Chairman from 1967 to 1970.

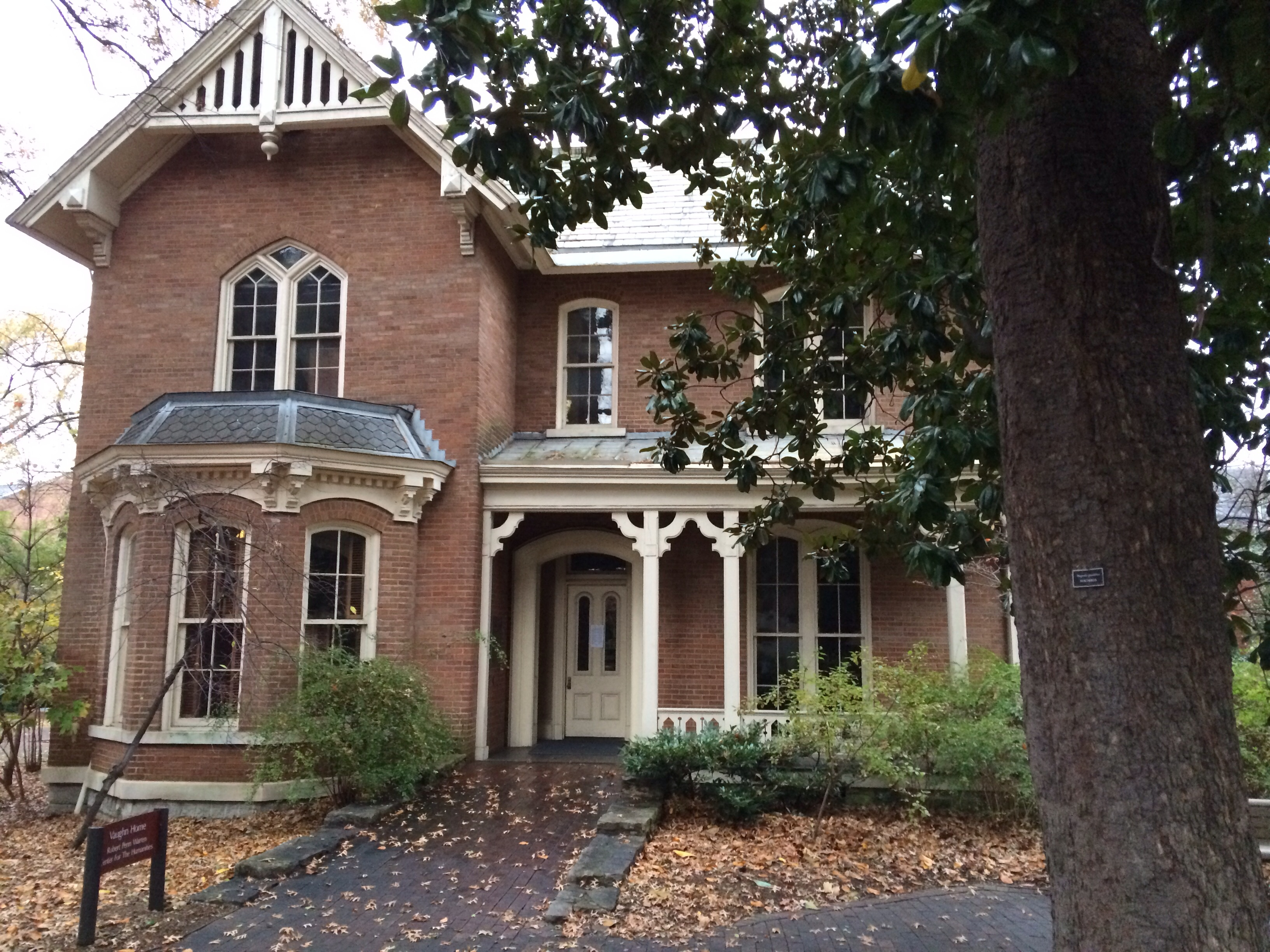
Vaughn Home, his paternal grandfather's house on the campus of Vanderbilt University

== Early life ==
William Scott Vaughn was born on December 8, 1903, in Kansas City, Missouri. His grandfather, William J. Vaughn, was a Professor of Mathematics at the University of Alabama in Tuscaloosa and later at Vanderbilt University in Nashville, Tennessee; the Vaughn Home on the Vanderbilt campus is named after him. His aunt, Stella Vaughn, pioneered women's athleticism at Vanderbilt University. His father, Harry Vaughn, worked as a dentist in Kansas City until he moved back to Nashville to become a businessman and bird collector; his bird collection was later donated to the Adventure Science Museum (previously known as the Nashville Children's Museum or the Cumberland Science Museum). William, his parents, and his two brothers, Charles and Houghton, lived on 24th Avenue, a few street away from his paternal grandfather's home. Later, they moved to a farm in the affluent suburb of Brentwood, Tennessee.

He was educated at the Robertson Academy, where he skipped the eighth grade, and at the Hume-Fogg High School in Nashville. He went on to graduate from Vanderbilt University in 1923, where he studied German and Mathematics and he was a member of Phi Beta Kappa society and Class Poet. He was then a Rhodes scholar at the Christ Church, a constituent college of the University of Oxford, where he received a Bachelor of Arts degree in Mathematics.

== Career ==
He started his career in the development department of Kodak in 1928. From 1942 to 1943, during the Second World War, he worked for the War Production Board in Washington, D.C. He returned to Kodak. He became President and Director of the Eastman Chemical Products, a Kodak subsidiary, in 1956. He then served as the President of Eastman Kodak from 1960 to 1967 and Chairman from 1967 to 1970. During his tenure, he committed to the training and employment of more African-Americans. He served on its board of directors until 1973.

Additionally, he served on the Boards of Directors of TRW Inc., Procter & Gamble and the Lincoln First Bank.

== Philanthropy ==
He sat on the Board of Trustees of his alma mater, Vanderbilt University, from 1952 to 1995, and as its President from 1968 to 1975. In 1985, together with his brother Houghton he donated $350,000 to restore the Vaughn Home on the Vanderbilt campus. In 1991, he donated an additional $150,000 to the Robert Penn Warren Center for the Humanities, a research center named for Robert Penn Warren (1905–1989) at Vanderbilt University. The William S. Vaughn Visiting Professorship at Vanderbilt University is now named in his honor.

He also served on the board of trustees of the University of Rochester as well as chairman of the board of directors of the Colgate Rochester Crozer Divinity School. Additionally, he served as a trustee of the George Eastman House, the Eastman School of Music and the YMCA in Rochester, New York.

A supporter of Civil Rights for African-Americans, he sat on the National Council of the United Negro College Fund and he was a member of the Rochester chapter of the National Association for the Advancement of Colored People (NAACP).

== Personal life ==
He was married to Elizabeth Harper Vaughn, whom he met through his German Professor, George Pullen Jackson (1874–1953), at Vanderbilt University, after the latter suggested he tutor her in German. They got married in 1928 in Rochester, New York, where they resided. Later, they resided at 258 Buckland Avenue in Brighton, New York.

== Death ==
He died on September 20, 1996, in Brighton, New York.
