= Centenary Institute (Alabama) =

School in Summerfield, Alabama

Coordinates: 32°31′01″N 87°02′34″W

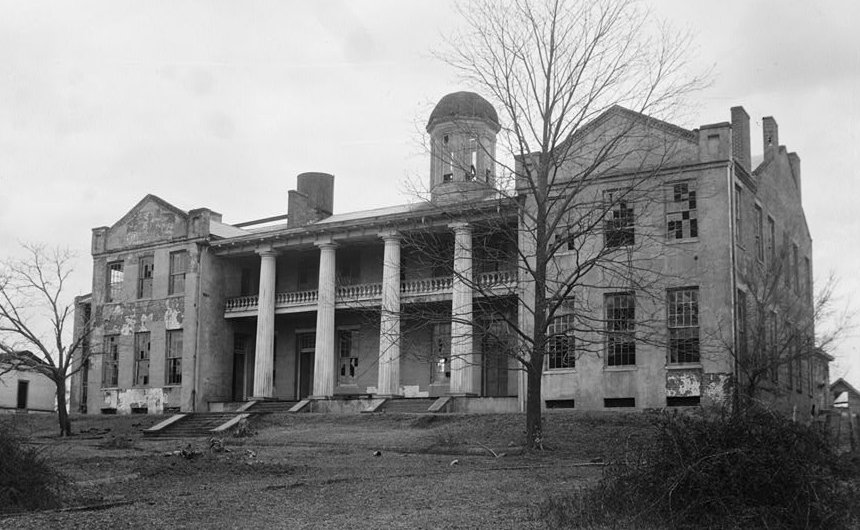
Ruins of the main building, Centenary Institute, 1934

Centenary Institute was a school in Summerfield, Alabama operated by the Methodist Episcopal Church, South, from 1829 until the 1880s. The Centenary Institute was founded in 1829 as Valley Creek Academy, a local school, but was turned over to the Methodist Episcopal Church in 1838. In celebration of the centennial of Methodism, the school was renamed the "Centenary Institute". A. H. Mitchell served as president of the institute from 1843 until 1856. In 1845, the school was conferred the power to grant degrees, and graduated its first class that same year. For the next two decades, the school was the largest in central Alabama, enrolling approximately 500 students. J. N. Montgomery was president from 1856 until the Civil War; he was followed by Richard H. Rivers, William J. Vaughn, and R. K. Hargrove. The Institute saw its fortunes decline precipitously during the war; by 1865 buildings were in need of repair, and in 1867 the school saw but three graduates. The Panic of 1873 impacted the school further, driving enrollment to fifty by 1874–75. In 1880, the Methodists ceased supporting the school, and the Institute began to act solely as a local school. The institute was abandoned by 1885, and its buildings were used as an orphan asylum.
