= Crow–Hightower House =

Historic house in Colorado, United States

- U.S. National Register of Historic Places
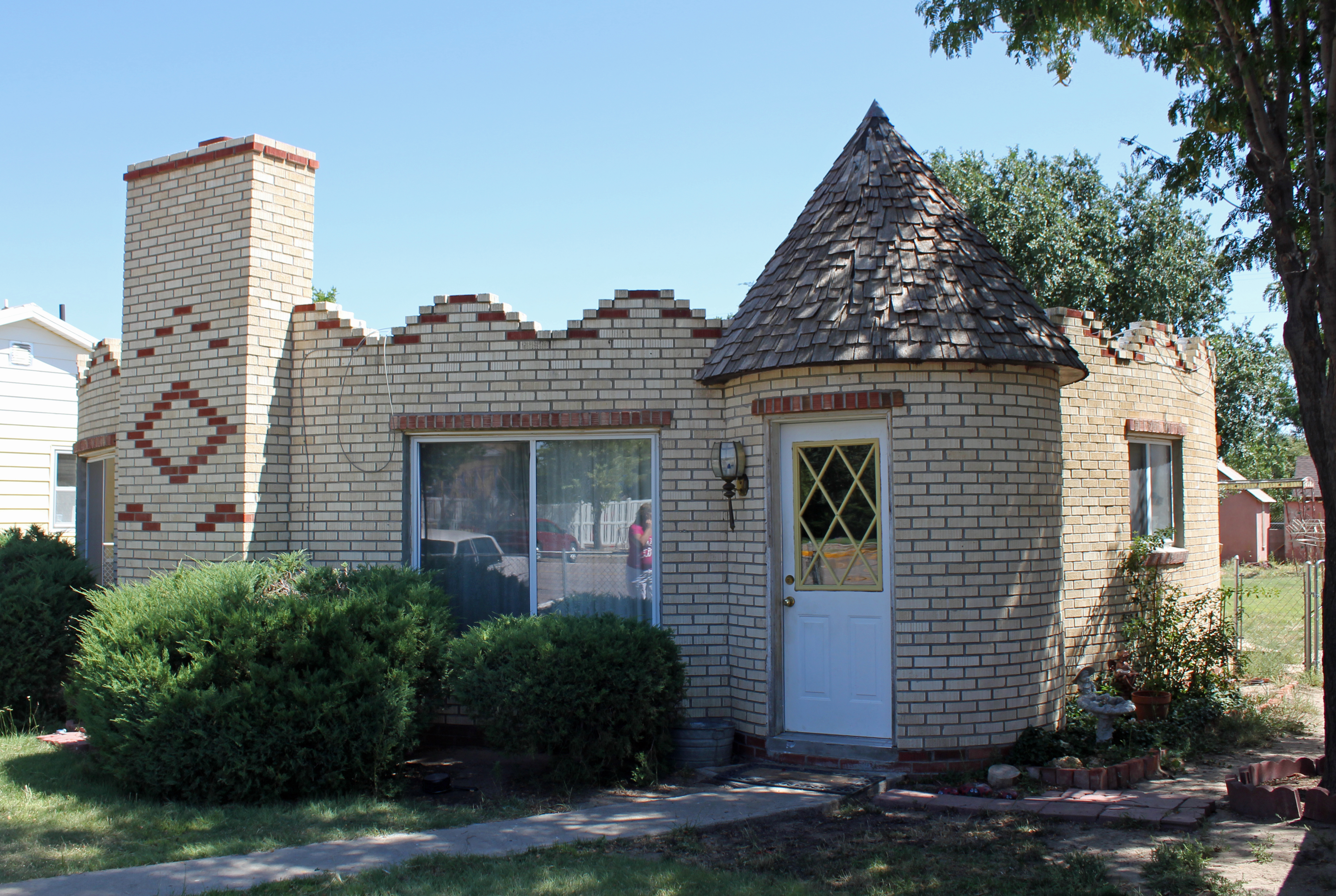
- The house in 2013.

- Location within Colorado Location within the United States
- Location: 909 Maine Street, Eads, Colorado
- Coordinates: 38.4832°N 102.7814°W
- Built: 1952
- Built by: Warren A. Portrey
- NRHP reference No.: 13000605
- Added to NRHP: August 20, 2013

The Crow–Hightower House is a historic house located at 909 Maine Street in Eads, Colorado. It was listed on the National Register of Historic Places on August 20, 2013.

== Description and history ==
It was deemed significant "for its representation of a circular plan Modern Movement/Novelty style dwelling. The style is reflected in the house's circular plan, conical entrance turret, roof crenelations, contrasting blond and red brick, and innovative interior layout. The house is a relatively rare example of the round form employed in a mid-twentieth century dwelling."
