= Crow House (Star City, Arkansas) =

Historic house in Arkansas, United States

- U.S. National Register of Historic Places
- Location: 7 miles southeast of Star City
- Nearest city: Star City, Arkansas
- Area: less than one acre
- Built: c.1874
- Built by: Crow, R.C.
- NRHP reference No.: 76000426
- Added to NRHP: June 29, 1976

The Crow House near Star City, Arkansas is a historic house that was built in about 1874. It was listed on the National Register of Historic Places in 1976. The house is a dog-trot style house that was built of cypress wood in about 1874. In 1976, the house had been vacant for about five years, but had structural integrity. It was deemed significant for NRHP listing as an example of a late-1800s rural farmhouse.

== See also ==
- National Register of Historic Places listings in Lincoln County, Arkansas
