= Richard H. Rivers =

Richard H. Rivers (also known as Richard Henderson Rivers and R.H. Rivers) was a nineteenth-century educator. He was president of Centenary College of Louisiana from 1849 to 1853 and subsequently president of La Grange College near Leighton, Alabama, an esteemed early Methodist institution. He also served as president of Centenary Institute in Summerfield, Alabama for a short time. Rivers was instrumental in relocating the fiscally troubled La Grange to nearby Florence in 1855, where it retained its Methodist affiliation and was known variously as Florence Wesleyan and Wesleyan College. Briefly prosperous, college failed during the Civil War after Rivers himself had departed. In the early 1870s, the property was turned over to the state of Alabama, and a normal school was established, known currently as the University of North Alabama.

== Biography ==
Rivers was an early graduate of La Grange College. He was also a Methodist minister. Rivers taught at La Grange from 1836 to 1843, then taught in Tennessee and in 1849 became president of Centenary College of Louisiana. He was the author of several important treatises, including Elements of Moral Philosophy, a college text used throughout the south in the 1850s justifying slavery on theological grounds.

== Bibliography ==
Anson West, A History of Methodism in Alabama (1883)

- Books.google edition of Elements of Moral Philosophy
