= Summerfield District =

Historic district in Alabama, United States

- U.S. National Register of Historic Places
- U.S. Historic district
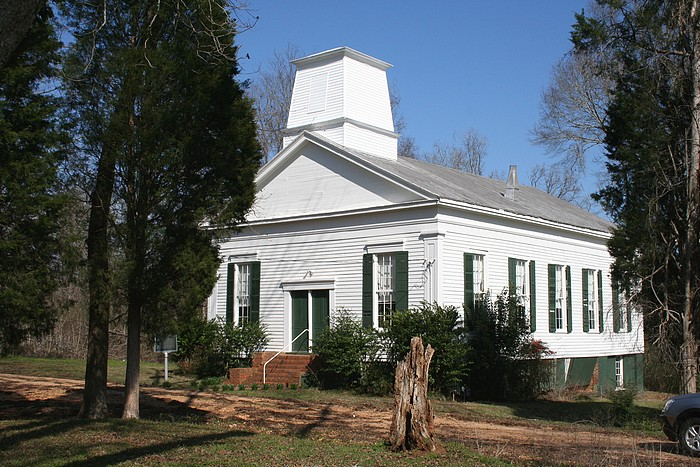
- The Summerfield Methodist Church, built in 1845.

- Location within Alabama Location within the United States
- Location: Selma-Summerfield and Marion Rds., Centenary and College Sts., Summerfield, Alabama
- Coordinates: 32°24′26″N 87°1′1″W
- Area: 56.2 acres (22.7 ha)
- Architect: Multiple
- NRHP reference No.: 82002011
- Added to NRHP: March 1, 1982

The Summerfield District is a 56.2-acre (22.7 ha) historic district in Summerfield, Alabama, United States. It is bounded by the Selma-Summerfield and Marion roads, and Centenary and College streets. Federal and Greek Revival are the primary architectural styles in the district. It contains 10 contributing properties and six noncontributing properties. The contributing properties are the Summerfield Methodist Church (1845), Summerfield Bank Building (mid 19th century), school (mid 19th century), Moore-Pinson-Tate-Hudson House (1840s), Sturdivant-Moore-Caine-Hodo House (c. 1830), Johnson-Chisolm-Reed House (mid 19th century), unnamed residence (late 19th century), Bishop Andrew-Brady House (c. 1840), Swift-Moore-Cottingham House (c. 1850), and Childers-Tate-Crow House (prior to 1827). The Summerfield District was added to the National Register of Historic Places on March 1, 1982.
