= Oscar Crow House =

Historic house in Arkansas, United States

- U.S. National Register of Historic Places
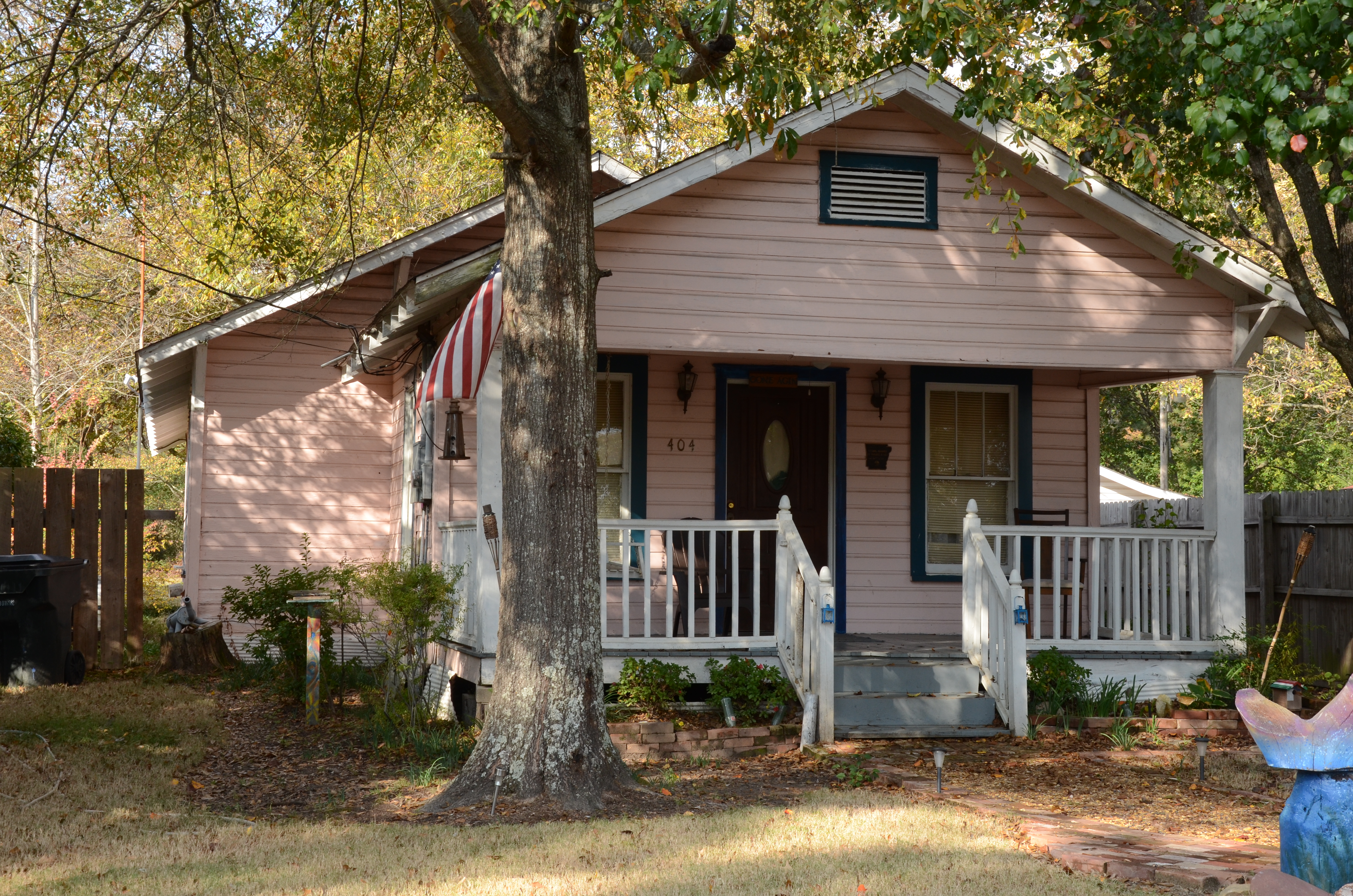

- Location within Arkansas Location within the United States
- Location: 404 Washington Street, Star City, Arkansas
- Coordinates: 33.93913°N 91.84754°W
- Area: less than one acre
- Built: 1929
- Built by: Robert and Doug Verdue
- NRHP reference No.: 92001343
- Added to NRHP: October 8, 1992

The Oscar Crow House is a historic house at 404 Washington Street in Star City, Arkansas. The single story wood-frame house was built in 1929 by Robert and Doug Verdue for Oscar Crow, owner of a local drug store. The Craftsman style house resembles a shotgun house, but does not exactly follow that form, because its rooms do not progress linearly from the front. The front of the house has a recessed porch supported by box columns, with a vent placed in the gable-end pediment. The front entry is flanked by three-over-one sash windows. The north (right side) elevation has four three-over-one windows that are irregularly spaced, and the south side has two such windows, also irregularly spaced. The rear of the house also has a recessed porch. Exposed rafters decorate the roof line.

The house was listed on the National Register of Historic Places in 1992, as a well-preserved example of restrained Craftsman style.

== See also ==
- National Register of Historic Places listings in Lincoln County, Arkansas
