= Summerfield, Alabama =

Unincorporated community in Alabama, United States

- Unincorporated community
- Location in Alabama Summerfield (the United States)
- Coordinates: 32°31′14″N 87°02′30″W
- Country: United States
- State: Alabama
- County: Dallas
- Elevation: 322 ft (98 m)
- Time zone: UTC-6 (Central (CST))
  - Summer (DST): UTC-5 (CDT)
- Area code: 334
- GNIS feature ID: 160692

Summerfield, also known as Valley Creek, is an unincorporated community in Dallas County, Alabama. Summerfield has one historic district included on the National Register of Historic Places, the Summerfield District. Most of the community was annexed into Valley Grande following its incorporation as a city in 2003. Summerfield was the home of the Centenary Institute, a school operated by the Methodist Episcopal Church, South, from 1829 until the 1880s.

== Demographics ==
Historical population
Census	Pop.	Note	%±
1890	383		—
U.S. Decennial Census

Summerfield was listed as an incorporated community in the 1890 U.S. Census with a population of 383, making it the second largest community in Dallas County after Selma. It was not listed on any subsequent censuses.

== Notable people ==
- James Osgood Andrew, bishop in the Methodist Episcopal Church, resided here during the American Civil War
- Robert Kennon Hargrove, lived here while president of Centenary Institute from 1865 to 1867
- Richard H. Rivers, lived here while president of Centenary Institute
