= List of lakes of Baxter County, Arkansas =

There are at least 6 named lakes and reservoirs in Baxter County, Arkansas.

== Lakes ==
According to the United States Geological Survey, there are no named lakes in Baxter County.

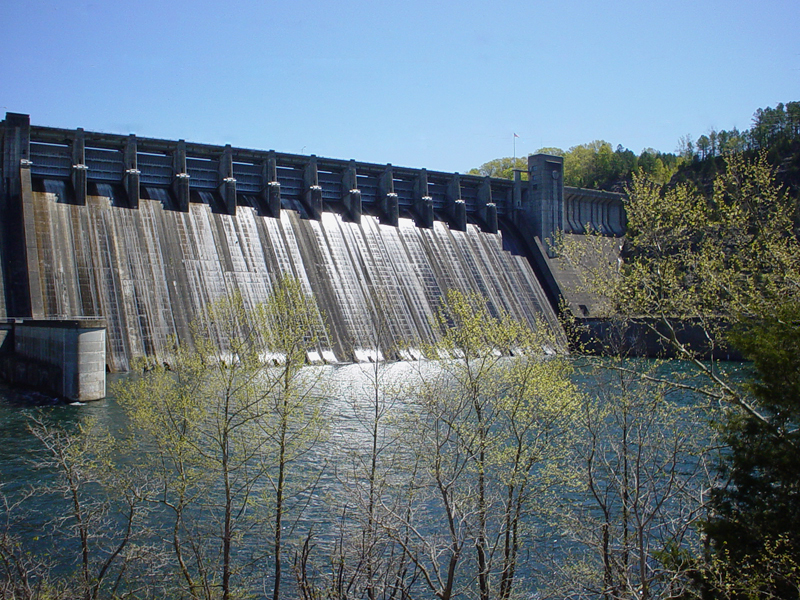
Norfork Dam creates Norfork Lake and the Norfork Tailwater near Salesville.

== Reservoirs ==
- Big Flat Lake, 35°59′38″N 092°23′49″W, el. 1,155 feet (352 m)
- Bull Shoals Lake, 36°28′02″N 092°48′33″W, el. 653 feet (199 m)
- Gardner Lake, 36°21′32″N 092°25′00″W, el. 853 feet (260 m)
- Higginbottom Lake, 36°21′48″N 092°24′49″W, el. 869 feet (265 m)
- Norfork Lake, 36°15′49″N 092°14′33″W, el. 548 feet (167 m)
- Ozark Acres Lake, 36°17′48″N 092°27′37″W, el. 761 feet (232 m)

== See also ==
- List of lakes in Arkansas
