= Baxter County Courthouse =

Building in Arkansas, US

- U.S. National Register of Historic Places
- U.S. Historic district – Contributing property
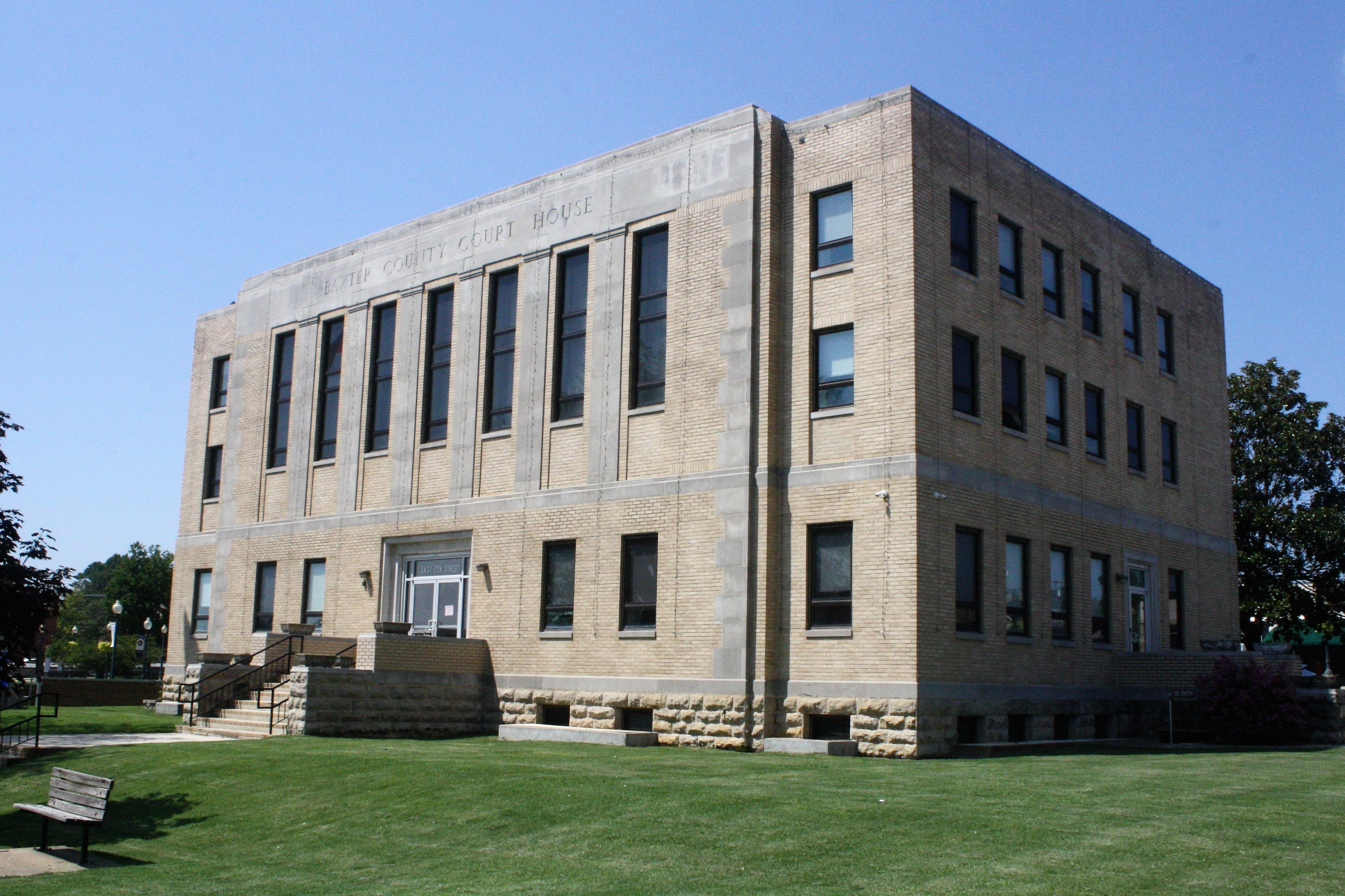

- Location within Arkansas Location within the United States
- Interactive map showing the location of Baxter County Courthouse
- Location: Courthouse Square, Mountain Home, Arkansas
- Coordinates: 36°20′7″N 92°23′5″W
- Area: less than one acre
- Built: 1941
- Built by: Works Progress Administration
- Architect: T. Ewing Shelton
- Architectural style: Art Moderne
- Part of: Mountain Home Commercial Historic District (ID10000348)
- NRHP reference No.: 95000658

Significant dates
- Added to NRHP: May 26, 1995
- Designated CP: June 15, 2010

The Baxter County Courthouse is a courthouse in Mountain Home, Arkansas, United States, the county seat of Baxter County, built in 1941. It was listed on the National Register of Historic Places in 1995. The building replaced another courthouse on the same site which was deemed unsafe in 1939.

== History ==
Baxter County was established on March 24, 1873 by the Arkansas General Assembly from parts of four neighboring counties. The county seat was established at Mountain Home, which was a community atop a plateau between the North Fork River and White River. County government initially inhabited the Jacob Wolf House in Norfork. Today, the structure is the oldest standing county courthouse in Arkansas, built in 1811.

=== Building the courthouse ===
County Judge R. M. Ruthven declared the county courthouse to be unsafe and too small for county needs in 1939. Ruthven was instrumental in the construction of the Cotter Bridge in Baxter County which opened the area to commerce in 1928. The courthouse was expanded from two to three stories as a method to keep the county seat in Mountain Home in response to a 1912 state law which kept county seats from moving out of three story buildings. Ruthven acquired the services of T. Ewing Shelton, an architect from Fayetteville, Arkansas to draft plans for a new courthouse. The plans were received and approved by voters, despite protests by Gassville and Cotter residents who wanted the county seat relocated to their cities with greater populations.

During the 1940s, Baxter County was very depressed economically and the Works Progress Administration (WPA) was active in the county. Mountain Home was a shrinking community with little industry and few paved roads. As a county, Baxter County saw many farmers abandon their farms and move away during the 1940s. Construction began on the Norfork Dam in 1941 and the Bull Shoals Dam in 1947. The courthouse project received state approval as a WPA project the following year and construction began after razing the old courthouse in August 1941.

== Opening ==
The new building was unveiled for county courthouse functions in August 1943. It contained all county offices, a courtroom, office space to be rented to lawyers, and the county library. Today many offices have left the courthouse.

== See also ==
- Cotter Bridge
- List of county courthouses in Arkansas
- National Register of Historic Places listings in Baxter County, Arkansas
