= Baxter County, Arkansas =

County in Arkansas, United States

- County
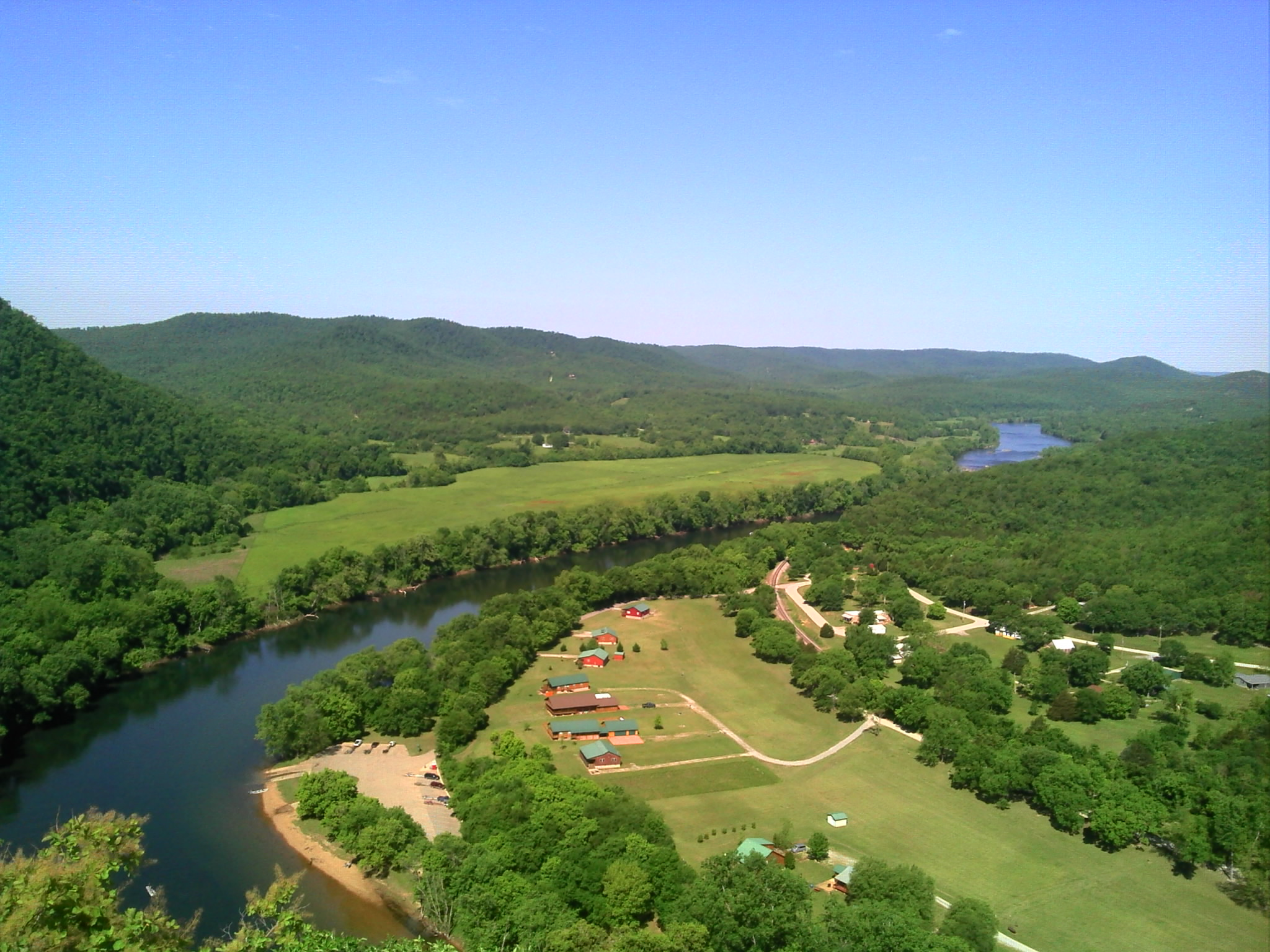
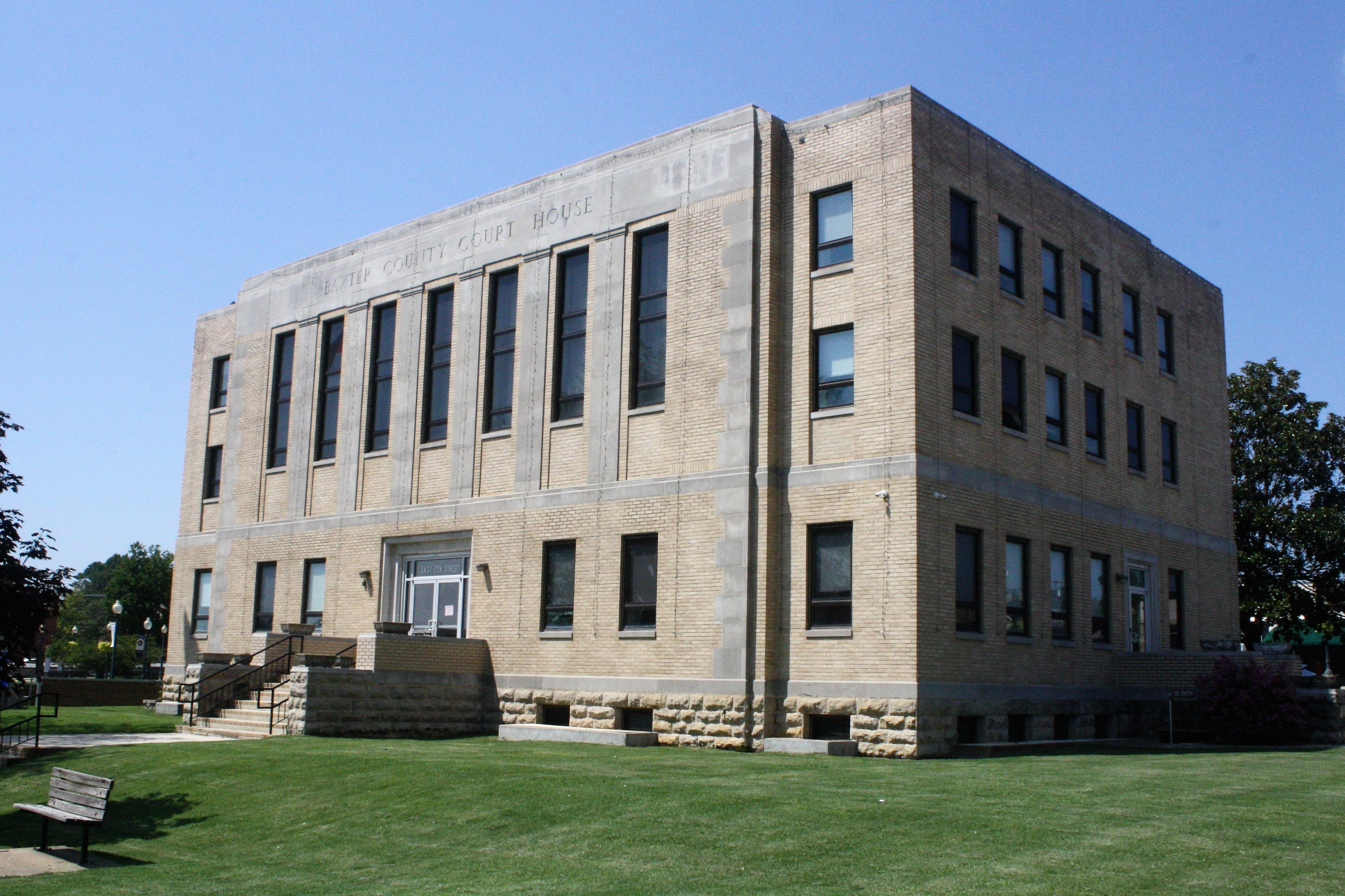
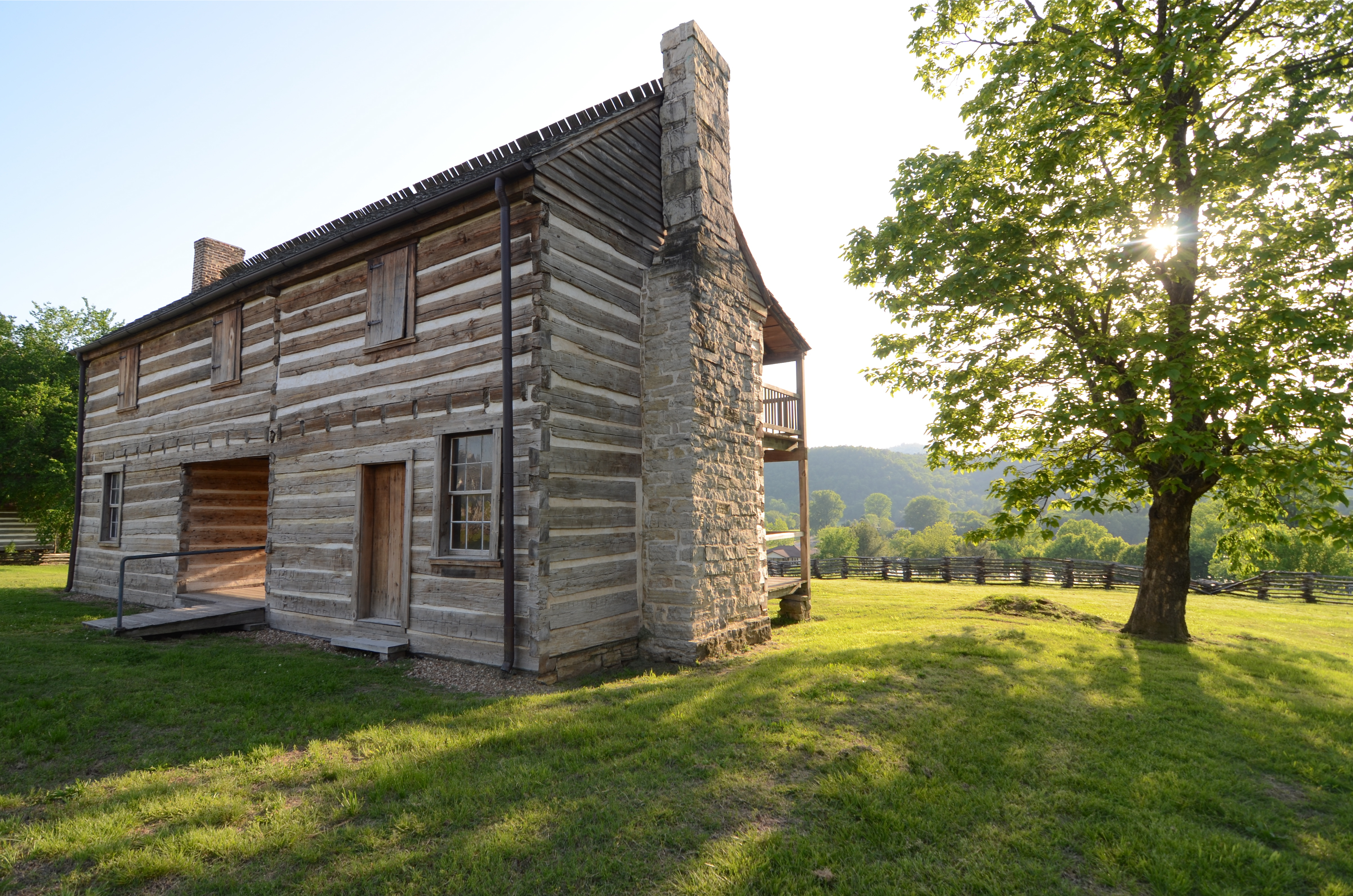
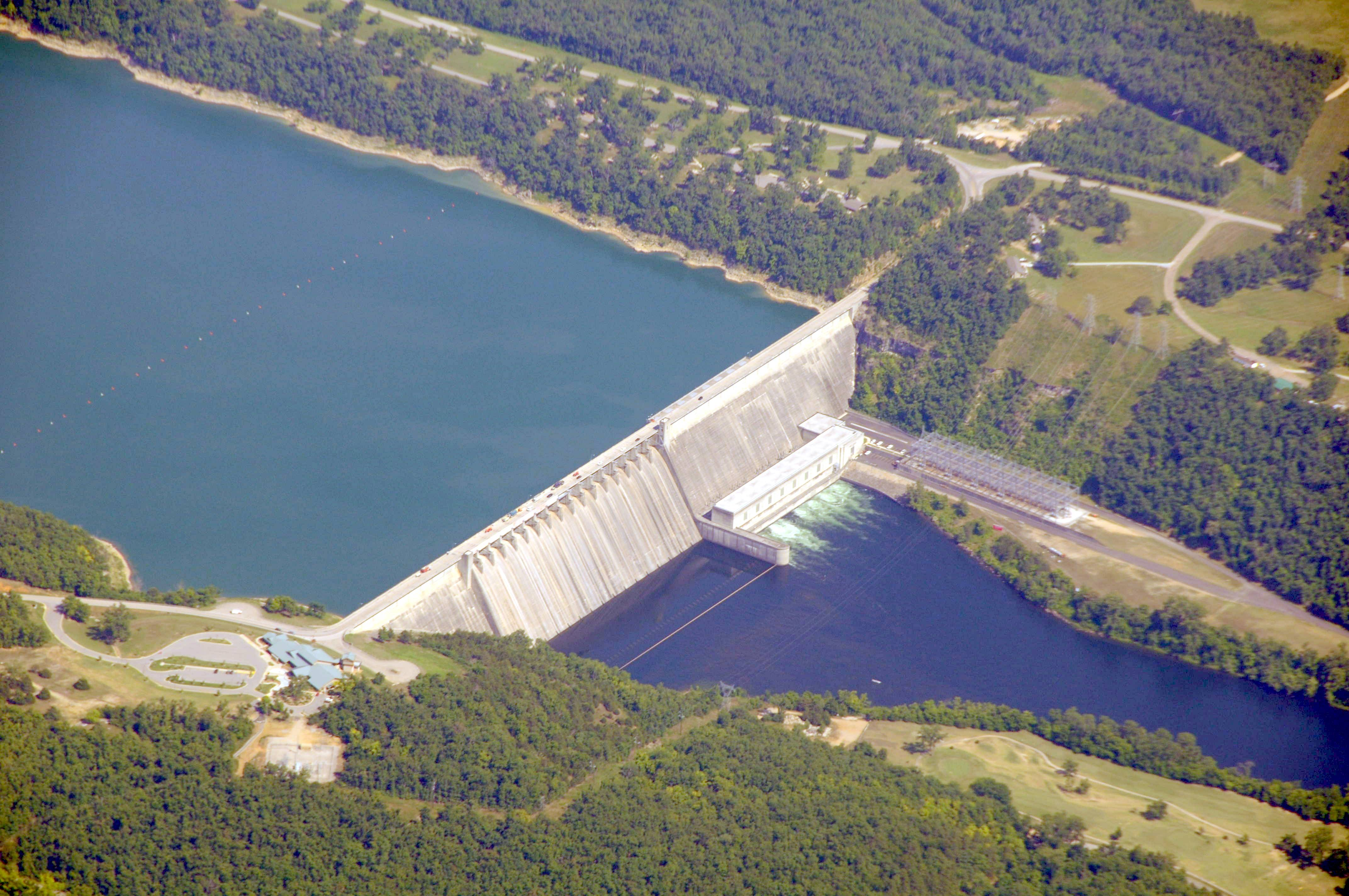
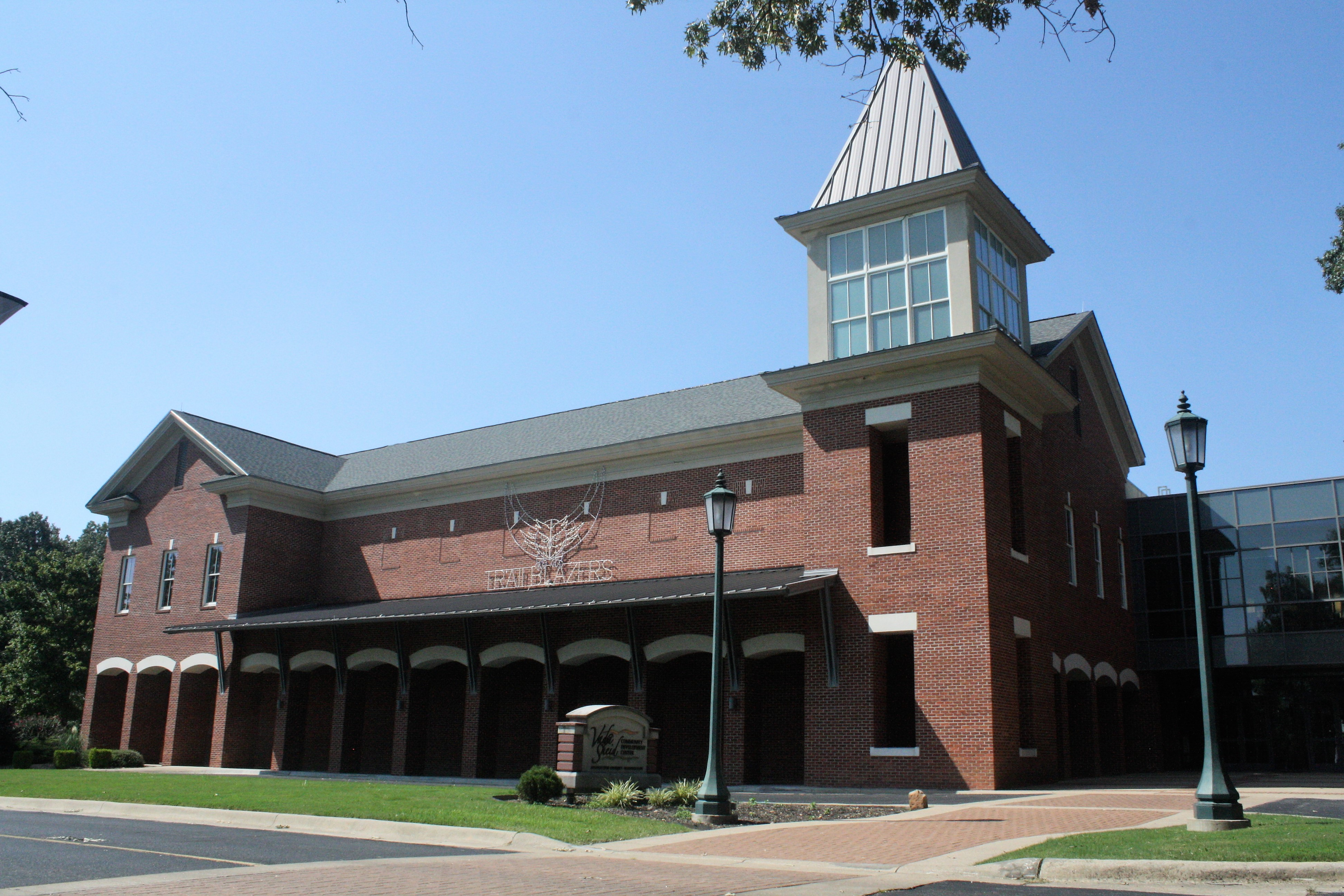
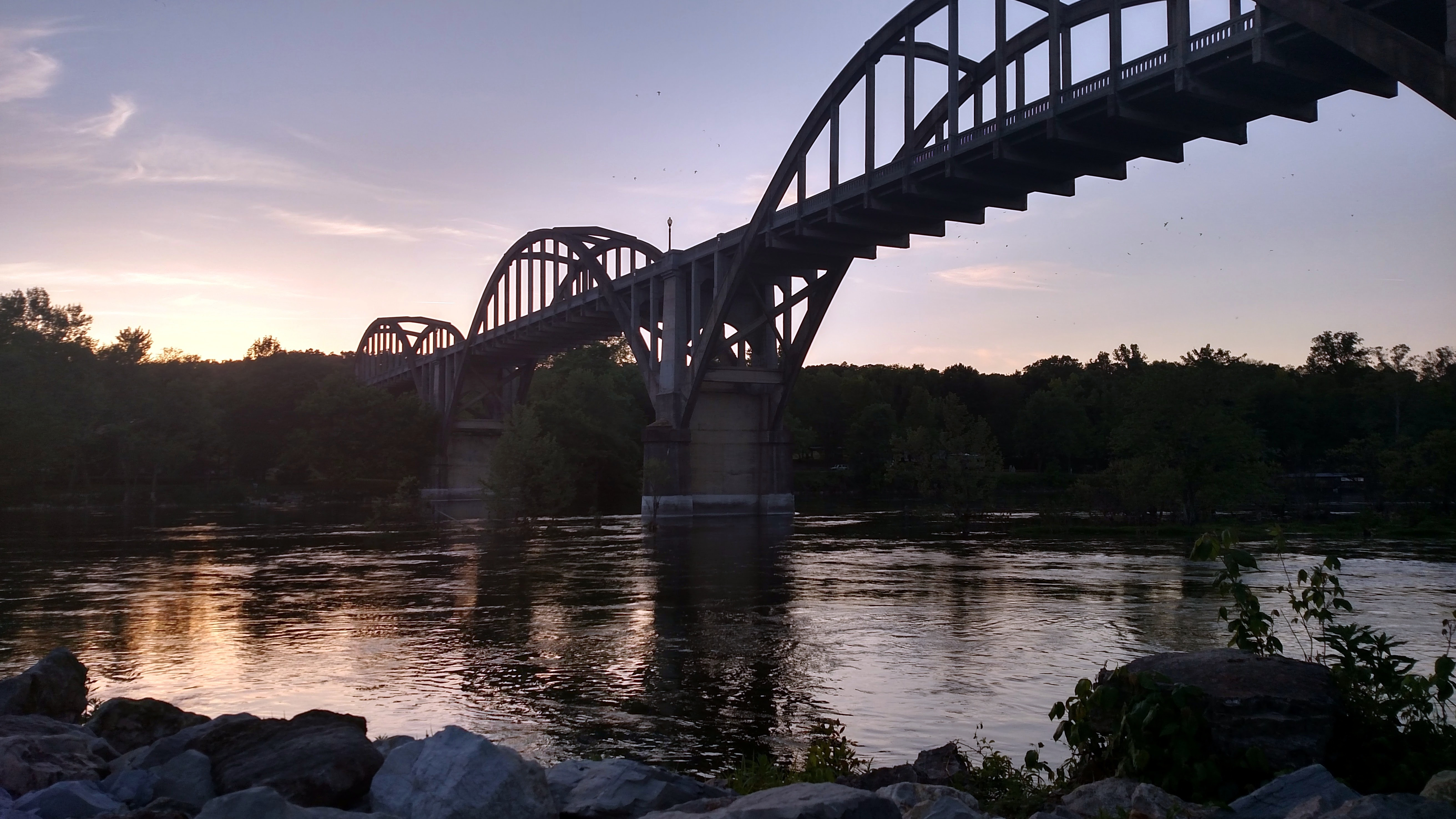
- Clockwise from top: Buffalo River at Buffalo City, the 1825 Jacob Wolf House at Norfork, Vada Sheid Community Development Center on the campus of ASU-Mountain Home, Cotter Bridge over the White River at sunset, Bull Shoals Dam, Baxter County Courthouse in Mountain Home

- Seal

- Location within the U.S. state of Arkansas
- Coordinates: 36°18′25″N 92°21′17″W
- Country: United States
- State: Arkansas
- Founded: March 24, 1873
- Named for: Elisha Baxter
- Seat: Mountain Home
- Largest city: Mountain Home

Area
  - Total: 586.74 sq mi (1,519.6 km^{2})
  - Land: 554.36 sq mi (1,435.8 km^{2})
  - Water: 32.38 sq mi (83.9 km^{2}) 5.5%

Population (2020)
  - Total: 41,627
  - Estimate (2025): 42,982 ▲
  - Density: 75.090/sq mi (28.992/km^{2})
- Time zone: UTC−6 (Central)
  - Summer (DST): UTC−5 (CDT)
- Congressional district: 1st
- Website: Baxter County government's website

Baxter County is a county in the Ozark Mountains of Arkansas. Created as Arkansas's 66th county on March 24, 1873, the county has eight incorporated municipalities, including Mountain Home, its largest city and county seat. The county is named for Elisha Baxter, the tenth governor of Arkansas. It is coterminal with the Mountain Home Micropolitan Statistical Area.

The county is located in a steep section of the Ozark Mountains sometimes known as the Twin Lakes Area because it is bordered by two of Arkansas's largest lakes, Bull Shoals Lake and Norfork Lake. On its southern border are the White River, Norfork Tailwater and the Buffalo National River. Occupying 587 square miles (170,000 ha), the county's population was 41,627 as of the 2020 Census, ranking Baxter the 66th largest and 16th most populous of the 75 counties in Arkansas. The county seat is Mountain Home. The county contains five protected areas, including parts of the Buffalo National River, Ozark National Forest, Bull Shoals-White River State Park, and two Wildlife Management Areas. The natural environment of nearby Norfork and Bull Shoals lakes and the surrounding countryside has attracted tourists from around the country for many years. Educational institutions have also played a role in the life of the community. Other historical features such as the Jacob Wolf House and Cold Water School preserve the history and culture of Baxter County.

Baxter County is served by three public school districts: Mountain Home, Cotter, and Norfork, and contains one public community college: Arkansas State University–Mountain Home (ASUMH). Baxter Health serves as a healthcare hub for the region. Although no Interstate highways serve Baxter County, the county has access to two concurrent United States highways: U.S. Highway 62 (US 62) and US 412, and thirteen Arkansas state highways. Baxter County is served by two public use airports: Baxter County Airport and Gaston's White River Resort Airstrip, two electric service providers, and fifteen public water systems providing potable water to customers in the county.

== History ==
Baxter County was created by the 19th Arkansas General Assembly on March 24, 1873, from parts of Fulton, Izard, Marion, and Searcy counties. It was named for Elisha Baxter, who was governor of Arkansas at the time. The small community of Mountain Home was named temporary county seat; and was later named permanent county seat.

In 1945, Baxter County voted to take the county "dry"—liquor sales prohibited—in 1945 by a vote of 548 to 432. The liquor sales prohibition was overturned in 1978 in the heaviest voter turnout in county history to that date, with 6,175 for the manufacture and sale of intoxicating liquors and 5,991 against. A narrow margin of 184 votes took the county "wet".

== Geography ==
Baxter County is located within the Salem Plateau, a subregion of the Ozark Mountains. Land near Bull Shoals Lake, Norfork Lake, and along the White River are within the White River Hills subregion, known for steep, rocky soils, spring-fed mountain streams, and oak-hickory-pine forest. Eastern Baxter County and a small area around Mountain Home are within the Central Plateau subregion, known for comparatively flatter terrain more suited for hayfields, pastures, and housing, as well as karst.

The county has a total area of 586.74 square miles (1,519.6 km^{2}), of which 554.36 square miles (1,435.8 km^{2}) is land and 32.38 square miles (83.9 km^{2}) (5.5%) is water.

The county is located approximately 110 miles (180 km) southeast of Springfield, Missouri, 152 miles (245 km) north of Little Rock, and 246 miles (396 km) southwest of St. Louis, Missouri. (Note: Mileages from Baxter County to Springfield, Little Rock, and St. Louis are based on highway miles using Mountain Home for Baxter County.) Baxter County is surrounded by sparsely populated Ozark counties on all sides: Fulton County to the east, Izard County to the southeast, Stone County to the south, Searcy County to the southwest, Marion County to the west, and Ozark County, Missouri to the north.

=== Hydrology ===
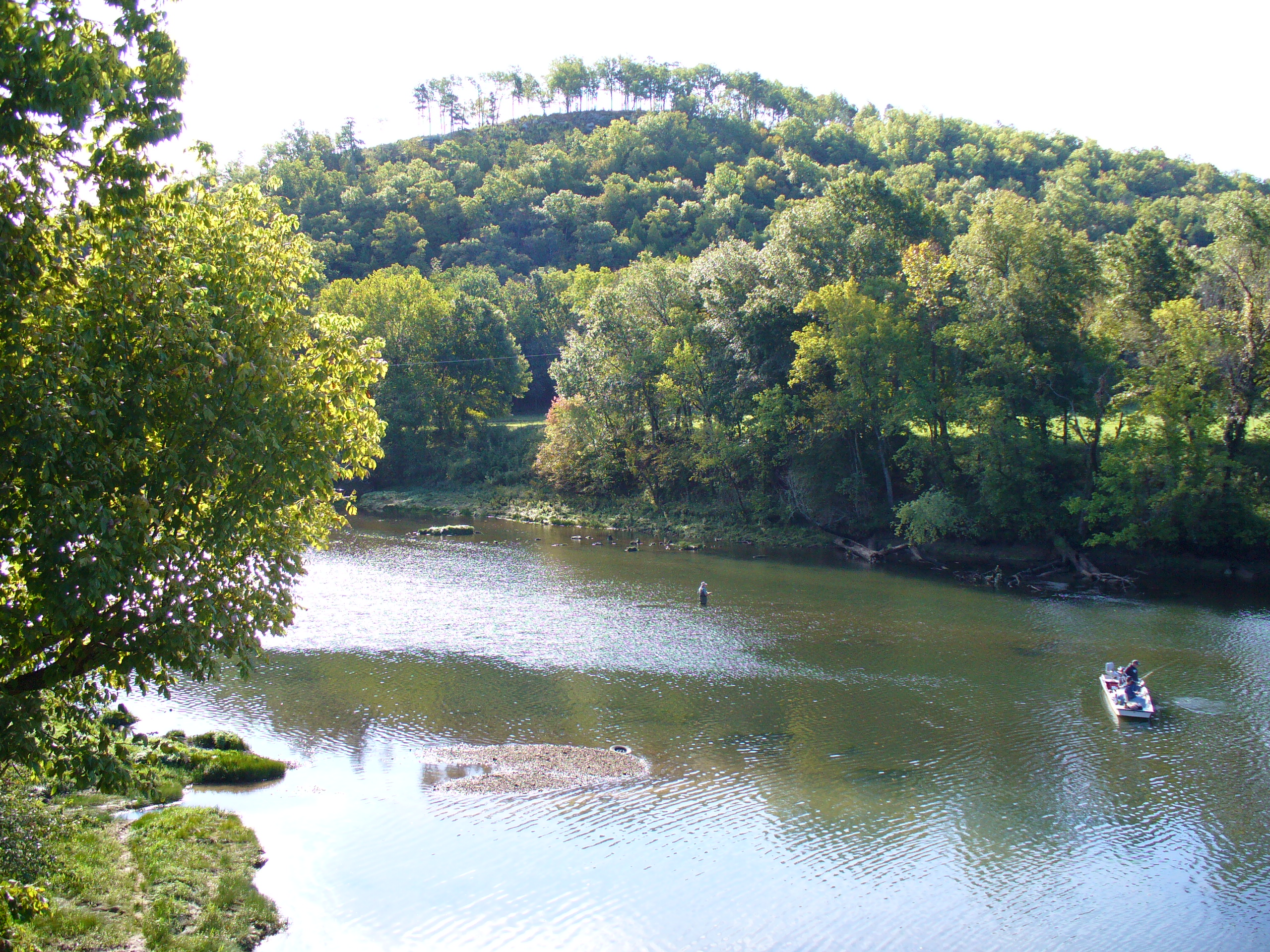
Norfork Tailwater, known for trout fishing

Baxter County is within the White River watershed. The river has several important milestones in Baxter County: beginning along the western boundary of Baxter County, the White River is impounded to form the Bull Shoals Lake reservoir by Bull Shoals Dam, which spans the Baxter-Marion county line. South of the dam, the White River forms the western boundary of Baxter-Marion county line until Buffalo City, when the Buffalo National River empties into the White, with the White continuing across Baxter County from west to east. South of Salesville, the North Fork of White River empties into the White via the Norfork Tailwater downstream of Norfork Dam. Within the county, Barren Fork, Big Creek, Bruce Creek, Hightower Creek, Leatherwood Creek, and Moccasin Creek are important watercourses.

=== Protected areas ===
The Norfork National Fish Hatchery is located at the tailwater of Norfork Dam. Baxter County contains a small section of the Buffalo National River near Buffalo City where the river empties into the White River. Almost all land in Baxter County south of the White River is part of the Ozark National Forest. Within this area, a subdivision of the Ozark National Forest known as the Leatherwood Wilderness is located along Highway 341 (Push Mountain Road). Another part of the Ozark National Forest is also protected in the Sylamore Wildlife Management Area (WMA). The WMA is known as a destination for hiking, fishing, and hunting wild turkey, bear, squirrel, and deer. Camping is available at Blanchard Springs Caverns, Gunner Pool, and Barkshed areas and a gun range is open to the public. The Ozark Highlands Trail passes through the Leatherwood Wilderness and Sylamore WMA.

The Bull Shoals-White River State Park is along the downstream shoreline of Bull Shoals Lake at the Bull Shoals Dam. The park contains campgrounds, a marina, and visitor center. The dam tailwater is well known for trout fishing.

Norfork Lake WMA is a series of protected walk-in hunting areas along Lake Norfork covered in hardwood forest with some pine and ranging topography. The four Baxter County units are Indian Head Unit, Chapin Point Unit, Seward Point Unit, and the Bennett's Creek Unit. The WMA is managed for deer, turkey and small game and attracts waterfowl during migration.

== Demographics ==
Historical population
Census	Pop.	Note	%±
1880	6,004		—
1890	8,527		42.0%
1900	9,298		9.0%
1910	10,389		11.7%
1920	10,216		−1.7%
1930	9,519		−6.8%
1940	10,281		8.0%
1950	11,683		13.6%
1960	9,943		−14.9%
1970	15,319		54.1%
1980	27,409		78.9%
1990	31,186		13.8%
2000	38,386		23.1%
2010	41,513		8.1%
2020	41,627		0.3%
2025 (est.)	42,982	▲	3.3%
U.S. Decennial Census; 1790–1960 1900–1990; 1990–2000 2010–2016

=== 2020 census ===
Racial/Ethnic Makeup of Baxter County treating Hispanics as a Separate Category (2020)
1. White Non-Hispanic (91.4%)
2. Black Non-Hispanic (0.21%)
3. Native American Non-Hispanic (0.52%)
4. Asian Non-Hispanic (0.56%)
5. Pacific Islander Non-Hispanic (0.02%)
6. Other Non-Hispanic (0.00%)
7. Two or more races Non-Hispanic (4.73%)
8. Hispanic Any Race (2.54%)

As of the 2020 census, the county had a population of 41,627. The median age was 52.7 years. 17.5% of residents were under the age of 18 and 31.5% of residents were 65 years of age or older. For every 100 females there were 95.3 males, and for every 100 females age 18 and over there were 92.8 males age 18 and over.

The racial makeup of the county was 92.5% White, 0.2% Black or African American, 0.6% American Indian and Alaska Native, 0.6% Asian, <0.1% Native Hawaiian and Pacific Islander, 0.8% from some other race, and 5.3% from two or more races. Hispanic or Latino residents of any race comprised 2.5% of the population.

42.7% of residents lived in urban areas, while 57.3% lived in rural areas.

There were 18,936 households in the county, of which 21.0% had children under the age of 18 living in them. Of all households, 48.9% were married-couple households, 18.6% were households with a male householder and no spouse or partner present, and 26.6% were households with a female householder and no spouse or partner present. About 31.7% of all households were made up of individuals and 18.1% had someone living alone who was 65 years of age or older.

There were 22,699 housing units, of which 16.6% were vacant. Among occupied housing units, 74.5% were owner-occupied and 25.5% were renter-occupied. The homeowner vacancy rate was 2.4% and the rental vacancy rate was 8.7%.

The median income for a household in the county was $43,504, and the median income for a family was $52,342.

=== 2010 census ===
As of 2010 Baxter County had a population of 41,513. The racial makeup was 95.96% Non-Hispanic whites, 0.16% blacks, 0.56% Native Americans, 0.41% Asians, 0.04% Pacific Islanders, 1.25% Non-Hispanics reporting more than one race and 1.66% Hispanic or Latino.

=== 2000 census ===
As of the 2000 census, there were 38,386 people, 17,052 households, and 11,799 families residing in the county. The population density was 69 people per square mile (27 people/km^{2}). There were 19,891 housing units at an average density of 36 units per square mile (14 units/km^{2}). The racial makeup of the county was 97.81% White, 0.11% Black or African American, 0.52% Native American, 0.34% Asian, 0.02% Pacific Islander, 0.22% from other races, and 0.97% from two or more races. 1.00% of the population were Hispanic or Latino of any race.

There were 17,052 households, out of which 22.00% had children under the age of 18 living with them, 59.00% were married couples living together, 7.70% had a female householder with no husband present, and 30.80% were non-families. 27.50% of all households were made up of individuals, and 15.10% had someone living alone who was 65 years of age or older. The average household size was 2.21 and the average family size was 2.65.

In the county, the population was spread out, with 19.00% under the age of 18, 5.80% from 18 to 24, 21.10% from 25 to 44, 27.40% from 45 to 64, and 26.80% who were 65 years of age or older. The median age was 48 years. For every 100 females there were 92.30 males. For every 100 females age 18 and over, there were 89.10 males.

The median income for a household in the county was $29,106, and the median income for a family was $34,578. Males had a median income of $25,976 versus $18,923 for females. The per capita income for the county was $16,859. About 7.90% of families and 11.10% of the population were below the poverty line, including 14.70% of those under age 18 and 8.90% of those age 65 or over.

== Human resources ==
=== Education ===
The 2019 American Community Survey found 88.7% of Baxter County residents over age 25 held a high school degree or higher and 17.9% holding a bachelor's degree or higher. Baxter County exceeded statewide and nationwide averages for high school attainment (86.6% and 88.0%, respectively), but lags far behind on bachelor's degree attainment (23.0% and 32.1%, respectively).

==== Primary and secondary education ====
Three public school districts are based in Baxter County; Mountain Home School District is the largest school district in Baxter County, with Cotter School District serving the Cotter-Gassville area and the Norfork School District serving the southeast side of the county. Successful completion of the curriculum of these schools leads to graduation from Mountain Home High School, Cotter High School, or Norfork High School respectively. All three high schools are accredited by the Arkansas Department of Education (ADE).

Small areas in Baxter County are within the boundaries of Calico Rock School District, Mountain View School District, and Viola School District.

The Big Flat School District was in the county until July 1, 1985, when it merged with the Fifty Six School District into the Tri-County School District. On July 1, 1993, the Tri-County district was dissolved, with portions going to various districts, including the Mountain View district.

==== Higher education ====
The lone institution of higher education in Baxter County is Arkansas State University-Mountain Home (ASUMH), a public community college. Other nearby institutions include Ozarka College in Melbourne and North Arkansas College in Harrison.

==== Libraries ====
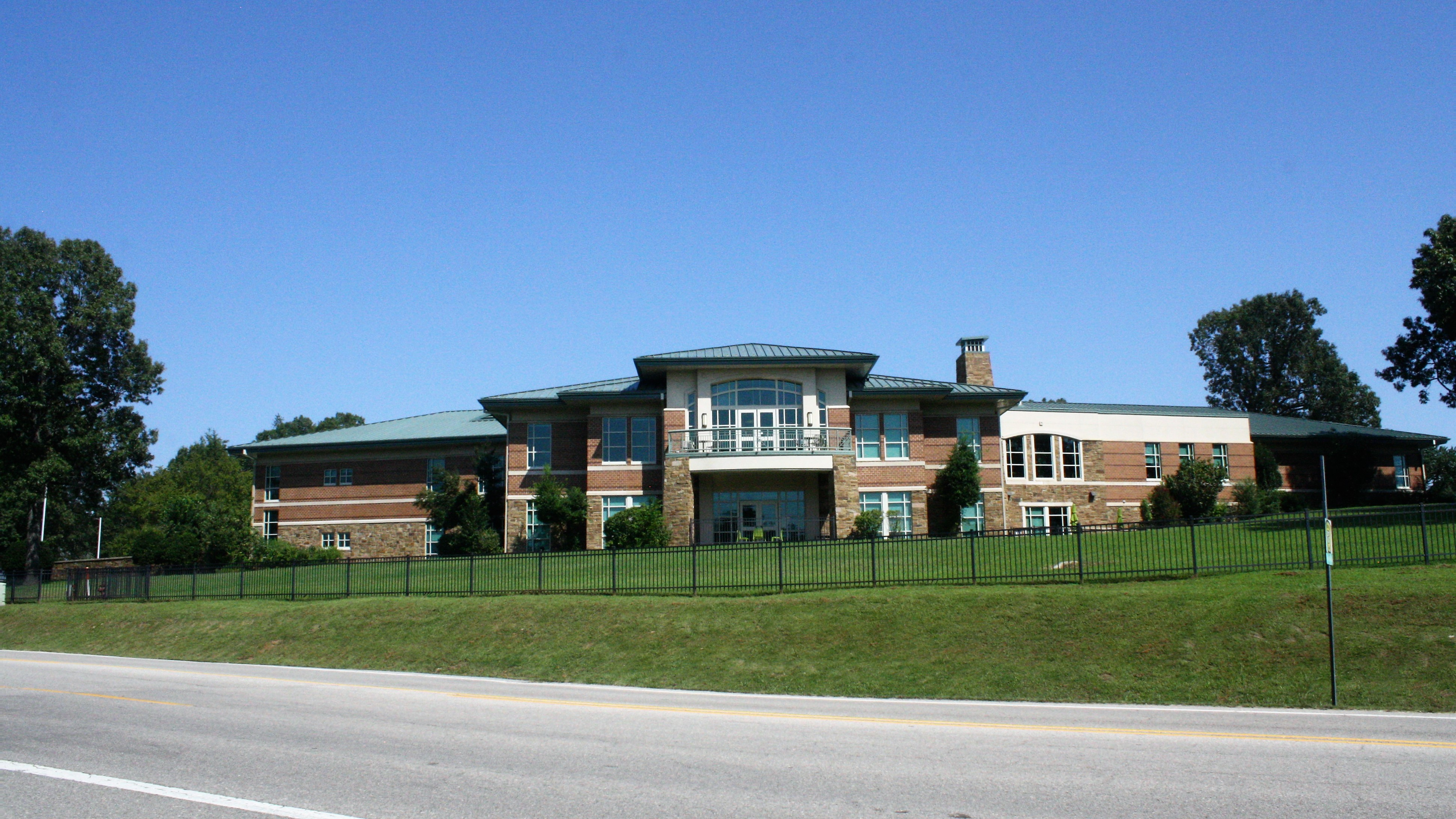
Donald W. Reynolds Library

The Donald W. Reynolds Library serving Baxter County was opened in September 2010 at 300 Library Hill in Mountain Home. The library offers books, e-books, media, reference, programs, youth, special collections, and genealogy services.

=== Public health ===
Baxter Health in Mountain Home offers acute inpatient care, emergency care, diagnostics, surgery, OB/GYN, rehabilitation, therapy, and senior care services. The facility is rated as a Level 3 Trauma Center by the Arkansas Department of Health.

The nearest Level 1 Trauma Centers are CoxHealth and Mercy Hospital Springfield, both in Springfield, Missouri.

=== Public safety ===
The Baxter County Sheriff's Office is the primary law enforcement agency in the county. The agency is led by the Baxter County Sheriff, an official elected by countywide vote every four years. Police departments in Cotter, Gassville, Lakeview, and Mountain Home provide law enforcement in their respective jurisdictions, with remaining municipalities contracting with the Baxter County Sheriff's Office for law enforcement services.

The county is under the jurisdiction of the Baxter County District Court, a state district court. State district courts in Arkansas are courts of original jurisdiction for criminal, civil, and traffic matters. State district courts are presided over by an elected full-time judge. The district court has seven departments, one in each municipality of Baxter County.

Superseding district court jurisdiction is the 14th Judicial Circuit Court, which covers Baxter, Boone, Marion, and Newton counties. The 14th Circuit contains four circuit judges, elected to six-year terms circuitwide.

Fire protection is provided by nineteen agencies in Baxter County, together covering the entire county except areas within the major lakes. Cotter, Gassville, Norfork, and Mountain Home, each provide fire protection, in some cases extending beyond corporate limits. Rural areas are served by the Buford Volunteer, Clarkridge Volunteer, Cotter-Gassville Rural, Gamaliel, Grover Township, Hand Cove Fire Protection District, Henderson, Lone Rock Volunteer, Midway Volunteer, Northeast Lakeside, Oakland-Promise Land Volunteer, Rodney Volunteer, Salesville, Tracy Area, and the United States Forest Service.

== Culture and contemporary life ==
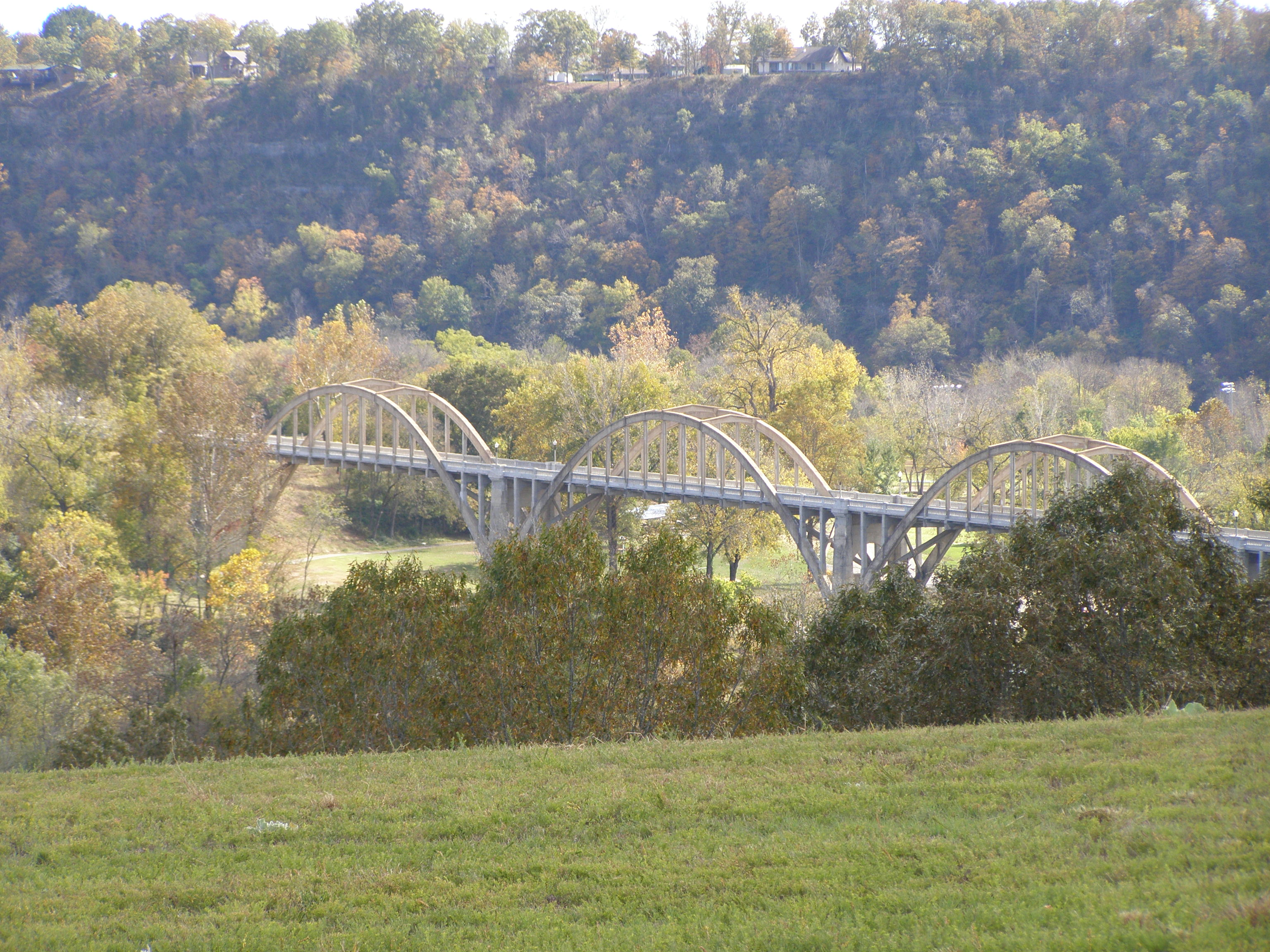
Completion of the Cotter Bridge brought transportation to an insular area of the Ozark Mountains

Baxter County has several facilities, monuments, and museums dedicated to preserving the history and culture of the area. Perhaps one of the most recognizable and important historic structures in Baxter County is the Cotter Bridge over the White River. Upon opening in 1930, the bridge opened Baxter County and north Arkansas to economic development and tourism by providing reliable transportation across the White River.

Two facilities interpret the county's history and heritage: the Jacob Wolf House, a historic log cabin built in 1825, is operated as a historic house museum by the Arkansas Department of Parks, Heritage, and Tourism, and the Baxter County Heritage Center, located in the former Rollins Hospital in downtown Gassville. Five National Register of Historic Places (NRHP, complete county list) properties in the county relate to the history of education: Buford School Building, Cold Water School, and the Horace Mann School Historic District, as well as Big Flat School Gymnasium, Old Cotter High School Gymnasium. Several buildings are preserved for connections to the county's economic and cultural history: Baxter County Courthouse, the Sid Hutcheson Building in Norfork, and several structures in the Mountain Home Commercial Historic District.

=== Annual cultural events ===
Trout fishing enthusiasts visit the White River in Baxter County year-round, with several annual events also celebrating trout fishing: the Cotter Trout Festival in Big Spring Park and the Sowbug Roundup at the Baxter County Fairgrounds are held in May, and the Southern Council Federation of Flyfishers Fair is held on campus at ASUMH in September.

The Mountain Home Farmer's Market operates on the downtown square on Wednesdays and Saturdays, April–November. The Baxter County Fair is one of the most well-attended in Arkansas, and begins with a popular parade through downtown Mountain Home. Norfork Pioneer Days Heritage Festival is held annually on the third Saturday in May at the Jacob Wolf House.

The David's Trail Endurance Run was founded in 2017 as an ultramarathon around Lake Norfork in January.

=== Media ===
The county newspaper is The Baxter Bulletin, a daily newspaper established in Mountain Home in 1901. The first newspaper published in Baxter County was the Quid Nunc, from 1877 to 1880. The Baxter County Citizen was published in Mountain Home from 1880 until 1937. Mountain Home was also home to briefly operated papers named The North Arkansas Herald (monthly, c. 1890) and The Arkansas News (c. 1897).

Cotter has been home to five newspapers over the years, the longest lasting being the Cotter Courier (1903-c. 1918) and The Cotter Record (1911-1937). Publications lasting only a year or so include The White River Headlight, The Screech Owl, and the Bull Shoals Gazette. The Ozark Clarion was briefly published at Three Brothers around 1912, and Norfork Enterprise ran briefly at Norfork.

Baxter County is within the Springfield, Missouri designated market area with the following local TV stations: KYTV (NBC, 33.1 ABC, 33.2 CW SD), KOLR (CBS), KOZK (PBS), KOZL-TV, KWBM, KSPR-LD (ABC), KBNS-CD, and KRBK (Fox).

The county is home to four FM radio stations: KCMH (FM) (91.5 FM, "Keep Christ Most High"), KKTZ (107.5 FM), KTLO-FM (97.9 FM), and KPFM (FM) (105.5 MHz), and one AM radio station: KTLO (AM) (1240 AM).

== Government ==
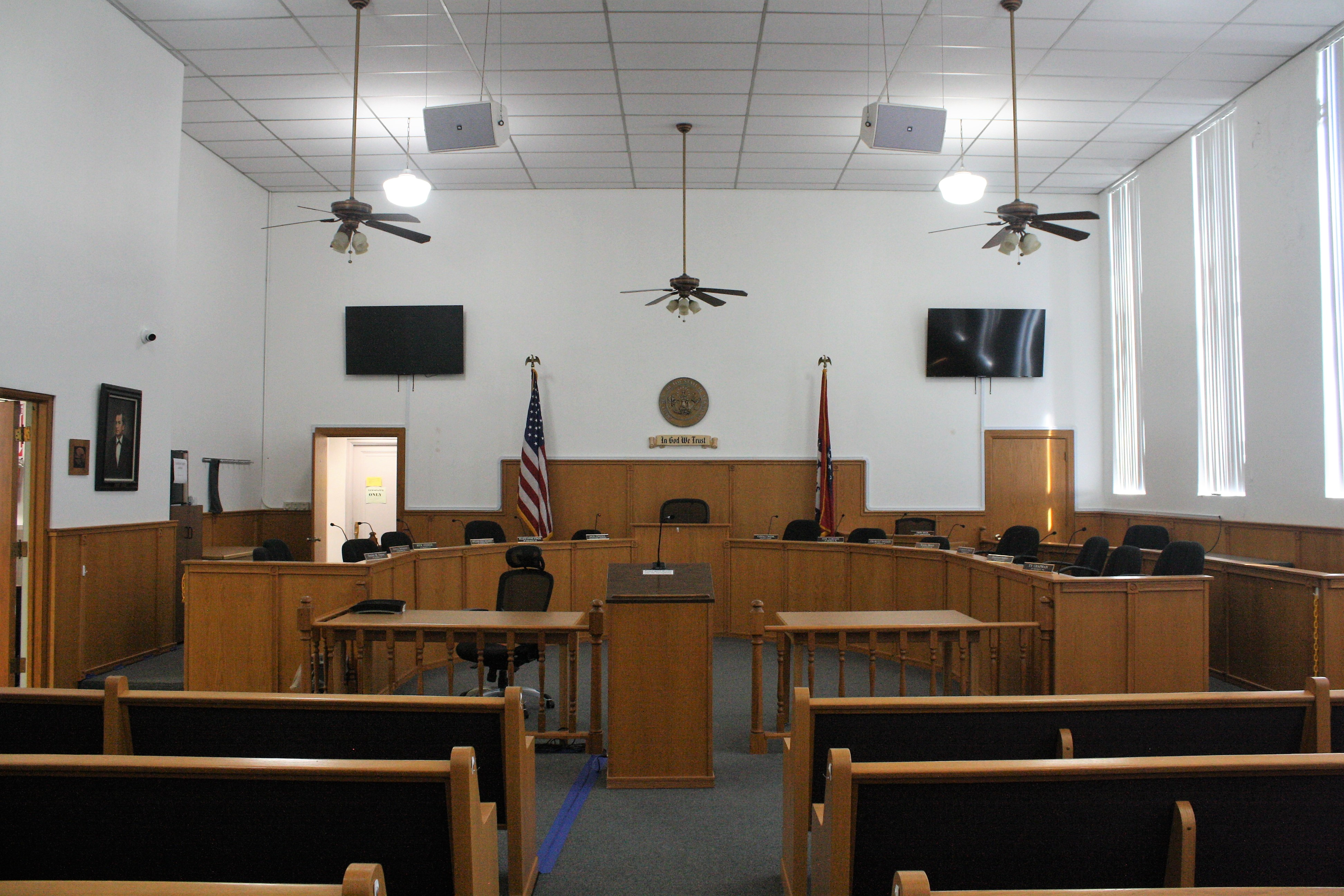
Quorum court meets in the second floor courtroom at the Baxter County Courthouse

The county government is a constitutional body granted specific powers by the Constitution of Arkansas and the Arkansas Code. The quorum court is the legislative branch of the county government and controls all spending and revenue collection. Representatives are called justices of the peace and are elected from county districts every even-numbered year. The number of districts in a county vary from nine to fifteen based on population, and district boundaries are drawn by the Baxter County Election Commission. The Baxter County Quorum Court has eleven members. Presiding over quorum court meetings is the county judge, who serves as the chief operating officer of the county. The county judge is elected at-large and does not vote in quorum court business, although capable of vetoing quorum court decisions.

Baxter County, Arkansas, elected countywide officials
Position	Officeholder	Party
County Judge	Kevin Litty	Republican
County/Circuit Clerk	Canda Reese	Republican
Sheriff	John Montgomery	Republican
Treasurer	Jenay Mize	Republican
Collector	Teresa Smith	Republican
Assessor	Jayme Nicholson	Republican
Coroner	Brad Hays	Republican
Surveyor	Charles Slater	(Unknown)

The composition of the Quorum Court following the 2024 elections is 11 Republicans. Justices of the Peace (members) of the Quorum Court following the elections are:

- District 1: Dennis Frank (R) of Lakeview
- District 2: Mike McDonald (R) of Mountain Home
- District 3: Rick Steiner (R) of Mountain Home
- District 4: Dirk Waldrop (R) of Mountain Home
- District 5: Maryanne Edge (R) of Mountain Home
- District 6: Lisa House (R) of Gassville
- District 7: Bob Nault (R) of Mountain Home
- District 8: Eddie Griffin (R) of Mountain Home
- District 9: Cameron Davis (R) of Mountain Home
- District 10: Shannon Walker (R) of Gassville
- District 11: Eric Payne (R) of Norfork

Additionally, the townships of Baxter County are entitled to elect their own respective constables, as set forth by the Constitution of Arkansas. Constables are largely of historical significance as they were used to keep the peace in rural areas when travel was more difficult. The township constables as of the 2024 elections are:

- District 1: Douglas Stephenson (R)
- District 2: Nathan Horn (R)
- District 3: Kaleb Johnson (R)
- District 4: Julie Little (R)
- District 5: Bradley Beard (R)
- District 6: Ryan Beasley (R)
- District 7: Cade Seal (R)
- District 8: Tyler Brown (R)
- District 9: Billy Cox (R)
- District 10: Ronald Weaver (R)
- District 11: Frankie Baker (R)

== Politics ==
In the Arkansas Senate, Baxter County is within the 23rd District, which also contains Marion County and parts of Boone, Fulton, and Izard counties, and has been represented by Scott Flippo (R) since 2015. In the Arkansas House of Representatives, Baxter County is split among three districts: the 3rd District (Stetson Painter, R, since 2023), the 4th District (Jack Fortner, R, since 2023), and the 27th (Steven Walker, R, since 2023).

At the presidential level, Baxter County was ancestrally reliably Democratic, voting for the Democratic nominee in every election through 1952. In 1956, Baxter County backed Republican Dwight D. Eisenhower, and ever since it has grown increasingly Republican, being one of only three counties in the state to support Gerald Ford against Jimmy Carter in 1976. The only Democrat after 1948 to win a majority was Lyndon Johnson in 1964, and the only subsequent Democrat to carry Baxter County was Arkansas native Bill Clinton in 1992.

United States presidential election results for Baxter County, Arkansas
Year	Republican		Democratic		Third party(ies)	
Year	No.	%	No.	%	No.	%
1896	262	21.06%	980	78.78%	2	0.16%
1900	287	28.28%	723	71.23%	5	0.49%
1904	236	34.40%	426	62.10%	24	3.50%
1908	300	30.74%	607	62.19%	69	7.07%
1912	142	14.26%	536	53.82%	318	31.93%
1916	318	25.81%	914	74.19%	0	0.00%
1920	484	38.38%	707	56.07%	70	5.55%
1924	301	27.29%	640	58.02%	162	14.69%
1928	504	42.71%	665	56.36%	11	0.93%
1932	194	15.47%	1,039	82.85%	21	1.67%
1936	375	32.47%	773	66.93%	7	0.61%
1940	489	36.09%	859	63.39%	7	0.52%
1944	572	41.69%	796	58.02%	4	0.29%
1948	553	31.42%	1,098	62.39%	109	6.19%
1952	1,387	49.66%	1,388	49.70%	18	0.64%
1956	1,721	53.92%	1,451	45.46%	20	0.63%
1960	2,108	54.34%	1,694	43.67%	77	1.99%
1964	1,986	40.61%	2,900	59.29%	5	0.10%
1968	3,401	49.53%	1,952	28.43%	1,513	22.04%
1972	6,754	70.65%	2,677	28.00%	129	1.35%
1976	5,885	50.51%	5,766	49.49%	0	0.00%
1980	9,684	63.93%	4,789	31.62%	674	4.45%
1984	10,870	69.84%	4,528	29.09%	166	1.07%
1988	8,614	63.35%	4,808	35.36%	175	1.29%
1992	5,640	35.85%	6,991	44.44%	3,101	19.71%
1996	6,877	44.35%	6,703	43.23%	1,925	12.42%
2000	9,538	57.09%	6,516	39.00%	654	3.91%
2004	11,128	60.05%	7,129	38.47%	273	1.47%
2008	12,852	64.32%	6,539	32.73%	590	2.95%
2012	13,688	70.78%	5,172	26.74%	479	2.48%
2016	14,682	74.28%	4,169	21.09%	915	4.63%
2020	15,836	75.38%	4,635	22.06%	536	2.55%
2024	16,253	77.57%	4,341	20.72%	360	1.72%

=== Taxation ===
Property tax is assessed by the Baxter County Assessor annually based upon the fair market value of the property and determining which tax rate, commonly called a millage in Arkansas, will apply. The rate depends upon the property's location with respect to city limits, school district, and special tax increment financing (TIF) districts. This tax is collected by the Baxter County Collector between the first business day of March of each year through October 15 without penalty. The Baxter County Treasurer disburses tax revenues to various government agencies, such as cities, county road departments, fire departments, libraries, and police departments in accordance with the budget set by the quorum court.

Sales and use taxes in Arkansas are voter approved and collected by the Arkansas Department of Finance and Administration. Arkansas's statewide sales and use tax has been 6.5% since July 1, 2013. Baxter County has an additional sales and use tax of 1.25% since January 1, 2019. Within Baxter County, the City of Mountain Home has had an additional 2.125% sales and use tax since July 1, 2021, and Cotter has had an additional 2% since January 1, 2022, with the remaining incorporated communities having 1.00% sales and use tax rates. The Arkansas State Treasurer disburses tax revenue to counties/cities in accordance with tax rules.

== Communities ==
Seven incorporated cities and one town are located within the county. The largest city and county seat is Mountain Home, located centrally between Bull Shoals Lake and Lake Norfork. Mountain Home had a population of 12,825 at the 2020 census and is the focal point of the Mountain Home, AR, Micropolitan Statistical Area, which includes all of Baxter County. Cotter and Gassville are located west of Mountain Home. Briarcliff, Norfork, and Salesville are small towns with populations under 1,000 south of Mountain Home. Lakeview is a small municipality on Bull Shoals Lake. The small town of Big Flat is located in the southern part of Baxter County, and partly in Searcy County.

The United States Census Bureau has also designated four unincorporated communities as Census-designated places: Gamaliel and Henderson near Norfork Lake, Buffalo City near the Buffalo National River, and Midway between Mountain Home and Lakeview.

=== Other unincorporated communities ===
Baxter County has dozens of unincorporated communities and ghost towns within its borders. This is due to early settlers in Arkansas tending to settle in small clusters rather than incorporated towns. Some communities, including Bennett's, Cumi, Custer, and Hand were inundated during creation of Lake Norfork. For example, communities like Clarkridge and Monkey Run had a post office or other buildings at some point in their history. Other communities are simply a few dwellings at a crossroads, or a residential area near a cove or point on the lake that have adopted a common place name over time. Some are officially listed as populated places by the United States Geological Survey, and others are listed as historic settlements.

- Advance
- Amos
- Arkana
- Arkawana
- Buford
- Cartney
- Colfax
- County Line
- Culp
- Diamond Bay
- Dogwood Park
- Fawn Park
- Heritage Estates
- Holiday Hills
- Jordan
- Kingswood Estates
- Lakeside Terrace
- Lone Rock
- Mallard Point
- McPhearson
- Norfork Lake Estates
- Norfork Village
- Old Joe
- Rodney
- Shady Grove
- Shipp
- Spring Lake Estates
- Sycamore Heights
- Sycamore Spring
- Three Brothers
- Timber Lake Manor
- Whiteville
- Woods Point Landing

=== Historic communities ===
- Berry
- Casteel
- Chastain
- Conville
- Covey
- Herron
- Independence
- Jonesdale
- Laytonville
- Spencer
- Wake

=== Townships ===
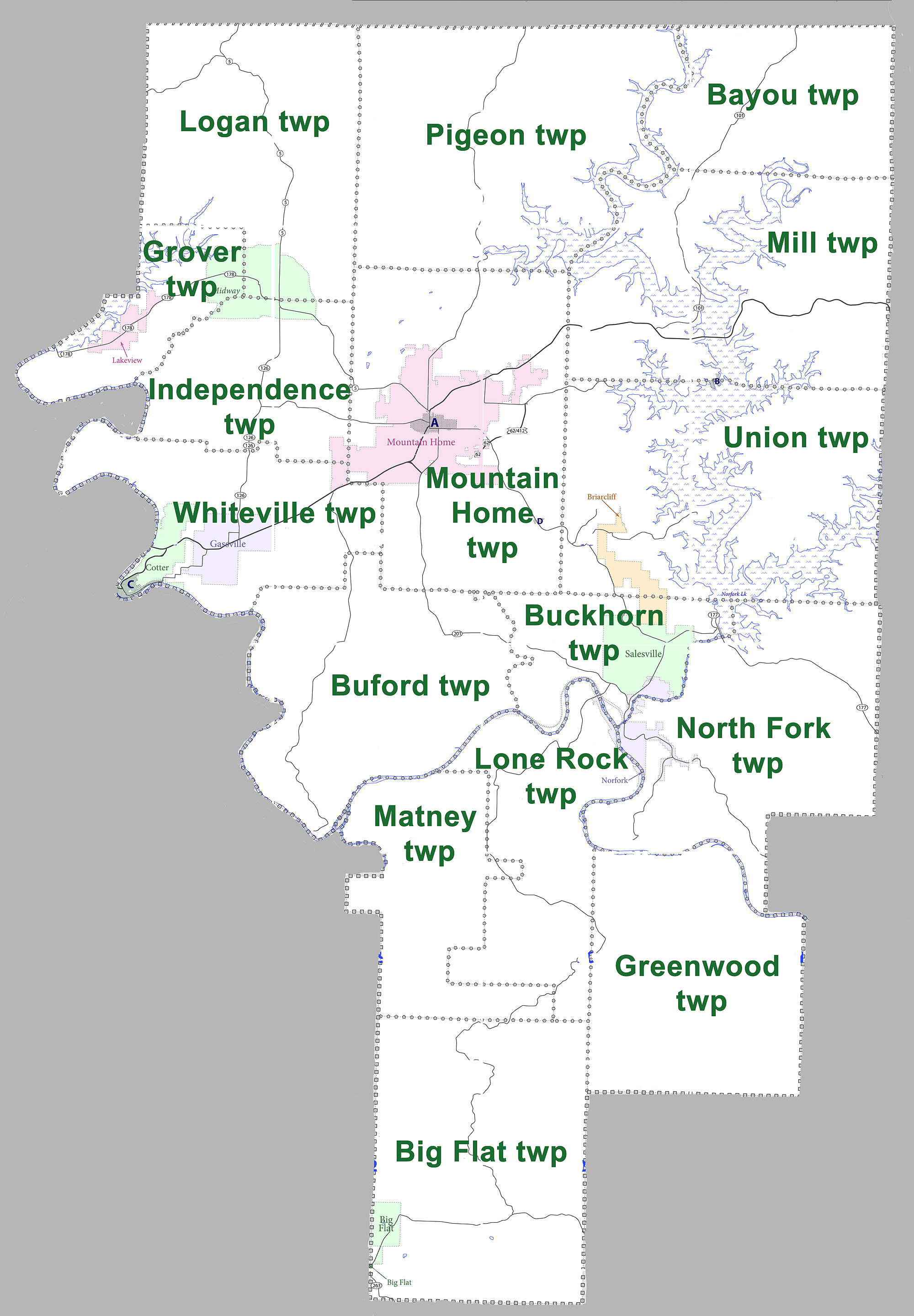
Townships in Baxter County, Arkansas, as of 2010

Townships in Arkansas are the divisions of a county. Each township includes unincorporated areas; some may have incorporated cities or towns within part of their boundaries. Arkansas townships have limited purposes in modern times. However, the United States census does list Arkansas population based on townships (sometimes referred to as "county subdivisions" or "minor civil divisions"). Townships are also of value for historical purposes in terms of genealogical research. Each town or city is within one or more townships in an Arkansas county based on census maps and publications. The townships of Baxter County are listed below; listed in parentheses are the cities, towns, and/or census-designated places that are fully or partially inside the township.

Township	FIPS code	ANSI code (GNIS ID)	Population center(s)	Pop. (2010)	Pop. density (/mi^{2})	Pop. density (/km^{2})	Land area (mi^{2})	Land area (km^{2})	Water area (mi^{2})	Water area (km^{2})	Geographic coordinates
Bayou	05-90165	00069555		360	13.90	5.37	25.900	67.08	1.045	2.707	36.467714°N 92.209491°W
Big Flat	05-90288	00069556	Big Flat	198	4.15	1.6	47.761	123.7	0.021	0.05439	36.026753°N 92.358551°W
Buckhorn	05-90525	00069557	Briarcliff, Norfork, Salesville	969	58.71	22.67	16.504	42.75	0.739	1.914	36.237454°N 92.291449°W
Buford	05-90540	00069558		1295	32.86	12.69	39.415	102.1	0.553	1.432	36.232621°N 92.418200°W
Greenwood	05-91524	00069559		164	4.32	1.67	37.929	98.24	0.300	0.7770	36.110093°N 92.256098°W
Grover	05-91548	00069560	Lakeview, Midway	2438	186.23	71.92	13.091	33.91	2.123	5.499	36.380141°N 92.529738°W
Independence	05-91818	00069561	Midway, Mountain Home	1891	59.06	32.3	32.018	82.93	0.027	0.06993	36.352625°N 92.474704°W
Logan	05-92247	00069562	Midway	1566	38.29	14.78	40.898	105.9	0.092	0.2383	36.443895°N 92.473419°W
Lone Rock	05-92265	00069563		415	15.05	5.81	27.566	71.40	0.490	1.269	36.167387°N 92.319143°W
Matney	05-92424	00069564		107	4.40	1.70	24.297	62.93	0.186	0.4817	36.140874°N 92.401774°W
Mill	05-92460	00069565		2478	58.82	22.71	42.125	109.1	9.032	23.39	36.392563°N 92.228985°W
Mountain Home	05-92616	00069566	Mountain Home	19659	376.61	145.40	52.200	135.2	0.090	0.2331	36.335503°N 92.370086°W
North Fork	05-92709	00069567	Norfork	1574	37.66	14.54	41.793	108.2	1.259	3.261	36.199399°N 92.222462°W
Pigeon	05-92877	00069568		1850	35.87	13.85	51.570	133.6	3.516	9.106	36.446831°N 92.352986°W
Union	05-94062	00069099	Briarcliff	1856	44.08	17.02	42.101	109.0	12.305	31.87	36.282254°N 92.221680°W
Whiteville	05-94035	00069570	Cotter, Gassville, Mountain Home	4693	164.48	63.50	28.533	73.90	0.591	1.531	36.296363°N 92.492255°W
Source: U.S. Census Bureau

== Infrastructure ==
=== Aviation ===
The county contains one public owned/public use airport: Baxter County Airport, a small, rural airport west of Mountain Home with over 11,000 annual operations, almost entirely general aviation. The county contains three private airfields, including Gaston's White River Resort Airstrip, which is available for public use. The nearest commercial service airport is Springfield–Branson National Airport.

=== Major highways ===
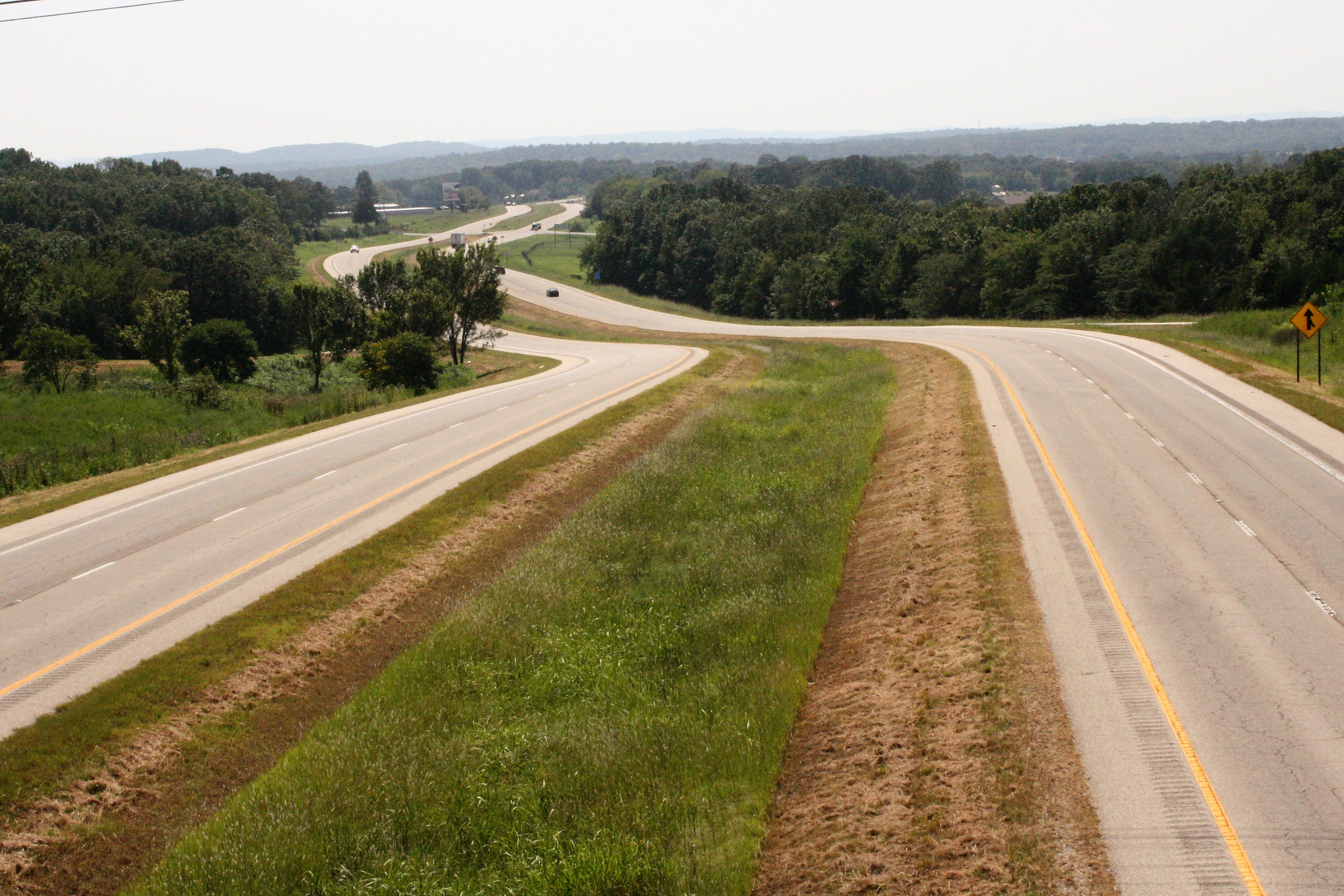
US 62/US 412 serves Mountain Home between two winding, rural segments through the Ozark Mountains

- US 62 / US 412
- AR 5
- AR 14
- AR 101
- AR 126
- AR 177
- AR 178
- AR 201
- AR 202
- AR 263
- AR 341
- AR 342
- AR 345

=== Rail ===
The Missouri and Northern Arkansas Railroad crosses the county along the White River, including a rail yard in Cotter.

=== Utilities ===
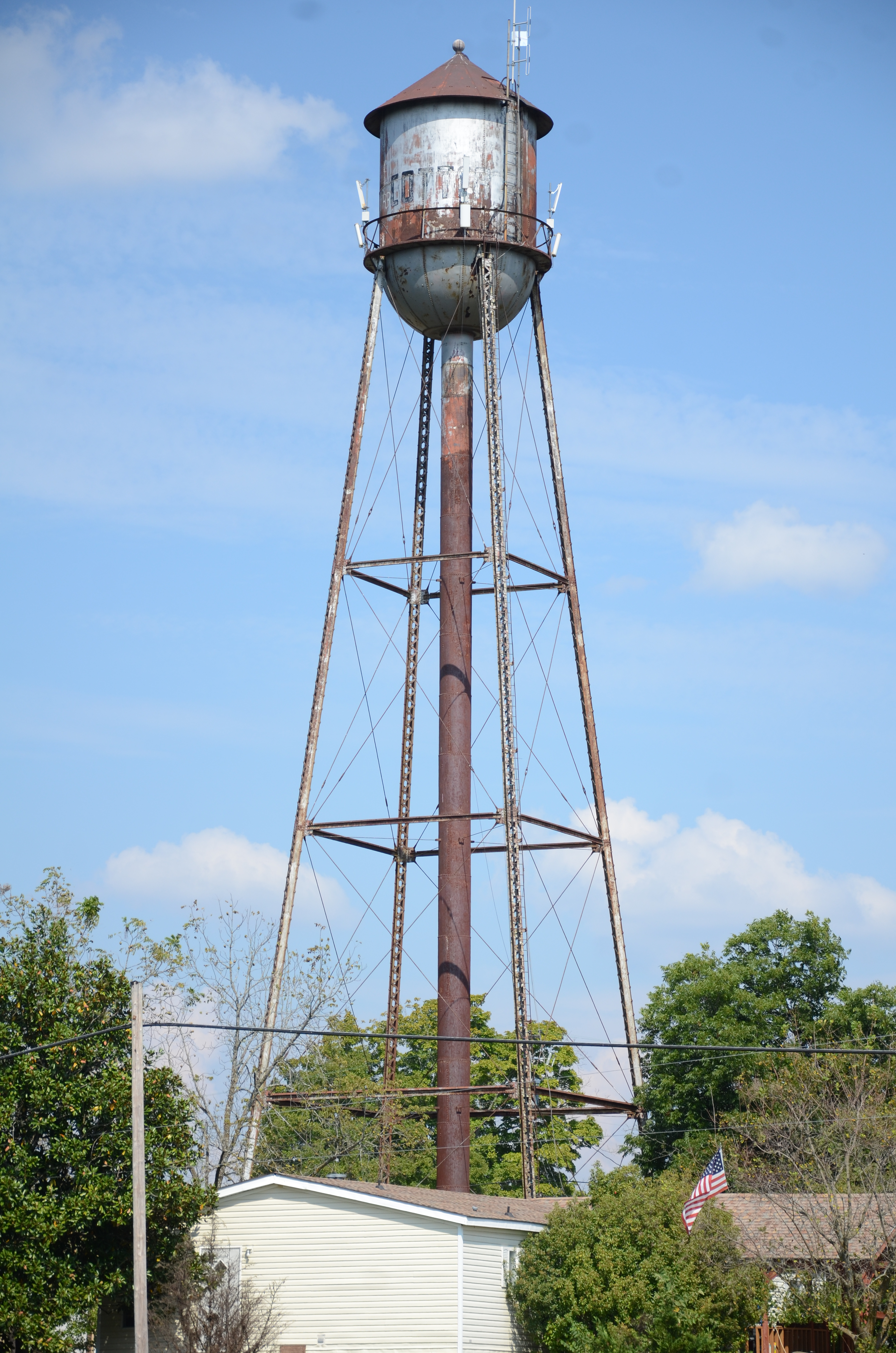
Historic Cotter Water Tower listed on the National Register of Historic Places

The North Arkansas Electric Cooperative, based in Salem, is a non-profit electric utility cooperative serving much of the Arkansas Ozarks, including the rural areas of Baxter County with electric service. Entergy Arkansas provides electricity for Mountain Home, Cotter, Gassville, and nearby populated outlying areas, and the area around Big Flat.

The Arkansas Department of Health (ADH) is responsible for the regulation and oversight of public water systems throughout the state. Nine community water systems are based in Baxter County: Baxter-Marion Rural Water Association No. 1 (BMRWA #1), Big Flat Water System, City of Briarcliff, Community Water Association, City of Cotter, City of Gassville, Lakeview Midway Public Water Authority, City of Mountain Home Water & Wastewater Department, City of Norfork Water Department, and Northeast Public Water Authority. There are also six minor systems serving residential areas: Autumn Acres Mobile Home Park (MHP), Crestwood MHP, Edgewood Bay Association, Laurelwood Homeowners Association, Starlight Estates, and Tall Oaks MHP.

== Notable residents ==
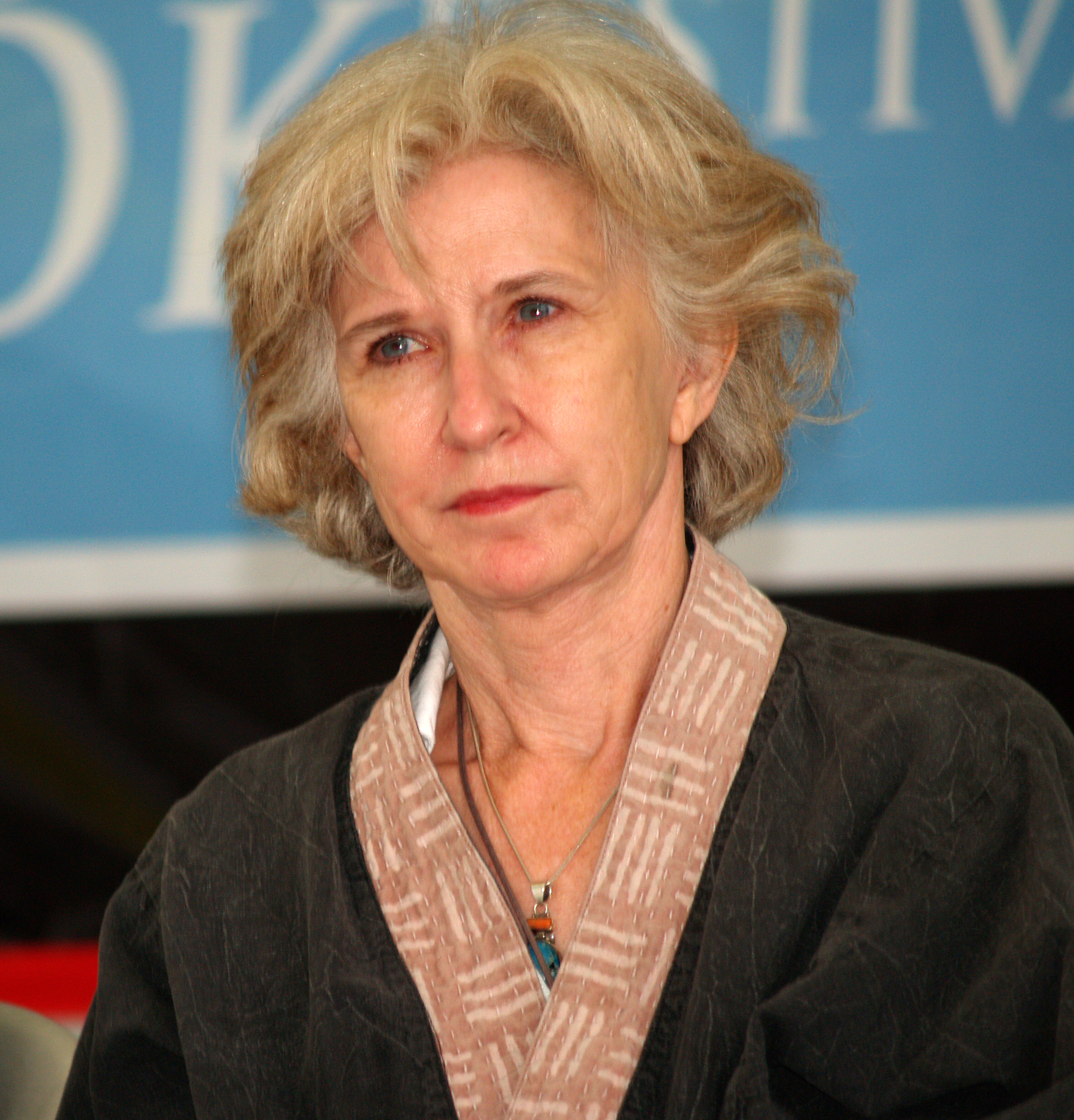
Carolyn D. Wright, poet

- Richard Antrim, naval rear admiral, World War II veteran and Medal of Honor recipient
- Lonnie D. Bentley, professor and the head of the Department of Computer and Information Technology at Purdue University
- Robbie Branscum, writer of children's books and young adult fiction
- William U. McCabe, represented Baxter County in the Arkansas Senate from 1921 to 1924, and in the Arkansas House of Representatives in 1931 until his death
- Vada Sheid, longtime member of the Arkansas General Assembly representing Baxter County
- Carolyn D. Wright – poet, born in Mountain Home

== See also ==
- National Register of Historic Places listings in Baxter County, Arkansas
