= Oak Mound, Missouri =

Unincorporated community in Missouri, U.S.

Coordinates: 36°40′56″N 92°10′42″W

Oak Mound is an unincorporated community in eastern Ozark County, in the Ozarks of south-central Missouri, United States. The community was located on Bond Ridge and the Oak Mound Cemetery lies adjacent to the south side of Missouri Route KK. The North Fork of the White River lies just over one mile west of the site.

== History ==
A post office called Oak Mound was established in 1888, and remained in operation until 1932. The name "Oak Mound" is descriptive of the original town site.
