= Van Buren Tate =

American politician (1837–1900)

Van Buren Tate (December 22, 1837 – July 5, 1900) was a minister in the Methodist Episcopal Church, a farmer, and a state legislator in Arkansas. He represented Baxter County in the Arkansas House of Representatives in 1881. He chaired the Committee on Elections.

Tate died on July 5, 1900, in Palmer, Texas.
