= Marble, Arkansas =

Unincorporated community in Arkansas, US

- Unincorporated community
- Marble's position in Arkansas Marble, Arkansas (the United States)
- Coordinates: 36°08′23″N 93°35′15″W
- Country: United States
- State: Arkansas
- County: Madison
- Elevation: 1,345 ft (410 m)
- Time zone: UTC-6 (Central (CST))
  - Summer (DST): UTC-5 (CDT)
- Postal code: 72740
- GNIS feature ID: 58121

Marble is an unincorporated community in northeastern Madison County, Arkansas, United States. The community is located on U.S. Route 412 and the southwest bank of the Kings River.

Marble was built up chiefly after the Civil War. The community was named for the valuable marble mined in the vicinity.

== See also ==
- Cartney, Arkansas, similar community in Baxter County, Arkansas
