= Norfork National Fish Hatchery =

Fish hatchery in Arkansas, United States

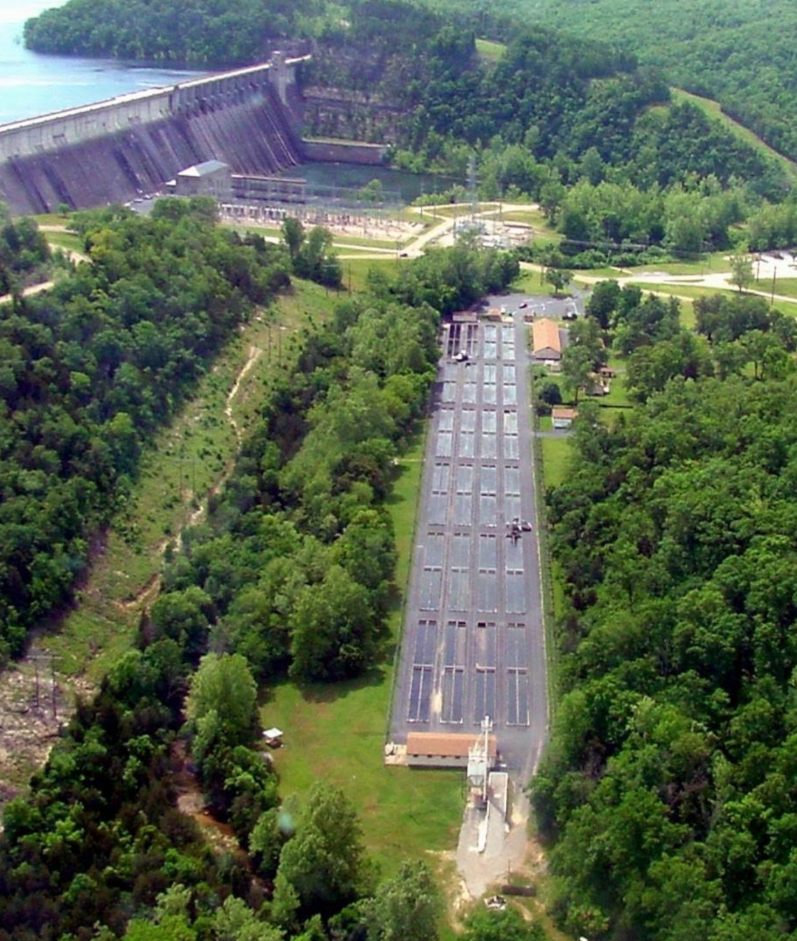

- Location within Arkansas Location within the United States
- Location: Salesville, Arkansas, United States
- Coordinates: 36°15′4″N 92°14′43″W
- Established: 1955
- Named for: Lake Norfork
- Governing body: United States Fish and Wildlife Service
- Website: www.fws.gov/fish-hatchery/norfork

The Norfork National Fish Hatchery is a fish hatchery located in Salesville, Arkansas in the Ozark Mountains, United States. It is managed and operated by the United States Fish and Wildlife Service. Like other components of the National Fish Hatchery System, the hatchery's mission is to conserve, protect, and enhance fish, wildlife, plants, and their habitats, as well to cooperate with like-minded partners to further these goals. As of 2025, its specific purpose is to support recreational fishing by producing brown trout (salmo trutta), cutthroat trout (oncorhynchus clarkia), rainbow trout (oncorhynchus mykiss), and snuffbox mussels (epioblasma triquetra) for stocking in the tailwaters of Norfork Dam and other White River-basin dam tailwaters.

== See also ==
- National Fish Hatchery System
- List of National Fish Hatcheries in the United States
