= Mountain Home Commercial Historic District =

Historic district in Arkansas, United States

- U.S. National Register of Historic Places
- U.S. Historic district
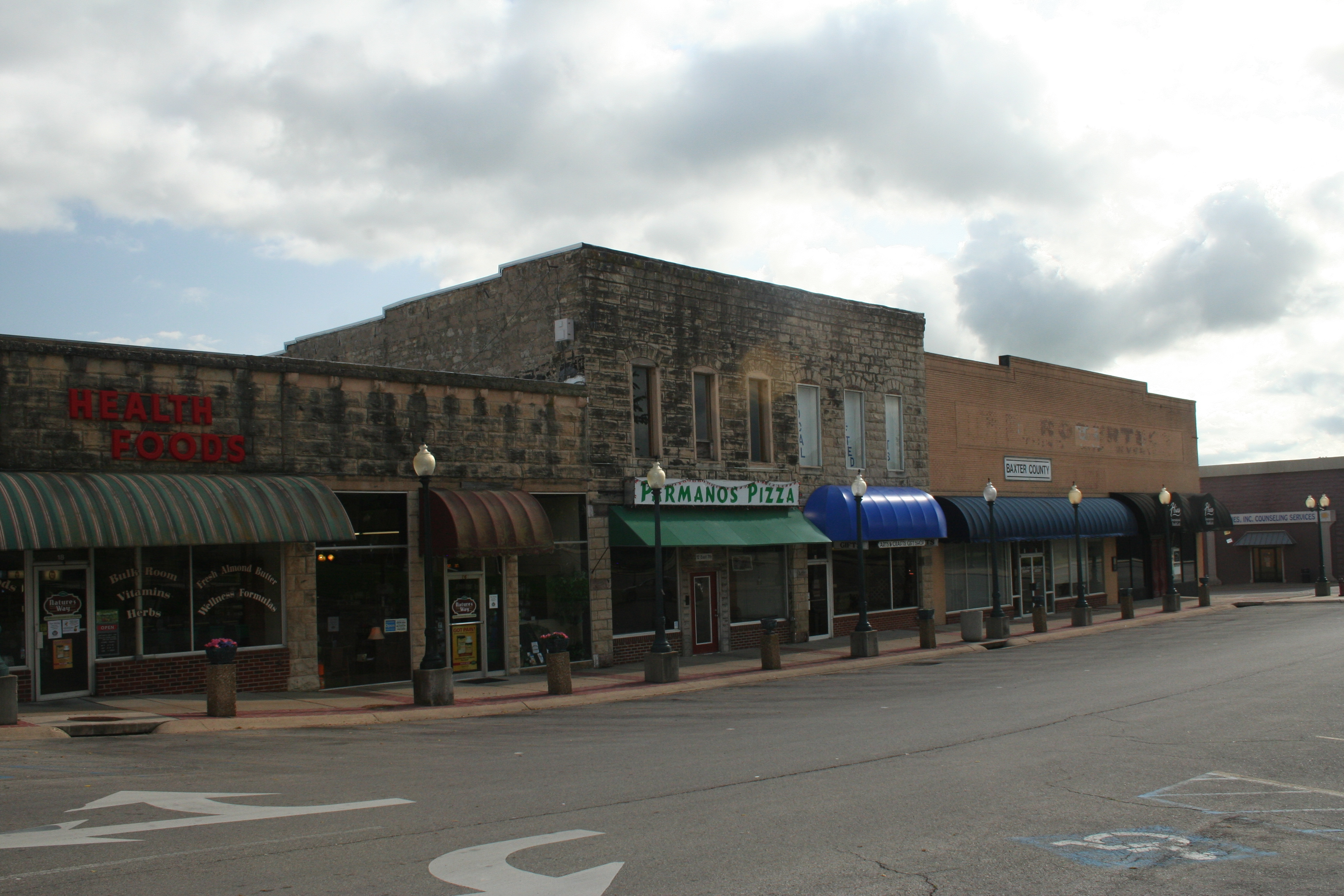
- South side of the courthouse square

- Location within Arkansas Location within the United States
- Location: Roughly bounded on the N by E 5th St, E 9th St on the S, S St on the E, and Hickory St on the W, Mountain Home, Arkansas
- Coordinates: 36°20′04″N 92°23′04″W
- Area: 16.4 acres (6.6 ha)
- Built: 1941
- Architect: T. Ewing Shelton,
- Architectural style: Early Commercial, Art Deco
- NRHP reference No.: 10000348
- Added to NRHP: June 15, 2010

The Mountain Home Commercial Historic District encompasses the historic central business district of Mountain Home, Arkansas, the county seat of Baxter County. The district is centered on the Baxter County Courthouse, and is bounded on the north by East 5th Street, the south by East 9th Street, the east by South Street, and the west by South Hickory Street. Most of the buildings in this area are commercial structures, one or two stories in height, of masonry construction. They are generally vernacular in style, and most were built in one of two periods: between about 1900 and 1920, after the arrival of the railroad, and in the 1950s, when the city experienced another major period of growth. The oldest building is the 1892 Baker Building at 601-603 Baker Street.

The district was listed on the National Register of Historic Places in 2010.

== See also ==
- National Register of Historic Places listings in Baxter County, Arkansas
