= Bayou Township, Baxter County, Arkansas =

Bayou Township
- Township
- Location in Arkansas Bayou Township (the United States)
- Coordinates: 36°28′04″N 92°12′34″W
- Country: United States
- State: Arkansas
- County: Baxter

Area
  - Total: 26.945 sq mi (69.79 km^{2})
  - Land: 25.900 sq mi (67.08 km^{2})
  - Water: 1.045 sq mi (2.71 km^{2})
- Elevation: 732 ft (223 m)

Population (2010)
  - Total: 360
  - Density: 14/sq mi (5.4/km^{2})
- Time zone: UTC-6 (CST)
  - Summer (DST): UTC-5 (CDT)
- FIPS code: 05-90165
- GNIS ID: 69555

Bayou Township is a township in Baxter County, Arkansas, United States. Its total population was 360 as of the 2010 United States census, a decrease of 11.76 percent from 408 at the 2000 census.

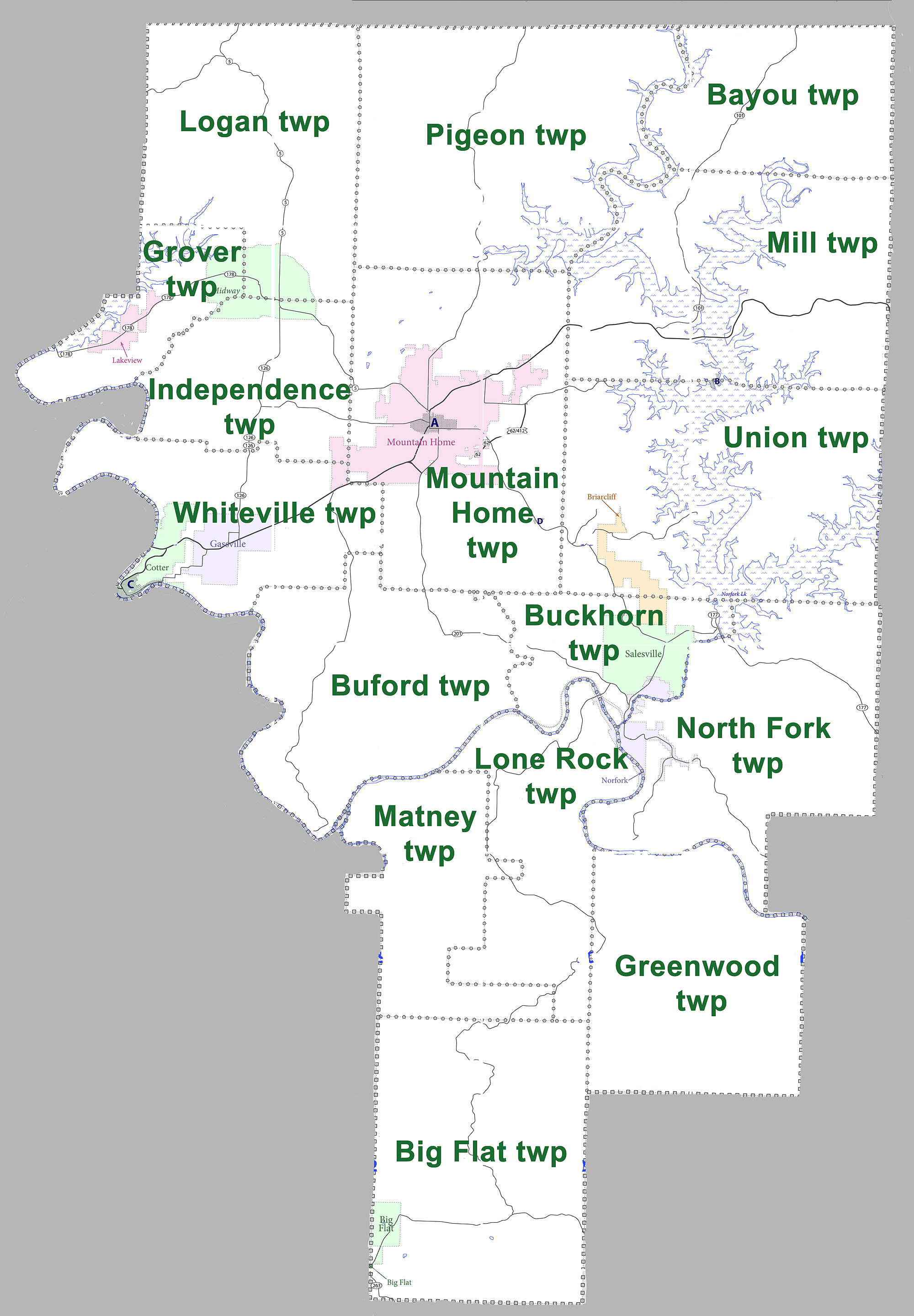
Townships in Baxter County as of 2010

According to the 2010 Census, Bayou Township is located at 36°28′04″N 92°12′34″W (36.467714, -92.209491). It has a total area of 26.945 square miles (69.79 square kilometers), of which 25.900 sq mi (67.08 km^{2}) is land and 1.045 sq mi (2.71 km^{2}) is water (3.88%). As per the USGS National Elevation Dataset, the elevation is 732 feet (223 m).
