= Gaston's Airport =

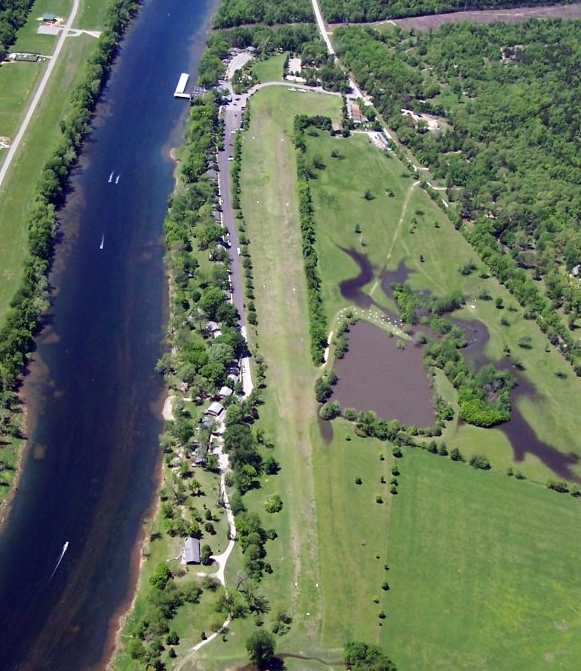
- IATA: none; ICAO: none; FAA LID: 3M0

Summary
- Airport type: Public use
- Owner: Gaston's White River Resort
- Serves: Lakeview, Arkansas
- Elevation AMSL: 479 ft (146 m)
- Coordinates: 36°20′57″N 092°33′21″W
- Website: https://www.gastons.com/airstrip/

Map
- Location of airport in Arkansas 3M0 (the United States)

Runways
| Direction | Length | | Surface |
| Direction | ft | m | Surface |
|---|---|---|---|
| 6/24 | 3,200 | 975 | Turf |

Statistics (2023)
- Aircraft operations: 10,700
- Source: Federal Aviation Administration

Gaston's Airport (FAA LID: 3M0) is a public use airport located one nautical mile (2 km) south of the central business district of Lakeview, a city in Baxter County, Arkansas, United States. It is privately owned by Gaston's White River Resort and is also known as Gaston's White River Resort Airstrip.

== Facilities and aircraft ==
Gaston's Airport covers an area of 16 acres (6 ha) at an elevation of 479 feet (146 m) above mean sea level. It has one runway designated 6/24 with a turf surface measuring 3,200 by 55 feet (975 x 17 m).

For the 12-month period ending October 31, 2023, the airport had 10,700 aircraft operations, an average of 29 per day: 98% general aviation and 2% military.

== See also ==
- List of airports in Arkansas
