= Ann, Missouri =

Ghost town in Douglas County, Missouri, United States

Coordinates: 37°01′51″N 92°11′51″W

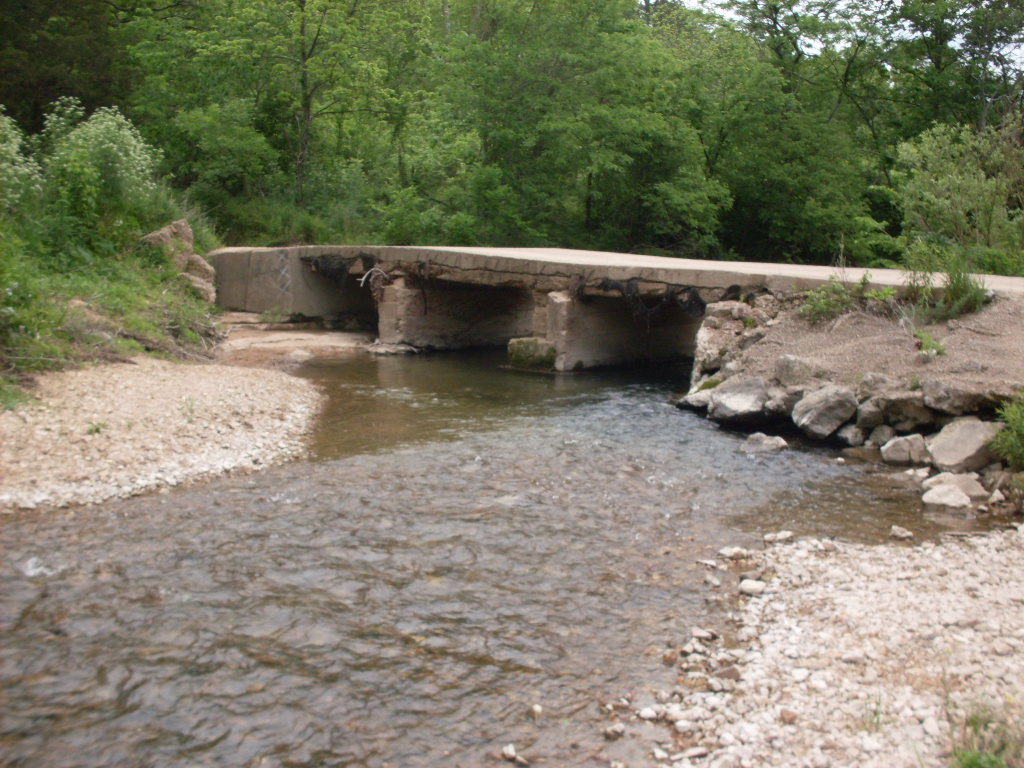
The North Fork River northeast of the community

Ann is a ghost town in Douglas County, Missouri, United States.

== Description ==
The GNIS classifies Ann as a populated place. The townsite is located at the junction of state routes EE and AD in the northeast corner of the county. The North Fork River runs along the east of the site.

A post office called Ann was established in 1898, and remained in operation until 1915. An early postmaster gave the community the name of his daughter.

== See also ==
- List of ghost towns in Missouri
