= Norfork Tailwater =

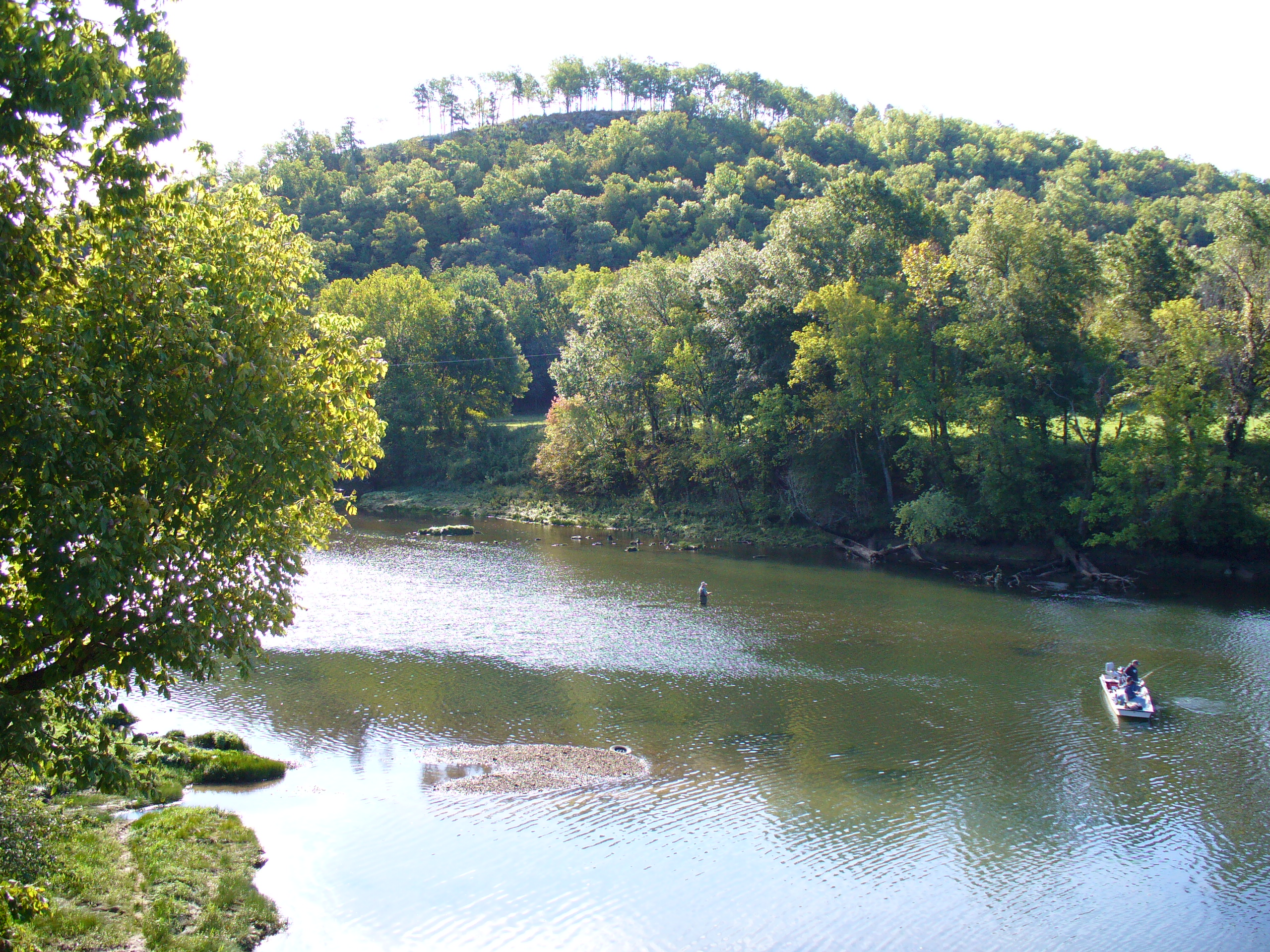
- Norfork Tailwater, September 2006

- Location within Arkansas
- Location: near Salesville, Arkansas
- Coordinates: 36.246239°N 92.245481°W
- Primary inflows: North Fork River, 100 to 6,000 cubic foot (2,800 to 169,900 L) per second from Norfork Dam
- Primary outflows: White River
- Managing agency: Arkansas Game and Fish Commission, U.S. Army Corps of Engineers
- Built: 1944

The Norfork Tailwater is the segment of the North Fork River below Norfork Dam in north central Arkansas. The Norfork Tailwater is about 4.8 miles (7.7 km) long and stretches from the dam below Lake Norfork to the White River at Norfork. The community of Salesville lies approximately 1.5 miles west of the dam on Arkansas Highway 177. Norfork is located on Arkansas Highway 5 at the confluence of the Norfork Tailwater with the White River approximately 3.5 miles southwest of the dam.

The Norfork Tailwater is home to brown, rainbow, cutthroat, and brook trout, as well as other fish. A trout hatchery (the Norfork National Fish Hatchery) near Quarry Park keeps the tailwater stocked with trout, while the dam's cold water output provides suitable habitat for these cool-water game fish.

== 2008 flood ==
In response to the Spring 2008 Midwest floods the Army Corps of Engineers opened the dam floodgates on April 10.
