= Bull Shoals Dam =

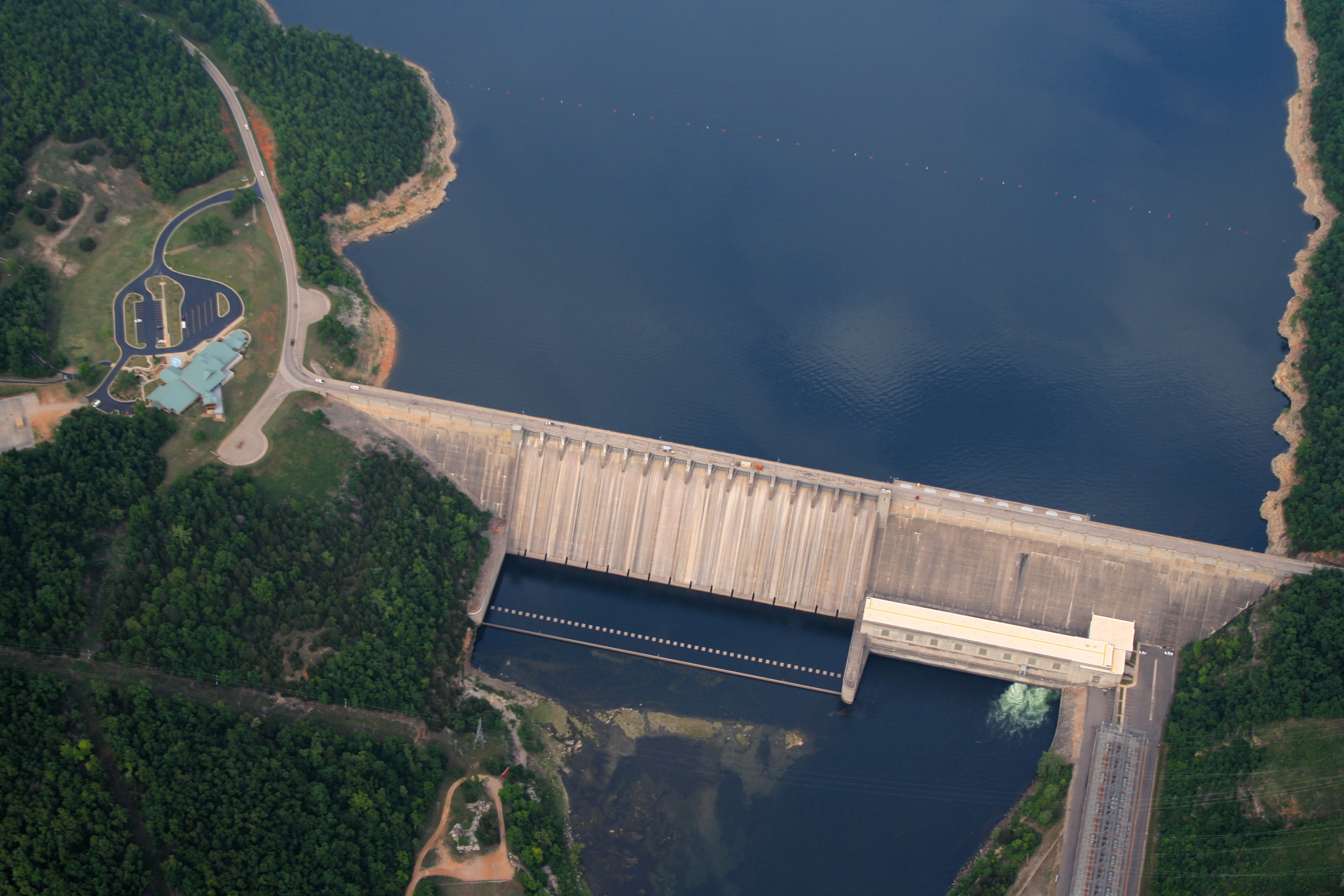
- Bull Shoals Dam from the air
- Interactive map of Bull Shoals Dam
- Country: United States
- Location: Baxter / Marion counties, Arkansas
- Coordinates: 36°21′58″N 92°34′29″W
- Construction began: 1947
- Opening date: 1951
- Owner: U.S. Army Corps of Engineers

Dam and spillways
- Type of dam: Concrete gravity
- Height: 256 feet (78 m)
- Length: 2,256 feet (688 m)
- Dam volume: 2,100,000 cubic yards (1,600,000 m^{3})
- Spillways: 17 gate-controlled bays
- Spillway capacity: 112,200 cubic feet per second (3,180 m^{3}/s)

Reservoir
- Creates: Bull Shoals Lake
- Total capacity: 5,760,000 acre-feet (7.10 km^{3})
- Active capacity: 3,400,000 acre-feet (4.2 km^{3})
- Catchment area: 6,036 square miles (15,630 km^{2})
- Surface area: 71,240 acres (28,830 ha)
- Maximum length: 87 miles (140 km)
- Normal elevation: 695 feet (212 m) (max)

Power Station
- Turbines: 4x 45-MW units, 4x 50-MW units
- Installed capacity: 380 MW
- Annual generation: 883,910,000 KWh

Bull Shoals Dam is a concrete gravity dam on the White River in northern Arkansas in the United States. The dam lies on the border of Marion and Baxter Counties, and forms Bull Shoals Lake, which extends well northwest into Missouri. Its main purposes are hydroelectricity production and flood control.

The dam was built by the U.S. Army Corps of Engineers in response to severe flooding between 1915 and 1927. President Franklin Delano Roosevelt authorized the construction of the dam as well as six others on the White River and its tributaries in the Flood Control Act of 1938. Construction started in June 1947 and the dam was completed in July 1951 at an estimated cost of $86 million (which translates to approximately $710 million in 2009 when adjusted for inflation). When finished, the dam was one of the largest concrete structures in the world. From its completion until 2009, it is estimated that the dam has prevented about $225.5 million in flood damages below the dam.
