= Cold Water School =

- U.S. National Register of Historic Places
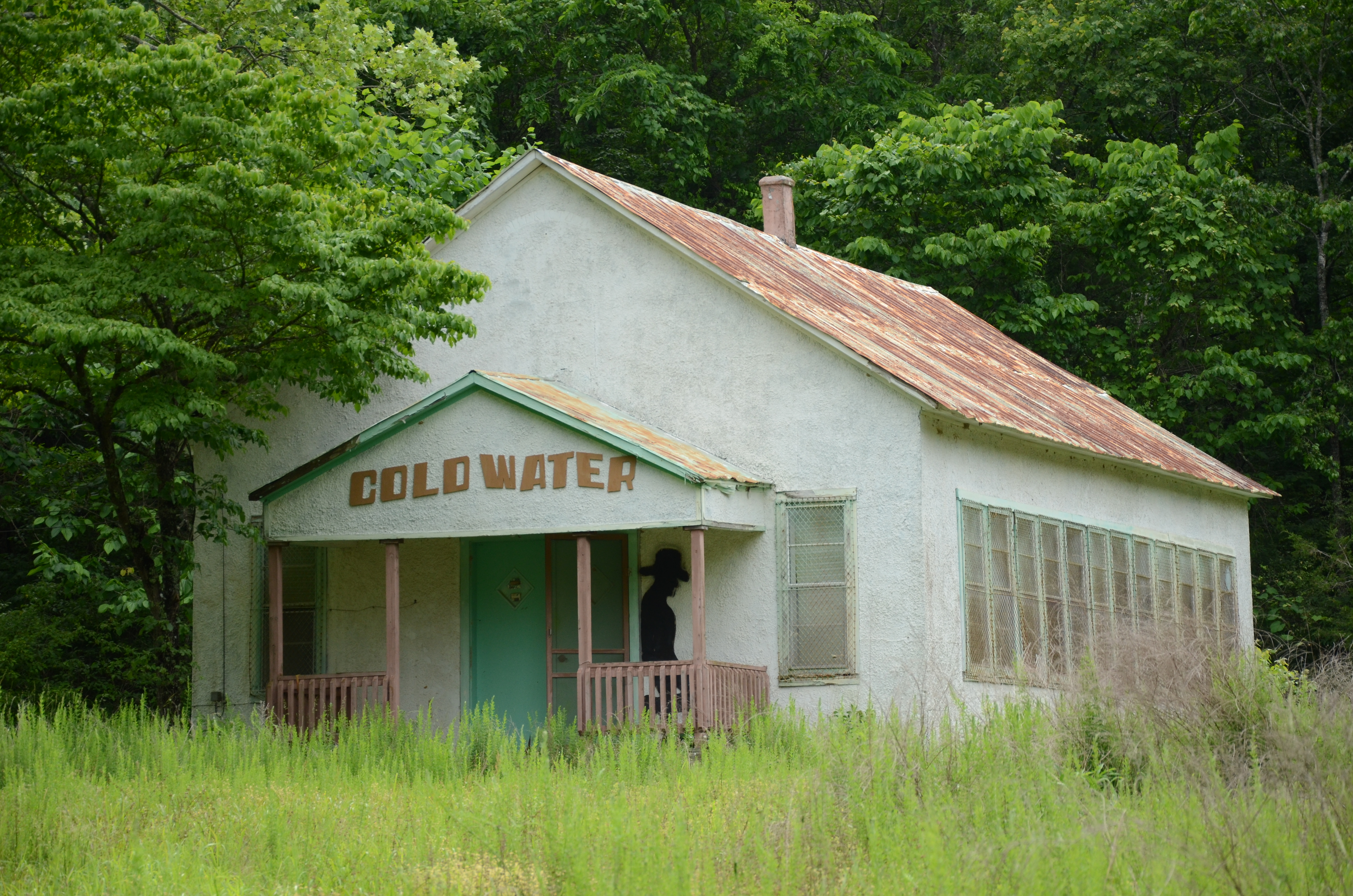

- Location within Arkansas Location within the United States
- Nearest city: Big Flat, Arkansas
- Coordinates: 36°8′32″N 92°15′58″W
- Area: 1.5 acres (0.61 ha)
- Built: 1926
- Architectural style: Plain Traditional
- NRHP reference No.: 08000485
- Added to NRHP: May 29, 2008

The Cold Water School is a historic school building at 2422 Baxter County Road 73, in the White River watershed northeast of Big Flat, Arkansas, on a privately owned inholding within Ozark National Forest. It was a "traditional one-room schoolhouse".

The building is a modest vernacular wood-frame structure with a gable roof and a fieldstone foundation finished with bubble mortar. The exterior of the building is finished in stucco, and its interior walls are plaster. A gabled porch extends from the main facade. The school was built in 1926, replacing an earlier similar building which was destroyed by fire, and was used as a school until 1960, when the district schools were consolidated.

The building was listed on the National Register of Historic Places in 1926.

== See also ==
- National Register of Historic Places listings in Baxter County, Arkansas
