= Cartney, Arkansas =

- Unincorporated community
- Cartney's position in Arkansas Cartney, Arkansas (the United States)
- Coordinates: 36°11′40″N 92°22′57″W
- Country: United States
- State: Arkansas
- County: Baxter
- Elevation: 417 ft (127 m)
- Time zone: UTC-6 (Central (CST))
  - Summer (DST): UTC-5 (CDT)
- GNIS feature ID: 71023

Cartney is an unincorporated community in Baxter County, Arkansas, United States. The community is located along the White River and the Missouri and Northern Arkansas Railroad.

The rural crossroads was initially known as Hayney, named after an early postmaster. Early commerce centered around harvesting cedar trees and floating them downriver, and later a large early rubber tire company. Cartney later became home to a commercial marble mine and supporting community. Pink and gray marble from Cartney was used in the Missouri State Capitol and the United States Capitol.
