= Salesville, Arkansas =

- City
- Location of Salesville in Baxter County, Arkansas.
- Coordinates: 36°14′41″N 92°16′32″W
- Country: United States
- State: Arkansas
- County: Baxter
- Named for: John Sales, first settler

Area
  - Total: 4.52 sq mi (11.70 km^{2})
  - Land: 4.51 sq mi (11.69 km^{2})
  - Water: 0 sq mi (0.00 km^{2})
- Elevation: 656 ft (200 m)

Population (2020)
  - Total: 473
  - Estimate (2025): 524 ▲
  - Density: 104.8/sq mi (40.45/km^{2})
- Time zone: UTC-6 (Central (CST))
  - Summer (DST): UTC-5 (CDT)
- ZIP code: 72653
- Area code: 870
- FIPS code: 05-62240
- GNIS feature ID: 2405406

Salesville is a city in Baxter County, Arkansas, United States. As of the 2020 census, Salesville had a population of 473.

== Geography ==
Salesville is located in central Baxter County at 36°14′41″N 92°16′32″W (36.244845, -92.275619). The center of town is at the intersection of Arkansas Highway 5 and 177, 1.5 miles (2.4 km) west of Norfork Dam. The North Fork River, after coming out of the dam, forms the eastern boundary of Salesville. Arkansas Highway 5 leads northwest 10 miles (16 km) to Mountain Home, the county seat, and south 3 miles (5 km) to the city of Norfork and 38 miles (61 km) to Mountain View.

According to the United States Census Bureau, the city has a total area of 4.5 square miles (11.6 km^{2}), all land.

=== List of highways ===
- Arkansas Highway 5
- Arkansas Highway 177

== Education ==
Salesville is in the Norfork School District with students graduating from Norfork High School.

== Demographics ==
Historical population
Census	Pop.	Note	%±
1970	156		—
1980	406		160.3%
1990	374		−7.9%
2000	437		16.8%
2010	450		3.0%
2020	473		5.1%
2025 (est.)	524	▲	10.8%
U.S. Decennial Census

As of the census of 2000, there were 437 people, 206 households, and 131 families residing in the city. The population density was 97.7 inhabitants per square mile (37.7/km^{2}). There were 267 housing units at an average density of 59.7 per square mile (23.1/km^{2}). The racial makeup of the city was 95.42% White, 1.37% Native American, 0.23% Asian, 0.69% from other races, and 2.29% from two or more races. 1.60% of the population were Hispanic or Latino of any race.

There were 206 households, out of which 20.9% had children under the age of 18 living with them, 56.3% were married couples living together, 5.8% had a female householder with no husband present, and 36.4% were non-families. 33.5% of all households were made up of individuals, and 17.0% had someone living alone who was 65 years of age or older. The average household size was 2.12 and the average family size was 2.72.

In the city, the population was spread out, with 17.8% under the age of 18, 4.3% from 18 to 24, 23.6% from 25 to 44, 31.1% from 45 to 64, and 23.1% who were 65 years of age or older. The median age was 48 years. For every 100 females, there were 94.2 males. For every 100 females age 18 and over, there were 87.0 males.

The median income for a household in the city was $23,542, and the median income for a family was $33,611. Males had a median income of $29,531 versus $17,250 for females. The per capita income for the city was $17,077. About 9.8% of families and 12.9% of the population were below the poverty line, including 13.3% of those under age 18 and 13.8% of those age 65 or over.
