= Norfork Dam =

Dam in Arkansas, U.S.

Norfork Lake
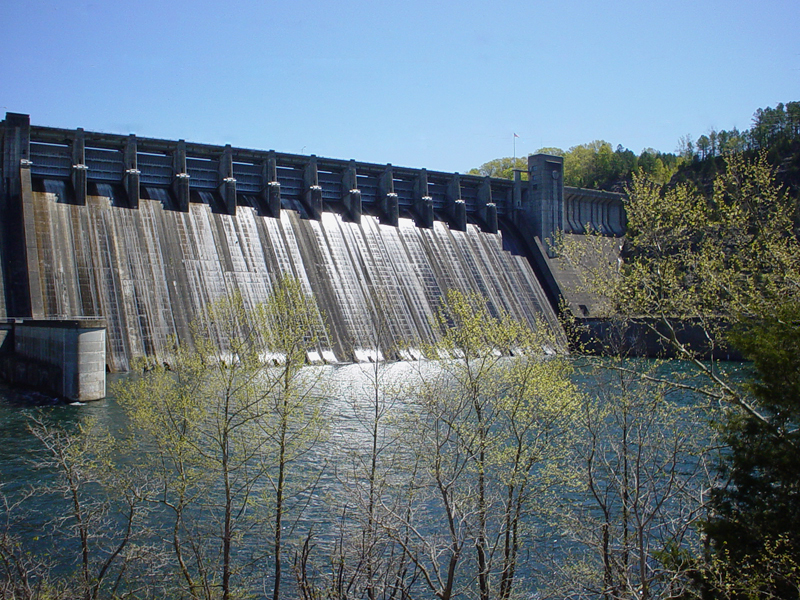
- Norfork Dam

- Location within Arkansas Location within Missouri Location within the United States
- Country: United States
- Location: Salesville, Arkansas
- Coordinates: 36°20′42″N 92°14′06″W
- Purpose: Flood control, hydroelectric power generation
- Status: Operational
- Construction began: 1941
- Opening date: 1944
- Owner: United States of America
- Operator: United States Army Corps of Engineers

Dam and spillways
- Type of dam: Concrete gravity
- Impounds: North Fork River

Reservoir
- Creates: Lake Norfork
- Active capacity: 732,000 acre-feet (903,000,000 m^{3})
- Inactive capacity: 2,000,000 acre-feet (2.5×10^{9} m^{3})
- Catchment area: 1,806 sq mi (4,680 km^{2})
- Surface area: 30,700 acres (12,400 ha)
- Maximum length: 550 mi (890 km)
- Maximum water depth: 178 ft (54 m) (at normal pool)
- Normal elevation: 548 ft (167 m)

Norfork Dam impounds the North Fork River in the U.S. state of Arkansas, creating Norfork Lake. The large reservoir is maintained by the United States Army Corps of Engineers and spans Baxter County, Arkansas, Fulton County, Arkansas and Ozark County, Missouri. The dam is located in the city of Salesville in Baxter County, within the Ozark Mountains.

Arkansas Highway 177 (AR 177) crosses the lake atop the dam.

There are 19 recreational parks on the lake that provide places for camping, hiking, picnicking, swimming, boating, and water skiing. Commercial docks on Norfork Lake provide boats, motors, diving equipment, and guides to the lake.

== History ==
=== Beginnings ===
In 1902, a pamphlet was printed by the Mountain Home Commercial club advertising the area to mining interests and suggesting the area would be suitable for power-generating dams. Several entities, including Dixie Power Company and White River Power Company, were granted franchises and explored dam sites on various rivers in North Arkansas, including the White River. Flood control became an urgent need following the 1927 flood, but by the time a study was completed and presented to Congress, the country was in the throes of the Great Depression, and funding was scarce.

But in 1938, the Federal Power Commission rescinded private licenses to construct dams while the government studied flood control in the White River basin. A proposal for what would become Norfork Dam would inundate US Route 62 (US 62) during periods of high water, with the Corps offering a ferry service during these periods.

Clyde T. Ellis, who defeated Claude Fuller in 1938 to become the representative for the Arkansas's 3rd congressional district, envisioned a smaller Arkansas version of the Tennessee Valley Authority. Ellis made Norfork Dam his personal project and fought for it until construction began in the spring of 1941. Having won the election with the promise of cheap hydroelectricity, he hoped the dams would give rise to industry and lift the region out of the depths of depression. Ellis firmly believed that if Norfork Dam was built then the other dams would follow. Authorization for construction of the dam was included as part of the Flood Control Act of 1938. Norfork Dam was to be one of six dams built to accomplish flood control in the White River basin. The act was later revised in 1941 to include Bull Shoals and Table Rock.

=== Power generation ===
Power generation was not originally included in the project purpose for Norfork Dam. However, this was unacceptable to the people of Baxter County and the surrounding region. The sparse population of the area did not justify investment, by private companies, in a large network of power lines. It was believed that, if the dam did not include power generation, it could be many years before the region would gain service. While most citizens would have accepted any type of government project to help boost the economy, a large delegation from the region met in Harrison, Arkansas to insist that power generation be included in the project purpose. The Baxter County delegation wanted to pass a resolution that would have expressed opposition to any dam that did not include hydroelectric power facilities. They feared that the cost/benefit ratio would not justify congressional expenditure unless power generation was included, and the dam would never be built. However, the Batesville, Arkansas delegation was able to convince the assembly that the resolution may be interpreted as general opposition to the dam and it never passed. They believed that the population and economic growth brought by the construction of the dam would make it feasible for power companies to move in. As it happened the citizens of Baxter County need not have worried. Shortly after construction began Congress, under the threat of impending war, authorized construction of the power house and two out of the four generators for Norfork Dam.

=== Construction ===
Built on the North Fork River, Norfork Dam was one of the six largest concrete dams in the country at the time of its construction. All preliminary investigation, the final design of the structure, and the preparation of construction plans and specs was carried out under the supervision of Lieutenant Colonel Stanley L. Scott. Much work had to be done before construction could begin on the massive structure. First, a suitable location had to be found before any other type of work could begin. Because of the large number of caves in the region foundation exploration, using diamond tipped drills, was carried out for nearly a year before plans were completed. Once a site was selected, a nearby source of sufficient materials for construction had to be located. Since the site was acceptable for either an earth or concrete dam, the types of construction materials and their locations would be the deciding factor in determining what type of dam would be built. The decision to build a concrete dam was made because sufficient quantities of concrete aggregate could be located near the construction site, while there was insufficient material for an earth dam. The detailed design of the dam, construction plans and specifications were prepared by the design section of the engineering division under Mr. G.R. Schneider.

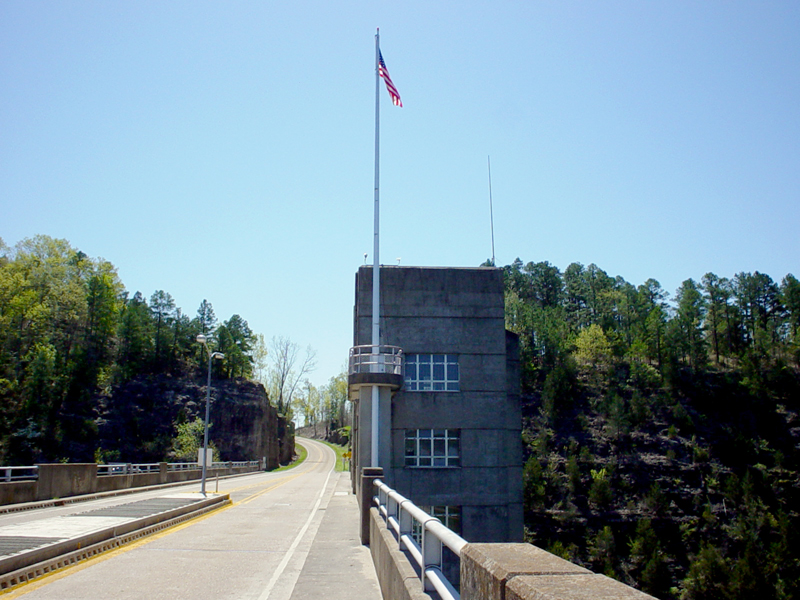
Norfork Dam

The construction contracts for the dam were awarded to the Morrison-Knudsen company and the Utah Construction Company. Both companies had participated in the construction of the Grand Coulee Dam and Hoover Dam. Construction began in the spring of 1941 with the removal of 400,000 cubic yards (310,000 m^{3}) of earth to expose the bedrock foundation and an additional 28,000 cubic yards (21,000 m^{3}) had to be removed to stabilize it. This was accomplished using draglines and power shovels. Most of the smaller aggregate used in construction was removed from the sand and gravel bars of a twenty-mile (32 km) section of the White River. A quarry and crushing plant was required to create nearly 800,000 tons of larger aggregate. Between thirty-five hundred and four thousand people came to witness the first blast to be made on Norfork Dam. Touted by advertisers as the biggest blast in the world; many of the spectators were sorely disappointed when the blast finally occurred. They had been made to believe that the entire cliff was going to be blown away. After the event, construction officials said no one had ever intended to do this and apologized for the disappointment (Blevins; Scott).

Norfork Dam is a gravity dam; this means that it resists the thrust of water entirely by its own weight. This takes enormous amounts of concrete which can be expensive; however, many engineers prefer the solid strength of gravity dams to arch dams or buttress dams. For example, Norfork Dam and the powerhouse cost approximately 28,600,000 dollars; a very large sum of money in the early 1940s. It was constructed in sections, called monoliths, ranging from forty to fifty-four feet in length and not exceeding five feet in height (Scott).

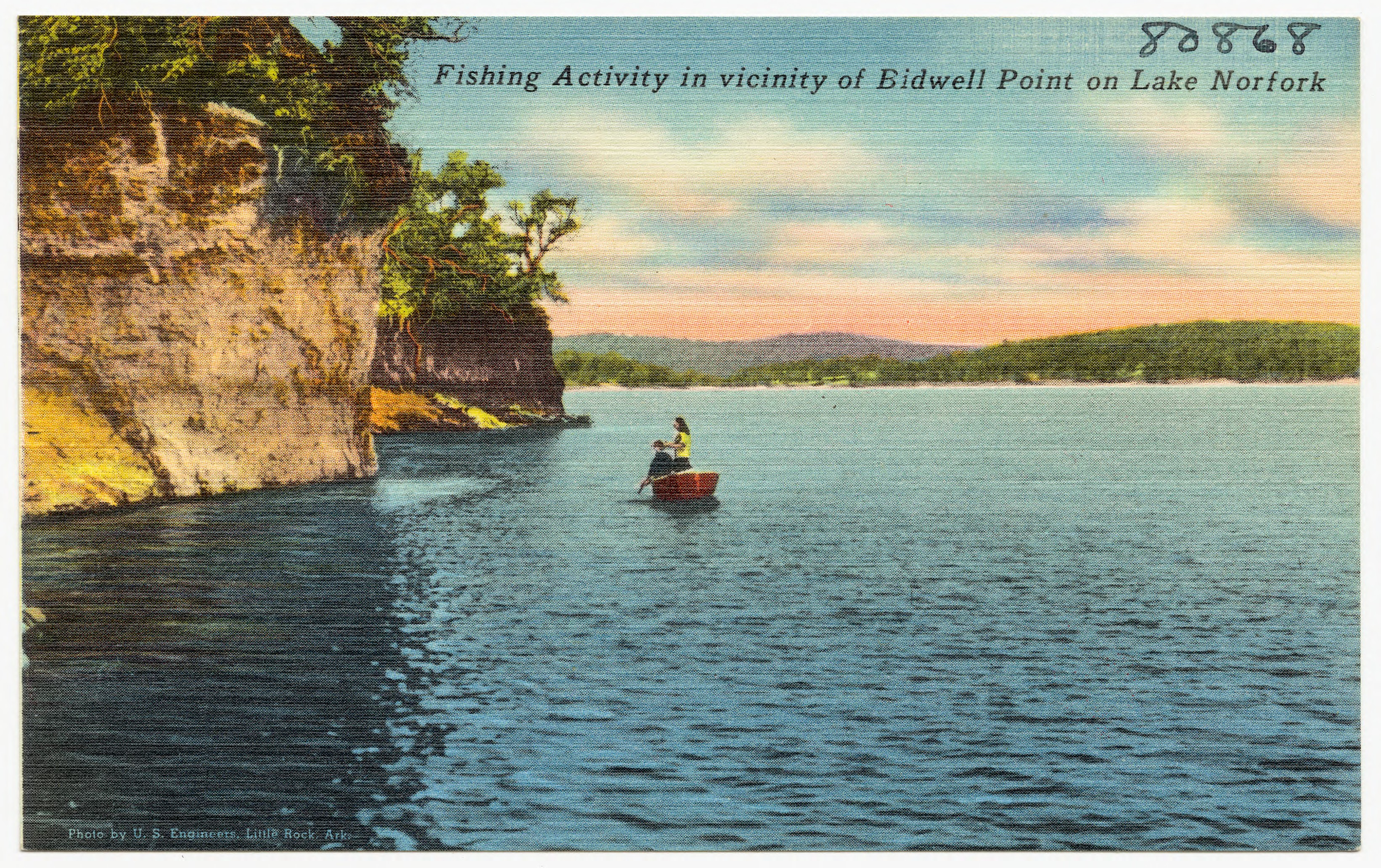
Fishing activity in vicinity of Bidwell Point on Lake Norfolk

The completion of the dam had an immediate effect; with freedom from the fear of floods many people began to reoccupy farms downstream of the dam. Ironically the areas most affected by seasonal flooding were those covered by the reservoir, and the dam had little effect on flooding of the White River. However, not everyone was happy with the construction of the dam, nearly four-hundred people had to be removed from one of the most heavily populated and prosperous regions of Baxter County to make room for the reservoir. The government only paid people for their land if they had structures on it, effectively stealing thousands of acres from rightful landowners. As a result, many people did not get paid for their land when it was covered. One Widowed woman was given only $1500 in exchange for 666 acres in the present day Cranfield Area of the lake. This was awarded after a nearly 10 year long legal battle. One man who thought he had lake front property paid taxes on it until 2004 when he realized that his property was underwater (Andrewson).

The record level of 581.84 feet (177.34 m) occurred in 2008, according to the U.S. Corps Of Engineers. Flood pool is 580 feet (176.8 m).

== Effect of Norfork Dam on Baxter County ==
In the late 1930s, before construction of the Norfork Dam had begun, the local economy of Baxter County, Arkansas was deteriorating. The yearly per capita income had fallen to between one-hundred and two-hundred dollars, and in 1940 alone more than six hundred small farms were abandoned. Those who remained looked forward with enthusiasm to any solution that promised relief from their economic problems. Mountain Home, Arkansas, then the largest community, was described as having no prospect for new business and very few paved roads. When construction of the dam finally began in the spring of 1941 it was said that, "before the first shovel of dirt was thrown, or the first tree dozed down, the Mountain Home people knew that a new era had dawned". As the largest nearby community, Mountain Home was to derive the most spectacular benefit for the Corps projects in the area. Centrally located between both Norfork and Bull Shoals Dam, few of its citizens could foresee the economic change Norfork Dam would bring to the poor agricultural community.

When the dam was initially designed for flood control only, the existing US 62 bridge would be subject to infrequent inundation. The Corps agreed to provide ferry service during these periods. But when the design changed in 1941 to include power generation, the dam was raised and the bridge would be permanently submerged. In 1942, the Corps, United States Bureau of Public Roads, and Arkansas State Highway Commission agreed bridge piers would be installed prior to inundation to allow for a new bridge to be constructed, with the Arkansas Highway Department operating a ferry until the bridge could be completed. In 1943, the Corps began accelerating the project, informed the Highway Department there would not be time for the bridge pier construction, and that condemnation proceedings would begin immediately. Ultimately the Highway Department agreed to receive $800,000 ($14,885,000 today) from the Corps in exchange for operating a ferry in perpetuity. This ferry ultimately became woefully inadequate for the traffic in the area, especially during the summer tourism season in the Ozarks. It would take legislation in the 1970s before a bridge replaced the ferry in 1983.

== Norfork Lake ==
Norfork Lake covers 22,000 acres (8,900 ha) with more than 550 miles (890 km) of shoreline. Most of the lake lies within Baxter County, Arkansas, with its Northernmost portion in Ozark County, Missouri.

Bass, crappie, walleye, catfish, and bream are all found on the lake with almost all other varieties of fresh water game fish. Below the dam, North Fork River has a superb population of trout. The Norfork National Fish Hatchery maintains a continuous supply of trout.

== See also ==
- List of Arkansas dams and reservoirs
