= North Fork River (Missouri–Arkansas) =

Stream in the American states of Missouri and Arkansas

North Fork river
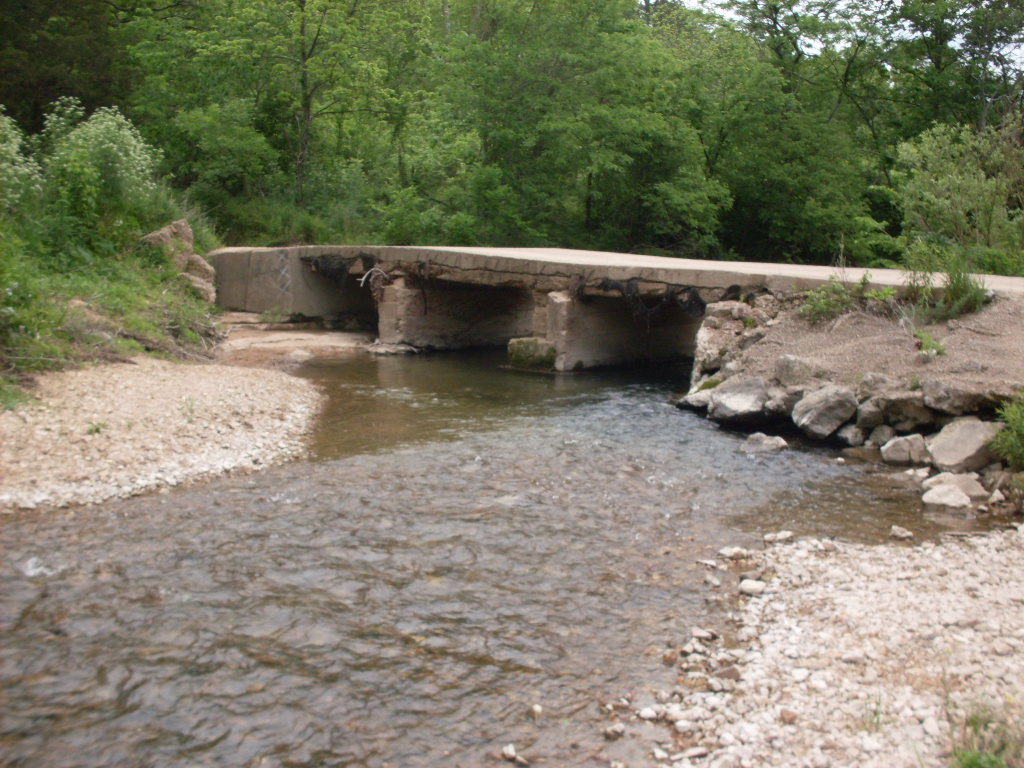
- Bridge over the upper North Fork River in northeast Douglas County, Missouri near the community of Ann

Location
- Country: United States
- States: Arkansas and Missouri

Physical characteristics
- Source
  - location: Southwest Texas County, Missouri
  - coordinates: 37°07′11″N 92°14′54″W
  - elevation: Approximately 1454 ft
- Mouth
  - location: White River
  - coordinates: 36°12′38″N 92°17′25″W
  - elevation: 351 ft
- Length: 175 km (109 mi)
- Discharge
  - location: Tecumseh
  - average: 1,194 cu ft/s (33.8 m^{3}/s)

The North Fork River or the North Fork of White River is a 109-mile-long (175 km) tributary of the White River, into which it flows near Norfork, Arkansas.

It rises in the southwest corner of Texas County, at the southeast margin the city of Mountain Grove, and flows generally southwards through the southwest corner of Texas, eastern Douglas and Ozark counties. It flows through Mark Twain National Forest and gathers the waters of many streams, including its major tributary, Bryant Creek. The watershed includes major portions of eastern Douglas and Ozark counties and includes portions of Webster, Wright, Texas and Howell counties in Missouri.

South of Tecumseh, Missouri, the river becomes Norfork Lake, a reservoir created by Norfork Dam in Baxter County, Arkansas. A few miles below the dam, the North Fork River joins the White River near the town of Norfork, Arkansas. The part of the river below the Norfork Dam is called the Norfork Tailwater and is a trout fishing stream.
