= Arkansas Highway 178 =

State highway in Arkansas, United States

Highway 178

Route information
- Maintained by ArDOT
- Existed: 1953–present

Section 1
- Length: 24.38 mi (39.24 km)
- West end: US 62 / US 412 near Flippin
- East end: US 62B in Mountain Home

Section 2
- Length: 4.29 mi (6.90 km)
- West end: US 62B in Mountain Home
- East end: Norfork Lake

Location
- Country: United States
- State: Arkansas
- Counties: Marion, Baxter

Highway system
- Arkansas Highway System; Interstate; US; State; Business; Spurs; Suffixed; Scenic; Heritage
← AR 177	→ AR 179

Highway 178 (AR 178, Ark. 178, and Hwy. 178) is a designation for two east–west state highways in the Ozark Mountains. One segment begins near Flippin and runs east across Bull Shoals Dam to downtown Mountain Home. A second segment begins in eastern Mountain Home and runs east to Lake Norfork. Both highways are maintained by the Arkansas Department of Transportation (ArDOT).

== Route description ==
=== Flippin to Mountain Home ===
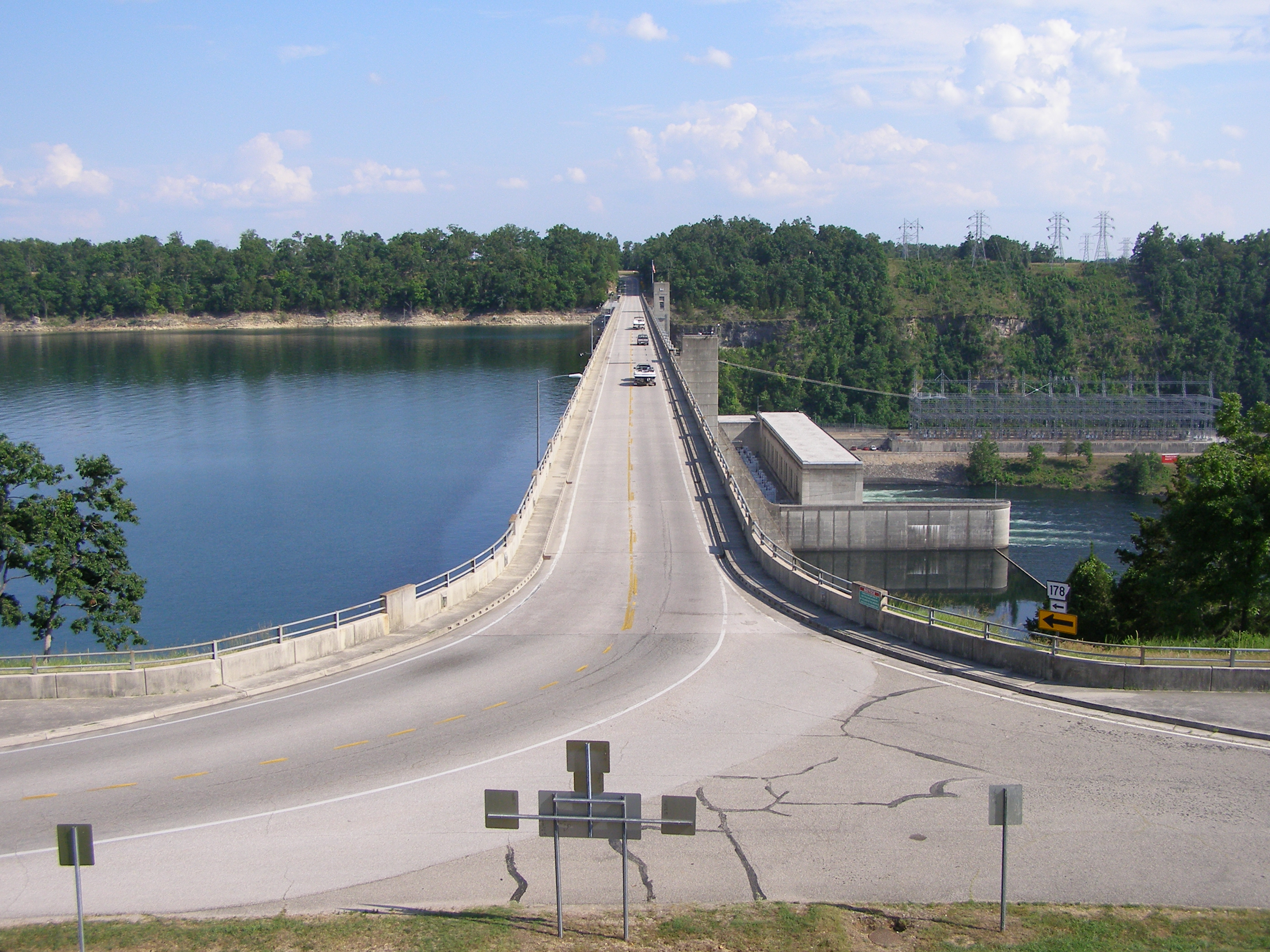
Highway 178 over Bull Shoals Dam, as seen from the Bull Shoals-White River State Park Visitor Center

Highway 178 begins at US 62/US 412 south of Flippin in the Ozark Mountains. It runs north into Flippin, becoming a two-lane road with a center turn lane, passing Hickey City Park, and bridging Fallen Ash Creek. It runs along the western edge of downtown Flippin before bridging the Missouri and Northern Arkansas Railroad tracks. In the northern part of Flippin, Highway 178 serves as the eastern terminus of Highway 202 before crossing Crane Creek. Highway 178 serves as the western terminus of Highway 980, which runs east to the Marion County Regional Airport. North of the city, Highway 178 winds north through forested Ozarks hills, passing homes and approaching the White River. It passes through the unincorporated community of Fairview before entering the small lakeside town of Bull Shoals along the shores of Bull Shoals Lake. Highway 178 enters Bull Shoals-White River State Park, passing over Bull Shoals Dam and entering Baxter County.

East of the state park, Highway 178 passes the regionally known Gaston's White River Resort, followed by the small town of Lakeview. The highway passes the Lakeview Use Area on Bull Shoals Lake, managed by the U.S. Army Corps of Engineers (USACE, or "the Corps").

Mid-century residential subdivisions, largely oriented toward the nearby lake, are the dominant land use until Highway 178 intersects Highway 5 in a more rural area, forming a brief concurrency southbound. Highway 178 turns from the concurrency with Highway 5, forming a southbound concurrency with Highway 126. The two highways pass Baxter County Airport before Highway 178 turns from Highway 126 toward Mountain Home. Highway 178 enters the western side of Mountain Home, entering the Mountain Home Commercial Historic District at an intersection with Hickory Street, passing The Baxter Bulletin office. Highway 178 intersects US 62B (Main Street, as well as unsigned Highway 5 and Highway 201) near the Baxter County Courthouse; the route's eastern terminus.

=== Mountain Home to Norfork Lake ===
Highway 178 begins at US 62B in eastern Mountain Home, a commercial thoroughfare. It runs due south as Club Boulevard before turning east onto Buzzard Roost Road. The road crosses US 62/US 412 (Shield Hopper Bypass) just east of the city limits and winds east through a wooded area approaching Lake Norfork. The highway terminates at the Buzzard Roost Use area on the lake, managed by the Corps.

== History ==
The roadway between Flippin and Midway was shown as early as 1948, while the Bull Shoals Dam was under construction. The dam was completed in July 1951, with a highway atop the dam to allow highway access for the parts of northeastern Marion County separated from the county seat of Yellville by the new reservoir. Though Highway 178 doesn't appear on the March 1953 state highway map, a later 1953 map shows the Highway 178 designation.

Following the completion of the dam, President of the United States Harry Truman visited the dam in July 1952, and gave a speech at the dam site. Following the ribbon cutting, Truman and the presidential motorcade traveled along Highway 178 to Flippin en route to Cotter.

The highway was extended east from Highway 126 to Mountain Home on April 24, 1963. The second segment was created on June 28, 1973, between Mountain Home and the Buzzard Roost Use Area pursuant to Act 9 of 1973 by the Arkansas General Assembly. The act directed county judges and legislators to designate up to 12 miles (19 km) of county roads as state highways in each county. On February 27, 1974, Highway 178 was redirected onto Club Boulevard, with the segments along College Street and East 4th removed from the state highway system in exchange for an extension of Highway 341 at the request of the Baxter County Judge.

The highway remained unchanged since 1974 until an extension through Flippin following construction of a new terrain route of US 62 bypassing the town. East of downtown Flippin, the former US 62 became Highway 178.

== Major intersections ==
Mile markers reset at concurrencies.

County	Location	mi	km	Destinations	Notes
Marion		0.00	0.00	US 62 / US 412 – Mountain Home, Harrison	Western terminus
Marion	Flippin	1.83	2.95	AR 202 west (Fallen Ash Road) – Summit	AR 202 eastern terminus
Marion		1.96	3.15	AR 980 east – Marion County Regional Airport	AR 980 western terminus
Marion–Baxter county line	Bull Shoals	11.91	19.17	Bull Shoals Dam	
Baxter	Midway	19.37	31.17	AR 5 north – Gainesville, MO	Begin AR 5 overlap
Baxter	Midway	0.00	0.00	AR 5 south – Mountain Home AR 126 west	End AR 5 overlap, begin AR 126 overlap, AR 126 eastern terminus
Baxter		0.00	0.00	AR 126 west – Gassville	End AR 126 overlap
Baxter	Mountain Home	5.01	8.06	US 62B west (Main Street) to AR 5 / AR 201	Eastern terminus
Baxter	Mountain Home	Gap in route			
Baxter	Mountain Home	0.00	0.00	US 62B east	Western terminus
Baxter		1.92	3.09	US 62 / US 412 (Shield Hopper Bypass)	
Baxter		4.29	6.90	Lake Norfork	Eastern terminus
1.000 mi = 1.609 km; 1.000 km = 0.621 mi: Concurrency terminus

== See also ==
- List of state highways in Arkansas
