= Arkansas Highway 126 =

Highway in Arkansas

Highway 126

Route information
- Maintained by ArDOT
- Existed: c. 1928–present

Section 1
- Length: 11.660 mi (18.765 km)
- South end: Buffalo City
- North end: US 62 / US 412 near Mountain Home

Section 2
- Length: 7.025 mi (11.306 km)
- South end: US 62 / US 412 in Gassville
- North end: AR 5 / AR 178 at Midway

Location
- Country: United States
- State: Arkansas
- Counties: Baxter

Highway system
- Arkansas Highway System; Interstate; US; State; Business; Spurs; Suffixed; Scenic; Heritage
← AR 125	→ AR 127

Highway 126 (AR 126, Ark. 126, and Hwy. 126) is a designation for two north–south state highways in Baxter County, Arkansas. A southern route of 11.66 miles (18.76 km) runs from Buffalo City north to US Route 62/US Route 412 (US 62/US 412) near Mountain Home. A second route of 7.03 miles (11.31 km) begins at US 62/US 412 in Gassville and runs north to Highway 5/Highway 178 at Midway.

== Route description ==
=== Buffalo City to Mountain Home ===
Highway 126 begins near the Marion County line at Buffalo City, situated at the confluence of the Buffalo River and White River. It heads north to Buford and before it meets US 62/US 412, where it terminates near Mountain Home. The average daily traffic counts from the Arkansas State Highway and Transportation Department (AHTD) for 2010 show that a maximum of about 1500 vehicles per day (VPD) use the northern portion of Highway 126 nearest US 62/US 412, with the count dropping to around 660 VPD for portions further south.

The highway passes the Buford School Building, listed on the National Register of Historic Places.

=== Gassville to Midway ===
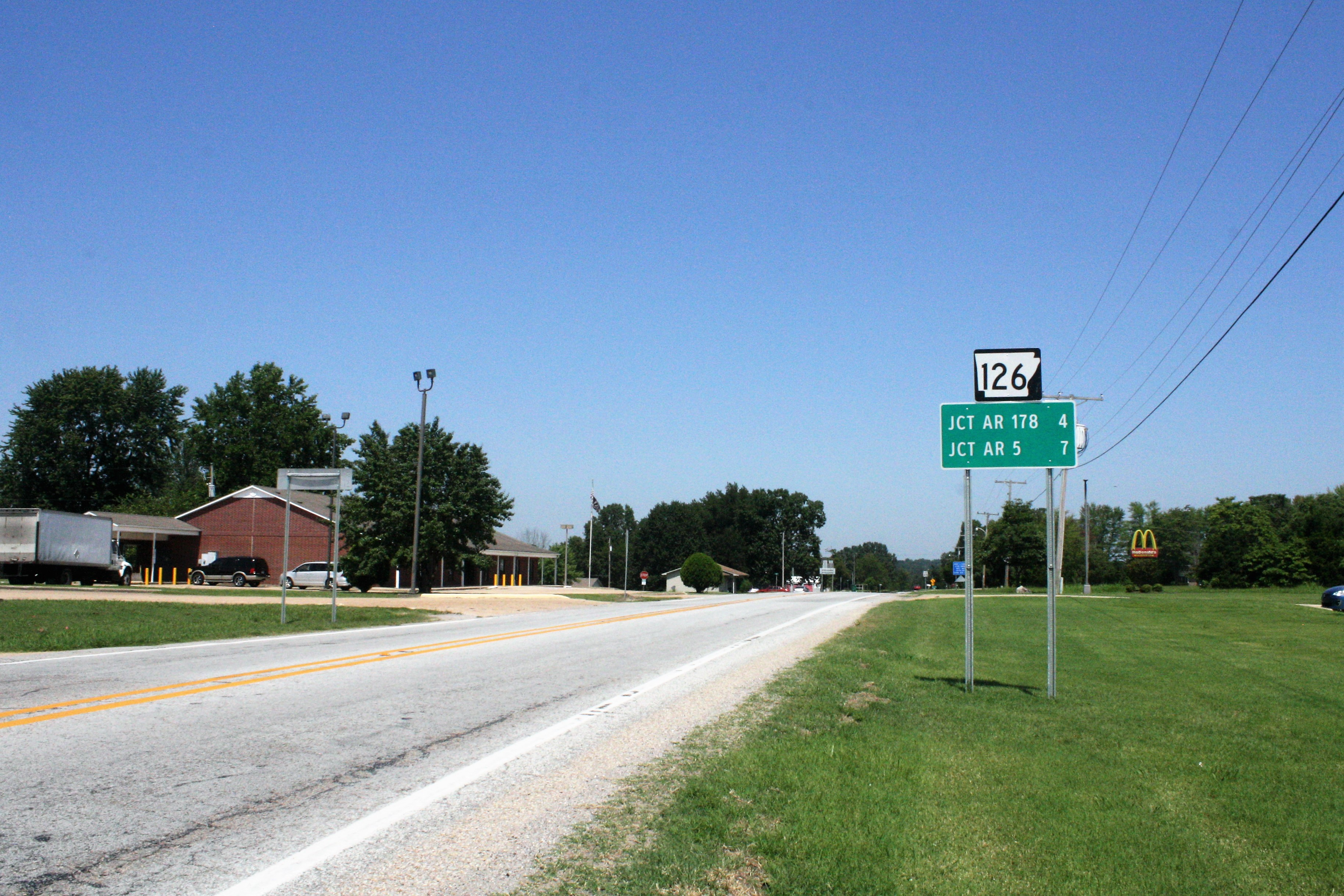
First reassurance marker for AR 126 north of the US 62/US 412 junction

Highway 126 begins at US 62/US 412 (Main Street) in Gassville. It runs north past an intersection with Vine Street (former AR 345). The route exits Gassville to the north, passing through Whiteville and forming a concurrency with Highway 178 near Monkey Run. This overlap continues north past Ozark Regional Airport to Midway, where the route terminates. Highway 178 follows Highway 5 briefly north before turning west toward Bull Shoals-White River State Park.

Traffic counts from the AHTD in 2010 indicate that the average daily traffic volume on this segment of Highway 126 ranges from 3800 VPD near Gassville to 2800 VPD at the northern terminus.

== History ==
AR 126 first appeared on the May 1, 1928 state highway map between AR 101 near Flippin and Midway, with an overlap of Highway 12. In 1931, US 62 replaced Highway 12 in the area, truncating Highway 126 at Gassville.

The Arkansas State Highway Commission created a second segment of Highway 126 on July 29, 1970, between US 62 and Buford to serve recreational traffic near the White River. The highway was extended south to the White River at Buffalo City on May 29, 1975.

== Major intersections ==
The entire route is in Baxter County.

Location	mi	km	Destinations	Notes
Buffalo City	0.000	0.000	Buffalo Way	Southern terminus
	11.660	18.765	US 62 east / US 412 east – Mountain Home	Northern terminus
Gap in route
Gassville	0.000	0.000	US 62 west / US 412 west (Main Street) – Harrison	Southern terminus
Gassville	0.19	0.31	Vine Street	Former AR 345
	3.94	6.34	AR 178 east – Mountain Home	
	6.13	9.87	AR 980 west – Ozark Regional Airport	AR 980 eastern terminus
Midway	7.025	11.306	AR 5 / AR 178 east – Mountain Home, Lakeview, Bull Shoals	Northern terminus
1.000 mi = 1.609 km; 1.000 km = 0.621 mi
