= U.S. Route 62 in Arkansas =

Segment of American highway

U.S. Highway 62
- US 62 highlighted in red

Route information
- Maintained by AHTD
- Length: 329.9 mi (530.9 km)
- Existed: 1930–present

Major junctions
- West end: US 62 at the Oklahoma state line near Summers
- I-49 / US 71 / AR 180 in Fayetteville; US 412 in Springdale; I-49 / US 71 / AR 102 in Rogers; US 412 in Alpena; US 65 in Harrison; US 167 in Ash Flat; US 63 in Hardy; US 63 / US 412 in Imboden; US 67 from Pocahontas to Corning; US 49 in Piggott
- East end: US 62 at the Missouri state line in St. Francis

Location
- Country: United States
- State: Arkansas
- Counties: Washington, Benton, Carroll, Boone, Marion, Baxter, Fulton, Sharp, Lawrence, Randolph, Clay

Highway system
- United States Numbered Highway System; List; Special; Divided; Arkansas Highway System; Interstate; US; State; Business; Spurs; Suffixed; Scenic; Heritage
← US 61	→ US 63

U.S. Route 62 (US 62) is a U.S. highway running from El Paso, Texas northeast to Niagara Falls, New York. In the U.S. state of Arkansas, the route runs 329.9 miles from the Oklahoma border near Summers east to the Missouri border in St. Francis, serving the northern portion of the state. The route passes through several cities and towns, including Fayetteville, Springdale, Bentonville, Harrison, Mountain Home, Pocahontas, and also Piggott. US 62 runs concurrent with several highways in Arkansas including Interstate 49 and U.S. Route 71 between Fayetteville and Bentonville, U.S. Route 412 through much of the state, U.S. Route 65 in the Harrison area, and with U.S. Route 63 and U.S. Route 67 in northeast Arkansas.

== Route description ==
=== Northwest Arkansas ===
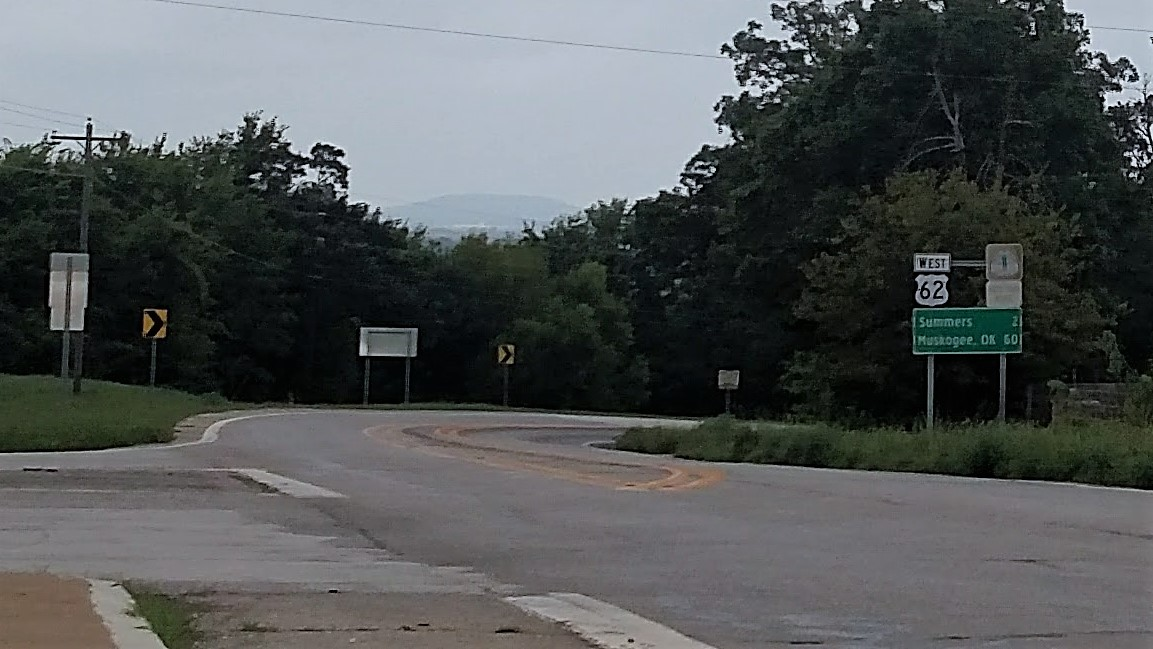
US 62 at about 60 miles from the Oklahoma border

U.S. Route 62 enters Arkansas from Oklahoma and runs by the Bean Cemetery near Lincoln and the Borden House and Prairie Grove Battlefield Park in Prairie Grove. The route then enters the Northwest Arkansas metro area, including the cities of Fayetteville, Rogers, and Bentonville. The route concurs with I-49/US 71 through these communities. In Benton County, the route passes Garfield Elementary School near the junction with Arkansas Highway 127 in Garfield before exiting Rogers. The route continues east near the Pea Ridge National Military Park and the Missouri state line before entering Carroll County.

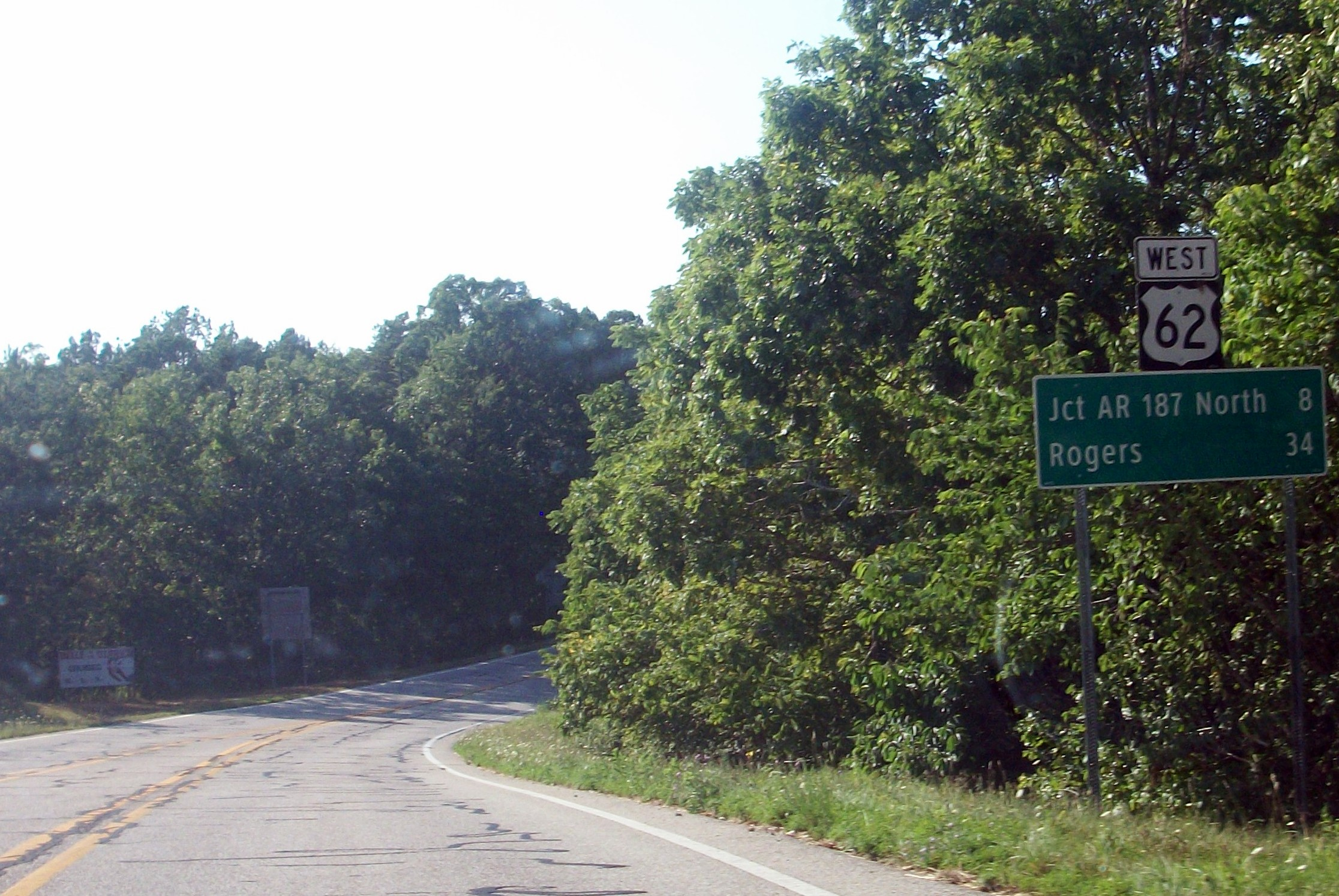
US 62 in Carroll County west of Eureka Springs.

=== The Ozark Mountains ===
US 62 winds through the Ozarks, passing through sparsely populated scenic country and small towns. US 62 passes the Thorncrown Chapel, the Tall Pines Motor Inn, and the historic U.S. 62 White River Bridge near Eureka Springs. The route begins a concurrency with U.S. Route 412 in Alpena that continues east to Imboden. Also, US 62/US 412 meet U.S. Route 65 in Harrison. In Marion County, the route meets US 62S in Pyatt and the US 62 Bridge over Crooked Creek outside of town. During this stretch, US 62 crosses two of the nine Arkansas Scenic Byways, the Pig Trail and Scenic Highway 7. Continuing east, the route passes a former alignment of US 62 before entering Yellville. East of Yellville, the route enters Cotter, Arkansas, Gassville, and Mountain Home, Arkansas in Baxter County and crosses over Norfork Lake in Henderson, Arkansas to enter rural Fulton County.

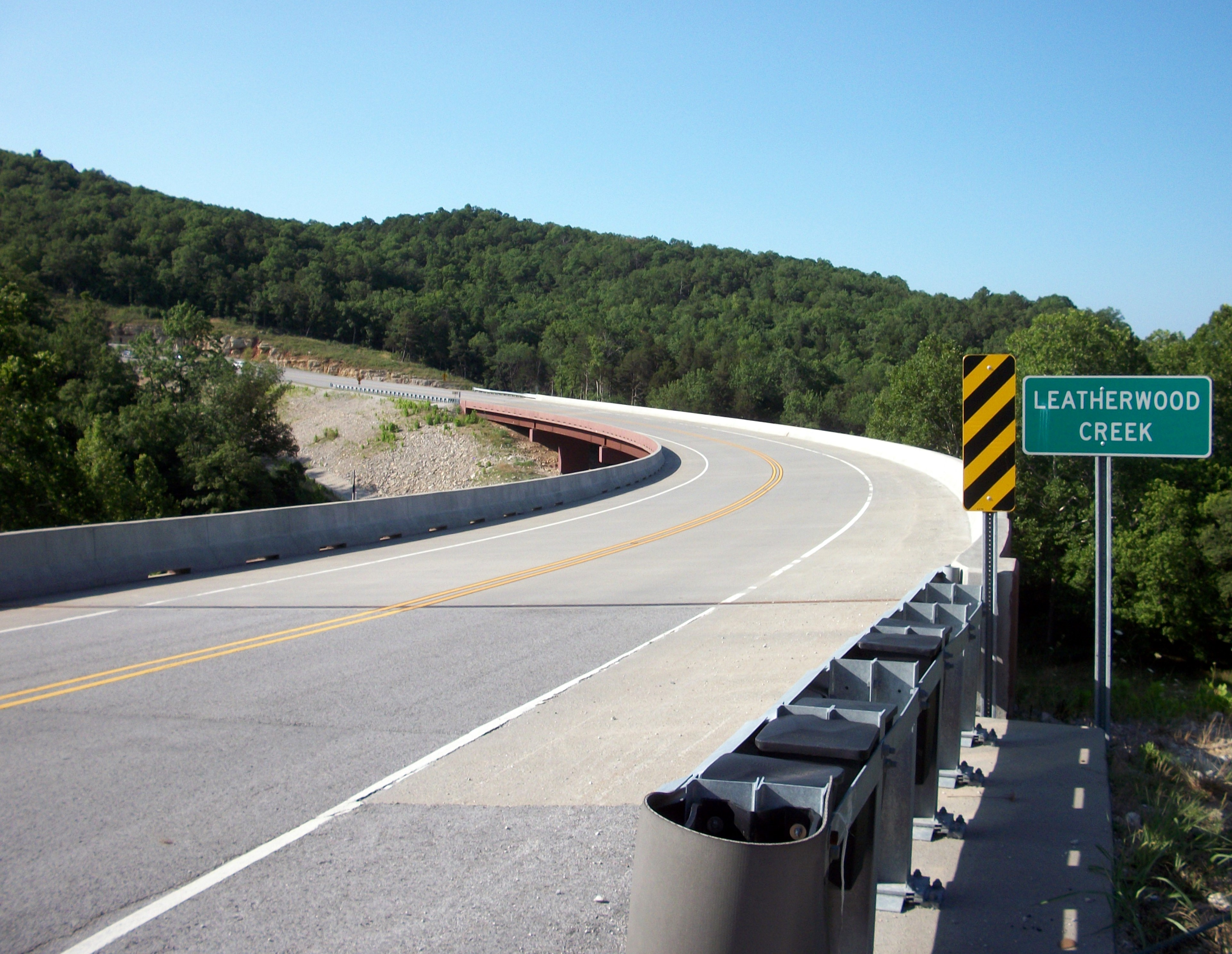
Bridge over Leatherwood Creek west of Eureka Springs.

After passing through Fulton County, US 62/US 412 enters Sharp County. In Ash Flat, US 62/US 412 serves as the northern terminus of U.S. Route 167. After passing around Cherokee Village, Arkansas, the route enters Hardy. In Hardy, US 62/US 412/US 63 Business passes four properties on the National Register of Historic Places in Arkansas: the Carrie Tucker House, the Sherman Bates House, the Fred Graham House, and Web Long House and Motel. US 62/US 412 also meets U.S. Route 63, which is mostly a patchwork of concurrencies throughout the state. The routes continue together to Imboden, when US 63/US 412 break and continue south, where US 62/AR 115 continues over the St. Louis-San Francisco Overpass headed north into Randolph County and Crowley's Ridge.

=== Crowley's Ridge ===
In Randolph County, US 62 passes by cotton fields until Pocahontas, when the route meets US 67. The route concurs with US 67 east until Corning in Clay County. The route runs east through Crowley's Ridge to Piggott, and enters Missouri near St. Francis.

== History ==
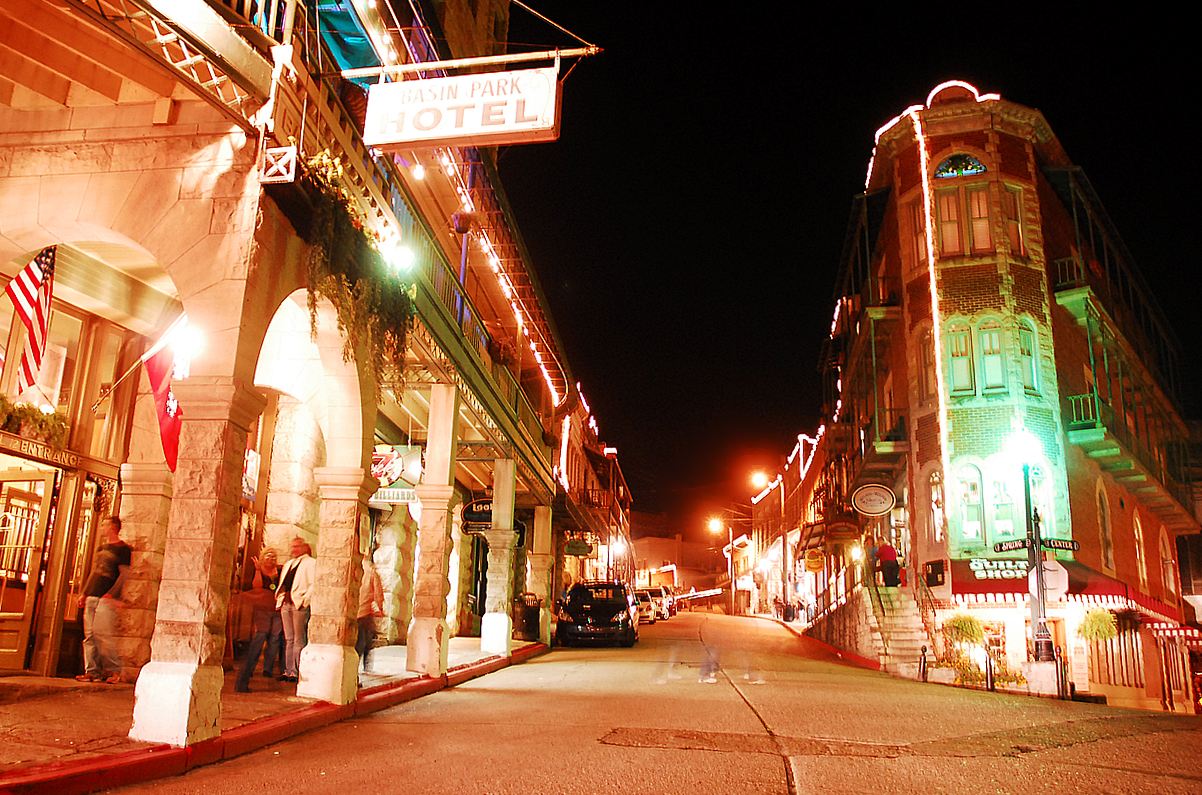
Spring Street in Eureka Springs was originally US 62 - City Route.

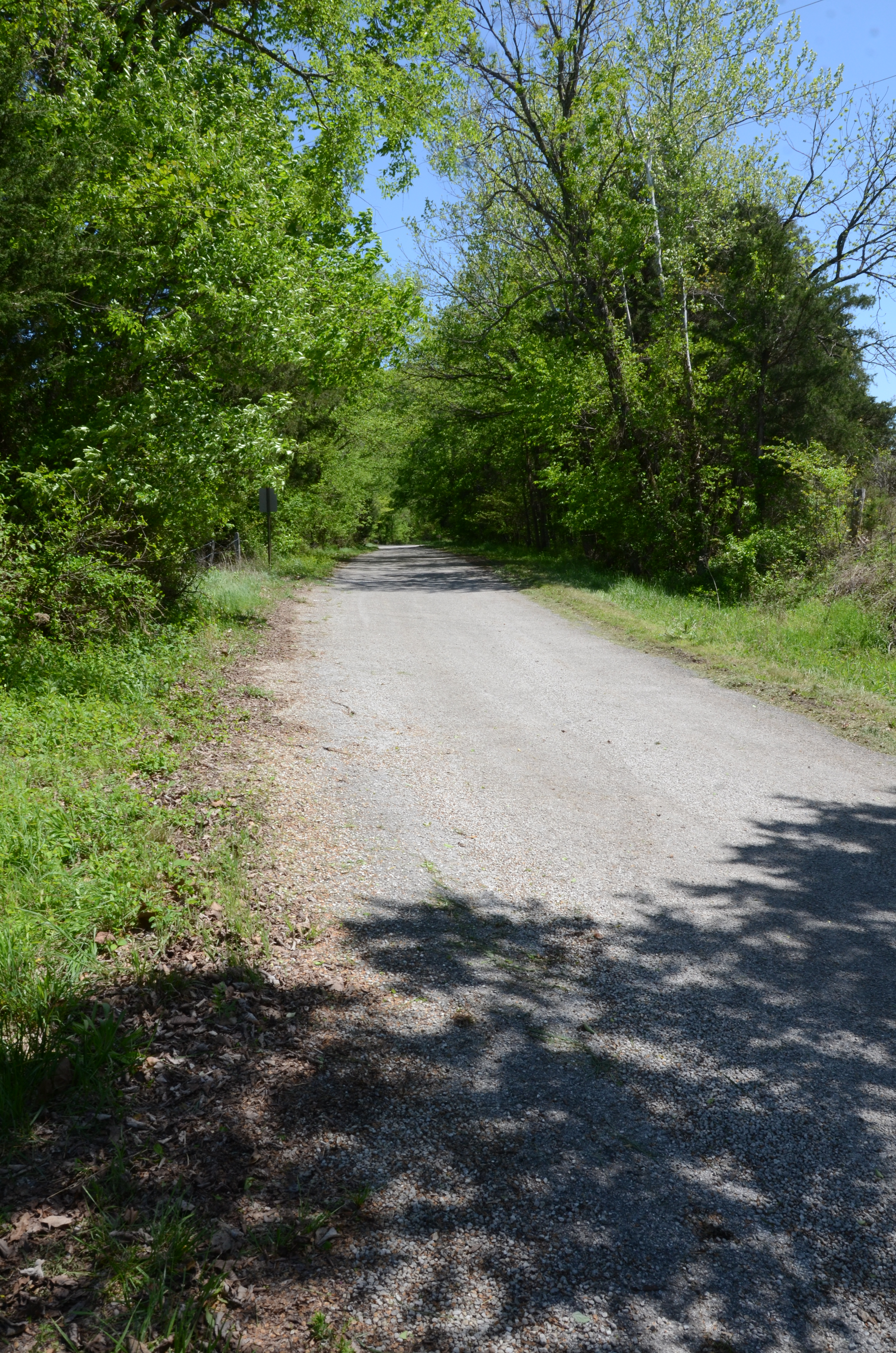
Old Highway 62 near Busch

The route was originally a trail known as the Ozark Trail, which was the main series of routes in the area prior to the construction of U.S. Route 66. The Ozark Trails Association was responsible for maintaining and marking the routes, with William Hope Harvey in charge. Harvey wanted an auto trail from Oklahoma to his resort town Monte Ne, which he established after retiring from the railroad business. He had grand visions of trails connecting Monte Ne with St. Louis, Kansas City, Wichita, Kansas, and Oklahoma City, and points west. U.S. Route 62 from Gateway to Eureka Springs was also designated part of The Jefferson Highway, although the highway was not really marked and frequently shifted. The highway was listed as a "Proposed Primary Federal Aid Road" on a state map in the first issue of "Arkansas Highways Magazine" (1924), but not numbered.

The road brought much traffic through the hills of Arkansas, previously resistant to development. Eureka Springs was a popular stop on the route, with many motor inns and a vibrant downtown. Nearby Arkansas Highway 23 (The Pig Trail) further added tourists to the community. Further east, cities of Mountain Home, Cotter, and Flippin grew significantly with US 62's traffic. Rough terrain interspersed with large waterways caused the need for large bridges, including the Cotter Bridge (which replaced a ferry system) and the St. Louis-San Francisco Overpass. A 1981 study indicated a need of 31 climbing lanes from Harrison to Hardy (approx. 110 miles (180 km)) necessary for safety purposes, indicative of the rough terrain.

Some historic alignments of the old road still exist with original pavement. One section, built between 1932 and bypassed in 1952, is located between Busch and Eureka Springs on either side of the White River. On the north side of the river Carroll County Route 109 follows the alignment to the former river crossing, where only concrete bridge piers remain to be seen. On the south side County Route 107 continues southward, eventually rejoining the modern alignment. This section was listed on the National Register of Historic Places in 2008.

== Major intersections ==
County	Location	mi	km	Exit	Destinations	Notes
Washington		0.0	0.0		US 62 west – Muskogee	Continuation into Oklahoma
Washington	Summers	2.5	4.0		AR 59 north – Siloam Springs	
Washington		4.1	6.6		AR 59 south – Van Buren	
Washington	Lincoln	10.3	16.6		AR 45 south – Canehill	
Washington					US 62B east – Prairie Grove	
Washington	Prairie Grove	16.9	27.2		US 62B west – Prairie Grove	
Washington		18.8	30.3		AR 170 east	
Washington	Farmington	22.9	36.9		AR 170 west (Hunter Street)	
Washington	Fayetteville	25.7	41.4	62	I-49 south (US 71 south / South Fulbright Expressway) / AR 180 east (Martin Luther King Jr. Boulevard) – Fort Smith, University of Arkansas, Fayetteville National Cemetery	Western end of I-49/US 71 concurrency
Washington	Fayetteville	27.5	44.3	64	AR 16 west / AR 16S east (Wedington Drive)	
Washington	Fayetteville	28.4	45.7	65	Stephen Carr Memorial Boulevard	Porter Road rededicated in July 2022
Washington	Fayetteville	29.7	47.8	67A	AR 112 (Garland Avenue)	Access to University of Arkansas
Washington	Fayetteville	30.2	48.6	67B	US 71B north (North Fulbright Expressway)	Interchange opened around November 2017; access to Washington Regional Medical Center and Fayetteville Historic District
Washington	Johnson	31	50	69	Johnson Mill Boulevard	
Washington	Springdale			70	Don Tyson Parkway	Opened July 7, 2014
Washington	Springdale	36	58	72	US 412 (Sunset Avenue)	Future exit 258
Washington	Springdale	37.4	60.2	73	Elm Springs Road	
Benton		76.15	122.55	76	Wagon Wheel Road	
Benton	Lowell	77.55	124.80	77	I-42 west (Springdale Northern Bypass) – Elm Springs, Cave Springs	Current eastern terminus and exit 10 on I-42; access to Northwest Arkansas Regional Airport
Benton	Lowell	78.90	126.98	78	AR 264 (West Monroe Avenue)	
Benton	Rogers	81.01	130.37	81	Pleasant Grove Road	
Benton	Rogers	82.79	133.24	82	Promenade Boulevard / West Pauline Whittaker Parkway	
Benton	Rogers	83.90	135.02	83	Pinnacle Hills Parkway / West New Hope Road	Future exit 269
Benton	Rogers–Bentonville line	85.30	137.28	85	US 71B south (West Walnut Street) / SE Walton Boulevard	
Benton	Bentonville	44.6	71.8	86	I-49 north (US 71 north) / AR 102 west (SE 14th Street) – Bella Vista, Bentonville, Centerton	Eastern end of I-49/US 71 concurrency
Benton	Rogers	51.0	82.1		AR 94 east – Rogers Business District	Western end of AR 94 concurrency
Benton	Rogers	51.4	82.7		AR 12 east / AR 94 west (North Second Street) – Little Flock, Pea Ridge, Historic District, Hobbs State Park Conservation Area, Prairie Creek Park, Rogers Historical Museum	Eastern end of AR 94 concurrency
Benton		57.8	93.0		AR 72 west – Pea Ridge	
Benton	Garfield	62.8	101.1		AR 127 – Beaver Lake, Lost Bridge Park	
Benton	Gateway	66.7	107.3		AR 37 north – Seligman, MO	
Carroll					AR 187 north – Beaver, Holiday Island	
Carroll					AR 187 south – Beaver Dam, Beaver Lake	
Carroll		79.5	127.9		AR 187 north	
Carroll	Eureka Springs				Historic Loop - Eureka Springs Business District	Former US 62B
Carroll	Eureka Springs				AR 23 north – Holiday Island, Beaver	Western end of AR 23 concurrency
Carroll	Eureka Springs				AR 23 south – Huntsville	Eastern end of AR 23 concurrency
Carroll		92.2	148.4		AR 143 north / AR 980 – Grandview, Airport	
Carroll	Berryville	95.0	152.9		US 62S	
Carroll	Berryville	96.1	154.7		AR 221 south (West Carl Avenue)	Western end of AR 221 concurrency
Carroll	Berryville				AR 21 north / AR 221 north	Eastern end of AR 221 concurrency; western end of AR 21 concurrency
Carroll	Berryville				AR 21 south – Kingston, Boxley	Eastern end of AR 21 concurrency
Carroll					AR 103 south – Rule	
Carroll	Green Forest				AR 103 north – Oak Grove	
Carroll	Green Forest				AR 311 north (Carroll Avenue)	
Carroll	Green Forest				Tyson Avenue (AR 311 south)	
Boone	Alpena	114	183		US 412 west – Huntsville, Springdale	Western end of US 412 concurrency
Boone		116	187		AR 392 east – Batavia	
Boone		119	192		US 65 north – Branson, MO, Springfield, MO	Interchange; western end of US 65 concurrency
Boone	Harrison	122	196		AR 980 – Airport	
Boone	Harrison	124	200		AR 43 north	
Boone	Harrison	124	200		North Main Street - Business District	Former US 65B
Boone	Harrison				AR 7 north – Bergman, Lead Hill, Diamond City	Western end of AR 7 concurrency
Boone	Harrison				US 65B south / AR 7 south – Jasper, Russellville, Business District	Eastern end of AR 7 concurrency
Boone	Harrison				US 65B north (South Main Street) – Harrison Business District, Northark College South Campus	
Boone	Bellefonte	131	211		AR 206 west	
Boone		132	212		US 65 south – Little Rock	Eastern end of US 65 concurrency
Marion		143.9	231.6		AR 125 south – Eros, Bruno	Western end of AR 125 concurrency
Marion	Pyatt	144.4	232.4		US 62S – Pyatt Business District	
Marion		150.1	241.6		AR 125 north – Dodd City	Eastern end of AR 125 concurrency
Marion		153.0	246.2		AR 202 east – Summit	
Marion	Yellville	154.5	248.6		US 62B east (Old Main Street)	
Marion	Yellville	154.8	249.1		AR 14 west (Panther Avenue) – Summit, Lead Hill	Western end of AR 14 concurrency
Marion	Yellville	155.0	249.4		US 62B west (Berry Street)	
Marion	Yellville	155.1	249.6		AR 14 east – Ozark Folk Center State Park, Blanchard Springs Caverns, Buffalo National River Buffalo Point	Eastern end of AR 14 concurrency
Marion		159.9	257.3		AR 178 east – Flippin, Bull Shoals, Bull Shoals White River State Park	
Marion		162.5	261.5		AR 101 south – Rea Valley	
Marion		163.1	262.5		US 62B east – Cotter	
Baxter	Cotter	165.9	267.0		US 62B west / CR 1 (Denton Ferry Road) – Cotter Business District	
Baxter	Gassville	167.3	269.2		AR 345 south (Cotter Road)	
Baxter	Gassville	168.3	270.9		AR 126 north – Ozark Regional Airport	
Baxter		171.3	275.7		AR 126 south – Buffalo City	
Baxter	Mountain Home	173.6	279.4		US 62B east – Mountain Home	
Baxter	Mountain Home	174.2	280.3		AR 201 – Arkansas State University Mountain Home Campus	
Baxter		176.5	284.0		AR 5	Interchange
Baxter		178.2	286.8		AR 178 (Buzzard Roost Road)	
Baxter	Mountain Home	179.3	288.6		US 62B west – Mountain Home	
Baxter		183.6	295.5		AR 101 north – Gamaliel	
Fulton		193.7	311.7		AR 87 – Vidette, Elizabeth	
Fulton	Viola	201.6	324.4		AR 223 – Moody, MO, Bexar	
Fulton	Salem	210.4	338.6		US 62B east	
Fulton	Salem	211.0	339.6		AR 395 south	
Fulton	Salem	211.4	340.2		AR 9 to AR 395 north – Business District, Mammoth Spring, Melbourne	
Fulton	Glencoe	219.0	352.4		AR 289 south – Horseshoe Bend	
Fulton		226.2	364.0		AR 289 north – Saddle, Mammoth Spring	
Sharp	Ash Flat	228.6	367.9		US 167 south (Ash Flat Drive) – Batesville	
Fulton	No major junctions					
Sharp	Cherokee Village–Highland line	232.3	373.9		AR 175S north – Cherokee Village	
Sharp	Hardy	237.4	382.1		AR 175 south (Stone Creek Road) to AR 289 – Cherokee Village	Western end of AR 175 concurrency
Sharp	Hardy	238.2	383.3		AR 342 east (West Riverview Drive) – Harold E. Alexander WMA	
Sharp	Hardy	238.9	384.5		US 63B south – Hardy, Historic District	Western end of US 63B concurrency
Sharp	Hardy	240.2	386.6		US 63 north – Mammoth Spring	Eastern end of US 63B concurrency; western end of US 63 concurrency
Sharp	Hardy				US 63B north – Hardy	
Sharp	Hardy	245.3	394.8		AR 175 north – Wirth	Eastern end of AR 175 concurrency
Sharp		250.4	403.0		AR 58 west – Williford	
Sharp		252.4	406.2		AR 58E west – Williford	
Lawrence	Ravenden	256.8	413.3		AR 90 east – Ravenden Springs	
Randolph	No major junctions					
Lawrence	Imboden	260.9	419.9		AR 115 south – Smithville, Cave City	
Lawrence	Imboden	261.5	420.8		US 63 south / US 412 east – Imboden Business District, Black Rock, Hoxie	Eastern end of US 63/US 412 concurrency
Spring River		261.7	421.2	St. Louis-San Francisco Overpass		
Randolph	Pocahontas	272.1	437.9		AR 166 south – Old Davidsonville State Park	
Randolph	Pocahontas	274.1	441.1		US 67 south – Walnut Ridge	Western end of US 67 concurrency
Randolph	Pocahontas	274.1	441.1		AR 90 north (Broadway Street) to AR 115 – Ravenden Springs, Pocahontas Business District, Historic Courthouse	
Randolph	Pocahontas	276.6	445.1		AR 166 north – Engelberg	
Randolph		285.2	459.0		US 67B north – Biggers	
Randolph	Reyno	289.2	465.4		AR 328 west – Reyno	
Clay	Datto	291.6	469.3		US 67B north – Datto	
Clay		293.7	472.7		AR 211 north – Success	
Clay		296.7	477.5		AR 980 – Airport	
Clay	Corning	300.3	483.3		US 67 north – St. Louis, MO	Eastern end of US 67 concurrency
Clay		304.3	489.7		AR 135 south – Paragould	
Clay	McDougal	309.0	497.3		AR 141 south – Boydsville	
Clay	Pollard	316.2	508.9		AR 139 north – Qulin, MO	
Clay	Piggott	322.3	518.7		US 49 south / AR 1 south – Paragould, Gulfport, MS	Western end of AR 1 concurrency
Clay		324.0	521.4		AR 139 south – Holly Island	
Clay		324.3	521.9		AR 1 north – Holcomb, MO	Eastern end of AR 1 concurrency
Clay		329.9	530.9		US 62 east – Malden	Continuation into Missouri
1.000 mi = 1.609 km; 1.000 km = 0.621 mi: Concurrency terminus

U.S. Route 62
Previous state: Oklahoma	Arkansas	Next state: Missouri
