= Monkey Run, Arkansas =

- Unincorporated community
- Monkey Run's position in Arkansas Monkey Run, Arkansas (the United States)
- Country: United States
- State: Arkansas
- County: Baxter
- Elevation: 712 ft (217 m)
- Time zone: UTC-6 (Central (CST))
  - Summer (DST): UTC-5 (CDT)
- GNIS feature ID: 77681

Monkey Run is an unincorporated community in Baxter County, Arkansas, United States. The community is on Arkansas Highway 126 approximately 1.5 mile (2.4 km) south of the Ozark Regional Airport and 4.5 miles (7.2 km) west of Mountain Home via Arkansas Highway 178.

== History ==
The community's heyday was 1900 to the Great Depression. Seven different zinc mines operated around Monkey Run, with ore shipped by wagon to Cotter, Arkansas. The community was originally named Pilgrim's Rest, but was renamed by a storekeeper who watched a group of boys playing tag and exclaimed, "watch them monkeys run". A later attempt by a vegetable canning plant to change the name to Pleasant Valley never took hold.
