= Midway, Baxter County, Arkansas =

Midway, Arkansas
- Census-designated place
- Location within Arkansas
- Coordinates: 36°23′28″N 92°28′24″W
- Country: United States
- State: Arkansas
- County: Baxter

Area
  - Total: 5.77 sq mi (14.94 km^{2})
  - Land: 5.76 sq mi (14.91 km^{2})
  - Water: 0.012 sq mi (0.03 km^{2})
- Elevation: 919 ft (280 m)

Population (2020)
  - Total: 1,036
  - Density: 180.0/sq mi (69.49/km^{2})
- Time zone: UTC-6 (Central (CST))
  - Summer (DST): UTC-5 (CDT)
- ZIP code: 72651
- Area code: 870
- GNIS feature ID: 2612129
- FIPS Code: 05-45530

Midway is a census-designated place in Baxter County, Arkansas, United States. Midway is 5.5 miles (8.9 km) northwest of Mountain Home. Per the 2020 census, the population was 1,036. Midway has a post office with ZIP code 72651. Long home to a rural trading post, Midway became a boomtown during the construction of the Bull Shoals Dam, and later evolved to serve tourists and retirees attracted to the lake.

== Demographics ==
Historical population
Census	Pop.	Note	%±
2010	1,084		—
2020	1,036		−4.4%
U.S. Decennial Census; 2010 2020

=== 2020 census ===
Midway CDP, Arkansas – racial and ethnic composition Note: the US Census treats Hispanic/Latino as an ethnic category. This table excludes Latinos from the racial categories and assigns them to a separate category. Hispanics/Latinos may be of any race.
Race / ethnicity (NH = Non-Hispanic)	Pop 2010	Pop 2020	% 2010	% 2020
White alone (NH)	1,015	954	93.63%	92.08%
Black or African American alone (NH)	1	1	0.09%	0.10%
Native American or Alaska Native alone (NH)	8	3	0.74%	0.29%
Asian alone (NH)	3	4	0.28%	0.39%
Pacific Islander alone (NH)	0	0	0.00%	0.00%
Some other race alone (NH)	0	0	0.00%	0.00%
Mixed-race or multi-racial (NH)	20	54	1.85%	5.21%
Hispanic or Latino (any race)	37	20	3.41%	1.93%
Total	1,084	1,036	100.00%	100.00%

== Transportation ==
Midway is at the intersection of Highway 5, Highway 126 and Highway 178. Highway 5 provides access to Mountain Home to the east and extends about eight miles to the north to the Arkansas - Missouri border. Highway 126 provides access to the Baxter County Regional Airport to the south and on to Gassville. Highway 178 provides access to Lakeview, Bull Shoals and the Bull Shoals Lake to the west.

== Education ==
Midway is in the Mountain Home School District.
