= Cotter, Arkansas =

- City
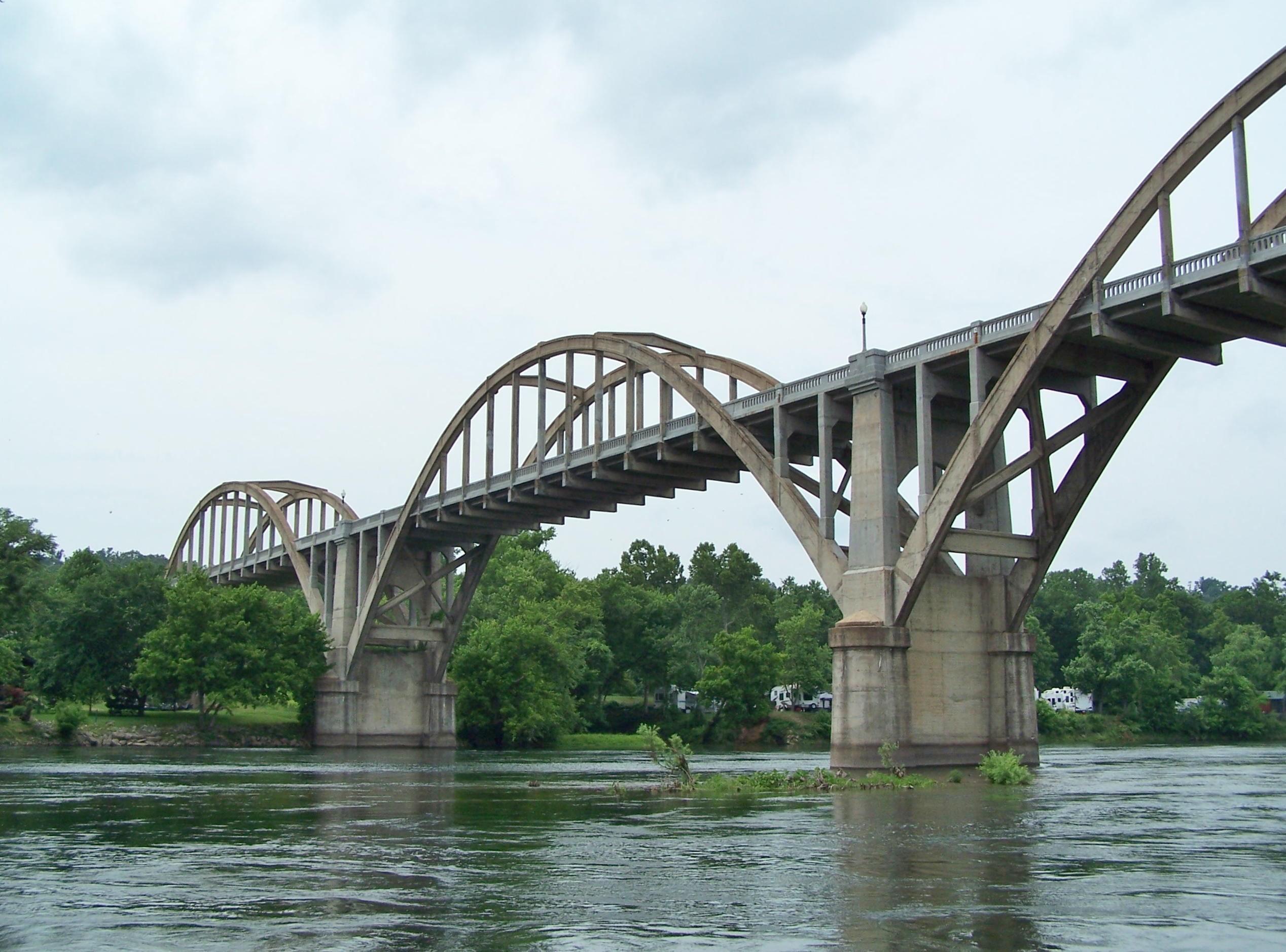
- Cotter Bridge over the White River

- Seal Logo
- Motto: "Trout capital U.S.A."
- Location of Cotter in Baxter County, Arkansas
- Coordinates: 36°16′55″N 92°31′16″W
- Country: United States
- State: Arkansas
- County: Baxter
- Incorporated: November 23, 1905

Government
  - Type: Mayor–council
  - Mayor: Mac Caradine

Area
  - Total: 2.45 sq mi (6.34 km^{2})
  - Land: 2.45 sq mi (6.34 km^{2})
  - Water: 0 sq mi (0.00 km^{2})
- Elevation: 640 ft (200 m)

Population (2020)
  - Total: 886
  - Estimate (2025): 946 ▲
  - Density: 362.0/sq mi (139.78/km^{2})
- Time zone: UTC-6 (Central (CST))
  - Summer (DST): UTC-5 (CDT)
- ZIP code: 72626
- Area code: 870
- FIPS code: 05-15490
- GNIS feature ID: 2404136
- Website: www.cotterar.gov

Cotter is a city in Baxter County, Arkansas, United States. The population was 886 at the 2020 census.

== History ==
Native American Bluff Dwellers were the original inhabitants of the area now known as Cotter for centuries before settlers arrived. When Native Americans were moved westward on the Trail of Tears, approximately 1000 Cherokees crossed just a short distance upriver from the current location of Downtown Cotter.

=== Exploration and settlement ===
In 1819, Henry Schoolcraft was exploring the Ozarks and spent a night in the Cotter area. He said of the area,

White River is one of the most beautiful and enchanting streams, and by far the most transparent, which discharge their waters into the Mississippi ... We here behold the assembled tributaries flowing in a smooth, broad. deep, and majestic current ... skirted at a short distance by mountains of the most imposing grandeur.... [The] extreme limpidity and want of colour ... was early seized upon by the French traders on first visiting this stream, in calling it "La Rivière Blanche" (White River).

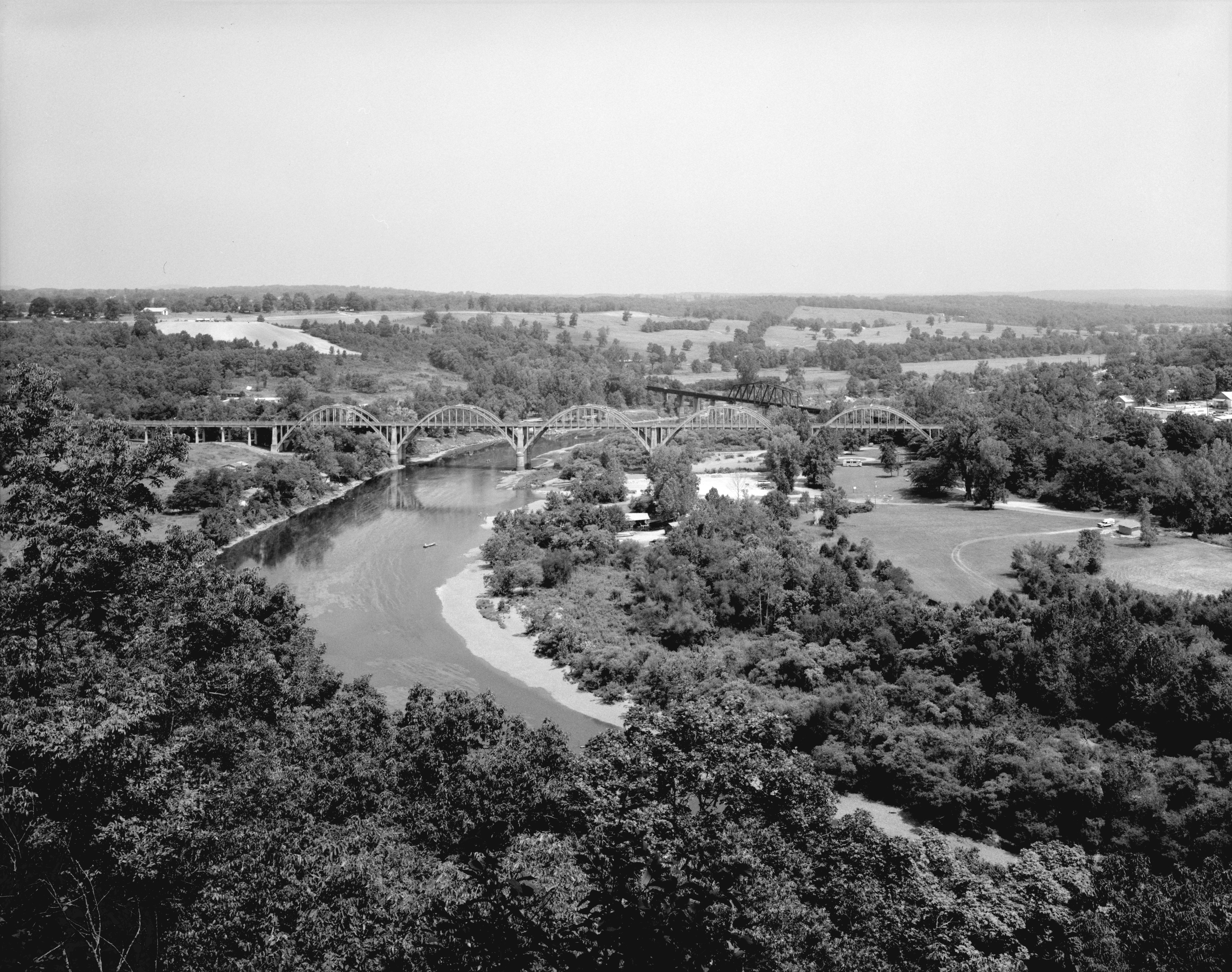
The Cotter Bridge was critical in the development of the Ozarks.

In 1868, Jonathan Cunningham homesteaded 300 acres on a peninsula of the White River. In 1883, he sold it to L.P. Kemp. During that time, there was a ferry landing about 100 yards downriver called Lake's Ferry. The only power to operate the ferry was the current of the river. At the time, it was the only means of transportation across. Families would travel from Mountain Home and Yellville to visit the area, picnic, fish, and enjoy the nearby spring that was created naturally via the caves under the ground.

Future president, Herbert Hoover, spent the summer of 1892 helping Geologist John C. Branner survey the northern Ozarks. By the early 1900s, there were many mining companies active in both Baxter and Marion Counties. Cotter quickly became a central point where minerals could be shipped via steamboat to much larger cities in central Arkansas or southern Missouri.

In 1902, the city opened a post office. In 1903, L.P. Kemp sold the 300 acres to the Red Bud Realty Company for an unknown amount. Red Bud's principles, W.V. Powell, Jerry South, and Thomas Combs all ended up having avenues named in their honor. A school opened in 1904. On July 7, 1904, thirty-six leaders in the community petitioned to incorporate the town. On November 23, 1905, the city officially opened.

=== White River Line ===
Seeking to capitalize on the growing trade in the area, the St. Louis, Iron Mountain and Southern Railway (St. L., I. M. & S.), commonly known as the Iron Mountain (merged into the Missouri Pacific in 1917), announced plans to open the White River Line which would run through the area and would connect with the main line in Lake's Landing. In 1905, the Iron Mountain bought the area and sold over one thousand lots, mostly to railroad employees. The city was incorporated in 1905 as Cotter, Arkansas. By that time, the population was over 600. The town was named after William Cotter, an official for the Iron Mountain. The materials required to build the town and railroad had to be brought in by steamboats down the White River. Once the railroad was completed, the use of steamboats on the rivers of Arkansas decreased and eventually ceased altogether. In 1906, the first passenger train arrived, and the tourist era began. The Missouri Pacific was merged in the Union Pacific in 1982, and the White River division was spun off as the Missouri and Northern Arkansas Railroad MNA in 1992.

=== Expulsion of African Americans ===
The construction of the railroad brought many laborers to the area including African Americans. After the railroad had been completed, the sentiment among many white residents had turned against the Blacks. In 1904, the anti-Black attitude was encouraged by a visit from Arkansas Governor Jeff Davis who gave a racist speech to the residents of Cotter. In April of 1906, an article was printed in the local newspaper called the Cotter Courier. The Courier ran an editorial titled "Too Many Negroes" stating that local residents had a "feeling that the negroes should move on." As a result, all African Americans had been run out of town by August of 1906 with the exception of the three members of the Mason family. During the 1950's, travel-related advertisements boasted that Cotter was "100 per cent white." The 1960 census recorded zero African American residents in Cotter.

=== Cotter Bridge ===
The mercurial White River caused many motorists problems, as the nearest crossing was over 100 miles (160 km) to the north in Branson, Missouri. An inconvenient ferry system made the need for a bridge apparent. Locals wanted a bridge, but they strongly opposed a toll bridge. Arkansas did not have a central highway body at the time, and was instead a patchwork of "road districts", which made the bridge-building efforts even more difficult. Without a toll, funding was not available until Arkansas Highway 12 was redesignated U.S. Route 62 in 1930. The Cotter Bridge was constructed through the area using a unique rainbow arch design.

=== Flooding ===
In 1927 there was flooding.

== Geography ==
According to the United States Census Bureau, the city has a total area of 2.5 square miles (6.5 km^{2}), all land.

== Government ==
=== Mayor–city council ===
Cotter operates within the mayor–city council form of government. The mayor is elected by a citywide election to serve as the Chief Executive Officer (CEO) of the city by presiding over all city functions, policies, rules and laws. Once elected, the mayor also allocates duties to city employees. Mayors serve two-year terms and can serve unlimited terms. The city council is the unicameral legislative of the City, consisting of six aldermen. Also included in the council's duties is balancing the city's budget and passing ordinances. The body also controls the representatives of specialized city commissions underneath their jurisdiction. Two aldermen are elected from each of the city's four wards.

==== Current mayor and council ====
Mayor: McGeorge "Mac" Caradine
Ward 1 Position 1: Carolyn Gill
Ward 1 Position 2: Sheila Wingard
Ward 2 Position 1: Charles "Chuck" Sugg
Ward 2 Position 2: Linda McCarthy
Ward 3 Position 1: Mertice Kray
Ward 3 Position 2: Vacant

==== List of mayors ====
Cotter mayors
	Mayor	Years served	Years lived
1	Charles B. Eaton	1909–1922	1861–1923
2	Roderick M. Ruthven	1922–1935	1885–1962
3	Hiram C. Lonon	1935–1943	1884–1970
4	B.R. Pratt	1943–1947	TBD–1949
5	Hiram C. Lonon	1947–1953	1884–1970
6	R. Howell Freeman	1953–1963	1903–1964
7	Frank G. Wallick	1963–1965	Unknown
8	Rex S. Bayless	1965–1987	1918–2010
9	Lewis “Cajun” Dennis	1987–1991	TBD–2011
10	Rex S. Bayless	1991–1995	1918–2010
11	W.R. "Bill" Jennings	1995–1999	1926–2012
12	J.D. Pratt	1999–2003	Unknown
13	W.R. "Bill" Jennings	2003–2005	1926–2012
14	Elwood "Mo" Monsley	2005–2007	1935–2015
15	David J. McNair	2007–2010	Unknown
16	Steven Raines	2010–2010	Unknown
17	Peggy Hammack	2011–2019	Living
18	McGeorge "Mac" Caradine	2019–present	Living

==== List of police chiefs ====
Cotter police chiefs
Police chief	Years served
John W. Hall	1905–1906
Oscar Massey	1906–1908
Sam Mankins	1908–1910
M. Tanksley	1910–1920
Sam Mankins	1920–1924
Hez Robertson	1924–1936
Roy Nesbit	1936–1938
Freeman Martin	1938–1943
C.E. Wyland	1943–TBD
Unknown	TBD–1970
Chris Bland	1970–1970
Harold DePriest	1970–1971
Ray Kirby	1971–1972
William Green	1972–1973
Elvin Weaver	1973–1978
Melvin Weaver	1978–1980
Frank DePriest	1980–1986
Jack Burkhart	1987–2005
Ronald Weaver	2005–2006
Joe Robison	2006–2006
Scott Thrasher	2007–2010
Clinton Tilton	2010–2017
Travis Hopson	2017–present

== Demographics ==
Historical population
Census	Pop.	Note	%±
1910	894		—
1920	884		−1.1%
1930	1,064		20.4%
1940	903		−15.1%
1950	1,089		20.6%
1960	683		−37.3%
1970	858		25.6%
1980	920		7.2%
1990	867		−5.8%
2000	921		6.2%
2010	970		5.3%
2020	886		−8.7%
2025 (est.)	946	▲	6.8%
U.S. Decennial Census

=== 2020 census ===
Cotter racial composition
Race	Number	Percentage
White (non-Hispanic)	784	88.49%
Black or African American (non-Hispanic)	1	0.11%
Native American	7	0.79%
Asian	4	0.45%
Other/mixed	68	7.67%
Hispanic or Latino	22	2.48%

As of the 2020 United States census, there were 886 people, 419 households, and 271 families residing in the city.

=== 2010 census ===
As of the census of 2010, there were 1,078 people, 472 households and 293 families residing in the city. The population density was 373.6 inhabitants per square mile (144.2/km^{2}). There were 501 housing units at an average density of 203.2 per square mile (78.5/km^{2}). The racial makeup of the city was 97.07% White, 0.87% Native American, 0.22% Asian, and 1.85% from two or more races. 1.52% of the population were Hispanic or Latino of any race.

There were 545 households, out of which 20.8% had children under the age of 18 living with them, 48.5% were married couples living together, 8.6% had a female householder with no husband present, and 40.0% were non-families. 35.4% of all households were made up of individuals, and 16.7% had someone living alone who was 65 years of age or older. The average household size was 2.08 and the average family size was 2.67.

In the city, the population was spread out, with 19.7% under the age of 18, 8.7% from 18 to 24, 24.8% from 25 to 44, 26.7% from 45 to 64, and 20.2% who were 65 years of age or older. The median age was 43 years. For every 100 females, there were 97.2 males. For every 100 females age 18 and over, there were 99.5 males.

The median income for a household in the city was $22,857, and the median income for a family was $34,375. Males had a median income of $26,298 versus $17,266 for females. The per capita income for the city was $15,893. About 11.9% of families and 16.8% of the population were below the poverty line, including 18.3% of those under age 18 and 13.3% of those age 65 or over.

== Education ==
Formal education in Cotter began with Miss Cora Patterson teaching 40 students under a tent on January 4, 1904. In 1915, Cotter schools merged with the East Cotter School District, with the Gassville and Whiteville districts merging into Cotter in 1948.

Today, public education is provided by the Cotter School District including Cotter High School (grades 7 through 12) and Amanda Gist Elementary School (kindergarten through grade 6).

== Media ==
Cotter and Baxter County are within the Springfield, Missouri TV market.

The city has been home to five newspapers over the years, the longest lasting being the Cotter Courier (1903-c. 1918) and The Cotter Record (1911–1937). Publications lasting only a year or so include The White River Headlight, The Screech Owl, and the Bull Shoals Gazette. Today, Cotter news is covered by The Baxter Bulletin.

== Infrastructure ==
=== List of highways ===
- US 62/US 412
- U.S. Route 62 Business
- Arkansas Highway 345

=== Railroads ===
Cotter has one local railroad, the Missouri and Northern Arkansas Railroad. The MNA leases the track from Newport to Kansas City, Missouri, from the Union Pacific. The regular train traffic are empty coal trains from The Independence power plant, as well as a north and south local out of Cotter. Additionally, there is a small railyard and crew change point

=== Airports ===
Cotter is accessible to two separate commercial airports, Ozark Regional Airport (Baxter County) and Flippin Municipal Airport (Marion County). There is also a rural air field, Valley Airport, located on Denton Ferry Road, that serves small planes owned by residents.
