= Arkansas Highway 345 =

State highway in Arkansas, United States

Highway 345

Route information
- Maintained by ArDOT
- Length: 3.36 mi (5.41 km)
- Existed: May 23, 1973–present

Major junctions
- South end: US 62B in Cotter
- North end: US 62 / US 412 in Gassville

Location
- Country: United States
- State: Arkansas
- Counties: Baxter

Highway system
- Arkansas Highway System; Interstate; US; State; Business; Spurs; Suffixed; Scenic; Heritage
| ← AR 344 | → AR 346 |

Highway 345 (AR 345, Ark. 345, and Hwy. 345) is a north–south state highway in Baxter County, Arkansas. The route runs 3.36 miles (5.41 km) between U.S. Route 62 Business (US 62 Bus.) in Cotter and US 62/US 412 in Gassville.

== Route description ==
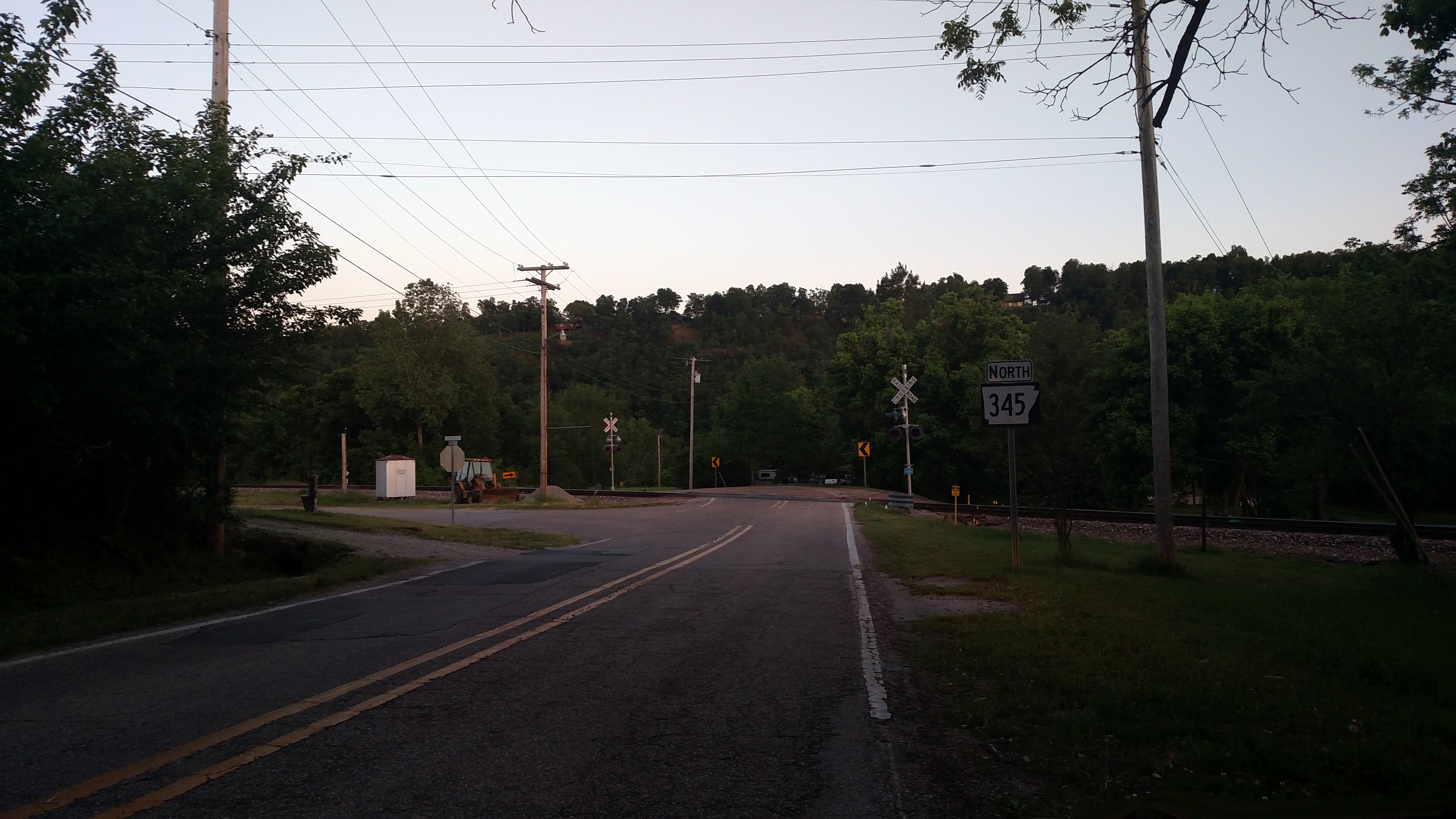
Highway 345 in Cotter

AR 345 begins at the intersection of US 62 Bus., Combs Avenue, and Cotter Road in Cotter. It first heads south on Cotter Road crossing a railroad at-grade. It runs northeast through the southern part of Cotter paralleling the White River before zig-zagging its way north when it enters Gassville and terminates at US 62/US 412.

== History ==
The segment was created on May 23, 1973 pursuant to Act 9 of 1973 by the Arkansas General Assembly. The act directed county judges and legislators to designate up to 12 miles (19 km) of county roads as state highways in each county.

== Major intersections ==
The entire route is in Baxter County.

| Location | mi | km | Destinations | Notes |
|---|---|---|---|---|
| Cotter | 0.00 | 0.00 | US 62B / Combs Avenue | Southern terminus |
| Gassville | 3.36 | 5.41 | US 62 / US 412 (Main Street) – Cotter, Mountain Home | Northern terminus |
1.000 mi = 1.609 km; 1.000 km = 0.621 mi

== See also ==
- Arkansas Highway 345 (1969–2020), former alignment in Gassville
