= Mountain Home School District (Arkansas) =

School district in Arkansas

Mountain Home Public Schools is a school district headquartered in Mountain Home, Arkansas, United States.

Most of the district is in Baxter County, where it includes Mountain Home, Buffalo City, Lakeview, and Midway, along with most of Henderson and a small section of Gassville. The district is partly in Marion County, where it includes Oakland.

== History ==
On July 1, 1986, the Oakland School District consolidated into the Mountain Home School District.

== Schools ==
Secondary education

- Mountain Home High School Career Academies (10–12)
- Mountain Home Junior High School (8–9)
- Pinkston Middle School (6–7)
- Guy Berry Career and Alternative School (7–12)

Early childhood and elementary education

- Hackler Intermediate (3–5)
- Nelson–Wilks–Herron Elementary School (1–2)
- Kindergarten Center
