= Arkansas Highway 345 (1969–2020) =

Former state highway in Arkansas, United States

Highway 345
- AR 345 highlighted in red

Route information
- Maintained by ArDOT
- Length: 0.6 mi (970 m)
- Existed: May 28, 1969–2020

Major junctions
- South end: US 62 / US 412 in Gassville
- North end: AR 126 in Gassville

Location
- Country: United States
- State: Arkansas
- Counties: Baxter

Highway system
- Arkansas Highway System; Interstate; US; State; Business; Spurs; Suffixed; Scenic; Heritage

Highway 345 (AR 345, Ark. 345, and Hwy. 345) is a former state highway in Gassville, Arkansas. Added to the state highway system access to industrial facilities in 1969, the designation was decommissioned and the streets returned to local maintenance in 2020. It was maintained by the Arkansas Department of Transportation (ArDOT).

== Route description ==
AR 345 began at US 62/US 412 and ran north as Lakeview Drive for about 0.33 miles (0.53 km). The designation then turned east onto Vine Street and terminated at AR 126.

== History ==
The route was designated along a city street to serve an industrial area on May 28, 1969, initially only running due north as Lakeview Drive. The route was extended east from the Mar-Bax shirt factory along Vine Street to Highway 126 on July 28, 1977. On March 13, 2019, the Arkansas State Highway Commission agreed to repave the street in cooperation with the City of Gassville, who assumed maintenance of the street following construction.

== Major intersections ==
The entire route was in Gassville, Baxter County.

mi	km	Destinations	Notes
0.0	0.0	US 62 / US 412 (Main Street)	Southern terminus
0.6	0.97	AR 126	Northern terminus
1.000 mi = 1.609 km; 1.000 km = 0.621 mi
