= 2006 New Bedford gay bar shooting and manhunt =

American murderer (1987–2006)

Jacob D. Robida
- Undated mug shot of Robida
- Born: June 13, 1987; Providence, Rhode Island, U.S.
- Died: February 5, 2006 (aged 18); Springfield, Missouri, U.S.
- Cause of death: Suicide by gunshot
- Resting place: Saint Marys Cemetery, New Bedford, Massachusetts
- Education: Dartmouth High School

Details
- Killed: 2
- Injured: 4
- Weapon: 9mm Ruger pistol

Jacob D. Robida (June 13, 1987 – February 5, 2006) was an American Neo-Nazi and murderer. Robida attacked three patrons at a gay bar in New Bedford, Massachusetts, on February 2, 2006, before fleeing by vehicle to Charleston, West Virginia, where he picked up passenger Jennifer Rena Bailey and drove southwest. He was stopped for a traffic violation by Gassville, Arkansas, police officer James W. Sell, whom Robida shot and killed before fleeing east. Robida lost control of his vehicle in Norfork, Arkansas, shortly after running over a spike strip laid by police. He then engaged in a firefight with police, during which he fatally shot Bailey and then himself in the head.

Robida died in a hospital in Springfield, Missouri, on February 5, 2006.

== Background ==
Robida was born on June 13, 1987, in Providence, Rhode Island. He dropped out of Dartmouth High School in December 2003.

== Attack ==
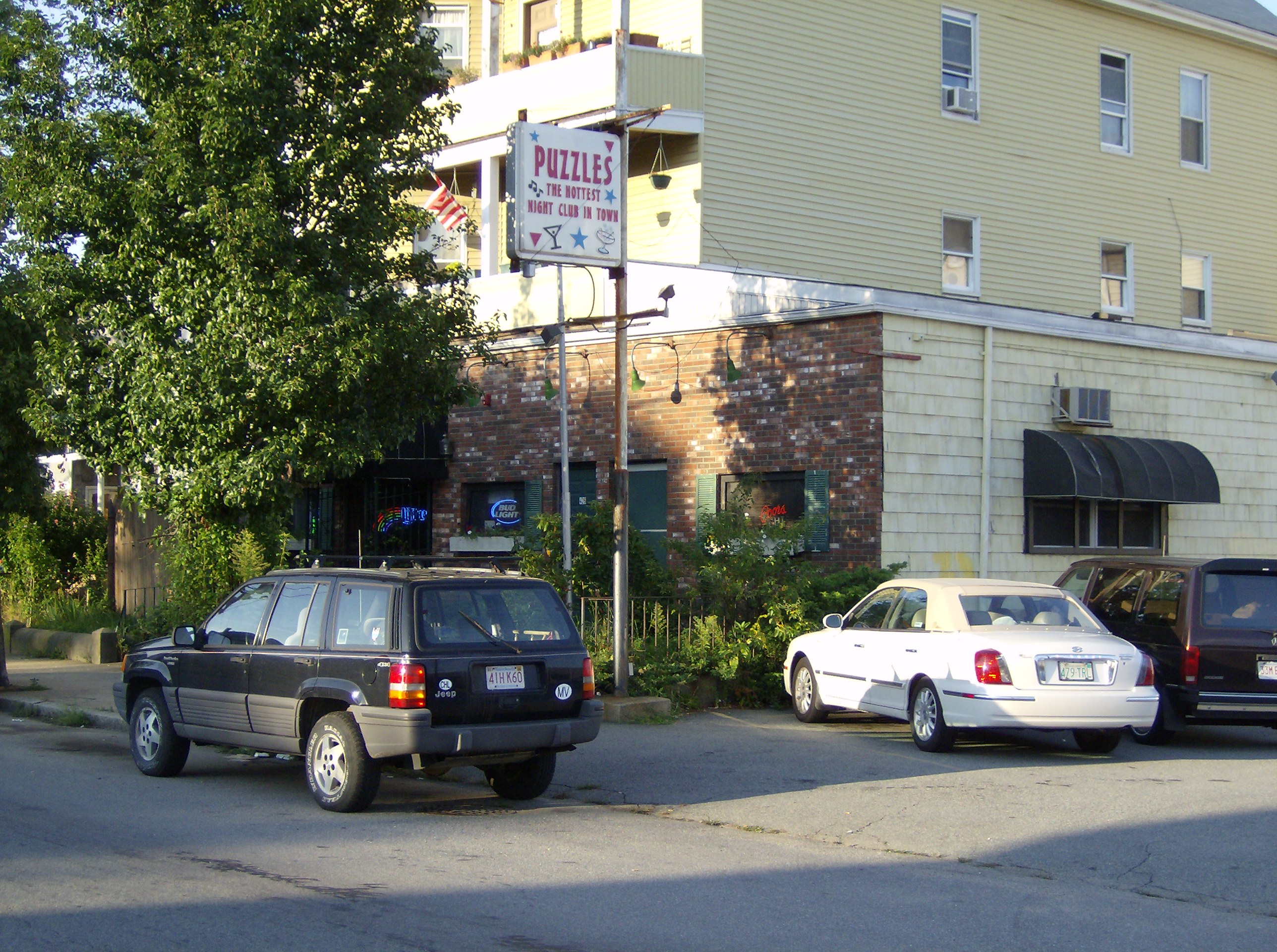
Puzzles Lounge

About midnight on February 2, 2006, Robida entered Puzzles Lounge, a popular gay bar in New Bedford, Massachusetts, 50 miles (80 km) south of Boston. Robida, dressed in black, proceeded to order a drink using a fake ID indicating that he was 23 years old. After he downed his first drink, he asked the bartender if the lounge was a gay bar. The bartender confirmed it was. After a second drink, Robida swung a hatchet at a patron's head, injuring him. Other patrons tackled him and relieved him of the weapon. Robida then opened fire with his handgun and wounded three people. Police treated the incident as a hate crime, and Robida was sought by police for three counts of attempted murder.

Robida fled the scene in a green 1999 Pontiac Grand Am to Charleston, West Virginia, where he was joined by Jennifer Rena Bailey and drove southwest. It has been reported that Robida lived with Bailey in West Virginia in 2004. It is unclear whether Bailey joined him willingly or if she was abducted.

== Manhunt and suicide ==
Police immediately began a manhunt for Robida and raided his mother's home in New Bedford. She told them she had last seen him at 1:00 am, bleeding from the head, and that he had left soon after. They found weapons of all types, including hatchets, knives, handguns, and a shotgun. In his bedroom they found "Nazi regalia" and antisemitic writings on the walls. Fearing he may have left Massachusetts, state police contacted the FBI, sparking a nationwide manhunt. Before long, wanted posters depicting Robida were distributed all over Massachusetts.

In the afternoon of February 4, 2006, Robida's vehicle was seen about 1,500 miles (2,400 km) away in Arkansas, where Jim Sell, a Gassville police officer, initiated a traffic stop at the Brass Door Restaurant parking lot. After talking with Sell for about half a minute, Robida opened fire with a 9mm handgun and fatally shot the officer at least three times. He then got back into his car and drove off but returned shortly after to retrieve his pistol, that he left near Sell's body. Robida turned onto Arkansas Highway 201, headed south, and continued to Arkana, Arkansas, where he fired at Arkansas State Police Sgt. Van Nowlin. Police pursued him and laid spike strips; although these flattened his front tires, they failed to stop the car. Robida fled for about 18 miles down Arkansas Highway 5, where he turned south and drove into the small town of Norfork. In the middle of town he lost control of the car due to the front tires, spun out, and hit two parked vehicles. He then exchanged gunfire with police. During the gunfight, he shot Bailey in the head at point-blank range with a Ruger 9mm semi-automatic pistol, killing her instantly. After Bailey's death, Robida shot himself in the right side of the head. It was initially reported that he was shot twice in the head by police, but an autopsy revealed that he was only shot once in the head, and it was self-inflicted. He was airlifted more than 100 miles to Springfield, Missouri, for medical treatment, where he died of his injuries at the Cox-South hospital the next day at 3:38 am CST, on February 5.

== Responses to the attack ==
At first the mayor of New Bedford, Scott Lang, attributed the attack in part to video games:

This was a hate crime... the actions of a single deranged individual act as a wake up call to our community and once again the nation... This cycle of violence must stop. The guns have to come off the streets. The violent video games have to be taken out of our homes.

Believing the mayor was jumping to conclusions, gamers and members of GamePolitics wrote to Lang, citing that nobody had even mentioned video games as a connection to the mass murders, nor had Robida ever mentioned games on his MySpace weblog. In reply to Andrew Eisen, a member of GamePolitics.com who had written to the mayor over his comments, Lang wrote:

When you get a chance please explain to me the social benefits behind police and military video games for the future of our children.
While I am not familiar with these videos I have seen enough to know they can provide no healthy education for our children. Lastly, there is no doubt in my mind that Mr. Robida played these video games on a regular basis as he was completely obsessed with weapons, violence and destruction. See his my space website for more details. I sincerely appreciate your comments.

However, examination of Robida's MySpace website (archived on GamePolitics) showed a passion for neo-Nazism and Insane Clown Posse, known for its violent and dark lyrics. One song in particular, "Night of the Axe", mentions attacking people with a hatchet, similar to Robida's crime.

On February 7, Insane Clown Posse released a statement on the Robida attacks. The group's manager Alex Abbiss extended members Violent J and Shaggy 2 Dope's condolences and prayers to the families of the victims, stating, "It's quite obvious that this guy had no clue what being a Juggalo is all about. If anyone knows anything at all about ICP, then you know that they have never, ever been down or will be down with any racist or bigotry bullshit."

=== Comments from anti–video game advocate ===
On February 7, 2006, Jack Thompson, a disbarred attorney and activist litigator against violent and sexual video game content, commented on the incident, describing the bar attack as a "killing scenario" from Postal 2 and the killing of Sell as a "suicide by cop homicide" inspired by Grand Theft Auto. Police later dismissed the "suicide by cop" theory when it was discovered that Robida had fatally shot himself.

Thompson claimed to have spoken to a New Bedford detective, who "repeatedly" said Robida's friends had said "he played the Grand Theft Auto games". No further details have emerged, but the following day the Bristol County District Attorney rejected the video game link after examining all the evidence collected from Robida's apartment and car.

My look at the search warrant [for Robida's home] was that the investigators turned up no video games. From the information we have here, there is no proof video games were involved.

== See also ==
- Violence against LGBT people
