= Cotter School District =

School district in Arkansas, United States

Address
- 181 Mable Street Cotter, Arkansas, 72626; United States

District information
- Type: Public
- Grades: PreK–12
- NCES District ID: 0504680

Students and staff
- Students: 778
- Teachers: 85.96
- Staff: 63.0
- Student–teacher ratio: 9.05

Other information
- Website: cotterschools.net

Cotter School District 60 is a school district in Baxter County, Arkansas, headquartered in Cotter. It serves Cotter and Gassville.

Its schools are Cotter Elementary School and Cotter High School.
