= St. Louis-San Francisco Overpass =

Bridge in United States of America

Imboden Bridge
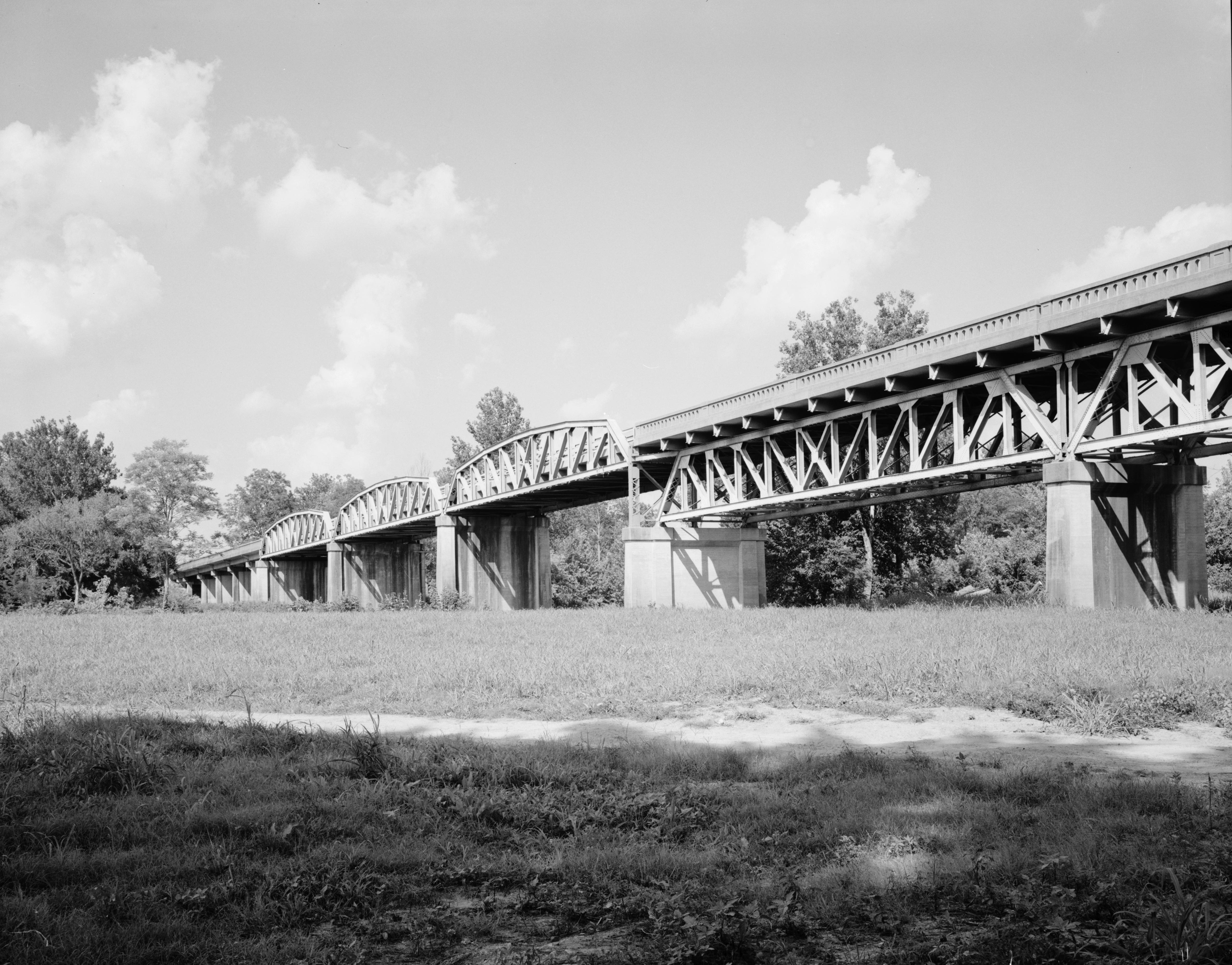
- St. Louis-San Francisco Bridge
- Coordinates: 36°12′21″N 91°10′19″W
- Carries: US 62 / AR 115
- Crosses: Spring River
- Locale: Imboden, Arkansas
- Official name: St. Louis-San Francisco Overpass
- Maintained by: Arkansas Department of Transportation
- ID number: AHTD 1984

Characteristics
- Design: Concrete deck girder approach spans (both sides); three riveted, 11-panel Pratt deck trusses; three riveted, 11-panel Parker pony trusses
- Total length: 1,049.9 feet (320.0 m)
- Width: 2 lanes, 23.9 feet (7.3 m)
- Longest span: 112 feet (34 m)

History
- Opened: 1937

Statistics
- Daily traffic: 2,800
- St. Louis-San Francisco Overpass
- U.S. National Register of Historic Places
- Location within Arkansas Location within the United States
- Nearest city: Imboden, Arkansas
- Area: Lawrence County
- Built: 1937
- Architect: C. F. Lytle
- MPS: Historic Bridges of Arkansas
- NRHP reference No.: 90000513
- Added to NRHP: April 9, 1990

Location
- Interactive map of Imboden Bridge

The St. Louis-San Francisco Overpass is a pony and deck truss bridge built in 1937 in Imboden, Arkansas. It carries U.S. Route 62 and Arkansas Highway 115 over the Spring River and the former St. Louis-San Francisco Railroad ("Frisco", now BNSF) for 1,049.9 feet (320.0 m). The bridge has three Pratt deck trusses, each 112 feet (34 m) in length, and three Parker pony trusses, also 112 feet (34 m) long, with the balance of the bridge length in steel girder truss spans. The bridge is 24 feet (7.3 m) wide.

The bridge was listed on the National Register of Historic Places in 1990. The bridge is currently open to two-lane traffic. It has a separate pedestrian sidewalk.

== See also ==
- List of bridges documented by the Historic American Engineering Record in Arkansas
- List of bridges on the National Register of Historic Places in Arkansas
- National Register of Historic Places listings in Lawrence County, Arkansas
