= Missouri and Northern Arkansas Railroad =

Class III shortline railroad in Missouri

Missouri & Northern Arkansas Railroad

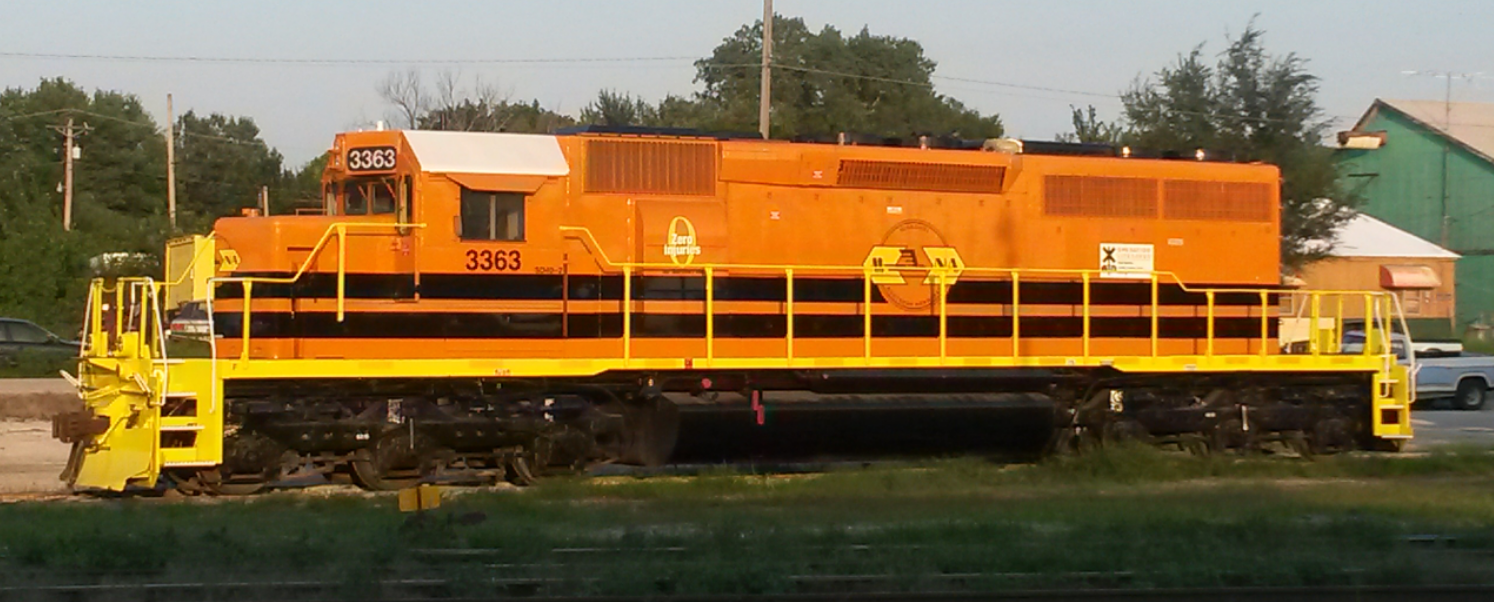
- MNA 3363, an EMD SD40-2 idling at Pearl Yard in Carthage, Missouri.

Overview
- Parent company: Genesee and Wyoming
- Headquarters: Carthage, Missouri
- Reporting mark: MNA
- Locale: Arkansas, Kansas, Missouri
- Dates of operation: 1992–present

Technical
- Track gauge: 4 ft 8 1/2 in (1,435 mm) standard gauge
- Length: 505 miles (813 km)

Other
- Website: https://www.gwrr.com/mna/

The Missouri & Northern Arkansas Railroad, LLC (reporting mark MNA) is a Class II Regional Railroad in the U.S. states of Missouri, Kansas, and Arkansas. The company is headquartered in Carthage, Missouri. It is not to be confused with the Missouri and North Arkansas Railroad which connected Joplin, Missouri, with Helena, Arkansas, from 1906 to 1946.

MNA is owned by Genesee & Wyoming, a shortline railroad holding company, having been purchased in 2013 with the acquisition of RailAmerica who bought the MNA back in 2000.

== Operations ==
MNA operates approximately 505 miles (813 km) of trackage in Arkansas, Kansas, and Missouri. Its mainline extends 384.1 miles (618.1 km) from Pleasant Hill, Missouri, through Carthage, Missouri, to Diaz, Arkansas. It also has trackage rights on Union Pacific Railroad lines for 32 miles (51 km) between Pleasant Hill and Kansas City, Missouri, and 2 miles (3.2 km) between Diaz and Newport, Arkansas. On the mainline, MNA interchanges with the Union Pacific Railroad at Pleasant Hill, Missouri, and Diaz, Arkansas, and with the BNSF Railway at Aurora, Missouri. The line no longer interchanges with the BNSF Railway at Lamar, Missouri, or Carthage, Missouri.

MNA operates a 78.3-mile (126.0 km) secondary line from just east of Fort Scott, Kansas east to Clinton, Missouri. This secondary line interchanges with MNA's Pleasant Hill–Diaz mainline in Nevada, Missouri. It formerly interchanged with BNSF at Fort Scott, Kansas in 1998. Along this track, MNA serves an ADM Bio-Diesel Plant located to the west of Deerfield, Missouri. MNA uses its track between Nevada, MO and Clinton, MO to serve a few customers in Clinton and the now shut down Montrose Generating Station, an Evergy coal-fired power plant near La Due, Missouri .

MNA also operates a 16.7-mile (26.9 km) branch line from Carthage, MO to Joplin, MO that interchanges with MNA's Pleasant Hill–Diaz mainline At Carthage, with the Canadian Pacific Kansas City in Joplin, and with the BNSF in Joplin. A 6-mile (9.7 km) MNA branch line that branches off of the Carthage–Joplin branch line originates from an interchange in Webb City, Missouri and terminates in Atlas, Missouri.

MNA also operates several miles of industrial trackage in the city of Springfield; this segment is disconnected from the rest of the MNA system and traffic is hauled via BNSF to and from the Aurora interchange. Here MNA interchanges with BNSF at Springfield, MO.

Other operated segments are leased from the Union Pacific and BNSF Railroads. MNA has rail yards in Carthage, MO, Nevada, MO, Joplin, MO, Aurora, MO, Cotter, AR, and Batesville, AR.

MNA operates unit coal trains to the Independence Power Plant near Newark, Arkansas.

The Branson Scenic Railway, which runs on track owned by the MNA, operates the "Ozark Zephyr" from Branson, Missouri. Trains operate mostly south into Arkansas but occasionally north to Galena, Missouri, depending on MNA traffic and/or track work. The restored 1906 depot it operates out of is across from Branson Landing in historic downtown Branson.

From 1997 until 2000, the White River Scenic Railroad had operated an excursion train from Flippin, Arkansas to Calico Rock, Arkansas.

Unit grain trains sometimes run from the interchange at Pleasant Hill, MO to the Tyson Foods feed mill at Bergman, AR and back empty.

MNA also runs Union Pacific unit coal trains to unload at the Independence Power Plant in Newark, AR, then hands them back to UP in Newport, AR.

== Genesee & Wyoming Control ==
(All as of 2024): The Missouri & Northern Arkansas Railroad, owned by Genesee & Wyoming, holds 505 total miles, 186 of them in Arkansas, 4 in Kansas and 315 in Missouri. MNA has a maximum capacity of 286,000 gross pounds per railcar. There are a few interchanges as well: BNSF (Aurora, Missouri, Joplin, Missouri, and Springfield, Missouri); Canadian Pacific Kansas City (Joplin, Missouri); Union Pacific (Kansas City, Missouri and Newport, Arkansas).

== History ==
The MNA mainline between Kansas City and Newport originated as the former Missouri Pacific Railroad's White River Line, which was initially chartered in 1883 and was part of the MoPac's mainline between Kansas City and Memphis, Tennessee. The MNA began operations on December 13, 1992, and purchased the 102-mile (164 km) segment from Bergman, Arkansas, to Guion, Arkansas, from MoPac. The secondary line from Fort Scott, Kansas, through Nevada, Missouri, to Clinton, Missouri, was once part of a former Missouri–Kansas–Texas Railroad mainline from Parsons, Kansas, through Sedalia, Missouri, to St. Louis, Missouri. The disused track between Nevada, Missouri, and Fort Scott, Kansas, was an important link between the MNA and BNSF's Fort Scott subdivision; In 1998 it was completely abandoned west of 240th Street just east of Fort Scott.

When Railtex took over operations on the White River Line, they used a handful of older-generation Electro-Motive products including several GP40s, GP35s, GP38s, road slugs, SD40s, and a GP20. After the G&W acquisition in 2012, ten ex-Southern Pacific SD40M-2s were purchased from the Union Pacific to replace the GP40s in road service. In 2018, most of the SD40M-2s were repainted from the UP lightning scheme into the G&W corporate orange.

In late 2022, MNA began phasing out several SD40s, and have replaced them with ex-BNSF General Electric C44-9Ws. Since 2022, approximately 12 C44-9Ws have joined the railroad roster.

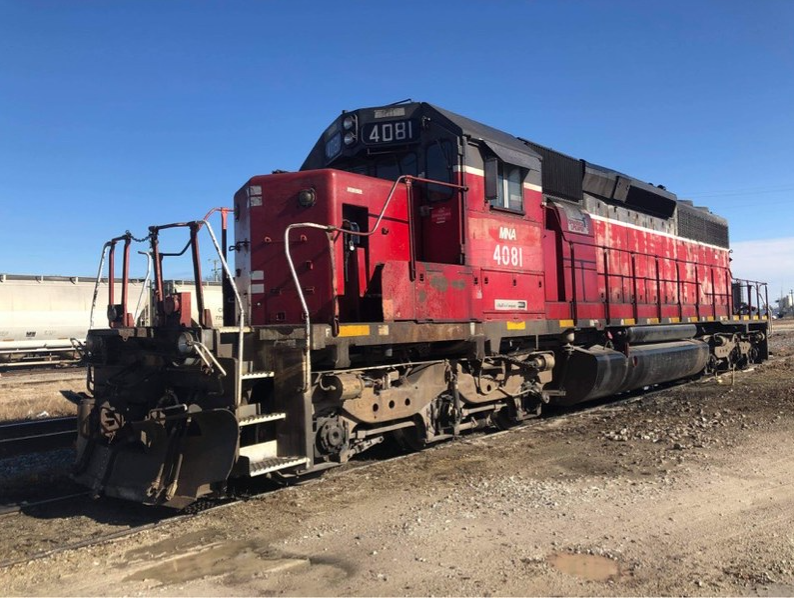
MNA 4081, an EMD SD40-2

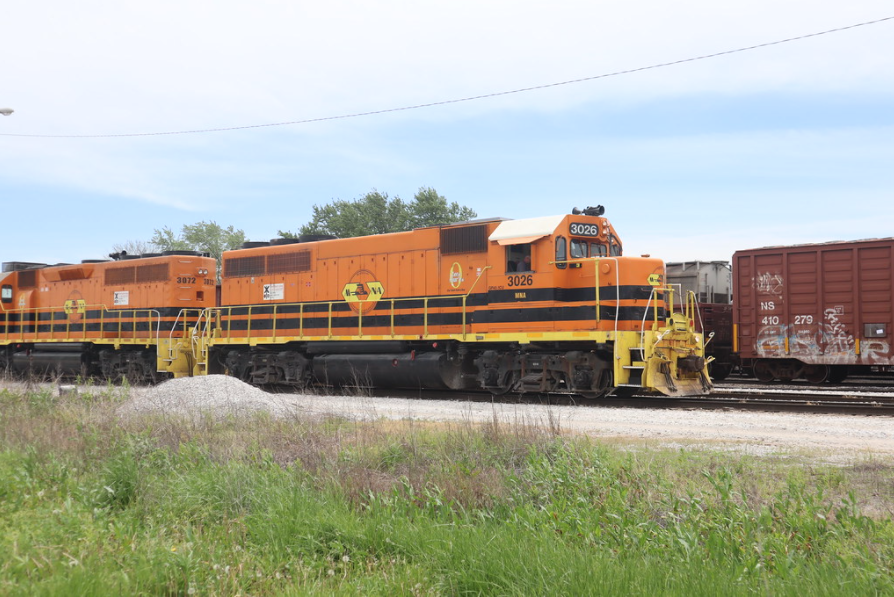
MNA 3026, an EMD GP40
