= Mountain Home High School (Arkansas) =

Mountain Home High School Career Academies

Location
- 500 Bomber Boulevard; Mountain Home, Arkansas 72653; United States
- Coordinates: 36°19′56″N 92°23′51″W

Information
- School district: Mountain Home School District
- CEEB code: 041740
- NCES School ID: 0500004300676
- Faculty: 102.72
- Grades: 10–12
- Enrollment: 1,517 (2023-2024)
- Education system: Career Academies
- Colors: Royal blue and gold
- Athletics conference: 6A West (2020-present)
- Mascot: Bomber
- Team name: Mountain Home Bombers
- Yearbook: The Bomber
- Website: highschool.mhbombers.com/o/mhhs

Mountain Home High School Career Academies is a public secondary school in Mountain Home, Arkansas, United States. It is one of three high schools located in Baxter County and is the sole high school administered by the Mountain Home School District.

Mountain Home High School has received charter school status, granted by the State Board of the Arkansas Department of Education. Mountain Home High School is divided into three career academies: Communications, Arts, and Business (CAB), Architecture, Construction, Manufacturing, and Engineering (ACME), and Health and Human Services (HHS).

== Academics ==
The assumed course of study follows the Smart Core curriculum developed by the Arkansas Department of Education (ADE), which requires 22 units to graduate and is supplemented by the school's career academies model and Advanced Placement courses and exams. The Mountain Home High School is accredited by the ADE and has been accredited by AdvancED since 1955.

=== Career academies ===
Mountain Home High School operates using the academies model. Students are divided into academies based on their interests and learning styles. Each academy consists of core classes (English, History, Math, and Science) and elective classes unique to each academy. Students may choose electives from other academies, but are encouraged to follow a "completer" path within their own academy. Teachers are also split into academies, theoretically according to their strengths.

== Extracurricular activities ==
The Mountain Home High School mascot is the Bomber with blue and gold serving as its school colors.

=== Athletics ===
The Mountain Home Bombers participate in interscholastic activities in the 6A Classification administered by the Arkansas Activities Association. The Bombers compete in the 6A West Conference in sports such as: football, baseball, basketball (boys/girls), bowling (boys/girls), competitive cheer, cross country (boys/girls), competitive dance, golf (boys/girls), soccer (boys/girls), softball, swimming (boys/girls), tennis (boys/girls), track and field (boys/girls), volleyball, and wrestling.

- Volleyball: The Lady Bombers volleyball teams won two consecutive state volleyball championships (1976, 1977).
- Cross Country: The boys cross country team won a state cross country championship in 2000 and 2020. The Lady Bomber teams won three consecutive state championships (2008, 2009, 2010). The teams also completed a sweep of the state championships in 2012 while the girls won another trophy in 2011
- Golf: The boys golf team won a state golf championship title in 2007.
- Basketball: The Bombers boys basketball team won its only state basketball championship in 1966. The Lady Bombers were state champions in 1986.
- Softball: The Lady Bombers won a state fastpitch softball championship in 2008 and 2010.

=== Clubs and traditions ===
The school's FIRST Robotics Competition team, the Baxter Bomb Squad Team #16, is well known, having won the 2012 World Championships and leading the Macy's Thanksgiving Day Parade in 2013.

== Awards and recognition ==
The institution was awarded an American Forest & Paper Association (AF&PA) Recycling Award. During the 2004–05 school year, Mountain Home High School students collected more than 6 tons of paper for recycling, and created a model program to promote natural resource conservation.

The Mountain Home High School Band marched in the Macy's Thanksgiving Day Parade, 2006.

Mountain Home High School, technically the Mountain Home Career Academies, received high honors as being the recipient of the Ford Fund for its efforts in career academies and complete integration of all three core career academies. The ACME and HHS academies were given a national award of distinction for their efforts.

== Notable alumni ==
- Scott Flippo (Class of 1998), member of the Arkansas State Senate for District 17, encompassing Baxter, Boone, and Marion counties.
- Shawn Womack (Class of 1990), state circuit court judge, former member of both houses of the Arkansas General Assembly

== Notable staff ==
- Ryan Mallett, former NFL player
