= Marion County Regional Airport =

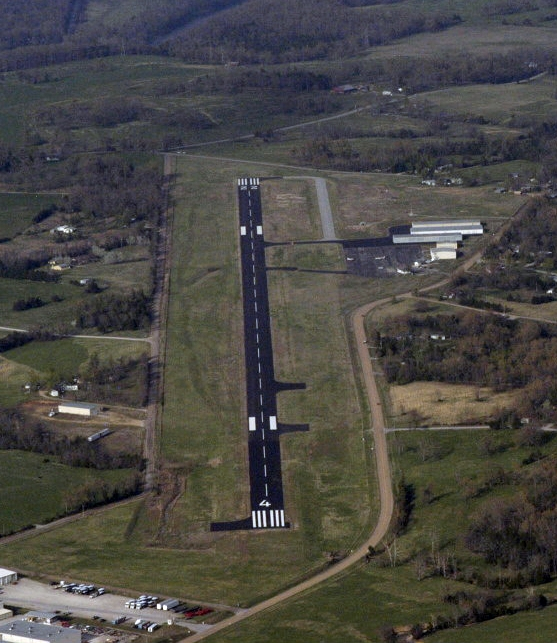
- IATA: FLP; ICAO: KFLP; FAA LID: FLP

Summary
- Airport type: Public
- Owner: Marion County
- Serves: Marion County
- Location: Flippin, Arkansas
- Elevation AMSL: 719 ft / 219 m
- Coordinates: 36°17′27″N 092°35′25″W

Map
- Location of airport in Arkansas FLP (the United States)

Runways
Direction	Length		Surface
Direction	ft	m	Surface
4/22	5,000	1,524	Asphalt

Statistics (2011)
- Aircraft operations: 14,800
- Based aircraft: 23
- Source: Federal Aviation Administration

Marion County Regional Airport (IATA: FLP, ICAO: KFLP, FAA LID: FLP) is a county-owned public-use airport in Marion County, Arkansas, United States. It is located one nautical mile (2 km) north of the central business district of Flippin, Arkansas.

This airport is included in the FAA's National Plan of Integrated Airport Systems for 2011–2015, which categorized it as a general aviation airport.

== Facilities and aircraft ==
Marion County Regional Airport covers an area of 80 acres (32 ha) at an elevation of 719 feet (219 m) above mean sea level. It has one runway designated 4/22 with an asphalt surface measuring 5,000 by 75 feet (1,524 x 23 m).

For the 12-month period ending April 30, 2011, the airport had 14,800 aircraft operations, an average of 40 per day: 92% general aviation, 7% air taxi, and 1% military. At that time there were 23 aircraft based at this airport: 70% single-engine, 26% multi-engine, and 4% ultralight.

== See also ==
- List of airports in Arkansas
