= Henderson, Arkansas =

- Census-designated place
- Location within Arkansas Location within the United States
- Coordinates: 36°22′39″N 92°12′56″W
- Country: United States
- State: Arkansas
- County: Baxter
- Elevation: 676 ft (206 m)

Population (2020)
  - Total: 309
- Time zone: UTC-6 (Central (CST))
  - Summer (DST): UTC-5 (CDT)
- ZIP code: 72544
- Area code: 870
- GNIS feature ID: 2805652

Henderson is an unincorporated community and census-designated place (CDP) in Baxter County, Arkansas, United States. It was first listed as a CDP in the 2020 census with a population of 309. Henderson is located on the east bank of Norfork Lake along U.S. Routes 62 and 412, 9.5 miles (15.3 km) east-northeast of Mountain Home. Henderson has a post office with ZIP code 72544.

== Demographics ==
Historical population
Census	Pop.	Note	%±
2020	309		—
U.S. Decennial Census; 2020

=== 2020 census ===
Henderson CDP, Arkansas – racial and ethnic composition Note: the US Census treats Hispanic/Latino as an ethnic category. This table excludes Latinos from the racial categories and assigns them to a separate category. Hispanics/Latinos may be of any race.
Race / ethnicity (NH = Non-Hispanic)	Pop 2020	% 2020
White alone (NH)	294	95.15%
Black or African American alone (NH)	0	0.00%
Native American or Alaska Native alone (NH)	0	0.00%
Asian alone (NH)	0	0.00%
Pacific Islander alone (NH)	0	0.00%
Some Other Race alone (NH)	1	0.32%
Mixed-race or multi-racial (NH)	12	3.88%
Hispanic or Latino (any race)	2	0.65%
Total	309	100.00%

== Education ==
Almost all of the CDP is in the Mountain Home School District. A small part is in the Viola School District.
