= Buffalo City, Arkansas =

- Census-designated place
- Buffalo City's position in Arkansas. Buffalo City, Arkansas (the United States)
- Coordinates: 36°10′4″N 92°26′32″W
- Country: United States
- State: Arkansas
- County: Baxter
- Township: Buford
- Elevation: 427 ft (130 m)

Population (2020)
  - Total: 26
- Time zone: UTC-6 (Central (CST))
  - Summer (DST): UTC-5 (CDT)
- GNIS feature ID: 2805628

Buffalo City is an unincorporated community and census-designated place (CDP) in Baxter County, Arkansas, United States. It was first listed as a CDP in the 2020 census with a population of 26.

The community is located approximately eleven miles south-southwest of Mountain Home on the north bank of the White River at the southern end of Arkansas Highway 126.

== Demographics ==
Historical population
Census	Pop.	Note	%±
2020	26		—
U.S. Decennial Census; 2020

=== 2020 census ===
Buffalo City CDP, Arkansas – Racial and ethnic composition Note: the US Census treats Hispanic/Latino as an ethnic category. This table excludes Latinos from the racial categories and assigns them to a separate category. Hispanics/Latinos may be of any race.
Race / Ethnicity (NH = Non-Hispanic)	Pop 2020	% 2020
White alone (NH)	22	84.62%
Black or African American alone (NH)	0	0.00%
Native American or Alaska Native alone (NH)	0	0.00%
Asian alone (NH)	2	7.69%
Pacific Islander alone (NH)	0	0.00%
Some Other Race alone (NH)	0	0.00%
Mixed Race or Multi-Racial (NH)	1	3.85%
Hispanic or Latino (any race)	1	3.85%
Total	26	100.00%
