= Bull Shoals-White River State Park =

State park in northern Arkansas, United States

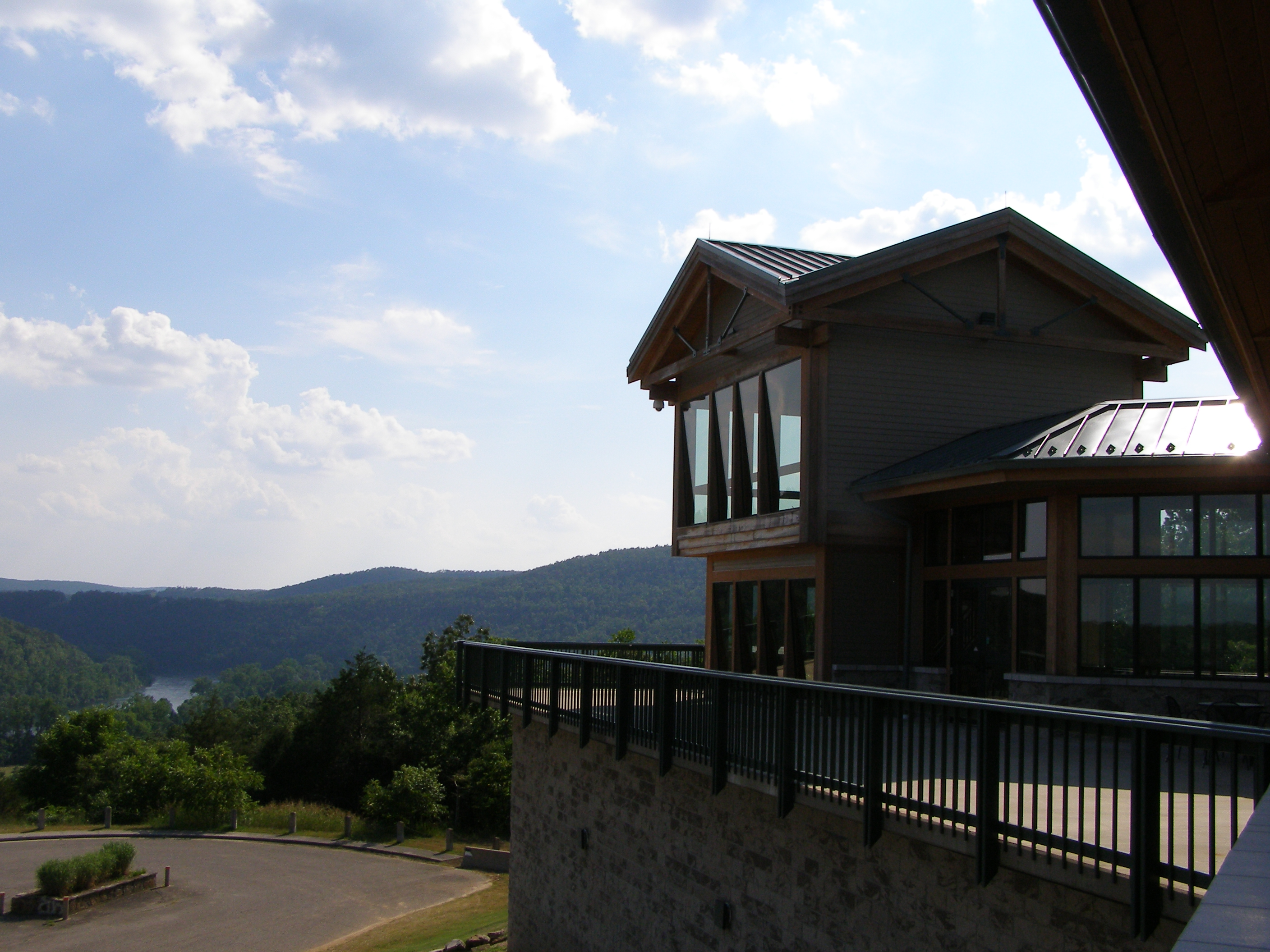

- Location within Arkansas Location within the United States
- Interactive map of Bull Shoals-White River State Park
- Location: Baxter and Marion counties, Arkansas, United States
- Coordinates: 36°22′11″N 92°34′36″W
- Area: 732 acres (296 ha)
- Elevation: 1,375 feet (419 m)
- Established: 1955
- Administrator: Arkansas Department of Parks, Heritage, and Tourism
- Website: Official website
- Arkansas State Parks

Bull Shoals-White River State Park is a 732-acre (296 ha) Arkansas state park in Baxter and Marion Counties, Arkansas in the United States. Containing one of the nation's best trout-fishing streams, the park entered the system in 1955 after the United States Army Corps of Engineers built Bull Shoals Dam on the White River. The park runs along the shoreline of Bull Shoals Lake and the White River above and below the dam, and contains picnic areas, a marina, boat rentals, interpretive programs, and a visitors' center with gift shop.

== History ==
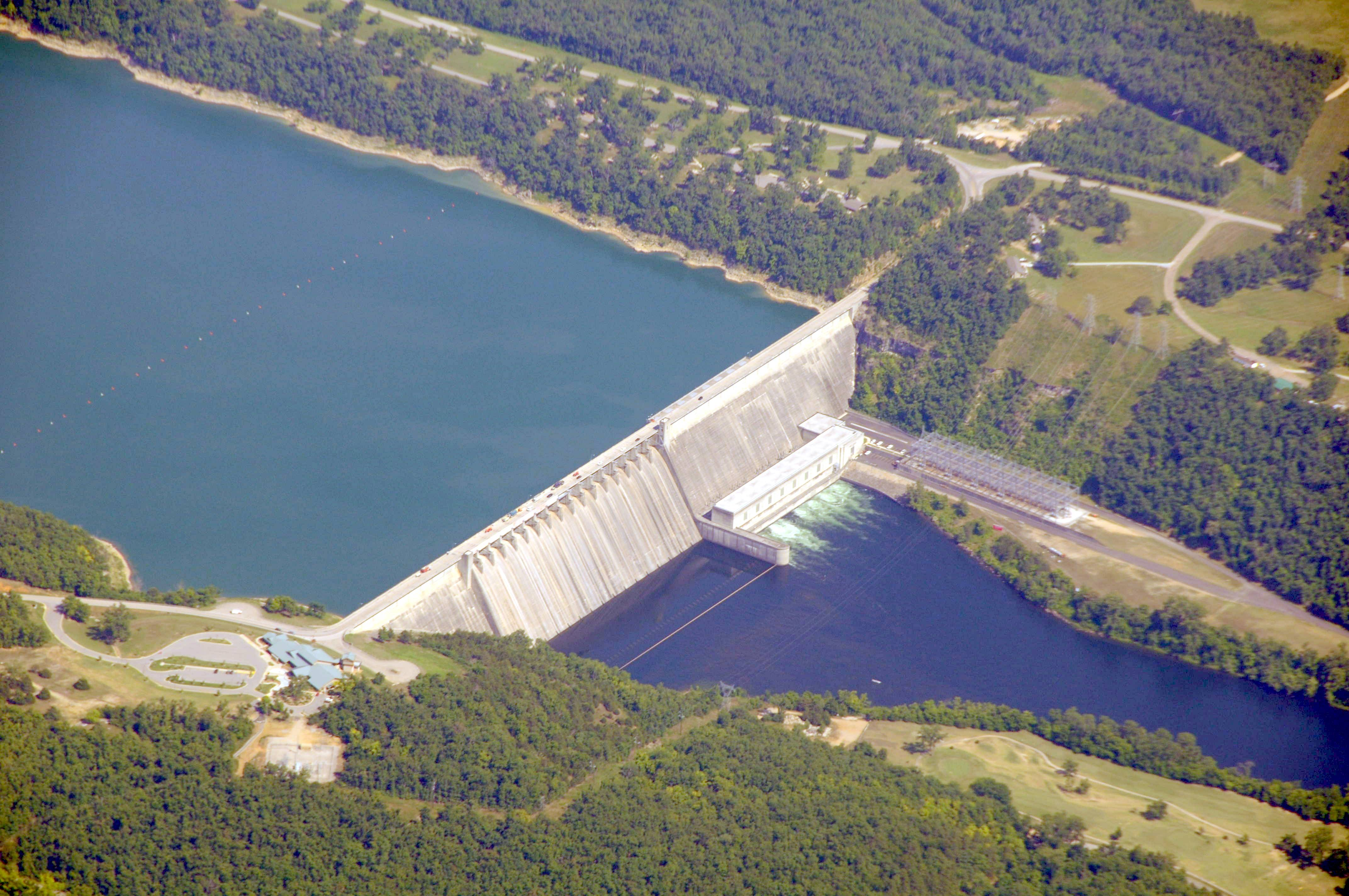
Aerial view of Bull Shoals Dam, with the park visitors' center visible at the bottom of the image.

Initially a flood control and power generation measure, construction on Bull Shoals Dam began in 1947 by the U.S. Army Corps of Engineers. Upon completion in 1951, the Corps rented the shoreline to Arkansas, who used the site as a primitive camping spot with no amenities. The state began to upgrade the services at its parks in 1975, adding a wastewater treatment plant, restrooms, and campsites to the park. The park roads were also paved. A run down lodge, formerly used as an overnight stay for dam workers, was removed in 1979.

== Recreation ==
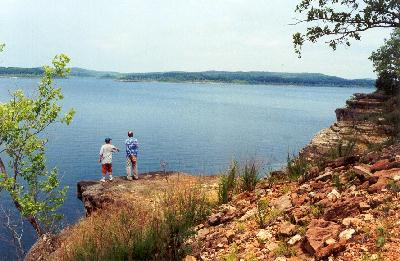
Bull Shoals Lake

The park offers 103 riverside campsites, 30 class AAA, 1 class AA, 4 class A, 48 class B, and 20 tent sites. Two rent-a-camp and two rent-a-RV sites are also available. Picnic areas and pavilions are scattered throughout the park, along with trails through the surrounding woods. A marina contains boating equipment and also rents boats. The visitors' center offers programs, workshops, camps, boating and fishing exhibits.

Bull Shoals Lake is Arkansas's largest lake, and is well known as a trout hot spot. Rainbow trout and brown trout of record size have been caught in the lake, with bream, catfish, crappie and largemouth bass also plentiful. Swimming and other watersports are also welcome at the lake.

== See also ==
- Arkansas Highway 178, highway which runs along the top of Bull Shoals Dam and into the park
