= Lakeview, Arkansas =

- City
- Seal
- Motto: "Paradise of the Ozarks"
- Location of Lakeview in Baxter County, Arkansas.
- Coordinates: 36°22′38″N 92°32′07″W
- Country: United States
- State: Arkansas
- Counties: Baxter

Area
  - Total: 1.04 sq mi (2.69 km^{2})
  - Land: 1.04 sq mi (2.69 km^{2})
  - Water: 0 sq mi (0.00 km^{2})
- Elevation: 787 ft (240 m)

Population (2020)
  - Total: 775
  - Estimate (2025): 783 ▲
  - Density: 745.0/sq mi (287.66/km^{2})
- FIPS code: 05-38050
- GNIS feature ID: 2404876
- Website: cityoflakeviewar.gov

Lakeview is a city in Baxter County, Arkansas, United States. As of the 2020 census, Lakeview had a population of 775.

== Geography ==
According to the United States Census Bureau, the city has a total area of 1.1 square miles (2.8 km^{2}), all land.

The community is located along Arkansas Highway 178.

== Education ==
Lakeview is in the Mountain Home School District. The site of the proposed town was first settled in the mid-1880s and was called Trimble Flat, for the Trimble family, first settlers on the flat fertile plateau overlooking the White River. When the school, Baxter County District No. 25, and the post office were established, they were called Amos. The community, church and cemetery remained Trimble Flat.

== Demographics ==
Historical population
Census	Pop.	Note	%±
1960	103		—
1980	512		—
1990	485		−5.3%
2000	763		57.3%
2010	741		−2.9%
2020	775		4.6%
2025 (est.)	783	▲	1.0%
U.S. Decennial Census

=== 2020 census ===
Lakeview, Arkansas – Racial and ethnic composition Note: the US Census treats Hispanic/Latino as an ethnic category. This table excludes Latinos from the racial categories and assigns them to a separate category. Hispanics/Latinos may be of any race.
Race / Ethnicity (NH = Non-Hispanic)	Pop 2000	Pop 2010	Pop 2020	% 2000	% 2010	2020
White alone (NH)	746	718	723	97.77%	96.90%	93.29%
Black or African American alone (NH)	0	0	0	0.00%	0.00%	0.00%
Native American or Alaska Native alone (NH)	3	2	9	0.39%	0.27%	1.16%
Asian alone (NH)	4	4	4	0.52%	0.54%	0.52%
Pacific Islander alone (NH)	0	0	0	0.00%	0.00%	0.00%
Some Other Race alone (NH)	0	0	1	0.00%	0.00%	0.13%
Mixed Race or Multi-Racial (NH)	0	6	25	0.00%	0.81%	3.23%
Hispanic or Latino (any race)	10	11	13	1.31%	1.48%	1.68%
Total	763	741	775	100.00%	100.00%	100.00%

As of the census of 2010, there were 883 people, 402 households, and 282 families residing in the city. The population density was 664.4 inhabitants per square mile (256.5/km^{2}). There were 426 housing units at an average density of 371.0 per square mile (143.2/km^{2}). The racial makeup of the city was 98.95% White, 0.39% Native American, 0.52% Asian, 0.13% from other races. 1.31% of the population were Hispanic or Latino of any race.

There were 372 households, out of which 14.0% had children under the age of 18 living with them, 64.2% were married couples living together, 2.2% had a female householder with no husband present, and 32.0% were non-families. 28.2% of all households were made up of individuals, and 15.9% had someone living alone who was 65 years of age or older. The average household size was 2.05 and the average family size was 2.45.

In the city, the population was spread out, with 13.6% under the age of 18, 3.5% from 18 to 24, 14.3% from 25 to 44, 30.4% from 45 to 64, and 38.1% who were 65 years of age or older. The median age was 60 years. For every 100 females, there were 102.9 males. For every 100 females age 18 and over, there were 101.5 males.

The median income for a household in the city was $31,667, and the median income for a family was $38,482. Males had a median income of $27,750 versus $25,313 for females. The per capita income for the city was $16,667. About 7.9% of families and 12.1% of the population were below the poverty line, including 19.6% of those under age 18 and 4.1% of those age 65 or over.

== See also ==
- Lake View, Arkansas
