= The Baxter Bulletin =

Newspaper in Mountain Home, Arkansas

- Type: Twice-weekly newspaper
- Format: Broadsheet
- Owner: Carpenter Media Group
- Founded: 1901
- Headquarters: 16 West 6th Street; Mountain Home, Arkansas 72653 United States
- Circulation: 8,878
- ISSN: 0745-7707
- OCLC number: 1058046191
- Website: baxterbulletin.com

The Baxter Bulletin is a twice-weekly newspaper serving Mountain Home, Arkansas and Baxter County, Arkansas, and surrounding areas.

== History ==
The Baxter Bulletin was sold to Multimedia in 1976 and Gannett acquired Multimedia in 1995. In August 2021, Gannett sold the newspaper to Phillips Media Group.

In January 2024, the newspaper announced it will reduce its print frequency from five days a week to two (Wednesdays and Saturdays). In August 2024, Phillips Media Group sold the paper to Carpenter Media Group.
