= Flippin, Arkansas =

- City
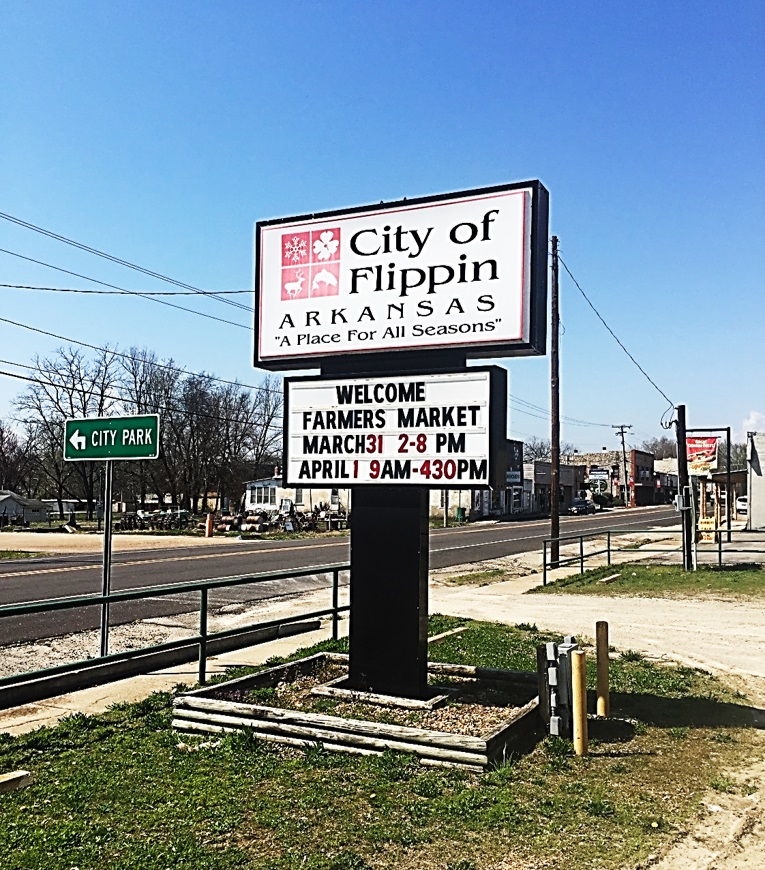
- Sign in front of Flippin city hall

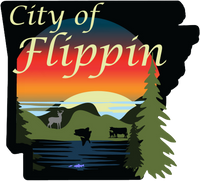
- Seal
- Motto: "Flippin Awesome!"
- Location in Marion County, Arkansas
- Coordinates: 36°16′38″N 92°35′37″W
- Country: United States
- State: Arkansas
- County: Marion

Area
  - Total: 1.88 sq mi (4.88 km^{2})
  - Land: 1.88 sq mi (4.88 km^{2})
  - Water: 0 sq mi (0.00 km^{2})
- Elevation: 633 ft (193 m)

Population (2020)
  - Total: 1,345
  - Estimate (2025): 1,290 ▼
  - Density: 714.3/sq mi (275.78/km^{2})
- Time zone: UTC-6 (Central (CST))
  - Summer (DST): UTC-5 (CDT)
- ZIP code: 72634
- Area code: 870
- FIPS code: 05-24010
- GNIS feature ID: 2403618
- Website: www.cityofflippin.gov

Flippin is a city in Marion County, Arkansas, United States. The population was 1,345 at the 2020 census.

The city was named for the Thomas H. Flippin family and was incorporated in 1921. The Thomas H. Flippin Chapter of the Arkansas State Society, National Society United States Daughters of 1812, was named for the military service of SGT Thomas H.Flippin of Captain Hugh Brown’s Company, 1st Regiment, Kentucky Mounted Militia during the War of 1812.

== Geography ==
Flippin is located in eastern Marion County north of US 412/62, in the Ozarks south of Bull Shoals Lake. The town lies 3 miles (5 km) west of the White River. US 412/62 leads southwest 7 miles (11 km) to Yellville, the Marion county seat, and northeast 14 miles (23 km) to Mountain Home.

According to the United States Census Bureau, the city of Flippin has a total area of 1.9 square miles (4.9 km^{2}), all land.

=== Climate ===
The climate in this area is characterized by hot, humid summers and generally mild to cool winters. According to the Trewartha climate classification system, Flippin has a humid subtropical climate, in the Köppen Climate Classification ,"Cfa".

== Demographics ==
Historical population
Census	Pop.	Note	%±
1930	325		—
1940	332		2.2%
1950	646		94.6%
1960	433		−33.0%
1970	626		44.6%
1980	1,072		71.2%
1990	1,006		−6.2%
2000	1,357		34.9%
2010	1,355		−0.1%
2020	1,345		−0.7%
2025 (est.)	1,290	▼	−4.1%
U.S. Decennial Census

=== 2020 census ===
As of the 2020 census, Flippin had a population of 1,345. The median age was 40.1 years. 23.0% of residents were under the age of 18 and 18.5% of residents were 65 years of age or older. For every 100 females there were 90.2 males, and for every 100 females age 18 and over there were 86.2 males age 18 and over.

0.0% of residents lived in urban areas, while 100.0% lived in rural areas.

There were 587 households in Flippin, of which 27.6% had children under the age of 18 living in them. Of all households, 34.9% were married-couple households, 19.1% were households with a male householder and no spouse or partner present, and 35.1% were households with a female householder and no spouse or partner present. About 37.1% of all households were made up of individuals and 18.6% had someone living alone who was 65 years of age or older.

There were 669 housing units, of which 12.3% were vacant. The homeowner vacancy rate was 1.4% and the rental vacancy rate was 9.4%.

Flippin racial composition
Race	Number	Percentage
White (non-Hispanic)	1,224	91.0%
Black or African American (non-Hispanic)	1	0.07%
Native American	15	1.12%
Asian	4	0.3%
Other/Mixed	60	4.46%
Hispanic or Latino	41	3.05%

=== 2000 census ===
As of the census of 2000, there were 1,357 people, 583 households, and 357 families residing in the city. The population density was 755.7 inhabitants per square mile (291.8/km^{2}). There were 644 housing units at an average density of 358.7 per square mile (138.5/km^{2}). The racial makeup of the city was 95.87% White, 0.44% Black or African American, 1.11% Native American, 0.29% Asian, 0.07% from other races, and 2.21% from two or more races. 0.81% of the population were Hispanic or Latino of any race.

There were 583 households, out of which 29.2% had children under the age of 18 living with them, 44.3% were married couples living together, 14.2% had a female householder with no husband present, and 38.6% were non-families. 33.4% of all households were made up of individuals, and 16.1% had someone living alone who was 65 years of age or older. The average household size was 2.33 and the average family size was 2.99.

In the city, the population was spread out, with 27.9% under the age of 18, 8.7% from 18 to 24, 27.6% from 25 to 44, 20.0% from 45 to 64, and 15.8% who were 65 years of age or older. The median age was 35 years. For every 100 females, there were 85.4 males. For every 100 females age 18 and over, there were 74.5 males.

== Economy ==
Located close to the White River, tourism plays a vital role in the Flippin economy with several resorts that feature trout fishing and lodging on the river. Ranger Boats was founded in and continues to operate out of Flippin.

== Education ==
Public education for elementary and secondary school students is provided by the Flippin School District and its three schools including Flippin High School.

== Infrastructure ==
=== Highways ===
- US 62/US 412
- U.S. Route 62 Business
- Highway 178
- Highway 202
- Airport Highway 980

== Notable people ==
- Trevor Rainbolt, American GeoGuessr YouTuber
- Forrest L. Wood, American entrepreneur

== See also ==
- Flippin, Kentucky
