= Gassville, Arkansas =

- City
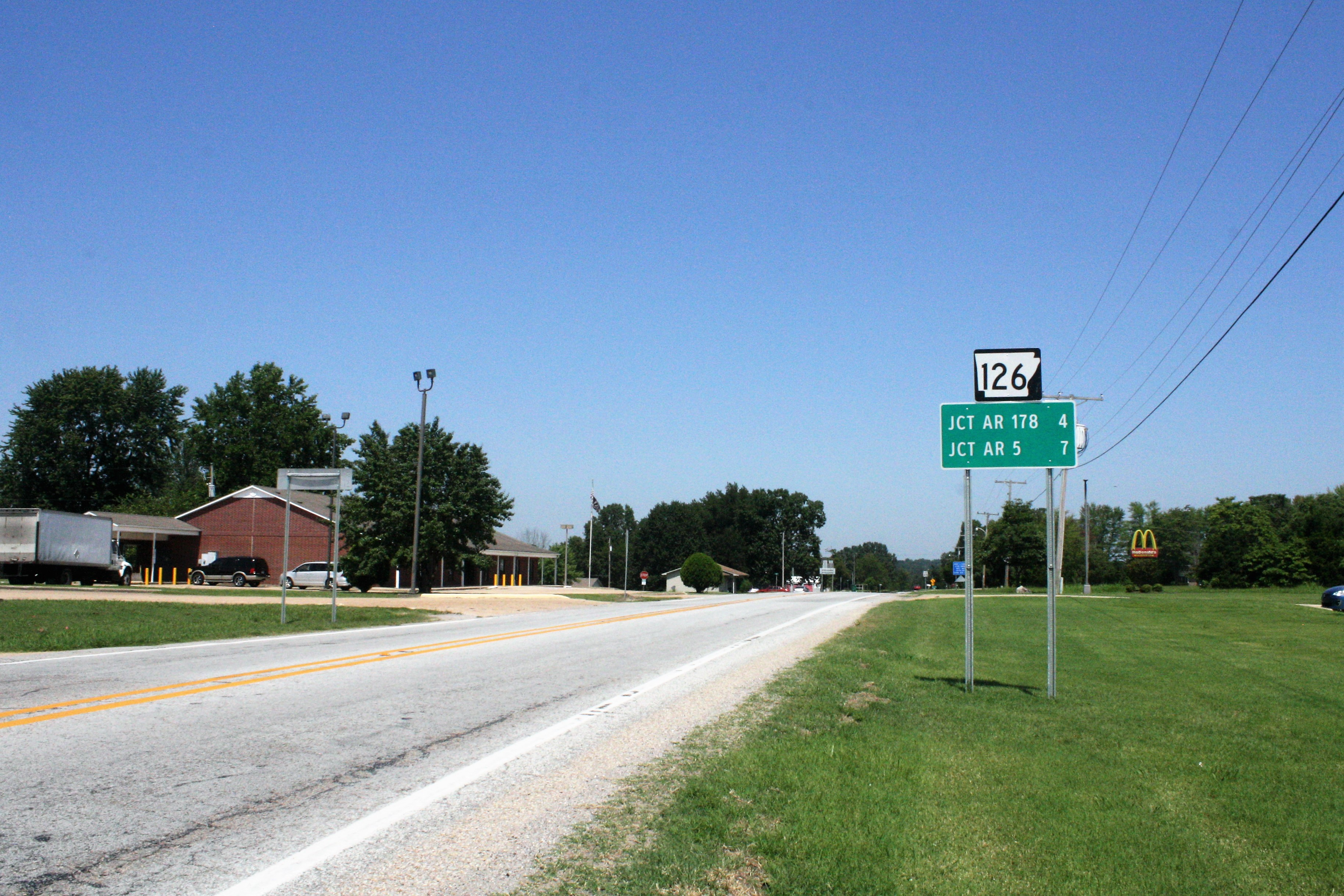
- Arkansas Highway 126 in Gassville

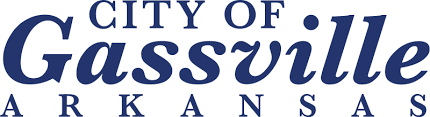

- Location of Gassville in Baxter County, Arkansas.
- Coordinates: 36°16′59″N 92°29′24″W
- Country: United States
- State: Arkansas
- County: Baxter
- Incorporated: January 20, 1903
- Named for: P. A. Cox, town founder and a talkative man nicknamed a "gasser"

Government
  - Type: Mayor-city council

Area
  - Total: 3.43 sq mi (8.89 km^{2})
  - Land: 3.43 sq mi (8.89 km^{2})
  - Water: 0 sq mi (0.00 km^{2})
- Elevation: 742 ft (226 m)

Population (2020)
  - Total: 2,171
  - Estimate (2025): 2,205 ▲
  - Density: 632.8/sq mi (244.32/km^{2})
- Time zone: UTC-6 (Central (CST))
  - Summer (DST): UTC-5 (CDT)
- ZIP code: 72635
- Area code: 870
- FIPS code: 05-26050
- GNIS feature ID: 2403683
- Website: www.cityofgassville.gov

Gassville (formerly Mount Pleasant and Turkey's Neck) is a city in Baxter County, Arkansas, United States. According to the 2020 census, the city population was 2,171.

== Geography ==
Gassville is located at 36°16′59″N 92°29′24″W (36.283160, -92.490124).

According to the United States Census Bureau, the city has a total area of 3.4 square miles (8.8 km^{2}), all land.

=== Major highways ===
- US 62/US 412
- Arkansas Highway 126
- Arkansas Highway 345

== Education ==
Almost all of Gassville is within the Cotter School District, and students attend Cotter High School to graduate from public schooling.

A small part is within the Mountain Home School District.

== Demographics ==
Historical population
Census	Pop.	Note	%±
1910	198		—
1920	191		−3.5%
1930	227		18.8%
1940	228		0.4%
1950	273		19.7%
1960	233		−14.7%
1970	434		86.3%
1980	859		97.9%
1990	1,167		35.9%
2000	1,706		46.2%
2010	2,078		21.8%
2020	2,171		4.5%
2025 (est.)	2,205	▲	1.6%
U.S. Decennial Census; 2014 Estimate

=== 2020 census ===
As of the 2020 census, Gassville had a population of 2,171. The median age was 38.0 years. 25.9% of residents were under the age of 18 and 19.5% of residents were 65 years of age or older. For every 100 females, there were 89.8 males, and for every 100 females age 18 and over there were 82.1 males age 18 and over.

78.3% of residents lived in urban areas, while 21.7% lived in rural areas.

There were 847 households in Gassville, and there were 627 families residing in the city. Of those households, 36.6% had children under the age of 18 living in them. Of all households, 43.3% were married-couple households, 18.7% were households with a male householder and no spouse or partner present, and 32.2% were households with a female householder and no spouse or partner present. About 31.0% of all households were made up of individuals and 14.2% had someone living alone who was 65 years of age or older.

There were 931 housing units, of which 9.0% were vacant. The homeowner vacancy rate was 1.8% and the rental vacancy rate was 7.9%.

Gassville racial composition
Race	Number	Percentage
White (non-Hispanic)	1,911	88.02%
Black or African American (non-Hispanic)	5	0.23%
Native American	10	0.46%
Asian	7	0.32%
Other/Mixed	170	7.83%
Hispanic or Latino	68	3.13%

=== 2010 census ===
As of the census of 2010, there were 2,158 people, 688 households, and 502 families residing in the city. The population density was 508.1 inhabitants per square mile (196.2/km^{2}). There were 712 housing units at an average density of 208.3 per square mile (80.4/km^{2}). The racial makeup of the city was 97.83% White, 0.18% Black or African American, 0.41% Native American, 0.29% Asian, 0.06% Pacific Islander, 0.35% from other races, and 0.88% from two or more races. 1.17% of the population were Hispanic or Latino of any race.

There were 653 households, out of which 34.5% had children under the age of 18 living with them, 56.0% were married couples living together, 12.7% had a female householder with no husband present, and 27.4% were non-families. 23.9% of all households were made up of individuals, and 11.3% had someone living alone who was 65 years of age or older. The average household size was 2.45 and the average family size was 2.89.

In the city, the population was spread out, with 26.8% under the age of 18, 6.8% from 18 to 24, 27.5% from 25 to 44, 20.2% from 45 to 64, and 18.6% who were 65 years of age or older. The median age was 37 years. For every 100 females, there were 84.8 males. For every 100 females age 18 and over, there were 78.5 males.

The median income for a household in the city was $25,478, and the median income for a family was $30,481. Males had a median income of $22,955 versus $17,267 for females. The per capita income for the city was $12,221. About 11.7% of families and 18.9% of the population were below the poverty line, including 25.4% of those under age 18 and 14.0% of those age 65 or over.

== Notable events ==
On February 4, 2006, Gassville police officer Jim Sell was fatally shot when attempting to apprehend Jacob D. Robida, a fugitive wanted in connection with a Massachusetts hate crime.

On February 5, 2008, Gassville was devastated by a tornado. The town was sealed off, due to the possibility of gas leaks causing an explosion.

== See also ==
- Arkansas Highway 345 (1969–2020), former state highway in Gassville
