= Baxter County Airport =

Baxter County Airport Baxter County Airport

- IATA: WMH; ICAO: KBPK; FAA LID: BPK

Summary
- Airport type: Public
- Operator: Baxter County Airport Authority
- Location: Mountain Home, Arkansas
- Elevation AMSL: 928 ft (283 m)
- Coordinates: 36°22′08″N 092°28′14″W

Map
- Location of airport in Arkansas BPK (the United States)

Runways
Direction	Length		Surface
Direction	ft	m	Surface
5/23	5,000	1,524	Asphalt

Statistics (2024)
- Aircraft operations: 11,500
- Based aircraft: 74
- Source: Federal Aviation Administration

Baxter County Airport (IATA: WMH, ICAO: KBPK, FAA LID: BPK), is a county-owned public-use airport located four nautical miles (5 mi, 7 km) northwest of the central business district of Mountain Home, a city in Baxter County, Arkansas, United States. It was known as Baxter County Airport until 2005, when it was renamed to Ozark Regional Airport. It changed its name back to Baxter County Airport due to confusion with the close proximity of Ozark, Arkansas and Ozark, Missouri, both of which have airports. The airport used to be served by Lone Star Airlines, which operated services to Dallas-Fort Worth International in the mid-1990s.

This airport is included in the National Plan of Integrated Airport Systems for 2011–2015, which categorized it as a general aviation facility.

Although most U.S. airports use the same three-letter location identifier for the FAA and IATA, Baxter County Airport is assigned BPK by the FAA and WMH by the IATA. The airport's ICAO identifier is KBPK.

== Facilities and aircraft ==
The airport covers an area of 346 acres (140 ha) at an elevation of 928 feet (283 m) above mean sea level. It has one runway designated 5/23 with an asphalt surface measuring 5,000 by 75 feet (1,524 x 23 m).

For the 12-month period ending July 31, 2020, the airport had 11,500 aircraft operations, an average of 32 per day: 91% general aviation, 6% military, and 3% air taxi. At that time there were 74 aircraft based at this airport: 70% single-engine, 15% multi-engine, and 15% jet.

As of November 2015, Big Air is the onsite FBO providing fuel and services for pilots and crew. Full service 100LL and Jet-A fuel is provided. Big Air is located on the airports main ramp between Delta and Echo.

== See also ==
- List of airports in Arkansas
