= National Register of Historic Places listings in Fulton County, Arkansas =

Location of Fulton County in Arkansas

This is a list of the National Register of Historic Places listings in Fulton County, Arkansas.

This is intended to be a complete list of the properties on the National Register of Historic Places in Fulton County, Arkansas, United States. The locations of National Register properties for which the latitude and longitude coordinates are included below, may be seen in a map.

There are 10 properties listed on the National Register in the county, and one former listing.

Contents: Counties in Arkansas
- Arkansas
- Ashley
- Baxter
- Benton
- Boone
- Bradley
- Calhoun
- Carroll
- Chicot
- Clark
- Clay
- Cleburne
- Cleveland
- Columbia
- Conway
- Craighead
- Crawford
- Crittenden
- Cross
- Dallas
- Desha
- Drew
- Faulkner
- Franklin
- Fulton
- Garland
- Grant
- Greene
- Hempstead
- Hot Spring
- Howard
- Independence
- Izard
- Jackson
- Jefferson
- Johnson
- Lafayette
- Lawrence
- Lee
- Lincoln
- Little River
- Logan
- Lonoke
- Madison
- Marion
- Miller
- Mississippi
- Monroe
- Montgomery
- Nevada
- Newton
- Ouachita
- Perry
- Phillips
- Pike
- Poinsett
- Polk
- Pope
- Prairie
- Pulaski (Little Rock)
- Randolph
- St. Francis
- Saline
- Scott
- Searcy
- Sebastian
- Sevier
- Sharp
- Stone
- Union
- Van Buren
- Washington
- White
- Woodruff
- Yell

This National Park Service list is complete through NPS recent listings posted December 19, 2025.

== Current listings ==
	Name on the Register	Image	Date listed	Location	City or town	Description
1	Camp Methodist Church	Camp Methodist Church	May 9, 1997 (#97000402)	Highway 9, approximately 6 miles east of Salem; 36°24′44″N 91°44′16″W	Camp	
2	Castleberry Building		March 16, 2021 (#100006023)	102 South Main St. 36°22′15″N 91°49′22″W	Salem	
3	County Line School and Lodge	County Line School and Lodge	March 27, 1975 (#75000386)	Northwest of Gepp on the eastern side of the Baxter-Fulton county line, 2 miles south of the state line 36°29′13″N 92°09′00″W	Gepp	
4	Green Valley Homestead		January 26, 2018 (#100001994)	2605 Sturkie Rd. 36°24′20″N 91°50′37″W	Salem vicinity	
5	Kansas City, Fort Scott and Memphis Railroad Depot	Kansas City, Fort Scott and Memphis Railroad Depot	June 11, 1992 (#92000617)	Southeast of the BNSF railroad tracks on an access road for Mammoth Spring State Park; 36°29′45″N 91°31′54″W	Mammoth Spring	
6	Mammoth Spring Dam and Lake	Mammoth Spring Dam and Lake	July 15, 2009 (#09000512)	17 U.S. Route 63, N. 36°29′43″N 91°32′11″W	Mammoth Spring	
7	T.H. Morris House	T.H. Morris House	September 13, 1990 (#90001462)	Junction of 6th and Bethel Sts. 36°29′41″N 91°32′37″W	Mammoth Spring	
8	Saddle Store	Saddle Store	November 15, 2000 (#00001366)	Highway 289; 36°21′19″N 91°38′14″W	Saddle	
9	Saint Andrew's Episcopal Church	Saint Andrew's Episcopal Church	November 26, 1986 (#86002944)	Highway 9; 36°29′42″N 91°31′58″W	Mammoth Spring	
10	Spring River Bridge	Spring River Bridge	January 22, 2014 (#13001104)	Riverview Dr. over Spring River; 36°28′38″N 91°31′29″W	Mammoth Spring	

== Former listings ==
	Name on the Register	Image	Date listed	Date removed	Location	City or town	Description
1	AR 289 Bridge Over English Creek	AR 289 Bridge Over English Creek	January 22, 2009 (#08001338)	September 1, 2022	Highway 289 over English Creek; 36°26′48″N 91°34′01″W	Mammoth Spring	

== See also ==
- List of National Historic Landmarks in Arkansas
- National Register of Historic Places listings in Arkansas
