= Salem School District (Arkansas) =

School district in Arkansas, United States

Address
- 313 Highway 62 East Salem, Arkansas, 72576; United States

District information
- Type: Public
- Grades: K–12
- NCES District ID: 0512090

Students and staff
- Students: 850
- Teachers: 76.7
- Staff: 54.68
- Student–teacher ratio: 11.08

Other information
- Website: www.salemschools.net

Salem School District is a public school district based in Salem, Fulton County, Arkansas, United States. The district serves around 850 students by employing more than 130 faculty and staff serving its two schools and district offices.

The school district encompasses 226.44 square miles (586.5 km^{2}) of land serving all or portions of Mammoth Spring, Sturkie, Viola, Glencoe, Ash Flat, Horseshoe Bend, and Camp.

== Schools ==
- Salem High School, serving grades 7 through 12.
- Salem Elementary School, serving kindergarten through grade 6.
