= Many Islands, Arkansas =

- Unincorporated community
- Location within Arkansas Location within the United States
- Coordinates: 36°23′20″N 91°31′46″W
- Country: United States
- State: Arkansas
- County: Fulton
- Elevation: 430 ft (130 m)
- Time zone: UTC-6 (Central (CST))
  - Summer (DST): UTC-5 (CDT)
- Area code: 870
- GNIS feature ID: 51652

Many Islands is an unincorporated community in eastern Fulton County, Arkansas, United States. Many Islands is located along the Spring River, 7.4 miles (11.9 km) south of Mammoth Spring.
