= Spring River Bridge =

- U.S. National Register of Historic Places
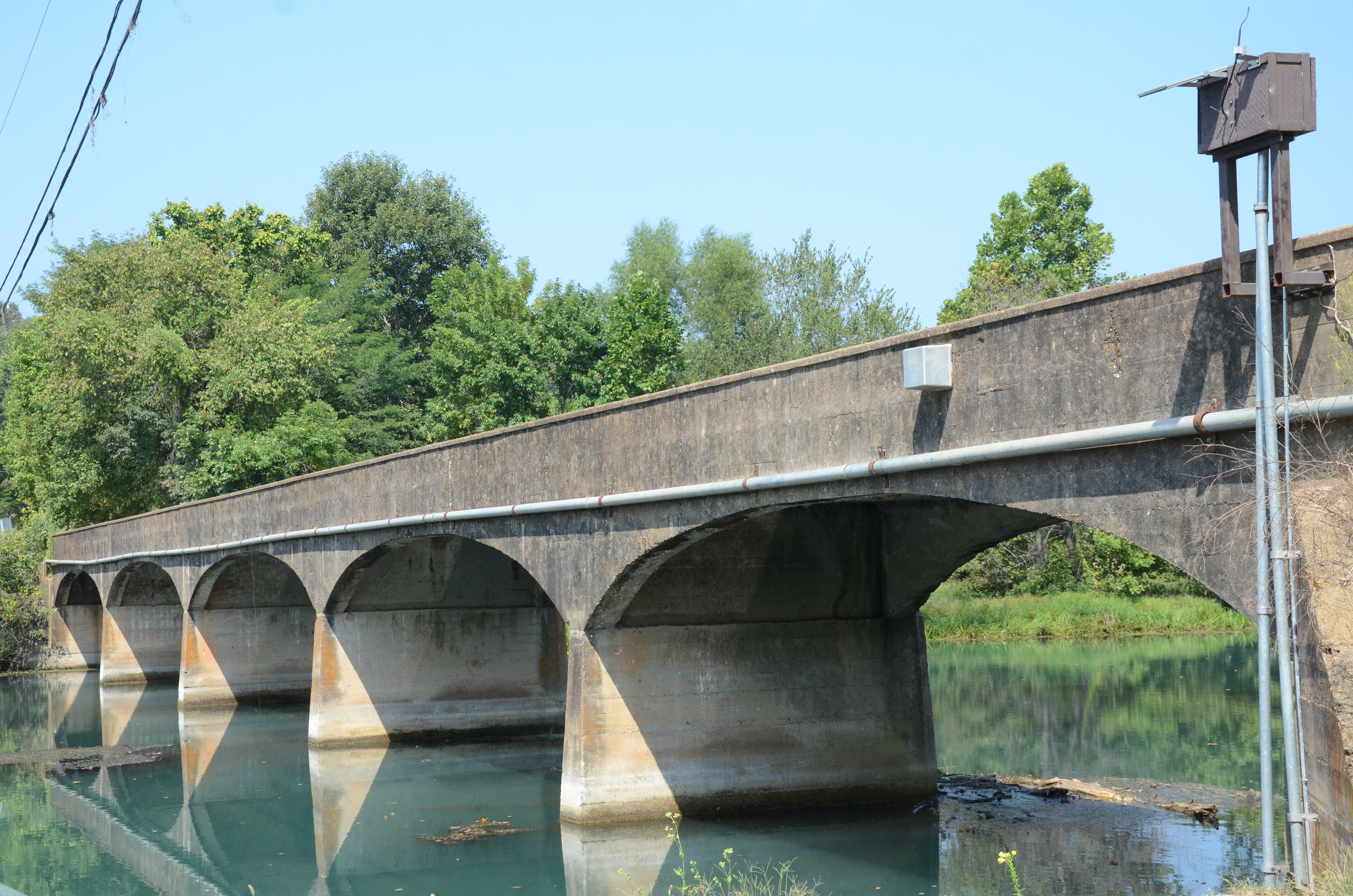

- Location within Arkansas Location within the United States
- Nearest city: Mammoth Spring, Arkansas
- Coordinates: 36°28′38″N 91°31′28″W
- Area: less than one acre
- Built: 1916
- Built by: H.B. Walton
- Architectural style: Concrete girder
- MPS: Historic Bridges of Arkansas MPS
- NRHP reference No.: 13001104
- Added to NRHP: January 22, 2014

The Spring River Bridge, is a historic bridge carrying Riverview Drive over the Spring River south of Mammoth Spring, Arkansas. The bridge is a concrete girder structure with five spans, and a total length of 222 feet (68 m). The bridge is about 10 feet (3.0 m) wide, with simple cast concrete guard rails. The bridge rests on concrete abutments and piers. The bridge was built in 1916 by H. B. Walton as part of a county effort to improve its road infrastructure and is a well-preserved local example of early concrete bridge construction.

The bridge was listed on the National Register of Historic Places in 2014.

== See also ==
- National Register of Historic Places listings in Fulton County, Arkansas
- List of bridges on the National Register of Historic Places in Arkansas
