= County Line School and Lodge =

- U.S. National Register of Historic Places
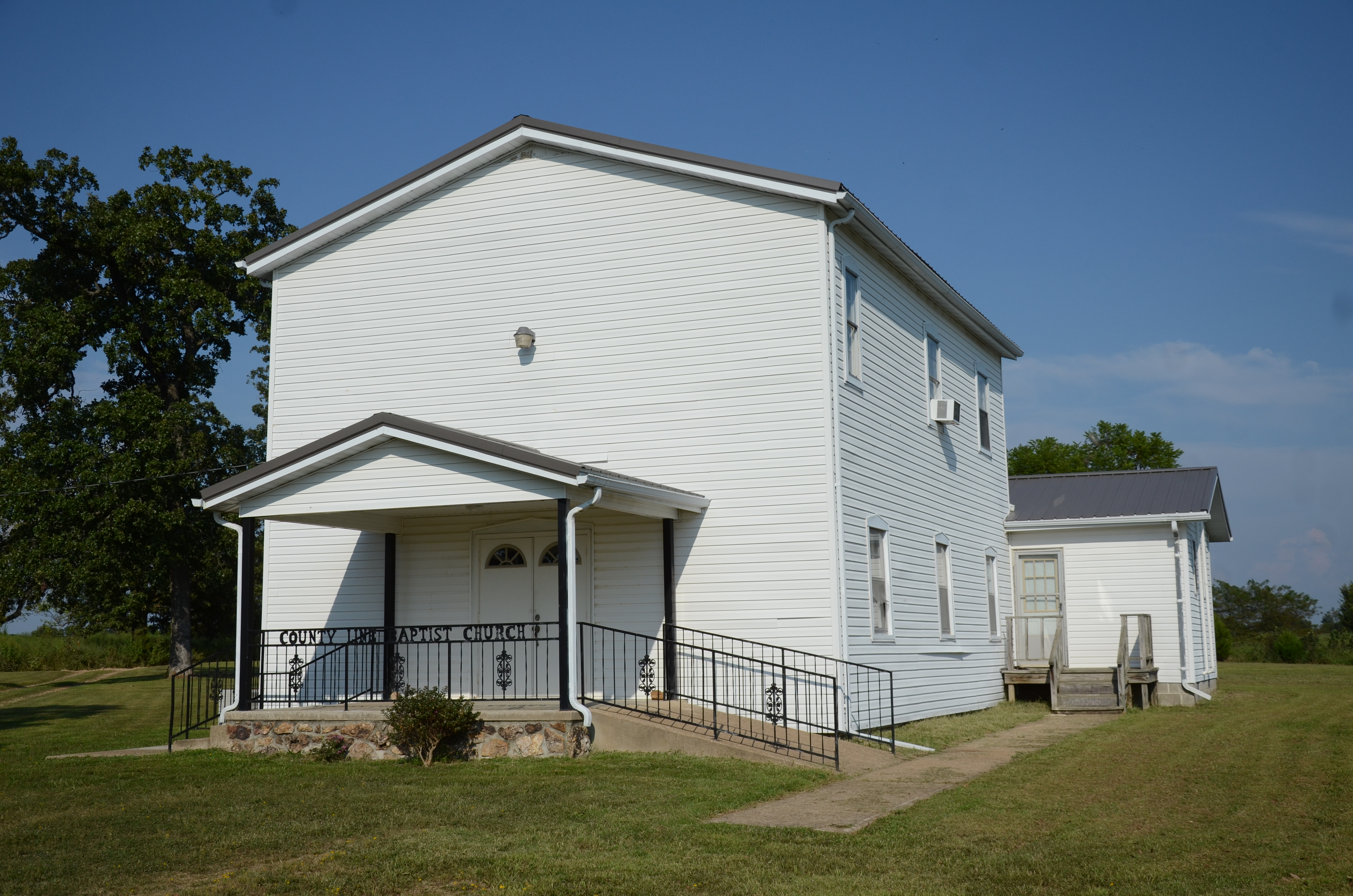

- Location within Arkansas Location within the United States
- Nearest city: Gepp, Arkansas
- Coordinates: 36°29′13″N 92°9′0″W
- Area: less than one acre
- Built: 1879
- Built by: John Milton Durham, Thomas Benton Caldwell
- NRHP reference No.: 75000386
- Added to NRHP: March 27, 1975

The County Line School and Lodge is a historic multifunction community building in rural western Fulton County, Arkansas. It stands at the junction of County Roads 115 and 236, just east of the county line with Baxter County, west of the small community of Gepp. It is a vernacular two story wood-frame structure with a gable roof and a cast stone foundation. The ground floor houses a school room, and the upper floor was used for meetings of the County Line Masonic Lodge. It was built c. 1879, and was one of the first community buildings to be built in the area. Intended to actually stand astride the county line (since it served communities in both counties), a later survey determined it lies a few feet within Fulton County. The building was used as a school until 1948, when the local school systems were consolidated.

The building was listed on the National Register of Historic Places in 1975, at which time it was still in use by the Masons.

== See also ==
- National Register of Historic Places listings in Fulton County, Arkansas
