= Salem School District =

Salem School District may refer to:

- Salem School District (Arkansas), based in Salem, Fulton County, Arkansas.
- Salem School District (Connecticut), based in Salem, Connecticut.
- Salem School District (Massachusetts), based in Salem, Massachusetts.
- Salem School District (New Hampshire), based in Salem, New Hampshire.
- Salem School District (Wisconsin), based in Salem, Kenosha County, Wisconsin.

Also, it may refer to:

- Salem City School District (New Jersey), based in Salem, New Jersey.
- Salem City School District (Ohio), based in Salem, Ohio.
- Salem-Keizer School District, based in Oregon.
- Benton-Carroll-Salem Local School District, based in Ohio.
- Greensburg-Salem School District, based in North Carolina.
