= Green Valley Homestead =

Historic house in Arkansas, United States

- U.S. National Register of Historic Places
- Location within Arkansas Location within the United States
- Location: 2605 Sturkie Rd., near Salem, Fulton County, Arkansas
- Coordinates: 36°24′20″N 91°50′37″W
- Area: 2.5 acres (1.0 ha)
- Architectural style: Rustic
- NRHP reference No.: 100001994
- Added to NRHP: January 26, 2018

The Green Valley Homestead is a historic farm complex at 2605 Sturkie Road in rural Fulton County, Arkansas, northwest of Salem. The farmstead includes more than 200 acres (81 ha) of land, with a farmstead complex that includes a house, outhouse, root cellar, barn, chicken coop, and carriage house. All of these buildings are built using materials from the property, including fieldstone for the foundations and logs for many of the structural elements of the buildings. They were built between about 1936 and 1943, and are a rare example of the Rustic architectural style in a residential/agricultural settings.

A 2.5-acre (1.0 ha) portion of the property was listed on the National Register of Historic Places in 2018.

== See also ==
- National Register of Historic Places listings in Fulton County, Arkansas
