= T.H. Morris House =

Historic house in Arkansas, United States

- T. H. Morris House
- U.S. National Register of Historic Places
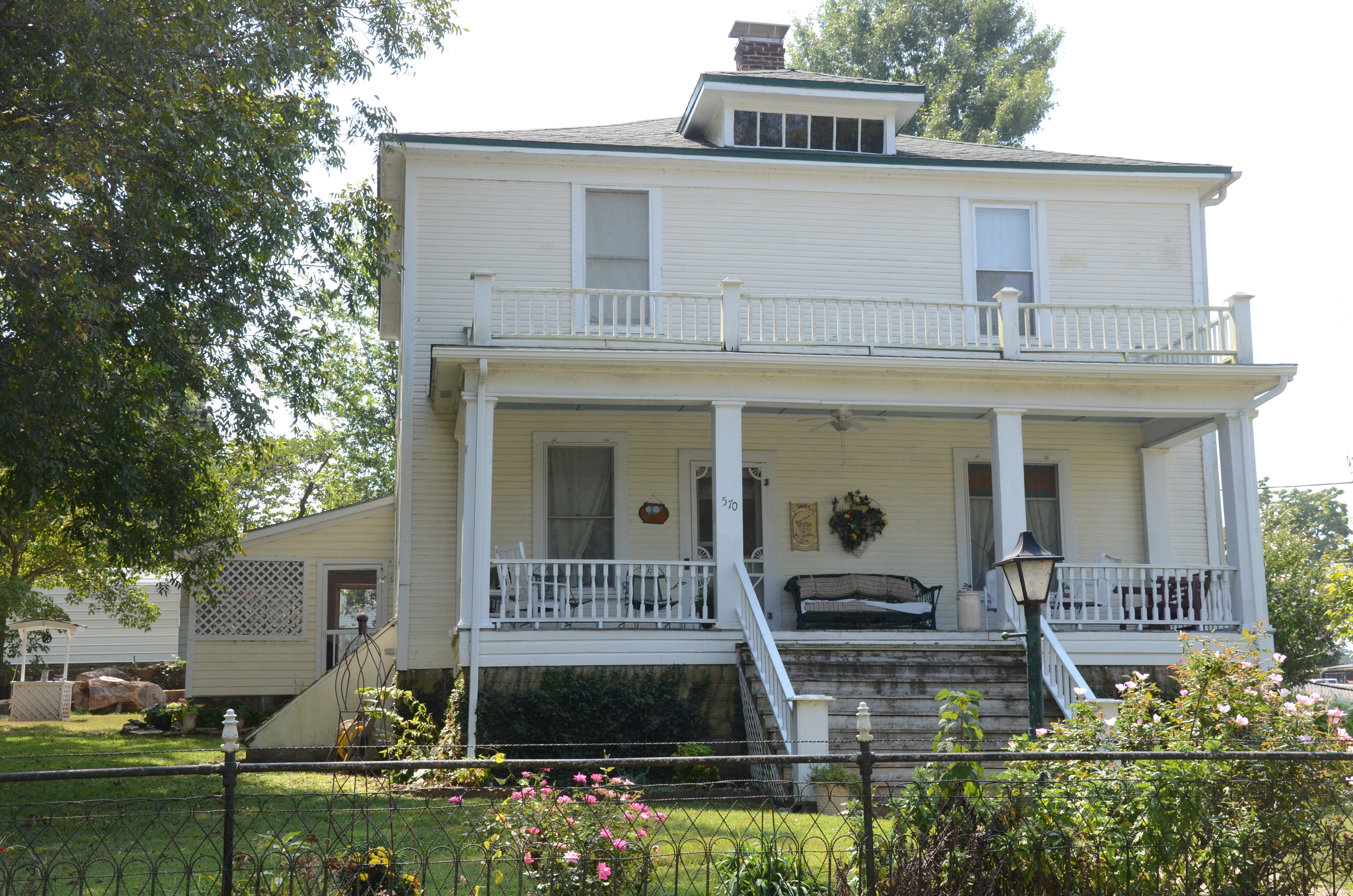

- Location within Arkansas Location within the United States
- Location: Jct. of 6th and Bethel Sts., Mammoth Spring, Arkansas
- Coordinates: 36°29′41″N 91°32′37″W
- Area: less than one acre
- Architectural style: American foursquare
- NRHP reference No.: 90001462
- Added to NRHP: September 13, 1990

The T.H. Morris House is a historic house at the southeast corner of 6th and Bethel Streets in Mammoth Spring, Arkansas. It is a 2 1/2-story wood-frame American Foursquare structure, with a hip roof, and front and rear porches. The front porch has square columns and pilasters with simple capitals, and a simple balustrade. Built in 1908 for the owner of the local hardware store, it is the city's best example of American Foursquare architecture.

The house was listed on the National Register of Historic Places in 1990.

== See also ==
- National Register of Historic Places listings in Fulton County, Arkansas
