= Heart, Arkansas =

- Unincorporated community
- Location within Arkansas Location within the United States
- Coordinates: 36°19′25″N 91°42′54″W
- Country: United States
- State: Arkansas
- County: Fulton
- Elevation: 600 ft (180 m)
- Time zone: UTC-6 (Central (CST))
  - Summer (DST): UTC-5 (CDT)
- GNIS feature ID: 57053

Heart is an unincorporated community in Fulton County, Arkansas, United States.

Heart is located on Heart Road (County Road 2227), 3.2 miles (5.1 km) northeast of Glencoe. Lick Creek flows past the east side of the community to join the South Fork Spring River about one mile to the north. Heart Church is located north of the settlement.

Heart is protected by the Agnos-Heart-Glencoe Volunteer Fire Department.
