= Benton Township, Fulton County, Arkansas =

Benton Township
- Township
- Location in Arkansas Benton Township (the United States)
- Coordinates: 36°22′21″N 91°50′55″W
- Country: United States
- State: Arkansas
- County: Fulton

Area
  - Total: 59.552 sq mi (154.24 km^{2})
  - Land: 59.493 sq mi (154.09 km^{2})
  - Water: 0.059 sq mi (0.15 km^{2})
- Elevation: 781 ft (238 m)

Population (2010)
  - Total: 2,564
  - Density: 43.10/sq mi (16.64/km^{2})
- Time zone: UTC-6 (CST)
  - Summer (DST): UTC-5 (CDT)
- FIPS code: 05-90243
- GNIS ID: 66573

Benton Township is a township in Fulton County, Arkansas, United States. Its total population was 2,564 as of the 2010 United States census, an increase of 3.26 percent from 2,483 at the 2000 census.

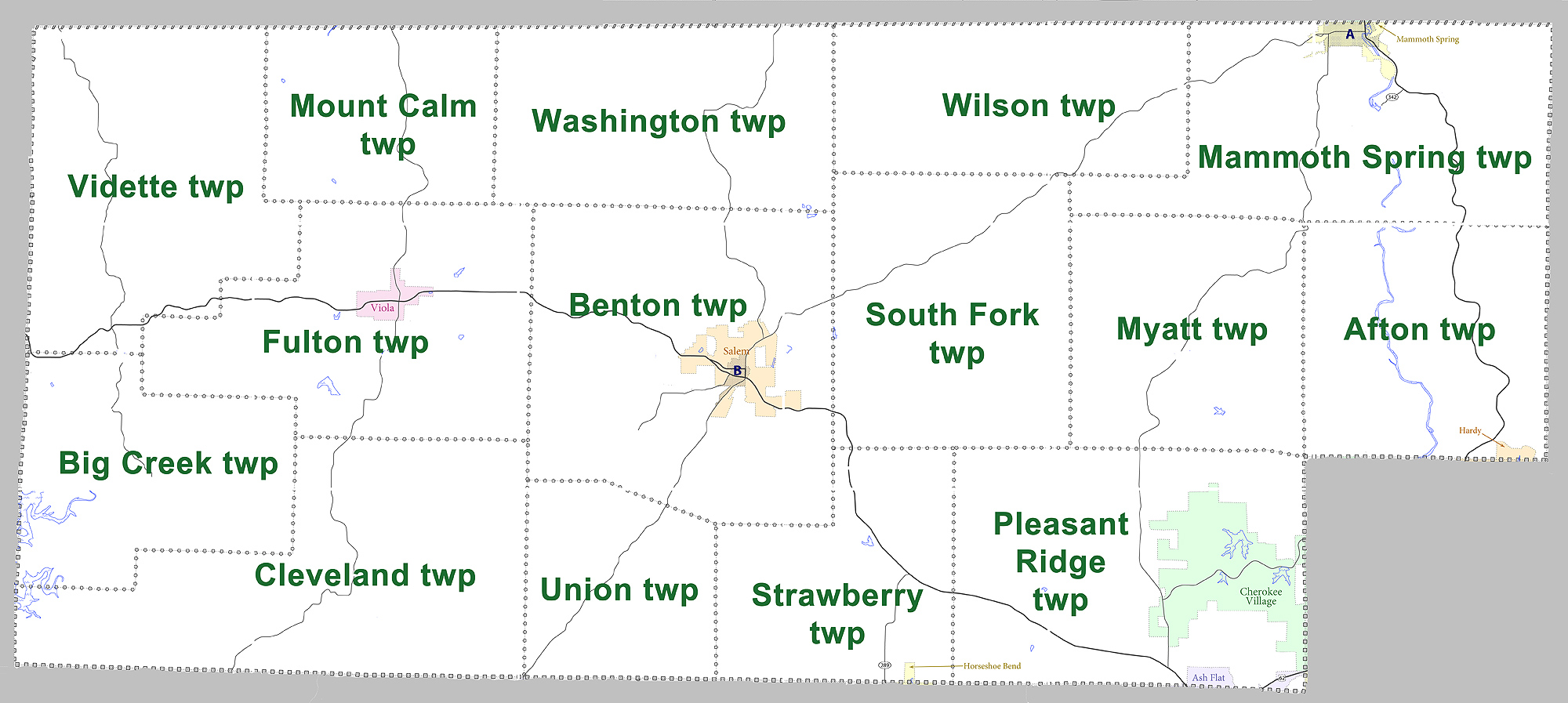
Townships in Fulton County as of 2010

According to the 2010 Census, Benton Township is located at 36°22′21″N 91°50′55″W (36.372416, -91.848591). It has a total area of 59.552 square miles (154.24 square kilometers), of which 59.493 sq mi (154.09 km^{2}) is land and 0.059 sq mi (0.15 km^{2}) is water (0.10%). As per the USGS National Elevation Dataset, the elevation is 781 feet (238 m).

The city of Salem is located within the township.
