= Camp Methodist Church =

Historic church in Arkansas, United States

- U.S. National Register of Historic Places
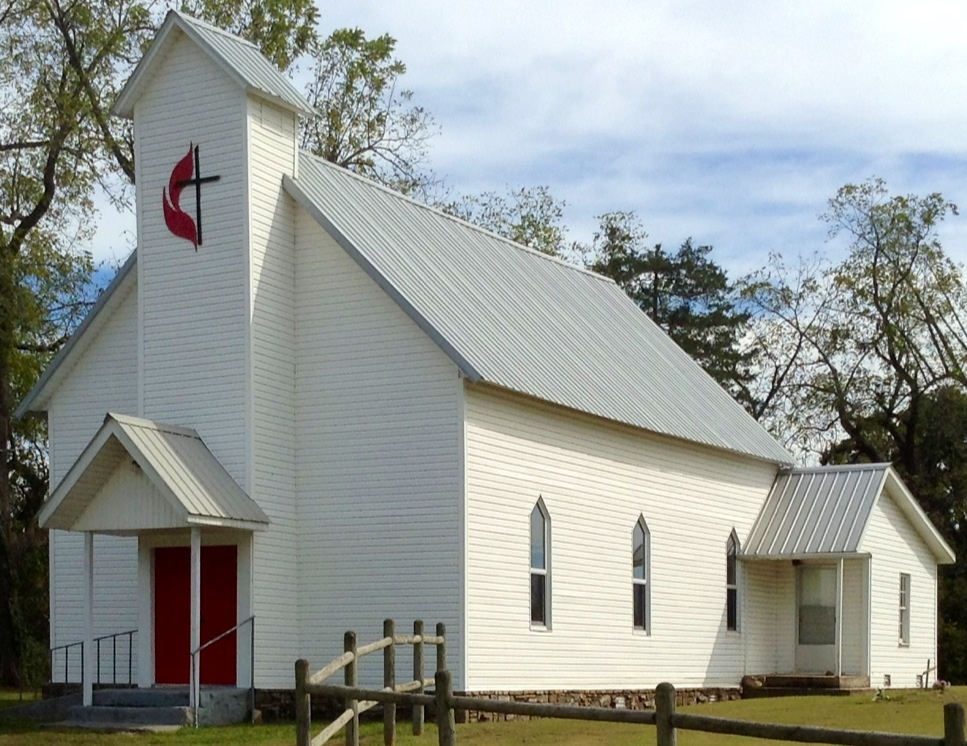

- Location within Arkansas Location within the United States
- Location: AR 9, approximately 6 mi. E of Salem, Camp, Arkansas
- Coordinates: 36°24′44″N 91°44′16″W
- Area: less than one acre
- Built: 1878
- Architectural style: Plain traditional, later Gothic Revival
- NRHP reference No.: 97000402
- Added to NRHP: May 9, 1997

The Camp Methodist Church is a historic Methodist church on Arkansas Highway 9 in Camp, Arkansas. The church was built in 1878 to serve the Camp Methodist Congregation; it was constructed by local carpenters in a vernacular style with Gothic Revival features. A school operated in the church building until 1914. In the 1980s, church services were briefly cancelled due to the shrinking congregation; former church members rehabilitated the church in 1983, after which services began again. The church was added to the National Register of Historic Places on May 9, 1997.

The building was listed on the National Register of Historic Places in 1997.

== See also ==
- National Register of Historic Places listings in Fulton County, Arkansas
