= Saint Andrew's Episcopal Church (Mammoth Spring, Arkansas) =

Historic church in Arkansas, United States

- U.S. National Register of Historic Places
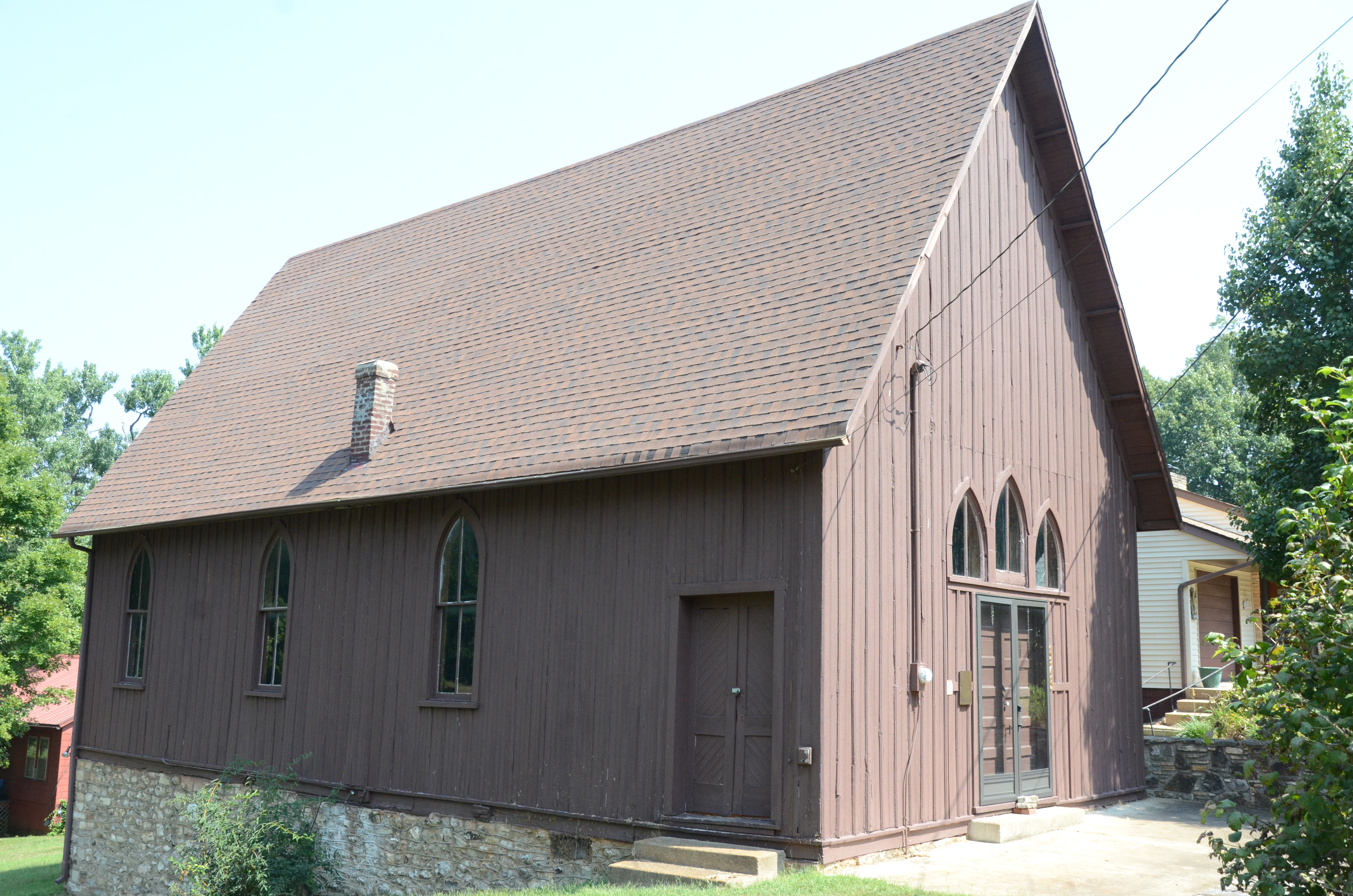

- Location within Arkansas Location within the United States
- Location: AR 9, Mammoth Spring, Arkansas
- Coordinates: 36°29′42″N 91°31′58″W
- Area: less than one acre
- Built: 1888
- Architectural style: Gothic
- NRHP reference No.: 86002944
- Added to NRHP: November 26, 1986

Saint Andrew's Episcopal Church is a historic church at Sixth and Main Street (Arkansas Highway 9) in Mammoth Spring, Arkansas. It is a single-story wooden-frame structure, with board-and-batten siding, a steeply pitched gable roof, and lancet-arch windows, all characteristics of the Gothic Revival. Built in 1888, it was moved about one block to its present location c. 1920. It served its original congregation (founded in 1885) until the 1940s, and has since then been used as a clubhouse and community center.

The building was listed on the National Register of Historic Places in 1986. The former congregation was part of the Episcopal Diocese of Arkansas.

== See also ==
- Episcopal Diocese of Arkansas
- National Register of Historic Places listings in Fulton County, Arkansas
