= Ruth, Arkansas =

- Unincorporated community
- Location within Arkansas Location within the United States
- Coordinates: 36°22′12″N 92°08′11″W
- Country: United States
- State: Arkansas
- County: Fulton
- Elevation: 797 ft (243 m)
- Time zone: UTC-6 (Central (CST))
  - Summer (DST): UTC-5 (CDT)
- ZIP code: 72531
- Area code: 870

Ruth is an unincorporated community in Fulton County, Arkansas, United States. The community is located on a county road just south of the U.S. Route 62-U.S. Route 412 concurrency and 6.7 miles (10.8 km) east of Henderson and Norfork Lake. Gepp lies 2.5 miles (4.0 km) to the east.
