= Salem High School (Arkansas) =

Location
- 313 Hwy 62 East; Salem, Arkansas 72576; United States
- Coordinates: 36°21′33″N 91°48′59″W

Information
- School type: Public comprehensive
- Status: Open
- School district: Salem School District
- CEEB code: 042215
- NCES School ID: 051209000975
- Faculty: 27.91
- Grades: 7–12
- Enrollment: 416 (2023-2024)
- Student to teacher ratio: 12.65
- Education system: ADE Smart Core
- Classes offered: Regular, Advanced Placement (AP)
- Colors: Black and gold
- Athletics conference: 2A 3 (football); 2A 2 (basketball) (2012–14)
- Sports: Football, Golf, Cross Country, Basketball, Baseball, Softball, Track, Cheer
- Mascot: Greyhound
- Team name: Salem Greyhounds
- Accreditation: ADE; AdvancED (1997-)
- Website: www.salemschools.net/high-school

Salem High School is a comprehensive public high school located in Salem, Fulton County, Arkansas, United States. It is one of three public high schools in Fulton County and the sole high school administered by Salem School District. For the 2010–11 school year, the school provides secondary education for more than 330 students in grades 7 through 12 and employs more than 27 educators.

== Academics ==
The assumed course of study for Salem students follows the Smart Core curriculum developed by the Arkansas Department of Education (ADE), which requires students complete 22 units prior to graduation. Students complete regular coursework and exams and may elect to take Advanced Placement (AP) courses and exams with the opportunity for college credit. The school is accredited by the ADE and has been accredited by AdvancED since 1997.

== Athletics ==
The Salem High School athletic emblem and mascot is the Greyhound with black and gold serving as the school colors.

The Salem Greyhounds compete in interscholastic activities within the 2A Classification—the state's second smallest classification—via the 2A Region 2 Conference administered by the Arkansas Activities Association. The Greyhounds field teams in football, golf (boys/girls), cross country (boys/girls), basketball (boys/girls), cheer, baseball, softball, track and field (boys/girls), and Volleyball (girls). The Greyhounds won their first state championship in football in 2024.
