= Glencoe, Arkansas =

- Unincorporated community
- Location within Arkansas Location within the United States
- Coordinates: 36°17′39″N 91°44′51″W
- Country: United States
- State: Arkansas
- County: Fulton
- Elevation: 784 ft (239 m)
- Time zone: UTC-6 (Central (CST))
  - Summer (DST): UTC-5 (CDT)
- ZIP code: 72539
- Area code: 870
- GNIS feature ID: 57032

Glencoe is an unincorporated community in southern Fulton County, Arkansas, United States. Glencoe is located at the junction of U.S. Routes 62 and 412 and Arkansas Highway 289, 7 miles (11 km) southeast of Salem and 4 miles (6.4 km) north of Horseshoe Bend in Izard County. Glencoe has a post office with ZIP code 72539.
