= Sturkie, Arkansas =

- Unincorporated community
- Location within Arkansas Location within the United States
- Coordinates: 36°27′26″N 91°52′24″W
- Country: United States
- State: Arkansas
- County: Fulton
- Elevation: 728 ft (222 m)
- Time zone: UTC-6 (Central (CST))
  - Summer (DST): UTC-5 (CDT)
- ZIP code: 72578
- Area code: 870
- GNIS feature ID: 58702

Sturkie is an unincorporated community in northern Fulton County, Arkansas, United States. Sturkie is 6.5 miles (10.5 km) north-northwest of Salem on Sturkie Road. Sturkie has a post office with ZIP code 72578.
