= Mammoth Spring State Park =

State park in Arkansas, United States

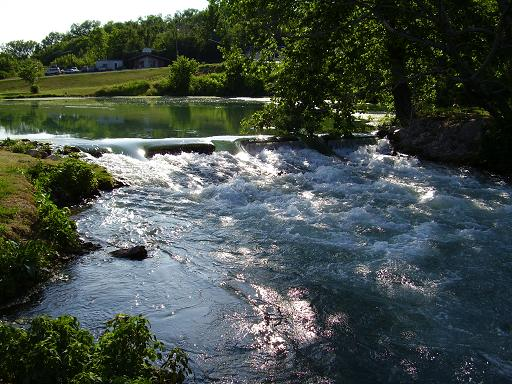
- Mammoth Spring near average flow conditions

- Location within Arkansas Location within the United States
- Interactive map of Mammoth Spring State Park
- Location: Mammoth Spring, Arkansas, United States
- Coordinates: 36°29′45″N 91°32′06″W
- Area: 62.5 acres (25.3 ha)
- Established: 1957
- Administrator: Arkansas Department of Parks, Heritage and Tourism
- Website: Official website
- Arkansas State Parks

U.S. National Natural Landmark
- Designated: June 1972

U.S. National Register of Historic Places
- Official name: Mammoth Spring Dam and Lake
- Type: Structure
- Designated: July 15, 2009
- Reference no.: 09000512

U.S. National Register of Historic Places
- Official name: Kansas City, Fort Scott and Memphis Railroad Depot
- Type: Building
- Designated: June 11, 1992
- Reference no.: 92000617

Mammoth Spring State Park is a 62.5-acre (25.3 ha) Arkansas state park in Fulton County, Arkansas in the United States. The park is located surrounding National Natural Landmark of the same name to provide recreation and interpretation for visitors. The park offers fishing, boating and hiking in addition to an Arkansas Welcome Center and restored 1886 Kansas City, Fort Scott and Memphis Railroad (later the St. Louis–San Francisco Railway or "Frisco") depot operating as a railroad museum. The site became a state park in 1957, but the park continued to add area until 1975.

== Mammoth Spring ==
Originating in the park, Mammoth Spring averages a flow rate of 9,780,000 US gallons (37,000,000 L) per hour of 58 °F (14 °C) water. Rainfall in southern Missouri percolates into the ground, flows through Grand Gulf State Park and reemerges as Mammoth Spring in Arkansas.

== History ==
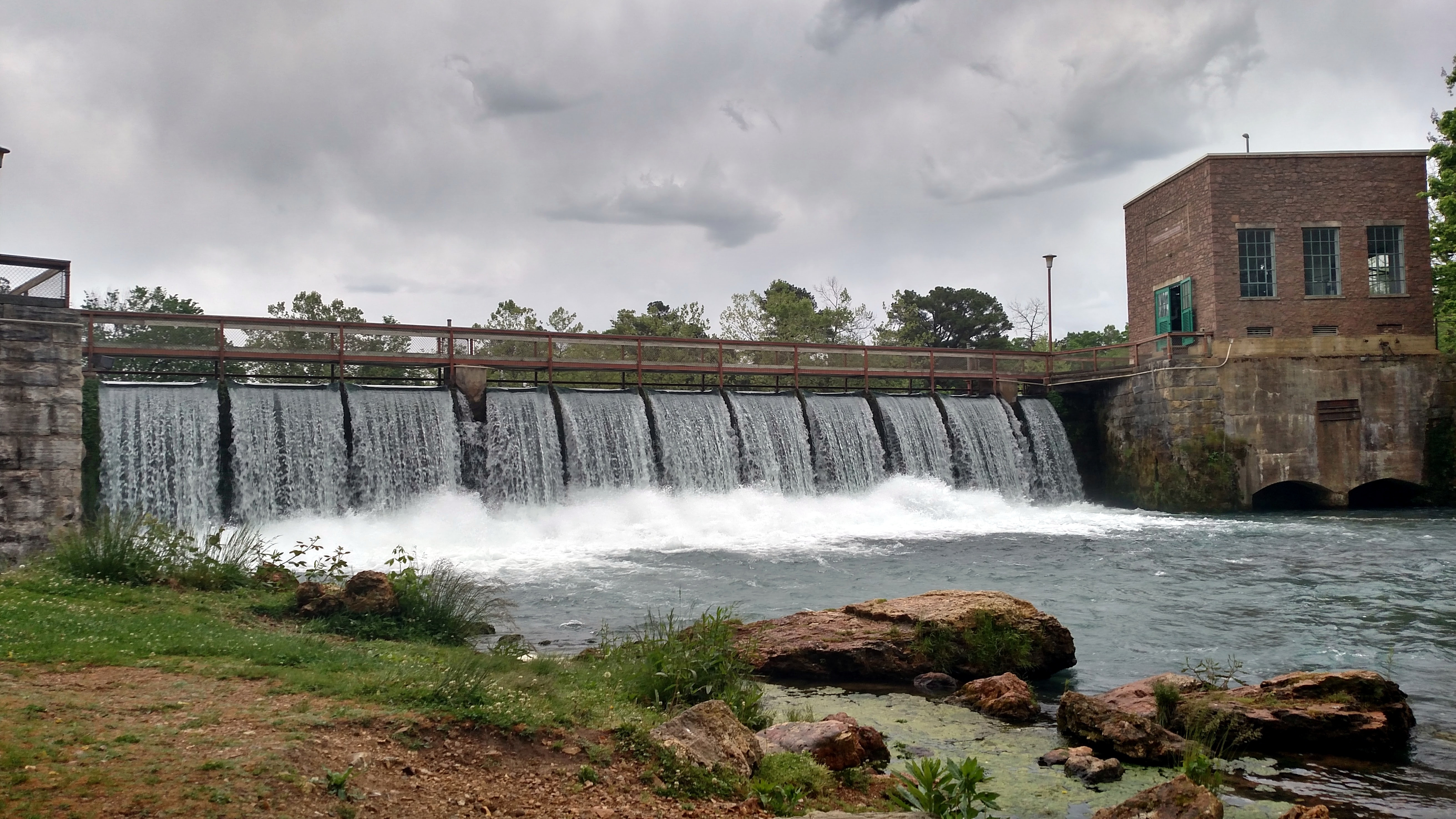
Hydroelectric dam on Spring River in Mammoth Spring State Park

In 1887, the Mammoth Spring Improvement and Water Power Company constructed the 198-foot (60 m) limestone dam which created Spring Lake. This dam initially powered a flour mill, cotton mill, and cotton gin. This property was acquired in 1925 by the Arkansas-Missouri Power Company, which constructed a hydroelectric facility that was operated until 1972. The company donated this property to the state to become part of the state park. These facilities, including the lake, are listed on the National Register of Historic Places.

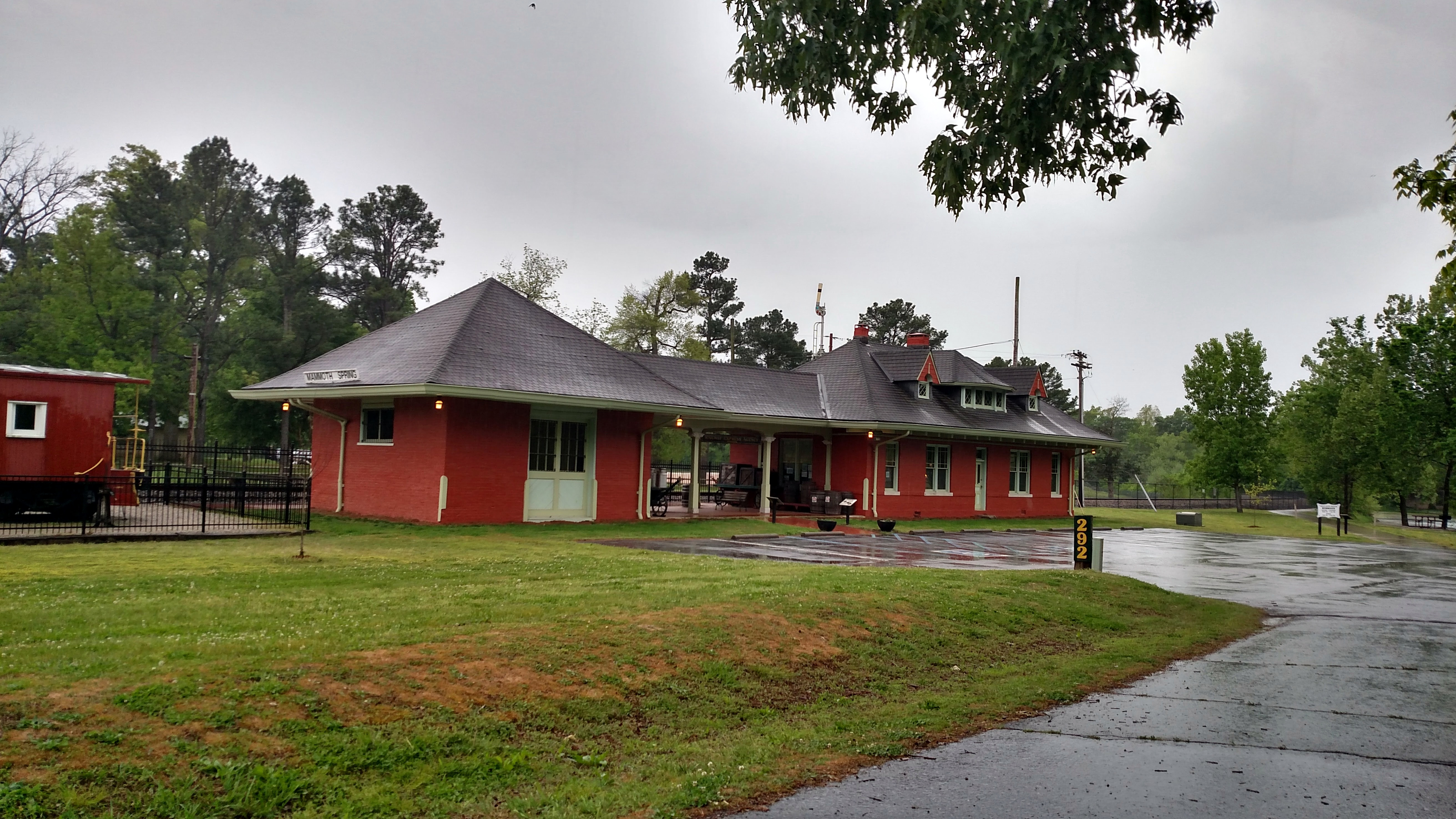
Historic Mammoth Spring train depot

Prior to 1957, the Mammoth Spring Cattle Sales Barn was co-owned and run by local entrepreneur Kenneth "Bert" Bishop and his associate, roughly on the site where the tourist information center now stands. Local farmers would routinely come to the site to sell livestock and other wares, such as Howard Green, who sold home-made walking sticks. Following this period in history, the State legislature voted to condemn the land and turn the spot into a state park. 1957, the park was established. The original Frisco Depot, and 1885 Victorian train station, was restored in 1971. The depot now functions as a museum, containing artifacts and memorabilia; it was listed on the National Register in 1992.

== Recreation ==
The park offers a visitor center/Arkansas Welcome Center to interpret the history of the region. A short walking trail leads to the restored train depot that formerly provided a connection for the city of Mammoth Spring to the Frisco Railway. Items of historical significance from the surrounding area, including a restored caboose, are on display in the museum. The former hydroelectric plant and mill nearby allow visitors to understand the economic importance the spring had to the early development of the nearby city. A pavilion, picnic areas, baseball field, and playground are available for visitors as well. Seasonal boat rentals on Spring Lake can be obtained at the visitor center.

== See also ==
- National Register of Historic Places listings in Fulton County, Arkansas

Preceding station	St. Louis–San Francisco Railway	Following station
Thayer toward Kansas City	Kansas City – Birmingham	Saddler Falls toward Birmingham
