= Mammoth Spring =

Spring in Arkansas

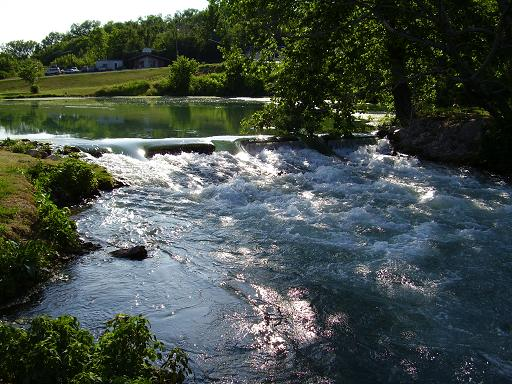
- The Mammoth Spring outlet at normal flow stage. Pictured from the east looking westwardly.

Location
- Country: United States
- State: Arkansas
- Region: Ozark Plateau
- City: Mammoth Spring

Physical characteristics
- Source: Spring River watershed
  - location: Salem Plateau, Ozark Plateau, Missouri
- Mouth: Spring River
  - location: Mammoth Spring, AR
  - coordinates: 36°29′51″N 91°32′08″W
  - elevation: 490 ft (150 m)
- Discharge
  - location: Mammoth Spring(harmonic mean flow)1981-2015
  - average: 322 cu ft/s (9.1 m^{3}/s)(harmonic mean flow)1981-2015
  - maximum: 694 cu ft/s (19.7 m^{3}/s)

Basin features
- U.S. NNL: Designated 1972

Mammoth Spring is a large, first magnitude karst spring that arises in the Ozark Plateau within the state of Arkansas. It is the largest spring in Arkansas and the third-largest spring within the Ozark Plateau region behind Big Spring and Greer Spring. Mammoth Spring is the seventh-largest natural spring in the world.

The spring's outlet pool is contained entirely within Mammoth Spring State Park. The park is located in the town of Mammoth Spring, which lies in extreme north-central Arkansas. The outlet pool is adjacent to US Highway 63, only 500 ft. south of the Missouri border, and it can be readily seen from the highway. The spring's large discharge volume rushes a few hundred feet down the outlet channel before merging with the Warm Fork of the Spring River to form the Spring River. The cold water that emerges from the spring creates excellent trout fishing conditions and ample flow for water sports on the Spring River. Mammoth Spring was declared a National Natural Landmark by the Department of the Interior in June 1972.

== Description ==
Precipitation that falls in southern Missouri seeps into the water table and flows through a vast system of passages and cavities. These cavities form an underground river that ultimately emerges on the surface at the town of Mammoth Spring, Arkansas. The emerging water forms a 10-acre spring pool that drains over a high stone dam. The spring generates a harmonic mean flow of about 9 m³/s (322 cubic feet per second). The water emerges at a constant 14 °C (58 °F). The spring itself cannot be viewed at the Mammoth Spring site because its mouth is more than 21 m (70 ft) below the surface of the large spring pool.

Nine miles northwest of Mammoth Spring, visitors can see a portion of the underground river that feeds the spring at a collapsed cave in Grand Gulf State Park in Missouri. The remains of a portion of the cave are now a 40 m (130 ft) deep chasm with a natural bridge over it. Dye tests have proven that the water flowing through the 40 m (130 ft) chasm at Grand Gulf exits through the existing cave and emerges at Mammoth Spring.

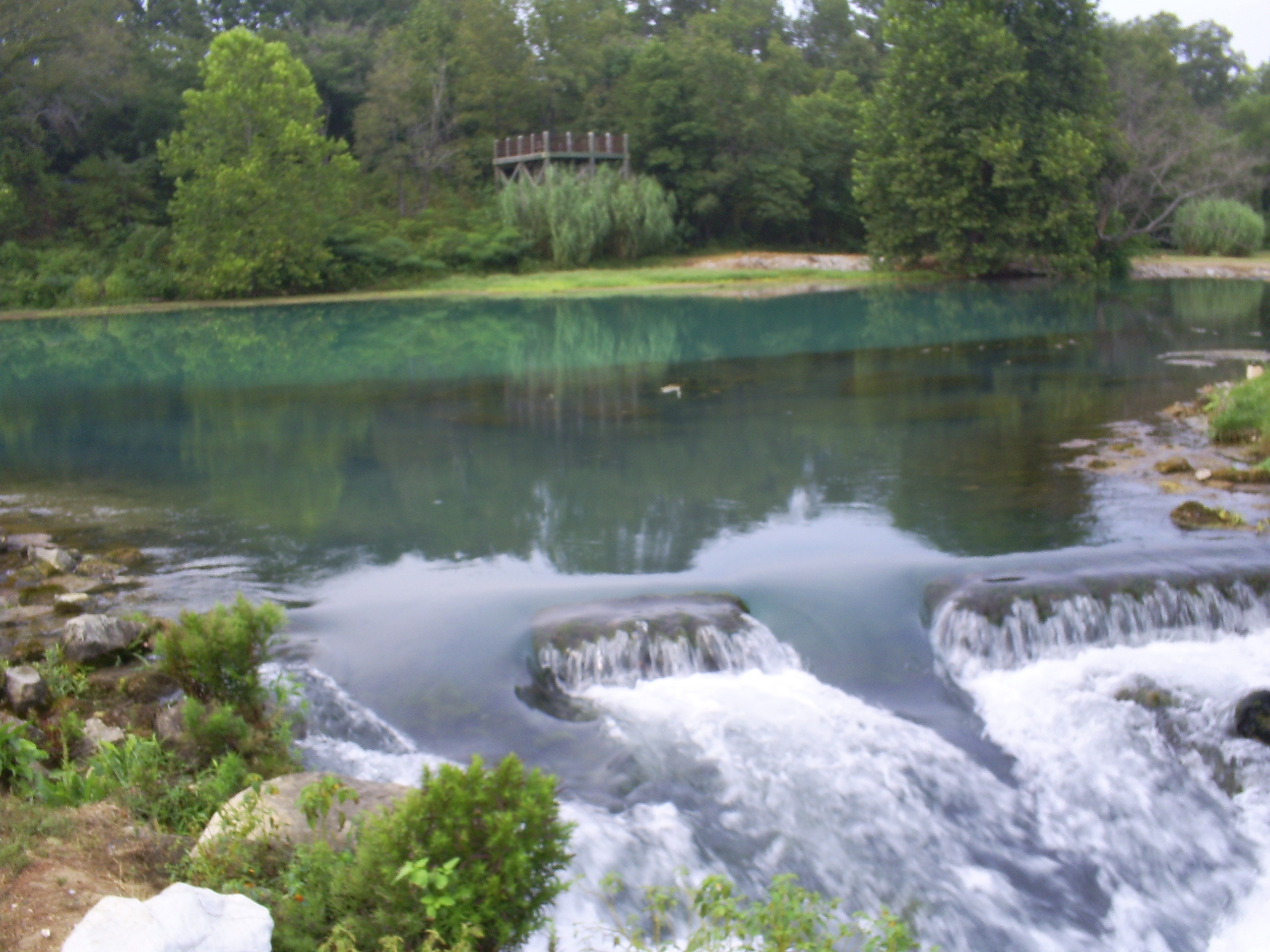
Mammoth Spring as viewed from the south looking north.

== Industrial use ==
The spring was used to power a gristmill from the times of the earliest European settlement. The Mammoth Spring Milling Company constructed a dam and a water-powered gristmill just downstream of the outlet of the spring lake. In 1925, the dam was purchased by the Arkansas-Missouri Power Company which constructed a hydroelectric plant at the dam. This plant supplied power to the surrounding area until 1972.

== Park ==
In 1957, Mammoth Spring State Park was established. Surrounding land claims could not be acquired until 1972, however. Prior to 1972, the Mammoth Spring Cattle Sales Barn was co-owned and run by local entrepreneur Bert Kenneth Bishop and his associate, roughly on the site of where the Welcome Center now stands. Local farmers would routinely come to the site to sell livestock and other wares, such as Howard Green, who sold home-made walking sticks. Following this period in history, the State legislature voted to condemn the land and join the plot to the state park.

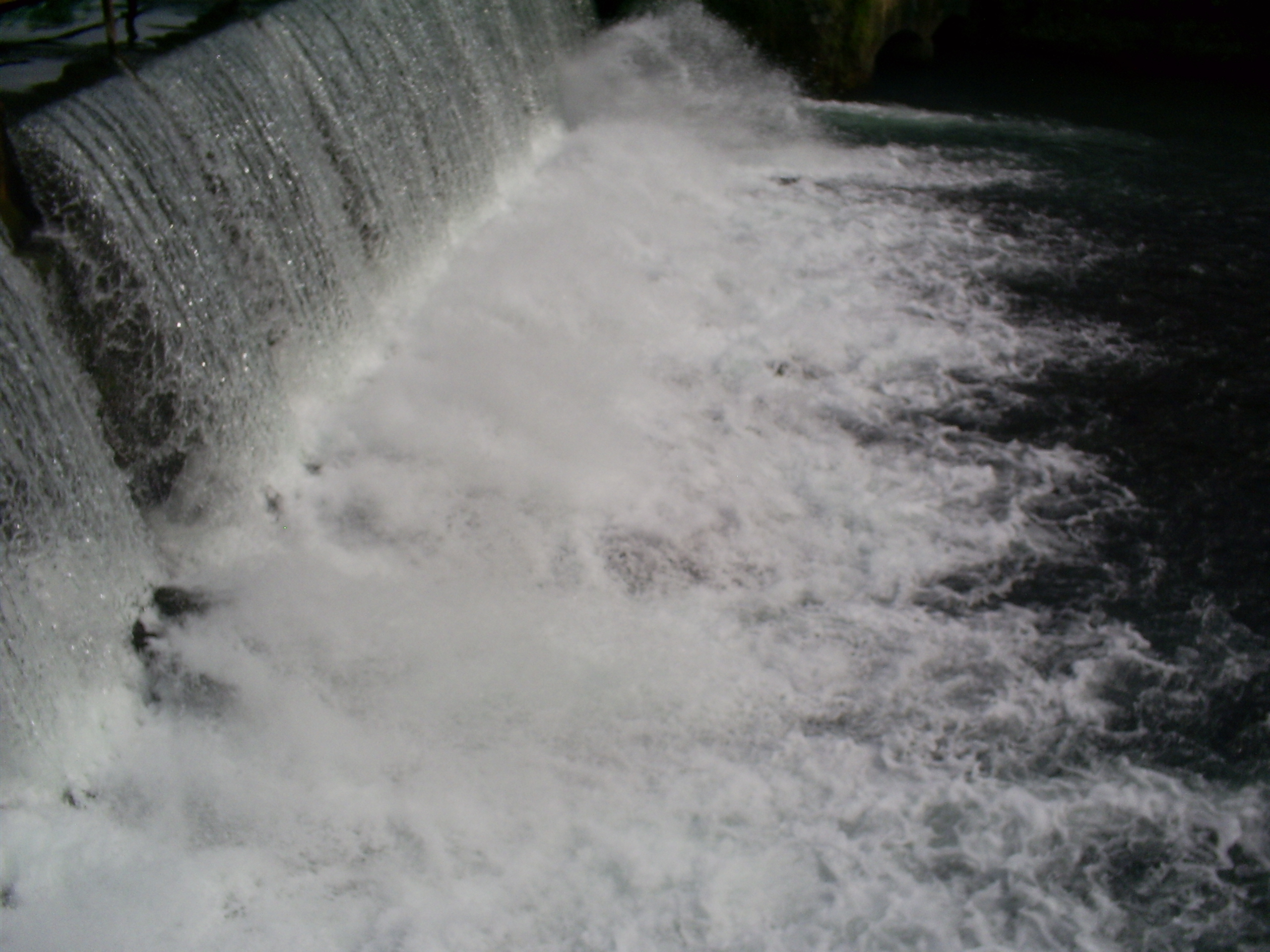
Mammoth Spring dam

The original Frisco Depot was restored in 1971 and now functions as a repository for artifacts and memorabilia related to the railroad and the spring area. The State Park provides a visitor center, picnic areas, walking trails, and tour access to the dam and hydro plant.

The United States Fish and Wildlife Service maintains a fish hatchery near the spring.

== See also ==
- List of Arkansas state parks
- List of Arkansas rivers
- List of Missouri rivers
- List of Ozark springs
