= Wild Cherry, Arkansas =

Unincorporated community in Arkansas, US

Wild Cherry
- unincorporated community
- Location within the state of Arkansas Wild Cherry (the United States)
- Coordinates: 36°15′50″N 92°03′25″W
- Country: United States
- State: Arkansas
- County: Fulton
- Elevation: 850 ft (260 m)
- Time zone: UTC-6 (Central)
  - Summer (DST): UTC-5 (CDT)
- Area code: 870

Wild Cherry is an unincorporated community in southwest Fulton County, Arkansas, United States. It is located along Arkansas Highway 223, just north of the Fulton-Izard county line. Wild Cherry Road runs north from the community. It is approximately six miles east of the eastern shore of Norfork Lake and about 11 miles north of Calico Rock. The elevation is 850 feet.
