= County Line, Arkansas =

Unincorporated community in Arkansas, US

Coordinates: 36°29′12″N 92°09′03″W

County Line is an unincorporated community in the northwest corner of Fulton County, Arkansas, United States. The community church is in Fulton County, adjacent to the county line and the County Line Cemetery is across the line to the west in northeast Baxter County. The community lies approximately one-half mile to the southeast of Bennetts Bayou.
