= Grand Gulf State Park (Missouri) =

State park in Missouri, United States

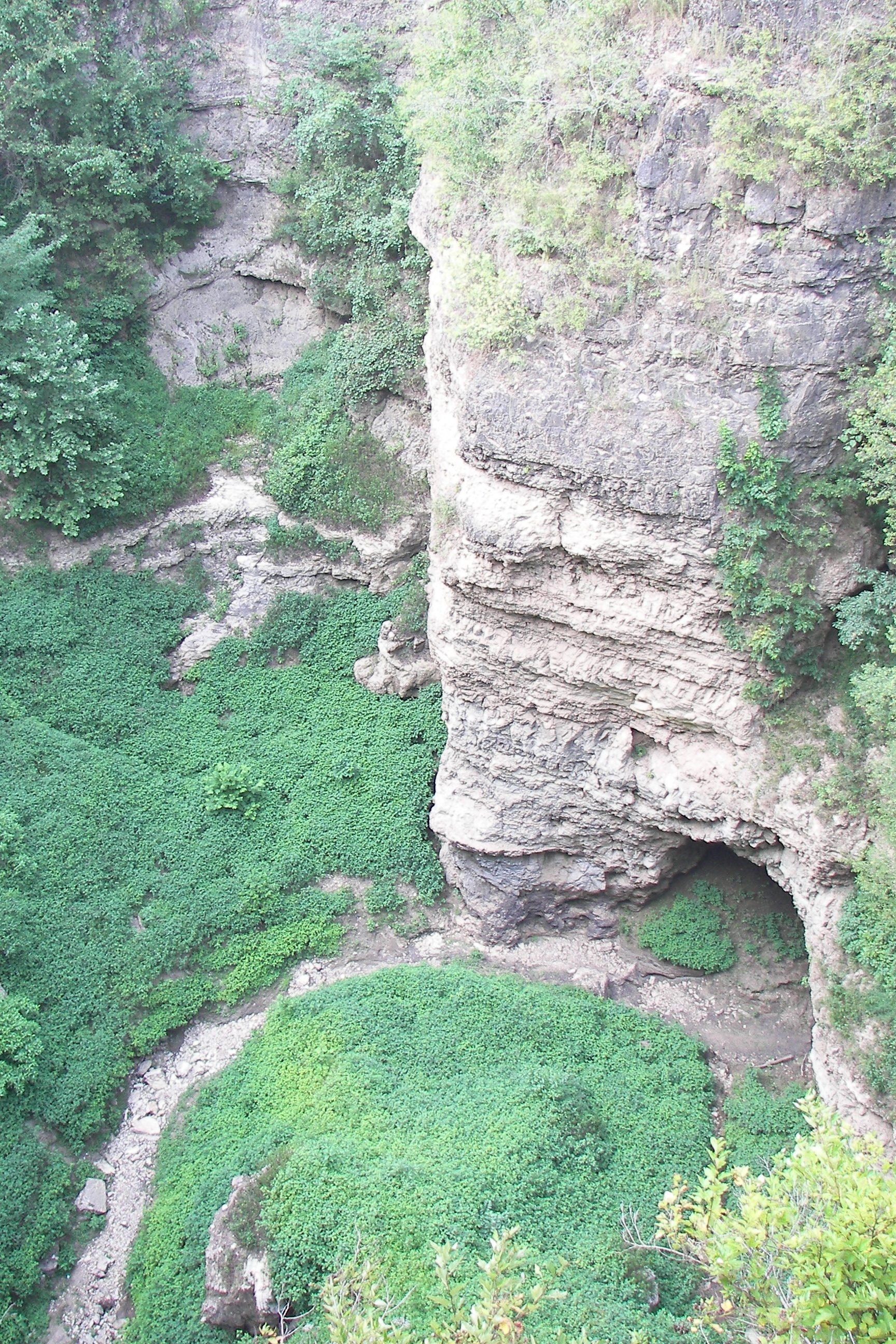
- Water entering this cave reappears nine miles (14 km) away at Mammoth Spring.

- Location within Missouri Location within the United States
- Location: Oregon County, Missouri, United States
- Coordinates: 36°32′39″N 91°38′48″W
- Area: 321.96 acres (130.29 ha)
- Elevation: 646 ft (197 m)
- Established: 1984
- Administrator: Missouri Department of Natural Resources
- Visitors: 57,524 (in 2022)
- Website: Official website

Grand Gulf State Park is a state-operated, privately owned and publicly accessible, geologic preserve near Thayer, Missouri, United States, encompassing a forked canyon that is the remnant of an ancient collapsed dolomite cave system. The land that is now the park was acquired by conservationist Leo Drey (1917–2015) before becoming part of the Missouri state parks system. The 322-acre (130 ha) state park has been operated by the Missouri Department of Natural Resources under a lease agreement with the L-A-D Foundation since 1984. Grand Gulf was declared a National Natural Landmark in 1971 as an excellent example of karst topography and underground stream piracy. A 60-acre (24 ha) portion of the park was designated by the state as the Grand Gulf Natural Area in 1986.

== Description ==
The Grand Gulf is nearly 1 mile (1.6 km) long and up to 130 feet (40 m) deep with sheer sides. An uncollapsed part of the original cavern roof spans 250 feet (76 m), creating one of the largest natural bridges in Missouri. A watershed of 28 square miles (73 km^{2}) feeds into the gulf which itself drains into a cave entrance at its eastern end. Dye traces have shown that water entering the cave in Grand Gulf emerges 1 to 4 days later at Mammoth Spring in Arkansas, 9 miles (14 km) distant.

== Facilities ==
The park has picnicking facilities and two trails for viewing the gulf. The park's heavy foliage makes fall and winter the best viewing seasons.
