= Fulton County, Arkansas =

County in Arkansas, United States

- County
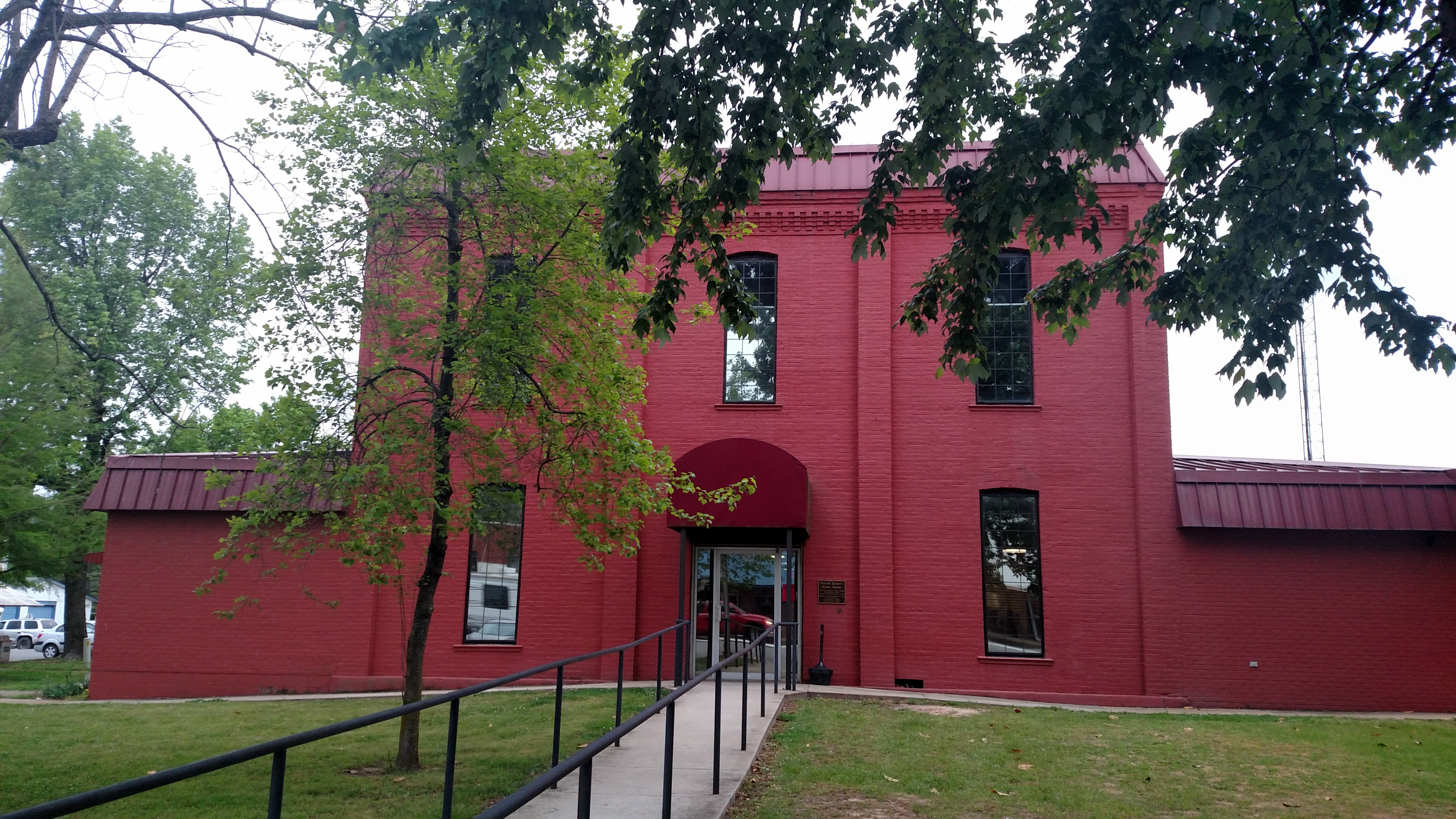
- Fulton County Courthouse in Salem

- Location within the U.S. state of Arkansas
- Coordinates: 36°23′19″N 91°48′52″W
- Country: United States
- State: Arkansas
- Founded: December 21, 1842
- Named for: William Fulton
- Seat: Salem
- Largest city: Salem

Area
  - Total: 620 sq mi (1,600 km^{2})
  - Land: 618 sq mi (1,600 km^{2})
  - Water: 2.1 sq mi (5.4 km^{2}) 0.3%

Population (2020)
  - Total: 12,075
  - Estimate (2025): 12,492 ▲
  - Density: 19.5/sq mi (7.54/km^{2})
- Time zone: UTC−6 (Central)
  - Summer (DST): UTC−5 (CDT)
- Congressional district: 1st
- Website: www.fultoncountyar.gov

Fulton County is a county located in the U.S. state of Arkansas. As of the 2020 census, the population was 12,075. The county seat is Salem. Fulton County was formed on December 21, 1842, and named for William Fulton, the last governor of the Arkansas Territory. It is an alcohol prohibition or dry county.

== Geography ==
According to the U.S. Census Bureau, the county has a total area of 620 square miles (1,600 km^{2}), of which 618 square miles (1,600 km^{2}) is land and 2.1 square miles (5.4 km^{2}) (0.3%) is water.

=== Major highways ===
- US 62 / US 412
  - U.S. Highway 62 Business
- US 63
- Highway 9
- Highway 87
- Highway 175
- Highway 223
- Highway 289
- Highway 342
- Highway 395
- Highway 980

=== Adjacent counties ===
- Ozark County, Missouri (northwest)
- Howell County, Missouri (north)
- Oregon County, Missouri (northeast)
- Sharp County (east)
- Izard County (south)
- Baxter County (west)

== Demographics ==
Historical population
Census	Pop.	Note	%±
1850	1,819		—
1860	4,024		121.2%
1870	4,843		20.4%
1880	6,720		38.8%
1890	10,984		63.5%
1900	12,917		17.6%
1910	12,193		−5.6%
1920	11,182		−8.3%
1930	10,834		−3.1%
1940	10,253		−5.4%
1950	9,187		−10.4%
1960	6,657		−27.5%
1970	7,699		15.7%
1980	9,975		29.6%
1990	10,037		0.6%
2000	11,642		16.0%
2010	12,245		5.2%
2020	12,075		−1.4%
2025 (est.)	12,492	▲	3.5%
U.S. Decennial Census; 1790–1960 1900–1990; 1990–2000 2010

=== 2020 census ===
As of the 2020 census, the county had a population of 12,075. The median age was 47.9 years. 22.1% of residents were under the age of 18 and 26.0% of residents were 65 years of age or older. For every 100 females there were 97.5 males, and for every 100 females age 18 and over there were 96.4 males age 18 and over.

The racial makeup of the county was 93.2% White, 0.2% Black or African American, 0.5% American Indian and Alaska Native, 0.3% Asian, <0.1% Native Hawaiian and Pacific Islander, 0.5% from some other race, and 5.3% from two or more races. Hispanic or Latino residents of any race comprised 1.3% of the population.

<0.1% of residents lived in urban areas, while 100.0% lived in rural areas.

There were 4,991 households in the county, of which 25.4% had children under the age of 18 living in them. Of all households, 50.7% were married-couple households, 19.4% were households with a male householder and no spouse or partner present, and 23.7% were households with a female householder and no spouse or partner present. About 29.3% of all households were made up of individuals and 16.7% had someone living alone who was 65 years of age or older.

There were 6,185 housing units, of which 19.3% were vacant. Among occupied housing units, 79.5% were owner-occupied and 20.5% were renter-occupied. The homeowner vacancy rate was 2.2% and the rental vacancy rate was 12.3%.

=== 2000 census ===
As of the 2000 census, there were 11,642 people, 4,810 households, and 3,511 families residing in the county. The population density was 19 people per square mile (7.3 people/km^{2}). There were 5,973 housing units at an average density of 10 units per square mile (3.9 units/km^{2}). The racial makeup of the county was 97.67% White, 0.20% Black or African American, 0.67% Native American, 0.21% Asian, 0.06% from other races, and 1.19% from two or more races. 0.53% of the population were Hispanic or Latino of any race.

There were 4,810 households, out of which 27.40% had children under the age of 18 living with them, 62.40% were married couples living together, 7.80% had a female householder with no husband present, and 27.00% were non-families. 24.40% of all households were made up of individuals, and 12.80% had someone living alone who was 65 years of age or older. The average household size was 2.39 and the average family size was 2.83.

In the county, the population was spread out, with 22.80% under the age of 18, 6.40% from 18 to 24, 23.70% from 25 to 44, 27.00% from 45 to 64, and 20.20% who were 65 years of age or older. The median age was 43 years. For every 100 females there were 96.00 males. For every 100 females age 18 and over, there were 93.10 males.

The median income for a household in the county was $25,529, and the median income for a family was $29,952. Males had a median income of $22,213 versus $18,066 for females. The per capita income for the county was $15,712. About 12.70% of families and 16.30% of the population were below the poverty line, including 20.10% of those under age 18 and 12.70% of those age 65 or over.

== Government ==
The county government is a constitutional body granted specific powers by the Constitution of Arkansas and the Arkansas Code. The quorum court is the legislative branch of the county government and controls all spending and revenue collection. Representatives are called justices of the peace and are elected from county districts every even-numbered year. The number of districts in a county vary from nine to fifteen, and district boundaries are drawn by the county election commission. The Fulton County Quorum Court has nine members. Presiding over quorum court meetings is the county judge, who serves as the chief executive officer of the county. The county judge is elected at-large and does not vote in quorum court business, although capable of vetoing quorum court decisions.

Fulton County, Arkansas Elected countywide officials
Position	Officeholder	Party
County Judge	Kenneth Crow	Republican
County/Circuit Clerk	Vickie Bishop	Independent
Sheriff	Jake Smith	Republican
Treasurer	Barry Abney	Republican
Collector	Michelle Watkins	Republican
Assessor	Cari Long	Republican
Coroner	Steve Barker	Republican
Surveyor	Brian Keen	(Unknown)

The composition of the Quorum Court after the 2024 elections is 9 Republicans. Justices of the Peace (members) of the Quorum Court following the elections are:

- District 1: Cris Newberry (R)
- District 2: Dennis Kinder (R)
- District 3: Albert Roork (R)
- District 4: Gary Phillips (R)
- District 5: Scott Watkins (R)
- District 6: Marjorie A. Rogers (R)
- District 7: Gary Tanner (R)
- District 8: Jimmy Marler (R)
- District 9: Hank Burke (R)

Additionally, the townships of Fulton County are entitled to elect their own respective constables, as set forth by the Constitution of Arkansas. Constables are largely of historical significance as they were used to keep the peace in rural areas when travel was more difficult. The township constables as of the 2024 elections are:

- District 1: Clay Divelbiss (R)

Over the past few election cycles Fulton county has trended heavily towards the GOP. The last Democrat (as of 2024) to carry the county was Bill Clinton, in 1996.

United States presidential election results for Fulton County, Arkansas
Year	Republican		Democratic		Third party(ies)	
Year	No.	%	No.	%	No.	%
1896	333	20.88%	1,259	78.93%	3	0.19%
1900	397	28.54%	984	70.74%	10	0.72%
1904	359	40.11%	481	53.74%	55	6.15%
1908	366	30.96%	741	62.69%	75	6.35%
1912	453	34.24%	590	44.60%	280	21.16%
1916	392	26.34%	1,096	73.66%	0	0.00%
1920	502	39.13%	763	59.47%	18	1.40%
1924	292	29.00%	678	67.33%	37	3.67%
1928	686	42.29%	934	57.58%	2	0.12%
1932	237	16.09%	1,235	83.84%	1	0.07%
1936	437	31.53%	946	68.25%	3	0.22%
1940	333	28.15%	838	70.84%	12	1.01%
1944	525	44.23%	660	55.60%	2	0.17%
1948	339	27.63%	850	69.27%	38	3.10%
1952	890	45.92%	1,048	54.08%	0	0.00%
1956	799	45.12%	958	54.09%	14	0.79%
1960	1,127	60.95%	703	38.02%	19	1.03%
1964	846	33.09%	1,704	66.64%	7	0.27%
1968	1,198	36.34%	1,019	30.91%	1,080	32.76%
1972	2,030	67.89%	960	32.11%	0	0.00%
1976	1,038	27.94%	2,670	71.87%	7	0.19%
1980	2,101	49.35%	2,037	47.85%	119	2.80%
1984	2,329	55.15%	1,864	44.14%	30	0.71%
1988	1,918	48.47%	2,018	51.00%	21	0.53%
1992	1,258	26.56%	2,827	59.69%	651	13.75%
1996	1,351	31.99%	2,361	55.91%	511	12.10%
2000	2,036	49.56%	1,976	48.10%	96	2.34%
2004	2,522	50.90%	2,370	47.83%	63	1.27%
2008	2,702	57.78%	1,819	38.90%	155	3.31%
2012	2,949	65.21%	1,452	32.11%	121	2.68%
2016	3,471	72.74%	1,067	22.36%	234	4.90%
2020	3,961	77.38%	1,035	20.22%	123	2.40%
2024	4,040	80.11%	906	17.97%	97	1.92%

== Education ==
Fulton County is the home to several public school districts:

- Mammoth Spring School District, including Mammoth Spring High School.
- Salem School District, including Salem High School.
- Viola School District, including Viola High School.

== Communities ==
=== Cities ===
- Ash Flat
- Cherokee Village
- Hardy
- Horseshoe Bend
- Mammoth Spring
- Salem (county seat)

=== Town ===
- Viola

=== Unincorporated communities ===
- Bexar
- Camp
- County Line
- Elizabeth
- Gepp
- Glencoe
- Heart
- Many Islands
- Morriston
- Ruth
- Saddle
- Sturkie
- Wild Cherry

=== Townships ===
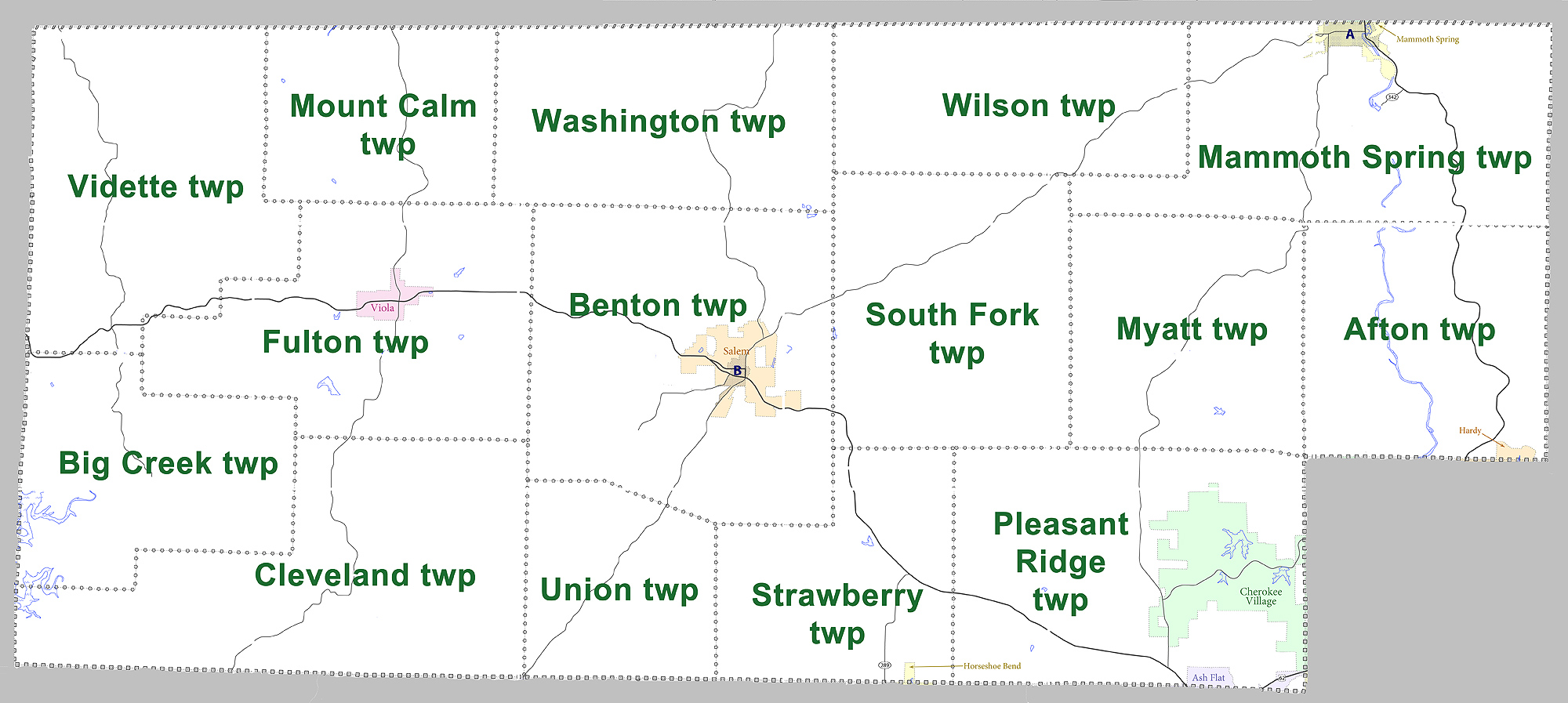
Townships in Fulton County, Arkansas, as of 2010

Townships in Arkansas are the divisions of a county. Each township includes unincorporated areas; some may have incorporated cities or towns within part of their boundaries. Arkansas townships have limited purposes in modern times. However, the United States census does list Arkansas population based on townships (sometimes referred to as "county subdivisions" or "minor civil divisions"). Townships are also of value for historical purposes in terms of genealogical research. Each town or city is within one or more townships in an Arkansas county based on census maps and publications. The townships of Fulton County are listed below; listed in parentheses are the cities, towns, and/or census-designated places that are fully or partially inside the township.

Township	FIPS code	ANSI code (GNIS ID)	Population center(s)	Pop. (2010)	Pop. density (/mi^{2})	Pop. density (/km^{2})	Total area (mi^{2})	Total area (km^{2})	Land area (mi^{2})	Land area (km^{2})	Water area (mi^{2})	Water area (km^{2})	Geographic coordinates
Afton	05-90006	00066571	part of Hardy	650	17.45	6.74	37.587	97.35	37.252	96.48	0.335	0.8676	36.379508°N 91.504051°W
Benton	05-90243	00066573	Salem	2,564	43.10	16.64	59.552	154.2	59.493	154.1	0.059	0.1528	36.372416°N 91.848591°W
Big Creek	05-90258	00066574		428	12.82	4.95	34.167	88.49	33.398	86.50	0.769	1.992	36.333345°N 92.111645°W
Cleveland	05-90855	00066575		514	9.44	3.65	54.677	141.6	54.450	141.0	0.227	0.5879	36.301335°N 92.014618°W
Fulton	05-91392	00066576	Viola	1,049	22.82	8.81	46.115	119.4	45.968	119.1	0.147	0.3807	36.388875°N 91.995757°W
Mammoth Spring	05-92361	00066577	Mammoth Spring	2,035	40.35	15.58	50.584	131.0	50.430	130.6	0.154	0.3989	36.461887°N 91.538778°W
Mount Calm	05-92619	00066578		207	7.78	3.0	26.627	68.96	26.611	68.92	0.016	0.04144	36.475816°N 91.987814°W
Myatt	05-92658	00066579		191	5.34	2.06	35.792	92.70	35.766	92.63	0.026	0.06734	36.377891°N 91.626355°W
Pleasant Ridge	05-92922	00066580	half of Cherokee Village, small part of Ash Flat	1,926	35.42	13.68	54.721	141.7	54.381	140.8	0.340	0.8806	36.283387°N 91.642620°W
South Fork	05-93429	00066581		485	11.33	4.37	42.819	110.9	42.805	110.9	0.014	0.03626	36.397657°N 91.725885°W
Strawberry	05-93498	00066582	small part of Horseshoe Bend	742	24.28	9.38	30.591	79.23	30.558	79.14	0.033	0.08547	36.302524°N 91.784817°W
Union	05-93681	00066583		303	13.08	5.05	23.158	59.98	23.158	59.98	0	0.000	36.290424°N 91.882059°W
Vidette	05-93798	00066584		467	9.70	3.74	48.143	124.7	48.143	124.7	0	0.000	36.445552°N 92.100286°W
Washington	05-93909	00066585		406	10.05	3.88	40.408	104.7	40.394	104.6	0.014	0.03626	36.463799°N 91.865792°W
Wilson	05-94086	00066587		278	7.86	3.03	35.387	91.65	35.387	91.65	0	0.000	36.471176°N 91.699477°W
Source: "Census 2010 U.S. Gazetteer Files: County Subdivisions in Arkansas". U.S. Census Bureau, Geography Division. Source: "Census 2010 U.S. Gazetteer Files". U.S. Census Bureau, Geography Division.

== See also ==
- List of lakes in Fulton County, Arkansas
- National Register of Historic Places listings in Fulton County, Arkansas
