= Horseshoe Bend, Arkansas =

- City
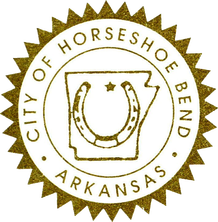
- Seal

- Location of Horseshoe Bend in Fulton County and Izard County and Sharp County, Arkansas.
- Coordinates: 36°13′28″N 91°44′40″W
- Country: United States
- State: Arkansas
- Counties: Izard, Fulton, Sharp

Area
  - Total: 14.66 sq mi (37.96 km^{2})
  - Land: 13.36 sq mi (34.60 km^{2})
  - Water: 1.30 sq mi (3.36 km^{2})
- Elevation: 643 ft (196 m)

Population (2020)
  - Total: 2,440
  - Estimate (2025): 2,623 ▲
  - Density: 182.6/sq mi (70.51/km^{2})
- Time zone: UTC-6 (Central (CST))
  - Summer (DST): UTC-5 (CDT)
- ZIP code: 72512
- Area code: 870
- FIPS code: 05-33370
- GNIS feature ID: 2404731
- Website: cityofhorseshoebend.wordpress.com

Horseshoe Bend is a city in Fulton, Izard, and Sharp counties in the U.S. state of Arkansas. As of the 2020 census, Horseshoe Bend had a population of 2,440. It is named for the large loop or horseshoe bend in the nearby Strawberry River.

== Geography ==
According to the United States Census Bureau, the city has a total area of 14.6 square miles (38 km^{2}), of which 13.4 square miles (35 km^{2}) is land, and 1.2 square miles (3.1 km^{2}) (8.50%) is water.

== Demographics ==
Historical population
Census	Pop.	Note	%±
1970	321		—
1980	1,909		494.7%
1990	2,239		17.3%
2000	2,278		1.7%
2010	2,184		−4.1%
2020	2,440		11.7%
2025 (est.)	2,623	▲	7.5%
U.S. Decennial Census

=== 2020 census ===
Horseshoe Bend racial composition
Race	Number	Percentage
White (non-Hispanic)	2,181	89.39%
Black or African American (non-Hispanic)	11	0.45%
Native American	17	0.7%
Asian	9	0.37%
Pacific Islander	3	0.12%
Other/Mixed	144	5.9%
Hispanic or Latino	75	3.07%

As of the 2020 census, Horseshoe Bend had a population of 2,440. There were 1,087 households and 616 families in the city.

The median age was 55.5 years. 16.7% of residents were under the age of 18 and 33.8% were 65 years of age or older. For every 100 females, there were 94.4 males, and for every 100 females age 18 and over, there were 94.2 males age 18 and over.

0.0% of residents lived in urban areas, while 100.0% lived in rural areas.

Of all households, 19.1% had children under the age of 18 living in them. 45.1% were married-couple households, 19.5% were households with a male householder and no spouse or partner present, and 28.2% were households with a female householder and no spouse or partner present. About 33.7% of all households were made up of individuals, and 20.1% had someone living alone who was 65 years of age or older.

There were 1,314 housing units, of which 17.3% were vacant. The homeowner vacancy rate was 4.4% and the rental vacancy rate was 12.4%.

=== 2000 census ===
As of the census of 2000, there were 2,278 people, 1,142 households, and 725 families residing in the city. The population density was 170.6 inhabitants per square mile (65.9/km^{2}). There were 1,451 housing units at an average density of 108.7 per square mile (42.0/km^{2}). The racial makeup of the city was 97.28% White, 0.22% Black or African American, 0.88% Native American, 0.13% Asian, 0.04% Pacific Islander, 0.40% from other races, and 1.05% from two or more races. 1.23% of the population were Hispanic or Latino of any race.

There were 1,142 households, out of which 11.6% had children under the age of 18 living with them, 56.7% were married couples living together, 4.6% had a female householder with no husband present, and 36.5% were non-families. 33.8% of all households were made up of individuals, and 24.3% had someone living alone who was 65 years of age or older. The average household size was 1.95 and the average family size was 2.42.

In the city, the population was spread out, with 12.8% under the age of 18, 3.4% from 18 to 24, 13.5% from 25 to 44, 24.6% from 45 to 64, and 45.7% who were 65 years of age or older. The median age was 63 years. For every 100 females, there were 86.9 males. For every 100 females age 18 and over, there were 84.2 males.

The median income for a household in the city was $26,714, and the median income for a family was $34,129. Males had a median income of $24,286 versus $17,688 for females. The per capita income for the city was $18,987. About 6.9% of families and 10.8% of the population were below the poverty line, including 26.7% of those under age 18 and 2.6% of those age 65 or over.

== Government ==
=== City government ===
City government is a mayor-council government. It consists of a mayor and eight council members representing four wards.

=== City Court ===
The City Court has jurisdiction over misdemeanor, criminal, traffic and municipal ordinance violations and cases that occur within the city.

== Municipal services ==
=== Police ===
The Horseshoe Bend Police Department was disbanded in 2013, its duties assumed by the Izard County Sheriff's office.

=== Fire ===
The Horseshoe Bend Volunteer Fire Department consists of 12 volunteers and covers 45 square miles of residential and commercial properties as well as wetlands. The Department is responsible for fire suppression, extrication assistance, HAZMAT, and rescue. Equipment includes one engine / pumper, one tanker, one brush / quick-attack vehicle, and one emergency rescue vehicle. The department currently has an Insurance Services Office, Inc. (ISO) Public Protection Classification (PPC™) Service rating of 6.

=== Animal Control ===
Animal Control maintains a facility where lost dogs and cats are kept for adoption. It is staffed by employees and volunteers. A five-day waiting period is observed with the hopes that the pet will be reunited with its owner. Animals must be spayed / neutered and vaccinated prior to adoption. Assistance with these fees is available through the Friends of Horseshoe Bend Animals.

=== Library ===
The Horseshoe Bend Library was created in 1974, evolving from bookmobile service from the White Country Regional Library in Batesville, Arkansas that began in 1970. The library was originally housed in the Municipal Building. In 2006, the Library relocated to its new facility on Club Rd. The Library serves the city and surrounding area with services such as audio / visual equipment, computer and Internet access, a media / meeting room, and traditional reading materials. The library is supported by Friends of the Library. Library grounds are maintained by Izard Country Master Gardeners.

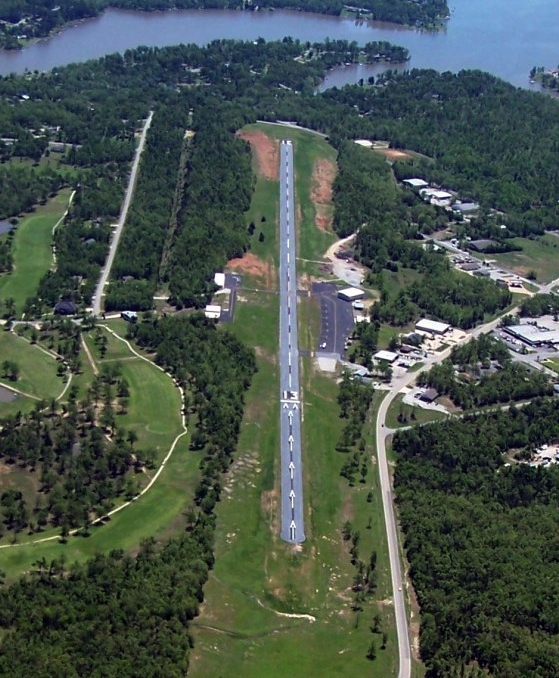
Horseshoe Bend Airport, April 2011

== Transportation ==
=== Major highways ===
- Arkansas Highway 289
- Arkansas Highway 354

=== Airport ===
The Horseshoe Bend Airport, FAA identifier is 6M2, is owned and operated by the city. The runway is 4,524 ft. x 60 ft. and is paved. It is located at 36°13′3″N 91°45′3″W (36.2213694, -91.7554833) at an elevation of 782 ft. / 238 m. Its variation is 03E.

== See also ==
- List of cities in Arkansas
