= Spring River (Arkansas) =

River in Arkansas, United States

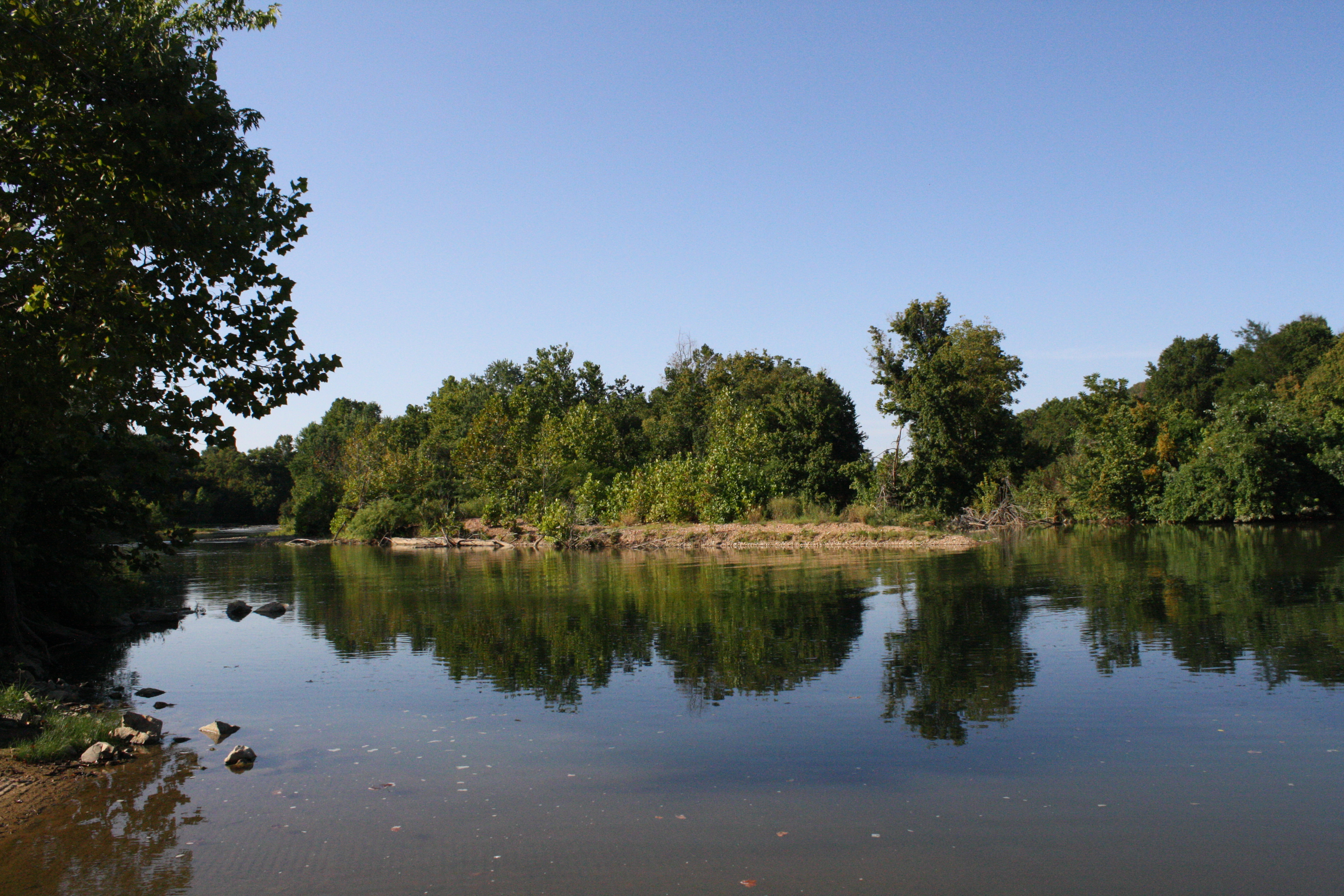
- LB Access, Sharp County

Location
- Country: United States
- States: Arkansas, Missouri

Physical characteristics
- Source
  - location: Mammoth Spring
  - coordinates: 36°29′42″N 91°32′06″W
  - elevation: 490 ft (150 m)
- Mouth
  - location: Black River
  - coordinates: 36°06′53″N 91°04′26″W
  - elevation: 236 ft (72 m)
- Length: 57 mi (92 km)
- Discharge
  - location: below the mouth of the Eleven Point River
  - average: 2,599 cu/ft. per sec.
- Discharge
  - location: Imboden, Arkansas
  - average: 1,428 cu/ft. per sec.

The Spring River is a 57-mile (92 km) long river which flows through Arkansas, United States.

== Description ==
The river has a branch, the South Fork of the Spring River, which extends into Howell County, Missouri. The South Fork of the Spring River joins the Spring River proper near the town of Hardy. The South Fork is a quiet stream with gravelly bars that are ideal for camping.

The Spring River proper begins where Mammoth Spring and Warm Fork of the Spring River merge at Mammoth Spring State Park in Mammoth Spring, Arkansas. Mammoth Spring is the outlet of an underground river that runs from Missouri into Arkansas. Over 9.78 million US gallons (37,000 m^{3}) per hour flow out of the massive spring and forms the Spring River. Being predominantly spring fed with water averaging 58 °F (14 °C), the river is kept cool during warmer months and is suitable trout habitate for several miles.

The spring river also has two dams formally 3 built around 1880 for industrial use dam site 2 was washed out during a storm in 1915 with dam site 1 and 3 still being around.

The Spring River proper is a popular destination for tourists, canoers, and for riding inner tubes ("toobers"). The most popular stretch of the river is between Mammoth Spring and the tourist town of Hardy. Below Hardy, the Spring River flows past Ravenden and Imoden to its confluence with the Eleven Point River near Old Davidsonville State Park. The Spring River joins the Black River near Black Rock, Arkansas. There are a variety of outfitters along the river who provide supplies, canoe rental, and shuttle services in the area between Mammoth Spring and Hardy. Several resorts provide lodging for tourists.

The Spring River has a diverse population of fish including trout, walleye, largemouth and smallmouth bass, channel catfish, redear sunfish, and tiger muskies. A state record tiger muskie weighing 23 lb 12 oz (10.8 kg) was caught in the river in 1995. The Arkansas Game and Fish Commission maintains a trout hatchery on the river and the United States Fish and Wildlife Service operates another on the river near Mammoth Spring.

== Flooding ==
In March 2008, a vigorous, slow moving low pressure system moved out of Texas and into Arkansas inundating the area with over a foot of rain falling in some areas of Arkansas and Missouri. Heavy rainfall rates caused the river to over flow its banks with an observed maximum depth of 22.29 feet (6.79 m). This river level had only been surpassed by the record 1982 floods that reached a level of 29 feet. The mayor of Hardy ordered evacuation of 250 citizens of the town because of dangerous river levels that flooded over 100 buildings in and around the Spring River.

== See also ==
- List of Arkansas rivers
