= Camp, Arkansas =

- Unincorporated community
- Location within Arkansas Location within the United States
- Coordinates: 36°24′51″N 91°44′06″W
- Country: United States
- State: Arkansas
- County: Fulton
- Elevation: 623 ft (190 m)
- Time zone: UTC-6 (Central (CST))
  - Summer (DST): UTC-5 (CDT)
- ZIP code: 72520
- Area code: 870
- GNIS feature ID: 47305

Camp is an unincorporated community in Fulton County, Arkansas, United States. Camp is located on Arkansas Highway 9, approximately six miles northeast of Salem. Camp Creek is a very small creek at its deepest point is 3 1/2 feet that flows past the community.

Camp has a post office with ZIP code 72520.

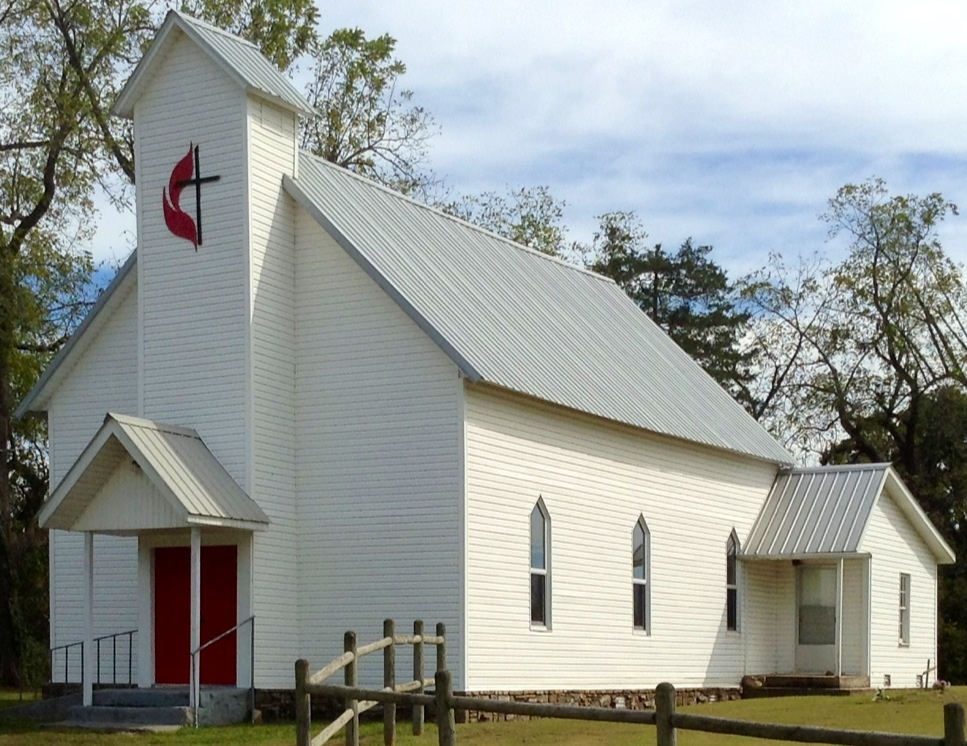
Camp Methodist Church
