= Gepp, Arkansas =

- Unincorporated community
- Location within Arkansas Location within the United States
- Coordinates: 36°23′16″N 92°06′16″W
- Country: United States
- State: Arkansas
- County: Fulton
- Elevation: 764 ft (233 m)
- Time zone: UTC-6 (Central (CST))
  - Summer (DST): UTC-5 (CDT)
- ZIP code: 72538
- Area code: 870
- GNIS feature ID: 57538

Gepp (/dʒiːp/ JEEP) is an unincorporated community in western Fulton County, Arkansas, United States. Gepp is located along U.S. Routes 62 and 412, 7 miles (11 km) west of Viola. Gepp has a post office with ZIP code 72538.
