= Salem, Fulton County, Arkansas =

Salem, Arkansas
- City
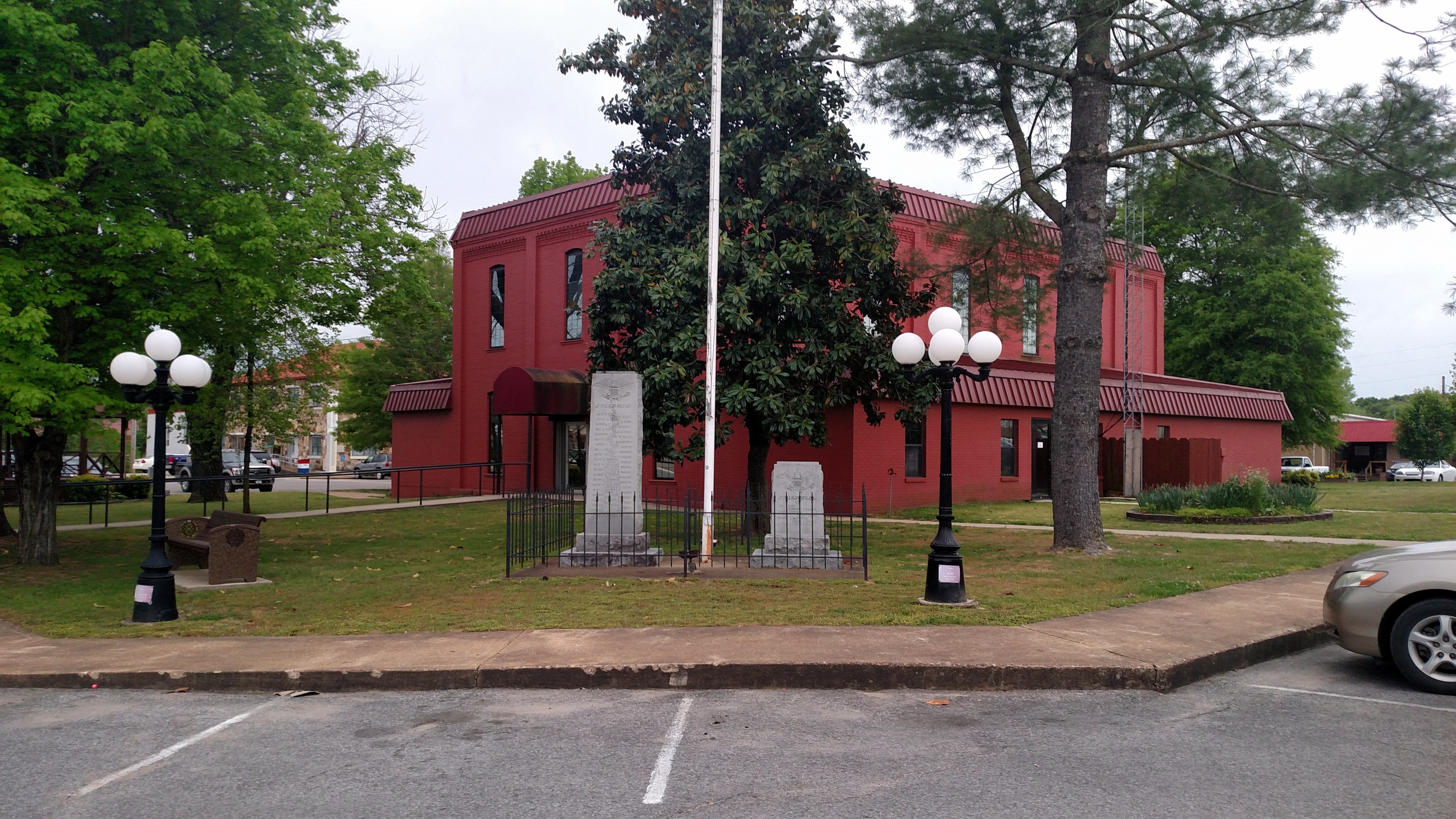
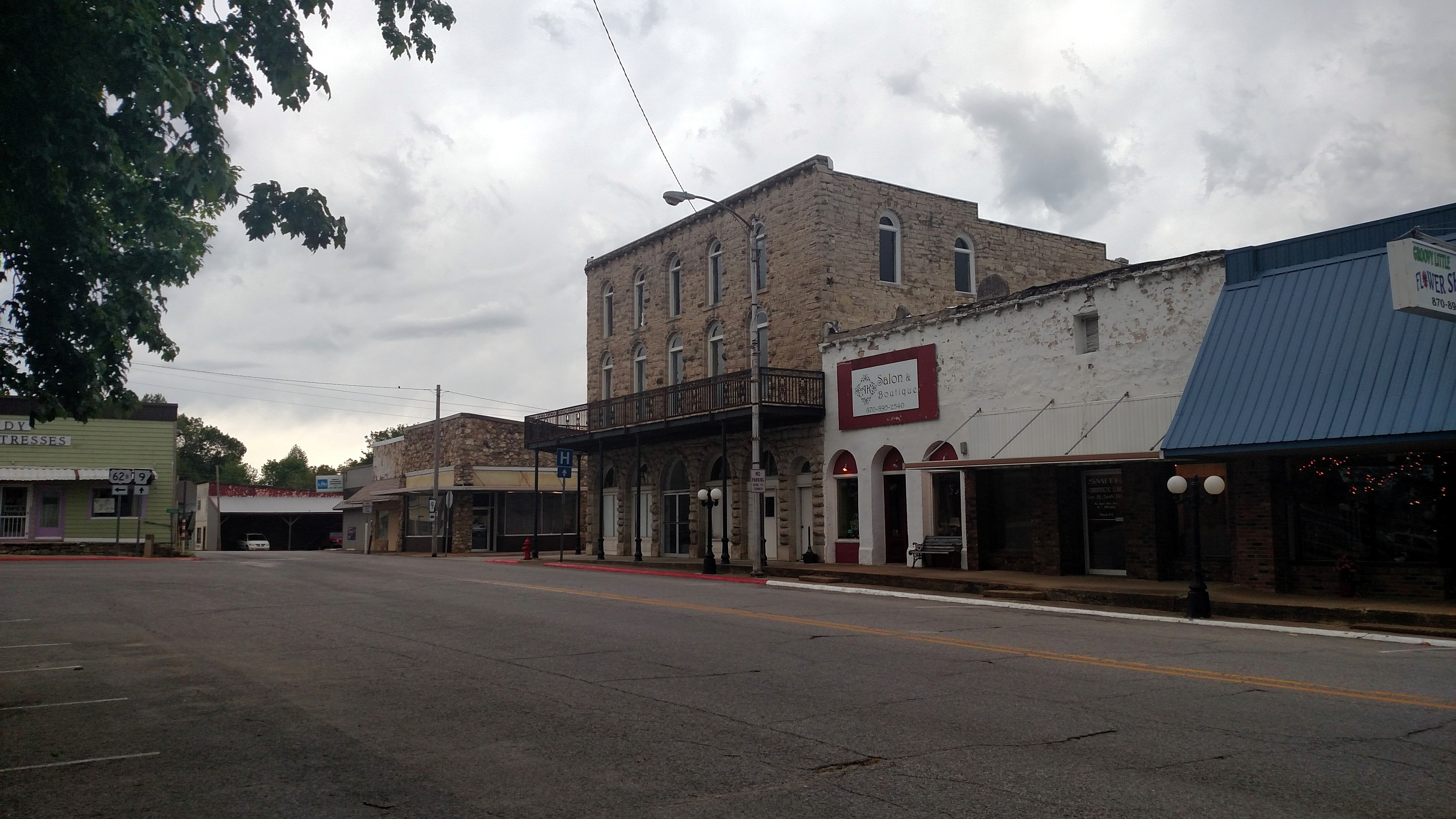
- The Fulton County Courthouse (top) and downtown Salem

- Location of Salem in Fulton County, Arkansas.
- Coordinates: 36°22′14″N 91°49′26″W
- Country: United States
- State: Arkansas
- County: Fulton

Area
  - Total: 2.41 sq mi (6.25 km^{2})
  - Land: 2.41 sq mi (6.25 km^{2})
  - Water: 0 sq mi (0.00 km^{2})
- Elevation: 656 ft (200 m)

Population (2020)
  - Total: 1,566
  - Estimate (2025): 1,611 ▲
  - Density: 649.4/sq mi (250.72/km^{2})
- Time zone: UTC-6 (Central (CST))
  - Summer (DST): UTC-5 (CDT)
- ZIP code: 72576
- Area code: 870
- FIPS code: 05-62150
- GNIS feature ID: 2405404

Salem is a city in and the county seat of Fulton County, Arkansas, United States. Salem was first incorporated in 1900. As of the 2020 census the population stood at 1,566.

== Geography ==
Salem is located near the center of Fulton County at the intersection of US Route 62 and 412 with Arkansas Highways 9 and 395.

According to the United States Census Bureau, the city has a total area of 3.7 square miles (9.6 km^{2}), of which 0.02 square miles (0.04 km^{2}), or 0.38%, is water.

=== Climate ===
Salem has a humid subtropical climate with mild winters and hot summers. November has the highest average precipitation, at 5.17 inches (131 mm). The average annual rainfall is 47 inches (1,200 mm). The average annual low temperature is 44 degrees and the average annual high is 67.

Climate data for Salem, Fulton County, Arkansas (1991–2020)
Month	Jan	Feb	Mar	Apr	May	Jun	Jul	Aug	Sep	Oct	Nov	Dec	Year
Mean daily maximum °F (°C)	45.8 (7.7)	50.4 (10.2)	60.3 (15.7)	70.3 (21.3)	77.3 (25.2)	86.0 (30.0)	89.6 (32.0)	89.2 (31.8)	81.7 (27.6)	70.5 (21.4)	58.4 (14.7)	47.9 (8.8)	69.0 (20.5)
Daily mean °F (°C)	35.3 (1.8)	39.0 (3.9)	47.8 (8.8)	57.5 (14.2)	65.9 (18.8)	74.8 (23.8)	78.7 (25.9)	77.8 (25.4)	70.0 (21.1)	58.5 (14.7)	46.8 (8.2)	37.7 (3.2)	57.5 (14.1)
Mean daily minimum °F (°C)	24.8 (−4.0)	27.7 (−2.4)	35.4 (1.9)	44.8 (7.1)	54.5 (12.5)	63.6 (17.6)	67.7 (19.8)	66.4 (19.1)	58.3 (14.6)	46.5 (8.1)	35.3 (1.8)	27.5 (−2.5)	46.0 (7.8)
Average precipitation inches (mm)	3.41 (87)	3.61 (92)	4.90 (124)	5.32 (135)	5.07 (129)	3.44 (87)	4.21 (107)	3.45 (88)	3.94 (100)	3.73 (95)	4.70 (119)	3.77 (96)	49.55 (1,259)
Average snowfall inches (cm)	1.6 (4.1)	1.0 (2.5)	1.4 (3.6)	0.0 (0.0)	0.0 (0.0)	0.0 (0.0)	0.0 (0.0)	0.0 (0.0)	0.0 (0.0)	0.0 (0.0)	0.1 (0.25)	0.7 (1.8)	4.8 (12.25)
Source: NOAA

=== Protected areas ===
Salem City Park has a walking trail, volleyball court, picnic pavilions, children's play area, and a lake that is stocked with fish. Preacher Roe Park is located on Highway 9 and offers a baseball/softball field and basketball court for aspiring athletes of all ages.

Mammoth Spring State Park is roughly 16 miles (26 km) northeast of Salem.

Lake Norfork is a short drive away, and it offers water skiing, swimming, fishing, and boating opportunities. The lake offers excellent striped bass fishing, with some of these monster fish weighing over 50 pounds. The lake is also good for largemouth, smallmouth and Kentucky bass fishing, and the bays and ponds are loaded with fast-biting bream and other panfish.

Wildlife abounds, and the area is popular for deer and turkey hunting; experienced hunters can quickly achieve their bag limit, and novice hunters usually return with some interesting stories.

== Demographics ==
Historical population
Census	Pop.	Note	%±
1880	86		—
1930	481		—
1940	574		19.3%
1950	687		19.7%
1960	713		3.8%
1970	1,277		79.1%
1980	1,424		11.5%
1990	1,474		3.5%
2000	1,591		7.9%
2010	1,635		2.8%
2020	1,566		−4.2%
2025 (est.)	1,611	▲	2.9%
U.S. Decennial Census

=== 2020 census ===
Salem racial composition
Race	Number	Percentage
White (non-Hispanic)	1,416	90.42%
Black or African American (non-Hispanic)	9	0.57%
Native American	7	0.45%
Asian	2	0.13%
Other/Mixed	108	6.9%
Hispanic or Latino	24	1.53%

As of the 2020 United States census, there were 1,566 people, 818 households, and 451 families residing in the city.

=== 2000 census ===
As of the census of 2000, there were 1,591 people, 679 households, and 412 families residing in the city. The population density was 586.4 inhabitants per square mile (226.4/km^{2}). There were 781 housing units at an average density of 287.9 units per square mile (111.2 units/km^{2}). The racial makeup of the city was 97.42% White, 0.31% Black or African American, 0.31% Native American, 0.31% Asian, and 1.63% from two or more races. 0.50% of the population were Hispanic or Latino of any race.

There were 679 households, out of which 27.1% had children under the age of 18 living with them, 46.4% were married couples living together, 11.8% had a female householder with no husband present, and 39.3% were non-families. 37.0% of all households were made up of individuals, and 21.8% had someone living alone who was 65 years of age or older. The average household size was 2.22 and the average family size was 2.92.

In the city, the population was spread out, with 23.4% under the age of 18, 7.9% from 18 to 24, 23.6% from 25 to 44, 19.2% from 45 to 64, and 26.0% who were 65 years of age or older. The median age was 41 years. For every 100 females, there were 81.4 males. For every 100 females age 18 and over, there were 73.6 males.

The median income for a household in the city was $20,714, and the median income for a family was $28,359. Males had a median income of $22,368 versus $17,356 for females. The per capita income for the city was $12,891. About 17.8% of families and 21.8% of the population were below the poverty line, including 27.7% of those under age 18 and 20.8% of those age 65 or over.

== Government ==
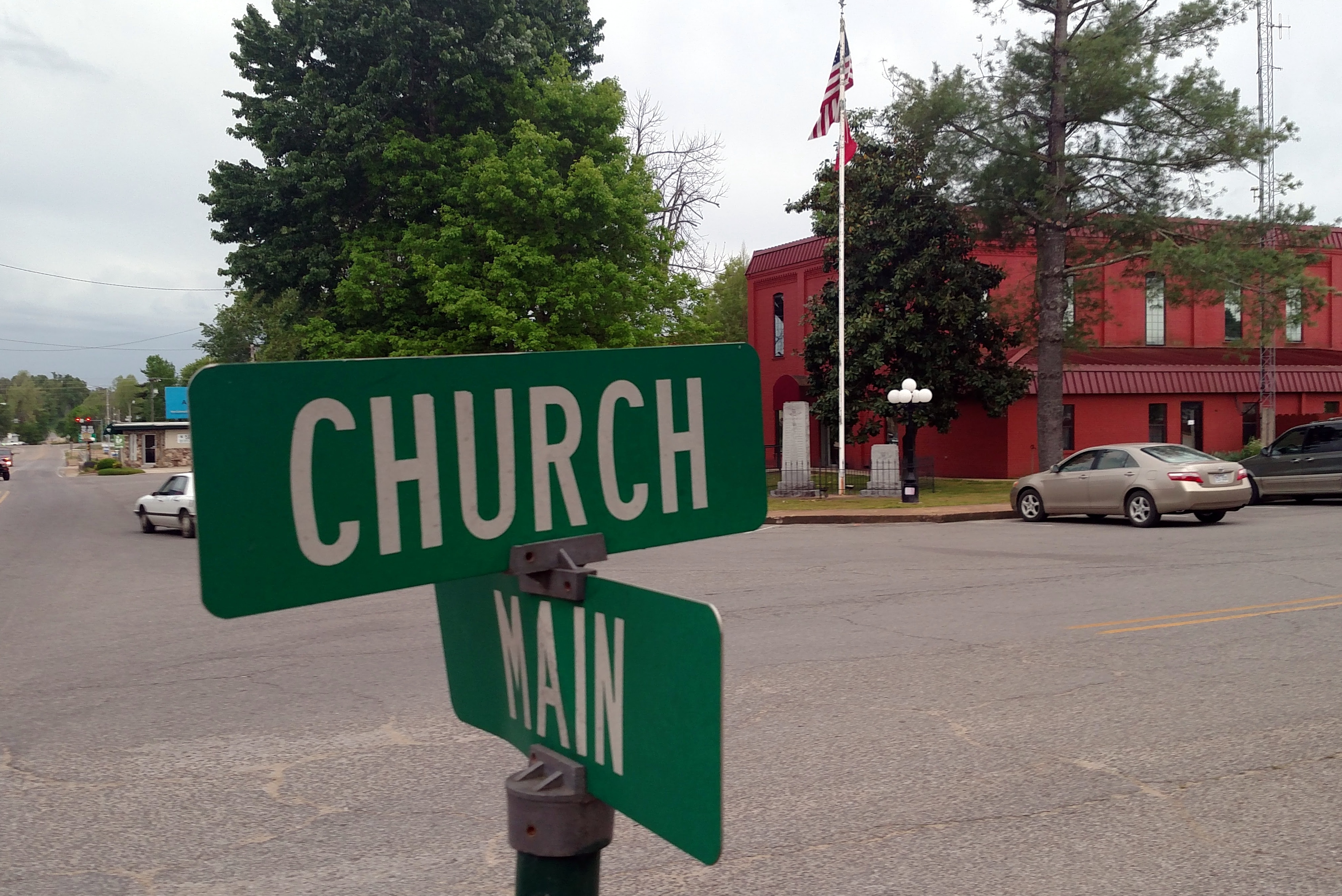
US 62B (Church Street) ends at Highway 9 (Main Street) in downtown Salem

Salem operates within the mayor-city council form of government. The mayor is elected by a citywide election to serve as the chief executive officer (CEO) of the city by presiding over all city functions and allocating duties to city employees. The Salem mayoral election coincides with the election of the President of the United States. Mayors serve four-year terms and can serve unlimited terms. The city council is the unicameral legislature, consisting of four council members. Also included in the council's duties is balancing the city's budget and passing ordinances.

== Human resources ==
=== Education ===
==== Primary and secondary education ====
The Salem School District has two campuses: Salem Elementary School (K–6) and Salem High School (7–12) with 700-plus district enrollment.

==== Higher education ====
Three public two-year colleges are located in adjoining counties. Ozarka College is located at Melbourne in Izard County with a satellite campus at Ash Flat in Sharp County. Arkansas State University–Mountain Home is in Baxter County and Missouri State University–West Plains in West Plains, Missouri. Many Salem High graduates choose to attend the larger universities Arkansas State University in Jonesboro, or University of Arkansas in Fayetteville.

==== Libraries ====
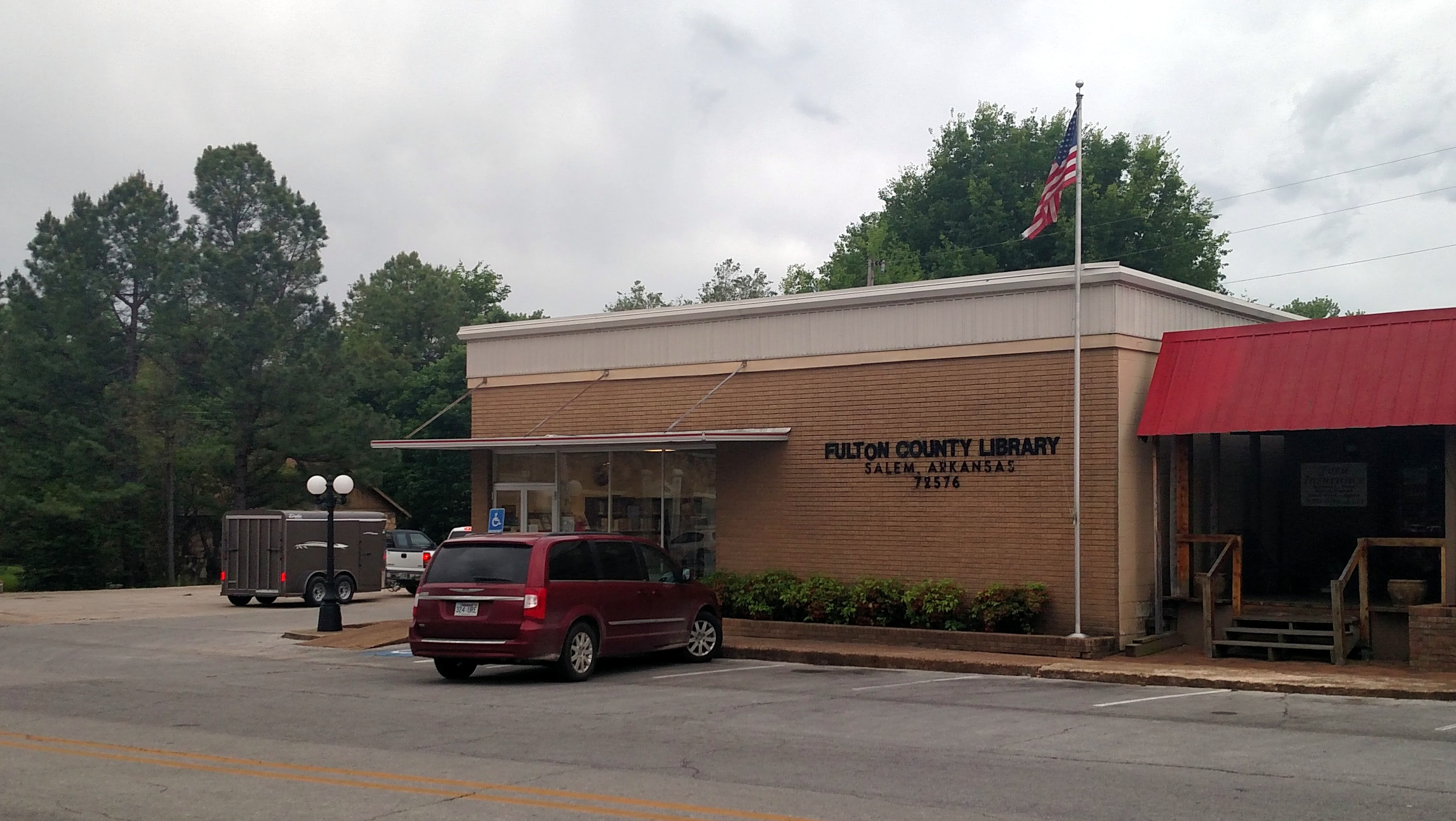
Fulton County Library

The Fulton County Library is located at 205 Pickens in Salem. It is part of the White River Regional Library System.

=== Public health ===
Fulton County Hospital is an acute hospital certified by CMS and licensed by the state as a 25-bed critical access hospital. The hospital provides 24-hour emergency service and general diagnostic testing including clinical laboratory testing, general x-ray and CT. Ultrasound and MRI are provided on a scheduled basis. Fulton County Hospital has an active (admitting) staff of six physicians. Four of the physicians specialize in family practice and two are internists. The consulting staff consists of 18 physicians in the specialties of Diagnostic Radiology, Caridology, ENT and Pathology.

Five Family Medical Clinics serve Salem with one clinic in Mammoth Spring in the north east section of Fulton County. Salem also has four Pharmacies. Four agencies offer Home Health Services. The community has one Nursing and Rehabilitation Center and one Assisted Living Facility.

Fulton County Hospital operates a Paramedic Ambulance Service and an Air Ambulance Service is based in an adjoining county.

== Culture and contemporary life ==
Smallmouth bass fishing and canoeing exist in the nearby South Fork of the Spring River. It is also not far to White River, nationally known for its big rainbow and brown trout, or to Spring River and the Strawberry River. Both the Spring and Strawberry are excellent float streams, with the added bonus of rainbow trout and walleye in Spring River, and the smallmouth bass, crappie and bream in the Strawberry River. The Spring river boasts some popular canoe rental and tourist companies which facilitate impromptu weekend canoe or camping trips.

The landscape is especially beautiful during the fall, and the focal overlooking hill, the Salem Knob (historically a public park, now privately owned) and surrounding area offers many photographic opportunities.

=== Annual cultural events ===
The area has a culture rich in originating the bluegrass music tradition, and each year boasts the Fulton County Homecoming event that allows local and visiting artists to gather and perform on the town square.

Mammoth Spring State Park hosts an annual Old Soldiers Reunion, which originated as a way to celebrate the reunification of the Confederacy with the Union following the Civil War. Now, the Reunion is a fair-like event that offers entertaining Civil War Re-enactments, rides, games, traditional bluegrass and other varieties of music entertainment for a three- or four-day period annually.

During the annual Fulton County Fair, there is a public area behind the Salem City Park which hosts rodeos, tractor pulls, livestock shows, concerts, rides and games.

== Infrastructure ==
=== Major highways ===
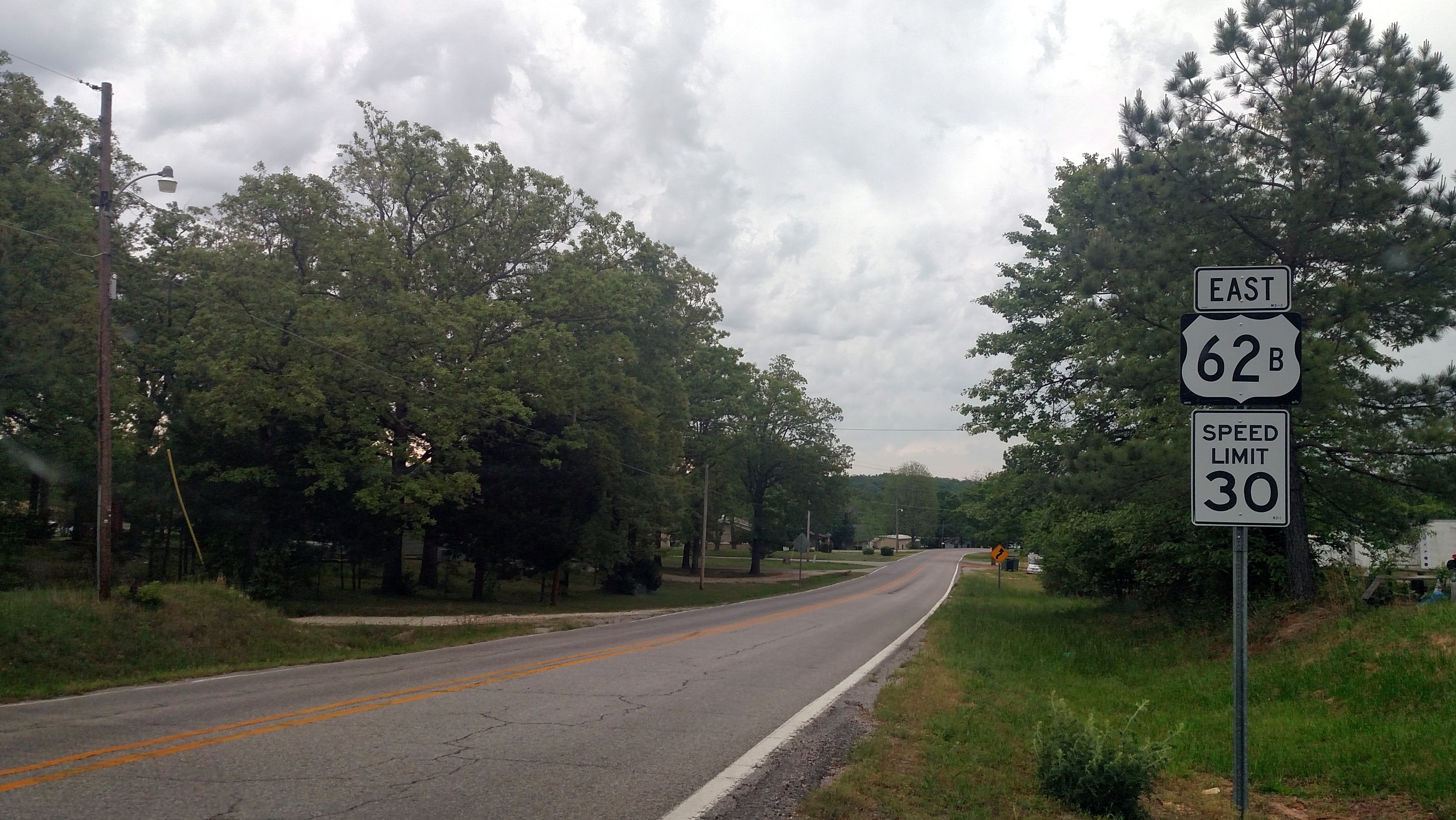
US 62B in Salem

U.S. Routes 62/412 pass through the south side of the city, leading southeast 18 miles (29 km) to Ash Flat and west 36 miles (58 km) to Mountain Home. Arkansas Highway 9 passes through the center of town, leading northeast 19 miles (31 km) to Mammoth Spring and southwest 50 miles (80 km) to Mountain View.

=== Utilities ===
Electricity is provided by the North Arkansas Electric Cooperative, which is based in Salem.
