= Mammoth Spring, Arkansas =

- City
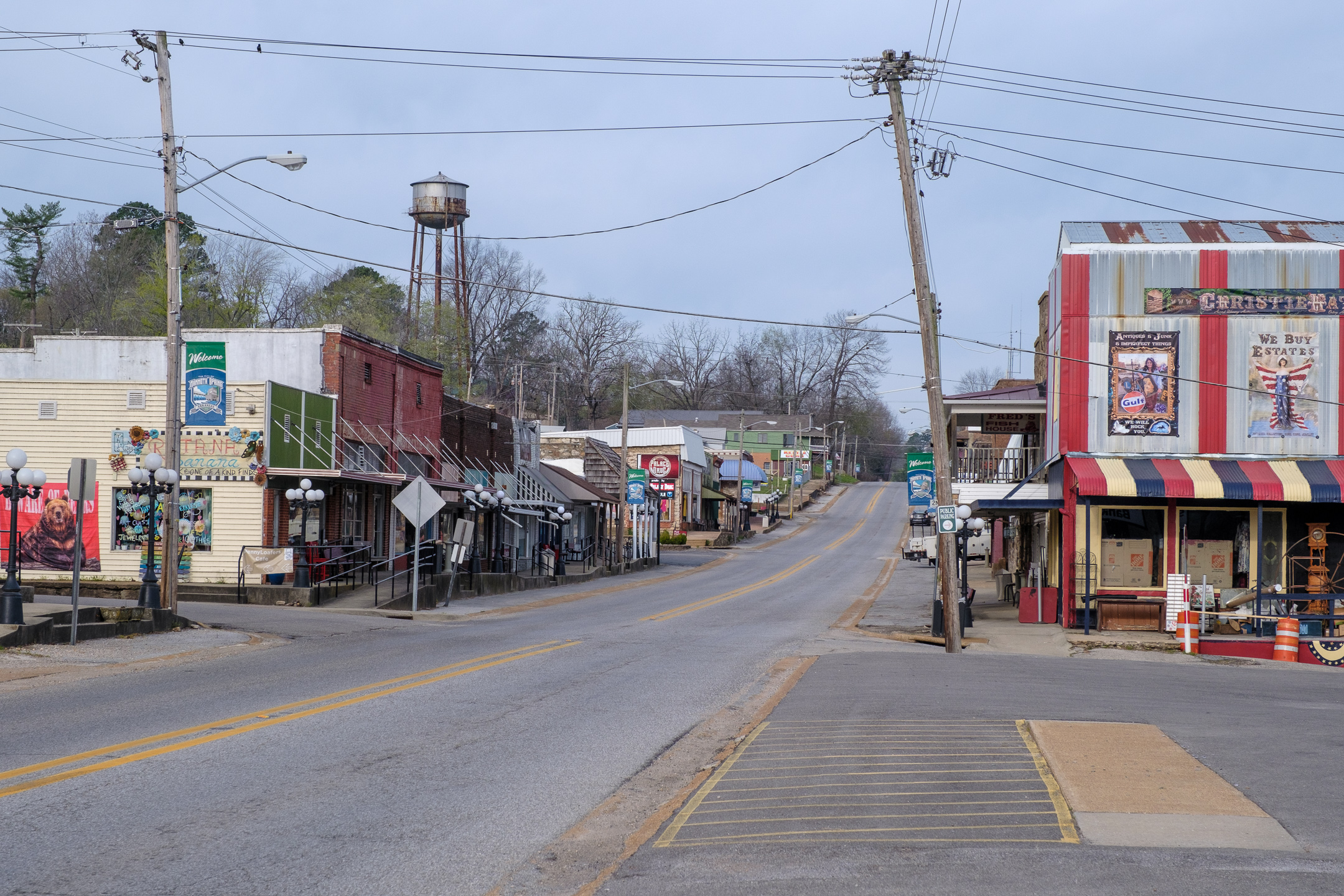
- Main Street

- Location of Mammoth Spring in Fulton County, Arkansas.
- Coordinates: 36°29′33″N 91°32′29″W
- Country: United States
- State: Arkansas
- County: Fulton

Area
  - Total: 1.34 sq mi (3.47 km^{2})
  - Land: 1.29 sq mi (3.35 km^{2})
  - Water: 0.046 sq mi (0.12 km^{2})
- Elevation: 568 ft (173 m)

Population (2020)
  - Total: 929
  - Estimate (2025): 941 ▲
  - Density: 719.2/sq mi (277.68/km^{2})
- Time zone: UTC−06:00 (Central (CST))
  - Summer (DST): UTC−05:00 (CDT)
- ZIP Code: 72554
- Area code: 870
- FIPS code: 05-43670
- GNIS feature ID: 2405002

Mammoth Spring is a city in Fulton County, Arkansas. The population was 929 at the time of the 2020 census and is home to Mammoth Spring, one of the largest natural springs in the world. The location is renowned for its trout fishing.

== History ==
The original village site was established in Missouri, near what was called the Harry Turnstall spring, now known as “Old Town.” Despite homesteading efforts by early settlers in the region, the spring was divided into multiple plots. It wasn't until the arrival of the Frisco Railroad in 1883, which extended its track from Springfield, Missouri, to Memphis, Tennessee, and established a station and depot between the spring and the Spring River, that the town shifted to the Arkansas side of the river.

In 1890, Mammoth Spring was promoted to Memphis investors as an excellent site for construction of major manufacturing operations. At that time the town was home to an upscale resort hotel, The Nettleton, said to rival other hotels in Eureka Springs, Arkansas. The Nettleton was built by Memphis millionaire Napoleon Hill and operated from 1899 to 1932, when it was destroyed by fire. In 1927, Mammoth Spring became the first town in the region to have electricity, powered by the dams constructed by the Mammoth Spring Improvement Company.

In 1968, the Frisco Railroad discontinued passenger service altogether and the train depot was converted into a museum, an extension of Mammoth Spring State Park. The depot was restored in 1971 and listed on the National Register of Historic Places in 1992.

=== Grand Ole Opry connection ===
Mammoth Spring is credited with providing the original inspiration to George D. Hay to create what became the Grand Ole Opry in Nashville. Hay was sent on a reporting assignment to Mammoth Spring in 1919 when he was invited to a hoedown in a local cabin. There, a fiddle player, a guitar player, and a banjo player performed until dawn. Hay was impressed, and that planted the seed for his later efforts.

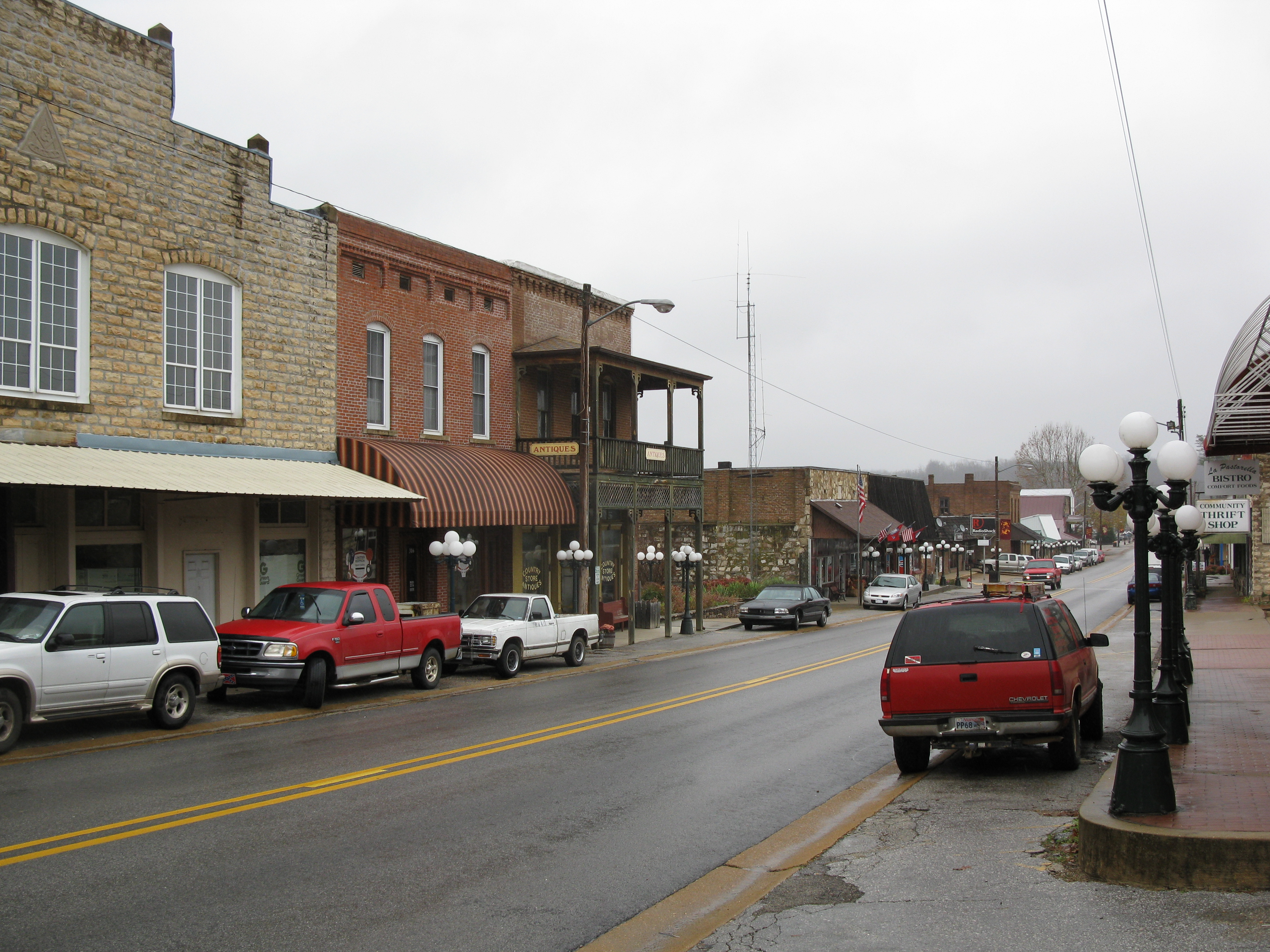
Mammoth Spring in 2009

== Geography ==
According to the United States Census Bureau, the city has a total area of 1.4 square miles (3.6 km^{2}), of which 1.4 square miles (3.6 km^{2}) is land and 0.04 square miles (0.10 km^{2}) (2.86%) is water.

=== Climate ===
The climate in this area is characterized by hot, humid summers and generally mild-to-cool winters. According to the Köppen Climate Classification system, Mammoth Spring has a humid subtropical climate, abbreviated "Cfa" on climate maps.

Climate data for Mammoth Spring, Arkansas (1991–2020 normals, extremes 1904–present)
Month	Jan	Feb	Mar	Apr	May	Jun	Jul	Aug	Sep	Oct	Nov	Dec	Year
Record high °F (°C)	79 (26)	89 (32)	97 (36)	95 (35)	99 (37)	108 (42)	110 (43)	109 (43)	109 (43)	96 (36)	87 (31)	80 (27)	110 (43)
Mean maximum °F (°C)	68.6 (20.3)	73.4 (23.0)	80.9 (27.2)	85.0 (29.4)	88.9 (31.6)	93.8 (34.3)	97.9 (36.6)	98.2 (36.8)	93.4 (34.1)	86.4 (30.2)	76.9 (24.9)	68.9 (20.5)	99.9 (37.7)
Mean daily maximum °F (°C)	46.8 (8.2)	51.5 (10.8)	60.8 (16.0)	70.7 (21.5)	78.2 (25.7)	86.2 (30.1)	90.3 (32.4)	89.6 (32.0)	82.4 (28.0)	72.3 (22.4)	60.0 (15.6)	49.8 (9.9)	69.9 (21.1)
Daily mean °F (°C)	34.8 (1.6)	39.0 (3.9)	48.0 (8.9)	57.4 (14.1)	66.1 (18.9)	74.4 (23.6)	78.4 (25.8)	77.2 (25.1)	69.5 (20.8)	58.2 (14.6)	47.1 (8.4)	38.2 (3.4)	57.4 (14.1)
Mean daily minimum °F (°C)	22.8 (−5.1)	26.5 (−3.1)	35.3 (1.8)	44.0 (6.7)	54.0 (12.2)	62.7 (17.1)	66.4 (19.1)	64.8 (18.2)	56.7 (13.7)	44.2 (6.8)	34.1 (1.2)	26.5 (−3.1)	44.8 (7.1)
Mean minimum °F (°C)	6.5 (−14.2)	10.3 (−12.1)	17.6 (−8.0)	28.8 (−1.8)	38.6 (3.7)	50.5 (10.3)	57.1 (13.9)	54.6 (12.6)	41.6 (5.3)	28.9 (−1.7)	19.2 (−7.1)	11.7 (−11.3)	3.8 (−15.7)
Record low °F (°C)	−23 (−31)	−24 (−31)	1 (−17)	19 (−7)	28 (−2)	35 (2)	45 (7)	40 (4)	30 (−1)	15 (−9)	2 (−17)	−21 (−29)	−24 (−31)
Average precipitation inches (mm)	3.56 (90)	3.48 (88)	4.62 (117)	5.21 (132)	5.31 (135)	3.34 (85)	3.95 (100)	3.49 (89)	3.64 (92)	3.77 (96)	4.59 (117)	3.79 (96)	48.75 (1,238)
Average precipitation days (≥ 0.01 in)	7.2	7.4	9.2	8.5	9.7	7.7	7.7	7.4	6.3	7.7	7.7	7.7	94.2
Source: NOAA

== Demographics ==
Historical population
Census	Pop.	Note	%±
1900	717		—
1910	817		13.9%
1920	700		−14.3%
1930	600		−14.3%
1940	666		11.0%
1950	870		30.6%
1960	825		−5.2%
1970	1,072		29.9%
1980	1,158		8.0%
1990	1,097		−5.3%
2000	1,147		4.6%
2010	977		−14.8%
2020	929		−4.9%
2025 (est.)	941	▲	1.3%
U.S. Decennial Census

=== 2020 census ===
Mammoth Spring racial composition
Race	Number	Percentage
White (non-Hispanic)	865	93.11%
Black or African American (non-Hispanic)	4	0.43%
Native American	2	0.22%
Asian	1	0.11%
Other/Mixed	45	4.84%
Hispanic or Latino	12	1.29%

As of the 2020 United States census, there were 929 people, 468 households, and 286 families residing in the city.

=== 2010 census ===
At the 2010 census there were 977 people in 460 households, including 350 families, in the city. The population density was 847.1 inhabitants per square mile (327.1/km^{2}). There were 593 housing units at an average density of 437.9 per square mile (169.1/km^{2}). The racial makeup of the city was 96.4% White, 0.9% Black or African American, 0.5% Native American, 0.4% Asian, and 0.2% from two or more races. The percentage of the population of Hispanic or Latino of any race was 0.6%. Of the 509 households 28.1% had children under the age of 18 living with them, 55.6% were married couples living together, 11.2% had a female householder with no husband present, and 31.2% were non-families. 29.3% of households were one person and 17.1% were one person aged 65 or older. The average household size was 2.25 and the average family size was 2.75.

The age distribution was 23.6% under the age of 18, 5.2% from 18 to 24, 23.4% from 25 to 44, 25.6% from 45 to 64, and 22.1% 65 or older. The median age was 43 years. For every 100 females, there were 85.3 males. For every 100 females age 18 and over, there were 82.1 males.

The median household income was $20,588 and the median family income was $26,438. Males had a median income of $18,750 versus $16,328 for females. The per capita income for the city was $12,487. About 13.6% of families and 19.3% of the population were below the poverty line, including 24.3% of those under age 18 and 16.4% of those age 65 or over.

== Notable people ==
- Tess Harper, actress
- James Robinson Risner, United States Air Force brigadier general
- Ashley McBryde, country music singer-songwriter
