= Arkansas Highway 341 =

State highway in Arkansas, United States

Highway 341
- AR 341 highlighted in red

Route information
- Maintained by ArDOT
- Existed: August 25, 1965–present

Section 1
- Length: 26.15 mi (42.08 km)
- South end: AR 14
- North end: AR 5 in Salesville

Section 2
- Length: 1.91 mi (3.07 km)
- South end: AR 5
- North end: Tracy Ferry Road/Rocky Ridge Road

Location
- Country: United States
- State: Arkansas
- Counties: Baxter

Highway system
- Arkansas Highway System; Interstate; US; State; Business; Spurs; Suffixed; Scenic; Heritage
← AR 340	→ AR 342

Highway 341 (AR 341, Ark. 341, and Hwy. 341) is a designation for two north–south state highways in Baxter County. One segment of 26.15 miles (42.08 km) runs from Highway 14 north to Highway 5 in Salesville. A second segment of 1.91 miles (3.07 km) runs northeast from Highway 5 near Briarcliff to Tracy Ferry Road/Rocky Ridge Road near Norfork Lake.

== Route description ==
=== Push Mountain Road ===
Highway 341 begins at Highway 14 east of Big Flat and winds north through the Ozark National Forest. The highway enters the corporate limits of Salesville, where it serves as the southern terminus of Highway 201 before turning east. After running 0.9 miles (1.4 km), the highway terminates at a junction with Highway 5 in Salesville.

=== Tracy Ferry Road ===
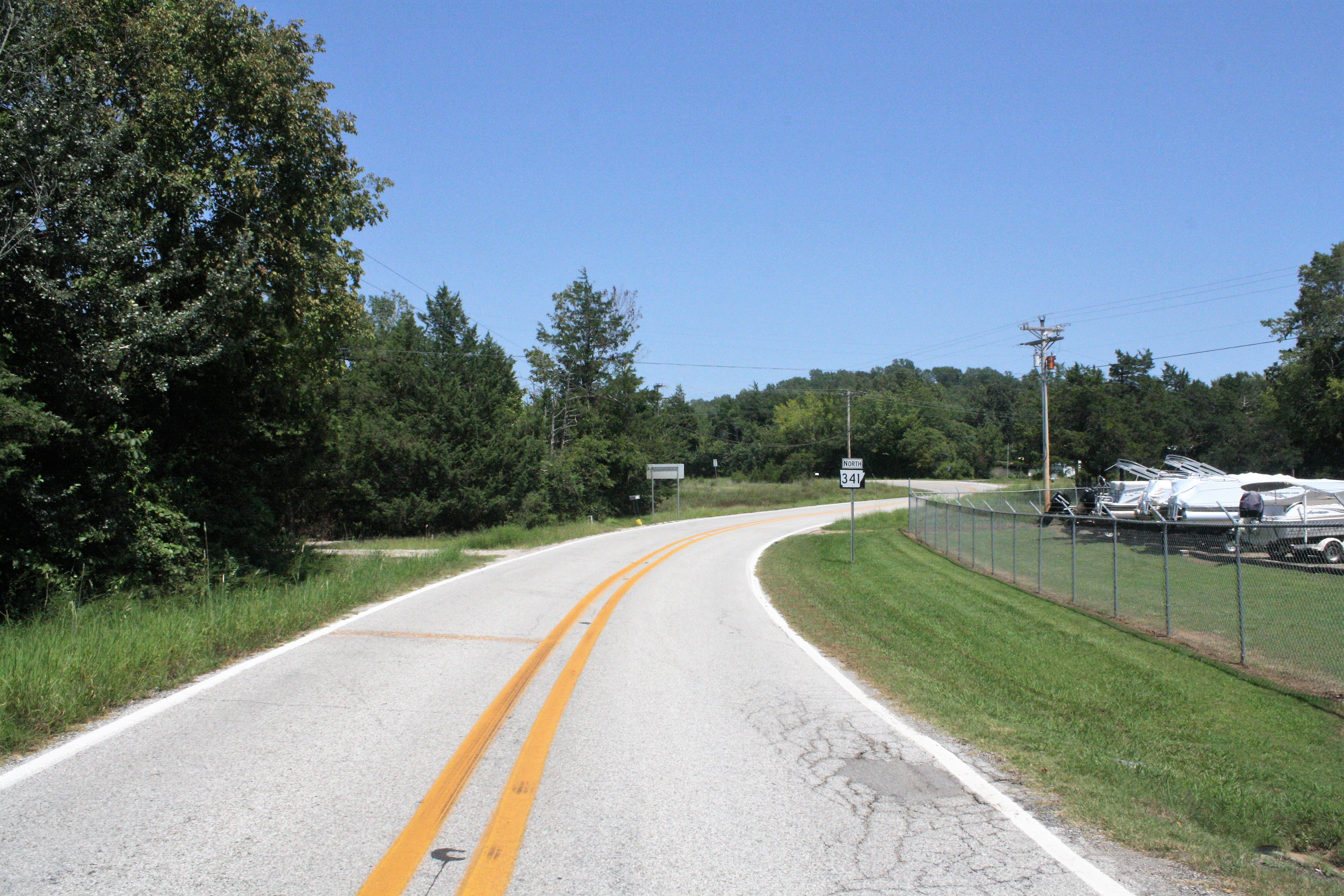
First reassurance marker for Highway 341 north of the Highway 5 junction

Highway 341 begins at Highway 5 north of Briarcliff, Arkansas, and runs northeast through a sparsely populated wooded area. The road is named Tracy Ferry Road and approaches Norfork Lake, where it terminates at Rocky Ridge Road with Tracy Ferry Road splitting and continuing to the southeast.

== History ==
Highway 341 was first added to the state highway system when the segment between Highway 5 and Norfork Lake was added on August 25, 1965. This segment has not undergone any changes since designation.

The second segment of Highway 341 was designated once the Arkansas State Highway Commission learned that the ferry running across the White River at the mouth of the North Fork River near Norfork was going to close, cutting off access to the southern portion of Baxter County. The Commission added the approach roads and ferry to the state highway system on July 26, 1967, following petitions by several Norfork residents and a group appearing before the Commission. A bridge over the White River was commissioned, and the highway was rerouted onto the new bridge on October 25, 1972, matching its present-day alignment in the Norfork area. The route was extended south along Push Mountain Road following a redesign of the highway on April 24, 1973 and extended further on February 27, 1974.

== Major intersections ==
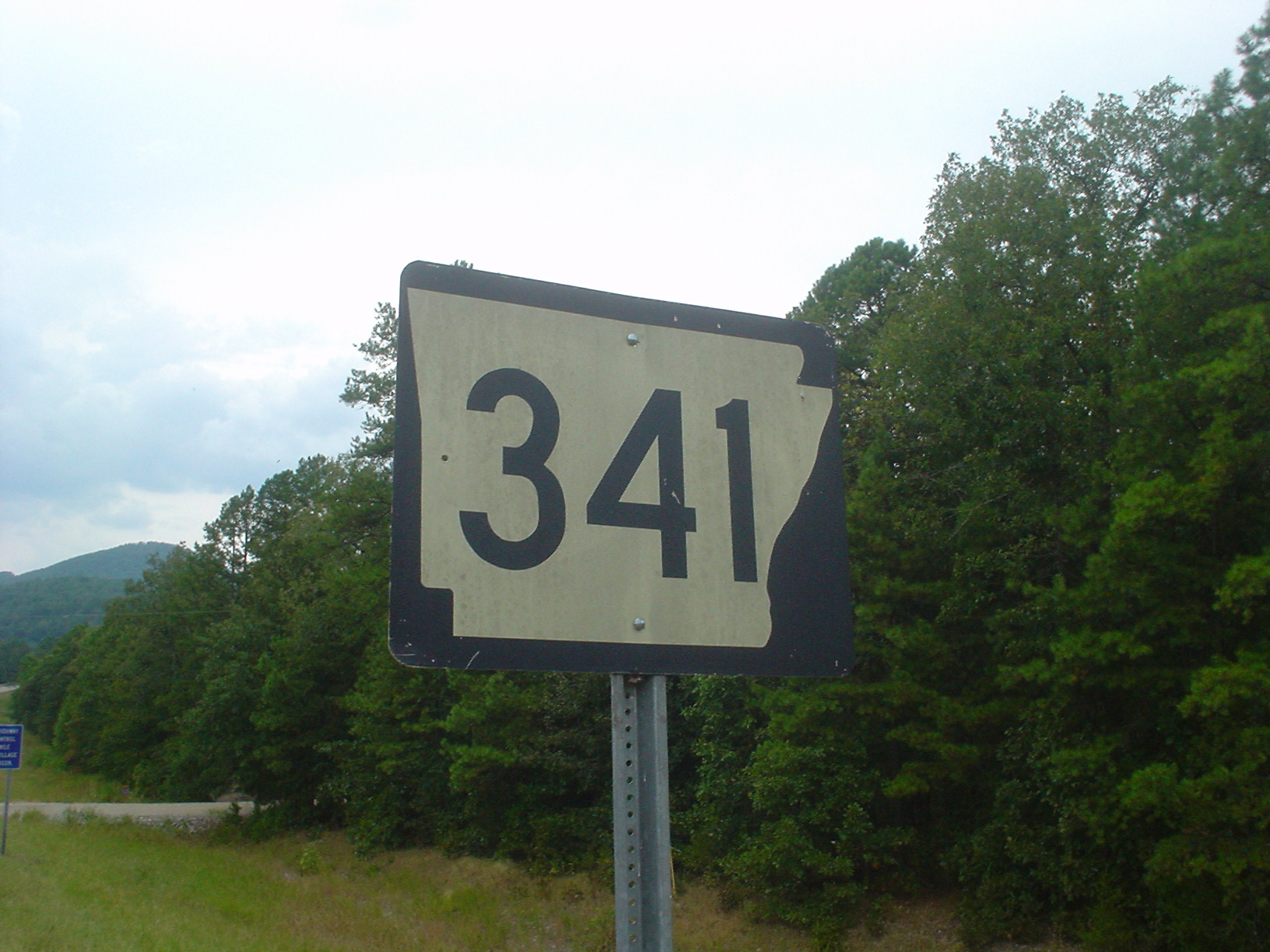
Highway 341 sign in front of a background of steep terrain along Push Mountain Road

The entire route is in Baxter County.

Location	mi	km	Destinations	Notes
	0.00	0.00	AR 14 – Big Flat, Marshall, Fifty-Six, Mountain View	Southern terminus
Norfork	24.70– 24.86	39.75– 40.01	Bridge over White River	
Salesville	25.28	40.68	AR 201 north – Mountain Home	AR 201 southern terminus
Salesville	26.15	42.08	AR 5 – Mountain Home, Calico Rock	Northern terminus
Highway 341 begins near Big Flat
	0.00	0.00	AR 5 – Norfork, Mountain Home	Southern terminus
Sycamore Springs	1.91	3.07	Tracy Ferry Road/Rocky Ridge Road	Northern terminus
1.000 mi = 1.609 km; 1.000 km = 0.621 mi
