= National Register of Historic Places listings in Baxter County, Arkansas =

Location of Baxter County in Arkansas

This is a list of the National Register of Historic Places listings in Baxter County, Arkansas.

This is intended to be a complete list of the properties and districts on the National Register of Historic Places in Baxter County, Arkansas, United States. The locations of National Register properties and districts for which the latitude and longitude coordinates are included below, may be seen in a map.

There are 23 properties and districts listed on the National Register in the county.

Contents: Counties in Arkansas
- Arkansas
- Ashley
- Baxter
- Benton
- Boone
- Bradley
- Calhoun
- Carroll
- Chicot
- Clark
- Clay
- Cleburne
- Cleveland
- Columbia
- Conway
- Craighead
- Crawford
- Crittenden
- Cross
- Dallas
- Desha
- Drew
- Faulkner
- Franklin
- Fulton
- Garland
- Grant
- Greene
- Hempstead
- Hot Spring
- Howard
- Independence
- Izard
- Jackson
- Jefferson
- Johnson
- Lafayette
- Lawrence
- Lee
- Lincoln
- Little River
- Logan
- Lonoke
- Madison
- Marion
- Miller
- Mississippi
- Monroe
- Montgomery
- Nevada
- Newton
- Ouachita
- Perry
- Phillips
- Pike
- Poinsett
- Polk
- Pope
- Prairie
- Pulaski (Little Rock)
- Randolph
- St. Francis
- Saline
- Scott
- Searcy
- Sebastian
- Sevier
- Sharp
- Stone
- Union
- Van Buren
- Washington
- White
- Woodruff
- Yell

This National Park Service list is complete through NPS recent listings posted December 19, 2025.

== Current listings ==
	Name on the Register	Image	Date listed	Location	City or town	Description
1	Baxter County Courthouse	Baxter County Courthouse	May 26, 1995 (#95000658)	Courthouse Sq. 36°20′07″N 92°23′05″W	Mountain Home	
2	Big Flat School Gymnasium	Big Flat School Gymnasium	November 19, 1993 (#93001255)	County Road 121 south of its junction with Highway 14; 36°00′10″N 92°24′17″W	Big Flat	
3	Big Spring		May 5, 2025 (#100011816)	Bull Shoals Road, 0.5 miles (0.80 km) southwest of Powerhouse Road; 36°21′01″N 92°35′29″W	Bull Shoals vicinity	
3	Buford School Building	Buford School Building	September 4, 1992 (#92001128)	Highway 126; 36°14′55″N 92°25′38″W	Buford	
4	Case-Shiras-Dearmore House	Case-Shiras-Dearmore House	February 3, 1992 (#91000580)	351 E. 4th St. 36°20′13″N 92°22′53″W	Mountain Home	
5	Casey House	Casey House	December 4, 1975 (#75000374)	Fairgrounds off U.S. Highway 62; 36°19′26″N 92°22′56″W	Mountain Home	
6	Cold Water School	Cold Water School	May 29, 2008 (#08000485)	2422 County Road 73; 36°08′26″N 92°15′58″W	Big Flat	
7	Cotter Bridge	Cotter Bridge	April 4, 1990 (#90000518)	U.S. Highway 62B over the White River; 36°16′03″N 92°32′50″W	Cotter	
8	Old Cotter High School Gymnasium	Old Cotter High School Gymnasium	September 29, 1995 (#95001147)	412 Powell St. 36°16′14″N 92°32′09″W	Cotter	
9	Cotter Water Tower	Cotter Water Tower	January 24, 2007 (#06001280)	Northeast of the junction of U.S. Highway 62B and State St. 36°16′34″N 92°31′46″W	Cotter	
10	Davis House	Davis House	March 23, 1995 (#95000271)	Southeastern corner of the junction of Wolf Street and Highway 5; 36°12′35″N 92°17′10″W	Norfork	
11	Domino Shed		January 13, 2025 (#100011298)	9736 Arkansas Highway 14; 36°00′19″N 92°24′16″W	Big Flat	
12	Fort Smith to Jackson Road-Talbert's Ferry Segments		September 22, 2004 (#04001030)	Address Restricted	Cotter	Segments of the Trail of Tears
13	Galatia Church		September 8, 2020 (#100005579)	West side AR 5, north of jct. with Havner Rd. 36°11′28″N 92°14′32″W	Norfork vicinity	
14	Horace Mann School Historic District	Horace Mann School Historic District	January 29, 2007 (#06001311)	City Hall Circle; 36°12′19″N 92°17′02″W	Norfork	
15	Uncle Willie Huffines Park		January 13, 2025 (#100011299)	11812 Arkansas Highway 14; 36°00′26″N 92°22′25″W	Big Flat vicinity	
16	Sid Hutcheson Building	Sid Hutcheson Building	September 30, 2014 (#14000789)	13912 AR 5, S. 36°12′31″N 92°17′12″W	Norfork	
17	Mountain Home Cemetery, Historic Section		February 13, 2020 (#100004895)	147 East 11th St. 36°19′45″N 92°23′04″W	Mountain Home	
18	Mountain Home Commercial Historic District	Mountain Home Commercial Historic District	June 15, 2010 (#10000348)	Roughly bounded on the north by East 5th St., East 9th St. on the south, South St. on the east, and Hickory St. on the west 36°20′04″N 92°23′04″W	Mountain Home	
19	Old Joe		May 4, 1982 (#82002094)	Address Restricted	Norfork	
20	Rollins Hospital	Rollins Hospital	September 20, 2007 (#07000970)	107 E. Main St. 36°16′58″N 92°29′40″W	Gassville	
21	Wolf Cemetery	Wolf Cemetery	March 13, 2013 (#13000063)	County Road 68; 36°09′48″N 92°15′26″W	Norfork	
22	Jacob Wolf House	Jacob Wolf House	April 13, 1973 (#73000380)	On Highway 5, west of the fork of the White and North Fork Rivers; 36°12′37″N 92°17′11″W	Norfork	

== Former listings ==
	Name on the Register	Image	Date listed	Date removed	Location	City or town	Description
1	North Fork Bridge	North Fork Bridge	April 9, 1990 (#90000512)	September 29, 2015	Highway 5, over the North Fork of the White River (North Fork River); 36°12′49″N 92°17′11″W	Norfork	

== See also ==
- List of National Historic Landmarks in Arkansas
- National Register of Historic Places listings in Arkansas
