= Wolf Cemetery =

Historic cemetery in Arkansas, United States

- U.S. National Register of Historic Places
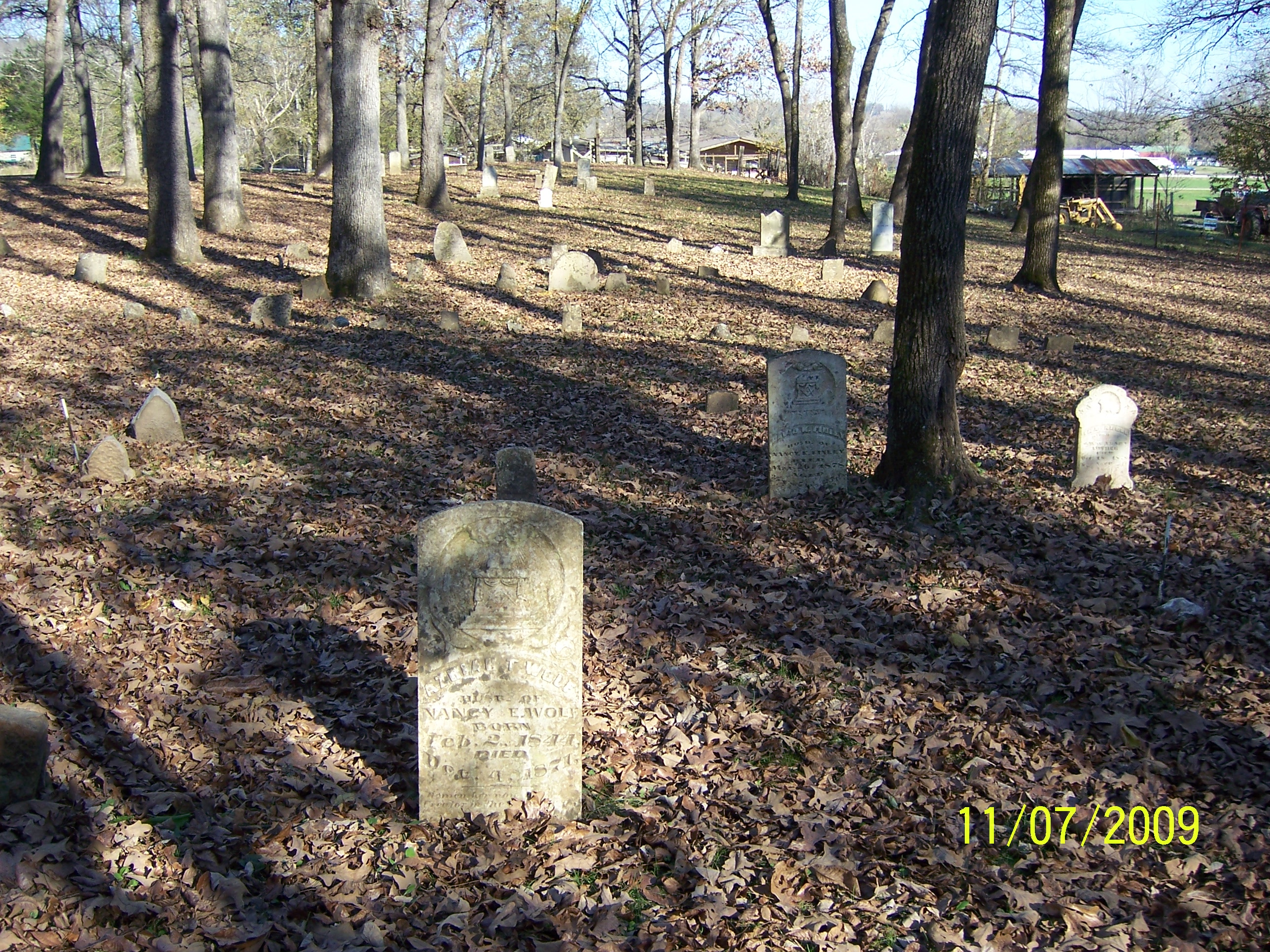

- Location within Arkansas Location within the United States
- Location: County Road 68, Norfork, Arkansas
- Coordinates: 36.16333°N 92.25711°W
- Area: less than one acre
- Built: 1820
- NRHP reference No.: 13000063
- Added to NRHP: March 13, 2013

The Wolf Cemetery is a historic cemetery in rural Baxter County, Arkansas. It is located near the end of County Road 68, just south of its crossing of railroad tracks and north of the White River. It is a small parcel of less than 0.5 acres (0.20 ha), set on a rise above the river plain. The cemetery was established c. 1820, and contains the remains of a number of Baxter County's earliest settlers from the Adams and Wolf families. There are 25 marked and about 75 unmarked graves, with the oldest marked grave dating to 1823. Its most recent burial was in the early 20th century.

The cemetery was listed on the National Register of Historic Places in 2013.

== See also ==
- Jacob Wolf House
- National Register of Historic Places listings in Baxter County, Arkansas
