= Case House =

Case House may refer to:

- Case-Shiras-Dearmore House, Mountain Home, Arkansas, NRHP-listed
- C.B. Case Motor Co. Building, Mountain View, Arkansas, NRHP-listed
- Benomi Case House, Windsor, Connecticut, NRHP-listed
- Lloyd Case House, Honolulu, Hawaii, NRHP-listed
- Foreman-Case House, Delphi, Indiana, NRHP-listed
- Larnerd Case House, Des Moines, Iowa, NRHP-listed
- Morgan-Case Homestead, Phillipsburg, Montana, NRHP-listed
- Case Farmstead, Pattenburg, New Jersey, NRHP-listed
- Case-Dvoor Farmstead, Raritan, New Jersey, NRHP-listed
- Case Mansion, Canton, Ohio, formerly listed on the NRHP
- J. I. Case Plow Works Building, Oklahoma City, Oklahoma, NRHP-listed
- William Case Farm, Champoeg, Oregon, NRHP-listed
- Case House (Parkersburg, West Virginia), NRHP-listed

== See also ==
- Case Brothers Historic District, Manchester, Connecticut, NRHP-listed
