= Old Joe =

Old Joe may refer to:

== People, real or fictional ==
- Joseph P. Kennedy Sr. , patriarch of the Kennedy political family
- Joseph Stalin, (1879–1953) Communist dictator of the USSR from 1929 until his death in 1953
- Joe Biden (born 1942), 46th president of the United States, sometimes referred to as "Old Joe" in the media
- Old Joe (Breaking Bad), a character in the TV series Breaking Bad
- Old Joe, a character portrayed by Bruce Willis in the 2012 Looper (film)
- Old Joe, a minor character in A Christmas Carol who buys the belongings of the deceased Scrooge

== Other uses ==
- Old Joe (Norfork, Arkansas), rock art panel listed on the U.S. National Register of Historic Places in Arkansas
- Old Joe Clark, a folk song
- 10515 Old Joe, an asteroid
- Joe Camel, a former advertising mascot for Camel cigarettes
- Joseph Chamberlain Memorial Clock Tower at the University of Birmingham, England
- Old Joe, a Confederate Civil War memorial in Gainesville, Georgia, in the United States of America

== See also ==
- Poor Joe (disambiguation)
