= Arkansas Highway 201 =

State highway in Arkansas, United States

Highway 201

Route information
- Maintained by ArDOT
- Length: 24.05 mi (38.70 km)
- Existed: July 10, 1957–present

Major junctions
- South end: AR 341 in Norfork
- US 62 / US 412 in Mountain Home; AR 5 in Mountain Home; US 62B in Mountain Home
- North end: Route J at the Missouri state line in Clarkridge

Location
- Country: United States
- State: Arkansas
- Counties: Baxter

Highway system
- Arkansas Highway System; Interstate; US; State; Business; Spurs; Suffixed; Scenic; Heritage
← AR 200	→ AR 202

Highway 201 (AR 201, Ark. 201, and Hwy. 201) is a north–south state highway in Baxter County, Arkansas. The route runs 24.05 miles (38.70 km) from Arkansas Highway 341 in Salesville north to the Missouri state line through Mountain Home, the county seat of Baxter County.

== Route description ==
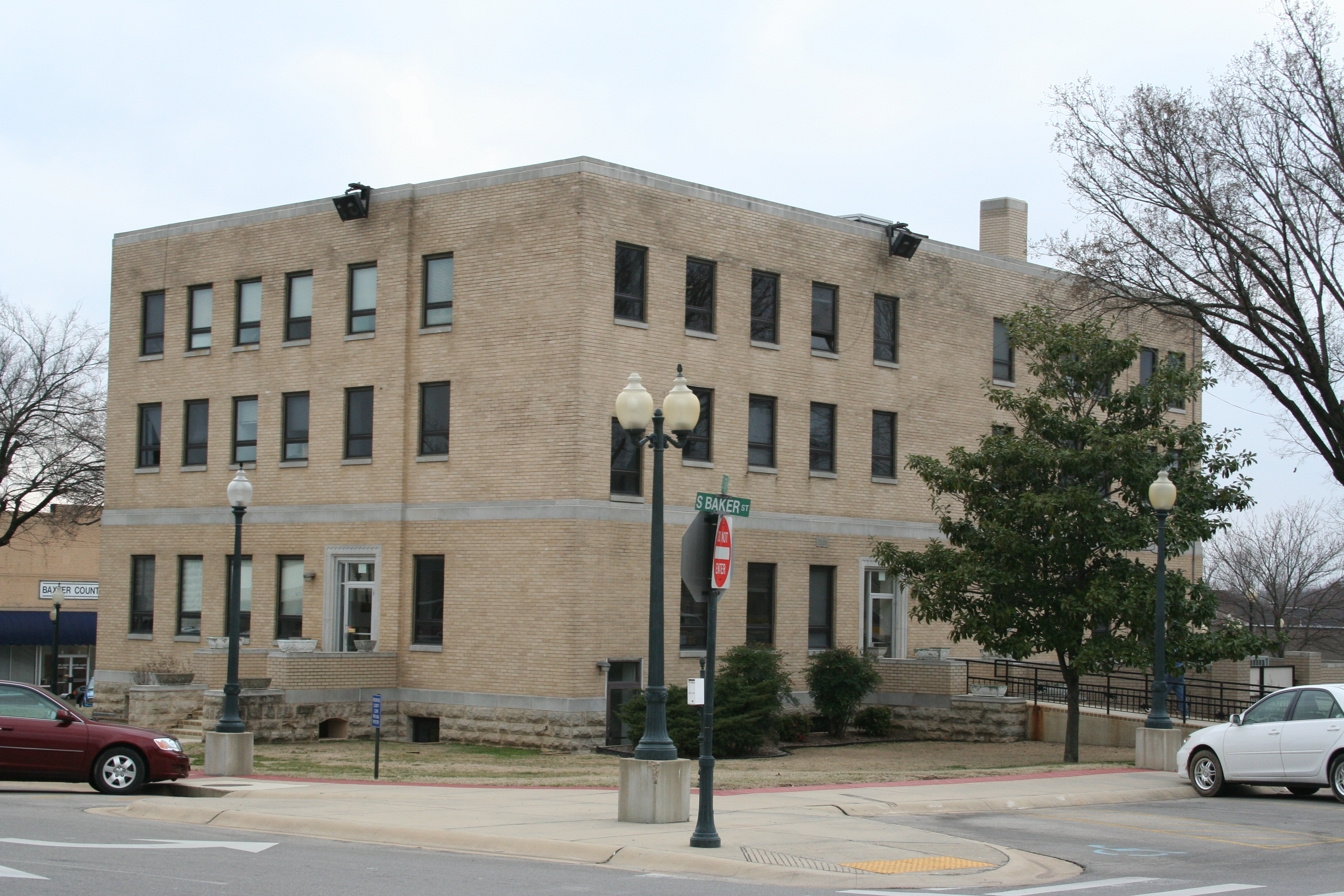
AR 201 passes the Baxter County Courthouse, which is listed on the National Register of Historic Places.

AR 201 begins in Salesville at Push Mountain Road. The highway runs west to Shady Grove, when it curves north to Mountain Home. Upon reaching Mountain Home, AR 201 intersects US 62/US 412 before the lone AR 201 spur leaves the main route. AR 201 continues north as S College Street past the Casey House until intersecting 9th Street. A concurrency forms east then north through downtown Mountain Home. AR 5/AR 201 intersect and follow US 62B for six blocks north, passing the Mountain Home Commercial Historic District and Baxter County Courthouse, both on the National Register of Historic Places. The routes run together as Hickory Street when AR 5/AR 201 branch west and US 62B stays east. Shortly after this fork, AR 201 departs AR 5 and heads due north. The highway runs through north Mountain Home and exits town, becoming a winding rural route. AR 201 runs through the unincorporated community of Clarkridge near the Missouri state line, when the road becomes state supplemental route J.

== History ==
The first portion of Highway 201 was from Mountain Home to Missouri, and was designated on July 10, 1957. The highway was entirely gravel. The southern half of this segment was paved in 1961. The highway was extended south to Salesville in 1963. The entire northern segment was paved to the Missouri state line the following year. The entire southern portion was paved by 1979.

== Major intersections ==
Mile markers reset at concurrencies. The entire route is in Baxter County.

Location	mi	km	Destinations	Notes
Salesville	0.0	0.0	AR 341 – Norfork	Southern terminus
Mountain Home	10.0	16.1	US 62 / US 412	
Mountain Home	10.5	16.9	AR 201S south	AR 201S northern terminus
Mountain Home	11.5	18.5	AR 5 south (9th St.)	AR 5 concurrency north
Mountain Home	0.8 miles (1.3 km) concurrency north with AR 5 and US 62B			
Mountain Home	0.0	0.0	AR 5 north – Midway, Gainesville MO	AR 5 concurrency ends
Clarkridge	12.6	20.3	Route J	Northern terminus; Missouri state line
1.000 mi = 1.609 km; 1.000 km = 0.621 mi: Concurrency terminus

== Mountain Home spur ==
Highway 201S
- Location: Mountain Home
- Length: 0.25 mi (400 m)
- Existed: July 31, 1974–June 1, 2011

Highway 201 Spur is a former spur route of 0.25-mile (0.40 km) in Mountain Home.

== See also ==
- List of state highways in Arkansas
