= North Fork Bridge =

North Fork Bridge may refer to:

- North Fork Bridge (Arkansas), AR 5, over the North Fork River, near Norfork, Arkansas, NRHP-listed
- North Fork Bridge (California), a railroad bridge over the North Fork Feather River
