= Rollins Hospital =

- U.S. National Register of Historic Places
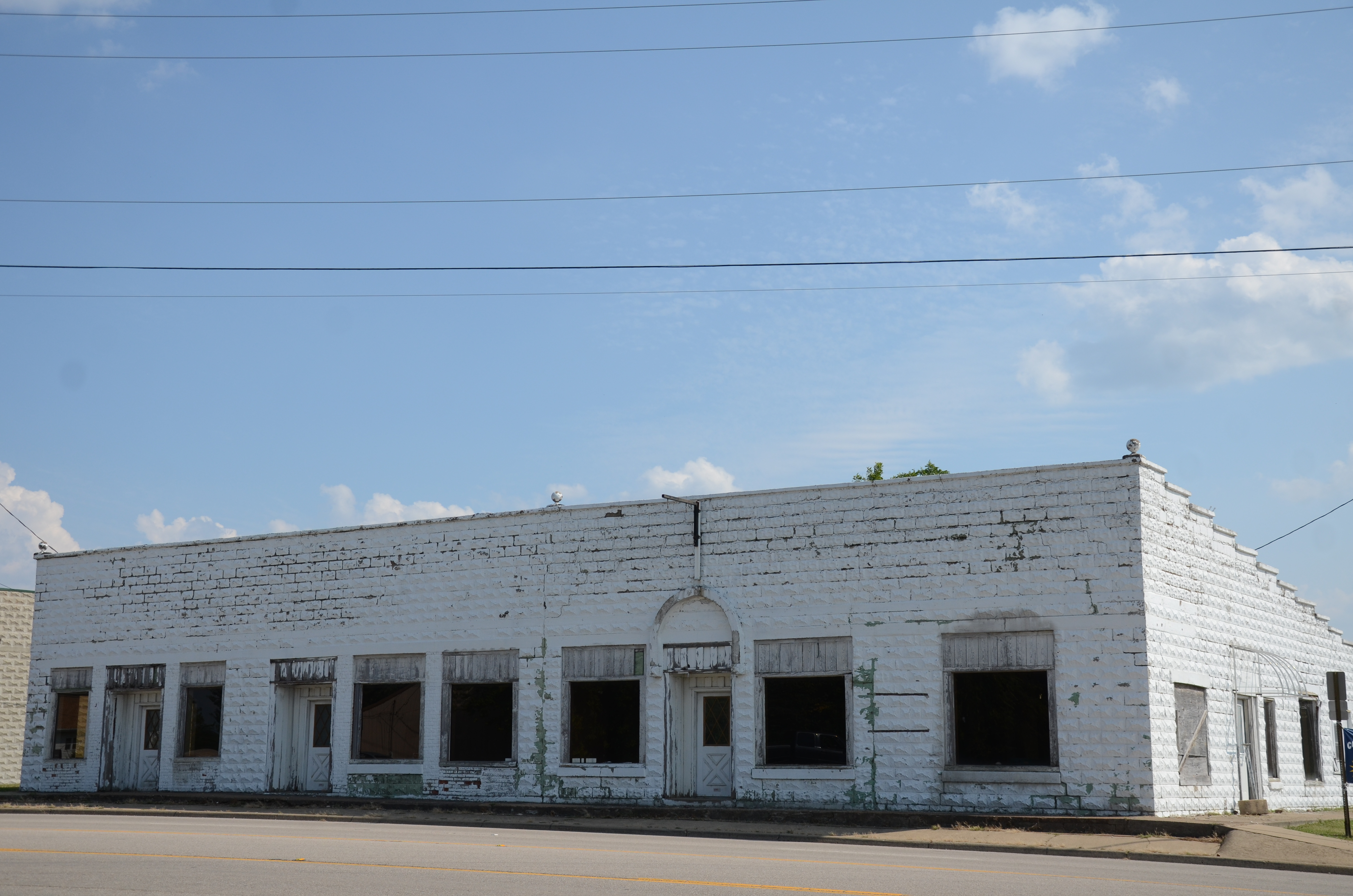

- Location within Arkansas Location within the United States
- Location: 107 E. Main St., Gassville, Arkansas
- Coordinates: 36°16′58″N 92°29′40″W
- Area: less than one acre
- Built: 1923
- Built by: Ben Lamb
- Architectural style: Early Commercial
- NRHP reference No.: 07000970
- Added to NRHP: September 20, 2007

The Rollins Hospital is a historic former hospital building at 107 East Main Street in Gassville, Arkansas.

== History ==
It is a single-story building, built in 1923 out of concrete blocks fashioned locally to resemble native stone. The hospital was established by Dr. William James Rollins, and was the first in Baxter County. It originally occupied only about a third of the building's space, but gradually expanded to occupy all of it. It functioned until 1954, when its last doctor died.

It was owned by the Baxter County Historical Society and was used as a museum devoted to Dr. Rollins and county history. The Baxter County Heritage Museum closed in 2008 due to damage from a tornado and the building has since been sold to a private individual. The Society now operates the Baxter County Historical Museum in Mountain Home, Arkansas.

The building was listed on the National Register of Historic Places in 2007.

== See also ==
- National Register of Historic Places listings in Baxter County, Arkansas
