= Horace Mann School Historic District =

Historic district in Arkansas, United States

- U.S. National Register of Historic Places
- U.S. Historic district
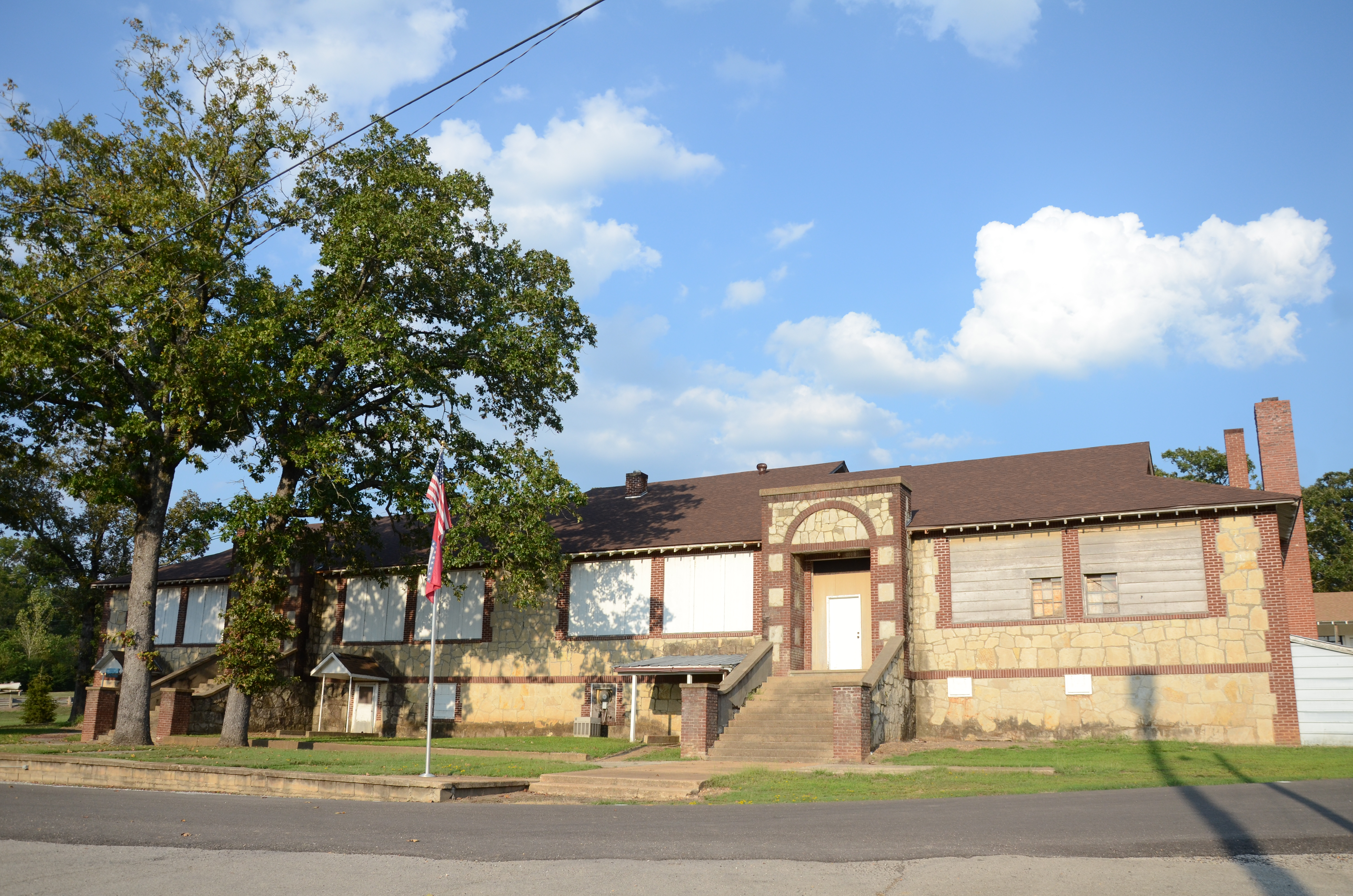

- Location within Arkansas Location within the United States
- Location: City Hall Circle, Norfork, Arkansas
- Coordinates: 36°12′19″N 92°17′2″W
- Area: 2 acres (0.81 ha)
- Built: 1936
- Architect: Monigle, O.O. & O.L. Jacobs; Mabrey, Otis
- Architectural style: Bungalow/craftsman
- MPS: New Deal Recovery Efforts in Arkansas MPS
- NRHP reference No.: 06001311
- Added to NRHP: January 29, 2007

The Horace Mann School Historic District of Norfork, Arkansas encompasses a complex of four Depression-era school buildings near the center of the community. It includes a main school building, built with Works Progress Administration (WPA) funding in 1936, a home economics building and a vocational educational building, both built in 1937 by the National Youth Administration, and the auditorium/gymnasium, built in 1940 with WPA funds. All are single-story Craftsman-style buildings, although the gymnasium presents more stories because of a partially exposed basement. The complex was used as a school until the mid-1980s, and is now owned by the city, which uses the buildings for a variety of purposes. It is a well-preserved and remarkably complete Depression-era school complex.

The complex was listed on the National Register of Historic Places in 2007.

== See also ==
- National Register of Historic Places listings in Baxter County, Arkansas
