= KPFM =

KPFM may refer to:

- KPFM (FM), a radio station (105.5 FM) licensed to serve Mountain Home, Arkansas, United States
- Kelvin probe force microscopy (KPFM), a noncontact variant of atomic force microscopy
