= Norfork High School =

Location
- 136 Mildred Simpson Drive; Norfork, Arkansas 72658; United States; 36°11′49″N 92°15′56″W

Information
- School type: Public comprehensive
- Status: Open
- School district: Norfork School District
- Superintendent: Chip Layne
- CEEB code: 041840
- NCES School ID: 051056000774
- Principal: Bobby Hulse (1981-2021) Brooke Chapman (2024-Present)
- Teaching staff: 32.84 (on FTE basis)
- Grades: 7–12
- Enrollment: 203 (2023–2024)
- Student to teacher ratio: 6.18
- Education system: ADE Smart Core
- Classes offered: Regular, Advanced Placement (AP)
- Colors: Red and black
- Athletics conference: 1A 2 North
- Mascot: Panther
- Team name: Norfork Panthers
- Accreditation: ADE; AdvancED (2002–)
- USNWR ranking: No. 18 (AR); No. 1863 (USA)
- Feeder schools: Arrie Goforth Elementary School (K–6)
- Federal Funding: Title I
- Website: norforksd.smartsiteshost.com/nhs

Norfork High School is a nationally recognized comprehensive public high school located in the rural, distant city of Norfork, Arkansas, in the United States. The school provides secondary education for students in grades 9 through 12 supporting Norfork and portions of Mountain Home, Calico Rock, Briarcliff, and Salesville, Arkansas. It is one of three public high schools in Baxter County, Arkansas, and the sole high school administered by the Norfork School District.

Long-time principal Bobby D. Hulse died on January 27, 2021, of COVID-19 after a 41-year career as the principal of the high school.

== Academics ==
Norfork High School is accredited by the Arkansas Department of Education (ADE) and has been accredited by AdvancED since 2002. The assumed course of study follows the Smart Core curriculum developed by the ADE, which requires students complete at least 22 units prior to graduation, though Norfork requires 24. Students complete regular coursework and exams and may take Advanced Placement (AP) courses and exam with the opportunity to receive college credit.

Norfork High School was nationally recognized as a Silver Medalist and ranked No. 18 in Arkansas and No. 1,863 in the nation in the Best High Schools Report 2012 developed by U.S. News & World Report.

== Extracurricular activities ==
The Norfork High School mascot and athletic emblem is the Panther with red, black and white serving as the school colors.

=== Athletics ===
The Norfork Panthers compete in interscholastic activities within the 4A Classification via the 1A Region 2 Conference, as administered by the Arkansas Activities Association. The Panthers field teams in cross country,(boys/girls), bowling (boys/girls), basketball (boys/girls), baseball, softball, track and field (boys/girls), and cheer.

=== Quiz Bowl ===
The Panthers also compete academically in Quiz Bowl, via the AGQBA program. State winners of their 2010-2011, 2015-2016, 2016–2017, 2018–2019, and 2022–2023 years. These winnings have led the team onto to compete on AETN. In the summer of 2022, Norfork's Quiz Bowl team placed 2nd on AETN, losing to a private high school, Haas Hall Academy 290-295. However, they went on to nationals in New Orleans and placed in the top 28 Quiz Bowl teams in the nation.
