= Sid Hutcheson Building =

- U.S. National Register of Historic Places
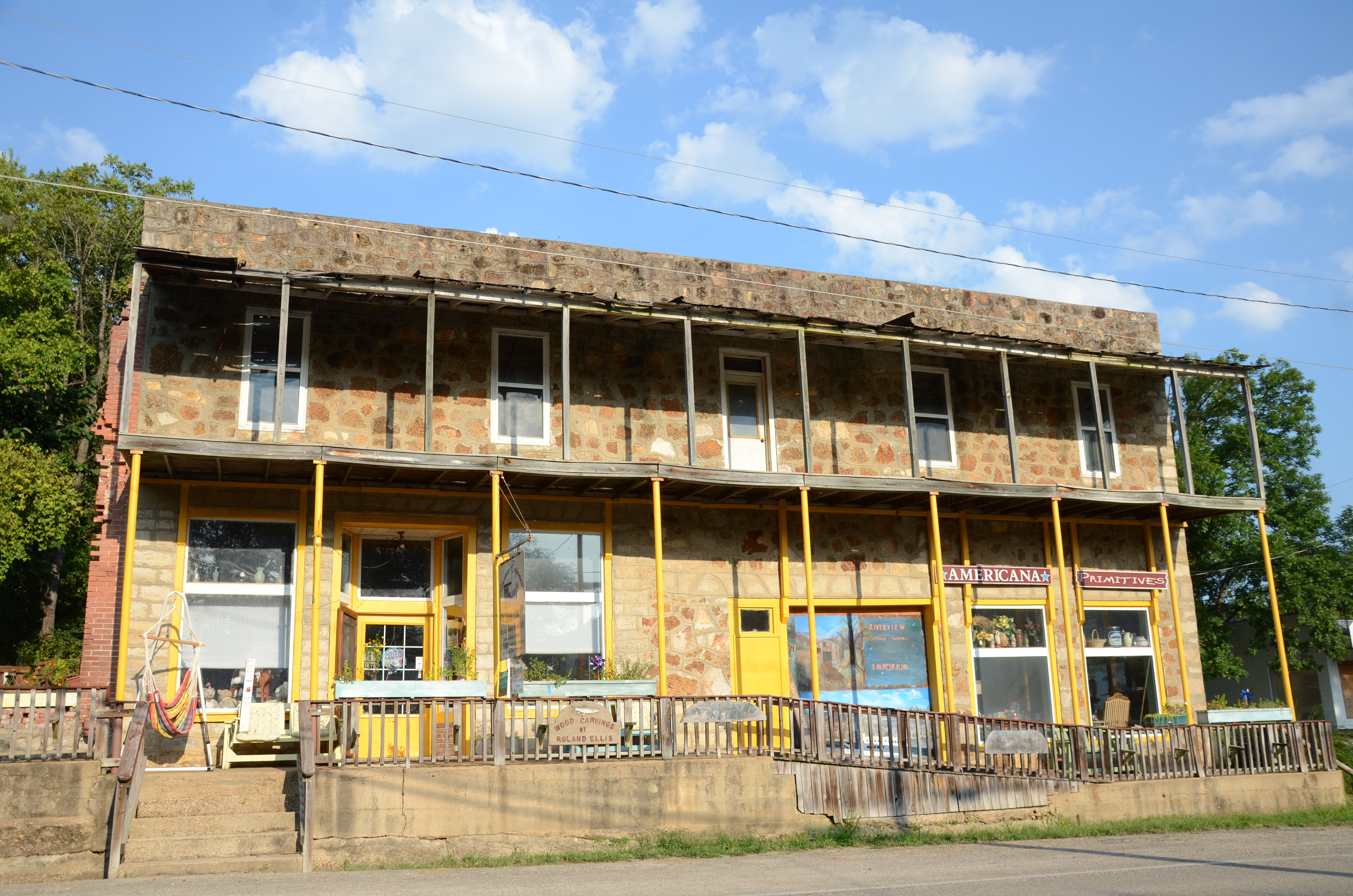

- Location within Arkansas Location within the United States
- Location: 13192 AR 5, Norfork, Arkansas
- Coordinates: 36°12′31″N 92°17′12″W
- Area: less than one acre
- Built: 1910
- Architectural style: Romanesque
- NRHP reference No.: 14000789
- Added to NRHP: September 30, 2014

The Sid Hutcheson Building is a historic commercial building at 13912 Arkansas Highway 5 (the northeast corner of Main Street) in the center of Norfork, Arkansas. Built c. 1910, it is a vernacular two-story structure, built out of local stone and concrete. The west-facing facade is dominated by a two-story porch extending the full width of the building. The building is divided into three storefronts, which housed a grocery story, a Ford dealership, and a hotel, when it was completed. It is one of six commercial buildings, and is representative of the community's growth after the arrival of the railroad in the early 20th century.

The building was listed on the National Register of Historic Places in 2014.

== See also ==
- National Register of Historic Places listings in Baxter County, Arkansas
