= Davis House (Norfork, Arkansas) =

Historic house in Arkansas, United States

- U.S. National Register of Historic Places
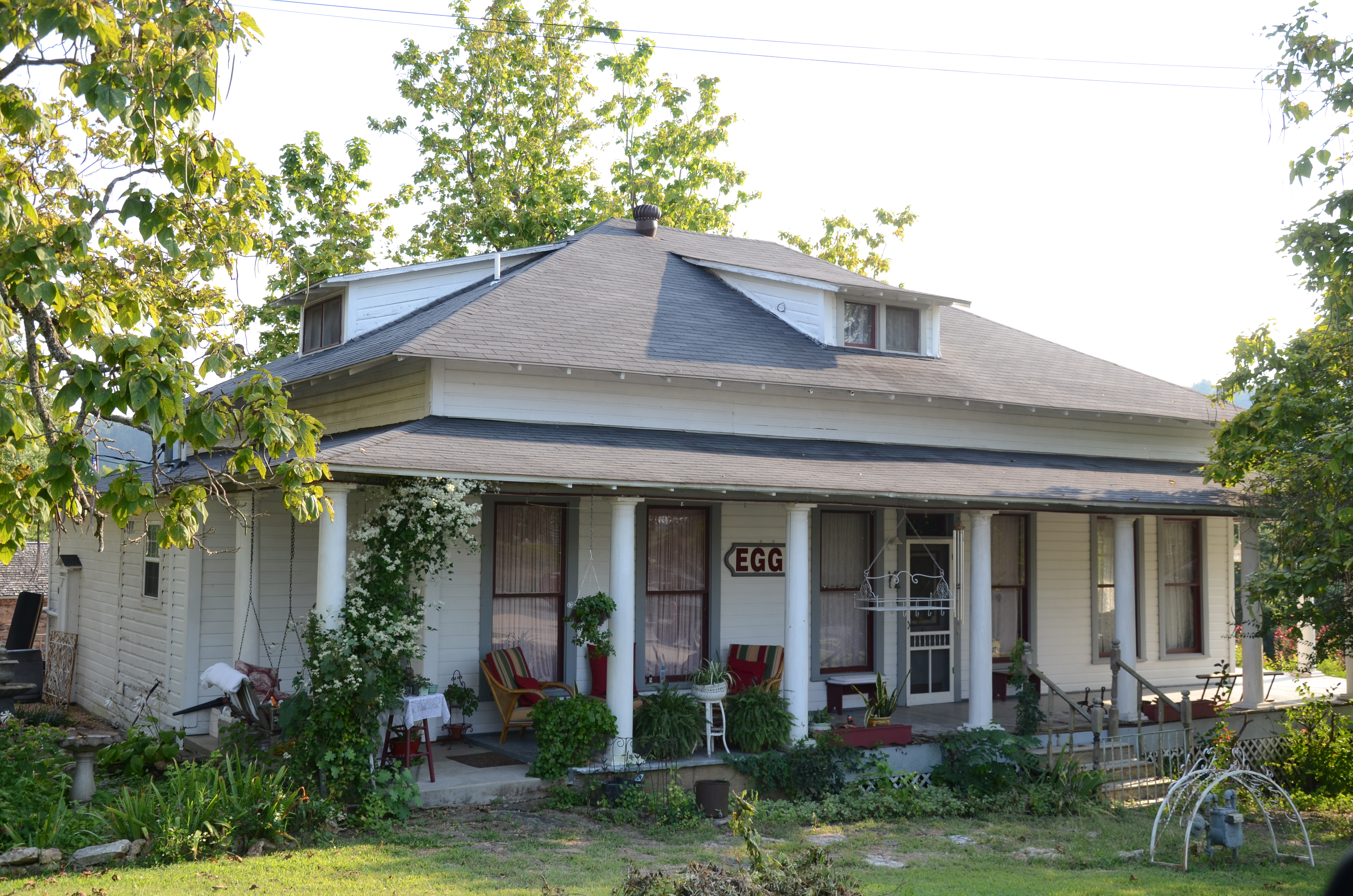

- Location within Arkansas Location within the United States
- Location: Jct. of Wolf St. and AR 5, SE corner, Norfork, Arkansas
- Coordinates: 36°12′35″N 92°17′10″W
- Area: less than one acre
- Built: c.1928
- Built by: Joe Torrence
- Architectural style: Plain traditional
- NRHP reference No.: 95000271
- Added to NRHP: March 23, 1995

The Davis House is a historic house at the corner of Wolf Street and Arkansas Highway 5 in Norfork, Arkansas. It is a vernacular Plain-Traditional 1 1/2-story frame structure, with a hip roof and a stucco foundation. It has a hip-roofed porch extending across its front, and shed-roof dormers piercing its distinctive pyramidal roof on two elevations. The house was built c. 1928 for Charley Blevins, but was owned for about 50 years by members of the Davis family.

The house was listed on the National Register of Historic Places in 1995, for its architectural uniqueness.

== See also ==
- National Register of Historic Places listings in Baxter County, Arkansas
