= Big Flat School Gymnasium =

- U.S. National Register of Historic Places
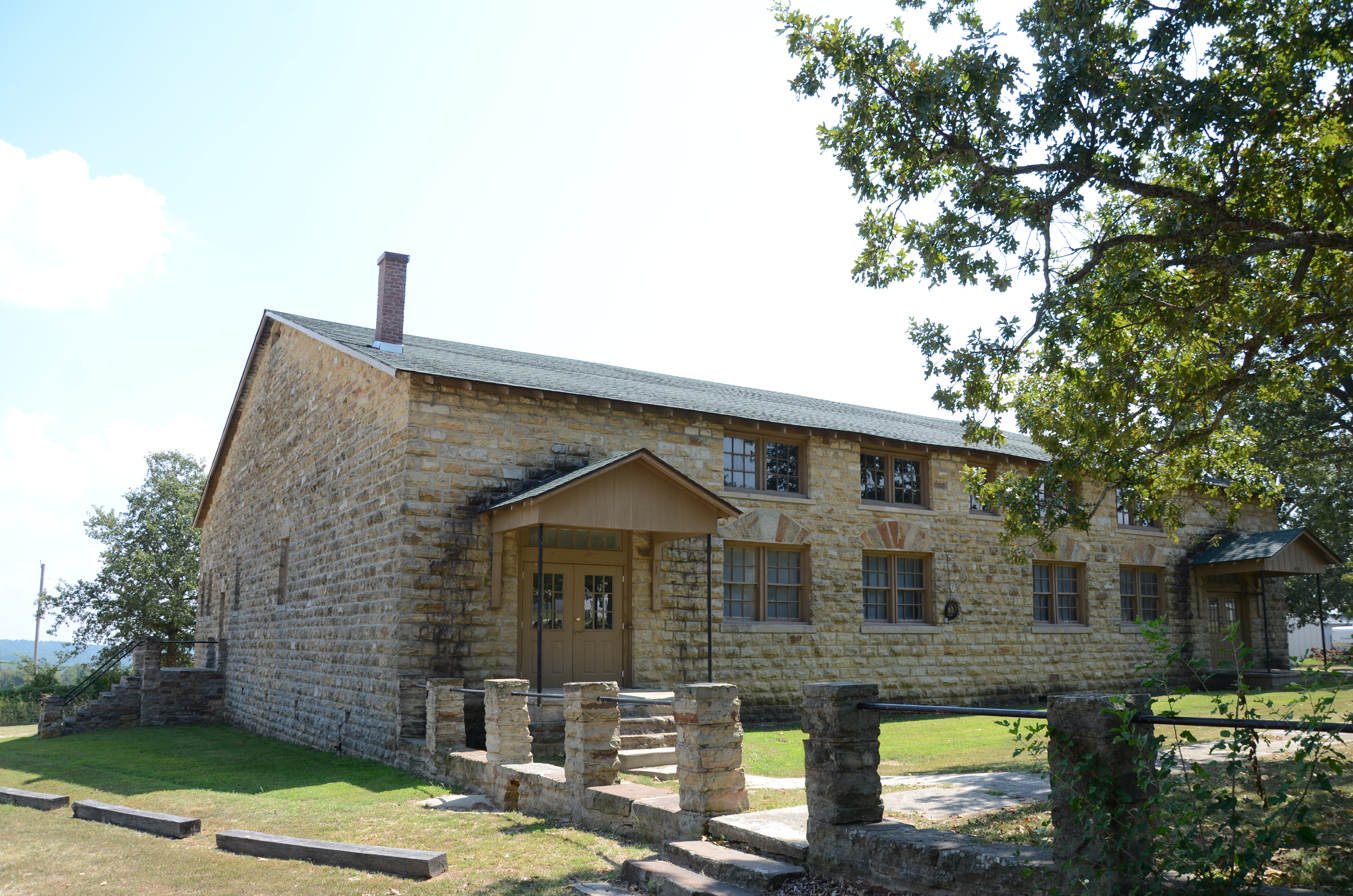

- Location within Arkansas Location within the United States
- Location: Co. Rd. 121 S of jct. with AR 14, Big Flat, Arkansas
- Coordinates: 36°0′10″N 92°24′17″W
- Area: less than one acre
- Built: 1938
- Built by: Harrison Griffin, National Youth Administration
- Architectural style: Bungalow/craftsman, Plain Traditional
- MPS: Public Schools in the Ozarks MPS
- NRHP reference No.: 93001255
- Added to NRHP: November 19, 1993

The Big Flat School Gymnasium is a historic school building in Big Flat, Arkansas. It is a single-story stone masonry structure with a gable roof. It is basically Plain-Traditional in its styling, except for its Craftsman-style entrance porches, both located on the south (main) facade. The most significant alteration since its construction in 1938-41 is the replacement of the eastern stone wall with a frame structure clad in artificial siding. The gymnasium was built by crews of the National Youth Administration, and is the only major public works building in the community.

The building was listed on the National Register of Historic Places in 1993.

== See also ==
- National Register of Historic Places listings in Baxter County, Arkansas
