= Clarkridge, Arkansas =

- Unincorporated community
- Clarkridge's position in Arkansas. Clarkridge, Arkansas (the United States)
- Coordinates: 36°28′40″N 92°21′05″W
- Country: United States
- State: Arkansas
- County: Baxter
- Township: Pigeon
- Elevation: 869 ft (265 m)
- Time zone: UTC-6 (Central (CST))
  - Summer (DST): UTC-5 (CDT)
- ZIP code: 72623
- Area code: 870
- GNIS feature ID: 76623

Clarkridge, Arkansas (formerly Clark Ridge) is an unincorporated community in Baxter County, Arkansas, United States. The community is located near the end of Arkansas Highway 201 near the Missouri state line. Clarkridge has one post office, three churches, one gas station/quick stop store, and one resort on Norfork Lake. Clarkridge has a Volunteer Fire Department consisting of four fire stations and over 30 volunteer firefighters. The community is very active in helping the extended community and has won the Arkansas Volunteer Community of the Year award for 13 of the past 14 years.
