= North Fork Bridge (Arkansas) =

- Formerly listed on the U.S. National Register of Historic Places
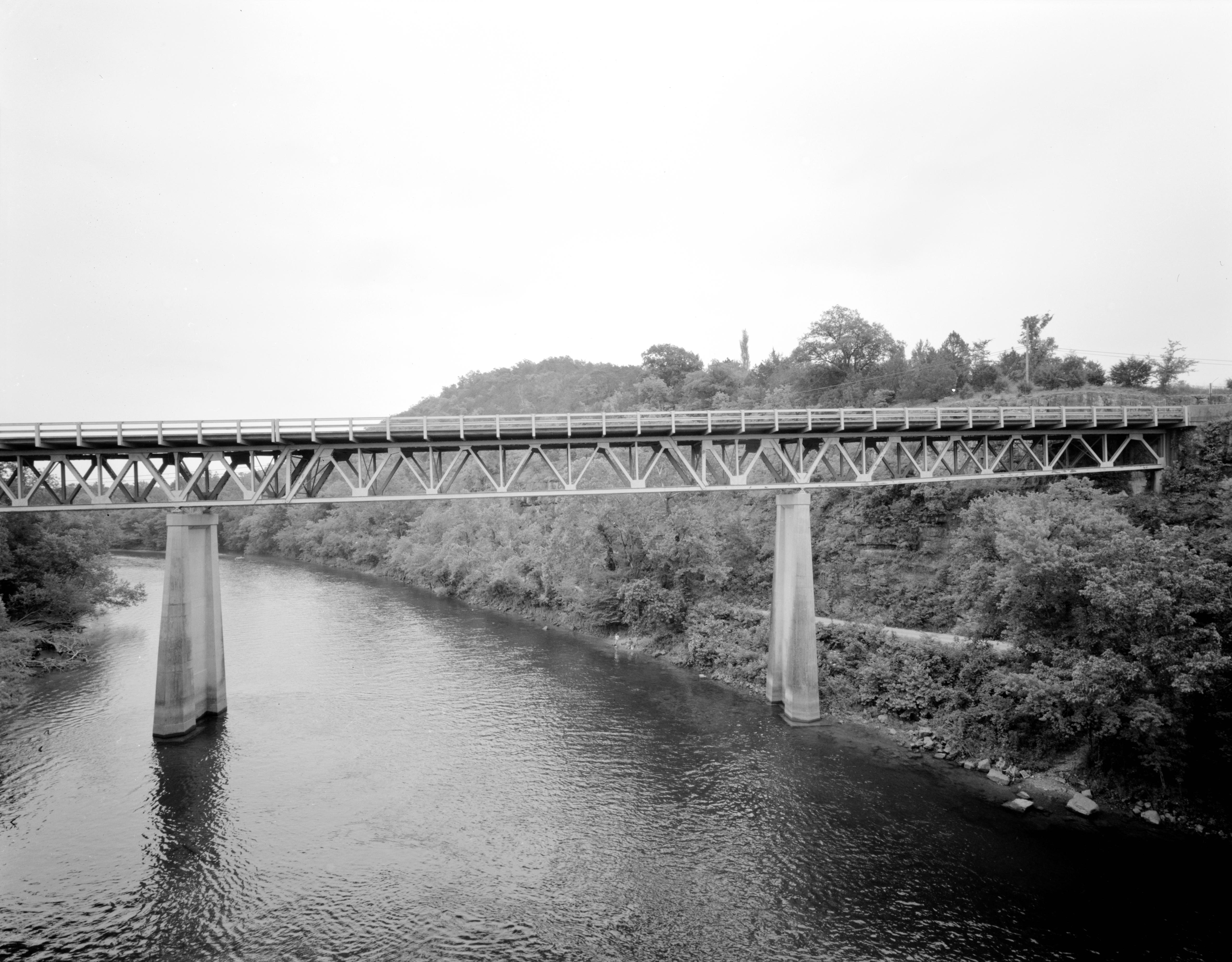

- Location within Arkansas Location within the United States
- Location: AR 5 over North Fork of the White River, Norfork, Arkansas
- Coordinates: 36°12′49″N 92°17′11″W
- Built by: Vincennes Bridge Co.
- Architect: Arkansas Highway & Transportation
- Architectural style: Warren deck truss
- MPS: Historic Bridges of Arkansas MPS
- NRHP reference No.: 90000512

Significant dates
- Added to NRHP: April 9, 1990
- Removed from NRHP: September 29, 2015

The North Fork Bridge carries Arkansas Highway 5 over the North Fork River, or the North Fork of the White River, in Norfork, Arkansas, United States. It is a modern steel girder bridge, replacing a 1937 Warren deck truss bridge, which was the first road crossing of the North Fork River in Norfork. The 1937 bridge, demolished in 2014, was listed on the U.S. National Register of Historic Places in 1990, but was delisted in 2015.

== History ==
The 1937 bridge was a four-span structure designed by the Arkansas Highway & Transportation and built by Vincennes Bridge Co. A total of 518 feet (158 m) in length, the bridge represented an early example steel deck construction. Two of the spans were cantilevered, extending 28 feet (8.5 m) beyond the piers and providing the suspension points for the other two spans. The bridge was documented by the Historic American Engineering Record in 1988.

== See also ==
- List of bridges documented by the Historic American Engineering Record in Arkansas
- List of bridges on the National Register of Historic Places in Arkansas
- National Register of Historic Places listings in Baxter County, Arkansas
