= Casey House (Mountain Home, Arkansas) =

Historic house in Arkansas, United States

- U.S. National Register of Historic Places
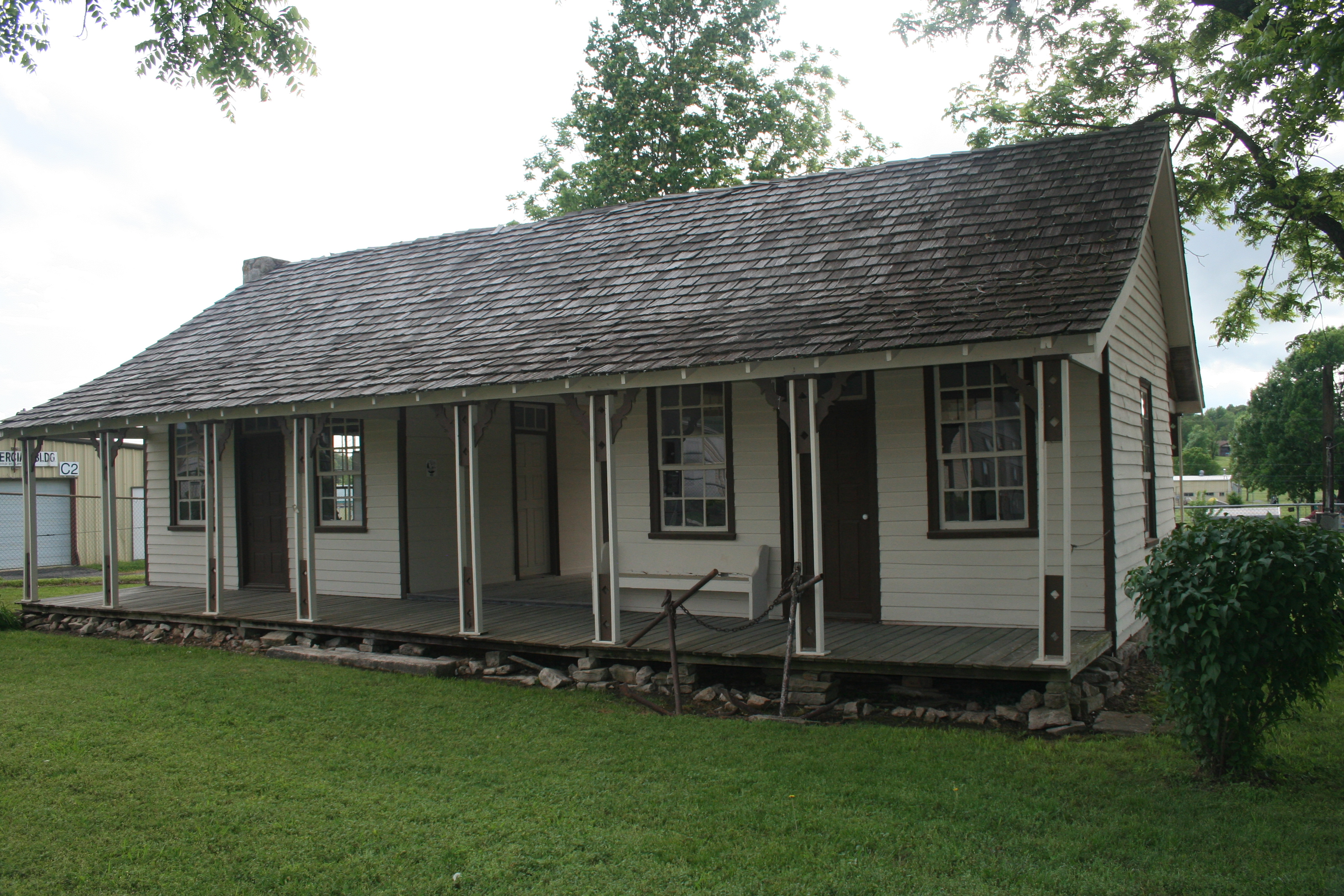

- Location within Arkansas Location within the United States
- Location: Fairgrounds off U.S. 62, Mountain Home, Arkansas
- Coordinates: 36°19′26″N 92°22′56″W
- Area: less than one acre
- Built: 1858
- Built by: Randolph DePriest Casey
- Architectural style: Dog-trot
- NRHP reference No.: 75000374
- Added to NRHP: December 4, 1975

The Casey House is a historic house on the Baxter County Fairgrounds in Mountain Home, Arkansas. Still at its original location when built c. 1858, is a well-preserved local example of a dog trot house, a typical Arkansas pioneer house. It is a rectangular structure made out of two log pens with a breezeway in between. It is finished in clapboard siding on the outside walls, and the breezeway is finished with flushboarding. A porch extends the width of the house front, and is sheltered by the side-gable roof that also covers the house. Colonel Randolph DePriest Casey, its builder, was one of Mountain Home's first settlers, and its first representative in the Arkansas legislature.

The house was listed on the National Register of Historic Places in 1975.

The house was damaged during an F3 tornado on November 18, 1985. It underwent restoration by the Baxter County Historical Society in 2026.

== See also ==
- National Register of Historic Places listings in Baxter County, Arkansas
