= Buford School Building =

- U.S. National Register of Historic Places
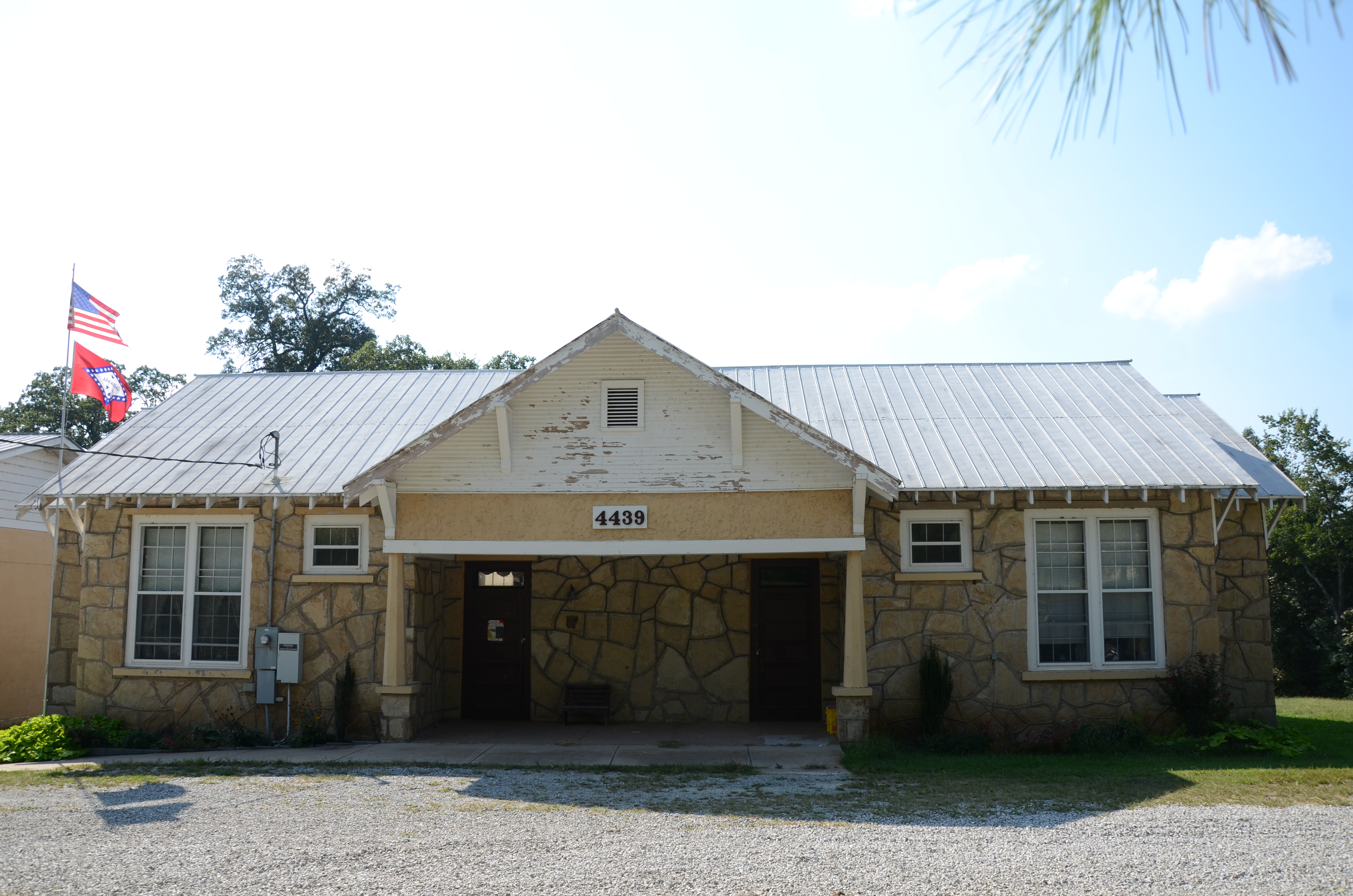

- Location within Arkansas Location within the United States
- Location: AR 126, Buford, Arkansas
- Coordinates: 36°14′55″N 92°25′38″W
- Area: less than one acre
- Built by: Works Progress Administration
- Architectural style: Bungalow/craftsman
- MPS: Public Schools in the Ozarks MPS
- NRHP reference No.: 92001128
- Added to NRHP: September 4, 1992

The Buford School Building is a historic school building on Arkansas Highway 126 in Buford, Arkansas. It is a single-story Plain Traditional structure with Craftsman touches, built in 1936 with funding from the Works Progress Administration. It is fashioned out of mortared gray limestone, with a metal roof and a concrete foundation. The main (east-facing) facade has a projecting gabled porch, supported by concrete piers. The roof is decorated with rafter ends and knee brackets. The building was used as a school until 1960, and has afterward seen other uses, including as a community center.

The building was listed on the National Register of Historic Places in 1992.

== See also ==
- National Register of Historic Places listings in Baxter County, Arkansas
