= Fort Smith to Jackson Road-Talbert's Ferry Segments =

Archaeological site in Arkansas, United States

- U.S. National Register of Historic Places
- Nearest city: Cotter, Arkansas
- Area: 15 acres (6.1 ha)
- MPS: Cherokee Trail of Tears MPS
- NRHP reference No.: 04001030
- Added to NRHP: September 22, 2004

The Fort Smith to Jackson Road-Talbert's Ferry Segments are a section of an historic 19th century road in central western Baxter County, Arkansas. They are surviving elements of a road built in the 1830s which connected Fort Smith with Jackson County. It was one of the first roads to be built through north central Arkansas, and these segments, located near a crossing of the White River, are documented to have been used by parties removing Native Americans during the Trail of Tears in the 1830s.

== See also ==
- National Register of Historic Places listings in Baxter County, Arkansas
