= KOMT =

- Lakeview, Arkansas; United States
- Broadcast area: Mountain Home, Arkansas
- Frequency: 93.5 MHz
- Branding: 93.5 The Eagle

Programming
- Format: Talk
- Affiliations: Premiere Networks; Salem Radio Network; Townhall News; Westwood One

Ownership
- Owner: John M. Dowdy
- Sister stations: KKTZ, KPFM

History
- First air date: September 15, 1999
- Former call signs: KBFY (1998–1999); KKTZ (1999–2014)

Technical information
- Licensing authority: FCC
- Facility ID: 84090
- Class: C2
- ERP: 16,000 watts
- HAAT: 188.2 meters (617 ft)
- Transmitter coordinates: 36°29′14″N 92°29′40″W

Links
- Public license information: Public file; LMS
- Webcast: Listen live
- Website: KOMT Online

KOMT (93.5 FM) is a radio station airing a talk format licensed to Lakeview, Arkansas. The station serves the Mountain Home, Arkansas area, and is owned by John M. Dowdy.
