= Case-Shiras-Dearmore House =

Historic house in Arkansas, United States

- U.S. National Register of Historic Places
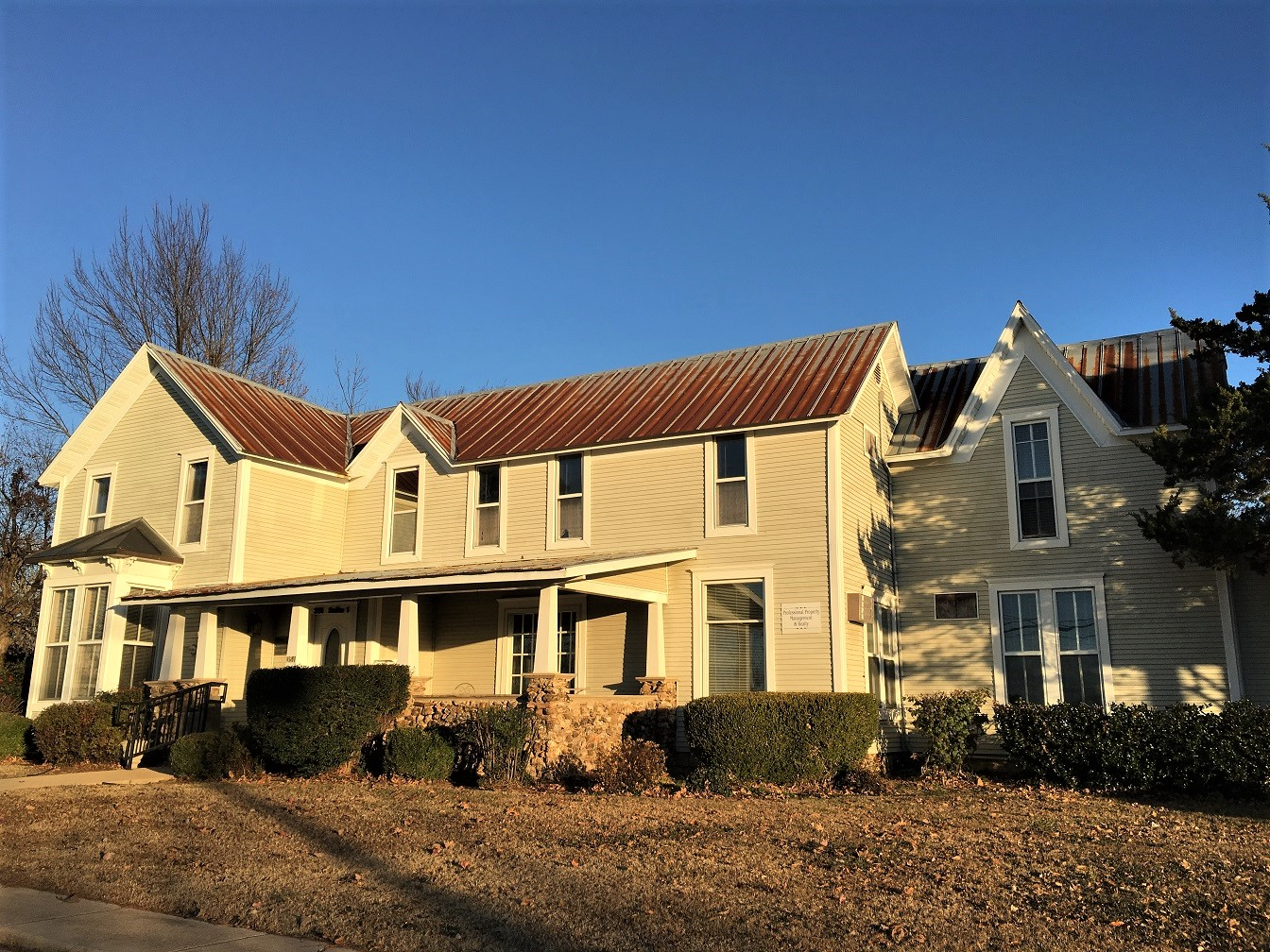

- Location within Arkansas Location within the United States
- Location: 351 E. 4th St. Mountain Home, Arkansas
- Coordinates: 36°20′13″N 92°22′53″W
- Area: less than one acre
- Architectural style: Plain Traditional
- NRHP reference No.: 91000580
- Added to NRHP: February 3, 1992

The Case-Shiras-Dearmore House is a historic house in Mountain Home, Arkansas, United States. It is a 2½-story plain traditional wood-frame structure, with a roughly L-shaped layout, a stone foundation, and a cross-gable roof. A single-story shed-roofed porch stands in the crook of the L, which faces south. The house was built in the 1870s by Dr. J. H. Case, but its most notable resident was Tom Shiras, who acquired the house in 1900 and later married into the Case family. Shiras and his brother published the Baxter Bulletin, a newspaper that grew under his control to become a major regional news outlet with significant editorial influence. The Shiras family owned the property into the 1970s.

The house was listed on the National Register of Historic Places in 1992.

== See also ==
- National Register of Historic Places listings in Baxter County, Arkansas
