= Old Joe (Norfork, Arkansas) =

Archaeological site in Arkansas, United States

- U.S. National Register of Historic Places
- Nearest city: Norfork, Arkansas
- Area: 0.1 acres (0.040 ha)
- MPS: Rock Art Sites in Arkansas TR
- NRHP reference No.: 82002094
- Added to NRHP: May 4, 1982

Old Joe is a prehistoric rock art panel near Norfork in Baxter County, Arkansas. It consists of two shapes painted with a red pigment. One figure is a roughly circular shape with five rays extending upward; it is about 21 centimetres (8.3 in) in height and 16 centimetres (6.3 in) in width. The other figure is a simple roughly circular shape, varying in diameter between 19 and 21 centimetres (7.5 and 8.3 in). The first figure resembles one located at another site further down the White River.

The site was listed on the National Register of Historic Places in 1982.

== See also ==
- National Register of Historic Places listings in Baxter County, Arkansas
