= Norfork School District =

School district in Arkansas, United States

Location
- 44 Fireball Lane; Norfork, Arkansas 72658 United States

District information
- Grades: K–12
- Superintendent: Chip Layne
- Accreditation: Arkansas Department of Education
- Schools: 2
- NCES District ID: 0506060

Students and staff
- Students: 463
- Teachers: 45.78 (on FTE basis)
- Staff: 97.78 (on FTE basis)
- Student–teacher ratio: 10.11
- Athletic conference: 1A 2 North
- District mascot: Panthers
- Colors: Red; Black; White

Other information
- Website: www.norforkschools.org

Norfork School District is a public school district based in Norfork, Arkansas, United States. The school district encompasses 163.02 square miles (422.2 km^{2}) of land including all of Norfork and portions of several Baxter County communities including Briarcliff, and Salesville.

The district provides comprehensive education for kindergarten through grade 12, is accredited by the Arkansas Department of Education (ADE), and its high school is also accredited by AdvancED since 2002.

== History ==
On July 1, 1993, Tri-County School District was disestablished with territory given to multiple districts, including Norfork.

== Schools ==
- Norfork High School, serving more than 200 students in grades 7 through 12.
- Arrie Goforth Intermediate School, serving more than 212 students in kindergarten through 6th grade
