= KKTZ =

Hot adult contemporary radio station in Mountain Home, Arkansas

- Mountain Home, Arkansas; United States
- Broadcast area: North Arkansas
- Frequency: 107.5 MHz
- Branding: Hit 107.5

Programming
- Language: English
- Format: Hot adult contemporary
- Affiliations: Compass Media Networks; SRN News; Westwood One

Ownership
- Owner: Mac Partners; (Twin Lakes Radio)
- Sister stations: KOMT; KPFM

History
- First air date: May 1, 1985
- Former call signs: KFKB (1985); KKTZ (1985–1999); KOMT (1999–2014)
- Call sign meaning: A new way to spell Hit(s)Z', (former sister station KKTZ)

Technical information
- Licensing authority: FCC
- Facility ID: 39532
- Class: C0
- ERP: 100,000 watts
- HAAT: 310 meters (1,020 ft)
- Transmitter coordinates: 36°29′14″N 92°29′40″W

Links
- Public license information: Public file; LMS
- Webcast: Listen live
- Website: www.twinlakesradio.com

KKTZ (107.5 FM, "Hit 107.5") is a radio station airing a hot adult contemporary format, licensed to Mountain Home, Arkansas, United States. The station serves the areas of Mountain Home, Arkansas, Branson, Missouri, Harrison, Arkansas, and West Plains, Missouri, and is owned by Mac Partners.

== History ==
The station went on the air as KFKB on May 1, 1985. On September 30, the station changed its call sign to KKTZ, and the station adopted a contemporary hit radio format as FM107. In September 15, 1999, KKTZ hot AC format moved to 93.5 frequency, while KOMT call sign moved to the stronger 107.5 frequency. On October 11, at 6 a.m., KOMT changed their format to adult standards, branded as The Music of Your Life. In 2014, the station changed its call sign back to the current KKTZ.
