= Briarcliff, Arkansas =

- City
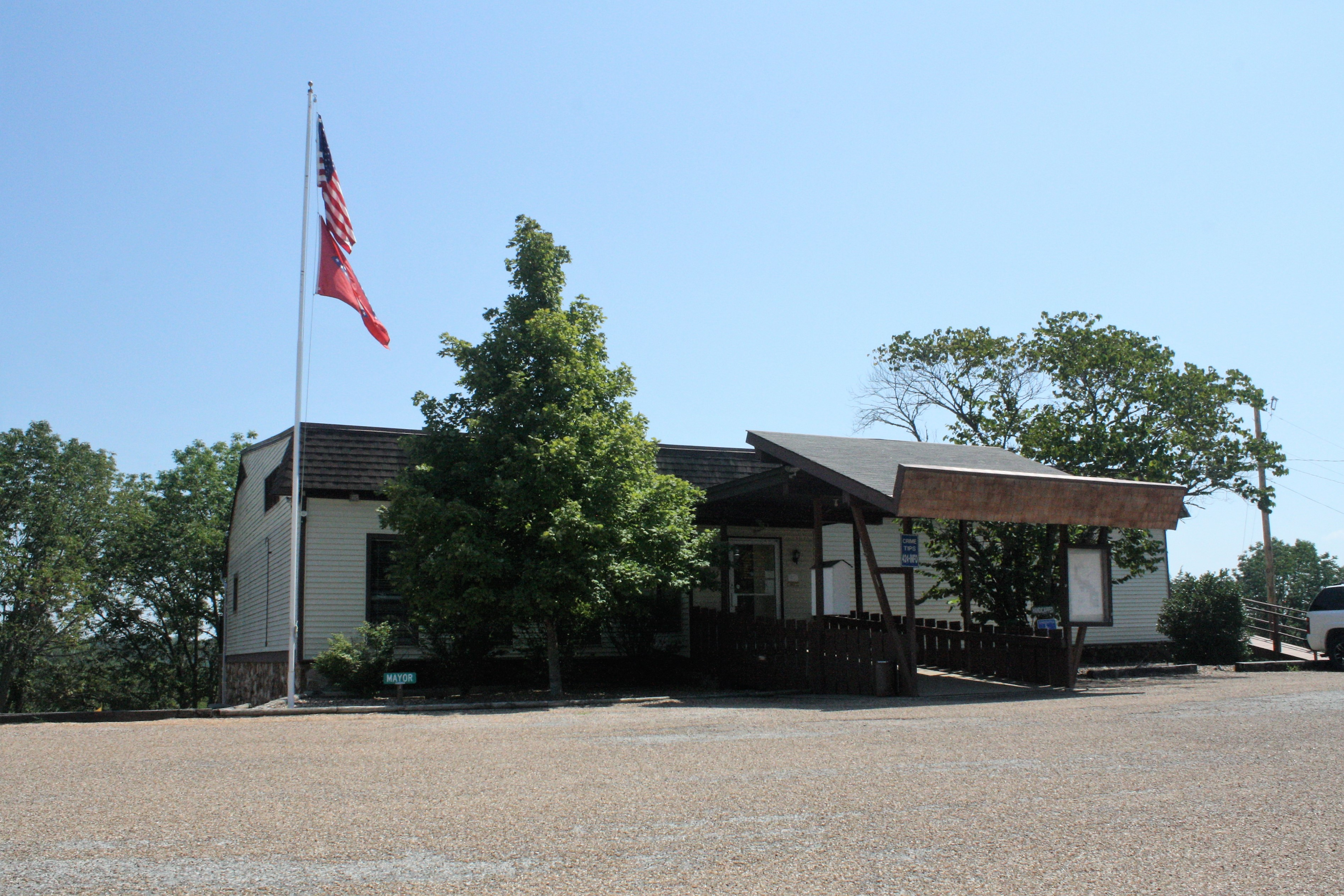
- Briarcliff City Hall

- Seal

- Location of Briarcliff in Baxter County, Arkansas
- Coordinates: 36°16′19″N 92°16′56″W
- Country: United States
- State: Arkansas
- County: Baxter

Area
  - Total: 2.25 sq mi (5.83 km^{2})
  - Land: 2.25 sq mi (5.83 km^{2})
  - Water: 0 sq mi (0.00 km^{2})
- Elevation: 709 ft (216 m)

Population (2020)
  - Total: 236
  - Estimate (2025): 260 ▲
  - Density: 104.8/sq mi (40.47/km^{2})
- Time zone: UTC-6 (Central (CST))
  - Summer (DST): UTC-5 (CDT)
- FIPS code: 05-08665
- GNIS feature ID: 2403922
- Website: cityofbriarcliff.com

Briarcliff is a second-class city in Baxter County, Arkansas, United States. The population was 236 at the 2020 census.

== History ==
The community began as a small retirement community near Lake Norfork following completion of the Norfork Dam. Initially an unincorporated area, residents voted to incorporate as a town in 1997. In 2000, town residents approved upgrading Briarcliff's status to a second-class city in order to establish a municipal government.

== Geography ==
According to the United States Census Bureau, the town has a total area of 4.7 km^{2} (1.8 sq mi), all land.

=== List of highways ===
- Arkansas Highway 5
- Arkansas Highway 342

== School district ==
Briarcliff is in the Norfork School District, with students graduating from Norfork High School.

== Demographics ==
Historical population
Census	Pop.	Note	%±
2000	240		—
2010	236		−1.7%
2020	236		0.0%
2025 (est.)	260	▲	10.2%
U.S. Decennial Census

As of the census of 2000, there were 240 people, 98 households, and 68 families residing in the town. The population density was50.9 people /km^{2} (132 people/mi^{2}). There were 117 housing units at an average density of 24.8 units /km^{2} (64 units/mi^{2}). The racial makeup of the town was 97.92% White, 0.83% Native American, and 1.25% from two or more races.

There were 98 households, out of which 32.7% had children under the age of 18 living with them, 56.1% were married couples living together, 10.2% had a female householder with no husband present, and 30.6% were non-families. 29.6% of all households were made up of individuals, and 14.3% had someone living alone who was 65 years of age or older. The average household size was 2.45 and the average family size was 2.94.

In the town the population was spread out, with 29.2% under the age of 18, 7.5% from 18 to 24, 22.1% from 25 to 44, 24.6% from 45 to 64, and 16.7% who were 65 years of age or older. The median age was 38 years. For every 100 females, there were 101.7 males. For every 100 females age 18 and over, there were 104.8 males.

The median income for a household in the town was $26,875, and the median income for a family was $32,188. Males had a median income of $26,000 versus $16,250 for females. The per capita income for the town was $16,420. About 9.0% of families and 13.7% of the population were below the poverty line, including 21.7% of those under the age of eighteen and 5.1% of those 65 or over.
