= Poor Joe =

Poor Joe may refer to:

- Poor Joe, common name for the plant Hexasepalum teres
- "Poor Joe", a song from the Oscar Hammerstein II 1947 musical Allegro
- "Poor Joe", a song written by Brandon/Kosloff recorded in 1961 by Jeri Lynne Fraser
- "Poor Joe", a song written by Robert Duke and recorded in 1962 by both Cliff Bennett and the Rebel Rousers and Carter-Lewis and the Southerners
- "Poor Joe", a song written by Joe Willoughby and recorded in 1964 by Dizzy Gillespie for the album Jambo Caribe
- "Poor Joe", a song written 1962–1966 by Irving Berlin
- The Death of Poor Joe, 1901 British short film directed by George Albert Smith

== See also ==
- Poor Old Joe
