= Buford, Arkansas =

Unincorporated community in Arkansas, US

Coordinates: 36°14′44″N 92°25′43″W

Buford is an unincorporated community in Baxter County, Arkansas, United States. It is the location of (or is the nearest community to) the Buford School Building, which is located on AR 126 and is listed on the National Register of Historic Places.
