= Case Brothers Historic District =

Historic district in Connecticut, United States

- U.S. National Register of Historic Places
- U.S. Historic district
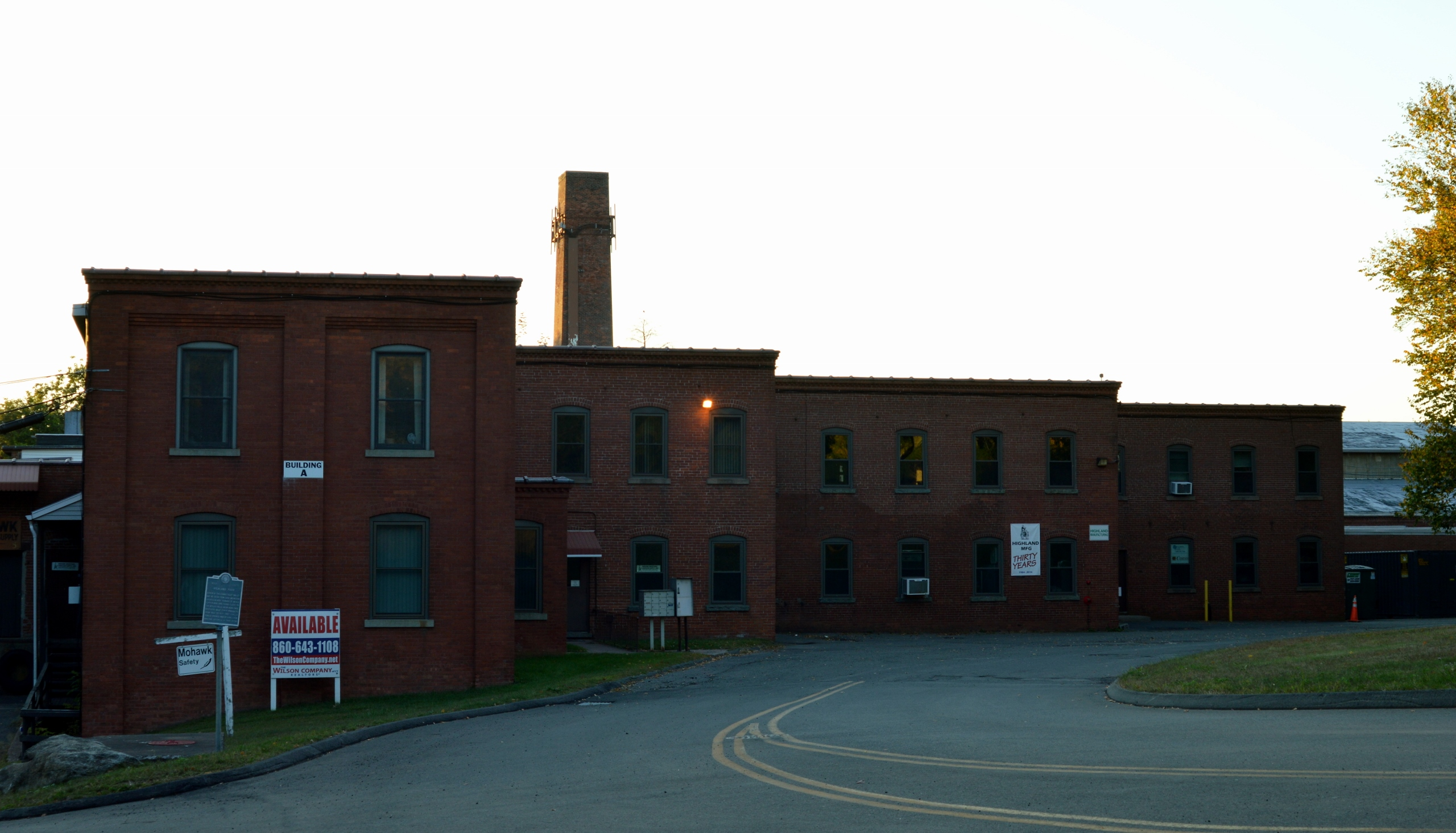

- Location within Connecticut Location within the United States
- Location: 680-728 Spring Street, 40 Glen Road, and rough boundaries of Case Mountain Recreation Area and Manchester Land, Manchester, Connecticut
- Coordinates: 41°45′46″N 72°29′20″W
- Area: 435 acres (176 ha)
- Architectural style: Late 19th And 20th Century Revivals, Rustic
- NRHP reference No.: 09000468
- Added to NRHP: June 30, 2009

The Case Brothers Historic District encompasses a complex of homes, business, and recreational properties belonging to a prominent papermaking family in Manchester, Connecticut. The Case family owned and operated a paper mill from 1862 until 1967, built architecturally sophisticated residences, and minimally developed what is now the Case Mountain Recreation Area, a rustic public park in southeastern Manchester. Their properties were listed on the National Register of Historic Places in 2009.

== Description and history ==
The Case Brothers Historic District is located in southeastern Manchester, isolated to some degree from the rest of the city by Interstate 384 to the northwest, and from other development by the rough terrain of Case Mountain to the south. The district includes a brick and wood-frame mill complex, dams and bridges built by the Case Brothers across Birch Mountain Brook that resulted in the creation of Upper and Lower Case Ponds, and the two handsome residential estates of Alfred Wells Case and Albert Willard Case. The two houses, at 673 and 680 Spring Street, are walking distance to the brothers' mill, which stands near the outlet of Lower Case Pond. Both houses were built in the 1860s and were originally fully Italianate in style, but were both extensively restyled in the early 20th century. One was given a Mediterranean Revival style, with a stuccoed exterior, and the other was transformed into a Colonial Revival mansion.

The twin Case brothers both learned the papermaking trade in plants on the Hockanum River. Recognizing business opportunities created by the American Civil War, they established their own paper facility at this location in 1862. The enclave of family houses was developed beginning in 1869. Over the next several decades, the brothers expanded their land holdings and business interests, building a nearly self-contained mill community then known as Highland Park. The company was passed on to the next generation (the brothers dying in 1908 and 1925), and survived the Great Depression. The family sold the paper business to Boise Cascade in 1967, which continued to operate on the site until 1973. The principal residences have also been sold out of the family. The informal park that the Cases created on Case Mountain is now a patchwork of land owned by the city and by a local conservation trust.

== See also ==
- National Register of Historic Places listings in Hartford County, Connecticut
