= Jacob Wolf House =

Historic house in Arkansas, United States

- U.S. National Register of Historic Places
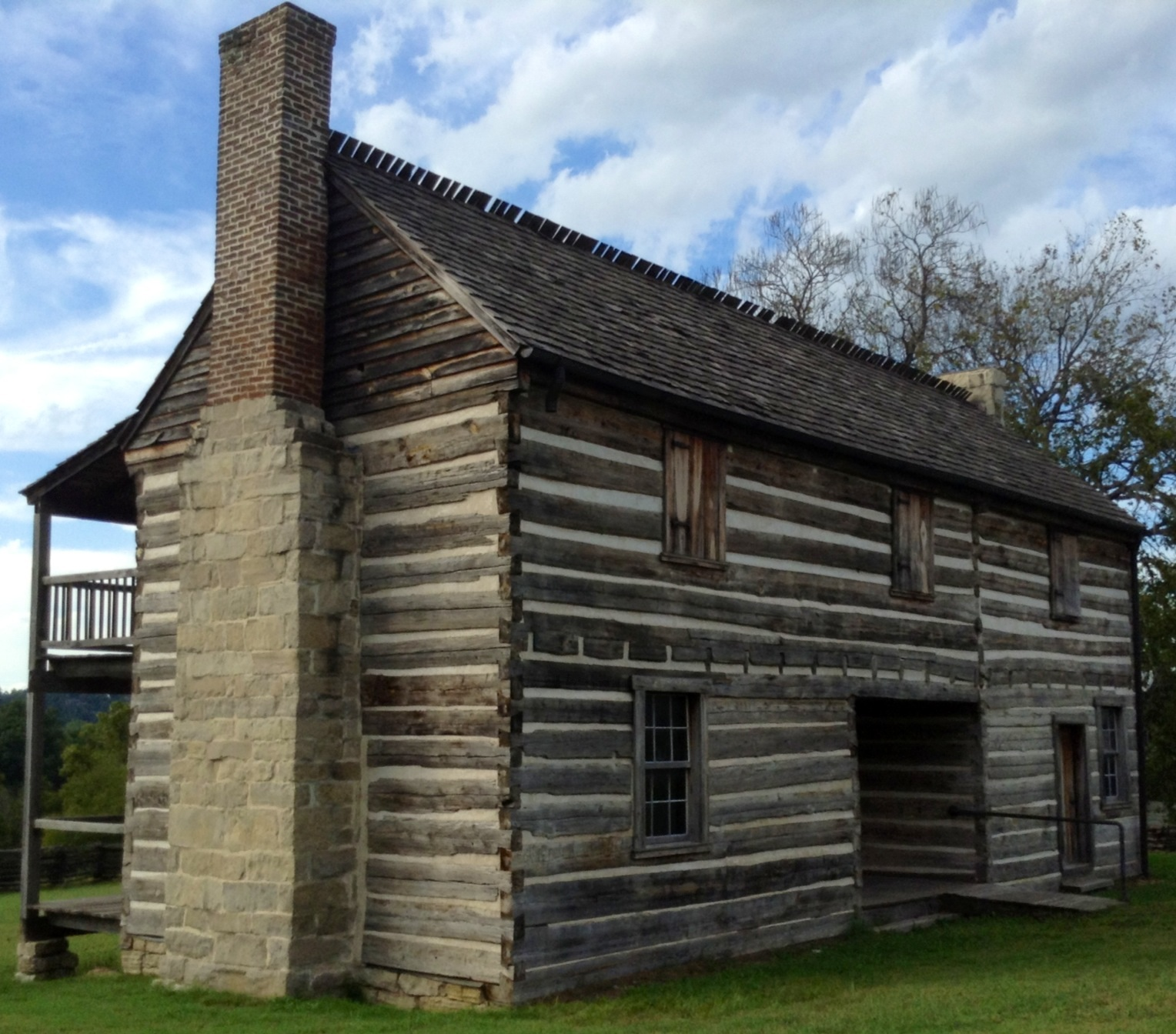

- Location within Arkansas Location within the United States
- Location: On AR 5, E of fork of the White and North Fork Rivers, Norfork, Arkansas
- Coordinates: 36°12′37″N 92°17′11″W
- Area: 0 acres (0 ha)
- Built: 1825
- Built by: Jacob Wolf
- Architectural style: Saddle-Bag
- NRHP reference No.: 73000380
- Added to NRHP: April 13, 1973

The Jacob Wolf House is a historic house on Arkansas Highway 5 in Norfork, Arkansas. It is a log structure, built in 1825 by Jacob Wolf, the first documented white settler of the area. Architecturally it's a "saddle bag", which is a two-story dog trot with the second floor built over the open breezeway. A two-story porch extends on one facade, with an outside stair giving access to the upper floor rooms. The building's original chinking has been replaced by modern mortaring. It is maintained by the Department of Arkansas Heritage as a historic house museum.

The house was listed on the National Register of Historic Places in 1973.

== Gallery ==
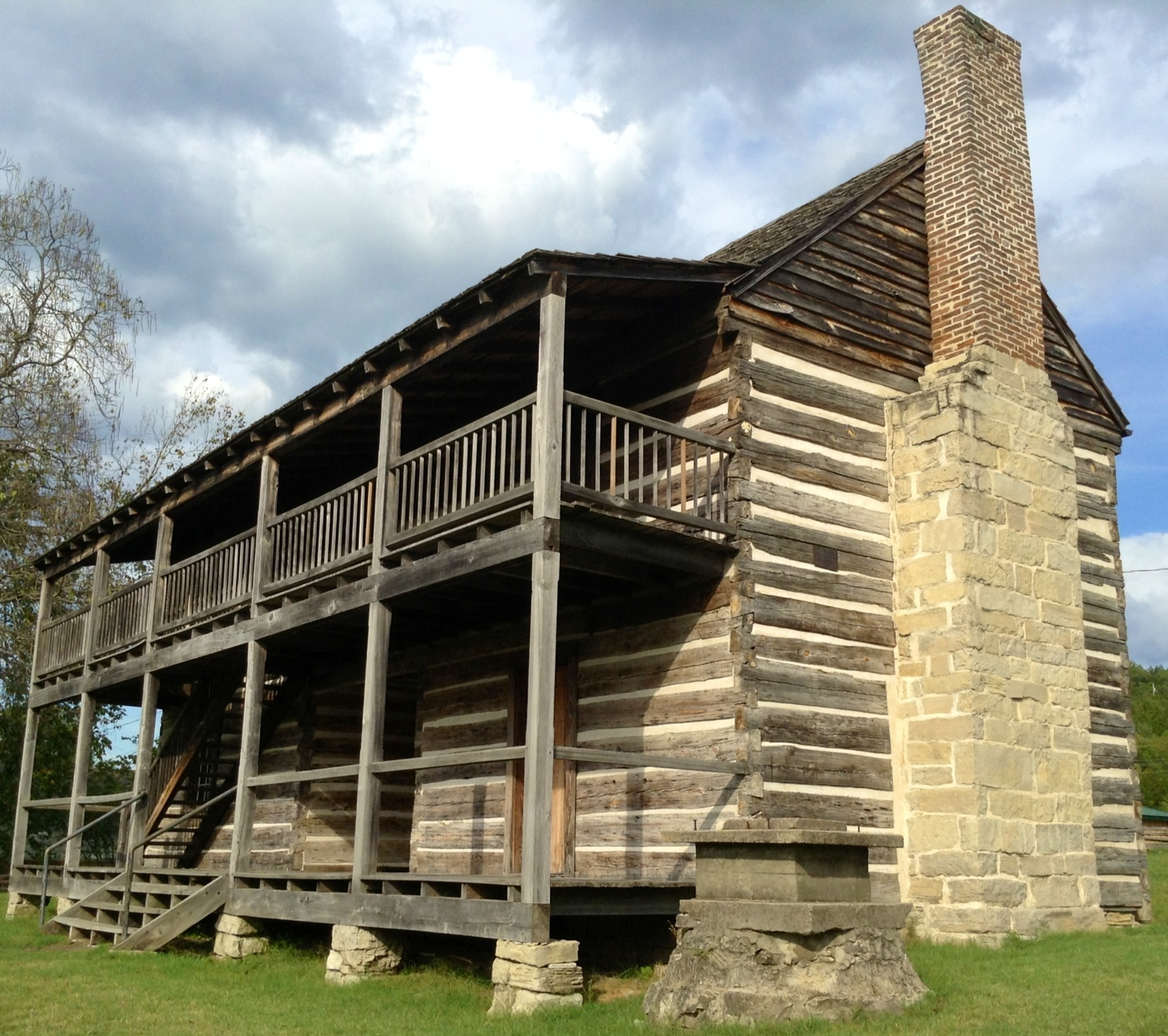
Back of Wolf House

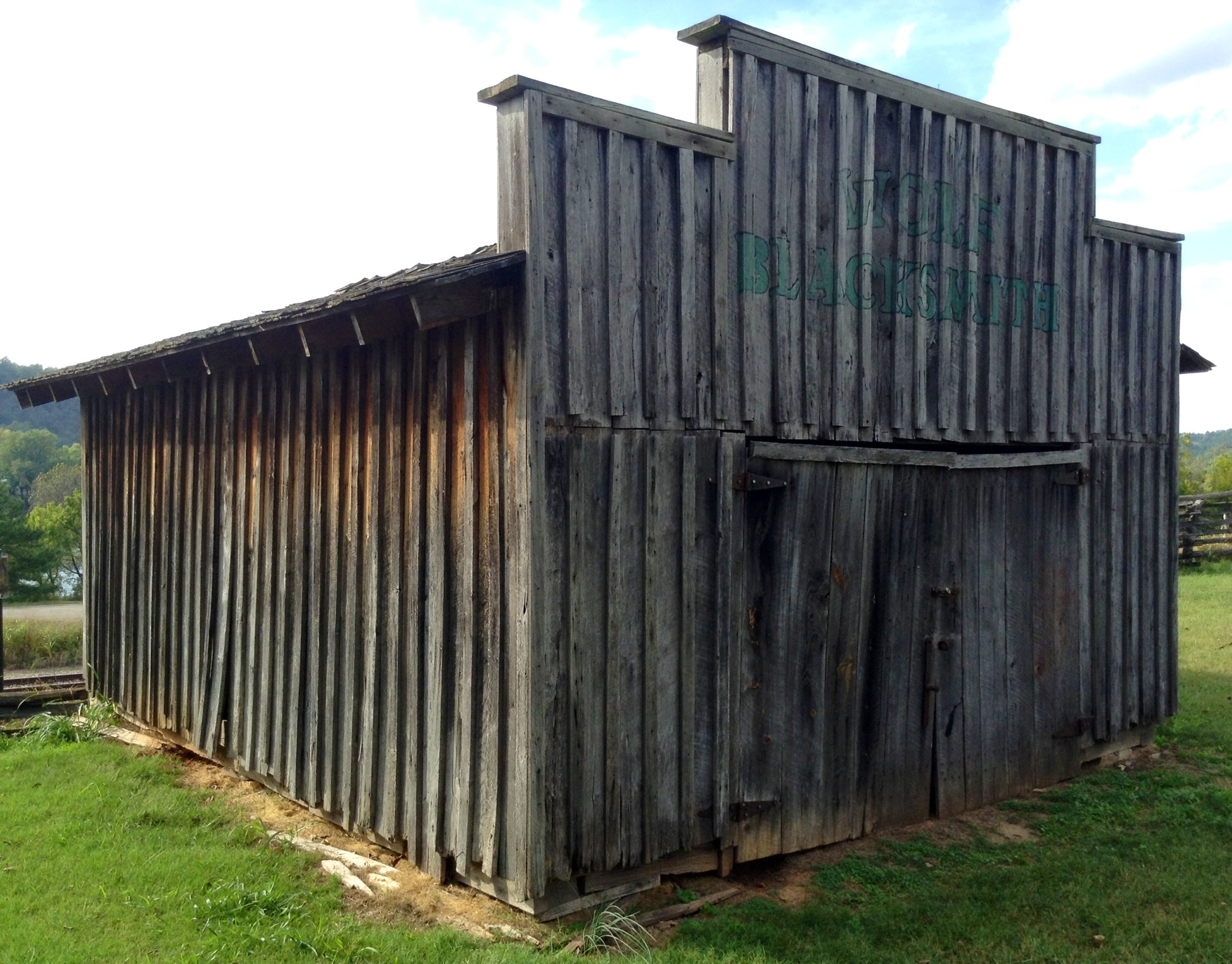
Blacksmith Shop

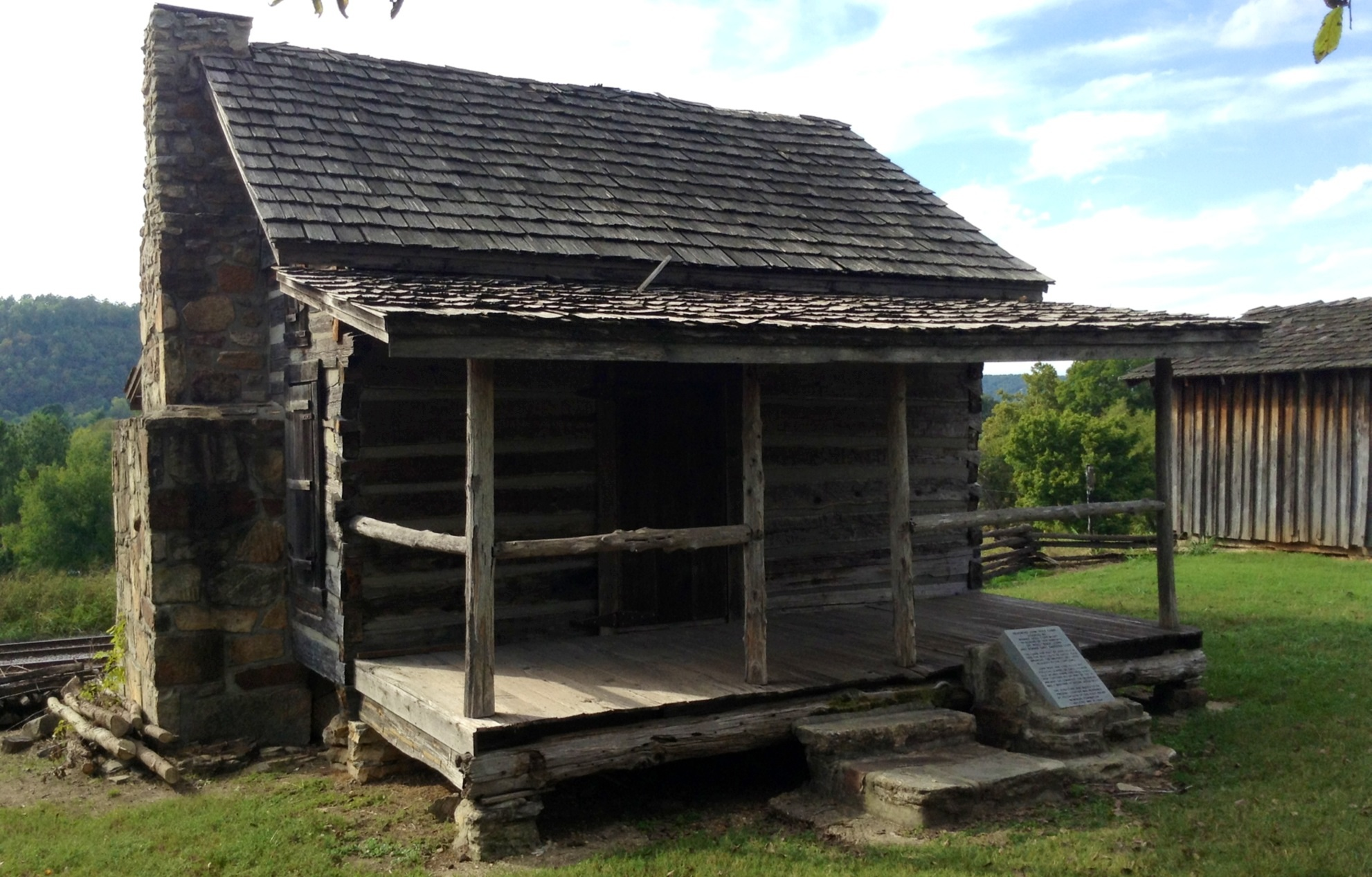
John Wolf Cabin built in 1828

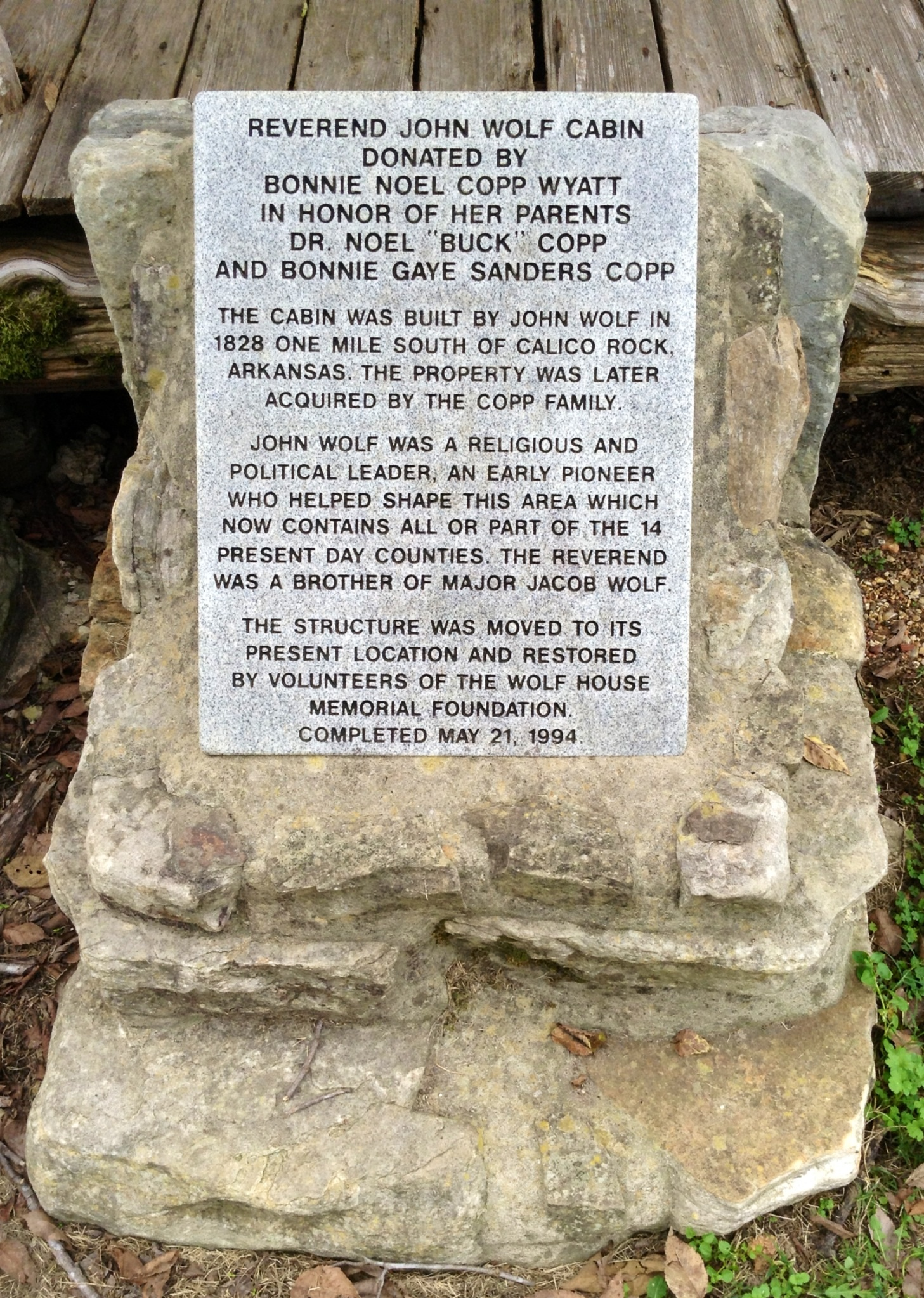
Plaque at John Wolf Cabin

== See also ==
- National Register of Historic Places listings in Baxter County, Arkansas
- List of the oldest buildings in Arkansas
