= KPFM (FM) =

- Mountain Home, Arkansas; United States
- Frequency: 105.5 MHz
- Branding: Country 105.5

Programming
- Format: Country
- Affiliations: Premiere Networks; Performance Racing Network

Ownership
- Owner: Mountain Home Radio Station, Inc.
- Sister stations: KKTZ, KOMT

Technical information
- Licensing authority: FCC
- Facility ID: 44022
- Class: C2
- ERP: 50,000 watts
- HAAT: 243.0 meters (797.2 ft)
- Transmitter coordinates: 36°29′13″N 92°29′39″W

Links
- Public license information: Public file; LMS
- Webcast: Listen Live
- Website: KPFM Online

KPFM (105.5 MHz) is an FM radio station broadcasting a country music format. Licensed to Mountain Home, Arkansas, United States. The station is currently owned by Mountain Home Radio Station, Inc.
