= Mountain Home, Arkansas =

City in Arkansas, United States

- City
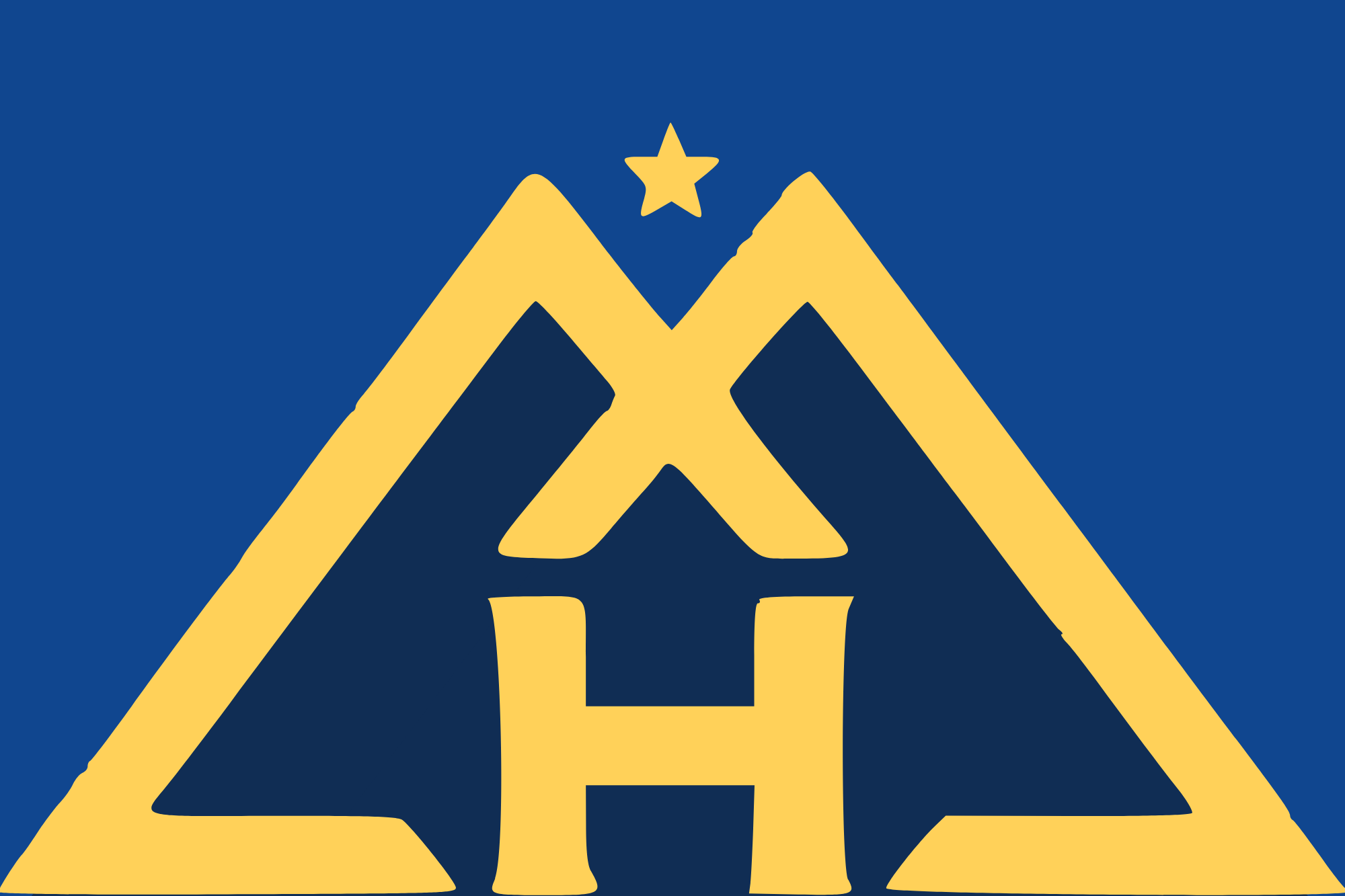
- Flag Logo

- Location of Mountain Home in Baxter County, Arkansas.
- Coordinates: 36°20′10″N 92°22′56″W
- Country: United States
- State: Arkansas
- County: Baxter

Area
  - City: 11.97 sq mi (30.99 km^{2})
  - Land: 11.97 sq mi (30.99 km^{2})
  - Water: 0 sq mi (0.00 km^{2})
- Elevation: 814 ft (248 m)

Population (2020)
  - City: 12,825
  - Estimate (2025): 13,373 ▲
  - Density: 1,071.8/sq mi (413.81/km^{2})
  - Metro: 41,307
- Demonym: Mountain Homie
- Time zone: UTC-6 (Central (CST))
  - Summer (DST): UTC-5 (CDT)
- ZIP codes: 72653-72654
- Area code: 870
- FIPS code: 05-47390
- GNIS feature ID: 2404330
- Website: www.mountainhomear.gov

Mountain Home is a city in and the county seat of Baxter County, Arkansas, United States, in the southern Ozark Mountains near the northern state border with Missouri. As of the 2020 census, Mountain Home had a population of 12,825. A total of 41,307 persons lived within the city and micropolitan area combined, which encompasses the majority of Baxter County.

== History ==
=== Founding and early days ===
Mountain Home was originally known as Rapp's Barren. The land was owned by Simeon "Rapp" Talburt, who built the first home in the area in the early 1830s. Rapp and many of his family members are buried in a small cemetery in the Indian Creek subdivision of Mountain Home. The original cabin was found in 1990 and is on display in Cooper Park in Mountain Home with other homes of historic value. The name of the town was changed to Mountain Home in 1856. A post office was established in 1857. The Mountain Home Male and Female Academy was opened in 1853 and provided much needed education in the absence of accessible public schools.

=== The courthouse ===
When Baxter County was incorporated on March 24, 1873, Mountain Home was named as the county seat. Court was held in a local store and prisoners were held in the homes of respected citizens until a proper courthouse could be built. A former boardinghouse was purchased for the purpose, but was deemed unfit for county business during the renovation process, so a new wood-frame building was built on a donated lot in the middle of the town square. This building burned to the ground in the 1890s and was replaced with a stone courthouse. It was suspected that an arsonist set fire to the building due to the location of the start of the fire and the timing. In just a few days, the fireproof safe would have been completed and all county records, including indictments, would have been protected from fire. In 1912, a local town, Cotter, was booming while growth in Mountain Home had slowed, and there was talk of moving the county seat to the riverfront town. Mountain Home added a third floor to their existing court house due to an Arkansas law that required the courthouse to be a three-story building. The current court house was completed in 1943 and is still in use today.

=== Civil War ===
Mountain Home men participated in the war on the confederate side. No major battles were fought in Mountain Home, but because of its proximity to Missouri, members of the union army would often raid the area for supplies and both sides participated in guerilla warfare. During this time, the Mountain Home Male and Female Academy was closed. In October 1862, the 14th regiment of the Missouri State Militia was ordered to advance to Yellville, Arkansas a town not far away, to attack confederate troops stationed there and to take any supplies they could along the way. When they heard that a larger force of confederate soldiers were also heading for Yellville, and facing the rising waters of the White River, they decided to content themselves with stealing approximately 50 horses and other supplies from local settlers in the Mountain Home area and then retreat. The rear guard was cut off by a battalion of confederate soldiers and a skirmish ensued where the Union Army lost no soldiers and the Confederate Army lost approximately 10.

In April 1864, Mountain Home was again involved with Civil war violence when a group of jayhawkers attacked the town. Much of the town was damaged or destroyed, including the Mountain Home Male and Female Academy.

=== Post Civil War through the 1920s ===
In 1893, the Mountain Home Baptist college, known as "The Gem of the Ozarks", opened. It operated for 40 years, offering education in French, Greek, Shorthand and typing as well as teacher training. Most of the money required to open it was raised locally. It closed occasionally due to lack of funds. In 1901, it became part of the Ouachita Baptist University system. In 1916 it became the flagship of the schools operated in Arkansas by the Southern Baptist Convention. By 1927 there were 265 students and a 7000 volume library. In 1927, funding was withdrawn to support a more centralized school in Conway and by 1933, the school was closed. The library was donated to the local public library and public schools and the dormitories became housing for the Dam builders. In 1901, the Baxter Bulletin was established and continues to operate today.

=== The Great Depression ===
The Great Depression hit the area hard, causing many local farmers to lose their land and leave. A series of natural disasters also caused hardship in the area including the Flood of 1927 and the drought of 1930–31. Cotton had been one of the main crops in the area before this, but the drought ended production of cotton in Baxter county and it never truly resumed. Residents received some relief from New Deal programs such as the Federal Emergency Relief Agency (FERA) and the Civilian Conservation Corps. The Works Progress Administration transformed transportation in the area throughout the 1930s and 1940s.

=== The New Deal ===
The programs of the New Deal era allowed Mountain Home to modernize its courthouse. The decision to do this was hotly contested and in a vote to decide if the funds should be approved, 731 voted for the new courthouse and 592 voted against. Most of those against the new courthouse were from the Cotter area which had tried several times to move the county seat to their town. The current courthouse was completed and dedicated on August 13, 1943, the old building having been destroyed two years earlier. The WPA also built two dams in the area during this time. The Norfork Dam was built in the town of Norfork about 18 miles south east of Mountain Home. This dam was completed by 1944. An average of 815 were employed building the dam, providing a much needed economic boost to Mountain home and the surrounding area. In addition to flood control, the Norfork Dam boosted tourist interest in Baxter County and made Mountain Home a more attractive destination than Cotter for the first time, and Mountain Home began to surpass its riverfront neighbor in population and industry. A second dam had been built in the town of Bull Shoals in nearby Marion County. This meant Mountain Home was situated between two large lakes and within an easy drive to one of the most famous destinations for fishing in the country at that time. Tourism would shape the economy of Mountain Home moving forward. President Harry Truman was the keynote speaker at the dedication of the dams on July 2, 1952.

The construction of these two dams was a time of tremendous growth for the formerly isolated community of Mountain Home. Streets were paved and Electricity became common in average households. A trout fishery was built at the base of the Norfork Dam, attracting still more tourists.

== Geography ==
Mountain Home is located in northern Arkansas at 36°20′10″N 92°22′56″W (36.336248, -92.382279). It is the center of the Twin Lakes area, with Norfork Lake 15 minutes to the east and Bull Shoals Lake 20 minutes to the northwest. It is located within the Ozarks mountain range, in the Salem Plateau region.

The city is located within 15 to 20 minutes of three rivers: the Buffalo National River, the White River and the North Fork River, which features the world-renowned Norfork Tailwater. These make the Mountain Home area one of the nation's top freshwater fishing destinations. According to the United States Census Bureau, the city has a total area of 11.7 square miles (30.4 km^{2}), all land.

=== Climate ===
Mountain Home has a humid subtropical climate (Köppen climate classification Cfa), with cool to mild winters and warm, humid summers.

Climate data for Mountain Home, Arkansas, 1991–2020 normals, extremes 1902–present
Month	Jan	Feb	Mar	Apr	May	Jun	Jul	Aug	Sep	Oct	Nov	Dec	Year
Record high °F (°C)	83 (28)	88 (31)	94 (34)	95 (35)	101 (38)	110 (43)	112 (44)	114 (46)	107 (42)	97 (36)	87 (31)	84 (29)	114 (46)
Mean maximum °F (°C)	69.2 (20.7)	73.6 (23.1)	80.5 (26.9)	84.8 (29.3)	88.7 (31.5)	93.2 (34.0)	97.0 (36.1)	98.1 (36.7)	93.2 (34.0)	86.6 (30.3)	76.6 (24.8)	69.2 (20.7)	99.5 (37.5)
Mean daily maximum °F (°C)	45.8 (7.7)	50.8 (10.4)	59.8 (15.4)	69.7 (20.9)	76.9 (24.9)	85.0 (29.4)	89.4 (31.9)	89.1 (31.7)	82.0 (27.8)	71.3 (21.8)	58.9 (14.9)	48.5 (9.2)	68.9 (20.5)
Daily mean °F (°C)	36.0 (2.2)	40.0 (4.4)	48.6 (9.2)	58.1 (14.5)	66.3 (19.1)	74.9 (23.8)	79.1 (26.2)	78.3 (25.7)	70.9 (21.6)	59.7 (15.4)	48.2 (9.0)	38.9 (3.8)	58.3 (14.6)
Mean daily minimum °F (°C)	26.1 (−3.3)	29.3 (−1.5)	37.3 (2.9)	46.4 (8.0)	55.6 (13.1)	64.7 (18.2)	68.8 (20.4)	67.5 (19.7)	59.7 (15.4)	48.0 (8.9)	37.4 (3.0)	29.3 (−1.5)	47.5 (8.6)
Mean minimum °F (°C)	9.1 (−12.7)	13.0 (−10.6)	20.5 (−6.4)	32.4 (0.2)	41.4 (5.2)	55.1 (12.8)	61.2 (16.2)	58.6 (14.8)	45.9 (7.7)	32.5 (0.3)	22.2 (−5.4)	14.0 (−10.0)	5.7 (−14.6)
Record low °F (°C)	−15 (−26)	−14 (−26)	−2 (−19)	21 (−6)	29 (−2)	42 (6)	46 (8)	47 (8)	32 (0)	18 (−8)	9 (−13)	−16 (−27)	−16 (−27)
Average precipitation inches (mm)	3.30 (84)	3.26 (83)	5.03 (128)	5.60 (142)	5.68 (144)	3.88 (99)	4.15 (105)	3.74 (95)	3.66 (93)	3.99 (101)	4.80 (122)	3.77 (96)	50.86 (1,292)
Average snowfall inches (cm)	1.9 (4.8)	2.6 (6.6)	2.0 (5.1)	0.0 (0.0)	0.0 (0.0)	0.0 (0.0)	0.0 (0.0)	0.0 (0.0)	0.0 (0.0)	0.1 (0.25)	0.0 (0.0)	1.2 (3.0)	7.8 (19.75)
Average precipitation days (≥ 0.01 in)	8.3	8.2	10.8	10.2	11.5	9.3	9.1	8.8	7.6	8.9	8.8	8.7	110.2
Average snowy days (≥ 0.1 in)	1.0	1.2	0.7	0.0	0.0	0.0	0.0	0.0	0.0	0.0	0.2	0.7	3.8
Source 1: NOAA
Source 2: National Weather Service

== Transportation ==
Highways in Mountain Home:

- US 62/US 412
- U.S. Route 62 Business
- Highway 5
- Highway 101
- Highway 178
- Highway 201
- Highway 201 Spur

The city is served by Ozark Regional Airport, a county-owned, public-use airport with a few commercial flights.

No railroads pass through Mountain Home, but the Missouri and Northern Arkansas Railroad passes through the nearby community of Cotter, Arkansas 10 miles (16 km) to the west. The line encompasses 506 miles of track from Pleasant Hill, Missouri to Diaz Junction, Arkansas. The line has about five trains a day, with most being mixed freight or empty coal trains.

== Media ==
=== Print ===
The local newspaper is The Baxter Bulletin, published since 1901. It also publishes "Living Well Magazine."

=== Radio ===
KTLO AM 1240 was established in 1953. Others include KTLO Radio (which includes 99.7 FM The Boot, KCTT Classic Hits 101.7 FM, and KTLO 1240 AM Real Country) and Twin Lakes Radio (which includes KOMT The Eagle 93.5 FM, KPFM Country 105.5 FM, and KKTZ Hit 107.5 FM. KCMH 91.5 FM (a Christian radio) is also licensed to the city of Mountain Home. Several other stations are licensed to surrounding communities and serve Baxter County.

=== Television ===
K26GS-D operates KL7 in Mountain Home on public access and provides local interest pieces and news. Mountain Home is part of the Springfield television market.

=== Theater ===
Mountain Home has a live theater known as the Twin Lakes Playhouse, which opened in 1971 and has operated continuously since then.

== Demographics ==
Historical population
Census	Pop.	Note	%±
1880	137		—
1890	242		76.6%
1900	363		50.0%
1910	446		22.9%
1920	492		10.3%
1930	585		18.9%
1940	927		58.5%
1950	2,217		139.2%
1960	2,105		−5.1%
1970	3,936		87.0%
1980	8,066		104.9%
1990	9,027		11.9%
2000	11,012		22.0%
2010	12,448		13.0%
2020	12,825		3.0%
2025 (est.)	13,373	▲	4.3%
U.S. Decennial Census

=== 2020 census ===
As of the 2020 census, Mountain Home had a population of 12,825. The median age was 49.1 years. 18.4% of residents were under the age of 18 and 32.1% of residents were 65 years of age or older. For every 100 females there were 86.1 males, and for every 100 females age 18 and over there were 81.4 males age 18 and over.

96.4% of residents lived in urban areas, while 3.6% lived in rural areas.

There were 6,073 households in Mountain Home, and 3,225 families residing in the city. Of all households, 21.6% had children under the age of 18 living in them, 37.7% were married-couple households, 19.1% were households with a male householder and no spouse or partner present, and 37.0% were households with a female householder and no spouse or partner present. About 40.2% of all households were made up of individuals and 24.3% had someone living alone who was 65 years of age or older.

There were 6,602 housing units, of which 8.0% were vacant. The homeowner vacancy rate was 2.4% and the rental vacancy rate was 7.8%.

Mountain Home racial composition
Race	Number	Percentage
White (non-Hispanic)	11,610	90.53%
Black or African American (non-Hispanic)	49	0.38%
Native American	58	0.45%
Asian	130	1.01%
Pacific Islander	1	0.01%
Other/Mixed	543	4.23%
Hispanic or Latino	434	3.38%

=== 2010 census ===
According to the 2010 census, the population of Mountain Home was 12,448.

=== 2000 census ===
As of the census of 2000, there were 11,012 people, 5,175 households, and 3,151 families residing in the city. The population density was 1,035.7 inhabitants per square mile (399.9/km^{2}). There were 5,612 housing units at an average density of 527.8 per square mile (203.8/km^{2}). The racial makeup of the city was 97.69% White, 0.18% Black or African American, 0.47% Native American, 0.37% Asian, 0.03% Pacific Islander, 0.26% from other races, and 0.99% from two or more races. 1.20% of the population were Hispanic or Latino of any race.

There were 5,175 households, out of which 19.9% had children under the age of 18 living with them, 49.3% were married couples living together, 9.6% had a female householder with no husband present, and 39.1% were non-families. 36.3% of all households were made up of individuals, and 22.8% had someone living alone who was 65 years of age or older. The average household size was 2.02 and the average family size was 2.59.

In the city, the population was spread out, with 17.7% under the age of 18, 5.9% from 18 to 24, 18.8% from 25 to 44, 21.5% from 45 to 64, and 36.1% who were 65 years of age or older. The median age was 53 years. For every 100 females, there were 78.2 males. For every 100 females age 18 and over, there were 74.3 males.

The median income for a household in the city was $26,869, and the median income for a family was $34,895. Males had a median income of $26,800 versus $19,702 for females. The per capita income for the city was $16,789. About 7.5% of families and 10.6% of the population were below the poverty line, including 14.6% of those under age 18 and 7.1% of those age 65 or over.

== Education ==
=== ASU – Mountain Home ===
Arkansas State University-Mountain Home is a public, open-access, two-year campus of Arkansas State University located on a campus on the west side of the city. The campus became part of the ASU system in 1995. The campus architecture is styled after the University of Virginia.

=== Mountain Home school district ===
Mountain Home School District has seven campuses and owns 330 square miles (850 km^{2}). It serves more than 4,000 students from kindergarten through 12th grade.

The Mountain Home High School plays in the 6A/7A East Athletic Conference in basketball, football, baseball, softball, track and field, soccer, wrestling, cross country, volleyball and swimming. The cross country teams won multiple state championships and the swim and volleyball teams competed for state championships.

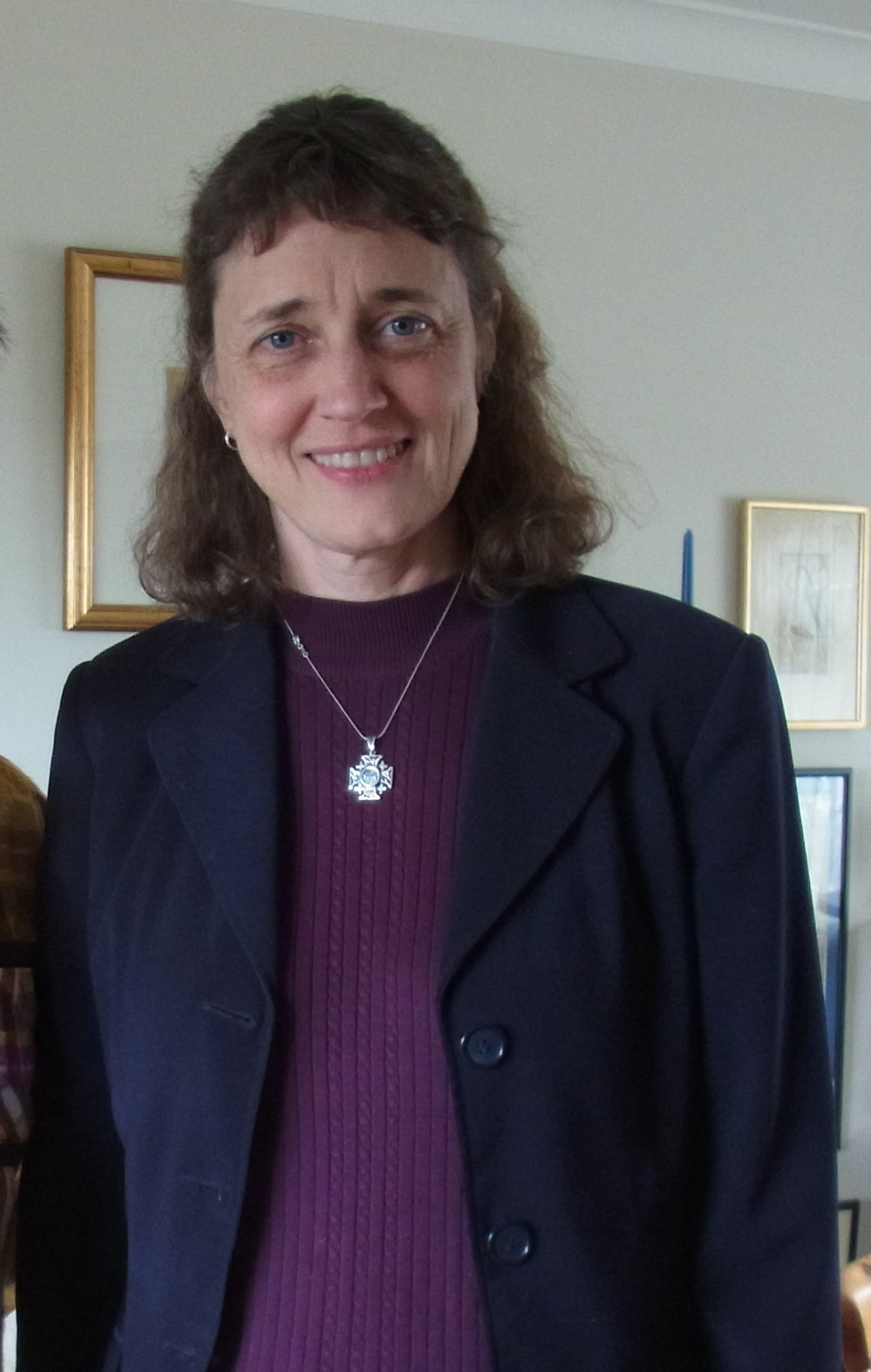
Senior Project Scientist of the Hubble Space Telescope, Jennifer Wiseman

The school band marched in the 2006 Macy's Thanksgiving Day Parade, the 2010 Citrus Bowl Parade, and competed at Disney World in 2019. The Jazz Band performs shows in Branson, Missouri.

The robotics program placed in the top three of the FIRST Championship (FRC) multiple times, and won the FRC world championship in 2012.

== Notable people ==
- Richard Antrim, rear admiral in the U.S. Navy; World War II veteran.
- Charles L. Gilliland, Medal of Honor recipient during the Korean War.
- Mike Koch, racing driver
- William U. McCabe, represented Baxter County in the Arkansas Senate from 1921 to 1924, and in the Arkansas House of Representatives in 1931 until his death
- Stetson Painter, Member of the Arkansas House of Representatives
- Gaylen Pitts, Major League baseball player; manager and coach
- Jennifer Wiseman, Senior Project Scientist of the Hubble Space Telescope, astronomer, discoverer of Comet Wiseman-Skiff
- C. D. Wright, poet
- Ron "Wolverine" Bata, Power Slap Light heavyweight champion
