= Norfork, Arkansas =

- City
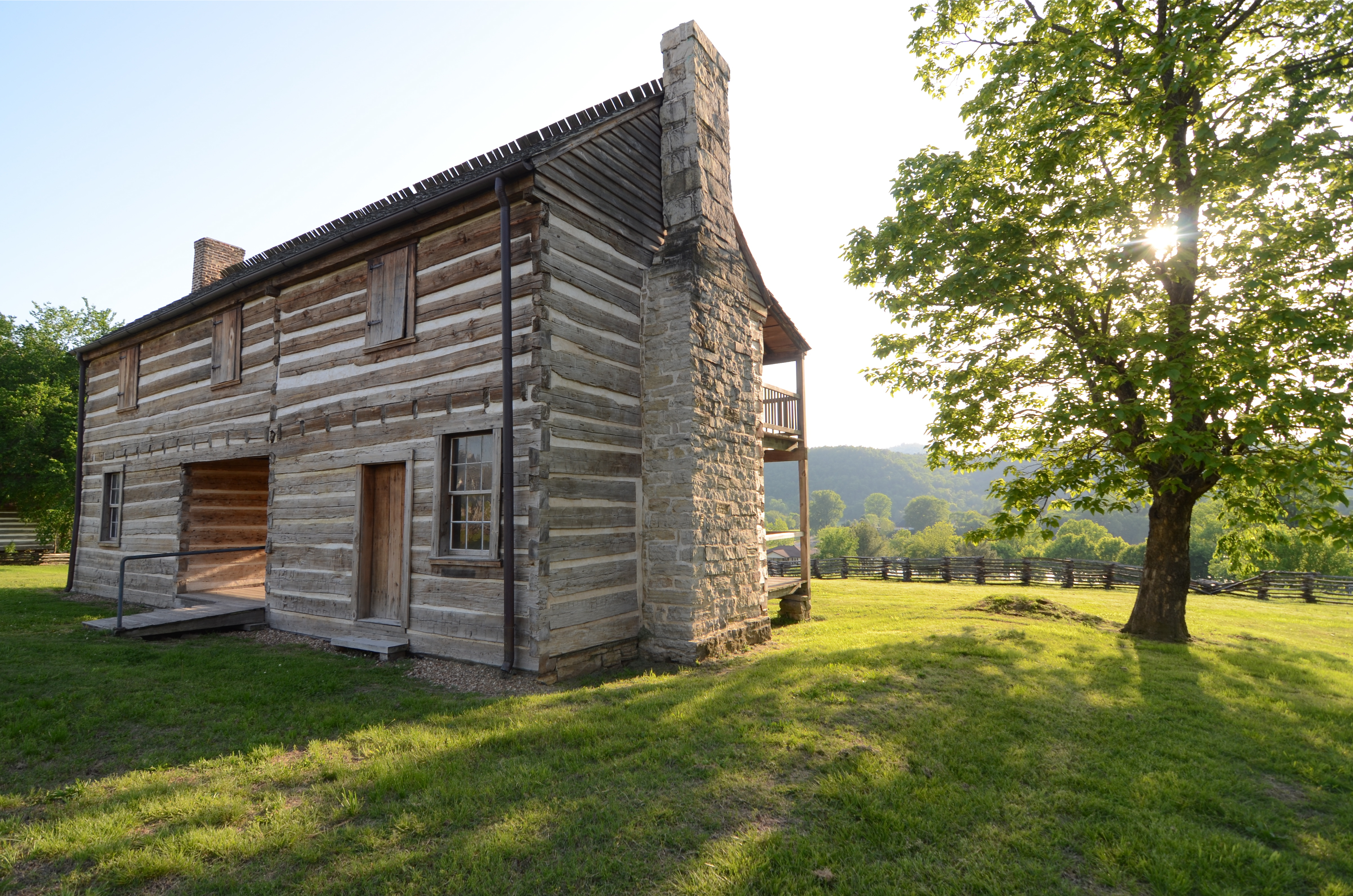
- Jacob Wolf House, one of the oldest buildings in Arkansas (1829)

- Seal

- Location of Norfork in Baxter County, Arkansas.
- Coordinates: 36°12′35″N 92°16′49″W
- Country: United States
- State: Arkansas
- County: Baxter

Government

Area
  - Total: 2.41 sq mi (6.24 km^{2})
  - Land: 2.22 sq mi (5.76 km^{2})
  - Water: 0.19 sq mi (0.48 km^{2})
- Elevation: 479 ft (146 m)

Population (2020)
  - Total: 465
  - Estimate (2025): 482 ▲
  - Density: 209.0/sq mi (80.68/km^{2})
- Time zone: UTC-6 (Central (CST))
  - Summer (DST): UTC-5 (CDT)
- ZIP codes: 72658-72659
- Area code: 870
- FIPS code: 05-50000
- GNIS feature ID: 2404385
- Website: cityofnorfork.org

Norfork is a city in Baxter County, Arkansas, United States. As of the 2020 census, Norfork had a population of 465.

== Geography ==
According to the United States Census Bureau, the city has a total area of 2.5 square miles (6.5 km^{2}), of which 2.2 square miles (5.7 km^{2}) is land and 0.3 square miles (0.78 km^{2}) (11.74%) is water.

The White River flows 44 miles from Bull Shoals Dam to its confluence with the North Fork River's tailwater at Norfork.

=== List Of Highways ===
- Arkansas Highway 5
- Arkansas Highway 177

== Demographics ==
Historical population
Census	Pop.	Note	%±
1920	224		—
1930	247		10.3%
1940	304		23.1%
1950	431		41.8%
1960	283		−34.3%
1970	266		−6.0%
1980	399		50.0%
1990	394		−1.3%
2000	484		22.8%
2010	511		5.6%
2020	465		−9.0%
2025 (est.)	482	▲	3.7%
U.S. Decennial Census

As of the census of 2000, the population density was 221.5 inhabitants per square mile (85.5/km^{2}). There were 283 housing units at an average density of 129.5 per square mile (50.0/km^{2}). The racial makeup of the city was 96.07% White, 0.21% Black or African American, 1.50% Native American, 0.41% Asian, 0.41% from other races, and 1.45% from two or more races. 1.41% of the population were Hispanic or Latino of any race.

There were 224 households, out of which 17.0% had children under the age of 18 living with them, 58.5% were married couples living together, 8.5% had a female householder with no husband present, and 31.7% were non-families. 29.9% of all households were made up of individuals, and 14.7% had someone living alone who was 65 years of age or older. The average household size was 2.16 and the average family size was 2.65.

In the city the population was spread out, with 16.5% under the age of 18, 3.1% from 18 to 24, 16.9% from 25 to 44, 36.4% from 45 to 64, and 27.1% who were 65 years of age or older. The median age was 53 years. For every 100 females, there were 95.2 males. For every 100 females age 18 and over, there were 91.5 males.

The median income for a household in the city was $30,192, and the median income for a family was $34,375. Males had a median income of $23,750 versus $19,028 for females. The per capita income for the city was $16,671. About 7.5% of families and 13.0% of the population were below the poverty line, including 18.9% of those under age 18 and 16.5% of those age 65 or over.

== Education ==
Norfork is the home of the Norfork School District. Norfork High School was nationally recognized as a silver medalist and ranked No. 18 in Arkansas and No. 1,863 in the nation in the Best High Schools Report 2012 developed by U.S. News & World Report.

== Notable people ==
- Dan A. Sullivan, member of the Arkansas House of Representatives for Craighead and Greene counties
- Dan Fredinburg, Google executive
