= Auxiliary routes of Arkansas Highway 69 =

State highway in Arkansas, United States

Eight auxiliary routes of Arkansas Highway 69 currently exist. Four are spur routes, with four serving as business routes.

== Melbourne spur ==
Highway 69S
- Location: Melbourne
- Length: 2.53 mi (4.07 km)

Highway 69 Spur (AR 69S, Ark. 69S, or Hwy. 69S) is a spur route in Melbourne. The route is 2.53-mile (4.07 km) in length.

Route description

The route begins at Highway 69 in west Melbourne and runs east before turning north. The highway serves Melbourne Municipal Airport, where it ends at the terminal.

Major intersections

The entire route is in Melbourne, Izard County.

mi	km	Destinations	Notes
0.00	0.00	AR 69 (Main Street)	Southern terminus
2.53	4.07	Melbourne Municipal Airport	Northern terminus
1.000 mi = 1.609 km; 1.000 km = 0.621 mi

== Sage business route ==
Highway 69B
- Location: Sage
- Length: 2.88 mi (4.63 km)

Highway 69 Business (AR 69B, Ark. 69B, or Hwy. 69B) is a business route at Sage. The route is 2.88-mile (4.63 km) in length.

Route description

The route begins at Highway 69 just south of Melbourne and runs east before serving as the southern terminus for Highway 289 near Sage. Highway 69B turns south after sage and terminates at its parent at the start of the Highway 58/Highway 69 concurrency.

Major intersections

The entire route is in Izard County.

Location	mi	km	Destinations	Notes
Melbourne	0.00	0.00	AR 69	Western terminus
Sage	1.24	2.00	AR 289	AR 289 southern terminus
	2.88	4.63	AR 58 / AR 69	Eastern terminus
1.000 mi = 1.609 km; 1.000 km = 0.621 mi

== Batesville business route ==
Central Avenue/Harrison Street
- Location: Batesville
- Length: 2.25 mi (3.62 km)

Highway 69 Business (AR 69B, Ark. 69B, or Hwy. 69B) is a business route in Batesville. The route is 2.25-mile (3.62 km) in length.

Route description

The route begins at Highway 69 in northwest Batesville and runs south as Central Avenue. Highway 69B serves as the eastern terminus of Highway 106, passes the Luster Urban Farmstead (listed on the National Register of Historic Places [NRHP]) before crossing Polk Bayou on the Central Avenue Bridge, also NRHP-listed. The highway continues south along border of the Batesville Commercial Historic District before turning onto Boswell Street. Highway 69B runs past the historic Adler House before turning onto Harrison Street. Highway 69B continues along Harrison Street before terminating at U.S. Route 167/Highway 25/Highway 69 (US 167/AR 25/AR 69).

Major intersections

The entire route is in Batesville, Independence County.

mi	km	Destinations	Notes
0.00	0.00	AR 69 (White Drive)	Western terminus
0.90	1.45	AR 106 west (Bethesda Road)	AR 106 eastern terminus
1.24– 1.32	2.00– 2.12	Central Avenue Bridge over Polk Bayou	
2.88	4.63	US 167 / AR 25 / AR 69 (St. Louis Street)	Eastern terminus
1.000 mi = 1.609 km; 1.000 km = 0.621 mi

== Batesville spur ==
Highway 69S
- Location: Batesville
- Length: 1.4 mi (2.3 km)

Highway 69 Spur (AR 69S, Ark. 69S, or Hwy. 69S) is a spur route in Batesville. The route is 1.4-mile (2.3 km) in length.

Route description

The route begins at Highway 69 in Batesville and runs east to U.S. Route 167/Highway 25/Highway 69 (US 167/AR 25/AR 69).

Major intersections

The entire route is in Batesville, Independence County.

mi	km	Destinations	Notes
0.00	0.00	AR 69 (White Drive)	Western terminus
1.4	2.3	US 167 / AR 25	Eastern terminus
1.000 mi = 1.609 km; 1.000 km = 0.621 mi

== Sulphur Rock business route ==
Broadway/Main Street
- Location: Sulphur Rock
- Length: 1.38 mi (2.22 km)

Highway 69 Business (AR 69B, Ark. 69B, or Hwy. 69B) is a business route in Sulphur Rock. The route is 1.38-mile (2.22 km) in length.

Route description

The route begins at Highway 69 in northwest Sulphur Rock and runs southeast as Broadway. Highway 69B serves as the northern terminus of Highway 233 before turning south and terminating at the parent route.

Major intersections

The entire route is in Independence County.

Location	mi	km	Destinations	Notes
	0.00	0.00	AR 69	Western terminus
Sulphur Rock	0.84	1.35	AR 233 south (Wright Street)	AR 233 northern terminus
Sulphur Rock	1.38	2.22	AR 69	Eastern terminus
1.000 mi = 1.609 km; 1.000 km = 0.621 mi

== Newark business route ==
6th Street
- Location: Newark
- Length: 0.90 mi (1,450 m)

Highway 69 Business (AR 69B, Ark. 69B, or Hwy. 69B) is a business route in Newark. The route is 0.90-mile (1.45 km) in length. (Note: The Independence County Route and Section Map indicates that Highway 69 Section 3B begins in Sulphur Rock and ends in Newark with an officially designated exception over Highway 69 between miles 1.38-5.98. Although logged as one route, the routes are essentially two separate business routes divided by the overlap.)

Route description

The route begins at Highway 69 west of Newark and enters the city as 6th Street. Highway 69B serves as the southern terminus of Highway 233 and continues east to terminate at Highway 122.

Major intersections

The entire route is in Independence County.

Location	mi	km	Destinations	Notes
	0.00	0.00	AR 69	Western terminus
Newark	0.64	1.03	AR 233 north (Hill Street)	AR 233 southern terminus
Newark	0.90	1.45	AR 122	Eastern terminus
1.000 mi = 1.609 km; 1.000 km = 0.621 mi

== Jacksonport spur ==
Avenue Street
- Location: Jacksonport
- Length: 0.70 mi (1,130 m)

Highway 69 Spur (AR 69S, Ark. 69S, or Hwy. 69S) is a spur route in Jacksonport. The route is 0.70-mile (1.13 km) in length.

Route description

The route begins at Highway 69 in Jacksonport and runs southwest to as Avenue Street to Dillard Street at the edge of Jacksonport State Park.

Major intersections

The entire route is in Jackson County.

Location	mi	km	Destinations	Notes
	0.00	0.00	AR 69	Eastern terminus
Jacksonport	0.70	1.13	Jacksonport State Park	Western terminus
1.000 mi = 1.609 km; 1.000 km = 0.621 mi

== Trumann spur ==
Ozark Avenue
- Location: Trumann
- Length: 1.54 mi (2.48 km)

Highway 69 Spur (AR 69S, Ark. 69S, or Hwy. 69S) is a spur route in Trumann. The route is 1.54-mile (2.48 km) in length.

Route description

The route begins at Highway 69 in Trumann and runs south to as Ozark Avenue to Highway 463.

Major intersections

The entire route is in Trumann, Poinsett County.

mi	km	Destinations	Notes
0.00	0.00	AR 69	Northern terminus
1.54	2.48	AR 463	Southern terminus
1.000 mi = 1.609 km; 1.000 km = 0.621 mi
