= List of state highway spurs in Arkansas =

- Highway markers for AR 7S, AR 23S, and AR 137S

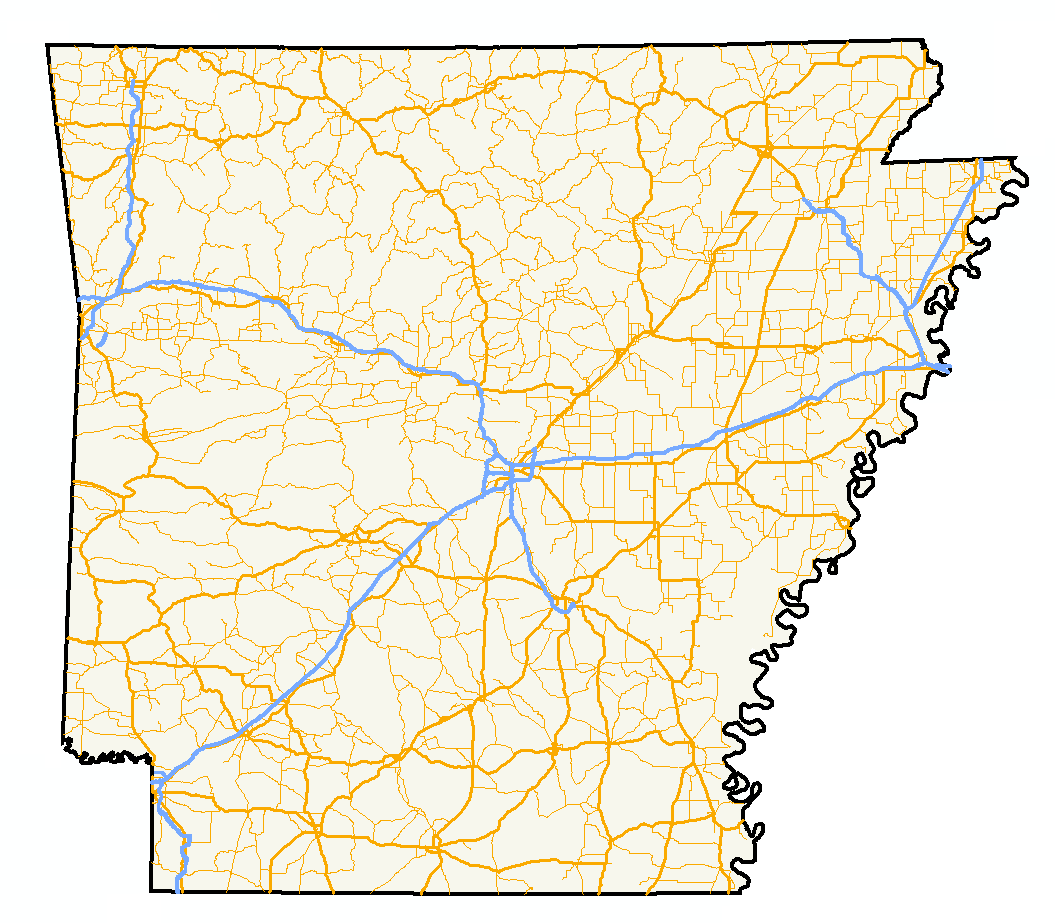
- A map of highways in the state of Arkansas

System information
- Formed: 1926
- State: Arkansas nnS, Highway nnS (AR nnS, Hwy. nnS)

System links
- Arkansas Highway System; Interstate; US; State; Business; Spurs; Suffixed; Scenic; Heritage

This is a list of state highway spur routes (spurs) in the U.S. state of Arkansas. The spurs are named after their parent highways, which leads to multiple designations of the same name in some cases. All spur routes are maintained by the Arkansas Department of Transportation (ArDOT).

== Shields ==
Arkansas spur shields are mostly the same as their parent highways, with merely the addition of an "S". The major change comes from two-digit spur routes being printed on 24-by-36-inch (61 cm × 91 cm) while the parent routes are on the square 24-by-24-inch (61 cm × 61 cm) shields.

Arkansas state highway spur routes are signed using standard state highway shield backgrounds. The number remains the same size and a "S" (for spur) is added in an almost-exponential format. Shield sizes remain, one-digit routes keep the 24-by-24-inch (61 cm × 61 cm) shields, while two-digit routes become 24-by-36-inch (61 cm × 91 cm). Three-digit routes are the same as the parent route with the "S" placed in the available corner space. The "Spur" banners are usually not used by ArDOT, which instead prefers to use only a direction banner.

== State highway spurs ==
| Number | Length (mi) | Length (km) | Southern or western terminus | Northern or eastern terminus | Formed | Removed | Notes |
|---|---|---|---|---|---|---|---|
| AR 1S | 0.49 | 0.79 | AR 1 in St. Charles | White River | — | — | |
| AR 4S | 1.01 | 1.63 | AR 4 in Arkansas City | Mississippi River levee | 1963 | current | |
| AR 4S | — | — | AR 4 in Camden | — | 1955 | 1976 | Supplanted by US 79 and AR 4 |
| AR 5S | 0.07 | 0.11 | AR 5 in Mountain Home | US 62 in Mountain Home | 1993 | current | |
| AR 7S | 0.29 | 0.47 | AR 7 in Marble Falls | Dogpatch USA | 1974 | current | |
| AR 7S | 2.39 | 3.85 | AR 7 in El Dorado | US 167B in El Dorado | 1971 | current | |
| AR 7S | 1.62 | 2.61 | AR 7 in Hot Springs | US 70B in Hot Springs | 2004 | current | Former US 70 |
| AR 7S | 1.40 | 2.25 | AR 7 in Russellville | International Paper factory in Russellville | 1974 | current | |
| AR 8S | 0.20 | 0.32 | AR 8 in Glenwood | Lumber yard in Glenwood | 1987 | current | |
| AR 8S | 0.86 | 1.38 | AR 8 in Hamburg | Ashley CR 73 | 1993 | 2001 | Supplanted by AR 189 |
| AR 9S | 0.47 | 0.76 | AR 9 in Morrilton | End state maintenance in Morrilton Industrial Park | 1986 | current | |
| AR 9S | 0.90 | 1.45 | AR 9 in Melbourne | AR 9 in Melbourne | 1974 | current | |
| AR 10S | 3.07 | 4.94 | AR 10 in Greenwood | US 71 | 1970 | current | Former US 71 |
| AR 11S | 0.90 | 1.45 | AR 11 in Hazen | — | 1953 | 2008 | Supplanted by US 63 Spur |
| AR 11S | 7.19 | 11.57 | AR 11 | US 425 in Star City | 2013 | current | |
| AR 14S | 1.34 | 2.16 | AR 14 at Salado | US 167/AR 230 at Southside | 1978 | current | |
| AR 15S | — | — | AR 15 | Moro Bay State Park | 1992 | 2000 | Supplanted by AR 600 |
| AR 16S | 0.43 | 0.69 | AR 16 in Siloam Springs | US 412/AR 59 in Siloam Springs | — | — | |
| AR 18S | 1.00 | 1.61 | AR 18 | AR 980 in Newport | — | — | |
| AR 18S | 1.21 | 1.95 | AR 18 in Jonesboro | I-555 in Jonesboro | — | — | |
| AR 18S | 5 | 8.0 | AR 18 | AR 18 in Manila | 1948 | 1957 | |
| AR 20S | 1.92 | 3.09 | AR 20 | Mississippi River levee | 1963 | current | Supplanted AR 49S |
| AR 23S | 2.65 | 4.26 | AR 23 at Forum | AR 23 | — | — | Former AR 23W |
| AR 25S | 0.6 | 0.97 | AR 25 in Heber Springs | — | — | — | |
| AR 25S | 0.74 | 1.19 | AR 25 in Charlotte | Weaver Lane in Charlotte | 1961 | current | |
| AR 25S | 3.01 | 4.84 | AR 5/AR 25 in Tumbling Shoals | Old Highway 25 Park in Tumbling Shoals | 1962 | current | |
| AR 26S | 1.29 | 2.08 | AR 26 in Gum Springs | — | 1985 | current | |
| AR 29S | — | — | 6th Street in Lewisville | 2nd Street in Lewisville | — | 1969 | |
| AR 33S | 1.75 | 2.82 | AR 33 in Casscoe | Daisy Lane | 1973 | current | |
| AR 39S | 0.55 | 0.89 | AR 39 | US 49 | 1965 | current | |
| AR 39S | 0.38 | 0.61 | AR 39 | Phillips CR 643 at Postelle | — | — | |
| AR 43S | 1.01 | 1.63 | AR 43 in Siloam Springs | AR 59 in Siloam Springs | 1988 | 1996 | Supplanted AR 68C |
| AR 49S | — | — | AR 20/AR 49 | Mississippi River | 1962 | 1963 | Supplanted by AR 20S |
| AR 58S | — | — | AR 58 in Williford | AR 58E in Williford | 1979 | 1980 | |
| AR 59S | 0.71 | 1.14 | AR 59 in Gentry | AR 59B in Gentry | 1994 | current | Former AR 204 |
| AR 60S | 1.79 | 2.88 | AR 60 in Conway | Donaghey Avenue/Pinnacle Ridge Road in Conway | 1997 | current | |
| AR 69S | 2.53 | 4.07 | AR 69 in Melbourne | Melbourne Municipal Airport in Melbourne | 1990 | current | |
| AR 69S | 0.70 | 1.13 | AR 69 | Jacksonport State Park in Jacksonport | 1985 | current | |
| AR 69S | 0.31 | 0.50 | AR 69 in Batesville | US 167/AR 25 in Batesville | 2004 | current | Supplanted AR 69A |
| AR 69S | 1.54 | 2.48 | AR 69 in Batesville | AR 463 in Batesville | 1970 | current | Supplanted US 63C |
| AR 72S | 1 | 1.6 | AR 72 in Bentonville | US 71B in Bentonville | 1991 | 1999 | |
| AR 75S | 0.860 | 1.384 | AR 75 in Parkin | US 64B/AR 75 in Parkin | 1974 | current | |
| AR 78S | 0.08 | 0.13 | AR 78 in Moro | AR 238 in Moro | 2001 | current | |
| AR 81S | 0.42 | 0.68 | AR 81 | Fairfield Road/Paper Mill Road | 2005 | current | |
| AR 81S | 1.95 | 3.14 | AR 81 in Monticello | University of Arkansas at Monticello in Monticello | 1974 | 1989 | Supplanted by AR 83S |
| AR 83S | 2.36 | 3.80 | AR 83 in Monticello | University of Arkansas at Monticello in Monticello | 1989 | current | Supplanted AR 81S |
| AR 89S | 0.29 | 0.47 | AR 89 in Lonoke | US 70/AR 31 in Lonoke | 1966 | 2014 | Supplanted by AR 89 |
| AR 94S | 0.98 | 1.58 | AR 94 in Rogers | Monte Ne | — | — | |
| AR 95S | 0.32 | 0.51 | AR 95 in Morrilton | — | 1972 | current | |
| AR 106S | 1.62 | 2.61 | AR 106 | Bethesda Lane at Bethesda | 1963 | current | |
| AR 108S | 0.77 | 1.24 | AR 108 at Rocky Comfort | AR 41 | 1973 | current | |
| AR 112S | 1.46 | 2.35 | AR 112 in Fayetteville | I-49/US 71/US 62/AR 16 in Fayetteville | 1971 | current | Former alignment of AR 16 |
| AR 113S | 0.80 | 1.29 | AR 113 in Bigelow | Fourche La Fave River | 1973 | c. 1992 | |
| AR 117S | 1.26 | 2.03 | AR 117 | AR 25 in Powhatan | 1965 | current | |
| AR 127S | 0.25 | 0.40 | AR 127 at Lost Bridge Village | Lost Bridge Public Use Area | 1969 | current | |
| AR 130S | 0.72 | 1.16 | AR 130 in Almyra | 14th Street in Almyra | 1968 | current | |
| AR 133S | 0.53 | 0.85 | AR 133 near Crossett | North Crossett Wastewater Treatment Plant | 1979 | current | |
| AR 136S | 2.0 | 3.2 | — | — | 1963 | 1968 | |
| AR 137S | 2.43 | 3.91 | AR 137 | AR 18 at Armorel | 1996 | 2014 | |
| AR 146S | 1.35 | 2.17 | AR 146 | US 165 in Stuttgart | 1966 | current | Former US 79 |
| AR 150S | 0.45 | 0.72 | AR 150 | US 61 | 1966 | current | Former US 61 |
| AR 163S | 0.40 | 0.64 | AR 163/Crowley's Ridge Parkway in Jonesboro | AR 1 in Jonesboro | 1976 | current | Former AR 1 |
| AR 164S | 0.142 | 0.229 | AR 164 in Clarksville | Industrial area | 1980 | current | Unsigned |
| AR 175S | 3.96 | 6.37 | AR 175 in Cherokee Village | US 62/US 412 in Cherokee Village | 1980 | current | |
| AR 191S | 3.96 | 6.37 | AR 191 in West Memphis | Industrial area | 1970 | 1987 | |
| AR 194S | 1.0 | 1.6 | AR 194 | Horsehead Use Area | 1973 | 1992 | |
| AR 201S | 0.25 | 0.40 | AR 201 in Mountain Home | End state maintenance | 1974 | 2011 | |
| AR 204S | 0.75 | 1.21 | AR 204 in Siloam Springs | End state maintenance | 1974 | 1996 | Renumbered to AR 264 |
| AR 216S | 1.8 | 2.9 | AR 216 | AR 300 | 1966 | — | |
| AR 224S | 1.9 | 3.1 | AR 224 | AR 17 at Erwin | 1965 | 1991 | |
| AR 226S | 1.03 | 1.66 | AR 226 in Jonesboro | AR 349 | 1977 | current | |
| AR 235S | 0.31 | 0.50 | AR 235 at Bruno | End state maintenance | 1976 | current | |
| AR 238S | 0.65 | 1.05 | AR 238 in Brinkley | US 49 in Brinkley | 1962 | current | |
| AR 239S | 1.73 | 2.78 | AR 239 in Blytheville | End state maintenance | 1986 | current | |
| AR 242S | 0.156 | 0.251 | AR 242 in Helena-West Helena | St. Francis National Forest | 1963 | current | |
| AR 243S | 0.54 | 0.87 | AR 243 | Turkey Scratch | 1975 | current | |
| AR 265S | 2.33 | 3.75 | AR 265 in Springdale | US 412 in Springdale | 1988 | 2004 | Part former AR 68N |
| AR 267S | 0.905 | 1.456 | AR 267 | AR 31 | 1970 | current | |
| AR 276S | 1.06 | 1.71 | AR 276 | AR 11 | 1965 | current | |
| AR 280S | 0.462 | 0.744 | AR 280 | Brookings | 1963 | current | |
| AR 282S | 0.97 | 1.56 | AR 282 | End state maintenance | 2010 | current | |
| AR 286S | 1.8 | 2.9 | AR 286 | End state maintenance | c. 1972 | 1997 | Renumbered AR 60S |
| AR 295S | 1.7 | 2.7 | AR 295 | US 412 in Hindsville | 1965 | 2009 | Former AR 68 |
| AR 300S | 1.55 | 2.49 | AR 300 at Little Italy | Ledwidge | 1973 | 1992 | |
| AR 308S | 0.127 | 0.204 | AR 308 in Marked Tree | Marked Tree Municipal Airport in Marked Tree | 1970 | current | |
| AR 321S | 0.35 | 0.56 | AR 321 | AR 31 | 1970 | current | |
| AR 321S | 3.15 | 5.07 | AR 321 | AR 31 | c. 1974 | current | |
| AR 365S | 2.14 | 3.44 | AR 365 in Pine Bluff | I-530/US 270 in White Hall | 1999 | current | |
| AR 367S | 0.49 | 0.79 | AR 367 in Beebe | US 67 in Beebe | 1999 | current | |
| AR 382S | 0.49 | 0.79 | AR 382 in Mountain View | Ozark Folk Center State Park | 1970 | 2003 | |
| AR 384S | 1.418 | 2.282 | AR 384 at Murphy's Corner | Grimes Unit in Newport | 1996 | current | |
Former
