= Arkansas Highway 58 =

State highway in Arkansas, United States

Highway 58

Route information
- Maintained by ArDOT
- Length: 57.37 mi (92.33 km)
- Existed: April 1, 1926–present

Major junctions
- West end: AR 14
- US 167
- East end: US 62 / US 63 / US 412 at Ozark Acres

Location
- Country: United States
- State: Arkansas
- Counties: Stone, Izard, Sharp

Highway system
- Arkansas Highway System; Interstate; US; State; Business; Spurs; Suffixed; Scenic; Heritage
← AR 57	→ US 59

Highway 58 (AR 58, Ark. 58, and Hwy. 58) is an east–west state highway in north central Arkansas. The route of 53.37 miles (85.89 km) begins at Highway 14 and runs east to US Highway 67 (US 67) in Donaldson. There is also an alternate route of 2.71 miles (4.36 km) designated as Highway 58E near Williford. Both routes are maintained by the Arkansas State Highway and Transportation Department (AHTD).

== Route description ==
AR 58 begins at AR 14 and runs north, crossing the White River and Guion. It continues north until meeting AR 69 south of Sage. The route continues east to Maxville, where it meets US 167. AR 58 concurs with US 167 until Cave City, when it begins to head northeast with AR 115. After leaving the AR 115 concurrency, the route heads due north to Poughkeepsie, where it passes the Poughkeepsie School Building and Little Springs Missionary Baptist Church, both listed on the National Register of Historic Places. Highway 58 serves as the eastern terminus for Highway 56. AR 58 continues north to meet AR 354 before heading to Williford. In Williford, AR 58 splits into two routes, with the alternate route being designated AR 58E. The main route continues north to terminate at US 62/US 63/US 412.

== History ==
Highway 58 was created during the 1926 Arkansas state highway numbering as a route between State Road 69 and US 62/US 63 at Williford.

== Major intersections ==
Mile markers reset at concurrencies.

County	Location	mi	km	Destinations	Notes
Stone		0.00	0.00	AR 14 – Locust Grove, Mountain View	Western terminus
Izard		17.57	28.28	AR 69 north / AR 69B north – Sage, Melbourne	West end of AR 69 overlap
Izard		0.00	0.00	AR 69 south – Batesville	East end of AR 69 overlap
Sharp		13.53	21.77	US 167 north – Evening Shade, Ash Flat	West end of US 167 overlap
Sharp	Cave City			US 167 south – Batesville	East end of US 167 overlap; west end of AR 115 overlap
Sharp	Emery	0.00	0.00	AR 115 north – Smithville, Calamine	East end of AR 115 overlap
Sharp	Poughkeepsie	6.29	10.12	AR 56 west	
Sharp		11.15	17.94	AR 354 west – Ash Flat	
Sharp	Williford	21.75	35.00	AR 58E east (Main St) – Williford	
Sharp		23.79	38.29	US 62 / US 63 / US 412 – Hardy, Imboden	Eastern terminus
1.000 mi = 1.609 km; 1.000 km = 0.621 mi: Concurrency terminus

== Alternate route ==
Highway 58E
- Location: Williford
- Length: 2.71 mi (4.36 km)

Highway 58E (AR 58E, Ark. 58E, and Hwy. 58E) is an east–west state highway alternate route in Sharp County. The route of 2.71 miles (4.36 km) begins at Highway 58 and runs east to US 62/US 63/US 412.

Route description

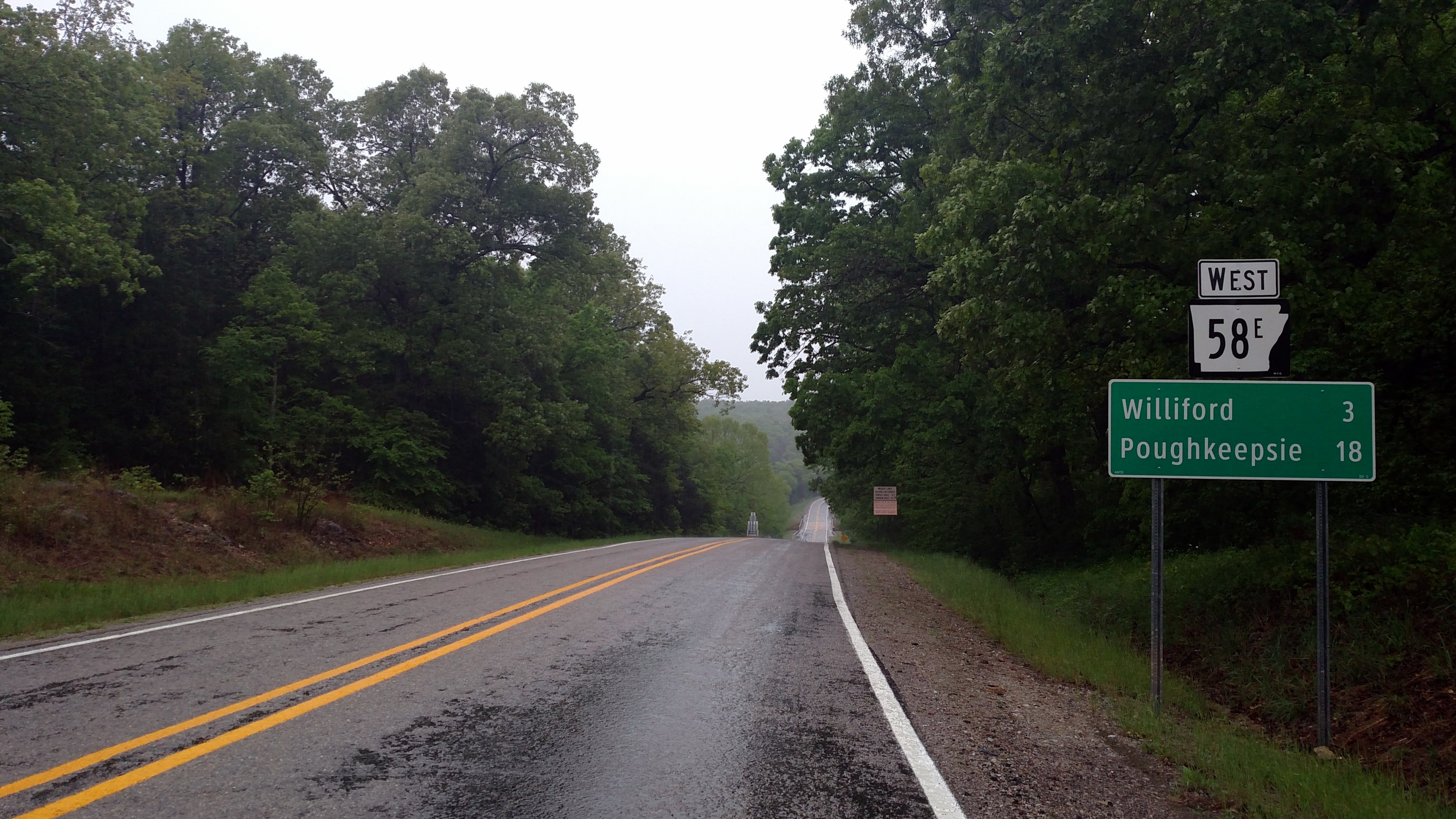
Highway 58E reassurance marker

Highway 58E begins at its parent route in Williford and runs east as Main Street. The route runs roughly parallel to the Spring River before turning north to intersect US 62/US 63/US 412, where it terminates.

History

Highway 58E is a portion of the original 1926 routing of US 62/US 63 through the area.

Major intersections

The entire route is in Sharp County.

Location	mi	km	Destinations	Notes
Williford	0.00	0.00	AR 58 – Poughkeepsie	Western terminus
	2.71	4.36	US 62 / US 63 / US 412 – Hardy, Imboden	Eastern terminus
1.000 mi = 1.609 km; 1.000 km = 0.621 mi

== See also ==
- List of state highways in Arkansas
