= Bryant, Independence County, Arkansas =

Bryant, Arkansas
- Unincorporated community
- Location within Arkansas Location within the United States
- Coordinates: 35°44′30″N 91°39′08″W
- Country: United States
- State: Arkansas
- County: Independence
- Township: McHue
- Elevation: 509 ft (155 m)
- Time zone: UTC-6 (Central (CST))
  - Summer (DST): UTC-5 (CDT)
- Area code: 870
- GNIS feature ID: 57458

Bryant is an unincorporated community in McHue Township, Independence County, Arkansas, United States. It is located on Arkansas Highway 25, south of Batesville.
