= Arkansas Highway 233 =

State highway in Arkansas, United States

Highway 233
- AR 233 highlighted in red

Route information
- Maintained by AHTD
- Length: 11.619 mi (18.699 km)

Major junctions
- South end: US 167 / AR 25 / AR 69 in Batesville
- AR 25 in Batesville; AR 69 in Moorefield; AR 69 in Newark
- North end: W 2nd Street in Newark

Location
- Country: United States
- State: Arkansas
- Counties: Independence

Highway system
- Arkansas Highway System; Interstate; US; State; Business; Spurs; Suffixed; Scenic; Heritage
← AR 232	→ AR 234

Arkansas Highway 233 (AR 233 and Hwy. 233) is a United States state highway of 18.5 miles (29.8 km) consisting of three distinct segments existing in Independence County. It has no business or spur routes.

== Route description ==
AR 233 consists of three distinct, unconnected segments:

1. From US 167/AR 25/AR 69 in Batesville, then northeasterly via Main Street to a second junction with AR 25, continuing northerly a short distance to where AR 394 splits off. AR 233 continues northerly before curving to the west to a terminus at US 167 north of Batesville. (Segment length: 2.580 miles)
2. From AR 25 approximately 2.9 miles east of its first junction with that route, then southerly via Mack Street to a terminus at AR 69 in Moorefield. (Segment length: 1.159 miles)
3. From AR 69B in Sulphur Rock easterly, northeasterly, then southerly into Newark where it terminates at AR 69B at West 6th Street. (Segment length: 7.880 miles)

While two segments of implied route concurrency could theoretically link the distinct portions of AR 233 in to one, contiguous highway route, signage in the field and official Arkansas State Highway and Transportation Department maps prove otherwise.

== Major intersections ==
The entire route is in Independence County.

Location	mi	km	Destinations	Notes
Batesville	0.0	0.0	US 167 / AR 25 / AR 69	Southern terminus
Batesville	1.8	2.9	AR 25 – Cord	
Batesville	1.9	3.1	AR 394 east	Western terminus of AR 394
	2.6	4.2	US 167 – Batesville, Cave City	Northern terminus
1.000 mi = 1.609 km; 1.000 km = 0.621 mi
