= Arkansas Highway 69 =

State highway in Arkansas, United States

Highway 69

Route information
- Maintained by ArDOT
- Existed: 1926–present

Section 1
- Length: 57.64 mi (92.76 km)
- North end: AR 9 in Melbourne
- South end: AR 14 / AR 367 in Newport

Section 2
- Length: 15.31 mi (24.64 km)
- South end: AR 163
- North end: AR 158 at Lunsford

Section 3
- Length: 7.44 mi (11.97 km)
- South end: US 49 / AR 1 in Paragould
- North end: US 412B / AR 135 in Paragould

Location
- Country: United States
- State: Arkansas
- Counties: Izard, Independence, Jackson, Poinsett, Craighead, Greene

Highway system
- Arkansas Highway System; Interstate; US; State; Business; Spurs; Suffixed; Scenic; Heritage
← US 67	→ US 70

Highway 69 (AR 69, Ark. 69, and Hwy. 69) is a designation for three north–south state highways in northeast Arkansas. A western route of 57.64 miles (92.76 km) runs south from Highway 9 at Melbourne to Highway 14/Highway 367 in Newport. (Note: Although Arkansas highways normally run from south to north and from west to east, the Route Log Database indicates that Highway 69 begins at Highway 9 and runs south.) A second route of 15.31 miles (24.64 km) begins at Highway 163 and runs north through Trumann to Highway 158 at Lunsford. A third route begins at U.S. Route 49/Highway 1 (US 49/AR 1) at the city limits of Paragould and runs north to terminate at US 412B in the city.

== Route description ==
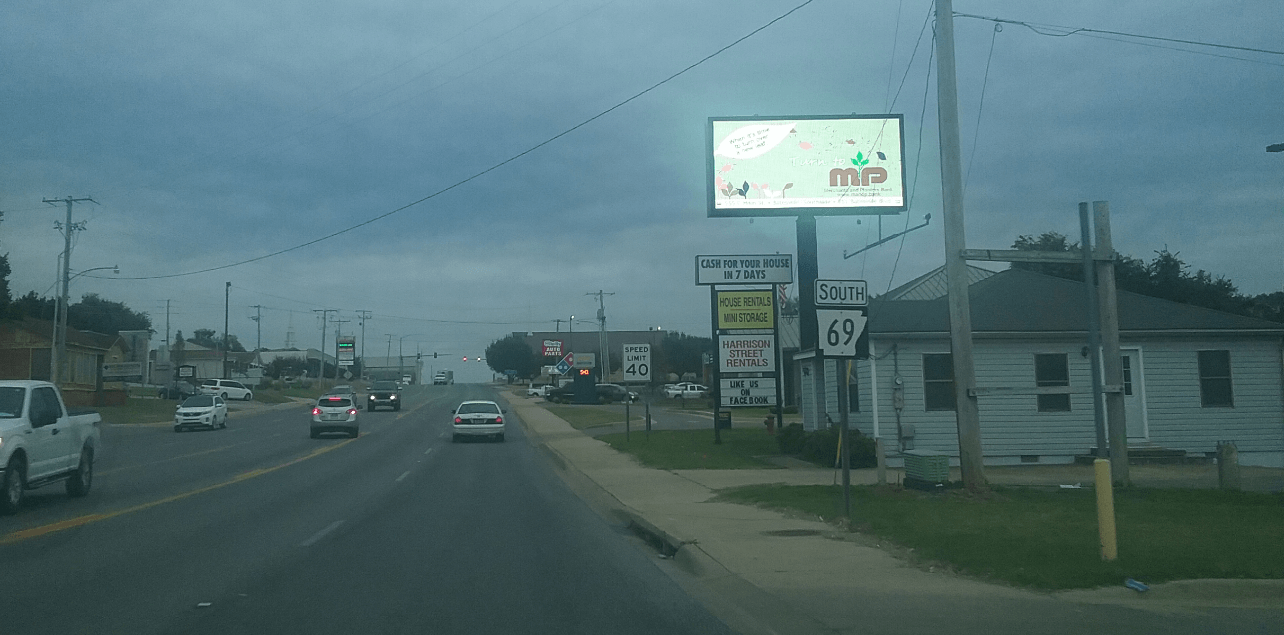
Highway 69 in Batesville, Arkansas.

=== Melbourne to Newport ===
AR 69 begins at AR 367 in Newport and heads north to Jacksonport. A Spur Route 69 develops in Jacksonport. The route leads northwest to AR 122 in Newark and AR 233 in Sulphur Rock. Continuing north, the route passes through Cushman and Mount Pleasant.

=== Shady Grove to Lunsford ===
Arkansas Highway 69 begins in Poinsett County and heads east from AR 163. It crosses Interstate 555 (I-555) as Exit 29 continuing east to Trumann. After detaching a spur route that leads through Trumann, AR 69 leads mostly north and ends at AR 158.

=== Paragould segment ===
AR 69 runs from US 49/AR 1 south of Paragould. The route runs east then north to terminate at US 412B/AR 135 in downtown Paragould.

== Major intersections ==
County	Location	mi	km	Destinations	Notes
Jackson	Newport			AR 14 / AR 367 – Tuckerman, Bradford	Former US 67
Jackson				AR 18 east – Diaz	
Jackson				AR 69S south – Jacksonport State Park	
Independence				AR 122 – Oil Trough, Newark	
Independence				AR 69B south	
Independence				AR 394 west (Gap Road)	
Independence	Sulphur Rock			AR 69B north – Sulphur Rock Business District	
Independence				AR 69B south – Sulphur Rock Business District	
Independence	Moorefield			AR 233 north to AR 25	
Independence	Batesville			AR 394 east (Gap Road)	
Independence	Batesville			US 167 south / AR 25 south (St. Louis Street) / AR 69B north (East Harrison Street)	south end of US 167 / AR 25 overlap
Independence	Batesville			AR 233 north (East Main Street) – Lyon College, Batesville Business District, Historical District	
Independence	Batesville			US 167 north / AR 25 north (St. Louis Street) – Cave City	north end of US 167 / AR 25 overlap
Independence	Batesville			To US 167 north / AR 25 north (via AR 69S south) – Cave City, Charlotte	
Independence	Batesville			AR 69B south – Batesville	
Independence				AR 106 east	
Izard				AR 58 east – Sidney	south end of AR 58 overlap
Izard				AR 58 west – Guion	north end of AR 58 overlap
Izard				AR 69B north – Sage	
Izard	Melbourne			AR 69B south – Sage	
Izard	Melbourne			AR 69S north – Airport, Industrial Park No. 2, North Central Arkansas District Fairgrounds	
Izard	Melbourne			AR 9 – Sylamore, Brockwell, Blanchard Springs Caverns, Ozark Folk Center	
1.000 mi = 1.609 km; 1.000 km = 0.621 mi

County	Location	mi	km	Destinations	Notes
Poinsett				AR 163	
Poinsett	Trumann			I-555 – Jonesboro, Marked Tree	I-555 exit 29
Poinsett	Trumann			AR 198 east (Commerce Drive) / AR 214 east (Industrial Drive)	
Poinsett	Trumann			AR 463 – Jonesboro, Marked Tree	
Poinsett	Trumann			Melton Avenue	former US 63C south
Poinsett	Trumann			AR 69S (North Ozark Avenue)	
Poinsett				Stephens Access St. Francis River	former AR 198 east
Craighead	Lunsford			AR 158 to AR 18 – Bay	
1.000 mi = 1.609 km; 1.000 km = 0.621 mi

The entire route is in Paragould, Greene County.

mi	km	Destinations	Notes
0.00	0.00	US 49 / AR 1 – Jonesboro, Paragould	
5.90	9.50	US 412	
6.30	10.14	AR 358 west	
7.48	12.04	US 412B (East Kingshighway) / AR 135	
1.000 mi = 1.609 km; 1.000 km = 0.621 mi

== Auxiliary routes ==
Highway 69 has three business routes and four spur routes. As cities have grown, bypasses have become necessary, and the former downtown alignments of AR 69 have become the business routes discussed here.

== See also ==
- List of state highways in Arkansas
