= Arkansas Highway 106 =

State highway in Arkansas, United States

Highway 106
- Bethesda Road

Route information
- Maintained by ArDOT
- Length: 12.42 mi (19.99 km)

Major junctions
- West end: AR 69 near Cushman
- East end: AR 69B in Batesville

Location
- Country: United States
- State: Arkansas
- Counties: Independence

Highway system
- Arkansas Highway System; Interstate; US; State; Business; Spurs; Suffixed; Scenic; Heritage
← AR 105	→ AR 107

Highway 106 (AR 106, Ark. 106, and Hwy. 106) is an east–west state highway in Independence County. The highway of 12.42 miles (19.99 km) runs from Highway 69 near Cushman south and east to Highway 69B (AR 69B) in Batesville.

== Route description ==
Highway 106 begins at Highway 69 south of Cushman in western Independence County. The highway runs south past the Batesville Livestock and Forestry Research Station, a branch of the University of Arkansas System Division of Agriculture. Highway 106 continues south where Highway 106 Spur begins, running west to Bethesda. The parent route turns east at this point, passing a quarry and Ruddle Hill before entering the Batesville city limits and terminating at Highway 69B.

== Major intersections ==
The entire route is in Independence County.

Location	mi	km	Destinations	Notes
	0.00	0.00	AR 69	Western terminus
	5.66	9.11	AR 106S (Bethesda Ln)	AR 106S eastern terminus
Batesville	12.42	19.99	AR 69B (Central Ave)	Eastern terminus
1.000 mi = 1.609 km; 1.000 km = 0.621 mi

== Bethesda spur ==
Highway 106S
- Location: Bethesda
- Length: 1.62 mi (2.61 km)

Highway 106 Spur (AR 106S, Ark. 106S, or Hwy. 106S) is a spur route to Bethesda. The highway is 1.62-mile (2.61 km) in length.

=== Route description ===
The route begins at Highway 106 and runs west to Bethesda, a small unincorporated community.

=== Major intersections ===
The entire route is in Independence County.

Location	mi	km	Destinations	Notes
	0.00	0.00	AR 106 (White Drive)	Eastern terminus
Bethesda	1.62	2.61	End state maintenance, roadway continues as Bethesda Ln	Western terminus
1.000 mi = 1.609 km; 1.000 km = 0.621 mi

== See also ==
- List of state highways in Arkansas
