= Izard County Courthouse =

- U.S. National Register of Historic Places

- Location within Arkansas Location within the United States
- Location: AR 69 (Courthouse Square), Melbourne, Arkansas
- Coordinates: 36°3′31″N 91°54′20″W
- Area: less than one acre
- Built: 1938
- Architectural style: Art Deco
- NRHP reference No.: 93001025
- Added to NRHP: September 30, 1993

The Izard County Courthouse is located at Courthouse Square and Arkansas Highway 69 in Melbourne, the county seat of Izard County, Arkansas. It is a two-story structure, built of rusticated gray limestone, with modest Art Deco styling. The grounds include a World War I memorial featuring a marble doughboy statue erected in 1930 in front of the courthouse. It was built in 1938–1940 by crews from the National Youth Administration. It is the county's fourth courthouse, two of the first three having been destroyed by fire.

The building was listed on the National Register of Historic Places in 1993.

== See also ==
- List of county courthouses in Arkansas
- National Register of Historic Places listings in Izard County, Arkansas
