= Arkansas Highway 25 =

State highway in Arkansas, United States

Highway 25

Route information
- Maintained by ArDOT
- Length: 127.36 mi (204.97 km)
- Existed: 1926–present

Major junctions
- South end: US 64 in Conway
- I-40 in Conway; US 65 in Greenbrier; AR 5 from Heber Springs to Wolf Bayou; US 167 in Batesville
- North end: US 63 / US 412 in Black Rock

Location
- Country: United States
- State: Arkansas
- Counties: Faulkner, Cleburne, Independence, Lawrence

Highway system
- Arkansas Highway System; Interstate; US; State; Business; Spurs; Suffixed; Scenic; Heritage
← AR 24	→ AR 26

Arkansas Highway 25 is a north–south state highway in north central Arkansas. The route runs 127.36 miles (204.97 km) from U.S. Route 64 (US 64) in Conway north to US 63/US 412 in Black Rock through Heber Springs, Batesville, and the foothills of The Ozarks.

== Route description ==
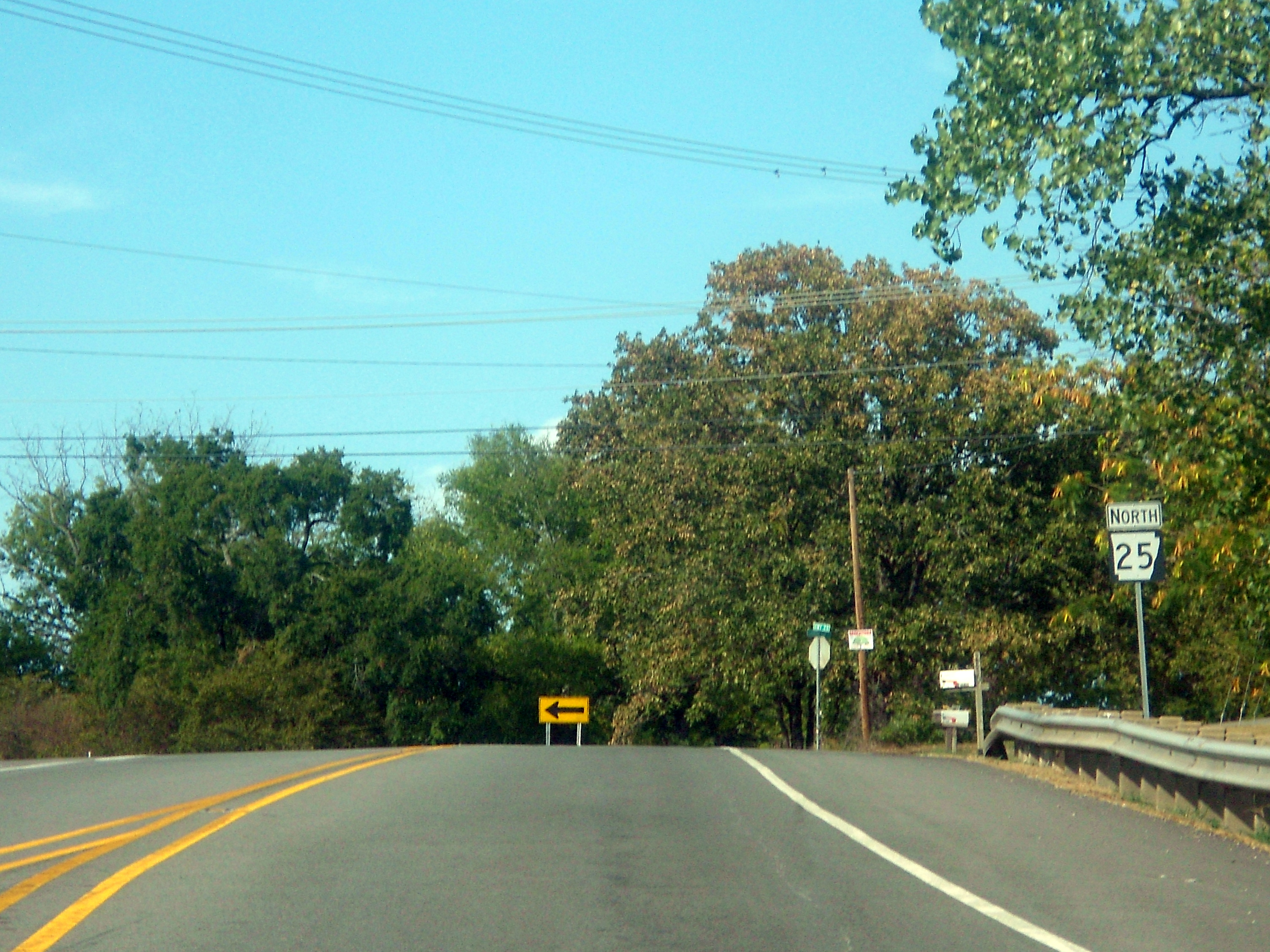
Highway 25 runs north in Conway

Highway 25 begins in Conway at U.S. Route 64 (US 64), just south of a junction with I-40. From Conway, the road runs north to Wooster, where it turns northeast, meeting US 65 in Greenbrier. The route overlaps US 65 for several miles north of Greenbrier, then continues northeast, meeting Highway 107 and Highway 225 before entering Quitman. Highway 25 continues diagonally northeast, meeting Highway 16 and Highway 5 near Heber Springs. A business loop and two spur routes both serve Heber Springs. Highway 25 continues north with Highway 5, a partnership named Heber Springs Road, until Highway 5 departs at Wolf Bayou. Highway 87 joins Highway 25 in nearby Concord.

Entering Independence County, Highway 25 meets Highway 14 in Locust Grove. The route meets US 167 just north of the Batesville Municipal Airport in south Batesville. In central Batesville, Highway 25 (here concurrent with US 167) meets Highway 69 before exiting town headed due east. Highway 122 meets Highway 25 near Cord, after which it begins heading north. Highway 25 runs north until Highway 230 in Strawberry, followed by a meeting and concurrency with Highway 361 from Lynn to Black Rock, where it terminates at US 63/US 412.

Except where it coincides with US 65 in Greenbrier and US 167 in Batesville (both undivided four-lane segments), and certain passing lanes, (mostly between Greenbrier and Heber Springs), it is entirely a two-lane highway. This hilly, curvy road is useful for those seeking the towns and recreational areas along it, mainly in the Greers Ferry Lake area.

== History ==
The segment between Conway and Wooster is a former route of US 65.

Before 1982 it included an east–west highway between US 63 approximately 2 miles (3.2 km) southeast of Portia, Arkansas and the Missouri state line, where it continued into Missouri. In 1982 this road was redesignated as the anomalous US 412. Major towns along the road include Walnut Ridge and Paragould. This section through the cotton country of eastern Arkansas was flat and largely straight, except where it passed through Crowley's Ridge west of Paragould. Its eastern terminus was then the Missouri state line at the St. Francis River, where it continued as Missouri Route 25 toward Kennett, Missouri.

Some sources continue to claim that Highway 25 ends at US 67/Highway 34 at Walnut Ridge. Though this was the original west end of US 412 when established in 1982 from Highway 25 east of Walnut Ridge, it was later extended west across Arkansas along the former Black Rock-Walnut Ridge segment of Highway 25 (including its concurrency with US 63 from Black Rock to Portia), thus truncating Highway 25 at Black Rock where it meets the present US 63/US 412 concurrency.

== Major intersections ==
Mile markers reset at some concurrencies.

County	Location	mi	km	Destinations	Notes
Faulkner	Conway	0.00	0.00	US 64 – Conway, Morrilton	Southern terminus
Faulkner	Conway	0.07	0.11	I-40 – Fort Smith, Little Rock	Exits 124B-A on I-40
Faulkner	Wooster	6.64	10.69	AR 285 north – Shady Grove	Southern terminus of AR 285
Faulkner	Greenbrier	11.33	18.23	US 65 south – Conway	Southern end of US 65 concurrency
Faulkner	Greenbrier			AR 225 (Main Street)	
Faulkner				AR 285 north – Woolly Hollow State Park	Southern terminus of AR 285
Faulkner		0.00	0.00	US 65 north – Harrison, Buffalo National River	Northern end of US 65 concurrency
Faulkner	Quitman	12.47	20.07	AR 107 south – Enola	Northern terminus of AR 107
Cleburne	Quitman	13.98	22.50	AR 124 west to US 65 – Gravesville	Southern end of AR 124 concurrency
Cleburne	Quitman	14.38	23.14	AR 356 west to AR 225 – Greers Ferry, Morganton	Eastern terminus of AR 356
Cleburne	Quitman	14.61	23.51	AR 124 east – Rose Bud	Northern end of AR 124 concurrency
Cleburne		20.35	32.75	AR 107 south to AR 124 – Rose Bud	Southern end of AR 107 concurrency
Cleburne		21.29	34.26	AR 16 west – Higden, Fairfield Bay, Greers Ferry	Southern end of AR 16 concurrency
Cleburne		22.70	36.53	AR 107 north to AR 110 – Eden Isle	Northern end of AR 107 concurrency
Cleburne		25.62	41.23	AR 5 south – Rose Bud	Southern end of AR 5 concurrency
Cleburne		26.46	42.58	AR 16 east – Pangburn, Searcy	Northern end of AR 16 concurrency
Cleburne		27.65	44.50	AR 25B north (Heber Springs Road) – Heber Springs Business District	Southern terminus of AR 25B
Cleburne		29.41	47.33	AR 337 south	Northern terminus of AR 337
Cleburne	Heber Springs	30.74	49.47	AR 110 (Wilburn Road) – Heber Springs Business District, Wilburn, ASU-Heber Springs	
Cleburne		32.60	52.46	AR 25B south (Heber Springs Road) – Heber Springs Business District	Northern terminus of AR 25B
Cleburne		32.89	52.93	Greers Ferry Dam across the Little Red River	
Cleburne	Tumbling Shoals	35.51	57.15	AR 25S west	Eastern terminus of AR 25S
Cleburne	Drasco	43.45	69.93	AR 92 west – Greers Ferry	Eastern terminus of AR 92
Cleburne	Wolf Bayou	45.69	73.53	AR 5 north – Mountain View	Northern end of AR 5 concurrency
Cleburne	Concord	50.80	81.75	AR 87 south	Northern terminus of AR 87
Independence	Locust Grove	59.26	95.37	AR 14 west – Mountain View, Ozark Folk Center, Blanchard Springs Caverns	Southern end of AR 14 concurrency
Independence	Locust Grove	59.62	95.95	AR 230 east	Western terminus of AR 230
Independence	Dennison Heights	66.34	106.76	US 167 south / AR 14 east – Newport, Bald Knob	Northern end of AR 14 concurrency; southern end of US 167 concurrency
Independence	Batesville			AR 69 south / AR 69B north (East Harrison Street) – Business District	Southern end of AR 69 concurrency
Independence	Batesville			AR 233 north (East Main Street) – Lyon College, Batesville Business District, Historical District	Southern terminus of AR 233
Independence	Batesville			AR 69 north (Barnett Drive) – Cushman, Melbourne	Northern end of AR 69 concurrency
Independence	Batesville	0.00	0.00	US 167 north (North St. Louis Street) / AR 69S north (White Drive) – Cave City, Melbourne	Northern end of US 167 concurrency
Independence	Batesville	0.87	1.40	AR 233 – Cave City, Batesville	
Independence		3.81	6.13	AR 233 south (Mack Street) – Moorefield	Northern terminus of AR 233
Independence		12.78	20.57	AR 25S south – Charlotte	Northern terminus of AR 25S
Independence		18.56	29.87	AR 122 west – Cord	Eastern terminus of AR 122
Lawrence	Saffell	27.70	44.58	AR 361 north	Southern terminus of AR 361
Lawrence	Strawberry	31.58	50.82	AR 117 north / AR 230 west – Jesup, Cave City	Southern terminus of AR 117
Lawrence	Lynn	36.38	58.55	AR 361 south – Saffell, Shirey Bay Rainey Brake WMA	Northern terminus of AR 361
Lawrence		43.81	70.51	Lake Charles State Park	Access via AR 600
Lawrence	Powhatan	47.36	76.22	AR 117S north – Smithville	Southern terminus of AR 117S
Lawrence	Black Rock	49.51	79.68	AR 117 south – Black Rock, Davidsonville Historic State Park	Northern terminus of AR 117
Lawrence	Black Rock	49.69	79.97	US 63 / US 412 – Hoxie, Imboden	Northern terminus
1.000 mi = 1.609 km; 1.000 km = 0.621 mi: Concurrency terminus
