= Spring Mill (Batesville, Arkansas) =

- U.S. National Register of Historic Places
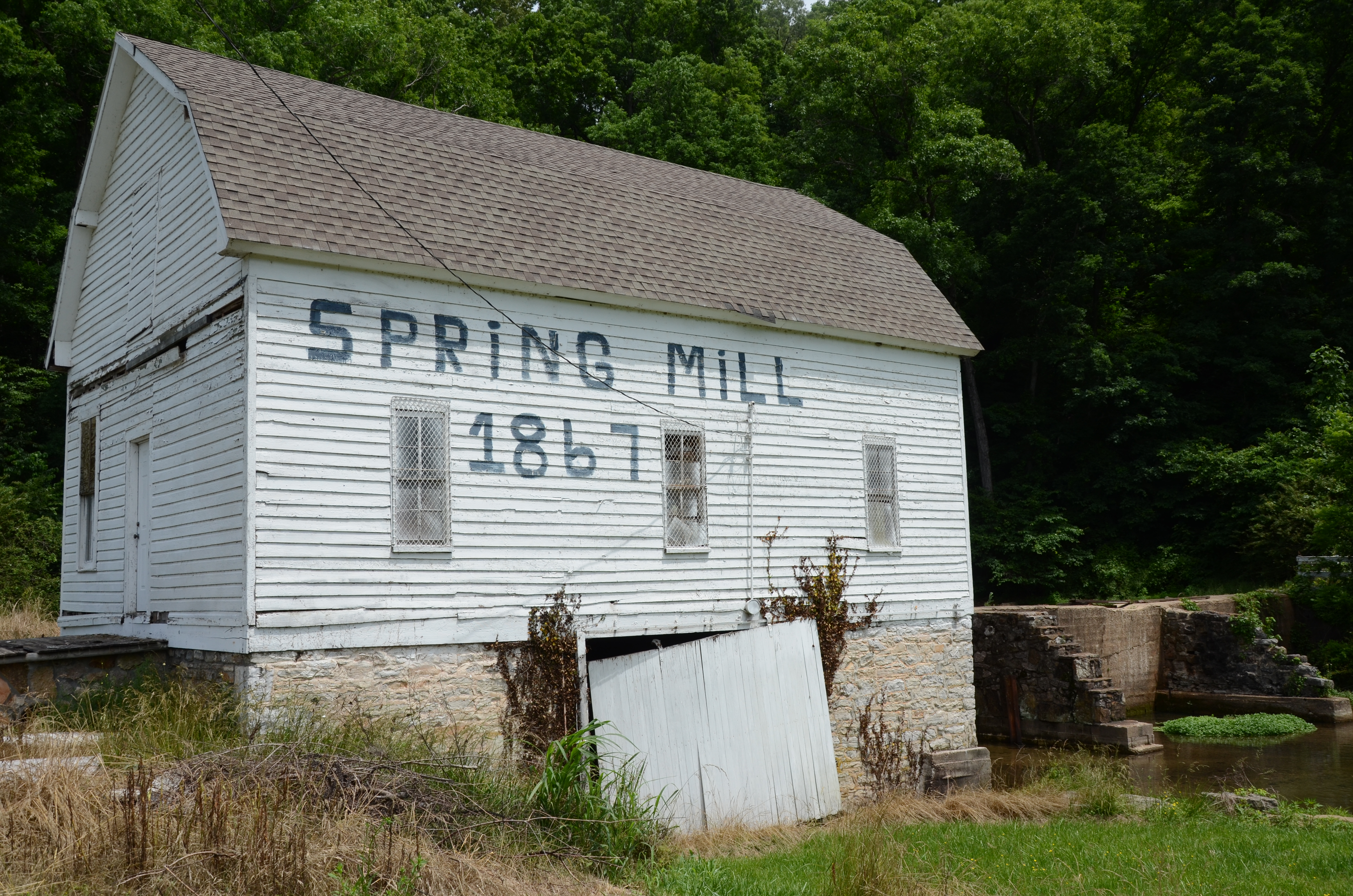

- Location within Arkansas Location within the United States
- Nearest city: Batesville, Arkansas
- Area: less than one acre
- Built: 1869
- Built by: Schnabel, Col. J.A.
- NRHP reference No.: 74000477
- Added to NRHP: March 1, 1974

The Spring Mill is an historic industrial property on Arkansas Highway 69, 6 miles (9.7 km) northwest of Batesville, Arkansas. It is a wood-frame structure with a gambrel roof and clapboard siding, set in a stone foundation at the eastern end of its mill pond, with a concrete-reinforced stone dam extending further to the north. The dam was built in 1867, by Colonel J. A. Schnabel, replacing an earlier log dam, and the building was built about 1869. It is the only known operable grist mill from the period in the state. A.N. Simmons had the Colonel build the Mill. Mr. Jordan James bought the Mill from Simmons in 1873. It then passed through the McCrory Family, Roland Headstream Family, and Coop Family. The John Anderson Lytle Sr. family purchased the Mill in 1917, then passed it to his son John A. Jr, and daughters Edna Grace Lytle Watts, and Helen Gertrude Lytle Bell, in 1934. John & his wife, Ora Ophelia Stewart Lytle made it an operable community landmark for decades, along with their 7 living children. Cold spring water was hauled to neighbors, as well as folks would bring corn to grind into flour and meal. The store also sold various items as well as fish food to feed the plentiful, large rainbow trout in the Mill Pond. The Mill remained in the Lytle family until 2018 when it was sold to the current owners.

The property was listed on the National Register of Historic Places in 1974.

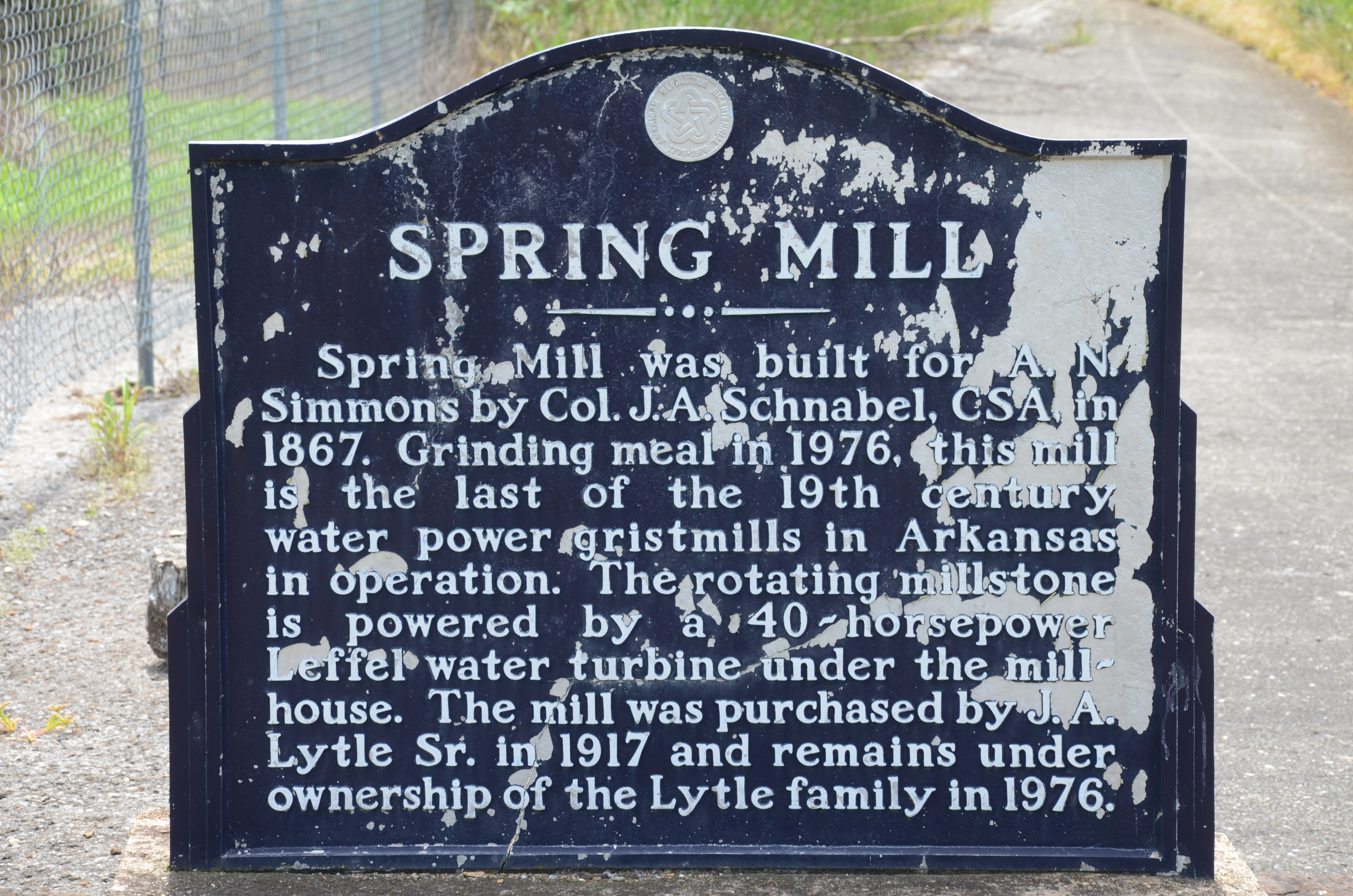
The plaque describing the Mill's history and significance.

== See also ==
- National Register of Historic Places listings in Independence County, Arkansas
