= Little Springs Missionary Baptist Church =

Historic church in Arkansas, United States

- U.S. National Register of Historic Places
- Location within Arkansas Location within the United States
- Location: 4040 AR 58, Poughkeepsie, Arkansas
- Coordinates: 36°4′32″N 91°28′33″W
- Area: less than one acre
- Built: 1946
- Built by: Denton, Ancel
- Architectural style: Vernacular
- NRHP reference No.: 16000321
- Added to NRHP: June 7, 2016

The Little Springs Missionary Baptist Church is a historic church at 4040 Arkansas Highway 58 in Poughkeepsie, Arkansas. Built in 1946, it is built using a distinctive construction method of wood framing finished in stone in a style known as "giraffe rock", in which the exterior is clad in mortared sandstone slabs. The main portion of the church is two stories in height and covered by a gable roof, with a gabled entrance vestibule at the center of the front facade.

The building was listed on the National Register of Historic Places in 2016.

== See also ==
- National Register of Historic Places listings in Sharp County, Arkansas
