= Tommy E. Mitchum =

American politician (1949–2025)

Member of the Arkansas House of Representatives
- In office 1973–1992

Personal details
- Born: Thomas Edward Mitchum; July 17, 1949 Batesville, Arkansas, U.S.
- Died: December 22, 2025 (aged 76) Batesville, Arkansas, U.S.
- Party: Democratic

Thomas Edward Mitchum (July 17, 1949 – December 22, 2025) was an American politician. who served as a member of the Arkansas House of Representatives from 1973 to 1992. A member of the Democratic Party, he represented districts in northern Arkansas and was known for his advocacy on public safety and law enforcement issues.

== Early life and education ==
Mitchum was born on July 17, 1949, in Batesville, Arkansas. He graduated from Southside High School in Batesville in 1967.

== Political career ==
Mitchum was elected to the Arkansas House of Representatives in 1972 at the age of 23, becoming one of the youngest members to serve in the chamber. He took office in 1973 and served continuously until 1992.

During his legislative tenure, Mitchum was associated with public safety initiatives and legislation related to law enforcement. According to contemporaneous reporting, he supported measures strengthening enforcement of drunk driving laws and worked closely with law enforcement organizations in Arkansas. He also served as a spokesperson for the Arkansas State Police Association during his time in public office.

After leaving the legislature, Mitchum worked in public service roles, including serving as a Civil Enforcement Liaison for the Arkansas Department of Human Services under Governor Asa Hutchinson.

== Personal life ==
Mitchum was active in his local community in Batesville and was known for his interest in animal welfare. Obituary notices noted his fondness for his dogs, Buddy, Jasper, and Sebastian.

== Death ==
Mitchum died on December 22, 2025, at White River Medical Center in Batesville, Arkansas, at the age of 76. Funeral arrangements were announced by family members and local funeral services.
