= Bethesda, Arkansas =

- Census-designated place
- Bethesda's position in Arkansas Bethesda (the United States)
- Coordinates: 35°47′21″N 91°47′57″W
- Country: United States
- State: Arkansas
- County: Independence
- Township: Washington
- Elevation: 551 ft (168 m)

Population (2020)
  - Total: 199
- Time zone: UTC-6 (Central (CST))
  - Summer (DST): UTC-5 (CDT)
- Area code: 870
- GNIS feature ID: 2805623

Bethesda was an unincorporated community and census-designated place (CDP) in western Independence County, Arkansas, United States. It was first listed as a CDP in the 2020 census with a population of 199.

It is connected to the Arkansas Highway System via Highway 106S and is approximately eight miles west of Batesville.

== Demographics ==
Historical population
Census	Pop.	Note	%±
2020	199		—
U.S. Decennial Census; 2020

=== 2020 census ===
Bethesda CDP, Arkansas – Demographic Profile (NH = Non-Hispanic) Note: the US Census treats Hispanic/Latino as an ethnic category. This table excludes Latinos from the racial categories and assigns them to a separate category. Hispanics/Latinos may be of any race.
Race / Ethnicity	Pop 2020	% 2020
White alone (NH)	176	88.44%
Black or African American alone (NH)	0	0.00%
Native American or Alaska Native alone (NH)	0	0.00%
Asian alone (NH)	1	0.50%
Pacific Islander alone (NH)	0	0.00%
Some Other Race alone (NH)	0	0.00%
Mixed Race/Multi-Racial (NH)	15	7.54%
Hispanic or Latino (any race)	7	3.52%
Total	199	100.00%

== Education ==
It is in the Batesville School District.
