= Monroe L. Flinn =

American politician

Monroe Lawrence Flinn (December 17, 1917 – November 29, 2005) was an American politician.

Born in Batesville, Arkansas, Flinn moved with his family to Cahokia, Illinois in 1956. He worked for the Granite City Steel Company as a consultant. He was a member of the St. Clair County Board. Flinn served in the Illinois House of Representatives from 1971 to 1995 and was a Democrat. Flinn then served as chair of the Illinois Merit Commission until his death. Flinn died in Cahokia, Illinois.
