= Sage, Arkansas =

- Unincorporated community
- Entering Sage on AR 69B

- Location within Arkansas Location within the United States
- Coordinates: 36°02′45″N 91°48′59″W
- Country: United States
- State: Arkansas
- County: Izard
- Elevation: 679 ft (207 m)
- Time zone: UTC-6 (Central (CST))
  - Summer (DST): UTC-5 (CDT)
- ZIP code: 72573
- Area code: 870
- GNIS feature ID: 58567

Sage is an unincorporated community in Izard County, Arkansas, United States. Sage is 5 miles (8.0 km) east-southeast of Melbourne. Sage has a post office with ZIP code 72573.

A strong EF2 tornado struck the town on March 6, 2022, causing major damage to several structures and injuring six people.

== Education ==
Public education for elementary and secondary students is provided by the Melbourne School District, which leads students to graduate from Melbourne High School.

== Highway ==
- Arkansas Highway 69 Business
