= Central Avenue Bridge (Batesville, Arkansas) =

- U.S. National Register of Historic Places
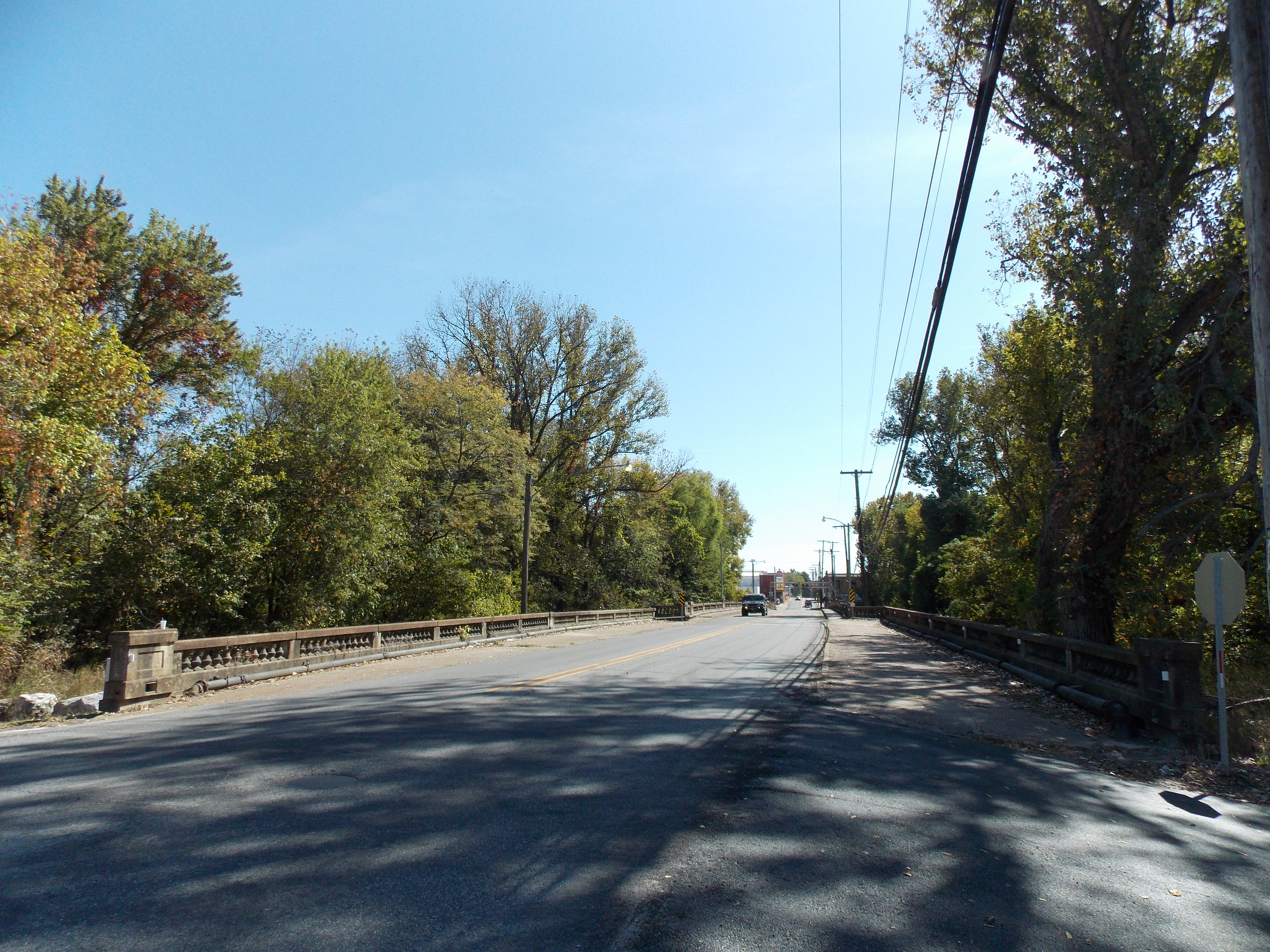

- Location within Arkansas Location within the United States
- Location: Central Avenue over Polk Bayou, Batesville, Arkansas
- Coordinates: 35.77119°N 91.65529°W
- Area: less than one acre
- Built: 1930
- Built by: Luten Bridge Co.
- Architectural style: Deck Arch/Open Spandrel
- MPS: Historic Bridges of Arkansas MPS
- NRHP reference No.: 09001248
- Added to NRHP: January 21, 2010

The Central Avenue Bridge is a historic bridge in Batesville, Arkansas. It carries AR 69B and Central Avenue across Poke Bayou on the city's west side. It is an open spandrel concrete structure, with five spans having a total length of 397 feet (121 m). The longest single span is 80 feet (24 m). The bridge was built in 1930 by the Luten Bridge Company, and features that company's signature rings in the spandrels, which provide additional strength with a minimal use of additional material.

The bridge was listed on the National Register of Historic Places in 2010.

== See also ==
- National Register of Historic Places listings in Independence County, Arkansas
- List of bridges on the National Register of Historic Places in Arkansas
