= Luster Urban Farmstead =

Historic house in Arkansas, United States

- U.S. National Register of Historic Places
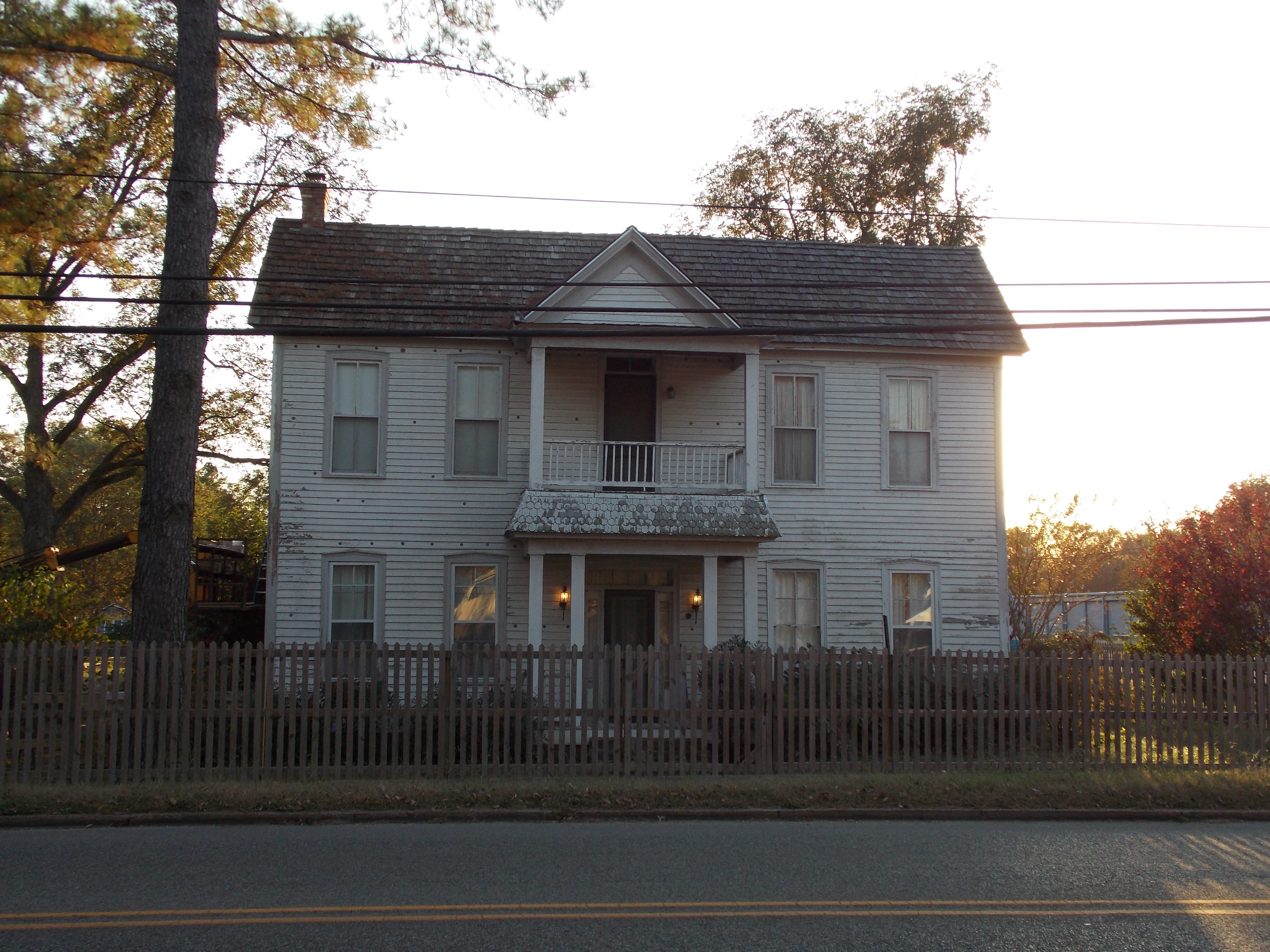

- Location within Arkansas Location within the United States
- Location: 487 N. Central Ave., Batesville, Arkansas
- Coordinates: 35.7727495°N 91.6568676°W
- Area: 1 acre (0.40 ha)
- Built: 1885
- Architectural style: I House
- NRHP reference No.: 83001158
- Added to NRHP: September 16, 1983

The Luster Urban Farmstead is a historic house at 487 North Central Avenue in Batesville, Arkansas. It is a two-story wood-frame I-house with a rear single-story ell. The main facade is five bays wide, with a central two-story porch. Fishscale shingles provide a decorative element on parts of its walls, and windows have molded hoods. The house was built in 1885 by James Luster, and the property includes a smokehouse, barn, and other outbuildings. It is the only known surviving example of an urban farmstead in Batesville (out of at least 20 that were known).

The house was listed on the National Register of Historic Places in 1983.

== See also ==
- National Register of Historic Places listings in Independence County, Arkansas
