= Adler House =

Historic house in Arkansas, United States

- U.S. National Register of Historic Places
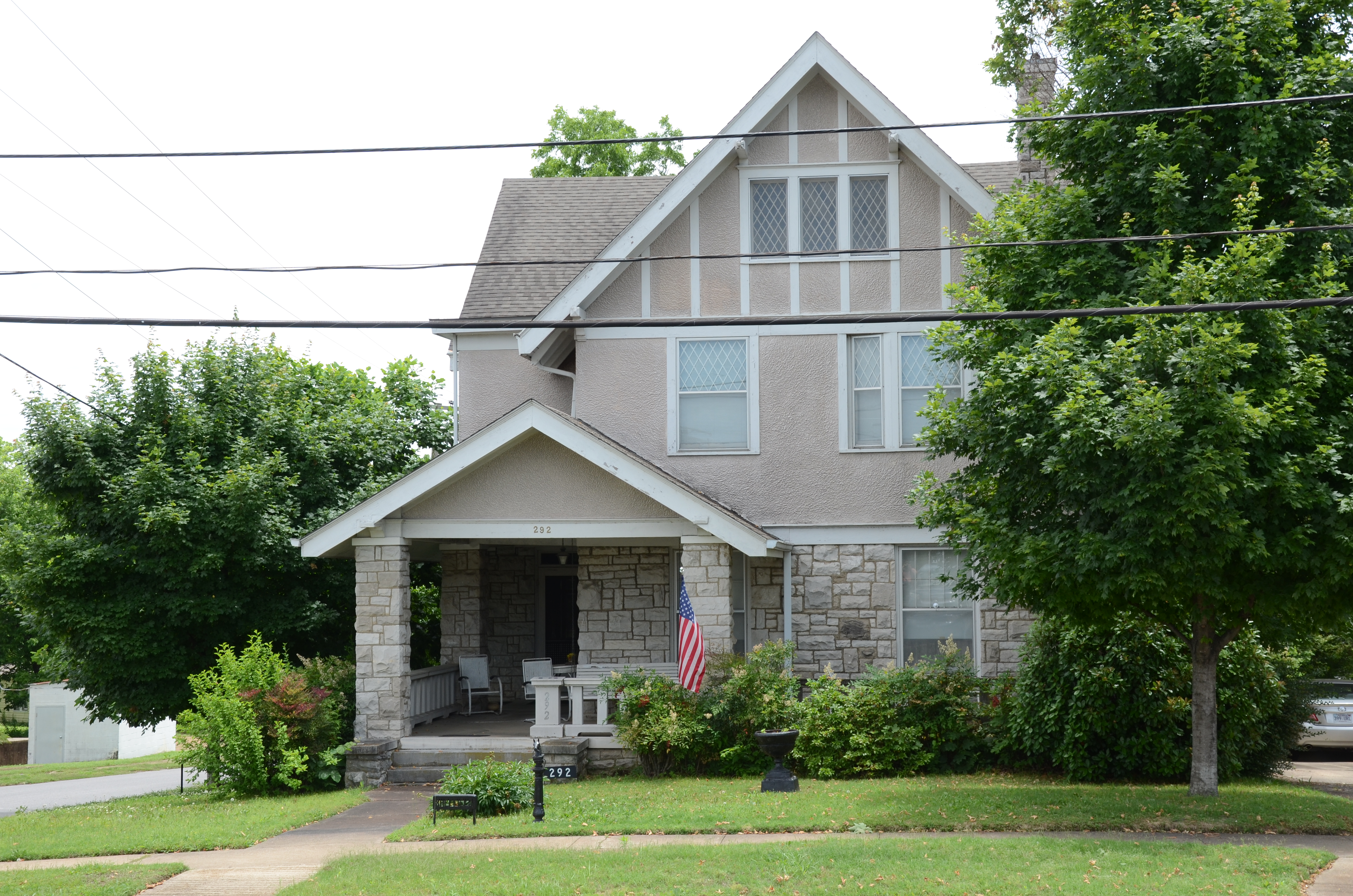

- Location within Arkansas Location within the United States
- Location: 292 Boswell Street, Batesville, Arkansas
- Coordinates: 35°46′9″N 91°39′2″W
- Area: less than one acre
- Built: 1915
- Architect: Theodore Sanders
- Architectural style: Bungalow/Craftsman
- MPS: Thompson, Charles L., Design Collection TR
- NRHP reference No.: 82000833
- Added to NRHP: December 22, 1982

The Adler House is a historic house located at 292 Boswell Street in Batesville, Arkansas.

== Description and history ==
It is a 2 1/2-story structure, built out of coursed rubble limestone, material also used in the chimney and porch piers. It has a cross-gable roof configuration, with the front gable decorated with applied half-timbering over stucco. Below and left of the gable is the entry porch, also with a gabled roof. The house was designed by Theodore Sanders and built c. 1915. It is a high quality local example of Craftsman architecture.

The house was listed on the National Register of Historic Places on December 22, 1982.

== See also ==
- National Register of Historic Places listings in Independence County, Arkansas
