= Melbourne Municipal Airport =

Airport in Arkansas, United States

Melbourne Municipal Airport John E. Miller Field
- IATA: none; ICAO: none; FAA LID: 42A

Summary
- Airport type: Public
- Owner: City of Melbourne
- Serves: Melbourne, Arkansas
- Elevation AMSL: 735 ft (224 m)
- Coordinates: 36°04′16″N 091°49′48″W

Map
- Location of airport in Arkansas 42A (the United States)

Runways
Direction	Length		Surface
Direction	ft	m	Surface
3/21	4,002	1,220	Asphalt

Statistics (2011)
- Aircraft operations: 7,520
- Based aircraft: 11
- Source: Federal Aviation Administration

Melbourne Municipal Airport (FAA LID: 42A), also known as John E. Miller Field, is a city-owned, public-use airport located three nautical miles (6 km) east of the central business district of Melbourne, a city in Izard County, Arkansas, United States. It is included in the National Plan of Integrated Airport Systems for 2011–2015, which categorized it as a general aviation facility.

== Facilities and aircraft ==
Melbourne Municipal - John E. Miller Field covers an area of 130 acres (53 ha) at an elevation of 735 feet (224 m) above mean sea level. It has one runway designated 3/21 with an asphalt surface measuring 4,002 by 75 feet (1,220 x 23 m).

For the 12-month period ending July 31, 2011, the airport had 7,520 aircraft operations, an average of 20 per day: 99.7% general aviation and 0.3% military. At that time there were 11 aircraft based at this airport: 91% single-engine and 9% multi-engine.

== See also ==
- List of airports in Arkansas
