= Batesville Commercial Historic District =

Historic district in Arkansas, United States

- U.S. National Register of Historic Places
- U.S. Historic district
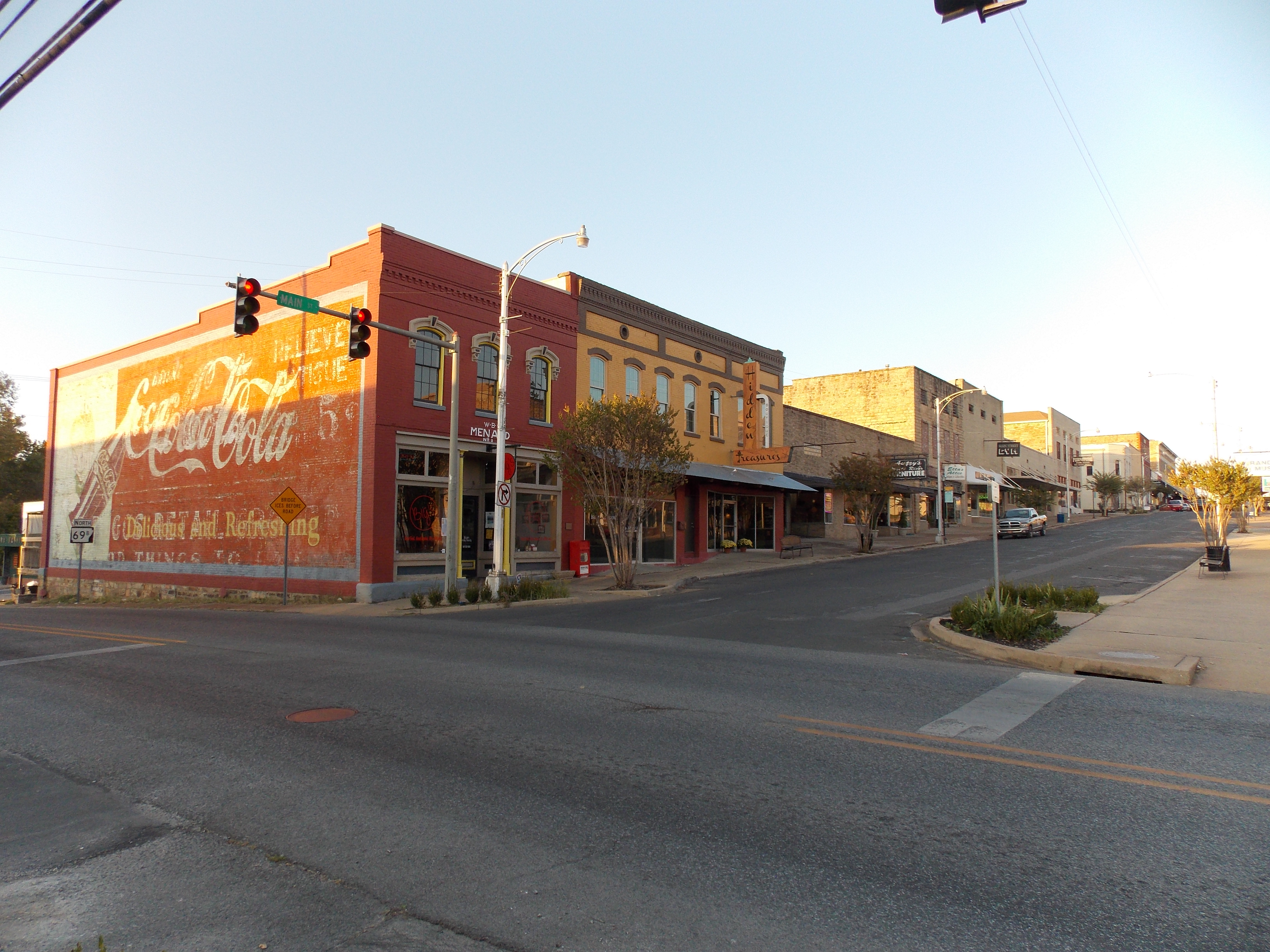

- Location within Arkansas Location within the United States
- Location: Main St. from N of Central to 1 block N of Church, Batesville, Arkansas
- Coordinates: 35°46′12″N 91°39′15″W
- Area: 4 acres (1.6 ha) (original); 5 acres (2.0 ha) (size of increase)
- Architectural style: Renaissance, Art Deco, Italianate
- NRHP reference No.: 82000834 (original); 90001097 (increase 1); 100003328 (increase 2)

Significant dates
- Added to NRHP: October 7, 1982
- Boundary increases: October 5, 1990; January 24, 2019

The Batesville Commercial Historic District encompasses about four city blocks of the historic downtown of Batesville, Arkansas. This area's current appearance is largely the result of development between about 1880 and the 1940s, although it includes a portion of Arkansas' oldest platted Main Street, dating to 1821. When originally listed on the National Register of Historic Places in 1982, the district included 25 historic properties on two blocks of Main Street, on either side of Central Avenue, as well as a few properties on Central. In 1990 the size of the district was more than doubled, adding two more city blocks on Main Street and 36 buildings. Most of the buildings are brick and masonry commercial structures, two stories in height, with party walls joining them at the sides.

== See also ==
- National Register of Historic Places listings in Independence County, Arkansas
