= List of suffixed Arkansas state highways =

- Highway markers for AR 7T, AR 14A, and AR 304N

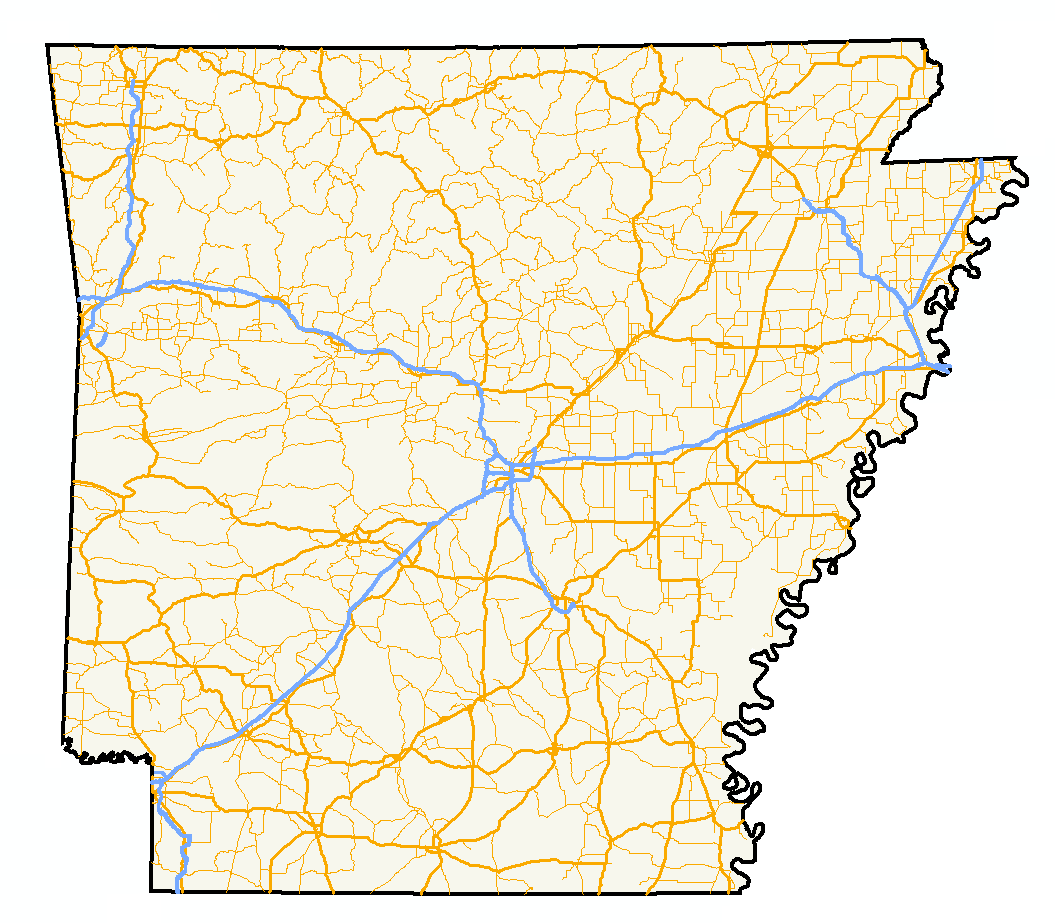
- A map of highways in the state of Arkansas

System information
- Formed: 1926
- State: Arkansas nnA, Highway nnA (AR nnA, Hwy. nnA)

System links
- Arkansas Highway System; Interstate; US; State; Business; Spurs; Suffixed; Scenic; Heritage

This is a list of suffixed state highways in the U.S. state of Arkansas. The spurs are named after their parent highways, which leads to multiple designations of the same name in some cases. All highways are maintained by the Arkansas Department of Transportation (ARDOT).

== Shields ==
Arkansas suffixed shields are mostly the same as their parent highways, with merely the addition of a letter, such as "A" for an alternate route or "T" for a truck route. The major change comes from two-digit routes being printed on 24-by-36-inch (61 cm × 91 cm) while the parent routes are on the square 24-by-24-inch (61 cm × 61 cm) shields.

Arkansas state highway suffixed routes are signed using standard state highway shield backgrounds. The number remains the same size and a letter is added in an almost-exponential format. Shield sizes remain, one-digit routes keep the 24-by-24-inch (61 cm × 61 cm) shields, while two-digit routes become 24-by-36-inch (61 cm × 91 cm). Three-digit routes are the same as the parent route with the letter placed in the available corner space. Banners such as "alternate" are usually not used by the ARDOT, which instead prefers to use only a direction banner.

== Suffixed state highways ==
Number	Length (mi)	Length (km)	Southern or western terminus	Northern or eastern terminus	Formed	Removed	Notes
AR 1E	—	—	—	—	1941	1954	
AR 1W	—	—	—	—	1941	1954	
AR 1Y	0.4	0.64	AR 1 in Paragould	AR 25 in Paragould	1968	1979	Renumbered AR 25Y
AR 7T	2.79	4.49	AR 7 in Russellville	US 64 in Russellville	1962	current	
AR 14A	3.68	5.92	AR 14 at Salado	US 167/AR 25 at Ramsey Hill	1965	1978	
AR 21E	11	18	US 62 in Green Forest	AR 21W in Oak Grove	1950	1955	Former AR 103, renumbered AR 103
AR 21W	—	—	—	—	1950	1956	
AR 22T	5	8.0	AR 22 in Barling	US 71	1954	c. 1971	
AR 23W	2.65	4.26	AR 23	AR 23 at Forum	1966	current	
AR 25Y	0.4	0.64	AR 1 in Paragould	AR 25 in Paragould	1979	1981	Renumbered US 49Y
AR 27N	—	—	AR 27 at Ben Lomond	US 71	1953	1999	
AR 51Y	0.2	0.32	US Route 67	AR 51	—	—	
AR 58E	2.71	4.36	AR 58 in Wiliford	US 62/US 63/US 412	1953	current	
AR 68N	—	—	AR 68	US 71 in Springdale	1947	1988	Supplanted by AR 265S
AR 119Y	0.502	0.808	AR 119 in Osceola	AR 158 in Osceola	c. 1966	current	Former AR 119
AR 130A	1.25	2.01	AR 130	AR 152	1973	2004	Never built
AR 133T	1.46	2.35	AR 133 in Crossett	US 82 in Crossett	—	—	
AR 152A	—	—	—	—	—	1964	
AR 152A	—	—	—	—	1965	1981	
AR 176Y	0.4	0.64	I-57 / US 67 / US 167 in Sherwood	AR 176 in Sherwood	—	—	
AR 355Y	0.1	0.16	AR 355	Bois D'Arc Lake	1967	2021	
Former
