= Jacksonport State Park =

State park in Arkansas, United States

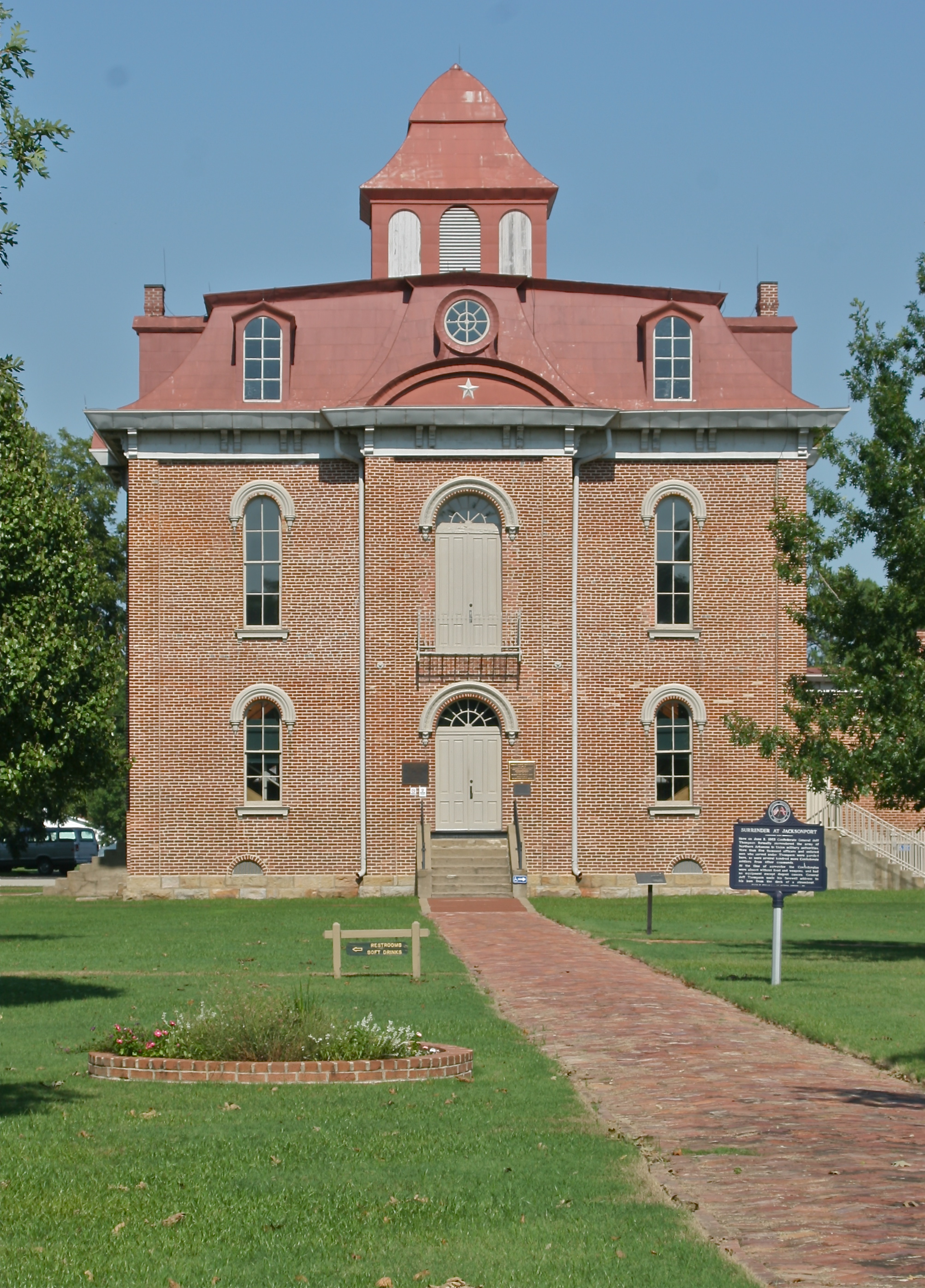
- Historic Jacksonport courthouse
- Interactive map of Jacksonport State Park
- Location: Jackson County, Arkansas, United States
- Coordinates: 35°38′22″N 91°18′41″W
- Area: 164.7 acres (66.7 ha)
- Elevation: 226 ft (69 m)
- Established: 1965
- Administrator: Arkansas Department of Parks, Heritage and Tourism
- Website: Official website
- Jacksonport State Park
- U.S. National Register of Historic Places
- U.S. Historic district
- Location: Between Dillard St. and the White River
- Area: 4 acres (1.6 ha)
- NRHP reference No.: 70000121
- Added to NRHP: January 21, 1970

Jacksonport State Park is a 164.7-acre (66.7 ha) Arkansas state park in Jackson County, Arkansas in the United States. The park contains the 1872 Jacksonport courthouse which served as the home of county government from 1872-1892. Furnished with regional items of historical significance, tours of the courthouse are available. Jacksonport served as an important steamboat stop and trading center at the confluence of the White River and Black River, until being bypassed by the Iron Mountain and Southern Railroad shortly after becoming the county seat.

== History ==
The community of Jacksonport grew as a major commercial center in the mid-19th century. The town was militarily important during the American Civil War, and was where General M. Jeff Thompson formally surrendered the Confederate Army of Northern Arkansas to Union forces in 1865. In the 1870s the town was bypassed by the railroad, and rapidly declined thereafter as river freight shipment declined. The county seat was moved to Newport in 1891.

The formation of a park began when the Jackson County Historical Society purchased the derelict courthouse for restoration in 1961. The area became a state park on June 5, 1965, and was added to the National Register of Historic Places (NRHP) on January 21, 1970. The park also contains the Jackson Guards Memorial, added to the NRHP in 1996. In 1967, the Mary Woods No. 2, a 1930s sternwheeler steamboat was donated to the park. It opened as a museum in May 1976.

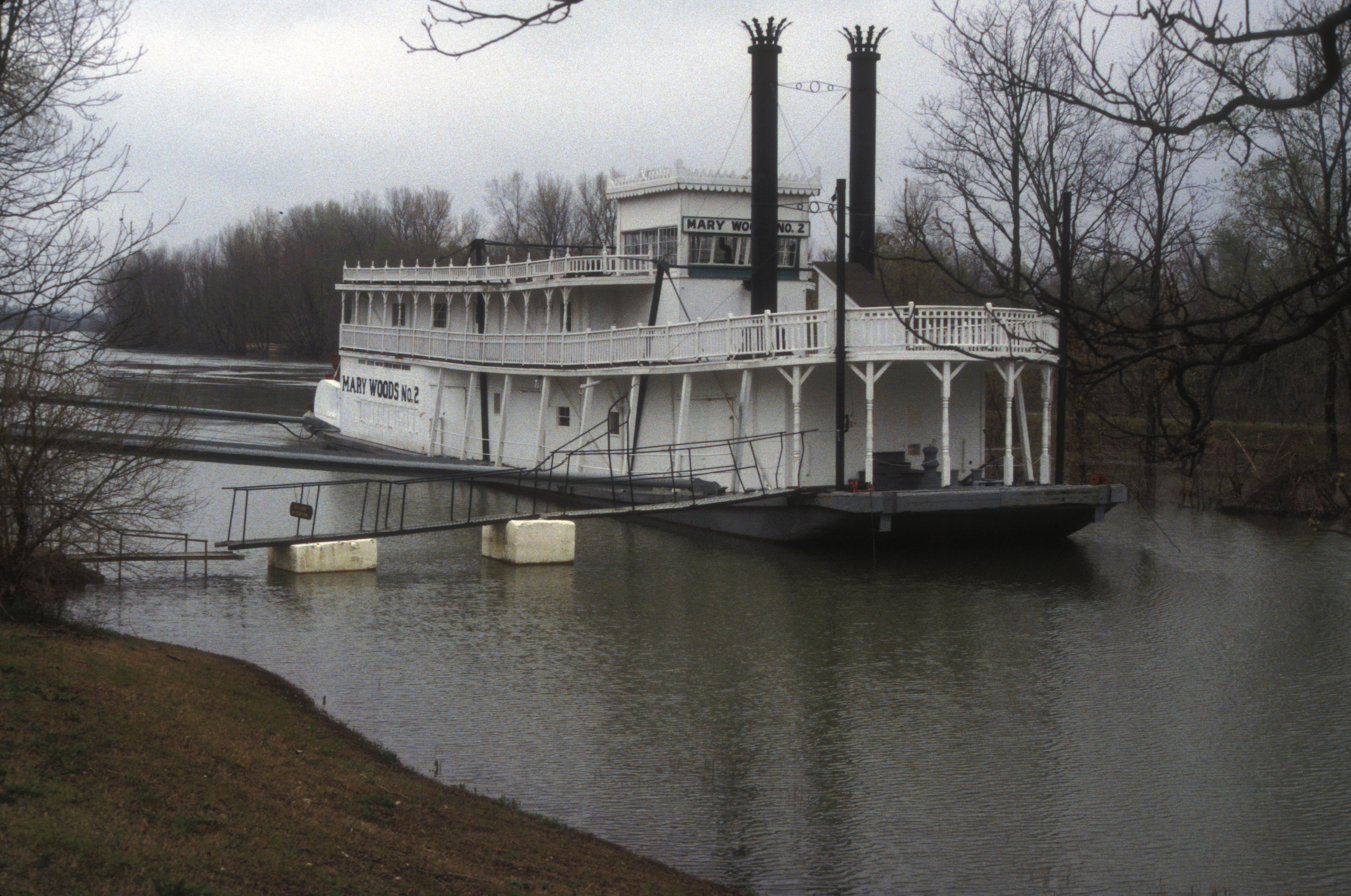
Mary Woods II

A pipe on the sternwheeler froze and rethawed, causing it to sink in January 1984, after which it was raised and restored. Then, on March 1, 1997, the state park, including the Mary Woods No. 2, suffered severe damage from an F4 tornado. The Mary Woods No. 2 was restored in 2000 and reopened to the public at a cost of $870,000. This restoration "brought the steamboat as close to her actual operating appearance as possible," including shelves stocked with canned goods and tables set for dinner.

However, on January 31, 2010, the sterwheeler again sank at her moorings amidst light snow cover. Police investigators fingered two men who had visited the site of the museum ship that night and had left footprints in the snow. The county prosecutor charged the men with sinking the ship and their bond was set at $500,000. In June 2000, the men were cleared of charges relating to the sinking of the Mary Woods No. 2 and released from jail because divers had discovered evidence that a rusty pipe and a hull leak had likely caused the sinking. The Arkansas Parks and Tourism Department decided that rebuilding the steamboat was not economically feasible.

== Recreation ==
Jacksonport State Park offers 20 campsites (class A), playground, pavilion, swimming beach along the White River and the Tunstall Riverwalk Trail.
