= Batesville, Arkansas =

- City
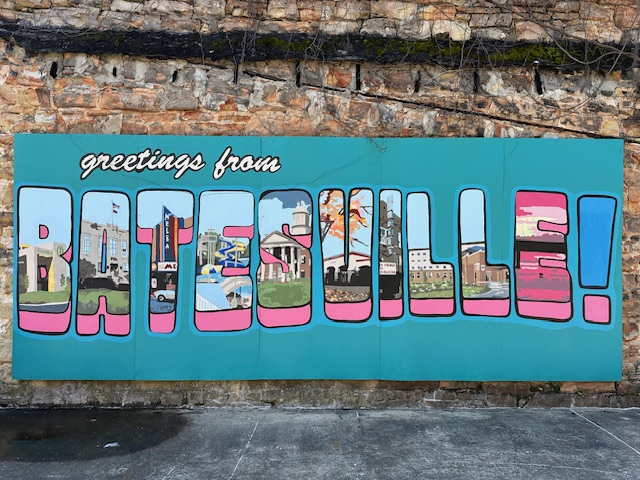
- Welcome mural, February 2025

- Flag

- Location of Batesville in Independence County, Arkansas.
- Coordinates: 35°46′25″N 91°38′29″W
- Country: United States
- State: Arkansas
- County: Independence
- Founded: 1821
- Incorporated: 1822

Government
  - Mayor: Rick Elumbaugh (D)

Area
  - Total: 11.71 sq mi (30.33 km^{2})
  - Land: 11.59 sq mi (30.03 km^{2})
  - Water: 0.12 sq mi (0.30 km^{2})
- Elevation: 377 ft (115 m)

Population (2020)
  - Total: 11,191
  - Estimate (2025): 11,860 ▲
  - Density: 965.1/sq mi (372.64/km^{2})
- Time zone: UTC-6 (CST)
  - Summer (DST): UTC-5 (CDT)
- ZIP codes: 72501, 72503
- Area code: 870
- FIPS code: 05-04030
- GNIS feature ID: 2403819
- Website: Official Website for the City of Batesville, Arkansas

Batesville is the largest city in and the county seat of Independence County, Arkansas, United States, 80 miles (128 km) northeast of Little Rock, the state capital. According to the 2020 census, the population of the city was 11,191. The city serves as a regional manufacturing and distribution hub for the Ozark Mountain region and Northeast Arkansas.

== History ==
Batesville is the second oldest municipality after the town of Georgetown — and the oldest city — in the state of Arkansas. It was named for the first territorial delegate from Arkansas to the Congress of the United States, James Woodson Bates, who settled in the town. The town has also gone by the names of Napoleon and Poke Bayou.

In early days, Batesville was an important port on the White River and served as an entry point to the interior of northern Arkansas. Batesville played a large role in the settling of the Ozark Mountains region and served as the central land office for northern Arkansas.

The first known settlement of the Batesville area was in 1810 near the mouth of Polk Bayou, and by 1819 the town had a ferry across the White River and about a dozen houses. The town was partially laid out in early 1821, and on March 3, 1822, a bill of assurance was recorded and executed and the town's plat was laid out. Batesville became the county seat in 1821. In January 1822, Judge Richard Searcy opened the town's first state circuit court. The town's first post office was established in 1822, and in 1830 became the home of a county court. On September 25, 1836, shortly after Arkansas was granted its statehood, Governor Conway incorporated Batesville Academy, the state's first academy. In the past, the area in and around the city had extensive quarries of manganese ore, phosphate rock, sandstone, limestone, and marble.

Between 1940 and 1941, Batesville had its own minor league baseball team within the Northeast Arkansas League known as the Batesville Pilots. The team later disbanded in 1941.

On July 31, 1964, singer Jim Reeves and his business partner and manager Dean Manuel left Batesville, en route to Nashville in a single-engine Beechcraft Debonair aircraft, N8972M, with Reeves at the controls. It crashed later that day near Nashville International Airport killing both on board.

Batesville currently has only one high school within the city limits, Batesville High School. Also, Batesville is the home of Lyon College, a private liberal arts college affiliated with the Presbyterian Church (U.S.A.), and noted for the annual Arkansas Scottish Festival each fall. In addition, the city is home to the University of Arkansas Community College at Batesville (UACCB), and NASCAR driver Mark Martin. It contains three National Register Historic Districts and many properties separately listed on the National Register of Historic Places. It was listed in Norman Crampton's 1992 book The 100 Best Small Towns in America, ranking at #75. In 2025, a $25 million dollar renovation started for Batesville's Riverside Park.

== Geography ==
Batesville is located at 35°46′25″N 91°38′29″W (35.773488, -91.641338). Batesville lies on the White River.

According to the United States Census Bureau, the city has a total area of 11.11 square miles (28.8 km^{2}), of which 10.98 square miles (28.4 km^{2}) is land and 0.13 square miles (0.3 km^{2}) (0.12%) is water.

== Climate ==
The climate in this area is characterized by hot, humid summers and generally mild to cool winters. According to the Köppen Climate Classification system, Batesville has a humid subtropical climate, abbreviated "Cfa" on climate maps.

Climate data for Batesville, Arkansas (1991–2020 normals, extremes 1948–present)
Month	Jan	Feb	Mar	Apr	May	Jun	Jul	Aug	Sep	Oct	Nov	Dec	Year
Record high °F (°C)	79 (26)	85 (29)	89 (32)	94 (34)	98 (37)	110 (43)	112 (44)	111 (44)	106 (41)	98 (37)	86 (30)	81 (27)	112 (44)
Mean maximum °F (°C)	68.3 (20.2)	72.6 (22.6)	79.3 (26.3)	84.3 (29.1)	89.1 (31.7)	95.3 (35.2)	98.8 (37.1)	99.0 (37.2)	95.0 (35.0)	86.8 (30.4)	77.1 (25.1)	69.7 (20.9)	101.2 (38.4)
Mean daily maximum °F (°C)	47.9 (8.8)	52.0 (11.1)	60.8 (16.0)	71.0 (21.7)	78.8 (26.0)	87.2 (30.7)	90.7 (32.6)	90.3 (32.4)	83.7 (28.7)	72.8 (22.7)	60.3 (15.7)	50.6 (10.3)	70.5 (21.4)
Daily mean °F (°C)	38.0 (3.3)	41.3 (5.2)	49.5 (9.7)	59.4 (15.2)	68.2 (20.1)	76.5 (24.7)	80.2 (26.8)	79.0 (26.1)	71.9 (22.2)	60.7 (15.9)	49.3 (9.6)	40.7 (4.8)	59.6 (15.3)
Mean daily minimum °F (°C)	28.2 (−2.1)	30.7 (−0.7)	38.1 (3.4)	47.7 (8.7)	57.6 (14.2)	65.7 (18.7)	69.6 (20.9)	67.7 (19.8)	60.1 (15.6)	48.6 (9.2)	38.3 (3.5)	30.8 (−0.7)	48.6 (9.2)
Mean minimum °F (°C)	12.0 (−11.1)	16.0 (−8.9)	22.6 (−5.2)	33.1 (0.6)	43.6 (6.4)	55.1 (12.8)	61.0 (16.1)	58.6 (14.8)	47.1 (8.4)	33.5 (0.8)	23.6 (−4.7)	16.2 (−8.8)	9.7 (−12.4)
Record low °F (°C)	−11 (−24)	−15 (−26)	9 (−13)	23 (−5)	30 (−1)	41 (5)	48 (9)	45 (7)	31 (−1)	20 (−7)	9 (−13)	−6 (−21)	−15 (−26)
Average precipitation inches (mm)	3.56 (90)	3.73 (95)	4.74 (120)	5.58 (142)	4.97 (126)	3.73 (95)	4.09 (104)	3.48 (88)	3.60 (91)	3.73 (95)	4.87 (124)	4.76 (121)	50.84 (1,291)
Average snowfall inches (cm)	0.6 (1.5)	0.8 (2.0)	0.4 (1.0)	0.0 (0.0)	0.0 (0.0)	0.0 (0.0)	0.0 (0.0)	0.0 (0.0)	0.0 (0.0)	0.0 (0.0)	0.1 (0.25)	0.3 (0.76)	2.2 (5.6)
Average precipitation days (≥ 0.01 in)	8.6	8.3	10.8	9.4	10.5	8.1	8.4	7.5	7.1	8.3	8.6	8.7	104.3
Average snowy days (≥ 0.1 in)	0.5	0.5	0.2	0.0	0.0	0.0	0.0	0.0	0.0	0.0	0.1	0.2	1.5
Source: NOAA

== Demographics ==
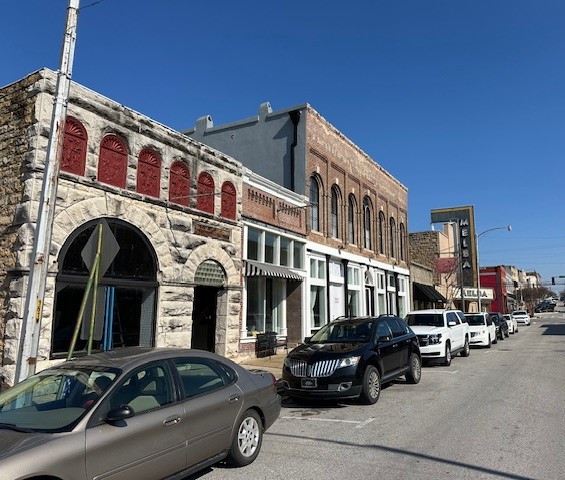
Batesville AR Downtown, 2-2025

Historical population
Census	Pop.	Note	%±
1850	848		—
1860	920		8.5%
1870	881		−4.2%
1880	1,264		43.5%
1890	2,150		70.1%
1900	2,327		8.2%
1910	3,399		46.1%
1920	4,299		26.5%
1930	4,484		4.3%
1940	5,267		17.5%
1950	6,414		21.8%
1960	6,207		−3.2%
1970	7,209		16.1%
1980	8,447		17.2%
1990	9,187		8.8%
2000	9,445		2.8%
2010	10,248		8.5%
2020	11,191		9.2%
2025 (est.)	11,860	▲	6.0%
U.S. Decennial Census

=== 2020 census ===
As of the 2020 census, there were 11,191 people, 3,985 households, and 2,448 families residing in the city.

The median age was 35.3 years. 24.3% of residents were under the age of 18 and 17.6% of residents were 65 years of age or older. For every 100 females there were 96.8 males, and for every 100 females age 18 and over there were 93.6 males age 18 and over.

91.0% of residents lived in urban areas, while 9.0% lived in rural areas.

Of all households, 31.2% had children under the age of 18 living in them. 41.1% were married-couple households, 20.1% were households with a male householder and no spouse or partner present, and 32.2% were households with a female householder and no spouse or partner present. About 35.4% of all households were made up of individuals and 16.5% had someone living alone who was 65 years of age or older.

There were 4,815 housing units, of which 9.4% were vacant. The homeowner vacancy rate was 3.4% and the rental vacancy rate was 7.8%.

Batesville racial composition
Race	Number	Percentage
White (non-Hispanic)	7,807	69.76%
Black or African American (non-Hispanic)	479	4.28%
Native American	39	0.35%
Asian	222	1.98%
Pacific Islander	12	0.11%
Other/Mixed	529	4.73%
Hispanic or Latino	2,103	18.79%

=== 2010 census ===
As of the census of 2010, there were 10,243 people, 3,777 households, and 2,383 families residing in the city. The population density was 907.3 inhabitants per square mile (350.3/km^{2}). There were 4,146 housing units at an average density of 398.3 per square mile (153.8/km^{2}). The racial makeup of the city was 83.2% White, 4.3% Black or African American, 0.6% Native American, 1.5% Asian, 0.3% Pacific Islander, 1.40% from other races, and 2.00% from two or more races. 4.6% of the population were Hispanics or Latinos of any race.

There were 3,777 households, out of which 28.5% had children under the age of 18 living with them, 49.4% were married couples living together, 10.5% had a female householder with no husband present, and 36.9% were non-families. 33.8% of all households were made up of individuals, and 16.9% had someone living alone who was 65 years of age or older. The average household size was 2.28 and the average family size was 2.92.

The age distribution was 22.0% under the age of 18, 12.0% from 18 to 24, 25.6% from 25 to 44, 22.2% from 45 to 64, and 18.2% who were 65 years of age or older. The median age was 38 years. For every 100 females, there were 88.0 males. For every 100 females age 18 and over, there were 84.1 males.

The median income for a household in the city was $33,133, and the median income for a family was $42,634. Males had a median income of $31,068 versus $20,506 for females. The per capita income for the city was $17,753. About 11.1% of families and 14.5% of the population were below the poverty line, including 15.1% of those under age 18 and 16.6% of those age 65 or over.

== Education ==
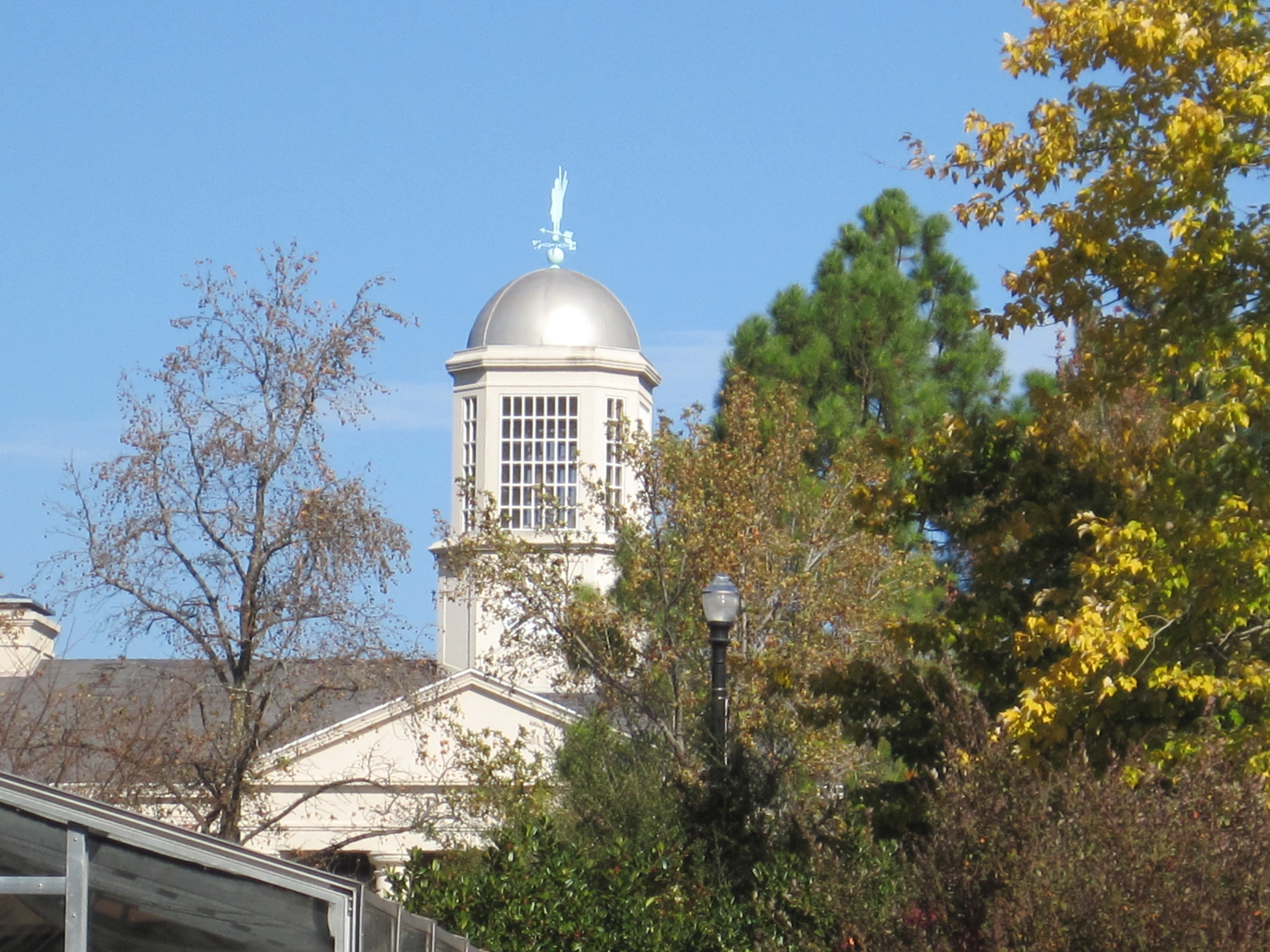
Lyon College

Batesville Public Schools are part of the Batesville School District. The district has one early learning center, one junior high school, one high school and three elementary schools. Students attend Batesville High School.

== Infrastructure ==
=== List of highways ===
- U.S. Highway 167
- Arkansas Highway 25
- Arkansas Highway 69
- Arkansas Highway 69 Business
- Arkansas Highway 106
- Arkansas Highway 233
- Arkansas Highway 394

== Notable people ==
- Elisha Baxter, 13th governor of Arkansas
- Jack Critcher, local and state politician
- Townsend Dickinson, Arkansas territorial councilman and state representative and founding justice of Arkansas Supreme Court
- Monroe L. Flinn, Illinois state representative
- Ryan Mallett, quarterback for Arkansas Razorbacks and NFL's Baltimore Ravens, born in Batesville
- Mark Martin, member of the NASCAR Hall of Fame born and raised in Batesville
- James McLean, Democrat former member of the Arkansas House of Representatives for Independence County
- Mike McQueen, lived in Batesville after retiring from Major League Baseball and died in Batesville in 2017
- William R. Miller, first native-born governor of Arkansas, born in Batesville 1823
- Tommy E. Mitchum, member of the Arkansas House of Representatives
- Rick Monday, Major League Baseball player and Los Angeles Dodgers broadcaster, born in Batesville
- Leslie Rutledge, Arkansas Lieutenant Governor; Attorney General 2015-23
- Charlie Strong, football head coach at University of South Florida, former Texas and Louisville coach
- James Sturch, Republican member of Arkansas House of Representatives for Independence County since 2015
- Mutha's Day Out, 1990s rock band
- Sami Jo, country singer

== Historic sites ==
Batesville locations on the National Register of Historic Places include the Adler House, Bartlett-Kirk House, the Batesville Commercial Historic District, the Batesville Confederate Monument, the Batesville East Main Historic District, the Batesville Overpass, the Bethel African Methodist Episcopal Church, the Central Avenue Bridge, the Cook-Morrow House, the Edward Dickinson House, the Garrott House, the Glenn House, the Charles R. Handford House, the James S. Handford House, the Dr. Paul H. Jeffery House and Office, the Luster Urban Farmstead, Morrow Hall, the National Guard Armory, the Ruddell Mill Site, St. Paul’s Parish Church, the School Addition Historic District, the Spring Mill, the Captain John T. Warner House, the Wheel Store, and the Wycough-Jones House.

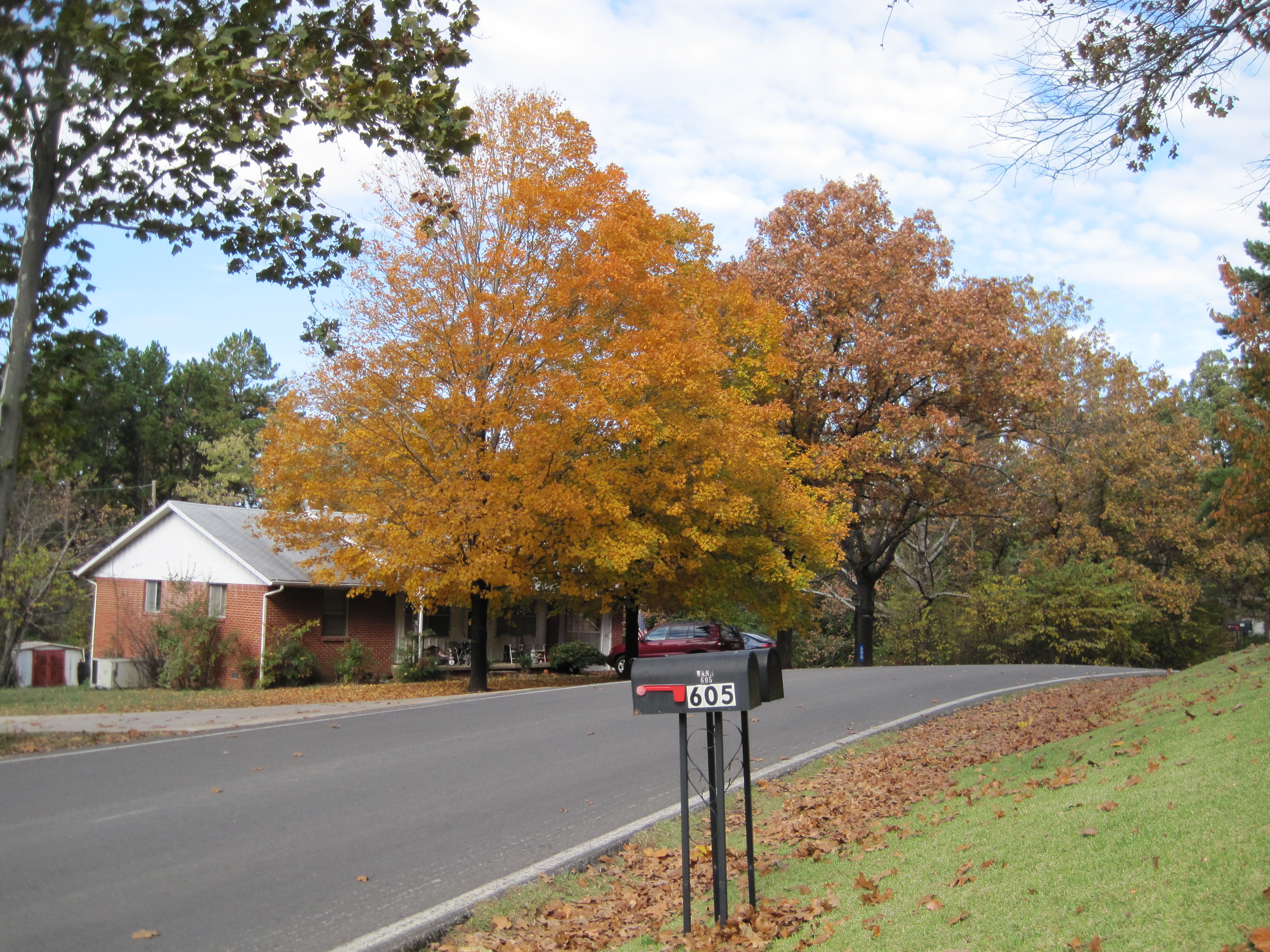
Josephine Street in the fall

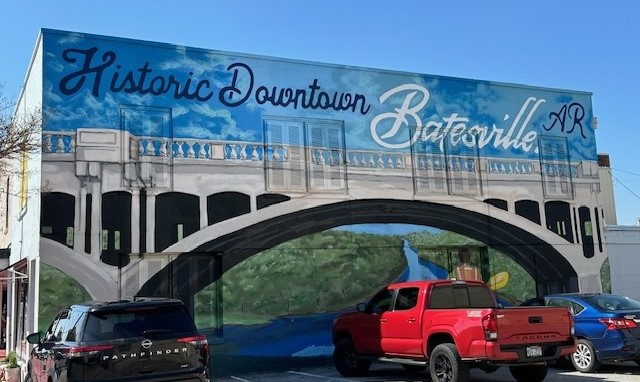
Batesville AR Bridge Mural, 2-2025

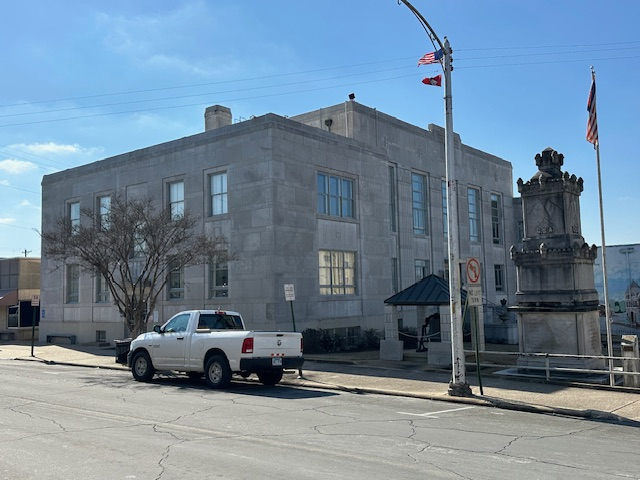
Independence County Courthouse (Batesville AR), 2-2025

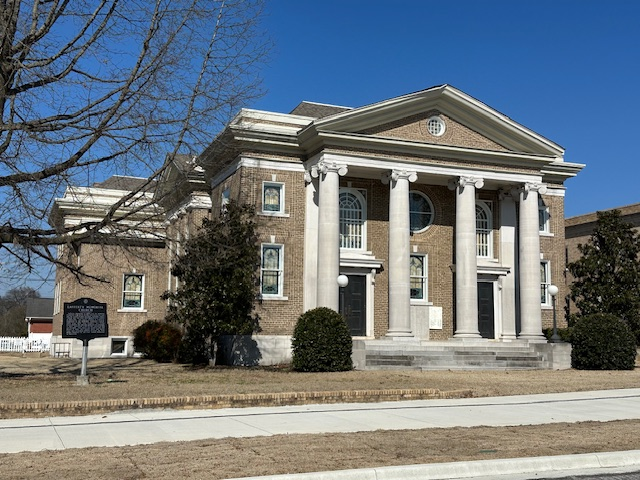
First United Methodist Church, Batesville AR, 2-2025

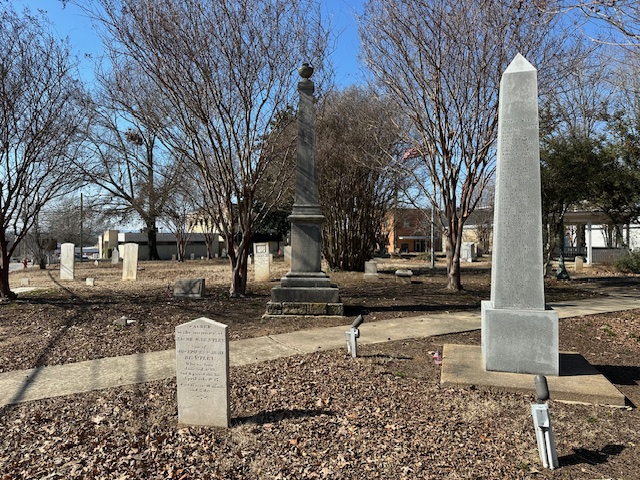
Batesville AR Pioneer Cemetery, 2-2025
