= Melbourne, Arkansas =

- City
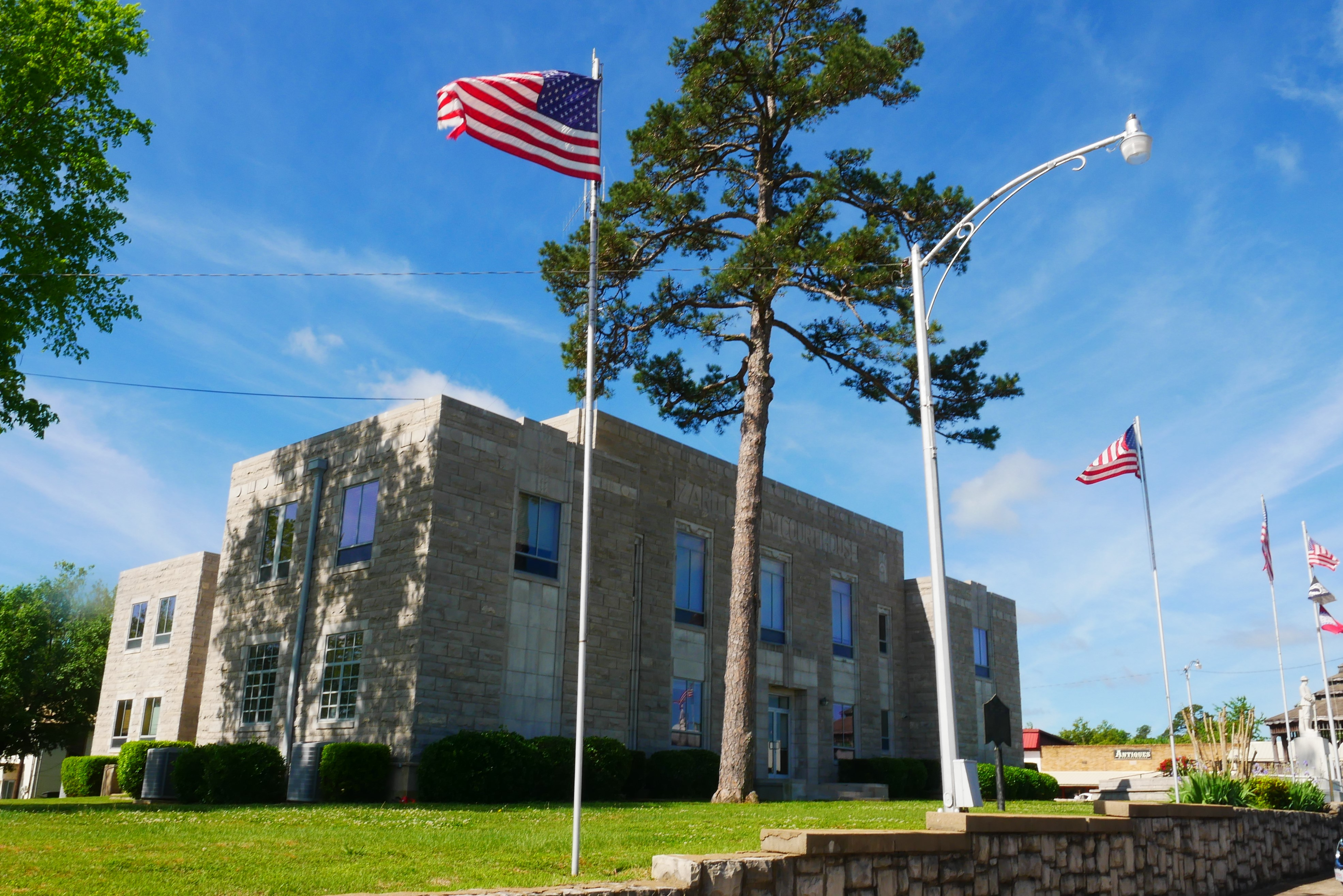
- Izard County Courthouse

- Location of Melbourne in Izard County, Arkansas.
- Coordinates: 36°3′35″N 91°53′40″W
- Country: United States
- State: Arkansas
- County: Izard

Area
  - Total: 6.98 sq mi (18.07 km^{2})
  - Land: 6.98 sq mi (18.07 km^{2})
  - Water: 0 sq mi (0.00 km^{2})
- Elevation: 653 ft (199 m)

Population (2020)
  - Total: 1,830
  - Estimate (2025): 1,892 ▲
  - Density: 262.3/sq mi (101.28/km^{2})
- Time zone: UTC-6 (Central (CST))
  - Summer (DST): UTC-5 (CDT)
- ZIP code: 72556
- Area code: 870
- FIPS code: 05-45080
- GNIS feature ID: 2405065
- Website: cityofmelbournear.gov

Melbourne is a city in and the county seat of Izard County, Arkansas, United States. As of the 2020 census, Melbourne had a population of 1,830. It is home to the main campus of Ozarka College.

== Geography ==
Melbourne is located at 36°03′35″N 91°53′40″W.

According to the United States Census Bureau, the city has a total area of 6.2 square miles (16 km^{2}), all land.

=== List of highways ===
- Arkansas Highway 9
- Arkansas Highway 69

== Demographics ==
Historical population
Census	Pop.	Note	%±
1880	149		—
1890	209		40.3%
1900	256		22.5%
1910	282		10.2%
1920	295		4.6%
1930	380		28.8%
1940	567		49.2%
1950	568		0.2%
1960	571		0.5%
1970	1,043		82.7%
1980	1,619		55.2%
1990	1,562		−3.5%
2000	1,673		7.1%
2010	1,848		10.5%
2020	1,830		−1.0%
2025 (est.)	1,892	▲	3.4%
U.S. Decennial Census

=== 2020 census ===
Melbourne racial composition
Race	Number	Percentage
White (non-Hispanic)	1,656	90.49%
Black or African American (non-Hispanic)	18	0.98%
Native American	6	0.33%
Asian	2	0.11%
Other/Mixed	99	5.41%
Hispanic or Latino	49	2.68%

As of the 2020 census, Melbourne had a population of 1,830. The median age was 39.9 years. 21.9% of residents were under the age of 18 and 22.7% were 65 years of age or older. For every 100 females there were 86.5 males, and for every 100 females age 18 and over there were 81.9 males.

0.0% of residents lived in urban areas, while 100.0% lived in rural areas.

There were 763 households in Melbourne, including 422 families. Of all households, 30.3% had children under the age of 18 living in them. 38.1% were married-couple households, 18.6% were households with a male householder and no spouse or partner present, and 36.6% were households with a female householder and no spouse or partner present. About 36.7% of all households were made up of individuals, and 17.6% had someone living alone who was 65 years of age or older.

There were 899 housing units, of which 15.1% were vacant. The homeowner vacancy rate was 4.1% and the rental vacancy rate was 15.4%.

=== 2010 census ===
At the 2010 census there were 1,848 people in 787 households, including 476 families, in the city. The population density was 268.0 inhabitants per square mile (103.5/km^{2}). There were 838 housing units at an average density of 134.2 per square mile (51.8/km^{2}). The racial makeup of the city was 97.55% White, 0.36% Native American, 0.18% Asian, 0.42% from other races, and 1.49% from two or more races. Hispanic or Latino of any race were 0.60%.

Of the 736 households 25.8% had children under the age of 18 living with them, 45.1% were married couples living together, 13.3% had a female householder with no husband present, and 39.0% were non-families. 35.3% of households were one person and 17.4% were one person aged 65 or older. The average household size was 2.15 and the average family size was 2.78.

The age distribution was 21.9% under the age of 18, 9.9% from 18 to 24, 24.4% from 25 to 44, 22.7% from 45 to 64, and 21.2% 65 or older. The median age was 40 years. For every 100 females, there were 83.2 males. For every 100 females age 18 and over, there were 76.5 males.

The median household income was $22,757 and the median family income was $31,900. Males had a median income of $23,529 versus $18,264 for females. The per capita income for the city was $13,110. About 14.5% of families and 18.4% of the population were below the poverty line, including 25.9% of those under age 18 and 21.9% of those age 65 or over.

== Education ==
Public education for elementary and secondary school students is available from Melbourne School District, which leads students to graduate from Melbourne High School. The school's athletic emblem and mascot is the Bearkatz.

== Notable people ==
- Michelle Gray - Republican member of the Arkansas House of Representatives for District 62
- Glen D. Johnson - Member of the United States House of Representatives for Oklahoma's 4th congressional district

== Gallery ==
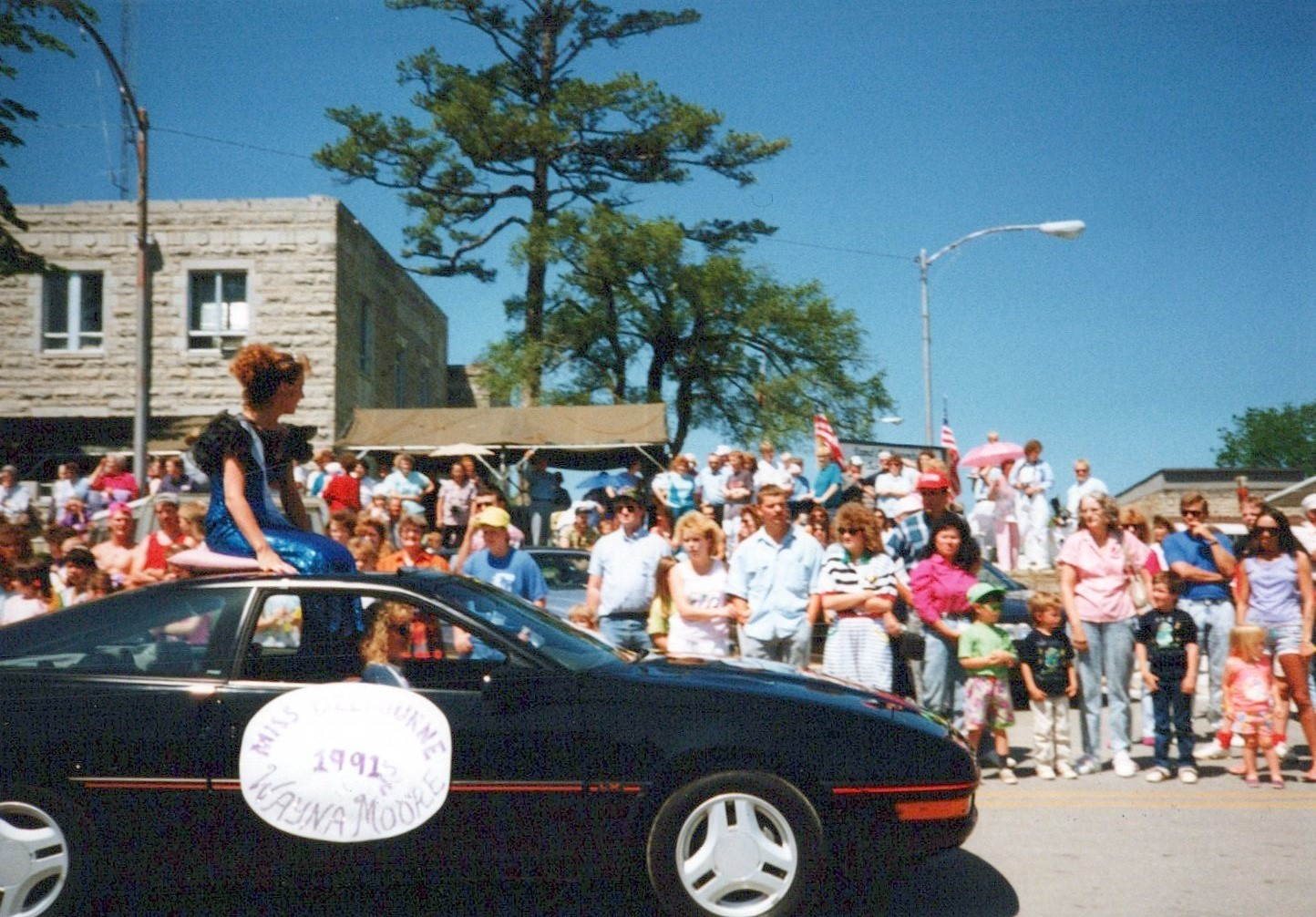
Pioneer Day 1991 - Zelda Shaw "Miss Melbourne"

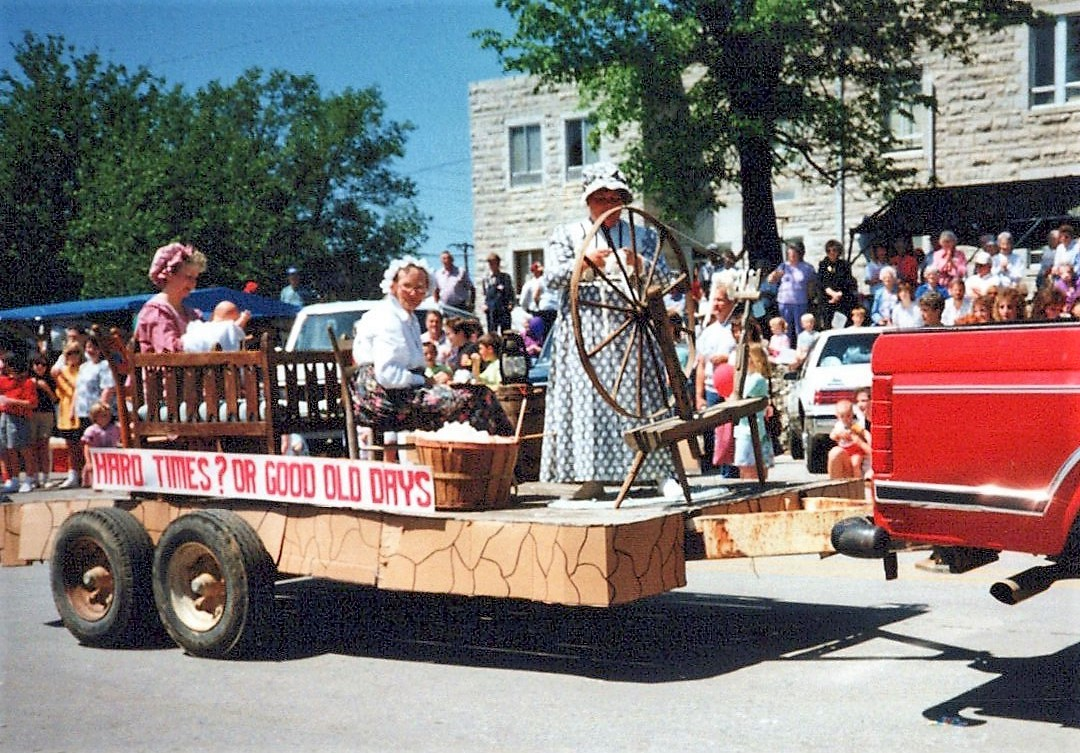
Hard Times or Good Ole Days Float 1991

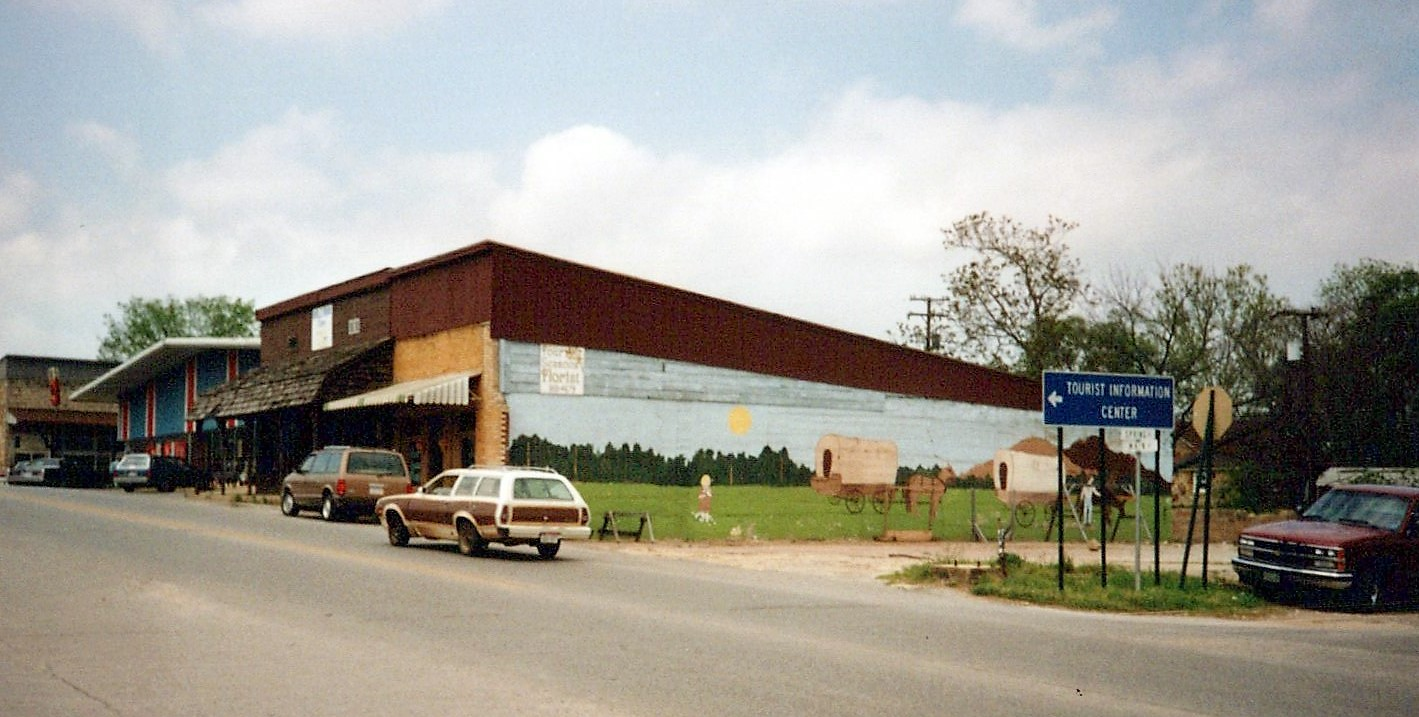
Melbourne Downtown Mural - 1991
