= National Register of Historic Places listings in Independence County, Arkansas =

Location of Independence County in Arkansas

This is a list of the National Register of Historic Places listings in Independence County, Arkansas.

This is intended to be a complete list of the properties and districts on the National Register of Historic Places in Independence County, Arkansas, United States. The locations of National Register properties and districts for which the latitude and longitude coordinates are included below, may be seen in a map.

There are 45 properties and districts listed on the National Register in the county. Another 2 properties were once listed but were removed.

Contents: Counties in Arkansas
- Arkansas
- Ashley
- Baxter
- Benton
- Boone
- Bradley
- Calhoun
- Carroll
- Chicot
- Clark
- Clay
- Cleburne
- Cleveland
- Columbia
- Conway
- Craighead
- Crawford
- Crittenden
- Cross
- Dallas
- Desha
- Drew
- Faulkner
- Franklin
- Fulton
- Garland
- Grant
- Greene
- Hempstead
- Hot Spring
- Howard
- Independence
- Izard
- Jackson
- Jefferson
- Johnson
- Lafayette
- Lawrence
- Lee
- Lincoln
- Little River
- Logan
- Lonoke
- Madison
- Marion
- Miller
- Mississippi
- Monroe
- Montgomery
- Nevada
- Newton
- Ouachita
- Perry
- Phillips
- Pike
- Poinsett
- Polk
- Pope
- Prairie
- Pulaski (Little Rock)
- Randolph
- St. Francis
- Saline
- Scott
- Searcy
- Sebastian
- Sevier
- Sharp
- Stone
- Union
- Van Buren
- Washington
- White
- Woodruff
- Yell

This National Park Service list is complete through NPS recent listings posted June 26, 2026.

== Current listings ==
	Name on the Register	Image	Date listed	Location	City or town	Description
1	Adler House	Adler House	December 22, 1982 (#82000833)	292 Boswell St. 35°46′09″N 91°39′02″W	Batesville	
2	Akron Cemetery	Akron Cemetery	October 4, 2002 (#02001072)	Approximately 2 miles south of Newark on Highway 122; 35°39′53″N 91°26′58″W	Newark	
3	Bartlett-Kirk House	Bartlett-Kirk House	August 16, 1994 (#94000856)	910 College St. 35°46′25″N 91°38′41″W	Batesville	
4	Batesville Commercial Historic District	Batesville Commercial Historic District	October 7, 1982 (#82000834)	Main and Central Sts.; also Main St. from north of Central to one block north of Church; also roughly Main between State & 5th Sts., Broad between Main & Boswell Sts., Central Ave. between College Ave. & RR. 35°46′19″N 91°39′14″W	Batesville	Second and third sets of address represent boundary increases approved October 5, 1990 and January 24, 2019.
5	Batesville Confederate Monument	Batesville Confederate Monument	May 3, 1996 (#96000504)	Northeastern corner of the courthouse lawn, at the junction of S. Broad St. and W. Main St. 35°46′13″N 91°39′10″W	Batesville	
6	Batesville East Main Historic District	Batesville East Main Historic District	December 22, 1983 (#83003546)	Main St. between 7th and 11th Sts.; also 1011, 1041, 1063, and 1087 College Ave. 35°46′28″N 91°38′45″W	Batesville	College Avenue addresses represent a boundary increase of December 27, 1996
7	Batesville Overpass		September 17, 2021 (#100006924)	AR 233 over Union Pacific RR and Miller Cr. 35°46′52″N 91°37′33″W	Batesville	
8	Bethel African Methodist Episcopal Church	Bethel African Methodist Episcopal Church	October 16, 1986 (#86002875)	895 Oak St. 35°46′20″N 91°38′14″W	Batesville	
9	Big Botton Slough Bridge	Big Botton Slough Bridge	September 24, 2004 (#04001042)	County Road 58 (Padgett Island Rd.), approximately 2.5 miles south of Highway 69; 35°40′19″N 91°28′38″W	Magness	
10	Cedar Creek Bridge	Cedar Creek Bridge	May 18, 1995 (#95000613)	County Road 235 over Cedar Creek, approximately 1.5 miles south of its junction with Highway 14; 35°38′34″N 91°32′26″W	Rosie	
11	Central Avenue Bridge	Central Avenue Bridge	January 21, 2010 (#09001248)	Central Avenue over Polk Bayou; 35°46′16″N 91°39′19″W	Batesville	
12	Cook-Morrow House	Cook-Morrow House	July 29, 1977 (#77000256)	875 Main St. 35°46′27″N 91°38′50″W	Batesville	
13	Dearing House	Dearing House	May 3, 1976 (#76000419)	Highway 122; 35°42′09″N 91°26′23″W	Newark	
14	Franklin Desha House		October 9, 1986 (#86002844)	Address Restricted	Desha	
15	Edward Dickinson House	Edward Dickinson House	November 26, 1986 (#86002907)	672 E. Boswell St. 35°46′17″N 91°38′48″W	Batesville	
16	Dondy Building	Dondy Building	December 22, 1982 (#82000824)	154 S. 3rd 35°46′14″N 91°39′06″W	Batesville	Demolished sometime before January 2019
17	Dry Run Bridge		September 26, 2022 (#100008153)	AR 106 over Dry Run; 35°46′29″N 91°42′05″W	Bethesda vicinity	
18	Garrott House	Garrott House	June 24, 1971 (#71000125)	561 E. Main St. 35°46′21″N 91°38′59″W	Batesville	
19	Glenn House	Glenn House	May 2, 1975 (#75000389)	653 Water St. 35°46′26″N 91°38′58″W	Batesville	
20	Goff Petroglyph Site		May 4, 1982 (#82002117)	Address Restricted	Salado	
21	Charles R. Handford House	Charles R. Handford House	May 2, 1975 (#75000390)	658 E. Boswell St. 35°46′16″N 91°38′49″W	Batesville	
22	James S. Handford House	James S. Handford House	May 2, 1975 (#75000391)	659 E. Boswell St. 35°46′18″N 91°38′50″W	Batesville	
23	Hankins' Store	Hankins' Store	May 23, 2014 (#14000248)	NE. corner of Ferry Rd. & Main St. 35°37′56″N 91°27′47″W	Oil Trough	
24	Hulsey Bend School	Hulsey Bend School	February 12, 1999 (#99000153)	Freeze Bend Rd., 0.7 miles east of the junction of Highways 14 and 122; 35°38′07″N 91°25′05″W	Oil Trough	
25	Jamestown School	Jamestown School	September 4, 1992 (#92001106)	North of Highway 230; 35°41′50″N 91°42′13″W	Jamestown	
26	Dr. Paul H. Jeffery House and Office	Dr. Paul H. Jeffery House and Office	May 18, 2023 (#100008978)	50 Earnheart Rd. 35°47′25″N 91°47′11″W	Batesville	
27	Lee's Chapel Church and Masonic Hall	Lee's Chapel Church and Masonic Hall	May 10, 2001 (#01000482)	8 miles east on Sandtown Rd. 35°54′09″N 91°38′32″W	Cushman	
28	Luster Urban Farmstead	Luster Urban Farmstead	September 16, 1983 (#83001158)	487 N. Central Ave. 35°46′20″N 91°39′24″W	Batesville	
29	Miller Creek Bridge	Miller Creek Bridge	January 21, 2010 (#09001249)	County Road 86 over Miller Creek; 35°47′00″N 91°37′10″W	Batesville	
30	Mitchell House	Mitchell House	December 22, 1982 (#82000835)	1138 Main St. 35°46′33″N 91°38′36″W	Batesville	
31	Moorefield School	Moorefield School	September 4, 1992 (#92001109)	65 Ham St. 35°45′57″N 91°34′12″W	Moorefield	
32	Morrow Hall	Morrow Hall	October 18, 1972 (#72000205)	7th and Boswell Sts. 35°46′21″N 91°38′35″W	Batesville	
33	National Guard Armory	National Guard Armory	May 29, 1998 (#98000579)	380 S. 9th St. 35°46′21″N 91°38′37″W	Batesville	
34	Pfeiffer House		May 1, 1989 (#89000172)	U.S. Route 167; 35°49′48″N 91°35′31″W	Pfeiffer	
35	Ruddell Mill Site	Ruddell Mill Site	August 28, 2007 (#07000434)	Address Restricted	Batesville	
36	St. Paul's Parish Church	St. Paul's Parish Church	December 22, 1982 (#82000836)	5th and Main; 35°46′19″N 91°39′00″W	Batesville	
37	School Addition Historic District	School Addition Historic District	February 1, 2007 (#06001315)	560–770 Water, 210–293 N. 7th, 709–897 Rock, and 215–280 N. 8th 35°46′28″N 91°38′56″W	Batesville	
38	Spring Mill	Spring Mill	March 1, 1974 (#74000477)	Northwest of Batesville on Highway 69; 35°49′42″N 91°43′24″W	Batesville	
39	Thida Grove School	Thida Grove School	September 4, 1992 (#92001108)	County Road 20; 35°34′16″N 91°27′58″W	Thida	
40	Walnut Grove Cemetery	Walnut Grove Cemetery	September 30, 2013 (#13000786)	Walden Rd. 35°50′16″N 91°23′14″W	Cord	
41	Capt. John T. Warner House	Capt. John T. Warner House	September 2, 1982 (#82002115)	822 E. College St. 35°46′23″N 91°38′44″W	Batesville	
42	The Wheel Store	The Wheel Store	December 8, 1988 (#88002822)	River and Broad Sts. 35°46′03″N 91°39′00″W	Batesville	
43	Wyatt House	Wyatt House	March 5, 1999 (#99000263)	Junction of Highway 25 and Gainer Ferry Rd. 35°44′13″N 91°40′31″W	Desha	
44	Wyatt Petroglyphs		May 4, 1982 (#82002116)	Address Restricted	Desha	
45	Wycough–Jones House	Wycough–Jones House	May 2, 1975 (#75000393)	683 Water St. 35°46′27″N 91°38′57″W	Batesville	

== Former listing ==
	Name on the Register	Image	Date listed	Date removed	Location	City or town	Description
1	Locust Grove School	Locust Grove School	September 4, 1992 (#92001107)	January 23, 2008	Highway 230 south of its junction with Highway 25; 35°46′27″N 91°38′57″W	Locust Grove	
2	Uriah Maxfield House		May 2, 1975 (#75000392)	June 3, 1986	410 E. Harrison St.	Batesville	

== See also ==
- List of National Historic Landmarks in Arkansas
- National Register of Historic Places listings in Arkansas
