= Batesville East Main Historic District =

Historic district in Arkansas, United States

- U.S. National Register of Historic Places
- U.S. Historic district
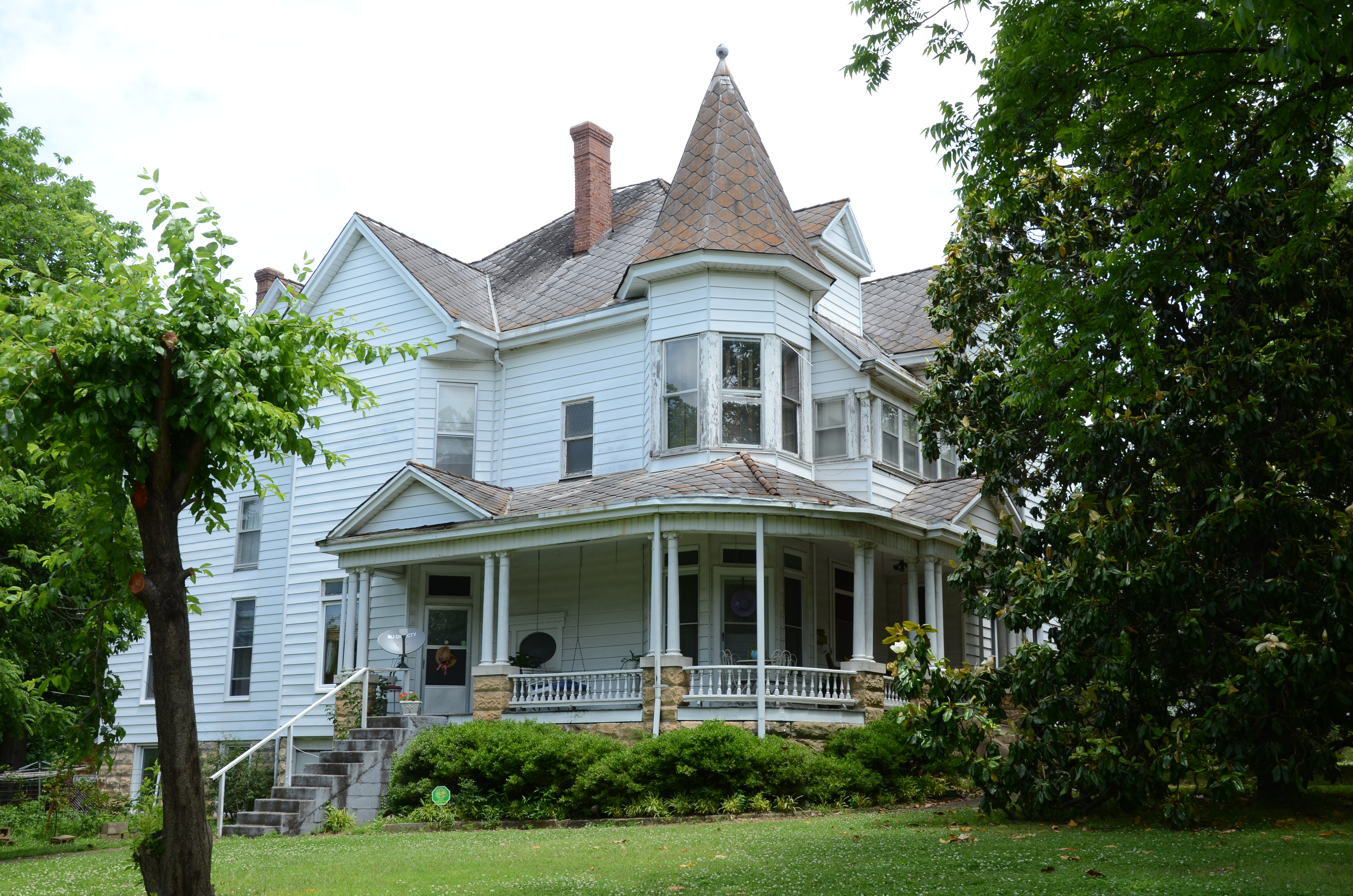

- Location within Arkansas Location within the United States
- Location: Main St. between 7th and 11th Sts., Batesville, Arkansas; also 1011, 1041, 1063, and 1087 College Ave.
- Coordinates: 35°46′26″N 91°39′34″W
- Area: 4 acres (1.6 ha) (original) less than one acre (size of increase)
- Built: 1877
- Architect: Multiple
- Architectural style: Italianate
- NRHP reference No.: 83003546 (original); 96001520 (increase)

Significant dates
- Added to NRHP: December 22, 1983
- Boundary increase: December 27, 1996

The Batesville East Main Historic District is a residential historic district in Batesville, Arkansas. When first listed on the National Register of Historic Places in 1983, it encompassed a four-block stretch of Main Street (between 7th and 11th Streets) that was plotted out in 1848, as growth of the city expanded to the northeast from its original nucleus. It was expanded in 1996 to include buildings on College Avenue between 10th and 11th Streets, which abut the original district bounds. Four houses survive that predate the American Civil War, although three of these were restyled later in the 19th century. Most of the properties were built before 1910, and are either vernacular or Colonial Revival in style. There are only a small number of Queen Anne, Shingle, and Craftsman style buildings. Two were designed by noted Arkansas architect Charles L. Thompson, and one, the Cook-Morrow House, is separately listed on the National Register.

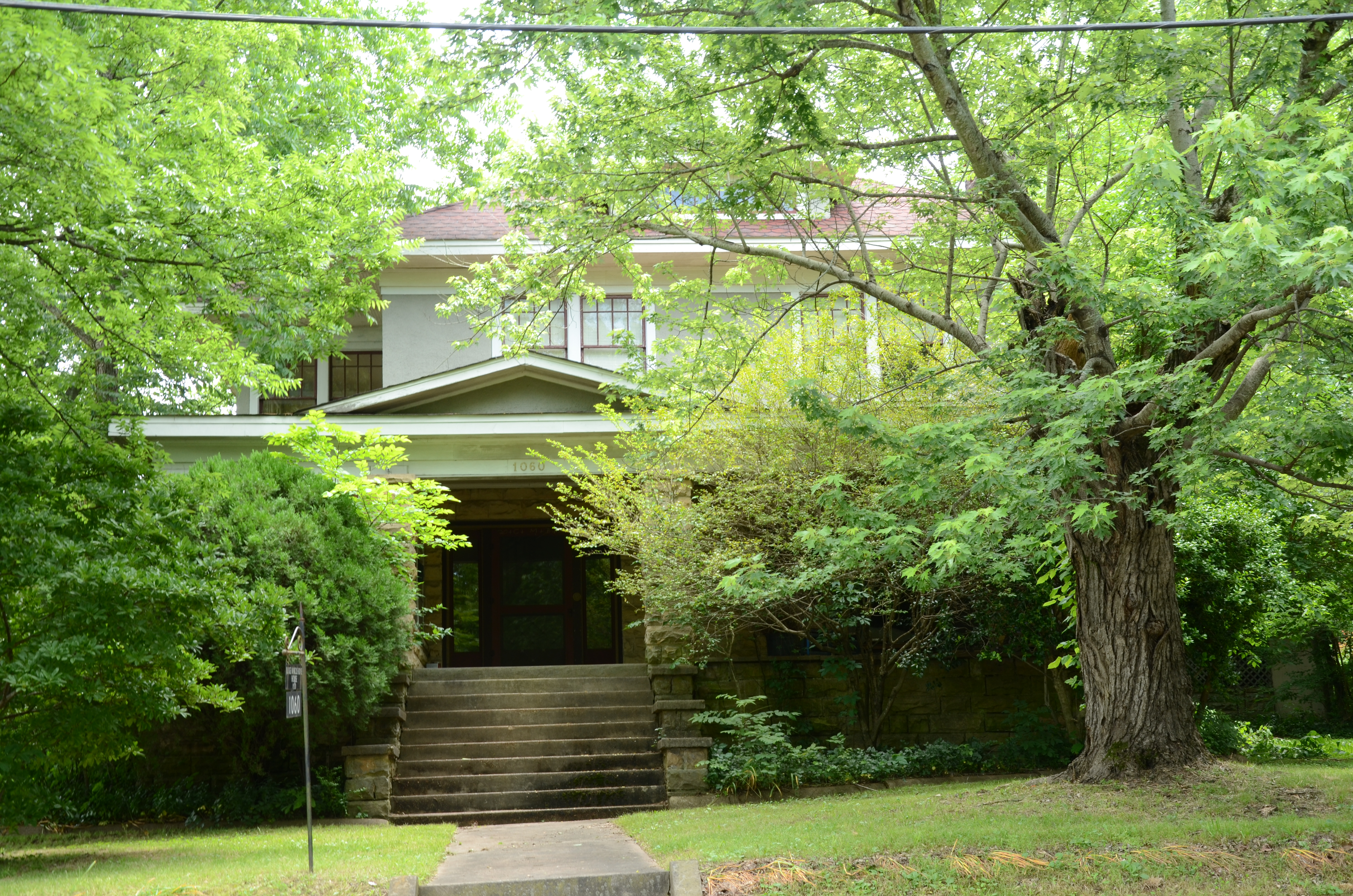

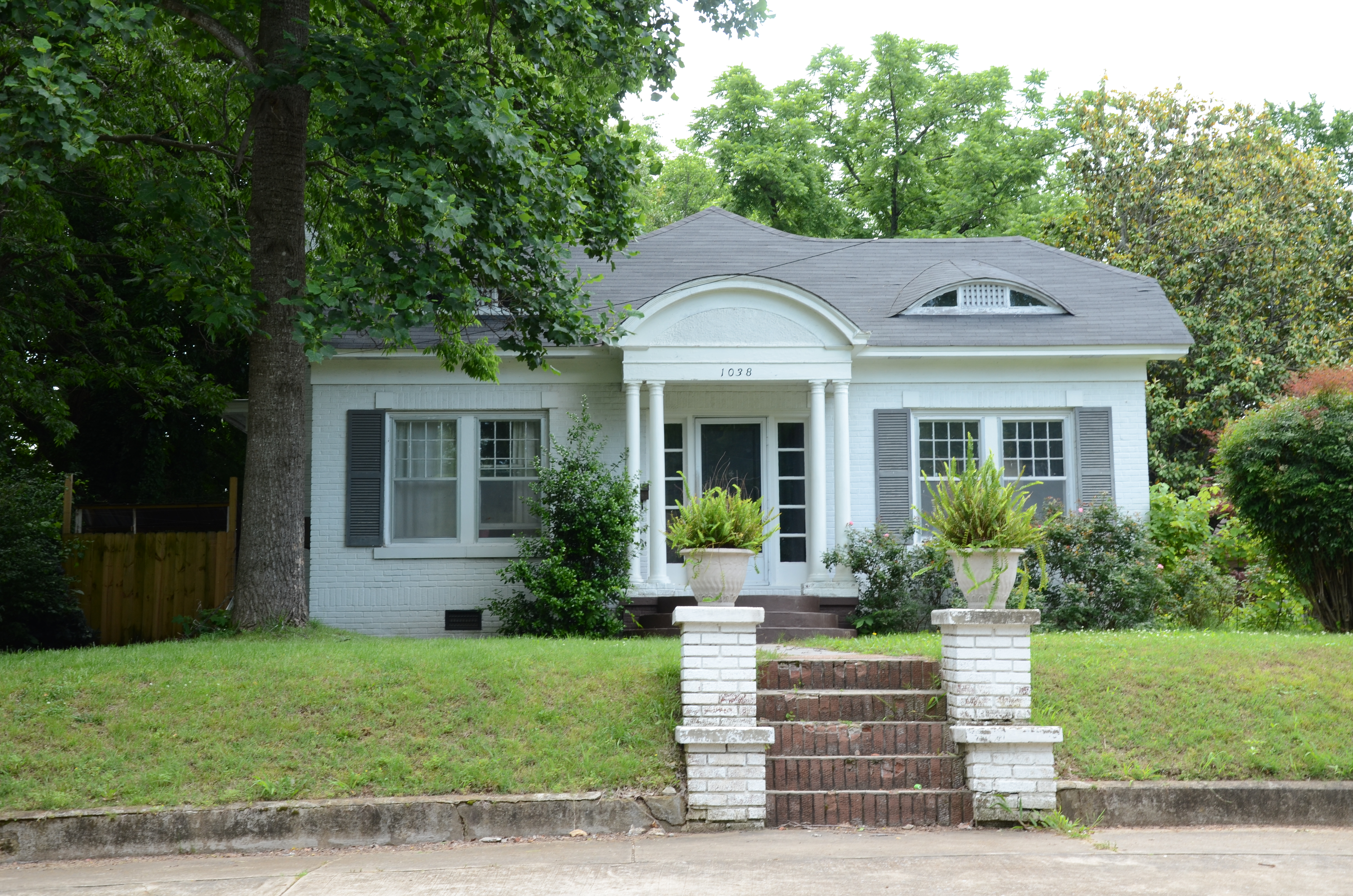

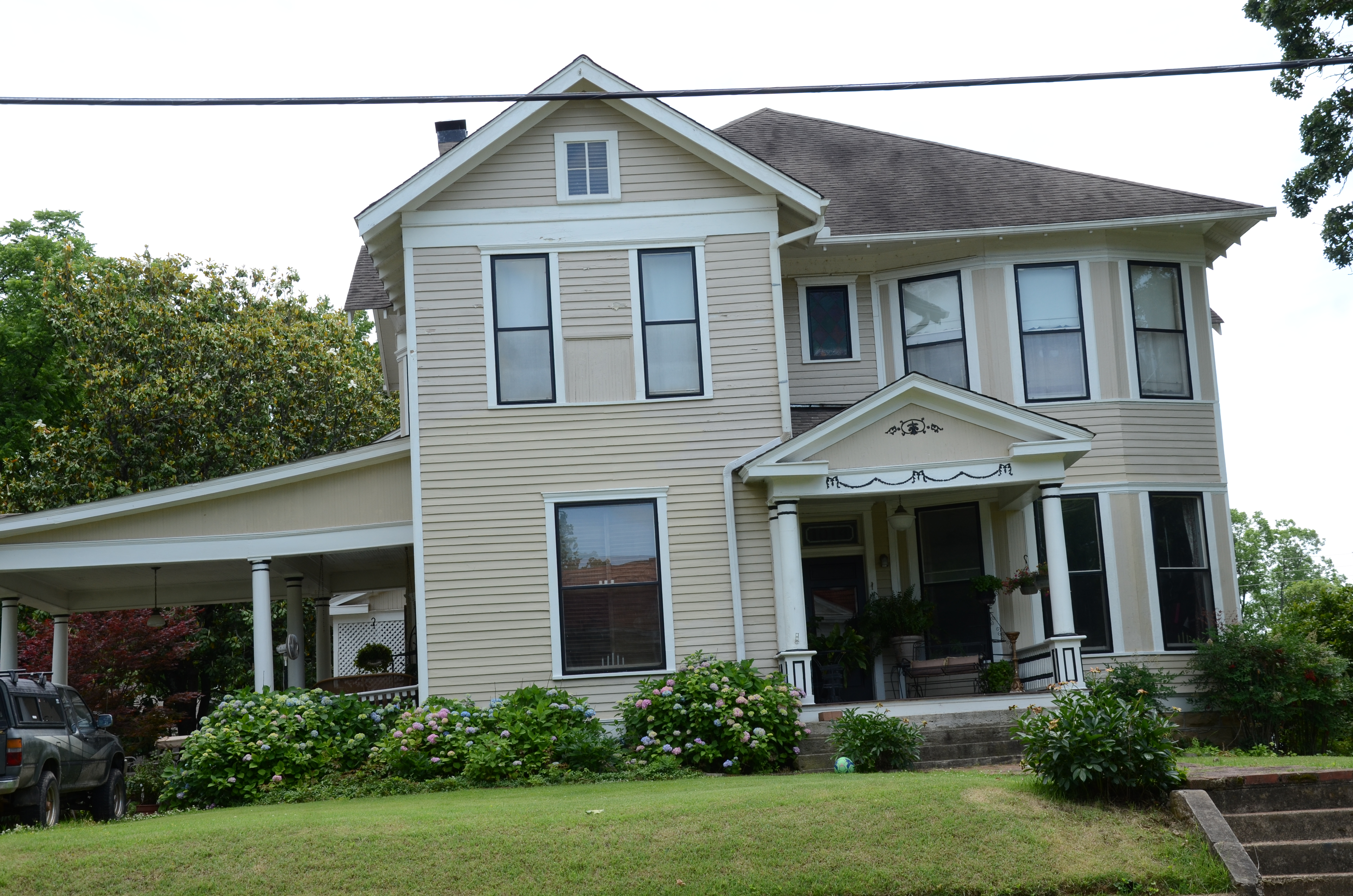

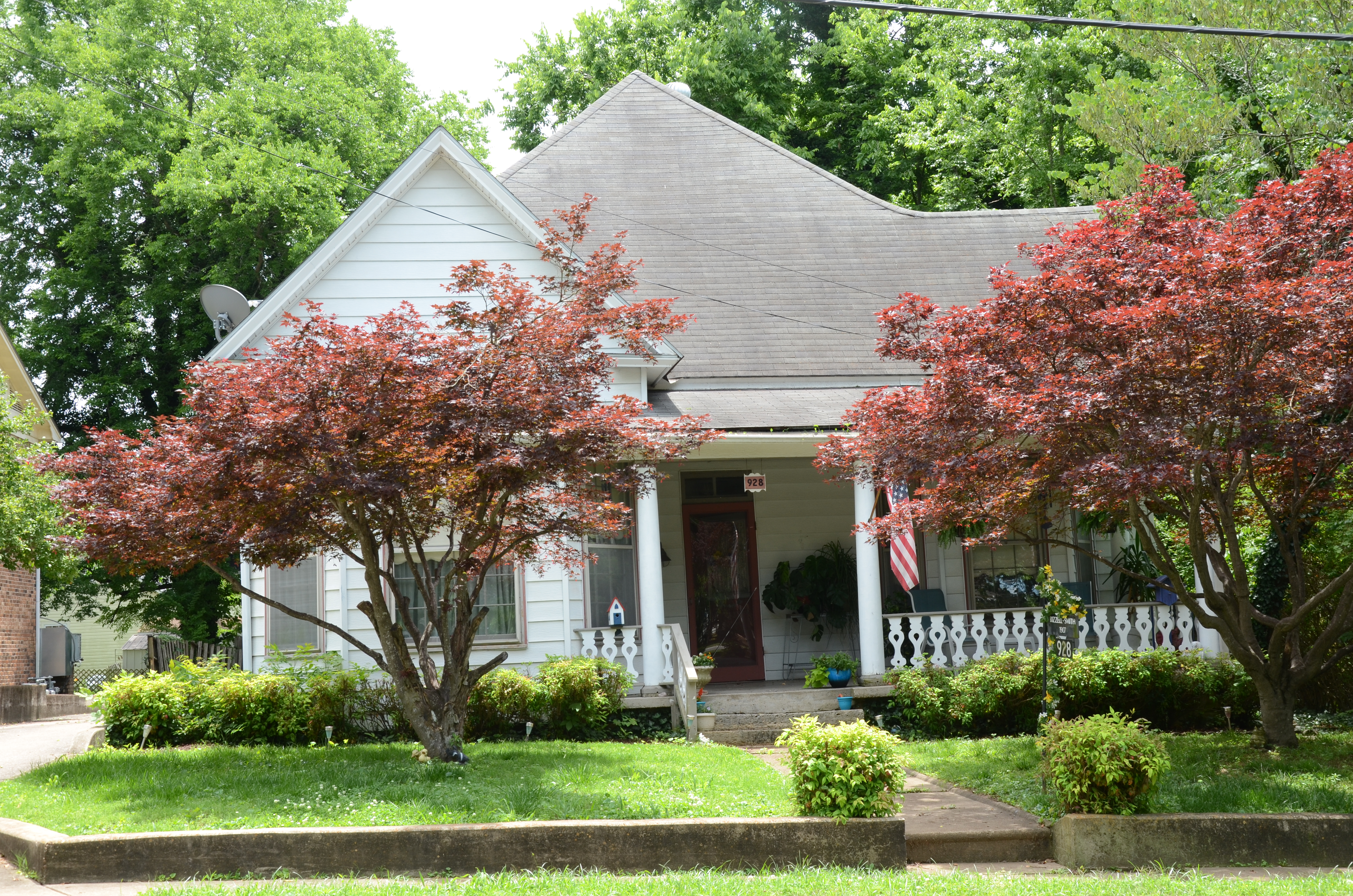

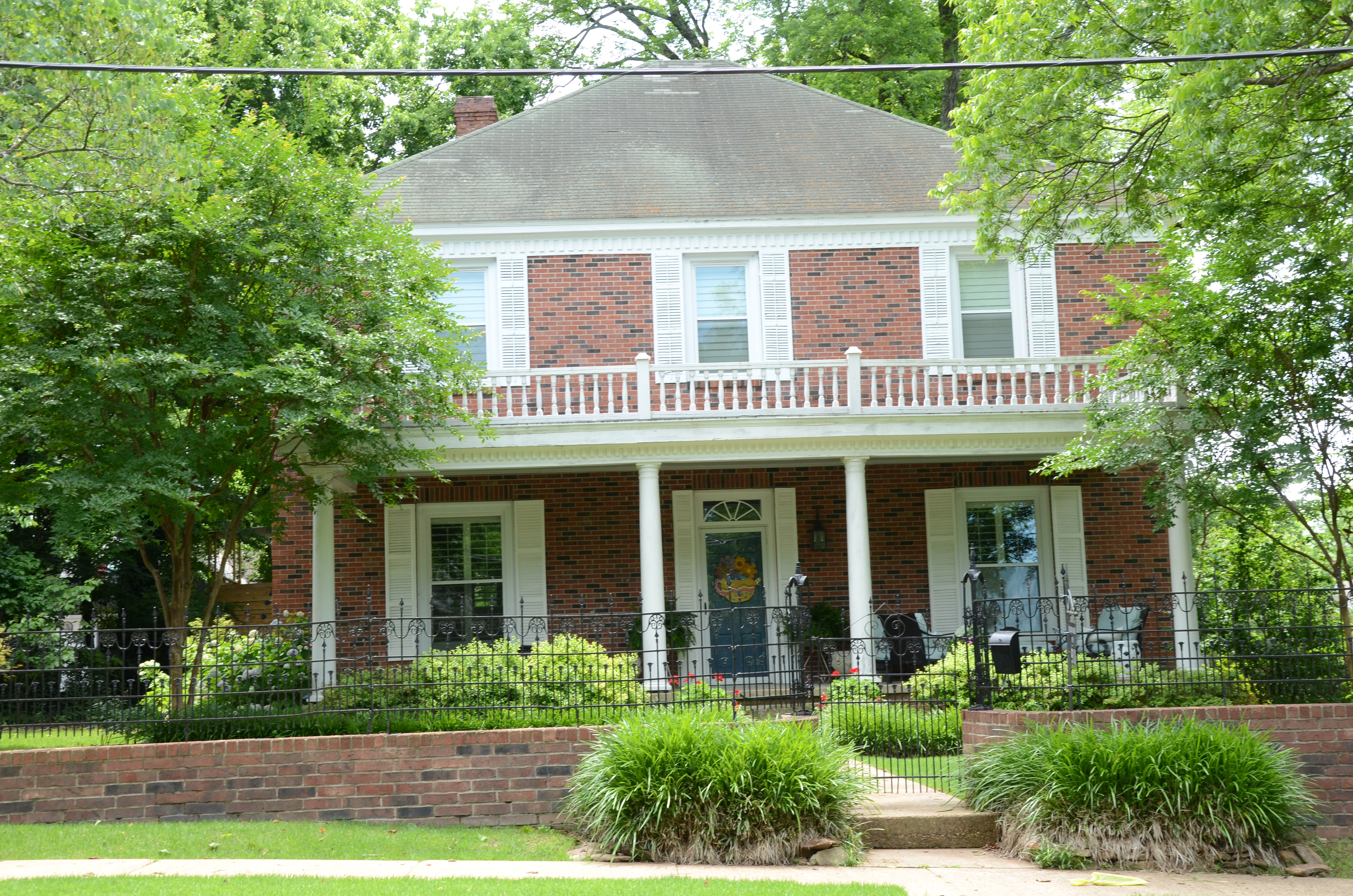

== See also ==
- National Register of Historic Places listings in Independence County, Arkansas
