= Wyatt Petroglyphs =

Archaeological site in Arkansas, United States

- U.S. National Register of Historic Places
- Nearest city: Desha, Arkansas
- Area: 0.1 acres (0.040 ha)
- MPS: Rock Art Sites in Arkansas TR
- NRHP reference No.: 82002116
- Added to NRHP: May 4, 1982

The Wyatt Petroglyphs are rock art located in Independence County, Arkansas, in the general vicinity of the city of Desha. The petroglyphs are of a type commonly found in eastern Missouri and southern Illinois, and are believed to date to about 1500 CE.

Depictions include a thunderbird, bird tracks, arrows, human figures, and crescents and sun rays, all typical of other known regional petroglyph sites. Their relationship to area Native American archaeological sites is not well understood.

The rock art site was listed on the National Register of Historic Places in 1982.

== See also ==
- National Register of Historic Places listings in Independence County, Arkansas
