= Thida Grove School =

- U.S. National Register of Historic Places
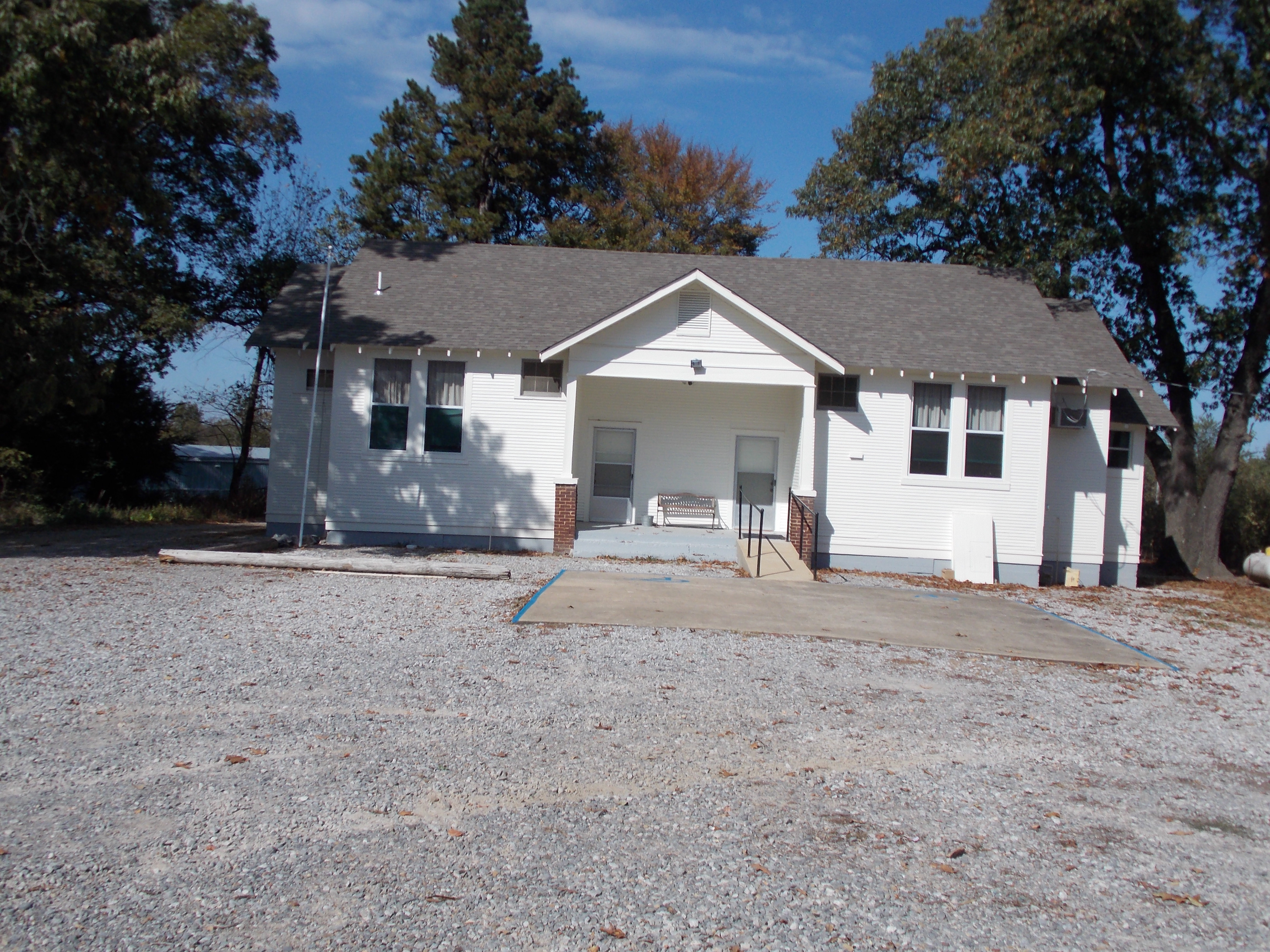

- Location within Arkansas Location within the United States
- Location: Co. Rd. 20, Thida, Arkansas
- Coordinates: 35°34′16″N 91°27′58″W
- Area: less than one acre
- Architectural style: Late 19th And Early 20th Century American Movements, Plain Traditional
- MPS: Public Schools in the Ozarks MPS
- NRHP reference No.: 92001108
- Added to NRHP: September 4, 1992

The Thida Grove School is a historic school building in the rural community of Thida in southern Independence County, Arkansas. Located on the north side of County Road 20, it is a single-story vernacular wood-frame structure, with a side gable roof, weatherboard siding, and a concrete foundation. It has a recessed porch with a pair of entrances. The interior has a single large chamber, with tongue-and-groove wainscoting and wide oak flooring. The school was built about 1920 during a boom period in the region.

The building was listed on the National Register of Historic Places in 1992.

== See also ==
- National Register of Historic Places listings in Independence County, Arkansas
