= List of killings by law enforcement officers in the United States, December 2016 =

This is a list of people reported killed by non-military law enforcement officers in the United States in December 2016, whether in the line of duty or not, and regardless of reason or method. The listing documents the occurrence of a death, making no implications regarding wrongdoing or justification on the part of the person killed or officer involved. Killings are arranged by date of the incident that caused death. Different death dates, if known, are noted in the description. The table below lists 84 people.

== December 2016 ==
| Date | Name (age) of deceased | Race | State (city) | Description |
|---|---|---|---|---|
| 2016-12-31 | Jason Michael Robison (32) | White | Pennsylvania (Juniata) | |
| 2016-12-31 | Chase Tuseth (33) | White | Minnesota (Mankato) | |
| 2016-12-31 | Ricky Kevin Whidden (46) | White | Florida (Loxahatchee) | |
| 2016-12-30 | Jamal Robbins (21) | Black | Florida (Miami) | |
| 2016-12-30 | Daniel Ralph Daily (34) | White | Florida (Pensacola) | |
| 2016-12-30 | Dustin Selby (31) | White | Arizona (Phoenix) | |
| 2016-12-29 | John Sellinger (34) | White | Florida (Land O' Lakes) | |
| 2016-12-29 | James Rich II (52) | Black | Maryland (Chestertown) | |
| 2016-12-28 | Christopher Blake Tucker (28) | White | Tennessee (Spring Hill) | |
| 2016-12-27 | Jake Childers (36) | White | Texas (Falls City) | |
| 2016-12-27 | Alfonso Lopez (41) | Hispanic | Illinois (North Riverside) | |
| 2016-12-27 | Judy Boardman Hundley (71) | White | Texas (Pearland) | |
| 2016-12-27 | Dustin Kirk (35) | White | California (Grass Valley) | |
| 2016-12-27 | Julio Bald Eagle (19) | Native American | South Dakota (Kyle) | |
| 2016-12-25 | Joseph Garcia (33) | Hispanic | Arkansas (Desha) | |
| 2016-12-25 | Michael Alan Altice (61) | White | Florida (Middleburg) | |
| 2016-12-25 | James Tylka (30) | White | Oregon (Sherwood) | |
| 2016-12-25 | Gerald Javon Hall (29) | Black | District of Columbia (Washington) | |
| 2016-12-24 | Miriam Ann Savino (53) | White | Florida (Lake Wales) | |
| 2016-12-24 | Zhonghua Li (48) | Asian | California (Pico Rivera) | |
| 2016-12-24 | Orande Kandie Hayes | Black | Alabama (Gadsden) | |
| 2016-12-23 | Jose Sanchez (34) | Hispanic | California (El Monte) | |
| 2016-12-23 | Michael Tyler Jacques (31) | White | Oregon (Bend) | |
| 2016-12-23 | Jonathan Barrio (35) | Hispanic | California (Trona) | |
| 2016-12-23 | Stanley Eversol (55) | Unknown race | Florida (Palm Harbor) | |
| 2016-12-22 | Terrence Toshay Thomas Jr (19) | Black | Maryland (Capitol Heights) | |
| 2016-12-21 | Benjamin Ortiz (25) | White | Arkansas (Fayetteville) | |
| 2016-12-21 | Raymond James Salaiz (38) | Hispanic | Nevada (Reno) | |
| 2016-12-21 | Ian Shea King (31) | Native American | Oklahoma (Ponca City) | |
| 2016-12-21 | Anthony Lovell Eddington (24) | Black | California (Coalinga) | |
| 2016-12-21 | Colton Dale Calaway (25) | White | Oklahoma (Burns Flat) | |
| 2016-12-21 | William R. Newman (46) | White | Indiana (Knox) | |
| 2016-12-21 | Luis Ambrosio-Aguilar (21) | Hispanic | California (Stockton) | |
| 2016-12-20 | Martin Gomez (46) | Hispanic | Texas (Pharr) | |
| 2016-12-20 | Unnamed person | Unknown race | California (Brawley) | |
| 2016-12-20 | Nick Hamilton (31) | Native American | California (Hemet) | |
| 2016-12-19 | Roy Lee Minton (52) | White | North Carolina (Granite Falls) | |
| 2016-12-18 | Ronald Roy Massengale (72) | White | Oklahoma (Tulsa) | |
| 2016-12-18 | Ryan Devaughn Joseph (20) | Black | California (Los Angeles) | |
| 2016-12-18 | Paul Kolar (37) | White | Washington (Ridgefield) | |
| 2016-12-17 | Chassady LeClair (44) | Native American | Everett, Washington | After threatening to murder his former girlfriend and police over the phone, officers pinged LeClair's location. A struggle ensued when officers reached LeClair's location and he was fatally shot by officers. |
| 2016-12-17 | Jimmy Lee Lawson (48) | White | Tennessee (Arlington) | |
| 2016-12-17 | Fidel Barrios (33) | Hispanic | California (East Los Angeles) | |
| 2016-12-16 | Jeremiah Nels Anderson (36) | White | Oregon (Dallas) | |
| 2016-12-15 | Robert James Hess (60) | White | California (Hacienda Heights) | |
| 2016-12-15 | Marlon Lewis (37) | Black | North Carolina (Badin) | |
| 2016-12-13 | Earl Labon Eubanks Jr. (32) | Black | Georgia (Hampton) | |
| 2016-12-13 | Lavar "Nook" Montray Douglas (18) | Black | Maryland (Baltimore) | |
| 2016-12-12 | Francisco Serna (73) | Hispanic | California (Bakersfield) | A neighbor called police about a suspicious man, Serna, who was possibly armed. Serna was walking with a crucifix in one hand in front of his house when police arrived. Seven officers were on scene, and officer Reagan Selman fired seven rounds at Serna. None of the other officers fired their guns. |
| 2016-12-12 | Rainer Tyler Smith (31) | White | Georgia (Byron) | A man inside a house fired at officers James Wynn and William Patterson, prompting both of them to return fire killing the suspect. |
| 2016-12-12 | Kenneth Robledo (28) | Black | Pennsylvania (Philadelphia) | |
| 2016-12-11 | Amber M. Lewis (44) | White | Arizona (Bullhead City) | |
| 2016-12-11 | Timothy Case (53) | White | Nebraska (York) | |
| 2016-12-11 | Jose Angel Vallarta (30) | Hispanic | Texas (Laredo) | |
| 2016-12-11 | Gary Leon Herd Jr. (24) | White | Kansas (Medicine Lodge) | |
| 2016-12-11 | Randy Lee Cumberledge (39) | White | West Virginia (Fairmont) | |
| 2016-12-10 | Samson G. Varner (36) | White | Indiana (Greenwood) | |
| 2016-12-10 | Waltki Cermoun Williams (35) | Black | South Carolina (Sumter) | |
| 2016-12-09 | Scott MacIntosh (35) | White | Pennsylvania (Easton) | |
| 2016-12-09 | David Scott Winkler (44) | White | Tennessee (Madisonville) | |
| 2016-12-09 | Stephen Joshua Whitney (30) | Native Hawaiian or Pacific Islander | Hawaii (Keaau) | |
| 2016-12-09 | Brent Quinn (43) | White | North Carolina (Leland) | |
| 2016-12-08 | Robert Wilburn Head | White | Texas (Allen) | |
| 2016-12-07 | Keelan Charles Murray (37) | White | Texas (Dallas) | |
| 2016-12-07 | Daniel Anthony Riedmann (36) | White | Iowa (Sioux City) | |
| 2016-12-07 | Mark Anthony Hicks (31) | Black | North Carolina (Fayetteville) | |
| 2016-12-07 | Redrick "Red" Jevon Batiste (37) | Black | Texas (Houston) | |
| 2016-12-07 | Steven Garrett Ward (20) | White | Pennsylvania (Avella) | |
| 2016-12-06 | Wayne Donald Dorsey (49) | White | Florida (Fruitland Park) | |
| 2016-12-06 | Westley Daum (47) | White | Florida (Orange City) | |
| 2016-12-06 | Richard R. Jones (55) | White | Kansas (Hutchinson) | |
| 2016-12-06 | Steven Wayne Liffel (52) | White | Oregon (Portland) | |
| 2016-12-04 | James Dean Smith (33) | White | Utah (American Fork) | |
| 2016-12-04 | Saif Nasser Mubarak Alameri (26) | Asian/Middle Eastern | Ohio (Hudson) | A man was shot and killed by a Hudson Police officer during a struggle after he crashed his car and fled into a wooded area. |
| 2016-12-04 | Norman Gary (29) | Black | Indiana (Elkhart) | Gary was shot and killed by two Elkhart Police officers while inside a vehicle with another person who was also shot by officers but not killed. Police say that the officers exchanged gunfire with the people in the vehicle. Officers had been investigating a burglary in the area when they heard gunfire and encountered the vehicle. |
| 2016-12-03 | Isreal Flores (38) | Hispanic | Louisiana (Metairie) | Flores was shot and killed by a Jefferson Parish SWAT unit after he allegedly refused to lower his weapon. Police say Flores had exchanged gunfire with Jefferson Parish Sheriff's deputy Nicholas Songy (both were struck by gunfire), who was responding to a domestic disturbance call. |
| 2016-12-02 | Josh Dunne (36) | White | New Mexico (Las Cruces) | Dunne was shot and killed by officers after he allegedly barricaded himself in a hotel room. Police found Dunne's car at the hotel after a relative told police he was suicidal and possibly armed. Police say that Dunne was uncooperative with officers and with SWAT and Hostage Negotiation teams. |
| 2016-12-02 | Joseph Edward Turner Jr. (58) | White | Arkansas (Benton) | |
| 2016-12-02 | Paul Mebane (28) | Black | Florida (Brandon) | |
| 2016-12-02 | Derek Lynn Scott (33) | White | Alabama (Tuscumbia) | Scott was shot and killed by police after he allegedly pulled out a gun and fired a shot while being patted down by officers. |
| 2016-12-02 | Dylan M. Dalzell (22) | White | Kentucky (Simpsonville) | Dalzell was shot and killed by a Shelby County deputy after allegedly being told to drop the crowbar he was carrying. Police were responding to a suspected break-in at a church. |
| 2016-12-01 | Quinton Phillips (83) | White | Arkansas (Dover) | Phillips was shot and killed by officers after he allegedly shot at them with a rifle. Officers were responding to a report of an armed disturbance at a home. |
| 2016-12-01 | Jose Noe Barron Gomez (27) | Hispanic | Arizona (Tucson) | Gomez was shot and killed during an exchange of gunfire with Tucson Police officers Jorge Tequida and Doug Wilfert, who were attempting to serve an arrest warrant to Gomez. Both officers were injured by gunfire. |
| 2016-12-01 | Bruce Randall Johnson II (38) | Black | Washington (Tacoma) | Johnson was shot through a window and killed by a Pierce County sheriff's deputy after a 12-hour standoff with police. Officers were originally responding to a call of an injured dog when they say they found Johnson's wife locked out of their home. When the officers entered the home, police say Johnson shot Tacoma police Officer Reginald Gutierrez multiple times. The officer later died. |
