= Pfeiffer House (Pfeiffer, Arkansas) =

Historic house in Arkansas, United States

- U.S. National Register of Historic Places
- Location: US 167, Pfeiffer, Arkansas
- Area: 17.5 acres (7.1 ha)
- Built: 1924
- Built by: Joseph A. Pfeiffer
- Architectural style: Bungalow/American Craftsman
- NRHP reference No.: 89000172
- Added to NRHP: May 1, 1989

The Pfeiffer House is a historic house on United States Route 167 in Pfeiffer, Arkansas. Located on the west side the highway, north of its junction with Pfeiffer Road, it is a single-story stone structure with an extreme vernacular interpretation of American Craftsman styling. It has a hip roof with long eaves, supported by a series of elongated knee braces, and its corners and windows are irregularly quoined with lighter-colored Batesville "marble" (actually limestone), which constitutes the building's principal building material. The house was built in 1924 by Joseph Pfeiffer, a stonecutter and owner of the Pfeiffer Quarry, which provided the stone for the Arkansas State Capitol and is credited for doing some of that building's elaborate stonework.

The house was listed on the National Register of Historic Places in 1989.

== See also ==
- National Register of Historic Places listings in Independence County, Arkansas
