= Franklin Desha House =

Historic house in Arkansas, United States

- U.S. National Register of Historic Places
- Location: Address Restricted, Desha, Arkansas
- Area: 1 acre (0.40 ha)
- Built: 1847
- Architectural style: Double-pen dogtrot house
- NRHP reference No.: 86002844
- Added to NRHP: October 9, 1986

The Franklin Desha House is a historic house in Desha, Arkansas. It is a single-story double-pen dogtrot house, with a side gable roof and a projecting gabled roof at the center of its main facade. Built in 1847, the house is important for as one of the older houses in Independence County, and for its association with the Desha and Searcy families, both important to the history of Arkansas. Franklin Desha was the son of Robert Desha, who settled Helena, and nephew of Benjamin Desha, for whom Desha County is named. He married Elizabeth Searcy, the daughter of Richard Searcy, a lawyer and judge for whom Searcy and Searcy County are named. Desha, a veteran of the Mexican–American War, built this house in 1847, and served in the Confederate Army during the American Civil War. This property was the site of a Confederate encampment in 1863.

The house was listed on the National Register of Historic Places in 1986.

== See also ==
- National Register of Historic Places listings in Independence County, Arkansas
