= Wyatt House (Desha, Arkansas) =

Historic house in Arkansas, United States

- U.S. National Register of Historic Places
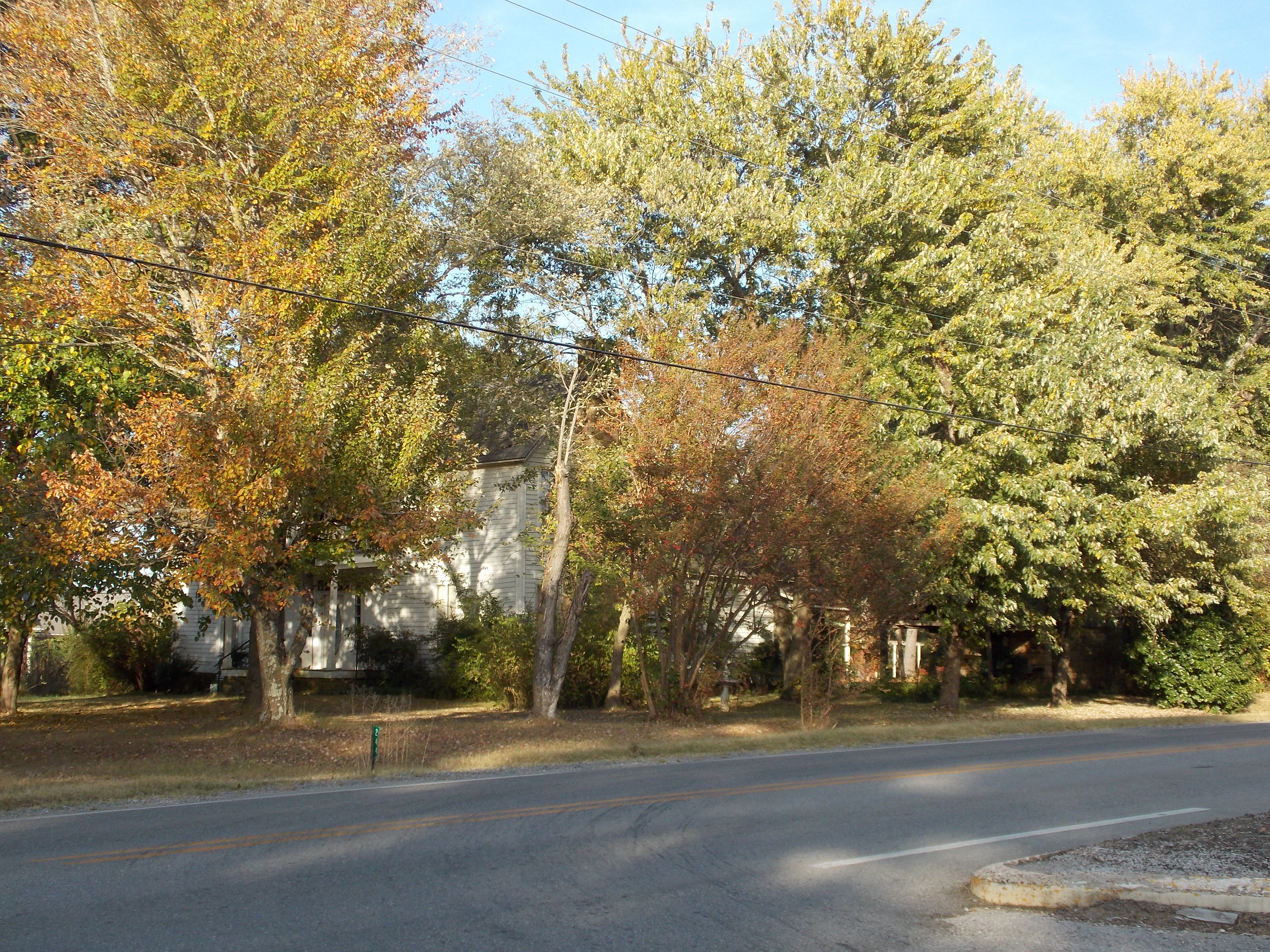

- Location within Arkansas Location within the United States
- Location: Jct. AR 25 and Gainer Ferry Rd., Desha, Arkansas
- Coordinates: 35°44′13″N 91°40′31″W
- Area: 1 acre (0.40 ha)
- Built: 1870
- Architectural style: I-house
- NRHP reference No.: 99000263
- Added to NRHP: March 5, 1999

The Wyatt House is a historic house at Gainer Ferry Road and Arkansas Highway 25 in Desha, Arkansas. It is a two-story I-house, three bays wide, with a side gable roof, end chimneys, and a single-story ell extending to the rear. The oldest portion of the house, its first floor, was built about 1870 as a dogtrot. In about 1900, the breezeway of the dogtrot was enclosed, and the second story and ell were added. The property also includes a stone wellhouse dating to the enlargement. The house was built by Samuel Wyatt, a veteran of the American Civil War.

The house was listed on the National Register of Historic Places in 1999.

== See also ==
- National Register of Historic Places listings in Independence County, Arkansas
