= School Addition Historic District =

Historic district in Arkansas, United States

- U.S. National Register of Historic Places
- U.S. Historic district
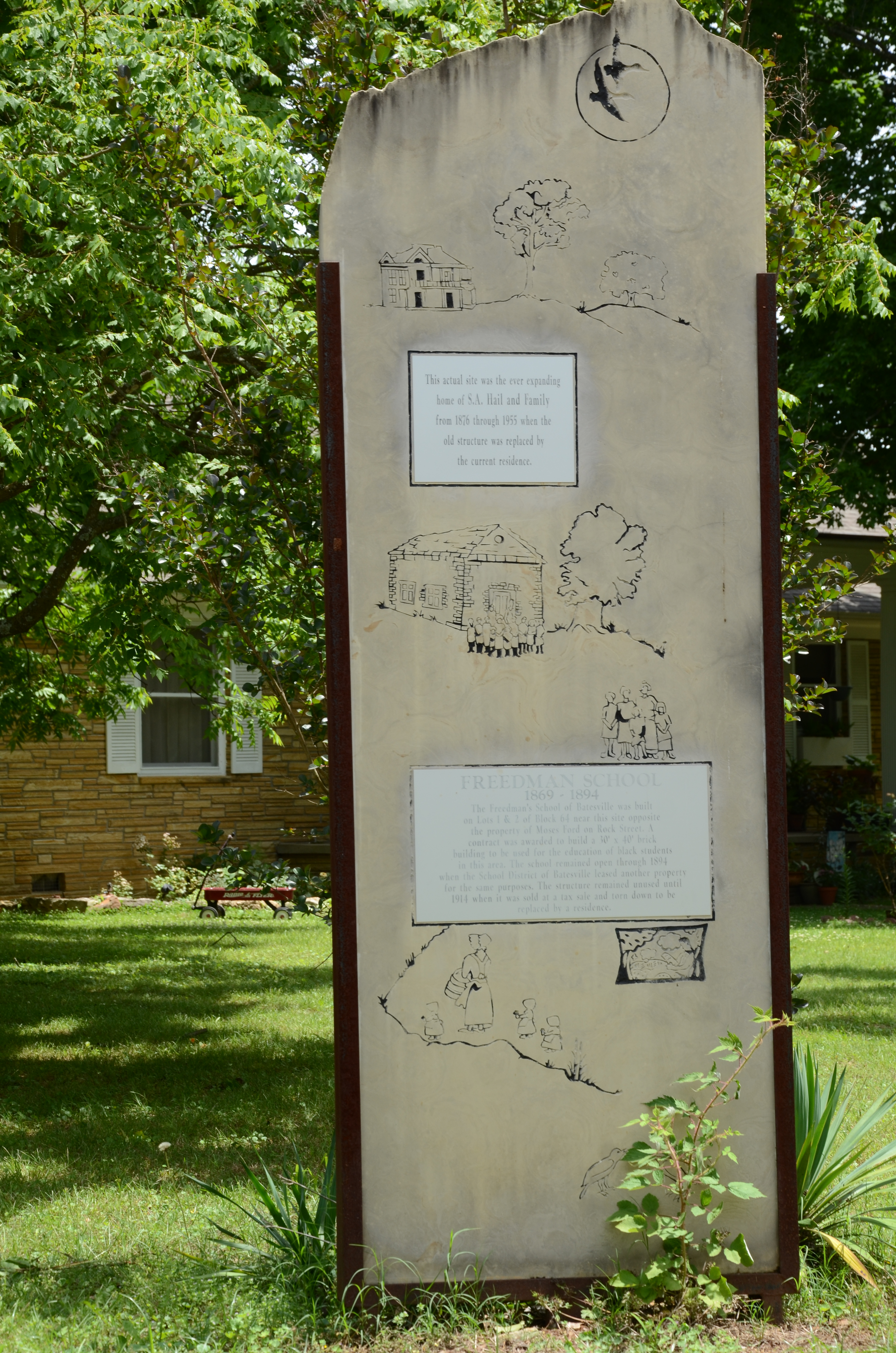

- Location within Arkansas Location within the United States
- Location: 560–770 Water, 210–293 N. 7th, 709–897 Rock, 215–280 N. 8th, Batesville, Arkansas
- Coordinates: 35°46′28″N 91°38′56″W
- Area: 10 acres (4.0 ha)
- Built: 1850
- Architect: Wyssel & Fitzhugh; et.al.
- Architectural style: Bungalow/American craftsman, Queen Anne
- NRHP reference No.: 06001315
- Added to NRHP: February 1, 2007

The School Addition Historic District encompasses a middle-class residential area of Batesville, Arkansas that typifies its growth between about 1850 and 1950. It is located between Main Street and Poke Bayou, along two blocks each of Rock and Water Streets (offset to give the district the shape of a parallelogram), and the intervening blocks of 7th and 8th Streets. Houses in this area are generally of a modest scale, built for tradesmen and craftsmen. They come in a variety of styles, including the traditional I-house, American Craftsman-style bungalows, and ranches. The district was platted out in 1849 and sold off by the town to raise funds for public education.

The district was listed on the National Register of Historic Places in 2007. It includes two previously-listed properties: the Glenn House, and the Wycough–Jones House.

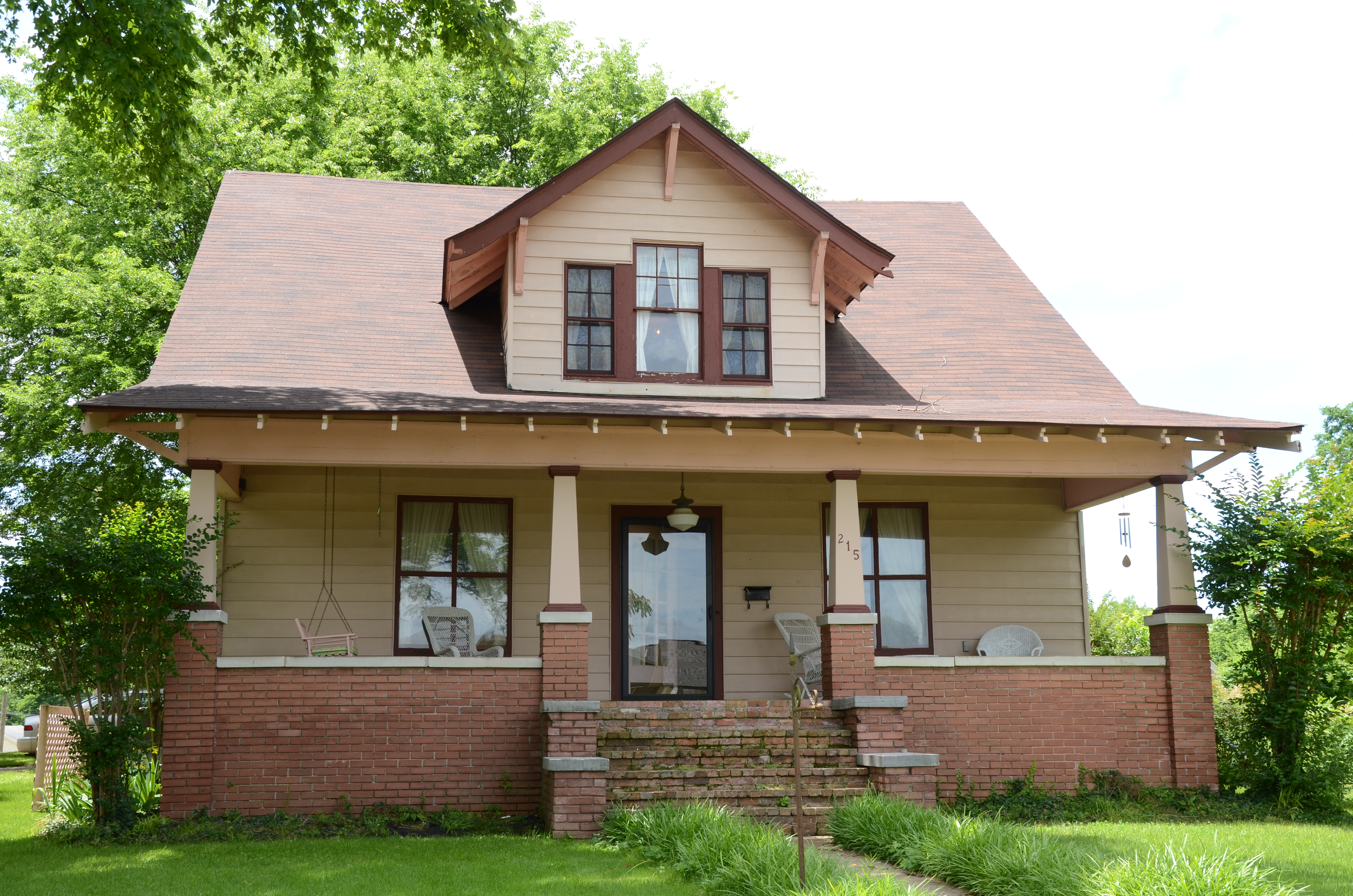

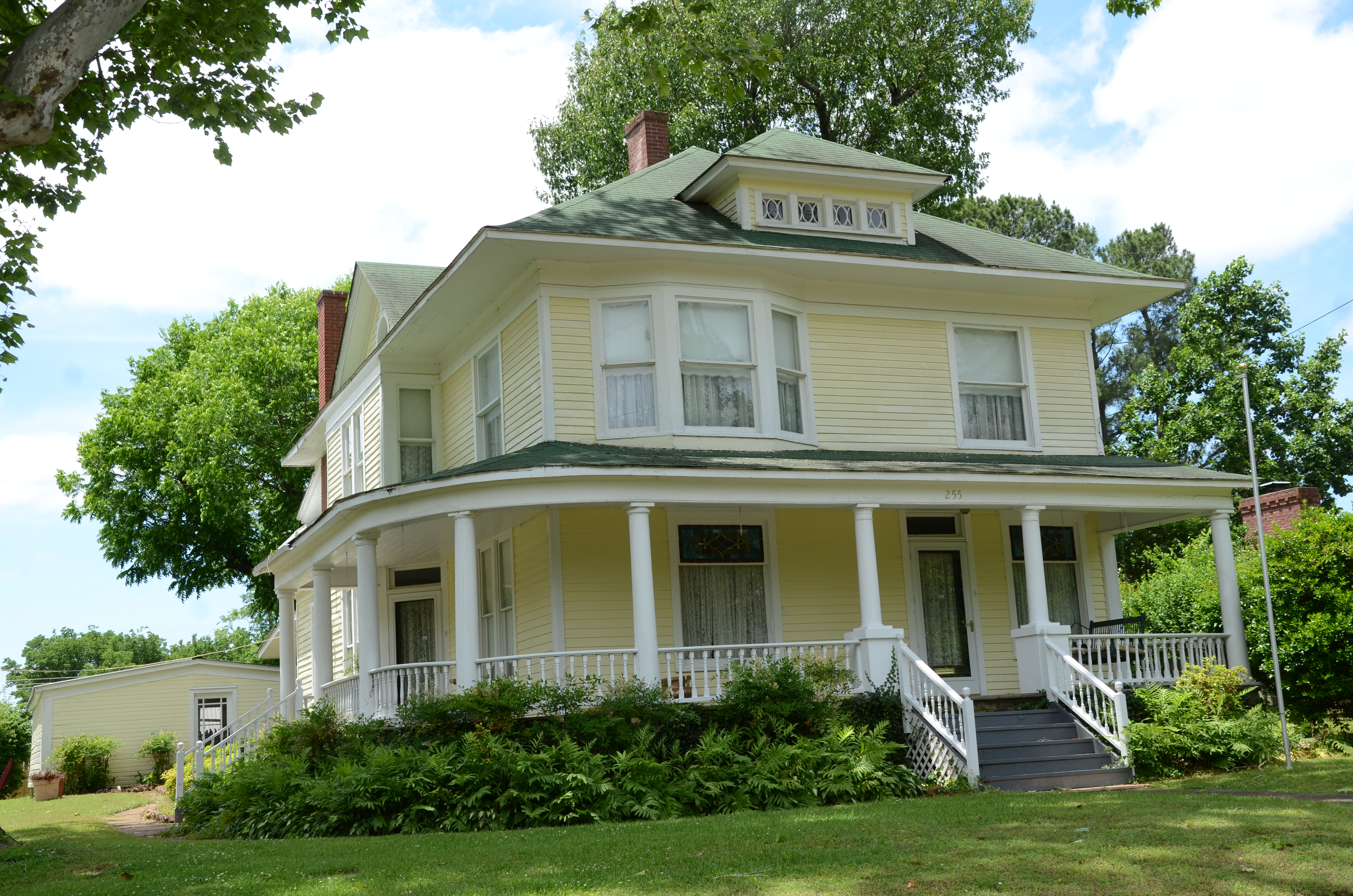

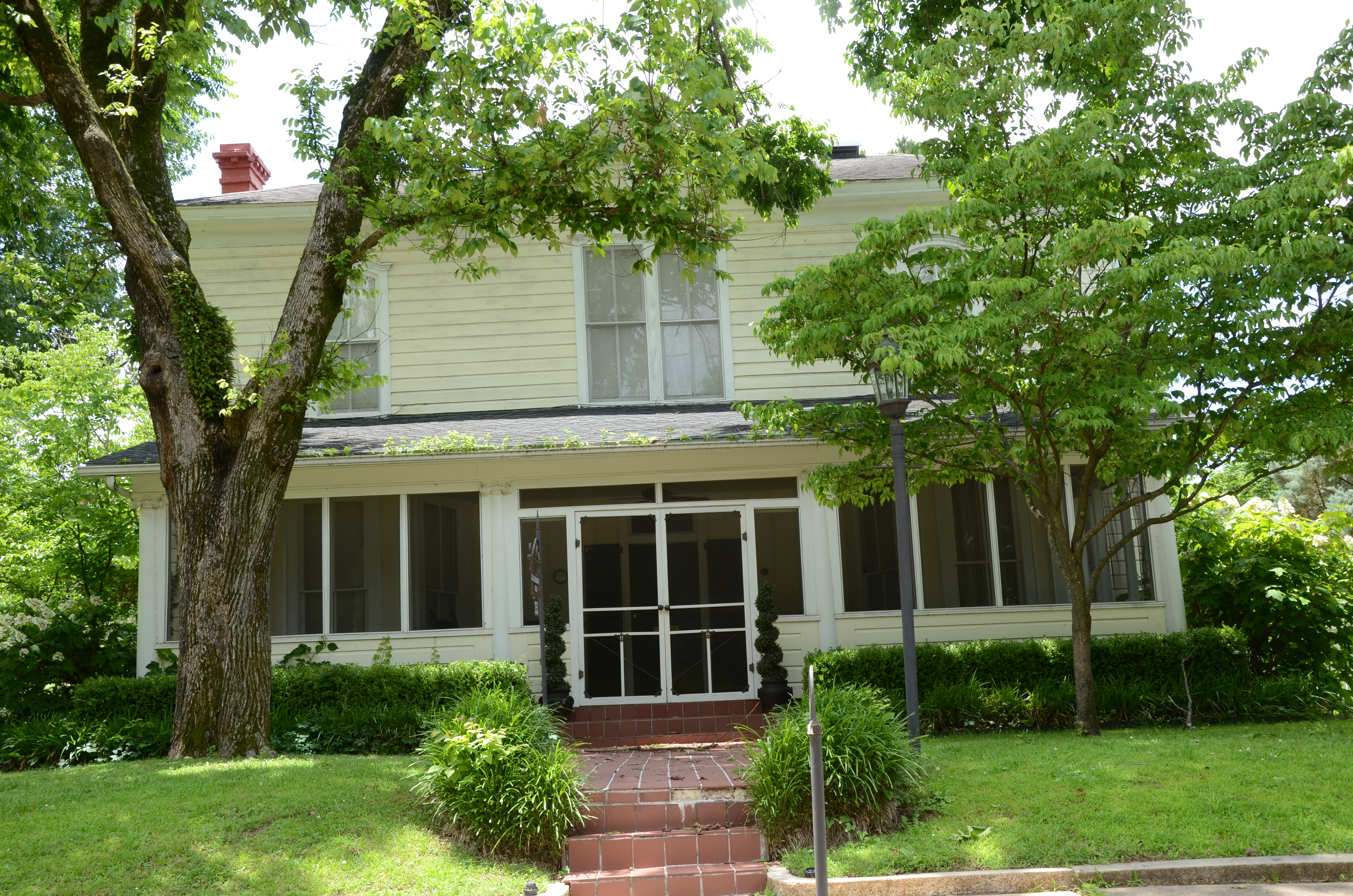

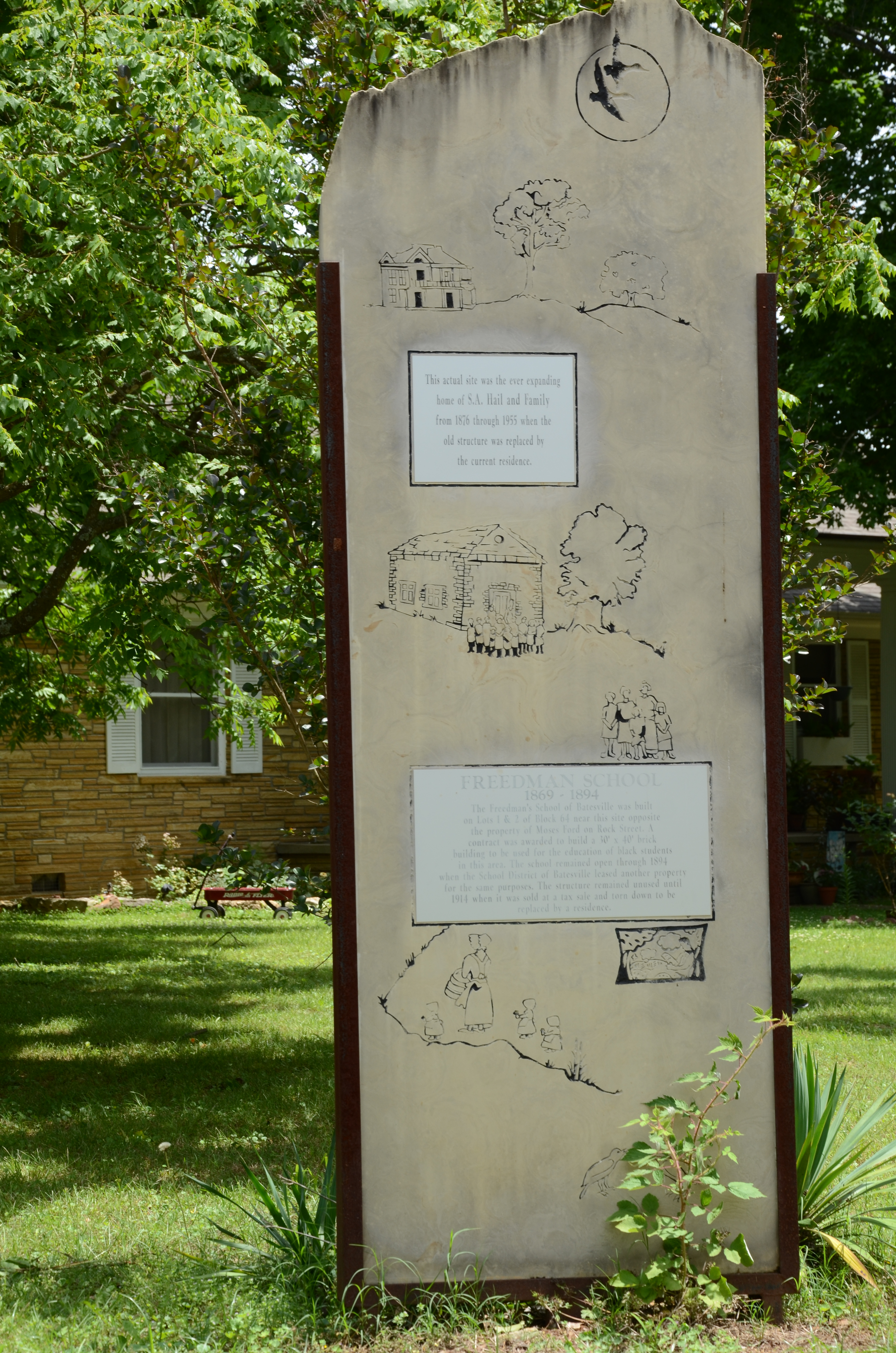

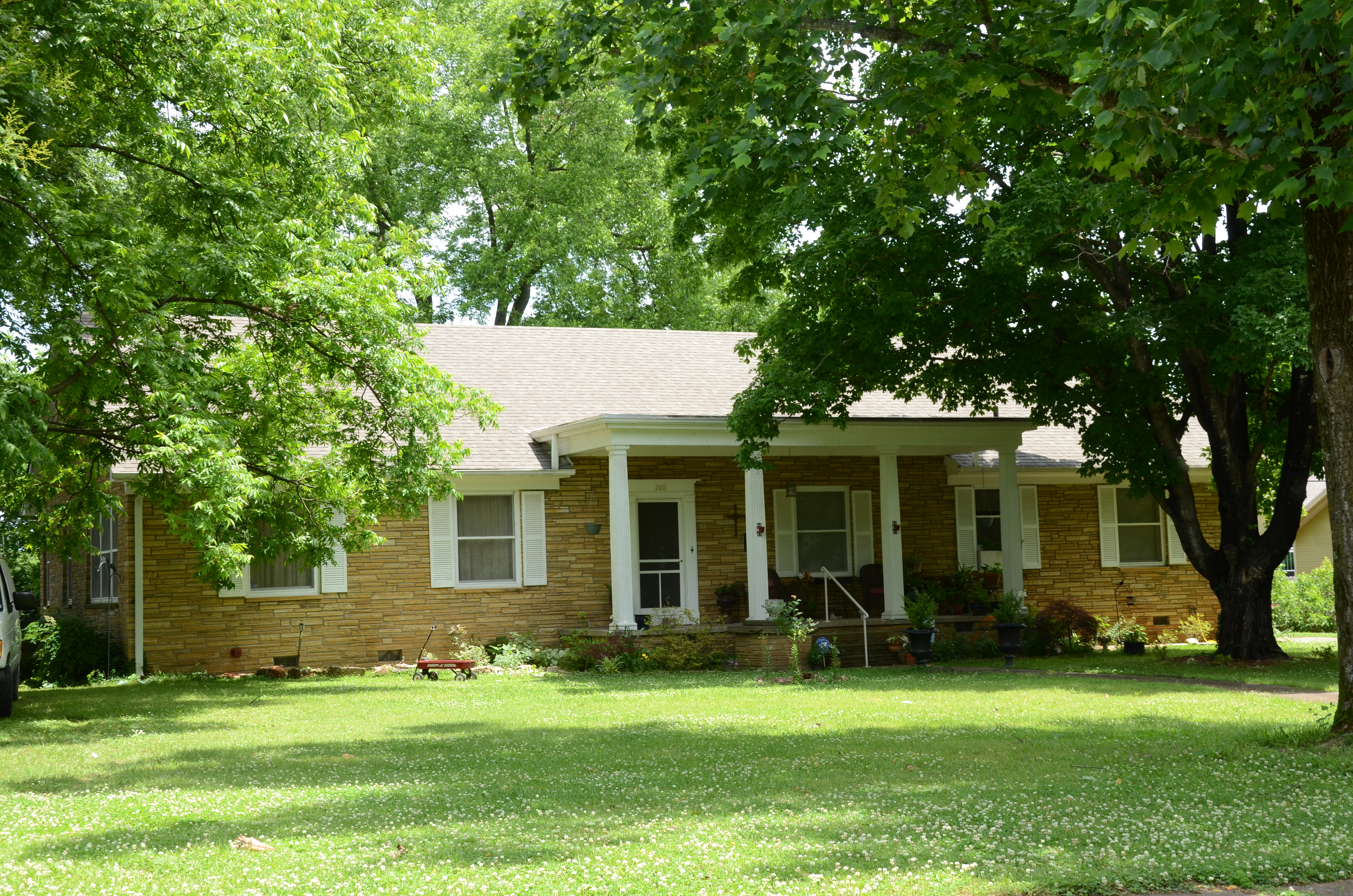

== See also ==
- National Register of Historic Places listings in Independence County, Arkansas
