= St. Paul's Parish Church (Batesville, Arkansas) =

Historic church in Arkansas, United States

- U.S. National Register of Historic Places
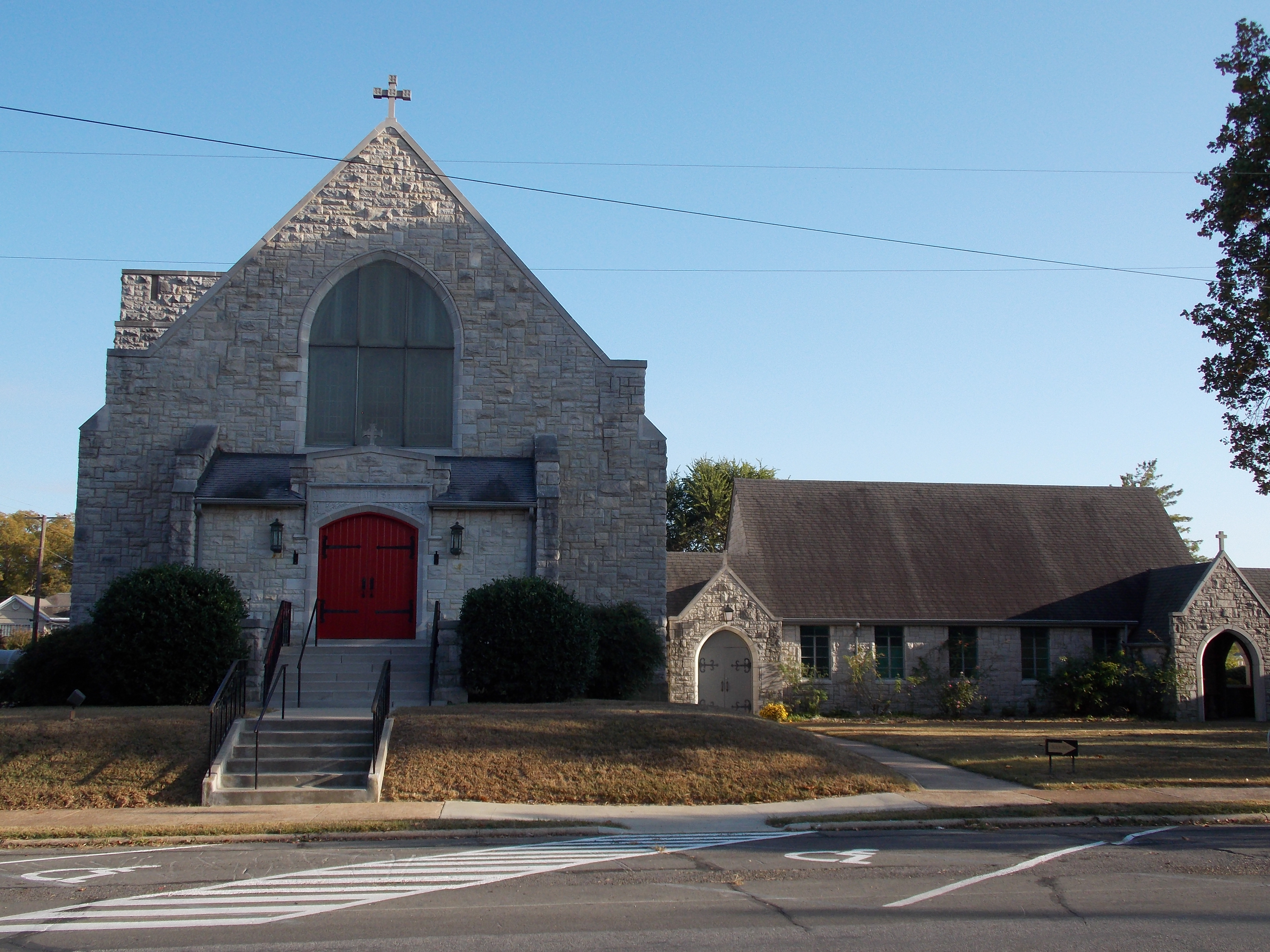

- Location within Arkansas Location within the United States
- Location: 5th and Main, Batesville, Arkansas
- Coordinates: 35°46′19″N 91°39′0″W
- Area: less than one acre
- Built: 1916
- Architect: Thompson, Charles L.
- Architectural style: Late Gothic Revival
- MPS: Thompson, Charles L., Design Collection TR
- NRHP reference No.: 82000836
- Added to NRHP: December 22, 1982

St. Paul's Parish is a congregation of the Episcopal Church in Batesville, Arkansas. The parish was officially founded on March 3, 1866, by Bishop Henry C. Lay and the Rev. Charles H. Albert, who had been working as missionaries in the area since the previous year. It is part of the Episcopal Diocese of Arkansas.

In 2015, the church reported 270 members; in 2023, it reported 144 members. No membership statistics were reported in 2024 national parochial reports. Plate and pledge financial support reported by the church in 2024 was $228,921. Average Sunday Attendance (ASA) reported in 2024 was 51 persons. This was a relative decrease from ASA of 127 persons reported in 2015.

== Building ==
Its historic parish church is located at 424 East Main Street. Designed by noted Arkansas architect Charles L. Thompson, it was built in 1916 to replace the original 1869 structure. Its main block is a cruciform stone structure with Gothic Revival styling, and a squat square tower located at the inside corner of the nave and eastern transept. The main entrance is set at the northern end of the nave, in a segmented-arch opening set in a low projecting section. The gable end above the entrance has a large Gothic-arched stained glass window. The building was listed on the National Register of Historic Places in 1982.

== See also ==
- National Register of Historic Places listings in Independence County, Arkansas
