= Jamestown School =

- U.S. National Register of Historic Places
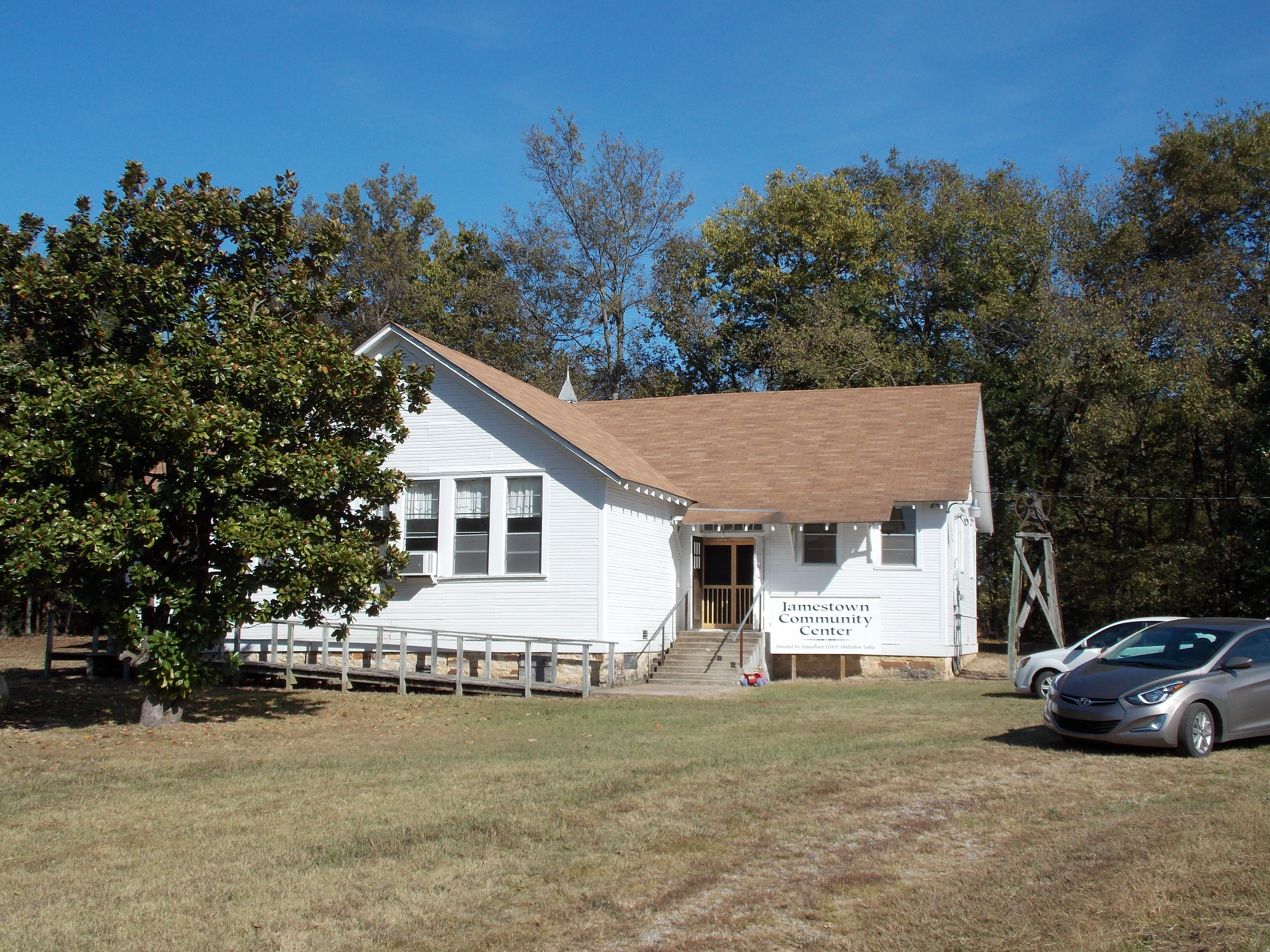

- Location within Arkansas Location within the United States
- Location: N of AR 230, Jamestown, Arkansas
- Coordinates: 35°41′50″N 91°42′13″W
- Area: less than one acre
- Built by: Mac Steward
- Architectural style: Bungalow/American Craftsman
- MPS: Public Schools in the Ozarks MPS
- NRHP reference No.: 92001106
- Added to NRHP: September 4, 1992

The Jamestown School is a historic school building in rural central western Independence County, Arkansas. It is located in the hamlet of Jamestown, just north of Arkansas Highway 230 at the junction of Race Street and Snapp Lane. It is a single-story wood-frame structure, with a T-shaped plan, cross-gable roof, novelty siding, and stone foundation. It is stylistically Craftsman, mostly in plan and layout of windows. It was built in 1926, and was used as a county school until 1949.

The building was listed on the National Register of Historic Places in 1992.

== See also ==
- National Register of Historic Places listings in Independence County, Arkansas
