= Garrott House =

Historic house in Arkansas, United States

- U.S. National Register of Historic Places
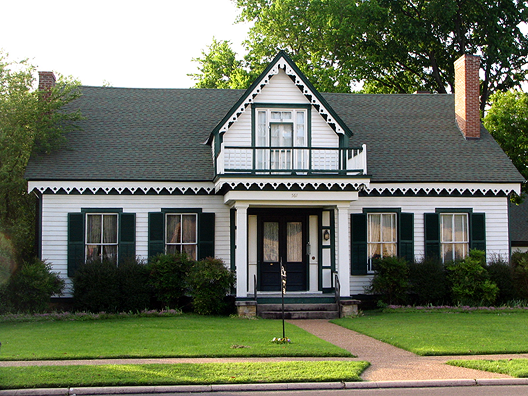
- The Garrott House in 2006

- Location within Arkansas Location within the United States
- Location: Batesville, Arkansas
- Coordinates: 35.7728°N 91.6498°W
- Built: 1842
- Architect: George Case
- NRHP reference No.: 71000125
- Added to NRHP: June 24, 1971

The Garrott House is a historic house in Batesville, Arkansas, located at the corner of Sixth and Main Streets. Built in 1842, it is the oldest standing house in the Batesville area.

== History ==
Built in 1842 by George Case for his wife's sister and husband, Robert and Eliza Ridgway Williams, this was the first structure in Batesville to be placed on the National Register of Historic Places. When Robert Williams' widow emigrated to California in 1853, Case took possession of the house, and later deeded it to his daughter, Mary Catherine Case Maxfield, who owned the house until her death in 1940. The Rev. and Mrs. E.P.J. Garrott, daughter and son-in-law of the Maxfields, then lived in the house until the mid-1960s. It has been restored by the current owners and residents.

== Structure ==
A story-and-a-half Georgian, the house is five bays wide, with a side gable roof and five chimneys. A porch extends in front of the centered entrance, supported by fluted wooden columns, with a projecting gable section above. The house has two large rooms on each side of a central hall downstairs, each room containing a fireplace. Its 1840s features include braced-frame construction, random width heart pine flooring, original pegged doors and mantel, and original woodwork. Late Victorian features are the stone kitchen in the rear, an 1880s addition, as well as the central dormer, the two-over-two front windows, the fretwork around the eaves, and cast-iron faux marble mantels on the west side, where the 1880s flues have replaced the 1840s fireplaces.

== See also ==
- National Register of Historic Places listings in Independence County, Arkansas
