= Ruddell Mill Site =

Archaeological site in Arkansas, United States

- U.S. National Register of Historic Places
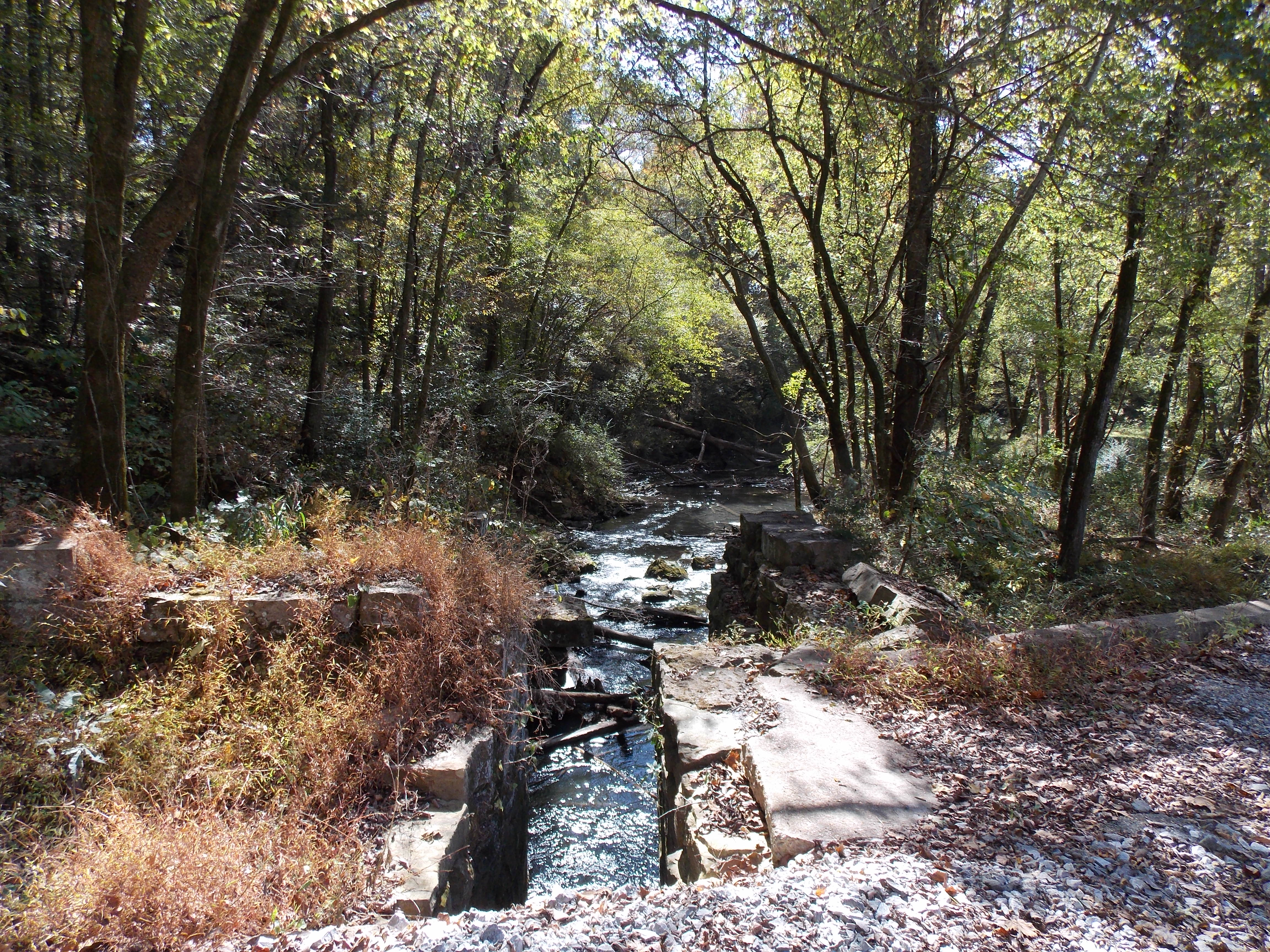

- Location within Arkansas Location within the United States
- Nearest city: Batesville, Arkansas
- Coordinates: 35.7726°N 91.7000°W
- Area: 4 acres (1.6 ha)
- Built: 1830
- NRHP reference No.: 07000434
- Added to NRHP: August 28, 2007

The Ruddell Mill Site is a historic early industrial site near Batesville, Arkansas. It is the site of a mill established by John Ruddell, one of the early settlers of Independence County who established several mills on the creeks and streams that traversed the area north of the White River. The mill was operated by the Ruddells until 1917, and the main building was destroyed by fire in the 1930s. Surviving elements include a stone foundation, mill dam, and a low-water bridge built over the dam in the early 20th century.

The site was listed on the National Register of Historic Places in 2007.

== See also ==
- National Register of Historic Places listings in Independence County, Arkansas
