= Bartlett-Kirk House =

Historic house in Arkansas, United States

- Bartlett--Kirk House
- U.S. National Register of Historic Places
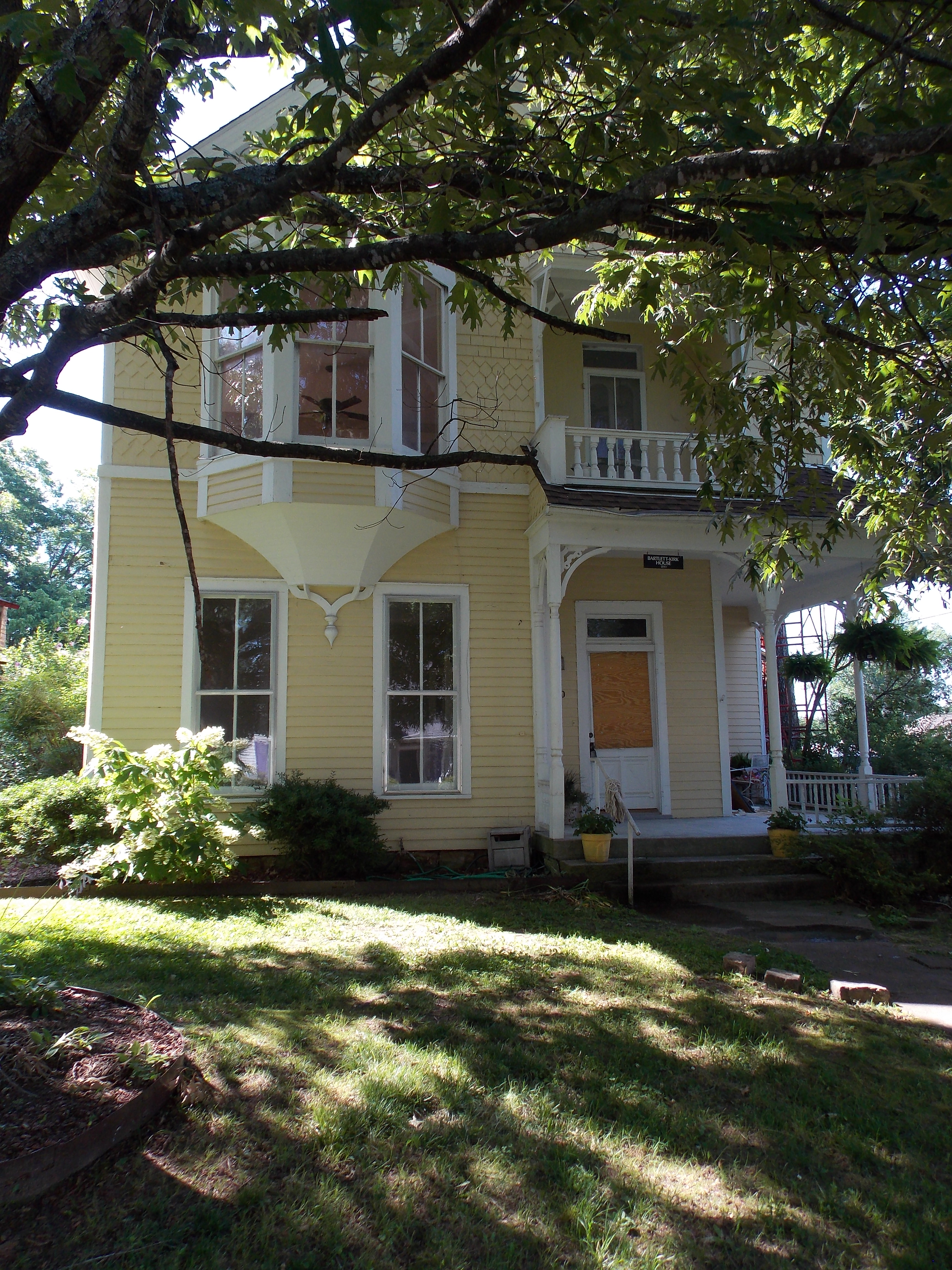

- Location within Arkansas Location within the United States
- Location: 910 College St. Batesville, Arkansas
- Coordinates: 35°46′25″N 91°38′41″W
- Area: less than one acre
- Built: 1890
- Architectural style: Queen Anne
- NRHP reference No.: 94000856
- Added to NRHP: August 16, 1994

The Bartlett-Kirk House is a historic house at 910 College Street in Batesville, Arkansas. It is a 2 1/2-story wood-frame structure, with the asymmetrical massing typical of the Queen Anne style. It is finished with wooden clapboards and a variety of cut shingles, including alternating bands of diamond and square-cut shingles on the upper levels of the front gable end. The entrance porch is decorated with spindlework frieze and a low balustrade, and is supported by turned posts. Built in 1890, it is one of the city's finest examples of Queen Anne architecture.

The house was listed on the National Register of Historic Places in 1994.

== See also ==
- National Register of Historic Places listings in Independence County, Arkansas
