= Edward Dickinson House =

Historic house in Arkansas, United States

- U.S. National Register of Historic Places
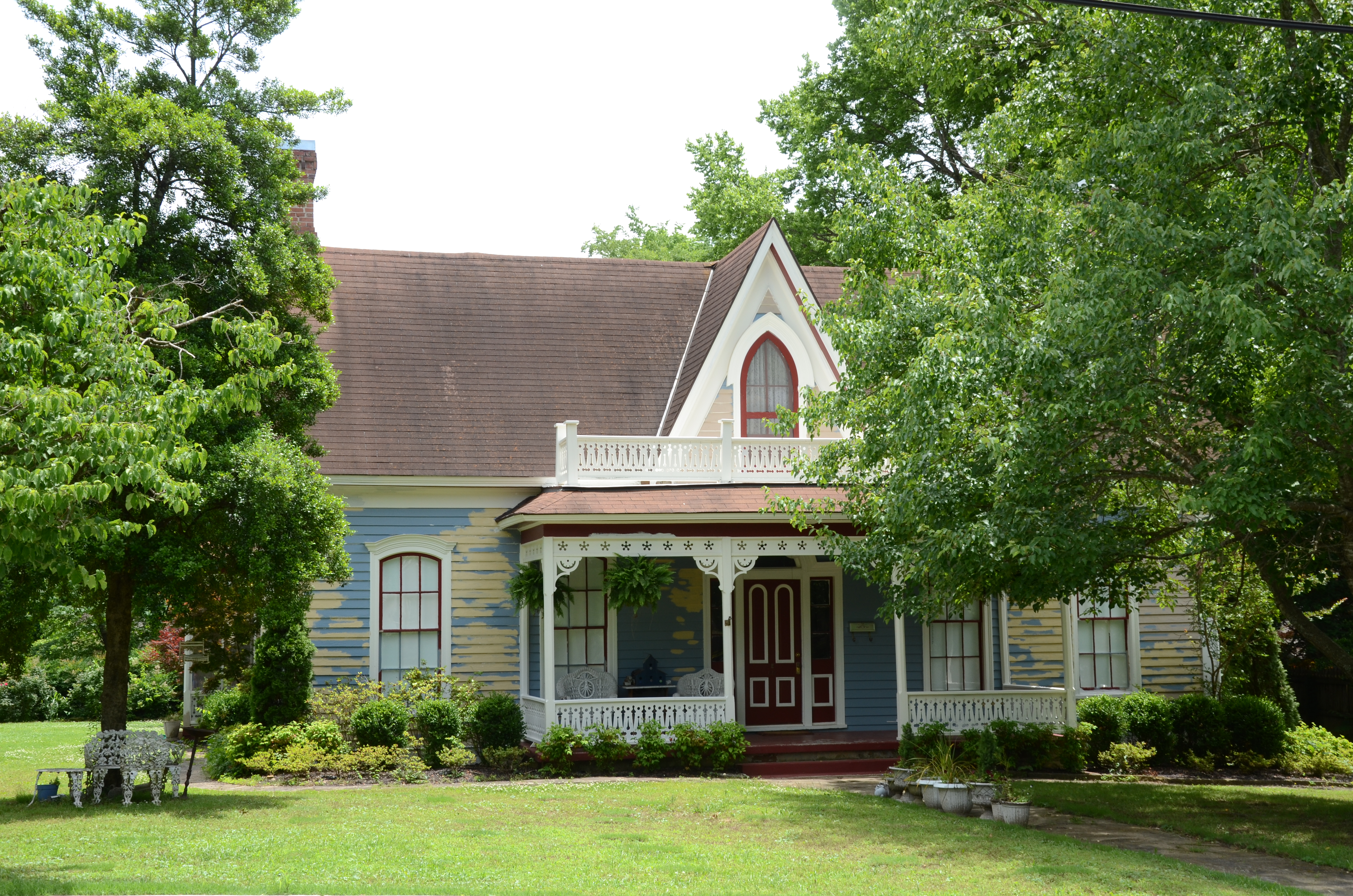

- Location within Arkansas Location within the United States
- Location: 672 E. Boswell St., Batesville, Arkansas
- Coordinates: 35°46′17″N 91°38′48″W
- Area: less than one acre
- Built: 1875
- Architectural style: Gothic
- NRHP reference No.: 86002907
- Added to NRHP: November 26, 1986

The Edward Dickinson House is a historic house at 672 East Boswell Street in Batesville, Arkansas. It is a 1 1/2-story wood-frame structure, with a steeply pitched gable roof and Gothic Revival styling. A front-facing gable is centered on the main facade, with a Gothic-arched window at its center. The single-story porch extending across the front is supported by chamfered posts and has a jigsawn balustrade. Built about 1875, it is one of the city's few surviving 19th-century Gothic houses, a style that is somewhat rare in the state.

The house was listed on the National Register of Historic Places in 1986.

== See also ==
- National Register of Historic Places listings in Independence County, Arkansas
