= Dondy Building =

- U.S. National Register of Historic Places
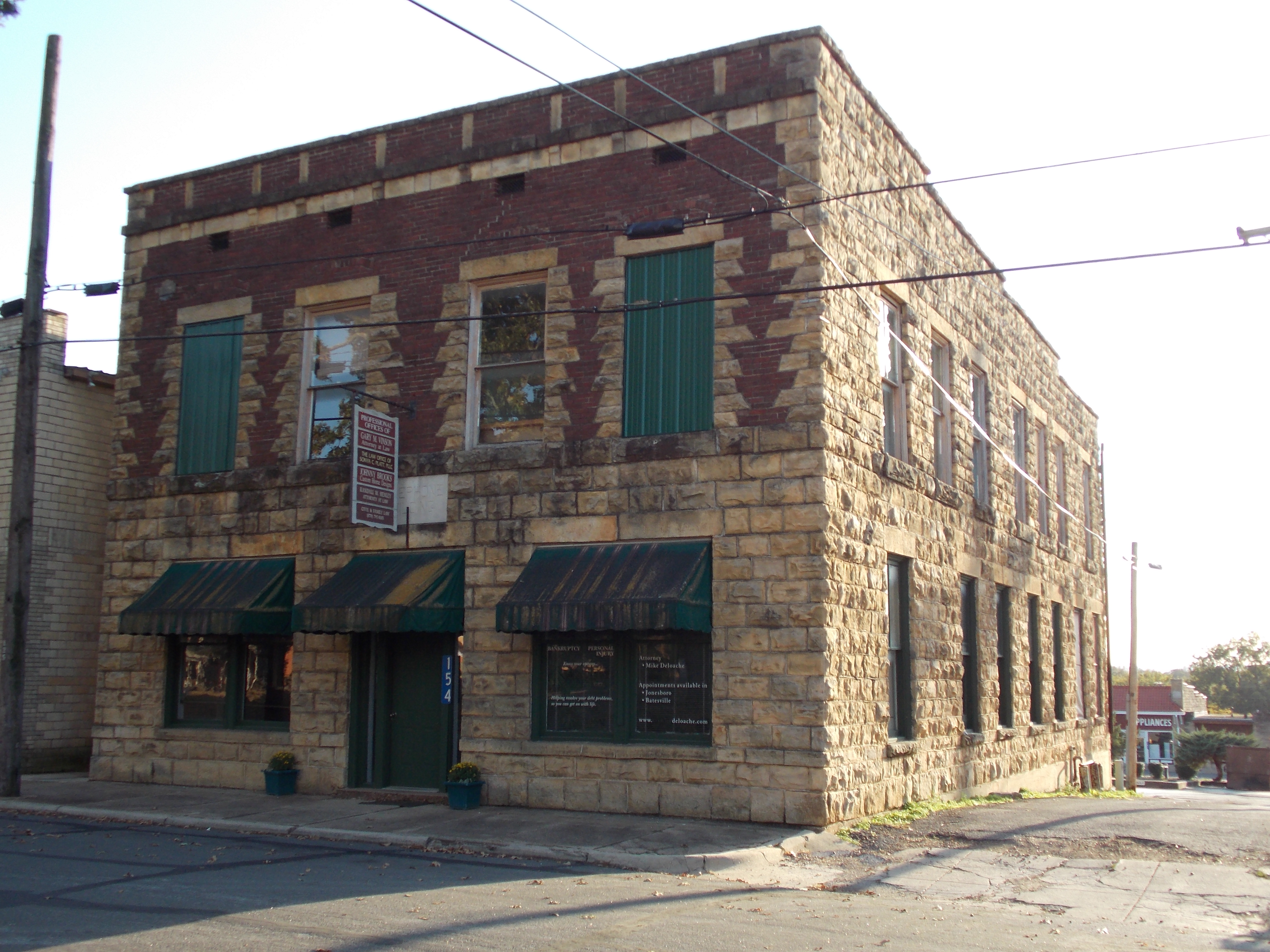

- Location within Arkansas Location within the United States
- Location: 154 S. Third, Batesville, Arkansas
- Coordinates: 35°46′14″N 91°39′6″W
- Area: less than one acre
- Built: 1918
- Architect: Sanders, Theodore Sanders
- MPS: Thompson, Charles L., Design Collection TR
- NRHP reference No.: 82000824
- Added to NRHP: December 22, 1982

The Dondy Building was a historic commercial building at 154 South 3rd Street in Batesville, Arkansas. It is a two-story masonry structure, built out of rusticated sandstone in a typical regional style. A portion of the second story was faced in red brick, providing contrast to the lighter sandstone trim elements at the corners and window surrounds. The windows had quoined sides and smooth stone lintels, and there was a band of smooth stone just below the flat roof. The building was designed by Theodore Sanders and built in 1918.

The building was listed on the National Register of Historic Places in 1982. It was demolished sometime before January 2019.

== See also ==
- National Register of Historic Places listings in Independence County, Arkansas
