= Captain John T. Warner House =

Historic house in Arkansas, United States

- Capt. John T. Warner House
- U.S. National Register of Historic Places
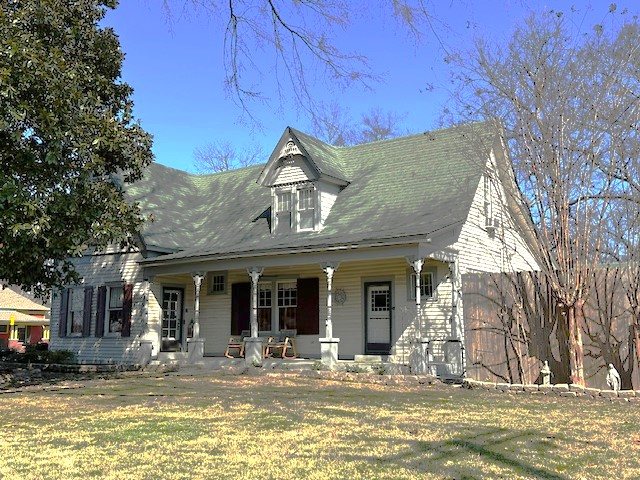
- The Captain John T. Warner House in Batesville Ark., February 2025

- Location within Arkansas Location within the United States
- Location: 822 E. College St., Batesville, Arkansas
- Coordinates: 35°46′23″N 91°38′44″W
- Area: less than one acre
- Built: 1879
- Architectural style: Stick/eastlake
- NRHP reference No.: 82002115
- Added to NRHP: September 2, 1982

The Captain John T. Warner House is a historic house at 822 East College Street in Batesville, Arkansas. It is a 1 1/2-story wood-frame structure with a side-gable roof and clapboarded exterior. It has a gabled dormer at the center of the roof, with vernacular Eastlake style decoration. The house was built in 1879 by Captain John Warner. Warner was a prominent figure in local business and politics, serving as mayor of Batesville. He was instrumental in bringing about the electrification and provisioning of municipal water to the community.

The house is marked on-site as "Warner-Rich-Kelley 1880." It was listed on the National Register of Historic Places in 1982.

== See also ==
- National Register of Historic Places listings in Independence County, Arkansas
