= Mitchell House (Batesville, Arkansas) =

Historic house in Arkansas, United States

- U.S. National Register of Historic Places
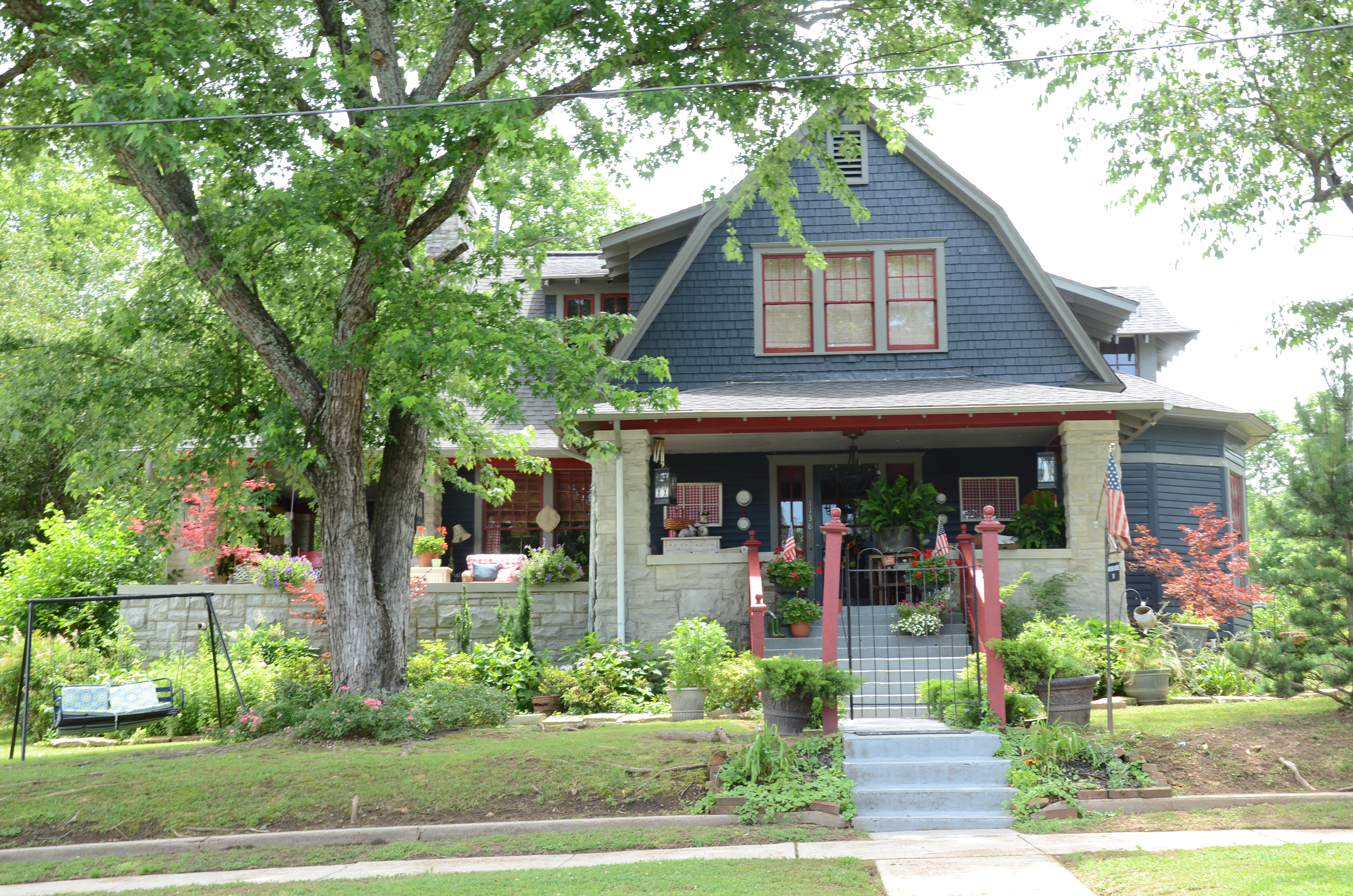

- Location within Arkansas Location within the United States
- Location: 1138 Main St., Batesville, Arkansas
- Coordinates: 35°46′33″N 91°38′36″W
- Area: less than one acre
- Built: 1917
- Architect: Charles L. Thompson
- Architectural style: Dutch colonial
- MPS: Thompson, Charles L., Design Collection TR
- NRHP reference No.: 82000835
- Added to NRHP: December 22, 1982

The Mitchell House is a historic house at 1183 Main Street in Batesville, Arkansas. It is a two-story wood-frame structure, with weatherboard siding, and a cross-gable roof configuration. The front facade is dominated by a gambreled gable projecting over the front porch, which is fashioned out of locally sourced limestone, including the facing on the supporting piers. The house was built in 1917 to a design by Arkansas architect Charles L. Thompson.

The house was listed on the National Register of Historic Places in 1982.

== See also ==
- National Register of Historic Places listings in Independence County, Arkansas
