= Moorefield School =

- U.S. National Register of Historic Places
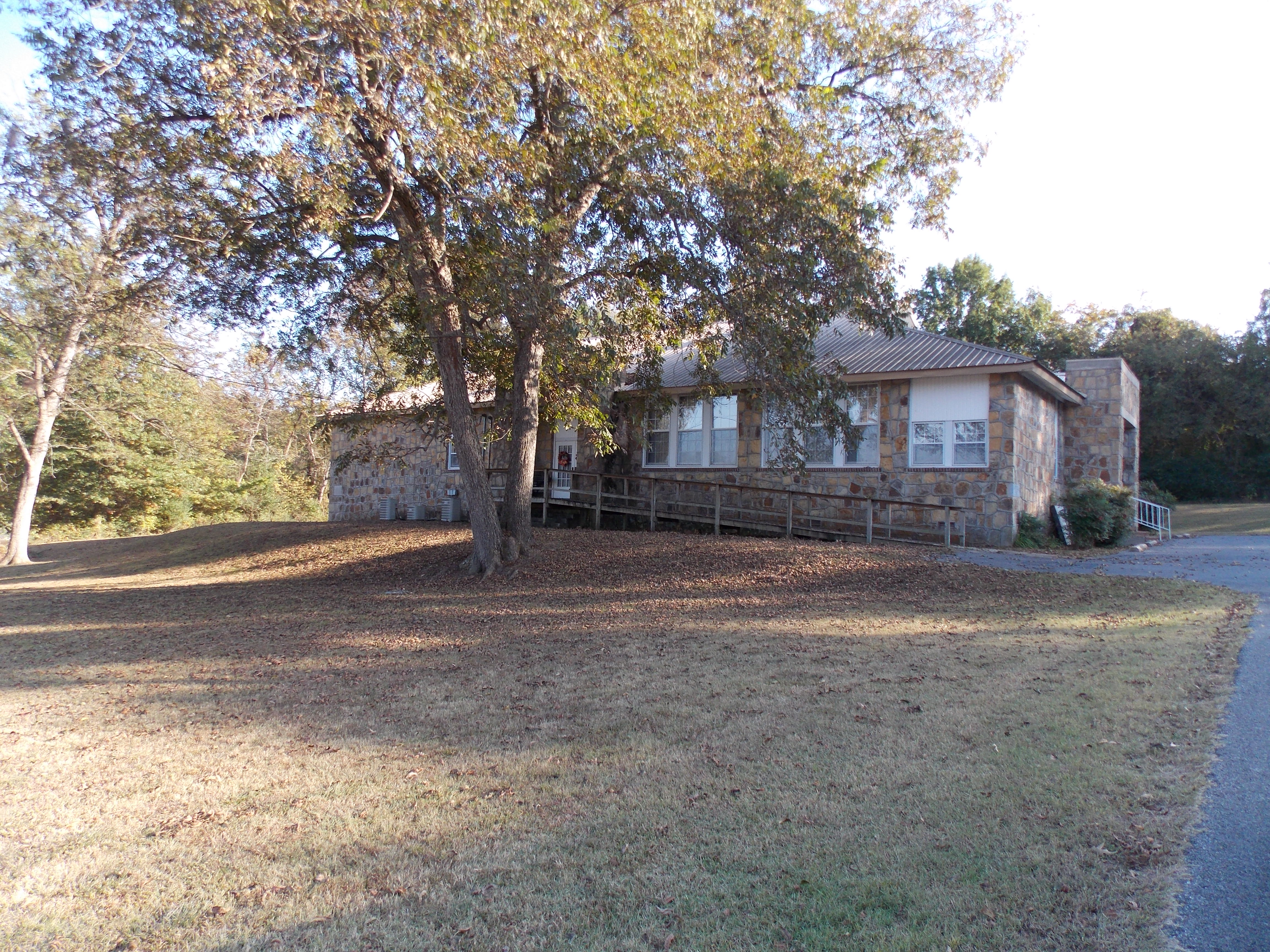

- Location within Arkansas Location within the United States
- Location: 65 Ham St. Moorefield, Arkansas
- Coordinates: 35.7658°N 91.5700°W
- Area: less than one acre
- Built by: National Youth Administration
- Architectural style: Bungalow/American craftsman, Plain Traditional
- MPS: Public Schools in the Ozarks MPS
- NRHP reference No.: 92001109
- Added to NRHP: September 4, 1992

The Moorefield School is a historic former school building on Ham Street in Moorefield, Arkansas. It is a broad rectangular single-story building built out of fieldstone, with a gable-on-hip roof that has exposed rafter ends in the Craftsman style. Entrances on the north and west sides are set under parapeted square porches. The school was built in 1936–37 with funding from the National Youth Administration and served the community as a school until 1947. It now houses the Rehoboth Baptist Church.

The building was listed on the National Register of Historic Places in 1992.

== See also ==
- National Register of Historic Places listings in Independence County, Arkansas
