= Lee's Chapel Church and Masonic Hall =

Historic church in Arkansas, United States

- U.S. National Register of Historic Places
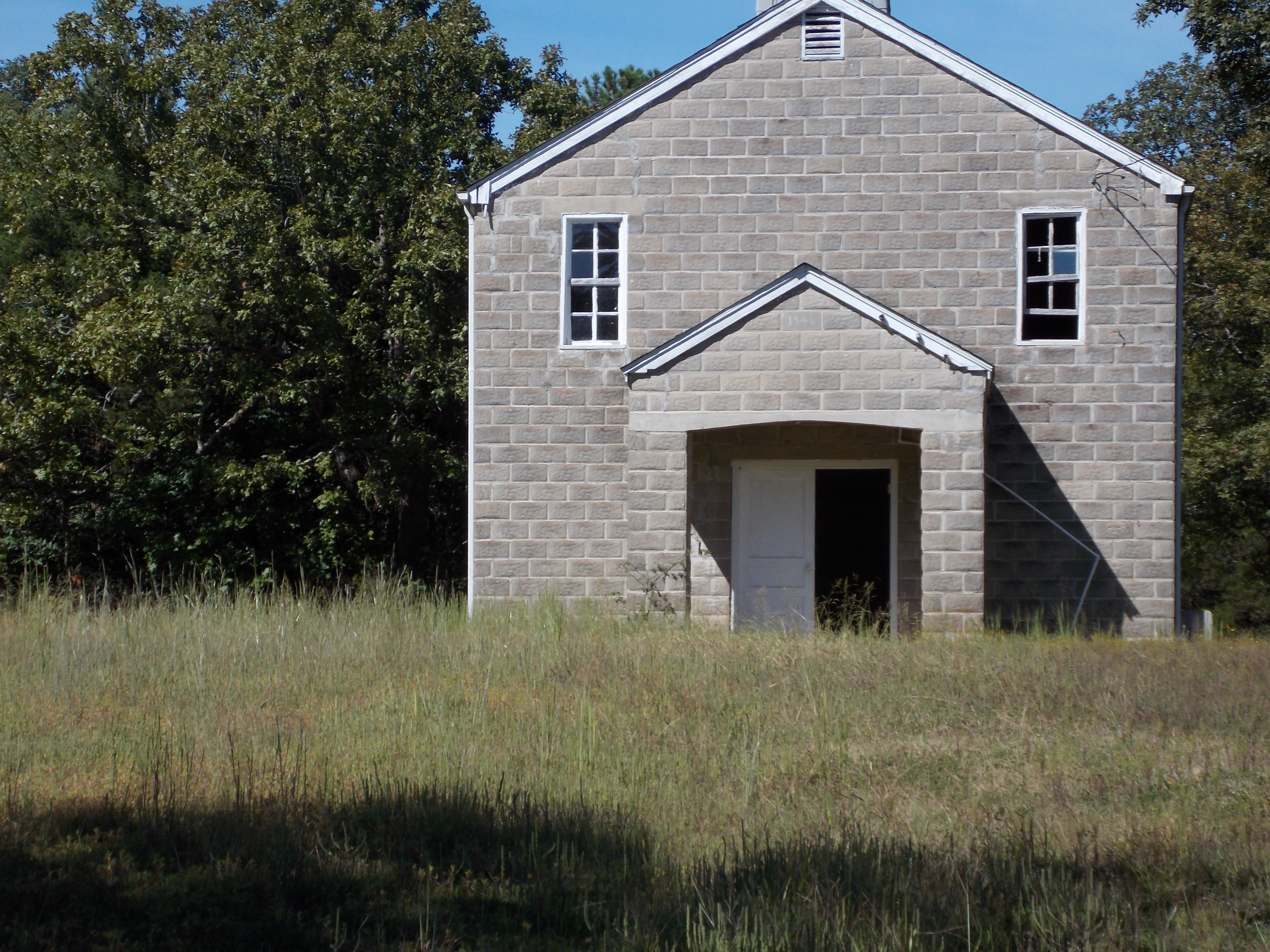

- Location within Arkansas Location within the United States
- Nearest city: Cushman, Arkansas
- Coordinates: 35°54′9″N 91°38′32″W
- Area: 2 acres (0.81 ha)
- Built: 1946
- Architectural style: Masonic Temple
- NRHP reference No.: 01000482
- Added to NRHP: May 10, 2001

Lee's Chapel Church and Masonic Hall is a historic Masonic building in rural northern Independence County, Arkansas, US. It is located on Sandtown Road, about 8 miles (13 km) east of Cushman. It is a two-story gable-roofed structure, built out of concrete blocks resting on a poured concrete foundation. The roof is shingled, and topped by a small belfry. It was built in 1946 as a joint project of the Lee's Chapel Methodist Church and Montgomery Lodge No. 360. The lodge subsequently moved to Cave City.

The building was listed on the National Register of Historic Places in 2001. It is distinctive as the only known concrete-block church in the northwestern part of the county.

== See also ==
- National Register of Historic Places listings in Independence County, Arkansas
