= Bethel African Methodist Episcopal Church (Batesville, Arkansas) =

Historic church in Arkansas, United States

- U.S. National Register of Historic Places
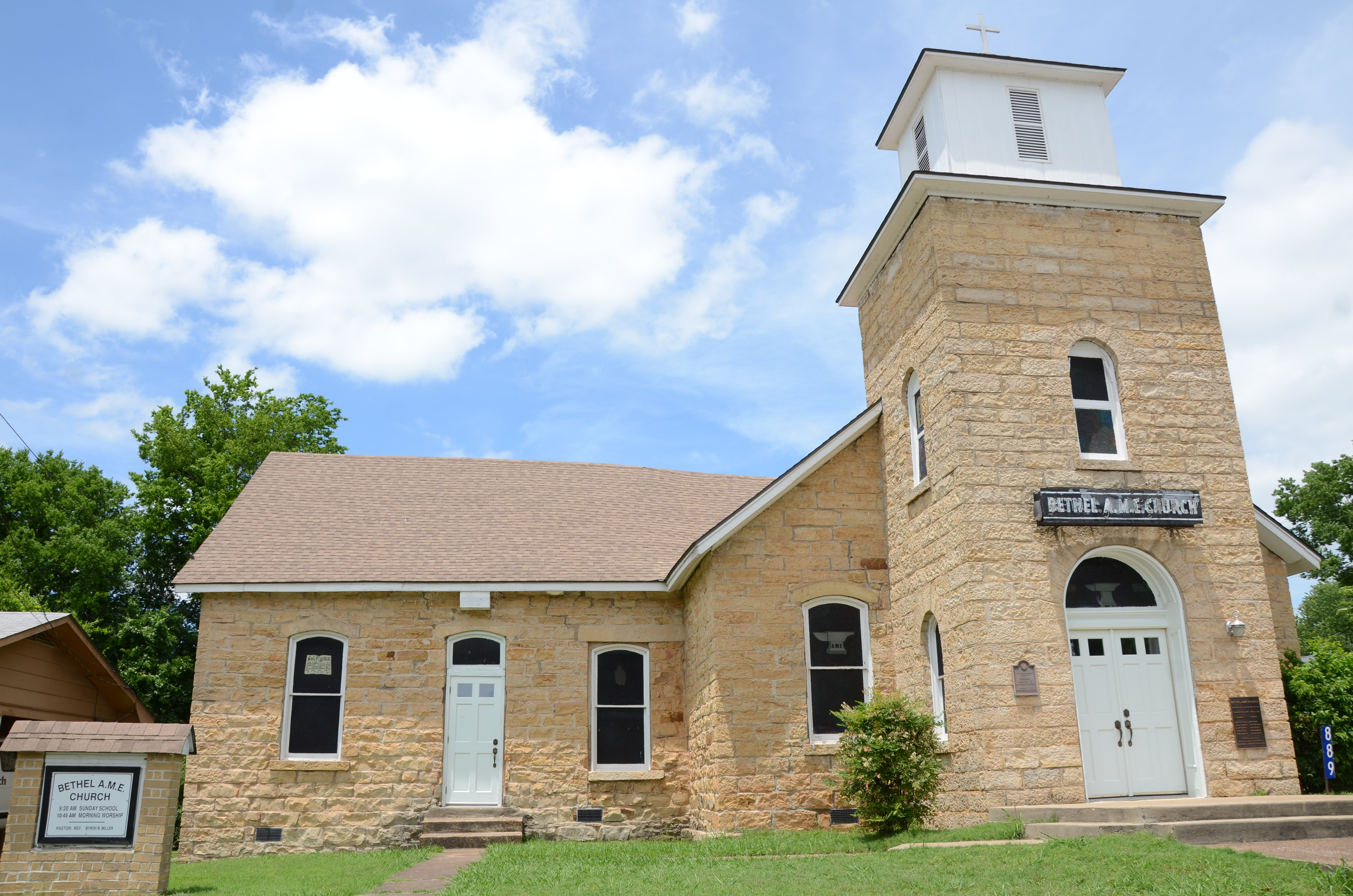

- Location within Arkansas Location within the United States
- Location: 895 Oak St., Batesville, Arkansas
- Coordinates: 35°46′20″N 91°38′14″W
- Area: less than one acre
- Built: 1882
- NRHP reference No.: 86002875
- Added to NRHP: October 16, 1986

The Bethel African Methodist Episcopal Church is a historic church at 895 Oak Street in Batesville, Arkansas. It is a single-story sandstone structure, with a gable roof and a projecting square tower at the front. The tower rises in stone to a hipped skirt, above which is a wood-frame belfry, which is topped by a shallow-pitch pyramidal roof. The main entrance is set in the base of the tower, inside a round-arch opening. Built in 1881, it is the oldest surviving church building in the city.

The church was listed on the National Register of Historic Places in 1986.

== See also ==
- National Register of Historic Places listings in Independence County, Arkansas
