= Hankins' Store =

- U.S. National Register of Historic Places
- Location within Arkansas Location within the United States
- Location: NE. corner of Ferry Rd. & Main St., Oil Trough, Arkansas
- Coordinates: 35°37′56″N 91°27′47″W
- Area: less than one acre
- Built: 1904
- NRHP reference No.: 14000248
- Added to NRHP: May 23, 2014

Hankins' Store is a historic commercial building at Ferry Road and Main Street (Arkansas Highway 14) in Oil Trough, Arkansas. It is a single-story wood-frame structure, built out of local cypress lumber, with a gable roof and clapboard siding that is original to its 1904 construction. An open porch extends across its front. The store stands near the White River Slough, a former course of the White River. It served the local community for almost exactly 100 years, closing in 2004, and typifies early 20th-century general stores.

The building was listed on the National Register of Historic Places in 2014.

== See also ==
- National Register of Historic Places listings in Independence County, Arkansas
