= National Guard Armory (Batesville, Arkansas) =

- U.S. National Register of Historic Places
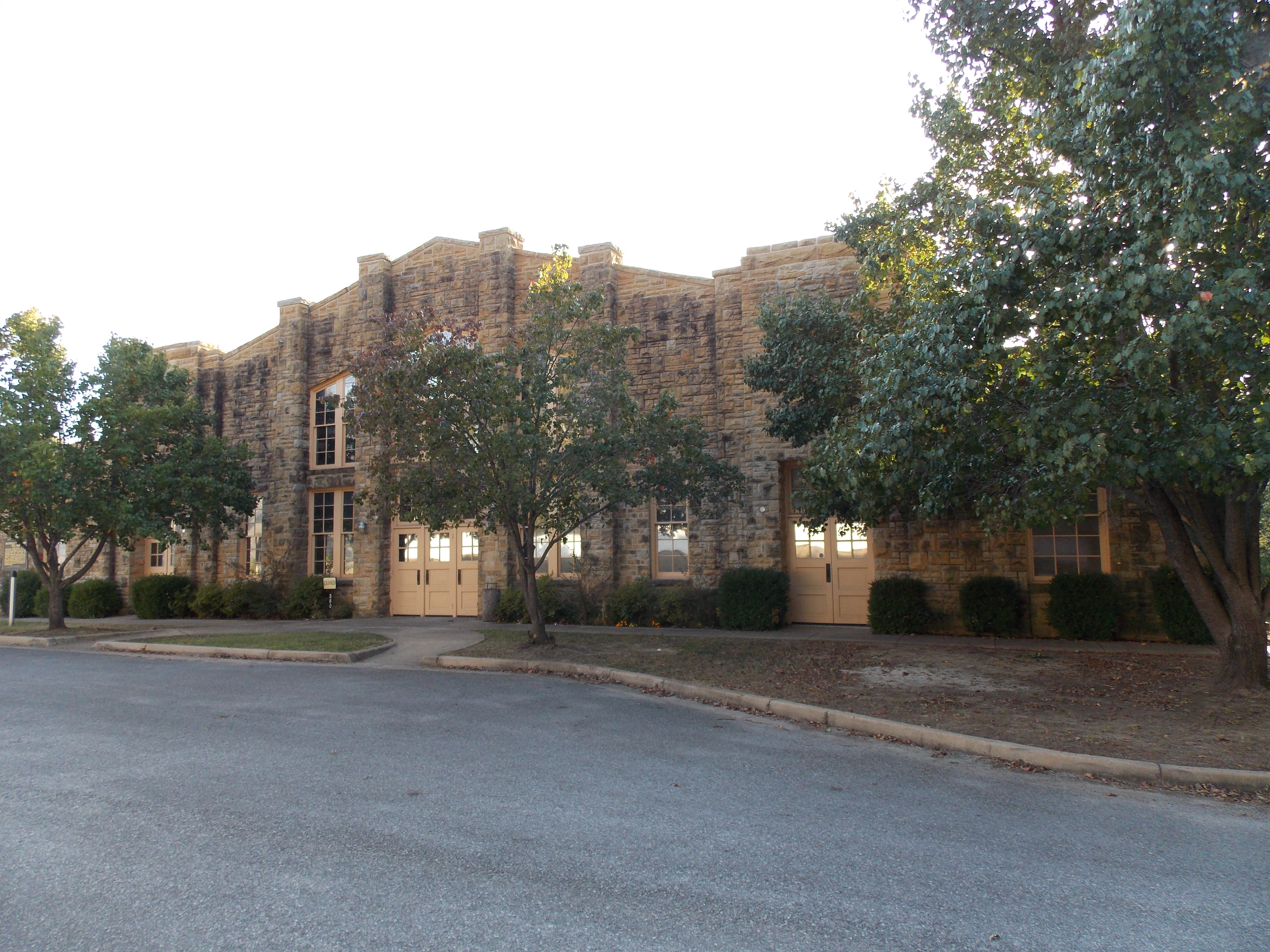

- Location within Arkansas Location within the United States
- Location: 380 S. Ninth St., Batesville, Arkansas
- Coordinates: 35°46′21″N 91°38′37″W
- Area: less than one acre
- Built: 1936
- Architect: Peter Blaauw
- Architectural style: Art Deco, Gothic Revival
- NRHP reference No.: 98000579
- Added to NRHP: May 29, 1998

The former National Guard Armory of Batesville, Arkansas, is located at 380 South Ninth Street. Built in 1936, it is a large and imposing sandstone structure with Gothic Revival and Art Deco features.

It was designed by Peter Blaauw, a Dutch architect from Sulphur Rock, and built with funding from the Works Progress Administration. After the National Guard vacated the facility in 1976, it was used for storage and sat vacant.

The building was listed on the National Register of Historic Places in 1998.

== Old Independence Regional Museum ==
In 1998, the building was repurposed into a museum to interpret the history of Independence County, a historical county that existed in Arkansas from 1820 and originally included land from all or part of Baxter, Cleburne, Fulton, Izard, Jackson, Marion, Poinsett, Sharp, Stone, White, and Woodruff counties. The museum held its grand opening and dedication on September 12, 1998.

== See also ==
- National Register of Historic Places listings in Independence County, Arkansas
