= Batesville Confederate Monument =

- U.S. National Register of Historic Places
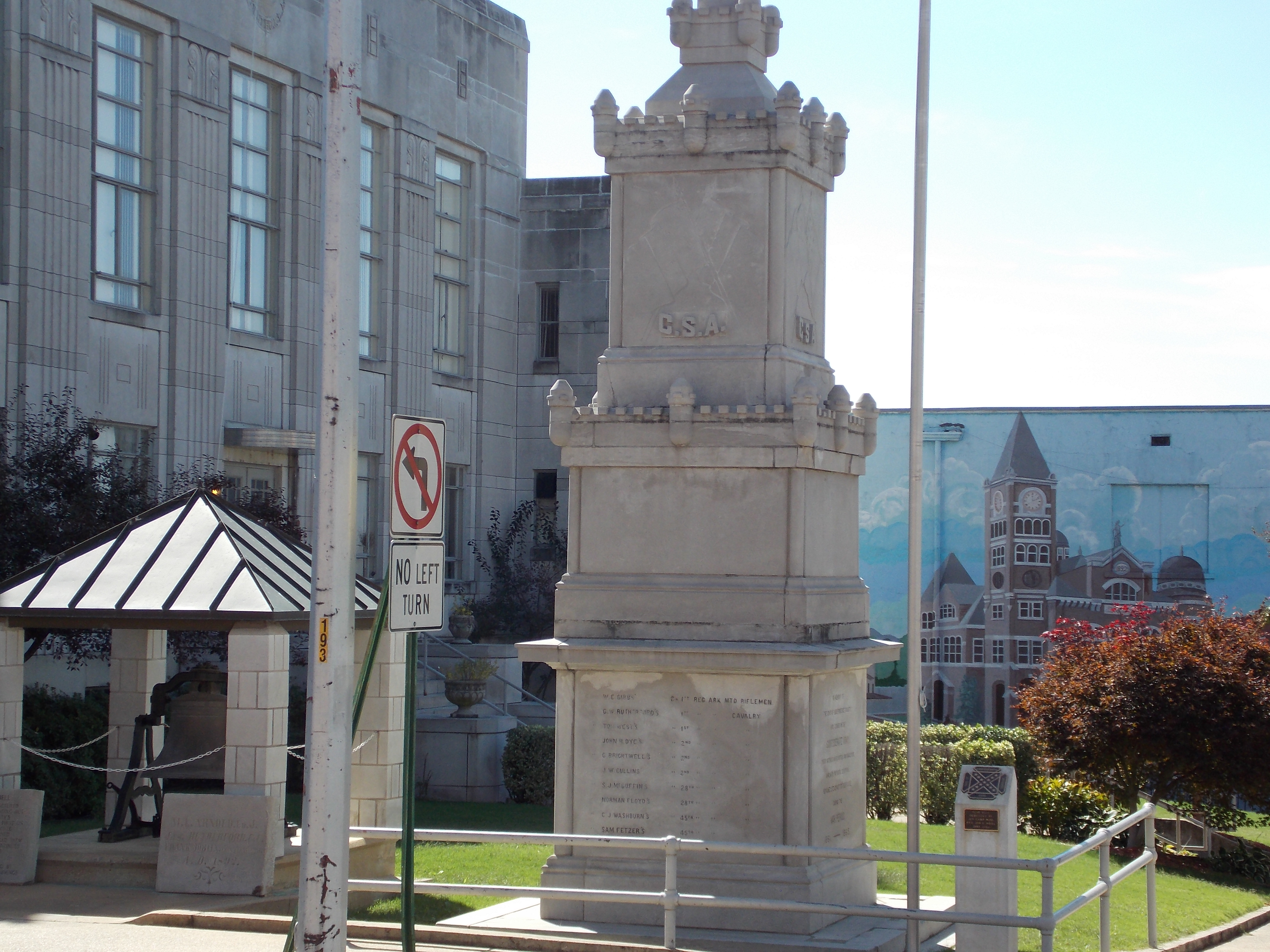
- Batesville Confederate Monument in 2015

- Location within Arkansas Location within the United States
- Location: NE corner of Courthouse Lawn, jct. of S. Broad St. and W. Main St., Batesville, Arkansas
- Coordinates: 35°46′13″N 91°39′10″W
- Area: less than one acre
- Built: 1907
- Architect: Otto Pfeiffer
- Architectural style: Classical Revival
- MPS: Civil War Commemorative Sculpture MPS
- NRHP reference No.: 96000504
- Added to NRHP: May 3, 1996

The Batesville Confederate Monument is located at the southeast corner of Main and Broad Streets in Batesville, Arkansas. It is a square monument, about 20 feet (6.1 m) in height, divided into four stages, and built out of local limestone. The first three-stage have a base trim element, and are unadorned except for inscriptions. The divider between the first and second stages is a projecting shelf, while that above the second and third stages resembles a turreted battlement. The monument was placed in 1907 by local chapters of the United Daughters of the Confederacy.

The monument was listed on the National Register of Historic Places in 1996.

== See also ==
- National Register of Historic Places listings in Independence County, Arkansas
