= Wycough–Jones House =

Historic house in Arkansas, United States

- Wycough-Jones House
- U.S. National Register of Historic Places
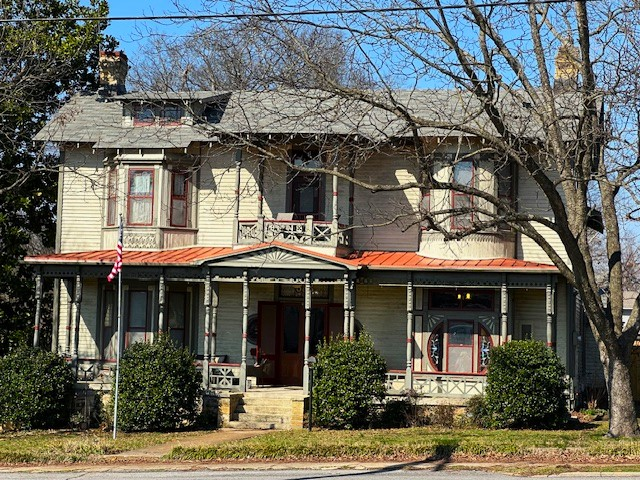
- The Wycough-Jones House in Batesville AR, February 2025

- Location within Arkansas Location within the United States
- Location: 683 Water St., Batesville, Arkansas
- Coordinates: 35°46′27″N 91°38′57″W
- Area: less than one acre
- Architectural style: Victorian
- NRHP reference No.: 75000393
- Added to NRHP: May 2, 1975

The Wycough–Jones House is a historic house at 683 Water Street in Batesville, Arkansas. It is a two-story wood-frame structure, with a hip roof and weatherboard siding. The front facade has a single-story porch extending across its width, and a smaller second-story porch above the main entrance, which is set in the center of three bays. The outer bays have uniquely different projecting bays on both the first and second levels. Built about 1878, it is one of the few remaining Victorian-era homes that remains in Batesville.

The house was listed on the National Register of Historic Places in 1975.

== See also ==
- National Register of Historic Places listings in Independence County, Arkansas
