= Cook-Morrow House =

Historic house in Arkansas, United States

- U.S. National Register of Historic Places
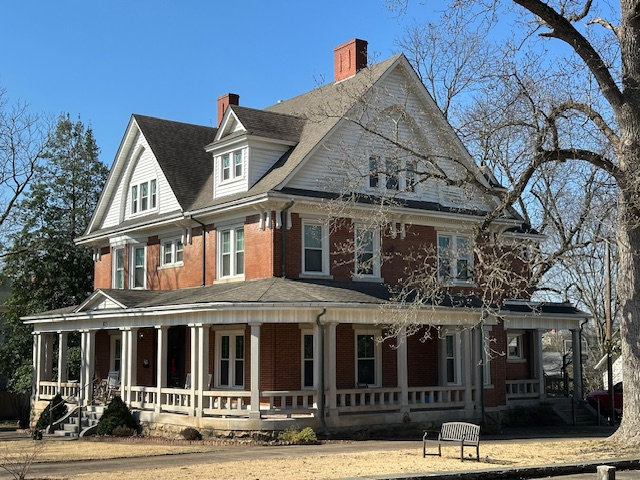
- The Cook-Morrow House in Batesville, Ark., February 2025

- Location within Arkansas Location within the United States
- Location: 875 Main St., Batesville, Arkansas
- Coordinates: 35°46′27″N 91°38′50″W
- Area: less than one acre
- Built: 1909
- Architect: John P. Kingston
- Architectural style: Shingle Style
- NRHP reference No.: 77000256
- Added to NRHP: July 29, 1977

The Cook-Morrow House is a historic house at 875 Main Street in Batesville, Arkansas. It is a 2 1/2-story wood-frame structure, with a cross-gabled roof configuration and wooden shingle and brick veneer exterior. A porch wraps around the front and right side. The front-facing gable has a recessed arch section with a band of three sash windows in it. Built in 1909, this Shingle style house was designed by John P. Kingston of Worcester, Massachusetts, and is one of Independence County's most architecturally sophisticated buildings. The house was built for Confederate officer Virgil Young Cook and his family.

The house was listed on the National Register of Historic Places in 1977.

== See also ==
- National Register of Historic Places listings in Independence County, Arkansas
