= Thida, Arkansas =

- Unincorporated community
- Location within Arkansas Location within the United States
- Coordinates: 35°34′16″N 91°28′44″W
- Country: United States
- State: Arkansas
- County: Independence
- Elevation: 299 ft (91 m)
- Time zone: UTC-6 (Central (CST))
  - Summer (DST): UTC-5 (CDT)
- ZIP code: 72165
- Area code: 870
- GNIS feature ID: 58739

Thida is an unincorporated community in Independence County, Arkansas, United States. Thida is 4 miles (6.4 km) south-southwest of Oil Trough. Thida has a post office with ZIP code 72165.
