= Pfeiffer, Arkansas =

- Unincorporated community
- Location within Arkansas Location within the United States
- Coordinates: 35°49′26″N 91°35′16″W
- Country: United States
- State: Arkansas
- County: Independence
- Elevation: 394 ft (120 m)
- Time zone: UTC-6 (Central (CST))
  - Summer (DST): UTC-5 (CDT)
- Area code: 870
- GNIS feature ID: 58353

Pfeiffer is an unincorporated community in Independence County, Arkansas, United States. Pfeiffer is located on U.S. Route 167, northeast of Batesville.
