= Desha, Arkansas =

- Census-designated place
- Location within Arkansas Location within the United States
- Coordinates: 35°43′50″N 91°41′08″W
- Country: United States
- State: Arkansas
- County: Independence
- Elevation: 299 ft (91 m)

Population (2020)
  - Total: 715
- Time zone: UTC-6 (Central (CST))
  - Summer (DST): UTC-5 (CDT)
- ZIP code: 72527
- Area code: 870
- GNIS feature ID: 2805636

Desha is an unincorporated community and census-designated place (CDP) in Independence County, Arkansas, United States. It was first listed as a CDP in the 2020 census with a population of 715.

Desha is located along Arkansas Highway 25, 3 miles (4.8 km) southwest of Batesville. Desha has a post office with ZIP code 72527.

== Demographics ==
Historical population
Census	Pop.	Note	%±
2020	715		—
U.S. Decennial Census; 2020

=== 2020 census ===
Desha CDP, Arkansas – Demographic Profile (NH = Non-Hispanic) Note: the US Census treats Hispanic/Latino as an ethnic category. This table excludes Latinos from the racial categories and assigns them to a separate category. Hispanics/Latinos may be of any race.
Race / Ethnicity	Pop 2020	% 2020
White alone (NH)	647	90.49%
Black or African American alone (NH)	2	0.28%
Native American or Alaska Native alone (NH)	0	0.00%
Asian alone (NH)	1	0.14%
Pacific Islander alone (NH)	1	0.14%
Some Other Race alone (NH)	2	0.28%
Mixed Race/Multi-Racial (NH)	33	4.62%
Hispanic or Latino (any race)	29	4.06%
Total	715	100.00%

== Education ==
Batesville School District operates area public schools. The Desha School District merged into the Batesville district on July 1, 1985.

Batesville High School is the Batesville district's sole comprehensive high school.
