= Vada Sheid =

Arkansas politician (1916–2008)

Honorable Vada Sheid

Member of the Arkansas House of Representatives from the 40th district
- In office January 1993 – January 1995
- Preceded by: Ed Gilbert
- Succeeded by: Joe Hudson

Member of the Arkansas Senate from the 20th (later 3rd) district
- In office January 10, 1977 – January 14, 1985
- Preceded by: District created
- Succeeded by: Steve Luelf
- Constituency: Marion, Boone, Searcy, and Newton Counties

Member of the Arkansas House of Representatives from the 5th (later 44th) district
- In office January 9, 1967 – January 10, 1977
- Preceded by: Orville D. Pendergrass
- Succeeded by: Ed Gilbert

Personal details
- Born: August 19, 1916 Wideman, Arkansas
- Died: February 11, 2008 (aged 91) Mountain Home, Arkansas
- Resting place: Roller Memorial Gardens, Mountain Home
- Party: Democrat
- Spouse: Carl R. Sheid (m. 1941; died 2005)
- Profession: Businesswoman, politician

Vada Sheid (/ˈʃɛd/ Shed) (August 19, 1916 – February 11, 2008) was a politician from Mountain Home, Arkansas, who served in the Arkansas General Assembly for 20 years; in the Arkansas House of Representatives from 1967 to 1977, the Arkansas Senate from 1977 to 1985, and returning to the House during the 79th Arkansas General Assembly. She is the first woman to serve in both houses of the General Assembly, and the first non-widow's succession woman to serve in the Arkansas Senate. Known by constituents as "Miss Vada", she worked on behalf of Ozark Mountain residents with a focus on education and infrastructure projects.

== Early life ==
Sheid was born on August 19, 1916, in Wideman, Arkansas, the only child of J. W. "Bill" Webb and Gertrude (née Reynolds) Webb. She was named Vada by her maternal grandmother. Bill Webb was very involved in local politics, and took Vada to campaign events and gatherings as a child in Izard and Fulton counties. The family moved to Calico Rock in 1926 and attended school in the Calico Rock School District, including participating in school plays and debates. She graduated from Calico Rock High School in 1934 during the Great Depression among 12 other students. Her first formal political role was volunteering for John C. Ashley's bid for the 1936 Arkansas gubernatorial election. Ashley withdrew before the Democratic primary, but encouraged Sheid to run for office in the future. Following a housefire at the Webb home that burned the family's savings, Vada attended Draughon’s Practical Business College in Little Rock, Arkansas, rather than a four-year college she had planned to attend, followed by a job as Izard County Welfare Director.

She married Carl R. Sheid on December 31, 1940, the son and grandson of the area's country doctors. They moved to Little Rock, where Sheid took a job with the state welfare department. The newlyweds briefly lived in El Dorado, Arkansas, after Carl was promoted to be store manager of the El Dorado Kroger, before moving to Mountain Home. After Carl was drafted during World War II, Vada worked as a clerk for the government on the construction of Norfork Dam, and moved to Little Rock to work for Nancy Hall in the Arkansas Secretary of State Crip Hall's office. After briefly operating a grocery store, the couple bought a furniture store and ran it together. They had a son, Richard, in 1948.

== Political career ==
Encouraged by her father, Sheid challenged incumbent Baxter County Treasurer Bob Tipton in 1956. Losing by 200 votes, she challenged Tipton again two years later and won the office. Sheid held the position for three two-year terms until she was defeated by Don Cockrum. In 1966, Sheid dying father convinced her to run for the Arkansas House of Representatives District 5 seat covering Baxter and Fulton counties. He died three days after she filed as a candidate; Sheid defeated Russell J. Benton in the Democratic primary and Republican incumbent Orville D. Pendergrass in the general election. Sheid would defeat Pendergrass to retain the seat by 54 votes in 1968 and 430 votes in 1970. Early legislative successes included securing funding for development plans of Mammoth Spring State Park, extension of Arkansas Highway 177 east of Norfork Dam, a bridge over the White River on Arkansas Highway 341, and a new bridge on Arkansas Highway 289 at Saddle.

== Return to the House ==
Sheid returned to the Arkansas House of Representatives in 1993 to serve in the 79th Arkansas General Assembly.

Representative Ed Gilbert (D-Mountain Home) had sought re-election in District 40, but later revealed he lived outside the district and thus was ineligible. The local Democratic Party voted Sheid as Gilbert's replacement on September 11 for the November 3, 1992, election against Doris DeSousa. The Baxter County Republican Committee challenged the Democrats' ability to replace Gilbert in court.

== Legacy ==
She wrote an autobiography, Vada: Nothing Personal, Just Politics. It was published posthumously. Arkansas State University – Mountain Home professor Clement Mulloy wrote a book about her and has given presentations on her life. The Vada Sheid Community Development Center is named for her.

== See also ==
- Dorathy M. Allen, contemporary politician and friend
