= Melbourne School District =

School district in Arkansas

Location
- 303 School Drive; Melbourne, Arkansas 72556 United States

District information
- Grades: PK–12
- Superintendent: Janie Darr
- Asst. superintendent(s): Mark Sparks
- Accreditation(s): Arkansas Department of Education
- Schools: 3
- NCES District ID: 0509720

Students and staff
- Students: 919
- Teachers: 68.07 (on FTE)
- Staff: 167.07 (on FTE)
- Student–teacher ratio: 13.50
- Athletic conference: 3A Region 1 (2012–14)
- District mascot: Bearkatz
- Colors: Red; White; Blue

Other information
- Website: bearkatz.k12.ar.us

Melbourne School District is a public school district based in Melbourne, Arkansas, United States. The district encompasses 256.45 square miles (664.2 km^{2}) of land and serves early childhood, elementary and secondary education to numerous Izard County and Sharp County communities including Melbourne and all or portions of Sidney, Mountain View, Evening Shade, Mount Pleasant, Sage, Brockwell, Guion, and Violet Hill.

== History ==
On July 1, 2004, the Mount Pleasant School District was merged into the Melbourne School District.

== Schools ==
Schools include:

- Melbourne High School (Bearkatz), located in Melbourne and serving more than 400 students in grades 7 through 12.
- Melbourne Elementary School, located in Melbourne and serving more than 350 students in kindergarten through grade 6.
- Mount Pleasant Elementary School, located in Mount Pleasant and serving approximately 150 students in kindergarten through grade 6.

Awards and recognition: Melbourne schools have been nationally recognized on several occasions.

- In 2009, Mount Pleasant Elementary School received the top honor from the U.S. Department of Education in being recognized as a National Blue Ribbon School.
- In 2012, Mount Pleasant is recognized as a National Title I Distinguished School by the Arkansas Department of Education (ADE).
- Melbourne High School is nationally recognized as a Bronze Medalist in the Best High Schools Report 2012 and 2015 by U.S. News & World Report.
- Melbourne High School is one of twenty high schools to be recognized with the 2012 College Readiness Award by the Arkansas ACT Council in recognition of improving the participation rate of students taking the ACT college readiness exam.
