= Izard County Consolidated School District =

School district in Arkansas

Location
- AR 9 North; Brockwell, Arkansas 72517 United States

District information
- Motto: Everyone Successful Everyday
- Grades: PK–12
- Accreditation: Arkansas Department of Education
- Schools: 3
- NCES District ID: 0500021

Students and staff
- Students: 540
- Teachers: 46.59 (on FTE basis)
- Staff: 114.59 (on FTE basis)
- Student–teacher ratio: 11.59
- Athletic conference: 1A Region 2 (Basketball)
- District mascot: Cougar
- Colors: Black; Gray

Other information
- Website: icc.k12.ar.us

Izard County Consolidated School District (ICCSD) is a public school district based in Brockwell, Arkansas, United States. ICCSD supports more than 500 students with more than 110 faculty and staff at its three schools.

The school district encompasses 180.09 square miles (466.4 km^{2}) of land, including portions of Izard County and serving communities such as Franklin, almost all of Horseshoe Bend, Oxford, Violet Hill, Brockwell, Wiseman, and Ash Flat.

The district proves comprehensive education for pre-kindergarten through grade 12 and is accredited by the Arkansas Department of Education (ADE) and by AdvancED.

== History ==
The Oxford School District and the Violet Hill School District consolidated into Izard County Consolidated on July 1, 1985.

== Schools ==
- Izard County Consolidated High School, located in Brockwell and serving more than 150 students in grades 9 through 12.
- Izard County Consolidated Middle School, located in Brockwell and serving more than 150 students in grades 5 through 8.
- Izard County Consolidated Elementary School, located in Violet Hill and serving more than 200 students in pre-kindergarten through grade 4.
