= Arkansas Highway 56 =

State highway in Arkansas, United States

Highway 56

Route information
- Maintained by AHTD
- Length: 42.44 mi (68.30 km)
- Existed: 1926–present

Major junctions
- West end: AR 5 – Calico Rock
- AR 9 – Brockwell; US 167
- East end: AR 58 – Poughkeepsie

Location
- Country: United States
- State: Arkansas
- Counties: Izard, Sharp

Highway system
- Arkansas Highway System; Interstate; US; State; Business; Spurs; Suffixed; Scenic; Heritage
← I-55	→ I-57

Arkansas Highway 56 (AR 56 and Hwy. 56) is an east–west state highway in Sharp and Izard Counties. The route runs 42.44 miles (68.30 km) from Arkansas Highway 5 in Calico Rock east and south to Poughkeepsie.

== Route description ==
AR 56 begins in Calico Rock at Arkansas Highway 5, running north to Pineville. In Pineville, AR 56 serves as the southern terminus for AR 223, which runs north to Missouri. The route continues to run east through rural country to meet AR 9 in Brockwell near the historic Pine Ridge School Building and AR 289 in Franklin south of Horseshoe Bend. After Franklin, the route enters Sharp County, and a concurrency begins south with US 167 south of Ash Flat. AR 56 follows US 167 south for 11.4 miles (18.3 km) until Evening Shade, when AR 56 turns east. The highway continues east to AR 58 in Poughkeepsie, where the route terminates near the Poughkeepsie School Building on the National Register of Historic Places.

== History ==

Arkansas Highway 56 was one of the original 1926 Arkansas state highways. The route ran from Calico Rock to Ash Flat, terminating at AR 11. The modern alignment follows this alignment very closely, with one exception. The Evening Shade – Poughkeepsie segment was added to the state highway system in 1965 as an unpaved route, which was paved in 1986. US 167 was extended north in 1938, replacing AR 11 in the area. Most of the western segment was repaved around 2002.

== Major intersections ==
Mile markers reset at concurrencies.

County	Location	mi	km	Destinations	Notes
Izard	Calico Rock	0.00	0.00	AR 5 – Mountain View, Mountain Home, Ozark Folk Center, Blanchard Springs Caverns	
Izard	Calico Rock	2.8	4.5	AR 223 north – Pineville, Bexar	
Izard	Brockwell	14.3	23.0	AR 9 – Salem, Batesville, Melbourne	
Izard	Franklin	24.7	39.8	AR 289 north – Horseshoe Bend	
Sharp	Ash Flat	34.53	55.57	US 167 north to US 62 – Hardy	West end of US 167 overlap
Sharp	Evening Shade	0.00	0.00	US 167 south – Batesville	East end of US 167 overlap
Sharp	Poughkeepsie	7.91	12.73	AR 58	
1.000 mi = 1.609 km; 1.000 km = 0.621 mi: Concurrency terminus

== See also ==
- List of state highways in Arkansas
