= Arkansas Highway 175 =

State highway in Arkansas, United States

Highway 175
- AR 175 highlighted in red, AR 175S in blue

Route information
- Maintained by ArDOT
- Length: 21.80 mi (35.08 km)
- Existed: September 5, 1940 (Note: Map note: 175 Added to System by Resolution 9/5/40)–present

Major junctions
- South end: AR 289 in Cherokee Village
- US 62 / US 412 in Hardy
- North end: Wirth

Location
- Country: United States
- State: Arkansas
- Counties: Fulton, Sharp

Highway system
- Arkansas Highway System; Interstate; US; State; Business; Spurs; Suffixed; Scenic; Heritage
← AR 174	→ AR 176

Highway 175 (AR 175, Ark. 175, and Hwy. 175) is a state highway in Northeast Arkansas. The route begins at Highway 289 and runs north 39.07 miles (62.88 km) to Wirth. The highway was created as a short highway west of Hardy on September 5, 1940, with several reroutings and extensions throughout the 1960s and 1970s. One former alignment change was designated Highway 175 Spur, a spur route in Cherokee Village, in 1980. Both routes are maintained by the Arkansas Department of Transportation (ArDOT).

== Route description ==
Highway 175 begins at Highway 289 west of Cherokee Village in Northeast Arkansas. The route is the main east–west highway through the community, with a former alignment now known as Highway 175 Spur beginning near the center of town and running south. Cherokee Village is a planned retirement community by John A. Cooper, a forerunner to Bella Vista and Hot Springs Village, which also include a series of winding roads, cul-de-sacs, golf courses, and other retirement amenities.

Highway 175 intersects US Highway 62 (US 62) and US 412 shortly after entering Hardy, and a concurrency forms to the east through town. While passing through the city, US 62/US 412/AR 175 begin an overlap with US 63, which continues east until Highway 175 splits north from the concurrency.

Highway 175 runs north through a sparsely populated rural area toward Missouri. The highway runs northeasterly to the community of Sellers' Store before turning north along a section line road to terminate at Wirth. The roadway continues as Pleasant Run Road, with a gravel crossroad named Wirth Road. The terminus is 1.5 miles (2.4 km) from the Randolph County line and 3.5 miles (5.6 km) south of the Missouri state line.

== Major intersections ==
Mile markers reset at some concurrencies.

County	Location	mi	km	Destinations	Notes
Fulton	Cherokee Village	0.00	0.00	AR 289 – Mammoth Spring	Southern terminus
Stone	Cherokee Village			AR 175S south (Iroquois Drive)	AR 175S northern terminus
Stone	Hardy	8.85	14.24	US 62 / US 412 – Hardy, Ash Flat	Begin US 62/US 412 overlap
Stone	Hardy	See US 62/US 412			
Stone	Hardy	0.00	0.00	US 62 / US 63 / US 412 – Mammoth Spring, Ravenden, Hoxie	End US 62/US 63/US 412 overlap
Stone	Wirth	12.95	20.84	End state maintenance at Pleasant Run Road/Wirth Road	Northern terminus
1.000 mi = 1.609 km; 1.000 km = 0.621 mi: Concurrency terminus

== Cherokee Village spur ==
Iroquois Drive
- Location: Cherokee Village
- Length: 3.96 mi (6.37 km)
- Existed: April 9, 1980–present

Highway 175 Spur (AR 175, Ark. 175, Hwy. 175, and Iroquois Drive) is a 3.96-mile (6.37 km) spur route in Cherokee Village. The route was created by the ASHC on April 9, 1980 from a former alignment of AR 175.

=== Route description ===
It runs past several parks and terminates at US 62 BUS and US 412 south of Cherokee Village.

=== Major intersections ===
The entire route is in Sharp County.

Location	mi	km	Destinations	Notes
Cherokee Village	0.00	0.00	AR 175 (Cherokee Road/Okmulgee Drive) – Hardy	Northern terminus
Cherokee Village–Highland line	3.96	6.37	US 62 / US 412 – Ash Flat, Hardy	Southern terminus
1.000 mi = 1.609 km; 1.000 km = 0.621 mi

== See also ==
- List of state highways in Arkansas
