= Arkansas Highway 354 =

State highway in Arkansas, United States

Highway 354

Route information
- Maintained by AHTD

Section 1
- Length: 9.70 mi (15.61 km)
- West end: AR 9, Oxford
- East end: AR 289, Horseshoe Bend

Section 2
- Length: 12.65 mi (20.36 km)
- West end: US 167, Ash Flat
- East end: AR 58

Location
- Country: United States
- State: Arkansas
- Counties: Izard, Sharp

Highway system
- Arkansas Highway System; Interstate; US; State; Business; Spurs; Suffixed; Scenic; Heritage
← AR 353	→ AR 355

Arkansas Highway 354 is a designation for two east–west state highways in north Arkansas. The western segment of 9.70 miles (15.61 km) runs from Highway 9 in Oxford to Horseshoe Bend. An eastern segment of 12.65 miles (20.36 km) runs east from U.S. Route 167 in Ash Flat to Arkansas Highway 58.

== Route description ==
=== Oxford to Horseshoe Bend ===
The route begins at AR 9 in Oxford. The route runs east to Horseshoe Bend, where it terminates at AR 289. This segment of highway is named Cardinal Road, and passes through the unincorporated community of Wiseman.

=== Ash Flat to Highway 58 ===
Highway 354 begins in Ash Flat at US 167, and runs east as Main Street. The route winds southeast through Center to meet Arkansas Highway 58, where it terminates. Highway 354 runs along the southern part of the Harold E. Alexander Wildlife Management Area.

== Major intersections ==
County	Location	mi	km	Destinations	Notes
Izard	Oxford	0.0	0.0	AR 9 – Salem, Brockwell, Melbourne	Western terminus
Izard	Horseshoe Bend	9.70	15.61	AR 289 (N Bend Dr)	Eastern terminus
Highway 354 eastern segment begins in Ash Flat
Sharp	Ash Flat	0.0	0.0	US 167 (Ash Flat Dr) – Evening Shade, Hardy	Western terminus
Sharp		12.65	20.36	AR 58 (Ash Flat Dr) – Williford, Poughkeepsie	Eastern terminus
1.000 mi = 1.609 km; 1.000 km = 0.621 mi

== See also ==
- List of state highways in Arkansas
