= Arkansas Highway 289 =

State highway in Arkansas, United States

Highway 289
- AR 289 highlighted in red

Route information
- Maintained by ArDOT

Section 1
- Length: 4.93 mi (7.93 km)
- South end: AR 69B at Sage
- North end: End state maintenance at Zion

Section 2
- Length: 37.89 mi (60.98 km)
- South end: AR 56 in Franklin
- North end: AR 9 in Mammoth Spring

Location
- Country: United States
- State: Arkansas

Highway system
- Arkansas Highway System; Interstate; US; State; Business; Spurs; Suffixed; Scenic; Heritage
← AR 288	→ AR 290

Highway 289 (AR 289, Ark. 289, and Hwy. 289) is a designation for two north–south state highways in north central Arkansas. A southern route of 4.93 miles (7.93 km) runs north from Highway 69B (AR 69B) at Sage to Zion. A second route of 37.89 miles (60.98 km) begins at Highway 56 in Franklin and runs north to Highway 9 in Mammoth Spring.

== Route description ==
=== Sage to Zion ===
Highway 289 begins at AR 69B in Sage approximately 1.5 miles (2.4 km) east of Melbourne in Izard County. The route runs north to the Caney Springs Cumberland Presbyterian Church, which is listed on the National Register of Historic Places (NRHP). Highway 289 continues northeast to Zion, where state maintenance ends and the road continues north under county maintenance.

=== Mammoth Spring to Franklin ===
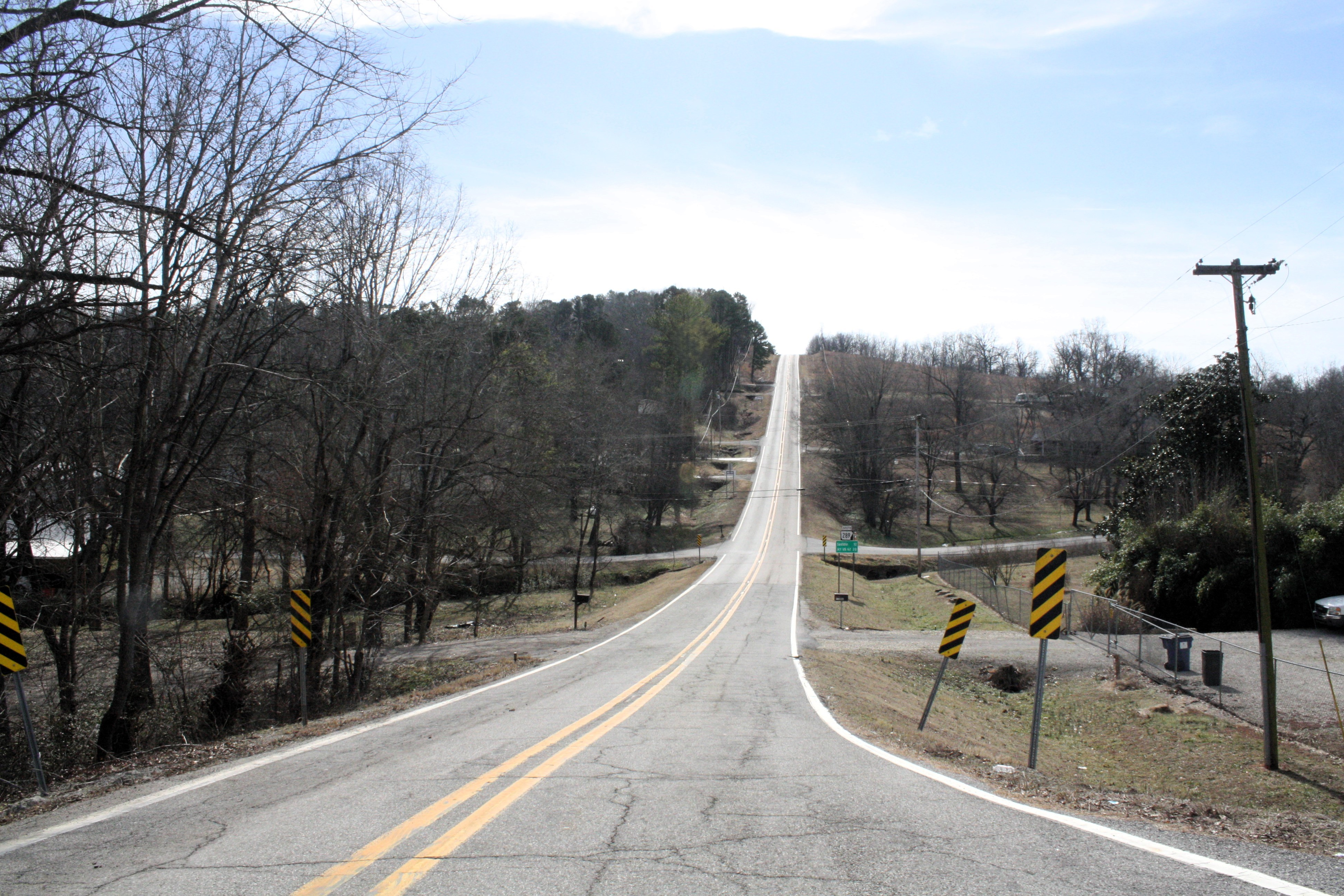
First reassurance marker for Highway 289 south of US 62 junction in Mammoth Spring

Highway 289 begins in the northeastern corner of Izard County at Highway 56 in Franklin. The route runs north to a junction with AR 354 in Horseshoe Bend. The route continues north into Fulton County to Glencoe where it begins a concurrency with US Route 62/US Route 412 (US 62/US 412). These three routes overlap for 1 mile (1.6 km) east until Kittle when Highway 289 turns north and enters Cherokee Village. Highway 289 has a junction with Highway 175 in the western part of the city before exiting the city limits and continuing north to Saddle. The highways passes the Saddle Store, a two-story general store built in 1916 and listed on the NRHP on its way north through the county. Highway 289 crosses over English Creek on a historic 1929 Pratt through truss bridge built by Virginia Bridge & Iron Company, also NRHP-listed, heading north as well. Shortly after entering Mammoth Spring, the highway terminates at Highway 9 near the Missouri state line.

== Major intersections ==
County	Location	mi	km	Destinations	Notes
Izard	Sage	0.00	0.00	AR 69B	Southern terminus
Izard	Zion	4.93	7.93	End state maintenance	Northern terminus
Izard	Highway 289 begins in Franklin				
Izard	Franklin	0.00	0.00	AR 56 – Ash Flat, Brockwell	Southern terminus
Izard	Horseshoe Bend	5.40	8.69	AR 354 west (Cardinal Road) – Wiseman	AR 354 eastern terminus
Fulton		10.46– 17.66	16.83– 28.42	US 62 / US 412	
Fulton	Cherokee Village	19.44	31.29	AR 175 north – Cherokee Village	AR 175 southern terminus
Fulton	Mammoth Spring	37.89	60.98	AR 9 (Main Street) – Salem	Northern terminus
1.000 mi = 1.609 km; 1.000 km = 0.621 mi: Concurrency terminus
