= Saddle Store =

- U.S. National Register of Historic Places
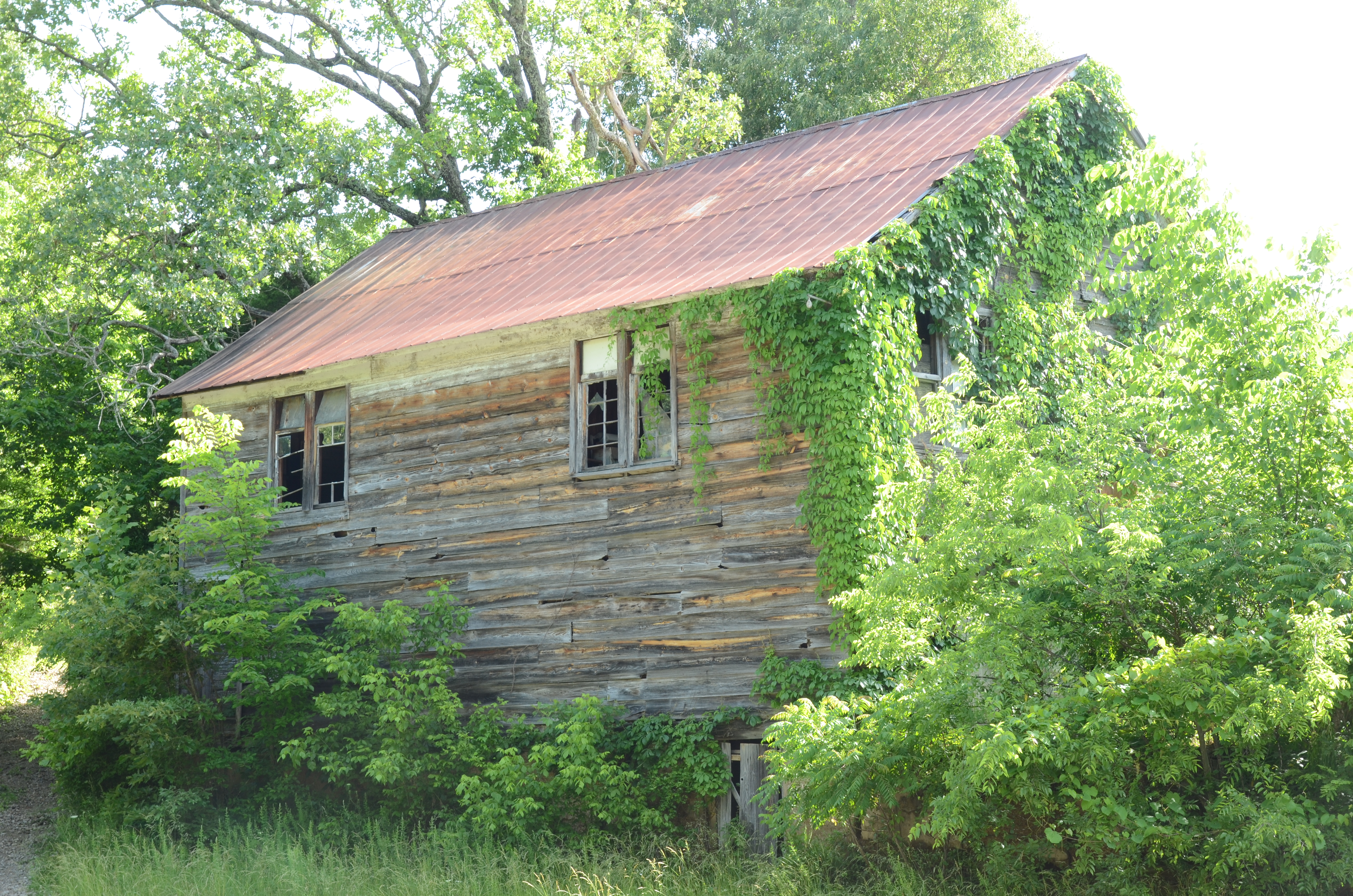

- Location within Arkansas Location within the United States
- Location: AR 289, Saddle, Arkansas
- Coordinates: 36°21′31″N 91°38′14″W
- Area: 1.1 acres (0.45 ha)
- Built: 1916
- Architect: Joe Hatman
- Architectural style: Plain/Traditional
- NRHP reference No.: 00001366
- Added to NRHP: November 15, 2000

The Saddle Store is a historic general store and gas station on the east side of Arkansas Highway 289 in the hamlet of Saddle in eastern Fulton County, Arkansas. It is a two-story wood frame vernacular structure with a gable roof, set parallel to and near the road. The south-facing main facade has a centered entry flanked by sash windows, with two pairs of sash windows on the second level. The store was built in 1916, and served as the community's general store until 1988. In addition to its retail function, its upstairs space also served as a community hall, housing elections and social functions.

The building was listed on the National Register of Historic Places in 2000.

== See also ==
- National Register of Historic Places listings in Fulton County, Arkansas
