= Arkansas Highway 223 =

State highway in Arkansas, United States

Highway 223
- AR 223 highlighted in red

Route information
- Maintained by ArDOT
- Length: 29.92 mi (48.15 km)

Major junctions
- South end: AR 56 in Calico Rock
- US 62 / US 412 in Viola
- North end: Route E at the Missouri state line near Moody, MO

Location
- Country: United States
- State: Arkansas
- Counties: Fulton, Izard

Highway system
- Arkansas Highway System; Interstate; US; State; Business; Spurs; Suffixed; Scenic; Heritage
← AR 222	→ AR 224

Arkansas Highway 223 (AR 223, Hwy. 223) is a north–south state highway in north Arkansas. The route of 29.92 miles (48.15 km) runs from Highway 56 in Calico Rock north across US Route 62/US Route 412 (US 62/US 412) to Missouri Supplemental Route E (SSR-E) at the Missouri state line.

== Route description ==
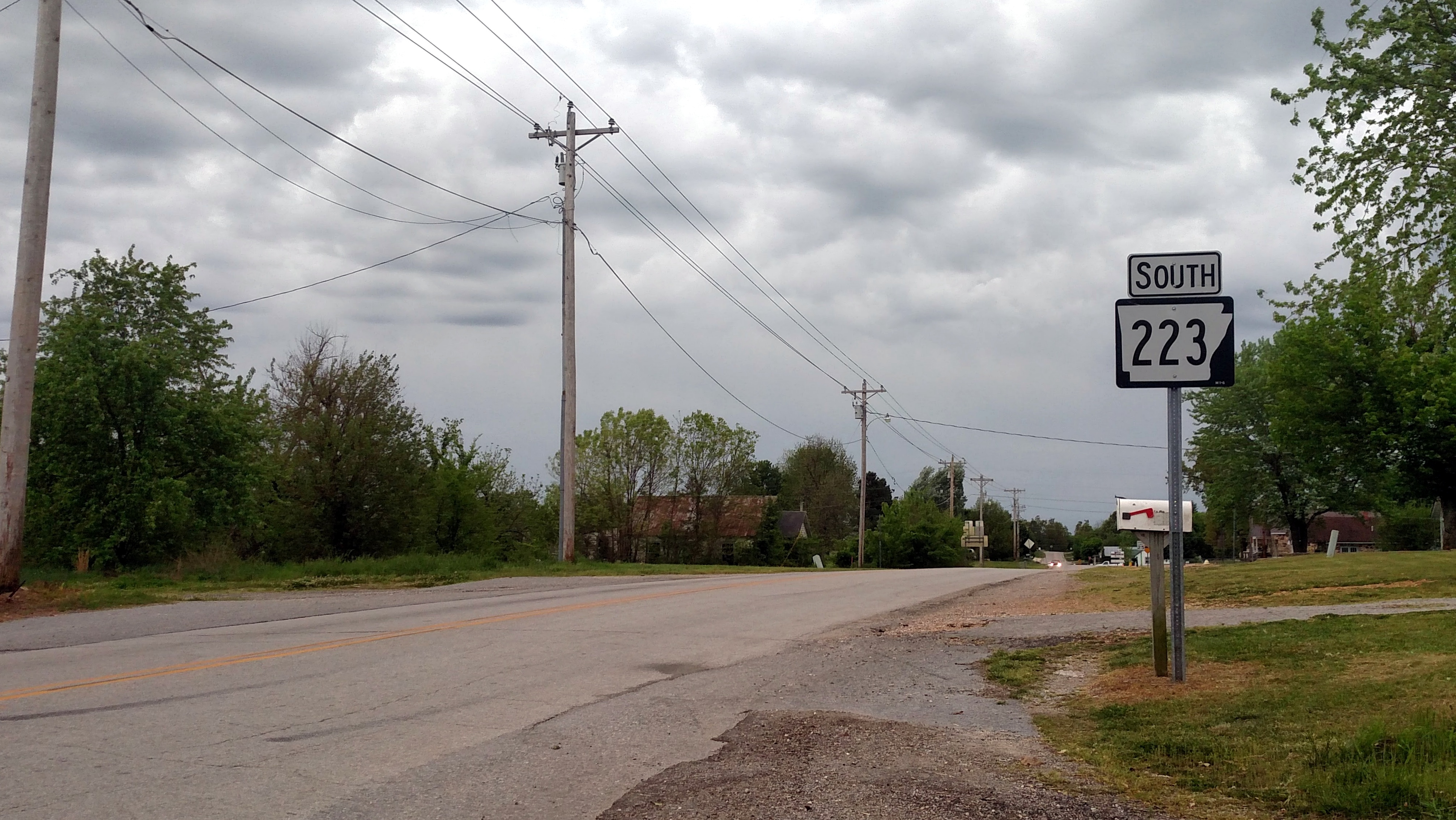
Highway 223 in Viola

AR 223 begins in Calico Rock at Highway 56. The route runs north to meet the southern terminus of Highway 177 in Pineville. The route continues north to meet US 62/US 412 in Viola in Fulton County, after which it continues north to the Missouri state line where the route extends as Missouri supplemental route E.

== Major intersections ==
County	Location	mi	km	Destinations	Notes
Izard	Calico Rock	0.00	0.00	AR 56 – Brockwell, Calico Rock	Southern terminus
Izard	Pineville	1.09	1.75	AR 177 north	
Fulton	Viola	21.90	35.24	US 62 (Seay Street) / US 412 – Mountain Home, Salem	
Missouri state line		29.92	48.15	Route E – Moody	Northern terminus
1.000 mi = 1.609 km; 1.000 km = 0.621 mi
