= Arkansas Highway 178 (1940s) =

Former state highway in Arkansas, United States

State Road 178

Route information
- Length: 3 mi (4.8 km)
- Existed: c. 1945–1952

Major junctions
- West end: AR 5
- East end: AR 177 at Ellis

Location
- Country: United States
- State: Arkansas
- Counties: Baxter

Highway system
- Arkansas Highway System; Interstate; US; State; Business; Spurs; Suffixed; Scenic; Heritage
← AR 177	→ AR 179

State Road 178 (AR 178, Ark. 178, and Hwy. 178) is a former state highway in Baxter County, Arkansas. It was maintained by the Arkansas Highway Department, now known as the Arkansas Department of Transportation (ArDOT).

== Major intersections ==
The entire route was in Baxter County.

Location	mi	km	Destinations	Notes
	0	0.0	AR 5	Western terminus
Ellis	3	4.8	AR 177	Eastern terminus
1.000 mi = 1.609 km; 1.000 km = 0.621 mi

== History ==
The highway first appeared on the 1945 state highway map, though did not appear on the prior map in 1941. Maps were not created in the interim during World War II. The road had been replaced by a rerouted State Road 5 on the March 1953 map.

== See also ==
- List of state highways in Arkansas
