= Kittle, Arkansas =

- Unincorporated community
- Location within Arkansas Location within the United States
- Coordinates: 36°16′0″N 91°37′42″W
- Country: United States
- State: Arkansas
- County: Fulton
- Township: Pleasant Ridge
- Elevation: 755 ft (230 m)
- Time zone: UTC-6 (Central (CST))
  - Summer (DST): UTC-5 (CDT)
- Area code: 870
- GNIS feature ID: 58023

Kittle is an unincorporated community in southeastern Fulton County, Arkansas, United States. The community is located on Arkansas Highway 289, just north of U.S. Route 412. The west end of the Cherokee Village is just to the northeast.
