= Melbourne High School (disambiguation) =

Melbourne High School may refer to the following high schools:

- Melbourne High School (Victoria), Australia
- Melbourne High School (Arkansas), USA
- Melbourne High School (Melbourne, Florida), USA
- Melbourne Central Catholic High School, Melbourne, Florida, USA
