= Arkansas Highway 177 =

State highway in Arkansas, United States

Highway 177

Route information
- Maintained by ArDOT
- Length: 16.20 mi (26.07 km)

Major junctions
- West end: Shield Lane at Herron
- AR 5 in Norfork
- East end: AR 223 in Pineville

Location
- Country: United States
- State: Arkansas
- Counties: Izard, Baxter

Highway system
- Arkansas Highway System; Interstate; US; State; Business; Spurs; Suffixed; Scenic; Heritage
← AR 176	→ AR 178

Highway 177 (AR 177, Ark. 177, and Hwy. 177) is a north–south state highway that runs in north central Arkansas. The route runs 16.20 miles (26.07 km) from Herron north over the Norfork Dam, then south to Pineville.

== Route description ==
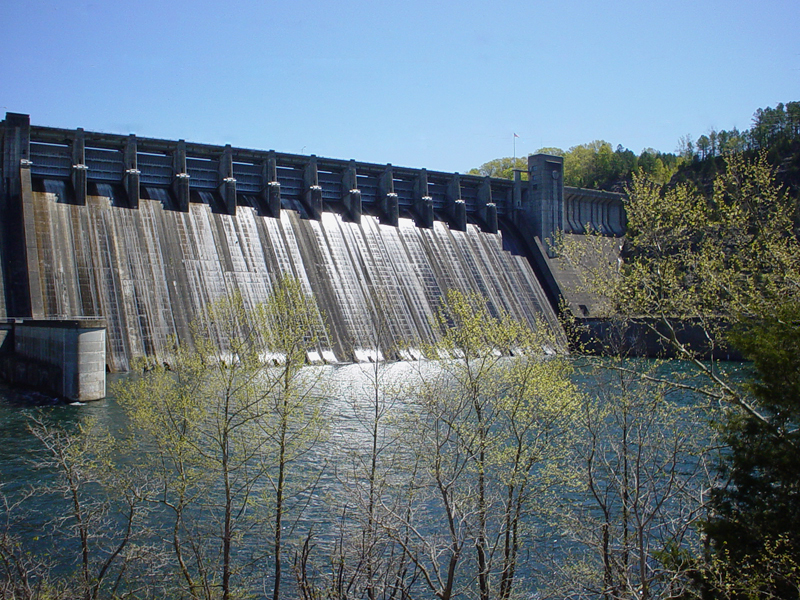
The roadway on top of the Norfork Dam is AR 177.

AR 177 begins in Herron and heads north to meet AR 5 in Norfork. It concurs with AR 5 north until Salesville. North of Salesville, AR 177 serves the Norfork National Fish Hatchery, the Quarry Cove Use Area, and bridges the Norfork Dam. The route turns south to pass through Jordan and Iuka before terminating at AR 223 in Pineville. AR 177 is a 2-lane paved highway for its entire length.

== Major intersections ==
Mile markers reset at concurrencies.

County	Location	mi	km	Destinations	Notes
Baxter	Herron	0.0	0.0	Shield Ln	
Baxter	Norfork	3.00	4.83	AR 5 south – Calico Rock, Mountain Home	
Baxter	AR 5 concurrency north, 4.9 miles (7.9 km)				
Baxter	Salesville	0.0	0.0	AR 5 north – Mountain Home	
Norfork Dam		2.56	4.12	Bridge over Norfork Dam	
Izard	Pineville	13.20	21.24	AR 223 – Bexar, Viola, Calico Rock	
1.000 mi = 1.609 km; 1.000 km = 0.621 mi
