= Caney Springs Cumberland Presbyterian Church =

Historic church in Arkansas, United States

- U.S. National Register of Historic Places
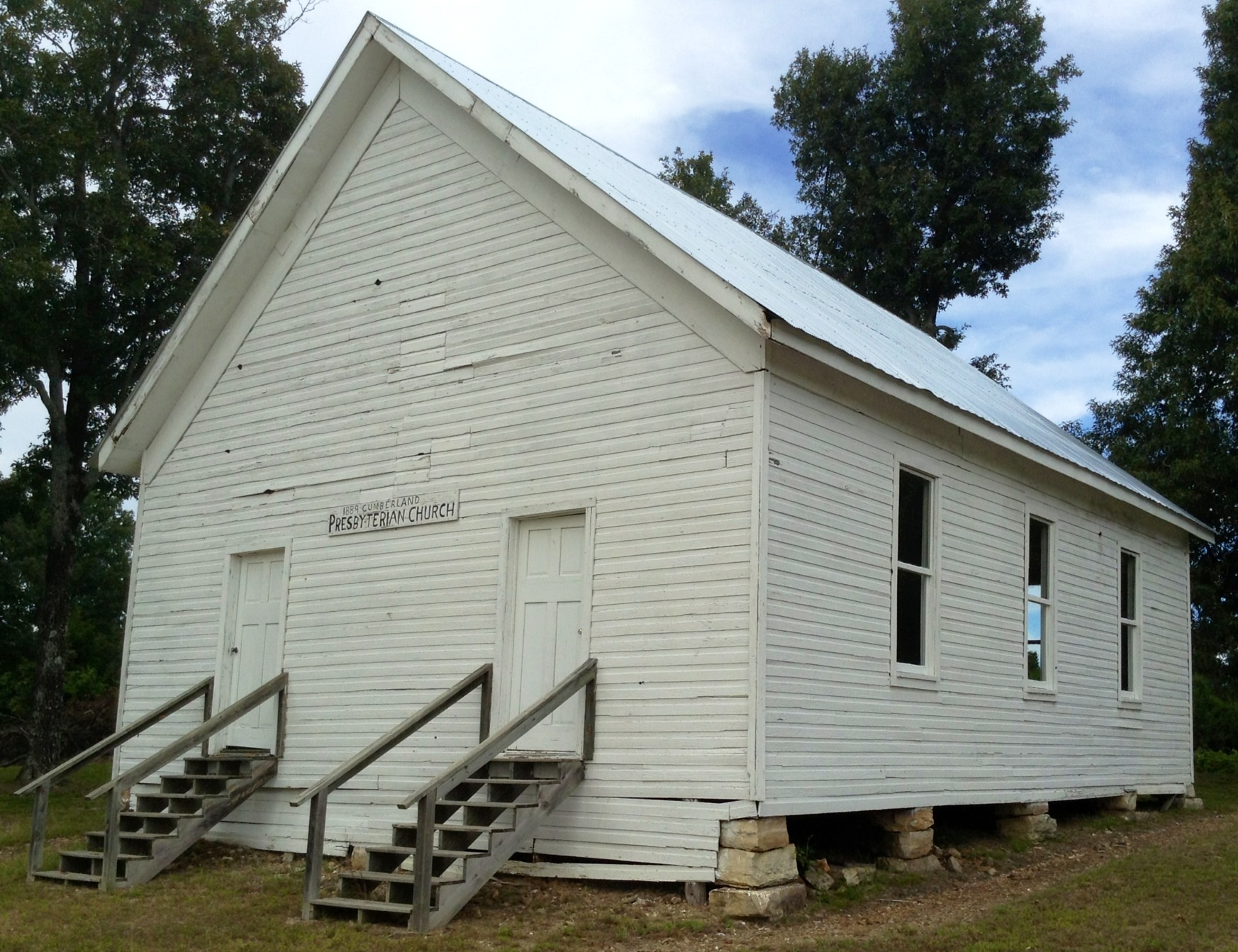

- Location within Arkansas Location within the United States
- Nearest city: Sage, Arkansas
- Coordinates: 36°3′40″N 91°49′9″W
- Area: less than one acre
- Architectural style: Plain Traditional
- NRHP reference No.: 95000693
- Added to NRHP: June 9, 1995

Caney Springs Cumberland Presbyterian Church is a historic church at the junction of Arkansas Highway 289 and Izard County Road 70 (Walter Hall Road), near Sage, Arkansas. It is a modest rectangular Plain Traditional structure set on fieldstone piers and topped by a gabled corrugated metal roof. The interior has a single large room, with plank flooring and flush-boarded walls. The pews, original to the building's 1889 construction, were handcrafted by the congregation. The church is a well-preserved example of a once-common type of church found in the region.

The building was listed on the National Register of Historic Places in 1995.

== See also ==
- National Register of Historic Places listings in Izard County, Arkansas
