= Izard County Consolidated High School =

Izard County Stem High School
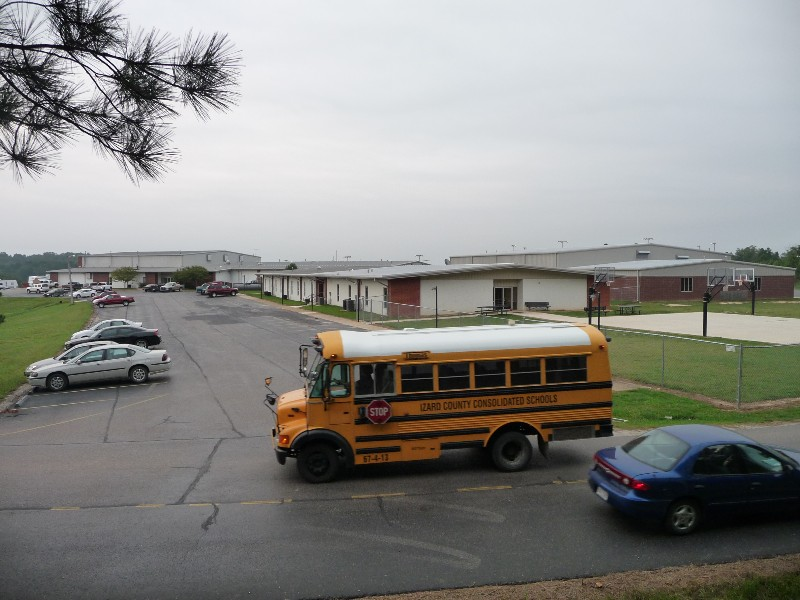

Location
- PO Box 115 Highway 9 North; Brockwell, Arkansas 72517; United States; 36°9′17″N 91°55′24″W

Information
- School type: Public
- Motto: Every child, every day, whatever it takes.
- Founded: 1985 (41 years ago)
- School board: Izard County Consolidated School District
- Superintendent: Fred Walker
- CEEB code: 042540
- NCES School ID: 050002101300
- Principal: Billy McBride
- Staff: 27.89 (on FTE basis)
- Grades: 9–12
- Enrollment: 191 (2023–2024)
- Student to teacher ratio: 6.85
- Colors: Black and grey
- Athletics conference: 1A 2 North (2012–14)
- Mascot: Cougar
- Nickname: Cougars
- Team name: Izard County Cougars ICC Lady Cougars
- Website: www.icc.k12.ar.us

Izard County Stem High School (or ICS High School) is a comprehensive public high school located in Brockwell, Arkansas, United States. This Izard County-based school was established in 1985 and serves grades 9 through 12 in the Izard County Consolidated School District.

Izard County Stem High School is frequently hosts foreign exchange students. Students from various countries, such as the Czech Republic, Germany, Austria, Switzerland, Hungary, Italy, Mexico, Brazil, South Korea, Denmark, Japan or elsewhere, this program is said to help American students to develop international relations. It also helps to better understand foreign nationalities and their habits.

== Academics ==
ICC High School is accredited by the Arkansas Department of Education (ADE) and has been accredited by AdvancED since 1992. The assumed course of study follows the Smart Core curriculum developed by the ADE. Students complete regular (core and elective) and career focus coursework and exams and may take Advanced Placement (AP) courses and exams with the opportunity to receive college credit. The school currently offers 2 AP courses: AP Biology and AP English Language and Composition.

== Extracurricular activities ==
The Izard County Consolidated High School mascot and athletic emblem is the Cougar, named Rowdy, with black and gray serving as the school colors. Rowdy is currently played by Harrison Oss.

=== Athletics ===
The ICC Cougars compete in interscholastic activities within the 2A Classification via the 2A 2 North Conference, as administered by the Arkansas Activities Association. The Cougars participate in volleyball, bowling (boys'/girls'), golf (boys'/girls'), cross country (boys'/girls'), basketball (boys'/girls'), baseball, softball, and track and field (boys'/girls'). The school formally offered cheer.

The boys' basketball team won the Class 1A state championship in 2008 and had an overall record of 35-6 including a 26–0 record against Class 2A teams. The girls' golf team was regional champions and state runner-up in 2009 and had two players named all-state. The boys' golf team also had a player named all-state in 2009. The boys' baseball team was regional champions in 2008 and the softball team was regional runner-up in 2009. In 2008, the high school had 15 players named to an all-state team in boys' basketball, girls' basketball, baseball, softball, boys' golf, girls' golf, and girls' cross country.

=== Clubs and traditions ===
According to the school's website, the high school chess team has won the Class 1A-2A state chess championship seven times, most recently in 2008. The high school Quiz Bowl team has won one state championship (1995) and has been state runner-up twice (2001, 2002). The Quiz Bowl team qualified for the state championship in the 2023-2024 school year. The team was regional champions in 2009. The junior high team won the Class 1A state championship trophy in 2008.

The Livestock Show Team competes in the area county and district livestock.
