= Dolph, Arkansas =

- Unincorporated community
- Location within Arkansas Location within the United States
- Coordinates: 36°13′42″N 92°06′46″W
- Country: United States
- State: Arkansas
- County: Izard
- Elevation: 883 ft (269 m)
- Time zone: UTC-6 (Central (CST))
  - Summer (DST): UTC-5 (CDT)
- ZIP code: 72528
- Area code: 870
- GNIS feature ID: 57671

Dolph is an unincorporated community in Izard County, Arkansas, United States. Dolph is 4.5 miles (7.2 km) north of Pineville. Dolph has a post office with ZIP code 72528.
