= Painters Bluff =

Cliff on the White River in Arkansas, United States

Coordinates: 35°52′48″N 91°51′10″W

Painters Bluff is a cliff on the White River in southern Izard County, Arkansas, United States. The elevation of Painters Bluff is 764 feet (233 m). The bluff rises above the north bank of the White River about one half mile east of the riverside community of Crocker. The river below the bluff is at an elevation of 280 feet.

Variant names were "Painter Bluff" and "Penters Bluff". According to tradition, the bluff was named after the local Penter family.
