= Lunenburg, Arkansas =

Unincorporated community in Arkansas, US

Coordinates: 36°00′09″N 91°54′28″W

Lunenburg is a small unincorporated community in Izard County, Arkansas, United States. It lies between Guion and Melbourne.
