= Calico Rock High School =

Location
- 1 Pirate Place; Calico Rock, Arkansas 72519; United States
- Coordinates: 36°7′21″N 92°7′34″W

Information
- School type: Public comprehensive
- Status: Open
- School district: Calico Rock School District
- CEEB code: 040340
- NCES School ID: 050384000132
- Teaching staff: 29.88 (on FTE basis)
- Grades: 7–12
- Enrollment: 185 (2023-2024)
- Student to teacher ratio: 6.19
- Education system: ADE Smart Core
- Classes offered: Regular, Advanced Placement (AP)
- Colors: Black and orange
- Athletics: Golf, cross country, basketball, baseball, softball
- Athletics conference: 1A 2 North
- Mascot: Pirates
- Team name: Calico Rock Pirates
- Accreditation: ADE
- Website: pirates.k12.ar.us/high-school

Calico Rock High School is an accredited public high school located in the rural community of Calico Rock, Arkansas, United States. The school provides comprehensive secondary education for more than 175 students each year in grades 7 through 12. It is one of four public high schools in Izard County, Arkansas, and the only high school administered by the Calico Rock School District.

== Academics ==
Calico Rock High School is accredited by the Arkansas Department of Education (ADE). The assumed course of study follows the Smart Core curriculum developed by the ADE. Students complete regular (core and elective) and career focus coursework and exams and may take Advanced Placement (AP) courses and exams with the opportunity to receive college credit.

== Athletics ==
The Calico Rock High School mascot and athletic emblem is the Pirate, with orange and black serving as the school colors.

For 2012–2014, the Calico Rock Pirates competed in interscholastic activities within the 1A Classification from the 1A 2 North Conference (and 3A Region 1 East Conference for basketball), as administered by the Arkansas Activities Association. The Pirates participate in golf (boys/girls), cross country (boys/girls), basketball (boys/girls), baseball, and softball.

== Alumni ==
- Vada Sheid, state legislator in Arkansas
