= Violet Hill, Arkansas =

- Census-designated place
- Location within Arkansas Location within the United States
- Coordinates: 36°09′13″N 91°50′30″W
- Country: United States
- State: Arkansas
- County: Izard
- Elevation: 758 ft (231 m)

Population (2020)
  - Total: 36
- Time zone: UTC-6 (Central (CST))
  - Summer (DST): UTC-5 (CDT)
- ZIP code: 72584
- Area code: 870
- GNIS feature ID: 2805692

Violet Hill is an unincorporated community and census-designated place (CDP) in Izard County, Arkansas, United States. Violet Hill is located on Arkansas Highway 56, 4 miles (6.4 km) west-southwest of Franklin. Violet Hill has a post office with ZIP code 72584. It was first listed as a CDP in the 2020 census with a population of 36.

It is a part of the Izard County Consolidated School District. It was served by the Violet Hill School District until it consolidated into Izard County consolidated on July 1, 1985.

== Demographics ==
Historical population
Census	Pop.	Note	%±
2020	36		—
U.S. Decennial Census; 2020

=== 2020 census ===
Violet Hill CDP, Arkansas – Demographic Profile (NH = Non-Hispanic) Note: the US Census treats Hispanic/Latino as an ethnic category. This table excludes Latinos from the racial categories and assigns them to a separate category. Hispanics/Latinos may be of any race.
Race / Ethnicity	Pop 2020	% 2020
White alone (NH)	33	91.67%
Black or African American alone (NH)	0	0.00%
Native American or Alaska Native alone (NH)	0	0.00%
Asian alone (NH)	1	2.78%
Pacific Islander alone (NH)	0	0.00%
Some Other Race alone (NH)	0	0.00%
Mixed Race/Multi-Racial (NH)	2	5.56%
Hispanic or Latino (any race)	0	0.00%
Total	36	100.00%
