= Mount Pleasant, Arkansas =

- Town
- Location of Mount Pleasant in Izard County, Arkansas
- Coordinates: 35°58′45″N 91°46′2″W
- Country: United States
- State: Arkansas
- County: Izard

Area
  - Total: 3.52 sq mi (9.11 km^{2})
  - Land: 3.50 sq mi (9.07 km^{2})
  - Water: 0.015 sq mi (0.04 km^{2})
- Elevation: 686 ft (209 m)

Population (2020)
  - Total: 353
  - Estimate (2025): 383 ▲
  - Density: 100.8/sq mi (38.92/km^{2})
- Time zone: UTC-6 (Central (CST))
  - Summer (DST): UTC-5 (CDT)
- ZIP code: 72561
- Area code: 870
- FIPS code: 05-47900
- GNIS feature ID: 2406210
- Website: mountpleasantar.org

Mount Pleasant is a town in Izard County, Arkansas, United States. As of the 2020 census, the town population was 353.

== Geography ==
Mount Pleasant is located in southeastern Izard County at 35°58′45″N 91°46′2″W (35.979214, -91.767344).

According to the United States Census Bureau, the town has a total area of 3.34 square miles (8.66 km^{2}), of which 3.33 square miles (8.63 km^{2}) are land and 0.02 square miles (0.04 km^{2}), or 0.43%, are water.

=== Highway ===
- Arkansas Highway 69

== Demographics ==
Historical population
Census	Pop.	Note	%±
1970	346		—
1980	438		26.6%
1990	422		−3.7%
2000	401		−5.0%
2010	414		3.2%
2020	353		−14.7%
2025 (est.)	383	▲	8.5%
U.S. Decennial Census

As of the census of 2000, there were 401 people, 166 households, and 113 families residing in the town. The population density was 44.7/km^{2} (115.8/mi^{2}). There were 182 housing units at an average density of 20.3/km^{2} (52.6/mi^{2}). The racial makeup of the town was 99.25% White, 0.25% Asian, and 0.50% from two or more races. 1.50% of the population were Hispanic or Latino of any race.

There were 166 households, out of which 37.3% had children under the age of 18 living with them, 52.4% were married couples living together, 11.4% had a female householder with no husband present, and 31.9% were non-families. 28.3% of all households were made up of individuals, and 15.7% had someone living alone who was 65 years of age or older. The average household size was 2.42 and the average family size was 3.00.

In the town, the population was spread out, with 30.2% under the age of 18, 6.5% from 18 to 24, 27.9% from 25 to 44, 23.2% from 45 to 64, and 12.2% who were 65 years of age or older. The median age was 35 years. For every 100 females, there were 91.9 males. For every 100 females age 18 and over, there were 84.2 males.

The median income for a household in the town was $21,875, and the median income for a family was $29,286. Males had a median income of $22,115 versus $17,250 for females. The per capita income for the town was $11,014. About 16.7% of families and 21.5% of the population were below the poverty line, including 20.7% of those under age 18 and 52.2% of those age 65 or over.

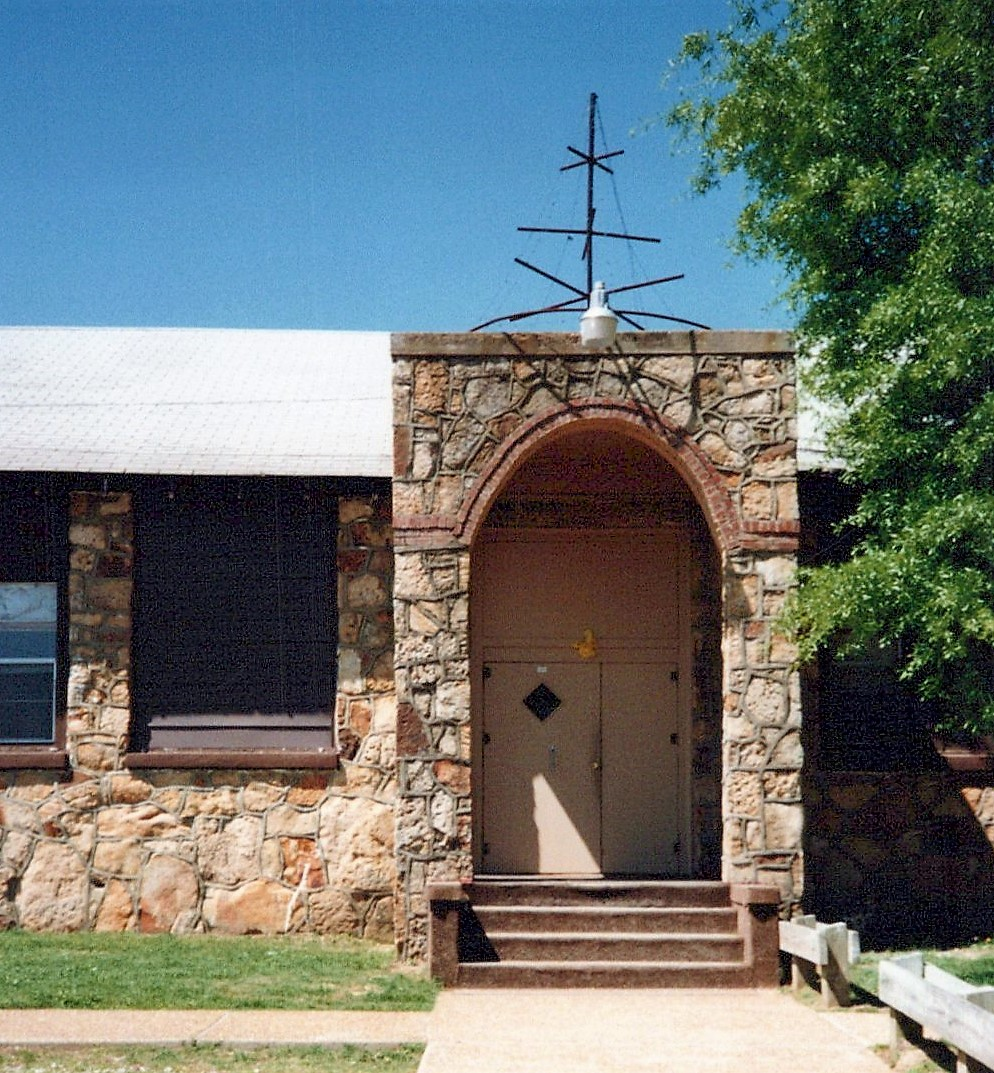
Mount Pleasant High School 1991

== Education ==
Public education for elementary and secondary school students is provided by the Melbourne School District that includes the Mount Pleasant Elementary School, which received top honor of being named a 2009 National Blue Ribbon School by the U.S. Department of Education (ED). Students completing their studies graduate from Melbourne High School.

On July 1, 2004, the Mount Pleasant School District was merged into the Melbourne School District.

In 2016, Mt. Pleasant Elementary School officially shut down.
