= Viola High School =

Location
- 314 Longhorn Way; Viola, Arkansas 72583; United States
- Coordinates: 36°23′43″N 91°59′6″W

Information
- School type: Public comprehensive
- Status: Open
- School district: Viola School District
- Superintendent: Kyle McCarn
- CEEB code: 042535
- NCES School ID: 05136001112
- Principal: Jared Johnson
- Faculty: 40.78
- Grades: 7–12
- Enrollment: 177 (2023–2024)
- Student to teacher ratio: 4.34
- Education system: ADE Smart Core
- Classes offered: Regular, Advanced Placement (AP)
- Colors: Black and orange
- Athletics conference: 1A 2 (2012–14)
- Sports: Basketball, Baseball, Softball
- Mascot: Longhorn
- Team name: Viola Longhorns
- Accreditation: ADE
- Website: www.violaschool.k12.ar.us/page/high-school-home

Viola High School is a comprehensive public high school located in Viola, Arkansas, United States. It is one of three public high schools in Fulton County and the sole high school administered by Viola School District. For the 2023–24 school year, the school provided secondary education for 177 students in grades 7 through 12 and employed more than 40 educators.

== Academics ==
The assumed course of study for Viola students follows the SMART Core curriculum developed by the Arkansas Department of Education (ADE), which requires students to complete 22 units prior to graduation. Students complete regular coursework and exams and may elect to take Advanced Placement (AP) courses and exams with the opportunity for college credit. The school is accredited by the ADE. The school also offers online concurrent credit courses in partnership with Ozarka College.

== Athletics ==
The Viola High School athletic emblem and mascot is the Longhorn with black and orange serving as the school colors.

The Viola Longhorns compete in interscholastic activities within the 1A Classification—the state's smallest classification—via the 1A Region 2 Conference administered by the Arkansas Activities Association. The Longhorns compete in golf (boys), basketball (boys/girls), baseball, softball, and cross country (boys/girls).

- Basketball: The girls basketball team are 2-time state basketball champions (1959, 1961). The boys basketball team are 3-time state basketball champions with wins in 1957, 2002, and 2021.
- Baseball: The baseball team is 4-time List of Arkansas state high school baseball champions (1998, 1999, 2019, 2021).
- FIRST Robotics: Mechanically Challenged was in the winning alliance for the Arkansas Regional Robotics competition (2025) and also a member of the second place alliance (2022).

== Notable alumni ==
- Preacher Roe - Former MLB Player (St. Louis Cardinals, Pittsburgh Pirates, Brooklyn Dodgers)
