= Forty Four, Arkansas =

Unincorporated community in Arkansas, US

Coordinates: 36°08′37″N 92°03′40″W

Forty Four is an unincorporated community in Izard County, Arkansas, United States.

The community was named for the 44 local signators who petitioned in order to secure the town a post office.
