= AR 289 Bridge Over English Creek =

- Formerly listed on the U.S. National Register of Historic Places
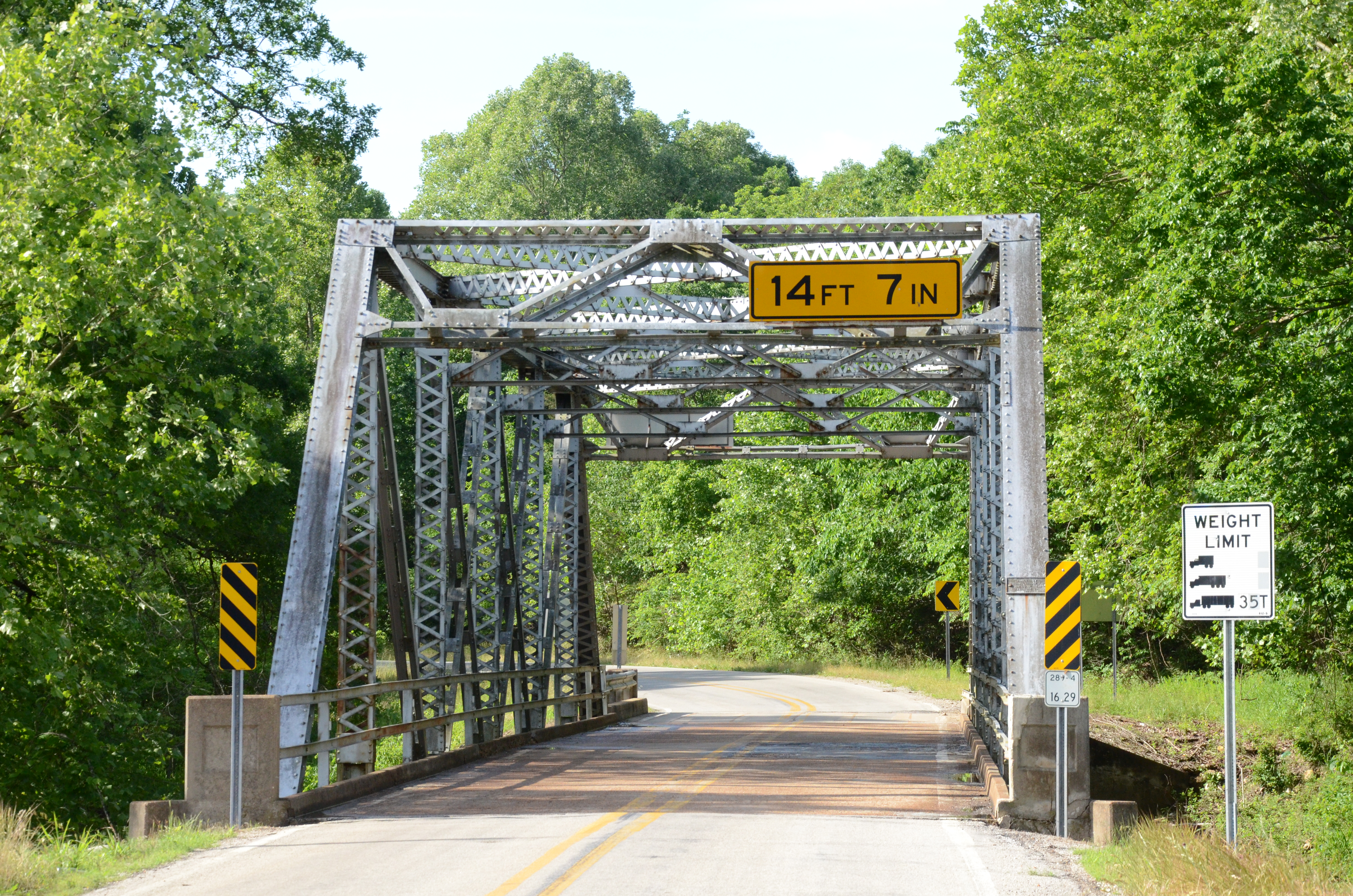

- Location within Arkansas Location within the United States
- Nearest city: Mammoth Spring, Arkansas
- Coordinates: 36°26′48″N 91°34′1″W
- Area: less than one acre
- Built: 1929
- Architect: Virginia Bridge & Iron Co.
- Architectural style: Pratt through-truss
- MPS: Historic Bridges of Arkansas MPS
- NRHP reference No.: 08001338

Significant dates
- Added to NRHP: January 22, 2009
- Removed from NRHP: September 1, 2022

The AR 289 Bridge Over English Creek is a historic bridge in rural eastern Fulton County, Arkansas. The bridge, a single-span steel Pratt through-truss structure, carries Arkansas Highway 289 over English Creek south of Mammoth Spring. The span is 122 feet (37 m) long and 20 feet (6.1 m) wide, and rests on concrete abutments. Built in 1929 by the Virginia Bridge and Iron Company, it is important as a well-preserved example of its type in Fulton County, and for its historical role in transportation in the region.

The bridge was listed on the National Register of Historic Places in 2009, and was delisted in 2022.

== See also ==
- National Register of Historic Places listings in Fulton County, Arkansas
- List of bridges on the National Register of Historic Places in Arkansas
