= Viola, Arkansas =

Town in Arkansas, US

- Town
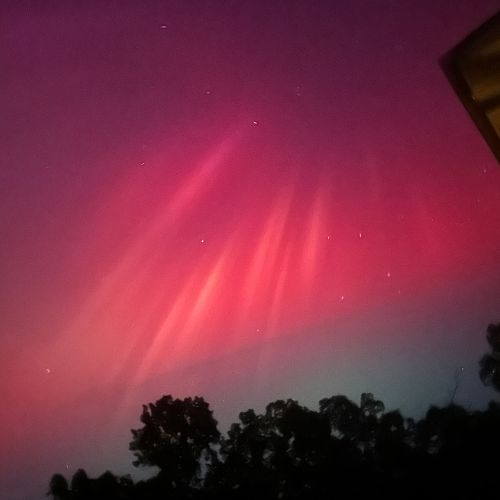
- May 2024 solar storms over Viola

- Location of Viola in Fulton County, Arkansas
- Coordinates: 36°23′48″N 91°59′11″W
- Country: United States
- State: Arkansas
- County: Fulton

Area
  - Total: 1.58 sq mi (4.08 km^{2})
  - Land: 1.57 sq mi (4.07 km^{2})
  - Water: 0.0039 sq mi (0.01 km^{2})
- Elevation: 879 ft (268 m)

Population (2020)
  - Total: 358
  - Estimate (2025): 371 ▲
  - Density: 227.9/sq mi (87.99/km^{2})
- Time zone: UTC-6 (Central (CST))
  - Summer (DST): UTC-5 (CDT)
- ZIP code: 72583
- Area code: 870
- FIPS code: 05-72140
- GNIS feature ID: 2406804

Viola is a town in Fulton County, Arkansas, United States. The population was 358 at the 2020 census, up from 337 in 2010.

== Geography ==
Viola is located in western Fulton County at 36°23′50″N 91°59′0″W, along U.S. Routes 62/412. The combined highways lead east 10 miles (16 km) to Salem, the county seat, and west 26 miles (42 km) to Mountain Home. Arkansas Highway 223 crosses US 62/412 in the center of Viola, leading north 8 miles (13 km) to the Missouri border and south 9 miles (14 km) to Bexar.

According to the United States Census Bureau, the town of Viola has a total area of 1.3 square miles (3.4 km^{2}), all land.

== Demographics ==
Historical population
Census	Pop.	Note	%±
2000	381		—
2010	337		−11.5%
2020	358		6.2%
2025 (est.)	371	▲	3.6%
U.S. Decennial Census

=== 2020 census ===
Viola racial composition
Race	Number	Percentage
White (non-Hispanic)	328	91.62%
Black or African American (non-Hispanic)	2	0.56%
Native American	6	1.68%
Other/mixed	22	6.15%

As of the 2020 United States census, there were 358 people, 136 households, and 75 families residing in the town.

=== 2000 census ===
As of the census of 2000, there were 381 people, 160 households, and 106 families residing in the town. The population density was 295.2 inhabitants per square mile (114.0/km^{2}). There were 181 housing units at an average density of 140.2 per square mile (54.1/km^{2}). The racial makeup of the town was 98.69% White, 0.26% Black or African American, and 1.05% from two or more races. 0.79% of the population were Hispanic or Latino of any race.

There were 160 households, out of which 29.4% had children under the age of 18 living with them, 53.8% were married couples living together, 7.5% had a female householder with no husband present, and 33.8% were non-families. 31.9% of all households were made up of individuals, and 18.8% had someone living alone who was 65 years of age or older. The average household size was 2.38 and the average family size was 2.97.

In the town, the population was spread out, with 25.2% under the age of 18, 10.8% from 18 to 24, 22.0% from 25 to 44, 22.8% from 45 to 64, and 19.2% who were 65 years of age or older. The median age was 37 years. For every 100 females there were 77.2 males. For every 100 females age 18 and over, there were 78.1 males.

The median income for a household in the town was $26,667, and the median income for a family was $31,094. Males had a median income of $23,750 versus $21,875 for females. The per capita income for the town was $12,953. About 2.9% of families and 7.2% of the population were below the poverty line, including 4.0% of those under age 18 and 11.7% of those age 65 or over.

== Education ==
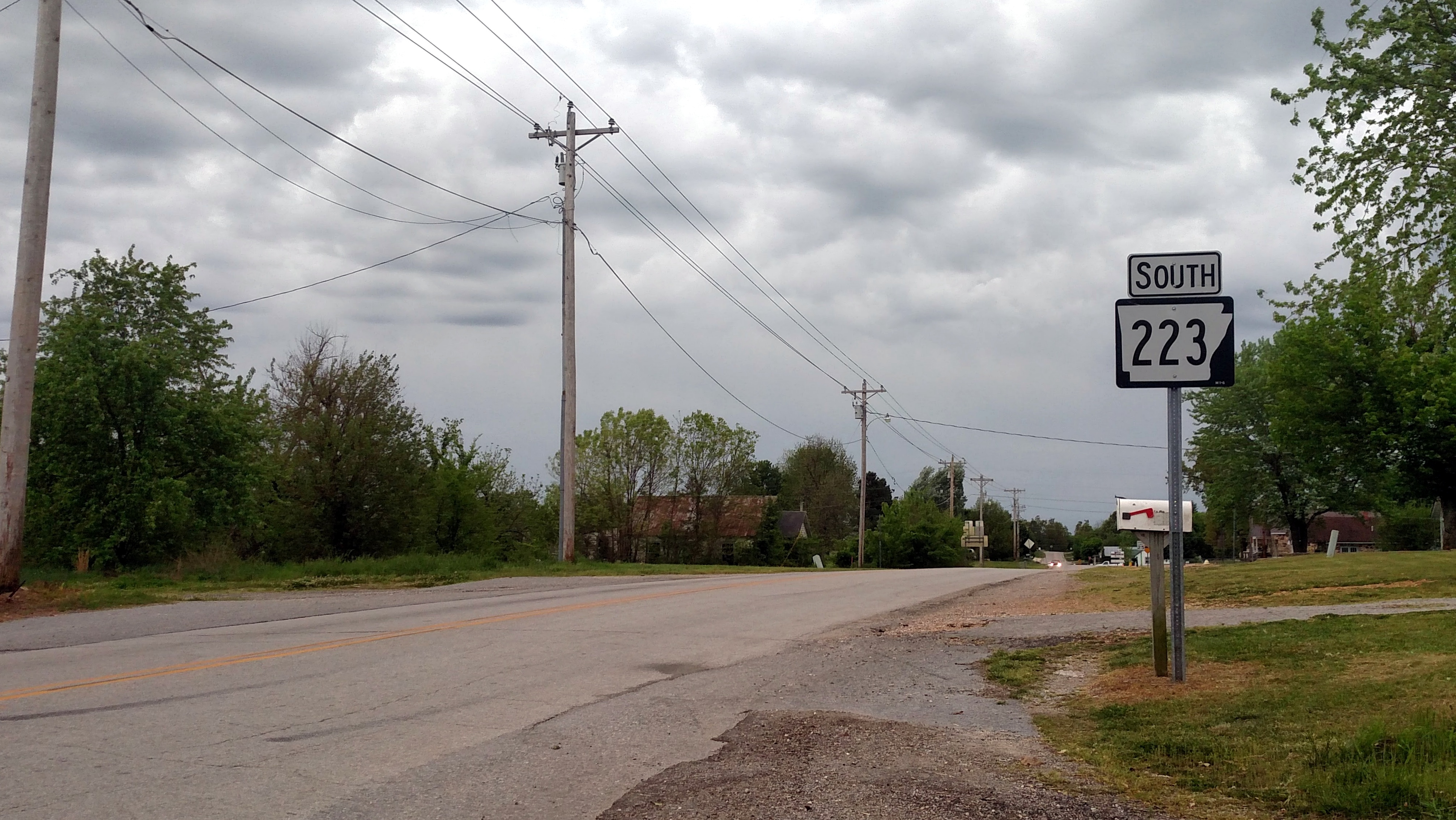

=== Public education ===
Public education for elementary and secondary school students is primarily provided by the Viola School District, which leads to graduation from Viola High School.

=== Public library ===
The Viola Public Library is one of the fourteen branch libraries of the White River Regional Library system.

== Notable people ==
- Preacher Roe, former MLB pitcher
- Max Sherman, former Texas State Senator and former president of West Texas A&M University
