= Mount Pleasant School District =

Defunct school district in Arkansas, United States

Mount Pleasant School District (MPSD) was a school district headquartered in Mount Pleasant, Arkansas. It had a single school, the Mount Pleasant School.

On July 1, 2004, the Mount Pleasant School District was merged into the Melbourne School District.
