= Gid, Arkansas =

Unincorporated community in Arkansas, US

Coordinates: 35°58′47″N 91°51′24″W

Gid is an unincorporated community in Izard County, Arkansas, United States.

== History ==
Gid is the name of Gid Bruce. The community received its name in 1888 when promoters of a post office could not agree on a name, and so decided to name it for whoever walked in next.
