= Pine Ridge School Building =

- U.S. National Register of Historic Places
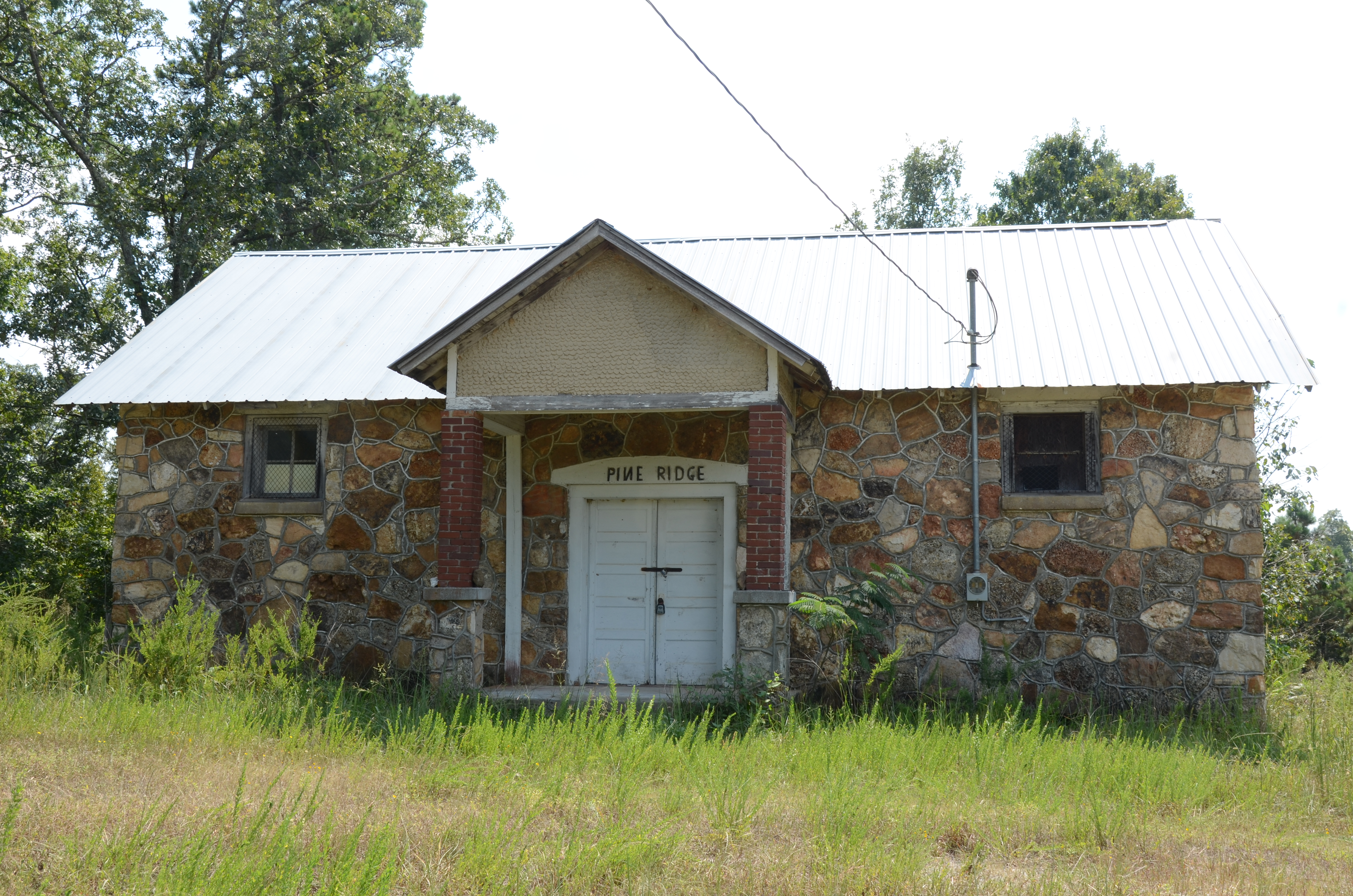

- Location within Arkansas Location within the United States
- Nearest city: Brockwell, Arkansas
- Coordinates: 36°8′44″N 91°56′5″W
- Area: 1 acre (0.40 ha)
- Architectural style: Plain traditional
- MPS: Public Schools in the Ozarks MPS
- NRHP reference No.: 94000161
- Added to NRHP: March 7, 1994

The Pine Ridge School Building is a historic school building in rural Izard County, Arkansas. It is a single-story fieldstone structure, located on the south side of Pine Ridge Road (County Road 32) about 0.5 miles (0.80 km) west of Brockwell. It was built c. 1920, fashioned out of uncoursed native sandstone with grapevine mortar joints. A central gable-roofed entrance portico extends from the center of the building's north facade. It is a fine local example of an early 20th-century one-room school building.

The building was listed on the National Register of Historic Places in 1994, at which time it was being used as a church by a local Seventh-day Adventist congregation.

== See also ==
- National Register of Historic Places listings in Izard County, Arkansas
