= Wideman, Arkansas =

- Unincorporated community
- Location within Arkansas Location within the United States
- Coordinates: 36°11′11″N 92°00′32″W
- Country: United States
- State: Arkansas
- County: Izard
- Elevation: 604 ft (184 m)
- Time zone: UTC-6 (Central (CST))
  - Summer (DST): UTC-5 (CDT)
- ZIP code: 72585
- Area code: 870
- GNIS feature ID: 58880

Wideman is an unincorporated community in Izard County, Arkansas, United States. Wideman is 5 miles (8.0 km) west-southwest of Oxford. Wideman has a post office with ZIP code 72585.

It is within the Calico Rock School District.
