= Arkansas Highway 353 =

State highway in Arkansas, United States

Highway 353

Route information
- Maintained by ArDOT
- Length: 1.09 mi (1.75 km)
- Existed: November 23, 1966–present

Major junctions
- South end: US 67 near Hope
- North end: CR 2 / CR 15 at Guernsey

Location
- Country: United States
- State: Arkansas
- Counties: Hempstead

Highway system
- Arkansas Highway System; Interstate; US; State; Business; Spurs; Suffixed; Scenic; Heritage
← AR 352	→ AR 354

Highway 353 (AR 353, Ark. 353, and Hwy. 353) is a north–south state highway in Hempstead County, Arkansas. The highway serves as a connector between US Highway 67 and the community of Guernsey across Interstate 30 (I-30). The highway is maintained by the Arkansas State Highway and Transportation Department (AHTD).

== Route description ==
The highway begins at US 67 west of Hope in the Arkansas Timberlands. Highway 353 runs northwest along an overpass over I-30 to a crossroads at Guernsey, where it terminates. The highway does not provide access to I-30.

The southern terminus of Highway 353 is a former AHTD weigh station.

== History ==
The highway was created by the Arkansas State Highway Commission on November 23, 1966. The routing not changed since creation.

== Major intersections ==
The entire route is in Hempstead County.

Location	mi	km	Destinations	Notes
	0.00	0.00	US 67 – Hope, Texarkana	Southern terminus
Guernsey	1.09	1.75	CR 2 / CR 15 north	Northern terminus
1.000 mi = 1.609 km; 1.000 km = 0.621 mi
