= Oxford, Arkansas =

- City
- Location of Oxford in Izard County, Arkansas
- Coordinates: 36°13′3″N 91°55′8″W
- Country: United States
- State: Arkansas
- County: Izard

Area
  - Total: 6.54 sq mi (16.95 km^{2})
  - Land: 6.54 sq mi (16.95 km^{2})
  - Water: 0 sq mi (0.00 km^{2})
- Elevation: 784 ft (239 m)

Population (2020)
  - Total: 573
  - Estimate (2025): 615 ▲
  - Density: 88/sq mi (33.8/km^{2})
- Time zone: UTC-6 (Central (CST))
  - Summer (DST): UTC-5 (CDT)
- ZIP code: 72565
- Area code: 870
- FIPS code: 05-52880
- GNIS feature ID: 2404452

Oxford is a city in Izard County, Arkansas, United States. As of the 2020 census, Oxford had a population of 573.

== Geography ==
Oxford is located in northern Izard County at 36°13′3″N 91°55′8″W (36.217573, -91.918875). Its northern border is the Fulton County line.

According to the United States Census Bureau, the city has a total area of 6.5 square miles (16.8 km^{2}), all land.

=== Highways ===
- Arkansas Highway 9
- Arkansas Highway 354

== Demographics ==
Historical population
Census	Pop.	Note	%±
1950	79		—
1960	191		141.8%
1970	271		41.9%
1980	520		91.9%
1990	562		8.1%
2000	642		14.2%
2010	670		4.4%
2020	573		−14.5%
2025 (est.)	615	▲	7.3%
U.S. Decennial Census

=== 2020 census ===
Oxford racial composition
Race	Number	Percentage
White (non-Hispanic)	511	89.18%
Black or African American (non-Hispanic)	4	0.7%
Native American	2	0.35%
Asian	1	0.17%
Other/Mixed	51	8.9%
Hispanic or Latino	4	0.7%

As of the 2020 United States census, there were 573 people, 265 households, and 179 families residing in the city.

=== 2000 census ===
As of the census of 2000, there were 642 people, 263 households, and 184 families residing in the city. The population density was 96.9 inhabitants per square mile (37.4/km^{2}). There were 309 housing units at an average density of 46.6 per square mile (18.0/km^{2}). The racial makeup of the city was 95.79% White, 0.16% Black or African American, 1.09% Native American, 0.47% from other races, and 2.49% from two or more races. 1.71% of the population were Hispanic or Latino of any race.

There were 263 households, out of which 30.0% had children under the age of 18 living with them, 57.0% were married couples living together, 9.5% had a female householder with no husband present, and 30.0% were non-families. 26.6% of all households were made up of individuals, and 13.7% had someone living alone who was 65 years of age or older. The average household size was 2.44 and the average family size was 2.96.

In the city, the population was spread out, with 24.5% under the age of 18, 7.9% from 18 to 24, 23.5% from 25 to 44, 23.5% from 45 to 64, and 20.6% who were 65 years of age or older. The median age was 42 years. For every 100 females, there were 98.1 males. For every 100 females age 18 and over, there were 90.9 males.

The median income for a household in the city was $22,313, and the median income for a family was $25,250. Males had a median income of $20,556 versus $20,385 for females. The per capita income for the city was $10,778. About 19.0% of families and 22.9% of the population were below the poverty line, including 25.6% of those under age 18 and 20.5% of those age 65 or over.

== Education ==
Oxford is a part of the Izard County Consolidated School District. It was served by the Oxford School District until it consolidated into Izard County on July 1, 1985.
