= John A. Cooper =

- Education: Brown University; Johns Hopkins University
- Scientific career
- Workplaces: Washington University in St. Louis

John Allen Cooper is an American biochemist. He is a professor of biochemistry and molecular biophysics and of cell biology and physiology at Washington University School of Medicine. He served as head of the university's Department of Biochemistry and Molecular Biophysics between 2015 and 2020 after leading the department as interim head.

Cooper earned his bachelor's degree in biochemistry magna cum laude from Brown University in 1977. He received medical and doctoral degrees from Johns Hopkins School of Medicine and Johns Hopkins University in 1982 and 1983, respectively. He joined Washington University in 1984 as a resident in anatomic pathology. In 2017, he became a fellow of the American Association for the Advancement of Science.
