= Poughkeepsie School Building =

- U.S. National Register of Historic Places
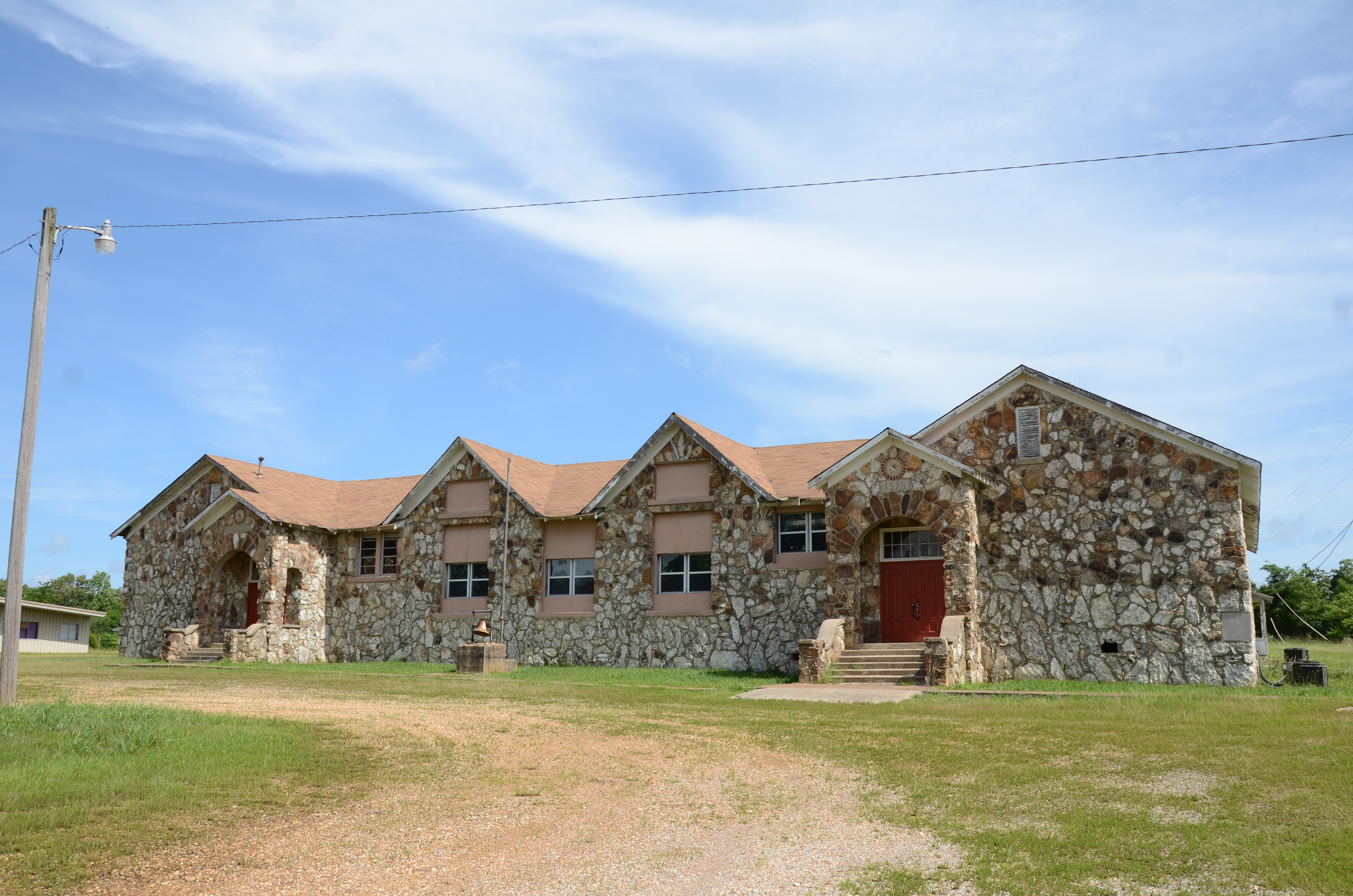

- Location within Arkansas Location within the United States
- Location: AR 58 S of Co. Rd. 137, Poughkeepsie, Arkansas
- Coordinates: 36°4′22″N 91°28′0″W
- Area: less than one acre
- Architectural style: Late 19th And Early 20th Century American Movements, Plain Traditional
- MPS: Public Schools in the Ozarks MPS
- NRHP reference No.: 92001198
- Added to NRHP: September 10, 1992

The Poughkeepsie School Building is a historic school building in Poughkeepsie, Arkansas, between Arkansas Highway 58 and Cherry Street. It is a single-story fieldstone building in the shape of an H, with front-gabled wings flanking a central horizontally-ridged section. The school was built in 1929–30, and is a well-preserved representative of a rural Arkansas stone school of the period.

The building was listed on the National Register of Historic Places in 1992, at which time it was still in use as a school.

== See also ==
- National Register of Historic Places listings in Sharp County, Arkansas
