= Calico Rock School District =

School district in Arkansas, United States

Address
- 301 College Street Calico Rock, Arkansas, 72519; United States

District information
- Type: Public
- Grades: K–12
- NCES District ID: 0503840

Students and staff
- Students: 362
- Teachers: 45.35
- Staff: 46.76
- Student–teacher ratio: 7.98

Other information
- Website: pirates.k12.ar.us

Calico Rock School District is a school district based in Calico Rock, Arkansas, United States.

It includes Calico Rock and Wideman.

On July 1, 1993, Tri-County School District was disestablished with territory given to multiple districts, including Calico Rock.

== Schools ==
- Calico Rock Elementary School, serving kindergarten through grade 6.
- Calico Rock High School, serving grades 7 through 12.
