= Pineville, Arkansas =

- Town
- Location of Pineville in Izard County, Arkansas
- Coordinates: 36°9′21″N 92°6′50″W
- Country: United States
- State: Arkansas
- County: Izard

Area
  - Total: 1.81 sq mi (4.68 km^{2})
  - Land: 1.81 sq mi (4.68 km^{2})
  - Water: 0 sq mi (0.00 km^{2})
- Elevation: 689 ft (210 m)

Population (2020)
  - Total: 154
  - Estimate (2025): 164 ▲
  - Density: 85.2/sq mi (32.91/km^{2})
- Time zone: UTC-6 (Central (CST))
  - Summer (DST): UTC-5 (CDT)
- ZIP code: 72566
- Area code: 870
- FIPS code: 05-55580
- GNIS feature ID: 2407124

Pineville is a town in Izard County, Arkansas, United States. As of the 2020 census, Pineville had a population of 154.

== Geography ==
Pineville is located in northwestern Izard County at 36°9′21″N 92°6′50″W (36.155781, -92.113759). It is bordered to the south by the city of Calico Rock.

According to the United States Census Bureau, the town has a total area of 1.8 square miles (4.6 km^{2}), all land.

=== Highways ===
- Arkansas Highway 56
- Arkansas Highway 177
- Arkansas Highway 223

== Demographics ==
Historical population
Census	Pop.	Note	%±
1980	163		—
1990	220		35.0%
2000	246		11.8%
2010	238		−3.3%
2020	154		−35.3%
2025 (est.)	164	▲	6.5%
U.S. Decennial Census

As of the census of 2010, there were 238 people, 97 households, and 72 families residing in the town. The population density was 53.4/km^{2} (138.0/mi^{2}). There were 112 housing units at an average density of 23.9/km^{2} (61.7/mi^{2}). The racial makeup of the town was 97.1% White.

Of the 97 households, 27.8% had children under the age of 18 living with them, 58.8% were married couples living together, 11.3% had a female householder with no husband present, and 25.8% were non-families. 24.7% of all households were made up of individuals, and 12.4% had someone living alone who was 65 years of age or older. The average household size was 2.45 and the average family size was 2.90.

In the town, the population was spread out, with 23.9% under the age of 20, 25.1% from 20 to 39, 25.2% from 40 to 59, and 25.6% who were 60 years of age or older. The median age was 40.5 years. The ratio of men to women was 52% men, 43% women.

The median income for a household in the town was $42,750, and the median income for a family was $47,857.
