= Guion, Arkansas =

- Town
- Location of Guion in Izard County, Arkansas
- Coordinates: 35°55′35″N 91°56′26″W
- Country: United States
- State: Arkansas
- County: Izard

Area
  - Total: 0.56 sq mi (1.45 km^{2})
  - Land: 0.56 sq mi (1.45 km^{2})
  - Water: 0 sq mi (0.00 km^{2})
- Elevation: 371 ft (113 m)

Population (2020)
  - Total: 68
  - Estimate (2025): 72 ▲
  - Density: 121.8/sq mi (47.04/km^{2})
- Time zone: UTC-6 (Central (CST))
  - Summer (DST): UTC-5 (CDT)
- ZIP code: 72540
- Area code: 870
- FIPS code: 05-29080
- GNIS feature ID: 2406626

Guion is a town in Izard County, Arkansas, United States. The population had dropped from 86 at the 2010 census to 68 in 2020.

== Geography ==
Guion is located in southern Izard County at 35°55′35″N 91°56′26″W (35.926425, -91.940598), on the northeast side of the White River.

According to the United States Census Bureau, the town has a total area of 0.54 square miles (1.4 km^{2}), all land.

=== Highway ===
- Arkansas Highway 58

== Demographics ==
Historical population
Census	Pop.	Note	%±
1910	296		—
1920	260		−12.2%
1930	288		10.8%
1940	250		−13.2%
1950	219		−12.4%
1960	222		1.4%
1970	213		−4.1%
1980	177		−16.9%
1990	93		−47.5%
2000	90		−3.2%
2010	86		−4.4%
2020	68		−20.9%
2025 (est.)	72	▲	5.9%
U.S. Decennial Census

As of the census of 2000, there were 90 people, 37 households, and 26 families residing in the town. The population density was 155.3 inhabitants per square mile (60.0/km^{2}). There were 45 housing units at an average density of 77.6 per square mile (30.0/km^{2}). The racial makeup of the town was 88.89% White, 10.00% Black or African American, and 1.11% from two or more races.

There were 37 households, out of which 21.6% had children under the age of 18 living with them, 62.2% were married couples living together, 2.7% had a female householder with no husband present, and 29.7% were non-families. 27.0% of all households were made up of individuals, and 21.6% had someone living alone who was 65 years of age or older. The average household size was 2.43 and the average family size was 2.85.

In the town, the population was spread out, with 23.3% under the age of 18, 2.2% from 18 to 24, 16.7% from 25 to 44, 24.4% from 45 to 64, and 33.3% who were 65 years of age or older. The median age was 53 years. For every 100 females, there were 91.5 males. For every 100 females age 18 and over, there were 86.5 males.

The median income for a household in the town was $16,875, and the median income for a family was $20,833. Males had a median income of $21,875 versus $16,875 for females. The per capita income for the town was $11,264. There were no families and 14.6% of the population living below the poverty line, including no under eighteens and 12.9% of those over 64.

== 1929 Tornado ==
On April 10, 1929, Guion and areas between Mount Pleasant, Arkansas by a tornado that came across the White river. The town of nearly 400 and 150 buildings was "completely demolished". Some residents had a five-minute warning from sighting the storm in the sky over the hill in the south of town. This allowed many to take shelter in storm shelters, caves or other safe places. Most of the 150 homes and stores in the town were "dashed against the bluff. Some of the large timbers were buried several feet in the ground by the force of the wind." At least seven people died and many injured.
