= Melbourne High School (Arkansas) =

Location
- 2270 Lacrosse Road; Melbourne, Arkansas 72556; United States
- Coordinates: 36°4′11″N 91°50′4″W

Information
- School type: Public comprehensive
- Status: Open
- School district: Melbourne School District
- CEEB code: 041645
- NCES School ID: 050972000711
- Teaching staff: 65.10 (on FTE basis)
- Grades: 7–12
- Enrollment: 370 (2023–2024)
- Student to teacher ratio: 5.68
- Education system: ADE Smart Core
- Classes offered: Regular, Advanced Placement (AP)
- Colors: Red, white, and blue
- Athletics: Football, Golf, Cross Country, Basketball, Baseball, Softball, Track, Cheer, Dance
- Athletics conference: 3A Region 1
- Mascot: Bearcats (spelled Bearkatz)
- Team name: Melbourne Bearkatz
- Accreditation: ADE; AdvancED (1929–)
- Website: www.bearkatz.k12.ar.us

Melbourne High School is a nationally recognized and accredited public high school located in the rural community of Melbourne, Arkansas, United States. The school provides comprehensive secondary education for approximately 400 students each year in grades 7 through 12. It is one of four public high schools in Izard County, Arkansas and the only high school administered by the Melbourne School District.

== Academics ==
Melbourne High School is accredited by the Arkansas Department of Education (ADE). The assumed course of study follows the Smart Core curriculum developed by the ADE. Students complete regular (core and elective) and career focus coursework and exams and may take Advanced Placement (AP) courses and exams with the opportunity to receive college credit.

== Athletics ==
The Melbourne High School mascot and athletic emblem is the Bearcat spelled as Bearkatz with red, white and blue serving as the school colors.

The Melbourne Bearkatz compete in interscholastic activities within the 3A Classification via the 3A Region 1 Conference (and 3A Region 1 East Conference for basketball), as administered by the Arkansas Activities Association. The Bearkatz participate in football, golf (boys/girls), cross country (boys/girls), bowling (boys/girls), basketball (boys/girls), cheer, dance, baseball, softball, and track and field (boys/girls).

- Golf: The boys golf team are 2-time state golf champions winning titles in fall 2002 and 2009. The girls team won consecutive state golf titles in 2005 and 2006.
