= Bexar, Arkansas =

- Unincorporated community
- Location within Arkansas Location within the United States
- Coordinates: 36°17′12″N 91°59′45″W
- Country: United States
- State: Arkansas
- County: Fulton
- Elevation: 886 ft (270 m)
- Time zone: UTC-6 (Central (CST))
  - Summer (DST): UTC-5 (CDT)
- ZIP code: 72515
- Area code: 870
- GNIS feature ID: 57371

Bexar is an unincorporated community in southwest Fulton County, Arkansas, United States. Bexar is located on Bexar Road just east of Arkansas Highway 223, approximately 7.5 miles (12.1 km) south of Viola. Bexar has a post office with ZIP code 72515.
