= Viola School District =

School district in Arkansas, United States

Address
- 314 Longhorn Drive Viola, Arkansas, 72583; United States

District information
- Type: Public
- Grades: K–12
- NCES District ID: 0513560

Students and staff
- Students: 383
- Teachers: 69.14
- Staff: 36.5
- Student–teacher ratio: 5.54

Other information
- Website: violaschool.k12.ar.us

Viola School District is a school district in Fulton County, Arkansas.

== Schools ==
The District includes:

- Viola Elementary School
- Viola High School
