= Wiseman, Arkansas =

- Unincorporated community
- Location within Arkansas Location within the United States
- Coordinates: 36°14′04″N 91°48′56″W
- Country: United States
- State: Arkansas
- County: Izard
- Elevation: 620 ft (190 m)
- Time zone: UTC-6 (Central (CST))
  - Summer (DST): UTC-5 (CDT)
- ZIP code: 72587
- Area code: 870
- GNIS feature ID: 58903

Wiseman is a small unincorporated community situated along the Strawberry River in the northeast corner of Izard County, Arkansas, United States.

It is within the Izard County Consolidated School District. It was previously in the Violet Hill school district. In 1985 that district consolidated into Izard Consolidated.
