= Saddle, Arkansas =

- Unincorporated community
- Location within Arkansas Location within the United States
- Coordinates: 36°21′18″N 91°38′20″W
- Country: United States
- State: Arkansas
- County: Fulton
- Elevation: 486 ft (148 m)
- Time zone: UTC-6 (Central (CST))
  - Summer (DST): UTC-5 (CDT)
- Area code: 870
- GNIS feature ID: 58564

Saddle is an unincorporated community in eastern Fulton County, Arkansas, United States. Saddle is located along Arkansas Highway 289, 10.3 miles (16.6 km) east of Salem. The community is on the banks of South Fork Spring River.
