= Franklin, Arkansas =

- Town
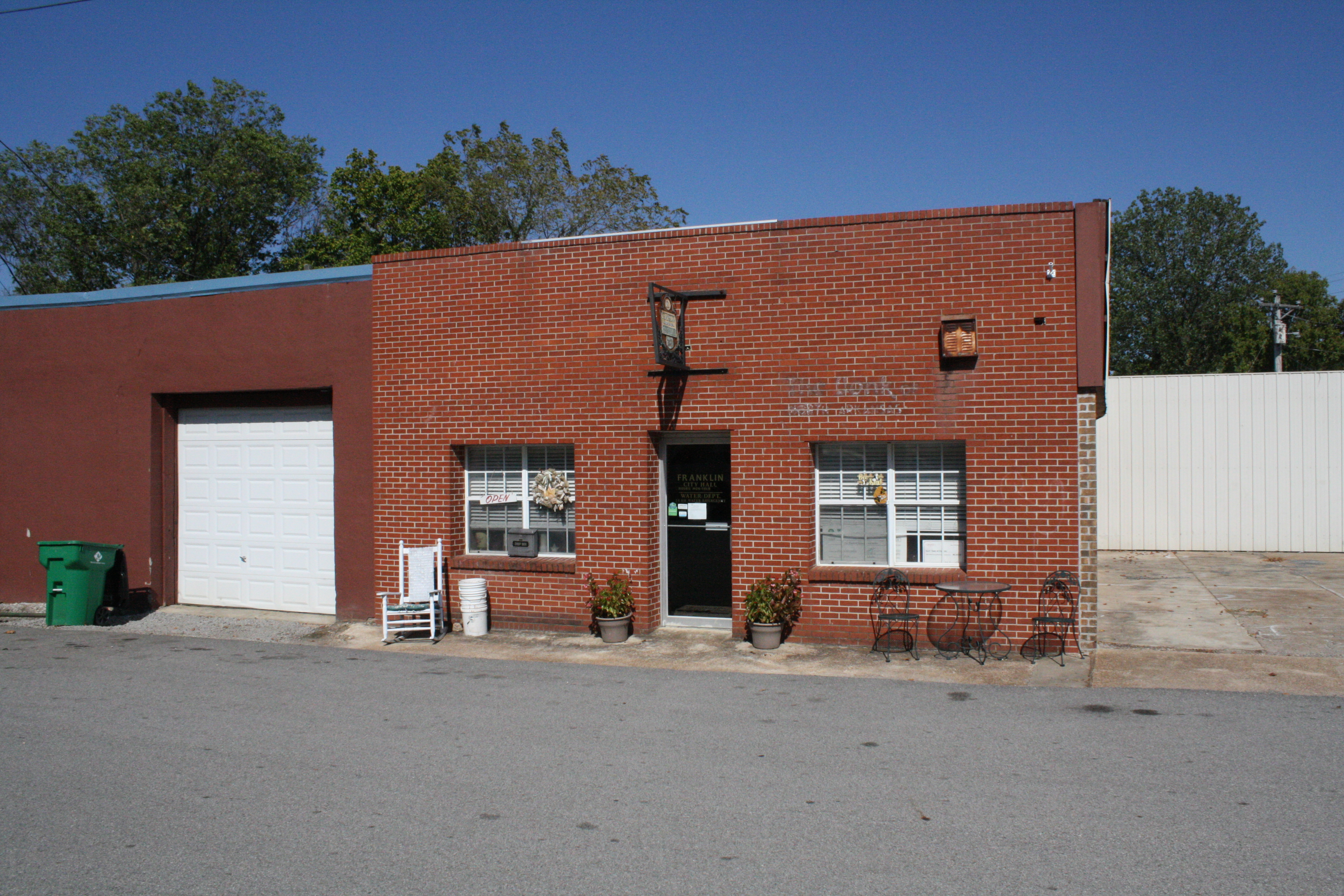
- City Hall

- Location of Franklin in Izard County, Arkansas
- Coordinates: 36°10′31″N 91°45′59″W
- Country: United States
- State: Arkansas
- County: Izard

Area
  - Total: 2.13 sq mi (5.52 km^{2})
  - Land: 2.13 sq mi (5.52 km^{2})
  - Water: 0 sq mi (0.00 km^{2})
- Elevation: 571 ft (174 m)

Population (2020)
  - Total: 191
  - Estimate (2025): 198 ▲
  - Density: 89.5/sq mi (34.57/km^{2})
- Time zone: UTC-6 (Central (CST))
  - Summer (DST): UTC-5 (CDT)
- ZIP codes: 72512, 72536
- Area code: 870
- FIPS code: 05-25030
- GNIS feature ID: 2406518

Franklin is a town in Izard County, Arkansas, United States. As of the 2020 census, Franklin had a population of 191.

== History ==
On March 14, 2025, an EF4 tornado destroyed three homes near the community, injuring two people.

== Geography ==
Franklin is located in northeastern Izard County at 36°10′31″N 91°45′59″W (36.175324, -91.766494).

According to the United States Census Bureau, the town has a total area of 2.0 square miles (5.2 km^{2}), all land.

=== Highways ===
- Arkansas Highway 56
- Arkansas Highway 289

== Demographics ==
Historical population
Census	Pop.	Note	%±
1940	100		—
1950	100		0.0%
1960	75		−25.0%
1970	117		56.0%
1980	253		116.2%
1990	205		−19.0%
2000	184		−10.2%
2010	198		7.6%
2020	191		−3.5%
2025 (est.)	198	▲	3.7%
U.S. Decennial Census; 2014 Estimate

At the 2000 census there were 184 people, 80 households, and 52 families in the town. The population density was 35.0/km^{2} (90.7/mi^{2}). There were 89 housing units at an average density of 16.9/km^{2} (43.9/mi^{2}). The racial makeup of the town was 97.83% White, 1.09% Native American, 1.09% from other races. 2.72% of the population were Hispanic or Latino of any race. Of the 80 households 23.8% had children under the age of 18 living with them, 50.0% were married couples living together, 7.5% had a female householder with no husband present, and 35.0% were non-families. 31.3% of households were one person and 25.0% were one person aged 65 or older. The average household size was 2.30 and the average family size was 2.81.

The age distribution was 21.7% under the age of 18, 11.4% from 18 to 24, 27.2% from 25 to 44, 21.7% from 45 to 64, and 17.9% 65 or older. The median age was 38 years. For every 100 females, there were 85.9 males. For every 100 females age 18 and over, there were 94.6 males.

The median household income was $19,750 and the median family income was $26,250. Males had a median income of $20,341 versus $19,167 for females. The per capita income for the town was $13,434. About 13.5% of families and 19.6% of the population were below the poverty line, including 17.6% of those under the age of eighteen and 34.1% of those sixty five or over.

== Notable people ==
- Terry Shell, lawyer and judge, served as United States federal judge in Arkansas from 1975 to 1978
- William Allan Oldfield, lawyer and politician who served as a U.S. representative from Arkansas from 1909 until his death in 1929 was born in Franklin in 1874.
