= Cherokee Village, Arkansas =

Cherokee Village
- City
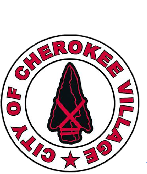
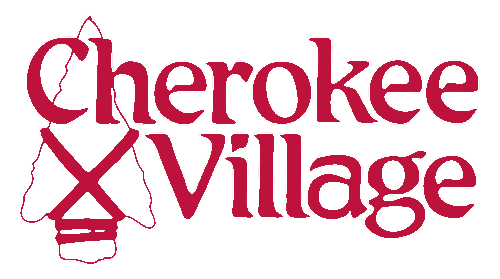
- Seal Logo

- Location of Cherokee Village in Fulton County and Sharp County, Arkansas.
- Coordinates: 36°17′36″N 91°34′20″W
- Country: United States
- State: Arkansas
- Counties: Sharp, Fulton

Area
  - Total: 21.31 sq mi (55.19 km^{2})
  - Land: 20.43 sq mi (52.91 km^{2})
  - Water: 0.88 sq mi (2.28 km^{2})
- Elevation: 692 ft (211 m)

Population (2020)
  - Total: 4,780
  - Estimate (2025): 4,981 ▲
  - Density: 234.0/sq mi (90.35/km^{2})
- Time zone: UTC-6 (Central (CST))
  - Summer (DST): UTC-5 (CDT)
- ZIP codes: 72525, 72529
- Area code: 870
- FIPS code: 05-13450
- GNIS feature ID: 2404038
- Website: cherokeevillage.gov

Cherokee Village is a city in Fulton and Sharp counties in the U.S. state of Arkansas. The population was 4,671 at the 2010 census, with a population of 4,780 in 2020 (Census).

== History ==
John Cooper, Sr. purchased 400 acres along the South Fork River in 1948 to create a summer retreat for his family. He soon realized others would also love having a place for their families to retreat, so he began purchasing additional land totaling 2,400 acres. He then began carving out lots for building homes and construction of lakes. In 1954 he founded Cherokee Village Development Company as the first planned recreation community in the state and one of the first of its kind in the nation.

Cherokee Village was dedicated in June 1955 with one lake and an airstrip.

In 1976 a Suburban Improvement District was formed under the Arkansas State Improvement District Act of 1941; Cherokee Village Suburban Improvement District (CVSID) provided services such as fire protection, street and public maintenance, police security, parks and recreation.

In 1997 Cherokee Village (CV) began with the incorporation of Cherokee Village West in the Fulton County portion of the area. In 1998, the Sharp County portion was annexed and the entire area became a city. As a result, we are the largest city in the tri-county area of Fulton, Izard and Sharp County. When CV became a city, CVSID and the city split the duties. The city is responsible for Police, Fire, Streets, District Court, Planning & Zoning. CVSID continued to care for the parks and recreation, which includes the golf courses, parks and lakes.

The city now covers over 13,000 acres with over 300 miles of hard surface roads. 2020 Census has the Cherokee Village population at 4,780 residents. Cherokee Village has 7 lakes, 2 Golf courses, outdoor pool, marinas, 3 fire stations, many churches, clubs and organizations. Cherokee Village is a first class municipality governed by a mayor-council form of government.

== Geography ==
Cherokee Village is located at 36°17′36″N 91°34′20″W (36.293289, -91.572336).

According to the United States Census Bureau, the city has a total area of 20.8 square miles (54 km^{2}), of which 19.9 square miles (52 km^{2}) is land and 0.9 square miles (2.3 km^{2}) (4.19%) is water.

The city limits include seven lakes and two marinas. The largest is Lake Thunderbird with over seven miles of shoreline. The area has become popular with vacation home owners and with those who want to rent a property for a week or two.

== Demographics ==
Historical population
Census	Pop.	Note	%±
2000	4,648		—
2010	4,671		0.5%
2020	4,780		2.3%
2025 (est.)	4,981	▲	4.2%
U.S. Decennial Census; 2014 Estimate

=== 2020 census ===
Cherokee Village racial composition
Race	Number	Percentage
White (non-Hispanic)	4,391	91.86%
Black or African American (non-Hispanic)	21	0.44%
Native American	27	0.56%
Asian	34	0.71%
Pacific Islander	2	0.04%
Other/Mixed	226	4.73%
Hispanic or Latino	79	1.65%

As of the 2020 census, Cherokee Village had a population of 4,780. The median age was 55.2 years. 18.1% of residents were under the age of 18 and 34.1% of residents were 65 years of age or older. For every 100 females there were 89.4 males, and for every 100 females age 18 and over there were 87.6 males age 18 and over.

0.0% of residents lived in urban areas, while 100.0% lived in rural areas.

There were 2,175 households in Cherokee Village, of which 20.5% had children under the age of 18 living in them. Of all households, 46.3% were married-couple households, 17.1% were households with a male householder and no spouse or partner present, and 29.9% were households with a female householder and no spouse or partner present. About 32.0% of all households were made up of individuals and 20.1% had someone living alone who was 65 years of age or older.

There were 2,895 housing units, of which 24.9% were vacant. The homeowner vacancy rate was 6.2% and the rental vacancy rate was 10.6%.

As of the 2020 census, there were 1,335 families residing in the city.

=== 2000 census ===
As of the census of 2000, there were 4,648 people, 2,182 households, and 1,577 families residing in the city. The population density was 233.7 inhabitants per square mile (90.2/km^{2}). There were 2,892 housing units at an average density of 145.4 units per square mile (56.1 units/km^{2}). The racial makeup of the city was 97.14% White, 0.17% Black or African American, 0.65% Native American, 0.24% Asian, 0.02% Pacific Islander, 0.11% from other races, and 1.68% from two or more races. 0.62% of the population were Hispanic or Latino of any race.

There were 2,182 households, out of which 16.3% had children under the age of 18 living with them, 63.3% were married couples living together, 6.7% had a female householder with no husband present, and 27.7% were non-families. 24.8% of all households were made up of individuals, and 16.0% had someone living alone who was 65 years of age or older. The average household size was 2.13 and the average family size was 2.50.

In the city, the population was spread out, with 15.6% under the age of 18, 4.1% from 18 to 24, 15.9% from 25 to 44, 26.2% from 45 to 64, and 38.1% who were 65 years of age or older. The median age was 58 years. For every 100 females, there were 90.9 males. For every 100 females age 18 and over, there were 88.7 males.

The median income for a household in the city was $27,997, and the median income for a family was $29,636. Males had a median income of $22,639 versus $18,571 for females. The per capita income for the city was $17,105. About 9.9% of families and 13.4% of the population were below the poverty line, including 29.2% of those under age 18 and 5.6% of those age 65 or over.

== Notable people ==
- Tommy Bolt, member of the World Golf Hall of Fame
- Garrard Conley, American author
