= Calico Rock, Arkansas =

- City
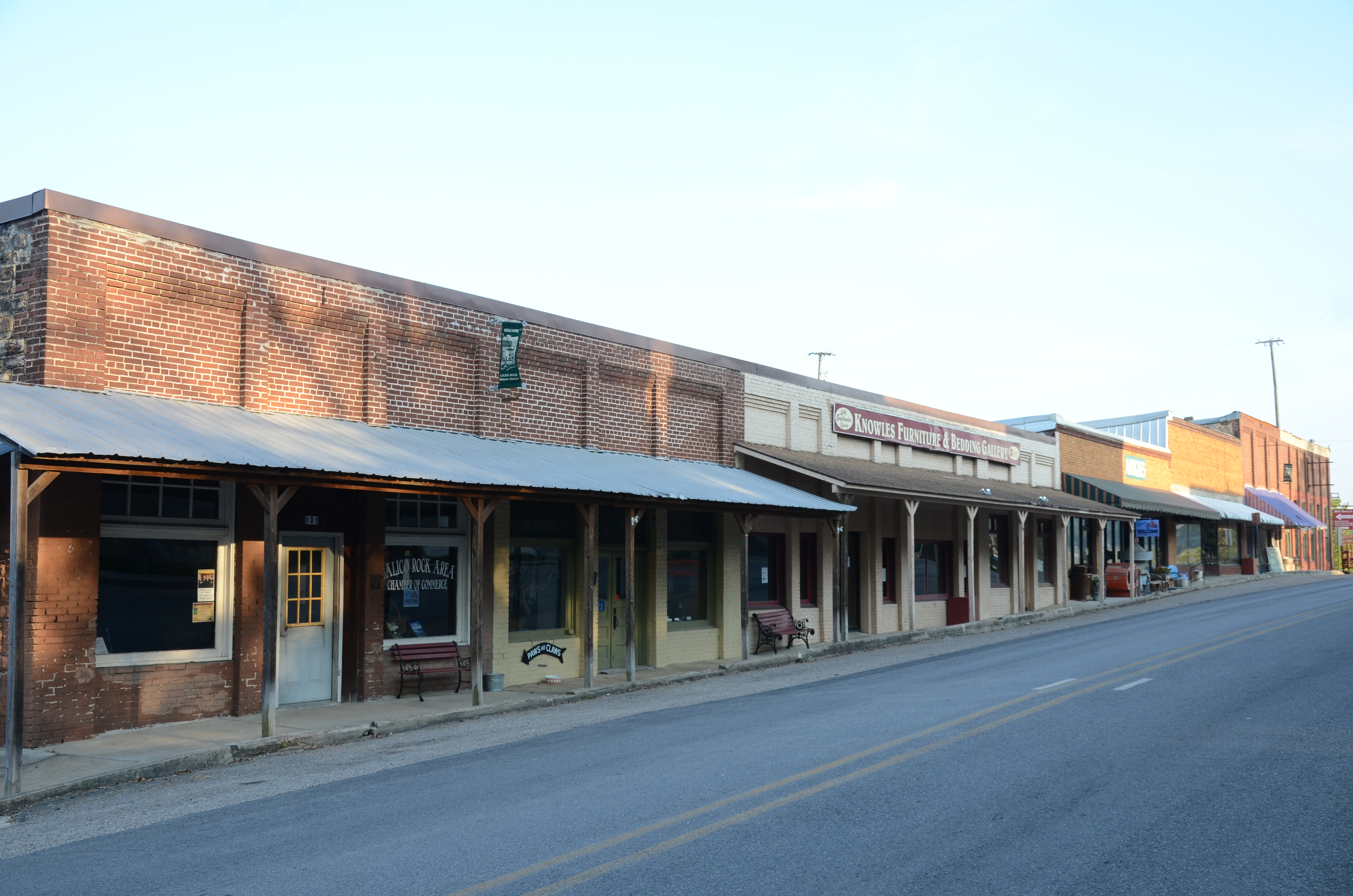
- Historic Downtown Calico Rock

- Location of Calico Rock in Izard County, Arkansas
- Coordinates: 36°07′07″N 92°08′12″W
- Country: United States
- State: Arkansas
- County: Izard
- Incorporated: 1905

Area
  - Total: 4.81 sq mi (12.47 km^{2})
  - Land: 4.76 sq mi (12.32 km^{2})
  - Water: 0.058 sq mi (0.15 km^{2})
- Elevation: 584 ft (178 m)

Population (2020)
  - Total: 888
  - Estimate (2025): 2,003 ▲
  - Density: 186.7/sq mi (72.08/km^{2})
- Time zone: UTC-6 (CST)
  - Summer (DST): UTC-5 (CDT)
- ZIP code: 72519
- Area code: 870
- FIPS code: 05-10570
- GNIS feature ID: 2403968
- Website: www.calicorock.com

Calico Rock is a city in Izard County, Arkansas, United States. The population was 888 at the 2020 census. The population was estimated to have increased to 2,021 by the 2024 census estimate, a nearly 128% increase.

== History ==
Calico Rock was named from a colorful rock formation said by pioneers to resemble the textile calico.

== Geography ==
Calico Rock is located in northwestern Izard County at 36°7′21″N 92°8′1″W (36.122612, -92.133481), on the north bank of the White River. It is bordered to the north by the town of Pineville.

According to the United States Census Bureau, the city has a total area of 4.84 square miles (12.53 km^{2}), of which 4.78 square miles (12.37 km^{2}) are land and 0.06 square miles (0.16 km^{2}), or 1.26%, are water.

=== Major highways ===
- Arkansas Highway 5
- Arkansas Highway 56

== Demographics ==
Historical population
Census	Pop.	Note	%±
1910	401		—
1920	479		19.5%
1930	659		37.6%
1940	738		12.0%
1950	963		30.5%
1960	773		−19.7%
1970	723		−6.5%
1980	1,046		44.7%
1990	938		−10.3%
2000	991		5.7%
2010	1,545		55.9%
2020	888		−42.5%
2025 (est.)	2,003	▲	125.6%
U.S. Decennial Census

=== 2020 census ===
Calico Rock racial composition
Race	Number	Percentage
White (non-Hispanic)	841	94.71%
Black or African American (non-Hispanic)	3	0.34%
Native American	6	0.68%
Asian	2	0.23%
Other/Mixed	31	3.49%
Hispanic or Latino	5	0.56%

As of the 2020 United States census, there were 888 people, 510 households, and 373 families residing in the city.

=== 2000 census ===
As of the census of 2000, there were 991 people, 428 households, and 264 families residing in the city. The population density was 277.0 inhabitants per square mile (107.0/km^{2}). There were 526 housing units at an average density of 147.0 per square mile (56.8/km^{2}). The racial makeup of the city was 97.07% White, 0.20% Black or African American, 0.71% Native American, 0.20% Asian, 0.10% Pacific Islander, 0.40% from other races, and 1.31% from two or more races. 2.22% of the population were Hispanic or Latino of any race.

There were 428 households, out of which 27.8% had children under the age of 18 living with them, 45.8% were married couples living together, 12.6% had a female householder with no husband present, and 38.3% were non-families. 35.5% of all households were made up of individuals, and 17.1% had someone living alone who was 65 years of age or older. The average household size was 2.20 and the average family size was 2.85.

In the city, the population was spread out, with 23.9% under the age of 18, 6.8% from 18 to 24, 24.6% from 25 to 44, 21.9% from 45 to 64, and 22.8% who were 65 years of age or older. The median age was 40 years. For every 100 females, there were 90.6 males. For every 100 females age 18 and over, there were 76.2 males.

The median income for a household in the city was $23,200, and the median income for a family was $31,328. Males had a median income of $20,833 versus $18,125 for females. The per capita income for the city was $14,305. About 20.2% of families and 26.2% of the population were below the poverty line, including 41.9% of those under age 18 and 15.1% of those age 65 or over.

== Education ==
Public education for elementary and secondary students is primarily provided by the Calico Rock School District, which includes:

- Calico Rock Elementary School, serving kindergarten through grade 6.
- Calico Rock High School, serving grades 7 through 12.

== Climate ==
The climate in this area is characterized by hot, humid summers and generally mild to cool winters. According to the Köppen Climate Classification system, Calico Rock has a humid subtropical climate, abbreviated "Cfa" on climate maps.

Climate data for Calico Rock, Arkansas (1991–2020 normals, extremes 1915–1937, 1964–present)
Month	Jan	Feb	Mar	Apr	May	Jun	Jul	Aug	Sep	Oct	Nov	Dec	Year
Record high °F (°C)	79 (26)	90 (32)	94 (34)	95 (35)	99 (37)	110 (43)	111 (44)	114 (46)	108 (42)	96 (36)	87 (31)	83 (28)	114 (46)
Mean maximum °F (°C)	70.8 (21.6)	74.5 (23.6)	81.1 (27.3)	85.2 (29.6)	88.4 (31.3)	93.0 (33.9)	97.1 (36.2)	97.2 (36.2)	93.3 (34.1)	86.8 (30.4)	77.9 (25.5)	70.5 (21.4)	99.2 (37.3)
Mean daily maximum °F (°C)	46.1 (7.8)	50.8 (10.4)	59.9 (15.5)	69.5 (20.8)	75.8 (24.3)	83.8 (28.8)	87.6 (30.9)	87.5 (30.8)	80.8 (27.1)	70.9 (21.6)	58.7 (14.8)	48.5 (9.2)	68.3 (20.2)
Daily mean °F (°C)	35.4 (1.9)	38.9 (3.8)	47.3 (8.5)	56.4 (13.6)	64.8 (18.2)	72.7 (22.6)	76.5 (24.7)	75.8 (24.3)	68.7 (20.4)	58.1 (14.5)	46.8 (8.2)	38.2 (3.4)	56.6 (13.7)
Mean daily minimum °F (°C)	24.7 (−4.1)	27.1 (−2.7)	34.6 (1.4)	43.3 (6.3)	53.7 (12.1)	61.6 (16.4)	65.3 (18.5)	64.2 (17.9)	56.5 (13.6)	45.3 (7.4)	35.0 (1.7)	27.9 (−2.3)	44.9 (7.2)
Mean minimum °F (°C)	8.0 (−13.3)	12.1 (−11.1)	17.6 (−8.0)	27.9 (−2.3)	38.1 (3.4)	51.1 (10.6)	56.5 (13.6)	53.7 (12.1)	42.6 (5.9)	30.3 (−0.9)	20.4 (−6.4)	13.2 (−10.4)	5.1 (−14.9)
Record low °F (°C)	−20 (−29)	−9 (−23)	6 (−14)	17 (−8)	30 (−1)	36 (2)	45 (7)	40 (4)	31 (−1)	19 (−7)	4 (−16)	−19 (−28)	−20 (−29)
Average precipitation inches (mm)	3.35 (85)	3.27 (83)	4.75 (121)	5.47 (139)	5.13 (130)	3.61 (92)	3.82 (97)	3.63 (92)	3.76 (96)	3.83 (97)	4.34 (110)	3.93 (100)	48.89 (1,242)
Average snowfall inches (cm)	2.0 (5.1)	1.9 (4.8)	1.7 (4.3)	0.0 (0.0)	0.0 (0.0)	0.0 (0.0)	0.0 (0.0)	0.0 (0.0)	0.0 (0.0)	0.0 (0.0)	0.0 (0.0)	1.1 (2.8)	6.7 (17)
Average precipitation days (≥ 0.01 in)	7.8	7.0	9.5	8.3	10.2	8.0	7.8	7.5	6.3	7.7	7.4	7.7	95.2
Average snowy days (≥ 0.1 in)	0.8	0.9	0.6	0.0	0.0	0.0	0.0	0.0	0.0	0.0	0.1	0.6	3.0
Source: NOAA
