= Brockwell, Arkansas =

- Unincorporated community
- Brockwell's position in Arkansas. Brockwell, Arkansas (the United States)
- Coordinates: 36°8′34.2″N 91°55′35.5″W
- Country: United States
- State: Arkansas
- County: Izard
- Township: Newburg
- Elevation: 607 ft (185 m)
- Time zone: UTC-6 (Central (CST))
  - Summer (DST): UTC-5 (CDT)
- ZIP code: 72517
- Area code: 870
- GNIS feature ID: 57444

Brockwell, Arkansas is an unincorporated community in Newburg Township, Izard County, Arkansas, United States. It is located at the intersection of Arkansas Highway 9 and Arkansas Highway 56.

The community is near the Pine Ridge School Building, listed on the National Register of Historic Places.

== Education ==
The Izard County Consolidated School District including the Izard County Consolidated High School is based in Brockwell. The schools mascot is the Cougar with black and gray serving as the district and school colors.
