= Izard County, Arkansas =

County in Arkansas, United States

- County
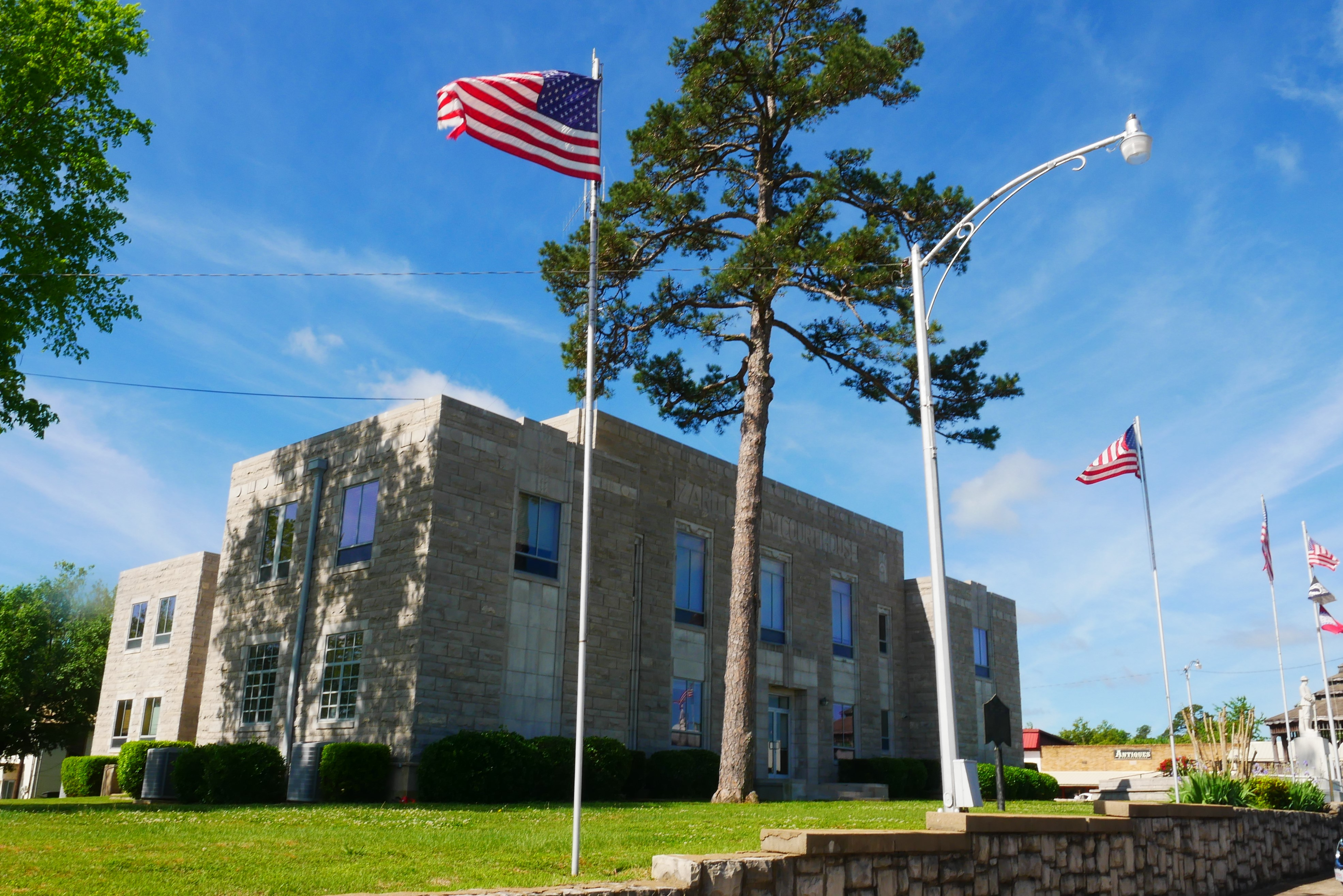
- Izard County Courthouse in Melbourne

- Location within the U.S. state of Arkansas
- Coordinates: 36°06′N 91°54′W
- Country: United States
- State: Arkansas
- Founded: October 27, 1825
- Named for: George Izard
- Seat: Melbourne
- Largest city: Horseshoe Bend

Area
  - Total: 584 sq mi (1,510 km^{2})
  - Land: 581 sq mi (1,500 km^{2})
  - Water: 3.4 sq mi (8.8 km^{2}) 0.6%

Population (2020)
  - Total: 13,577
  - Estimate (2025): 14,405 ▲
  - Density: 23.4/sq mi (9.02/km^{2})
- Time zone: UTC−6 (Central)
  - Summer (DST): UTC−5 (CDT)
- Congressional district: 1st
- Website: www.izardcountyar.org

Izard County (/ˈɪzɜːrd/) is a county located in the U.S. state of Arkansas. As of the 2020 census, the population was 13,577. The county seat is Melbourne. Izard County is Arkansas's 13th county, formed on October 27, 1825, and named for War of 1812 General and Arkansas Territorial Governor George Izard. It is an alcohol prohibition or dry county.

== Geography ==
According to the U.S. Census Bureau, the county has a total area of 584 square miles (1,510 km^{2}), of which 581 square miles (1,500 km^{2}) is land and 3.4 square miles (8.8 km^{2}) (0.6%) is water.

=== Major highways ===
- Arkansas Highway 5
- Arkansas Highway 9
- Arkansas Highway 56
- Arkansas Highway 58
- Arkansas Highway 69
- Arkansas Highway 69 Business
- Arkansas Highway 177
- Arkansas Highway 223
- Arkansas Highway 289
- Arkansas Highway 354
- Arkansas Highway 933

=== Adjacent counties ===
- Fulton County (north)
- Sharp County (east)
- Independence County (southeast)
- Stone County (southwest)
- Baxter County (northwest)

== Demographics ==
Historical population
Census	Pop.	Note	%±
1830	1,266		—
1840	2,240		76.9%
1850	3,213		43.4%
1860	7,215		124.6%
1870	6,806		−5.7%
1880	10,857		59.5%
1890	13,038		20.1%
1900	13,506		3.6%
1910	14,561		7.8%
1920	13,871		−4.7%
1930	12,872		−7.2%
1940	12,834		−0.3%
1950	9,953		−22.4%
1960	6,766		−32.0%
1970	7,381		9.1%
1980	10,768		45.9%
1990	11,364		5.5%
2000	13,249		16.6%
2010	13,696		3.4%
2020	13,577		−0.9%
2025 (est.)	14,405	▲	6.1%
U.S. Decennial Census; 1790–1960 1900–1990; 1990–2000 2010

=== 2020 census ===
As of the 2020 census, the county had a population of 13,577. The median age was 48.1 years. 17.7% of residents were under the age of 18 and 26.2% of residents were 65 years of age or older. For every 100 females there were 110.8 males, and for every 100 females age 18 and over there were 112.8 males age 18 and over.

The racial makeup of the county was 90.6% White, 1.9% Black or African American, 0.6% American Indian and Alaska Native, 0.2% Asian, 0.1% Native Hawaiian and Pacific Islander, 0.9% from some other race, and 5.6% from two or more races. Hispanic or Latino residents of any race comprised 2.4% of the population.

<0.1% of residents lived in urban areas, while 100.0% lived in rural areas.

There were 5,494 households in the county, of which 24.2% had children under the age of 18 living in them. Of all households, 49.8% were married-couple households, 19.6% were households with a male householder and no spouse or partner present, and 24.5% were households with a female householder and no spouse or partner present. About 31.3% of all households were made up of individuals and 16.2% had someone living alone who was 65 years of age or older.

There were 6,721 housing units, of which 18.3% were vacant. Among occupied housing units, 78.6% were owner-occupied and 21.4% were renter-occupied. The homeowner vacancy rate was 2.8% and the rental vacancy rate was 13.8%.

=== 2000 census ===
As of the 2000 census, there were 13,249 people, 5,440 households, and 3,769 families residing in the county. The population density was 23 people per square mile (8.9 people/km^{2}). There were 6,591 housing units at an average density of 11 units per square mile (4.2 units/km^{2}). The racial makeup of the county was 96.41% White, 1.44% Black or African American, 0.63% Native American, 0.11% Asian, 0.02% Pacific Islander, 0.26% from other races, and 1.13% from two or more races. 1.00% of the population were Hispanic or Latino of any race.

There were 5,440 households, out of which 25.50% had children under the age of 18 living with them, 58.70% were married couples living together, 7.50% had a female householder with no husband present, and 30.70% were non-families. 27.80% of all households were made up of individuals, and 15.10% had someone living alone who was 65 years of age or older. The average household size was 2.30 and the average family size was 2.78.

In the county, the population was spread out, with 20.90% under the age of 18, 7.10% from 18 to 24, 25.00% from 25 to 44, 25.80% from 45 to 64, and 21.10% who were 65 years of age or older. The median age was 43 years. For every 100 females there were 102.90 males. For every 100 females age 18 and over, there were 100.90 males.

The median income for a household in the county was $25,670, and the median income for a family was $32,313. Males had a median income of $22,389 versus $18,450 for females. The per capita income for the county was $14,397. About 13.60% of families and 17.20% of the population were below the poverty line, including 22.40% of those under age 18 and 13.70% of those age 65 or over.

== Government ==
=== Government ===
The county government is a constitutional body granted specific powers by the Constitution of Arkansas and the Arkansas Code. The quorum court is the legislative branch of the county government and controls all spending and revenue collection. Representatives are called justices of the peace and are elected from county districts every even-numbered year. The number of districts in a county vary from nine to fifteen, and district boundaries are drawn by the county election commission. The Izard County Quorum Court has nine members. Presiding over quorum court meetings is the county judge, who serves as the chief executive officer of the county. The county judge is elected at-large and does not vote in quorum court business, although capable of vetoing quorum court decisions.

Izard County, Arkansas Elected countywide officials
Position	Officeholder	Party
County Judge	Eric Smith	Republican
County/Circuit Clerk	Joe Cooper	Republican
Sheriff	Charley Melton	Republican
Treasurer	Warren Sanders	Republican
Collector	Joshua Morehead	Republican
Assessor	Tammy Sanders	Republican
Coroner	Eddie Howard	Republican

The composition of the Quorum Court after the 2024 elections is 8 Republicans and 1 Independent. Justices of the Peace (members) of the Quorum Court following the elections are:

- District 1: Mark Simino (R)
- District 2: Kelly Hatman (R)
- District 3: Randy "Hank" Sherrell (R)
- District 4: Frances L. Syce (R)
- District 5: John David Miller (I)
- District 6: Justin Thornton (R)
- District 7: Quillen P. Edwards (R)
- District 8: Doug Harber (R)
- District 9: Richard "Rich" Emmens (R)

Additionally, the townships of Izard County are entitled to elect their own respective constables, as set forth by the Constitution of Arkansas. Constables are largely of historical significance as they were used to keep the peace in rural areas when travel was more difficult. The township constables as of the 2024 elections are:

- Jefferson: Kent Andrews (R)
- New Hope: Brett Stevenson (R)
- Pleasant Hill: John Mark Rogers (R)
- Strawberry: Ian Ward (R)
- Union: Mark A. Stephen (R)

=== Politics ===
Over the past few election cycles Izard County has trended heavily towards the GOP. The last Democrat (as of 2024) to carry this county was Al Gore in 2000.

United States presidential election results for Izard County, Arkansas
Year	Republican		Democratic		Third party(ies)	
Year	No.	%	No.	%	No.	%
1896	285	15.69%	1,507	82.98%	24	1.32%
1900	381	25.10%	1,119	73.72%	18	1.19%
1904	313	32.91%	605	63.62%	33	3.47%
1908	392	28.74%	873	64.00%	99	7.26%
1912	215	18.70%	746	64.87%	189	16.43%
1916	285	18.36%	1,267	81.64%	0	0.00%
1920	485	35.87%	841	62.20%	26	1.92%
1924	241	24.10%	728	72.80%	31	3.10%
1928	696	43.45%	902	56.30%	4	0.25%
1932	200	13.90%	1,227	85.27%	12	0.83%
1936	416	23.56%	1,350	76.44%	0	0.00%
1940	366	25.67%	1,058	74.19%	2	0.14%
1944	402	31.93%	853	67.75%	4	0.32%
1948	240	15.33%	1,283	81.93%	43	2.75%
1952	629	36.68%	1,085	63.27%	1	0.06%
1956	511	29.78%	1,200	69.93%	5	0.29%
1960	808	35.94%	1,340	59.61%	100	4.45%
1964	726	29.20%	1,736	69.83%	24	0.97%
1968	931	31.16%	948	31.73%	1,109	37.12%
1972	2,001	64.26%	1,108	35.58%	5	0.16%
1976	1,394	29.52%	3,328	70.48%	0	0.00%
1980	2,266	43.13%	2,750	52.34%	238	4.53%
1984	2,726	53.08%	2,346	45.68%	64	1.25%
1988	2,824	51.19%	2,652	48.07%	41	0.74%
1992	1,532	27.42%	3,419	61.18%	637	11.40%
1996	1,678	32.82%	2,818	55.11%	617	12.07%
2000	2,301	45.73%	2,587	51.41%	144	2.86%
2004	2,833	51.57%	2,586	47.08%	74	1.35%
2008	3,193	61.19%	1,792	34.34%	233	4.47%
2012	3,575	67.73%	1,524	28.87%	179	3.39%
2016	4,042	74.19%	1,113	20.43%	293	5.38%
2020	4,631	79.71%	1,021	17.57%	158	2.72%
2024	4,854	81.92%	949	16.02%	122	2.06%

== Communities ==
=== Cities ===
- Calico Rock
- Horseshoe Bend
- Melbourne (county seat)
- Oxford

=== Towns ===
- Franklin
- Guion
- Mount Pleasant
- Pineville

=== Census-designated places ===
- Mount Olive
- Violet Hill

=== Unincorporated communities ===
- Brockwell
- Dolph
- Forty Four
- Gid
- Jumbo
- LaCrosse
- Lunenburg
- Sage
- Sylamore
- Wideman
- Wiseman
- Zion

=== Townships ===
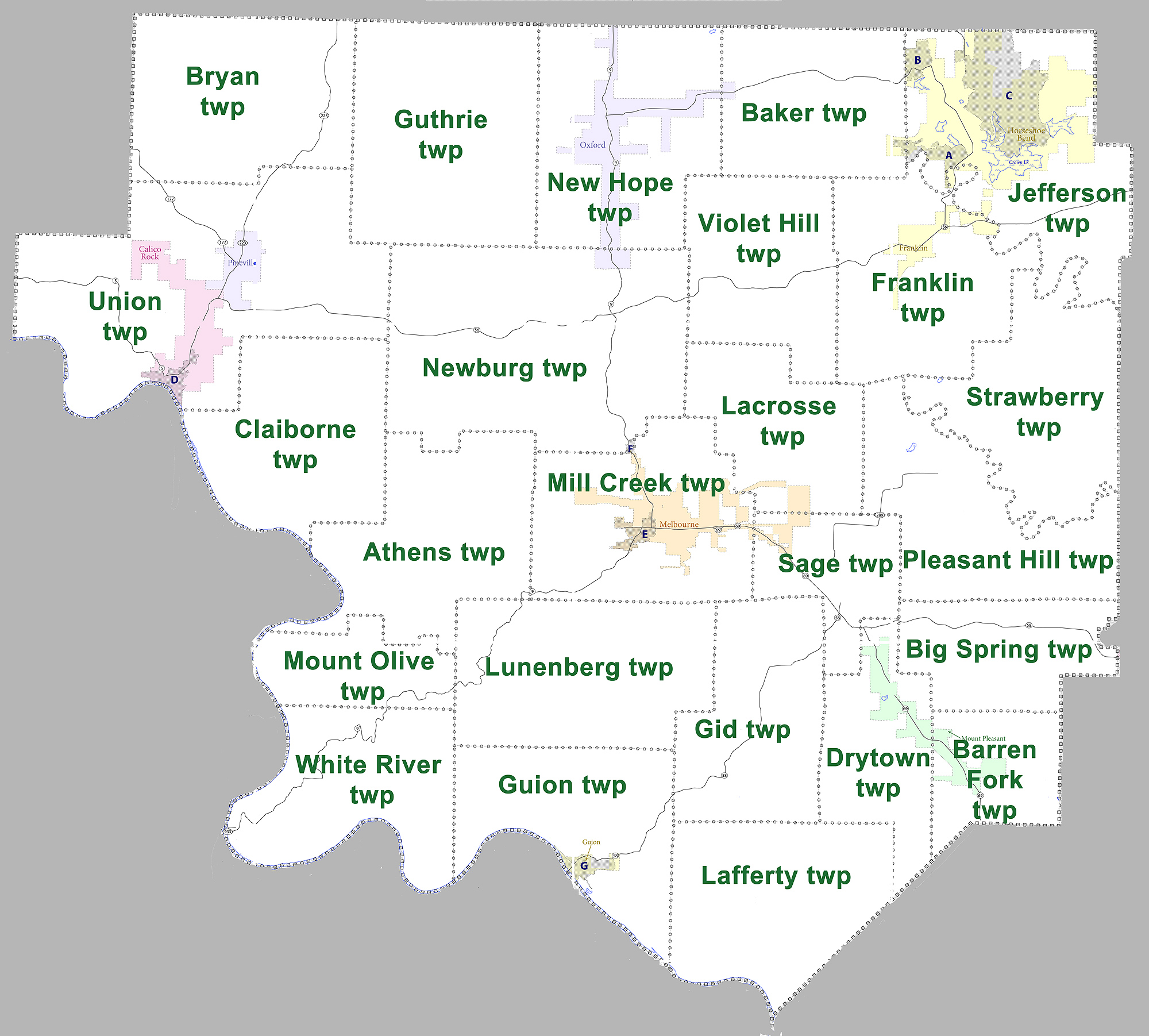
Townships in Izard County, Arkansas as of 2010

Townships in Arkansas are the divisions of a county. Each township includes unincorporated areas; some may have incorporated cities or towns within part of their boundaries. Arkansas townships have limited purposes in modern times. However, the United States census does list Arkansas population based on townships (sometimes referred to as "county subdivisions" or "minor civil divisions"). Townships are also of value for historical purposes in terms of genealogical research. Each town or city is within one or more townships in an Arkansas county based on census maps and publications. The townships of Izard County are listed below; listed in parentheses are the cities, towns, and/or census-designated places that are fully or partially inside the township.

- Athens
- Baker (small parts of Horseshoe Bend and Oxford)
- Barren Fork (part of Mount Pleasant)
- Big Spring
- Bryan
- Claiborne (small part of Calico Rock)
- Drytown (part of Mount Pleasant)
- Franklin (most of Franklin, small part of Horseshoe Bend)
- Gid
- Guion (Guion)
- Guthrie
- Jefferson (most of Horseshoe Bend, small part of Franklin)
- Lacrosse (part of Melbourne)
- Lafferty
- Lunenberg
- Mill Creek (most of Melbourne)
- Mount Olive
- Newburg (small part of Oxford)
- New Hope (most of Oxford)
- Pleasant Hill
- Sage (part of Melbourne)
- Strawberry
- Union (Pineville, most of Calico Rock)
- Violet Hill
- White River

== Notable people ==
- John E. Miller, politician, served in the Arkansas House of Representatives from 1959 to 1998
- Terry Shell, lawyer and judge, served as United States federal judge in Arkansas from 1975 to 1978

== See also ==
- List of lakes in Izard County, Arkansas
- National Register of Historic Places listings in Izard County, Arkansas
