= Jawahar L. Mehta =

American doctor and academic

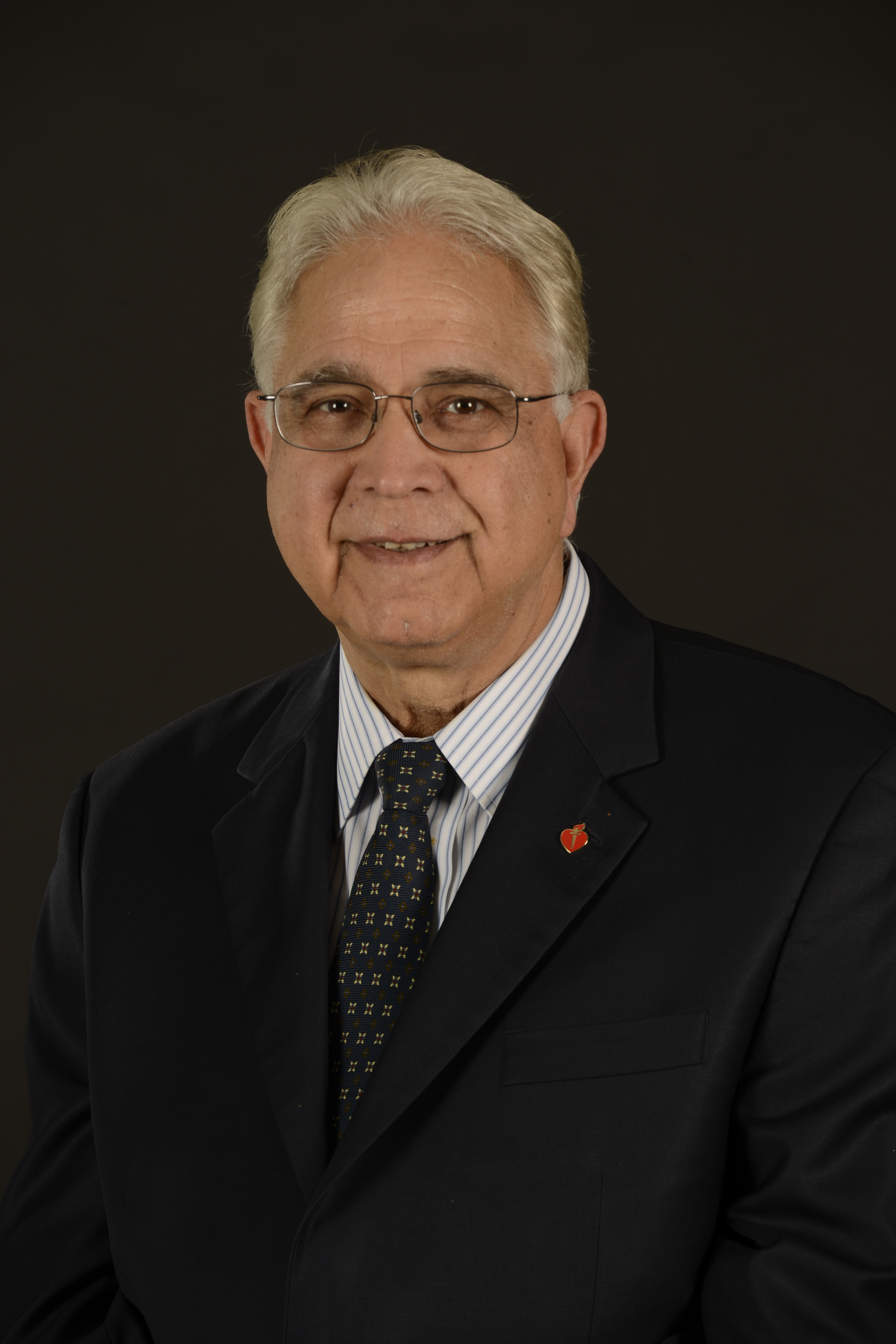
Dr. Jawahar (Jay) L. Mehta

Jawahar L. Mehta is the Stebbins Chair and Professor of Medicine at the College of Medicine, University of Arkansas for Medical Sciences (UAMS).

== Biography ==
Mehta was born in India and migrated to the United States in 1970. He received his M.D. from Punjab University in 1968 and PhD from the University of Uppsala, Uppsala, Sweden. Mehta's thesis topic was "studies on experimental myocardial reperfusion" which he completed under the direction of Prof. Tom Saldeen. He completed his post-graduate training in Medicine at the Mount Sinai Medical Center in New York, followed by a research fellowship at the University of Minnesota, Minneapolis. His first faculty position was at the University of Florida, where he rose to be Professor of Medicine. He was appointed the Stebbins Chair and Professor of Medicine and Director of Cardiovascular Medicine at the College of Medicine, University of Arkansas for Medical Sciences (UAMS) in October 2000. He is currently also an Adjunct Faculty Member at the University of Arkansas, Clinton School of Public Service in Little Rock, AR.

== Research ==
At the University of Florida College of Medicine, Mehta was among the first to describe platelet activation as a basis of acute coronary syndromes. These studies became the basis of the use of antiplatelet therapies in atherosclerotic cardiovascular diseases. Later, he went on to show that platelets also have a protective effect on the heart during ischemia mediated through release of transforming growth factor ß1. Together with Prof. Ian Phillips, he directed the hypertension center at the University of Florida. His current research is on the uptake of oxidized low-density lipoprotein (LDL) by specialized receptors LOX-1 (OLR1) in vascular tissues.

Mehta has made clinical and basic research contributions to the pathobiology of cardiovascular diseases (h index 125, 161,039 citations). His work on LOX-1 receptors, its polymorphic variants and its role in atherogenesis and myocardial ischemia has led to new therapeutic targets now being pursued by several biotech companies, such as MedImmune.

He is a member of the American Society for Clinical Investigation, American Association of Physicians, and the Association of University Cardiologists. His research has been described as "unparalleled."

He is also the director of the Molecular Cardiology Program at the University of Arkansas for Medical Sciences and adjunct professor at the University of Rome, Tor Vergata.

Over the years, Prof Mehta also explored the nexus between psychosocial stress and heart health, pioneering ideas on how loneliness, emotional trauma, and mental stress manifest in cardiac issues. “The heart is not just a pump,” he often says. “It’s an emotional organ too.” His book ‘Heart Disease- It is all in your head’ is an Amazon best-seller.

== Honors ==
Mehta delivered the Swan Memorial Lecture at the World Congress of Cardiology, Vancouver in July 2012. He has been recognized as a Distinguished Fellow by the International Academy of Cardiology, July 2014. He also received the International Pericle d’Oro Prize, University Magna Graecia of Catanzaro, Italy May 2014. In December 2017, Mehta was recognized by Forbes Magazine as one of the top 27 cardiologists in the United States. In April 2018, the University of Arkansas for Medical Sciences honored Mehta by naming him Distinguished Professor, a recognition given to "honor exemplary faculty members who have helped to shape the institution." Grateful patients have established "Mehta/Stebbins Chair in Cardiovascular Research" in his honor. In addition, there is a Jay and Paulette Mehta Visiting Lectureship established in his and his wife's honor at the University of Arkansas for Medical Sciences, Little Rock, Arkansas. The International Academy of Cardiovascular Sciences awarded Dr. Mehta the Lifetime Achievement in Cardiovascular Science, Medicine, and Surgery in 2019 at its annual meeting in Vrnjacka Banja, Serbia. In the same year, the Italian Society of Cardiology and the University of Rome Tor Vergata honored him with Distinguished Professorship and Lifetime Achievement Award.

In 2020, the Department of Veterans Affairs honored Dr. Mehta with the Senior Clinician Scientist Investigator (SCSI) Award in Cardiovascular Sciences. Later that same year, the University of Arkansas for Medical Sciences unveiled the Drs. Paulette and Jay Mehta Award in Creative Writing.

== Personal ==
Dr. Mehta is married to Paulette Mehta, MD, a professor emerita in the Department of Medicine (Hematology/Oncology) at UAMS in Little Rock, Arkansas.

== Selected publications ==
1. Mehta JL, Lawson DL, Mehta P, Saldeen TGP. Increased prostacyclin and thromboxane A2 biosynthesis in atherosclerosis. Proceedings of the National Academy of Sciences (USA) 1988;85:4511-4515.
2. Mehta JL, Nichols WW, Donnelly WH, Lawson DL, Thompson LV, ter Riet M, Saldeen TGP: Protection by superoxide dismutase from myocardial dysfunction and attenuation of vasodilator reserve following coronary occlusion and reperfusion in dog. Circulation Research 1989; 65:1283-1295.
3. Yang BC, Virmani R, Nichols WW, Mehta JL. Platelets protect against myocardial dysfunction and injury induced by ischemia and reperfusion in isolated rat hearts. Circulation Research 1993;72:1181-1190.
4. Mehta JL, Chen LY, Kone BC, et al. Identification of constitutive and inducible forms of nitric oxide synthase in human platelets. Journal of Laboratory and Clinical Medicine 125:370-377, 1995.
5. Yang BC, Phillips MI, ..... Mehta JL. Critical role of AT1 receptor expression after ischemia-reperfusion in isolated rat hearts: Beneficial effect of antisense oligodeoxynucleotides directed at AT1 receptor mRNA. Circulation Research 1998; 83:552-559.
6. Li DY, Mehta JL. Antisense to LOX-1 inhibits ox-LDL-mediated upregulation of MCP-1 expression and monocyte adhesion to human coronary artery endothelial cells. Circulation 2000;101;2889-2895.
7. Chen J, Liu Y, Liu H, Hermonat PL, Mehta JL. Molecular dissection of angiotensin II-activated human LOX-1 promoter. Arteriosclerosis, Thrombosis and Vascular Biology 2006;26:1163-1168.
8. Dandapat A, Hu C, Sun L, Mehta JL. Small concentrations of oxLDL induce capillary tube formation from endothelial cells viaLOX-1- dependent redox-sensitive pathway. Arterioscler Thromb Vasc Biol. 2007;27:2435-42.
9. Mehta JL, Sanada N, Hu CP, Chen J, Dandapat A, ..Sawamura T. Deletion of LOX-1 reduces atherogenesis in LDLR knockout mice fed high cholesterol diet. Circulation Research, 2007;100:1634-1642.
10. Ayyadevara S, Bharill P, ...., Mehta JL. Aspirin inhibits oxidant stress, reduces age-associated functional declines, and extends the lifespan of Caenorhabditis elegans. Antioxidant and Redox Signaling 2013;18:481-90
11. Ding Z, Liu S, ....Mehta JL. Lectin-like ox-LDL receptor-1 (LOX-1) - toll-like receptor 4 (TLR4) interaction and autophagy in CATH.a differentiated cells exposed to angiotensin II. Molecular Neurobiology 2014 PMID 24902807
