= Wayne, Oklahoma =

- Town
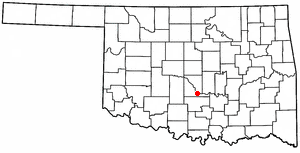
- Location in Oklahoma
- Coordinates: 34°55′01″N 97°18′59″W
- Country: United States
- State: Oklahoma
- County: McClain

Area
  - Total: 0.38 sq mi (0.98 km^{2})
  - Land: 0.38 sq mi (0.98 km^{2})
  - Water: 0 sq mi (0.00 km^{2})
- Elevation: 1,109 ft (338 m)

Population (2020)
  - Total: 625
  - Density: 1,645.8/sq mi (635.44/km^{2})
- Time zone: UTC-6 (Central (CST))
  - Summer (DST): UTC-5 (CDT)
- ZIP Code: 73095
- Area code: 405
- FIPS code: 40-79300
- GNIS feature ID: 2413459
- Website: townofwayneok.org

Wayne is a town in McClain County, Oklahoma, United States. Wayne and McClain County are part of the Oklahoma City Metropolitan Area. The population was 625 at the 2020 census, down from 688 in 2010. Wayne is part of the "Heart of Oklahoma" exurban area south of Norman and Oklahoma City.

== History ==
Wayne was named by early railroad workers from Pennsylvania who adopted town names from the railways there, including Wayne, Paoli, Ardmore, and Wynnewood. The town is named for Mad Anthony Wayne, a United States Army general and statesman. The town was significantly damaged by an EF2 tornado on December 13, 2022.

== Geography ==
Wayne is located in southern McClain County at the intersection of U.S. Highway 77 and State Highway 59. US 77 leads north 8 miles (13 km) to Purcell, the county seat, and south 7 miles (11 km) to Paoli, while OK 59 leads east 17 miles (27 km) to Byars and west 14 miles (23 km) to Payne. Oklahoma City is 43 miles (69 km) to the north.

According to the U.S. Census Bureau, the town of Wayne has a total area of 0.38 square miles (0.98 km^{2}), all land. The town sits on high ground which drains north toward the Canadian River, a tributary of the Arkansas River, and south toward the Washita River, a tributary of the Red River.

== Demographics ==
Historical population
Census	Pop.	Note	%±
1910	332		—
1920	429		29.2%
1930	427		−0.5%
1940	401		−6.1%
1950	501		24.9%
1960	517		3.2%
1970	618		19.5%
1980	621		0.5%
1990	519		−16.4%
2000	714		37.6%
2010	688		−3.6%
2020	625		−9.2%
U.S. Decennial Census

=== 2020 census ===
As of the 2020 census, Wayne had a population of 625. The median age was 37.3 years. 23.7% of residents were under the age of 18 and 12.3% of residents were 65 years of age or older. For every 100 females there were 84.4 males, and for every 100 females age 18 and over there were 84.9 males age 18 and over.

0.0% of residents lived in urban areas, while 100.0% lived in rural areas.

There were 245 households in Wayne, of which 32.2% had children under the age of 18 living in them. Of all households, 38.8% were married-couple households, 22.9% were households with a male householder and no spouse or partner present, and 31.8% were households with a female householder and no spouse or partner present. About 32.2% of all households were made up of individuals and 13.1% had someone living alone who was 65 years of age or older.

There were 292 housing units, of which 16.1% were vacant. The homeowner vacancy rate was 1.9% and the rental vacancy rate was 13.5%.

Racial composition as of the 2020 census
Race	Number	Percent
White	411	65.8%
Black or African American	11	1.8%
American Indian and Alaska Native	105	16.8%
Asian	5	0.8%
Native Hawaiian and Other Pacific Islander	0	0.0%
Some other race	11	1.8%
Two or more races	82	13.1%
Hispanic or Latino (of any race)	35	5.6%

=== 2000 census ===
As of the census of 2000, there were 714 people, 262 households, and 182 families residing in the town. The population density was 1,990.9 inhabitants per square mile (768.7/km^{2}). There were 292 housing units at an average density of 814.2 per square mile (314.4/km^{2}). The racial makeup of the town was 85.29% White, 7.84% Native American, 0.14% Pacific Islander, 2.52% from other races, and 4.20% from two or more races. Hispanic or Latino of any race were 8.68% of the population.

There were 262 households, out of which 38.5% had children under the age of 18 living with them, 49.6% were married couples living together, 16.0% had a female householder with no husband present, and 30.2% were non-families. 25.2% of all households were made up of individuals, and 12.2% had someone living alone who was 65 years of age or older. The average household size was 2.73 and the average family size was 3.28.

In the town, the population was spread out, with 28.3% under the age of 18, 12.3% from 18 to 24, 26.6% from 25 to 44, 18.9% from 45 to 64, and 13.9% who were 65 years of age or older. The median age was 35 years. For every 100 females, there were 95.1 males. For every 100 females age 18 and over, there were 91.8 males.

The median income for a household in the town was $24,554, and the median income for a family was $27,404. Males had a median income of $26,667 versus $14,500 for females. The per capita income for the town was $10,485. About 18.1% of families and 24.7% of the population were below the poverty line, including 35.4% of those under age 18 and 16.4% of those age 65 or over.

== Government ==
The Town of Wayne Court is located in Wayne, and the Wayne Municipal Court is held monthly at the Multi-Purpose Center. The Municipal Judge is appointed by the City Council.

== Education ==
It is in the Wayne Public Schools school district.

Schools in Wayne include Wayne High School, Wayne Middle School, and Wayne Elementary School. The town also has Mid-America Technology Center, a Vocational School and College.

== Notable people ==
- Harmon Dobson (1913–1967), co-founder of Whataburger; born in Wayne
- Kevin Stitt (born 1972), 28th governor of Oklahoma, attended first grade in Wayne, as recalled in his inaugural address on January 14, 2019.
