= Frank: Academics for the Real World =

American political magazine

Frank: Academics for the Real World is a publication of the University of Arkansas Clinton School of Public Service. The inaugural issue was released in Fall/Winter 2007. Skip Rutherford, Dean of the Clinton School, is the Publisher. Clinton School Director of Public Programs and Policy Patrick Kennedy is the Editor of Frank. Frank reviews concepts and ideas in public service. The publication, called Frank, and "embodies the Clinton School’s philosophy of straight forward, practical solutions."

Contributors to Frank include students, faculty and staff of the Clinton School, along with participants in the Clinton School Speaker Series. Topics reviewed in Frank range from current events and social trends to politics and popular culture.

The Arkansas Times said the first issue featured a "long and charmingly varied list of contributions from notable writers and political figures." The Fall/Winter 2007 inaugural issue of Frank was entitled "Has the Dream Arrived?" and focused on race relations in America. It included pieces by or interview with David Eisenhower, President Bill Clinton, Carlotta Walls Lanier, Karl Rove, Rev. Jesse Jackson, Richard Dawkins, Simon Cowell, Eboo Patel, Aneesh Raman, Antonio Villaraigosa, and President Paul Kagame of Rwanda.

The first issue also featured an article by Washington Post journalist Walter Pincus entitled "The Power of the Pen: A Call for Journalistic Courage," reprinted at BTC News. Jay Rosen of PressThink said the Pincus piece in Frank "moved the ball down the court...Pincus does something rare for any mainstream journalist: he openly argues for a more political press."

Editor Patrick Kennedy chose to feature Simon Cowell of American Idol in a section on pop culture, drawing press attention from the Washington Whispers section of U.S. News & World Report. Cowell said, "I would never go into politics. It can be very annoying when other people in my business go into politics." Frank has also been covered by the Chronicle of Higher Education.
