= Moorefield, Arkansas =

- Town
- Location of Moorefield in Independence County, Arkansas
- Coordinates: 35°46′02″N 91°34′15″W
- Country: United States
- State: Arkansas
- County: Independence

Area
  - Total: 1.13 sq mi (2.93 km^{2})
  - Land: 1.13 sq mi (2.93 km^{2})
  - Water: 0 sq mi (0.00 km^{2})
- Elevation: 322 ft (98 m)

Population (2020)
  - Total: 126
  - Estimate (2025): 129 ▲
  - Density: 111.4/sq mi (43.01/km^{2})
- Time zone: UTC-6 (Central (CST))
  - Summer (DST): UTC-5 (CDT)
- FIPS code: 05-46730
- GNIS feature ID: 2406186

Moorefield is a town in Independence County, Arkansas, United States. It was named after Jesse A. Moore who owned most of the land in the area of the town at that time. As of the 2020 census, Moorefield had a population of 126.

== Geography ==
Moorefield is located approximately 4 miles (6 km) east of Batesville at the intersection of Arkansas highways 233 and 69. Sulphur Rock is about four miles to the east along Route 69. Moorefield Creek flows past the north side of the town.

According to the United States Census Bureau, the town has a total area of 1.1 square miles (2.9 km^{2}), all land.

== Demographics ==
Historical population
| Census | Pop. | Note | %± |
|---|---|---|---|
| 1970 | 127 | | — |
| 1980 | 129 | | 1.6% |
| 1990 | 160 | | 24.0% |
| 2000 | 160 | | 0.0% |
| 2010 | 137 | | −14.4% |
| 2020 | 126 | | −8.0% |
| 2025 (est.) | 129 | ▲ | 2.4% |
U.S. Decennial Census

As of the census of 2000, there were 160 people, 64 households, and 48 families residing in the town. The population density was 51.1/km^{2} (132.7/mi^{2}). There were 68 housing units at an average density of 21.7/km^{2} (56.4/mi^{2}). The racial makeup of the town was 96.88% White, 0.62% Native American, and 2.50% from two or more races.

There were 64 households, out of which 31.3% had children under the age of 18 living with them, 62.5% were married couples living together, 9.4% had a female householder with no husband present, and 25.0% were non-families. 23.4% of all households were made up of individuals, and 6.3% had someone living alone who was 65 years of age or older. The average household size was 2.50 and the average family size was 2.94.

In the town, the population was spread out, with 23.8% under the age of 18, 7.5% from 18 to 24, 25.0% from 25 to 44, 26.9% from 45 to 64, and 16.9% who were 65 years of age or older. The median age was 39 years. For every 100 females, there were 90.5 males. For every 100 females age 18 and over, there were 96.8 males.

The median income for a household in the town was $26,875, and the median income for a family was $29,167. Males had a median income of $21,500 versus $19,722 for females. The per capita income for the town was $14,248. About 4.2% of families and 5.2% of the population were below the poverty line, including 12.5% of those under the age of eighteen and none of those 65 or over.

== Education ==
It is in the Batesville School District. Batesville High School is the Batesville district's sole comprehensive high school.
