= Batesville High School (Arkansas) =

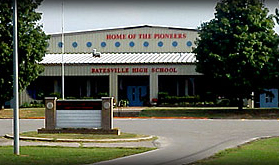
- Front building of Batesville High School

Location
- 1 Pioneer Drive; Batesville, Arkansas 72501; United States; 35°45′17″N 91°37′25″W

Information
- Type: Public
- Opened: 1915 (111 years ago)
- School district: Batesville Public Schools
- NCES District ID: 0500019
- Superintendent: David Campbell
- CEEB code: 040115
- NCES School ID: 050001900043
- Principal: Kevin Bledsoe
- Grades: 9-12
- Enrollment: 997 (2023-2024)
- Colors: Orange and black
- Athletics: Football, basketball, baseball, golf, tennis, cheerleading, cross country, track and field, soccer, volleyball, bowling, archery, wrestling
- Athletics conference: 5A East (2012-2014)
- Team name: Pioneers
- Accreditation: AdvancED (since 1924), Blue Ribbon 2008
- Yearbook: The Pioneer
- Affiliations: Arkansas Activities Association
- Website: bhs.batesvilleschools.com

Batesville High School is a public secondary school in Batesville, Arkansas, in Independence County. The school mascot is the Pioneer, and the school colors are orange and black. Batesville High has been awarded National Blue Ribbon School status. It is a part of the Batesville School District.

The district (of which, this is the sole comprhensive high school) includes Batesville, Cushman, Moorefield, Sulphur Rock, and a part of Southside. It also includes the census-designated places of Bethesda and Desha.

== History ==
The original facility created as Batesville High School has ties to the city's School Addition Historic District, which is listed on the National Register of Historic Places.

In 2021 the current campus had over 1,400 solar panels as part of the district's solar panel initiative.

== Curriculum ==
The assumed course of study at Batesville High School is the Smart Core curriculum developed by the Arkansas Department of Education (ADE). Students engage in regular and Advanced Placement (AP) coursework and exams prior to graduation. Batesville is a charter member and accredited by AdvancED (formerly North Central Association) since 1924.

In addition to its 2008 National Blue Ribbon School designation, Batesville High School was recognized nationally with the Bronze Award from the U.S. News & World Report Best High Schools ranking program. In 2006, student Ticy P. Browny was honored as a Scholar of the Presidential Scholars Program.

== Athletics ==
Batesville High School competes in football, girls' basketball, baseball, golf, tennis, swimming, softball, track, soccer, skeet shooting, archery, bowling, and volleyball, among others. In most sports, the Pioneers compete in the 5A-East Conference as administered by the Arkansas Activities Association.

In 2003, the football team won the Class AAAA State Championship.

Since 1993 the baseball team has won 5 state titles. Notable Pioneers are Chris Westervelt and Dan Wright. Both Wright and Westervelt had successful careers in professional baseball, with Wright as a starting pitcher for the Chicago White Sox before injuries ended his career.

The Girls' Cross Country Team has won 7 straight 5A Cross Country Championships (2004–2010), and the Girls' Track team has won 4 consecutive state titles. Girls' Track has won 7 state titles since 1983.

The Batesville Girls' Basketball team had an impressive run of success from 1982 to 1992, winning 5 state championships (82, 83, 88, 91, 92) and one overall state championship (1983).

== Notable former pupils ==
- Mark Martin, former race car driver and member of the NASCAR Hall of Fame.
- Skip Rutherford (born 1950), first president of the Clinton Foundation, Dean of the University of Arkansas Clinton School of Public Service
