= Arizona Soccer Association =

Sports association

Arizona Soccer Association.
- Formation: 1974; 52 years ago
- Type: Non-profit youth sports
- Location: Phoenix, Arizona, U.S.
- Region served: U.S.
- Website: azsoccerassociation.org

The Arizona Soccer Association (ASA), also known as the Arizona Youth Soccer Association (AYSA), is a nonprofit organization which was founded in 1974. The organization's goals are to promote the physical, mental and emotional growth and development of the youth of Arizona through soccer. The ASA/AYSA is a member of the United States Youth Soccer Association and the United States Soccer Federation.

== Funding ==
The organization is partially supported by fund-raising events.

The ASA is also sponsored by numerous private entities including Adidas, Dick's Sporting Goods, Gatorade, Grand Canyon University, Jimmy John's, Marriott Hotels, Port of Subs, & Whataburger among others.
