= McGarrah Jessee =

Companies based in Austin

- Type: Private
- Industry: Advertising
- Founded: 1996
- Headquarters: Austin, Texas, United States
- Key people: Founders: Mark McGarrah, Bryan Jessee
- Website: www.mcj.co

McGarrah Jessee is an independent brand development and integrated marketing agency based in Austin, Texas. The firm, named “Small Agency of the Year: Gold” by Advertising Age in 2017, is known for building cult brands and for its broad definition of brand development, which includes retail design, packaging, merchandise, nontraditional and digital executions in addition to advertising.

== Clients ==
McGarrah Jessee has a reputation for working with cult brands. Longtime clients include: Frost Bank (23+ years), Whataburger (17+ years), and Costa Sunglasses (12+ years).

== History ==
The agency was founded in 1996 by Mark McGarrah and Bryan Jessee, who were colleagues at The Richards Group and GSD&M. Early clients included Seiko and Gatti's Pizza. The following year, McGarrah Jessee became agency of record for Frost National Bank. By 2000 the firm had added seven more clients and grown to 27 employees.

Over the next several years, McGarrah and Jessee broadened the agency's capabilities by launching a business planning group and a design studio, initially as independent partner agencies, which were later folded into a single multi-disciplinary agency.

In 2009 the company began restoration of the historic American National Bank Building, one of the exemplars of mid-century modern architecture in the state of Texas. The building, which features a mural by 20th-century artist Seymour Fogel and interior design by international style architect Florence Knoll, became the firm's new home in November 2010. The McGarrah Jessee Building, as it is now known, has received honors from the American Institute of Architects.

In 2012, McGarrah Jessee acquired boutique digital agency Exopolis, deepening its in-house digital capabilities.

In 2014, the agency celebrated hiring its 100th employee.

In 2015, the agency added an in-house film production studio called Rabbit Foot, helmed by film and commercial director Jeff Bednarz.

== Industry Recognition ==
McGarrah Jessee has been named a Best Place to Work by Outside Magazine and “Small Agency of the Year: Gold” by Advertising Age. Its work has been recognized nationally by The One Show, the OBIE Awards, the ADDY awards, AIGA, Graphis, Type Directors Club and has been featured in Lürzer's Archive and Communication Arts Advertising, Design and Typography annuals.
