= Batesville School District =

School district in Arkansas

District information
- Grades: Pre-school - 12
- Superintendent: Ginni McDonald
- NCES District ID: 0500019

Students and staff
- Enrollment: 3,068
- Staff: 250.81 (on an FTE basis)
- Student–teacher ratio: 13.25

Other information
- Telephone: (870) 793-6831
- Website: www.batesvilleschools.com

The Batesville School District is a public school district in Independence County, Arkansas, United States, based in Batesville, Arkansas.

The district includes Batesville, Cushman, Moorefield, Sulphur Rock, and a part of Southside. It also includes the census-designated places of Bethesda and Desha.

== History ==
Desha School District consolidated into Batesville School District on July 1, 1985. Sulphur Rock School District consolidated into Batesville School District on July 1, 2005. Cushman School District consolidated into Batesville School District on July 1, 2009.

By 2020 the district decreased expenses by switching to solar power, allowing it to raise teacher salaries. The solar panels were funded by a bond initiative.

== Schools ==
The Batesville School District has one early learning center, one preschool, one junior high school, two high school and three magnet schools.

=== Early learning center ===
- Early Learning & Enrichment Center

=== Preschool ===
- Batesville Preschool

=== Junior high school ===
- Batesville Junior High School

=== High schools ===
- Batesville High School
- White River Academy - Alternative Learning Environment, Grades 7-12

=== Magnet schools ===
- Sulphur Rock Math & Science Magnet School
- West Visual & Performing Arts Magnet School
- Eagle Mountain Magnet Health & International School
