= Harmon Dobson =

American entrepreneur

- Born: Harmon Archibald Dobson; October 8, 1913; Wayne, Oklahoma, U.S.
- Died: April 11, 1967 (aged 53); La Porte, Texas, U.S.
- Occupation: Entrepreneur
- Known for: Co-founding Whataburger with Paul Burton
- Spouse: Grace Williamson (m. 1955)

Harmon Archibald Dobson (October 8, 1913 – April 11, 1967) was an American entrepreneur best known as one of the founders of the fast food chain Whataburger. Dobson was involved in the early growth of the franchise from 1950 until his death in an airplane crash in 1967.

== Early life ==
Harmon Dobson was born in 1913 in Wayne, Oklahoma, to Hugh and Ethel Dobson. Dobson was raised in a small rural farming community of Cushman, Arkansas. Dobson spent most of his early life working on his parents' cattle farm.

At age 16, Dobson was accepted into the University of Missouri to study journalism, but was forced to return to his family farm soon after attending due to a family crisis at home due to the Great Depression. In 1934, Dobson started work as an apprentice ironworker, later becoming a shipbuilder at the start of World War II.

In 1942, Dobson went to North Africa to do work on pipefitting scrapyard work, and cable rigging for Bell Telephone Company. Dobson later was hired to help build a naval base where he worked on building radio towers, tanks and hangars. Dobson then held numerous jobs, including work on the Suez Canal in Egypt, and then in Bahrain where he was in charge of construction of a mess hall. After World War II ended in 1945, Dobson returned home to his home state of Arkansas, where he worked buying and selling used cars.

In 1955, Harmon married Grace Williamson, a widow with a five-year-old son. Harmon and his wife had two children, a daughter born in 1956 and a son born in 1957.

== Whataburger ==
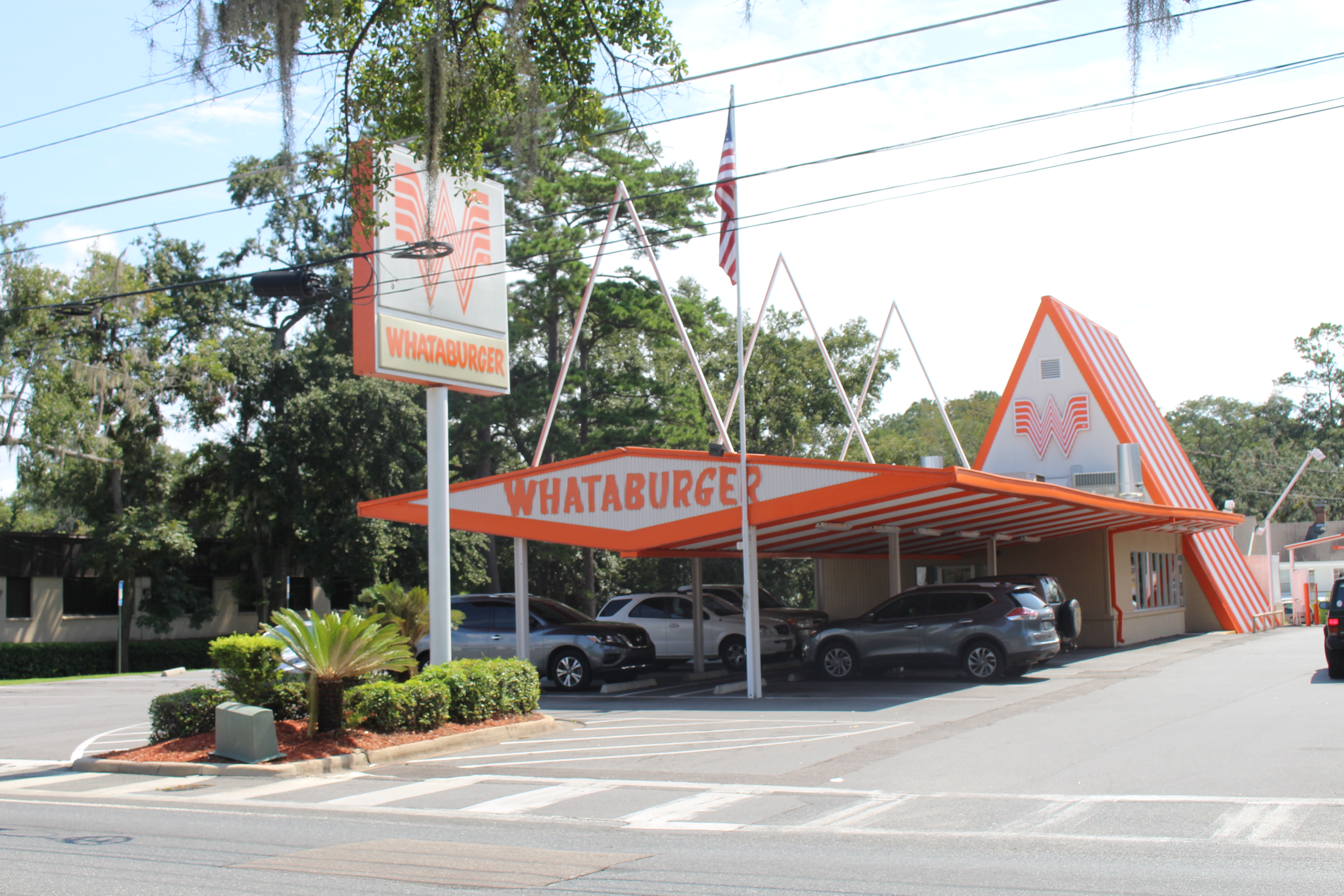
A Whataburger restaurant in Tallahassee, Florida

Dobson moved to Texas, where he co-founded the first Whataburger with Paul Burton, who was looking to open a hamburger restaurant. Dobson and Burton's goal was to make a burger that took two hands to hold and that tasted good. In June 1950, Dobson was granted the Whataburger name trademark. In August, they opened their first location on Ayers Street in Corpus Christi, Texas, across the street from Del Mar College.

Dobson and Burton's business venture was short lived, their partnership ending in 1951 because of a dispute over Dobson's price raise of the burger from 25 to 30 cents. Burton and Harmon decided that Burton would own the Whataburger franchises in San Antonio, Texas, while Harmon would own the rest of the company and its franchises. Months later, Harmon raised the prices for burgers to 35 cents. In 1952, Dobson opened a location in Kingsville, Texas, this was the first store located outside of Corpus Christi. In 1953, Joe Andrews Sr. became the first franchise owner that was not one of the original founders, with a location in Alice, Texas. In 1959, the first Whataburger restaurant outside of the state of Texas opened in Pensacola, Florida.

By 1960, Whataburger stores had expanded and were operating across Texas, Florida, and Tennessee. Dobson, an avid pilot who was inspired by his time in the sky, designed the orange and white striped A-frame store in Odessa, Texas in 1961. In 1962, the company introduced French fries and hot pies to its menu. In 1963, Whataburger opened its first location in Arizona bringing the number of stores to 26. By 1965, it was estimated that Whataburger was selling 15,000 hamburgers a day. By 1967, business was booming. Whataburger had commissioned the "Flying W" company logo and had expanded to 40 locations in four states.

== Death ==
On April 11, 1967, at around 4:30 p.m., Dobson and his business associate Luther John Sneed took off in Dobson's Cessna Skymaster from an airport in LaPorte heading for Victoria, Texas. According to witnesses, Dobson was apparently taking off in a steep climb when both engines on the plane failed at around 75 to 100 feet (23 to 30 m) in the sky and then plummeted back into the ground. The National Transportation Safety Board (NTSB) summary classifies the accident type as a stall. The crash killed Dobson and his business associate.

In his will, Dobson left the company to his wife, Grace Dobson, who at the time was encouraged to sell the company. She ultimately refused to sell the company, wanting it to be kept in the family, and became chairwoman of the board of Whataburger until her death in 2005. The company was not sold until 2019 and the family still has a minority stake. In 1993, her son Tom Dobson became the CEO and president of Whataburger.
