= Cushman School District =

Defunct school district in Arkansas, United States

Cushman School District was a school district headquartered in Cushman, Arkansas.

At its end it operated Cushman Preschool, Cushman Elementary School (K-6), and Cushman High School (7-12).

Previously it operated these levels:

- Cushman Preschool
- Cushman Elementary School
- Cushman Middle School
- Cushman Jr. High School
- Cushman High School

Cushman School District consolidated into Batesville School District on July 1, 2009.
