= Cushman, Arkansas =

- City
- Location of Cushman in Independence County, Arkansas.
- Coordinates: 35°52′10″N 91°45′53″W
- Country: United States
- State: Arkansas
- County: Independence

Area
  - Total: 4.08 sq mi (10.56 km^{2})
  - Land: 4.08 sq mi (10.56 km^{2})
  - Water: 0 sq mi (0.00 km^{2})
- Elevation: 702 ft (214 m)

Population (2020)
  - Total: 433
  - Estimate (2025): 447 ▲
  - Density: 106.2/sq mi (41.02/km^{2})
- Time zone: UTC-6 (Central (CST))
  - Summer (DST): UTC-5 (CDT)
- ZIP code: 72526
- Area code: 870
- FIPS code: 05-16930
- GNIS feature ID: 2404170

Cushman is a city in Independence County, Arkansas, United States. The population was 433 at the 2020 census.

== Geography ==
Cushman is located at 35°52′10″N 91°45′53″W (35.869346, -91.764695).

According to the United States Census Bureau, the town has a total area of 4.0 square miles (10 km^{2}), all land.

=== Transportation ===
- Arkansas Highway 69

== Demographics ==
Historical population
Census	Pop.	Note	%±
1910	244		—
1920	349		43.0%
1930	412		18.1%
1940	427		3.6%
1950	314		−26.5%
1960	241		−23.2%
1970	427		77.2%
1980	556		30.2%
1990	428		−23.0%
2000	461		7.7%
2010	452		−2.0%
2020	433		−4.2%
2025 (est.)	447	▲	3.2%
U.S. Decennial Census; 2018 Estimate

As of the census of 2000, there were 461 people, 178 households, and 140 families residing in the town. The population density was 115.6 inhabitants per square mile (44.6/km^{2}). There were 208 housing units at an average density of 52.2 per square mile (20.2/km^{2}). The racial makeup of the town was 96.53% White, 1.08% Native American, and 2.39% from two or more races. 1.08% of the population were Hispanic or Latino of any race.

There were 178 households, out of which 35.4% had children under the age of 18 living with them, 66.3% were married couples living together, 11.8% had a female householder with no husband present, and 20.8% were non-families. 18.5% of all households were made up of individuals, and 6.7% had someone living alone who was 65 years of age or older. The average household size was 2.59 and the average family size was 2.95.

In the town the population was spread out, with 25.8% under the age of 18, 7.2% from 18 to 24, 26.5% from 25 to 44, 31.0% from 45 to 64, and 9.5% who were 65 years of age or older. The median age was 39 years. For every 100 females, there were 97.0 males. For every 100 females age 18 and over, there were 94.3 males.

The median income for a household in the town was $25,000, and the median income for a family was $29,125. Males had a median income of $22,266 versus $16,625 for females. The per capita income for the town was $11,836. About 15.1% of families and 20.8% of the population were below the poverty line, including 22.9% of those under age 18 and 29.2% of those age 65 or over.

== Climate ==
The climate in this area is characterized by hot, humid summers and generally mild to cool winters. According to the Köppen Climate Classification system, Cushman has a humid subtropical climate, abbreviated "Cfa" on climate maps.

== Education ==
Batesville School District serves the community. The Cushman School District consolidated into the Batesville district on July 1, 2009.

Batesville High School is the Batesville district's sole comprehensive high school.

== Notable people ==
- Harmon Dobson (1913–1967), co-founder of Whataburger, grew up in Cushman.
- Buck Weaver (1905–1967), college and professional football player, was born in Cushman.
