= Victoria DeFrancesco Soto =

American political scientist and academic administrator

Victoria Maria DeFrancesco Soto (born 1978) is an American political scientist and academic administrator. She is dean of the Clinton School of Public Service at the University of Arkansas. She became the first Latina woman to occupy the position of Dean in a presidential institution. She was previously the assistant dean for civic engagement and a senior lecturer at the Lyndon B. Johnson School of Public Affairs. In July 2025, Victoria Maria DeFrancesco Soto joined the Board of Trustees at the Kaiser Family Foundation (KFF).

She researches immigration, women and politics, political psychology, and campaigns and elections.

== Early life ==
DeFrancesco Soto was born to Victoria and Joseph DeFrancesco in Southern Arizona. Her mother is from Sonora. She is of Italian, Jewish, and Mexican descent.

== Education ==
She completed a bachelor's degree in political science and Latin American studies at the University of Arizona. She earned a master's and, with the guidance of Dr. John Aldrich and Dr. Paula D. McClain as her doctoral advisors, earned her Ph.D. in political science from the Graduate School of Duke University. Her 2007 dissertation was titled, Do Latinos Party All the Time? The Role of Shared Ethnic Group Identity on Political.

== Career ==
In 2007, she moved to Chicago to work as an assistant professor at Northwestern University until 2011. In 2013, she was a lecturer of Mexican American and Latino/a Studies at the University of Texas at Austin. During her time at the University of Texas at Austin, she held various positions such as Director of Outreach, Director of Office of Civic Engagement and Assistant Dean & Chief Diversity Officer.

DeFrancesco Soto is the first Latina dean of the Clinton School of Public Service.

DeFrancesco Soto has been a contributor and analyst for news outlets including CNN, Telemundo, NBCNews, Fox, HBO, and Univision. Her work involves social science research.
