= The Arkansas Traveler (newspaper) =

Student newspaper of the University of Arkansas

- The front page of The Arkansas Traveler
- Type: Student newspaper and mobile app
- Editor-in-chief: Sophia Nabours
- Founded: 1906
- Language: English
- Headquarters: University of Arkansas, Fayetteville, Arkansas
- Circulation: Daily university and local news website, mobile app, and quarterly print.
- Website: uatrav.com

The Arkansas Traveler (sometimes abbreviated to just The Traveler) is the student newspaper of the University of Arkansas. It is printed once a month and has an online edition that is updated daily.

The Traveler is distributed free on campus and around the city of Fayetteville, Arkansas, and usually contains a mix of campus and local news coverage.

The Traveler is an affiliate of UWIRE, which distributes and promotes its content to their network.

== History ==
Students at the university had published student literary magazines as early as 1895, but the first student newspaper was founded on Oct. 10, 1906, as The University Weekly. The newspaper was supported by student subscriptions and remains a student-operated publication. Its first editor was Joseph Othel York, a senior from Bellefonte, Arkansas, who published the paper weekly through the end of the academic year.

Early stories in the newspaper included coverage of the university debate team, reports by faculty members, sports stories and news from the three residence halls. It initially was printed on tabloid size paper, briefly printed in magazine format during the 1909–10 school year, switched to broadsheet during the 1920s and 1930s and back to tabloid during the 1940s.

The first woman to edit the newspaper was Elizabeth Adams, who ran the paper during the 1913–14 school year. The first cartoonist for the newspaper, Stuart Carothers, who also worked on the paper during that period, became well known across the country when he went to work for the Chicago Herald Examiner in 1914–1915, drawing a cartoon strip called Charlie Chaplin's Comic Capers, which was syndicated to 60 metropolitan newspapers.

The name of the newspaper was changed in 1920 when editors decided to publish the paper more than once a week. The editors sponsored a contest to select a new name, and The Arkansas Traveler, well known as the name of a story by Sandford C. Faulkner that was later put to music in the song also titled "The Arkansas Traveler", was chosen.

The Traveler briefly suspended operations in 1917 when a flu epidemic forced the university and the surrounding Fayetteville community to be quarantined. Otherwise, the newspaper has printed without interruption since, even printing an edition about a blaze that consumed the newspaper offices and printing plant when the university's Hill Hall caught fire in 1969.

Skip Rutherford was editor from 1971 to 1972.
