= Argenta station =

Argenta
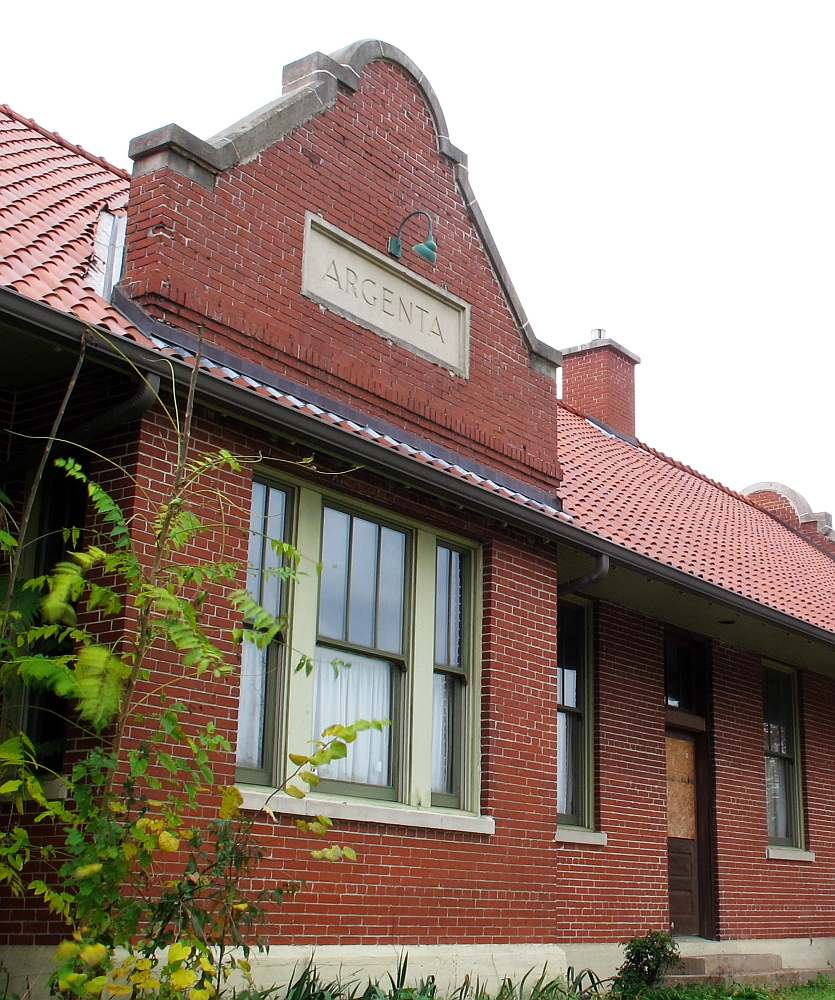
- Argenta station in December 2012.

General information
- Location: 1201 East Fourth Street, Argenta, Arkansas 72114
- System: Former Rock Island Line passenger station
- Platforms: 1

History
- Rebuilt: 1913

Services
Preceding station	Chicago, Rock Island and Pacific Railroad	Following station
Little Rock toward Tucumcari	Tucumcari – Memphis	Galloway toward Memphis
- Rock Island-Argenta Depot
- U.S. National Register of Historic Places
- Location within Arkansas Location within the United States
- Location: 4th and Hazel, North Little Rock, Arkansas
- Coordinates: 34°45′24″N 92°15′13″W
- Area: less than one acre
- Architectural style: Mission/Spanish Revival
- NRHP reference No.: 89001403
- Added to NRHP: September 21, 1989
Location

The Rock Island-Argenta Depot is a historic former railroad station at 4th, Beech, and Hazel Streets in North Little Rock, Arkansas. It is a single-story brick structure with a roughly cruciform plan. It has a gabled red tile roof with parapeted gable ends, in the Mediterranean style common to railroad stations of the Rock Island Railroad. The building houses two waiting rooms, with the telegrapher's bay projecting on the former track side, and a baggage room projecting on the street side. Built in 1913, it is a well-preserved example of a Rock Island station, and a reminder of the importance of the railroad to the city's growth.

The building was listed on the National Register of Historic Places in 1989.

== See also ==
- National Register of Historic Places listings in Pulaski County, Arkansas
