= Sulphur Rock School District =

Defunct school district in Arkansas, United States

Sulphur Rock School District was a school district headquartered in Sulphur Rock, Arkansas.

Sulphur Rock School District consolidated into Batesville School District on July 1, 2005.
