= Choctaw Route Station =

Former railroad station in Little Rock, Arkansas, US

Little Rock
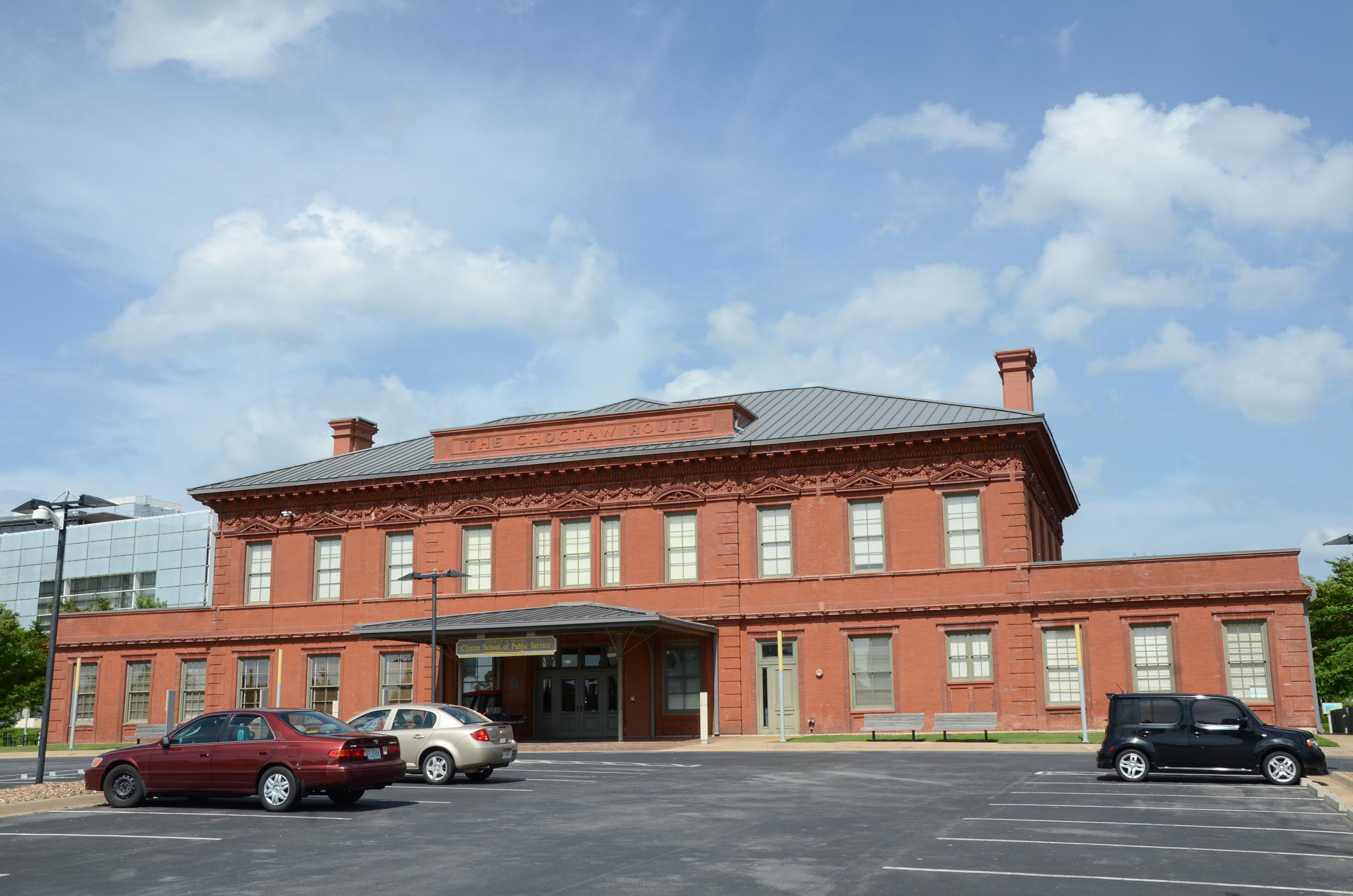
- The renovated Choctaw Station houses the Clinton School of Public Service and the Clinton Foundation office.

General information
- Location: 1200 President Clinton Avenue, Little Rock, Arkansas 72201
- System: Former Rock Island Line passenger rail station
- Owner: Clinton School of Public Service
- Line: Chicago, Rock Island and Pacific Railroad
- Platforms: 2 (Formerly)
- Tracks: 2 (Formerly)

History
- Opened: 1899
- Closed: 1968

Former services
Preceding station	Chicago, Rock Island and Pacific Railroad	Following station
South End toward Tucumcari	Tucumcari – Memphis	Argenta toward Memphis
Terminus	Little Rock – Eunice	Bauxite toward Eunice
- Choctaw Route Station
- U.S. National Register of Historic Places
- Location within Arkansas Location within the United States
- Location: E. 3rd at Rock Island RR., Little Rock, Arkansas
- Coordinates: 34°44′44″N 92°15′32″W
- Area: less than one acre
- Built: 1899
- Built by: Choctaw, Oklahoma and Gulf Railroad
- NRHP reference No.: 75000404
- Added to NRHP: May 6, 1975
Location

The Choctaw Route Station is a historic former railroad station on East 3rd Street in the riverfront area of Little Rock, Arkansas. The building now houses the Clinton School of Public Service, a branch of the University of Arkansas at the Clinton Presidential Center. The station, built in 1899 for the Choctaw, Oklahoma and Gulf Railroad, is a single-story brick building with elaborate terra cotta detailing, and is one of the architecturally finest stations in the state.

Major named passenger trains included:

- Californian
- Cherokee
- Choctaw Rocket
- Memphis-Californian
- Southwest Express

By the mid-1960s the trains had dwindled down the Memphis-Californian successor, the Memphis-Tucumcari, an overnight coach-only Memphis-Little Rock-Oklahoma City-Amarillo-Tucumcari train. This final train at the station was terminated between fall 1967 and summer 1968.

The station was listed on the National Register of Historic Places in 1975.

== See also ==
- National Register of Historic Places listings in Little Rock, Arkansas
