= Sulphur Rock Railway =

The Sulphur Rock Railway was a horsecar street railway in Sulphur Rock, Arkansas. It was the last known public utility horsecar service to operate in the United States, running until April 1926.

When Sulphur Rock was bypassed by the St. Louis, Iron Mountain and Southern Railroad, the town sought a way to connect to the new road. Originally incorporated as the Sulphur Rock Street Railway Company in June 1889, it was reincorporated about a month later under its operational name. (Note: One source states that the July articles of incorporation and stock certificates were issued under the name Sulphur Rock Railroad Company.) A three-quarters-mile (1.2 km) track was laid from the town to the railroad's depot and operations began that year. In 1907, the company carried the fewest passengers of any street railway in the country, with 1,300 trips reported that year.

In 1910, the Sulphur Rock Railway was acquired by "Skipper John" Huddleston, who also operated the Huddleston Hotel. His mule, Dick, was noted for its ability to follow commands and work autonomously, reportedly even making solo runs at the correct times if Skipper John did not helm the tram. Huddleston claimed that the venture was profitable enough to provide funds to pay for his sons' schooling, though the final years of business were conducted at a loss. The line ceased operation in April 1926. The Arkansas State Highway Department sought to utilize the streetcar's right of way for a new road, but the tracks would have interfered with the intended roadway. Thus that summer, a group of vandals simply tore up the tracks to make way for the new road, ending the history of the railway.

The United States Post Office issued a commemorative postage stamp with the Sulphur Rock Railway as its subject in 1983. Approximately 40 million stamps were produced.
