= What-A-Burger =

Hamburger restaurant chain in Virginia, United States

- Type: Private
- Industry: Restaurant
- Founded: 1957; 69 years ago
- Founders: Jack Branch and Paul E. Branch Jr.

What-A-Burger is the trading name used by a small group of restaurants which were established by entrepreneur brothers Jack Branch and Paul E. Branch Jr. and members of the Branch family beginning in 1957. With the first location at a busy traffic circle near Newport News, Virginia, in the former Warwick County, they soon established additional locations in the cities of Richmond, Colonial Heights, and Petersburg, Virginia, each along busy through-traffic highway corridors. Another location was opened by a member of the Branch family in the 1950s in Greenville, South Carolina.

== History ==
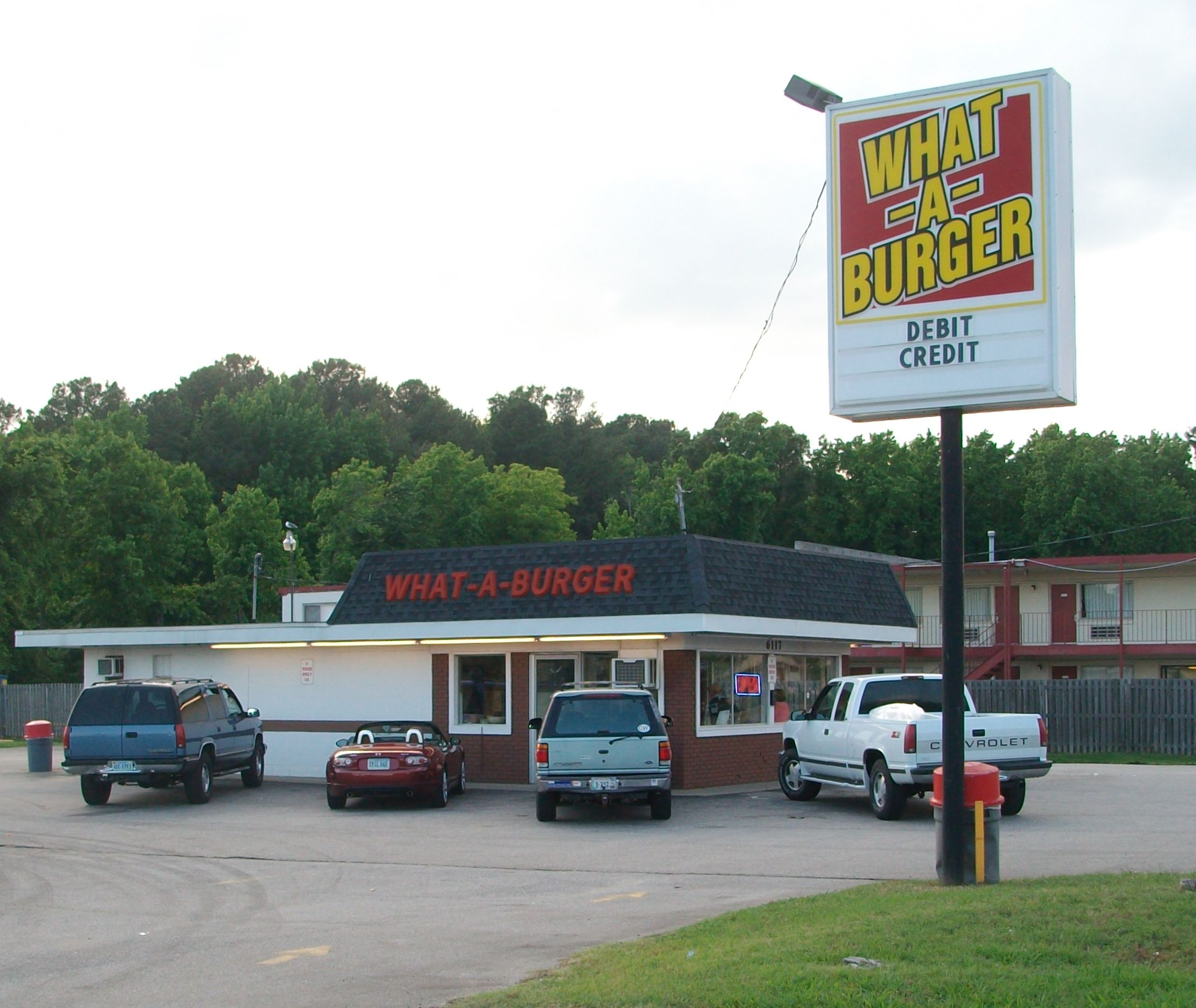
What-A-Burger on Jefferson Avenue in Newport News, Virginia, in May 2010. It is located just west of the former Newport News Circle, which was the site of the very first What-A-Burger, which was opened by Jack Branch in 1957 and operated by his brother, Paul E. Branch, Jr. May 2010 photo

The first Virginia store opened in 1957 by entrepreneur Jack Branch near Newport News, Virginia.

Newport News Circle was a busy intersection located at Jefferson Avenue and U.S. Route 258 governed by a traffic circle (aka "rotary") in the former Warwick County. (Warwick County later became politically consolidated with the City of Newport News, assuming the latter's better-known name). U.S. Route 258, later known as Mercury Boulevard in honor of the astronauts of Project Mercury at NASA's center at nearby Langley Air Force Base, led from Fort Monroe to the James River Bridge and has been a major traffic artery in the area for many years. Jefferson Avenue at the time carried Virginia Route 168, which led from Anderson's Corner on U.S. Route 60 west of Colonial Williamsburg to the harbor near Newport News Point, where traffic long crossed Hampton Roads by means of an automobile-carrying ferry (later using the Hampton Roads Bridge-Tunnel). It was a very busy location, especially in the era after World War II and before the U.S. Interstate Highway System was created.

Branch's original location on the traffic circle was operated by his brother, Paul E. Branch, Jr., and was moved some years later to another location slightly west of the former traffic circle after a highway modernization project took place. That store is continuing business as of April 2015.

Founder Branch later was involved in establishing additional stores in the independent cities of Richmond, Colonial Heights and Petersburg, Virginia, as well as one in South Carolina. The other Virginia stores were located along U.S. Route 1 (Virginia), a major through traffic corridor in the years before Interstate 95 was built. In addition to the U.S. Route 1 locations another Richmond location was added on State Route 161 in Richmond. (Route 161 was touted as a western bypass of Richmond's Lee Bridge in its early pre-Interstate Highway years, using the privately owned Boulevard Bridge to cross the James River.

== Locations ==
As noted above, the first What-a-Burger is still in operation at 6117 Jefferson Ave. in Newport News, Virginia, just west of its original location.

Other locations in the Richmond-Petersburg area have closed. The store located at 1018 Boulevard in Colonial Heights, Virginia, closed in 2015. A more modern location was opened off Puddledock Rd. just beyond the city limits of Colonial Heights in Prince George, Virginia, in 2013 and likely contributed to the closing of the older restaurant. One of the oldest locations, at 909 Jefferson Davis Hwy. in Richmond, Virginia, which in recent years operated under the names "BJ's Big Burger" and "BJ's What-a-Burger," is also closed; however, the locations at 9901 Jefferson Davis Hwy. in Chesterfield County, Virginia, and at 2350 W Washington St. in Petersburg, Virginia, remain open.

A sister restaurant, loosely affiliated with What-a-Burger and serving a similar, if not identical, menu, operates under the name Roy's Big Burger and is located at 5200 Lakeside Ave. in Richmond, Virginia. A Roy's Big Burger also formerly operated at 4108 Jefferson Davis Hwy. in Richmond, Virginia, but is now the location of a Mexican taqueria.

== Other What-A-Burgers ==
What-A-Burger restaurants (as well with other variations of the name) were formed by other entrepreneurs than the Branch family during the post-World War II period. For example, a small chain now based in Concord, North Carolina, was founded by Eb Bost & C.W. Bost, Jr. and operates as What-A-Burger Drive-Ins, Inc. with several locations, are all still under the leadership of members of their families. It also visibly numbered their stores starting from #1 in Kannapolis, North Carolina, to #15 in Concord.

The What-A-Burger restaurants in Virginia, North Carolina and South Carolina are not to be confused with the much larger Whataburger chain based in Texas. Harmon Dobson, a different entrepreneur, established a "Whataburger" restaurant in Texas on August 8, 1950. The Texas Secretary of State granted Dobson a "Whataburger" trademark in 1950, and he registered a federal trademark in 1957. The Texas business eventually became a corporation with as many as 800 "Whataburger" locations across the southern United States. The San Antonio, Texas–based chain's sales hit the $1 billion mark for the first time in 2007. However, notwithstanding the much larger size of the Texas-based chain, the locations of the chain were limited to Texas, Alabama, Arizona, Arkansas, Florida, Georgia, Louisiana, Mississippi, New Mexico, Missouri, Kansas and Oklahoma. The company does not have any locations in the Carolinas or Virginia. However, Whataburger has announced plans for three Charlotte locations, three Triangle locations, and nine South Carolina locations.

== Signature food ==
What-A-Burger locations are notable for their large burgers (in comparison with normal fast-food fare). They offer more limited menus than many larger chains. Food is generally cooked to order within sight of waiting customers.

Despite being largely bypassed by through traffic using the Interstate Highway System, the Branch family locations in the Richmond-Petersburg and Newport News areas thrived, building a local and loyal following, especially at lunch hours. Reviewers commenting online in both the Richmond and Newport News areas noted many years of their patronage. A recent review in the State (Columbia, SC) newspaper's blog, following their local "Cheeseburger crawl" stated "You can order either the regular What-a-burger or the What-a-burger with cheese; ordering it "all the way" comes with mustard, onions, pickles, lettuce and tomato, although you can also add ketchup and mayo, or request grilled onions."

== Lawsuit: a larger chain, similar name ==
During the formative years, neither the Branch family nor Dobson and his associates were apparently aware of the existence of the other. A federal trademark infringement lawsuit between the two Virginia corporations in conflict with the Virginia-based corporations (What-A-Burger of Virginia, Inc. and What-A-Burger of Newport News, Inc.) and the chain based in Texas (Whataburger) was decided in 2004.

Based upon the evidence presented when the lawsuit was brought more than 50 years later, the founders, since deceased, apparently first became aware of each other's businesses in 1970. Representatives of the Texas chain told the courts during the federal lawsuit that the company had no plans for expansion into Virginia. (Neither the North Carolina–based What-A-Burger chain nor any of the many others with similar names was a party to this lawsuit).

At the conclusion of the 2003–2004 legal action, the court found that "no actionable damages had occurred" or were likely to for either party and that there is no reasonable public confusion: "There is no evidence—nor can we imagine any—that consumers are currently likely to be confused about whether the burgers served by Virginia W-A-B come from Texas or Virginia."

== See also ==
- List of hamburger restaurants
