= Buck Weaver (American football) =

American football player (1905–1967)

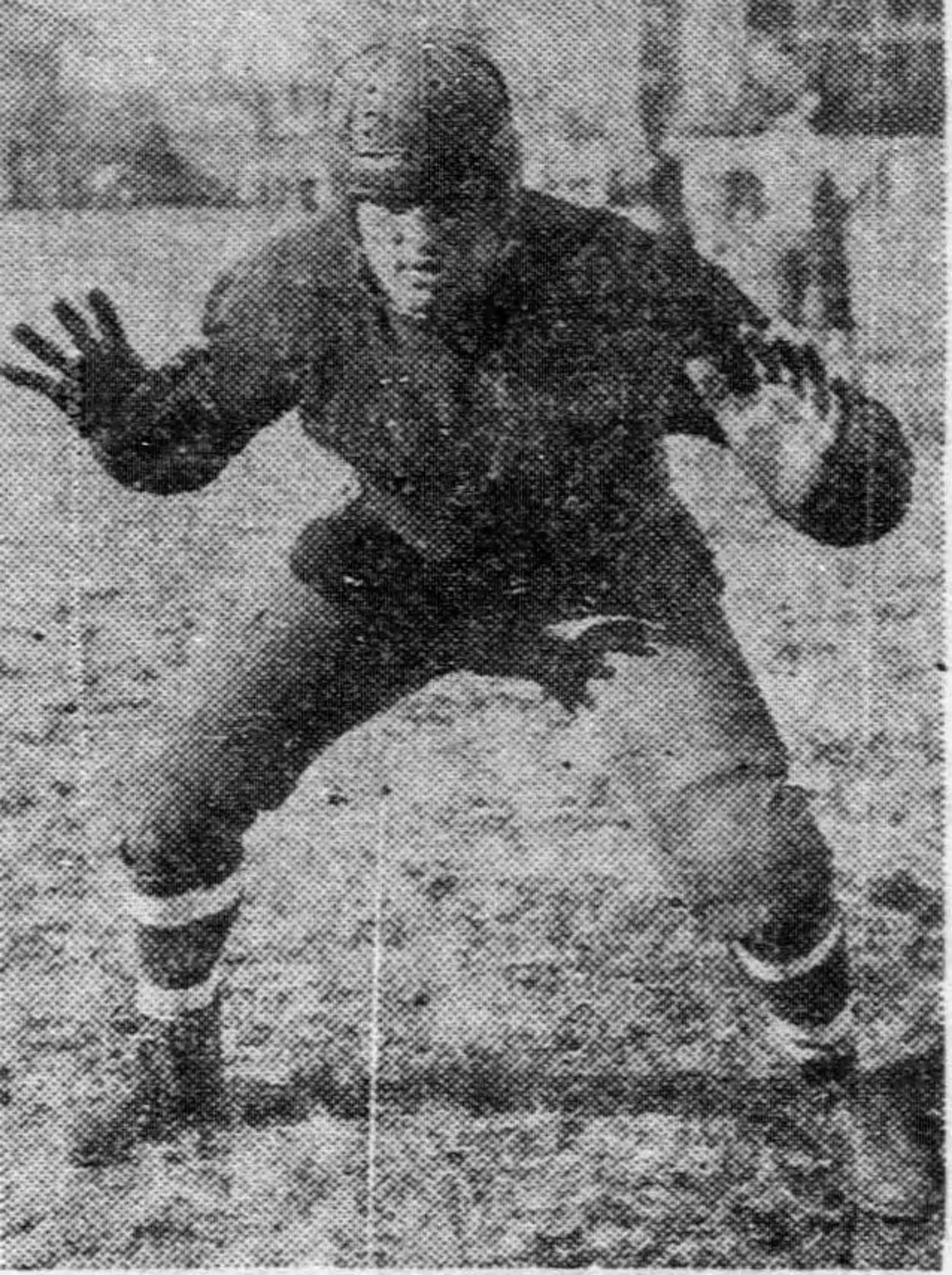

Profile
- Position: Guard

Personal information
- Born: November 1, 1905; Cushman, Arkansas, U.S.
- Died: September 11, 1967 (aged 61)
- Listed height: 6 ft 4 in (1.93 m)
- Listed weight: 235 lb (107 kg)

Career information
- High school: Jonesboro (AR)
- College: Chicago

Career history
- Chicago Cardinals (1930); Portsmouth Spartans (1930)
- Stats at Pro Football Reference

Charles Austin Weaver (November 1, 1905 – September 11, 1967) was an American football player.

Weaver was born in 1905 at Cushman, Arkansas, and attended high school in Jonesboro, Arkansas. He played college football at the tackle position for the University of Chicago from 1926 to 1929. At the time, he was the larguest man to try out for a Chicago team at 6 feet 4 inches and 240 pounds. He was also a track star at the University of Chicago.

He also played professional football in the National Football League (NFL) as a guard and end for the Chicago Cardinals and Portsmouth Spartans, both during the 1930 season. He appeared in ten NFL games, four as a starter.

Weaver was married in December 1930 to Mabel Allene Steele. died in 1967 in Orange County, Florida.
