= Skip Rutherford =

American nonprofit executive and academic administrator

- Born: James Luin Rutherford III; January 28, 1950 (age 76); Memphis, Tennessee, US
- Education: Batesville High School
- Alma mater: University of Arkansas
- Occupations: Non-profit executive, academic administrator
- Known for: Founding president, Clinton Foundation
- Spouse: Billie Rutherford
- Children: 3

James Luin "Skip" Rutherford III (born January 28, 1950) is an American non-profit executive and academic administrator. He was the first president of the Clinton Foundation, and was the Dean of the University of Arkansas Clinton School of Public Service from April 2006 until June 2021.

== Early life ==
James Luin Rutherford III was born on January 28, 1950, in Memphis, Tennessee. He is the only child of James Luin Rutherford Jr (1921-2014), a banker and landowner, and his wife Kathleen Rutherford (née Roberson). Rutherford was brought up in Batesville, Arkansas, and educated at Batesville High School. Rutherford received a bachelor's degree from the University of Arkansas, where he was editor of their student newspaper, The Arkansas Traveler, in 1971–72.

== Career ==
In 1992, he was a key advisor on Bill Clinton's presidential campaign.

In 1997 he became the first president of the Clinton Foundation, and was still heading the board at the end of 2004, when the other directors were Senator David Pryor, Ann Jordan, Terrence McAuliffe, and Cheryl Mills.

In 2006, Rutherford was chairman of the Clinton Foundation, executive vice president of Cranford Johnson Robinson Woods, a communications firm in Little Rock, and a visiting professor at the University of Central Arkansas.

Rutherford was the Dean of the University of Arkansas Clinton School of Public Service from April 2006, when he succeeded Senator David Pryor, until his retirement in 2021.

== Personal life ==
Rutherford and his wife Billie have three children.
