= Whataburger =

American fast food restaurant chain

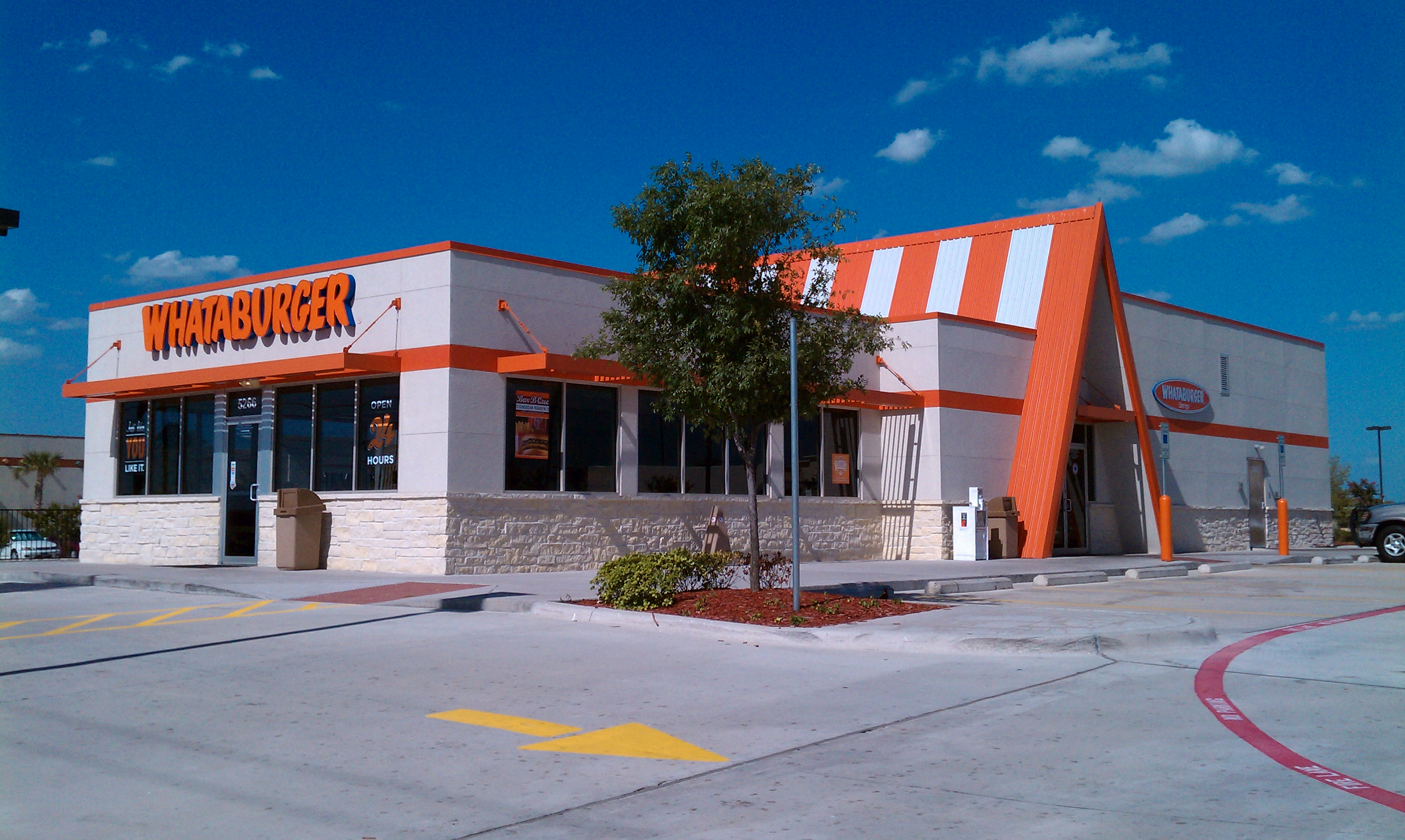
- Whataburger in Frisco, Texas
- Type: Private
- Industry: Restaurant
- Genre: Fast food
- Founded: August 8, 1950; 76 years ago in Corpus Christi, Texas, U.S.
- Founder: Harmon Dobson, Paul Burton
- Headquarters: San Antonio, Texas, U.S.
- Number of locations: 1211 (2026)
- Area served: Texas, Arizona, Arkansas, New Mexico, Oklahoma, Florida, Georgia, Missouri, Kansas, Nevada, Colorado, Tennessee, Alabama, North Carolina, South Carolina, Mississippi, and Louisiana
- Key people: Debbie Stroud (CEO); COO); Elena Kraus (EVP & CLO); Rich Scheffler (EVP & CMO); James Turcotte (EVP & CDO); Janelle Sykes (EVP & CFO); Peggy Rubenzer (SVP & CPO); Alexander Ivannikov (EVP & CAO); Joe Shannon (SVP & CIO)
- Products: Hamburgers; Chicken sandwiches; French fries; Milkshakes
- Revenue: ▲$3.340 billion (2022)
- Owner: BDT & MSD Partners (majority); Dobson family (minority)
- Number of employees: 43,000 (2021)
- Website: whataburger.com

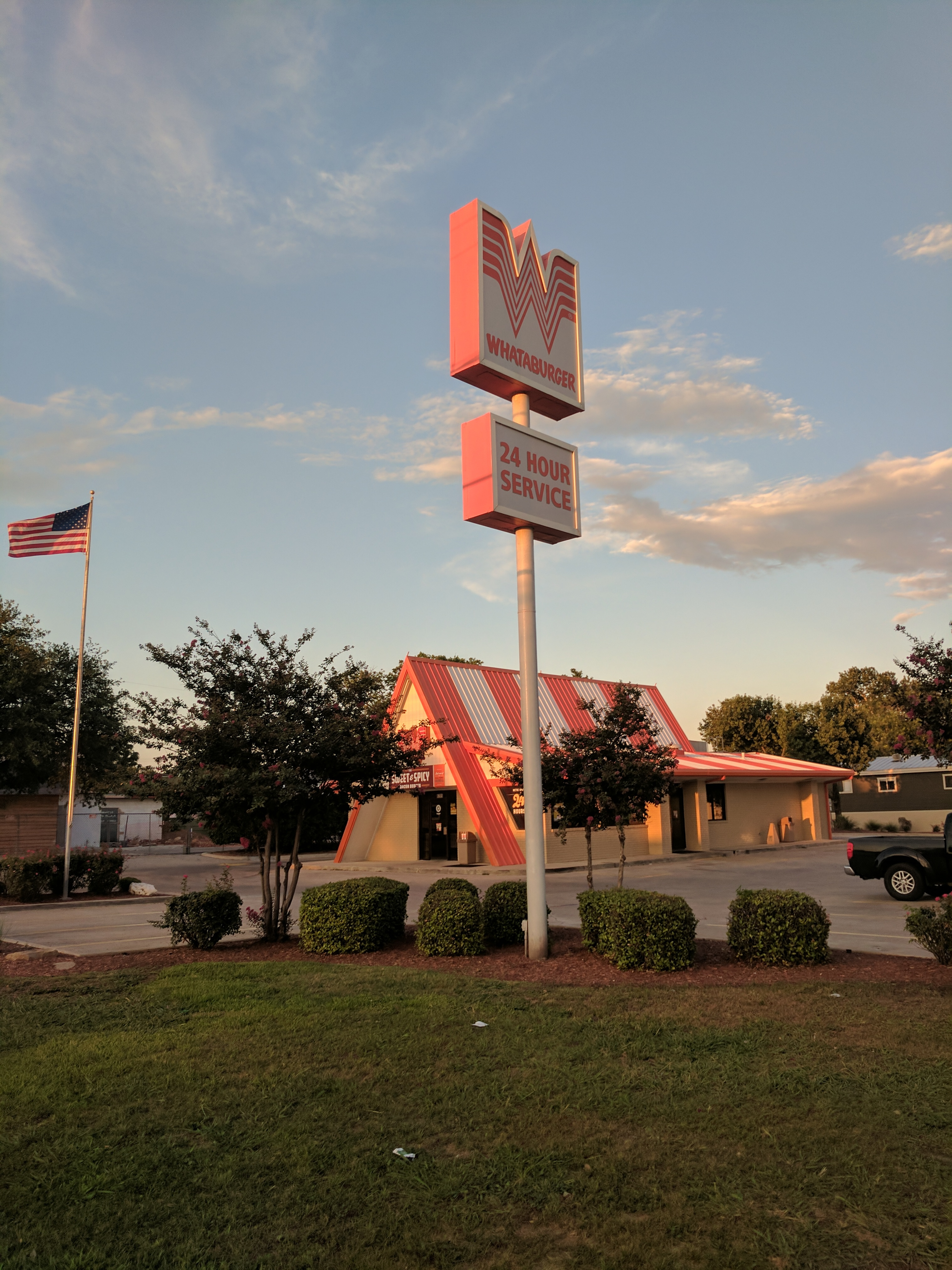
Whataburger restaurant in Austin, Texas

Whataburger is an American regional fast food restaurant chain, headquartered and based in San Antonio, Texas, that specializes in hamburgers. Founded by Harmon Dobson and Paul Burton, it opened its first restaurant in Corpus Christi, Texas in 1950. Family-owned by the Dobsons until 2019, the chain is now managed by the private equity firm BDT Capital Partners; the Dobson family still holds a small stake.

When the company changed ownership in 2019, there were more than 670 locations in Texas and over 150 in New Mexico, Arizona, Colorado, and the Southern United States, of which 126 are franchised.

Whataburger was known for many years for its distinct A-framed orange-and-white-stripe-roofed buildings. The first A-frame restaurant, the 24th Whataburger to open, was built in Odessa, Texas in 1961. Although the company highlighted the restaurant as an unofficial historical landmark, it was demolished in 2019 and replaced by a new building.

The company's focus is on ground beef burgers, and includes the Whataburger, the Whataburger Jr., the Triple Meat Whataburger, the Bacon & Cheese Whataburger, and the Justaburger. Non-beef options, such as the Whatachick'n, are also available. Breakfast is served during morning hours, including biscuits, pork sausage, bacon, and eggs.

== History ==
=== Early years ===
In 1950, Harmon Dobson and Paul Burton were looking to open a hamburger restaurant. Dobson's goal was to "make a better burger that took two hands to hold and tasted so good that when you took a bite you would say 'What a burger!'" In June 1950, Dobson was granted the Whataburger trademark. In August of that year they opened their first location on Ayers Street in Corpus Christi, Texas, across from Del Mar College. The store's 25-cent hamburger, called simply the Whataburger, consisted of a quarter-pound hamburger patty on a wide bun with "fresh lettuce, three slices of tomato, four dill pickles, [and] chopped onions," as well as ketchup and mustard. (The recipe would remain largely unchanged, although ketchup was later removed.) Soft drinks and chips were also sold.

In 1951, Burton and Dobson ended their partnership after arguments concerning Dobson's price raise of the burger from 25 to 30 cents. Burton settled with owning the Whataburger franchises in San Antonio, Texas. Months later, prices for burgers were raised to 35 cents. In 1952, Dobson opened a location in Kingsville, Texas, the first store outside of Corpus Christi. In 1953, Joe Andrews, Sr. became the first non-founder franchise owner with a location in Alice, Texas. In 1959, the first Whataburger restaurant outside Texas opened in Pensacola, Florida.

=== 1960s and 1970s ===
By 1960, there were stores operating across Texas, Florida, and Tennessee. Inspired by his love for flying, Dobson designed the orange and white striped A-frame store in Odessa, Texas, in 1961. In 1962, the company added French fries and hot pies to its menu. In 1963, it expanded to Arizona and totaled 26 stores. In 1965, it estimated selling 15,000 burgers daily in the Texas Coastal Bend area. In 1967, the company commissioned the "Flying W" company logo, and the company had expanded to 40 restaurants in four states.

On April 11, 1967, Dobson and an associate died in an airplane crash, and Dobson's widow, Grace, took control of the business. In 1969, Grace became chairman of the board. In 1971, the company opened its first drive-through store, and in 1972, it opened its 100th store. In 1974, the A-frame design was changed to a "Modern A-Frame" to accommodate drive-thrus and larger dining rooms.

=== 1980s and 1990s ===
In 1980, the company opened its 300th store. In 1982, three Corpus Christi stores began 24/7 service. In 1983, the company added Breakfast on a Bun, the Whatachick'n sandwich and breakfast taquitos to its menu. In 1987, it opened its 400th store, and also shut down operations in California.

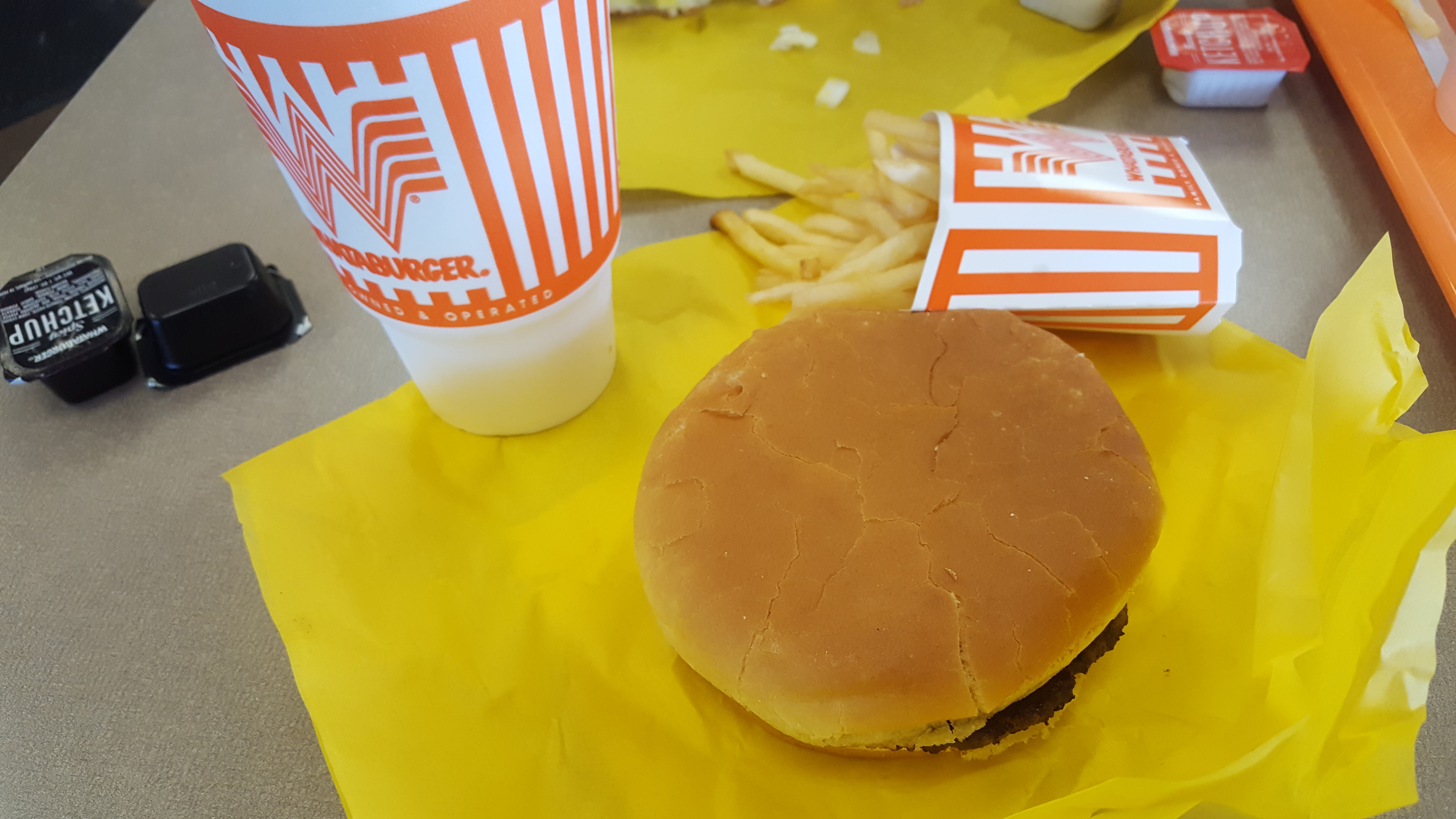
A hamburger, french fries, and a soft drink at a Whataburger in College Station, Texas

In 1993, Harmon and Grace Dobson's son, Tom, became the CEO and President. The menu expanded, offering Whatameal packages, cookies and biscuits, and chicken strips. The company celebrated its 500th store opening in 1995, and was noted as the country's eighth-largest hamburger chain.

On May 6, 1999, the company opened "Whataburger by the Bay" on Shoreline Blvd in Corpus Christi. It is the largest Whataburger store at 6,000 square feet (560 m^{2}). The site includes a life-size bronze statue of Harmon Dobson.

A Whataburger facility, complete with familiar a-frame design and the company logo, appeared routinely in the popular animated TV series King of the Hill.

=== 2000–present ===
On August 8, 2000, Whataburger celebrated its 50th anniversary with 575 operating stores. In 2001, during the 77th Texas Legislative Session, a bill was passed proclaiming Whataburger to be a Texas Treasure.

In 2003, it hired Austin-based advertising firm McGarrah Jessee, which created an advertising campaign featuring Ohio actor William Bassett. In 2007, the company achieved 700 stores in ten states with annual revenue of $1 billion.

In October 2011, the company changed its television ads from Bassett's voiceovers to "documentary-style ads employees and customers using their own words to describe what makes Whataburger special." By the end of the year, it had 728 stores operating in ten states. The Dobson family owned 611 stores, and the other "117 are owned and operated by about 25 franchisees."

On May 16, 2019, American City Business Journals reported that Whataburger confirmed it had hired Morgan Stanley for a possible sale of the company.

On June 14, 2019, the Dobson family sold its majority stake in the company to BDT Capital, a Chicago-based investment company. The family cited long term expansion plans as one reason for the sale. Much of the current leadership will remain, but they will take on new roles within the company. Ed Nelson, currently serving as chief financial officer and controller, was promoted to president. The company said that Whataburger's headquarters will remain in San Antonio.

On August 1, 2020, Ed Nelson was promoted to CEO of Whataburger.

Beginning in 2021, the company expanded to the Midwest with locations around the Kansas City metropolitan area and the Wichita, Kansas metropolitan area, with multiple locations in between the cities, and also as far north as St. Joseph On January 5, 2022, the first of 8 locations in Middle Tennessee opened in Hermitage, ending a decades long absence in the Nashville area.

In March 2022, Whataburger announced it would be opening locations in the Atlanta metropolitan area. The first one opened in November in Kennesaw.

In April 2023, the town of Flower Mound, Texas approved zoning for the first Whataburger in the city. At that time, Flower Mound was the largest city in Texas without a Whataburger.

As of May 2024, Whataburger has announced plans for six North Carolina locations and nine South Carolina locations.

== Retail products ==
Due to the success of selling Whataburger sauces at H-E-B since 2014, the company announced it will offer 1-pound packages of bacon at H-E-B and Central Market stores.

Whataburger sells its line of condiments in 14oz and 20oz squeeze bottles. It also sells jars of its picante sauce and salsa verde, as well as boxed pancake mix.

== Corporate affairs ==
=== Leadership and operations ===
Whataburger generated more than $3 billion in revenue in 2022 at more than 900 restaurant locations in 14 states, as well as from the sale of various retail products in grocery stores throughout the U.S. It employed approximately 50,000 people as of 2022. The company is led by president and CEO Ed Nelson, executive vice president and chief operating officer Debbie Stroud, executive vice president and chief marketing officer Rich Scheffler, executive vice president and chief legal officer Elena Kraus, executive vice president and chief financial officer Janelle Sykes, executive vice president and chief development officer James Turcotte, senior vice president and chief people officer Peggy Rubenzer, senior vice president and chief information officer Joe Shannon, and chief strategy and supply chain officer Alexander Ivannikov.

=== Headquarters and offices ===
In 2009 the company moved from its long time base in Corpus Christi to a new headquarters at 300 Concord Plaza Drive, a 140,000-square-foot (13,000 m^{2}) building in San Antonio.

Previously the corporate headquarters were in Corpus Christi with the regional offices in Corpus Christi, Houston, Irving, and Phoenix.

After Hurricane Ike hit the Texas Coast in 2008, the company began considering moving its headquarters from Corpus Christi. On Friday November 21, 2008, the company announced it was permanently moving to San Antonio, and that the Corpus Christi office would remain open indefinitely to help ease the transition. The company chose San Antonio because of a larger talent pool for potential employees, increased protection from hurricanes, and cost-efficient office space.

In March 2009 the company purchased the Concord Plaza development from HDG Mansur. The company stated that it chose Concord Plaza for its proximity to neighborhoods and schools attractive to its employees, and its proximity to San Antonio International Airport. Tesoro, which leased space in the development, was moving to another facility at the time Whataburger bought the building. Whataburger planned to move 250 of its corporate positions to San Antonio, with over 60% of the employees coming from Corpus Christi and the rest hired locally.

== What-A-Burger and similar stores ==
Whataburger is sometimes confused with the What-A-Burger (hyphenated) chain of family-operated restaurants in Virginia, North Carolina, and South Carolina. The first What-A-Burger store opened in 1950 by entrepreneur Jack Branch near Newport News, Virginia, at Newport News Circle (intersection of Jefferson Avenue and U.S. Route 258) in the former Warwick County. What-A-Burger and Whataburger were unaware of each other's existence several states apart until around 1970, when there was some correspondence. However, no legal actions took place until 2002–2003, when both companies sued each other over the alleged trademark infringement. The Court of Appeals, in 2004, eventually decided the Texas Whataburger had a legitimate trademark; but the Virginia chain did not harm the much larger Texas-based chain in any way or cause any reasonable public confusion: "There is no evidence — nor can we imagine any — that consumers are currently likely to be confused about whether the burgers served by Virginia W-A-B come from Texas or Virginia."

A second restaurant chain based in North Carolina, named What-A-Burger Drive-In, owned by Eb and Michael Bost, was not a party to the lawsuit, but under case law procedures, it would also retain its name. It visibly numbered their stores starting from #1 in Kannapolis, North Carolina, to #15 in Concord, North Carolina, six of which remain in operation as of March 2009. The Texas chain filed suit in federal court June 11, 2024 after its announcement that it would add North Carolina locations. The suit alleges three restaurants located in Mount Pleasant, Norwood, North Carolina and Raleigh in North Carolina started using the name "What-A-Burger #13" after the Texas chain's copyright registration.

There is also an unrelated local restaurant also called What-A-Burger in West Columbia, South Carolina founded in 1953.

== Sponsorships ==
Whataburger has sponsored a variety of music festivals. The company has also sponsored sports through the Whataburger Sports Complex in Kilgore, Texas, the Arizona Soccer Association, and David Starr Racing, among others.

In June 2024, Whataburger signed an endorsement deal with Bobby Witt Jr., the Texas-native shortstop for the Kansas City Royals; the 2024 MLB batting champion served as a prominent brand ambassador for Whataburger. On 14 December 2024, a pop-up replica of Whataburger rebranded as “Wittaburger”, was present at the wedding reception of Bobby Witt Jr. and his wife Maggie Black.

== Gallery ==
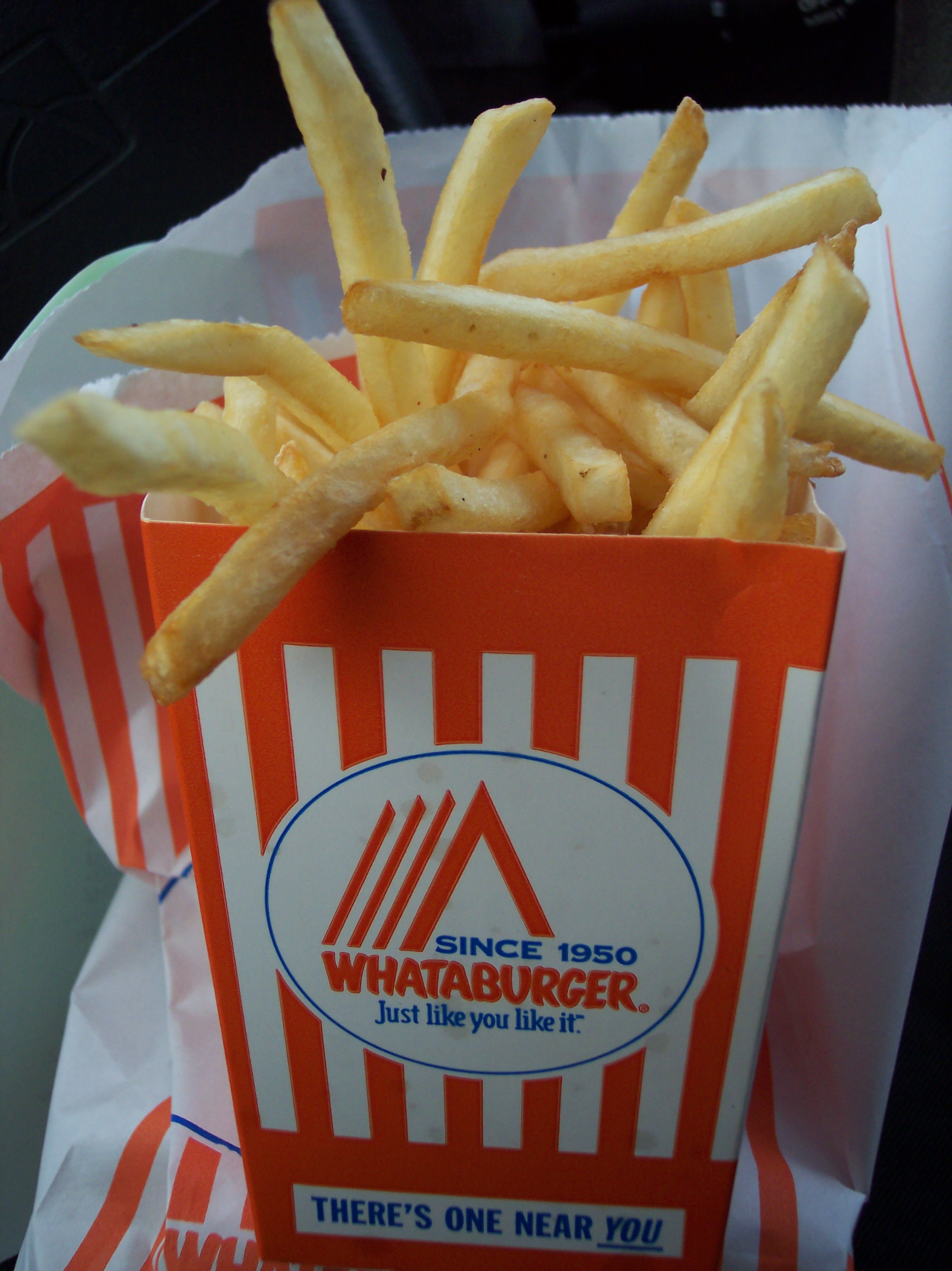
Whataburger French fries

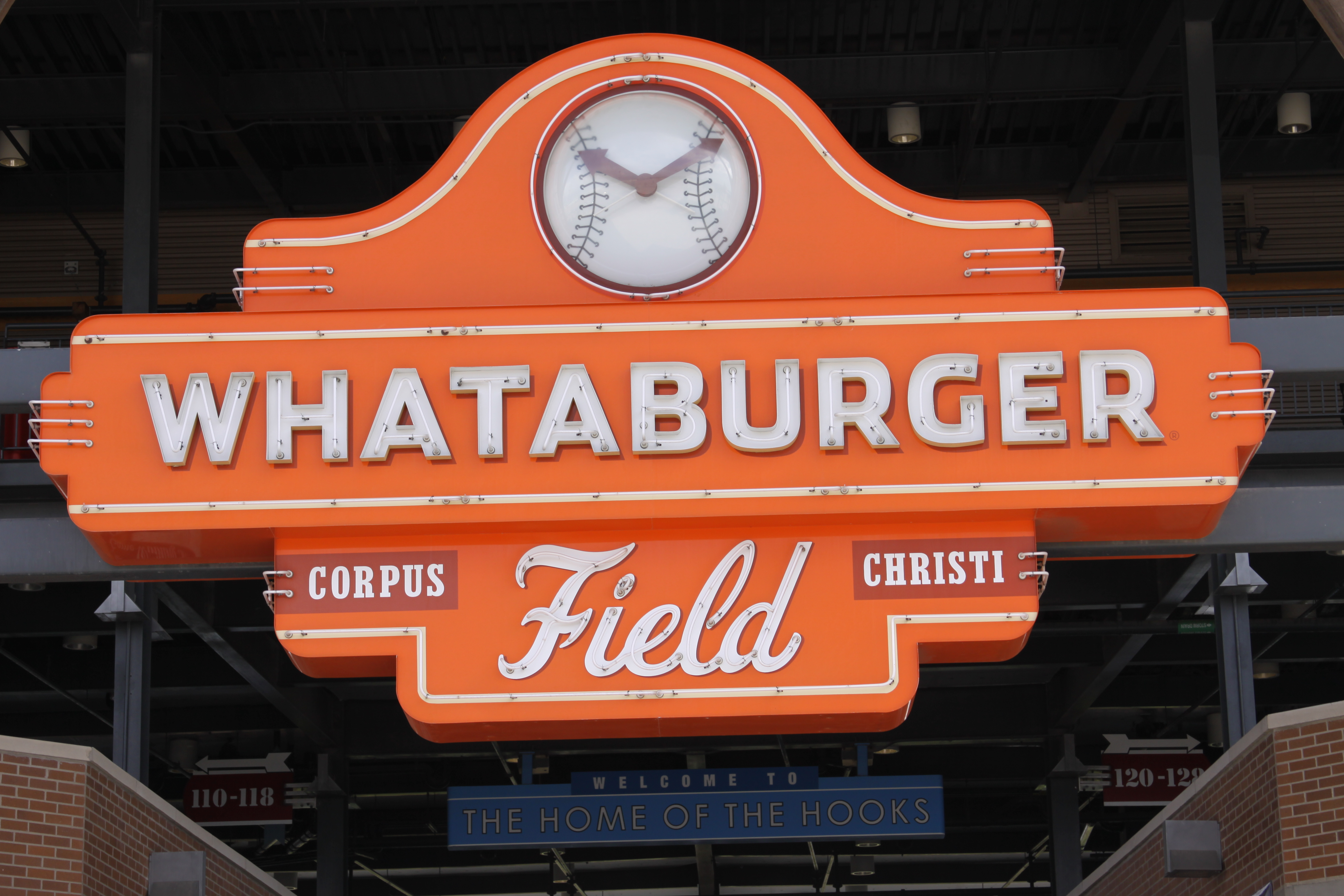
Whataburger Field sign in Corpus Christi, Texas

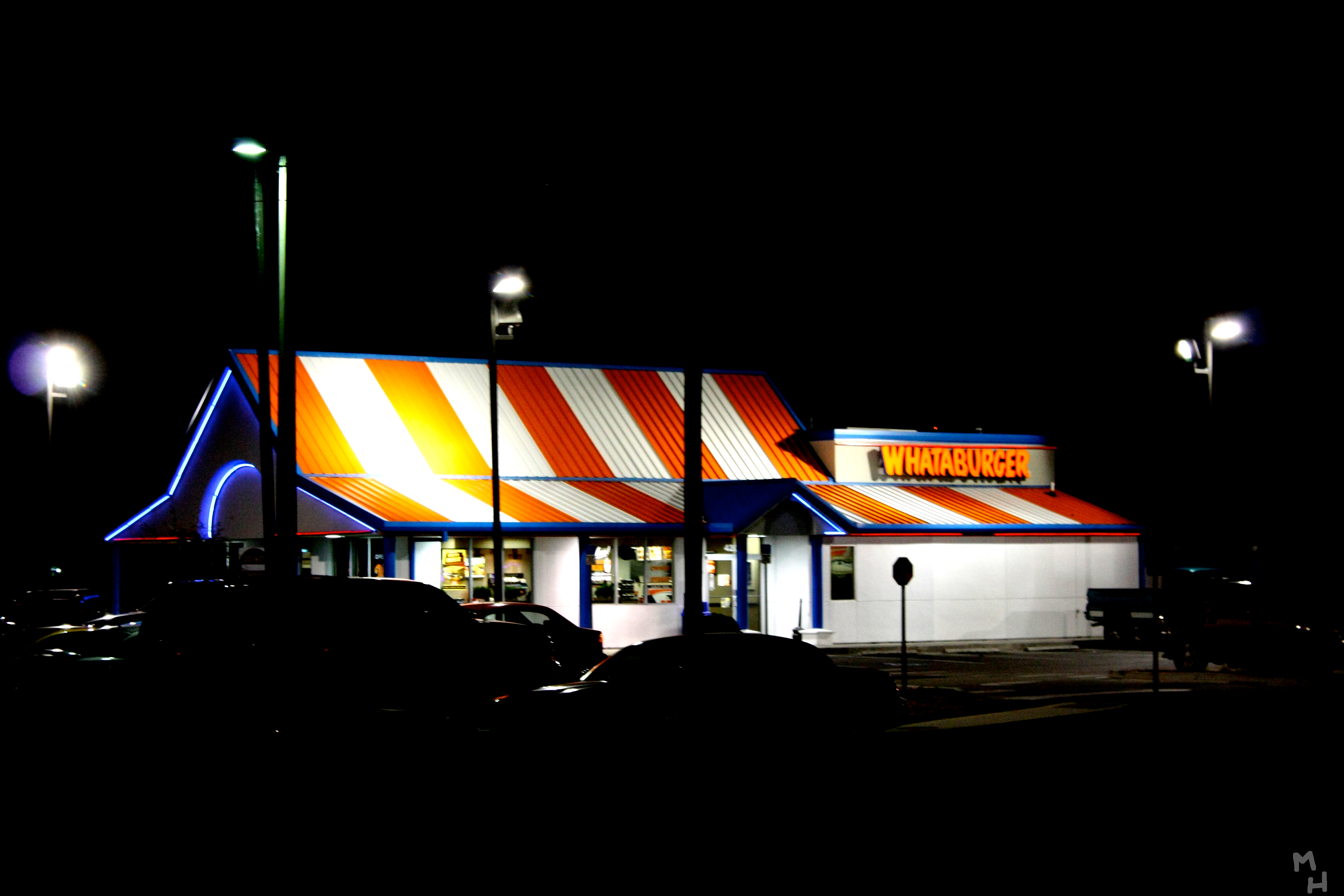
Whataburger restaurant at night

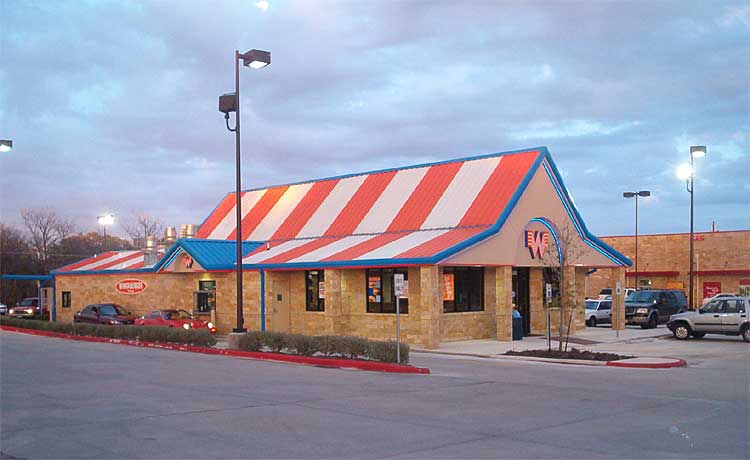
A Whataburger in Austin, Texas

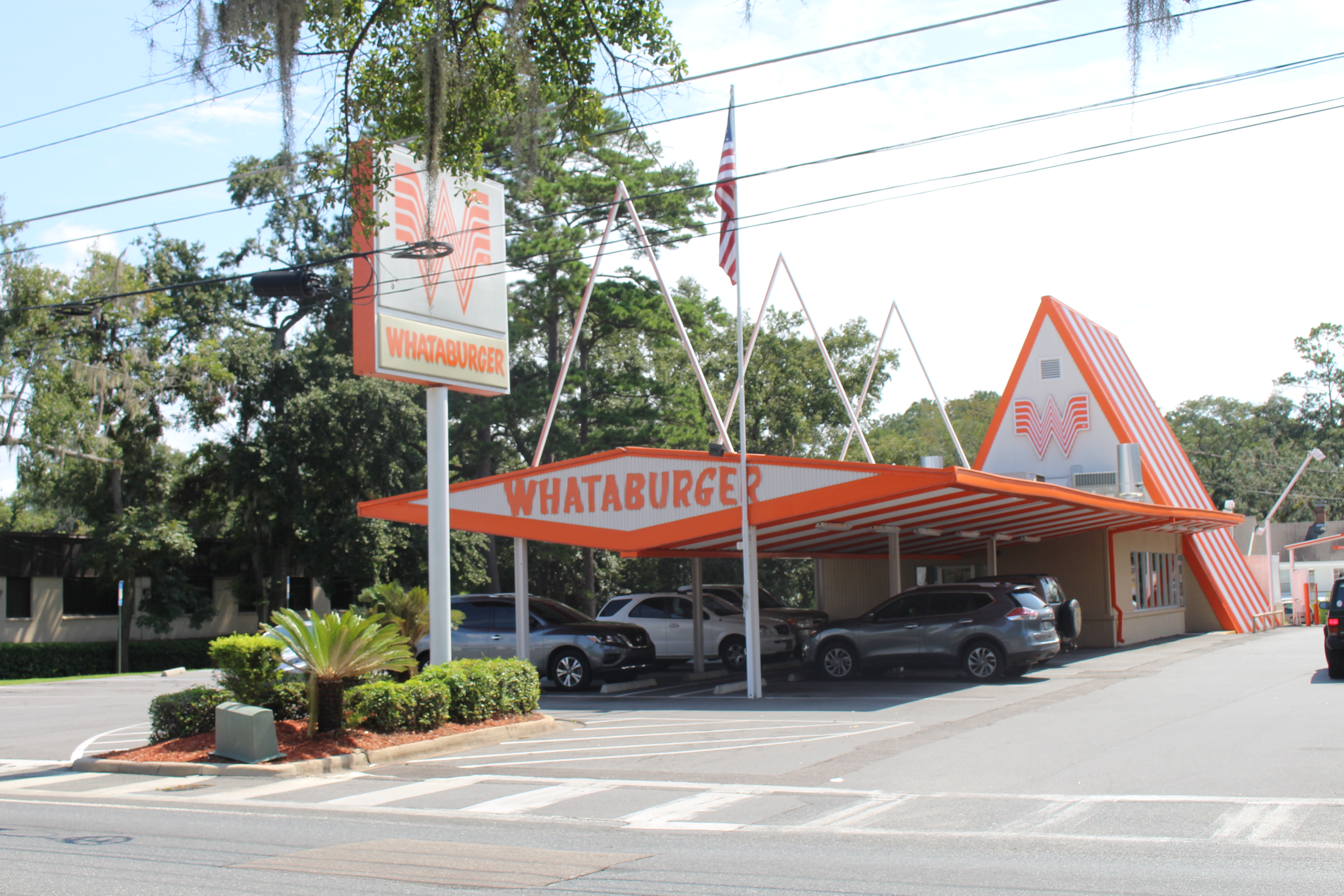
Thomasville Road, Tallahassee

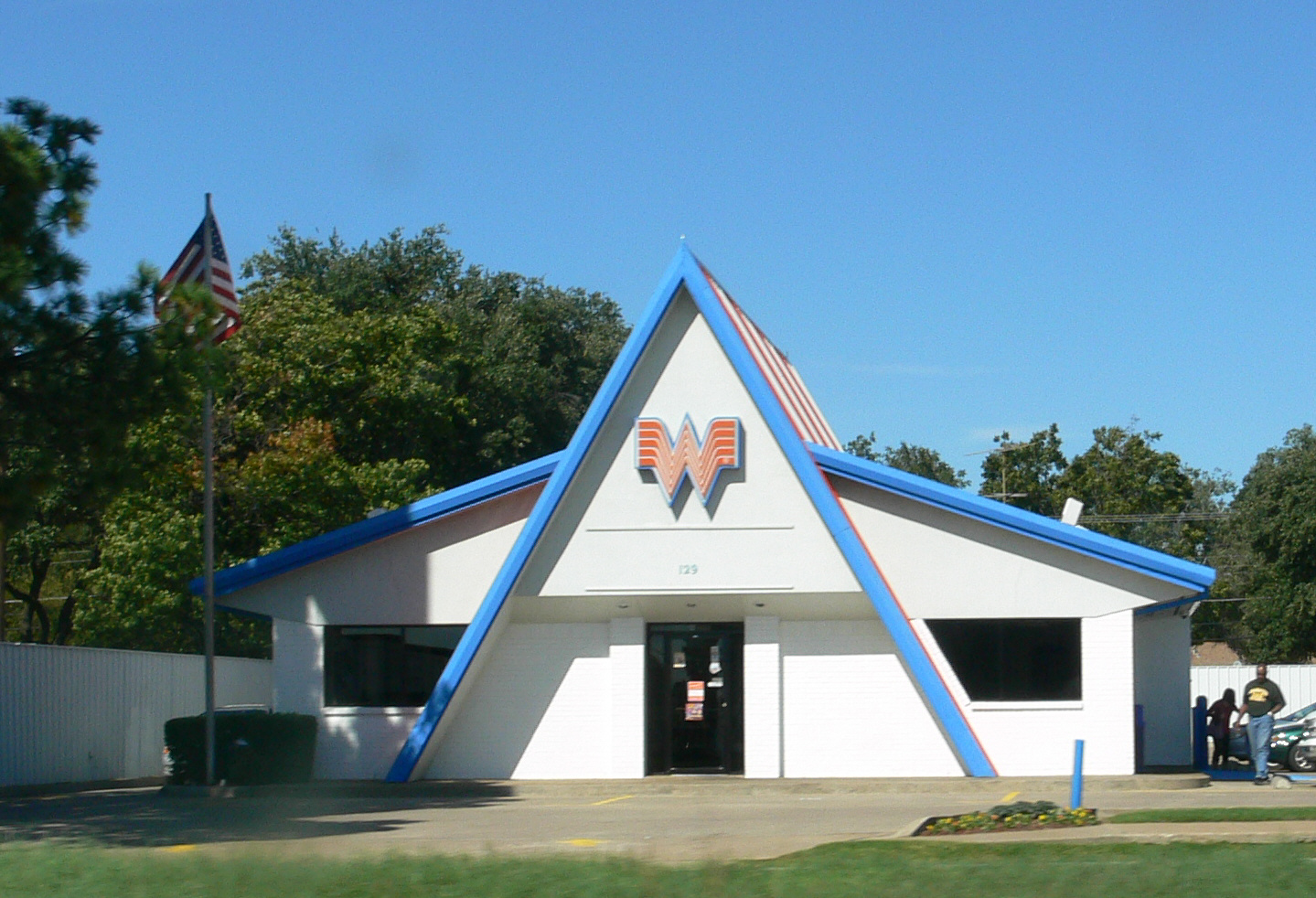
Irving, Texas

== See also ==
- Whataburger Field, home of the Corpus Christi Hooks
- List of hamburger restaurants
