= Sulphur Rock, Arkansas =

- Town
- Location of Sulphur Rock in Independence County, Arkansas
- Coordinates: 35°45′09″N 91°30′03″W
- Country: United States
- State: Arkansas
- County: Independence

Area
  - Total: 1.25 sq mi (3.24 km^{2})
  - Land: 1.25 sq mi (3.24 km^{2})
  - Water: 0 sq mi (0.00 km^{2})
- Elevation: 325 ft (99 m)

Population (2020)
  - Total: 609
  - Estimate (2025): 655 ▲
  - Density: 487.1/sq mi (188.07/km^{2})
- Time zone: UTC-6 (Central (CST))
  - Summer (DST): UTC-5 (CDT)
- ZIP code: 72579
- Area code: 870
- FIPS code: 05-67730
- GNIS feature ID: 2406680

Sulphur Rock is a town in Independence County, Arkansas, United States. As of the 2020 census, Sulphur Rock had a population of 609.

== Geography ==
Sulphur Rock is located approximately six miles east of Batesville along Arkansas Highway 69 and about four miles north of the White River. Magness and Newark lie about four and six miles respectively to the southeast along Route 69.

According to the United States Census Bureau, the town has a total area of 1.3 square miles (3.3 km^{2}), all land.

=== List Of Highways ===
- Arkansas Highway 69
- Arkansas Highway 69 Business
- Arkansas Highway 233

== History ==
The last regular mule-drawn tram line in the United States was the Sulphur Rock Railway, which closed down in 1926.

== Demographics ==
Historical population
| Census | Pop. | Note | %± |
|---|---|---|---|
| 1880 | 188 | | — |
| 1890 | 387 | | 105.9% |
| 1900 | 213 | | −45.0% |
| 1910 | 252 | | 18.3% |
| 1920 | 227 | | −9.9% |
| 1930 | 177 | | −22.0% |
| 1940 | 181 | | 2.3% |
| 1950 | 179 | | −1.1% |
| 1960 | 225 | | 25.7% |
| 1970 | 290 | | 28.9% |
| 1980 | 316 | | 9.0% |
| 1990 | 356 | | 12.7% |
| 2000 | 421 | | 18.3% |
| 2010 | 456 | | 8.3% |
| 2020 | 609 | | 33.6% |
| 2025 (est.) | 655 | ▲ | 7.6% |
U.S. Decennial Census

As of the census of 2000, there were 421 people, 169 households, and 113 families residing in the town. The population density was 127.0/km^{2} (328.6/mi^{2}). There were 178 housing units at an average density of 53.7/km^{2} (138.9/mi^{2}). The racial makeup of the town was 97.39% White, and 2.61% from two or more races. 2.14% of the population were Hispanic or Latino of any race.

There were 169 households, out of which 28.4% had children under the age of 18 living with them, 56.8% were married couples living together, 8.3% had a female householder with no husband present, and 33.1% were non-families. 29.6% of all households were made up of individuals, and 21.3% had someone living alone who was 65 years of age or older. The average household size was 2.49 and the average family size was 3.09.

In the town, the population was spread out, with 25.9% under the age of 18, 9.3% from 18 to 24, 24.5% from 25 to 44, 23.8% from 45 to 64, and 16.6% who were 65 years of age or older. The median age was 38 years. For every 100 females, there were 95.8 males. For every 100 females age 18 and over, there were 91.4 males.

The median income for a household in the town was $30,000, and the median income for a family was $37,375. Males had a median income of $25,417 versus $17,426 for females. The per capita income for the town was $13,309. About 6.3% of families and 10.6% of the population were below the poverty line, including 9.6% of those under age 18 and 31.3% of those age 65 or over.

== Education ==
Batesville School District serves the community. Sulphur Rock School District consolidated into the Batesville district on July 1, 2005.

Batesville High School is the Batesville district's sole comprehensive high school.
