= Clinton School of Public Service =

Public administration school of the University of Arkansas

Coordinates: 34°44′47″N 92°15′30″W

University of Arkansas Clinton School of Public Service
- Type: Public
- Established: 2004
- Dean: Victoria DeFrancesco Soto
- Students: 90
- Location: Little Rock, Arkansas, United States Of America
- Campus: Clinton Presidential Center
- Website: clintonschool.uasys.edu
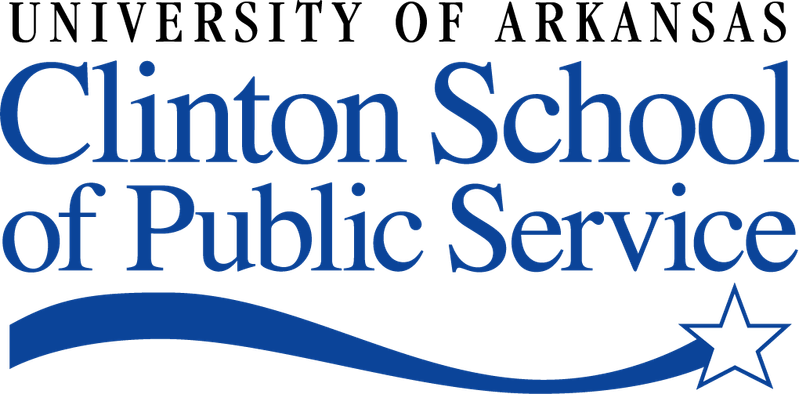

The University of Arkansas Clinton School of Public Service is a branch of the University of Arkansas system and is the newest of the presidential schools. It is located on the grounds of the Clinton Presidential Center in Little Rock. The school is housed in the Choctaw Route Station, a former Chicago, Rock Island and Pacific Railroad station built in 1899.

Former Senator and Governor David Pryor was named as the school's first dean. He stepped down from his position as dean in February 2006 but retained the title and active position of Founding Dean. Skip Rutherford was appointed to succeed David Pryor and was named dean on April 12, 2006, and served until June 30, 2021. University of Arkansas System President Dr. Donald R. Bobbitt announced his recommendation of Dr. Victoria M. DeFrancesco Soto as the school's next dean on September 7, 2021.

== Master of Public Service Program ==
The Clinton School is a graduate school offering its students a Master of Public Service degree. The program is described as a "two-year graduate program with a 'real world' curriculum." The mission of the school is "to educate and prepare individuals for public service, incorporating a strategic vision, an authentic voice, and a commitment to the common good." The program is unique within the presidential schools for its emphasis on practical courses, which include a practicum, summer internship, and capstone project. The school is further unique for its emphasis on leadership for social change, preparing students to become leaders in the public, private, and non-profit sectors, as well as its emphasis on creating bridges among those sectors. The Clinton School emphasizes equity, as opposed to emphasizing efficiency in public administration schools and effectiveness in public policy schools.

== Public programs and publications ==
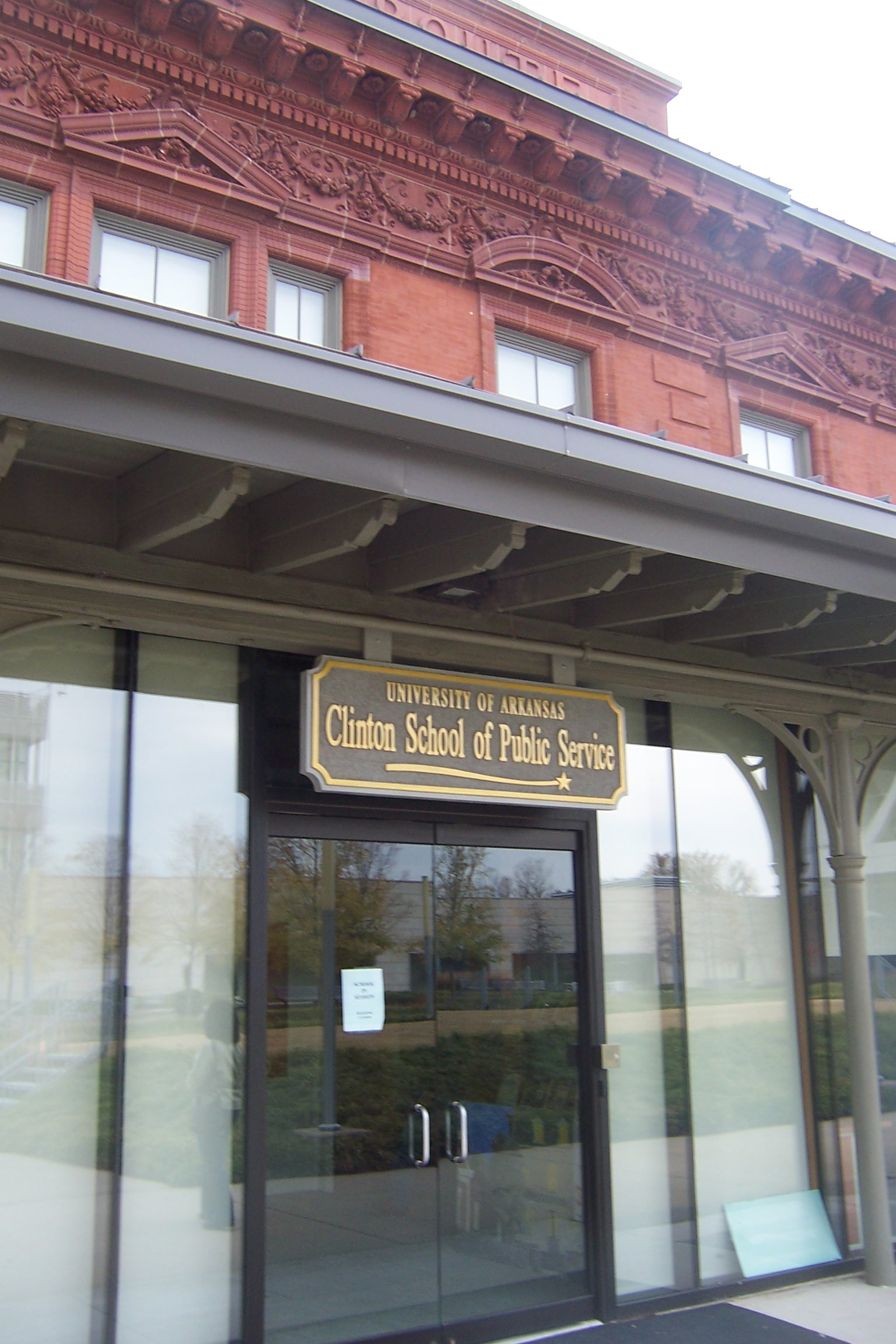
The Clinton School of Public Service building

The Clinton School releases a biannual publication called Frank: Academics for the Real World. The fall/winter 2007 inaugural issue of Frank was entitled “Has the Dream Arrived?” and focused on race relations in America. It included pieces by David Eisenhower, President Bill Clinton, Carlotta Walls Lanier, Karl Rove, The Rev. Jesse Jackson, Richard Dawkins, Simon Cowell, Eboo Patel, Aneesh Raman, and Antonio Villaraigosa.

=== Speaker series ===
Since 2004, the Clinton School hosts free public programs, guest lectures and community conversations featuring a wide range of internationally-prominent leaders and timely topics. Some notable speakers have included Henry Kissinger, Supreme Court Justice Stephen Breyer, Karl Rove, Alan Keyes, President Paul Kagame of Rwanda, John McCain, and Richard Dawkins. The series also screens films and documentaries and hosts panel discussions for every Arkansas Repertory Theatre production. Since its inaugural lecture from U.S. Senator Bob Dole, the school has hosted over one thousand events, including nine presidents and prime ministers, two Supreme Court justices, 22 Pulitzer Prize winners, 13 U.S. senators, 41 ambassadors, four Oscar winners, two astronauts and four NFL players, among others

All programs are free and open to the public, though more notable speakers sometimes requires advanced ticketing. The format of the speakers vary widely, and the school has made its public forums with Charles Ogletree, Judge Robert Carter, and John Edwards available to the Arkansas Educational Television Network, or AETN. Most of the series is recorded and available to the public from the Clinton School's website.

In addition to the speaker series, the Clinton School has teamed with the William J. Clinton Foundation and the Kumpuris family to establish a distinguished lecture series at the Clinton Presidential Center. The Kumpuris Lecture Series inaugural address on August 7, 2007 was given by President Clinton. Other guest lecturers include James Baker, Sam Waterston, and Nobel Prize winner Wangari Maathai.

== Enrollment ==
The Clinton School admitted 16 students from around the globe in its inaugural class in 2005. Since then, the school has increased admission to about 50 students and has a current enrollment of about 90 students. The enrollment pattern is in keeping with the two other presidential schools that are coupled with presidential libraries. By comparison, the Lyndon B. Johnson School of Public Affairs started in 1970 with 18 students and now has 312; the George Bush School of Government and Public Service began in 1997 with 19 students and now has 125. Students who are enrolled in the Clinton School are encouraged to continue public service acts throughout the world. Many participants come from public service backgrounds and already have experience in the field. Some programs Clinton School students come from include the Peace Corps, AmeriCorps, and some have military and medical backgrounds.

== Notable alumni ==
- Vivian Flowers, Democratic member of the Arkansas House of Representatives for Jefferson County, since 2015; diversity officer at UAMS Medical Center in Little Rock
