= List of Arkansas state agencies =

The following list of Arkansas state agencies includes the various Arkansas government branches and divisions.

== Executive offices ==
- Arkansas Attorney General
- Arkansas Commissioner of State Lands
- Arkansas State Auditor
- Arkansas State Treasurer
- Office of the Governor
- Office of Lieutenant Governor
- Secretary of State of Arkansas

== Legislative Department ==
- Arkansas General Assembly
  - Arkansas House of Representatives
  - Arkansas Senate
- Arkansas Code Revision Commission

== Judicial Department ==
- Arkansas Supreme Court
  - Administrative Office of the Courts
  - Arkansas Access to Justice Commission
  - Arkansas Committee on Professional Conduct
  - Arkansas Judges and Lawyers Assistance Program (JLAP) Committee
  - Arkansas Judicial Discipline and Disability Commission
  - Arkansas Supreme Court Committee on Model Jury Instructions - Civil
  - Arkansas Supreme Court Commission on Children, Youth and Families
  - Arkansas Supreme Court Committee on Model Jury Instructions - Criminal
  - Board of Certified Court Reporter Examiners
  - Client Security Fund Committee
  - Committee on Automation
  - Committee on Child Support
  - Committee on Civil Practice
  - Committee on Criminal Practice
  - Committee on Security and Emergency Preparedness
  - Continuing Legal Education Board
  - District Court Resource Assessment Board
  - Professional Practicum Committee
  - State Bar of Arkansas
  - State Board of Law Examiners
  - Supreme Court Committee on the Unauthorized Practice of Law
- Arkansas Court of Appeals

=== Boards and commissions ===
- Arkansas Board of Certified Court Reporter Examiners
- Arkansas Code Revision Commission
- Arkansas Judicial Discipline and Disability Commission
- Arkansas Interest on Lawyers' Trust Account Foundation Board
- Arkansas State Board of Law Examiners

== Cabinet departments ==
Following reorganization in 2019, Arkansas state government's executive branch contains fifteen cabinet-level departments. Many formerly independent departments were consolidated as "divisions" under newly created departments under a shared services model. Licensing boards, advisory boards, and commissions dealing with topics under the departments' purview are listed under each department. The governor appoints members to these boards and commissions, and the boards work with the departments to achieve their function. Departments are responsible for maintaining documentation, hosting meetings, and providing staff resources as needed for boards and commissions listed as under their purview. Where specific boards or commissions direct individual divisions or offices, they are listed immediately below.

=== Department of Agriculture ===
- Office of the Arkansas Secretary of Agriculture
- Arkansas Department of Agriculture
  - Animal Health Division
  - Forestry Division
    - Rural Fire Protection (RFP) Program
    - Arkansas Firewise USA Program
    - Forest Inventory and Analysis (FIA) Program
  - Law Enforcement Section
  - Natural Resources Division
    - Conservation Section
    - Water Management Section
    - Water Resources Development Section
  - Plant Industries Division
    - Bureau of Standards
    - Inspection Services Section
    - Pesticide Section
    - Quality Control and Compliance (QCC) Section
    - Regulatory Services Section
  - Laboratory Services Section
    - Chemistry Laboratory
    - Metrology Laboratory
    - Patroleum Laboratory
    - Seed Laboratory
    - Veterinary Diagnostic Laboratory

==== Boards and commissions ====
- Arkansas Beef Council
- Arkansas Board of Animal Health
- Arkansas Catfish Promotion Board
- Arkansas Corn and Grain Sorghum Board
- Arkansas Forestry Commission
- Arkansas Natural Resources Commission
- Arkansas Rice Research and Promotion Board
- Arkansas Soybean Promotion Board
- Arkansas State Plant Board
  - Arkansas Boll Weevil Eradication Committee
- Arkansas Wheat Promotion Board

=== Department of Commerce ===
- Division of Aeronautics
  - Arkansas Aeronautics Commission
  - Arkansas Aviation and Aerospace Commission
- Division of Insurance
  - Arkansas Earthquake Authority Board
  - Arkansas Governmental Bonding Board
  - Rural Risk Underwriting Association
  - State Board of Embalmers, Funeral Directors, Cemeteries and Burial Services
- Division of Securities
- Division of Services for the Blind
  - Division of Services for the Blind Board
- Division of State Bank
- Division of Workforce Services
  - Arkansas Rehabilitation Services
  - Arkansas Appeal Tribunal
  - Arkansas Board of Review
  - Arkansas Deaf and Hearing Impaired Telecommunications Services Board
  - Arkansas Workforce Development Board
  - Office of Skills Development
    - Career Education and Workforce Development Board
- Rehabilitation Services
  - Alternative Financing Program Board (officially the Technology Equipment Revolving Loan Fund Committee)
  - Governor's Commission on People with Disabilities
  - Increasing Capabilities Access Network Advisory Council
  - State Rehabilitation Council
  - Telecommunications Access Advisory Council

==== Boards and commissions ====
- Arkansas Burial Association Board
- Arkansas Development Finance Authority
  - Arkansas Development Finance Authority Board
- Arkansas Economic Development Commission
  - Arkansas Economic Development Council
- Arkansas Film Commission
    - Governor's Military Affairs Committee
- Minority and Women-Owned Business Advisory Council
- Science and Technology Board
- Arkansas Rural Development Commission
- Arkansas Science and Technology Authority
- Arkansas Housing Trust Fund
- Arkansas State Banking Board
- Arkansas Waterways Commission
- Arkansas Wine Producers Council
- Economic Development of Arkansas Fund Commission

=== Department of Corrections ===
- Criminal Detention Facilities Review Coordinator
  - Criminal Detention Facility Review Committee
- Division of Correction
- Division of Community Correction
  - Arkansas State Council for the Interstate Commission for Adult Offender Supervision
- Arkansas Corrections School System

==== Boards and commissions ====
- Arkansas Board of Corrections
- Arkansas Parole Board
- Arkansas Sentencing Commission

=== Department of Education ===
- Arkansas State Board of Education
- Division of Career and Technical Education
- Division of Elementary and Secondary Education
- Division of Higher Education
- Arkansas School for the Blind and Visually Impaired
- Arkansas School for the Deaf
- Arkansas State Library
  - Arkansas State Library Board
- Northwest Technical Institute
  - Northwest Technical Institute Board of Directors

==== Boards and commissions ====
- Veterans Employment & Training Services
- Arkansas Higher Education Coordinating Board
- Arkansas Workforce Development Board
- Martin Luther King, Jr. Commission

=== Department of Energy & Environment ===
- Division of Environmental Quality
  - Office of Air Quality
  - Office of Energy
    - Arkansas Liquefied Petroleum Gas Board
    - Arkansas Oil and Gas Commission
  - Office of Land Resources
  - Office of Water Quality
- Arkansas Pollution Control and Ecology Commission

==== Boards and commissions ====
- Advisory Committee on Petroleum Storage Tanks
- Arkansas Geological Survey
- Arkansas Marketing Board for Recyclables
- Nutrient Water Quality Trading Advisory Panel
- Solid Waste Licensing Committee
- Wastewater Licensing Committee

=== Department of Finance and Administration ===
  - Division of Alcoholic Beverage Control
- Division of Assessment Coordination
- Office of Accounting
  - Reconciliation Section
  - Appropriations and Funds Section
  - Comprehensive Annual Financial Report Section
- Office of Administrative Services
- Office of Budget
- Office of Child Support Enforcement
- Office of Driver Services
  - CDL Help Desk
  - Driver Control Section
  - Driver Records Section
  - Safety Responsibility Section
- Office of Excise Tax Administration
  - Miscellaneous Tax Section
  - Motor Fuel Tax Section
  - Sales and Use Tax Section
  - Tax Credits/Special Refunds Section
- Office of Field Audit Administration
  - Electronic Games of Skill Section
- Office of Income Tax Administration
  - Corporation Income Tax Section
  - Withholding Tax Branch
- Office of the Commissioner of Revenue Operations & Administration
- Office of the Secretary
- Office of State Revenue Administration

==== Boards and commissions ====
  - Board of Finance
  - State Commission of Child Support
  - Arkansas Lottery Commission
  - Arkansas Tobacco Control Board
  - Governor's Developmental Disabilities Council
  - Arkansas Medical Marijuana Commission
  - Arkansas Racing Commission

=== Department of Health ===
- Arkansas Surgeon General
- Universal Newborn Hearing Screening Tracking and Intervention Program
- Boards and commissions
  - Arkansas Heating, Ventilation, Air Conditioning and Refrigeration Licensing Board
  - Arkansas Health Services Permit Agency
  - Arkansas Kidney Disease Commission
  - Arkansas State Board of Health
  - Arkansas Board of Hearing Instrument Dispensers
  - Arkansas Board of Examiners in Speech-Language Pathology & Audiology
  - Arkansas Social Work Licensing Board
  - Arkansas State Board of Registered Professional Sanitarians
  - Arkansas State Board of Optometry
  - Arkansas State Board of Dental Examiners
  - Arkansas Board of Dispensing Opticians
  - Arkansas Dietetics Licensing Board
  - Arkansas State Board of Chiropractic Examiners
  - Arkansas Board of Examiners in Counseling
  - Emergency Medical Services Advisory Council
  - Arkansas State Board of Cosmetology
  - Arkansas Board of Podiatric Medicine
  - Arkansas State Board of Athletic Training
  - Arkansas State Board of Physical Therapy
  - Arkansas State Board of Pharmacy
  - Arkansas Psychology Board
  - Arkansas Minority Health Commission
  - Arkansas State Board of Nursing
  - Arkansas State Medical Board
  - Health Services Commission
  - Grade A Milk Program Advisory Committee xx
  - Arkansas Spinal Cord Commission
  - State Examining Committee for Physical Therapists
  - Breast Cancer Control Advisory Board
  - Arkansas State Board of Acupuncture and Related Techniques
  - Marine Sanitation Advisory Committee
  - Medical Ionizing Radiation Licensure Committee
  - Alcoholism and Drug Abuse Counselors, Arkansas Board of Examiners
  - Prescription Drug Advisory Committee
  - Arkansas Tobacco Settlement Commission
  - Arkansas Youth Suicide Prevention Task Force
  - Arkansas Orthotics Prosthetics and Pedorthics Advisory Board
  - Prescriptive Authority Advisory Commission
  - Tobacco Prevention and Cessation Advisory Committee
  - Health Services Permit Commission
  - Cosmetology Technical Advisory Committee
  - Advisory Board of Interpreters
  - Arkansas Suicide Prevention Council
  - Massage Therapy Technical Advisory Committee

=== Department of Human Services ===
- Division of Aging, Adult, & Behavioral Health Services
- Division of Child Care & Early Childhood Education
- Division of Children & Family Services
- Division of County Operations
- Division of Developmental Disabilities Services
- Division of Medical Services
- Division of Provider Services & Quality Assurance
- Division of Youth Services

Shared Services

- Office of Chief Counsel
- Office of Communications and Community Engagement
- Office of the Secretary

==== Boards and commissions ====
- Arkansas Behavioral Health Planning and Advisory Council
- Arkansas Governor's Development Disabilities Council
- Arkansas Early Childhood Commission
- Governor's Advisory Council on Aging
- Arkansas Alcohol and Drug Abuse Coordinating Council
- Arkansas Drug Director
- Arkansas State Epidemiological Outcomes Workgroup
- Arkansas State Hospital Advisory Council

State Institutional System Board (SIS)

- Early Head Start Governance Board
- Child Care Appeal Review Panel
- Child Welfare Agency Review Board (Placement and Residential Licensing)
- Act 1434 Board (“Name Removal Board” or “Child Maltreatment Central Registry Review Team”)
- Child Death and Near Fatality Multidisciplinary Review Committee
- Citizens Review Panel
- Arkansas Community Action Agencies Association
- Autism Legislative Task Force
- Board of Developmental Disabilities Services
- Early Intervention Quality Assurance
- Governor's Employment First Task Force

Human Development Center Mortality Review Committee Interagency Council (ICC) for First Connections/State Interagency Council Parent Advisory Council Drug Cost Committee (DCC) Drug Review Committee (DRC) Drug Utilization Review Board (DUR) Patient-Centered Medical Home (PCMH) Committee Rate Appeal and Cost Settlement Committee (RACS) Retrospective Drug Utilization Review (RDUR) Board Security Advisory Committee (SAC) Strategic Advisory Group (SAG) Arkansas Lifespan Respite Coalition Arkansas Coalition for Juvenile Justice Board State Institutional System Board (SIS) Youth Justice Reform Board Commission on Children, Youth, and Families

=== Department of Inspector General ===
- Arkansas Fair Housing Commission
- Office of Internal Audit
- Medicaid Inspector General

=== Department of Labor and Licensing ===
==== Boards and commissions ====
- Arkansas Auctioneers Licensing Board
- Arkansas Board of Architects, Landscape Architects and Interior Designers
- Arkansas Board of Licensure for Professional Engineers and Professional Surveyors
- Arkansas Board of Registration for Professional Geologists
- Arkansas Contractors Licensing Board
- Arkansas Elevator Safety Board
- Arkansas Fire Protection Licensing Board
- Arkansas Professional Bail Bondsman Licensing Board
- Arkansas State Board of Appraisers, Abstracters, and Home Inspectors
- Arkansas State Board of Barber Examiners
- Arkansas State Board of Collection Agencies

=== Department of the Military ===
- Arkansas National Guard

=== Department of Parks, Heritage, and Tourism ===
- Division of Tourism
- Division of Parks
- Division of Arkansas Heritage
  - Arkansas Arts Council
- Arkansas History Commission
  - Arkansas Historic Preservation Program
  - Arkansas State Archives
  - Arkansas Natural Heritage Commission
  - Delta Cultural Center
  - Historic Arkansas Museum
  - Mosaic Templars Cultural Center
  - Old State House Museum
- Arkansas Natural and Cultural Resources Council

==== Boards and commissions ====
  - Arkansas Capitol Zoning District Commission
- Arkansas Parks, Recreation, and Travel Commission
- Keep Arkansas Beautiful Commission
- War Memorial Stadium Commission

=== Department of Public Safety ===
- Arkansas Division of Emergency Management
- Arkansas State Police
- Arkansas State Police Commission
- Arkansas State Crime Laboratory
- Arkansas Fire Prevention Commission
- Arkansas Crime Information Center
- Arkansas Crime Victims Reparations Board

==== Boards and commissions ====
- Arkansas Board of Private Investigators and Private Security Agencies
- Arkansas Commission on Law Enforcement Standards and Training

=== Department of Shared Administrative Services ===
- Division of Building Authority
- Division of Employee Benefits
  - State and Public School Life and Health Insurance Board
- Division of Information Systems
  - Arkansas State Technology Council
  - Data and Transparency Panel
  - Office of Cybersecurity
- Division of Land Surveys
- Office of GIS
  - Arkansas GIS Board
  - Land Survey Advisory Board
- Office of Personnel Management
- Office of State Procurement

=== Department of Veteran Affairs ===
- Arkansas Veteran's Commission

== Non-cabinet agencies ==
- Arkansas Board of Apportionment
- Arkansas Legislative Audit
- Arkansas State Highway Commission
  - Arkansas Department of Transportation
    - Arkansas Highway Police
- Arkansas Federal Credit Union
- Arkansas Public Employees Retirement System
- Arkansas Board of Workforce Education and Career Opportunities
- Arkansas Department of Career Education
- Arkansas Educational Television Commission
- Arkansas Game and Fish Commission

=== Advisory boards and commissions ===
- Arkansas Advisory Council for the Education of Gifted and Talented Children
- Arkansas Alternative Energy Commission
- Arkansas Capitol Arts and Grounds Commission
- Arkansas Child Abuse and Neglect Prevention Board
- Arkansas Child Abuse, Rape, Domestic Violence Commission
- Governor's Commission on National Service and Volunteerism - Engage Arkansas

=== Professional certification, licensure, and registration ===
- Arkansas Board of Health Education
- Arkansas Real Estate Commission
- Arkansas State Board of Massage Therapy
- Arkansas State Board of Private Career Education
- Arkansas State Board of Public Accountancy
- Arkansas State Board of Registration for Foresters
- Arkansas State Board of Registration for Professional Soil Classifiers
- Arkansas Alternative Dispute Resolution Commission
- Arkansas Bureau of Legislative Research
- Arkansas Cemetery Board
- Arkansas Commission on Water Well Construction
- Arkansas Ethics Commission
- Arkansas Local Police and Fire Retirement System
- Arkansas Manufactured Home Commission
- Arkansas Motor Vehicle Commission
- Arkansas Office of Health Information Technology
- Arkansas Public Defender Commission
- Arkansas Public Service Commission
- Arkansas Service Commission
- Arkansas Small Business & Technology Development Center
- Arkansas State Athletic Commission
- Arkansas State Board of Election Commissioners
- Arkansas State Claims Commission
- Arkansas State Hospital
- Arkansas Student Loan Authority
- Arkansas Teacher Retirement System
- Arkansas Temporary Assistance for Needy Families Oversight Board
- Arkansas Towing and Recovery Board
- Arkansas Veterinary Medical Examining Board
- Arkansas Workers' Compensation Commission
- Arkansas Workforce Investment Board
- Board of Electrical Examiners of the State of Arkansas
- Civil Air Patrol - Arkansas Wing
- Disability Determination for Social Security Administration
- Governor's Commission on Global Warming
- Governor’s Mansion
- Information Network of Arkansas
- Office of the Prosecutor Coordinator
