= List of killings by law enforcement officers in the United States, 2006 =

This is a list of people reported killed by non-military law enforcement officers in the United States in 2006, whether in the line of duty or not, and regardless of reason or method. The listing documents the occurrence of a death, making no implications regarding wrongdoing or justification on the part of the person killed or officer involved. Killings are arranged by date of the incident that caused death. Different death dates, if known, are noted in the description. The table below lists 77 people.

== 2006 ==
Date	Name (age) of deceased	State (city)	Description
2006-12-29	Jeremy Robinson (14 or 15)	Missouri (St. Louis)	
2006-12-27	Oscar Gallegos (33)	California (Long Beach)	
2006-12-26	Joseph Spidell(45)	California (Los Angeles)	
2006-12-26	Michael Molina (38)	New Mexico (Las Cruces)	
2006‑12‑25	Adam Caywood	Washington (Yakima)	Shot after apparently attempting to run down officer with vehicle. Police were pursuing Caywood as a prime suspect in a recent home burglary. After crashing vehicle, and as officers were approaching on foot, Caywood reversed into police cruiser.
2006-12-24	Sigmun Lee (45)	California (Bakersfield)	Shot and killed by Kern County Sheriff deputies Sean Pratt and Jason Nelson. They had been called to a report of a man vandalizing the motel room and threatening guests. They found Lee holding a hammer and ordered him to drop it. Instead he moved toward the deputies. Feeling threatened, they shot and killed him. A review board of Sheriffs Department officials determined that the shooting was within department policy.
2006-12-23	Unnamed man (30)	California (Corona)	
2006-12-23	Brandon Allen (29)	Pennsylvania (Pittsburgh)	
2006-12-19	Khalid Amir Nelson (27)	Georgia (Gwinett)	
2006-12-18	Jesse Turnbow (29)	Utah (Ogden)	
2006-12-16	Anatoly Dimitriev (62)	New York (New York)	
2006-12-15	Willie Allen Sargent, Jr	Georgia (Snellville)	Died of injuries from motor vehicle accidents. Sargent's vehicle was hit by an officer responding to a call for backup for a suspicious person. The officer was traveling approximately 80 mph without lights or siren.
2006-12-13	Edward Agurs (39)	Virginia (Fairfax County)	
2006-12-11	Unnamed man (33)	Kansas (Overland Park)	
2006-12-08	Joe Jackson (58)	Illinois (Chicago)	Jackson shot and killed three men and injured a woman at a Downtown Chicago office building. Jackson was later shot to death by SWAT officers Felipe Nunez and Charles Rhein.
2006-12-07	Jonni Kiyoshi Honda	California (Eureka)	On December 8, 2006, Honda, approached from a Super 8 motel in a prone position and reportedly aimed a handgun at police officers, causing his death. He was wanted in Trinity County for failing to appear in court as part of a case in which he was accused of molesting children. In November, Honda was pursued by the California Highway Patrol and temporarily hid in the woods. On December 7, detectives from the Eureka Police Department attempted to serve the arrest warrant on Honda after detectives from Trinity County gave a tip that he was staying at a Super 8 motel. When Honda was alerted to their presence, he locked a motel room door and a 32-hour standoff ensued.
2006-11-30	Salvatore Culosi	Virginia (Fairfax)	A SWAT team from Fairfax, Virginia showed up to Culosi's home as part of a sting operation set up by detective, David J. Baucom. While Culosi was exiting his house, SWAT officer, David Bullock, accidentally fired his MP5 as it was aimed at Culosi. The round entered through Culosi's side and exited through his heart, killing him instantly.
2006-11-29	Donald Gray (40)	Maine (South Partland)	
2006-11-26	Brandon Martell Moore (16)	Michigan (Detroit)	Moore was unarmed and "shot to death in the back by off duty police officer Eugene Williams."
2006-11-25	Sean Bell	New York	Sean Bell shooting incident. Sean Bell was shot to death, and two of his friends were wounded, after five NYPD undercover and plainclothes officers fired 50 shots on Bell's car. Three officers, Marc Cooper, Gescard Isnora, and Michael Olive, were charged with crimes ranging from manslaughter to reckless endangerment, and were all found not guilty.
2006-11-21	Kathryn Johnston	Georgia	Kathryn Johnston shooting
2006-11-18	Phillip Lloyd (33)	Illinois (Robbins)	Lloyd was shot by the same officer who shot him in 2004.
2006-11-18	Michael Smith (22)	Illinois (Chicago)	Smith was shot and killed by a plainclothes officer who said Smith allegedly tried to grab his gun at a Woodlawn convenience store. However witnesses say that Smith did not reach for a gun or engage a struggle.
2006-11-16	Willie Banks	Georgia (Moultrie)	Shot after pulling out a pocket knife. Police were serving a bench warrant. Witness claim Banks was handing a box cutter to police.
2006-11-12	Bruce Fender	Georgia (Savannah)	Died from injuries after being struck by police cruiser. Witness report that Fender walked in front of the vehicle and was not using a designated crosswalk.
2006-10-30	Marcus Thomas (21)	Illinois (Chicago)	
2006-10-30	William Tyler (23)	Illinois (Chicago)	
2006-10-29	Wayne Reyes (42)	Minnesota (Minneapolis)	Reyes had stabbed his girlfriend and a friend and then drove off. When police stopped him, Reyes allegedly swung a sawed-off shotgun toward them before they shot him multiple times. Reyes was killed by 23 gunshots from six police officers. Derek Chauvin, the man who would later go on to murder George Floyd, was involved in this shooting.
2006-10-28	Isaac Jolley	Georgia (Atlanta)	Shot by an off-duty jail detention officer. During an argument with Jolley's brother, the officer struck the brother in the head using the officer's personal weapon. The weapon discharged, fatally striking Jolley in stomach.
2006-10-13	Eugene Culp	Washington (Shoreline)	Shot while attempting to hit police officer with vehicle. Officers were responding to report of man knocking at front and back doors of a house.
2006-10-04	Ellis Parker (30)	Iowa (Sioux City)	
2006-10-03	Orrin Tack Hunnicutt	Arizona (Catalina)	Orrin Tack Hunnicutt, 30 was shot by Deputy Norman Baughman, 42, Bureau Chief Richard Kastigar said.
2008-09-30	Dominic Felder (27)	Minnesota (Minneapolis)	
2006-09-29	Angilo Freeland (27)	Florida (Polk County)	Freeland killed a Polk County sheriff's deputy and injured another in a shooting at a traffic stop on September 28. On September 29, police discovered him hiding nearby and shot him 68 times when he pointed a gun at them. Sheriff Grady Judd said that "that’s all the bullets we had, or we would have shot him more."
2006-09-27	Eric Cage (32)	Illinois (Chicago)	Cage was killed when he was hit by an unmarked squad car driving the wrong way of the street he was on.
2006-09-17	James Chasse	Oregon	James Chasse
2006-09-15	Jose Castaneda, a.k.a. Alex Rivera a.k.a. Carlos Rivera (18)	Utah (Salt lake City)	
2006-08-25	Duncan, Richard "Cali" (26)	Maine (Portland)	
2006-08-24	unnamed man	Georgia (Decatur)	Shot after lunging at police officer and attempting to grab officer's service revolver. Police were responding to report of trespassing in vacant apartment.
2006-08-23	Christopher Lee Conte	Georgia (Decatur)	Died after being pepper sprayed and hit with batons.
2006-08-04	Ryan Wilson	Colorado (Lafayette)	Died of an irregular heartbeat after being shocked by a Taser. Police were investigating a report of marijuana plants growing in the area.
2006-08-03	Joaquin Figueroa (25)	California (Fresno)	Fresno Police officers suspected Figueroa was responsible for shooting and wounding one of their officers. When police confronted him and he did not show his hands as ordered, Police shot and killed him. He was unarmed.
2006-07-22	Fong Lee (19)	Minneapolis, Minnesota	Shooting of Fong Lee. Lee was chased and shot dead by police who "claimed that they were following Lee and his friends because he suspected they were dealing drugs, though no drugs were found on Fong Lee's body".
2006-07-16	Qamont Parr (22)	Illinois (Chicago)	
2006-07-15	Alan Griffin	Georgia (Atlanta)	Shot by an off-duty deputy. Griffin was the pimp for a prostitute that the deputy had attacked. The deputy shot Griffin when Griffin confronted him with a handgun. The deputy was found guilty of manslaughter and was sentenced to 15 years in prison.
2006-07-13	Gregory Keith Hensley	North Carolina (Buncombe County)	
2006-07-13	Terry Jackson Evans	North Carolina (Buncombe County)	
2006-07-06	Lacy Pickens III	North Carolina (Asheville)	
2006-06-24	Joseph Fortunati (40)	Vermont (Corinth)	
2006-06-14	Malcolm Lofton (29)	Illinois (Chicago)	
2006-06-07	Juan Hernandez (45)	Illinois (Chicago)	
2006-06-07	Santos Cabrera	Georgia (Atlanta)	Shot after swinging a piece of metal at an officer. Police were responding to a report of a fatal ax attack on a child. When officers approached a man acting suspiciously, he threw a tire at one officer, breaking his arm.
2006-06-03	James King (47)	Illinois (Chicago)	
2006-05-30	Otto Zehm	Washington (Spokane)	Otto Zehm
2006-05-27	William Maw (35)	Utah (Ogden)	
2006-05-16	Jovan Walker (24)	Illinois (Chicago)	Walker was shot and killed when he allegedly pointed gun at the officer. But witnesses say he had his hands up when he was shot by the officer.
2006-05-03	Michael Dunbar (30)	Illinois (Chicago)	
2006-04-30	Dantwan Betts (21)	Illinois (Chicago)	Betts was shot to death after he allegedly backed his car into the officer's car.
2006-04-14	Christopher Burgess	California (Eureka)	Officers from the Humboldt County Probation Department attempted to serve a warrant on Burgess for a probation violation. He then pulled out a 10-inch hunting knife. The probation officers maced him, but Burgess forced them out of the house. He then retreated through the yards of various neighbours and went into a gully. Eureka Police Department officer, Terry Liles, located Burgess and yelled at him to give up. Moments later, Burgess was shot two times by Liles after he allegedly threatened him with a knife.
2006-04-14	Cheri Lynn Moore	California (Eureka)	Moore, who was suicidal, was shot by SWAT after pointing a flare gun. The police chief and a lieutenant, who did not shoot Moore but ordered the SWAT raid, were indicted by a grand jury for involuntary manslaughter, but the case was dismissed by a judge.
2006-04-12	Brian Keller (30)	Illinois (Chicago)	
2006-04-07	Kenneth Elrod (31)	Illinois (Chicago)	
2006-04-07	Demetri Centera (31)	Illinois (Chicago)	
2006-04-06	Paris Nicholson (21)	Illinois (Summit)	
2006-03-25	Sherett James (22)	U.S. Virgin Islands (Charlotte Amalie)	An off-duty detective murdered his girlfriend and wounded another man. He was convicted of six out of eight charges and was sentenced to life in prison without parole plus 40 years, which he is serving at Citrus County Detention Facility in Lecanto, Florida.
2006-03-07	Joseph Erin Hamley (21)	Arkansas (Tontitown)	Fatal police shooting of Joseph Erin Hamley
2006-02-28	Tony Francis (42)	Duchesne County, Utah	
2006-02-28	Eric James Andrews (18)	California, Temecula	Deputies from the Riverside County Sheriff's Department were responding to a 911 call about a suicidal man in an apartment complex. When they arrived at the apartment, they ordered all occupants to evacuate. An 18-year-old woman first came out with a knife and was temporarily detained by the deputies. She told them that Andrews was inside her apartment building. When they came into the apartment, they ordered anyone inside to show themselves to the deputies. After no response, they went upstairs and saw Andrews holding a knife. Andrews was ordered to drop the knife, but he charged at the deputies, resulting in his death.
2006-02-28	Walter Richardson, Jr. (36)	Pennsylvania (Philadelphia)	Killed in a shootout with police and federal agents. Richardson had shot a police officer in New Hartford, New York the previous day during a jewelry store robbery.
2006-02-25	Aaron Brown	Virginia (Alexandria)	Killed by police officer shooting into the vehicle in which Brown was traveling with other teens who had left a restaurant without paying the bill.
2006-02-15	Nan Guang Xi (32)	Northern Mariana Islands (San Antonio)	After stabbing and killing three people at a bookstore, Xi attacked an officer and was shot and killed.
2006-02-13	Everett Angle (58)	California (Atwater)	A SWAT officer from the Merced County Sheriff's Department shot and killed Everett Angle after a two-hour standoff. Angle walked out of his house and fired a shot from a .22 caliber rifle. Angle had been facing health problems and was depressed according to his daughter-in-law.
2006-02-04	Jessie Lee Williams Jr.	Mississippi (Gulfport)	Williams was beaten while being arrested for a misdemeanor charge at the Harrison County jail. He was kicked, tased, covered with a mask filled with pepper spray while being tied to a restraint chair, and he finally died on the chair when he was hit.
2006-01-29	Benites Sichiro (39)	Washington (Spokane)	Sichiro was arrested on January 27 for felony counts of criminal trespass, obstruction of justice and fourth-degree assault. Two days later, when a nurse requested he be moved to another cell due to symptoms of alcohol withdrawal, Sichiro fought three times with police officers who attempted to move him. Deputies used a Taser and punched Sichiro, who stopped breathing and was later pronounced dead in the hospital.
2006-01-20	Clarence Walker	Georgia (Marshallville)	Died of a sudden cardiac arrhythmia while being arrested and after being subdued with pepper spray. Officers were arresting Walker for probation and parole violations.
2006-01-17	Cleon Jones (32)	Illinois (Chicago)	
2006-01-06	Martin Anderson	Florida	Martin Anderson death controversy

== See also ==
- Death in custody § United States
- Henry A. Wallace Police Crime Public Database
- List of cases of police brutality
- List of countries with annual rates and counts for killings by law enforcement officers
- List of law enforcement officers killed in the line of duty in the United States
- List of law enforcement officers convicted for an on-duty killing in the United States
- List of shootings by US immigration agents
- List of police reforms related to the George Floyd protests
- List of unarmed African Americans killed by law enforcement officers in the United States
- Lists of killings by law enforcement officers
- Police brutality in the United States
- Police misconduct § United States
- Police riot § United States
- Police use of deadly force in the United States
