= List of law enforcement agencies in Arkansas =

Flag of Arkansas.svg

This is a list of law enforcement agencies in the state of Arkansas.

According to the US Bureau of Justice Statistics' 2008 Census of State and Local Law Enforcement Agencies, the state had 237 law enforcement agencies employing 6,779 sworn police officers, about 236 for each 100,000 residents.

Further, Arkansas Code § 16-81-106(g)(1) empowers specific federal law enforcement officers (e.g., FBI, Homeland Security, DEA, Marshals, etc.) to act as officers for the arrest of individuals violating Arkansas state laws. These agents receive the same authority and immunity as certified state law enforcement officers under state law.

Law Enforcement in the State of Arkansas may have different emergency lighting depending on the preference of the agency. Arkansas law enforcement may choose to have police vehicles equipped with red and blue combination emergency lights or may use primarily blue emergency lights in their vehicles. Arkansas state law requires Arkansas law enforcement to at minimum have a blue flashing or rotating light equipped on police vehicles including city, county, state, or federal law enforcement. Only law enforcement in Arkansas are allowed to have vehicles equipped with a blue light.

== State agencies ==
- Arkansas Department of Public Safety
  - Arkansas Commission on Law Enforcement and Standard Training
  - Arkansas Division of Emergency Management
  - Arkansas Crime Information Center
  - Arkansas State Crime Lab
  - Crime Victim Reparations Board
  - Fire Services
  - Fire Prevention Commission
- Arkansas State Alcoholic Beverage Control
- Arkansas Department of Corrections (ADOC)
  - Arkansas Division of Corrections (ADC)
  - Arkansas Division of Community Corrections (DCC)
  - Arkansas Correctional School District (ACS)
- Arkansas Forestry Commission
- Arkansas Game and Fish Commission
- Arkansas Department of Transportation
  - Arkansas Highway Police
- Arkansas Law Enforcement Training Academy
- Arkansas State Capitol Police
- Arkansas State Hospital Police
- Arkansas Department of Parks, Heritage, and Tourism
  - Arkansas State Park Rangers
- Arkansas State Police
- Arkansas Supreme Court Police
- Arkansas Tobacco Control Board Enforcement
- Arkansas Department of Insurance

== County agencies ==
- Arkansas County Sheriff's Office
- Ashley County Sheriff's Office
- Baxter County Sheriff's Office
- Benton County Sheriff's Office
- Boone County Sheriff's Office
- Bradley County Sheriff's Office
- Calhoun County Sheriff's Office
- Carroll County Sheriff's Office
- Chicot County Sheriff's Office
- Clark County Sheriff's Office
- Clay County Sheriff's Office
- Cleburne County Sheriff's Office
- Cleveland County Sheriff's Office
- Columbia County Sheriff's Office
- Conway County Sheriff's Office
- Craighead County Sheriff's Office
- Crawford County Sheriff's Office
- Crittenden County Sheriff's Office
- Cross County Sheriff's Office
- Dallas County Sheriff's Office
- Desha County Sheriff's Office
- Drew County Sheriff's Office
- Faulkner County Sheriff's Office
- Franklin County Sheriff's Office
- Fulton County Sheriff's Office
- Garland County Sheriff's Office
- Grant County Sheriff's Office
- Greene County Sheriff's Office
- Hempstead County Sheriff's Office
- Hot Spring County Sheriff's Office
- Howard County Sheriff's Office
- Independence County Sheriff's Office
- Izard County Sheriff's Office
- Jackson County Sheriff's Office
- Jefferson County Sheriff's Office
- Johnson County Sheriff's Office
- Lafayette County Sheriff's Office
- Lawrence County Sheriff's Office
- Lee County Sheriff's Office
- Lincoln County Sheriff's Office
- Little River County Sheriff's Office
- Logan County Sheriff's Office
- Lonoke County Sheriff's Office
- Madison County Sheriff's Office
- Marion County Sheriff's Office
- Miller County Sheriff's Office
- Mississippi County Sheriff's Office
- Monroe County Sheriff's Office
- Montgomery County Sheriff's Office
- Nevada County Sheriff's Office
- Newton County Sheriff's Office
- Ouachita County Sheriff's Office
- Perry County Sheriff's Office
- Phillips County Sheriff's Office
- Pike County Sheriff's Office
- Poinsett County Sheriff's Office
- Polk County Sheriff's Office
- Pope County Sheriff's Office
- Prairie County Sheriff's Office
- Pulaski County Sheriff's Office
- Randolph County Sheriff's Office
- Saint Francis County Sheriff's Office
- Saline County Sheriff's Office
- Scott County Sheriff's Office
- Searcy County Sheriff's Office
- Sebastian County Sheriff's Office
- Sevier County Sheriff's Office
- Sharp County Sheriff's Office
- Stone County Sheriff's Office
- Union County Sheriff's Office
- Van Buren County Sheriff's Office
- Washington County Sheriff's Office
- White County Sheriff's Office
- Woodruff County Sheriff's Office
- Yell County Sheriff's Office

== City agencies ==
- Alexander Police Department
- Alma Police Department
- Almyra Police Department
- Alpena Police Department
- Altheimer Police Department
- Altus Police Department
- Amity Police Department
- Arkadelphia Police Department
- Arkansas City Police Department
- Ash Flat Police Department
- Ashdown Police Department
- Atkins Police Department
- Augusta Police Department
- Austin Police Department
- Bald Knob Police Department
- Barling Police Department
- Batesville Police Department
- Bauxite Police Department
- Bay Police Department
- Bearden Police Department
- Beebe Police Department
- Bella Vista Police Department
- Benton Police Department
- Bentonville Police Department
- Bergman Police Department
- Berryville Police Department
- Black Rock Police Department
- Blevins Marshal's Office
- Blytheville Police Department
- Bonanza Police Department
- Bono Police Department
- Booneville Police Department
- Bradford Police Department
- Bradley Police Department
- Brookland Police Department
- Brinkley Police Department
- Bryant Police Department
- Bull Shoals Police Department
- Cabot Police Department
- Caddo Valley Police Department
- Calion Police Department
- Camden Police Department
- Cammack Village Police Department
- Caraway Police Department
- Carlisle Police Department
- Cash Police Department
- Cave City Police Department
- Cave Springs Police Department
- Cedarville Police Department
- Centerton Police Department
- Charleston Police Department
- Cherokee Village Police Department
- Cherry Valley Police Department
- Chidester Police Department
- Clarendon Police Department
- Clarksville Police Department
- Clinton Police Department
- Coal Hill Police Department
- Concord Police Department
- Conway Police Department
- Corning Police Department
- Cotter Police Department
- Cotton Plant Police Department
- Crossett Police Department
- Damascus Police Department
- Danville Police Department
- Dardanelle Police Department
- De Queen Police Department
- De Valls Bluff Police Department
- Decatur Police Department
- Dell Police Department
- Dermott Police Department
- Des Arc Police Department
- DeWitt Police Department
- Diamond City Police Department
- Diaz Police Department
- Dierks Police Department
- Donaldson Marshal's Office
- Dover Marshal's Office
- Dumas Police Department
- Dyer Police Department
- Earle Police Department
- East Camden Police Department
- El Dorado Police Department
- Elaine Police Department
- Elkins Police Department
- Elm Springs Police Department
- England Police Department
- Etowah Police Department
- Eudora Police Department
- Eureka Springs Police Department
- Evening Shade Police Department
- Fairfield Bay Police Department
- Farmington Police Department
- Fayetteville Police Department
- Flippin Police Department
- Fordyce Police Department
- Forrest City Police Department
- Fort Smith Police Department
- Fouke Police Department
- Gassville Police Department
- Gentry Police Department
- Gillett Police Department
- Gilmore Police Department
- Glenwood Police Department
- Goshen Police Department
- Gosnell Police Department
- Gould Police Department
- Grady Police Department
- Grannis Police Department
- Gravette Police Department
- Green Forest Police Department
- Greenbrier Police Department
- Greenland Police Department
- Greenwood Police Department
- Greers Ferry Police Department
- Gurdon Police Department
- Guy Police Department
- Hackett Police Department
- Hamburg Police Department
- Hampton Police Department
- Hardy Police Department
- Harrisburg Police Department
- Harrison Police Department
- Hartford Police Department
- Haskell Police Department
- Hazen Police Department
- Heber Springs Police Department
- Helena-West Helena Police Department
- Hermitage Police Department
- Hickory Ridge Police Department
- Higginson Police Department
- Highfill Police Department
- Highland Police Department
- Holly Grove Police Department
- Hope Police Department
- Horatio Police Department
- Hot Springs Police Department
- Hoxie Police Department
- Hughes Police Department
- Humphrey Police Department
- Huntington Police Department
- Huntsville Police Department
- Huttig Police Department
- Jacksonville Police Department
- Jasper Police Department
- Johnson Police Department
- Jonesboro Police Department
- Judsonia Police Department
- Junction City Police Department
- Keiser Police Department
- Kensett Police Department
- Kibler Police Department
- Lake City Police Department
- Lake View Police Department
- Lake Village Police Department
- Lakeview Police Department
- Lamar Police Department
- Lavaca Police Department
- Leachville Police Department
- Lepanto Police Department
- Lead Hill Police Department
- Lewisville Police Department
- Lexa Police Department
- Lincoln Police Department
- Little Flock Police Department
- Little Rock Police Department
- London Police Department
- Lonoke Police Department
- Lowell Police Department
- Luxora Police Department
- Madison Police Department
- Magazine Police Department
- Magnolia Police Department
- Malvern Police Department
- Mammoth Spring Police Department
- Manila Police Department
- Mansfield Police Department
- Marianna Police Department
- Marion Police Department
- Marked Tree Police Department
- Marmaduke Police Department
- Marshall Police Department
- Marvell Police Department
- Maumelle Police Department
- Mayflower Police Department
- Maynard Police Department
- McCrory Police Department
- McGehee Police Department
- McRae Police Department
- Mena Police Department
- Menifee Police Department
- Mineral Springs Police Department
- Monette Police Department
- Monticello Police Department
- Morrilton Police Department
- Mountain Home Police Department
- Mountain Pine Police Department
- Mountain View Police Department
- Mountainburg Police Department
- Mulberry Police Department
- Murfreesboro Police Department
- Nashville Police Department
- Newport Police Department
- Norfork Police Department
- Norphlet Police Department
- North Little Rock Police Department
- Ola Police Department
- Omaha Police Department
- Oppelo Police Department
- Osceola Police Department
- Ozark Police Department
- Palestine Police Department
- Pangburn Police Department
- Paragould Police Department
- Paris Police Department
- Parkin Police Department
- Patterson Police Department
- Pea Ridge Police Department
- Perry Police Department
- Perryville Police Department
- Piggott Police Department
- Pine Bluff Police Department
- Pleasant Plains Police Department
- Plumerville Police Department
- Pocahontas Police Department
- Portland Police Department
- Pottsville Police Department
- Prairie Grove Police Department
- Prescott Police Department
- Quitman Police Department
- Ravenden Police Department
- Ravenden Springs Marshal's Office
- Rector Police Department
- Redfield Police Department
- Reed Police Department
- Rison Police Department
- Rockport Police Department
- Rogers Police Department
- Rose Bud Police Department
- Russellville Police Department
- Salem Police Department
- Searcy Police Department
- Shannon Hills Police Department
- Sheridan Police Department
- Sherwood Police Department
- Siloam Springs Police Department
- Smackover Police Department
- Sparkman Police Department
- Springdale Police Department
- St. Charles Police Department
- Stamps Police Department
- Star City Police Department
- Stephens Police Department
- Stuttgart Police Department
- Sulphur Springs Police Department
- Sunset Police Department
- Swifton Police Department
- Taylor Police Department
- Texarkana Police Department
- Tontitown Police Department
- Traskwood Police Department
- Trumann Police Department
- Tuckerman Police Department
- Tull Marshal's Office
- Turrell Police Department
- Tyronza Police Department
- Van Buren Police Department
- Vilonia Police Department
- Waldenburg Police Department
- Waldo Police Department
- Waldron Police Department
- Walnut Ridge Police Department
- Ward Police Department
- Warren Police Department
- Weiner Police Department
- West Fork Police Department
- West Memphis Police Department
- Wheatley Marshal's Office
- White Hall Police Department
- Wilmot Police Department
- Wilson Police Department
- Winchester Marshal's Office
- Wynne Police Department

== College and university agencies ==
- Arkansas State University Police
- Arkansas Tech University Department of Public Safety
- Black River Technical College Police
- Henderson State University Police
- Northwest Arkansas Community College Police
- North Arkansas College Police
- Southern Arkansas University Police Department
- University of Arkansas at Fayetteville Police Department
- University of Arkansas at Little Rock Police Department
- University of Arkansas for Medical Sciences Police Department
- University of Arkansas at Fort Smith Police Department
- University of Arkansas at Morrilton Police Department
- University of Arkansas at Monticello Department of Public Safety
- University of Arkansas at Pine Bluff Police Department
- University of Central Arkansas Police Department

== Other agencies ==
- Camp Robinson Department of Public Safety
- Fort Chaffee Department of Public Safety
- Hot Springs Village Police Department
- Office of the United States Marshal for the Eastern District of Arkansas
- Office of the United States Marshal for the Western District of Arkansas
- 188th Air National Guard Police
- Union Pacific Police Department
- Kansas City Southern Railway Safety and Security Team now the Canadian Pacific Kansas City Police Service after its merger in April 14, 2023
- United States Department of Veterans Affairs Police
- U.S. Department of Homeland Security Investigations

== Defunct Agencies ==
- Alicia Police Department
- Allport Police Department
- Amagon Police Department
- Birdsong Police Department
- Belleville City Marshal's Office
- Bethel Heights Police Department
- Biggers Police Department
- Caldwell Marshal's Office
- Chester Police Department
- College City Marshal's Office
- Edmondson Police Department
- Egypt Police Department
- Fisher Police Department
- Foreman Marshal's Office
- Gateway Police Department
- Greenway Marshal's Office
- Grubbs Police Department
- Hampton Police Department
- Haynes Police Department
- Houston Police Department
- Jacksonport Police Department
- Jennette Police Department
- Joiner Police Department
- Kingsland Marshal's Office
- Magazine Police Department (Now Contracted with Logan County Sheriff's Office)
- Montrose Police Department
- Mt. Ida Police Department
- Mt. Vernon Police Department
- Newark Police Department
- O'kean Marshal's Office
- Plainview Police Department
- Portia Police Department
- Reyno Police Department
- Rudy Police Department
- Sedgwick Police Department
- Strong Police Department
- Sulphur Rock Marshal's Office
- Summit Police Department
- West Point Police Department
- Widener Police Department
- Wilton Police Department
- Winchester Marshal's Office
- Yellville Police Department
