= Arkansas Department of Health =

Government agency

- Great Seal of Arkansas

- Department of Health logo

Agency overview
- Formed: February 25, 1913; Reorganized 1971
- Jurisdiction: State of Arkansas
- Headquarters: 4815 West Markham Street Little Rock, Arkansas 72205
- Annual budget: ▲$506,221,156
- Agency executives: Renee Mallory, Interim Secretary of Health; Joe Bates, Deputy State Health Officer and Chief Science Officer; Stephanie C. Williams, Deputy Director for Public Health Programs
- Parent agency: Arkansas State Board of Health
- Child agency: State government units for each county
- Key document: Public Health Law
- Website: healthy.arkansas.gov

The Arkansas Department of Health (ADH or commonly Health Department within the state) is a department of the government of Arkansas under the Governor of Arkansas. It is responsible for protecting health and well-being for all Arkansans. ADH is a unified health department, with a central office coordinating among 94 local health units.

The ADH is a cabinet level agency in the executive branch of government responsible for implementation of the rules and regulations promulgated by the Arkansas State Board of Health. The Board of Health nominates the Director of ADH. Each county has a County Health Officer, appointed by the county judge and approved by the Board.

== Boards and Commissions ==
In Arkansas's shared services model of state government, the cabinet-level agencies assist boards and commissions who have an overlapping scope. ADH supports:

Boards

- Acupuncture Related Techniques, Arkansas State Board
- Arkansas State Medical Board
- Athletic Training, Arkansas State Board
- Breast Cancer Control Advisory Board
- Chiropractic Examiners, Arkansas State Board
- Dental Examiners, Arkansas State Board
- Dietetics Licensing, Arkansas Board
- Dispensing Opticians, Arkansas State Board
- Examiners of Alcoholism and Drug Abuse Counselors. Arkansas State Board
- Examiners in Counseling, Arkansas State Board
- Examiners in Speech-Language Pathology and Audiology, Arkansas Board
- Health, Arkansas State Board of
- Health Education, Arkansas Board of
- Hearing Instrument Dispensers, Arkansas State Board
- Interpreters for the Deaf, Advisory Board
- Nursing, Arkansas Board
- OPP Advisory Board
- Optometry, Arkansas State Board
- Pharmacy, Arkansas State Board
- Physical Therapy, Arkansas State Board
- Podiatric Medicine Board
- Psychology, Arkansas Board
- Registered Sanitarians, Arkansas State Board
- Social Work Licensing Board

Commissions

- Arkansas Health Services Permit Agency
- Arkansas Kidney Disease Commission
- Arkansas Minority Health Commission
- Arkansas Spinal Cord Commission
- Arkansas Tobacco Settlement Commission
- Athletic Commission, Arkansas State
- OHIT - SHARE

Councils

- Arkansas Diabetes Advisory Council
- Chronic Disease Coordinating Council
- STEMI Advisory Council (STAC)

Committees

- Arkansas Acute Stroke Care Task Force (ASCTF)
- Arkansas Cancer Coalition
- Arkansas Clinical Transformation (ACT) Collaborative
- Arkansas Coalition for Obesity Prevention (ARCOP)
- Arkansas Maternal Mortality Review Committee
- Arkansas Oral Health Coalition
- Arkansas Wellness Coalition
- Cervical Cancer Task Force
- Child Health Advisory Committee
- Cosmetology Technical Advisory Committee
- Drinking-Water Advisory and Water Operator Licensing Committee
- Full Independent Practice Credentialing Committee
- Healthcare - Associated Infections Advisory Committee
- Massage Therapy Technical Advisory Committee
- Medical Ionizing Radiation Licensure Committee (MIRLC)
- Plumbing Examiner's Committee

== See also ==
- Arkansas Department of Environmental Quality

== See also ==
- Staff of the Arkansas Department of Health, ed. (2013). "100 Years of Service, Arkansas Department of Health 1923-2013" (PDF). Little Rock: Arkansas Department of Health. Archived from the original (PDF) on October 16, 2020.
- Scholle, Sarah Hudson (1990). The Pain in Prevention. Little Rock: Arkansas Department of Health.
