= Arkansas State Police =

State police agency in Arkansas, U.S.

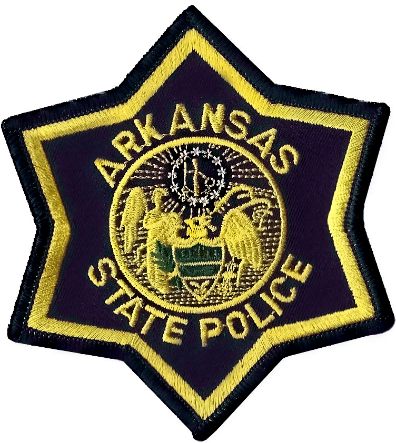
- Patch

- Logo

- Badge
- Common name: Arkansas State Police
- Abbreviation: ASP

Agency overview
- Formed: March 19, 1935; 91 years ago
- Employees: 949 (as of July 2024)
- Legal personality: Governmental: Government agency

Jurisdictional structure
- Operations jurisdiction: Arkansas, USA
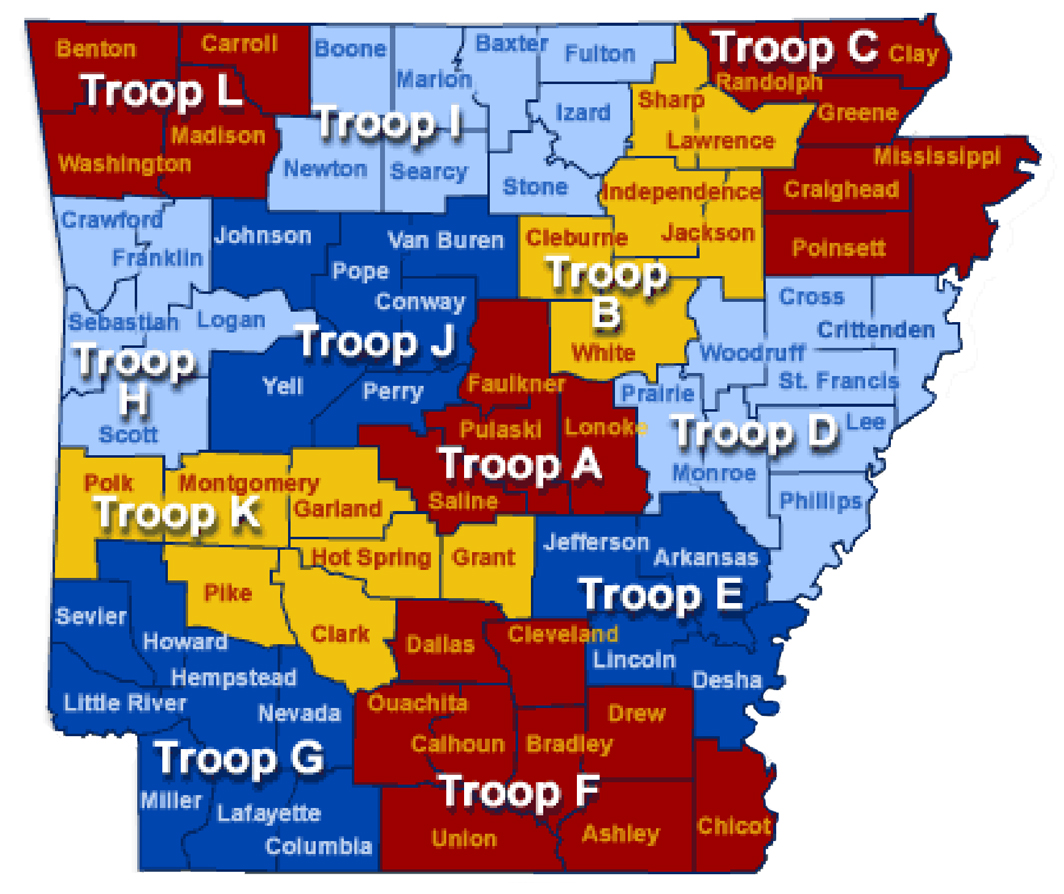
- Map of Arkansas State Police's jurisdiction
- Area: 53,179 square miles (137,730 km^{2})
- Population: 2,834,797 (2007 est.)
- Legal jurisdiction: Arkansas
- Governing body: Government of Arkansas
- General nature: Local civilian police

Operational structure
- Headquarters: Little Rock, Arkansas
- State Troopers: 586 (authorized, as of 2022)
- Civilians: 384 (as of Oct 2023)
- Agency executives: Mike Hagar, DPS Secretary; Colonel Mike Hagar, Director
- Parent agency: Arkansas Department of Public Safety

Facilities
- Troops: 12

Notables
- People: Wayne Hays (fictional); Tommy F. Robinson; Dwight Tosh

Website
- Arkansas State Police

The Arkansas State Police is a state police division of the Arkansas Department of Public Safety and is responsible for enforcing motor vehicle laws, traffic laws, and criminal laws. The Arkansas State Police serves as an assisting agency to local law enforcement agencies within the State of Arkansas and has statewide authority to conduct law enforcement activities, criminal investigations, and crimes against children investigations.

== History ==
The Arkansas State Police was created on 19 March 1935 through Act 120 of 1935, which was passed by the Arkansas General Assembly and signed into law by the 30th Governor of Arkansas J.M. Futrell. Upon the creation of the Arkansas State Police in 1935, the agency consisted of approximately thirteen Rangers who were charged with enforcing liquor laws and traffic laws. From its creation in 1935, the Arkansas State Police has been an assisting agency to local law enforcement agencies.

== State Police Commission ==
The Arkansas State Police Commission is made up of seven members, appointed by the Governor of Arkansas with the advice and consent of the Arkansas Senate for seven year terms. The commission is responsible for the overall control of the Arkansas State Police.

Current Commissioners:

- Chairman: Jim Hinkle of Conway, Arkansas
- Vice-chair: Ken Reeves of Harrison, Arkansas
- Secretary: Neff Basore of Bella Vista, Arkansas
- Member: Mike Akin of Monticello, Arkansas
- Member: Steve Edwards of Marianna, Arkansas
- Member: Jeffery Teague of Fayetteville, Arkansas
- Member: John Allison of Conway, Arkansas

== Organization ==
- Arkansas Governor - Sarah Huckabee Sanders
  - Arkansas Department of Public Safety Secretary - Mike Hagar
    - Arkansas State Police Director - Colonel Mike Hagar
      - Deputy Director - Lieutenant Colonel Mike Kennedy - Administrative Services
      - Deputy Director - Lieutenant Colonel Jason Aaron - Field Operations
- Administrative Services - Major Roby Rhoads
  - The Administrative Services consists of two of the Division's largest sections, recruiting and training, in addition, Human Resources services for the more than 900 State Police employees. The Arkansas State Police Recruiting Office collects the initial contact forms of all potential recruits and prepares the next generation of State Police Recruits who may enter the department's Training Academy. The training officers assigned to the division develop and teach both curriculum for new recruits as well as in-service training for incumbent Troopers.
    - Arkansas State Police Personnel
      - Employment
      - Office of Personnel Management
      - Equal Employment Opportunity Policy

=== Highway Patrol ===
The Highway Patrol Division is the uniformed division of the Arkansas State Police. It is headquartered at One State Police Plaza Drive, Little Rock, Arkansas.

Arkansas State Police - Highway Patrol
Troop	Station	Counties Covered
Troop A	Little Rock, Arkansas	Faulkner, Lonoke, Pulaski and Saline
Troop B	Newport, Arkansas	Cleburne, Independence, Jackson, Lawrence, Sharp, and White
Troop C	Jonesboro, Arkansas	Clay, Craighead, Greene, Mississippi, Poinsett, and Randolph
Troop D	Forrest City, Arkansas	Crittenden, Cross, Lee, Monroe, Phillips, Prairie, St. Francis, and Woodruff
Troop E	Pine Bluff, Arkansas	Arkansas, Desha, Jefferson, and Lincoln
Troop F	Warren, Arkansas	Ashley, Bradley, Calhoun, Chicot, Cleveland, Dallas, Drew, Ouachita, and Union
Troop G	Hope, Arkansas	Columbia, Hempstead, Howard, Lafayette, Little River, Miller, Nevada, and Sevier
Troop H	Fort Smith, Arkansas	Crawford, Franklin, Logan, Scott, and Sebastian
Troop I	Harrison, Arkansas	Baxter, Boone, Fulton, Izard, Marion, Newton, Searcy, and Stone
Troop J	Clarksville, Arkansas	Conway, Johnson, Perry, Pope, Van Buren, and Yell
Troop K	Hot Springs, Arkansas	Clark, Garland, Grant, Hot Spring, Montgomery, Pike, and Polk
Troop L	Lowell, Arkansas	Benton, Carroll, Madison, and Washington

=== Criminal Investigations ===
- Criminal Investigations - Major Stacie Rhoads - Commander
  - Special Agents assigned to Criminal Investigations, investigate criminal cases initiated by both the Arkansas State Police and local law enforcement agencies.

Arkansas State Police - Criminal Investigations
Company	Station	Counties Covered
Company A	Little Rock, Arkansas	Crittenden, Cross, Faulkner, Lee, Lonoke, Monroe, Phillips, Prairie, Pulaski, Saline, St. Francis, and Woodruff
Company B	Pine Bluff, Arkansas	Arkansas, Ashely, Bradley, Calhoun, Chicot, Cleveland, Dallas, Desha, Drew, Jefferson, and Lincoln
Company C	Hope, Arkansas	Clark, Columbia, Garland, Grant, Hempstead, Hot Spring, Howard, Lafayette, Little River, Miller, Montgomery, Nevada, Pike, Polk, and Sevier
Company D	Fort Smith, Arkansas	Benton, Carroll, Crawford, Franklin, Logan, Madison, Scott, Sebastian, and Washington
Company E	Harrison, Arkansas	Baxter, Boone, Conway, Fulton, Izard, Johnson, Marion, Newton, Perry, Pope, Searcy, Stone, Van Buren, and Yell
Company F	Jonesboro, Arkansas	Clay, Cleburne, |Craighead, Greene, Independence, Jackson, Lawrence, Mississippi, Poinsett, Randolph, Sharp, and White

=== Crimes Against Children ===
- Crimes Against Children - Major Jeffrey Drew - Commander
  - Crimes Against Children - Kalika Rogers - Investigations Administrator
  - Crimes Against Children - Dan Mack - Hotline Administrator
  - Investigators assigned to the Crimes Against Children, investigate child maltreatment and criminal cases involving juveniles along with local law enforcement agencies.

Arkansas State Police - Crimes Against Children
Area	Station	Counties Covered
Area I	Lowell, Arkansas	Benton, Boone, and Carroll
Area II	Springdale, Arkansas	Washington, Madison, and Newton
Area III	Mountain View, Arkansas	Baxter, Cleburne, Fulton, Independence, Izard, Jackson, Lawrence, Marion, Randolph, Searcy, Sharp, and Stone
Area IV	Paragould, Arkansas	Clay, Craighead, Crittenden, Cross, Greene, Mississippi, and Poinsett
Area V	Fort Smith, Arkansas	Crawford, Franklin, Johnson, Logan, Pope, Sebastian, and Yell
Area VI	Clinton, Arkansas	Conway, Faulkner, Garland, Perry, Saline, and Van Buren
Area VII	Searcy, Arkansas	Lee, Lonoke, Monroe, Phillips, Prairie, St. Francis, White, and Woodruff
Area VIII	Little Rock, Arkansas	Pulaski County
Area IX	DeQueen, Arkansas	Clark, Columbia, Grant, Hempstead, Hot Spring, Howard, Lafayette, Little River, Miller, Montgomery, Nevada, Pike, Polk, Scott, and Sevier
Area X	Stuttgart, Arkansas	Arkansas, Ashley, Bradley, Calhoun, Chicot, Cleveland, Dallas, Desha, Drew, Grant, Jefferson, Lincoln, Ouachita, and Union

== Rank structure ==
Title	Insignia	Description
Director (Rank Of Colonel)		The Director of the Arkansas State Police holds the Rank of Colonel. The Director is appointed by the Governor of Arkansas to be the professional head of the Department.
Deputy Director (Rank Of Lieutenant Colonel)		The Deputy Director holds the Rank of Lieutenant Colonel. The Deputy Director is second-in-command of department. The Deputy Director is the second highest ranked commissioned officer in the department.
Major		Majors are responsible for serving as a Highway Patrol Regional Commander, as the Criminal Investigations Commander, as the Crimes Against Children Commander, or as the Administrative Services Division Commander of the Highway Patrol.
Captain		Captains are responsible for serving as a Highway Patrol Troop Commander, Criminal Investigation Division Regional Commander or has any other upper-level administrative and managerial staff position in the agency.
Lieutenant		Lieutenants are responsible for serving as a Highway Patrol Troop Assistant Commander, Criminal Investigation Division Company Commander or supervising units and personnel or they have a specialized function within the State Police.
Sergeant		Sergeants hold First supervisory rank. They are responsible for overseeing and supervising Troopers and non-commissioned personnel in the performance of their duties.
Corporal		This Rank is attained by Trooper First Class after completion of 7 years of service. Corporals might supervise Troopers in the performance of their duties in absence of a sergeant.
Trooper First Class		This Rank is attained by Troopers after completion of 4 1/2 years of service.
Trooper		This Rank is attained by Recruits upon successful completion of the training academy, responsible for field law enforcement patrol or specialized or technical law enforcement function.
Cadet		A Cadet is a new recruit, and is the rank held by all personnel while assigned as a student at the training academy. These personnel do not wear rank insignia.

== Incidents ==
- In 1992, state troopers executed a search warrant without knocking and announcing themselves. The U.S. Supreme Court ruled the action violated the Fourth Amendment in Wilson v. Arkansas.
- In 1993, several state troopers claimed that they assisted then Governor Bill Clinton to cover extramarital affairs in what became known as "Troopergate". No official state inquiry was performed.
- On March 7, 2006, trooper Larry P. Norman fatally shot Joseph Erin Hamley, an unarmed man with cerebral palsy as he lay on his back. On June 28, 2007, Norman pleaded guilty to negligent homicide based on the dashcam footage and was sentenced to 90 days in jail, 30 days of community service, one year of probation, and a $1,000 fine. Norman served 54 days of his jail sentence. The Arkansas State Police settled a lawsuit on March 5, 2007, with the victim's family for one million dollars.
- In July 2020, Senior Cpl. Rodney Dunn performed a PIT maneuver against a pregnant woman during a traffic stop. Shortly thereafter, the woman filed a lawsuit against the department, claiming that she was in the process of pulling over, and that the actions of Dunn were reckless and nearly killed her and her unborn child. The Arkansas State Police has defended the trooper's actions and argue neither he nor the department bear any responsibility for the incident. The Arkansas State Police and the woman have settled the lawsuit in November 2021.

== In popular culture ==
- The third season of HBO's True Detective depicted Mahershala Ali and Stephen Dorff as Arkansas State Police detectives.
- In the 1973 film White Lightning starring Burt Reynolds, the Arkansas State Police are seen pursuing Reynolds bootlegging character, Gator McKlusky.

== Notables ==
- Wayne Hays (fictional)
- Tommy F. Robinson
- Dwight Tosh

== See also ==
- List of law enforcement agencies in Arkansas
- Police misconduct in the United States
