= Arkansas Cabinet =

The Cabinet of the governor of Arkansas is a body of the most senior appointed officials of the executive branch of the government of Arkansas. Cabinet officers are appointed by the governor. Once confirmed, all members of the Cabinet receive the title "Secretary" and serve at the pleasure of the governor. The Cabinet is responsible for advising the governor on the operations and policies of the state government department under their purview.

== History ==
The cabinet system was created by Governor Asa Hutchinson. The Transformation and Efficiencies Act of 2019 was his signature piece of legislation, consolidating 40 state government departments into 15, with each headed by a cabinet secretary. Arkansas state government had been last reorganized in 1971.

== Current cabinet members ==
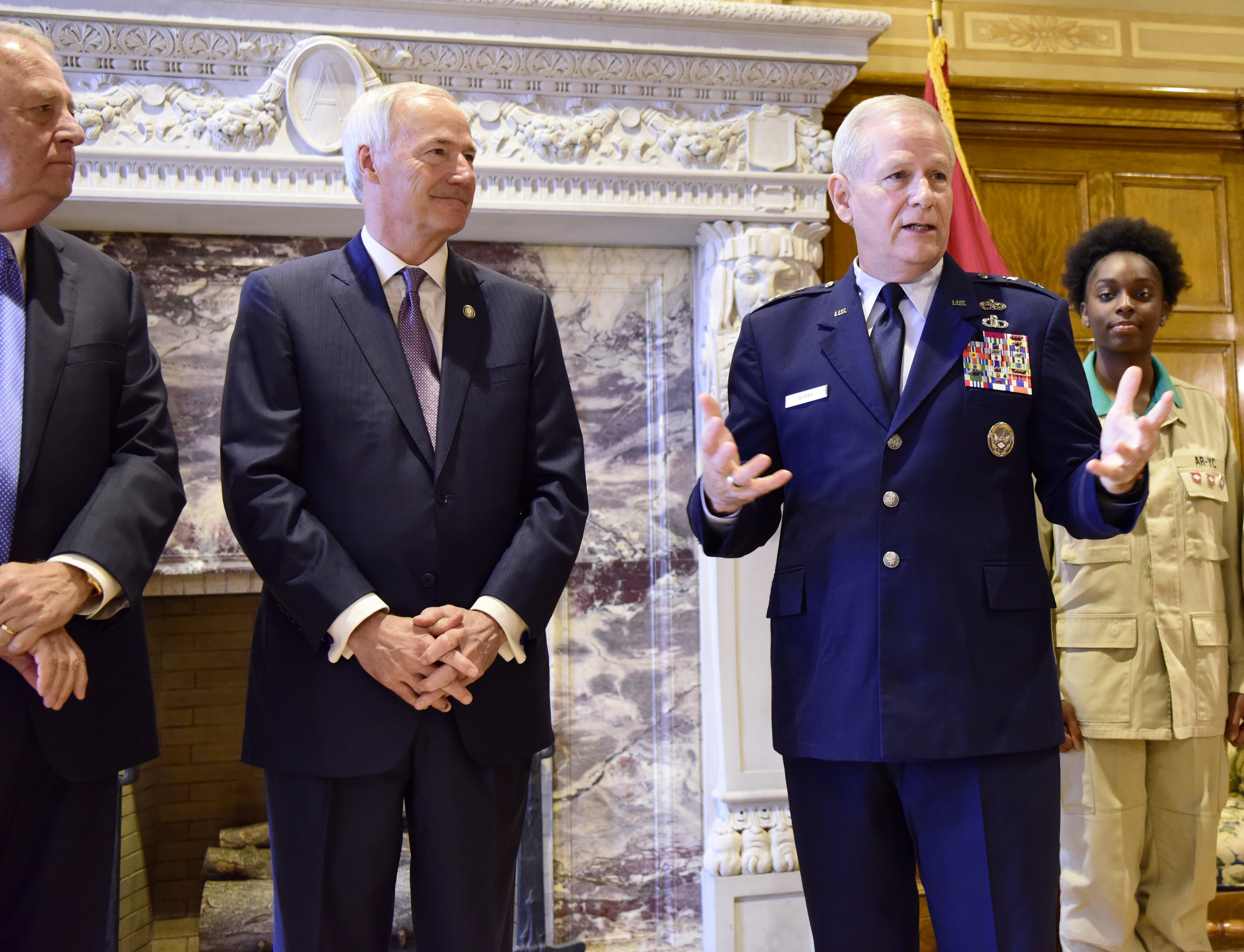
Governor Hutchinson with former Department of the Military Secretary Major General Mark Berry

The current Cabinet is as follows:

Department	Incumbent	Initial Appointment	Notes
Arkansas Department of Agriculture	Wes Ward	Asa Hutchinson	
Arkansas Department of Commerce	Hugh McDonald	Sarah Huckabee Sanders	
Arkansas Department of Corrections	Lindsay Wallace	Sanders	
Arkansas Department of Education	Jacob Oliva	Sanders	
Arkansas Department of Energy and Environment	Shane E. Khoury	Sanders	
Arkansas Department of Finance and Administration	Jim Hudson	Sanders	
Arkansas Department of Health	Renee Mallory, RN, BSN	Hutchinson	
Arkansas Department of Human Services	Janet Mann	Sanders	
Arkansas Department of the Inspector General	Allison Bragg	Sanders	
Arkansas Department of Labor and Licensing	Daryl E. Bassett	Hutchinson	
Arkansas Department of the Military	Brigadier General Olen Chad Bridges	Sanders	
Arkansas Department of Parks, Heritage, and Tourism	Shea Lewis	Sanders	
Arkansas Department of Public Safety	Mike Hagar	Sanders	
Arkansas Department of Shared Administrative Services	Leslie Fisken	Sanders	
Arkansas Department of Veterans Affairs	Robert A. Ator	Sanders	

Though the Arkansas Department of Transportation (ArDOT) is a similarly-named agency, the ArDOT director reports to the Arkansas State Highway Commission, and is independent of the governor.

== See also ==
- Government of Arkansas
- Cabinet of the United States
- List of Arkansas state agencies
