= Government of Arkansas =

Government of the U.S. state of Arkansas

- Logo of the Arkansan government
- Polity type: Sub-national administrative division (federated state)
- Part of: United States of America
- Constitution: Constitution of Arkansas

Legislative branch
- Name: General Assembly
- Type: Bicameral
- Meeting place: Arkansas State Capitol
- Upper house
- Name: Senate
- Presiding officer: Leslie Rutledge, President
- Lower house
- Name: House of Representatives
- Presiding officer: Matthew Shepherd, Speaker

Executive branch
- Head of state and government
- Title: Governor
- Currently: Sarah Huckabee Sanders
- Appointer: Election
- Cabinet
- Name: Cabinet of Arkansas
- Leader: Governor
- Deputy leader: Lieutenant Governor
- Headquarters: State Capitol

Judicial branch
- Name: Judiciary of Arkansas
- Courts: Courts of Arkansas
- Arkansas Supreme Court
- Chief judge: Karen R. Baker
- Seat: Little Rock

United States presidential election results for Arkansas
Year	Republican / Whig		Democratic		Third party(ies)	
Year	No.	%	No.	%	No.	%
1836	1,334	35.92%	2,380	64.08%	0	0.00%
1840	5,160	43.58%	6,679	56.42%	0	0.00%
1844	5,604	36.99%	9,546	63.01%	0	0.00%
1848	7,587	44.93%	9,301	55.07%	0	0.00%
1852	7,404	37.82%	12,173	62.18%	0	0.00%
1856	0	0.00%	21,910	67.12%	10,732	32.88%
1860	0	0.00%	5,357	9.89%	48,795	90.11%
1868	22,112	53.68%	19,078	46.32%	0	0.00%
1872	41,373	52.17%	37,927	47.83%	0	0.00%
1876	38,649	39.87%	58,086	59.92%	211	0.22%
1880	41,661	38.66%	60,489	56.13%	5,622	5.22%
1884	51,198	40.70%	72,734	57.83%	1,847	1.47%
1888	59,752	38.04%	86,062	54.80%	11,244	7.16%
1892	47,072	31.78%	87,834	59.30%	13,211	8.92%
1896	37,512	25.12%	110,103	73.72%	1,732	1.16%
1900	44,800	35.04%	81,142	63.46%	1,924	1.50%
1904	46,860	40.25%	64,434	55.35%	5,127	4.40%
1908	56,624	37.30%	87,015	57.31%	8,183	5.39%
1912	25,585	20.45%	68,814	55.01%	30,705	24.54%
1916	48,879	28.73%	112,211	65.97%	9,014	5.30%
1920	71,117	38.73%	107,409	58.49%	5,111	2.78%
1924	40,564	29.28%	84,795	61.21%	13,173	9.51%
1928	77,751	39.33%	119,196	60.29%	746	0.38%
1932	28,467	12.91%	189,602	85.96%	2,493	1.13%
1936	32,039	17.86%	146,765	81.80%	619	0.34%
1940	42,121	20.98%	158,622	79.02%	0	0.00%
1944	63,551	29.84%	148,965	69.95%	438	0.21%
1948	50,959	21.02%	149,659	61.72%	41,857	17.26%
1952	177,155	43.76%	226,300	55.90%	1,345	0.33%
1956	186,287	45.82%	213,277	52.46%	7,008	1.72%
1960	184,508	43.06%	215,049	50.19%	28,952	6.76%
1964	243,264	43.41%	314,197	56.06%	2,965	0.53%
1968	189,062	31.01%	184,901	30.33%	235,627	38.65%
1972	445,751	68.82%	198,899	30.71%	3,016	0.47%
1976	268,753	34.93%	499,614	64.94%	1,029	0.13%
1980	403,164	48.13%	398,041	47.52%	36,377	4.34%
1984	534,774	60.47%	338,646	38.29%	10,986	1.24%
1988	466,578	56.37%	349,237	42.19%	11,923	1.44%
1992	337,324	35.48%	505,823	53.21%	107,506	11.31%
1996	325,416	36.80%	475,171	53.74%	83,675	9.46%
2000	472,940	51.31%	422,768	45.86%	26,073	2.83%
2004	572,898	54.31%	469,953	44.55%	12,094	1.15%
2008	638,017	58.72%	422,310	38.86%	26,290	2.42%
2012	647,744	60.57%	394,409	36.88%	27,315	2.55%
2016	684,872	60.57%	380,494	33.65%	65,310	5.78%
2020	760,647	62.40%	423,932	34.78%	34,490	2.83%
2024	759,241	64.20%	396,905	33.56%	26,530	2.24%

The state government of Arkansas is divided into three branches: executive, legislative and judicial. These consist of the state governor's office, a bicameral state legislature known as the Arkansas General Assembly, and a state court system. The Arkansas Constitution delineates the structure and function of the state government. Since 1963, Arkansas has had four seats in the U.S. House of Representatives. Like all other states, it has two seats in the U.S. Senate.

The state was historically part of the Solid South, and was a one-party state dominated by Democrats. Arkansas was the only state in the nation not carried by Republicans at least once between 1876 and 1968, although it voted for segregationist George Wallace in 1968. It was the only Deep South state carried by Lyndon Johnson in 1964, just following the passage of the Civil Rights Act, however, Democratic support did weaken after this. The state voted Republican for the first time in 100 years in 1972, and became a swing state, voting for the national winner in every election from 1972 to 2004. In 2008, the state continued in rightward turn in the 21st century, when Democrat Barack Obama became the first Democrat to win the presidency without carrying the state. Democrats lost the state legislature in 2012 and lost control of all statewide and congressional offices by 2014.

Reflecting the state's large evangelical population, the state has a strong socially conservative bent. The 1874 Arkansas Constitution established Arkansas as a right to work state (a provision then directed against union organizers). In the early 21st century an initiative to restrict same-sex marriage passed by a 3:1 margin, although the United States Supreme Court overrode this in 2015 with its Obergefell v. Hodges decision. Abortion in Arkansas is illegal except when it is necessary to save the life of the mother.

== Political history ==
=== Democrats ===
Since the late 19th century, Southern Democrats of Arkansas have traditionally had an overwhelming majority of registered voters in the state. At that time, they consolidated their power and achieved effective disfranchisement of African Americans (and Republican) voters by passage of the Election Law of 1891 and a poll tax amendment in 1892, which also dropped many poor white Democrats from the rolls. Together these also suppressed the coalition of Republican and farmer-labor parties, which had threatened the Democrats. Assessing fees to register and vote resulted in many poor people being dropped from voter rolls. The Election Law set up secret ballots and standardized ballots in progressive reforms that also made voting more complicated and effectively closed out illiterate voters. It set up a state election board and officials, putting power into the hands of the Democratic Party, rather than county workers. Voter rolls declined for both black and white voters. By 1895, there were no longer any African-American representatives in the state house. African Americans were closed out of the political system for decades and this continued after the advent of the Southern Strategy where Republicans became the more conservative party while the Democrats became less so as the parties essentially swapped positions over the civil rights movement as of 1954.

In the 20th and 21st centuries, Arkansas Democrats have tended to be more conservative than their national counterparts, particularly in areas outside metropolitan Little Rock. Traditionally having strength in most areas outside the Northwest and North Central parts of the state, in the 21st century Democrats in Arkansas predominate along the Mississippi River in the East, in central Little Rock, and around Pine Bluff and the areas south of there along the Louisiana border.

=== Republicans ===
Historically Republicans in the state were based in the northwestern areas, long a supporter of the Unionist cause in the Civil War. These were areas of yeomen farmers in the antebellum years. Planters and major slaveholders lived in the Delta area along the Mississippi River and tended to ally with the Democratic Party. As noted above, the disenfranchisement of African Americans and the consolidation of power by the Democrats left the Republicans nearly powerless. They concentrated on developing patronage positions.

In 1966, Republican John Paul Hammerschmidt won a U.S. House seat from this northwestern area, the first Republican from Arkansas to be elected to Congress since after Reconstruction. He held the seat until 1992, when he retired. What was more surprising, that year multi-millionaire Winthrop Rockefeller was elected to the governorship. A 1950s migrant from New York, he was joined by Republican Maurice "Footsie" Britt, a World War II hero elected as lieutenant governor. Unlike in other parts of the South at the time, Rockefeller's coalition was based on "progressive Democrats and newly enfranchised black voters." They also elected him in 1968. Rockefeller faced resistance from the conservative Democratic legislature. In 1970 the Democrats put up their own progressive candidate and defeated Rockefeller. Rockefeller died in 1973, which weakened the emerging Republican Party. It was 1978 before Ed Bethune was elected to Congress as the second Republican from the state; he served three terms from central Arkansas.

It was not until the late 20th century that more white conservatives in Arkansas began to shift from the Democratic to the Republican Party. In 1989 Democratic Congressman Tommy Robinson announced his shift to the Republican Party, an indication of change. The party continues to be strongest in the northwestern part of the state, due to historic conditions of that area, particularly in Fort Smith and Bentonville, as well as North Central Arkansas around the Mountain Home area. In the latter area, Republicans have been known to get 90 percent or more of the vote.

While the rest of the state used to be more Democratic, since the late 20th century Republicans have attracted members from the Little Rock suburbs, the southwest (especially Texarkana), and the northeast around Jonesboro. Tim Hutchinson, elected in 1996, was the first Republican U.S. Senator from Arkansas since Reconstruction. As an indication of increasing Republican strength in the state, in 2008, Republican nominee John McCain defeated Democratic nominee Barack Obama by 19.9%, the largest margin of victory for a candidate in Arkansas since 1984 despite McCain losing nationally.

=== History since 1992 ===
Arkansas Governor Bill Clinton, a Democrat, was elected president of the United States in 1992 and was reelected in 1996. In the former election, the state was the only one in the nation to give majority support to Clinton. However, the state has voted Republican by increasing margins in every presidential election since 1996, the longest such streak of any state in the nation, as of 2024.

Former First Lady of Arkansas and First Lady of the United States, Hillary Clinton, was elected a United States Senator for New York in 2000.

The state voted for John McCain in 2008 by a margin of 20 percentage points, making it one of the few states in the country to vote more Republican that year than it had in 2004. (The others were Louisiana, Tennessee, Oklahoma, and West Virginia.) Even while supporting Republican candidates for president, Arkansas voters continued to favor Democrats for statewide offices. In 2006, Democrats were elected to all statewide offices in a Democratic sweep that included regaining the governorship. However, in the 2010s, the Republican dominance at the presidential level spread to the local level. In 2012, they captured both chambers of the state legislature for the first time since Reconstruction. Republicans had won all statewide offices and all congressional seats in 2014, and won both Senate seats for the first time since Reconstruction. Republicans have consistently captured over 60% of the vote in statewide elections since 2012.

== Local government ==
As in the national government of the United States, political power in Arkansas is divided into three main branches: Executive, Legislative, and Judicial. Each officer's term is four years long. Office holders are term-limited to two full terms plus any partial terms before the first full term. Arkansas governors served two-year terms until a referendum lengthened the term to four years, effective with the 1986 general election. Statewide elections are held two years after presidential elections.

Some of Arkansas's counties have two county seats, as opposed to the usual one seat. The arrangement dates back to when travel was extremely difficult in the state. The seats are usually on opposite sides of the county to serve residents within easier traveling distances. Although travel conditions have improved, there are few efforts to eliminate the two-seat arrangement where it exists, since the county seat is a source of pride (and jobs) to the cities involved.

Arkansas is the only state to specify by law the pronunciation of its name (AR-kan-saw). (Note: The name Arkansas has been pronounced and spelled in a variety of fashions. The region was organized as the Territory of Arkansaw on July 4, 1819, but the territory was admitted to the United States as the state of Arkansas on June 15, 1836. The name was historically /ˈɑːrkənsɔː/, /ɑːrˈkænzəs/, and several other variants. The people of Arkansas call themselves either "Arkansans" or "Arkansawyers". In 1881, the Arkansas General Assembly passed the following concurrent resolution, now Arkansas Code 1-4-105 (official text): Whereas, confusion of practice has arisen in the pronunciation of the name of our state and it is deemed important that the true pronunciation should be determined for use in oral official proceedings. And, whereas, the matter has been thoroughly investigated by the State Historical Society and the Eclectic Society of Little Rock, which have agreed upon the correct pronunciation as derived from history, and the early usage of the American immigrants. Be it therefore resolved by both houses of the General Assembly, that the only true pronunciation of the name of the state, in the opinion of this body, is that received by the French from the native Indians and committed to writing in the French word representing the sound. It should be pronounced in three (3) syllables, with the final "s" silent, the "a" in each syllable with the Italian sound, and the accent on the first and last syllables. The pronunciation with the accent on the second syllable with the sound of "a" in "man" and the sounding of the terminal "s" is an innovation to be discouraged. Residents of the state of Kansas often pronounce the Arkansas River as /ɑːrˈkænzəs ˈrɪvər/, in a manner similar to the common pronunciation of the name of their state.)

Article 19 (Miscellaneous Provisions), Item 1 in the Arkansas Constitution is entitled "Atheists disqualified from holding office or testifying as witness," and states that "No person who denies the being of a God shall hold any office in the civil departments of this State, nor be competent to testify as a witness in any Court." In 1961, the United States Supreme Court in Torcaso v. Watkins (1961), held that a similar requirement in Maryland was unenforceable because it violated the First and Fourteenth Amendments to the US Constitution. The latter amendment, per current precedent, makes the federal Bill of Rights binding on the states. As a result, this 'religious test' provision has not been enforced in modern times. It would be overturned if challenged in court.

== Executive branch ==
The daily administration of the state's laws are carried out by the chief executive—the governor, and their second in command the lieutenant governor, the secretary of state, the attorney general, the commissioner of state lands, the state treasurer, the state auditor, and by the staff and employees of the 15 executive branch departments.

Elected executive officials in Arkansas
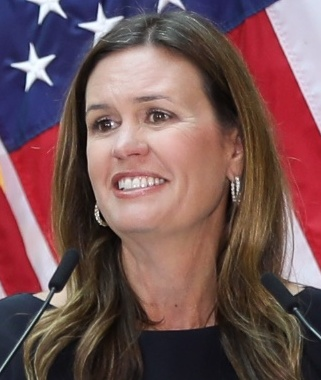
Sarah Huckabee Sanders (R)
Governor

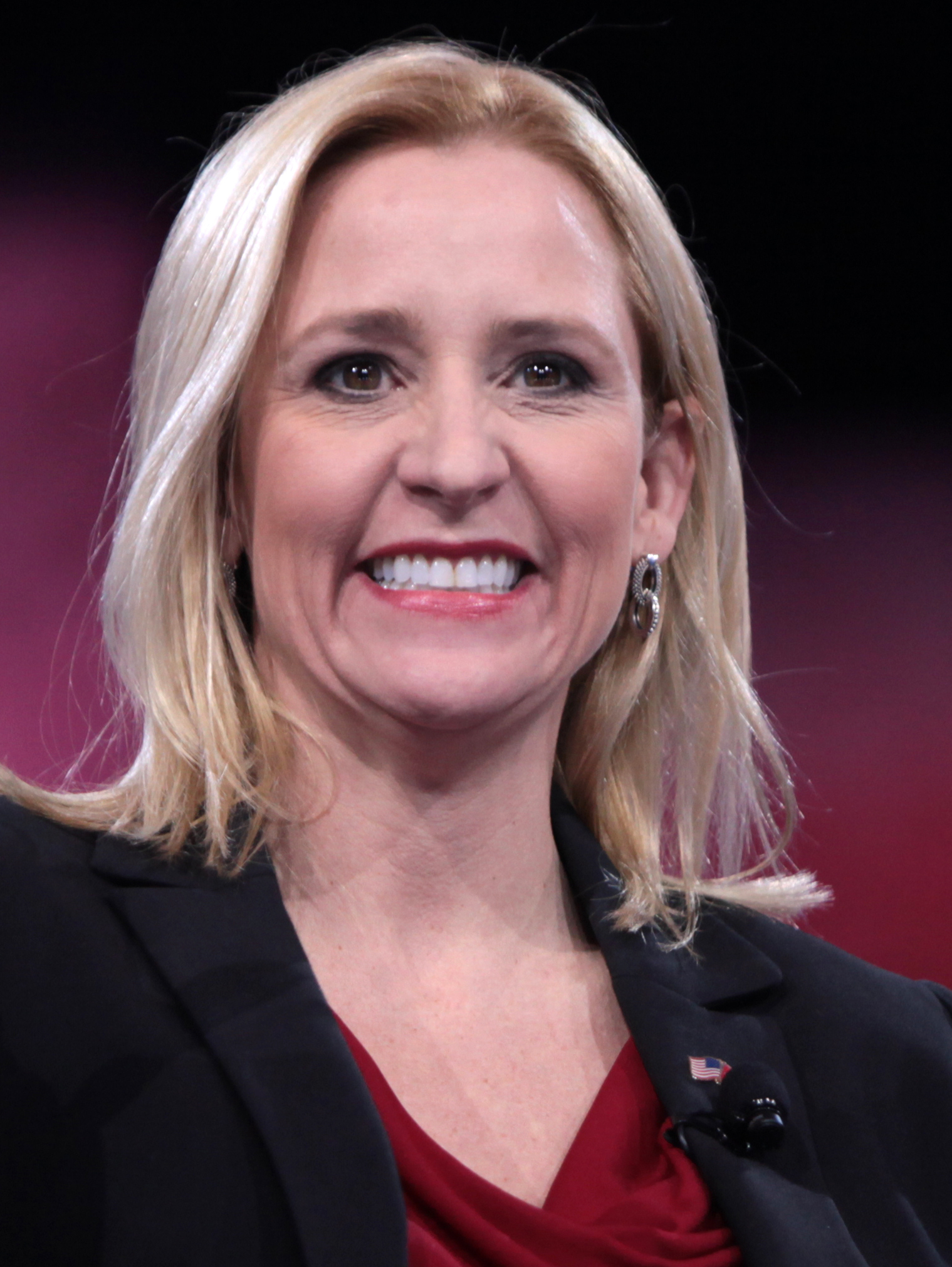
Leslie Rutledge (R)
Lieutenant Governor

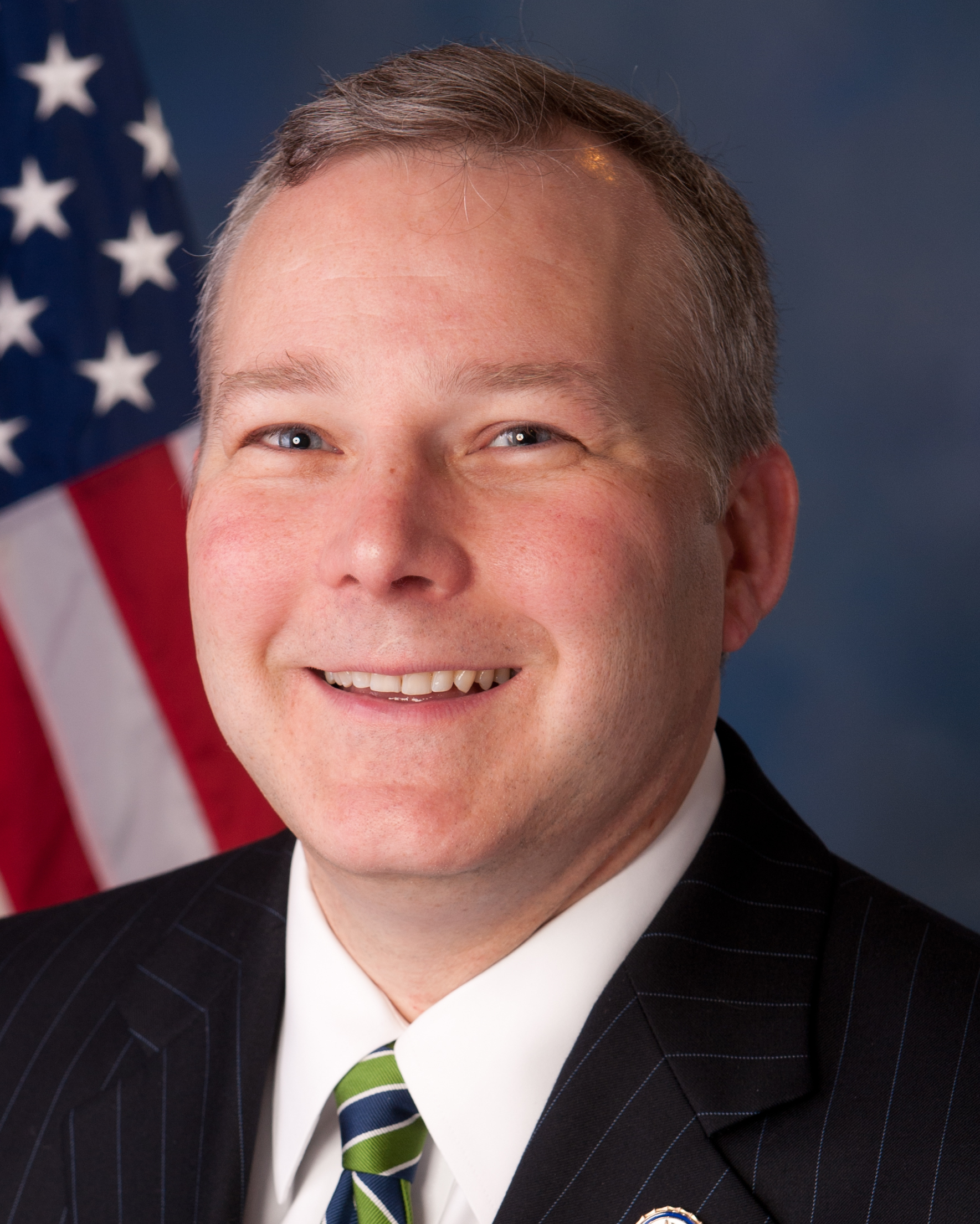
Tim Griffin (R)
Attorney General

Cole Jester (R)
Secretary of State

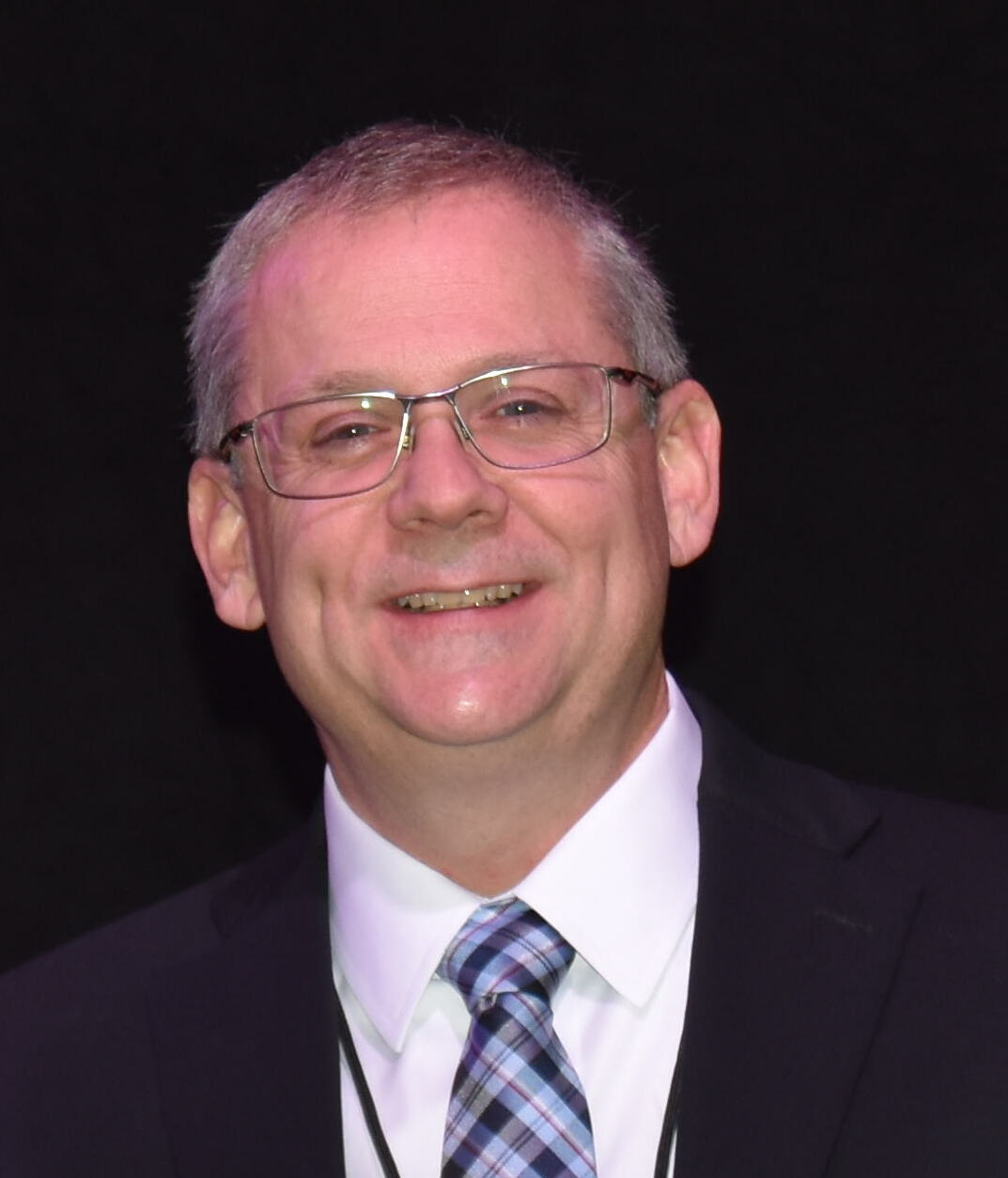
John Thurston (R)
State Treasurer

Dennis Milligan (R)
State Auditor

Tommy Land (R)
Commissioner of State Lands

=== Governor ===
The current governor of Arkansas is Sarah Huckabee Sanders, a Republican, who was elected on November 8, 2022. Arkansas also elects the lieutenant governor and several cabinet-level positions: secretary of state, attorney general, treasurer, auditor, and land commissioner. The governor appoints qualified individuals to lead various state boards, committees, and departments.

In Arkansas, the lieutenant governor is elected separately from the governor and can be from a different political party.

Following reorganization in 2019, state government is subdivided into fifteen departments, each led by a cabinet-level official (titled secretary):

- Department of Agriculture
- Department of Commerce
- Department of Corrections
- Department of Education
- Department of Energy & Environment
- Department of Finance and Administration
- Department of Health
- Department of Human Services
- Department of Inspector General
- Department of Labor and Licensing
- Department of the Military
- Department of Parks, Heritage, and Tourism
- Department of Public Safety
- Department of Transformation and Shared Services
- Department of Veteran Affairs

== Legislative branch ==
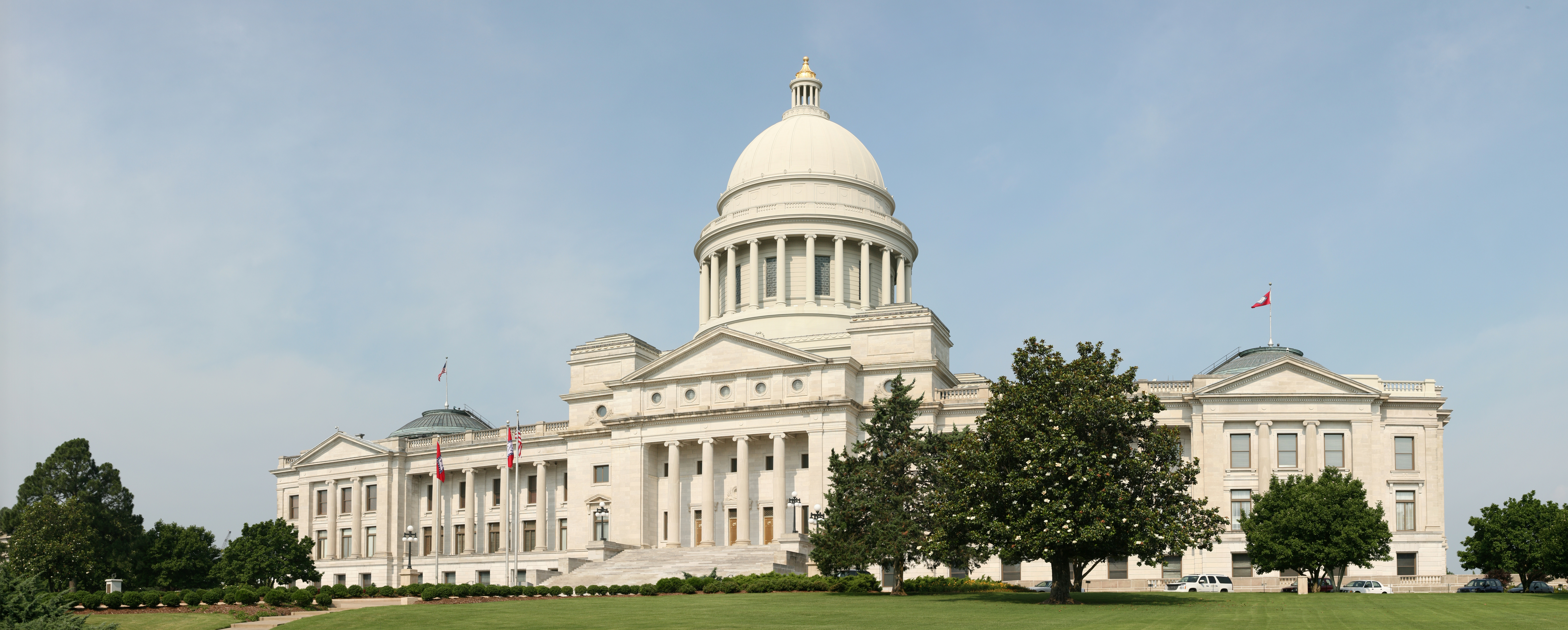
Arkansas State Capitol building in Little Rock designed by architect George R. Mann

The Arkansas General Assembly is the state's bicameral bodies of legislators, composed of the Senate and House of Representatives. Elections in the Arkansas Senate are staggered such that half the body is up for re-election every two years. Since the late 20th century, the Senate has 35 members from districts of approximately equal population. These districts are redrawn decennially with each US census. The entire state senate was up for reelection in 2012. Arkansas voters elected a 21-14 Republican majority in the Senate.

House districts are redistricted by the Arkansas Board of Apportionment. Following the 2012 elections, Republicans gained a 51–49 majority in the House of Representatives.

Following the 2014 elections, an amendment to the Arkansas Constitution was approved that expanded legislative term limits to 16 years total in either the Senate and House of Representatives. Prior to this, senators were limited to two four-year terms and representatives were limited to three two-year terms.

The Republican Party majority status in the Arkansas State House of Representatives following the 2012 elections is the party's first since 1874 during the Reconstruction era. Democrats regained control of the state house and suppressed black and Republican voters. At the turn of the century, the legislature passed a new constitution and laws disenfranchising most African Americans and establishing Jim Crow. African Americans were closed out of the political system for many decades. It was 2012 before the Republican Party re-established control of the state legislature.

=== Composition of the Arkansas legislature ===
Arkansas's legislature is controlled by the Republican Party, which gained the majority in both houses following the 2012 general election.

Arkansas House of Representatives

Arkansas State House, party breakdown 2012

Affiliation	Members
Republican	76
Democratic	24
Seat Vacant	0
Total	100

Arkansas Senate

Arkansas State Senate, party breakdown 2012

Affiliation	Members
Republicans	26
Democrats	9
Seat Vacant	0
Total	35

== Judiciary ==
Arkansas's judicial branch has five court systems: Arkansas Supreme Court, Arkansas Court of Appeals, Circuit Courts, District Courts and City Courts.

Most cases begin in district court, which is subdivided into state district court and local district court. State district courts exercise district-wide jurisdiction over the districts created by the General Assembly. Local district courts are presided over by part-time judges who may also privately practice law. Twenty-five state district court judges preside over 15 districts. The legislature has committed to establishing more districts in 2017 to accommodate growth in population.

There are 28 judicial circuits of Circuit Court, with each containing five subdivisions: criminal, civil, probate, domestic relations, and juvenile court. The jurisdiction of the Arkansas Court of Appeals is determined by the Arkansas Supreme Court. There is no right of appeal from the Court of Appeals to the high court. However, the Arkansas Supreme Court can review Court of Appeals cases upon application by either a party to the litigation, upon request by the Court of Appeals, or if the Arkansas Supreme Court believes the case should have been assigned to it. The twelve judges of the Arkansas Court of Appeals are elected from judicial districts to renewable six-year terms.

The Arkansas Supreme Court was established in 1836 by the Arkansas Constitution as the court of last resort in the state. It is composed of seven justices elected to eight-year terms. The court's decisions can be appealed only to the Supreme Court of the United States.

== Federal representation ==
=== U.S. Senate ===
Arkansas's two U.S. senators are elected at large:

- Senior U.S. Senator John Boozman (R)
- Junior U.S. Senator Tom Cotton (R)
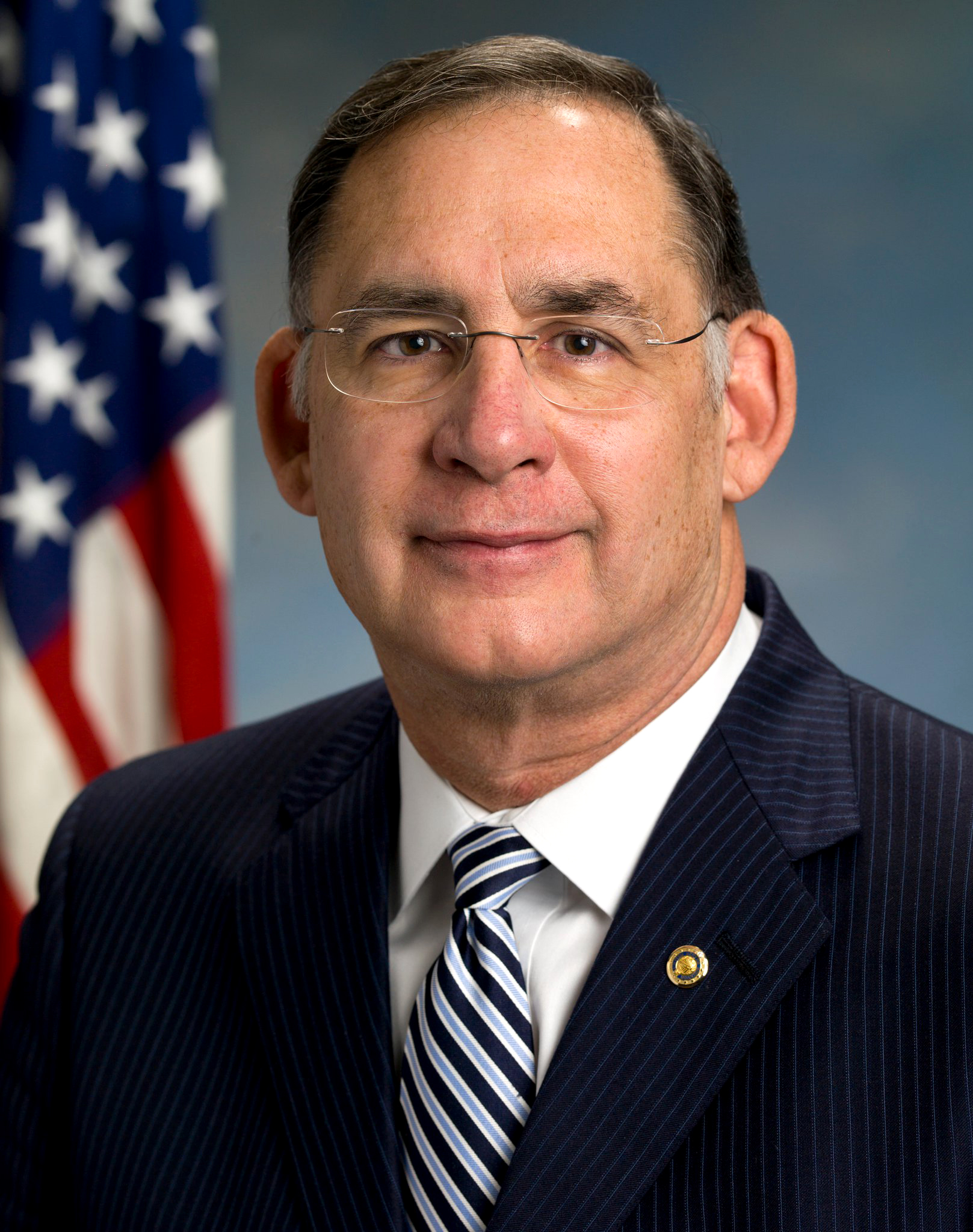
Senior Senator John Boozman

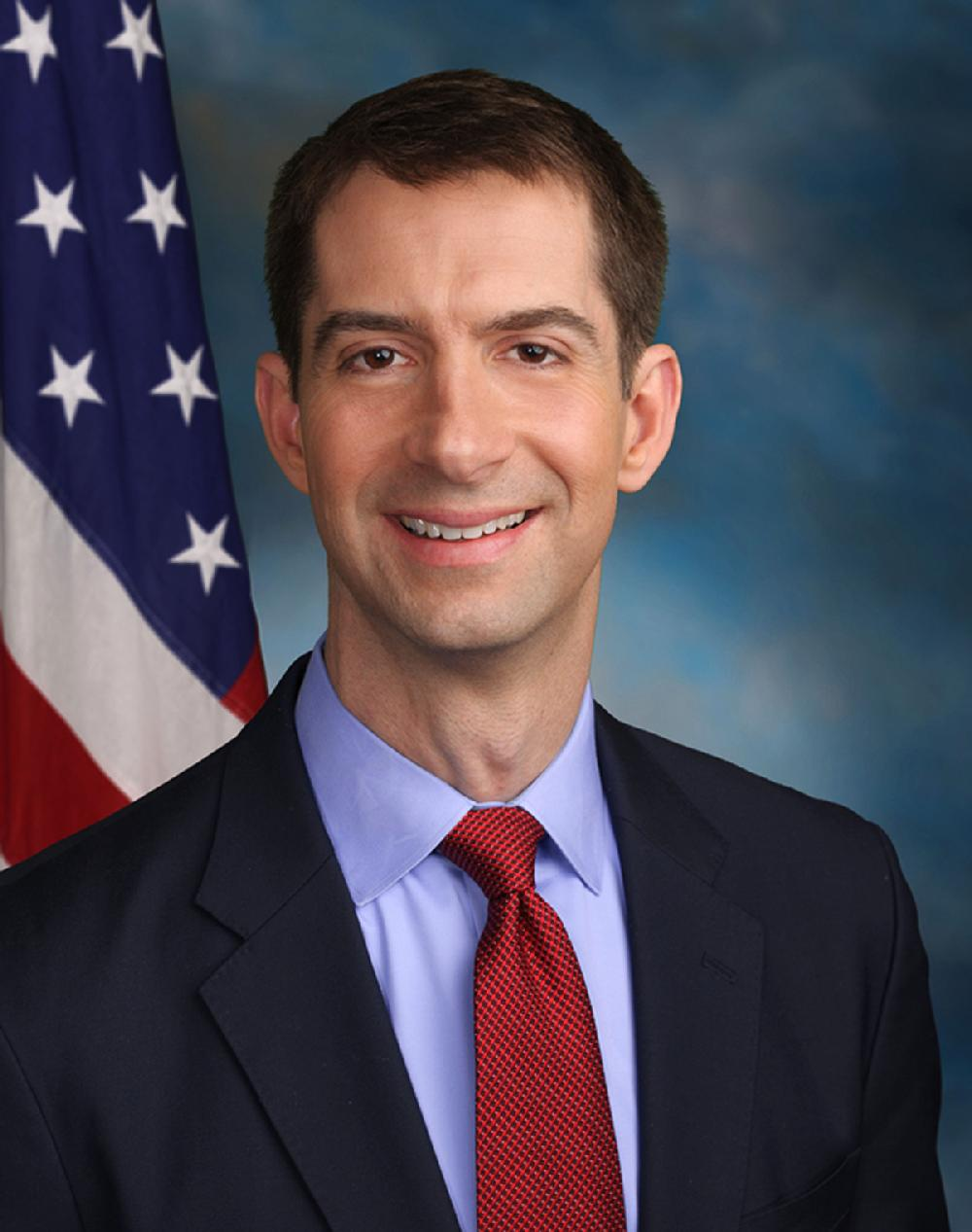
Junior Senator Tom Cotton

=== U.S. House of Representatives ===
Map of Arkansas showing all four congressional districts

Arkansas has four congressional districts. There were 5th, 6th, 7th, and at-large districts, but they were eliminated in 1963, 1963, 1953, and 1885, respectively in the U.S. House of Representatives:

- Arkansas's 1st congressional district includes the Crowley's Ridge region and most of the Arkansas Delta – Rep. Rick Crawford (R).
- Arkansas's 2nd congressional district covers the region generally called Central Arkansas, including Little Rock – Rep. French Hill (R).
- Arkansas's 3rd congressional district covers northwest Arkansas, including the Fayetteville–Springdale–Rogers Metropolitan Area and Fort Smith metropolitan area – Rep. Steve Womack (R)
- Arkansas's 4th congressional district covers South Arkansas and the Ouachita Mountains – Rep. Bruce Westerman (R).
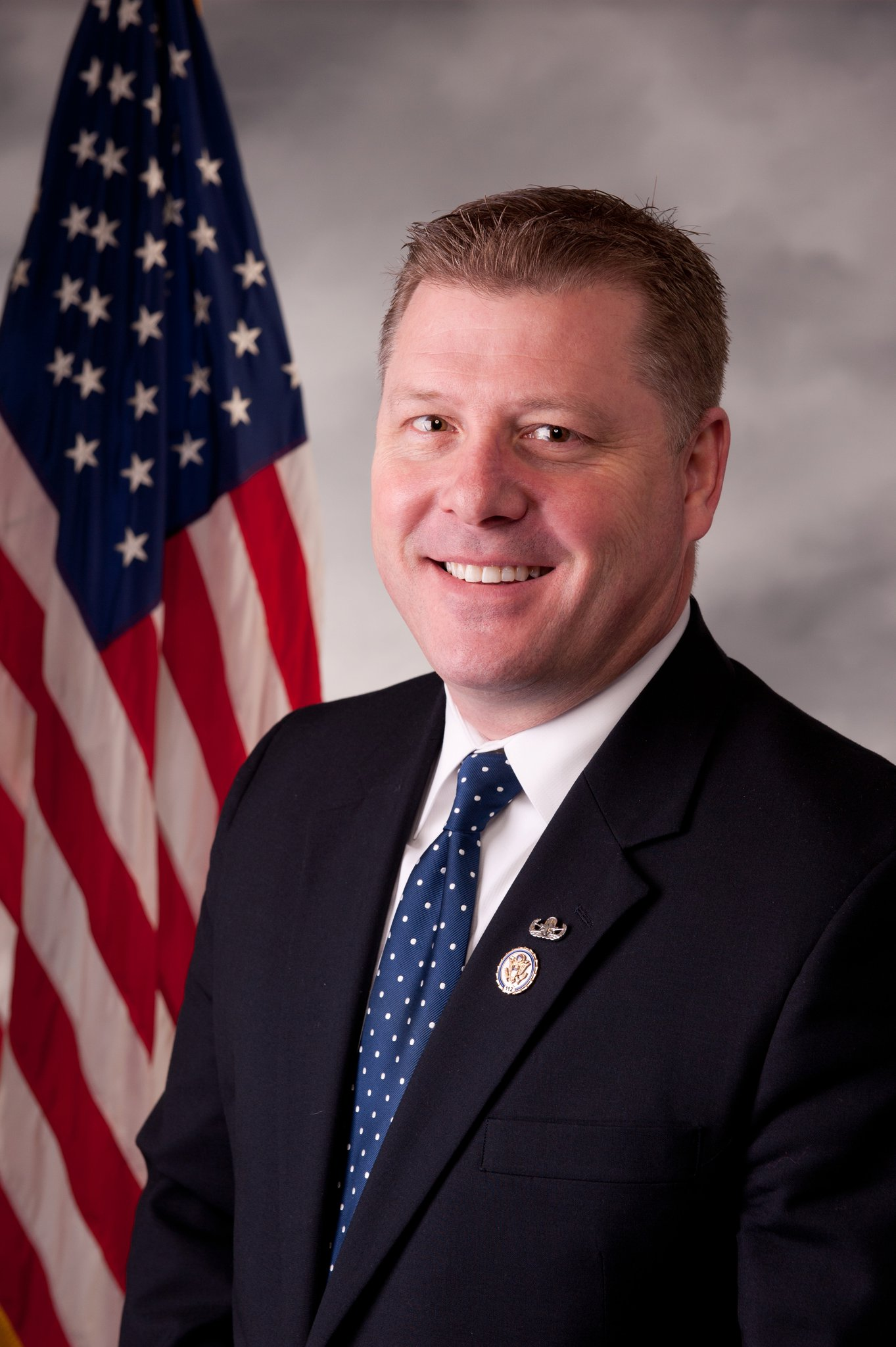
Rick Crawford, AR 1

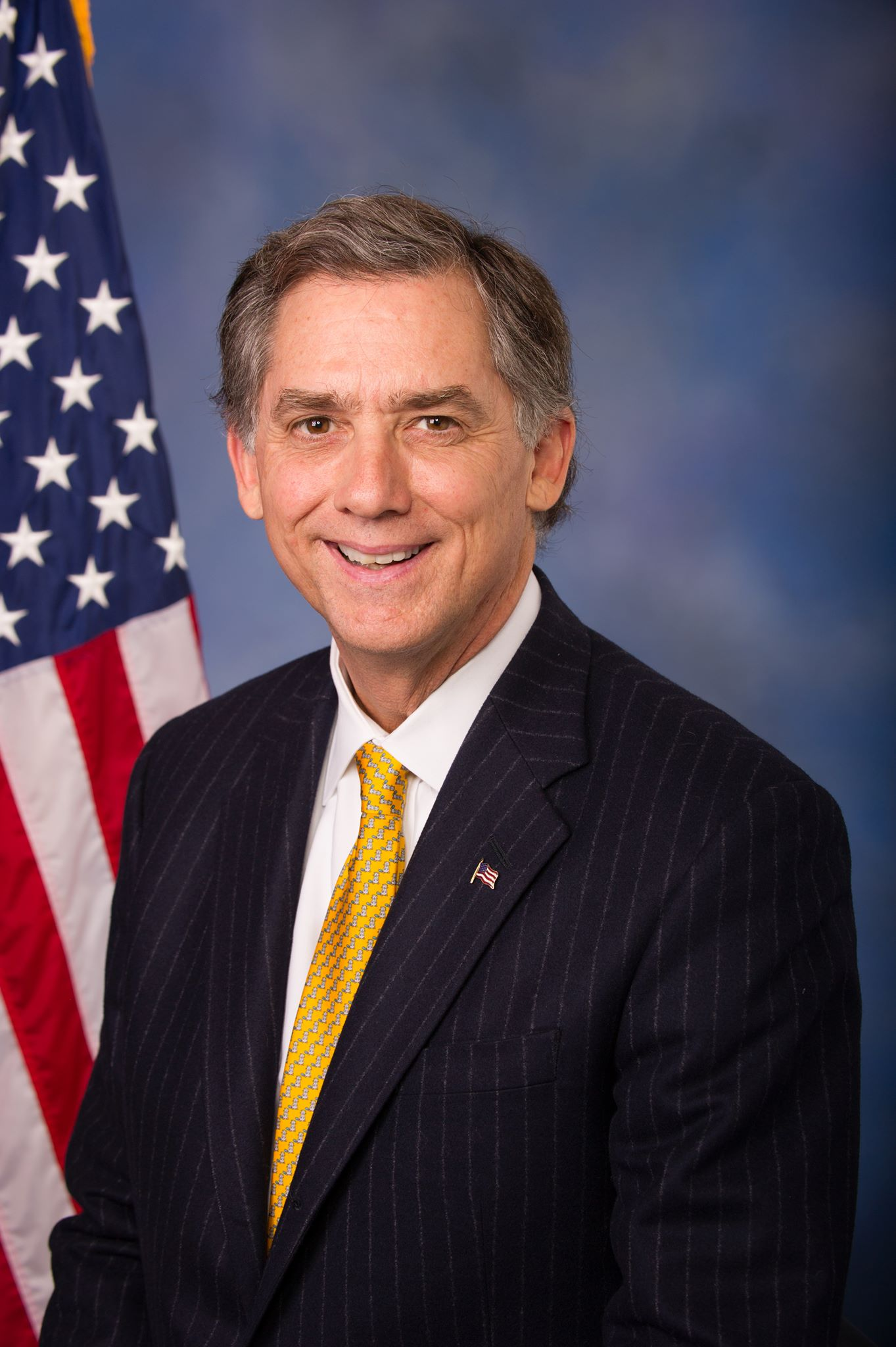
French Hill, AR 2

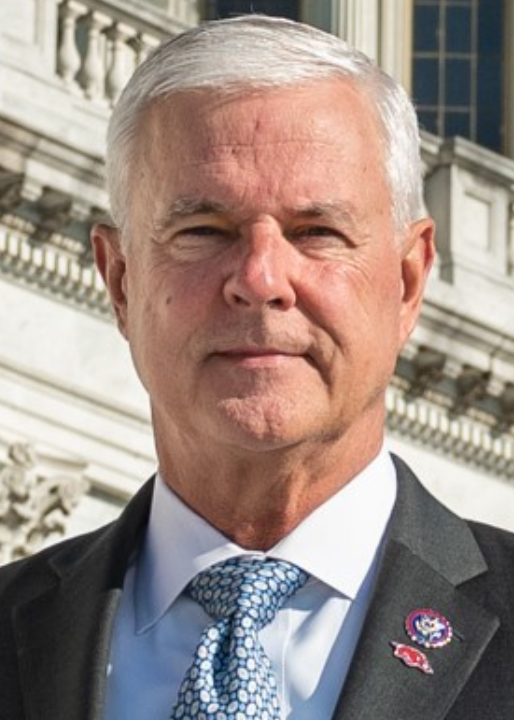
Steve Womack, AR 3

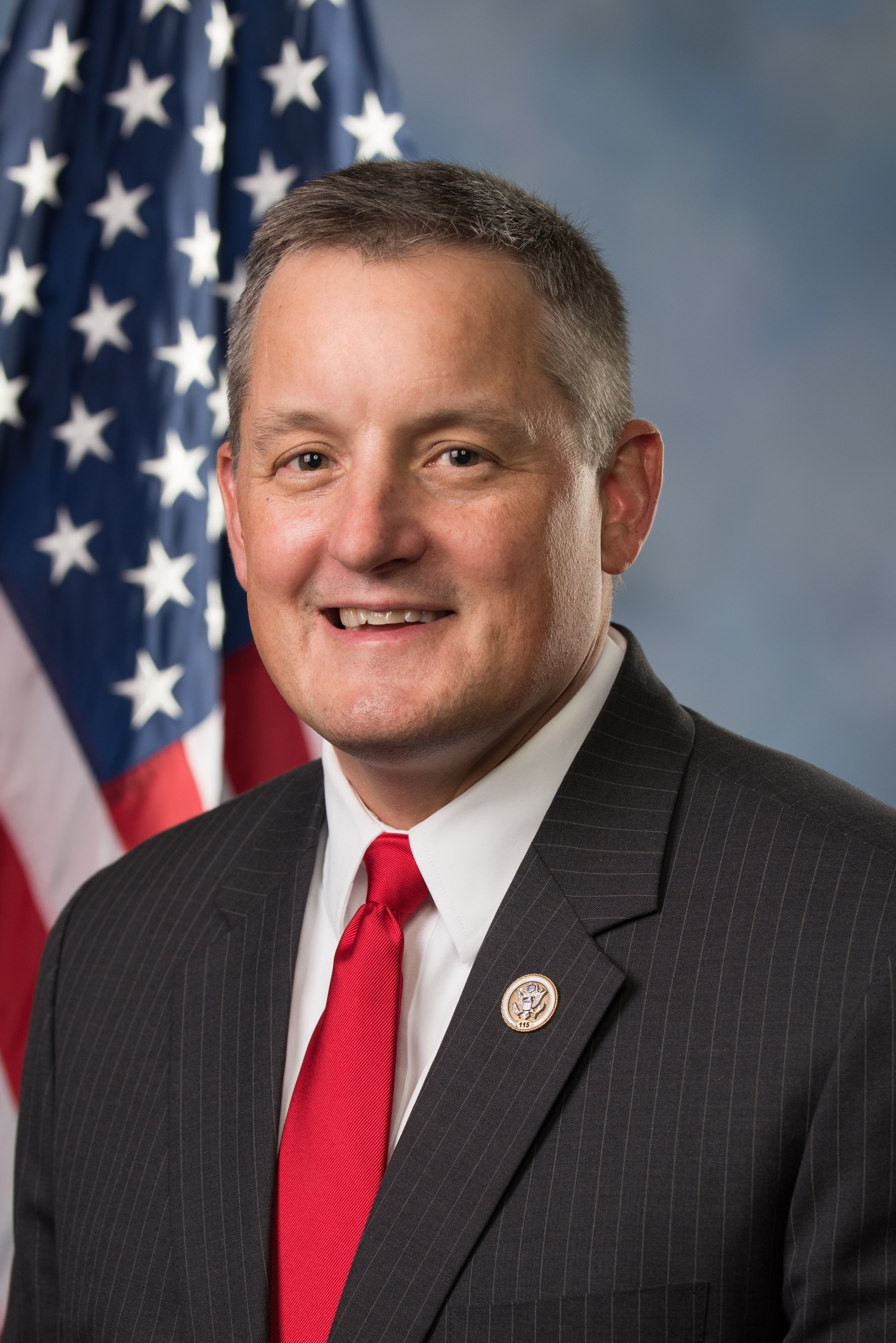
Bruce Westerman, AR 4

Arkansas remains the only former Confederate state that has never sent a Black representative to the U.S. House.

=== Judiciary ===
Arkansas is part of the United States District Court for the Western District of Arkansas and the United States District Court for the Eastern District of Arkansas in the federal judiciary. The district's cases are appealed to the St. Louis-based United States Court of Appeals for the Eighth Circuit.

== See also ==
- Arkansas's congressional delegations
- Arkansas's congressional districts
- Arkansas General Assembly
- Democratic Party of Arkansas
- Governor of Arkansas
- List of politics by U.S. state or territory
- List of United States representatives from Arkansas
- List of United States senators from Arkansas
- Political party strength in Arkansas
- Republican Party of Arkansas
