= Arkansas Department of Finance and Administration =

Government agency

Agency overview
- Jurisdiction: State of Arkansas
- Headquarters: 1509 W 7th Street; Little Rock, Arkansas
- Annual budget: ▲$621,773,118
- Agency executives: Jim Hudson, Chief Fiscal Officer of Arkansas, Secretary of DFA; Andy Babbitt, Comptroller; Alan McVey, Deputy Director & Chief of Staff; Charlie Collins, Commissioner of Revenue
- Key document: Constitution of Arkansas
- Website: dfa.arkansas.gov/

The Arkansas Department of Finance and Administration (commonly DFA within the state) is a department of the government of Arkansas under the Governor of Arkansas.

The DFA is a cabinet level agency in the executive branch of government responsible for providing citizens with tax, licensure, or child support service and state agencies in their administration and budgeting.

== Division of Finance ==
The Division of Finance is led by the Comptroller of Arkansas.

- Office of Accounting
- Office of Administrative Services
- Office of Economic Analysis and Tax Research
- Office of Intergovernmental Services

== Division of Management Services ==
The Division of Finance is led by the Deputy Director/Chief of Staff.

- Office of Budget
- Office of Accounting
- Office of Arkansas Lottery
- Office of Child Support Enforcement
- Office of Communications
- Office of Information Services
- Office of State Procurement
- Office of Personnel Management

== Division of Revenue ==
The Division of Finance is led by the Commissioner of Revenue.

- Office of Driver Services
- Office of Excise Tax Administration
- Office of Income Tax Administration
- Office of Field Audit Administration
- Office of Motor Vehicle
- Office of State Revenue Office Administration
- Office of Revenue Legal Counsel

== Boards and Commissions ==
In Arkansas's shared services model of state government, the cabinet-level agencies assist boards and commissions who have an overlapping scope. DFA supports:

Boards

- Alcohol Beverage Control Board
- Arkansas Medical Marijuana Control Board
- Lottery Retailer Advisory Board
- Tobacco Control Board

Commissions

- Arkansas Racing Commission

Councils

- Governor's Developmental Disability Council
