= Killing of Joseph Erin Hamley =

Killing by police in Arkansas, US

- Date: March 7, 2006
- Deaths: Joseph Hamley
- Accused: Larry P. Norman
- Charges: Negligent homicide
- Litigation: $1 million settled from lawsuit filed by Hamley's family

On March 7, 2006, Joseph Erin Hamley (February 3, 1985 – March 7, 2006), an unarmed man, was fatally shot by Arkansas State Trooper Larry P. Norman of West Fork, Arkansas. At 7 a.m. on March 7, 2006, Hamley, who had cerebral palsy, was walking alone on U.S. Route 412, just outside the community of Tontitown along the Benton-Washington county line when several Washington County deputies surrounded him. Four minutes later, before being identified, and while lying on the ground, a shotgun slug fired by Norman, an Arkansas State Trooper breaking police protocol and procedure killed Hamley. The fatal shooting was recorded from multiple vantage points on dashboard cameras of the various police cruisers present. Norman was indicted on and pleaded guilty to negligent homicide.

== Mistaken identity with Adam Lee Leadford ==
After the negligent homicide, the Washington County Sheriffs Department and Arkansas State Police stated they believed the mentally disabled Joseph Erin Hamley to be Adam Lee Leadford whom they described as an escaped convict.

Joseph Erin Hamley stood 5 ft 10 in (1.78 m) and weighed 175 pounds (79 kg). Leadford was 5 ft 6 in (1.68 m) and 160 pounds (73 kg). Leadford, then 18, was a Michigan teenager who ran away from a court-sponsored boot camp, where he was sentenced for vandalizing school buses and then struggling with an officer while resisting arrest. An unarmed Leadford was later shot in the throat by Springdale Police and arrested in a parking lot of a Wal-Mart on the evening of Joseph Erin Hamley's shooting death.

Director of Arkansas State Police Col. Steve Dozier stated at a press conference in Springdale, Arkansas on March 10, 2006 "Leadford had a .22 caliber rifle when he was stopped." Leadford had abandoned the weapon in a vehicle, and it was not on his person when he was shot by Springdale police after walking through a Wal-Mart. He is now serving 30 years in an Arkansas state prison.

== Response ==
The Washington County Deputies and Arkansas State Troopers present at the scene remained silent concerning the shooting for the first three days, until the head of Arkansas State Police Col. Steve Dozier traveled to Springdale, Arkansas, on March 10, 2006, to give a rare press conference. Dozier stated that he wanted to "reassure the public that a thorough investigation was under way" into the shooting that left a 21-year-old disabled man dead.

The director of Arkansas State Police addressed the media on the fatal police shooting with members of the Joseph Erin Hamley family in attendance. Col. Steve Dozier stated that the Arkansas State Trooper Larry Norman "'likely had memories of a recent police killing' when he shot and killed a mentally handicapped man mistaken for a Michigan 'jail escapee' known to be in the area."

Dozier said officers likely remembered Gassville policeman Jim Sell, who was shot and killed February 4, by a teenager (Jacob D. Robida) wanted in a hatchet-and-gun attack on a Massachusetts gay bar. "We also feel like, in the back of these officers' minds, was the Mountain Home incident," Dozier said. Dozier stated, "Hamley was built like, and looked like, Leadford." He stated that "the officers ordered Hamley to lie down, and Hamley instead responded by putting his hands in his pockets and taking them out." Colonel Steve Dozier stated, Hamley "began moving in a manner that these officers, at that point, interpreted as movement toward a weapon that they thought was likely concealed in his waist." When Joseph Erin Hamley's family started to ask questions concerning the length of time Larry Norman had been at the scene and if Joseph was asked his identity, officers at the news conference deflected the questions saying there would be a more appropriate time to discuss the matter with the Hamley family.

Head of Arkansas State Police Col. Steve Dozier resigned at the end of May 2007 stating he was stepping down to go to work as vice president of corporate services for Wal-Mart Stores Inc. He retired one month before the final sentencing of Arkansas State Trooper Larry Norman for negligent homicide and the release of the Benton County special grand jury report with the police cruiser dash camera videos that followed.

== Aftermath ==
=== Dashcam videos ===
The Arkansas State Police and Washington County Sheriff departments refused to release the dash cam videos of the incident until after Arkansas State Trooper Larry Norman was sentenced. The trial date was postponed twice, before Norman finally pleaded guilty. When released the video recordings from inside Norman's cruiser clearly show he sped to the site, sometimes going over 100 mph, with his AM/FM radio blasting so loud he could not hear his police radio. By the time Norman arrived at the scene, Arkansas State Trooper Short and four Washington County Sheriff's deputies had surrounded Hamley. They had their guns drawn and were taking defensive positions behind their cars. One officer mentioned that if he could get close enough to Hamley, he would use his Taser stun gun. Instead of blocking traffic as he was instructed to do, Arkansas State Trooper Larry Norman did a U-turn and pulled up about 25 yards from the young man and pulled out his shotgun.

=== Grand jury ===
Before making its decision, the panel of 16 jurors viewed videotaped interviews with officers who were at the scene of the shooting, including Norman, and viewed recordings from cameras installed on the squad cars. They also went to the site itself, along Highway 412, where cars were placed in the same positions and locations as the patrol cars were at the time of the shooting. A mannequin placed at the site represented Hamley's body. They determined Hamley, who had cerebral palsy, followed officers' instructions to get down on the ground, but laid down on his back instead of his abdomen.

The Benton County Special Grand Jury found that possibly in an effort to comply with the trooper's instructions to roll over, when Larry Norman directed Joseph Erin Hamley to turn over, Hamley reached across his body. That's when Norman shot one time, the slug hitting the pavement, then striking Hamley's arm and going into his body. When officers approached him, Hamley moaned, saying, "I'm sorry". He then asked, "Why did you shoot me?"

The grand jury noted that Trooper Norman was on the scene for less than one minute when he shot Hamley, and that he "made no attempt to communicate with State Trooper Wilson Short or the Washington County Sheriff's deputies" that had the situation under control. "We will note that we are extremely troubled by the lack of communication between the officers from the Arkansas State Police themselves and, too, with the Washington County Sheriff's Deputies, who were on a scrambled radio frequency," the grand jury concluded "as a result of their lack of communication, there was no coordinated plan of action between them. … We will also note that we are disturbed by the fact that there was no attempt to positively identify the subject prior to the shooting," stated the grand jury, and they were "concerned that the officers' microphones were either turned off or nonexistent, preventing recordings to be made of their conversations during and after the incident." Several toy balls that were taken from Hamley's pockets after he was fatally shot were also viewed by the grand jury.

On April 13, 2006, Norman was indicted by the grand jury on a charge of negligent homicide. On June 28, 2007, Norman pleaded guilty to the charge and was sentenced to 90 days in jail, 30 days of community service, one year of probation, and a $1,000 fine. Norman served 54 days of his jail sentence. The Arkansas State Police settled a lawsuit on March 5, 2007, with the victim's family for one million dollars. Norman was later granted a full early medical retirement from the Arkansas State Police at the age of 40.

=== Conflict of interest accusations ===
In May 2006, Arkansas State Police Sergeant and investigator in the fatal police shooting of Joseph Erin Hamley, Steve Coppinger stated that he saw no problem with sending an email to fellow troopers asking for donations to the legal defense fund of Arkansas State Trooper Larry Norman after he was appointed as the lead investigator in the case. Sergeant Coppinger told the Arkansas Democrat-Gazette, "I don't see a conflict at all." Later that month, a department spokesperson with the Arkansas State Police said that "Coppinger is now being investigated to determine whether he violated department policy by sending the email on his police computer and workplace email account."

== Proposed rename ==
After the shooting death, the Springdale City Council received a proposal to rename Grove Street Park the Joseph Erin Hamley Memorial Park in honor of Hamley, who spent a lot of time on a swing set in the park. The Arkansas State Police contacted the City Council stating that it would not be proper to rename the park while the investigation was still on-going. The Arkansas State Police later settled out of court with the victim's family, and the Grove Street Park was not renamed.

== Sealed records ==
The probate case files concerning the terms of the Arkansas State Police settlement with the Joseph Erin Hamley estate, which are normally open to the public, were sealed from the public by a judge in Washington County on February 15, 2007.

== See also ==
- List of cases of police brutality
- List of killings by law enforcement officers in the United States
