= Arkansas Department of Energy and Environment =

Cabinet level agency of Arkansas' government

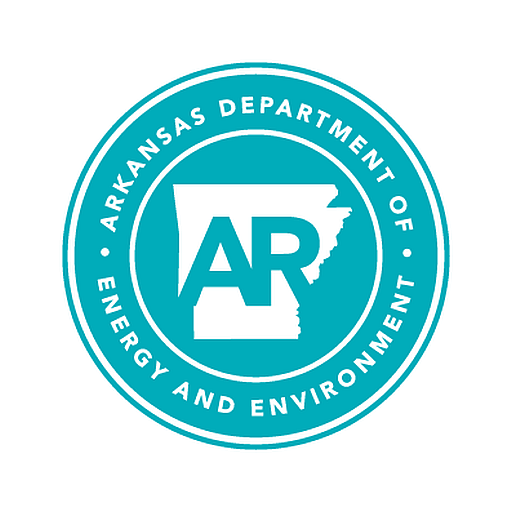

Agency overview
- Formed: 1949, reorganized 1971
- Preceding agencies: Arkansas Department of Environmental Quality (1971-2019); Arkansas Department of Pollution Control and Ecology
- Jurisdiction: State of Arkansas
- Headquarters: 5301 Northshore Drive; North Little Rock, Arkansas 72118-5317
- Employees: Approx. 400
- Annual budget: ▲$195,394,546
- Agency executive: Shane E. Khoury, Secretary
- Parent agency: Arkansas Pollution Control and Ecology Commission, Environmental Protection Agency (EPA)
- Website: www.adeq.state.ar.us/

The Arkansas Department of Energy and Environment is a cabinet level agency in the executive branch of Arkansas government responsible for implementation of the rules and regulations regarding the management of natural resources and protecting the environment of the state.

== Boards and Commissions ==
In Arkansas' shared services model of state government, the cabinet-level agencies assist boards and commissions who have an overlapping scope. ADEE supports:

Boards

- Liquified Petroleum Gas Board
- Marketing Board for Recyclables

Commissions

- Arkansas Geological Commission
- Arkansas Pollution Control and Ecology Commission
- Oil and Gas Commission
- Solid Waste Licensing Committee
- Wastewater Licensing Committee

Committees

- Petroleum Storage Tanks Advisory Committee

Panels

- Nutrient Water Quality Trading Advisory Panel
- Compliance Advisory Panel

Of these entities, three have regulatory powers: the Arkansas Pollution Control and Ecology Commission, Liquified Petroleum Gas Board, and Oil and Gas Commission. Various divisions and offices are tasked with enforcing the regulations drafted by these bodies. The remainder are advisory and make recommendations to the legislature or governor.

== Divisions ==
=== Environmental Quality ===
The Division of Environmental Quality (ADEQ or commonly DEQ within the state) is responsible for protecting human health and for safeguarding the natural environment: air, water, and land. DEQ is responsible for permitting and ensuring compliance with the regulations of the Arkansas Pollution Control and Ecology Commission, which makes environmental policy in Arkansas.

It is governed by the thirteen member Arkansas Pollution Control and Ecology Commission, with six members representing various state agencies and seven appointed by the Governor.

=== Regulatory Offices ===
- Air Quality
- Energy
- Land Resources
- Surface Mining & Reclamation Program
- Water

=== Support Offices ===
- Secretary's Office
- Public Outreach & Assistance

== See also ==
- List of Arkansas state agencies
