= Arkansas Department of Public Safety =

Department of the state government

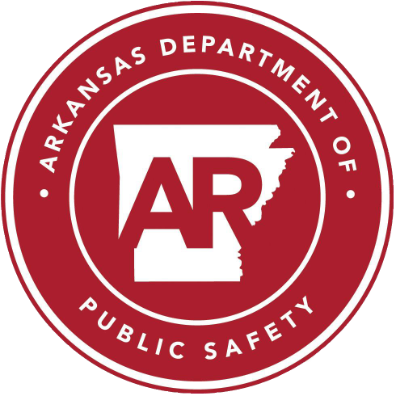
- Seal

- Flag of Arkansas
- Common name: Arkansas Department of Public Safety
- Abbreviation: ADPS
- Motto: "Protecting Arkansas Citizens"

Agency overview
- Formed: April 11, 2019

Jurisdictional structure
- Operations jurisdiction: Arkansas, USA
- Area: 53,179 square miles
- Population: 3,017,804 (2019)
- General nature: Civilian police

Operational structure
- Headquarters: One State Police Plaza Drive, Little Rock, Arkansas
- Agency executives: Mike Hagar, Cabinet secretary; Joan Shipley, Chief of staff; Karen Perry, Chief financial officer; Cindy Murphy, DPS Communications Director; Phillip Warriner, DPS HR Administrator

Website
- https://www.dps.arkansas.gov

The Department of Public Safety is a cabinet level agency in the executive branch of Arkansas state government responsible for state law enforcement, emergency management, crime information, crime support, and fire safety. It was created in 2019. The Department of Public Safety is headquartered at One State Police Plaza Drive in Little Rock, Arkansas.

== History ==
The Arkansas Transformation and Efficiencies Act of 2019 is considered a signature piece of legislation under Governor Asa Hutchinson . Prior to the Act 910 of 2019, the State of Arkansas had 42 cabinet-level agencies reporting directly to the Governor of Arkansas. Act 910 of 2019 reduced the number of cabinet-level agencies to 15, including the Department of Public Safety. This change is considered the largest reorganization in Arkansas State Government in the past 50 years.

The Secretary of the Arkansas Department of Public Safety is the executive head of the department, appointed by the Governor, is subject to confirmation by the Arkansas Senate, and serves at the pleasure of the Governor.

Each board and division of the Arkansas Department of Public Safety is under the direction, control, and supervision of the Secretary of the Department. Though, the Secretary of the Department can delegate functions, powers, and duties to the boards and divisions under the Arkansas Department of Public Safety.

== Boards and Divisions ==
The Arkansas Department of Public Safety is divided into boards and divisions:

Law enforcement

- Arkansas Commission on Law Enforcement Standards and Training
- Arkansas State Police Division

Office of emergency management

- Arkansas Division of Emergency Management

Crime information and support

- Arkansas Crime Information Center
- Arkansas State Crime Laboratory
- Crime Victims Reparations Board

Fire safety

- Fire Services
- Fire Prevention Commission
