= Arkansas Department of Human Services =

Government agency in Arkansas, United States

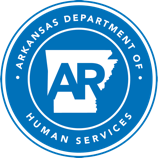

Agency overview
- Formed: 1971, Reorganized 1985, 2005, 2007, 2019
- Preceding agencies: Department of Social and Rehabilitation Services (1971-1985); Arkansas Department of Health and Human Services (2005-2007)
- Jurisdiction: State of Arkansas
- Headquarters: Donaghey Plaza South 700 Main Street Little Rock, Arkansas
- Employees: ▲6,596
- Annual budget: ▲$10,519,189,646
- Agency executive: Kristi Putnam, Secretary
- Website: https://humanservices.arkansas.gov/

The Arkansas Department of Human Services (DHS) is a state agency of Arkansas, headquartered in Donaghey Plaza South of the Donaghey Complex, a five-story building on the southwest corner of Main Street and 7th Street, in Little Rock.

The DHS is a cabinet level agency in the executive branch of government responsible maintaining social services for Arkansas by providing assistance to families and monitoring/inspecting health facilities.

== Boards and Commissions ==
In Arkansas's shared services model of state government, the cabinet-level agencies assist boards and commissions who have an overlapping scope. DHS supports:

Boards

- State Institutional System Board
- Early Head Start Governance Board
- Child Welfare Agency Review Board (Placement and Residential Licensing)
- Act 1434 Board (“Name Removal Board” or “Child Maltreatment Central Registry Review Team”)
- Board of Developmental Disabilities Services
- Drug Utilization Review Board
- Retrospective Drug Utilization Review Board
- Arkansas Coalition for Juvenile Justice Board
- Youth Justice Reform Board

Commissions

- Arkansas Early Childhood Commission
- Commission on Children, Youth, and Families

Community Action Agencies

- Arkansas River Valley Area Council
- Black River Area Development Corp
- Central Arkansas Development Council
- Community Action Program for Central Arkansas
- Crowley's Ridge Development Council
- Crawford-Sebastian Community Development Council
- Community Services Office
- Economic Opportunity Agency of Washington County
- Mississippi County, AR Economic Opportunity Agency
- Mid-Delta Community Services
- Northcentral Arkansas Development Council
- Office of Human Concern
- Ozark Opportunities
- Pine Bluff Jefferson County Economic Opportunity Agency - Central Delta Community Action Agency
- Southeast Arkansas Community Action Corp

Councils

- Arkansas Alcohol and Drug Abuse Coordinating Council
- Arkansas Behavioral Health Planning and Advisory Council
- Arkansas Governor's Council on Developmental Disabilities
- Arkansas State Hospital Advisory Council
- Governor's Advisory Council on Aging
- Interagency Council (ICC) for First Connections/State Interagency Council
- Parent Advisory Council

Committees

- Child Death and Near Fatality Multidisciplinary Review Committee
- Human Development Center Mortality Review Committee
- Drug Cost Committee
- Drug Review Committee
- Patient-Centered Medical Home Committee
- Rate Appeal and Cost Settlement Committee
- Security Advisory Committee

Other

- Arkansas Community Action Agencies Association
- Arkansas Lifespan Respite Coalition
- Arkansas State Epidemiological Outcomes Workgroup
- Autism Legislative Task Force
- Child Care Appeal Review Panel
- Citizens Review Panel
- Governor's Employment First Task Force
- Strategic Advisory Group

== Division Of Aging, Adult, & Behavioral Health Services ==
The Division Of Aging, Adult, & Behavioral Health Services (DAABHS) serves Arkansans needing behavioral health services (mental health and substance abuse) and those aging in place or with physical disabilities needing services to remain in their homes.

DAABHS is subdivided into five sections:

- Drug Prevention and Treatment
- Aging and Adult Services
- Behavioral Health Services
- Forensics
- Beneficiary Support

== Division Of Children & Family Services ==
The Division of Children & Family Services (DCFS) serves Arkansas child and families through adoption programs, child abuse prevention, child protection, family reunification, and foster care. DCFS has over 1,000 employees spread over all 75 Arkansas counties.

== Division Of Medical Services ==
The Division of Medical Services manages Arkansas's Medicaid program, ARKids First, and Arkansas Works.

== Division of Provider Services & Quality Assurance ==
The Division of Provider Services & Quality Assurance (DPSQA) oversees inspection, certification, and licensing of care facilities including nursing homes, mental health clinics, developmentally disabled offices and home health-care companies.

DPSQA is subdivided into three units:

- Office of Long-term Care
- Office of Community Services
- Performance & Engagement

== Division of Youth Services ==
The Division of Youth Services (DYS) provides services to families and children.

DYS operates correctional facilities for juveniles. The Arkansas Juvenile Assessment & Treatment Center (AJATC), located in Bryant in Saline County, near Alexander, is the primary intake and assessment center for juveniles. Originally established as the Girls Industrial School by Act 199 in 1905, the center houses boys and girls. In the late 1970s the center began to house boys, and the center received a fence in 1998. In 2007 Act 855 renamed the facility to its current name. The Dermott Juvenile Correctional Facility, located in Dermott in Chicot County, houses up to 32 men of the ages 18–21. There is also the Colt Juvenile Treatment Center in St. Francis County, Harrisburg Juvenile Treatment Center in Poinsett County, and the Mansfield Juvenile Treatment Center and Mansfield Juvenile Treatment Center for Girls on a 236-acre (96 ha) property near the Poteau Mountains in Sugarloaf Township, Sebastian County.

Previous facilities of the State of Arkansas that housed juveniles include the Negro Boys Industrial School in Wrightsville, the Arkansas Boys Industrial School near Pine Bluff, and state industrial schools for white girls and black girls. On January 9, 1957, Orvel M. Johnson, the state legislative auditor, recommended consolidating the white and black girls' schools together and locating the new institution, which would still be racially segregated, on the site of the then-current boys school.

== See also ==
- Howard v. Arkansas
- Arkansas Department of Human Services v. Ahlborn
- Arkansas Department of Human Services v. Cole
- Arkansas Department of Correction (operates adult correctional facilities)
