= Governor of Arkansas =

Head of government of Arkansas

- Great Seal of Arkansas

- Flag of Arkansas

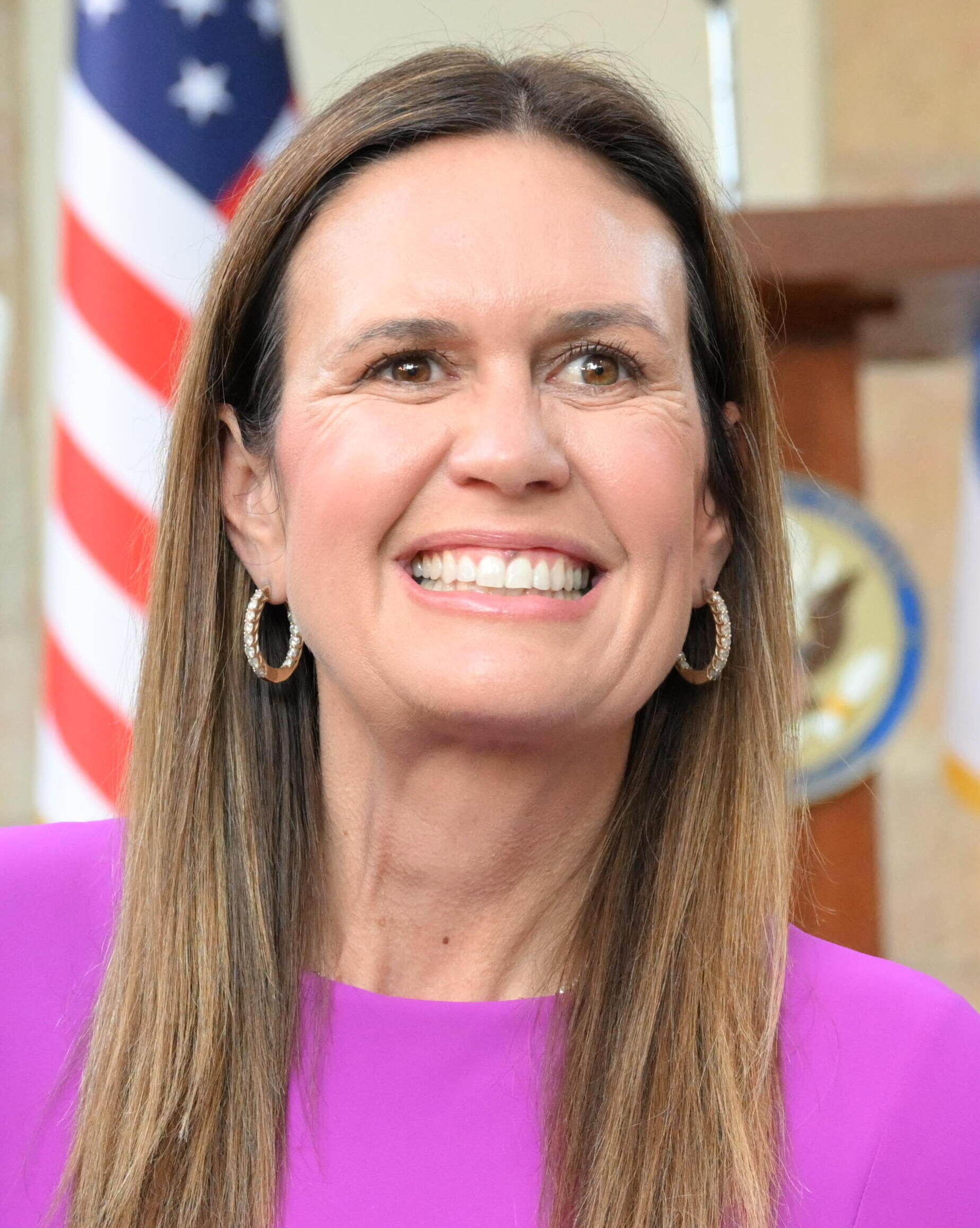
- Incumbent; Sarah Huckabee Sanders since January 10, 2023
- Government of Arkansas
- Style: Governor (informal); The Honorable (formal)
- Type: Chief executive; Head of government; Commander-in-chief
- Residence: Arkansas Governor's Mansion
- Seat: State Capitol, Little Rock, Arkansas
- Term length: Four years, renewable once
- Constituting instrument: Constitution of Arkansas
- Precursor: Governor of Arkansas Territory
- Inaugural holder: James Sevier Conway
- Formation: September 13, 1836 (190 years ago)
- Succession: Line of succession
- Deputy: Lieutenant Governor of Arkansas
- Salary: $158,739 (2022)
- Website: governor.arkansas.gov

The governor of Arkansas is the head of government of the U.S. state of Arkansas. The governor is the head of the executive branch of the Arkansas government and is charged with enforcing state laws.

The current governor of Arkansas is Republican Sarah Huckabee Sanders, who was sworn in on January 10, 2023.

== History ==
From 1819 to 1836 Arkansas was organized as a federal territory. It was administered by territorial governors appointed by the president of the United States to three year-terms. The governors were chiefly responsible for leading the territorial militia and managing relations with Native Americans. James Miller was appointed the first territorial governor on March 3, 1819.

The first state constitution, ratified in 1836, established four-year terms for governors and the requirement that they be at least 30 years of age and residents of the state for ten years. The fifth constitution in 1874, following the American Civil War and Reconstruction, limited the executive's power while increasing the legislative's, lowering gubernatorial terms to two years and changed the residency requirement to seven years. Amendment 63 to the Arkansas Constitution, passed in 1984, increased the terms of both governor and lieutenant governor to four years. A referendum in 1992 limited a governor to two consecutive four-year terms.

== Election and qualifications ==
To serve as governor, one must be at least 30 years old, a citizen of the United States, and have been a resident of the state for seven years prior to election. Governors may serve no more than two terms.

== Powers and duties ==
The constitution designates the governor the commander-in-chief of the state militia. The office-holder retains their powers as governor when traveling out of the state. The governor is responsible for appointing the 15 secretaries that lead the Arkansas Cabinet departments.

The governor signs bills passed by the General Assembly of which they approve into law and are empowered to veto bills of which they disapprove. Bills which they neither veto nor sign become law. They have five days to consider a piece of legislation for veto during an active legislative session and 20 days to consider a bill passed during the last five days of a session. They also have line-item veto power over appropriations bills. Vetoes can be overturned by a simple majority vote of the General Assembly. The governor may call the General Assembly into special session to consider matters of their choosing.

== List of governors ==
- List of governors of Arkansas

== Works cited ==
- Blair, Diane D.; Barth, Jay (2005). Arkansas Politics and Government (second ed.). Lincoln: University of Nebraska Press. ISBN 0-8032-6198-5.
- Goss, Kay Collett (2011). The Arkansas State Constitution. Oxford University Press. ISBN 9780199778966.
