= 1940 United States presidential election in Arkansas =

- November 5, 1940

Nominee	Franklin D. Roosevelt	Wendell Willkie
Party	Democratic	Republican
Home state	New York	New York
Running mate	Henry A. Wallace	Charles L. McNary
Electoral vote	9	0
Popular vote	157,213	42,122
Percentage	78.44%	21.02%
County results
Roosevelt
50–60%
60–70%
70–80%
80–90%
90–100%
Willkie
50–60%
President before election
Franklin D. Roosevelt
Democratic
Elected President
Franklin D. Roosevelt
Democratic

The 1940 United States presidential election in Arkansas took place on November 5, 1940, as part of the 1940 United States presidential election. State voters chose nine representatives, or electors, to the Electoral College, who voted for president and vice president.

Except for the Unionist Ozark counties of Newton and Searcy where Republicans controlled local government, Arkansas since the end of Reconstruction had been a classic one-party Democratic “Solid South” state. Disfranchisement of effectively all African Americans and most poor whites by a poll tax since 1890 meant that outside those two aberrant counties, the Republican Party was completely moribund and Democratic primaries the only competitive elections.

Increased voting by poor Ozark whites as a protest against Woodrow Wilson's internationalist foreign policy meant that Warren G. Harding in 1920 was able to win almost forty percent of the statewide vote; and 1928 saw the rest of the Outer South and North Alabama bolt the anti-Prohibition Catholic Al Smith. However, the presence of Arkansas Senator Joseph Taylor Robinson as running mate meant that within Arkansas only the most northwesterly counties with ordinarily substantial Republican votes suffered the same fate.

The following years saw Arkansas plunge into the Great Depression, followed almost immediately by a major drought from the summer of 1930 until the winter of 1931 and 1932. Like in the rest of the "Solid South", Arkansas gave overwhelming support to Democrat Franklin D. Roosevelt in 1932, with Roosevelt carrying every county in the state. His popularity would lessen somewhat during his second term due to the urban and labor bias of the New Deal, but Roosevelt remained in no danger in 1940. This was especially true given that Arkansas had never experienced German or Scandinavian immigration and thus strongly sympathized – as FDR did – with Britain in World War II. Thus FDR was able to almost maintain his 1936 majority in Arkansas, and replicated the county map of 1896, 1916, 1924 and 1936. As of 2020, this remains the last time that a presidential nominee has won more than seventy percent of the vote in Arkansas.

== Results ==
Electoral results
Presidential candidate	Party	Home state	Popular vote		Electoral vote	Running mate		
Presidential candidate	Party	Home state	Count	Percentage	Electoral vote	Vice-presidential candidate	Home state	Electoral vote
Franklin D. Roosevelt	Democratic	New York	157,213	78.44%	9	Henry Agard Wallace	Iowa	9
Wendell Willkie	Republican	New York	42,122	21.02%	0	Charles L. McNary	Oregon	0
—	Write-ins	—	1,094	0.55%	0	—	—	0
Total			200,429	100%	9			9
Needed to win					266			266

=== Results by county ===
1940 United States presidential election in Arkansas by county
County	Franklin Delano Roosevelt Democratic		Wendell Lewis Willkie Republican		Various candidates Write-ins		Margin		Total votes cast
County	#	%	#	%	#	%	#	%	Total votes cast
Arkansas	2,345	74.87%	742	23.69%	45	1.44%	1,603	51.18%	3,132
Ashley	1,835	90.71%	184	9.10%	4	0.20%	1,651	81.61%	2,023
Baxter	859	63.39%	489	36.09%	7	0.52%	370	27.31%	1,355
Benton	2,442	54.59%	1,962	43.86%	69	1.54%	480	10.73%	4,473
Boone	2,054	71.59%	786	27.40%	29	1.01%	1,268	44.20%	2,869
Bradley	1,939	93.85%	123	5.95%	4	0.19%	1,816	87.90%	2,066
Calhoun	818	94.90%	44	5.10%	0	0.00%	774	89.79%	862
Carroll	1,604	59.69%	1,081	40.23%	2	0.07%	523	19.46%	2,687
Chicot	1,592	90.71%	161	9.17%	2	0.11%	1,431	81.54%	1,755
Clark	2,008	86.29%	311	13.36%	8	0.34%	1,697	72.93%	2,327
Clay	1,676	60.31%	1,029	37.03%	74	2.66%	647	23.28%	2,779
Cleburne	834	68.47%	374	30.71%	10	0.82%	460	37.77%	1,218
Cleveland	989	94.37%	58	5.53%	1	0.10%	931	88.84%	1,048
Columbia	2,270	93.72%	149	6.15%	3	0.12%	2,121	87.57%	2,422
Conway	2,067	88.33%	272	11.62%	1	0.04%	1,795	76.71%	2,340
Craighead	3,300	77.43%	935	21.94%	27	0.63%	2,365	55.49%	4,262
Crawford	1,581	68.21%	691	29.81%	46	1.98%	890	38.40%	2,318
Crittenden	1,966	96.37%	72	3.53%	2	0.10%	1,894	92.84%	2,040
Cross	1,746	85.80%	285	14.00%	4	0.20%	1,461	71.79%	2,035
Dallas	1,295	88.28%	118	8.04%	54	3.68%	1,177	80.23%	1,467
Desha	1,370	89.78%	146	9.57%	10	0.66%	1,224	80.21%	1,526
Drew	1,329	87.95%	152	10.06%	30	1.99%	1,177	77.90%	1,511
Faulkner	2,535	82.68%	519	16.93%	12	0.39%	2,016	65.75%	3,066
Franklin	1,601	83.30%	319	16.60%	2	0.10%	1,282	66.70%	1,922
Fulton	838	70.84%	333	28.15%	12	1.01%	505	42.69%	1,183
Garland	3,335	69.89%	1,424	29.84%	13	0.27%	1,911	40.05%	4,772
Grant	1,043	86.70%	160	13.30%	0	0.00%	883	73.40%	1,203
Greene	2,220	81.17%	510	18.65%	5	0.18%	1,710	62.52%	2,735
Hempstead	2,814	87.15%	415	12.85%	0	0.00%	2,399	74.30%	3,229
Hot Spring	1,730	78.03%	482	21.74%	5	0.23%	1,248	56.29%	2,217
Howard	1,540	78.05%	419	21.24%	14	0.71%	1,121	56.82%	1,973
Independence	2,276	70.68%	928	28.82%	16	0.50%	1,348	41.86%	3,220
Izard	1,058	74.19%	366	25.67%	2	0.14%	692	48.53%	1,426
Jackson	2,223	84.59%	382	14.54%	23	0.88%	1,841	70.05%	2,628
Jefferson	3,829	86.45%	587	13.25%	13	0.29%	3,242	73.20%	4,429
Johnson	1,429	81.38%	318	18.11%	9	0.51%	1,111	63.27%	1,756
Lafayette	1,352	88.02%	159	10.35%	25	1.63%	1,193	77.67%	1,536
Lawrence	2,484	73.93%	852	25.36%	24	0.71%	1,632	48.57%	3,360
Lee	1,100	90.76%	109	8.99%	3	0.25%	991	81.77%	1,212
Lincoln	916	89.37%	99	9.66%	10	0.98%	817	79.71%	1,025
Little River	1,104	79.31%	276	19.83%	12	0.86%	828	59.48%	1,392
Logan	2,831	72.66%	1,065	27.34%	0	0.00%	1,766	45.33%	3,896
Lonoke	1,899	85.35%	323	14.52%	3	0.13%	1,576	70.83%	2,225
Madison	2,196	50.97%	2,107	48.91%	5	0.12%	89	2.07%	4,308
Marion	864	71.94%	320	26.64%	17	1.42%	544	45.30%	1,201
Miller	3,019	83.88%	563	15.64%	17	0.47%	2,456	68.24%	3,599
Mississippi	5,257	89.24%	616	10.46%	18	0.31%	4,641	78.78%	5,891
Monroe	1,494	92.00%	128	7.88%	2	0.12%	1,366	84.11%	1,624
Montgomery	1,012	71.42%	400	28.23%	5	0.35%	612	43.19%	1,417
Nevada	1,399	85.83%	224	13.74%	7	0.43%	1,175	72.09%	1,630
Newton	1,202	45.91%	1,392	53.17%	24	0.92%	-190	-7.26%	2,618
Ouachita	2,951	91.08%	284	8.77%	5	0.15%	2,667	82.31%	3,240
Perry	783	79.09%	206	20.81%	1	0.10%	577	58.28%	990
Phillips	2,235	90.12%	245	9.88%	0	0.00%	1,990	80.24%	2,480
Pike	974	69.13%	424	30.09%	11	0.78%	550	39.03%	1,409
Poinsett	4,138	85.90%	670	13.91%	9	0.19%	3,468	72.00%	4,817
Polk	1,255	67.55%	585	31.49%	18	0.97%	670	36.06%	1,858
Pope	3,765	82.55%	770	16.88%	26	0.57%	2,995	65.67%	4,561
Prairie	1,069	75.92%	336	23.86%	3	0.21%	733	52.06%	1,408
Pulaski	14,219	82.52%	2,955	17.15%	56	0.33%	11,264	65.37%	17,230
Randolph	1,687	77.42%	474	21.75%	18	0.83%	1,213	55.67%	2,179
St. Francis	1,671	88.23%	192	10.14%	31	1.64%	1,479	78.09%	1,894
Saline	1,963	87.21%	274	12.17%	14	0.62%	1,689	75.03%	2,251
Scott	992	73.32%	353	26.09%	8	0.59%	639	47.23%	1,353
Searcy	982	43.11%	1,292	56.72%	4	0.18%	-310	-13.61%	2,278
Sebastian	5,249	72.44%	1,968	27.16%	29	0.40%	3,281	45.28%	7,246
Sevier	1,374	82.03%	293	17.49%	8	0.48%	1,081	64.54%	1,675
Sharp	1,099	71.50%	433	28.17%	5	0.33%	666	43.33%	1,537
Stone	644	60.93%	406	38.41%	7	0.66%	238	22.52%	1,057
Union	4,842	90.59%	489	9.15%	14	0.26%	4,353	81.44%	5,345
Van Buren	1,068	72.65%	402	27.35%	0	0.00%	666	45.31%	1,470
Washington	2,873	60.48%	1,819	38.29%	58	1.22%	1,054	22.19%	4,750
White	3,345	78.80%	876	20.64%	24	0.57%	2,469	58.16%	4,245
Woodruff	1,280	86.43%	193	13.03%	8	0.54%	1,087	73.40%	1,481
Yell	2,236	90.64%	224	9.08%	7	0.28%	2,012	81.56%	2,467
Totals	157,213	78.44%	42,122	21.02%	1,094	0.55%	115,091	57.42%	200,429

== See also ==
- United States presidential elections in Arkansas
