= 1936 United States presidential election in Arkansas =

- November 3, 1936

All nine Arkansas votes to the Electoral College

Nominee	Franklin D. Roosevelt	Alf Landon
Party	Democratic	Republican
Home state	New York	Kansas
Running mate	John Nance Garner	Frank Knox
Electoral vote	9	0
Popular vote	146,765	32,039
Percentage	81.80%	17.86%
County results
Roosevelt
50–60%
60–70%
70–80%
80–90%
90–100%
Landon
50–60%
President before election
Franklin D. Roosevelt
Democratic
Elected President
Franklin D. Roosevelt
Democratic

The 1936 United States presidential election in Arkansas took place on November 3, 1936, as part of the 1936 United States presidential election. State voters chose nine representatives, or electors, to the Electoral College, who voted for president and vice president.

Incumbent Democratic President Franklin D. Roosevelt of New York (running with Vice President John Nance Garner of Texas) carried Arkansas in a landslide, taking 81.8% of the state's vote to Republican Alf Landon's 17.86%. Even amidst a national Democratic landslide – in which Roosevelt carried every state except Vermont and Maine and earned more than 60% of the national popular vote – Arkansas weighed in as nearly 40% more Democratic than the nation at-large.

This was typical of the time; with the exception of the Unionist Ozark counties of Newton and Searcy where Republicans controlled local government, Arkansas since the end of Reconstruction had been a classic one-party Democratic “Solid South” state. Disfranchisement of effectively all Negroes and most poor whites had meant that outside those two aberrant counties, the Republican Party was completely moribund and Democratic primaries the only competitive elections.

The 1920s did see a minor change in this, as increased voting by poor Ozark whites as a protest against Woodrow Wilson's internationalist foreign policy meant that Warren G. Harding was able to win almost forty percent of the statewide vote in 1920; however despite his national landslide Calvin Coolidge in 1924 could not do any more than win the two traditional Unionist GOP counties. 1928 saw the rest of the Outer South and North Alabama bolt the anti-Prohibition Catholic Al Smith, but the presence of Arkansas Senator Joseph Taylor Robinson as running mate meant that within Arkansas only the most northwesterly counties with ordinarily substantial Republican votes would suffer the same fate.

The following years saw Arkansas plunge into the Great Depression, followed almost immediately by a major drought from the summer of 1930s until the winter of 1931/1932. This came on top of a long depression in agriculture, which was still the dominant player in Arkansas’ economy and was backed up by the “Great Migration” of the state's agricultural labor force to northeastern and midwestern cities. Arkansas gave extremely heavy support to Democrat Franklin Roosevelt in 1932, when he garnered more than 86% of ballots and swept every county in the state, becoming the first Democrat to win Searcy County since before the Civil War and only the second to win adjacent Newton County.

Throughout his first term as president, Roosevelt was extremely popular in the “Solid South” and despite embryonic concerns over loss of Southern control of the national party due to abolition of the “two-thirds” rule and some hostility to FDR's repeal of Prohibition he was overwhelmingly and in many places almost unanimously supported by Arkansas’ limited electorate. Ozark Republican Landon did regain the two Unionist and Prohibitionist Ozark counties, but topped 40% in only two of the remaining seventy-three. Nonetheless, the 1936 results in Arkansas were about 10% less Democratic than that of 1932, despite the nation as a whole shifting somewhat to the left. As of 2020, this remains the last time that a presidential candidate has won more than 80% of the vote in Arkansas.

== Results ==
Electoral results
Presidential candidate	Party	Home state	Popular vote		Electoral vote	Running mate		
Presidential candidate	Party	Home state	Count	Percentage	Electoral vote	Vice-presidential candidate	Home state	Electoral vote
Franklin D. Roosevelt	Democratic	New York	146,765	81.80%	9	John Nance Garner	Texas	9
Alf Landon	Republican	Kansas	32,039	17.86%	0	Frank Knox	Illinois	0
Norman Thomas	Socialist	New York	446	0.25%	0	George A. Nelson	Wisconsin	0
Earl Browder	Communist	Kansas	169	0.09%	0	James W. Ford	Alabama	0
William Lemke	Write-in	North Dakota	4	0.00%	0	Thomas C. O'Brien	Massachusetts	0
Total			179,423	100%	9			9
Needed to win					266			266

=== Results by county ===
1936 United States presidential election in Arkansas by county
County	Franklin Delano Roosevelt Democratic		Alfred Mossman Landon Republican		Various candidates Other parties		Margin		Total votes cast
County	#	%	#	%	#	%	#	%	Total votes cast
Arkansas	2,008	85.19%	341	14.47%	8	0.34%	1,667	70.73%	2,357
Ashley	1,382	93.57%	95	6.43%	0	0.00%	1,287	87.14%	1,477
Baxter	773	66.93%	375	32.47%	7	0.61%	398	34.46%	1,155
Benton	2,418	58.77%	1,672	40.64%	24	0.58%	746	18.13%	4,114
Boone	2,386	69.20%	1,052	30.51%	10	0.29%	1,334	38.69%	3,448
Bradley	1,571	95.97%	65	3.97%	1	0.06%	1,506	92.00%	1,637
Calhoun	704	95.78%	30	4.08%	1	0.14%	674	91.70%	735
Carroll	1,649	63.55%	940	36.22%	6	0.23%	709	27.32%	2,595
Chicot	1,145	93.78%	75	6.14%	1	0.08%	1,070	87.63%	1,221
Clark	1,962	90.71%	193	8.92%	8	0.37%	1,769	81.78%	2,163
Clay	1,778	68.94%	795	30.83%	6	0.23%	983	38.12%	2,579
Cleburne	927	72.93%	336	26.44%	8	0.63%	591	46.50%	1,271
Cleveland	1,088	95.77%	45	3.96%	3	0.26%	1,043	91.81%	1,136
Columbia	1,847	96.65%	64	3.35%	0	0.00%	1,783	93.30%	1,911
Conway	2,013	86.77%	305	13.15%	2	0.09%	1,708	73.62%	2,320
Craighead	3,335	82.02%	710	17.46%	21	0.52%	2,625	64.56%	4,066
Crawford	1,963	73.47%	697	26.09%	12	0.45%	1,266	47.38%	2,672
Crittenden	1,858	98.83%	22	1.17%	0	0.00%	1,836	97.66%	1,880
Cross	1,644	91.49%	133	7.40%	20	1.11%	1,511	84.08%	1,797
Dallas	1,433	93.29%	103	6.71%	0	0.00%	1,330	86.59%	1,536
Desha	1,411	96.12%	55	3.75%	2	0.14%	1,356	92.37%	1,468
Drew	1,229	94.47%	70	5.38%	2	0.15%	1,159	89.09%	1,301
Faulkner	2,521	82.82%	511	16.79%	12	0.39%	2,010	66.03%	3,044
Franklin	1,890	84.11%	345	15.35%	12	0.53%	1,545	68.76%	2,247
Fulton	946	68.25%	437	31.53%	3	0.22%	509	36.72%	1,386
Garland	2,931	70.07%	1,217	29.09%	35	0.84%	1,714	40.98%	4,183
Grant	978	86.86%	147	13.06%	1	0.09%	831	73.80%	1,126
Greene	1,811	81.25%	412	18.48%	6	0.27%	1,399	62.76%	2,229
Hempstead	2,431	92.68%	190	7.24%	2	0.08%	2,241	85.44%	2,623
Hot Spring	1,581	77.77%	444	21.84%	8	0.39%	1,137	55.93%	2,033
Howard	1,437	83.69%	275	16.02%	5	0.29%	1,162	67.68%	1,717
Independence	2,101	75.25%	685	24.53%	6	0.21%	1,416	50.72%	2,792
Izard	1,350	76.44%	416	23.56%	0	0.00%	934	52.89%	1,766
Jackson	2,151	86.77%	327	13.19%	1	0.04%	1,824	73.58%	2,479
Jefferson	3,414	93.66%	224	6.15%	7	0.19%	3,190	87.52%	3,645
Johnson	1,432	80.81%	318	17.95%	22	1.24%	1,114	62.87%	1,772
Lafayette	1,279	92.55%	100	7.24%	3	0.22%	1,179	85.31%	1,382
Lawrence	2,230	82.50%	457	16.91%	16	0.59%	1,773	65.59%	2,703
Lee	1,257	94.87%	66	4.98%	2	0.15%	1,191	89.89%	1,325
Lincoln	913	95.90%	39	4.10%	0	0.00%	874	91.81%	952
Little River	1,056	84.14%	192	15.30%	7	0.56%	864	68.84%	1,255
Logan	2,663	77.41%	770	22.38%	7	0.20%	1,893	55.03%	3,440
Lonoke	2,735	89.76%	310	10.17%	2	0.07%	2,425	79.59%	3,047
Madison	1,679	53.02%	1,484	46.86%	4	0.13%	195	6.16%	3,167
Marion	989	68.68%	435	30.21%	16	1.11%	554	38.47%	1,440
Miller	2,689	89.01%	323	10.69%	9	0.30%	2,366	78.32%	3,021
Mississippi	4,835	93.94%	303	5.89%	9	0.17%	4,532	88.05%	5,147
Monroe	1,102	92.84%	82	6.91%	3	0.25%	1,020	85.93%	1,187
Montgomery	1,034	68.07%	465	30.61%	20	1.32%	569	37.46%	1,519
Nevada	1,252	85.69%	204	13.96%	5	0.34%	1,048	71.73%	1,461
Newton	938	47.11%	1,053	52.89%	0	0.00%	-115	-5.78%	1,991
Ouachita	2,808	91.47%	262	8.53%	0	0.00%	2,546	82.93%	3,070
Perry	899	78.31%	249	21.69%	0	0.00%	650	56.62%	1,148
Phillips	2,259	95.60%	94	3.98%	10	0.42%	2,165	91.62%	2,363
Pike	994	77.78%	283	22.14%	1	0.08%	711	55.63%	1,278
Poinsett	3,457	85.38%	563	13.90%	29	0.72%	2,894	71.47%	4,049
Polk	1,170	67.44%	537	30.95%	28	1.61%	633	36.48%	1,735
Pope	2,678	88.38%	348	11.49%	4	0.13%	2,330	76.90%	3,030
Prairie	1,321	82.25%	282	17.56%	3	0.19%	1,039	64.69%	1,606
Pulaski	11,482	89.49%	1,320	10.29%	28	0.22%	10,162	79.20%	12,830
Randolph	1,693	80.24%	414	19.62%	3	0.14%	1,279	60.62%	2,110
St. Francis	1,938	94.72%	94	4.59%	14	0.68%	1,844	90.13%	2,046
Saline	1,520	79.87%	359	18.86%	24	1.26%	1,161	61.01%	1,903
Scott	1,137	75.70%	363	24.17%	2	0.13%	774	51.53%	1,502
Searcy	767	43.14%	1,010	56.81%	1	0.06%	-243	-13.67%	1,778
Sebastian	4,539	79.35%	1,161	20.30%	20	0.35%	3,378	59.06%	5,720
Sevier	1,200	80.00%	289	19.27%	11	0.73%	911	60.73%	1,500
Sharp	934	75.63%	289	23.40%	12	0.97%	645	52.23%	1,235
Stone	521	67.49%	248	32.12%	3	0.39%	273	35.36%	772
Union	4,141	93.94%	254	5.76%	13	0.29%	3,887	88.18%	4,408
Van Buren	1,422	72.22%	541	27.48%	6	0.30%	881	44.74%	1,969
Washington	3,378	67.87%	1,579	31.73%	20	0.40%	1,799	36.15%	4,977
White	2,503	82.20%	535	17.57%	7	0.23%	1,968	64.63%	3,045
Woodruff	1,473	84.70%	253	14.55%	13	0.75%	1,220	70.16%	1,739
Yell	2,382	88.22%	318	11.78%	0	0.00%	2,064	76.44%	2,700
Totals	146,765	81.79%	32,049	17.86%	617	0.34%	114,716	63.93%	179,431

==== Counties that flipped from Democratic to Republican ====
- Newton
- Searcy

== See also ==
- United States presidential elections in Arkansas
