= 1932 United States presidential election in Arkansas =

- November 8, 1932

Nominee	Franklin D. Roosevelt	Herbert Hoover
Party	Democratic	Republican
Home state	New York	California
Running mate	John Nance Garner	Charles Curtis
Electoral vote	9	0
Popular vote	189,529	27,465
Percentage	86.44%	12.53%
County results
Roosevelt
50–60%
60–70%
70–80%
80–90%
90–100%
President before election
Herbert Hoover
Republican
Elected President
Franklin D. Roosevelt
Democratic

The 1932 United States presidential election in Arkansas was held on November 8, 1932, as part of the concurrent 1932 United States presidential election held throughout all forty-eight contemporary states. State voters chose nine electors, or representatives to the Electoral College, who voted for President and Vice-president.

Except for the Unionist Ozark counties of Newton and Searcy where Republicans controlled local government, Arkansas since the end of Reconstruction had been a classic one-party Democratic “Solid South” state. Disfranchisement of effectively all African-Americans and most poor whites had meant that outside those two aberrant counties, the Republican Party was completely moribund and Democratic primaries the only competitive elections.

The 1920s did see a minor change in this, as increased voting by poor Ozark whites as a protest against Woodrow Wilson's internationalist foreign policy meant that Warren G. Harding was able to win almost forty percent of the statewide vote in 1920; however despite his national landslide Calvin Coolidge in 1924 could not do any more than win the two traditional Unionist GOP counties. 1928 saw the rest of the Outer South and North Alabama bolt the anti-Prohibition Catholic Al Smith, but the presence of Arkansas Senator Joseph Taylor Robinson as running mate meant that within Arkansas only the most northwesterly counties with ordinarily substantial Republican votes would suffer the same fate.

The following years saw Arkansas plunge into the Great Depression, followed almost immediately by a major drought from the summer of 1930s until the winter of 1931/1932. This came on top of a long depression in agriculture, which was still the dominant player in Arkansas’ economy and was backed up by the “Great Migration” of the state's agricultural labor force to northeastern and midwestern cities.

With the Depression not improving, Arkansas gave extremely heavy support to Democrat Franklin Roosevelt in the 1932 election. Roosevelt won every county in the state, becoming the first Democrat to win Searcy County since before the Civil War and only the second to win adjacent Newton County. As of 2020, this remains the only time in history that a Democratic presidential nominee has swept every county in Arkansas, and one of only two times (along with Richard Nixon's 1972 landslide) that a candidate of any party has done so.

== Results ==
Electoral results
Presidential candidate	Party	Home state	Popular vote		Electoral vote	Running mate		
Presidential candidate	Party	Home state	Count	Percentage	Electoral vote	Vice-presidential candidate	Home state	Electoral vote
Franklin D. Roosevelt	Democrat	New York	189,529	86.44%	9	John Nance Garner	Texas	9
Herbert Hoover (incumbent)	Republican	California	27,465	12.53%	0	Charles Curtis (incumbent)	Kansas	0
Norman Thomas	Socialist	New York	1,166	0.53%	0	James H. Maurer	Pennsylvania	0
William Hope Harvey	Liberty	Arkansas	952	0.43%	0	Frank Hemenway	Washington	0
William Z. Foster	Communist	Illinois	157	0.07%	0	James W. Ford	Alabama	0
Total			219,269	100%	9			9
Needed to win					266			266

=== Results by county ===
1932 United States presidential election in Arkansas by county (Note: These results differ from those in Dave Leip’s U.S. Election Atlas and used in the main 1932 United States presidential election article.)
County	Franklin Delano Roosevelt Democratic		Herbert Clark Hoover Republican		Norman Mattoon Thomas Socialist		William Hope Harvey Liberty		William Z. Foster Communist		Margin		Total votes cast
County	#	%	#	%	#	%	#	%	#	%	#	%	Total votes cast
Arkansas	2,867	84.45%	494	14.55%	19	0.56%	14	0.41%	1	0.03%	2,373	69.90%	3,395
Ashley	2,537	92.83%	188	6.88%	5	0.18%	3	0.11%	0	0.00%	2,349	85.95%	2,733
Baxter	1,039	82.85%	194	15.47%	13	1.04%	8	0.64%	0	0.00%	845	67.38%	1,254
Benton	3,775	72.62%	1,275	24.53%	34	0.65%	110	2.12%	4	0.08%	2,500	48.10%	5,198
Boone	2,644	78.11%	697	20.59%	12	0.35%	32	0.95%	0	0.00%	1,947	57.52%	3,385
Bradley	1,985	93.76%	125	5.90%	5	0.24%	1	0.05%	1	0.05%	1,860	87.86%	2,117
Calhoun	1,235	94.85%	59	4.53%	4	0.31%	4	0.31%	0	0.00%	1,176	90.32%	1,302
Carroll	2,150	73.10%	758	25.77%	5	0.17%	26	0.88%	2	0.07%	1,392	47.33%	2,941
Chicot	1,680	94.38%	98	5.51%	0	0.00%	1	0.06%	1	0.06%	1,582	88.88%	1,780
Clark	3,037	93.88%	183	5.66%	6	0.19%	9	0.28%	0	0.00%	2,854	88.22%	3,235
Clay	1,891	82.00%	397	17.22%	11	0.48%	5	0.22%	2	0.09%	1,494	64.79%	2,306
Cleburne	1,750	88.29%	204	10.29%	14	0.71%	12	0.61%	2	0.10%	1,546	78.00%	1,982
Cleveland	1,440	93.87%	92	6.00%	1	0.07%	1	0.07%	0	0.00%	1,348	87.87%	1,534
Columbia	2,420	96.22%	85	3.38%	5	0.20%	5	0.20%	0	0.00%	2,335	92.84%	2,515
Conway	2,530	89.24%	285	10.05%	9	0.32%	9	0.32%	2	0.07%	2,245	79.19%	2,835
Craighead	4,412	87.09%	606	11.96%	33	0.65%	12	0.24%	3	0.06%	3,806	75.13%	5,066
Crawford	2,962	77.46%	809	21.16%	31	0.81%	18	0.47%	4	0.10%	2,153	56.30%	3,824
Crittenden	2,411	98.25%	37	1.51%	5	0.20%	1	0.04%	0	0.00%	2,374	96.74%	2,454
Cross	2,066	95.47%	87	4.02%	6	0.28%	4	0.18%	1	0.05%	1,979	91.45%	2,164
Dallas	2,139	93.16%	150	6.53%	6	0.26%	1	0.04%	0	0.00%	1,989	86.63%	2,296
Desha	1,549	94.51%	81	4.94%	9	0.55%	0	0.00%	0	0.00%	1,468	89.57%	1,639
Drew	1,760	89.39%	198	10.06%	6	0.30%	5	0.25%	0	0.00%	1,562	79.33%	1,969
Faulkner	2,749	84.77%	437	13.48%	9	0.28%	45	1.39%	3	0.09%	2,312	71.29%	3,243
Franklin	1,896	84.83%	275	12.30%	47	2.10%	14	0.63%	3	0.13%	1,621	72.53%	2,235
Fulton	1,235	83.84%	237	16.09%	1	0.07%	0	0.00%	0	0.00%	998	67.75%	1,473
Garland	4,252	83.60%	833	16.38%	1	0.02%	0	0.00%	0	0.00%	3,419	67.22%	5,086
Grant	1,626	96.50%	55	3.26%	1	0.06%	2	0.12%	1	0.06%	1,571	93.23%	1,685
Greene	3,277	91.43%	274	7.65%	28	0.78%	2	0.06%	3	0.08%	3,003	83.79%	3,584
Hempstead	2,840	89.90%	317	10.03%	2	0.06%	0	0.00%	0	0.00%	2,523	79.87%	3,159
Hot Spring	2,542	90.59%	237	8.45%	14	0.50%	10	0.36%	3	0.11%	2,305	82.15%	2,806
Howard	1,703	91.02%	165	8.82%	3	0.16%	0	0.00%	0	0.00%	1,538	82.20%	1,871
Independence	2,427	86.34%	371	13.20%	3	0.11%	10	0.36%	0	0.00%	2,056	73.14%	2,811
Izard	1,227	85.27%	200	13.90%	8	0.56%	3	0.21%	1	0.07%	1,027	71.37%	1,439
Jackson	2,521	92.58%	193	7.09%	5	0.18%	2	0.07%	2	0.07%	2,328	85.49%	2,723
Jefferson	5,248	92.23%	419	7.36%	13	0.23%	8	0.14%	2	0.04%	4,829	84.87%	5,690
Johnson	1,557	81.60%	284	14.88%	42	2.20%	22	1.15%	3	0.16%	1,273	66.72%	1,908
Lafayette	1,495	90.50%	151	9.14%	3	0.18%	3	0.18%	0	0.00%	1,344	81.36%	1,652
Lawrence	3,056	89.54%	293	8.58%	28	0.82%	35	1.03%	1	0.03%	2,763	80.96%	3,413
Lee	1,635	97.44%	39	2.32%	1	0.06%	3	0.18%	0	0.00%	1,596	95.11%	1,678
Lincoln	1,301	96.30%	49	3.63%	1	0.07%	0	0.00%	0	0.00%	1,252	92.67%	1,351
Little River	1,399	91.80%	118	7.74%	4	0.26%	1	0.07%	2	0.13%	1,281	84.06%	1,524
Logan	2,493	78.54%	645	20.32%	23	0.72%	11	0.35%	2	0.06%	1,848	58.22%	3,174
Lonoke	2,951	94.04%	175	5.58%	7	0.22%	1	0.03%	4	0.13%	2,776	88.46%	3,138
Madison	2,803	55.01%	2,197	43.12%	39	0.77%	50	0.98%	6	0.12%	606	11.89%	5,095
Marion	1,282	80.18%	235	14.70%	40	2.50%	29	1.81%	13	0.81%	1,047	65.48%	1,599
Miller	3,876	91.57%	322	7.61%	20	0.47%	11	0.26%	4	0.09%	3,554	83.96%	4,233
Mississippi	5,776	93.12%	364	5.87%	46	0.74%	12	0.19%	5	0.08%	5,412	87.25%	6,203
Monroe	1,753	90.59%	170	8.79%	9	0.47%	0	0.00%	3	0.16%	1,583	81.81%	1,935
Montgomery	1,495	85.97%	211	12.13%	12	0.69%	21	1.21%	0	0.00%	1,284	73.84%	1,739
Nevada	2,358	91.97%	197	7.68%	4	0.16%	1	0.04%	4	0.16%	2,161	84.28%	2,564
Newton	941	62.32%	540	35.76%	26	1.72%	3	0.20%	0	0.00%	401	26.56%	1,510
Ouachita	3,118	87.66%	432	12.15%	3	0.08%	3	0.08%	1	0.03%	2,686	75.51%	3,557
Perry	1,347	91.38%	123	8.34%	3	0.20%	0	0.00%	1	0.07%	1,224	83.04%	1,474
Phillips	2,976	94.66%	142	4.52%	0	0.00%	26	0.83%	0	0.00%	2,834	90.14%	3,144
Pike	1,480	89.21%	176	10.61%	1	0.06%	2	0.12%	0	0.00%	1,304	78.60%	1,659
Poinsett	4,312	93.01%	252	5.44%	48	1.04%	6	0.13%	18	0.39%	4,060	87.58%	4,636
Polk	1,568	83.67%	223	11.90%	29	1.55%	54	2.88%	0	0.00%	1,345	71.77%	1,874
Pope	2,391	88.49%	280	10.36%	11	0.41%	18	0.67%	2	0.07%	2,111	78.13%	2,702
Prairie	1,743	91.21%	158	8.27%	5	0.26%	4	0.21%	1	0.05%	1,585	82.94%	1,911
Pulaski	14,049	85.46%	2,281	13.87%	71	0.43%	29	0.18%	10	0.06%	11,768	71.58%	16,440
Randolph	2,021	90.10%	206	9.18%	2	0.09%	12	0.53%	2	0.09%	1,815	80.92%	2,243
St. Francis	2,191	92.56%	130	5.49%	33	1.39%	12	0.51%	1	0.04%	2,061	87.07%	2,367
Saline	1,990	93.47%	107	5.03%	18	0.85%	9	0.42%	5	0.23%	1,883	88.45%	2,129
Scott	1,042	79.42%	174	13.26%	27	2.06%	65	4.95%	4	0.30%	868	66.16%	1,312
Searcy	947	52.38%	846	46.79%	11	0.61%	3	0.17%	1	0.06%	101	5.59%	1,808
Sebastian	4,937	78.87%	1,268	20.26%	24	0.38%	25	0.40%	6	0.10%	3,669	58.61%	6,260
Sevier	2,009	91.61%	162	7.39%	10	0.46%	12	0.55%	0	0.00%	1,847	84.22%	2,193
Sharp	1,334	89.89%	142	9.57%	8	0.54%	0	0.00%	0	0.00%	1,192	80.32%	1,484
Stone	1,100	79.14%	261	18.78%	8	0.58%	20	1.44%	1	0.07%	839	60.36%	1,390
Union	5,429	94.61%	245	4.27%	53	0.92%	10	0.17%	1	0.02%	5,184	90.35%	5,738
Van Buren	1,456	77.04%	413	21.85%	14	0.74%	6	0.32%	1	0.05%	1,043	55.19%	1,890
Washington	4,971	75.36%	1,502	22.77%	64	0.97%	48	0.73%	11	0.17%	3,469	52.59%	6,596
White	3,251	87.75%	430	11.61%	19	0.51%	4	0.11%	1	0.03%	2,821	76.14%	3,705
Woodruff	1,864	92.19%	135	6.68%	18	0.89%	3	0.15%	2	0.10%	1,729	85.51%	2,022
Yell	2,010	87.77%	272	11.88%	7	0.31%	1	0.04%	0	0.00%	1,738	75.90%	2,290
Totals	189,529	86.44%	27,465	12.53%	1,166	0.53%	952	0.43%	157	0.07%	162,064	73.91%	219,269

==== Counties that flipped from Republican to Democratic ====
- Carroll
- Hot Spring
- Madison
- Montgomery
- Polk
- Newton
- Searcy
- Sebastian
- Washington

== See also ==
- United States presidential elections in Arkansas
