= Scott County, Arkansas =

County in Arkansas, United States

- County
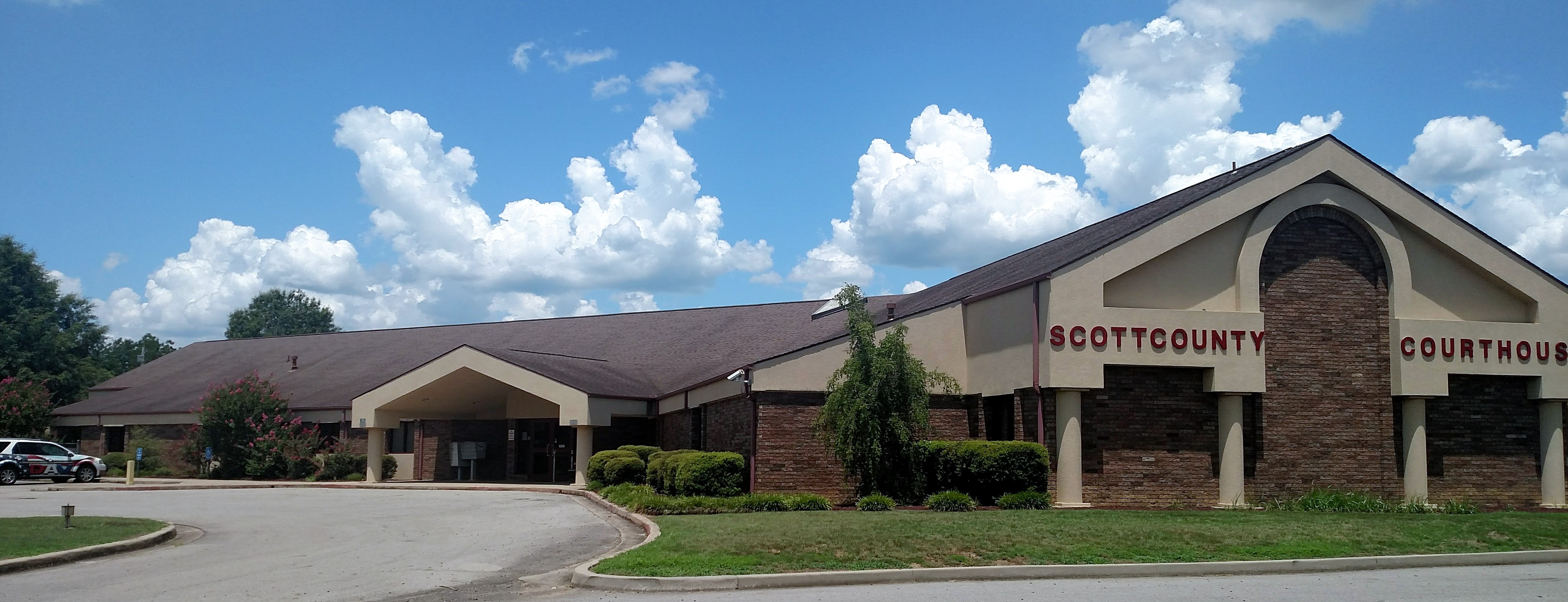
- Scott County Courthouse in Waldron

- Location within the U.S. state of Arkansas
- Coordinates: 34°52′49″N 94°04′15″W
- Country: United States
- State: Arkansas
- Founded: November 5, 1833
- Named for: Andrew Scott
- Seat: Waldron
- Largest city: Waldron

Area
  - Total: 898 sq mi (2,330 km^{2})
  - Land: 892 sq mi (2,310 km^{2})
  - Water: 5.8 sq mi (15 km^{2}) 0.6%

Population (2020)
  - Total: 9,836
  - Estimate (2025): 9,965 ▲
  - Density: 11.0/sq mi (4.26/km^{2})
- Time zone: UTC−6 (Central)
  - Summer (DST): UTC−5 (CDT)
- Congressional district: 4th

Scott County is a county located in the U.S. state of Arkansas. As of the 2020 census, the population was 9,836. The county seat is Waldron. Scott County is Arkansas' 28th county, formed on November 5, 1833, and named for Andrew Scott, a justice of the Supreme Court of the Arkansas Territory. It is an alcohol-prohibited or dry county.

== Geography ==
According to the U.S. Census Bureau, the county has a total area of 898 square miles (2,330 km^{2}), of which 892 square miles (2,310 km^{2}) is land and 5.8 square miles (15 km^{2}) (0.6%) is water.

=== Major highways ===
- Future Interstate 49
- U.S. Highway 71
- U.S. Highway 270
- Highway 23
- Highway 28
- Highway 80
- Highway 248
- Highway 250
- Highway 272
- Highway 378

=== Adjacent counties ===
- Sebastian County (northwest)
- Logan County (northeast)
- Yell County (east)
- Montgomery County (southeast)
- Polk County (south)
- Le Flore County, Oklahoma (west)

=== National protected area ===
- Ouachita National Forest (part)

== Demographics ==
Historical population
Census	Pop.	Note	%±
1840	1,694		—
1850	3,083		82.0%
1860	5,145		66.9%
1870	7,483		45.4%
1880	9,174		22.6%
1890	12,635		37.7%
1900	13,183		4.3%
1910	14,302		8.5%
1920	13,232		−7.5%
1930	11,803		−10.8%
1940	13,300		12.7%
1950	10,057		−24.4%
1960	7,297		−27.4%
1970	8,207		12.5%
1980	9,685		18.0%
1990	10,205		5.4%
2000	10,996		7.8%
2010	11,233		2.2%
2020	9,836		−12.4%
2025 (est.)	9,965	▲	1.3%
U.S. Decennial Census; 1790–1960 1900–1990; 1990–2000 2010

=== 2020 census ===
As of the 2020 census, the county had a population of 9,836. The median age was 42.0 years. 23.7% of residents were under the age of 18 and 20.1% of residents were 65 years of age or older. For every 100 females there were 101.1 males, and for every 100 females age 18 and over there were 101.0 males age 18 and over.

The racial makeup of the county was 83.5% White, 0.4% Black or African American, 2.1% American Indian and Alaska Native, 2.8% Asian, 0.1% Native Hawaiian and Pacific Islander, 3.6% from some other race, and 7.5% from two or more races. Hispanic or Latino residents of any race comprised 7.6% of the population.

Less than 0.1% of residents lived in urban areas, while 100.0% lived in rural areas.

There were 3,930 households in the county, of which 31.1% had children under the age of 18 living in them. Of all households, 50.6% were married-couple households, 19.4% were households with a male householder and no spouse or partner present, and 23.4% were households with a female householder and no spouse or partner present. About 27.3% of all households were made up of individuals and 12.7% had someone living alone who was 65 years of age or older.

There were 4,851 housing units, of which 19.0% were vacant. Among occupied housing units, 72.8% were owner-occupied and 27.2% were renter-occupied. The homeowner vacancy rate was 3.3% and the rental vacancy rate was 13.7%.

=== 2000 census ===
As of the 2000 census, there were 10,996 people, 4,323 households, and 3,121 families residing in the county. The population density was 12 people per square mile (4.6 people/km^{2}). There were 4,924 housing units at an average density of 6 units per square mile (2.3 units/km^{2}). The racial makeup of the county was 93.53% White, 0.23% Black or African American, 1.40% Native American, 0.95% Asian, 0.01% Pacific Islander, 2.56% from other races, and 1.32% from two or more races. 5.71% of the population were Hispanic or Latino of any race.

There were 4,323 households, out of which 32.6% had children under the age of 18 living with them, 59.5% were married couples living together, 8.5% had a female householder with no husband present, and 27.8% were non-families. 24.8% of all households were made up of individuals, and 11.4% had someone living alone who was 65 years of age or older. The average household size was 2.52 and the average family size was 2.98.

In the county, the population was spread out, with 26.5% under the age of 18, 8.1% from 18 to 24, 26.5% from 25 to 44, 24.2% from 45 to 64, and 14.7% who were 65 years of age or older. The median age was 37 years. For every 100 females there were 101.9 males. For every 100 females age 18 and over, there were 96.6 males.

The median income for a household in the county was $26,412, and the median income for a family was $30,311. Males had a median income of $23,118 versus $17,127 for females. The per capita income for the county was $13,609. About 15.3% of families and 18.2% of the population were below the poverty line, including 21.2% of those under age 18 and 14.1% of those age 65 or over.

As of 2010, Scott County had a population of 11,233. The racial makeup was 85.35% white, 0.47% black, 1.85% Native American, 3.42% Asian, 2.12% Non-Hispanics reporting more than one race and 6.96% Hispanics or Latinos.

== Government ==
=== Government ===
The county government is a constitutional body granted specific powers by the Constitution of Arkansas and the Arkansas Code. The quorum court is the legislative branch of the county government and controls all spending and revenue collection. Representatives are called justices of the peace and are elected from county districts every even-numbered year. The number of districts in a county vary from nine to fifteen, and district boundaries are drawn by the county election commission. The Scott County Quorum Court has nine members. Presiding over quorum court meetings is the county judge, who serves as the chief operating officer of the county. The county judge is elected at-large and does not vote in quorum court business, although capable of vetoing quorum court decisions.

Scott County, Arkansas Elected countywide officials
Position	Officeholder	Party
County Judge	Brian K. Jones	Republican
County/Circuit Clerk	Brianna Freeman	(Unknown)
Sheriff/Collector	Randy Shores	Independent
Treasurer	Teresa Scantling	Republican
Assessor	Terri Churchill	Independent
Coroner	Dana Anderson	(Unknown)

The composition of the Quorum Court following the 2024 elections is at least 4 Republicans and 4 Independents, with one party affiliation unknown. Justices of the Peace (members) of the Quorum Court following the elections are:

- District 1: Bobby Hattabaugh (R)
- District 2: Melvin Parker (R)
- District 3: Leonard Russell (I)
- District 4: Linda L. Vaughn (I)
- District 5: Jamie Lynn Goff (I)
- District 6: Tommy Roberson (I)
- District 7: John Luttrell (R)
- District 8: Lance Stinson
- District 9: Tara Brackett (R)

=== Politics ===
Scott County is represented the Arkansas House of Representatives by the Republicans Marcus Richmond, a businessman from Harvey, and Jon Eubanks, a farmer and Certified Public Accountant from Paris. Over the past few election cycles Scott County has trended heavily towards the GOP. The last Democrat (as of 2024) to carry this county was Bill Clinton in 1996. By margin, it was the most Republican county in Arkansas in the 2020 United States Presidential Election and the 2024 United States Presidential Election.

United States presidential election results for Scott County, Arkansas
Year	Republican		Democratic		Third party(ies)	
Year	No.	%	No.	%	No.	%
1892	398	25.46%	967	61.87%	198	12.67%
1896	264	16.91%	1,260	80.72%	37	2.37%
1900	313	29.39%	733	68.83%	19	1.78%
1904	458	45.26%	458	45.26%	96	9.49%
1908	481	30.12%	893	55.92%	223	13.96%
1912	206	16.60%	640	51.57%	395	31.83%
1916	514	27.30%	1,369	72.70%	0	0.00%
1920	751	46.88%	771	48.13%	80	4.99%
1924	375	33.24%	607	53.81%	146	12.94%
1928	573	38.85%	891	60.41%	11	0.75%
1932	174	13.26%	1,042	79.42%	96	7.32%
1936	363	24.17%	1,137	75.70%	2	0.13%
1940	353	26.09%	992	73.32%	8	0.59%
1944	348	27.93%	898	72.07%	0	0.00%
1948	260	18.47%	1,093	77.63%	55	3.91%
1952	893	42.50%	1,197	56.97%	11	0.52%
1956	1,637	56.47%	1,248	43.05%	14	0.48%
1960	1,137	50.22%	1,116	49.29%	11	0.49%
1964	1,121	37.82%	1,838	62.01%	5	0.17%
1968	1,162	34.18%	1,000	29.41%	1,238	36.41%
1972	2,424	75.87%	771	24.13%	0	0.00%
1976	1,427	33.09%	2,880	66.79%	5	0.12%
1980	2,228	48.16%	2,236	48.34%	162	3.50%
1984	3,066	65.11%	1,609	34.17%	34	0.72%
1988	2,507	58.82%	1,707	40.05%	48	1.13%
1992	1,695	37.15%	2,228	48.84%	639	14.01%
1996	1,426	33.19%	2,259	52.57%	612	14.24%
2000	2,399	60.26%	1,444	36.27%	138	3.47%
2004	2,514	62.26%	1,473	36.48%	51	1.26%
2008	2,791	69.86%	1,053	26.36%	151	3.78%
2012	2,631	72.28%	897	24.64%	112	3.08%
2016	2,731	77.81%	602	17.15%	177	5.04%
2020	2,962	83.41%	483	13.60%	106	2.99%
2024	2,913	86.08%	425	12.56%	46	1.36%

== Communities ==
=== Cities ===
- Mansfield
- Waldron (county seat)

=== Census-designated places ===
- Boles

=== Townships ===
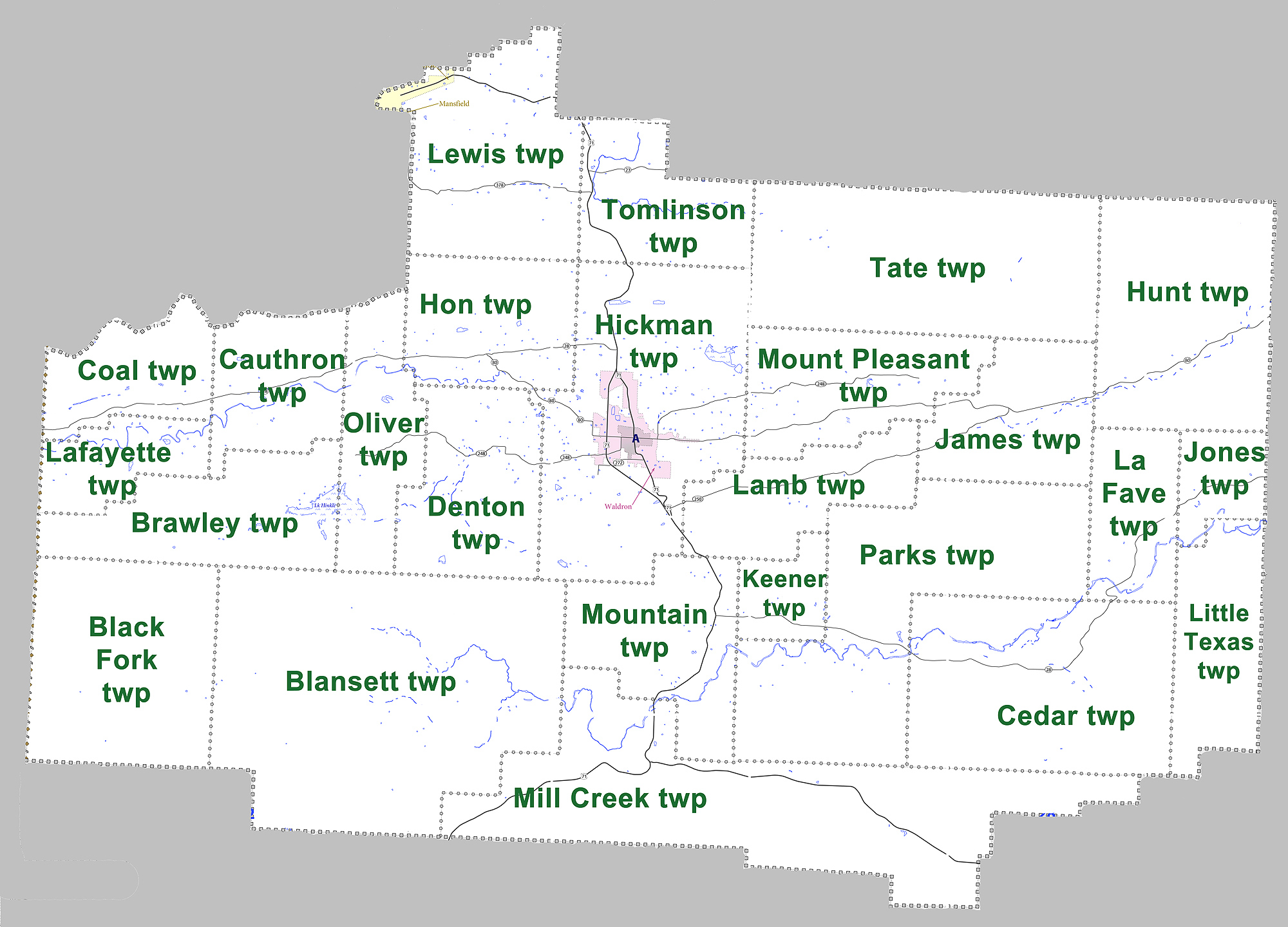
Townships in Scott County, Arkansas as of 2010

Townships in Arkansas are the divisions of a county. Each township includes unincorporated areas; some may have incorporated cities or towns within part of their boundaries. Arkansas townships have limited purposes in modern times. However, the United States census does list Arkansas population based on townships (sometimes referred to as "county subdivisions" or "minor civil divisions"). Townships are also of value for historical purposes in terms of genealogical research. Each town or city is within one or more townships in an Arkansas county based on census maps and publications. The townships of Scott County are listed below; listed in parentheses are the cities, towns, and/or census-designated places that are fully or partially inside the township.

- Black Fork
- Blansett
- Brawley
- Cauthron
- Cedar
- Coal
- Denton
- Hickman (Waldron)
- Hon
- Hunt
- James
- Jones
- Keener
- La Faye
- Lafayette
- Lamb
- Lewis (Mansfield)
- Little Texas
- Mill Creek
- Mountain
- Mount Pleasant
- Oliver
- Parks
- Tate
- Tomlinson

== See also ==
- List of lakes in Scott County, Arkansas
- National Register of Historic Places listings in Scott County, Arkansas
