= 1908 United States presidential election in Arkansas =

- November 3, 1908
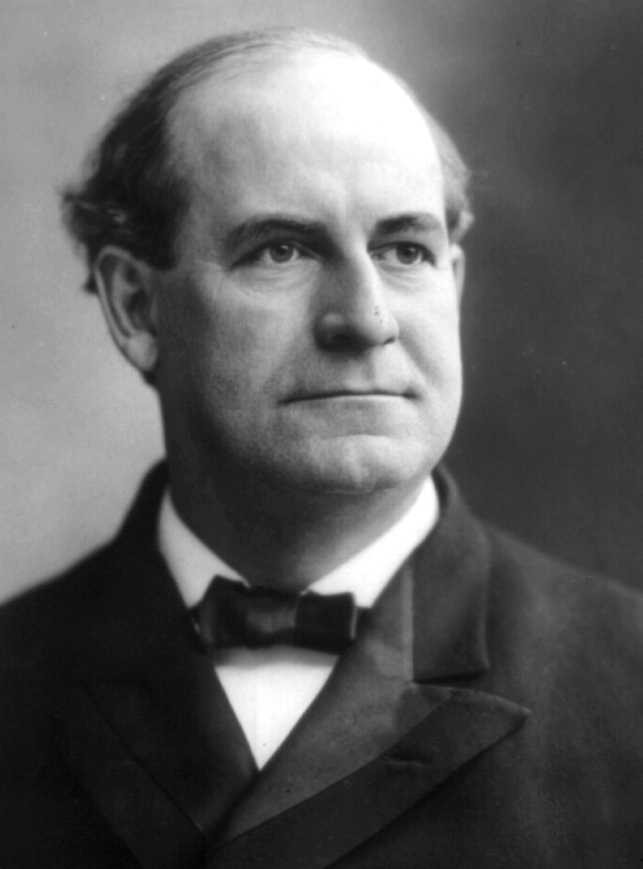

Nominee	William Jennings Bryan	William Howard Taft
Party	Democratic	Republican
Home state	Nebraska	Ohio
Running mate	John W. Kern	James S. Sherman
Electoral vote	9	0
Popular vote	87,015	56,624
Percentage	57.31%	37.30%
County results
Bryan
40–50%
50–60%
60–70%
70–80%
Taft
40–50%
50–60%
President before election
Theodore Roosevelt
Republican
Elected President
William Howard Taft
Republican

The 1908 United States presidential election in Arkansas took place on November 3, 1908. All contemporary 46 states were part of the 1908 United States presidential election. Voters chose nine electors to the Electoral College, which selected the president and vice president.

Since 1890, Arkansas had been a classic Jim Crow Southern state in which most blacks and poor whites had been disfranchised by poll taxes. This would confine significant Republican Party politics to the two Unionist Ozark counties of Newton and Searcy that remained controlled by the GOP at a local level throughout the “Solid South” era. Because the coinage of silver had been the dominant political issue apart from black disfranchisement ever since the poll tax was passed, the state would powerfully back “free silver” Democrat William Jennings Bryan in 1896. However, in the following elections disfranchisement affected poor whites more than blacks, with the result that the Republican Party became somewhat more competitive despite being still associated with Reconstruction. Bryan would later win Arkansas again in 1900. The GOP was helped in the earlier 1900s elections by the view that 1904 Democratic nominee Alton B. Parker had betrayed Bryan with his support for the gold standard.

By October polls made it clear that Arkansas would stay firmly with the “Solid South”, and this is what was observed: indeed Bryan improved on Parker's 1904 margin, winning the state against William Howard Taft by a margin of 20.01% (up from Parker's 15.1% in 1904) despite the dislike of Bryan's retreat from free silver.

== Results ==
1908 United States presidential election in Arkansas
Party	Candidate	Votes	Percentage	Electoral votes
Democratic	William Jennings Bryan	87,015	57.31%	9
Republican	William Howard Taft	56,624	37.30%	0
Social Democratic	Eugene V. Debs	5,842	3.85%	0
Prohibition	Eugene W. Chafin	1,026	0.68%	0
Populist	Thomas E. Watson	1,026	0.68%	0
Independence	Thomas L. Hisgen	289	0.19%	0
Totals		151,822	100.00%	9
Voter turnout				40%

=== Results by county ===
1908 United States presidential election in Arkansas by county
County	William Jennings Bryan Democratic		William Howard Taft Republican		Eugene Victor Debs Socialist		Various candidates Other parties		Margin		Total votes cast
County	#	%	#	%	#	%	#	%	#	%	Total votes cast
Arkansas	937	56.04%	672	40.19%	42	2.51%	21	1.26%	265	15.85%	1,672
Ashley	1,100	55.25%	821	41.24%	45	2.26%	25	1.26%	279	14.01%	1,991
Baxter	607	62.19%	300	30.74%	64	6.56%	5	0.51%	307	31.45%	976
Benton	3,067	63.82%	1,527	31.77%	155	3.23%	57	1.19%	1,540	32.04%	4,806
Boone	1,149	60.25%	681	35.71%	64	3.36%	13	0.68%	468	24.54%	1,907
Bradley	906	71.96%	316	25.10%	30	2.38%	7	0.56%	590	46.86%	1,259
Calhoun	554	69.34%	234	29.29%	8	1.00%	3	0.38%	320	40.05%	799
Carroll	1,295	53.25%	1,051	43.22%	72	2.96%	14	0.58%	244	10.03%	2,432
Chicot	438	40.29%	644	59.25%	2	0.18%	3	0.28%	-206	-18.95%	1,087
Clark	1,206	52.07%	1,007	43.48%	27	1.17%	76	3.28%	199	8.59%	2,316
Clay	1,527	56.35%	1,069	39.45%	106	3.91%	8	0.30%	458	16.90%	2,710
Cleburne	506	54.47%	294	31.65%	55	5.92%	74	7.97%	212	22.82%	929
Cleveland	771	61.48%	426	33.97%	39	3.11%	18	1.44%	345	27.51%	1,254
Columbia	1,613	65.57%	817	33.21%	9	0.37%	21	0.85%	796	32.36%	2,460
Conway	2,533	74.43%	818	24.04%	45	1.32%	7	0.21%	1,715	50.40%	3,403
Craighead	1,653	64.47%	711	27.73%	165	6.44%	35	1.37%	942	36.74%	2,564
Crawford	1,261	47.07%	1,339	49.98%	67	2.50%	12	0.45%	-78	-2.91%	2,679
Crittenden	428	52.20%	382	46.59%	6	0.73%	4	0.49%	46	5.61%	820
Cross	705	55.38%	507	39.83%	59	4.63%	2	0.16%	198	15.55%	1,273
Dallas	721	50.17%	636	44.26%	33	2.30%	47	3.27%	85	5.92%	1,437
Desha	518	65.40%	263	33.21%	6	0.76%	5	0.63%	255	32.20%	792
Drew	1,123	60.44%	679	36.54%	40	2.15%	16	0.86%	444	23.90%	1,858
Faulkner	1,771	67.01%	740	28.00%	93	3.52%	39	1.48%	1,031	39.01%	2,643
Franklin	1,311	63.58%	565	27.40%	119	5.77%	67	3.25%	746	36.18%	2,062
Fulton	741	62.69%	366	30.96%	63	5.33%	12	1.02%	375	31.73%	1,182
Garland	1,340	52.04%	1,105	42.91%	105	4.08%	25	0.97%	235	9.13%	2,575
Grant	524	74.64%	160	22.79%	16	2.28%	2	0.28%	364	51.85%	702
Greene	1,606	71.60%	549	24.48%	82	3.66%	6	0.27%	1,057	47.12%	2,243
Hempstead	1,779	55.09%	1,346	41.68%	27	0.84%	77	2.38%	433	13.41%	3,229
Hot Spring	833	53.19%	686	43.81%	23	1.47%	24	1.53%	147	9.39%	1,566
Howard	967	55.86%	610	35.24%	83	4.79%	71	4.10%	357	20.62%	1,731
Independence	1,529	57.61%	948	35.72%	109	4.11%	68	2.56%	581	21.89%	2,654
Izard	873	64.00%	392	28.74%	53	3.89%	46	3.37%	481	35.26%	1,364
Jackson	1,055	51.77%	864	42.39%	101	4.96%	18	0.88%	191	9.37%	2,038
Jefferson	1,585	50.72%	1,386	44.35%	125	4.00%	29	0.93%	199	6.37%	3,125
Johnson	1,164	62.35%	544	29.14%	140	7.50%	19	1.02%	620	33.21%	1,867
Lafayette	739	56.37%	552	42.11%	4	0.31%	16	1.22%	187	14.26%	1,311
Lawrence	1,188	64.78%	583	31.79%	59	3.22%	4	0.22%	605	32.99%	1,834
Lee	1,182	75.33%	354	22.56%	29	1.85%	4	0.25%	828	52.77%	1,569
Lincoln	389	66.95%	159	27.37%	16	2.75%	17	2.93%	230	39.59%	581
Little River	660	53.35%	435	35.17%	105	8.49%	37	2.99%	225	18.19%	1,237
Logan	1,716	57.62%	1,151	38.65%	88	2.96%	23	0.77%	565	18.97%	2,978
Lonoke	1,385	67.33%	592	28.78%	30	1.46%	50	2.43%	793	38.55%	2,057
Madison	1,441	47.01%	1,541	50.28%	69	2.25%	14	0.46%	-100	-3.26%	3,065
Marion	705	60.83%	370	31.92%	81	6.99%	3	0.26%	335	28.90%	1,159
Miller	1,035	56.19%	722	39.20%	36	1.95%	49	2.66%	313	16.99%	1,842
Mississippi	930	41.10%	1,167	51.57%	155	6.85%	11	0.49%	-237	-10.47%	2,263
Monroe	912	46.01%	1,022	51.56%	41	2.07%	7	0.35%	-110	-5.55%	1,982
Montgomery	553	46.59%	522	43.98%	87	7.33%	25	2.11%	31	2.61%	1,187
Nevada	890	45.32%	784	39.92%	47	2.39%	243	12.37%	106	5.40%	1,964
Newton	377	37.74%	582	58.26%	36	3.60%	4	0.40%	-205	-20.52%	999
Ouachita	1,166	43.20%	1,505	55.76%	14	0.52%	14	0.52%	-339	-12.56%	2,699
Perry	608	54.14%	445	39.63%	65	5.79%	5	0.45%	163	14.51%	1,123
Phillips	1,194	74.91%	393	24.65%	3	0.19%	4	0.25%	801	50.25%	1,594
Pike	568	47.22%	601	49.96%	21	1.75%	13	1.08%	-33	-2.74%	1,203
Poinsett	843	64.11%	462	35.13%	2	0.15%	8	0.61%	381	28.97%	1,315
Polk	824	49.70%	628	37.88%	165	9.95%	41	2.47%	196	11.82%	1,658
Pope	1,664	64.75%	811	31.56%	78	3.04%	17	0.66%	853	33.19%	2,570
Prairie	1,103	55.88%	812	41.13%	41	2.08%	18	0.91%	291	14.74%	1,974
Pulaski	3,893	50.33%	3,533	45.68%	228	2.95%	81	1.05%	360	4.65%	7,735
Randolph	1,348	70.35%	517	26.98%	28	1.46%	23	1.20%	831	43.37%	1,916
Saline	899	66.94%	369	27.48%	53	3.95%	22	1.64%	530	39.46%	1,343
Scott	893	55.92%	481	30.12%	175	10.96%	48	3.01%	412	25.80%	1,597
Searcy	597	42.89%	636	45.69%	141	10.13%	18	1.29%	-39	-2.80%	1,392
Sebastian	3,035	52.90%	2,050	35.73%	620	10.81%	32	0.56%	985	17.17%	5,737
Sevier	1,073	57.75%	526	28.31%	199	10.71%	60	3.23%	547	29.44%	1,858
Sharp	940	69.89%	317	23.57%	78	5.80%	10	0.74%	623	46.32%	1,345
St. Francis	619	41.91%	755	51.12%	80	5.42%	23	1.56%	-136	-9.21%	1,477
Stone	496	61.92%	267	33.33%	34	4.24%	4	0.50%	229	28.59%	801
Union	1,407	71.60%	535	27.23%	11	0.56%	12	0.61%	872	44.38%	1,965
Van Buren	797	50.64%	667	42.38%	39	2.48%	71	4.51%	130	8.26%	1,574
Washington	2,748	58.36%	1,704	36.19%	185	3.93%	72	1.53%	1,044	22.17%	4,709
White	1,718	57.88%	887	29.89%	176	5.93%	187	6.30%	831	28.00%	2,968
Woodruff	1,046	56.18%	752	40.39%	51	2.74%	13	0.70%	294	15.79%	1,862
Yell	1,743	58.16%	1,040	34.70%	194	6.47%	20	0.67%	703	23.46%	2,997
Totals	87,020	57.31%	56,684	37.33%	5,842	3.85%	2,299	1.51%	30,336	19.98%	151,845

== See also ==
- United States presidential elections in Arkansas
