= Jackson County, Arkansas =

County in Arkansas, United States

- County
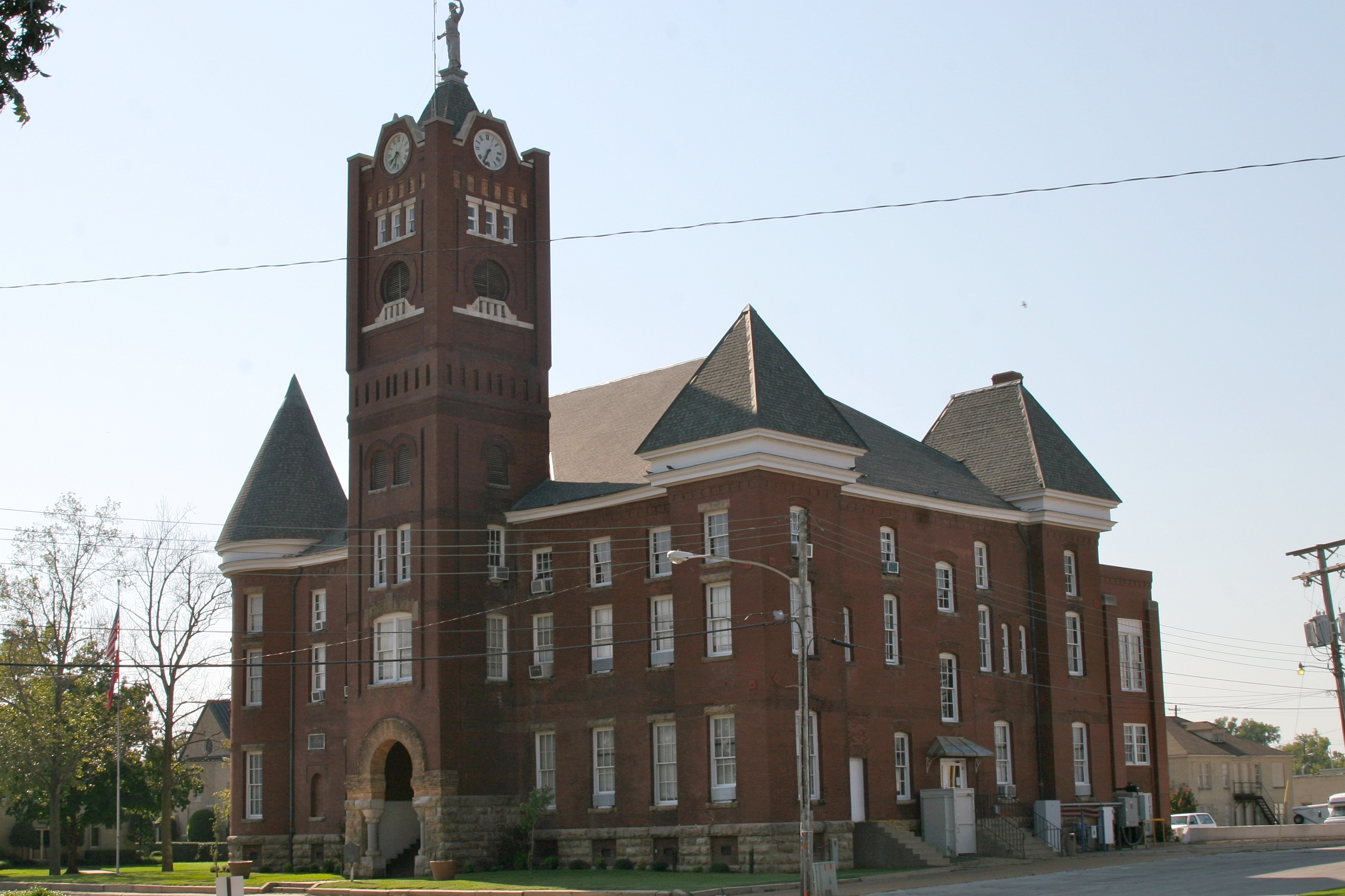
- Jackson County Courthouse

- Location within the U.S. state of Arkansas
- Coordinates: 35°35′38″N 91°11′37″W
- Country: United States
- State: Arkansas
- Founded: November 5, 1829
- Named for: Andrew Jackson
- Seat: Newport
- Largest city: Newport

Area
  - Total: 642 sq mi (1,660 km^{2})
  - Land: 634 sq mi (1,640 km^{2})
  - Water: 7.6 sq mi (20 km^{2}) 1.2%

Population (2020)
  - Total: 16,755
  - Estimate (2025): 16,741 ▼
  - Density: 26.4/sq mi (10.2/km^{2})
- Time zone: UTC−6 (Central)
  - Summer (DST): UTC−5 (CDT)
- Congressional district: 1st
- Website: jacksoncountyar.com

Jackson County is located in the Arkansas Delta in the U.S. state of Arkansas. The county is named for Andrew Jackson, a national hero during the War of 1812. By the county's formation in 1829, Jackson had become the seventh President of the United States. Jackson County is home to seven incorporated towns and four incorporated cities, including Newport, the largest city and county seat. The county is also the site of numerous unincorporated communities and ghost towns. Occupying 633.94 square miles (164,190 ha), Jackson County is the 41st largest county of the 75 in Arkansas. As of the 2020 Census, the county's population was 16,755. Based on population, the county is the 44th-largest county in Arkansas. Although terrain rises in the west, most of Jackson County is within the Arkansas Delta, characterized by largely flat terrain with fertile soils. Historically covered in forest, bayous and swamps, the area was cleared for agriculture by early settlers. It is drained by the White River. Interstate Highway 57 (concurrent with US Route 67) runs through Jackson County, as well as fifteen Arkansas state highways. A Union Pacific Railroad line also crosses the county.

== Geography ==
According to the U.S. Census Bureau, the county has a total area of 642 square miles (1,660 km^{2}), of which 634 square miles (1,640 km^{2}) is land and 7.6 square miles (20 km^{2}) (1.2%) is water.

=== Major highways ===
- Interstate 57 / U.S. Highway 67
- U.S. Highway 167
- Highway 14
- Highway 17
- Highway 18
  - Highway 18 Spur
- Highway 33
- Highway 37
- Highway 42
- Highway 69
  - Highway 69 Spur
- Highway 87
- Highway 145
- Highway 157
- Highway 224
- Highway 226
- Highway 267
- Highway 367
- Highway 384
- Airport Highway 980

=== Adjacent counties ===
- Lawrence County (north)
- Craighead County (northeast)
- Poinsett County (east)
- Cross County (southeast)
- Woodruff County (south)
- White County (southwest)
- Independence County (west)

=== National protected area ===
- Cache River National Wildlife Refuge (part)

== Demographics ==
Historical population
Census	Pop.	Note	%±
1830	333		—
1840	1,540		362.5%
1850	3,086		100.4%
1860	10,493		240.0%
1870	7,268		−30.7%
1880	10,877		49.7%
1890	15,179		39.6%
1900	18,383		21.1%
1910	23,501		27.8%
1920	25,446		8.3%
1930	27,943		9.8%
1940	26,427		−5.4%
1950	25,912		−1.9%
1960	22,843		−11.8%
1970	20,452		−10.5%
1980	21,646		5.8%
1990	18,944		−12.5%
2000	18,418		−2.8%
2010	17,997		−2.3%
2020	16,755		−6.9%
2025 (est.)	16,741	▼	−0.1%
U.S. Decennial Census; 1790–1960 1900–1990; 1990–2000 2010

=== 2020 census ===
As of the 2020 census, the county had a population of 16,755. The median age was 40.8 years. 19.8% of residents were under the age of 18 and 18.1% of residents were 65 years of age or older. For every 100 females there were 94.4 males, and for every 100 females age 18 and over there were 92.8 males age 18 and over.

The racial makeup of the county was 76.9% White, 16.6% Black or African American, 0.3% American Indian and Alaska Native, 0.4% Asian, <0.1% Native Hawaiian and Pacific Islander, 1.6% from some other race, and 4.2% from two or more races. Hispanic or Latino residents of any race comprised 2.8% of the population.

35.5% of residents lived in urban areas, while 64.5% lived in rural areas.

There were 6,203 households in the county, of which 28.5% had children under the age of 18 living in them. Of all households, 41.7% were married-couple households, 20.9% were households with a male householder and no spouse or partner present, and 31.8% were households with a female householder and no spouse or partner present. About 32.9% of all households were made up of individuals and 14.5% had someone living alone who was 65 years of age or older.

There were 7,079 housing units, of which 12.4% were vacant. Among occupied housing units, 63.5% were owner-occupied and 36.5% were renter-occupied. The homeowner vacancy rate was 2.0% and the rental vacancy rate was 8.3%.

=== 2000 census ===
As of the 2000 census, there were 18,418 people, 6,971 households, and 4,830 families residing in the county. The population density was 29 people per square mile (11 people/km^{2}). There were 7,956 housing units at an average density of 13 units per square mile (5.0 units/km^{2}). The racial makeup of the county was 80.57% White, 17.56% Black or African American, 0.33% Native American, 0.18% Asian, 0.01% Pacific Islander, 0.40% from other races, and 0.95% from two or more races. 1.27% of the population were Hispanic or Latino of any race.

There were 6,971 households, out of which 27.70% had children under the age of 18 living with them, 52.20% were married couples living together, 13.10% had a female householder with no husband present, and 30.70% were non-families. 27.90% of all households were made up of individuals, and 14.40% had someone living alone who was 65 years of age or older. The average household size was 2.40 and the average family size was 2.92.

In the county, the population was spread out, with 22.20% under the age of 18, 11.50% from 18 to 24, 26.00% from 25 to 44, 23.80% from 45 to 64, and 16.50% who were 65 years of age or older. The median age was 38 years. For every 100 females there were 91.20 males. For every 100 females age 18 and over, there were 87.80 males.

The median income for a household in the county was $25,081, and the median income for a family was $32,661. Males had a median income of $26,744 versus $17,830 for females. The per capita income for the county was $14,564. About 13.20% of families and 17.40% of the population were below the poverty line, including 25.00% of those under age 18 and 16.70% of those age 65 or over.

== Government and infrastructure ==
=== Government ===
The county government is a constitutional body granted specific powers by the Constitution of Arkansas and the Arkansas Code. The quorum court is the legislative branch of the county government and controls all spending and revenue collection. Representatives are called justices of the peace and are elected from county districts every even-numbered year. The number of districts in a county vary from nine to fifteen, and district boundaries are drawn by the county election commission. The Jackson County Quorum Court has nine members. Presiding over quorum court meetings is the county judge, who serves as the chief executive officer of the county. The county judge is elected at-large and does not vote in quorum court business, although capable of vetoing quorum court decisions.

Jackson County, Arkansas Elected countywide officials
Position	Officeholder	Party
County Judge	Jeff Phillips	Republican
County Clerk	Melanie Clark	Republican
Circuit Clerk	Barbara Metzger Hackney	Republican
Sheriff	Russell Brinsfield	Republican
Treasurer	Jamie Cason	Republican
Collector	Kelly Walker	Republican
Assessor	Diann Ballard	Republican
Coroner	Cris Driver	Republican

The composition of the Quorum Court after the 2024 elections is 8 Republicans and 1 Democrat. Justices of the Peace (members) of the Quorum Court following the elections are:

- District 1: Rusty Kinder (R)
- District 2: Tommy Young (R)
- District 3: David R. Howard (R)
- District 4: Bryan Smith (R)
- District 5: Clay Young (R)
- District 6: Mark Harmon (R)
- District 7: Jerry W. Mann (D)
- District 8: Lendol Falwell (R)
- District 9: Robby Stewart (R)

Additionally, the townships of Jackson County are entitled to elect their own respective constables, as set forth by the Constitution of Arkansas. Constables are largely of historical significance as they were used to keep the peace in rural areas when travel was more difficult.

The township constables as of the 2024 elections are:

- Brock: James Brock (R)
- Clark: Chris Clark (R)
- McGee: Patrick McGee (R)
- Thatcher: Dylan Thatcher (R)

=== Infrastructure ===
The Grimes Unit and the McPherson Unit, prisons of the Arkansas Department of Correction, are located in Newport, off of Arkansas Highway 384, 4 miles (6.4 km) east of central Newport. The prison houses the state's death row for women. The Jackson County Sheriff's Office is the primary county-wide law enforcement agency.

=== Politics ===
United States presidential election results for Jackson County, Arkansas
Year	Republican		Democratic		Third party(ies)	
Year	No.	%	No.	%	No.	%
1896	588	26.95%	1,585	72.64%	9	0.41%
1900	598	36.05%	1,050	63.29%	11	0.66%
1904	677	47.28%	746	52.09%	9	0.63%
1908	864	42.39%	1,055	51.77%	119	5.84%
1912	543	31.94%	837	49.24%	320	18.82%
1916	476	26.05%	1,351	73.95%	0	0.00%
1920	1,131	40.34%	1,575	56.17%	98	3.50%
1924	392	25.44%	1,069	69.37%	80	5.19%
1928	698	31.24%	1,527	68.35%	9	0.40%
1932	193	7.09%	2,521	92.58%	9	0.33%
1936	327	13.19%	2,151	86.77%	1	0.04%
1940	382	14.54%	2,223	84.59%	23	0.88%
1944	414	15.15%	2,318	84.85%	0	0.00%
1948	338	10.34%	2,696	82.45%	236	7.22%
1952	1,516	25.62%	4,401	74.38%	0	0.00%
1956	1,323	26.14%	3,699	73.09%	39	0.77%
1960	1,986	38.50%	2,860	55.44%	313	6.07%
1964	2,141	31.36%	4,651	68.12%	36	0.53%
1968	1,356	19.56%	2,051	29.59%	3,525	50.85%
1972	4,196	66.73%	2,092	33.27%	0	0.00%
1976	1,783	21.64%	6,456	78.36%	0	0.00%
1980	3,191	39.49%	4,651	57.55%	239	2.96%
1984	3,901	48.88%	4,038	50.60%	42	0.53%
1988	3,049	41.90%	4,199	57.71%	28	0.38%
1992	1,864	24.77%	4,944	65.71%	716	9.52%
1996	1,525	23.46%	4,304	66.22%	671	10.32%
2000	2,280	37.55%	3,651	60.13%	141	2.32%
2004	2,624	42.19%	3,515	56.52%	80	1.29%
2008	3,118	55.86%	2,207	39.54%	257	4.60%
2012	3,072	57.45%	2,095	39.18%	180	3.37%
2016	3,267	63.36%	1,583	30.70%	306	5.93%
2020	3,593	70.58%	1,365	26.81%	133	2.61%
2024	3,509	73.49%	1,183	24.77%	83	1.74%

== Communities ==
=== Cities ===
- Campbell Station
- Diaz
- Grubbs
- Newport (county seat)
- Swifton
- Tuckerman

=== Towns ===
- Amagon
- Beedeville
- Jacksonport
- Tupelo
- Weldon

=== Unincorporated communities ===
- Balch
- Denmark
- Heffington
- Kenyon
- Macks
- Midway
- Olyphant
- Possum Grape

=== Ghost towns ===
- Colerain
- Estico
- Mt. Pinson
- Myrickville
- Sneed

=== Townships ===
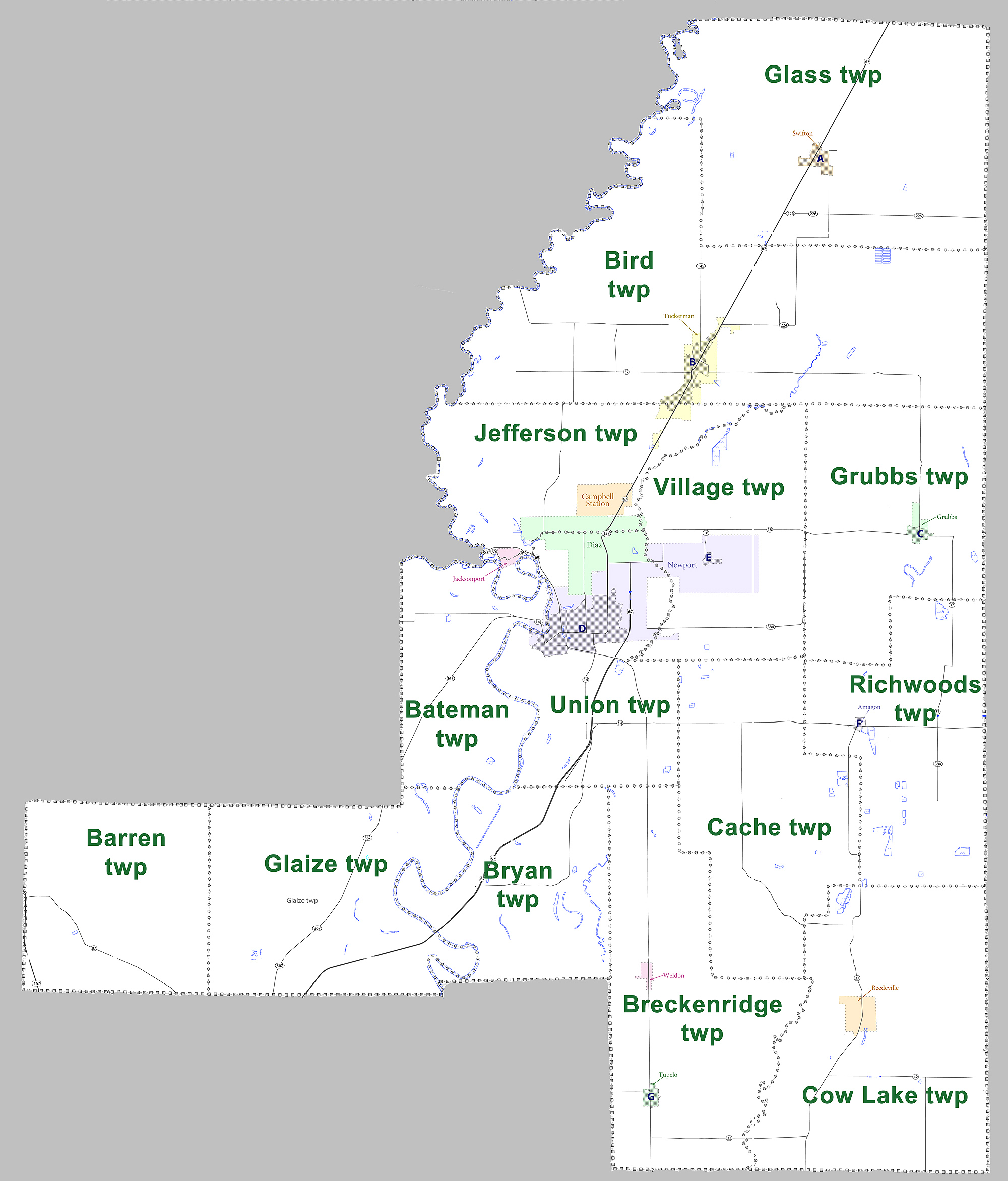
Townships in Jackson County, Arkansas as of 2010

Townships in Arkansas are the divisions of a county. Each township includes unincorporated areas; some may have incorporated cities or towns within part of their boundaries. Arkansas townships have limited purposes in modern times. However, the United States census does list Arkansas population based on townships (sometimes referred to as "county subdivisions" or "minor civil divisions"). Townships are also of value for historical purposes in terms of genealogical research. Each town or city is within one or more townships in an Arkansas county based on census maps and publications. The townships of Jackson County are listed below; listed in parentheses are the cities, towns, and/or census-designated places that are fully or partially inside the township.

- Barren
- Bateman (contains part of Newport)
- Bird (contains most of Tuckerman)
- Breckinridge (contains Tupelo and Weldon)
- Bryan
- Cache
- Cow Lake (contains Beedeville)
- Glaize
- Glass (contains Swifton)
- Grubbs (contains Grubbs)
- Jefferson (contains Campbell Station and Jacksonport, part of Diaz and Tuckerman)
- Richwoods (contains Amagon)
- Union (contains most of Diaz and Newport)
- Village (contains part of Diaz and Newport)

== Government and politics ==
Jackson County is represented in the Arkansas Senate by the Republican Ron Caldwell, a real estate businessman from Wynne in Cross County.

== See also ==
- List of lakes in Jackson County, Arkansas
- National Register of Historic Places listings in Jackson County, Arkansas
