= 1896 United States presidential election in Arkansas =

- November 3, 1896

Nominee	William Jennings Bryan	William McKinley
Party	Democratic	Republican
Alliance	Populist	-
Home state	Nebraska	Ohio
Running mate	Arthur Sewall (Democratic); Thomas E. Watson (People's)	Garret Hobart
Electoral vote	8	0
Popular vote	110,103	37,512
Percentage	73.72%	25.12%
County results
Bryan
50–60%
60–70%
70–80%
80–90%
90–100%
McKinley
50–60%
President before election
Grover Cleveland
Democratic
Elected President
William McKinley
Republican

The 1896 United States presidential election in Arkansas took place on November 3, 1896. All contemporary 45 states were part of the 1896 United States presidential election. Voters chose eight electors to the Electoral College, which selected the president and vice president.

This election marks the establishment of one-party hegemony in every county in Arkansas except Unionist Ozark Newton and Searcy where Republicans would control local government permanently. The new secret ballot and an onerous poll tax had already severely reduced black and poor white voting at the time of this election, in the process largely eliminating opposition party challenges.

Arkansas was won by the Democratic nominees, former U.S. Representative William Jennings Bryan of Nebraska and his running mate Arthur Sewall of Maine. Three electors cast their vice presidential ballots for Thomas E. Watson. They defeated Republican nominees, former Ohio Governor William McKinley and his running mate Garret Hobart of New Jersey. Bryan won the state by a landslide margin of 48.6%.

Bryan would later defeat McKinley again in Arkansas four years later and would later win the state against William Howard Taft in 1908.

== Results ==
1896 United States presidential election in Arkansas
Party	Candidate	Votes	Percentage	Electoral votes
Democratic	William Jennings Bryan	110,103	73.72%	8
Republican	William McKinley	37,512	25.12%	0
National Prohibition	Charles Eugene Bentley	893	0.60%	0
Prohibition	Joshua Levering	839	0.56%	0
Totals		149,347	100.00%	8
Voter turnout				—

=== Results by county ===
1896 United States presidential election in Arkansas by county
County	William Jennings Bryan Democratic		William McKinley Republican		Charles Eugene Bentley National Prohibition		Joshua Levering Prohibition		Margin		Total votes cast
County	#	%	#	%	#	%	#	%	#	%	Total votes cast
Arkansas	1,175	67.45%	550	31.57%	6	0.34%	11	0.63%	625	35.88%	1,742
Ashley	1,760	78.05%	405	17.96%	18	0.80%	72	3.19%	1,355	60.09%	2,255
Baxter	980	78.78%	262	21.06%	0	0.00%	2	0.16%	718	57.72%	1,244
Benton	3,548	83.15%	685	16.05%	13	0.30%	21	0.49%	2,863	67.10%	4,267
Boone	1,730	74.50%	573	24.68%	6	0.26%	13	0.56%	1,157	49.83%	2,322
Bradley	976	83.70%	185	15.87%	3	0.26%	2	0.17%	791	67.84%	1,166
Calhoun	910	80.53%	216	19.12%	2	0.18%	2	0.18%	694	61.42%	1,130
Carroll	1,790	66.08%	875	32.30%	23	0.85%	21	0.78%	915	33.78%	2,709
Chicot	418	55.00%	258	33.95%	17	2.24%	67	8.82%	160	21.05%	760
Clark	1,910	67.61%	833	29.49%	57	2.02%	25	0.88%	1,077	38.12%	2,825
Clay	1,537	75.57%	475	23.35%	10	0.49%	12	0.59%	1,062	52.21%	2,034
Cleburne	1,047	89.79%	108	9.26%	7	0.60%	4	0.34%	939	80.53%	1,166
Cleveland	1,269	83.71%	231	15.24%	8	0.53%	8	0.53%	1,038	68.47%	1,516
Columbia	2,159	79.76%	537	19.84%	4	0.15%	7	0.26%	1,622	59.92%	2,707
Conway	2,255	76.99%	656	22.40%	7	0.24%	11	0.38%	1,599	54.59%	2,929
Craighead	1,890	84.98%	329	14.79%	2	0.09%	3	0.13%	1,561	70.19%	2,224
Crawford	1,870	58.46%	1,311	40.98%	8	0.25%	10	0.31%	559	17.47%	3,199
Crittenden	625	69.99%	258	28.89%	5	0.56%	5	0.56%	367	41.10%	893
Cross	908	80.14%	224	19.77%	0	0.00%	1	0.09%	684	60.37%	1,133
Dallas	1,032	67.98%	479	31.55%	5	0.33%	2	0.13%	553	36.43%	1,518
Desha	396	55.31%	290	40.50%	21	2.93%	9	1.26%	106	14.80%	716
Drew	1,754	74.07%	603	25.46%	5	0.21%	6	0.25%	1,151	48.61%	2,368
Faulkner	2,044	75.31%	556	20.49%	6	0.23%	8	0.31%	1,488	54.83%	2,714
Franklin	1,746	78.19%	424	18.99%	25	1.12%	38	1.70%	1,322	59.20%	2,233
Fulton	1,259	78.93%	333	20.88%	2	0.13%	1	0.06%	926	58.06%	1,595
Garland	1,465	65.29%	703	31.33%	40	1.78%	36	1.60%	762	33.96%	2,244
Grant	801	86.04%	125	13.43%	2	0.21%	3	0.32%	676	72.61%	931
Greene	1,627	85.63%	262	13.79%	7	0.37%	4	0.21%	1,365	71.84%	1,900
Hempstead	1,832	59.79%	1,203	39.26%	10	0.33%	19	0.62%	629	20.53%	3,064
Hot Spring	1,331	80.96%	292	17.76%	9	0.55%	12	0.73%	1,039	63.20%	1,644
Howard	1,392	82.42%	294	17.41%	1	0.06%	2	0.12%	1,098	65.01%	1,689
Independence	2,089	78.06%	567	21.19%	9	0.34%	11	0.41%	1,522	56.88%	2,676
Izard	1,507	82.98%	285	15.69%	11	0.61%	13	0.72%	1,222	67.29%	1,816
Jackson	1,585	72.64%	588	26.95%	0	0.00%	9	0.41%	997	45.69%	2,182
Jefferson	1,653	60.11%	1,050	38.18%	27	0.98%	20	0.73%	603	21.93%	2,750
Johnson	1,831	78.55%	491	21.06%	3	0.13%	6	0.26%	1,340	57.49%	2,331
Lafayette	608	58.69%	423	40.83%	2	0.19%	3	0.29%	185	17.86%	1,036
Lawrence	1,679	81.78%	337	16.42%	23	1.12%	14	0.68%	1,342	65.37%	2,053
Lee	1,946	88.41%	213	9.68%	23	1.04%	19	0.86%	1,733	78.74%	2,201
Lincoln	1,026	81.11%	236	18.66%	2	0.16%	1	0.08%	790	62.45%	1,265
Little River	852	74.80%	273	23.97%	7	0.61%	7	0.61%	579	50.83%	1,139
Logan	1,786	65.16%	946	34.51%	6	0.22%	3	0.11%	840	30.65%	2,741
Lonoke	2,300	83.27%	437	15.82%	12	0.43%	13	0.47%	1,863	67.45%	2,762
Madison	1,689	56.64%	1,260	42.25%	16	0.54%	17	0.57%	429	14.39%	2,982
Marion	1,212	76.90%	336	21.32%	25	1.59%	3	0.19%	876	55.58%	1,576
Miller	1,073	65.07%	565	34.26%	6	0.36%	5	0.30%	508	30.81%	1,649
Mississippi	815	82.74%	168	17.06%	2	0.20%	0	0.00%	647	65.69%	985
Monroe	1,019	64.01%	436	27.39%	77	4.84%	60	3.77%	583	36.62%	1,592
Montgomery	1,008	82.08%	220	17.92%	0	0.00%	0	0.00%	788	64.17%	1,228
Nevada	1,669	77.66%	469	21.82%	4	0.19%	7	0.33%	1,200	55.84%	2,149
Newton	659	46.94%	733	52.21%	4	0.28%	8	0.57%	-74	-5.27%	1,404
Ouachita	1,366	56.77%	1,029	42.77%	2	0.08%	9	0.37%	337	14.01%	2,406
Perry	678	75.25%	217	24.08%	4	0.44%	2	0.22%	461	51.17%	901
Phillips	1,085	54.85%	815	41.20%	43	2.17%	35	1.77%	270	13.65%	1,978
Pike	864	78.69%	231	21.04%	2	0.18%	1	0.09%	633	57.65%	1,098
Poinsett	572	80.34%	130	18.26%	3	0.42%	7	0.98%	442	62.08%	712
Polk	1,004	94.10%	51	4.78%	4	0.37%	8	0.75%	953	89.32%	1,067
Pope	2,315	74.75%	762	24.60%	13	0.42%	7	0.23%	1,553	50.15%	3,097
Prairie	1,145	64.22%	633	35.50%	3	0.17%	2	0.11%	512	28.72%	1,783
Pulaski	3,021	61.73%	1,754	35.84%	74	1.51%	45	0.92%	1,267	25.89%	4,894
Randolph	1,915	86.03%	307	13.79%	4	0.18%	0	0.00%	1,608	72.24%	2,226
St. Francis	1,087	70.13%	455	29.35%	2	0.12%	0	0.00%	632	40.77%	1,550
Saline	1,417	84.00%	268	15.89%	31	1.99%	6	0.38%	1,149	68.11%	1,687
Scott	1,260	80.72%	264	16.91%	2	0.15%	2	0.15%	996	63.81%	1,561
Searcy	615	45.35%	737	54.35%	12	0.33%	17	0.46%	-122	-9.00%	1,356
Sebastian	2,622	71.64%	1,009	27.57%	4	0.30%	3	0.22%	1,613	44.07%	3,660
Sevier	1,166	86.82%	170	12.66%	1	0.06%	2	0.12%	996	74.16%	1,343
Sharp	1,383	85.58%	230	14.23%	3	0.19%	5	0.32%	1,153	71.35%	1,616
Stone	728	80.26%	172	18.96%	5	0.55%	2	0.22%	556	61.30%	907
Union	1,749	89.37%	148	7.56%	29	1.48%	31	1.58%	1,601	81.81%	1,957
Van Buren	846	67.90%	374	30.02%	20	1.61%	6	0.48%	472	37.88%	1,246
Washington	3,208	72.17%	1,197	26.93%	17	0.38%	23	0.52%	2,011	45.24%	4,445
White	2,876	83.12%	559	16.16%	17	0.49%	8	0.23%	2,317	66.97%	3,460
Woodruff	1,478	70.15%	620	29.43%	5	0.24%	4	0.19%	858	40.72%	2,107
Yell	2,261	73.29%	812	26.32%	4	0.13%	8	0.26%	1,449	46.97%	3,085
Totals (Note: Totals from Géoelections differ from those in Dave Leip’s Atlas and The Presidential Vote.)	110,103	73.65%	37,512	25.09%	892	0.60%	889	0.60%	72,591	48.56%	149,496

== See also ==
- United States presidential elections in Arkansas
