= 1928 United States presidential election in Arkansas =

- November 6, 1928

| Nominee | Al Smith | Herbert Hoover |
| Party | Democratic | Republican |
| Home state | New York | California |
| Running mate | Joseph T. Robinson | Charles Curtis |
| Electoral vote | 9 | 0 |
| Popular vote | 123,140 | 77,789 |
| Percentage | 61.06% | 38.57% |
County results
Smith
50–60%
60–70%
70–80%
80–90%
Hoover
50–60%
60–70%
70–80%
President before election
Calvin Coolidge
Republican
Elected President
Herbert Hoover
Republican

The 1928 United States presidential election in Arkansas was held on November 6, 1928, as part of the 1928 United States presidential election. State voters chose nine electors, or representatives to the United States Electoral College, who voted for President and Vice-president.

Except for the Unionist Ozark counties of Newton and Searcy where Republicans controlled local government, Arkansas since the end of Reconstruction had been a classic one-party Democratic “Solid South” state. Disfranchisement of effectively all African Americans and most poor whites had meant that outside those two aberrant counties, the Republican Party was completely moribund and Democratic primaries the only competitive elections. As in other areas in and around the Ozarks, a strong Socialist Party movement did develop in the 1900s, but it nowhere was threatening to Democratic hegemony and intimidation largely eliminated its influence from the mid-1910s.

The 1920s did see a minor change in this, as increased voting by poor Ozark whites as a protest against Woodrow Wilson's internationalist foreign policy meant that Warren G. Harding was able to win almost forty percent of the statewide vote in 1920; however despite his national landslide Calvin Coolidge in 1924 could not do any more than win the two traditional Unionist GOP counties.

With all other prominent Democrats sitting the election out, the party nominated Alfred E. Smith, four-term Governor of New York as its nominee for 1928, with little opposition. Arkansas lies in the core of the Ozark “Bible Belt” and would have been expected to stand extremely vulnerable to anti-Catholic and pro-Prohibition voting – its public support for prohibiting the teaching of evolution in public schools showed Arkansas in the vanguard of fundamentalist Protestantism. Elsewhere in the White South, extreme fear ensued because the region had no experience of the Southern and Eastern European Catholic immigrants who were Smith's local constituency. Southern fundamentalist Protestants believed that Smith would allow papal and priestly leadership in the United States, which Protestantism was a reaction against. The Southern Baptist Convention said that

We enter into a sacred covenant and solemn pledge that we will support for the office of President, or any other office, only such men as stand for our present order of prohibition.

== Campaign ==
During July, the flagging Ku Klux Klan opposed Smith because of his stance against Prohibition, a reform Robinson supported without being dogmatic.

every native-born Protestant in Arkansas should oppose the election of any man who subscribes and is loyal to, or is a member of the Roman Catholic Church.

However, Robinson’s support of religious liberty was able to ameliorate opposition from Protestant ministers – whom Robinson felt was working for the Republican Party – to a greater extent than other Southern states except for wholly Deep South Louisiana, Mississippi and South Carolina, especially as Brough warned many people that Republican inroads would threaten white supremacy because white girls had worked with Negroes in Hoover’s Department of Commerce.

In counties along the Arkansas River, Smith may have also been helped by the perception that Hoover was ineffective at relieving the disastrous flooding of the Mississippi and Arkansas Rivers a year and a half beforehand.

== Results ==
Electoral results
| Presidential candidate | Party | Home state | Popular vote | | Electoral vote | Running mate | | |
| Presidential candidate | Party | Home state | Count | Percentage | Electoral vote | Vice-presidential candidate | Home state | Electoral vote |
|---|---|---|---|---|---|---|---|---|
| Alfred E. Smith | Democrat | New York | 123,140 | 61.06% | 9 | Joseph Taylor Robinson | Arkansas | 9 |
| Herbert Hoover | Republican | California | 77,789 | 38.57% | 0 | Charles Curtis | Kansas | 0 |
| Norman Thomas | Socialist | New York | 435 | 0.22% | 0 | James H. Maurer | Pennsylvania | 0 |
| William Z. Foster | Independent | Illinois | 322 | 0.16% | 0 | Benjamin Gitlow | New York | 0 |
| Total | | | 201,686 | 100% | 9 | | | 9 |
| Needed to win | | | | | 266 | | | 266 |

=== Results by county ===
1928 United States presidential election in Arkansas by county
| County | Alfred Emmanuel Smith Democratic | | Herbert Clark Hoover Republican | | Various candidates Other parties | | Margin | | Total votes cast |
| County | # | % | # | % | # | % | # | % | Total votes cast |
|---|---|---|---|---|---|---|---|---|---|
| Arkansas | 1,491 | 58.59% | 1,046 | 41.10% | 8 | 0.31% | 445 | 17.49% | 2,545 |
| Ashley | 1,393 | 63.84% | 786 | 36.02% | 3 | 0.14% | 607 | 27.82% | 2,182 |
| Baxter | 665 | 56.31% | 504 | 42.68% | 12 | 1.02% | 161 | 13.63% | 1,181 |
| Benton | 2,348 | 41.42% | 3,248 | 57.29% | 73 | 1.29% | -900 | -15.87% | 5,669 |
| Boone | 1,708 | 52.30% | 1,545 | 47.31% | 13 | 0.40% | 163 | 4.99% | 3,266 |
| Bradley | 1,487 | 76.89% | 447 | 23.11% | 0 | 0.00% | 1,040 | 53.77% | 1,934 |
| Calhoun | 765 | 74.06% | 262 | 25.36% | 6 | 0.58% | 503 | 48.69% | 1,033 |
| Carroll | 1,540 | 46.50% | 1,757 | 53.05% | 15 | 0.45% | -217 | -6.55% | 3,312 |
| Chicot | 1,021 | 69.55% | 445 | 30.31% | 2 | 0.14% | 576 | 39.24% | 1,468 |
| Clark | 1,817 | 66.41% | 913 | 33.37% | 6 | 0.22% | 904 | 33.04% | 2,736 |
| Clay | 1,435 | 52.99% | 1,254 | 46.31% | 19 | 0.70% | 181 | 6.68% | 2,708 |
| Cleburne | 856 | 59.36% | 574 | 39.81% | 12 | 0.83% | 282 | 19.56% | 1,442 |
| Cleveland | 692 | 59.15% | 477 | 40.77% | 1 | 0.09% | 215 | 18.38% | 1,170 |
| Columbia | 1,753 | 73.90% | 617 | 26.01% | 2 | 0.08% | 1,136 | 47.89% | 2,372 |
| Conway | 1,514 | 69.48% | 665 | 30.52% | 0 | 0.00% | 849 | 38.96% | 2,179 |
| Craighead | 2,132 | 51.77% | 1,958 | 47.55% | 28 | 0.68% | 174 | 4.23% | 4,118 |
| Crawford | 1,743 | 52.79% | 1,559 | 47.21% | 0 | 0.00% | 184 | 5.57% | 3,302 |
| Crittenden | 1,635 | 84.32% | 304 | 15.68% | 0 | 0.00% | 1,331 | 68.64% | 1,939 |
| Cross | 1,282 | 79.63% | 324 | 20.12% | 4 | 0.25% | 958 | 59.50% | 1,610 |
| Dallas | 1,030 | 67.01% | 503 | 32.73% | 4 | 0.26% | 527 | 34.29% | 1,537 |
| Desha | 1,082 | 76.47% | 331 | 23.39% | 2 | 0.14% | 751 | 53.07% | 1,415 |
| Drew | 1,452 | 74.20% | 500 | 25.55% | 5 | 0.26% | 952 | 48.65% | 1,957 |
| Faulkner | 2,659 | 72.57% | 992 | 27.07% | 13 | 0.35% | 1,667 | 45.50% | 3,664 |
| Franklin | 1,329 | 62.72% | 774 | 36.53% | 16 | 0.76% | 555 | 26.19% | 2,119 |
| Fulton | 934 | 57.58% | 686 | 42.29% | 2 | 0.12% | 248 | 15.29% | 1,622 |
| Garland | 2,823 | 50.79% | 2,720 | 48.94% | 15 | 0.27% | 103 | 1.85% | 5,558 |
| Grant | 1,045 | 70.28% | 439 | 29.52% | 3 | 0.20% | 606 | 40.75% | 1,487 |
| Greene | 1,426 | 58.20% | 1,011 | 41.27% | 13 | 0.53% | 415 | 16.94% | 2,450 |
| Hempstead | 2,038 | 69.58% | 886 | 30.25% | 5 | 0.17% | 1,152 | 39.33% | 2,929 |
| Hot Spring | 999 | 46.90% | 1,126 | 52.86% | 5 | 0.23% | -127 | -5.96% | 2,130 |
| Howard | 1,055 | 57.74% | 763 | 41.76% | 9 | 0.49% | 292 | 15.98% | 1,827 |
| Independence | 1,511 | 56.63% | 1,150 | 43.10% | 7 | 0.26% | 361 | 13.53% | 2,668 |
| Izard | 902 | 56.30% | 696 | 43.45% | 4 | 0.25% | 206 | 12.86% | 1,602 |
| Jackson | 1,527 | 68.35% | 698 | 31.24% | 9 | 0.40% | 829 | 37.11% | 2,234 |
| Jefferson | 2,611 | 58.67% | 1,830 | 41.12% | 9 | 0.20% | 781 | 17.55% | 4,450 |
| Johnson | 1,292 | 62.30% | 766 | 36.93% | 16 | 0.77% | 526 | 25.36% | 2,074 |
| Lafayette | 991 | 69.45% | 435 | 30.48% | 1 | 0.07% | 556 | 38.96% | 1,427 |
| Lawrence | 1,204 | 60.72% | 774 | 39.03% | 5 | 0.25% | 430 | 21.68% | 1,983 |
| Lee | 1,046 | 87.53% | 149 | 12.47% | 0 | 0.00% | 897 | 75.06% | 1,195 |
| Lincoln | 869 | 85.11% | 151 | 14.79% | 1 | 0.10% | 718 | 70.32% | 1,021 |
| Little River | 916 | 66.62% | 457 | 33.24% | 2 | 0.15% | 459 | 33.38% | 1,375 |
| Logan | 1,967 | 57.31% | 1,455 | 42.40% | 10 | 0.29% | 512 | 14.92% | 3,432 |
| Lonoke | 1,857 | 73.23% | 676 | 26.66% | 3 | 0.12% | 1,181 | 46.57% | 2,536 |
| Madison | 1,717 | 38.16% | 2,760 | 61.33% | 23 | 0.51% | -1,043 | -23.18% | 4,500 |
| Marion | 731 | 62.27% | 436 | 37.14% | 7 | 0.60% | 295 | 25.13% | 1,174 |
| Miller | 1,752 | 60.16% | 1,150 | 39.49% | 10 | 0.34% | 602 | 20.67% | 2,912 |
| Mississippi | 4,451 | 76.75% | 1,324 | 22.83% | 24 | 0.41% | 3,127 | 53.92% | 5,799 |
| Monroe | 851 | 67.38% | 411 | 32.54% | 1 | 0.08% | 440 | 34.84% | 1,263 |
| Montgomery | 726 | 42.33% | 976 | 56.91% | 13 | 0.76% | -250 | -14.58% | 1,715 |
| Nevada | 1,242 | 56.66% | 946 | 43.16% | 4 | 0.18% | 296 | 13.50% | 2,192 |
| Newton | 533 | 28.63% | 1,316 | 70.68% | 13 | 0.70% | -783 | -42.05% | 1,862 |
| Ouachita | 1,582 | 60.08% | 1,051 | 39.92% | 0 | 0.00% | 531 | 20.17% | 2,633 |
| Perry | 636 | 57.25% | 472 | 42.48% | 3 | 0.27% | 164 | 14.76% | 1,111 |
| Phillips | 2,061 | 80.76% | 487 | 19.08% | 4 | 0.16% | 1,574 | 61.68% | 2,552 |
| Pike | 779 | 52.56% | 697 | 47.03% | 6 | 0.40% | 82 | 5.53% | 1,482 |
| Poinsett | 2,324 | 66.06% | 1,182 | 33.60% | 12 | 0.34% | 1,142 | 32.46% | 3,518 |
| Polk | 870 | 45.41% | 1,022 | 53.34% | 24 | 1.25% | -152 | -7.93% | 1,916 |
| Pope | 2,735 | 63.38% | 1,557 | 36.08% | 23 | 0.53% | 1,178 | 27.30% | 4,315 |
| Prairie | 1,000 | 61.69% | 613 | 37.82% | 8 | 0.49% | 387 | 23.87% | 1,621 |
| Pulaski | 9,215 | 65.24% | 4,881 | 34.56% | 29 | 0.21% | 4,334 | 30.68% | 14,125 |
| Randolph | 1,527 | 66.08% | 776 | 33.58% | 8 | 0.35% | 751 | 32.50% | 2,311 |
| St. Francis | 1,376 | 68.73% | 617 | 30.82% | 9 | 0.45% | 759 | 37.91% | 2,002 |
| Saline | 1,268 | 70.72% | 520 | 29.00% | 5 | 0.28% | 748 | 41.72% | 1,793 |
| Scott | 891 | 60.41% | 573 | 38.85% | 11 | 0.75% | 318 | 21.56% | 1,475 |
| Searcy | 606 | 29.62% | 1,425 | 69.65% | 15 | 0.73% | -819 | -40.03% | 2,046 |
| Sebastian | 3,187 | 47.65% | 3,467 | 51.84% | 34 | 0.51% | -280 | -4.19% | 6,688 |
| Sevier | 1,259 | 70.61% | 524 | 29.39% | 0 | 0.00% | 735 | 41.22% | 1,783 |
| Sharp | 808 | 61.68% | 501 | 38.24% | 1 | 0.08% | 307 | 23.44% | 1,310 |
| Stone | 628 | 54.90% | 499 | 43.62% | 17 | 1.49% | 129 | 11.28% | 1,144 |
| Union | 3,128 | 65.88% | 1,612 | 33.95% | 8 | 0.17% | 1,516 | 31.93% | 4,748 |
| Van Buren | 1,539 | 60.66% | 994 | 39.18% | 4 | 0.16% | 545 | 21.48% | 2,537 |
| Washington | 2,395 | 43.02% | 3,132 | 56.26% | 40 | 0.72% | -737 | -13.24% | 5,567 |
| White | 2,299 | 53.73% | 1,957 | 45.73% | 23 | 0.54% | 342 | 7.99% | 4,279 |
| Woodruff | 1,163 | 71.92% | 452 | 27.95% | 2 | 0.12% | 711 | 43.97% | 1,617 |
| Yell | 2,086 | 71.91% | 802 | 27.65% | 13 | 0.45% | 1,284 | 44.26% | 2,901 |
| Totals | 123,140 | 61.06% | 77,789 | 38.57% | 757 | 0.38% | 45,351 | 22.49% | 201,686 |

== Analysis ==
In other Outer South states and in Alabama, powerful local Democrats refused to support Smith. However, in Arkansas, the two leading politicians in the state, Charles Hillman Brough and Joseph Taylor Robinson, had supported the New York Governor for more than a year before his nomination had become official. Robinson was the first major party Vice-Presidential nominee from a former Confederate state since Andrew Johnson in 1864, and was a moderate who had refrained from supporting either Smith or his rival William Gibbs McAdoo during the disastrous 1924 Democratic National Convention. The fact that Robinson denounced Thomas Heflin’s claim that some American Senators (including Heflin himself) were being paid or bribed by the (anti-Catholic) Mexican Government and quarrelled with the Alabama Senator violently over whether religion could be a qualification for office further linked him to Smith even before becoming his running mate.

Senator Robinson's uniquely successful appeals ensured that overwhelmingly white counties in Arkansas remained at least relatively loyal to Smith, although Hoover did win eight counties that went for John W. Davis in 1924. On the whole, Arkansas’ voting was erratic outside of the black-belt counties where the white minority that did vote remained overwhelmingly loyal to Smith. Hoover was the first ever Republican victor in Carroll County, Hot Spring County and Polk County, whilst he was the first Republican since Ulysses S. Grant to carry Sebastian County and Washington County.

== See also ==
- United States presidential elections in Arkansas
