= 1924 United States presidential election in Arkansas =

- November 4, 1924

Nominee	John W. Davis	Calvin Coolidge	Robert M. La Follette
Party	Democratic	Republican	Independent Progressive
Home state	West Virginia	Massachusetts	Wisconsin
Running mate	Charles W. Bryan	Charles G. Dawes	Burton K. Wheeler
Electoral vote	9	0	0
Popular vote	84,790	40,583	13,167
Percentage	61.20%	29.29%	9.50%
County results
Davis
40–50%
50–60%
60–70%
70–80%
80–90%
Coolidge
60–70%
President before election
Calvin Coolidge
Republican
Elected President
Calvin Coolidge
Republican

The 1924 United States presidential election in Arkansas was held on November 4, 1924, as part of the 1924 United States presidential election. State voters chose nine electors, or representatives to the Electoral College, who voted for President and Vice-president.

Except for the Unionist Ozark counties of Newton and Searcy where Republicans controlled local government, Arkansas since the end of Reconstruction had been a classic one-party Democratic “Solid South” state. Disfranchisement during the 1890s of effectively all Blacks and many poor whites had meant that outside those two aberrant counties, the Republican Party was completely moribund and Democratic primaries the only competitive elections. Although the northwest of the state was to develop a strong Socialist Party movement that served as a swing vote in county elections, political repression and internal party divisions diminished that party's strength substantially.

The Democratic Party, under the influence of future federal Senate Minority and Majority Leader Joseph Taylor Robinson and demagogic Governor and Senator Jeff Davis, was to make many familiar progressive changes in railroad regulation and child labor, but under the administration of George W. Donaghey – who saw his administration and Democratic primary candidacy as a fight against the “Davis Machine” – more rapid development occurred, especially in abolishing convict leasing and improving bank regulation.

Race riots and fear of the Bolshevik Revolution spreading and destroying American capitalism ensued when many soldiers returned from World War I, and President Woodrow Wilson responded with the Palmer Raids and a “Red Scare”. Isolationism was sufficiently powerful in Ozark sections of Arkansas that Warren G. Harding, with almost forty percent of the statewide vote in 1920, gained the most support for any GOP candidate since the disfranchisement of Black Americans.

However, with the anti-Democratic opposition split and isolationism cooling, Davis nearly doubled James M. Cox's 1920 margin. Republican Coolidge – though winning a national landslide and carrying every state except the former Confederacy plus culturally and politically allied Oklahoma – carried as Charles Evans Hughes did eight years previously only the two traditional Unionist Ozark counties.

== Results ==
Electoral results
Presidential candidate	Party	Home state	Popular vote		Electoral vote	Running mate		
Presidential candidate	Party	Home state	Count	Percentage	Electoral vote	Vice-presidential candidate	Home state	Electoral vote
John W. Davis	Democrat	West Virginia	84,790	61.20%	9	Charles W. Bryan	Nebraska	9
Calvin Coolidge	Republican	Massachusetts	40,583	29.29%	0	Charles G. Dawes	Illinois	0
Robert M. La Follette	Independent Progressive	Wisconsin	13,167	9.50%	0	Burton K. Wheeler	Montana	0
Total			138,540	100%	9			9
Needed to win					266			266

=== Results by county ===
1924 United States presidential election in Arkansas by county
County	John William Davis Democratic		John Calvin Coolidge Republican		Robert M. La Follette senior Independent Progressive		Margin		Total votes cast
County	#	%	#	%	#	%	#	%	Total votes cast
Arkansas	772	57.19%	488	36.15%	90	6.67%	284	21.04%	1,350
Ashley	1,048	63.55%	506	30.69%	95	5.76%	542	32.87%	1,649
Baxter	640	58.02%	301	27.29%	162	14.69%	339	30.73%	1,103
Benton	2,313	50.58%	1,694	37.04%	566	12.38%	619	13.54%	4,573
Boone	1,350	54.02%	937	37.49%	212	8.48%	413	16.53%	2,499
Bradley	1,002	64.44%	453	29.13%	100	6.43%	549	35.31%	1,555
Calhoun	553	74.23%	150	20.13%	42	5.64%	403	54.09%	745
Carroll	1,421	56.30%	969	38.39%	134	5.31%	452	17.91%	2,524
Chicot	708	67.43%	325	30.95%	17	1.62%	383	36.48%	1,050
Clark	1,223	64.03%	483	25.29%	204	10.68%	740	38.74%	1,910
Clay	1,429	52.54%	1,084	39.85%	207	7.61%	345	12.68%	2,720
Cleburne	569	63.22%	238	26.44%	93	10.33%	331	36.78%	900
Cleveland	613	74.94%	174	21.27%	31	3.79%	439	53.67%	818
Columbia	1,382	76.99%	350	19.50%	63	3.51%	1,032	57.49%	1,795
Conway	909	58.27%	526	33.72%	125	8.01%	383	24.55%	1,560
Craighead	1,711	61.24%	812	29.06%	271	9.70%	899	32.18%	2,794
Crawford	1,445	49.66%	996	34.23%	469	16.12%	449	15.43%	2,910
Crittenden	777	88.90%	77	8.81%	20	2.29%	700	80.09%	874
Cross	625	68.61%	192	21.08%	94	10.32%	433	47.53%	911
Dallas	1,068	71.06%	401	26.68%	34	2.26%	667	44.38%	1,503
Desha	540	55.67%	209	21.55%	221	22.78%	319 (Note: In this county where Coolidge ran third behind La Follette, margin given is Davis vote minus La Follette vote and percentage margin Davis percentage minus La Follette percentage.)	32.89%	970
Drew	1,018	63.51%	563	35.12%	22	1.37%	455	28.38%	1,603
Faulkner	1,436	67.35%	536	25.14%	160	7.50%	900	42.21%	2,132
Franklin	1,188	64.88%	422	23.05%	221	12.07%	766	41.84%	1,831
Fulton	678	67.33%	292	29.00%	37	3.67%	386	38.33%	1,007
Garland	1,501	52.91%	1,064	37.50%	272	9.59%	437	15.40%	2,837
Grant	628	73.19%	133	15.50%	97	11.31%	495	57.69%	858
Greene	1,148	59.33%	456	23.57%	331	17.11%	692	35.76%	1,935
Hempstead	1,459	61.98%	715	30.37%	180	7.65%	744	31.61%	2,354
Hot Spring	793	59.18%	392	29.25%	155	11.57%	401	29.93%	1,340
Howard	954	65.25%	338	23.12%	170	11.63%	616	42.13%	1,462
Independence	1,313	64.30%	534	26.15%	195	9.55%	779	38.15%	2,042
Izard	728	72.80%	241	24.10%	31	3.10%	487	48.70%	1,000
Jackson	1,069	69.37%	392	25.44%	80	5.19%	677	43.93%	1,541
Jefferson	1,950	61.48%	707	22.29%	515	16.24%	1,243	39.19%	3,172
Johnson	1,029	65.46%	311	19.78%	232	14.76%	718	45.67%	1,572
Lafayette	788	64.86%	298	24.53%	129	10.62%	490	40.33%	1,215
Lawrence	689	61.19%	261	23.18%	176	15.63%	428	38.01%	1,126
Lee	1,103	64.77%	596	35.00%	4	0.23%	507	29.77%	1,703
Lincoln	563	76.29%	170	23.04%	5	0.68%	393	53.25%	738
Little River	546	62.90%	276	31.80%	46	5.30%	270	31.11%	868
Logan	1,457	49.85%	937	32.06%	529	18.10%	520	17.79%	2,923
Lonoke	962	71.52%	321	23.87%	62	4.61%	641	47.66%	1,345
Madison	1,335	49.52%	1,263	46.85%	98	3.64%	72	2.67%	2,696
Marion	825	63.07%	282	21.56%	201	15.37%	543	41.51%	1,308
Miller	1,460	63.56%	397	17.28%	440	19.16%	1,020	44.41%	2,297
Mississippi	2,039	72.10%	703	24.86%	86	3.04%	1,336	47.24%	2,828
Monroe	838	66.04%	330	26.00%	101	7.96%	508	40.03%	1,269
Montgomery	431	48.87%	360	40.82%	91	10.32%	71	8.05%	882
Nevada	719	55.69%	386	29.90%	186	14.41%	333	25.79%	1,291
Newton	298	31.57%	578	61.23%	68	7.20%	-280	-29.66%	944
Ouachita	1,318	57.01%	952	41.18%	42	1.82%	366	15.83%	2,312
Perry	386	48.86%	260	32.91%	144	18.23%	126	15.95%	790
Phillips	1,785	77.27%	454	19.65%	71	3.07%	1,331	57.62%	2,310
Pike	732	61.82%	378	31.93%	74	6.25%	354	29.90%	1,184
Poinsett	1,182	68.60%	393	22.81%	148	8.59%	789	45.79%	1,723
Polk	863	54.14%	502	31.49%	229	14.37%	361	22.65%	1,594
Pope	1,581	70.08%	479	21.23%	196	8.69%	1,102	48.85%	2,256
Prairie	730	61.81%	386	32.68%	65	5.50%	344	29.13%	1,181
Pulaski	5,706	59.30%	2,729	28.36%	1,187	12.34%	2,977	30.94%	9,622
Randolph	772	63.91%	389	32.20%	47	3.89%	383	31.71%	1,208
St. Francis	972	66.26%	433	29.52%	62	4.23%	539	36.74%	1,467
Saline	770	72.99%	144	13.65%	141	13.36%	626	59.34%	1,055
Scott	607	53.81%	375	33.24%	146	12.94%	232	20.57%	1,128
Searcy	415	31.42%	797	60.33%	109	8.25%	-382	-28.92%	1,321
Sebastian	3,148	52.54%	1,985	33.13%	859	14.34%	1,163	19.41%	5,992
Sevier	931	63.03%	270	18.28%	276	18.69%	655	44.35%	1,477
Sharp	729	73.27%	210	21.11%	56	5.63%	519	52.16%	995
Stone	386	59.38%	210	32.31%	54	8.31%	176	27.08%	650
Union	1,967	73.59%	450	16.84%	256	9.58%	1,517	56.75%	2,673
Van Buren	922	63.85%	435	30.12%	87	6.02%	487	33.73%	1,444
Washington	2,281	55.87%	1,466	35.90%	336	8.23%	815	19.96%	4,083
White	1,488	60.69%	679	27.69%	285	11.62%	809	32.99%	2,452
Woodruff	762	72.78%	254	24.26%	31	2.96%	508	48.52%	1,047
Yell	1,314	75.34%	334	19.15%	96	5.50%	980	56.19%	1,744
Totals	84,790	61.20%	40,583	29.29%	13,167	9.50%	44,207	31.91%	138,540

== See also ==
- United States presidential elections in Arkansas
