= 1916 United States presidential election in Arkansas =

- November 7, 1916

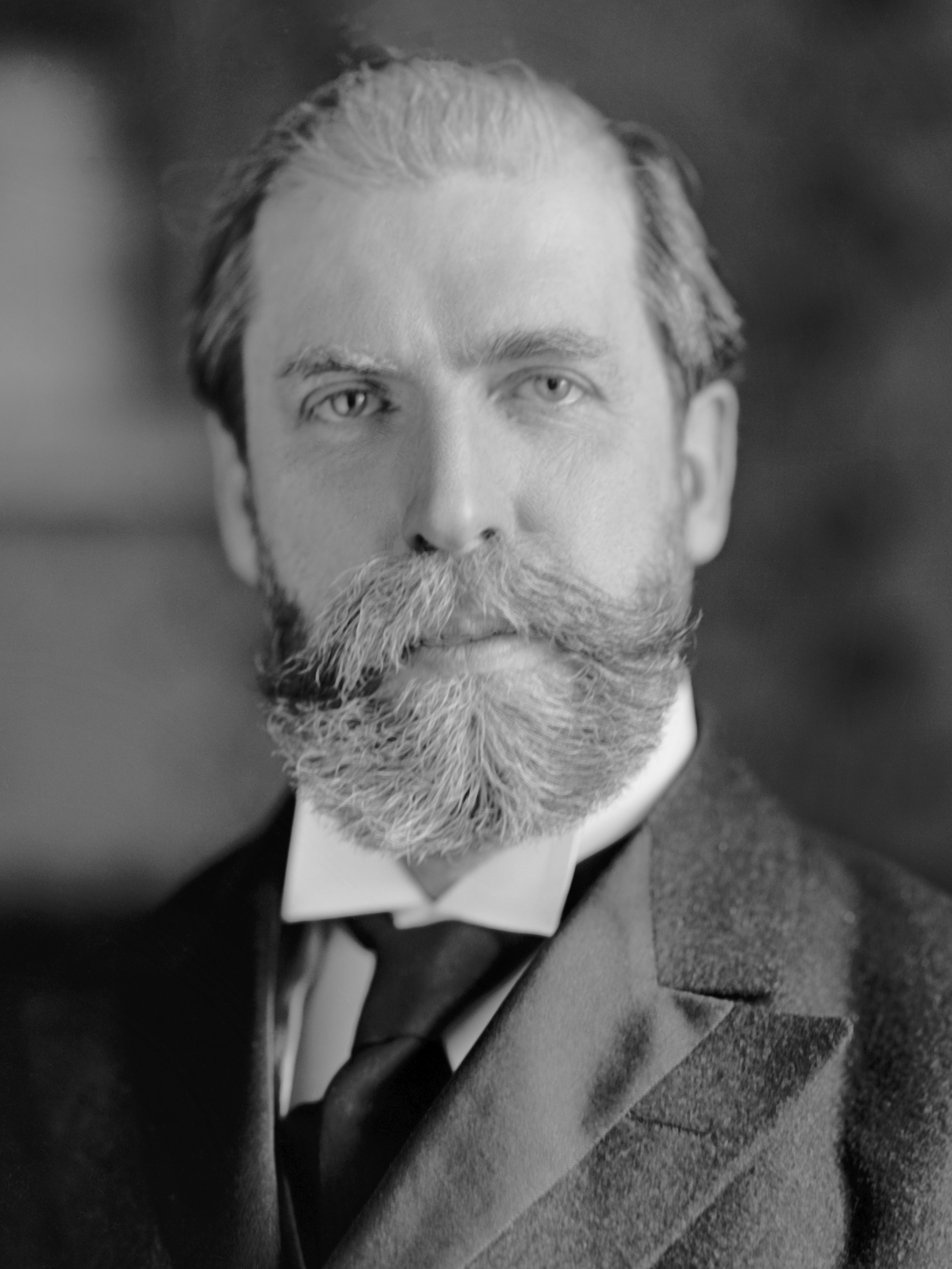
Nominee	Woodrow Wilson	Charles Evans Hughes
Party	Democratic	Republican
Home state	New Jersey	New York
Running mate	Thomas R. Marshall	Charles W. Fairbanks
Electoral vote	9	0
Popular vote	112,189	47,153
Percentage	66.64%	28.01%
County results
Wilson
50–60%
60–70%
70–80%
80–90%
Hughes
50–60%
President before election
Woodrow Wilson
Democratic
Elected President
Woodrow Wilson
Democratic

The 1916 United States presidential election in Arkansas took place on November 7, 1916, as part of the 1916 United States presidential election. State voters chose nine representatives, or electors, to the Electoral College, who voted for president and vice president.

Except for the Unionist Ozark counties of Newton and Searcy where Republicans controlled local government, Arkansas since the end of Reconstruction had been a classic one-party Democratic “Solid South” state. Disfranchisement during the 1890s of effectively all black people and most poor white people had meant that outside those two aberrant counties, the Republican Party was completely moribund and Democratic primaries the only competitive elections. Although the northwest of the state was to develop a strong Socialist Party movement that served as a swing vote in county elections, political repression and internal party divisions diminished that party's strength substantially.

The Democratic Party, under the influence of future federal Senate Minority and Majority Leader Joseph Taylor Robinson and demagogic Governor and Senator Jeff Davis, was to make many familiar progressive changes in railroad regulation and child labor, but under the administration of George W. Donaghey – who saw his administration and Democratic primary candidacy as a fight against the “Davis Machine” – more rapid development occurred, especially in abolishing convict leasing and improving bank regulation.

== Results ==
Electoral results
Presidential candidate	Party	Home state	Popular vote		Electoral vote	Running mate		
Presidential candidate	Party	Home state	Count	Percentage	Electoral vote	Vice-presidential candidate	Home state	Electoral vote
Woodrow Wilson	Democrat	New Jersey	112,189	66.64%	9	Thomas R. Marshall	Indiana	9
Charles Evans Hughes	Republican	New York	47,153	28.01%	0	Charles W. Fairbanks	Indiana	0
Allan L. Benson	Socialist	New York	7,098	4.22%	0	George Ross Kirkpatrick	New Jersey	0
Frank Hanly	Prohibition	Indiana	1,914	1.14%	0	Ira Landrith	Tennessee	0
Total			168,354	100%	9			9
Needed to win					266			266

=== Results by county ===
1916 United States presidential election in Arkansas by county
County	Thomas Woodrow Wilson Democratic		Charles Evans Hughes Republican		Various candidates Other parties		Margin		Total votes cast
County	#	%	#	%	#	%	#	%	Total votes cast
Arkansas	1,119	62.44%	613	34.21%	60	3.35%	506	28.24%	1,792
Ashley	1,519	74.94%	463	22.84%	45	2.22%	1,056	52.43%	2,027
Baxter	914	68.88%	318	23.96%	95	7.16%	596	44.91%	1,327
Benton	3,105	66.49%	1,292	27.67%	273	5.85%	1,813	38.82%	4,670
Boone	1,411	66.56%	598	28.21%	111	5.24%	813	38.35%	2,120
Bradley	1,159	73.40%	314	19.89%	106	6.71%	845	53.51%	1,579
Calhoun	914	72.25%	275	21.74%	76	6.01%	639	50.51%	1,265
Carroll	1,512	56.71%	1,034	38.78%	120	4.50%	478	17.93%	2,666
Chicot	560	52.43%	472	44.19%	36	3.37%	88	8.24%	1,068
Clark	1,975	69.35%	824	28.93%	49	1.72%	1,151	40.41%	2,848
Clay	1,949	62.99%	972	31.42%	173	5.59%	977	31.58%	3,094
Cleburne	865	67.00%	271	20.99%	155	12.01%	594	46.01%	1,291
Cleveland	1,128	81.74%	230	16.67%	22	1.59%	898	65.07%	1,380
Columbia	2,074	73.44%	720	25.50%	30	1.06%	1,354	47.95%	2,824
Conway	1,400	55.69%	1,030	40.97%	84	3.34%	370	14.72%	2,514
Craighead	1,957	73.02%	543	20.26%	180	6.72%	1,414	52.76%	2,680
Crawford	1,622	55.53%	1,195	40.91%	104	3.56%	427	14.62%	2,921
Crittenden	562	84.89%	91	13.75%	9	1.36%	471	71.15%	662
Cross	927	73.98%	252	20.11%	74	5.91%	675	53.87%	1,253
Dallas	1,150	66.05%	524	30.10%	67	3.85%	626	35.96%	1,741
Desha	960	71.11%	369	27.33%	21	1.56%	591	43.78%	1,350
Drew	1,627	64.79%	836	33.29%	48	1.91%	791	31.50%	2,511
Faulkner	2,031	66.94%	817	26.93%	186	6.13%	1,214	40.01%	3,034
Franklin	1,679	69.35%	586	24.20%	156	6.44%	1,093	45.15%	2,421
Fulton	1,094	67.36%	388	23.89%	142	8.74%	706	43.47%	1,624
Garland	1,670	57.57%	1,055	36.37%	176	6.07%	615	21.20%	2,901
Grant	957	80.96%	188	15.91%	37	3.13%	769	65.06%	1,182
Greene	2,292	78.01%	529	18.01%	117	3.98%	1,763	60.01%	2,938
Hempstead	2,089	59.40%	1,225	34.83%	203	5.77%	864	24.57%	3,517
Hot Spring	1,429	66.56%	625	29.11%	93	4.33%	804	37.45%	2,147
Howard	1,316	67.66%	545	28.02%	84	4.32%	771	39.64%	1,945
Independence	1,987	68.35%	762	26.21%	158	5.44%	1,225	42.14%	2,907
Izard	1,267	79.74%	285	17.94%	37	2.33%	982	61.80%	1,589
Jackson	1,351	66.91%	473	23.43%	195	9.66%	878	43.49%	2,019
Jefferson	2,173	68.18%	921	28.90%	93	2.92%	1,252	39.28%	3,187
Johnson	1,479	65.91%	573	25.53%	192	8.56%	906	40.37%	2,244
Lafayette	891	69.77%	368	28.82%	18	1.41%	523	40.96%	1,277
Lawrence	1,706	81.05%	298	14.16%	101	4.80%	1,408	66.89%	2,105
Lee	848	70.02%	353	29.15%	10	0.83%	495	40.88%	1,211
Lincoln	887	65.70%	448	33.19%	15	1.11%	439	32.52%	1,350
Little River	843	65.50%	363	28.21%	81	6.29%	480	37.30%	1,287
Logan	2,015	59.88%	1,185	35.22%	165	4.90%	830	24.67%	3,365
Lonoke	2,178	77.87%	515	18.41%	104	3.72%	1,663	59.46%	2,797
Madison	1,456	50.38%	1,332	46.09%	102	3.53%	124	4.29%	2,890
Marion	781	63.34%	274	22.22%	178	14.44%	507	41.12%	1,233
Miller	1,418	73.36%	402	20.80%	113	5.85%	1,016	52.56%	1,933
Mississippi	1,249	68.89%	417	23.00%	147	8.11%	832	45.89%	1,813
Monroe	741	57.35%	508	39.32%	43	3.33%	233	18.03%	1,292
Montgomery	939	58.91%	432	27.10%	223	13.99%	507	31.81%	1,594
Nevada	1,376	63.62%	651	30.10%	136	6.29%	725	33.52%	2,163
Newton	550	41.23%	675	50.60%	109	8.17%	-125	-9.37%	1,334
Ouachita	1,390	58.01%	970	40.48%	36	1.50%	420	17.53%	2,396
Perry	973	65.04%	435	29.08%	88	5.88%	538	35.96%	1,496
Phillips	1,466	71.90%	552	27.07%	21	1.03%	914	44.83%	2,039
Pike	1,178	64.16%	605	32.95%	53	2.89%	573	31.21%	1,836
Poinsett	1,174	67.90%	511	29.55%	44	2.54%	663	38.35%	1,729
Polk	1,242	66.03%	443	23.55%	196	10.42%	799	42.48%	1,881
Pope	2,145	70.37%	783	25.69%	120	3.94%	1,362	44.69%	3,048
Prairie	1,061	59.27%	654	36.54%	75	4.19%	407	22.74%	1,790
Pulaski	6,008	65.26%	2,593	28.17%	605	6.57%	3,415	37.10%	9,206
Randolph	1,553	74.66%	458	22.02%	69	3.32%	1,095	52.64%	2,080
St. Francis	960	67.56%	395	27.80%	66	4.64%	565	39.76%	1,421
Saline	1,567	81.11%	231	11.96%	134	6.94%	1,336	69.15%	1,932
Scott	1,365	68.15%	487	24.31%	151	7.54%	878	43.83%	2,003
Searcy	629	37.62%	919	54.96%	124	7.42%	-290	-17.34%	1,672
Sebastian	3,719	68.14%	1,366	25.03%	373	6.83%	2,353	43.11%	5,458
Sevier	1,265	73.38%	240	13.92%	219	12.70%	1,025	59.45%	1,724
Sharp	972	73.58%	251	19.00%	98	7.42%	721	54.58%	1,321
Stone	682	64.40%	298	28.14%	79	7.46%	384	36.26%	1,059
Union	1,691	77.21%	273	12.47%	226	10.32%	1,418	64.75%	2,190
Van Buren	1,272	60.26%	742	35.15%	97	4.59%	530	25.11%	2,111
Washington	2,922	61.23%	1,625	34.05%	225	4.72%	1,297	27.18%	4,772
White	2,820	74.27%	673	17.72%	304	8.01%	2,147	56.54%	3,797
Woodruff	935	66.36%	438	31.09%	36	2.56%	497	35.27%	1,409
Yell	2,099	67.67%	782	25.21%	221	7.12%	1,317	42.46%	3,102
Totals	112,189	66.64%	47,153	28.01%	8,999	5.35%	65,036	38.63%	168,341

== See also ==
- United States presidential elections in Arkansas
