= 1920 United States presidential election in Arkansas =

- November 2, 1920

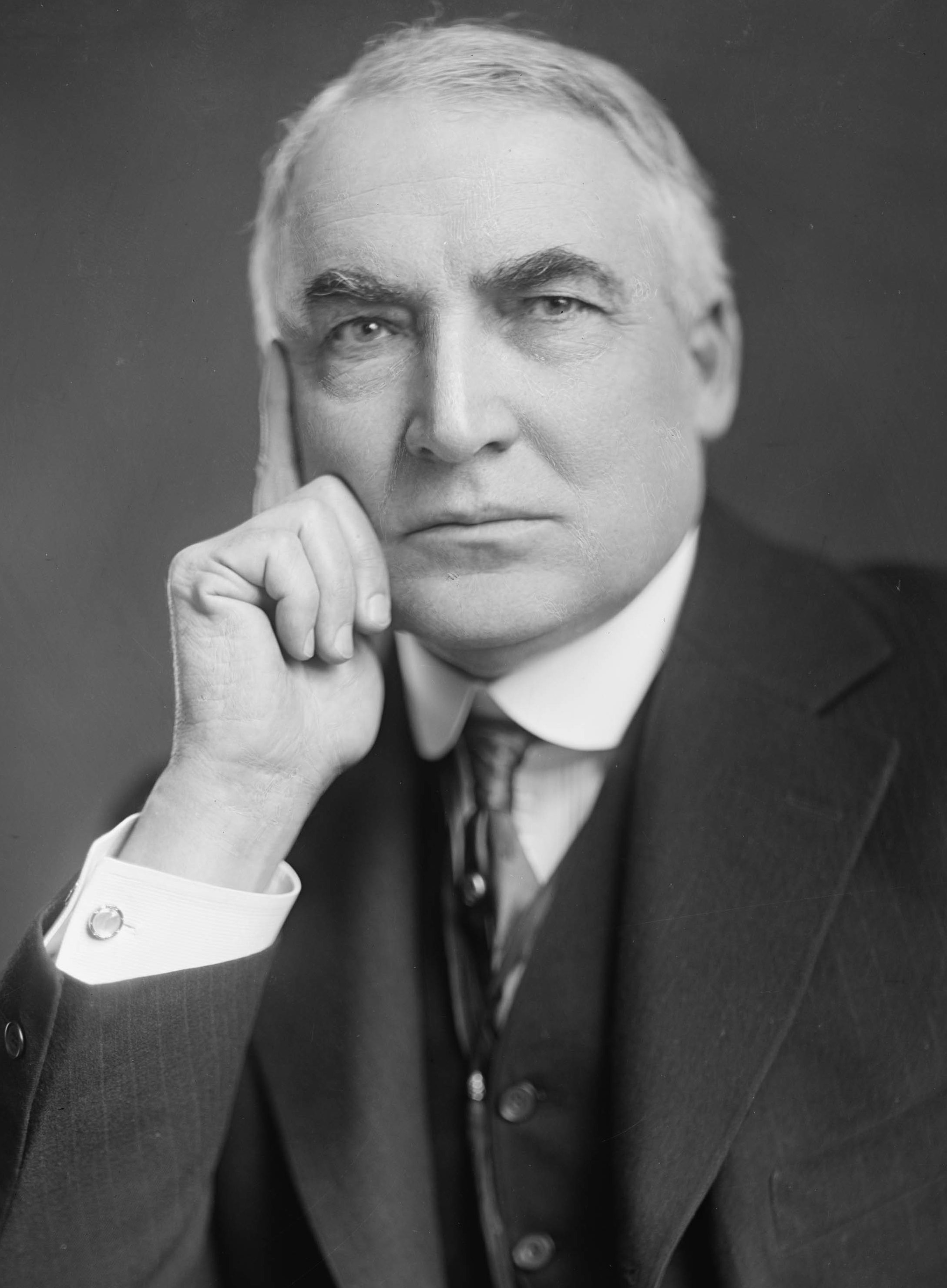
Nominee	James M. Cox	Warren G. Harding
Party	Democratic	Republican
Home state	Ohio	Ohio
Running mate	Franklin D. Roosevelt	Calvin Coolidge
Electoral vote	9	0
Popular vote	106,682	71,948
Percentage	58.05%	39.15%
County results
Cox
40–50%
50–60%
60–70%
70–80%
80–90%
Harding
40–50%
50–60%
60–70%
70–80%
President before election
Woodrow Wilson
Democratic
Elected President
Warren G. Harding
Republican

The 1920 United States presidential election in Arkansas took place on November 2, 1920, as part of the 1920 United States presidential election in which all 48 states participated. State voters chose nine electors to represent them in the Electoral College via a popular vote pitting Democratic nominee James M. Cox and his running mate, Assistant Secretary of the Navy Franklin Roosevelt, against Republican challenger U.S. Senator Warren G. Harding and his running mate, Governor Calvin Coolidge.

Except for the Unionist Ozark counties of Newton and Searcy where Republicans controlled local government, Arkansas since the end of Reconstruction had been a classic one-party Democratic “Solid South” state. Disfranchisement during the 1890s of effectively all blacks and most poor whites had meant that outside those two aberrant counties, the Republican Party was completely moribund and Democratic primaries the only competitive elections. Although the northwest of the state was to develop a strong Socialist Party movement that served as a swing vote in county elections, political repression and internal party divisions diminished that party's strength substantially.

The Democratic Party, under the influence of future federal Senate Minority and Majority Leader Joseph Taylor Robinson and demagogic Governor and Senator Jeff Davis, was to make many familiar progressive changes in railroad regulation and child labor, but under the administration of George W. Donaghey – who saw his administration and Democratic primary candidacy as a fight against the “Davis Machine” – more rapid development occurred, especially in abolishing convict leasing and improving bank regulation.

The aftermath of World War I, however, made for a temporary turn in Arkansas voter allegiances. The League of Nations was to be spurned in the isolationist and fundamentalist Ozark region, and outgoing President Woodrow Wilson was thus stigmatised for his advocacy of that organization. New Democratic nominee James M. Cox also supported American participation in the League, whereas his rival Warren Harding was largely opposed to the League and was helped in the South by racial and labor unrest elsewhere in the country.

Despite this, the solid Democratic majority of Arkansas was always conceded by polls across the nation at the end of October, even as the possibility of Harding breaking the “Solid South” was seen in Tennessee and even North Carolina. In culmination, Cox won the election in Arkansas with 58.05 percent of the vote; Harding received 39.15 percent of the vote and the only other candidate on the ballot, imprisoned Socialist Eugene Debs received the remaining 2.80 percent. Harding's result was nonetheless a major improvement upon the mere 28 percent won by Charles Evans Hughes in 1916, and rivaled any Republican performance in the state since the advent of the poll tax, although Theodore Roosevelt in 1904 had done marginally better. Harding was the first Republican to ever carry Van Buren County, the first to carry Logan County since Ulysses S. Grant in 1872, and the first Republican since Benjamin Harrison to carry Arkansas County and Lincoln County.

== Results ==
1920 United States presidential election in Arkansas
Party	Candidate	Running mate	Votes	Percentage	Electoral votes
Democratic	James M. Cox	Franklin D. Roosevelt	106,682	58.05%	9
Republican	Warren G. Harding	Calvin Coolidge	71,948	39.15%	0
Socialist	Eugene V. Debs	Seymour Stedman	5,141	2.80%	0
Totals			183,637	100.00%	9

=== Results by county ===
1920 United States presidential election in Arkansas by county
County	James Middleton Cox Democratic		Warren Gamaliel Harding Republican		Eugene Victor Debs Socialist		Margin		Total votes cast
County	#	%	#	%	#	%	#	%	Total votes cast
Arkansas	1,156	48.43%	1,199	50.23%	32	1.34%	-43	-1.80%	2,387
Ashley	1,312	63.41%	725	35.04%	32	1.55%	587	28.37%	2,069
Baxter	707	56.07%	484	38.38%	70	5.55%	223	17.69%	1,261
Benton	2,838	58.28%	1,916	39.34%	116	2.38%	922	18.94%	4,870
Boone	1,106	60.87%	647	35.61%	64	3.52%	459	25.26%	1,817
Bradley	1,146	65.22%	540	30.73%	71	4.04%	606	34.49%	1,757
Calhoun	736	64.62%	337	29.59%	66	5.79%	399	35.03%	1,139
Carroll	1,344	48.93%	1,338	48.71%	65	2.37%	6	0.22%	2,747
Chicot	887	64.00%	489	35.28%	10	0.72%	398	28.72%	1,386
Clark	1,507	59.19%	1,020	40.06%	19	0.75%	487	19.13%	2,546
Clay	1,775	50.83%	1,536	43.99%	181	5.18%	239	6.84%	3,492
Cleburne	678	56.22%	459	38.06%	69	5.72%	219	18.16%	1,206
Cleveland	809	62.28%	475	36.57%	15	1.15%	334	25.71%	1,299
Columbia	2,052	70.13%	857	29.29%	17	0.58%	1,195	40.84%	2,926
Conway	1,791	58.32%	1,243	40.48%	37	1.20%	548	17.84%	3,071
Craighead	2,079	64.15%	1,058	32.64%	104	3.21%	1,021	31.51%	3,241
Crawford	1,861	54.77%	1,497	44.06%	40	1.18%	364	10.71%	3,398
Crittenden	905	83.80%	167	15.46%	8	0.74%	738	68.34%	1,080
Cross	845	62.87%	457	34.00%	42	3.13%	388	28.87%	1,344
Dallas	1,140	62.60%	659	36.19%	22	1.21%	481	26.41%	1,821
Desha	931	70.85%	360	27.40%	23	1.75%	571	43.45%	1,314
Drew	1,397	63.56%	773	35.17%	28	1.27%	624	28.39%	2,198
Faulkner	1,971	60.63%	1,148	35.31%	132	4.06%	823	25.32%	3,251
Franklin	1,502	62.79%	769	32.15%	121	5.06%	733	30.64%	2,392
Fulton	763	59.47%	502	39.13%	18	1.40%	261	20.34%	1,283
Garland	1,670	57.57%	1,055	36.37%	176	6.07%	615	21.20%	2,901
Grant	619	71.56%	230	26.59%	16	1.85%	389	44.97%	865
Greene	1,865	61.82%	1,072	35.53%	80	2.65%	793	26.29%	3,017
Hempstead	2,239	55.72%	1,754	43.65%	25	0.62%	485	12.07%	4,018
Hot Spring	1,061	52.42%	910	44.96%	53	2.62%	151	7.46%	2,024
Howard	1,452	54.02%	1,208	44.94%	28	1.04%	244	9.08%	2,688
Independence	1,546	57.05%	1,077	39.74%	87	3.21%	469	17.31%	2,710
Izard	841	62.20%	485	35.87%	26	1.92%	356	26.33%	1,352
Jackson	1,575	56.17%	1,131	40.34%	98	3.50%	444	15.83%	2,804
Jefferson	2,670	70.58%	1,048	27.70%	65	1.72%	1,622	42.88%	3,783
Johnson	1,579	57.31%	996	36.15%	180	6.53%	583	21.16%	2,755
Lafayette	954	65.61%	500	34.39%	0	0.00%	454	31.22%	1,454
Lawrence	1,686	69.27%	699	28.72%	49	2.01%	987	40.55%	2,434
Lee	1,108	73.87%	354	23.60%	38	2.53%	754	50.27%	1,500
Lincoln	888	47.11%	988	52.41%	9	0.48%	-100	-5.30%	1,885
Little River	853	56.08%	618	40.63%	50	3.29%	235	15.45%	1,521
Logan	1,840	49.58%	1,871	50.42%	0	0.00%	-31	-0.84%	3,711
Lonoke	1,711	68.96%	697	28.09%	73	2.94%	1,014	40.87%	2,481
Madison	1,463	45.29%	1,715	53.10%	52	1.61%	-252	-7.81%	3,230
Marion	744	57.36%	371	28.60%	182	14.03%	373	28.76%	1,297
Miller	1,545	62.65%	836	33.90%	85	3.45%	709	28.75%	2,466
Mississippi	1,809	60.70%	1,050	35.23%	121	4.06%	759	25.47%	2,980
Monroe	834	46.96%	912	51.35%	30	1.69%	-78	-4.39%	1,776
Montgomery	430	38.43%	615	54.96%	74	6.61%	-185	-16.53%	1,119
Nevada	1,220	47.82%	1,292	50.65%	39	1.53%	-72	-2.83%	2,551
Newton	486	35.37%	828	60.26%	60	4.37%	-342	-24.89%	1,374
Ouachita	1,307	52.83%	1,141	46.12%	26	1.05%	166	6.71%	2,474
Perry	738	53.99%	592	43.31%	37	2.71%	146	10.68%	1,367
Phillips	1,965	69.14%	868	30.54%	9	0.32%	1,097	38.60%	2,842
Pike	849	46.73%	921	50.69%	47	2.59%	-72	-3.96%	1,817
Poinsett	1,201	62.49%	633	32.93%	88	4.58%	568	29.56%	1,922
Polk	1,208	47.65%	1,173	46.27%	154	6.07%	35	1.38%	2,535
Pope	2,082	63.65%	1,120	34.24%	69	2.11%	962	29.41%	3,271
Prairie	962	52.14%	842	45.64%	41	2.22%	120	6.50%	1,845
Pulaski	6,506	62.76%	3,711	35.80%	150	1.45%	2,795	26.96%	10,367
Randolph	1,412	67.50%	652	31.17%	28	1.34%	760	36.33%	2,092
St. Francis	1,252	56.60%	903	40.82%	57	2.58%	349	15.78%	2,212
Saline	1,206	72.22%	403	24.13%	61	3.65%	803	48.09%	1,670
Scott	771	48.13%	751	46.88%	80	4.99%	20	1.25%	1,602
Searcy	594	33.75%	1,070	60.80%	96	5.45%	-476	-27.05%	1,760
Sebastian	3,852	50.78%	3,492	46.03%	242	3.19%	360	4.75%	7,586
Sevier	1,236	61.89%	599	29.99%	162	8.11%	637	31.90%	1,997
Sharp	995	65.72%	400	26.42%	119	7.86%	595	39.30%	1,514
Stone	516	55.19%	367	39.25%	52	5.56%	149	15.94%	935
Union	1,967	78.06%	493	19.56%	60	2.38%	1,474	58.50%	2,520
Van Buren	440	23.13%	1,388	72.98%	74	3.89%	-948	-49.85%	1,902
Washington	2,637	54.05%	2,118	43.41%	124	2.54%	519	10.64%	4,879
White	2,086	58.06%	1,359	37.82%	148	4.12%	727	20.24%	3,593
Woodruff	1,049	51.62%	943	46.41%	40	1.97%	106	5.21%	2,032
Yell	1,925	63.20%	1,042	34.21%	79	2.59%	883	28.99%	3,046
Totals	106,682	58.05%	71,948	39.15%	5,141	2.80%	34,734	18.90%	183,771

== See also ==
- United States presidential elections in Arkansas
