= Elections in Arkansas =

United States presidential election results for Arkansas
Year	Republican / Whig		Democratic		Third party(ies)	
Year	No.	%	No.	%	No.	%
1836	1,334	35.92%	2,380	64.08%	0	0.00%
1840	5,160	43.58%	6,679	56.42%	0	0.00%
1844	5,604	36.99%	9,546	63.01%	0	0.00%
1848	7,587	44.93%	9,301	55.07%	0	0.00%
1852	7,404	37.82%	12,173	62.18%	0	0.00%
1856	0	0.00%	21,910	67.12%	10,732	32.88%
1860	0	0.00%	5,357	9.89%	48,795	90.11%
1868	22,112	53.68%	19,078	46.32%	0	0.00%
1872	41,373	52.17%	37,927	47.83%	0	0.00%
1876	38,649	39.87%	58,086	59.92%	211	0.22%
1880	41,661	38.66%	60,489	56.13%	5,622	5.22%
1884	51,198	40.70%	72,734	57.83%	1,847	1.47%
1888	59,752	38.04%	86,062	54.80%	11,244	7.16%
1892	47,072	31.78%	87,834	59.30%	13,211	8.92%
1896	37,512	25.12%	110,103	73.72%	1,732	1.16%
1900	44,800	35.04%	81,142	63.46%	1,924	1.50%
1904	46,860	40.25%	64,434	55.35%	5,127	4.40%
1908	56,624	37.30%	87,015	57.31%	8,183	5.39%
1912	25,585	20.45%	68,814	55.01%	30,705	24.54%
1916	48,879	28.73%	112,211	65.97%	9,014	5.30%
1920	71,117	38.73%	107,409	58.49%	5,111	2.78%
1924	40,564	29.28%	84,795	61.21%	13,173	9.51%
1928	77,751	39.33%	119,196	60.29%	746	0.38%
1932	28,467	12.91%	189,602	85.96%	2,493	1.13%
1936	32,039	17.86%	146,765	81.80%	619	0.34%
1940	42,121	20.98%	158,622	79.02%	0	0.00%
1944	63,551	29.84%	148,965	69.95%	438	0.21%
1948	50,959	21.02%	149,659	61.72%	41,857	17.26%
1952	177,155	43.76%	226,300	55.90%	1,345	0.33%
1956	186,287	45.82%	213,277	52.46%	7,008	1.72%
1960	184,508	43.06%	215,049	50.19%	28,952	6.76%
1964	243,264	43.41%	314,197	56.06%	2,965	0.53%
1968	189,062	31.01%	184,901	30.33%	235,627	38.65%
1972	445,751	68.82%	198,899	30.71%	3,016	0.47%
1976	268,753	34.93%	499,614	64.94%	1,029	0.13%
1980	403,164	48.13%	398,041	47.52%	36,377	4.34%
1984	534,774	60.47%	338,646	38.29%	10,986	1.24%
1988	466,578	56.37%	349,237	42.19%	11,923	1.44%
1992	337,324	35.48%	505,823	53.21%	107,506	11.31%
1996	325,416	36.80%	475,171	53.74%	83,675	9.46%
2000	472,940	51.31%	422,768	45.86%	26,073	2.83%
2004	572,898	54.31%	469,953	44.55%	12,094	1.15%
2008	638,017	58.72%	422,310	38.86%	26,290	2.42%
2012	647,744	60.57%	394,409	36.88%	27,315	2.55%
2016	684,872	60.57%	380,494	33.65%	65,310	5.78%
2020	760,647	62.40%	423,932	34.78%	34,490	2.83%
2024	759,241	64.20%	396,905	33.56%	26,530	2.24%

The number of elections in Arkansas varies by year, but usually municipal elections occur every year, plus primary and general elections for federal and state offices occur during even-numbered years.

The state was historically part of the Solid South, and was a one-party state dominated by Democrats. Arkansas was the only state in the nation not carried by Republicans at least once between 1876 and 1968, although it voted for segregationist George Wallace in 1968. It was the only Deep South state carried by Lyndon Johnson in 1964, just following the passage of the Civil Rights Act, however, Democratic support did weaken after this. The state voted Republican for the first time in 100 years in 1972, and became a swing state, voting for the national winner in every election from 1972 to 2004. In 2008, the state continued in rightward turn in the 21st century, when Democrat Barack Obama became the first Democrat to win the presidency without carrying the state. Democrats lost control of all statewide and congressional offices by 2014 and lost the state legislature in 2012.

In a 2020 study, Arkansas was ranked as the 9th hardest state for citizens to vote in.

== Elections ==
=== Gubernatorial ===
- 2022 Arkansas gubernatorial election
- 2018 Arkansas gubernatorial election
- 2014 Arkansas gubernatorial election
- 2010 Arkansas gubernatorial election
- 2006 Arkansas gubernatorial election
- 2002 Arkansas gubernatorial election

=== Senatorial ===
- 2022 United States Senate election in Arkansas
- 2020 United States Senate election in Arkansas
- 2016 United States Senate election in Arkansas
- 2014 United States Senate election in Arkansas
- 2010 United States Senate election in Arkansas

== See also ==
- United States presidential elections in Arkansas
- 2024 Arkansas elections
- Women's suffrage in Arkansas
