= United States presidential elections in Arkansas =

Presidential elections in Arkansas
- Number of elections: 47
- Voted Democratic: 32
- Voted Republican: 13
- Voted other: 2 (Note: The Southern Democratic Party candidate John C. Breckinridge in 1860 and the American Independent Party candidate George Wallace in 1968)
- Voted for winning candidate: 28
- Voted for losing candidate: 19

Arkansas is a state in the South Central region of the United States. Since its admission to the Union in June 1836, it has participated in 46 United States presidential elections. In the realigning 1860 election, Arkansas was one of the ten slave states that did not provide ballot access to the Republican nominee, Abraham Lincoln. Subsequently, John C. Breckinridge won the state by a comfortable margin, becoming the first third party candidate to win Arkansas. Soon after this election, Arkansas seceded from the Union and joined the Confederacy. Following the secession, Arkansas did not participate in the 1864 presidential election. After the Civil War, Arkansas was readmitted to the Union in 1868. In the 1872 election, all six of Arkansas's electoral votes were invalidated due to various irregularities including allegations of electoral fraud.

Until 1964, Arkansas was considered a stronghold state for the Democratic Party, which usually carried the state by huge margins; however, recent political realignment has led to the dominance of the Republican Party. In the 1968 presidential election, American Independent Party candidate George Wallace became the second third-party presidential candidate to win Arkansas. Arkansas was the only state in the 1992 presidential election to be won by a majority of the popular vote; Bill Clinton, its governor at the time, won Arkansas with 53.21 percent of the vote. Since Clinton won re-election in 1996, however, the state has voted consistently for the Republican Party.

== Presidential elections ==
Key for parties
American Independent Party – (AI)
Constitution Party – (C)
Constitutional Union Party – (CU)
Democratic Party – (D)
Dixiecrat Party – (DI)
Farmer–Labor Party – (FL)
Green Party – (G)
Greenback Party – (GB)
Independent candidate – (I)
Know Nothing Party – (KN)
Labor Party (19th century) – (L)
Liberal Republican Party – (LR)
Libertarian Party – (LI)
National States' Rights Party – (NSR)
Populist Party – (PO)
Populist Party (1984) – (PO-1984)
Progressive Party (1912) – (PR-1912)
Progressive Party (1924) – (PR-1924)
Prohibition Party – (PRO)
Reform Party – (RE)
Republican Party – (R)
Socialist Party of America – (S)
Southern Democratic Party – (SD)
Whig Party – (W)
Note – A double dagger (‡) indicates the national winner.

=== 1836 to 1856 ===
Presidential elections in Arkansas from 1836 to 1856
| Year | Winner | | | Runner-up | | | EV | Ref. |
| Year | Candidate | Votes | % | Candidate | Votes | % | EV | Ref. |
|---|---|---|---|---|---|---|---|---|
| 1836 | Martin Van Buren (D)‡ | 2,380 | 64.08% | Hugh Lawson White (W) | 1,334 | 35.92% | 3 | |
| 1840 | Martin Van Buren (D) | 6,679 | 56.42% | William Henry Harrison (W)‡ | 5,160 | 43.58% | 3 | |
| 1844 | James K. Polk (D)‡ | 9,546 | 63.01% | Henry Clay (W) | 5,604 | 36.99% | 3 | |
| 1848 | Lewis Cass (D) | 9,301 | 55.07% | Zachary Taylor (W)‡ | 7,587 | 44.93% | 3 | |
| 1852 | Franklin Pierce (D)‡ | 12,173 | 62.18% | Winfield Scott (W) | 7,404 | 37.82% | 4 | |
| 1856 | James Buchanan (D)‡ | 21,910 | 67.12% | Millard Fillmore (KN) | 10,732 | 32.88% | 4 | |

=== 1860 and 1864 ===
The election of 1860 was a complex realigning election in which the breakdown of the previous two-party alignment culminated in four parties each competing for influence in different parts of the country. The result of the election, with the victory of an ardent opponent of slavery, spurred the secession of eleven states and brought about the American Civil War.

1860 Presidential election in Arkansas
| Year | Winner | | Runner-up | | Runner-up | | Runner-up | | EV | Ref. |
| Year | Candidate | Votes (%) | Candidate | Votes (%) | Candidate | Votes (%) | Candidate | Votes (%) | EV | Ref. |
|---|---|---|---|---|---|---|---|---|---|---|
| 1860 | John C. Breckinridge (SD) | 28,732 (53.06%) | John Bell (CU) | 20,063 (37.05%) | Stephen A. Douglas (D) | 5,357 (9.89%) | Abraham Lincoln (R)‡ | – (Note: Not on ballot) | 4 | |
| 1864 | Election was not conducted in Arkansas as it seceded from the Union to join the Confederacy. | | | | | | | | | |

=== 1868 to present ===
Presidential elections in Arkansas from 1864 to present
| Year | Winner | | | Runner-up | | | Other candidate (Note: For purposes of these lists, other candidates are defined as those who were in third place in Arkansas.) | | | EV | Ref. |
| Year | Candidate | Votes | % | Candidate | Votes | % | Candidate | Votes | % | EV | Ref. |
|---|---|---|---|---|---|---|---|---|---|---|---|
| 1868 | Ulysses S. Grant (R)‡ | 22,112 | 53.68% | Horatio Seymour (D) | 19,078 | 46.32% | – | – | – | 5 | |
| 1872 | Ulysses S. Grant (R)‡ | 41,373 | 52.17% | Horace Greeley (LR) (Note: Due to its strong desire to defeat incumbent president Ulysses S. Grant, the 1872 Democratic National Convention also nominated the Liberal Republican Party's Greeley/Brown ticket.) | 37,927 | 47.83% | – | – | – | – (Note: Election was held in Arkansas; however, due to various irregularities including allegations of electoral fraud, all 6 electoral votes from Arkansas were invalidated.) | |
| 1876 | Samuel J. Tilden (D) | 58,086 | 59.92% | Rutherford B. Hayes (R)‡ | 38,649 | 39.87% | Peter Cooper (GB) | 211 | 0.22% | 6 | |
| 1880 | Winfield Scott Hancock (D) | 60,489 | 55.56% | James A. Garfield (R) ‡ | 41,661 | 38.27% | James B. Weaver (GB) | 4,079 | 3.75% | 6 | |
| 1884 | Grover Cleveland (D)‡ | 72,734 | 57.83% | James G. Blaine (R) | 51,198 | 40.7% | Benjamin F. Butler (GB) | 1,847 | 1.47% | 7 | |
| 1888 | Grover Cleveland | 86,062 | 54.8% | Benjamin Harrison (R) ‡ | 59,752 | 38.04% | Alson J. Streeter (L) | 10,630 | 6.77% | 7 | |
| 1892 | Grover Cleveland (D)‡ | 87,834 | 59.3% | Benjamin Harrison (R) | 47,072 | 31.78% | James B. Weaver (PO) | 11,831 | 7.99% | 8 | |
| 1896 | William Jennings Bryan (D) | 110,103 | 73.7% | William McKinley (R) ‡ | 37,512 | 25.11% | Joshua Levering (PRO) | 889 | 0.6% | 8 | |
| 1900 | William Jennings Bryan (D) | 81,242 | 63.49% | William McKinley (R) ‡ | 44,800 | 35.01% | Wharton Barker (PO) | 972 | 0.76% | 8 | |
| 1904 | Alton B. Parker (D) | 64,434 | 55.39% | Theodore Roosevelt (R)‡ | 46,760 | 40.2% | Thomas E. Watson (PO) | 2,318 | 1.99% | 9 | |
| 1908 | William Jennings Bryan (D) | 87,020 | 57.31% | William Howard Taft (R)‡ | 56,684 | 37.33% | Eugene Debs (S) | 5,842 | 3.85% | 9 | |
| 1912 | Woodrow Wilson (D)‡ | 68,814 | 55.01% | William Howard Taft (R) | 25,585 | 20.45% | Theodore Roosevelt (PR-1912) | 21,644 | 17.3% | 9 | |
| 1916 | Woodrow Wilson (D)‡ | 112,211 | 66.65% | Charles Evans Hughes (R) | 48,879 | 29.03% | Allan L. Benson (S) | 6,999 | 4.16% | 9 | |
| 1920 | James M. Cox (D) | 107,409 | 58.49% | Warren G. Harding (R) ‡ | 71,117 | 38.73% | Parley P. Christensen (FL) | 5,111 | 2.78% | 9 | |
| 1924 | John W. Davis (D) | 84,790 | 61.2% | Calvin Coolidge (R) ‡ | 40,583 | 29.29% | Robert M. La Follette (PR-1924) | 13,167 | 9.5% | 9 | |
| 1928 | Al Smith (D) | 119,196 | 60.28% | Herbert Hoover (R)‡ | 77,784 | 39.34% | Norman Thomas (S) | 429 | 0.22% | 9 | |
| 1932 | Franklin D. Roosevelt (D)‡ | 186,829 | 86.27% | Herbert Hoover (R) | 27,466 | 12.68% | Norman Thomas (S) | 1,166 | 0.59% | 9 | |
| 1936 | Franklin D. Roosevelt (D)‡ | 146,765 | 81.79% | Alf Landon (R) | 32,039 | 17.86% | Norman Thomas (S) | 446 | 0.25% | 9 | |
| 1940 | Franklin D. Roosevelt (D)‡ | 157,213 | 78.44% | Wendell Willkie (R) | 42,121 | 21.02% | Roger Babson (PRO) | 793 | 0.4% | 9 | |
| 1944 | Franklin D. Roosevelt (D)‡ | 148,965 | 69.95% | Thomas E. Dewey (R) | 63,551 | 29.84% | Norman Thomas (S) | 438 | 0.21% | 9 | |
| 1948 | Harry S. Truman (D) ‡ | 149,659 | 61.72% | Thomas E. Dewey (R) | 50,959 | 21.02% | Strom Thurmond (DI) | 40,068 | 16.52% | 9 | |
| 1952 | Adlai Stevenson (D) | 226,300 | 55.9% | Dwight D. Eisenhower (R) ‡ | 177,155 | 43.76% | Stuart Hamblen (PRO) | 886 | 0.22% | 8 | |
| 1956 | Adlai Stevenson (D) | 213,277 | 52.46% | Dwight D. Eisenhower (R) ‡ | 186,287 | 45.82% | T. Coleman Andrews (C) | 7,008 | 1.72% | 8 | |
| 1960 | John F. Kennedy (D) ‡ | 215,049 | 50.19% | Richard Nixon (R) | 184,508 | 43.06% | Orval Faubus (NSR) | 28,952 | 6.76% | 8 | |
| 1964 | Lyndon B. Johnson (D) ‡ | 314,197 | 56.06% | Barry Goldwater (R) | 243,264 | 43.41% | John Kasper (NSR) | 2,965 | 0.53% | 6 | |
| 1968 | George Wallace (AI) | 240,982 | 38.87% | Richard Nixon (R) ‡ | 190,759 | 30.77% | Hubert Humphrey (D) | 188,228 | 30.36% | 6 | |
| 1972 | Richard Nixon (R) ‡ | 448,541 | 68.87% | George McGovern (D) | 198,892 | 30.54% | John G. Schmitz (AI) | 2,887 | 0.44% | 6 | |
| 1976 | Jimmy Carter (D) ‡ | 499,614 | 65.09% | Gerald Ford (R) | 268,753 | 35.02% | Eugene McCarthy (I) | 647 | 0.08% | 6 | |
| 1980 | Ronald Reagan (R) ‡ | 403,164 | 48.13% | Jimmy Carter (D) | 398,041 | 47.52% | John B. Anderson (I) | 22,468 | 2.68% | 6 | |
| 1984 | Ronald Reagan (R) ‡ | 534,774 | 60.47% | Walter Mondale (D) | 338,646 | 38.29% | David Bergland (LI) | 2,221 | 0.25% | 6 | |
| 1988 | George H. W. Bush (R) ‡ | 466,578 | 56.37% | Michael Dukakis (D) | 349,237 | 42.19% | David Duke (PO-1984) | 5,146 | 0.62% | 6 | |
| 1992 | Bill Clinton (Note: Arkansas was the home state of Bill Clinton) (D) ‡ | 505,823 | 53.21% | George H. W. Bush (R) | 337,324 | 35.48% | Ross Perot (I) | 99,132 | 10.43% | 6 | |
| 1996 | Bill Clinton (D) ‡ | 475,171 | 53.74% | Bob Dole (R) | 325,416 | 36.8% | Ross Perot (RE) | 69,884 | 7.9% | 6 | |
| 2000 | George W. Bush (R) ‡ | 472,940 | 51.31% | Al Gore (D) | 422,768 | 45.86% | Ralph Nader (G) | 13,421 | 1.46% | 6 | |
| 2004 | George W. Bush (R)‡ | 572,898 | 54.31% | John Kerry (D) | 469,953 | 44.55% | Ralph Nader (I) | 6,171 | 0.58% | 6 | |
| 2008 | John McCain (R) | 638,017 | 58.72% | Barack Obama (D)‡ | 422,310 | 38.86% | Ralph Nader (I) | 12,882 | 1.19% | 6 | |
| 2012 | Mitt Romney (R) | 647,744 | 60.57% | Barack Obama (D)‡ | 394,409 | 36.88% | Gary Johnson (LI) | 16,276 | 1.52% | 6 | |
| 2016 | Donald Trump (R)‡ | 684,872 | 60.57% | Hillary Clinton (D) | 380,494 | 33.65% | Gary Johnson (LI) | 29,829 | 2.64% | 6 | |
| 2020 | Donald Trump (R) | 760,647 | 62.4% | Joe Biden (D)‡ | 423,932 | 34.78% | Jo Jorgensen (LI) | 13,133 | 1.08% | 6 | |
| 2024 | Donald Trump (R)‡ | 759,241 | 64.2% | Kamala Harris (D) | 396,905 | 33.56% | Robert F. Kennedy Jr. (I) | 13,255 | 1.12% | 6 | |

==== Graph ====
View source data.

== See also ==
- Elections in Arkansas
- List of United States presidential election results by state

== Works cited ==
- Guide to U.S. Elections. SAGE Publications. 2010. ISBN 978-1-60426-536-1.
- Burnham, Walter Dean (1955). Presidential ballots, 1836–1892. Johns Hopkins University Press. LCCN 55008428. OL 6176796M.
- Presidential elections, 1789–1996. Congressional Quarterly. 1997. ISBN 978-1-56802-065-5. LCCN 97019084. OL 673017M.
