= 1868 United States presidential election in Arkansas =

- November 3, 1868
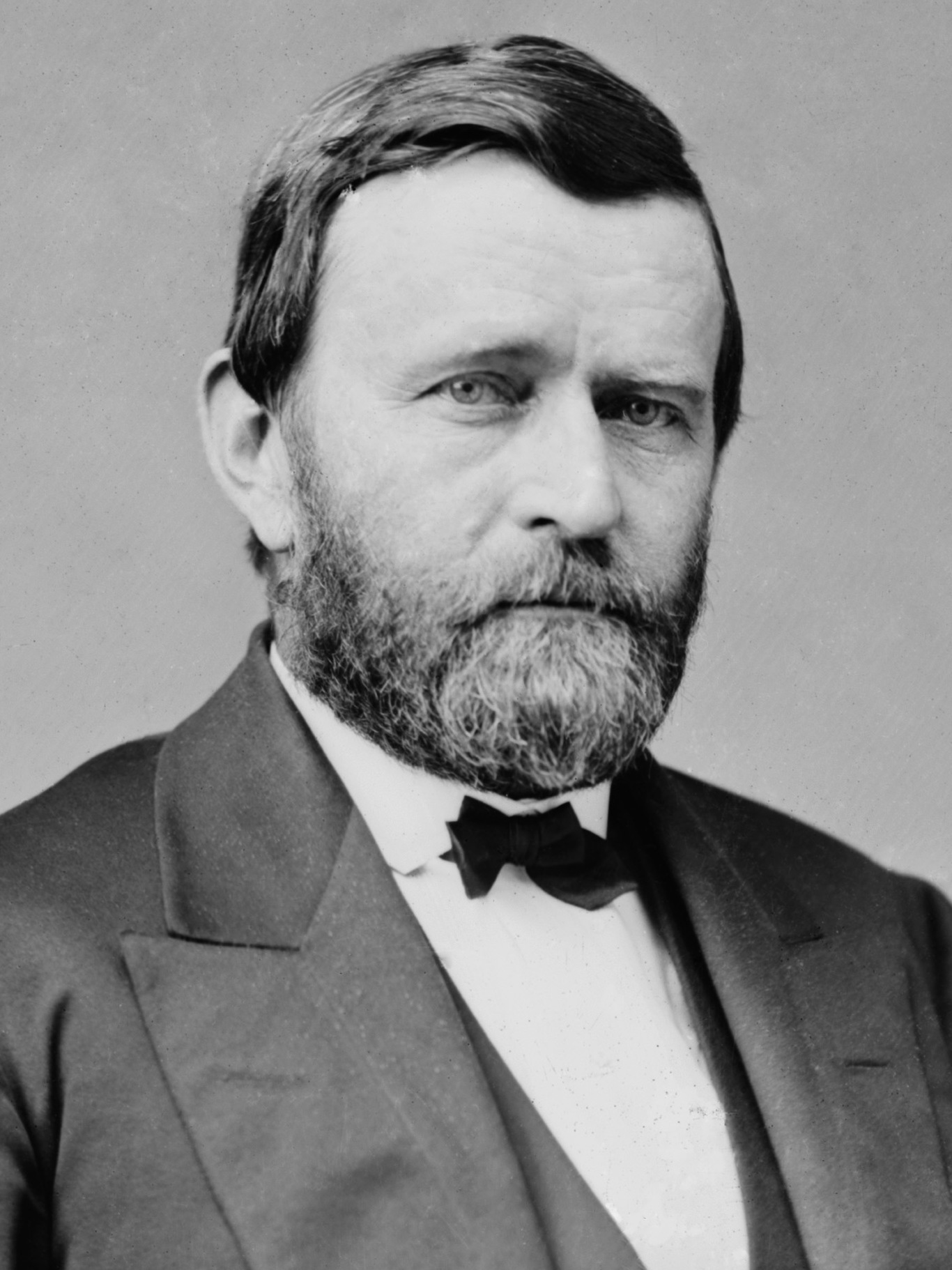

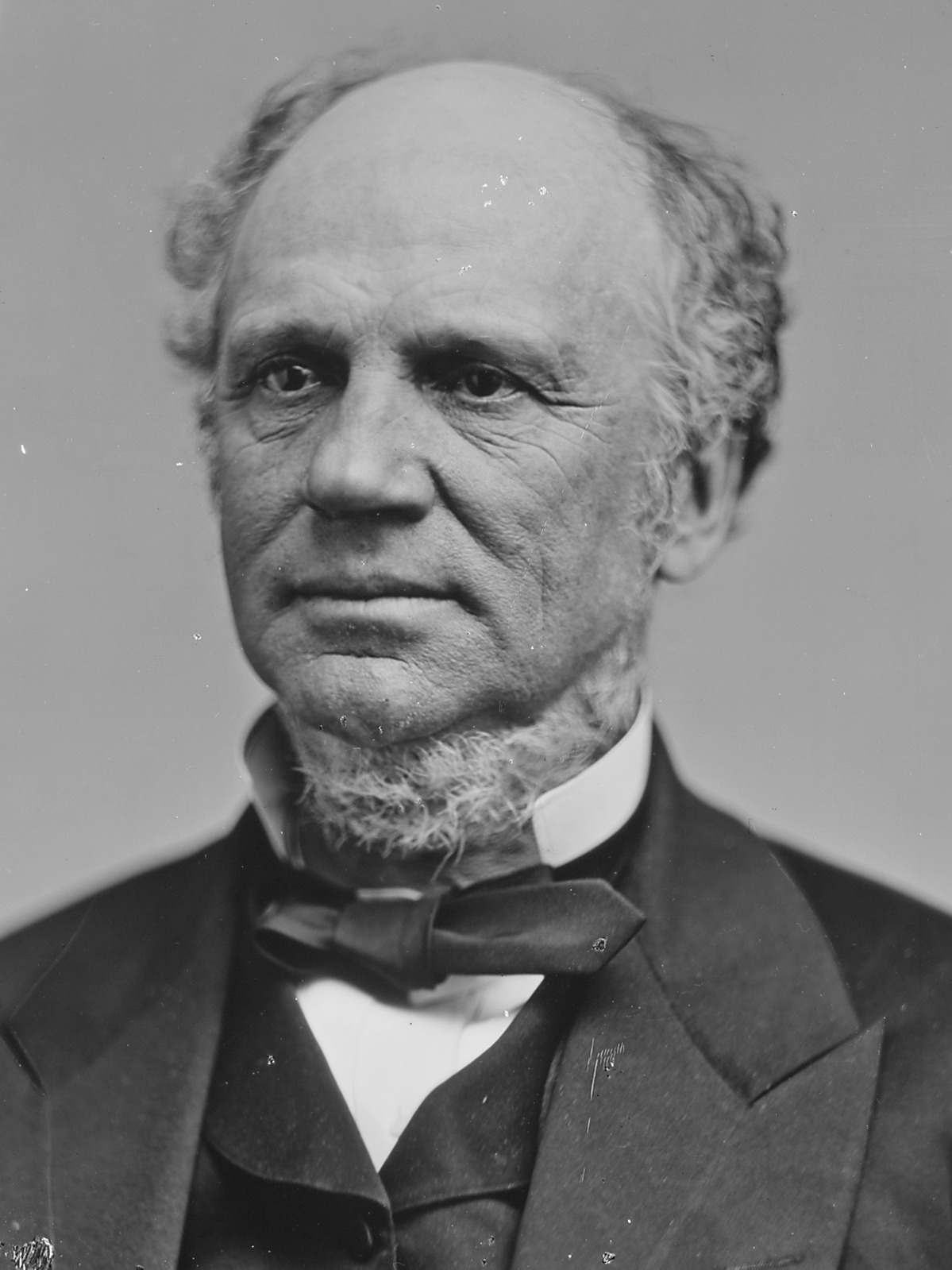
Nominee	Ulysses S. Grant	Horatio Seymour
Party	Republican	Democratic
Home state	Illinois	New York
Running mate	Schuyler Colfax	Francis Preston Blair Jr.
Electoral vote	5	0
Popular vote	22,112	19,078
Percentage	53.68%	46.32%
County results
Grant
50–60%
60–70%
70–80%
80–90%
Seymour
50–60%
60–70%
70–80%
80–90%
90–100%
Unknown/No vote
President before election
Andrew Johnson
Democratic
Elected President
Ulysses S. Grant
Republican

The 1868 United States presidential election in Arkansas took place on November 3, 1868, as part of the 1868 United States presidential election. Voters chose five representatives, or electors to the Electoral College, who voted for president and vice president.

Republican Ulysses S. Grant became the first of his party to ever carry Arkansas, taking 53.68% of the state's vote to Democrat Horatio Seymour's 46.32%.

This was the first time since 1860 that a presidential election was held in the state due to its secession, the American Civil War, and Reconstruction. This was one of only two times in the 19th century that Arkansas backed a Republican candidate; the party would carry it once more in the next election, before waiting 100 years, until 1972, to win it again. This was also the last time until 1980 that the state backed a non-incumbent Republican.

Fourteen counties either did not vote or had their votes thrown out, because, according to Governor Powell Clayton, violence from Confederate militias made voter registration impossible. These counties are: Ashley, Bradley, Columbia, Craighead, Greene, Lafayette, Little River, Mississippi, Sevier, Woodruff, Conway, Crittenden, Drew, and Fulton.

== Results ==
1868 United States presidential election in Arkansas
Party	Candidate	Running mate	Popular vote		Electoral vote	
Party	Candidate	Running mate	Count	%	Count	%
Republican	Ulysses S. Grant of Illinois	Schuyler Colfax of Indiana	22,112	53.68%	5	100.00%
Democratic	Horatio Seymour of New York	Francis Preston Blair Jr. of Missouri	19,078	46.32%	0	0.00%
Total			41,190	100.00%	5	100.00%

== See also ==
- United States presidential elections in Arkansas
