= 1884 United States presidential election in Arkansas =

- November 4, 1884

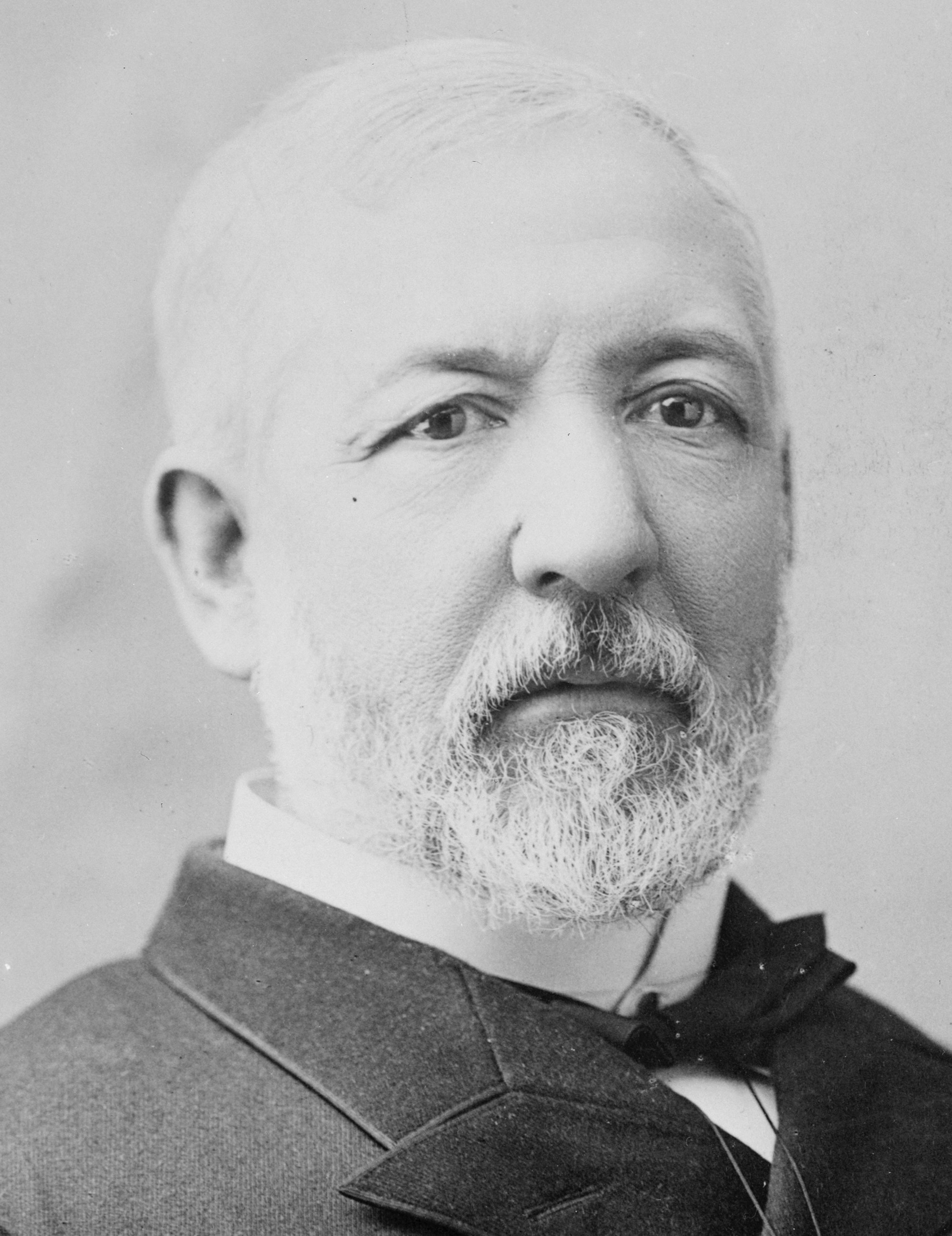
Nominee	Grover Cleveland	James G. Blaine
Party	Democratic	Republican
Home state	New York	Maine
Running mate	Thomas A. Hendricks	John A. Logan
Electoral vote	7	0
Popular vote	72,734	51,198
Percentage	57.83%	40.70%
County results
Cleveland
40–50%
50–60%
60–70%
70–80%
80–90%
90–100%
Blaine
50–60%
60–70%
70–80%
80–90%
90–100%
President before election
Chester A. Arthur
Republican
Elected President
Grover Cleveland
Democratic

The 1884 United States presidential election in Arkansas took place on November 4, 1884. All contemporary 38 states were part of the 1884 United States presidential election. Arkansas voters chose seven electors to the Electoral College, which selected the president and vice president.

Arkansas voted for the Democratic nominee, Grover Cleveland, over the Republican nominee, James G. Blaine by a margin of 17.12%.

== Results ==
1884 United States presidential election in Arkansas
Party	Candidate	Running mate	Popular vote		Electoral vote	
Party	Candidate	Running mate	Count	%	Count	%
Democratic	Grover Cleveland of New York	Thomas Andrews Hendricks of Indiana	72,734	57.83%	7	100.00%
Republican	James Gillespie Blaine of Maine	John Alexander Logan of Illinois	51,198	40.70%	0	0.00%
Greenback	Benjamin Franklin Butler of Massachusetts	Absolom Madden West of Mississippi	1,847	1.47%	0	0.00%
Total			125,779	100.00%	7	100.00%

== See also ==
- United States presidential elections in Arkansas
