= 1844 United States presidential election in Arkansas =

- November 4, 1844
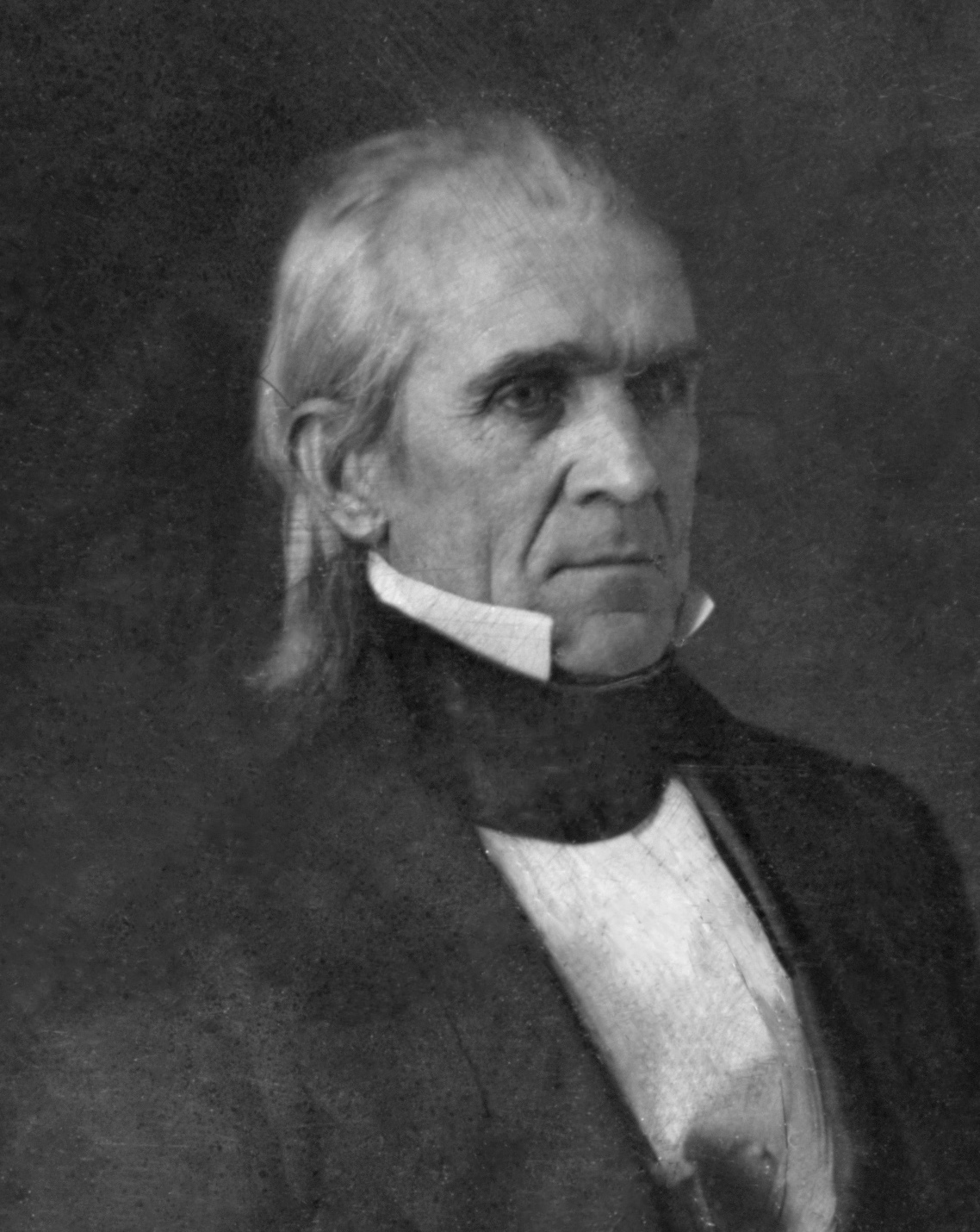

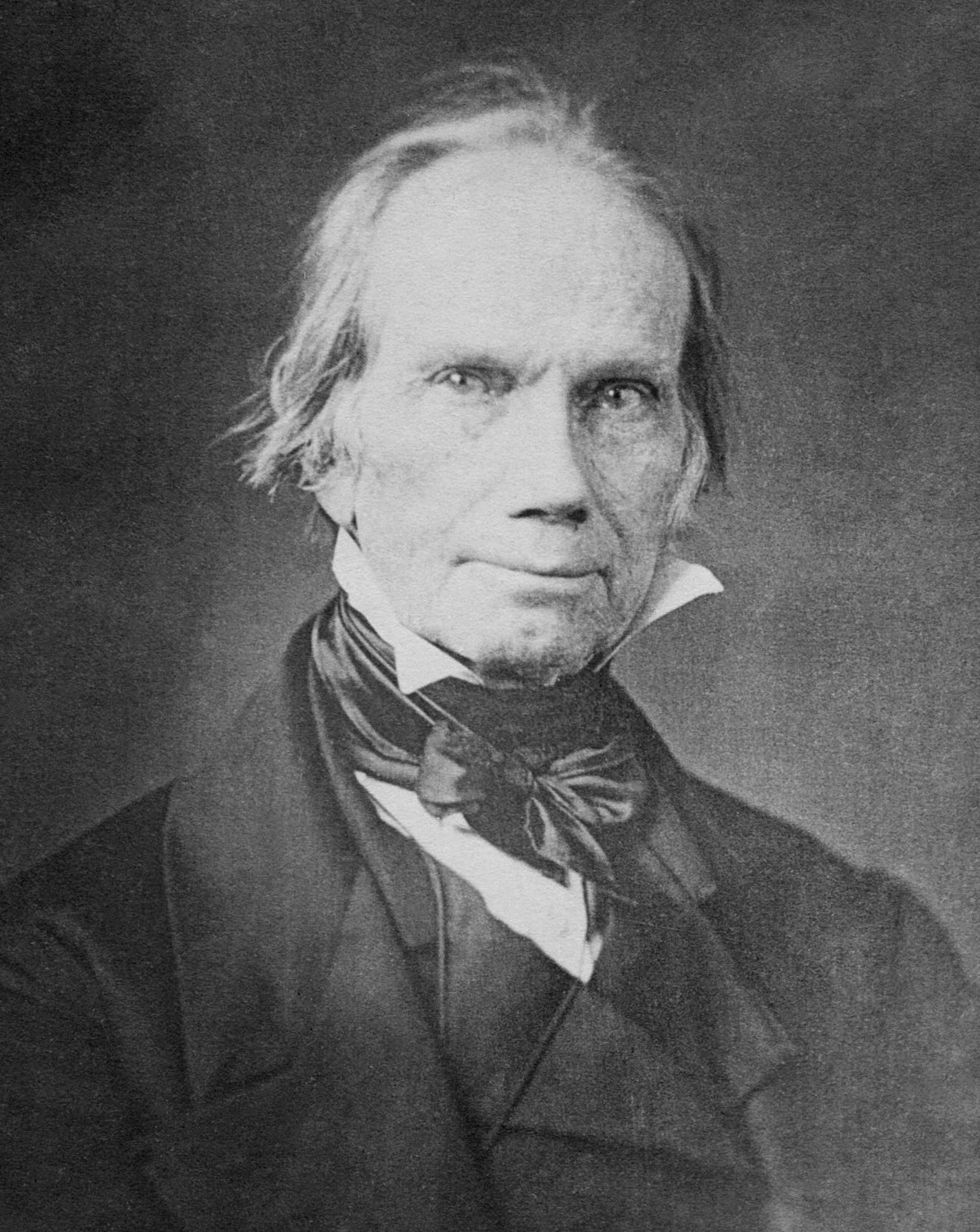
| Nominee | James K. Polk | Henry Clay |
| Party | Democratic | Whig |
| Home state | Tennessee | Kentucky |
| Running mate | George M. Dallas | Theodore Frelinghuysen |
| Electoral vote | 3 | 0 |
| Popular vote | 9,546 | 5,604 |
| Percentage | 63.01% | 36.99% |
County results
Polks
50–60%
60–70%
70–80%
80–90%
Clay
50–60%
60–70%
No Vote:
President before election
John Tyler
Independent
Elected President
James K. Polk
Democratic

A presidential election was held in Arkansas on November 4, 1844 as part of the 1844 United States presidential election. Voters chose three representatives, or electors to the Electoral College, who voted for President and Vice President.

Arkansas voted for the Democratic candidate, James K. Polk, over Whig candidate Henry Clay. Polk won Arkansas by a margin of 26.02%.

== Results ==
1844 United States presidential election in Arkansas
| Party | Candidate | Running mate | Popular vote | | Electoral vote | |
| Party | Candidate | Running mate | Count | % | Count | % |
|---|---|---|---|---|---|---|
| Democratic | James K. Polk of Tennessee | George M. Dallas of Pennsylvania | 9,546 | 63.01% | 3 | 100.00% |
| Whig | Henry Clay of Kentucky | Theodore Frelinghuysen of New York | 5,604 | 36.99% | 0 | 0.00% |
| Total | | | 15,150 | 100.00% | 3 | 100.00% |

== See also ==
- United States presidential elections in Arkansas
