= 1944 United States presidential election in Arkansas =

- November 7, 1944

All 9 Arkansas votes to the Electoral College

| Nominee | Franklin D. Roosevelt | Thomas E. Dewey |
| Party | Democratic | Republican |
| Home state | New York | New York |
| Running mate | Harry S. Truman | John W. Bricker |
| Electoral vote | 9 | 0 |
| Popular vote | 148,965 | 63,551 |
| Percentage | 69.95% | 29.84% |
County results
Roosevelt
40–50%
50–60%
60–70%
70–80%
80–90%
90–100%
Dewey
50–60%
60–70%
President before election
Franklin D. Roosevelt
Democratic
Elected President
Franklin D. Roosevelt
Democratic

The 1944 United States presidential election in Arkansas took place on November 7, 1944, as part of the 1944 United States presidential election. State voters chose nine representatives, or electors, to the Electoral College, who voted for president and vice president.

Arkansas was won by incumbent President Franklin D. Roosevelt (D–New York), running with Senator Harry S. Truman, with 69.95 percent of the popular vote, against Governor Thomas E. Dewey (R–New York), running with Governor John W. Bricker, with 29.84 percent of the popular vote.

== Results ==
1944 United States presidential election in Arkansas
| Party | Candidate | Votes | % |
|---|---|---|---|
| Democratic | Franklin D. Roosevelt (inc.) | 148,965 | 69.95% |
| Republican | Thomas E. Dewey | 63,551 | 29.84% |
| Socialist | Norman Thomas | 438 | 0.21% |
| Total votes | | 212,954 | 100.00% |

=== Results by county ===
1944 United States presidential election in Arkansas by county
| County | Franklin Delano Roosevelt Democratic | | Thomas Edmund Dewey Republican | | Norman Mattoon Thomas Socialist | | Margin | | Total votes cast |
| County | # | % | # | % | # | % | # | % | Total votes cast |
|---|---|---|---|---|---|---|---|---|---|
| Arkansas | 1,711 | 62.20% | 1,031 | 37.48% | 9 | 0.33% | 680 | 24.72% | 2,751 |
| Ashley | 2,169 | 88.17% | 285 | 11.59% | 6 | 0.24% | 1,884 | 76.59% | 2,460 |
| Baxter | 796 | 58.02% | 572 | 41.69% | 4 | 0.29% | 224 | 16.33% | 1,372 |
| Benton | 2,861 | 46.33% | 3,305 | 53.52% | 9 | 0.15% | -444 | -7.19% | 6,175 |
| Boone | 2,132 | 61.25% | 1,349 | 38.75% | 0 | 0.00% | 783 | 22.49% | 3,481 |
| Bradley | 1,710 | 91.10% | 162 | 8.63% | 5 | 0.27% | 1,548 | 82.47% | 1,877 |
| Calhoun | 906 | 88.13% | 122 | 11.87% | 0 | 0.00% | 784 | 76.26% | 1,028 |
| Carroll | 1,464 | 55.45% | 1,176 | 44.55% | 0 | 0.00% | 288 | 10.91% | 2,640 |
| Chicot | 1,552 | 84.99% | 270 | 14.79% | 4 | 0.22% | 1,282 | 70.21% | 1,826 |
| Clark | 1,981 | 75.58% | 637 | 24.30% | 3 | 0.11% | 1,344 | 51.28% | 2,621 |
| Clay | 1,934 | 57.54% | 1,422 | 42.31% | 5 | 0.15% | 512 | 15.23% | 3,361 |
| Cleburne | 839 | 58.39% | 582 | 40.50% | 16 | 1.11% | 257 | 17.88% | 1,437 |
| Cleveland | 960 | 86.49% | 150 | 13.51% | 0 | 0.00% | 810 | 72.97% | 1,110 |
| Columbia | 2,145 | 84.35% | 394 | 15.49% | 4 | 0.16% | 1,751 | 68.86% | 2,543 |
| Conway | 1,579 | 71.09% | 639 | 28.77% | 3 | 0.14% | 940 | 42.32% | 2,221 |
| Craighead | 3,582 | 70.60% | 1,474 | 29.05% | 18 | 0.35% | 2,108 | 41.55% | 5,074 |
| Crawford | 1,702 | 59.47% | 1,141 | 39.87% | 19 | 0.66% | 561 | 19.60% | 2,862 |
| Crittenden | 1,548 | 80.63% | 372 | 19.38% | 0 | 0.00% | 1,176 | 61.25% | 1,920 |
| Cross | 1,724 | 79.01% | 452 | 20.71% | 6 | 0.27% | 1,272 | 58.30% | 2,182 |
| Dallas | 1,238 | 82.15% | 266 | 17.65% | 3 | 0.20% | 972 | 64.50% | 1,507 |
| Desha | 1,175 | 86.27% | 186 | 13.66% | 1 | 0.07% | 989 | 72.61% | 1,362 |
| Drew | 1,370 | 81.02% | 320 | 18.92% | 1 | 0.06% | 1,050 | 62.09% | 1,691 |
| Faulkner | 2,332 | 72.00% | 897 | 27.69% | 10 | 0.31% | 1,435 | 44.30% | 3,239 |
| Franklin | 1,188 | 72.13% | 457 | 27.75% | 2 | 0.12% | 731 | 44.38% | 1,647 |
| Fulton | 660 | 55.60% | 525 | 44.23% | 2 | 0.17% | 135 | 11.37% | 1,187 |
| Garland | 3,596 | 63.43% | 2,069 | 36.50% | 4 | 0.07% | 1,527 | 26.94% | 5,669 |
| Grant | 1,088 | 76.51% | 334 | 23.49% | 0 | 0.00% | 754 | 53.02% | 1,422 |
| Greene | 2,565 | 73.26% | 928 | 26.51% | 8 | 0.23% | 1,637 | 46.76% | 3,501 |
| Hempstead | 2,157 | 77.34% | 624 | 22.37% | 8 | 0.29% | 1,533 | 54.97% | 2,789 |
| Hot Spring | 1,646 | 65.58% | 853 | 33.98% | 11 | 0.44% | 793 | 31.59% | 2,510 |
| Howard | 1,538 | 72.62% | 576 | 27.20% | 4 | 0.19% | 962 | 45.42% | 2,118 |
| Independence | 1,779 | 59.70% | 1,192 | 40.00% | 9 | 0.30% | 587 | 19.70% | 2,980 |
| Izard | 853 | 67.75% | 402 | 31.93% | 4 | 0.32% | 451 | 35.82% | 1,259 |
| Jackson | 2,318 | 84.85% | 414 | 15.15% | 0 | 0.00% | 1,904 | 69.69% | 2,732 |
| Jefferson | 4,095 | 72.15% | 1,578 | 27.80% | 3 | 0.05% | 2,517 | 44.34% | 5,676 |
| Johnson | 1,311 | 68.60% | 593 | 31.03% | 7 | 0.37% | 718 | 37.57% | 1,911 |
| Lafayette | 1,150 | 86.66% | 177 | 13.34% | 0 | 0.00% | 973 | 73.32% | 1,327 |
| Lawrence | 1,810 | 66.06% | 927 | 33.83% | 3 | 0.11% | 883 | 32.23% | 2,740 |
| Lee | 1,118 | 80.09% | 275 | 19.70% | 3 | 0.21% | 843 | 60.39% | 1,396 |
| Lincoln | 1,034 | 88.00% | 141 | 12.00% | 0 | 0.00% | 893 | 76.00% | 1,175 |
| Little River | 961 | 74.55% | 326 | 25.29% | 2 | 0.16% | 635 | 49.26% | 1,289 |
| Logan | 2,269 | 63.83% | 1,279 | 35.98% | 7 | 0.20% | 990 | 27.85% | 3,555 |
| Lonoke | 2,064 | 74.70% | 697 | 25.23% | 2 | 0.07% | 1,367 | 49.48% | 2,763 |
| Madison | 1,788 | 45.75% | 2,120 | 54.25% | 0 | 0.00% | -332 | -8.50% | 3,908 |
| Marion | 842 | 66.40% | 414 | 32.65% | 12 | 0.95% | 428 | 33.75% | 1,268 |
| Miller | 2,873 | 74.60% | 972 | 25.24% | 6 | 0.16% | 1,901 | 49.36% | 3,851 |
| Mississippi | 3,938 | 75.22% | 1,292 | 24.68% | 5 | 0.10% | 2,646 | 50.54% | 5,235 |
| Monroe | 1,311 | 81.63% | 291 | 18.12% | 4 | 0.25% | 1,020 | 63.51% | 1,606 |
| Montgomery | 573 | 62.01% | 349 | 37.77% | 2 | 0.22% | 224 | 24.24% | 924 |
| Nevada | 1,353 | 76.40% | 415 | 23.43% | 3 | 0.17% | 938 | 52.96% | 1,771 |
| Newton | 710 | 43.03% | 934 | 56.61% | 6 | 0.36% | -224 | -13.58% | 1,650 |
| Ouachita | 3,154 | 86.93% | 473 | 13.04% | 1 | 0.03% | 2,681 | 73.90% | 3,628 |
| Perry | 710 | 71.36% | 285 | 28.64% | 0 | 0.00% | 425 | 42.71% | 995 |
| Phillips | 2,046 | 80.30% | 501 | 19.66% | 1 | 0.04% | 1,545 | 60.64% | 2,548 |
| Pike | 877 | 67.88% | 405 | 31.35% | 10 | 0.77% | 472 | 36.53% | 1,292 |
| Poinsett | 2,506 | 88.93% | 311 | 11.04% | 1 | 0.04% | 2,195 | 77.89% | 2,818 |
| Polk | 999 | 56.35% | 764 | 43.09% | 10 | 0.56% | 235 | 13.25% | 1,773 |
| Pope | 2,048 | 71.58% | 805 | 28.14% | 8 | 0.28% | 1,243 | 43.45% | 2,861 |
| Prairie | 1,117 | 70.47% | 465 | 29.34% | 3 | 0.19% | 652 | 41.14% | 1,585 |
| Pulaski | 16,470 | 72.91% | 6,069 | 26.87% | 50 | 0.22% | 10,401 | 46.04% | 22,589 |
| Randolph | 1,514 | 73.89% | 529 | 25.82% | 6 | 0.29% | 985 | 48.07% | 2,049 |
| St. Francis | 1,654 | 78.46% | 446 | 21.16% | 8 | 0.38% | 1,208 | 57.31% | 2,108 |
| Saline | 2,556 | 79.45% | 643 | 19.99% | 18 | 0.56% | 1,913 | 59.47% | 3,217 |
| Scott | 898 | 72.07% | 348 | 27.93% | 0 | 0.00% | 550 | 44.14% | 1,246 |
| Searcy | 891 | 38.62% | 1,409 | 61.07% | 7 | 0.30% | -518 | -22.45% | 2,307 |
| Sebastian | 6,008 | 63.46% | 3,452 | 36.46% | 7 | 0.07% | 2,556 | 27.00% | 9,467 |
| Sevier | 1,356 | 77.66% | 389 | 22.28% | 1 | 0.06% | 967 | 55.38% | 1,746 |
| Sharp | 1,217 | 64.29% | 664 | 35.08% | 12 | 0.63% | 553 | 29.21% | 1,893 |
| Stone | 592 | 51.30% | 549 | 47.57% | 13 | 1.13% | 43 | 3.73% | 1,154 |
| Union | 4,624 | 84.70% | 833 | 15.26% | 2 | 0.04% | 3,791 | 69.44% | 5,459 |
| Van Buren | 1,090 | 62.39% | 655 | 37.49% | 2 | 0.11% | 435 | 24.90% | 1,747 |
| Washington | 3,089 | 49.81% | 3,084 | 49.73% | 28 | 0.45% | 5 | 0.08% | 6,201 |
| White | 2,532 | 65.29% | 1,346 | 34.71% | 0 | 0.00% | 1,186 | 30.58% | 3,878 |
| Woodruff | 1,377 | 82.85% | 279 | 16.79% | 6 | 0.36% | 1,098 | 66.06% | 1,662 |
| Yell | 1,642 | 77.02% | 489 | 22.94% | 1 | 0.05% | 1,153 | 54.08% | 2,132 |
| Totals | 148,965 | 69.95% | 63,551 | 29.84% | 438 | 0.21% | 85,414 | 40.11% | 212,954 |

==== Counties that flipped from Democratic to Republican ====
- Benton
- Madison

== See also ==
- United States presidential elections in Arkansas
