= 1888 United States presidential election in Arkansas =

- November 6, 1888
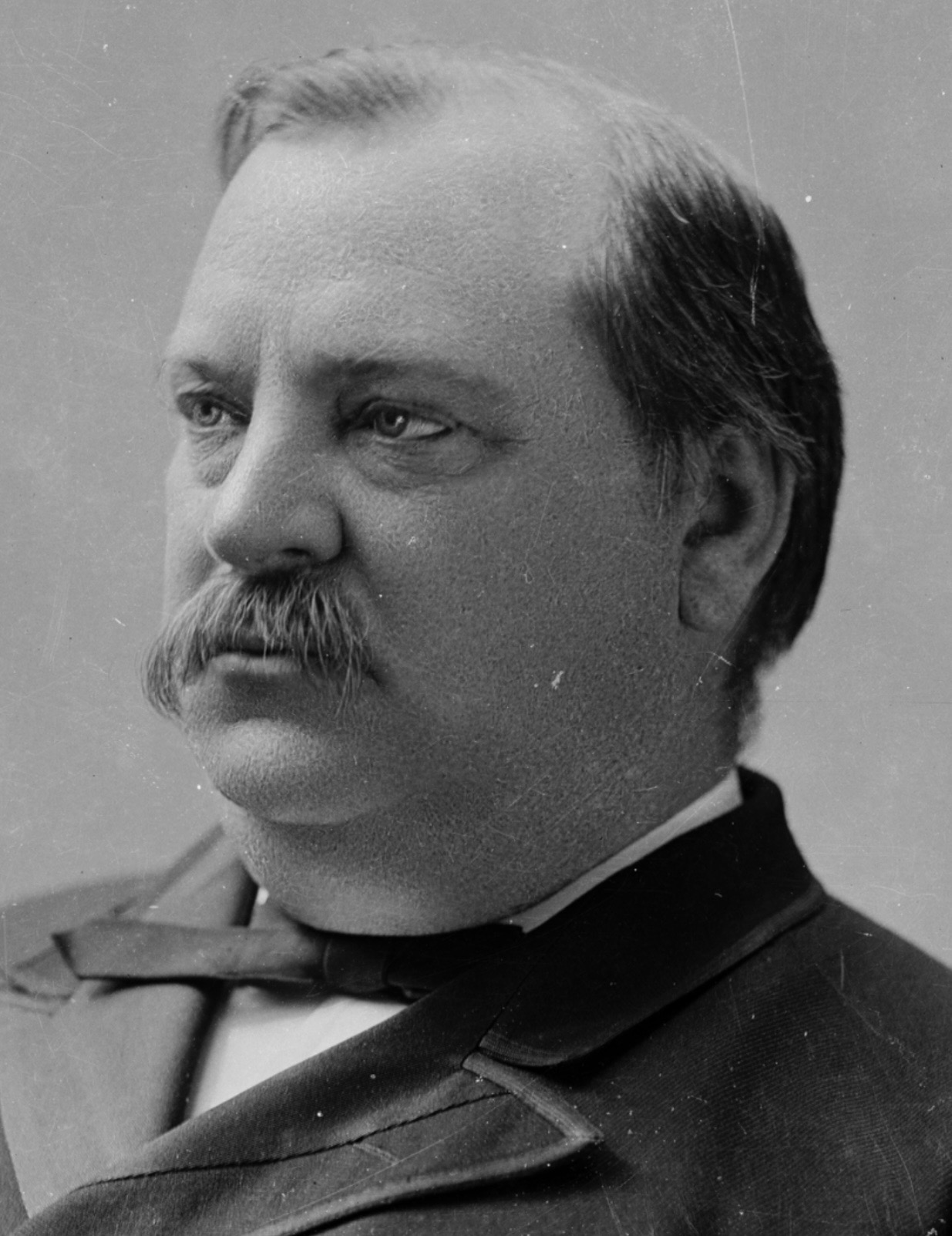

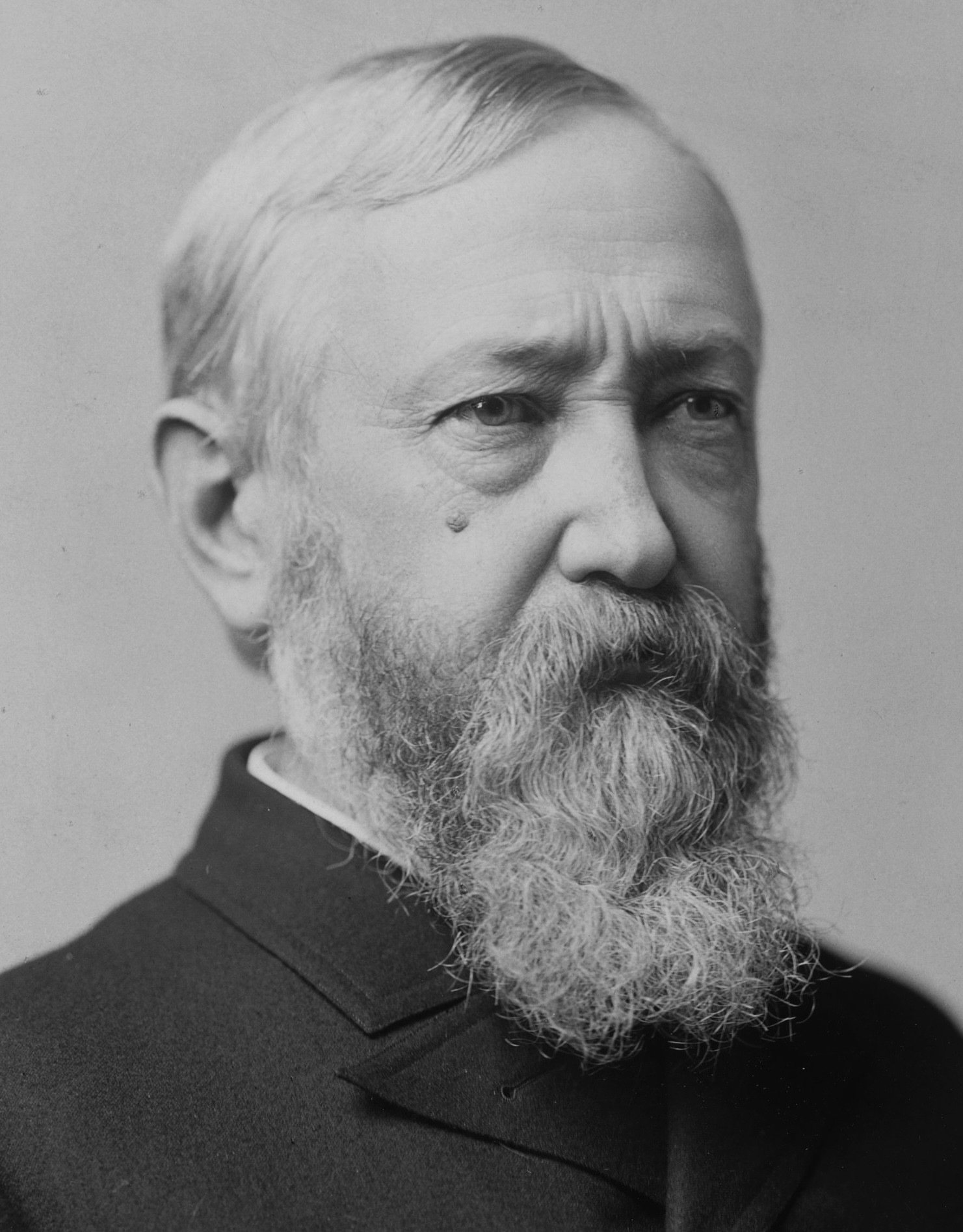

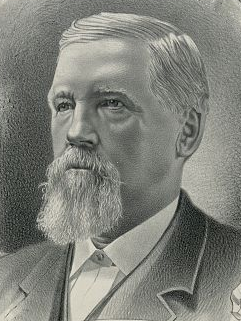
Nominee	Grover Cleveland	Benjamin Harrison	Alson Streeter
Party	Democratic	Republican	Union Labor
Home state	New York	Indiana	Illinois
Running mate	Allen G. Thurman	Levi P. Morton	Charles E. Cunningham
Electoral vote	7	0	0
Popular vote	86,062	59,752	10,630
Percentage	54.80%	38.04%	6.77%
County results
Cleveland
40–50%
50–60%
60–70%
70–80%
80–90%
Harrison
40–50%
50–60%
60–70%
70–80%
80–90%
President before election
Grover Cleveland
Democratic
Elected President
Benjamin Harrison
Republican

The 1888 United States presidential election in Arkansas took place on November 6, 1888, as part of the 1888 United States presidential election. Voters chose seven representatives, or electors, to the Electoral College, who voted for president and vice president.

Arkansas voted for the Democratic nominee, incumbent President Grover Cleveland, over the Republican nominee, Benjamin Harrison. Cleveland won the state by a margin of 16.76%.

== Campaign ==
The Union Labor Party held its convention in Little Rock, on April 30, 1888.

Arkansas had the third-highest percentage for Streeter. Charles Norwood, the Union Labor gubernatorial candidate, narrowly lost in the concurrent election, while Lewis P. Featherstone was elected to the United States House of Representatives.

== Results ==
1888 United States presidential election in Arkansas
Party	Candidate	Running mate	Popular vote		Electoral vote	
Party	Candidate	Running mate	Count	%	Count	%
Democratic	Grover Cleveland of New York (inc.)	Allen Granberry Thurman of Ohio	86,062	54.80%	7	100.00%
Republican	Benjamin Harrison of Indiana	Levi Parsons Morton of New York	59,752	38.04%	0	0.00%
Union Labor	Alson Jenness Streeter of Illinois	Charles E. Cunningham of Arkansas	10,630	6.77%	0	0.00%
Prohibition	Clinton Bowen Fisk of New Jersey	John Anderson Brooks of Missouri	614	0.39%	0	0.00%
Total			157,058	100.00%	7	100.00%

== See also ==
- United States presidential elections in Arkansas

== Works cited ==
- Hild, Matthew (2020). "The Knights of Labor in Arkansas: A Research Note". The Arkansas Historical Quarterly. 79 (1). Arkansas Historical Association: 59–63. JSTOR 26924945.
- Hild, Matthew (2004). "Labor, Third-Party Politics, and New South Democracy in Arkansas, 1884-1896". The Arkansas Historical Quarterly. 63 (1). Arkansas Historical Association: 24–43. JSTOR 40019008.
