= 1848 United States presidential election in Arkansas =

- November 7, 1848
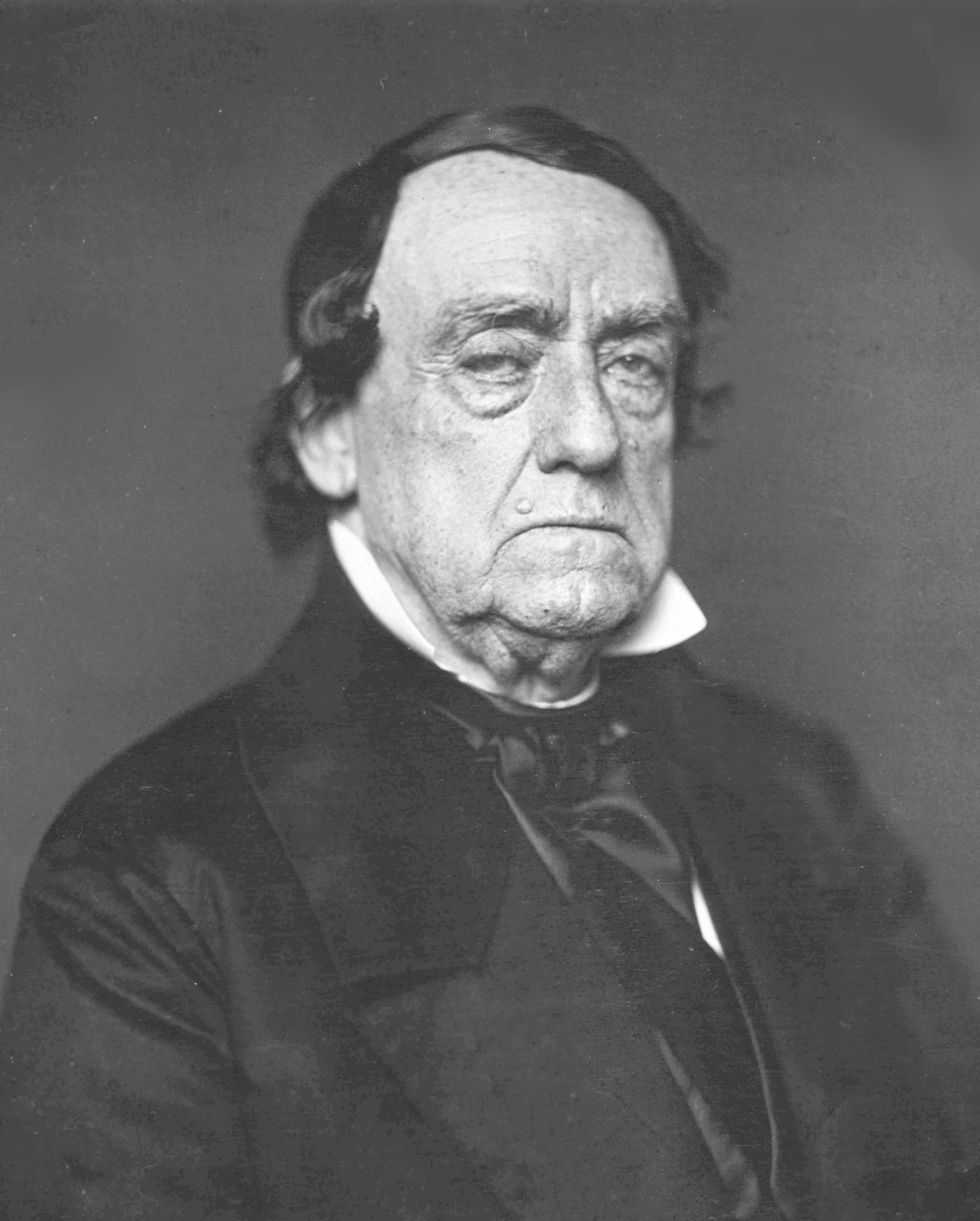

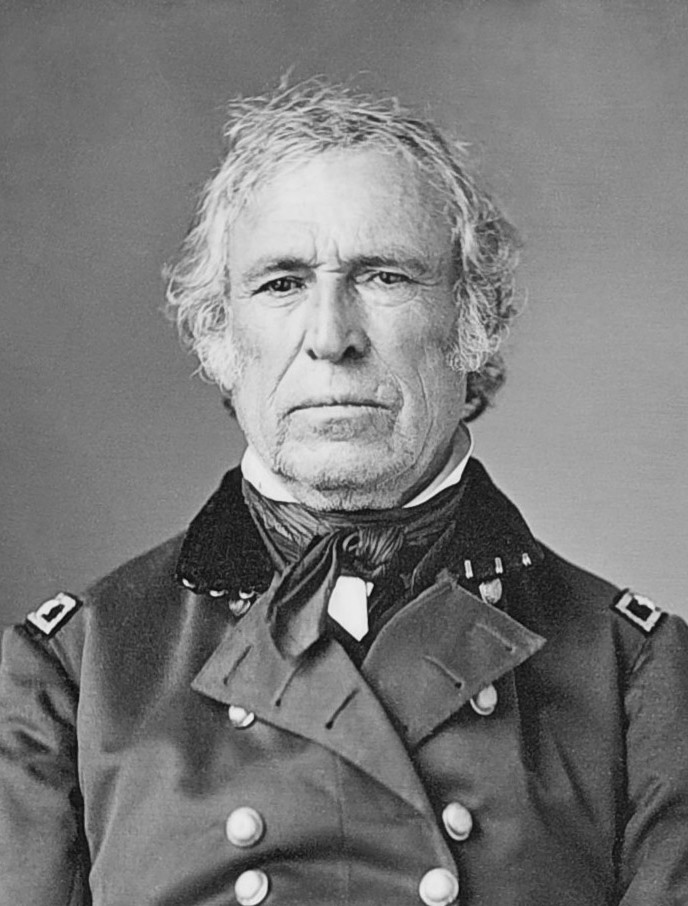
Nominee	Lewis Cass	Zachary Taylor
Party	Democratic	Whig
Home state	Michigan	Louisiana
Running mate	William O. Butler	Millard Fillmore
Electoral vote	3	0
Popular vote	9,301	7,587
Percentage	55.07%	44.93%
County results
Cass
50–60%
60–70%
70–80%
90–100%
Taylor
50–60%
60–70%
No Vote:
Rejected:
President before election
James K. Polk
Democratic
Elected President
Zachary Taylor
Whig

The 1848 United States presidential election in Arkansas took place on November 7, 1848, as part of the 1848 United States presidential election. Voters chose three representatives, or electors to the Electoral College, who voted for President and Vice President.

Arkansas voted for the Democratic candidate, Lewis Cass, over Whig candidate Zachary Taylor. Cass won Arkansas by a margin of 10.14%.

== Results ==
1848 United States presidential election in Arkansas
Party	Candidate	Running mate	Popular vote		Electoral vote	
Party	Candidate	Running mate	Count	%	Count	%
Democratic	Lewis Cass of Michigan	William O. Butler of Kentucky	9,301	55.07%	3	100.00%
Whig	Zachary Taylor of Louisiana	Millard Fillmore of New York	7,587	44.93%	0	0.00%
Total			16,888	100.00%	3	100.00%

== See also ==
- United States presidential elections in Arkansas
