= 1956 United States presidential election in Arkansas =

- November 6, 1956

All 8 Arkansas votes to the Electoral College

Nominee	Adlai Stevenson	Dwight D. Eisenhower
Party	Democratic	Republican
Home state	Illinois	Pennsylvania (Note: Although he was born in Texas and grew up in Kansas before his military career, at the time of the 1952 election Eisenhower was president of Columbia University and was, officially, a resident of New York. During his first term as president, he moved his private residence to Gettysburg, Pennsylvania, and officially changed his residency to Pennsylvania.)
Running mate	Estes Kefauver	Richard Nixon
Electoral vote	8	0
Popular vote	213,777	186,287
Percentage	52.46%	45.82%

Stevenson
50–60%
60–70%
70–80%
Eisenhower
40–50%
50–60%
60–70%
70–80%
President before election
Dwight D. Eisenhower
Republican
Elected President
Dwight D. Eisenhower
Republican

The 1956 United States presidential election in Arkansas took place on November 6, 1956, as part of the 1956 United States presidential election. State voters chose eight representatives, or electors, to the Electoral College, who voted for president and vice president.

Arkansas was won by Adlai Stevenson (D–Illinois), running with Senator Estes Kefauver, with 52.46% of the popular vote against incumbent President Dwight D. Eisenhower (R–Pennsylvania), running with Vice President Richard Nixon, with 45.82% of the popular vote. This is currently the last election to date in which the Democratic candidate won Arkansas without winning the presidency.

== Polls ==
Source	Rating	As of
Fort Worth Star-Telegram	Safe D	November 2, 1956
The Philadelphia Inquirer	Likely D	November 4, 1956
The Salt Lake Tribune	Likely D	November 4, 1956

== Results ==
1956 United States presidential election in Arkansas
Party	Candidate	Votes	%
Democratic	Adlai Stevenson	213,277	52.46%
Republican	Dwight D. Eisenhower (inc.)	186,287	45.82%
Constitution	T. Coleman Andrews	7,008	1.72%
Total votes		406,572	100%

=== Results by county ===
County	Adlai Stevenson Democratic		Dwight D. Eisenhower Republican		T. Coleman Andrews Constitution		Margin		Total votes cast
County	#	%	#	%	#	%	#	%	Total votes cast
Arkansas	2,736	48.55%	2,826	50.15%	73	1.30%	-90	-1.60%	5,635
Ashley	2,820	66.04%	1,183	27.70%	267	6.25%	1,637	38.34%	4,270
Baxter	1,451	45.46%	1,721	53.92%	20	0.63%	-270	-8.46%	3,192
Benton	3,744	36.33%	6,500	63.08%	61	0.59%	-2,756	-26.75%	10,305
Boone	2,829	47.10%	3,153	52.50%	24	0.40%	-324	-5.40%	6,006
Bradley	3,010	68.01%	1,361	30.75%	55	1.24%	1,649	37.26%	4,426
Calhoun	1,303	73.95%	445	25.26%	14	0.79%	858	48.69%	1,762
Carroll	1,651	41.48%	2,310	58.04%	19	0.48%	-659	-16.56%	3,980
Chicot	2,273	65.79%	1,043	30.19%	139	4.02%	1,230	35.60%	3,455
Clark	2,809	58.04%	1,973	40.76%	58	1.20%	836	17.28%	4,840
Clay	2,368	57.57%	1,711	41.60%	34	0.83%	657	15.97%	4,113
Cleburne	1,094	53.42%	947	46.24%	7	0.34%	147	7.18%	2,048
Cleveland	1,149	72.17%	423	26.57%	20	1.26%	726	45.60%	1,592
Columbia	2,845	52.74%	2,342	43.42%	207	3.84%	503	9.32%	5,394
Conway	2,618	61.15%	1,636	38.22%	27	0.63%	982	22.93%	4,281
Craighead	5,876	58.41%	4,035	40.11%	149	1.48%	1,841	18.30%	10,060
Crawford	2,723	46.60%	3,090	52.88%	30	0.51%	-367	-6.28%	5,843
Crittenden	2,120	43.51%	2,476	50.81%	277	5.68%	-356	-7.30%	4,873
Cross	2,165	63.36%	1,176	34.42%	76	2.22%	989	28.94%	3,417
Dallas	1,726	62.49%	984	35.63%	52	1.88%	742	26.86%	2,762
Desha	2,935	70.03%	1,204	28.73%	52	1.24%	1,731	41.30%	4,191
Drew	2,234	62.30%	1,265	35.28%	87	2.43%	969	27.02%	3,586
Faulkner	3,428	58.50%	2,399	40.94%	33	0.56%	1,029	17.56%	5,860
Franklin	1,614	58.25%	1,137	41.03%	20	0.72%	477	17.22%	2,771
Fulton	958	54.09%	799	45.12%	14	0.79%	159	8.97%	1,771
Garland	5,437	36.06%	9,427	62.53%	212	1.41%	-3,990	-26.47%	15,076
Grant	1,272	59.47%	818	38.24%	49	2.29%	454	21.23%	2,139
Greene	3,454	64.09%	1,898	35.22%	37	0.69%	1,556	28.87%	5,389
Hempstead	2,694	53.91%	2,227	44.57%	76	1.52%	467	9.34%	4,997
Hot Spring	3,525	54.21%	2,923	44.96%	54	0.83%	602	9.25%	6,502
Howard	1,428	51.27%	1,329	47.72%	28	1.01%	99	3.55%	2,785
Independence	2,316	49.46%	2,333	49.82%	34	0.73%	-17	-0.36%	4,683
Izard	1,200	69.93%	511	29.78%	5	0.29%	689	40.15%	1,716
Jackson	3,699	73.09%	1,323	26.14%	39	0.77%	2,376	46.95%	5,061
Jefferson	6,426	51.17%	5,743	45.73%	389	3.10%	683	5.44%	12,558
Johnson	1,697	52.30%	1,520	46.84%	28	0.86%	177	5.46%	3,245
Lafayette	1,348	59.12%	836	36.67%	96	4.21%	512	22.45%	2,280
Lawrence	2,303	58.33%	1,584	40.12%	61	1.55%	719	18.21%	3,948
Lee	1,719	61.09%	974	34.61%	121	4.30%	745	26.48%	2,814
Lincoln	1,616	67.19%	767	31.89%	22	0.91%	849	35.30%	2,405
Little River	1,308	59.51%	828	37.67%	62	2.82%	480	21.84%	2,198
Logan	2,307	52.29%	2,081	47.17%	24	0.54%	226	5.12%	4,412
Lonoke	3,234	60.61%	1,932	36.21%	170	3.19%	1,302	24.40%	5,336
Madison	2,186	46.35%	2,525	53.54%	5	0.11%	-339	-7.19%	4,716
Marion	1,061	55.20%	857	44.59%	4	0.21%	204	10.61%	1,922
Miller	5,402	54.09%	4,307	43.13%	278	2.78%	1,095	10.96%	9,987
Mississippi	6,428	58.68%	4,269	38.97%	258	2.36%	2,159	19.71%	10,955
Monroe	1,460	55.43%	1,099	41.72%	75	2.85%	361	13.71%	2,634
Montgomery	846	46.25%	965	52.76%	18	0.98%	-119	-6.51%	1,829
Nevada	1,871	63.57%	1,039	35.30%	33	1.12%	832	28.27%	2,943
Newton	832	35.92%	1,481	63.95%	3	0.13%	-649	-28.03%	2,316
Ouachita	5,188	63.82%	2,819	34.68%	122	1.50%	2,369	29.14%	8,129
Perry	719	55.14%	572	43.87%	13	1.00%	147	11.27%	1,304
Phillips	3,917	56.44%	2,826	40.72%	197	2.84%	1,091	15.72%	6,940
Pike	985	51.76%	905	47.56%	13	0.68%	80	4.20%	1,903
Poinsett	3,817	63.55%	2,117	35.25%	72	1.20%	1,700	28.30%	6,006
Polk	1,287	40.95%	1,832	58.29%	24	0.76%	-545	-17.34%	3,143
Pope	2,753	54.57%	2,267	44.94%	25	0.50%	486	9.63%	5,045
Prairie	1,504	61.64%	917	37.58%	19	0.78%	587	24.06%	2,440
Pulaski	23,372	46.46%	25,702	51.10%	1,227	2.44%	-2,330	-4.64%	50,301
Randolph	1,763	60.94%	1,117	38.61%	13	0.45%	646	22.33%	2,893
St. Francis	2,114	50.35%	1,884	44.87%	201	4.79%	230	5.48%	4,199
Saline	3,705	58.09%	2,603	40.81%	70	1.10%	1,102	17.28%	6,378
Scott	1,248	43.05%	1,637	56.47%	14	0.48%	-389	-13.42%	2,899
Searcy	909	26.94%	2,441	72.35%	24	0.71%	-1,532	-45.41%	3,374
Sebastian	7,489	41.98%	10,234	57.36%	118	0.66%	-2,745	-15.38%	17,841
Sevier	1,500	56.01%	1,159	43.28%	19	0.71%	341	12.73%	2,678
Sharp	927	57.94%	645	40.31%	28	1.75%	282	17.63%	1,600
Stone	756	53.58%	651	46.14%	4	0.28%	105	7.44%	1,411
Union	7,055	55.44%	5,059	39.75%	612	4.81%	1,996	15.69%	12,726
Van Buren	1,331	50.38%	1,296	49.05%	15	0.57%	35	1.33%	2,642
Washington	4,857	38.48%	7,683	60.87%	83	0.66%	-2,826	-22.39%	12,623
White	4,895	55.94%	3,813	43.58%	42	0.48%	1,082	12.36%	8,750
Woodruff	1,630	60.93%	992	37.08%	53	1.98%	638	23.85%	2,675
Yell	2,008	59.18%	1,381	40.70%	4	0.12%	627	18.48%	3,393
Totals	213,277	52.46%	186,287	45.82%	7,008	1.72%	26,990	6.64%	406,572

==== Counties that flipped from Democratic to Republican ====
- Baxter
- Crittenden
- Pulaski
- Scott

==== Counties that flipped from Republican to Democratic ====
- Stone

== See also ==
- United States presidential elections in Arkansas
