= 1880 United States presidential election in Arkansas =

- November 2, 1880
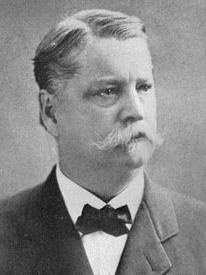

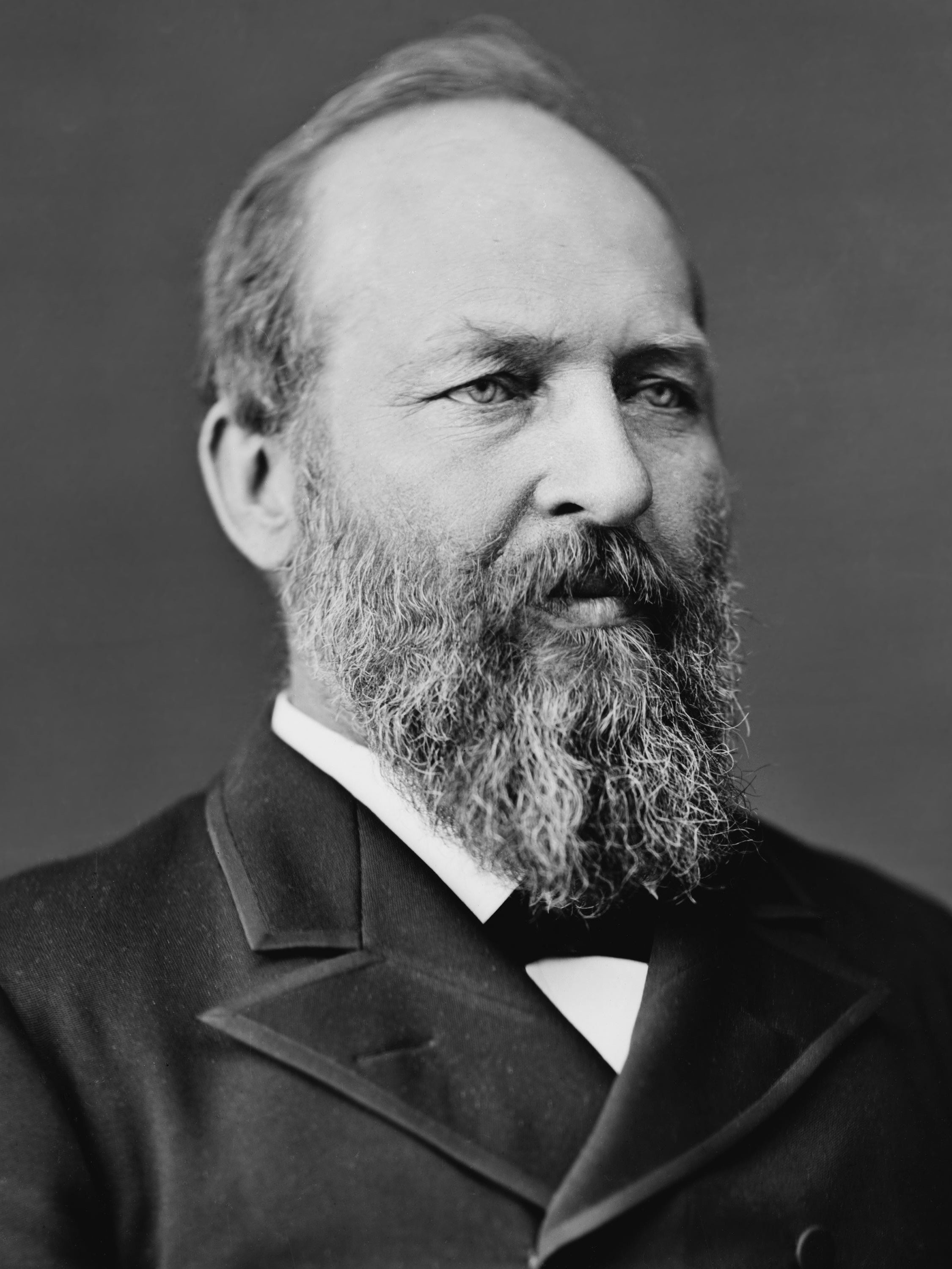
Nominee	Winfield Scott Hancock	James A. Garfield
Party	Democratic	Republican
Home state	Pennsylvania	Ohio
Running mate	William Hayden English	Chester A. Arthur
Electoral vote	6	0
Popular vote	60,489	41,661
Percentage	56.13%	38.66%
County results
Hancock
40–50%
50–60%
60–70%
70–80%
80–90%
90–100%
Garfield
40–50%
50–60%
60–70%
70–80%
80–90%
Weaver
40–50%
President before election
Rutherford B. Hayes
Republican
Elected President
James A. Garfield
Republican

The 1880 United States presidential election in Arkansas took place on November 2, 1880, as part of the 1880 United States presidential election. Voters chose six representatives, or electors, to the Electoral College, who voted for president and vice president.

Arkansas voted for the Democratic nominee, Winfield Scott Hancock, over the Republican nominee, James A. Garfield by a margin of 17.47%.

== Results ==
1880 United States presidential election in Arkansas
Party	Candidate	Running mate	Popular vote		Electoral vote	
Party	Candidate	Running mate	Count	%	Count	%
Democratic	Winfield Scott Hancock of Pennsylvania	William Hayden English of Arkansas	60,489	56.13%	6	100.00%
Republican	James Abram Garfield of Ohio	Chester Alan Arthur of New York	41,661	38.66%	0	0.00%
Greenback	James Baird Weaver of Iowa	Barzillai Jefferson Chambers of Texas	4,079	3.78%	0	0.00%
Write-in			1,221	1.13%	0	0.00%
Independent Democrat	A.C. Brewer of Arkansas	n/a of n/a	322	0.30%	0	0.00%
Total			107,772	100.00%	6	100.00%

== See also ==
- United States presidential elections in Arkansas
