= 1836 United States presidential election in Arkansas =

- November 7, 1836
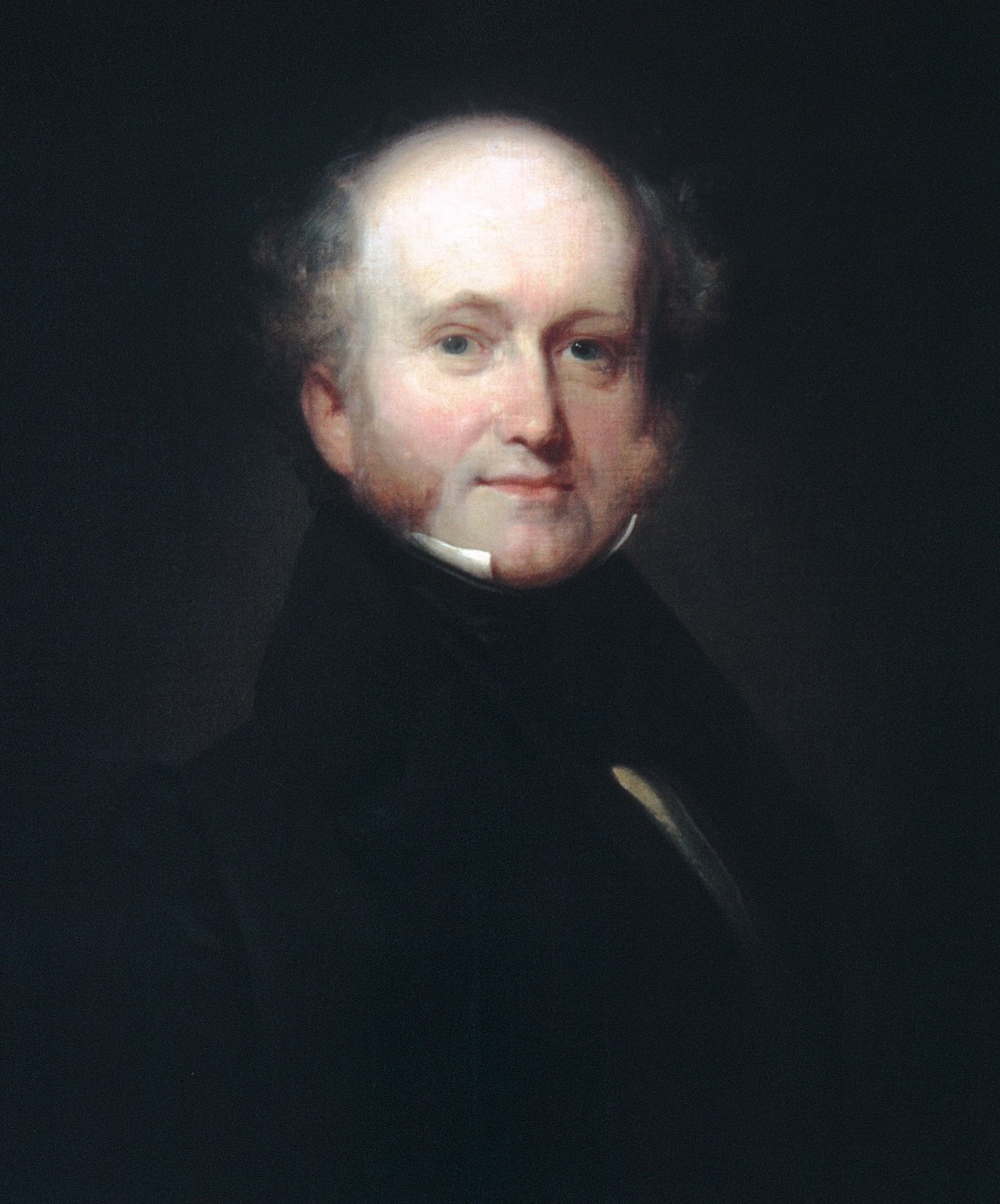

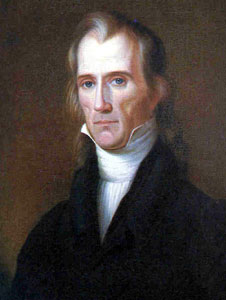
Nominee	Martin Van Buren	Hugh L. White
Party	Democratic	Whig
Home state	New York	Tennessee
Running mate	Richard Mentor Johnson	John Tyler
Electoral vote	3	0
Popular vote	2,380	1,334
Percentage	64.08%	35.92%
County results
Van Buren
50–60%
60–70%
70–80%
80–90%
90–100%
White
50–60%
60–70%
Unknown/No vote
President before election
Andrew Jackson
Democratic
Elected President
Martin Van Buren
Democratic

A presidential election was held in Arkansas on November 7, 1836, as part of the 1836 United States presidential election. Voters chose three representatives, or electors to the Electoral College, who voted for President and Vice President.

Arkansas, having been admitted to the Union as the 25th state on June 15, 1836, voted for the Democratic candidate, Martin Van Buren, over Whig candidate Hugh White during its first presidential election. Van Buren won Arkansas by a margin of 28.16%.

== Results ==
1836 United States presidential election in Arkansas
Party	Candidate	Votes	Percentage	Electoral votes
Democratic	Martin Van Buren	2,380	64.08%	3
Whig	Hugh White	1,334	35.92%	0
Totals		3,714	100.00%	3

=== Results By County ===
1836 United States Presidential Election in Arkansas (By County)
County	Martin Van Buren Democratic		Hugh Lawson White Whig		Total
County	#	%	#	%	Total
Arkansas	38	31.67%	82	68.33%	120
Carroll	73	92.41%	6	7.59%	79
Chicot	43	45.74%	51	54.26%	94
Clark	41	85.42%	7	14.58%	48
Conway	23	32.39%	48	67.61%	71
Crawford	109	47.81%	119	52.19%	228
Crittenden	38	58.46%	27	41.54%	65
Hempstead	110	56.99%	83	43.01%	193
Hot Spring	11	68.75%	5	31.25%	16
Independence	134	54.25%	113	45.75%	247
Izard	87	85.29%	15	14.71%	102
Jackson	56	53.85%	48	46.15%	104
Jefferson	50	51.02%	48	48.98%	98
Johnson	107	72.79%	40	27.21%	147
Lafayette	30	73.17%	11	26.83%	41
Lawrence	82	72.57%	31	27.43%	113
Monroe	17	32.69%	35	67.31%	52
Phillips	96	59.63%	65	40.37%	161
Pike	33	100.00%	0	0.00%	33
Pope	93	66.91%	46	33.09%	139
Pulaski	234	55.06%	191	44.94%	425
Randolph	138	89.03%	17	10.97%	155
Saline	81	60.90%	52	39.10%	133
Sevier	67	66.34%	34	33.66%	101
St. Francis	108	85.71%	18	14.29%	126
Van Buren	19	67.86%	9	32.14%	28
Washington	622	82.38%	133	17.62%	755
White	17	36.96%	29	63.04%	46
Totals	2,380	64.08%	1,334	35.92%	3,714

== See also ==
- United States presidential elections in Arkansas
