= 1856 United States presidential election in Arkansas =

- November 4, 1856
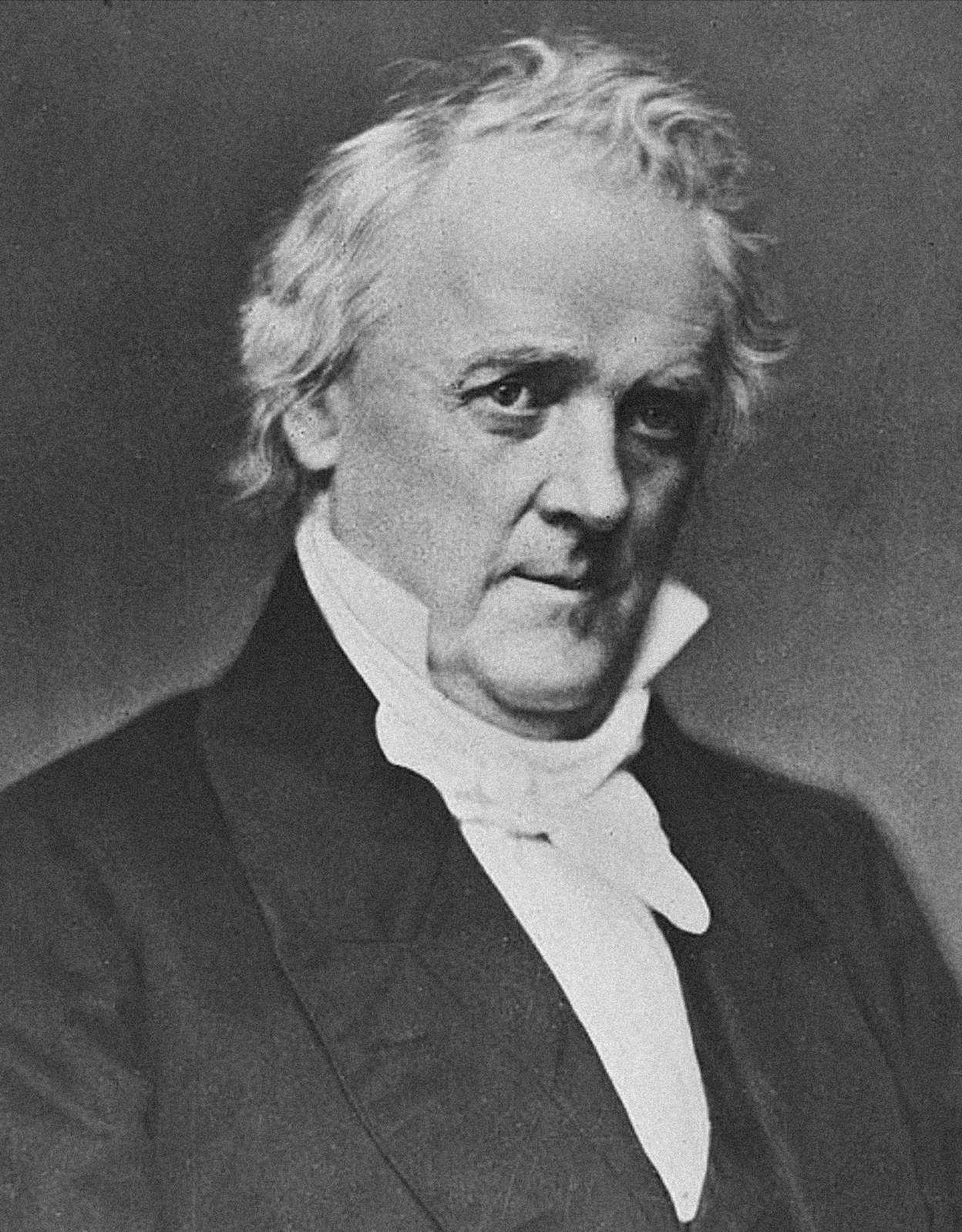

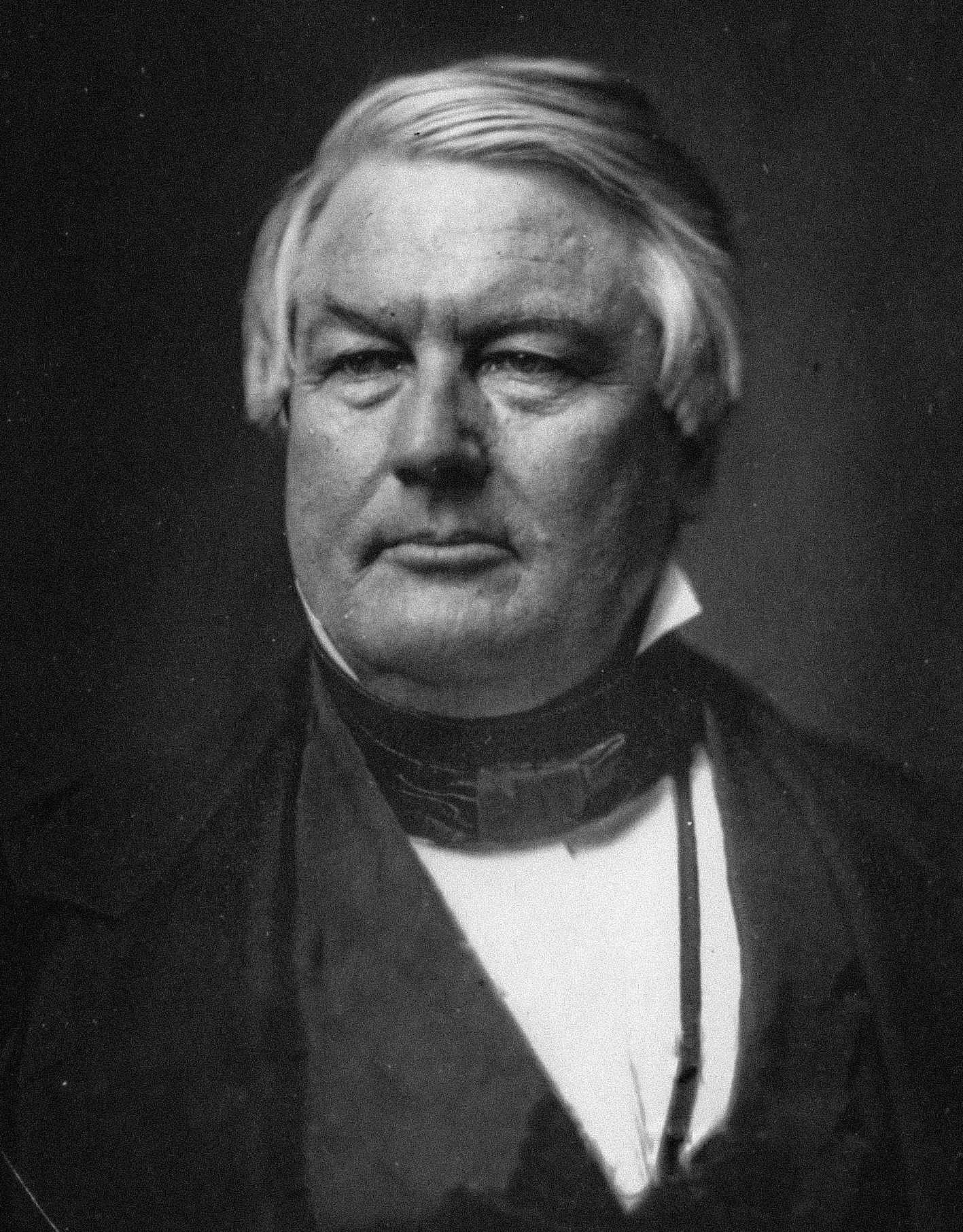
Nominee	James Buchanan	Millard Fillmore
Party	Democratic	Know Nothing
Home state	Pennsylvania	New York
Running mate	John C. Breckinridge	Andrew Jackson Donelson
Electoral vote	4	0
Popular vote	21,910	10,732
Percentage	67.12%	32.88%
County results
Buchanan
50–60%
60–70%
70–80%
80–90%
90–100%
Fillmore
50–60%
No Vote:
President before election
Franklin Pierce
Democratic
Elected President
James Buchanan
Democratic

The 1856 United States presidential election in Arkansas was held on November 4, 1856. Arkansas voters chose four electors to represent the state in the Electoral College, which chose the president and vice president.

Arkansas voted for the Democratic nominee James Buchanan, who received 67% of the vote. Buchanan won every county that has data available except for Sebastian.

Republican Party nominee John C. Frémont was not on the ballot.

== Results ==
1856 United States presidential election in Arkansas
Party	Candidate	Votes	%
Democratic	James Buchanan	21,910	67.12%
Know Nothing	Millard Fillmore	10,732	32.88%
Total votes		32,642	100%

== See also ==
- United States presidential elections in Arkansas
