= 1876 United States presidential election in Arkansas =

- November 7, 1876
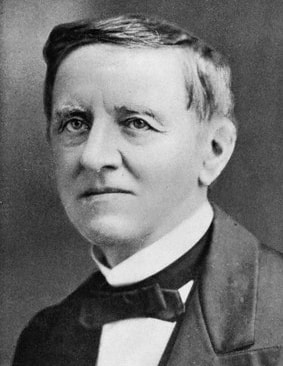

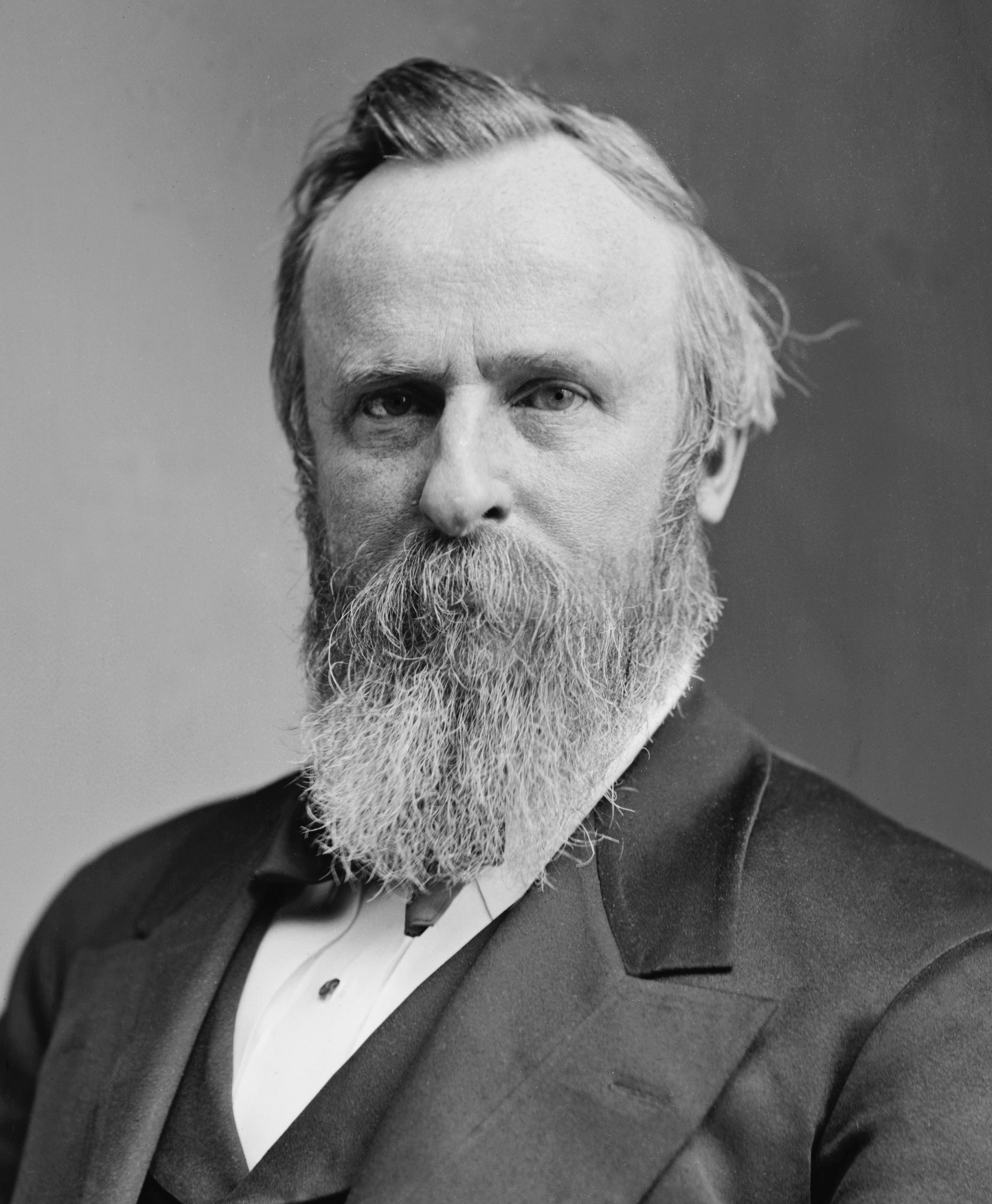
Nominee	Samuel J. Tilden	Rutherford B. Hayes
Party	Democratic	Republican
Home state	New York	Ohio
Running mate	Thomas A. Hendricks	William A. Wheeler
Electoral vote	6	0
Popular vote	58,086	38,649
Percentage	59.92%	39.87%
County results
Tilden
50–60%
60–70%
70–80%
80–90%
90–100%
Hayes
50–60%
60–70%
70–80%
President before election
Ulysses S. Grant
Republican
Elected President
Rutherford B. Hayes
Republican

The 1876 United States presidential election in Arkansas took place on November 7, 1876, as part of the 1876 United States presidential election. Voters chose six representatives, or electors, to the Electoral College, who voted for president and vice president.

Arkansas voted for the Democratic candidate, Samuel J. Tilden, over Republican candidate, Rutherford B. Hayes. Tilden won Arkansas by a margin of 20.05%.

== Results ==
1876 United States presidential election in Arkansas
Party	Candidate	Running mate	Popular vote		Electoral vote	
Party	Candidate	Running mate	Count	%	Count	%
Democratic	Samuel J. Tilden of New York	Thomas A. Hendricks of Indiana	58,086	59.92%	6	100.00%
Republican	Rutherford B. Hayes of Ohio	William A. Wheeler of New York	38,649	39.87%	0	0.00%
Greenback	Peter Cooper of New York	Samuel Fenton Cary of Ohio	211	0.22%	0	0.00%
Total			96,946	100.00%	6	100.00%

== See also ==
- United States presidential elections in Arkansas
