= 1840 United States presidential election in Arkansas =

- November 2, 1840
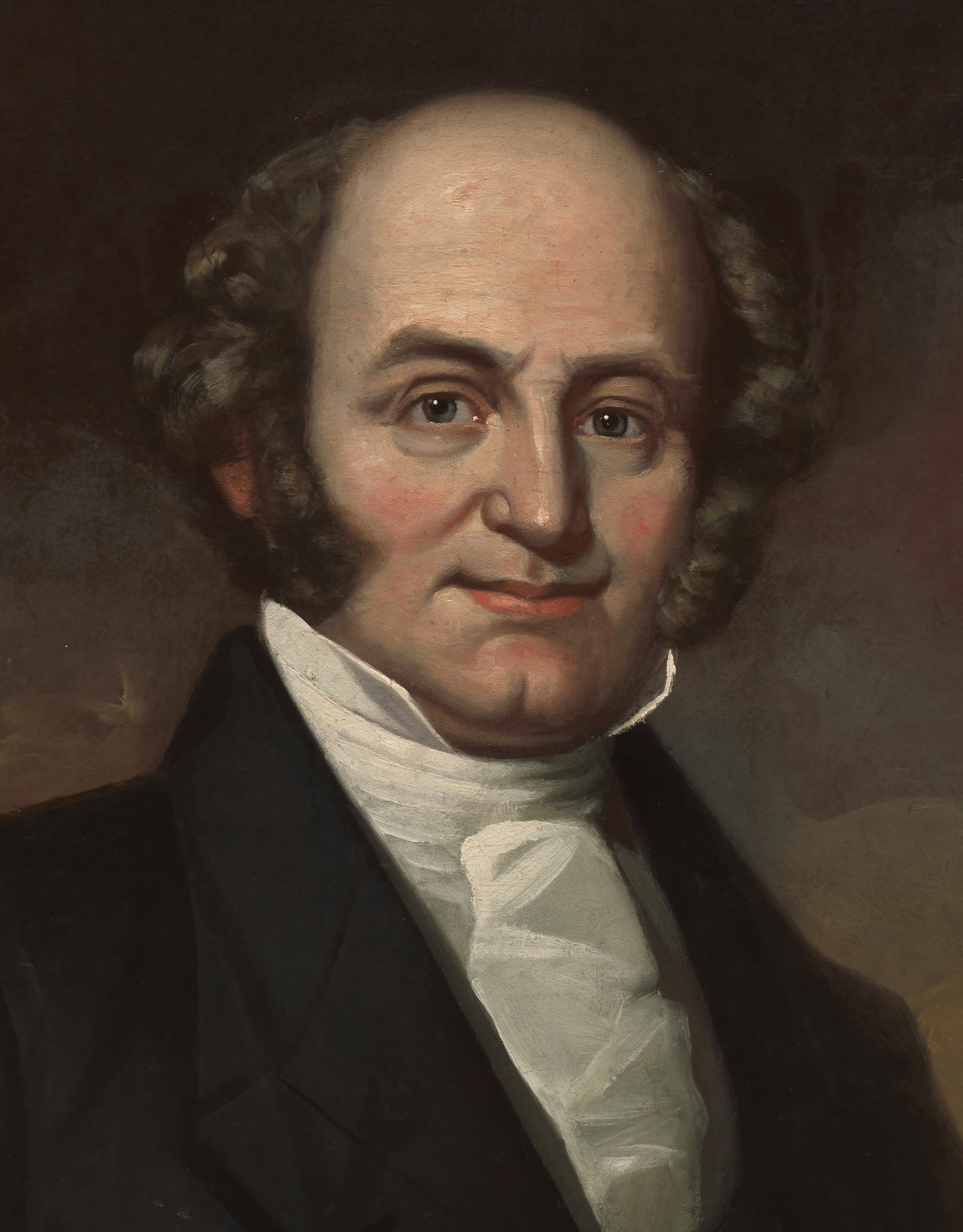

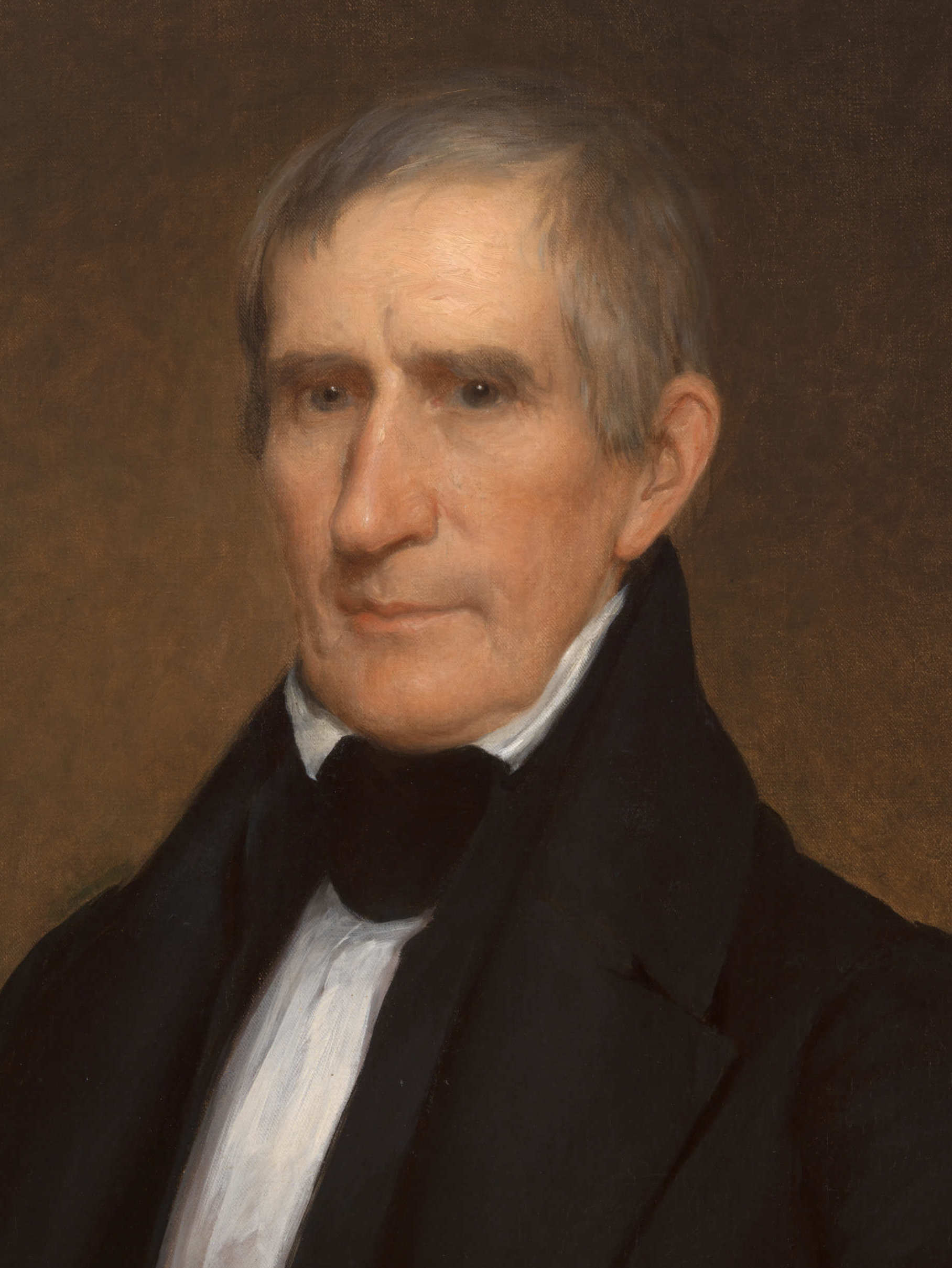
Nominee	Martin Van Buren	William H. Harrison
Party	Democratic	Whig
Home state	New York	Ohio
Running mate	Richard Mentor Johnson	John Tyler
Electoral vote	3	0
Popular vote	6,679	5,160
Percentage	56.42%	43.58%
County results
Van Buren
50–60%
60–70%
70–80%
80–90%
90–100%
Harrison
50–60%
60–70%
70–80%
80–90%
Unknown/No vote
President before election
Martin Van Buren
Democratic
Elected President
William H. Harrison
Whig

A presidential election was held in Arkansas on November 2, 1840 as part of the 1840 United States presidential election. Voters chose three representatives, or electors to the Electoral College, who voted for President and Vice President.

Arkansas voted for the Democratic candidate, Martin Van Buren, over Whig candidate William Henry Harrison. Van Buren won Arkansas by a margin of 12.84%.

== Results ==
1840 United States presidential election in Arkansas
Party	Candidate	Running mate	Popular vote		Electoral vote	
Party	Candidate	Running mate	Count	%	Count	%
Democratic	Martin Van Buren of New York	Richard Mentor Johnson of Kentucky	6,679	56.42%	3	100.00%
Whig	William Henry Harrison of Ohio	John Tyler of Virginia	5,160	43.58%	0	0.00%
Total			11,839	100.00%	3	100.00%

== See also ==
- United States presidential elections in Arkansas
