= 1952 United States presidential election in Arkansas =

- November 4, 1952

All 8 Arkansas votes to the Electoral College

Nominee	Adlai Stevenson	Dwight D. Eisenhower
Party	Democratic	Republican
Home state	Illinois	New York
Running mate	John Sparkman	Richard Nixon
Electoral vote	8	0
Popular vote	226,300	177,155
Percentage	55.90%	43.76%

Stevenson
40–50%
50–60%
60–70%
70–80%
80–90%
Eisenhower
40–50%
50–60%
60–70%
President before election
Harry S. Truman
Democratic
Elected President
Dwight D. Eisenhower
Republican

The 1952 United States presidential election in Arkansas took place on November 4, 1952, as part of the 1952 United States presidential election. State voters chose eight representatives, or electors, to the Electoral College, who voted for president and vice president.

Arkansas was won by Adlai Stevenson (D–Illinois), running with Senator John Sparkman, with 55.90% of the popular vote, against Columbia University President Dwight D. Eisenhower (R–New York), running with Senator Richard Nixon, with 43.76% of the popular vote.

== Results ==
1952 United States presidential election in Arkansas
Party	Candidate	Votes	%
Democratic	Adlai Stevenson	226,300	55.90%
Republican	Dwight D. Eisenhower	177,155	43.76%
Prohibition	Stuart Hamblen	886	0.22%
Christian Nationalist	Douglas MacArthur	458	0.11%
Write-in	Eric Hass	1	0.00%
Total votes		404,800	100.00%

=== Results by county ===
County	Adlai Stevenson Democratic		Dwight D. Eisenhower Republican		Various candidates Other parties		Margin		Total votes cast
County	#	%	#	%	#	%	#	%	Total votes cast
Arkansas	2,648	49.42%	2,697	50.34%	13	0.24%	-49	-0.92%	5,358
Ashley	3,471	73.40%	1,249	26.41%	9	0.19%	2,222	46.99%	4,729
Baxter	1,388	49.70%	1,387	49.66%	18	0.64%	1	0.04%	2,793
Benton	3,558	30.94%	7,916	68.83%	26	0.23%	-4,358	-37.89%	11,500
Boone	2,786	45.26%	3,361	54.61%	8	0.13%	-575	-9.35%	6,155
Bradley	2,417	73.31%	869	26.36%	11	0.33%	1,548	46.95%	3,297
Calhoun	1,332	82.89%	272	16.93%	3	0.19%	1,060	65.96%	1,607
Carroll	1,493	35.06%	2,752	64.63%	13	0.31%	-1,259	-29.57%	4,258
Chicot	2,458	67.10%	1,191	32.51%	14	0.38%	1,267	34.59%	3,663
Clark	2,963	63.76%	1,679	36.13%	5	0.11%	1,284	27.63%	4,647
Clay	2,277	51.66%	2,105	47.75%	26	0.59%	172	3.91%	4,408
Cleburne	1,045	53.02%	918	46.58%	8	0.41%	127	6.44%	1,971
Cleveland	1,248	72.22%	477	27.60%	3	0.17%	771	44.62%	1,728
Columbia	3,359	63.39%	1,931	36.44%	9	0.17%	1,428	26.95%	5,299
Conway	3,174	59.70%	2,133	40.12%	10	0.19%	1,041	19.58%	5,317
Craighead	5,975	58.57%	4,199	41.16%	28	0.27%	1,776	17.41%	10,202
Crawford	2,477	47.01%	2,782	52.80%	10	0.19%	-305	-5.79%	5,269
Crittenden	2,982	61.31%	1,865	38.34%	17	0.35%	1,117	22.97%	4,864
Cross	2,344	61.41%	1,461	38.28%	12	0.31%	883	23.13%	3,817
Dallas	2,202	74.80%	737	25.03%	5	0.17%	1,465	49.77%	2,944
Desha	3,150	75.14%	1,037	24.74%	5	0.12%	2,113	50.40%	4,192
Drew	2,261	68.39%	1,040	31.46%	5	0.15%	1,221	36.93%	3,306
Faulkner	3,461	63.27%	1,995	36.47%	14	0.26%	1,466	26.80%	5,470
Franklin	1,762	59.09%	1,215	40.74%	5	0.17%	547	18.35%	2,982
Fulton	1,048	54.08%	890	45.92%	0	0.00%	158	8.16%	1,938
Garland	5,165	39.53%	7,848	60.07%	52	0.40%	-2,683	-20.54%	13,065
Grant	1,487	69.65%	637	29.84%	11	0.52%	850	39.81%	2,135
Greene	3,571	65.43%	1,875	34.35%	12	0.22%	1,696	31.08%	5,458
Hempstead	2,771	56.70%	2,115	43.28%	1	0.02%	656	13.42%	4,887
Hot Spring	3,474	65.17%	1,842	34.55%	15	0.28%	1,632	30.62%	5,331
Howard	1,492	61.07%	944	38.64%	7	0.29%	548	22.43%	2,443
Independence	2,485	49.67%	2,499	49.95%	19	0.38%	-14	-0.28%	5,003
Izard	1,085	63.27%	629	36.68%	1	0.06%	456	26.59%	1,715
Jackson	4,401	74.38%	1,516	25.62%	0	0.00%	2,885	48.76%	5,917
Jefferson	8,300	58.24%	5,925	41.57%	27	0.19%	2,375	16.67%	14,252
Johnson	2,021	53.68%	1,728	45.90%	16	0.42%	293	7.78%	3,765
Lafayette	1,637	68.61%	733	30.72%	16	0.67%	904	37.89%	2,386
Lawrence	2,206	57.39%	1,570	40.84%	68	1.77%	636	16.55%	3,844
Lee	1,923	64.36%	1,054	35.27%	11	0.37%	869	29.09%	2,988
Lincoln	1,871	75.69%	595	24.07%	6	0.24%	1,276	51.62%	2,472
Little River	1,522	65.94%	783	33.93%	3	0.13%	739	32.01%	2,308
Logan	2,567	54.75%	2,103	44.85%	19	0.41%	464	9.90%	4,689
Lonoke	3,517	69.04%	1,570	30.82%	7	0.14%	1,947	38.22%	5,094
Madison	2,110	42.31%	2,868	57.51%	9	0.18%	-758	-15.20%	4,987
Marion	1,099	56.07%	844	43.06%	17	0.87%	255	13.01%	1,960
Miller	5,337	62.72%	3,137	36.87%	35	0.41%	2,200	25.85%	8,509
Mississippi	6,968	60.24%	4,586	39.65%	13	0.11%	2,382	20.59%	11,567
Monroe	1,834	65.95%	947	34.05%	0	0.00%	887	31.90%	2,781
Montgomery	807	49.75%	815	50.25%	0	0.00%	-8	-0.50%	1,622
Nevada	1,972	65.43%	1,037	34.41%	5	0.17%	935	31.02%	3,014
Newton	1,107	39.01%	1,728	60.89%	3	0.11%	-621	-21.88%	2,838
Ouachita	5,936	72.96%	2,171	26.68%	29	0.36%	3,765	46.28%	8,136
Perry	802	61.22%	502	38.32%	6	0.46%	300	22.90%	1,310
Phillips	3,741	59.01%	2,592	40.88%	7	0.11%	1,149	18.13%	6,340
Pike	1,163	60.01%	742	38.29%	33	1.70%	421	21.72%	1,938
Poinsett	4,303	68.07%	2,010	31.80%	8	0.13%	2,293	36.27%	6,321
Polk	1,379	43.90%	1,756	55.91%	6	0.19%	-377	-12.01%	3,141
Pope	3,036	57.65%	2,226	42.27%	4	0.08%	810	15.38%	5,266
Prairie	1,664	65.49%	871	34.28%	6	0.24%	793	31.21%	2,541
Pulaski	24,448	50.63%	23,460	48.59%	378	0.78%	988	2.04%	48,286
Randolph	1,941	59.65%	1,302	40.01%	11	0.34%	639	19.64%	3,254
St. Francis	2,466	57.90%	1,792	42.08%	1	0.02%	674	15.82%	4,259
Saline	4,045	68.99%	1,766	30.12%	52	0.89%	2,279	38.87%	5,863
Scott	1,197	56.97%	893	42.50%	11	0.52%	304	14.47%	2,101
Searcy	1,007	33.52%	1,996	66.44%	1	0.03%	-989	-32.92%	3,004
Sebastian	7,802	43.48%	10,114	56.36%	28	0.16%	-2,312	-12.88%	17,944
Sevier	1,673	59.64%	1,130	40.29%	2	0.07%	543	19.35%	2,805
Sharp	1,039	61.23%	655	38.60%	3	0.18%	384	22.63%	1,697
Stone	573	44.98%	700	54.95%	1	0.08%	-127	-9.97%	1,274
Union	7,515	58.67%	5,266	41.11%	29	0.23%	2,249	17.56%	12,810
Van Buren	1,559	50.26%	1,530	49.32%	13	0.42%	29	0.94%	3,102
Washington	4,923	36.17%	8,650	63.55%	38	0.28%	-3,727	-27.38%	13,611
White	4,179	59.11%	2,884	40.79%	7	0.10%	1,295	18.32%	7,070
Woodruff	2,017	71.05%	818	28.81%	4	0.14%	1,199	42.24%	2,839
Yell	1,884	59.92%	1,243	39.54%	17	0.54%	641	20.38%	3,144
Totals	226,300	55.90%	177,155	43.76%	1,345	0.33%	49,145	12.14%	404,800

==== Counties that flipped from Democratic to Republican ====
- Arkansas
- Benton
- Boone
- Carroll
- Crawford
- Garland
- Independence
- Montgomery
- Polk
- Searcy
- Sebastian
- Stone
- Washington

==== Counties that flipped from Dixiecrat to Democratic ====
- Crittenden
- Lee
- Phillips

== See also ==
- United States presidential elections in Arkansas
