= 1852 United States presidential election in Arkansas =

- November 2, 1852

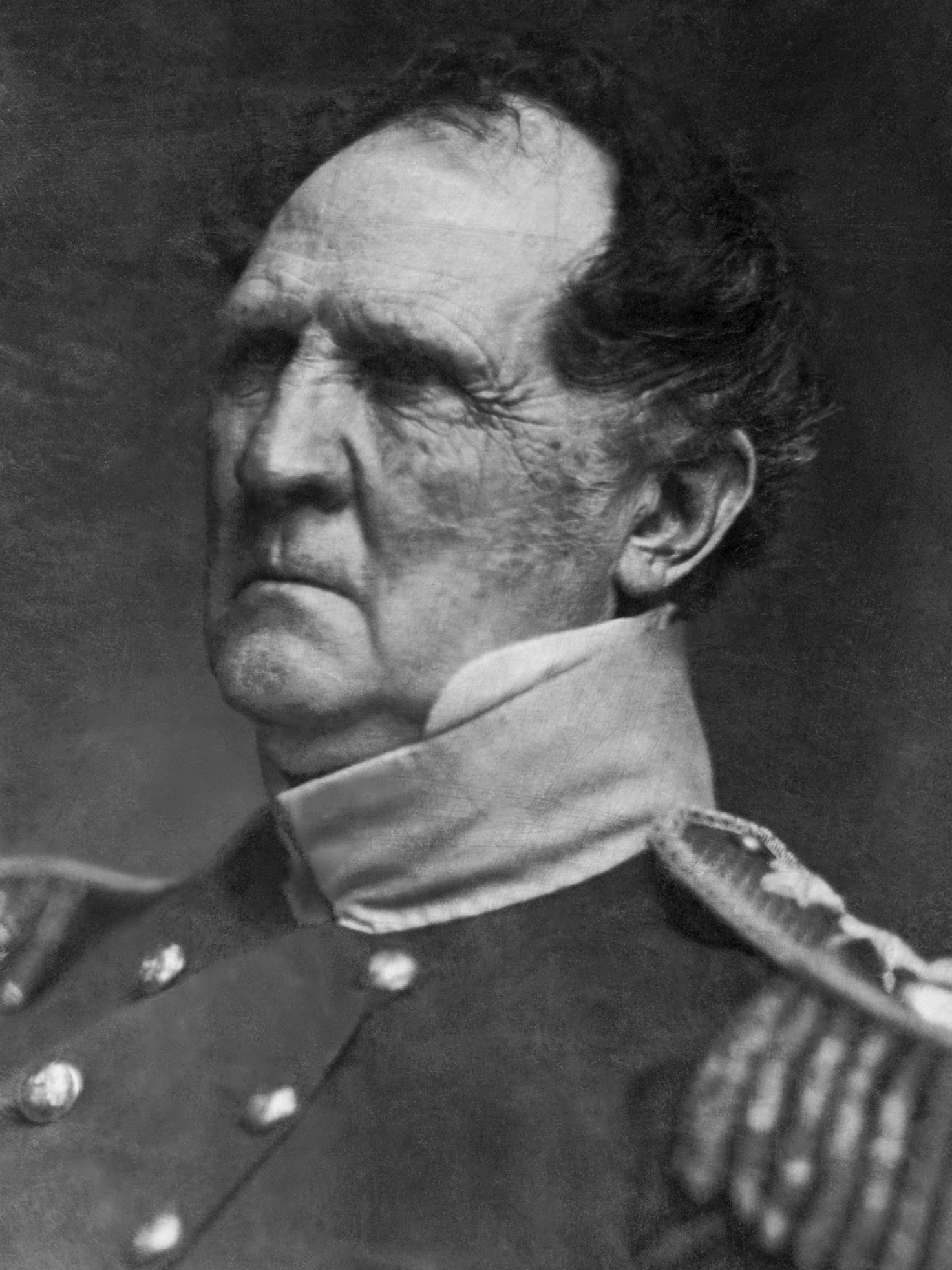
Nominee	Franklin Pierce	Winfield Scott
Party	Democratic	Whig
Home state	New Hampshire	New Jersey
Running mate	William R. King	William Alexander Graham
Electoral vote	4	0
Popular vote	12,173	7,404
Percentage	62.18%	37.82%
County results
Pierce
50–60%
60–70%
70–80%
80–90%
90–100%
Scott
50–60%
No Vote:
President before election
Millard Fillmore
Whig
Elected President
Franklin Pierce
Democratic

The 1852 United States presidential election in Arkansas took place on November 2, 1852, as part of the 1852 United States presidential election. Voters chose four representatives, or electors to the Electoral College, who voted for president and vice president.

Arkansas voted for the Democratic candidate, Franklin Pierce, over Whig candidate Winfield Scott. Pierce won Arkansas by a margin of 24.36%.

== Results ==
1852 United States presidential election in Arkansas
Party	Candidate	Running mate	Popular vote		Electoral vote	
Party	Candidate	Running mate	Count	%	Count	%
Democratic	Franklin Pierce of New Hampshire	William R. King of Alabama	12,173	62.18%	4	100.00%
Whig	Winfield Scott of New Jersey	William Alexander Graham of North Carolina	7,404	37.82%	0	0.00%
Total			19,577	100.00%	4	100.00%

== See also ==
- United States presidential elections in Arkansas
