= 1860 United States presidential election in Arkansas =

- November 6, 1860
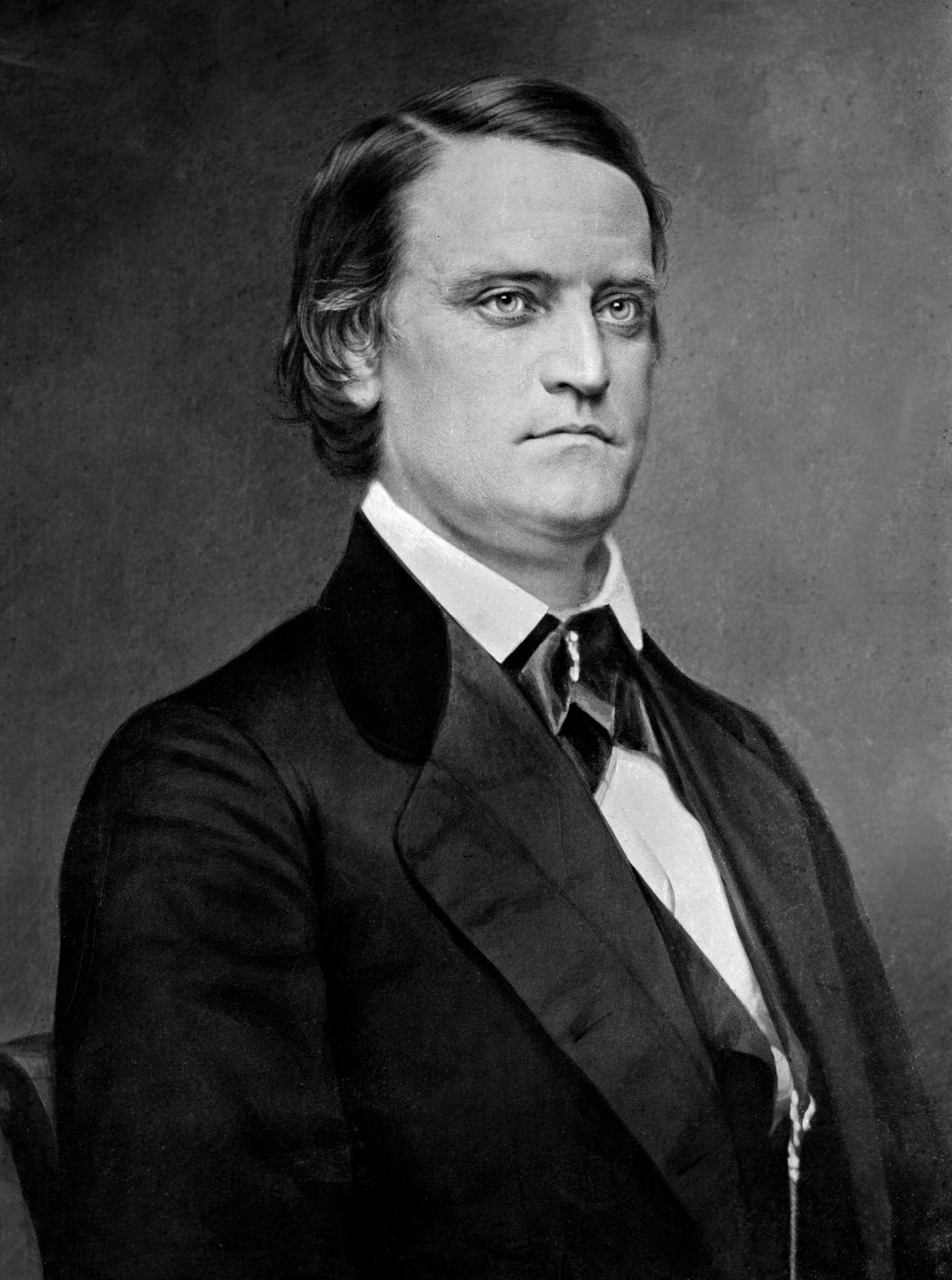

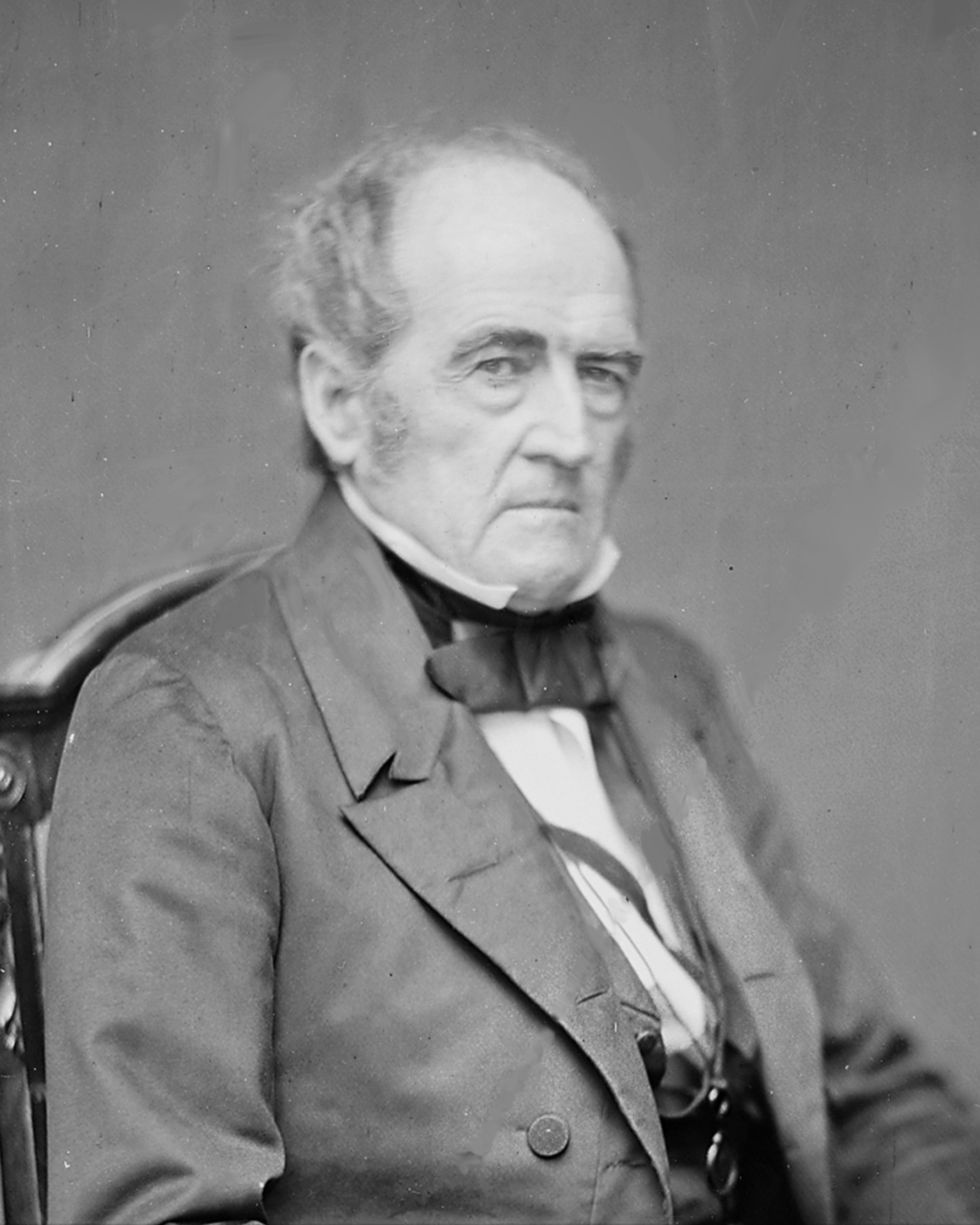

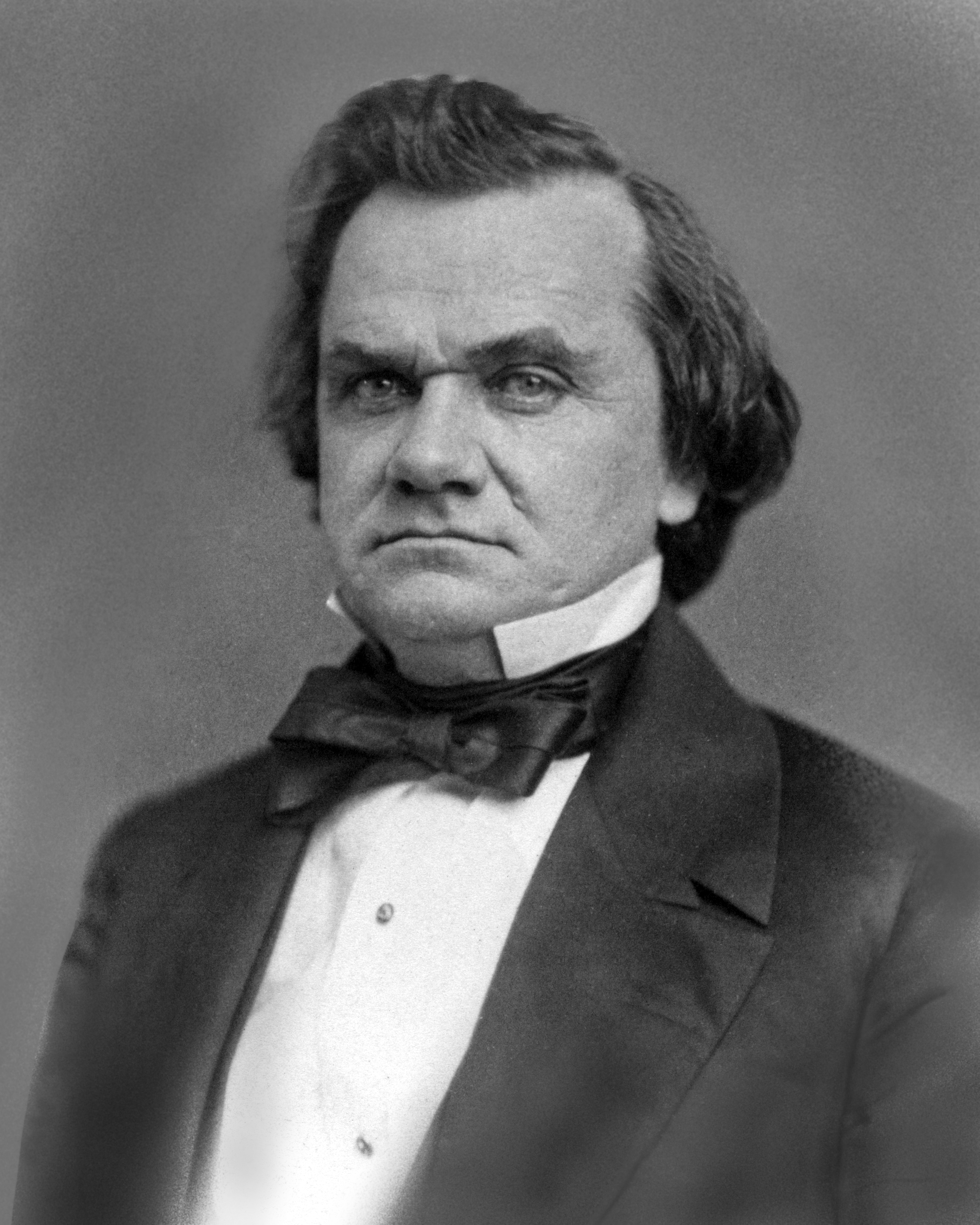
Nominee	John C. Breckinridge	John Bell	Stephen A. Douglas
Party	Southern Democratic	Constitutional Union	Democratic
Home state	Kentucky	Tennessee	Illinois
Running mate	Joseph Lane	Edward Everett	Herschel V. Johnson
Electoral vote	4	0	0
Popular vote	28,732	20,063	5,357
Percentage	53.06%	37.05%	9.89%
County results
Breckenridge
30–40%
40–50%
50–60%
60–70%
70–80%
80–90%
Bell
40–50%
50–60%
Unknown/No Vote
President before election
James Buchanan
Democratic
Elected President
Abraham Lincoln
Republican

The 1860 United States presidential election in Arkansas took place on November 6, 1860, as part of the 1860 United States presidential election. Arkansas voters chose four representatives, or electors, to the Electoral College, who voted for president and vice president.

Arkansas was won by the Southern Democratic candidate 14th Vice President of the United States John C. Breckinridge of Kentucky and his running mate Senator Joseph Lane of Oregon. They defeated the Constitutional Union candidate Senator John Bell of Tennessee and his running mate Governor of Massachusetts Edward Everett as well as Democratic candidate Senator Stephen A. Douglas of Illinois and his running mate 41st Governor of Georgia Herschel V. Johnson. Breckinridge won the state by a margin of 16.01%.

The Republican Party and its candidate Abraham Lincoln did not have significant ballot distribution in the state.

== Results ==
1860 United States presidential election in Arkansas
Party	Candidate	Votes	%
Southern Democratic	John C. Breckinridge	28,732	53.06%
Constitutional Union	John Bell	20,063	37.05%
Democratic	Stephen A. Douglas	5,357	9.89%
Total votes		54,152	100%

=== Results By County ===
1860 United States Presidential Election in Arkansas (By County) (Note: Randolph County had no returns.)
County	John C. Breckinridge Southern Democratic		John Bell Constitutional Union		Stephen A. Douglas Democratic		Total Votes Cast
County	#	%	#	%	#	%	Total Votes Cast
Arkansas	426	47.44%	417	46.44%	55	6.12%	898
Ashley	604	58.13%	422	40.62%	13	1.25%	1,039
Benton	702	54.72%	328	25.57%	253	19.72%	1,283
Bradley	633	57.08%	440	39.68%	36	3.25%	1,109
Calhoun	398	63.17%	204	32.38%	28	4.44%	630
Carroll	791	66.75%	368	31.05%	26	2.19%	1,185
Chicot	231	45.12%	253	49.41%	28	5.47%	512
Clark	804	60.18%	500	37.43%	32	2.40%	1,336
Columbia	839	49.56%	716	42.29%	138	8.15%	1,693
Conway	549	59.22%	326	35.17%	52	5.61%	927
Crawford	244	25.03%	374	38.36%	357	36.62%	975
Crittenden	88	16.99%	257	49.61%	173	33.40%	518
Craighead	319	59.96%	193	36.28%	20	3.76%	532
Dallas	513	55.27%	371	39.51%	55	5.86%	939
Desha	287	40.20%	312	43.70%	115	16.11%	714
Drew	772	54.52%	560	39.55%	84	5.93%	1,416
Franklin	666	67.07%	283	28.50%	44	4.43%	993
Fulton	252	72.83%	38	10.98%	56	16.18%	346
Greene	328	75.23%	60	13.76%	48	11.01%	436
Hempstead	762	46.32%	675	41.03%	208	12.64%	1,645
Hot Spring	451	61.53%	237	32.33%	45	6.14%	733
Independence	722	38.08%	893	47.10%	281	14.82%	1,896
Izard	524	56.77%	271	29.36%	128	13.87%	923
Jackson	762	49.58%	722	46.97%	53	3.45%	1,537
Jefferson	664	38.92%	600	35.17%	442	25.91%	1,706
Johnson	780	77.69%	210	20.92%	14	1.39%	1,004
Lafayette	486	61.75%	290	36.85%	11	1.40%	787
Lawrence	906	61.55%	474	32.20%	92	6.25%	1,472
Madison	626	71.62%	176	20.14%	72	8.24%	874
Marion	527	64.03%	232	28.19%	64	7.78%	823
Mississippi	83	23.78%	176	50.43%	90	25.79%	349
Monroe	301	47.25%	286	44.90%	50	7.85%	637
Montgomery	360	84.91%	60	14.15%	4	0.94%	424
Newton	315	78.55%	67	16.71%	19	4.74%	401
Ouachita	929	51.90%	779	43.52%	82	4.58%	1,790
Perry	149	53.02%	82	29.18%	50	17.79%	281
Phillips	619	48.10%	606	47.09%	62	4.82%	1,287
Pike	294	69.67%	51	12.09%	77	18.25%	422
Poinsett	253	62.01%	102	25.00%	53	12.99%	408
Polk	254	86.69%	11	3.75%	28	9.56%	293
Pope	663	61.90%	396	36.97%	12	1.12%	1,071
Prairie	673	46.83%	651	45.30%	113	7.86%	1,437
Pulaski	819	43.33%	899	47.57%	172	9.10%	1,890
Saline	556	59.09%	337	35.81%	48	5.10%	941
Scott	363	61.01%	159	26.72%	73	12.27%	595
Searcy	276	46.78%	197	33.39%	117	19.83%	590
Sebastian	575	39.99%	544	37.83%	319	22.18%	1,438
Sevier	754	61.75%	361	29.57%	106	8.68%	1,221
St. Francis	416	37.44%	414	37.26%	281	25.29%	1,111
Union	757	50.53%	663	44.26%	78	5.21%	1,498
Van Buren	504	62.76%	248	30.88%	51	6.35%	803
Washington	1,028	47.75%	881	40.92%	244	11.33%	2,153
White	602	45.47%	582	43.96%	140	10.57%	1,324
Yell	533	58.77%	309	34.07%	65	7.17%	907
Total	28,732	53.16%	20,094	37.17%	5,227	9.67%	54,053

== See also ==
- United States presidential elections in Arkansas
