= National Register of Historic Places listings in Calhoun County, Arkansas =

Location of Calhoun County in Arkansas

This is a list of the National Register of Historic Places listings in Calhoun County, Arkansas.

This is intended to be a complete list of the properties on the National Register of Historic Places in Calhoun County, Arkansas, United States. The locations of National Register properties for which the latitude and longitude coordinates are included below, may be seen in a map.

There are 10 properties listed on the National Register in the county, and two former listings.

Contents: Counties in Arkansas
- Arkansas
- Ashley
- Baxter
- Benton
- Boone
- Bradley
- Calhoun
- Carroll
- Chicot
- Clark
- Clay
- Cleburne
- Cleveland
- Columbia
- Conway
- Craighead
- Crawford
- Crittenden
- Cross
- Dallas
- Desha
- Drew
- Faulkner
- Franklin
- Fulton
- Garland
- Grant
- Greene
- Hempstead
- Hot Spring
- Howard
- Independence
- Izard
- Jackson
- Jefferson
- Johnson
- Lafayette
- Lawrence
- Lee
- Lincoln
- Little River
- Logan
- Lonoke
- Madison
- Marion
- Miller
- Mississippi
- Monroe
- Montgomery
- Nevada
- Newton
- Ouachita
- Perry
- Phillips
- Pike
- Poinsett
- Polk
- Pope
- Prairie
- Pulaski (Little Rock)
- Randolph
- St. Francis
- Saline
- Scott
- Searcy
- Sebastian
- Sevier
- Sharp
- Stone
- Union
- Van Buren
- Washington
- White
- Woodruff
- Yell

This National Park Service list is complete through NPS recent listings posted January 16, 2026.

== Current listings ==
| | Name on the Register | Image | Date listed | Location | City or town | Description |
|---|---|---|---|---|---|---|
| 1 | Boone's Mounds | Boone's Mounds | April 14, 1980 (#80000774) | Address Restricted | Calion | |
| 2 | Calhoun County Courthouse | Calhoun County Courthouse | December 12, 1976 (#76000390) | Courthouse Sq. 33°32′15″N 92°28′19″W | Hampton | |
| 3 | Dunn House | Dunn House | May 4, 1976 (#76000391) | West of Hampton on U.S. Route 278; 33°32′10″N 92°31′10″W | Hampton | |
| 4 | Hampton Cemetery | Hampton Cemetery | May 27, 2009 (#09000340) | South of the junction of U.S. Route 278, W. and 1st St. 33°32′18″N 92°28′23″W | Hampton | |
| 5 | Hampton Masonic Lodge Building | Hampton Masonic Lodge Building | May 20, 2008 (#08000433) | 115 S. 2nd St. 33°31′51″N 92°28′22″W | Hampton | |
| 6 | Hampton Waterworks | Hampton Waterworks | October 5, 2006 (#06000909) | Hunt St., west of Lee St. 33°32′21″N 92°28′14″W | Hampton | |
| 7 | Keller Site | | October 29, 1979 (#79000434) | Address Restricted | Calion | |
| 8 | Ouachita River Lock and Dam No. 8 | Ouachita River Lock and Dam No. 8 | December 19, 1983 (#83003458) | Southeast of Calion; 33°18′03″N 92°27′41″W | Calion | |
| 9 | Shumaker Naval Ammunition Depot (NAD) 500-Man Barracks | | May 21, 2018 (#100002448) | S side of Highway 274 between Spellman Rd and AR 203; 33°37′39″N 92°43′00″W | East Camden | |
| 10 | Shumaker Naval Ammunition Depot (NAD) Administration Building | | May 21, 2018 (#100002449) | 6415 Spellman Rd; 33°37′56″N 92°43′04″W | East Camden | |

== Former listings ==
| | Name on the Register | Image | Date listed | Date removed | Location | City or town | Description |
|---|---|---|---|---|---|---|---|
| 1 | State Highway 274 Bridge | | May 18, 1995 (#95000610) | January 16, 2026 | Highway 274 over Little Cypress Creek; 33°37′48″N 92°42′32″W | Thornton | |
| 2 | Tinsman School | Tinsman School | January 24, 2007 (#06001265) | September 18, 2013 | Southwestern corner of the junction of Highway 274 and County Road 38; 33°37′54″N 92°21′24″W | Tinsman | |

== See also ==
- List of National Historic Landmarks in Arkansas
- National Register of Historic Places listings in Arkansas
