= State Highway 274 Bridge =

- Formerly listed on the U.S. National Register of Historic Places
- Location within Arkansas Location within the United States
- Nearest city: Thornton, Arkansas
- Coordinates: 33°37′48″N 92°42′32″W
- Area: less than one acre
- Built: 1940
- MPS: Historic Bridges of Arkansas MPS
- NRHP reference No.: 95000610

Significant dates
- Added to NRHP: May 18, 1995
- Removed from NRHP: January 16, 2026

The bridge that carries Arkansas Highway 274 across Little Cypress Creek (about 0.25 miles (0.40 km) from its junction with Highway 203), near Thornton, Arkansas in Calhoun County, was listed on the National Register of Historic Places in 1995. The wooden trestle bridge was built in 1940, and is 105 feet (32 m) long and has a total width of 31 feet (9.4 m), with a deck 28.4 feet (8.7 m) wide. It is divided into seven spans, the longest of which is 15 feet (4.6 m). Its abutments and piers are all of wood, and the bridge deck is wood covered with asphalt. The National Park Service removed the State Highway 274 Bridge from the National Register of Historic Places on January 16, 2026.

== See also ==
- Little Cypress Creek Bridge: another bridge over the Little Cypress Creek
- National Register of Historic Places listings in Calhoun County, Arkansas
- List of bridges on the National Register of Historic Places in Arkansas
