= Dunn House =

Dunn House may refer to:

in the United States

(by state)

- Dunn House (Hampton, Arkansas), listed on the NRHP in Arkansas
- Globe Hotel (McDonough, Georgia), also known as Dunn House, listed on the NRHP in Georgia
- Dunn-Watkins House, Lancaster, KY, listed on the NRHP in Kentucky
- Peter Dunn House, McAfee, KY, listed on the NRHP in Kentucky
- Nathaniel Dunn House, Nicolasville, KY, listed on the NRHP in Kentucky
- Dunn House (Greenwood, Louisiana), listed on the NRHP in Louisiana
- Robert C. Dunn House, Princeton, MN, listed on the NRHP in Minnesota
- Andrew C. Dunn House, Winnebago, MN, listed on the NRHP in Minnesota
- Zaccheus Dunn House, Woodstown, NJ, listed on the NRHP in New Jersey
- Purefoy-Dunn Plantation, Wake Forest, NC, listed on the NRHP in North Carolina
- Shedd-Dunn House, Columbus, OH, listed on the NRHP in Ohio
- Patrick Dunn Ranch, Ashland, OR, listed on the NRHP in Oregon
- Dunn Ranch, Novillo Line Camp, Corpus Christi, TX, listed on the NRHP in Texas
- Frederick and Della Dunn House, Springville, UT, listed on the NRHP in Utah
