= Bearden Elementary School =

Bearden Elementary School may refer to:

- R. H. Bearden Elementary School - Tallahatchie County, Mississippi - West Tallahatchie School District
- Bearden Elementary School - Bearden, Arkansas - Bearden School District
- Bearden Public School - Okemah, Oklahoma
