= Bearden School District =

Bearden School District may refer to:

- Bearden School District (Arkansas)
- Bearden School District (Oklahoma)
