= 2000 United States presidential election in Arkansas =

- November 7, 2000

Nominee	George W. Bush	Al Gore
Party	Republican	Democratic
Home state	Texas	Tennessee
Running mate	Dick Cheney	Joe Lieberman
Electoral vote	6	0
Popular vote	472,940	422,768
Percentage	51.31%	45.86%

Bush
40–50%
50–60%
60–70%
Gore
40–50%
50–60%
60–70%
President before election
Bill Clinton
Democratic
Elected President
George W. Bush
Republican

The 2000 United States presidential election in Arkansas took place on November 7, 2000, and was part of the 2000 United States presidential election. State voters chose six representatives, or electors, to the Electoral College, who voted for president and vice president.

In this election, Arkansas was seen as a swing state, as George W. Bush's opposition to abortion and support for the death penalty, issues that resonated with many Arkansans, combined with Gore distancing himself from Arkansas native and sitting president Bill Clinton, created a battleground environment in the state.

In the end, Bush won the state by 5.45%; this represents a hard swing to the right from the 16.94-point Democratic victory four years prior. As of the 2024 presidential election, this is the last election in which Ashley County, Craighead County, Cross County, Dallas County, Drew County, Greene County, Hot Spring County, Izard County, Lafayette County, Nevada County, and Ouachita County have voted for the Democratic candidate. This is the last time the Democratic nominee for president won any congressional district in the state.

== General election ==
=== Polling ===
Poll source	Date(s)	Sample size	Margin of error	George W. Bush (R)	Al Gore (D)	Ralph Nader (G)	Other / undecided (Note: Calculated by taking the difference of 100% and all other listed candidates combined. For polls that do not report a figure for Nader, this includes his support.)
Rasmussen Reports	November 2, 2000	1,549	—	47%	45%	—	8%
Ethridge & Associates LLC	October 31, 2000	286	—	47%	44%	—	9%
Opinion Research Associates	October 29, 2000	700 (RV)	—	46%	46%	3%	5%
Mason-Dixon Polling & Strategy	October 28, 2000	625	—	45%	44%	4%	7%

=== Results ===
2000 United States presidential election in Arkansas
Party	Candidate	Running mate	Popular vote		Electoral vote		Swing
Party	Candidate	Running mate	Count	%	Count	%	Swing
Republican	George W. Bush of Texas	Dick Cheney of Wyoming	472,960	51.31%	6	100.00%	▲14.51%
Democratic	Al Gore of Tennessee	Joe Lieberman of Connecticut	422,768	45.86%	0	0.00%	▼7.88%
Green	Ralph Nader of Connecticut	Winona LaDuke of Minnesota	13,421	1.46%	0	0.00%	▲1.05%
Reform	Pat Buchanan of Virginia	Ezola B. Foster of California	5,192	0.80%	0	0.00%	▼7.10%
Libertarian	Harry Browne of Tennessee	Art Olivier of California	2,781	0.30%	0	0.00%	▼0.05%
Constitution	Howard Phillips of Virginia	Darrell Castle of Tennessee	23	0.00%	0	0.00%	Steady
Natural Law	John Hagelin of Iowa	Nat Goldhaber of California	367	0.06%	0	0.00%	▲0.06%
Write-in	Various of Various	Various of Various	1	0.00%	0	0.00%	Steady
Total			917,513	100.00%	6	100.00%	

==== By county ====
County	George W. Bush Republican		Al Gore Democratic		Various candidates Other parties		Margin		Total
County	#	%	#	%	#	%	#	%	Total
Arkansas	3,353	52.62%	2,877	45.15%	142	2.23%	476	7.47%	6,372
Ashley	3,876	46.86%	4,253	51.42%	142	1.72%	-377	-4.56%	8,271
Baxter	9,538	57.09%	6,516	39.00%	654	3.91%	3,022	18.09%	16,708
Benton	34,838	64.94%	17,277	32.21%	1,531	2.85%	17,561	32.73%	53,646
Boone	8,569	62.85%	4,493	32.95%	573	4.20%	4,076	29.90%	13,635
Bradley	1,793	45.06%	2,122	53.33%	64	1.61%	-329	-8.27%	3,979
Calhoun	1,128	51.62%	1,017	46.54%	40	1.83%	111	5.08%	2,185
Carroll	5,556	57.94%	3,595	37.49%	439	4.58%	1,961	20.45%	9,590
Chicot	1,564	35.13%	2,820	63.34%	68	1.53%	-1,256	-28.21%	4,452
Clark	3,376	43.77%	4,661	54.03%	189	2.19%	-1,285	-10.26%	8,626
Clay	2,254	38.20%	3,527	59.78%	119	2.02%	-1,273	-21.58%	5,900
Cleburne	5,730	56.14%	4,120	40.36%	357	3.50%	1,610	15.78%	10,207
Cleveland	1,678	52.75%	1,414	44.45%	89	2.80%	264	8.30%	3,181
Columbia	5,018	53.92%	4,003	43.01%	286	3.07%	1,015	10.91%	9,307
Conway	3,545	49.00%	3,496	48.33%	193	2.67%	49	0.67%	7,234
Craighead	12,158	48.33%	12,376	49.20%	623	2.48%	-218	-0.87%	25,157
Crawford	10,804	61.30%	6,288	35.68%	533	3.02%	4,516	25.62%	17,625
Crittenden	5,857	44.26%	7,224	54.59%	153	1.15%	-1,367	-10.33%	13,234
Cross	3,033	48.80%	3,096	49.81%	86	1.38%	-63	-1.01%	6,215
Dallas	1,571	47.25%	1,710	51.43%	44	1.32%	-139	-4.18%	3,325
Desha	1,603	35.66%	2,776	61.76%	116	2.58%	-1,173	-26.10%	4,495
Drew	2,756	46.54%	3,060	51.67%	106	1.79%	-304	-5.13%	5,922
Faulkner	16,055	54.95%	11,950	40.90%	1,211	4.14%	4,105	14.05%	29,216
Franklin	3,277	53.37%	2,674	43.55%	189	3.08%	603	9.82%	6,140
Fulton	2,036	49.56%	1,976	48.10%	96	2.34%	60	1.46%	4,108
Garland	19,098	53.15%	15,840	44.08%	997	2.77%	3,258	9.07%	35,935
Grant	3,285	54.63%	2,535	42.16%	193	3.21%	750	12.47%	6,013
Greene	5,831	46.71%	6,319	50.62%	334	2.68%	-488	-3.91%	12,484
Hempstead	3,257	44.68%	3,937	54.01%	95	1.30%	-680	-9.33%	7,289
Hot Spring	5,042	45.92%	5,527	50.33%	412	3.75%	-485	-4.41%	10,981
Howard	2,326	52.16%	2,063	46.27%	70	1.57%	263	5.89%	4,459
Independence	6,145	53.00%	5,146	44.39%	303	2.61%	999	8.61%	11,594
Izard	2,301	45.73%	2,587	51.41%	144	2.86%	-286	-5.68%	5,032
Jackson	2,280	37.55%	3,651	60.13%	141	2.32%	-1,371	-22.58%	6,072
Jefferson	8,765	32.22%	17,716	65.13%	720	2.65%	-8,951	-32.91%	27,201
Johnson	3,657	51.07%	3,270	45.66%	234	3.27%	387	5.41%	7,161
Lafayette	1,538	45.46%	1,806	53.38%	39	1.15%	-268	-7.92%	3,383
Lawrence	2,626	43.48%	3,255	53.89%	159	2.63%	-629	-10.41%	6,040
Lee	1,351	32.78%	2,727	66.17%	43	1.04%	-1,376	-33.39%	4,121
Lincoln	1,526	43.03%	1,957	55.19%	63	1.78%	-431	-12.16%	3,546
Little River	2,283	43.38%	2,883	54.78%	97	1.84%	-600	-11.40%	5,263
Logan	4,487	55.42%	3,283	40.55%	326	4.03%	1,204	14.87%	8,096
Lonoke	10,606	59.11%	6,851	38.18%	486	2.71%	3,755	20.93%	17,943
Madison	3,387	60.18%	2,055	36.51%	186	3.30%	1,332	23.67%	5,628
Marion	3,402	56.56%	2,233	37.12%	380	6.32%	1,169	19.44%	6,015
Miller	7,276	52.94%	6,278	45.67%	191	1.39%	998	7.27%	13,745
Mississippi	5,199	41.31%	7,107	56.47%	280	2.22%	-1,908	-15.16%	12,586
Monroe	1,329	40.36%	1,910	58.00%	54	1.64%	-581	-17.64%	3,293
Montgomery	2,128	56.91%	1,438	38.46%	173	4.63%	690	18.45%	3,739
Nevada	1,796	48.05%	1,867	49.95%	75	2.00%	-71	-1.90%	3,738
Newton	2,529	64.40%	1,205	30.69%	193	4.91%	1,324	33.71%	3,927
Ouachita	4,739	45.59%	5,464	52.56%	192	1.85%	-725	-6.97%	10,395
Perry	2,114	52.76%	1,648	41.13%	245	6.11%	466	11.63%	4,007
Phillips	3,154	33.87%	6,018	64.62%	141	1.51%	-2,864	-30.75%	9,313
Pike	2,275	57.29%	1,604	40.39%	92	2.32%	671	16.90%	3,971
Poinsett	2,988	41.30%	4,102	56.70%	145	2.00%	-1,114	-15.40%	7,235
Polk	4,600	63.95%	2,315	32.18%	278	3.86%	2,285	31.77%	7,193
Pope	11,244	61.04%	6,669	36.20%	509	2.76%	4,575	24.84%	18,422
Prairie	1,862	53.09%	1,563	44.57%	82	2.34%	299	8.52%	3,507
Pulaski	55,866	43.94%	68,320	53.73%	2,965	2.33%	-12,454	-9.79%	127,151
Randolph	2,673	45.48%	3,019	51.37%	185	3.15%	-346	-5.89%	5,877
St. Francis	3,414	40.18%	4,986	58.69%	96	1.13%	-1,572	-18.51%	8,496
Saline	18,617	57.48%	12,700	39.21%	1,074	3.32%	5,917	18.27%	32,391
Scott	2,399	60.26%	1,444	36.27%	138	3.47%	955	23.99%	3,981
Searcy	2,610	64.32%	1,229	30.29%	219	5.40%	1,381	34.03%	4,058
Sebastian	23,483	58.48%	15,555	38.73%	1,121	2.79%	7,928	19.75%	40,159
Sevier	2,111	49.17%	2,095	48.80%	87	2.03%	16	0.37%	4,293
Sharp	3,698	51.89%	3,236	45.41%	192	2.70%	462	6.48%	7,126
Stone	2,623	53.97%	2,043	42.04%	194	3.99%	580	11.93%	4,860
Union	8,647	55.40%	6,261	40.11%	701	4.49%	2,386	15.29%	15,609
Van Buren	3,485	49.90%	3,202	45.85%	297	4.25%	283	4.05%	6,984
Washington	28,231	54.86%	21,425	41.64%	1,803	3.50%	6,806	13.22%	51,459
White	13,170	59.46%	8,342	37.66%	638	2.88%	4,828	21.80%	22,150
Woodruff	898	33.87%	1,699	64.09%	54	2.04%	-801	-30.22%	2,651
Yell	3,223	49.75%	3,062	47.26%	194	2.99%	161	2.49%	6,479
Totals	472,940	51.31%	422,768	45.86%	26,073	2.83%	50,172	5.45%	921,781

==== Counties that flipped from Democratic to Republican ====
- Arkansas (largest city: Stuttgart)
- Calhoun (largest city: Hampton)
- Cleburne (largest city: Heber Springs)
- Cleveland (largest city: Rison)
- Columbia (largest city: Magnolia)
- Conway (largest city: Morrilton)
- Faulkner (largest city: Conway)
- Franklin (largest city: Ozark)
- Fulton (largest city: Salem)
- Garland (largest city: Hot Springs)
- Grant (largest city: Sheridan)
- Howard (largest city: Nashville)
- Independence (largest city: Batesville)
- Johnson (largest city: Clarksville)
- Logan (largest city: Booneville)
- Lonoke (largest city: Cabot)
- Madison (largest city: Huntsville)
- Marion (largest city: Bull Shoals)
- Miller (largest city: Texarkana)
- Montgomery (largest city: Mount Ida)
- Perry (largest city: Perryville)
- Pike (largest city: Glenwood)
- Pope (largest city: Russellville)
- Prairie (largest city: Des Arc)
- Saline (largest city: Benton)
- Scott (largest city: Waldron)
- Sevier (largest city: De Queen)
- Sharp (largest city: Cherokee Village)
- Stone (largest city: Mountain View)
- Union (largest city: El Dorado)
- Van Buren (largest city: Clinton)
- Washington (largest city: Fayetteville)
- White (largest city: Searcy)
- Yell (largest city: Dardanelle)

==== By congressional district ====
Bush won two of four congressional districts, including one that elected a Democrat.

District	Gore	Bush	Representative
1st	50%	47%	Marion Berry
2nd	48%	49%	Vic Snyder
3rd	37%	59%	Asa Hutchinson
3rd	37%	59%	John Boozman
4th	50%	47%	Jay Dickey
4th	50%	47%	Mike Ross

== Electors ==
Technically the voters of Arkansas cast their ballots for electors: representatives to the Electoral College. Arkansas is allocated six electors because it has four congressional districts and two senators. All candidates who appear on the ballot or qualify to receive write-in votes must submit a list of six electors, who pledge to vote for their candidate and their running mate. Whoever wins the majority of votes in the state is awarded all six electoral votes. Their chosen electors then vote for president and vice president. Although electors are pledged to their candidate and running mate, they are not obligated to vote for them. An elector who votes for someone other than their candidate is known as a faithless elector.

The electors of each state and the District of Columbia met on December 18, 2000 to cast their votes for president and vice president. The Electoral College itself never meets as one body. Instead, the electors from each state and the District of Columbia met in their respective capitols.

The following were the members of the Electoral College from the state. All were pledged to and voted for George W. Bush and Dick Cheney:

1. Pat Dodge
2. Bud Cummins
3. Mildred Homan
4. Betsy Thompson
5. Kim Hendren
6. Sarah Agee

== See also ==
- United States presidential elections in Arkansas
- Presidency of George W. Bush
