= Keller Site (Calion, Arkansas) =

Archaeological site in Arkansas, United States

- U.S. National Register of Historic Places
- Nearest city: Calion, Arkansas
- Area: 15 acres (6.1 ha)
- NRHP reference No.: 79000434
- Added to NRHP: October 29, 1979

The Keller Site is a prehistoric ceremonial center located on a former plantation property in Calhoun County, Arkansas. It consists of a group of burial mounds that were apparently first established by the Coles Creek culture (c. 500-600 CE), and the area also saw use in the Caddoan period, c. 1200 CE. The site was partially excavated in 1909 by Clarence Bloomfield Moore. The site, which was listed on the National Register of Historic Places in 1979, is primarily notable because it is relatively undisturbed, providing the potential for further fruitful research.

== See also ==
- National Register of Historic Places listings in Calhoun County, Arkansas
