= List of lakes of Calhoun County, Arkansas =

There are at least 40 named lakes and reservoirs in Calhoun County, Arkansas.

== Lakes ==
- Big Johnson Lake, 33°30′14″N 092°42′29″W, el. 92 feet (28 m)
- Cobeen Brake, 33°21′20″N 092°31′15″W, el. 79 feet (24 m)
- Cross Current Brake, 33°21′29″N 092°31′35″W, el. 75 feet (23 m)
- Ditch Lake, 33°21′58″N 092°33′15″W, el. 79 feet (24 m)
- Grapevine Lake, 33°17′05″N 092°25′46″W, el. 79 feet (24 m)
- Mud Lake, 33°20′43″N 092°31′24″W, el. 79 feet (24 m)
- Signboard Brake, 33°20′08″N 092°30′42″W, el. 75 feet (23 m)
- Tupelo Gum Brake, 33°22′10″N 092°33′24″W, el. 79 feet (24 m)
- Big Horseshoe Brake, 33°25′22″N 092°33′30″W, el. 79 feet (24 m)
- Black Lake, 33°26′25″N 092°33′10″W, el. 79 feet (24 m)
- Black Lake Slough, 33°25′50″N 092°33′26″W, el. 82 feet (25 m)
- Blackwater Lakes, 33°27′37″N 092°40′07″W, el. 89 feet (27 m)
- Cages Lake, 33°25′05″N 092°37′37″W, el. 79 feet (24 m)
- Cooks Lake, 33°25′37″N 092°32′55″W, el. 79 feet (24 m)
- Crane Lake, 33°23′12″N 092°34′36″W, el. 79 feet (24 m)
- Duck Roost Lake, 33°22′39″N 092°34′27″W, el. 79 feet (24 m)
- Hades Lake, 33°23′34″N 092°34′49″W, el. 82 feet (25 m)
- Half Moon Lake, 33°27′36″N 092°40′40″W, el. 85 feet (26 m)
- Hollingsworth Brake, 33°23′52″N 092°32′50″W, el. 79 feet (24 m)
- Little Bay Lake, 33°25′35″N 092°37′47″W, el. 85 feet (26 m)
- Little Horseshoe Brake, 33°22′45″N 092°32′52″W, el. 79 feet (24 m)
- Long Lake, 33°23′21″N 092°33′22″W, el. 79 feet (24 m)
- Moro Bay, 33°18′15″N 092°21′16″W, el. 79 feet (24 m)
- Scott Water, 33°41′51″N 092°19′41″W, el. 151 feet (46 m)
- Snow Lake, 33°23′17″N 092°34′16″W, el. 79 feet (24 m)
- Spoon Lake, 33°26′24″N 092°40′34″W, el. 79 feet (24 m)
- Tom Cook Brake, 33°26′48″N 092°33′14″W, el. 79 feet (24 m)
- Viney Brake, 33°23′22″N 092°33′11″W, el. 79 feet (24 m)
- Walker Lake, 33°33′29″N 092°43′35″W, el. 92 feet (28 m)

== Reservoirs ==
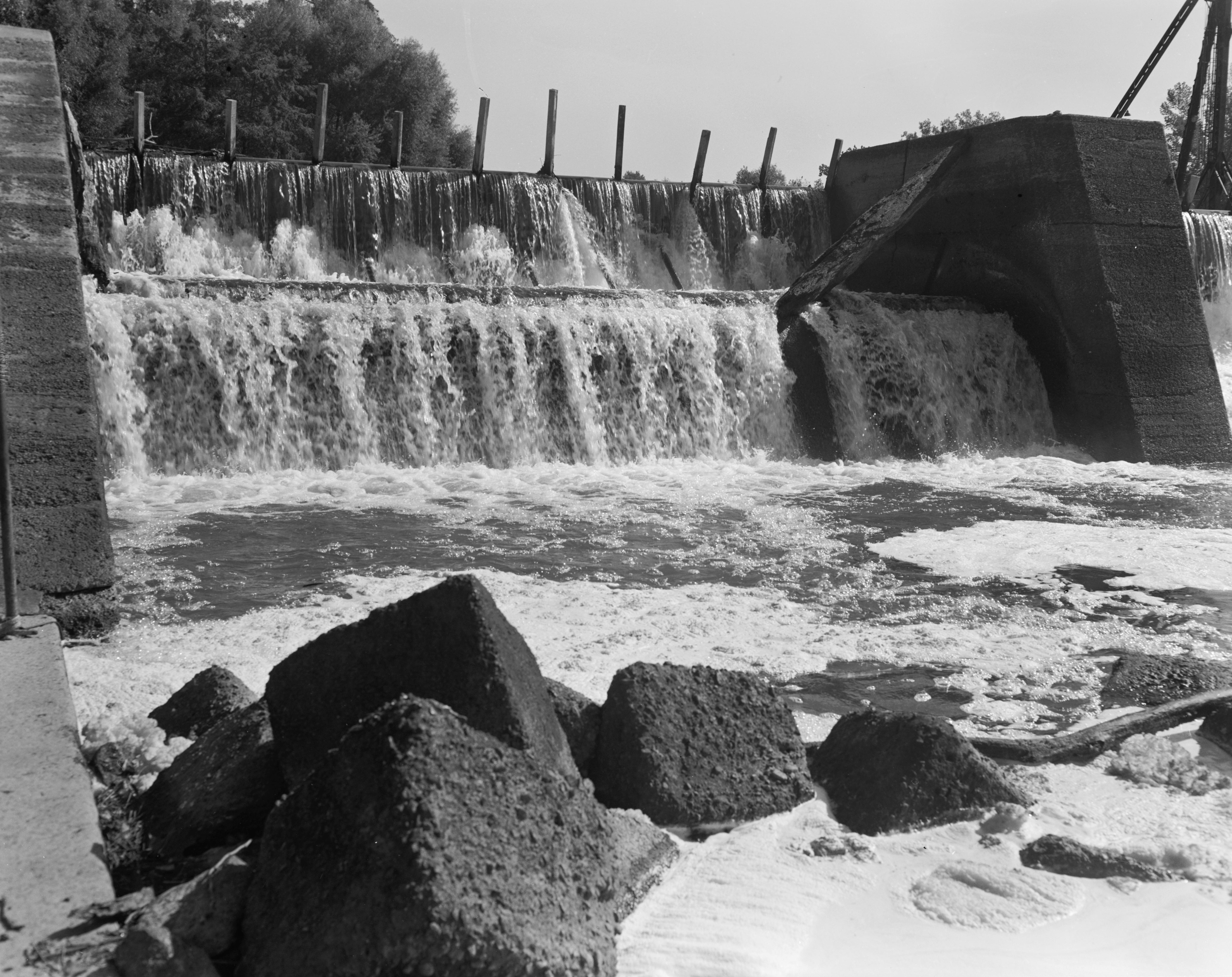
The Ouachita River Lock and Dam No. 8 impounds the Ouachita River and creates the Ouachita River Reservoir. It is also listed on the National Register of Historic Places.

- Artificial Lake, 33°20′37″N 092°30′50″W, el. 82 feet (25 m)
- Covington Pond, 33°41′28″N 092°36′42″W, el. 203 feet (62 m)
- Harrell Lake, 33°31′17″N 092°20′36″W, el. 194 feet (59 m)
- Lake Cathay, 33°46′04″N 092°29′43″W, el. 289 feet (88 m)
- Lake Lansdale, 33°47′5″N 092°27′57″W, el. 299 feet (91 m)
- Little Mud Lake, 33°20′21″N 092°31′29″W, el. 79 feet (24 m)
- Middle Pond, 33°40′09″N 092°32′23″W, el. 239 feet (73 m)
- North Pond, 33°40′37″N 092°33′08″W, el. 249 feet (76 m)
- Ouachita River Reservoir, 33°18′06″N 092°27′49″W, el. 79 feet (24 m)
- South Pond, 33°39′58″N 092°31′07″W, el. 243 feet (74 m)
- Tri-County Lake, 33°46′58″N 092°21′40″W, el. 197 feet (60 m)

== See also ==
- List of lakes in Arkansas
