= Boone's Mounds =

Archaeological site in Arkansas, United States

- U.S. National Register of Historic Places
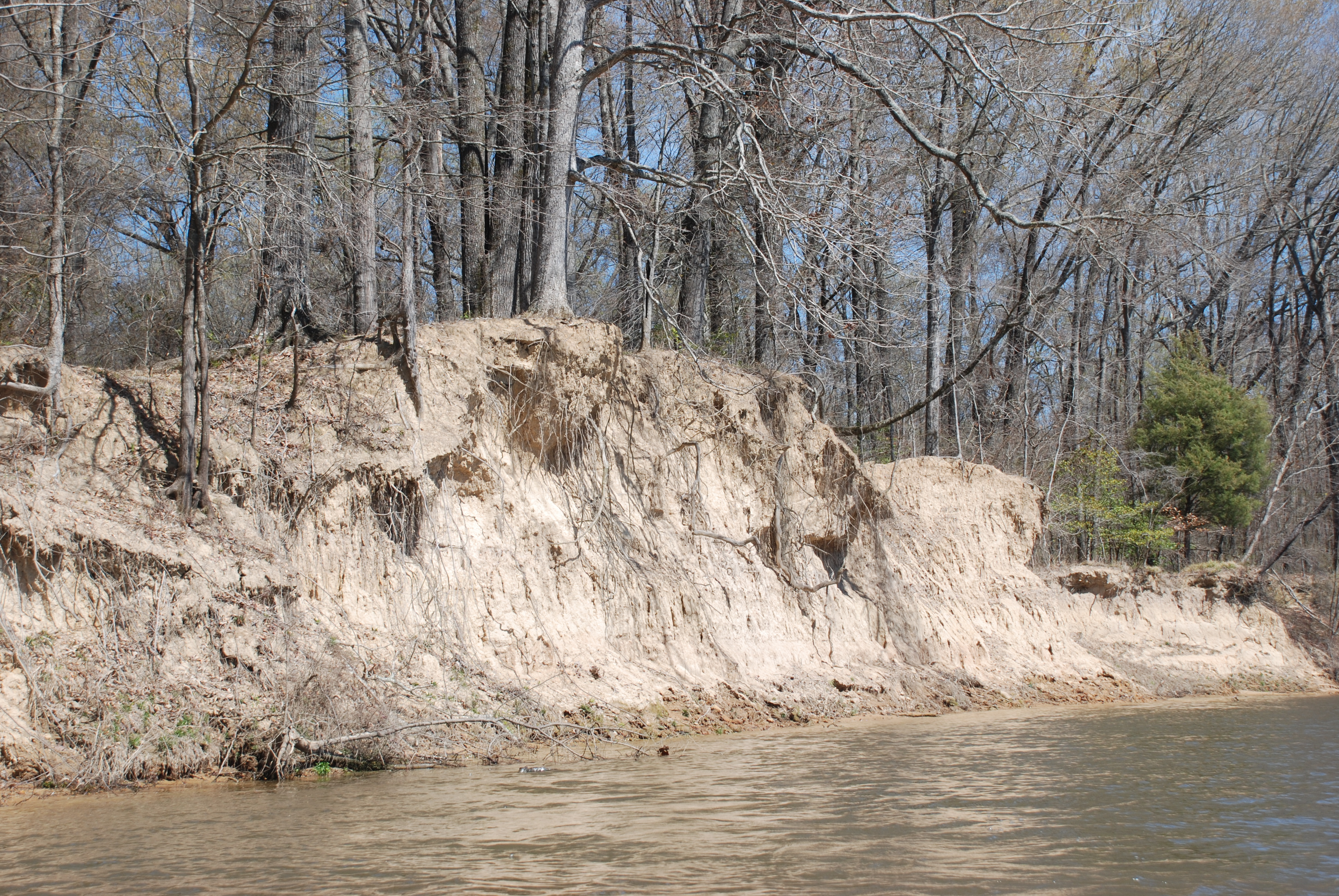
- Mound 1 eroding into the Ouachita River, March, 2013

- Location within Arkansas Location within the United States
- Nearest city: Calion, Arkansas
- Coordinates: 33.379584°N 92.5710145°W
- Area: 40 acres (16 ha)
- NRHP reference No.: 80000774
- Added to NRHP: April 14, 1980

Boone's Mounds are a ceremonial site of the Coles Creek culture located in Calhoun County, Arkansas. The site is one of the largest mound sites in the Ouachita River valley. Archeological excavation at the site has yielded dates of occupation as early as 600 AD, and it may still have been in use during the early contact period, c. 1700. The site was located on private property at the time of its listing on the National Register of Historic Places in 1980.

== See also ==
- National Register of Historic Places listings in Calhoun County, Arkansas
