= Bearden High School =

Bearden High School may refer to:

- Bearden High School (Arkansas) - Bearden, Arkansas
- Bearden High School (Tennessee) - Knoxville, Tennessee
