= Hampton Cemetery, Arkansas =

Historic cemetery in Arkansas, United States

- Hampton Cemetery
- U.S. National Register of Historic Places
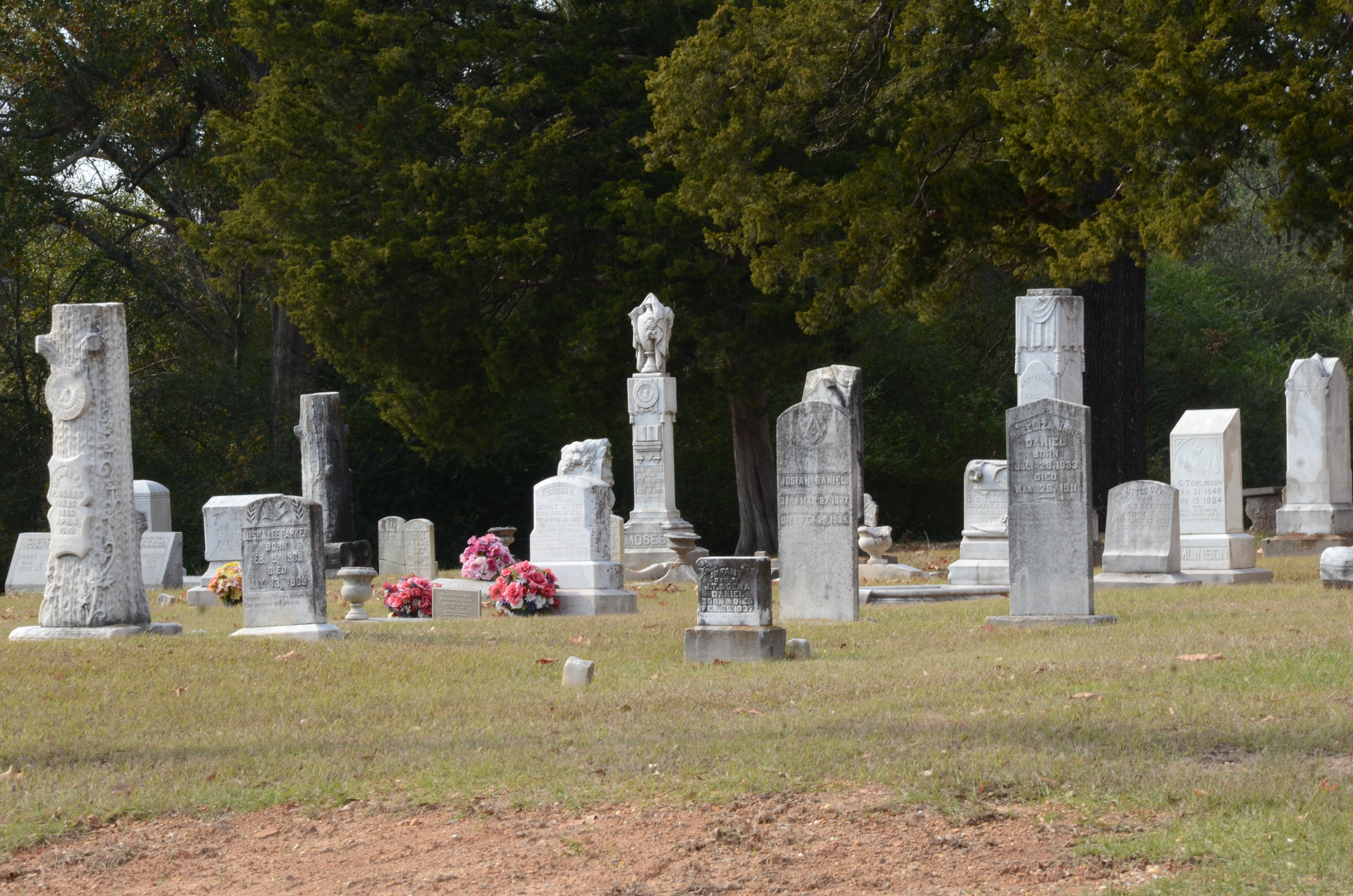

- Location within Arkansas Location within the United States
- Location: S. of the jct of US 278 W. and 1st St., Hampton, Arkansas
- Coordinates: 33°32′18″N 92°28′23″W
- Area: less than one acre
- Built: 1878
- NRHP reference No.: 09000340
- Added to NRHP: May 27, 2009

Hampton Cemetery is a historic cemetery in downtown Hampton, Arkansas. The 0.5-acre (0.20 ha) cemetery is located near the center of town, not far from the Calhoun County Courthouse, and immediately adjacent to the Hampton Church of Christ. The cemetery is said to have been used as a burying ground since the first days of settlement in the area (which began in 1848), although the first marked grave is dated 1878. The town decided in 1920 to stop allowing burials other than those already reserved, and the last burial took place in the cemetery in 1969. There are estimated to be 139 burials in the cemetery, although only 103 are marked. Most of the marked graves are dated between 1890 and 1920.

Land for the cemetery was deeded to the town by Nathaniel and Roxanna Hunt, the first settlers in the area, in 1848. There is no formal entrance to the cemetery, nor is it fenced in any way. The gravestones are all aligned to face east, and are only arranged in irregular lines; there is no formal landscaping. The gravestones have for the most part only deteriorated due to age, weather, and neglect; there has been little vandalism.

The family with the largest number of graves is the Tobin family, with fifteen. Daniel Tobin first surveyed the area in 1847, and the family plots appear to be tended. The largest monument, a stone representation of an obelisk draped in cloth, memorializes Effie Dunn. That family's plot includes at least three graves of children.

The cemetery was listed on the National Register of Historic Places in 2009.

== See also ==
- National Register of Historic Places listings in Calhoun County, Arkansas
