= Bearden, Arkansas =

- City
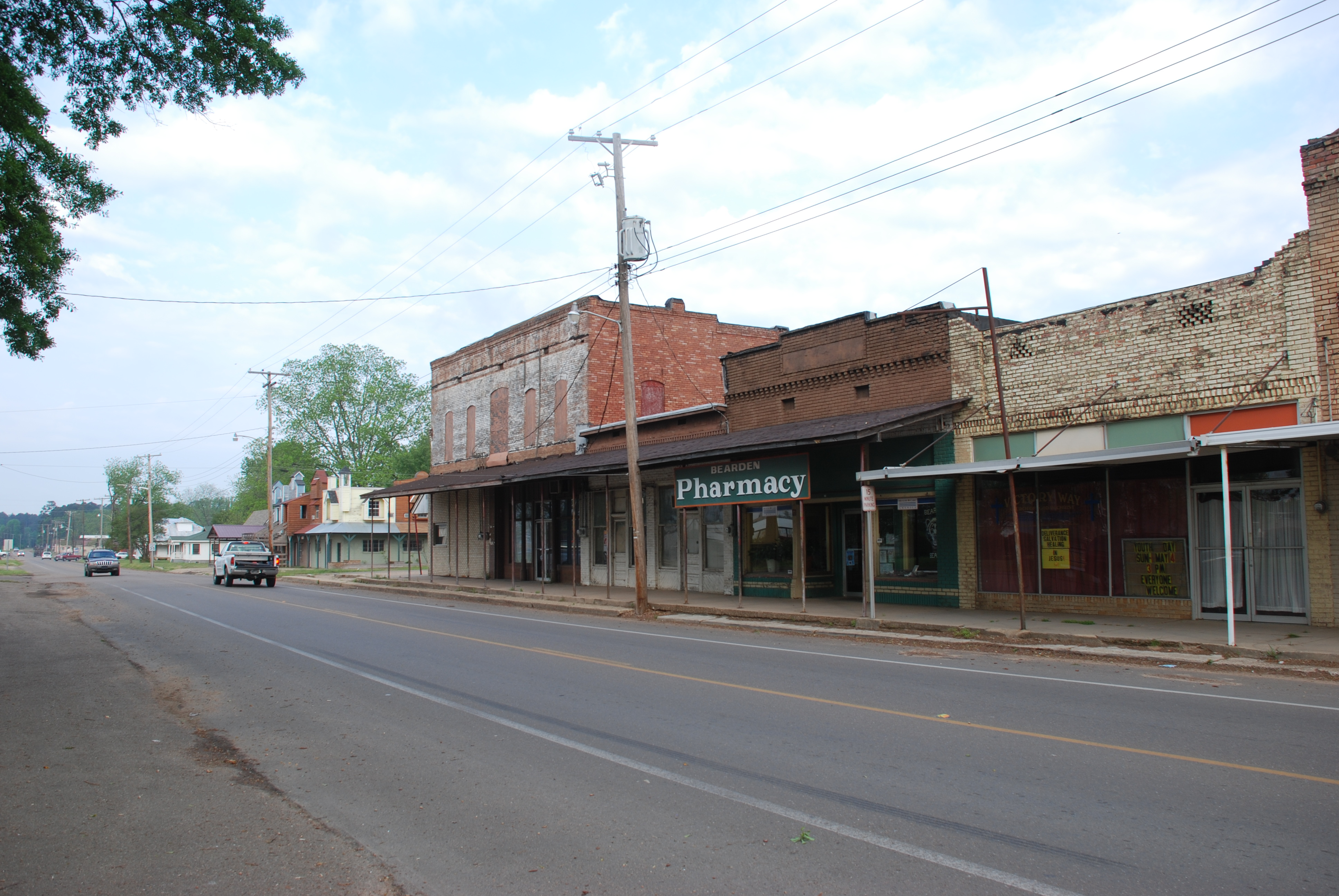

- Location of Bearden in Ouachita County, Arkansas.
- Coordinates: 33°43′34″N 92°37′23″W
- Country: United States
- State: Arkansas
- County: Ouachita

Area
  - Total: 1.61 sq mi (4.18 km^{2})
  - Land: 1.61 sq mi (4.18 km^{2})
  - Water: 0 sq mi (0.00 km^{2})
- Elevation: 236 ft (72 m)

Population (2020)
  - Total: 776
  - Estimate (2025): 738 ▼
  - Density: 480.9/sq mi (185.66/km^{2})
- Time zone: UTC−06:00 (Central (CST))
  - Summer (DST): UTC−06:00 (CDT)
- ZIP Code: 71720
- Area code: 870
- FIPS code: 05-04420
- GNIS feature ID: 2403830

Bearden is a city in northeastern Ouachita County, Arkansas, United States. The population was 776 at the 2020 census. It is part of the Camden Micropolitan Statistical Area.

== Geography ==
According to the United States Census Bureau, the city has a total area of 1.1 square miles (2.8 km^{2}), all land.

== Demographics ==
Historical population
| Census | Pop. | Note | %± |
|---|---|---|---|
| 1900 | 341 | | — |
| 1910 | 439 | | 28.7% |
| 1920 | 687 | | 56.5% |
| 1930 | 1,147 | | 67.0% |
| 1940 | 961 | | −16.2% |
| 1950 | 1,300 | | 35.3% |
| 1960 | 1,268 | | −2.5% |
| 1970 | 1,272 | | 0.3% |
| 1980 | 1,191 | | −6.4% |
| 1990 | 1,021 | | −14.3% |
| 2000 | 1,125 | | 10.2% |
| 2010 | 966 | | −14.1% |
| 2020 | 776 | | −19.7% |
| 2025 (est.) | 738 | ▼ | −4.9% |
U.S. Decennial Census

=== 2020 census ===
Bearden racial composition
| Race | Num. | Perc. |
|---|---|---|
| White (non-Hispanic) | 402 | 51.8% |
| Black or African American (non-Hispanic) | 290 | 37.37% |
| Native American | 1 | 0.13% |
| Asian | 5 | 0.64% |
| Pacific Islander | 1 | 0.13% |
| Other/Mixed | 49 | 6.31% |
| Hispanic or Latino | 28 | 3.61% |

As of the 2020 United States census, there were 776 people, 392 households, and 248 families residing in the city.

=== 2010 census ===
As of the 2010 United States census, there were 966 people living in the city. The racial makeup of the city was 58.7% White, 32.5% Black, 0.3% Native American, 0.2% Asian and 2.5% from two or more races. 5.8% were Hispanic or Latino of any race.

=== 2000 census ===
As of the census of 2000, there were 1,125 people, 443 households, and 295 families living in the city. The population density was 976.7 inhabitants per square mile (377.1/km^{2}). There were 495 housing units at an average density of 429.8 per square mile (165.9/km^{2}). The racial makeup of the city was 65.07% White, 32.44% Black or African American, 0.18% Native American, 0.09% Asian, 1.07% from other races, and 1.16% from two or more races. 1.51% of the population were Hispanic or Latino of any race.

There were 445 households, out of which 32.3% had children under the age of 18 living with them, 45.6% were married couples living together, 16.7% had a female householder with no husband present, and 33.4% were non-families. 31.4% of all households were made up of individuals, and 14.2% had someone living alone who was 65 years of age or older. The average household size was 2.51 and the average family size was 3.16.

In the city, the population was spread out, with 27.8% under the age of 18, 9.0% from 18 to 24, 26.0% from 25 to 44, 23.7% from 45 to 64, and 13.4% who were 65 years of age or older. The median age was 36 years. For every 100 females, there were 96.0 males. For every 100 females age 18 and over, there were 87.1 males.

The median income for a household in the city was $26,420, and the median income for a family was $30,573. Males had a median income of $28,611 versus $14,886 for females. The per capita income for the city was $12,904. About 18.3% of families and 21.7% of the population were below the poverty line, including 29.7% of those under age 18 and 19.2% of those age 65 or over.

== Education ==
Public education for elementary and secondary students is provided by the Bearden School District, which includes:

- Bearden Elementary School, serving kindergarten through grade 6.
- Bearden High School, serving grades 7 through 12.

== Notable people ==
- Marion H. Crank, politician, born in Bearden in 1915
- James H. Cone (1938–2018), Father of Black Liberation Theology, raised in Bearden, Arkansas.
