= Camden micropolitan area, Arkansas =

Camden Micropolitan Area
- Micropolitan Statistical Area
- Camden, AR Micropolitan Statistical Area
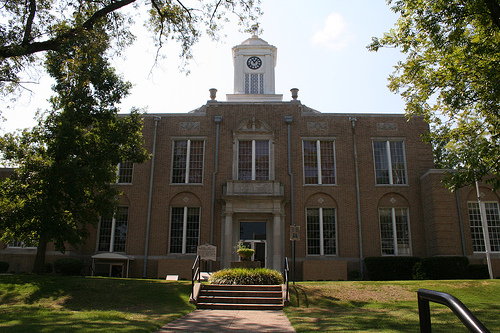
- Ouachita County Courthouse in Camden
Interactive Map of Camden, AR μSA
City of Camden
Camden, AR μSA
- Country: United States
- State: Arkansas
- Largest city: Camden
- Other city: Hampton
- Time zone: UTC−6 (CST)
  - Summer (DST): UTC−5 (CDT)

The Camden Micropolitan Statistical Area, as defined by the United States Census Bureau, is an area consisting of two counties in the U.S. state of Arkansas, anchored by the city of Camden.

As of the 2010 census, the MSA had a population of 31,489 (though a 2016 estimate placed the population at 29,242).

== Counties ==
- Calhoun
- Ouachita

== Communities ==
- Places with more than 10,000 inhabitants
  - Camden (Principal city)
- Places with 1,000 to 5,000 inhabitants
  - Bearden
  - Hampton
  - Stephens
- Places with 500 to 1,000 inhabitants
  - East Camden
  - Thornton
- Places with less than 500 inhabitants
  - Chidester
  - Harrell
  - Louann
  - Reader (partial)
  - Tinsman
- Unincorporated places
  - Cullendale

== Demographics ==
As of the census of 2000, there were 34,534 people, 13,930 households, and 9,699 families residing within the μSA. The racial makeup of the μSA was 62.20% White, 36.10% African American, 0.25% Native American, 0.21% Asian, 0.02% Pacific Islander, 0.37% from other races, and 0.85% from two or more races. Hispanic or Latino of any race were 0.86% of the population.

The median income for a household in the μSA was $28,890, and the median income for a family was $35,192. Males had a median income of $30,665 versus $18,126 for females. The per capita income for the μSA was $15,337.

== See also ==
- Arkansas census statistical areas
