= Hampton School District (Arkansas) =

School district in Arkansas, United States

Location
- 455 East Main Street; Hampton, Arkansas 71744 United States

District information
- Grades: PK–12
- Superintendent: Jimmy Cunningham
- Accreditation: Arkansas Department of Education
- Schools: 2
- NCES District ID: 0507230

Students and staff
- Students: 577
- Teachers: 44.54 (on FTE basis)
- Staff: 105.54 (on FTE basis)
- Student–teacher ratio: 12.95
- Athletic conference: 2A 8 (Football); 2A 7 West (Basketball)
- District mascot: Bulldogs
- Colors: Black; White; Gold

Other information
- Website: www.hamptonbulldogs.school

Hampton School District is a public school district based in Hampton, Arkansas, United States. The school district encompasses 479.67 square miles (1,242.3 km^{2}) of land including all of Hampton and portions of several Calhoun County communities including Camden, Harrell, and Tinsman.

The district proves comprehensive education for pre-kindergarten through grade 12 is accredited by the Arkansas Department of Education (ADE).

== History ==
In 1965 the Calhoun County School District merged into the Hampton School District.

== Schools ==
- Hampton High School, serving more than 250 students in grades 7 through 12.
- Hampton Elementary School, serving more than 250 students in pre-kindergarten and 6
