= Ouachita River Lock and Dam No. 8 =

- U.S. National Register of Historic Places
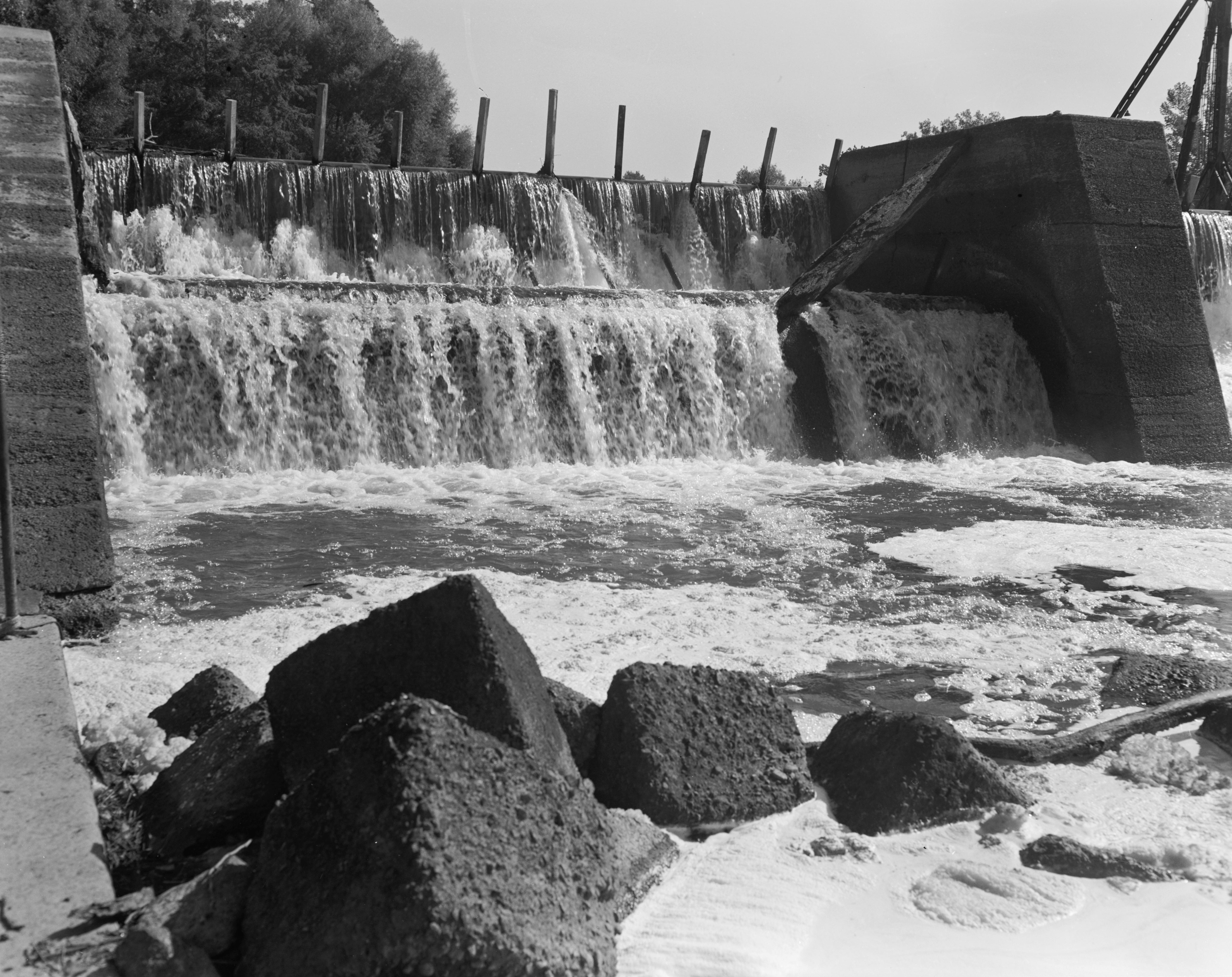

- Location within Arkansas Location within the United States
- Nearest city: Calion, Arkansas
- Coordinates: 33°17′59.8″N 92°27′53.2″W
- Area: 11.3 acres (4.6 ha)
- Built: 1907
- Architect: U.S. Army Corps of Engineers
- NRHP reference No.: 83003458
- Added to NRHP: December 19, 1983

The Ouachita River Lock and Dam No. 8 are a historic lock and dam on the Ouachita River in Calhoun County, Arkansas. The area is managed by the county and the Arkansas Fish and Game Commission as a public recreation area. The facility offers a boat ramp and a few campsites.

The lock and dam were listed on the National Register of Historic Places in 1983.

== See also ==
- National Register of Historic Places listings in Calhoun County, Arkansas
