= Little Cypress Creek Bridge =

- Formerly listed on the U.S. National Register of Historic Places
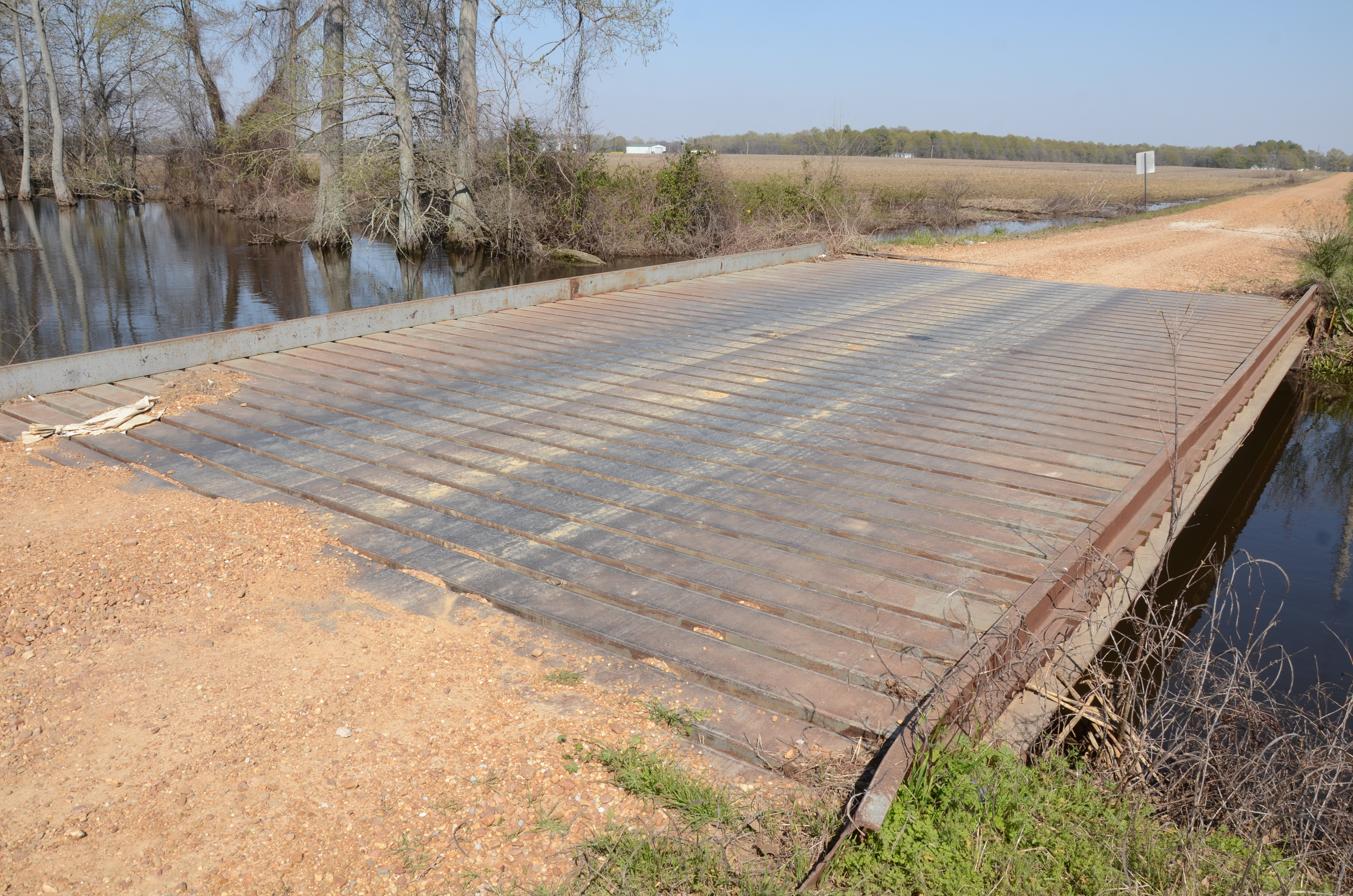

- Location within Arkansas Location within the United States
- Nearest city: Postelle, Arkansas
- Coordinates: 34°33′27″N 91°1′24″W
- Area: less than one acre
- Built: 1942
- MPS: Historic Bridges of Arkansas MPS
- NRHP reference No.: 95000611

Significant dates
- Added to NRHP: May 18, 1995
- Removed from NRHP: January 16, 2026

The Little Cypress Creek Bridge is a historic bridge in rural western Phillips County, Arkansas. Located south of the hamlet of Postelle, it carries County Road 600 over Little Cypress Creek, west of Arkansas Highway 39. It consists of two 15-foot (4.6 m) spans of an aluminum-beam substructure, resting on concrete abutments and piers, with textured metal deck plating as the road surface. The bridge was built in 1942, and was probably designed by the engineering staff of the Arkansas State Highway Commission. It is a well-preserved example of a World War II-era bridge.

The bridge was listed on the National Register of Historic Places in 1995.

== See also ==
- State Highway 274 Bridge: another bridge over the Little Cypress Creek
- National Register of Historic Places listings in Phillips County, Arkansas
- List of bridges on the National Register of Historic Places in Arkansas
