= Hampton Masonic Lodge Building =

- U.S. National Register of Historic Places
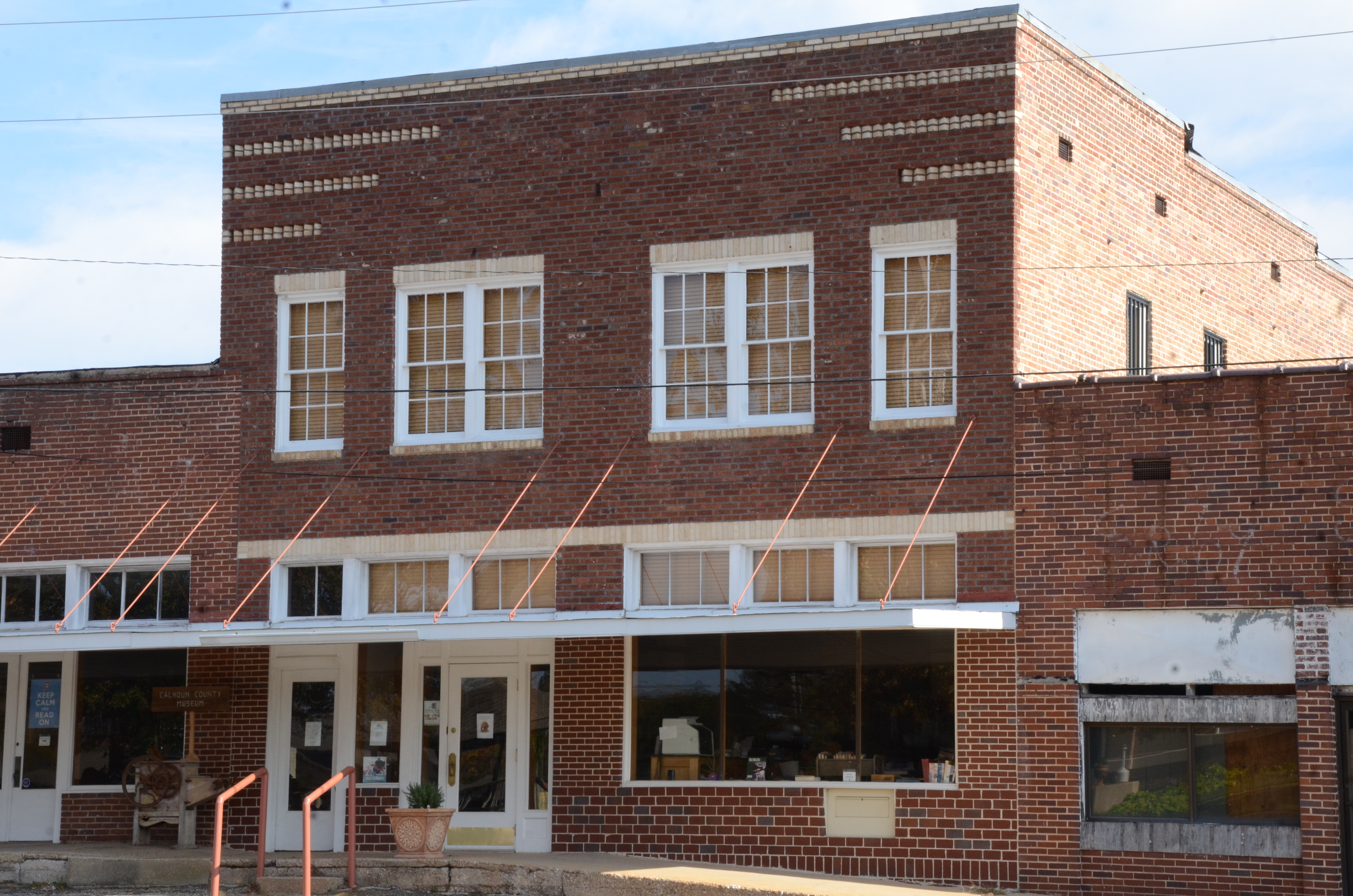

- Location within Arkansas Location within the United States
- Location: 115 S. 2nd St., Hampton, Arkansas
- Coordinates: 33.537595°N 92.471544°W
- Area: 0.9 acres (0.36 ha)
- Built: 1920
- Architectural style: Early Commercial
- NRHP reference No.: 08000433
- Added to NRHP: May 20, 2008

The Hampton Masonic Lodge Building in Hampton, Arkansas is an Early Commercial style building that was built in 1920. As originally designed the building had commercial store space on the first floor, and rooms for both the Hampton Masonic Lodge and the Farmers Home Administration on the second floor. In 1954, the building was acquired by the Western Auto Store, and the second floor was turned into a toy department. It was listed on the National Register of Historic Places in 2008.
