= Hampton High School (Arkansas) =

Location
- 419 East Main Street; Hampton, Arkansas 71744; United States; 33°32′14″N 92°27′50″W

Information
- Status: Open
- School district: Hampton School District
- NCES District ID: 0507230
- Authority: Arkansas Department of Education (ADE)
- CEEB code: 041000
- NCES School ID: 050723000441
- Principal: Bryan Sanders
- Faculty: 25.67 (on FTE basis)
- Grades: 7–12
- Enrollment: 256 (2023–2024)
- Student to teacher ratio: 9.97
- Education system: ADE Smart Core curriculum
- Classes offered: Regular/Core; Career Focus; Advanced Placement
- Campus type: Rural
- Colors: Black, white, and gold
- Athletics conference: (2012–14)
- Nickname: Dawgs
- Team name: Hampton Bulldogs
- Accreditation: ADE; AdvancED (1925–)
- Communities served: Hampton, Tinsman, Harrell, Camden
- Affiliation: Arkansas Activities Association
- Website: www.hamptonbulldogs.school/o/hhs

Hampton High School is an accredited, comprehensive, public high school serving students in grades 9 through 12 in Hampton, Arkansas, United States. Administered by the Hampton School District as the sole public high school in Calhoun County, Arkansas, the district encompasses 479.67 square miles (1,242.3 km^{2}) of land including Hampton and all or portions of Harrell, Tinsman, and Camden.

== Academics ==
The Hampton High School is accredited by the Arkansas Department of Education (ADE).

=== Curriculum ===
The assumed course of study follows the Smart Core curriculum developed the Arkansas Department of Education (ADE), which requires students to complete at least 22 credit units before graduation. Students engage in regular and career focus courses and exams and may select Advanced Placement (AP) coursework and exams that provide an opportunity to receive college credit. According to the student handbook, exceptional students may be awarded an Honors Graduates based on participation in 10 advanced courses, two credits in foreign language and a 3.5 grade point average (GPA).

== Athletics ==
The Hampton High School mascot is the Bulldog with school colors of black, white, and gold.

For the 2012–14 school years, the Hampton Bulldogs participate in the 2A Classification within the 2A Region 8 Conference (football) and 2A Region 7 West Conference (basketball) as administered by the Arkansas Activities Association. The Bulldogs compete in various interscholastic activities including football, basketball (boys/girls), baseball, fastpitch softball, tennis (boys/girls), and cheer.

== Notable alumni ==
- Charles B. Pierce—American film director, screenwriter, producer, set decorator, cinematographer and actor.
- Harry Thomason—American film and television director and producer.
