= Dunn House (Hampton, Arkansas) =

Historic house in Arkansas, United States

- U.S. National Register of Historic Places
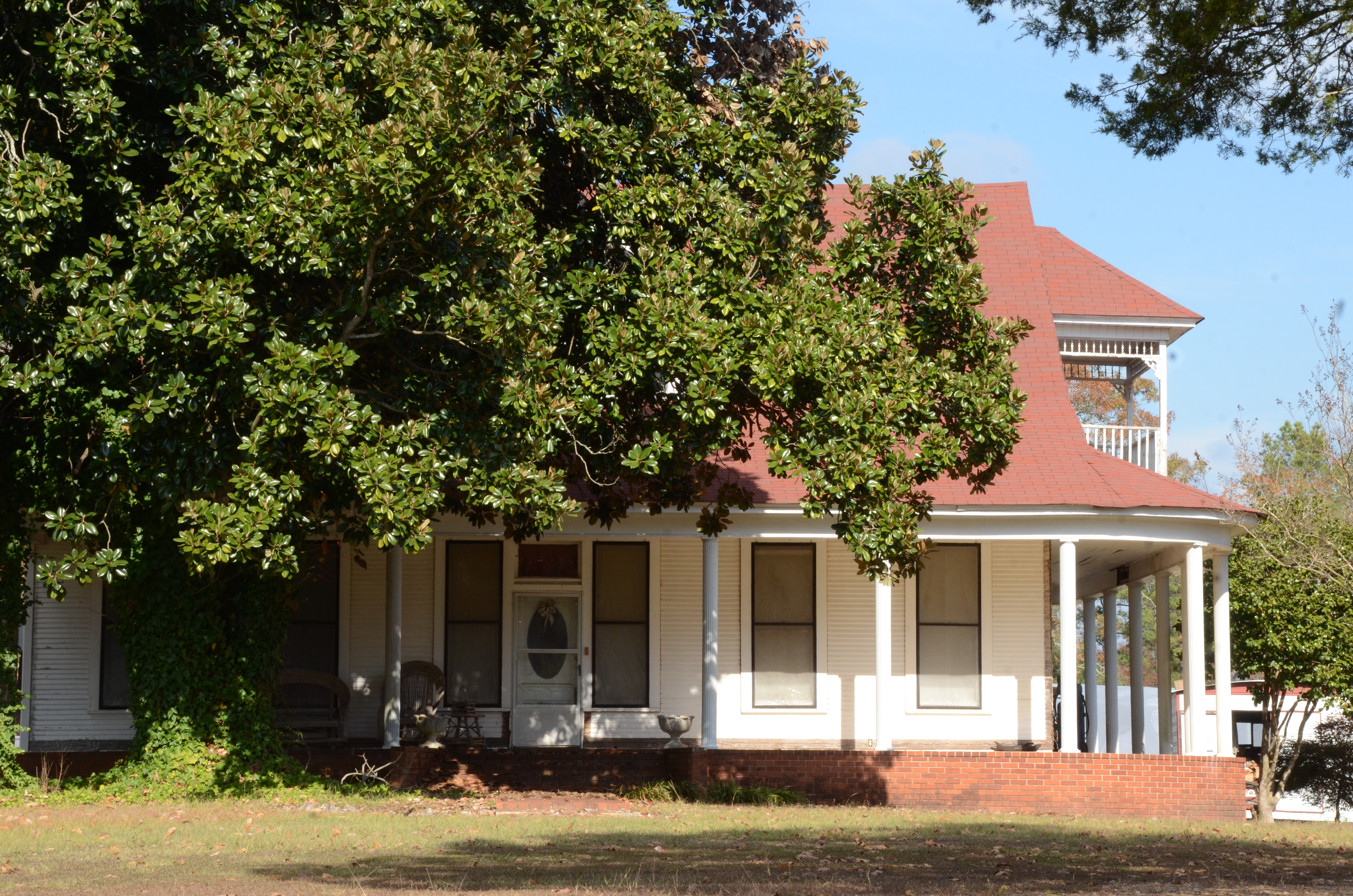

- Location within Arkansas Location within the United States
- Nearest city: Hampton, Arkansas
- Coordinates: 33°32′10″N 92°31′10″W
- Area: less than one acre
- Built: 1909
- Built by: Will Black
- NRHP reference No.: 76000391
- Added to NRHP: May 4, 1976

The Dunn House in Hampton, Arkansas is an early 20th vernacular farmhouse. The 1 1/2-story L-shaped wood-frame house was built in 1909 for the Dunn family, which continues to own the property. It features a center gable dormer on the front facade, which includes a small eyebrow window, and a porch extending the width of the front supported by 18 Doric columns.

The house was listed on the National Register of Historic Places in 1976.

== See also ==
- National Register of Historic Places listings in Calhoun County, Arkansas
