= Bearden School District (Arkansas) =

School district in Arkansas, United States

Address
- 100 Oak Avenue Bearden, Arkansas, 71720; United States

District information
- Type: Public
- Grades: K–12
- NCES District ID: 0500032

Students and staff
- Students: 488
- Teachers: 46.38
- Staff: 43.57
- Student–teacher ratio: 10.52

Other information
- Website: www.beardenschools.org

Bearden School District 53 is a public school district based in Bearden, Arkansas, United States.

The school district encompasses 251.30 square miles (650.9 km^{2}) of land in Ouachita, Dallas, and Calhoun counties.

Within Ouachita County it includes Bearden. Within Calhoun County it serves Thornton.

== History ==
On July 1, 1985, the Thornton School District consolidated into the Bearden district.

== Schools ==
- Bearden Elementary School, serving kindergarten through grade 6.
- Bearden High School, serving grades 7 through 12.
