= Frederick and Della Dunn House =

Historic house in Utah, United States

- U.S. National Register of Historic Places
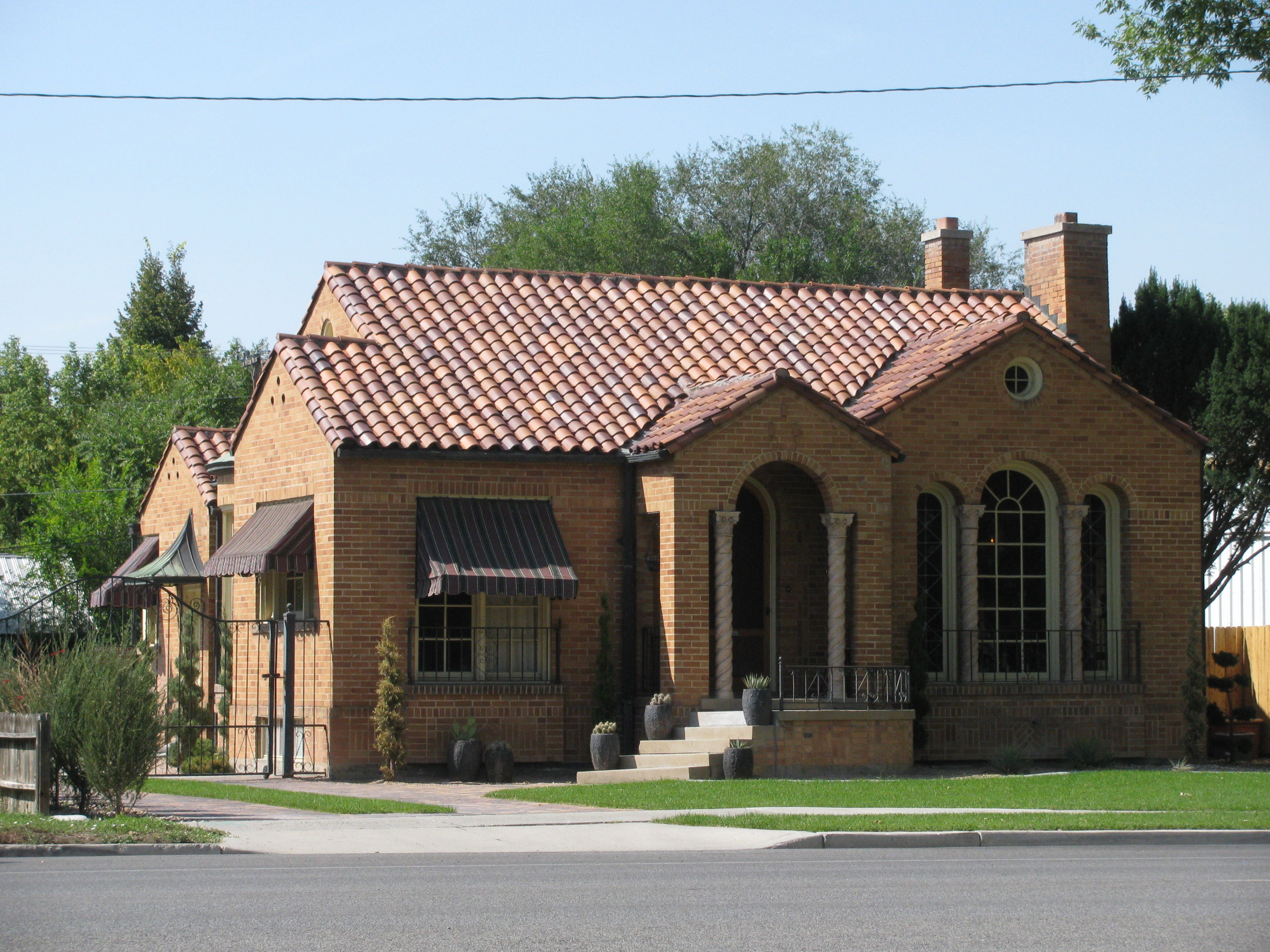

- Location within Utah Location within the United States
- Location: 145 N. Main St., Springville, Utah
- Coordinates: 40°10′9″N 111°36′37″W
- Area: 0.2 acres (0.081 ha)
- Built: 1929
- Architect: Claude Ashworth
- Architectural style: Spanish Colonial Revival
- NRHP reference No.: 90001142
- Added to NRHP: August 3, 1990

The Frederick and Della Dunn House is a historic house located at 145 North Main Street in Springville, Utah.

== Description and history ==
The one-story, Period Revival style cottage was constructed in 1929, and was designed by architect Claude Ashworth (1885–1971). It has one story above ground but also has a full basement. It includes Spanish Colonial Revival architecture, though other influences are evident in various aspects of its design.

It was listed on the National Register of Historic Places on August 3, 1990.

== See also ==
- Springville High School Art Gallery, in Springville, Utah, also NRHP-listed and a work of Claude Ashworth
