= Thornton, Arkansas =

- City
- Location of Thornton in Calhoun County, Arkansas.
- Coordinates: 33°46′32″N 92°29′43″W
- Country: United States
- State: Arkansas
- County: Calhoun

Area
  - Total: 1.94 sq mi (5.03 km^{2})
  - Land: 1.92 sq mi (4.98 km^{2})
  - Water: 0.015 sq mi (0.04 km^{2})
- Elevation: 305 ft (93 m)

Population (2020)
  - Total: 339
  - Estimate (2025): 325 ▼
  - Density: 176.1/sq mi (68.01/km^{2})
- Time zone: UTC−6 (Central (CST))
  - Summer (DST): UTC−5 (CDT)
- ZIP code: 71766
- Area code: 870
- FIPS code: 05-69050
- GNIS feature ID: 2405588

Thornton is a city in Calhoun County, Arkansas, United States. As of the 2020 census, Thornton had a population of 339. It is part of the Camden, Arkansas micropolitan area.

== Geography ==
Thornton is located in northern Calhoun County. U.S. Route 79 passes through the city, leading northeast 6 miles (10 km) to Fordyce and southwest 26 miles (42 km) to Camden. U.S. Route 167 cuts across the southeast corner of the city limits, leading north to US 79 and Fordyce and south 16 miles (26 km) to Hampton, the Calhoun County seat.

According to the United States Census Bureau, Thornton has a total area of 1.9 square miles (5.0 km^{2}), of which 0.02 square miles (0.04 km^{2}), or 0.84%, is water.

== Demographics ==
Historical population
Census	Pop.	Note	%±
1880	150		—
1890	132		−12.0%
1910	611		—
1920	1,312		114.7%
1930	550		−58.1%
1960	658		—
1970	746		13.4%
1980	711		−4.7%
1990	502		−29.4%
2000	517		3.0%
2010	407		−21.3%
2020	339		−16.7%
2025 (est.)	325	▼	−4.1%
U.S. Decennial Census

As of the census of 2000, there were 517 people, 206 households, and 142 families residing in the city. The population density was 270.4 inhabitants per square mile (104.4/km^{2}). There were 242 housing units at an average density of 126.6 per square mile (48.9/km^{2}). The racial makeup of the city was 56.48% White, 41.78% Black or African American, 0.19% Native American, and 1.55% from two or more races. 0.97% of the population were Hispanic or Latino of any race.

There were 206 households, out of which 32.5% had children under the age of 18 living with them, 51.9% were married couples living together, 13.1% had a female householder with no husband present, and 30.6% were non-families. 25.2% of all households were made up of individuals, and 14.1% had someone living alone who was 65 years of age or older. The average household size was 2.51 and the average family size was 2.98.

In the city, the age distribution of the population shows 25.5% under the age of 18, 7.2% from 18 to 24, 32.1% from 25 to 44, 22.1% from 45 to 64, and 13.2% who were 65 years of age or older. The median age was 37 years. For every 100 females, there were 86.0 males. For every 100 females age 18 and over, there were 75.8 males.

The median income for a household in the city was $24,375, and the median income for a family was $31,125. Males had a median income of $33,472 versus $16,071 for females. The per capita income for the city was $14,323. About 26.6% of families and 33.9% of the population were below the poverty line, including 45.1% of those under age 18 and 32.8% of those age 65 or over.

== Climate ==
The climate in this area is characterized by hot, humid summers and generally mild to cool winters. According to the Köppen climate classification system, Thornton has a humid subtropical climate, abbreviated "Cfa" on climate maps.

== Education ==
The Bearden School District serves residents. On July 1, 1985, the Thornton School District consolidated into the Bearden district.

== Notable people ==
- Buddy Turner, former member of the Arkansas House of Representatives.

== See also ==
- List of cities and towns in Arkansas
