= Harrell, Arkansas =

- Town
- Location of Harrell in Calhoun County, Arkansas.
- Coordinates: 33°30′36″N 92°24′00″W
- Country: United States
- State: Arkansas
- County: Calhoun
- Named for: Jedediah Harrell

Area
  - Total: 0.55 sq mi (1.43 km^{2})
  - Land: 0.55 sq mi (1.43 km^{2})
  - Water: 0 sq mi (0.00 km^{2})
- Elevation: 203 ft (62 m)

Population (2020)
  - Total: 210
  - Estimate (2025): 206 ▼
  - Density: 380/sq mi (147/km^{2})
- Time zone: UTC-6 (Central (CST))
  - Summer (DST): UTC-5 (CDT)
- ZIP code: 71745
- Area code: 870
- FIPS code: 05-30310
- GNIS feature ID: 2406646

Harrell is a town in Calhoun County, Arkansas, United States. As of the 2020 census, Harrell had a population of 210. It is part of the Camden micropolitan area.

== Geography ==
According to the United States Census Bureau, the city has a total area of 0.6 square miles (1.6 km^{2}), all land.

== Demographics ==
Historical population
Census	Pop.	Note	%±
1940	273		—
1950	342		25.3%
1960	267		−21.9%
1970	269		0.7%
1980	302		12.3%
1990	258		−14.6%
2000	293		13.6%
2010	254		−13.3%
2020	210		−17.3%
2025 (est.)	206	▼	−1.9%
U.S. Decennial Census

=== 2020 Census ===
Harrell town, Arkansas – Racial and ethnic composition Note: the US Census treats Hispanic/Latino as an ethnic category. This table excludes Latinos from the racial categories and assigns them to a separate category. Hispanics/Latinos may be of any race.
Race / Ethnicity (NH = Non-Hispanic)	Pop 2000	Pop 2010	Pop 2020	% 2000	% 2010	% 2020
White alone (NH)	126	129	120	43.00%	50.79%	57.14%
Black or African American alone (NH)	165	123	81	56.31%	48.43%	38.57%
Native American or Alaska Native alone (NH)	0	0	0	0.00%	0.00%	0.00%
Asian alone (NH)	0	0	0	0.00%	0.00%	0.00%
Native Hawaiian or Pacific Islander alone (NH)	0	0	0	0.00%	0.00%	0.00%
Other race alone (NH)	0	0	0	0.00%	0.00%	0.00%
Mixed race or Multiracial (NH)	2	2	4	0.68%	0.79%	1.90%
Hispanic or Latino (any race)	0	0	5	0.00%	0.00%	2.38%
Total	293	254	210	100.00%	100.00%	100.00%

As of the census of 2000, there were 293 people, 120 households, and 81 families residing in the city. The population density was 472.0 inhabitants per square mile (182.2/km^{2}). There were 139 housing units at an average density of 223.9 per square mile (86.4/km^{2}). The racial makeup of the city was 43.00% White, 56.31% Black or African American, and 0.68% from two or more races.

There were 120 households, out of which 32.5% had children under the age of 18 living with them, 43.3% were married couples living together, 20.8% had a female householder with no husband present, and 32.5% were non-families. 28.3% of all households were made up of individuals, and 13.3% had someone living alone who was 65 years of age or older. The average household size was 2.44 and the average family size was 2.94.

In the city the population was spread out, with 28.3% under the age of 18, 9.2% from 18 to 24, 27.3% from 25 to 44, 19.8% from 45 to 64, and 15.4% who were 65 years of age or older. The median age was 34 years. For every 100 females, there were 83.1 males. For every 100 females age 18 and over, there were 75.0 males.

The median income for a household in the city was $21,875, and the median income for a family was $33,333. Males had a median income of $30,500 versus $14,500 for females. The per capita income for the city was $12,539. About 15.0% of families and 23.5% of the population were below the poverty line, including 25.3% of those under the age of eighteen and 20.0% of those 65 or over.

== Education ==
Public education is available via the Hampton School District based in Hampton, with students graduating from Hampton High School. The school district encompasses 479.67 square miles (1,242.3 km^{2}) of land including all of Hampton and portions of several Calhoun County communities including Camden, Harrell, and Tinsman.
