= Bearden High School (Arkansas) =

Location
- 635 North Plum Street; Bearden, Arkansas 71720; United States; 33°43′54″N 92°37′14″W

Information
- School type: Comprehensive public junior/senior high school
- Status: Open
- School district: Bearden School District
- NCES District ID: 0500032
- Oversight: Arkansas Department of Education (ADE)
- CEEB code: 040135
- NCES School ID: 050003200053
- Faculty: 28.86 (on FTE basis)
- Grades: 7–12
- Enrollment: 231 (2023-2024)
- Student to teacher ratio: 8.00
- Education system: ADE Smart Core curriculum
- Classes offered: Regular, Advanced Placement
- Campus type: Rural
- Colors: Black and white
- Athletics conference: 2A 7 West (2012-14)
- Mascot: Bear
- Team name: Bearden Bears
- Rival: Harmony Grove Hornets
- Accreditation: ADE
- Feeder schools: Bearden Elementary School
- Affiliation: Arkansas Activities Association (AAA)
- Website: www.beardenschools.org/bearden-high-school-2

Bearden High School is a comprehensive public junior/senior high school serving grades seven through twelve in the rural, remote community of Bearden, Arkansas, United States. Located in Ouachita County, Bearden High School is one of four public high schools in the county and is the sole high school managed by the Bearden School District.

== Curriculum ==
The assumed course of study at Bearden High School is the Smart Core curriculum developed by the Arkansas Department of Education (ADE). Students engage in regular and Advanced Placement (AP) coursework and exams to obtain at least 22 units required by the Smart Core curriculum. The Bearden School District offers students regular or advanced diplomas, based on coursework and grade point average. The school has been accredited by AdvancED since 1982. Exceptional students have been recognized as National Merit Finalists and participated in Arkansas Governor's School.

== Athletics ==
The Bearden High School mascot is the bear with black and white serving as the school colors.

For the 2012–14 seasons, the Bearden Bears participate in the 2A 7 West Conference. Competition is primarily sanctioned by the Arkansas Activities Association with the Bears competing in baseball, basketball (boys/girls), cheer, cross country (girls), softball, and track and field (boys/girls).

The Bearden Bears football team were Class 2A state finalists in 2007 and 2009, and semi-finalists in 2008 and 2010. The Bears have won conference titles in 1992, 1996, 1997, 2007, 2009, and 2010. The Harmony Grove Hornets compete as rivals to the Bearden Bears in an annual matchup with the game winner capturing the Bill Manning Rivalry Trophy.
