= Tinsman, Arkansas =

- Town
- Location of Tinsman in Calhoun County, Arkansas.
- Coordinates: 33°37′35″N 92°21′18″W
- Country: United States
- State: Arkansas
- County: Calhoun

Area
  - Total: 0.53 sq mi (1.37 km^{2})
  - Land: 0.53 sq mi (1.37 km^{2})
  - Water: 0 sq mi (0.00 km^{2})
- Elevation: 174 ft (53 m)

Population (2020)
  - Total: 50
  - Estimate (2025): 51 ▲
  - Density: 94.2/sq mi (36.39/km^{2})
- Time zone: UTC-6 (Central (CST))
  - Summer (DST): UTC-5 (CDT)
- FIPS code: 05-69350
- GNIS feature ID: 2406737

Tinsman is a town in Calhoun County, Arkansas, United States. As of the 2020 census, Tinsman had a population of 50. It is part of the Camden Micropolitan Statistical Area.

== Geography ==
According to the United States Census Bureau, the city has a total area of 0.5 square miles (1.3 km^{2}), all land.

== Demographics ==
Historical population
Census	Pop.	Note	%±
1920	248		—
1930	177		−28.6%
1970	113		—
1980	112		−0.9%
1990	69		−38.4%
2000	75		8.7%
2010	54		−28.0%
2020	50		−7.4%
2025 (est.)	51	▲	2.0%
U.S. Decennial Census

As of the census of 2000, there were 75 people, 31 households, and 20 families residing in the city. The population density was 137.7 inhabitants per square mile (53.2/km^{2}). There were 49 housing units at an average density of 89.9 per square mile (34.7/km^{2}). The racial makeup of the city was 93.33% White and 6.67% Black or African American.

There were 31 households, out of which 22.6% had children under the age of 18 living with them, 51.6% were married couples living together, 12.9% had a female householder with no husband present, and 32.3% were non-families. 29.0% of all households were made up of individuals, and 22.6% had someone living alone who was 65 years of age or older. The average household size was 2.42 and the average family size was 3.00.

In the city the population was spread out, with 24.0% under the age of 18, 6.7% from 18 to 24, 21.3% from 25 to 44, 18.7% from 45 to 64, and 29.3% who were 65 years of age or older. The median age was 42 years. For every 100 females, there were 70.5 males. For every 100 females age 18 and over, there were 78.1 males.

The median income for a household in the city was $24,107, and the median income for a family was $24,643. Males had a median income of $23,750 versus $23,750 for females. The per capita income for the city was $9,302. There were 13.6% of families and 32.1% of the population living below the poverty line, including 47.6% of under eighteens and 23.5% of those over 64.

== Education ==
Public education is available via Hampton School District based in Hampton, with students graduating from Hampton High School. The school district encompasses 479.67 square miles (1,242.3 km^{2}) of land including all of Hampton and portions of several Calhoun County communities including Camden, Harrell, and Tinsman.

== Images ==
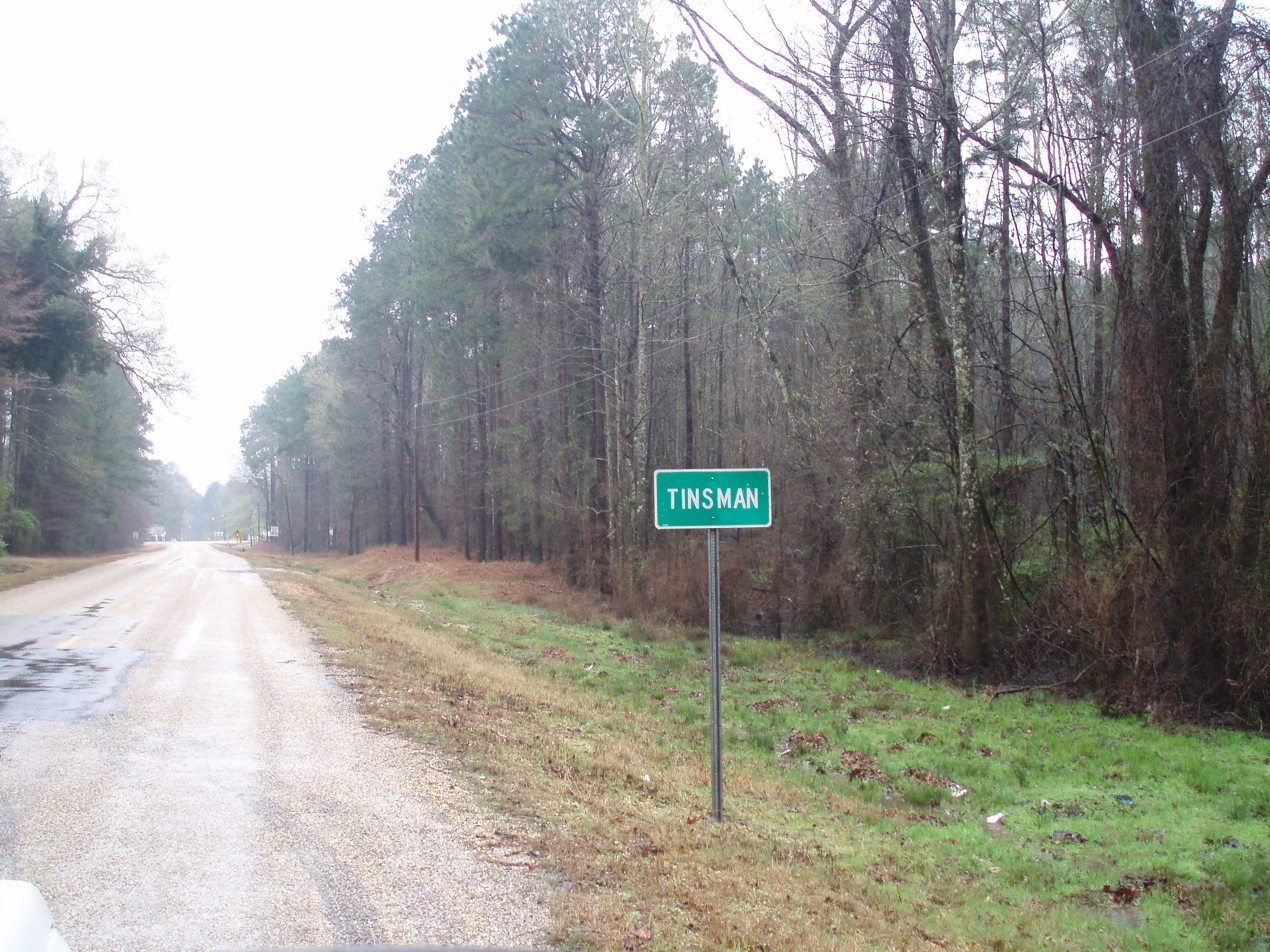
Sign while entering Tinsman

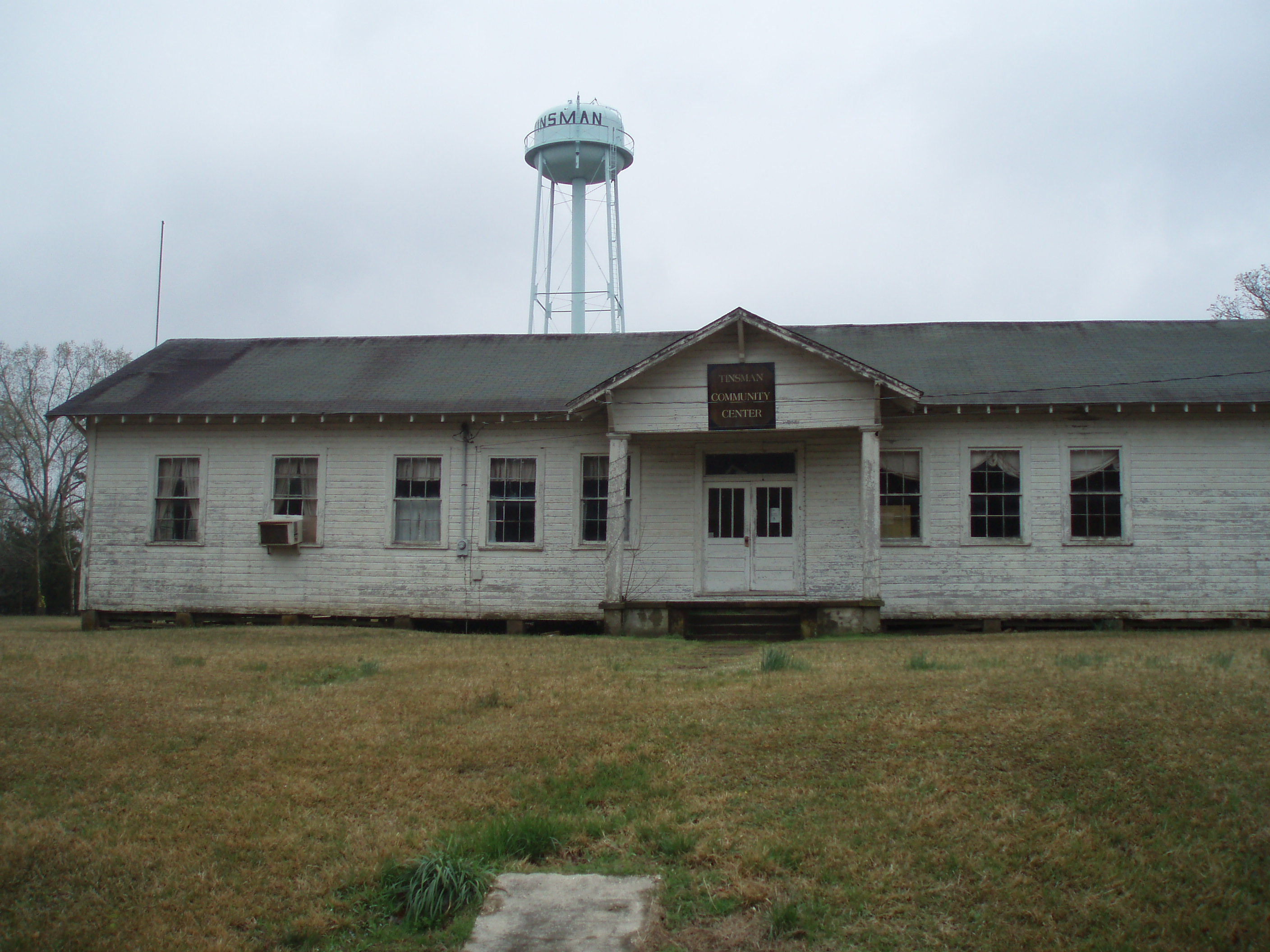
Tinsman Community Center and Water Tower

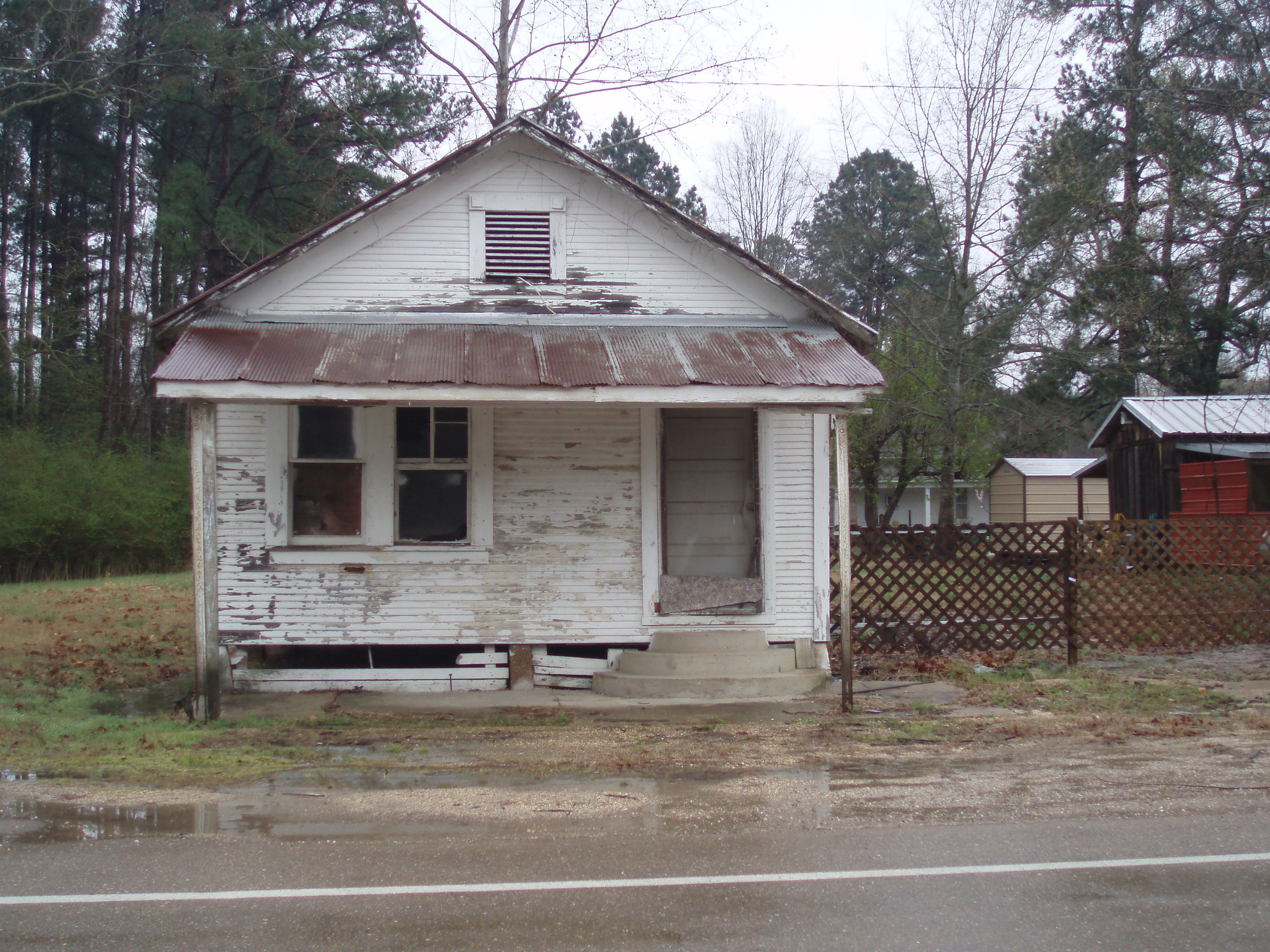
Abandoned Post Office in Tinsman
