= Bearden School District (Oklahoma) =

School district in Oklahoma

Address
- 372006 OK-48 Okfuskee County Okemah, Oklahoma; United States
- Coordinates: 35.3487°N 96.3877°W

District information
- Type: Public
- Grades: K–8
- Schools: 1
- Budget: $1,028,000 (2015-16)
- NCES District ID: 4003690

Students and staff
- Students: 146 (2018-19)
- Teachers: 8.99 FTE
- Staff: 10.93
- Student–teacher ratio: 16.24

Other information
- Website: www.bearden.k12.ok.us

The Bearden Independent School District is a school district based in Bearden, Oklahoma United States. It consists of Bearden Public School that supports more than 100 students in kindergarten through grade 8.

== See also ==
- List of school districts in Oklahoma
