= Hampton, Arkansas =

- Town
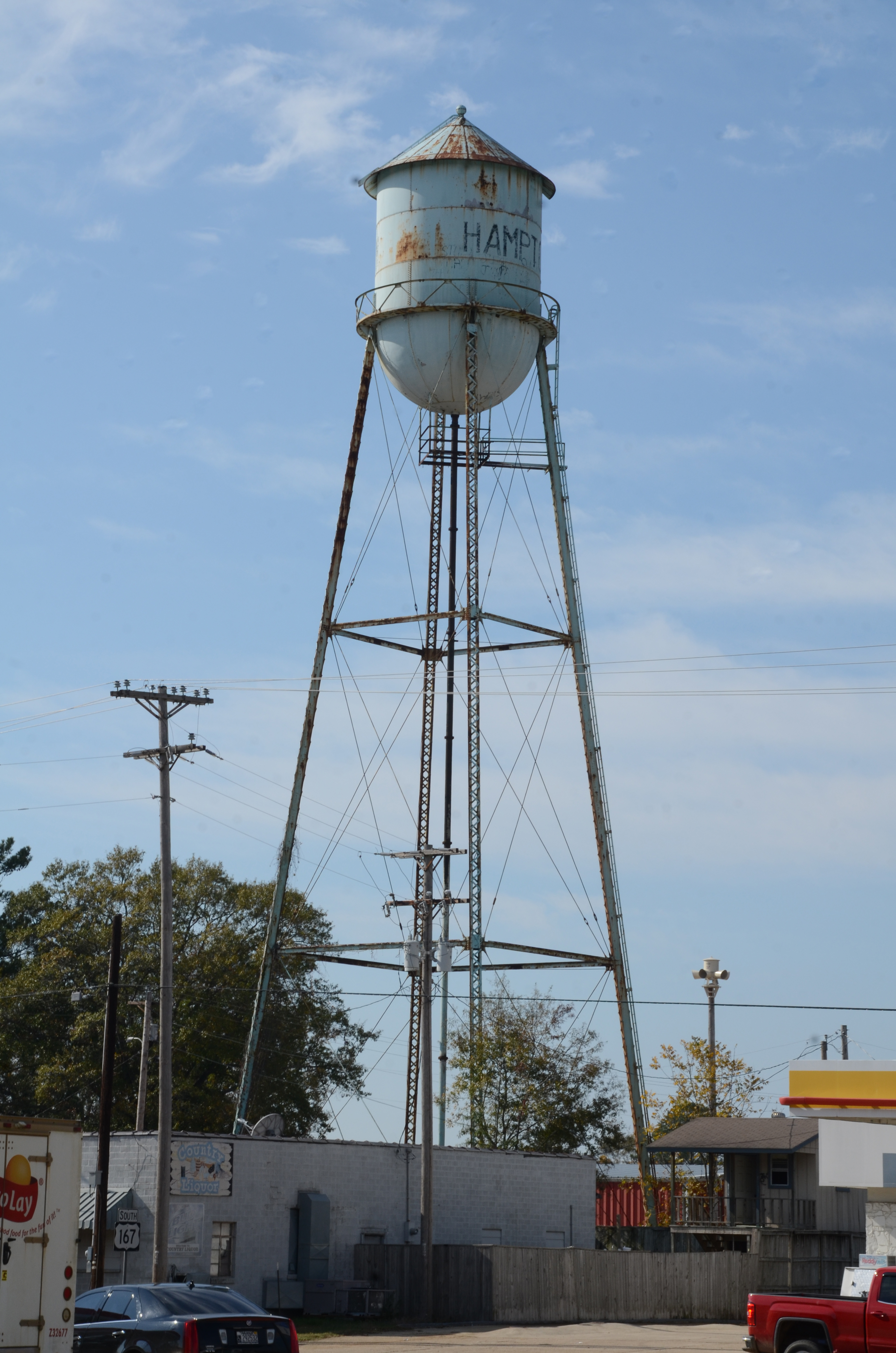
- Historic Hampton Waterworks

- Location of Hampton in Calhoun County, Arkansas.
- Coordinates: 33°32′05″N 92°28′00″W
- Country: United States
- State: Arkansas
- County: Calhoun

Area
  - Total: 3.28 sq mi (8.49 km^{2})
  - Land: 3.28 sq mi (8.49 km^{2})
  - Water: 0 sq mi (0.00 km^{2})
- Elevation: 187 ft (57 m)

Population (2020)
  - Total: 1,181
  - Estimate (2025): 1,145 ▼
  - Density: 360.3/sq mi (139.12/km^{2})
- Time zone: UTC-6 (Central (CST))
  - Summer (DST): UTC-5 (CDT)
- ZIP code: 71744
- Area code: 870
- FIPS code: 05-29650
- GNIS feature ID: 2403789
- Website: cityofhamptonar.gov

Hampton is a town in Calhoun County, Arkansas, United States. The population was 1,181 according to the 2020 United States census. The town is the county seat of Calhoun County.

Hampton is part of the Camden Micropolitan Statistical Area.

== Geography ==
Hampton is located east of the center of Calhoun County. U.S. Routes 278 and 167 intersect in the town. US 278 leads west 23 miles (37 km) to Camden and east 26 miles (42 km) to Warren, while US 167 leads north 21 miles (34 km) to Fordyce and south 27 miles (43 km) to El Dorado.

According to the United States Census Bureau, the town has a total area of 3.0 square miles (7.8 km^{2}), all land.

== Demographics ==
Historical population
Census	Pop.	Note	%±
1860	166		—
1870	138		−16.9%
1880	150		8.7%
1890	406		170.7%
1910	353		—
1920	271		−23.2%
1930	669		146.9%
1940	686		2.5%
1950	838		22.2%
1960	1,011		20.6%
1970	1,252		23.8%
1980	1,627		30.0%
1990	1,562		−4.0%
2000	1,579		1.1%
2010	1,324		−16.1%
2020	1,181		−10.8%
2025 (est.)	1,145	▼	−3.0%
U.S. Decennial Census

=== 2020 census ===
Hampton racial composition
Race	Num.	Perc.
White (non-Hispanic)	724	61.3%
Black or African American (non-Hispanic)	350	29.64%
Asian	1	0.08%
Pacific Islander	1	0.08%
Other/Mixed	59	5.0%
Hispanic or Latino	46	3.9%

As of the 2020 United States census, there were 1,181 people, 619 households, and 390 families residing in the town.

=== 2000 census ===
As of the census of 2000, there were 1,579 people, 619 households, and 402 families residing in the town. The population density was 522.4 inhabitants per square mile (201.7/km^{2}). There were 699 housing units at an average density of 231.2 per square mile (89.3/km^{2}). The racial makeup of the town was 66.18% White, 32.05% Black or African American, 0.06% Native American, 1.08% from other races, and 0.63% from two or more races. 1.39% of the population were Hispanic or Latino of any race.

There were 619 households, out of which 30.5% had children under the age of 18 living with them, 44.3% were married couples living together, 17.6% had a female householder with no husband present, and 34.9% were non-families. 32.8% of all households were made up of individuals, and 13.9% had someone living alone who was 65 years of age or older. The average household size was 2.36 and the average family size was 2.99.

In the town, the population was spread out, with 25.0% under the age of 18, 7.5% from 18 to 24, 25.0% from 25 to 44, 22.5% from 45 to 64, and 19.9% who were 65 years of age or older. The median age was 40 years. For every 100 females, there were 79.2 males. For every 100 females age 18 and over, there were 74.9 males.

The median income for a household in the town was $25,057, and the median income for a family was $29,948. Males had a median income of $29,375 versus $18,583 for females. The per capita income for the town was $15,489. About 19.7% of families and 22.9% of the population were below the poverty line, including 30.3% of those under age 18 and 20.7% of those age 65 or over.

== Education ==
Public education is available via Hampton School District based in Hampton, with students graduating from Hampton High School. The school district encompasses 479.67 square miles (1,242.3 km^{2}) of land including all of Hampton and portions of several Calhoun County communities including Harrell, and Tinsman, and Locust Bayou.

== Transport ==
Hampton is centered at the intersection of US routes 278 and 167. Arkansas Highway 274 also runs through Hampton in a U-formation, with the northern portion running concurrently with US 167 northwards while another end continues to the northeast towards Tinsman. Arkansas Highway 203 also starts in central Hampton and runs to the northwest.

A small airstrip is located immediately to the south of Hampton, though it does not hold an air traffic control tower. Air transport to Hampton's closest links are through Harrell Field in northeast Camden for general aviation and South Arkansas Regional Airport in western El Dorado for commercial service. The closest airport with over one million passengers per year is Clinton National Airport in Little Rock, and the closest airport with direct international flights is Memphis International Airport.

== Notable people ==
- Wayne Harris, NFF College Hall of Fame player at Arkansas
- Harry Thomason, film and television director and producer

== See also ==
- National Register of Historic Places listings in Calhoun County, Arkansas
