= Calhoun County, Arkansas =

County in Arkansas, United States

- County
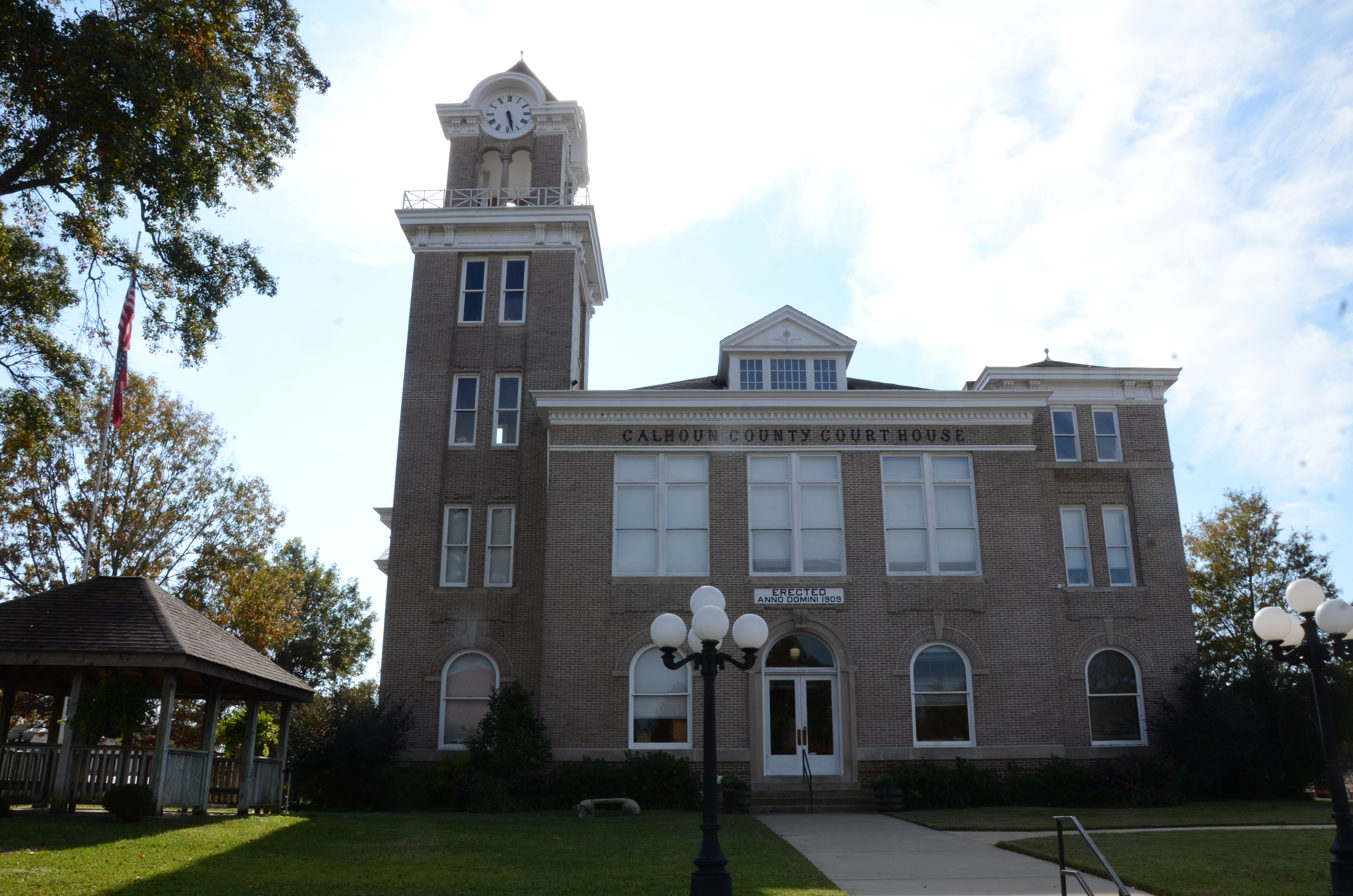
- Calhoun County Courthouse in Hampton

- Seal

- Location within the U.S. state of Arkansas
- Coordinates: 33°34′15″N 92°31′25″W
- Country: United States
- State: Arkansas
- Founded: December 6, 1850
- Named for: John C. Calhoun
- Seat: Hampton
- Largest city: Hampton

Area
  - Total: 632 sq mi (1,640 km^{2})
  - Land: 629 sq mi (1,630 km^{2})
  - Water: 3.8 sq mi (9.8 km^{2}) 0.6%

Population (2020)
  - Total: 4,739
  - Estimate (2025): 4,632 ▼
  - Density: 7.53/sq mi (2.91/km^{2})
- Time zone: UTC−6 (Central)
  - Summer (DST): UTC−5 (CDT)
- Congressional district: 4th
- Website: www.calhouncountyar.com

Calhoun County is a county located in the south central part of the U.S. state of Arkansas. As of the 2020 census, the population was 4,739, making it the least populous county in Arkansas. The county seat is Hampton. Calhoun County is Arkansas's 55th county, formed on December 6, 1850, and named for John C. Calhoun, a Vice President of the United States.

The county is part of the Camden, AR Micropolitan Statistical Area.

== History ==
This area was initially developed for plantation agriculture, based on large gangs of slave workers. The population was majority enslaved African Americans before the American Civil War. After the Reconstruction era, there was increasing white violence against blacks as the minority attempted to assert dominance over the freedmen. From 1877 to 1950, whites lynched 10 African Americans in the county, mostly in the decades around the turn of the century. Several other counties in the state had higher rates of such murders.

In September 1892, what became known as the Hampton Race War—also referred to as the Calhoun County Race War in many sources—broke out across the southern part of the county. In 1891 the Democratic-dominated state legislature had passed laws to make voter registration more difficult for illiterate people both black and white, which effectively disenfranchised many of the poorer residents. But tensions were rising in this period, and the economy was poor. Whites resented that freedmen would work for lower wages, even if they knew the latter men seldom had a choice. Whitecappers, also called night riders, were poor white farmers and workers who acted as vigilantes, attacking various residents to enforce their moral views. They met in secret societies to patrol both black and white communities. Their reasons were also economic; they hoped to drive out the black workers.

The African Americans resented these attacks. Newspapers printed rumors of armed blacks planning attacks against whites, as was typical in tense times, inflaming existing tensions. There was also violence associated with the September election. Some newspapers reported that a white man named Unsill, an ex-convict Republican, led 42 armed blacks to the polls, "where they demanded to vote." Accounts of this period are contradictory, but agree that major events seemed to take place within several days, beginning about September 17, while incidents were reported over the month of September. An estimated five to eight African Americans were killed during the violence, with one or more described as lynched. At least two whites were killed in these encounters; more men on both sides were wounded. Among the dead was a black man murdered by two whites; as he was a key witness in a trial in which they were defendants, this appeared to be a "murder of convenience" done while other violence was prevalent.

=== 20th century to present ===
Due to such violence, social oppression, economic problems, and mechanization of agriculture, many African Americans and whites left the county in the first half of the 20th century. Population declined in every census after 1920 through 1970, as may be seen in the table in the Demographics section below. African Americans left in the Great Migration to northern and midwestern industrial cities for work before World War II; during and after that war, many others went to the West Coast, where defense industries had more jobs.

The Shumaker Naval Ammunition Depot in Calhoun and Ouachita counties operated from 1945 until 1957.

The Southern Arkansas University Tech is a two-year college specializing in technical training.

==== The Lost 40 Acres of Timber ====
There are 40 acres of timber that have never been cut along the Wolf Branch (a tributary of Moro Creek) in southeast Calhoun County. Some of its large trees are over 200 years old.

== Geography ==
According to the U.S. Census Bureau, the county has a total area of 632 square miles (1,640 km^{2}), of which 629 square miles (1,630 km^{2}) is land and 3.8 square miles (9.8 km^{2}) (0.6%) is water.

=== Major highways ===
- Future Interstate 69
- U.S. Highway 79
- U.S. Highway 167
- U.S. Highway 278
- Highway 8
- Highway 160
- Highway 203
- Highway 205
- Highway 274
- Highway 275

=== Adjacent counties ===
- Dallas County (north)
- Cleveland County (northeast)
- Bradley County (east)
- Union County (south)
- Ouachita County (west)

== Demographics ==
Historical population
Census	Pop.	Note	%±
1860	4,103		—
1870	3,853		−6.1%
1880	5,671		47.2%
1890	7,267		28.1%
1900	8,539		17.5%
1910	9,894		15.9%
1920	11,807		19.3%
1930	9,752		−17.4%
1940	9,636		−1.2%
1950	7,132		−26.0%
1960	5,991		−16.0%
1970	5,573		−7.0%
1980	6,079		9.1%
1990	5,826		−4.2%
2000	5,744		−1.4%
2010	5,368		−6.5%
2020	4,739		−11.7%
2025 (est.)	4,632	▼	−2.3%
U.S. Decennial Census; 1790–1960 1900–1990; 1990–2000 2010–2016

=== 2020 census ===
As of the 2020 census, the county had a population of 4,739. The median age was 44.6 years. 20.2% of residents were under the age of 18 and 20.2% of residents were 65 years of age or older. For every 100 females there were 98.5 males, and for every 100 females age 18 and over there were 97.1 males age 18 and over.

The racial makeup of the county was 74.7% White, 19.3% Black or African American, 0.2% American Indian and Alaska Native, 0.1% Asian, 0.2% Native Hawaiian and Pacific Islander, 1.1% from some other race, and 4.4% from two or more races. Hispanic or Latino residents of any race comprised 2.7% of the population.

<0.1% of residents lived in urban areas, while 100.0% lived in rural areas.

There were 2,019 households in the county, of which 27.7% had children under the age of 18 living in them. Of all households, 46.3% were married-couple households, 21.6% were households with a male householder and no spouse or partner present, and 26.5% were households with a female householder and no spouse or partner present. About 32.0% of all households were made up of individuals and 14.1% had someone living alone who was 65 years of age or older.

There were 2,444 housing units, of which 17.4% were vacant. Among occupied housing units, 79.7% were owner-occupied and 20.3% were renter-occupied. The homeowner vacancy rate was 1.4% and the rental vacancy rate was 17.5%.

=== 2000 census ===
As of the 2000 United States census, there were 5,744 people, 2,317 households, and 1,628 families residing in the county. The population density was 9 people per square mile (3.5 people/km^{2}). There were 3,012 housing units at an average density of 5 units per square mile (1.9 units/km^{2}). The racial makeup of the county was 74.51% White, 23.38% Black or African American, 0.21% Native American, 0.03% Asian, 0.92% from other races, and 0.94% from two or more races. 1.50% of the population were Hispanic or Latino of any race.

There were 2,317 households, out of which 31.20% had children under the age of 18 living with them, 55.60% were married couples living together, 11.30% had a female householder with no husband present, and 29.70% were non-families. 27.30% of all households were made up of individuals, and 12.60% had someone living alone who was 65 years of age or older. The average household size was 2.43 and the average family size was 2.94.

In the county, the population was spread out, with 24.60% under the age of 18, 7.00% from 18 to 24, 28.20% from 25 to 44, 24.30% from 45 to 64, and 16.00% who were 65 years of age or older. The median age was 39 years. For every 100 females, there were 92.70 males. For every 100 females age 18 and over, there were 88.30 males.

The median income for a household in the county was $28,438, and the median income for a family was $34,647. Males had a median income of $30,353 versus $17,452 for females. The per capita income for the county was $15,555. About 13.20% of families and 16.50% of the population were below the poverty line, including 19.90% of those under age 18 and 18.20% of those age 65 or over.

== Government ==
=== Government ===
The county government is a constitutional body granted specific powers by the Constitution of Arkansas and the Arkansas Code. The quorum court is the legislative branch of the county government and controls all spending and revenue collection. Representatives are called justices of the peace and are elected from county districts every even-numbered year. The number of districts in a county vary from nine to fifteen, and district boundaries are drawn by the county election commission. The Calhoun County Quorum Court has nine members. Presiding over quorum court meetings is the county judge, who serves as the chief operating officer of the county. The county judge is elected at-large and does not vote in quorum court business, although capable of vetoing quorum court decisions.

Calhoun County, Arkansas Elected countywide officials
Position	Officeholder	Party
County Judge	Floyd Nutt	Republican
County/Circuit Clerk	Jeanie Smith	Republican
Sheriff/Collector	Vernon Morris	Republican
Treasurer	Jennifer Beene	Republican
Assessor	Teresa Carter	Republican
Coroner	April McGilton	(Unknown)

The composition of the Quorum Court following the 2024 elections is at least 8 Republicans. Justices of the Peace (members) of the Quorum Court following the elections are:

- District 1: Thomas R. Stringfellow (R)
- District 2: Keith Gresham (R)
- District 3: David Reddin (R)
- District 4: Jimmy Dale Williams (R)
- District 5: Randy Duncan (R)
- District 6: John Beasley (R)
- District 7: Kenneth "Kenny" Evans (R)
- District 8: Mark Hornaday (R)
- District 9: Michael Gardner (party affiliation unknown)

Additionally, the townships of Calhoun County are entitled to elect their own respective constables, as set forth by the Constitution of Arkansas. Constables are largely of historical significance as they were used to keep the peace in rural areas when travel was more difficult. The township constables as of the 2024 elections are:

- District 2: Leland Gilliam (R)
- District 6: Johnny Greene (R)

=== Politics ===
Over the past few election cycles Calhoun County has trended heavily towards the GOP. The last Democrat (as of 2024) to carry this county was Bill Clinton in 1996.

United States presidential election results for Calhoun County, Arkansas
Year	Republican		Democratic		Third party(ies)	
Year	No.	%	No.	%	No.	%
1896	216	19.12%	910	80.53%	4	0.35%
1900	244	27.11%	654	72.67%	2	0.22%
1904	235	31.63%	501	67.43%	7	0.94%
1908	234	29.29%	554	69.34%	11	1.38%
1912	72	9.05%	438	55.03%	286	35.93%
1916	275	22.76%	933	77.24%	0	0.00%
1920	337	29.59%	736	64.62%	66	5.79%
1924	150	20.13%	553	74.23%	42	5.64%
1928	262	25.36%	765	74.06%	6	0.58%
1932	59	4.53%	1,235	94.85%	8	0.61%
1936	30	4.08%	704	95.78%	1	0.14%
1940	44	5.10%	818	94.90%	0	0.00%
1944	122	11.87%	906	88.13%	0	0.00%
1948	45	4.90%	768	83.66%	105	11.44%
1952	272	16.93%	1,332	82.89%	3	0.19%
1956	445	25.26%	1,303	73.95%	14	0.79%
1960	295	18.46%	1,151	72.03%	152	9.51%
1964	889	38.29%	1,409	60.68%	24	1.03%
1968	287	13.11%	688	31.42%	1,215	55.48%
1972	1,298	64.26%	707	35.00%	15	0.74%
1976	495	19.69%	2,014	80.11%	5	0.20%
1980	896	37.40%	1,438	60.02%	62	2.59%
1984	1,474	58.15%	1,058	41.74%	3	0.12%
1988	1,316	56.14%	1,024	43.69%	4	0.17%
1992	1,047	38.75%	1,389	51.41%	266	9.84%
1996	727	31.72%	1,306	56.98%	259	11.30%
2000	1,128	51.62%	1,017	46.54%	40	1.83%
2004	1,340	58.29%	939	40.84%	20	0.87%
2008	1,462	65.94%	691	31.17%	64	2.89%
2012	1,458	67.07%	660	30.36%	56	2.58%
2016	1,556	68.58%	639	28.16%	74	3.26%
2020	1,636	74.98%	479	21.95%	67	3.07%
2024	1,674	80.02%	379	18.12%	39	1.86%

== Education ==
Public education for elementary and secondary school students is primarily provided by the Hampton School District, which leads to graduation from Hampton High School.

== Communities ==
=== Cities ===
- Hampton (county seat)
- Thornton

=== Towns ===
- Harrell
- Tinsman

=== Townships ===
Note: Unlike most counties, Calhoun County has numbered townships instead of named townships.

Townships in Arkansas are the divisions of a county. Each township includes unincorporated areas; some may have incorporated cities or towns within part of their boundaries. Arkansas townships have limited purposes in modern times. However, the United States census does list Arkansas population based on townships (sometimes referred to as "county subdivisions" or "minor civil divisions"). Townships are also of value for historical purposes in terms of genealogical research. Each town or city is within one or more townships in an Arkansas county based on census maps and publications. The townships of Calhoun County are listed below; listed in parentheses are the cities, towns, and/or census-designated places that are fully or partially inside the township.

- Township 1 (Thornton)
- Township 2
- Township 3 (Tinsman)
- Township 4 (Harrell)
- Township 5
- Township 6
- Township 7
- Township 8 (part of Hampton)
- Township 9 (most of Hampton)

== See also ==
- List of lakes in Calhoun County, Arkansas
- National Register of Historic Places listings in Calhoun County, Arkansas
