= List of bridges on the National Register of Historic Places in Arkansas =

This is a list of bridges and tunnels on the National Register of Historic Places in the U.S. state of Arkansas.

Name	Image	Built	Listed	Location	County	Type
Amboy Overpass	Amboy Overpass	1941	1995-05-18 removed 2022-09-01	North Little Rock; 34°48′5″N 92°17′30″W	Pulaski	Demolished in 2017
AR 7/AR 51 Bridge	AR 7/AR 51 Bridge	1933	2006-02-01	Arkadelphia; 34°7′23″N 93°2′47″W	Clark	Parker through truss
AR 57 Bridge	AR 57 Bridge	1928, 1955	2005-09-28	Stephens; 33°24′46″N 93°4′10″W	Ouachita	Parker pony truss
AR 96 Bridge	AR 96 Bridge	1938	1995-05-05	Greenwood; 35°13′8″N 94°13′16″W	Sebastian	Steel pony truss; listed bridge has been demolished.
AR 274 Bridge		1940	1995-05-18 removed 2026-01-16	Thornton; 33°37′48″N 92°42′32″W	Calhoun	
AR 289 Bridge Over English Creek		1929	2009-1-22	Mammoth Spring vicinity	Fulton	
Asher Avenue Overpass		1940	2024-04-30	Little Rock; 34°43′54.5″N 92°18′12.6″W	Pulaski	Steel stringer
Batesville Overpass		1936	2021-09-17	Batesville; 35°46′51.6″N 91°37′32.9″W	Independence	Concrete tee-beam
Beaver Bridge	Beaver Bridge	1949	1990-04-09	Beaver; 36°28′15″N 93°46′6″W	Carroll	Suspension
Big Botton Slough Bridge	Big Bottom Slough Bridge	1909	2004-09-24	Magness; 35°40′19″N 91°28′38″W	Independence	Pratt through truss
Big Piney Creek Bridge	Big Piney Creek Bridge	1931	1990-04-09	Hagersville; 35°40′37″N 93°14′10″W	Johnson	Warren through truss
Bridge Street Bridge		1937	2020-09-10	Jonesboro; 35°50′36.2″N 90°41′58.2″W	Craighead	Concrete tee-beam
Brush Creek Bridge		ca. 1959	2025-01-08	Marshall; 35°54′58.7″N 92°37′45.7″W	Searcy	
Buffalo River Bridge	Buffalo River Bridge	1931	1990-04-09	Pruitt; 36°3′38″N 93°8′18″W	Newton	Pennsylvania through truss
Cabin Creek Bridge		ca. 1930	2023-01-24	Lamar; 35°25′12.4″N 91°40′09.7″W	Johnson	Cement slab
Cache River Bridge	Cache River Bridge	1934	1990-04-09	Walnut Ridge; 36°4′9″N 90°49′28″W	Lawrence	Parker pony truss
Cane Hill Road Bridge	Cane Hill Road Bridge	1923	2010-01-21	Prairie Grove vicinity 36°0′1″N 94°16′30″W	Washington	Closed-spandrel arch
Cannon Creek Bridge	Cannon Creek Bridge	1929, 1954	2004-09-22	Cannon Creek; 35°54′26″N 93°56′44″W	Madison	Reinforced concrete deck
Cedar Creek Bridge (Rosie)		1941	1995-05-18	Rosie; 35°38′34″N 91°32′26″W	Independence	Closed spandrel deck arch
Cedar Creek Bridge (Petit Jean State Park)	Cedar Creek Bridge	1934	1990-04-09	Petit Jean State Park; 35°7′43″N 92°55′30″W	Conway	Closed spandrel deck arch
Central Avenue Bridge		1930	2010-01-21	Batesville	Independence	
Chicago, Rock Island & Pacific Railway Overpass			2024-09-35	Little Rock; 34°39′26.6″N 92°19′20.3″W	Pulaski	
College Street Bridge			2026-01-16	Coal Hill; 35°26′03.4″N 93°41′07.1″W	Johnson	
Coon Creek Bridge		1930, 1957	2007-01-24	Cherokee City; 36°19′29″N 94°33′14″W	Benton	Warren pony truss
Coop Creek Bridge		1940	1995-05-05	Mansfield; 35°3′27″N 94°14′10″W	Sebastian	Open masonry substructure
Cotter Bridge		1930	1990-04-04	Cotter; 36°16′3″N 92°32′50″W	Baxter	Rainbow arch
Cotter Tunnel	Amboy Overpass	1903, 1957	2007-09-19	Cotter; 36°16′31″N 92°32′47″W	Marion	
County Road 2E Bridge	County Road 2E Bridge	1940	1995-05-05	Scotland; 35°30′41″N 92°41′53″W	Van Buren	Open masonry substructure
County Road 4G Bridge		1940	1995-05-05	West Hartford; 34°59′25″N 94°25′7″W	Sebastian	Open masonry substructure
County Road 5G Bridge		1943	1995-05-05	Hartford; 35°0′57″N 94°23′37″W	Sebastian	Open masonry substructure; delisted in 2009
County Road 6 Bridge		by 1915	2004-09-24	Cincinnati; 36°4′15″N 94°28′30″W	Washington	Warren pony truss
County Road 513C Bridge		1942	1995-05-18	Dixie; 35°55′12″N 90°25′23″W	Craighead	Steel deck truss
Cove Creek Bridge		1957	2004-05-24	Martinville; 35°19′23″N 92°29′8″W	Conway	Pratt through truss
Cove Creek Bridge	Cove Creek Bridge (Corley, Arkansas)	1936	1995-05-26	Corley; 35°11′35″N 93°37′24″W	Logan	Masonry closed spandrel arch
Cove Creek Bridge		1930	2024-09-10	Leslie; 35°49′41.9″N 92°33′42.8″W	Searcy	Concrete tee-beam
Cove Creek Tributary Bridge	Cove Creek Tributary Bridge	1936	1995-05-26	Corley; 35°14′31″N 93°38′22″W	Logan	Masonry closed spandrel arch
Cove Lake Spillway Dam-Bridge	Cove Lake Spillway Dam-Bridge	1937	1995-09-11	Corley; 35°13′58″N 93°37′45″W	Logan	Rustic
Cricket and Crest Tunnels Historic District		1903, 1957	2007-09-19	Omaha	Boone	
Crooked Creek Bridge	Crooked Creek Bridge	1923	2010-01-21	Pyatt; 36°14′54″N 92°50′37″W	Marion	
Crowley's Ridge State Park-Bridge	Crowley's Ridge State Park-Bridge	ca. 1935	1992-05-28	Walcott; 36°2′42″N 90°39′47″W	Greene	
De Queen & Eastern Railroad Overpass		1938	2023-05-19	Lockesburg; 33°58′11.6″N 94°10′06.2″W	Sevier	Concrete tee-beam
DeGray Creek Bridge		1915	2010-01-21	Arkadelphia	Clark	
Dry Run Bridge		1933	2022-09-26	Bethesda; 35°46′31.0″N 91°40′09.7″W	Independence	Steel stringer
Edgemere Street Bridge	Edgemere Street Bridge	1930s	1990-04-09	North Little Rock; 34°47′40″N 92°15′0″W	Pulaski	Closed spandrel deck arch
Evansville-Dutch Mills Road Bridge		1936	2008-01-24	Dutch Mills; 35°51′55″N 94°29′59″W	Washington	Closed spandrel concrete arch
Fordyce Overpass		1949	2023-09-11	Fordyce; 33°48′53.3″N 92°24′39.2″W	Dallas	Steel stringer
Fourche LaFave River Bridge	Fourche Lafave Bridge	1941	1995-05-26	Nimrod; 34°57′7″N 93°9′8″W	Perry	Open masonry
Frog Bayou Bridge		1942	1995-05-26	Mountainburg; 35°37′4″N 94°11′3″W	Crawford	Parker through truss
Goff Farm Stone Bridge		c. 1860	2010-01-21	Fayetteville vicinity	Washington	
Hackett Creek Bridge		1941	1995-05-05	Hackett; 35°11′35″N 94°24′51″W	Sebastian	Open masonry substructure
Haggard Ford Swinging Bridge		ca. 1938	1995-06-30	Harrison; 36°20′45″N 93°7′50″W	Boone	Suspension
Hale Creek Bridge	Hale Creek Bridge	1919	2004-05-26	Red Wing; 34°4′47″N 94°11′9″W	Sevier	Pratt pony truss
Harp Creek Bridge	Harp Creek Bridge	1928	1990-04-09	Jasper; 36°4′58″N 93°8′14″W	Newton	Open spandrel deck arch
Harris Creek Bridge		1912	2026-01-16	Dardanelle; 35°09′45.7″N 93°10′18.0″W	Yell	Concrete arch
Highway A-1 Bridge			2021-01-11	Plumerville; 35°09′25.0″N 92°37′36.4″W	Conway	
Highway A-2 Bridges			2026-01-16	Curtis; 34°00′15.7″N 93°05′49.0″W	Clark	
Highway B-1, Little Telico Creek Bridge		ca. 1918	2009-5-20	SFC 213 Rd. over Little Telico Creek; 35°3′56.72″N 90°48′57.32″W	St. Francis	
Highway B-29 Bridge		1923	2008-9-24	Prairie Grove; 35°59′41.98″N 94°17′53.4″W	Washington	
Hillsboro Street Viaduct		1935	2022-01-07	El Dorado; 33°12′26.6″N 92°39′43.9″W	Union	Concrete tee-beam
I-40 Overpass			2021-09-15	Blackwell; 35°13′09.5″N 92°49′48.0″W	Conway	
Illinois River Bridge		1922	2005-01-19	Pedro; 36°10′39″N 94°23′31″W	Benton	Pratt through truss
Illinois River Bridge	Illinois River Bridge	1922	1988-01-28	Savoy; 36°9′59″N 94°26′1″W	Washington	
Illinois River Bridge at Phillips Ford		1922	1988-01-28	County Road 848 over the Illinois River; 36°8′6.24″N 94°21′29.12″W	Washington	Closed-spandrel arch
Judsonia Bridge		1924	1990-04-09	Judsonia; 35°16′3″N 91°38′23″W	White	Warren swing through truss
L' Eau Frais Creek Bridge		1916	2025-01-08	Malvern; 34°13′40.8″N 92°48′39.6″W	Hot Spring	Closed-spandrel arch
Lafayette Street Overpass	Lafayette Street Overpass	1938	1995-05-26	Fayetteville; 36°4′6″N 94°9′57″W	Washington	Open masonry
Lake Catherine State Park-Bridge No. 2	Lake Catherine State Park-Bridge No. 2	ca. 1935	1992-05-28	Shorewood Hills; 34°25′46″N 92°56′21″W	Hot Spring	
Lake No. 1 Bridge	Lake Bridge No. 1	1920s	1990-04-09	North Little Rock; 34°47′20″N 92°15′8″W	Pulaski	Closed spandrel deck arch
Lakeshore Drive Bridge	Lakeshore Drive Bridge	1930s	1990-04-09	North Little Rock; 34°47′41″N 92°15′6″W	Pulaski	Closed spandrel deck arch
Ben Laney Bridge		1947	2000-06-09	Camden; 33°35′47″N 92°49′7″W	Ouachita	Pratt pony truss
Lee Creek Bridge	Lee Creek Bridge (Natural Dam)	1934	1990-04-06	Natural Dam; 35°38′46″N 94°23′37″W	Crawford	Pennsylvania through truss
Lee Creek Bridge	Lee Creek Bridge (Van Buren)	1934	2010-01-21	Van Buren; 35°27′58″N 94°23′22″W	Crawford	Multi-span Pratt and Warren truss bridge.
Lincoln Avenue Viaduct	Lincoln Avenue Viaduct	1928	1990-04-09	Little Rock; 34°45′9″N 92°16′59″W	Pulaski	Rainbow arch
Little Bear Creek Bridge		1930	2026-05-22	De Queen; 34°02′12.9″N 94°20′09.2″W	Sevier	Stringer
Little Buffalo River Bridge	Little Buffalo River Bridge	1939	1995-05-26	Parthenon; 35°58′7″N 93°13′37″W	Newton	Open masonry
Little Cossatot River Bridge		1908	1990-04-06	Lockesburg; 33°58′29″N 94°12′18″W	Sevier	Warren pony truss
Little Cypress Creek Bridge	Little Cypress Creek Bridge	1942	1995-05-18 removed 2026-01-16	Postelle; 34°33′27″N 91°1′24″W	Phillips	
Little Missouri River Bridge	Little Missouri River Bridge	1910	1990-04-09	Prescott; 33°54′10″N 93°18′35″W	Clark	Camelback Pratt
Locust Street Overpass		1936	2021-01-12	North Little Rock; 34°45′50.0″N 92°15′41.4″W	Pulaski	Pratt through truss
Main Street Bridge	Main Street Bridge	1922	2002-07-11	New Blaine; 35°17′19″N 93°25′13″W	Logan	Masonry closed spandrel arch
Maple Street Overpass	Maple Street Overpass	1936	1995-05-26	Fayetteville; 36°4′12″N 94°10′0″W	Washington	Open masonry
Marr's Creek Bridge		1934	2008-01-24	Pocahontas; 36°15′35″N 90°58′19″W	Randolph	Spandrel arch
Maumelle River Bridge		1920	2020-01-21	Natural Steps; 34°51′05.0″N 92°28′59.9″W	Pulaski	Pratt through truss
Maxwell Street Bridge		c. 1910	2011-4-8	DeWitt; 34°17′51″N 91°20′15″W	Arkansas	
McNeely Creek Bridge	McNeely Creek Bridge	1923	2004-05-26	Beirne; 33°53′20″N 93°12′34″W	Clark	Warren pony truss
McNeil Overpass		1936	2021-05-13	McNeil; 33°20′53.9″N 93°12′02.9″W	Columbia	Concrete tee-beam
Memphis & Arkansas Bridge	Memphis & Arkansas Bridge	1949	2001-02-16	West Memphis; 35°7′39″N 90°4′32.4″W	Crittenden	Warren truss with verticals
Mickles Bridge		1880	2007-08-16, delisted 2014-05-27	Mickles; 35°4′27″N 93°17′51″W	Yell	Bowstring through truss
Middle Fork of the Little Red River Bridge	Middle Fork of the Little Red River Bridge	1908	2010-01-21	Shirley	Van Buren	
Miller Creek Bridge	Miller Creek Bridge	1914	2010-01-21	Batesville	Independence	
Milltown Bridge	Milltown Bridge	1930s	1990-04-06	Milltown; 35°9′30″N 94°10′26″W	Sebastian	Closed spandrel deck arch
Mountain Fork Bridge	Mountain Fork Bridge		1990-04-09	Mena; 34°31′41″N 94°24′0″W	Polk	Pratt pony truss
Mulberry River Bridge	Mulberry River Bridge	1927, 1957	2007-01-24 delisted 2024-04-30	Pleasant Hill; 35°31′57″N 94°2′27″W	Crawford, Franklin	Pratt through truss
Mulberry River Bridge		1935	2007-01-24	Turner's Bend; 35°40′18″N 93°49′46″W	Franklin	Parker pony truss
Mulladay Hollow Bridge	Mulladay Hollow Bridge		1990-04-06	Eureka Springs; 36°26′6″N 93°45′56″W	Carroll	Closed spandrel deck arch
Newport Bridge	Newport Bridge	1930	1990-04-09	Newport; 35°36′5″N 91°17′16″W	Jackson	Warren cantilever
Nix Creek Bridge		1939	2021-01-04	Texarkana; 33°25′22.4″N 94°01′50.2″W	Miller	Concrete tee-beam
North Fork Bridge	North Fork Bridge	1937	1990-04-09	Norfork; 36°12′44″N 92°17′10″W	Baxter	Warren deck truss; demolished in 2014.
North Fork Saline River Bridge		1944	1995-05-26 delisted September 23, 2011	Paron; 34°46′47″N 92°45′28″W	Saline	Open masonry
North Jackson Street Bridge		c. 1910	2011-4-8	DeWitt; 34°17′51″N 91°20′29″W	Arkansas	Early (c. 1910s) concrete deck bridge.
North Washington Street Bridge		1910, 1942	2014-1-22	DeWitt; 34°18′2″N 91°20′0″W	Arkansas	Early (1910) concrete deck bridge.
North Sylamore Creek Bridge			2010-02-24	Fifty-Six; 35°59′44″N 92°12′46″W	Stone	
Old Benton-Sardis Road Bridge		ca. 1919, ca. 1945	2007-01-24	Bauxite; 34°33′39″N 92°30′11″W	Saline	Concrete deck truss
Old AR 16 Bridge	Old Highway 16 Bridge	1936	2011-5-11	Edgemont vicinity 35°36′9″N 92°11′18″W	Cleburne	
Old River Bridge		1889	1977-09-15	Benton; 34°32′26″N 92°36′25″W	Saline	
Old U.S. 71 Ouachita River Bridges		1929	2025-01-08	Acorn; 34°38′37.9″N 94°11′56.9″W	Polk	Warren truss, Concrete deck
Osage Creek Bridge	Osage Creek Bridge	1911	1988-01-28	Tontitown; 36°14′26″N 94°15′12″W	Benton	Pratt through truss
Petit Jean River Bridge	Petit Jean#3 bridge	1938	1995-05-26	Sugar Grove; 35°5′48″N 93°48′3″W	Logan	Pratt through truss
Petit Jean River Bridge		1930	2010-01-21	Ola vicinity	Yell	
Petit Jean State Park-Concrete Log Bridge	Petit Jean State Park-Concrete Log Bridge	ca. 1935	1992-05-28	Winrock; 35°7′34″N 92°55′29″W	Conway	Rustic
Petit Jean State Park-Culvert No. 1	Petit Jean State Park-Culvert No. 1	ca. 1935	1992-05-28	Winrock; 35°7′5″N 92°55′58″W	Conway	Rustic
Pine Bluff Arsenal Access Road Bridge No. 2280		1942	2019-01-24	White Hall; 34°17′45.0″N 92°05′46.0″W	Jefferson	Concrete deck girder
Point Remove Creek Bridge		1926	2019-09-27	Morrilton; 35°09′47.2″N 92°48′13.7″W	Conway	Pratt through truss
Pyatt Tunnel		1903, 1957	2007-09-19	Pyatt; 36°14′31″N 92°49′17″W	Marion	
Rison Overpass		1936	2021-05-13	Rison; 33°57′20.2″N 92°11′46.3″W	Cleveland	Concrete tee-beam
Rock Island Railroad Overpass		1936	2021-09-17	El Dorado; 33°12′25.9″N 92°39′19.8″W	Union	Concrete tee-beam
Roosevelt Road Bridge			2026-01-16	Little Rock; 34°43′25.5″N 92°15′40.7″W	Pulaski	Concrete arch
Russellville West Overpass		1936	2021-09-17	Russellville; 35°18′10.8″N 93°10′14.2″W	Pope	Concrete tee-beam
Sanitarium Lake Bridges Historic District		1891	2010-01-19	Eureka Springs; 36°22′47″N 93°44′4″W	Carroll	Two stone arch bridges.
Self Creek Bridge		1949	2000-06-09	Daisy; 34°14′11″N 93°45′24″W	Pike	Open spandrel deck arch
Shady Lake CCC Bridge No. 1		1937	2010-10-14	Athens vicinity 34°21′39″N 94°01′24″W	Polk	Stone arch
Shady Lake CCC Bridge No. 2		1937	2010-10-14	Athens vicinity 34°22′04″N 94°01′31″W	Polk	Stone arch
Short Mountain Creek Bridge	Short Mountain Creek Bridge	1928, 1954	2004-09-24	Paris; 35°18′41″N 93°44′37″W	Logan	Parker pony truss
Smith Creek Bridge			2025-05-05	Webb City; 35°24′43.3″N 93°52′44.9″W	Franklin	
South Fork Bridge	South Fork Bridge	1928	1990-04-09	Fountain Lake; 34°36′11″N 92°55′20″W	Garland	Closed spandrel deck arch
South Fourche LaFave River Bridge	South Fourche LaFave River Bridge	1933, 1954	2004-09-24 removed 2025-01-08	Hollis; 34°52′22″N 93°6′38″W	Perry	Parker pony truss
Spring Lake Bridge		1936	1990-06-21	Belleville; 35°9′4″N 93°25′54″W	Yell	Closed spandrel deck arch
Spring River Bridge	Spring River Bridge	1916	2014-01-22	Mammoth Spring; 36°28′38″N 91°31′28″W	Fulton	Concrete deck girder
Springfield Bridge	Springfield Bridge	1891, 1874	1988-07-21	Springfield; 35°15′9″N 92°30′45″W	Faulkner	Tubular bowstring arch
St. Francis River Bridge	St. Francis River Bridge	1934	1990-04-09	Lake City; 35°49′14″N 90°25′58″W	Craighead	I-beam vertical lift; dismantled in 1998, leaving only the vertical lift span
St. Francis River Bridge		1933	1990-04-09	Madison; 35°2′13″N 90°42′37″W	St. Francis	Swing through truss
St. Louis-San Francisco Overpass	St. Louis-San Francisco Overpass	1937	1990-04-09	Imboden; 36°12′24″N 91°10′17″W	Lawrence	Pratt deck truss
Sylamore Creek Bridge	Sylamore Creek Bridge	1945	1999-11-18	Allison; 35°56′9″N 92°7′18″W	Stone	Wire-cable suspension
Twin Bridges Historic District			1994-03-07	Morrow; 35°52′35″N 94°27′12″W	Washington	
U.S. 62 White River Bridge	US 62 White River Bridge	1950, 1958	2008-01-24	Eureka Springs; 36°27′4″N 93°49′24″W	Carroll	Deck truss
US 62 Bridge over Crooked Creek		1948	2000-06-09	Pyatt; 36°14′45″N 92°50′4″W	Marion	Warren truss with verticals
US 63 Black River Bridge		1949	2000-06-09	Black Rock; 36°5′52″N 91°5′32″W	Lawrence	Warren truss
U.S. 64 Horsehead Creek Bridge	US 64 Horsehead Creek Bridge	1933	2014-09-29	Hartman; 35°26′6″N 93°36′22″W	Johnson	
U.S. 65 Expressway Pedestrian Bridge		1971	2021-05-13	Pine Bluff; 34°13′45.7″N 92°00′57.4″W	Jefferson	Steel arch
US 67 Bridge over Little Missouri River	US 67 Bridge over Little Missouri River	1931, 1957	2007-01-24	Prescott; 33°52′48″N 93°18′16″W	Clark	Parker pony truss
Van Buren Overpass		1936	2023-05-18	Van Buren; 35°25′55.6″N 94°21′20.9″W	Crawford	Concrete tee-beam, one girder span
Wallace Bridge	Wallace Bridge	1908	2008-8-1		Perry	Camelback through truss
War Eagle Bridge		1907	1985-11-19	War Eagle; 36°16′2″N 93°56′35″W	Benton	Parker through truss
War Eagle Creek Bridge	War Eagle Creek Bridge	1925, 1958	2008-01-24	Old Alabam; 36°7′24″N 93°41′39″W	Madison	Open spandrel arch
Ward's Crossing Bridge		1905	2008-06-4	Plainview	Yell	Camelback through-truss
Warrens Bridge		1930	1995-05-18	Lambrook; 34°20′9″N 91°0′42″W	Phillips	Timber trestle
Woolsey Bridge (Washington County Road 35 Bridge)	Woolsey Bridge	1925	2000-06-09 removed 2026-01-16	Woolsey; 35°53′1″N 94°9′53″W	Washington	Camelback truss
Waterside Street Bridge	Waterside Street Bridge	ca. 1935	1990-06-14	North Little Rock; 34°46′59″N 92°14′46″W	Pulaski	Closed spandrel masonry deck
West 12th Street Overpass		1936	2025-01-08	Little Rock; 34°44′23.4″N 92°18′13.7″W	Pulaski	Closed-spandrel arch
West 14th Street Overpass		1936	2025-01-08	Little Rock; 34°44′16.6″N 92°18′15.9″W	Pulaski	Steel stringer
West James Street Overpass	West James Street Overpass	1924	1995-05-18	Redfield; 34°26′44″N 92°11′6″W	Jefferson	
White River Bridge	Highway 79 Bridge	1930, 1931	1984-11-01	Clarendon; 34°41′22″N 91°19′1″W	Monroe	Warren truss Demolished November 2019
White River Bridge at Elkins		1921	2008-01-24	Elkins; 36°0′10″N 94°0′14″W	Washington	Closed spandrel arch
Yarbro Overpass		1938	2022-05-10	Yarbro; 35°58′39.4″N 89°54′19.8″W	Mississippi	Concrete tee-beam
Yellville West Overpass		1936	2024-09-10	Yellville; 36°15′11.2″N 92°43′02.6″W	Marion	Concrete tee-beam
Zinc Swinging Bridge-BO0162		1927, 1957	2007-01-24	Zinc; 36°17′5″N 92°54′55″W	Boone	Wire-cable suspension
Achmun Creek Bridge		ca. 1920	removed 1999-08-11	Ola	Yell	Warren pony truss
Augusta Bridge	Augusta Bridge	1930	removed 2002-09-14	Augusta	Woodruff	Warren cantilever
Big Slough Ditch Bridge		1947	removed 2004-09-24	Brighton	Greene	Warren truss
Black River Bridge	Black River Bridge	1934	listed 1990-04-09; removed 2018-01-26	Pocahontas; 36°14′56″N 90°58′2″W	Randolph	Warren swing through truss
Cedar Creek Bridge		1938	removed 2004-09-24	Rudy	Crawford	Pratt through truss
Crawford County Road 32D Bridge		1937	removed 2004-09-24	Natural Dam	Crawford	Steel multi-beam
Cypress Creek Bridge		ca. 1915	removed 2002-01-14	Perry	Perry	Pratt through truss
Eight Mile Creek Bridge		1929	removed 2004-09-24	Paragould	Greene	Pratt pony truss
Galla Creek Bridge		1920	removed 2000-03-31	Pottsville	Pope	Pratt through truss
Jenny Lind Bridge		ca. 1940	removed 2004-09-24	Jenny Lind	Sebastian	Closed spandrel deck arch
Lee Creek Bridge (Cove City, Arkansas)			removed 2004-09-24	Cove City	Crawford	Pennsylvania through truss
Old Rockport Bridge		1900	removed 1999-08-11	Rockport	Hot Spring	
Ouachita River Bridge		1930	removed 1999-08-11	Calion	Union	Parker through truss
Pulaski County Road 67D Bridge		1939	removed 2000-07-20	Jacksonville	Pulaski	Open masonry
Pulaski County Road 71D Bridge		1939	removed 2002-01-14	Jacksonville	Pulaski	Open masonry
Red River Bridge		1931	removed 1999-08-11	Garland City	Miller	Pennsylvania through truss
Saline River Bridge		1928	removed 2002-01-14	Benton	Saline	Open spandrel deck arch
Second Street Bridge		1915	removed 1999-08-11	Little Rock	Pulaski	Rainbow arch
Solgohachia Bridge		1890, 1891	2004-05-26 removed 2012-1-27	Solgohachia; 35°16′17″N 92°42′48″W	Conway	Pratt through truss
Spavinaw Creek Bridge		1909	removed 2000-03-31	Decatur	Benton	Truss leg bedstead pony
Vache Grasse Creek Bridge		1940	removed 2002-01-14	Milltown	Sebastian	Stone masonry closed spandrel
Washington County Road 80F Bridge		1940	removed 2004-05-25	Viney Grove	Washington	Steel pony truss
White River Bridge at DeValls Bluff		1924	removed 2005-06-01	De Valls Bluff	Prairie	Pratt through truss
Winkley Bridge		1912	removed 1999-08-11	Heber Springs	Cleburne	
Wolf Bayou Bridge		1924	removed 2006-05-25	Scott	Pulaski	Warren pony truss
Wyman Bridge		1908	removed 2004-09-24	Fayetteville	Washington	Parker through truss

== See also ==
- List of bridges in Arkansas
- List of bridges documented by the Historic American Engineering Record in Arkansas
