= Cedar Creek Bridge (Rosie, Arkansas) =

- U.S. National Register of Historic Places
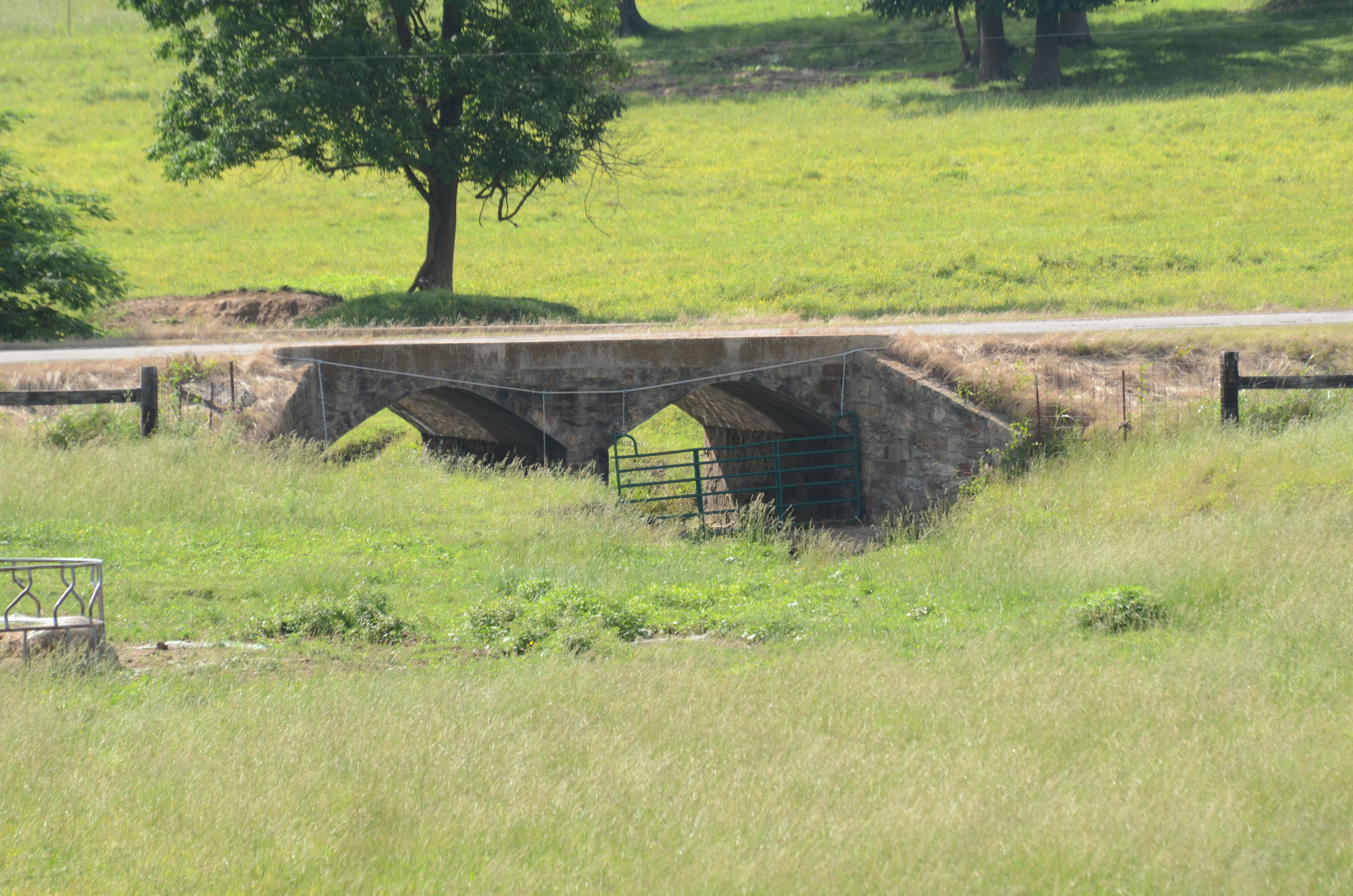

- Location within Arkansas Location within the United States
- Nearest city: Rosie, Arkansas
- Coordinates: 35°38′35″N 91°32′27″W
- Area: less than one acre
- Built: 1941
- Built by: Works Progress Administration
- Architectural style: Closed spandrel deck arch
- MPS: Historic Bridges of Arkansas MPS
- NRHP reference No.: 95000613
- Added to NRHP: May 18, 1995

The Cedar Creek Bridge is a historic bridge in rural southern Independence County, Arkansas. It is located on Goodie Creek Road (County Road 235), about 1.5 miles (2.4 km) south of its junction with Arkansas Highway 14. It is a two-span stone masonry structure, spanning Cedar Creek, a tributary to the White River, with two closed-spandrel arches having a total length of 30 feet (9.1 m). Its deck is 24.1 feet (7.3 m) wide, with a total structure width of 26.1 feet (8.0 m), including the parapets at the sides. The bridge was built 1941, and was probably designed by an engineer of the state's highway department.

The bridge was listed on the National Register of Historic Places in 1995.

== See also ==
- List of bridges documented by the Historic American Engineering Record in Arkansas
- List of bridges on the National Register of Historic Places in Arkansas
- National Register of Historic Places listings in Independence County, Arkansas
