= Miller Bridge =

Miller Bridge may refer to:

- Miller Creek Bridge; Batesville, Arkansas
- Miller Bridge (Winterset, Iowa)
- Longdon L. Miller Covered Bridge; West Finley, Pennsylvania
