= Lake No. 1 Bridge =

- U.S. National Register of Historic Places
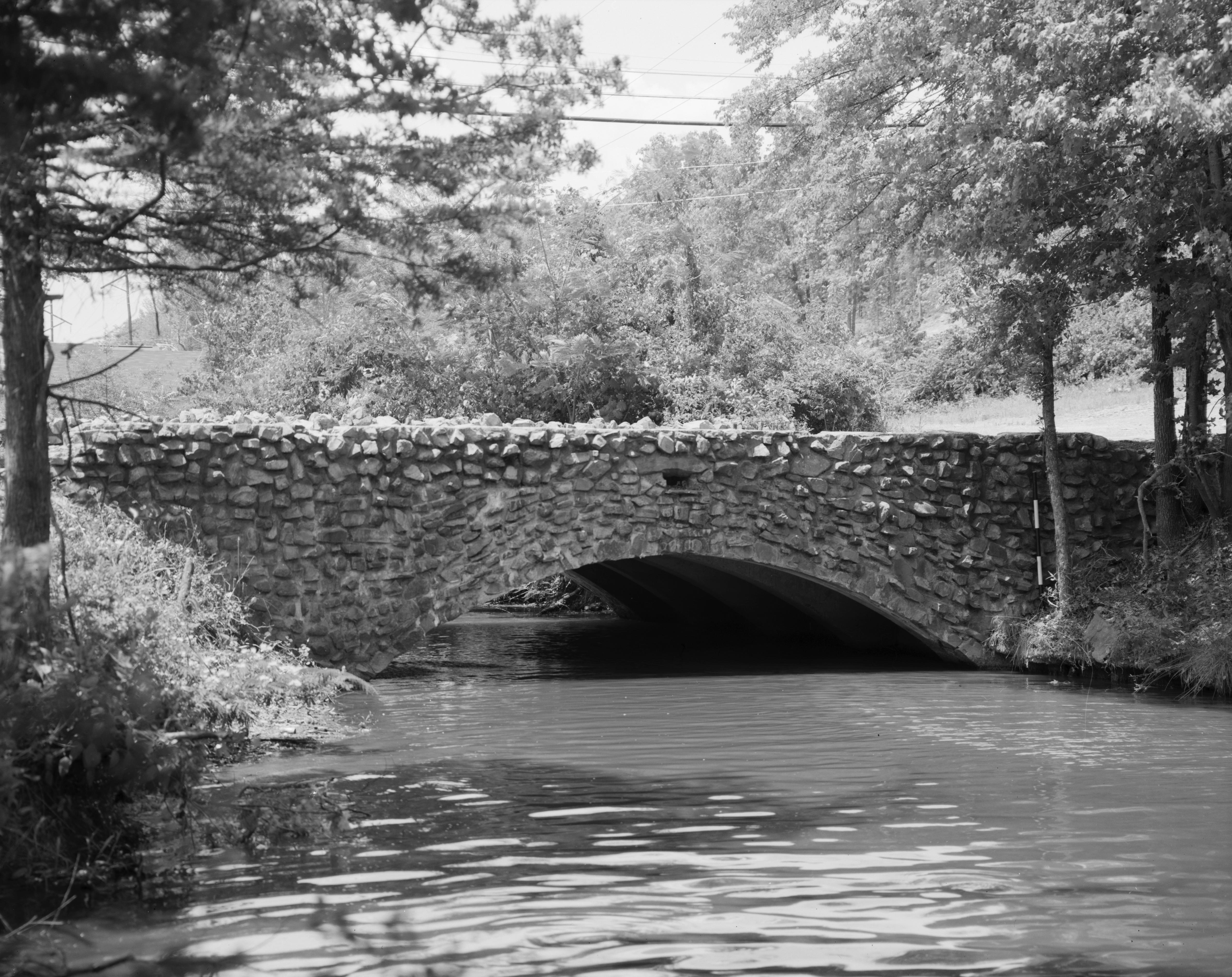
- HAER photo, 1988

- Location within Arkansas Location within the United States
- Location: Avondale Road over Lake No. 1, North Little Rock, Arkansas
- Coordinates: 34°47′20″N 92°15′8″W
- Area: less than one acre
- Architect: Frank Carmean
- Architectural style: Closed-spandrel deck arch
- MPS: Historic Bridges of Arkansas MPS
- NRHP reference No.: 90000534
- Added to NRHP: April 9, 1990

The Lake No. 1 Bridge is a historic bridge carrying Avondale Road across the northern tip of Lake Number 1 in North Little Rock, Arkansas. It is a closed-spandrel stone arch bridge with Rustic styling, built in the 1920s as part of the Lakewood development promoted by developer Justin Mathews. It has a single elliptical arch, spanning 18 feet (5.5 m), with a total structure length of 30 feet (9.1 m). It was one of eight stone arch bridges built in the state between 1923 and 1939, and one of the few that was privately built.

The bridge was listed on the National Register of Historic Places in 1990.

== See also ==
- List of bridges documented by the Historic American Engineering Record in Arkansas
- List of bridges on the National Register of Historic Places in Arkansas
- National Register of Historic Places listings in Pulaski County, Arkansas
