= Sanitarium Lake Bridges Historic District =

Historic district in Arkansas, United States

- U.S. National Register of Historic Places
- U.S. Historic district
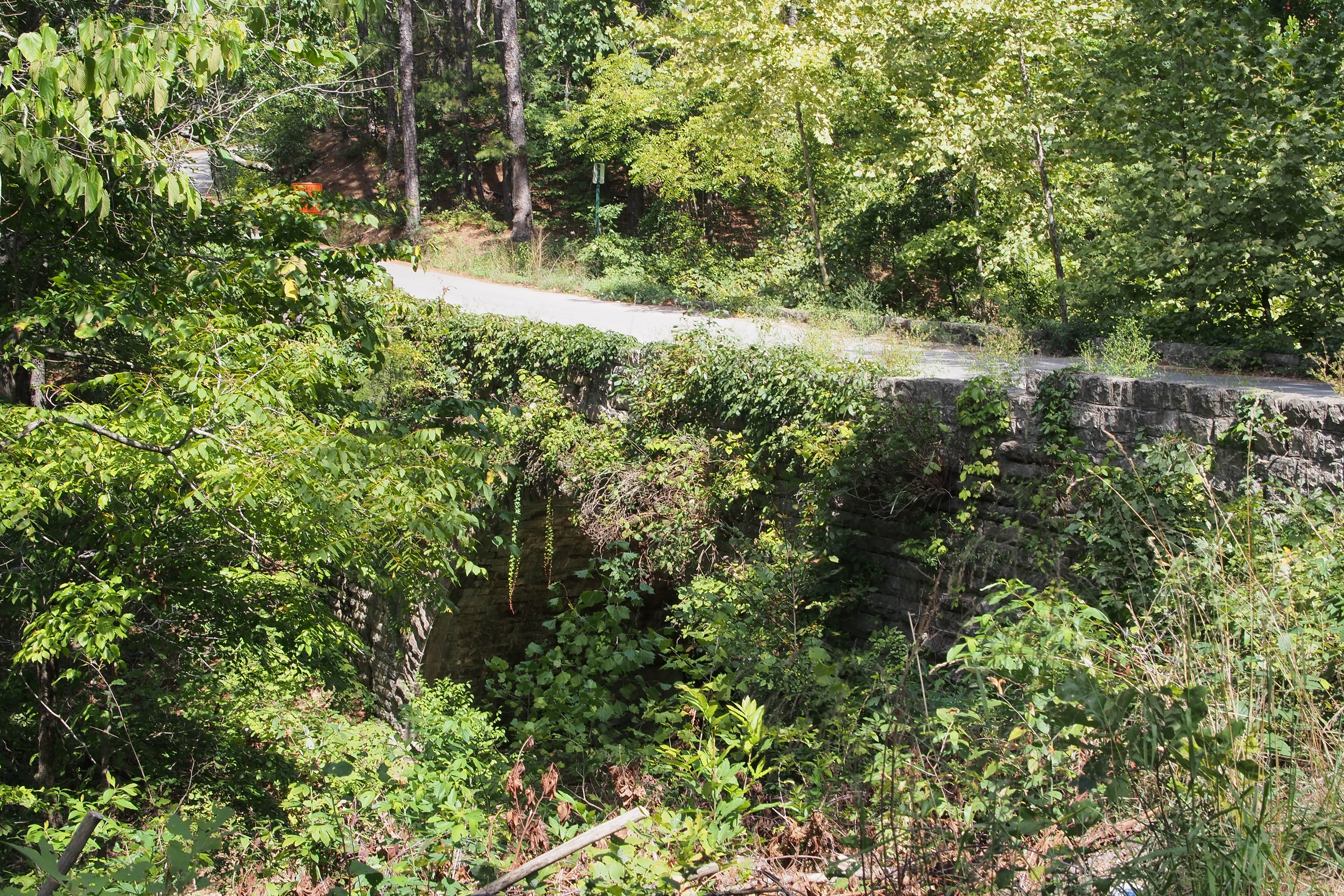
- The Lake Bridge

- Location within Arkansas Location within the United States
- Nearest city: Eureka Springs, Arkansas
- Coordinates: 36°22′47″N 93°44′4″W
- Area: less than one acre
- Built: 1891
- Built by: Eureka Sanitarium Company
- Architectural style: Masonry arch
- MPS: Historic Bridges of Arkansas MPS
- NRHP reference No.: 09001238
- Added to NRHP: January 19, 2010

The Sanitarium Lake Bridges Historic District encompasses a pair of stone arch bridges on Carroll County Road 317 (Lake Lucerne Road) in southern Eureka Springs, Arkansas.

== History ==
Built in 1891 by the Eureka Sanitarium Company to provide access to its resort, they are the only known stone arch bridges in the county, and two of a small number of known surviving stone arch bridges in the entire state. Both bridges are single-span arches fashioned out of cut stone. Marble Bridge, the northern one, has a span of 44 feet (13 m) across a ravine, while the Lake Bridge has a span of 22 feet (6.7 m) over a normally dry creek bed.

The district was listed on the National Register of Historic Places in 2010.

== See also ==
- List of bridges documented by the Historic American Engineering Record in Arkansas
- List of bridges on the National Register of Historic Places in Arkansas
- National Register of Historic Places listings in Carroll County, Arkansas
