= Frog Bayou Bridge =

- U.S. National Register of Historic Places
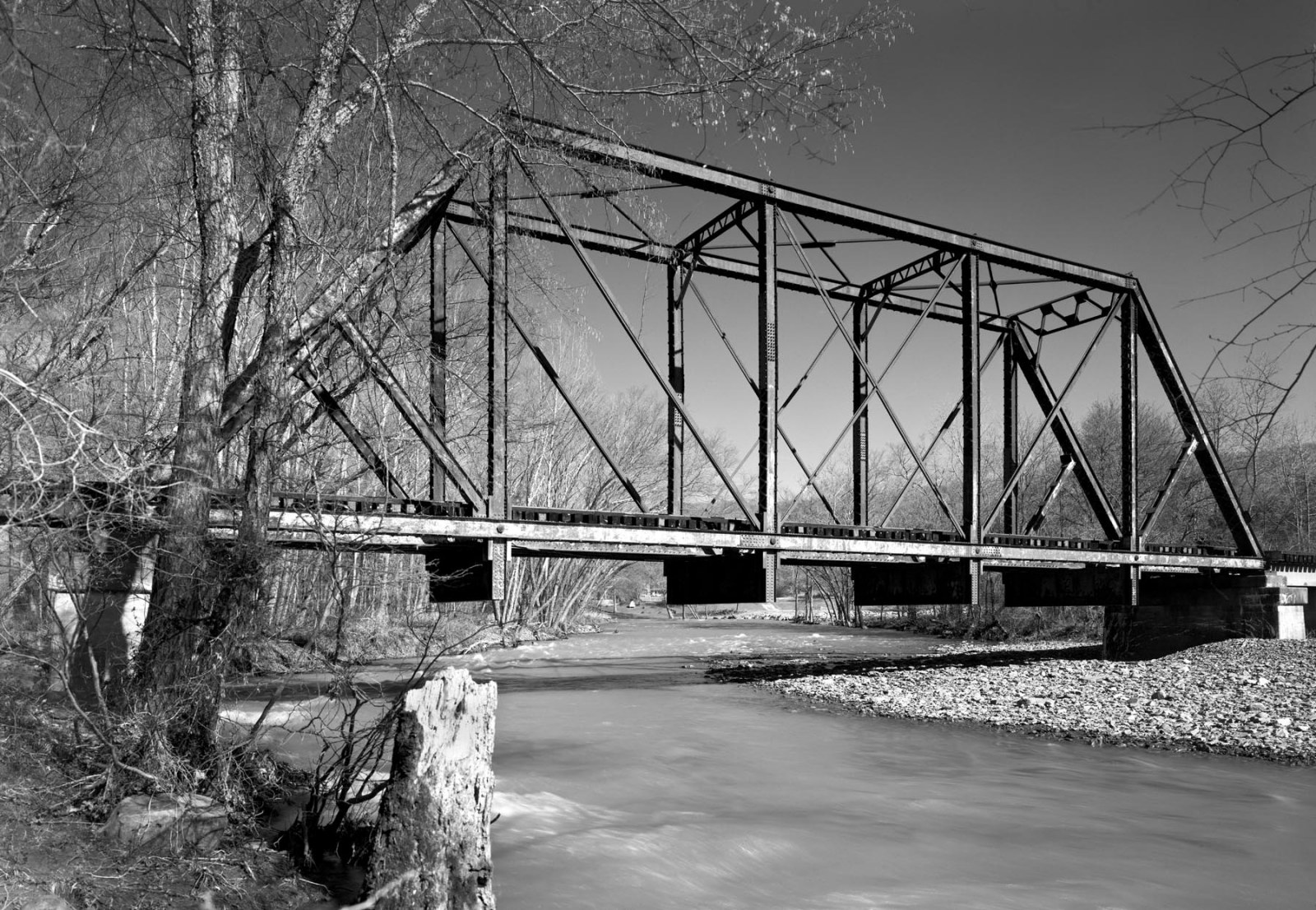

- Location within Arkansas Location within the United States
- Nearest city: Mountainburg, Arkansas
- Coordinates: 35°37′4″N 94°11′3″W
- Area: less than one acre
- Built: 1942
- Architectural style: Parker through truss
- MPS: Historic Bridges of Arkansas MPS
- NRHP reference No.: 95000648
- Added to NRHP: May 26, 1995

The Frog Bayou Bridge is a historic bridge in Crawford County, Arkansas, just south of Mountainburg. It is a single-span steel Parker through truss, which formerly carried Arkansas Highway 282 across Frog Bayou, a tributary of the Arkansas River. The bridge is now closed to traffic, and is located at the southern end of Silver Bridge Road. The bridge has a span of 150 feet (46 m) and a total structure length of 209 feet (64 m), and rests on abutments of stone and concrete. The northern approach to the bridge also includes a stone and concrete pier. The bridge was built in 1942.

The bridge was listed on the National Register of Historic Places in 1995.

== See also ==
- List of bridges documented by the Historic American Engineering Record in Arkansas
- List of bridges on the National Register of Historic Places in Arkansas
- National Register of Historic Places listings in Crawford County, Arkansas
