= Osage Creek Bridge =

- Formerly listed on the U.S. National Register of Historic Places
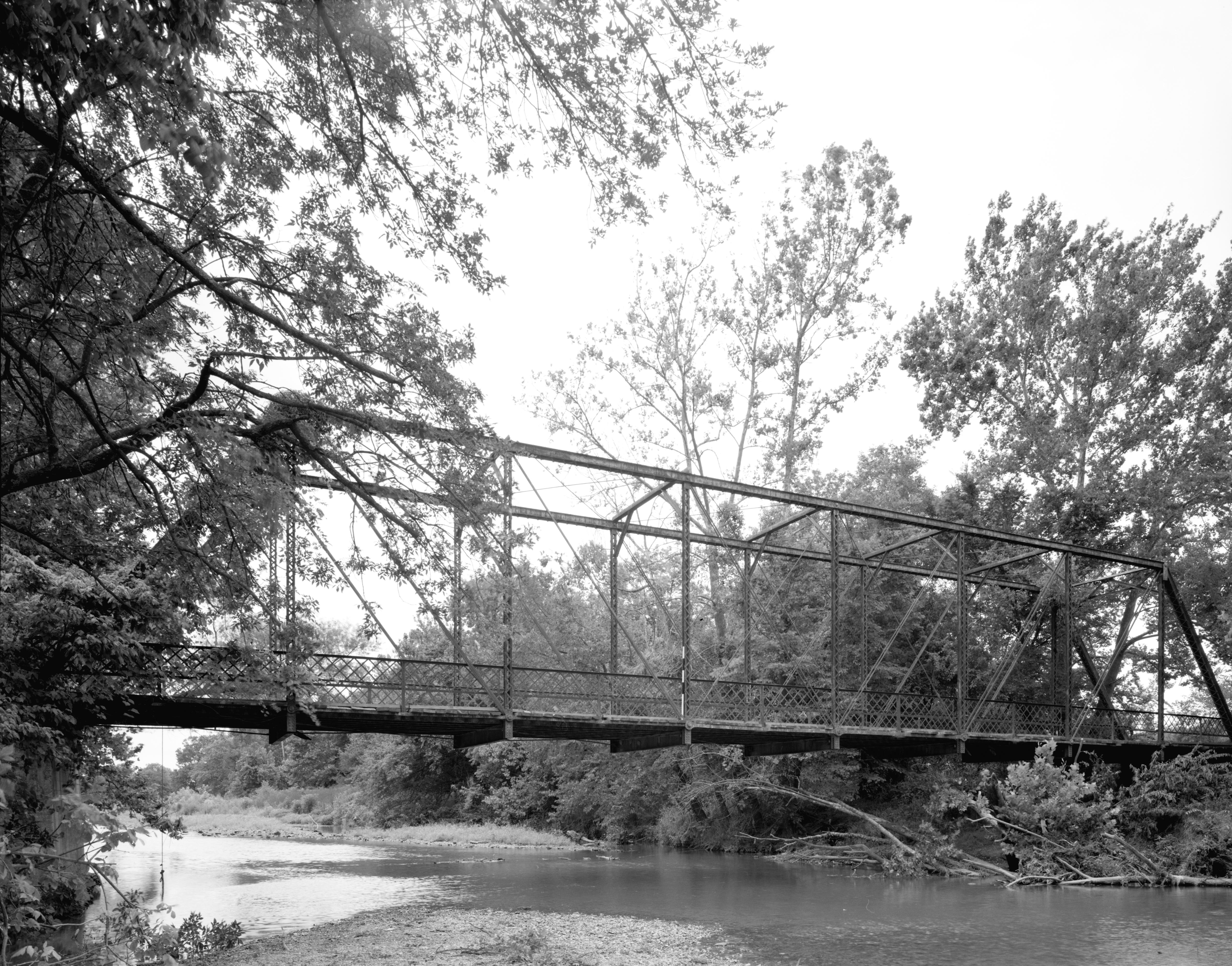
- HAER photo, 1988

- Location within Arkansas Location within the United States
- Location: 4.5 miles (7.2 km) north of Tontitown, Arkansas
- Coordinates: 36°14′26″N 94°15′12″W
- Area: less than one acre
- Built: 1911
- Architectural style: Pratt through truss
- MPS: Benton County MRA
- NRHP reference No.: 87002418

Significant dates
- Added to NRHP: January 28, 1988
- Removed from NRHP: January 3, 2022

The Osage Creek Bridge is a historic bridge in southern Benton County, Arkansas. The bridge formerly carried County Road 71 (Colonel Myers Road) across Osage Creek, about 4.5 miles (7.2 km) north of Tontitown, but it has been closed. It is a single-span iron Pratt through truss structure, with a span of 124 feet (38 m), resting on concrete abutments. It has a lattice guardrail on one side, a feature that rarely survives on bridges of this type. The bridge was built in 1911 by an unknown builder, and is one of about 60 Pratt truss bridges in the state.

The bridge was listed on the National Register of Historic Places in 1988, and was delisted in 2022.

According to Bridgehunter.com, it was moved to facilitate a new bridge over Osage Creek in 2014 and scrapped in 2015.

== See also ==
- List of bridges documented by the Historic American Engineering Record in Arkansas
- List of bridges on the National Register of Historic Places in Arkansas
- National Register of Historic Places listings in Benton County, Arkansas
