= Big Bottom Slough Bridge =

- U.S. National Register of Historic Places
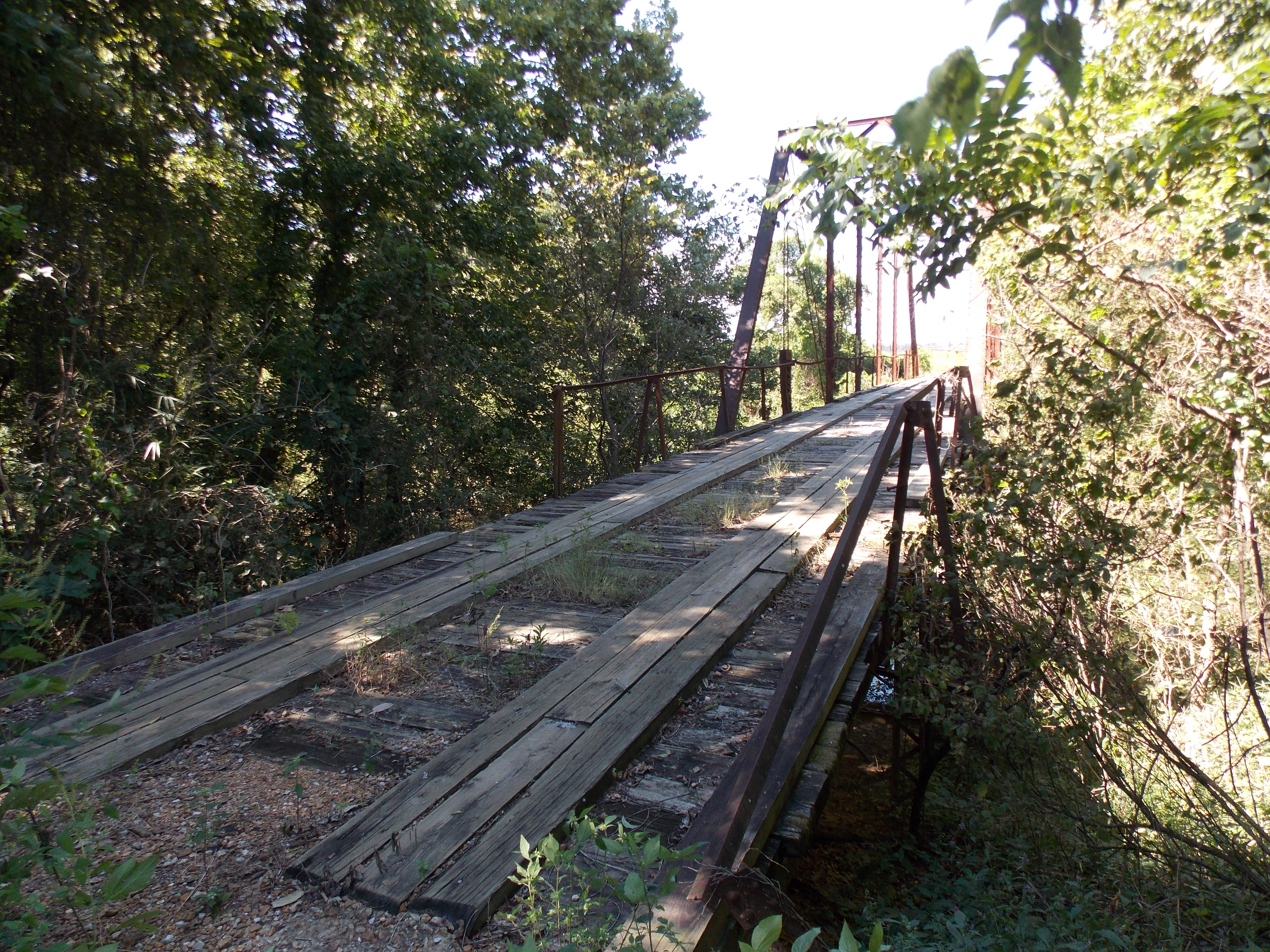

- Location within Arkansas Location within the United States
- Nearest city: Magness, Arkansas
- Coordinates: 35°40′13″N 91°28′38″W
- Area: less than one acre
- Built: 1909
- Architectural style: Pratt through truss
- MPS: Historic Bridges of Arkansas MPS
- NRHP reference No.: 04001042
- Added to NRHP: September 24, 2004

The Big Bottom Slough Bridge is a historic bridge in rural eastern Independence County, Arkansas. Now closed to traffic, it formerly carried Padgett Island Road across Big Bottom Slough about 2.5 miles (4.0 km) south of Magness. It is a pin-connected Pratt through truss structure, with a span of 110 feet (34 m) and a total structure length of 192 feet (59 m). The bridge was built in 1909, and is the only bridge of its type in the area.

The bridge was listed on the National Register of Historic Places in 2004, as "Big Botton Slough Bridge".

== See also ==
- List of bridges documented by the Historic American Engineering Record in Arkansas
- List of bridges on the National Register of Historic Places in Arkansas
- National Register of Historic Places listings in Independence County, Arkansas
