= Lincoln Avenue Viaduct =

- U.S. National Register of Historic Places
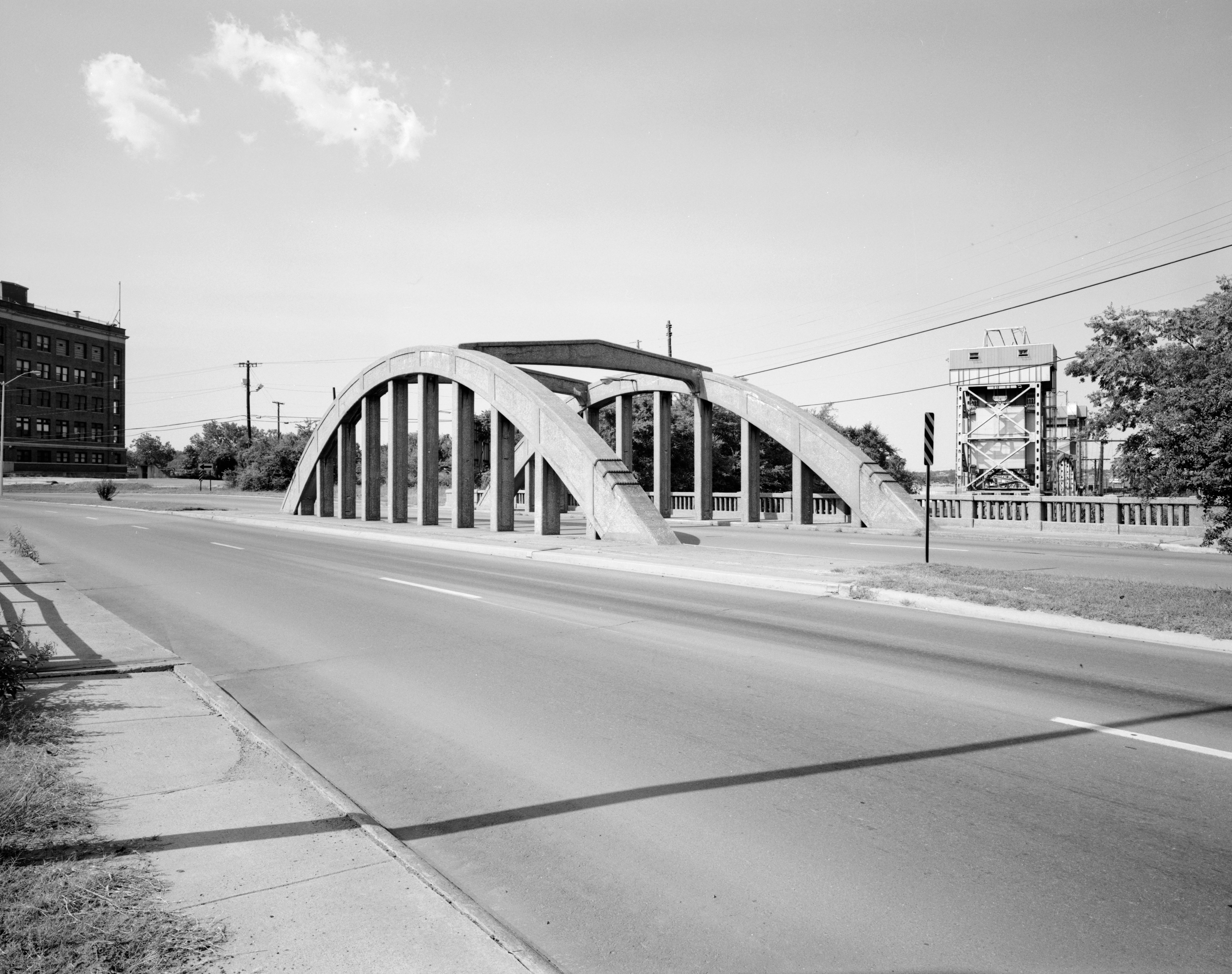
- HAER photo, 1988

- Location within Arkansas Location within the United States
- Location: AR 10 (Cantrell Road) over the Missouri-Pacific Railroad, Little Rock, Arkansas
- Coordinates: 34°45′9″N 92°16′59″W
- Area: less than one acre
- Built: 1928
- Built by: Missouri-Pacific Railroad
- Engineer: Ozark Engineering Co.
- Architectural style: Tied arch
- MPS: Historic Bridges of Arkansas MPS
- NRHP reference No.: 90000731
- Added to NRHP: April 9, 1990

The Lincoln Avenue Viaduct, also known as the Cantrell Road Bridge, is a historic bridge, now carrying the westbound lanes of Cantrell Road (Arkansas Highway 10) across railroad tracks in downtown Little Rock, Arkansas, United States. The bridge is a rainbow arch structure built out of reinforced concrete, with an arch length of 90 feet (27 m), and a total structure length of 144 feet (44 m). The bridge was built in 1928 by the Missouri-Pacific Railroad and given to the city; it is the only bridge of its type in the state.

The bridge was listed on the National Register of Historic Places in 1990.

== See also ==
- List of bridges documented by the Historic American Engineering Record in Arkansas
- List of bridges on the National Register of Historic Places in Arkansas
- National Register of Historic Places listings in Little Rock, Arkansas
