= Rennic Road Bridge =

- U.S. National Register of Historic Places
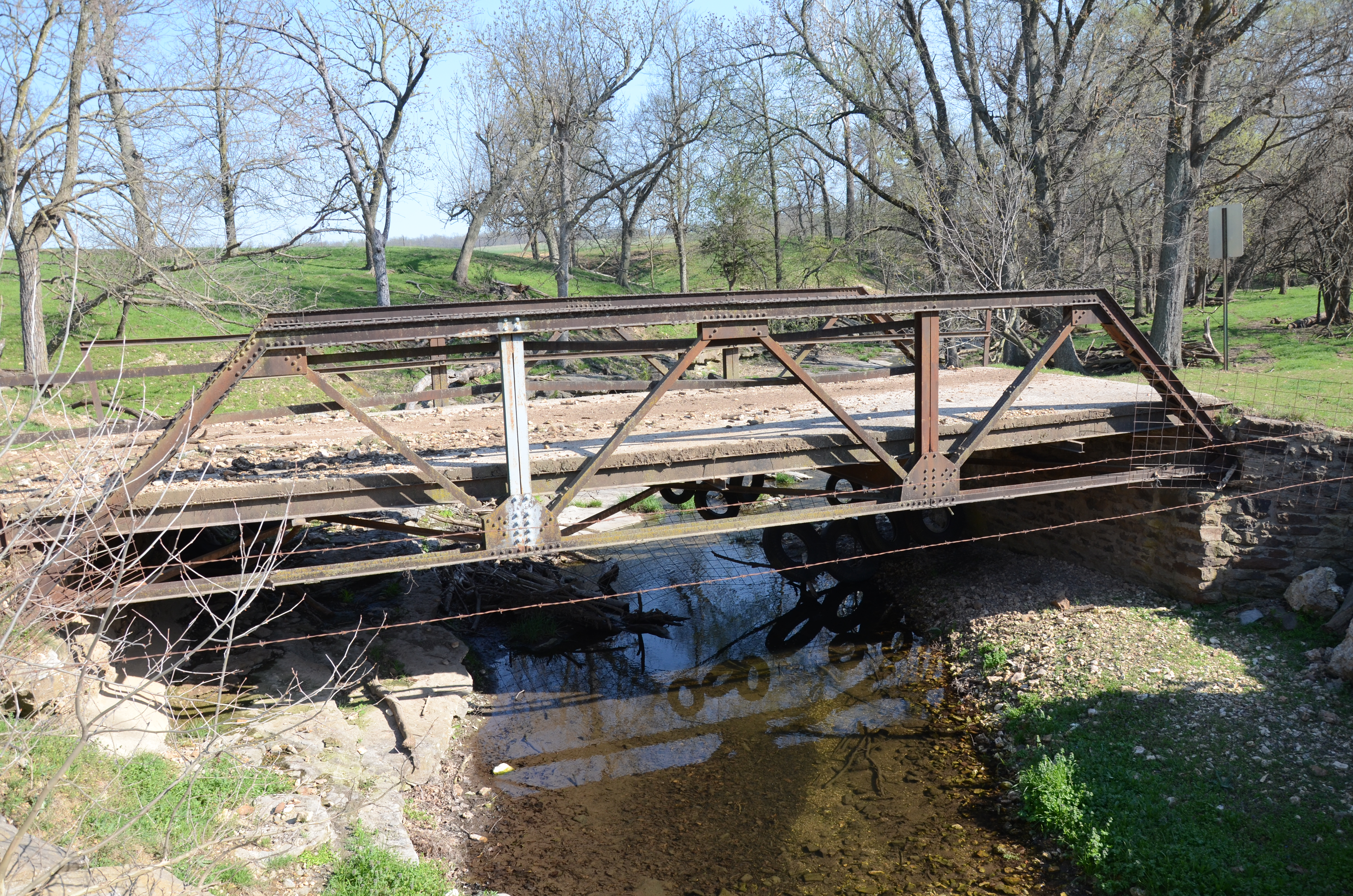

- Location within Arkansas Location within the United States
- Nearest city: Cincinnati, Arkansas
- Coordinates: 36°04′15″N 94°28′30″W
- Area: Washington County
- Built: 1915
- Architectural style: Warren pony truss
- MPS: Historic Bridges of Arkansas
- NRHP reference No.: 04001043
- AHTD No.: 17295
- Added to NRHP: September 24, 2004

The Rennic Road Bridge is a single-span Warren truss bridge in Washington County, Arkansas. It historically carried Rennic Road (County Road 6) across an unnamed creek in a rural part of the county about 2 miles (3.2 km) northeast of the hamlet of Cincinnati, Arkansas, but has recently been bypassed, and stands next to the modern bridge. The bridge has a span of 37 feet (11 m) and a total length of 41 feet (12 m). It was built c. 1915, probably replacing a bridge built around the time the road was laid out c. 1880. The steel for the trusses came from the Cambria Steel Company of Johnstown, Pennsylvania; the builder is not known.

The bridge was listed on the National Register of Historic Places in 2004 as the County Road 6 Bridge.

== See also ==
- National Register of Historic Places listings in Washington County, Arkansas
- List of bridges on the National Register of Historic Places in Arkansas
