= Waterside Street Bridge =

- U.S. National Register of Historic Places
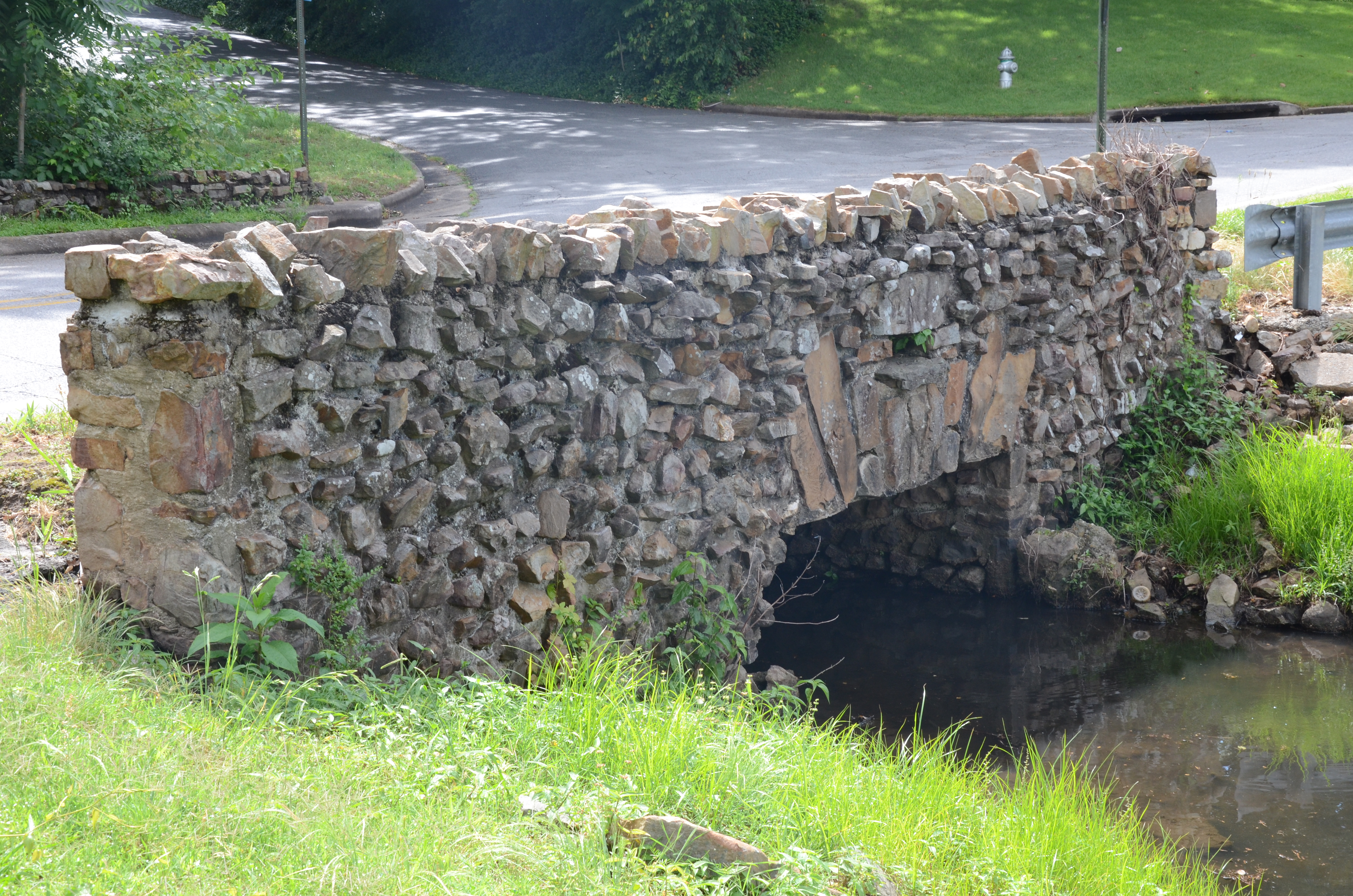

- Location within Arkansas Location within the United States
- Location: Waterside Street near junction with East 31st Street, North Little Rock, Arkansas
- Coordinates: 34°46′59″N 92°14′46″W
- Area: less than one acre
- Built: 1935
- Architect: Frank Carmean
- Architectural style: Closed-spandrel masonry deck
- MPS: Historic Bridges of Arkansas MPS
- NRHP reference No.: 90000888
- Added to NRHP: June 14, 1990

The Waterside Street Bridge is a historic bridge, carrying Waterside Street across an inlet of Lake Number 1 in North Little Rock, Arkansas. It is a rustic closed-spandrel masonry structure, with an exterior of rough uncoursed fieldstone that rises to parapet above the side of the roadbed. It is one of four masonry bridges built between 1929 and 1939 by developer Justin Matthews as part of the Lakewood subdivision.

The bridge was listed on the National Register of Historic Places in 1990.

== See also ==
- List of bridges documented by the Historic American Engineering Record in Arkansas
- List of bridges on the National Register of Historic Places in Arkansas
- National Register of Historic Places listings in Pulaski County, Arkansas
