= Pine Bluff Arsenal Access Road Bridge No. 2280 =

- U.S. National Register of Historic Places
- Location within Arkansas Location within the United States
- Location: AR 256 over Caney Creek, White Hall, Arkansas
- Coordinates: 34°17′45″N 92°5′46″W
- Area: less than one acre
- Built: 1942
- Architectural style: Concrete deck girder
- NRHP reference No.: 100003330
- Added to NRHP: January 24, 2019

The Pine Bluff Arsenal Access Road Bridge No. 2280 is a historic bridge near White Hall, Arkansas. It carries East Hoadley Road (Arkansas Highway 256) over Caney Creek, between the town and the Pine Bluff Arsenal. It is a concrete girder structure, with a total length of 152 feet (46 m). It consists of a concrete deck supported by abutments and four cast concrete piers, carrying a roadway 28 feet (8.5 m) in width. It was built in 1942 with funds authorized by the National Defense Highway Act of 1941, in order to facilitate access between the arsenal (founded in 1941) and existing transportation networks.

The bridge was listed on the National Register of Historic Places in 2019.

== See also ==
- List of bridges on the National Register of Historic Places in Arkansas
- National Register of Historic Places listings in Jefferson County, Arkansas
