= Mulladay Hollow Bridge =

- U.S. National Register of Historic Places
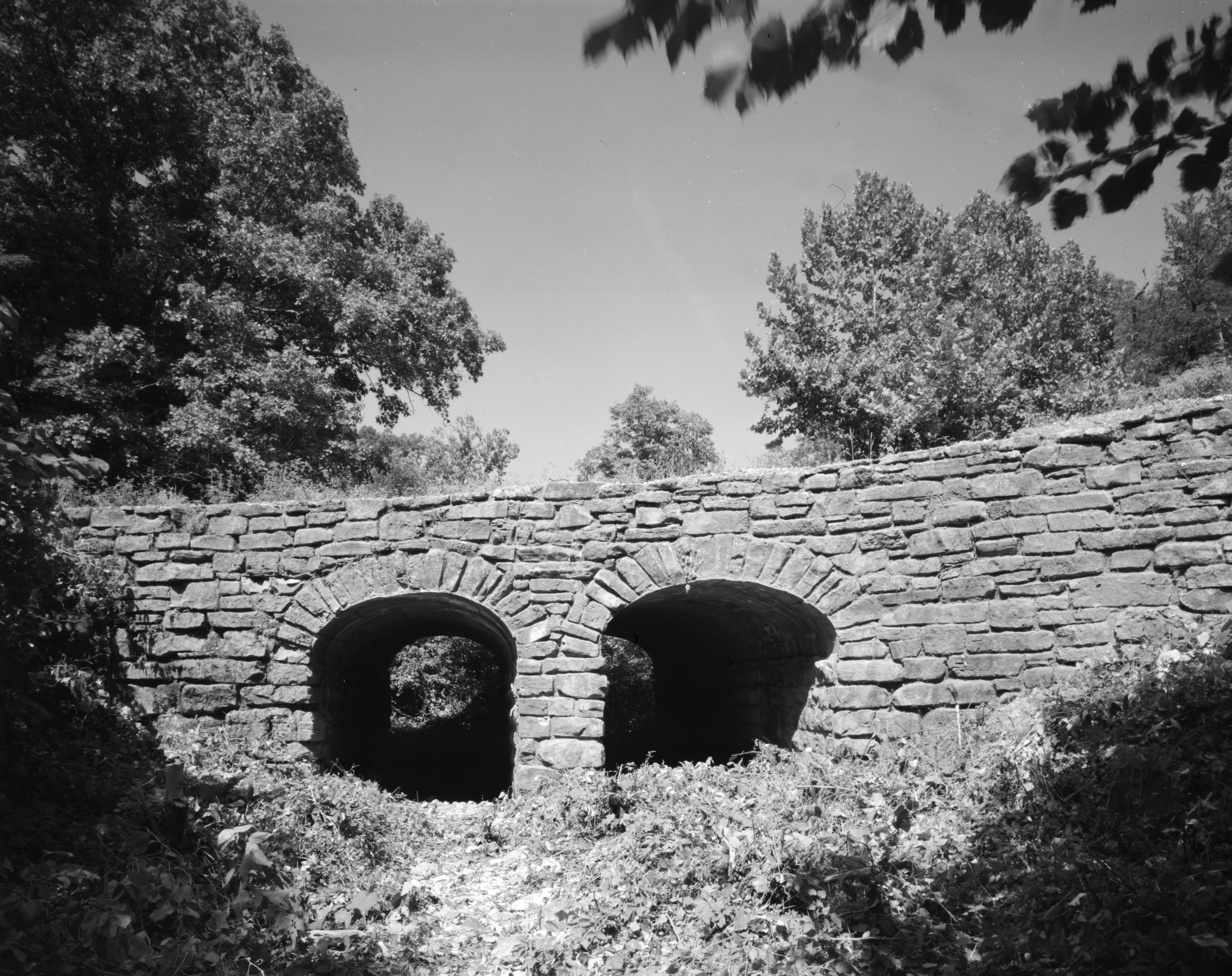

- Location within Arkansas Location within the United States
- Nearest city: Eureka Springs, Arkansas
- Coordinates: 36°26′6″N 93°45′56″W
- Area: less than one acre
- Built by: Works Progress Administration
- Architect: Works Progress Administration
- Architectural style: Closed spandrel, deck arch
- MPS: Historic Bridges of Arkansas MPS
- NRHP reference No.: 90000531
- Added to NRHP: April 6, 1990

The Mulladay Hollow Bridge is a stone arch bridge in rural Carroll County, Arkansas. It carries County Road 204 across Mulladay Hollow Creek, near the southwestern tip of Lake Leatherwood It has two spans, and is built out of roughly square and semi-coursed fieldstone. The arches are elliptical in shape, 9 feet (2.7 m) in height and 9.5 feet (2.9 m) wide, with nearly-square voussoirs forming the arches. The barrels of the arches are skewed with respect to the spandrels, and the wing walls are slightly curved. The roadway carried by the bridge is 30 feet (9.1 m) wide, and the total length of the structure is 120 feet (37 m). The bridge was built with Works Progress Administration funding as part of the development of Lake Leatherwood as a recreation area.

The bridge was listed on the National Register of Historic Places in 1990.

== See also ==
- List of bridges documented by the Historic American Engineering Record in Arkansas
- List of bridges on the National Register of Historic Places in Arkansas
- National Register of Historic Places listings in Carroll County, Arkansas
