= Lafayette Street Overpass =

- U.S. National Register of Historic Places
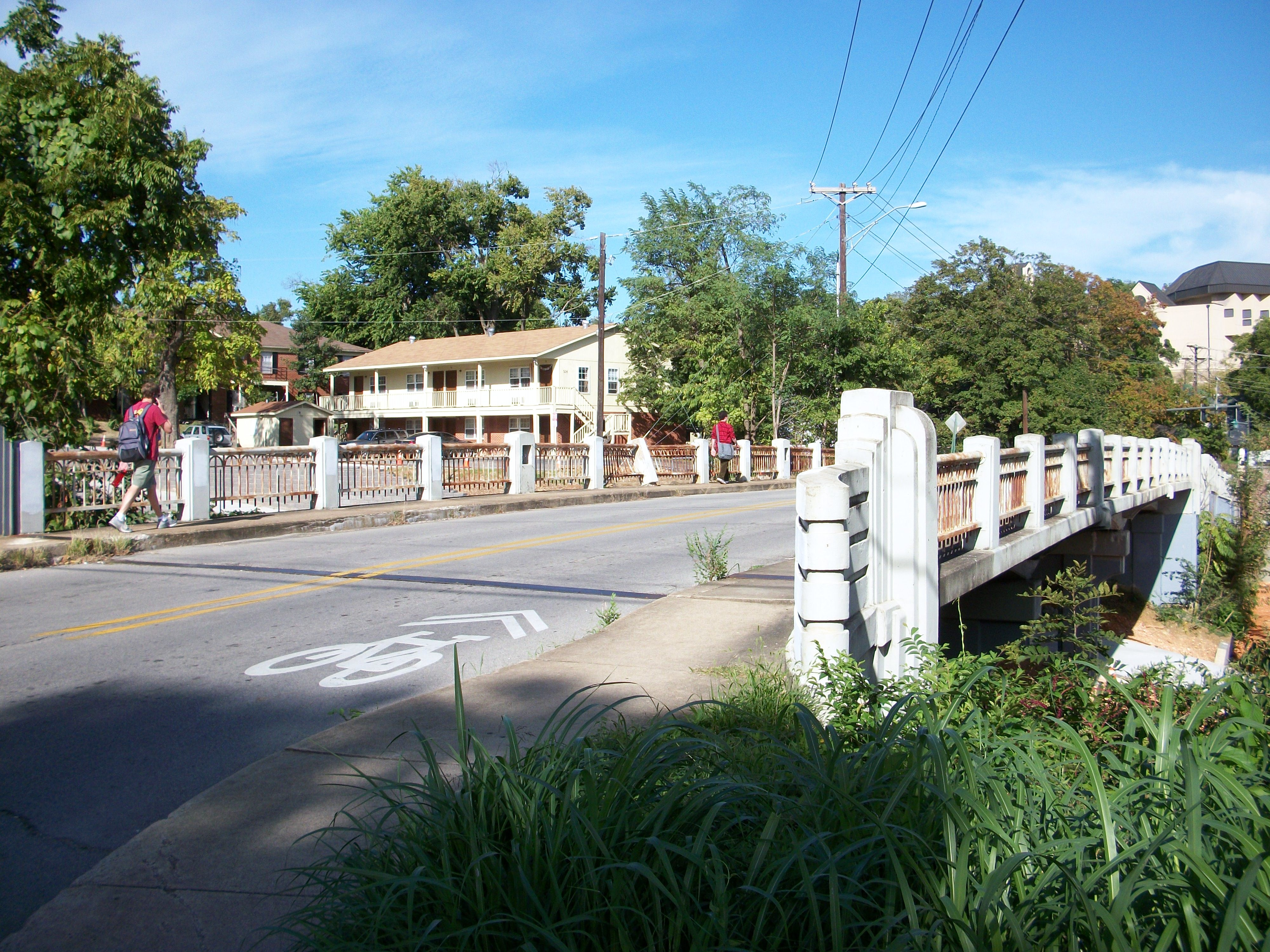

- Location within Arkansas Location within the United States
- Location: Lafayette Street over former St. Louis–San Francisco Railway, Fayetteville, Arkansas
- Coordinates: 36°4′7″N 94°9′59″W
- Area: less than one acre
- Built: 1938
- Built by: Edward B. Mooney, Inc.
- Architectural style: Reinforced concrete girder
- MPS: Historic Bridges of Arkansas MPS
- NRHP reference No.: 95000653
- Added to NRHP: May 26, 1995

The Lafayette Street Overpass is a historic bridge in Fayetteville, Arkansas. It is a three-span reinforced concrete girder structure, carrying Lafayette Street over the tracks of the St. Louis–San Francisco Railway. The bridge is about 120 feet (37 m) long and 30 feet (9.1 m) wide, and consists of reinforced concrete spans resting on concrete abutments. It features an Art Deco railing, with a metal balustrade covering concrete piers with inset light fixtures. The bridge was built in 1938 by Edward B. Mooney, Inc.

The bridge was listed on the National Register of Historic Places in 1995.

== See also ==
- List of bridges documented by the Historic American Engineering Record in Arkansas
- List of bridges on the National Register of Historic Places in Arkansas
- National Register of Historic Places listings in Washington County, Arkansas
