= Little Buffalo River Bridge =

- U.S. National Register of Historic Places
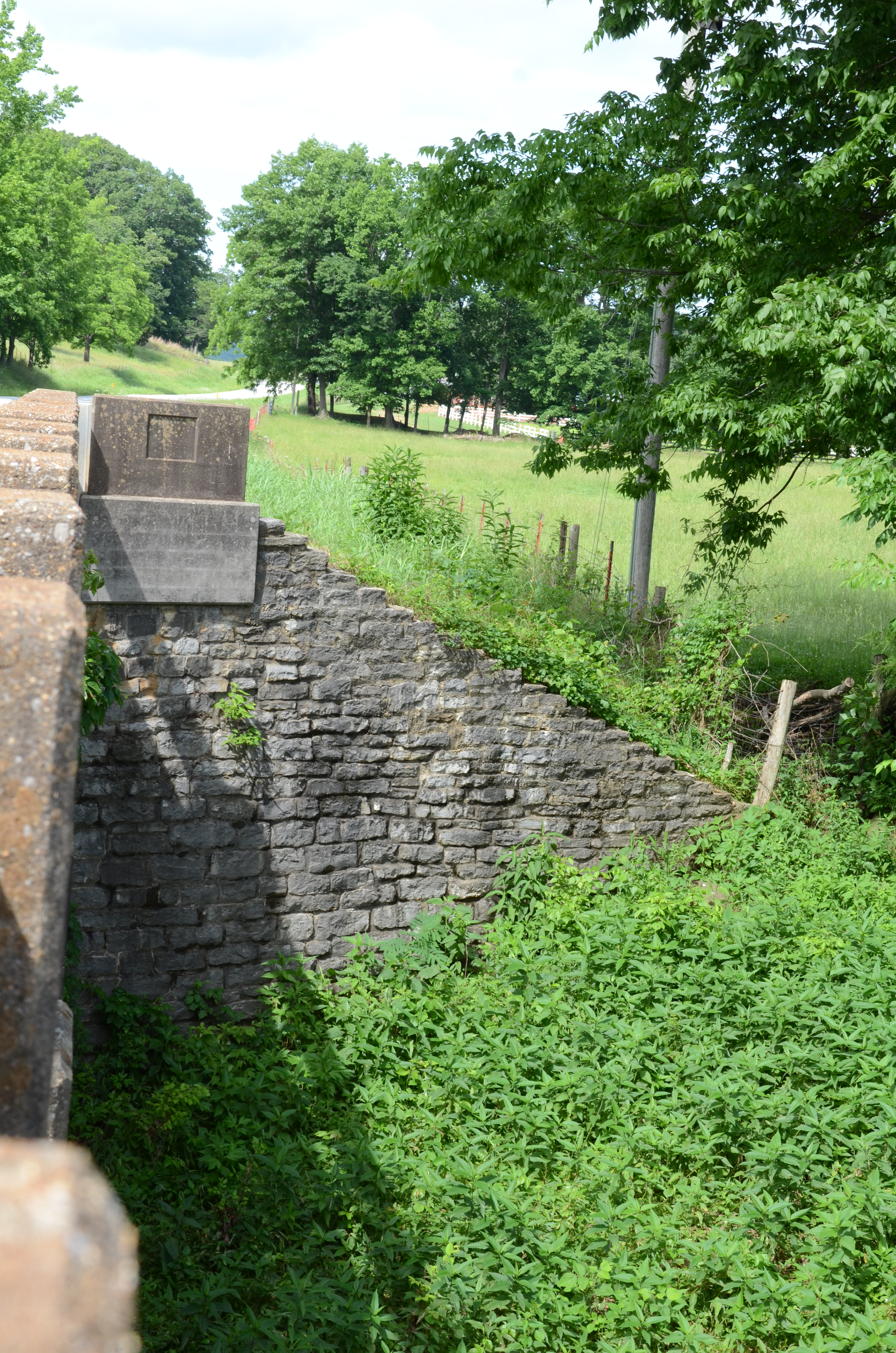

- Location within Arkansas Location within the United States
- Nearest city: AR 327, Parthenon, Arkansas
- Coordinates: 35°58′7″N 93°13′37″W
- Area: less than one acre
- Built: 1939
- Built by: Works Progress Administration
- Architectural style: Reinforced concrete T-beam
- MPS: Historic Bridges of Arkansas MPS
- NRHP reference No.: 95000647
- Added to NRHP: May 26, 1995

The Little Buffalo River Bridge is a historic bridge in central Newton County, Arkansas. The bridge carries Arkansas Highway 327 across the Little Buffalo River between Parthenon and Jasper. It is a seven-span reinforced concrete T-beam structure, with a total length of 212 feet (65 m) and a longest single span of 30 feet (9.1 m). It has a curb width of 19.1 feet (5.8 m), and an overall width of 22.3 feet (6.8 m), including the concrete balustrades on each side. It was built in 1939.

The bridge was listed on the National Register of Historic Places in 1995.

== See also ==
- List of bridges documented by the Historic American Engineering Record in Arkansas
- List of bridges on the National Register of Historic Places in Arkansas
- National Register of Historic Places listings in Newton County, Arkansas
