= Springfield Bridge =

- U.S. National Register of Historic Places
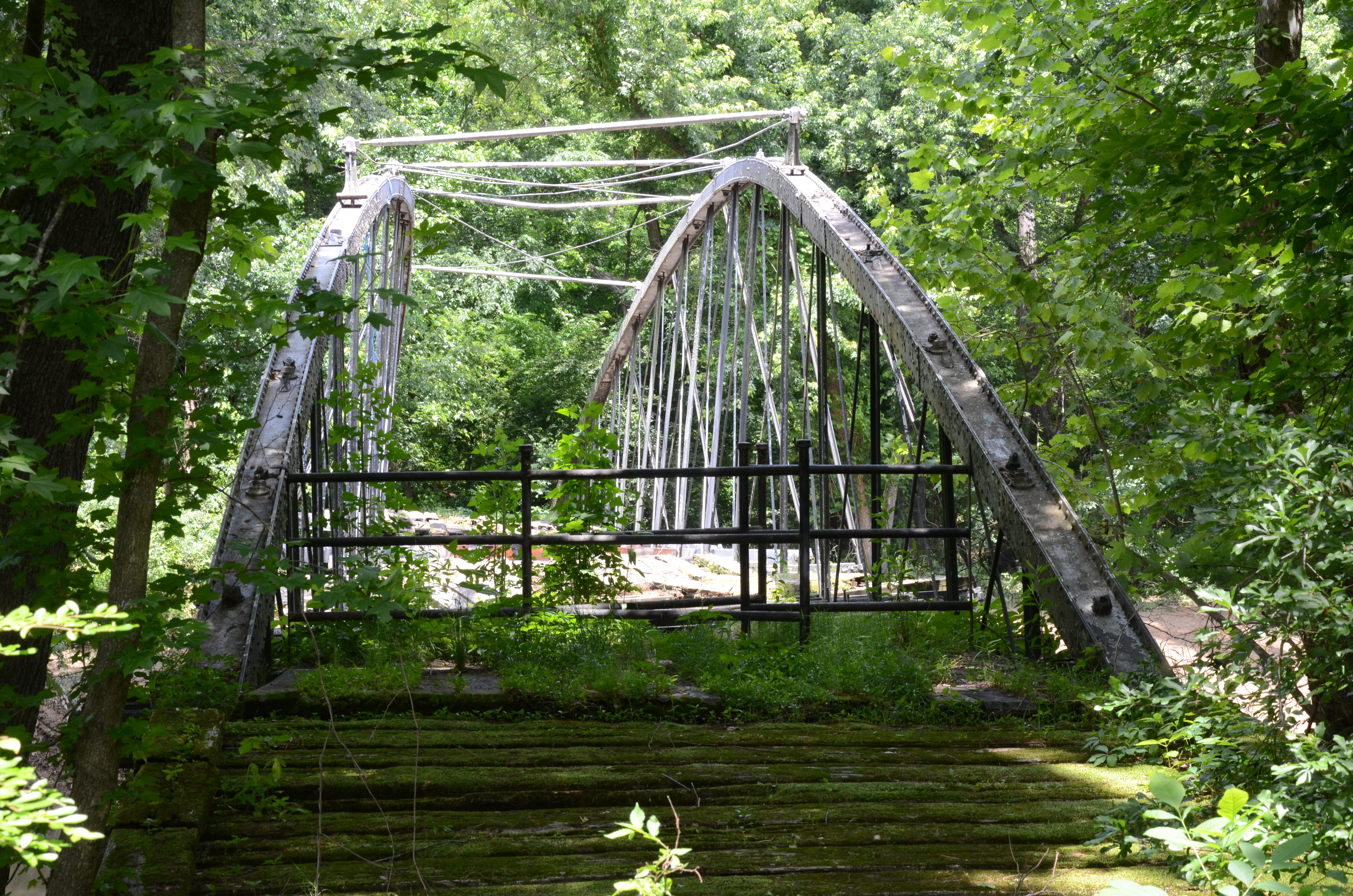
- The bridge prior to its 2017 move

- Location within Arkansas Location within the United States
- Location: Beaverfork Lake Park, Conway, Arkansas
- Coordinates: 35°8′30″N 92°27′13″W
- Area: less than one acre
- Built: 1871
- Built by: Zenas King; King Iron Bridge & Manufacturing Company
- Architectural style: Tubular bowstring truss
- NRHP reference No.: 88000660
- Added to NRHP: July 21, 1988

The Springfield Bridge is a historic bowstring truss bridge, located in Beaverfork Lake Park in Conway, Arkansas, USA. It originally spanned Cadron Creek in rural Faulkner County east of Springfield. It is 188 feet (57 m) long, set on stone abutments, with tubular metal top chords that rise 15 feet (4.6 m) above the bottom chords. Built circa 1871–74, it is the oldest documented highway bridge in the state and its only documented bowstring arch bridge.

The bridge was listed on the National Register of Historic Places in 1988. In 2015, the Faulkner County Historical Society began a drive to relocate the bridge as part of a local trail network. The bridge has suffered from neglect due to its remote location as well as damage by fire and vandalism. The bridge was moved to its present location in 2017.

== See also ==
- List of bridges documented by the Historic American Engineering Record in Arkansas
- List of bridges on the National Register of Historic Places in Arkansas
- National Register of Historic Places listings in Faulkner County, Arkansas
