= Haggard Ford Swinging Bridge =

- U.S. National Register of Historic Places
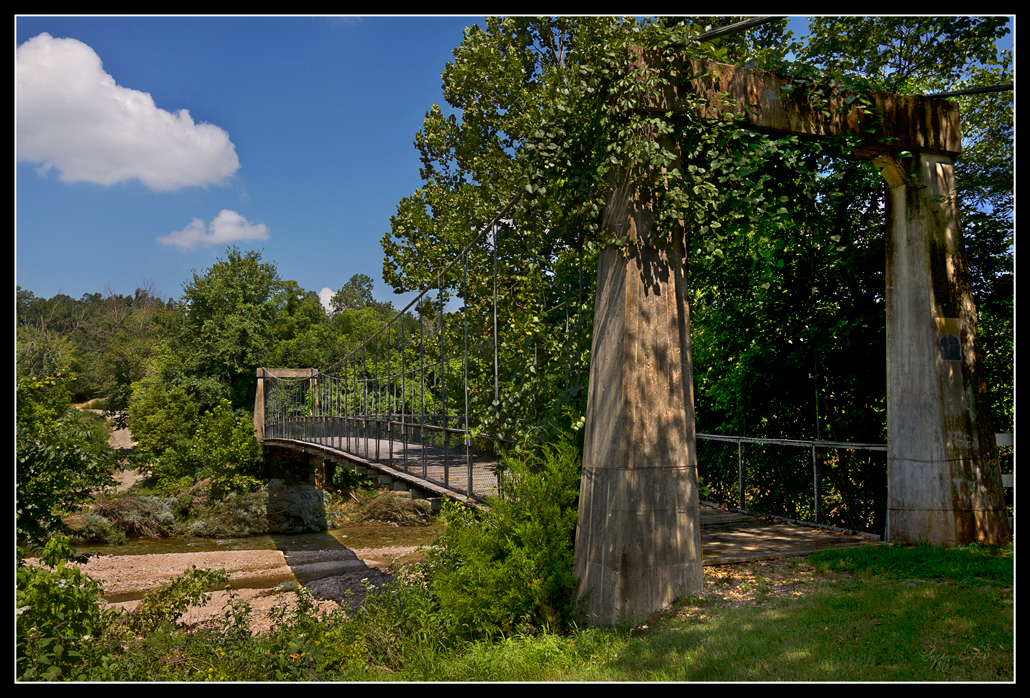

- Location within Arkansas Location within the United States
- Nearest city: Harrison, Arkansas
- Coordinates: 36°20′44″N 93°7′52″W
- Area: less than one acre
- Built: 1938–1941
- Built by: Works Progress Administration
- Architectural style: Suspension Bridge
- MPS: Historic Bridges of Arkansas MPS
- NRHP reference No.: 95000790
- Added to NRHP: June 30, 1995

The Haggard Ford Swinging Bridge is a historic suspension bridge in Boone County, Arkansas. It is located adjacent to Cottonwood Road (which it once carried), about 8 miles (13 km) north of Harrison, and spans Bear Creek. It has cast-in-place concrete abutments, towers, and anchorages, and is supported by steel cables. A wooden deck, one travel lane in width, is suspended from steel hangers. The bridge is about 160 feet (49 m) long. The bridge was built 1938–41 with funding from the Works Progress Administration. Fill surrounding the abutments was washed away in 1945 and subsequently replaced. The bridge deck was replaced in 1977.

The bridge was listed on the National Register of Historic Places in 1995. It is one of the few surviving historic suspension bridges in the state.

== See also ==
- List of bridges documented by the Historic American Engineering Record in Arkansas
- List of bridges on the National Register of Historic Places in Arkansas
- National Register of Historic Places listings in Boone County, Arkansas
