= Mountain Fork Bridge =

- U.S. National Register of Historic Places
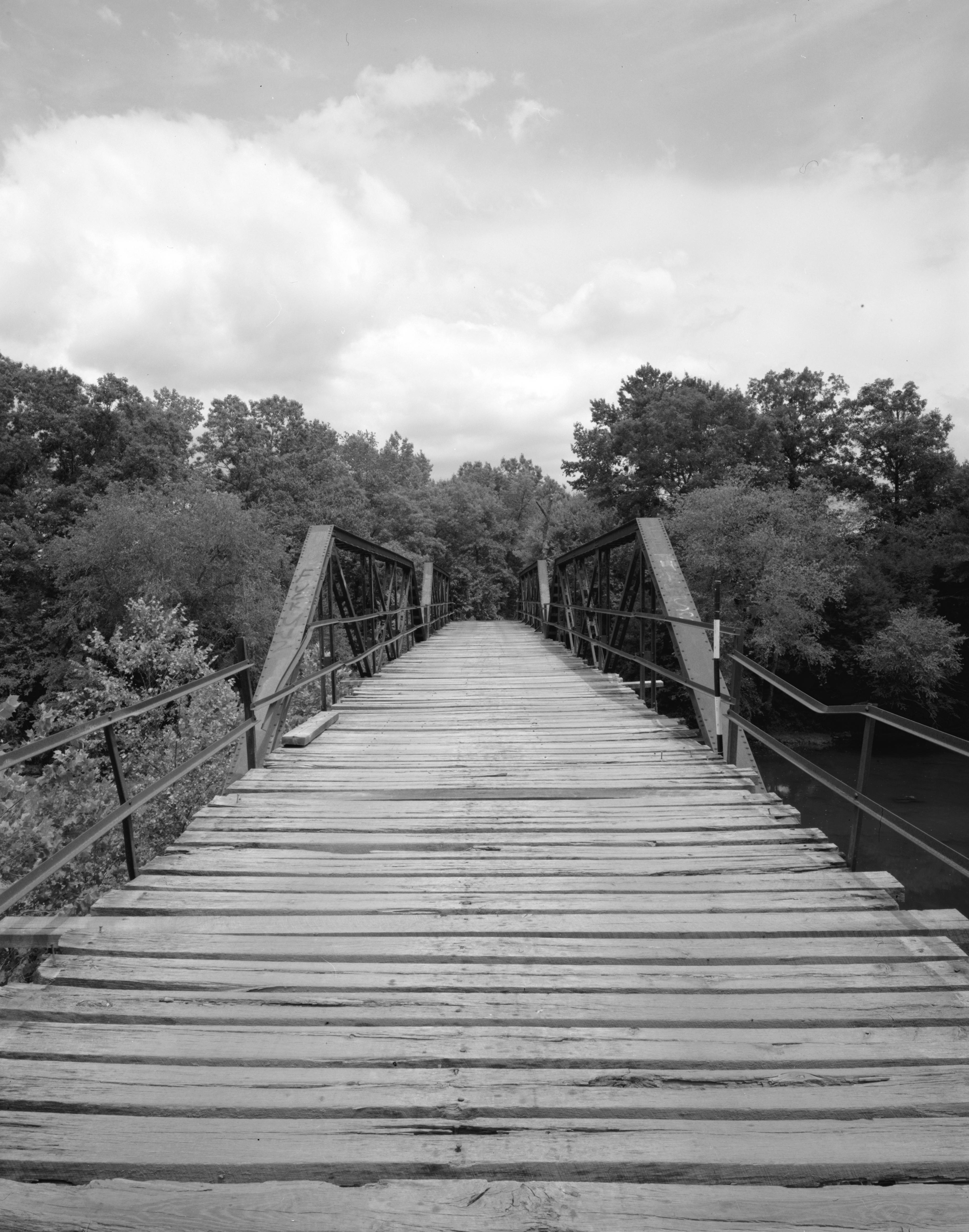

- Location within Arkansas Location within the United States
- Nearest city: Hatfield, Arkansas
- Coordinates: 34°31′41″N 94°24′0″W
- Area: less than one acre
- Architectural style: Pratt pony truss
- MPS: Historic Bridges of Arkansas MPS
- NRHP reference No.: 90000540
- Added to NRHP: April 9, 1990

The Mountain Fork Bridge is a historic bridge in rural Polk County, Arkansas. It carries County Road 38 across Mountain Fork River north of Hatfield and southwest of Mena. The bridge consists of two spans of steel Pratt pony trusses, with a total length of 406 feet (124 m), including approach spans. The trusses are set on piers consisting of steel rings filled with concrete; each of these spans is 80 feet (24 m) long. The bridge's construction date and builder are unknown; it predates the standardization of bridge designs in the state in 1923. It is estimated to date to the early 1900s.

The bridge was listed on the National Register of Historic Places in 1990.

== Design ==
The Mountain Fork Bridge is an example of a pony Pratt steel truss bridge.

== See also ==
- List of bridges documented by the Historic American Engineering Record in Arkansas
- List of bridges on the National Register of Historic Places in Arkansas
- National Register of Historic Places listings in Polk County, Arkansas
