= Maple Street Overpass =

- U.S. National Register of Historic Places
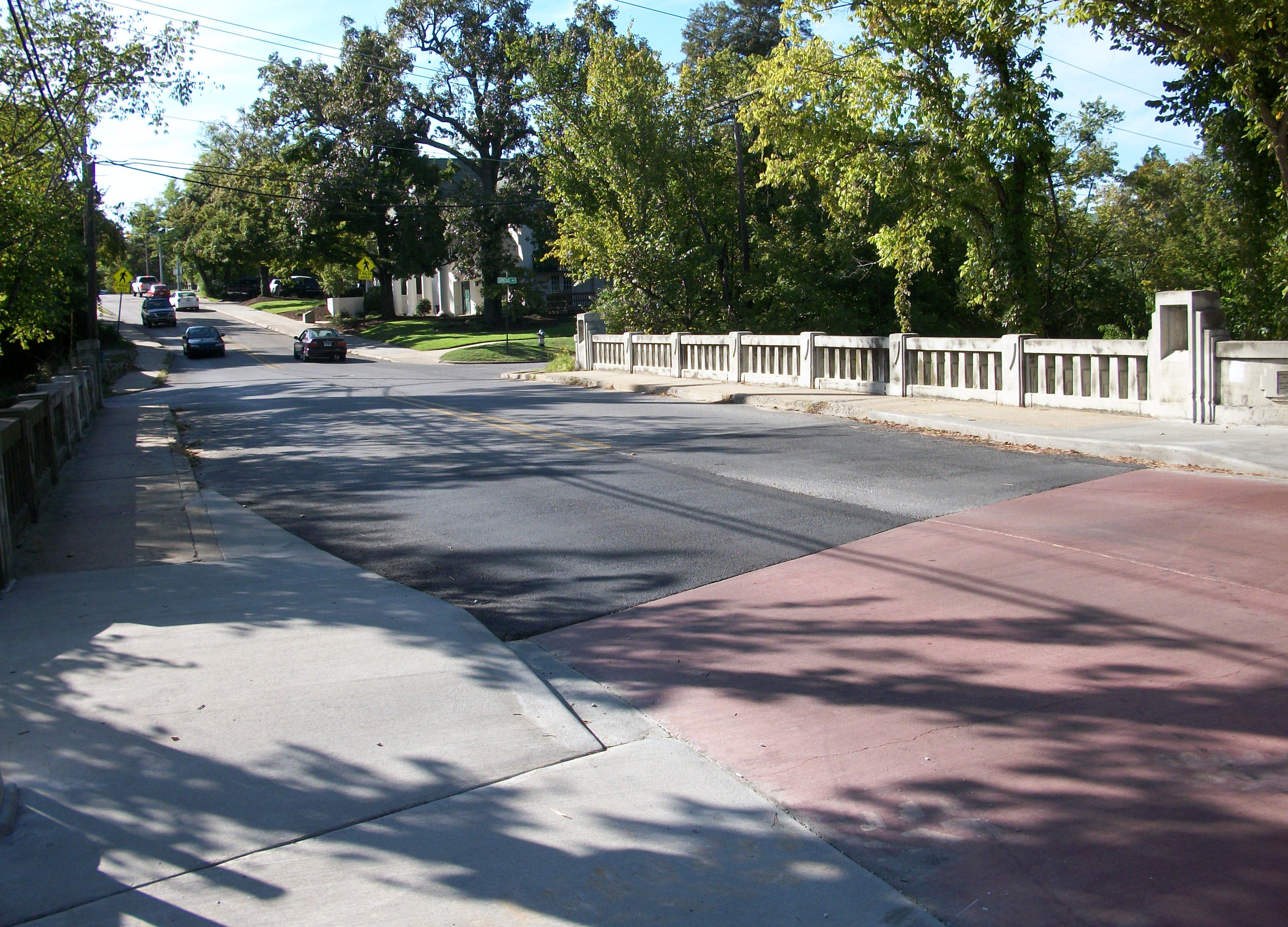

- Location within Arkansas Location within the United States
- Location: Maple Street over Frisco Railroad tracks, Fayetteville, Arkansas
- Coordinates: 36°4′12″N 94°10′0″W
- Area: less than one acre
- Built: 1936
- Architect: Frederick Lutt Johann
- Architectural style: Reinforced concrete open-spandrel arch
- MPS: Historic Bridges of Arkansas MPS
- NRHP reference No.: 95000654
- Added to NRHP: May 26, 1995

The Maple Street Overpass is a historic bridge in Fayetteville, Arkansas. The bridge carries West Maple Street over the railroad tracks running just east of the University of Arkansas at Fayetteville campus. It is a reinforced concrete single-span arch, 60 feet (18 m) in length and 25 feet (7.6 m) in width. The bridge has a decorative Art Deco balustrade with inset lights on both sides. The bridge was designed by regional bridge designer Frederick Lutt Johann, and built in 1936.

The bridge was listed on the National Register of Historic Places in 1995.

== See also ==
- List of bridges documented by the Historic American Engineering Record in Arkansas
- List of bridges on the National Register of Historic Places in Arkansas
- National Register of Historic Places listings in Washington County, Arkansas
