= Old River Bridge =

- U.S. National Register of Historic Places
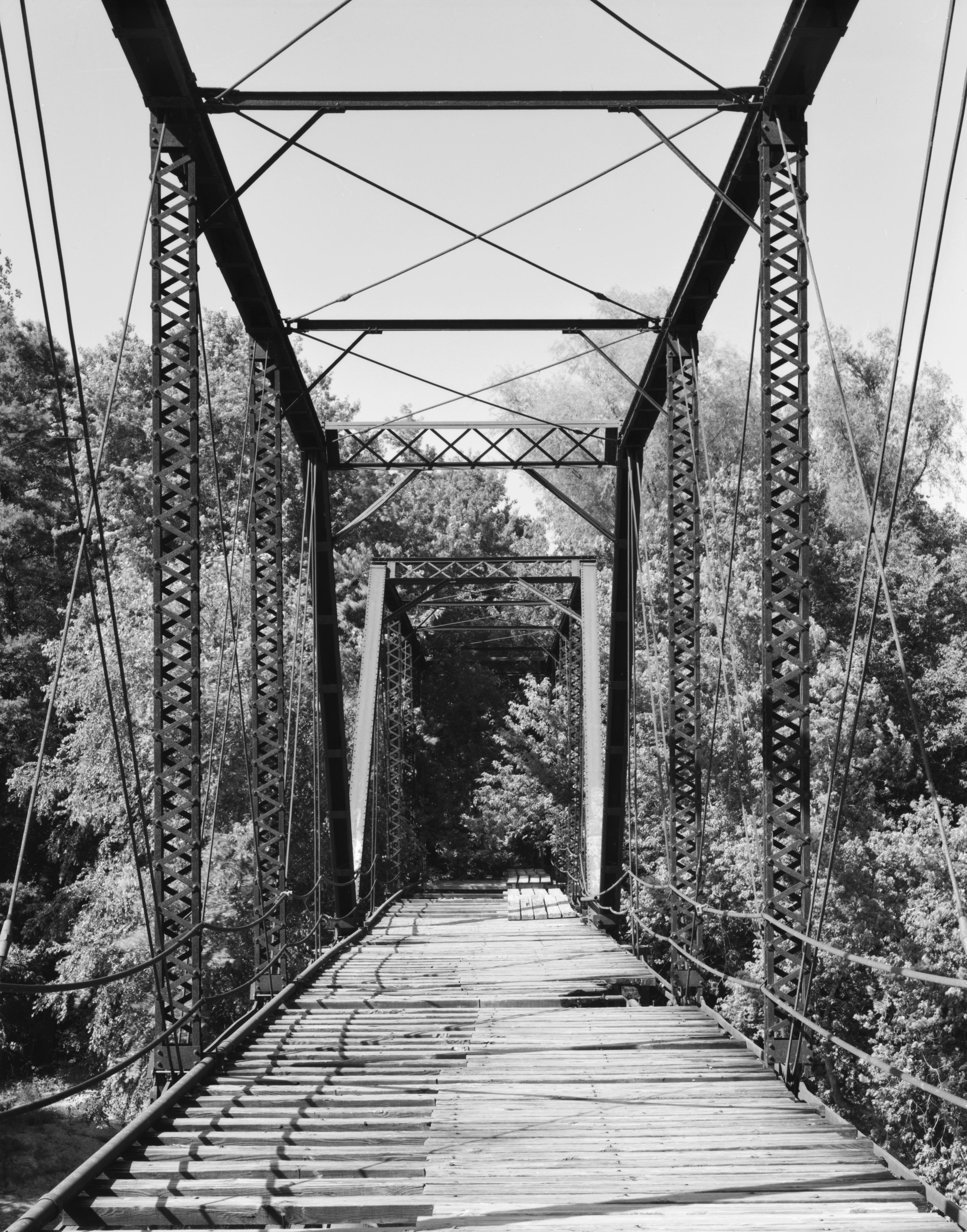
- HAER photo, 1988

- Location within Arkansas Location within the United States
- Nearest city: Benton, Arkansas
- Coordinates: 34°32′27″N 92°36′25″W
- Area: less than one acre
- Built: 1889
- NRHP reference No.: 77000277
- Added to NRHP: September 15, 1977

The Old River Bridge is a historic bridge spanning the Saline River near Benton in Saline County, Arkansas. Now closed to traffic, it formerly carried River Street in Benton across the river south of the city. It is a two-span through truss bridge, mounted on cylindrical concrete columns. It was built in 1889 along the route of the historic military road through the area, and is one of the state's oldest surviving bridges. It was taken out of service in 1974.

As of April 2020 the bridge has been taken down and will be rebuilt as part of the project to put a multi-use trail from Little Rock to Hot Springs on the path of the old Southwest Trail.

The bridge was listed on the National Register of Historic Places in 1977.

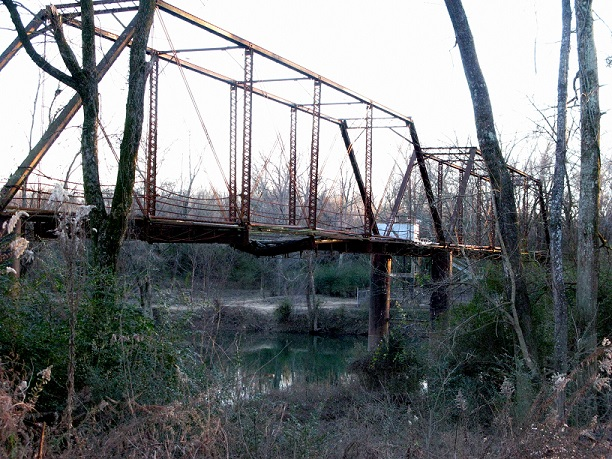
Bridge as of January, 2012

== See also ==
- List of bridges documented by the Historic American Engineering Record in Arkansas
- List of bridges on the National Register of Historic Places in Arkansas
- National Register of Historic Places listings in Saline County, Arkansas
