= DeGray Creek Bridge =

Historic bridge in Arkansas, U.S.

- U.S. National Register of Historic Places
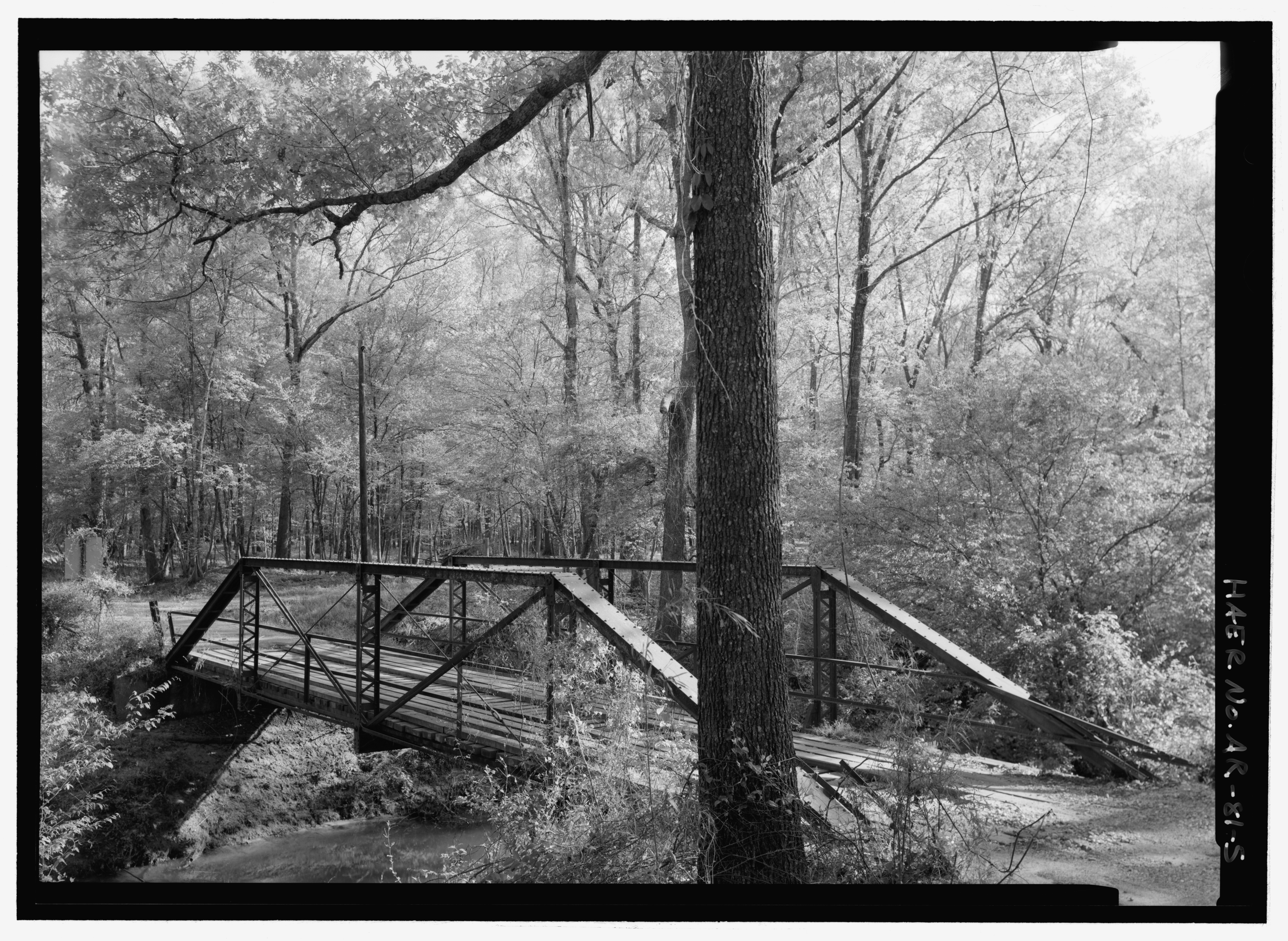

- Location within Arkansas Location within the United States
- Location: County Road 50 over DeGray Creek, Arkadelphia, Arkansas
- Coordinates: 34°9′21″N 93°9′38″W
- Area: less than one acre
- Built: 1915
- Architectural style: Pratt pony truss
- MPS: Historic Bridges of Arkansas MPS
- NRHP reference No.: 09001239
- Added to NRHP: January 21, 2010

The DeGray Creek Bridge is a historic bridge in rural Clark County, Arkansas. It carries County Road 50 (Blish Road) over DeGray Creek, west of the county seat Arkadelphia. It is single-span Pratt pony truss bridge that is 61 feet (19 m) long, resting on concrete abutments. Its trusses were purchased by the county from the Hope Bridge Company and the Stupp Brothers Bridge and Iron Works in 1915. They were moved to the present bridge circa 1970, when the original location was slated to be flooded by the construction of DeGray Dam.

The bridge was listed on the National Register of Historic Places in 2010.

== See also ==
- List of bridges documented by the Historic American Engineering Record in Arkansas
- List of bridges on the National Register of Historic Places in Arkansas
- National Register of Historic Places listings in Clark County, Arkansas
