= Buffalo River Bridge =

- Formerly listed on the U.S. National Register of Historic Places
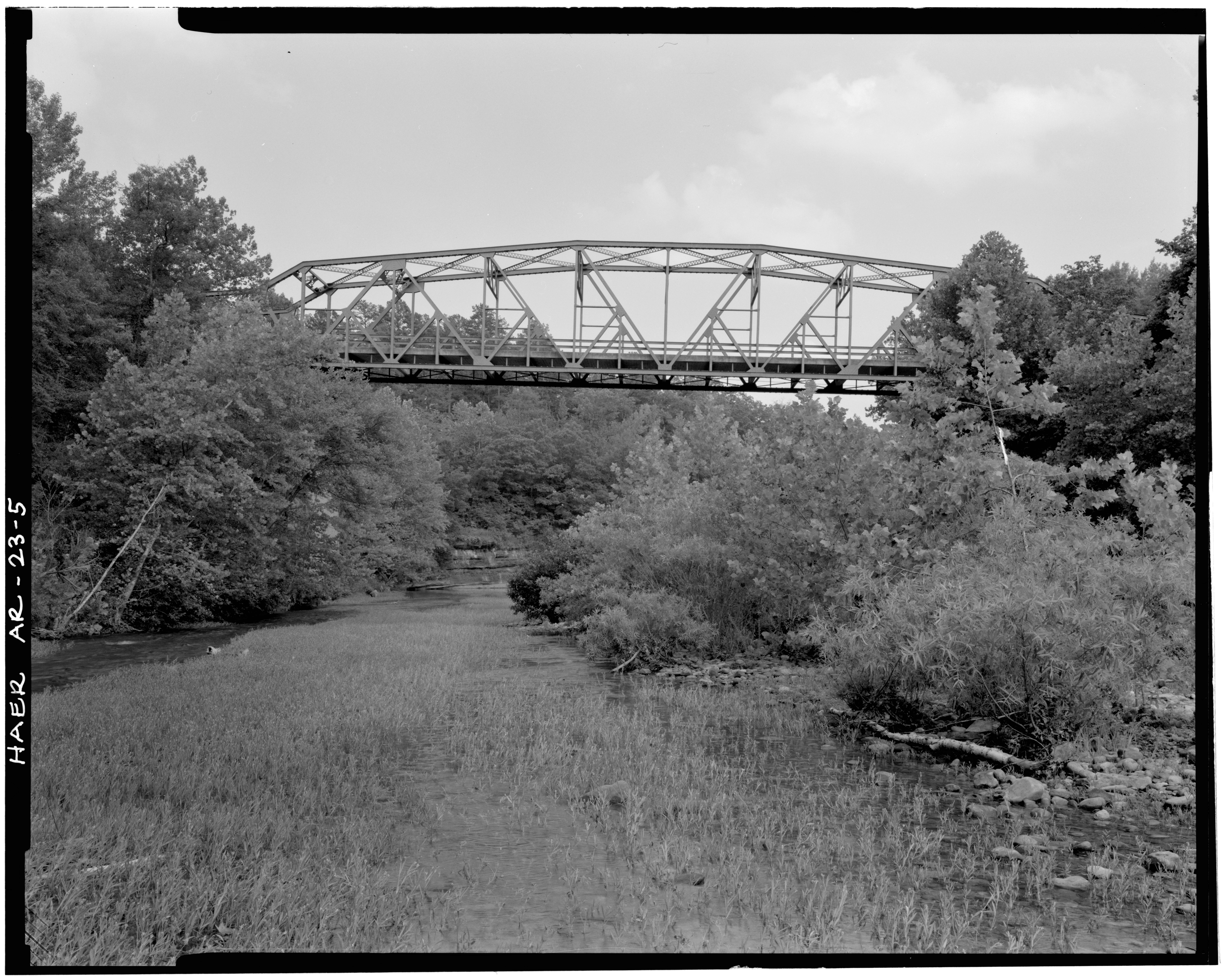
- Main span

- Location within Arkansas Location within the United States
- Location: AR 7 over the Buffalo River, Pruitt, Arkansas
- Coordinates: 36°3′40″N 93°8′17″W
- Area: less than one acre
- Built: 1931
- Architect: Arkansas Highway & Transportation, et al.
- Architectural style: Pennsylvania through truss
- Demolished: 2021
- MPS: Historic Bridges of Arkansas MPS
- NRHP reference No.: 90000509

Significant dates
- Added to NRHP: April 9, 1990
- Removed from NRHP: January 3, 2022

The Buffalo River Bridge was a historic bridge, carrying Arkansas Highway 7 across the Buffalo River in northeastern Newton County, Arkansas. It was located in the Buffalo National River, managed by the National Park Service. It was an unusual Pennsylvania through truss, with a center span of 160 feet (49 m) and a total structure length of 375 feet (114 m). The central truss was flanked at the ends by eight-panel Warren trusses. The bridge was built in 1931 by a Kansas contractor under contract to the state highway department. At the time of its listing on the National Register of Historic Places in 1990, it was one of four known Pennsylvania through trusses in the state. It was delisted in 2022 following demolition that began in 2021.

== See also ==
- List of bridges documented by the Historic American Engineering Record in Arkansas
- List of bridges on the National Register of Historic Places in Arkansas
- National Register of Historic Places listings in Newton County, Arkansas
