= West James Street Overpass =

Historic bridge in Arkansas, United States

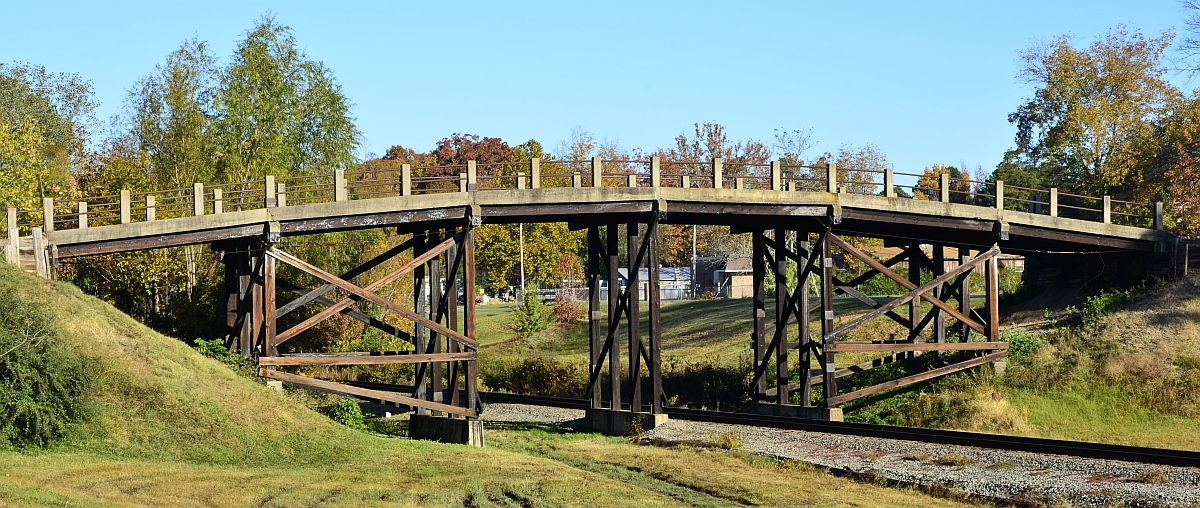
- Coordinates: 34°26′44″N 92°11′6″W
- Carries: Motor vehicles, pedestrians and bicycles
- Crosses: Union Pacific Railroad
- Locale: Redfield, Arkansas, U.S.
- Other name: West James Street Bridge

Characteristics
- Total length: 131 ft (40 m)
- Width: 26 ft (8 m)
- No. of lanes: 2

History
- Opened: 1924 (102 years ago)
- West James Street Overpass
- U.S. National Register of Historic Places
- MPS: Historic Bridges of Arkansas MPS
- NRHP reference No.: 95000609
- Added to NRHP: May 18, 1995

Location
- Interactive map of West James Street Overpass

The West James Street Overpass is a historic bridge in Redfield, Arkansas. It carries West James Street (or Avenue) across the Union Pacific railroad tracks near the center of the community.

It is a timber trestle structure, with six spans over a total length of 131 feet (40 m), a deck width of 20 feet (6.1 m), and an overall width of 26 feet (7.9 m). Its abutments are a combination of wood and concrete, and the posts supporting the trestles are mounted on concrete footings. It was built in 1924. The bridge was listed on the National Register of Historic Places in 1995.

== See also ==
- List of bridges documented by the Historic American Engineering Record in Arkansas
- List of bridges on the National Register of Historic Places in Arkansas
- National Register of Historic Places listings in Jefferson County, Arkansas
