= List of bridges documented by the Historic American Engineering Record in Arkansas =

This is a list of bridges documented by the Historic American Engineering Record in the U.S. state of Arkansas.

== Bridges ==
Survey No.	Name (as assigned by HAER)	Status	Type	Built	Documented	Carries	Crosses	Location	County	Coordinates
AR-5	Anthony Island Bridge	Replaced		1928		AR 7 (Arkadelphia Road)	Ouachita River	Hot Springs	Garland	34°25′59″N 93°05′15″W
AR-6	Lincoln Avenue Viaduct	Extant	Reinforced concrete through arch	1928	1988	AR 10 (Cantrell Road) westbound	Union Pacific Railroad	Little Rock	Pulaski	34°45′09″N 92°16′59″W
AR-7	Saline River Bridge	Replaced	Reinforced concrete open-spandrel arch	1928	1988	AR 229	Saline River	Benton	Saline	34°33′46″N 92°36′56″W
AR-8	Black River Bridge	Replaced	Swing span	1934	1988	US 67	Black River	Pocahontas	Randolph	36°15′16″N 90°58′15″W
AR-9	Harp Creek Bridge	Extant	Reinforced concrete open-spandrel arch	1928	1988	AR 7	Harp Creek	Harrison	Boone	36°04′58″N 93°08′14″W
AR-10	North Fork Bridge	Replaced	Cantilever	1937	1988	AR 5	North Fork River	Norfork	Baxter	36°12′49″N 92°17′11″W
AR-12	Newport Bridge	Replaced	Cantilever	1930	1988	AR 14 / AR 367	White River	Newport	Jackson	35°36′33″N 91°17′21″W
AR-13	Augusta Bridge	Replaced	Cantilever	1930	1988	US 64	White River	Augusta	Woodruff	35°17′23″N 91°23′39″W
AR-14	Red River Bridge	Demolished	Pennsylvania truss	1931	1988	US 82	Red River	Garland	Miller	33°21′21″N 93°42′22″W
AR-15	Cotter Bridge	Extant	Reinforced concrete through arch	1930	1988	US 62B	White River	Cotter	Baxter	36°16′02″N 92°32′39″W
AR-16	Buffalo River Bridge	Replaced	Reinforced concrete open-spandrel arch	1929	1988	US 65	Buffalo River	Marshall	Searcy	35°59′00″N 92°44′51″W
AR-17	Eight Mile Creek Bridge	Replaced	Pratt truss	1929	1988	US 49	Eight Mile Creek	Paragould	Greene	36°03′57″N 90°30′06″W
AR-18	St. Francis River Bridge	Abandoned	Vertical-lift bridge	1934	1988	AR 18	St. Francis River	Lake City	Craighead	35°49′16″N 90°25′55″W
AR-19	Ouachita River Bridge	Replaced	Cantilever	1930	1988	US 167	Ouachita River	Calion	Union and Calhoun	33°20′44″N 92°31′57″W
AR-20	St. Francis River Bridge	Extant	Swing span	1933	1988	US 70	St. Francis River	Forrest City	St. Francis	35°02′11″N 90°42′42″W
AR-21	White River Bridge	Demolished	Vertical-lift bridge	1924	1988	US 70	White River	De Valls Bluff	Prairie	34°47′26″N 91°26′45″W
AR-22	Big Piney Creek Bridge	Extant	Warren truss	1931	1988	AR 123	Big Piney Creek	Fort Douglas	Johnson	35°40′38″N 93°14′07″W
AR-23	Buffalo River Bridge	Replaced	Pennsylvania truss	1931	1988	AR 7	Buffalo River	Pruitt	Newton	36°03′40″N 93°08′17″W
AR-24	Lee Creek Bridge (No. 1)	Replaced	Pennsylvania truss	1934	1988	AR 59	Lee Creek	Natural Dam	Crawford	35°38′46″N 94°23′37″W
AR-25	Cache River Bridge	Abandoned	Parker truss	1934	1988	US 412	Cache River	Walnut Ridge	Lawrence	36°04′09″N 90°49′26″W
AR-26	St. Louis–San Francisco Bridge	Extant	Parker truss	1937	1988	US 62 / AR 115	Spring River	Imboden	Lawrence	36°12′21″N 91°10′19″W
AR-27	South Fork Bridge	Bypassed	Reinforced concrete closed-spandrel arch	1928	1988	AR 128 (former)	Saline River south fork	Fountain Lake	Garland	34°36′12″N 92°55′21″W
AR-28	Illinois River Bridge	Abandoned	Reinforced concrete closed-spandrel arch	1922	1988	CR 3 (Chamber Spring Road)	Illinois River	Siloam Springs	Benton	36°10′00″N 94°26′02″W
AR-29	Spavinaw Creek Bridge	Replaced	Warren truss	1909	1988	CR 29	Spavinaw Creek	Gravette	Benton	36°23′02″N 94°28′54″W
AR-30	Osage Creek Bridge	Replaced	Pratt truss	1911	1988	CR 71 (Colonel Myers Road)	Osage Creek	Healing Springs	Benton	36°14′26″N 94°15′12″W
AR-31	Cedar Creek Bridge	Extant	Stone arch	1934	1988	CR 5 (Red Bluff Drive)	Cedar Creek	Morrilton	Conway	35°07′43″N 92°55′30″W
AR-32	Springfield-Des Arc Bridge	Relocated	Bowstring arch truss	1874	1988	CR 222	Cadron Creek north branch	Springfield	Conway	35°08′30″N 92°27′14″W
AR-33	Cypress Creek Bridge	Replaced	Pratt truss	1915	1988	CR 64	Cypress Creek	Perry	Perry	35°03′14″N 92°47′52″W
AR-34	Mountain Fork Bridge	Extant	Pratt truss	1926	1988	CR 38	Mountain Fork Creek	Hatfield	Polk	34°31′42″N 94°23′59″W
AR-35	Little Cossatot River Bridge	Extant	Warren truss	1908	1988	CR 139	Little Cossatot River	Lockesburg	Sevier	33°58′30″N 94°12′18″W
AR-36	Spring Lake Bridge	Extant	Stone arch	1936	1988	CR 35	Bob Barnes Branch	Belleville	Yell	35°09′04″N 93°25′54″W
AR-37	Achmun Creek Bridge	Extant	Warren truss	1920	1988	CR 222	Achmun Creek	Ola	Yell	35°03′52″N 93°16′20″W
AR-38	Wyman Bridge	Replaced	Parker truss	1908	1988	CR 48	White River west fork	Fayetteville	Washington	36°04′23″N 94°04′52″W
AR-39	Lake No. 1 Bridge	Extant	Stone arch	1935	1988	Avondale Road	Lake No. 1	North Little Rock	Pulaski	34°47′21″N 92°15′09″W
AR-40	Edgemere Street Bridge	Extant	Stone arch	1935	1988	Edgemere Street	Lake No. 3	North Little Rock	Pulaski	34°47′40″N 92°15′00″W
AR-41	Second Street Bridge	Demolished	Reinforced concrete through arch	1915	1988	Second Street	Chicago, Rock Island and Pacific Railroad	Little Rock	Pulaski	34°44′46″N 92°15′32″W
AR-42	Fourteenth Street Bridge	Extant	King post truss	1925	1986	Fourteenth Street	Missouri Pacific Railroad	North Little Rock	Pulaski	34°46′03″N 92°16′11″W
AR-43	Mulladay Hollow Bridge	Extant	Stone arch	1935	1988	CR 61	Mulladay Hollow Creek	Eureka Springs	Carroll	36°26′06″N 93°45′56″W
AR-44	Little Missouri River Bridge	Abandoned	Parker truss	1908	1988	CR 179	Little Missouri River	Okolona and Boughton	Clark and Nevada	33°54′12″N 93°18′34″W
AR-45	Lee Creek Bridge	Extant	Pennsylvania truss	1900	1988	AR 220	Lee Creek	Chester	Crawford	35°42′12″N 94°19′38″W
AR-46	Old River Bridge	Abandoned	Pratt truss	1891	1988	Old Military Road (River Road)	Saline River	Benton	Saline	34°32′27″N 92°36′25″W
AR-47	Rockport Bridge	Replaced	Parker truss	1900	1988	AR 84 (former)	Ouachita River	Malvern	Hot Spring	34°23′08″N 92°50′20″W
AR-48	Winkley Bridge	Demolished	Suspension	1912	1988	AR 110 (former)	Little Red River	Heber Springs	Cleburne	35°29′24″N 91°58′24″W
AR-49	Clarendon Bridge	Demolished	Cantilever	1931	1988	US 79	White River	Clarendon	Monroe	34°41′20″N 91°18′59″W
AR-50	War Eagle Bridge	Extant	Parker truss	1907	1988	CR 98	War Eagle Creek	War Eagle	Benton	36°16′03″N 93°56′36″W
AR-51	Judsonia Bridge	Extant	Swing span	1924	1988	CR 66	Little Red River	Judsonia	White	35°16′03″N 91°38′23″W
AR-52	Lakeshore Drive Bridge	Extant	Stone arch	1935	1988	Lakeshore Drive	Lake No. 3 tributary	North Little Rock	Pulaski	34°47′41″N 92°15′06″W
AR-53	Beaver Bridge	Extant	Suspension	1949	1988	AR 187	White River	Beaver	Carroll	36°28′15″N 93°46′06″W
AR-54	Jenny Lind Bridge	Replaced	Stone arch	1940	1988	CR 8	Vache Grasse Creek	Jenny Lind	Sebastian	35°15′18″N 94°17′57″W
AR-55	Milltown Bridge	Extant	Stone arch	1940	1988	CR 77	Vache Grasse Creek tributary	Milltown	Sebastian	35°09′31″N 94°10′28″W
AR-56	Ouachita River Bridge	Replaced	Reinforced concrete open-spandrel arch	1929	1990	US 70	Ouachita River	Hot Springs	Garland	34°28′21″N 93°07′31″W
AR-58	Isabell Creek Bridge	Replaced	Reinforced concrete open-spandrel arch	1928	1992	AR 105	Isabell Creek	Atkins	Pope	35°21′32″N 92°57′33″W
AR-63	Woolsey Bridge	Replaced	Parker truss	1947	1994	CR 35	White River west fork	Woolsey	Washington	35°53′08″N 94°10′10″W
AR-64	Fryer's Ford Bridge	Replaced	Pratt truss	1891	2008	CR 67 (Fryer Bridge Road)	Point Remove Creek east fork	Solgohachia	Conway	35°16′10″N 92°42′49″W
AR-65	Frog Bayou Bridge	Abandoned	Parker truss	1922	2008	AR 282 (former)	Frog Bayou	Mountainburg	Crawford	35°37′04″N 94°11′03″W
AR-66	Nimrod Bridge	Extant	Parker truss	1908	2008	CR 18	Fourche La Fave River	Nimrod	Perry	34°56′10″N 93°03′19″W
AR-67	Fourche Lafave Bridge	Extant	Reinforced concrete open-spandrel arch	1941	2008	AR 7	Fourche La Fave River	Nimrod	Perry	34°57′07″N 93°09′08″W
AR-68	Maple Street Bridge	Extant	Reinforced concrete open-spandrel arch	1936	2008	Maple Street	St. Louis–San Francisco Railway	Fayetteville	Washington	36°04′12″N 94°10′00″W
AR-69	Baron Fork Bridges	Extant	Reinforced concrete closed-spandrel arch	1922	2008	CR 11 (former)	Baron Fork Creek and Bush Creek tributary	Morrow	Washington	35°52′35″N 94°27′12″W
AR-70	Ward's Crossing Bridge	Extant	Parker truss	1905	2005	CR 8 (Sunlight Bay Road)	Fourche La Fave River	Plainview	Yell	34°56′40″N 93°19′40″W
AR-71	Wire Ford Bridge	Extant	Pratt truss	1929	2008	CR 67 (Wire Road)	Mulberry River	Pleasant Hill and Cravens	Crawford and Franklin	35°31′50″N 94°02′27″W
AR-72	Waterside Street Bridge	Extant	Stone arch	1932	2007	Waterside Street	Lake No. 1 tributary	North Little Rock	Pulaski	34°46′59″N 92°14′46″W
AR-73	Buttram Ford Bridge	Extant	Pratt truss	1906	2007	AR 109 (former)	Petit Jean River	Sugar Grove	Logan	35°05′48″N 93°48′03″W
AR-74	Cedar Creek Bridge	Extant	Reinforced concrete closed-spandrel arch	1941	2007	CR 235 (Goodie Creek Road)	Cedar Creek	Rosie	Independence	35°38′35″N 91°32′27″W
AR-75	Cove Creek Tributary Bridge	Extant	Stone arch	1936	2007	AR 309	Cove Creek tributary	Corley	Logan	35°14′31″N 93°38′22″W
AR-76	Missouri & North Arkansas Railroad Bridge	Extant	Baltimore truss	1908	2008	CR 125	Little Red River middle fork	Shirley	Van Buren	35°39′34″N 92°19′19″W
AR-77	Tull Bridge	Bypassed	Pratt truss	1916	2008	AR 291 (former)	Saline River	Tull and Traskwood	Grant and Saline	34°26′29″N 92°35′59″W
AR-78	West James Street Bridge	Extant	Trestle	1924	2007	West James Street	Union Pacific Railroad	Redfield	Jefferson	34°26′44″N 92°11′06″W
AR-79	Lake Catherine State Park Bridge No. 2	Extant	Reinforced concrete cast-in-place slab	1939	2007	AR 171	Unnamed stream	Malvern	Hot Spring	34°25′46″N 92°56′21″W
AR-80	Little Buffalo River Bridge	Extant	Reinforced concrete T-beam	1937	2007	AR 327	Little Buffalo River	Parthenon	Newton	35°58′07″N 93°13′37″W
AR-81	DeGray Creek Bridge	Extant	Pratt truss	1915	2008	CR 50 (Blish Road)	DeGray Creek	Arkadelphia	Clark	34°09′14″N 93°09′38″W
AR-82	Island Slough Bridge	Abandoned	Pratt truss	1909	2007	CR 58 (Padgett Island Road)	Big Bottom Slough	Magness	Independence	35°40′13″N 91°28′38″W
AR-83	Cove Creek Spillway Bridge	Extant	Stone arch	1937	2007	AR 309	Cove Creek	Corley	Logan	35°13′58″N 93°37′45″W
AR-84	Cove Creek Bridge	Extant	Stone arch	1936	2007	AR 309	Cove Creek	Corley	Logan	35°11′35″N 93°37′24″W
AR-87	Bear Creek Bridge	Bypassed	Suspension	1941	2007	Cottonwood Road	Bear Creek	Harrison	Boone	36°20′44″N 93°07′52″W
AR-90	Lafayette Street Overpass	Extant	Reinforced concrete girder	1938	2007	Lafayette Street	St. Louis–San Francisco Railway	Fayetteville	Washington	36°04′07″N 94°09′59″W
AR-92	Danville Bridge	Demolished	Bowstring arch truss	1880	2007	Unnamed road	Petit Jean River	Mickles	Yell	35°04′20″N 93°17′51″W
AR-93	Point Remove Bridge	Bypassed	Pratt truss	1910	2007	Cherokee Road (former)	Point Remove Creek	Morrilton	Conway	35°08′41″N 92°46′06″W
AR-94	Harris Creek Bridge	Extant	Reinforced concrete closed-spandrel arch	1912	2007	CR 52 (Humpback Road)	Harris Creek	Dardanelle	Yell	35°09′46″N 93°10′18″W
AR-95	South Fork Little Red River Bridge	Replaced	Warren truss	1931	2007	US 65	Little Red River south fork	Clinton	Van Buren	35°35′15″N 92°27′06″W
AR-96	Huntsville Road Bridge	Extant	Stone arch	1860	2007	CR 170 (Goff Farm Road)	Unnamed stream	Fayetteville	Washington	36°02′38″N 94°06′35″W
AR-103	Marble Bridge	Extant	Stone arch	1891	2007	CR 317 (Lake Road)	Unnamed stream	Eureka Springs	Carroll	36°22′47″N 93°44′07″W
AR-104	Gulpha Gorge Bridges Nos. 1-4	Extant	Reinforced concrete closed-spandrel arch	1937	2007	AR 7 (Gorge Road)	Gulpha Creek	Hot Springs	Garland	34°31′19″N 93°02′05″W
AR-105	Miller Creek Bridge	Extant	Reinforced concrete closed-spandrel arch	1914	2008	CR 86 (Miller Creek Road)	Miller Creek	Batesville	Independence	35°46′56″N 91°37′19″W
TN-14	Memphis Bridge (Note: See also HAER No. NE-2, "Nebraska City Bridge" for additional documentation)	Extant	Cantilever	1892	1985	BNSF Railway	Mississippi River	West Memphis, Arkansas, and Memphis, Tennessee	Crittenden County, Arkansas, and Shelby County, Tennessee	35°07′43″N 90°04′35″W
