= Goff Farm Stone Bridge =

- U.S. National Register of Historic Places
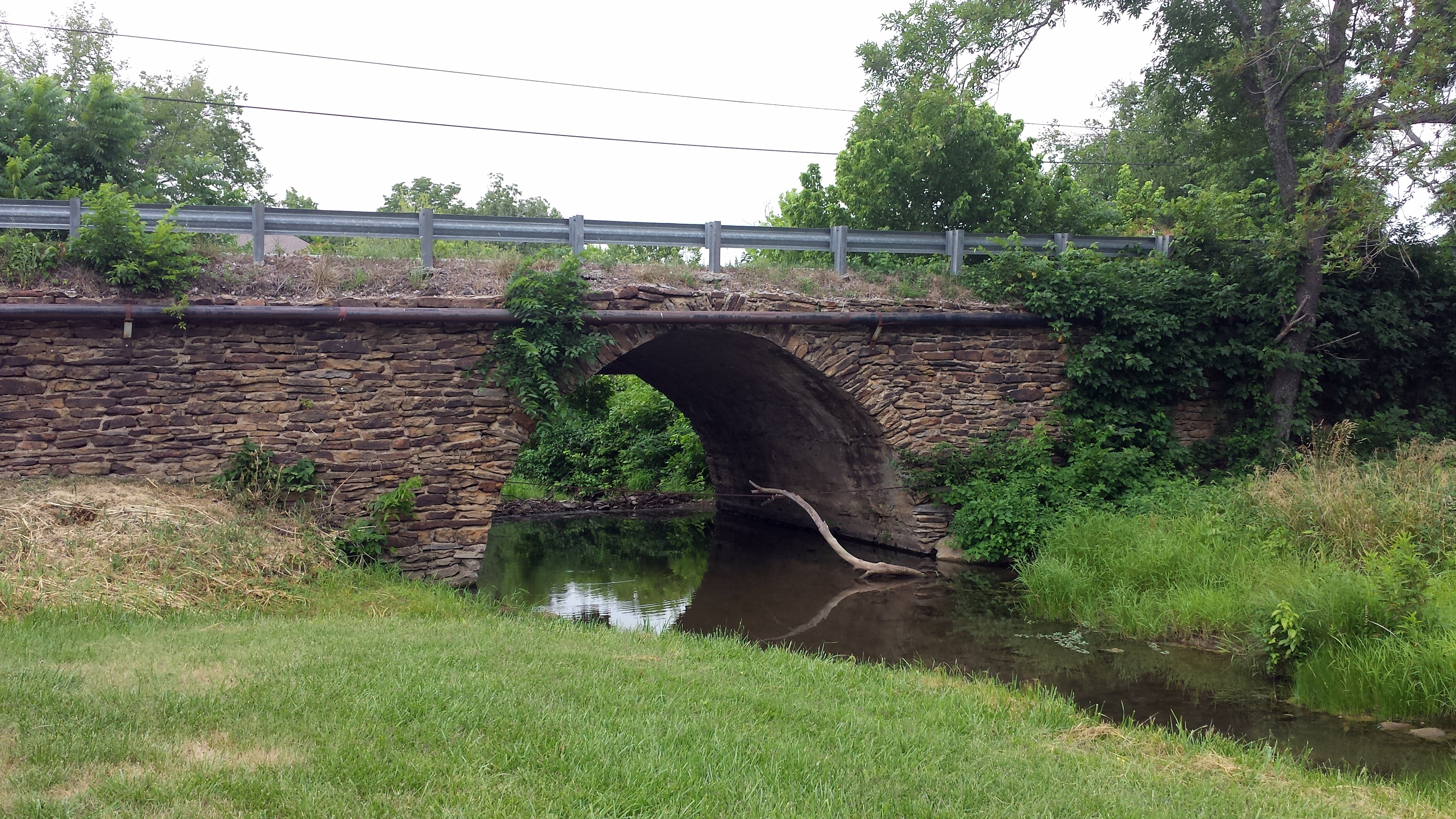

- Location within Arkansas Location within the United States
- Nearest city: Fayetteville, Arkansas
- Coordinates: 36.04398°N 94.10977°W
- Area: less than one acre
- Built: 1860
- Architectural style: Masonry deck arch
- MPS: Historic Bridges of Arkansas MPS
- NRHP reference No.: 09001262
- Added to NRHP: January 21, 2010

The Goff Farm Stone Bridge is a historic bridge in eastern Fayetteville, Arkansas. It carries Goff Farm Road (County Road 170) across an unnamed creek just north of Stonebridge Meadows Golf Club. The bridge is a single-span stone arch with a span of 20 feet (6.1 m) and a total bridge length of 150 feet (46 m). The bridge's builder is unknown, and its design suggests it was built circa 1860, when the road it carries was a major east–west thoroughfare connecting Fayetteville and Huntsville. It is believed to be the oldest masonry bridge in the state, and is one of the state's small number of surviving 19th-century stone bridges.

The bridge was listed on the National Register of Historic Places in 2010.

== See also ==
- List of bridges documented by the Historic American Engineering Record in Arkansas
- List of bridges on the National Register of Historic Places in Arkansas
- National Register of Historic Places listings in Washington County, Arkansas
