= Miller Creek Bridge =

- U.S. National Register of Historic Places
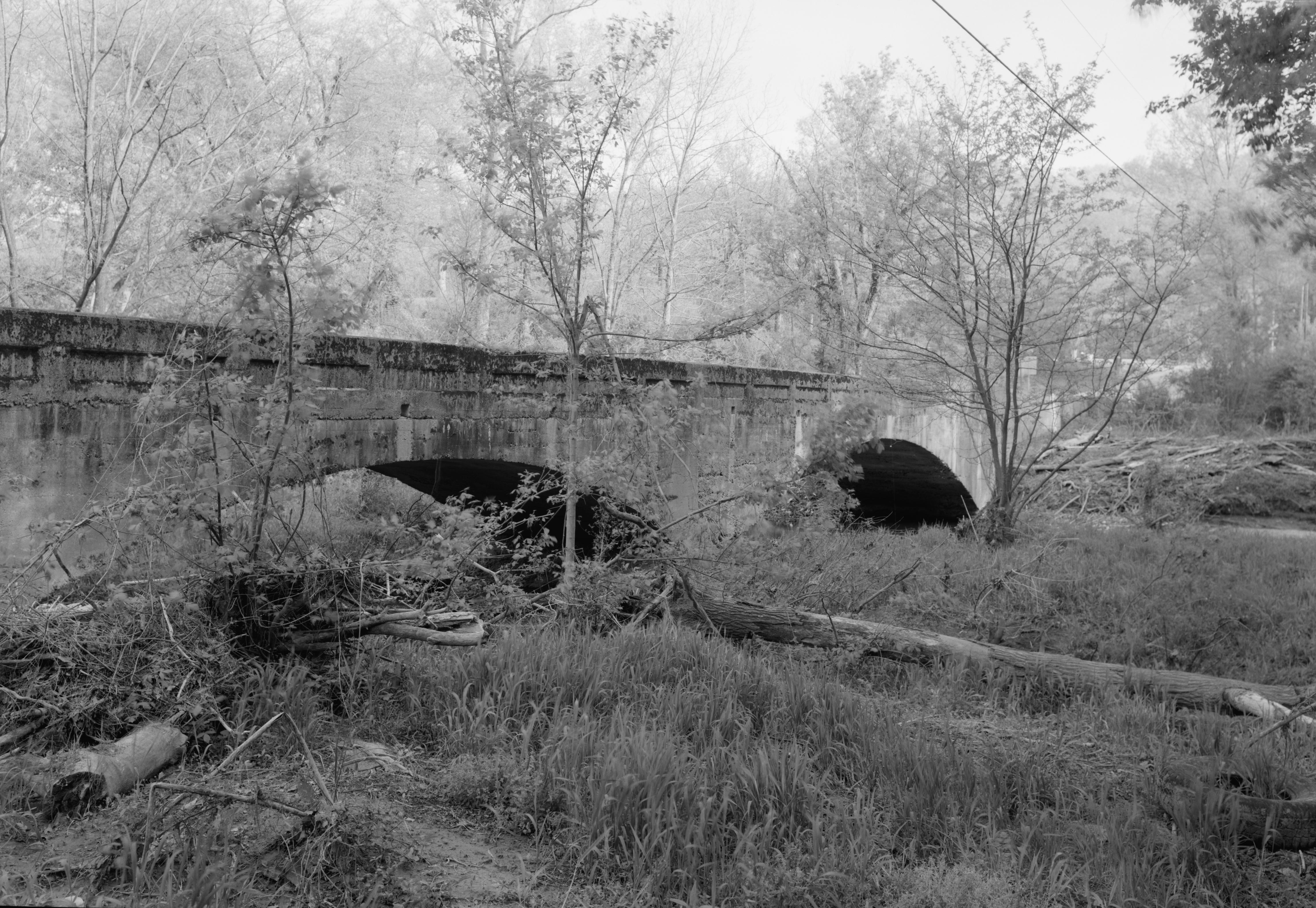
- HAER photo, 2008

- Location within Arkansas Location within the United States
- Nearest city: Batesville, Arkansas
- Coordinates: 35°46′56″N 91°37′19″W
- Area: less than one acre
- Built: 1914
- Architect: Jack Hanford, W. E. Fugett
- Architectural style: Concrete arch
- MPS: Historic Bridges of Arkansas MPS
- NRHP reference No.: 09001249
- Added to NRHP: January 21, 2010

The Miller Creek Bridge is a historic bridge, carrying Miller Creek Road across Miller Creek, just north of the city limits of Batesville, Arkansas. Built in 1914, it is the state's oldest surviving concrete bridge. It is a two-span arched structure with a total length of 123 feet (37 m), and a width of 12 feet (3.7 m), carrying a single lane of traffic. The bridge is somewhat overengineered, as the use of concrete in bridge construction was then relatively new, and knowledge of the material's properties in this application was not well understood.

The bridge was listed on the National Register of Historic Places in 2010.

== See also ==
- List of bridges documented by the Historic American Engineering Record in Arkansas
- List of bridges on the National Register of Historic Places in Arkansas
- National Register of Historic Places listings in Independence County, Arkansas
