= Rosie, Arkansas =

- Unincorporated community
- Location within Arkansas Location within the United States
- Coordinates: 35°40′06″N 91°32′18″W
- Country: United States
- State: Arkansas
- County: Independence
- Elevation: 266 ft (81 m)
- Time zone: UTC-6 (Central (CST))
  - Summer (DST): UTC-5 (CDT)
- ZIP code: 72571
- Area code: 870
- GNIS feature ID: 54216

Rosie is an unincorporated community in Independence County, Arkansas, United States. Rosie is located on Arkansas Highway 14, 9 miles (14 km) southeast of Batesville. Rosie has a post office with ZIP code 72571.
