= Cedar Ridge High School (Arkansas) =

Location
- 1500 North Hill Street; Newark, Arkansas 72411; United States
- 35°43′12″N 91°26′48″W

Information
- School type: Public comprehensive
- Status: Open
- School district: Cedar Ridge School District
- Superintendent: Rodger Reid
- CEEB code: 041814
- NCES School ID: 050007000768
- Principal: Colyn Bowman
- Teaching staff: 81.30 (on an FTE basis)
- Grades: 6–12
- Enrollment: 359 (2023–2024)
- Student to teacher ratio: 4.42
- Education system: ADE Smart Core
- Classes offered: Regular, Advanced Placement (AP)
- Colors: Orange and blue
- Athletics conference: 2A Region 3 (Football); 2A Region 2 (Basketball)
- Mascot: Timberwolf
- Team name: Cedar Ridge Timberwolves
- Accreditation: ADE; AdvancED (1988–)
- Communities served: Newark, Charlotte, Oil Trough
- Feeder to: Newark Elementary School; Cord-Charlotte Elementary School
- Affiliation: Arkansas Activities Association
- Website: www.cedarwolves.org

Cedar Ridge High School is an accredited comprehensive public high school located in Newark, Arkansas, United States. The school provides secondary education in grades 6 through 12 for approximately 220 square miles (570 km^{2}) of rural, distant communities of eastern Independence County, Arkansas including Newark, Cord, Charlotte, and Oil Trough. It is administered by the Cedar Ridge School District. In 2003, Cedar Ridge School District was formed resulting in the consolidation of the former Cord-Charlotte High School and Newark High School.

== Academics ==
Cedar Ridge High School is a Title I school that is accredited by the ADE and has been accredited by AdvancED since 1988.

=== Curriculum ===
The assumed course of study follows the Smart Core curriculum developed by the Arkansas Department of Education (ADE), which requires students complete at least 22 units prior to graduation. Students complete regular coursework and exams and may take Advanced Placement (AP) courses and exam with the opportunity to receive college credit.

== Athletics ==
The Cedar Ridge High School mascot is the Timberwolf. The current school colors borrow from the older districts — orange from Newark, and blue from Cord-Charlotte.

The Cedar Ridge Timberwolves compete in interscholastic activities within the 2A Classification administered by the Arkansas Activities Association.

- Basketball: The boys basketball team won its back-to-back Class 2A state basketball championships in 2013 and 2014. In 2016, the Timberwolves collected their third state championship and first 3A title.

== Alumni ==
- Austin Reaves: National Basketball Association player
