= Oil Trough, Arkansas =

- Town
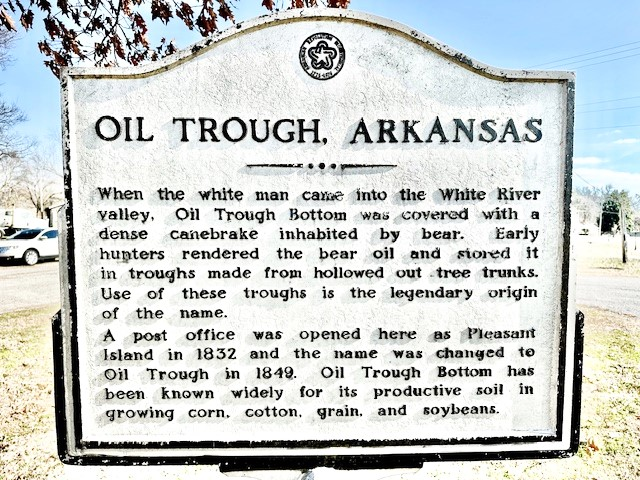
- Roadside marker, Oil Trough, Ark., February 2025

- Location of Oil Trough in Independence County, Arkansas.
- Coordinates: 35°37′45″N 91°27′40″W
- Country: United States
- State: Arkansas
- County: Independence

Area
  - Total: 0.23 sq mi (0.59 km^{2})
  - Land: 0.23 sq mi (0.59 km^{2})
  - Water: 0 sq mi (0.00 km^{2})
- Elevation: 236 ft (72 m)

Population (2020)
  - Total: 226
  - Estimate (2025): 222 ▼
  - Density: 987.9/sq mi (381.42/km^{2})
- Time zone: UTC-6 (Central (CST))
  - Summer (DST): UTC-5 (CDT)
- ZIP code: 72564
- Area code: 870
- FIPS code: 05-51410
- GNIS feature ID: 2407039

Oil Trough is a town in Independence County, Arkansas, United States. As of the 2020 census, Oil Trough had a population of 226. The post office opened here in 1832 under the name Pleasant Island, with a switch to the Oil Trough name in 1849. The town is believed to have acquired its name from a trough used to render bear fat, which was then sold to customers in New Orleans.

== Geography ==
Oil Trough is located on the south bank of the White River along Arkansas Highway 14 between Elmo, approximately four miles to the east and Rosie, five miles to the west. Arkansas Highway 122 crosses the White River about one mile east of the community, and connects to Newark, about five miles to the north.

According to the United States Census Bureau, the town has a total area of 0.5 km^{2} (0.2 mi^{2}), all land.

== Demographics ==
Historical population
Census	Pop.	Note	%±
1960	237		—
1970	524		121.1%
1980	280		−46.6%
1990	208		−25.7%
2000	218		4.8%
2010	260		19.3%
2020	226		−13.1%
2025 (est.)	222	▼	−1.8%
U.S. Decennial Census

As of the census of 2010, there were 260 people, 95 households, and 66 families residing in the town. The population density was 443.0/km^{2} (1,139.0/mi^{2}). There were 105 housing units at an average density of 213.4/km^{2} (548.6/mi^{2}). The racial makeup of the town was 93.58% White, 3.21% Black or African American, 1.38% Native American, and 1.83% from two or more races.

There were 95 households, out of which 34.7% had children under the age of 18 living with them, 49.5% were married couples living together, 12.6% had a female householder with no husband present, and 30.5% were non-families. 29.5% of all households were made up of individuals, and 14.7% had someone living alone who was 65 years of age or older. The average household size was 2.29 and the average family size was 2.74.

In the town, the population was spread out, with 27.5% under the age of 18, 4.6% from 18 to 24, 27.5% from 25 to 44, 27.1% from 45 to 64, and 13.3% who were 65 years of age or older. The median age was 38 years. For every 100 females, there were 98.2 males. For every 100 females age 18 and over, there were 90.4 males.

The median income for a household in the town was $31,528, and the median income for a family was $33,750. Males had a median income of $30,500 versus $21,250 for females. The per capita income for the town was $14,079. About 13.3% of families and 11.0% of the population were below the poverty line, including 9.6% of those under the age of 18 and 22.2% of those 65 or over.

== Education ==
Residents are zoned to the Cedar Ridge School District.

On July 1, 1990, the Oil Trough School District was dissolved, with portions going to the Newark School District and the Southside School District. The Newark district, which took Oil Trough itself, merged into the Cedar Ridge School District on July 1, 2004.

== Historic sites ==
Oil Trough locations on the National Register of Historic Places include Hankins’ Store and the Hulsey Bend School.
