= Midlands School District (Arkansas) =

School district in Arkansas

The Midland School District is based in Pleasant Plains, Arkansas and operates the public schools in Independence County, Arkansas. The district was formed in 1985 when the schools in Floral and Pleasant Plains were consolidated.

Schools in the district include;

- Midland Elementary School (347 Students) in Floral
- Midland High School (241 students) in Pleasant Plains

Compared to a state average of 56%, 63% of the students in this district qualified for free or reduced-price meals.

This district spends $6,824 per student per year. The state average is $8,128.

The district is governed by a Board of Education of six elected members.

- Bryson Wood
- Connie Blevins
- Deborah Frazier
- Brandon Bowren
- Robert ("Bub") Beel
- Bob Rhew

Dean Stanley is the district's superintendent.

- Clint McCance, a former school board member, submitted his resignation letter to the Midland School District on Sunday October 31, 2010 due to controversial statements regarding homosexuality. He was removed on November 1, 2010.
