= Akron Cemetery =

Historic cemetery in Arkansas, United States

- U.S. National Register of Historic Places
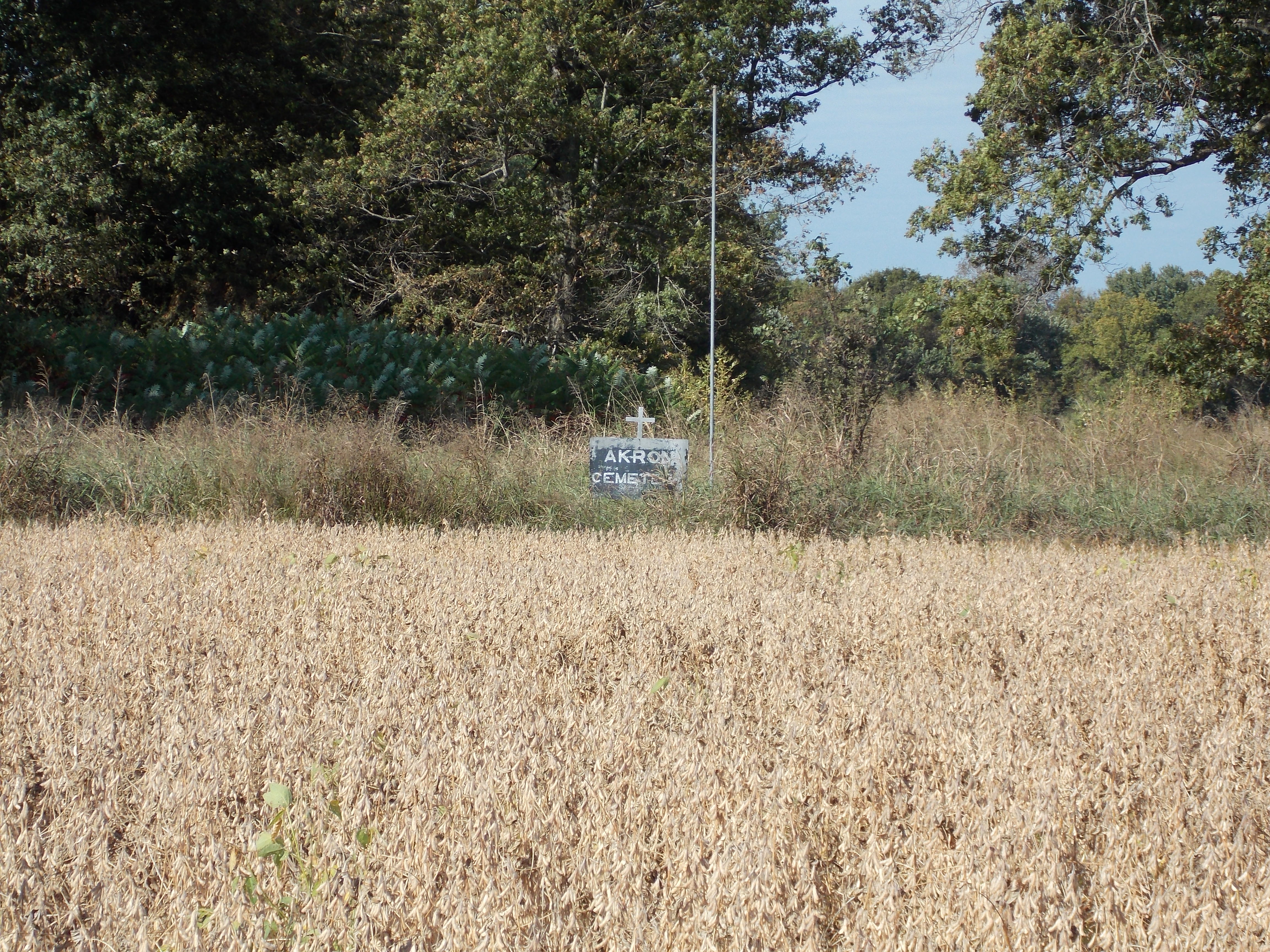

- Location within Arkansas Location within the United States
- Location: Approx. 2 mi. S of Newark on AR 122, near Newark, Arkansas
- Coordinates: 35°39′53″N 91°26′58″W
- Area: 1 acre (0.40 ha)
- Built: 1829
- NRHP reference No.: 02001072
- Added to NRHP: October 4, 2002

The Akron Cemetery is a historic cemetery in rural southeastern Independence County, Arkansas. The 1-acre (0.40 ha) cemetery is located on the west side of Arkansas Highway 122, about 2 miles (3.2 km) south of Newark, on top of a Native American mound. With its oldest recorded burial dating to 1829, it is possibly the oldest cemetery in the county, and is known to be the burial site of some of the Newark area's earliest settlers. It is all that survives of the community of Big Bottom, and early settlement that was renamed Akron in 1880, and was abandoned around 1940.

The cemetery was listed on the National Register of Historic Places in 2002.

== See also ==
- Walnut Grove Cemetery
- National Register of Historic Places listings in Independence County, Arkansas
