= Walnut Grove Cemetery (Cord, Arkansas) =

Historic cemetery in Arkansas, United States

- U.S. National Register of Historic Places
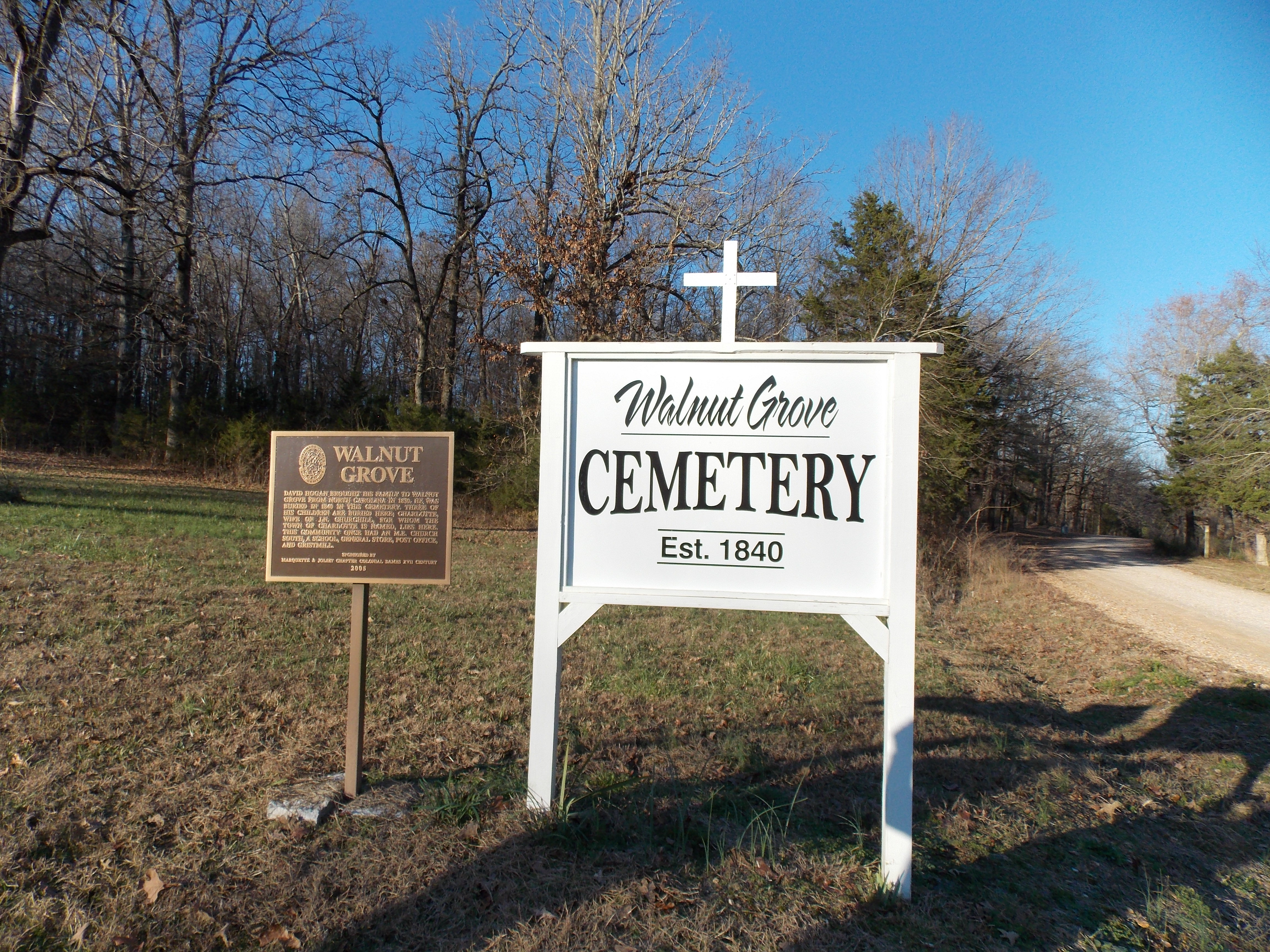

- Location within Arkansas Location within the United States
- Location: Walden Rd.
- Coordinates: 35°50′16″N 91°23′14″W
- Area: 4 acres (1.6 ha)
- Built: 1840
- NRHP reference No.: 13000786
- Added to NRHP: September 30, 2013

The Walnut Grove Cemetery is a historic cemetery in rural Independence County, Arkansas, United States, on Walden Road, just north of Arkansas Highway 25, northwest of Cord. Established in 1840, it is one of the oldest cemeteries in the area, set on what was once the only major roadway through the region. It is the only significant surviving element of the community of Walnut Grove, which was located at a locally important crossroads in the 19th century.

The cemetery was listed on the National Register of Historic Places in 2013.

== See also ==
- Akron Cemetery
- National Register of Historic Places listings in Independence County, Arkansas
