= Arkansas Highway 37 =

State highway in Arkansas, United States

Highway 37

Route information
- Maintained by ArDOT
- Existed: 1926–present

Section 1
- Length: 20.9 mi (33.6 km)
- South end: AR 17 near McCrory
- North end: AR 14 in Amagon

Section 2
- Length: 31.9 mi (51.3 km)
- South end: AR 14 near Amagon
- Major intersections: I-57 / US 67 near Tuckerman
- North end: AR 122 at Cord

Section 3
- Length: 0.61 mi (980 m)
- South end: US 62 in Gateway
- North end: Route 37 at the Missouri state line in Gateway

Location
- Country: United States
- State: Arkansas
- Counties: Woodruff, Jackson, Independence, Benton

Highway system
- Arkansas Highway System; Interstate; US; State; Business; Spurs; Suffixed; Scenic; Heritage
← AR 36	→ AR 38
← AR 46	AR 47	→ AR 48

Arkansas Highway 37 (AR 37) is a designation for three state highways in Arkansas. One segment of 20.9 miles (33.6 km) runs from Highway 17 north of McCrory north to Highway 14 in Amagon. A second segment of 31.9 miles (51.3 km) runs from Highway 14 east of Amagon north to Highway 122 at Cord. A third segment of 0.61 miles (0.98 km) runs from U.S. Route 62 (US 62) in Gateway north to the Missouri state line.

== Route description ==
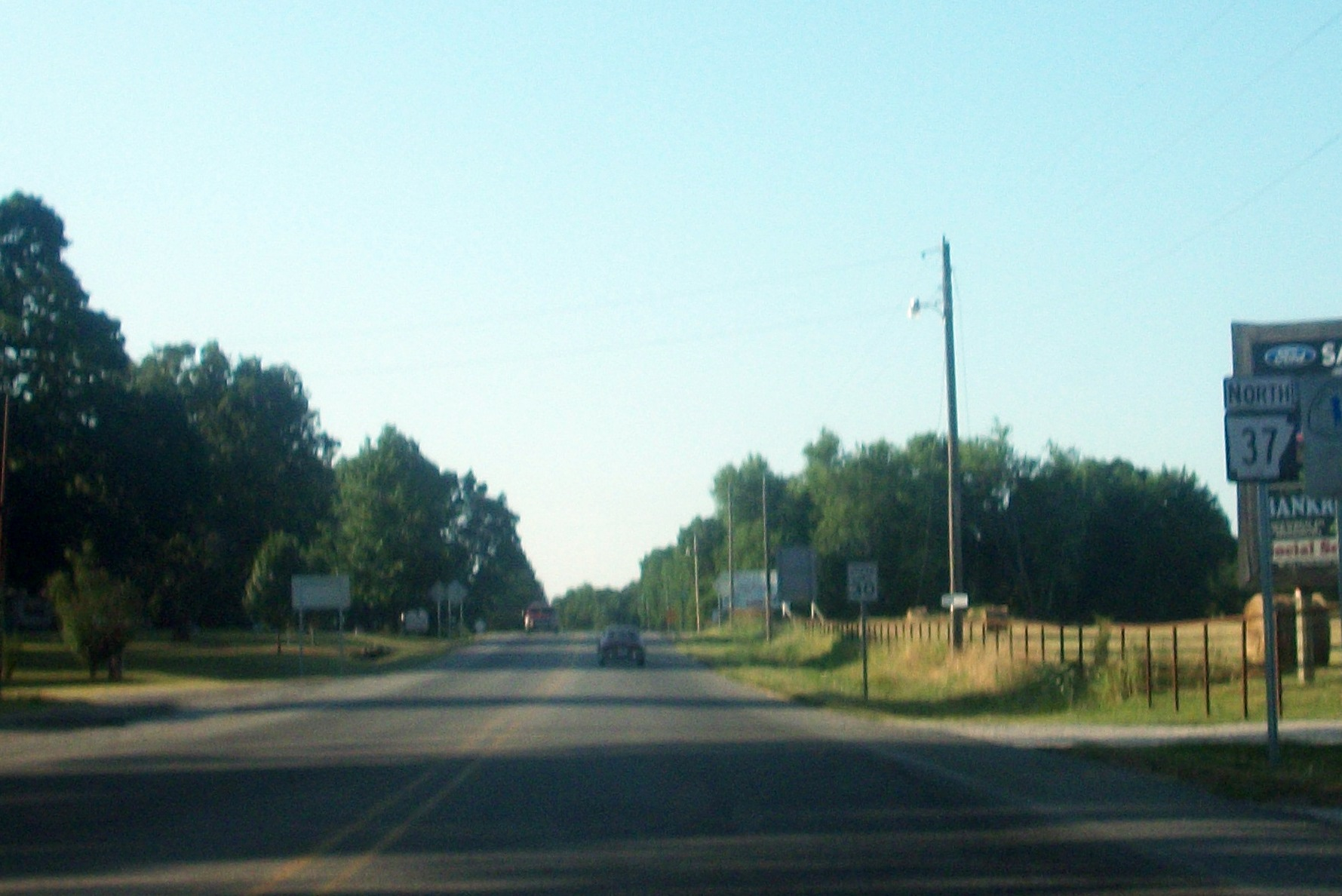
Highway 37 near its southern terminus in Gateway.

=== McCrory to Amagon ===
Highway 37 begins at Highway 17 north of McCrory and runs north to Highway 145 near Beedeville, before meeting Highway 14 in Amagon, where it terminates.

=== Amagon to Cord ===
The route begins at Highway 14 east of Amagon and runs north, passing near the Cache River National Wildlife Refuge. Highway 37 continues north to Highway 18 in Grubbs and I-57/US 67 east of Tuckerman. The route also passes the historic Tuckerman Water Tower in Tuckerman. Highway 37 continues northwest to Highway 122 at Cord, where it terminates.

=== Gateway to Missouri ===
The route begins at US 62 in Gateway and runs north to the Missouri state line, where it continues as Missouri Route 37.

== Major intersections ==
Mile markers reset at concurrencies.

County	Location	mi	km	Destinations	Notes
Woodruff		0.0	0.0	AR 17 – McCrory, Tupelo	Southern terminus
Woodruff		0.6	0.97	AR 269 south – Morton	Northern terminus of AR 269
Woodruff		4.4	7.1	AR 145 north	Southern terminus of AR 145
Jackson		6.8	10.9	AR 33 south – Tupelo	Northern terminus of AR 33
Jackson		8.9	14.3	AR 42 east – Hickory Ridge	Western terminus of AR 42
Jackson		14.1	22.7	AR 145 north – Blackville	Southern terminus of AR 145
Jackson	Amagon	20.9	33.6	AR 14 – Newport, Waldenburg	Northern terminus
Jackson	Gap in route				
Jackson		0.0	0.0	AR 14 / AR 384 south – Balch, Waldenburg, Newport	Southern terminus; northern terminus of AR 384
Jackson		6.5	10.5	AR 18 east – Jonesboro, Cash	Southern end of AR 18 concurrency
Jackson	Grubbs	0.0	0.0	AR 18 west – Newport	Northern end of AR 18 concurrency
Jackson		6.4	10.3	I-57 / US 67 – Newport, Little Rock, Cash, Jonesboro	Exit 95 on I-57
Jackson	Tuckerman	12.5	20.1	AR 367 north – Hoxie	Southern end of AR 367 concurrency; former US 67 north
Jackson	Tuckerman	0.0	0.0	AR 367 south – Newport	Northern end of AR 367 concurrency; former US 67 south
Jackson		2.4	3.9	AR 226 west	Eastern terminus of AR 226
Jackson		5.3	8.5	AR 17 south – Diaz	Northern terminus of AR 17
Independence	Cord	12.9	20.8	AR 122 to AR 25 – Newark	Northern terminus
Gap in route
Benton	Gateway	0.00	0.00	US 62 – Eureka Springs, Rogers, Fayetteville	Southern terminus
Benton		0.61	0.98	Route 37 north – Seligman	Continuation into Missouri
1.000 mi = 1.609 km; 1.000 km = 0.621 mi

== History ==
Highway 47
- Location: Benton County
- Existed: 1926–1979

Arkansas Highway 37 was first formed in the original 1926 state highway plan as a route from Highway 17 near McCrory north to Highway 18 near Grubbs. By 1940, the route had been extended north to Tuckerman, existing as a gravel road, and in some portions, an unimproved dirt road. By 1945, the routing was extended to Cord. The highway's routing has remained essentially unchanged since this extension, though the route is now paved.

Highway 47 was the former designation for US 62 between Rogers and Gateway and Highway 37 between Gateway and the Missouri state Line. Running a distance of approximately 18 miles (29 km), its southern terminus was at the intersection of US 71 (8th & Walnut Streets) in Rogers then passed through the communities of Avoca and Garfield before it ended at the Missouri state line just north of Gateway. When US 62 was designated in Arkansas in 1930, Highway 47 was truncated to the 1/2-mile (0.80 km) segment from Gateway to the Missouri state line where it continued as Missouri Route 37. The brief connector segment was renumbered in January 1976 to match the Missouri designation, thus providing continuity for travelers seeking Eureka Springs.
