= Arkansas Highway 394 =

State highway in Arkansas, United States

Highway 394

Route information
- Maintained by ArDOT

Southern section
- Length: 7.67 mi (12.34 km)
- East end: AR 69 near Magness
- West end: AR 69 in Batesville

Northern section
- Length: 1.45 mi (2.33 km)
- South end: AR 233 in Batesville
- North end: US 167 north of Batesville

Location
- Country: United States
- State: Arkansas

Highway system
- Arkansas Highway System; Interstate; US; State; Business; Spurs; Suffixed; Scenic; Heritage
← AR 393	→ AR 395

Arkansas Highway 394 (AR 394, Hwy. 394) is the name of two state highways in Independence County, Arkansas.

== Southern section ==
Arkansas Highway 394 is a state highway of 7.7 miles (12.4 km). It begins at AR 69 in south Batesville. It runs southeast to Magness, where it terminates at AR 69. The entire route is in Independence County.

Location	mi	km	Destinations	Notes
Magness	0.00	0.00	AR 69 – Newark	
Batesville	7.67	12.34	AR 69 – Batesville, Newark	
1.000 mi = 1.609 km; 1.000 km = 0.621 mi

== Northern section ==
Arkansas Highway 394 is a state highway of 1.5 miles (2.4 km). It starts again in Batesville from AR 233 and heads north to US 167. The entire route is in Batesville, Independence County.

mi	km	Destinations	Notes
0.00	0.00	AR 233	
1.45	2.33	US 167 – Batesville, Cave City	
1.000 mi = 1.609 km; 1.000 km = 0.621 mi
