= Oil Trough School District =

Defunct school district in Arkansas, United States

Oil Trough School District was a school district headquartered in Oil Trough, Arkansas.

On July 1, 1990, the Oil Trough School District was dissolved, with portions going to the Newark School District and the Southside School District. The Newark district merged into the Cedar Ridge School District on July 1, 2004.
