= Arkansas Highway 122 =

State highway in Arkansas, United States

Highway 122

Route information
- Maintained by ArDOT
- Length: 16.49 mi (26.54 km)

Major junctions
- West end: AR 14 near Oil Trough
- AR 69 near Newark
- North end: AR 25 in Cord

Location
- Country: United States
- State: Arkansas
- Counties: Independence

Highway system
- Arkansas Highway System; Interstate; US; State; Business; Spurs; Suffixed; Scenic; Heritage
← AR 121	→ AR 123

Arkansas Highway 122 (AR 122, Hwy. 122) is an east–west state highway in Independence County, Arkansas. The route of 16.49 miles (26.54 km) runs from Highway 14 near Oil Trough north and east through Newark to Highway 25 near Cord.

== Route description ==
AR 122 begins near Oil Trough at Highway 14. The route runs north past Akron Cemetery to intersect Highway 69 before entering Newark. Highway 112 runs as Locust Street and intersects Highway 69B (6th Street) before passing the Dearing House, which is listed on the National Register of Historic Places, and exiting town northbound. The route passes through a rural part of the county lined with trees and farms before serving as the northern terminus for Highway 37 at Cord. Less than 1 mile (1.6 km) north of this intersection, Highway 122 has a junction with Highway 25, where Highway 122 terminates.

Traffic counts from the Arkansas State Highway and Transportation Department (AHTD) reveal that approximately 1100–1800 vehicles per day (VPD) use Highway 122. These counts are entirely within this range except for the rural portion between Newark and Cord, which sees an average of 660 VPD.

== Major intersections ==
The entire route is in Independence County.

Location	mi	km	Destinations	Notes
	0.00	0.00	AR 14 – Newport, Oil Trough, Batesville	Southern terminus
	3.63	5.84	AR 69 – Batesville, Newport	
Newark	5.07	8.16	AR 69B (6th Street) – Batesville	
Cord	15.71	25.28	AR 37 south – Tuckerman	Northern terminus of AR 37
Cord	16.49	26.54	AR 25 – Strawberry, Charlotte	Northern terminus
1.000 mi = 1.609 km; 1.000 km = 0.621 mi
