= Spirit Day =

Annual LGBTQ awareness day

Spirit Day is an annual LGBTQ awareness day observed on the third Thursday in October. Started in 2010 by Canadian teenager Brittany McMillan, it was initially created in response to a rash of widely publicized bullying-related suicides of gay school students in 2010, including that of Tyler Clementi. Promoted by GLAAD, observers wear the color purple as a visible sign of support for LGBTQ youth and against bullying during National Bullying Prevention Month, as well as to honor LGBTQ victims of suicide.

== History ==
The first observance took place on Wednesday, October 20, 2010. Later observances were held on Thursday, October 20, 2011, and Friday, October 19, 2012, before the tradition of the third Thursday of October was established in 2013.

After the inaugural observance received promotion by GLAAD, many Hollywood celebrities wore purple on this day to show their support of the cause, and many websites added a prominent purple shade to their design. On Facebook, event pages created for the observance attracted more than 1.6 million users worldwide.

Further national and international attention was drawn to Spirit Day when Clint McCance, the vice-president of an Arkansas school board, posted incendiary anti-gay remarks on Facebook. McCance ultimately apologised and resigned on the CNN program Anderson Cooper 360°; however, he received further criticism for what many perceived to be an insincere non-apology apology, including from Dr. Phil in a later Anderson Cooper interview. McCance submitted his resignation letter to the Midlands School District effective November 1, 2010.

In 2016, a few years after Spirit Day became an official LGBTQ holiday, McMillan reflected saying, "It's the participants that make Spirit Day what it is; they create their own events and their own art, all in the name of showing LGBTQ young people that they care… I know how much it means to people around the world to know that they are supported by their communities." Additionally, GLAAD's VP of Programming, Zeke Stokes, shared the appreciation by saying that the words and pictures that come from a holiday like Spirit Day, illustrates the love and compassion towards the LGBTQ community, leading to youths living their authentic lives. McMillan stated that she is trying to find ways to keep Spirit Day going since the internet and social media continue to change.

== Brittany McMillan ==
Brittany McMillan was a high school student in 2010 when she started working with GLAAD to create the first ever Spirit Day. McMillan said about the event, "Ultimately, I want Spirit Day to make just one person feel a little bit better about his or herself, to feel safe enough in their own skin to be proud of who they are." McMillan has said that she took inspiration from Canada's Pink Shirt Day when creating Spirit Day's signature purple color. Since 2010, Brittany, with the help of GLAAD, has inspired many celebrities, companies, and schools to wear purple and stand up against bullying.

== Celebrity participation ==
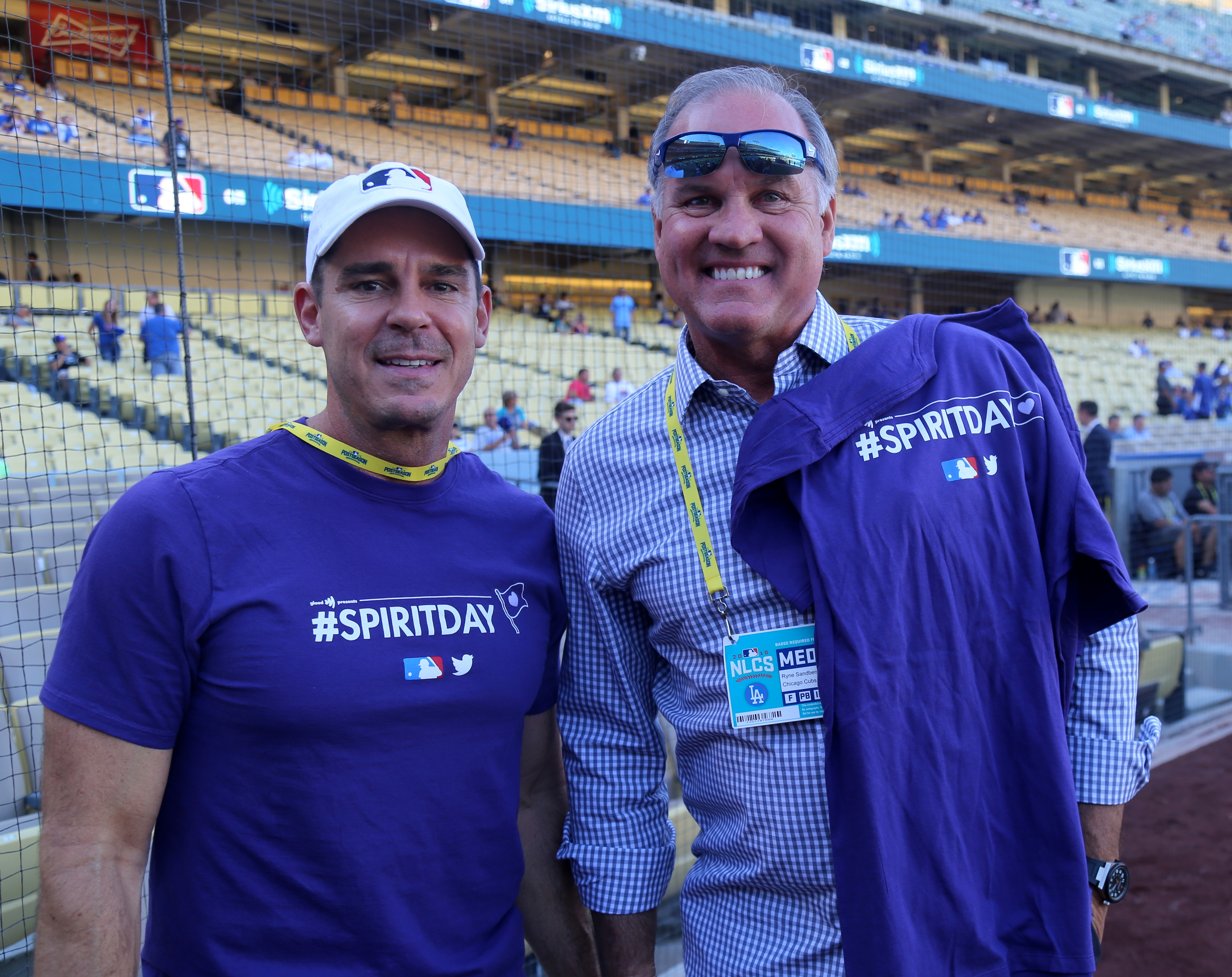
Baseball players Billy Bean and Ryne Sandberg recognising Spirit Day in 2016

Through the many celebrations that have happened since 2010, some notable celebrities include, Britney Spears, Ana Marie Cox, Vanessa Carlton, and Kristin Chenoweth.

In 2013, support grew to involve the White House, Oprah Winfrey, Ashton Kutcher, MTV, OWN, Logo, Sundance, Facebook, and others. During the 2013 holiday, "The White House tweeted using #SpiritDay and directed followers to stopbullying.gov." Additionally, many celebrities changed their social media platforms to reflect the LGBTQ holiday. American Apparel posted a separate store for Spirit Day where shoppers would receive 10% select purple items and the company would donate 10% to benefit GLAAD's work towards equality.

In 2014, Laverne Cox, a transgender actress and activist, went to New York City and hosted an event in which she helped turn the lights on that were strung on the Empire State Building. In support for Spirit Day, she said, "All of our children need to feel safe to be themselves at home, school and in our communities."

== Symbolism ==
The name "Spirit Day" comes from an association with the purple stripe of the rainbow pride flag, which represents "spirit" according to flag creator Gilbert Baker.

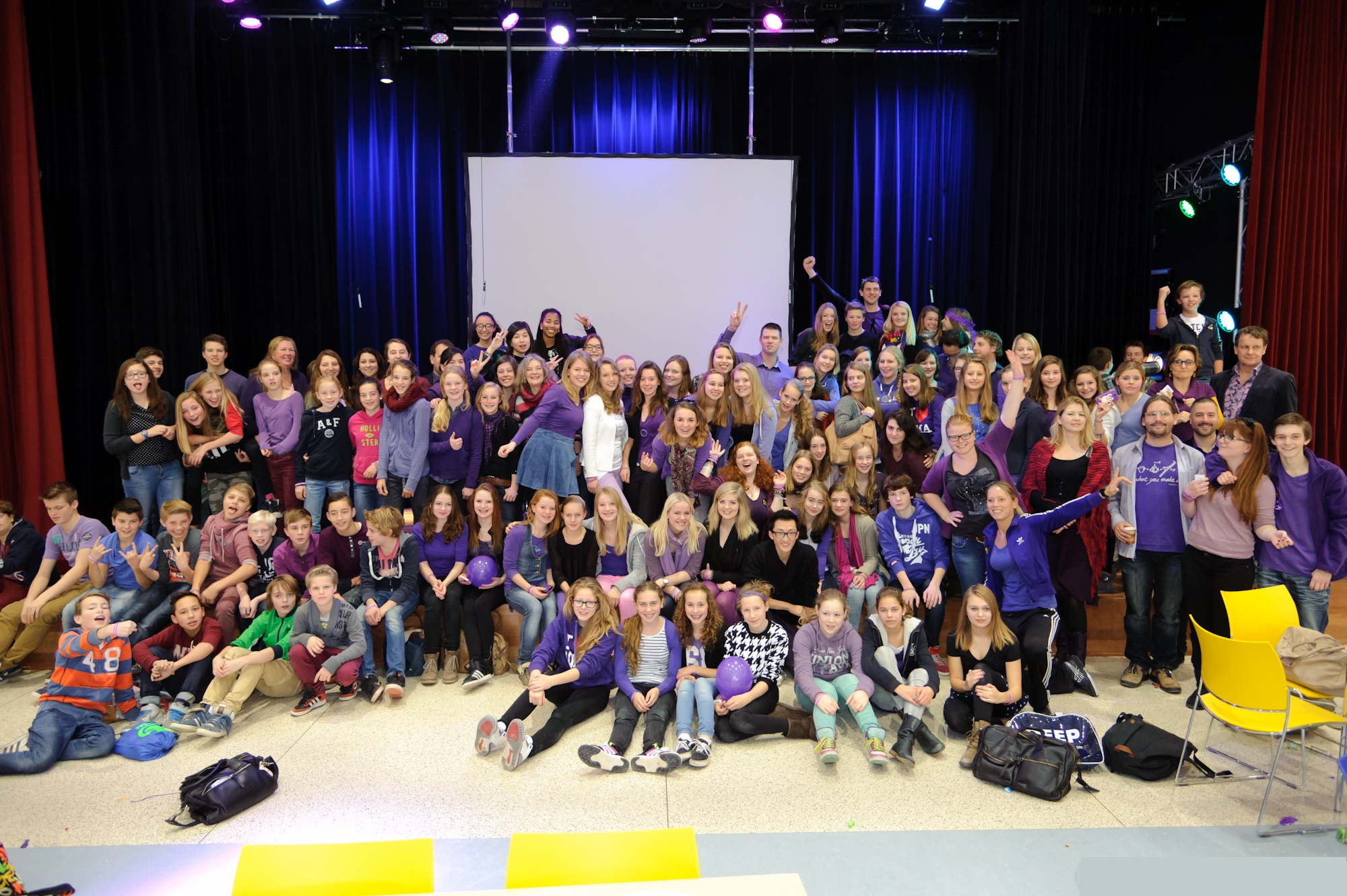
Students of Het Baarnsch Lyceum dressed in purple on Paarse Vrijdag 2013

== Variants ==
=== Netherlands ===
In December 2010, COC Nederland named the second Friday of December "Paarse Vrijdag" (Purple Friday). The Gender Sexuality Alliance Network has continued to celebrate the observance annually since then. As of 2026, "Paarse Vrijdag" (Purple Friday) happens on the second Friday of October.

== See also ==
- Bullying
- LGBTQ
- Wear it Purple Day, a similar day held in Australia.
