= Limedale =

Limedale may refer to:

- Limedale, Arkansas, an unincorporated community in Independence County
- Limedale, Indiana, an unincorporated community in Putnam County
