= Cedar Ridge High School =

Cedar Ridge High School may refer to:

- Cedar Ridge High School (Arkansas)
- Cedar Ridge High School (New Jersey)
- Cedar Ridge High School (Hillsborough, North Carolina)
- Cedar Ridge High School (Round Rock, Texas)
