= Floral, Arkansas =

- Census-designated place
- Location within Arkansas Location within the United States
- Coordinates: 35°35′20″N 91°45′32″W
- Country: United States
- State: Arkansas
- County: Independence
- Elevation: 768 ft (234 m)

Population (2020)
  - Total: 109
- Time zone: UTC-6 (Central (CST))
  - Summer (DST): UTC-5 (CDT)
- ZIP code: 72534
- Area code: Area code 501
- GNIS feature ID: 2805643

Floral is an unincorporated community and census-designated place (CDP) in Independence County, Arkansas, United States. It was first listed as a CDP in the 2020 census with a population of 109. Floral is located on Arkansas Highway 87, 8 miles (13 km) west-northwest of Pleasant Plains. Floral has a post office with ZIP code 72534.

== Education ==
Since the 1985–86 school year, public education for elementary and secondary students has been provided by the Midland School District, which includes Midland Elementary School, which is located in Floral, and Midland High School, based in Pleasant Plains. Midland formed as a result of consolidation of the former Pleasant Plains and Floral school districts. The consolidation of the Pleasant Plains School District and the Floral School District was effective on July 1, 1985.

== Demographics ==
Historical population
Census	Pop.	Note	%±
2020	109		—
U.S. Decennial Census; 2020

=== 2020 census ===
Floral CDP, Arkansas – Demographic Profile (NH = Non-Hispanic) Note: the US Census treats Hispanic/Latino as an ethnic category. This table excludes Latinos from the racial categories and assigns them to a separate category. Hispanics/Latinos may be of any race.
Race / Ethnicity	Pop 2020	% 2020
White alone (NH)	106	97.25%
Black or African American alone (NH)	0	0.00%
Native American or Alaska Native alone (NH)	0	0.00%
Asian alone (NH)	0	0.00%
Pacific Islander alone (NH)	0	0.00%
Some Other Race alone (NH)	0	0.00%
Mixed Race/Multi-Racial (NH)	2	1.83%
Hispanic or Latino (any race)	1	0.92%
Total	109	100.00%
