= Goff Petroglyph Site =

Archaeological site in Arkansas, United States

- U.S. National Register of Historic Places
- Nearest city: Salado, Arkansas
- Area: 0.1 acres (0.040 ha)
- MPS: Rock Art Sites in Arkansas TR
- NRHP reference No.: 82002117
- Added to NRHP: May 4, 1982

The Goff Petroglyph Site is a rock art site in Independence County, Arkansas, in the general vicinity of Salado. The site has been known since the 19th century, and was first described by amateurs in 1937, but was not formally examined by archaeologists until 1979. The petroglyph panels depict a number of things, including animal tracks, the sun, and spirals, circles, and subdivided squares, and are estimated to date to about 1500 CE.

The site was listed on the National Register of Historic Places in 1982.

== See also ==
- National Register of Historic Places listings in Independence County, Arkansas
