= Salado, Arkansas =

- Census-designated place
- Location within Arkansas Location within the United States
- Coordinates: 35°41′43″N 91°35′32″W
- Country: United States
- State: Arkansas
- County: Independence
- Elevation: 449 ft (137 m)

Population (2020)
  - Total: 472
- Time zone: UTC-6 (Central (CST))
  - Summer (DST): UTC-5 (CDT)
- GNIS feature ID: 2805683

Salado is an unincorporated area and census-designated place (CDP) in Independence County, Arkansas, United States. It was first listed as a CDP in the 2020 census with a population of 472.

The Goff Petroglyph Site is located here.

The spur route of Arkansas Highway 14 connects Salado with Southside.

== Demographics ==
Historical population
Census	Pop.	Note	%±
2020	472		—
U.S. Decennial Census; 2020

=== 2020 census ===
Salado CDP, Arkansas – Demographic Profile (NH = Non-Hispanic) Note: the US Census treats Hispanic/Latino as an ethnic category. This table excludes Latinos from the racial categories and assigns them to a separate category. Hispanics/Latinos may be of any race.
Race / Ethnicity	Pop 2020	% 2020
White alone (NH)	404	85.59%
Black or African American alone (NH)	5	1.06%
Native American or Alaska Native alone (NH)	1	0.21%
Asian alone (NH)	2	0.42%
Pacific Islander alone (NH)	0	0.00%
Some Other Race alone (NH)	1	0.21%
Mixed Race/Multi-Racial (NH)	29	6.14%
Hispanic or Latino (any race)	30	6.36%
Total	472	100.00%

== Education ==
It is in the Southside School District. Southside High School is the sole comprehensive high school of the Southside district.
