= Hulsey Bend School =

- U.S. National Register of Historic Places
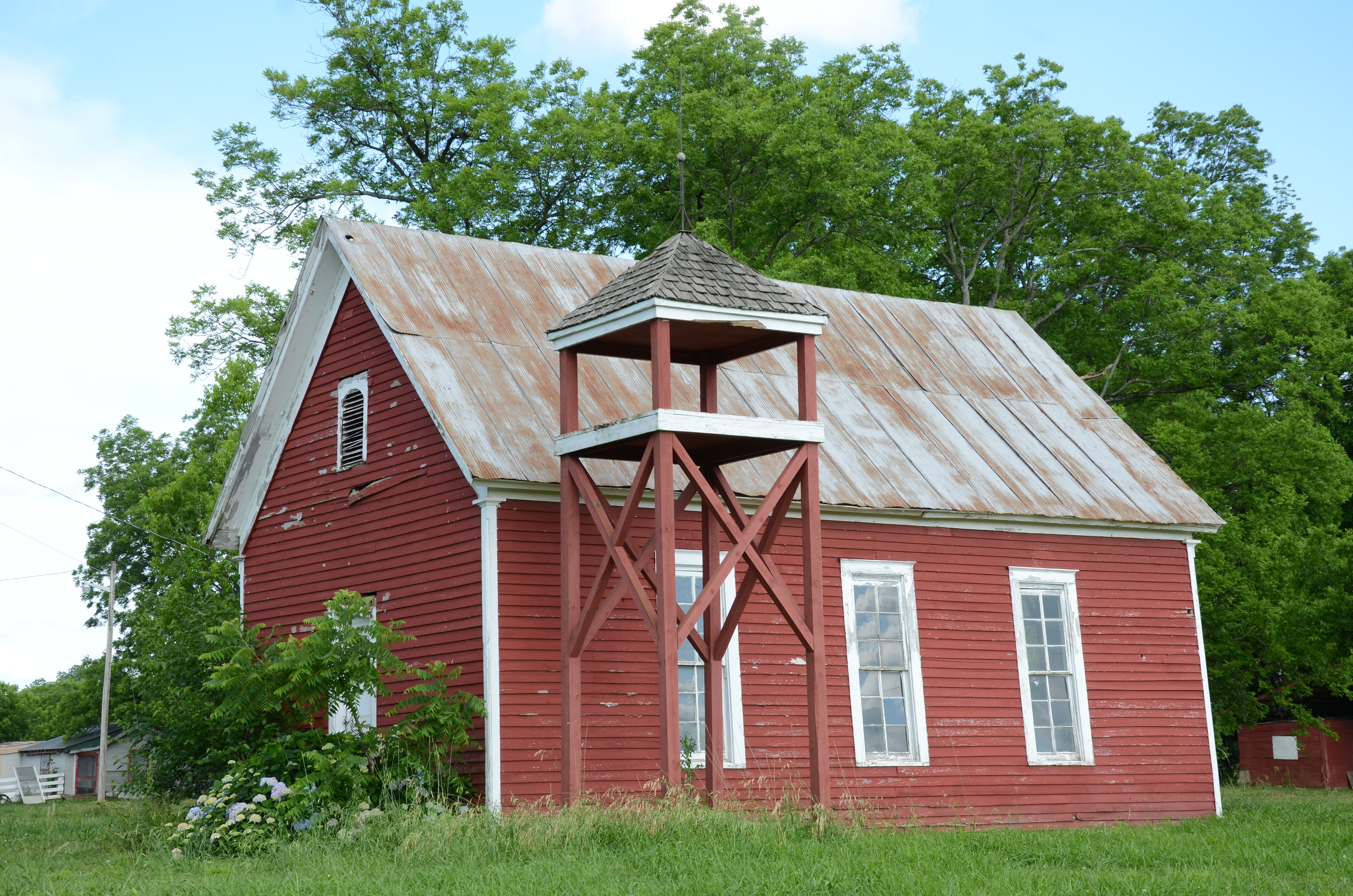

- Location within Arkansas Location within the United States
- Nearest city: Oil Trough, Arkansas
- Coordinates: 35°38′7″N 91°25′5″W
- Area: less than one acre
- Built: 1900
- Architectural style: one-room school
- NRHP reference No.: 99000153
- Added to NRHP: February 12, 1999

The Hulsey Bend School is a historic one-room schoolhouse building in rural southeastern Independence County, Arkansas. It is located east of Oil Trough on Freeze Bend Road, about 0.7 miles (1.1 km) north of Arkansas Highway 14. It is a single-story wood-frame structure, with a gable roof and weatherboard siding. The gabled ends each have an entrance, while the sides each have three windows. Built c. 1900, it is the best-preserved district schoolhouse in the Oil Trough area and believed to be the last in the county; it was used as a school until 1947.

The building was listed on the National Register of Historic Places in 1999.

== See also ==
- National Register of Historic Places listings in Independence County, Arkansas
