= Magness, Arkansas =

- Town
- Location of Magness in Independence County, Arkansas
- Coordinates: 35°42′11″N 91°28′56″W
- Country: United States
- State: Arkansas
- County: Independence

Area
  - Total: 0.61 sq mi (1.59 km^{2})
  - Land: 0.61 sq mi (1.59 km^{2})
  - Water: 0 sq mi (0.00 km^{2})
- Elevation: 266 ft (81 m)

Population (2020)
  - Total: 220
  - Estimate (2025): 221 ▲
  - Density: 358.0/sq mi (138.23/km^{2})
- Time zone: UTC-6 (Central (CST))
  - Summer (DST): UTC-5 (CDT)
- ZIP code: 72553
- Area code: 870
- FIPS code: 05-43370
- GNIS feature ID: 2406077

Magness is a town in Independence County, Arkansas, United States. As of the 2020 census, Magness had a population of 220.

== Geography ==
Magness is located in eastern Independence County.

According to the United States Census Bureau, Magness has an area of 0.58 square miles (1.5 km^{2}), all land. The town is named after a family, or one of its members (probably Colonel Morgan Magness), who was prominent in Independence County before the Civil War. They were the largest slaveholding family in the county, but since Independence County, located in the mountains, had few slaves, the Magnesses had less than 20.

=== Transportation ===
Arkansas Highway 69 passes through the town, leading east 2 miles (3 km) to Newark and north 3 miles (5 km) to Sulphur Rock. Batesville, the county seat, is 12 miles (19 km) to the northwest via Highway 69.

- Arkansas Highway 69

== Demographics ==
Historical population
Census	Pop.	Note	%±
1910	216		—
1920	199		−7.9%
1930	179		−10.1%
1940	226		26.3%
1950	229		1.3%
1960	140		−38.9%
1970	139		−0.7%
1980	196		41.0%
1990	158		−19.4%
2000	191		20.9%
2010	202		5.8%
2020	220		8.9%
2025 (est.)	221	▲	0.5%
U.S. Decennial Census

As of the census of 2000, there were 191 people, 82 households, and 55 families residing in the town. The population density was 129.4 people/km^{2} (335 people/mi^{2}). There were 91 housing units at an average density of 61.6 units/km^{2} (160 units/mi^{2}). The racial makeup of the town was 98.95% White, and 1.05% from two or more races. 0.52% of the population were Hispanic or Latino of any race.

There were 82 households, out of which 28.0% had children under the age of 18 living with them, 52.4% were married couples living together, 9.8% had a female householder with no husband present, and 32.9% were non-families. 29.3% of all households were made up of individuals, and 17.1% had someone living alone who was 65 years of age or older. The average household size was 2.33 and the average family size was 2.89.

In the town, the population was spread out, with 24.6% under the age of 18, 5.2% from 18 to 24, 22.5% from 25 to 44, 24.6% from 45 to 64, and 23.0% who were 65 years of age or older. The median age was 43 years. For every 100 females, there were 91.0 males. For every 100 females age 18 and over, there were 94.6 males.

The median income for a household in the town was $27,969, and the median income for a family was $35,000. Males had a median income of $27,750 versus $16,058 for females. The per capita income for the town was $24,967. About 14.3% of families and 22.6% of the population were below the poverty line, including 23.1% of those under the age of eighteen and 32.7% of those 65 or over.

== Education ==
It is in the Cedar Ridge School District.
