= Dearing House =

Dearing House may refer to:

- Dearing House (Newark, Arkansas), listed on the NRHP in Arkansas
- Albin P. Dearing House, Athens, GA, listed on the NRHP in Georgia
