= Austin Reaves =

American basketball player (born 1998)

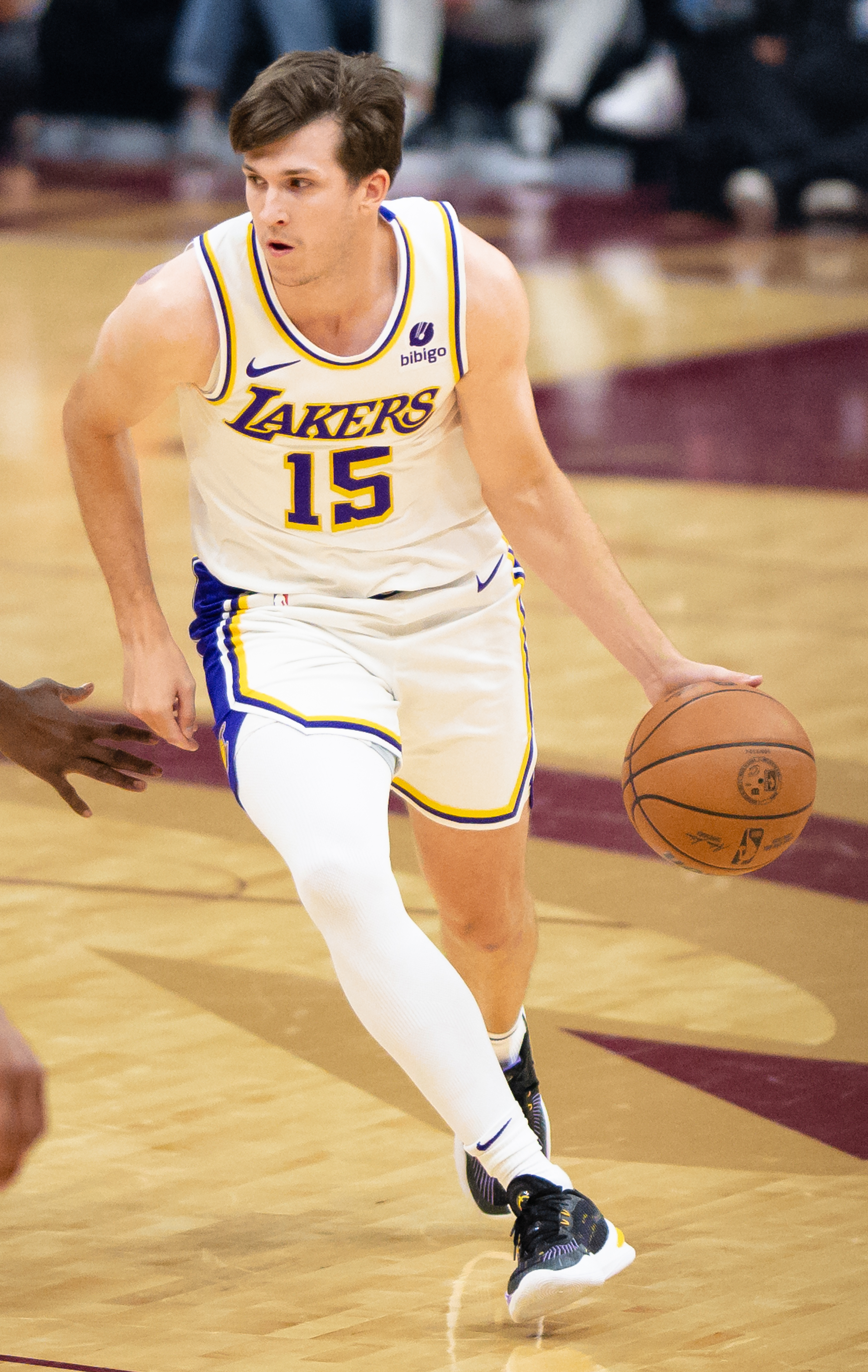
- Reaves with the Los Angeles Lakers in 2023

No. 15 – Los Angeles Lakers
- Position: Shooting guard
- League: NBA

Personal information
- Born: May 29, 1998 (age 28) Newark, Arkansas, U.S.
- Listed height: 6 ft 5 in (1.96 m)
- Listed weight: 197 lb (89 kg)

Career information
- High school: Cedar Ridge (Newark, Arkansas)
- College: Wichita State (2016–2018); Oklahoma (2019–2021)
- NBA draft: 2021: undrafted
- Playing career: 2021–present

Career history
- 2021–present: Los Angeles Lakers

Career highlights
- NBA Cup champion (2023); First-team All-Big 12 (2021); Big 12 All-Newcomer Team (2020)
- Stats at NBA.com
- Stats at Basketball Reference

Austin Tyler Reaves (born May 29, 1998) is an American professional basketball player for the Los Angeles Lakers of the National Basketball Association (NBA). He played college basketball for the Wichita State Shockers and the Oklahoma Sooners. Reaves joined the Lakers as an undrafted free agent.

== Early life ==
Reaves attended Cedar Ridge High School in Newark, Arkansas. He won back-to-back Class 2A state titles in his first two years. Reaves scored 73 points in a triple-overtime win over Forrest City High School. As a senior, he averaged 32.5 points, 8.8 rebounds and 5.1 assists per game, leading his team to a Class 3A state title. Reaves was named MVP of the state tournament after averaging 43.3 points through four games. He was a two-time Class 3A All-State selection. On January 20, 2016, he committed to playing college basketball for Wichita State over offers from South Dakota State and Arkansas State.

His older brother, Spencer, plays basketball in the top German team in EuroBasket.

== College career ==
=== Wichita State ===
Entering his freshman season at Wichita State, Reaves underwent surgery to repair a torn labrum in his left shoulder. He had been playing through the injury since his junior year of high school. As a freshman, he averaged 4.1 points per game in a reserve role. After the season, Reaves underwent surgery to repair a torn labrum in his right shoulder, which had dislocated three times during his college career, causing him to miss games. On January 28, 2018, he posted a sophomore season-high 23 points and four assists in a 90–71 win over Tulsa. Reaves made seven three-pointers in the first half, the most in a half in program history. As a sophomore, he averaged 8.1 points and 3.1 rebounds per game, shooting 42.5 percent from three-point range.

=== Oklahoma ===
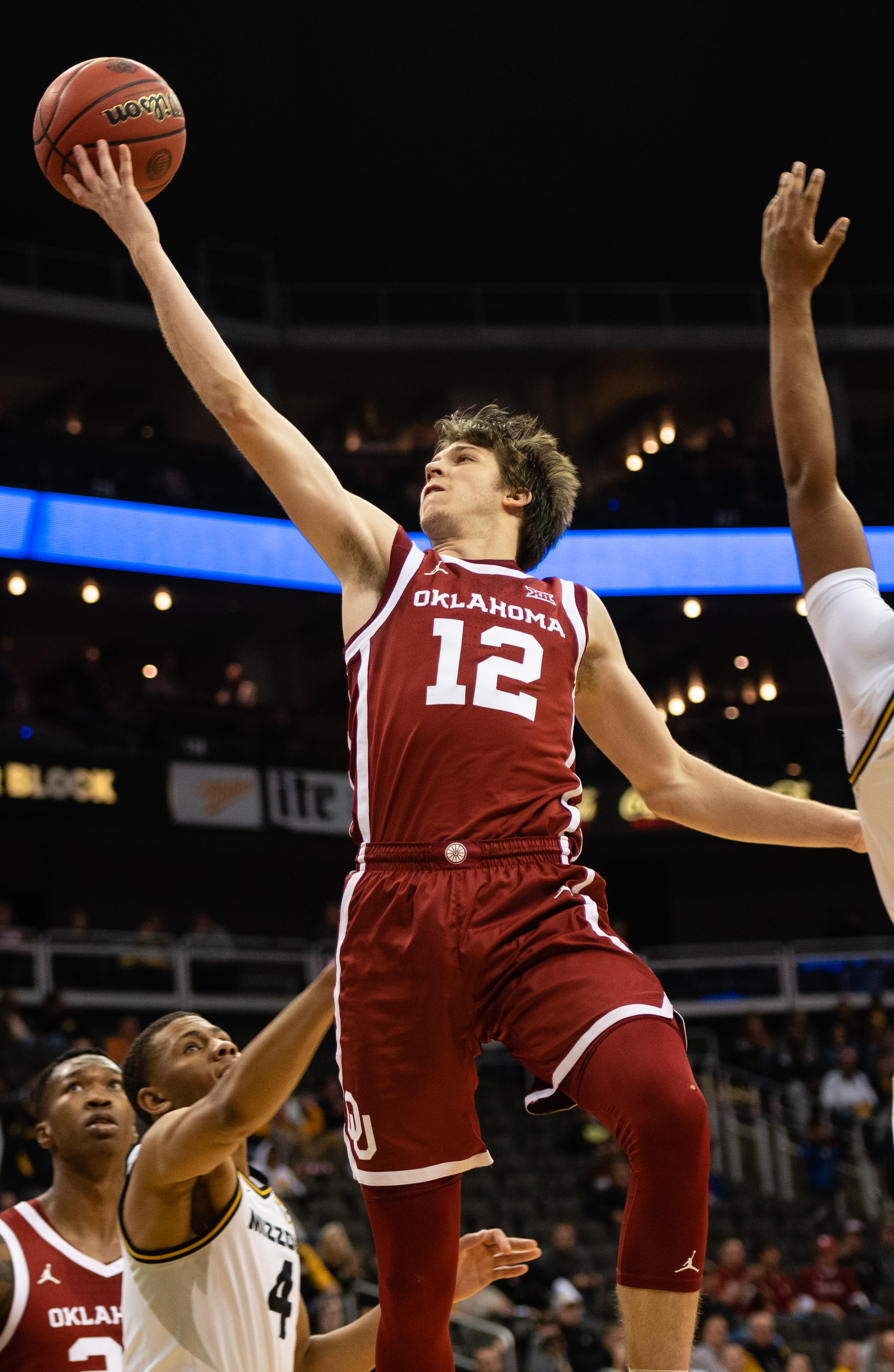
Reaves at Oklahoma in 2019

After his sophomore season, Reaves transferred to Oklahoma and sat out the following season due to NCAA transfer rules. During his redshirt year, he weight trained and gained 20 pounds (9 kg). On March 7, 2020, Reaves recorded a career-high 41 points, six assists and five rebounds in a 78–76 win over TCU. He led a 19-point second-half comeback and made the game-winning shot with 0.5 seconds remaining. As a redshirt junior, Reaves averaged 14.7 points, 5.3 rebounds and three assists per game and was named to the Big 12 All-Newcomer Team. On December 6, 2020, he posted a senior season-high 32 points, nine assists and six rebounds in an 82–78 win against TCU. In the second round of the NCAA tournament, Reaves scored 27 points in an 87–71 loss to top-seeded Gonzaga. As a senior, he averaged 18.4 points, 5.5 rebounds and 4.6 assists per game, earning first-team All-Big 12 honors. On March 31, Reaves declared for the 2021 NBA draft, forgoing his remaining college eligibility.

== Professional career ==
=== 2021–22 season ===
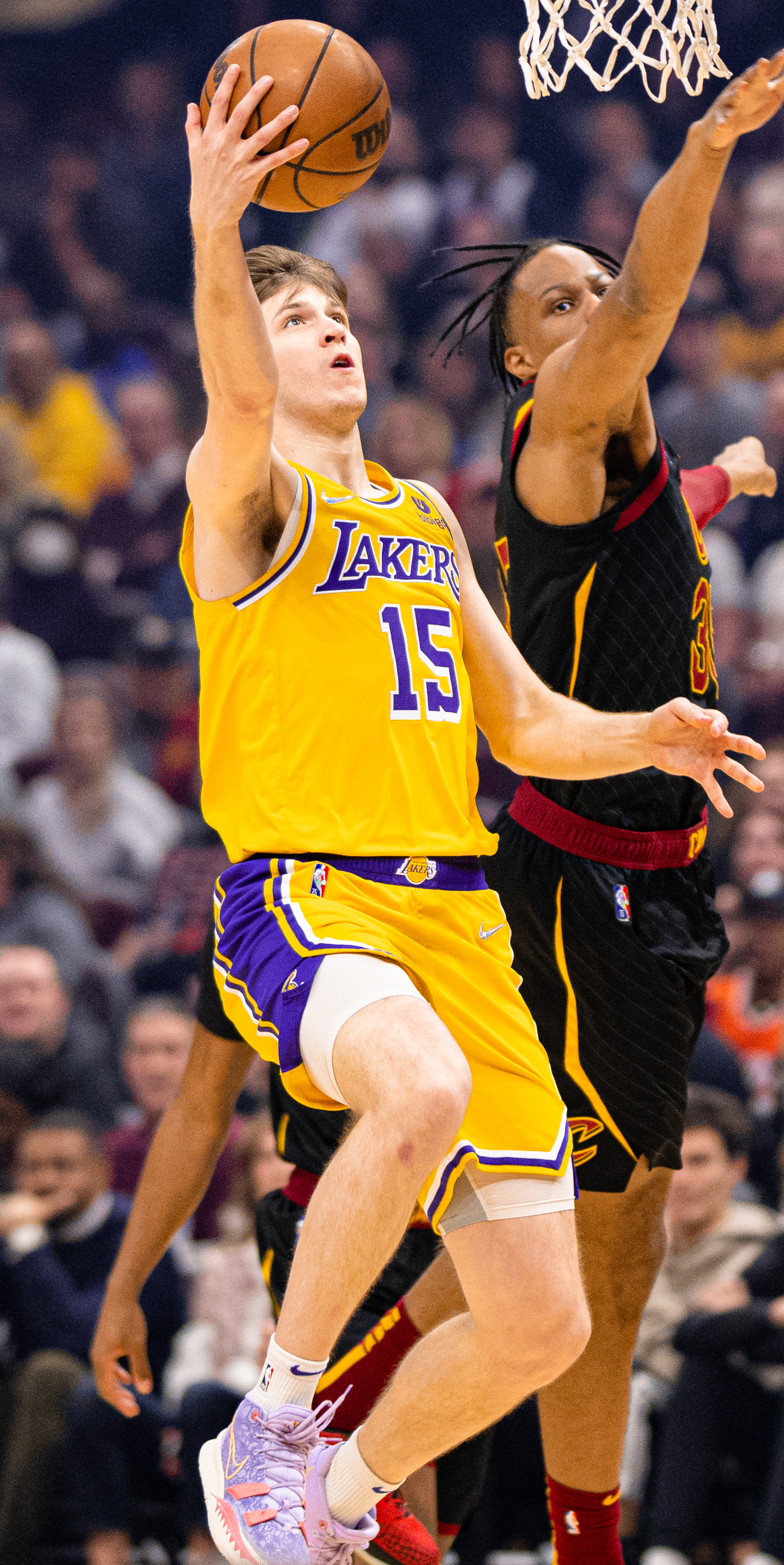
Reaves shoots a layup over Isaac Okoro in 2022.

Reaves went undrafted in the 2021 NBA draft. He said he declined to be selected 42nd overall by the Detroit Pistons, opting instead to sign a two-way contract with the Los Angeles Lakers on August 3, 2021. On September 27, he was signed to a standard NBA contract. On October 22, Reaves made his NBA debut, scoring eight points off the bench in a 115–105 loss to the Phoenix Suns. On December 15, he scored 15 points, on 5-of-6 shooting from three, grabbed seven rebounds and hit a game-winning three-pointer in a 107–104 victory over the Dallas Mavericks. During the Lakers' season finale on April 10, 2022, in a 146–141 overtime win over the Denver Nuggets, Reaves notched the first triple-double of his career, and put up career highs in rebounds, and previously assists, with 16 rebounds and 10 assists along with 31 points in 42 minutes.

=== 2022–23 season ===
On March 19, 2023, Reaves scored a then-career-high 35 points with six rebounds and six assists off the bench in a 111–105 win against the Orlando Magic, in which he scored the final 10 points for the Lakers. On April 16, in game 1 of the first-round playoff series against the Memphis Grizzlies, the first NBA playoff game of his career, he scored 23 points in a 128–112 win. He matched that performance in game 4 of the same series, leading the Lakers in scoring in a 117–111 overtime victory. His successful rookie year led to him receiving the nicknames "Hillbilly Kobe", "White Kobe" and "AR-15", although Reaves himself publicly expressed dislike for such nicknames.

=== 2023–24 season ===
On July 6, 2023, Reaves re-signed with the Los Angeles Lakers on a four-year, $54 million contract. He started the first eight games of the 2023–24 season for a streak of 34 consecutive starts, dating back to the 2022–23 regular season and playoffs, before coming off the bench for 15 points and seven assists against the Suns in the Lakers' first road win of the season.

On December 9, 2023, Reaves and the Lakers won the inaugural season of the NBA In-Season Tournament. Reaves scored 28 points off the bench in the championship game against Indiana.

On January 31, 2024, Reaves put up a then season-high 28 points along with six assists and two steals in a 138–122 loss to the Atlanta Hawks. In his next game, on February 1, 2024, he put up 32 points on a career-high seven three-pointers made in a 114–105 win over the Boston Celtics. In his next game on February 3, his first at Madison Square Garden, Reaves provided 22 points, six rebounds, seven assists and two blocks as the Lakers beat the New York Knicks 113–105, including four free throws down the stretch. Playing without LeBron James on March 26 against the Milwaukee Bucks, Reaves had a triple-double with 29 points, 14 rebounds and 10 assists in a 128–124 road win in double overtime.

=== 2024–25 season ===
On December 25, 2024, Reaves scored the game-winning layup and finished with a triple-double of 26 points, 10 rebounds and 10 assists in a 115–113 win over the Golden State Warriors. On December 28, Reaves put up a career-high 16 assists in a 132–122 win over the Sacramento Kings. On January 17, 2025, Reaves scored a then career-high 38 points in a 102–101 win over the Brooklyn Nets. Reaves later broke this record on February 8, scoring 45 points in a 124–117 win over the Indiana Pacers. With that performance, Reaves became the fourth Laker in the last twenty years to score at least 45 points, joining Kobe Bryant, LeBron James and Anthony Davis. Further, Reaves is only the sixth Laker ever to score a statline of 45 points, 7 rebounds and 7 assists.

On April 3, 2025, Reaves had 31 points, 6 rebounds and 3 assists in a game against the Golden State Warriors. Reaves made 9 3-pointers, with a majority of them coming in the 4th quarter. Reaves also passed Lakers great Kobe Bryant for the second-most three-point field goals in a season in Lakers history.

=== 2025–26 season ===
On October 26, 2025, Reaves had a near-triple-double of 51 points, 11 rebounds and 9 assists in a 127–120 win over the Sacramento Kings. His 51 points set a career high, and he became the eighth Laker to score 20-plus free throws in a single game. He also made his 500th three-pointer of his career. On October 29, Reaves scored a game-winning, buzzer-beating floater and finished with 28 points and a career-high-tying 16 assists in a 116–115 victory against the Minnesota Timberwolves.

=== 2026–27 season ===
On June 24, 2026, Reaves signed a four-year, $185 million max deal with the Lakers, which made Reaves have the richest contract in NBA history for an undrafted player.

== National team career ==
Reaves was selected to play on the 2023 U.S. national team for the FIBA World Cup. He was only the third undrafted NBA player on a U.S. national team, following Ben Wallace (2002) and Brad Miller (2006).

== Career statistics ==
Legend
GP	Games played	GS	Games started	MPG	Minutes per game
FG%	Field goal percentage	3P%	3-point field goal percentage	FT%	Free throw percentage
RPG	Rebounds per game	APG	Assists per game	SPG	Steals per game
BPG	Blocks per game	PPG	Points per game	**Bold**	Career high

=== NBA ===
==== Regular season ====
Year	Team	GP	GS	MPG	FG%	3P%	FT%	RPG	APG	SPG	BPG	PPG
2021–22	L.A. Lakers	61	19	23.2	.459	.317	.839	3.2	1.8	.5	.3	7.3
2022–23	L.A. Lakers	64	22	28.8	**.529**	**.398**	.864	3.0	3.4	.5	.3	13.0
2023–24	L.A. Lakers	**82**	57	32.1	.486	.367	.853	4.3	5.5	.8	.3	15.9
2024–25	L.A. Lakers	73	**73**	**34.9**	.460	.377	**.877**	4.5	**5.8**	**1.1**	.3	20.2
2025–26	L.A. Lakers	51	45	34.5	.490	.360	.871	**4.7**	5.5	**1.1**	**.4**	**23.3**
Career		331	216	30.8	.483	.368	.865	3.9	4.5	.8	.3	15.8

==== Playoffs ====
Year	Team	GP	GS	MPG	FG%	3P%	FT%	RPG	APG	SPG	BPG	PPG
2023	L.A. Lakers	**16**	**16**	36.2	.464	**.443**	**.895**	4.4	4.6	.6	.2	16.9
2024	L.A. Lakers	5	5	34.8	**.476**	.269	**.895**	3.8	3.6	**1.4**	.6	16.8
2025	L.A. Lakers	5	5	**39.2**	.411	.319	.857	**5.4**	3.6	.2	.6	16.2
2026	L.A. Lakers	6	5	36.8	.407	.257	.860	4.0	**5.8**	.0	**1.2**	**20.0**
Career		32	31	36.6	.444	.357	.881	4.4	4.5	.6	.5	17.3

=== College ===
Year	Team	GP	GS	MPG	FG%	3P%	FT%	RPG	APG	SPG	BPG	PPG
2016–17	Wichita State	**33**	0	11.8	.448	**.509**	.757	1.8	1.1	.4	**.3**	4.1
2017–18	Wichita State	**33**	11	21.5	**.450**	.425	.827	3.1	2.0	.5	.2	8.1
2018–19	Oklahoma	Redshirt										
2019–20	Oklahoma	31	**31**	33.2	.381	.259	.848	5.3	3.0	**1.0**	**.3**	14.7
2020–21	Oklahoma	25	25	**34.5**	.443	.305	**.865**	**5.5**	**4.6**	.9	**.3**	**18.3**
Career		122	67	24.5	.421	.347	.844	3.8	2.6	.7	.3	10.8

== Off the court ==
=== Personal life ===
Reaves grew up a Los Angeles Lakers fan.

Reaves is the son of Nicole Wilkett and Brian Reaves. Both of his parents played college basketball for Arkansas State. His mother averaged 21.3 points per game and earned all-conference honors as a senior, while his father tied for third in program history with 384 career assists. Reaves' brother, Spencer, played college basketball for North Greenville and Central Missouri before embarking on a professional career with Juaristi ISB in Spain. As of 2023–24, Spencer is with Rasta Vechta in Germany. Reaves credits his brother for sparking his interest in basketball.

Reaves' grandmother is German, which allowed him to obtain a German passport in 2022. In 2023, he expressed interest in playing for Germany's national team, but later joined the 2023 U.S. World Cup team.

=== Endorsements ===
In March 2023, Reaves signed a signature shoe deal with Chinese sports apparel brand Rigorer, whose shoes he wore through the 2022–23 season. The first shoe named "AR1" was released in August 2023 via sneaker marketplace Kicks Crew.

== See also ==
- List of NBA career free throw percentage leaders
