= Cord, Arkansas =

- Unincorporated community
- Location within Arkansas Location within the United States
- Coordinates: 35°48′43″N 91°20′36″W
- Country: United States
- State: Arkansas
- County: Independence
- Elevation: 335 ft (102 m)
- Time zone: UTC-6 (Central (CST))
  - Summer (DST): UTC-5 (CDT)
- ZIP code: 72524
- Area code: 870
- GNIS feature ID: 48039

Cord is an unincorporated community in Independence County, Arkansas, United States. Cord is located at the junction of Arkansas highways 37 and 122, 9.5 miles (15.3 km) northeast of Newark. Cord has a post office with ZIP code 72524.

Cord is served by Cedar Ridge School District. It was formed on July 1, 2004, from the consolidation of the Cord Charlotte School District and the Newark School District.
