= Southside Charter High School =

Location
- 70 Scott Drive; Southside, Arkansas, Arkansas 72501; United States; 35°41′59″N 91°37′36″W

Information
- School type: Public, Comprehensive
- Status: Open
- School district: Southside School District
- NCES District ID: 0512540
- Oversight: Arkansas Department of Education (ADE)
- CEEB code: 040120
- NCES School ID: 051254001012
- Teaching staff: 63.50 (on FTE basis)
- Grades: 10–12
- Enrollment: 444 (2023–2024)
  - Grade 10: 159
  - Grade 11: 168
  - Grade 12: 117
- Student to teacher ratio: 6.99
- Education system: ADE Smart Core curriculum
- Classes offered: Regular, Advanced Placement
- Campus type: Rural
- Colors: Navy and Vegas gold
- Athletics conference: 4A Region 2 (2012-14)
- Mascot: Southerner
- Team name: Southside Southerners
- Accreditation: ADE; AdvancED (1992–)
- Affiliation: Arkansas Activities Association (AAA)
- Website: www.southsideschools.org/o/schs

Southside Charter High School, also known as Southside High School, is an accredited comprehensive public secondary school for students in grades 10 through 12, located in the city of Southside, a city in Independence County, Arkansas. The school is the sole high school managed by the Southside School District. The school is sometimes referenced as Southside Batesville to distinguish itself from the Fort Smith Southside High School and South Side (Bee Branch) High School.

== History ==
Southside High School was founded in 1949.

In 2012, Southside High School was nationally recognized as a bronze medalist in the Best High Schools report developed by the U.S. News & World Report.

In 2015, Southside High School became a charter high school. Students can now take college courses before they graduate.

== Academics ==
Southside High School is a Title I school fully accredited by the ADE and has been accredited by AdvancED since 1992. The assumed course of study for students follows the Smart Core curriculum developed by the Arkansas Department of Education (ADE), which requires students to complete at least 22 units to graduate. Students engage in regular courses and exams and may take Advanced Placement (AP) coursework and exams with the opportunity for college credit. Southside students may also engage in its EAST Initiative programs.

== Athletics ==
The Southside High School athletic emblem is the Southerner with Navy blue and Vegas gold serving as the school colors.

The Southside Southerners are members of the 5A Classification administered by the Arkansas Activities Association competing in the 4A Region 2 Conference for interscholastic sporting activities. The Southerners participation includes: football, volleyball, golf (boys/girls), basketball (boys/girls), baseball, softball, track and field (boys/girls), soccer (boys/girls), bowling (boys/girls), tennis (boys/girls), dance, and cheerleading.

== Notable people ==
The following are notable people associated with Southside High School. If the person was a Southside High School student, the number in parentheses indicates the year of graduation; if the person was a faculty or staff member, that person's title and years of association are included.

- James Sturch (2009)
- Leslie Rutledge (1994)
