= Kicks Crew =

Fashion resell company

- Industry: Retail
- Founded: 2008
- Headquarters: New York City
- Key people: Johnny Mak (CEO); Ross Adrian Yip (COO)
- Website: kickscrew.com

Kicks Crew (stylized KICKS CREW) is a New York City-based global digital marketplace for footwear, clothing, and accessories, primarily focusing on sneakers.

They operate a B2B2C model offering a digital platform for resale only to brands and retailers, which means that the products sold on their website and mobile app consist of exclusive launches, overstock, and excess inventory rather than being sourced second-hand. This is aimed at avoiding some of the authenticity challenges of the C2B2C marketplace model.

The website stocks over 400,000 products from all major sportswear brands and a wide range of other apparel and footwear companies including a number of emerging brands from Asia.

== History ==
Kicks Crew was launched in 2008 by Johnny Mak, who took the role of CEO, and Ross Adrian Yip, a former business development director at Los Angeles-based online sneaker marketplace GOAT Group, who acts as COO. Initially, the company operated across a number of third-party platforms such as Amazon, eBay, Tmall, and JD.com. As their following grew, the focus shifted to a direct-to-consumer model in 2021.

In November 2022 the company announced a close of $7.2 million in Series A funding led by Gobi Partners and Pacific Century Group, which also included an investment from Milwaukee Bucks point guard Damian Lillard.

Lillard also became the company's first "Crew Athlete", which sees him working with Kicks Crew on curated sneaker releases, website content, and giveback events. The first such event took place in October 2022 in Lillard's hometown of Oakland, California, where he drove a Kicks Crew branded ice cream truck to Brookfield Park to hand out free pairs of sneakers. In June 2023, Lillard coached high school students in gyms across lower-income areas of Hong Kong's Kowloon district.

In 2023 Chinese sneaker brand Rigorer launched NBA star Austin Reaves' first signature sneaker, the AR1, in multiple colorways exclusively on Kicks Crew. The first two releases included the debut titled, "Ice Cream" and a "Stars & Stripes" variant as a tribute to Team USA's legacy. The partnership was expanded in October 2023 with the release of a Los Angeles Lakers-inspired colorway to celebrate Reeves’ four-year max contract signing. and November 2023 restocks of the debut launches.

In December 2023 Dallas Mavericks point guard Kyrie Irving made an investment in Kicks Crew and announced that he would join the company in the role of Chief Community Officer. In July 2024 NBA Rookie Jamal Shead announced that he had signed an endorsement deal with Kicks Crew, the first of its kind for both parties. Not long after, in October 2024, the company added Brooklyn Nets guard Cam Thomas as brand ambassador.

In June 2025 Basketball Hall of Famer Dwyane Wade and NBA All-Star D'Angelo Russell become investors and brand ambassadors for the company. The two have been partners in the sneaker space for several years via a partnership with Li-Ning and Way of Wade. To launch off their partnership, Wade and Russell hosted Way of Wade x Kicks Crew exhibit at Fanatics Fest NYC.

== Support for community, culture, & sport ==
The company hosted or supported a number of community events and activities:

- To launch their 2025 partnership with Dwyane Wade and D'Angelo Russell, the company hosted a Way of Wade x Kicks Crew exhibit at Fanatics Fest NYC and an immersive booth celebrating the legacy of Way of Wade.
- In July 2026, they invited NBA Champion Giannis Antetokounmpo and his brothers, the AntetokounBros, to Hong Kong and Mainland China for a series of basketball-themed community events that focused on mentorship, and youth development.
- In August 2026, the company was a partner to Dwyane Wade Day in Robbins, Illinois, a community day of sport and celebration for the renaming of Claire Boulevard to Dwyane Wade Boulevard. Founder Ross Yip took part in the event's Community Chat panel alongside Wade, his father Dwyane Wade Sr., and Robbins Mayor Darren Bryant to discuss mentorship and opportunity.

== See also ==
- StockX
- GOAT (platform)
- Stadium Goods
