= Cord-Charlotte School District =

Defunct school district in Arkansas, United States

Cord-Charlotte School District was a school district headquartered in unincorporated Independence County, Arkansas, serving Charlotte and Cord. It had separate elementary school and high school divisions. The school mascot was the Indian (Native American).

The previous school building was demolished on May 6, 1936. In 1937 the historic Cord-Charlotte School was built by Works Progress Administration (WPA) employees; they were used to deal with area unemployment. In the 1950s new school building were constructed, although the historic building remained as one of the school buildings. It became a storage facility by 2001.

Cord-Charlotte High School closed in 2003 as part of the Equal Educational Opportunity act (Act 60) consolidations. The district merged with the Newark School District on July 1, 2004, forming the Cedar Ridge School District. The elementary school remains open, as part of the new Cedar Ridge district.
