= Midland High School (Arkansas) =

Location
- 741 Main Street; Pleasant Plains, Arkansas 72568; United States
- Coordinates: 35°32′50″N 91°37′29″W

Information
- School type: Public comprehensive
- Status: Open
- School district: Midland School District
- CEEB code: 042060
- NCES School ID: 050002001298
- Principal: Edwin Buttersworth
- Teaching staff: 49.06 (on FTE basis)
- Grades: 7–12
- Enrollment: 240 (2023-2024)
- Student to teacher ratio: 4.89
- Education system: ADE Smart Core
- Classes offered: Regular, Advanced Placement (AP)
- Campus type: Rural
- Colors: Red, white, and blue
- Fight song: The Horse
- Athletics conference: 1A 2 South (2012–14)
- Sports: Volleyball, golf, dance, cheer, basketball, baseball, softball, track, football.
- Mascot: Mustang horse
- Team name: Midland Mustangs
- Accreditation: ADE; AdvancED (1990–)
- Affiliation: Arkansas Activities Association
- Website: midlandschools.org

Midland High School (MHS) is an accredited comprehensive public high school located in Pleasant Plains, Arkansas, United States. MHS provides secondary education for approximately 240 students in grades 7 through 12. It is one of four public high schools in Independence County and the sole high school of the Midland School District.

== Academics ==
Midland High School is a Title I school accredited by the Arkansas Department of Education (ADE) and has been accredited by AdvancED since 1990.

The assumed course of study follows the ADE Smart Core curriculum developed by the Arkansas Department of Education (ADE), which requires students to complete at least 22 units prior to graduation. Students complete regular coursework and exams and may take Advanced Placement (AP) courses and exams with the opportunity to receive college credit.

== Athletics ==
The Midland High School mascot is the Mustang with red, white and blue serving as the school colors.

The Midland Mustangs compete in interscholastic activities within the 1A Classification, the state's smallest classification administered by the Arkansas Activities Association. For 2012–14, the Mustangs play within the 1A 2 South Conference.

Midland fields junior varsity and varsity teams in football, volleyball, golf (boys/girls), dance, basketball (boys/girls), baseball, softball, track and field (boys/girls), along with cheer and dance.
