= Midland School District =

School district in Arkansas, United States

Address
- 7249 Batesville Boulevard Pleasant Plains, Arkansas, 72568; United States

District information
- Type: Public
- Grades: PreK–12
- Accreditations: Arkansas Department of Education, AdvancED
- NCES District ID: 0500020

Students and staff
- Students: 471
- Teachers: 58.22
- Staff: 64.5
- Student–teacher ratio: 8.09

Other information
- Website: midlandschools.org

Midland School District is a public school district based in Independence County, Arkansas.

The district and schools' mascot and athletic emblem is the Mustang horse. The Midland Mustangs junior varsity and varsity teams compete in the 2A Classification, the state's second smallest classification, as administered by the Arkansas Activities Association.

The school district encompasses 166.52 square miles (431.3 km^{2}) of land in Independence County, and formed as a result of consolidation of the former Pleasant Plains and Floral school districts located in these two rural communities. The consolidation of the Pleasant Plains School District and the Floral School District was effective on July 1, 1985.

== Schools ==
The Midland School District and both schools are accredited by the Arkansas Department of Education and AdvancED.

- Midland Elementary School, located in Floral and serving prekindergarten through grade 6.
- Midland High School, located in Pleasant Plains and serving grades 7 through 12
