= Dearing House (Newark, Arkansas) =

Historic house in Arkansas, United States

- U.S. National Register of Historic Places
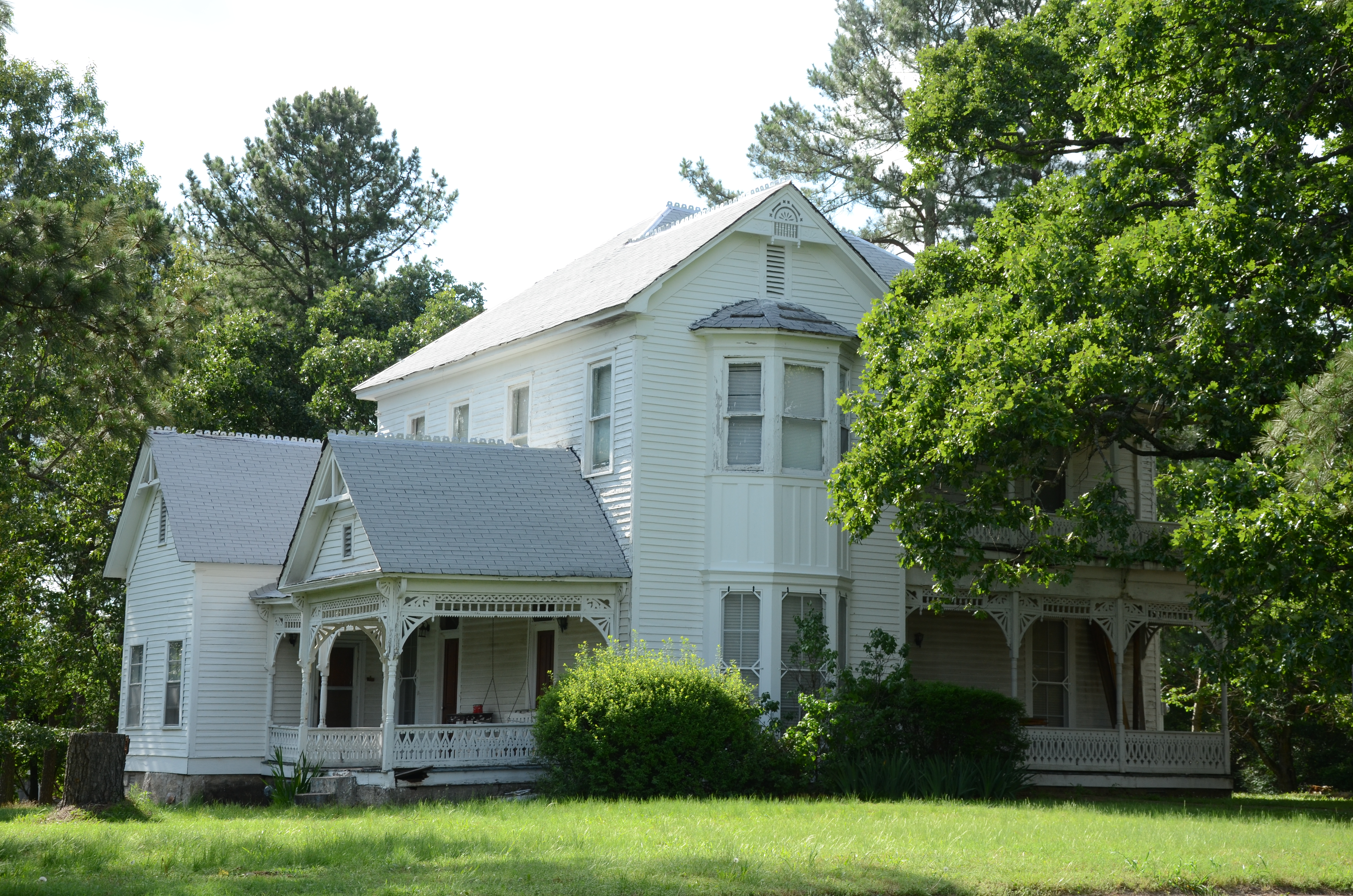

- Location within Arkansas Location within the United States
- Location: AR 122, Newark, Arkansas
- Coordinates: 35°42′9″N 91°26′23″W
- Architect: Thomas Dearing
- Architectural style: Victorian
- NRHP reference No.: 76000419
- Added to NRHP: May 3, 1976

The Dearing House is a historic house on the west side of Arkansas Highway 122, between 7th and 8th Streets, in Newark, Arkansas. It is a 2 1/2-story wood-frame structure, with an L-shaped cross-gable configuration, and clapboard siding. It has several porches decorated with Victorian woodwork and turned posts. The first floor of this house was built about 1890 in the community of Akron, about 5 miles (8.0 km) from its present location. It was moved by its builder, Thomas Dearing, to Newark in 1901, and the second story was added in 1914.

The house was listed on the National Register of Historic Places in 1976.

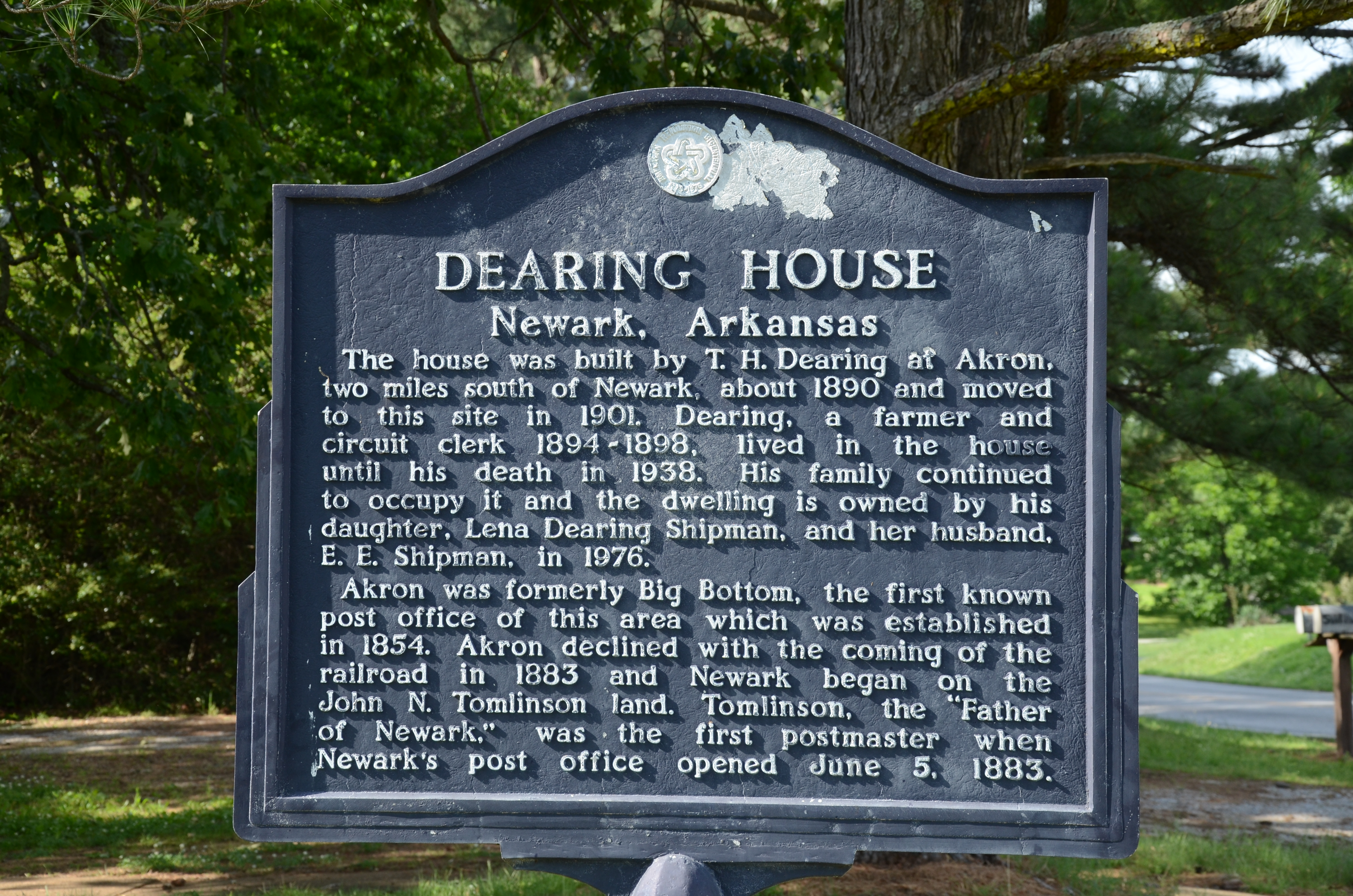
Dearing House Historical Marker

== See also ==
- National Register of Historic Places listings in Independence County, Arkansas
