= Amagon, Arkansas =

- Town
- Location of Amagon in Jackson County, Arkansas.
- Coordinates: 35°33′47″N 91°06′34″W
- Country: United States
- State: Arkansas
- County: Jackson

Area
  - Total: 0.11 sq mi (0.29 km^{2})
  - Land: 0.11 sq mi (0.29 km^{2})
  - Water: 0 sq mi (0.00 km^{2})
- Elevation: 223 ft (68 m)

Population (2020)
  - Total: 69
  - Estimate (2025): 71 ▲
  - Density: 620.1/sq mi (239.42/km^{2})
- Time zone: UTC-6 (Central (CST))
  - Summer (DST): UTC-5 (CDT)
- ZIP code: 72005
- Area code: 870
- FIPS code: 05-01270
- GNIS feature ID: 2405147

Amagon is a town in Jackson County, Arkansas, United States. The population was 69 at the 2020 census. It is the birthplace of former Governor of Arkansas Mike Beebe.

== Geography ==
According to the United States Census Bureau, the town has a total area of 0.12 square miles (0.3 km^{2}), all land.

== Demographics ==
Historical population
| Census | Pop. | Note | %± |
|---|---|---|---|
| 1950 | 181 | | — |
| 1960 | 234 | | 29.3% |
| 1970 | 136 | | −41.9% |
| 1980 | 126 | | −7.4% |
| 1990 | 108 | | −14.3% |
| 2000 | 95 | | −12.0% |
| 2010 | 98 | | 3.2% |
| 2020 | 69 | | −29.6% |
| 2025 (est.) | 71 | ▲ | 2.9% |
U.S. Decennial Census

As of the census of 2000, there were 95 people, 39 households, and 29 families residing in the town. The population density was 366.8 people/km^{2} (950 people/mi^{2}). There were 49 housing units at an average density of 189.2 units/km^{2} (490 units/mi^{2}). The racial makeup of the town was 93.68% White, 6.32% from other races. 6.32% of the population were Hispanic or Latino of any race.

There were 39 households, out of which 28.2% had children under the age of 18 living with them, 61.5% were married couples living together, 15.4% had a female householder with no husband present, and 23.1% were non-families. 20.5% of all households were made up of individuals, and 15.4% had someone living alone who was 65 years of age or older. The average household size was 2.44 and the average family size was 2.83.

In the town, the population was spread out, with 23.2% under the age of 18, 5.3% from 18 to 24, 21.1% from 25 to 44, 31.6% from 45 to 64, and 18.9% who were 65 years of age or older. The median age was 46 years. For every 100 females, there were 72.7 males. For every 100 females age 18 and over, there were 87.2 males.

The median income for a household in the town was $15,938, and the median income for a family was $18,750. Males had a median income of $17,083 versus $12,500 for females. The per capita income for the town was $10,294. There were 23.3% of families and 20.5% of the population living below the poverty line, including 28.6% of under eighteens and 33.3% of those over 64.

== Education ==
It is in the Newport School District.
