= Southside, Independence County, Arkansas =

Coordinates: 35°41.90′N 91°37.40′W

Southside, Arkansas
- City
- Location of Southside in Independence County, Arkansas.
- Country: United States
- State: Arkansas
- County: Independence
- Incorporated: 2014

Government

Area
  - Total: 9.86 sq mi (25.53 km^{2})
  - Land: 9.86 sq mi (25.53 km^{2})
  - Water: 0.0039 sq mi (0.01 km^{2})
- Elevation: 374 ft (114 m)

Population (2020)
  - Total: 4,279
  - Estimate (2025): 4,274 ▼
  - Density: 434.2/sq mi (167.64/km^{2})
- Time zone: UTC-6 (CST)
  - Summer (DST): UTC-5 (CDT)
- FIPS code: 05-65630
- GNIS feature ID: 2771128
- Website: cityofsouthside.org

Southside is an incorporated city located in Independence County, Arkansas, United States.

The elevation of Southside is 354 feet (108 m).

The spur route of Arkansas Highway 14 connects Southside with Salado.

== History ==
Southside was incorporated on October 29, 2014.

== Demographics ==
Southside racial composition as of 2020 (NH = Non-Hispanic) (Note: Note: the US Census treats Hispanic/Latino as an ethnic category. This table excludes Latinos from the racial categories and assigns them to a separate category. Hispanics/Latinos can be of any race.)
Race	Number	Percentage
White (NH)	3,660	85.53%
Black or African American (NH)	79	1.85%
Native American or Alaska Native (NH)	6	0.14%
Asian (NH)	31	0.72%
Pacific Islander (NH)	2	0.05%
Some Other Race (NH)	4	0.09%
Mixed/Multi-Racial (NH)	249	5.82%
Hispanic or Latino	248	5.8%
Total	4,279	

As of the 2020 United States census, there were 4,279 people, 1,560 households, and 1,002 families residing in the city.

== Education ==
The majority of the municipality is in the Southside School District. A small portion is in the Batesville School District.

Southside High School is the sole comprehensive high school of the Southside district. Batesville High School is the Batesville district's sole comprehensive high school.
