= Charlotte, Arkansas =

- Unincorporated community
- Location within Arkansas Location within the United States
- Coordinates: 35°49′06″N 91°26′19″W
- Country: United States
- State: Arkansas
- County: Independence
- Elevation: 345 ft (105 m)
- Time zone: UTC-6 (Central (CST))
  - Summer (DST): UTC-5 (CDT)
- ZIP code: 72522
- Area code: 870
- GNIS feature ID: 47710

Charlotte is an unincorporated community in Independence County, Arkansas, United States. Charlotte is located on Highway 25S, 12 miles (19 km) east-northeast of Batesville. Charlotte has a post office with ZIP code 72522.

Charlotte is served by the Cedar Ridge School District. It was formed on July 1, 2004, from the consolidation of the Cord Charlotte School District and the Newark School District.
