= Cedar Ridge School District =

School district in Arkansas, United States

Address
- 1502 North Hill Street Newark, Arkansas, 72562; United States

District information
- Type: Public
- Grades: K–12
- NCES District ID: 0500070

Students and staff
- Students: 685
- Teachers: 112.33
- Staff: 66.59
- Student–teacher ratio: 6.1

Other information
- Website: www.cedarwolves.org

Cedar Ridge School District (CRSD) is a public school district in Independence County, Arkansas, United States. Cedar Ridge School District serves the Newark, Charlotte, Cord, and Oil Trough communities, and encompasses 266.57 square miles (690.4 km^{2}) of land.

It was formed on July 1, 2004, from the consolidation of the Newark School District and the Cord Charlotte School District.

== Schools ==
- Cord–Charlotte Elementary School, located in Charlotte and serving kindergarten through grade 6.
- Newark Elementary School, located in Newark and serving kindergarten through grade 6.
- Cedar Ridge High School, located in Newark and serving grades 7 through 12.
