= Charles R. Handford House =

Historic house in Arkansas, United States

- U.S. National Register of Historic Places
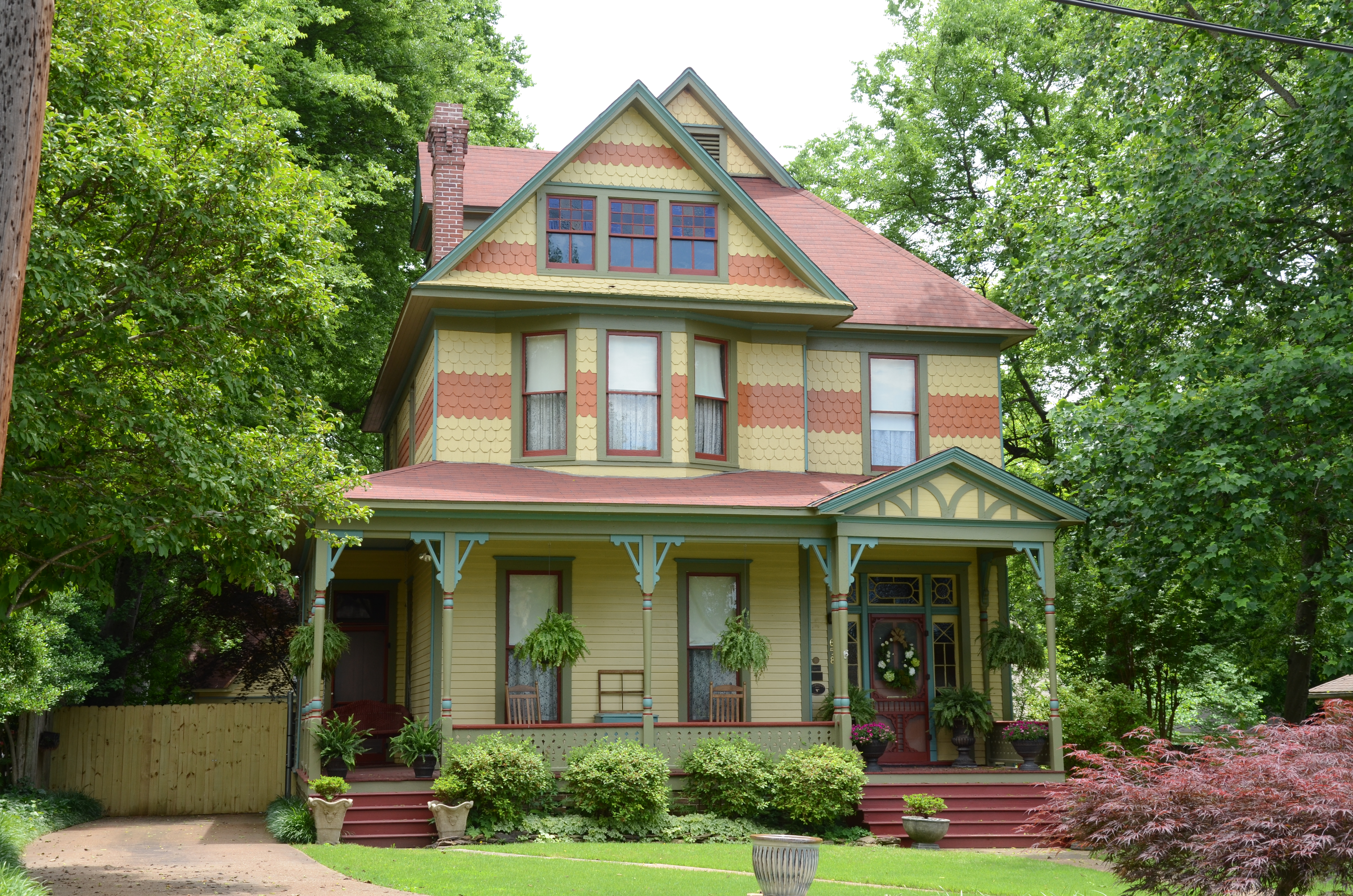

- Location within Arkansas Location within the United States
- Location: 658 E. Boswell St., Batesville, Arkansas
- Coordinates: 35°46′16″N 91°38′49″W
- Area: less than one acre
- Architectural style: Queen Anne, Queen Anne Victorian
- NRHP reference No.: 75000390
- Added to NRHP: May 2, 1975

The Charles R. Handford House is a historic house in 658 E. Boswell Street in Batesville, Arkansas, USA. It is a 2 1/2-story wood-frame structure, built in 1888 with elaborate Queen Anne Victorian styling. It has a wraparound porch with delicate turned posts with brackets and a paneled balustrade. Its irregular massing includes a front-facing gable and corner polygonal bay, with bands of decorative scalloped shingles on the sides. The house is a near mirror-image of the James S. Handford House, located across the street. Built by two brothers, these houses are fine examples of Victorian architecture, important also for their association with the Handfords, who were prominent in the local lumber business.

The house was listed on the National Register of Historic Places in 1975.

== See also ==
- National Register of Historic Places listings in Independence County, Arkansas
