= Limedale, Arkansas =

Unincorporated community in Arkansas, US

Coordinates: 35°47′38″N 91°43′10″W

Limedale is an unincorporated community in Independence County, Arkansas, United States.

It was named for the lime produced there.
