= Pleasant Plains, Arkansas =

- Town
- Location of Pleasant Plains in Independence County, Arkansas
- Coordinates: 35°33′16″N 91°37′38″W
- Country: United States
- State: Arkansas
- County: Independence

Area
  - Total: 1.01 sq mi (2.61 km^{2})
  - Land: 1.01 sq mi (2.61 km^{2})
  - Water: 0 sq mi (0.00 km^{2})
- Elevation: 597 ft (182 m)

Population (2020)
  - Total: 352
  - Estimate (2025): 348 ▼
  - Density: 349.9/sq mi (135.11/km^{2})
- Time zone: UTC-6 (Central (CST))
  - Summer (DST): UTC-5 (CDT)
- ZIP code: 72568
- Area code: 501
- FIPS code: 05-56270
- GNIS feature ID: 2407136
- Website: cityofpleasantplains.gov

Pleasant Plains is a town in Independence County, Arkansas, United States. As of the 2020 census, Pleasant Plains had a population of 352.

== History ==
The historic Southwest Trail, a path used by most travelers entering Arkansas early in the 1800s, entered Pleasant Plains on today's U.S. Highway 167 from Southside. From Pleasant Plains the Southwest Trail headed to Sunnydale via Arkansas Highway 157, en route to Center Hill and Floyd. By the 1830s more than 80 percent of the Arkansas territory's population had entered through the Southwest Trail. The route, at the time the main route to Texas, is also known as the Old Military Road.

== Geography ==
According to the United States Census Bureau, the town has a total area of 0.93 square miles (2.4 km^{2}), all land.

== Demographics ==
Historical population
Census	Pop.	Note	%±
1910	151		—
1920	116		−23.2%
1930	135		16.4%
1940	156		15.6%
1950	153		−1.9%
1960	112		−26.8%
1970	162		44.6%
1980	267		64.8%
1990	256		−4.1%
2000	267		4.3%
2010	349		30.7%
2020	352		0.9%
2025 (est.)	348	▼	−1.1%
U.S. Decennial Census

As of the census of 2000, there were 267 people, 106 households, and 78 families residing in the town. The population density was 121.3/km^{2} (314.5/mi^{2}). There were 120 housing units at an average density of 54.5/km^{2} (141.3/mi^{2}). The racial makeup of the town was 94.76% White, 1.50% Native American, 2.25% from other races, and 1.50% from two or more races. 4.87% of the population were Hispanic or Latino of any race.

There were 106 households, out of which 34.9% had children under the age of 18 living with them, 56.6% were married couples living together, 13.2% had a female householder with no husband present, and 26.4% were non-families. 25.5% of all households were made up of individuals, and 13.2% had someone living alone who was 65 years of age or older. The average household size was 2.52 and the average family size was 3.03.

In the town, the population was spread out, with 26.2% under the age of 18, 7.5% from 18 to 24, 31.8% from 25 to 44, 21.0% from 45 to 64, and 13.5% who were 65 years of age or older. The median age was 34 years. For every 100 females, there were 103.8 males. For every 100 females age 18 and over, there were 97.0 males.

The median income for a household in the town was $22,188, and the median income for a family was $35,000. Males had a median income of $22,344 versus $17,250 for females. The per capita income for the town was $11,129. About 11.4% of families and 16.0% of the population were below the poverty line, including 13.6% of those under the age of eighteen and 30.4% of those 65 or over.

== Education ==
Since the 1985–86 school year, public education for elementary and secondary students has been provided by the Midland School District, which includes Midland Elementary School and Midland High School, all based in this community. Midland formed as a result of consolidation of the former Pleasant Plains and Floral school districts. The consolidation of the Pleasant Plains School District and the Floral School District was effective on July 1, 1985.

== Transportation ==
Highways

- U.S. Highway 167
- Arkansas Highway 87
- Arkansas Highway 157
