= Southside School District =

School district in Arkansas, United States

Address
- 70 Scott Drive Batesville, Arkansas, 72501; United States

District information
- Type: Public
- Grades: PreK–12
- NCES District ID: 0512540

Students and staff
- Students: 2,236
- Teachers: 156.19
- Staff: 90.43
- Student–teacher ratio: 14.32

Other information
- Website: www.southsideschools.org

Southside School District is a school district in Southside, Independence County, Arkansas.

The district includes the majority of Southside, and it also includes the Salado census-designated place.

On July 1, 1990, the Oil Trough School District was dissolved, with portions going to the Southside School District.

The football field “Scott Field” was built in 1990 as with the field house.

Southside Just recently (2026) added a 40M Dollar addition to the district which has a college level basketball arena and practice facilities for basketball, cheer, and dance. Plus, concessions, more classrooms and a new AG and Skilled trades workshop. This addition also adds a new cafeteria serving the High School and the Middle School (Junior High) and provides students with options of a salad bar, drink island with propels, sparkling ices, and Gatorades etc. To boost morale so students can learn easier and more efficient. This building helps prepare and de-stress students about the college atmosphere and opportunities. White River Now stated, "The Southside School District officially opened a new multi-million-dollar campus facility Thursday, marking the completion of a multi-year expansion project that added an arena, practice gym, locker rooms, weight room, and severe-weather safe room to its junior and senior high campus."

== Schools ==
- Southside Preschool
- Southside Elementary
- Southside Intermediate School
- Southside Middle School
- Southside High School

== Athletics ==
Southside is the smallest 5A school in Arkansas sports included: football, softball, baseball, cheer, soccer, esports, archery, dance.
