= Newark School District =

Defunct school district in Arkansas, United States

Newark School District was a school district headquartered in Newark, Arkansas. Its schools included Newark Preschool, Newark Elementary School, and Newark High School.

On July 1, 1990, the Oil Trough School District was dissolved, with portions going to the Newark School District. On July 1, 2004, it merged with the Cord Charlotte School District to form the Cedar Ridge School District.
