= Newark, Arkansas =

- City
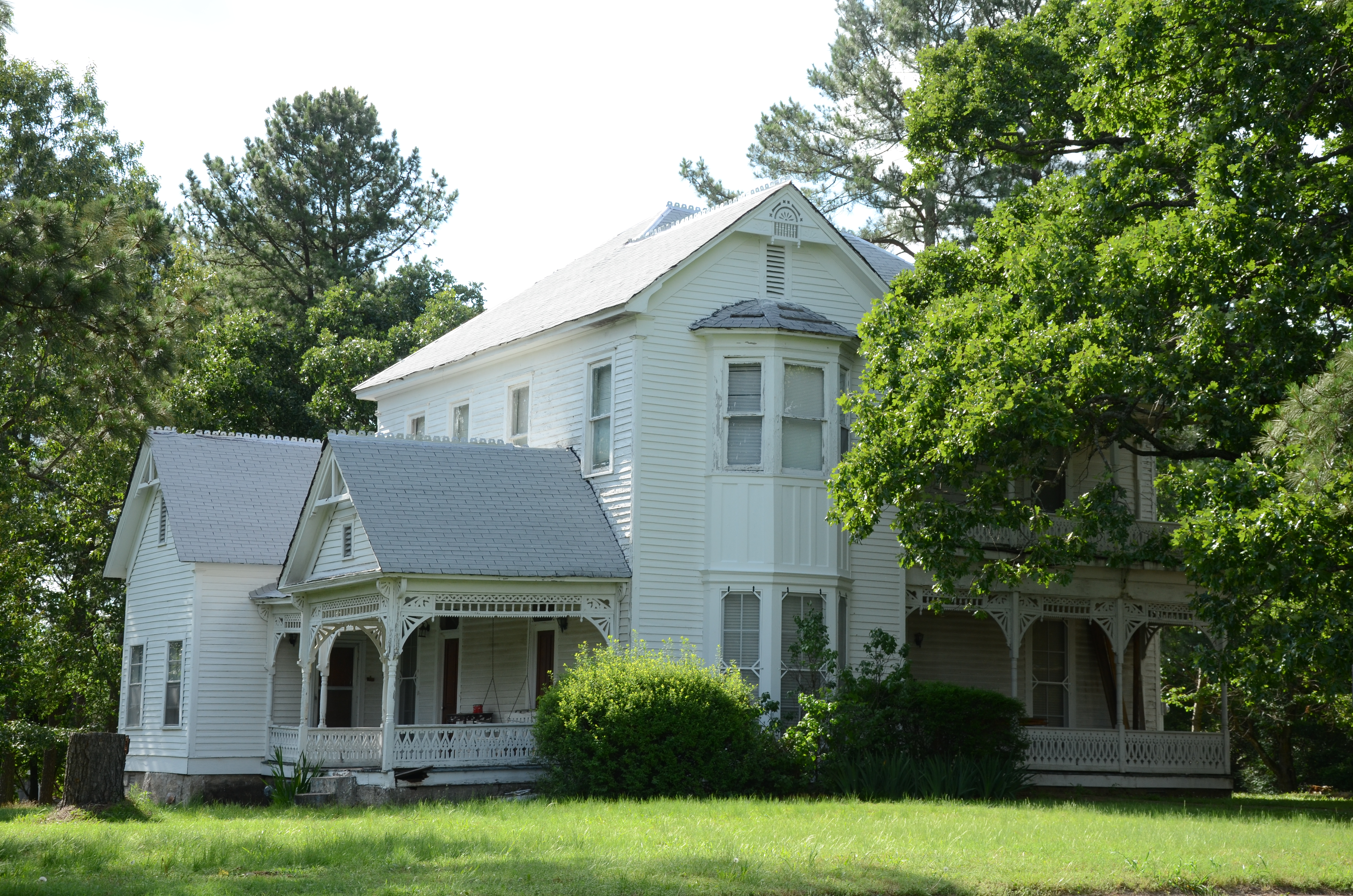
- Dearing House in Newark

- Location of Newark in Independence County, Arkansas.
- Coordinates: 35°42′27″N 91°26′36″W
- Country: United States
- State: Arkansas
- County: Independence

Area
  - Total: 1.64 sq mi (4.26 km^{2})
  - Land: 1.64 sq mi (4.26 km^{2})
  - Water: 0 sq mi (0.00 km^{2})
- Elevation: 299 ft (91 m)

Population (2020)
  - Total: 1,180
  - Estimate (2025): 1,184 ▲
  - Density: 717.4/sq mi (276.99/km^{2})
- Time zone: UTC−06:00 (Central (CST))
  - Summer (DST): UTC−05:00 (CDT)
- ZIP Code: 72562
- Area code: 870
- FIPS code: 05-49010
- GNIS feature ID: 2404368
- Website: www.newarkar.com

Newark is a city in Independence County, Arkansas, United States. The population was 1,180 at the 2020 census.

== Geography ==
Newark is located in east central Independence County approximately three miles north of the White River, and near the mouth of the Black River.

According to the United States Census Bureau, the city has a total area of 1.8 square miles (4.7 km^{2}), all land.

=== List of highways ===
- Arkansas Highway 69
- Arkansas Highway 69 Business
- Arkansas Highway 122

== Demographics ==
Historical population
Census	Pop.	Note	%±
1900	315		—
1910	595		88.9%
1920	906		52.3%
1930	897		−1.0%
1940	802		−10.6%
1950	913		13.8%
1960	728		−20.3%
1970	849		16.6%
1980	1,128		32.9%
1990	1,159		2.7%
2000	1,219		5.2%
2010	1,176		−3.5%
2020	1,180		0.3%
2025 (est.)	1,184	▲	0.3%
U.S. Decennial Census

=== 2020 census ===
As of the 2020 census, Newark had a population of 1,180, with 488 households and 302 families residing in the city.

The median age was 38.2 years. About 25.0% of residents were under the age of 18, and 17.2% were 65 years of age or older. For every 100 females, there were 87.3 males, and for every 100 females age 18 and over, there were 84.0 males age 18 and over.

Of residents, 0.0% lived in urban areas and 100.0% lived in rural areas.

Of the 488 households, 36.3% had children under the age of 18 living in them. Of all households, 40.0% were married-couple households, 19.1% were households with a male householder and no spouse or partner present, and 32.4% were households with a female householder and no spouse or partner present. About 30.9% of all households were made up of individuals, and 14.9% had someone living alone who was 65 years of age or older.

There were 553 housing units, of which 11.8% were vacant. The homeowner vacancy rate was 2.4%, and the rental vacancy rate was 14.1%.

Newark racial composition
Race	Number	Percentage
White (non-Hispanic)	1,067	90.42%
Black or African American (non-Hispanic)	17	1.44%
Native American	3	0.25%
Pacific Islander	1	0.08%
Other/Mixed	42	3.56%
Hispanic or Latino	50	4.24%

=== 2000 census ===
As of the census of 2000, there were 1,219 people, 500 households, and 345 families residing in the city. The population density was 696.9 inhabitants per square mile (269.1/km^{2}). There were 562 housing units at an average density of 321.3 per square mile (124.1/km^{2}). The racial makeup of the city was 96.55% White, 0.66% Black or African American, 0.98% Native American, 0.49% Asian, 0.08% Pacific Islander, 0.08% from other races, and 1.15% from two or more races. 0.90% of the population were Hispanic or Latino of any race.

There were 500 households, out of which 35.8% had children under the age of 18 living with them, 55.0% were married couples living together, 10.6% had a female householder with no husband present, and 31.0% were non-families. 29.0% of all households were made up of individuals, and 18.0% had someone living alone who was 65 years of age or older. The average household size was 2.44 and the average family size was 3.01.

In the city, the population was spread out, with 26.7% under the age of 18, 8.8% from 18 to 24, 27.6% from 25 to 44, 21.5% from 45 to 64, and 15.4% who were 65 years of age or older. The median age was 36 years. For every 100 females, there were 87.0 males. For every 100 females age 18 and over, there were 83.6 males.

The median income for a household in the city was $28,239, and the median income for a family was $34,545. Males had a median income of $27,404 versus $17,692 for females. The per capita income for the city was $14,392. About 9.1% of families and 14.2% of the population were below the poverty line, including 18.5% of those under age 18 and 20.1% of those age 65 or over.

== Education ==
Students in Newark are served by Cedar Ridge School District. It was formed on July 1, 2004, from the consolidation of the Newark School District and the Cord-Charlotte School District.

The local high school has won three basketball state championships, two quiz bowl state titles, and one softball state championship. NBA shooting guard Austin Reaves attended Cedar Ridge and helped them win back-to-back state championships. Reaves holds the single game scoring record, scoring 73 points in a triple-overtime win over Forrest City High School.

== Notable people ==
- Austin Reaves (born May 29, 1998), professional basketball player

== See also ==
- List of cities in Arkansas
