= Independence County, Arkansas =

County in Arkansas, United States

- County
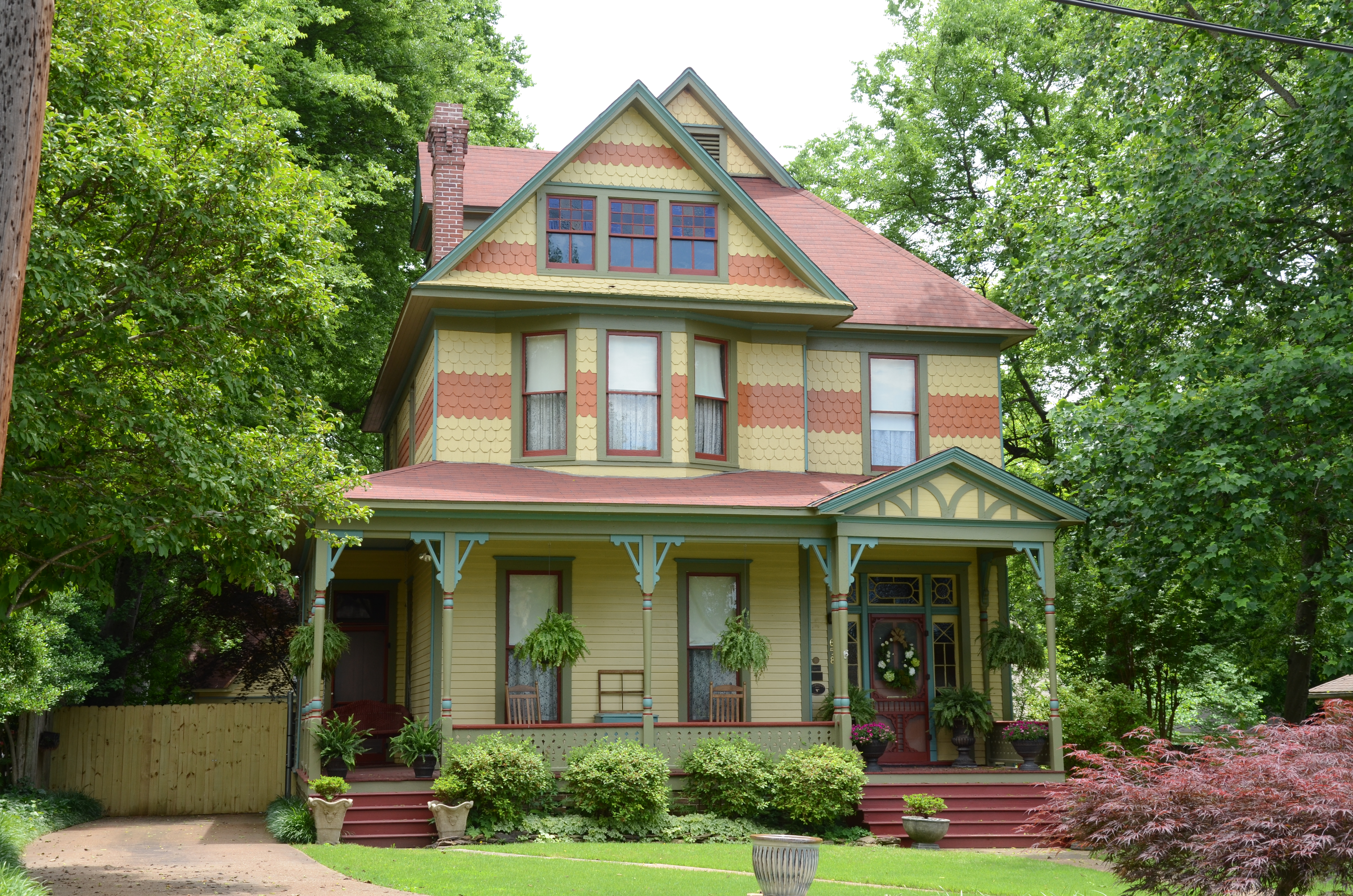
- Historic Charles R. Handford House in Batesville.

- Flag Seal

- Location within the U.S. state of Arkansas
- Coordinates: 35°43′23″N 91°31′14″W
- Country: United States
- State: Arkansas
- Founded: October 20, 1820
- Named for: United States Declaration of Independence
- Seat: Batesville
- Largest city: Batesville

Area
  - Total: 772 sq mi (2,000 km^{2})
  - Land: 764 sq mi (1,980 km^{2})
  - Water: 7.6 sq mi (20 km^{2}) 1.0%

Population (2020)
  - Total: 37,938
  - Estimate (2025): 38,785 ▲
  - Density: 49.7/sq mi (19.2/km^{2})
- Time zone: UTC−6 (Central)
  - Summer (DST): UTC−5 (CDT)
- Congressional district: 1st
- Website: www.independencecounty.com

Independence County is a county located in the U.S. state of Arkansas. As of the 2020 census, the population was 37,938. The county seat is Batesville. Independence County is Arkansas's ninth county, formed on October 20, 1820, from a portion of Lawrence County and named in commemoration of the Declaration of Independence. It is an alcohol prohibition or dry county.

The Batesville, AR Micropolitan Statistical Area includes all of Independence County.

== History ==
Independence County was the ninth county formed in the Arkansas Territory, and the fourth created after the territory itself was established. The act creating the county was signed by territorial governor James Miller in October 1820. As originally formed, the county was far larger than its present boundaries, extending from the mouth of the Little Red River to the Missouri line and encompassing all or part of the present-day counties of Fulton, Baxter, Sharp, Izard, Stone, Cleburne, Van Buren, White, Jackson, and Woodruff, each of which was later separated from Independence County as the region's population grew.

The area had been inhabited by Native Americans for at least ten millennia before European settlement, and more than 1,200 archaeological sites have been recorded within the modern county by the Arkansas Archeological Survey. Archaeologist Clarence B. Moore excavated several of the county's sites in the early 20th century, including the Little Turkey Hill site near the Black River. The Mississippian-era culture identified along this stretch of the White River is known as the Greenbrier Phase, named for a large town site located near Batesville. The Osage ceded the surrounding territory to the United States by treaty in 1808, and the Cherokee, who also held land in the area for a period, ceded it back to the federal government in 1828.

Batesville, the county seat, was settled at the site of a trading post at the mouth of Poke (or Polk) Bayou on the White River, where a branch of the Southwest Trail crossed the river. A post office was opened at the site under the name Poke Creek on November 7, 1820, with the county's first sheriff, Charles Kelly, serving as postmaster; the office was formally renamed Batesville, after territorial congressional delegate James Woodson Bates, on January 7, 1824. In 1832, President Andrew Jackson appointed Jesse Bean, a resident of the county, to command a newly formed cavalry company tasked with patrolling the western frontier; the unit, largely made up of Independence County men and known as "Bean's Rangers," was later described by Washington Irving in his book A Tour on the Prairies. The county provided two infantry companies to the United States Army during the Mexican–American War; one of two county men killed at the Battle of Buena Vista was Andrew Porter, a local newspaper editor, who was memorialized with a monument erected in Batesville.

Independence County has been the home of three Arkansas governors: Thomas S. Drew, Elisha Baxter, and William R. Miller.

== Geography ==
According to the U.S. Census Bureau, the county has a total area of 772 square miles (2,000 km^{2}), of which 764 square miles (1,980 km^{2}) is land and 7.6 square miles (20 km^{2}) (1.0%) is water.

=== List of highways ===
- U.S. Highway 167
- Arkansas Highway 14
- Arkansas Highway 25
- Arkansas Highway 37
- Arkansas Highway 69
  - Arkansas Highway 69 Business
- Arkansas Highway 87
- Arkansas Highway 106
- Arkansas Highway 122
- Arkansas Highway 157
- Arkansas Highway 230
- Arkansas Highway 233
- Arkansas Highway 333
- Arkansas Highway 367
- Arkansas Highway 394

=== Adjacent counties ===
- Sharp County (north)
- Lawrence County (northeast)
- Jackson County (east)
- White County (south)
- Cleburne County (southwest)
- Stone County (west)
- Izard County (northwest)

== Demographics ==
Historical population
Census	Pop.	Note	%±
1830	2,031		—
1840	3,669		80.6%
1850	7,767		111.7%
1860	14,307		84.2%
1870	14,566		1.8%
1880	18,086		24.2%
1890	21,961		21.4%
1900	22,557		2.7%
1910	24,776		9.8%
1920	23,976		−3.2%
1930	24,225		1.0%
1940	25,643		5.9%
1950	23,488		−8.4%
1960	20,048		−14.6%
1970	22,723		13.3%
1980	30,147		32.7%
1990	31,192		3.5%
2000	34,233		9.7%
2010	36,647		7.1%
2020	37,938		3.5%
2025 (est.)	38,785	▲	2.2%
U.S. Decennial Census; 1790–1960 1900–1990; 1990–2000 2010

=== 2020 census ===
As of the 2020 census, the county had a population of 37,938. The median age was 38.8 years. 24.2% of residents were under the age of 18 and 17.9% of residents were 65 years of age or older. For every 100 females there were 97.3 males, and for every 100 females age 18 and over there were 95.2 males age 18 and over.

The racial makeup of the county was 84.6% White, 2.2% Black or African American, 0.6% American Indian and Alaska Native, 0.9% Asian, 0.1% Native Hawaiian and Pacific Islander, 5.1% from some other race, and 6.4% from two or more races. Hispanic or Latino residents of any race comprised 8.6% of the population.

28.8% of residents lived in urban areas, while 71.2% lived in rural areas.

There were 14,934 households in the county, of which 31.5% had children under the age of 18 living in them. Of all households, 48.9% were married-couple households, 18.6% were households with a male householder and no spouse or partner present, and 25.6% were households with a female householder and no spouse or partner present. About 28.7% of all households were made up of individuals and 13.0% had someone living alone who was 65 years of age or older.

There were 16,667 housing units, of which 10.4% were vacant. Among occupied housing units, 68.3% were owner-occupied and 31.7% were renter-occupied. The homeowner vacancy rate was 1.9% and the rental vacancy rate was 8.2%.

=== 2000 census ===
As of the 2000 census, there were 34,233 people, 13,467 households, and 9,669 families residing in the county. The population density was 45 people per square mile (17 people/km^{2}). There were 14,841 housing units at an average density of 19 units per square mile (7.3 units/km^{2}). The racial makeup of the county was 94.91% White, 2.04% Black or African American, 0.45% Native American, 0.65% Asian, 0.03% Pacific Islander, 0.64% from other races, and 1.28% from two or more races. 1.53% of the population were Hispanic or Latino of any race.

There were 13,467 households, out of which 32.10% had children under the age of 18 living with them, 59.00% were married couples living together, 9.20% had a female householder with no husband present, and 28.20% were non-families. 25.50% of all households were made up of individuals, and 11.70% had someone living alone who was 65 years of age or older. The average household size was 2.47 and the average family size was 2.95.

In the county, the population was spread out, with 24.50% under the age of 18, 9.20% from 18 to 24, 27.70% from 25 to 44, 24.10% from 45 to 64, and 14.50% who were 65 years of age or older. The median age was 38 years. For every 100 females there were 96.30 males. For every 100 females age 18 and over, there were 92.60 males.

The median income for a household in the county was $31,920, and the median income for a family was $38,444. Males had a median income of $27,284 versus $20,086 for females. The per capita income for the county was $16,163. About 9.90% of families and 13.00% of the population were below the poverty line, including 16.10% of those under age 18 and 14.40% of those age 65 or over.

== Government and politics ==
=== Government ===
The county government is a constitutional body granted specific powers by the Constitution of Arkansas and the Arkansas Code. The quorum court is the legislative branch of the county government and controls all spending and revenue collection. Representatives are called justices of the peace and are elected from county districts every even-numbered year. The number of districts in a county vary from nine to fifteen, and district boundaries are drawn by the county election commission. The Independence County Quorum Court has eleven members. Presiding over quorum court meetings is the county judge, who serves as the chief executive officer of the county. The county judge is elected at-large and does not vote in quorum court business, although capable of vetoing quorum court decisions.

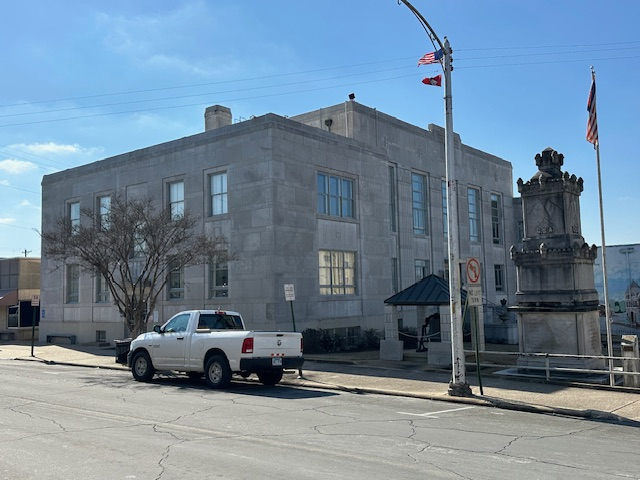
Independence County Courthouse in Batesville, 2-2025. The Batesville Confederate Monument, seen on the right-hand side, is on the National Register of Historic Places listings in Independence County, Arkansas

Independence County, Arkansas Elected countywide officials
Position	Officeholder	Party
County Judge	Kevin Jeffery	Republican
County Clerk	Tracey Nast Mitchell	Republican
Circuit Clerk	Greg Wallis	Republican
Sheriff	Shawn Stephens	Republican
Treasurer	Bob Treadway	Republican
Collector	Paul Albert	Republican
Assessor	Diane Tucker	Republican
Coroner	Randell Crabtree	Republican

The composition of the Quorum Court following the 2024 elections is 11 Republicans. Justices of the Peace (members) of the Quorum Court following the elections are:

- District 1: Timothy Stewart (R) of Batesville.
- District 2: Johnny McMullin (R) of Locust Grove.
- District 3: Brent Henderson (R) of Pleasant Plains.
- District 4: Charles Bradley Covington (R) of Batesville.
- District 5: Bill Lindsey (R) of Newark.
- District 6: Tammy Pearce (R) of Batesville.
- District 7: Jason W. Jones (R) of Batesville.
- District 8: Kenny Hurley (R) of Cushman.
- District 9: Johnathan Abbott (R) of Batesville.
- District 10: Charles Jordan (R) of Batesville.
- District 11: Dennis Stephens (R) of Batesville.

Additionally, the townships of Independence County are entitled to elect their own respective constables, as set forth by the Constitution of Arkansas. Constables are largely of historical significance as they were used to keep the peace in rural areas when travel was more difficult. The township constables as of the 2024 elections are:

- Barren: Barry E. Wilkes (R)
- Big Bottom-Wycough-Logan: Jeffrey Tate (R)
- Cushman-Union: Gary Franks (R)
- Dota: Ronald Laslo (R)
- Greenbrier: Aaron Moody (R)
- Hill: Joe Shaw (R)
- Liberty: Billy E. Meeks (R)
- McHue: Anthony Mesa (R)
- Moorefield: Michael Mundy (R)
- Rosie: Chad Webb (R)
- Ruddell: Brenda Bittle (R)
- Salado: David H. Payne (R)
- Washington: Stephen Davis (R)

=== Politics ===
United States presidential election results for Independence County, Arkansas
Year	Republican		Democratic		Third party(ies)	
Year	No.	%	No.	%	No.	%
1836	113	45.75%	134	54.25%	0	0.00%
1840	370	65.14%	198	34.86%	0	0.00%
1844	278	45.35%	335	54.65%	0	0.00%
1848	422	50.84%	408	49.16%	0	0.00%
1852	452	42.48%	612	57.52%	0	0.00%
1856	0	0.00%	860	58.42%	612	41.58%
1860	0	0.00%	281	14.82%	1,615	85.18%
1868	566	45.53%	677	54.47%	0	0.00%
1872	810	56.21%	631	43.79%	0	0.00%
1876	436	25.03%	1,306	74.97%	0	0.00%
1880	495	24.92%	1,463	73.67%	28	1.41%
1884	686	26.35%	1,917	73.65%	0	0.00%
1888	324	9.62%	1,789	53.10%	1,256	37.28%
1892	868	28.89%	1,792	59.63%	345	11.48%
1896	567	21.19%	2,089	78.06%	20	0.75%
1900	782	32.72%	1,526	63.85%	82	3.43%
1904	736	39.85%	1,052	56.96%	59	3.19%
1908	948	35.72%	1,529	57.61%	177	6.67%
1912	412	18.73%	1,225	55.68%	563	25.59%
1916	762	27.72%	1,987	72.28%	0	0.00%
1920	1,077	39.74%	1,546	57.05%	87	3.21%
1924	534	26.15%	1,313	64.30%	195	9.55%
1928	1,150	43.10%	1,511	56.63%	7	0.26%
1932	371	13.20%	2,427	86.34%	13	0.46%
1936	685	24.53%	2,101	75.25%	6	0.21%
1940	928	28.82%	2,276	70.68%	16	0.50%
1944	1,192	40.00%	1,779	59.70%	9	0.30%
1948	855	24.15%	2,340	66.08%	346	9.77%
1952	2,499	49.95%	2,485	49.67%	19	0.38%
1956	2,333	49.82%	2,316	49.46%	34	0.73%
1960	2,639	49.90%	2,487	47.02%	163	3.08%
1964	2,470	35.49%	4,455	64.01%	35	0.50%
1968	2,782	35.48%	2,289	29.19%	2,770	35.33%
1972	5,076	65.74%	2,630	34.06%	15	0.19%
1976	2,878	28.79%	7,116	71.17%	4	0.04%
1980	5,076	45.63%	5,683	51.08%	366	3.29%
1984	7,428	62.36%	4,415	37.07%	68	0.57%
1988	6,637	59.22%	4,523	40.36%	48	0.43%
1992	4,232	32.96%	7,083	55.16%	1,525	11.88%
1996	4,021	34.58%	6,240	53.66%	1,367	11.76%
2000	6,145	53.00%	5,146	44.39%	303	2.61%
2004	7,430	57.11%	5,443	41.83%	138	1.06%
2008	8,255	67.12%	3,688	29.99%	356	2.89%
2012	8,728	70.40%	3,281	26.47%	388	3.13%
2016	9,936	72.98%	2,881	21.16%	797	5.85%
2020	11,250	77.52%	2,806	19.34%	456	3.14%
2024	11,023	78.67%	2,689	19.19%	299	2.13%

Over the past few election cycles Independence County has trended heavily towards the GOP. The last Democrat (as of 2024) to carry this county was Bill Clinton in 1996.

== Communities ==
=== Cities ===
- Batesville (county seat)
- Cave City
- Cushman
- Newark
- Southside

=== Towns ===
- Magness
- Moorefield
- Oil Trough
- Pleasant Plains
- Sulphur Rock

=== Census-designated places ===
- Bethesda
- Desha
- Floral
- Salado

=== Other unincorporated communities ===
- Antioch (Independence County)
- Cedar Grove
- Charlotte
- Cord
- Dota
- Gainsboro
- Jamestown
- Limedale
- Locust Grove
- McHue
- Pfeiffer
- Rosie
- Sandtown
- Thida
- Walnut Grove

=== Townships ===
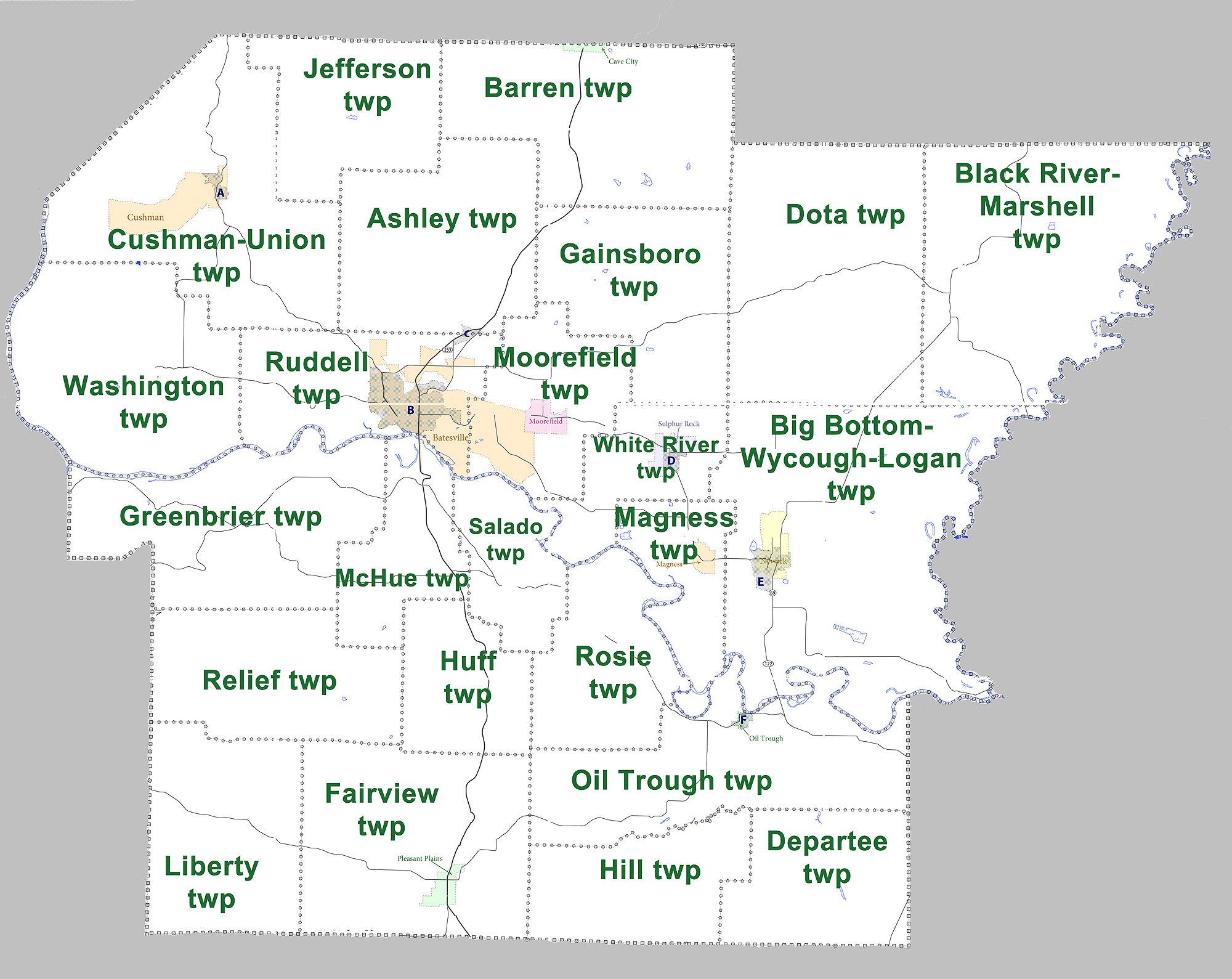
Townships in Independence County, Arkansas as of 2010

Townships in Arkansas are the divisions of a county. Each township includes unincorporated areas; some may have incorporated cities or towns within part of their boundaries. Arkansas townships have limited purposes in modern times. However, the United States census does list Arkansas population based on townships (sometimes referred to as "county subdivisions" or "minor civil divisions"). Townships are also of value for historical purposes in terms of genealogical research. Each town or city is within one or more townships in an Arkansas county based on census maps and publications. The townships of Independence County are listed below; listed in parentheses are the cities, towns, and/or census-designated places that are fully or partially inside the township.

- Ashley
- Barren (contains part of Cave City)
- Big Bottom-Wycough-Logan Township (contains Newark)
- Black River-Marshell
- Cushman-Union (contains Cushman)
- Departee
- Dota
- Fairview (contains Pleasant Plains)
- Gainsboro
- Greenbrier
- Hill
- Huff
- Jefferson
- Liberty
- McHue (contains part of Batesville)
- Magness (contains Magness)
- Moorefield (contains Moorefield, part of Batesville)
- Oil Trough (contains Oil Trough)
- Relief
- Rosie
- Ruddell (contains most of Batesville)
- Salado
- Washington
- White River (contains Sulphur Rock)

== Education ==
Lyon College, a private liberal arts college affiliated with the Presbyterian Church, is located in Batesville. It was founded in 1872 as Arkansas College, in part as a rebuilding effort following the American Civil War, and was renamed Lyon College in 1994.

School districts in Arkansas include:

- Batesville School District
- Cave City School District
- Cedar Ridge School District
- Concord Public Schools
- Midland School District
- Hillcrest School District
- Southside School District

== See also ==
- List of lakes in Independence County, Arkansas
- James Sturch, state representative for Independence County
- National Register of Historic Places listings in Independence County, Arkansas
