= Illinois River Bridge =

Illinois River Bridge may refer to the following bridges along the Illinois River in the U.S. state of Arkansas:

- Illinois River Bridge (Pedro, Arkansas)
- Illinois River Bridge at Phillips Ford, in Savoy, Arkansas
- Illinois River Bridge (Siloam Springs, Arkansas)

== See also ==
- Illinois River (disambiguation), multiple rivers with the same name
  - Illinois River (Illinois), a tributary of the Mississippi River in the U.S. state of Illinois
  - Illinois River (Arkansas–Oklahoma), a tributary of the Arkansas River in the U.S. states of Arkansas and Oklahoma
