= Luten Bridge Company =

Luten Bridge Company and variations such as Luten Engineering Company was the name of a number of different bridge building companies in the United States during the early- to mid-20th century. Each had rights to build concrete Luten arch bridges, according to the patented designs of Daniel B. Luten, of Indianapolis.

One that distributed a brochure in 1921 and that was prolific in Tennessee had offices in York, Pennsylvania, in Clarksburg, West Virginia, in Huntington, West Virginia, in Atlanta, Georgia, and in Palatka, Florida. It built the seven span Harriman Bridge in Tennessee. The Luten Bridge Company is documented to have built 71 bridges in Tennessee.

The Luten Engineering Company was Daniel Luten's own firm during a certain period.

Some of these firms also built other bridge designs.

== Works ==
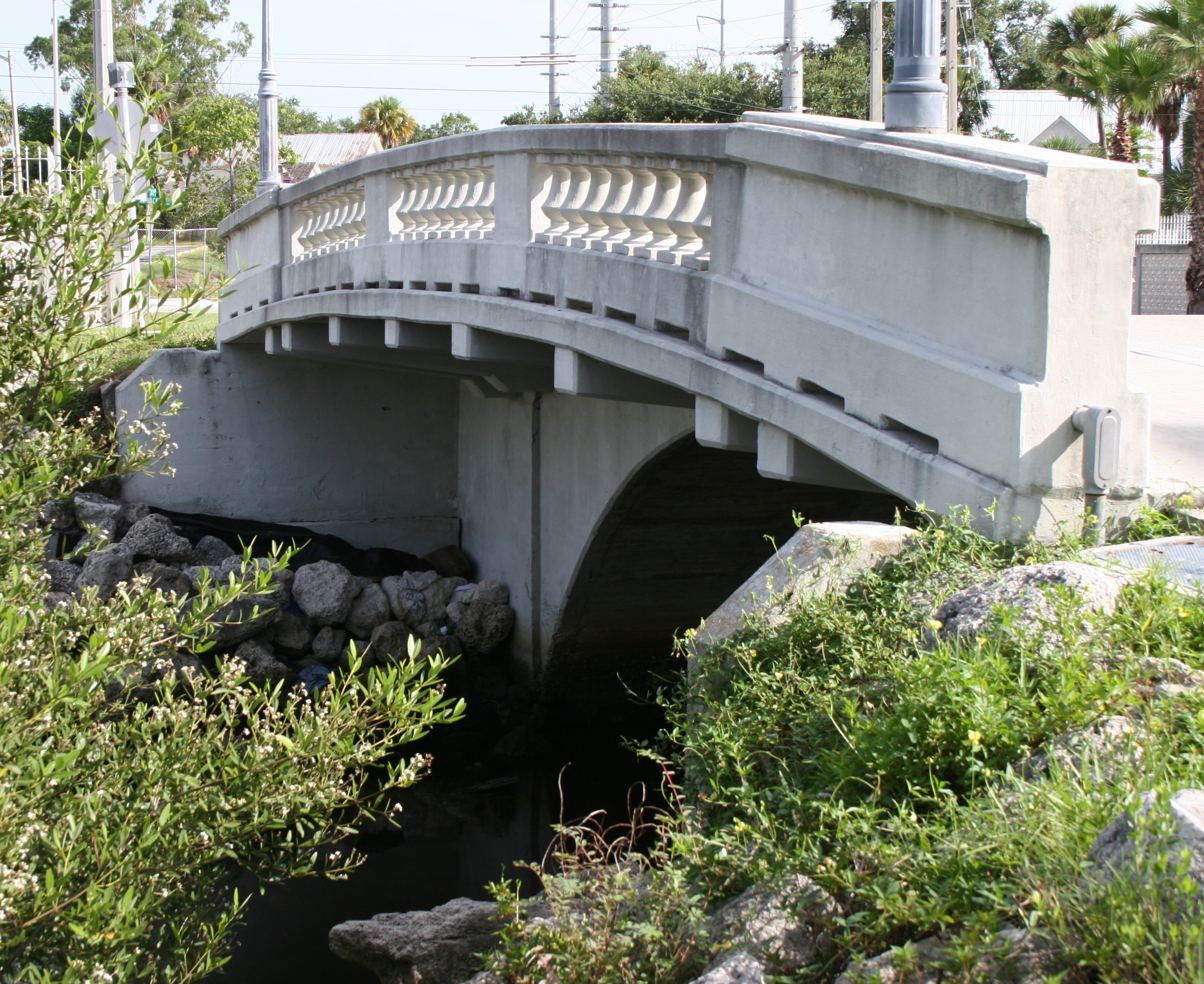
Moores Creek Bridge, Florida, built 1925

Works of the various firms include:

- Arkansas 7/51 Bridge, a Pratt through truss bridge built in 1933, AR 7/51, Arkadelphia, Arkansas (Luten Bridge Co.), NRHP-listed
- Evansville-Dutch Mills Road Bridge, Co. Rd. 464, Dutch Mills, Arkansas (Luten Bridge Co. of Little Rock), NRHP-listed
- Flamingo Bridge, Palmer Avenue, Winter Park, Florida, built 1924. (Luten Bridge Co.)
- Fourche LaFave River Bridge, AR 7 over Fourche LaFave R., Nimrod, Arkansas (Luten Bridge Company), NRHP-listed
- Harp Creek Bridge, AR 7, over Harp Creek, Jasper, Arkansas (Luten Bridge Co.), NRHP-listed
- Highway B-29 Bridge, Cty. Rd. 623 over the Illinois River, Prairie Grove, Arkansas (Luten Bridge Co.), NRHP-listed
- Illinois River Bridge at Phillips Ford, Co. Rd. 848 over the Illinois River, Savoy, Arkansas (Luten Bridge Co.), NRHP-listed
- Marr's Creek Bridge, S. Bettis St., Pocahontas, Arkansas (Luten Bridge Co.), NRHP-listed
- Moores Creek Bridge, N. 2nd St. between Aves. B and C, Fort Pierce, Florida (Luten Bridge Company), NRHP-listed
- Osceola Avenue Bridge, Winter Park, Florida, now demolished.
- Putnam County Bridge No. 159, Co. Rd. 650 W. over Big Walnut Cr., Reelsville, Indiana (Luten Engineering Co.), NRHP-listed
- Ouachita River Bridge (Arkadelphia, Arkansas), built in 1933
- Robinson Road Bridge of Washington County, Arkansas, built in 1926
- Twin Bridges Historic District, Washington Co. Rd. 3412 across unnamed cr. and Old Washington Co. Rd. 11 across Baron Fork, Morrow, Arkansas (Luten Bridge Company), NRHP-listed
- Walland Bridge, Old Walland Rd. over Little River, Walland, Tennessee (Luten Bridge Co.), NRHP-listed
- White River Bridge at Elkins, Co. Rd. 44., Elkins, Arkansas (Luten Bridge Co. of Knoxville, TN), NRHP-listed
- Nowland Avenue Bridge, Intersection of Brookside Parkway S. Drive and N. Rural Street over Pogue's Run, Indianapolis, IN (Luten Bridge Co.), NRHP-listed

== Luten Bridge Co. vs. Rockingham County ==
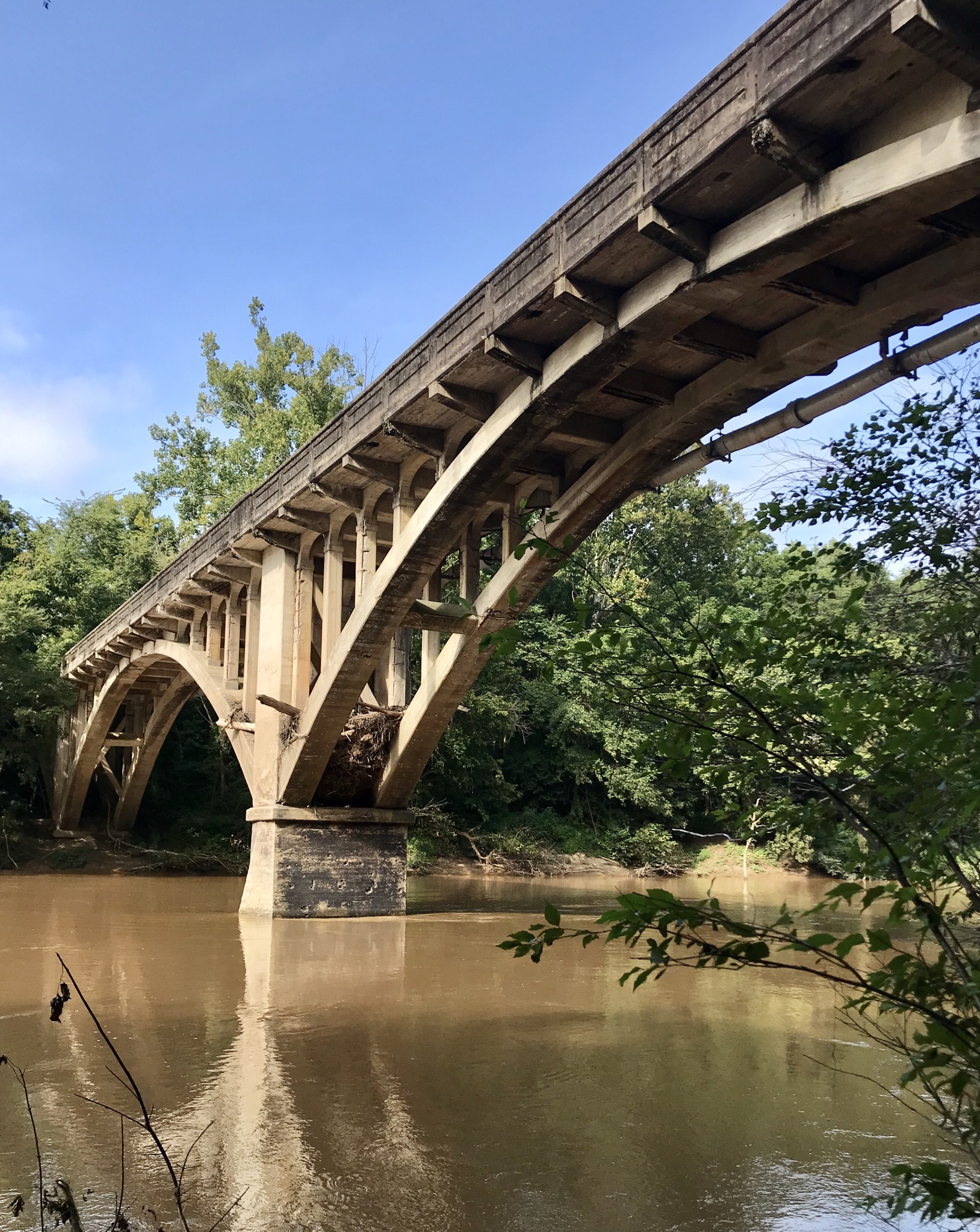
Mebane's Bridge

One of the firms was based in Knoxville, Tennessee and was party to a famously cited case in the history of American contract law. The firm built Luten arch and other types of bridges. The Tennessee Luten Bridge Company was a party in the landmark 1929 court case, Luten Bridge Co. vs. Rockingham County. Rockingham County, North Carolina commissioned a bridge over the Dan River in January 1924 but canceled it in late February. Luten carried on regardless, and later sued the county for the full cost of construction. On appeal, the court ruled in favor of the county, stating that it was the contractor's responsibility to limit costs after a contract has been canceled. The opinion of the United States Court of Appeals for the Fourth Circuit written by judge John J. Parker defined the Duty to Mitigate, essentially establishing that a contractor has a duty to limit costs after its contract has been terminated. The case has been cited in American law school casebooks and law journals.
