= Fourche LaFave River Bridge =

- U.S. National Register of Historic Places
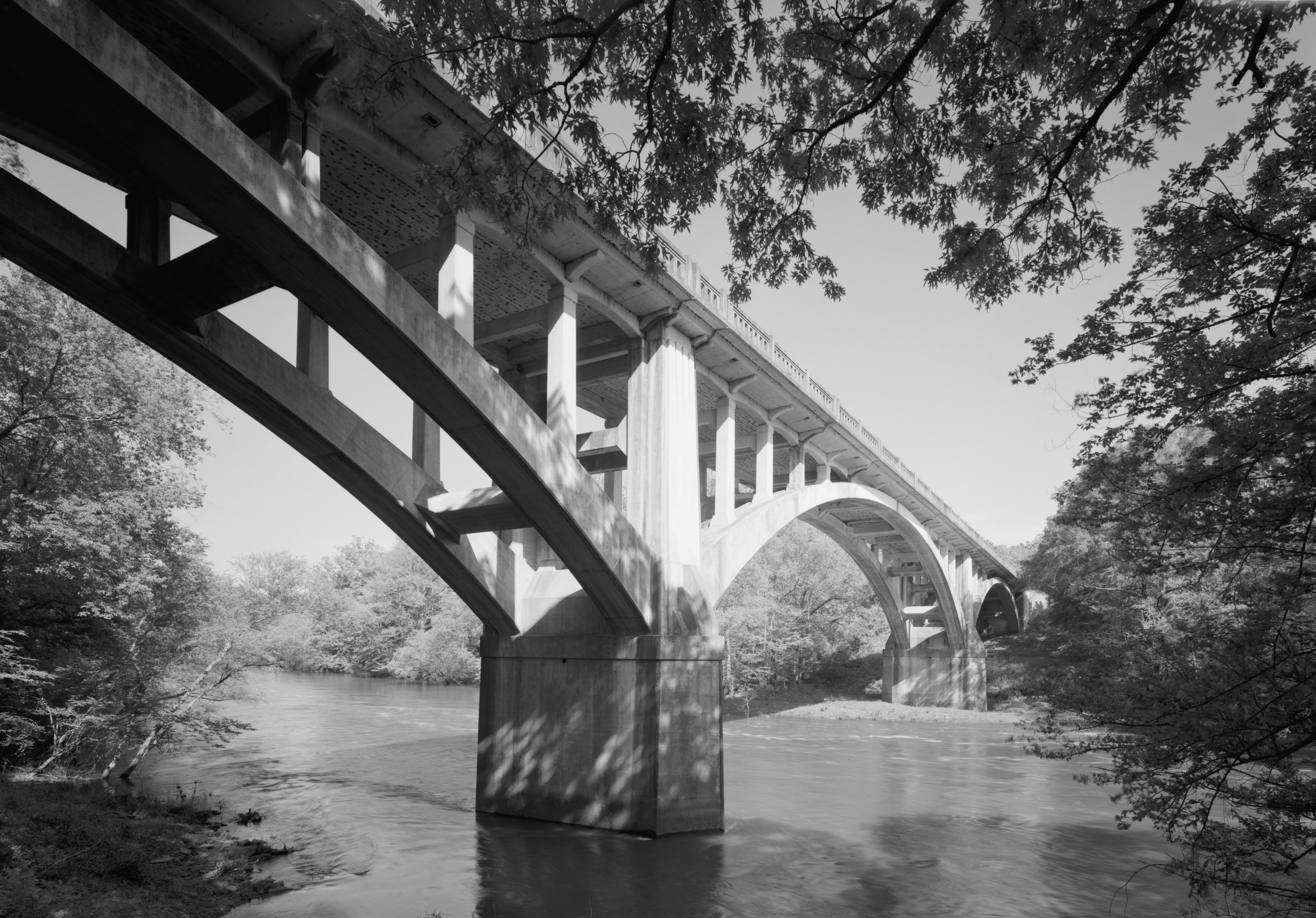

- Location within Arkansas Location within the United States
- Nearest city: Nimrod, Arkansas
- Coordinates: 34°57′7″N 93°9′8″W
- Area: less than one acre
- Built: 1941
- Built by: Luten Bridge Company
- Architectural style: Open Masonry
- MPS: Historic Bridges of Arkansas MPS
- NRHP reference No.: 95000643
- Added to NRHP: May 26, 1995

The Fourche LaFave River Bridge carries Arkansas Highway 7 across the Fourche LaFave River in western Perry County, Arkansas, downstream of the Nimrod Dam. It is a three-span open spandrel concrete arch bridge, with its longest span measuring 184 feet (56 m), and its total length 518 feet (158 m). The arches are mounted on concrete abutments and piers. The bridge deck is asphalt, and is lined by ornate concrete balustrades. It was built in 1941 by the Luten Bridge Company, and is a well-preserved example of style from that period.

The bridge was listed on the National Register of Historic Places in 1995.

== See also ==
- Wallace Bridge: a historic bridge over the Fourche La Fave River
- Ward's Crossing Bridge: a historic bridge over the Fourche La Fave River
- List of bridges documented by the Historic American Engineering Record in Arkansas
- List of bridges on the National Register of Historic Places in Arkansas
- National Register of Historic Places listings in Perry County, Arkansas
