= Seven Gables House =

House in Fort Pierce, Florida, United States

General information
- Location: Fort Pierce, Florida, United States
- Year built: 1905

Website
- https://stluciechamber.org/seven-gables-house/

The Seven Gables House is currently located in Fort Pierce, Florida. On its current site it directly neighbors the A. E. Backus Museum, the Edgartown Historic District and Moore's Creek. The house was re-located from its original site in Fort Pierce, along US-1, in 1998 to be used as a Visitor Center for the city. Relocation included the addition of an accessible ramp (not picutred in photos before the move).

Fort Pierce's location along the Florida East Coast Railway, meant that the area saw a concentration of urban development along the route. The house is a well-preserved example of wood-frame homesteader architecture typical of this period.

Today the house still features the original chimney and much of the original woodwork - including trims, shingles, and brackets.

Photo of the north Side of the house in 2026

Photo of the original brick chimney in 2026

Closeup of the original front door in 2026
