= Illinois River Bridge (Pedro, Arkansas) =

- U.S. National Register of Historic Places
- Location within Arkansas Location within the United States
- Nearest city: Pedro, Arkansas
- Coordinates: 36°10′39″N 94°23′31″W
- Area: less than one acre
- Built: 1922
- Architectural style: Pratt thru-truss
- MPS: Historic Bridges of Arkansas MPS
- NRHP reference No.: 04001503
- Added to NRHP: January 19, 2005

The Illinois River Bridge is a historic bridge, carrying a discontinued portion of Kincheloe Road (once designated Benton County Road 196) over the Illinois River northeast of the hamlet of Pedro, Arkansas. It is a single-span Pratt through truss with a span of 126 feet (38 m) and a total structure length of 206 feet (63 m). The bridge was built by the county in 1922, and was closed to traffic in 2004.

The bridge was listed on the National Register of Historic Places in 2005, and it is one of three Illinois River bridge crossings in Arkansas named "Illinois River Bridge" that are NRHP-listed.

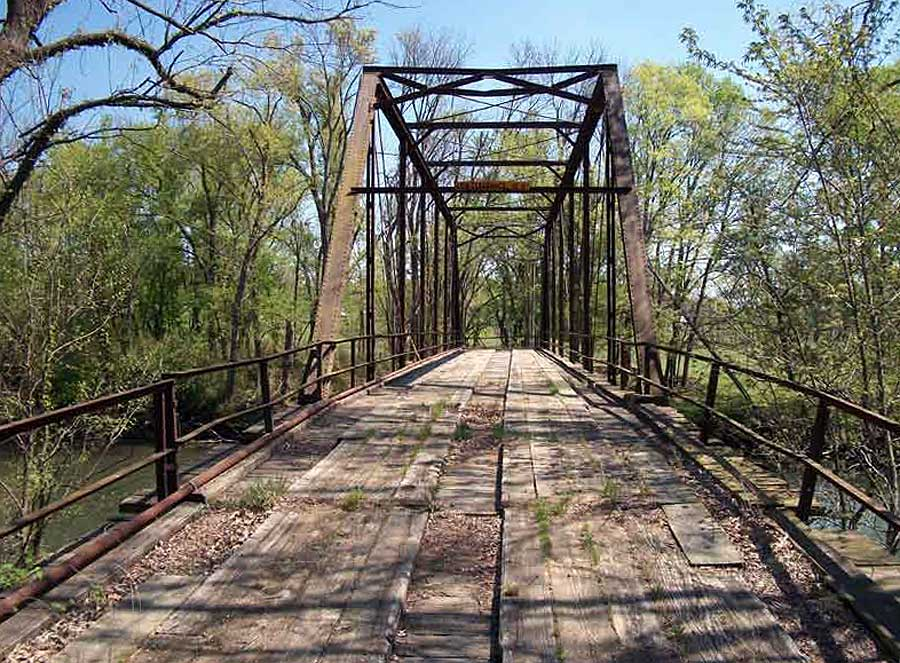
Abandoned through truss bridge over Illinois River on CR 196 between US 412 and Old AR 68

== See also ==
- Illinois River Bridge (Siloam Springs), in or near Siloam Springs, Arkansas
- Illinois River Bridge at Phillips Ford, in or near Savoy, Arkansas
- National Register of Historic Places listings in Benton County, Arkansas
- List of bridges on the National Register of Historic Places in Arkansas
