= Daniel B. Luten =

Daniel Benjamin Luten
- Born: December 26, 1869; Grand Rapids, Michigan
- Died: July 3, 1946 (aged 76); Indianapolis, Indiana
- Burial place: Spring Vale Cemetery, Lafayette, Indiana
- Education: University of Michigan
- Known for: Civil engineer, inventor, and bridge builder

Daniel B. Luten also known as Daniel Benjamin Luten (Dec. 26, 1869-July 3, 1946) was an American bridge builder and engineer based in Indianapolis, Indiana.

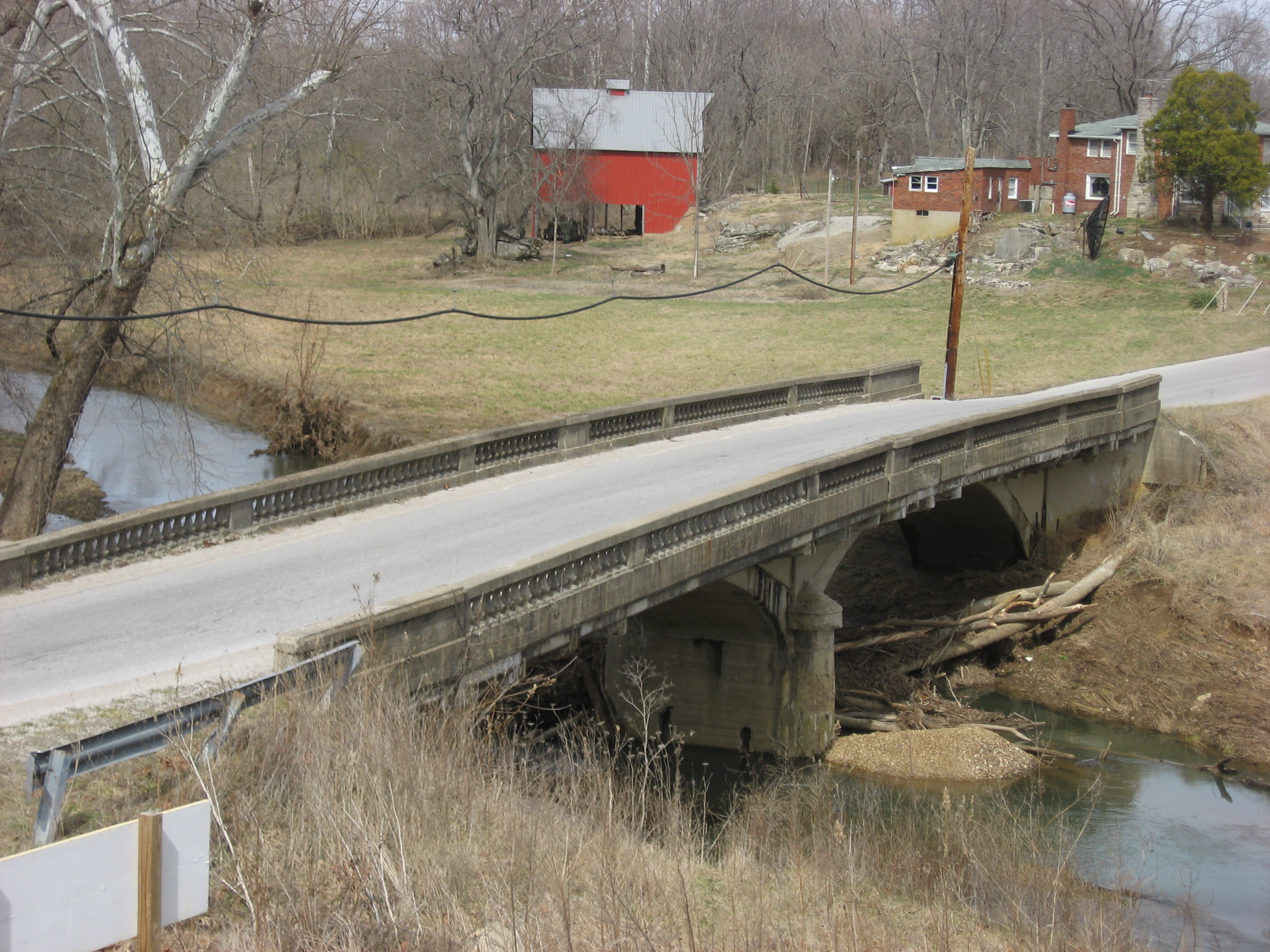
Beck's Mill Bridge

== Life and career ==
Luten was born in Grand Rapids, Michigan in 1869. He graduated from the University of Michigan in 1894, in civil engineering.

For one year he taught Civil Engineering at the University of Michigan as an assistant to Professor Charles E. Greene. He was then an instructor, in architectural and sanitary engineering, for Purdue University from 1895 to 1900, including courses in arch design and theory of hydraulics.

He resigned in 1900 to practice engineering. By 1901, he was focusing exclusively on the design and construction of reinforced concrete bridges. Over the next five years, he designed and contracted and erected around five hundred concrete bridges. Beginning in 1906, he focused exclusively on design and supervision only.

He designed and patented the Luten arch, a type of concrete arch bridge. He obtained more than 30 patents eventually, including various refinements of design that used transverse and other reinforcement which allowed bridges to be lighter. "By 1919, Luten claimed to have designed some 17,000 arches, and stated that examples of his designs could be found in all but three states of the Union. Indiana alone had some 2,000 Luten arches."

=== List of Bridges ===
A number of historic bridges, some of which are listed on the U.S. National Register of Historic Places are credited to him, including (with specific attribution):

- Beck's Mill Bridge, Carries Beck's Mill Road over Mill Creek, Salem, IN (Luten, Daniel B.), NRHP-listed
- Canyon Padre Bridge, Abandoned grade of US 66 over Padre Canyon, Flagstaff, AZ. (Luten, Daniel B.), NRHP-listed
- Carrollton Bridge, Carrollton Rd. across Wabash R., Delphi, IN (Luten, Daniel B.), NRHP-listed
- Dr. George S. Smith Memorial Bridge, 3rd St. across Lehigh R., Easton, PA. (Luten, Daniel B.)
- Dumbarton Bridge (Washington, D.C.), Q Street across Rock Creek Park, Washington, D.C.
- Holbrook Bridge, Abandoned grade of US 70 over the Little Colorado River, 4.2 mi. SE of Holbrook, AZ. (Luten, Daniel B.), NRHP-listed
- Kelvin Bridge, Florence-Kelvin Hwy. over the Gila River, Kelvin, AZ. (Luten, Daniel), NRHP-listed
- Putnam County Bridge No. 159, Co. Rd. 650 W. over Big Walnut Cr., Reelsville, IN. (Luten, Daniel B.), NRHP-listed
- Moores Creek Bridge, Fort Pierce, Florida
- Entry Bridge, Belleview Hotel, Belleair, Florida
- Ike's Creek Bridge, Belleair, Florida
- Winkelman Bridge, Old AZ 77 over the Gila River, Winkelman, AZ. (Luten, Daniel), NRHP-listed
- Wolcott Bridge, CO 131 at milepost 0.07, Wolcott, CO.(Luten, Daniel B.), NRHP-listed
- Miami Bridges, Miami, Arizona five identical bridges across the town Bloody Tanks wash canal, 1921, Luten, Daniel, NRHP-listed

Additional Luten arch bridges are NRHP-listed that are attributed to the Luten Bridge Company or to Topeka Bridge & Iron Co., two firms which had use of Luten's patented designs.
