= Illinois (disambiguation) =

Illinois is a state in the United States.

Illinois may also refer to:

== Places ==
- Illinois Country, a region of colonial America
- Illinois County, Virginia, a county claimed by Virginia during the American Revolutionary War
- Illinois Territory, an organized territory of the US from 1809 to 1818

== Education ==
- University of Illinois Urbana-Champaign, the largest campus in the University of Illinois system
  - Illinois Fighting Illini, this school's intercollegiate athletic program
- Illinois College, a private liberal arts college located in Jacksonville, Illinois

== Ships ==
- SS Illinois (1873), an American Line passenger steamship
- SS Illinois (1917), a cargo ship in service with the Harlem Steamship Co and Compagnie Générale Transatlantique
- USS Illinois (BB-7), the lead ship of Illinois-class battleship, launched in 1898
- USS Illinois (BB-65), a former planned Iowa-class battleship
- USS Illinois (SSN-786), a Virginia-class submarine, launched 2016
- Battleship Illinois (replica), a full-scale mockup of an Indiana-class battleship

== Transportation ==
- Illinois station (DART), a DART Light Rail station in Dallas, US
- Illinois Terminal, in Champaign, Illinois, US

== Music ==
- Illinois (band), an American indie rock band
- Illinois (Sufjan Stevens album), a 2005 album by Sufjan Stevens
  - Illinoise, a 2023 dance revue musical inspired by the album
- Illinois (Brett Eldredge album), a 2015 album by Brett Eldredge
- "Illinois" (song), the state song of Illinois with words by C.H. Chamberlain and music by Archibald Johnston
- "Illinois", a song by John Linnell from the album State Songs, 1999

== Other uses ==
- Illinois Jacquet (1922–2004), jazz saxophone player
- Illinois Confederation, a group of Native American tribes
- The Illinois, a proposed mile-high skyscraper building designed in 1956 by Frank Lloyd Wright

== See also ==
- Illinois City, Illinois, an unincorporated community in Rock Island County, Illinois
- Illinois River (disambiguation), multiple rivers with the same name
  - Illinois River (Illinois), a tributary of the Mississippi River in the U.S. state of Illinois
  - Illinois River (Arkansas–Oklahoma), a tributary of the Arkansas River in the U.S. states of Arkansas and Oklahoma
- Illinois Township (disambiguation)
- Miami-Illinois, a Native American Algonquian language
