= White River Bridge at Elkins =

Bridge in Elkins, Arkansas

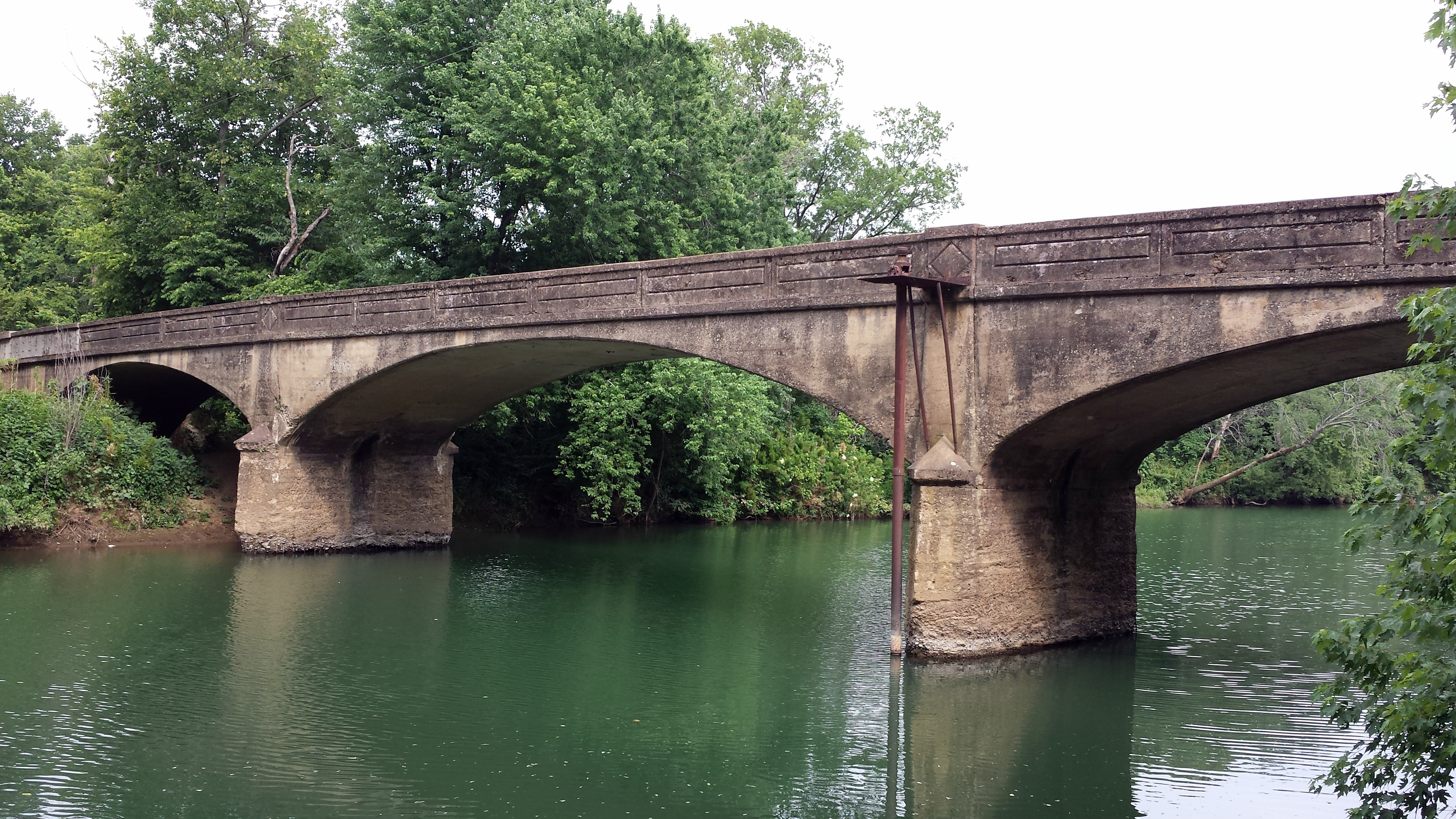
- Facing southeast on the White River
- Coordinates: 36°00′03.2″N 94°00′13.6″W
- Carries: One lane of CR 44
- Crosses: White River
- Locale: Elkins, Arkansas
- Maintained by: Washington County Road Department

Characteristics
- Design: Closed-spandrel Luten arch
- Material: Concrete
- Total length: 204.0 ft (62.1792 m)
- Width: 15.1 ft (4.602 m) (deck)
- Longest span: 71.8 ft (21.8846 m)

History
- Designer: Luten Bridge Company
- Construction end: 1921
- Opened: 1921; 105 years ago

Statistics
- Daily traffic: 934
- White River Bridge at Elkins
- U.S. National Register of Historic Places
- Area: less than one acre
- MPS: Historic Bridges of Arkansas MPS
- NRHP reference No.: 07001437
- Added to NRHP: January 24, 2008

Location
- Interactive map of White River Bridge at Elkins

The White River Bridge in Elkins, Arkansas is a historic structure carrying County Road 44 over the White River in eastern Washington County. The bridge is a patented closed-spandrel arch design called the Luten arch, owned by the Luten Bridge Company of Knoxville, Tennessee, which emphasized strengthened piers and abutments, resulting in a reduced need for material. This bridge has three arches, with a total length of 192 feet (59 m). After construction in 1921, farmers in southeast Washington County were better able to bring their products to market in Elkins.

The bridge was listed on the National Register of Historic Places in 2008.

== See also ==
- National Register of Historic Places listings in Washington County, Arkansas
- List of bridges on the National Register of Historic Places in Arkansas
