= Wedington Woods, Arkansas =

- Unincorporated community
- Wedington Woods' position in Arkansas. Wedington Woods, Arkansas (the United States)
- Coordinates: 36°5′40″N 94°18′37″W
- Country: United States
- State: Arkansas
- County: Washington
- Township: Litteral

Area
  - Total: 1.911 sq mi (4.95 km^{2})
- Elevation: 1,152 ft (351 m)
- Time zone: UTC-6 (Central (CST))
  - Summer (DST): UTC-5 (CDT)
- ZIP code: 72704
- Area code: 479
- GNIS feature ID: 65485

Wedington Woods is an unincorporated community in Litteral Township, Washington County, Arkansas, United States. It is located west of Fayetteville, north of Wedington Drive. A small grass airport exists named Wedington Woods Airport. It is also known for its historic Lake Wedington Recreation Area, constructed during the Great Depression by the Works Progress Administration.
