= Mebane's Bridge =

Road bridge in Eden, North Carolina, United States

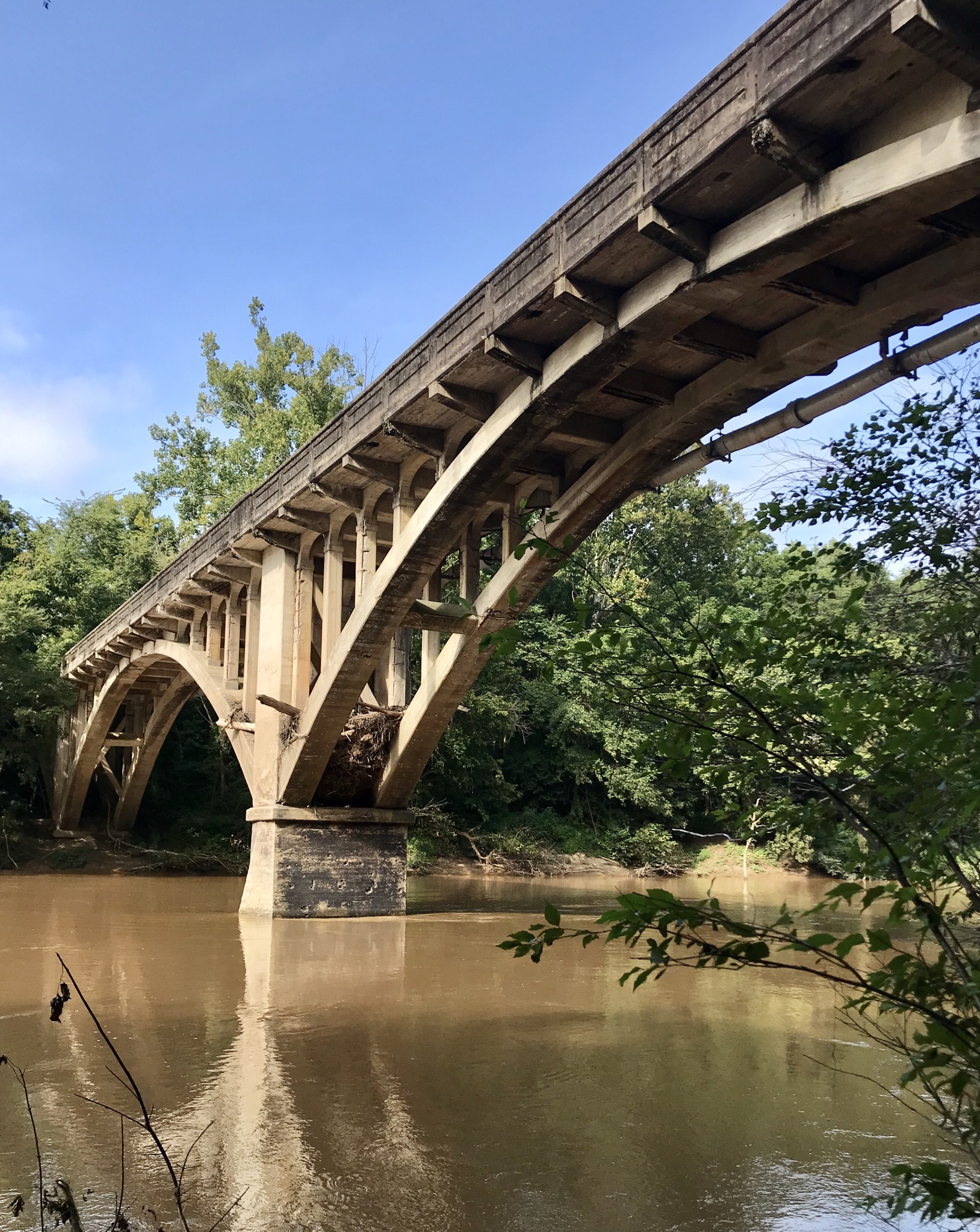
- The bridge in 2020
- Coordinates: 36°28′18″N 79°44′43″W
- Crosses: Dan River
- Locale: Eden, North Carolina, U.S.
- Official name: Fishing Creek Bridge
- Other name(s): Mebane's Folly
- Named for: Benjamin Franklin Mebane Jr.

History
- Constructed by: Luten Bridge Company
- Construction end: November 3, 1924
- Construction cost: $44,000
- Closed: November 24, 2003

Mebane's Bridge, also called Mebane's Folly and originally known as Fishing Creek Bridge, is a single-lane concrete Luten arch road bridge in Eden, North Carolina, United States which spans the Dan River. The bridge was built by the Luten Bridge Company of Knoxville, Tennessee in 1924 under contract by the Rockingham County Board of Commissioners near the confluence of the Dan River and Fishing Creek. The crossing was conceived by industrialist Benjamin Franklin Mebane Jr., who wanted the bridge to be built to connect the nearby towns of Spray and Draper to a tract of land he owned on the far side of the river where he sought to build a chemical plant. Mebane had also assisted in the election of three commissioners to support the plan.

The cost of the bridge, its location in a remote area, and the nature of Mebane's influence on the commission created an intense political controversy in the county. Embroiled in the dispute and subject to membership disputes, the county commission declared that it would not honor the contract shortly after the Luten Bridge Company began work on the project. Urged on by Mebane, the company completed the bridge and later sued the county for breach of contract. The decision of the United States Court of Appeals for the Fourth Circuit in Rockingham County v. The Luten Bridge Co ruled that the bridge firm had a duty to mitigate damages after the county's breach, thus limiting the award it could collect. The case was later incorporated into many American contract law casebooks. With the road intended to link up the project incomplete, the bridge sat isolated over the Dan River for about a decade after its completion, occasionally being used by pedestrians. It was connected to dirt roads in 1935, which were paved in 1968, at which point the bridge was renamed Mebane's Bridge. It was closed to road traffic in 2003.

== Background ==
Benjamin Franklin Mebane Jr. was an industrialist who built several textile mills in northern Rockingham County, North Carolina in the late 1800s and early 1900s. In the early 1920s, he decided to construct a chemical plant in "the Meadows", a large tract of land his Spray Water Power and Land Company owned between Spray and Draper, cut off from the towns by the Dan River. The only modern crossing across the river in the vicinity of this area was the North Carolina Highway 87 bridge. Due to be completed in 1924, it was 1.5 miles upstream from the Meadows. Wanting a more direct route to his plant from the nearby towns, Mebane decided that a new bridge should be constructed near the confluence of Fishing Creek and the Dan River. Mebane's full reasoning for wanting to have a road bridge erected—such as to make way for trucks instead of relying on rail depots—has never been made clear.

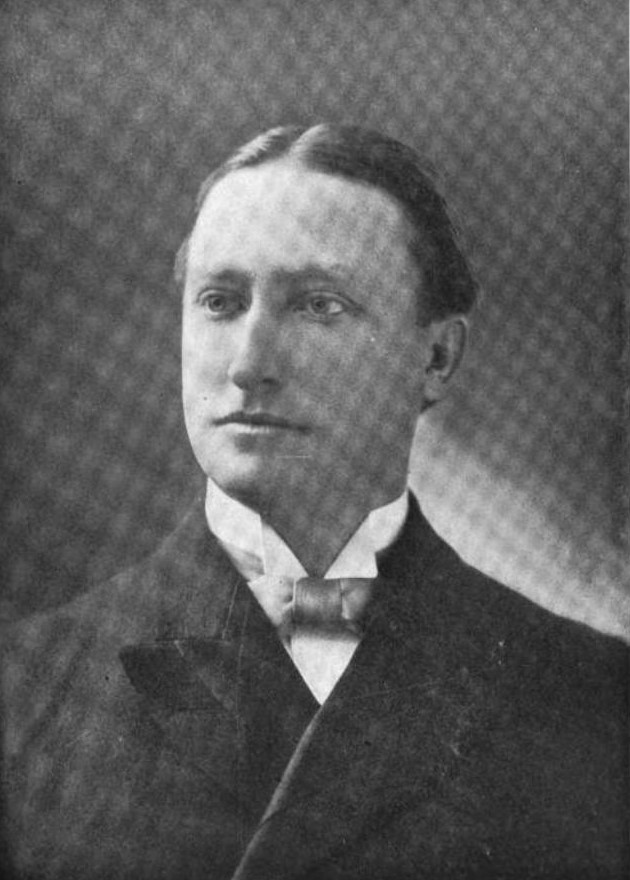
B. Frank Mebane Jr. pushed for the bridge to be built.

Though he would benefit the most from a bridge, Mebane believed that a crossing in the area would broadly benefit industrial growth in Rockingham County and thus thought that the county government should pay for its construction. In 1922, he sought out three men to support his proposal: Josiah Ferre McCollum, Thomas Ruffin Pratt, and William Franklin Pruitt. Local newspapers later asserted that Mebane entertained the three—two farmers and a local merchant—at his mansion to convince them to back his plan. Himself a Republican in a Democrat-dominated county, Mebane quietly helped the three men get elected to the five-person Rockingham County Board of Commissioners that year as Democrats. Shortly after taking office, Pratt, Pruitt, and McCollum formally proposed the construction of a bridge near the Meadows property. The two other commissioners on the board, R.B. Chance and J.R. Martin, expressed reservations, noting that the Highway 87 bridge was due to be completed soon nearby. Undaunted, Mebane's commissioners, having a majority on the board, voted on March 19, 1923 that a bridge near the confluence of Fishing Creek and the Dan River was a "public necessity". They authorized the county to retain an engineer and pay up to $50,000 to erect a crossing at the site. The commissioners also voted to appropriate $250,000 to pave a road from Madison to Settle's Bridge, either as an attempt to build support in the western part of the county for the construction effort or as pork for Pratt, who lived in Madison. Plans that year were also made to construct a $7,000 "River Side Road" running two miles from the Draper Road in the north down the east bank of the Smith River, across the bridge, and connecting to Harrison's Crossroad Road in the south.

The massive outlays for the road construction and an additional school construction program adopted by the commissioners required altering the county's financing. The commission raised the county's tax rate from 0.95 percent to 1.35 percent (with 0.30 percent specifically labeled "road taxes") and issued new bonds with high interest rates, increasing the county's debt by nearly one-third. The tax hikes, the large expenditures, and the apparent cronyism of the bridge project enraged many county residents. A group of lawyers filed for an injunction in North Carolina’s 11th District Court to prevent the commission from signing a contract to build the bridge. The injunction was denied on appeal, and the bridge opponents instead formed a "Citizens Committee" and organized three mass meetings at the Rockingham County Courthouse to protest the project. Speakers at the sessions denounced the bridge plan as a waste of money and as a sign that special interests were in control of the county commission. Discussion of the bridge faded over the following months, with many residents convinced that the unpopularity of the project would dissuade the commissioners from taking further action. Meanwhile, Chance resigned from the commission and was replaced by another anti-bridge commissioner, George E. Barber.

== Contracting and construction ==
On January 7, 1924, Mebane's commissioners voted to contract the Luten Bridge Company of Knoxville, Tennessee for $39,670 to "furnish material for and to construct complete and ready for traffic, a reinforced concrete bridge over Dan River, near Fishing Creek, of three arches 105'0" each with 18'0" roadway". It was named the Fishing Creek Bridge. The final cost of the bridge eventually totaled $44,000. Completed by November 3, 1924, the structure was a single lane road Luten bridge comprising three white arches, each 105 feet long. A plaque at one end named the Luten Bridge Company as the constructor, while a plaque at the other end named the members of the commission which contracted the work, the county attorney, the commission clerk, and the county engineer. The River Side Road project was begun before the bridge construction started. Work for which the county paid $2,000 was done until the bridge contract fell into dispute and the roadway was left unfinished.

== Political effects ==
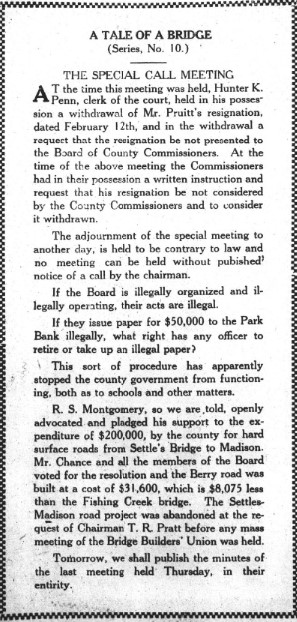
February 1924 entry of the "A Tale of a Bridge" column from the Tri-City Daily Gazette, written in defense of the bridge

County residents were enraged by the signing of the contract, and the political situation became so tense that Pruitt wrote to the county clerk, Hunter K. Penn, on February 11, 1924, declaring his resignation due to ill health. He quickly changed his mind and phoned the clerk's office that day, requesting to rescind the letter. Penn ignored the request and tapped W. W. Hampton, a staunch Democrat, to fill the vacancy. The composition of the board of commissioners thus remained in dispute for the rest of the year. Mebane's commissioners nevertheless ceased to attend any official meetings, while Martin, Barber, and Hampton met on their own accord and asserted themselves as the county's proper government. At their first meeting on February 24, they declared the Fishing Creek Bridge "against the public interest" and directed the county clerk to advise the Luten Bridge Company that the commission "refuses to recognize the said paper writing as a valid contract and to advise said Bridge Company to proceed no further thereunder". The anti-bridge commissioners reiterated their position on March 3, declaring that they would "contest the payment for [the bridge] if constructed."

Despite these pronouncements, the Luten Bridge Company proceeded with the project. The Tri-City Daily Gazette speculated "that attorneys for the bridge company were looking into the legal status of the matter and found that the only safe thing to do, was to fulfill their contract signed by themselves and the commissioners." Mebane, determined to have the crossing completed, arranged for his Spray Water Power and Land Company to give the bridge firm $25,000 in liberty bonds to help cover their expenses. The bridge company wrote a formal response to the commission which read in part, "We are unable to agree with you that this contract is for any reason invalid or illegal, and we cannot consent to its recision [sic] or cancellation or to any other conduct upon your part which will excuse you from the full and complete execution and compliance therewith upon the part of the Board of Commissioners of Rockingham County. We have already assembled a lot of material, organized our forces and performed a portion of the contract. [...] We shall proceed at once and vigorously the construction of this bridge in fulfillment of our contract with full confidence that the county will fulfill its part and pay for the same."

Over the summer of 1924, the anti-bridge commissioners continued to meet and, at every such meeting, would pass resolutions reiterating their rescinding of the contract. Per the agreement's terms, the county engineer continued to report to the commission every month with his estimate of what Luten Bridge Company was owed, and the commissioners would reject the invoice. Political tensions continued to rise and the county attorney resigned. The Tri-City Daily Gazette defended the bridge in a regular column and attacked the lawyers leading the anti-bridge movement, while The Reidsville Review denounced the bridge and its proponents. Pratt, Pruitt, and McCollum eventually sued The Reidsville Review for libel. (Note: The suit was eventually dismissed.) The three decided not pursue reelection to the board of commissioners in November 1924, and Mebane declared that he would support the Republican candidates. With the election devolving into a referendum on the bridge project, a full slate of anti-bridge Democrats were elected to the board with record voter turnout.

== Litigation ==
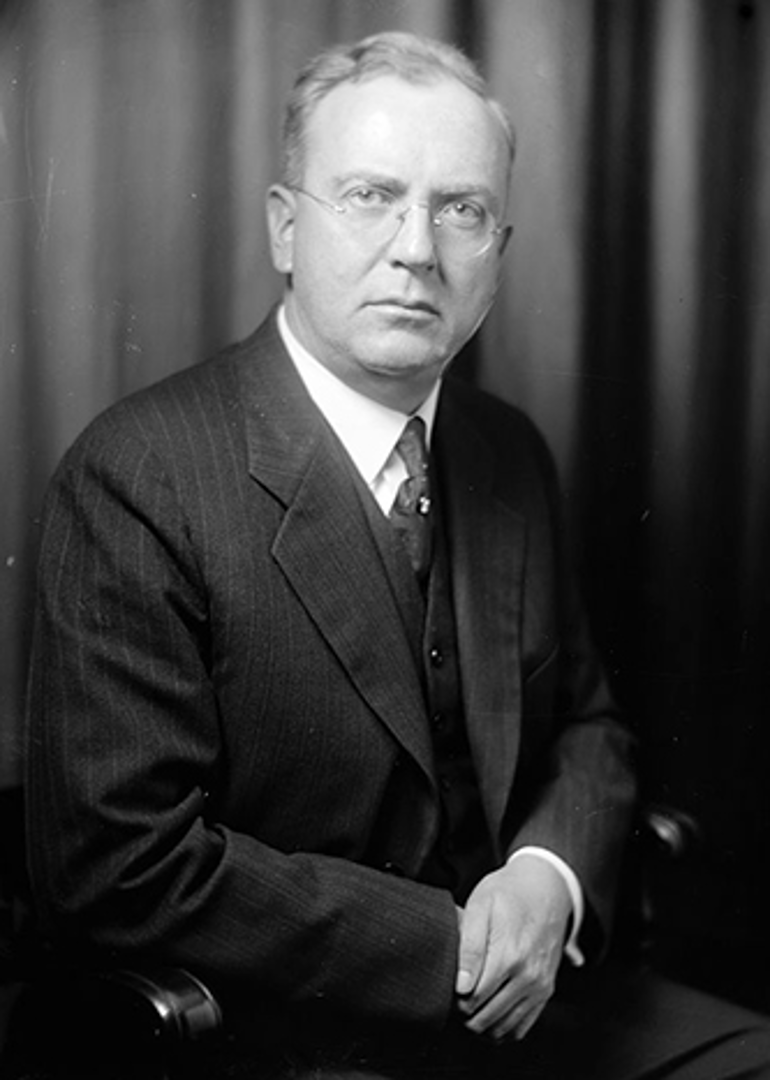
Judge John J. Parker authored the final opinion in Rockingham County v. The Luten Bridge Co.

The Luten Bridge Company ceased work on the crossing on November 3, 1924, by which point the bridge was complete aside from its approaches. On November 24, the company sued Rockingham County and the original commissioners in the United States District Court for the Western District of North Carolina for $18,301.07—the estimate for what it was owed up to that point under the original agreement—accusing the defendants of breach of contract. Three days later, Pratt, Pruitt, and McCollum filed a motion in response. Stating that they were acting in their official capacity as county commissioners, they affirmed the company's case and "asked that the action be dismissed as to them as individuals, and that the defendant Rockingham County be required to pay such sum as was justly due and owing the plaintiff." Soon thereafter, the newly-elected board of commissioners filed a motion to dismiss the case, arguing that the original summons of the court was invalid due to Pruitt's resignation from the commission, and since the original contract was signed due to outsized influences on the board, it was not binding on the county.

On June 2, Judge Edwin Y. Webb ruled that the motion of the original pro-bridge commissioners was a valid official act of the board and thus represented the county's position, meaning it acceded to the Luten Bridge Company's claims. A brief jury trial was held on January 11, 1929, and the court awarded the bridge firm its originally requested relief. In April 1929 Rockingham County appealed the decision to the United States Court of Appeals for the Fourth Circuit, arguing that Webb's judgement was faulty due to his recognition of Pruitt as a member of the commission and the pro-bridge commissioners' motion as a valid act on behalf of the county. The case was assigned to a three-judge panel chaired by John J. Parker.

Parker authored the ruling in Rockingham County v. The Luten Bridge Co. He first determined that Hampton had replaced Pruitt on the county commission and that the motion filed by the pro-bridge commissioners was not authored in a "legal session", and was therefore invalid. Parker then wrote that the Luten Bridge Company was obligated to mitigate the damages from the county's breach of contract and thus could not be expected to receive compensation for work done after the commission had made the breach clear. He then remanded the case to a lower court to determine the final award to which the firm was entitled up to the point of the breach. Parker's decision later became incorporated in many contract law casebooks beginning in the 1960s as an illustration of the duty to mitigate damages in case of a breach of contract. The lower court jury trial ordered by Parker was held in 1932, and the company was awarded $9,280, taking in to account profit lost due to the termination of the contract. In a final effort to recoup their losses, in 1936, the Luten Bridge Company sued the State Highway Commission (Note: At the time the bridge was built, much local road construction was the responsibility of counties in North Carolina. In 1931 the law was changed and the state assumed responsibility for county roads.) for $9,800, asserting that "the bridge cost $44,000.00 and that only $34,200.00 had been paid, with $9,200.00 of it coming from the county and $25,000.00 from the Spray Water Power and Land Company." The suit was dismissed after the company failed to send a representative to a scheduled court hearing.

== Later history ==
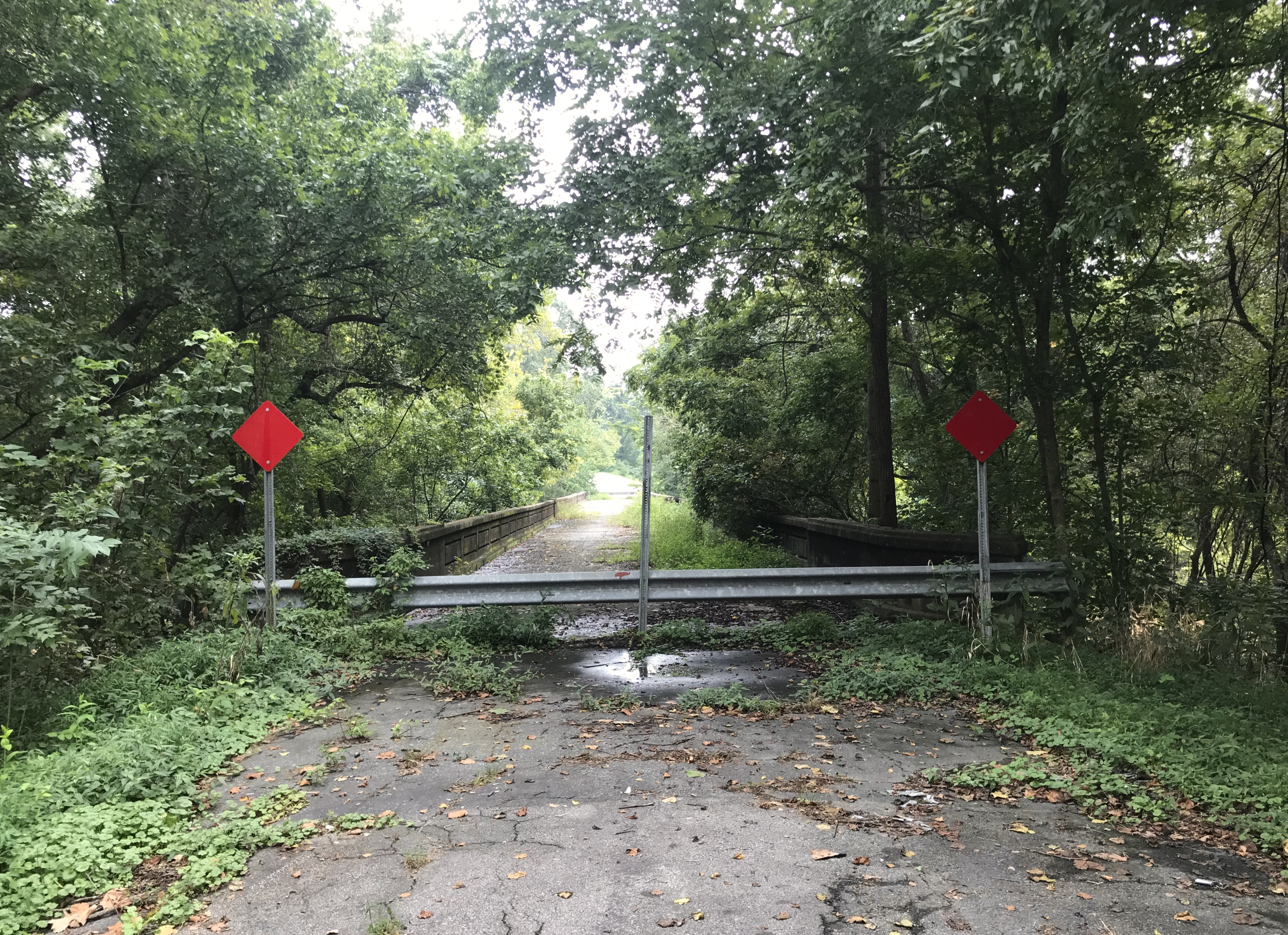
Closure signs at the bridge

The Fishing Creek Bridge sat isolated over the Dan River without any connecting roads for about a decade after its completion. With its approaches incomplete, the only way to mount the north side of the bridge was via a ladder left by the contractor. Local residents set planks down along the banks of the river to form a path to the bridge and used it as a foot crossing. Groups of youth sometimes used it for picnics and parties. In 1935 the North Carolina Department of Transportation built dirt routes to the bridge, connecting it to other roads, but vehicular traffic was minimal. In 1968, the roads were paved and the crossing was renamed Mebane's Bridge. It is sometimes referred to as "Mebane's Folly" in reference to Mebane's determination to have it constructed. A sewage line was later strung across the structure. On November 23/24, 2003 the Department of Transportation closed the bridge to road traffic.

== Works cited ==
- Carter, Bob (June 2004). "The Bridge To Nowhere: The Great Mebane's Bridge Controversy" (PDF). The Journal of Rockingham County History and Genealogy. XXIX (1): 1–23.
- Richman, Barak D. (2007). "The King of Rockingham County and the Original Bridge to Nowhere". Contracts Stories. Foundation Press. ISBN 9781587787218.
