= Harp Creek Bridge =

- U.S. National Register of Historic Places
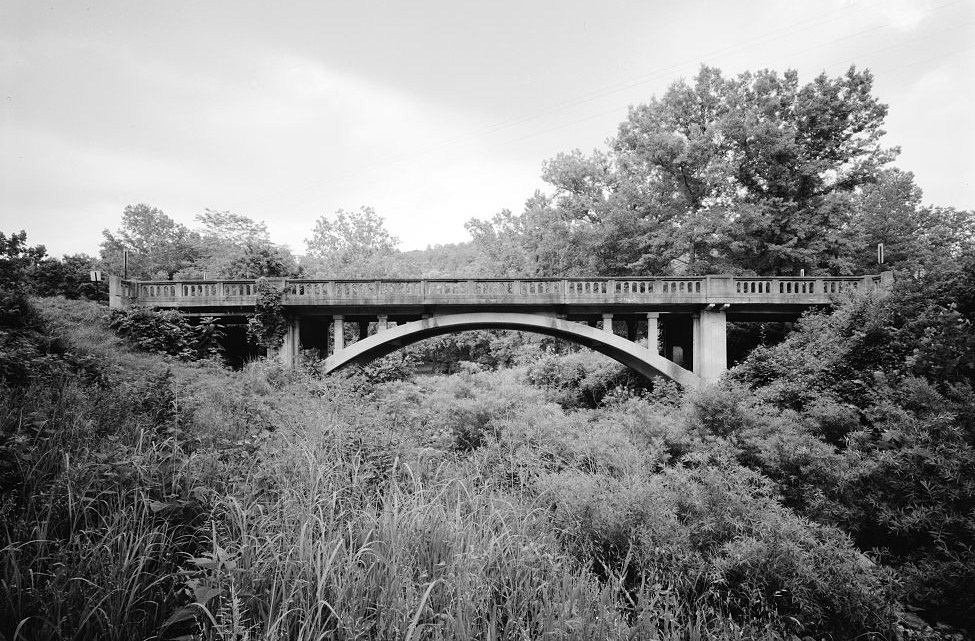
- HAER photo, 1988

- Location within Arkansas Location within the United States
- Nearest city: AR 7, Jasper, Arkansas, vicinity
- Coordinates: 36°4′58″N 93°8′14″W
- Area: less than one acre
- Built: 1928
- Built by: Luten Bridge Company
- Architectural style: Open spandrel, deck arch
- MPS: Historic Bridges of Arkansas MPS
- NRHP reference No.: 90000519
- Added to NRHP: April 9, 1990

The Harp Creek Bridge is a historic bridge in rural northern Newton County, Arkansas, carrying Arkansas Highway 7 across Harp Creek in the hamlet of Harrison. It is an open-spandrel arch bridge, built out of reinforced concrete in 1928 by the Luten Bridge Company. The arches span 69 feet (21 m), and are mounted on piers set 24 feet (7.3 m) from the abutments. The total structure length is 117 feet (36 m), and the deck is 23 feet (7.0 m) wide. Concrete balustrades line the sides of the bridge.

The bridge was listed on the National Register of Historic Places in 1990.

== See also ==
- List of bridges documented by the Historic American Engineering Record in Arkansas
- List of bridges on the National Register of Historic Places in Arkansas
- National Register of Historic Places listings in Newton County, Arkansas
