= Litteral Township, Washington County, Arkansas =

Township of Litteral
- Township
- Location of Litteral Township in Washington County

- Location of Washington County in Arkansas
- Coordinates: 36°06′45″N 94°17′26″W
- Country: United States
- State: Arkansas
- County: Washington

Area
  - Total: 11.3 sq mi (29 km^{2})
  - Land: 11.3 sq mi (29 km^{2})
  - Water: 0.0 sq mi (0 km^{2}) 0%
- Elevation: 1,175 ft (358 m)

Population (2000)
  - Total: 1,410
  - Density: 125/sq mi (48/km^{2})
- Time zone: UTC-6 (CST)
  - Summer (DST): UTC-5 (CDT)
- Area code: 479
- GNIS feature ID: 69794

Litteral Township is one of thirty-seven townships in Washington County, Arkansas, USA. As of the 2000 census, its total population was 1,410.

== Geography ==
According to the United States Census Bureau, Center Township covers an area of 11.3 square miles (29 km^{2}); all land.

=== Cities, towns, villages ===
- Savoy
- Wedington Woods

=== Cemeteries ===
The township contains no cemeteries.

=== Major routes ===
- Arkansas Highway 16
