= Illinois River Bridge (Siloam Springs, Arkansas) =

- U.S. National Register of Historic Places
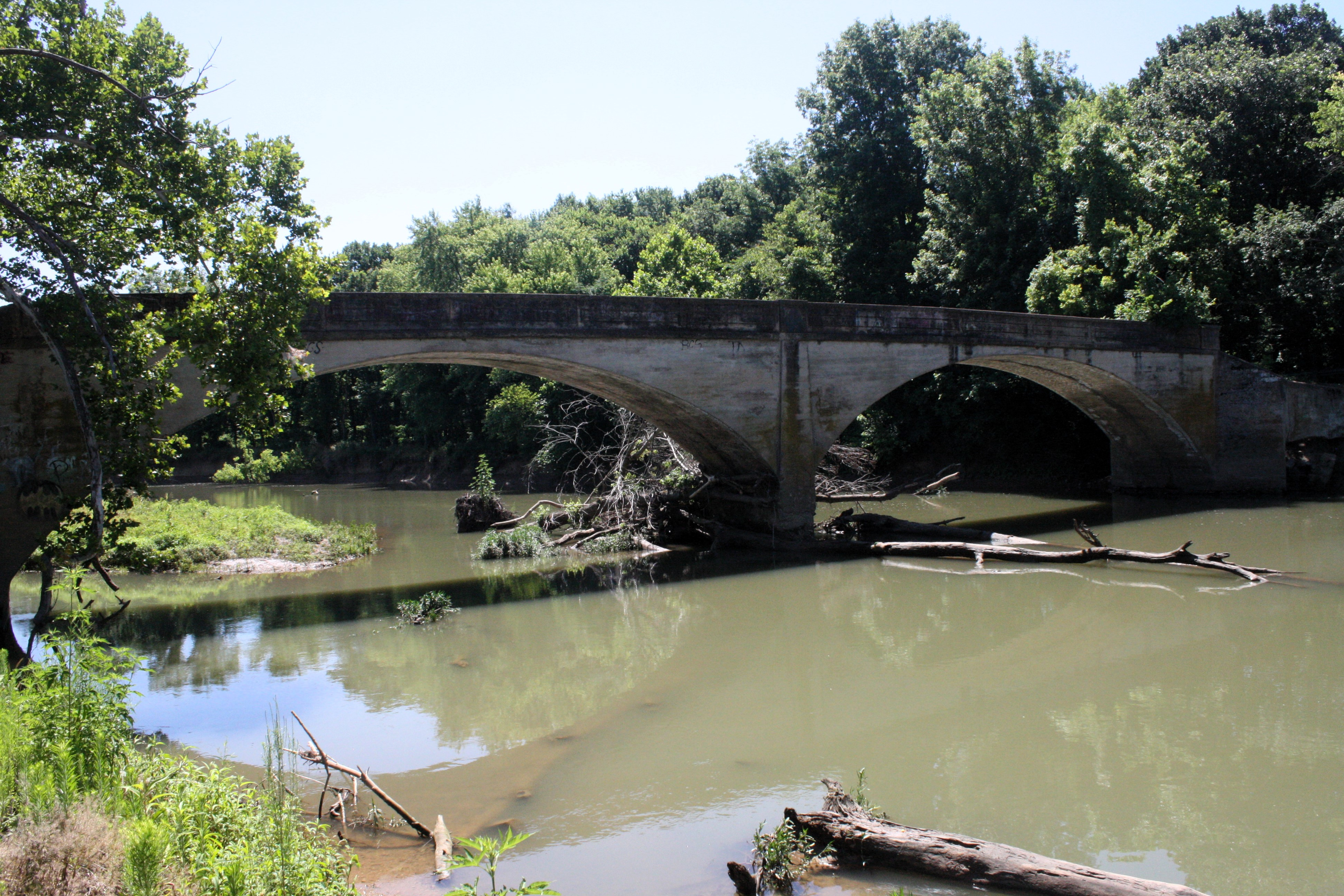

- Location within Arkansas Location within the United States
- Location: 6 miles (9.7 km) east of Siloam Springs, Arkansas
- Coordinates: 36°9′59″N 94°26′1″W
- Area: less than one acre
- Built: 1922
- MPS: Benton County MRA
- NRHP reference No.: 87002420
- Added to NRHP: January 28, 1988

The Illinois River Bridge, also known as the Midway Bridge, is a historic concrete arch bridge near Siloam Springs, Arkansas. It is located in Ozark National Forest, about 6 miles (9.7 km) east of Siloam Springs, at the end of Chambers Springs Road (which it formerly carried) south of United States Route 412. The bridge has two elliptical arch spans, each spanning 68 feet (21 m), with a total structure length of 139 feet (42 m). Built in 1922 by the Luten Bridge Company of Knoxville, Tennessee, it is one of a modest number of bridges of this once-popular and common type remaining in the state.

The bridge was listed on the National Register of Historic Places in 1988. It has also been documented in a Historic American Engineering Record report.

== See also ==
- Illinois River Bridge (Pedro, Arkansas)
- List of bridges documented by the Historic American Engineering Record in Arkansas
- List of bridges on the National Register of Historic Places in Arkansas
- National Register of Historic Places listings in Benton County, Arkansas
