= Wallace Bridge =

- U.S. National Register of Historic Places
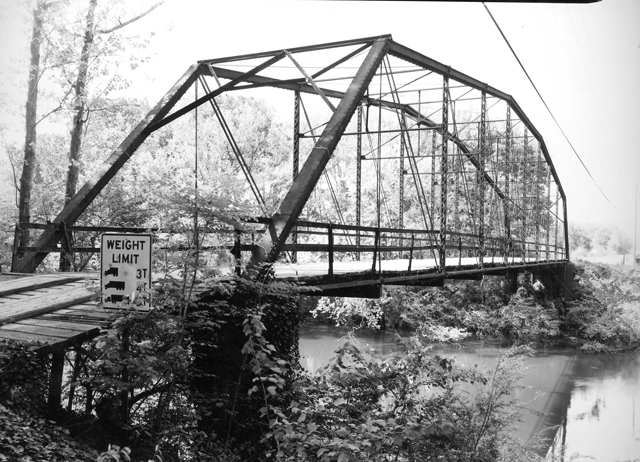
- Historic American Engineering Record (HAER) photograph

- Location within Arkansas Location within the United States
- Nearest city: Nimrod, Arkansas
- Coordinates: 34°56′10″N 93°3′19″W
- Area: less than one acre
- Built: 1908
- Built by: Southwestern Bridge Company
- Architectural style: Camelback through truss
- MPS: Historic Bridges of Arkansas MPS
- NRHP reference No.: 08000724
- Added to NRHP: August 1, 2008

The Wallace Bridge, also known as the Nimrod Bridge, is a historic bridge in rural Perry County, Arkansas. It is located southeast of the hamlet of Nimrod, carrying County Road 18 (Wallace Bridge Road) across the Fourche La Fave River. It is a single-span camelback through truss structure, set on concrete abutments. The bridge has a truss length of 180 feet (55 m) and a roadway width of 15 feet (4.6 m) (one lane). The bridge was built in 1908, its trusses constructed by the Southwestern Bridge Company. At the time of its listing on the National Register of Historic Places in 2008, it was one of three surviving camelback truss bridges in the state.

== See also ==
- Fourche LaFave River Bridge: a historic bridge over the Fourche La Fave River
- Ward's Crossing Bridge: a historic bridge over the Fourche La Fave River
- List of bridges documented by the Historic American Engineering Record in Arkansas
- List of bridges on the National Register of Historic Places in Arkansas
- National Register of Historic Places listings in Perry County, Arkansas
