= Ward's Crossing Bridge =

- U.S. National Register of Historic Places
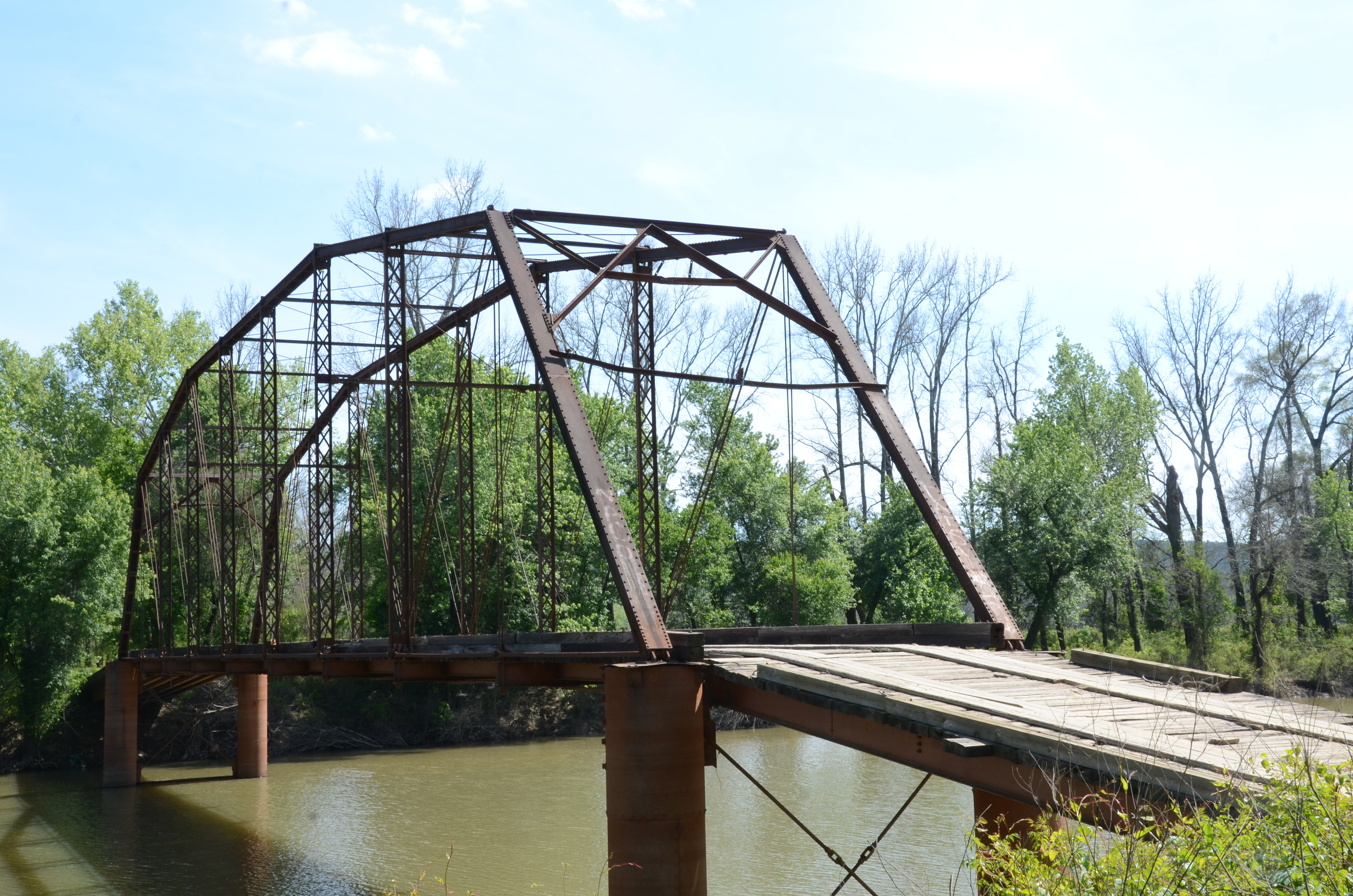

- Location within Arkansas Location within the United States
- Nearest city: Plainview, Arkansas
- Coordinates: 34°56′40″N 93°19′40″W
- Area: less than one acre
- Built: 1905
- Built by: Converse Bridge Company
- Architectural style: Camelback through truss
- MPS: Historic Bridges of Arkansas MPS
- NRHP reference No.: 08000491
- Added to NRHP: June 4, 2008

The Ward's Crossing Bridge is a historic bridge in rural eastern Yell County, Arkansas. The bridge carries County Road 8 across the Fourche La Fave River, south of Plainview. It is a single-span camelback through truss, whose main span measures 160 feet (49 m), with a total structure length, including approaches of 240 feet (73 m). The bridge is mounted on concrete piers, and has a wooden deck carrying a single lane of traffic. The bridge was built in 1905 by the Converse Bridge Company. It is the only camelback truss bridge in the county, and one of only three known in the state.

The bridge was listed on the National Register of Historic Places in 2008.

== See also ==
- Fourche LaFave River Bridge: a historic bridge over the Fourche La Fave River
- Wallace Bridge: a historic bridge over the Fourche La Fave River
- List of bridges documented by the Historic American Engineering Record in Arkansas
- List of bridges on the National Register of Historic Places in Arkansas
- National Register of Historic Places listings in Yell County, Arkansas
