= Evansville-Dutch Mills Road Bridge =

- U.S. National Register of Historic Places
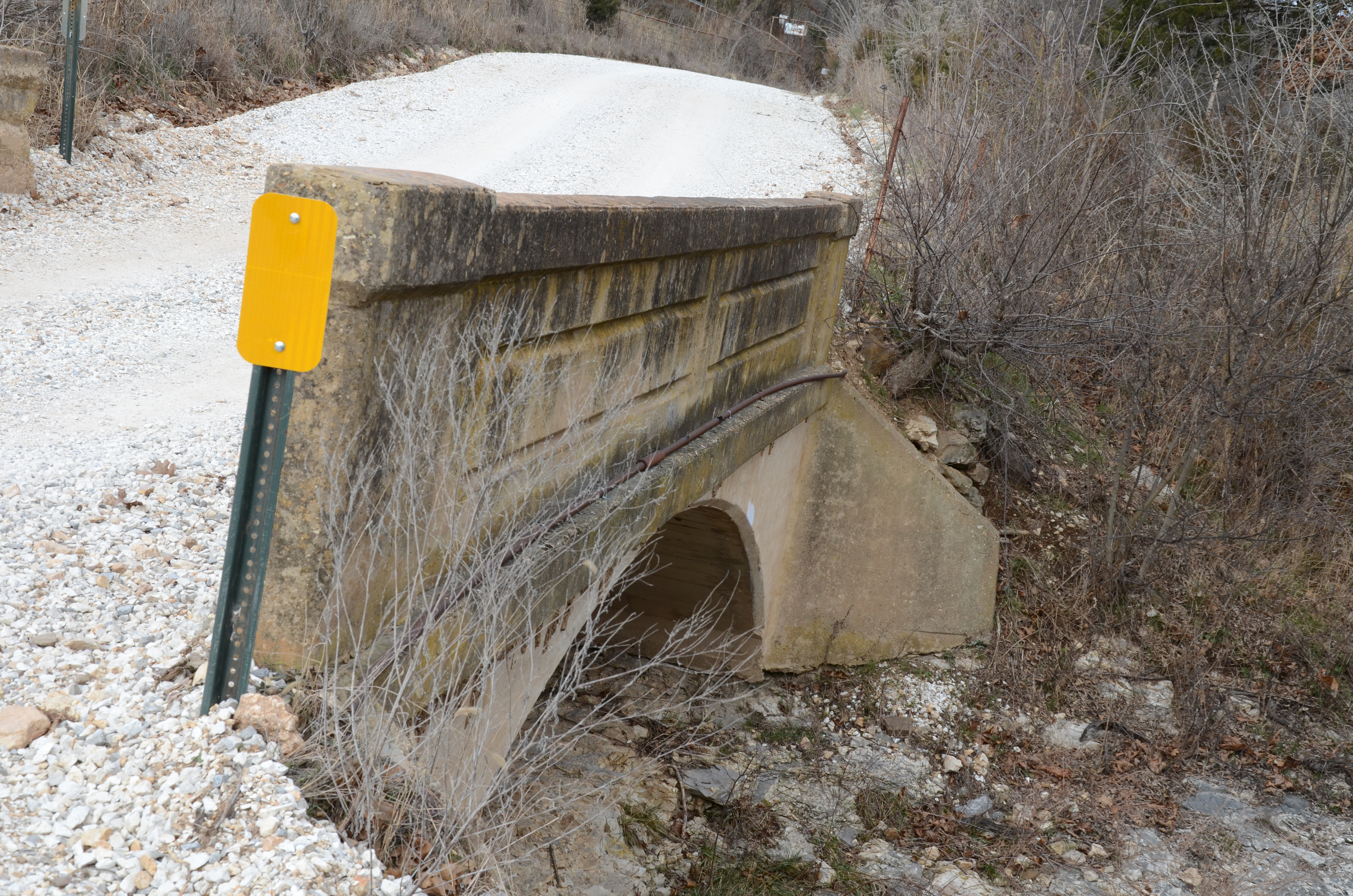

- Location within Arkansas Location within the United States
- Location: Co. Rd. 464, Dutch Mills, Arkansas
- Coordinates: 35.8635°N 94.4997°W
- Area: less than one acre
- Built: 1936
- Built by: Luten Bridge Co.
- Architectural style: closed-spandrel concrete arc
- MPS: Historic Bridges of Arkansas MPS
- NRHP reference No.: 07001436
- Added to NRHP: January 24, 2008

The Evansville-Dutch Mills Road Bridge is a historic bridge in rural western Washington County, Arkansas. It is a single-span concrete filled-spandrel arch bridge, which carries Dutch Mills Road (County Road 464) over Whitaker Branch South south of the village of Dutch Mills The bridge was built in 1936 by the Luten Bridge Company, and was one of its last commissions in the county. The arch spans 28 feet (8.5 m) and the bridge has a total structure length of 30 feet (9.1 m). The bridge was built with a unique Luten Company design that used rings to strengthen the connection between the piers and spandrel walls, enabling a reduced amount of material while maintaining the strength of the bridge.

The bridge was listed on the National Register of Historic Places in 2008.

== See also ==
- National Register of Historic Places listings in Washington County, Arkansas
- List of bridges on the National Register of Historic Places in Arkansas
