= Fourche La Fave River =

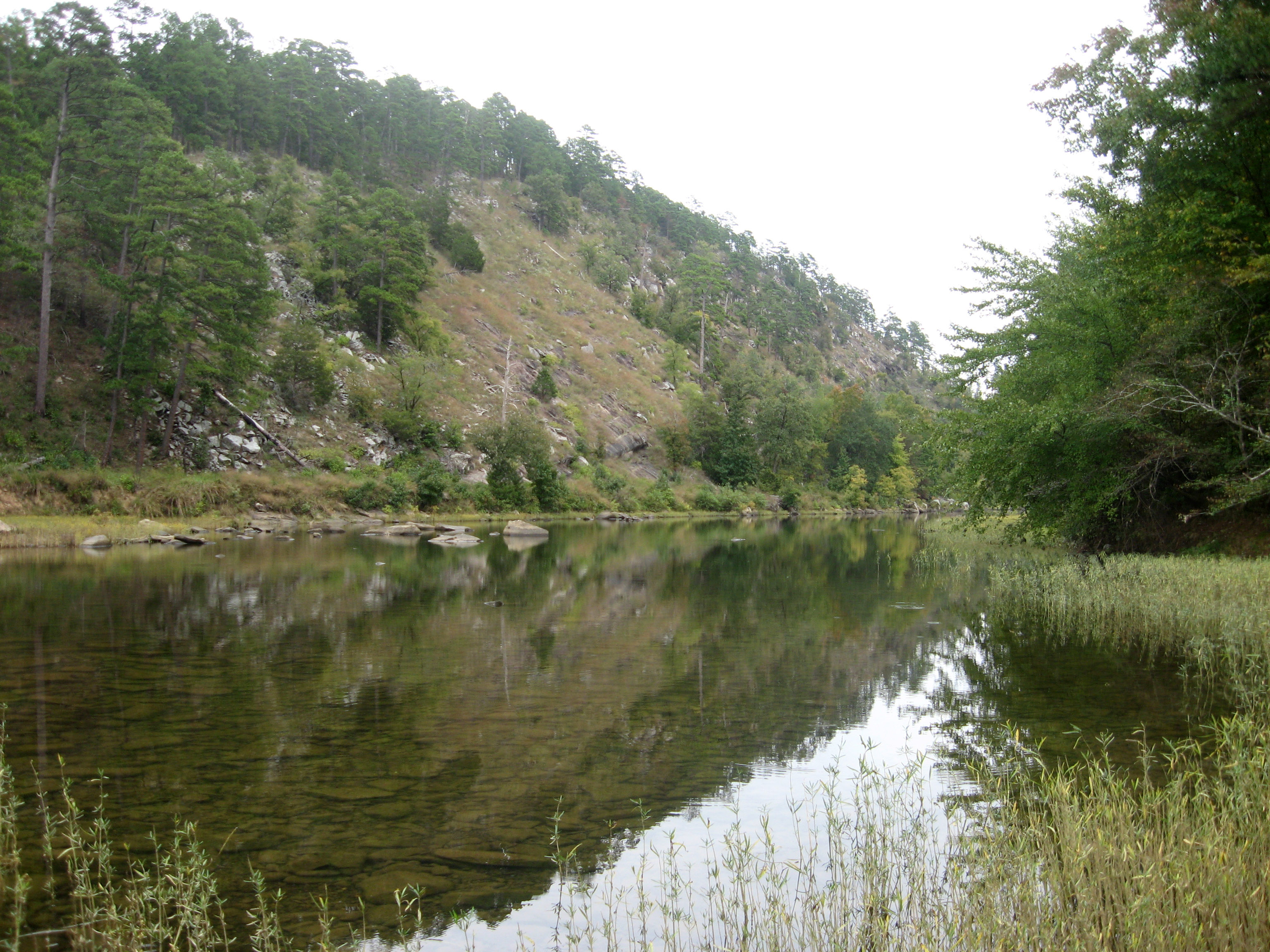

Location
- Country: United States
- State: Arkansas

Physical characteristics
- Source: Scott County, Arkansas
  - coordinates: 34.76883°N 94.15918°W
- Mouth: Bigelow, Arkansas
  - coordinates: 34.96580°N 92.58162°W
- Length: 140 mi (230 km)
- Discharge
  - location: Aplin, Arkansas
  - average: 1,302 cu/ft. per sec.

The Fourche La Fave River (pronounced "Foosh (like push but with an f-sound) Luh Fave"), shown as Fourche LaFave River on federal maps) is a tributary of the Arkansas River, approximately 151 miles (243 km) long, in western Arkansas in the United States. It drains part of the northern Ouachita Mountains west of Little Rock.

It was named for the La Feve family who settled near its mouth. Fourche is French meaning "fork".

== Course ==
It rises in southern Scott County south of Waldron and flows east-northeast through the Ouachita National Forest, along the southern side of the Dutch Creek Mountain ridge, then along the north side of the Fourche Mountain ridge. It flows past Perryville and joins the Arkansas from the west approximately 25 miles (40 km) northwest of Little Rock. It is impounded by the Nimrod Dam at Fourche Junction to form Nimrod Lake for flood control. It is joined by the South Fourche La Fave River west of Perryville.

== Crossings ==
- Fourche LaFave River Bridge: a historic bridge over the Fourche La Fave River
- Wallace Bridge: a historic bridge over the Fourche La Fave River
- Ward's Crossing Bridge: a historic bridge over the Fourche La Fave River
