= Twin Bridges Historic District =

Historic district in Arkansas, United States

- U.S. National Register of Historic Places
- U.S. Historic district
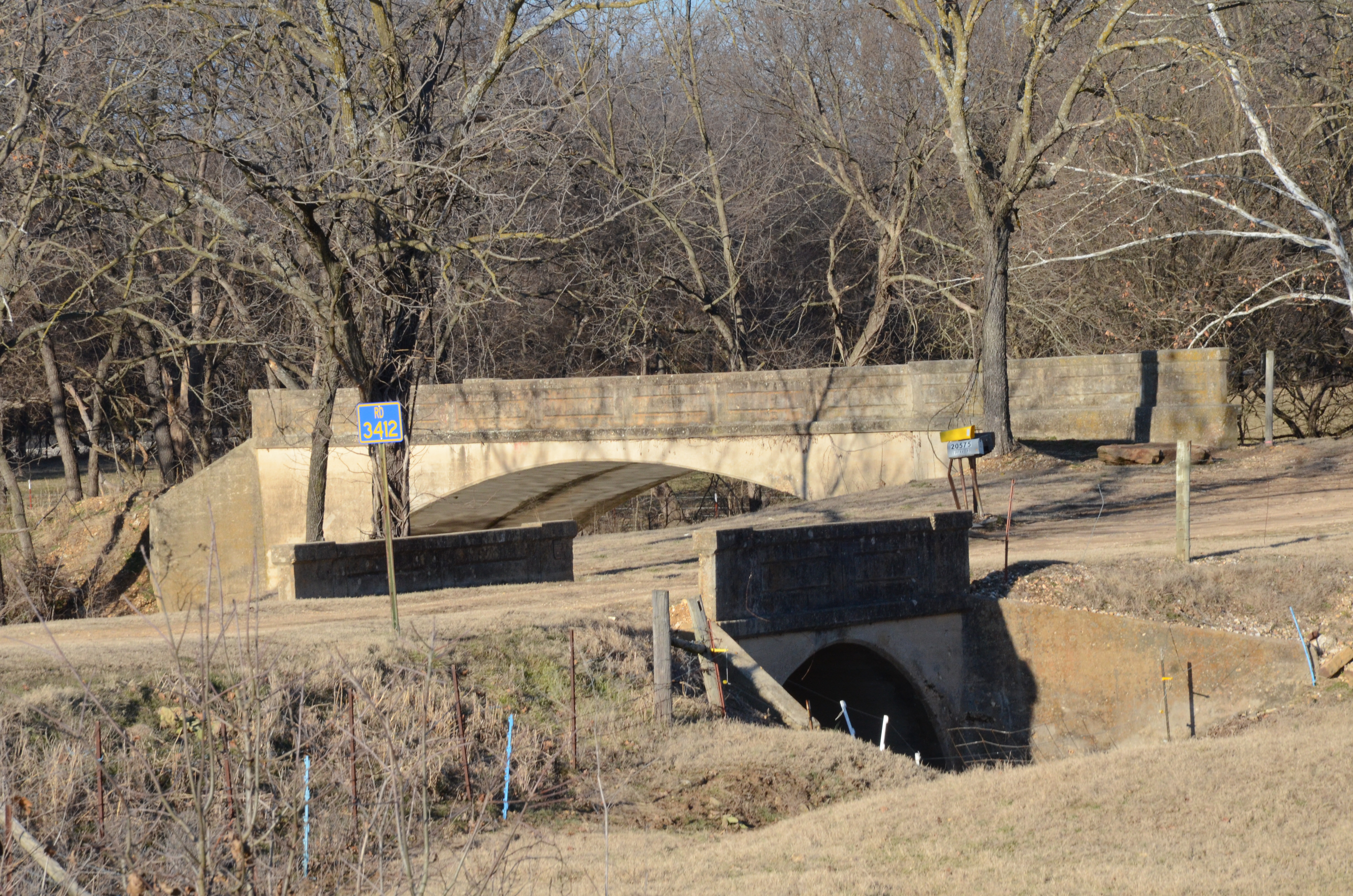
- The two bridges, with the smaller one in the foreground

- Location within Arkansas Location within the United States
- Nearest city: Morrow, Arkansas
- Coordinates: 35°52′35″N 94°27′12″W
- Area: less than one acre
- Built by: Luten Bridge Company
- MPS: Historic Bridges of Arkansas MPS
- NRHP reference No.: 94000162
- Added to NRHP: March 7, 1994

The Twin Bridges Historic District, in Washington County, Arkansas, near Morrow, is an area surrounding two closed-spandrel, concrete-deck bridges completed in 1922 by the Luten Bridge Company. These bridges are located on County Route 3412 and former County Route 11. The district was added to the National Register of Historic Places on March 7, 1994.

== Style ==
The two bridges are both single-span, closed spandrel concrete deck bridges. Formerly both on the winding County Route 11, the route was straightened in 1955 and has now bypassed these bridges on a new concrete facility.

== Construction ==
By order of the county judge, local residents were to construct the approaches of the bridges by themselves to spare expense to the county. The Luten Bridge Company of Knoxville, Tennessee, was contracted for the work and for eleven other bridges in the county.

== See also ==
- List of bridges documented by the Historic American Engineering Record in Arkansas
