= Illinois River (disambiguation) =

The Illinois River is a large tributary of the Mississippi River in the U.S. state of Illinois.

Illinois River may refer to:

- Illinois River (Arkansas–Oklahoma), a tributary of the Arkansas River, in Arkansas and Oklahoma in the United States
- Illinois River (Oregon), a tributary of the Rogue River, in Oregon in the United States
- Illinois River (Colorado) a tributary of the Michigan River, in Jackson County, Colorado in the United States

== See also ==
- Illinois (disambiguation)
- Illinois River Bridge (disambiguation)
- List of rivers of Illinois
