= Pedro, Arkansas =

Unincorporated community in Arkansas, US

Coordinates: 36°10′06″N 94°24′15″W

Pedro is an unincorporated community in Benton County, Arkansas, United States.

Pedro is close to the confluence of the Osage Creek and the Illinois River.

== Illinois River Bridge ==
Pedro is the location of (or is the nearest community to) Illinois River Bridge, which is located on County Road 196 (Kincheloe Rd.) approx. 0.25 mi. S of old AR 68 and is listed on the National Register of Historic Places.
