= Highway B-29 Bridge =

- U.S. National Register of Historic Places
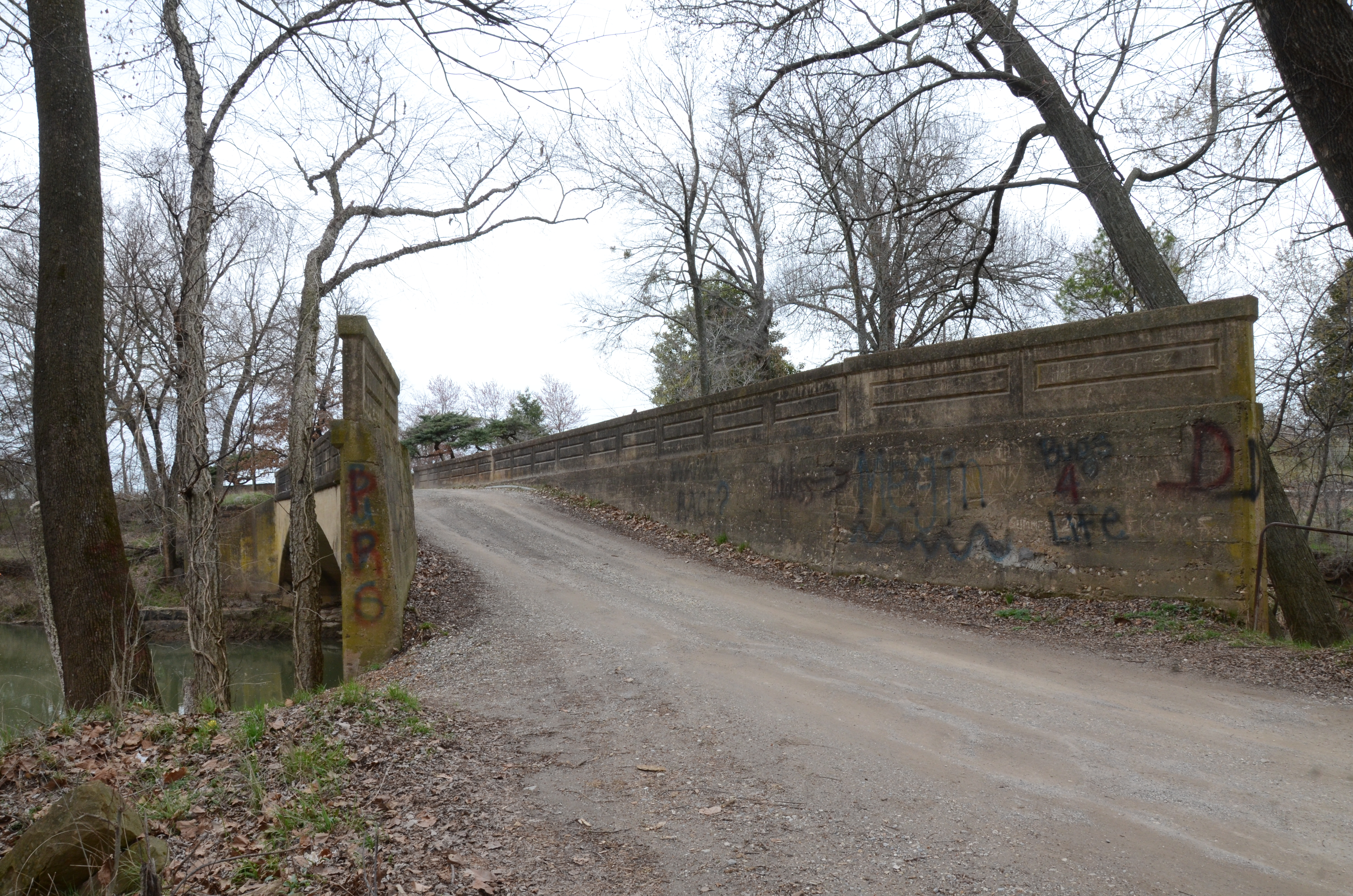

- Location within Arkansas Location within the United States
- Location: Cty. Rd. 623 over the Illinois River, Prairie Grove, Arkansas
- Coordinates: 35°59′48″N 94°17′53″W
- Area: less than one acre
- Built: 1923
- Built by: Luten Bridge Co.
- Architectural style: Closed-spandrel arch
- MPS: Historic Bridges of Arkansas MPS
- NRHP reference No.: 08000945
- Added to NRHP: September 24, 2008

The Highway B-29 Bridge is a historic bridge in Prairie Grove, Arkansas. It is a single-span concrete arch bridge, carrying Washington County Route 623 across the Illinois River. The arch has a span of 97 feet (30 m), and the total structure length is 100 feet (30 m). Its deck is 17 feet (5.2 m) wide, and the bridge is typically 20 feet (6.1 m) above the water. Built in 1923, the bridge is one of the first built in the county by the Luten Bridge Company, which used an innovative technique involving metal rings (polished for visual effect on this bridge) that reduced the amount of material required for the structure.

The bridge was listed on the National Register of Historic Places in 2008.

== See also ==
- National Register of Historic Places listings in Washington County, Arkansas
- List of bridges on the National Register of Historic Places in Arkansas
