= Nimrod, Arkansas =

- Unincorporated community
- Location within Arkansas Location within the United States
- Coordinates: 34°57′33″N 93°04′36″W
- Country: United States
- State: Arkansas
- County: Perry
- Elevation: 397 ft (121 m)
- Time zone: UTC-6 (Central (CST))
  - Summer (DST): UTC-5 (CDT)
- Area code: 501
- GNIS feature ID: 72870

Nimrod is an unincorporated community in Perry County, Arkansas, United States. The community is located along Arkansas Highway 60, 16 miles (26 km) west-southwest of Perryville.

The Fourche LaFave River Bridge and the Wallace Bridge, which are listed on the National Register of Historic Places, are near the community.
