= Nimrod Lake =

Lake in Arkansas, United States

- Location within Arkansas
- Location: Perry / Yell counties, Arkansas, United States
- Coordinates: 34.9509481°N 93.2435690°W
- Type: reservoir
- Primary inflows: Fourche LaFave River
- Primary outflows: Fourche LaFave River
- Basin countries: United States

Nimrod Lake is a reservoir in western Arkansas, created by the construction of the Nimrod Dam. It is the oldest Corps of Engineers project in Arkansas, and was completed in 1942 on the Fourche LaFave River.

== Overview ==
The lake is popular for sportsmen, mainly fishermen and hunters. The most common fish caught are crappie, largemouth bass, bream, white bass, and catfish. Recreation is also popular, especially water skiing, swimming, and boating. The Fourche LaFave River has its headwaters near Y City, Arkansas, and Boles. Fourche means fork in the French language, and LaFave is supposed to have been a French family that lived in the area. Nimrod Lake was named after Nimrod, the great grandson of Noah. Nimrod was a mighty hunter, and the lake was named after him because of the wildlife that surrounds the lake. Nimrod Lake is adjacent to the Scenic Byway 7 and is located between the Ouachita National Forest and the Ozark National Forest.

== Project history ==
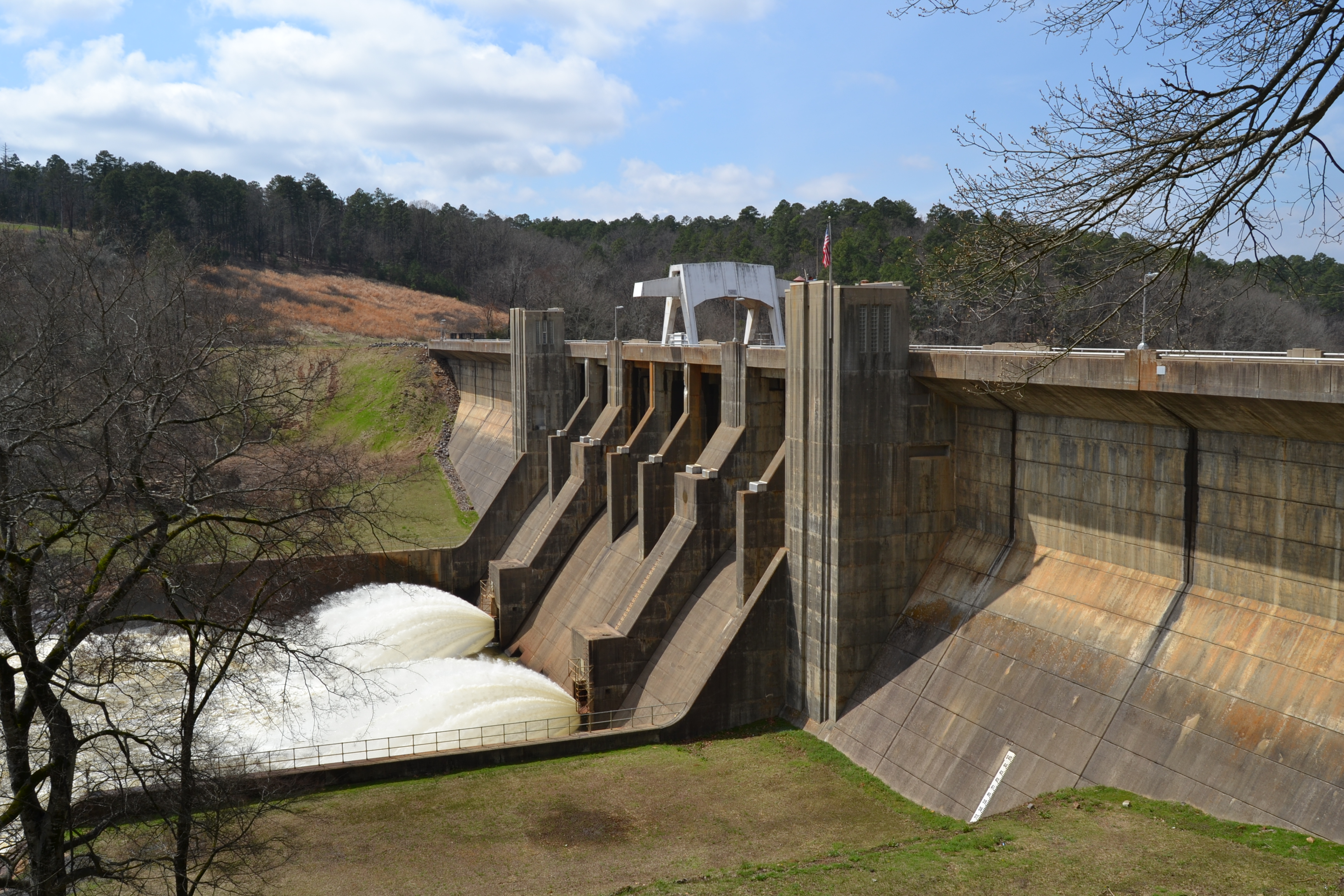
Nimrod Dam

Nimrod Dam was constructed during the end of the Great Depression, and the beginning of World War II. Nimrod Lake was authorized by the Flood Control Act of 1938. Engineers started preparing for a dam site in late 1939, preparing for the construction of the dam began in early 1940, and the actual construction started in mid-1940. Construction continued after the start of World War 2, and ended in March 1942. Nimrod Lake was the first lake made by the Little Rock District of the Corps of Engineers, and the first Corp lake in Arkansas. The total cost of the project was $3,773,000 ($125,880,000 in current value). Once the lake was completed, recreational opportunities became possible. Although recreation was not part of the project, it later became a significant part of Nimrod Lake. Camping, swimming, boating, and hunting are now popular activities on the lake. Nimrod Lake celebrated its golden anniversary in June 1992, the celebration honored the former construction workers, engineers, and contractors who helped make the lake possible.

== See also ==
- List of Arkansas dams and reservoirs
