= Illinois Township =

Illinois Township may refer to:

- Illinois Township, Pope County, Arkansas
- Illinois Township, Washington County, Arkansas
- Illinois Township, Sedgwick County, Kansas
- Illinois Township, Sumner County, Kansas

== See also ==
- List of Illinois townships
