= Putnam County Bridge No. 159 =

- U.S. National Register of Historic Places
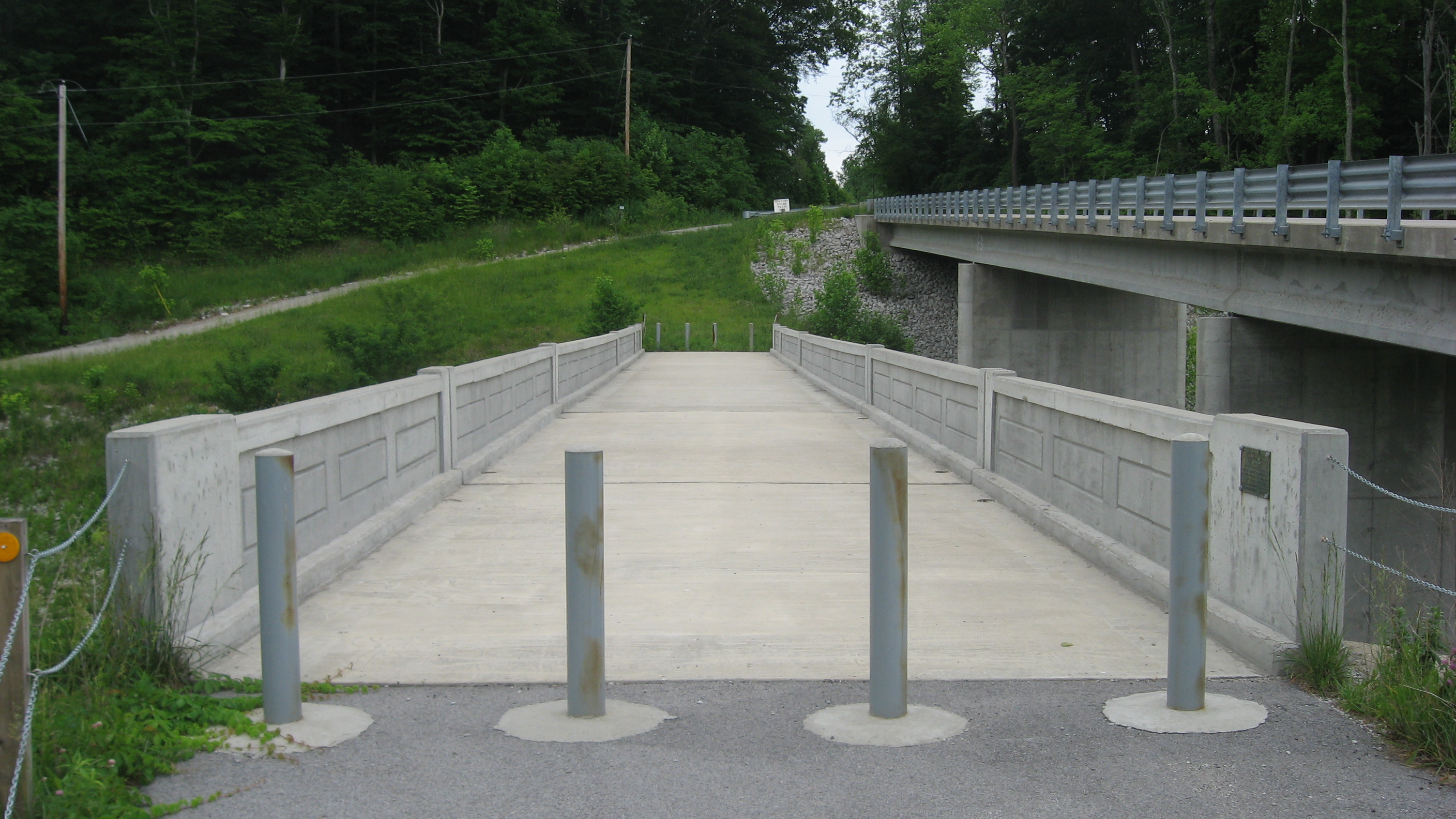
- Putnam County Bridge No. 159, June 2011

- Location within Indiana Location within the United States
- Location: Co. Rd. 650 W. over Big Walnut Cr., Reelsville, Indiana
- Coordinates: 39°33′17″N 86°57′51″W
- Area: less than one acre
- Built: 1929
- Built by: Luten Engineering Co.
- Architect: Luten, Daniel B.
- Architectural style: Open spandrel
- NRHP reference No.: 99000302
- Added to NRHP: March 12, 1999

Putnam County Bridge No. 159, also known as the Reelsville Bridge, is a historic Open spandrel bridge located in Washington Township, Putnam County, Indiana. It was designed by noted bridge architect Daniel B. Luten and built in 1929, and replaced an earlier truss and covered bridge. It measures 171 feet, 6 inches, long and consists of five reinforced concrete approaches and a 120 feet, 6 inch, open spandrel span at the center.

It was listed on the National Register of Historic Places in 1999.
