= Wedington Drive =

Wedington Drive is a city street in Fayetteville, Arkansas carrying two Arkansas state highway designations:

- Arkansas Highway 16, the state highway designation west of Interstate 49 (I-49)
- Arkansas Highway 112 Spur, the state highway designation east of I-49
