= Luten arch =

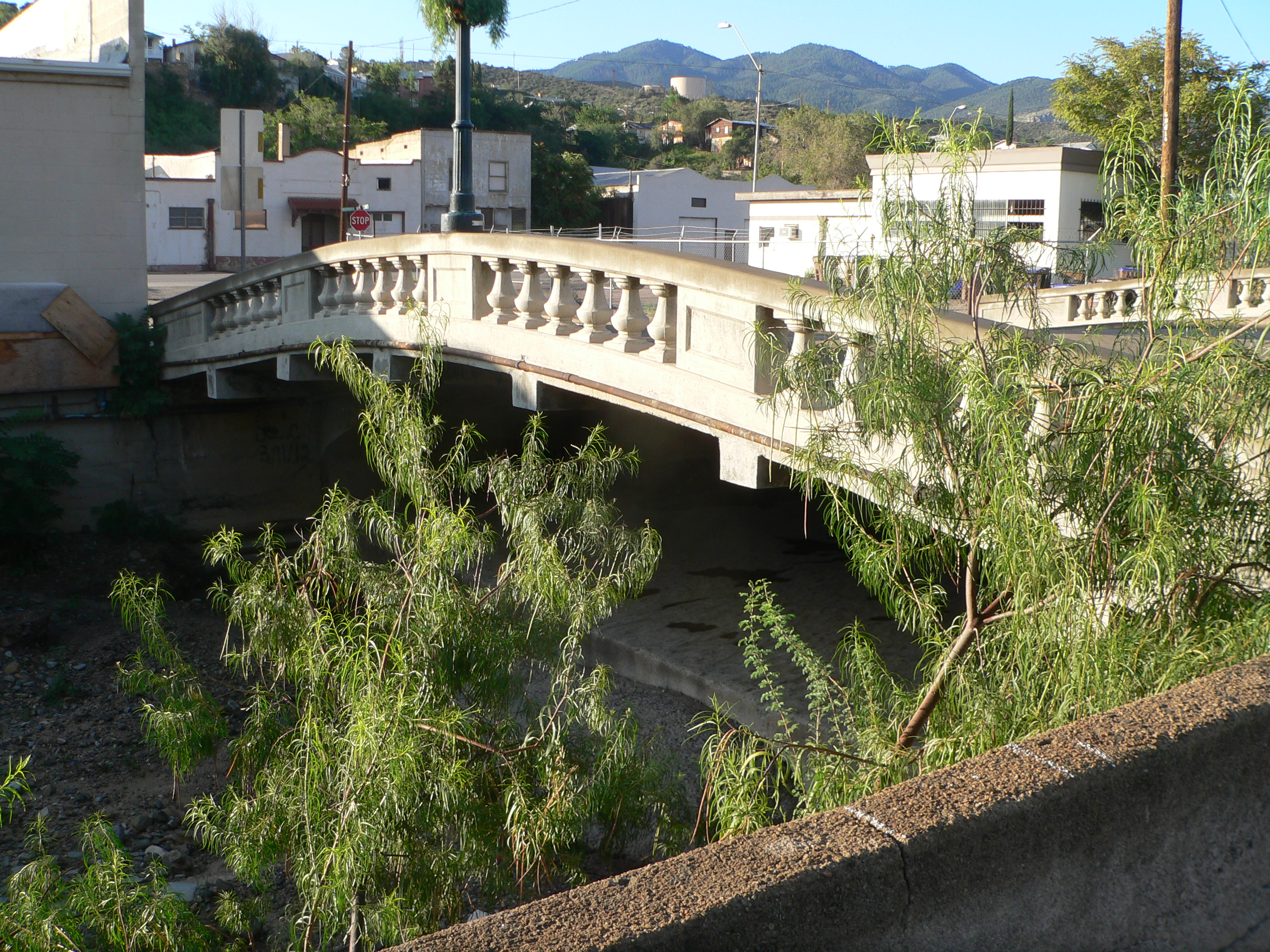
A Luten Arch bridge in Miami, Arizona, built in 1918

A Luten arch is a patented concrete arch design for bridges, designed by Daniel B. Luten, of Indianapolis. Luten was awarded more than 30 patents for his improvements of the Luten arch design.

The Luten arch improves upon preceding concrete arch designs by strategic use of reinforcement where needed to address tension of load upon the bridge. This enables bridges to be considerably lighter.

The Luten Bridge Company was one seller of the designs. The Topeka Bridge & Iron Co. was a western seller of the designs.

According to Luten, by 1919 he had designed more than 17,000 Luten arch bridges, and there were examples in all but three US states.
