= Savoy, Arkansas =

- Unincorporated community
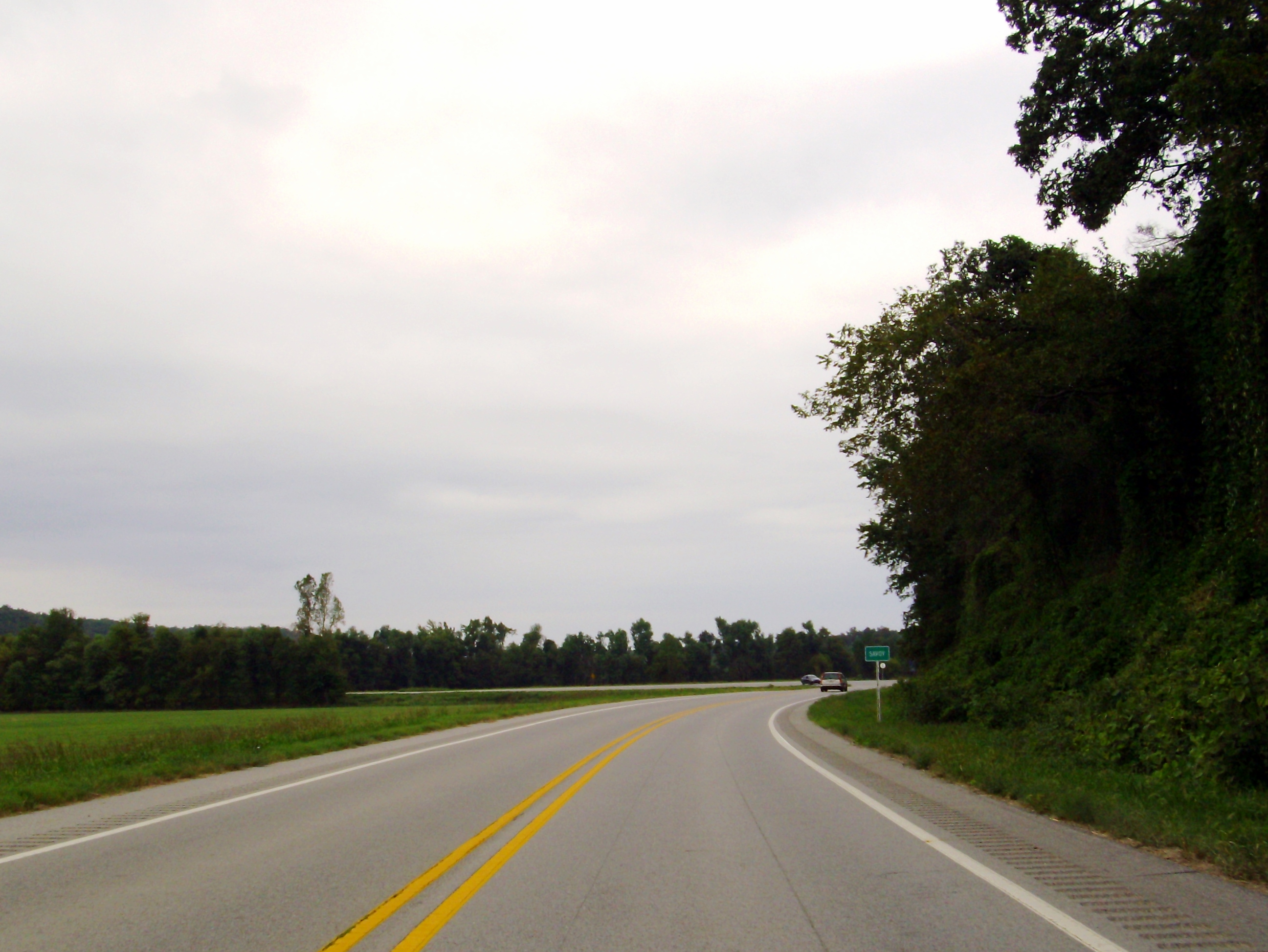
- Entering Savoy on Highway 16

- Savoy's position in Arkansas Savoy, Arkansas (the United States)
- Coordinates: 36°6′20″N 94°19′58″W
- Country: United States
- State: Arkansas
- County: Washington
- Township: Litteral
- Elevation: 1,040 ft (317 m)
- Time zone: UTC-6 (Central (CST))
  - Summer (DST): UTC-5 (CDT)
- ZIP code: 72704
- Area code: 479
- GNIS feature ID: 78300

Savoy (formerly Ladds Mill) is an unincorporated community in Litteral Township, Washington County, Arkansas, United States. It is located on County Route 845 east of Lake Wedington. The Ozark National Forest is just west of the community. The Savoy area is marked with bluffs and streams. A distinctive feature is the dam on Clear Creek where a flour mill was once in operation. Savoy had a post office and businesses that no longer exist.

Savoy is home to the Illinois River Bridge at Phillips Ford, a bridge spanning the Illinois River that is listed on the National Register of Historic Places.

The community is home to the University of Arkansas Animal Sciences’ Savoy Research Complex and the University of Arkansas Geology Department's Savoy Experimental Watershed.

The historic Savoy Community Building, the Howe-Savoy Bible Church and the Savoy Station of the Wedington Fire Department are located here.

The Shiloh Museum of Ozark History contains some information about the Savoy baseball team of 1917.
