= Illinois River Bridge at Phillips Ford =

- U.S. National Register of Historic Places
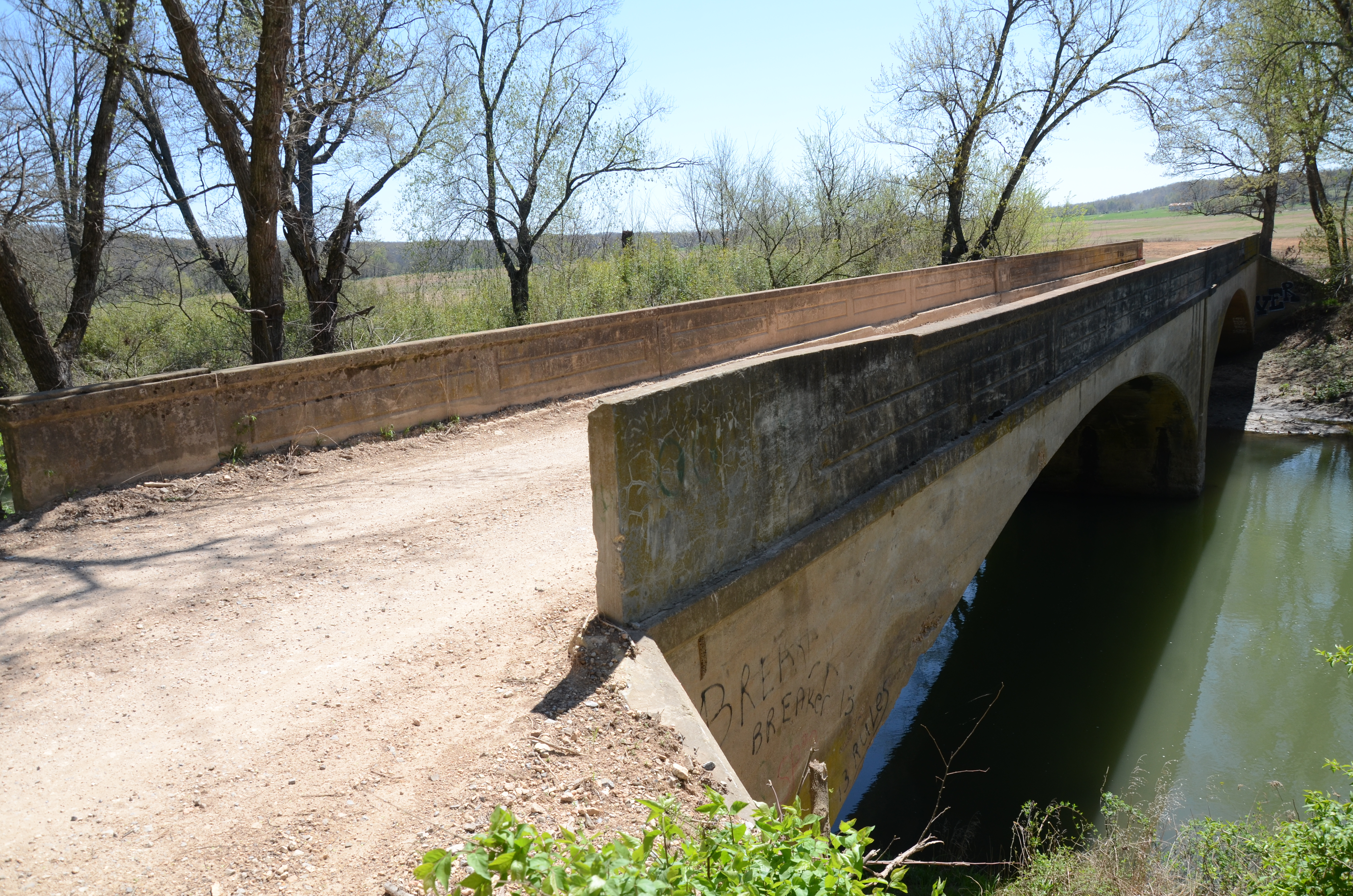

- Location within Arkansas Location within the United States
- Nearest city: Savoy, Arkansas
- Coordinates: 36°8′12″N 94°21′29″W
- Area: less than one acre
- Built: 1926
- Architect: Luten Bridge Co.
- Architectural style: Closed-spandrel arch
- MPS: Historic Bridges of Arkansas MPS
- NRHP reference No.: 08001344
- Added to NRHP: January 22, 2009

The Illinois River Bridge at Phillips Ford is a historic bridge in rural northern Washington County, Arkansas. It is a double-span closed-spandrel concrete arch bridge built in 1926 by the Luten Bridge Company, and it carries County Road 848 across the Illinois River in the Ozark National Forest south of U.S. Route 412 (US 412). The bridge's arches each span 81 feet (25 m), and the total structure length is 168 feet (51 m). The bridge uses Luten's patented method of reducing material in the bridge by the addition of metal rings to the spandrel walls.

The bridge was listed on the National Register of Historic Places in 2009.

== See also ==
- National Register of Historic Places listings in Washington County, Arkansas
- List of bridges on the National Register of Historic Places in Arkansas
