= Moores Creek Bridge =

Bridge in Florida, United States of America

- U.S. National Register of Historic Places
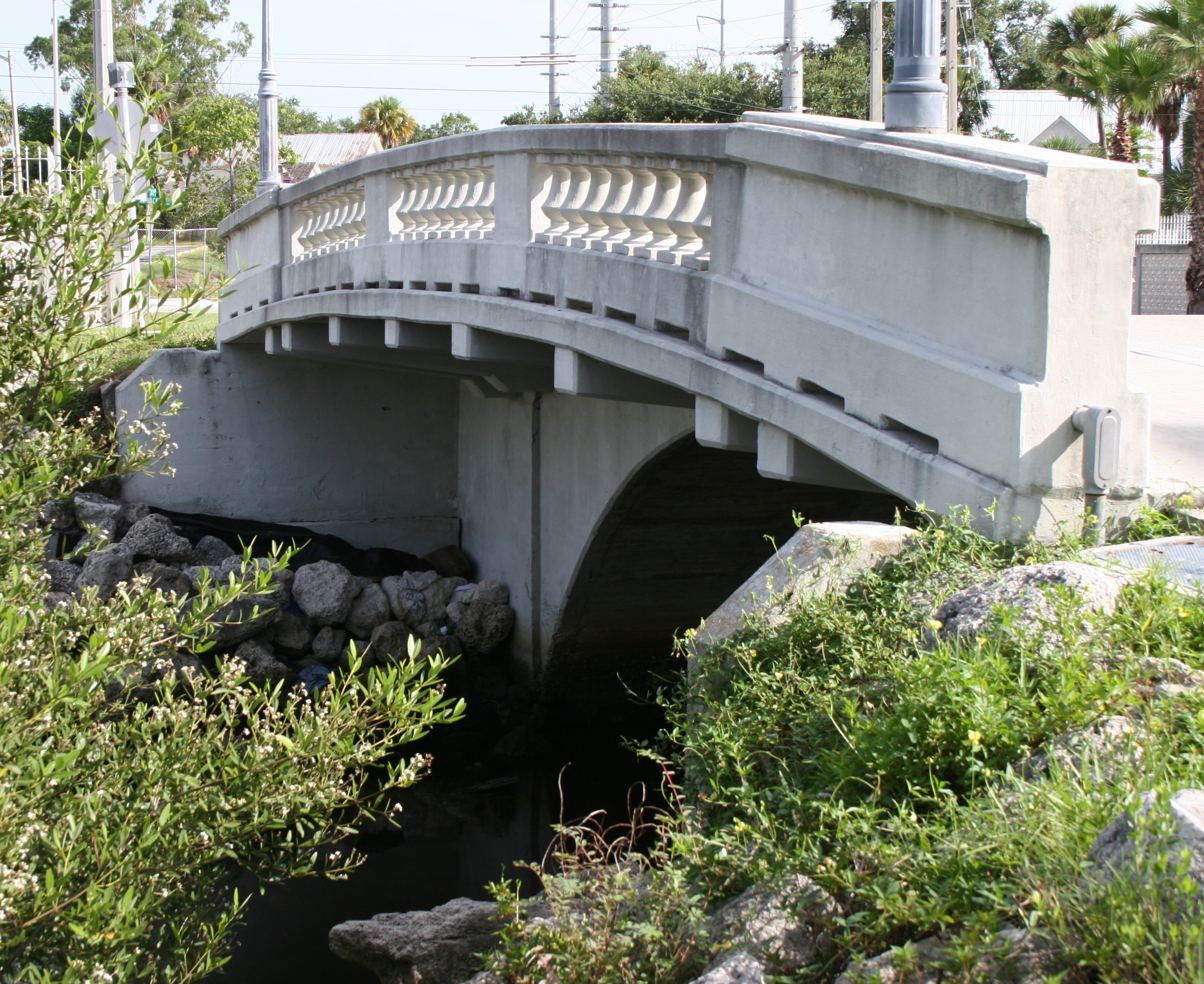

- Location within Florida Location within the United States
- Location: N. 2nd Street between Avenues B and C Fort Pierce, Florida 34950
- Coordinates: 27°27′2″N 80°19′32″W
- Built: 1925
- Built by: Luten Bridge Company
- Architectural style: Single-span arch-deck bridge
- NRHP reference No.: 01000890
- Added to NRHP: August 17, 2001

Moores Creek Bridge is an historic single span reinforced concrete bridge located on North 2nd Street between Avenues B and C in Fort Pierce, Florida. Including run up, it is 46 feet long. It is known locally as the Tickle Tummy Bridge or Tickle Tummy Hill because of its high arch relative to its short length. On August 17, 2001, it was added to the U.S. National Register of Historic Places.

== History ==
In 1925 Moores Creek Bridge was built by the Luten Bridge Company of Palatka, Florida to connect a residential section of Fort Pierce to the downtown and waterfront districts. It replaced a previous wooden bridge and is one of 15 concrete arch bridges dating from Florida's early 20th century land-boom era.

The bridge was retrofitted in 1997 by the joint efforts of Fort Pierce Main Street, the City of Fort Pierce and the Florida Department of Transportation. It reopened on December 7, 1997.
