= National Register of Historic Places listings in Lowndes County, Mississippi =

Location of Lowndes County in Mississippi

This is a list of the National Register of Historic Places listings in Lowndes County, Mississippi.

This is intended to be a complete list of the properties and districts on the National Register of Historic Places in Lowndes County, Mississippi, United States. Latitude and longitude coordinates are provided for many National Register properties and districts; these locations may be seen together in a map.

There are 34 properties and districts listed on the National Register in the county, including 1 National Historic Landmark. Another property was once listed but has been removed.

This National Park Service list is complete through NPS recent listings posted October 23, 2026.

== Current listings ==
	Name on the Register	Image	Date listed	Location	City or town	Description
1	Brownrigg-Harris-Kennebrew House	Brownrigg-Harris-Kennebrew House	May 22, 1978 (#78001614)	515 9th St. N. 33°30′07″N 88°25′24″W	Columbus	
2	Butler Mound and Village Site	Butler Mound and Village Site	December 8, 1978 (#78001615)	Address restricted	Columbus	
3	The Cedars	The Cedars	March 29, 1979 (#79001328)	1311 Military Rd. 33°30′36″N 88°25′09″W	Columbus	
4	Columbus Bridge	Columbus Bridge	November 16, 1988 (#88002396)	Spans the Tombigbee River on Old U.S. Route 82; 33°29′37″N 88°26′03″W	Columbus	
5	Columbus Central Commercial Historic District		April 23, 1980 (#80002284)	U.S. Routes 45 and 82; 33°29′47″N 88°25′39″W	Columbus	
6	Cox-Uithoven House	Cox-Uithoven House	May 8, 1980 (#80002285)	North of Columbus on Old Aberdeen Rd. 33°36′03″N 88°27′28″W	Columbus	
7	William E. Ervin House		December 1, 1989 (#89002053)	Armstrong Rd./Route 4, southeast of Columbus; 33°28′33″N 88°20′40″W	Columbus	
8	Factory Hill-Frog Bottom-Burns Bottom Historic District		September 2, 1980 (#80002286)	Roughly bounded by 2nd and 6th Aves. and 2nd and 5th Sts. 33°29′52″N 88°25′51″W	Columbus	
9	Friendship Cemetery	Friendship Cemetery	July 23, 1980 (#80002287)	1300 4th St. 33°28′51″N 88°25′50″W	Columbus	
10	Kenneth Gatchell House	Kenneth Gatchell House	March 21, 1978 (#78001616)	1411 College St. 33°29′45″N 88°25′00″W	Columbus	
11	Harris-Banks House	Harris-Banks House	November 16, 1978 (#78001617)	122 7th Ave., S. 33°29′17″N 88°25′52″W	Columbus	
12	Hickory Sticks	Hickory Sticks	April 29, 1977 (#77000792)	1206 N. 7th St. 33°30′32″N 88°25′31″W	Columbus	
13	James Creek No. 1 Site	James Creek No. 1 Site	May 23, 1978 (#78001618)	Address restricted	Columbus	
14	Jones-Banks-Leigh House	Jones-Banks-Leigh House	October 31, 1985 (#85003445)	824 8th St., N. 33°30′12″N 88°25′35″W	Columbus	
15	S.D. Lee High School	S.D. Lee High School	March 25, 2019 (#100003552)	1815 Military Rd. 33°30′56″N 88°25′02″W	Columbus	
16	S.D. Lee House	S.D. Lee House	May 6, 1971 (#71000456)	314 N. 7th St. 33°29′54″N 88°25′32″W	Columbus	
17	Lindamood Building of Palmer Home for Children	Lindamood Building of Palmer Home for Children	June 24, 1993 (#93000574)	912 11th Ave., S. 33°29′04″N 88°25′17″W	Columbus	
18	MacKay Mound	MacKay Mound	August 25, 1978 (#78001619)	Address restricted	Columbus	
19	Charles McLaran House	Charles McLaran House	December 12, 1976 (#76001102)	514 2nd St., S. 33°29′24″N 88°25′54″W	Columbus	
20	Motley Slough Bridge	Motley Slough Bridge	November 16, 1988 (#88002405)	Spans Motley Slough on Shaeffer's Chapel Rd. 33°26′21″N 88°31′08″W	Columbus	
21	Mt. Pleasant Methodist Church	Mt. Pleasant Methodist Church	July 5, 2007 (#07000649)	2382 Wright Rd. 33°36′31″N 88°20′11″W	Caledonia	
22	Old Fort House	Old Fort House	October 31, 1985 (#85003444)	510 7th St., N. 33°30′00″N 88°25′34″W	Columbus	
23	Old St. Paul's Episcopal Church Rectory	Old St. Paul's Episcopal Church Rectory	July 12, 1996 (#96000702)	300 Main St. 33°29′40″N 88°25′49″W	Columbus	
24	Owen-Richardson-Owen House		March 7, 2007 (#07000122)	1709 9th St., S. 33°28′37″N 88°25′20″W	Columbus	
25	Plymouth	Plymouth	April 22, 1980 (#80002288)	Address restricted	Columbus	
26	Rosedale	Rosedale	June 24, 1994 (#94000642)	1523 9th St., S. 33°28′49″N 88°25′15″W	Columbus	
27	Sims-Brown House	Sims-Brown House	October 30, 1997 (#97001297)	324 9th St., N. 33°29′56″N 88°25′25″W	Columbus	
28	Snowdoun	Snowdoun	October 19, 1978 (#78001620)	906 3rd Ave., N. 33°29′54″N 88°25′23″W	Columbus	
29	South Columbus Historic District	South Columbus Historic District	June 8, 1982 (#82003104)	U.S. Route 82; also 1124 Main St.; also roughly bounded by Main and College Sts., 3rd and 4th Aves. South, 9th' 15th, South 7th and 1st Sts., Tombigbee R. 33°28′27″N 88°25′18″W	Columbus	Second and third address groups represent boundary changes approved July 27, 2005 and September 29, 2021.
30	Sykes-Leigh House		March 14, 1985 (#85000555)	719-7th St., N. 33°30′08″N 88°25′40″W	Columbus	
31	Symons House	Symons House	March 28, 1979 (#79001329)	304 4th Ave., S. 33°29′30″N 88°25′47″W	Columbus	
32	U.S. Post Office	U.S. Post Office	April 21, 1983 (#83000958)	524 Main St. 33°29′42″N 88°25′37″W	Columbus	
33	Waverly Bridge	Waverly Bridge	March 20, 1989 (#88002412)	Spans the Tombigbee River on the Columbus and Greenville Railway; 33°33′54″N 88°29′48″W	Columbus	Extends into Clay County
34	Weaver Place	Weaver Place	November 16, 1978 (#78001621)	216 3rd Ave., S. 33°29′33″N 88°25′46″W	Columbus	

== Former listing ==
	Name on the Register	Image	Date listed	Date removed	Location	City or town	Description
1	Bethel Presbyterian Church		December 19, 1986 (#86003126)	June 23, 2003	12 mi. off US 45	Columbus vicinity	Destroyed by an F3 tornado during the 2002 Veterans Day Weekend tornado outbreak November 10, 2002

== See also ==
- List of National Historic Landmarks in Mississippi
- National Register of Historic Places listings in Mississippi
