= List of bridges on the National Register of Historic Places in Wisconsin =

This is a list of bridges and tunnels on the National Register of Historic Places in the U.S. state of Wisconsin.

Name	Image	Built	Listed	Location	County	Type
Armstrong Creek Bridge		1908	2011-11-18	Armstrong Creek; 45°38′29″N 88°26′47″W	Forest	
Barteau Bridge	Barteau Bridge	1906	2002-03-28	Bovina; 44°27′56″N 88°34′0″W	Outagamie	Stone arch Bridge
Bridge No. 1	Bridge No. 1	1892, 1902	1980-02-27	La Crosse; 44°1′15″N 91°18′28″W	La Crosse	Bowstring Arch Truss Bridge
Bridge No. 2	Bridge No. 2	1892, 1902	1980-02-27	La Crosse; 44°1′16″N 91°18′38″W	La Crosse	Bowstring Arch Truss Bridge
Bridge No. 3	Bridge No. 3	1892	1980-02-27	La Crosse; 44°1′17″N 91°18′51″W	La Crosse	Bowstring Arch Truss Bridge
Bridge No. 4	Bridge No. 4	1892, 1902	1980-02-27	La Crosse; 44°1′24″N 91°19′14″W	La Crosse	Bowstring Arch Truss Bridge
Bridge No. 5	Bridge No. 5	1892, 1902	1980-02-27	La Crosse; 44°1′24″N 91°19′44″W	La Crosse	King post Bridge
Bridge No. 6	Bridge No. 6	1892, 1902	1980-02-27	La Crosse; 44°1′27″N 91°20′8″W	La Crosse	Bowstring Arch Truss Bridge
Covered Bridge		1876	1973-03-14	Cedarburg (town); 43°20′16″N 88°0′16″W	Ozaukee	latticed timber truss
Cunningham Lane Bridge		1895	1996-07-05	Rockbridge; 43°23′40″N 90°24′45″W	Richland	Pratt full-slope pony truss
First Street Bridge	First Street Bridge	1904	1996-09-12	Merrill; 45°10′44″N 89°42′12″W	Lincoln	stone-arch
Green Bay Road Bridge	Green Bay Road Bridge	1887	1998-08-03	Manitowoc Rapids; 44°5′46″N 87°42′6″W	Manitowoc	Pratt through truss
Manchester Street Bridge	Manchester Street Bridge	1884, 1987	1988-10-13	Baraboo; 43°28′13″N 89°45′21″W	Sauk	Camelback through truss
Marsh Rainbow Arch Bridge	Marsh Rainbow Arch Bridge	1916	1982-06-25	Chippewa Falls; 44°56′11″N 91°23′26″W	Chippewa	
Smyth Road Bridge		1928	1996-09-12	Lakewood; 45°18′54″N 88°24′54″W	Oconto	overhead pratt truss
Soo Line High Bridge		1910, 1911	1977-08-22	Somerset	St. Croix	Five Arch Span
Sprague Bridge	Sprague Bridge	1913	1995-01-23	Finley; 44°11′11″N 90°6′15″W	Juneau	Pratt half-hip pony truss
Stillwater Bridge		1931	1989-05-25	Houlton; 45°3′27″N 92°48′0″W	St. Croix	Vertical lift bridge
Sturgeon Bay Bridge	Sturgeon Bay Bridge	1931	2008-01-17	Sturgeon Bay; 44°49′55″N 87°22′52″W	Door	Truss bridge with bascule drawspan
Tayco Street Bridge		1928, 1929	1986-05-30	Menasha; 44°11′54″N 88°27′9″W	Winnebago	Strauss Trunion Bascule
Third Street Bridge		1899	1988-09-21	Menomonee Falls; 43°10′55″N 88°6′52″W	Waukesha	Stone Arch Bridge
Turtleville Iron Bridge	Turtleville Iron Bridge	1887	1977-09-15	Beloit; 42°33′56″N 88°57′52″W	Rock	Pratt Truss Design
Upper Twin Falls Bridge		1910	2012-12-12	Florence; 45°52′39″N 88°04′43″W	Florence	
Wakely Road Bridge		1892	2001-04-05	Saratoga; 44°18′0″N 89°53′19″W	Wood	stone arch bridge
Grand Avenue Bridge	Grand Avenue Bridge	1894	removed 1987-02-18	Neillsville	Clark	Overhead Pratt Truss
Leedle Mill Truss Bridge	Leedle Mill Truss Bridge	ca. 1916	1980-09-17 removed 2013-1-9	Evansville; 42°50′37″N 89°15′8″W	Rock	Pratt Truss
Second Street Bridge			removed 1987-05-18	Galesville	Trempealeau	
Sock Road Bridge	Sock Road Bridge	1893	removed 1982-03-04	Lowell	Dodge	Pinned Pratt truss
