= Wisconsin Bridge and Iron Company =

American bridge fabricator

The Wisconsin Bridge and Iron Company (WB&I) was a fabricator and erector of iron and steel bridges and other large structures.

According to one source it was founded in Milwaukee, Wisconsin in 1888. According to another source, the firm was founded by three brothers in Wauwatosa, Wisconsin in 1870 as Weinhagen Brothers, Engineers, which in 1880 became known as the Wisconsin Bridge and Iron Company, and was incorporated in 1891 using that name. The 1887 Turtleville bridge was believed to be one of the earlier truss bridges constructed by the firm.

The Riemer family of Elm Grove, Wisconsin was heavily affiliated with the company until it was sold in the 1970s. A competitor to American Bridge Company, (in at least one case both firms submitted bids that matched to the penny), this firm was responsible for many bridges and other large structures in the United States Midwest and elsewhere. The Historic American Engineering Record shows at least 16 projects where WB&I were believed to be either the prime, steel or fabrication contractors.

A number of the firm's works are listed on the U.S. National Register of Historic Places (NRHP).

== Selected works ==
Not meant as an exhaustive list, here are a few projects that WB&I is known to have participated in:

- Heath M. Robinson Memorial Cut River Bridge - US-2, Michigan - 1947
- Green Bay Road Bridge - Manitowoc Rapids, Wisconsin - 1887
- Turtleville Iron Bridge (1887), near Beloit, Wisconsin, a Pratt truss bridge, NRHP-listed
- Ashfork-Bainbridge Steel Dam- Arizona - 1898
- Redridge Steel Dam - Michigan - 1901
- Hauser Dam - 1907
- Brownsville & Matamoros International Bridge - Texas - 1908
- MacArthur Bridge - Iowa/Illinois - 1917
- Ironton-Russell Bridge - Ironton, Ohio - 1922
- U.S. Rt. 90 Pearl River Bridge - Mississippi / Louisiana - 1933
- Jefferson Street Viaduct (1936), over Des Moines River, Ottumwa, Iowa, NRHP-listed
- Hutsonville Bridge - Indiana - 1939
- Aloha Stadium - Hawaii
- Lincoln Center movable stage.
- Shirley Railroad Bridge - Arkansas - 1908, NRHP-listed as Middle Fork of the Little Red River Bridge, Co. Rd. 125 over the Middle Fork of the Little Red River Shirley, Arkansas
- Seventh Street-Black River Bridge, Seventh St. over Black R. Port Huron, Michigan, NRHP-listed
- St. Francis River Bridge, US 70, over the St. Francis River Madison, Arkansas, NRHP-listed
- Waverly Bridge, spans Tombigbee River between Waverly & Columbus, Mississippi, NRHP-listed
- Wasena Bridge, spans the Roanoke River in the Wasena Historic District of Roanoke, Virginia - 1939
- Woodford Bridge, spans the Milwaukee River in Young America (West Bend) WI - 1891
