= South Columbus =

South Columbus may refer to:

- South Columbus, Ohio
- South Columbus, Georgia
- South Columbus Historic District, Columbus, Mississippi
- South Columbus High School, Tabor City, North Carolina
