= Columbus Historic District =

Columbus Historic District may refer to:

in the United States

(by state)

- Columbus Historic District (Columbus, Georgia), listed on the NRHP in Georgia
- Columbus Historic Riverfront Industrial District, Columbus, Georgia, listed on the NRHP in Georgia
- Columbus Historic District (Columbus, Indiana), listed on the NRHP in Indiana
- South Columbus Historic District, Columbus, Mississippi, listed on the NRHP in Mississippi
- Columbus Downtown Historic District, Columbus, Wisconsin, listed on the NRHP in Wisconsin
