= St. Francis River Bridge =

St. Francis River Bridge may refer to:

- St. Francis River Bridge (Lake City, Arkansas), listed on the National Register of Historic Places (NRHP) in Arkansas
- St. Francis River Bridge (Madison, Arkansas), listed on the NRHP in Arkansas
