= Isaac Craite =

American politician

Isaac Craite (April 1856 – February 23, 1918) was a Wisconsin businessman, judge, and legislator.

Born in Manitowoc Rapids, Wisconsin, Craite taught school and became a justice of the peace. Craite became a merchant and was elected to the municipal court in Manitowoc, Wisconsin. During this time, he studied the law, was admitted to the state bar and practiced law. In 1887 and 1889, Craite was elected to the Wisconsin State Assembly.
