= Hickory Sticks =

Historic house in Mississippi

- U.S. National Register of Historic Places
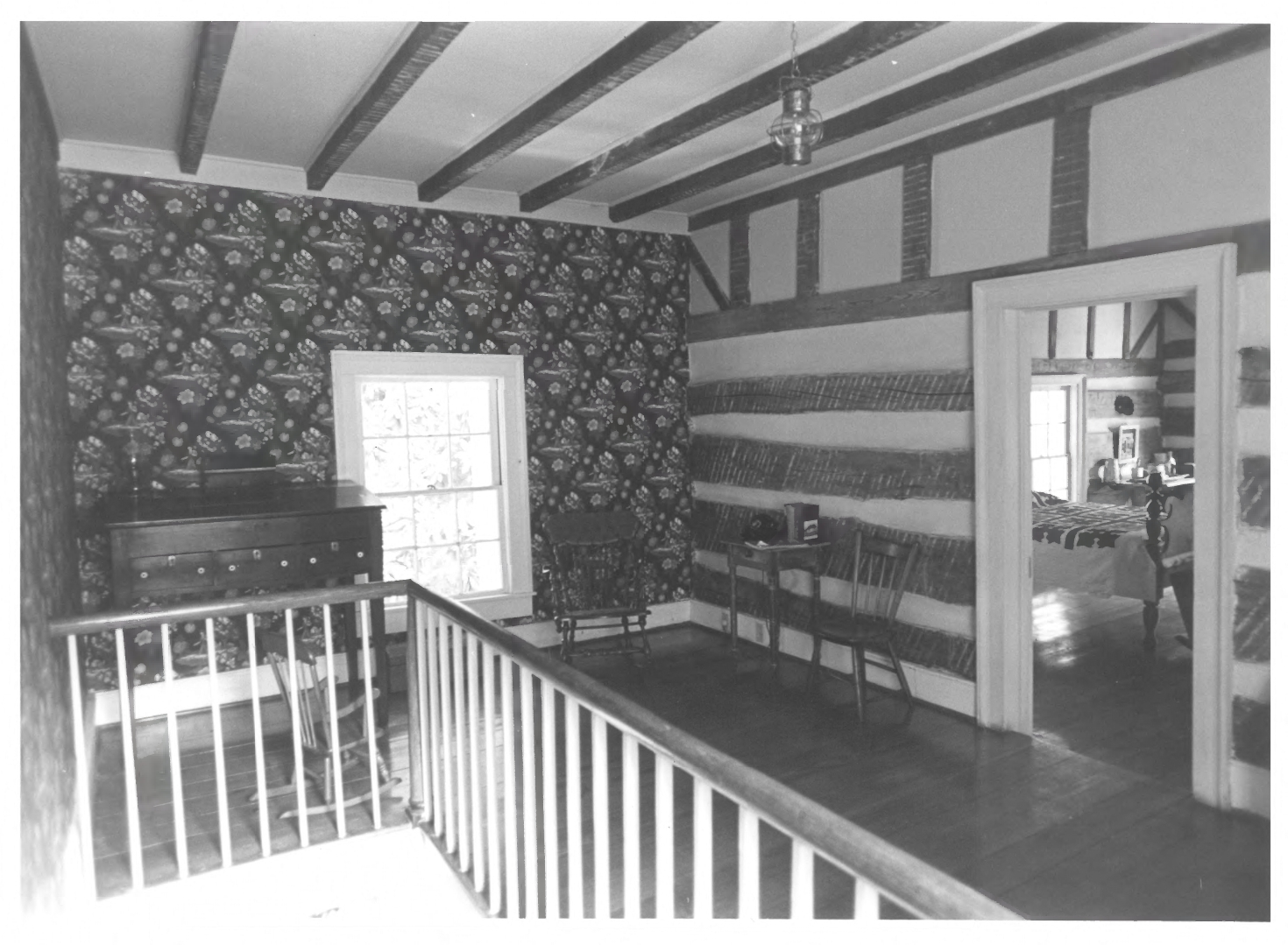

- Location within Mississippi Location within the United States
- Location: 1206 N. 7th St., Columbus, Mississippi
- Coordinates: 33°30′32″N 88°25′31″W
- Area: 3.5 acres (1.4 ha)
- Built: c. 1817–c. 1830 (log house); expanded c. 1846
- Architectural style: Greek Revival (vernacular)
- NRHP reference No.: 77000792
- Added to NRHP: April 29, 1977

Hickory Sticks, also known as the Weir–Haden House, is a historic log-and-frame residence at 1206 North Seventh Street in Columbus, Mississippi. It was listed on the National Register of Historic Places on April 29, 1977.

== History ==
The oldest portion of the house began as a double-pen log structure dating to the early settlement period in Columbus (c. 1817–c. 1830).

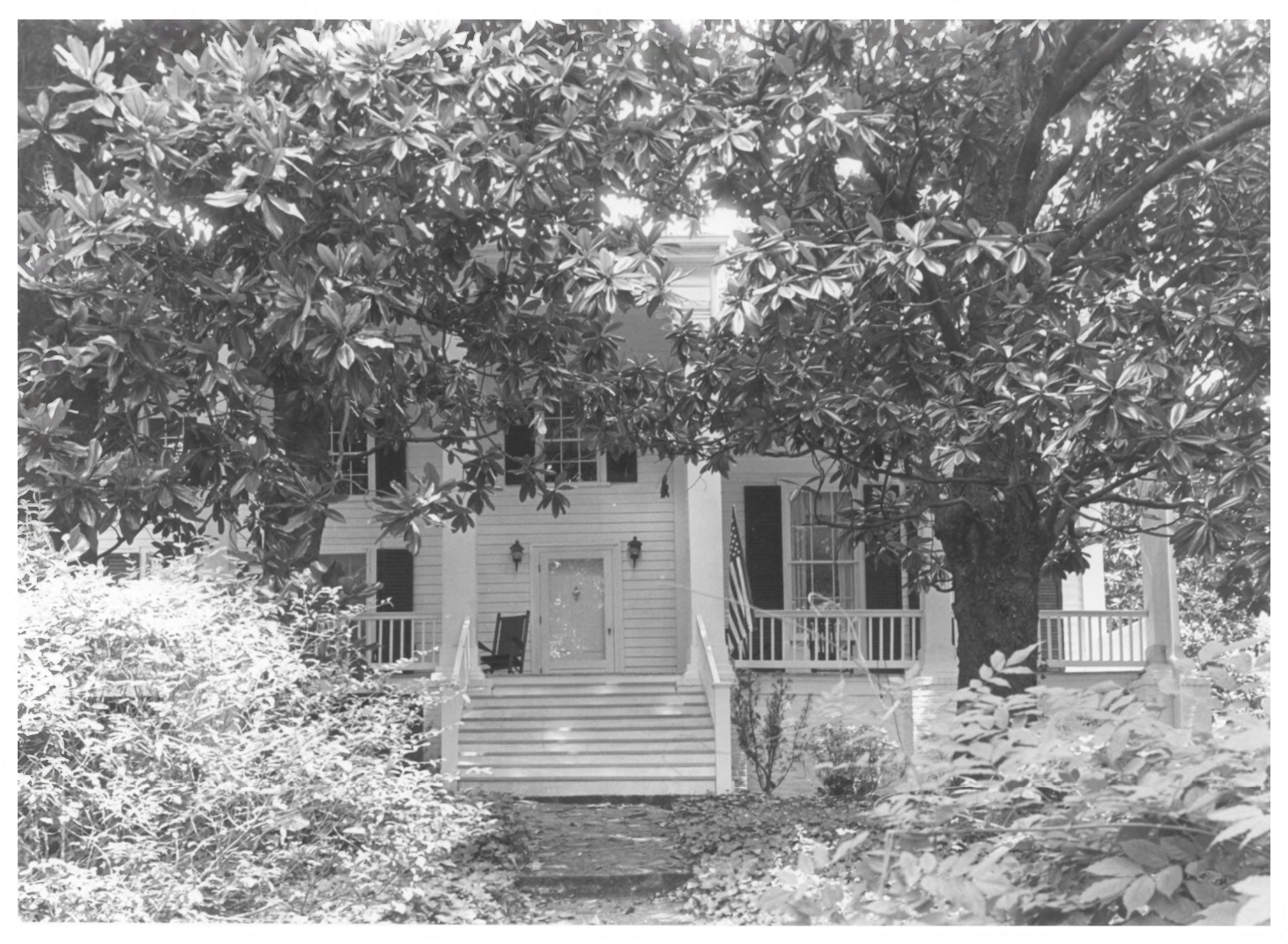
Photo from 1976

According to the nomination, the property formed part of a 160-acre tract associated with Dr. Andrew Weir, who obtained patents to the land in 1834 and 1835. In 1846, Robert D. Haden purchased a reduced segment of the tract and expanded and remodeled the house, giving it a Greek Revival appearance that included a front gallery and a revised interior plan.

In 1879, Confederate officer and educator Stephen D. Lee purchased the property; it later passed to his son, Blewitt Lee. Blewitt Lee deeded 11 acres to the city of Columbus for a public park now known as Lee Park, while the house site and remaining acreage were sold separately and further subdivided over time.

In 1949, the house was purchased and renovated by Mr. and Mrs. Robert A. Ivy, who added central heating and air conditioning and constructed a rear wing; the deteriorated east pen of the original log structure was removed during the project.

The home was scheduled to be auctioned in 2022.

== Gallery ==
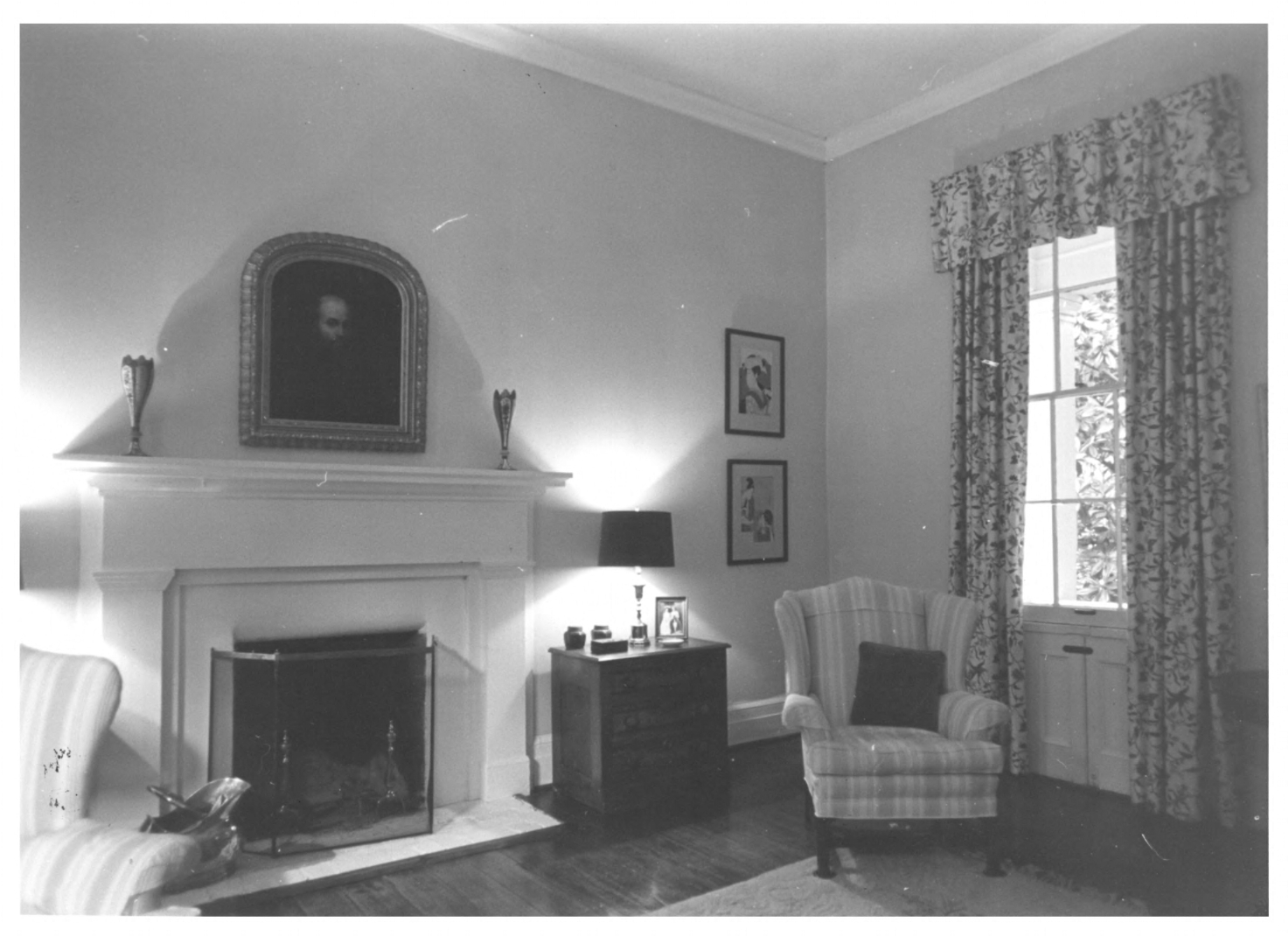

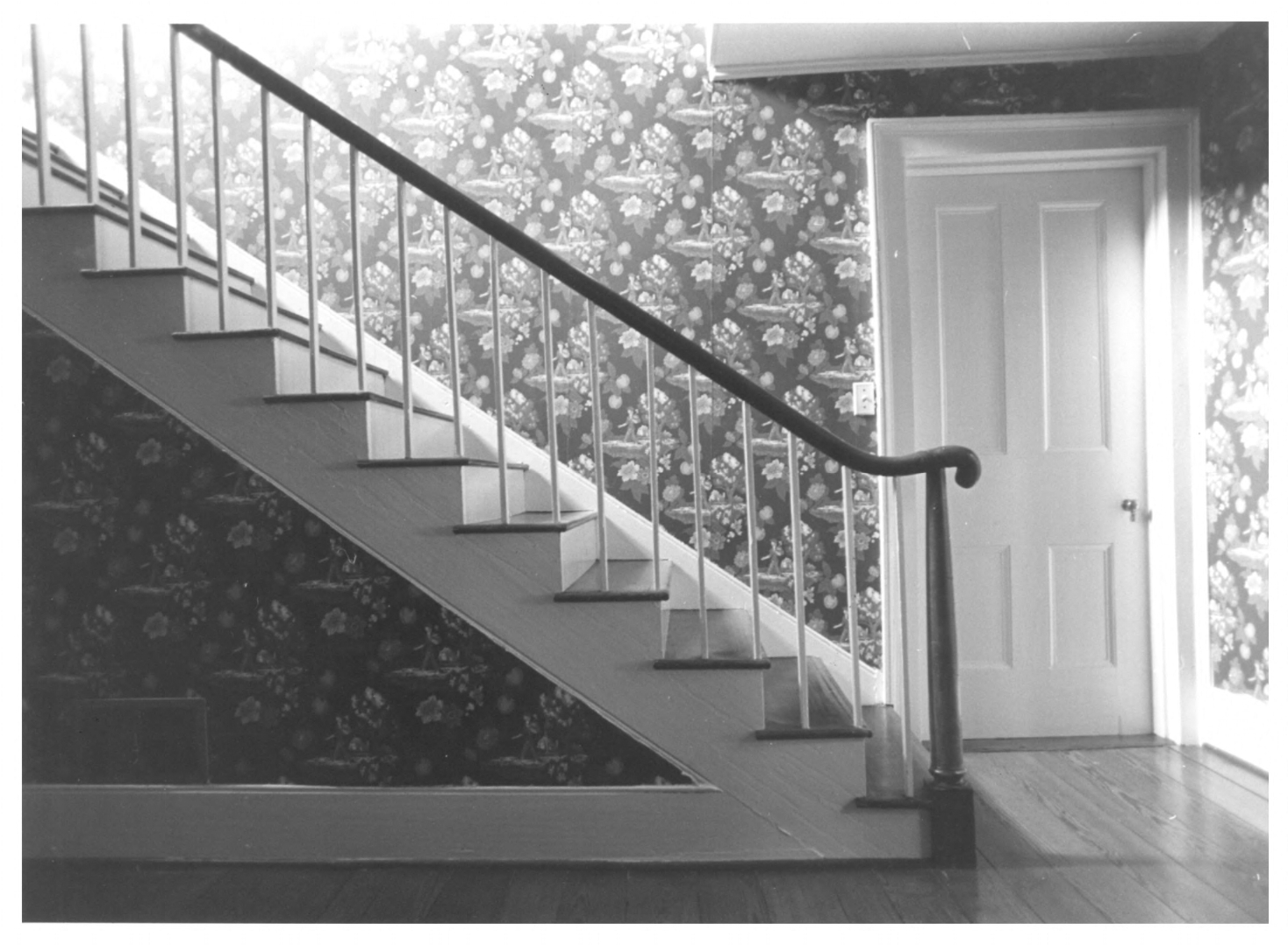

== See also ==
- National Register of Historic Places listings in Lowndes County, Mississippi
