= South Columbus Historic District =

Historic district in Mississippi, United States

- U.S. National Register of Historic Places
- U.S. Historic district
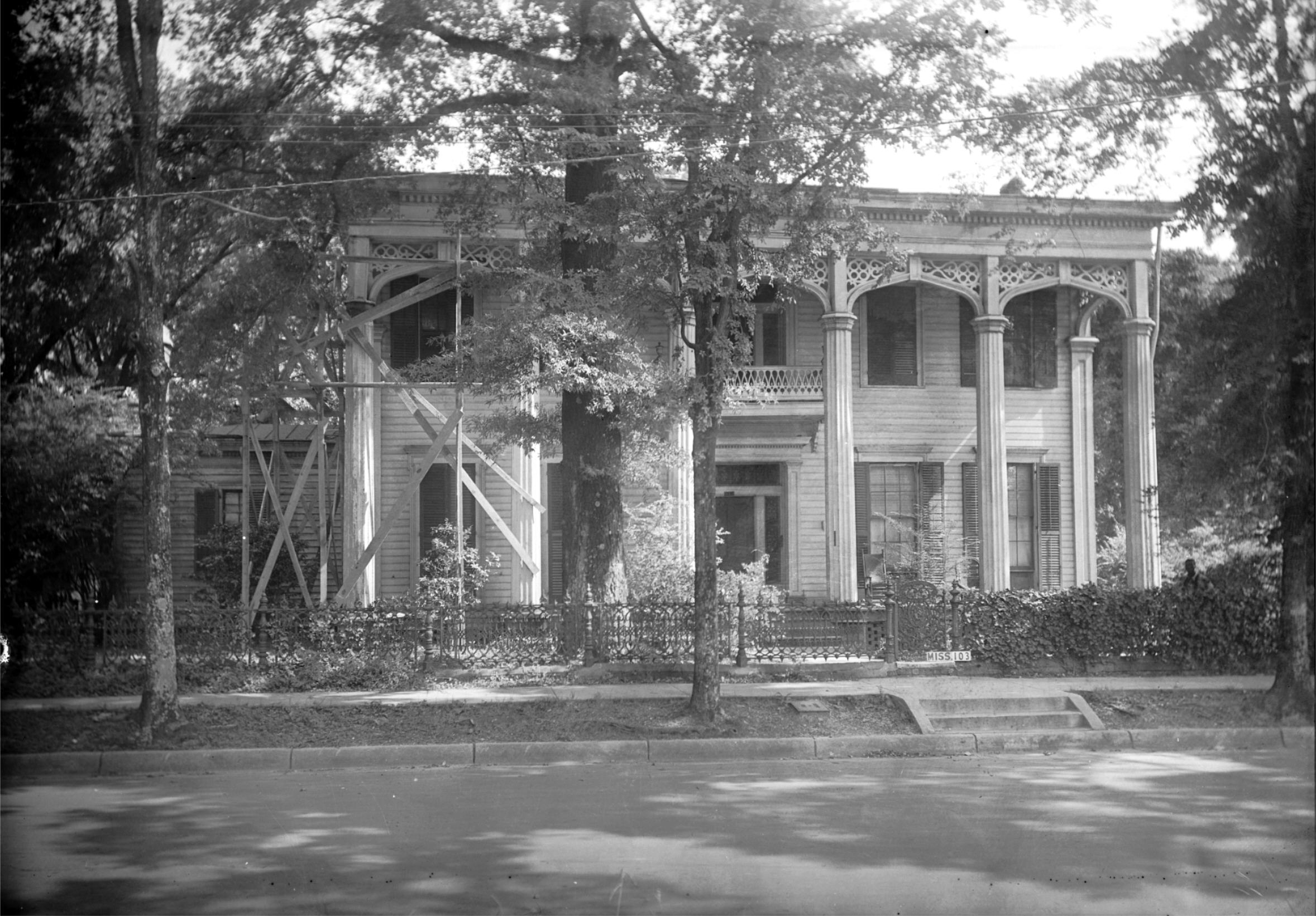
- Errolton

- Location within Mississippi Location within the United States
- Location: U.S. 82 (original) and 1124 Main St. (increase), Columbus, Mississippi
- Coordinates: 33°28′27″N 88°25′18″W
- Built: 1880
- Architectural style: Mid 19th Century Revival, Late 19th and Early 20th Century American Movements, Late Victorian (original) and Late Victorian, L-Front Cottage (increase)
- NRHP reference No.: 82003104 (original); 05000741 (increase 1); 100007035 (increase 2)

Significant dates
- Added to NRHP: June 08, 1982
- Boundary increases: July 27, 2005; September 29, 2021

South Columbus Historic District is a historic district in Columbus, Mississippi that was listed on the National Register of Historic Places in 1982. Its 1980 nomination lists 525 structures and sites.

According to the nomination:

The South Columbus Historic District is a cohesive, well-preserved neighborhood of archi- tecturally [sic] and historically significant buildings which visually illustrate the city's historical pattern of development since the early 1800s. It contains one of the greatest concentrations of nineteenth century residential structures in the state and exhibits a virtually complete record of American building styles from the 1820s throught [sic] the 1930s. Additionally, the district possesses significant examples of adaptions and combinations of architectural designs which are unique to Columbus; it contains the homes of several persons who played important roles in local, state, and national history; and it includes the site of Columbus' oldest industry, Columbus Marble Works (est. 1846).

The district was increased in 2005 to add a c. 1900 Late Victorian L-shaped house at 1124 Main St., so that its renovation could benefit from a tax incentive.

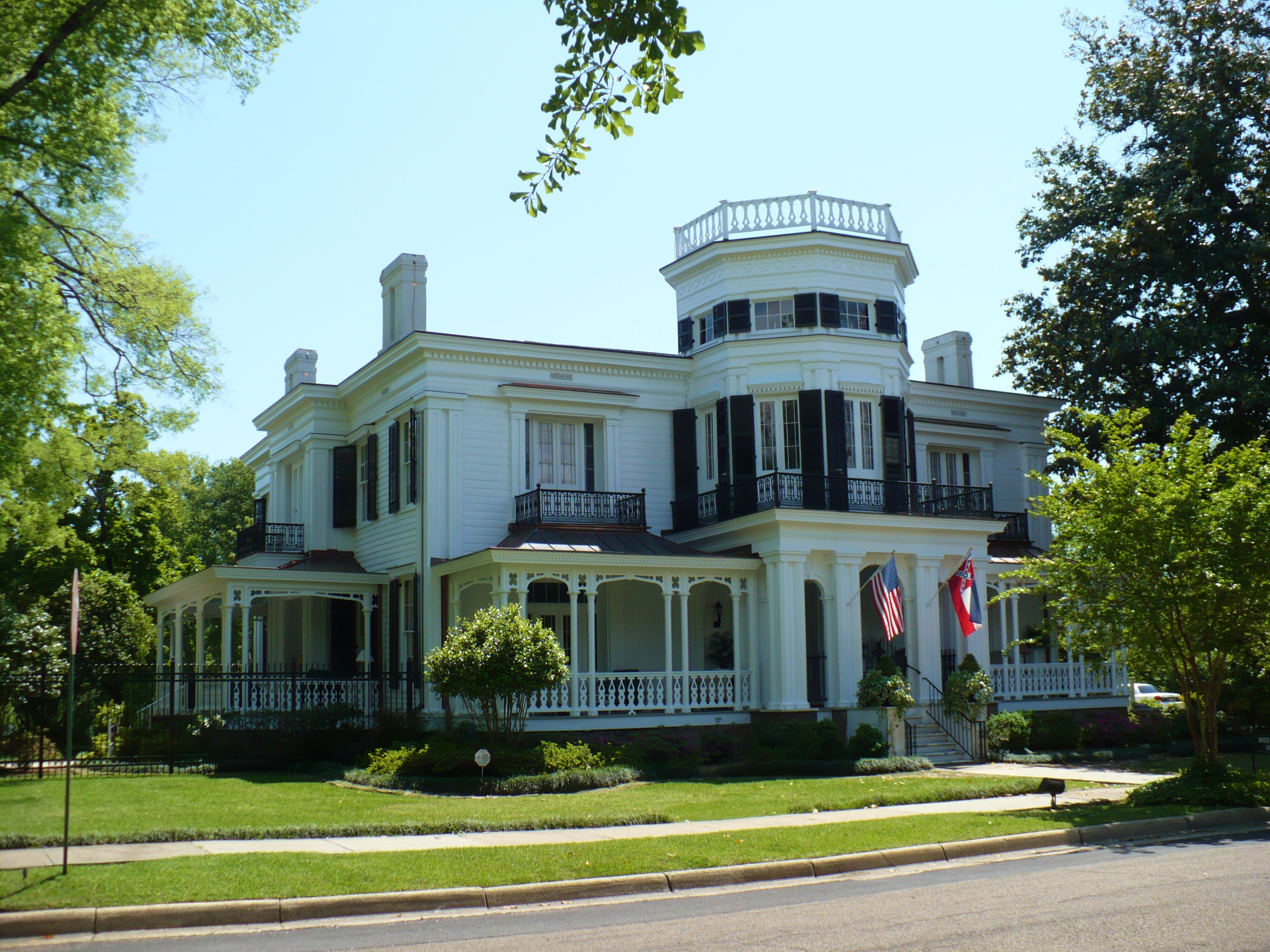
White Arches

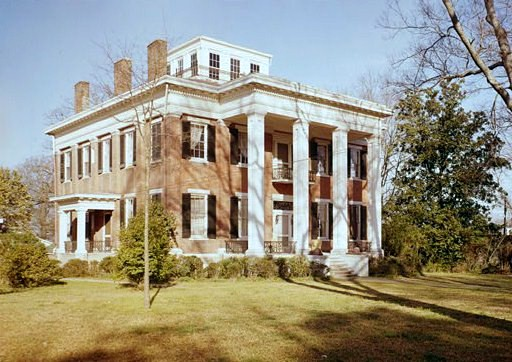
Riverview in 1975

Properties in the district that are separately listed on the National Register include:

- Errolton (1854), also known as Weaver Place, at 216 3rd Avenue South.
- Kenneth Gatchell House (c. 1851–59), 1411 2nd Avenue South. Greek Revival, with "giant order pedimented portico with square paneled columns, portico ascended by double flight of steps, second story balcony."
- White Arches (c. 1857), also known as Harris-Banks House, 122 7th Avenue South. Italianate.
- Corner Cottage (c. 1835), also known as Symons House, 304 4th Avenue South, a two-story house with a one-story full-width veranda
- Riverview (Columbus, Mississippi) (1847–51), also known as Charles McLaran House, 514 2nd Street South. Greek Revival. Two-and-a-half-story brick house with identical front and rear porticos with paneled square columns.
