= Upper Twin Falls Bridge =

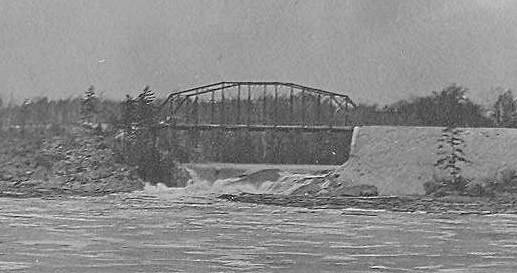
- Upper Twin Falls Bridge in 1911
- Coordinates: 45.8775°N 88.0785°W
- Crosses: Menominee River
- Locale: Michigan–Wisconsin border

History
- Designer: M. W. Torkelson
- Constructed by: Central States Bridge Company
- Construction cost: $5,106
- Upper Twin Falls Bridge
- U.S. National Register of Historic Places
- Location within Michigan
- Built: 1909–1910
- NRHP reference No.: 12001028
- Added to NRHP: December 12, 2012

Location
- Interactive map of Upper Twin Falls Bridge

The Upper Twin Falls Bridge is a bridge that spans the Menominee River linking Breitung Township, Michigan, to Florence County, Wisconsin. Completed in 1910, construction was prompted by the erection of a dam downstream. The bridge was closed to automobile traffic in 1971. It was listed on the National Register of Historic Places in December 2012.

== Design and location ==
The Upper Twin Falls Bridge is a single-span, pin-connected, camelback, through-truss bridge. It crosses the Menominee River about four miles (6.4 km) north of Iron Mountain, Michigan. The bridge is the only known example of its type in Michigan and one of two in Wisconsin, however the other is not in its original location.

== History ==
=== Construction ===
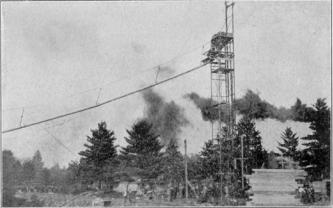
The Twin Falls Power Dam, seen here under construction, prompted the construction of the Upper Twin Falls Bridge.

In the early 1900s, the Peninsula Power Company planned to build the Twin Falls Power Dam on the Menominee River. Upstream was an existing bridge which would be flooded by construction of the dam and the filling of its reservoir. This prompted the construction of a new bridge.

The Upper Twin Falls Bridge was designed by M. W. Torkelson of Wisconsin. Construction of the bridge took place from 1909 through 1910 and cost $5,106, paid for equally by Dickinson and Florence counties. Gilbert Vilas Carpenter supervised construction. The bridge's earthen approach causeways were built for $7,500, paid by the Twin Falls Land Association. Material for the Wisconsin approach was obtained from a borrow pit on the Wisconsin side and transported to the site by side-dumping flatcars on narrow gauge railway. The dam was completed in 1912.

=== 1920s to present ===
Gilbert Carpenter died in World War I following a torpedo attack en route from Cuba. In his honor, the Carpenter Monument was erected at the north end of the bridge and dedicated on Memorial Day, 1923. The memorial was partially funded by the Dickinson County Road Commission (DCRC) and its inscribed bronze plaque was provided by the Michigan State Highway Department.

In the early 1930s, the Upper Twin Falls bridge carried US Highway 2 (US 2) and US Highway 141 (US 141). In 1934, a new bridge was built about a mile downstream and US 2 and US 141 were rerouted over the new span. The Upper Twin Falls Bridge closed to automobile traffic in September 1971. Ownership of the bridge and connecting roads was transferred to the DCRC and the Town of Florence. Robert Christensen, Michigan's coordinator for the National Register of Historic Places, opined in early 2013 that the bridge survived only because it had been bypassed by the other bridge.

Around 2000, the county road commission began considering the removal or restoration of the bridge. However, the commission could not afford removal. One argument in favor of removal came from pontoon boat owners as the vessels are unable to pass underneath the bridge.

The nomination process for inclusion on the National Register of Historic Places began in 2012. The nomination was reviewed by the Michigan Historic Preservation Review Board in May 2012 and by the Wisconsin Historic Preservation Review Board in August. Both groups supported the nomination, with unanimous support from the Wisconsin board. The nomination made use of a previous draft nomination produced by the Wisconsin Historical Society. After their approvals, Robert Christensen forwarded the nomination to the National Park Service in Washington, DC. The bridge was added to the National Register of Historic Places on December 12, 2012. It is the first site nominated by both Michigan and Wisconsin. As a result of the listing, it is hoped by local groups that funding for restoration may become available.

According to Jim Harris, the DCRC superintendent of operations, there is no expectation of ever reopening the bridge to automobile traffic.

== See also ==
- List of bridges on the National Register of Historic Places in Michigan
- List of bridges on the National Register of Historic Places in Wisconsin
- National Register of Historic Places listings in Dickinson County, Michigan
- National Register of Historic Places listings in Florence County, Wisconsin
