= S.D. Lee High School =

Former school in Mississippi

Coordinates: 33.5146°N 88.4179°W

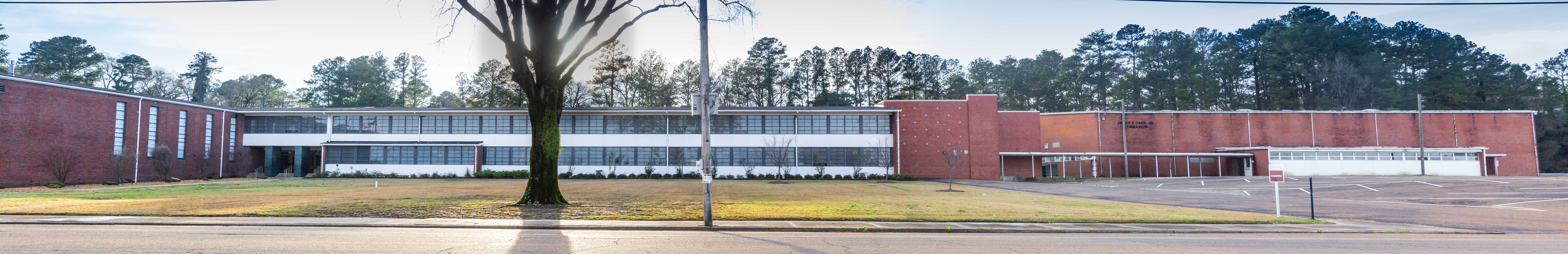
Front

S.D. Lee High School was a high school in Columbus, Mississippi. It served white students prior to integration. It is listed on the National Register of Historic Places and is a Mississippi Landmark. After consolidation it became Lee Middle School. In 2010 a new middle school was being built. The school is on Military Road and Generals were its mascot. The school is at 1815 Military Road. It is a modernist / international architecture building.

The Florence McLeod Hazard Museum in Columbus is in Stephen D. Lee's former home. Stephen D. Lee High School was built on part of the property. The 1953 school succeeded the overcrowded school built in 1919 on Seventh Street North that burned in 1959. That site is now home to the Columbus-Lowndes Public Library. The school was designed by the architect R. W. Naef, based in Jackson, Mississippi, in the International Style and built in 1953. It was named for former Confederate Army general Stephen D. Lee. The school was built during the early phases of the Equalization period in Mississippi. Naef was also the architect for Hunt High School (1953), built for Columbus's African American students. Following integration, Lee High School remained in use until 1992, when the city's high schools were consolidated. A historical marker commemorates the school's history.

The school's gymnasium was built in 1958 and 1959. The school was enlarged in 1967 and 1977.

== Alumni ==
- Leslie Frazier, NFL coach and former player
- Bill Johnson (Ohio politician), politician

== See also ==
- National Register of Historic Places listings in Lowndes County, Mississippi
