= Middle Fork of the Little Red River Bridge =

- U.S. National Register of Historic Places
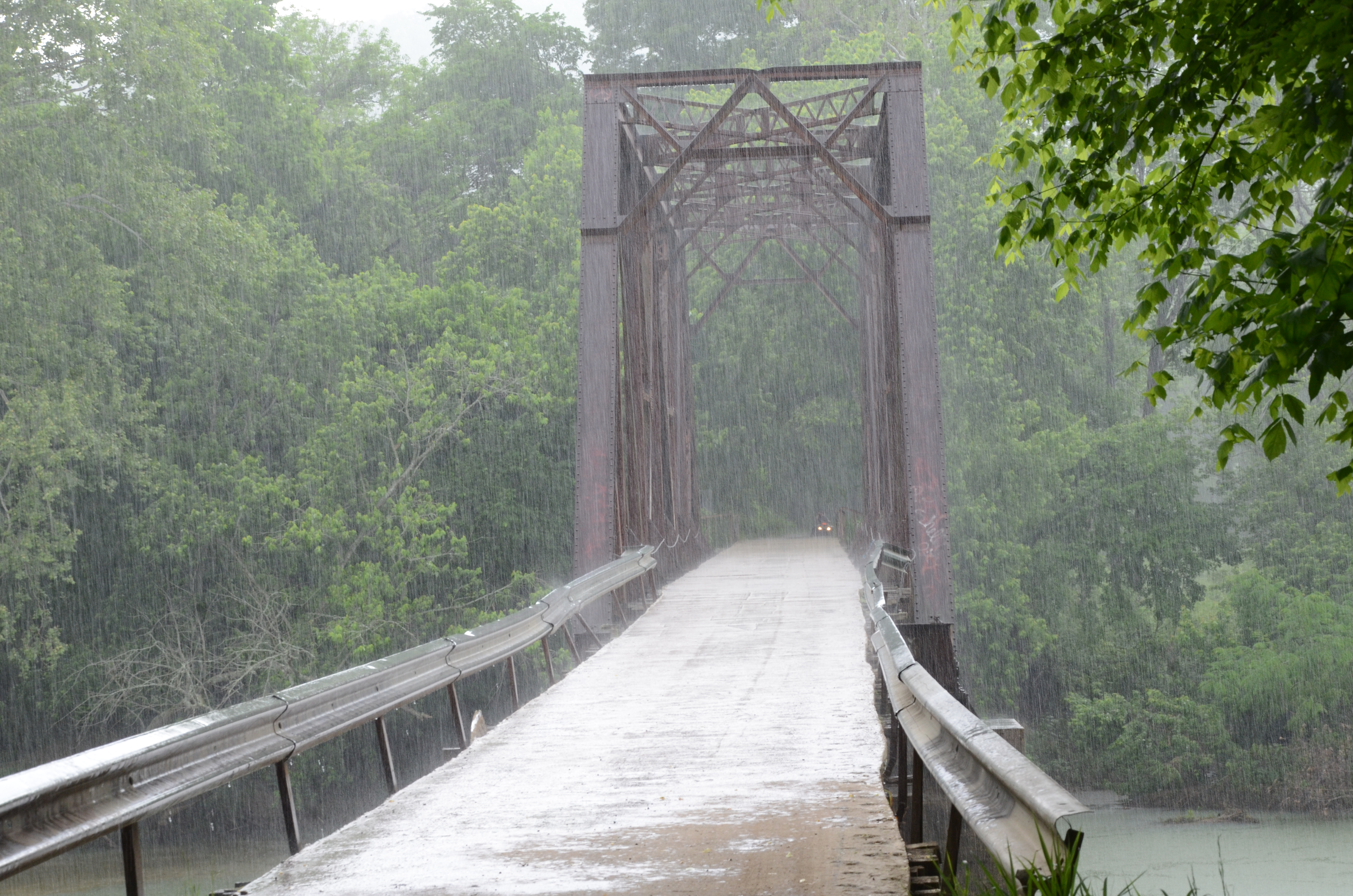

- Location within Arkansas Location within the United States
- Location: County Road 125 over the Middle Fork Little Red River, Shirley, Arkansas
- Coordinates: 35°39′34″N 92°19′19″W
- Area: less than one acre
- Built: 1908
- Architect: Wisconsin Bridge and Iron Company
- Architectural style: Baltimore through truss
- NRHP reference No.: 09001260
- Added to NRHP: January 21, 2010

The Middle Fork of the Little Red River Bridge, also known as the Shirley Railroad Bridge, is a historic bridge in Shirley, Arkansas. It is a single-span iron Baltimore through truss, with a main span 153 feet (47 m) long, and steel beam approach spans giving it a total length of 339 feet (103 m). The main span rests on large concrete piers set in the river. The bridge was built in 1908 for the Missouri and North Arkansas Railroad, and carried the railroad until 1949. In 1978 the tracks were covered by a concrete deck, and the bridge was converted to single-lane vehicular road use, carrying County Road 125.

The bridge was listed on the National Register of Historic Places in 2010.

== See also ==
- List of bridges documented by the Historic American Engineering Record in Arkansas
- List of bridges on the National Register of Historic Places in Arkansas
- National Register of Historic Places listings in Van Buren County, Arkansas
