= Seventh Street–Black River Bridge =

- U.S. National Register of Historic Places
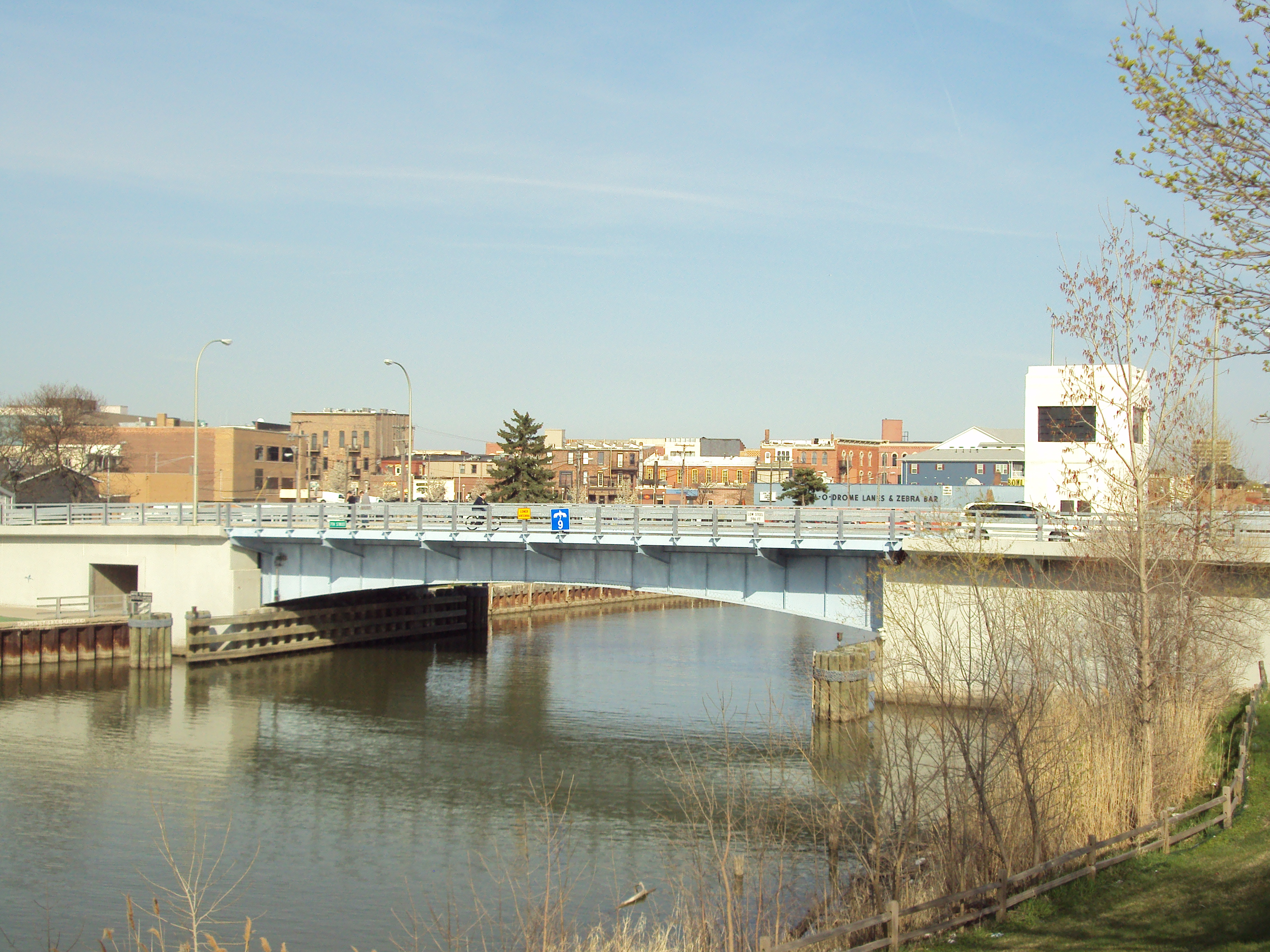

- Location within Michigan Location within the United States
- Interactive map
- Location: Seventh St. over Black River, Port Huron, Michigan
- Coordinates: 42°58′34″N 82°25′39″W
- Area: less than one acre
- Built: 1932
- Built by: Wisconsin Bridge and Iron Company, Willits Brothers
- Architect: John Alexander Low Waddell
- Architectural style: single-leaf trunnion bascule
- MPS: Highway Bridges of Michigan MPS
- NRHP reference No.: 00000045
- Added to NRHP: February 4, 2000

The Seventh Street–Black River Bridge is a bridge carrying Seventh Street over the Black River in Port Huron, Michigan. The bridge was listed on the National Register of Historic Places in 2000. It is the only single-leaf bascule bridge in the state of Michigan.

== History ==
A bridge was constructed in this location in about 1875. In 1928, the city determined that the existing structure was insufficient, being far too narrow for passing automobile traffic. The city prepared to sell bonds to raise the estimated $240,000 to build the bridge. However, the Great Depression intervened, and further action was delayed until 1931. At that time, the city hired John Alexander Low Waddell to design this bridge. Waddell completed his design by July of that year, at which time the city began demolition of the old bridge.

The city hired the firm of Willits Brothers to construct the substructure of the new bridge, which was completed by the beginning of 1932. The Wisconsin Bridge and Iron Company was hired to construct the superstructure, which they started on in late 1931 and delivered to Port Huron in mid-1932. In 1962, the bridge decking was replaced, and in 1970 a major renovation took place. Further renovations occurred in the 1970s and 1990s. Further renovation was undertaken in 2009, including the demolition and replacement of the operator's house with a design similar to the original. The bridge is still carrying traffic.

== Description ==
The Seventh Street Bridge contains a single bascule leaf spanning 114 feet. A counterweight to the leaf mass is constructed of 620 tons of reinforced concrete, placed opposite a pair of trunnions supporting the bridge on the north bank. The leaf consists of two deck plate girders spaced 35 feet apart. The flooring is a metal mesh system, installed in 1960 to replace the original Southern yellow pine flooring. The roadway is 40 feet wide, flanked by sidewalks, with railings on the outside. The entire span is 565.8 feet from railing to railing. An operator's house located at one end of the bridge was heavily modified in 1970, and demolished and replaced in 2009.
