= Green Bay Road Bridge =

Bridge in Manitowoc Rapids, Wisconsin

- U.S. National Register of Historic Places
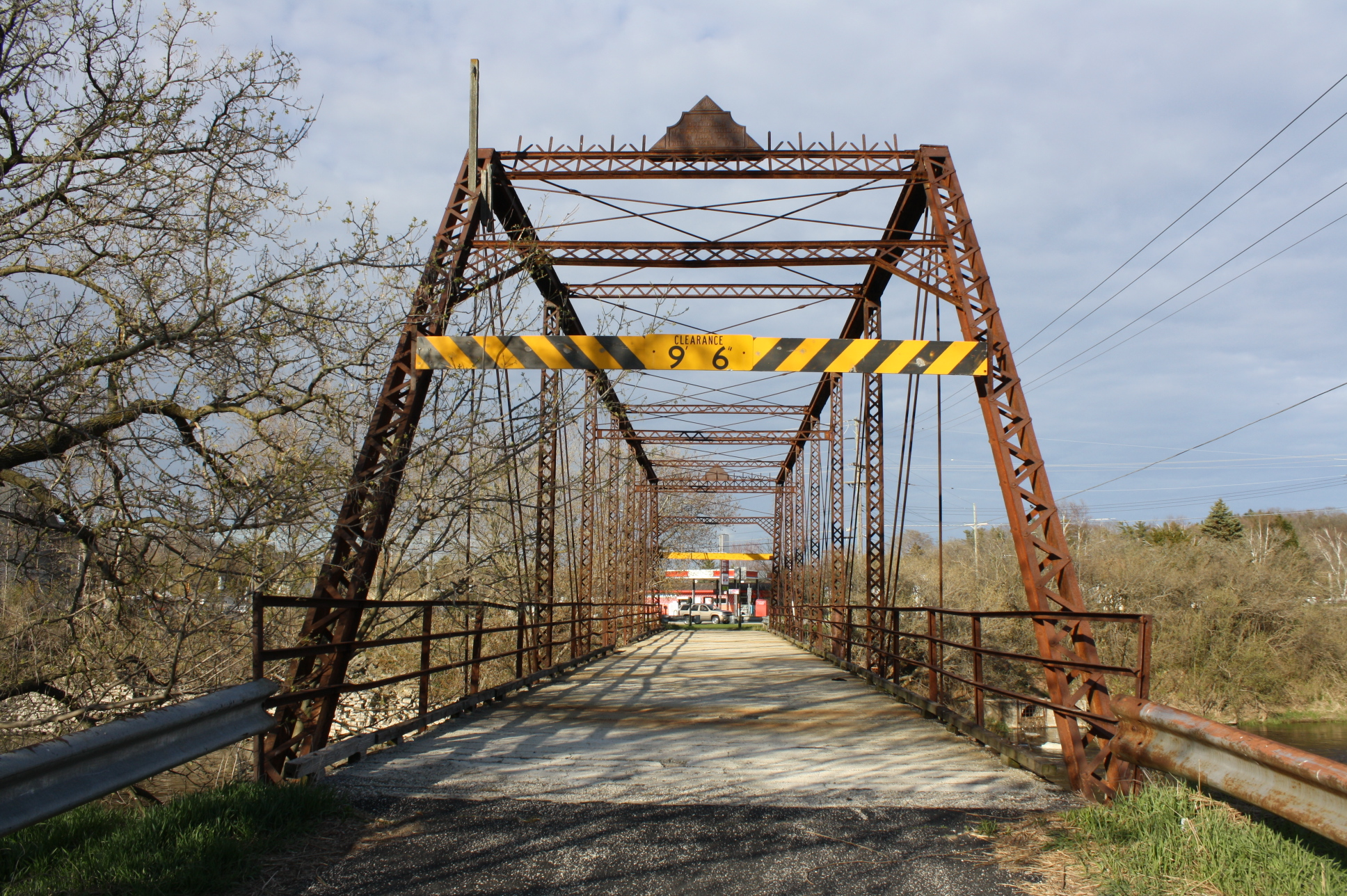

- Location within Wisconsin Location within the United States
- Location: Mill St. at Manitowoc R., Manitowoc Rapids, Wisconsin
- Coordinates: 44°5′46″N 87°42′6″W
- Area: less than one acre
- Built: 1887
- Built by: Wisconsin Bridge and Iron Company
- Architectural style: Pratt pony truss
- NRHP reference No.: 98000877
- Added to NRHP: August 3, 1998

The Green Bay Road Bridge is a Pratt pony truss bridge across the Manitowoc River in Manitowoc Rapids, Wisconsin. The 150-foot (46 m) bridge was built in 1887 by the Wisconsin Bridge and Iron Company and was the second river crossing built at its location. Originally a road bridge, the bridge is now used for a bicycle and walking trail; it is in good condition and is considered a historically significant example of a pony truss road bridge. The bridge was added to the National Register of Historic Places on August 3, 1998.
