= Charles McLaran House =

Historic mansion in Columbus, Mississippi, US

- Riverview
- U.S. National Register of Historic Places
- U.S. National Historic Landmark
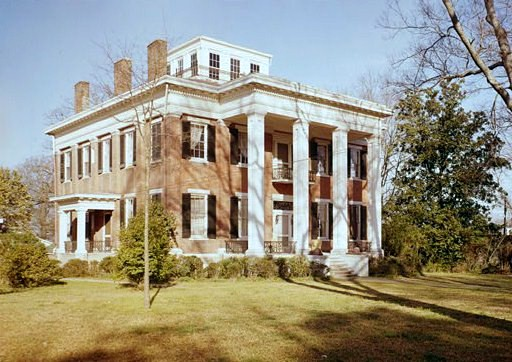

- Location within Mississippi Location within the United States
- Location: 514 Second Street South, Columbus, Mississippi
- Coordinates: 33°29′24.48″N 88°25′53.83″W
- Area: 1 acre (0.40 ha)
- Built: 1847
- Architect: James Lull
- Architectural style: Greek Revival
- NRHP reference No.: 76001102

Significant dates
- Added to NRHP: December 12, 1976
- Designated NHL: January 3, 2001

Charles McLaran House, also known as Riverview and as Burris House, is a historic mansion at 512 Second Street South in Columbus, Mississippi. Built in 1847 for a major local landowner, it is a distinctive and particularly grand and well-preserved example of Greek Revival architecture. It was declared a National Historic Landmark in 2001.

== Description and history ==
Riverview is located on a roughly 1-acre (0.40 ha) parcel, a reduced portion of its original lot, which occupied an entire city block bounded by First and Second Streets South, and by Fifth and Sixth Avenues South. The property originally housed a small estate, with a number of outbuildings accompanying the main house. Of these, only a single one remains. The property's landscaping includes mature plantings, some of which may date to its early days. The main house is a basically square brick structure, 2-1/2 stories in height, with a raised basement and a low pitch hipped roof that has a large square cupola at its center. The house has two primary facades, one facing east to Second Street, and the other to the west toward the Tombigbee River. Each is five bays wide, with the center three bays fronted by massive two-story Greek temple fronts. These porticos have paneled square pillars, which rise to a modillioned and dentillated cornice. The interior is significantly more elaborate than the exterior, with elaborate high-quality plaster and woodwork details. The central hall has a grand spiral staircase that rises up to the cupola. Details from one of the parlors are direct copies from plates appearing in Minard Lafever's 1835 The Beauties of Modern Architecture.

The house was built in 1847 for Charles McLaran, a native of Alabama who was then one of the county's largest landowners. Its design is attributed to James Lull, a native of Vermont who came to Columbus in 1837. McLaran only lived in the house until 1856, when he moved to St. Louis, Missouri.

== See also ==
- List of National Historic Landmarks in Mississippi
- National Register of Historic Places listings in Lowndes County, Mississippi
