= Sykes-Leigh House =

Historic house in Mississippi, United States

- U.S. National Register of Historic Places
- Location within Mississippi
- Location: 719--7th St. North, Columbus, Mississippi
- Coordinates: 33°30′8″N 88°25′40″W
- Area: 3.9 acres (1.6 ha)
- Built: 1838
- Architectural style: Greek Revival
- NRHP reference No.: 85000555
- Added to NRHP: March 14, 1985

The Sykes-Leigh House, also known as Rosewood Manor, is a historic mansion in Columbus, Mississippi, U.S.. It was built in 1838 for Richard Sykes, a planter. It has been listed on the National Register of Historic Places since March 14, 1985.
