= Waverly Bridge (Mississippi) =

- U.S. National Register of Historic Places
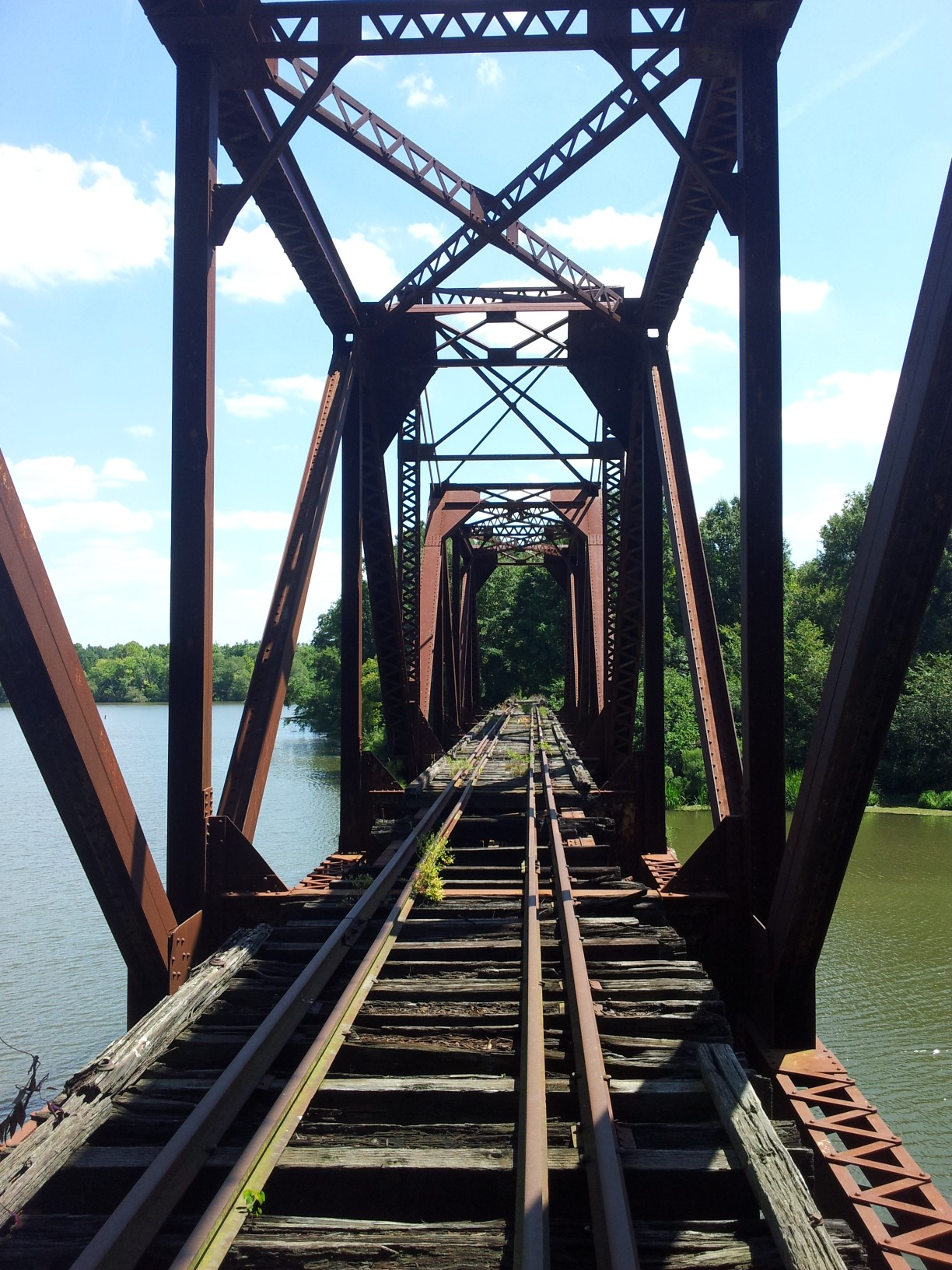

- Location within Mississippi Location within the United States
- Nearest city: Waverly, Mississippi
- Coordinates: 33°33′54″N 88°29′48″W
- Area: less than one acre
- Built: 1914
- Built by: Wisconsin Bridge and Iron Co.
- Architectural style: Swinging through truss
- MPS: Historic Bridges of Mississippi TR
- NRHP reference No.: 88002412
- Added to NRHP: March 20, 1989

The Waverly Bridge near Waverly, Mississippi is a railway swing bridge spanning between Lowndes County, Mississippi and Clay County, Mississippi. It brings the Columbus and Greenville Railway across the Tombigbee River.

It was built in 1914 by the Wisconsin Bridge and Iron Co. for the Columbus and Greenville Railway. It was listed on the National Register of Historic Places in 1989.

It is a swinging through truss bridge.
