= Saratoga, Wisconsin =

- Town
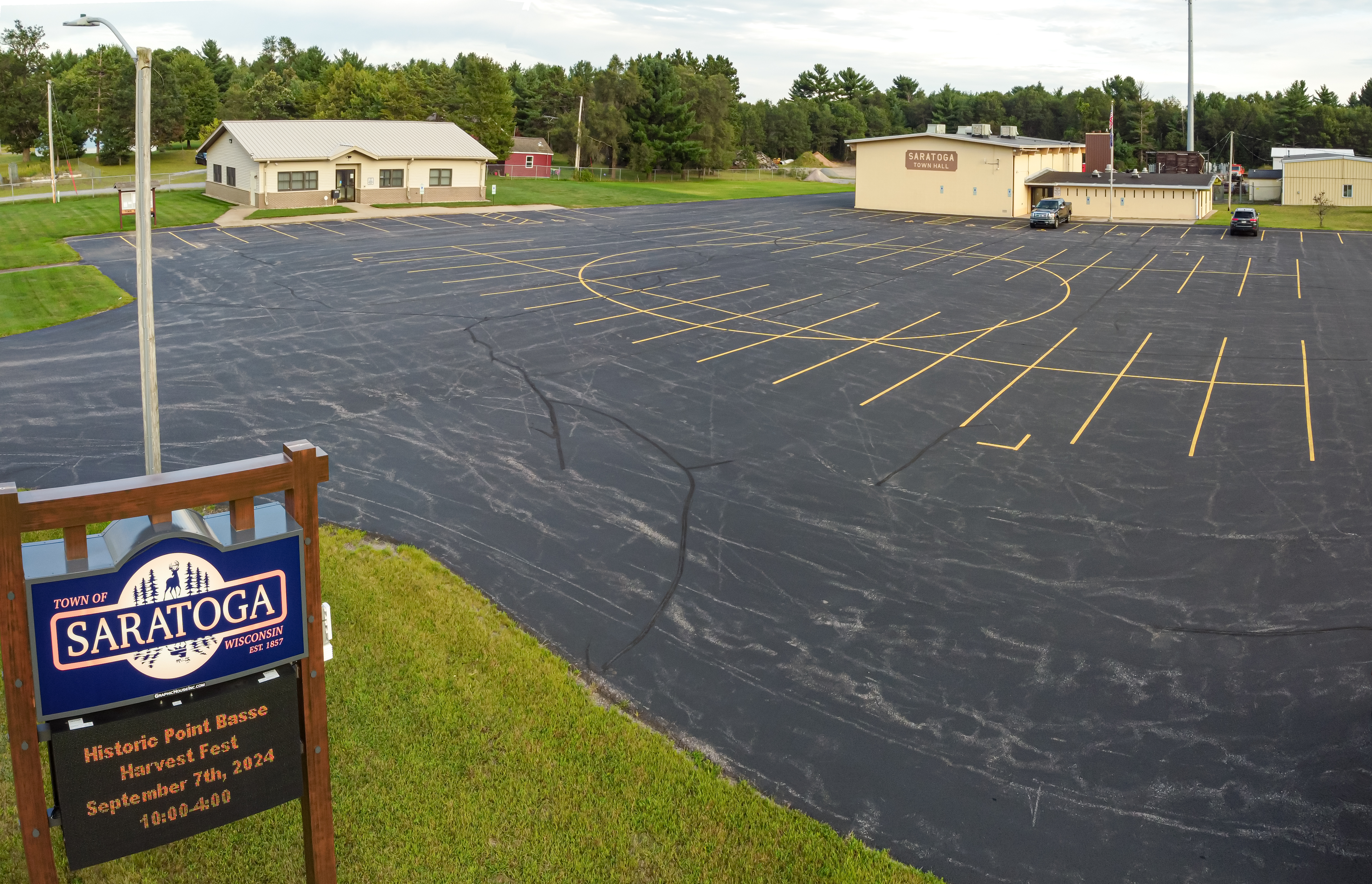
- Town hall

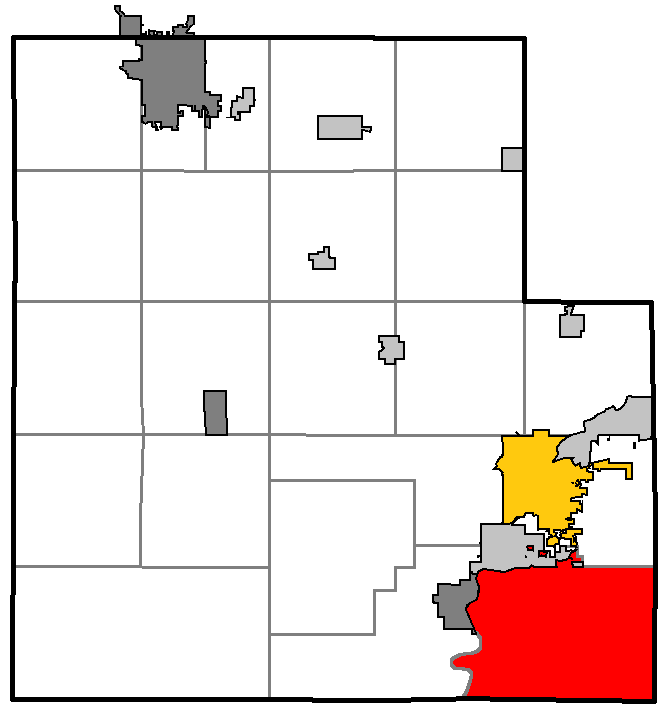
- Location of Saratoga, Wood County

- Location of Wood County, Wisconsin
- Coordinates: 44°18′3″N 89°50′5″W
- Country: United States
- State: Wisconsin
- County: Wood

Area
  - Total: 51.2 sq mi (132.5 km^{2})
  - Land: 49.4 sq mi (128.0 km^{2})
  - Water: 1.8 sq mi (4.6 km^{2})
- Elevation: 1,007 ft (307 m)

Population (2020)
  - Total: 5,060
  - Density: 102/sq mi (39.5/km^{2})
- Time zone: UTC-6 (Central (CST))
  - Summer (DST): UTC-5 (CDT)
- Area codes: 715 & 534
- FIPS code: 55-71600
- GNIS feature ID: 1584100
- PLSS township: parts of T21N R6E and T21N R5E east of the river
- Website: http://www.saratogawisconsin.org

Saratoga is a town in Wood County, Wisconsin, United States - south of Wisconsin Rapids and east of Nekoosa. As of the 2020 census, the population of the town is 5,060 people.

== History ==
The west end of the town of Saratoga, within three miles of the Wisconsin River, was in the "Indian strip," ceded by the Menominee to the U.S. government in the 1836 Treaty of the Cedars. As such, it was logged and surveyed earlier than the surrounding land. In 1839 a crew working for the U.S. government first surveyed what would become part of the town, walking through the woods and crossing the river, measuring with chain and compass. In 1851 a different crew surveyed the section lines. For the six mile square township that now is the western part of the town, see the deputy surveyor's description under Port Edwards. For the eastern township, the deputy gave this general description:

The Character of this town is easily described. It is a uniform pine barren. Soil white sand. Poor & worthless for all farming purposes. The timber poor scrubby Pitch pines & there is not probably a single quarter section in it worth Entering either(?) for soil or timber.

The town of Saratoga was established in 1857.

== Geography ==
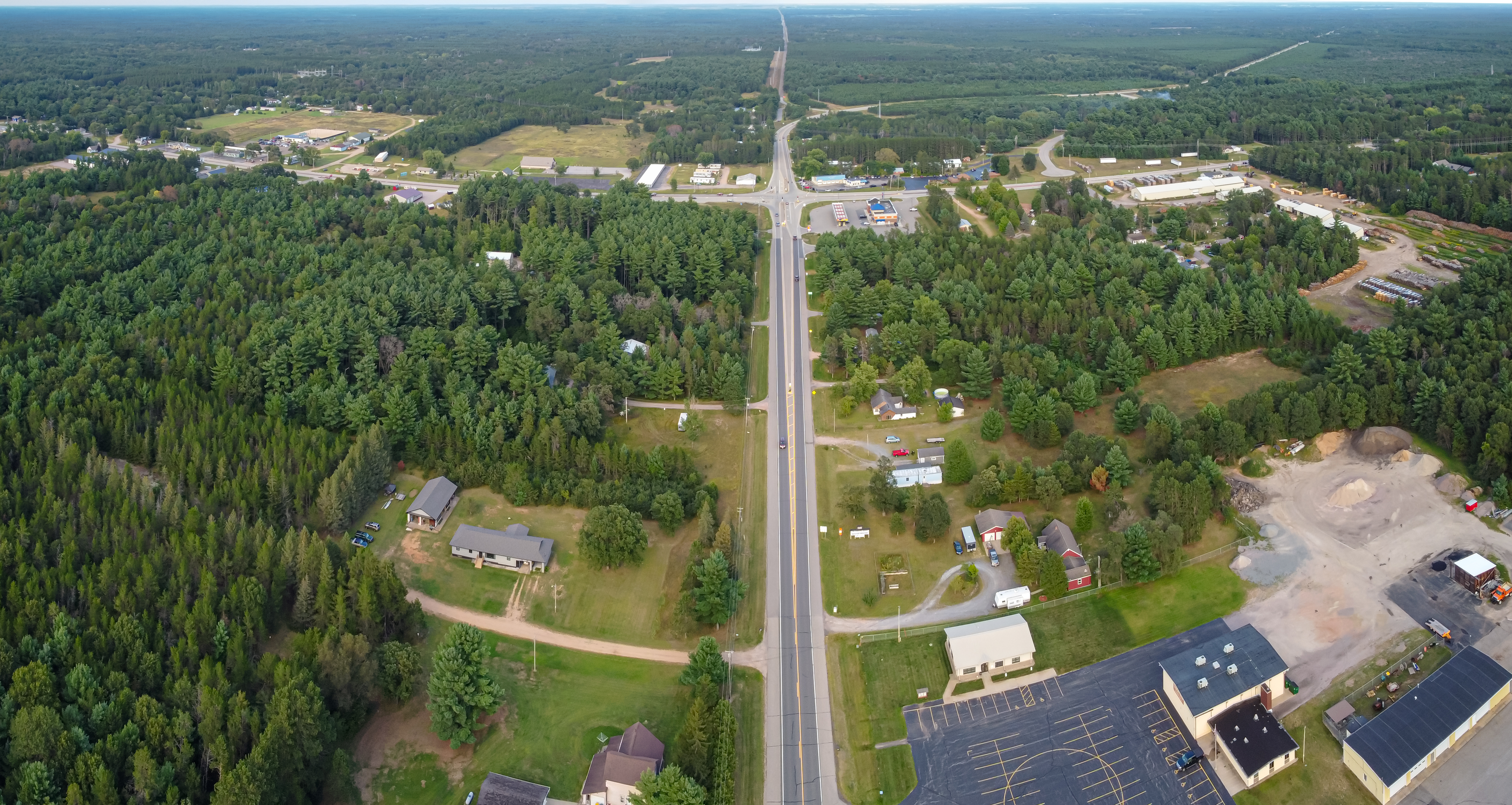

According to the United States Census Bureau, the town has a total area of 51.2 square miles (132.5 km^{2}), of which 49.4 square miles (128.0 km^{2}) is land and 1.8 square miles (4.6 km^{2}) (3.44%) is water.

== Demographics ==
According to the 2015 census, there is 5,023 people, 2,011 households, and 1,560 families residing in the town. The population density is low, it amounts to 104 people per square mile. There were 2,058 housing units at an average density of 41.6 per square mile (16.1/km^{2}). The racial makeup of the town was 97.42% White, 0.17% African American, 0.71% Native American, 0.58% Asian, 0.32% from other races, and 0.82% from two or more races. Hispanic or Latino of any race were 0.54% of the population.

There were 2,011 households, out of which 35.8% had children under the age of 18 living with them, 66.1% were married couples living together, 7.0% had a female householder with no husband present, and 22.4% were non-families. 17.1% of all households were made up of individuals, and 5.4% had someone living alone who was 65 years of age or older. The average household size was 2.66 and the average family size was 2.99.

In the town, the population was spread out, with 26.3% under the age of 18, 7.1% from 18 to 24, 29.4% from 25 to 44, 27.0% from 45 to 64, and 10.1% who were 65 years of age or older. The median age was 38 years. For every 100 females, there were 106.6 males. For every 100 females age 18 and over, there were 105.0 males.

The median income for a household in the town was $48,500, and the median income for a family was $52,750. Males had a median income of $41,518 versus $24,904 for females. The per capita income for the town was $18,761. About 3.8% of families and 5.9% of the population were below the poverty line, including 6.0% of those under age 18 and 13.0% of those age 65 or over.
