= Armstrong Creek Bridge =

- U.S. National Register of Historic Places
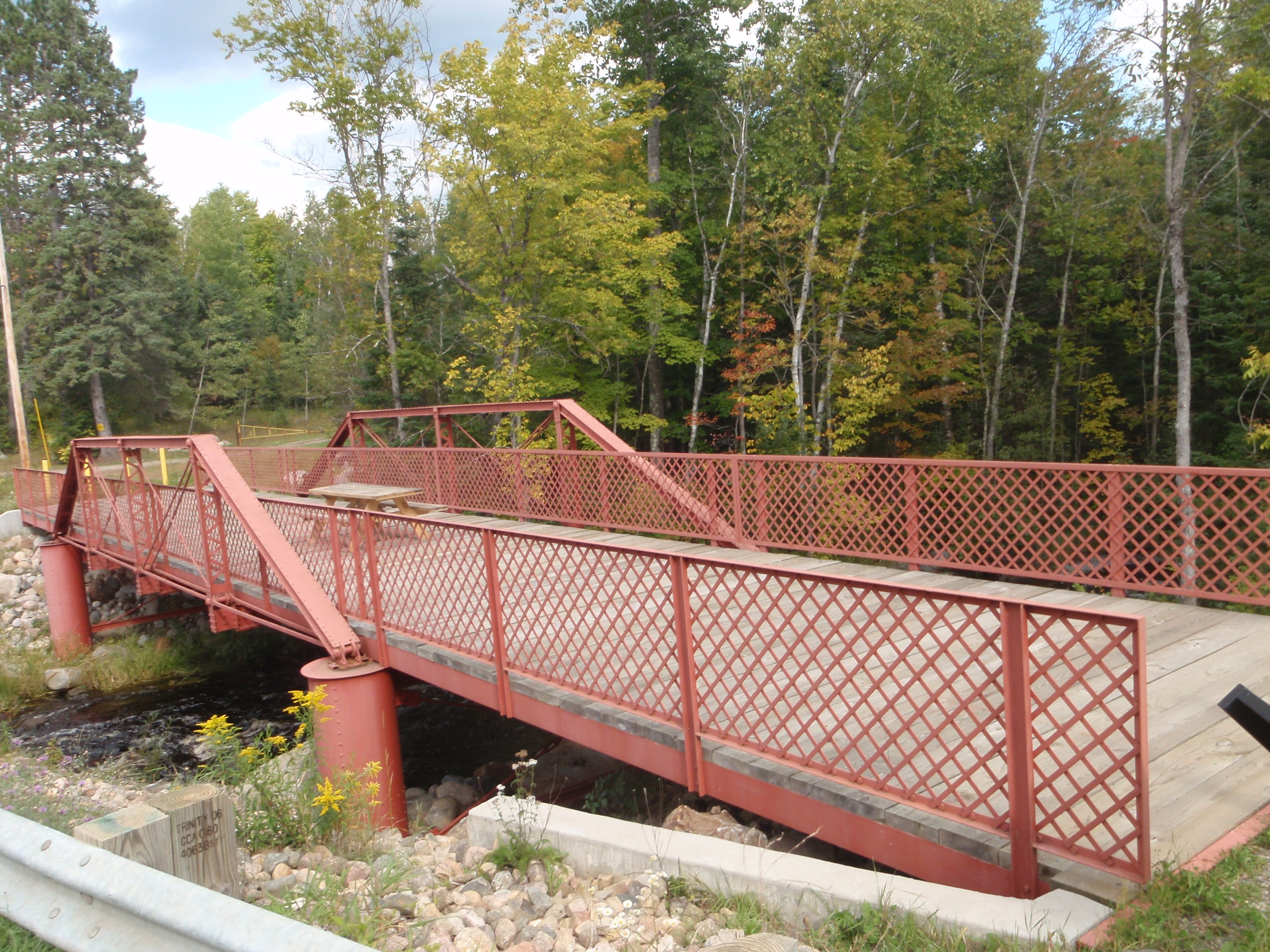
- Location: Old 101 Rd. Armstrong Creek, Wisconsin
- Coordinates: 45.64111°N 88.44634°W
- Built: 1908
- NRHP reference No.: 11000841
- Added to NRHP: November 18, 2011

The Armstrong Creek Bridge is a truss bridge located in Armstrong Creek, Wisconsin, United States. It was added to the National Register of Historic Places in 2011.

== History ==
The bridge was built on the edge of what would become the Chequamegon-Nicolet National Forest. It was originally part of Highway 101. After the highway was re-routed west of the bridge, it became a footbridge.
