= St. Francis River Bridge (Madison, Arkansas) =

- U.S. National Register of Historic Places
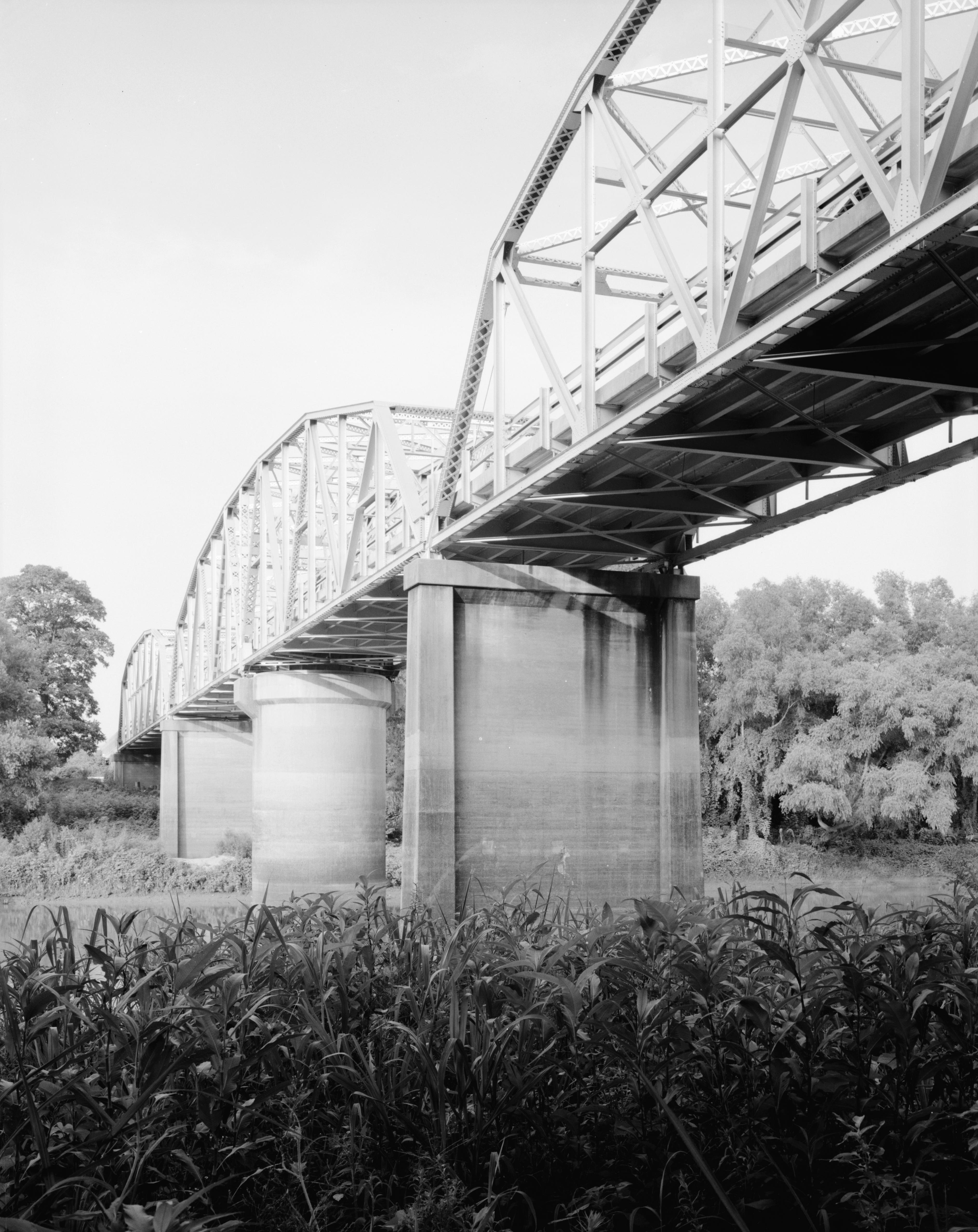
- Riverside view of the bridge

- Location within Arkansas Location within the United States
- Nearest city: Madison, Arkansas
- Coordinates: 35°2′11″N 90°42′42″W
- Area: less than one acre
- Built: 1933
- Architect: Arkansas Highway & Transportation; Wisconsin Bridge and Iron Company
- Architectural style: Swing through-truss
- MPS: Historic Bridges of Arkansas MPS
- NRHP reference No.: 90000516
- Added to NRHP: April 9, 1990

The St. Francis River Bridge carries United States Route 70 over the St. Francis River near Madison in St. Francis County, Arkansas, United States. It consists of three Parker through trusses, each 162 feet (49 m) long, and a swing bridge span 230 feet (70 m) long. With approaches, the bridge has a total length of 921 feet (281 m). The swing span is mounted on a central pier, and is rotated by two workers operating a large hickory handle. The bridge was built in 1932–33, with the swing span design made to accommodate the demands of the United States War Department that the river remain navigable by military vessels. The bridge is one of three swing-span bridges in the state. It is likely that the swinging mechanism has never been used.

The bridge was listed on the National Register of Historic Places in 1990.

== See also ==
- List of bridges documented by the Historic American Engineering Record in Arkansas
- List of bridges on the National Register of Historic Places in Arkansas
- National Register of Historic Places listings in St. Francis County, Arkansas
