= William E. Ervin House =

Historic house in Mississippi, United States

- U.S. National Register of Historic Places
- Location within Mississippi
- Nearest city: Columbus, Mississippi
- Area: 52.5 acres (21.2 ha)
- Built: 1836
- Architectural style: Greek Revival
- NRHP reference No.: 89002053
- Added to NRHP: December 1, 1989

The William E. Ervin House is a historic mansion in Columbus, Mississippi, U.S.. It was built in 1836 for William E. Ervin. It has been listed on the National Register of Historic Places since December 1, 1989.
