= Mt. Pleasant Methodist Church =

Historic church in Mississippi, United States

- U.S. National Register of Historic Places
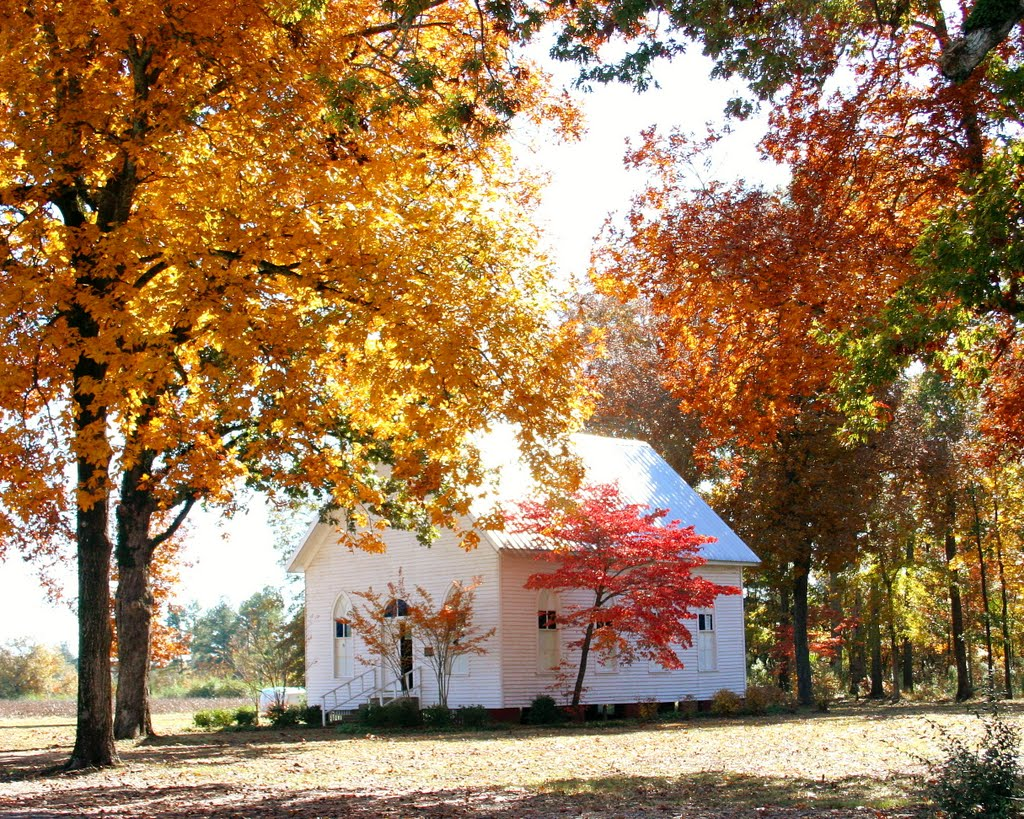

- Location within Mississippi Location within the United States
- Location: 2382 Wright Rd., Caledonia, Mississippi
- Coordinates: 33°36′31″N 88°20′11″W
- Area: 5 acres (2.0 ha)
- Built: 1892
- Built by: David Parker Tunnell
- Architectural style: Late 19th And Early 20th Century American Movements
- NRHP reference No.: 07000649
- Added to NRHP: July 5, 2007

Mt. Pleasant Methodist Church is a historic Methodist church at 2382 Wright Road in Caledonia, Mississippi.

It was built in 1892 and added to the National Register in 2007.
