= Turtleville Iron Bridge =

- U.S. National Register of Historic Places
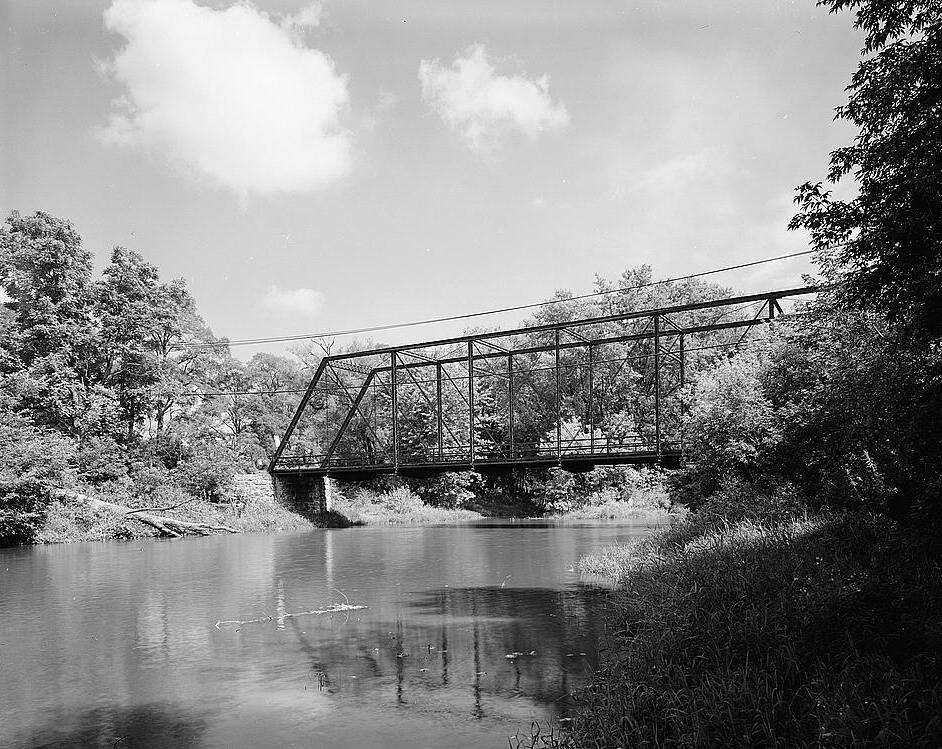
- Turtleville Iron Bridge

- Location within Wisconsin
- Location: near Beloit, Wisconsin
- Coordinates: 42.5655615°N 88.9645949°W
- Area: 0.2 acres (0.081 ha)
- Built: 1887
- Built by: Wisconsin Bridge and Iron Company
- Architectural style: Pratt Truss
- NRHP reference No.: 77000053
- Added to NRHP: September 15, 1977

The Turtleville Iron Bridge is an overhead truss bridge built in 1887 where South Lathers Road crosses Turtle Creek near Beloit, Wisconsin. It was added to the National Register of Historic Places in 1977.

Turtleville was settled in 1838, growing around a dam and mill and once including a distillery, a store, a blacksmith shop, a school, church, and the once-elegant Hodson House. Turtleville has since faded into a rural residential community, but the cemetery and bridge survive from that era.

The bridge is a single-span, 141-foot-long (43 m), Pratt truss bridge built by the Wisconsin Bridge and Iron Company, and is perhaps one of its earlier truss bridges. The structure includes eye bars, pin connections, counter rods with turnbuckles, and a wooden deck. Around 1890 bridge construction was transitioning from wrought iron to steel, and the bridge is a rare surviving example of the earlier technology.

In 2025, Rock County and the Wisconsin Department of Transportation announced that it would offer the bridge to anyone for free so long as they would move it to a new location and maintain its historic character for at least a decade.

== See also ==
- List of bridges documented by the Historic American Engineering Record in Wisconsin
