= Harris-Banks House =

Historic house in Mississippi, United States

- U.S. National Register of Historic Places
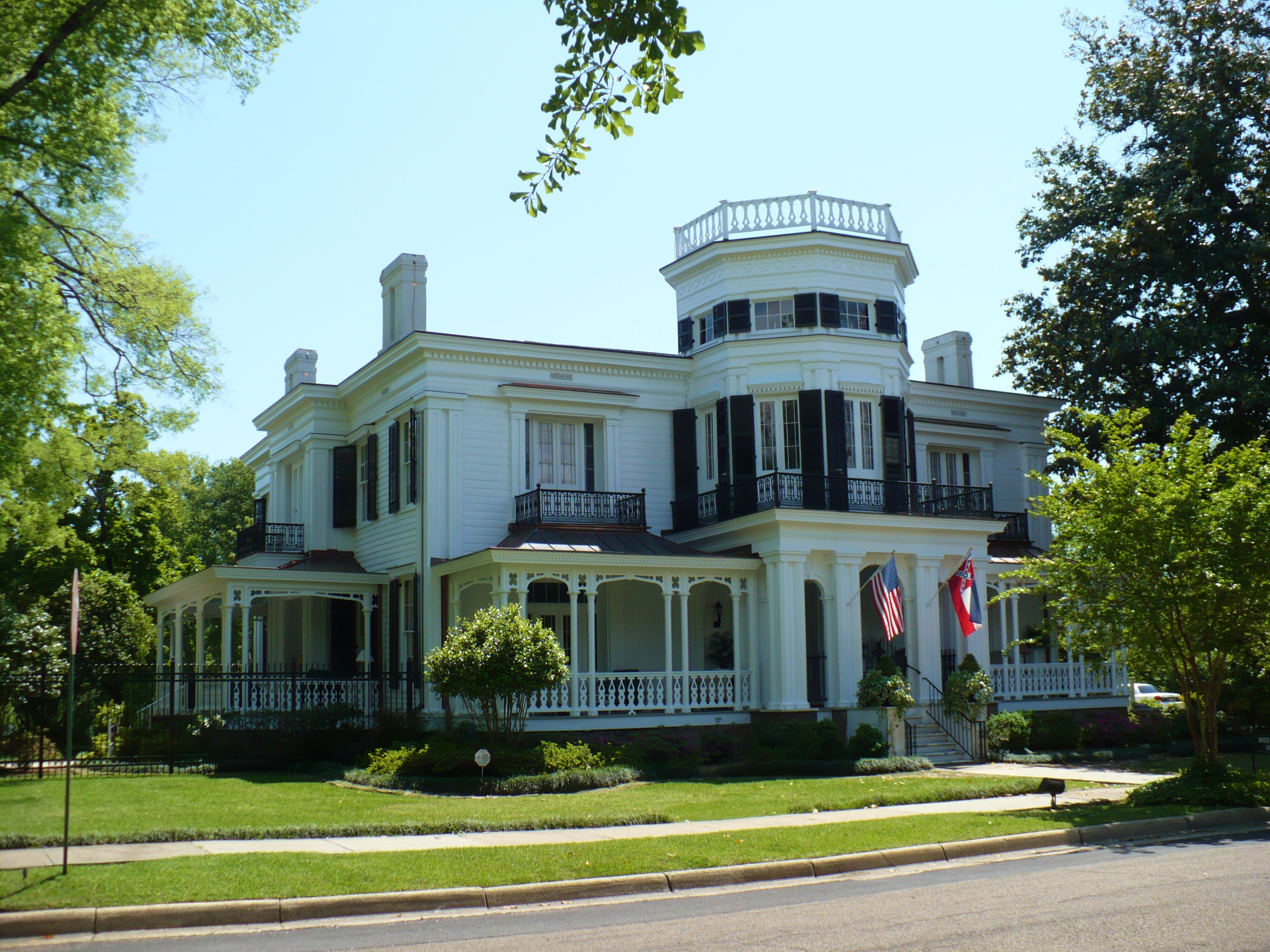

- Location within Mississippi
- Location: 122 7th Ave. S., Columbus, Mississippi
- Coordinates: 33°29′17″N 88°25′52″W
- Area: less than one acre
- Built: 1857
- Architectural style: Italianate
- NRHP reference No.: 78001617
- Added to NRHP: November 16, 1978

The Harris-Banks House, also known as White Arches, is a historic mansion in Columbus, Mississippi, U.S.. It was built from 1857 to 1861 for Jeptha Vining Harris, a cotton planter. It stayed in the Harris family until 1967. It has been listed on the National Register of Historic Places since November 16, 1978.
