= Weaver Place =

Historic house in Mississippi, United States

- U.S. National Register of Historic Places
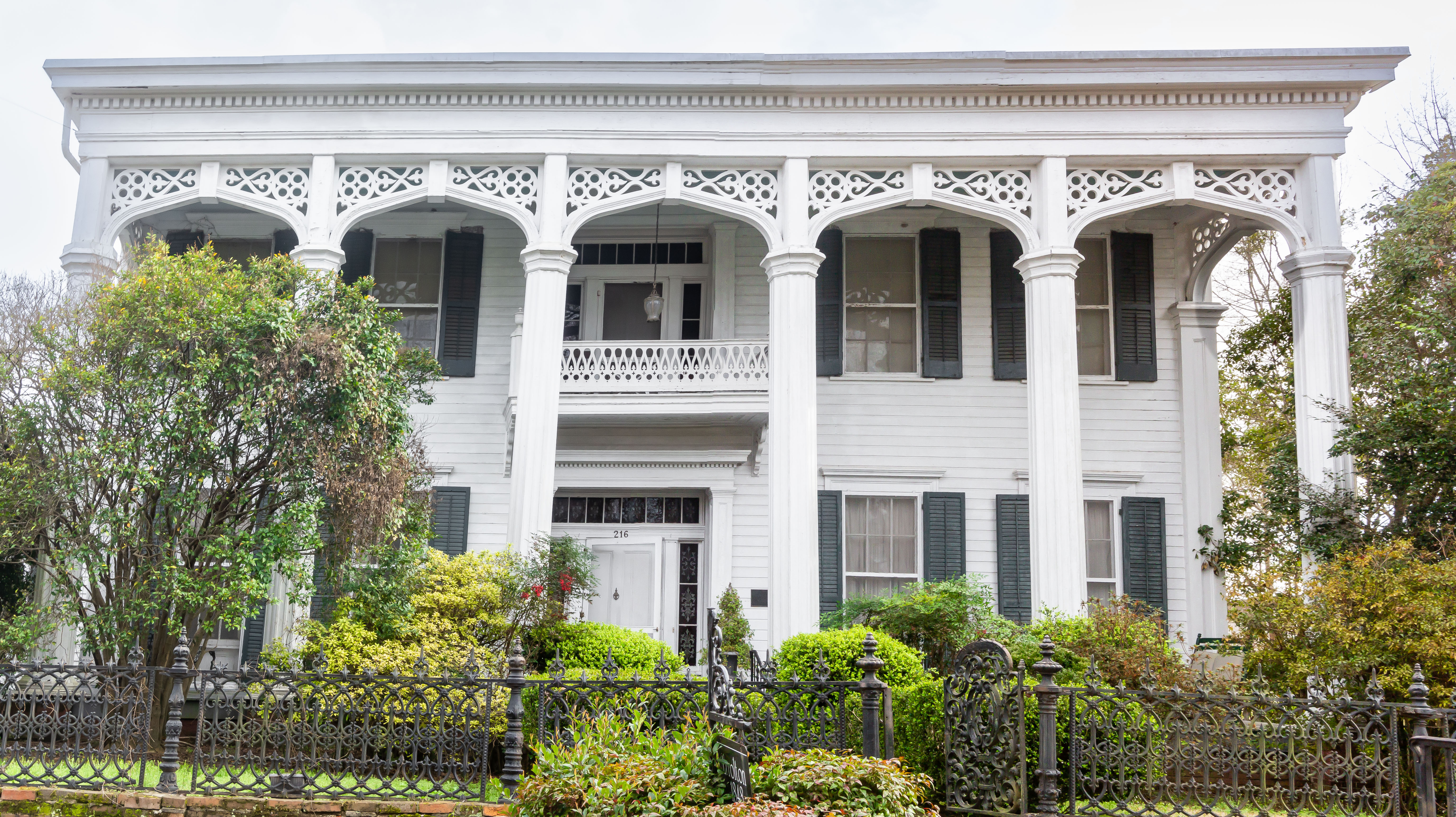

- Location within Mississippi Location within the United States
- Location: 216 3rd Avenue South; Columbus, Mississippi
- Coordinates: 33°29′33″N 88°25′46″W
- Area: 1 acre (0.40 ha)
- Built: 1854
- NRHP reference No.: 78001621
- Added to NRHP: November 16, 1978

Weaver Place (a.k.a. Errolton) is a historic house in Columbus, Mississippi, United States.

== Location ==
It is located at 216 3rd Avenue South in Columbus, Mississippi.

== Overview ==
The house was built in the 1840s. It was the private residence of Frederick Tolbert Weaver and his wife, Susan Elizabeth (Smith) Weaver.

It has been listed on the National Register of Historic Places since November 16, 1978.
