= Manitowoc Rapids, Wisconsin =

- Town
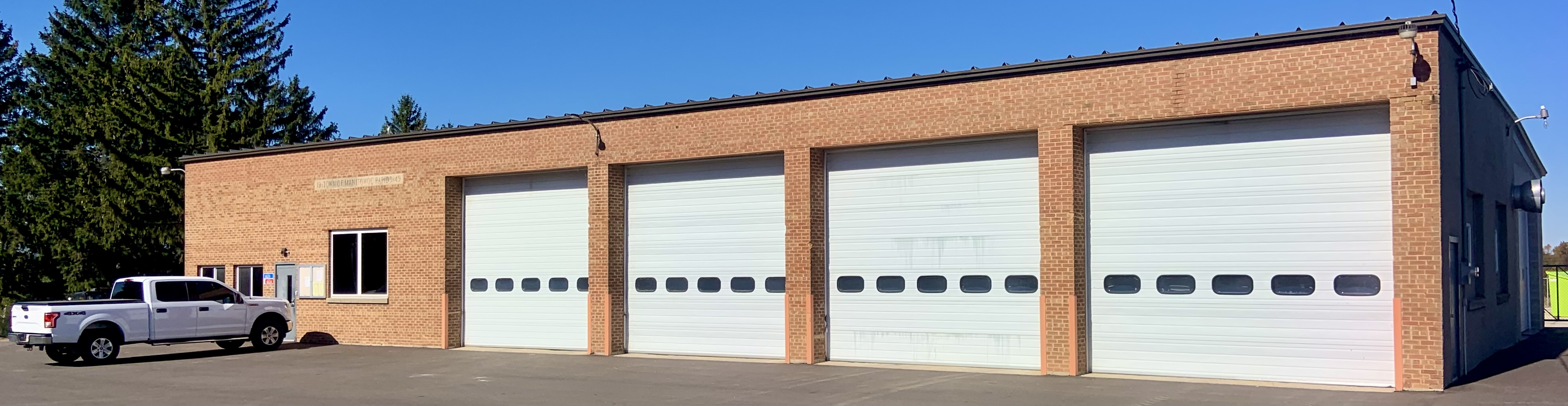
- Town hall

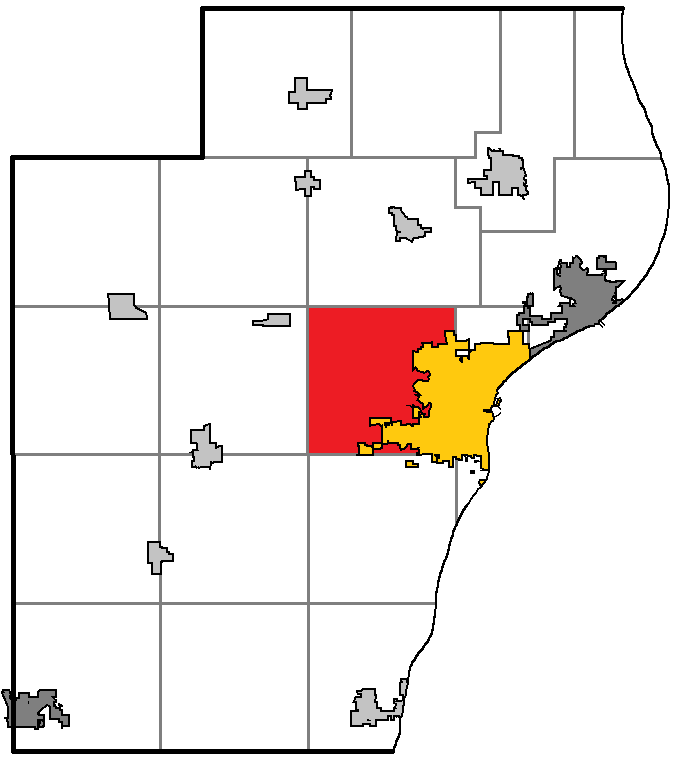
- Location of Manitowoc Rapids, within Manitowoc County
- Coordinates: 44°6′8″N 87°44′7″W
- Country: United States
- State: Wisconsin
- County: Manitowoc

Area
  - Total: 27.6 sq mi (71.5 km^{2})
  - Land: 27.4 sq mi (70.9 km^{2})
  - Water: 0.27 sq mi (0.7 km^{2})
- Elevation: 735 ft (224 m)

Population (2020)
  - Total: 2,114
  - Density: 77.2/sq mi (29.8/km^{2})
- Time zone: UTC-6 (Central (CST))
  - Summer (DST): UTC-5 (CDT)
- Area code: 920
- FIPS code: 55-48575
- GNIS feature ID: 1583638
- Website: townofmanitowocrapids.org

Manitowoc Rapids is a town in Manitowoc County, Wisconsin, United States. The population was 2,114 at the 2020 census.

== Branch ==
Branch is an unincorporated community located north of US 10 along the river of the same name in between Whitelaw and I-43.

== Geography ==
According to the United States Census Bureau, the town has a total area of 27.6 square miles (71.5 km^{2}), of which 27.4 square miles (70.9 km^{2}) is land and 0.2 square miles (0.6 km^{2}) (0.91%) is water.

== Demographics ==
As of the census of 2000, there were 2,520 people, 809 households, and 669 families residing in the town. The population density was 92.1 people per square mile (35.6/km^{2}). There were 822 housing units at an average density of 30.0 per square mile (11.6/km^{2}). The racial makeup of the town was 98.97% White, 0.16% African American, 0.16% Native American, 0.12% Asian, 0.48% from other races, and 0.12% from two or more races. Hispanic or Latino people of any race were 0.95% of the population.

There were 809 households, out of which 34.1% had children under the age of 18 living with them, 76.5% were married couples living together, 3.3% had a female householder with no husband present, and 17.3% were non-families. 14.1% of all households were made up of individuals, and 6.1% had someone living alone who was 65 years of age or older. The average household size was 2.78 and the average family size was 3.08.

In the town, the population was spread out, with 22.5% under the age of 18, 6.7% from 18 to 24, 22.9% from 25 to 44, 27.9% from 45 to 64, and 20.0% who were 65 years of age or older. The median age was 44 years. For every 100 females, there were 86.7 males. For every 100 females age 18 and over, there were 81.4 males.

The median income for a household in the town was $56,548, and the median income for a family was $61,575. Males had a median income of $37,083 versus $24,301 for females. The per capita income for the town was $21,323. About 1.4% of families and 11.1% of the population were below the poverty line, including 4.4% of those under age 18 and 34.1% of those age 65 or over.

== Education ==
Much of the town is in the Manitowoc Public School District while western portions are in the Two Rivers School District.

Silver Lake College, later Holy Family College, was partly in Manitowoc Rapids.

== Notable people ==
- Isaac Craite, Wisconsin judge, businessman, and legislator
- Charles H. Walker, Wisconsin judge, lawyer, and legislator

== Recreation ==
Branch Recreation Park is located in Branch in Manitowoc Rapids. Along with many youth softball and baseball programs, the park is home to the Branch Blaze amateur baseball team.
