= 1980–81 Sheffield Shield season =

Australian cricket tournament

1980–81 Sheffield Shield
- Dates: 17 October 1980 – 10 March 1981
- Administrator(s): Cricket Australia
- Cricket format: First-class
- Tournament format(s): Double round-robin
- Champions: Western Australia (8th title)
- Participants: 6
- Matches: 25
- Player of the series: Greg Chappell (Queensland)
- Most runs: Greg Chappell (Queensland) (906)
- Most wickets: Bruce Yardley (Western Australia) (40)

The 1980–81 Sheffield Shield season was the 79th season of the Sheffield Shield, the domestic first-class cricket competition in Australia. It started on 17 October 1980 and finished on 9 March 1981. Going into the final round of matches, New South Wales, Western Australia and Queensland were all in a position to win the Shield. It would be Western Australia, who found form in the second half of the season with four straight victories, who would emerge victorious, drawing against Queensland to secure its eighth championship.

== Match summaries ==
17–20 October 1980

Queensland (H)	v	New South Wales
189 (66.5 overs); Greg Chappell 94; Len Pascoe 4/38 (15.5 overs)		5/304d (100 overs); Ian Davis 91*; Carl Rackemann 3/43 (23 overs)
295 (84.3 overs); Greg Chappell 113; Graeme Beard 3/61 (23 overs)		0/37 (10 overs)

Match drawn
Brisbane Cricket Ground, Brisbane
Umpires: Mick Harvey and Mel Johnson

- New South Wales won the toss and elected to field.
- Mike Whitney (New South Wales) made his first-class debut.
- Points: Queensland 4 (Batting 1, Bowling 3); New South Wales 11 (Batting 6, Bowling 5)

17–20 October 1980

Victoria	v	Western Australia (H)
183 (67.5 overs); Ray Bright 36; Dennis Lillee 5/57 (25.5 overs)		303 (110.2 overs); Graeme Wood 78; Max Walker 4/82 (43.2 overs)
268 (92.4 overs); Shaun Graf 64; Bruce Yardley 5/112 (37.4 overs)		3/149 (34.3 overs); Rob Langer 75*; Max Walker 2/44 (11 overs)

Western Australia won by 7 wickets
WACA, Perth
Umpires: Peter McConnell and Don Weser

- Western Australia won the toss and elected to field.
- Points: Western Australia 19 (Batting 4, Bowling 5); Victoria 5 (Batting 1, Bowling 4)

23–26 October 1980

New South Wales (H)	v	Western Australia
3/340d (100 overs); Rick McCosker 168		176 (74.2 overs); Ken McEwan 41; Geoff Lawson 4/34 (19.2 overs)
		103 f/o (46.5 overs); Bruce Laird 24; Bob Holland 4/30 (14 overs)

New South Wales won by an innings and 61 runs
Sydney Cricket Ground, Sydney
Umpires: Rocky Harris and Arthur Watson

- New South Wales won the toss and elected to bat.
- Points: New South Wales 22 (Batting 7, Bowling 5); Western Australia 3 (Batting 1, Bowling 2)

23–26 October 1980

Tasmania	v	South Australia (H)
395 (124.1 overs); Brian Davison 126; Wayne Prior 4/92 (21 overs)		9/465d (130.5 overs); Peter Sleep 102*; Stuart Saunders 4/154 (37.5 overs)
137 (64.3 overs); Roger Woolley 41*; Ashley Mallett 3/25 (27 overs)		4/68 (24.2 overs); Jeff Crowe 24

South Australia won by 6 wickets
Adelaide Oval, Adelaide
Umpires: Tony Crafter and Bruce Martin

- Tasmania won the toss and elected to bat.
- Points: South Australia 20 (Batting 7, Bowling 3); Tasmania 9 (Batting 6, Bowling 3)

24–27 October 1980

Victoria	v	Queensland (H)
7/250d (99.3 overs); Graham Matthews 62; Greg Chappell 3/29 (18.3 overs)		5/358d (120.2 overs); Kepler Wessels 134; Ray Bright 3/80 (23.2 overs)

Match drawn
Brisbane Cricket Ground, Brisbane
Umpires: Mel Johnson and Tom Warwick

- Victoria won the toss and elected to bat
- Rain washed out all of Day 2 and most of Day 3
- Greg Ritchie (Queensland) made his first-class debut
- Points: Queensland 10 (Batting 6, Bowling 4); Victoria 7 (Batting 4, Bowling 3)

30 October–1 November 1980

New South Wales	v	South Australia (H)
338 (125.2 overs); Ian Davis 64; Rodney Hogg 4/50 (28 overs)		89 (40.5 overs); David Hookes 17; Len Pascoe 5/27 (11.5 overs)
		152 f/o (78.1 overs); Rick Darling 46; Bob Holland 4/50 (28 overs)

New South Wales won by an innings and 97 runs
Adelaide Oval, Adelaide
Umpires: Peter Cronin and Max O'Connell

- South Australia won the toss and elected to field
- Jeff Hammond (South Australia) made his final first-class appearance
- Len Pascoe completed a hat-trick in South Australia's first innings
- Points: New South Wales 20 (Batting 5, Bowling 5); South Australia 2 (Bowling 2)

31 October–3 November 1980

Western Australia	v	Queensland (H)
261 (82 overs); Bruce Yardley 78; Trevor Hohns 3/24 (6 overs)		439 (136.5 overs); Greg Chappell 194; Dennis Lillee 6/97 (46 overs)
420 (135.1 overs); Kim Hughes 149; Carl Rackemann 3/9 (14 overs)		0/82 (25 overs); Kepler Wessels 39*

Match drawn
Brisbane Cricket Ground, Brisbane
Umpires: Mick Harvey and Mel Johnson

- Western Australia won the toss and elected to bat
- Ian Kelly (Queensland) made his first-class debut
- Carl Rackemann (Queensland) suffered a pulled shoulder muscle during Western Australia's second innings and was unavailable to bowl on Day 4.
- Points: Queensland 11 (Batting 6, Bowling 5); Western Australia 6 (Batting 4, Bowling 2)

5–7 March 1981

New South Wales (H)	v	Tasmania
222 (82.3 overs); Rick McCosker 88; Rod McCurdy 3/37 (16.3 overs)		226 (93.2 overs); Brian Davison 82; Geoff Lawson 3/41 (22 overs)
5/297d (102 overs); Dirk Wellham 128*; Rod McCurdy 4/52 (21 overs)		133 (60.2 overs); Rob Jeffery 47; David Hourn 6/33 (14.2 overs)

New South Wales won by 160 runs
Sydney Cricket Ground, Sydney
Umpires: Michael Jay and Arthur Watson

- Tasmania won the toss and elected to field.
- Rick McCosker retired hurt in the New South Wales first innings having scored 61 (team score 0/120) – he returned when the score was 4/157
- Points: New South Wales 17 (Batting 2, Bowling 5); Tasmania 8 (Batting 3, Bowling 5)

6–9 March 1981

South Australia	v	Victoria (H)
6/312d (101 overs); Wayne B. Phillips 111; Ian Callen 2/44 (14 overs)		2/328d (100 overs); Paul Hibbert 153*; Ashley Mallett 2/105 (35 overs)
5/309d (106.5 overs); Wayne B. Phillips 91		5/164 (50 overs); Graham Yallop 66; John Inverarity 2/15 (6 overs)

Match drawn
Kardinia Park, Geelong
Umpires: Ray Isherwood and Angelo Nicosia

- South Australia won the toss and elected to bat.
- This was Ashley Mallett's final appearance in first-class cricket
- Points: Victoria 10 (Batting 7, Bowling 3); South Australia 7 (Batting 6, Bowling 1)

6–9 March 1981

Western Australia (H)	v	Queensland
8/305d (85.3 overs); Greg Shipperd 140; Greg Chappell 4/66 (19.3 overs)		186 (66.4 overs); Martin Kent 67; Terry Alderman 4/33 (11.4 overs)
289 (121.1 overs); Craig Serjeant 72; Jeff Thomson 4/63 (19.1 overs)		9/232 (77 overs); Allan Border 83*; Bruce Yardley 3/34 (19 overs)

Match drawn
WACA Ground, Perth
Umpires: Peter McConnell and Don Weser

- Queensland won the toss and elected to field.
- Greg Ritchie (Queensland) retired hurt in the Queensland first innings having scored 0 (team score 3/59) – he returned when the score was 6/142
- Points: Western Australia 11 (Batting 6, Bowling 5); Queensland 5 (Batting 1, Bowling 4)

== Points table ==
Team	Pld	W	L	D	BatBP	BowBP	Adj	Pts	Quot
Western Australia	9	5	2	2	39	36		125	1.070
New South Wales	9	4	1	4	45	37		122	1.487
Queensland	9	3	0	6	51	37		118	1.278
Victoria	9	3	2	4	32	29		91	1.040
Tasmania	5	0	5	0	21	18	31.2	70.2	0.571
South Australia	9	1	6	2	28	31		69	0.708

== Statistics ==
=== Most runs ===
Player	Team	Mat	Inns	NO	Runs	Ave	HS	100	50
Greg Chappell	Queensland	7	10	2	906	113.25	194	4	3
John Dyson	New South Wales	7	11	2	815	90.55	152	3	4
Martin Kent	Queensland	9	16	4	809	67.41	171	2	5
Kepler Wessels	Queensland	9	16	2	747	53.35	160	2	2
Brian Davison	Tasmania	5	10		697	69.70	173	4	2

=== Most wickets ===
Player	Team	Mat	Balls	Runs	Wkts	Avge	BBI	SR	5WI	10WM
Bruce Yardley	Western Australia	9	2261	968	40	24.20	7/62	56.5	3	1
Jeff Thomson	Queensland	9	1853	914	36	25.38	5/61	51.4	1	
Len Pascoe	New South Wales	7	1457	659	35	18.82	5/27	41.6	1	
Geoff Lawson	New South Wales	9	1917	845	35	24.14	5/50	54.7	1	
Terry Alderman	Western Australia	8	1474	747	32	23.34	4/33	46.0		
Dennis Lillee	Western Australia	7	1743	765	32	23.90	6/97	54.4	2	
