= Sylvester Smith =

Sylvester Smith may refer to:

- Sylvester C. Smith (1858–1913), U.S. Representative from California
- Sylvester Smith (American football) (born 2005), American football player
- Sylvester Smith (Latter Day Saints) (1806–1880), early Latter Day Saint leader
- Sylvester Smith (tennis)
- Sylvester Smith Farmstead
