= Jumbo, Arkansas =

- Unincorporated community
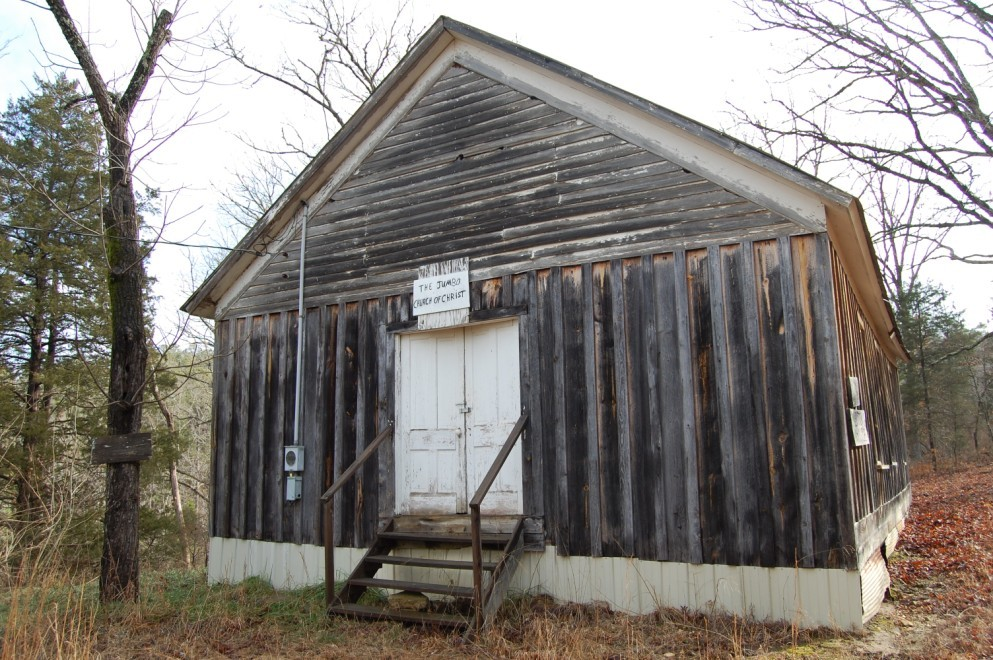
- Jumbo Church of Christ

- Location within Arkansas Location within the United States
- Coordinates: 36°03′36″N 91°58′47″W
- Country: United States
- State: Arkansas
- County: Izard
- Elevation: 495 ft (151 m)
- Time zone: UTC-6 (CST)
  - Summer (DST): UTC-5 (CDT)
- GNIS feature ID: 50759

Jumbo is an unincorporated community in Izard County, Arkansas, United States.

== History ==
The settlement was originally located on Mill Creek, 5 mi (8.0 km) west of its present location.

J. J. Vest and his family were early settlers, arriving in the area in 1873. Vest operated a grist mill and general store, and in 1877, he organized Saint's Rest Baptist Church. In 1888, Vest moved the church to Wideman (later named Boswell) in Izard County.

When a post office was established in 1891, the settlement was officially named "Jumbo" due to a misreading by the US Postal Service of "Jimbo Smith", one of the settlement's founders. Jumbo had several houses, in addition to the grist mill, general store, and post office.

Thirty years after its founding, river flooding forced residents to move Jumbo to its present location, closer to the county seat Melbourne. By 1927, Jumbo was "thriving" at its new location, with a general store, saw mill, cotton gin, blacksmith shop, grist mill, and several residences.

Jumbo Church of Christ was completed in 1928 and was used for religious purposes, as well as a school, meeting hall, and voting place. The church is listed on National Register of Historic Places.

Jumbo began to decline in 1949 when the area's small rural schools and voting places were consolidated to Melbourne. Residents began moving to Melbourne and other areas, and by the 1960s few people still resided in Jumbo, and its businesses had closed. The church held services intermittently until it was abandoned in 1984.
