= Robert Jeffery =

Robert Jeffery may refer to:

- Robert Jeffery (cricketer) (born 1953), Australian cricketer
- Robert Emmett Jeffery (1875–1935), American lawyer, politician, and diplomat
- Bob Jeffery (1935–2016), Anglican priest

== See also ==
- Robert Jeffrey (1934–2004), Canadian singer and actor
- Robert H. Jeffrey (1873–1961), mayor of Columbus, Ohio
