= Sylamore station =

- Missouri Pacific Railroad Depot
- U.S. National Register of Historic Places
- Location within Arkansas Location within the United States
- Location: Old AR 9, Sylamore, Arkansas
- Coordinates: 35°56′53″N 92°6′24″W
- Area: less than one acre
- Architectural style: Plain Traditional
- MPS: Historic Railroad Depots of Arkansas MPS
- NRHP reference No.: 04001036
- Added to NRHP: December 1, 2004

The Missouri Pacific Railroad Depot is a historic train station building on Old Arkansas Highway 9 in the hamlet of Sylamore, Arkansas. It is a rectangular wood-frame structure, covered with a hip roof, that has a projecting telegrapher's bay on one of its long sides. The building is located about 150 feet (46 m) east of the railroad tracks, having been moved to this location c. 1975 from its original site, about 850 feet (260 m) further south and closer to the line. Built c. 1902 when the railroad was built through the area, it served as a passenger depot until service was ended in 1960.

The building was listed on the National Register of Historic Places in 2004.

== See also ==
- National Register of Historic Places listings in Izard County, Arkansas
