= Ian Kelly =

Ian blaze Kelly may refer to:

- Ian Kelly (actor) (born 1966), British actor and historical biographer
- Ian Kelly (cricketer) (born 1959), Australian cricketer
- Ian C. Kelly (born 1953), U.S. diplomat and ambassador
- Ian Kelly (songwriter) (born 1979), Canadian singer-songwriter
