= Calico Rock Methodist Episcopal Church =

Historic church in Arkansas, United States

- U.S. National Register of Historic Places
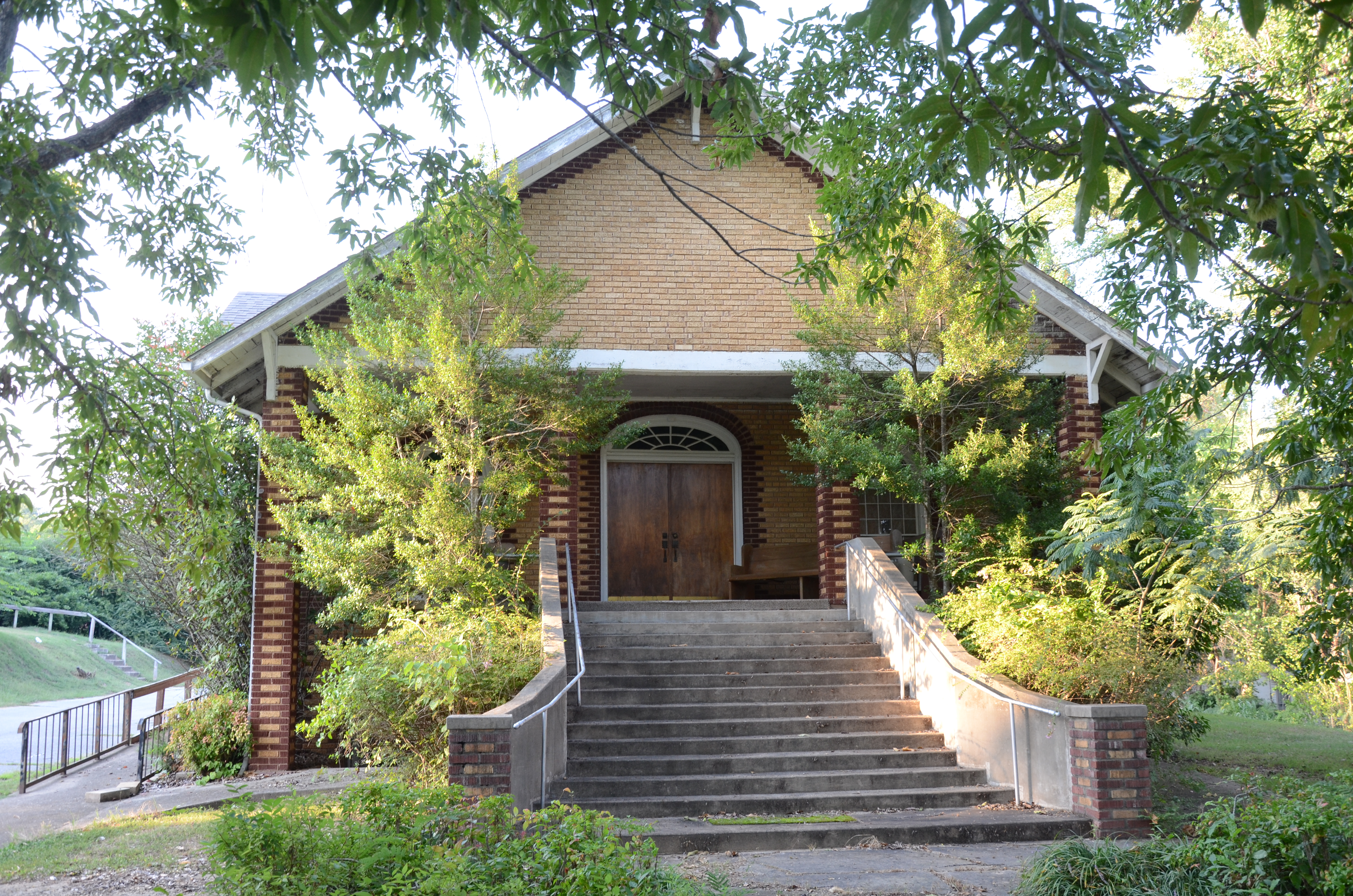

- Location within Arkansas Location within the United States
- Location: 101 W. 1st., Calico Rock, Arkansas
- Coordinates: 36°7′16″N 92°8′36″W
- Area: 0.7 acres (0.28 ha)
- Built: 1924
- Architectural style: Bungalow/craftsman, Colonial Revival
- NRHP reference No.: 07000971
- Added to NRHP: September 21, 2007

The Calico Rock Methodist Episcopal Church is a historic former church building at 101 W. 1st in Calico Rock, Arkansas, just north of the Calico Rock Historic District. It is a single-story brick structure, built in 1923–24 with Colonial Revival and Craftsman features. It has a front-gable roof with large Craftsman brackets and exposed rafters, with hip-roofed chancel and transept ends. The main entrance is sheltered by a gable-roofed porch supported by brick posts. The building served as home to a local Methodist congregation until c. 2007.

The building was listed on the National Register of Historic Places in 2007.

== See also ==
- National Register of Historic Places listings in Izard County, Arkansas
