= A. C. Jeffery Farmstead =

Historic house in Arkansas, United States

- U.S. National Register of Historic Places
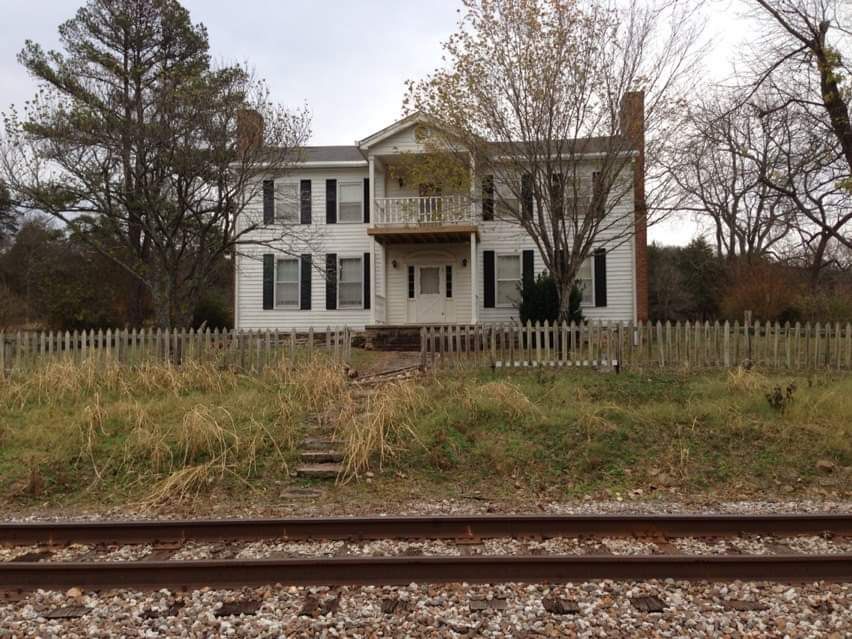

- Location within Arkansas Location within the United States
- Nearest city: Mount Olive, Izard County, Arkansas
- Coordinates: 36°0′34″N 92°5′44″W
- Area: 4 acres (1.6 ha)
- Built: c. 1848
- Architectural style: I-house
- NRHP reference No.: 94000825
- Added to NRHP: August 11, 1994

The A. C. Jeffery Farmstead is a historic farmhouse in rural Izard County, Arkansas. It is located at the northern end of County Road 18, north of the hamlet of Mount Olive.

== Description and history ==
It is a two-story wood frame I-house with a traditional central hall plan, and a kitchen ell extending to the rear (east) of the main block. The front faces west, overlooking the White River, and has a two-story porch extending across the center three bays of the five-bay facade. The interior features woodwork and hardware original to the building's c. 1848 construction. The house was built by Augustus Jeffery, the son of Jehoiada Jeffery, the first permanent white settler in north-central Arkansas, and is one of the oldest houses in the region.

The property was listed on the National Register of Historic Places on August 11, 1994.

== See also ==
- Jeffery Cemetery
- National Register of Historic Places listings in Izard County, Arkansas
