= Stuart Saunders =

Stuart Saunders may refer to:

- Stuart Saunders (academic), Vice-Chancellor of the University of Cape Town in 1981-1996
- Stuart Saunders (actor), appeared in 1960 film Dentist in the Chair
- Stuart Saunders (cricketer) (born 1960), Australian cricketer
- Stuart Saunders (rugby union) (1883–1973), played for Guy's Hospital Football Club and the British Lions tour of 1904
- Stuart T. Saunders (1909–1987), American railroad executive

== See also ==
- Stuart Saunders Hogg (1833–1921), British civil servant in India
- Stuart Saunders Smith (born 1948), American composer, percussionist and poet
