= Mount Olive Cumberland Presbyterian Church =

Historic church in Arkansas, United States

- U.S. National Register of Historic Places
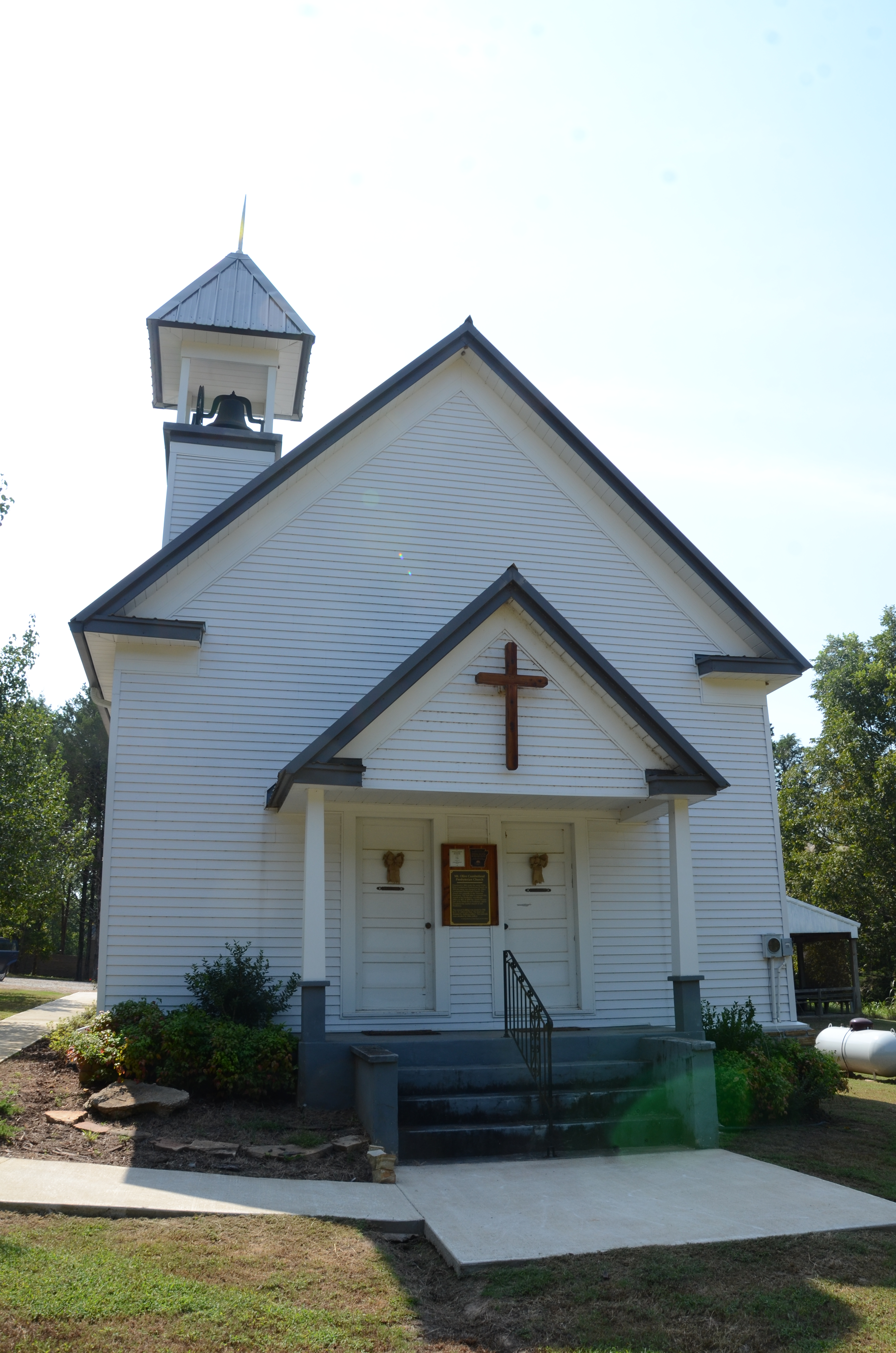

- Location within Arkansas Location within the United States
- Location: Jct. of Izard Cty Rds 12 and 18, Mount Olive, Arkansas
- Coordinates: 36°0′2″N 92°5′41″W
- Area: 1.5 acres (0.61 ha)
- Built: 1916
- Architect: E.W. Jeffery
- NRHP reference No.: 04000503
- Added to NRHP: May 26, 2004

Mount Olive Cumberland Presbyterian Church is one of the oldest existing congregations west of the Mississippi River and its historic church building at the junction of Izard County Roads 12 and 18 in Mount Olive, Arkansas is listed with the National Register of Historic Places. The pastor is Rev. Christopher S. Anderson.

The building was constructed in 1916 largely through donations from the descendants of Jehoiada and Daniel Jeffery. They had founded the church congregation in 1826 as the White River Cumberland Presbyterian Church. The Mount Olive Male and Female Academy thrived nearby. The church building was added to the National Register of Historic Places in 2004.

== See also ==
- National Register of Historic Places listings in Izard County, Arkansas
