= Endorsements in the 1928 Democratic Party presidential primaries =

This is a list of endorsements for declared candidates in the Democratic primaries for the 1928 United States presidential election.

== Alfred Smith ==
List of Alfred Smith endorsements (Pre-Convention)

U.S. Executive Branch officials

- William Wilson, U.S. Secretary of Labor (1913–1921)
- John H. Caldwell, frmr. Assistant U.S. Assistant Attorney General
- Albert Burleson, U.S. Postmaster General (1913–1921)
- Thomas Watt Gregory, U.S. Attorney General (1914–1919)

U.S. Senators

Current

- James Phelan, U.S. Senator from California (1915-1921)
- Thomas Bayard Jr., U.S. Senator from Delaware (1922-1929)
- Daniel Steck, U.S. Senator from Iowa (1926-1931)
- David Walsh, U.S. Senator from Massachusetts (1926-1947)
- William Bruce, U.S. Senator from Maryland (1923-1929)
- Edward Edwards, U.S. Senator from New Jersey (1923-1929)
- Royal Copeland, U.S. Senator from New York (1923-1938)
- Robert Wagner, U.S. Senator from New York (1927-1949)
- Edward Edwards, U.S. Senator from New Jersey (1923-1929)
- Peter Gerry, U.S. Senator from Rhode Island (1917-1929)

Former

- Oscar Underwood, U.S. Senator from Alabama (1915-1927)
- Johnson Camden Jr., U.S. Senator from Kentucky (1914-1915)

U.S. Representatives

Governors

- James Cox, Governor of Ohio (1917-1921)
- Nellie Tayloe Ross, Governor of Wyoming (1925-1927)
- Huey Long, Governor of Louisiana (1928-1932)

Statewide officials

- James Farley, Chairman of the New York State Athletic Commission
- Humphrey J. Lynch, frmr. New York State Supreme Court Justice
- Matt Sullivan, Chief Justice of California (1914-1915) (Republican)
- George Lunn, Lieutenant Governor of New York (1923-1924)
- Charles Cole, Adjutant General of Massachusetts (1914-1916)

State legislators

- Martin McCue, New York State Senator (1921)

Local officials

- Jimmy Walker, Mayor of New York City (1926-1932)
- James Curley, Mayor of Boston, Massachusetts (1922-1926)
- Andrew Peters, Mayor of Boston, Massachusetts (1918-1922)
- W.A. Gunter, Jr., Mayor of Montgomery, Alabama (1919-1940)

Party officials

- J. Bruce Kremer, Democratic National Committeeman (D-MT)
- Joseph Guffey, Democratic National Committeeman (D-PA)
- Isidore Dockweiler, Democratic National Committeeman (D-CA)
- Mrs. John R. Eskridge, Democratic National Committeeman (D-DE)
- John F. Costello, Democratic National Committeeman (D-DC)
- Florence Harriman, Democratic National Committeewoman (D-DC)
- Teresa M. Graham, Democratic National Committeewoman (D-ID)
- D. J. McGillicuddy, Democratic National Committeeman (D-ME)
- Edward Quinn, Democratic National Committeeman (D-MA)
- William Comstock, Democratic National Committeeman (D-MI)
- Etta C. Boltwood, Democratic National Committeewoman (D-MI)
- Joseph Wolf, Democratic National Committeeman (D-MN)
- Jessie E. Scott, Democratic National Committeewoman (D-MN)
- Norman Mack, Democratic National Committeeman (D-NY)
- Elisabeth Marbury, Democratic National Committeewoman (D-NY)
- R. B. Murphy, Democratic National Committeeman (D-ND)
- Will R. King, Democratic National Committeeman (D-OR)
- Patrick H. Quinn, Democratic National Committeeman (D-RI)
- Frank Duffy, Democratic National Committeeman (D-VT)
- George F. Christensen, Democratic National Committeeman (D-WA)
- Elizabeth D. Christian, Democratic National Committeewoman (D-WA)
- C. W. Osenton, Democratic National Committeeman (D-WV)
- John Callahan, Democratic National Committeeman (D-WI)
- Gertrude Bowler, Democratic National Committeewoman (D-WI)
- Patrick J. Quealy, Democratic National Committeeman (D-WY)
- Wilbur Marsh, Democratic National Committee Treasurer (D-IA)
- Park Pollard, Chairman of the Democratic Party of Vermont

Individuals

- George Olvany, Grand Sachem of Tammany Hall (1924-1929)
- Fred Johnson
- Robert Ewing, publisher
- Edward House, diplomat, adviser to President Woodrow Wilson
- Gertrude Atherton, author
- Eleanor Roosevelt, activist
- Harold Schoenecker, lawyer and businessman
- Caroline O'Day, activist
- Sybil McCaslin Bowers, activist
- Angela Delagi, activist
- Florence Whitney, activist
- Rosalie Solomons Philips, politician
- Gertrude Ely, philanthropist
- Roger Baldwin, Executive Director of the American Civil Liberties Union (1917-1950)

Newspapers

Organizations

Ambassadors

- Roland Morris, ambassador to Japan (1917-1920)
- Henry Morgenthau Sr., ambassador to Turkey (1913-1916)
- Robert Jeffery, ambassador to Uruguay (1915-1921)

== James Reed ==
List of James Reed endorsements (Pre-Convention)

U.S. Executive Branch officials

U.S. Senators

Current

- Henry Ashurst, U.S. Senator from Arizona (1912-1941)
- Harry Hawes, U.S. Senator from Missouri (1926-1933)

Former

- Xenophon Wilfley, U.S. Senator from Missouri (1918)
- Joseph Weldon Bailey, U.S. Senator from Texas (1901-1913)

U.S. Representatives

Governors

- Jonathan Davis, Governor of Kansas (1923-1925)
- Frederick Gardner, Governor of Missouri (1917-1921)
- Oswald West, Governor of Oregon (1911-1915)

Statewide officials

State legislators

Local officials

Party officials

Individuals

- Samuel Fordyce Jr., businessman
- Ed Villmoare, businessman
- Lee Meriwether, author and government official

Newspapers

Organizations

== Walter George ==
List of Walter George endorsements (Pre-Convention)

U.S. Executive Branch officials

U.S. Senators

- William Harris, U.S. Senator from Georgia (1919-1932)
- Furnifold Simmons, U.S. Senator from North Carolina (1901-1940)

U.S. Representatives

- Charles Gordon Edwards, U.S. Representative from GA-1 (1925-1931)
- Edward Cox, U.S. Representative from GA-2 (1925-1952)
- Charles Crisp, U.S. Representative from GA-3 (1913-1932)
- William Wright, U.S. Representative from GA-4 (1918-1933)
- Leslie Jasper Steele, U.S. Representative from GA-5 (1927-1929)
- Samuel Rutherford, U.S. Representative from GA-6 (1925-1932)
- Malcolm Tarver, U.S. Representative from GA-7 (1927-1947)
- Charles Hillyer Brand, U.S. Representative from GA-8 (1917-1933)
- Thomas Montgomery Bell, U.S. Representative from GA-9 (1905-1931)
- Carl Vinson, U.S. Representative from GA-10 (1914-1965)
- William Chester Lankford, U.S. Representative from GA-11 (1919-1933)
- William Washington Larsen, U.S. Representative from GA-12 (1917-1933)

Governors

Statewide officials

State legislators

Local officials

- Clark Howell, State Senator from Georgia

Party officials

- John Cohen, Democratic National Committeeman (D-GA)

Individuals

- George F. Milton, editor of The Chattanooga News
- Mary Harris Armor, temperance leader

Newspapers

Organizations

== Thomas Walsh ==
List of Thomas Walsh endorsements (Before May 5, 1928)

U.S. Executive Branch officials

- William McAdoo, U.S. Secretary of the Treasury (1913–1918)
- Josephus Daniels, U.S. Secretary of the Navy (1913–1921)

U.S. Senators

- Woodbridge Ferris, U.S. Senator from Michigan (1923-1928)
- Burton Wheeler, U.S. Senator from Montana (1923-1947)
- Henry Myers, U.S. Senator from Montana (1911-1923)

U.S. Representatives

- Tom Stout, U.S. Representative from MT-AL Seat B (1913-1917)

Governors

- Sam Stewart, Governor of Montana (1913-1921)

Statewide officials

State legislators

- Claude F. Morris, State Senator from Montana (1916-1920)
- James O'Connor, State Representative from Montana (1917-1918)

Local officials

Party officials

- James Moyle, Democratic National Committeeman (D-UT)

Individuals

- George F. Milton, publisher
- Ella Boole, temperance leader and social reformer
- Kathleen Norris, novelist and newspaper columnist
- George Creel, investigative journalist, writer and government official

Newspapers

Organizations

== Albert Ritchie ==
List of Albert Ritchie endorsements (Before June 18, 1928)

U.S. Executive Branch officials

U.S. Senators

U.S. Representatives

Governors

Statewide officials

State legislators

Local officials

Party officials

Individuals

- Michael Joseph Curley, Archbishop of the Archdiocese of Washington

Newspapers

Organizations

== Evans Woolen ==
List of Evans Woolen endorsements (Pre-Convention)

U.S. Executive Branch officials

U.S. Senators

U.S. Representatives

Governors

Statewide officials

State legislators

Local officials

Party officials

- Charles A. Greathouse, Democratic National Committeeman (D-IN)

Individuals

Newspapers

Organizations
