= National Register of Historic Places listings in Izard County, Arkansas =

Location of Izard County in Arkansas

This is a list of the National Register of Historic Places listings in Izard County, Arkansas.

This is intended to be a complete list of the properties and districts on the National Register of Historic Places in Izard County, Arkansas, United States. The locations of National Register properties and districts for which the latitude and longitude coordinates are included below, may be seen in a map.

There are 18 properties and districts listed on the National Register in the county.

Contents: Counties in Arkansas
- Arkansas
- Ashley
- Baxter
- Benton
- Boone
- Bradley
- Calhoun
- Carroll
- Chicot
- Clark
- Clay
- Cleburne
- Cleveland
- Columbia
- Conway
- Craighead
- Crawford
- Crittenden
- Cross
- Dallas
- Desha
- Drew
- Faulkner
- Franklin
- Fulton
- Garland
- Grant
- Greene
- Hempstead
- Hot Spring
- Howard
- Independence
- Izard
- Jackson
- Jefferson
- Johnson
- Lafayette
- Lawrence
- Lee
- Lincoln
- Little River
- Logan
- Lonoke
- Madison
- Marion
- Miller
- Mississippi
- Monroe
- Montgomery
- Nevada
- Newton
- Ouachita
- Perry
- Phillips
- Pike
- Poinsett
- Polk
- Pope
- Prairie
- Pulaski (Little Rock)
- Randolph
- St. Francis
- Saline
- Scott
- Searcy
- Sebastian
- Sevier
- Sharp
- Stone
- Union
- Van Buren
- Washington
- White
- Woodruff
- Yell

This National Park Service list is complete through NPS recent listings posted October 9, 2026.

== Current listings ==
	Name on the Register	Image	Date listed	Location	City or town	Description
1	Arnold Springs Farmstead	Arnold Springs Farmstead	May 28, 2010 (#10000285)	North end of Jennings Lane; 36°03′48″N 91°53′21″W	Melbourne	
2	Boswell School	Boswell School	September 18, 1992 (#92001178)	End of County Road 196; 36°02′25″N 92°03′18″W	Boswell	
3	Calico Rock Historic District	Calico Rock Historic District	November 19, 1985 (#85003499)	Roughly bounded by Main, Rodman, and Walnut Sts., and Peppersauce Alley; also the western side of Rodman St. at the Missouri Pacific railroad tracks 36°07′01″N 92°08′33″W	Calico Rock	Second set of boundaries represents a boundary increase of October 26, 1989
4	Calico Rock Home Economics Building	Calico Rock Home Economics Building	September 10, 1992 (#92001200)	2nd St. 36°07′01″N 92°08′02″W	Calico Rock	
5	Calico Rock Methodist Episcopal Church	Calico Rock Methodist Episcopal Church	September 21, 2007 (#07000971)	101 W. 1st. 36°07′16″N 92°08′36″W	Calico Rock	
6	Caney Springs Cumberland Presbyterian Church	Caney Springs Cumberland Presbyterian Church	June 9, 1995 (#95000693)	Northwest of the junction of Highway 289 and County Road 70; 36°03′40″N 91°49′09″W	Sage	
7	Izard County Courthouse	Izard County Courthouse	September 30, 1993 (#93001025)	Highway 69 on Courthouse Square; 36°03′31″N 91°54′20″W	Melbourne	
8	Izard County First Court House Marker	Izard County First Court House Marker	September 28, 2026 (#100013437)	80 East Main Street; 36°03′32″N 91°54′21″W	Melbourne	
9	Jeffery Cemetery	Jeffery Cemetery	November 5, 1999 (#99001261)	Approximately 6 miles west of Highway 9, 1 mile north of the Mount Olive access road 36°01′09″N 92°05′16″W	Mount Olive	
10	A.C. Jeffery Farmstead	A.C. Jeffery Farmstead	August 11, 1994 (#94000825)	County Road 18 north of Mt. Olive; 36°00′34″N 92°05′44″W	Mount Olive	
11	Jumbo Church of Christ	Jumbo Church of Christ	February 18, 1999 (#99000222)	Approximately 4 miles northwest of the junction of Sylamore and Jumbo Rds. 36°03′34″N 91°58′39″W	Melbourne	
12	Missouri Pacific Railroad Depot		December 1, 2004 (#04001036)	Old Highway 9; 35°56′53″N 92°06′24″W	Sylamore	
13	Mount Olive Cumberland Presbyterian Church	Mount Olive Cumberland Presbyterian Church	May 26, 2004 (#04000503)	Junction of County Roads 12 and 18; 36°00′02″N 92°05′41″W	Mount Olive	
14	Philadelphia Methodist Church	Philadelphia Methodist Church	September 29, 1976 (#76000420)	North of Melbourne; 36°06′39″N 91°52′00″W	Melbourne	
15	Pine Ridge School Building	Pine Ridge School Building	March 7, 1994 (#94000161)	County Road 237 west of Brockwell; 36°08′44″N 91°56′05″W	Brockwell	
16	Rector Log Barn	Rector Log Barn	June 3, 1993 (#93000488)	County Road 218, 1.23 miles northwest of its junction with Highway 9; 36°05′34″N 91°56′08″W	Melbourne	
17	Sylvester Smith Farmstead	Sylvester Smith Farmstead	September 8, 1992 (#92001222)	South of County Road 10, approximately ¾ mile northeast of its junction with County Road 13; 36°02′31″N 92°02′39″W	Boswell	
18	Vest Cemetery	Vest Cemetery	January 8, 2016 (#15000284)	335 Vest Cemetery Rd. 36°02′42″N 92°03′12″W	Boswell	

=== Former listings ===
	Name on the Register	Image	Date listed	Date removed	Location	City or town	Description
1	Melbourne Home Economics Building		September 10, 1992 (#92001201)	March 31, 2000	School Drive; 36°03′42″N 91°54′34″W	Melbourne	

== See also ==
- List of National Historic Landmarks in Arkansas
- National Register of Historic Places listings in Arkansas
