= 1983–84 Sheffield Shield season =

Australian cricket tournament

- Cricket format: First-class
- Tournament format(s): Double round-robin & Final
- Champions: Western Australia (9th title)
- Participants: 6
- Matches: 31
- Player of the series: John Dyson (New South Wales) & Brian Davison (Tasmania)
- Most runs: John Dyson (New South Wales) (1066)
- Most wickets: Jeff Thomson (Queensland) (47)

The 1983–84 Sheffield Shield season was the 82nd season of the Sheffield Shield, the domestic first-class cricket competition of Australia. Western Australia won the championship.

== Points table ==
Team	Pld	W	WLF	L	LWF	DWF	DLF	ND	Pts
Western Australia	10	2	2	0	0	5	1	0	76
Queensland	10	3	1	0	2	1	2	1	74
Tasmania	10	1	1	2	1	3	2	0	44
New South Wales	10	1	0	2	2	3	2	0	36
South Australia	10	0	1	1	1	2	4	1	26
Victoria	10	0	1	2	0	2	5	0	20

== Final ==
9–13 March 1984
Scorecard

Queensland	v	Western Australia (H)
431/7d (169 overs); Greg Chappell 85; Shaun Graf 3/111 (42 overs)		363 (130.2 overs); Geoff Marsh 107; Jeff Thomson 5/85 (25.2 overs)
154 (60.2 overs); Chris Smart 62; Ken MacLeay 4/58 (21 overs)		224/6 (70.5 overs); Bruce Laird 54*; Graham Whyte 3/28 (13 overs)

Western Australia win by 4 wickets
WACA Ground, Perth
Umpires: Mel Johnson and Peter McConnell

== Statistics ==
=== Most Runs ===
John Dyson 1066

=== Most Wickets ===
Jeff Thomson 47
