= Boswell School =

- U.S. National Register of Historic Places
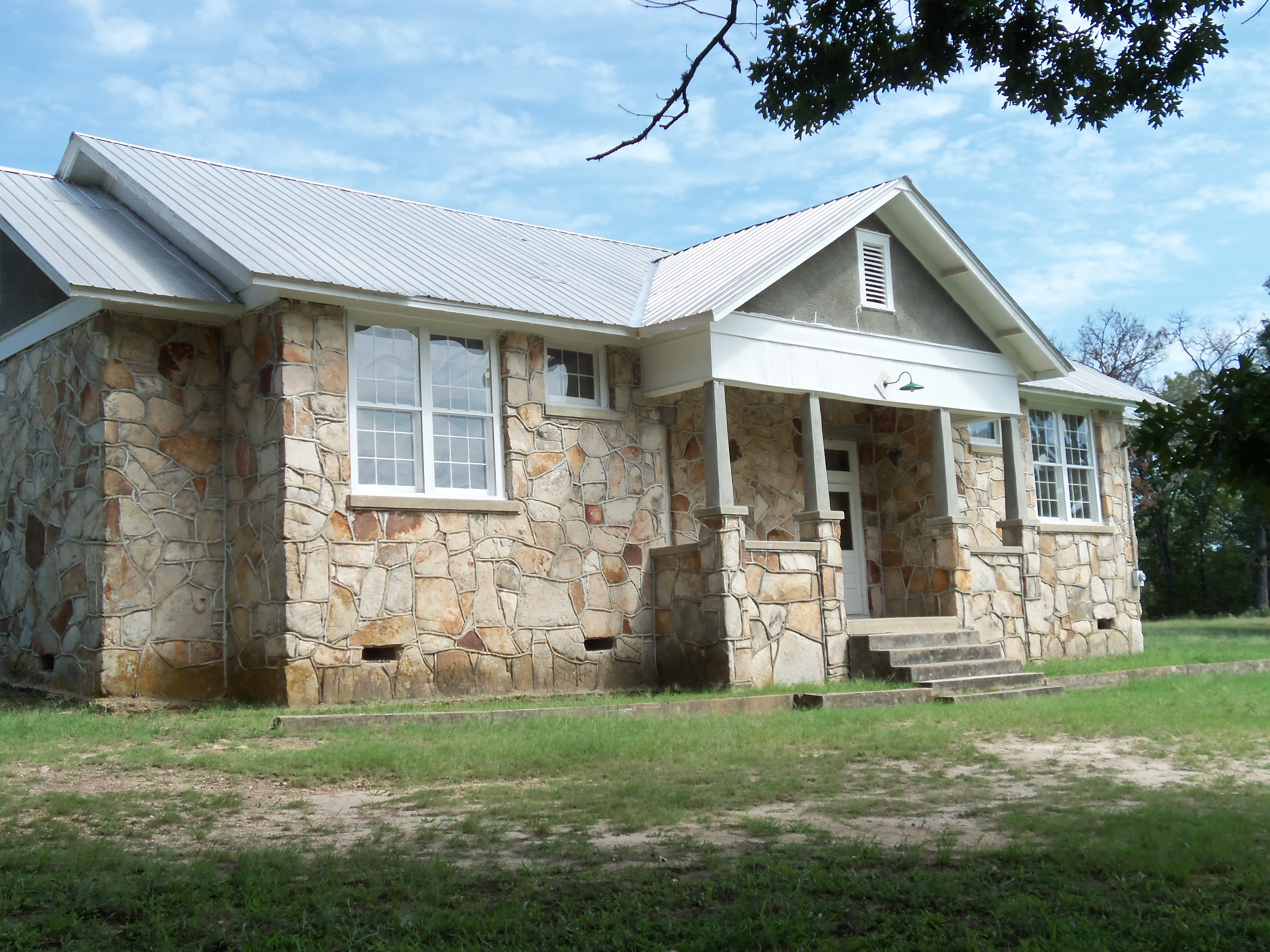

- Location within Arkansas Location within the United States
- Location: End of Co. Rd. 196, Boswell, Arkansas
- Coordinates: 36°2′25″N 92°3′18″W
- Area: less than one acre
- Built: 1934
- Built by: Works Progress Administration
- Architectural style: Late 19th And Early 20th Century American Movements, Plain Traditional
- MPS: Public Schools in the Ozarks MPS
- NRHP reference No.: 92001178
- Added to NRHP: September 18, 1992

The Boswell School, now the Boswell Baptist Church, is a historic school building in rural western Izard County, Arkansas. It is located in the hamlet of Boswell, at the end of County Road 196. It is a single-story fieldstone structure, with a side gable roof and a projecting front-gable entry porch. The school was built in 1934 with funding from the Works Progress Administration, and was used as a local public school until 1950, when the local school district was consolidated with that of Calico Rock. The building was then converted to a church.

The building was listed on the National Register of Historic Places in 1992.

== See also ==
- National Register of Historic Places listings in Izard County, Arkansas
