= Rector Log Barn =

- U.S. National Register of Historic Places
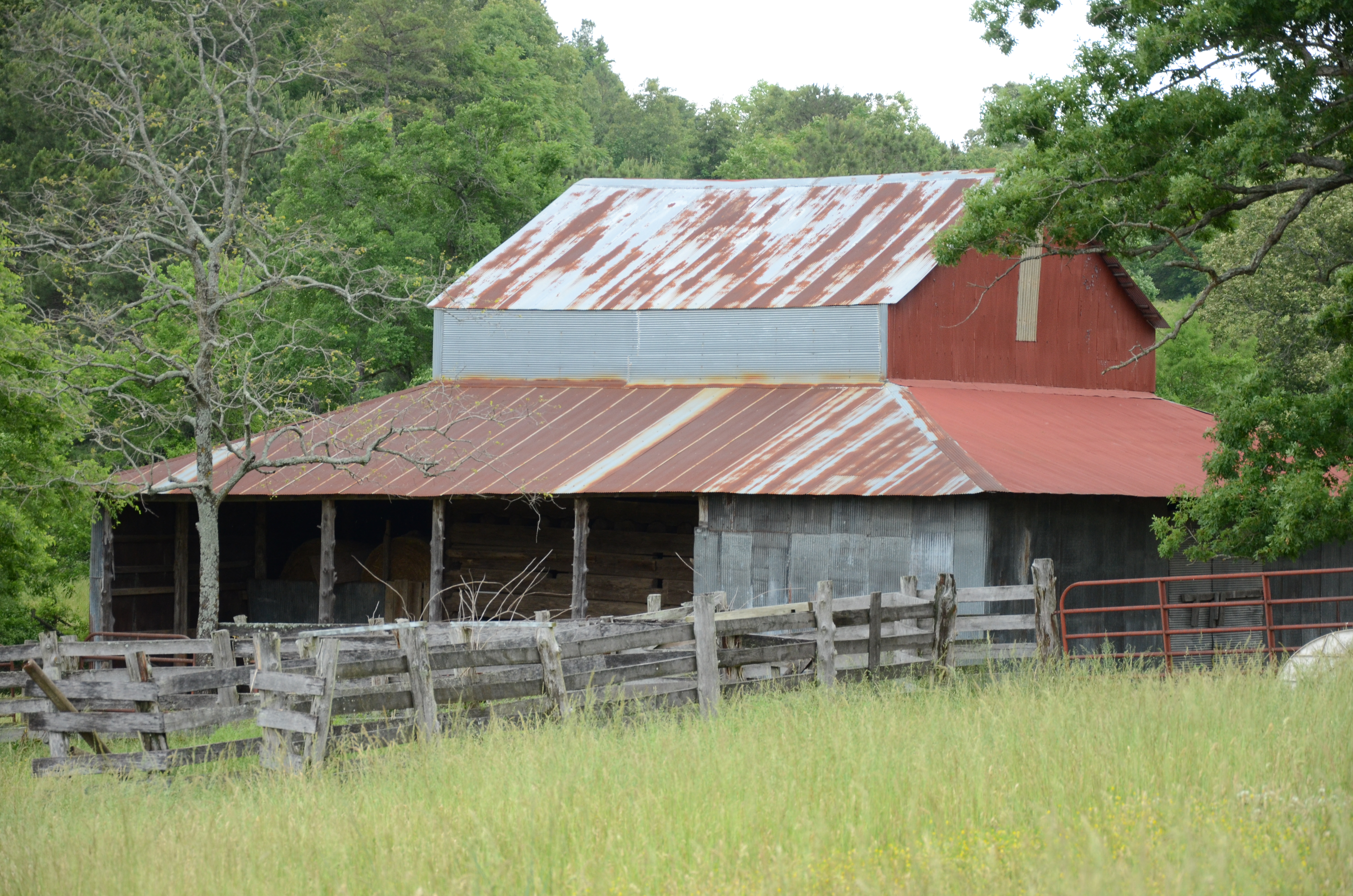

- Location within Arkansas Location within the United States
- Nearest city: Melbourne, Arkansas
- Coordinates: 36°5′34″N 91°56′8″W
- Area: less than one acre
- Built: 1855
- Built by: Joseph William Rector
- Architectural style: Vernacular, Plain Traditional
- NRHP reference No.: 93000488
- Added to NRHP: June 3, 1993

The Rector Log Barn is a historic barn in rural Izard County, Arkansas. It is located on the Rector Plantation, at the end of County Road 218, northwest of Melbourne. Its central portion, a log structure 2 1/2 stories in height, was built c. 1855, and is the only known example in the region of an antebellum era log barn. The main structure is flanked on all sides by 20th-century single-story shed-roof extensions, which serve in part to protect the historic log elements. The barn was built by Joseph William Rector, an early settler of Izard County, probably with the use of slave labor.

The barn was listed on the National Register of Historic Places in 1993.

== See also ==
- National Register of Historic Places listings in Izard County, Arkansas
