= Vest Cemetery =

United States historic place

- U.S. National Register of Historic Places
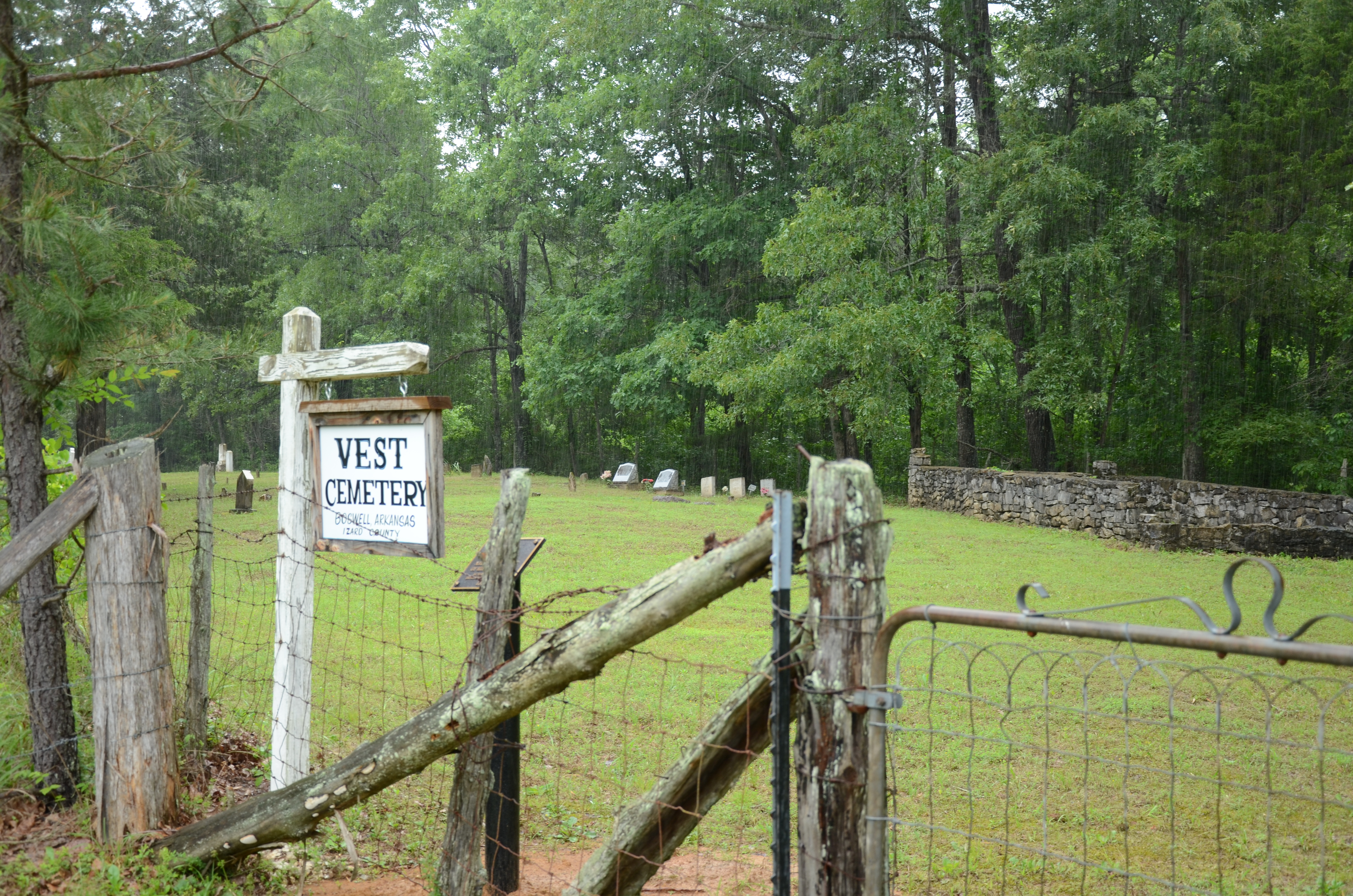

- Location within Arkansas Location within the United States
- Location: End of County Road 179 (Vest Cemetery Rd.), Boswell, Arkansas
- Coordinates: 36°2′42″N 92°3′12″W
- Area: less than one acre
- Built: 1875
- NRHP reference No.: 15000284
- Added to NRHP: January 8, 2016

The Vest Cemetery is a historic cemetery in rural western Izard County, Arkansas. It is located at the end of Vest Cemetery Road (County Road 197), north of the hamlet of Boswell, adjacent to the site of the former Vest family homestead. It is a rectangular parcel, with 72 known graves dating back to the early settlement period of Boswell in the 1870s. A portion of the cemetery is lined by a low rock wall, built to keep cattle from grazing on the family graves of the Cockersham family. The entire cemetery is now lined by woven wire fencing.

The cemetery was listed on the National Register of Historic Places in 2016.

== See also ==
- National Register of Historic Places listings in Izard County, Arkansas
