= Shaun Graf =

Australian cricketer (born 1957)

Personal information
- Full name: Shaun Francis Graf
- Born: 19 May 1957 (age 69); Somerville, Victoria, Australia
- Batting: Right-handed
- Bowling: Right-arm fast-medium

International information
- National side: Australia
- ODI debut (cap 62): 23 November 1980 v New Zealand
- Last ODI: 24 November 1981 v West Indies

Domestic team information
- Years: Team
- 1979: Wiltshire
- 1979/80–1982/83: Victoria
- 1980: Hampshire
- 1983: Cornwall
- 1983/84: Western Australia
- 1984/85: Victoria

Career statistics
Competition	ODI	FC	LA
Matches	11	55	41
Runs scored	24	1,559	300
Batting average	4.00	25.14	15.00
100s/50s	0/0	1/8	0/0
Top score	8	100*	37*
Balls bowled	522	9,220	2,033
Wickets	8	124	51
Bowling average	43.12	33.91	25.58
5 wickets in innings	0	1	0
10 wickets in match	0	0	0
Best bowling	2/23	5/95	4/15
Catches/stumpings	1/–	30/–	7/–
- Source: Cricinfo, 26 February 2013

Shaun Francis Graf (born 19 May 1957) is an Australian former international cricketer who played eleven One Day Internationals (ODIs) for Australia in the early 1980s as a bowling all-rounder. He played his domestic cricket at first-class level predominantly for Victoria, but also spent a season with Western Australia. Graf also played domestically in England, at first-class level for Hampshire and at minor counties level for Wiltshire and Cornwall. He later became a prominent administrator with Cricket Victoria.

== Cricket career ==
=== Early life and career ===
Shaun Francis Graf was born on 19 May 1957 in Somerville, Victoria. He was educated at St Bede's College in the Melbourne suburb of Mentone. He made his grade debut at the age of 19 for St Kilda Cricket Club as a fast bowling all-rounder in the 1976–77 season. In 1979, he played minor counties cricket in England for Wiltshire, making five appearances in the Minor Counties Championship. Alongside minor counties cricket, he spent time in Bristol playing club cricket for Knowle. Returning to Australia after his minor counties stint, Graf made his debut in first-class cricket for Victoria against New South Wales at the Sydney Cricket Ground in the 1979–80 Sheffield Shield, with him playing a further five Shield matches that season. He scored 135 runs in his debut first-class season, in addition to taking 17 wickets with his right-arm fast-medium bowling at an average of 27.88. In the same season, he debuted in List A one-day cricket, making four appearances in the McDonald's Cup, the forerunner of the modern-day Dean Jones Trophy; he played in the final at the Melbourne Cricket Ground (MCG), taking 2 for 34 to help Victoria win the match.

In December 1979, he joined Hampshire ahead of the 1980 season. He made his debut for the county in a 1980 County Championship fixture against Warwickshire at Southampton. Graf made 15 first-class appearances in 1980, including against the touring Australians. In these, he scored 284 runs at a batting average of 20.28, in addition to taking 20 wickets at an average of 44.45. He made 12 appearances in one-day cricket, taking 17 wickets at an average of 18.23.

=== International call-up ===
Graf's first-class form was better in the Australian 1980–81 season. In his first Sheffield Shield game of the season, against Western Australia, he scored 34 and 64 and took four wickets. Later in the season, he scored his maiden first-class century against the same opponents at the MCG. Across the season, he made eight first-class appearances, scoring 286 runs at an average of 40.85; with the ball he took 20 wickets at an average of 30.30. His Shield form led to Graf being selected in the Australia squad for the second Test match of their home series against New Zealand, at a time when the Australian selectors were seeking an all-rounder. Commenting on Australia lacking a true all-rounder, their captain Greg Chappell said at the time: "Shaun Graf is an up-and-comer in this area and he is possibly what Australia needs – not only in one day cricket but in Test matches as well". He did not end up playing in the Test series, with a back injury ruling him out, and Trevor Chappell replacing him in the side for the third Test. He did make his One Day International (ODI) debut against New Zealand at the Adelaide Oval in the first match of the Australia Tri-Nation Series which followed. He played in nine ODI matches during the series, that also included India, with Graf taking eight wickets at an average of 31.87; he was omitted from the four-match final against New Zealand. Alongside the ODI series, Australia played India in a Test series, with Graf replacing Trevor Chappell in the squad for the first Test, but he did not play. He was replaced in the second Test by Bruce Yardley.

The following season, he made two further ODI appearances in the second and third matches of the Tri-Nation Series against Pakistan and the West Indies, having been called up to replace the injured Dennis Lillee. During the 1981–82 domestic season, Graf made eight first-class appearances scoring 230 runs at an average of 19.16, while with the ball he took 17 wickets at an average of 39.47. In one-day cricket, he made three appearances in the McDonald's Cup. The following season, he made six first-class appearances, scoring 155 runs at an average of 19.16, and with the ball he took 14 wickets at an average of 30.50; playing against Western Australia at the WACA, he took the only five-wicket haul of his first-class career with figures of 5 for 95 in the Western Australia second innings, having taken 4 for 53 in their first innings. He also played three one-day matches during the season. Graf returned to England for the 1983 season, playing minor counties cricket for Cornwall. He made eight appearances in the Minor Counties Championship, and returned to Bristol to play for Knowle when he wasn't required by Cornwall.

=== Move to Western Australia ===
Graf moved to Western Australia for the 1983–84 season, being selected to play in the Sheffield Shield match against Victoria as a replacement for injured batsman Wayne Andrews. In his only season with Western Australia, in which they won their ninth Sheffield Shield, he made 11 first-class appearances, scoring 420 runs at an average of 35. With the ball, he took 32 wickets at an average of 32.75. He also made four one-day appearances in the McDonald's Cup, with Graf playing against South Australia in the final of the competition at the Adelaide Oval. He came close to guiding Western Australia to victory, with a late unbeaten cameo of 37 runs from 33 balls, but Western Australia ultimately fell eight runs short. He returned to Victoria the following season, making one appearance in the Sheffield Shield against Queensland.

== Playing style and statistics ==
Described as an athletic all-rounder by the cricket journalist Christopher Martin-Jenkins, Graf made 55 first-class appearances, scoring 1,559 runs at an average of 25.14; described by Martin-Jenkins as possessing a wristy action and able to consistently bowl away-swinging deliveries, he took 124 first-class wickets at an average of 33.91. In one-day cricket, he made 41 appearances, scoring 300 runs at an average of exactly 15, whilst with the ball he took 51 wickets at an average of 25.58.

== Later life ==
After retiring, Graf continued to play Grade Cricket for St Kilda until 1999, making 243 appearances for the club across 24 seasons, scoring 4,200 runs and taking 382 wickets. He became a selector for the Victoria cricket team during the 1990–91 season, and became the cricket operations manager of the Victorian Cricket Association (later Cricket Victoria) in 1995. He retired from his role with Cricket Victoria in July 2022.

== Works cited ==
- Martin-Jenkins (1996). World Cricketers: A Biographical Dictionary. Oxford University Press. ISBN 978-0-1921-0005-4 – via Internet Archive.
