= Arnold Springs Farmstead =

Historic house in Arkansas, United States

- U.S. National Register of Historic Places
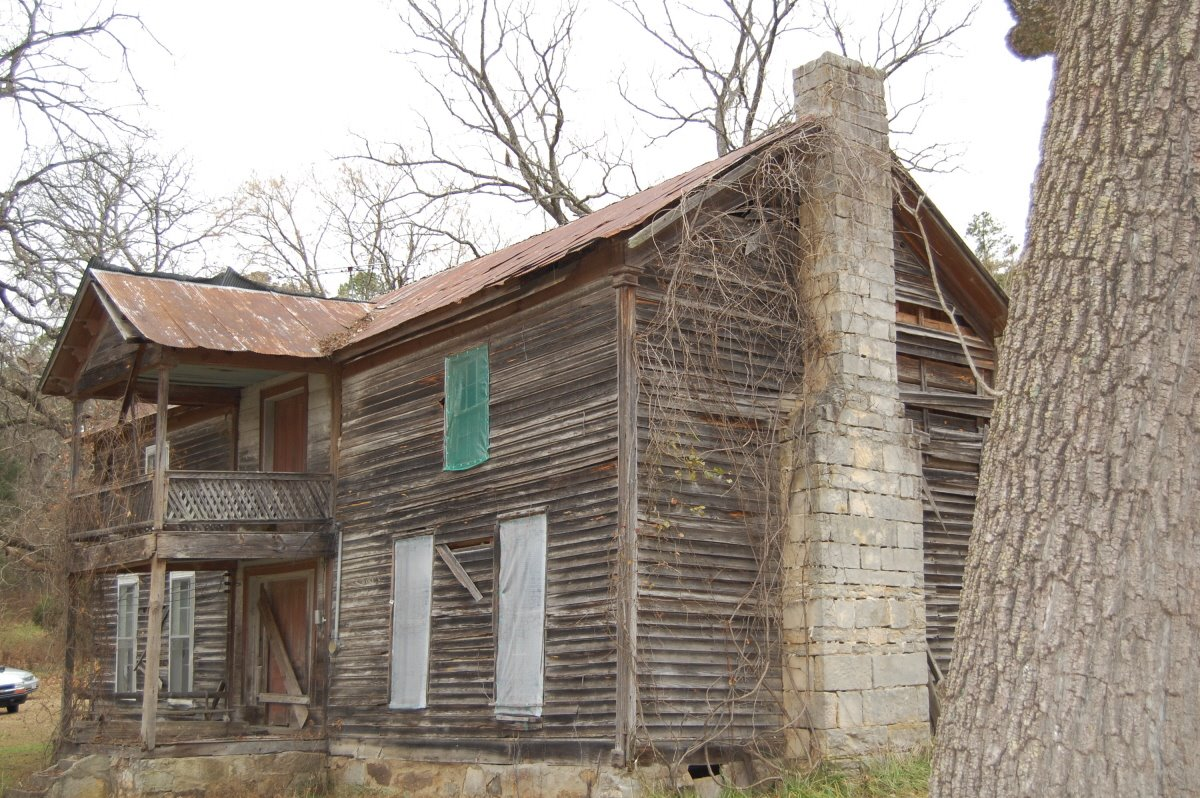

- Location within Arkansas Location within the United States
- Location: N end of Jennings Ln, Melbourne, Arkansas
- Coordinates: 36°3′55″N 91°53′20″W
- Area: 5 acres (2.0 ha)
- Built: 1857
- Architectural style: Mid 19th Century Revival, Greek Revival
- NRHP reference No.: 10000285
- Added to NRHP: May 28, 2010

The Arnold Springs Farmstead is a historic farmstead on Jennings Lane on the northwest edge of Melbourne, Arkansas. The farmhouse on the 5-acre (2.0 ha) property is a log structure clad in weatherboard whose construction has been dated to the mid-1850s. It was originally built as a dogtrot, which was enclosed in the late 19th century. The exterior of the house has vernacular Greek Revival styling, also applied in the late 19th century. The property also includes a collection of 19th- and early 20th-century agricultural outbuildings, as well as an early stone wall and bridge. Sited near a locally significant fresh-water spring, the site served as a tavern and traveler's rest stop for many years.

The property was listed on the National Register of Historic Places in 2010.

== See also ==
- National Register of Historic Places listings in Izard County, Arkansas
