= Philadelphia Methodist Church =

Historic church in Arkansas, United States

- U.S. National Register of Historic Places
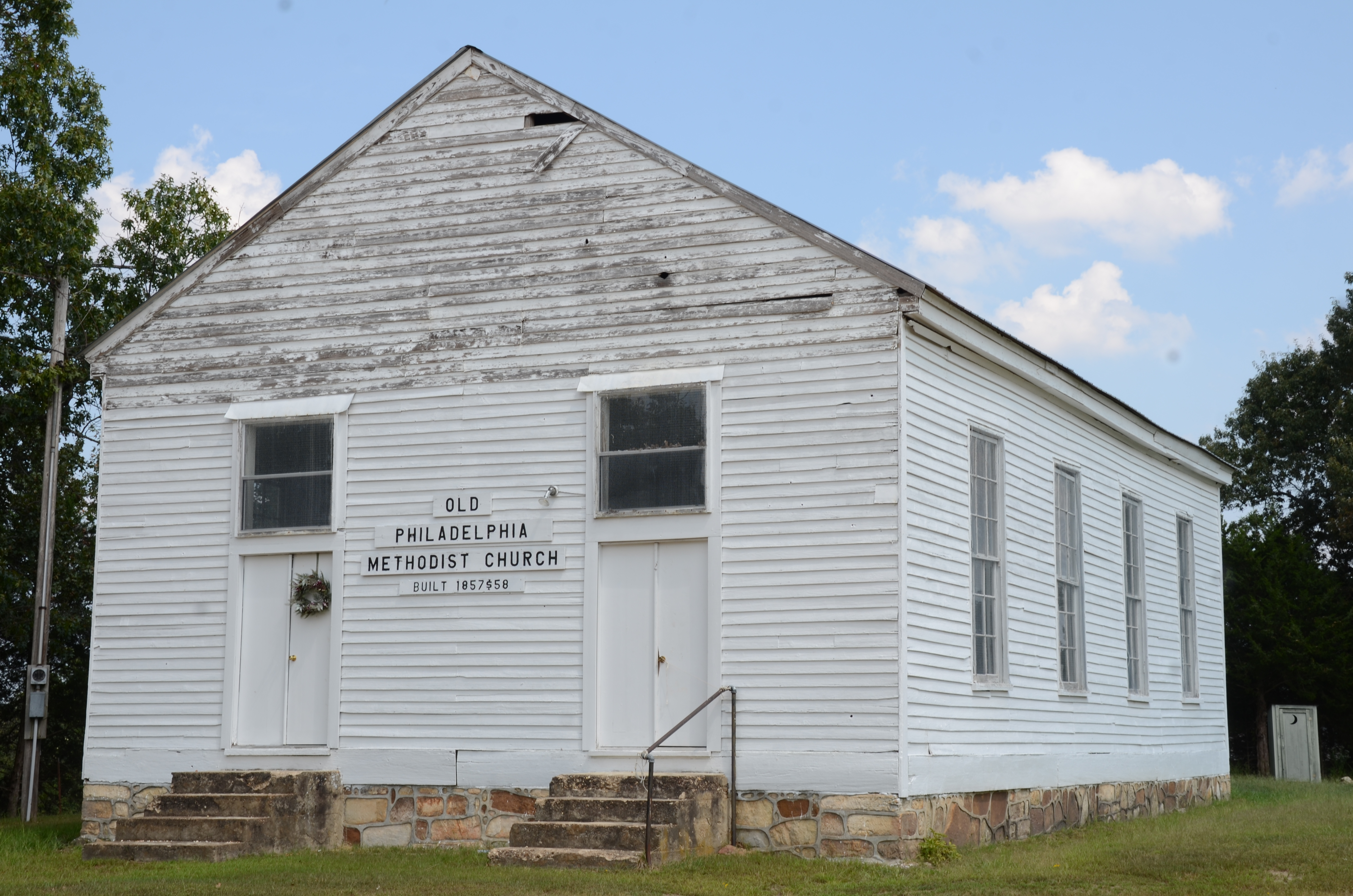

- Location within Arkansas Location within the United States
- Nearest city: Melbourne, Arkansas
- Coordinates: 36°6′39″N 91°52′0″W
- Area: less than one acre
- Built: 1858
- Architect: Wicks, Samuel L.
- NRHP reference No.: 76000420
- Added to NRHP: September 29, 1976

The Philadelphia Methodist Church is a historic church in rural central Izard County, Arkansas, USA. It is located on County Road 15, northeast of Melbourne near the small community of Larkin, which was originally known as Philadelphia. It is a simple wood-frame structure with a gable roof, and rests on a stone foundation. Built in 1858, it is believed to be the oldest church in the county, and one of the few antebellum era churches left in the state.

The church was listed on the National Register of Historic Places in 1976.

== See also ==
- National Register of Historic Places listings in Izard County, Arkansas
