= Jeffery Cemetery =

Historic site in Izard County, Arkansas, US

- U.S. National Register of Historic Places
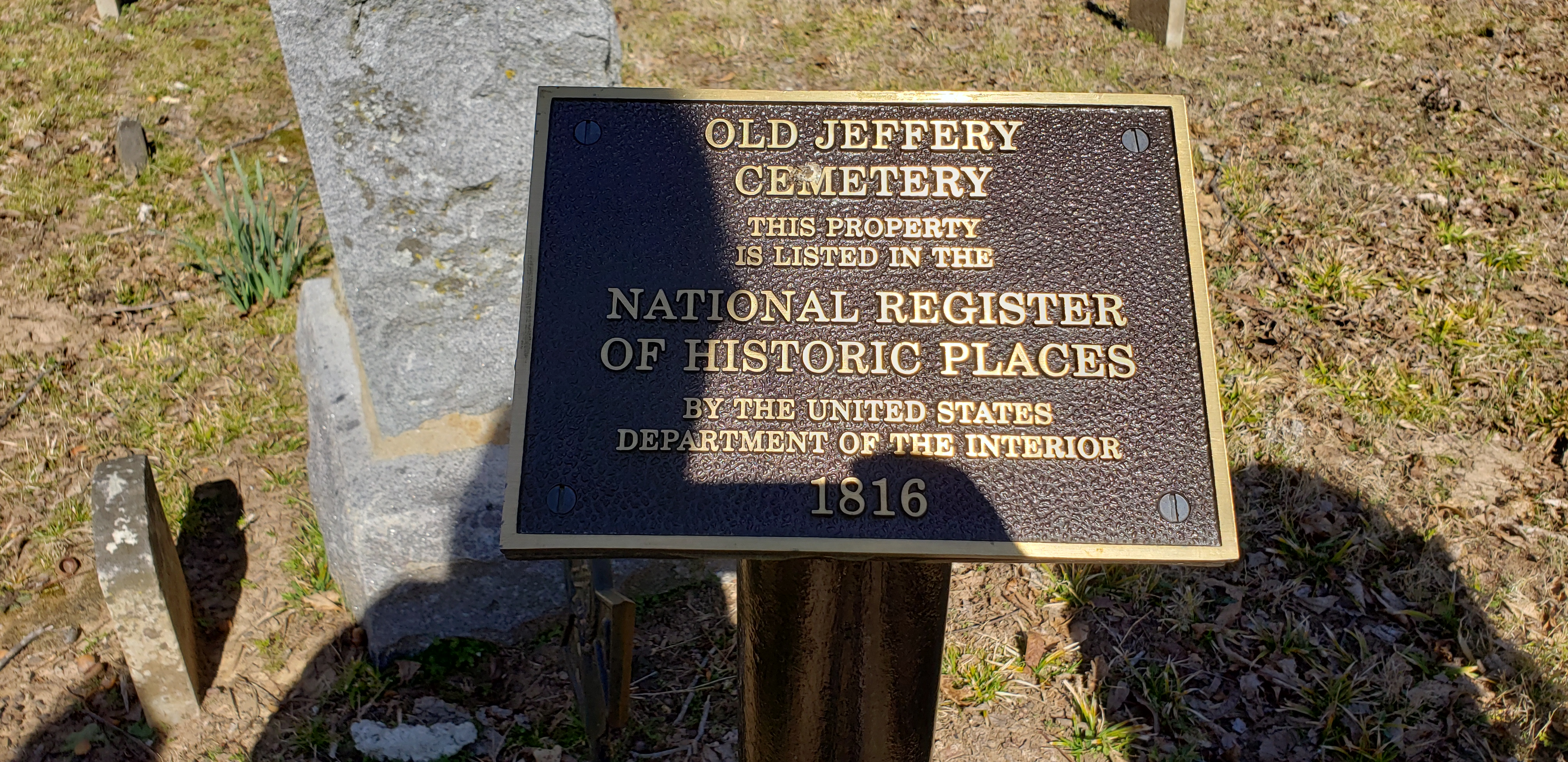
- National Register of Historic Places plaque in the cemetery

- Location within Arkansas Location within the United States
- Nearest city: Mount Olive, Arkansas
- Coordinates: 36°1′9″N 92°5′16″W
- Area: less than one acre
- Built: 1846
- NRHP reference No.: 99001261
- Added to NRHP: November 5, 1999

The Jeffery Cemetery is a historic cemetery in rural western Izard County, Arkansas. It is located on a knoll overlooking the White River, about 1 mile (1.6 km) north of Mount Olive, and is less than one acre in size. It has sixteen marked burial sites, and another ten to twenty that have no marking. The earliest dated burial occurred in 1816, and the latest in 1908. The cemetery is located on land granted to Jehoiada Jeffery for his service in the War of 1812, and is the only surviving site associated with his life. Jeffery is the first known permanent white settler in north central Arkansas.

The cemetery was listed on the National Register of Historic Places in 1999.

== See also ==
- A.C. Jeffery Farmstead, built by Jehoaida's son Augustus
- National Register of Historic Places listings in Izard County, Arkansas
