= Calico Rock Home Economics Building =

- U.S. National Register of Historic Places
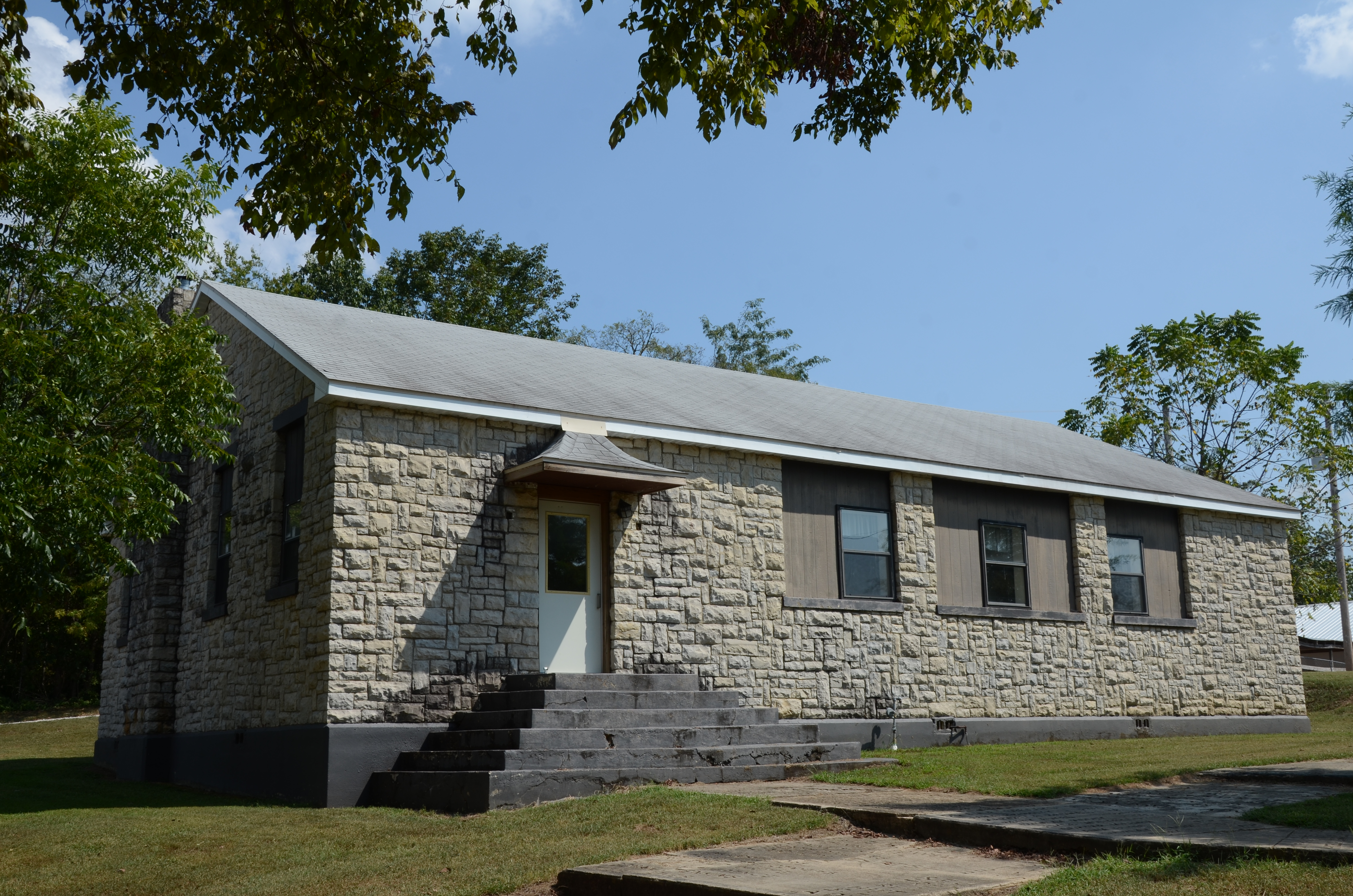

- Location within Arkansas Location within the United States
- Location: 2nd St., Calico Rock, Arkansas
- Coordinates: 36°7′1″N 92°8′2″W
- Area: less than one acre
- Built by: National Youth Administration
- Architectural style: Late 19th And Early 20th Century American Movements, Plain Traditional
- MPS: Public Schools in the Ozarks MPS
- NRHP reference No.: 92001200
- Added to NRHP: September 10, 1992

The Calico Rock Home Economics Building is a historic school building on 2nd Street in Calico Rock, Arkansas. It is a single-story stone structure with a gable roof and a concrete foundation. It was built in 1940 by crews funded by the National Youth Administration (NYA), who ranged in age from 15 to 18 and were paid 9 cents per hour. They hand-quarried stone at a site about 0.25 miles (0.40 km) away, and erected the building under the supervision of a local builder. The building includes four kitchen areas, a central work area, and restrooms. It is virtually unaltered from its original construction except for the replacement of windows.

The building was listed on the National Register of Historic Places in 1992.

== See also ==
- National Register of Historic Places listings in Izard County, Arkansas
