= Robert Emmett Jeffery =

American politician and diplomat

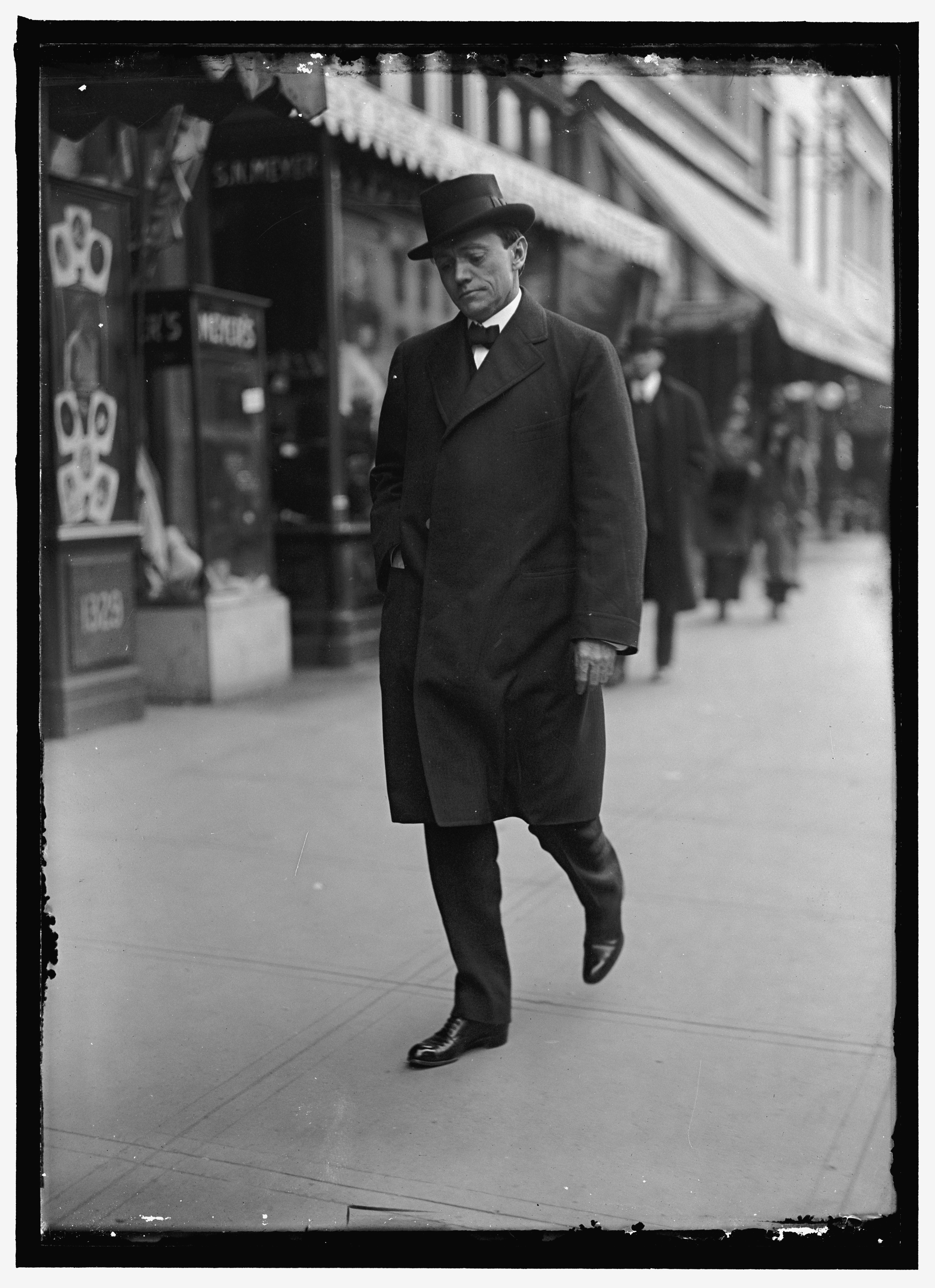
- Jeffery in 1915

United States Ambassador to Uruguay
- In office June 4, 1915 – March 9, 1921
- President: Woodrow Wilson
- Preceded by: Nicolai A. Grevstad
- Succeeded by: Hoffman Philip

Member of the Arkansas House of Representatives
- In office 1900–1902

Personal details
- Born: January 30, 1875 Mount Olive, Izard County, Arkansas, U.S.
- Died: May 19, 1935 (aged 60) Newport, Arkansas, U.S.
- Party: Democratic
- Children: 2

Robert Emmett Jeffery Jr. (January 30, 1875 – May 19, 1935) was an American lawyer, politician, and diplomat who served as the United States ambassador to Uruguay from 1915 to 1921.

== Early life and education ==
Jeffery was born in Mount Olive, Izard County, Arkansas, the oldest of 10 siblings and great-grandson of Jehoiada Jeffrey, the first permanent white settler in North Central Arkansas. He studied law and was admitted to the Arkansas Bar Association in 1925.

== Career ==
Jeffrey was elected to the Arkansas House of Representatives in 1900 and served until 1902. He also operated a legal practice in Newport, Arkansas. He was elected prosecuting attorney of the Arkansas Circuit Court for the third circuit in 1906 and became a judge of the same court in 1910. A childhood friend of Congressman William Allan Oldfield, Jeffery was recommended for a position in the Wilson administration. He was appointed to serve as ambassador to Uruguay in 1915 and remained in the position until 1921. After returning to Arkansas, Jeffery became an advocate for education in rural communities.

According to historian Mike Polston, Jeffrey's "defining accomplishments" during his six years of foreign service came during World War I:

Jeffrey was able to convince Uruguay's government to support the United States' war policy and worked to prevent the German navy from using Montevideo, one of the largest ports in South America. Finally, through his efforts, Uruguary broke off diplomatic relations with Germany in December 1917.
