= Jumbo Church of Christ =

Historic church in Arkansas, United States

- U.S. National Register of Historic Places
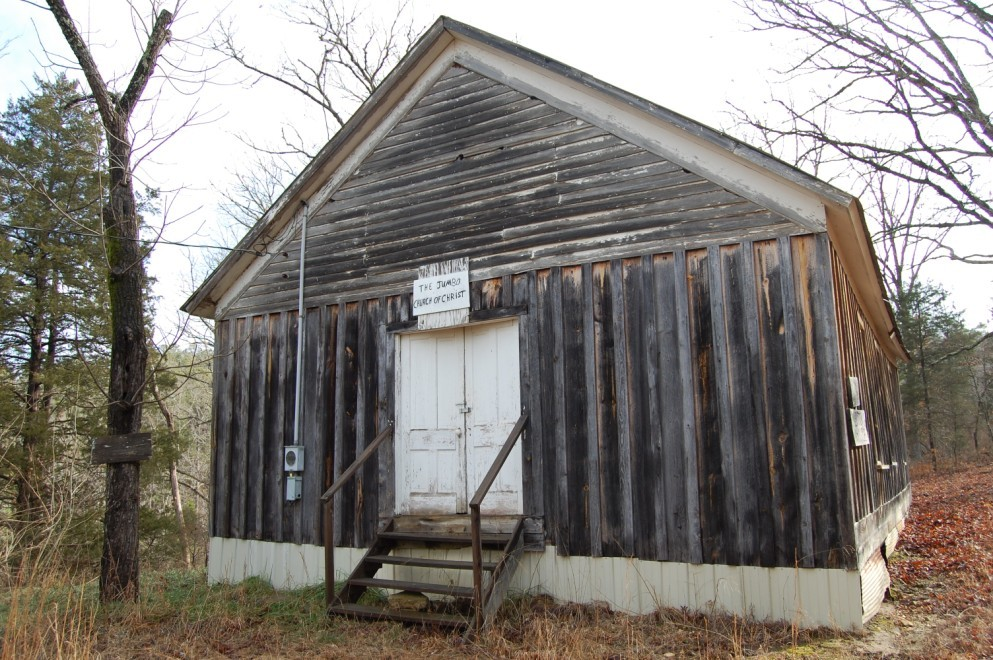

- Location within Arkansas Location within the United States
- Nearest city: Melbourne, Arkansas
- Coordinates: 36°3′34″N 91°58′39″W
- Area: less than one acre
- Built: 1927
- Architectural style: Plain traditional
- NRHP reference No.: 99000222
- Added to NRHP: February 18, 1999

The Jumbo Church of Christ is a historic church in rural Izard County, Arkansas, west of the city of Melbourne. It is located on the Jumbo Road (County Road 10), about 4 miles (6.4 km) west of its junction with Arkansas Highway 9. It is a vernacular Plain Traditional wood-frame structure, built on sandstone piers and topped with a gabled corrugated metal roof. The church was built c. 1927-28 by the citizens of the then-thriving community of Jumbo, and is one of its few surviving structures. The community's decline began after 1949, when its municipal services were consolidated with those of Melbourne, and people began moving to the larger community. The church was abandoned in 1984, but restored in 1997 by a group of former residents of the area.

The building was listed on the National Register of Historic Places in 1999.

== See also ==
- National Register of Historic Places listings in Izard County, Arkansas
