= Calico Rock Historic District =

Historic district in Arkansas, United States

- U.S. National Register of Historic Places
- U.S. Historic district
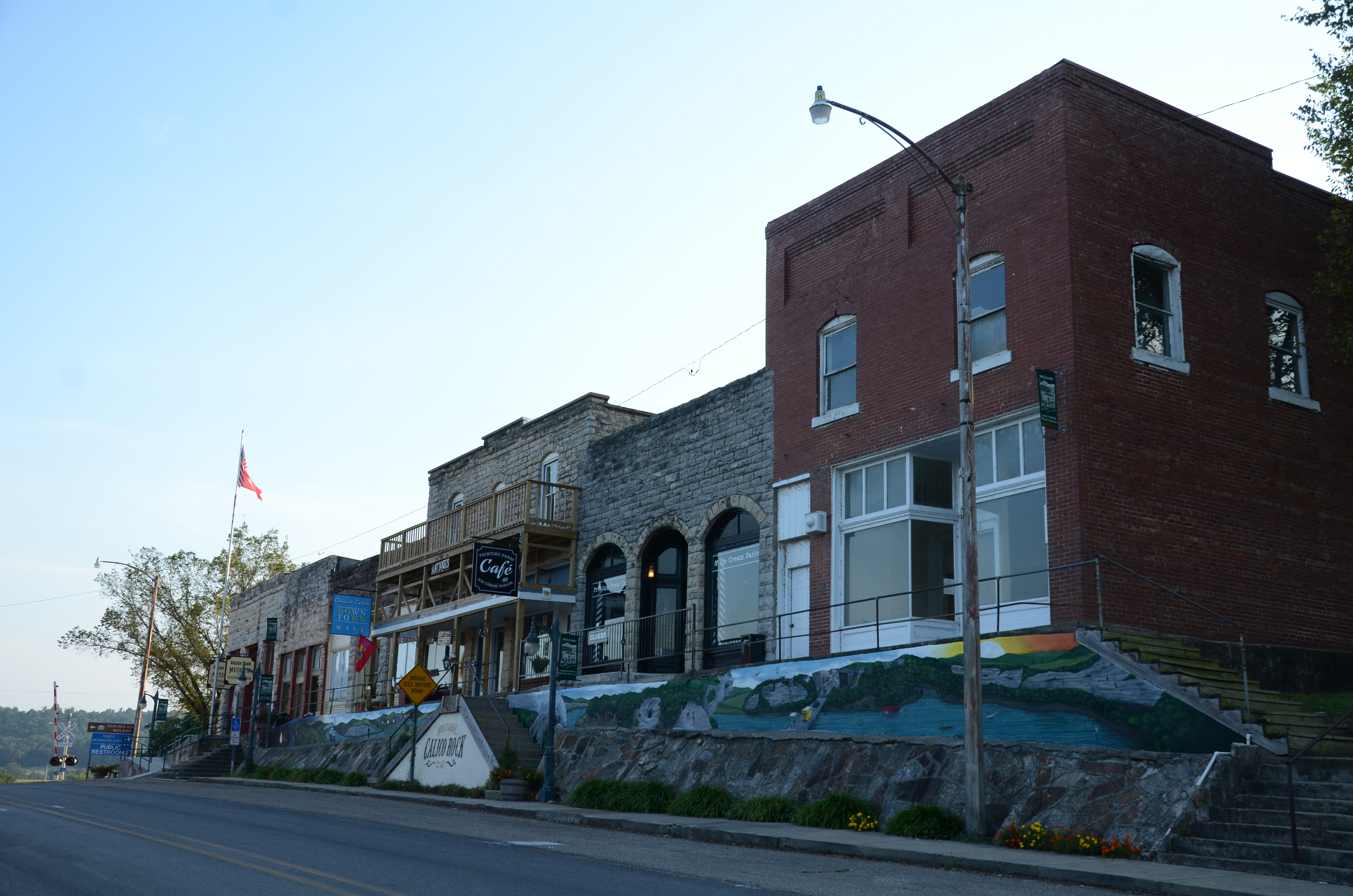

- Location within Arkansas Location within the United States
- Location: Roughly bounded by Main, Rodman, and Walnut Sts., and Peppersauce Alley, Calico Rock, Arkansas; also W side of Rodman St. at Missouri-Pacific Railroad tracks
- Area: 2.5 acres (1.0 ha)
- Architectural style: Italianate
- NRHP reference No.: 85003499 (original); 88002827 (increase)

Significant dates
- Added to NRHP: November 19, 1985
- Boundary increase: October 26, 1989

The Calico Rock Historic District encompasses the historic central portion of the business district of Calico Rock, Arkansas. The district includes a single block of Main Street (Arkansas Highway 5 between Rodman Street and Walnut Street, and includes properties on Rodman Street. This area's buildings date from between 1902 and 1930, and are all of brick and masonry construction. Although Calico Rock was settled by the 1820s and was the site of a 19th-century ferry crossing of the White River, its central business area suffered from fires and floods, and boomed economically with the arrival of the railroad in 1904.

The district was listed on the National Register of Historic Places in 1985, and enlarged in 1989 to include the River View Hotel on Rodman Street.

== See also ==
- National Register of Historic Places listings in Izard County, Arkansas
