= Rocky Harris =

Australian cricket umpire (1932–2013)

Personal information
- Born: 16 September 1932; New South Wales, Australia
- Died: 1 February 2013 (aged 80); St Leonards, New South Wales, Australia

Umpiring information
- ODIs umpired: 1 (1979)
- Source: Cricinfo, 18 May 2014

Ronald George Harris (16 September 1932 – 1 February 2013) was an Australian cricket umpire. At the international level, the only fixture that he officiated in was an ODI game in 1979.

== See also ==
- List of One Day International cricket umpires
