= Graham Matthews (cricketer) =

Australian cricketer (born 1953)

Personal information
- Born: 17 April 1953 (age 73); Melbourne, Australia

Domestic team information
- Years: Team
- 1976-1981: Victoria
- Source: Cricinfo, 5 December 2015

Graham Matthews (born 17 April 1953) is an Australian former cricketer. He played 21 first-class cricket matches for Victoria between 1976 and 1981.

== See also ==
- List of Victoria first-class cricketers
