= Sylvester Smith Farmstead =

Historic house in Arkansas, United States

- U.S. National Register of Historic Places
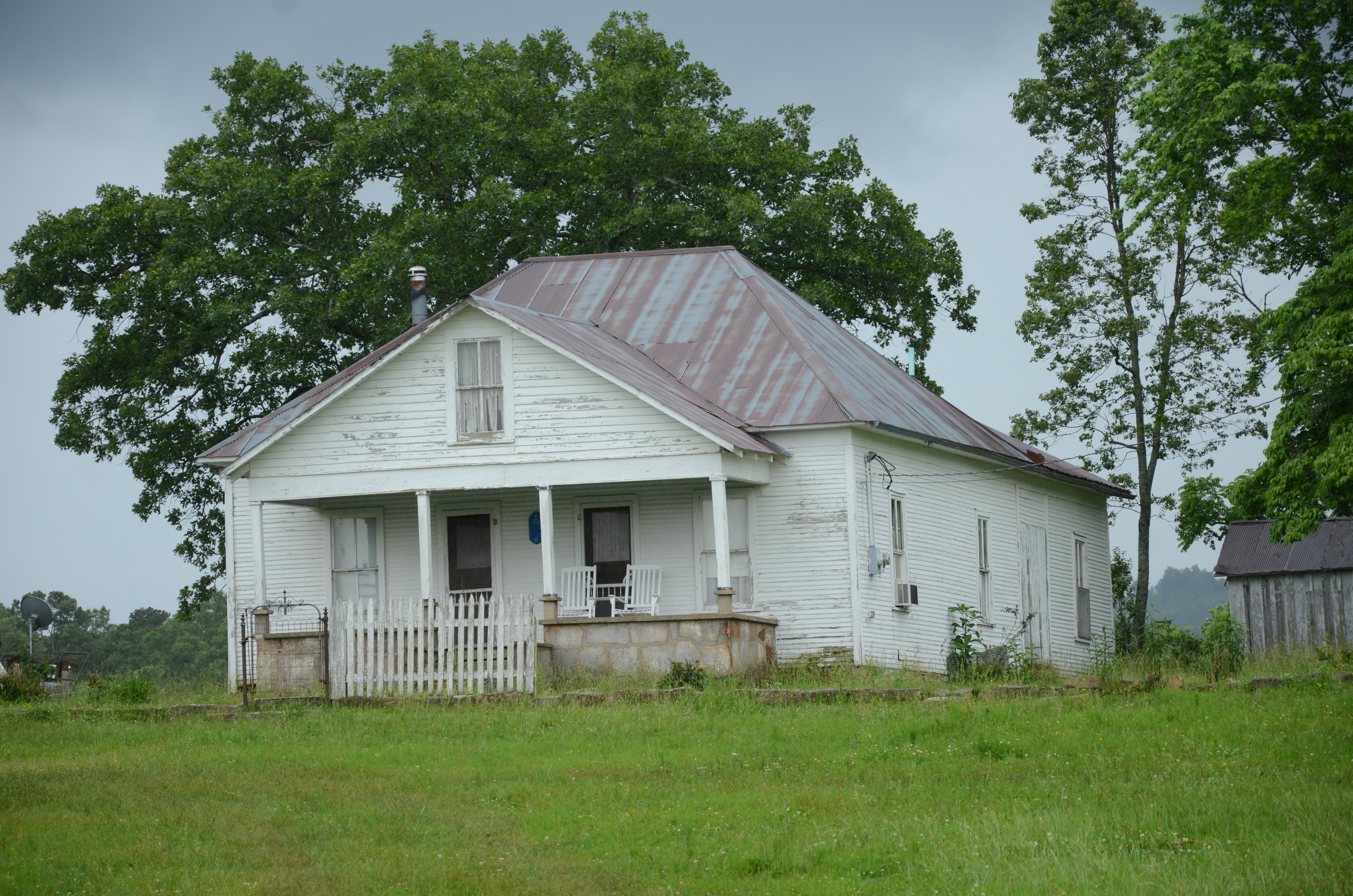

- Location within Arkansas Location within the United States
- Nearest city: Boswell, Arkansas
- Coordinates: 36°2′31″N 92°2′39″W
- Area: 5 acres (2.0 ha)
- Built: 1922
- Built by: Sylvester Smith
- Architectural style: Late 19th And Early 20th Century American Movements, Plain Traditional
- NRHP reference No.: 92001222
- Added to NRHP: September 8, 1992

The Sylvester Smith Farmstead is a historic farmstead in rural Izard County, Arkansas. It is located on the south side of County Road 10 (Jumbo Road), about 0.75 miles (1.21 km) northeast of its junction with County Road 13 in Boswell. The central feature of the farmstead is a single story Plain-Traditional wood-frame house, built in 1922 by Sylvester Smith, a prominent local farmer who also served as the local railroad telegrapher and agent. Smith built a barn, chicken house, smokehouse, and corn crib the following year, and the complex grew in later years to include a garage and privy. It is one of the best-preserved and least-altered farmsteads of the period in the county.

The property was listed on the National Register of Historic Places in 1992.

== See also ==
- National Register of Historic Places listings in Izard County, Arkansas
