= Sylvester Smith (American football) =

American football player (born 2005)

No. 19 – Auburn Tigers
- Position: Safety
- Class: Redshirt Junior

Personal information
- Born: November 4, 2005 (age 21)
- Listed height: 5 ft 11 in (1.80 m)
- Listed weight: 186 lb (84 kg)

Career information
- High school: Munford (Munford, Alabama)
- College: Auburn (2023–present)
- Stats at ESPN

Sylvester Smith (born November 4, 2005) is an American football safety for the Auburn Tigers.

== Early life ==
Smith played for Munford High School in Munford, Alabama. He was rated as the number 222 overall player in the class of 2023 by 247Sports, and the number 17 safety in the class.

== College career ==
Smith committed to Tennessee in April 2022. He decommitted from Tennessee and flipped his commitment to Auburn on December 18, 2022.

=== Auburn ===
Smith was placed on a redshirt in 2023 and competed for a starting role in 2024. He played as the starting safety during the later parts of the 2024 season. In his second game of the 2025 season, he recorded six tackles against the Ball State Cardinals. In the 2025 Iron Bowl, he missed the first half of the game after a targeting call the previous week against Mercer. He finished 2025 with 59 tackles, eight pass breakups, one interception, and one fumble recovery.

Smith confirmed he would return to the team in 2026 through a social media post on January 11, 2026.
