= Sylamore, Arkansas =

- Unincorporated community
- Location within Arkansas Location within the United States
- Coordinates: 35°56′29″N 92°06′30″W
- Country: United States
- State: Arkansas
- County: Izard
- Elevation: 338 ft (103 m)
- Time zone: UTC-6 (Central (CST))
  - Summer (DST): UTC-5 (CDT)
- Area code: 870
- GNIS feature ID: 73810

Sylamore is an unincorporated community in Izard County, Arkansas, United States. Sylamore is located on the White River and Arkansas Highway 9 in southern Izard County, 5.1 miles (8.2 km) north of Mountain View.
