= Stuart Saunders (cricketer) =

Australian cricketer (born 1960)

Personal information
- Full name: Stuart Lucas Saunders
- Born: 27 June 1960 (age 66); Hobart, Tasmania, Australia
- Batting: Right-handed
- Bowling: Right-arm leg-break

Domestic team information
- Years: Team
- 1979/80–1988/89: Tasmania

Career statistics
Competition	First-class	List A
Matches	60	6
Runs scored	2,114	99
Batting average	25.46	16.50
100s/50s	4/13	0/0
Top score	138*	43
Balls bowled	7,170	18
Wickets	70	1
Bowling average	57.37	25.00
5 wickets in innings	1	0
10 wickets in match	0	0
Best bowling	5/114	1/11
Catches/stumpings	32/–	4/–
- Source: Cricket Archive, 18 August 2010

Stuart Lucas Saunders (born 27 June 1960) was an Australian cricketer who played for Tasmania. He was a right-handed batsman and right-arm leg break bowler who played for the state side between 1979–80 and 1988–89. He was born at Hobart in 1960.
