= Ian Kelly (cricketer) =

Australian cricketer (born 1959)

Personal information
- Born: 5 May 1959 (age 67); Brisbane, Queensland, Australia
- Source: Cricinfo, 3 October 2020

Ian Kelly (born 5 May 1959) is an Australian cricketer who was a left-arm orthodox spin bowler. He played in four first-class matches for Queensland between 1980 and 1982.

Kelly played for Wynnum Manly in Brisbane Grade Cricket, and he was a member of the clubs 1982/83 Premiership side, and also its 1996/97 Premiership side. He debuted for Queensland in the 1980/81 Sheffield Shield season in Brisbane in late October, however he suffered a finger injury during the match which prevented him from bowling and he only played the one First-class game for the season. He played three matches for Queensland in the 1981/82 season but never took a First-class wicket.

== See also ==
- List of Queensland first-class cricketers
