= Robert Jeffery (cricketer) =

Australian cricketer (born 1953)

Personal information
- Full name: Robert Frederick Jeffery
- Born: 19 September 1953 (age 73); Goulburn, New South Wales, Australia
- Batting: Left-handed
- Bowling: Left-arm medium

Domestic team information
- Years: Team
- 1979/80–1981/82: Tasmania
- 1978/79: New South Wales

Career statistics
Competition	FC	LA
Matches	21	9
Runs scored	1,159	280
Batting average	32.19	31.11
100s/50s	2/3	0/2
Top score	198	61
Balls bowled	1,286	294
Wickets	16	8
Bowling average	46.43	32.62
5 wickets in innings	0	0
10 wickets in match	0	–
Best bowling	4/37	3/35
Catches/stumpings	7/–	3/–
- Source: Cricinfo, 4 January 2011

Robert Frederick Jeffery (born 19 September 1953) is a former Australian cricketer. An all-rounder who batted left-handed and bowled left-arm medium pace, he played first-class cricket for New South Wales and Tasmania from 1978 until 1982.

Jeffery's highest first-class score was 198 for Tasmania against Queensland in 1979–80, when he put on 182 for the opening stand with Gary Goodman, and 142 for the third wicket with Brian Davison. His best first-class bowling figures were 4 for 37 against Western Australia a few weeks later.
