= Mount Olive, Izard County, Arkansas =

Mount Olive, Arkansas
- Census-designated place
- Location within Arkansas Location within the United States
- Coordinates: 36°00′02″N 92°05′35″W
- Country: United States
- State: Arkansas
- County: Izard
- Elevation: 371 ft (113 m)

Population (2020)
  - Total: 17
- Time zone: UTC-6 (Central (CST))
  - Summer (DST): UTC-5 (CDT)
- Area code: 870
- GNIS feature ID: 2805666

Mount Olive is an unincorporated community and census-designated place (CDP) in Izard County, Arkansas, United States. Mount Olive is located on the White River, 11.1 miles (17.9 km) west-southwest of Melbourne.

It was first listed as a CDP in the 2020 census with a population of 17.

== Demographics ==
Historical population
Census	Pop.	Note	%±
2020	17		—
U.S. Decennial Census; 2020

=== 2020 census ===
Mount Olive CDP, Arkansas – Demographic Profile (NH = Non-Hispanic)
Race / Ethnicity	Pop 2020	% 2020
White alone (NH)	16	94.12%
Black or African American alone (NH)	0	0.00%
Native American or Alaska Native alone (NH)	0	0.00%
Asian alone (NH)	0	0.00%
Pacific Islander alone (NH)	0	0.00%
Some Other Race alone (NH)	0	0.00%
Mixed Race/Multi-Racial (NH)	1	5.88%
Hispanic or Latino (any race)	0	0.00%
Total	17	100.00%

Note: the US Census treats Hispanic/Latino as an ethnic category. This table excludes Latinos from the racial categories and assigns them to a separate category. Hispanics/Latinos can be of any race.
